= List of RPM number-one country singles of 1981 =

These are the Canadian number-one country songs of 1981, per the RPM Country Tracks chart.

Issue date	Title	Artist
February 21	9 to 5	Dolly Parton
February 28	Southern Rains	Mel Tillis
March 7	Southern Rains	Mel Tillis
March 14	Southern Rains	Mel Tillis
March 21	Angel Flying Too Close to the Ground	Willie Nelson
March 28	Angel Flying Too Close to the Ground	Willie Nelson
April 4	Guitar Man	Elvis Presley
April 11	Crying	Don McLean
April 18	Crying	Don McLean
April 25	Old Flame	Alabama
May 2	A Headache Tomorrow (Or a Heartache Tonight)	Mickey Gilley
May 9	A Headache Tomorrow (Or a Heartache Tonight)	Mickey Gilley
May 16	Mr. Sandman	Emmylou Harris
May 23	Mr. Sandman	Emmylou Harris
May 30	Am I Losing You	Ronnie Milsap
June 6	Pride	Janie Fricke
June 13	Pride	Janie Fricke
June 20	Elvira	The Oak Ridge Boys
June 27	Blessed Are the Believers	Anne Murray
July 4	Blessed Are the Believers	Anne Murray
August 29	Too Many Lovers	Crystal Gayle
September 5	I Don't Need You	Kenny Rogers
September 12	(There's) No Gettin' Over Me	Ronnie Milsap
September 19	Some Days Are Diamonds (Some Days Are Stone)	John Denver
September 26	You Don't Know Me	Mickey Gilley
October 3	You Don't Know Me	Mickey Gilley
October 10	Midnight Hauler	Razzy Bailey
October 17	Older Women	Ronnie McDowell
October 24	Step By Step	Eddie Rabbitt
October 31	Never Been So Loved (In All My Life)	Charley Pride
November 7	Never Been So Loved (In All My Life)	Charley Pride
November 14	I'll Need Someone to Hold Me (When I Cry)	Janie Fricke
November 21	All My Rowdy Friends (Have Settled Down)	Hank Williams, Jr.
November 28	It's All I Can Do	Anne Murray
December 5	It's All I Can Do	Anne Murray
December 12	If I Needed You	Emmylou Harris and Don Williams
December 19	If I Needed You	Emmylou Harris and Don Williams
December 26	I Never Figured on This	David Thompson

== See also ==
- 1981 in music
- List of number-one country hits of 1981 (U.S.)
