= 1981 in country music =

This is a list of notable events in country music that took place in the year 1981.

== Events ==
- March 14 — The final showing of Live From The Grand Ole Opry on the Public Broadcasting System (PBS) occurs on this night. The show actually went beyond the televised segment, but the show was ended with a clip of Marty Robbins singing "El Paso" (a song he used to close out his Opry segment at midnight) from the year before. Because of cost over-runs and other technicalities, this was the final run for the annual show on PBS that featured the music of Tom T. Hall, Del Reeves, Hank Snow, Roy Acuff and Minnie Pearl, and many other performers.
- October — The Weekly Country Music Countdown, a three-hour weekly countdown program distributed by the United Stations Radio Network, debuts. The syndicated program, hosted by radio personality Chris Charles and produced by Ed Salamon, features the top 30 country hits of the week as reported by Radio & Records magazine. The program is a success and the first country music-oriented countdown program to successfully rival the 8-year-old American Country Countdown show. At year's end, United Stations announces a series of specials, to be called "Country Six Pack," will begin airing in 1982; those three-hour special programs, including an annual Christmas program, are scheduled to air during each of the major holidays.

=== No dates ===
- The Smithsonian Collection of Classic Country Music, an eight-volume, 143-track collection, is released. The box set is considered one of the first important retrospectives of the genre and contains extensive liner notes, depicting the importance of each song or artist included. Songs included range from 1922's "Sally Gooden" to 1975's "Blue Eyes Crying in the Rain" by Willie Nelson. Specifically, each volume is titled as follows: "1920's," "1930's Southeast," "1930's Southwest," "1941–1953" (two records), "1953–1963," "Bluegrass" and "1963–1975."
  - Also during the year, the Franklin Mint, as part of its volume series of significant musical recordings, begins issuing a series of country music-focused two-record sets. "The Greatest Country Music Recordings of All Time" will eventually spawn 50 different album sets through 1986 (each new volume issued roughly every other month), with each two-album set focusing on a different era, performer or style, topic and so forth, and each volume will have extensive liner notes and vintage photographs.

== Top hits of the year ==
=== Singles released by American artists ===
US	CAN	Single	Artist
7	4	1959	John Anderson
16	—	Acapulco	Johnny Duncan
20	41	Alice Doesn't Love Here Anymore	Bobby Goldsboro
1	1	All My Rowdy Friends (Have Settled Down)	Hank Williams, Jr.
1	19	All Roads Lead to You	Steve Wariner
1	1	Am I Losing You	Ronnie Milsap
1	1	Angel Flying Too Close to the Ground	Willie Nelson
10	10	Any Which Way You Can	Glen Campbell
1	—	Are You Happy Baby?	Dottie West
10	6	The Baron	Johnny Cash
3	27	Beautiful You	The Oak Ridge Boys
1	5	Bet Your Heart on Me	Johnny Lee
17	8	Between This Time and the Next Time	Gene Watson
3	6	A Bridge That Just Won't Burn	Conway Twitty
1	2	But You Know I Love You	Dolly Parton
6	50	By Now	Steve Wariner
4	4	Can I See You Tonight	Tanya Tucker
44	20	Carolina (I Remember You)	Charlie Daniels
16	—	Cheatin's a Two Way Street	Sammi Smith
8	—	Chicken Truck	John Anderson
6	1	Crying	Don McLean
18	11	Crying in the Rain	Tammy Wynette
12	—	Cup of Tea	Rex Allen, Jr. and Margo Smith
19	—	Darlin'	Tom Jones
1	41	Dixie on My Mind	Hank Williams, Jr.
18	29	Do I Have to Draw a Picture	Billy Swan
1	4	Do You Love as Good as You Look	The Bellamy Brothers
20	—	Does She Wish She Was Single Again	The Burrito Brothers
13	48	Don't Bother to Knock	Jim Ed Brown and Helen Cornelius
13	—	Don't Forget Yourself	The Statler Brothers
16	47	Don't Get Above Your Raisin'	Ricky Skaggs
11	—	Don't Look Now (But We Just Fell in Love)	Eddy Arnold
5	36	Don't Wait on Me	The Statler Brothers
11	18	Don't You Ever Get Tired (Of Hurting Me)	Willie Nelson & Ray Price
16	14	Down and Out	George Strait
2	2	Down to My Last Broken Heart	Janie Fricke
7	—	Dream of Me	Vern Gosdin
1	13	Drifter	Sylvia
1	1	Elvira	The Oak Ridge Boys
6	3	Falling Again	Don Williams
16	—	Feedin' the Fire	Zella Lehr
1	5	Feels So Right	Alabama
1	—	Fire and Smoke	Earl Thomas Conley
10	—	Following the Feeling	Moe Bandy & Judy Bailey
6	—	Fool by Your Side	Dave & Sugar
1	9	Friends	Razzy Bailey
14	—	Girls, Women and Ladies	Ed Bruce
5	—	Giving Up Easy	Leon Everette
13	—	Good Ol' Girls	Sonny Curtis
25	9	Good Times	Willie Nelson
17	—	Goodbye Marie	Bobby Goldsboro
9	17	Grandma's Song	Gail Davies
1	1	Guitar Man	Elvis Presley
1	1	A Headache Tomorrow (Or a Heartache Tonight)	Mickey Gilley
8	22	Headed for a Heartache	Gary Morris
8	11	Heart on the Mend	Sylvia
10	8	Hey Joe (Hey Moe)	Moe Bandy and Joe Stampley
8	10	Hillbilly Girl with the Blues	Lacy J. Dalton
12	11	Honky Tonk Queen	Moe Bandy and Joe Stampley
2	30	Hooked on Music	Mac Davis
14	20	The House of the Rising Sun	Dolly Parton
4	3	Hurricane	Leon Everette
16	38	Husbands and Wives	David Frizzell and Shelly West
1	1	I Don't Need You	Kenny Rogers
13	—	I Don't Think Love Ought to Be That Way	Reba McEntire
1	3	I Feel Like Loving You Again	T. G. Sheppard
17	—	I Have a Dream	Cristy Lane
11	20	I Just Need You for Tonight	Billy Crash Craddock
1	3	I Keep Coming Back	Razzy Bailey
1	4	I Love a Rainy Night	Eddie Rabbitt
15	39	I Love My Truck	Glen Campbell
54	11	I Love You a Thousand Ways	John Anderson
1	3	I Loved 'Em Every One	T. G. Sheppard
13	—	I Should've Called	Eddy Raven
2	3	I Still Believe in Waltzes	Conway Twitty & Loretta Lynn
1	29	I Think I'll Just Stay Here and Drink	Merle Haggard
1	14	I Was Country When Country Wasn't Cool	Barbara Mandrell
4	8	I'll Be There (If You Ever Want Me)	Gail Davies
4	1	I'll Need Someone to Hold Me (When I Cry)	Janie Fricke
9	—	I'm Gonna Love You Back to Lovin' Me Again	Joe Stampley
16	22	(I'm Gonna) Put You Back on the Rack	Dottie West
18	28	I'm Into Lovin' You	Billy Swan
4	2	I'm Just an Old Chunk of Coal (But I'm Gonna Be a Diamond Someday)	John Anderson
1	2	(I'm Settin') Fancy Free	The Oak Ridge Boys
8	25	If Drinkin' Don't Kill Me (Her Memory Will)	George Jones
11	16	If I Keep on Going Crazy	Leon Everette
3	1	If I Needed You	Emmylou Harris and Don Williams
12	—	If You Go, I'll Follow You	Porter Wagoner and Dolly Parton
6	—	It Don't Hurt Me Half as Bad	Ray Price
5	11	It's a Lovely, Lovely World	Gail Davies
4	7	It's Now or Never	John Schneider
16	—	Just Like Me	Terry Gregory
17	—	Just One Time	Tompall & the Glaser Brothers
10	39	Killin' Time	Fred Knoblock and Susan Anton
9	7	Leonard	Merle Haggard
7	21	Louisiana Saturday Night	Mel McDaniel
19	33	Love Ain't Never Hurt Nobody	Bobby Goldsboro
13	—	Love Dies Hard	Randy Barlow
1	1	Love in the First Degree	Alabama
13	7	Love Is Fair	Barbara Mandrell
8	10	Lovin' Arms	Elvis Presley
2	2	Lovin' Her Was Easier (Than Anything I'll Ever Do Again)	Tompall & the Glaser Brothers
7	5	Lovin' What Your Lovin' Does to Me	Loretta Lynn and Conway Twitty
7	8	The Matador	Sylvia
23	12	Maybe I Should Have Been Listening	Gene Watson
10	12	Memphis	Fred Knoblock
1	1	Midnight Hauler	Razzy Bailey
8	10	A Million Old Goodbyes	Mel Tillis
4	2	Miracles	Don Williams
2	7	Miss Emily's Picture	John Conlee
11	7	Mona Lisa	Willie Nelson
10	1	Mr. Sandman	Emmylou Harris
1	4	My Baby Thinks He's a Train	Rosanne Cash
1	3	My Favorite Memory	Merle Haggard
15	25	My Woman Loves the Devil Out of Me	Moe Bandy
1	1	Never Been So Loved (In All My Life)	Charley Pride
1	1	9 to 5	Dolly Parton
1	1	Old Flame	Alabama
1	1	Older Women	Ronnie McDowell
10	—	One-Night Fever	Mel Tillis
1	2	Party Time	T. G. Sheppard
23	20	Perfect Fool	Debby Boone
3	4	Pickin' Up Strangers	Johnny Lee
12	1	Pride	Janie Fricke
3	4	Prisoner of Hope	Johnny Lee
14	6	Queen of Hearts	Juice Newton
4	17	Rainbow Stew	Merle Haggard
43	19	Ready for the Times to Get Better	Joe Sun
1	9	Rest Your Love on Me	Conway Twitty
19	29	Rich Man	Terri Gibbs
10	17	Right in the Palm of Your Hand	Mel McDaniel
7	2	Roll On Mississippi	Charley Pride
8	—	Scratch My Back (And Whisper in My Ear)	Razzy Bailey
1	6	Seven Year Ache	Rosanne Cash
5	2	Share Your Love with Me	Kenny Rogers
16	—	She Belongs to Everyone but Me	The Burrito Brothers
17	—	She's Steppin' Out	Con Hunley
50	16	Should I Do It	Tanya Tucker
7	—	Silent Treatment	Earl Thomas Conley
4	2	Sleepin' with the Radio On	Charly McClain
10	1	Some Days Are Diamonds (Some Days Are Stone)	John Denver
20	38	Somebody Led Me Away	Loretta Lynn
8	2	Somebody's Knockin'	Terri Gibbs
13	—	Somethin' on the Radio	Jacky Ward
1	1	Southern Rains	Mel Tillis
1	1	Step by Step	Eddie Rabbitt
1	2	Still Doin' Time	George Jones
17	11	Storms Never Last	Jessi Colter and Waylon Jennings
5	13	Surround Me with Love	Charly McClain
17	3	Take It Easy	Crystal Gayle
2	2	Takin' It Easy	Lacy J. Dalton
7	42	Teach Me to Cheat	The Kendalls
9	—	A Texas State of Mind	David Frizzell and Shelly West
1	22	Texas Women	Hank Williams, Jr.
13	12	Them Good Old Boys Are Bad	John Schneider
1	1	(There's) No Gettin' Over Me	Ronnie Milsap
12	—	They Could Put Me in Jail	The Bellamy Brothers
4	6	Thirty-Nine and Holdin'	Jerry Lee Lewis
1	8	Tight Fittin' Jeans	Conway Twitty
5	8	Today All Over Again	Reba McEntire
1	1	Too Many Lovers	Crystal Gayle
6	—	Unwound	George Strait
2	27	Wandering Eyes	Ronnie McDowell
1	3	What Are We Doin' in Love	Dottie West
4	28	What Are We Doin' Lonesome	Larry Gatlin & the Gatlin Brothers
12	15	What I Had with You	John Conlee
11	—	What's New with You	Con Hunley
14	12	(When You Fall in Love) Everything's a Waltz	Ed Bruce
18	21	Whiskey Chasin'	Joe Stampley
10	12	Whisper	Lacy J. Dalton
1	2	Who's Cheatin' Who	Charly McClain
10	6	The Wild Side of Life/ It Wasn't God Who Made Honky Tonk Angels	Jessi Colter and Waylon Jennings
19	15	Willie Jones	Bobby Bare
20	—	Wind Is Bound to Change	Larry Gatlin and the Gatlin Brothers
2	11	Wish You Were Here	Barbara Mandrell
3	2	The Woman in Me	Crystal Gayle
18	25	You Better Move On	George Jones and Johnny Paycheck
1	1	You Don't Know Me	Mickey Gilley
20	—	You (Make Me Wonder Why)	Deborah Allen
9	16	You May See Me Walkin'	Ricky Skaggs
7	16	You're My Favorite Star	The Bellamy Brothers
14	—	You're the Best	Kieran Kane
1	13	You're the Reason God Made Oklahoma	David Frizzell and Shelly West
13	—	Your Good Girl's Gonna Go Bad	Billie Jo Spears
7	—	Your Memory	Steve Wariner

=== Singles released by Canadian artists ===
US	CAN	Single	Artist
—	10	Another Broken Hearted Melody	Family Brown
1	1	Blessed Are the Believers	Anne Murray
—	15	Breaking and Entering	Carroll Baker
—	11	Crazy Heart	Laura Vinson
—	19	Every Story in the Book	Ronnie Prophet
—	14	Four High Cards	Peter Chipman
—	8	High and Dry	C-Weed Band
—	14	Honky Tonk Fever	Harold MacIntyre
—	18	How Deep in Love Am I	Eddie Eastman
—	1	I Never Figured on This	David Thompson
—	15	I'm Leanin' on the Devil Tonight	John Winters
9	1	It's All I Can Do	Anne Murray
57	7	It's Really Love This Time	Family Brown
—	16	Joanne	Lee Marlow
—	5	King of Fools	Wayne Rostad
—	10	Lovin' Thru the Early Hours	Lee Marlow
82	12	Mama What Does Cheatin' Mean	Carroll Baker
—	19	The Moondancer	Ian Tyson
—	3	Nashville Just Wrote (Another Cheatin' Song)	Midnite Rodeo Band
—	9	Not Living, Not Dying	Jerry Palmer
—	17	Ode to an Outlaw's Lady	Terry Carisse
—	18	Ribbon of Gold	Family Brown
—	19	Satisfied Mind	Bill Hersh
—	8	Shoppin' Bag Lady	Gurney Anderson
—	8	(Stuck In) Lodi	Ronnie Hawkins
—	20	Sweet Harmony	Mercey Brothers
—	12	The Time It Takes to Leave	Canadian Zephyr
84	14	Too Much, Too Little, Too Late	Mary Bailey
45	9	Wasn't That a Party	The Rovers
—	16	Watching It Die	Canadian Zephyr
16	5	We Don't Have to Hold Out	Anne Murray
—	15	Where the Water Meets the Sky	Coyote
—	7	Windship	Terry Carisse
—	8	Wonderin' If Willy	Marie Bottrell

== Top new album releases ==
US	Album	Artist	Record label
4	Barbara Mandrell Live	Barbara Mandrell	MCA
24	The Baron	Johnny Cash	Columbia
9	Bet Your Heart on Me	Johnny Lee	Full Moon
3	Big City	Merle Haggard	Epic
6	Carryin' on the Family Names	David Frizzell & Shelly West	Warner Bros./Viva
10	Christmas	Kenny Rogers	Liberty
6	Cimarron	Emmylou Harris	Warner Bros.
19	Darlin'	Tom Jones	Mercury
10	Drifter	Sylvia	RCA
5	Especially for You	Don Williams	MCA
5	Evangeline	Emmylou Harris	Warner Bros.
1	Fancy Free	The Oak Ridge Boys	MCA
1	Feels So Right	Alabama	RCA
19	Fire & Smoke	Earl Thomas Conley	RCA
6	Good Time Lovin' Man	Ronnie McDowell	Epic
8	Greatest Hits	Charley Pride	RCA
8	Greatest Hits	Jim Reeves & Patsy Cline	RCA
1	Greatest Hits (& Some That Will Be)	Willie Nelson	Columbia
6	Guitar Man	Elvis Presley	RCA
23	Hey Joe! Hey Moe!	Moe Bandy & Joe Stampley	Columbia
5	Hollywood, Tennessee	Crystal Gayle	Columbia
7	I Love 'Em All	T. G. Sheppard	Warner Bros./Curb
24	I'm Countryfied	Mel McDaniel	Capitol
25	John Anderson 2	John Anderson	Warner Bros.
4	Juice	Juice Newton	Capitol
11	Leather and Lace	Waylon Jennings & Jessi Colter	RCA
8	Makin' Friends	Razzy Bailey	RCA
20	Me and My R.C.	Louise Mandrell & R. C. Bannon	RCA
19	Midnight Crazy	Mac Davis	Casablanca
5	Mr. T	Conway Twitty	MCA
10	Not Guilty	Larry Gatlin and the Gatlin Brothers	Columbia
8	Now or Never	John Schneider	Scotti Brothers
6	Out Where the Bright Lights Are Glowing	Ronnie Milsap	RCA
5	The Pressure Is On	Hank Williams, Jr.	Elektra/Curb
20	Rainbow Stew: Live at Anaheim Stadium	Merle Haggard	MCA
17	Roll On Mississippi	Charley Pride	RCA
2	Rowdy	Hank Williams Jr.	Elektra/Curb
1	Seven Year Ache	Rosanne Cash	Columbia
1	Share Your Love	Kenny Rogers	Liberty
7	Some Days Are Diamonds	John Denver	RCA
6	Somebody's Knockin'	Terri Gibbs	MCA
1	Somewhere Over the Rainbow	Willie Nelson	Columbia
1	Step by Step	Eddie Rabbitt	Elektra
3	Still the Same Ole Me	George Jones	Epic
9	Surround Me with Love	Charly McClain	Epic
12	Takin' It Easy	Lacy J. Dalton	Columbia
1	There's No Gettin' Over Me	Ronnie Milsap	RCA
17	Town & Country	Ray Price	Dimension
23	Urban Chipmunk	The Chipmunks	RCA
2	Waitin' for the Sun to Shine	Ricky Skaggs	Epic
4	Where Do You Go When You Dream	Anne Murray	Capitol
22	With Love	John Conlee	MCA
5	Wild West	Dottie West	Liberty
9	Years Ago	The Statler Brothers	Mercury
19	You Don't Know Me	Mickey Gilley	Epic

=== Other top albums ===
US	Album	Artist	Record label
43	As Is	Bobby Bare	Columbia
59	Ask Any Woman	Con Hunley	Warner Bros.
49	The Best of Jerry Lee Lewis	Jerry Lee Lewis	Elektra
38	Between This Time and the Next Time	Gene Watson	MCA
54	Bobby Goldsboro	Bobby Goldsboro	Curb
41	Christmas Country	Various Artists	Elektra
34	Christmas at Gilley's	Mickey Gilley	Epic
34	Christmas Wishes	Anne Murray	Capitol
52	Concrete Cowboys	The Concrete Cowboys Band	Excelsoir
45	Dakota	Stephanie Winslow	Warner Bros./Curb
26	Desperate Dreams	Eddy Raven	Elektra
47	Elvis-Greatest Hits, Volume One	Elvis Presley	RCA
43	Encore	George Jones	Epic
52	Encore	Charly McClain	Epic
44	Encore	Tammy Wynette	Epic
43	Fragile – Handle with Care	Cristy Lane	Liberty
47	Greatest Hits	Jim Ed Brown & Helen Cornelius	RCA
35	Greatest Hits	Dave & Sugar	RCA
42	Heart to Heart	Reba McEntire	Mercury
43	High Time	Dottie West	Liberty
30	Hurricane	Leon Everette	RCA
28	I Ain't Honky Tonkin' No More	Joe Sun	Elektra
35	I Have a Dream	Cristy Lane	Liberty
40	I Just Came Home to Count the Memories	John Anderson	Warner Bros.
33	I Lie	Loretta Lynn	MCA
40	I'm a Lady	Terri Gibbs	MCA
33	I'm Gonna Love You Back to Loving Me Again	Joe Stampley	Epic
56	If I Keep On Going Crazy	Leon Everette	RCA
67	Invictus (Means) Unconquered	David Allan Coe	Columbia
49	It's the World Gone Crazy	Glen Campbell	Capitol
52	Just Like Me	Terry Gregory	Handshake
54	King of the Road	Boxcar Willie	Main Street
42	Lettin' You In on a Feelin'	The Kendalls	Mercury
30	Live!	Hoyt Axton	Jeremiah
36	Lovin' Her Was Easier	Tompall & the Glaser Brothers	Elektra
56	Mel & Nancy	Mel Tillis & Nancy Sinatra	Elektra
39	Minstrel Man	Willie Nelson	RCA
43	More Good 'Uns	Jerry Clower	MCA
40	Mr. Hag Told My Story	Johnny Paycheck	Columbia
42	Mundo Earwood	Mundo Earwood	Excelsoir
64	My Turn	Donna Hazard	Excelsoir
33	The Night the Lights Went Out in Georgia (Soundtrack)	Various Artists	Mirage
57	Old Loves Never Die	Gene Watson	MCA
50	Once You Were Mine	Dottie West	RCA
29	One to One	Ed Bruce	MCA
31	Pleasure	Dave Rowland & Sugar	Elektra
48	Rodeo Romeo	Moe Bandy	Columbia
47	Rodney Crowell	Rodney Crowell	Warner Bros.
49	Savin' It Up	Debby Boone	Warner Bros./Curb
48	Should I Do It	Tanya Tucker	MCA
42	Sleeping with Your Memory	Janie Fricke	Columbia
46	Songs for the Mama That Tried	Merle Haggard	MCA
26	Strait Country	George Strait	MCA
33	Take This Job and Shove It! (Soundtrack)	Various Artists	Epic
59	A Tribute to Kris	Ray Price	Columbia
28	Two's a Party	Conway Twitty & Loretta Lynn	MCA
30	Urban Cowboy II (Soundtrack)	Various Artists	Full Moon
38	Wasn't That a Party	The Rovers	Cleveland Int'l.
39	White Christmas	John Schneider	Scotti Brothers
40	A Woman's Heart	Crystal Gayle	Liberty

== On television ==
=== Regular series ===
- Barbara Mandrell and the Mandrell Sisters (1980–1982, NBC)
- Hee Haw (1969–1993, syndicated)
- Pop! Goes the Country (1974–1982, syndicated)
- The Porter Wagoner Show (1960–1981, syndicated)
- That Nashville Music (1970–1985, syndicated)

=== Specials ===
- June — Country Top 20 – Host Dennis Weaver presented the top 20 songs from January–June 1981. Performances from Alabama, The Gatlin Brothers, The Oak Ridge Boys, John Schneider, T. G. Sheppard, Dottie West and Shelly West. (syndicated)
- October — Country Galaxy of Stars – A two-hour special featuring performances by country music's top stars. (syndicated)
- December — Country Top 20 – A review of the top 20 songs from July–December 1981, with hosts Charly McClain and Roger Miller. Performers included John Conlee, Gail Davies, Crystal Gayle, Johnny Lee, Eddie Rabbitt, Eddy Raven, Joe Stampley, Sylvia and Hank Williams, Jr. (syndicated)

== Births ==
- March 23 — Brett Young, country pop singer. Best known for his string of hits in the mid-to-late 2010s.
- August 28 — Jake Owen, singer-songwriter of the 2000s.
- September 4 — Tom Gossin, member of Gloriana.
- September 11 — Charles Kelley, member of Lady Antebellum.
- December 4 — Lila McCann, teenage singer of the 1990s.

== Deaths ==
- January 31 – Scotty (born Scott Greene Wiseman), 72, one-half of the 1930s–1940s husband-and-wife duo Lulu Belle and Scotty.
- November 24 – Mother of Country Legends Loretta Lynn and Crystal Gayle dies at a Nashville hospital aged 69.

== Country Music Hall of Fame Inductees ==
- Vernon Dalhart (1883–1948)
- Grant Turner (1912–1991)

== Major awards ==
=== Grammy Awards ===
- Best Female Country Vocal Performance — "9 to 5", Dolly Parton
- Best Male Country Vocal Performance — "(There's) No Gettin' Over Me", Ronnie Milsap
- Best Country Performance by a Duo or Group with Vocal — "Elvira", The Oak Ridge Boys
- Best Country Instrumental Performance — "Country After All These Years", Chet Atkins
- Best Country Song — "9 to 5", Dolly Parton (Performer: Dolly Parton)

=== Juno Awards ===
- Country Male Vocalist of the Year — Eddie Eastman
- Country Female Vocalist of the Year — Anne Murray
- Country Group or Duo of the Year — The Good Brothers

=== Academy of Country Music ===
- Entertainer of the Year — Alabama
- Song of the Year — "You're the Reason God Made Oklahoma", Felice Bryant, Boudleaux Bryant, Larry Collins, Sandy Pinkard (Performer: David Frizzell and Shelly West)
- Single of the Year — "Elvira", The Oak Ridge Boys
- Album of the Year — Feels So Right, Alabama
- Top Male Vocalist — Merle Haggard
- Top Female Vocalist — Barbara Mandrell
- Top Vocal Duo — David Frizzell and Shelly West
- Top New Male Vocalist — Ricky Skaggs
- Top New Female Vocalist — Juice Newton

=== Country Music Association ===
- Entertainer of the Year — Barbara Mandrell
- Song of the Year — "He Stopped Loving Her Today", Bobby Braddock and Curly Putman (Performer: George Jones)
- Single of the Year — "Elvira", The Oak Ridge Boys
- Album of the Year — I Believe in You, Don Williams
- Male Vocalist of the Year — George Jones
- Female Vocalist of the Year — Barbara Mandrell
- Vocal Duo of the Year — David Frizzell and Shelly West
- Vocal Group of the Year — Alabama
- Horizon Award — Terri Gibbs
- Instrumentalist of the Year — Chet Atkins
- Instrumental Group of the Year — Alabama

== Other links ==
- Country Music Association
- Inductees of the Country Music Hall of Fame
