= 1981 in music =

This is a list of notable events in music that took place in 1981.

== Specific locations ==
- 1981 in British music
- 1981 in Japanese music
- 1981 in Norwegian music
- 1981 in Scandinavian music

== Specific genres ==
- 1981 in country music
- 1981 in heavy metal music
- 1981 in hip-hop music
- 1981 in jazz
- 1981 in progressive rock

== Events ==
=== January–April ===
- January – Nearly a year after the suicide of Ian Curtis, the surviving members of Joy Division plus Gillian Gilbert, now under the name New Order, release their debut single "Ceremony"; the single and its B-side, "In a Lonely Place", are both re-recordings of songs originally written and performed by Curtis. The single's release marks the band's first public use of the "New Order" moniker, which they retained for the remainder of their career.
- 10 January – A revival of the Gilbert and Sullivan operetta The Pirates of Penzance opens at Broadway's Uris Theatre, starring Linda Ronstadt and Rex Smith.
- 18 January – Wendy O. Williams of The Plasmatics is arrested in Milwaukee for simulating masturbation with a sledgehammer on stage. In a scuffle with the police Williams is pinned to the floor and receives a cut above the eye requiring twelve stitches.
- 24 January – Aerosmith lead singer Steven Tyler is injured in a motorcycle crash that leaves him hospitalized for two months.
- 9 February – Phil Collins releases his first solo album, Face Value, whose opening track "In the Air Tonight" popularizes the gated reverb drum sound that became ubiquitous for the next ten years; while the album ended up a smash success, Collins remained a member of Genesis until 1995.
- 14 February
  - Ultravox reach number 2 on the UK Singles Chart with "Vienna", but despite huge radio play and massive sales it is subsequently held off the top position for two consecutive weeks by Joe Dolce's novelty song "Shaddup You Face".
  - Billy Idol leaves the band Generation X to begin a solo career.
- 25 February – The 23rd Annual Grammy Awards are presented in New York, hosted by Paul Simon. Christopher Cross, with his self-titled debut album and its single "Sailing", becomes the first artist to win all four General Field awards in a single ceremony, controversially beating Pink Floyd's The Wall for Album of the Year.
- 14 March – Suffering from bleeding ulcers, Eric Clapton is admitted to United Hospital in Saint Paul, Minnesota, USA. Clapton's 60-city tour of the US is cancelled, and he remains in hospital for a month.
- 21 March – Yellow Magic Orchestra release their fourth studio album, BGM; the album is the first to make use of the Roland TR-808 drum machine, which would go on to become an influential device in both electronic dance music and hip-hop.
- 27 March – Ozzy Osbourne bites the head off a dove at a CBS record label gathering in Los Angeles.
- 4 April – British pop group Bucks Fizz wins the 26th Eurovision Song Contest, held at the RDS Simmonscourt Pavilion, Dublin, with the song "Making Your Mind Up".
- 11 April – Van Halen's lead guitarist Eddie Van Halen marries actress Valerie Bertinelli.
- 12 April – Soviet orchestral conductor Maxim Shostakovich (son of Dmitri) defects while on tour in West Germany with his son.
- 18 April – Yes announce that they are breaking up. (They reunited frequently in years to come).
- 20 April – The Mamas & the Papas' John Phillips is sentenced to five years in jail after pleading guilty to drug possession charges. Phillips' sentence was then suspended after thirty days in exchange for 250 hours of community service.
- 22 April – Eric Clapton is taken to hospital suffering from bruised ribs and a lacerated shin, following a car accident in Seattle, Washington.
- 26 April/27 April/28 April – Gary Numan performs three sold out 'farewell concerts' at Wembley Arena, following his announcement to retire from live work at the height of his popularity. (He returned to live performance less than two years later.)
- 27 April – Ringo Starr and Barbara Bach marry, in London, England.

=== May–August ===
- 2 May – British vocalist Sheena Easton hits No. 1 in the US with "Morning Train (9 to 5)" following a swift rise to fame as the result of a reality TV show.
- 9 May – Adam and the Ants single "Stand and Deliver" enters the UK Singles Chart at number 1. It remains at number 1 for five consecutive weeks and will sell over one million copies, becoming the years third best selling single in the UK.
- 14 May – Diana Ross signs with RCA Records (EMI internationally), leaving Motown Records, her label of two decades. The $20,000,000 deal is the most lucrative recording contract in history at that time.
- 15 May – A riot breaks out at The Ritz rock club in New York when Public Image Ltd plays behind a videoscreen while completely different music plays over the club's speakers.
- 16 May – Adam and the Ants tops the UK Albums Chart for the tenth consecutive week with Kings of the Wild Frontier.
- 30 May – A reformed The Human League have their first commercial success as "The Sound of the Crowd" climbs to number 12 on the UK Singles Chart.
- 4 June – U2 appears on The Tomorrow Show with Tom Snyder, their first U.S. television appearance.
- 5 June – The TV series Night Flight, a variety show featuring music documentaries and videos, is premiered on the USA Network.
- 6 June – Kerrang! magazine publishes its first issue. Angus Young of AC/DC is on the cover.
- 30 June – Jerry Lee Lewis is rushed to hospital in Memphis for emergency surgery for a tear in his stomach. Despite being given less than a 50% chance of survival, he eventually pulls through.
- 13 July – Duran Duran release the single "Girls on Film". Accompanied by a highly controversial music video that is censored for airplay on MTV and banned by BBC the song becomes the band's first big hit, eventually peaking at number 5 on the UK Singles Chart during an 11-week chart run.
- 27 July – Stevie Nicks releases debut solo album Bella Donna, which sold 4 million copies in the US alone.
- 1 August
  - MTV broadcasts for the first time on cable television in the United States, playing music videos 24 hours a day. First to air is "Video Killed the Radio Star" by The Buggles.
  - The success of Stars On 45 leads to a short-lived medley craze. The most successful imitator of the Stars On 45 format is, rather unexpectedly, the Royal Philharmonic Orchestra, whose "Hooked On Classics (Parts 1&2)" reaches number two in the charts.
- 23 August – The Violent Femmes are discovered by members of The Pretenders busking outside a Milwaukee venue and are invited to play a 10-minute acoustic set as a second opening act in the Pretenders' show that night.

=== September–December ===
- 5 September – Soft Cell tops the UK Singles Chart with "Tainted Love". The song also tops the chart the following week and becomes the second best selling single in the UK in 1981.
- 19 September
  - Simon & Garfunkel perform a free reunion concert in New York City's Central Park attended by over 500,000 fans.
  - Adam and the Ants have their second chart-topping single of the year as "Prince Charming" reach number 1 on the UK Singles Chart. It remains at number one for four consecutive weeks and becomes the years fourth best selling single in the UK.
- 26 September – Iron Maiden hires Samson lead singer Bruce Bruce AKA Bruce Dickinson to replace Paul Di'Anno. Dickinson will finish off the last 7 dates of the Killer World Tour.
- 16 October – The Human League release Dare. A huge commercial and critical success, it spent 69 weeks on the UK Albums Chart including four weeks at number 1 and be certified platinum in the UK, and gold in the US.
- 26 October – Iron Maiden plays its first show with Bruce Dickinson as the new lead singer in Bologna, Italy.
- 27 October – The British Phonographic Industry takes out newspaper ads unveiling its new slogan: "Home Taping Is Killing Music". The ads advocate a levy on blank cassette tapes.
- 31 October – Punk band Fear makes a memorable appearance on Saturday Night Live. A group of fans storm the stage and damage TV equipment while moshing, resulting in the show cutting to commercial.
- 18 November – While sitting in Tom's Restaurant in New York City, Suzanne Vega composes the song "Tom's Diner".
- 21 November – Orchestral Manoeuvres in the Dark hits number 3 on the UK Albums Chart with their third album Architecture & Morality. Including three UK top-5 singles, "Souvenir", "Joan of Arc" and "Maid of Orleans", it will remain on the chart for 37 weeks and be certified platinum in the UK.
- 5 December – The 10th OTI Festival, held at the National Auditorium in Mexico City, Mexico, is won by the song "Latino", written by Pablo Herrero and José Luis Armenteros, and performed by Francisco representing Spain.
- 11 December – The Human League reach number one on the UK Singles Chart with Don't You Want Me. The song remains at number one for five consecutive weeks and become the years best selling single in the UK.
- 18 December – An estimated 35 million people around the world watch a live satellite transmission of a Rod Stewart concert at the Los Angeles Forum. It is the first broadcast of its kind since Elvis Presley's "Aloha from Hawaii" special in 1973.
- 31 December
  - Benny Andersson, recently divorced from Anni-Frid Lyngstad, marries TV presenter Mona Nörklit.
  - The tenth annual New Year's Rockin' Eve special airs on ABC, with appearances by Four Tops, Rick Springfield, Barry Manilow, Alabama and Rick Springfield.

=== Also in 1981 ===
- The organ at the famous Heinävesi Church in Finland is renewed, using locks from the original organ.
- Hal Willner "invents" the modern tribute album with Amacord Nino Rota.

== Bands formed ==
- See Musical groups established in 1981

== Bands disbanded ==
- See Musical groups disestablished in 1981

== Albums released ==
=== January ===
Day	Album	Artist	Notes
3	Wild-Eyed Southern Boys	38 Special	-
12	The Nature of the Beast	April Wine	
15	In Our Lifetime	Marvin Gaye	-
15	Stands for Decibels	The dB's	Debut
16	Paradise Theatre	Styx	
16	Turn Back	Toto	-
16	The Wild, the Willing and the Innocent	UFO	-
16	Radioland	Nicolette Larson	-
19	Take My Time	Sheena Easton	
23	Kiss Me Deadly	Generation X	-
23	Trust	Elvis Costello and the Attractions	-
28	Healing	Todd Rundgren	-
28	Welcome to the Wrecking Ball!	Grace Slick	-
30	Captured	Journey	Live
30	Photographs as Memories	Eyeless in Gaza	Debut
?	Mondo Bongo	The Boomtown Rats	-
?	Frost and Fire	Cirith Ungol	-
?	Playing to Win	Rick Nelson	
?	There Must Be a Better World Somewhere	B. B. King	-
?	To the Bone	Kris Kristofferson	-

=== February ===
Day	Album	Artist	Notes
2	You Must Believe in Spring	Bill Evans	-
4	Urban Chipmunk	Alvin and the Chipmunks	-
4	Evangeline	Emmylou Harris	-
6	The Fool Circle	Nazareth	-
9	Difficult to Cure	Rainbow	
12	Moving Pictures	Rush	-
13	Face Value	Phil Collins	solo debut
13	St. Valentine's Day Massacre	Motör Headgirl School	EP
13	Fire Down Under	Riot	-
16	Killers	Iron Maiden	
17	Being with You	Smokey Robinson	-
17	To Love Again	Diana Ross	Compilation
20	...And Don't the Kids Just Love It	Television Personalities	Debut
20	Another Ticket	Eric Clapton	-
27	Point of Entry	Judas Priest	-
?	Working Class Dog	Rick Springfield	-
?	Another One Rides the Bus	"Weird Al" Yankovic	EP
?	Bangkok Shocks, Saigon Shakes, Hanoi Rocks	Hanoi Rocks	-
?	Atomkraft? Nein, Danke!	Earthstar	-
?	Coconut Telegraph	Jimmy Buffett	-
?	Feels So Right	Alabama	-
?	From the Tea-rooms of Mars ....	Landscape	-
?	Higher Plane	Al Green	-
?	Juice	Juice Newton	-
?	My Life in the Bush of Ghosts	Brian Eno – David Byrne	-
?	Seven Year Ache	Rosanne Cash	-
?	Stray Cats	Stray Cats	-
?	The League of Gentlemen	Robert Fripp and The League of Gentlemen	-

=== March ===
Day	Album	Artist	Notes
2	Intensities in 10 Cities	Ted Nugent	Live
6	Journeys to Glory	Spandau Ballet	-
9	Magnets	The Vapors	-
10	There Goes the Neighborhood	Joe Walsh	-
13	Never Too Late	Status Quo	-
13	We'll Bring the House Down	Slade	-
16	Breaker	Accept	-
16	Face Dances	The Who	-
20	Time Tells No Lies	Praying Mantis	-
21	Grand Slam	The Isley Brothers	-
25	DEV-O Live	Devo	Live Album
26	Fancy Free	The Oak Ridge Boys	-
26	The Dude	Quincy Jones	-
27	Carl Wilson	Carl Wilson	-
30	Extended Play	The Pretenders	EP
31	Music for Stowaways	British Electric Foundation	-
?	390° of Simulated Stereo	Pere Ubu	Live
?	Chariots of Fire	Vangelis	Soundtrack
?	Dad Loves His Work	James Taylor	-
?	Directions	Miles Davis	-
?	Sucking in the Seventies	The Rolling Stones	Compilation
?	Franke & The Knockouts	Franke & The Knockouts	-
?	Hardware	Krokus	-
?	Honi Soit	John Cale	-
?	Long Play Album aka Stars on Long Play	Stars on 45	-
?	Nightwalker	Gino Vannelli	-
?	No Fun After Midnight	A II Z	EP
?	Party 'Til You're Broke	Rufus	-
?	Rock Away	Phoebe Snow	-
?	Short Note	Matt Finish	-
?	Solid Gold	Gang of Four	-
?	Somewhere Over the Rainbow	Willie Nelson	-
?	Waiata	Split Enz	-
?	White Lace & Black Leather	Helix	-

=== April ===
Day	Album	Artist	Notes
1	Reckoning	Grateful Dead	Live
1	Rock Steady with Flo & Eddie	Flo & Eddie	-
2	Modern Times	Jefferson Starship	-
6	Come an' Get It	Whitesnake	-
6	The DeBarges	DeBarge	-
6	Fun in Space	Roger Taylor	-
6	Prayers on Fire	The Birthday Party	-
6	The Completion Backward Principle	The Tubes	-
7	Street Songs	Rick James	-
10	Faith	The Cure	-
10	The Flowers of Romance	Public Image Ltd.	-
10	Spellbound	Tygers of Pan Tang	
11	A Woman Needs Love	Raydio	-
13	Don't Say No	Billy Squier	-
13	Of Skins and Heart	The Church	-
14	The Electric Spanking of War Babies	Funkadelic	-
15	What Cha' Gonna Do for Me	Chaka Khan	-
17	Future Shock	Gillan	
17	Go for It	Stiff Little Fingers	-
20	Hit and Run	Girlschool	-
20	Twangin...	Dave Edmunds	-
23	Where Do You Go When You Dream	Anne Murray	-
27	As Falls Wichita, so Falls Wichita Falls	Pat Metheny and Lyle Mays	-
27	Slates	The Fall	EP
29	Fair Warning	Van Halen	-
29	Zebop!	Santana	-
?	¡Alarma!	Daniel Amos	-
?	Bad for Good	Jim Steinman	-
?	Dedication	Gary U.S. Bonds	-
?	El Rayo-X	David Lindley	-
?	Goddo Live: Best Seat in the House	Goddo	Live
?	Mistaken Identity	Kim Carnes	-
?	The Nightcomers	Holocaust	-
?	Punks Not Dead	The Exploited	-

=== May ===
Day	Album	Artist	Notes
1	Nick Mason's Fictitious Sports	Nick Mason's Fictitious Sports	
5	Hard Promises	Tom Petty and the Heartbreakers	-
5	Positive Touch	The Undertones	-
6	Wild Gift	X	-
8	Shock Tactics	Samson	-
8	The One That You Love	Air Supply	-
8	Wha'ppen?	The Beat	-
11	Computer World	Kraftwerk	-
11	Balin	Marty Balin	-
11	Nightclubbing	Grace Jones	-
11	Shut Up 'n' Play Yer Guitar	Frank Zappa	Live
14	Breaking All the Rules	Peter Frampton	-
14	It Must Be Magic	Teena Marie	-
15	East Side Story	Squeeze	-
15	Long Distance Voyager	The Moody Blues	-
15	Talk Talk Talk	The Psychedelic Furs	
17	Tinsel Town Rebellion	Frank Zappa	-
18	Knights of the Sound Table	Cameo	-
20	Magnetic Fields	Jean-Michel Jarre	-
20	The Fox	Elton John	-
22	Anthem	Toyah	-
25	Hard 'n' Heavy	Anvil	Debut
29	Heaven Up Here	Echo & the Bunnymen	-
29	In Concert	Amy Grant	Live
29	Present Arms	UB40	-
?	Beyond the Valley of 1984	The Plasmatics	-
?	Dedicated to Peter Kürten	Whitehouse	-
?	Look Out!	20/20	-
?	Mecca for Moderns	The Manhattan Transfer	-
?	Quasimodo's Dream	The Reels	-
?	Quit Dreaming and Get on the Beam	Bill Nelson	-
?	Red	Black Uhuru	-
?	Sondra	The Sports	-

=== June ===
Day	Album	Artist	Notes
1	The Baron	Johnny Cash	-
2	Somewhere in England	George Harrison	-
5	A Product Of... (Participation)	Thompson Twins	-
8	Season of Glass	Yoko Ono	-
12	Black & White	The Pointer Sisters	-
15	Duran Duran	Duran Duran	Debut
15	Love Songs	Cliff Richard	-
16	Made in America	The Carpenters	-
19	Jumpin' Jive	Joe Jackson	-
19	Juju	Siouxsie & the Banshees	-
19	Only a Lad	Oingo Boingo	Debut
22	Fire of Unknown Origin	Blue Öyster Cult	-
22	What's THIS For...!	Killing Joke	-
29	Kim Wilde	Kim Wilde	Debut
29	The Visitor	Mick Fleetwood	-
30	As Far as Siam	Red Rider	-
30	Breakin' Away	Al Jarreau	-
30	Earthshaker	Y&T	-
?	Corazón de poeta	Jeanette	-
?	Children of Paradise – The Greatest Hits of Boney M. – Vol. 2	Boney M.	Compilation
?	Cut Lunch	Models	EP
?	Deuce	Kurtis Blow	-
?	Fresh Fruit in Foreign Places	Kid Creole and the Coconuts	-
?	Here Comes the Night	David Johansen	-
?	In the Pocket	Commodores	-
?	I've Got the Rock'n'Rolls Again	The Joe Perry Project	-
?	Magic, Murder and the Weather	Magazine	-
?	No Sleep 'til Hammersmith	Motörhead	Live
?	Party	Iggy Pop	-
?	Reflector	Pablo Cruise	-
?	Renaissance	Village People	-
?	RocKihnRoll	The Greg Kihn Band	-
?	Share Your Love	Kenny Rogers	-
?	Six Pack	Black Flag	EP
?	Some Days Are Diamonds	John Denver	-
?	Wanted Dread And Alive	Peter Tosh	-

=== July ===
Day	Album	Artist	Notes
3	4	Foreigner	-
3	The Friends of Mr Cairo	Jon and Vangelis	-
3	Whomp That Sucker	Sparks	-
6	High 'n' Dry	Def Leppard	-
6	Precious Time	Pat Benatar	-
8	Beauty and the Beat	The Go-Go's	-
20	Escape	Journey	-
20	El Loco	ZZ Top	-
20	Pleasant Dreams	The Ramones	-
27	Bella Donna	Stevie Nicks	Solo Debut
27	KooKoo	Debbie Harry	Solo Debut
27	Bucks Fizz	Bucks Fizz	Debut
28	You Want It You Got It	Bryan Adams	-
29	The Time	The Time	Debut
31	Time	Electric Light Orchestra	-
31	Step by Step	Eddie Rabbitt	-
?	Blue and Gray	Poco	-
?	Document and Eyewitness	Wire	-
?	Dexterity	Jo Jo Zep & The Falcons	-
?	Dreamtime	Tom Verlaine	-
?	Endless Love	Various Artists	Soundtrack
?	Freetime	Spyro Gyra	-
?	Girls to Chat and Boys to Bounce	Foghat	-
?	Heavy Metal Soundtrack	Various Artists	Soundtrack
?	Hoy-Hoy!	Little Feat	Compilation
?	It's a Condition	Romeo Void	-
?	The Man with the Horn	Miles Davis	-
?	Marauder	Blackfoot	-
?	Night of the Demon	Demon	-
?	Party Mix!	The B-52's	Remix
?	Pirates	Rickie Lee Jones	-
?	The Pirates of Penzance Broadway Cast Album	Various Artists	Broadway cast recording
?	Sirocco	Australian Crawl	-
?	Three Quartets	Chick Corea	-
?	Walking Wild	New England	-
?	Was (Not Was)	Was (Not Was)	Debut
?	Word of Mouth	Jaco Pastorius	-

=== August ===
Day	Album	Artist	Notes
7	Pretenders II	The Pretenders	
10	Friday Night in San Francisco	Al Di Meola, John McLaughlin and Paco de Lucía	Live
12	Shot of Love	Bob Dylan	-
12	Never Too Much	Luther Vandross	Debut
18	Dark Continent	Wall of Voodoo	-
20	Love All the Hurt Away	Aretha Franklin	-
21	Sleep No More	The Comsat Angels	-
24	Tattoo You	The Rolling Stones	-
25	Scissors Cut	Art Garfunkel	-
25	Sorry Ma, Forgot to Take Out the Trash	The Replacements	Debut
26	Dead Set	Grateful Dead	Live
26	New Traditionalists	Devo	-
28	Alive Alone	Mickey Thomas	-
28	The Spirit's in It	Patti LaBelle	-
31	Fire of Love	The Gun Club	-
?	Brothers of the Road	The Allman Brothers Band	-
?	Signals, Calls, and Marches	Mission of Burma	EP
?	Torch	Carly Simon	-
?	Give the People What They Want	The Kinks	-
?	Heartbreak Radio	Rita Coolidge	-
?	The Innocent Age	Dan Fogelberg	-
?	Joy	The Minutemen	EP
?	King Cool	Donnie Iris	-
?	Level 42	Level 42	-
?	The Pressure Is On	Hank Williams, Jr.	-
?	Short Back 'n' Sides	Ian Hunter	-
?	Simplicity	Tim Curry	-
?	There's No Gettin' Over Me	Ronnie Milsap	-
?	Thirsty Ears	Powder Blues Band	-
?	Whitford/St. Holmes	Brad Whitford and Derek St. Holmes	-

=== September ===
Day	Album	Artist	Notes
1	Private Eyes	Hall & Oates	-
1	Special Forces	Alice Cooper	-
2	1234	Ronnie Wood	-
4	Dead Ringer	Meat Loaf	-
4	Dance	Gary Numan	-
4	Strait Country	George Strait	-
4	Why Do Fools Fall in Love	Diana Ross	-
4	Sons and Fascination/Sister Feelings Call	Simple Minds	-
7	Burning Blue Soul	Matt Johnson	Solo Debut
11	Rage in Eden	Ultravox	-
12	Hanx!	Stiff Little Fingers	Live
14	Maiden Japan	Iron Maiden	Live EP
14	Songs in the Attic	Billy Joel	Live
14	Wired for Sound	Cliff Richard	-
18	Abacab	Genesis	
21	You Could Have Been with Me	Sheena Easton	-
23	Peter Cetera	Peter Cetera	Solo Debut
23	You Are What You Is	Frank Zappa	-
24	Something Special	Kool & the Gang	-
25	Denim and Leather	Saxon	
25	Wild Things	The Creatures	EP
?	Allied Forces	Triumph	-
?	Boonoonoonoos	Boney M.	-
?	Buchenwald	Whitehouse	-
?	Camouflage	Rufus	-
?	Cats & Dogs	Mental As Anything	-
?	Caught in Flux	Eyeless in Gaza	-
?	Dangerous Acquaintances	Marianne Faithfull	-
?	Deaf	You've Got Foetus on Your Breath	-
?	Gosh It's...	Bad Manners	-
?	Grand Funk Lives	Grand Funk Railroad	-
?	Happy Birthday	Altered Images	Debut
?	Hooligans	The Who	Compilation
?	If I Should Love Again	Barry Manilow	-
?	Killing Time	Massacre	Debut
?	Kix	Kix	-
?	Lord Upminster	Ian Dury	-
?	Love Byrd	Donald Byrd and 125th St, NYC	-
?	Magic Windows	Herbie Hancock	-
?	Mark of the Mole	The Residents	-
?	MSG	Michael Schenker Group	-
?	Nine Tonight	Bob Seger and the Silver Bullet Band	Live
?	Penthouse and Pavement	Heaven 17	-
?	Red Mecca	Cabaret Voltaire	-
?	Rock Until You Drop	Raven	-
?	Snaz	Nazareth	Live
?	Sunnyboys	Sunnyboys	-
?	Time Exposure	Little River Band	-
?	Walk Under Ladders	Joan Armatrading	-
?	Wanna Be a Star	Chilliwack	-

=== October ===
Day	Album	Artist	Notes
2	Discipline	King Crimson	-
2	Ghost in the Machine	The Police	-
2	In the Garden	Eurythmics	Debut
2	7	Madness	-
5	Kollaps	Einstürzende Neubauten	-
5	Speak & Spell	Depeche Mode	-
7	Get Lucky	Loverboy	-
8	Looking Back with Love	Mike Love	solo debut
9	Still	Joy Division	Compilation
12	Days of Innocence	Moving Pictures	-
12	October	U2	-
14	Controversy	Prince	-
16	Mask	Bauhaus	-
16	Dare	The Human League	-
16	The Best of Blondie	Blondie	Compilation
19	Underneath the Colours	INXS	-
21	Bobby and the Midnites	Bobby and the Midnites	-
23	Circle of Love	Steve Miller Band	-
23	Raise!	Earth, Wind & Fire	-
23	Almost Blue	Elvis Costello and the Attractions	-
26	Freeze Frame	The J. Geils Band	-
26	Greatest Hits	Queen	Compilation
29	Exit...Stage Left	Rush	Live
?	Diary of a Madman	Ozzy Osbourne	
?	Law and Order	Lindsey Buckingham	-
?	Sonic Attack	Hawkwind	-
?	Don't Stop	Billy Idol	EP
?	Camera Camera	Renaissance	-
?	Premonition	Survivor	-
?	This Is the Way	Rossington Collins Band	-
?	Present Arms in Dub	UB40	Remix
?	Big City	Merle Haggard	-
?	Chances Are	Bob Marley & the Wailers	Compilation of previously unreleased material
?	Christmas Album	Boney M.	Christmas
?	Coup de Grâce	Mink DeVille	-
?	Face to Face	GQ	-
?	Fourth Drawer Down	Associates	-
?	Gonna Ball	Stray Cats	-
?	Inside You	The Isley Brothers	-
?	Living Eyes	Bee Gees	-
?	Local and/or General	Models	-
?	Love Is Only Feeling	Donovan	-
?	Physical	Olivia Newton-John	-
?	Quarterflash	Quarterflash	-
?	Round Trip	The Knack	-
?	See Jungle! See Jungle! Go Join Your Gang, Yeah. City All Over! Go Ape Crazy	Bow Wow Wow	-
?	The Sound of the Sand and Other Songs of the Pedestrian	David Thomas & the Pedestrians	-
?	Strictly Personal	The Romantics	-
?	Tom Tom Club	Tom Tom Club	-
?	Wrap It!	Doug and the Slugs	-

=== November ===
Day	Album	Artist	Notes
2	Re·ac·tor	Neil Young and Crazy Horse	-
4	Mob Rules	Black Sabbath	US
4	Saúde	Rita Lee	-
6	Architecture & Morality	Orchestral Manoeuvres in the Dark	-
6	Prince Charming	Adam and the Ants	-
6	Shake It Up	The Cars	-
6	Tonight I'm Yours	Rod Stewart	-
6	Great Gonzos! The Best of Ted Nugent	Ted Nugent	Compilation
9	Business as Usual	Men at Work	Australia, debut
9	La Folie	The Stranglers	-
9	On the Way to the Sky	Neil Diamond	-
10	Too Fast for Love	Mötley Crüe	-
10	Music from "The Elder"	Kiss	-
10	Memories	Barbra Streisand	Compilation +3 new tracks
11	The Jacksons Live!	The Jacksons	Live
11	Youth of America	Wipers	-
13	Movement	New Order	-
13	Till Deaf Do Us Part	Slade	-
13	Tin Drum	Japan	-
16	Changestwobowie	David Bowie	Compilation
16	Renegade	Thin Lizzy	-
16	Take It Off	Chic	-
20	Stop and Smell the Roses	Ringo Starr	-
23	The Catherine Wheel	David Byrne	-
23	Christmas Album	Boney M.	-
23	A Collection of Great Dance Songs	Pink Floyd	Compilation with alternate mixes
23	I Love Rock 'n' Roll	Joan Jett & the Blackhearts	-
23	Too Late the Hero	John Entwistle	-
27	For Those About to Rock We Salute You	AC/DC	-
27	Non-Stop Erotic Cabaret	Soft Cell	-
27	Ten Out of 10	10cc	-
30	Bad Religion	Bad Religion	EP
30	Best of the Blues Brothers	The Blues Brothers	Compilation
30	The Visitors	ABBA	-
?	Crazy Nights	Tygers Of Pan Tang	-
?	Adventures in Modern Recording	The Buggles	-
?	In Concert Volume Two	Amy Grant	Live
?	The Ascension	Glenn Branca	-
?	Christmas Wishes	Anne Murray	Christmas
?	From the Lions Mouth	The Sound	-
?	Pearls	Elkie Brooks	-
?	Place without a Postcard	Midnight Oil	-
?	The Poet	Bobby Womack	-
?	She Shot Me Down	Frank Sinatra	-
?	Still the Same Ole Me	George Jones	-
?	Take No Prisoners	Molly Hatchet	-

=== December ===
Day	Album	Artist	Notes
7	Ten Years of Harmony	The Beach Boys	Compilation
15	LC	The Durutti Column	-
30	For Those Who Think Young	Rough Trade	-
?	Damaged	Black Flag	-
?	Drop Down and Get Me	Del Shannon	-
?	The Best of Top of the Pops '81	Top of the Poppers	-
?	The Blasters	The Blasters	-
?	In God We Trust, Inc.	Dead Kennedys	EP
?	Small Change	Prism	-
?	Welcome to Hell	Venom	-
?	Wilder	The Teardrop Explodes	-

=== Release date unknown ===
- Adventures in Clubland – Modern Romance
- Alles ist gut – Deutsch Amerikanische Freundschaft
- Begin the Beguine – Julio Iglesias
- B.L.T. – Jack Bruce, Bill Lordan & Robin Trower
- Breakin' the Chains – Don Dokken
- Celebration – Johnny Mathis
- Changing Hearts – Polyrock
- Chasanova – Chaz Jankel
- Claro Que Si – Yello
- Condition Red - Red Rockers
- Cool Night – Paul Davis
- Cowboy Jubilee – Riders in the Sky
- Curiosum – Cluster
- Deceit – This Heat
- Directions – Miles Davis
- Drama of Exile – Nico
- Escape Artist – Garland Jeffreys
- The Evil One – Roky Erickson and the Aliens
- Fire Wind – Electric Sun
- Free Lancing – James Blood Ulmer
- Hits Right Up Your Street – The Shadows
- Individuellos – La Düsseldorf
- Inner City Front – Bruce Cockburn
- Insect and Individual Silenced – Nurse with Wound
- Is This a Cool World or What? – Karla DeVito
- Jane Siberry – Jane Siberry
- Jealousy - Nitty Gritty Dirt Band
- La voce del Padrone – Franco Battiato
- Let Them Eat Jellybeans! – Various Artists
- Live in Tasmania – John Fahey
- The Lounge Lizards – The Lounge Lizards
- Lustwandel – Hans-Joachim Roedelius
- Minor Threat – Minor Threat – EP
- Material – Moebius & Plank
- Mommy Don't Love Daddy Anymore – Resurrection Band
- Mondo Mando - David Grisman
- Never Say Die – Petra
- Odyshape – The Raincoats
- Penis Envy – Crass
- Peperina – Serú Girán
- Play Me Out – Helen Reddy
- Pleasure – Girls at Our Best!
- Public Service (EP) – Various Artists
- The Punch Line – Minutemen
- Quiero Ser – Menudo
- Reflections – Gil Scott-Heron
- Repercussion – The dB's
- Secret Combination – Randy Crawford
- Selbstportrait – Hans-Joachim Roedelius
- Sky 3 – Sky
- Speechless – Fred Frith
- Standing Together – Midnight Star
- Stick Figure Neighbourhood – Spoons
- Suburban Lawns - Suburban Lawns
- Sunrise in Different Dimensions – Sun Ra
- Trio – Trio
- Wünsche fliegen übers Meer – Die Flippers
- Years Ago – The Statler Brothers
- You're the Guy I Want to Share My Money With – Laurie Anderson, William S. Burroughs and John Giorno
- Youth of America – Wipers

== Biggest hit singles ==
The following songs achieved the highest chart positions in the charts of 1981.

#	Artist	Title	Year	Country	Chart Entries
1	Kim Carnes	Bette Davis Eyes	1981	(United States)	US Billboard 1 - Mar 1981 (26 weeks), US BB 1 of 1981, Record World 1 - 1981, US Radio 1 of 1981 (peak 1 16 weeks), Canada 1 - Apr 1981 (14 weeks), France (SNEP) 1 - Jun 1981 (5 months), France 1 - Jun 1981 (5 weeks), Brazil 1 of 1981, Switzerland 1 - Jun 1981 (12 weeks), Norway 1 - Jun 1981 (15 weeks), Italy 1 for 3 weeks - Nov 1981, Germany 1 - Jun 1981 (5 months), ODK Germany 1 - Jun 1981 (27 weeks) (7 weeks at number 1) (15 weeks in top 10), Australia 1 for 5 weeks - Jun 1981, Springbok 1 - Jun 1981 (16 weeks), France 1 for 15 weeks - Jul 1981, Germany 1 for 7 weeks - Jul 1981, Spain 1 for 1 week - Sep 1981, Grammy in 1981, Top Song of 1981 of the Billboard 50th list, US CashBox 2 of 1981, WABC NY 2 of 1981, ARC 2 of 1981 (peak 1 21 weeks), France (InfoDisc) 2 of the 1980s (peak 1, 43 weeks, 1,190k sales estimated, 1981), Austria 2 - Jul 1981 (4 months), Switzerland 2 of 1981, Canada 2 of 1981, South Africa 2 of 1981, Sweden (alt) 4 - May 1981 (22 weeks), US Gold (certified by RIAA in Jun 1981), Italy 5 of 1981, Belgium 6 - May 1981 (10 weeks), Australia 6 of 1981, UK 10 - May 1981 (9 weeks), Billboard 50th song 12, 55th Billboard 100 14 (1981), Billboard100 15, Holland 16 - May 1981 (8 weeks), nuTsie 16 of 1980s, Germany 18 of the 1980s (peak 1 20 weeks), OzNet 45, Holland free40 56 of 1981, Scrobulate 66 of 80s, RIAA 268, Acclaimed 738 (1981), RYM 16 of 1981
2	Stars On 45	Stars On 45 Medley	1981	(Netherlands)	US Billboard 1 - Apr 1981 (19 weeks), Record World 1 - 1981, Canada 1 - May 1981 (14 weeks), Holland 1 - Jan 1981 (13 weeks), Austria 1 - May 1981 (6 months), Switzerland 1 - May 1981 (14 weeks), Switzerland 1 of 1981, Belgium 1 - Feb 1981 (12 weeks), Germany 1 - Mar 1981 (7 months), ODK Germany 1 - Mar 1981 (30 weeks) (7 weeks at number 1) (22 weeks in top 10), Eire 1 for 3 weeks - May 1981, Canada RPM 1 for 12 weeks - May 1981, Canada 1 of 1981, New Zealand 1 for 7 weeks - Jun 1981, Australia 1 for 4 weeks - Jul 1981, Germany 1 for 7 weeks - May 1981, Spain 1 for 3 weeks - Jul 1981, UK 2 - Apr 1981 (14 weeks), Australia 2 of 1981, US Gold (certified by RIAA in Jul 1981), Germany Gold (certified by BMieV in 1981), Norway 5 - Jun 1981 (10 weeks), Germany 5 of the 1980s (peak 1 24 weeks), Sweden (alt) 7 - Jun 1981 (18 weeks), Springbok 10 - Jun 1981 (7 weeks), US CashBox 13 of 1981, WABC NY 21 of 1981, US BB 24 of 1981, ARC 32 of 1981 (peak 1 13 weeks), Italy 54 of 1981, Brazil 91 of 1981
3	Olivia Newton-John	Physical	1981	(United Kingdom) / (Australia)	US Billboard 1 - Oct 1981 (26 weeks), US BB 1 of 1982, Record World 1 - 1981, Switzerland 1 - Nov 1981 (12 weeks), Belgium 1 - Oct 1981 (12 weeks), Canada RPM 1 for 6 weeks - Dec 1981, New Zealand 1 for 3 weeks - Dec 1981, Australia 1 for 5 weeks - Nov 1981, Top Song of 1982 of the Billboard 50th list, WABC NY 2 of 1982, France 2 - Nov 1981 (1 week), Brazil 2 of 1982, US Platinum (certified by RIAA in Jan 1982), ARC 3 of 1981 (peak 1 23 weeks), US Radio 3 of 1981 (peak 1 16 weeks), Holland 4 - Oct 1981 (10 weeks), Germany 4 - Jan 1982 (5 months), ODK Germany 4 - Nov 1981 (21 weeks) (10 weeks in top 10), US CashBox 6 of 1981, Billboard 50th song 6, UK 7 - Oct 1981 (16 weeks), France (SNEP) 7 - Nov 1981 (2 months), Austria 7 - Dec 1981 (2 months), Billboard100 8, 55th Billboard 100 8 (1981), Springbok 11 - Aug 1982 (6 weeks), Switzerland 14 of 1981, Sweden (alt) 15 - Nov 1981 (10 weeks), Canada 15 of 1982, POP 41 of 1981, nuTsie 51 of 1980s, Italy 62 of 1982, Germany 201 of the 1980s (peak 4 15 weeks), OzNet 319, RYM 124 of 1981
4	Diana Ross & Lionel Richie	Endless Love	1981	(United States)	US Billboard 1 - Jul 1981 (26 weeks), US CashBox 1 of 1981, Record World 1 - 1981, WABC NY 1 of 1981, ARC 1 of 1981 (peak 1 20 weeks), Canada RPM 1 for 6 weeks - Sep 1981, Australia 1 for 4 weeks - Oct 1981, Springbok 1 - Oct 1981 (19 weeks), US BB 2 of 1981, US Radio 2 of 1981 (peak 1 15 weeks), Oscar in 1981 (film 'Endless Love') (Nominated), Grammy in 1981 (Nominated), Golden Globe in 1981 (film 'Endless Love') (Nominated), US Platinum (certified by RIAA in Oct 1981), Canada 3 of 1981, Holland 4 - Sep 1981 (10 weeks), Sweden (alt) 5 - Sep 1981 (10 weeks), Brazil 5 of 1981, Switzerland 6 - Sep 1981 (7 weeks), South Africa 6 of 1981, UK 7 - Sep 1981 (12 weeks), Norway 8 - Sep 1981 (3 weeks), Australia 8 of 1981, Belgium 9 - Sep 1981 (8 weeks), Billboard 50th song 13, POP 14 of 1981, 55th Billboard 100 15 (1981), Billboard100 16, nuTsie 18 of 1980s, Italy 84 of 1981
5	Soft Cell	Tainted Love	1981	(United Kingdom)	UK 1 - Aug 1981 (30 weeks), Canada 1 - Nov 1981 (18 weeks), France 1 - Aug 1981 (4 weeks), Belgium 1 - Oct 1981 (9 weeks), ODK Germany 1 - Oct 1981 (26 weeks) (2 weeks at number 1) (16 weeks in top 10), Canada RPM 1 for 3 weeks - Feb 1982, Australia 1 for 3 weeks - Feb 1982, Springbok 1 - Dec 1981 (19 weeks), Germany 1 for 2 weeks - Nov 1981, Brit best song 1982, Austria 2 - Dec 1981 (3 months), Switzerland 2 - Nov 1981 (15 weeks), Germany 2 - Jan 1982 (5 months), Scrobulate 2 of 80s, Australia 3 of 1982, Sweden (alt) 4 - Oct 1981 (24 weeks), France (SNEP) 4 - Dec 1981 (3 months), UK Gold (certified by BPI in Sep 1981), Holland 5 - Oct 1981 (9 weeks), South Africa 5 of 1982, Canada 7 of 1982, US Billboard 8 - Jan 1982 (43 weeks), Holland free40 9 of 1981, US BB 11 of 1982, POP 18 of 1982, nuTsie 19 of 1980s, ARC 29 of 1982 (peak 5 20 weeks), Germany 37 of the 1980s (peak 1 18 weeks), KROQ 38 of 1982, Virgin 41, US CashBox 50 of 1982, US Radio 59 of 1982 (peak 8 9 weeks), UKMIX 95, Acclaimed 163 (1981), Belgium 242 of all time, France (InfoDisc) 255 of the 1980s (peak 4, 27 weeks, 431k sales estimated, 1981), OzNet 451, WXPN 745, RYM 4 of 1981, Guardian Pop 57, Party 142 of 2007

== Chronological table of US and UK and Japan Number One hit singles ==
US Number One singles and artist
(Weeks at Number One)

- "(Just Like) Starting Over" – John Lennon (4 weeks)
- "The Tide Is High" – Blondie (1)
- "Celebration" – Kool & the Gang (2)
- "9 to 5" – Dolly Parton (2)
- "I Love a Rainy Night" – Eddie Rabbitt (2)
- "Keep on Loving You" – REO Speedwagon (1)
- "Rapture" – Blondie (2)
- "Kiss On My List" – Daryl Hall & John Oates (3)
- "Morning Train (9 to 5)" – Sheena Easton (2)
- "Bette Davis Eyes" – Kim Carnes (9)
- "Stars on 45 Medley" – Stars On 45 (1)
- "The One That You Love" – Air Supply (1)
- "Jessie's Girl" – Rick Springfield (2)
- "Endless Love" – Diana Ross & Lionel Richie (9)
- "Arthur's Theme (Best That You Can Do)" – Christopher Cross (3)
- "Private Eyes" – Daryl Hall & John Oates (2)
- "Physical" – Olivia Newton-John (6)

UK Number One singles and artist
(Weeks at Number One)

- "There's No-one Quite Like Grandma" – St Winifred's School Choir (1)
- "Imagine" – John Lennon (4)
- "Woman" – John Lennon (2)
- "Shaddup You Face" – Joe Dolce Music Theatre (3)
- "Jealous Guy" – Roxy Music (2)
- "This Ole House" – Shakin' Stevens (3)
- "Making Your Mind Up" – Bucks Fizz (3)
- "Stand and Deliver" – Adam and the Ants (5)
- "Being With You" – Smokey Robinson (2)
- "One Day in Your Life" – Michael Jackson (2)
- "Ghost Town" – The Specials (3)
- "Green Door"- Shakin' Stevens (4)
- "Japanese Boy" – Aneka (1)
- "Tainted Love" – Soft Cell (2)
- "Prince Charming" – Adam and the Ants (4)
- "It's My Party" – Dave Stewart (the keyboardist) & Barbara Gaskin (4)
- "Every Little Thing She Does Is Magic" – The Police (1)
- "Under Pressure" – Queen & David Bowie (2)
- "Begin the Beguine" – Julio Iglesias (1)
- "Don't You Want Me" – The Human League (3)

Japanese Oricon Number One singles and artist
(Weeks at Number One)

- "Sneaker Blues" – Masahiko Kondō (2 weeks in 1980 + 3 weeks in 1981)
- "Koi wa Do!" – Toshihiko Tahara (2)
- "Cherry Blossom" – Seiko Matsuda (4)
- "Machikado Twilight" – Chanels (3)
- "Ruby no Yubiwa" – Akira Terao (10)
- "Natsu no Tobira" – Seiko Matsuda (2)
- "Blue Jeans Memory" – Masahiko Kondō (3)
- "Nagai Yoru" – Chiharu Matsuyama (3)
- "Shiroi Parasol" – Seiko Matsuda (3)
- "High School Lullaby" – Imo-kin Trio (7)
- "Gingiragin ni Sarigenaku" – Masahiko Kondō (6)
- "Kaze Tachinu" – Seiko Matsuda (1)
- "Akujo" – Miyuki Nakajima (3)
- "Sailor Fuku to Kikanjū" – Hiroko Yakushimaru (2 weeks in 1981 + 3 weeks in 1982)

== Chronological table of US and UK Number One hit albums ==
US Number One album and artist
(Weeks at Number One)

- Double Fantasy – John Lennon and Yoko Ono (7)
- Hi Infidelity – REO Speedwagon (15)
- Paradise Theatre – Styx (3)
- Mistaken Identity – Kim Carnes (4)
- Long Distance Voyager – The Moody Blues (3)
- Precious Time – Pat Benatar (1)
- 4 – Foreigner (7)
- Bella Donna – Stevie Nicks (1)
- Escape – Journey (1)
- Tattoo You – The Rolling Stones (9)
- For Those About to Rock We Salute You – AC/DC (1)

UK Number One album and artist
(Weeks at Number One)

- Super Trouper – ABBA (3)
- Kings of the Wild Frontier – Adam and the Ants (12)
- Double Fantasy – John Lennon & Yoko Ono (2)
- Face Value – Phil Collins (3)
- Stars on 45- Stars on 45 / Starsound (5)
- No Sleep 'til Hammersmith – Motörhead (1)
- Disco Daze and Disco Nites – Various Artists (1)
- Love Songs – Cliff Richard (5)
- The Official BBC Album of the Royal Wedding – Various Artists (2)
- Time – Electric Light Orchestra (2)
- Dead Ringer – Meat Loaf (2)
- Abacab – Genesis (2)
- Ghost in the Machine – The Police (3)
- Dare – The Human League (1)
- Shaky – Shakin' Stevens (1)
- Greatest Hits – Queen (4)
- Chart Hits '81 – Various Artists (1)
- The Visitors – ABBA (3)

== Top 40 Chart hit singles ==
Song title	Artist(s)	Release date(s)	US	UK	Highest chart position	Other Chart Performance(s)
"'65 Love Affair"	Paul Davis	December 1981	6	n/a	6 (United States)	See chart performance entry
"9 to 5 (Morning Train)"	Sheena Easton	February 1981	1	3	1 (4 countries)	See chart performance entry
"Abacab"	Genesis	August 1981	26	9	3 (South Africa)	See chart performance entry
"Absolute Beginners"	The Jam	October 1981	n/a	4	4 (United Kingdom)	35 (New Zealand)
"America"	Neil Diamond	April 1981	8	n/a	8 (United Kingdom)	1 (U.S. Billboard Adult Contemporary) - 10 (U.S. Cash Box Top 100) - 15 (Canada RPM Adult Contemporary) - 45 (Canada RPM Top Singles)
"Angel of the Morning"	Juice Newton	February 1981	4	43	1 (Canada)	See chart performance entry
"Antmusic"	Adam & the Ants	January 1981	n/a	2	1 (Australia)	See chart performance entry
"Arc of a Diver"	Steve Winwood	April 1981	48	n/a	19 (Canada)	11 (US Billboard Rock Albums & Top Tracks)
"Atlanta Lady (Something About Your Love)"	Marty Balin	August 1981	27	n/a	n/a	11 (US Billboard Adult Contemporary)
"Backfired"	Debbie Harry	July 1981	43	32	16 (Sweden)	See chart performance entry
"Being With You"	Smokey Robinson	January 1981	2	1	1 (New Zealand, United Kingdom)	See chart performance entry
"Bette Davis Eyes"	Kim Carnes	March 1981	1	10	1 (9 countries)	See chart performance entry
"Blessed Are the Believers"	Anne Murray	March 1981	34	n/a	13 (Canada)	1 (Canadian RPM Country Tracks, Canadian RPM Adult Contemporary Tracks, U.S. Billboard Hot Country Songs) - 10 (U.S. Billboard Adult Contemporary)
"The Breakup Song (They Don't Write 'Em)"	The Greg Kihn Band	March 1981	15	n/a	14 (Australia)	5 (U.S. Billboard Rock Albums & Top Tracks)
"Burnin' For You"	Blue Öyster Cult	July 1981	40	76	40 (United States)	1 (U.S. Billboard Mainstream Rock Chart) - 47 (Canada)
"Cambodia"	Kim Wilde	November 1981	n/a	12	1 (France, Sweden, Switzerland)	See chart performance entry
"Can You Feel It"	The Jacksons	February 1981	77	6	1 (Belgium, South Africa)	See chart performance entry
"Centerfold"	The J. Geils Band	September 1981	1	3	1 (Australia, Canada, United States)	See chart performance entry
"Chant No. 1 (I Don't Need This Pressure On)"	Spandau Ballet	July 1981	n/a	3	3 (United Kingdom)	See chart performance entry
"Chariots of Fire"	Vangelis	March 1981	1	12	1 (United States)	See chart performances entry
"Chequered Love"	Kim Wilde	April 1981	n/a	4	1 (South Africa)	See chart performances entry
"Controversy"	Prince	September 1981	70	n/a	1 (U.S. Billboard Hot Dance Club Songs) - 3 (U.S. Billboard Hot Soul Singles) - 15 (Australia)	28 (Netherlands [Dutch Singles Chart])
"Cool Night"	Paul Davis	October 1981	11	n/a	11 (United States)	2 (U.S. Billboard Adult Contemporary)
"Counting The Beat"	The Swingers	March 1981	n/a	n/a	1 (Australia, New Zealand)	n/a
"Crying"	Don McLean	January 1981	5	1	1 (Belgium, Netherlands [Dutch Top 40], United Kingdom	See chart performance entry
"Der Kommissar"	Falco	December 1981	n/a	n/a	1 (4 countries)	See chart performance entry
"Don't Let Him Go"	REO Speedwagon	May 1981	24	n/a	2 (Canada)	See chart performance entry
"Don't Stop Believin'"	Journey	October 1981	9	62	9 (United States)	8 (U.S. Billboard Mainstream Rock) - 9 (U.S. Billboard Adult contemporary) - 9 (Canada) - 50 (Netherlands [Single Top 100]) - 62 (United Kingdom) - 100 (Australia)
"Don't You Want Me"	The Human League	November 1981	1	1	1 (8 countries)	See chart performance entry
"Elvira"	The Oak Ridge Boys	March 1981	5	n/a	5 (United States)	See chart performance entry
"Every Little Thing She Does Is Magic"	The Police	November 1981	3	1	1 (4 countries)	See chart performance entry
"Every Woman in the World"	Air Supply	January 1981	5	n/a	3 (Canada)	2 (U.S. Billboard Adult contemporary) - 3 (U.S. Record World) - 7 (New Zealand) - 8 (Australia) - 9 (U.S. Cash Box Top 100)
"Fade to Grey"	Visage	January 1981	n/a	8	1 (Switzerland, West Germany)	See chart performance entry
"Favourite Shirts (Boy Meets Girl)"	Haircut One Hundred	October 1981	n/a	4	4 (United Kingdom)	97 (Australia)
"Fire"	U2	August 1981	n/a	35	4 (Ireland)	n/a
"Fire and Ice"	Pat Benatar	July 1981	17	n/a	3 (New Zealand)	2 (U.S. Billboard Mainstream Rock) - 4 (Canada) - 30 (Australia)
"For Your Eyes Only"	Sheena Easton	June 1981	4	8	1 (Netherlands [Dutch Top 40]/[Single Top 100], Norway, Switzerland)	See chart performance entry
"Games People Play"	Alan Parsons Project	January 1981	16	n/a	9 (Canada)	95 (Australia)
"Gemini Dream"	The Moody Blues	May 1981	12	n/a	1 (Canada)	12 (U.S. Mainstream Rock) - 13 (U.S. Cash Box Top 100) - 36 (Australia) - 36 (U.S. Billboard Hot Dance Club Songs)
"Genius of Love"	Tom Tom Club	September 1981	31	65	26 (Belgium)	1 (U.S. Billboard Hot Dance Club Songs) - 2 (U.S. Billboard Hot Soul Singles) - 28 (New Zealand)
"Girls on Film"	Duran Duran	July 1981	n/a	5	1 (Portugal)	4 (New Zealand) - 11 (Australia) - 15 (Sweden) - 16 (Ireland)
"Give It to Me Baby"	Rick James	February 1981	40	47	40 (United States)	1 (U.S. Billboard Hot Soul Singles) - 1 (U.S. Billboard Hot Dance Club Songs) - 34 (U.S. Cash Box Top 100)
"Gloria"	U2	October 1981	n/a	55	10 (Ireland)	15 (New Zealand) - 32 (Australia)
"Good Year for the Roses"	Elvis Costello and the Attractions	September 1981	n/a	6	6 (United Kingdom)	11 (Netherlands [Dutch top 40]) - 25 (Belgium) - 34 (Australia)
"Happy Birthday"	Altered Images	August 1981	n/a	2	2 (United Kingdom, South Africa)	3 (Ireland) - 16 (Sweden) - 23 (Australia) - 56 (West Germany)
"Harden My Heart"	Quarterflash	September 1981	3	49	3 (United States)	5 (Switzerland) - 6 (Australia) - 12 (New Zealand) - 15 (Austria) - 41 (U.S. Billboard Adult contemporary) - 51 (West Germany)
"Hearts"	Marty Balin	May 1981	8	n/a	4 (Canada)	9 (U.S. Billboard Adult contemporary) - 9 (U.S. Cash Box Top 100) - 11 (Canada RPM Top Singles) - 19 (France) - 20 (U.S. Billboard Top Rock Tracks)
"Hearts on Fire"	Randy Meisner	January 1981	19	n/a	19 (United States)	34 (Canada)
"Hell's Bells"	AC/DC	February 1981	n/a	n/a	7 (Australia)	16 (France) - 25 (Germany) - 50 (U.S. Billboard Mainstream Rock)
"Here I Am (Just When I Thought I Was Over You)"	Air Supply	August 1981	5	n/a	5 (United States)	1 (U.S. Billboard Adult contemporary) - 5 (Canada RPM Adult Contemporary) - 5 (U.S. Cash Box Top 100) - 43 (Australia)
"Hill Street Blues"	Mike Post	August 1981	10	n/a	10 (United States)	4 (U.S. Billboard Adult contemporary)
"History Never Repeats"	Split Enz	March 1981	n/a	63	4 (Australia)	5 (New Zealand) - 33 (U.S. Billboard Mainstream Rock)
"Hold On Tight"	Electric Light Orchestra	July 1981	10	4	1 (Spain, Switzerland)	See chart performance entry
"How 'Bout Us"	Champaign	February 1981	12	5	1 (Belgium, Netherlands [Dutch Top 40]/[Singles Top 100]	See chart performance entry
"I Ain't Gonna Stand for It"	Stevie Wonder	January 1981	11	10	2 (New Zealand)	See chart performance entry
"I Can't Go For That (No Can Do)"	Hall & Oates	November 1981	1	8	1 (United States)	See chart performance entry
"I Could Never Miss You (More Than I Do)"	Lulu	July 1981	18	62	3 (New Zealand)	10 (Canada) - 71 (Australia)
"I Don't Need You"	Kenny Rogers	June 1981	3	n/a	2 (Canada)	See chart performance entry
"I Go to Sleep"	The Pretenders	November 1981	n/a	7	4 (Netherlands [Dutch Top 40])	6 (Belgium) - 9 (Netherlands [Single Top 100] - 28 (New Zealand)
"I Love You"	Climax Blues Band	February 1981	12	n/a	14 (Canada)	9 (U.S. Cash Box Top 100) - 20 (U.S. Billboard Adult contemporary) - 30 (Canadian RPM Adult Contemporary) - 59 (Australian)
"I Made It Through the Rain"	Barry Manilow	January 1981	10	37	20 (Ireland)	4 (U.S. Billboard Adult contemporary) - 18 (U.S. Cash Box Top 100)
"I Missed Again"	Phil Collins	February 1981	19	14	6 (Canada)	See chart performance entry
"I Will Follow"	U2	August 1981*	n/a	n/a	34 (New Zealand)	20 (U.S. Billboard Top Tracks) - 71 (Australia) *song released in October 1980
"I Surrender"	Rainbow	February 1981	50	3	1 (Finland)	See chart performance entry
"I Want to Be Free"	Toyah	May 1981	n/a	8	8 (United Kingdom)	1 (UK Independent Singles Chart) - 10 (Ireland) - 10 (South Africa) - 30 (New Zealand) - 35 (Australia) - 61 (West Germany)
"I Wouldn't Have Missed It for the World"	Ronnie Milsap	October 1981	20	n/a	20	1 (U.S. Hot Country Songs, Canadian RPM Country Tracks, Canada RPM Adult Contemporary) - 3 (U.S. Billboard Adult contemporary) - 57 (Australia)
"If Leaving Me Is Easy"	Phil Collins	May 1981	n/a	17	17 (United Kingdom)	61 (Germany)
"If You Leave Me, Can I Come Too?"	Mental As Anything	May 1981	n/a	n/a	4 (Australia)	16 (New Zealand)
"I'm in Love"	Evelyn King	June 1981	40	27	27 (United Kingdom)	1 (U.S. Billboard Hot Soul Singles, U.S. Billboard Hot Dance Club Songs) - 33 (U.S. Record World) - 44 (U.S. Cash Box)
"In the Air Tonight"	Phil Collins	June 1981	19	2	(6 countries)	See chart performance entry
"In the Dark"	Billy Squier	August 1981	35	n/a	22 (Canada)	7 (U.S. Billboard Top Rock Tracks)
"Intuition"	Linx	February 1981	n/a	7	7 (United Kingdom)	10 (Ireland) - 38 (Netherlands [Single Top 100]) - 69 (Australia)
"Invisible Sun"	The Police	September 1981	n/a	2	2 (United Kingdom)	5 (Netherlands [Single Top 100]) - 89 (Australia)
"Is That Love"	Squeeze	May 1981	n/a	35	1 (Israel)	25 (Ireland)
"It Must Be Love"	Madness	November 1981	33	4	4 (United Kingdom)	5 (Ireland) - 6 (Australia) - 43 (Netherlands [Single Top 100])
"It Must Be Magic"	Teena Marie	May 1981	23	n/a	23 (United Kingdom)	2 (U.S. Billboard Hot Soul Singles)
"I've Done Everything for You"	Rick Springfield	February 1981	8	n/a	8 (United States)	19 (Canada RPM Charts) - 31 (Australia) - 40 (Canada)
"Jessie's Girl"	Rick Springfield	February 1981	1	n/a	1 (Australia, United States)	1 (U.S. Cash Box, U.S. Record World) - 6 (Canada) - 10 (U.S. Mainstream Rock) 21 (New Zealand)
"Jukebox Hero"	Foreigner	October 1981	26	48	7 (South Africa)	24 (Germany) - 34 (U.S. Cash Box Top 100) - 39 (Canada) - 53 (Australia)
"Just Between You and Me"	April Wine	February 1981	21	52	21 (United States)	22 (Canada)
"Just Can't Get Enough"	Depeche Mode	September 1981	n/a	8	4 (Australia)	1 (UK Independent Singles Chart) - 14 (Sweden) - 16 (Ireland) - 18 (Spain) - 26 (U.S. Billboard Hot Dance Club Songs) - 29 (New Zealand) - 30 (Belgium)
"Just the Two of Us"	Grover Washington, Jr.	February 1981	2	34	2 (United States)	See chart performance entry
"Kids in America"	Kim Wilde	January 1981	25	2	1 (Finland, South African)	See chart performance entry
"Kiss on My List"	Hall & Oates	January 1981	1	33	1 (United States)	7 (Canada) - 13 (Australia) - 16 (U.S. Billboard Adult contemporary) - 33 (New Zealand) - 54 (U.S. Billboard Mainstream Rock)
"Labelled with Love"	Squeeze	September 1981	n/a	4	2 (Ireland)	46 (Netherlands [Single Top 100])
"Leader of the Band"	Dan Fogelberg	November 1981	9	n/a	9 (United States)	1 (U.S. Billboard Adult contemporary) - 35 (U.S. Billboard Top Pop Singles)
"Leather and Lace"	Stevie Nicks and Don Henley	October 1981	6	n/a	6 (United States)	See chart performance entry
"Let's Get It Up"	AC/DC	December 1981	n/a	n/a	18 (Sweden)	33 (West Germany) - 73 (Australia)
"Let's Groove"	Earth, Wind & Fire	September 1981	3	3	2 (France, New Zealand)	See chart performance entry
"Limelight"	Rush	February 1981	55	n/a	18 (Canada)	4 (U.S. Billboard Mainstream Rock)
"A Little in Love"	Cliff Richard	January 1981	17	15	4 (Canada)	See chart performance entry
"Living Inside Myself"	Gino Vannelli	March 1981	6	n/a	6 (United States)	See chart performance entry
"Lock Up Your Daughters"	Slade	September 1981	n/a	29	19 (Netherlands [Dutch Singles Chart])	n/a
"Love Action (I Believe in Love)"	The Human League	July 1981	n/a	3	3 (United Kingdom)	11 (Ireland) - 12 (Australia) - 21 (New Zealand)
"Love is Alright Tonite"	Rick Springfield	August 1981	20	n/a	20 (United Kingdom)	26 (Canada RPM Top Singles) - 40 (U.S. Billboard Mainstream Rock)
"Love on a Two-Way Street"	Stacy Lattisaw	June 1981	26	n/a	26 (United States)	2 (U.S. Billboard Hot Soul Singles) - 19 (U.S. Billboard Adult Contemporary) - 23 (U.S. Cash Box Top 100) - 26 (U.S. Billboard Hot 100) - 39 (Canada)
"Message of Love"	The Pretenders	February 1981	n/a	11	9 (Ireland)	5 (U.S. Billboard Top Rock Tracks) - 15 (Australia) - 33 (Netherlands) - 44 (U.S. Billboard Dance/Disco)
"The Model"	Kraftwerk	November 1981	n/a	1	1 (United Kingdom)	4 (Ireland) - 7 (West Germany) - 20 (Finland) - 33 (Australia)
*"Modern Girl"	Sheena Easton	May 1981	18	8	8 (United Kingdom)	[[Modern Girl (Sheena Easton song)#Charts|]]
"More Than I Can Say"	Leo Sayer	January 1981	2	2	1 (Australia)	1 (U.S. Billboard Adult Contemporary) - 2 (Ireland, South Africa) - 3 (U.S. Cash Box Top 100) - 5 (New Zealand) - 7 (Canada) [1980 overlap]
"Musclebound" b/w "Glow"	Spandau Ballet	March 1981	n/a	10	10 (United Kingdom)	18 (Ireland) - 32 (Netherlands [Single Top 100)] - 97 (Australia)
"Never Too Much"	Luther Vandross	October 1981	33	13	13 (United Kingdom)	1 (U.S. Billboard Hot Soul Singles) - 4 (U.S. Billboard Dance Club Songs) - 18 (Ireland) - 47 (New Zealand)
"New Life"	Depeche Mode	June 1981	n/a	11	11 (United Kingdom)	1 (UK Independent Singles chart) - 22 (Ireland) - 29 (U.S. Billboard Dance Clubs Songs)
"O Superman"	Laurie Anderson	October 1981	n/a	2	2 (United Kingdom)	See chart performance entry
"Oh No"	The Commodores	September 1981	4	44	3 (Canada)	5 (U.S. Billboard Hot Soul Singles) - 5 (U.S. Billboard Adult Contemporary) - 51 (Australia)
"Once in a Lifetime"	Talking Heads	January 1981	n/a	14	14 (United Kingdom)	16 (Ireland) - 23 (Australia) - 24 (Netherlands [Dutch Singles Chart]) - 28 (Canada) - 103 (U.S. Billboard Bubbling Under the Hot 100)
"One in Ten"	UB40	August 1981	n/a	7	7 United Kingdom)	87 Australia)
"One of Us"	ABBA	December 1981	n/a	3	1 (6 countries)	See chart performance entry
"Open Your Heart"	The Human League	October 1981	n/a	6	6 (United Kingdom)	8 (Ireland) - 12 (Belgium) - 20 (Netherlands [Single Top 100)] - 43 (New Zealand)
"Our Lips Are Sealed"	The Go-Go's	June 1981	20	47	2 (Australia)	See chart performance entry
"Ooa hela natten"	Attack	1981	n/a	n/a	1 (Sweden)	2 (Norway)
"Pac-Man Fever"	Buckner & Garcia	December 1981	9	n/a	9 (Canada, United States)	7 (U.S. Cash Box Top 100)
"Physical"	Olivia Newton-John	September 1981	1	7	1 (Australia, Belgium, Canada, New Zealand)	See chart performance entry
"Planet Earth"	Duran Duran	February 1981	n/a	12	8 (Australia)	1 (French Airplay Chart) - 14 (Ireland) - 70 (France)
"Queen of Hearts"	Juice Newton	June 1981	2	n/a	2 (South Africa, United States)	See chart performance entry
"Rapture"	Blondie	January 1981	1	5	1 (United States)	See chart performance entry
"The River"	Bruce Springsteen	May 1981	n/a	n/a	5 (Norway)	5 (Norway) – 10 (Sweden) - 24 (Ireland) – 25 (Netherlands) – 35 (UK Singles Chart)
"Rock and Roll Ain't Noise Pollution"	AC/DC	November 1980 (Charted in 1981)	n/a	15	7 (Australia)	15 (Ireland)
"Rock This Town"	Stray Cats	January 1981	9	9	3 (Belgium)	See chart performance entry
"Sat in Your Lap"	Kate Bush	June 1981	n/a	11	11 (United Kingdom)	18 (Ireland) - 25 (Italy) - 30 (Spain) - 32 (Netherlands) - 93 (Australia)
"Shake It Up"	The Cars	November 1981	4	n/a	3 (Netherlands)	See chart performance entry
"She's a Bad Mama Jama (She's Built, She's Stacked)"	Carl Carlton	August 1981	22	34	22 (United States)	2 (US Billboard Soul Singles) - 23 (US Cash Box Top 100) - 27 (New Zealand)
"Should I Do It"	The Pointer Sisters	December 1981	12	50	6 (Belgium)	See Chart performance entry
"(Si Si) Je Suis un Rock Star"	Bill Wyman	September 1981	n/a	14	5 (Australia)	6 (New Zealand) - 14 (Netherlands) - 20 (Belgium)
"Slow Hand"	The Pointer Sisters	May 1981	2	10	2 (3 countries)	See Chart performance entry
"Souvenir"	Orchestral Manoeuvres in the Dark	August 1981	n/a	3	1 (Portugal, Spain)	See Chart performance entry
"Spirits in the Material World"	The Police	December 1981	11	12	4 (France)	See Chart performance entry
"Start Me Up"	The Rolling Stones	August 1981	2	7	1 (Australia)	See Chart performance entry
"Stop Draggin' My Heart Around"	Stevie Nicks with Tom Petty and the Heartbreakers	July 1981	3	50	3 (United States)	2 (U.S. Billboard Mainstream Rock) - 4 (South Africa) - 5 (Canada) - 10 (Australia) - 11 (New Zealand) - 43 (Netherlands [Single Top 100)
"Stray Cat Strut"	Stray Cats	April 1981	3 (Charted in 1982)	11	3 (Canada, United States)	3 (US Cash Box Top 100) - 8 (Ireland) - 30 (South Africa) - 41 (US Billboard Mainstream Rock) - 78 (US Billboard Disco/Dance)
"The Stroke"	Billy Squier	May 1981	17	52	3 (Austria, United States)	See Chart performance entry
"Sukiyaki"	A Taste of Honey	March 1981	3	n/a	3 (New Zealand, United States)	See Chart performance entry
"Super Freak"	Rick James	August 1981	16	n/a	2 (Belgium, Netherlands [Dutch Top 40])	See Chart performance entry
"Sweetheart"	Franke and the Knockouts	March 1981	10	n/a	10 (United States)	See Chart performance entry
"Take It on the Run"	REO Speedwagon	March 1981	5	19	2 (Canada)	See Chart performance entry
"Tempted"	Squeeze	July 1981	49	41	41 (United Kingdom)	8 (US Billboard Mainstream Rock) - 45 (Canada) - 95 (Australia)
"Theme from The Greatest American Hero (Believe It or Not)"	Joey Scarbury	May 1981	2	n/a	1 (New Zealand)	See chart performance entry
"(There's) No Gettin' Over Me"	Ronnie Milsap	June 1981	5	n/a	5 (United States)	See chart performance entry
"The Thin Wall"	Ultravox	April 1981	11	43	7 (Canada)	5 (US Billboard Mainstream Rock) - 7 (US Cash Box Top 100) - 11 (New Zealand)
"This Little Girl"	Gary U.S. Bonds	May 1981	n/a	14	14 (United Kingdom)	16 (Ireland) - 95 (Australia)
"Tom Sawyer"	Rush	August 1981	44	25	24 (Canada)	8 (US Billboard Mainstream Rock)
"Tonight I'm Yours (Don't Hurt Me)"	Rod Stewart	October 1981	20	8	2 (Canada)	See chart performance entry
"Too Much Time on My Hands"	Styx	February 1981	9	n/a	4 (Canada)	67 (Australia)
"Turn Me Loose"	Loverboy	February 1981	35	n/a	3 (Australia)	4 (South Africa) - 5 (New Zealand) - 6 (US Billboard Top Rock Tracks) - 7 (Canada)
"Turn Your Love Around"	George Benson	October 1981	5	29	5 (United States)	See chart performance entry
"Two Hearts"	Stephanie Mills & Teddy Pendergrass	January 1981	40	49	40 (United States)	3 (US Billboard Hot Soul Singles) - 46 (New Zealand) - 82 (US Billboard Disco Top 100)
"Urgent"	Foreigner	June 1981	4	54	1 (Canada, South Africa)	See chart performance entry
"Vienna"	Ultravox	January 1981	n/a	2	1 (3 countries)	See chart performance entry
"The Voice"	The Moody Blues	July 1981	15	n/a	9 (Canada)	1 (US Billboard Mainstream Rock) - 15 (US Cash Box Top 100) - 16 (US Billboard Adult Contemporary) - 46 (Netherlands) - 91 (Australia)
"The Waiting"	Tom Petty and the Heartbreakers	April 1981	19	n/a	6 (Canada)	1 (US Billboard Top Tracks) - 14 (US Cash Box Top 100) - 27 (New Zealand)
"Waiting for a Girl Like You"	Foreigner	October 1981	2	8	2 (Canada, United States)	See chart performance entry
"Waiting on a Friend"	The Rolling Stones	February 1981	13	50	10 (Canada)	See chart performance entry
"Walking on Thin Ice"	Yoko Ono	November 1981	58	35	6 (Sweden)	See chart performance entry
"Watching the Wheels"	John Lennon	March 1981	10	30	3 (Canada)	See chart performance entry
"We Got the Beat"	The Go-Go's	July 1981	2	n/a	2 (United States)	See chart performance entry
"Wedding Bells"	Godley & Creme	November 1981	n/a	7	7 (United Kingdom)	See chart performance entry
"While You See a Chance"	Steve Winwood	February 1981	7	45	3 (Canada)	See chart performance entry
"Who Can It Be Now?"	Men at Work	May 1981	1 (Charted in 1982)	45	1 (Israel, United States)	See chart performance entry
"Who's Crying Now"	Journey	July 1981	4	46	4 (United States)	See chart performance entry
"Why Do Fools Fall in Love"	Diana Ross	September 1981	7	4	1 (Belgium, Netherlands)	See chart performance entry
"Wired for Sound"	Cliff Richard	August 1981	71	4	2 (Australia, South Africa)	See chart performance entry
"Working for the Weekend"	Loverboy	September 1981	29	n/a	10 (Canada)	2 (US Billboard Rock Top Tracks) - 19 (Australia) - 19 (New Zealand)
"Working in the Coal Mine"	Devo	August 1981	43	n/a	10 (New Zealand)	17 (Canada) - 20 (Australia) - 30 (US Billboard Hot Dance Club Play) - 36 (US Cash Box Top 100) - 53 (US Billboard Mainstream Rock Tracks)
"You Better You Bet"	The Who	February 1981	18	9	4 (Canada)	See chart performance entry
"You Make My Dreams"	Hall & Oates	April 1981	5	n/a	5 (United States)	4 (US Radio & Records Chart) - 7 (US Cash Box Top 100) - 17 (Canada) - 35 (US Billboard Mainstream Rock) - 40 (Australia)
"Young Turks"	Rod Stewart	October 1981	5	11	1 (Canada, Israel)	See chart performance entry

== Number One hit singles ==
Song title	Artist(s)	Release date(s)	Date reached number one	Weeks at number one	Country(s)
"(Out Here) On My Own"	Nikka Costa	April 1981	August 1981	14 weeks	Italy
"Nine to Five (Morning Train)"	Sheena Easton	May 1980	May 1981	2 weeks	4 countries
"Amoureux solitaires"	Lio	September 1980	January 1981	6 weeks	France, Italy
"Angel of the Morning"	Juice Newton	February 1981	May 1981	3 weeks	Canada
"Antmusic"	Adam and the Ants	November 1980	March 1981	5 weeks	Australia
"Atmosphere"	Joy Division	March 1980	January 1981	1 week	New Zealand
"Bad Habits"	Billy Field	May 1981	October 1981	1 week	New Zealand
"Begin the Beguine"	Julio Iglesias	1981	November 1981	3 weeks	Ireland, United Kingdom
"Being with You"	Smokey Robinson	February 1981	April 1981	6 weeks	New Zealand, United Kingdom
"Bensonhurst Blues"	Oscar Benton	1981	December 1981	1 week	France
"Bette Davis Eyes"	Kim Carnes	March 1981	June 1981	5 weeks	14 countries
"Celebration"	Kool & the Gang	September 1980	May 1981	5 weeks	Canada, New Zealand, United States
"Chi Mai"	Ennio Morricone	1981	November 1981	3 weeks	France
"Cicale/Mr. pulce"	Heather Parisi	September 1981	December 1981	4 weeks	Italy
"Confidence pour confidence"	Jean Schultheis	1981	October 1981	4 weeks	France
"Counting the Beat"	The Swingers	March 1981	May 1981	1 week	Australia, New Zealand
"DEV-O Live"	Devo	March 1981	August 1981	3 weeks	Australia
"Don't You Want Me"	The Human League	November 1981	December 1981	1 week	8 countries
"Duncan"	Slim Dusty	November 1980	February 1981	2 weeks	Australia
"Endless Love"	Diana Ross & Lionel Richie	June 1981	September 1981	5 weeks	4 countries
"Enola Gay"	Orchestral Manoeuvres in the Dark	September 1980	July 1981	6 weeks	Italy, Portugal, Spain
"Every Little Thing She Does Is Magic"	The Police	October 1981	November 1981	1 week	4 countries
"Gemini Dream"	The Moody Blues	May 1981	August 1981	1 week	Canada
"Ghost Town"	The Specials	June 1981	July 1981	3 weeks	United Kingdom
"Green Door"	Shakin' Stevens	August 1981	August 1981	4 weeks	Denmark, Ireland, United Kingdom
"Hands Up (Give Me Your Heart)"	Ottawan	1981	October 1981	2 weeks	5 countries
"Imagine"	John Lennon	October 1975	January 1981	1 week	Ireland, Luxembourg, United Kingdom
"It's My Party"	Dave Stewart & Barbara Gaskin	September 1981	October 1981	4 weeks	Ireland, New Zealand, United Kingdom
"Japanese Boy"	Aneka	August 1981	September 1981	1 week	6 countries
"Je chante avec toi, liberté"	Nana Mouskouri	1981	December 1981	1 week	France
"Jealous Guy"	Roxy Music	March 1981	April 1981	4 weeks	Australia, Luxembourg, United Kingdom
"Jessie's Girl"	Rick Springfield	February 1981	August 1981	1 week	Australia, United States
"La danse des canards"	J. J. Lionel	1981	October 1981	1 week	France
"Lady (You Bring Me Up)"	Commodores	July 1981	September 1981	3 weeks	New Zealand
"Lança Perfume"	Rita Lee	September 1980	September 1981	1 week	France
"Love Will Tear Us Apart"	Joy Division	June 1980	August 1981	2 weeks	New Zealand
"Making Your Mind Up"	Bucks Fizz	March 1981	April 1981	2 weeks	7 countries
"Maledetta primavera"	Loretta Goggi	February 1981	March 1981	1 week	Italy
"More and More"	Joe Dolan	1981	March 1981	1 week	Ireland, South Africa
"One Day in Your Life"	Michael Jackson	February 1981	July 1981	2 weeks	5 countries
"One of Us"	ABBA	December 1981	December 1981	1 week	Chart performance
"Physical"	Olivia Newton-John	September 1981	November 1981	6 weeks	Chart performance
"Pour le plaisir"	Herbert Léonard	1981	May 1981	6 weeks	Chart performance
"Prince Charming"	Adam and the Ants	September 1981	September 1981	2 weeks	Chart performance
"Reality"	Richard Sanderson	1980	January 1981	8 weeks	Chart performance
"Sarà perché ti amo"	Ricchi e Poveri	February 1981	March 1981	10 weeks	Chart performance
"Sausalito Summernight"	Diesel	1981	September 1981	1 week	Chart performance
"Say I Love You"	Renée Geyer	May 1981	October 1981	2 weeks	Chart performance
"See Me Go"	Screaming Meemees	September 1981	October 1981	2 weeks	Chart performance
"Shaddap You Face"	Joe Dolce Music Theatre	November 1980	March 1981	8 weeks	Chart performance
"Stand and Deliver"	Adam and the Ants	April 1981	May 1981	5 weeks	Chart performance
"Stars on 45"	Stars on 45	January 1981	May 1981	4 weeks	Chart performance
"Start Me Up"	The Rolling Stones	August 1981	October 1981	1 week	Chart performance
"Stop the Cavalry"	Jona Lewie	November 1980	March 1981	6 weeks	Chart performance
"Tainted Love"	Soft Cell	July 1981	August 1981	2 weeks	Chart performance
"The Best of Times"	Styx	January 1981	March 1981	1 week	Chart performance
"The Bridge"	Deane Waretini	April 1981	June 1981	6 weeks	Chart performance
"The Friends of Mr. Cairo"	Jon and Vangelis	May 1981	November 1981	5 weeks	Chart performance
"The Streets of New York"	Wolfe Tones	1981	July 1981	3 weeks	Chart performance
"The Tide Is High"	Blondie	October 1980	January 1981	4 weeks	Chart performance
"Theme from The Greatest American Hero (Believe It or Not)"	Joey Scarbury	May 1981	September 1981	2 weeks	Chart performance
"There's No-one Quite Like Grandma"	St Winifred's School Choir	November 1980	January 1981	1 week	Chart performance
"This Ole House"	Shakin' Stevens	February 1981	June 1981	1 week	Chart performance
"Under Pressure"	Queen & David Bowie	October 1981	November 1981	2 weeks	Chart performance
"Urgent"	Foreigner	June 1981	September 1981	2 weeks	Chart performance
"Vertige de l'amour"	Alain Bashung	1981	April 1981	1 week	Chart performance
"Vienna"	Ultravox	January 1981	March 1981	1 week	Chart performance
"When You Were Sweet Sixteen"	The Fureys and Davy Arthur	1981	July 1981	1 week	Chart performance
"Woman"	John Lennon	January 1981	June 1981	3 weeks	Chart performance
"Woman in Love"	Barbra Streisand	August 1980	February 1981	3 weeks	Chart performance
"You Drive Me Crazy"	Shakin' Stevens	April 1981	September 1981	3 weeks	Chart performance
"You Weren't in Love with Me"	Billy Field	July 1981	November 1981	1 week	Chart performance

=== Other Chart hit singles ===
- "Aie a Mwana" – Bananarama
- "And the Bands Played On" – Saxon (# 12 UK)
- "Another Tricky Day" – The Who
- "Ay Ay Ay Ay Moosey" – Modern Romance (# 10 UK)
- "Boys and Girls" – The Human League (# 48 UK)
- "Boys in Town" – Divinyls (# 8 Australia)
- "Bringing on the Heartbreak" – Def Leppard (# 61 US)
- "Chcem sa s tebou deliť" – Marika Gombitová (Winner of the Intervision Song Contest)
- "Computer Love" – Kraftwerk (# 36 UK)
- "Cool World" – Mondo Rock (# 8 Australia)
- "Der blaue Planet" - Karat (# 2 East Germany)
- "Don't Stop the Music" – Yarbrough and Peoples
- "Double Dutch Bus" – Frankie Smith (# 7 NL)
- "Eisbär" – Grauzone (# 6 Austria)
- "Fight the Good Fight" – Triumph (# 18 U.S. Billboard Mainstream Rock)
- "Funeral Pyre" – The Jam (# 4 UK)
- "Heading Out to the Highway" – Judas Priest (# 10 U.S. Mainstream Rock)
- "I Don't Wanna Dance" – Split Enz (# 65 Australia)
- "I Heard It Through The Grapevine" - Roger (# 79 United States, # 1 U.S. Billboard Hot Soul Singles, # 25 U.S. Billboard Hot Dance Club Songs)
- "(Kom så ska vi) Leva livet" – Gyllene Tider (# 13 Sweden)
- "La voix du bon Dieu" – Céline Dion (# 11 Quebec)*"Lonely Is the Night"
- "Mean Street" – Van Halen (# 12 U.S. Billboard Mainstream Rock Tracks)
- "Pearl Necklace" – ZZ Top (# 28 US)
- "Red Barchetta" – Rush
- "Résiste" – France Gall
- "Romeo and Juliet" – Dire Straits
- "Runaround Sue" – Racey
- "Sailing" – Christopher Cross
- "Same Old Lang Syne" – Dan Fogelberg
- "Sausalito Summernight" – Diesel
- "Say Goodbye to Hollywood" – Billy Joel
- "Scary Monsters (and Super Creeps)" – David Bowie
- "She's a Bad Mama Jama (She's Built, She's Stacked)" – Carl Carlton
- "She's Got a Way" (live) – Billy Joel
- "Shout and Deliver" – The Reels (# 43 Australia)
- "Shut Up" – Madness
- "Silly" – Deniece Williams
- "Since You're Gone" – The Cars
- "Slave" – The Rolling Stones
- "So This Is Love?" – Van Halen
- "The Sound of the Crowd" – The Human League
- "Stay Young" – INXS (# 21 Australia)
- "Stone in Love" – Journey
- "Stop This Game" – Cheap Trick
- "Straight from the Heart" – The Allman Brothers Band
- "Take It to the Limit (Live)" – The Eagles
- "Telstar" – The Shadows
- "That Old Song" – Ray Parker Jr. & Raydio
- "That's Entertainment" – The Jam
- "There's a Guy Works Down the Chip Shop Swears He's Elvis" – Kirsty McColl
- "Through the Years" – Kenny Rogers
- "Time" – The Alan Parsons Project
- "Together" – Tierra
- "Too Many Times" – Mental As Anything
- "Treat Me Right" – Pat Benatar
- "Tube Snake Boogie" – ZZ Top
- "Tunnel of Love" – Dire Straits
- "Turning Japanese" – The Vapors (released in 1980)
- "Unchained" – Van Halen
- "The Unguarded Moment" – The Church
- "The Voice" – Ultravox
- "Little T&A" – The Rolling Stones
- "The Wanderer" – Donna Summer
- "Water on Glass"/"Boys" – Kim Wilde
- "We Don't Have to Hold Out" – Anne Murray
- "(We Don't Need This) Fascist Groove Thang" – Heaven 17
- "Wedding Bells" – Godley & Creme
- "We'll Bring the House Down" – Slade (# 10 UK)
- "We're in This Love Together" – Al Jarreau
- "What Are We Doin' In Love" – Kenny Rogers and Dottie West
- "What Kind of Fool" – Barbra Streisand and Barry Gibb
- "When She Was My Girl" – The Four Tops
- "When You Were Sweet Sixteen" – The Fureys with Davey Arthur
- "Whip It" – Devo
- "Wild is the Wind" – David Bowie
- "Will You?" – Hazel O'Connor
- "Winning" – Santana
- "You Got Nothing I Want" – Cold Chisel

== Notable singles ==
Song title	Artist(s)	Release date(s)	Other Chart Performance(s)
"Baila comigo"	Rita Lee	September 1980	4 (Argentina Singles Sales Chart) - 7 (Spain)
"Ceremony"	New Order	January 1981	7 (New Zealand) - 1 (UK Independent Singles Chart) - 62 (US Billboard Hot Dance Club Party)
"Christmas Wrapping"	The Waitresses	November 1981	See chart entry performance
"Closer to the Heart" (live)	Rush	November 1981	21 (U.S. Billboard Mainstream Rock) - 69 (U.S. Billboard Hot 100)
"God morgon"	Chips	1981	2nd at the Swedish Melodifestivalen 1981
"I've Seen That Face Before (Libertango)"	Grace Jones	May 1981	See chart performance entry
"Johnny Blue"	Lena Valaitis	1981	Winner of the German national final of the Eurovision Song Contest 1981
"Kick in the Eye"	Bauhaus	March 1981	29 (US Billboard Dance Club Songs) - 59 (UK Singles Chart)
"O Superman"	Laurie Anderson	October 1981	See chart performance entry
"Procession/Everything's Gone Green"	New Order	September 1981	1 (UK Independent Charts) - 38 (UK Singles Chart)
"Pull Up to the Bumper"	Grace Jones	June 1981	See chart performance entry
"Release the Bats"	The Birthday Party	July 1981	3 (UK Indie Charts)
"Walking in the Rain"	Grace Jones	October 1981	34 (New Zealand) - 67 (West Germany) - 94 (Australia)
"Walking on Thin Ice"	Yoko Ono	February 1981	See chart performance entry
"Wordy Rappinghood"	Tom Tom Club	June 1981	See chart performance entry

=== Other Notable singles ===
- "A.D. 1928/Rockin' the Paradise" – Styx
- "Alone with You" – Sunnyboys
- "Black Limousine" – The Rolling Stones
- "Happy Man" – Sunnyboys
- "Henry Hudson" – Nico
- "Is You Is Or Is You Ain't My Baby" – Joe Jackson
- "It's a Tough Life" – Pat Benatar
- "Maljčiki" – Idoli
- "Nick The Stripper" - The Birthday Party
- "No Word From China" – Pel Mel
- "No.3" – The Reels
- "October" – U2
- "Photographic"- Depeche Mode
- "Quasimodo's Dream" – The Reels
- "Radio Free Europe" (original Hib-Tone version) – R.E.M.
- "Rawhide" – Dead Kennedys
- "Thirsty and Miserable" b/w "Life of Pain" - Black Flag
- "We're Going to Live For a Very Long Time" – Heaven 17
- "We've Got a Bigger Problem Now" – Dead Kennedys

== Published popular music ==
- "9 To 5" w.m. Dolly Parton from the film Nine to Five
- "All Those Years Ago" w.m. George Harrison
- "Allentown" w.m. Billy Joel
- "Allergies" w.m. Paul Simon
- "America" w.m. Neil Diamond from the film The Jazz Singer
- "And I Am Telling You I'm Not Going" w. Tom Eyen m. Henry Krieger from the musical Dreamgirls
- "Arthur's Theme" w.m. Carole Bayer Sager, Burt Bacharach, Christopher Cross & Peter Allen from the film Arthur
- "At This Moment" w.m. Billy Vera
- "Baby, Come To Me" w.m. Rod Temperton
- "Being With You" w.m. William "Smokey" Robinson
- "Believe it or Not (Theme From The Greatest American Hero)" w. Stephen Geyer m. Mike Post
- "The Best of Times" w.m. Dennis DeYoung
- "Bette Davis Eyes" w. Donna Weiss m. Jackie DeShannon
- "Black Limousine" w.m. Mick Jagger, Keith Richards and Ronnie Wood
- "Bruce" w.m. Rick Springfield
- "Chariots of Fire" w. Jon Anderson m. Vangelis
- "Dynasty theme song" m. Bill Conti
- "The First Time it Happens" w.m. Joe Raposo, from the film The Great Muppet Caper
- "Good Thing Going (Going Gone)" w.m. Stephen Sondheim
- "Hill Street Blues theme song" m. Mike Post
- "Key Largo" w.m. Bertie Higgins & Sonny Limbo
- "Memory w. Trevor Nunn & T. S. Eliot m. Andrew Lloyd Webber. Introduced by Elaine Paige in the musical Cats.
- "One of the Girls" w. Fred Ebb m. John Kander introduced by Lauren Bacall in the musical Woman of the Year

== Classical music ==
- Milton Babbitt
  - Don, for piano four-hands
  - Ars Combinatoria, for small orchestra
- Leonard Bernstein
  - Olympic Hymn, chorus and orchestra
- Rob du Bois
  - String Quartet no. 3
  - Sonata for solo viola
- George Crumb – Gnomic Variations for piano
- Peter Maxwell Davies – Piano Sonata
- Joël-François Durand – String Trio
- Morton Feldman
  - Bass Clarinet and Percussion, for bass clarinet, cymbals and gongs
  - Triadic Memories, for piano
  - For Aaron Copland, for violin
- Lorenzo Ferrero
  - Balletto
  - Arioso II
  - Variazioni sulla notte, for guitar
- Cristóbal Halffter
  - Fantasia sobre una sonoridad de G. F. Haendel, for string orchestra
  - Ricercare, for organ
- Bengt Hambraeus – Voluntary on a Swedish Hymn Tune from Dalecarlia
- Wojciech Kilar – Exodus, a vocal-symphonic poem for mixed choir and orchestra
- George Lloyd – Tenth Symphony (for brass)
- Tome Mančev
  - Symphonic Poem, for large orchestra, Op. 16
  - Dance, for piano and percussion, Op. 19
  - The Year 1014, for mixed chorus, Op. 20
  - March of the Bicyclists, for children's chorus
- Miroslav Miletić
  - Sonatina for violin and guitar
  - Sonata for viola and piano
  - Three Popular Songs from Dalmatia for voice and guitar
- Steve Reich – Tehillim
- Roger Sessions – Concerto for Orchestra (recorded by Seiji Ozawa and the Boston Symphony Orchestra, and for which the composer receives the Pulitzer Prize for Music)
- Robert Simpson
  - Quintet for clarinet and strings
  - Symphony No. 8
- Stanislaw Skrowaczewski – Clarinet Concerto
- Alfred Schnittke
  - Symphony No. 3
  - Minnesang, for 52 voices
  - String Quartet No. 2
- Karlheinz Stockhausen
  - Klavierstück XIII
  - Traum-Formel, for basset horn

== Opera ==
- Lorenzo Ferrero – La figlia del mago
- Conrad Susa and Richard Street – Black River
- Karlheinz Stockhausen – Donnerstag aus Licht (March 15, La Scala, Milan, but without act 3, due to a choir strike; first full performance on April 3)

== Musical theater ==
- Barnum – London production opened at the London Palladium on June 11 and ran for 655 performances
- Bring Back Birdie – Broadway production
- Cats (Andrew Lloyd Webber) – London production opened at the New London Theatre on May 11 and ran for 8949 performances
- Dreamgirls – Broadway production opened on December 20 at the Imperial Theatre and ran for 1522 performances
- March of the Falsettoes – off-Broadway production
- Merrily We Roll Along – Broadway production opened at the Alvin Theatre on November 16 and ran for 16 performances
- The Pirates of Penzance – Broadway revival
- Song and Dance – London production
- Woman of the Year – Broadway production opened at the Palace Theatre on March 29 and ran for 770 performances

== Musical films ==
- Aakkramanam
- American Pop
- The Great Muppet Caper
- Heavy Metal
- Lili Marleen
- Nandu
- Pennies from Heaven
- Shock Treatment

== Births ==
- January 2 - JT Daly, American indie rock musician, producer, songwriter, and visual artist (K Flay, Demi Lovato)
- January 3 – Sun Park, South Korean-Australian actress and singer (Hi-5)
- January 4 – Silvy De Bie, Belgian singer
- January 5 – Carmen Monarcha, Brazilian operatic soprano
- January 7 – Ania, Polish singer-songwriter and composer
- January 9 – Dean Saunders, Dutch singer
- January 10 – Brian Joo, American-South Korean singer, songwriter, actor, and television host (Fly To The Sky)
- January 11 – Jamelia, English-Jamaican R&B singer and actress
- January 14 – Rosa López, Spanish singer
- January 15
  - Howie Day, American singer-songwriter
  - Pitbull, Cuban-American rapper
- January 16
  - Marta Roure, Andorran singer and actress
  - Mỹ Tâm, Vietnamese singer and songwriter
- January 17 – Ray J, American rapper
- January 19 – Thaila Zucchi, British singer and actress (allSTARS*)
- January 21
  - Andy Lee, South Korean singer and actor (Shinhwa)
  - Floor Jansen, Dutch singer, songwriter, and vocal coach.
  - Jung Ryeo-won, Australian-South Korean singer (Chakra)
- January 22 – Willa Ford, American pop singer-songwriter, model, musician and actress
- January 25 – Alicia Keys, American singer-songwriter, record producer, pianist, actress and activist
- January 26 – Gustavo Dudamel, Venezuelan conductor
- January 28 – Gen Hoshino, Japanese singer
- January 29 – Jonny Lang, American blues artist
- January 31 – Justin Timberlake, American singer (NSYNC), collaborator with Britney Spears (Married to Jessica Biel, Worked with JC Chasez)
- February 1 – Jay R Sillona, Filipino singer
- February 3 - Micah P. Hinson an American Americana singer and guitarist and recording artist
- February 5 – Zameer Rizvi, Canadian singer/songwriter, composer and record producer
- February 9
  - Tom Hiddleston, English actor, film producer and musician (Taylor Swift)
  - The Rev, American musician (Avenged Sevenfold) (d. 2009)
- February 10 – Natasha St-Pier, Canadian singer
- February 11 – Kelly Rowland American singer-songwriter, member of Destiny's Child
- February 12 – Lisa Hannigan, Irish singer-songwriter, musician and voice actress.
- February 15
  - Matt Hoopes, musician, guitarist and singer-songwriter, (Relient K)
  - Olivia, American singer-songwriter and actress
- February 18 – Kamasi Washington, American crossover jazz saxophonist
- February 19 – Beth Ditto, American singer-songwriter, author, entrepreneur (Gossip)
- February 26 – Sharon Van Etten, American singer-songwriter and actress
- February 27 – Josh Groban, American crossover singer-songwriter
- March 3
  - Tobias Forge, Swedish musician
  - Shatha Hassoun, Iraqi singer
  - Cristina Scarlat, Moldovan singer
- March 7 – Anna Leese, New Zealand operatic soprano
- March 9 – Chad Gilbert, American musician, singer-songwriter (New Found Glory)
- March 11
  - Russell Lissack (Bloc Party)
  - LeToya Luckett (Destiny's Child)
- March 14 - Katarína Knechtová, Slovak singer-songwriter and guitarist
- March 16 - Danny Brown, American rapper, singer and songwriter
- March 18 – Jang Na-ra, South Korean actress and singer
- March 26
  - Anaïs Mitchell, American singer-songwriter, producer and musician (Rachel Ries, Jefferson Hamer, Ani DiFranco, Justin Vernon, Greg Brown and Ben Knox Miller)
  - Jay Sean, British singer-songwriter
- March 27 – JJ Lin, Singaporean singer
- March 29 – Megan Hilty, American singer
- April 1
  - Theresa Sokyrka, Canadian Idol 2 runner-up
  - Hannah Spearritt, English singer and actress (S Club 7)
- April 2 – Raghav, Canadian singer
- April 5 – Mariqueen Maandig, Filipino-American musician and singer-songwriter (How To Destroy Angels, West Indian Girl, Trent Reznor)
- April 6 – Aidonia, Jamaican dancehall artist
- April 8 – Gummy, Korean singer
- April 10 – Laura Bell Bundy, American actress and singer
- April 12 – Fahad Al Kubaisi, Qatari singer and activist
- April 16 – Loulou Lamotte, Swedish singer-songwriter (The Mamas)
- April 17 – Hanna Pakarinen, Finnish singer
- April 21 – Mike Christie, English singer-songwriter, composer and baritone (G4)
- April 26 – Ms. Dynamite, English rapper and singer
- April 27
  - Sandy Mölling, German pop singer
  - Fabrizio Faniello, Maltese pop singer
- April 28 – Jessica Alba, American actress and businesswoman
- April 29 – Tom Smith (Editors)
- April 30 – Justin Vernon, American multi-instrumentalist, singer-songwriter and producer (Bon Iver, Taylor Swift's Folklore and Evermore)
- May 3
  - Farrah Franklin, American singer-songwriter, actress (Destiny's Child)
  - Father John Misty, American singer-songwriter, guitarist, drummer and record producer
- May 4 – Dallon Weekes, American singer, songwriter, musician and producer (Of Bands: Panic! At The Disco, & I Dont Know How but They Found Me)
- May 5
  - Jesse Colburn, Canadian guitarist and songwriter
  - Craig David, British singer-songwriter, rapper and record producer
- May 12 – Hannah Ild, Estonian singer-songwriter and pianist
- May 13 - Mozella, American songwriter and singer
- May 16 - Brooke McClymont, Australian singer-songwriter, musician and guitarist (sister of Samantha McClymont)
- May 19 - Yo Gotti, American rapper
- May 20
  - Sean Conlon, English pop singer (5ive)
  - Rachel Platten, American singer-songwriter
- May 21 – Stig van Eijk, singer, composer and lyricist
- May 23
  - Dessa, American rapper, singer, spoken word artist, writer and record executive
  - Pierre Lapointe, Canadian singer-songwriter and keyboard player
  - Gwenno Saunders, Welsh singer and dancer (The Pipettes)
- May 25 - Autumn Rowe, American singer-songwriter, TV personality, DJ and activist
- May 28 - Victoria Legrand, French-American musician (Beach House)
- May 30 – Devendra Banhart, Venezuelan American singer-songwriter and visual artist
- June 1 – Brandi Carlile, American folk rock and Americana singer-songwriter
- June 2
  - Brandon Jenner, indie pop musician (Brandon & Leah)
  - Catherine Manoukian, Canadian violinist
- June 7 – Dave Catching, American guitarist, songwriter and producer (Earthlings? and Mondo Generator)
- June 8 – Alex Band, American rock singer-songwriter (The Calling)
- June 9 – Anoushka Shankar, British Indian sitar player
- June 10 – Hoku Ho, Hawaiian singer and musician
- June 15 – Billy Martin (guitarist), American guitarist
- June 17 – Ken the 390, Japanese rapper
- June 20 – Alisan Porter, American singer, winner of season 10 of The Voice (US)
- June 21 – Brandon Flowers, American singer-songwriter, musician, Multi-instrumentalist, advocate, member of (The Killers)
- June 23
  - Mikey Bustos, Filipino-Canadian singer and entertainer
  - Antony Costa (Blue)
  - Shi Xin Hui, Malaysian singer
- June 28
  - Michael Crafter, Australian singer-songwriter (Confession, I Killed the Prom Queen, Carpathian and Bury Your Dead)
  - Savage (AKA Demetrius Savelio) New Zealand born Samoan rapper
- July 1 – Clemency Burton-Hill, English classical music broadcast presenter
- July 3 – Hayley Holt, New Zealand snowboarder, host and ballroom dancer
- July 6 – Emily West, American singer-songwriter and guitarist
- July 7
  - Synyster Gates, American musician (Avenged Sevenfold)
  - Omar Naber, Slovenian singer, songwriter and musician
- July 8
  - Oka Antara, Indonesian rapper and actor
  - Dagmar Oja, Estonian singer
- July 12
  - Rebecca Hunter, English pop singer (allSTARS*) and actress
  - Maya Sar, Bosnian singer
- July 14 – Milow, Belgian singer-songwriter
- July 15 – OC Ukeje, Nigerian actor, model and musician
- July 19 – Zolani Mahola, South African singer-songwriter and actress (Freshlyground)
- July 20
  - Lowkey, American rapper and producer
  - Dayang Nurfaizah, Malaysian singer
- July 21
  - Paloma Faith, English singer-songwriter
  - Blake Lewis, American Idol 6 runner-up
  - Claudette Ortiz, American singer and model (City High)
- July 22 – Anthony Santos, American singer-songwriter and composer
- July 25 – Kizito Mihigo, Rwandan gospel singer, organist and peace activist (d. 2020)
- July 31
  - Mesut Kurtis, British Turkish Islamic singer
  - Ira Losco, Maltese singer
  - M. Shadows, American singer-songwriter and musician (Avenged Sevenfold)
- August 1 – Vaiko Eplik, Estonian singer-songwriter
- August 4 – Florian Silbereisen, German singer and television presenter
- August 5 – Ko Shibasaki, Japanese singer and actress
- August 6 – Leslie Odom Jr., American singer and actor
- August 8
  - Vanessa Amorosi, Australian singer-songwriter, musician, guitarist and rock star (Dave Stewart)
  - Bradley McIntosh, English pop singer (S Club 7)
  - Kaori Iida, Japanese singer and actress
- August 10 – Natsumi Abe, Japanese singer (Morning Musume)
- August 11
  - Sandi Thom, Scottish singer-songwriter and multi-instrumentalist
  - Fiona Sit, Hong Kong singer and actress
- August 24 – Jiro Wang, Taiwanese actor and singer (Fahrenheit)
- August 28 – Iracema Trevisan (Cansei de Ser Sexy)
- September 4
  - Beyoncé, American singer-songwriter, dancer and actress
  - Lacey Sturm, American singer-songwriter (Flyleaf)
- September 6 – Yumiko Cheng, Hong Kong singer
- September 7 – Do, Dutch singer
- September 12 – Jennifer Hudson, American singer
- September 14 – Ashley Roberts American singer-songwriter, dancer, choreographer, actress, model, presenter and television personality (The Pussycat Dolls)
- September 16 – Nazril Irham, Indonesian singer
- September 18 – Jesse Frasure, American music publisher, record producer, songwriter and DJ
- September 20 – Keith Semple, English boy band (One True Voice)
- September 23 – Natalie Horler, German singer, songwriter and television presenter (Cascada)
- September 25
  - Perfume Genius, American indie EDM musician, singer-songwriter and artist
  - Shane Tutmarc, American producer, songwriter, singer and multi-instrumentalist. (Jessica Lea Mayfield, Tristen Gaspadarek)
- September 26
  - Christina Milian, American singer-songwriter, dancer and actress
  - Aras Baskauskas, Yogi, musician and reality TV personality, worked musically under name: Odd Us
- September 29 – Suzanne Shaw, English singer (Hear'Say) and actress
- October 5 – Breakbot, producer and DJ
- October 8 – Ruby, Egyptian singer
- October 10 – Una Healy, Irish singer (The Saturdays)
- October 13
  - Doveman, American singer, pianist and producer
  - Kele Okereke, Kele, English musician (Bloc Party)
- October 14 – Ruslan Alekhno, Russian-Belarusian singer
- October 15
  - Nick White (Tilly and the Wall)
  - Keyshia Cole, American singer, songwriter, television personality and actress
- October 19 – Christian Bautista, Filipino singer, actor, host and model
- October 29 – Angelika Dela Cruz, Filipina actress and singer
- October 31 – Frank Iero, American rock guitarist (My Chemical Romance)
- November 1
  - Tommy Karevik, Swedish metal vocalist (Kamelot, Seventh Wonder, Ayreon)
  - LaTavia Roberson, American R&B singer-songwriter (Destiny's Child)
- November 2 - Ai, a Japanese-American singer-songwriter, rapper, record producer, spokeswoman, and actress.
- November 7 – Krystal Harris, American singer-songwriter
- November 11 – Natalie Glebova, Canadian author
- November 13 – Shawn Yue, Hong Kong actor and singer
- November 16 – Kate Miller-Heidke, Australian crossover singer-songwriter and actress
- November 17 – Sarah Harding, English pop singer-songwriter, dancer, model and actress (Girls Aloud) (d. 2021)
- November 18 – Shin Ji, South Korean singer (Koyote)
- November 20
  - Scott Hutchison, Scottish singer-songwriter, guitarist and artist (d. 2018)
  - Kimberley Walsh, English pop singer-songwriter (Girls Aloud)
- November 22
  - Ben Adams, English pop singer-songwriter (A1)
  - Jenny Owen Youngs, American singer-songwriter
- November 26 – Natasha Bedingfield, English singer-songwriter
- November 30 – Mavado, Jamaican deejay and singer-songwriter
- December 2 – Britney Spears, American singer-songwriter, dancer, performer, musician, author, activist, advocate, businesswoman, and clothes designer
- December 9 – Camoflauge, American rapper (d. 2003)
- December 10 – Paula Vesala, Finnish singer-songwriter
- December 11 – Zacky Vengeance, heavy metal rhythm guitarist and backing vocalist (Avenged Sevenfold)
- December 13
  - Gary Innes, Scottish accordionist, shinty player and broadcaster
  - Amy Lee, American singer-songwriter, harpist, pianist, musician, multi instrumentalist and activist (Evanescence)
- December 16
  - Gaby Moreno, Guatemalan singer
  - Krysten Ritter, American musician and actress
- December 17
  - Wacław Kiełtyka, Polish musician and composer
  - Houari Manar, Algerian raï singer (d. 2019)
- December 21 – Lynda Thomas, Mexican musician, singer-songwriter, Eurodance and alternative rock musician
- December 23 – Beth, Spanish singer and actress
- December 28 – Frank Turner, English punk and folk singer-songwriter

== Deaths ==
- January 1 – Hephzibah Menuhin, pianist and human rights campaigner, 60
- January 4 – Ruth Lowe, pianist and songwriter, 66
- January 23 – Samuel Barber, composer, 70
- January 25 – Adele Astaire, US dancer, actress and singer, 84
- February 1
  - Frank Merrick, pianist
  - Geirr Tveitt, Norwegian composer, 72
  - Ernst Pepping, composer, 79
- February 9 – Bill Haley, rock and roll pioneer, 55 (heart attack)
- February 15
  - Mike Bloomfield, blues guitarist, 37 (accidental drug overdose)
  - Karl Richter, German organist and conductor, 54
- February 19 – Olive Gilbert, actress and singer, 82
- February 21 – Ron Grainer, electronic music pioneer and composer, 58
- February 26 – Howard Hanson, composer, 84
- April 5
  - Bob Hite, vocalist (Canned Heat), 38 (heart attack)
  - Maurice Zbriger, violinist, composer and conductor, 84
- April 7 – Kit Lambert, former manager and producer of The Who, 45 (fell downstairs)
- April 8 – Burt Shevelove, librettist, 66
- April 14 – Ivan Galamian, violin teacher, 78
- April 28 – Steve Currie, bassist of T.Rex, 33 (car crash)
- May 11 – Bob Marley, reggae musician, 36 (cancer)
- May 25 – Roy Brown, blues singer, 55
- May 28 – Mary Lou Williams, jazz pianist, 71
- July 1 – Rushton Moreve, US bass player and songwriter (Steppenwolf), 32
- July 16 – Harry Chapin, US singer-songwriter, 38 (car crash)
- July 29 – Sydney Kyte, British bandleader and violinist, 85
- August 18 – Robert Russell Bennett, composer and arranger, 87
- August 26 – Lee Hays, folk singer, 67
- September 2 – Tadeusz Baird, composer, 53
- September 8 – Master Venu, film composer, 65
- September 14 – Furry Lewis, country blues guitarist and songwriter, 88
- September 15 – Chick Bullock, US singer, 72
- September 22 – Henry Warren, film songwriter, 87
- October 2 – Hazel Scott, classical pianist and singer, 61
- October 5 – Sven Gyldmark, film composer, 77
- October 13 – Marius Casadesus, violinist and composer, 88
- October 15 – Elsie Randolph, English actress, dancer and singer, 77
- October 29 – Georges Brassens, singer-songwriter, 60
- November 27 – Lotte Lenya, actress and singer, wife of Kurt Weill, 83
- December 13 – Cornelius Cardew, avant-garde composer, 45 (road accident)
- December 27 – Hoagy Carmichael, pianist, singer and songwriter, 82

== Awards ==
=== Grammy Awards ===
- Grammy Awards of 1981

=== Country Music Association Awards ===
- 1981 Country Music Association Awards

=== Eurovision Song Contest ===
- Eurovision Song Contest 1981

=== Japan Record Awards ===
- 22nd Japan Record Awards

== Charts ==
=== List of No. 1 Hits ===
- List of Billboard Hot 100 number-one singles of 1981

== See also ==
- Timeline of musical events
