= List of RPM number-one adult contemporary singles of 1981 =

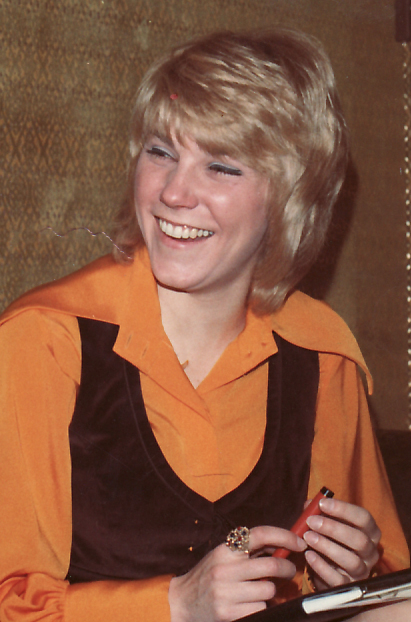
Country singer Anne Murray had two chart-topping singles in the RPM Contemporary Adult charts of 1981

In 1981, RPM magazine published a chart for top-performing singles in the adult contemporary category in Canada. The chart, entitled Adult Oriented for the June 6 issue and Contemporary Adult for the rest of the year, has undergone numerous name changes, becoming Adult Contemporary in 1984 to September 1988, and from May 1989 until the magazine's final publication in November 2000. The 1981 charts were issued between June 6 and July 4, and August 29 and December 26, with a seven-week hiatus; the chart had gone into hiatus between the November 29, 1980 and May 30, 1981 issues. Sixteen individual singles reached number one in the 1981 charts, which contains 30 positions and are based on record sales and adult contemporary radio playlist submissions.

== Chart history ==
Chart history
Issue date	Title	Artist(s)	Ref.
June 6	"Stars on 45 Medley"	Stars on 45	
June 13	"Stars on 45 Medley"	Stars on 45	
June 20	"Morning Train"	Sheena Easton	
June 27	"Bette Davis Eyes"	Kim Carnes	
July 4	"Sukiyaki"	A Taste of Honey	
August 29	"We Don't Have to Hold Out"	Anne Murray	
September 5	"We Don't Have to Hold Out"	Anne Murray	
September 12	"We Don't Have to Hold Out"	Anne Murray	
September 19	"Some Days Are Diamonds (Some Days Are Stone)"	John Denver	
September 26	"Feels So Right"	Alabama	
October 3	"Feels So Right"	Alabama	
October 10	"Endless Love"	Lionel Richie and Diana Ross	
October 17	"Endless Love"	Lionel Richie and Diana Ross	
October 24	"(There's No) Getting Over Me"	Ronnie Milsap	
October 31	"Arthur's Theme (Best That You Can Do)"	Christopher Cross	
November 7	"Hard to Say"	Dan Fogelberg	
November 14	"Who's Crying Now"	Journey	
November 21	"It's All I Can Do"	Anne Murray	
November 28	"It's All I Can Do"	Anne Murray	
December 5	"We're In This Love Together"	Al Jarreau	
December 12	"Hooked on Classics"	Royal Philharmonic Orchestra	
December 19	"Hooked on Classics"	Royal Philharmonic Orchestra	
December 26	"Comin' In and Out of Your Life"	Barbra Streisand	
