= Another Sleepless Night (Anne Murray song) =

Single by Anne Murray

from the album Where Do You Go When You Dream
- B-side: "It Should Have Been Easy"
- Released: January 1982
- Genre: Country
- Length: 3:07
- Label: Capitol
- Songwriters: Charlie Black; Rory Bourke
- Producer: Jim Ed Norman

Anne Murray singles chronology
"It's All I Can Do" (1981)	"Another Sleepless Night" (1982)	"Hey! Baby" (1982)

"Another Sleepless Night" is a song written by Charlie Black and Rory Bourke, and recorded by Canadian country music artist Anne Murray. It was released in January 1982 as the fourth single from her album Where Do You Go When You Dream. The song reached No. 1 on the RPM Country Tracks chart in Canada and #4 on the Billboard Hot Country Singles chart in the United States.

== Content ==
The song, light and uptempo, was a bit of a departure for Murray, whose previous few singles had all been slower-tempo ballads. The narrator notes how it had been hard to sleep during recent nights, as her lover had been away, but then speculates that, with his return, it will yet be "another sleepless night", but this time because they'll be up all night "making romance".

== Charts ==
=== Weekly charts ===
Chart (1982)	Peak position
Canadian RPM Country Tracks	1
Canadian RPM Adult Contemporary Tracks	1
New Zealand (Listener)	3
US Billboard Hot 100	44
US Adult Contemporary (Billboard)	11
US Hot Country Songs (Billboard)	4

=== Year-end charts ===
Chart (1982)	Position
US Hot Country Songs (Billboard)	29
