= Terry Gregory =

American country music singer-songwriter (born 1956)

- Birth name: Theresa Ann Gregory
- Born: April 30, 1956 (age 68)
- Origin: Washington, D.C.
- Genres: Country
- Occupation: Singer-songwriter
- Years active: 1981–1985
- Labels: Handshake, Scotti Brothers

Theresa Ann Gregory (born April 30, 1956 in Washington, D.C.) is an American country music singer-songwriter. Gregory's debut album, Just Like Me, was released in 1981 by Handshake Records. Its first single, the title track, reached the Top 20 on the Billboard Hot Country Singles chart.

Dave Mulholland of the Ottawa Citizen gave the album a mixed review, praising Gregory's "light, lilting voice" but criticizing the "mundane lyrics".

== Discography ==
=== Albums ===
Title	Album details	Peak positions
Title	Album details	US Country
Just Like Me	Release date: 1981; Label: Handshake Records	52
From the Heart	Release date: 1982; Label: Handshake Records	—
"—" denotes an album that did not chart.

=== Singles ===
Year	Single	Peak positions	Album
Year	Single	US Country	Album
1981	"Just Like Me"	16	Just Like Me
1981	"Cinderella"	59	Just Like Me
1981	"I Can't Say Goodbye to You"	30	Just Like Me
1982	"I Never Knew the Devil's Eyes Were Blue"	44	From the Heart
1982	"I'm Takin' a Heart Break"	48	From the Heart
1984	"Cowgirl in a Coupe DeVille"	75	non-album singles
1985	"Pardon Me, But This Heart's Taken"	66	non-album singles
