= Southern Rains =

Single by Mel Tillis

from the album Southern Rain
- B-side: "Forgive Me for Giving You Blues"
- Released: December 1980
- Genre: Country
- Length: 2:33
- Label: Elektra
- Songwriter: Roger Murrah
- Producer: Jimmy Bowen

Mel Tillis singles chronology
"Steppin' Out" (1980)	"Southern Rains" (1980)	"Million Old Goodbyes" (1981)

"Southern Rains" is a song written by Roger Murrah, and recorded by American country music artist Mel Tillis. It was released in December 1980 as the first single from the album Southern Rain. While the album title is singular, the song title is plural, and therefore not a title track. "Southern Rains" was Tillis' sixth number one on the country chart. The single stayed at number one for one week and spent a total of eleven weeks on the country chart.

== Charts ==
Chart (1980–1981)	Peak position
US Hot Country Songs (Billboard)	1
Canadian RPM Country Tracks	1
