= Where Do You Go When You Dream =

Studio album by Anne Murray
- Released: April 23, 1981
- Studios: Eastern Sound (Toronto, Canada)
- Genre: Country
- Length: 30:12
- Label: Capitol
- Producer: Jim Ed Norman

Anne Murray chronology
Anne Murray's Greatest Hits (1980)	Where Do You Go When You Dream (1981)	Christmas Wishes (1981)

Singles from Where Do You Go When You Dream
- 1. "Blessed Are the Believers" Released: March 10, 1981; 2. "We Don't Have to Hold Out" Released: June 3, 1981; 3. "It's All I Can Do" Released: September 1981; 4. "Another Sleepless Night" Released: January 1982

Where Do You Go When You Dream is the eighteenth studio album by Canadian country pop artist Anne Murray, released in 1981 via Capitol Records. It reached #4 on the U.S. country album charts, and #55 on the pop album charts. In her native Canada, it reached #7 on the album chart. It was quickly certified Gold by the RIAA.

The album's first single, "Blessed Are the Believers", was Murray's sixth #1 Country hit. It also reached #10 on the Billboard Adult Contemporary chart, and #34 on the Billboard Hot 100. "We Don't Have to Hold Out", "Another Sleepless Night" and "It's All I Can Do" were also released as follow-up singles. In the UK the first single was "Where Do You Go When You Dream" (CL 16192).

== Track listing ==
No.	Title	Writer(s)	Length
1.	"Blessed Are the Believers"	Charlie Black, Rory Bourke, Sandy Pinkard	2:39
2.	"It Should Have Been Easy"	Bob McDill	2:39
3.	"If a Heart Must Be Broken"	Craig Bickhardt	2:50
4.	"Bitter They Are, Harder They Fall"	Larry Gatlin	2:43
5.	"It's All I Can Do"	Archie Jordan, Richard Leigh	2:50
6.	"We Don't Have to Hold Out"	Aidan Mason, Gordon Adams	3:39
7.	"Another Sleepless Night"	Black, Bourke	3:08
8.	"Where Do You Go When You Dream"	Black, Molly-Ann Leikin	3:07
9.	"Call Me with the News"	Black, Kerry Chater, Bourke	2:55
10.	"Only Love"	Mason, Adams	3:42

== Personnel ==
- Anne Murray – lead vocals, backing vocals
- Brian Gatto – keyboards (1–3, 5–8), synthesizers (9, 10)
- Doug Riley – keyboards (1, 5, 6, 8)
- Pat Riccio Jr. – keyboards (2, 3, 7, 10), acoustic piano (9)
- Mike "Pepe" Frances – guitars (1, 6)
- Bob Mann – guitars (1, 5, 6, 8, 9), electric guitar solo (7)
- Brian Russell – guitars (1–3, 5–8)
- Aidan Mason – guitars (2, 3, 7, 9, 10)
- Georges Hébert – guitars (4, 7)
- Sonny Garrish – steel guitar (2, 3)
- JayDee Maness – steel guitar (3, 5, 8)
- Peter Cardinali – bass (1–3, 5–10), string arrangements and conductor (2, 3, 7)
- Barry Keane – drums (1, 5, 6, 8)
- Jørn Andersen – drums (2, 3, 7, 9, 10)
- Victor Feldman – percussion (6, 8–10)
- Gerry Niewood – saxophone solo (9)
- Rick Wilkins – string arrangements and conductor (1, 5, 6, 8)
- Bruce Murray – backing vocals
- Deborah Schaal Greimann – backing vocals

=== Production ===
- Balmur Ltd. – executive producers, management
- Jim Ed Norman – producer
- Ken Friesen – engineer
- Graham Duff – assistant engineer
- Fraser Hill – assistant engineer
- Ken Perry – mastering at Capitol Mastering (Hollywood, California, USA)
- Paul Cade – art direction, design
- Bob Karman – illustration
- Bill Langstroth – photography
- Gord Marci – photography
- Hunter Brown Ltd. – typesetting
- Leonard T. Rambeau – management

== Chart performance ==
Chart (1981)	Peak position
Canadian RPM Top Albums	7
Australia (Kent Music Report)	69
U.S. Billboard Top Country Albums	4
U.S. Billboard 200	55
