= Christmas Wishes (Anne Murray album) =

Studio album by Anne Murray
- Released: 1981
- Studios: Eastern Sound (Toronto, Ontario, Canada)
- Genre: Country
- Length: 30:58
- Label: Capitol
- Producer: Jim Ed Norman

Anne Murray chronology
Where Do You Go When You Dream (1981)	Christmas Wishes (1981)	The Hottest Night of the Year (1982)

Christmas Wishes is a seasonal studio album by Canadian country music artist Anne Murray. It was Anne's first Holiday recording, released by Capitol Records in 1981.

The disc peaked at #34 on the Billboard Top Country Albums chart. It stands as one of Anne's biggest-selling career albums, earning double platinum certification from the RIAA. At the time of its deletion, it had sold nearly 3 million US copies.

== Track listing ==
No.	Title	Writer(s)	Length
1.	"Winter Wonderland"	Felix Bernard, Richard B. Smith	2:55
2.	"Silver Bells"	Ray Evans, Jay Livingston	2:55
3.	"The Little Drummer Boy"	Katherine K. Davis, Henry Onorati, Harry Simeone	3:50
4.	"I'll Be Home for Christmas"	Kim Gannon, Walter Kent, Buck Ram	3:35
5.	"Christmas Wishes"	Art Podell, Randy Sparks	2:37
6.	"Joy to the World"	Lowell Mason, Isaac Watts	2:09
7.	"Away in a Manger"	Traditional	2:56
8.	"O Holy Night"	Adolphe Adam, John Sullivan Dwight	3:06
9.	"Go Tell It on the Mountain"	Traditional, John Wesley Work Jr.	2:48
10.	"Silent Night"	Franz Xaver Gruber, Joseph Mohr	4:07

== Personnel ==
- Anne Murray – lead vocals, additional backing vocals (3), backing vocals (10)
- Brian Gatto – electric piano
- Doug Riley – acoustic piano (1–6, 8, 9)
- Jack Lenz – acoustic piano (7, 10)
- Bob Mann – acoustic guitars
- Bob Lucier – steel guitar
- Tom Szczesniak – bass
- Barry Keane – drums
- Rick Wilkins – arrangements and conductor (1–5)
- Peter Cardinali – arrangements and conductor (6–10)
- Bill Richards – concertmaster
- Tommy Ambrose – backing vocals (1–9)
- Bob Farrar – backing vocals (1–9)
- Debbie Fleming – backing vocals (1–9)
- Bob Hamper – backing vocals (1–9)
- Laurie Hood – backing vocals (1–9)
- Vern Kennedy – backing vocals (1–9)
- Judy Marchak – backing vocals (1–9)
- Colina Phillips – backing vocals (1–9)
- Janie Ray – backing vocals (1–9)
- Debbie Greimann – additional backing vocals (3), backing vocals (10)
- Bruce Murray – backing vocals (10)

== Production ==
- Jim Ed Norman – producer
- Ken Friesen – engineer
- Tom Henderson – assistant engineer
- Ken Perry – mastering at Capitol Mastering (Hollywood, California, USA)
- Paul Cade – art direction
- Roy Kohara – art direction
- Phil Shima – design
- Tim Saunders – photography
- Morris Zaslavsky – calligraphy

== Chart performance ==
Chart (1981)	Peak position
U.S. Billboard Top Country Albums	34
U.S. Billboard Top LPs	54
U.S. Billboard Top Holiday Albums	19
Chart (1982)	Peak position
Australia (Kent Music Report)	62
