= Blessed Are the Believers =

Single by Anne Murray

from the album Where Do You Go When You Dream
- B-side: "Only Love"
- Released: March 10, 1981 (US)
- Genre: Country
- Label: Capitol
- Songwriters: Charlie Black; Rory Bourke; Sandy Pinkard
- Producer: Jim Ed Norman

Anne Murray singles chronology
"Could I Have This Dance" (1980)	"Blessed Are the Believers" (1981)	"We Don't Have to Hold Out" (1981)

"Blessed Are the Believers" is a song written by Charlie Black, Rory Bourke and Sandy Pinkard (of Pinkard & Bowden), and recorded by Canadian country music artist Anne Murray. It was released in March 1981 as the first single from Murray's Gold-certified Where Do You Go When You Dream album.

The single was Murray's sixth number one on the Country chart, where it spent one week at number one and a total of twelve weeks on the country chart. On the pop singles chart, it was her final Top 40 single to date, peaking at number thirty-four.

== Charts ==
Chart (1981)	Peak position
Canadian RPM Country Tracks	1
Canadian RPM Adult Contemporary Tracks	1
Canadian RPM Top Singles	13
US Hot Country Songs (Billboard)	1
US Adult Contemporary (Billboard)	10
US Billboard Hot 100	34
