= We Don't Have to Hold Out =

Single by Anne Murray

from the album Where Do You Go When You Dream
- B-side: "Call Me with the News"
- Released: June 3, 1981
- Genre: Country
- Label: Capitol
- Songwriter(s): Aidan Mason; Gordon Adams
- Producer(s): Jim Ed Norman

Anne Murray singles chronology
"Blessed Are the Believers" (1981)	"We Don't Have to Hold Out" (1981)	"It's All I Can Do" (1981)

"We Don't Have to Hold Out" is a song written by Aidan Mason and Gordon Adams, and recorded by Canadian country music artist Anne Murray. It was released in June 1981 as the second single from her album Where Do You Go When You Dream. The song reached number 1 on the RPM Adult Contemporary Tracks chart in August 1981.

== Chart performance ==
Chart (1981)	Peak position
Canadian RPM Country Tracks	5
Canadian RPM Adult Contemporary Tracks	1
U.S. Billboard Hot Country Singles	16
US Adult Contemporary (Billboard)	33
