= It's All I Can Do (Anne Murray song) =

Single by Anne Murray

from the album Where Do You Go When You Dream
- B-side: "If a Heart Must Be Broken"
- Released: September 1981
- Genre: Country
- Length: 2:53
- Label: Capitol Nashville
- Songwriters: Richard Leigh, Archie Jordan
- Producer: Jim Ed Norman

Anne Murray singles chronology
"We Don't Have to Hold Out" (1981)	"It's All I Can Do" (1981)	"Another Sleepless Night" (1982)

For the similarly-titled Dolly Parton song, see All I Can Do

"It's All I Can Do" is a song written by Richard Leigh and Archie Jordan, and recorded by Canadian country music artist Anne Murray. It was released in September 1981 as the third single from her album Where Do You Go When You Dream. The song reached No. 1 on the RPM Country Tracks chart in Canada and #9 on the Billboard Hot Country Singles chart in the United States. The song was also recorded by American country music artist Ronnie Milsap for his 1981 album There's No Gettin' Over Me.

== Charts ==
Chart (1981)	Peak position
Canadian RPM Country Tracks	1
Canada RPM Adult Contemporary	1
US Hot Country Songs (Billboard)	9
US Adult Contemporary (Billboard)	14
US Billboard Hot 100	53
