= Ronnie Milsap discography =

- Studio albums: 28
- Live albums: 3
- Compilation albums: 18+
- Singles: 80+
- Music videos: 13
- No. 1 singles overall: 42

The discography of American country music singer Ronnie Milsap consists of 29 studio albums, 3 live albums, more than 18 compilations, and over 80 singles. Since releasing his first album in 1971, Milsap has had 42 number-one hits on the Billboard country chart and sold over 35 million albums. In addition, 26 of his US number-one hits reached number-one on the RPM Top Country Tracks chart in Canada; three songs that did not reach number-one in the US were number one in Canada; and two of his US number-one country hits also topped the US adult contemporary chart. As of 2000, he has recorded 7 gold albums, 1 platinum album, and 1 double-platinum album.

== Studio albums ==
=== 1970s ===
Title	Album details	Peak chart positions			Certifications (sales threshold)
Title	Album details	US Country	US	CAN Country	Certifications (sales threshold)
Ronnie Milsap	Release date: August 1971; Label: Warner Bros. Records	—	—	—	
Where My Heart Is	Release date: September 1973; Label: RCA Records	5	—	—	
Pure Love	Release date: April 1974; Label: RCA Records	8	—	—	
A Legend in My Time	Release date: 1975; Label: RCA Records	4	138	—	
Night Things	Release date: October 1975; Label: RCA Records	2	191	—	CAN: Gold
20/20 Vision	Release date: May 1976; Label: RCA Records	3	—	—	
It Was Almost Like a Song	Release date: 1977; Label: RCA Records	3	97	18	US: Gold
Only One Love in My Life	Release date: June 17, 1978; Label: RCA Records	3	109	9	US: Gold
Images	Release date: June 23, 1979; Label: RCA Records	5	98	9	
"—" denotes releases that did not chart

=== 1980s and 1990s ===
Title	Album details	Peak chart positions			Certifications (sales threshold)
Title	Album details	US Country	US	CAN Country	Certifications (sales threshold)
Milsap Magic	Release date: April 5, 1980; Label: RCA Records	3	137	—	
Out Where the Bright Lights Are Glowing	Release date: March 30, 1981; Label: RCA Records	6	89	—	
There's No Gettin' Over Me	Release date: August 1981; Label: RCA Records	1	31	—	US: Gold
Inside	Release date: 1982; Label: RCA Records	4	66	—	
Keyed Up	Release date: March 31, 1983; Label: RCA Records	2	36	—	
One More Try for Love	Release date: April 30, 1984; Label: RCA Records	10	180	2	
Lost in the Fifties Tonight	Release date: 1985; Label: RCA Records	1	121	—	US: Gold
Christmas with Ronnie Milsap	Release date: 1986; Label: RCA Records	65	—	—	
Heart & Soul	Release date: 1987; Label: RCA Records	13	—	—	
Stranger Things Have Happened	Release date: February 28, 1989; Label: RCA Records	20	—	20	
Back to the Grindstone	Release date: March 12, 1991; Label: RCA Records	24	172	—	
True Believer	Release date: June 7, 1993; Label: Liberty Records	—	—	—	
"—" denotes releases that did not chart

=== 2000s-present ===
Title	Album details	Peak chart positions				Sales
Title	Album details	US Country	US	US Christ	US Jazz	Sales
Just for a Thrill	Release date: September 21, 2004; Label: Image Entertainment	—	—	—	11	
My Life	Release date: June 27, 2006; Label: RCA Records	46	—	—	—	
Then Sings My Soul	Release date: March 10, 2009; Label: StarSong; 12 of the 24 songs were repackaged as "Gospel Greats", released on Feb. 12, 2016 by Black River Entertainment	19	127	8	—	
Country Again	Release date: July 26, 2011; Label: Bigger Picture Music Group	—	—	—	—	
Summer Number Seventeen	Release date: March 18, 2014; Label: Legacy Recordings	—	—	—	—	
The Duets	Release date: January 18, 2019; Label: Riser House/Sony	—	—	—	—	US: 5,200
A Better Word for Love	Release date: April 30, 2021; Label: Black River Entertainment	—	—	—	—	
"—" denotes releases that did not chart

== Live albums ==
Title	Album details	Peak positions	Certifications (sales threshold)
Title	Album details	US Country	Certifications (sales threshold)
Ronnie Milsap Live	Release date: 1976; Label: RCA Records	2	US: Gold
Ronnie Milsap Live	Release date: May 21, 2002; Label: Image Entertainment; New live album despite the same title as his 1976 live album	—	—
Blast From The Past	Release date: March 12, 2021; The Classic 1981 Texas Broadcast	—	—
"—" denotes releases that did not chart

== Compilation albums ==
Title	Album details	Peak chart positions		Certifications (sales threshold)
Title	Album details	US Country	US	Certifications (sales threshold)
The Country Soul Of Ronnie Milsap	Release date: 1974; Label: Trip			
A Rose By Any Other Name	Release date: 1975; Label: Warner Bros. Records	23		
16 Hits	Release date: 1976; Label: Trip			
The Hits Of Ronnie Milsap	Release date: 1978; Label: RCA Victor			
Greatest Hits (Note: Greatest Hits also peaked at number 10 on the RPM Country Albums chart in Canada.)	Release date: October 11, 1980; Label: RCA Records	1	36	CAN: Platinum; US: 2× Platinum
Greatest Hits, Vol. 2	Release date: 1985; Label: RCA Records	1	102	US: Platinum
Greatest Hits, Vol. 3	Release date: 1991; Label: RCA Records	—	—	
The Essential Ronnie Milsap	Release date: 1995; Label: RCA Records	—	—	
Super Hits	Release date: May 21, 1996; Label: RCA Records	—	—	
Sings His Best Hits for Capitol Records	Release date: September 17, 1996; Label: Capitol Nashville; Re-recordings of 10 songs from his RCA Records era	—	—	
40 #1 Hits	Release date: June 6, 2000; Label: Virgin Records	19	178	US: Gold
RCA Country Legends	Release date: June 19, 2001; Label: Buddha Records	—	—	
Ultimate Ronnie Milsap	Release date: March 2, 2004; Label: RCA Records	—	—	
All American Country	Release date: June 22, 2004; Label: Collectables Records	—	—	
The Essential Ronnie Milsap	Release date: August 1, 2006; Label: RCA Records; Different than the 1995 compilation The Essential Ronnie Milsap	—	—	
16 Biggest Hits	Release date: March 24, 2007; Label: Legacy Recordings	67	—	
Playlist: The Very Best of Ronnie Milsap	Release date: June 17, 2008; Label: Sony BMG	—	—	
The RCA Albums Collection	Release date: November 4, 2014; Label: Legacy Recordings	—	—	
The Best of Ronnie Milsap	Release date: May 29, 2020; Label: Craft Recordings	—	—	
"—" denotes releases that did not chart

== Singles ==
=== 1960s and 1970s ===
Year	Single	Peak positions									Album
Year	Single	US Country	US	US R&B	US AC	CAN Country	CAN	CAN AC	AUS	NZ	Album
1963	"Total Disaster / It Went To Your Head"	—	—	—	—	—	—	—	—	—	
1965	"Never Had It So Good / Let's Go Get Stoned"	—	106 (Note: "Never Had It So Good" did not enter the Billboard Hot 100, but peaked at number 6 on Bubbling Under Hot 100 Singles, which acts as a 25-song extension of the Hot 100.)	19	—	—	—	—	—	—	
1966	"When It Comes To My Baby"	—	—	—	—	—	—	—	—	—	
1966	"The End Of The World"	—	—	—	—	—	—	—	—	—	
1966	"Ain't No Soul Left In These Ole Shoes / Another Branch From The Old Tree"	—	—	—	—	—	—	—	—	—	
1967	"Wish You Were Here / A Loving Background"	—	—	—	—	—	—	—	—	—	
1967	"The House of the Rising Sun"	—	—	—	—	—	—	—	—	—	
1968	"Do What You Gotta Do"	—	—	—	—	—	—	—	—	—	
1969	"Denver"	—	123 (Note: "Denver" did not enter the Hot 100, but peaked at number 23 on Bubbling Under Hot 100 Singles.)	—	—	—	—	—	—	—	
1970	"Loving You Is A Natural Thing / So Hung Up On Sylvia"	—	87	—	—	—	—	—	—	—	
1970	"A Rose By Any Other Name / Sermonette"	—	125 (Note: "A Rose by Any Other Name (Is Still a Rose)" did not enter the Hot 100, but peaked at number 25 on Bubbling Under Hot 100 Singles.)	—	—	—	—	—	—	—	
1971	"Sunday Rain"	—	—	—	—	—	—	—	—	—	Ronnie Milsap
1972	"Magic Me Again"	—	—	—	—	—	—	—	—	—	
1973	"I Hate You"/"(All Together Now) Let's Fall Apart" (Note: Single was released as a double A-side.)	10	—	—	—	14	—	—	—	—	Where My Heart Is
1973	"The Cat Was a Junkie"	—	—	—	—	—	—	—	—	18	Ronnie Milsap
1973	"That Girl Who Waits on Tables"	11	—	—	—	14	—	—	—	—	Where My Heart Is
1974	"Pure Love"	1	—	—	—	2	—	—	71	—	Pure Love
1974	"Please Don't Tell Me How the Story Ends"	1	95	—	—	1	—	—	—	—	Pure Love
1974	"(I'd Be) A Legend in My Time"	1	—	—	—	1	—	—	—	—	A Legend in My Time
1975	"Too Late to Worry, Too Blue to Cry"	6	101 (Note: "Too Late to Worry, Too Blue to Cry" did not enter the Billboard Hot 100, but peaked at number 1 on Bubbling Under Hot 100 Singles.)	—	—	3	91	—	—	—	A Legend in My Time
1975	"Daydreams About Night Things"	1	—	—	—	2	—	35	—	—	Night Things
1975	"Just in Case"	4	—	—	—	5	—	—	—	—	Night Things
1976	"What Goes On When the Sun Goes Down"	1	—	—	—	1	—	—	—	—	20/20 Vision
1976	"(I'm A) Stand by My Woman Man"	1	—	—	—	1	—	—	—	—	20/20 Vision
1976	"Let My Love Be Your Pillow"	1	—	—	—	1	—	—	—	—	Ronnie Milsap Live
1977	"It Was Almost Like a Song"	1	16	—	7	12	7	6	81	—	It Was Almost Like a Song
1977	"What a Difference You've Made in My Life"	1	80	—	19	1	96	43	—	—	It Was Almost Like a Song
1978	"Only One Love in My Life"	1	63	—	24	1	83	—	—	—	Only One Love in My Life
1978	"Let's Take the Long Way Around the World"	1	—	—	33	1	—	—	—	—	Only One Love in My Life
1979	"Back on My Mind Again"/"Santa Barbara"	2	—	—	—	1	—	—	—	—	Only One Love in My Life
1979	"Nobody Likes Sad Songs"	1	—	—	—	1	—	—	—	—	Images
1979	"In No Time at All"/"Get It Up"	6	43 (Note: "In No Time at All" and "Get It Up" charted as a double A-Side on the Hot Country Songs charts; on the Hot 100, only "Get It Up" charted.)	—	—	9	—	—	—	—	Images
"—" denotes releases that did not chart

=== 1980s ===
Year	Single	Peak positions							Album
Year	Single	US Country	US	US AC	CAN Country	CAN	CAN AC	AUS	Album
1980	"Why Don't You Spend the Night"	1	—	—	2	—	—	—	Milsap Magic
1980	"My Heart"/"Silent Night (After the Fight)"	1	—	—	13	—	—	—	Milsap Magic
1980	"Cowboys and Clowns"/"Misery Loves Company"	1	103 (Note: "Cowboys and Clowns" did not enter the Billboard Hot 100, but peaked at number 3 on Bubbling Under Hot 100 Singles.)	—	10	—	—	—	Bronco Billy (soundtrack)
1980	"Smoky Mountain Rain"	1	24	1	8	—	—	—	Greatest Hits
1981	"Am I Losing You"	1	—	—	1	—	—	—	Out Where the Bright Lights Are Glowing
1981	"(There's) No Gettin' Over Me"	1	5	2	1	21	1	98	There's No Gettin' Over Me
1981	"I Wouldn't Have Missed It for the World"	1	20	3	1	—	1	57	There's No Gettin' Over Me
1982	"Any Day Now"	1	14	1	1	—	1	96	Inside
1982	"He Got You"	1	59	15	2	—	10	—	Inside
1982	"Inside"/"Carolina Dreams"	1	—	27	1	—	6	—	Inside
1983	"Stranger in My House"/"Is It Over"	5	23	8	1	42	55	55	Keyed Up
1983	"Don't You Know How Much I Love You"	1	58	12	1	—	8	—	Keyed Up
1983	"Show Her"	1	103 (Note: "Show Her" did not enter the Billboard Hot 100, but peaked at number 3 on Bubbling Under Hot 100 Singles.)	17	1	—	4	—	Keyed Up
1984	"Still Losing You"	1	—	29	1	—	—	—	One More Try for Love
1984	"Prisoner of the Highway"	6	—	—	9	—	—	—	One More Try for Love
1984	"She Loves My Car"	—	84	—	—	—	—	—	One More Try for Love
1985	"She Keeps the Home Fires Burning"	1	—	—	1	—	—	—	Greatest Hits, Volume 2
1985	"Lost in the Fifties Tonight (In the Still of the Night)"	1	—	8	1	—	20	66	Greatest Hits, Volume 2
1986	"Happy, Happy Birthday Baby"	1	—	35	1	—	—	—	Lost in the Fifties Tonight
1986	"In Love"	1	—	—	1	—	—	—	Lost in the Fifties Tonight
1986	"How Do I Turn You On"	1	—	—	1	—	—	—	Lost in the Fifties Tonight
1987	"Snap Your Fingers"	1	—	—	1	—	—	—	Heart & Soul
1987	"Make No Mistake, She's Mine" (with Kenny Rogers)	1	—	42	1	—	—	—	Heart & Soul
1987	"Where Do the Nights Go"	1	—	—	1	—	—	—	Heart & Soul
1988	"Old Folks" (with Mike Reid)	2	—	—	12	—	—	—	Heart & Soul
1988	"Button Off My Shirt"	4	—	—	4	—	—	—	Heart & Soul
1989	"Don't You Ever Get Tired (Of Hurting Me)"	1	—	—	2	—	—	—	Stranger Things Have Happened
1989	"Houston Solution"	4	—	—	12	—	—	—	Stranger Things Have Happened
1989	"A Woman in Love"	1	—	—	1	—	—	—	Stranger Things Have Happened
"—" denotes releases that did not chart

=== 1990s ===
Year	Single	Peak positions			Album
Year	Single	US Country	US AC	CAN Country	Album
1990	"Stranger Things Have Happened"	2	—	1	Stranger Things Have Happened
1991	"Are You Lovin' Me Like I'm Lovin' You"	3	—	3	Back to the Grindstone
1991	"Since I Don't Have You"	6	25	7	Back to the Grindstone
1991	"Turn That Radio On"	4	—	2	Back to the Grindstone
1992	"All Is Fair in Love and War"	11	—	13	Back to the Grindstone
1992	"L.A. to the Moon"	45	—	73	Greatest Hits, Vol. 3
1993	"True Believer"	30	—	—	True Believer
1993	"I'm Playing for You"	—	—	—	True Believer
"—" denotes releases that did not chart

=== 2000s-present ===
Year	Single	Peak positions		Album
Year	Single	US Country	US AC	Album
2000	"Time, Love and Money"	57	—	40 #1 Hits
2000	"Livin' on Love"	—	—	40 #1 Hits
2006	"Local Girls"	54	—	My Life
2006	"You Don't Know My Love" (with Jypsi)	—	—	My Life
2009	"Up to Zion"	—	—	Then Sings My Soul
2009	"My First Ride" (with Trace Adkins)	—	—	—N/a
2011	"If You Don't Want Me To (The Freeze)"	—	—	Country Again
2013	"Summer Number Seventeen"	—	—	Summer Number Seventeen
2019	"Southern Boys and Detroit Wheels" (with Billy Gibbons)	—	—	The Duets
2019	"Smoky Mountain Rain" (with Dolly Parton)	—	27	The Duets
2020	"Merry Merry Christmas Baby"	—	—	—N/a
2021	"Wild Honey"	—	—	A Better Word For Love
"—" denotes releases that did not chart

=== As a featured artist ===
Year	Single	Artist	Peak chart positions							Certifications	Album
Year	Single	Artist	US Country	US Country Airplay	US	CAN Country	CAN	AUS	SCO	Certifications	Album
2016	"Forever Country"	Artists of Then, Now & Forever	1	33	21	39	25	26	29	RIAA: Gold	Non-album singles
2023	"Jambalaya (On the Bayou)"	Deborah Silver	—	—	—	—	—	—	—		Non-album singles

=== Promotional singles ===
Year	Single	Peak positions	Album
Year	Single	US Country	Album
1975	"She Even Woke Me Up to Say Goodbye"	15	A Rose by Any Other Name
1975	"A Rose by Any Other Name" (re-release)	77	A Rose by Any Other Name
1976	"Crying"	79	A Rose by Any Other Name

== Music videos ==
Year	Video	Director
1981	"(There's) No Getting Over Me"	
1981	"It's All I Can Do"	
1981	"I Wouldn't Have Missed It For the World"	
1981	"Too Big For Words"	
1982	"Any Day Now"	David Hogan
1983	"Stranger in My House"	David Hogan
1984	"She Loves My Car"	David Hogan
1985	"Lost in the Fifties Tonight (In the Still of the Night)"	David Hogan
1988	"Old Folks"	Phran Schwartz
1989	"Houston Solution" (Live)	Steve Womack
1989	"A Woman in Love"	John Lloyd Miller
1991	"Since I Don't Have You"	Deaton Flanigen
1993	"I'm Playing for You"	Steven Goldmann
2006	"Local Girls"	Eric Welch
2011	"If You Dont Want Me To (The Freeze)"	
2016	"Forever Country" (Artists of Then, Now & Forever)	Joseph Kahn
2021	"Big Bertha" (Lyric Video)" (featuring Vince Gill)	
