= 40 Number 1 Hits =

40 #1 Hits
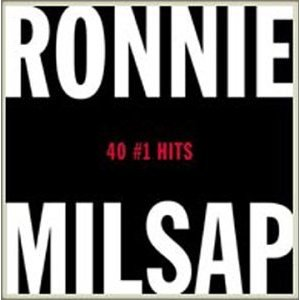

Compilation album by Ronnie Milsap
- Released: June 6, 2000
- Genre: Country
- Label: Virgin
- Producer: Various

Ronnie Milsap chronology
Super Hits (1996)	40 #1 Hits (2000)	RCA Country Legends (2001)

Singles from 20 #1 Hits
- 1. "Time, Love and Money"

Professional ratings
Review scores
Source	Rating
Allmusic	5/5 stars

40 #1 Hits is a greatest hits collection by American country music artist Ronnie Milsap, released in 2000 by Virgin Records. It peaked at number 19 on the Billboard Top Country Albums chart. The album has been certified Gold by the RIAA for shipments of over 500,000 copies.

== Track listing ==
=== Disc 1 ===
1. "Pure Love" (Eddie Rabbitt) – 2:22
2. "Please Don't Tell Me How the Story Ends" (Kris Kristofferson) – 2:44
3. "(I'd Be) A Legend in My Time" (Don Gibson) – 2:58
4. "Too Late to Worry, Too Blue to Cry" (Al Dexter) – 3:08
5. "Daydreams About Night Things" (John Schweers) – 2:23
6. "Just in Case" (Hugh Moffatt) – 2:59
7. "What Goes On When the Sun Goes Down" (Schweers) – 2:53
8. "(I'm A) Stand by My Woman Man" (Kent Robbins) – 2:59
9. "Let My Love Be Your Pillow" (Schweers) – 3:06
10. "It Was Almost Like a Song" (Hal David, Archie Jordan) – 3:38
11. "What a Difference You've Made in My Life" (Jordan) – 3:58
12. "Only One Love in My Life" (R.C. Bannon, John Bettis) – 3:29
13. "Let's Take the Long Way Around the World" (Jordan, Naomi Martin) – 3:26
14. "Back on My Mind Again" (Conrad Pierce, Charles Quillen) – 3:16
15. "Nobody Likes Sad Songs" (Bob McDill, Wayland Holyfield) – 4:03
16. "Why Don't You Spend the Night" (McDill) – 4:10
17. "My Heart" (Don Pfrimmer, Quillen) – 2:42
18. "Cowboys and Clowns" (Steve Dorff, Snuff Garrett, Gary Harju, Larry Herbstritt) – 3:08
19. "Smoky Mountain Rain" (Kye Fleming, Dennis Morgan) – 3:45
20. "Am I Losing You" (Jim Reeves) – 3:37
21. "(There's) No Gettin' Over Me" (Walt Aldridge, Tom Brasfield) – 3:16
22. "I Wouldn't Have Missed It for the World" (Fleming, Morgan, Quillen) – 3:34
23. "Any Day Now" (Burt Bacharach, Bob Hilliard) – 3:43

=== Disc 2 ===
1. "He Got You" (Ralph Murray, Bobby Wood) – 3:33
2. "Inside" (Mike Reid) – 4:02
3. "Stranger in My House" (Reid) – 4:13
4. "Don't You Know How Much I Love You" (Michael Stewart, Dan Williams) – 3:20
5. "Show Her" (Reid) – 4:00
6. "Still Losing You" (Reid) – 5:19
7. "She Keeps the Home Fires Burning" (Morgan, Reid, Pfrimmer) – 4:01
8. "Lost in the Fifties Tonight (In the Still of the Night)" (Fred Parris, Reid, Troy Seals) – 4:17
9. "Happy, Happy Birthday Baby" (Margo Sylvia, Gilbert Lopez) – 3:41
10. "In Love" (Bruce Dees, Reid) – 4:34
11. "How Do I Turn You On" (Robert Byrne, Reid) – 4:45
12. "Snap Your Fingers" (Grady Martin, Alex Zanetis) – 3:05
13. "Make No Mistake, She's Mine" (Kim Carnes) – 3:58
  - with Kenny Rogers
14. "Where Do the Nights Go" (Rory Bourke, Reid) – 4:33
15. "Don't You Ever Get Tired (Of Hurting Me)" (Hank Cochran) – 3:06
16. "A Woman in Love" (Doug Millett, Wright) – 3:16
17. "Stranger Things Have Happened" (Roger Murrah, Keith Stegall) – 3:11
18. "Since I Don't Have You" (Joseph Rock, Jimmy Beaumont, Lenny Martin) – 4:15
19. "Livin' on Love" (Craig Fuller, Gary Nicholson) – 3:43
20. "Time, Love and Money" (Sherrié Austin, Dave Berg, Will Rambeaux) – 3:25

== Charts ==
=== Weekly charts ===
Chart (2000–2001)	Peak position
US Billboard 200	178
US Top Country Albums (Billboard)	19

=== Year-end charts ===
Chart (2001)	Position
US Top Country Albums (Billboard)	70

== Certifications ==
Region	Certification	Certified units/sales
United States (RIAA)	Gold	500,000^{^}
^{^} Shipments figures based on certification alone.
