= Sings His Best Hits for Capitol Records =

Studio album by Ronnie Milsap
- Released: September 17, 1996
- Genre: Country
- Length: 34:30
- Label: Capitol Nashville
- Producer: Rob Galbraith, Ronnie Milsap, Nancy H. Williams

Ronnie Milsap chronology
The Essential Ronnie Milsap (1995)	Sings His Best Hits for Capitol Records (1996)	Super Hits (1996)

Sings His Best Hits for Capitol Records is an album by Country music artist Ronnie Milsap. It was released in 1996 under Capitol Nashville, his first for the label. The album consisted of re-recordings of past hits by Milsap including "Stranger in My House," "Smoky Mountain Rain" and "Pure Love." No singles were released.

== Track listing ==
1. "Stranger in My House" (Mike Reid) - 4:13
2. "It Was Almost Like a Song" (Hal David, Archie Jordan) - 3:50
3. "Snap Your Fingers" (Grady Martin, Alex Zanetis) - 3:00
4. "Daydreams About Night Things" (John Schweers) - 2:24
5. "Smoky Mountain Rain" (Kye Fleming, Dennis Morgan) - 3:57
6. "Lost in the Fifties Tonight (In the Still of the Night)" (Fred Parris, Reid, Troy Seals) - 4:32
7. "(There's) No Gettin' Over Me" (Walt Aldridge, Tom Brasfield) - 3:13
8. "Pure Love" (Eddie Rabbitt) - 2:23
9. "(I'm A) Stand by My Woman Man" (Kent Robbins) - 3:04
10. "Button Off My Shirt" (Billy Livsey, Graham Lyle) - 3:54

== Personnel ==
- Jamie Brantley - electric guitar, background vocals
- Carol Chase - background vocals
- Bruce Dees - acoustic guitar, electric guitar, background vocals
- Dan Dugmore - steel guitar
- Steve Gibson - acoustic guitar
- Warren Gowers - bass guitar, background vocals
- Adam Hampton - keyboards, background vocals
- Rhonda Hampton - background vocals
- Ronnie Milsap - keyboards, lead vocals, background vocals
- Cindy Richardson-Walker - background vocals
- Lisa Silver - background vocals
- Jay Spell - keyboards
- Lonnie Wilson - drums
