= Greatest Hits (Ronnie Milsap album) =

Compilation album by Ronnie Milsap
- Released: October 11, 1980
- Genre: Country
- Length: 27:57
- Label: RCA Victor
- Producers: Tom Collins; Jack D. Johnson; Ronnie Milsap

Ronnie Milsap chronology
Milsap Magic (1980)	Greatest Hits (1980)	Out Where the Bright Lights Are Glowing (1981)

Singles from Greatest Hits
- 1. "Smoky Mountain Rain" Released: October 11, 1980

Professional ratings
Review scores
Source	Rating
Allmusic	4.5/5 stars

Greatest Hits is a compilation album by American country music artist Ronnie Milsap. It was released in 1980 by RCA Records . The album's only single, "Smoky Mountain Rain," reached Number One on both the Billboard Hot Country Singles and Easy Listening charts. The album has been certified 2× Platinum by the RIAA for shipments of over 2 million copies.

== Track listing ==
No.	Title	Writer(s)	Length
1.	"(I'd Be) A Legend in My Time""	Don Gibson	2:56
2.	"(I'm A) Stand by My Woman Man"	Kent Robbins	2:57
3.	"Pure Love"	Eddie Rabbitt	2:21
4.	"Daydreams About Night Things"	John Schweers	2:22
5.	"It Was Almost Like a Song"	Hal David, Archie Jordan	3:39
6.	"Smoky Mountain Rain"	Kye Fleming, Dennis Morgan	3:43
7.	"Please Don't Tell Me How the Story Ends"	Kris Kristofferson	2:43
8.	"Back on My Mind Again"	Conrad Pierce, Charles Quillen	3:15
9.	"What a Difference You've Made in My Life"	Jordan	4:01

=== Original LP track listing ===
The original LP, cassette, and 8-track, plus 1984 CD issues had a slightly different track listing:

1. "Smoky Mountain Rain"
2. "(I'd Be) A Legend in My Time"
3. "(I'm a) Stand by My Woman Man"
4. "I Hate You"
5. "Pure Love"
6. "It Was Almost Like a Song"
7. "Daydreams About Night Things"
8. "Let's Take the Long Way Around the World"
9. "Let My Love Be Your Pillow"
10. "Please Don't Tell Me How the Story Ends"
11. "Back on My Mind Again"
12. "What a Difference You've Made in My Life"

== Charts ==
=== Weekly charts ===
Chart (1980–1981)	Peak position
Canadian Country Albums (RPM)	10
US Billboard 200	36
US Top Country Albums (Billboard)	1

=== Year-end charts ===
Chart (1981)	Position
US Billboard 200	57
US Top Country Albums (Billboard)	5

Chart (1982)	Position
US Top Country Albums (Billboard)	28

== Certifications ==
Region	Certification	Certified units/sales
United States (RIAA)	2× Platinum	2,000,000^{^}
^{^} Shipments figures based on certification alone.
