= Greatest Hits, Vol. 3 (Ronnie Milsap album) =

Album by Ronnie Milsap

Compilation album by Ronnie Milsap
- Released: 1991
- Genre: Country
- Length: 38:49
- Label: RCA
- Producers: Tom Collins; Rob Galbraith; Kyle Lehning; Ronnie Milsap

Ronnie Milsap chronology
| Back to the Grindstone (1991) | Greatest Hits, Vol. 3 (1991) | True Believer (1993) |

Singles from Greatest Hits, Vol. 3
- 1. "L.A. to the Moon"

Professional ratings
Review scores
| Source | Rating |
|---|---|
| Allmusic | 3/5 stars |

Greatest Hits, Vol. 3 is a compilation album by American country music artist Ronnie Milsap. It was released in 1991 by RCA Records. The album's only single, "L.A. to the Moon," peaked at #45 on the Billboard Hot Country Singles & Tracks chart.

== Track listing ==
| No. | Title | Writer(s) | Length |
|---|---|---|---|
| 1. | "L.A. to the Moon" | Susan Longacre, Lonnie Wilson | 4:23 |
| 2. | "Happy, Happy Birthday Baby" | Margo Sylvia, Gilbert Lopez | 3:39 |
| 3. | "Snap Your Fingers" | Grady Martin, Alex Zanetis | 3:03 |
| 4. | "Where Do the Nights Go" | Rory Bourke, Mike Reid | 4:30 |
| 5. | "Button Off My Shirt" | Billy Livsey, Graham Lyle | 3:53 |
| 6. | "Quicksand" | Gary Burr, Will Robinson | 4:12 |
| 7. | "Stranger Things Have Happened" | Roger Murrah, Keith Stegall | 3:12 |
| 8. | "A Woman in Love" | Doug Millett, Curtis Wright | 3:16 |
| 9. | "How Do I Turn You On" | Robert Byrne, Reid | 4:44 |
| 10. | "Prisoner of the Highway" | Reid | 4:10 |

== Personnel on tracks 1 & 6 ==
- Jamie Brantley - electric guitar, background vocals
- Steve Brantley - background vocals
- Mark Casstevens - acoustic guitar
- Carol Chase - background vocals
- Bruce Dees - background vocals
- Stuart Duncan - fiddle
- Steve Gibson - electric guitar
- Dann Huff - electric guitar
- John Hughey - steel guitar
- Mitch Humphries - keyboards
- David Hungate - bass guitar
- Shane Keister - synthesizer
- Paul Leim - drums, percussion
- Ronnie Milsap - keyboards, lead vocals, background vocals
- Weldon Myrick - steel guitar
- The Nashville String Machine - strings
- Hargus "Pig" Robbins - keyboards
- Lisa Silver - background vocals
- Billy Joe Walker Jr. - acoustic guitar
- Cindy Richardson-Walker - background vocals
- Bergen White - string arrangements
