= Stranger in My House =

Stranger in My House may refer to:

- "Stranger in My House" (Ronnie Milsap song)
- "Stranger in My House" (Tamia song)
- Stranger in My House (film), also known as Total Stranger which is its current title, a 1999 film starring Zoe McLellan
