= Old Folks =

Old Folks may refer to:

- "Old Folks" (1938 song), jazz standard by Willard Robison and Dedette Lee Hill, recorded by Larry Clinton, Miles Davis, and others
- "Old Folks" (Ronnie Milsap and Mike Reid song), country song by Mike Reid, recorded by Ronnie Milsap and Mike Reid (1988)
- "Old Folks", alternative music song and single by the band A from their album 'A' vs. Monkey Kong (1999)

== See also ==
- "Old Folks at Home", a song by Stephen Foster
