= 20/20 Vision (Ronnie Milsap album) =

Studio album by Ronnie Milsap
- Released: 1976
- Genre: Country
- Length: 32:10
- Label: RCA
- Producers: Tom Collins, Jack D. Johnson

Ronnie Milsap chronology
Night Things (1975)	20/20 Vision (1976)	It Was Almost Like a Song (1977)

Singles from 20/20 Vision
- 1. "What Goes On When the Sun Goes Down" Released: March 20, 1976; 2. "(I'm A) Stand by My Woman Man" Released: July 10, 1976

Professional ratings
Review scores
Source	Rating
Allmusic	5/5 stars

20/20 Vision is the seventh studio album by American country music artist Ronnie Milsap, released in 1976.

== Track listing ==
No.	Title	Writer(s)	Length
1.	"20/20 Vision"	Geoffrey Morgan	3:05
2.	"Lovers, Friends and Strangers"	Kent Robbins	2:52
3.	"Not That I Care"	Cindy Walker	3:18
4.	"Lovesick Blues"	Cliff Friend, Irving Mills	3:24
5.	"You Snap Your Fingers (And I'm Back in Your Hands)"	John Schweers	3:19
6.	"Looking Out My Window Through the Pain"	Schweers	3:56
7.	"What Goes On When the Sun Goes Down"	Schweers	2:51
8.	"You've Still Got a Place in My Heart"	Leon Payne	3:24
9.	"I Got Home Just in Time to Say Goodbye"	Wayne Kemp, "Wild" Bill Emerson	3:05
10.	"(I'm A) Stand by My Woman Man"	Robbins	2:56

Note: The song "You Snap Your Fingers (And I'm Back in Your Hands)" later appeared as a track on his 1989 album Stranger Things Have Happened.

== Personnel ==
- Acoustic Guitar: Jimmy Capps, Chip Young
- Background Vocals: The Holladay Sisters (tracks 2,5,10), The Jordanaires (tracks 1,3,4,6,7,9), The Nashville Edition (track 8)
- Bass guitar: Mike Leech, Henry Strzelecki, Jack Williams
- Drums: Hayward Bishop, Larrie Londin, Kenny Malone
- Electric guitar: Glenn Keener, Reggie Young
- Fiddle: Jim Buchanan, Marcy Cates, Marjorie Cates, Tommy Williams
- Harmonica: Charlie McCoy, Terry McMillan
- Lead Vocals: Ronnie Milsap
- Percussion: Farrell Morris
- Piano: Ronnie Milsap, Bobby Ogdin, Hargus "Pig" Robbins
- Steel Guitar: Lloyd Green, John Hughey, Dick Overbey, Hal Rugg
- String Arranger: D. Bergen White (tracks 1,3,6,8)
- Vibraphone: Charlie McCoy, Farrell Morris

== Charts ==
=== Singles ===
Year	Song	Chart	Position	Date
1976	"What Goes on When the Sun Goes Down"	Hot Country Singles	1	
1976	"(I'm A) Stand by My Woman Man"	Hot Country Singles	1	
