= Night Things (Ronnie Milsap album) =

Studio album by Ronnie Milsap
- Released: 1975
- Recorded: 1975
- Genre: Country
- Length: 27:54
- Label: RCA
- Producers: Tom Collins, Jack D. Johnson

Ronnie Milsap chronology
A Rose by Any Other Name (1975)	Night Things (1975)	20/20 Vision (1975)

Singles from Night Things
- 1. "Daydreams About Night Things" Released: July 19, 1975; 2. "Just in Case" Released: October 25, 1975

Professional ratings
Review scores
Source	Rating
Allmusic	link

Night Things is the fifth studio album by American country music artist Ronnie Milsap, released in 1975. It produced a #1 country hit in its title track, and "Just in Case" was a #4 single as well.

== Track listing ==
No.	Title	Writer(s)	Length
1.	"(After Sweet Memories) Play Born to Lose Again"	Kent Robbins	2:59
2.	"Who'll Turn Out the Lights (In Your World Tonight)"	Wayne Kemp, Mack Vickery	3:12
3.	"Daydreams About Night Things"	John Schweers	2:22
4.	"I'm No Good at Goodbyes"	Ben Peters	2:39
5.	"Just in Case"	Hugh Moffatt	2:49
6.	"Remember to Remind Me (I'm Leaving)"	Charles Quillen, John Russell	2:55
7.	"Borrowed Angel"	Mel Street	3:09
8.	"Love Takes a Long Time to Die"	Dennis Morgan	2:35
9.	"Linda on My Mind"	Conway Twitty	2:35
10.	"I'll Be There (If You Ever Want Me)"	Rusty Gabbard, Ray Price	2:39
Total length:			27:54

== Production ==
- Executive Producer: Dave Nives
- Produced By Tom Collins & Jack D. Johnson
- Engineers: Bill Harris, Al Pachucki, David Roys, Mike Shockley, Bill Vandevort

== Personnel ==
- Drums: Hayword Bishop, Kenny Malone
- Percussion: Charlie McCoy, Farrell Morris
- Bass Guitar: Mike Leech, Henry Strzelecki
- Upright Bass: Joe Zinkan
- Piano: Ronnie Milsap, Bobby Ogdin, Hargus "Pig" Robbins, Jay Spell, Bobby Wood
- Guitars: Harold Bradley, Jimmy Capps, Ray Edenton, Steve Gibson, Glenn Keener, Dale Sellars, Chip Young, Reggie Young
- Steel Guitar: Pete Drake, Lloyd Green, John Hughey
- Harmonica: Charlie McCoy, Terry McMillan
- Fiddle: Jim Buchanan, Marcy Cates, Tommy Williams
- Lead Vocals: Ronnie Milsap
- Backing Vocals: Ronnie Milsap, The Jordanaires
- Strings arranged by D. Bergen White

== Charts ==
=== Singles ===
Year	Song	Chart	Position	Date
1975	"Daydreams About Night Things"	Hot Country Singles	1	
1975	"Just in Case"	Hot Country Singles	4	
