= Misery Loves Company (Porter Wagoner song) =

Single by Porter Wagoner

from the album A Slice of Life
- B-side: "I Cried Again"
- Released: November 1961
- Recorded: 1961, RCA Studios, Nashville, Tennessee
- Genre: Country
- Label: RCA Victor
- Songwriter(s): Jerry Reed
- Producer(s): Chet Atkins

Porter Wagoner singles chronology
| "Your Old Love Letters" (1961) | "Misery Loves Company" (1961) | "Cold Dark Waters" (1962) |

"Misery Loves Company" is a 1961 song by Jerry Reed, recorded first by Porter Wagoner. The single was the second number one country song of his career staying at the top spot for two weeks. "Misery Loves Company" spent twenty-nine weeks on the chart.

== Chart performance ==
| Chart (1961–1962) | Peak position |
|---|---|
| U.S. Billboard Hot C&W Sides | 1 |

== Cover versions ==
- It was covered in 1977 by Moe Bandy on his LP Cowboys Ain't Supposed to Cry.
- Another cover was recorded by Ronnie Milsap, and was credited as a B-side to his 1980 No. 1 country hit "Cowboys and Clowns." Ronnie would later re-record the song with Leon Russell for Ronnie's 2019 album "The Duets". The song was recorded around April 2016, being one of Russell's final recordings.
