= Only One Love in My Life (song) =

Single by Ronnie Milsap

from the album Only One Love in My Life
- B-side: "Back on My Mind Again"
- Released: June 3, 1978
- Recorded: 1977
- Genre: Country
- Length: 3:29
- Label: RCA Victor
- Songwriters: R.C. Bannon and John Bettis
- Producers: Tom Collins, Ronnie Milsap

Ronnie Milsap singles chronology
| "What a Difference You've Made in My Life" (1977) | "Only One Love in My Life" (1978) | "Let's Take the Long Way Around the World" (1978) |

""Only One Love in My Life" is a song written by R.C. Bannon and John Bettis, and recorded by American country music artist Ronnie Milsap. It was released one June 3, 1978 as the first single and title track from the album Only One Love in My Life. The song was Milsap's tenth number one on the country chart. The single stayed at number one for three weeks and spent a total of 11 weeks on the country chart's top 40.

== Chart performance ==
| Chart (1978) | Peak position |
|---|---|
| US Hot Country Songs (Billboard) | 1 |
| US Billboard Hot 100 | 63 |
| US Adult Contemporary (Billboard) | 24 |
| Canadian RPM Country Tracks | 1 |
| Canadian RPM Top Singles | 83 |
