= In No Time at All =

Single by Ronnie Milsap

from the album Images
- B-side: "Get It Up"
- Released: August 18, 1979
- Recorded: 1979
- Genre: Country
- Length: 3:47
- Label: RCA Victor
- Songwriters: Richard Leigh, Archie Jordan
- Producer: Ronnie Milsap

Ronnie Milsap singles chronology
"Nobody Likes Sad Songs" (1979)	"In No Time at All" (1979)	"Why Don't You Spend the Night" (1980)

"In No Time at All" is a song written by Richard Leigh and Archie Jordan, and recorded by American country music artist Ronnie Milsap. It was released in August 1979 as the second single from his album Images. The song reached number 6 on the Billboard Hot Country Singles chart.

== Chart performance ==
Chart (1979)	Peak position
US Hot Country Songs (Billboard)	6
Canadian RPM Country Tracks	9

== "Get It Up" ==
The flip side to "In No Time At All" was "Get It Up." Styled as a disco song, the song was a "tag-along" flip on the Hot Country Singles chart, and independently reached No. 43 on the Hot 100.

=== Chart performance ===
Chart (1979)	Peak position
U.S. Billboard Hot 100	43
