= My Life (Ronnie Milsap album) =

Studio album by Ronnie Milsap
- Released: June 27, 2006
- Genre: Country
- Label: RCA
- Producer: Keith Stegall

Ronnie Milsap chronology
Just for a Thrill (2004)	My Life (2006)	16 Biggest Hits (2007)

My Life was the twenty-third studio album of Country music artist Ronnie Milsap. It was released in 2006, marking his return to RCA Records, after a departure in 1991 following Back to the Grindstone. Two singles were released from the album including "Local Girls" and "You Don't Know My Love", the latter did not chart but the former reached No. 54 on country charts, Milsap's first activity on the chart since the release of "Time, Love and Money" from his 2000 compilation album 40 #1 Hits.

The track "If It's Gonna Rain" was previously recorded by country music artist George Strait on his 2000 self-named album.

== Content ==
My Life starts off with the track, "You Don't Know My Love", which Milsap released as his second single from the album. Described by about.com as "a little funky," the song is "upbeat" while describing "stable love." The third track "My Life", shares its name with the album, and is reflective, finding the performer "reminiscing about his life." Allmusic remarked that the song had "nostalgic undertones" and was perfect for an individual in their sixties. Milsap was 61 upon the album's release. The fourth track, "If It's Gonna Rain", was written by songwriter Dean Dillon among others. Dillon is best known for his collaborations with George Strait, who had recorded the song six years prior to Milsap. "Rain" is a ballad that centers around lost love, repeating the chorus, "If It's Gonna Rain, Let it pour'" throughout the song. The next track, "Time Keeps Slipping Away" is described as "catchy" by about.com. The song discusses the fast-paced life of 21st century America.

Milsap performs "Local Girls" amidst a party in the song's music video

The seventh track, "A Day in the Life of America", is described by allmusic.com as a "chronicling of mundane everyday events that borders on the depressing." The song discusses such activities as waiting in traffic, drinking coffee, microwaving dinner, checking e-mail, watching television in a day, and then proceeding to repeat the cycle the following day, while commenting that it's "just a day, a day in the life of America". The ninth track, "Local Girls" was released as a single, charting at No. 54. The song describes a man's visit to a tropical location, and his discovery of a "local girl", whom he ultimately marries. A video was released with the track. It features Milsap performing the song in a party setting.

== Reception ==
The record peaked at No. 46 on the country albums chart, Milsap's first appearance on the chart since Back to the Grindstone. Allmusic gave the album four stars, describing it as "bright and tuneful and relaxed as the best of [Milsap's] early-[1980s] crossover albums" remaining "true" to his "strengths as a country-pop hitmaker." The tracks "A Day in the Life of America" and "My Life" are cited as addressing "American life in the early 2000s." About.com gave the album five stars, commenting that Milsap's voice "has remained virtually unchanged since he hit the airwaves in the early [1970s]."

== Track listing ==
No.	Title	Writer(s)	Length
1.	"You Don't Know My Love"	Jim Collins, Craig Wiseman	3:36
2.	"It's All Coming Back to Me Now"	Jon Mabe, Patrick Matthews, Jim McCormick	3:30
3.	"My Life"	Catt Gravitt, Gerald O'Brien, Pam Rose	4:21
4.	"If It's Gonna Rain"	Dean Dillon, Scotty Emerick, Donny Kees	3:56
5.	"Time Keeps Slipping Away"	Marc Beeson, Don Rollins, D. Vincent Williams	3:16
6.	"Why Can't I"	Bob DiPiero, Karyn Rochelle	3:49
7.	"A Day in the Life of America"	Melinda Duncan, Jim Femino, Williams	3:59
8.	"Somewhere Dry"	Billy Lawson, Wally Wilson	3:40
9.	"Local Girls"	DiPiero, Rivers Rutherford	3:42
10.	"Every Fire"	Cathy Majeski, John Scott Sherrill	3:34
11.	"Accept My Love"	Glen Clark, Jeff Silbar	4:03

== Personnel ==
- Jamie Brantley – acoustic guitar, electric guitar, background vocals
- Thomas Cain – background vocals
- Melodie Crittenden – background vocals
- Stuart Duncan – baritone ukulele, fiddle
- Rodney Edmondson – drums
- Jason Eskridge – background vocals
- Warren Gowers – bass guitar, background vocals
- Adam Hampton – keyboards, Hammond organ, background vocals
- Rhonda Hampton – background vocals
- Greenwood Hart – congas, acoustic guitar, jews harp, piano
- Jypsi – background vocals on "You Don't Know My Love"
- Shane Keister – clavinet, keyboards, Hammond organ, piano, Wurlitzer
- Brent Mason – electric guitar, gut string guitar
- Ronnie Milsap – lead vocals
- Matt Rovey – background vocals
- John Wesley Ryles – background vocals
- D. Vincent Williams – background vocals
- Lonnie Wilson – drums
- Glenn Worf – bass guitar

== Chart ==
Chart (2006)	Peak position
U.S. Top Country Albums	46

=== Singles ===
Year	Song	US Country
2006	"Local Girls"	54
2006	"You Don't Know My Love"	-
