= Jypsi =

- Origin: Galena, Illinois, U.S.
- Genre: Country
- Years active: 1994–2009
- Label: Arista Nashville
- Past members: Amber-Dawn Rische; Frank Rische; Lillie Mae Rische; Scarlett Rische

Jypsi (pronounced "gypsy") was an American country music vocal group composed of four siblings, all with the surname Rische: Amber-Dawn (fiddle, vocals), Frank (guitar, vocals), Lillie Mae (lead vocals), and Scarlett (mandolin, electric mandolin). Signed to Arista Nashville in 2007, the group has released three singles, including "I Don't Love You Like That", which reached number 38 on the U.S. country singles charts that year. The band also released its self-titled debut album in May 2008.

== History ==
Jypsi was formed in 1994 in Galena, Illinois by sisters Amber-Dawn, Lillie Mae, and Scarlett Rische, along with their brother, Frank. After several years of playing locally, the band was discovered in 2000 by Cowboy Jack Clement, a record producer from Nashville, Tennessee. In 2007, they were signed to Arista Nashville. In late 2007, the group began work on its debut album as Jypsi. The group's first single was entitled "Love Is a Drug", but it did not chart and was not put on the album. "I Don't Love You Like That," its follow-up, reached a peak of 38 on the Billboard Hot Country Songs charts.

Jypsi's self-titled debut album was released in May 2008 as a music download but not as a physical album. This album includes the song "Now That's All Right with Me," previously released by Mandy Barnett on her 1996 self-titled debut. Country Standard Time gave the album a favorable review, with reviewer John Lupton saying, "Though it takes a little while to get it going, their self-titled debut demonstrates that there is indeed some substance to the [attractive] image as well." Lead singer Lillie Mae Rische made a guest appearance on the track "God Knows Who I Am" on Montgomery Gentry's 2008 album Back When I Knew It All.

The group's third single, "Mister Officer," was released in August 2009. It was also made into the band's first music video, directed by Roman White. Bobby Peacock of Roughstock.com said "Lillie Mae Rische's vocals gives a youthful, energetic performance that helps sell the song." Juli Thanki of Engine 145 gave it a thumbs-up, saying "Despite its shortcomings—and there are a few—'Mr. Officer' is bursting at the seams with carefree, youthful exuberance and bright three-part harmony." "Mister Officer" peaked at 52.

After Jypsi broke up, Lillie Mae Rische began recording as a solo artist under the name Lillie Mae.

== Discography ==
=== Jypsi (2008) ===
Jypsi

Studio album by Jypsi
- Released: May 2008
- Genre: Americana/Country
- Label: Arista Nashville
- Producer: Blake Chancey

1. "Now That's All Right with Me" (Kostas, Tony Perez) – 2:47
2. "I Do What I Want" (Bart Hansen) – 2:44
3. "I Don't Love You Like That" (Liz Rose, Stephanie Chapman) – 3:49
4. "You Don't Know What Real Love Is" (Bobby Nicholas) – 4:00
5. "Shame on Me" (Christi Dannemiller, Jim Collins) – 3:21
6. "Stray Dogs and Alley Cats" (Harley Allen) – 3:34
7. "The House of the Rising Sun" (traditional) – 4:21
8. "Free" (Nicholas) – 3:37
9. "Halfway Home Cafe" (Paul Overstreet, Johnny Barranco) – 4:19
10. "First Thing on My Mind" (Nicholas) – 4:33
11. "Kandi Kitchen" (Frank Carter Rische) – 5:26

=== Singles ===
| Year | Single | Peak positions | Album |
| Year | Single | US Country | Album |
|---|---|---|---|
| 2007 | "Love Is a Drug" | — | —N/a |
| 2008 | "I Don't Love You Like That" | 38 | Jypsi |
| 2009 | "Mister Officer" | 52 | —N/a |
"—" denotes releases that did not chart

=== Guest singles ===
| Year | Single | Artist | Peak positions | Album |
| Year | Single | Artist | US Country | Album |
|---|---|---|---|---|
| 2006 | "You Don't Know My Love" | Ronnie Milsap | — | My Life |
"—" denotes releases that did not chart

=== Music videos ===
| Year | Video | Director |
|---|---|---|
| 2009 | "Mister Officer" | Roman White |
