= Prisoner of the Highway =

Single by Ronnie Milsap

from the album One More Try for Love
- B-side: "She Loves My Car"
- Released: September 1, 1984
- Length: 4:13
- Label: RCA Victor
- Songwriter: Mike Reid
- Producers: Ronnie Milsap, Rob Galbraith

Ronnie Milsap singles chronology
| "Still Losing You" (1984) | "Prisoner of the Highway" (1984) | "She Keeps the Home Fires Burning" (1985) |

"Prisoner of the Highway" is a song written by Mike Reid, and recorded by the American country music singer Ronnie Milsap. It was released in September 1984 as the second single from the album One More Try for Love. The song was included on Milsap's Greatest Hits Vol. 3 released in 1992.

== Content ==
The song tells the story of a truck driver who is enticed, but also "imprisoned", by the highway. Yet he somehow finds freedom behind the wheel.

== Success and reception ==
The song was a major Top 10 hit on the Billboard magazine Hot Country Songs charts, peaking at No. 6.

Mark Wills recorded a cover of the song, as a duet with Milsap, on Wills's 2003 album And the Crowd Goes Wild.

== Chart positions ==
| Chart (1984) | Peak position |
|---|---|
| U.S. Billboard Hot Country Singles & Tracks | 6 |
| Canadian RPM Country Tracks | 9 |
