= Just for a Thrill =

Studio album by Ronnie Milsap
- Released: May 18, 2004
- Studio: Capitol Studios (Hollywood, California)
- Genre: Country
- Length: 49:49
- Label: Image Entertainment
- Producer: Rob Galbraith; Ronnie Milsap; Jerry Sharell

Ronnie Milsap chronology
The Ultimate Ronnie Milsap (2004)	Just for a Thrill (2004)	My Life (2006)

Professional ratings
Review scores
Source	Rating
Allmusic	4/5 stars

Just for a Thrill is the twenty-second studio album of country music artist Ronnie Milsap. It was released in 2004 under Image Records, his first for the label. The album consisted of fourteen recordings of pop and jazz standards.

The record peaked at number 11 on Top Jazz Albums, Milsap's first appearance on the chart. Allmusic gave the album four stars, commenting that "Milsap's voice is in great shape." The review cited the tracks, "Bewitched, Bothered and Bewildered," "Haunted Heart," "Ev'ry Time We Say Goodbye," "In the Wee Small Hours of the Morning," and "Since I Fell for You" as being "complemented" by Milsap's "vocals and piano."

== Track listing ==
1. "I Don't Want Nobody to Have My Love But You" (Buddy Johnson) – 2:45
2. "Teach Me Tonight" (Sammy Cahn, Gene De Paul) – 4:08
3. "Cry" (Churchill Kohlman) – 3:53
4. "Make Believe Medley" – 3:24
  - "Make Believe" (Oscar Hammerstein II)
  - "I'm Gonna Sit Right Down and Write Myself a Letter" (Fred E. Ahlert, Joe Young)
5. "Bewitched, Bothered and Bewildered" – (Lorenz Hart, Richard Rodgers) – 3:46
6. "Haunted Heart" (Howard Dietz, Arthur Schwartz) – 2:54
7. "But I Do" (Paul Gayten, Robert Guidry) – 4:04
8. "Since I Fell for You" (Johnson) – 4:19
9. "Ev'ry Time We Say Goodbye" (Cole Porter) – 4:04
10. "But Not for Me" (George Gershwin, Ira Gershwin) – 2:21
11. "In the Wee Small Hours of the Morning" (Bob Hilliard, David Mann) – 3:27
12. "Just for a Thrill" (Lil Hardin Armstrong, Don Raye) – 3:37
13. "My Funny Valentine" (Hart, Lor Hart, Rodgers) – 3:40
14. "My Babe" (Willie Dixon) – 3:27

== Cover versions ==
In 2013, the renowned Spanish actress and singer Natalia Dicenta released a version of the song "Just for a Thrill" on her album Colours.

== Personnel ==
- James Atkinson - french horn
- Marilyn Baker - viola
- Rick Baptist - trumpet
- Wayne Bergeson - trumpet
- Charlie Bisharat - violin
- George Bohanon - trombone
- Tom Boyd - oboe
- Jamie Brantley - acoustic guitar
- Vanessa Brown - percussion
- Dennis Budimir - acoustic guitar
- Becky Bunnell - violin
- Pete Christlien - tenor saxophone
- Gene Cipriano - baritone saxophone
- Larry Corbett - cello
- Joel Derouin - violin
- Assa Drori - violin
- Ernest Ehrhardt - cello
- Charles Everett - violin
- Dominick Farinacci - trumpet
- Armen Garabedian - violin
- Berj Garabedian - violin
- Pamela Goldsmith - viola
- Gary Grant - trumpet
- Clayton Haslop - violin
- Dan Higgins - soprano saxophone
- David Hungate - bass guitar
- Marilyn Johnson - french horn
- Patricia Johnson - violin
- Anne Karam - cello
- Dan Kelly - french horn
- Paul Leim - drums
- Gayle Levant - harp
- Charles Loper - trombone
- Warren Luening - flugelhorn, trumpet
- Bob Mann - electric guitar
- Catherine Styron Marx - piano
- Ronnie Milsap - Fender Rhodes, piano, electric piano, lead vocals
- Jennifer Munday - violin
- Richard "Dick" Nash - trombone
- Dean Parks - electric guitar
- James Ross - viola
- Don Shelton - alto saxophone
- Harry Shirinian - viola
- Dan Smith - cello
- Phillip Teele - trombone
- Richard Todd - french horn
- Mari Tsumura - violin
- Miwako Watanabe - violin
- George Young - tenor saxophone

== Chart ==
Chart (2004)	Peak position
U.S. Top Country Albums	-
U.S. Top Jazz Albums	11
