= True Believer (Ronnie Milsap album) =

Studio album by Ronnie Milsap
- Released: June 7, 1993
- Genre: Country
- Length: 43:12
- Label: Liberty
- Producers: Rob Galbraith Ronnie Milsap

Ronnie Milsap chronology
Greatest Hits, Vol. 3 (1991)	True Believer (1993)	The Essential Ronnie Milsap (1995)

Professional ratings
Review scores
Source	Rating
Allmusic	link

True Believer is the twenty-first studio album by country music artist Ronnie Milsap. It was released in 1993, his first for Liberty Records. The album produced two singles, the title track, which peaked at #30 on country charts and "I'm Playing for You," which did not chart.

The album did not chart, his first to do so since his 1971 self-named debut album. Allmusic praised the title track, stating that the record would have been one "to reckon with" if the rest of the tracks "had the energy" of the title song.

== Track listing ==
No.	Title	Writer(s)	Length
1.	"Desire"	Walt Aldridge, Jenny Yates	4:38
2.	"I'm Playing for You"	Lewis Anderson, Keith Stegall	4:17
3.	"Somebody's Gonna Get That Girl"	Marc Beeson, Joanie Chappel-Beeson, Sonny LeMaire	3:52
4.	"Better Off with the Blues"	Donnie Fritts, Delbert McClinton, Gary Nicholson	3:59
5.	"Hos Allen Sequé""		:41
6.	"True Believer"	John Hiatt	4:51
7.	"These Foolish Things"	Harry Link, Holt Marvell, Jack Strachey	3:49
8.	"A Million Years 'Til Then"	Dennis Morgan, Keith Thomas	4:27
9.	"Desperate Man"	Dave Gibson	4:08
10.	"Civil War"	Carol Chase, Cindy Richardson	4:07
11.	"Please Jesus (Send My Baby Home to Me)"	Michael Stewart	4:23

== Production ==
- Rob Galbraith – producer
- Ronnie Milsap – producer
- Mike Clute – recording, mixing
- Keith Odle – recording, mixing, digital editing
- Randy Gardner – recording assistant, mix assistant
- Milan Bogdan – digital editing
- Glenn Meadows – mastering
- Doug Sax – mastering
- Masterfonics (Nashville, Tennessee) – editing and mastering location
- The Mastering Lab (Hollywood, California) – mastering location

== Personnel ==
- Ronnie Milsap – lead vocals, backing vocals, keyboards
- John Barlow Jarvis – keyboards
- Shane Keister – keyboards, synthesizers, programming
- Brian D. Siewart – synthesizers
- Jay Spell – keyboards
- Catherine Styron – keyboards
- Marc Beeson – acoustic guitar
- Mark Casstevens – acoustic guitar
- Bruce Dees – acoustic guitar, electric guitar, backing vocals
- John Hiatt – acoustic guitar
- Biff Watson – acoustic guitar
- Walt Aldridge – electric guitar
- Jamie Brantley – electric guitar, backing vocals
- Larry Byrom – electric guitar
- Dann Huff – electric guitar
- Russ Pahl – electric guitar
- Reggie Young – electric guitar
- John Willis – gut-string guitar (8)
- Dan Dugmore – pedal steel guitar, lap steel guitar
- David Hungate – bass guitar
- Warren Gowers – bass guitar
- Alison Prestwood – bass guitar
- Michael Rhodes – bass guitar
- Bob Wray – bass guitar
- James Ferguson – upright bass
- Darryl Holden – drums
- Kenny Malone – drums
- Lonnie Wilson – drums
- Terry McMillan – percussion, harmonica
- Farrell Morris – percussion
- Sam Levine – saxophones, horn arrangements
- Mike Haynes – trumpets
- Ava Aldridge – backing vocals
- Jana King – backing vocals
- Marie Lewey – backing vocals
- Cindy Richardson-Walker – backing vocals
- Lisa Silver – backing vocals

== Chart ==
Chart (1993)	Peak position
U.S. Top Country Albums	-
U.S. Billboard 200	-

=== Singles ===
Year	Song	US Country
1993	"True Believer"	30
1993	"I'm Playing for You"	-
