= Am I Losing You =

Single by Ronnie Milsap

from the album Out Where the Bright Lights Are Glowing
- B-side: "He'll Have to Go"
- Released: February 1981
- Genre: Country
- Length: 3:39
- Label: RCA Victor
- Songwriter: Jim Reeves
- Producers: Ronnie Milsap, Tom Collins

Ronnie Milsap singles chronology
"Smoky Mountain Rain" (1980)	"Am I Losing You" (1981)	"(There's) No Gettin' Over Me" (1981)

"Am I Losing You" is a 1957 single written and first recorded by American country music artist Jim Reeves. It spent two weeks at number three on the country singles chart. A 1960 re-recording peaked at number eight on the same chart, and number 31 on the Billboard Hot 100; this version was the B-side to the single "I Missed Me", which also peaked at number three on the country chart.

== Notable covers ==
In 1981, Ronnie Milsap covered "Am I Losing You" for his album Out Where the Bright Lights Are Glowing. Milsap's version spent one week at number one on the country chart.

== Charts ==
=== Jim Reeves ===
Chart (1957)	Peak position
U.S. Billboard Hot C&W Sides	3
Chart (1960)	Peak position
U.S. Billboard Hot C&W Sides	8
US Billboard Hot 100	31

=== Ronnie Milsap ===
Chart (1981)	Peak position
US Hot Country Songs (Billboard)	1
Canadian RPM Country Tracks	1
