= One More Try for Love =

Studio album by Ronnie Milsap
- Released: April 30, 1984
- Studios: GroundStar Laboratories and Bullet Recording (Nashville, Tennessee)
- Genre: Country
- Length: 40:50
- Label: RCA Victor
- Producers: Ronnie Milsap; Rob Galbraith

Ronnie Milsap chronology
Keyed Up (1983)	One More Try for Love (1984)	Greatest Hits, Vol. 2 (1985)

Singles from One More Try for Love
- 1. "Still Losing You" Released: May 19, 1984; 2. "Prisoner of the Highway" Released: September 1, 1984

Professional ratings
Review scores
Source	Rating
Allmusic	link

One More Try for Love is the sixteenth studio album by American country music artist Ronnie Milsap, released on April 30, 1984 through RCA Victor. The album produced three singles, including the #1 US Country song "Still Losing You" and "Prisoner of the Highway", which peaked at #6 on the Hot Country Singles chart. "She Loves My Car," which hit #84 on the Billboard Hot 100 and had an accompanying music video (the first of the country music genre to be featured on MTV), featuring Mariska Hargitay, Hervé Villechaize, Rebecca Holden, Britt Ekland, Exene Cervenka and John Doe, was the album's third and final single.

The album reached #10 on Country charts and peaked at #180 on the Billboard 200. Some of tracks were altered electronically including "She Loves My Car" and "Suburbia," which AllMusic described as "tasteful [and] not overdone." It was recorded and assembled using a mix of both analog and digital equipment via the Ampex ATR-100 and Mitsubishi X-80A digital recorder.

On January 25, 2019, the majority of Milsap's catalogue was brought by Craft Recordings, which led it to be digitally reissued despite having its physical copies out of print.

== Commercial performance ==
The album was released in the end of April 1984.

One More Try for Love debuted at number 193 on the Billboard 200 chart on June 2, 1984. It later peaked at number 180, but its performance in the comprehensive Billboard 200 was stalled, which ultimately charted for three weeks in the chart. Compared to his previous release, Keyed Up had reached number 36 on the Billboard 200 showed Milsap's sales to steadily decline throughout the rest of the decade. It however peaked at number 10 inside the US Top Country Albums chart, which was Milsap's lowest charting performance in the country chart at that time, but it was his 14th consecutive streak of having his albums that peaked at the top ten inside that chart.

In Canada, it debuted at number seven on the Canadian RPM country chart on August 4, 1984. It later stalled at number two behind Don Williams's Cafe Carolina on August 18.

== Track listing ==
No.	Title	Writer(s)	Length
1.	"One More Try for Love"	Robert Byrne, Brandon Barnes	4:19
2.	"She Loves My Car"	Roy Freeland, Bill LaBounty	3:59
3.	"Still Losing You"	Mike Reid	5:17
4.	"Suburbia"	Dan Williams	3:57
5.	"Prisoner of the Highway"	Reid	4:13
6.	"She's Always in Love"	Reid, Williams, Michael Stewart	4:34
7.	"I Might Have Said"	Reid	4:09
8.	"I Guess I Just Missed You"	Walt Aldridge, Tom Brasfield	3:24
9.	"I'll Take Care of You"	Archie Jordan, Glenn Sutton	3:27
10.	"Night by Night" (duet with Lisa Silver)	Quentin Powers, Susan Longacre, Gary Prim	3:25

== Personnel ==
- Ronnie Milsap – vocals, backing vocals, keyboards, synthesizers
- Clayton Ivey – keyboards
- Shane Keister – keyboards, synthesizers, synthesizer drum programming
- Bruce Dees – guitars, electric guitar solos, backing vocals
- Jon Goin – guitars
- John Willis – acoustic guitar solo
- Warren Gowers – bass
- David Hungate – bass
- Larrie Londin – drums
- James Stroud – drums
- Kyle Lehning – synthesizer drum programming
- The Nashville String Machine – strings
- Bergen White – string arrangements
- Carl Gorodetzky – concertmaster
- Lisa Silver – backing vocals, vocals (10)

Additional musicians

- Mitch Humphries
- Archie Jordan
- Don Roth
- John Willis
- Roger Hawkins
- Farrell Morris
- Jim Horn
- Dan Williams

=== Production ===
- Ron Galbraith – producer
- Ronnie Milsap – producer
- Ben Harris – engineer
- Kyle Lehning – engineer
- Scott Hendricks – string engineer
- Hogan Entertainment Design – art direction
- David Hogan – design
- Jim Osborn – design
- Mark Tucker – photography
- Marie Shreve-Slayton – hair, make-up

== Chart performance ==
=== Weekly charts ===
Chart (1984)	Peak position
Canadian Country Albums (RPM)	2
US Billboard 200	180
US Top Country Albums (Billboard)	10

=== Year-end charts ===
Chart (1984)	Position
US Top Country Albums (Billboard)	41

=== Singles ===
Year	Single	Peak chart positions			
Year	Single	US Country	US	US AC	CAN Country
1984	"Still Losing You"	1	—	29	1
1984	"Prisoner of the Highway"	6	—	—	9
1984	"She Loves My Car"	—	84	—	—

== Release history ==
Region	Date	Edition(s)	Format(s)	Label(s)	Ref.
North America	April 30, 1984	Standard	LP; Cassette; CD	RCA Victor	
Japan	September 21, 1984	Standard	LP	RCA Victor	
Worldwide	January 25, 2019	Digital Reissue	Digital download; streaming	Craft Recordings; UMG	
