= Keyed Up =

Studio album by Ronnie Milsap
- Released: March 31, 1983
- Studios: GroundStar Laboratories (Nashville, Tennessee)
- Genre: Country
- Length: 40:17
- Label: RCA
- Producers: Ronnie Milsap; Tom Collins

Ronnie Milsap chronology
Inside (1982)	Keyed Up (1983)	One More Try for Love (1984)

Singles from Keyed Up
- 1. "Stranger in My House/Is It Over" Released: April 2, 1983; 2. "Don't You Know How Much I Love You" Released: July 1983; 3. "Show Her" Released: October 1983

Keyed Up is the fifteenth studio album by American country music artist Ronnie Milsap, released in 1983. It featured the No. 5 country chart hit "Stranger in My House", plus the No. 1 country hits "Don't You Know How Much I Love You", "Show Her" and "Is It Over". The song "Is It Over" experienced a major surge in popularity in the Philippines that always requested and played in different radio stations. It was also a revival song by the "Philippines' Queen of Soul" Jaya, which include this song to her album Cool Change, released in 2007.

== Track listing ==
No.	Title	Writer(s)	Length
1.	"Stranger in My House"	Mike Reid	4:11
2.	"Show Her"	Reid	3:58
3.	"Don't Your Mem'ry Ever Sleep at Night"	Steve Dean, Randy Hatch	3:23
4.	"Watch Out for the Other Guy"	Robert Byrne, Alan Schulman	3:53
5.	"Redneck at Heart"	Kye Fleming, Dennis Morgan	3:28
6.	"Don't You Know How Much I Love You"	Michael Stewart, Dan Williams	3:26
7.	"Feelings Change"	Fleming, Morgan	3:30
8.	"Like Children I Have Known"	Jim Daddario, Don Pfrimmer	4:04
9.	"Is It Over"	Reid, Charles Quillen	3:56
10.	"We're Here to Love"	Reid, Troy Seals	5:55

== Personnel ==
- Ronnie Milsap – lead vocals, backing vocals, keyboards, synthesizers
- David Briggs – keyboards
- Shane Keister – keyboards, synthesizers
- Bobby Ogdin – keyboards
- Larry Byrom – electric guitar
- Jimmy Capps – acoustic guitar
- Bruce Dees – electric guitar, backing vocals
- Jon Goin – electric guitar
- Fred Newell – electric guitar
- Jack Watkins– acoustic guitar
- Sonny Garrish – steel guitar
- Warren Gowers – bass
- David Hungate – bass
- Roger Hawkins – drums
- Larrie Londin – drums
- James Stroud – drums
- The Nashville String Machine – strings (2, 10)
- Bergen White – string arrangements (2, 10)
- The Nashville Horn Works – horns (5, 6)
- Robert Byrne – backing vocals
- The Cherry Sisters (Sherri Huffman, Lisa Silver and Diane Tidwell) – backing vocals
- Dan Seals – backing vocals
- Suzy Storm – backing vocals
- Marie Tomlinson – backing vocals
- Barbara Wyrick – backing vocals

=== Production ===
- Tom Collins – producer
- Ronnie Milsap – producer
- Ben Harris – recording
- Kyle Lehning – recording
- John Eberle – mastering at Nashville Record Productions (Nashville, Tennessee)
- Hogan Entertainment Design – art direction
- Mark Tucker – photography
- Marie Shreve-Slayton – hair, make-up

== Chart performance ==
Chart performance for Keyed Up
Chart (1983)	Peak position
US Top Country Albums (Billboard)	2
US Billboard 200	36
