= There's No Gettin' Over Me (album) =

Studio album by Ronnie Milsap
- Released: August 1981
- Studios: GroundStar Laboratories (Nashville, Tennessee)
- Genre: Country
- Length: 34:23
- Label: RCA Victor
- Producers: Ronnie Milsap; Tom Collins

Ronnie Milsap chronology
| Out Where the Bright Lights Are Glowing (1981) | There's No Gettin' Over Me (1981) | Inside (1982) |

Singles from There's No Gettin' Over Me
- 1. "(There's) No Gettin' Over Me" Released: June 12, 1981; 2. "I Wouldn't Have Missed It for the World" Released: October 1981

Professional ratings
Review scores
| Source | Rating |
|---|---|
| Allmusic | 4/5 stars |

There's No Gettin' Over Me is the thirteenth studio album by American country music artist Ronnie Milsap, released in 1981 by RCA Records. The album produced two hits that peaked at number one for Milsap, including the title track, which also peaked at number two on the Adult Contemporary chart and number five on the Billboard Hot 100. "I Wouldn't Have Missed It For the World," also reached number 20 and number three on the Billboard Hot 100 and Adult Contemporary charts, respectively.

There's No Gettin' Over Me reached at top of Country album charts and broke the Top 40 of the Billboard 200, peaking at number 31. It was ultimately certified as Gold by the Recording Industry Association of America (RIAA). Allmusic described the album as the "perfect example of what Milsap was about in his middle period. There's humility in his confidence and a genuine empathy in his croon. Yeah, it's slick, and even schlocky in places...but it's also terrific." The publication focused on the track "I Wouldn't Have Missed It For the World," which it describes as "urban cowboy country music in its purest essence."

On January 25, 2019, the album was digitally reissued through Craft Recordings and was later physically reissued on November 2024 after being out of print for over 35 years.

== Track listing ==
| No. | Title | Writer(s) | Length |
|---|---|---|---|
| 1. | "Everywhere I Turn (There's Your Memory)" | Archie Jordan, Naomi Martin | 3:14 |
| 2. | "(There's) No Gettin' Over Me" | Walt Aldridge, Tom Brasfield | 3:15 |
| 3. | "It's All I Can Do" | Jordan, Richard Leigh | 3:33 |
| 4. | "Two Hearts Don't Always Make a Pair" | Jim Rushing, Byron Walls | 3:06 |
| 5. | "Jesus Is Your Ticket to Heaven" | Jordan | 3:11 |
| 6. | "I Wouldn't Have Missed It for the World" | Kye Fleming, Dennis Morgan, Charles Quillen | 3:32 |
| 7. | "Too Big for Words" | Suzy Storm, Barbara Wyrick | 3:25 |
| 8. | "It Happens Every Time (I Think of You)" | Jordan | 2:49 |
| 9. | "It's Written All Over Your Face" | Brasfield, Robert Byrne | 3:44 |
| 10. | "I Live My Whole Life at Night" | Quillen, John Schweers | 3:57 |

== Personnel ==
- Ronnie Milsap – lead vocals, backing vocals, acoustic piano, synthesizers
- David Briggs – electric piano
- Shane Keister – electric piano, synthesizers
- Richard Ripani – synthesizers
- Bobby Wood – organ
- Jimmy Capps – rhythm guitar
- Jack Watkins – rhythm guitar, electric guitar
- Pete Bordonali – electric guitar
- Bruce Dees – electric guitar, backing vocals
- Brent Rowan – electric guitar
- Bruce Brooks – steel guitar
- Sonny Garrish – steel guitar
- John Hughey – steel guitar
- Warren Gowers – bass guitar
- Buster Phillips – drums
- Charlie McCoy – vibraphone, harmonica
- Ronald Eades – saxophones
- Cindy Reynolds-Wyatt – harp
- Sheldon Kurland Strings – strings (1, 3, 7–9)
- Bergen White – string arrangements (1, 3, 7–9)
- The Lea Jane Singers (Lea Jane Berinati, Janie Fricke and Ginger Holladay) – backing vocals (1)
- Suzy Storm – backing vocals
- Marie Tomlinson – backing vocals
- Barbara Wyrick – backing vocals

=== Production ===
- Tom Collins – producer
- Ronnie Milsap – producer
- Les Ladd – engineer
- Ben Harris – assistant engineer
- Denny Purcell – mastering at Woodland Sound Studios (Nashville, Tennessee)
- David Hogan – art direction
- Norman Seeff – photography

== Charts ==
=== Album ===
| Chart (1981) | Peak position |
|---|---|
| U.S. Billboard Top Country Albums | 1 |
| U.S. Billboard 200 | 31 |

=== Singles ===
| Year | Single | Peak chart positions | | | | | |
| Year | Single | US Country | US | US AC | CAN Country | CAN | CAN AC |
|---|---|---|---|---|---|---|---|
| 1981 | "(There's) No Gettin' Over Me" | 1 | 5 | 2 | 1 | 21 | 1 |
| 1981 | "I Wouldn't Have Missed It for the World" | 1 | 20 | 3 | 1 | — | 1 |

== Certifications ==
| Region | Certification | Certified units/sales |
|---|---|---|
| United States (RIAA) | Gold | 500,000^{^} |
^{^} Shipments figures based on certification alone.
