= Heart and Soul (Ronnie Milsap album) =

Studio album by Ronnie Milsap
- Released: 1987
- Studios: GroundStar Laboratories (Nashville, Tennessee)
- Genre: Country
- Length: 41:21
- Label: RCA Victor
- Producers: Rob Galbraith; Kyle Lehning; Ronnie Milsap

Ronnie Milsap chronology
| Christmas with Ronnie Milsap (1986) | Heart and Soul (1987) | Stranger Things Have Happened (1989) |

Singles from Heart and Soul
- 1. "Snap Your Fingers" Released: March 1987; 2. "Make No Mistake, She's Mine" Released: June 1987; 3. "Where Do the Nights Go" Released: September 1987; 4. "Old Folks" Released: March 5, 1988; 5. "Button Off My Shirt" Released: July 23, 1988

Professional ratings
Review scores
| Source | Rating |
|---|---|
| Allmusic | link |

Heart and Soul is the eighteenth studio album by American country music artist Ronnie Milsap, released in 1987. The album produced four singles, three of which claimed the top spot on the Billboard country singles chart" "Snap Your Fingers"; "Make No Mistake, She's Mine," a duet with Kenny Rogers; and "Where Do the Nights Go." Two other singles, "Old Folks," a duet with Mike Reid; and "Button Off My Shirt" peaked at #2 and #4 respectively on the country charts. "Button Off My Shirt" was also recorded that same year by Mike + The Mechanics & Ace vocalist Paul Carrack for his solo album One Good Reason.

Heart & Soul reached #13 on Country album charts. Allmusic described it as "one of Milsap's more diverse efforts."

== Track listing ==
| No. | Title | Writer(s) | Length |
|---|---|---|---|
| 1. | "Snap Your Fingers" | Grady Martin, Alex Zanetis | 3:03 |
| 2. | "Button Off My Shirt" | Billy Livsey, Graham Lyle | 3:54 |
| 3. | "Where Do the Nights Go" | Rory Bourke, Mike Reid | 4:32 |
| 4. | "The Truth Is, I've Been Known to Lie" | Don Miller, Jamey Whiting | 3:43 |
| 5. | "Make No Mistake, She's Mine" (duet with Kenny Rogers) | Kim Carnes | 3:57 |
| 6. | "One Night" | Reid, Troy Seals | 4:59 |
| 7. | "Somebody Like You" | Randy Goodrum, Steve Lukather | 4:10 |
| 8. | "This Time Last Year" | Tim Nichols, Jon Vezner | 4:29 |
| 9. | "Earthquake" | Thomas Cain, Bob DiPiero | 4:23 |
| 10. | "Old Folks" (duet with Mike Reid) | Reid | 4:02 |

== Personnel ==
- Ronnie Milsap – vocals, backing vocals, keyboards, electric piano (5)
- Mitch Humphries – keyboards
- Clayton Ivey – keyboards, acoustic piano (5)
- Shane Keister – keyboards, synthesizer sequencing, keyboard bass, drum programming
- Hargus "Pig" Robbins – keyboards
- Jay Spell – keyboards
- Mark Casstevens – acoustic guitar
- Don Potter – acoustic guitar
- Chet Atkins – acoustic guitar (3)
- Larry Byrom – electric guitar
- Jon Goin – electric guitar
- Bruce Dees – electric guitar (5), backing vocals
- Steve Lukather – electric guitar (7)
- Jerry Douglas – dobro (1)
- Lloyd Green – steel guitar
- Bob Wray – bass (1–4, 6–9)
- David Hungate – bass (5)
- Larrie Londin – drums
- Tom Roady – percussion
- Terry McMillan – harmonica
- Jim Horn – saxophone
- Bergen White – horn arrangements
- David T. Clydesdale – string arrangements (5)
- Sherilyn Huffman – backing vocals
- Lisa Silver – backing vocals
- Suzy Storm – backing vocals
- Diane Tidwell – backing vocals
- Marie Tomlinson – backing vocals
- Barbara Wyrick – backing vocals
- Kenny Rogers – vocals (5)
- Mike Reid – vocals (10)

=== Production ===
- Ronnie Milsap – producer (1–4, 6–9)
- Rob Galbraith – producer
- Kyle Lehning – producer, engineer
- Joe Bogan – engineer
- Ben Harris – engineer
- Randy Gardner – assistant engineer
- Doug Sax – mastering at The Mastering Lab (Hollywood, California)
- Mary Hamilton – art direction
- Dennas Davis – design, illustration

== Chart performance ==
=== Album ===
| Chart (1987) | Peak position |
|---|---|
| U.S. Billboard Top Country Albums | 13 |

=== Singles ===
| Year | Single | Peak chart positions | | |
| Year | Single | US Country | US AC | CAN Country |
|---|---|---|---|---|
| 1987 | "Snap Your Fingers" | 1 | — | 1 |
| 1987 | "Make No Mistake, She's Mine" (with Kenny Rogers) | 1 | 42 | 1 |
| 1987 | "Where Do the Nights Go" | 1 | — | 1 |
| 1988 | "Old Folks" (with Mike Reid) | 2 | — | 12 |
| 1988 | "Button Off My Shirt" | 4 | — | * |
