= Milsap Magic =

Studio album by Ronnie Milsap
- Released: April 5, 1980
- Recorded: 1979
- Studios: GroundStar Laboratories (Nashville, Tennessee)
- Genre: Country
- Length: 37:34
- Label: RCA Victor
- Producers: Ronnie Milsap; Rob Galbraith

Ronnie Milsap chronology
Images (1979)	Milsap Magic (1980)	Greatest Hits (1980)

Singles from Milsap Magic
- 1. "Why Don't You Spend the Night" Released: January 12, 1980; 2. "My Heart" Released: April 12, 1980

Milsap Magic is the eleventh studio album by American country music artist Ronnie Milsap, released in 1980 by RCA Records. The two A-side singles from the album, "Why Don't You Spend the Night" and "My Heart", reached No. 1 on the Billboard country chart, and two B-sides, "Silent Night (After the Fight)" and "Misery Loves Company", also received airplay as double-sided singles. The song "If You Don't Want Me To", which was later used as a B-side in 1987 and 1989, was then issued as the first single for Milsap's 2011 Country Again album, in its original production (not a re-recording) but as a longer version with an extra chorus inserted before the instrumental fade.

== Track listing ==
No.	Title	Writer(s)	Length
1.	"Why Don't You Spend the Night"	Bob McDill	4:08
2.	"She Thinks I Still Care"	Dickey Lee, Steve Duffy	3:01
3.	"My Heart"	Don Pfrimmer, Charles Quillen	2:39
4.	"Silent Night (After the Fight)"	John Schweers	3:17
5.	"It's a Beautiful Thing"	Keith Thomas	4:55
6.	"Misery Loves Company"	Jerry Reed	4:38
7.	"I Let Myself Believe"	Barry Manilow, Bruce Sussman, Jack Feldman	3:40
8.	"If You Don't Want Me To"	Jimmie Lee Sloas, Robert White Johnson	3:42
9.	"What's One More Time"	Richard Leigh	2:51
10.	"Still in Love with You"	Thomas	3:58

== Personnel ==
- Ronnie Milsap – lead vocals, backing vocals, keyboards, percussion
- Beegie Adair – keyboards
- David Briggs – keyboards
- Bobby Ogdin – keyboards
- Hargus "Pig" Robbins – keyboards
- Keith Thomas – keyboards
- Bobby Wood – keyboards
- Pete Bordonali – electric guitars
- Jimmy Capps – acoustic guitar
- Steve Chapman – acoustic guitar
- Bruce Dees – acoustic guitar, electric guitars, backing vocals
- Jack Watkins – acoustic guitar
- Reggie Young – electric guitars
- Hal Rugg – steel guitar
- Warren Gowers – bass
- Mike Leech – bass
- Bob Moore – bass
- Kenny Buttrey – drums
- Rick Connell – drums
- Larrie Londin – drums
- Kenny Malone – drums, percussion
- Buster Phillips – drums
- Farrell Morris – percussion
- Charlie McCoy – vibraphone, harmonica
- Bergen White – horn and string arrangements
- Sheldon Kurland Strings – strings
- The Lea Jane Singers – backing vocals
- The Shari Kramer Singers – backing vocals

=== Production ===
- Rob Galbraith – producer
- Ronnie Milsap – producer, mixing
- Ben Harris – recording, mixing
- Bill Harris – recording
- Danny Hilley – recording
- Don Wagner – recording
- Denny Purcell – mastering at Woodland Mastering (Nashville, Tennessee)
- Mike Doud – art direction, design
- Mary Francis – design
- Beverly Parker – photography

== Charts ==
=== Weekly charts ===
Chart (1980)	Peak position
US Billboard 200	137
US Top Country Albums (Billboard)	3

=== Year-end charts ===
Chart (1980)	Position
US Top Country Albums (Billboard)	30
