= Nobody Likes Sad Songs =

Single by Ronnie Milsap

from the album Images
- B-side: "Just Because It Feels Good"
- Released: April 28, 1979
- Genre: Country
- Length: 4:04
- Label: RCA Victor
- Songwriters: Bob McDill, Wayland Holyfield
- Producers: Ronnie Milsap, Tom Collins

Ronnie Milsap singles chronology
| "Back on My Mind Again" (1979) | "Nobody Likes Sad Songs" (1979) | "In No Time at All" (1979) |

"Nobody Likes Sad Songs" is a song written by Bob McDill and Wayland Holyfield, and recorded by American country music artist Ronnie Milsap. It was released in April 1979 as the first single from the album Images. The song was Milsap's 12th number one on the country chart. The single stayed at number one for a single week and spent a total of 12 weeks on the country chart.

== Content ==
The song is told from the perspective of a once-successful performer, who laments about his current lack of success and appeal to audiences because he sings "sad" songs. He refers to his past successes, including his ability to entertain large crowds and repertoire of mainly uptempo, "happy" songs. However, his personal life is anything but happy, and it affects his performing style; he soon begins performing only heartbreak songs, songs he quickly finds his fans don't want to hear. His fans soon begin alienating him, and soon nobody is coming to his shows. Worse, when he tries to rekindle his success by performing his previous "happy" songs, he finds he is unable to credibly do so because of his personal heartbreak.

Later, the performer's tour manager contacts him and announces he is dropping him from the tour. He admonishes him: "What happened son, you had it made?/Why'd you change the way you played?"

== Charts ==
=== Weekly charts ===
| Chart (1979) | Peak position |
|---|---|
| US Hot Country Songs (Billboard) | 1 |
| Canadian RPM Country Tracks | 1 |

=== Year-end charts ===
| Chart (1979) | Position |
|---|---|
| US Hot Country Songs (Billboard) | 12 |
