= Images (Ronnie Milsap album) =

Studio album by Ronnie Milsap
- Released: June 23, 1979
- Genre: Country
- Length: 39:11
- Label: RCA Victor
- Producers: Ronnie Milsap, Tom Collins

Ronnie Milsap chronology
Only One Love in My Life (1978)	Images (1979)	Milsap Magic (1980)

Singles from Images
- 1. "Nobody Likes Sad Songs" Released: April 28, 1979; 2. "In No Time at All" Released: August 18, 1979

Professional ratings
Review scores
Source	Rating
AllMusic	link

Images is the tenth studio album by American country music singer Ronnie Milsap, released in 1979 by RCA Records. The first single to be released from the album was "Nobody Likes Sad Songs". It would become Ronnie Milsap's twelfth number one on the country chart. "In No Time at All" was released in August 1979 as the second single from the album. The song reached number 6 on the Billboard Hot Country Singles chart. The flip side track from the 45 rpm, "Get It Up", a disco-styled track also charted independently on the pop charts.

== Track listing ==
No.	Title	Writer(s)	Length
1.	"Nobody Likes Sad Songs"	Bob McDill, Wayland Holyfield	4:03
2.	"Keep the Night Away"	Roger Bowling, Larry Butler	3:11
3.	"I Really Don't Want to Know"	Howard Barnes, Don Robertson	3:13
4.	"Just Because It Feels Good"	McDill, Holyfield	3:43
5.	"You Don't Look for Love"	Tim Henson	5:14
6.	"Hi-Heel Sneakers"	Robert Higginbotham	4:56
7.	"In No Time at All"	Richard Leigh, Archie Jordan	3:45
8.	"Delta Queen"	Kye Fleming, Dennis Morgan	2:41
9.	"All Good Things Don't Have to End"	Robert Byrne, Tom Brasfield	3:06
10.	"Get It Up"	Byrne, Brasfield	5:19

== Production ==
- Produced By Ronnie Milsap, Tom Collins
- Engineers: Benny Harris, Travis Turk

== Personnel ==
- Drums: Hayward Bishop, Roger Clark, Larrie Londin, Kenny Malone
- Percussion: Charlie McCoy, Farrell Morris
- Vibraphone: Charlie McCoy
- Bass guitar: Warren Gowers, Mike Leech, Joe Osborn
- Keyboards: David Briggs, Clayton Ivey, Ronnie Milsap, Bobby Ogdin, Hargus "Pig" Robbins, Bobby Wood
- Acoustic Guitar: Jimmy Capps
- Electric guitar: Pete Bordonali, Robert Byrne, Bruce Dees, Reggie Young
- Steel Guitar: Lloyd Green
- Harmonica: Charlie McCoy
- Strings: The Sheldon Kurland Strings; arranged by D. Bergen White
- Harp: Cindy Reynolds
- Lead Vocals: Ronnie Milsap
- Background Vocals: The Lea Jane Singers
