= Hugh Moffatt (singer) =

American country singer and songwriter (born 1948)

Hugh Moffatt (born November 3, 1948) is an American country singer and songwriter. In the 1970s and 1980s several artists made hits out of his songs. He has also released critically acclaimed albums of his own.

== Beginnings ==
He was born in Fort Worth, Texas, United States. In his youth, Moffatt learned classical piano and jazz trumpet and was a member of his high school band. Despite early inclinations toward country music, while at Rice University Moffatt learned guitar and turned toward jazz and blues. After graduation, he moved to Austin, Texas and had planned to move to Washington, D.C., but a visit to the Grand Ole Opry in Nashville, Tennessee in 1973 renewed his old passion for country music, and he stayed there to seek a career in that genre.

== Career ==
Moffatt first worked as a songwriter, in emulation of Kris Kristofferson. Success first came when Ronnie Milsap's recording of "Just in Case" peaked at No. 5 on the Billboard country chart. In 1977, he signed a record deal with Mercury and released two unsuccessful singles, and then refocused on songwriting.

In 1980, Moffatt formed Ratz with Wade McCurdy, John Dietrich, Michael Bonagura and his wife. They released the self-financed debut Puttin' on the Ratz in 1984. Two years later he released a solo album, Loving You, which he followed up in 1989 with Troubador, often considered today as his best work. Together with his sister, the country singer Katy Moffatt, he released 1992's Dance Me Outside. He has continued to record and release albums well into the new millennium. Johnny Cash recorded Moffatt's "Rose of My Heart" shortly before his death. The song was released on Cash's album, American V: A Hundred Highways.

Moffatt and Michael Ching, the Artistic Director of Opera Memphis, premiered their first full-length opera in 2003 with the University of Missouri Show-Me Opera. The opera, entitled Corps of Discovery, follows the journeys of Lewis and Clark from New Orleans to the Pacific Northwest and back. Moffatt and Ching have collaborated on two one-act operas that have been performed across the country; King of the Clouds, commissioned by Dayton Opera, follows the story and dreams of the future of the son of an alcoholic mother. Out of the Rain follows the life of a group of friends and society's relationship and struggle with AIDS. In 2010, they again collaborated on a new English translation of Gluck's "Orfeo ed Eurydice" for Opera Memphis.

In 2024, he released a single with "Till the Morning Comes" together with Jonas Fjeld, a song they had written together as early as 1990 when Norwegian Steinar Albrigtsen released it on his album Alone Too Long.

== Personal life ==
Moffatt is the brother of singer-songwriter Katy Moffatt. He was married to songwriter Pebe Sebert, with whom he wrote "Old Flames Can't Hold a Candle to You", in 1977, but the couple separated in 1984. They have one son, Lagan Blue Sebert, a video and documentary film producer living in New York City. Sebert is also the mother of pop star Kesha and for this reason Moffatt is sometimes assumed to be the father of Kesha, but he is not. Moffatt says, "I have enormous respect for Kesha. I admire her music, her talent, her work ethic, and the fact that she has clearly established herself as a voice of her generation. I would be proud to be her father, but I do not have that honor." Since 1987, Moffatt has been married to Mary Vaughan, formerly an elementary and Montessori pre-school teacher, now retired. They live in Nashville and have two children, Corianna Moffatt, an actor, director, and playwright living in Boston, Massachusetts, and Greyson Moffatt, a math and engineering student living in Nashville.

== Albums ==
- 1987 Loving You Philo
- 1989 Troubadour Philo
- 1992 Dance Me Outside Philo
- 1995 Wognum Sessions Strictly Country
- 1996 The Life of a Minor Poet Watermelon
- 2003 Ghosts of the Music Brambus
- 2003 Live and Alone Brambus
- 2006 Songs From the Back of the Church SOHL
- 2013 Only Along For the Ride SOHL
