= Cowboys and Clowns =

Single by Ronnie Milsap

from the album Bronco Billy (soundtrack)
- B-side: "Misery Loves Company"
- Released: June 21, 1980
- Genre: Country
- Length: 3:15
- Label: RCA Victor
- Songwriters: Steve Dorff; Snuff Garrett; Gary Harju; Larry Herbstritt
- Producer: Snuff Garrett

Ronnie Milsap singles chronology
"My Heart" (1980)	"Cowboys and Clowns" (1980)	"Smoky Mountain Rain" (1980)

"Cowboys and Clowns" is a song written by Steve Dorff, Snuff Garrett, Gary Harju and Larry Herbstritt, and recorded by American country music artist Ronnie Milsap. It was released in June 1980 and is featured on the soundtrack for the film Bronco Billy. The song was Milsap's fifteenth number one on the country chart. The single stayed number one for one week and spent a total of twelve weeks on the country chart.

The song was issued as a double A-side with a cover of Porter Wagoner's 1962 hit "Misery Loves Company".

== Charts ==
Chart (1980)	Peak position
US Hot Country Songs (Billboard)	1
US Bubbling Under Hot 100 (Billboard)	3
Canadian RPM Country Tracks	10
