= Just in Case (Ronnie Milsap song) =

Single by Ronnie Milsap

from the album Night Things
- B-side: "Remember to Remind Me (I'm Leaving)"
- Released: October 25, 1975
- Genre: Country
- Length: 2:49
- Label: RCA Victor
- Songwriter: Hugh Moffatt
- Producers: Tom Collins; Jack D. Johnson

Ronnie Milsap singles chronology
"Daydreams About Night Things" (1975)	"Just in Case" (1975)	"What Goes On When the Sun Goes Down" (1976)

"Just in Case" is a song written by Hugh Moffatt, and recorded by American country music artist Ronnie Milsap. It was released on October 25, 1975 as the second single from his album Night Things. The song reached number 4 on the Billboard Hot Country Singles chart. The song was also covered by fellow artist Barbara Mandrell that same year on her album This Is Barbara Mandrell.

== Chart performance ==
Chart (1975–1976)	Peak position
US Hot Country Songs (Billboard)	4
Canadian RPM Country Tracks	5
