= What Goes On When the Sun Goes Down =

Single by Ronnie Milsap

from the album 20/20 Vision
- B-side: "Love Takes a Long Time to Die"
- Released: March 20, 1976
- Recorded: January 1976
- Genre: Country
- Length: 2:51
- Label: RCA Victor
- Songwriter: John Schweers
- Producer: Tom Collins

Ronnie Milsap singles chronology
"Just in Case" (1975)	"What Goes On When the Sun Goes Down" (1976)	"(I'm A) Stand by My Woman Man" (1976)

"What Goes On When the Sun Goes Down" is a song written by John Schweers, and recorded by American country music artist Ronnie Milsap. It was released on March 20, 1976 as the first single from the album 20/20 Vision. The song was Milsap's fifth number one on the country chart. The single stayed at number one for one week and spent a total of eleven weeks on the country chart.

== Charts ==
=== Weekly charts ===
Chart (1976)	Peak position
US Hot Country Songs (Billboard)	1
Canadian RPM Country Tracks	1

=== Year-end charts ===
Chart (1976)	Position
US Hot Country Songs (Billboard)	26
