= My Heart (Ronnie Milsap song) =

Single by Ronnie Milsap

from the album Milsap Magic
- B-side: "Silent Night (After the Fight)"
- Released: April 12, 1980
- Genre: Country
- Length: 2:42
- Label: RCA Victor
- Songwriters: Don Pfrimmer; Charles Quillen
- Producers: Ronnie Milsap, Rob Galbraith

Ronnie Milsap singles chronology
"Why Don't You Spend the Night" (1980)	"My Heart" (1980)	"Cowboys and Clowns" (1980)

"My Heart' is a song written by Don Pfrimmer and Charles Quillen, and recorded by American country music artist Ronnie Milsap. It was released on April 12, 1980 as the second single from the album Milsap Magic. Released as a double A-side with "Silent Night (After the Fight)", the song became Milsap's fourteenth number one country hit. The single stayed at number one for three weeks and spent a total of thirteen weeks on the country chart.

== Chart performance ==
Chart (1980)	Peak position
US Hot Country Songs (Billboard)	1
Canadian RPM Country Tracks	13

=== Year-end charts ===
Chart (1980)	Position
US Country Songs (Billboard)	1
