= Why Don't You Spend the Night =

Single by Ronnie Milsap

from the album Milsap Magic
- B-side: "Heads I Go Hearts I Say"
- Released: January 12, 1980
- Genre: Country
- Length: 4:12
- Label: RCA Victor
- Songwriter: Bob McDill
- Producers: Ronnie Milsap, Rob Galbraith

Ronnie Milsap singles chronology
"In No Time at All" (1979)	"Why Don't You Spend the Night" (1980)	"My Heart" (1980)

"Why Don't You Spend the Night" is a song written by Bob McDill, and recorded by American country music artist Ronnie Milsap. It was released in January 1980 as the first single from the album Milsap Magic. The song was Milsap's thirteenth number one on the country chart. The single spent a week at number one and a total of eleven weeks on the chart. A version by the Canadian duo Jameson Booker reached number 17 in the Canadian AC charts, August 1980.

== Chart performance ==
Chart (1980)	Peak position
US Hot Country Songs (Billboard)	1
Canadian RPM Country Tracks	2

=== Year-end charts ===
Chart (1980)	Position
US Hot Country Songs (Billboard)	15
