= Only One Love in My Life =

Studio album by Ronnie Milsap
- Released: June 17, 1978
- Genre: Country
- Length: 35:03
- Label: RCA Victor
- Producers: Tom Collins, Ronnie Milsap

Ronnie Milsap chronology
It Was Almost Like a Song (1977)	Only One Love in My Life (1978)	Images (1979)

Singles from Only One Love in My Life
- 1. "Only One Love in My Life" Released: June 3, 1978; 2. "Let's Take the Long Way Around the World" Released: September 2, 1978; 3. "Back on My Mind Again" Released: December 16, 1978

Professional ratings
Review scores
Source	Rating
AllMusic	2/5 stars

Only One Love in My Life is the ninth studio album by American country music artist Ronnie Milsap. The album produced two #1 hits for Milsap in the US, including the title track, which also peaked at #63 on the Billboard Hot 100. "Let's Take the Long Way Around the World," was the other #1 single. "Back on My Mind Again" also was released as a single, reaching #2 on country charts.

Only One Love in My Life reached #3 on Country album charts and reached the Billboard 200, peaking at #109. It was ultimately certified as Gold.

== Track listing ==
No.	Title	Writer(s)	Length
1.	"Let's Take the Long Way Around the World"	Archie Jordan, Naomi Martin	3:29
2.	"Back on My Mind Again"	Conrad Pierce, Charles Quillen	3:20
3.	"Only One Love in My Life"	R. C. Bannon, John Bettis	3:33
4.	"I'm Not Trying to Forget"	Kent Robbins	3:06
5.	"No Relief in Sight"	Rory Bourke, Gene Dobbins, Johnny Wilson	3:01
6.	"Once I Get Over You"	John Bettis, Archie Jordan	3:42
7.	"Santa Barbara"	Hal David, Jordan	4:20
8.	"Too Soon to Know"	Don Gibson	3:26
9.	"Yesterday's Lovers"	Ken Jones, John Schweers	3:34
10.	"I've Got the Music in Me"	Tobias Boshell	3:32

== Chart ==
=== Weekly charts ===
Chart (1978)	Peak position
US Billboard 200	109
US Top Country Albums (Billboard)	3

=== Year-end charts ===
Chart (1978)	Position
US Top Country Albums (Billboard)	27
Chart (1979)	Position
US Top Country Albums (Billboard)	21

=== Singles ===
Year	Song	US Country	US	US AC
1978	"Only One Love in My Life"	1	63	-
1978	"Let's Take the Long Way Around the World"	1	-	-
1979	"Back on My Mind Again"	2	-	-

== Certifications ==
Region	Certification	Certified units/sales
United States (RIAA)	Gold	500,000^{^}
^{^} Shipments figures based on certification alone.
