= Still Losing You =

Single by Ronnie Milsap

from the album One More Try for Love
- B-side: "I'll Take Care of You"
- Released: May 19, 1984
- Genre: Country
- Length: 4:31 (single/radio edit); 5:18 (album)
- Label: RCA Victor
- Songwriter: Mike Reid
- Producers: Ronnie Milsap, Rob Galbraith

Ronnie Milsap singles chronology
"Show Her" (1983)	"Still Losing You" (1984)	"Prisoner of the Highway" (1984)

"Still Losing You" is a song written by Mike Reid, and recorded by American country music singer Ronnie Milsap. It was released in May 1984 as the first single from the album One More Try for Love.

== Success and reception ==
"Still Losing You" was Ronnie Milsap's 38th single to be released and his 25th No. 1 hit on the Billboard country charts, and became one of his biggest hits. "Still Losing You" was also a minor hit on the Adult Contemporary charts where it peaked at No. 29. It was originally made exclusive to the album titled One More Try For Love, but is now featured on many of Milsap's compilation albums; these include The Essential Ronnie Milsap, 40 #1 Hits, and Ultimate Ronnie Milsap.

=== Single edit ===
The single version, which also served as the radio edit, omits a 32-second instrumental prologue at the beginning of the song, plus has a slightly earlier fade.

== Charts ==
=== Weekly charts ===
Chart (1984)	Peak position
US Adult Contemporary (Billboard)	29
US Hot Country Songs (Billboard)	1
Canadian RPM Country Tracks	1

=== Year-end charts ===
Chart (1984)	Position
US Hot Country Songs (Billboard)	16
