= Out Where the Bright Lights Are Glowing =

Studio album by Ronnie Milsap
- Released: March 30, 1981
- Studios: Woodland Sound Studios (Nashville, Tennessee)
- Genre: Country
- Length: 40:30
- Label: RCA Victor
- Producers: Ronnie Milsap; Tom Collins

Ronnie Milsap chronology
Greatest Hits (1980)	Out Where the Bright Lights Are Glowing (1981)	There's No Gettin' Over Me (1981)

Singles from Milsap Magic
- 1. "Am I Losing You" Released: February 1981

Out Where the Bright Lights Are Glowing is a studio album by American country music artist Ronnie Milsap, released on March 30, 1981 through RCA Records. The album produced one single, "Am I Losing You", which was a #1 hit for Milsap. The album is a tribute to the late Jim Reeves, and all songs are covers of Reeves songs, except for two new tunes, which were written about Reeves specifically for this project. The two new songs are "Out Where the Bright Lights are Glowing" and "Dear Friend".

The album reached number six on Billboard's country album chart and number 89 on the Billboard 200.

== Critical reception ==
Professional ratings
Review scores
Source	Rating
AllMusic	2/5 stars
The Rolling Stone Album Guide	3/5 stars

The Rolling Stone Album Guide wrote that "Milsap has a stronger voice than did Reeves, and is able to summon forth emotions that Reeves smoothed over."

== Track listing ==
From the original album sleeve notes.

1. "Out Where the Bright Lights are Glowing" (Gary Harrison, Kent Robbins) – 3:22 + "String Interlude" – 0.31
2. "Four Walls" (Marvin Moore, George Campbell) – 3:15
3. "Pride Goes Before a Fall" (Leon Payne) – 3:03 + "Guitar Interlude" – 0.28
4. "I'm Beginning to Forget You" (Willie Phelps) – 3:02 + "String Interlude" – 0.23
5. "He'll Have to Go" (Joe Allison, Audrey Allison) – 2:33
6. "I'm Gettin' Better" (Jim Reeves) – 4:08
7. "Am I Losing You" (Reeves) – 3:35 + "String Interlude" – 0.27
8. "I Won't Forget You" (Harlan Howard) – 2:10 + "Dobro Interlude" – 0:31
9. "I Guess I'm Crazy (For Loving You)" (Werly Fairburn) – 2:54
10. "When Two Worlds Collide" (Roger Miller, Bill Anderson) – 2:29 + "String Interlude" – 0:19
11. "Missing You" (Red Sovine, Dale Noe) – 2:55
12. "Dear Friend" + Instrumental finale (Dennis Morgan, Kye Fleming) – 3:08

== Personnel ==
From the original album sleeve notes.

- Ronnie Milsap – lead vocals, acoustic piano, synthesizers
- Hargus "Pig" Robbins – acoustic piano
- Bobby Emmons – Rhodes electric piano
- Bobby Ogdin – Rhodes electric piano
- Richard Ripani – synthesizers
- Jimmy Capps – electric guitar, rhythm guitar
- Billy Sanford – electric guitar
- Jack Watkins – rhythm guitar
- Hal Rugg – dobro, steel guitar
- John Hughey – steel guitar
- Warren Gowers – bass guitar
- Kenny Malone – drums
- Charlie McCoy – vibraphone, harmonica
- Farrell Morris – vibraphone
- The Sheldon Kurland Strings – strings (2, 3, 5–8, 11, 12)
- Bergen White – string arrangements (2, 3, 5–8, 11, 12)
- Les Jane Berinati – backing vocals
- Jackie Cusic – backing vocals
- Bruce Dees – backing vocals
- Dolores Edgin – backing vocals
- Sheri Kramer – backing vocals
- Donna Levine – backing vocals
- Donna McElroy – backing vocals
- Ray Walker – backing vocals
- Duane West – backing vocals
- Hurshel Wiginton – backing vocals

== Production ==
From the original album sleeve notes.

- Tom Collins – producer
- Ronnie Milsap – producer
- Les Ladd – recording
- Steve Ham – assistant engineer
- Russ Martin – assistant engineer
- Denny Purcell – mastering
- Jim McGuire – photography
- David Hogan Design – art direction
- Chet Atkins – liner notes

== Chart performance ==
=== Album ===
Chart (1981)	Peak position
U.S. Billboard Top Country Albums	6
U.S. Billboard 200	89

=== Singles ===
Year	Single	Peak positions	
Year	Single	US Country	CAN Country
1981	"Am I Losing You"	1	1
