= Let's Take the Long Way Around the World =

Single by Ronnie Milsap

from the album Only One Love in My Life
- B-side: "I'm Not Trying to Forget"
- Released: September 2, 1978
- Genre: Country
- Length: 3:27
- Label: RCA Victor
- Songwriters: Archie Jordan, Naomi Martin
- Producers: Tom Collins, Ronnie Milsap

Ronnie Milsap singles chronology
"Only One Love in My Life" (1978)	"Let's Take the Long Way Around the World" (1978)	"Back on My Mind Again" (1979)

"Let's Take the Long Way Around the World" is a song written by Archie Jordan and Naomi Martin, and recorded by American country music artist Ronnie Milsap. It was released in September 1978 as the second single from the album Only One Love in My Life. The song was Milsap's eleventh number one on the country charts. The single stayed at number one for a single week and spent ten weeks on the chart.

== Cover versions ==
In 1979, Kenny Rogers and Dottie West recorded the song on their duet album Classics, but didn't release it as a single.

Also in 1978, Jim Ed Brown and Helen Cornelius recorded the song on their duet album You Don't Bring Me Flowers, but didn't release it as a single. It was released as the B-side to their single "Lying In Love with You."

== Chart performance ==
Chart (1978)	Peak position
US Hot Country Songs (Billboard)	1
Canadian RPM Country Tracks	1
