= Show Her =

Single by Ronnie Milsap

from the album Keyed Up
- B-side: "Watch Out for the Other Guy"
- Released: October 1983
- Genre: Country
- Length: 3:58
- Label: RCA Victor
- Songwriter: Mike Reid
- Producers: Tom Collins; Ronnie Milsap

Ronnie Milsap singles chronology
"Don't You Know How Much I Love You" (1983)	"Show Her" (1983)	"Still Losing You" (1984)

"Show Her" is a song written by Mike Reid, and recorded by American country music artist Ronnie Milsap. It was released in October 1983 as the third single from the album Keyed Up. The song was Milsap's twenty-fifth number one country hit. The single went to number one for one week and spent a total of fourteen weeks on the country chart.

== Charts ==
=== Weekly charts ===
Chart (1983–1984)	Peak position
US Hot Country Songs (Billboard)	1
US Bubbling Under Hot 100 (Billboard)	3
US Adult Contemporary (Billboard)	17
Canadian RPM Country Tracks	1
Canadian RPM Adult Contemporary Tracks	4

=== Year-end charts ===
Chart (1984)	Position
US Hot Country Songs (Billboard)	41
