= I Wouldn't Have Missed It for the World =

Single by Ronnie Milsap

from the album There's No Gettin' Over Me
- B-side: "It Happens Every Time (I Think of You)"
- Released: October 1981 (U.S.)
- Recorded: 1981
- Genre: Country, pop
- Length: 3:35
- Label: RCA Victor
- Songwriters: Kye Fleming, Dennis Morgan, Charles Quillen
- Producers: Ronnie Milsap, Tom Collins

Ronnie Milsap singles chronology
"(There's) No Gettin' Over Me" (1981)	"I Wouldn't Have Missed It for the World" (1981)	"Any Day Now" (1982)

"I Wouldn't Have Missed It for the World" is a song written by Charles Quillen, Kye Fleming and Dennis Morgan, and recorded by American country music singer Ronnie Milsap. It was released in October 1981 as the second single from the album There's No Gettin' Over Me. The song became one of his biggest hits in his recording career and came during the peak of his crossover success.

== Critical reception ==
Tom Jurek, a music reviewer and writer for AllMusic, cited "I Wouldn't Have Missed It ..." as "urban cowboy country music in its purest essence," referring to the pop crossover-style of country music that was in vogue during the early 1980s. The song — which prominently featured backing vocals, a harp and acoustic guitar — had a chorus that, wrote Jurek, "is so infectious it could be heard being hummed and whistled on street corners and its words being sung in barrooms and dancehalls throughout the rest of 1981."

== Charts ==
His 19th No. 1 hit on the Billboard Hot Country Singles chart in January 1982, "I Wouldn't Have Missed It For the World" reached No. 20 on the Billboard Hot 100 chart. The song also reached No. 3 on Billboard's Hot Adult Contemporary Singles chart.

A video was also produced of the song, and it has aired on The Nashville Network, CMT and GAC.

Chart (1981–1982)	Peak position
Australia (Kent Music Report)	57
US Hot Country Songs (Billboard)	1
US Billboard Hot 100	20
US Adult Contemporary (Billboard)	3
Canadian RPM Country Tracks	1
Canada RPM Adult Contemporary	1
