= Don't You Know How Much I Love You =

Single by Ronnie Milsap

from the album Keyed Up
- B-side: "Feelings of Change"
- Released: July 1983
- Genre: Country
- Length: 3:26
- Label: RCA Victor
- Songwriters: Michael Stewart; Dan Williams
- Producers: Tom Collins; Ronnie Milsap

Ronnie Milsap singles chronology
"Is It Over" (1983)	"Don't You Know How Much I Love You" (1983)	"Show Her" (1983)

"Don't You Know How Much I Love You" is a song written by Michael Stewart and Dan Williams, and recorded by American country music artist Ronnie Milsap. It was released in July 1983 as the second single from the album Keyed Up. The song was Milsap's twenty-third number one country hit. The single went to number one for one week and spent a total of twelve weeks on the country chart.

== Charts ==
=== Weekly charts ===
Chart (1983)	Peak position
US Hot Country Songs (Billboard)	1
US Billboard Hot 100	58
US Adult Contemporary (Billboard)	12
Canadian RPM Country Tracks	1
Canadian RPM Adult Contemporary Tracks	8

=== Year-end charts ===
Chart (1983)	Position
US Hot Country Songs (Billboard)	43
