= It Was Almost Like a Song (album) =

Studio album by Ronnie Milsap
- Released: 1977
- Genre: Country
- Length: 35:04
- Label: RCA Victor
- Producers: Ronnie Milsap, Tom Collins

Ronnie Milsap chronology
Ronnie Milsap Live (1976)	It Was Almost Like a Song (1977)	Only One Love in My Life (1978)

Singles from It Was Almost Like a Long
- 1. "It Was Almost Like a Song" Released: May 28, 1977; 2. "What a Difference You've Made in My Life" Released: November 19, 1977

Professional ratings
Review scores
Source	Rating
AllMusic	3/5 stars

It Was Almost Like a Song is the eighth studio album by American country music artist Ronnie Milsap. It was released in 1977 by RCA Records. The album produced two No. 1 hits for Milsap, including the title track, which marked his debut on the Adult Contemporary chart, peaking at No. 7 and reaching No. 16 on the Billboard 100. "What a Difference You've Made in My Life," was the other No. 1 single, it was re-recorded for his 2009 album Then Sings My Soul.

It Was Almost Like a Song reached No. 3 on Country album charts and broke the Top 100 of the Billboard 200, peaking at No. 97. It was ultimately certified as Gold. The album won "Album of the Year" at the 1978 Country Music Association Awards.

AllMusic described the album as Milsap's "breakthrough pop album", commenting that "the music here changed what radio programmers would accept", enabling the "chance" to "crossover."

== Track listing ==
No.	Title	Writer(s)	Length
1.	"What a Difference You've Made in My Life"	Archie Jordan	3:59
2.	"No One Will Ever Know"	Mel Foree, Fred Rose	3:22
3.	"It Was Almost Like a Song"	Hal David, Jordan	3:35
4.	"Selfish"	Dennis Morgan	3:18
5.	"Long Distance Memory"	John Schweers	2:59
6.	"Here in Love"	Kent Robbins	3:10
7.	"Future's Not What It Used to Be"	Mickey Newbury	4:14
8.	"It Don't Hurt to Dream"	Dan Pate, Charles Quillen	2:44
9.	"Crystal Fallin' Rain"	Schweers	3:49
10.	"The Lovin' Kind"	Roger Bowling, Larry Butler	3:54

== Production ==
- Produced By Ronnie Milsap & Tom Collins
- Engineers: Bill Harris Quintet, Les Ladd, David McKinley, Al Pachucki, Chuck Seitz

== Personnel ==
- Drums: Hayward Bishop, Kenny Malone
- Vibraphone: Farrell Morris
- Harmonica: Charlie McCoy
- Bass guitar: Johnny Cobb, Mike Leech, Jack Williams
- Piano: Shane Keister, Ronnie Milsap, Hargus "Pig" Robbins
- Acoustic Guitar: Jimmy Capps, Ray Edenton, Chip Young
- Electric guitar: Peter Bordonali, Glenn Keener, Jack Watkins, Reggie Young
- Steel Guitar: Dick Overbey, Hal Rugg
- Fiddle: Tommy Williams
- Lead Vocals: Ronnie Milsap
- Background Vocals: The Lea Jane Singers
- Strings Arrangements: Cam Mullins (tracks 3,4,5,10), D. Bergen White (tracks 1,7,9)

== Chart ==
Chart (1977)	Peak position
U.S. Top Country Albums	3
U.S. Billboard 200	97

=== Singles ===
Year	Song	US Country	US	US AC
1977	"It Was Almost Like a Song"	1	16	7
1977	"What a Difference You've Made in My Life"	1	80	-

== Certifications ==
Region	Certification	Certified units/sales
United States (RIAA)	Gold	500,000^{^}
^{^} Shipments figures based on certification alone.
