= Button Off My Shirt =

1988 single by Ronnie Milsap

Single by Ronnie Milsap

from the album Heart and Soul
- B-side: "One Night"
- Released: July 23, 1988
- Genre: Country, pop
- Length: 3:54
- Label: RCA Records
- Songwriters: Billy Livsey, Graham Lyle
- Producer: Rob Galbraith

Ronnie Milsap singles chronology
| "Old Folks" (1988) | "Button Off My Shirt" (1988) | "Don't You Ever Get Tired (Of Hurting Me)" (1989) |

"Button Off My Shirt" is a song written by Billy Livsey and Graham Lyle, and recorded by American country music singer Ronnie Milsap. It released in July 1988 as the fifth single from the album Heart and Soul. It peaked at number four on the Hot Country Songs charts.

== Content ==
The song talks of an ended relationship, where the narrator compares his former lover to a missing button from his shirt – "just an everyday distraction" which "some day he will replace".

== Cover versions ==
Another version was released in 1988 by British singer Paul Carrack, from the album One Good Reason. This version peaked at number 91 on the Billboard Hot 100.

== Charts ==
=== Ronnie Milsap ===
==== Weekly charts ====
| Chart (1988) | Peak position |
|---|---|
| Canada Country Tracks (RPM) | 4 |
| US Hot Country Songs (Billboard) | 4 |

==== Year-end charts ====
| Chart (1988) | Position |
|---|---|
| US Hot Country Songs (Billboard) | 56 |

=== Paul Carrack ===
| Chart (1988) | Peak position |
|---|---|
| US Billboard Hot 100 | 91 |
