= (There's) No Gettin' Over Me =

Single by Ronnie Milsap

from the album There's No Gettin' Over Me
- B-side: "I Live My Whole Life at Night"
- Released: June 12, 1981
- Recorded: 1981
- Genre: Country pop; yacht rock
- Length: 3:15
- Label: RCA Victor
- Songwriters: Walt Aldridge; Tom Brasfield
- Producers: Ronnie Milsap; Tom Collins

Ronnie Milsap singles chronology
"Am I Losing You" (1981)	"(There's) No Gettin' Over Me" (1981)	"I Wouldn't Have Missed It for the World" (1981)

"(There's) No Gettin' Over Me" is a song written by Walt Aldridge and Tom Brasfield, and recorded by American country music singer Ronnie Milsap. It was released in June 1981 as the first single from the album There's No Gettin' Over Me. Known by many fans by its less grammatically correct title "There Ain't No Gettin' Over Me" — the song's official title appears nowhere in the lyrics — the song became one of Milsap's biggest country hits and his only top 10 pop hit during his recording career.

== Critical reception ==
Thom Jurek of Allmusic wrote that "(There's) No Gettin' Over Me" — and the album from which it came — was "indicative of the times and the artists making hit records at the same time." Milsap's "urban country" style, as Jurek put it, was evident in the song, given its "sweet alto saxophone solo" and "chorus that reflects James Taylor's late-'70s attempts at crooning early rock."

== Cover versions ==
A cover version was recorded by Heartland on their 2006 album I Loved Her First.

In 2018, Milsap rerecorded the song with Kacey Musgraves, which appeared on his 2019 album Ronnie Milsap: The Duets.

== Commercial performance ==
His 18th No. 1 hit on the Billboard Hot Country Singles chart in August 1981, "(There's) No Gettin' Over Me" marked the apex of Milsap's popularity as a crossover artist, reaching No. 5 for 5 weeks on the Billboard Hot 100 chart and number two Hot Adult Contemporary Singles.

A video was also produced of the song, and it has aired on The Nashville Network, CMT and GAC.

== Chart history ==
=== Weekly charts ===
Chart (1981)	Peak position
Australia (Kent Music Report)	98
US Hot Country Songs (Billboard)	1
US Billboard Hot 100	5
US Adult Contemporary (Billboard)	2
Canadian RPM Country Tracks	1
Canadian RPM Top 100	21
Canadian RPM Adult Contemporary Tracks	1

=== Year-end charts ===
Chart (1981)	Rank
U.S. Billboard Hot Country Singles	2
U.S. Billboard Hot Adult Contemporary Tracks	14
U.S. Billboard Hot 100	33
U.S. Cashbox Top 100	57
