= Where Do the Nights Go =

Single by Ronnie Milsap

from the album Heart and Soul
- B-side: "If You Don't Want Me To"
- Released: September 1987
- Genre: Country
- Length: 4:32
- Label: RCA Victor
- Songwriters: Rory Bourke; Mike Reid
- Producer: Rob Galbraith

Ronnie Milsap singles chronology
| "Make No Mistake, She's Mine" (1987) | "Where Do the Nights Go" (1987) | "Old Folks" (1988) |

"Where Do the Nights Go" is a song written by Mike Reid and Rory Bourke, and recorded by American country music artist Ronnie Milsap. It was released in September 1987 as the third single from the album Heart and Soul. The song was Milsap's thirty-third number one on the country chart. The single went to number one for one week and spent thirteen weeks on the country chart.

== Charts ==
| Chart (1987–1988) | Peak position |
|---|---|
| US Hot Country Songs (Billboard) | 1 |
| Canadian RPM Country Tracks | 1 |
