= Smoky Mountain Rain =

1980 single by Ronnie Milsap

Single by Ronnie Milsap

from the album Greatest Hits
- B-side: "Crystal Fallin' Rain"
- Released: October 11, 1980
- Recorded: 1980
- Genre: Country
- Length: 3:43
- Label: RCA Victor
- Songwriters: Kye Fleming, Dennis Morgan
- Producers: Tom Collins, Ronnie Milsap

Ronnie Milsap singles chronology
"Cowboys and Clowns" / "Misery Loves Company" (1980)	"Smoky Mountain Rain" (1980)	"Am I Losing You" (1981)

"Smoky Mountain Rain" is a song written by Kye Fleming and Dennis Morgan and recorded by American country music singer Ronnie Milsap. It was released in September 1980 as the only single from his Greatest Hits compilation album. The single became one of his best-known songs.

In 2010, "Smoky Mountain Rain" became Tennessee's eighth state song as a result of action by the Tennessee General Assembly on June 3, 2010. In 2014, Rolling Stone ranked "Smoky Mountain Rain" number 96 in their list of the 100 greatest country songs.

== Content ==
The song is a first-person narrative of a man who has left Los Angeles and returned to Knoxville, Tennessee, due to "a change of dreams." He attempts to call a woman from a phone booth, but learns that she is gone. Attempting to find her, he then gets a ride from a truck driver who is going to Gatlinburg, Tennessee. Although he "can't blame her for letting go," he vows to find her "no matter what it takes." Rain is mentioned in the opening verse, in the bridge, and three times in the chorus. Milsap liked the lyrics of Elvis Presley's "Kentucky Rain" so much that "Smoky Mountain Rain" was written for him similarly, albeit with a slightly different flavor: Milsap had played piano on the recording of Presley's "Kentucky Rain" in 1969.

== Critical reception ==
In 2024, Rolling Stone ranked the song at number 115 on its 200 Greatest Country Songs of All Time.

== Charts ==
The song was Milsap's 16th number-one hit on Billboard magazine's Hot Country Singles chart, where it stayed at the top for one week in December 1980. "Smoky Mountain Rain" also fared well as a crossover hit and was the first of his two number-one hits on the Billboard Adult Contemporary chart (the other being "Any Day Now"), as well as number 24 on the Billboard Hot 100.

Chart (1980–1981)	Peak position
US Hot Country Songs (Billboard)	1
US Billboard Hot 100	24
US Adult Contemporary (Billboard)	1
Canadian RPM Country Tracks	8

Year-end chart (1981)	Rank
US Top Pop Singles (Billboard)	88

== 2019 version ==
"Smoky Mountain Rain"

Single by Ronnie Milsap featuring Dolly Parton

from the album The Duets
- Released: May 1, 2019
- Recorded: 2018
- Genre: Country
- Length: 3:45
- Label: Riser House; GForce
- Songwriters: Dennis Morgan; Kye Fleming
- Producers: Rob Galbraith; Ronnie Milsap

Dolly Parton singles chronology
"Girl in the Movies" (2018)	"Smoky Mountain Rain" (2019)	"I Will Always Love You" (2019)

Music video
- "Smoky Mountain Rain" on YouTube

In 2019, Milsap released a new version of the song featuring American singer-songwriter Dolly Parton (with additional lyrics written by Parton). It was produced by Milsap and Rob Galbraith and released on Milsap's 2019 album, The Duets. It was sent to country radio as the first single from the album on May 1, 2019, and adult contemporary radio on June 19.

=== Music video ===
An animated music video for the song was released on May 16, 2019. The video tells the story of a man who has come back to a woman whom he has left, only to find that she has moved on.

=== Charts ===
Chart (2019)	Peak position
US Adult Contemporary (Billboard)	27
