= What a Difference You've Made in My Life =

Single by Ronnie Milsap

from the album It Was Almost Like a Song
- B-side: "Selfish"
- Released: November 1977
- Recorded: April 1977
- Genre: Country, inspirational
- Length: 3:59
- Label: RCA
- Songwriter(s): Archie Jordan
- Producer(s): Ronnie Milsap, Tom Collins

Ronnie Milsap singles chronology
"It Was Almost Like a Song" (1977)	"What a Difference You've Made in My Life" (1977)	"Only One Love in My Life" (1978)

"What a Difference You've Made in My Life" is an inspirational song written by Archie Jordan and first made famous by two artists during 1977: then-teenage Christian music singer Amy Grant and country music singer Ronnie Milsap.

== Song history ==
Amy Grant's version was included on her self-titled debut album, which was sold largely in Christian bookstores and outlets. The song was released as a single to Christian-oriented radio stations, charted at No. 5 on the US Christian charts, and helped Grant become well known in what was then a small sub-genre of religious-themed music.

However, Milsap's version became better-known. It was released in November 1977 as the second single from the album It Was Almost Like a Song. The song soon scored the Billboard Hot Country Songs chart and was his ninth No. 1 song on that chart. Milsap re-recorded the song for his 2009 country gospel album, Then Sings My Soul.

In 1978, B. J. Thomas covered the song on his Happy Man album, which became a Top 10 Christian hit.

== Chart history ==
Chart (1977–1978)	Peak position
U.S. Billboard Hot Country Singles	1
US Billboard Hot 100	80
Canadian RPM Country Tracks	1
Canadian RPM Top Singles	96
Canadian RPM Adult Contemporary Tracks	43
