= Back on My Mind Again =

Single by Ronnie Milsap

from the album Only One Love in My Life
- B-side: "Santa Barbara"
- Released: December 16, 1978
- Genre: Country
- Length: 3:17
- Label: RCA Victor
- Songwriters: Conrad Pierce; Charles Quillen
- Producers: Tom Collins, Ronnie Milsap

Ronnie Milsap singles chronology
| "Let's Take the Long Way Around the World" (1978) | "Back on My Mind Again" (1978) | "Nobody Likes Sad Songs" (1979) |

"Back on My Mind Again" is a song written by Charles Quillen and Conrad Pierce, and recorded by American country music artist Ronnie Milsap. It was released in December 1978 as the third single from his album Only One Love in My Life. The song reached number 2 on the Billboard Hot Country Singles chart.

The B-side "Santa Barbara", written by Hal David and Archie Jordan, also charted.

== Chart performance ==
Back on My Mind Again

| Chart (1978–1979) | Peak position |
|---|---|
| US Hot Country Songs (Billboard) | 2 |
| Canadian RPM Country Tracks | 1 |

Santa Barbara

| Chart (1978–1979) | Peak position |
|---|---|
| U.S. Billboard Hot Country Singles | 2 |

=== Year-end charts ===
| Chart (1979) | Position |
|---|---|
| US Hot Country Songs (Billboard) | 28 |
