= (I'm A) Stand by My Woman Man =

Single by Ronnie Milsap

from the album 20/20 Vision
- B-side: "Lovers, Friends and Strangers"
- Released: July 10, 1976
- Genre: Country
- Length: 2:58
- Label: RCA Victor
- Songwriter: Kent Robbins
- Producers: Tom Collins, Jack D. Johnson

Ronnie Milsap singles chronology
"What Goes On When the Sun Goes Down" (1976)	"(I'm A) Stand by My Woman Man" (1976)	"Let My Love Be Your Pillow" (1977)

"(I'm A) Stand by My Woman Man" is a song written by Kent Robbins, and recorded by American country music artist Ronnie Milsap. It was released in July 1976 as the second single from the album 20/20 Vision. The song was Milsap's sixth number one on the country chart. The single stayed at number one for two weeks and spent a total of eleven weeks within the top 40. It is an answer song to Tammy Wynette's Stand By Your Man. Backing vocals were provided by The Holladay Sisters.

According to Milsap, the song was "almost" a lawsuit because the opening piano melody, played by session musician Hargus "Pig" Robbins, sounded similar to Robbins' intro on "Behind Closed Doors".

== Charts ==
=== Weekly charts ===
Chart (1976)	Peak position
US Hot Country Songs (Billboard)	1
US Adult Contemporary (Billboard)	33
Canadian RPM Country Tracks	1

=== Year-end charts ===
Chart (1976)	Position
US Hot Country Songs (Billboard)	7
