= It Was Almost Like a Song =

Single by Ronnie Milsap

from the album It Was Almost Like a Song
- B-side: "It Don't Hurt to Dream"
- Released: May 28, 1977
- Recorded: April 1977
- Genre: Country
- Length: 3:35
- Label: RCA Victor
- Songwriters: Hal David and Archie Jordan
- Producers: Tom Collins and Ronnie Milsap

Ronnie Milsap singles chronology
| "Let My Love Be Your Pillow" (1976) | "It Was Almost Like a Song" (1977) | "What a Difference You've Made in My Life" (1977) |

"It Was Almost Like a Song" is a song written by Hal David and Archie Jordan, and recorded by American country music singer Ronnie Milsap. It was released on May 28, 1977 as the first single and title track from the album It Was Almost Like a Song. It became one of the greatest hits of his recording career upon its release in 1977.

== Background ==
"It Was Almost Like a Song" provided the basis for the title of Milsap's biography, Almost Like a Song, which he co-wrote with Tom Carter, and was nominated for two Grammy Awards.

== Charts ==
In July 1977, "It Was Almost Like a Song" was Milsap's eighth No. 1 song on the Billboard magazine Hot Country Songs chart. The song also became his first Billboard Hot 100 chart entry, peaking No. 16. and also on Billboard's Hot Adult Contemporary Singles chart, where it peaked at No. 7.

=== Weekly charts ===
| Chart (1977) | Peak position |
|---|---|
| Australia (Kent Music Report) | 81 |
| US Hot Country Songs (Billboard) | 1 |
| US Billboard Hot 100 | 16 |
| US Adult Contemporary (Billboard) | 7 |
| Canadian RPM Country Tracks | 12 |
| Canadian RPM Top Singles | 7 |
| Canadian RPM Adult Contemporary Tracks | 6 |

=== Year-end charts ===
| Chart (1977) | Position |
|---|---|
| US Adult Contemporary (Billboard) | 25 |
| US Hot Country Songs (Billboard) | 5 |
