= Daydreams About Night Things =

1975 single by Ronnie Milsap

Single by Ronnie Milsap

from the album Night Things
- B-side: "(After Sweet Memories) Play Born to Lose Again"
- Released: July 19, 1975
- Genre: Country
- Length: 2:22
- Label: RCA Victor
- Songwriter: John Schweers
- Producers: Tom Collins, Jack D. Johnson

Ronnie Milsap singles chronology
"Too Late to Worry, Too Blue to Cry" (1975)	"Daydreams About Night Things" (1975)	"Just in Case" (1975)

"Daydreams About Night Things" is a song written by John Schweers, and recorded by American country music artist Ronnie Milsap. It was released in July 1975 as the first single from the album Night Things. The song was Milsap's eighth hit on the country chart and his fourth number one on the country chart. The single stayed at number one for two weeks and spent a total of eleven weeks on the country chart.

== Chart performance ==
Chart (1975)	Peak position
US Hot Country Songs (Billboard)	1
Canadian RPM Country Tracks	2
Canadian RPM Adult Contemporary Tracks	35
