= Stranger in My House (Ronnie Milsap song) =

Single by Ronnie Milsap

from the album Keyed Up
- B-side: "Is It Over"
- Released: April 2, 1983
- Genre: Country rock, rock
- Length: 4:11
- Label: RCA Victor
- Songwriter: Mike Reid
- Producers: Tom Collins; Ronnie Milsap

Ronnie Milsap singles chronology
"Inside" (1982)	"Stranger in My House" (1983)	"Is It Over" (1983)

"Stranger in My House" is a song written by Mike Reid and recorded by American country music artist Ronnie Milsap. It was released in April 1983 as the first single from the album Keyed Up.

== Content ==
The song tells of a man who suspects his wife is fantasizing about being with a secret lover. It is mainly in the key of D minor, with some portions of the verses being in D Dorian due to the sixth tone being raised by a half-step. Milsap's vocal ranges exactly two octaves (from D_{3} to D_{5}). The main chord pattern on the verses is Dm-C-G twice, followed by Gm-Dm-Gm-A; the chorus uses Dm-Gm-A twice and ends on a Dm chord.

== Success and reception ==
Milsap's 35th single to be released, the song immediately became a major hit as it peaked at No. 5 on the country chart and No. 8 on the Adult Contemporary chart. The song also went as high as No. 23 on the Billboard Hot 100 pop singles chart.

The song features a rock guitar solo from Bruce Dees. Some country stations edited this solo out of the song, and a station in Denver, Colorado, refused to play the song, because its personnel opined that the song sounded like a Led Zeppelin song. That particular airplay lost from the Denver station likely kept the song from peaking at No 1.

Reid would win the Grammy Award for Best Country Song category for this song in 1984.

== Music video ==
A black-and-white music video for the single, directed by David Hogan, was also released. During the beginning of the video, a man is shown trespassing in the narrator's house as the blind singer plays his piano. During the climax, it shows his wife's imaginary lover playing an electric guitar as she performs an erotic dance to the solo. In the end, it shows detectives investigating the tape outline of an electric guitar.

== Chart performance ==
Chart (1983)	Peak position
Australia (Kent Music Report)	55
Canadian RPM Country Tracks	1
Canadian RPM Top Singles	42
US Hot Country Songs (Billboard)	5
US Billboard Hot 100	23
US Adult Contemporary (Billboard)	8
