= Ronnie Milsap =

American country singer (born 1943)

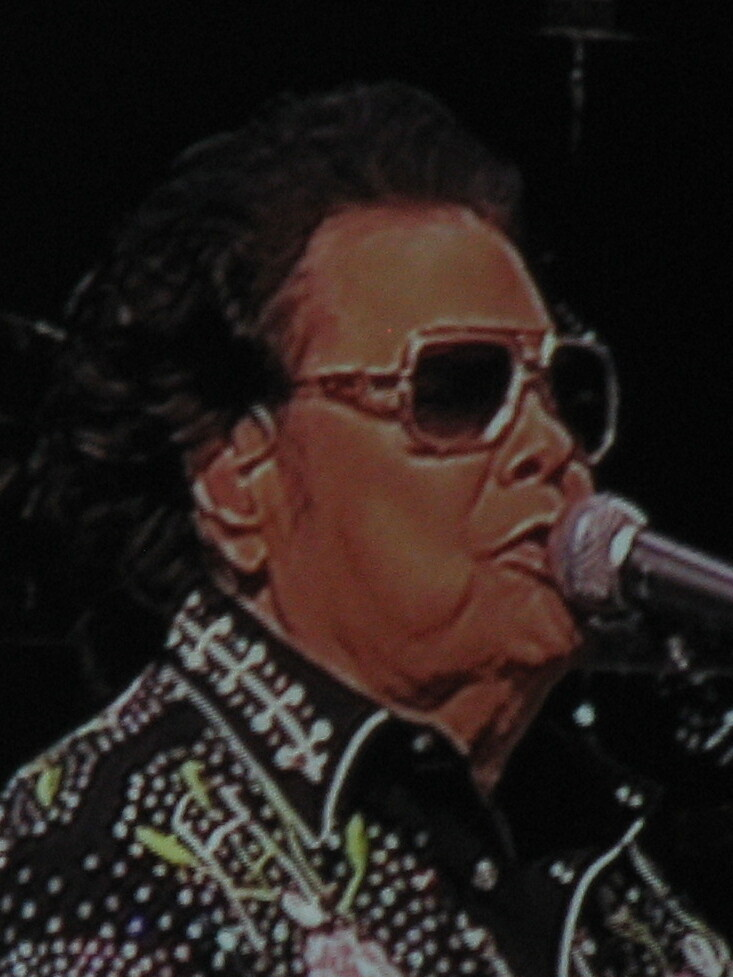
- Milsap in 2019

Background information
- Born: Ronald Lee Millsaps; January 16, 1943 (age 83); Robbinsville, North Carolina, U.S.
- Genres: Country, blue-eyed soul
- Occupations: Singer, musician
- Instruments: Vocals, piano
- Years active: 1963–present
- Labels: Liberty; Pacemaker; Princess (Crazy Cajun); Pye International; RCA; Scepter; Wand; Craft Recordings
- Spouse: Joyce Reeves (m. 1965; died 2021)
- Website: ronniemilsap.com

Ronnie Lee Milsap (born Ronald Lee Millsaps, January 16, 1943) is an American country music singer and pianist. He was one of country music's most popular and influential performers of the 1970s and 1980s. Nearly completely blind from birth, he became one of the most successful and versatile country "crossover" singers of his time, appealing to both country and pop music markets with hit songs that incorporated pop, R&B, and rock and roll elements. His biggest crossover hits include "It Was Almost Like a Song", "Smoky Mountain Rain", "(There's) No Gettin' Over Me", "I Wouldn't Have Missed It for the World", "Any Day Now", "Is It Over" and "Stranger in My House". He is credited with six Grammy Awards and 35 number-one country hits, fourth to George Strait, Conway Twitty, and Merle Haggard. He was selected for induction into the Country Music Hall of Fame in 2014.

== Career ==
=== Early life (1943–1971) ===
Milsap was born January 16, 1943, in Robbinsville, North Carolina. A congenital disorder left him almost completely blind from birth. Abandoned by his mother as an infant, he was raised in poverty by his grandparents in the Smoky Mountains until he was sent to the North Carolina State School for the Blind and Deaf in Raleigh, North Carolina, at age five.

During his childhood, Milsap developed a passion for music, particularly the late-night radio broadcasts of country music, gospel music, and rhythm and blues. When he was 7, his instructors noticed his musical talents. Soon afterward he began formal study of classical music at Governor Morehead School and learned several instruments, eventually mastering the piano.

When he was 14, a slap from one of the school's houseparents caused him to lose what very limited vision he had in his left eye.

With the national breakthrough of Elvis Presley in 1956, Milsap became interested in rock and roll music and formed a rock band called the Apparitions with fellow high-school students. In concert, Milsap has often paid tribute to the musicians of the 1950s who inspired him including Ray Charles, Little Richard, Jerry Lee Lewis, and Presley.

Milsap was awarded a full college scholarship and briefly attended Young Harris College in Young Harris, Georgia, with plans to become a lawyer. During this time, Milsap joined a popular local R&B band called the Dimensions that played gigs in the Atlanta area, and became a regular attraction at the rough and rowdy Royal Peacock Club. In the fall of 1964, Milsap declined a scholarship to law school and left college to pursue a full-time career in music. He met Joyce Reeves one night at a dinner party during this period, after which the two were married in 1965.

In 1963, Milsap met Atlanta disc jockey Pat Hughes, who became an early supporter of his music career. Milsap recorded his first single, "Total Disaster/It Went to Your Head", which enjoyed some local success in the Atlanta area. The single sold 15,000 copies with the help of Hughes, who played the record on his radio show. Around this same time, Milsap auditioned for a job as a keyboardist for musician J. J. Cale. In 1965, Milsap signed with New York–based Scepter Records, recording several obscure singles for the label over the next few years, and working briefly with other soul musicians like Ray Charles and Stevie Wonder.

Also in 1965, Milsap scored his first hit with the Ashford & Simpson–penned single, "Never Had It So Good", which peaked at No. 19 on the R&B chart in November of that year. It would be his only successful single during his time with Scepter. Milsap cut another Ashford & Simpson tune, "Let's Go Get Stoned", that was relegated to a B-side.

In the late 1960s, after moving to Memphis, Tennessee, Milsap worked for producer Chips Moman and became a popular weekly attraction at the Memphis nightclub T.J.'s. During this time, Moman helped Milsap land work as a session musician on numerous projects including several recordings with Elvis Presley such as "Don't Cry Daddy" in 1969 and "Kentucky Rain" in 1970. That same year, Milsap made the lower reaches of the pop charts with the single "Loving You Is a Natural Thing". He recorded and released his debut album, Ronnie Milsap, on Warner Brothers in 1971.

=== Breakthrough success (1973–1975) ===
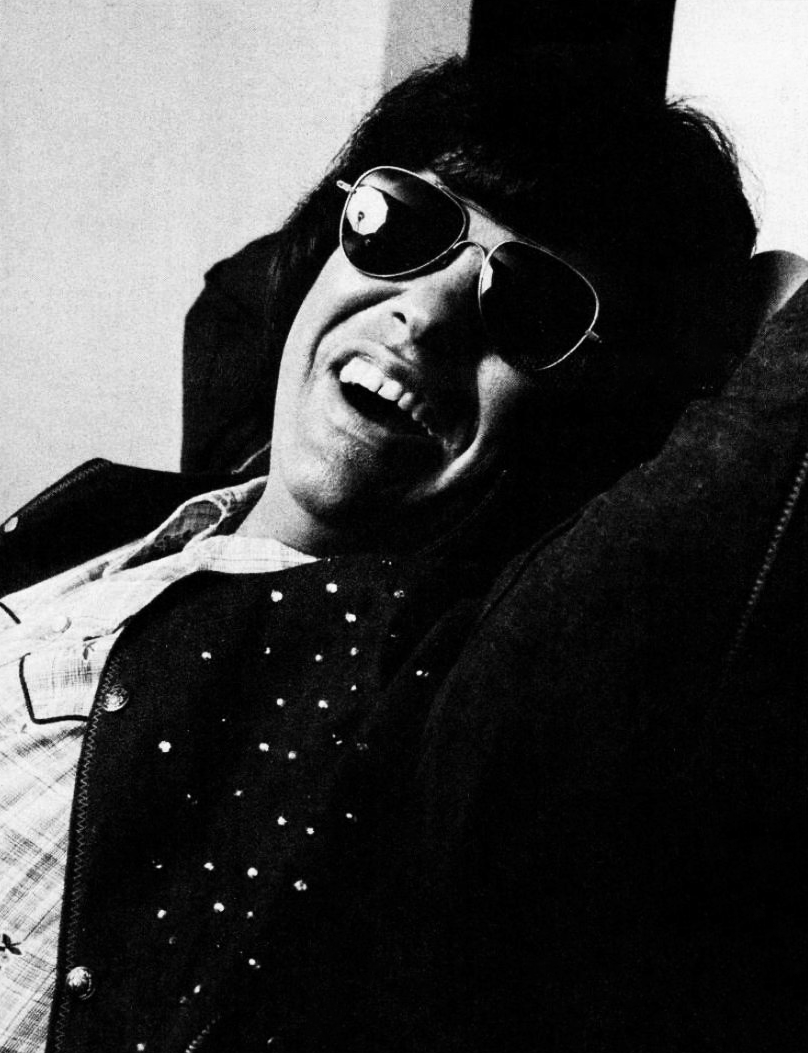
Milsap in 1974

In December 1972, Milsap relocated to Nashville after a chance meeting with country music star Charley Pride who was in the audience for a Milsap gig at the nightclub Whiskey A-Go-Go on Sunset Blvd. in Los Angeles. Pride was impressed with Milsap's singing and encouraged him to change course and focus on country music. Milsap began working with Pride's manager, Jack D. Johnson, and was signed to RCA Records in 1973. He released his first single for RCA that year, "I Hate You", which became his first country music success, peaking at No. 10 on the country chart. In 1974, Milsap toured with Pride as an opening act and had two No. 1 singles: "Pure Love" (written by Eddie Rabbitt) and the Kris Kristofferson composition "Please Don't Tell Me How the Story Ends" which won Milsap his first Grammy. In 1975, he revived the Don Gibson song "(I'd Be) A Legend in My Time" and scored another No. 1 hit with "Daydreams About Night Things".

=== "It Was Almost Like a Song" (1976–1978) ===
From 1976 to 1978, Milsap became one of country music's biggest stars. He scored seven No. 1 singles in a row, including the Grammy-winning "(I'm a) Stand by My Woman Man" and "What a Difference You've Made in My Life". The most significant of this series was "It Was Almost Like a Song" in 1977, a piano-based ballad, which became his most successful single of the 1970s. In addition to topping the Billboard Hot Country Songs chart, the song was his first entry on the Billboard Hot 100 pop music chart since "Please Don't Tell Me How the Story Ends" reached No. 95; "It Was Almost Like a Song," reached No. 16. It was also his first song to make the Adult Contemporary Chart, stopping at No. 7. While the song was Milsap's only crossover success of the 1970s, he continued to achieve hits on the country music charts for the remainder of the decade.

=== Crossover success (1979–1992) ===
Milsap's sound shifted toward string-laden pop ballads during the late 1970s which resulted in crossover success on the pop charts beginning in the early 1980s. From 1980 until 1983, he scored a series of eleven No. 1 singles. Milsap's Greatest Hits album, released in 1980, included a new single, "Smoky Mountain Rain", which became a No. 1 smash on the country charts. The single peaked in the Top 20 on the pop music chart and also became the first of two Milsap songs to score No. 1 on the Adult Contemporary chart.

Other crossover successes included the Top 5 pop single, "(There's) No Gettin' Over Me", and two Top 20 songs in "I Wouldn't Have Missed It For the World" and "Any Day Now", the latter which lasted five weeks at No. 1 on Billboard's Adult Contemporary chart. He also had some success with "He Got You". All four songs reached No. 1 on the country music charts.

Although the series of No. 1 hits ended in 1983, the last song of the series, "Stranger in My House", was still successful on all three charts, peaking at No. 5 on the country music chart, No. 23 on the pop music chart, and No. 8 on the Adult Contemporary chart. Just a few months later, "Don't You Know How Much I Love You" was released, becoming Milsap's last significant entry on the pop music chart, stopping at No. 58. However it, along with others, still became major successes on the Adult Contemporary chart. These successful singles include "Show Her", "Still Losing You", and finally, the Grammy-winning song "Lost in the Fifties Tonight" (his last pop crossover success) in 1985.

Between 1985 and 1987, Milsap enjoyed a series of uninterrupted No. 1 country singles, enjoying great success at this time with "She Keeps the Home Fires Burning", "In Love", "Snap Your Fingers", "Where Do the Nights Go", and the Grammy-winning duet with Kenny Rogers, "Make No Mistake, She's Mine". In 1987, Milsap contributed the theme song to the short-lived NBC television series J.J. Starbuck.

In 1989, Milsap had his last No. 1 song with "A Woman in Love", although he still remained successful on the charts. Other Top 10 singles between 1989 and 1991 include "Houston Solution", "Stranger Things Have Happened", "Turn That Radio On", a remake of the 1950s hit "Since I Don't Have You" (his last adult contemporary hit) and "Are You Loving Me Like I'm loving You". With the help of writer Tom Carter, Milsap wrote and released his autobiography, titled Almost like a Song, in 1990.

In 1992, he had a major success with "All Is Fair in Love and War". The song featured rock guitarist Mark Knopfler on lead guitar and peaked at No. 11; his last top-40 country hit, "True Believer," peaked in 1993 at No. 30. By that time, however, Milsap's chart success began to decline.

=== Since 1993: Life today ===
Milsap has remained one of country music's most beloved performers despite a decline in radio airplay after the mid-1990s. In 1993, he released True Believer on Liberty Records and even as his contemporaries were no longer played on country radio, scored a Top 40 hit on the country chart with the title track. In 2000, he resurfaced with 40 No. 1 Hits, a two-disc retrospective which hit the Country Top 20 and earned gold certification. That same year, his life and career were profiled in an episode of Biography, reflecting on his musical legacy and crossover success.

In 2004, Milsap recorded Just for a Thrill, a collection of pop and jazz standards. The album marked a stylistic departure and earned a Grammy nomination. He returned to RCA Records in 2006 and a mainstream country sound with My Life. His two-disc gospel set Then Sings My Soul (2009) reached the Southern gospel charts, and Country Again (2011) reflected a more traditional country style.

In 2014, Rolling Stone included "Smoky Mountain Rain" among its 100 greatest country songs. That year, Milsap released Summer #17, an album of nostalgic pop and R&B covers.

He was among 30 artists featured on "Forever Country" in 2016, a mash-up honoring the 50th CMA Awards. In 2019, he returned to the charts with Ronnie Milsap: The Duets, featuring collaborations with Dolly Parton, Willie Nelson, George Strait, and others. A duet version of "Smoky Mountain Rain" with Parton reached the Adult Contemporary top 30.

On April 8, 2020, Craft Recordings announced that they've acquired the majority of Milsap’s catalog rights and masters from RCA, spanning from 1977 to 2006, which ultimately cultivated on the new Craft material compilation, The Best Of Ronnie Milsap. By 2020, Milsap had installed a new home studio and continued to record. His album A Better Word for Love followed in 2021. In 2022, he contributed “Oh, Lady Be Good!” to Michael Feinstein’s Gershwin Country, a tribute to George and Ira Gershwin and launched a podcast, Music and Milsap. That same year, he inducted Ray Charles into the Country Music Hall of Fame and was later inducted into the Memphis Music Hall of Fame.

Milsap’s final concert, for which he was joined by longtime collaborators and other country stars, took place October 3, 2023, at Bridgestone Arena in Nashville. The event marked the end of his touring career, several months after he celebrated his 80th birthday on stage at the Grand Ole Opry. Though retired from the road, he continues to record.

On February 24, 2026, Milsap was honored at the Opry for his 50th anniversary special, his first performance in three years since he retired from touring activities. The performance also featured multiple members like Ella Langley, Vince Gill, Blake Shelton, Keith Urban, Trace Adkins, and Mark Wills.

=== Amateur radio operator ===
Milsap is an Advanced-class amateur radio operator. His call sign is WB4KCG.

== Personal life ==
In 1965, Milsap married Joyce Reeves. They had one son, Ronald "Todd" Milsap, who was found dead on his houseboat at the age of 49 on February 23, 2019, from an apparent medical condition. Todd's son, who had not heard from his father for the previous two days, found the body. Joyce, who had been battling leukemia since 2014, died on September 6, 2021, at the age of 81.

== Discography ==
=== Studio albums ===
- Ronnie Milsap (1971)
- Where My Heart Is (1973)
- Pure Love (1974)
- A Legend in My Time (1975)
- Night Things (1975)
- 20/20 Vision (1976)
- It Was Almost Like a Song (1977)
- Only One Love in My Life (1978)
- Images (1979)
- Milsap Magic (1980)
- Out Where the Bright Lights Are Glowing (1981)
- There's No Gettin' Over Me (1981)
- Inside (1982)
- Keyed Up (1983)
- One More Try for Love (1984)
- Lost in the Fifties Tonight (1985)
- Christmas with Ronnie Milsap (1986)
- Heart and Soul (1987)
- Stranger Things Have Happened (1989)
- Back to the Grindstone (1991)
- True Believer (1993)
- Sings His Best Hits for Capitol Records (re-recordings of greatest hits, 1996)
- Just for a Thrill (2004)
- My Life (2006)
- Then Sings My Soul (2009)
- Country Again (2011)
- Summer Number Seventeen (2014)
- The Duets (2019)
- A Better Word for Love (2021)

== Industry awards and honors ==
Academy of Country Music

- 1982 Top Male Vocalist
- 1985 Song of the Year – "Lost in the Fifties Tonight"
- 1988 Instrumentalist of the Year, Keyboards
- 2002 Pioneer Award

Billboard

- 1980 No. 1 Country Song of the Year – "My Heart"
- 1985 No. 1 Country Song of the Year – "Lost in the Fifties Tonight"

Country Music Association

- 1974 Male Vocalist of the Year
- 1975 Album of the Year – A Legend in My Time
- 1976 Male Vocalist of the Year
- 1977 Album of the Year – Ronnie Milsap Live
- 1977 Entertainer of the Year
- 1977 Male Vocalist of the Year
- 1978 Album of the Year – It Was Almost Like a Song
- 1986 Album of the Year – Lost in the Fifties Tonight

Country Music Hall of Fame 2014 Inductee

Grammy Awards

- 1975 Best Male Country Vocal Performance – "Please Don't Tell Me How The Story Ends"
- 1977 Best Male Country Vocal Performance – "(I'm a) Stand by My Woman Man"
- 1982 Best Male Country Vocal Performance – "(There's) No Gettin' Over Me"
- 1986 Best Male Country Vocal Performance – "Lost in the Fifties Tonight"
- 1987 Best Male Country Vocal Performance – "Lost in the Fifties Tonight"
- 1988 Best Country Collaboration with Vocals – "Make No Mistake, She's Mine" (w/ Kenny Rogers)

Music City News Country

- 1975 Most Promising Male Artist

Miscellaneous achievements

- 40 No. 1 hits, 35 of which reached the top spot on the Billboard chart; the remaining 5 topped other trade charts, including Cashbox
- Over 35 million albums sold
- Inducted into the Grand Ole Opry in 1976
- Inducted into the North Carolina Music Hall of Fame in 2002
- Awarded the Career Achievement Award by Country Radio Seminar in 2006
- Awarded the 2007 Rocketown Legend Award

Other honors
On December 2, 2020, six miles of U.S. 129 in Graham County, North Carolina, from Yellow Creek near Robbinsville to the Swain County line, was designated Ronnie Milsap Highway.

== Bibliography ==
- Milsap, Ronnie; Carter, Tom (1990). Almost Like a Song. New York: McGraw-Hill. ISBN 978-0070423749.

== See also ==
- List of best selling music artists
