= The Definitive Collection (Allison Moorer album) =

Compilation album by Allison Moorer
- Released: January 7, 2005
- Genre: Country
- Length: 75:35
- Label: MCA Nashville

Allison Moorer chronology
The Duel (2004)	The Definitive Collection (2005)	Getting Somewhere (2006)

The Definitive Collection is a 2005 album compiled mostly from Allison Moorer's first five studio albums. Stephen Thomas Erlewine of AllMusic states that "The Definitive Collection is less of a hits album than a retrospective on an underappreciated artist."

== Critical reception ==
Professional ratings
Review scores
Source	Rating
AllMusic	4/5 stars
PopMatters	8/10 stars

Stephen Thomas Erlewine of AllMusic referencing Moorer's earlier studio albums says, "Each of these records is quite good on its own terms, but this makes for an excellent introduction for the curious, and The Definitive Collection a strong listen in its own right as well."

Michael Franco of PopMatters writes, "Overall, The Definitive Collection is an essential purchase for fans of country, alt-country, folk, and roots rock."

== Track listing ==
All tracks are written by Allison Moorer and Doyle Primm, unless otherwise noted.

No.	Title	Writer(s)	Original album	Length
1.	"A Soft Place to Fall"	Allison Moorer; Gwil Owen	Alabama Song (1998)	3:51
2.	"Long Black Train"		Alabama Song	4:26
3.	"Alabama Song"		Alabama Song	3:53
4.	"Set You Free"		Alabama Song	3:56
5.	"Easier to Forget"		Alabama Song	3:01
6.	"The Hardest Part"		The Hardest Part (2000)	3:12
7.	"Is It Worth It?"		The Hardest Part	3:21
8.	"Send Down an Angel"		The Hardest Part	3:47
9.	"I Ain't the One" (with Lonesome Bob & Los Straitjackets)	Jessi Colter	Los Straitjackets' album I Ain't the One (2001)	3:01
10.	"Moonshiner"	Traditional	Songcatcher Soundtrack (2001)	3:32
11.	"Tumbling Down"		Miss Fortune (2002)	4:18
12.	"Hey Jezebel"		Miss Fortune	4:27
13.	"Steal The Sun"		Miss Fortune	4:40
14.	"Dying Breed"		Miss Fortune	6:47
15.	"Storms Never Last"	Jessi Colter	Lonesome, On'ry And Mean (A Tribute To Waylon Jennings) (2003)	4:27
16.	"Don't Cry No Tears"	Neil Young	Show (2003)	2:39
17.	"Let Go"	Allison Moorer	Show	4:21
18.	"I'll Break Before I Bend"		Show	3:25
19.	"Is Heaven Good Enough for You" (Vocals – Shelby Lynne)		Show	4:31
Total length:				75:35

- Track information and credits adapted from the album's liner notes. Some details for original albums adapted from AllMusic.
