= Blood (Allison Moorer album) =

Studio album by Allison Moorer
- Released: October 25, 2019
- Recorded: 2018–19
- Studios: Ken's Gold Club and Hound's Ear Studio (Franklin, Tennessee); Blackbird Studio (Nashville, Tennessee)
- Genres: Americana, country folk, alternative country
- Length: 35:58
- Labels: Autotelic Records, Thirty Tigers
- Producer: Kenny Greenberg

Allison Moorer chronology
Not Dark Yet (2017)	Blood (2019)

Blood is the tenth studio album by singer-songwriter Allison Moorer. The album was released on October 25, 2019, and is her first release on her own record label Autotelic. The album was distributed by Thirty Tigers, who also distributed her 2017 duets album with her sister Shelby Lynne. It is a companion piece to Moorer's first autobiography Blood: A Memoir, which was released on October 29, 2019. Blood is Moorer's fourth album with producer Kenny Greenberg, who worked with her on her first two albums and on her 2015 release Down to Believing.

== Background ==
Like Down to Believing, her previous solo release, Blood (and its associated memoir) is a collection of tracks relating the emotions and trauma that Moorer and Lynne went through during their childhoods growing up in a troubled home in southern Alabama which ultimately resulted in the murder-suicide of their parents in 1986. Moorer stated that she considers these songs to be her most revealing, personal and finest works to date.

The song "I'm the One to Blame", the only track on the album not written by Moorer, was composed by her sister Shelby Lynne, who found the unfinished lyrics to the song in one of their father's briefcases.

The album features re-recordings of "Cold Cold Earth" which appeared as a hidden track (due to Moorer's unwillingness to address the topic openly on an album) on Moorer's second album The Hardest Part, and "Blood", which featured on her 2015 album Down to Believing.

The cover of the album is a photograph of Moorer as a child looking happy, with the cover of the memoir being a similar photograph that also included Shelby Lynne.

== Track listing ==
All tracks are written by Allison Moorer, except where noted.

No.	Title	Writer(s)	Length
1.	"Bad Weather"		4:27
2.	"Cold Cold Earth"		3:21
3.	"Nightlight"		4:19
4.	"The Rock and the Hill"		3:39
5.	"I'm the One to Blame"	Shelby Lynne, Vernon Franklin Moorer	2:28
6.	"Set My Soul Free"		3:09
7.	"The Ties That Bind"		3:54
8.	"All I Wanted (Thanks Anyway)"		3:34
9.	"Blood"		4:09
10.	"Heal"	Moorer, Mary Gauthier	3:04

== Personnel ==
Credits adapted from AllMusic.

- Allison Moorer – vocals, backing vocals, acoustic piano, acoustic guitars, kick drum, tambourine
- Jeff Linsenmaier – programming
- Kenny Greenberg – acoustic guitars, electric guitars, pedal steel guitar, bass
- Evan Hutchings – drums
- Luke Reynolds – tape loops
- Steve Patrick – trumpet
- Tammy Rogers – fiddle

=== Production ===
- Kenny Greenberg – producer, recording, engineer, mixing (8)
- Mills Logan – recording, engineer, mixing (8)
- Mike McCarthy – recording, engineer
- Michael Walter – recording, engineer
- Justin Niebank – mixing (1-7, 9, 10)
- Tony Castle – editing
- Jim DeMain – mastering at Yes Master (Nashville, Tennessee)
- Fetzer Design – design

== Commercial performance ==
The album debuted at No. 23 on the Heatseekers Albums chart. It sold 1,300 copies in the United States in the first two weeks. It has sold 2,100 copies in the United States as of December 2019.

== Tour ==
The album was preceded by the release of "All I Wanted (Thanks Anyway)" and acts as a companion to Moorer's memoir of the same name, which was released on October 29, 2019. Moorer embarked upon a special hybrid tour which incorporated conversation about the book with performances of songs from the record alongside some of her earlier hits. On this tour, she was joined by special moderators who joined her in conversation including her husband Hayes Carll, her sister Shelby Lynne, Paul Janeway, Kyle Tibbs Jones, Jennifer Palmieri, NPR Music's Melissa Block, songwriter Mary Gauthier and music journalist Mario Taradell.
