= Michael Rhodes (musician) =

American bass player (1953–2023)

Background information
- Born: September 16, 1953; Monroe, Louisiana, U.S.
- Died: March 4, 2023 (aged 69) Nashville, Tennessee, U.S.
- Genres: Rock, Country, Pop
- Occupation: Musician
- Instrument: Bass
- Years active: 1974–2023
- Website: michaelrhodesbass.com

Michael Rhodes (September 16, 1953 – March 4, 2023) was an American bass player, known for his session work and touring in support of other artists, and his collaborations in bands and ensembles.

== Biography ==
Rhodes was born in Monroe, Louisiana, and taught himself to play the guitar by age 13 and the bass soon after. In the early 1970s, Rhodes moved to Austin, Texas, where he performed with local bands. Four years later, Rhodes moved to Memphis, Tennessee, where he performed with Charlie Rich's son Alan.

In 1977, Rhodes moved to Nashville, and he joined local band The Nerve with Ricky Rector and Danny Rhodes. He worked as a demo musician for Tree Publishing Company, and then as a session player.

Rhodes joined Rodney Crowell, Steuart Smith, Eddie Bayers, and Vince Santoro in the Cicadas. They recorded one album in 1997, but had been playing together for more than a decade. Rhodes was also a member of the Notorious Cherry Bombs, with Crowell, Bayers, Vince Gill, Hank DeVito, and Richard Bennett.

Rhodes has contributed to the recordings of numerous artists, including Neal McCoy, Chely Wright, Pat McLaughlin Doug Stone, Wynonna Judd, Steve Winwood, Larry Carlton, the Dixie Chicks, Reba McEntire, Tanya Tucker, Hank Williams, Jr., Rosanne Cash, Vince Gill, J.J. Cale, Dolly Parton, Nito Mestre, Randy Travis, Faith Hill, Toby Keith, and Kenny Chesney.

He was an active sideman in recordings and touring of Joe Bonamassa.

Rhodes was inducted into the Musicians Hall of Fame and Museum in 2019.

Rhodes died on March 4, 2023, at the age of 69.

=== Collaborations ===
Besides session work, Rhodes was a member of several local bands who play frequently in Nashville-area venues:

- The Fortunate Sons, with Gary Nicholson, Kenny Greenberg, Chad Cromwell, and Reese Wynans.
- The Players, with Eddie Bayers (drums), John Hobbs (keyboards), Paul Franklin (steel guitar), and Brent Mason (guitar). They often perform with other artists, such as Vince Gill.
- The Vinyl Kings, playing original Beatles style music, with Jim Photoglo, Vince Melamed (keyboards), Larry Byrom (keyboards), Larry Lee (percussion), Josh Leo (guitar), and Harry Stinson (drums).
- TAR (Trapp, Abbott, and Rhodes), a power trio with Guthrie Trapp (guitar), and Pete Abbott (drums).
- The World Famous Headliners, led by Al Anderson, and featuring Shawn Camp, Pat McLaughlin, and Greg Morrow.

=== Awards ===
In 2016, Rhodes won Bass Player of the Year as awarded by the Academy of Country Music.

== Discography ==
=== With The Cicadas ===
- 1997: The Cicadas (Warner Bros.)

=== With the Vinyl Kings ===
- 2002: A Little Trip (self-released)
- 2005: Time Machine (self-released)

=== With The Notorious Cherry Bombs ===
- 2004: The Notorious Cherry Bombs (Universal South)

=== With The Players ===
- 2002: The Players (Medallion)
- 2004: Live in Nashville DVD (Image)

=== With the World Famous Headliners ===
- 2011: The World Famous Headliners (Big Yellow Dog)

=== Also appears on ===
==== 1979–1989 ====
- 1979: Irma Thomas - Safe With Me (RCS)
- 1981: J. J. Cale - Shades (Shelter)
- 1983: Dolly Parton - Burlap & Satin (RCA)
- 1984: Roanoke - A Little More Fire (Big Byte)
- 1985: John Anderson - Tokyo, Oklahoma (Warner Bros.)
- 1985: Robin Crow - Seven Seventy-Seven (Fortress)
- 1985: Mark Gray - That Feeling Inside (CBS)
- 1985: Restless Heart - Restless Heart (RCA)
- 1985: Dan Seals - Won't Be Blue Anymore (EMI America)
- 1986: Billy Crockett - Surprises in Disguises (Dayspring)
- 1986: Larry Howard - Sanctified Blues (Refuge)
- 1986: John Jarvis - So Fa So Good (MCA)
- 1986: Michael Martin Murphey - Tonight We Ride (Warner Bros.)
- 1986: Sweethearts of the Rodeo - Sweethearts of the Rodeo (album) (CBS)
- 1986: Randy Travis - Storms of Life (Warner Bros.)
- 1986: Hank Williams, Jr. - Montana Cafe (Warner Bros.)
- 1987: Rosanne Cash - King's Record Shop (Columbia)
- 1987: Michael Martin Murphey - Americana (Warner Bros.)
- 1987: Ricky Van Shelton - Wild-Eyed Dream (Columbia)
- 1987: Wendy Waldman - Letters Home (Cypress)
- 1987: Hank Williams Jr. - Born To Boogie (Warner Bros.)
- 1988: Alabama - Southern Star (RCA)
- 1988: John Anderson - 10 (MCA)
- 1988: Rodney Crowell - Diamonds & Dirt (Columbia)
- 1988: J. C. Crowley - Beneath the Texas Moon (RCA)
- 1988: Lonnie Mack - Roadhouses and Dance Halls (Epic)
- 1988: The McCarters - The Gift (Warner Bros.)
- 1988: Delbert McClinton - I'm With You (Curb)
- 1988: Hank Williams Jr. - Wild Streak (Warner Bros.)
- 1989: Rodney Crowell - Keys to the Highway (Columbia)
- 1989: Kenny Rogers - Something Inside So Strong (Reprise)
- 1989: Almir Sater - Rasta Bonito (Continental)
- 1989: Juice Newton - Ain't Gonna Cry (RCA)

==== 1990–1992 ====
- 1990: Joe Barnhill - Joe Barnhill (Capitol)
- 1990: Rosanne Cash - Interiors (Columbia)
- 1990: Larry Gatlin and the Gatlin Brothers - Cookin' Up a Storm (Capitol Nashville)
- 1990: Etta James - Stickin' to My Guns (Island)
- 1990: Larry Knechtel - Urban Gypsy (Capitol Nashville)
- 1990: Reba McEntire - Rumor Has It (MCA)
- 1990: Kenny Rogers - Love is Strange (Reprise)
- 1990: Jill Sobule - Things Here Are Different (MCA)
- 1990: Steve Wariner - Laredo (MCA)
- 1990: Paul David Wells - Sounds Good to Me (Capitol Nashville)
- 1990: Beth Nielsen Chapman - Beth Nielsen Chapman (Reprise)
- 1990: Steve Winwood - Refugees of the Heart (Virgin)
- 1991: Glen Campbell - Unconditional Love (Capitol Nashville)
- 1991: Lionel Cartwright - Chasin' the Sun (MCA)
- 1991: Brendan Croker - The Great Indoors (BMG)
- 1991: Vince Gill - Pocket Full of Gold (MCA)
- 1991: Green On Red - Scapegoats (China)
- 1991: Alan Jackson - Don't Rock the Jukebox (Arista)
- 1991: Lorrie Morgan - Something in Red (RCA)
- 1991: Kenny Rogers - Back Home Again (Reprise)
- 1991: Bob Seger and the Silver Bullet Band - The Fire Inside (Capitol)
- 1991: Les Taylor - Blue Kentucky Wind (Epic)
- 1991: Marsha Thornton - Maybe the Moon Will Shine (MCA)
- 1992: Confederate Railroad - Confederate Railroad (Atlantic)
- 1992: Robin Crow - Electric Cinema (Rendezvous Entertainment)
- 1992: Rodney Crowell - Life Is Messy (Columbia)
- 1992: Reba McEntire - It's Your Call (MCA)

==== 1993–1995 ====
- 1993: Larry Carlton - Renegade Gentleman (GRP) featuring Terry McMillan
- 1993: Beth Nielsen Chapman - You Hold the Key (Reprise)
- 1993: Darryl & Don Ellis - Day In the Sun (Epic)
- 1993: Faith Hill - Take Me as I Am (Warner Bros.)
- 1993: Elton John - Duets (MCA)
- 1993: October Project - October Project (Epic)
- 1993: Steve Wariner - Drive (Arista)
- 1993: Kelly Willis - Kelly Willis (MCA)
- 1993: Ronnie Milsap - True Believer (Liberty)
- 1994: Eugene Chadbourne - Another Country (House of Chadula)
- 1994: Vince Gill - When Love Finds You (MCA)
- 1994: Nanci Griffith - Flyer (Elektra)
- 1994: Highwaymen - The Road Goes On Forever (Liberty)
- 1994: Neal McCoy - No Doubt About It (Atlantic)
- 1994: Pearl River - Pearl River (Liberty)
- 1994: Clay Walker - If I Could Make a Living (Giant)
- 1994: Tammy Wynette - Without Walls (Epic)
- 1995: Peter Cetera - One Clear Voice (River North)
- 1995: Kenny Chesney - All I Need to Know (BNA)
- 1995: Ashley Cleveland - Lesson of Love (Reunion)
- 1995: Confederate Railroad - When and Where (Atlantic)
- 1995: Lonestar - Lonestar (BMG)
- 1995: Shelby Lynne - Restless (Magnatone)
- 1995: Rita MacNeil - Porch Songs (EMI)
- 1995: Ronna Reeves - After the Dance (River North)
- 1995: Victoria Shaw - In Full View (Reprise)
- 1995: The Highwaymen - The Road Goes On Forever (Liberty/Capitol Nashville/EMI)

==== 1996–1997 ====
- 1996: John Berry - Faces (Capitol Nashville)
- 1996: Brooks & Dunn - Borderline (Arista)
- 1996: Tracy Byrd - Big Love (MCA)
- 1996: Eugene Chadbourne - The Acquaduct (Rectangle)
- 1996: Terri Clark - Just the Same (Mercury)
- 1996: Ty England - Two Ways to Fall (RCA)
- 1996: Tammy Graham - Tammy Graham (Career)
- 1996: Mark Knopfler - Golden Heart (Vertigo)
- 1996: John Michael Montgomery - What I Do the Best (Atlantic)
- 1996: Kenny Rogers - The Gift (Magnatone)
- 1996: Marty Stuart - Honky Tonkin's What I Do Best (MCA)
- 1996: Shawn Colvin - A Few Small Repairs (Columbia)
- 1997: Sherrié Austin - Words (Arista Nashville)
- 1997: Clint Black - Nothin' But the Taillights (RCA)
- 1997: Beth Nielsen Chapman - Sand and Water (Reprise)
- 1997: Mark Chesnutt - Thank God for Believers (Decca)
- 1997: John Fogerty - Blue Moon Swamp (Warner Bros.)
- 1997: Richie Furay - In My Father's House (Calvary Chapel)
- 1997: Matt King - Five O'Clock Hero (Atlantic)
- 1997: Etta James - Love's Been Rough on Me (Private Music)
- 1997: The Kinleys - Just Between You and Me (Epic)
- 1997: Brent Mason - Hot Wired (Mercury)
- 1997: Terry McMillan - Somebody's Comin (Giant)
- 1997: Jim Messina - Watching the River Run (River Run)
- 1997: Regina Regina - Regina Regina (Giant)
- 1997: Joan Baez - Gone From Danger (Guardian)
- 1997: LeAnn Rimes - You Light Up My Life: Inspirational Songs (Curb)
- 1997: Bryan White - The Right Place (Asylum)
- 1997: Chely Wright - Let Me In (MCA Nashville)

==== 1998–1999 ====
- 1998: Brooks & Dunn - If You See Her (Arista Nashville)
- 1998: Deana Carter - Everything's Gonna Be Alright (Capitol Nashville)
- 1998: Confederate Railroad - Keep On Rockin' (Atlantic)
- 1998: Dixie Chicks - Wide Open Spaces (Monument)
- 1998: Jim Collins - The Next Step (Arista Nashville)
- 1998: Wade Hayes - When the Wrong One Loves You Right (Columbia)
- 1998: Sarah Masen - Carry Us Through (re:think)
- 1998: Allison Moorer - Alabama Song (MCA Nashville)
- 1998: Collin Raye - The Walls Came Down (Epic)
- 1998: Tracy Nelson - I Feel So Good (Rounder)
- 1998: Olivia Newton-John - Back with a Heart (MCA Nashville)
- 1998: LeAnn Rimes - Sittin' on Top of the World (Curb)
- 1998: Connie Smith - Connie Smith (Warner Bros.)
- 1998: Hank Williams, Jr. - Lone Wolf (Warner Bros.)
- 1998: Brian Wilson - Imagination (Giant)
- 1999: Carolyn Arends - This Much I Understand (Reunion)
- 1999: Mark Chesnutt - I Don't Want to Miss a Thing (Decca)
- 1999: Dixie Chicks - Fly (Monument)
- 1999: Alan Jackson - Under the Influence (Arista Nashville)
- 1999: Michael Bolton - Timeless: The Classics Vol. 2 (Columbia)
- 1999: Matt King - Hard Country (Atlantic)
- 1999: Darrell Scott - Family Tree (Sugar Hill)
- 1999: Steve Wariner - Two Teardrops (Capitol)

==== 2000–2002 ====
- 2000: Alabama - When It All Goes South (RCA)
- 2000: Andrew Gold - The Spence Manor Suite (Dome)
- 2000: The Kinleys - II (Epic)
- 2000: Richard Marx - Days in Avalon (Signal 21)
- 2000: Allison Moorer - The Hardest Part (MCA Nashville)
- 2000: Terry Radigan - Radigan (Vanguard)
- 2000: Eddy Raven - Living in Black and White (RMG)
- 2000: Kenny Rogers - There You Go Again (Dreamcatcher)
- 2000: Jill Sobule - Pink Pearl (Beyond)
- 2000: Ilse DeLange - Livin' on Love (WEA)
- 2000: David Wilcox - What You Whispered (Vanguard)
- 2000: Lee Ann Womack - I Hope You Dance (MCA Nashville)
- 2001: Jim Brickman - Simple Things (Windham Hill)
- 2001: Gary Allan - Alright Guy (MCA Nashville)
- 2001: Shawn Colvin - Whole New You (Columbia)
- 2001: Brooks & Dunn - Steers & Stripes (Arista Nashville)
- 2001: Cindy Bullens - Neverland (Artemis)
- 2001: Rodney Crowell - The Houston Kid (Sugar Hill)
- 2001: Billy Gilman - Dare to Dream (Epic)
- 2001: Hal Ketchum - Lucky Man (Curb)
- 2001: George Strait - The Road Less Traveled (MCA Nashville)
- 2002: Blackhawk - Spirit Dancer (Columbia)
- 2002: Kenny Chesney - No Shoes, No Shirt, No Problems (BNA]
- 2002: Amy Grant - Legacy... Hymns and Faith (A&M)
- 2002: Toby Keith - Unleashed (DreamWorks)
- 2002: Aaron Lines - Living Out Loud (RCA)
- 2002: Siobhan Maher Kennedy - Immigrant Flower (BMG)
- 2002: Shana Morrison - 7 Wishes (Vanguard)
- 2002: Todd Sharp - Walking All the Way (WannaPlay)

==== 2003–2005 ====
- 2003: Gary Allan - See If I Care (MCA Nashville)
- 2003: Larry Carlton - Sapphire Blue (Bluebird)
- 2003: Rodney Crowell - Fate's Right Hand (Epic)
- 2003: Billy Ray Cyrus - The Other Side (Word Entertainment)
- 2003: Dixie Chicks - Top of the World Tour: Live (Columbia)
- 2003: Willie Nelson - Live and Kickin' (Lost Highway)
- 2003: Owsley - The Hard Way (Lakeview)
- 2003: Blake Shelton - The Dreamer (Warner Bros. Nashville)
- 2003: Rosanne Cash - Rules of Travel (Capitol)
- 2003: Ian Wallace - Happiness with Minimal Side Effects (Voiceprint)
- 2003: Anna Wilson - The Long Way (Curb)
- 2004: Randall Bramblett - Thin Places (New West)
- 2004: Andy Griggs - This I Gotta See (RCA)
- 2004: Charlie Major - Inside Out (Stony Plain)
- 2004: Montgomery Gentry - You Do Your Thing (Columbia)
- 2004: Willie Nelson - It Always Will Be (Lost Highway)
- 2004: Brian Wilson - Gettin' In Over My Head (Rhino)
- 2004: Gretchen Wilson - Here for the Party (Epic)
- 2005: Brooks & Dunn - Hillbilly Deluxe (Arista Nashville)
- 2005: Kenny Chesney - The Road and the Radio (BNA)
- 2005: Rodney Crowell - The Outsider (Sony)
- 2005: Jace Everett - Jace Everett (Epic)
- 2005: Merle Haggard - Chicago Wind (Nashville)
- 2005: Chuck Leavell - Southscape (Evergreen Arts)
- 2005: George Strait - Somewhere Down in Texas (MCA Nashville)
- 2005: Van Zant - Get Right with the Man (Columbia)
- 2005: Gretchen Wilson - All Jacked Up (Epic)

==== 2006–2009 ====
- 2006: Trace Adkins - Dangerous Man (Capitol Nashville)
- 2006: Rosanne Cash - Black Cadillac (Capitol)
- 2006: Jon Christopher Davis - Jon Christopher Davis (Palo Duro Records)
- 2006: Richie Furay - The Heartbeat Of Love (Always An Adventure)
- 2006: Mindy Smith - “Long Island Shores” (Vanguard)
- 2006: Vince Gill - These Days (MCA Nashville)
- 2006: India.Arie - Testimony: Vol. 1, Life & Relationship (Motown)
- 2006: Chris Knight - Enough Rope (Thirty Tigers)
- 2006: Kenny Rogers - Water & Bridges (EMI)
- 2006: Bob Seger - Face the Promise (Capitol)
- 2007: Brooks & Dunn - Cowboy Town (Arista Nashville)
- 2007: Solomon Burke - Live in Nashville (Snapper)
- 2007: Ty Herndon - Right About Now (Pyramid)
- 2007: Anne Murray - Anne Murray Duets: Friends & Legends (EMI)
- 2007: Willie Nelson, Merle Haggard, and Ray Price - Last of the Breed (Lost Highway)
- 2007: Van Zant - My Kind of Country (Sony BMG)
- 2007: Gretchen Wilson - One of the Boys (Sony BMG Nashville)
- 2008: Stevie Nicks - The Soundstage Sessions (Reprise)
- 2008: Darius Rucker - Learn to Live (Capitol / EMI)
- 2009: Ashley Cleveland - God Don't Never Change (Koch)
- 2009: Lynyrd Skynyrd - God & Guns (Roadrunner)

==== 2010–2012 ====
- 2010: Gary Allan - Get Off on the Pain (MCA Nashville)
- 2010: Buddy Guy - Living Proof (Silvertone)
- 2010: Toby Keith - Bullets in the Gun (Show Dog-Universal Music)
- 2010: Darius Rucker - Charleston, SC 1966 (EMI)
- 2010: Trailer Choir - Tailgate (Show Dog-Universal)
- 2010: Chely Wright - Lifted Off the Ground (Vanguard)
- 2010: Amy Grant - Somewhere Down the Road (EMI)
- 2011: Larry Carlton and Tak Matsumoto - Take Your Pick (335 Records)
- 2011: Vince Gill - Guitar Slinger (MCA Nashville)
- 2011: Toby Keith - Clancy's Tavern (Hump Head)
- 2011: Martina McBride - Eleven (Republic Nashville)
- 2011: Stevie Nicks - In Your Dreams (Reprise)
- 2011: John Oates - Mississippi Mile (PS Records)
- 2011: Joe Bonamassa - Dust Bowl (J&R)
- 2011: Diane Schuur - The Gathering (Vanguard)
- 2011: Joss Stone - LP1 (Stone'd)
- 2011: Jake Owen - Barefoot Blue Jean Night (RCA Nashville)
- 2012: The Beach Boys - That's Why God Made the Radio (Capitol)
- 2012: Dierks Bentley - Home (Capitol Nashville)
- 2012: Kix Brooks - New to This Town (Arista Nashville)
- 2012: Troy Cassar-Daley - Home (Liberation Music)
- 2012: Kenny Chesney - Welcome to the Fishbowl (Columbia Nashville)
- 2012: Terri Clark - Classic (Hump Head)
- 2012: Buddy Guy - Live at Legends (Silvertone)
- 2012: Beth Hart - Bang Bang Boom Boom (Provogue)
- 2012: Aaron Lewis - The Road (Blaster)
- 2012: Joe Bonamassa - Driving Towards the Daylight (J&R)
- 2012: Grace Potter and the Nocturnals - The Lion the Beast the Beat (Hollywood)
- 2012: Lionel Richie - Tuskegee (Mercury)
- 2012: David A. Stewart - The Ringmaster General (Surfdog)

==== 2013–2014 ====
- 2013: Trace Adkins - Love Will... (Show Dog Nashville)
- 2013: Gary Allan - Set You Free (MCA Nashville)
- 2013: Joe Bonamassa - Tour de Force: Live in London - Hammersmith Apollo (Provogue)
- 2013: Buddy Guy - Rhythm & Blues (RCA / Silvertone)
- 2013: Emmylou Harris and Rodney Crowell - Old Yellow Moon (Nonesuch)
- 2013: Beth Hart and Joe Bonamassa - Seesaw (J&R Adventures)
- 2013: Jennifer Holliday - The Song is You (Shanachie)
- 2013: Toby Keith - Drinks After Work (Show Dog-Universal Music)
- 2013: Lady Antebellum - Golden (Capitol Nashville)
- 2013: Ashley Monroe - Like a Rose (Warner Bros. Nashville)
- 2013: Kenny Rogers - You Can't Make Old Friends (Warner Bros.)
- 2013: David A. Stewart - Lucky Numbers (Weapons Of Mass Entertainment)
- 2013: George Strait - Love is Everything (MCA Nashville)
- 2014: Jimmy Barnes - 30:30 Hindsight (Mushroom / Freight Train)
- 2014: Joe Bonamassa - Different Shades of Blue (Provogue)
- 2014: The Common Linnets - The Common Linnets (Firefly / Universal Music)
- 2014: Rodney Crowell - Tarpaper Sky (New West)
- 2014: Stevie Nicks - 24 Karat Gold: Songs from the Vault (Reprise)
- 2014: Lady Antebellum - 747 (Capitol Nashville)
- 2014: John Oates - Good Road to Follow (PS Records / Elektra Nashville)
- 2014: Billy Joe Shaver - Long in the Tooth (Lightning Rod)
- 2014: Big & Rich - Gravity (Big & Rich Records)

==== 2015–2023 ====
- 2015: Clint Black - On Purpose (Blacktop)
- 2015: Buddy Guy - Born to Play Guitar (Silvertone)
- 2015: Toby Keith - 35 MPH Town (Show Dog Nashville)
- 2015: Reba McEntire - Love Somebody (Starstruck / Nash Icon)
- 2015: Ashley Monroe - The Blade (Warner Music Nashville)
- 2015: Allison Moorer - Down to Believing (Proper)
- 2015: Carrie Underwood - Storyteller (Arista Nashville / 19 Recordings)
- 2015: Brian Wilson - No Pier Pressure (Capitol)
- 2015: Jewel - Picking Up the Pieces (Sugar Hill)
- 2015: Don Henley - Cass County (Past Masters Holdings, Capitol Records) "Praying for Rain" track
- 2016: Garth Brooks and Trisha Yearwood - Christmas Together (Gwendolyn / Pearl)
- 2016: Vince Gill - Down to My Last Bad Habit (MCA)
- 2016: Charles Kelley - The Driver (Capitol Nashville)
- 2016: Joanne Shaw Taylor - Wild (Axehouse)
- 2016: Joe Bonamassa - Blues of Desperation (J&R)
- 2017: Rodney Crowell - Close Ties (New West)
- 2017: Michael McDonald - Wide Open (Chonin/BMG) "Free a Man" track
- 2018: Joe Bonamassa - British Blues Explosion LIVE (J&R)
- 2018: Beth Hart and Joe Bonamassa - Black Coffee (J&R)
- 2018: Joe Bonamassa - Redemption (Provogue)
- 2019: Rodney Crowell - Texas (RC1)
- 2020: Joe Bonamassa - Royal Tea (Provogue)
