= Show (Allison Moorer album) =

Live album by Allison Moorer
- Released: June 24, 2003
- Venue: 12th & Porter, Nashville, Tennessee
- Genre: Country
- Length: 74:14
- Label: Universal South
- Producer: R.S. Field

Allison Moorer chronology
Miss Fortune (2002)	Show (2003)	The Duel (2004)

Professional ratings
Review scores
Source	Rating
AllMusic	4/5 stars

Show is a live album by Allison Moorer, released June 24, 2003. The album peaked at No. 49 on the Billboard Top Country Albums chart in July 2003. According to Vogue, this album features the first recorded collaboration between Moorer and her sister, Shelby Lynne.

== Critical reception ==
Thom Jurek of AllMusic begins his review with, "On Show, singer/songwriter Allison Moorer follows up her stellar Miss Fortune album with a live collection recorded at Music City's famed 12th & Porter. Playing songs drawn from her three previous studio outings, she also includes a tough and trashy version of Neil Young's barroom classic "Don't Cry No Tears."" and concludes with "In sum, this is how live records should be made."

No Depression reviews the album and writes, "Culled from two sets at Nashville’s 12th & Porter nightclub on January 4 of this year (2003), the disc presents Moorer in a mostly unfettered setting that lets her musical starlight shine. The backing is somewhat slick but mainly just exquisite, and producer R.S. Field coaxes a studio-worthy sound out of a live setup."

== Track listing ==
All tracks are written by Allison Moorer and Doyle Primm unless otherwise noted.

No.	Title	Writer(s)	Length
1.	"Day You Said Goodbye"	Allison Moorer; Doyle Primm	5:46
2.	"Don't Cry No Tears"	Neil Young	2:52
3.	"Alabama Song"		3:55
4.	"A Soft Place To Fall"	Allison Moorer; Gwil Owen	4:15
5.	"Yessirree"		5:29
6.	"I'll Break Before I Bend"		3:19
7.	"Let Go"	Allison Moorer	4:27
8.	"Steal The Sun"		5:38
9.	"Bring Me All Your Lovin'" (Vocals – Shelby Lynne)	Allison Moorer; Doyle Primm; Kenny Greenberg	5:48
10.	"Is Heaven Good Enough For You" (Vocals – Shelby Lynne)		5:24
11.	"Going Down" (Vocals – Shelby Lynne)		4:16
12.	"Send Down An Angel"		3:58
13.	"Dying Breed"		6:03
14.	"No Next Time" (Vocals – Lonesome Bob)		7:42
15.	"Bully Jones" (Vocals – Kid Rock)		5:22
Total length:			74:14

== Personnel ==
=== Musicians ===
- Allison Moorer – vocals, guitars
- Eric Holt – keyboards, vocals
- Pete Finney – guitars, pedal steel guitar
- Joe McMahan – guitars
- R.S. Fields – guitar (11)
- Jared Reynolds – bass, vocals
- Paul Griffith – drums
- Manfred Jerome – percussion
- Shelby Lynne – vocals (9-11)
- Lonesome Bob – vocals (14)
- Kid Rock – vocals (15)

=== Production ===
- R.S. Fields – producer
- Doyle Lee Primm – associate producer
- Timothy R. Powell for Metro Mobile (Glenview, Illinois) – recording
- Mike Czaszwicz – recording assistant
- Michael Ways – recording assistant
- Chris Henning – transfers
- Michael Bracy – FOH engineer
- Russ Long – mixing at The Carport (Nashville, Tennessee)
- Jim DeMain – mastering at Yes Master (Nashville, Tennessee)
- Billy Gosser – guitar technician
- Bill Tyler – art direction
- Thomas Petillo – photography
- Deep South Entertainment – management

DVD credits

- Stephen Shepherd – director, producer
- Baquas – producer
- Russ Long – audio mixing at Recording Arts and Cartee 3 Studios (Nashville, Tennessee)

Track information and credits adapted from the album's liner notes.

== Charts ==
Chart (2003)	Peak position
US Top Country Albums (Billboard)	49
