= Mockingbird (Allison Moorer album) =

Studio album by Allison Moorer
- Released: February 18, 2008
- Studio: Dogtown Studio (Nashville, Tennessee)
- Genre: Folk
- Length: 47:38
- Label: New Line Records
- Producer: Buddy Miller

Allison Moorer chronology
Getting Somewhere (2006)	Mockingbird (2008)	Crows (2010)

Professional ratings
Review scores
Source	Rating
AllMusic	4/5 stars
American Songwriter	3/5 stars
Slant Magazine	3.5/5 stars
Austin Chronicle	3/5 stars

Mockingbird is an album of covers by Allison Moorer released in 2008. Moorer covers songs by Nina Simone, Patti Smith, Cat Power, June Carter Cash, Joni Mitchell, as well as her sister Shelby Lynne.

== Critical reception ==
Mockingbird was produced by Buddy Miller. In his review for AllMusic, Thom Jurek wrote that it "is a natural sounding set of covers that runs the gamut from rock and barrelhouse blues, to jazz, country, and traditional and indie folk." The title track, the only original song on the album, written by Moorer, is "a breezy acoustic ballad." Moore's rendition of Patti Smith's 'Dancing Barefoot' "has to be heard to be believed" and is "a contender for best track on the set." After raving over Moorer's creative and emotional interpretations of many of the album's other tracks, Jurek concludes by claiming that Mockingbird is her "warmest, most ambitious, and gutsy record yet."

Holly Gleason of American Songwriter writes, "Strength has always been Oscar-nominee Allison Moorer’s suit-and at a time when she enlists roots wizard Buddy Miller to ply an even more organic stew of instruments, the Alabama-born singer/songwriter makes herself even more vulnerable by jettisoning what she knows for what she feels, thinks, believes."

Jonathan Keefe of Slant Magazine says, "Moorer belongs in any serious conversation about the finest vocalists in modern popular music, and Mockingbird gives her ample opportunities to showcase her interpretive skills and to push herself in new directions."

Jim Caligiuri of the Austin Chronicle concludes his review with, "With only one self-penned song, the title track, Moorer's songwriting career is seemingly on hold. The effortless Mockingbird proves she doesn't need to write to make music that's all her own."

Metacritic gives the album a 67 Metascore based on 12 official critic reviews.

== Track listing ==
No.	Title	Writer(s)	Length
1.	"Mockingbird"	Allison Moorer	3:18
2.	"Ring of Fire"	June Carter Cash, Merle Kilgore	3:01
3.	"Dancing Barefoot"	Jay Dee Daugherty, Ivan Král, Patti Smith	4:21
4.	"I Want a Little Sugar in My Bowl"	Nina Simone	2:38
5.	"Go, Leave"	Kate McGarrigle	3:40
6.	"Revelator"	David Rawlings, Gillian Welch	5:44
7.	"Both Sides Now"	Joni Mitchell	4:31
8.	"Daddy Goodbye Blues"	Thomas Dorsey	3:59
9.	"She Knows Where She Goes"	Bill Bottrell, Shelby Lynne	4:20
10.	"Orphan Train"	Julie Miller	5:45
11.	"Where Is My Love"	Chan Marshall	3:26
12.	"I'm Looking for Blue Eyes"	Jessi Colter	2:57
Total length:			47:40

== Personnel ==
- Allison Moorer – vocals, programming (2), electric guitar (2), backing vocals (2, 3, 6), acoustic guitar (4–7, 9, 11, 12)
- Phil Madeira – keyboards (1, 3, 4, 7), accordion (5)
- John Deaderick – keyboards (2, 3, 6, 11)
- Richard Bennett – acoustic guitar (1, 4, 7, 9), electric guitar (3, 6)
- Buddy Miller – electric guitar (1, 3, 4, 6, 7), acoustic guitar (9, 12), glockenspiel (9), percussion (10), backing vocals (10, 12)
- Steve Earle – electric guitar (8)
- Russ Pahl – steel guitar (1, 2, 9, 11)
- Mike Compton – mandolin (8)
- Tim O'Brien – banjo (10)
- Darrell Scott – bouzouki (10)
- Chris Donohue – bass (1–4, 6, 7, 9, 10, 12)
- Kenny Malone – drums (1, 4, 7, 9, 10), percussion (1, 4, 7, 9, 10)
- Bryan Owings – drums (3, 6, 8)
- Jim Hoke – saxophone (1)
- Neil Rosengarden – trumpet (7)
- Chris Carmichael – strings (2, 5), string arrangements (2, 5)
- Tammy Rogers – fiddle (6)
- Ann McCrary – backing vocals (1, 6)
- Regina McCrary – backing vocals (1, 6)
- Julie Miller – backing vocals (10)

The Nashville String Machine (Tracks 1, 7 & 11)

- Tom Howard – string arrangements and conductor
- Carole Rabinowitz-Neuen – cello
- Jim Grosjean – viola
- Conni Ellisor – violin
- Pam Sixfin – violin

== Production ==
- Buddy Miller – producer, mixing, additional engineer, mastering
- Mike Poole – recording
- Cole Gerst – artwork, design
- Thomas Petillo – photography
- Jesse Bauer – management
- Danny Goldberg – management
- Frank Riley with High Road Touring – booking (US and Pacific Rim)
- Paul Fenn with Asgard, Ltd. – booking (everywhere else)
- Kent Marcus – legal

== Chart performance ==
Chart (2008)	Peak position
US Heatseekers Albums (Billboard)	18
US Independent Albums (Billboard)	44
