= If the Jukebox Took Teardrops =

"If the Jukebox Took Teardrops" may refer to one of two songs:

- "If the Jukebox Took Teardrops", by Billy Joe Royal from the album Out of the Shadows
- "If the Jukebox Took Teardrops", by Mike Henderson from the album Country Music Made Me Do It; also recorded by Danni Leigh on the album 29 Nights
