= Born to Play Guitar =

Studio album by Buddy Guy
- Released: July 31, 2015
- Genre: Blues
- Length: 59:10
- Label: RCA
- Producer: Tom Hambridge

Buddy Guy chronology
Rhythm & Blues (2013)	Born to Play Guitar (2015)	The Blues Is Alive and Well (2018)

Professional ratings
Aggregate scores
Source	Rating
Metacritic	76/100
Review scores
Source	Rating
AllMusic	3/5 stars
Robert Christgau	(2-star Honorable Mention)
Classic Rock	3.5/5 stars
Rolling Stone	3.5/5 stars

Born to Play Guitar is the 17th studio album by American blues musician Buddy Guy, released in 2015. It peaked at No. 60 on the Billboard 200 and reached No. 1 on the Billboard Blues Albums chart on August 22, 2015.

The album won the Grammy Award for Best Blues Album in 2016.

== Track listing ==
No.	Title	Writer(s)	Length
1.	"Born to Play Guitar"	Richard Fleming, Tom Hambridge	4:56
2.	"Wear You Out" (featuring Billy Gibbons)	Tom Hambridge, Gary Nicholson	3:30
3.	"Back Up Mama"	Richard Fleming, Tom Hambridge	4:42
4.	"Too Late" (featuring Kim Wilson)	Charles Brown, Willie Dixon, John Phillips	2:46
5.	"Whiskey, Beer & Wine"	Buddy Guy, Tom Hambridge	4:30
6.	"Kiss Me Quick" (featuring Kim Wilson)	Richard Fleming, Tom Hambridge	2:55
7.	"Crying Out of One Eye"	Buddy Guy, Tom Hambridge	4:01
8.	"(Baby) You Got What It Takes" (featuring Joss Stone)	Brook Benton, Clyde Otis, Murray Stein	3:17
9.	"Turn Me Wild"	Buddy Guy, Tom Hambridge	4:36
10.	"Crazy World"	Buddy Guy, Tom Hambridge, Gary Nicholson	5:15
11.	"Smarter Than I Was"	Tom Hambridge	5:27
12.	"Thick Like Mississippi Mud"	Buddy Guy, Tom Hambridge	4:03
13.	"Flesh & Bone (Dedicated to B.B. King)" (featuring Van Morrison)	Tom Hambridge, Gary Nicholson	4:01
14.	"Come Back Muddy"	Richard Fleming, Tom Hambridge	5:11

== Personnel ==
Musicians

- Buddy Guy - electric guitar, acoustic guitar, vocals
- Tom Hambridge - Drums, Percussion, Tambourine, Triangle, Wind Chimes, Background Vocals
- Doyle Bramhall II - 12 String Acoustic Guitar, Electric Guitar
- Rob McNelley - Electric Guitar, Resonator Guitar, Slide Guitar
- Kenny Greenberg - Electric Guitar
- Bob Britt - Electric Guitar, Resonator Guitar
- Billy Cox - Electric Bass
- Glenn Worf - Electric Bass, Upright Bass
- Michael Rhodes - Acoustic Bass, Electric Bass
- Tommy Macdonald - Electric Bass
- Reese Wynans - Clavinet, Hammond B3, Grand Piano, Upright Piano, Wurlitzer
- Kevin McKendree - African Piano, Hammond B3, Piano
- Rob McKendree - Clavinet
- The McCrary Sisters - Background Vocals
- Chris Carmichael - strings, string arrangement

Guest musicians

- Billy Gibbons - guitar, vocals
- Kim Wilson - harmonica
- Joss Stone - vocals
- Van Morrison - vocals

Production

- Tom Hambridge - Producer, Composer, Mixing
- Ducky Carlisle - Engineer, Mixing
- Michael Saint-Leon - Engineer
- Jonathan Joseph - Engineer
- Nathan James - Engineer
- Seth Morton - Assistant Engineer
- Roger Seibel - Mastering
- Erwin Gorostiza Creative Director
- Tommy Macdonald - Production Assistant
- Gilbert Garza - Guitar Technician
- Josh Cheuse - Art Direction, Design, Photography
- Bradley Cook - Cover Photo

== Charts ==
Chart (2015)	Peak position
Australian Albums (ARIA)	47
Belgian Albums (Ultratop Flanders)	84
Belgian Albums (Ultratop Wallonia)	37
French Albums (SNEP)	104
German Albums (Offizielle Top 100)	78
Dutch Albums (Album Top 100)	30
Swiss Albums (Schweizer Hitparade)	13
UK Albums (OCC)	100
US Billboard 200	60
US Top Blues Albums (Billboard)	1
US Indie Store Album Sales (Billboard)	8
