= Crows (album) =

Studio album by Allison Moorer
- Released: February 9, 2010
- Studio: House of David (Nashville, Tennessee)
- Genre: Folk, Country Pop
- Length: 48:07
- Label: Rykodisc
- Producer: R.S. Field

Allison Moorer chronology
Mockingbird (2008)	Crows (2010)	Down to Believing (2015)

Professional ratings
Aggregate scores
Source	Rating
Metacritic	79/100
Review scores
Source	Rating
Allmusic	4/5 stars
Los Angeles Times	3.4 stars on a 4 point scale
Spin Magazine	7/10 stars
BBC	Favourable
Boston Globe	Favourable
Popmatters	8/10 stars
Slant Magazine	4.5/5 stars

Crows is the seventh studio album by singer/songwriter Allison Moorer. It is her first for new label Rykodisc and sees her reunited with producer R.S. Field for the first time since 2004's The Duel. Moorer wrote 12 of the 13 songs on the album while she was between labels and expecting her first child. Featuring a more intimate sound and recorded in four days in September 2009 with no overdubs, the album earned plenty of acclaim with Slant Magazine writing: "Moorer's performance here is arguably a career best. As a fully realized, heady concept that is all but flawless in its execution, Crows joins Hardest and Duel as the third unqualified masterpiece of Moorer's rich career" while AllMusic wrote that "Crows is a mature and artful set of keenly intelligent pop tunes from a singer and songwriter determined to avoid easy categorization."

An acoustic EP, titled Crows Acoustic, was released on May 25, 2010 and included six tracks.

== Track listing ==
No.	Title	Writer(s)	Length
1.	"Abalone Sky"	Allison Moorer	3:37
2.	"Goodbye To The Ground"	Moorer	4:02
3.	"Just Another Fool"	Moorer	2:46
4.	"The Broken Girl"	Moorer	3:36
5.	"Should I Be Concerned"	Moorer	4:44
6.	"When You Wake Up Feeling Bad"	Moorer	2:40
7.	"Easy In The Summertime"	Moorer	4:12
8.	"The Stars & I (Mama's Song)"	Moorer	3:11
9.	"Still This Side Of Gone"	Moorer	4:05
10.	"Like The Rain"	Moorer	3:46
11.	"Sorrow (Don't Come Around)"	Moorer	3:57
12.	"It's Gonna Feel Good (When It Stops Hurting)"	R.S. Field	3:34
13.	"Crows"	Moorer	3:57

== Personnel ==
- Allison Moorer – vocals, backing vocals, acoustic piano, Wurlitzer electric piano, acoustic guitars
- Joe McMahon – celesta, acoustic guitars, electric guitars, steel guitar
- Richard Bennett – guitars (3, 10)
- Brad Jones – bass, vibraphone
- R.S. Field – drums, tambourine (4), acoustic guitar (12)
- Ken Lewis – percussion (2, 3)
- Chris Carmichael – strings, string arrangements

=== Production ===
- R.S. Field – producer
- Richard McLaurin – recording, mixing
- Adam Bednarik – additional engineer
- Greg Calbi – mastering at Sterling Sound (New York City, New York)
- Jesse Bauer and Danny Goldberg for Gold Village Entertainment – management

== Chart performance ==
Chart (2010)	Peak position
US Americana/Folk Albums (Billboard)	11
US Heatseekers Albums (Billboard)	18
