= Billy Block =

- Birth name: William Donald Block
- Also known as: Mr. Nashville
- Born: August 10, 1955; Houston, Texas
- Origin: Houston, Texas
- Died: March 11, 2015 (aged 59)
- Genres: Alternative country, Americana
- Occupation(s): Musician, journalist, broadcaster
- Instrument(s): drums, bass
- Years active: 1972–2015
- Website: Billy Block Documentary (Facebook)

Billy Block (born William Donald Block; August 10, 1955 – March 11, 2015) also known as Mr. Nashville, was a musician, journalist, actor, publisher, television and radio personality. Block was a tireless promoter of independent musicians, primary in the Alternative country - Americana genres. He hosted Billy Block's Western Beat, a live concert-format radio show for over thirty years.

== Background ==
At age 15, Block worked around his school schedule in a music store and playing clubs in the Houston, Texas area with artists: Shake Russell, B.W. Stevenson, Roger Tause and Billy Joe Shaver. Huey Mo hired Block at Sugar Hill Studios where he played drums on two Freddy Fender albums. Block was also the Houston editor of Buddy Magazine.

In 1985, Block moved to Venice, California, he landed a job as the house drummer for the Palomino Club for the Ronnie Mack Barn Dance show in 1987, he held the job until his departure to Nashville in 1995. Block also worked as a bandleader, actor, dancer and singer at The Walt Disney Company. A national commercial for Disney led to additional commercials for Carrows Restaurants, Miller beer and Kentucky Fried Chicken.

In 1991, Block met and married his wife Jill Rochlitz, and Western Beat was created at the Highland Grounds coffee house in Hollywood in the same year. The first Western Beat show included: Wendy Waldman, Rick Vincent, Jim Lauderdale, slide guitarist Jimmy Sloan, Mandy Mercier and Annie Harvey among others.

== Western Beat ==
Increasing the show's reach in 1993, Western Beat hosted a showcase of Los Angeles artists at the Wildhorse Saloon in Nashville. By 1995, Billy and Jill were interested in owning a home and starting a family, they were considering Nashville. Block had been writing for Music Connection magazine for six years, and his band, the Zydeco Party Band, was calling it quits, Block took a writing gig at Music Row Magazine in 1995.

"It was a great place to start in Nashville, because Music Row Magazine is the epicenter of the industry. All the information about everything comes through that office. [...] Working there put me on the fast track into the very heart of Nashville. Six months into my tenure at Music Row, I got a call from Woody Bomar to start doing some sessions with John Scott Sherrill."

—Billy Block, "A Conversation with Billy Block, Western Beat Impresario", by Frank Goodman, September 2001.

In 1999, Billy Block's Western Beat Roots Revival began airing on Saturday nights on WSIX-FM Nashville, the five hour show previously aired on Power Country 102.9 (WZPC) until the station moved to a rock format.

Western Beat With Billy Block premiered on Country Music Television (CMT) on July 2, 2003, featuring guest performers, Trisha Yearwood, Allison Moorer and Lonesome Bob. The show was short lived, other artists included: Gary Allan, Hank Williams III, The Derailers, Michael McDonald, Buddy and Julie Miller, Ralph Stanley, Allison Moorer, BR549 and Kevin Gordon.

== Death ==
Block's death at age 59 in 2015 was a shock to the community. His fight with cancer was documented in Nashville Scene magazine, he was eulogized in USA Today, CMT Music Connection magazine, and Taste Of Country magazine. Block is survived by his wife Jill and sons Rocky and Grady Block, Micheal Hughes and Shandon Mayes.

- Nashville Downtown Partnerships sponsored Billy Block Day concerts in 2016 and 2017.

== Discography ==
Billy Block Discography
Year	Album	Artist	Role
1973	Apothecary	Apothecary	Bass
1977	If You Don't Love Me	Freddy Fender	Drums
1984	Elvis: The First Live Recordings	Elvis Presley	Bass
1990	King Cake Party	Doug Legacy	Drums, Rub
1991	Cutting Their Own Groove	Big Daddy	Guest Artist, Drums
1991	Fables and Other Realities	John Trudell	Drums, Percussion
1992	20 More Explosive Fantastic Rockin' Mega Smash Hit Explosions!		Drums, Percussion
1992	AKA Grafitti Man	John Trudell	Piano, Percussion
1992	Town South of Bakersfield, Vol. 3		Drums, Tambourine
1992	Traveler	California	Drums
1993	Conmemorativo: A Tribute to Gram Parsons		Percussion
1994	Johnny Damas and Me	John Trudell	Drums, Percussion
1994	Kindred Way	Kindred Way	Drums
1994	Land of Hope and Crosby	The Coal Porters	Drums, Timbales
1994	Vol. 1: Rhythm & Folk	Kindred Way	Drums
1995	Big Hits	Tony Orlando	Drums
1995	Los London	The Coal Porters	Drums
1995	Next Time	Katie Trickett	Musician
1996	Invisible Birds	Will Ray	Drums
1996	Man Like Me	Alan Boivin	Drums
1996	Rebels Without Applause	The Coal Porters	Drums, Percussion
1998	Pink & Black	Rick Vito	Drums
1998	Real: The Tom T. Hall Project		Drums
1999	R&B: From Doo Wop to Hip Hop		Editorial Director
2000	Fire, Honey and Angels	The Walt Wilkins Band	Drums, Percussion
2000	The Best of Big Daddy	Big Daddy	Drums
2000	Wisteria	Robin Pearl	Drums
2001	The Fine Print	Mark Islam	Drums
2002	Dressed in Black: A Tribute to Johnny Cash		Vocals, Drums
2002	Rivertown	Walt Wilkins	Drums
2002	Time Spent	Shake Russell Band	Drums
2003	Rockin' Thru the Years	Billy Adams	Producer
2003	You're Not Alone	Essra Mohawk	Drums
2004	Bac	Mike Cullison	Drums, Musician
2004	Teardrops & Diamonds	The Woodys	Additional Personnel, Drums
2004	The Best of Zydeco Party Band	Zydeco Party Band	Vocals, Drums, Rubboard
2004	The Blue Side	Ericson Holt	Drums
2004	Uncomplicated	Ellis Hooks	Drums
2005	Godson of Soul	Ellis Hooks	Main Personnel, Drums
2005	Honeycomb	Frank Black	Main Personnel, Drums
2005	Texas Fed, Texas Bred: Redefining Country Music, Vol. 1		Vocals, Drums
2005	The Hand of God	Ellis Hooks	Main Personnel, Drums
2005	Think of Me	Little Milton	Drums
2005	To: Kate - A Benefit for Kate's Sake		Producer, Drums, Percussion
2006	15 Years Crazy Music		Primary Artist
2006	American Music: The Hightone Records Story [Box Set]		Tambourine
2006	Fast Man Raider Man	Frank Black	Main Personnel, Drums, Vocals (Background)
2006	Lucky Star	Buck Jones	Producer, Drums
2006	Sailover	P.F. Sloan	Drums, Tabla, Tambourine, Percussion
2007	93-03	Frank Black	Musician
2007	Another Saturday Morning	Ellis Hooks	Drums
2007	Another Sleepless Night	David Serby	Drums
2007	Intuition	Betty Harris	Drums
2008	Detachment	Pete Mroz	Drums, Musician
2008	Hello Cruel World	Mars Arizona	Drums
2008	Is Anybody Out There?	Garnet Mimms	Drums
2008	Some Unfinished Business, Vol. 1	Walter Hyatt	Drums, Percussion
2009	Alchemy	Tom Mason	Vocals, Drums
2011	Dedicated: A Salute to the 5 Royales	Steve Cropper	Photography, Tambourine
2011	The Collection 1983-1992	John Trudell	Drums, Percussion
2012	Shortcuts To Infinity/Symptomology	Stephen Kalinich / Jon Tiven / Yo Ma Ma	Drums, Guest Artist
2012	Stick Pony	Bum Steers	Composer
2015	Needle in a Haystack	Ellis Hooks	Drums
2016	Break Time	Garry Tallent	Washboard
2017	Battle Creek Transit Authority: Live in Concert	Brass Band of Battle Creek	Composer
2017	Honkin' & Jivin' at the Palomino!	Big Jay McNeely	Drums
