= William Block =

William Block may refer to:

- Bill Block (William Hunt Block, born 1954), American film producer
- Billy Block (William Donald Block, 1955–2015), American musician, journalist and radio personality

== See also ==
- William H. Block Co., a department store chain in Indiana
