= Not Dark Yet (album) =

Studio album by Shelby Lynne and Allison Moorer
- Released: August 18, 2017
- Recorded: 2016
- Genres: Americana, country, folk
- Length: 37:12
- Labels: Thirty Tigers, Silver Cross Records
- Producer: Teddy Thompson

Allison Moorer chronology
Down to Believing (2015)	Not Dark Yet (2017)	Blood (2019)

Shelby Lynne chronology
I Can't Imagine (2015)	Not Dark Yet (2017)

Not Dark Yet is a duet album between sisters and country/Americana singer-songwriters Shelby Lynne and Allison Moorer. Produced by British folk artist Teddy Thompson, Not Dark Yet was released on August 18, 2017. It is Moorer's ninth studio album, Lynne's fifteenth and marks the first official studio collaboration between the siblings. The title track is taken from the Bob Dylan song of the same name.

Not Dark Yet features covers of songs from a variety of genres and also includes an original song written by Lynne and Moorer.

On August 10, 2017, the album was available to listen to in its entirety on NPR as part of their "first listen" series.

== Critical reception ==
Professional ratings
Aggregate scores
Source	Rating
AnyDecentMusic?	7.3/10
Review scores
Source	Rating
AllMusic	3.5/5 stars
Rolling Stone	3.5/5 stars
Paste Magazine	8.8
PopMatters	8/10 stars
The Observer	4/5 stars
The Irish Times	4/5 stars
Exclaim!	8/10
Spectrum Culture	3.5/5 stars

AllMusic's Thom Jurek says, "Despite singing together since they were old enough to talk, it took a lifetime for sisters Shelby Lynne and Allison Moorer to record together."

Will Hermes reviewed the album for Rolling Stone and gave it 3½ out of a possible 5 stars. He writes, "the title track is the crown jewel, showing the river-deep musicality of a latter-day Dylan croaker when it’s parsed by immaculate, blood-kin harmony."

Paste Magazine's Jon Young rates this album an 8.8 and says, "Not Dark Yet works beautifully. Featuring nine covers and one devastating original, this lovely longplayer spotlights their tangy harmonies, with Lynne’s saltier vocals and Moorer’s sweeter singing intertwining gracefully, evoking ancient traditions of family music-making."

PopMatters' Richard Driver gives the album 8 out of a possible 10 and writes, "The most surprising element to this enjoyable and thoughtful album is that this is their first duet album. That the songs are covers is ultimately irrelevant to the care, arrangements, and deliberate duet Lynne and Moorer deliver, the songs finding their strength and shared focus to push ahead after loss."

== Commercial performance ==
The album debuted at No. 8 on both the Billboard's Americana/Folk Albums and Independent Albums charts, and No. 39 on Top Country Albums, with 3,700 copies sold in the first week. It has sold 6,400 copies as of September 2017.

== Track listing ==
No.	Title	Writer(s)	Original artist/s	Length
1.	"My List"	Brandon Flowers	The Killers	2:53
2.	"Every Time You Leave"	C. Louvin, I. Louvin	The Louvin Brothers	2:24
3.	"Not Dark Yet"	B. Dylan	Bob Dylan	4:20
4.	"I'm Looking For Blue Eyes"	J. Colter	Jessi Colter	2:58
5.	"Lungs"	T. Van Zandt	Townes Van Zandt	2:55
6.	"The Color of a Cloudy Day"	J. Isbell, A. Shires	Jason Isbell and Amanda Shires	4:04
7.	"Silver Wings"	M. Haggard	Merle Haggard	2:35
8.	"Into My Arms"	Nick Cave	Nick Cave and the Bad Seeds	4:48
9.	"Lithium"	Kurt Cobain	Nirvana	5:39
10.	"Is It Too Much"	Allison Moorer, Shelby Lynne		4:47

== Personnel ==
Credits adapted from AllMusic.

Musicians

- Shelby Lynne – vocals, acoustic guitar (4)
- Allison Moorer – vocals, acoustic guitar (1, 4), acoustic piano (3, 10)
- Benmont Tench – acoustic piano (1–4, 7–10), organ (1, 3, 7), keyboards (2), Wurlitzer electric piano (3)
- Erik Deutsch – acoustic piano (5, 6), organ (6)
- Val McCallum – electric guitar (1, 7, 9), acoustic guitar (5, 6)
- Doug Pettibone – electric guitar (1–3, 7, 8, 10), acoustic guitar (2, 9)
- Ben Peeler – electric guitar (4, 9), pedal steel guitar (4, 7)
- Taras Prodaniuk – bass (1–3, 7–10)
- Davey Faragher – bass (5, 6)
- Michael Jerome – drums (1–3, 7–10), percussion (1–3, 7–10)
- Don Heffington – drums (6), percussion (6)
- Mark Howard – space trip sounds (5)
- Teddy Thompson – backing vocals (1), acoustic guitar (2), bass (4), drums (4)

Production

- Teddy Thompson – producer
- Scott Campbell – engineer
- Russ Allen – assistant engineer
- Mark Howard – mixing
- Peter Lyman – mastering at Infrasonic Sound (Los Angeles, California)
- Fetzer Design – art direction
- Sarah Ellison Lewis – photography

== Charts ==
Chart	Peak position
Dutch Albums	44
Scottish Albums	51
US Folk/Americana Albums	8
US Country Albums	39
UK Americana Albums	3
UK Country Albums	2
