= The Hardest Part (Allison Moorer album) =

Studio album by Allison Moorer
- Released: September 26, 2000
- Studio: Woodland Sound Studios and Treasure Isle Recordings (Nashville, Tennessee)
- Genre: Country, Americana
- Length: 45:51
- Label: MCA Nashville
- Producer: Kenny Greenberg; Allison Moorer; Doyle Lee Primm

Allison Moorer chronology
Alabama Song (1998)	The Hardest Part (2000)	Miss Fortune (2002)

Professional ratings
Review scores
Source	Rating
Allmusic	4/5 stars
The A.V. Club	Favourable

The Hardest Part is the second album by singer/songwriter Allison Moorer. The album is a concept album about a doomed relationship produced and co-written by Moorer's then husband Doyle Lee Primm. The album is based on her parents' relationship which ended in the mid-1980s when Moorer's father murdered her mother before killing himself. She told No Depression magazine in 2000: "This record was inspired by the things I saw my mother go through. It’s not the true story, but it’s inspired by the true story."

== Track listing ==
No.	Title	Writer(s)	Length
1.	"The Hardest Part"	Allison Moorer, Doyle Lee Primm	3:13
2.	"Day You Said Goodbye"	Moorer, Primm	4:21
3.	"It's Time I Tried"	Moorer, Primm	4:13
4.	"Best That I Can Do"	Moorer, Primm	3:23
5.	"Think It Over"	Moorer, Primm	3:57
6.	"Bring Me All Your Lovin'"	Moorer, Primm, Kenny Greenberg	5:24
7.	"Is It Worth It"	Moorer, Primm	3:23
8.	"Send Down An Angel"	Moorer, Primm	3:47
9.	"No Next Time"	Moorer, Primm	6:39
10.	"Feeling That Feeling Again/Cold, Cold Earth"	Moorer, Primm	7:31

== Personnel ==
- Allison Moorer – vocals, acoustic guitar (1, 3)
- Jay Bennett – acoustic piano (2, 4, 8, 9), acoustic guitar (2), Hammond B3 organ (3, 6), Mellotron (8)
- Kenny Greenberg – acoustic guitar (1, 3, 7–9), electric guitars (2–6, 8–10), acoustic 12-string guitar (4)
- Rick Plant – electric guitars (3, 9), acoustic guitar (10)
- Buddy Miller – acoustic guitar (4), electric guitars (6)
- Richard Bennett – acoustic guitar (7)
- Rick Plant – banjo (1)
- Marty Stuart – mandolin (1)
- Russ Pahl – pedal steel guitar (2–6, 8–10)
- Michael Rhodes – upright bass (1), bass (2–10)
- Chad Cromwell – drums
- Eric Darken – percussion (2, 5, 6, 9)
- Joe Spivey – fiddle (1, 6)
- Chris Carmichael – fiddle (10)
- Jim Hoke – harmonica (2, 7)
- The Nashville String Machine – strings (3, 8, 9)
- The Love Sponge Strings – string quartet (4)
- Kristin Wilkinson – string arrangements and conductor (3, 4, 8, 9)
- Louise Red – harmony vocals (1–4, 6, 8, 9)
- Harry Stinson – harmony vocals (1), backing vocals (5)
- Louis Nunley – backing vocals (3)
- Dennis Wilson – backing vocals (3)
- Rick Schell – backing vocals (5), harmony vocals (6)
- Lonesome Bob – vocals (9)

=== Production ===
- Tony Brown – executive producer
- Kenny Greenberg – producer
- Allison Moorer – co-producer
- Doyle Primm – co-producer
- Don Smith – engineer (1–6, 8–10)
- Peter Coleman – overdub recording, string recording (3, 4, 8, 9), engineer (7)
- James Bauer – assistant engineer
- Nathan Mann – assistant engineer
- Greg Parker – assistant engineer
- John Saylor – assistant engineer
- Justin Niebank – mixing at Masterfonics (Nashville, Tennessee)
- Ken Love – mastering at MasterMix (Nashville, Tennessee)
- Kate Garner – photography
- Beth Middleworth – design
- T.K. Kimbrell for Two Artist Management – management

== Chart performance ==
Chart (2000)	Peak position
US Top Country Albums (Billboard)	26
US Top Heatseekers Albums (Billboard)	26
