= A Shot of Whiskey and a Prayer =

Studio album by Danni Leigh
- Released: 2001
- Genre: Country
- Label: Monument
- Producer: Emory Gordy, Jr., Richard Bennett

Danni Leigh chronology
29 Nights (2000)	A Shot of Whiskey and a Prayer (2001)	Divide and Conquer (2001)

Professional ratings
Review scores
Source	Rating
Allmusic	3/5 stars

A Shot of Whiskey and a Prayer is the second album by Danni Leigh. Two of its tracks released as singles and rose to relatively low positions on the Billboard country charts: "I Don't Feel That Way Anymore" was at 56, and "Honey I Do" was at 59.

== Track listing ==
1. "Chain Gang" (Dennis Morgan, S. Allen Davis, Bobby Lee Springfield) – 2:38
2. "Longnecks, Cigarettes" (Robin Lee Bruce, Danni Leigh) – 2:39
3. "Trying to Get Over You" (Paul Kennerley) – 2:57
4. "What'cha Gonna Do?" (Kevin Welch) – 4:35
5. "Shiver of Lonesome" (Leslie Satcher, Wynn Varble) – 3:36
6. "Honey I Do" (Stacy Dean Campbell, Al Anderson) – 2:47
7. "Little Things" (Doug Swander, Leigh) – 2:40
8. "Can't Build a Better Love" (Matthew Barnes, Jann Browne, Duane Jarvis) – 3:59
9. "I Don't Feel That Way Anymore" (Charlie Robison) – 3:32
10. "Back in Your Arms Again" (John Hartford) – 3:44
11. "Cruel Heart" (Andy Byrd, Leigh) – 3:00

== Personnel ==
- Richard Bennett - acoustic guitar, electric guitar, percussion
- John Catchings - cello
- Emory Gordy Jr. - bass guitar
- Kenny Greenberg - acoustic guitar, electric guitar
- Tony Harrell - piano
- Mike Henderson - electric guitar
- Tim Hensley - backing vocals
- Steve Hinson - steel guitar, lap steel guitar
- Butch Lee - Hammond organ, percussion
- Danni Leigh - percussion, lead vocals, backing vocals
- Carmella Ramsey - backing vocals
- Leslie Satcher - backing vocals
- Joe Spivey - fiddle
- Harry Stinson - backing vocals
- Kevin Welch - backing vocals
- Casey Wood - percussion
- Craig Wright - drums
