= Getting Somewhere =

Studio album by Allison Moorer
- Released: June 13, 2006
- Studio: Room & Board Recording (Nashville, Tennessee)
- Genre: Country, pop
- Length: 30:58
- Label: Sugar Hill Records
- Producer: Steve Earle

Allison Moorer chronology
The Duel (2004)	Getting Somewhere (2006)	Mockingbird (2008)

Professional ratings
Aggregate scores
Source	Rating
Metacritic	73/100
Review scores
Source	Rating
Allmusic	4/5 stars

Getting Somewhere is the fifth studio album by singer/songwriter Allison Moorer. The album was produced by Moorer's new husband and fellow singer/songwriter Steve Earle and recorded in Nashville. Written on the road while touring with Earle, it saw her embrace a more pop sound and became her first album where the majority of songs were written solely by Moorer. She told PopMatters in 2004: "Some of the records I’ve made have had a lot of cooks, for lack of a better word. This one basically was just me and Steve, and I had written all the songs while he was around. We were on the road together, and so he had a ringside seat for the whole writing of it. So when we went in to make the record in December, it was kind of just a given what we were going to do."

== Track listing ==
All tracks are written by Allison Moorer unless otherwise noted.

No.	Title	Writer(s)	Length
1.	"Work to Do"		2:51
2.	"You'll Never Know"		2:32
3.	"Hallelujah"		3:25
4.	"Fairweather"	Allison Moorer; Steve Earle	3:29
5.	"New Years Day"		2:58
6.	"How She Does It"		2:59
7.	"Where You Are"		2:44
8.	"Take It So Hard"		3:33
9.	"If It's Just for Today"		3:40
10.	"Getting Somewhere"		2:47

== Personnel ==
- Allison Moorer – vocals, backing vocals (1, 2, 7–10), guitars (1, 2, 4–6, 8–10), tambourine (1, 2, 7–10)
- Steve Earle – guitars (1, 7), Moog synthesizer (4), feedback guitar (8), vocals (9)
- Doug Lancio – guitars
- Brad Jones – bass
- Brady Blade – drums
- Chris Carmichael – strings (7), string arrangements (7)
- Jim Hoke – horns (9), horn arrangements (9)

=== Production ===
- Steve Earle – producer
- Ray Kennedy – recording, mixing
- Patrick Earle – recording assistant, mix assistant
- Jim DeMain – mastering at Yes Master (Nashville, Tennessee)
- Cole Gerst – design, illustrations
- Gabrielle Revere – photography
