= Miss Fortune (album) =

Studio album by Allison Moorer
- Released: August 6, 2002
- Studios: OmniSound Studios (Nashville, Tennessee); Georkel Recording (Williamson County, Tennessee)
- Genre: Country Pop
- Length: 57:42
- Label: Universal South
- Producers: R.S. Field; Doyle Lee Primm

Allison Moorer chronology
The Hardest Part (2000)	Miss Fortune (2002)	Show (2003)

Professional ratings
Aggregate scores
Source	Rating
Metacritic	72/100
Review scores
Source	Rating
Allmusic	4/5 stars
No Depression	Favourable

Miss Fortune is the third album by singer/songwriter Allison Moorer. It was her first for new label Universal South, which was co-founded by Tony Brown, who signed her to her first label MCA Nashville. Her first album there saw her working for the first time with Nashville producer R.S. Field and moving towards a more pop sound.

== Track listing ==
No.	Title	Writer(s)	Length
1.	"Tumbling Down"	Allison Moorer, Doyle Lee Primm	4:19
2.	"Cold In California"	Moorer, Primm	4:52
3.	"Let Go"	Moorer	3:49
4.	"Ruby Jewel Was Here"	Moorer, Primm	5:54
5.	"Can't Get There From Here"	Moorer, Bruce Robison	3:07
6.	"Steal The Sun"	Moorer, Primm	4:40
7.	"Up This High"	Moorer, Primm	3:26
8.	"Hey Jezebel"	Moorer, Primm	4:30
9.	"Mark My Word"	Moorer, Primm	2:51
10.	"No Place For A Heart"	Moorer, Primm	4:03
11.	"Yessirree"	Moorer, Primm	5:27
12.	"Going Down"	Moorer, Primm	3:57
13.	"Dying Breed"	Moorer, Primm	6:47

== Personnel ==
- Allison Moorer – lead vocals, backing vocals (2, 3, 5, 7), acoustic guitar (5)
- Michael Webb – acoustic piano (1, 2, 5, 11, 12), Fender Rhodes (1, 10), keyboards (3), Hammond B3 organ (4, 7, 10, 11), Wurlitzer electric piano (7)
- Steve Conn – acoustic piano (4), accordion (4, 13)
- Jay Bennett – electric guitars (1, 4, 6, 8, 12), mandolin (4), Lowrey organ (5, 8), Leslie guitar (5), acoustic guitars (13)
- Michael Noble – acoustic guitars (2, 3, 5, 7–13), banjo (4), dobro (4), electric guitars (6)
- Rob McNelley – acoustic guitars (7, 11), electric guitars (7, 10)
- David Grissom – electric guitars (8)
- R.S. Field – electric guitars (11, 12)
- Russ Pahl – pedal steel guitar (1, 5, 6), slide guitar (2)
- Mike Brignardello – bass (1, 2, 4, 6, 11–13)
- Alison Prestwood – bass (3, 5, 7, 8, 10)
- Rick Schell – drums (1, 2, 11, 12), backing vocals (2, 4, 11), backing vocals (11)
- Kenneth Blevins – drums (4–6, 8, 13)
- Greg Morrow – drums (7, 10), percussion (10)
- Manfred Jerome – percussion (1–4, 7, 8, 12)
- Jim Hoke – horn arrangements (2, 4, 5, 11, 12), saxophones (4), baritone saxophone (12), tenor saxophone (12), clarinet (13)
- Bill Huber – trombone (2, 5), bass trombone (4, 12), tuba (4), euphonium (11)
- Neil Rosengarden – trumpet (2), French horn (2, 5, 11), euphonium (4)
- Chris Carmichael – string arrangements (1, 2, 6, 9), string conductor (1, 6), strings (2, 9), fiddle (4), violin (13)
- The Nashville String Machine – strings (1, 6)
- Yvonne Hodges – backing vocals (1, 8, 12)
- Kim Morrison – backing vocals (1, 8, 12)
- Jared Reynolds – backing vocals (2, 11)

=== Production ===
- Tony Brown – executive producer
- R.S. Field – producer
- Doyle Lee Primm – co-producer
- Jim DeMain – recording engineer
- Joey Turner – assistant engineer
- George Massenberg – mix engineer, mastering
- Eric Conn – mastering
- J.R. Russell – mastering
- Independent Mastering (Nashville, Tennessee) – mastering location
- The Hum Depot (Nashville, Tennessee) – pre-production location
- Eric Ponkin – production assistant
- Mason Vickery – production assistant
- Billy Gosser – guitar technician
- Karen Cronin – art direction, design
- Jim Herrington – photography
- David Leinheardt for Big Hassle Entertainment – management

== Chart performance ==
Chart (2002)	Peak position
US Top Country Albums (Billboard)	35
US Top Heatseekers Albums (Billboard)	34
