= Alabama Song (album) =

Studio album by Allison Moorer
- Released: September 22, 1998
- Studio: Javelina Studios, Love Shack Studios, Masterfonics, Quad Studios, Vital Recordings and The White House (Nashville, Tennessee); MCA Music Media Studios (North Hollywood, California)
- Genre: Country
- Length: 40:41
- Label: MCA Nashville
- Producer: Kenny Greenberg

Allison Moorer chronology
| Alabama Song (1998) | The Hardest Part (2000) |

Professional ratings
Review scores
| Source | Rating |
|---|---|
| Allmusic | 3.5/5 stars |
| About.com | Favourable |

Alabama Song is the debut album by singer-songwriter Allison Moorer. The first single from the album, "A Soft Place to Fall", was featured in the Robert Redford film The Horse Whisperer, and was nominated for an Oscar for Best Original Song at the 1999 Academy Awards.

== Track listing ==
| No. | Title | Writer(s) | Length |
|---|---|---|---|
| 1. | "Pardon Me" | Allison Moorer, Doyle Lee Primm | 3:40 |
| 2. | "Long Black Train" | Moorer, Primm | 4:26 |
| 3. | "Alabama Song" | Moorer, Primm | 3:53 |
| 4. | "Call My Name" | Moorer, Primm | 3:44 |
| 5. | "The One That Got Away (Got Away with My Heart)" | Moorer | 2:20 |
| 6. | "I Found A Letter" | Moorer, Primm | 2:56 |
| 7. | "Easier To Forget" | Moorer, Primm | 3:00 |
| 8. | "Set You Free" | Moorer, Primm | 3:58 |
| 9. | "A Soft Place To Fall" | Moorer, Gwil Owen | 3:51 |
| 10. | "Tell Me Baby" | Walter Hyatt | 4:15 |
| 11. | "Is Heaven Good Enough For You" | Moorer, Primm | 7:15 |

== Personnel ==
- Allison Moorer – vocals
- Tim Lauer – Hammond B3 organ (3), harmonium (11)
- Richard Dodd – programming (4, 7, 10), additional sampling (4, 7, 10)
- Kenny Greenberg – acoustic guitar (1–3, 5, 6, 9, 11), electric guitar (1, 3, 6, 8, 10), baritone guitar (2, 4–6, 9), National guitar (4, 7), gut-string guitar (8), guitar solo (10)
- Rick Plant – electric guitar (1, 3, 4, 8, 9, 11), guitar solo (3, 8, 11), acoustic guitar (10), banjo (11)
- Richard Bennett – electric guitar (2, 5, 10), hi-string acoustic guitar (2), guitar solo (2, 5), acoustic guitar (6–8)
- Joe Spivey – acoustic guitar (2), fiddle (2, 4, 6, 7, 9, 10)
- Dan Dugmore – pedal steel guitar (1–7, 9–11), dobro (8)
- Michael Rhodes – bass (1–4, 6, 11), tic tac bass (1)
- Larry Marrs – bass (5), backing vocals (5)
- Glenn Worf – upright bass (7, 9)
- Dave Pomeroy – bass (8, 10)
- Chad Cromwell – drums (1, 3, 4, 9, 11)
- Harry Stinson – drums (2, 6), backing vocals (6), percussion (7)
- Greg Morrow – drums (5, 8, 10)
- Eric Darken – percussion (2, 4, 5), tambourine (3)
- The Nashville String Machine – strings (10)
- Glen Hardin – string arrangements and conductor (10)
- Louise Red – backing vocals (2–4, 6, 11)
- Ashley Cleveland – backing vocals (3, 11)
- Russ Taff – backing vocals (3)
- John Cowan – backing vocals (4)
- Buddy Miller – backing vocals (5)
- Louis Nunley – backing vocals (6)
- Dennis Wilson – backing vocals (6)
- John Wesley Ryles – backing vocals (9)

== Chart performance ==
| Chart (1998) | Peak position |
|---|---|
| US Top Country Albums (Billboard) | 68 |
