= Down to Believing =

Studio album by Allison Moorer
- Released: March 16, 2015
- Genre: Country; rock; folk
- Length: 47:00
- Label: Entertainment One Music, Proper Records
- Producer: Kenny Greenberg

Allison Moorer chronology
Crows (2010)	Down to Believing (2015)	Not Dark Yet (2017)

Professional ratings
Aggregate scores
Source	Rating
Metacritic	85/100
Review scores
Source	Rating
Allmusic	4.5/5 stars
American Songwriter	4/5 stars
The Observer	4/5 stars
Exclaim!	8/10 stars
Slant Magazine	4/5 stars

Down to Believing is the eighth studio album by American singer-songwriter Allison Moorer. It was released on March 16, 2015, by eOne Nashville and sees her reunited with producer Kenny Greenberg who produced her first two albums. The album was recorded over two years and inspired by events in her personal life during that time including her divorce from Steve Earle and her young son's diagnosis with autism.

== Critical reception ==
Upon release, Down to Believing received positive acclaim from critics. Uncut Magazine wrote that "Out of the pain and anger, Moorer has fashioned the finest album of her career" while AllMusic wrote it was "an emotionally raw yet aesthetically fine album. She may have reached into the depths for these songs, but she's delivered us the gift of a burning light." Thierry Côté of Exclaim! wrote that "even in the rare moments when the production comes dangerously close to generic modern country sheen, Moorer's voice remains a warm, unwavering instrument and the songs are never less than deeply affecting and emotionally resonant."

== Track listing ==
No.	Title	Writer(s)	Length
1.	"Like It Used to Be"	Allison Moorer	3:19
2.	"Thunderstorm/Hurricane"	Moorer	2:48
3.	"I Lost My Crystal Ball"	Moorer, Angelo Petraglia	3:08
4.	"Down to Believing"	Moorer, Audley Freed, Keith Gattis	4:58
5.	"Tear Me Apart"	Moorer, Kenny Greenberg	3:05
6.	"If I Were Stronger"	Moorer, Troy Olsen	4:08
7.	"Wish I"	Moorer, Tony Lane	4:29
8.	"Blood"	Moorer	3:30
9.	"Mama Let the Wolf In"	Moorer, Jeffrey Steele	3:22
10.	"I'm Doing Fine"	Moorer, Zac Maloy	3:08
11.	"Back of My Mind"	Moorer, Skip Black, Neil Medley	4:19
12.	"Have You Ever Seen the Rain?"	John Fogerty	2:43
13.	"Gonna Get It Wrong"	Moorer, Lane	3:50

== Personnel ==
- Chad Cromwell - drums
- John Deaderick - keyboards
- Dan Dugmore - 12-string electric guitar, steel guitar, mandolin
- Fred Eltringham - drums, percussion
- Kenny Greenberg - acoustic guitar, electric guitar
- Jedd Hughes - acoustic guitar
- Jon Conley - banjo, acoustic guitar, mandolin
- Brad Jones - upright bass
- Tim Lauer - keyboards
- Rachel Loy - bass guitar
- Tony Lucido - bass guitar
- Eamon McLaughlin - strings, string arrangements
- Steve Mackey - bass guitar
- Allison Moorer - acoustic guitar, piano, tambourine, lead vocals, background vocals
- Bryan Owings - drums
- Russ Pahl - acoustic guitar, steel guitar
- Ben Phillips - drums
- Lex Price - bouzouki
- Michael Rhodes - bass guitar
- Mike Rojas - keyboards

== Chart performance ==
The album debuted on the Top Country Albums chart at No. 26, and No. 8 on the Heatseeker Albums chart, with 1,600 copies sold for its debut week.

Chart (2015)	Peak position
US Top Country Albums (Billboard)	26
US Americana/Folk Albums (Billboard)	15
US Heatseekers Albums (Billboard)	8
US Independent Albums (Billboard)	36
