= Danni Leigh =

American country singer and businesswoman (born 1970)

- Born: Michelle Sheetz; February 9, 1970 (age 55); Strasburg, Virginia, US
- Occupations: Singer; businesswoman
- Years active: 1998–present
- Spouse: Mike McKenzie
- Children: 1
- Musical career
- Origin: Nashville, Tennessee, US
- Genres: Country
- Instrument: Vocals
- Labels: Decca; Monument; Audium Entertainment

Michelle Sheetz (born February 9, 1970), better known as Danni Leigh, is an American country music singer. At age 19, she relocated to Orlando, Florida, intending to audition as a singer at Disney World, but ended up moving to Nashville, Tennessee, in 1994.

She was signed with Audium Records, after changing labels several times, following Decca's closure, and her by Sony's Monument label. Although she has limited success in the US, she has had more success in Europe due to the different methods consumers learn about new music. Over time, she has also developed a following in Korea, Brazil, and Japan. In 1999, she was nominated for the Rising Star Trophy, a British Country Music Award. In 2001, she released A Shot of Whiskey and a Prayer.

Leigh has also performed a number of small gigs in the Austin, Texas, area, where she moved in 2002.

As her career declined in the US, Leigh later moved again, this time to Spain, many years later and performed elsewhere in Europe and Asia. She even reached the rest of South America. During the tours, she met and eventually married her bandmate Mike McKenzie. The couple returned to Nashville in order to restart her career, but the birth of her only child, a son, in 2010 led her to emphasize both motherhood and becoming a businessperson. Leigh then moved with her husband back to Strasburg, Virginia, her birthplace, where she started her boutique-cum-fitness studio in 2018 and opened another in Winchester.

== Discography ==
=== Albums ===
Title	Album details	Peak positions
Title	Album details	US Country
29 Nights	Release date: October 20, 1998; Label: Decca Records	75
A Shot of Whiskey and a Prayer	Release date: February 13, 2001; Label: Monument Records	—
Divide and Conquer	Release date: November 6, 2001; Label: Audium Entertainment	—
Masquerade of a Fool	Release date: May 14, 2007; Label: AGR	—
Walkin' On A Wire	Release date: June 10, 2022; Label: BFD/Audium Nashville	—
"—" denotes releases that did not chart

=== Singles ===
Year	Single	Peak chart positions		Album
Year	Single	US Country	CAN Country	Album
1998	"If the Jukebox Took Teardrops"	57	58	29 Nights
1999	"29 Nights"	—	—	29 Nights
2000	"Honey I Do"	59	83	A Shot of Whiskey and a Prayer
2000	"I Don't Feel That Way Anymore"	56	—	A Shot of Whiskey and a Prayer
2001	"Sometimes"	—	—	Divide and Conquer
2002	"House of Pain"	—	—	Divide and Conquer
2002	"Last Train to San Antone"	—	—	Divide and Conquer
"—" denotes releases that did not chart

=== Music videos ===
Year	Video	Director
1998	"If the Jukebox Took Teardrops"	Guy Guillet
1999	"29 Nights"	Guy Guillet
2000	"Honey I Do"	Guy Guillet
2002	"Sometimes"	Roger Pistole

=== As guest musician ===
- 2000: Billy Ray Cyrus - Southern Rain (Monument)
- 2001: Dale Watson - Christmas in Texas (Audium)
