= The People Speak =

The People Speak is an online community of young people who want to get involved in global issues. The community engages people of all ages and backgrounds in thoughtful discussions about the value of international cooperation for the United States and the world. From September 1 to November 30 each year, The People Speak (TPS) partners organize thousands of events around the U.S. and the world to explore emerging global challenges and opportunities.

TPS started in 2003 as an initiative of the United Nations Foundation, the Open Society Institute and the Rockefeller Brothers Fund. During the first year, over 3,500 events were organized in all 50 states. Since that time, there have been over 20,000 events in the U.S. and over 50 countries.

The theme for the 2006 TPS season is "Working Together with the World: What's in it for the U.S.?" Participants explore this theme related to three topics:

- Energy and global climate change
- Millennium Development Goals
- Peace, security, and human rights
