= The Duel (album) =

Studio album by Allison Moorer
- Released: April 13, 2004
- Studio: House of David (Nashville, Tennessee)
- Genre: Country, Pop
- Length: 43:58
- Label: Sugar Hill Records
- Producer: R.S. Field; Allison Moorer; Doyle Lee Primm

Allison Moorer chronology
Show (2003)	The Duel (2004)	Getting Somewhere (2006)

Professional ratings
Aggregate scores
Source	Rating
Metacritic	71/100
Review scores
Source	Rating
Allmusic	4/5 stars

The Duel is the fourth studio album by singer/songwriter Allison Moorer. The album was Moorer's first on an independent label and was recorded in 11 days with a small band made up of John Davis (Superdrag), guitarist Adam Landry (Stateside) and producer R.S. Field. The album was her last with her ex-husband, the songwriter and producer Doyle Lee Primm.

== Track listing ==
All tracks are written by Allison Moorer and Doyle Lee Primm.

No.	Title	Length
1.	"I Ain't Giving Up On You"	4:25
2.	"Baby Dreamer"	4:22
3.	"Melancholy Polly"	2:22
4.	"Believe You Me"	4:05
5.	"One On The House"	4:20
6.	"All Aboard"	6:01
7.	"The Duel"	4:09
8.	"When Will You Ever Come Down"	2:38
9.	"Louise Is In The Blue Room"	4:01
10.	"Once Upon A Time She Said"	4:09
11.	"Sing Me To Sleep"	3:08

== Personnel ==
- Allison Moorer – vocals, acoustic guitar (3–6, 8, 10, 11), acoustic piano (5), backing vocals (6)
- Steve Conn – acoustic piano (4, 7), organ (9)
- John Davis – electric guitars (1, 2, 4, 6), bass (1–6, 8–11), backing vocals (1, 2, 6, 8, 9), acoustic piano (2, 5), Rhodes electric piano (2), steel guitar (5), church organ (8), acoustic guitar (8),
- Adam Landry – electric guitars (1–6, 8–10), backing vocals (1, 2, 5, 6, 8, 9), acoustic guitar (5, 6, 8, 9, 11), tenor guitar (9)
- R.S. Field – drums (1–6, 8–11), percussion (2, 3)
- Sonny Red – harmonica (7)

=== Production ===
- R.S. Fields – producer
- Allison Moorer – producer
- Doyle Primm – producer
- Richard McLaurin – recording, mixing
- Adam Bednarik – recording assistant, mix assistant
- Jim DeMain – mastering at Yes Master (Nashville, Tennessee)
- Cole Gerst – art direction, design
- Marina Chavez – photography
- Deep South Entertainment – management

== Chart performance ==
Chart (2004)	Peak position
US Top Country Albums (Billboard)	55
US Independent Albums (Billboard)	41
