= 29 Nights =

Studio album by Danni Leigh
- Released: October 20, 1998
- Genre: Country
- Length: 34:53
- Label: Decca
- Producer: Michael Knox, Mark Wright

Danni Leigh chronology
29 Nights (1998)	A Shot of Whiskey and a Prayer (2001)

29 Nights is the début album by Danni Leigh. It was released in 1998 via Decca Records, and produced by Michael Knox and Mark Wright. The album includes the single "If the Jukebox Took Teardrops," which peaked at 57 on the Hot Country Songs charts.

Charlotte Dillon of Allmusic rated the album four stars out of five, praising the neotraditionalist country sound as well as the appearance of co-writes by Willie Nelson and Merle Haggard.

== Track listing ==
No.	Title	Writer(s)	Length
1.	"If the Jukebox Took Teardrops"	Mike Henderson, Mark Irwin	2:42
2.	"Beatin' My Head Against the Wall"	Kenny Alphin, Danni Leigh	2:24
3.	"29 Nights"	Tommy Conners, Doug Swander, Leigh	3:50
4.	"How Does It Feel to You?"	Mike Noble, Michael Lunn, Leigh	3:55
5.	"Teardrops, Teardrops"	Monte Warden, Leigh	3:07
6.	"Ol' Lonesome"	Steve Bogard, Jeff Stevens, Leigh	2:35
7.	"Mixed Up Mess of a Heart"	Merle Haggard, Tommy Collins	2:21
8.	"Touch Me"	Willie Nelson	3:18
9.	"I Feel a Heartache"	Harlan Howard, Kostas	3:40
10.	"Chain Me"	Warden, Swander, Leigh	3:03
11.	"Weren't You the One?"	Swander, Leigh	3:58

== Personnel ==
As listed in liner notes.

- Richard Bennett – acoustic guitar, electric guitar
- Peter Coleman – background vocals
- Chad Cromwell – drums
- Glen Duncan – fiddle
- Carl Gorodetzky – conductor
- Mike Henderson – harp
- Steve Hinson – steel guitar, Dobro
- Danni Leigh – lead vocals
- Larry Marrs – bass guitar, upright bass, background vocals
- Brent Mason – electric guitar
- The Nashville String Machine – strings
- Steve Nathan – piano, Wurlitzer electric piano, Hammond B-3 organ
- Jim Ed Norman – string arrangements
- Mike Noble – acoustic guitar, harp, mandola
- Dale Oliver – electric guitar
- Tammy Rogers – fiddle
- Neil Thrasher – background vocals
- Bergen White – string arrangements

== Chart performance ==
Chart (1998)	Peak position
U.S. Billboard Top Country Albums	75
