= Kenny Greenberg =

American guitarist, songwriter, producer, and session musician

- Born: Kenneth S. Greenberg; Cleveland, Ohio
- Genres: Rock music, country music
- Occupation: Musician
- Instrument: Guitar
- Years active: 1984–present
- Website: kennygreenberg.com

Kenneth S. Greenberg is an American guitarist, songwriter, producer, and session musician. He is known for bringing a rock-and-roll sensibility to Nashville recording sessions.

== Biography ==
Greenberg was born in Cleveland, Ohio but attended junior high and high school in Louisville, Kentucky. He moved to Nashville at age 21 to play guitar professionally, initially playing on demos and then in recording sessions. Tony Brown was instrumental in helping Greenberg break into production and session work.

Greenberg has worked with Taylor Swift, Amy Grant, Brooks & Dunn, Gretchen Wilson, Willie Nelson, Jewel, Wynonna Judd, Lee Ann Womack, Toby Keith, Trisha Yearwood, Montgomery Gentry, Peter Cetera, Faith Hill, Cyndi Lauper, and other artists. Greenberg has toured with Kenny Chesney, Faith Hill, and Bob Seger.

=== Record production ===
Greenberg produced albums for Pam Tillis (Thunder & Roses), The Mavericks (The Mavericks), Allison Moorer (The Hardest Part, Down to Believing), Joan Baez (Play Me Backwards), Eve Selis (See Me With You), Kayla Adams (Bad Decisions), and others. Greenberg produced and played guitar on Edwin McCain's Misguided Roses.

Greenberg produced the song "A Soft Place to Fall" sung by Allison Moorer for the Robert Redford film The Horse Whisperer, and contributed instrumental music to the movie and soundtrack.

=== Songwriting ===
Greenberg has written songs for Amy Grant ("House of Love"), Ashley Cleveland ("The Power of Love"), and SheDaisy ("Little Good-Byes").

Greenberg wrote and produced instrumental music for VH1's Behind the Music, Beverly Hills, 90210, Baywatch, Fox Sports, NBC Sports, and Entertainment Tonight.

=== Awards ===
Greenberg won the Academy of Country Music award for Guitarist of the Year for 2012.

In 2007, Greenberg won a Grammy Award for Best Rock or Rap Gospel Album for his production on Ashley Cleveland's album Before the Daylight's Shot.

=== Personal life ===
Greenberg lives in Nashville with his wife Ashley Cleveland. He maintains his home studio Ken's Gold Club.

== Discography ==
=== As composer ===
- 1994: Amy Grant - House of Love (A&M) - track 4, "House of Love" (co-written with Greg Barnhill and Wally Wilson)
- 1999: SHeDAISY - The Whole SHeBANG (Lyric Street) - track 1, "Little Good-Byes" (co-written with Kristyn Osborn and Jason Deere)
- 2015: Allison Moorer - Down to Believing (Proper) - track 5, "Tear Me Apart" (co-written with Allison Moorer)

=== As producer ===
- 1992: Joan Baez - Play Me Backwards (Virgin)
- 1995: Ashley Cleveland - Lesson of Love (Reunion)
- 1997: Joan Baez - Gone from Danger (Guardian)
- 1997: Edwin McCain - Misguided Roses (Atlantic)
- 1998: Allison Moorer - Alabama Song (MCA)
- 2000: Allison Moorer - The Hardest Part (MCA)
- 2001: Llama - Close to the Silence (MCA)
- 2001: Pam Tillis - Thunder & Roses (Arista Nashville)
- 2002: Ashley Cleveland - Second Skin (204 Records)
- 2003: The Mavericks - The Mavericks (Sanctuary)
- 2005: Ashley Cleveland - Men and Angels Say (Rambler)
- 2009: Ashley Cleveland - God Don't Never Change (E1)
- 2015: Ashley Gearing - Ashley Gearing EP (Curb)
- 2015: Allison Moorer - Down to Believing (Proper)
- 2016: Eve Selis - See Me With Your Heart (Hippie Chick Twang)
- 2017: Josh Turner - Deep South (Hump Head / MCA)
- 2018: Josh Turner - I Serve a Savior (MCA)

=== Also appears on ===
==== 1984–1989 ====
- 1984: David Olney and the X-Rays - Customized (Boulevard)
- 1985: Black Tie - When the Night Falls (Bench)
- 1986: John Cowan - Soul'd Out! (Sugar Hill) as Johnny "C"
- 1987: Tom Kimmel - 5 To 1 (Mercury)
- 1987: Jo-El Sonnier - Come on Joe (RCA)
- 1987: Wendy Waldman - Letters Home (Cypress)
- 1988: Etta James - Seven Year Itch (Island)
- 1989: The Snakes - Snakes (Curb)

==== 1990–1999 ====
- 1990: Bruce Carroll - The Great Exchange (Word)
- 1991: Ashley Cleveland - Big Town (Atlantic)
- 1991: Feargal Sharkey - Songs from the Mardi Gras (Virgin)
- 1991: Jo-El Sonnier - Tears of Joy (Capitol Nashville)
- 1991: Henry Lee Summer - Way Past Midnight (Epic)
- 1993: Ashley Cleveland - Bus Named Desire (Reunion)
- 1993: Beth Nielsen Chapman - You Hold the Key (Reprise)
- 1993: October Project - October Project (Epic)
- 1993: Ronna Reeves - What Comes Naturally (Mercury)
- 1994: Al Kooper - Rekooperation (Limelight)
- 1994: Charlie Peacock - Everything That's on My Mind (Sparrow)
- 1996: Steven Curtis Chapman - Signs of Life (Sparrow)
- 1997: Steven Curtis Chapman - Greatest Hits (Sparrow)
- 1997: Indigo Girls - Shaming of the Sun (Epic)
- 1998: Trisha Yearwood - Where Your Road Leads (MCA Nashville)
- 1998: Rich Mullins & A Ragamuffin Band - The Jesus Record (Myrrh Records)
- 1999: Bebo Norman - Ten Thousand Days (Watershed)

==== 2000–2004 ====
- 2000: John Cowan - John Cowan (Sugar Hill)
- 2000: Terry Radigan - Radigan (Vanguard)
- 2000: Lee Ann Womack - I Hope You Dance (MCA Nashville)
- 2001: Brooks & Dunn - Steers & Stripes (Arista Nashville)
- 2001: Peter Cetera - Another Perfect World (Victor)
- 2001: Jewel - This Way (Atlantic)
- 2001: Danni Leigh - A Shot of Whiskey and a Prayer (Monument)
- 2002: Amy Grant - Legacy... Hymns and Faith (Word)
- 2002: Coco Montoya - Can't Look Back (Alligator)
- 2002: Shana Morrison - 7 Wishes (Vanguard)
- 2003: Toby Keith - Shock'n Y'all (DreamWorks)
- 2004: Randall Bramblett - Thin Places (New West)
- 2004: Peter Cetera - You Just Gotta Love Christmas (Viastar)
- 2004: Montgomery Gentry - You Do Your Thing (Columbia)
- 2004: Willie Nelson - It Always Will Be (Lost Highway)
- 2004: Charlie Peacock - Full Circle: A Celebration of Songs and Friends (Sparrow)
- 2004: Gretchen Wilson - Here for the Party (Epic)

==== 2005–2006 ====
- 2005: Brooks & Dunn - Hillbilly Deluxe (Arista Nashville)
- 2005: Kenny Chesney - The Road and the Radio (BNA)
- 2005: Faith Hill - Fireflies (Warner Bros.)
- 2005: Jon Randall - Walking Among the Living (Epic)
- 2005: Van Zant - Get Right with the Man (Columbia)
- 2005: Gretchen Wilson - All Jacked Up (Epic)
- 2006: Carolina Rain - Weather the Storm (Equity)
- 2006: Eric Church - Sinners Like Me (Capitol Nashville)
- 2006: Toby Keith - White Trash with Money (Show Dog Nashville)
- 2006: Raul Malo - You're Only Lonely (Sanctuary)
- 2006: LeAnn Rimes - Whatever We Wanna (Curb)
- 2006: Kenny Rogers - Water & Bridges (EMI)
- 2006: Bob Seger - Face the Promise (Capitol)
- 2006: Sugarland - Enjoy the Ride (Mercury)
- 2006: Wishbone Ash - Clan Destiny (Eagle)

==== 2007–2009 ====
- 2007: Brooks & Dunn - Cowboy Town (Arista Nashville)
- 2007: Kenny Chesney - Just Who I Am: Poets & Pirates (BNA)
- 2007: Toby Keith - Big Dog Daddy (Show Dog Nashville)
- 2007: LeAnn Rimes - Family (Curb)
- 2007: Van Zandt - My Kind of Country (Columbia)
- 2007: Trisha Yearwood - Heaven, Heartache and the Power of Love (Big Machine)
- 2008: Chris Cagle - My Life's Been a Country Song (Capitol Nashville)
- 2008: Toby Keith - That Don't Make Me a Bad Guy (Show Dog Nashville)
- 2008: Willie Nelson - Moment of Forever (Lost Highway)
- 2008: Ashton Shepherd - Sounds So Good (MCA Nashville)
- 2009: Luke Bryan - Doin' My Thing (Capitol Nashville)
- 2009: Toby Keith - American Ride (Show Dog Nashville)
- 2009: Reba McEntire - Keep on Loving You (Valory)
- 2009: David Nail - I'm About to Come Alive (MCA Nashville)
- 2009: Taylor Swift - Fearless (Big Machine)
- 2009: Carrie Underwood - Play On (Arista Nashville)
- 2009: Chris Young - The Man I Want to Be (RCA)

==== 2010–2014 ====
- 2010: Joe Cocker - Hard Knocks (Sony Music)
- 2011: Sara Evans - Stronger (Sony / RCA)
- 2010: Toby Keith - Bullets in the Gun (Show Dog-Universal)
- 2011: Toby Keith - Clancy's Tavern (Show Dog-Universal)
- 2011: Mitch Malloy - Mitch Malloy II (Malloy Master Tracks Studios)
- 2011: Chris Young - Neon (RCA)
- 2012: Dierks Bentley - Home (Capitol Nashville)
- 2012: Kenny Chesney - Welcome to the Fishbowl (Columbia Nashville)
- 2012: Terri Clark - Classic (EMI)
- 2012: Toby Keith - Hope on the Rocks (Show Dog-Universal)
- 2012: Grace Potter and the Nocturnals - The Lion the Beast the Beat (Hollywood)
- 2012: Lionel Richie - Tuskegee (Mercury)
- 2013: Gary Allan - Set You Free (MCA Nashville)
- 2013: Sheryl Crow - Feels Like Home (Warner Bros.)
- 2013: Toby Keith - Drinks After Work (Show Dog-Universal)
- 2013: Tracy Lawrence - Headlights, Taillights and Radios (Lawrence Music Group)
- 2013: Bonnie Tyler - Rocks and Honey (Warner Music)
- 2014: Dierks Bentley - Riser (Capitol Nashville)
- 2014: Garth Brooks - Man Against Machine (RCA)
- 2014: Sara Evans - Slow Me Down (RCA)

==== 2015–present ====
- 2015: Luke Bryan - Kill the Lights (Capitol / Decca)
- 2015: Chris Carmack - Pieces of You EP (self-released)
- 2015: Buddy Guy - Born to Play Guitar (RCA / Silvertone)
- 2015: Jess and the Bandits - Here We Go Again (After Midnight Girl Entertainment)
- 2015: Toby Keith - 35 MPH Town (Show Dog / Universal)
- 2015: Reba McEntire - Love Somebody (Nash Icon)
- 2015: Carrie Underwood - Storyteller (Arista Nashville)
- 2016: Garth Brooks - Gunslinger (Sony Music)
- 2016: Kenny Chesney - Cosmic Hallelujah (Columbia)
- 2016: Casey Donahew - All Night Party (Almost Country)
- 2016: Cyndi Lauper - Detour (Sire)
- 2016: Lonestar - Never Enders (Shanachie)
- 2017: Trace Adkins - Something's Going On (BMG / Wheelhouse)
- 2017: Kenny Chesney - Live in No Shoes Nation (Columbia)
- 2017: Toby Keith - The Bus Songs (Show Dog Nashville)
- 2017: Joe Nichols - Never Gets Old (Red Bow)
- 2017: Jerrod Niemann - This Ride (Curb)
- 2017: Blake Shelton - Texoma Shore (Warner Bros.)
