= Allison Moorer =

American singer-songwriter (born 1972)

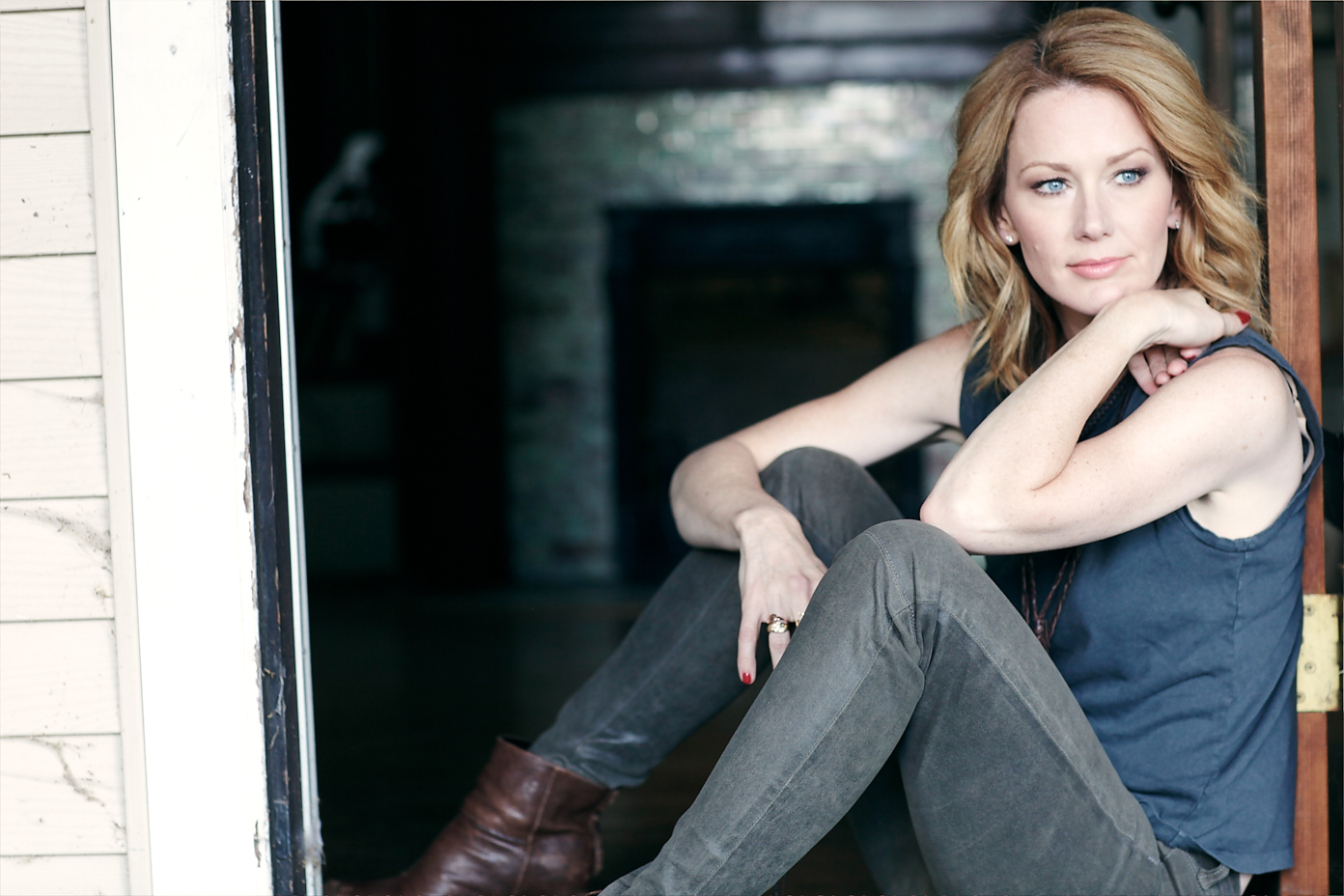
- Moorer in 2018

Background information
- Born: June 21, 1972 (age 53); Mobile, Alabama, U.S.
- Origin: Monroeville, Alabama, U.S.
- Genres: Americana; country; folk
- Occupation: Singer-songwriter
- Instruments: Vocals; guitar; piano
- Years active: 1998–present
- Labels: MCA Nashville Records; Universal South; Sugar Hill; New Line; Rykodisc
- Spouse(s): Steve Earle (m. 2005; div. 2015) Hayes Carll (m. 2019)
- Website: allisonmoorer.com

Allison Moorer (born June 21, 1972) is an American country singer-songwriter. She signed with MCA Nashville in 1997 and made her debut on the U.S. Billboard Country Chart with the release of her debut single, "A Soft Place to Fall", which she co-wrote with Gwil Owen. The song was featured in Robert Redford's The Horse Whisperer and was nominated for an Academy Award for Best Original Song in 1999. Moorer performed at the Oscars ceremony the same year. She has made ten albums and her songs have been recorded by Trisha Yearwood, Kenny Chesney, Miranda Lambert, Steve Earle, and Hayes Carll.

== Early life ==
Moorer was born in Mobile, Alabama on June 21, 1972. She was raised in Frankville, Alabama, and later Monroeville, Alabama, after the deaths of her parents. Growing up, Moorer and her sister also lived in Jackson, Alabama at various times. Music was an important part of the family: her father was a local bandleader and her mother a harmony-singing teacher, and as children, she and her older sister Shelby Lynne sometimes joined their parents on-stage to sing along. In 1986, when Moorer was 14 and her older sister Shelby (now Shelby Lynne) was 17, he shot and killed his wife before taking his own life. Moorer graduated from the University of South Alabama in Mobile in June 1993 and then moved to Nashville, Tennessee, without collecting her diploma, to join her sister, who lived there and had already released three albums. Moorer began singing backgrounds in Lynne's band full-time and toured extensively with her.

== Career ==
In June 1996, Moorer took part in a tribute to her songwriter friend, the late Walter Hyatt, singing his "Tell Me Baby" at Nashville's Ryman Auditorium. Nashville agent Bobby Cudd was in attendance and subsequently introduced her to producer and MCA Nashville president Tony Brown. After a few meetings, Brown asked her to cut some demos for the label. Two tracks—"Pardon Me" and "Call My Name"— from that session were included on her first MCA album, Alabama Song.

When Brown moved from MCA Records to sister label Universal South, Moorer followed. Her 2002 album, Miss Fortune, earned more raves, but did not meet sales expectations. It contained the ballad "Tumbling Down," which was featured on the soundtrack of the popular 2002 film The Rookie.

Her live album Show was recorded in one night at 12th and Porter in Nashville. It features the first recorded collaboration between Moorer and Lynne.

After releasing Show and a DVD on Universal South, Moorer moved to independent label Sugar Hill Records. With a slightly rougher edge than past efforts, The Duel was released in April 2004.

Moorer's first husband, Doyle Lee Primm, was featured as a songwriter on her first four albums. They divorced in 2005.

After serving as his opening act on a European tour, Moorer married fellow singer/songwriter Steve Earle. Earle produced her 2006 album, Getting Somewhere. Moorer wrote all the songs, with the exception of one co-written with Earle. They were both nominated for the Best Country Collaboration with Vocals Grammy, for the song "Days Aren't Long Enough" from Earle's Washington Square Serenade in 2008. The song was also nominated for an Americana Music Association award. Moorer gave birth to the couple's first child, John Henry Earle, on April 5, 2010, but they separated in 2012 and divorced in 2015.

Moorer released the Buddy Miller-produced Mockingbird in February 2008;[4] an album mainly of covers of songs by female singer/songwriters including her sister, Shelby Lynne.

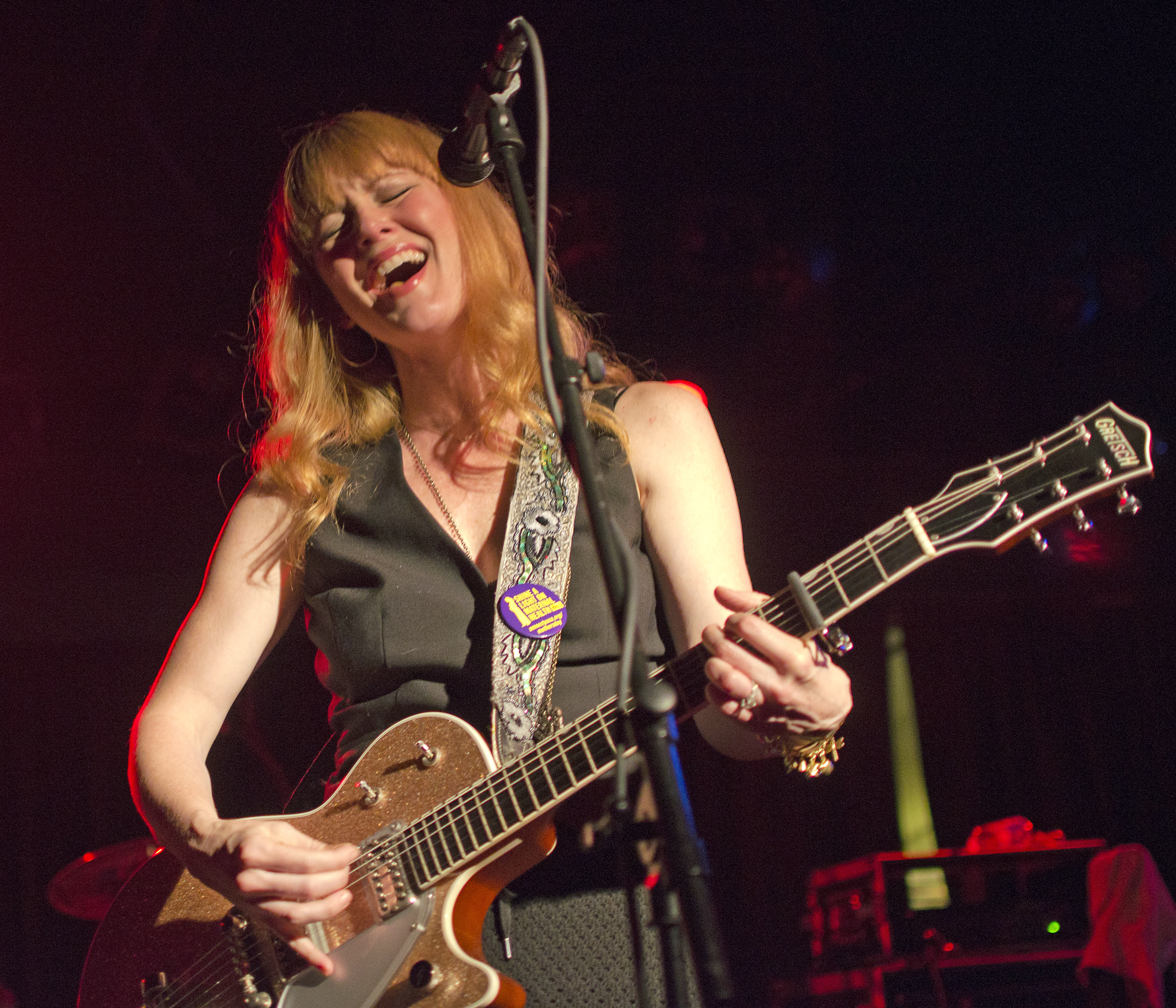
Moorer performing in 2009

In 2009, Moorer performed in The People Speak, a documentary feature film that uses dramatic and musical performances of the letters, diaries, and speeches of everyday Americans, based on historian Howard Zinn's A People's History of the United States.[5] She appeared in the off-Broadway Rebel Voices, a dramatization of Howard Zinn and Anthony Arnove's Voices of a People's History of the United States in late 2007. Also, in 2009, she appeared on the BBC series Transatlantic Sessions, Series 4, Episodes 4 and 5, performing a version of the Irish folk song, "Carrickfergus". She toured with the Jerry Douglas and Ally Bain led Transatlantic Sessions band in early 2011.

In 2015, Moorer released her ninth album, Down to Believing, which marked a return to collaborating with Kenny Greenberg.

In August 2017, Moorer released her tenth album, Not Dark Yet, in collaboration with her sister. Produced by British folk singer Teddy Thompson, it featured covers of songs by Merle Haggard, Bob Dylan, Nirvana and The Killers as well as one original song written by Moorer and Lynne, "Is It Too Much." During an extended interview at the Country Music Hall of Fame, the duo revealed that they were planning a second collaborative album which would instead feature all original material and that they were to begin writing together for the new project in 2018.

Moorer co-produced the 2019 Hayes Carll record What It Is. She and Carll were married on May 12, 2019. Moorer's album Blood was to be released October 25, 2019; her book, Blood: A Memoir, was scheduled for publication on October 29, 2019, on Da Capo Press.

In May 2024, Moorer announced that she had taken a job as a writer-editor at the Country Music Hall of Fame and Museum.

== Personal life ==
In 2005, she married country singer-songwriter Steve Earle with whom she had a son, John Henry Earle, in April 2010. Their son was diagnosed with autism at 23 months old. In March 2014, it was announced that Earle and Moorer had separated. Their divorce was finalized in 2015.

Moorer married musician Hayes Carll on May 12, 2019.

== Discography ==
=== Studio albums ===
Title	Album details	Peak chart positions			
Title	Album details	US Country	US Heat	US Indie	US Folk
Alabama Song	Release date: September 22, 1998; Label: MCA Nashville	68	—	—	—
The Hardest Part	Release date: September 26, 2000; Label: MCA Nashville	26	26	—	—
Miss Fortune	Release date: August 6, 2002; Label: Universal South	35	34	—	—
The Duel	Release date: April 13, 2004; Label: Sugar Hill Records	55	—	41	—
Getting Somewhere	Release date: June 13, 2006; Label: Sugar Hill Records	—	—	—	—
Mockingbird	Release date: February 19, 2008; Label: New Line Records	—	18	44	—
Crows	Release date: February 9, 2010; Label: Rykodisc	—	18	—	11
Down to Believing	Release date: March 16, 2015; Label: E1 Music / Proper Records	26	8	36	15
Not Dark Yet (with Shelby Lynne)	Release date: August 18, 2017; Label: Thirty Tigers	39	—	—	8
Blood	Release date: October 25, 2019; Label: Autotelic / Thirty Tigers	—	—	—	—
"—" denotes releases that did not chart

=== Live albums ===
Title	Album details
Show	Release date: June 24, 2003; Label: Universal South

=== Extended Plays ===
Title	Album details
Crows Acoustic	Release date: May 25, 2010; Label: Rykodisc
Five Holiday Favorites	Release date: December 4, 2021; Label: Autotelic / Thirty Tigers
Wish For You	Release date: February 11, 2022; Label: Autotelic / Thirty Tigers

=== Compilation albums ===
Title	Album details
The Definitive Collection	Release date: June 7, 2005; Label: MCA Nashville
The Ultimate Collection	Release date: February 11, 2008; Label: Humphead Records

=== Singles ===
Year	Single	Peak positions	Album
Year	Single	US Country	Album
1998	"A Soft Place to Fall"	73	Alabama Song
1998	"Set You Free"	72	Alabama Song
1998	"Alabama Song"^{A}	—	Alabama Song
1999	"Pardon Me"	—	Alabama Song
2000	"Send Down an Angel"	66	The Hardest Part
2001	"Think It Over"	57	The Hardest Part
2002	"Cold In California"	—	Miss Fortune
2002	"Up This High"	—	Miss Fortune
2002	"Tumbling Down"	—	Miss Fortune
2003	"Going Down" (with Shelby Lynne)	—	Show
2004	"All Aboard"	—	The Duel
2006	"Fairweather"	—	Getting Somewhere
2007	"I Want a Little Sugar in My Bowl"	—	Mockingbird
2008	"Dancing Barefoot"	—	Mockingbird
2009	"The Broken Girl"	—	Crows
2010	"Just Another Fool"	—	Crows
"—" denotes releases that did not chart

- ^{A} "Alabama Song" reached number 73 on the Canadian RPM Country Tracks chart.

=== Guest singles ===
Year	Single	Artist	Peak chart positions				Album
Year	Single	Artist	US Country	US	US AC	CAN	Album
2002	"Picture"^{A}	Kid Rock	21	4	17	2	—N/a
2008	"Days Aren't Long Enough"	Steve Earle	—	—	—	—	Washington Square Serenade
2019	"Ol' 55"	with Shelby Lynne	—	—	—	—	Come On Up to the House: Women Sing Waits
"—" denotes releases that did not chart

- ^{A} Song was credited on the charts to Kid Rock with Sheryl Crow or Allison Moorer.

=== Music videos ===
Year	Video	Director
1998	"A Soft Place to Fall"	Robert Redford
1998	"Set You Free"	Thom Oliphant
1998	"Alabama Song"	Morgan Lawley
2000	"Send Down an Angel"	Trey Fanjoy
2002	"Tumbling Down"	Adolfo Doring
2004	"Going Down"	Stephen Shepherd
2006	"Fairweather"	Nicholas Poe
2015	"Like It Used to Be"	Coleman Saunders
2015	"Tear Me Apart"	Coleman Saunders

=== Collaborations ===
- Contributed vocals for two songs, "When She Passed By" and "A Perfect Hand", on David Byrne and Fatboy Slim's concept album, Here Lies Love (2009).
- Appears on two albums with The Chieftains: In 2003 on Further Down the Old Plank Road singing "Hick's Farewell" and in 2005 on Live From Dublin: A Tribute To Derek Bell singing "Carrickfergus".
- Performed with Steve Earle on the song "After the Fire is Gone" from Coal Miner's Daughter: A Tribute To Loretta Lynn (2010).
- Performed the female lead vocals in a reworked version Kid Rock's hit "Picture". The song was co-written and originally recorded with Sheryl Crow. Rock's label, Atlantic Records, was unable to obtain permission from Crow's label, A&M Records, to release the original version as a single, thus it was rerecorded with Moorer.
- Has often toured and recorded vocals with Steve Earle since 2006, and was a member of his band the Dukes and Duchesses.
- Duets with Josh Turner on the Hank Williams song "Alone and Forsaken", which appears on his 2020 album Country State of Mind.

== Bibliography ==
- Blood: A Memoir (2019) – published by Hachette Book Group
- I Dream He Talks to Me: A Memoir of Learning How to Listen (2021) – published by Hachette Book Group

== Awards and nominations ==
Year	Association	Category	Nominated work	Result
1998	Academy of Country Music Awards	Top New Female Vocalist	Herself	Nominated
1999	Academy Awards	Best Original Song	"A Soft Place To Fall"	Nominated
2004	Americana Music Honors & Awards	Artist of the Year	Herself	Nominated
2008	Grammy Awards	Best Country Collaboration with Vocals	"Days Aren't Long Enough" with Steve Earle	Nominated
