= Lonesome Bob =

American singer

Lonesome Bob (a.k.a. Bob Chaney) is a country rock singer-songwriter. He was the drummer for the Ben Vaughn Combo before heading to Nashville for the country scene.

His 1997 debut recording was Things Fall Apart. His second album, Things Change, contained the song "Where Are You Tonight". Allison Moorer provides backing vocals on both of these recordings and on many of these songs.
