= Chris Carmichael (musician) =

American musician, composer and arranger

- Born: July 6, 1962 (age 64); San Antonio, Texas, U.S.
- Occupations: Musician, arranger, composer, conductor
- Instruments: Violin

Chris Carmichael (born July 6, 1962) is an American musician, arranger and composer.

== Biography ==
Carmichael was born in San Antonio, Texas. The son of an Air Force fighter pilot, he moved extensively before taking up the violin while living in Hampton, Virginia. After moving to Bowling Green, Kentucky in 1975, he entered into more formal training - studying violin with Western Kentucky University professor Betty Pease (a former student of Ivan Galamian) for eight years. While in the university environment, he also studied music theory, composition, orchestral and chamber performance under teachers; Dr. David Livingston (a former student of composer Roy Harris), Vsevolod Lezhnev, (principal cellist with the Moscow Philharmonic and Pittsburgh Symphony orchestras) and Leon Gregorian (head of Michigan State University's conducting program).

After his formal training, he began a career as a touring musician for various artists in several genres including outlandish entertainers Joe Savage and Jason D. Williams (RCA).

After moving to Nashville, Tennessee in the late 1980s, his group Fifteen Strings—a hard rock band—landed a record deal with Atlantic Records in New York City. A few years later, he signed as a staff writer for Warner/Chappell in New York, but remained a Nashville resident.

In the early 1990s, Carmichael transitioned into full-time studio work and arranging. His orchestral arrangements have been performed by major groups such as the Boston Pops Orchestra.

Carmichael's television and radio appearances include the 71st Academy Awards, The Tonight Show, The Academy of Country Music Awards, The Country Music Association Awards, CBS Morning Show, The View, A Prairie Home Companion, Noddy, and many others.

Arrangements of distinction include the string quartet arrangement of Tim McGraw's "If You're Reading This" which originally aired at the 2007 Academy of Country Music awards show, and later became a single release.

His contributions to film soundtracks include Down in the Valley, The Sapphires, and Shrek 2.
