= Shelby Lynne discography =

- Studio albums: 16
- Compilation albums: 3
- Singles: 29
- Music videos: 18

Shelby Lynne is an American country pop singer-songwriter. Her discography consists of 16 studio albums and 29 singles released between 1988 and 2020.

== Studio albums ==
=== 1980s and 1990s ===
Title	Album details	Peak chart positions			
Title	Album details	US Country	US	US Heat	UK
Sunrise	Release date: September 12, 1989; Label: Epic Records	61	—	—	—
Tough All Over	Release date: June 27, 1990; Label: Epic Records	31	—	—	—
Soft Talk	Release date: August 27, 1991; Label: Epic Records	55	—	—	—
Temptation	Release date: July 6, 1993; Label: Mercury/Morgan Creek	55	—	21	—
Restless	Release date: July 18, 1995; Label: Magnatone Records	72	—	—	—
I Am Shelby Lynne	Release date: April 1999; Label: Mercury/Island Records	—	165	18	94
"—" denotes releases that did not chart

=== 2000s and 2010s ===
Title	Album details	Peak chart positions						
Title	Album details	US	US Heat	US Indie	US Folk	US Rock	SWE	UK
Love, Shelby	Release date: November 13, 2001; Label: Island Records	109	1	—	—	—	—	128
Identity Crisis	Release date: September 16, 2003; Label: Capitol Records	160	5	—	—	—	—	—
Suit Yourself	Release date: May 24, 2005; Label: Capitol Records	—	11	—	—	—	—	—
Just a Little Lovin'	Release date: January 29, 2008; Label: Lost Highway Records	41	—	—	—	—	58	129
Tears, Lies and Alibis	Release date: April 20, 2010; Label: Everso Records	108	—	16	3	36	—	—
Revelation Road	Release date: October 18, 2011; Label: Everso Records	169	—	28	6	42	—	—
I Can't Imagine	Release date: May 5, 2015; Label: Rounder Records	—	—	—	5	—	—	—
Not Dark Yet (with Allison Moorer)	Release date: August 18, 2017; Label: Thirty Tigers, Silver Cross	—	—	8	8	—	—	—
"—" denotes releases that did not chart

=== 2020s ===
Title	Album details
Shelby Lynne	Release date: April 17, 2020; Label: Everso Records, Thirty Tigers
The Healing: A-Tone Recordings	Release date: December 2, 2020; Label: Extreme Music
The Servant	Release date: September 13, 2021; Label: Extreme Music
Consequences of the Crown	Release date: August 16, 2024; Label: Monument Records

== Holiday albums ==
Title	Album details	Peak chart positions	
Title	Album details	US Folk	US Holiday
Merry Christmas	Release date: October 12, 2010; Label: Everso Records	9	31

== EPs ==
- Thanks, SL (2013)

== Compilation albums ==
Title	Album details
This Is Shelby Lynne: The Best of the Epic Years	Release date: August 8, 2000; Label: Epic Records
Epic Recordings	Release date: September 19, 2000; Label: Epic Records
The Definitive Collection	Release date: August 29, 2006; Label: Hip-O Records

== Singles ==
=== 1980s and 1990s ===
Year	Single	Peak chart positions		Album
Year	Single	US Country	CAN Country	Album
1989	"Under Your Spell Again"	93	—	—N/a
1989	"The Hurtin' Side"	38	—	Sunrise
1989	"Little Bits and Pieces"	62	85	Sunrise
1990	"I'll Lie Myself to Sleep"	26	37	Tough All Over
1990	"Things Are Tough All Over"	23	19	Tough All Over
1991	"What About the Love We Made"	45	86	Tough All Over
1991	"The Very First Lasting Love" (with Les Taylor)	50	41	Soft Talk
1991	"Don't Cross Your Heart"	54	95	Soft Talk
1993	"Feelin' Kind of Lonely Tonight"	69	—	Temptation
1993	"Tell Me I'm Crazy"	—	—	Temptation
1995	"Slow Me Down"	59	—	Restless
1995	"I'm Not the One"	—	—	Restless
1996	"Another Chance at Love"	—	—	Restless
1999	"Your Lies"	—	—	I Am Shelby Lynne
"—" denotes releases that did not chart

=== 2000s and 2010s ===
Year	Single	Peak chart positions					Album
Year	Single	US AAA	US AC	US Adult Pop	CAN AC	UK	Album
2000	"Leavin'"	—	—	—	71	73	I Am Shelby Lynne
2000	"Gotta Get Back"	19	26	—	—	—	I Am Shelby Lynne
2001	"Killin' Kind"	—	—	30	—	—	Love, Shelby
2002	"Wall in Your Heart"	—	22	—	—	—	Love, Shelby
2003	"Telephone"	—	—	—	—	—	Identity Crisis
2003	"Lonesome"	—	—	—	—	—	Identity Crisis
2005	"I Won't Die Alone"	—	—	—	—	—	Suit Yourself
2005	"Go with It"	—	—	—	—	—	Suit Yourself
2007	"Anyone Who Had a Heart"	—	—	—	—	—	Just a Little Lovin'
2011	"Revelation Road"	—	—	—	—	—	Revelation Road
2012	"Heaven's Only Days Down the Road"	—	—	—	—	—	Revelation Road
"—" denotes releases that did not chart

=== As a featured artist ===
Year	Single	Artist	Peak chart positions			Album
Year	Single	Artist	US Adult Pop	US Country	NLD	Album
1988	"If I Could Bottle This Up"	George Jones	—	43	—	Friends in High Places
1990	"Tomorrow's World"	Various	—	74	—	—N/a
2003	"Going Down"	Allison Moorer	—	—	—	Show
2004	"Run Away"	Live	20	—	41	Awake: The Best of Live
"—" denotes releases that did not chart

== Music videos ==
Year	Video	Director
1989	"The Hurtin' Side"	
1990	"I'll Lie Myself to Sleep"	Deaton-Flanigen Productions
1990	"Things Are Tough All Over"	Deaton-Flanigen Productions
1991	"The Very First Lasting Love" (with Les Taylor)	Deaton-Flanigen Productions
1993	"Feeling Kind of Lonely Tonight"	Michael Berkofsky
1993	"Tell Me I'm Crazy"	Michael Berkofsky
1995	"Slow Me Down"	Steven Goldmann
1995	"I'm Not the One"	Roger Pistole
1996	"Another Chance at Love"	Roger Pistole
1999	"Your Lies"	
2000	"Your Lies" (version 2)	
2001	"Gotta Get Back"	Randee St. Nicholas
2002	"Killin' Kind"	Hype Williams
2002	"Wall in Your Heart"	Randee St. Nicholas
2004	"Run Away" (with Live)	Mary Lambert
2005	"Go with It"	Eric Cochran/Alexandra Hedison
2008	"Anyone Who Had a Heart"	Stephen Scott/Brendan Steacy
2012	"Heaven's Only Days Down the Road"	darkenergymedia
2015	"Paper Van Gogh"	Alexandra Hedison
