= Epic Recordings =

Compilation album by Shelby Lynne
- Released: September 19, 2000
- Genre: Country
- Length: 54:23
- Label: Epic
- Producer: James Stroud; Billy Sherrill; Bob Montgomery

Shelby Lynne chronology
I Am Shelby Lynne (1999)	Epic Recordings (2000)	Love, Shelby (2001)

Epic Recordings is a compilation album drawing from Lynne's three Epic albums, Sunrise, Tough All Over, and Soft Talk. The album was released on September 19, 2000.

== Critical reception ==
Professional ratings
Review scores
Source	Rating
AllMusic	3/5 stars
Robert Christgau	(2-star Honorable Mention)

William Ruhlmann of AllMusic noted that the "album is not billed as a 'best-of'", and concluded that it was instead "the rest of Shelby Lynne."

The Los Angeles Times advised that listeners avoid the album "until [they] know exactly what's involved", and explained that the majority of its content is from the era in which Lynne "wasn’t allowed to pursue her musical instincts [when recording]. Instead she was encouraged to make records in a radio-friendly country style."

Country Standard Time stated that the album's "eclecticism" demonstrates why Lynne "has always been a marketing person's nightmare", while emphasizing that "as a singer, she's rarely a let down to anybody".

== Track listing ==
No.	Title	Writer(s)	Length
1.	"Don't Get Around Much Anymore"	Duke Ellington; Bob Russell	2:52
2.	"Till You Were Gone"	Rory Michael Bourke; Mike Reid	3:30
3.	"Lonely Weekends"	Charlie Rich	2:25
4.	"I'm Confessin' (That I Love You)"	Doc Daugherty; Al J. Neiburg; Ellis Reynolds	3:42
5.	"Don't Mind if I Do"	Skip Ewing	2:42
6.	"Your Love Stays with Me"	Rory Michael Bourke; Mike Reid	2:58
7.	"Lighter Shade of Blue"	Max D. Barnes; Skip Ewing; Troy Seals	3:49
8.	"Dog Day Afternoon"	Wayne Carson	3:41
9.	"Soft Talk"	Troy Seals; Eddie Setser	3:39
10.	"I Walk the Line"	Johnny Cash	2:38
11.	"I'll Lie Myself to Sleep"	Tony Haselden; Tim Mensy	4:05
12.	"Thinking About You Again"	Mike Porter; Stephony Smith	3:08
13.	"You Can't Break a Broken Heart"	Chuck Jones; Chris Waters	3:17
14.	"I've Learned to Live"	Dean Dillon; Frank Dycus	3:53
15.	"Stop Me"	Jim Lauderdale; John Leventhal	3:43
16.	"It Might Be Me"	Chuck Jones; J.D. Martin	4:21
Total length:			54:23

Track information and credits adapted from the album's liner notes.
