= Urgh! (band) =

Serbian grindcore/alternative rock band

URGH!
- Origin: Belgrade, Serbia
- Genres: Hardcore punk, grindcore, alternative rock, noise music, electronic music, experimental music
- Years active: 1991 – 2001; 2009 – present
- Labels: Take It Or Leave It Records, Silver Cross Records, B92, Be Bop Records
- Members: Dragoslav Ružić; Jovan Ružić; Maja Cvetković; Siniša Stojanović
- Past members: Dejan Stanisavljević; Igor Štanglicki; Iris Miljković; Nikola Marković; Strahinja Lukić; Uroš Smiljanić; Đorđe Smiljanić
- Website: Official website

Urgh! is a Serbian grindcore/alternative rock band from Belgrade.

== History ==
=== 1990s ===
The band was formed in January 1991 in Belgrade as grindcore quartet. With heavy rotation on bass default members were Dragoslav Ružić "Guru Ghagi" (vocals), Ðorđe Smiljanić "Djolle"(guitar) and Dejan Stanisavljević "Stanna" (drums). The band got the name from a typical onomatopoeic word URGH! frequently used in comicbooks. Their debut recordings, the tracks "Acid Rain" and "Paradise Town", appeared on the various artists compilation album Tito nikada više (Tito Nevermore), released by Intermusic in 1992.

During the same year, they appeared on the split album Yonuss Tape, also featuring the Belgrade girl band PMS, with the prominent tracks "Acid Rain", "Paradise Town", "Let's See What You Give", "Zašto vrištiš?" ("Why Are You Screaming") and "Deceiver", the latter being a cover version of a Napalm Death track, released on compact cassette by Take It Or Leave It Records. The band also recorded a successful promotional video for the song "Paradise Town", which, broadcast on the national television, presented the band to a wider audience.

The following year, the band participated the Armatura performance, featuring Belgrade artists from various spheres, where, on several occasions, the band performed only cover versions and due to the positive reactions to the performance of the Lenny Kravitz song "Are You Gonna Go My Way", the band introduced it into their repertoire. At the time, the line-up stabilized with Igor Štanglicki "Krrle" on bass. The band started combining different genres, including rock, rap, noise and techno music, eventually being recorded on their first studio album 9194 in 1995. The album, available on compact cassette only, got the name 9194 since it featured the material recorded from 1991 until 1994. Being split on two sides, the A-side called Evergreen, and the B-side called Evergrind, the album, released by Silver Cross Records, featured a guest appearance by the Dead Ideas vocalist Jelena Komnenić on the track "Kraj" ("The End").

In November 1995, the band held acoustic performances at the Belgrade clubs Barutana and KST, featuring the previously released songs in unplugged arrangements performed on acoustic guitars, a violin, an accordion and toys. The recordings from the performances were released on the live album Unplugged. The album was released by Silver Cross Records on compact cassette in a limited edition of 1000 copies and beside their own songs also featured a cover version of The Misfits song "Mommy". The band also participated the Brzi Bendovi Srbije manifestation, getting the band of the year award. During the same year, the songs "Deep Breathing" and "Thirst" appeared on the various artists compilation Witness Of the 1st Discussion, released by Silver Cross Records.

The second studio album Oesophagus was released by B92 in June 1997, in a similar musical direction as on the previous release. The album, available on compact cassette only, recorded at the Belgrade studio Focus, on November and December 1996, featured guest appearance by Viborg Dallas vocalist Ema Vuai and Vrooom vocalist and actress Vladislava Đorđević. Music videos recorded for the tracks "Kratko & jasno" ("Loud & Clear"), "Apo pantos kakodaimonos" and "Razmena materije" ("Matter Exchange"), beside promoting the album, also served as an evidence of the band activity since they seldom performed live at the time. After the album release, the band held a mini-tour of Slovenia with Jovan Ružić "Yolefist" on guitar.

The following year, Guru Ghagi appeared on the Vlada Divljan tracks "Niko nije srećniji od nas" ("Nobody Is Happier Than Us"), also featuring Šaban Bajramović, and "Pomoć, pomoć" ("Help, Help"), a cover version of the Idoli debut single, released on the 3 palme za dve bitange i ribicu (Palm Trees for Two Punks and a Chick) movie soundtrack. The soundtrack album also featured the URGH! track "Duboko disanje". The band also appeared on the various artists compilation with live versions of the songs "Nikad se necu vratiti" ("I Will Never Come Back") and "Erupcija" ("Eruption"), recorded at the fifth anniversary celebration of the TV Politika show Paket Aranžman (Package Deal) held at the Belgrade KST on December 7, 1996, and released on the Svi protiv svih (Everybody Against Everyone) various artists compilation in 1998.

In 1999, the band entered the studio and recorded several new songs: "Struja" ("Electricity"), Samousavršavanje ("Self-improvement"), "Grč" ("Spasm") and "Konačno gluv" ("Deaf At Last"), which would appear on the first compact disc release, the compilation album 120%, featuring a selection of the material released on Unplugged and Oesophagus. The CD was never released although some tapes surfaced in the market and had modest distribution. In the autumn of the same year E-Play member Maja Cvetković took over bass duties and shortly after the drummer Dejan Stanisavljević left the band, being replaced by sampled drum tracks. Thus, the band remained a trio with Yolefist in charge of samples and had another tour of Slovenia.

=== 2000s ===
In May and June 2000 the band recorded their third studio album Sumo, featuring the songs "Kašika, viljuška, nož" ("Spoon, Fork, Knife"), promoted with an animated music video, and "Stigmata" featuring guest appearance by the hip hop group Beogradski Sindikat. The album, band's first one to be released on compact disc, was produced by Dragan Milošević "Krle" and released by Be Bop Records in 2001. After the album release, the band ceased to exist. During the same year, their song "Čekić" ("The Hammer") appeared on the Apsolutnih sto (Absolute Hundred) movie soundtrack, released by Komuna.

In 2009, Guru Ghagi with Yolefist and E-Play bassist Maja Cvetković reformed the band and started working on a new studio release. During December of the same year, the band had finished the recording sessions for the new studio album entitled Pozorište surovosti (Theatre of Cruelty), featuring the new drummer Siniša Stojanović "Sinister".

=== 2010s ===
In May 2011, the band released the studio album Pozorište surovosti (Theatre of Cruelty) has been available for free digital download from band's website. The album was previously announced with the single "Horoskop laže" ("The Horoscope is Lying"), also available for free download, with a new version of the track from Sumo "Noć punog meseca" ("Night of the Full Moon") as the single's B-side".

In 2015, the band recorded a video for the song "Samousavršavanje", originally recorded in 1999.

== Discography ==
=== Studio albums ===
- 9194 (1994)
- Oesophagus (1997)
- Sumo (2001)
- Pozorište surovosti (2011)
- Posle pandemije, pre Trećeg svetskog rata (2025)

=== Compilation albums ===
- Yonuss Tape (split album with PMS, 1992)
- 120% (1999)

=== Live albums ===
- Unplugged (1995)

=== Singles ===
- "Horoskop laže" (2011)
- Pumpaj (2025)

== Bibliography ==
- EX YU ROCK enciklopedija 1960-2006, Janjatović Petar; ISBN 978-86-905317-1-4
