= Gotta Get Back =

2000 single by Shelby Lynne

Single by Shelby Lynne

from the album I Am Shelby Lynne
- Released: 2000
- Genre: Country blues; country pop
- Length: 3:37
- Label: Island Def Jam
- Songwriter(s): Bill Bottrell; Shelby Moorer; Dorothy Overstreet
- Producer(s): Bill Bottrell

Shelby Lynne singles chronology
"Leavin'" (2000)	"Gotta Get Back" (2000)	"Killin' Kind" (2001)

Music video
- "Gotta Get Back" on YouTube

"Gotta Get Back" is a song co-written and performed by American country singer Shelby Lynne, issued as the third and final single from her sixth studio album I Am Shelby Lynne. The song peaked at No. 26 on the Billboard Adult Contemporary chart in 2000.

== Charts ==
Chart performance for "Gotta Get Back"
Chart (2000)	Peak position
US Adult Contemporary (Billboard)	26
