= Just a Little Lovin' =

Studio album by Shelby Lynne
- Released: January 29, 2008
- Recorded: January 2007
- Studio: Capitol Studio A (Hollywood)
- Genres: Pop; country
- Length: 38:43
- Label: Lost Highway Records
- Producer: Phil Ramone

Shelby Lynne chronology
| Suit Yourself (2005) | Just a Little Lovin' (2008) | Tears, Lies and Alibis (2010) |

Singles from Just a Little Lovin'
- 1. "Anyone Who Had a Heart" Released: December 18, 2007

Just a Little Lovin' is the tenth studio album by Shelby Lynne, released in the United States and Canada on January 29, 2008. The album is a tribute to British singer Dusty Springfield, and features covers of nine songs popularized by her, in addition to "Pretend", an original song written by Lynne. In contrast to the more fully instrumented original versions Dusty Springfield recorded, Lynne's remakes featured sparse arrangements, favoring acoustic guitars and pianos rather than a string or horn section.

== Inspiration ==
Shelby Lynne's 1999 breakout album I Am Shelby Lynne had drawn widespread favorable critical comparison to the 1968 classic Dusty Springfield album release Dusty in Memphis, and in promoting I Am... Lynne, when asked about the Dusty Springfield comparisons, she replied: "That's the ultimate [compliment]...I've had the Dusty in Memphis record for many years." (Lynne would elsewhere indicate her familiarity with Dusty in Memphis dates from 1998 when she received a copy of the album as a gift.) In 2010 Lynne would take a different perspective: "Through the years, people have made silly [Lynne/ Springfield] comparisons [although] there’s absolutely nothing about us that’s alike" while allowing of Springfield: "[Her] songs are so amazing and she was such a great singer."

Shelby Lynne on how Capitol Records
came to approve Just a Little Lovin'
"Over drinks in a dark bar in Hollywood I put my cards on the table. The record company man told me that they didn't know what to do with the last record I made. We sat there & tossed around bullshit for an hour or so. Round two began & we had some more drinks. We were just getting fuzzy & not a lot was accomplished. Towards the end of a frustrating evening I remember saying: 'Hell, I'm just going to call Barry Manilow & cut the Dusty Springfield songs! Maybe somebody will like that! Everybody loves Dusty!' Record company man almost dropped his drink, got all saucer eyed & said: 'Well, I can see getting behind that.' I laughed out loud. Record men respond when you talk about Dusty Springfield."

In the spring of 2005 Lynne received an email from Barry Manilow suggesting that she cut an album of Dusty Springfield songs. About to go on tour behind her newly released Suit Yourself album, Lynne was at the time unable to deal with any future project but remembered Manilow's suggestion, in May 2006 getting her manager Elizabeth Jordan's endorsement of Lynne recording a Dusty Springfield tribute album. After receiving approval from Capitol Records in July 2006, on Jordan's recommendation, Lynne phoned veteran producer Phil Ramone (who early in his career had engineered the Dusty Springfield recording of "The Look of Love"). Ramone was agreeable to the project, over which he and Lynne brainstormed for the remaining half of the year, commencing the recording of what would be the Just a Little Lovin' album on January 7 in Capitol Records Studio A. The album's tracks were all recorded complete as sung and played with no overdubs.

== Tracks ==
Shelby Lynne on
the album's "groove"
"The most important thing when you're doing a [remake] is to keep the song as it is. You can't be changing the melody. But the groove is another thing.... We just went in [the studio] on a Monday morning and" - cutting "Just a Little Lovin'", the first track recorded - "kind of found a groove" for the entire album: "We just kind of 'molassessed' down" the Springfield originals.

The cover of Just a Little Lovin'' showed Lynne posing in a similar way to Springfield on the cover of Dusty in Memphis (Lynne acknowledged the resemblance, saying that it was serendipitous), and the album featured four remakes from the Springfield album while passing over its highest-profile cut: the 1969 Top Ten hit "Son of a Preacher Man" (Shelby Lynne quote:) "I would never ever ever attempt to cut 'Son of a Preacher Man.' [Dusty Springfield] owns that." The title cut of Lynne's album: "Just a Little Lovin'", had been introduced on Dusty in Memphis, from which album Lynne also remade "Breakfast in Bed" and "I Don't Want to Hear It Anymore", the latter a Randy Newman composition which Lynne described as "the song that I [heard and] fell in love with Dusty": Lynne also remade the shelved Dusty in Memphis track "Willie and Laura Mae Jones", a 1969 Dusty Springfield single release written by Lynne's friend Tony Joe White, known to Lynne via Waylon Jennings 1972 version.

Although Lynne commented that the omission of a remake of Springfield's 1964 Top Ten hit "Wishin' and Hopin'" was due to (Shelby Lynne quote:) "[it] not [being] my favorite song" a "Wishin' and Hopin'" remake was included on the UK release of Just a Little Lovin'. Lynne did record two other compositions by "Wishin' and Hopin'" writers Burt Bacharach and Hal David, one of them the 1967 Dusty Springfield hit "The Look of Love" and the other "Anyone Who Had a Heart" which had itself been a "cover" for Springfield, being one of a number of U.S. hits recorded for her 1964 debut album A Girl Called Dusty. (A U.S. hit for Dionne Warwick, "Anyone Who Had a Heart" would be a #1 hit in Springfield's native UK in February 1964 for Cilla Black.) Critic Dave Madeloni opined: "Lynne takes 'The Look of Love' and 'Anyone Who Had a Heart' and boils them down to a hush, with understated arrangements that [showcase] her gorgeous voice".

Two songs remade by Lynne she was familiar with but not as Dusty Springfield hits, one of them being "You Don't Have to Say You Love Me", Springfield's career record from 1965 which Lynne actually knew via the 1970 Elvis Presley recording: (VVN Music:)"The fullness and beauty of Lynne's voice is shown wonderfully [on 'You Don't Have to Say...', whose] a capella intro [leads] into an emotional torch song." The second: "How Can I Be Sure", a 1970 Top 40 UK hit for Springfield, Lynne knew from the original 1967 Young Rascals' version: Lynne's version, eschewing the song's trademark 3/4 waltz time in favor of a 2/4 time signature arrangement featuring only a lone guitar, "stripped [the song] of its Parisian street-song flavor [to end the album on] a [note of] naked need." Just a Little Lovin' also featured Springfield's inaugural solo hit from 1963: the "bouncy pop confection" "I Only Want to Be With You", from which Lynne "strains the sugar and bounce, leaving [it as] a bittersweet bossa nova", and included one song not recorded by Springfield: "Pretend", which Lynne had written prior to her Dusty Springfield project but which struck Lynne as a song Springfield could have sung.

Asked in 2012 of the possibility of her Dusty Springfield tribute serving as template for another album saluting a revered singer, Lynne replied: "Hell no. She was it. I think every [singer's] career [allows for] one cover album[: more and] you turn into a [bleep]ing jukebox. If you want to hear [another singer's song] go listen to the original."

== Release and impact ==
Lynne would recall: "We cut the [album] the week Capitol Records busted up. So we're downstairs wondering why upstairs isn't coming down to check us out. Turns out there was no upstairs there." Lynne pitched her album to Lost Highway Records who released Just a Little Lovin' 29 January 2008 with a promotional EP recorded in conjunction with radio station KCRW released four days prior to the album. Outside the United States and Canada, the album was distributed by Mercury Records whose UK division had in 1999 given the I Am Shelby Lynne album its first release. The sole single from the album, "Anyone Who Had a Heart", was released through the US edition of iTunes on December 18, 2007.

In its debut week of sales, the album garnered a career sales high for Lynne, according to Billboard. While this album entered the magazine's main album chart (the Billboard 200) within the 50 most popular albums of the week, Lynne's previous album (Suit Yourself) had failed to make the chart.

== Critical reception ==
Professional ratings
Aggregate scores
| Source | Rating |
|---|---|
| Metacritic | 82/100 link |
Review scores
| Source | Rating |
| AllMusic | link |
| Being There | link |
| The Buffalo News | link |
| The Dallas Morning News | A− link |
| Details | link |
| Entertainment Weekly | A− link |
| The Guardian | link |
| Rolling Stone | link |
| USA Today | link |

The reimagining of Springfield's songs has been a frequent mention in reviews of the album, e.g. the four-star critique by Bill Friskics-Warren in Nashville's largest newspaper, The Tennessean: Friskics-Warren, who found Lynne's "Delta-bred vocals...as supple and expressive as any this side of Bobbie Gentry", opined that "in terms of phrasing and arrangements Lynne's performances sound almost nothing like Springfield's originals. Peeling back the [originals'] sweeping orchestras and production...Lynne and her emphatic rhythm section reinvent Dusty's material, underscoring the desperation and vulnerability at [each song's] core". Jim Farber, a critic for the New York Daily News, stated in his review that Lynne "[makes] Springfield's hits her own by inverting them on almost every level."

While reviews were generally favorable for the album, some critics missed the more forceful vocal style which had characterized the original versions by Springfield — and also Lynne's own previous albums. As Louisville Courier-Journal critic Jeffrey Lee Puckett wrote in his album review, "She instead decided to make the record one long, slow burn — very slow, to the point where most songs tend to barely ignite or even bleed together. The result is, at best, killer make-out music and, at worst, background for a pleasant meal." George Lang, reviewing Just a Little Lovin' for The Daily Oklahoman, opined that Lynne "could not sing a dishonest syllable if she tried" but that her "emotion-drenched vocals" were impeded by the "sleepy spare arrangements" with which the album replaced the "lushness" of Dusty in Memphis: (George Lang quote:) "It's not as if Lynne is averse [to] big production: this disc could have been transcendent if [produced by] Bill Bottrell, the gifted eccentric who produced...I Am Shelby Lynne...Lynne deserves to be surrounded in sounds as big as her personality. As it is, Just a Little Lovin' is a mild affair that could have been a torrid romance."

The album garnered one award nomination in the Best Engineered Non-Classical Album category for the 51st Grammy Awards, recognizing the work of album engineer Al Schmitt. Just a Little Lovin' lost to the eventual winner, Consolers of the Lonely, performed by The Raconteurs.

== Track listing ==
Just a Little Lovin' track listing
| No. | Title | Writer(s) | Springfield album | Length |
|---|---|---|---|---|
| 1. | "Just a Little Lovin'" | Barry Mann, Cynthia Weil | Dusty in Memphis (1969) | 5:19 |
| 2. | "Anyone Who Had a Heart" | Burt Bacharach, Hal David | A Girl Called Dusty (1964) | 3:13 |
| 3. | "You Don't Have to Say You Love Me" | Vicki Wickham, Simon Napier-Bell, Pino Donaggio, Vito Pallavicini | You Don't Have to Say You Love Me (1966) | 4:11 |
| 4. | "I Only Want to Be with You" | Mike Hawker, Ivor Raymonde | Stay Awhile/I Only Want to Be with You (1964) | 3:50 |
| 5. | "The Look of Love" | Burt Bacharach, Hal David | The Look of Love (1967) | 3:21 |
| 6. | "Breakfast in Bed" | Eddie Hinton, Donnie Fritts | Dusty in Memphis | 3:21 |
| 7. | "Willie and Laura Mae Jones" | Tony Joe White | See All Her Faces (1972) | 4:08 |
| 8. | "I Don't Want to Hear It Anymore" | Randy Newman | Dusty in Memphis | 4:37 |
| 9. | "Pretend" | Shelby Lynn | Not a Springfield song | 3:06 |
| 10. | "How Can I Be Sure" | Felix Cavaliere, Eddie Brigati | Non-LP single (1970) | 3:37 |
| Total length: | | | | 38:43 |

Released on UK edition
| No. | Title | Writer(s) | Springfield album | Length |
|---|---|---|---|---|
| 11. | "Wishin' and Hopin'" | Burt Bacharach, Hal David | A Girl Called Dusty | 4:41 |
| Total length: | | | | 43:24 |

== Personnel ==
- Kevin Axt – bass guitar, upright bass
- Curt Bisquera – drums
- Jill Dell'Abate – production coordination
- Gregg Field – drums
- Steve Genewick – assistant
- Shelby Lynne – acoustic guitar, electric guitar, lead vocals, backing vocals
- Rob Mathes – keyboards
- Karen Naff – design
- Dean Parks – acoustic guitar, electric guitar
- Phil Ramone – producer
- Randee Saint Nicholas – photography
- Doug Sax – mastering
- Al Schmitt – engineer, mixing

== Charts ==
Chart performance for Just a Little Lovin'
| Chart (2008) | Peak position |
|---|---|
| Dutch Albums (Album Top 100) | 46 |
| Swedish Albums (Sverigetopplistan) | 58 |
| US Billboard 200 | 41 |
