= As Simple as That =

Single by Mike Reid

from the album Turning for Home
- B-side: "This Road"
- Released: July 13, 1991
- Genre: Country
- Length: 3:28
- Label: Columbia
- Songwriters: Mike Reid; Allen Shamblin
- Producer: Steve Buckingham

Mike Reid singles chronology
"Till You Were Gone" (1991)	"As Simple as That" (1991)	"I'll Stop Loving You" (1991)

"As Simple as That" is a song co-written and recorded by American country music artist Mike Reid. It was released in July 1991 as the third single from his album Turning for Home. The song reached number 14 on the Billboard Hot Country Singles & Tracks chart in October 1991. Reid wrote the song with Allen Shamblin.

== Chart performance ==
Chart (1991)	Peak position
Canada Country Singles (RPM)	11
US Hot Country Songs (Billboard)	14
