= Tough All Over (Shelby Lynne album) =

Studio album by Shelby Lynne
- Released: June 27, 1990
- Studio: The Bennett House, Franklin, TN
- Genre: Country
- Label: Epic
- Producer: Bob Montgomery

Shelby Lynne chronology
Sunrise (1989)	Tough All Over (1990)	Soft Talk (1991)

Tough All Over is the second studio album by American country music songwriter Shelby Lynne. It was released in 1990 via Epic Records. It includes the singles "I'll Lie Myself to Sleep" and "Things Are Tough All Over".

== Content ==
The album includes several cover songs: "Lonely Weekends" was originally released by Charlie Rich, "I Walk the Line" by Johnny Cash, and "Don't Get Around Much Anymore" by Duke Ellington.

== Critical reception ==
Thom Jurek of Allmusic rated the album 4 out of 5 stars, saying that "It just isn't a strictly country outing, but it's a truly fine pop-country record."

== Track listing ==
1. "I'll Lie Myself to Sleep" (Tony Haselden, Tim Mensy) - 4:06
2. "Don't Mind If I Do" (Skip Ewing) - 2:41
3. "Lonely Weekends" (Charlie Rich) - 2:24
4. "Things Are Tough All Over" (Trey Bruce, Lisa Silver) - 3:58
5. "Dog Day Afternoon" (Wayne Carson) - 3:42
6. "Baby's Gone Blues" (Pat Bunch, Pam Rose, Mary Ann Kennedy) - 3:19
7. "Till a Better Memory Comes Along" (Mensy, Gene Dobbins, Glenn Ray) - 2:42
8. "I Walk the Line" (Johnny Cash) - 2:38
9. "What About the Love We Made" (John Rotch) - 3:42
10. "Don't Get Around Much Anymore" (Duke Ellington, Bob Russell) - 2:50

== Charts ==
=== Weekly charts ===
Chart (1990–91)	Peak position
US Top Country Albums (Billboard)	31

=== Year-end charts ===
Chart (1991)	Position
US Top Country Albums (Billboard)	61

=== Singles ===
Year	Single	Peak chart positions	
Year	Single	US Country	CAN Country
1990	"I'll Lie Myself to Sleep"	26	37
1990	"Things Are Tough All Over"	23	19
1991	"What About the Love We Made"	45	86
