= Sunrise (Shelby Lynne album) =

Studio album by Shelby Lynne
- Released: September 12, 1989
- Genre: Country
- Label: Epic
- Producer: Billy Sherrill; Bob Montgomery

Shelby Lynne chronology
Sunrise (1989)	Tough All Over (1990)

Sunrise is the debut studio album of American country music singer Shelby Lynne. It was released in 1989 via Epic Records Nashville. Two singles were released from it: "The Hurtin' Side" and "Little Bits and Pieces".

== Content ==
The album includes "Till You Were Gone", which was later covered by Mike Reid on his 1991 album Turning for Home. Bob Montgomery produced tracks 1, 3, 5, 6, and 10, while Billy Sherrill produced the rest of the album.

== Critical reception ==
Giving it 3.5 out of 4 stars, Jack Hurst of the Chicago Tribune said that Lynne "can do it all vocally" and that her "music seems to well hotly out of dark and complex depths".

== Track listing ==
1. "The Hurtin' Side" (Mike Reid, Rory Bourke) - 2:31
2. "Little Bits and Pieces" (Dean Dillon, Hank Cochran) - 3:46
3. "Thinking About You Again" (Stephony Smith, Mike Porter) - 3:07
4. "This Time I Almost Made It" (Billy Sherrill) - 3:11
5. "What About This Girl" (Madeline Stone, Randy Boudreaux) - 2:31
6. "Till You Were Gone" (Reid, Bourke) - 3:30
7. "I Love You So Much It Hurts" (Floyd Tillman) - 3:21
8. "That's Where It Hurts" (Mark A. Barnette, Grady Ross Barnette, Ron Muir) - 2:32
9. "I'm Confessin'" (Al J. Neiburg, Daughtery Reynolds) - 3:43
10. "Your Love Stays with Me" (Reid, Bourke) - 2:57

== Charts ==
Albums

Chart (1989)	Peak position
US Top Country Albums (Billboard)	61

Singles

Year	Single	Peak chart positions	
Year	Single	US Country	CAN Country
1989	"The Hurtin' Side"	38	—
1989	"Little Bits and Pieces"	62	85
