= Till You Were Gone =

Single by Mike Reid

from the album Turning for Home
- B-side: "Everything to Me"
- Released: March 25, 1991
- Genre: Country
- Length: 3:01
- Label: Columbia
- Songwriters: Mike Reid; Rory Bourke
- Producer: Steve Buckingham

Mike Reid singles chronology
"Walk on Faith" (1990)	"Till You Were Gone" (1991)	"As Simple as That" (1991)

"Till You Were Gone" is a song co-written and recorded by American country music artist Mike Reid. It was released in March 1991 as the second single from his album Turning for Home. It peaked at #17 on the U.S. Billboard Hot Country Singles & Tracks chart and at #8 on the Canadian RPM Country Tracks chart. This song followed Reid's number-one debut single, "Walk on Faith." Reid wrote the song with Rory Bourke.

The song was originally recorded by Shelby Lynne on her 1989 album Sunrise.

== Chart performance ==
Chart (1991)	Peak position
Canada Country Singles (RPM)	8
US Hot Country Songs (Billboard)	17

=== Year-end charts ===
Chart (1991)	Position
Canada Country Tracks (RPM)	94
