= I'll Stop Loving You =

Single by Mike Reid

from the album Turning for Home
- B-side: "Even a Strong Man"
- Released: November 9, 1991
- Genre: Country
- Length: 3:22
- Label: Columbia Nashville
- Songwriters: Mike Reid, Robert Byrne
- Producer: Steve Buckingham

Mike Reid singles chronology
"As Simple as That" (1991)	"I'll Stop Loving You" (1991)	"I Got a Life" (1992)

"I'll Stop Loving You" is a song co-written and recorded by American country music artist Mike Reid. It was released in November 1991 as the fourth single from the album Turning for Home. The song reached number 23 on the Billboard Hot Country Singles & Tracks chart. The song was written by Reid and Robert Byrne.

== Chart performance ==
Chart (1991–1992)	Peak position
Canada Country Singles (RPM)	11
US Hot Country Songs (Billboard)	23
