= I Can't Imagine (album) =

Studio album by Shelby Lynne
- Released: May 5, 2015
- Genre: Country
- Length: 40:47
- Label: Rounder Records
- Producer: Shelby Lynne

Shelby Lynne chronology
Revelation Road (2011)	I Can't Imagine (2015)	Not Dark Yet (with Allison Moorer) (2017)

I Can't Imagine is the thirteenth studio album by American country music singer/songwriter Shelby Lynne. The album was released on May 5, 2015 by Rounder Records. It peaked at No. 5 on the Billboard Folk Albums chart.

== Critical reception ==
Professional ratings
Aggregate scores
Source	Rating
AnyDecentMusic?	7.2/10
Metacritic	77/100
Review scores
Source	Rating
AllMusic	3.5/5 stars
Slant Magazine	3/5 stars
American Songwriter	3.5/5 stars

According to Metacritic, I Can’t Imagine has a score for this album is 77/100, as of 28 March 2020, says the album has "generally favorable reviews based on 11 critic reviews."

Thom Jurek of AllMusic concludes his review with, "I Can't Imagine is confident, assured, and fiercely independent. What ties its various threads together is the songwriter's unguarded heart, expressed by her near iconic vocal prowess, and we've come to expect nothing less from Lynne."

Meredith Ochs reviews I Can't Imagine for NPR and begins, "With her voice alone, Shelby Lynne conveys a devastating spectrum of feelings - the pain of lost love and loneliness delivered in sweet, sultry tones. Add steel guitar and wide, open arrangements, as she does on her new album, and she turns emotional confusion into something so achingly beautiful that you don't want it to end."

Sam C. Mac of Slant Magazine gives the album 3 out of a possible 5 stars and concludes his review with, "Had she toned down some idiosyncrasies and worried a handful of these songs past what sounds like their draft stages, I Can't Imagine could’ve been a real coup for Lynne, proving that the record labels need her as decisively as she’s proven she doesn’t need them."

Hal Horowitz of American Songwriter gives the album 3½ out of a possible 5 stars and writes, "it's the pure Dusty Springfield soul of 'Sold the Devil (Sunshine)' and the slinky swamp of 'Be in the Now' that finds Lynne at her loosest and most natural. A few more tunes in this vein would be welcome, but everything here captures the classy, sometimes sassy and always heartfelt essence that makes Shelby Lynne one of her generation’s most passionate and determined voices."

Stephen L. Betts reviews the album for Rolling Stone and writes, "For her 13th full-length album, I Can't Imagine, the Grammy winner once again draws on her roots and her myriad influences, delivering 10 new tunes she has written or co-written."

== Track listing ==
All tracks are written by Shelby Lynne, unless otherwise noted.

No.	Title	Writer(s)	Length
1.	"Paper Van Gogh"		3:22
2.	"Back Door Front Porch"		4:31
3.	"Sold the Devil (Sunshine)"	Shelby Lynne; Ben Peeler	4:08
4.	"Son of a Gun"		5:19
5.	"Down Here"		4:57
6.	"Love Is Strong"	Shelby Lynne; Ron Sexsmith	3:44
7.	"Better"		4:32
8.	"Be in the Now"	Shelby Lynne; Ron Sexsmith	3:28
9.	"Following You"		3:42
10.	"I Can't Imagine"	Shelby Lynne; Pete Donnelly	3:04
Total length:			40:47

== Musicians ==
"Paper Van Gogh"

- Shelby Lynne – Vocals, Acoustic Guitar, Harmony Vocals
- Ed Maxwell – Upright Acoustic Bass
- Ben Peeler – Acoustic Guitar, Electric Guitar
- Michael Jerome – Drums, Percussion
- Brendan Buckley – Percussion
- Christopher Joyner – Piano

"Back Door Front Porch"

- Shelby Lynne – Vocals, Acoustic Guitar, Backing Vocals
- Ed Maxwell – Upright Acoustic Bass, Moog Synthesizer
- Clarence Greenwood – Backing Vocals
- Michael Jerome – Drums
- Pete Donnelly – Hammond Organ
- Ben Peeler – Weissenborn Slide Guitar, Electric Guitar

"Sold The Devil (Sunshine)"

- Shelby Lynne – Vocals, Backing Vocals
- Michael Jerome – Drums, Backing Vocals
- Ed Maxwell – Electric Bass, Backing Vocals
- Ben Peeler – Electric Guitar
- Pete Donnelly – WurlitzerOrgan
- Brendan Buckley – Percussion

"Son Of A Gun"

- Shelby Lynne – Vocals, Acoustic Guitar
- Ed Maxwell – Upright Acoustic Bass, Upright Bass Percussion
- Ben Peeler – Acoustic Guitar, Electric Guitar, Lap Steel Guitar, Twelve-String Acoustic Guitar
- Michael Jerome – Drums
- Brendan Buckley – Percussion
- Pete Donnelly – Piano

"Down Here"

- Shelby Lynne – Vocals, Acoustic Guitar
- Clarence Greenwood – Backing Vocals
- Michael Jerome – Drums, Backing Vocals
- Ed Maxwell – Electric Bass, Backing Vocals
- Pete Donnelly – Electric Guitar
- Ben Peeler – Electric Guitar, Pedal Steel Guitar
- Christopher Joyner – Wurlitzer Organ, B3 Organ
- Brendan Buckley – Percussion

"Love Is Strong"

- Shelby Lynne – Vocals, Acoustic Guitar
- Ed Maxwell – Upright Acoustic Bass, Moog Synthesizer
- Brendan Buckley – Drums
- Michael Jerome – Drums
- Ben Peeler – Electric Guitar
- Christopher Joyner – Piano

"Better"

- Shelby Lynne – Vocals, Acoustic Guitar, Backing Vocals
- Ben Peeler – Acoustic Guitar, Lap Steel Guitar, Rickenbacker Twelve-String Guitar
- Pete Donnelly – Acoustic Guitar, Piano, Vocals
- Clarence Greenwood – Backing Vocals
- Ed Maxwell – Bass, Organ
- Michael Jerome – Drums, Percussion, Vocals
- Brendan Buckley – Percussion

"Be In The Now"

- Shelby Lynne – Vocals, Acoustic Guitar
- Ed Maxwell – Upright Acoustic Bass
- Ben Peeler – Acoustic Guitar, Weissenborn Slide Guitar
- Michael Jerome – Drums, Percussion
- Christopher Joyner – Wurlitzer Organ
- Brendan Buckley – Percussion

"Following You"

- Shelby Lynne – Vocals, Acoustic Guitar, Piano
- Ben Peeler – Acoustic Guitar, Pedal Steel Guitar
- Leni Stern – Lute (N'goni Intro)

"I Can't Imagine"

- Shelby Lynne – Vocals, Acoustic Guitar, Backing Vocals
- Michael Jerome – Drums
- Ed Maxwell – Electric Bass
- Pete Donnelly – Electric Guitar, Backing Vocals
- Ben Peeler – Pedal Steel Guitar, Acoustic Guitar, Twelve-String Acoustic Guitar
- Christopher Joyner – Piano

== Production ==
- Producer – Shelby Lynne
- A&R – Scott Billington
- Booking – Bruce Solar, Ronnie Lapone
- Associate Producer – Ben Peeler
- Package Design – Andrew Pham
- Executive Producer – John Burk
- Management – Elizabeth Jordan
- Mastered By – Clint Holley, Paul Blakemore
- Mixed by Shelby Lynne
- Mixed and recorded by Seth Presant
- Photography by Alexandra Hedison
- Recorded by Chris Rondinella
- Recorded by Steve Reynolds

Track information and credits adapted the album's liner notes.

== Charts ==
Chart (2015)	Peak position
US Americana/Folk Albums (Billboard)	5
Top Current Album Sales	88
US Indie Store Album Sales (Billboard)	20
