= Walk on Faith =

Single by Mike Reid

from the album Turning for Home
- B-side: "Turning for Home"
- Released: November 12, 1990
- Genre: Country
- Length: 3:09
- Label: Columbia
- Songwriters: Mike Reid; Allen Shamblin
- Producer: Steve Buckingham

Mike Reid singles chronology
"Old Folks" (1988)	"Walk on Faith" (1990)	"Till You Were Gone" (1991)

"Walk on Faith" is the debut single by American country music artist Mike Reid, released in November 1990. It is from his 1991 debut studio album Turning for Home. The song became his only number one country hit in February 1991. Reid wrote the song with Allen Shamblin.

== Music video ==
The music video was directed and produced by Deaton Flanigen.

== Critical reception ==
Thom Owens of AllMusic cited "Walk on Faith" as a standout track on Reid's album, calling it a "surging hit [single]" and one of the "best moments" on the album. Alanna Nash of Entertainment Weekly also described the song favorably, saying, "His upbeat songs ('Walk on Faith') work as both thoughtful and intimate vignettes and as snappy radio rotation."

== Chart performance ==
Reid turned his focus to songwriting in the 1970s, writing hits for Ronnie Milsap and charting as a guest vocalist on Milsap's "Old Folks", a number 2 single in 1988.

"Walk on Faith" was Reid's first solo single, released in 1990 on Columbia Records. It spent twenty weeks on the U.S. Billboard Hot Country Singles & Tracks (now Hot Country Songs) charts. It debuted at number 64 on the chart dated for November 24, 1990 and peaked at number 1 on the chart dated for February 23, 1991. The song was also his only number one on the RPM Country Tracks charts in Canada.

Chart (1990–1991)	Peak position
Canada Country Singles (RPM)	1
US Hot Country Songs (Billboard)	1

=== Year-end charts ===
Chart (1991)	Position
Canada Country Tracks (RPM)	36
US Country Songs (Billboard)	13
