= Twilight Town =

Studio album by Mike Reid
- Released: September 29, 1992
- Recorded: 1991–92
- Genre: Country
- Label: Columbia
- Producer: Peter Bunetta, Rick Chudacoff

Mike Reid chronology
Turning for Home (1991)	Twilight Town (1992)

Professional ratings
Review scores
Source	Rating
AllMusic	3/5 stars

Twilight Town is the second and final album by American country music singer and former American football player Mike Reid. It was released in 1992 via Columbia Records. It includes the singles "Keep On Walkin'" and "Call Home", which respectively reached Nos. 45 and 43 on the U.S. country singles chart. It closes with his own version of "I Can't Make You Love Me," which he and collaborator Allen Shamblin wrote for Bonnie Raitt, and which has been covered by many other performers.

== Track listing ==
1. "A Man with a Hammer" (Reid, Allen Shamblin) – 2:51
2. "Some Somebody" (Reid, Troy Seals, Rhonda Gunn) – 4:01
3. "Back in the Fire" (Reid, Rory Michael Bourke) – 3:36
4. "Keep On Walkin'" (Reid, Amanda McBride) – 3:00
5. "Call Home" (Reid, Seals) – 3:36
6. "Hurtin' Side" (Reid, Bourke) – 3:25
7. "Workin' with the Right Tools" (Reid, Kent Robbins) – 3:46
8. "One Night" (Reid, Seals) – 3:26
9. "I'll Never Have the Heart to Leave This Town" (Reid, Steve Seskin) – 4:27
10. "Love Without Mercy" (Reid, Don Pfrimmer) – 4:05
11. "I Can't Make You Love Me" (Reid, Shamblin) – 4:12

== Chart performance ==
Chart (1992)	Peak position
U.S. Billboard Top Country Albums	59
