= Trey Taylor (singer) =

American record producer and songwriter

- Born: Trey Taylor; Denver, Colorado, U.S.
- Occupations: singer; songwriter
- Label: Go Time
- Website: https://www.treytaylormusic.com/

Trey Taylor is an American singer and songwriter.

== Musical career ==
Taylor was born and raised in Loveland, Colorado by a single mother.

On April 8, 2015, as a 16-year old high school student, Taylor recorded and released "Back on My Mind Again". As a result, he was signed to Kent Wells Productions and later Go Time Records in Nashville. Wells is a producer and music consultant for Dolly Parton and collaborator with other recording artists.

Taylor plans a new album, produced by Starstruck Entertainment's Narvel Blackstock, former management for Reba McEntire. The album will include a duet with American country music singer and pianist Ronnie Milsap.

In addition to his music, Taylor supports children's literacy, animal welfare, and housing initiatives.

== Discography ==
- "Back on My Mind Again" (single) (2015)
- Ocean in His Eyes (album) (2019) with songs co-written by Mike Reid
- Country from Day One (album) (pending 2025)

== Awards and recognitions ==
2022 - Key to the City, presented by Mayor George McGill, Fort Smith, Arkansas
