= Temptation (Shelby Lynne album) =

Studio album by Shelby Lynne
- Released: July 6, 1993
- Studio: Creative Recording (Berry Hill, Tennessee)
- Genre: Country, Western swing
- Length: 34:13
- Label: Morgan Creek/Mercury
- Producer: Brent Maher

Shelby Lynne chronology
Soft Talk (1991)	Temptation (1993)	Restless (1995)

Temptation is the fourth studio album by American country singer-songwriter Shelby Lynne, released July 6, 1993. Two songs, "Tell Me I'm Crazy"and "I Need a Heart to Come Home To", were released as singles and one of the tracks, "I Need a Heart to Come Home To", featured on the soundtrack to Tony Scott's 1993 film True Romance.

== Background and release ==
Following her first three albums, Lynne left her record label Epic and began working with Brent Maher. In a 2009 interview, she said of the move, "After Soft Talk, I knew I had to take control. Hell, if I wasn’t going to be embraced by country radio, I might as well make critically acclaimed albums! I wanted to cross genres and not make that silly-ass country pop." She went on to say, "I consider Temptation the real beginning of my career." Lynne co-wrote two songs on the album, the title track and "Some of That True Love".

Temptation was released on July 6, 1993 on Mercury Records and Morgan Creek. The album reached No. 55 on the US Billboard Country Albums chart and No. 21 on the Heatseekers Albums chart. Two songs from the album were released as singles: "Feelin' Kind of Lonely Tonight", which reached No. 69 on the US Hot Country Songs chart, and "Tell Me I'm Crazy", which failed to chart. "I Need a Heart to Come Home To" was included on the soundtrack of Tony Scott's 1993 film True Romance.

== Reception ==
Professional ratings
Review scores
Source	Rating
AllMusic	4/5 stars

Writing for AllMusic, Thom Jurek praised the album and gave it a star-rating of four out of five. He noted that the album was markedly different from Lynne's previous albums Tough All Over (1990) and Soft Talk (1991) and described it as "hardcore jacked-up Western swing and big-band country". He cited "Temptation", "Don't Cry for Me" and "Some of That True Love" as highlights and summed up the review by calling the album "hip, sassy, and tough."

== Track listing ==
1. "Temptation" (Shelby Lynne, Brent Maher, Jamie O'Hara) – 3:04
2. "Feelin' Kind of Lonely Tonight" (Maher, O'Hara) – 3:00
3. "Tell Me I'm Crazy" (Rory Bourke, Mike Reid) – 3:44
4. "Little Unlucky at Love" (Maher, O'Hara) – 3:01
5. "Some of That True Love" (Lynne, Maher, O'Hara) – 2:47
6. "The Rain Might Wash Your Love Away" (Maher, Don Potter, Don Schlitz) – 4:34
7. "Don't Cry for Me" (Maher) – 2:43
8. "I Need a Heart to Come Home To" (John Jarvis, Russell Smith) – 4:20
9. "Come a Little Closer" (Maher, O'Hara) – 3:15
10. "Where Do We Go from Here" (Maher, Potter, Reid) – 3:38

== Personnel ==
Music

- Jeff Bailey – trumpet
- Eddie Bayers – drums
- Ernie Collins – bass trombone
- Paul Franklin – steel guitar
- Dennis Good – trombone
- Barry Green – trombone
- Rob Hajacos – fiddle
- Michael Haynes – trumpet
- Randy Howard – fiddle
- Shelby Lynne – lead vocals, background vocals
- Brent Mason – electric guitar
- Chris McDonald – trombone
- Craig Nelson – bass guitar, acoustic bass
- Bobby Ogdin – piano
- Don Potter – acoustic guitar
- Billy Puett – tenor saxophone
- Buddy Skipper – horn arrangements
- Denis Solee – alto saxophone
- George Tidwell – trumpet
- Ron Tutt – drums

Production

- Mills Logan – assistant engineer
- Brent Maher – producer, engineer, mixing
- Jim McKell – assistant engineer, mixing assistant
- Glenn Meadows – mastering

Design

- Daniela Federici – photography
- Shannon Gibbons – stylist
- Buddy Jackson – art direction
- Sam Knight – design
- Beth Lee – design
- Lisa Jayne Storey – make-up, hair stylist

== Chart performance ==
Chart (1993)	Peak position
U.S. Billboard Top Country Albums	55
U.S. Billboard Top Heatseekers	21
