= Dead Ideas =

Serbian punk/thrash band

Background information
- Also known as: D.I.
- Origin: Belgrade, Serbia, Yugoslavia
- Genres: Hardcore punk • crossover thrash • rap metal
- Years active: 1990; 1991–1996
- Labels: Start Today, Silver Cross, B92, No Time To Be Wasted, Resume Tapes, Nuclearsunpunk, Humanita Nova
- Spinoffs: Osmi Putnik Dva, Yobo, Eyesburn, Sunshine
- Past members: Aleksandar Keserović; Darko Marković; Igor Škoro; Jelena Komnenić; Mirko Radošević; Nemanja Kojić; Ninoslav Filipović

Dead Ideas were a Serbian hardcore punk/crossover thrash band from Belgrade.

== History ==
The band was formed in 1990 by bassist and vocalist Darko Marković, however, after their first live appearance, the band disbanded. In January of the following year, Marković reformed the band with the female vocalist Jelena Komnenić and guitarist Nemanja Kojić, soon being joined by the drummer Igor Škoro. In April of the same year, the band recorded four songs at the Belgrade Focus studio, released on their debut 7" extended play Welcome To The Abyss by the indie record label Start Today Records.

During May 1992, the band recorded eight new songs at the M studio in Novi Sad, but the recordings were not released due to the band not being able to find a record label. The material was eventually self-released by the band as Dead Ideas Promo Tape, on compact cassette. One of the songs from the recorded material appeared on the various artists compilation Tito Nikada Više!, and two appeared as bonus tracks on their debut album Where To?, again self-released by the band in 1993.

In January 1994, the band recorded the song "Wrong" in the Radio B92 studio after having a successful performance at the Palilula Culture Olympics, released on the various artists compilation Radio Utopia (B92: 1989-1994). The song appeared on the reissue of the debut album Where To? by Silver Cross Records in 1994. With the exception of the track, and two tracks from the promo tape, the band recorded the material at the DA studio in Banovci, produced by the Svarog member Zoran Đuroski.

During 1994, the band performed at a festival held in the Italian town Rovigo, organized to raise funds for restoring the Sarajevo city library. The band also toured Slovenia and Greece. Dead Ideas recordings also appeared on several international various artists compilations, including the Croatian No Border compilation and Sretna mladost, the Greek Independent Vibrations and the Dutch Women against the war.

The band also participated the recording of the movie Geto (Ghetto), starring the Električni Orgazam drummer Goran Čavajda "Čavke", about the Belgrade underground rock scene, which was premiered in 1995. During the Winter of the same year, the band released the Rejection EP, available on both 12" LP and compact cassette, featuring four tracks, released by Silver Cross Records. In the meantime, the band got a new guitar player, Ninoslav Filipović "Nino", as Kojić left the band, forming Eyesburn. Soon after, the band disbanded.

In twentieth of September 2023, group announced a remastered music video of the song "Wrong". The video has been restored, digitized, arranged in the original spirit with proper color correction. Music and video was remastered by a young producer and filmmaker Mihajlo Kitevski.

At the same time, group released a music video of their old song "War Games". "War Games" is an anti-war song by Dead Ideas, a hardcore band from Belgrade, Serbia. The song was recorded in 1992 as the band's response to the wars in former Yugoslavia. It appeared on their album "Where to?", published in 1993. The video was entirely filmed at one of the Dead Ideas' gigs at the underground club BUNKER in Belgrade.

== Members ==
- Darko Marković – bass
- Jelena Komnenić – lead vocals
- Mirko Radošević Lima – guitar
- Aleksandar Keserović Aca – drums
- Nemanja Kojić Kojot – guitar
- Igor Škoro – drums
- Ninoslav Filipović Nino – guitar

== Discography ==
- Welcome To The Abyss 7" (1991, Start Today Records)
- Promo Tape (1992, self-released)
- Where To? tape album (1993, DIDC Tapes; re-released in 1995 by Silver Cross Records)
- Recetaron tape/12" EP (1995, Silver Cross Records)
- Live at MKNŽ, Ilirska Bistrica, 12th January, 1996. tape (2021, Ill In The Head Records)

=== Other appearances ===
- Tito nikada više ! (1992)
- It's Up To You... (1994)
- No Border compilation (1994),
- Independent Vibrations (1994)
- Radio Utopia (B92: 1989-1994) (1994)
- Sretna mladost (1994)
- Mi za mir (1995)
- It's All So Quiet On The Eastern Front (1996)
- Nećemo i nedamo (1997)

== Videography ==
- Geto (1995)
