= Things Are Tough All Over (song) =

Single by Shelby Lynne

from the album Tough All Over
- B-side: "I Walk the Line"
- Released: September 1990
- Genre: Country
- Length: 3:58
- Label: Epic
- Songwriters: Trey Bruce; Lisa Silver
- Producer: Bob Montgomery

Shelby Lynne singles chronology
"I'll Lie Myself to Sleep" (1990)	"Things Are Tough All Over" (1990)	"What About the Love We Made" (1991)

"Things Are Tough All Over" is a song recorded by American country music artist Shelby Lynne. It was released in September 1990 as the second single from her album Tough All Over. The song peaked at number 23 on the Billboard Hot Country Singles & Tracks chart and reached number 19 on the RPM Country Tracks chart in Canada.

== Chart performance ==
Chart (1990–1991)	Peak position
Canada Country Singles (RPM)	19
US Hot Country Songs (Billboard)	23
