= Silver Cross Records =

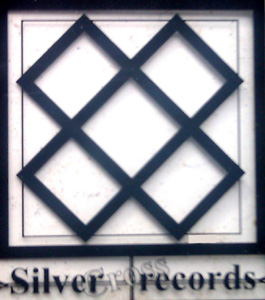
- Founded: 1993
- Founder: Sargin Georgije
- Genre: Alternative Rock, Heavy Metal
- Country of origin: Serbia
- Location: Belgrade

Silver Cross Records is alternative rock and heavy metal label founded in Belgrade, Serbia. Officially started in March of 1993 label was disbanded in 1997. In the middle of war in Yugoslavia this label propagated anti-war messages to the public in Serbia, in the form of anti-war music projects.

The main project for this label is “Witness of the 1st Discussion” compilation album which includes 9 bands. The message "dedicated to all young people fled from their country running away from a senseless war." is printed in the booklet The cover page is the blackest possible and this is also perverse and warning message associated with music that stretches over 16 songs sung in English

Silver Cross Records has been awarded as the best music company in Serbia for 1995 by Index Radio.

== Artists ==
Artists that have been signed and published for Silver Cross Records include:

- Avangarda+
- Dead Ideas
- Definite Choice
- Urgh! (band)
- Eyesburn
- Rapid Force
- Bloodbath(Serbia)
- Wulckdroff
- Gymnastics(Laka Gimnastika)
- Stentor
- Bad Taste
- Pure
- Hitman
- Stand Point
- Austerity

== Cover artwork ==
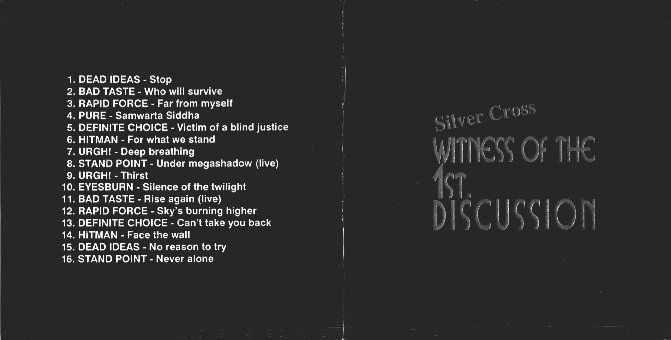
Silver Cross – Witness of the 1st Discussion

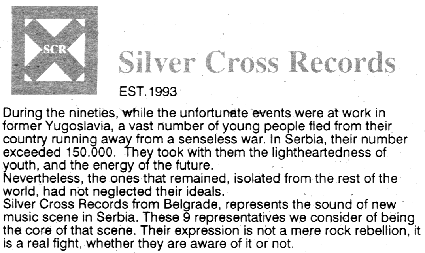
Witness Of The 1st Discussion – Booklet 1st Page

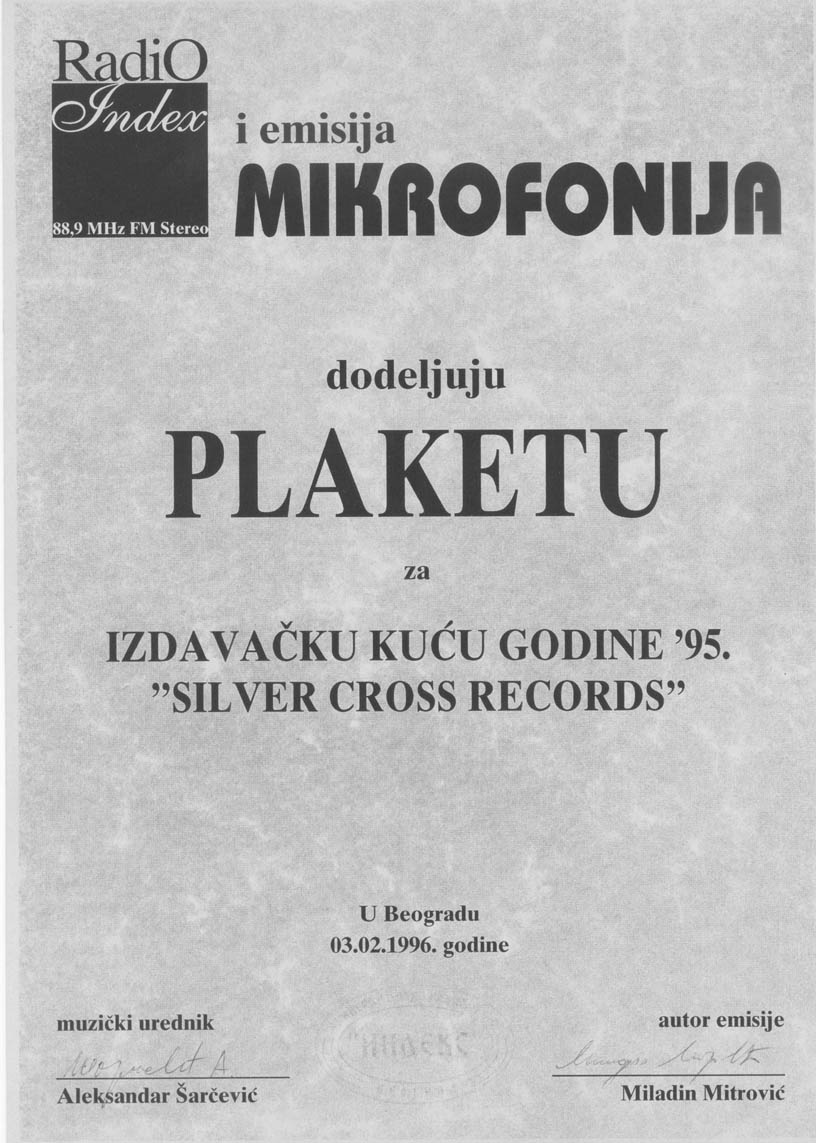
Award for the best music company in Serbia – Radio Index

== See also ==
- List of record labels
