= Merry Christmas (Shelby Lynne album) =

Studio album by Shelby Lynne
- Released: October 12, 2010
- Studio: Slideaway Studios, Sunland, CA; Wax Ltd, Hollywood, CA
- Genre: Holiday
- Length: 33:02
- Label: Everso
- Producer: Shelby Lynne

Shelby Lynne chronology
Tears, Lies and Alibis (2010)	Merry Christmas (2010)	Revelation Road (2011)

Merry Christmas is the first holiday album by American singer/songwriter Shelby Lynne. It was released on October 12, 2010 by her own label, Everso Records. The album charted at No. 9 on Billboard's folk chart and No. 31 on their holiday chart.

== Critical reception ==
Professional ratings
Review scores
Source	Rating
AllMusic	4/5 stars

Thom Jurek of AllMusic writes, "As Christmas albums go, this one is showcase for Lynne's gifts as an interpretive singer and songwriter. It's enjoyable throughout, and the immediacy and warmth of the recording set it apart from the usual holiday fare."

Tony Peters of Icon Fetch says, "She serves up eleven tracks in a little over 30 minutes and it’s over before you know it. Typical of her original work, there’s some happy and some sad songs here, but nothing overstays their welcome."

Dan MacIntosh of Country Standard Time writes, "This song set provides holiday music for quiet nights before Christmas or hangover-spoiled Christmas mornings. But no matter what way you use it, Merry Christmas! has Shelby Lynne's unique fingerprint on it."

== Track listing ==
No.	Title	Writer(s)	Length
1.	"Sleigh Ride/Winter Wonderland"	Leroy Anderson; Mitchell Parish / Richard B. Smith; Felix Bernard	1:54
2.	"Ain't Nothin' like Christmas"	Shelby Lynne	3:16
3.	"Christmas Time Is Here"	Lee Mendelson; Vince Guaraldi	2:07
4.	"Silver Bells"	Jay Livingston; Ray Evans	3:35
5.	"Christmas Time Is Coming"	Benjamin F. Logan	2:59
6.	"O Holy Night"	Adolphe Adam; Placide Cappeau; John Sullivan Dwight	3:51
7.	"Santa Claus Is Coming to Town"	John Frederick Coots; Haven Gillespie	2:21
8.	"Xmas"	Shelby Lynne	5:18
9.	"Rudolph, the Red-Nosed Reindeer"	Johnny Marks	2:42
10.	"Silent Night"	Franz Gruber; Joseph Mohr	2:15
11.	"White Christmas"	Irving Berlin	2:44
Total length:			33:02

Track information and credits adapted from the album's liner notes.

== Personnel ==
=== Musicians ===
- Shelby Lynne – Acoustic guitar, electric guitar, vocals
- Michael Ward – Acoustic guitar, electric guitar
- John Jackson – Acoustic guitar, electric guitar, percussion
- Dave Koz – Alto saxophone
- Jim Honeyman – Clarinet, flute
- Gregg Field – Drums
- Marc Doten – Electric upright bass
- Val McCallum – Harmonica, acoustic guitar
- Ben Peeler – Mandolin, steel guitar, lap steel Guitar
- Dave Palmer – Piano, Wurlitzer

=== Production ===
- Shelby Lynne – Producer
- Doug Sax – Mastering
- Sangwook Nam – Mastering
- Al Schmitt – Mixing
- Steve Genewick – Mixing assistant
- Elizabeth Jordan – Executive producer
- Brian Harrison – Engineer
- Chuck Kavooras – Engineer
- Franklin Moorer – Cover photos
- Victory Tischler-Blue – Art direction, design, photography
- Terry Doty – Coordination

== Charts ==
Chart (2010)	Peak position
US Americana/Folk Albums (Billboard)	9
US Top Holiday Albums (Billboard)	31
