= Restless (Shelby Lynne album) =

Studio album by Shelby Lynne
- Released: July 18, 1995
- Recorded: 1995
- Studio: Creative Recording (Berry Hill, Tennessee); Moraine (Nashville, Tennessee)
- Genre: Country
- Length: 31:25
- Label: Magnatone/Curb
- Producer: Brent Maher

Shelby Lynne chronology
Temptation (1993)	Restless (1995)	I Am Shelby Lynne (1999)

Restless is the fifth studio album by Shelby Lynne, released on July 18, 1995, on Magnatone Records, and later re-released on Curb Records. Lynne co-wrote six of the songs on the album. The album is considered the last in a series of efforts for Lynne to attract mainstream country music audiences, this time incorporating elements of western swing. Lynne did not record another album with a Nashville-based record label until more than a decade later, when she signed with Lost Highway Records.

== Reception ==
Professional ratings
Review scores
Source	Rating
AllMusic	3/5 stars

Writing for AllMusic, Thom Jurek praised several tracks including "Slow Me Down", "Restless", "Reach for the Rhythm" and "Swingtown" and overall, he described the album as a "slab of swinging-for-the-charts commercial country."

== Track listing ==
1. "Slow Me Down" (Stephanie Davis, Shelby Lynne, Brent Maher) – 3:14
2. "Another Chance at Love" (Maher, Allen Shamblin) – 2:25
3. "Talkin' to Myself Again" (Jamie O'Hara) – 3:18
4. "Restless" (Lynne, Maher, O'Hara) – 3:05
5. "Just for the Touch of Your Hand" (Lynne, Maher, O'Hara) – 3:56
6. "Hey Now Little Darling" (Lynne, Maher, O'Hara) – 3:02
7. "I'm Not the One" (Kent Blazy, Craig Wiseman) – 3:52
8. "Reach for the Rhythm" (Lynne, Maher, O'Hara) – 2:20
9. "Wish I Knew" (Rod McGaha) – 3:44
10. "Swingtown" (Lynne, Maher, O'Hara) – 2:34

== Personnel ==
- Pat Bergeson - harmonica (tracks 5 and 6), electric guitar (tracks 3, 5, 6, 7, 8, and 10), acoustic guitar (tracks 1 and 9)
- J. D. Blair - drums (track 10)
- Paul Franklin - steel guitar (track 9)
- Randy Howard - fiddle (tracks 1, 2, 3, 4, 7, 8, and 10)
- John Hughey - steel guitar (track 3 and 7)
- Roy Huskey Jr. - bass (tracks 2, 4, and 10)
- Paul Leim - percussion (track 1), drums (tracks 1–9)
- Brent Mason - electric guitar (tracks 2 and 4)
- Weldon Myrick - steel guitar (tracks 2, 4, 6, and 8)
- The Nashville String Machine - strings
- Bobby Ogdin - piano
- Don Potter - acoustic guitar (tracks 2, 3, 4, 6, 7, 8, and 10)
- Michael Rhodes - bass (tracks 1, 5, 6, 8, and 9)
- Glenn Worf - bass (tracks 3 and 7)
- Mike Zikovich - accordion

== Chart performance ==
Chart (1995)	Peak position
U.S. Billboard Top Country Albums	72
