= Suit Yourself =

Studio album by Shelby Lynne
- Released: May 24, 2005
- Studio: Sherry Lane Studios, Rancho Mirage, CA; The Rendering Plant, Nashville, TN.
- Genre: Country
- Length: 44:41
- Label: Capitol Records
- Producer: Shelby Lynne

Shelby Lynne chronology
Identity Crisis (2003)	Suit Yourself (2005)	Just a Little Lovin' (2008)

Suit Yourself is the ninth studio album by Shelby Lynne, released on May 24, 2005. The album is the second consecutive self-produced album for Lynne, and one of two recorded for release by Capitol Records. (The album's follow-up, Just a Little Lovin', was also recorded at Capitol, but would be distributed elsewhere due to the label's corporate restructuring.) The album received mainly positive reviews from critics with an average Metacritic rating of 76/100.

Lynne wrote music and lyrics for ten of the album's songs, including "Johnny Met June", a tribute to the relationship of Johnny Cash and June Carter Cash which was written on the day of Johnny Cash's death. Though the album does not explicitly state the title of its final track, "Track 12" is a cover of "Rainy Night in Georgia" written by Tony Joe White, who also composed the album's fifth song, "Old Times Sake."

In 2016, "Johnny Met June" was featured in a PSA for Sandy Hook Promise. As a result, the song entered #20 in Billboard's Country Streaming Songs.

== Critical reception ==
Professional ratings
Aggregate scores
Source	Rating
Metacritic	76/100
Review scores
Source	Rating
AllMusic	4.5/5 stars
Robert Christgau	(3-star Honorable Mention)
Music Box	3.5/5 stars
Rolling Stone	3/5 stars

Thom Jurek of AllMusic concludes a lengthy review with, "Suit Yourself is aptly named, Lynne dressed herself this time out with great players and finely wrought songs, and put it all together on her own. This is her finest moment yet."

Jason Schneider of Exclaim reviews this album and says, "This has always been how Lynne's sultry voice sounds best, and the intimacy she captures throughout the album is heart-melting at times."

T.J. Simon of The Music Box gives the album 3½ out of a possible 5 stars and concludes with, "Another impressive element of Suit Yourself is that Lynne produced the effort herself, and the mix is perfect. On future releases, Lynne would be wise to distance herself further from standard country fare and instead emphasize her soulful side, but in the meantime, there’s a lot to enjoy on Suit Yourself.

== Track listing ==
All tracks are written by Shelby Lynne, unless otherwise noted.

No.	Title	Writer(s)	Length
1.	"Go with It"		2:57
2.	"Where Am I Now"		3:41
3.	"I Cry Everyday"		4:18
4.	"You're the Man"		3:19
5.	"Old Times Sake"	Shelby Lynne; Tony Joe White	4:50
6.	"I Won't Die Alone"		2:41
7.	"You and Me"		0:59
8.	"Johnny Met June"		3:03
9.	"You Don't Have a Heart"		5:05
10.	"Iced Tea"		2:42
11.	"Sleep"		3:28
12.	"Rainy Night in Georgia" (untitled track)	Tony Joe White	7:38
Total length:			44:41

== Personnel ==
=== Musicians ===
- Shelby Lynne – acoustic guitar, electric guitar, lead vocals, background vocals
- Brian Harrison – bass guitar
- Bryan Owings – drums, percussion
- Benmont Tench – keyboards
- Robby Turner – dobro, mandolin, pedal steel guitar
- Michael Ward – acoustic guitar, electric guitar
- Tony Joe White – electric guitar, harmonica

=== Production ===
- Shelby Lynne – Producer
- Elizabeth Jordan – Executive Producer
- Ron McMaster – Mastering
- Jim Marshall – Photography
- Brian Harrison – Mixer, Engineer
- Andy Borham – Mixer
- Eric Roinestad – Art Direction, Design
- Ron Laffitte – A&R
- Mary Fagot – Creative Director

Track information and credits adapted from the album's liner notes.

== Charts ==
Year	Title	Chart	Peak position
2016	"Johnny Met June"	Country Streaming Songs	20
