= Tears, Lies and Alibis =

Studio album by Shelby Lynne
- Released: April 20, 2010
- Recorded: 2009–2010
- Length: 37:31
- Label: Everso
- Producers: Brian Harrison, Shelby Lynne

Shelby Lynne chronology
Just a Little Lovin' (2008)	Tears, Lies and Alibis (2010)	Merry Christmas (2010)

Professional ratings
Review scores
Source	Rating
American Songwriter	4.5/5 stars
Allmusic	4/5 stars
Paste	8/10 stars
Slant Magazine	3/5 stars
PopMatters	5/10 stars

Tears, Lies, and Alibis is the eleventh studio album by Shelby Lynne, released on April 20, 2010, on Lynne's own newly founded record label, Everso Records.

== Critical reception ==
It received generally positive reviews, with a composite review of 72 on Metacritic. Thom Jurek of AllMusic said it was "produced with exquisite balance".

== Track listing ==
All songs written by Shelby Lynne.

No.	Title	Length
1.	"Rains Came"	2:25
2.	"Why Didn't You Call Me"	1:39
3.	"Like a Fool"	3:58
4.	"Alibi"	4:25
5.	"Something to Be Said About Airstreams"	3:53
6.	"Family Tree"	3:45
7.	"Loser Dreamer"	4:52
8.	"Old #7"	3:32
9.	"Old Dog"	5:27
10.	"Home Sweet Home"	3:32

== Personnel ==
- Brian Harrison − percussion
- John Jackson − Dobro, acoustic guitar, electric guitar, harmonica
- Dave Jacques − upright bass
- Mark Jordan − Hammond B-3 organ, piano
- Randy Leago − saxophone
- Shelby Lynne − acoustic guitar, electric guitar, lead vocals, background vocals
- David Hood − bass guitar
- Val McCallum − acoustic guitar, electric guitar
- Kenny Malone – drums, percussion
- Spooner Oldham – Fender Rhodes, Wurlitzer
- Bryan Owings – drums, percussion
- Ben Peeler – banjo, mandola, mandolin, Weissenborn
- Rick Reed – drums

== Chart performance ==
Tears, Lies and Alibis peaked at #108 on the U.S. Billboard 200.

Chart (2010)	Peak position
U.S. Billboard 200	108
U.S. Billboard Top Folk Albums	3
U.S. Billboard Top Independent Albums	16
U.S. Billboard Top Rock Albums	36
