= Turning for Home =

Studio album by Mike Reid
- Released: February 2, 1991
- Recorded: 1990
- Studio: Columbia Studios
- Genre: Country
- Length: 37:38
- Label: Columbia
- Producer: Steve Buckingham

Mike Reid chronology
Turning for Home (1991)	Twilight Town (1992)

Turning for Home, released in February 1991 by Columbia Records, is the debut album by American country music artist Mike Reid. It produced the number-one single "Walk on Faith", as well as four more singles, three of which entered the country top twenty chart. The album peaked at No. 22 on the Country Albums chart.

== Critical reception ==
Professional ratings
Review scores
Source	Rating
AllMusic	4/5 stars
Entertainment Weekly	B+

Alanna Nash reviews the album for Entertainment Weekly and writes, "Now comes his debut vocal album, Turning for Home, one of the best surprises of the new year. Reid is an all-around winner: His upbeat songs ("Walk on Faith") work as both thoughtful and intimate vignettes and as snappy radio rotation. And as a singer, he's alternately gruff and sensitive, with a gift for emotional directness."

People concludes their review with, "While the songs are articulate and smooth, especially the up-tempo "I'll Stop Loving You," they are easier to tune out than they might be. Vocal charisma is hard to define; nonetheless, there aren't many signs of it on this album."

Thom Owens wrote in his retrospective AllMusic review that, "Turning for Home is Mike Reid's most consistent release, demonstrating not only his talent for crafting a fine contemporary country song, but also his ability to deliver it. Reid had long been known for writing terrific commercial songs, but with Turning for Home, he showed that he could sing them with emotion as well as any other singer."

== Track listing ==
No.	Title	Writer(s)	Length
1.	"Walk on Faith"	Mike Reid; Allen Shamblin	3:11
2.	"Till You Were Gone"	Reid; Rory Bourke	3:01
3.	"I'll Stop Loving You"	Reid; Robert Byrne	3:22
4.	"I Got a Life"	Reid; Bourke	3:24
5.	"Turning for Home"	Reid	3:36
6.	"As Simple as That"	Reid; Shamblin	3:28
7.	"Everything to Me"	Reid; Shamblin	3:22
8.	"Constant Companion"	Reid; Kye Fleming	3:40
9.	"This Road"	Reid; Tim DuBois; Larry Stewart	3:26
10.	"Even a Strong Man"	Reid; Shamblin	3:59
11.	"Your Love Stays with Me"	Reid; Bourke	3:09
Total length:			37:38

== Personnel ==
=== Musicians ===
- Eddie Bayers — drums
- Steve Buckingham — acoustic guitar
- Larry Byrom — acoustic guitar
- Mark Casstevens — acoustic guitar
- Paddy Corcoran — Uilleann pipes
- Paul Franklin — steel guitar
- Sonny Garrish — steel guitar
- Steve Gibson — electric guitar, mandolin
- David Hungate — bass guitar
- Roy Huskey, Jr. — upright bass
- Mike Lawler — keyboards
- Albert Lee — electric guitar
- Paul Leim — drums
- Randy McCormick — piano
- Terry McMillan — percussion
- Joey Miskulin — accordion
- Phil Naish — keyboards
- Mark O'Connor — fiddle, mandolin
- Mike Reid — lead vocals, keyboards
- Tom Robb — bass guitar
- Biff Watson — acoustic guitar

=== Backing vocalists ===
- Carl Jackson
- Michael Mishaw
- Louis Dean Nunley
- John Wesley Ryles
- Scat Springs
- Harry Stinson
- Dennis Wilson
- Curtis Young

Track information and credits adapted from the album's liner notes.

== Chart performance ==
=== Weekly charts ===
Chart (1991)	Peak position
US Top Country Albums (Billboard)	22

=== Year-end charts ===
Chart (1991)	Position
US Top Country Albums (Billboard)	62

=== Singles ===
Year	Single	Chart Positions	
Year	Single	US Country	CAN Country
1990	"Walk on Faith"	1	1
1991	"Till You Were Gone"	17	8
1991	"As Simple as That"	14	11
1992	"I'll Stop Loving You"	23	11
1992	"I Got a Life"	54	81
