= Shelby Lynne (album) =

Studio album by Shelby Lynne
- Released: April 17, 2020
- Genre: Southern soul
- Length: 47:03
- Label: Everso Records, Thirty Tigers
- Producer: Shelby Lynne

Shelby Lynne chronology
Not Dark Yet (2017)	Shelby Lynne (2020)

Professional ratings
Aggregate scores
Source	Rating
Metacritic	80/100
Review scores
Source	Rating
AllMusic	4/5 stars
Uncut	4/5 stars

Shelby Lynne is the sixteenth album by American singer Shelby Lynne. It was released on April 17, 2020 by Everso Records with distribution by Thirty Tigers. Three singles were released from it: "I Got You", "Here I Am" and "Don't Even Believe in Love".

== Track listing ==
1. "Strange Things" – 3:34
2. "I Got You" – 4:24
3. "Love Is Coming" – 4:30
4. "Weather" – 4:43
5. "Revolving Broken Heart" – 4:12
6. "Off My Mind" – 4:44
7. "Don't Even Believe in Love" – 4:40
8. "My Mind's Riot" – 3:41
9. "Here I Am" – 4:07
10. "The Equation" – 6:46
11. "Lovefear" – 1:42
