= Soft Talk =

Studio album by Shelby Lynne
- Released: 1991
- Studio: Eleven Eleven Sound Studio, Quad Studio, and Sound Stage Studios, Nashville, Tennessee
- Genre: Country
- Length: 35:34
- Label: Epic
- Producer: James Stroud

Shelby Lynne chronology
Tough All Over (1990)	Soft Talk (1991)	Temptation (1993)

Soft Talk is the third studio album by American singer-songwriter Shelby Lynne. It was released in 1991 on the Epic label. Two tracks on the album, "The Very First Lasting Love" and "Stop Me" were performed with Les Taylor. The album reached No. 55 on the Billboard Country Albums chart. AllMusic's Bil Carpenter gave Soft Talk a star rating of three out of five and described it as "defiant, emotionally draining country." People considered the album "more subdued" but a "pleasing package".

== Track listing ==
1. "Don't Cross Your Heart" (Tony Haselden, Tim Mensy) — 2:55
2. "I've Learned to Live" (Dean Dillon, Frank Dycus) — 3:52
3. "Alive and Well" (Michael Garvin, Bucky Jones) — 3:21
4. "A Lighter Shade of Blue" (Max D. Barnes, Skip Ewing, Troy Seals) — 3:47
5. "It Must Be You" (Hugh Prestwood) — 3:07
6. "You Can't Break a Broken Heart" (Chuck Jones, Chris Waters) — 3:14
7. "Soft Talk" (Seals, Eddie Setser) — 3:39
8. "The Very First Lasting Love" (Paul Hollowell, Les Taylor, Lonnie Wilson) — 3:34
9. "Stop Me" (Jim Lauderdale, John Leventhal) — 3:43
10. "It Might Be Me" (C. Jones, J. D. Martin) — 4:22

== Personnel ==
Music

- Sonny Garrish – dobro, steel guitar
- Steve Gibson – electric guitar
- Chuck Jones – acoustic guitar
- Mike Lawler – organ, synthesizer
- Paul Leim – drums
- Shelby Lynne – lead vocals, background vocals
- Brent Mason – acoustic guitar
- Mickey Raphael – harmonica
- Gary W. Smith – piano, keyboards
- Les Taylor – duet vocals on "Stop Me"
- Glenn Worf – bass guitar

Production

- Milan Bogdan – digital editing
- Rodney Good – assistant engineer
- Julian King – assistant engineer
- John Kunz – mixing assistant
- Glenn Meadows – mastering
- Lynn Peterzell – engineer, mixing

Design

- Bill Johnson – art direction
- Ron Keith – photography
- Rollow Welch – design

== Chart performance ==
Chart (1991)	Peak position
U.S. Billboard Top Country Albums	55
