= Identity Crisis (Shelby Lynne album) =

Studio album by Shelby Lynne
- Released: September 16, 2003
- Genre: Country
- Length: 39:58
- Label: Capitol Nashville
- Producer: Shelby Lynne

Shelby Lynne chronology
Love, Shelby (2001)	Identity Crisis (2003)	Suit Yourself (2005)

Identity Crisis is the eighth studio album by Shelby Lynne, released in 2003. It has a blues and traditional rock sound.

== Critical reception ==
Professional ratings
Aggregate scores
Source	Rating
Metacritic	83/100
Review scores
Source	Rating
AllMusic	4/5 stars
Rolling Stone	3/5 stars

According to Metacritic, Identity Crisis holds a score of 83 out of 100, indicating "Universal acclaim".

Tom Jurek of AllMusic writes, "Identity Crisis is a deeply focused yet wildly adventurous look at American roots and popular musics as processed by Lynne, who is in top songwriting, vocal, and production shape here"

Matt Cibula of PopMatters writes, "this is exactly 40 minutes of transcendent music by someone who we always knew was one of the best singers and songwriters on the scene, but someone who we were afraid was never going to make the music she should be making. Well, she's done it, she did it, she dealt with the demons she needed to deal with, and she poured the rest into these death-defying songs"

Maud Hand reviews the album for BBC and writes, "On Identity Crisis Lynne returns to her country roots, yet she's still grappling with her musical identity. She borrows freely from soul, blues, gospel and vintage rock 'n' roll leaving me wondering if it's all too derivative." She goes on to say, "The more I listen the more Lynne's stylish yet simple close mic'd sound pleases."

== Track listing ==
All tracks are written by Shelby Lynne.

No.	Title	Length
1.	"Telephone"	3:50
2.	"10 Rocks"	2:45
3.	"If I Were Smart"	3:35
4.	"Gotta Be Better"	2:50
5.	"I Don't Think So"	3:34
6.	"I'm Alive"	3:34
7.	"I Will Stay"	2:57
8.	"Lonesome"	3:17
9.	"Evil Man"	4:32
10.	"Buttons and Beaus"	2:53
11.	"Baby"	3:43
12.	"One with the Sun"	2:28
Total length:		39:58

== Personnel ==
- Shelby Lynne - acoustic guitar, electric guitar, lead vocals, background vocals
- Larry Antonino - upright bass
- Jon Button - upright bass
- George Del Barrio - string arrangements
- Bill Payne - Fender Rhodes, Hammond organ, piano, Wurlitzer
- Kevin Ricard - percussion
- Oren Waters - background vocals
- Maxine Williard Waters - background vocals
