= I Am Shelby Lynne =

1999 studio album by Shelby Lynne

Studio album by Shelby Lynne
- Released: April 1999
- Recorded: 1999
- Genres: Rock, pop rock, blues
- Length: 36:04
- Labels: Mercury Records (UK); Island Def Jam (US)
- Producer: Bill Bottrell

Shelby Lynne chronology
Restless (1995)	I Am Shelby Lynne (1999)	Love, Shelby (2001)

Singles from I Am Shelby Lynne
- 1. "Your Lies" Released: 1999; 2. "Leavin'" Released: 1999; 3. "Gotta Get Back" Released: 2000

I Am Shelby Lynne is the sixth studio album by American singer-songwriter Shelby Lynne, released in April 1999, in the United Kingdom and on January 25, 2000, in the United States. After several years of lackluster results from recording various styles of country music in and around Nashville, Lynne co-wrote and recorded this album in Palm Springs, California, incorporating confessional lyrics with musical elements from blues and rock and roll. Lynne collaborated on this album with producer Bill Bottrell, who had previously worked with Sheryl Crow on her debut album, Tuesday Night Music Club.

The album is considered to be Lynne's breakout work, and the catalyst toward her receiving her first career Grammy Award as Best New Artist of 2000. The award came almost a decade after Lynne's debut album, 1989's Sunrise.

== Reception ==
Professional ratings
Aggregate scores
Source	Rating
Metacritic	83/100
Review scores
Source	Rating
AllMusic	4/5 stars
The Austin Chronicle	4/5 stars
Entertainment Weekly	B
The Guardian	5/5 stars
Houston Chronicle	4/5
Q	4/5 stars
Rolling Stone	3.5/5 stars
The Rolling Stone Album Guide	4/5 stars
Spin	9/10
The Village Voice	A−

Writing for AllMusic, Stephen Thomas Erlewine described the album as a sign of Lynne's reinvention of herself as a "tough and sexy singer", comparing her to Bonnie Raitt and Sheryl Crow. He praised Bill Bottrell's production of the album and said that Lynne "finally sounds comfortable in her writing and voice", and that with this album, she has "finally [found] her groove".

Rolling Stone's Parke Puterbaugh said that the album had more jazz and soul about it than country, but that it had "a genuine evocation of country". He said that the tracks "[seduce] you ... rather than bowling you over". He praised Lynne's harmonies, calling them "nothing less than righteous."

== Track listing ==
1. "Your Lies" (Bill Bottrell, Shelby Lynne) — 2:54
2. "Leavin'" (Lynne) — 3:11
3. "Life Is Bad" (Bottrell, Roger Fritz, Lynne) — 3:18
4. "Thought It Would Be Easier" (Bottrell, Lynne) — 3:55
5. "Gotta Get Back" (Bottrell, Lynne, Dorothy Overstreet) — 3:37
6. "Why Can't You Be?" (Bottrell, Lynne) — 4:19
7. "Lookin' Up" (Bottrell, Lynne) — 3:28
8. "Dreamsome" (Jay Joyce, Lynne, Overstreet) — 4:12
9. "Where I'm From" (Bottrell, Lynne) — 3:49
10. "Black Light Blue" (Bottrell, Lynne) — 3:23

== Personnel ==
Music

- Bill Bottrell – organ, bass guitar, acoustic guitar, electric guitar, harmonica, percussion, pedal steel guitar, drums, keyboards, background vocals, 12 string guitar, snare drum, clapping, stomping
- Jameson Brandt – string contractor
- Greg d'Augelli – flute, keyboards, string bass
- George Del Barrio – conductor, string arrangements
- Roger Fritz – dobro, acoustic guitar, slide guitar, slide mandolin
- Jay Joyce – organ, bass guitar, acoustic guitar, electric guitar, keyboards
- Shelby Lynne – acoustic guitar, electric guitar, lead vocals, background vocals, clapping, stomping
- Dorothy Overstreet – drums, snare drum

Production

- Bill Bottrell – producer, mixing
- Mark Cross – engineer, mixing
- Terry Doty – project administrator
- Ivy Scoff – project coordinator

Design

- Thomas Bird – art direction
- Rick Lecoat – design
- Rick Patrick – art direction
- Rankin – photography

== Charts ==
Chart performance for I Am Shelby Lynne
Chart (1999)	Peak position
German Albums (Offizielle Top 100)	25
Swiss Albums (Schweizer Hitparade)	100
UK Albums (Official Charts)	94
UK Country Albums (Official Charts)	2
US Billboard 200	165
