= Love, Shelby =

Studio album by Shelby Lynne
- Released: November 13, 2001
- Recorded: 2001
- Length: 42:13
- Label: Island
- Producer: Glen Ballard

Shelby Lynne chronology
I Am Shelby Lynne (1999)	Love, Shelby (2001)	Identity Crisis (2003)

Love, Shelby is the seventh studio album by American country artist Shelby Lynne. Released on November 13, 2001, through Island Records, the album serves as a follow-up to her critically acclaimed I Am Shelby Lynne which came out a year before in the US. Producer Glen Ballard, mostly known for producing Alanis Morissette's breakthrough album Jagged Little Pill as well as recordings by the Dave Matthews Band, worked with Lynne on the album. Shifting from what was established by its predecessor, the album brings mostly a pop rock-oriented sound, but maintains the personal lyrics from I Am. Critically, it struggled to make an impact, receiving mostly mixed to positive reviews. As of sales, the album charted very moderately, peaking at number 109 on the Billboard 200 chart.

For the second time in Lynne's career, she appears as the main songwriter, receiving credits on nine out of the ten tracks. Co-writers include Glen Ballard, Bill Payne, Sonny Landreth, Michael Landau, Matt Chamberlain and Mike Elizondo, noted for his work on Nelly Furtado's debut record Whoa, Nelly!. John Lennon also appears as a writer for his Top 20 hit "Mother", covered by Lynne for the album as well as during a special performance after the 9/11 attacks in New York City. Additionally, three extra tracks appear on the album's UK version: "Star Broker", "Close to You" and "Break Me Open", featured on a different track listing.

== Background and composition ==
After nearly thirteen years as a mostly unknown country vocalist, Shelby Lynne rose to prominence with the release of her sixth album. Following her Best New Artist win at the 43rd Grammy Awards, Lynne quickly started working on new material. Glen Ballard stepped in as the record's producer, much to the creation of a diverse and new sound. Impressed by Lynne's versatility and music style, Ballard praised her by stating: "(…) She has a tremendous stylistic range, from old-school, almost Barry White R&B, to hardcore punk, rockabilly and everything in between."

Around the same time, the album's first single Wall In Your Heart was released. Promoted by several performances, including one on David Letterman's show. The song went as high as number 22 on the Adult Contemporary chart. The album's release announcement came shortly after, arriving at stores on November 13. Mostly a pop-rock record, the album was a drastic change from the singer's previous work. Similar to her previous effort, the album saw Lynne as the record's main songwriter, being responsible for most of the lyrics. It also featured various contributions including Mike Elizondo. Elizondo was then known for his work with Canadian pop star Nelly Furtado.

== Critical reception and commercial performance ==
Professional ratings
Aggregate scores
Source	Rating
Metacritic	53/100
Review scores
Source	Rating
AllMusic	2.5/5 stars
The Austin Chronicle	2/5 stars
Blender	4/5 stars
Christgau’s Consumer Guide	(dud)
E!	C−
Entertainment Weekly	D+
Q	3/5 stars
Spin	6/10

Love, Shelby was met with "mixed or average" reviews from critics. At Metacritic, which assigns a weighted average rating out of 100 to reviews from mainstream publications, this release received an average score of 53 based on 12 reviews.

In a review with AllMusic, Zac Johnson wrote: "Love, Shelby proves Lynne can still write a hook, but much of what makes or breaks the finished results ultimately falls in the hands of her producer. This would actually be a more successful album if her previous work hadn't been so strong." Critic reviewer Jim Caligiuri of The Austin Chronicle wrote: "On Love, Shelby, Lynne wants to grow up, but in the process falls flat on her face. The edges have all been sawed off of Lynne's sound by producer and co-songwriter Glen Ballard, and she appears as a positively wimpy adult."

Commercially, the album performed slightly better than I Am Shelby Lynne but had lackluster sales. The album debuted and peaked at number 109 in the US Billboard 200, and failed to enter the UK Album Charts. Additionally, "Killin' Kind" became a single release, peaking at number 30 in the Adult Pop Songs chart. The track was included in the soundtrack for the film adaptation of Bridget Jones's Diary (which also featured "Dreamsome" from her previous album). The music video for the song was notable for being the first country music video directed by hip hop video director Hype Williams.

== Track listing ==
Love, Shelby track listing
No.	Title	Writer(s)	Length
1.	"Trust Me"	Shelby Lynne; Glen Ballard	3:44
2.	"Bend"	Lynne; Ballard	4:05
3.	"Jesus on a Greyhound"	Lynne; Ballard	5:05
4.	"Wall in Your Heart"	Lynne; Ballard	3:57
5.	"Ain't It the Truth"	Lynne; Ballard; Matt Chamberlain; Mike Elizondo; Michael Landau; Sonny Landreth; Bill Payne	4:19
6.	"I Can't Wait"	Lynne; Ballard	3:36
7.	"Tarpoleon Napoleon"	Lynne	4:40
8.	"Killin' Kind"	Lynne	4:27
9.	"All of a Sudden You Disappeared"	Lynne	3:39
10.	"Mother"	John Lennon	5:03

== Personnel ==
- Glen Ballard – acoustic guitar, electric guitar, synthesizer
- Carmen Carter – saxophone, background vocals
- Matt Chamberlain – drums
- Mike Elizondo – bass guitar
- Gary Grant – trumpet
- Jerry Hey – conductor, horn arrangements
- Dan Higgins – trombone
- Brian Kilgore – percussion
- Michael Landau – electric guitar
- Sonny Landreth – slide guitar
- Shelby Lynne – acoustic guitar, lead vocals, background vocals
- Bill Payne – Hammond organ, Wurlitzer
- Bill Reichenbach Jr. – trumpet
- Patrick Warren – Chamberlin, synthesizer strings
- Julia Waters – saxophone, background vocals
- Maxine Williard Waters – saxophone, background vocals

== Singles ==
- "Wall in Your Heart" – Release date: January 15, 2002
- "Killin' Kind"

== Charts ==
Chart performance for Love, Shelby
Chart (2001)	Peak position
US Billboard 200	109
