= Revelation Road =

Studio album by Shelby Lynne
- Released: October 18, 2011
- Genre: Country, folk
- Length: 38:40
- Label: Everso, Fontana
- Producer: Shelby Lynne

Shelby Lynne chronology
Merry Christmas (2010)	Revelation Road (2011)	I Can't Imagine (2015)

Professional ratings
Aggregate scores
Source	Rating
AnyDecentMusic?	7.3/10
Metacritic	78/100
Review scores
Source	Rating
American Songwriter	4/5 stars
Allmusic	3.5/5 stars

Revelation Road is the twelfth studio album by Shelby Lynne, released on October 18, 2011. On November 18, 2012, Lynne released a deluxe edition that included bonus tracks and a live DVD.

== Track listing ==
All songs written by Shelby Lynne, all vocals by Shelby Lynne, all instruments played by Shelby Lynne.

No.	Title	Length
1.	"Revelation Road"	3:44
2.	"I'll Hold Your Head"	4:30
3.	"Even Angels"	2:45
4.	"Lead Me Love"	3:13
5.	"The Thief"	3:02
6.	"Woebegone"	4:21
7.	"I Want to Go Back"	3:16
8.	"I Don't Need a Reason to Cry"	3:43
9.	"Toss It All Aside"	3:48
10.	"Heaven's Only Days Down the Road"	3:44
11.	"I Won't Leave You"	2:41

== Chart performance ==
Chart (2011)	Peak position
U.S. Billboard 200	169
U.S. Billboard Top Folk Albums	6
U.S. Billboard Top Independent Albums	28
U.S. Billboard Top Rock Albums	42
