= Mike Reid (singer) =

American country music artist (born 1947)

- Born: May 24, 1947 (age 79); Altoona, Pennsylvania, U.S.
- Musical career
- Also known as: Mike Reid
- Born: Michael Barry Reid
- Origin: Nashville, Tennessee, U.S.
- Genres: Country music, rock, musical theatre
- Occupations: Songwriter, musical theatre composer, musician
- Instrument: Vocals
- Years active: 1960s–present
- Label: Columbia
- Football career

No. 74
- Position: Defensive tackle

Personal information
- Listed height: 6 ft 3 in (1.91 m)
- Listed weight: 255 lb (116 kg)

Career information
- High school: Altoona Area
- College: Penn State (1966, 1968–1969)
- NFL draft: 1970: 1st round, 7th overall pick

Career history
- Cincinnati Bengals (1970–1974)

Awards and highlights
- First-team All-Pro (1972); Second-team All-Pro (1973); 2× Pro Bowl (1972, 1973); Cincinnati Bengals 40th Anniversary Team; Cincinnati Bengals 50th Anniversary Team; Maxwell Award (1969); Outland Trophy (1969); Unanimous All-America (1969); Second-team All-America (1968)

Career NFL statistics
- Sacks: 49
- Fumble recoveries: 2
- Stats at Pro Football Reference
- College Football Hall of Fame

Michael Barry Reid (born May 24, 1947) is an American country music artist, composer, and former professional football player. He played as a defensive tackle for five seasons with the Cincinnati Bengals in the National Football League (NFL).

Born and raised in Altoona, Pennsylvania, Reid attended and graduated from Pennsylvania State University, where he played college football for the Penn State Nittany Lions. Selected by the Bengals in the first round of the 1970 NFL draft with the seventh overall pick, he earned trips to the Pro Bowl after the 1972 and 1973 seasons, before retiring after the 1974 season. He subsequently focused on his musical career, co-writing several hit singles for country music artists, including Ronnie Milsap's "Stranger in My House", which won a Grammy Award for Best Country Song in 1984. Reid later began a solo recording career, releasing two studio albums for Columbia Records. He charted seven singles on the Billboard Hot Country Singles & Tracks (now Hot Country Songs) chart as a singer, including the number one hit "Walk on Faith".

== Football career ==
At college, Reid was a captain on both the Nittany Lions undefeated 1968 and 1969 teams that went 22–0. In his senior year (1969), the tackle spearheaded Penn State on defense with 89 tackles and was a unanimous All-America choice and All-East selection. He won the Outland Trophy as the best College football interior lineman in 1969, and also was awarded the 1969 Maxwell Award and finished fifth in the Heisman Trophy balloting. Reid also wrestled at Penn State and in 1967 he won the Eastern heavyweight wrestling title. In addition to athletics, Reid played Chicago gangster Big Julie in Penn State's production of the musical Guys and Dolls.

Reid was the first-round selection (#7 pick overall) of the Cincinnati Bengals in the 1970 NFL draft. In the team's third season, it won the AFC Central Division and made the playoffs. In 1971, Reid established himself as one of the NFL's best pass rushers by recording 12 sacks, a figure he repeated in 1972. In 1971 Reid was a consensus All-AFC selection and the following year he was consensus All-Pro as well as being voted consensus All-AFC again.

In 1973, he topped those marks by recording 13 sacks. He was named All-Pro by the Newspaper Enterprise Association (NEA) and was second-team All-Pro according to the Associated Press and Pro Football Writers Association. For the third consecutive season Reid was consensus All-AFC.

In 1974, due primarily to injuries, he recorded only seven sacks, bringing his career total to 49. In his final season, Reid was again an All-AFC selection by Pro Football Weekly. Although sacks were an unofficial statistic, the Bengals kept track of them and Reid retired as the leading sacker in the team's short history.

He made two trips to the Pro Bowl (1972 and 1973) before his retirement following the 1974 season due to knee and hand injuries and his desire to focus on a music career. In 1996, he received the NFL Alumni Career Achievement Award for his success in his post-NFL career.

He was elected to the College Football Hall of Fame in 1987 and received the Walter Camp "Alumnus of the Year" award in 1987. In 1995, he received the NCAA Silver Anniversary Award. Reid was named as part of the Bengals' 40th Anniversary All-Time team in 2007. In 2017, Reid was named as part of the Bengals' 50th Anniversary All-Time Team.

== Music career ==
After receiving his BA in music from Pennsylvania State University in 1969, Reid would perform as a pianist for the Utah Symphony Orchestra, Dallas Symphony Orchestra, and Cincinnati Symphony Orchestra.

After football, Reid formed a band and began playing at a Holiday Inn across the Ohio River from Cincinnati. He abandoned the idea of performing in a band, and began playing solo at the Blind Lemon, and began to write his own songs. Living in Mount Lookout, he drove Eastern Avenue daily, and "Eastern Avenue River Railway Blues" came out of that. After a gig in Atlanta, Reid and some other musicians were jamming at Southeastern Music Hall in the early morning hours. A cassette tape of that session found its way to Jerry Jeff Walker, who, in 1978, became the first artist to record a Reid song, that being "Eastern Avenue River Railway Blues".

In 1980, Reid moved to Nashville, and quickly became an in-demand songwriter for Ronnie Milsap. Larry Gatlin also helped Reid in his songwriting career.

In 1984, Reid won a Grammy Award for Best Country Song with the Ronnie Milsap hit "Stranger in My House". Reid also contributed compositions to artists such as Marie Osmond, Tanya Tucker, Collin Raye, Alabama, and Conway Twitty. In the 1980s and 1990s, Reid wrote 12 No. 1 singles including "Forever's as Far as I'll Go", which was recorded in 1990 by Alabama; their 29th number one country hit. He was also featured as a guest vocalist on Milsap's "Old Folks", a No. 2 hit from early 1988. He also co-wrote, with Allen Shamblin, Bonnie Raitt's hit "I Can't Make You Love Me", which reached #18 on the Billboard Pop Charts and has been covered by countless artists.

In 1990, Reid signed to Columbia Records as a recording artist. His debut album Turning for Home produced a No. 1 country hit in its lead-off single "Walk on Faith", although the album's other singles were not as successful. His second album, 1992's Twilight Town, produced two singles which both missed the Top 40.

A third album, New Direction Home, was released two decades later in 2012 by the small Off Row Records label and is available on iTunes and Spotify as well as in an mp3 download from Reid's website.

By 1991, Reid composed the music for the Civil War musical A House Divided. Over the following two decades, he wrote more musicals, including Quilts, Different Fields, Eye of the Blackbird, Tales of Appalachia, In This House, and The Ballad of Little Jo, a 1997 winner of the Academy of Arts and Letters' 'Richard Rodgers Award for Musical Theater'.

In 2019, he again returned to the musical theater stage with The Last Day, a commissioned production co-written with NYU Tisch School of Performing Arts Assistant Dean, Sarah Schlesinger, for Reid's alma mater, Penn State.

Reid was inducted into the Nashville Songwriters Hall of Fame in 2005.

Reid has written songs for other artists, including country musician Trey Taylor (singer).

== Discography ==
=== Studio albums ===
Title	Album details	Peak positions
Title	Album details	US Country
Turning for Home	Release date: February 2, 1991; Label: Columbia Records	22
Twilight Town	Release date: September 29, 1992; Label: Columbia Records	59
New Direction Home	Release date: February 6, 2012; Label: Off Row Records	—

=== Singles ===
Year	Single	Peak positions		Album
Year	Single	US Country	CAN Country	Album
1988	"Old Folks" (with Ronnie Milsap)	2	12	Heart & Soul
1990	"Walk on Faith"	1	1	Turning for Home
1991	"Till You Were Gone"	17	8	Turning for Home
1991	"As Simple as That"	14	11	Turning for Home
1991	"I'll Stop Loving You"	23	11	Turning for Home
1992	"I Got a Life"	54	81	Turning for Home
1992	"Keep On Walkin'"	45	52	Twilight Town
1992	"Call Home"	43	42	Twilight Town

=== Songwriting ===
For the most notable recordings of songs written by Mike Reid, see Category:Songs written by Mike Reid (singer).

=== Music videos ===
Year	Video	Director
1991	"Walk on Faith"	Deaton-Flanigen Productions
1992	"I'll Stop Loving You"	Deaton-Flanigen Productions
1992	"Keep On Walkin'"	Phil Tuckett
1993	"Call Home"	Deaton-Flanigen Productions
