= Shelby Lynne =

American singer-songwriter (born 1968)

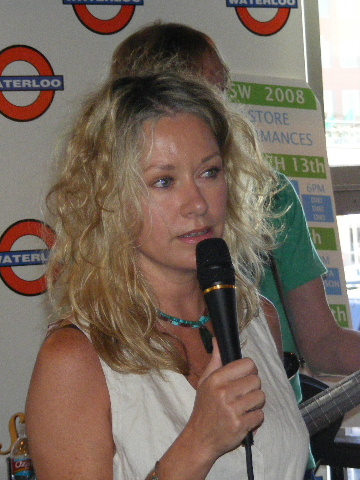

Background information
- Born: Shelby Lynn Moorer; October 22, 1968 (age 58); Quantico, Virginia, U.S.
- Genres: Americana; pop rock; country; rock
- Occupations: Singer; songwriter
- Instruments: Vocals; guitar
- Years active: 1988–present
- Labels: Epic; Morgan Creek; Mercury; Magnatone; Curb; Island; Capitol; Lost Highway; Everso

Shelby Lynn Moorer (born October 22, 1968), known professionally as Shelby Lynne, is an American singer and songwriter and the older sister of singer-songwriter Allison Moorer. The success of her pop rock album I Am Shelby Lynne (1999) led to her winning the Grammy Award for Best New Artist, despite it being her sixth studio album. She released a Dusty Springfield tribute album called Just a Little Lovin' in 2008. Since then she has started her own independent record label, called Everso Records, and released six albums: Tears, Lies and Alibis; Merry Christmas; Revelation Road; Thanks; I Can't Imagine; and Shelby Lynne. Lynne is also known for her distinctive contralto voice.

== Early life ==
Shelby Lynne was born in Quantico, Virginia, and raised in Jackson, Alabama, then Mobile, where she attended Theodore High School. Music was an important part of the Moorer family. Her father was a local bandleader and her mother a harmony-singing teacher; as children, she and her younger sister Allison — later a country recording artist in her own right — sometimes joined their parents on-stage to sing along. However, Lynne's father was a violent alcoholic who abused his wife. In 1985, her mother fled with the two girls to Mobile. Her father soon discovered their whereabouts. In 1986, when Lynne was 17 and her sister was 14, he fatally shot their mother in the family's driveway. He then turned the gun on himself while their daughters were in the house.

== Career ==
=== Early years ===
Lynne appeared on TNN's country music show Nashville Now in 1987. She soon landed a recording contract with Epic Records. Her first recording for Epic was a duet with George Jones, "If I Could Bottle This Up", which became a top-50 hit in 1988. Epic teamed Lynne with producer Billy Sherrill for her 1989 debut album Sunrise. The follow-up, 1990's Tough All Over, took more of a mainstream country direction, and 1991's Soft Talk found Lynne moving into slick country pop.

Lynne placed several songs on the country charts during this period, but none managed to break into the top 20. Critics generally regarded her as a promising talent, and she won the Academy of Country Music Award for Top New Female Vocalist in 1991, beating the other two nominees Carlene Carter and Matraca Berg.

However, she was tiring of the lack of control she was afforded over her image and musical direction. She split from Epic and signed with the smaller Morgan Creek label, debuting with 1993's Temptation, an exercise in Bob Wills-style Western swing and big band jazz. The label folded not long after, and she moved on to Magnatone for 1995's Restless, which marked a return to contemporary-style country. Afterward, Lynne disappeared from recording for several years. One notable project that she assisted on was Vince Gill's 1996 High Lonesome Sound album, where she provided background, harmony vocals on the song "You And You Alone". Vince Gill and Shelby Lynne performed the song at the 1997 CMA awards show.

=== Breakthrough ===
In 1998, Lynne moved to Palm Springs, California. For her next record, she worked with producer and songwriter Bill Bottrell. The result was the confessional and eclectic pop rock and blues-influenced album I Am Shelby Lynne. "That album came from the most vulnerable, desperate place," she recalled years later. "I think about it every day." Island Def Jam released the album in the U.K. during the fall of 1999 and then in the U.S. the following year, to wide critical acclaim. At the 43rd Grammy Awards, held on February 21, 2001, she won the award for Best New Artist. "Thirteen years and six albums to get here," said Lynne during her acceptance speech. One of the songs, "Dreamsome", also appeared on the soundtrack of the film Bridget Jones's Diary.

Her 2001 follow-up album Love, Shelby was produced by Glen Ballard and featured a slicker, more pop-influenced sound. The album received mixed reviews.

Lynne took a more low-key approach on her next effort. Identity Crisis was self-produced, recorded largely in her home studio and with few additional musicians. Many of the 12 tracks focused on dark themes, but there were also lighter songs such as "One With the Sun" (inspired by a conversation she had with Willie Nelson). The album found a home on Capitol Records and was released in September 2003. The critics gave her high marks; AllMusic's Thom Jurek wrote, "There is no identity crisis here, just the indelible mark of a mature, intense, always engaging artist." Suit Yourself (2005) also received praise from critics. However, neither record was commercially successful.

=== Later career ===
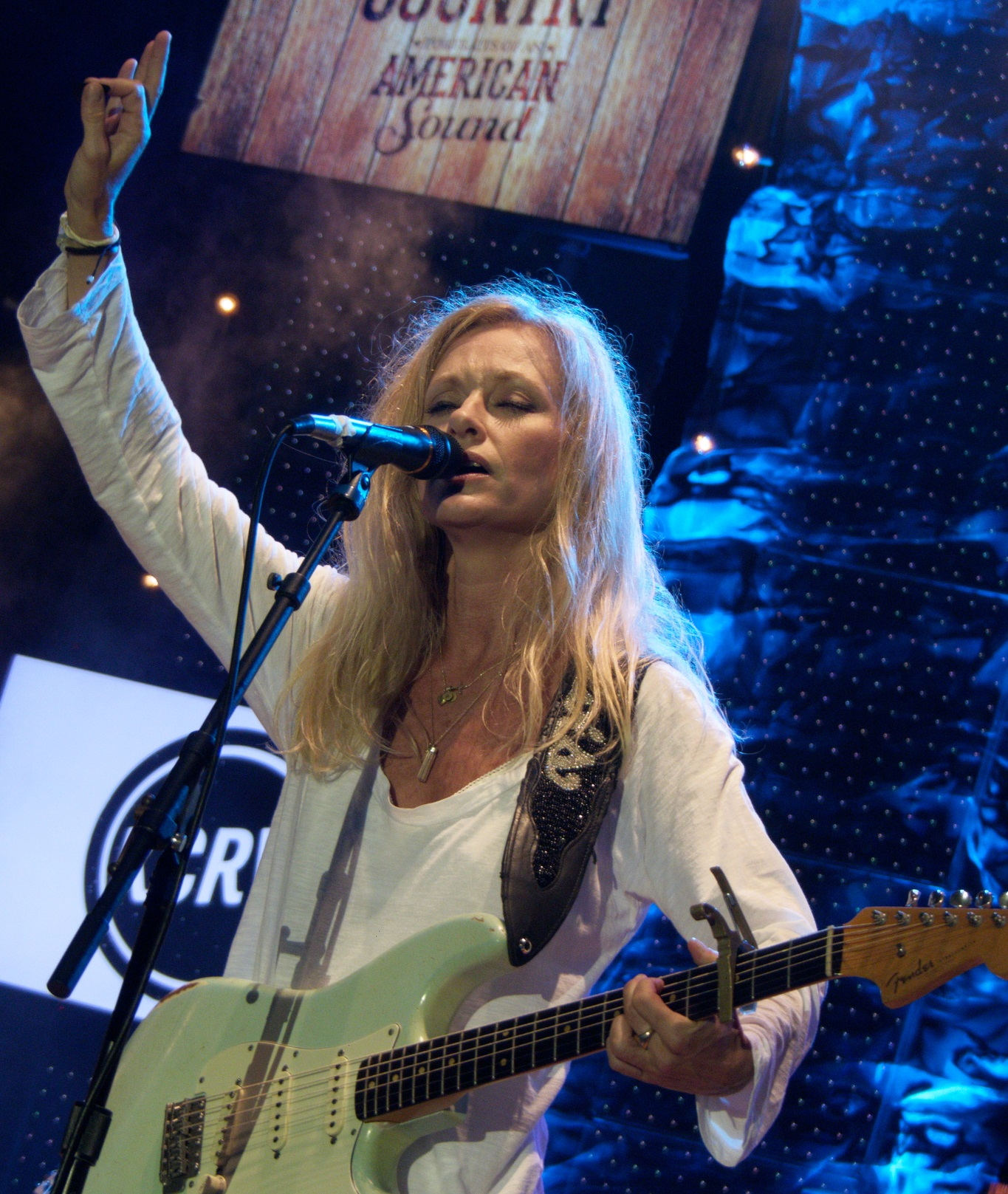
Lynne performing in 2014

Her album Just a Little Lovin', released in early 2008 by Lost Highway Records, paid tribute to the late British singer Dusty Springfield. The producer was Phil Ramone, who had worked with Springfield on "The Look of Love". Just A Little Lovin' became the highest charting album of Lynne's career, reaching number 41 on the Billboard 200. In a review for Entertainment Weekly, Marc Weingarten wrote that the album "is a stark reminder of Lynne's empathetic skill as an interpreter". The sparse production and extremely well recorded nature of the album, combined with its song selection have made this album a favorite audiophile "demo" recording, and as a result the album was reissued on audiophile-grade 200g vinyl as well as SACD.

Following a dispute with Lost Highway, Lynne started her own label, called Everso Records. "I plan on taking advantage of my freedom and working hard and putting out a lot of records," she said in an interview. The first release was her album Tears, Lies and Alibis (2010). She followed up later that year with the holiday album Merry Christmas, featuring such classics as "Christmas Time Is Here" and "O Holy Night". The third and most recent release is Revelation Road (2011), on which she played all the instruments.

On August 18, 2017, Lynne released a collaborative record with her sister Allison Moorer titled Not Dark Yet. Produced by British folk singer Teddy Thompson, it features covers of songs by Merle Haggard, Bob Dylan, Nirvana and The Killers as well as an original recording.

=== Additional projects ===
Lynne performed the John Lennon song "Mother" at Come Together: A Night for John Lennon's Words and Music in October 2001 and at Theatre Within's 30th annual Lennon tribute in November 2010.

She has worked professionally with her sister, Allison Moorer. On Moorer's live album Show, released in 2003, Lynne performed three duets with her sister. Lynne wrote "She Knows Where She Goes", one of the songs featured on Moorer's 2008 album Mockingbird. The two sisters performed five concerts together during what they called the Side by Side tour. The concerts took place from October through December 2010 in San Francisco, New York, Virginia, and Alabama.

In 2002, she sang a duet with Raul Malo on his first solo album, Today. The song is titled "Takes Two To Tango". In 2004, Lynne was featured in a duet version of alternative rock band Live's song "Run Away." This rendition can be found on the band's greatest hits compilation Awake: The Best of Live. Also in 2004, she sang a duet entitled "Can't Go Back Home", on Tony Joe White's album The Heroines. In 2007, she performed background vocals on Marc Cohn's fourth album, Join the Parade. She contributed to Forever Cool, a 2007 album from Capitol/EMI featuring contemporary artists in duets with the late Dean Martin. Alongside Big Bad Voodoo Daddy, Lynne performed a duet of one of Martin's best-known tunes, "You're Nobody 'Til Somebody Loves You".

She also joined the 9th, 10th, 11th, 12th and, in 2015, the 14th annual Independent Music Awards judging panel, to assist independent musicians' careers.

Lynne has taken on a few acting roles. "She expressed interest about working in film back in the January 1992 issue of Modern Screen's Country Music when we spoke for a story I teased on the cover ('Shelby Lynne: Is Hollywood Beckoning?') after her appearance in Willie Nelson's Another Pair of Aces TV-movie with Kris Kristofferson. 'It was hardly an acting role,' she said at the time. 'I played myself. I didn't even have any dialogue. Willie's a crook gone good. Kris is the sheriff and I'm a saloon singer. I sang two songs. One they played while Kris was makin' love. So, so much for my big acting career!'" She portrayed Johnny Cash's mother Carrie in the 2005 film Walk the Line. She appeared in a 2009 episode of the Lifetime drama series Army Wives as a country singer trying to reunite with her son. She played herself in an episode of the Starz comedy series Head Case.

She was featured in Live From Daryl's House with Daryl Hall in a "delta blues-meets-Philly soul" throwdown. The show aired on Viacom's Palladia music channel on December 15, 2012.

== Personal life ==
Lynne has never married and has no children. Although she has publicly disclosed that she is gay, Lynne has stated she intends to keep her life private outside of music.

== Filmography ==
1991	Another Pair of Aces-Three of a Kind	Saloon Singer	First Movie Role
1991	Hee Haw	Herself	1 episode
2005	Walk the Line	Carrie Cash	
2007	Head Case	Herself	1 episode
2009	Army Wives	Stella Raye	1 episode

== Awards and nominations ==
Year	Organization	Award	Nominee/Work	Result
1990	TNN/Music City News Country Awards	Vocal Collaboration of the Year	George Jones and Shelby Lynne	Nominated
1991	Academy of Country Music Awards	Top New Female Vocalist	Shelby Lynne	Won
1996	Academy of Country Music Awards	Top Vocal Duo of the Year	Shelby Lynne and Faith Hill	Nominated
2001	Grammy Awards	Best New Artist	Shelby Lynne	Won
