= Barbara Mandrell singles discography =

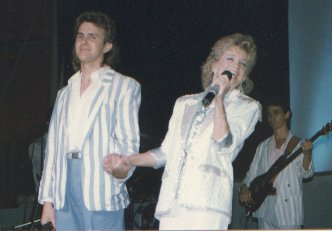
- Barbara Mandrell in 1986
- Singles: 54
- Music videos: 1
- As a collaborative artist: 7
- As a featured artist: 1
- Promotional singles: 6

The singles discography of American country music artist Barbara Mandrell contains 54 singles as a lead artists, seven singles as a collaborative artist, six promotional singles and one music video. In 1966, Mandrell's debut single was released titled "Queen for a Day". She then signed a recording contract and in 1969 had her first charting release with a cover of "I've Been Loving You Too Long (To Stop Now)". In the early 1970s, Mandrell had a series of top 20 charting singles on America's Billboard country songs chart. This included "Playin' Around with Love" (1970), "Treat Him Right" (1971) and "Show Me" (1972). She collaborated with David Houston on several singles as well. Their most successful was 1970's "After Closing Time", which became Mandrell's first top ten hit on the Billboard country chart. During this period she also reached the top ten with "Tonight My Baby's Coming Home" (1971) and "The Midnight Oil" (1973). In 1975, Mandrell signed to ABC Records and had a top five country hit with "Standing Room Only".

In 1978, Mandrell began recording for the MCA label and had her most commercially-successful singles. This included her first number one single in both the United States and Canada with "Sleeping Single in a Double Bed" the same year. She followed it with a cover of "If Loving You Is Wrong (I Don't Want to Be Right)" which also topped the country charts. It also crossed over onto the Hot 100 where it reached number 31 and number six on the adult contemporary chart. She followed it with the crossover songs "Fooled by a Feeling" and "Years". The latter release also topped the Billboard and RPM country charts. In the early 1980s, Mandrell had a series of top ten country singles including "Crackers" (1980), "Wish You Were Here" (1981), "Operator, Long Distance Please" (1982) and "In Times Like These" (1983). Her singles also reached the top of the Billboard and RPM country charts including "I Was Country When Country Wasn't Cool" (1981), "'Till You're Gone" (1982) and "One of a Kind Pair of Fools" (1983).

In 1984, Mandrell collaborated with Lee Greenwood and had several top ten country singles. Her solo recordings continued having commercial success such as "There's No Love in Tennessee" (1985) and "No One Mends a Broken Heart Like You" (1986). Mandrell switched to Capitol Records in the later part of the decade and had a top five country hit with a cover of "I Wish I Could Fall in Love Today" (1989). Her follow-up single "My Train of Thought" was her last to reach the top 20. It was followed by "Mirror, Mirror" (1989), which was her last single to chart the Billboard country survey. In the 1990s, she continued recording and releasing singles including "You've Become the Dream" and "I'll Leave Something Good Behind".

== Singles ==
=== As lead artist ===
List of singles, with selected chart positions, showing other relevant details
| Title | Year | Peak chart positions | | | | | | | Album |
| Title | Year | US | US AC | US Cou. | AUS | CAN | CAN AC | CAN Cou. | Album |
|---|---|---|---|---|---|---|---|---|---|
| "Queen for a Day" | 1966 | — | — | — | — | — | — | — | Non-album single |
| "I've Been Loving You Too Long (To Stop Now)" | 1969 | — | — | 55 | — | — | — | — | Treat Him Right |
| "Playin' Around with Love" | 1970 | — | — | 18 | — | — | — | 48 | Treat Him Right |
| "Do Right Woman, Do Right Man" | 1970 | — (Note: "Do Right Woman, Do Right Man" peaked at number 28 on the Billboard Bubbling Under Hot 100 singles chart, a list which acts as a 25-song extension of the Hot 100.) | — | 17 | — | — | — | — | Treat Him Right |
| "Treat Him Right" | 1971 | — | — | 12 | — | — | — | — | Treat Him Right |
| "Tonight My Baby's Coming Home" | 1971 | — | — | 10 | — | — | — | 34 | The Midnight Oil |
| "Show Me" | 1972 | — | — | 11 | — | — | — | 48 | The Midnight Oil |
| "Holdin' On (To the Love I Got)" | 1972 | — | — | 27 | — | — | — | 38 | The Midnight Oil |
| "Give a Little, Take a Little" | 1973 | — | — | 24 | — | — | — | 29 | The Midnight Oil |
| "The Midnight Oil" | 1973 | — | — | 7 | — | — | — | 5 | The Midnight Oil |
| "This Time I Almost Made It" | 1974 | — | — | 12 | — | — | — | — | This Time I Almost Made It |
| "Wonder When My Baby's Coming Home" | 1975 | — | — | 39 | — | — | — | — | This Time I Almost Made It |
| "Standing Room Only" | 1975 | — | — | 5 | — | — | — | 37 | This Is Barbara Mandrell |
| "That's What Friends Are For" | 1976 | — | — | 16 | — | — | — | 27 | This Is Barbara Mandrell |
| "Love Is Thin Ice" | 1976 | — | — | 24 | — | — | — | — | This Is Barbara Mandrell |
| "Midnight Angel" | 1976 | — | — | 16 | — | — | — | 31 | Midnight Angel |
| "Married, But Not to Each Other" | 1977 | — | — | 3 | — | — | — | 3 | Midnight Angel |
| "Hold Me" | 1977 | — | — | 12 | — | — | — | 14 | Lovers, Friends and Strangers |
| "Woman to Woman" | 1977 | 92 | 49 | 4 | — | — | — | 5 | Love's Ups and Downs |
| "Tonight" | 1978 | — (Note: "Tonight" peaked at number 3 on the Billboard Bubbling Under Hot 100 singles chart, a list which acts as a 25-song extension of the Hot 100.) | — | 5 | — | — | — | 25 | Love's Ups and Downs |
| "Sleeping Single in a Double Bed" | 1978 | — (Note: "Sleeping Single in a Double Bed" peaked at number 2 on the Billboard Bubbling Under Hot 100 singles chart, a list which acts as a 25-song extension of the Hot 100.) | — | 1 | 85 | — | — | 1 | Moods |
| "(If Loving You Is Wrong) I Don't Want to Be Right" | 1979 | 31 | 6 | 1 | — | 25 | 31 | 1 | Moods |
| "Fooled by a Feeling" | 1979 | 89 | 26 | 4 | — | — | 3 | 5 | Just for the Record |
| "Years" | 1979 | — (Note: "Do Right Woman, Do Right Man" peaked at number 2 on the Billboard Bubbling Under Hot 100 singles chart, a list which acts as a 25-song extension of the Hot 100.) | 38 | 1 | — | — | 1 | 1 | Just for the Record |
| "Crackers" | 1980 | — (Note: "Crackers" peaked at number 5 on the Billboard Bubbling Under Hot 100 singles chart, a list which acts as a 25-song extension of the Hot 100.) | — | 3 | — | — | — | 6 | Love Is Fair |
| "The Best of Strangers" | 1980 | — | — | 6 | — | — | — | 9 | Love Is Fair |
| "Love Is Fair" (Note: Both "Love Is Fair" and "Sometime, Somewhere, Somehow" were released as double A-side singles.) | 1981 | — | — | 13 | — | — | — | 7 | Love Is Fair |
| "Sometime, Somewhere, Somehow" (Note: Both "Love Is Fair" and "Sometime, Somewhere, Somehow" were released as double A-side singles.) | 1981 | — | 26 | 13 | — | — | — | — | Love Is Fair |
| "I Was Country When Country Wasn't Cool" | 1981 | — | — | 1 | — | — | — | 14 | Barbara Mandrell Live |
| "Wish You Were Here" | 1981 | — | 40 | 2 | — | — | — | 11 | Barbara Mandrell Live |
| "Till You're Gone" | 1982 | — | 25 | 1 | — | — | 20 | 3 | ...In Black & White |
| "Operator, Long Distance Please" | 1982 | — | — | 9 | — | — | — | 9 | ...In Black & White |
| "In Times Like These" | 1983 | — | — | 4 | — | — | — | 9 | Spun Gold |
| "One of a Kind Pair of Fools" | 1983 | — | — | 1 | — | — | — | 1 | Spun Gold |
| "Happy Birthday Dear Heartache" | 1984 | — | — | 3 | — | — | — | 18 | Clean Cut |
| "Only a Lonely Heart Knows" | 1984 | — | — | 2 | — | — | — | 1 | Clean Cut |
| "Crossword Puzzle" | 1984 | — | — | 11 | — | — | — | 10 | Clean Cut |
| "There's No Love in Tennessee" | 1985 | — | — | 7 | — | — | — | 24 | Greatest Hits |
| "Angel in Your Arms" | 1985 | — | — | 8 | — | — | — | 22 | Get to the Heart |
| "Fast Lanes and Country Roads" | 1985 | — | — | 4 | — | — | — | 2 | Get to the Heart |
| "When You Get to the Heart" (with The Oak Ridge Boys) | 1986 | — | — | 20 | — | — | — | 33 | Get to the Heart |
| "No One Mends a Broken Heart Like You" | 1986 | — | — | 6 | — | — | — | 5 | Moments |
| "Sure Feels Good" | 1987 | — | — | 48 | — | — | — | 41 | Sure Feels Good |
| "Child Support" | 1987 | — | — | 13 | — | — | — | 14 | Sure Feels Good |
| "Angels Love Bad Men" | 1988 | — | — | 49 | — | — | — | 40 | Sure Feels Good |
| "I Wish That I Could Fall in Love Today" | 1988 | — | — | 5 | — | — | — | 2 | I'll Be Your Jukebox Tonight |
| "My Train of Thought" | 1989 | — | — | 19 | — | — | — | 15 | I'll Be Your Jukebox Tonight |
| "Mirror, Mirror" | 1989 | — | — | 49 | — | — | — | 56 | I'll Be Your Jukebox Tonight |
| "You Wouldn't Know Love (If It Looked You in the Eye)" | 1989 | — | — (Note: "You Wouldn't Know Love (If It Looked You in the Eye)" did not enter the Billboard Hot Country Songs chart, but peaked at number 7 on Hot Country Radio Breakouts.) | — | — | — | — | 81 | Morning Sun |
| "You've Become the Dream" | 1990 | — | — | — | — | — | — | — | Morning Sun |
| "Men and Trains" | 1990 | — | — | — | — | — | — | — | No Nonsense |
| "I'll Leave Something Good Behind" | 1991 | — | — | — | — | — | — | — | No Nonsense |
| "Feed the Fire" | 1991 | — | — | — | — | — | — | — | No Nonsense |
| "The Key's in the Mailbox" | 1991 | — | — | — | — | — | — | — | Key's in the Mailbox |
"—" denotes a recording that did not chart or was not released in that territory.

=== As a collaborative artist ===
List of singles, with selected chart positions, showing other relevant details
| Title | Year | Peak chart positions | | | Album |
| Title | Year | US AC | US Cou. | CAN Cou. | Album |
|---|---|---|---|---|---|
| "After Closing Time" (with David Houston) | 1970 | — | 6 | 4 | A Perfect Match |
| "We've Got Everything But Love" (with David Houston) | 1971 | — | 20 | — | A Perfect Match |
| "A Perfect Match" (with David Houston) | 1972 | — | 24 | — | A Perfect Match |
| "I Love You, I Love You" (with David Houston) | 1973 | — | 6 | 18 | A Perfect Match |
| "Lovin' You Is Worth It" (with David Houston) | 1974 | — | 40 | — | A Perfect Match |
| "To Me" (with Lee Greenwood) | 1984 | 24 | 3 | 5 | Meant for Each Other |
| "It Should Have Been Love by Now" (with Lee Greenwood) | 1985 | 35 | 19 | 12 | Meant for Each Other |
"—" denotes a recording that did not chart or was not released in that territory.

=== As a featured artist ===
List of singles, with selected chart positions, showing other relevant details
| Title | Year | Peak chart positions | | Album |
| Title | Year | US Cou. | CAN Cou. | Album |
|---|---|---|---|---|
| "The Ten Commandments of Love" (David Houston with Barbara Mandrell) | 1974 | 14 | 9 | A Man Needs Love |

=== Promotional singles ===
List of promotional singles, showing all relevant details
| Title | Year | Album | Ref. |
|---|---|---|---|
| "I Feel the Hurt Coming On" | 1978 | Moods | |
| "Fallin' in Love Alone" | 1978 | Non-album singles | |
| "Sweet Weekend Encounter" | 1979 | Non-album singles | |
| "Fire Me" | 1980 | Non-album singles | |
| "Santa, Bring My Baby Home" | 1984 | Christmas at Our House | |
| "Sleeping Single in a Double Bed (Dave Audé Remix)" | 2020 | Non-album single | |

== Music videos ==
List of music videos, showing year released and director
| Title | Year | Director(s) | Ref. |
|---|---|---|---|
| "I'll Leave Something Good Behind" | 1991 | not available | |
