= Barbara Mandrell albums discography =

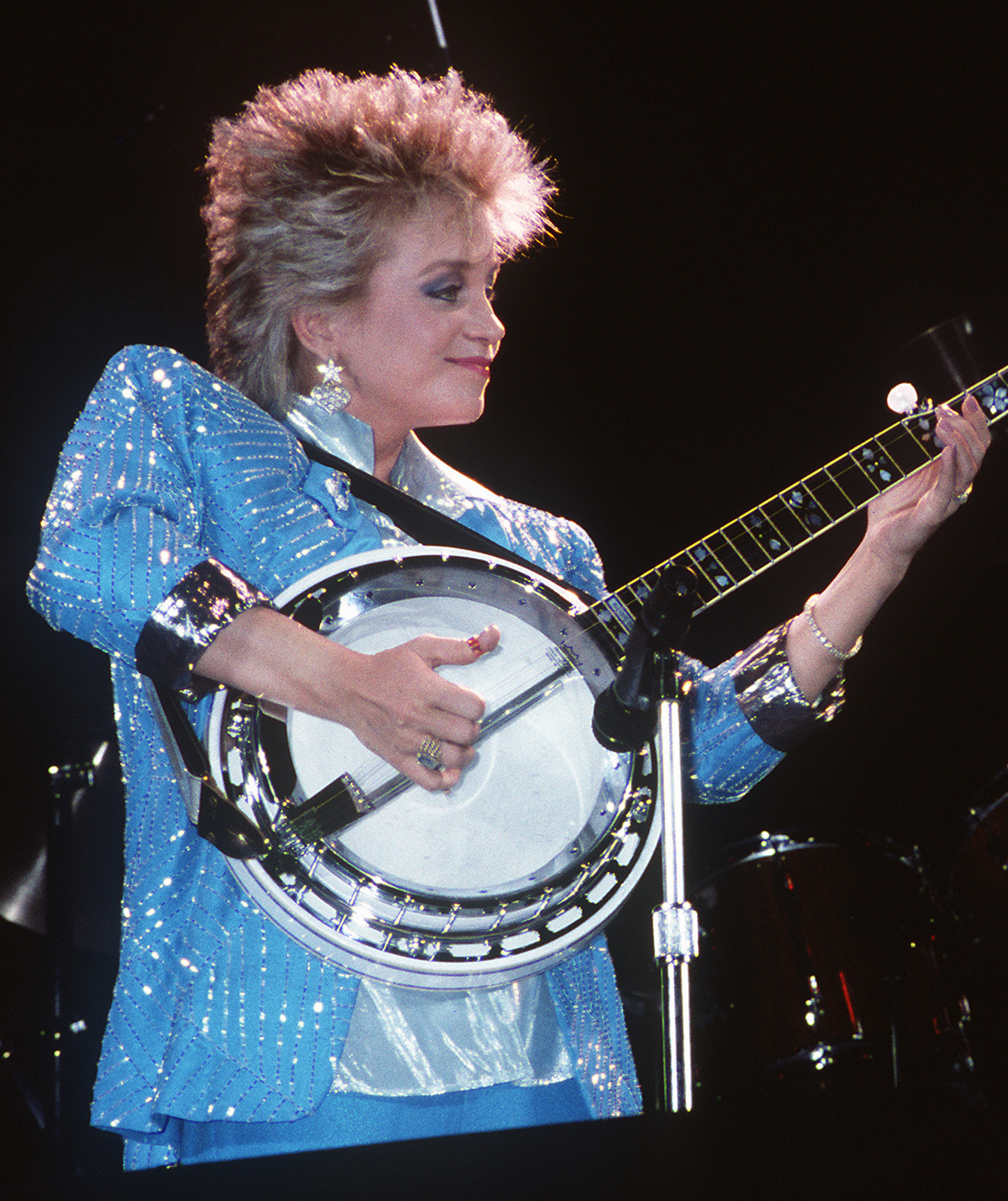
- Mandrell on stage in 1986
- Studio albums: 25
- Live albums: 1
- Compilation albums: 20
- Collaborative studio albums: 2
- Other album appearances: 6

The albums discography of American country artist Barbara Mandrell contains 25 solo studio albums, two collaborative studio albums, 20 compilation albums, one live album and six other album appearances. In 1971, Mandrell's debut studio record was released on Columbia Records titled Treat Him Right. It was her first disc to chart on America's Billboard country albums chart, reaching number 44. In 1972, she collaborated with David Houston on the album A Perfect Match. Mandrell's third studio album The Midnight Oil (1973) was her first to reach the top ten of the country albums chart, climbing to number six. In 1976, she moved to ABC Records and released three more studio projects that reached the top 40 of the Billboard country LP's survey.

Mandrell switched to MCA in 1978 and released Moods. It was her second top ten album on the Billboard country albums chart, climbing to number eight. It was also her first disc to chart on the Billboard 200 and the top five of Canada's RPM country albums chart. Her next several studio albums also reached the top ten of the American and Canadian country charts including Just for the Record (1979), Love Is Fair (1980), ...In Black & White (1982), Spun Gold (1983), Clean Cut (1984) and a collaboration with Lee Greenwood. In 1981, MCA released Mandrell's first live project which was certified gold in sales by the Recording Industry Association of America. During this period her compilation The Best of Barbara Mandrell also certified gold from the RIAA.

In 1987, Mandrell signed with Capitol Records and released Sure Feels Good the same year. It was followed in 1989 by I'll Be Your Jukebox Tonight which reached the top 40 of the Billboard country albums survey. She remained on the Capitol roster until 1991 and released three more album projects with the label. Her final disc with Capitol was 1991's Key's in the Mailbox. She moved to independent projects during the remainder of the decade. Mandrell's final album was released in 1994 titled It Works for Me.

== Studio albums ==
=== As lead artist ===
List of albums, with selected chart positions, showing other relevant details
Title	Album details	Peak chart positions		
Title	Album details	US	US Cou.	CAN Cou.
Treat Him Right	Released: September 9, 1971; Label: Columbia; Formats: LP	—	44	—
The Midnight Oil	Released: November 9, 1973; Label: Columbia; Formats: LP	—	8	—
This Time I Almost Made It	Released: August 16, 1974; Label: Columbia; Formats: LP	—	41	—
This Is Barbara Mandrell	Released: May 3, 1976; Label: ABC/Dot; Formats: LP	—	26	—
Midnight Angel	Released: October 29, 1976; Label: ABC/Dot; Formats: LP	—	24	—
Lovers, Friends and Strangers	Released: May 1, 1977; Label: ABC/Dot; Formats: LP, cassette	—	26	—
Love's Ups and Downs	Released: November 18, 1977; Label: ABC/Dot; Formats: LP, cassette	—	29	—
Moods	Released: September 29, 1978; Label: ABC/MCA; Formats: LP, cassette	132	8	3
Just for the Record	Released: August 17, 1979; Label: MCA; Formats: LP, cassette	166	9	4
Love Is Fair	Released: August 29, 1980; Label: MCA; Formats: LP, cassette	175	6	12
...In Black & White	Released: April 30, 1982; Label: MCA; Formats: LP, cassette	153	7	—
He Set My Life to Music	Released: September 6, 1982; Label: MCA; Formats: LP, cassette	—	59	—
Spun Gold	Released: July 29, 1983; Label: MCA; Formats: LP, cassette	140	5	—
Clean Cut	Released: March 27, 1984; Label: MCA; Formats: LP, cassette	204	8	—
Christmas at Our House	Released: October 29, 1984; Label: MCA; Formats: LP, cassette	—	31	—
Get to the Heart	Released: August 19, 1985; Label: MCA; Formats: LP, cassette	—	25	—
Moments	Released: August 25, 1986; Label: MCA; Formats: LP, cassette	—	53	—
Sure Feels Good	Released: July 15, 1987; Label: EMI America; Formats: LP, CD, cassette	—	24	—
I'll Be Your Jukebox Tonight	Released: September 20, 1988; Label: Capitol; Formats: LP, CD, cassette	—	35	—
Precious Memories	Released: May 1, 1989; Label: Heartland; Formats: LP, CD, cassette	—	—	—
Morning Sun	Released: March 27, 1990; Label: Capitol; Formats: LP, CD, cassette	—	—	—
No Nonsense	Released: August 21, 1990; Label: Capitol; Formats: CD, cassette	—	72	—
Key's in the Mailbox	Released: September 24, 1991; Label: Capitol; Formats: CD, cassette	—	62	—
Acoustic Attitude	Released: April 21, 1994; Label: Direct; Formats: CD	—	—	—
It Works for Me	Released: April 21, 1994; Label: Direct; Formats: CD	—	—	—
"—" denotes a recording that did not chart or was not released in that territory.

=== As a collaborative artist ===
List of albums, with selected chart positions, showing other relevant details
Title	Album details	Peak chart positions	
Title	Album details	US	US Cou.
A Perfect Match (with David Houston)	Released: August 23, 1972; Label: Epic; Formats: LP	—	38
Meant for Each Other (with Lee Greenwood)	Released: August 6, 1984; Label: MCA; Formats: LP, cassette	89	5
"—" denotes a recording that did not chart or was not released in that territory.

== Compilation albums ==
List of albums, with selected chart positions and certifications, showing other relevant details
Title	Album details	Peak chart positions			Certifications
Title	Album details	US	US Cou.	CAN Cou.	Certifications
The Best of Barbara Mandrell	Released: August 29, 1977; Label: Columbia; Formats: LP, cassette	—	37	—	
The Best of Barbara Mandrell	Released: January 29, 1979; Label: ABC/MCA; Formats: LP, cassette	170	13	9	RIAA: Gold
Looking Back	Released: July 1981; Label: Columbia; Formats: LP, cassette	—	—	—	
The Best of Barbara Mandrell	Released: 1982; Label: CBS Special Products; Formats: LP, cassette	—	—	—	
The Very Best of Barbara Mandrell	Released: 1982; Label: MCA; Formats: LP	—	—	—	
In the Name of Love	Released: 1982; Label: CBS Special Products; Formats: Cassette	—	—	—	
Country Class	Released: 1983; Label: CBS; Formats: LP	—	—	—	
Entertainer of the Year	Released: 1984; Label: CBS Special Products; Formats: Cassette	—	—	—	
Greatest Hits	Released: February 25, 1985; Label: MCA; Formats: LP, CD, cassette	210	27	—	
Greatest Country Hits	Released: September 25, 1990; Label: Curb; Formats: CD, cassette	—	—	—	
The Best of Barbara Mandrell	Released: May 5, 1992; Label: Liberty; Formats: CD, cassette	—	—	—	
The Barbara Mandrell Collection	Released: February 7, 1995; Label: Liberty; Formats: CD, cassette	—	—	—	
22 Legendary Hits	Released: 1995; Label: MCA Special Products; Formats: CD	—	—	—	
Gospel's Greatest (with Loretta Lynn)	Released: 1995; Label: MCA Special Products; Formats: CD, cassette	—	—	—	
Super Hits	Released: August 12, 1997; Label: Columbia; Formats: CD, cassette	—	—	—	
The Best of Barbara Mandrell	Released: 1999; Label: Universal; Formats: CD	—	—	—	
20th Century Masters: The Millennium Collection	Released: October 31, 2000; Label: MCA Nashville; Formats: CD	—	—	—	
Ultimate Collection	Released: July 31, 2001; Label: Hip-O Records; Formats: CD	—	—	—	
36 Greatest Hits!	Released: 2004; Label: Universal Special Markets; Formats: CD	—	—	—	
After All These Years: A Collection	Released: July 10, 2020; Label: MCA; Formats: LP, music download	—	—	—	
"—" denotes a recording that did not chart or was not released in that territory.

== Live albums ==
List of albums, with selected chart positions and certifications, showing other relevant details
Title	Album details	Peak chart positions		Certifications
Title	Album details	US	US Cou.	Certifications
Barbara Mandrell Live	Released: August 7, 1981; Label: MCA; Formats: LP, cassette	86	4	RIAA: Gold

== Other appearances ==
List of non-single guest appearances, with other performing artists, showing year released and album name
Title	Year	Other artist(s)	Album	Ref.
"My Song of Love"	1971	David Houston	Country Express	
"A Very Special Love Song"	1982	—N/a	The Nashville Connection	
"My Rose of Old Kentucky"	1984	Bill Monroe	Bill Monroe and Friends	
"I'm So Glad I'm Standing Here Today"	1984	—N/a	Sing Your Praise to the Lord: A Contemporary Christian Music Experience	
"Daisy Chain"	1984	George Jones	Ladies Choice	
"I'd Give Anything"	1991	Lee Greenwood	A Perfect 10	
