= List of awards and nominations received by Barbara Mandrell =

Barbara Mandrell awards and nominations
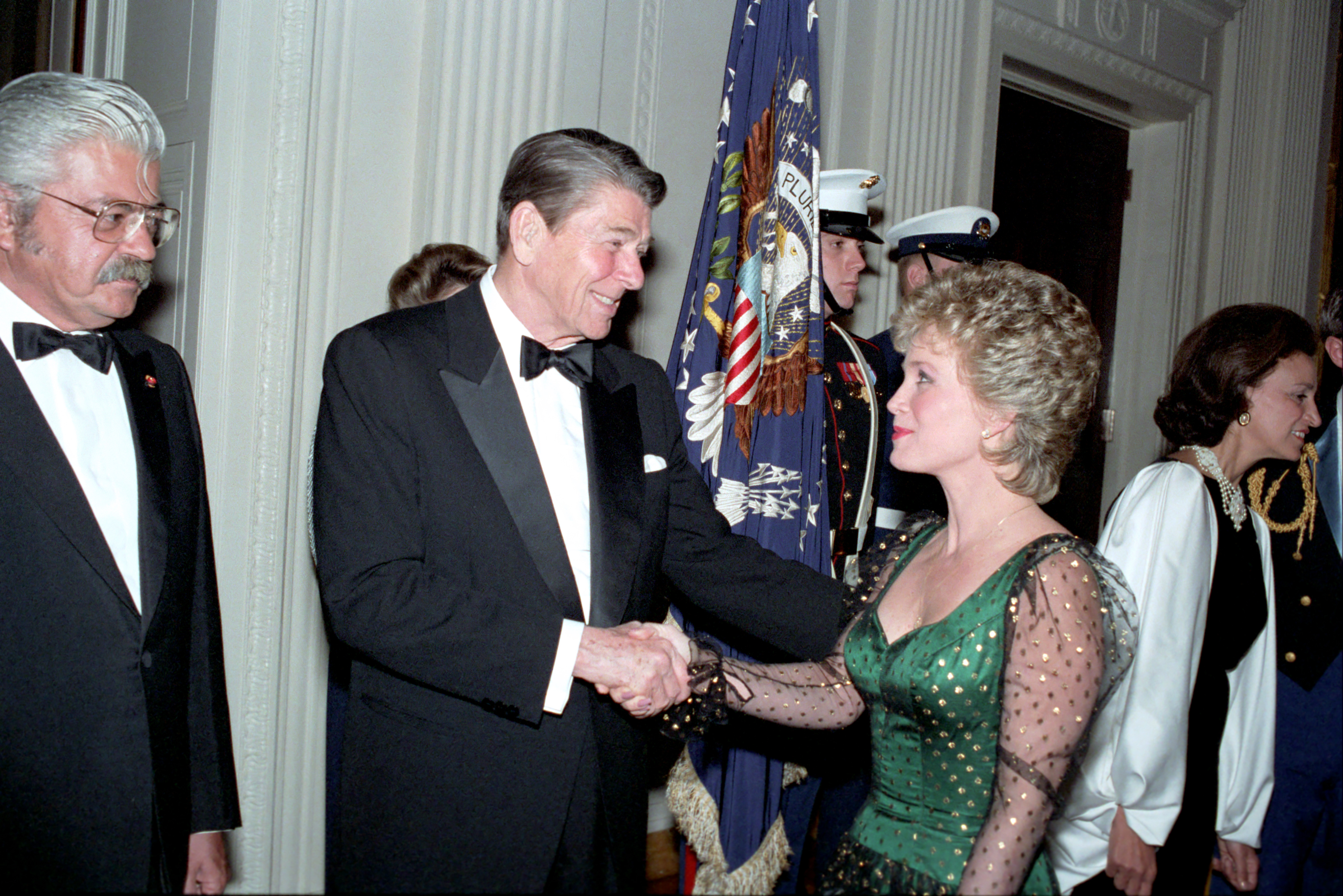
- Barbara Mandrell with President Ronald Reagan, 1986
Awards and nominations
Award	Wins	Nominations
Academy of Country Music Awards	6	9
Country Music Association Awards	4	17
Grammy Awards	2	9
People's Choice Awards	9	0

Totals (Note: Certain award groups do not simply award one winner. They acknowledge several different recipients, have runners-up, and have third place. Since this is a specific recognition and is different from losing an award, runner-up mentions are considered wins in this award tally. For simplification and to avoid errors, each award in this list has been presumed to have had a prior nomination.)
- Wins: 39+
- Nominations: 35+

American country music artist Barbara Mandrell has won over 39 awards and has been nominated for more than 35. She has received nine nominations from the Academy of Country Music and has won six accolades from the association. For winning the Top New Female Vocalist, Top Female Vocalist and Entertainer of the Year awards, Mandrell was given the Triple Crown accolade in 2005. From the Country Music Association, she has been nominated 17 times and has won four awards. This includes winning back-to-back Entertainer of the Year trophies in the early 1980s. In addition, she has also won two Grammy awards for her work in the gospel field. In the 1980s, she was given nine People's Choice Awards.

== Academy of Country Music Awards ==
Year	Nominee / work	Award	Result	Ref.
1970	Barbara Mandrell	Most Promising Female Vocalist	Won	
1978	Barbara Mandrell	Top Female Vocalist	Won	
1979	Barbara Mandrell	Top Female Vocalist	Nominated	
1980	Barbara Mandrell	Entertainer of the Year	Won	
1980	Barbara Mandrell	Top Female Vocalist	Nominated	
1981	Barbara Mandrell	Top Female Vocalist	Won	
1981	Barbara Mandrell	Entertainer of the Year	Nominated	
1981	"I Was Country When Country Wasn't Cool"	Single of the Year	Nominated	
1982	Barbara Mandrell	Entertainer of the Year	Nominated	
1982	Barbara Mandrell	Top Female Vocalist	Nominated	
1983	Barbara Mandrell	Entertainer of the Year	Nominated	
1983	Barbara Mandrell	Top Female Vocalist	Nominated	
1984	Barbara Mandrell and Lee Greenwood	Top Vocal Duet	Nominated	
2000	Barbara Mandrell	Cliffie Stone Pioneer Award	Won	
2005	Barbara Mandrell	Triple Crown	Won	

== American Music Awards ==
Year	Nominee / work	Award	Result	Ref.
1980	"Sleeping Single in a Double Bed"	Favorite Country Song	Won	
1980	Barbara Mandrell	Favorite Country Female Artist	Nominated	
1981	Barbara Mandrell	Favorite Country Female Artist	Won	
1982	Barbara Mandrell	Favorite Country Female Artist	Won	
1983	Barbara Mandrell	Favorite Country Female Artist	Won	
1984	Barbara Mandrell	Favorite Country Female Artist	Won	
1985	Barbara Mandrell	Favorite Country Female Artist	Won	
1987	Barbara Mandrell	Favorite Country Female Artist	Won	

== CMT Music Awards ==
Year	Nominee / work	Award	Result	Ref.
1976	Barbara Mandrell	Most Promising Female Artist of the Year	Won	
1979	Barbara Mandrell	Female Artist of the Year	Won	
1981	Barbara Mandrell	Comedian of the Year	Won	
1981	Barbara Mandrell	Female Artist of the Year	Won	
1981	Barbara Mandrell	Instrumentalist of the Year	Won	
1982	Barbara Mandrell	Female Artist of the Year	Won	
1982	Barbara Mandrell	Instrumentalist of the Year	Won	
1985	Barbara Mandrell	Living Legend Award	Won	
1991	Barbara Mandrell	Minnie Pearl Award	Won	

== Country Gospel Music Association Hall of Fame ==
Year	Nominee / work	Award	Result	Ref.
1998	Barbara Mandrell	Inducted	Won	

== Country Music Hall of Fame and Museum ==
Year	Nominee / work	Award	Result	Ref.
2009	Barbara Mandrel	Inducted	Won	

== Country Music Association Awards ==
Year	Nominee / work	Award	Result	Ref.
1973	David Houston and Barbara Mandrell	Vocal Duo of the Year	Nominated	
1974	David Houston and Barbara Mandrell	Vocal Duo of the Year	Nominated	
1976	Barbara Mandrell	Female Vocalist of the Year	Nominated	
1977	Barbara Mandrell	Female Vocalist of the Year	Nominated	
1978	Barbara Mandrell	Female Vocalist of the Year	Nominated	
1979	Barbara Mandrell	Female Vocalist of the Year	Won	
1979	Barbara Mandrell	Entertainer of the Year	Nominated	
1979	"(If Loving You Is Wrong) I Don't Want to Be Right"	Single of the Year	Nominated	
1980	Barbara Mandrell	Entertainer of the Year	Won	
1980	Barbara Mandrell	Female Vocalist of the Year	Nominated	
1981	Barbara Mandrell	Entertainer of the Year	Won	
1981	Barbara Mandrell	Female Vocalist of the Year	Won	
1981	"I Was Country When Country Wasn't Cool"	Single of the Year	Nominated	
1982	Barbara Mandrell	Entertainer of the Year	Nominated	
1982	Barbara Mandrell	Female Vocalist of the Year	Nominated	
1983	Barbara Mandrell	Entertainer of the Year	Nominated	
1983	Barbara Mandrell	Female Vocalist of the Year	Nominated	
1984	Barbara Mandrell	Entertainer of the Year	Nominated	
1984	Barbara Mandrell	Female Vocalist of the Year	Nominated	
1984	Barbara Mandrell and Lee Greenwood	Vocal Duo of the Year	Nominated	
1985	Barbara Mandrell and Lee Greenwood	Vocal Duo of the Year	Nominated	

== Golden Globe Awards ==
Year	Nominee / work	Award	Result	Ref.
1981	Barbara Mandrell & the Mandrell Sisters	Best Actress in a Television Series – Musical or Comedy	Nominated	

== Grammy Awards ==
Year	Nominee / work	Award	Result	Ref.
1978	"After the Lovin'"	Best Country Vocal Performance, Female	Nominated	
1979	"Sleeping Single in a Double Bed"	Best Country Vocal Performance, Female	Nominated	
1980	Just for the Record	Best Country Vocal Performance, Female	Nominated	
1981	"The Best of Strangers"	Best Country Vocal Performance, Female	Nominated	
1982	"I Was Country When Country Wasn't Cool"	Best Country Vocal Performance, Female	Nominated	
1982	"Instrumental Medley: Mountain Dew / Fireball Mail / Old Joe Clark / Night Train / Uncle Joe's Boogie"	Best Country Instrumental Performance	Nominated	
1982	"In My Heart"	Best Inspirational Performance	Nominated	
1983	He Set My Life to Music	Best Inspirational Performance	Won	
1984	"I'm So Glad I'm Standing Here Today" (with Bobby Jones)	Best Soul Gospel Performance by a Duo or Group	Won	
1985	"To Me" (with Lee Greenwood)	Best Country Performance by a Duo or Group with Vocal	Nominated	
1986	Christmas at Our House	Best Inspirational Performance	Nominated	

== Music City Walk of Fame ==
Year	Nominee / work	Award	Result	Ref.
2007	Barbara Mandrell	Star on Walk of Fame	Won	

== Musicians Hall of Fame and Museum ==
Year	Nominee / work	Award	Result	Ref.
2014	Barbara Mandrell	Inducted	Won	

== People's Choice Awards ==
Year	Nominee / work	Award	Result	Ref.
1982	Barbara Mandrell	Favorite All-Around Female Entertainer	Won	
1982	Barbara Mandrell	Favorite Female Musical Performer	Won	
1982	Barbara Mandrell	Favorite Female TV Performer	Won	
1983	Barbara Mandrell	Favorite All-Around Female Entertainer	Won	
1984	Barbara Mandrell	Favorite All-Around Female Entertainer	Won	
1985	Barbara Mandrell	Favorite All-Around Female Entertainer	Won	
1985	Barbara Mandrell	Favorite Female Musical Performer	Won	
1986	Barbara Mandrell	Favorite All-Around Female Entertainer	Won	
1987	Barbara Mandrell	Favorite All-Around Female Entertainer	Won	

== Southern Gospel Music Association ==
Year	Nominee / work	Award	Result	Ref.
2009	Barbara Mandrell	James D. Vaughn Impact Award	Won	

== Women of the World ==
Year	Nominee / work	Award	Result	Ref.
1992	Barbara Mandrell	Woman of the World	Won	
