= No Nonsense =

No Nonsense may refer to:

- No Nonsense (brand), a brand of intimate apparel and hosiery marketed by Kayser-Roth
- No Nonsense (rapper), American rap artist
- No Nonsense (album), an album by Barbara Mandrell
