= Acoustic Attitude =

Studio album (re-recording) by Barbara Mandrell
- Released: April 21, 1994
- Recorded: 1993
- Genre: Acoustic; country
- Length: 38:06
- Label: Direct
- Producer: Barbara Mandrell; Brent Rowan

Barbara Mandrell chronology
Key's in the Mailbox (1991)	Acoustic Attitude (1994)	It Works for Me (1994)

Acoustic Attitude is the twenty-fourth solo studio album by American country artist Barbara Mandrell. It was released on April 21, 1994, on Direct Records and contained 12 tracks. It was Mandrell's twenty-sixth studio recording released in her career and the first to be issued on the Direct label. Acoustic Attitude was a collection of re-recordings of Mandrell's most popular singles from her career. The album was originally sold on television and later released to digital retailers.

== Background and recording ==
Barbara Mandrell was considered by writers to be one of country music's most successful artists during the 1970s and 1980s. Towards the end of 1980s, Mandrell's commercial performance started to wane. She left her major record label (Capitol Records) in 1991. In 1994, it was announced that a New York company called Direct Records would promote and distribute two new albums of Mandrell's material. The albums would be promoted through the label with the help of promotion on television. The album was marketed directly through The Nashville Network beginning in 1994. Acoustic Attitude would be the first of these albums released by the Direct label. According to the liner notes, the project was recorded in late 1993 in Nashville, Tennessee. The session was co-produced by Brent Rowan and Barbara Mandrell. It was the first studio album in Mandrell's career to credit her as a producer.

== Content and release ==
Acoustic Attitude contained a total of 12 tracks. The album's 12 tracks were all newly reinterpreted acoustic versions of Mandrell's most popular songs and hits. Featured on the disc were re-recordings of Mandrell's four number one Billboard country singles: "Sleeping Single in a Double Bed" (1978), "(If Loving You Is Wrong) I Don't Want to Be Right" (1979), "Years" (1979) and "I Was Country When Country Wasn't Cool" (1981). Seven other re-recorded tracks were originally top ten Billboard country songs including "Tonight My Baby's Coming Home" (1971), "The Best of Strangers" (1980) and "To Me" (1984). The album was originally released on April 21, 1994, on Direct Records. It was originally distributed as a compact disc. At the time of its initial release, Acoustic Attitude was only sold on television. It was not available at the time for retail purchase. It was later made available to digital and streaming sites including Spotify.

== Track listing ==
CD and digital versions
No.	Title	Writer(s)	Length
1.	"Sleeping Single in a Double Bed"	Kye Fleming; Dennis Morgan	3:02
2.	"Fast Lanes and Country Roads"	Steve Dean; Roger Murrah	3:42
3.	"The Best of Strangers"	Fleming; Morgan	3:21
4.	"I Wish You Were Here"	Fleming; Morgan	2:40
5.	"To Me"	Mack David; Mike Reid	2:50
6.	"When You Get to the Heart"	Tony Brown; Wayland Holyfield; Norro Wilson	3:35
7.	"Tonight My Baby's Coming Home"	Billy Sherrill; Glenn Sutton	2:37
8.	"(If Loving You Is Wrong) I Don't Want to Be Right"	Homer Banks; Carl Hampton; Raymond Jackson	3:33
9.	"I Wish I Could Fall in Love Today"	Harlan Howard	2:52
10.	"I Was Country When Country Wasn't Cool"	Fleming; Morgan	3:14
11.	"Years"	Fleming; Morgan	3:46
12.	"In Times Like These"	Fleming; Morgan	2:54
Total length:			38:06

== Personnel ==
All credits are adapted from the liner notes of Acoustic Attitude and AllMusic.

Musical personnel

- Charlie Bundy – Acoustic bass guitar, background vocals
- Roger Eaton – Acoustic guitar, background vocals
- Shawn Fitcher – Drums
- Michael Jones – Dobro, pedabro
- Barbara Mandrell – Lead vocals
- Dino Pastin – Harmonica, saxophone, vibraphone
- Brent Rowan – Acoustic guitar, dobro
- Dave Salyer – Acoustic guitar
- Steve Thomas – Fiddle, mandolin
- Chris Walters – Piano

Technical personnel

- Paul Aresu – Photography
- Alex Bartchez – Assistant engineer
- Derek Bason – Assistant engineer
- John Guess – Mixing engineer
- Stephen Jacaruso – Design
- Barbara Mandrell – Producer
- Keith Odle – Engineer
- Brent Rowan – Producer
- Denny Somach – Project coordinator
- Liz Vap – Art direction, design
- Chris Walters – Musical director
- Marty Williams – Assistant engineer, mixing engineer

== Release history ==
Region	Date	Format	Label	Ref.
North America	April 21, 1994	Compact disc	Direct Records	
North America	2010s	Music download; streaming	Direct Records	
