= The Best of Barbara Mandrell =

Greatest hits album by Barbara Mandrell
- Released: January 19, 1979
- Genre: Country pop
- Length: 29:46
- Label: MCA Nashville

Barbara Mandrell chronology
Just for the Record (1979)	The Best of Barbara Mandrell (1979)	Love Is Fair (1980)

Professional ratings
Review scores
Source	Rating
Allmusic	Link
Christgau's Record Guide	C+

The Best of Barbara Mandrell is a compilation album by American country music singer, Barbara Mandrell, released in January 1979.

The Best of Barbara Mandrell covered most of Mandrell's biggest hits from the mid- to late 1970s. It includes the #1 "Sleeping Single In a Double Bed" and other Top 10s, including "Tonight", "Standing Room Only" and "Woman to Woman". The compilation album also includes other charted songs from the era, including "Hold Me" and "Love Is Thin Ice", as well as an album track that earned a Grammy nomination, "After the Lovin'". The album was released by her record company at the time, MCA, which acquired Mandrell after buying the ABC label earlier that same year.

This album was one of Mandrell's biggest-selling albums to date, becoming only one of two Barbara Mandrell albums to have an RIAA certification. The album was certified "gold" shortly after its release in 1979.

== Track listing ==
1. "Woman to Woman" - (James Banks, Eddie Marion, Henderson Thigpen) 3:27
2. "Love Is Thin Ice" - (Geoffrey Morgan) 2:50
3. "Hold Me" - (Glenn Ray) 2:58
4. "After the Lovin'" - (Ritchie Adams, Alan Bernstein) 3:31
5. "Married, But Not to Each Other" - (Denise LaSalle, Frances Miller) 2:58
6. "Sleeping Single In a Double Bed" - (Kye Fleming, Dennis Morgan) 2:20
7. "That's What Friends Are for" - (Rob Parsons, Ed Penney) 2:44
8. "Midnight Angel" - (Bill Anthony, Bob Morrison) 2:51
9. "Standing Room Only" - (Susan Manchester, Charlie Silver) 3:07
10. "Tonight" - (Don Cook, Rafe Van Hoy) 3:00

== Charts ==
=== Weekly charts ===
Chart (1978–1979)	Peak position
US Billboard 200	170
US Top Country Albums (Billboard)	13

=== Year-end charts ===
Chart (1979)	Position
US Top Country Albums (Billboard)	26
