= Precious Memories (Barbara Mandrell album) =

Studio album by Barbara Mandrell
- Released: May 1, 1989
- Recorded: c. January 1989
- Studio: GroundStar Laboratories (Nashville)
- Genre: Gospel
- Length: 62:04
- Label: Heartland Music
- Producer: Tom Collins

Barbara Mandrell chronology
I'll Be Your Jukebox Tonight (1988)	Precious Memories (1989)	Morning Sun (1990)

Precious Memories is the twentieth solo studio album by American country music singer Barbara Mandrell. It was released May 1, 1989, by Heartland Music and was sold through television and radio advertisements. The album is a collection of gospel standards and was produced by Tom Collins. It is Mandrell's second album of gospel music, following 1982's He Set My Life to Music.

== Background ==
Precious Memories was released May 1, 1989, by Heartland Music through Quality Special Products with marketing and promotion being handled by Nashville-based 1-800-COUNTRY. The album was only available as a direct-mail release, being sold through radio and television advertisements, as well as being advertised in the fan magazine Music City News. The entire album was also sent to radio music directors for promotional purposes. It was released on LP, cassette, and CD.

== Track listing ==
Precious Memories
No.	Title	Writer(s)	Length
1.	"I Love to Tell the Story"	Katherine Hankey; William G. Fischer	2:36
2.	"Old Rugged Cross"	George Bennard	2:58
3.	"Farther Along"	Traditional	3:14
4.	"Power in the Blood"	Lewis E. Jones	1:50
5.	"Pass Me Not O Gentle Savior"	Fanny Crosby; William H. Doane	3:14
6.	"Just a Little Talk with Jesus"	Cleavant Derricks	2:09
7.	"I Need Thee Every Hour"	Annie Hawks	2:52
8.	"Peace in the Valley"	Thomas A. Dorsey	3:26
9.	"Just a Closer Walk with Thee"	Traditional	3:43
10.	"He Keeps Me Singing"	Bill Wolaver; Luther B. Bridgers	2:14
11.	"Have Thine Own Way Lord"	Adelaide A. Pollard; George C. Stebbins	2:53
12.	"It Is No Secret (What God Can Do)"	Stuart Hamblen	3:31
13.	"Softly and Tenderly"	Will L. Thompson	3:06
14.	"When We All Go to Heaven"	Eliza E. Hewitt	2:06
15.	"Sweet Hour of Prayer"	William W. Walford	3:28
16.	"In the Garden"	C. Austin Miles	3:37
17.	"Where Could I Go (But to the Lord)"	James B. Coats	4:04
18.	"Let Me Live"	Ben Peters	3:24
19.	"Blessed Assurance"	Crosby; Phoebe Knapp	3:02
20.	"Precious Memories"	J.B.F. Wright	4:37
Total length:			62:04

== Personnel ==
Adapted from the album liner notes.

Performance

- David Briggs – piano, synthesizer
- Larry Byrom – electric guitar
- Jimmy Capps – guitar
- Mitch Humphries – piano
- David Hungate – bass
- Bobby Jones – background vocals
- Shane Keister – piano, synthesizer
- Barbara Mandrell – lead vocals
- New Life – background vocals
  - featuring Emily Harris, Frances Belcher, Jan Whittacker, Robin Johnson, and Angela Wright
- Bobby Ogdin – piano, organ
- Brent Rowan – guitar, electric guitar
- Milton Sledge – drums
- Bob Wray – bass

Production

- Terry Blackwood – arrangements
- Ray Burdett – arrangements
- Tom Collins – producer
- Lura Foster – arrangements
- Ben Harris – engineer
- David Hassell – arrangements
- Paula Imes – studio assistant
- Les Ladd – engineer, mixing
- Derek Lee – arrangements
- Keith Odle – assistant engineer
- Denny Purcell – mastering

Other personnel

- Teddy Heard – project coordinator
- The Stanford Group – jacket design
