= Playin' Around with Love =

Single by Barbara Mandrell

from the album Treat Him Right
- B-side: "I Almost Lost My Mind"
- Released: April 20, 1970
- Recorded: February 23, 1970
- Studio: Columbia (Nashville, Tennessee)
- Genre: Countrypolitan; soul
- Length: 2:30
- Label: Columbia
- Songwriter: Billy Sherrill
- Producer: Billy Sherrill

Barbara Mandrell singles chronology
"I've Been Loving You Too Long (To Stop Now)" (1969)	"Playin' Around with Love" (1970)	"Do Right Woman, Do Right Man" (1970)

"Treat Him Right" is a song written by Billy Sherrill, and recorded by American country music artist Barbara Mandrell. It was released in April 1970 as the second single from the album Treat Him Right. It was of one Mandrell's first single releases in her career and was her first to reach the top 20 on the American country songs chart.

== Background and recording ==
Barbara Mandrell signed her first recording contract with Columbia Records in 1969 and had a series of top 40 charting singles early in her career. Mandrell's Columbia recordings mixed country music with a soul production. Among her early recordings was "Playin' Around with Love". The song was composed by Billy Sherrill, who also served as the song's producer. It was recorded at the Columbia Recording Studios, located in Nashville, Tennessee. The session took place on February 23, 1970. On the same recording session, Mandrell also cut "I Almost Lost My Mind".

== Release and chart performance ==
"Playin' Around with Love" was released as a single on Columbia Records on April 20, 1970. It was backed on the B-side by the song "I Almost Lost My Mind". The track was issued by the label as a seven inch vinyl single. The single spent 12 weeks on America's Billboard country songs chart, peaking at the number 18 spot. It became Mandrell's first top 40 charting single and first to reach the top 20 in her career. It was also her second single release for the Columbia label. In Canada, "Playin' Around with Love" was her first single to enter the RPM Country Singles chart, climbing to number 48 in 1970. The song was released on Mandrell's debut studio LP titled Treat Him Right. The album was released in 1971.

== Track listing ==
7" vinyl single

- "Playin' Around with Love" – 2:30
- "I Almost Lost My Mind" – 2:49

== Charts ==
Chart performance for "Playin' Around with Love"
Chart (1970)	Peak position
Canada Country Songs (RPM)	48
US Hot Country Songs (Billboard)	18
