= Key's in the Mailbox =

Studio album by Barbara Mandrell
- Released: September 24, 1991
- Recorded: April 15, 1991 (Nashville, TN)
- Studio: Emerald Studio
- Genre: Country
- Length: 30:25
- Label: Capitol
- Producer: Jimmy Bowen

Barbara Mandrell chronology
No Nonsense (1990)	Key's in the Mailbox (1991)	Acoustic Attitude (1994)

Singles from Key's in the Mailbox
- 1. "The Key's in the Mailbox" Released: August 26, 1991

Professional ratings
Review scores
Source	Rating
Allmusic	3/5 stars

Key's in the Mailbox is the twenty-third solo studio album released by American country artist Barbara Mandrell. The album was released September 24, 1991, on Capitol Records and was produced by Jimmy Bowen. It was Mandrell's fourth and final album for the Capitol label.

== Background and content ==
Key's in the Mailbox was recorded in spring 1991 at Emerald Studio in Nashville, Tennessee, United States. The album consisted of 10 tracks of songs recorded in a traditional country arrangement, similar to that of her previous Capitol releases. The opening title track was written by Harlan Howard, who previously contributed to Mandrell's 1988 release I'll Be Your Jukebox Tonight. The second track entitled "Tall Drink of Water" included a Country and Western arrangement. "Try Gettin' Over You" was co-written by American pop artist Michael Bolton and "I Love You Because" had previously been recorded by Leon Payne and Elvis Presley. The album also includes a cover of Percy Sledge's "When a Man Loves a Woman". The album was originally released on a compact disc upon its release in 1991 and was also available on audio cassette. Bill Carpenter of Allmusic gave Key's in the Mailbox three out five stars, calling the album "Heartful soul and contemporary country."

== Release ==
Key's in the Mailbox was released on September 24, 1991, and peaked at #62 on the Billboard Magazine Top Country Albums chart shortly afterward. It would be Mandrell's final release to chart on any Billboard album list. Key's in the Mailbox was Mandrell's final studio release for Capitol Records, after recording four albums for the label between 1988 and 1991.

== Track list ==
No.	Title	Writer(s)	Length
1.	"The Key's in the Mailbox"	Harlan Howard	2:10
2.	"Tall Drink of Water"	Susan Longacre, Zack Turner	2:26
3.	"You're All I've Got to Lose"	Byron Hill, Cyril Pearson	3:19
4.	"Before I'm Ever Over You"	Sandy Ramos, Jerry Vandiver	2:27
5.	"When a Man Loves a Woman"	Calvin Lewis, Andrew Wright	3:18
6.	"This Rock"	Naomi Martin, Rhonda Gunn	3:18
7.	"Try Gettin' Over You"	Michael Bolton, Doug James	4:03
8.	"The Way I Feel Right Now"	Bill Kenner, Thom McHugh	3:01
9.	"I Love You Because"	Leon Payne	3:11
10.	"Road to Your Heart"	Wendy Waldman, Josh Leo, Jim Photoglo	3:12
Total length:			30:25

== Personnel ==
From album liner notes

- Rick Baird - background vocals
- Eddie Bayers – drums
- Dan Britton - background vocals
- Walt Cunningham - horns (synth), strings (synth)
- Jerry Douglas - dobro
- Paul Franklin – steel guitar
- John Jarvis - piano
- Terry Kaufman - background vocals
- Barbara Mandrell – lead vocals
- George Marinelli - electric guitar
- Jimmy Ponder - background vocals
- Brent Rowan - electric guitar
- Lee Satterfield - background vocals
- Leland Sklar – bass
- Harry Stinson - background vocals
- Billy Joe Walker Jr. - acoustic guitar
- Chris Walters - synthesizer
- Lonnie Wilson - background vocals
- Jonathan Yudkin - fiddle

== Chart positions ==
Chart (1991)	Peak position
U.S. Top Country Albums	62
