= Treat Him Right =

Studio album by Barbara Mandrell
- Released: September 9, 1971
- Recorded: July 3, 1969–April 21, 1971
- Studio: Columbia (Nashville, Tennessee)
- Genre: Country soul
- Length: 28:11
- Label: Columbia
- Producer: Billy Sherrill

Barbara Mandrell chronology
Treat Him Right (1971)	A Perfect Match (1972)

Singles from Treat Him Right
- 1. "I've Been Loving You Too Long (To Stop Now)" Released: July 28, 1969; 2. "Playin' Around with Love" Released: April 20, 1970; 3. "Do Right Woman, Do Right Man" Released: January 4, 1971; 4. "Treat Him Right" Released: May 31, 1971

Professional ratings
Review scores
Source	Rating
AllMusic	3/5 stars

Treat Him Right is the debut studio album released by American country artist Barbara Mandrell. The album was released September 9, 1971, on Columbia Records and was produced by Billy Sherrill. It contained a series of singles Mandrell had released between 1969 and 1970 and would be the first of a series of albums recorded at the Columbia label.

== Background and content ==
Treat Him Right was recorded between May 1969 and April 1971 at the Columbia Recording Studios in Nashville, Tennessee, United States. The album contained 11 tracks. The album's tracks had a country soul sound and included covers of R&B songs such as Otis Redding's "I've Been Loving You Too Long (To Stop Now)" and Aretha Franklin's "Do Right Woman, Do Right Man". Allmusic's Al Campbell reviewed the double compilation release of Treat Him Right and The Midnight Oil and considered Treat Him Right to not only have an apparent Country-soul sound, but also included "an interesting combination of pop, country, and soul." It also featured a cover version of Joe South's "The Games People Play". The album's producer, Billy Sherrill wrote two songs for the album: "He'll Never Take the Place of You" and "Playin' Around with Love". Treat Him Right was released on an LP album upon its original release in September 1971, with five songs on the A-side of the record and six songs on the B-side of the record. The record received three out of five stars by AllMusic.

== Release ==
Treat Him Right included the four singles Barbara Mandrell released between 1969 and early 1971. The debut single was Mandrell's cover version of "I've Been Loving You Too Long (To Stop Now)", released in May 1969. The single only peaked at #55 on the Billboard Magazine Hot Country Songs chart. The second single was released in April 1970 "Playin' Around with Love", which became her first major hit, reaching #18 on the Billboard Magazine Hot Country Songs chart. "Do Right Woman, Do Right Man" was the third single, reaching #17 on the Country Singles chart as well as hitting the Bubbling Under Hot 100. The final single was the title track, which became her biggest solo hit to that point, reaching #12 on the Hot Country Songs list. Treat Him Right was released on September 9, 1971 and peaked at #44 on the Billboard Magazine Top Country Albums chart, her first album to chart on that list.

== Track listing ==
Side one
No.	Title	Writer(s)	Recording date	Length
1.	"Do Right Woman – Do Right Man"	Dan Penn; Chips Moman	July 14, 1970	2:09
2.	"He'll Never Take the Place of You"	Billy Sherrill; Charlie Daniels; Bob Johnston	July 3, 1969	3:13
3.	"Playin' Around with Love"	Sherrill	February 23, 1970	2:30
4.	"I've Been Loving You Too Long (To Stop Now)"	Otis Redding, Jerry Butler	July 3, 1969	2:09
5.	"The Letter"	Wayne Carson Thompson	November 18, 1970	2:10

Side two
No.	Title	Writer(s)	Recording date	Length
1.	"Treat Him Right"	Roy Head	April 21, 1971	2:15
2.	"Break My Mind"	John D. Loudermilk	November 18, 1970	2:22
3.	"Watching My World Walk Away"	Dallas Frazier	November 26, 1969	2:49
4.	"Baby, Come Home"	Forest Borders	July 3, 1969	2:51
5.	"I Almost Lost My Mind"	Ivory Joe Hunter	February 23, 1970	2:50
6.	"Games People Play"	Joe South	November 18, 1970	2:53

== Personnel ==
- Harold Bradley – guitar
- Kenneth Buttrey – drums
- Pete Drake – steel guitar, dobro
- Lloyd Green – steel guitar, dobro
- Buddy Harman – drums
- The Jordanaires – background vocals
- Barbara Mandrell – lead vocals
- Grady Martin – guitar
- Bob Moore – bass
- Hargus "Pig" Robbins – piano
- Billy Sanford – guitar
- Buddy Spicher – fiddle
- Chip Young – guitar

== Charts ==
=== Weekly charts ===
Chart (1971)	Peak position
U.S. Top Country Albums	44

=== Singles ===
Year	Song	Peak chart positions		
Year	Song	US Country	US	CAN Country
1969	"I've Been Loving You Too Long (To Stop Now)"	55	—	—
1970	"Playin' Around with Love"	18	—	48
1970	"Do Right Woman, Do Right Man"	17	128	—
1971	"Treat Him Right"	12	—	—
"—" denotes releases that did not chart.
