= No Nonsense (rapper) =

American rapper

Stacey A. Jones, professionally known as No Nonsense, is an American rapper from Olympia, Washington. Since 2005, No Nonsense has recorded over 400 tracks with various regional and nationally recognized artists, including Divine Mental, Overtime, JoJo, and many more. His latest project, "The I-5 Bandit," includes appearances from numerous well-known acts, such as Nicki Minaj, Mistah FAB, and more.

No Nonsense has slowly expanded his pursuit of hip-hop fame and fortune to include such partnerships as Northwest Connect, featuring artists Young Soprano, E-Tab, and No Nonsense collaborating, as well as other hip-hop cultural ventures such as custom auto detailing and installation, signing multiple acts to his label, Double Trouble Records, and pushing for distribution of Northwest artists.

Having developed a feel for his market and audience, incorporated social media into his guerilla marketing campaign, and recruited his twin brother, CEO Stephen Jones, an in-house engineer, aaron j., and numerous die-hard independent hip-hop acts, No Nonsense has continued to expand his national ambitions, and is currently working on a multi-city tour with his label's talent as well as reaching out to other Northwest hiphop acts.
