= My Train of Thought =

- Cassette single cover art

Single by Barbara Mandrell

from the album I'll Be Your Jukebox Tonight
- B-side: "Blanket of Love"
- Released: February 4, 1989
- Genre: Country
- Length: 2:37
- Label: Capitol Nashville
- Songwriters: Bruce Burch, Michael Woody
- Producer: Tom Collins

Barbara Mandrell singles chronology
"I Wish That I Could Fall in Love Today" (1988)	"My Train of Thought" (1989)	"Mirror, Mirror" (1989)

"My Train of Thought" is a song written by Bruce Burch and Michael Woody, and recorded by American country music artist Barbara Mandrell. It was released in February 1989 as the second single from the album I'll Be Your Jukebox Tonight. The song became Mandrell's final Top 40 single, reaching number 19 on the Billboard Hot Country Singles & Tracks chart.

== Chart performance ==
Chart (1989)	Peak position
Canada Country Singles (RPM)	15
US Hot Country Songs (Billboard)	19
