= No One Mends a Broken Heart Like You =

Single by Barbara Mandrell

from the album Moments
- B-side: "Love Is Adventure in the Great Unknown"
- Released: August 4, 1986
- Genre: Country
- Length: 3:09
- Label: MCA
- Songwriter(s): John Schweers
- Producer(s): Tom Collins

Barbara Mandrell singles chronology
"When You Get to the Heart" (1986)	"No One Mends a Broken Heart Like You" (1986)	"Sure Feels Good" (1987)

No One Mends a Broken Like You is a song written by John Schweers, and recorded by American country music artist Barbara Mandrell. It was released in August 1986 as the first single from the album Moments. The song reached number 6 on the Billboard Hot Country Singles & Tracks chart.

== Chart performance ==
Chart (1986)	Peak position
US Hot Country Songs (Billboard)	6
Canadian RPM Country Tracks	5
