= It Works for Me =

Studio album by Barbara Mandrell
- Released: April 21, 1994
- Studio: Groundstar Lab
- Genre: Country
- Length: 43:28
- Label: Direct; Razor & Tie
- Producer: Barbara Mandrell; Brent Rowan

Barbara Mandrell chronology
Acoustic Attitude (1994)	It Works for Me (1994)

It Works for Me (1997 cover)

It Works for Me is the twenty-fifth and final solo studio album by American country artist Barbara Mandrell. It was originally released on April 21, 1994, via Direct Records. The original version of the album was only sold on television through a marketing campaign. In 1997, it was re-released via Razor & Tie and was sold to retailers in multiple formats. Both releases contained the same track listing of 12 songs. The album contained a mixture of covers as well as original material. It was Mandrell's twenty seventh studio project and the final studio project released in her career.

== Background and recording ==
In the late 1970s and early 1980s, Barbara Mandrell was considered among country music's most successful artists. During this period she had a series of top ten and number one singles on the North American country charts. By the end of the 1980s, Mandrell's singles began to reach progressively lower chart positions, although she remained on a major label until the early 1990s. In 1994, it was announced that Direct Records (a New York based record company) would release two studio albums of Mandrell's music directly through television marketing. They were not sold in retail stores despite a willingness from specialty companies. The two albums would be Acoustic Attitude and It Works for Me. The disc was recorded at the Groundstar Lab, a studio located in Nashville, Tennessee. The sessions were co-produced by Brent Rowan and Mandrell. It was her second studio album to include Mandrell on production credits.

== Content and release ==
It Works for Me was a collection of 12 recordings new to Mandrell's catalog. It included several covers, including Brenda Russell's "Get Here" and Van Morrison's "Have I Told You Lately". It also featured the original tracks "I Won't Be Home Tonight" and "Love by Any Name". Also included was the track "Ten Pound Hammer", which was first recorded by Aaron Tippin for his 1995 album Tool Box. The album was first released on April 21, 1994, on Direct Records. It was originally distributed as a compact disc. The disc's release marked the twenty seventh studio album of Mandrell's music career. It was sold exclusively on television in combination with what was described by Billboard as a "fan pack". Items included in the package were a biography and an autographed photo. It was mostly marketed on The Nashville Network.

In March 1997, it was announced that Mandrell had signed a recording contract with the Razor & Tie label. One month later, the label re-released It Works for Me with the same track listing, however the photography was different. It was made available as both a compact disc and as a cassette. Years later, the album was reissued to digital platforms including Spotify. It Works for Me marked the final album in Mandrell's recording career. She would retire from the entertainment industry shortly after the disc's 1997 re-release.

== Track listing ==
=== Compact disc and digital versions ===
It Works for Me (1994) (1997)
No.	Title	Writer(s)	Length
1.	"Ten Pound Hammer"	Dennis Linde	2:53
2.	"To My Heart"	Steve Bogard; Tony Haselden	2:54
3.	"Heart from a Stone"	Beth Nielsen Chapman; Mark Germino	3:35
4.	"I Won't Be Home Tonight"	Bob Gaudio; Roger Murrah	3:35
5.	"Get Here"	Brenda Russell	4:22
6.	"Your One and Only"	Hillary Kanter; Even Stevens	3:18
7.	"Temptation"	Gary Lloyd; Jimmy Stewart	3:53
8.	"Love by Any Name"	Jim Daddario; Don Pfrimmer	3:40
9.	"A Little Time for Us"	Sam Hogin; Monty Powell; Kim Williams	3:18
10.	"Just Like Me"	Debbie Hupp; Bob Morrison	3:36
11.	"Weight of the World"	Mac McAnally	3:56
12.	"Have I Told You Lately"	Van Morrison	4:28
Total length:			43:28

=== Cassette version ===
Side one (1997)
No.	Title	Writer(s)	Length
1.	"Ten Pound Hammer"	Linde	2:53
2.	"To My Heart"	Bogard; Haselden	2:54
3.	"Heart from a Stone"	Chapman; Germino	3:35
4.	"I Won't Be Home Tonight"	Gaudio; Murrah	3:35
5.	"Get Here"	Russell	4:22
6.	"Your One and Only"	Kanter; Stevens	3:18

Side two (1997)
No.	Title	Writer(s)	Length
1.	"Temptation"	Lloyd; Stewart	3:53
2.	"Love by Any Name"	Daddario; Pfrimmer	3:40
3.	"A Little Time for Us"	Hogin; Powell; Williams	3:18
4.	"Just Like Me"	Hupp; Morrison	3:36
5.	"Weight of the World"	McAnally	3:56
6.	"Have I Told You Lately"	Morrison	4:28

== Personnel ==
All credits are adapted from the liner notes of It Works for Me and AllMusic.

Musical personnel

- Michael Black – Background vocals
- Gary Burr – Background vocals
- Bruce Dees – Background vocals
- Owen Hale – Drums
- Jim Horn – Saxophone
- Barbara Mandrell – Lead vocals
- Steve Nathan – Keyboards
- Michael Rhodes – Bass
- John Wesley Ryles – Background vocals
- Brent Rowan – Guitar
- Dennis Wilson – Background vocals

Technical personnel

- Paul Aresu – Photography
- Derek Bason – Assistant engineer
- Eric Darken – Percussion
- John Guess – Mixing engineer
- John Hurley – Assistant engineer
- Ioannis – Art direction, design
- Stephen Jacaruso – Design
- Barbara Mandrell – Producer
- Keith Odle – Engineer
- Brent Rowan – Producer
- Denny Somach – Project coordinator
- Liz Vap – Art direction, design
- Marty Williams – Assistant engineer, mixing engineer

== Release history ==
Region	Date	Format	Label	Ref.
North America	April 21, 1994	Compact disc	Direct Records	
North America	April 22, 1997	Compact disc	Razor & Tie	
North America	April 22, 1997	Cassette	Razor & Tie	
North America	2010s	Music download; streaming	Razor & Tie	
