= I Wish I Could Fall in Love Today =

Single by Ray Price
- B-side: "I Can't Run Away from Myself"
- Released: October 3, 1960
- Genre: Country
- Label: Columbia
- Songwriter(s): Harlan Howard

Ray Price singles chronology
"One More Time" (1960)	"I Wish I Could Fall in Love Today" (1960)	"Heart Over Mind" (1961)

"I Wish I Could I Fall in Love Today" is a song written by Harlan Howard, and recorded by American country music artist Ray Price. It was released in 1960 as a single only. The song reached #5 on the Billboard Hot Country Singles & Tracks chart.

== Ray Price version ==
=== Chart performance ===
Chart (1960)	Peak position
US Hot Country Songs (Billboard)	5

"I Wish That I Could Fall in Love Today"

Single by Barbara Mandrell

from the album I'll Be Your Jukebox Tonight
- B-side: "I'll Be Your Jukebox Tonight"
- Released: August 20, 1988
- Genre: Country
- Length: 2:51
- Label: Capitol
- Songwriter(s): Harlan Howard
- Producer(s): Tom Collins, Fred Foster

Barbara Mandrell singles chronology
"Angels Love Bad Men" (1988)	"I Wish That I Could Fall in Love Today" (1988)	"My Train of Thought" (1989)

== Barbara Mandrell version ==
The song was also recorded by American country music artist Barbara Mandrell, under the title "I Wish That I Could Fall in Love Today". It was released in August 1988 as the first single from the album I'll Be Your Jukebox Tonight. The song reached #5 on the Billboard Hot Country Singles & Tracks chart, becoming Mandrell's final Top 10 single.

=== Charts ===
==== Weekly charts ====
Chart (1988)	Peak position
US Hot Country Songs (Billboard)	5
Canadian RPM Country Tracks	2

==== Year-end charts ====
Chart (1988)	Position
US Hot Country Songs (Billboard)	96
