= Moments (Barbara Mandrell album) =

Studio album by Barbara Mandrell
- Released: August 25, 1986
- Recorded: June 1986 (Nashville, TN)
- Genre: Country, Country pop
- Length: 31:47
- Label: MCA
- Producer: Tom Collins

Barbara Mandrell chronology
Get to the Heart (1985)	Moments (1986)	Sure Feels Good (1987)

Singles from Moments
- 1. "No One Mends a Broken Heart Like You" Released: July 21, 1986

Moments is the seventeenth solo studio album released by American country artist Barbara Mandrell. The album was released in August 1986 on MCA Records and was produced by Tom Collins. It would be her final studio release for the MCA label before signing with EMI America Records in 1987.

== Background ==
Moments was recorded in June 1986 in Nashville, Tennessee, two months before its official release. Moments contained 10 tracks of newly recorded material. Mandrell's musical style and sound changed for the album, as most of its tracks had a significant traditional country music approach, as traditional musical styles were reentering country music. This was exemplified in songs such as the sixth track, "No One Mends a Broken Heart Like You". The collection was issued as an LP album, with five songs on each side of the record.

Moments was not provided with any music reviews by critics, including Allmusic.

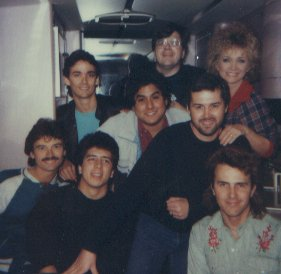
Mandrell with DoRites on the bus ‘Moments’ tour 1986

== Release ==
Moments only spawned one single, "No One Mends a Broken Heart Like You". The single was released in July 1986 and peaked at #6 on the Billboard Magazine Hot Country Singles & Tracks chart. In addition, the single also reached #5 on the Canadian RPM Country Tracks chart the same year. Moments was released in August 1986, a month after the single's release. The album peaked at #53 on the Billboard Magazine Top Country Albums chart after its release, Mandrell's lowest peak on the chart. Shortly after its release, Mandrell left MCA Records and signed with EMI America Records in 1987.

== Track listing ==
Side one

1. "Love's Gonna Get You" (Roger Murrah, Clif Magness) – 3:47
2. "Love Is Adventure in the Great Unknown" (John Schweers)– 3:00
3. "I'd Put Angels Around You" (Bobby Wood, Pat Bunch) – 3:04
4. "Freedom Feels Like Loneliness Today" (Charles Browder, John Wesley Ryles) – 2:32
5. "Come as You Were" (Paul Craft) – 2:46

Side two

1. "No One Mends a Broken Heart Like You" (Schweers) – 3:12
2. "Grand Tour of My Heart" (Carson Whitsett, Frederick Knight) – 4:00
3. "You Know What I'm Not Talking About" (Steve Dean, Verlon Thompson) – 3:01
4. "(You're Still My) Hand Holder" (Jeff Pearson) – 3:23
5. "Moments" (Jim Daddario, Don Pfrimmer) – 3:02

== Sales chart positions ==
Album

Chart (1986)	Peak position
U.S. Top Country Albums	53

Singles

Year	Song	Chart positions	
Year	Song	US Country	CAN Country
1986	"No One Mends a Broken Heart Like You"	6	5
