= Morning Sun (album) =

Studio album by Barbara Mandrell
- Released: March 27, 1990
- Recorded: c. April 1989
- Studio: Groundstar Recording Lab (Nashville); The Music Mill (Nashville)
- Genre: Country
- Length: 32:46
- Label: Capitol
- Producer: Tom Collins

Barbara Mandrell chronology
Precious Memories (1989)	Morning Sun (1990)	No Nonsense (1990)

Singles from Morning Sun
- 1. "You Wouldn't Know Love (If It Looked You in the Eye)" Released: January 1, 1990; 2. "You've Become the Dream" Released: April 30, 1990

Morning Sun is the twenty-first solo studio album released by American country artist Barbara Mandrell. The album was released in March 1990 on Capitol Records. It was Mandrell's second studio release for the Capitol label.

== Background and content ==
Morning Sun was recorded in June 1989 at the Groundstar Recording Lab and the Music Mill, both located in Nashville, Tennessee, United States. The album consisted of 10 tracks of new material. The album's fifth track "Crazy Arms" was a cover version of the single by Ray Price. Price and Mandrell sang the song as a duet. The album also included the track "Do You Know Where Your Man Is", which country artist Pam Tillis would later record for her album, Homeward Looking Angel and would become a Top 20 single. The album's style is mainly traditional country music, with fiddles and steel guitars featured. The album was originally released on a compact disc upon its release in 1990.

== Release ==
Morning Sun spawned three singles between 1989 and 1990. The lead single, "You Wouldn't Know Love (If It Looked You in the Eye)" was released in November 1989. The song failed to chart on the United States' Billboard Magazine Hot Country Singles & Tracks chart, but did peak at #81 on the Canadian RPM Country Tracks chart in early March 1990. The single became Mandrell's final single to chart in Canada and any other singles chart. The album's second and third singles "You've Become the Dream" and "The Nearness of You" were released in 1990, but both failed to reach the Billboard and RPM country singles charts. The album was released in April 1990 and also failed to chart, not reaching the Billboard Top Country Albums chart.

== Critical reception ==
A review in People was mostly negative, criticizing Mandrell's singing voice as "stiff" and "whiny" on certain tracks. The reviewer thought that the "Crazy Arms" cover was the only song on which she "get[s] much emotion across".

== Track listing ==
1. "The Nearness of You" (Hoagy Carmichael / Ned Washington)
2. "Do You Know Where Your Man Is" – (Carol Chase, Dave Gibson, Russell Smith)
3. "I'm Not Your Super Woman" (L.A. Reid, Babyface, Daryl Simmons)
4. "Trying Times" - (Keith Palmer, Sharon Palmer)
5. "Crazy Arms" – (Ralph Mooney, Chuck Seals)
  - with Ray Price
6. "You Wouldn't Know Love (If It Looked You in the Eye)" (Hank Cochran / Dave Kirby)
7. "Baby I Hate" (Keith Stegall / Steve Davis)
8. "It's Over for the Last Time Again" (Musick, Palmer, Barker)
9. "Why Do Bad Things Happen to Good People" (Keith Stegall, Roger Murrah)
10. "You've Become the Dream" (James Dean Hicks, Murrah)

== Sales chart positions ==
Singles

Year	Song	Chart positions
Year	Song	CAN Country
1989	You Wouldn't Know Love (If It Looked You in the Eye)"	81
