= Moods (Barbara Mandrell album) =

Studio album by Barbara Mandrell
- Released: September 29, 1978
- Genre: Country pop
- Length: 29:18
- Label: ABC
- Producer: Tom Collins

Barbara Mandrell chronology
Love's Ups and Downs (1977)	Moods (1978)	Just for the Record (1979)

Singles from Moods
- 1. "Sleeping Single in a Double Bed" Released: August 21, 1978; 2. "(If Loving You is Wrong) I Don't Want to Be Right" Released: January 22, 1979

Professional ratings
Review scores
Source	Rating
Allmusic	3/5 stars

Moods is the eighth solo studio album by American country music singer Barbara Mandrell, released in September 1978.

Moods became Mandrell's most successful album during her career up to this point. The album spawned two singles, both of which became #1 country hits, "Sleeping Single in a Double Bed" and a remake of the popular Luther Ingram R&B hit, "(If Loving You Is Wrong) I Don't Want to Be Right". Both singles also charted on the Pop and Adult Contemporary charts. "If Loving You Is Wrong" became Mandrell's only Top 40 Pop hit, peaking at #31 on the Billboard Hot 100 chart. The popularity of these singles made "Moods" a success, peaking at #8 on the Top Country Albums chart – her highest charting album at that time. The album was also Mandrell's first to chart on the Billboard 200, peaking at #132.

Moods consisted of 10 tracks, ranging from sultry ballads to bouncy pop tunes. The album foreshadowed the success Mandrell would have well into the 1980s, when she would achieve more best-selling albums and reach the pinnacle of her career. She would become one of the few women to win "Entertainer of the Year" (and the first person to ever win it twice) from the Country Music Association and would also win American Music Awards and two Grammy awards.

== Track listing ==
All songs written by Kye Fleming and Dennis Morgan, except where noted.

No.	Title	Writer(s)	Length
1.	"(If Loving You Is Wrong) I Don't Want to Be Right"	Homer Banks, Carl Hampton, Raymond Jackson	3:04
2.	"Sleeping Single In a Double Bed"		2:19
3.	"No Walls, No Ceilings, No Floors"	Archie Jordan, Hal David	2:49
4.	"It's a Cryin' Shame"		3:04
5.	"Early Fall"	John Schweers	3:31
6.	"Pity Party"		2:29
7.	"I Feel the Hurt Comin' On"		2:52
8.	"Just One More of Your Goodbyes"		3:15
9.	"I Believe You"	Dick Addrisi, Don Addrisi	3:16
10.	"Don't Bother to Knock"		2:39

== Personnel ==
Compiled from liner notes.

Musicians

- Hayward Bishop – drums
- David Briggs – piano
- Clyde Brooks – Pollard Syndrum
- Pete Bordonali – guitar
- James Burton – guitar
- Jimmy Capps – guitar
- Bruce Dees Singers – background vocals
- Janie Fricke – background vocals
- Dr. Lee Hargrove-Stein – synthesizer
- John Hughey – steel guitar
- Lea Jane Singers – background vocals
- Shane Keister – synthesizer
- Sheldon Kurland – strings
- Michael Leech – bass guitar
- Larrie Londin – drums
- Kenneth Malone – drums
- Charlie McCoy – harmonica, vibraphone
- Terry McMillan – harmonica, vibraphone
- Tony Migliore – synthesizer
- Robert Ogdin – piano
- Dale Sellers – guitar
- Chip Young – guitar

Technical

- Rex Collier – engineering
- Tom Collins – production
- Steve Goostree – mastering
- Danny Hilley – engineering
- Archie Jordan – string arrangement
- Les Ladd – engineering, mixing
- Denny Purcell – mastering
- Skip Shimmin – mastering

== Charts ==
=== Weekly charts ===
Chart (1978–1979)	Peak position
US Billboard 200	132
US Top Country Albums (Billboard)	8

=== Year-end charts ===
Chart (1979)	Position
US Top Country Albums (Billboard)	13

=== Singles ===
Year	Single	Chart	Position
1978	"Sleeping Single In a Double Bed"	Hot Country Singles & Tracks	#1
1978	"Sleeping Single In a Double Bed"	Bubbling Hot 100	#102
1979	"(If Loving You Is Wrong) I Don't Want to Be Right"	Hot Country Singles & Tracks	#1
1979	"(If Loving You Is Wrong) I Don't Want to Be Right"	Billboard Hot 100	#31
1979	"(If Loving You Is Wrong) I Don't Want to Be Right"	Hot Adult Contemporary Tracks	#6
