= A Perfect Match (David Houston and Barbara Mandrell album) =

Studio album by Barbara Mandrell & David Houston
- Released: August 23, 1972
- Recorded: c. July 1970—c. June 1972
- Studio: Columbia (Nashville, Tennessee)
- Genre: Country
- Label: Columbia
- Producer: Billy Sherrill

Singles from A Perfect Match
- 1. "After Closing Time" Released: September 17, 1970; 2. "We've Got Everything But Love" Released: August 23, 1971; 3. "A Perfect Match" Released: August 21, 1972; 4. "I Love You, I Love You" Released: November 26, 1973; 5. "Lovin' You Is Worth It" Released: April 22, 1974

Professional ratings
Review scores
Source	Rating
Allmusic	2.5/5 stars

A Perfect Match is a collaborative studio album by American country music singers David Houston and Barbara Mandrell. It was released on August 23, 1972, by Columbia Records.

This was the first duet album Mandrell recorded and would be one of two she would release during her career. Houston had already experienced success the previous decade, with his #1 country hit "Almost Persuaded". Mandrell, on the other hand, was a newcomer, having released her debut album in 1971.

This album spawned two singles, both of them major hits on the country charts. The first, "After Closing Time", reached the Top 10, peaking at #6. The second, "I Love You, I Love You", was released the following year under Epic Records, and also peaked at #6. A Perfect Match was not as successful as those two singles, peaking at #38 on the Top Country Albums chart in 1972. Besides the two singles, the album included a duet re-recording of Houston's "Almost Persuaded".

== Track listing ==
1. "A Perfect Match" (Ben Peters, Glenn Sutton)
2. "We're Gonna Make It All the Way" (Bill Rice, Jerry Foster)
3. "I Love You, I Love You" (Danny Walls, Norro Wilson)
4. "Something to Brag About" (Bobby Braddock)
5. "Try a Little Harder" (Larry Ryan, Thomas Kramer)
6. "After Closing Time" (Billy Sherrill, Walls, Wilson)
7. "Almost Persuaded" (Sherrill, Sutton)
8. "How Can It Be Wrong (When It Feels So Right)" (Walls, Wilson)
9. "We Go Together" (Walls, Wilson)
10. "Lovin' You Is Worth It" (Carmol Taylor, Quinton Claunch)
11. "We've Got Everything But Love" (Taylor)

== Charts ==
Album – Billboard (North America)

Year	Chart	Position
1972	Top Country Albums	#38

Singles – Billboard (North America)

Year	Single	Chart	Position
1970	"After Closing Time"	Hot Country Singles & Tracks	#6
1970	"I Love You, I Love You"	Hot Country Singles & Tracks	#6
