= I'll Be Your Jukebox Tonight =

Studio album by Barbara Mandrell
- Released: September 20, 1988
- Recorded: May 1988 (Nashville, TN)
- Genre: Country
- Length: 27:43
- Label: Capitol
- Producer: Tom Collins (all tracks), Fred Foster (track 6)

Barbara Mandrell chronology
Sure Feels Good (1987)	I'll Be Your Jukebox Tonight (1988)	Precious Memories (1989)

Singles from I'll Be Your Jukebox Tonight
- 1. "I Wish That I Could Fall in Love Today" Released: August 1, 1988; 2. "My Train of Thought" Released: January 9, 1989; 3. "Mirror, Mirror" Released: June 5, 1989

Professional ratings
Review scores
Source	Rating
Allmusic	2/5 stars

I'll Be Your Jukebox Tonight is the nineteenth solo studio album by American country artist Barbara Mandrell. The album was released in September 1988 on Capitol Records and was produced by Tom Collins. It would be the first of four albums Mandrell released under Capitol.

== Background and content ==
I'll Be Your Jukebox Tonight was recorded in May 1988 in Nashville, Tennessee, United States. Like her previous release for EMI America Records, Mandrell carried over Tom Collins as her producer for the album, with additional production from Fred Foster on "I Wish I Could Fall in Love Today". The album consisted of 10 tracks. Mandrell's sound for her 1988 release changed to a more traditional country music approach, similar to many other country artists of the time. The album included a cover version of Wynn Stewart's 1961 single, "Big, Big Love", which is the second track on the album. The single, "I Wish That I Could Fall in Love Today" was written by Harlan Howard, who had written songs such as Patsy Cline's "I Fall to Pieces". I'll Be Your Jukebox Tonight was released on a compact disc in 1988 and was also available on LP Record and cassette as well.

I'll Be Your Jukebox Tonight received only two out of five stars by Allmusic.

== Release ==
I'll Be Your Jukebox Tonight spawned three singles between 1988 and 1989. The lead single "I Wish That I Could Fall in Love Today" was released in July 1988, peaking at #5 on the Billboard Magazine Hot Country Singles & Tracks chart, becoming her first single since 1986 to reach the Top 10. It would also become Mandrell's final Top 10 single. "My Train of Thought" was released as the second single in January 1989, peaking at #19 on the Billboard Country Singles chart and #15 on the Canadian RPM Country Tracks chart. The third single "Mirror, Mirror" was released in May 1989 and peaked at #49 on the Billboard Country chart and became her final charting single in the United States. I'll Be Your Jukebox Tonight was issued in November 1988 and peaked at #35 on the Billboard Magazine Top Country Albums chart.

== Track listing ==
1. "I'll Be Your Jukebox Tonight" (James Dean Hicks, Roger Murrah) - 2:21
2. "Big, Big Love" (Ray Carroll, Wynn Stewart) - 2:26
3. "Mirror, Mirror" (Bobby Barker, Phil Thomas) - 2:59
4. "Blanket of Love" (Steve Dean, Keith Stegall) - 3:23
5. "My Train of Thought" (Bruce Burch, Michael Woody) - 2:36
6. "I Wish I Could Fall in Love Today" (Harlan Howard) - 2:50
7. "My Heart Is in the Right Place This Time" (Charlie Craig, Murrah, Stegall) - 2:27
8. "I Dropped Your Name" (Terry Skinner, Ken Bell) - 2:50
9. "If We Fall, We Will Fly" (Paul Overstreet, Don Schlitz) - 3:35
10. "Till It's Love Again" (Richard Leigh, Pat McManus) - 2:16

== Personnel ==
- Background Vocals: Steve Dean, Teddy Heard, James Dean Hicks, Wendy Johnson, Barbara Mandrell, Jennifer O'Brien, Keith Palmer, Randy Van Warmer, Hurshel Wiginton
- Bass Guitar: David Hungate, Jack Williams
- Drums: Eddie Bayers
- Fiddle: Rob Hajacos
- Guitar: Jimmy Capps, Mark Casstevens, Steve Gibson, Fred Newell
- Keyboards: David Briggs, Bobby Ogdin, Hargus "Pig" Robbins
- Lead Vocals: Barbara Mandrell
- Steel Guitar: Paul Franklin, Barbara Mandrell

== Sales chart positions ==
Album

Chart (1988)	Peak position
U.S. Top Country Albums	35

Singles

Year	Song	Chart positions	
Year	Song	US Country	CAN Country
1988	"I Wish That I Could Fall in Love Today"	5	—
1989	"My Train of Thought"	19	15
1989	"Mirror, Mirror"	49	56
"—" denotes releases that did not chart
