= No Nonsense (album) =

Studio album by Barbara Mandrell
- Released: August 21, 1990
- Recorded: July 1990
- Genre: Country
- Label: Capitol
- Producer: Jimmy Bowen

Barbara Mandrell chronology
Morning Sun (1990)	No Nonsense (1990)	Key's in the Mailbox (1991)

Singles from No Nonsense
- 1. "Men and Trains" Released: September 1990; 2. "I'll Leave Something Good Behind" Released: December 31, 1990; 3. "Feed the Fire" Released: May 27, 1991

Professional ratings
Review scores
Source	Rating
Allmusic	2.5/5 stars

No Nonsense is the twenty-second solo studio album by American country artist Barbara Mandrell. The album was released on August 21, 1990, on Capitol Records and was produced by Jimmy Bowen. It was Mandrell's second studio album of 1990 and her third release for the Capitol label.

== Background and content ==
No Nonsense was recorded in July 1990 and was Mandrell's second studio release of 1990. The album's musical style was mainly approached from a traditional country music style and varies from ballads to uptempo material. The opening track "Where Are the Pieces of My Heart" was one of two songs written by songwriter Hugh Prestwood, who also wrote Trisha Yearwood's "The Song Remembers When" in 1993. Prestwood also wrote "More Fun Than the Law Allows". The fifth track "I'd Rather Be Used (Than Not Needed at All)" was a duet with Barbara's sister, Louise, and was written by Louise's then-husband, R.C. Bannon. No Nonsense was released on a compact disc upon its release in 1990.. The album received two and a half out of five stars by Allmusic without a review provided.

== Release ==
No Nonsense spawned three singles between 1990 and 1991, but none of the singles charted the Billboard Magazine Hot Country Singles & Tracks chart or the Canadian RPM Country Tracks chart. The debut single "Men and Trains" was released in 1990, followed by "I'll Leave Something Good Behind" and "Feed the Fire" in 1991. No Nonsense was released August 21, 1990, and peaked for one week at #72 on the Billboard Magazine Top Country Albums chart. It became Mandrell's lowest-peaking album.

Around the time of the album's release, Mandrell was featured in a series of TV commercials and print ads for No Nonsense pantyhose, some of which were used to cross-promote the No Nonsense album.

== Track listing ==
1. "Where Are the Pieces of My Heart" (Hugh Prestwood) - 3:03
2. "Feed the Fire" (Ava Aldridge, Jan Buckingham) - 2:56
3. "Too Soon to Tell" (Mike Reid, Rory Bourke) - 2:57
4. "Straight and Narrow" (Monty Powell, Michael Noble) - 2:37
5. "I'd Rather Be Used (Than Not Needed at All)" (R.C. Bannon) - 3:53
  - duet with Louise Mandrell
6. "More Fun Than the Law Allows" (Prestwood) - 2:58
7. "You Gave It to Me" (Will Jennings, Curtis Wright) - 3:02
8. "Men and Trains" (Bannon) - 3:32
9. "We Can't Go Back" (Bannon, Gail Farrell) - 3:40
10. "I'll Leave Something Good Behind" (Hilary Kanter) - 3:38

== Personnel ==
- Eddie Bayers – drums
- Larry Byrom – guitar
- Steve Allen Davis – background vocals
- Paul Franklin – synthesizer
- Dann Huff – guitar
- John Barlow Jarvis – piano
- Barbara Mandrell – lead vocals
- Randy McCormick – synthesizer
- Michael Rhodes – bass
- Lisa Silver – background vocals
- Chris Waters – synthesizer
- Curtis Young – background vocals
- Liana Young – background vocals
- Reggie Young – guitar

== Chart positions ==
Chart (1990)	Peak position
U.S. Top Country Albums	72
