= (If Loving You Is Wrong) I Don't Want to Be Right =

Song

Single by Luther Ingram

from the album If Loving You Is Wrong I Don't Want to Be Right
- B-side: "Puttin' Game Down"
- Released: April 1972
- Genre: Soul
- Length: 3:32
- Label: KoKo
- Songwriters: Homer Banks, Carl Hampton, Raymond Jackson
- Producer: John Baylor

Luther Ingram singles chronology
"You Were Made For Me" (1972)	"(If Loving You Is Wrong) I Don't Want to Be Right" (1972)	"I'll Be Your Shelter (In Time of Storm)" (1972)

"(If Loving You Is Wrong) I Don't Want to Be Right"

Single by Millie Jackson

from the album Caught Up
- B-side: "The Rap"
- Released: December 1974
- Recorded: 1974
- Genre: Soul
- Length: 3:27 (single version); 3:56 (album version)
- Label: Spring
- Composers: Homer Banks, Carl Hampton, Raymond Jackson
- Producer: Brad Shapiro

"(If Loving You Is Wrong) I Don't Want to Be Right"

Single by Barbara Mandrell

from the album Moods
- B-side: "I Feel the Hurt Coming On"
- Released: February 17, 1979
- Recorded: c. 1978
- Genre: Country
- Length: 3:05
- Label: ABC
- Songwriters: Homer Banks, Carl Hampton, Raymond Jackson
- Producer: Tom Collins

Barbara Mandrell singles chronology
"Sleeping Single in a Double Bed" (1978)	"(If Loving You Is Wrong) I Don't Want to Be Right" (1979)	"Fooled by a Feeling" (1979)

"(If Loving You Is Wrong) I Don't Want to Be Right" is a song written by Stax Records songwriters Homer Banks, Carl Hampton, and Raymond Jackson. Originally written for the Emotions, it has been performed by many singers, most notably by Luther Ingram, whose original recording topped the R&B chart for four weeks and rose to number 3 on the Billboard Hot 100 in 1972. Billboard ranked it as the No. 16 song for 1972.

In 1972–73, the Faces recorded the song as an outtake for Ooh La La (1973), its final studio album. In 1974, Millie Jackson released her version of the song, which received two Grammy Award nominations. In 1979, Barbara Mandrell's version topped the U.S. country chart, reached number 31 on the Billboard Hot 100 (number 27 Cashbox), and was nominated for Single of the Year at the 1979 CMA (Country Music Association) Awards. Rod Stewart recorded the song for Foot Loose & Fancy Free (1977), his eighth album; as a single it peaked at number 23 on the UK Singles Chart in 1980.

== Content ==
The song is about an adulterous love affair, told from the point of view of either the mistress or the cheating husband, depending on the gender of the performer. In both cases, the singer expresses their desire to maintain the affair while acknowledging that the relationship is immoral.

Millie Jackson took a different approach. On both studio and live recordings, her version is divided into three parts: "(If Loving You Is Wrong) I Don't Want to Be Right", "The Rap", and "(If Loving You Is Wrong) I Don't Want to Be Right (Reprise)", which have a combined running time of over 11 minutes. The first and third parts have the song as originally written, while the middle part was written by Jackson. Titled "The Rap", the middle segment is a monologue in which an unrepentant Jackson discusses her status as the "other woman" and why she loves it.

== Other versions ==
The song was first recorded by the Emotions (but its version has never been released), and by Veda Brown, whose version was finally released in 2008. Other notable singers to cover it include country singer Jackie Burns (whose version made the Hot Country Songs chart in 1972), Isaac Hayes, Millie Jackson, Rod Stewart, Percy Sledge, Bobby "Blue" Bland, David Ruffin, Barbara Mason, LeAnn Rimes, Renée Geyer, Ramsey Lewis, jazz chanteuse Della Reese; reggae singers Alton Ellis, George Faith and Glen Washington; Tom Jones, Cassandra Wilson, Nathan Cavaleri, Rania Zeriri, Barbara Mandrell, and Johanne Desforges (French cover titled "Si je ne peux t'aimer a quoi bon exister").

In 2020, electronic musician Nicolas Jaar (under his moniker Against All Logic) released his own version called "If Loving You Is Wrong" from his second album 2017-2019, which heavily samples Ingram's version, notably the chorus.

The song is sampled in Travis Scott, Young Thug, and Rich Homie Quan's song "Mamacita", and Pusha T and Kendrick Lamar's song "Nosetalgia".

== Chart performances ==
=== Luther Ingram ===
Chart (1972)	Peak Position
US Billboard Hot 100	3
US Best Selling Soul Singles (Billboard)	1

=== Jackie Burns ===
Chart (1972)	Peak Position
US Billboard Hot Country Singles	71

=== Millie Jackson ===
Chart (1975)	Peak Position
US Billboard Hot 100	42
US Hot Soul Singles (Billboard)	42

=== Barbara Mandrell ===
Chart (1979)	Peak Position
US Billboard Hot 100	31
US Hot Country Songs (Billboard)	1
US Billboard Adult Contemporary	6

==== Year-end charts ====
Chart (1979)	Position
US Hot Country Songs (Billboard)	19

=== Rhonda Clark ===
Chart (1992)	Peak Position
US Hot R&B Singles (Billboard)	6

== See also ==
Other songs with adulterous themes:

- "Me and Mrs Jones"
- "Somebody Else's Guy"
