= He Set My Life to Music =

Studio album by Barbara Mandrell
- Released: September 6, 1982
- Recorded: May 1982
- Studio: Woodland (Nashville, Tennessee); except "Through It All" at Weddington Studios, North Hollywood, California
- Genre: Gospel, Inspirational
- Length: 36:29
- Label: MCA
- Producer: Tom Collins

Barbara Mandrell chronology
...In Black & White (1982)	He Set My Life to Music (1982)	Spun Gold (1983)

Professional ratings
Review scores
Source	Rating
AllMusic	3/5 stars

He Set My Life to Music is the twelfth solo studio album by American country music artist, Barbara Mandrell. It was released in September 1982 on MCA Records and was produced by Tom Collins. The album was Mandrell's second studio album of the year and her first recording of Inspirational music.

== Background and content ==
As described by Bill Carpenter of AllMusic, He Set My Life to Music is a "contemporary gospel album." The album contains 10 tracks of mainly cover versions of a series of gospel and inspirational standards. It includes covers of songs such as "What a Friend We Have in Jesus", "Swing Low, Sweet Chariot", and Dottie Rambo's "I Will Glory in the Cross". The album included four duets with mainly Gospel artists. "What a Friend We Have in Jesus" was recorded with B.J. Thomas, "I Turn to Him" with The Blackwood Brothers, "I Will Glory in the Cross" with Dottie Rambo, and "Through It All" with Andrae Crouch.

== Release ==
The album was re-released many years later under the Universal Special Products. Carpenter gave the album three out of five stars. He Set My Life to Music reached number 59 on the Billboard Top Country Albums chart, and did not spawn any singles. For her performance, Mandrell won the Grammy Award for Best Inspirational Performance in 1983. The album also won Mandrell an award for "Album by a Secular Artist" at the 1983 Dove Awards.

The album was released on an LP, with five songs on each side of the record. The album was also released on compact disc in 1991.

== Track listing ==
Side one

1. "What a Friend We Have in Jesus", (Charles Converse, Joseph Scriven),
  featuring, adapted and arranged by B.J. Thomas 3:24
2. "Swing Low, Sweet Chariot" (Wallace Willis; adapted and arranged by
  Barbara Mandrell and Tom Collins), featuring the Mt. Pisgah Methodist Church Choir 2:55
3. "I Turn to Him", (W.T. Davidson), with The Blackwood Brothers 3:14
4. "I Will Glory in the Cross" (Dottie Rambo), with Dottie Rambo 4:14
5. "Through It All" (Andrae Crouch), with Andrae Crouch 3:31

Side two

1. "He Set My Life to Music", (Kye Fleming, Dennis Morgan) 4:36
2. "He Grew the Tree", (Chuck Lawrence) 3:56
3. "Out of the Mouths of Babes" (Adapted and arranged by Barbara Mandrell and Tom Collins),
  with the Children's Choir From Hendersonville Chapel – 2:22
4. "I'm Yours, Lord", (Gary Chapman) 2:27
5. "Then, Now, and Forever", (Adapted and arranged by Barbara Mandrell and Tom Collins) – 5:50

== Personnel ==
- Guitar: Pete Bordonali, Jimmy Capps, Hadley Hockensmith, Fred Newell, David Williams, Shannon Williams
- Bass: Nathan East, Michael Leech, Joe Osborn
- Keyboards: David Briggs, David Huntsinger, Shane Keister, Bobby Ogdin, Michael Omartian, Gary Smith
- Drums: Bill Maxwell, Buster Phillips
- Percussion: Charlie McCoy, Farrell Morris
- Strings: The Nashville String Machine, Bergen White
- Backing Vocals: Tom Brannon, Sheri Huffman, Gene Miller, Perry Morgan, Louis Nunley, Lisa Silver,
  Diane Tidwell, Bergen White, Hurshel Wiginton

== Chart positions ==
Chart (1982)	Peak position
U.S. Top Country Albums	59
