= Sleeping Single in a Double Bed =

Single by Barbara Mandrell

from the album Moods
- B-side: "Just One More of Your Goodbyes"
- Released: August 1, 1978
- Recorded: 1978
- Genre: Country
- Length: 2:20
- Label: ABC
- Songwriter(s): Kye Fleming; Dennis Morgan
- Producer(s): Tom Collins

Barbara Mandrell singles chronology
"Tonight" (1978)	"Sleeping Single in a Double Bed" (1978)	"(If Loving You Is Wrong) I Don't Want to Be Right" (1979)

"Sleeping Single In a Double Bed" is a song written by Kye Fleming and Dennis Morgan, and recorded by American country music artist Barbara Mandrell. It was released in August 1978 as the first single from her album Moods.

== Tracklist ==
Dave Aude Remix

1. "Sleeping Single In a Double Bed" (Dave Aude Remix) - 3:20

== Charts ==
The song was Mandrell's twentieth solo hit on Billboard magazine's Hot Country Singles and her first of six #1 singles on that chart. The single stayed at the top for three weeks (November 1978) and spent a total of eleven weeks in the top 40.

=== Weekly charts ===
Chart (1978–1979)	Peak position
US Hot Country Songs (Billboard)	1
US Bubbling Under Hot 100 Singles (Billboard)	2
Canadian RPM Country Tracks	1
Chart (1979)	Peak position
Australia (Kent Music Report)	85

=== Year-end charts ===
Chart (1979)	Position
US Hot Country Songs (Billboard)	9

== Awards ==
In early 1980, the song won an American Music Award for Favorite Country Single
