= Barbara Mandrell =

American country music singer (born 1948)

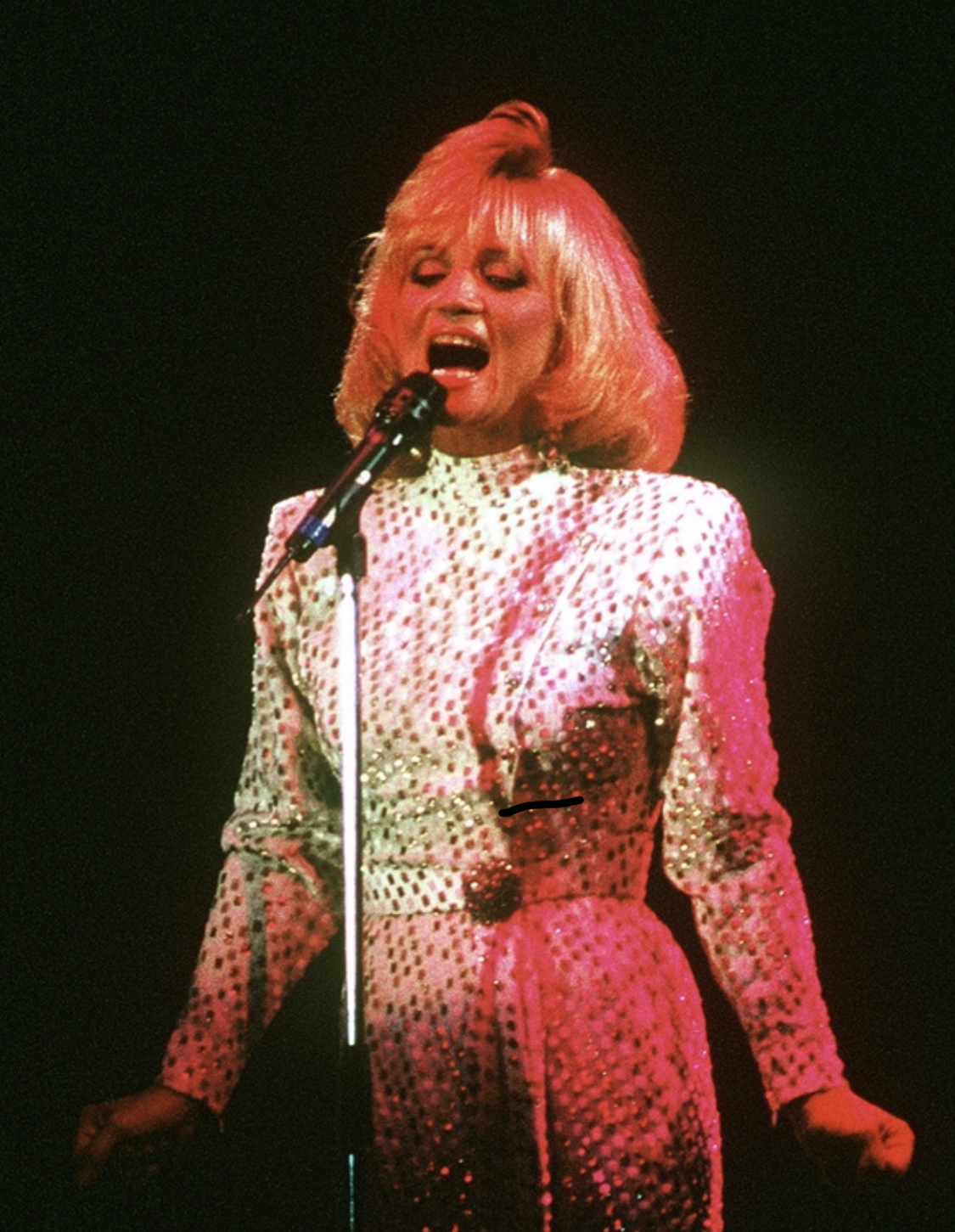
- Mandrell in 1991
- Born: Barbara Ann Mandrell; December 25, 1948 (age 77); Houston, Texas, U.S.
- Occupations: Musician; singer; actress; author
- Years active: 1960–2000
- Spouse: Ken Dudney (m. 1967)
- Children: 3
- Relatives: Louise Mandrell (sister); Irlene Mandrell (sister)
- Musical career
- Genres: Country; R&B; soul; country pop; gospel
- Instruments: Vocals; guitar; bass; saxophone; accordion; mandolin
- Labels: Columbia; ABC–Dot; MCA; EMI; Capitol–Liberty; Direct; Razor & Tie
- Website: barbaramandrell.com

Barbara Ann Mandrell (born December 25, 1948) is an American retired country music singer and musician. She is also credited as an actress and author. During the late 1970s and early 1980s, she was considered among country's most successful music artists. She had six number-one singles and 25 top-10 singles reach the Billboard country songs chart. She also hosted her own primetime television show in the early 1980s that featured music, dance numbers, and comedy sketches. Mandrell also played a variety of musical instruments during her career that helped earn her a series of major industry awards.

Mandrell was born in Texas and raised mostly in California. From a musical family, she played several instruments by the time she was a teenager. Her skills on the steel guitar were noticed by country music entertainers, who gave Mandrell the chance to perform in public at age 13. During this time, she became a regular on the television program Town Hall Party. She also performed as a musician when she toured in shows featuring Johnny Cash and Patsy Cline. Her family formed a band in her late teens, who traveled overseas and entertained military bases. After marrying in 1967, Mandrell briefly retired, but was inspired to pursue a singing career after watching a performance of the Grand Ole Opry live at the Ryman Auditorium. In 1969, she signed her first recording contract with Columbia Records. She became a member of the Grand Ole Opry in 1972.

In the early 1970s, Mandrell recorded a number of singles that combined country influences with rhythm and blues-soul. Her singles frequently made their way onto the country charts. Her most successful singles of this period were "Tonight My Baby's Coming Home" (1971) and "The Midnight Oil" (1973). In 1975, she moved to ABC-Dot Records and reached her commercial breakthrough with country–pop singles such as "Sleeping Single in a Double Bed" (1978), "(If Loving You Is Wrong) I Don't Want to Be Right" (1979), "I Was Country When Country Wasn't Cool" (1981), and "One of a Kind Pair of Fools" (1983). She became a concert headliner and won several major music awards, including the Entertainer of the Year accolade from the Country Music Association two years in a row.

Mandrell sustained serious head and leg injuries in a near-fatal car accident on September 11, 1984. She seriously considered retirement for a time. She returned to recording, though, in 1985 and had several more top-10 country singles, including "Fast Lanes and Country Roads" (1985), "No One Mends a Broken Heart Like You" (1986), and "I Wish I Could Fall in Love Today" (1988). She resumed performing and touring and began guest-starring in several television shows and numerous commercials during the late 1980s and 1990s, such as Burning Rage and Empty Nest. She continued recording into the 1990s, releasing several albums for the Capitol label, including No Nonsense (1990). In 1997, Mandrell announced her retirement from performing and recording. She continued acting until 2000. In 2009, she was inducted into the Country Music Hall of Fame for her work in the industry.

== Early childhood ==
Mandrell was born in Houston, Texas, on Christmas Day, 1948. She is the eldest child born to parents Mary Ellen (née McGill; born 1931) and Irby Matthew Mandrell (October 11, 1924 – March 5, 2009). The family later moved to Corpus Christi, Texas, where her father was a police officer and her mother was a music teacher. Mandrell's younger sisters, Louise and Irlene, were born there. While in Corpus Christi, Mandrell got acquainted with music, singing and playing instruments regularly at home. She also recalled having a natural ear for hearing music. "I remember once I was at my cousins' home in Falfurrias. We were playing outside—and I'm talking this is when I'm a little girl—and we were singing, of all things, 'I've Been Working on the Railroad'. All of a sudden, I started to hear harmony. I began to sing it, and I just thought, 'This is the neatest thing in the world'," she told Texas Monthly.

In her early childhood, she began performing publicly. Her first recollection of performing in front people was at her family's church, singing a rendition of the "Gospel Boogie". In addition to singing, Mandrell also learned several instruments as a small child. Mandrell's mother taught her how to play the accordion and read music before she entered first grade. When she was six years old, the family moved to Oceanside, California. Irby Mandrell opened his own music store. In her elementary-school years, she learned to play saxophone while a part of the school band. During the same period, she started taking lessons on the steel guitar from her father's friend Norman Hamlet. After a year of practice on the instrument, Irby Mandrell took his daughter to a music trade show in Chicago, Illinois. At the program, she performed on the steel guitar. She was heard by country performer Joe Maphis, who would help launch Mandrell's early career as a musician.

== Music career ==
=== 1960–1968: Late childhood and teenaged years as a steel guitarist ===
In 1960, Joe Maphis brought 11-year-old Mandrell onto his country music show in Las Vegas, Nevada. As part of Maphis's act, she performed the steel guitar. Maphis also helped her secure a regular spot on the country music California television program Town Hall Party. Feeling as if she was the only female musician, Mandrell discovered on Town Hall Party that other female instrumentalists also existed: "Men dominated the world of country music, but I looked around and discovered there were more women than you might have thought." On summers off from school, Mandrell routinely went back to Las Vegas to perform. In 1962, she toured country music shows with artists Johnny Cash and Patsy Cline. During the tour, 13-year old Mandrell shared hotel rooms with Cline, since she was underaged. She also performed steel guitar for Red Foley, Little Jimmy Dickens, and Tex Ritter.

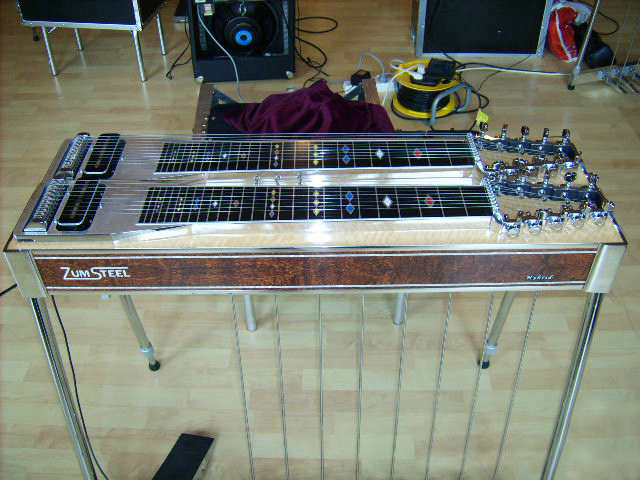
As a teenager, Mandrell became skilled at the steel guitar and often played background for several country music artists.

When she turned 14, her parents formed the Mandrell Family Band with Barbara on steel guitar, mother Mary on piano, and father Irby on lead vocals. They also hired two outside musicians, including drummer Ken Dudney, whom Mandrell later married in 1967. The Mandrell Family Band mostly played military bases around the United States and performed a variety of music, including songs by the Beatles. While in the band, Mandrell also learned how to play banjo and bass guitar. She also engaged in other activities during her teenaged years. In 1965, she was voted "Miss Oceanside California". She participated in the marching band, chorus, and student council. She graduated from high school in 1967.

Shortly after her graduation, Mandrell married Ken Dudney and chose to retire from performing to become a full-time housewife. Her last performance trip was to Vietnam, where the Mandrell Family Band entertained the troops fighting in the Vietnam War. Upon returning, Mandrell found out that her husband had been sent temporarily overseas for his Navy pilot career. Feeling alone, Mandrell visited with her parents who had just moved to Nashville, Tennessee. There, the family attended a performance at the Grand Ole Opry. While watching the show that evening, Mandrell realized that she still wanted to perform. "I wasn't cut out to be in the audience," she recalled in 2003. With father Irby acting as her manager, she got the chance to play steel guitar on a show located in the Printer's Alley section of Nashville. In addition to the steel guitar, Mandrell also sang on several selections in the show. Her skills as both a singer and musician caught the attention of six different record companies, which offered her a recording contract. This included country music producer Billy Sherrill, who was watching the performance. In 1969, Mandrell signed with Sherill's label Columbia Records as a recording artist.

=== 1969–1974: Singing transition and early success at Columbia Records ===
Mandrell started her singing career by cutting covers of rhythm and blues–soul (R&B-soul) selections. Her first Columbia single made America's Billboard Hot Country Songs chart in 1969 called "I've Been Loving You Too Long (To Stop Now)". It was a cover of the Otis Redding original. It was followed by the Billy Sherrill-penned "Playin' Around with Love" (1970). It became her first song to reach the top 20, peaking at number 18 on the Billboard country chart. Her next singles were covers of Aretha Franklin's "Do Right Woman, Do Right Man" and Roy Head's "Treat Him Right". In 1971, Mandrell's debut studio album was released through Columbia, also titled Treat Him Right. The disc included her charting singles between 1969 and 1971, along with covers of songs by Ivory Joe Hunter, Joe South, and others. Her early success garnered Mandrell the Top New Female Vocalist award from the Academy of Country Music in 1970 and a membership to the Grand Ole Opry in 1972.

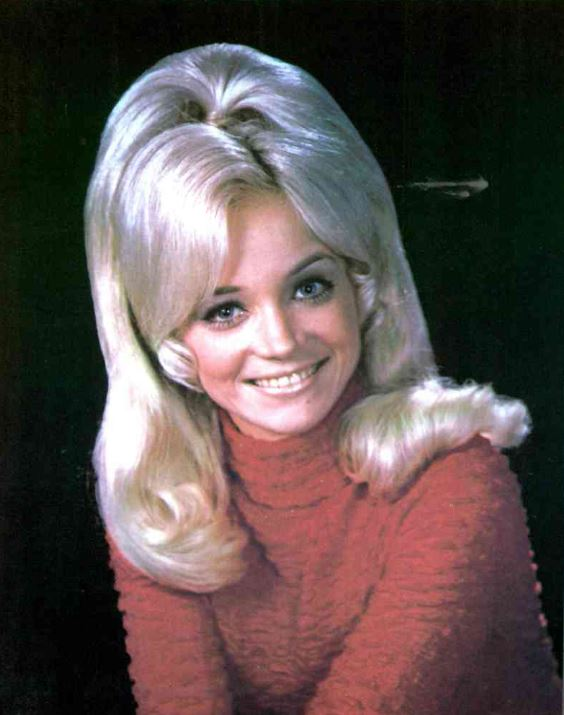
Barbara Mandrell, 1974.

In 1971, Mandrell's single "Tonight My Baby's Coming Home" was her first to peak in the top 10 of the Billboard country songs chart. It was followed in 1972 by a cover of Joe Tex's "Show Me", which made the top 20 on the same chart. At the same time, Mandrell started recording with country singer David Houston. Several of their recordings were released as singles and made the country charts in the United States and Canada. Their first single, "After Closing Time", reached number six on the Billboard country survey and number four on Canada's RPM country songs list. Their duets made the charts several more times between 1970 and 1974, including "I Love You, I Love You" (1973), which climbed into the Billboard top 10, as well. Their recordings were released on a studio album titled A Perfect Match.

Critics and writers took notice of Mandrell's fusion of country music with R&B-soul. Author Kurt Wolff of Country Music: The Rough Guide described her early chart records as "colorful, spirited country soul". Wolff further explained, "The songs weren't exactly all roots and downhome twang, but they were certainly closer to the ground (and the soul) than any of her later, more suburban material." Mary A. Bufwack and Robert K. Oermann highlighted Mandrell's country–soul mix in their 2003 book: "[Mandrell's delivery] gives her vocals a hoarse, urgent quality that she put to good use on 'blue-eyed soul' versions of R&B songs," they noted.

In reviewing a Columbia compilation, AllMusic's Greg Adams stated that her early work was "some of the best recordings [Barbara Mandrell] ever made." Some critics found that Mandrell's Columbia material lacked individuality and at times seemed closer resemble that of other Columbia artists. "Sometimes, it seems as if Sherrill isn't quite sure what to do with Mandrell. He keeps her away from anything that could be construed as a good fit for Tammy Wynette, and when the country does turn toward the straight-ahead, it's still soft; Merle Haggard's 'Today I Started Loving You Again' doesn't carry resignation in Barbara's hands, only reassurance," Stephen Thomas Erlewine commented on one of her early LP's.

In 1973, Columbia issued what was considered Mandrell's breakthrough record, called "The Midnight Oil". The song told the story of a wife having an affair and lying to her husband about the situation. The single became her second solo top-10 hit, reaching number seven on the Billboard country chart and number five on the RPM country chart. Its corresponding studio album of the same name reached the number eight position on the Billboard country LPs chart. In 1974, she reached the top 20 on the country chart with "This Time I Almost Made It", which followed a similar country–soul style as her previous material. Mandrell later reflected to Biography about the lack of confidence she felt showcased her Columbia material: "There have been many times when I thought other people might be better singers or better musicians or prettier than me, but then I would hear Daddy's voice telling me to never say never, and I would find a way to squeeze an extra inch or two out of what God had given me." In 1975, she left Columbia's roster.

=== 1975–1986: Country–pop crossover and career peak ===
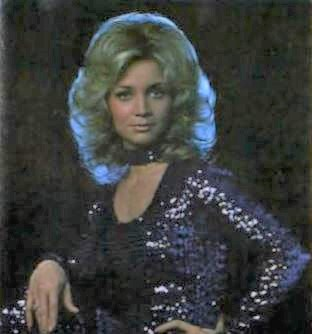
Barbara Mandrell in Billboard magazine, 1977.

In 1975, Mandrell signed a recording contract with ABC–Dot Records (which was later bought by MCA Records). With producer Tom Collins, Mandrell incorporated a pop production that broadened her appeal with listeners. Her first ABC–Dot single was 1975's "Standing Room Only", which was her first top-five Billboard country song. It was followed by the top-20 songs "That's What Friends Are For" and "Midnight Angel". Collins also incorporated R&B elements into her repertoire, which further elevated her commercial success. Her R&B covers of Denise LaSalle's "Married But Not to Each Other" and Shirley Brown's "Woman to Woman" made the American and Canadian country song top five in 1977. "Woman to Woman" was also her first enter the Billboard Hot 100. These recordings appeared on her sixth and seventh studio albums, which were also issued in 1977.

Mandrell reached her commercial zenith in the late 1970s with songs about infidelity and cheating. In 1978, "Sleeping Single in a Double Bed" was her first single to reach the number-one spot on the Billboard and RPM country charts. It was followed in 1979 by a cover of Luther Ingram's R&B hit "(If Loving You Is Wrong) I Don't Want to Be Right". It also topped the North American country charts and crossed over into the top 40 of the Billboard Hot 100 and Canadian pop songs chart. On Billboard's adult contemporary survey, the single reached the top ten. Both tracks appeared on Mandrell's top-10 Billboard country album Moods (1978). Her 1979 album Just for the Record was also a top-10 Billboard LP. Just for the Record spawned the country–pop crossover singles "Fooled by a Feeling" and "Years".

Now at her career peak, Mandrell became a headlining concert act. Her concert productions included choreography and costume changes and featured Mandrell on multiple musical instruments. One of her headlining performances was turned into a cable television special called The Lady Is a Champ. She also appeared on national television programs and won the Country Music Association's 1979 Female Vocalist of the Year accolade. Between 1980 and 1982, her siblings and she co-hosted the NBC television series Barbara Mandrell and the Mandrell Sisters. It helped Mandrell become the first performer to win back–to–back Entertainer of the Year awards from the Country Music Association in both 1980 and 1981. Mandrell's recordings continued having commercial success too. She had top-10 country singles with 1980's "Crackers" and "The Best of Strangers". In 1981, MCA issued her first live album, which charted the Billboard country albums top five and certified gold in sales from the United States. The disc included a track about staying close to country roots called "I Was Country When Country Wasn't Cool". Released as a single, it was her fourth number-one song on the Billboard country chart.

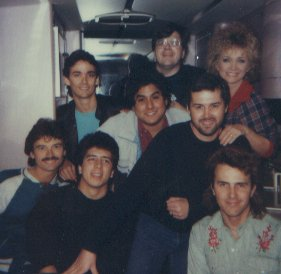
Mandrell (upper right) on tour with her band, 1986

Mandrell's commercial momentum continued through the early 1980s. Her 12th studio album ...In Black & White reached number seven on the country albums list. It was followed by her 14th studio record Spun Gold (1983), which climbed to number five on the same list. Both discs spawned the number-one singles "'Till You're Gone" and "One of a Kind Pair of Fools". Also included were the top-10 recordings "Operator, Long Distance Please" and "In Times Like These". Mandrell's 1984 album was also a top ten Billboard disc and featured the top-five singles "Only a Lonely Heart Knows" and "Happy Birthday Dear Heartache". Mandrell's popularity allowed her to record an album of gospel music in 1982 titled He Set My Life to Music. The project brought Mandrell her first Grammy awards. She also collaborated on several duets with Lee Greenwood in 1984. The duets were issued on their 1984 studio album Meant for Each Other, which featured the top five country single "To Me".

Despite her popularity and commercial appeal, Mandrell's early–1980s music received mixed reviews. Writer Kurt Wolff found that her 1980s recordings exemplified "a weak attempt to maintain her roots" featuring "garnish productions" that went "head-first into schmaltz". In reviewing her 1983 album, critic Greg Adams commented, "Spun Gold contains some bizarre collisions of country music's traditional working-class perspective with disco-era glitz." Meanwhile, writers Mary A. Bufwack and Robert K. Oermann described her early 1980s singles as "powerful heartache songs" whose themes centered around "enduring financial hardship" and "proud-to-be country anthem[s]".

On September 11, 1984, Mandrell and her two oldest children were in Tennessee heading home from shopping when another driver crossed the center line and hit them head on. Mandrell suffered a broken femur, shattered ankle, injured knee, and a concussion that left temporary brain damage. The driver of the other vehicle died. Mandrell's children survived with minor injuries. The crash caused Mandrell to endure numerous surgeries on her femur and ankle. This led to prolonged pain and depression. "I never thought I would ever sing again or be Barbara Mandrell again, or any of that," she later told CNN. She eventually returned to the recording studio in May 1985, which resulted in the 1985 top-10 country single "There's No Love in Tennessee". It appeared on Mandrell's Greatest Hits compilation, which was also issued in 1985. She returned to the stage for the first time in 1986 at the Los Angeles Universal Amphitheatre, with Dolly Parton serving as her opening act. Her next studio album Get to the Heart (1985) spawned the top-10 Billboard songs "Fast Lanes and Country Roads" and "Angel in Your Arms". Her final album for MCA appeared in 1986 titled Moments. It spawned the top-10 country song "No One Mends a Broken Heart Like You".

=== 1987–1997: Later recordings, career slow–down, and retirement ===
In 1987, Mandrell signed a new recording contract with EMI America. Her first album with the label was the studio offering Sure Feels Good (1987). The disc reached number 24 on the Billboard country albums survey. United Press International positively commented, "Mandrell should be proud of this effort, which should put her back on top of the charts." Yet, of its three singles only "Child Support" reached the top 20 of the North American country charts. Mandrell's future singles and albums reached progressively lower chart positions as a new group of traditionally oriented country artists began having more commercial success. Yet, Mandrell continued touring and remained a popular concert attraction through the 1980s and 1990s.

Mandrell signed with Capitol Records in late 1987. Her first Capitol single was a cover of Ray Price's "I Wish I Could Fall in Love Today", which reached the top five of the American and Canadian singles charts. It was included on her 19th studio disc I'll Be Your Jukebox Tonight (1988). The project featured a traditional country sound and included production credits for the first time from Fred Foster. It also spawned the top-20 single "My Train of Thought" (1989) and the charting song "Mirror, Mirror". Both songs were her final singles to chart in the United States. Mandrell remained with Capitol until 1991. Her next two Capitol discs were both issued in 1990: Morning Sun and No Nonsense (distributed through Liberty). For the latter album, Mandrell signed a commercial deal with the No Nonsense panty hose brand. Her final Capitol–Liberty project was issued in 1991 called Key's in the Mailbox. Mandrell's Capitol recordings found positive reviews from critics. Mary A. Bufwack and Robert K. Oermann found the songs to showcase "strong female lyrics", while Bill Carpenter said her 1991 album exemplified "Heartful soul and contemporary country."

Mandrell continued performing live on network television and remained a popular act on the Grand Ole Opry, including the televised portion of the program. Mandrell also continued recording and releasing new material. In 1994, the New York label Direct Records released two albums of her music. The studio album projects were marketed exclusively through television and appeared on networks such as TNN. That year, the label issued Acoustic Attitude, which was an album of re-recordings. The label also issued an album of new material that year titled It Works for Me. The album was reissued on Razor & Tie in 1997, with which Mandrell temporarily signed a contract that year.

Also in 1997, Mandrell announced her retirement from touring, recording, and performing. In an interview with Billboard, Mandrell explained that she chose to retire so she could focus on a full–time acting career. She gave her final musical performance in October 1997 at the Grand Ole Opry house. Her final concert was aired on network television. Titled Barbara Mandrell and the Do-Rites: The Last Dance, premiered on TNN in late 1997. After her retirement, Mandrell sold all of her musical instruments. She now spends time on her family and domestic responsibilities.

== Acting career ==
=== 1978–1983: Early roles and television variety series ===
Mandrell began gaining regular exposure on national television programs. Her television credits from this period included appearances on The Tonight Show, American Bandstand, and Bob Hope entertainment specials. Among the highlights was an appearance on a 1979 episode of The Rockford Files and co-hosting the 1979 Academy of Country Music Awards. In late 1979, she played Emmy in the holiday program Skinflint: A Christmas Carol alongside several other country artists of the era. The special was a Southern American take on the original story of the same name. Fred Guida gave the program a negative review in his book A Christmas Carol and Its Adaptations: "Unfortunately, Skinflint fails to live up to its interesting premise, and the result is one of the lamest Carol variations to date."

Mandrell was given several offers from the NBC network to host her own syndicated show, but she routinely turned the offers down. One day, NBC producer Marty Krofft was shown a wallet-sized photograph of Mandrell and her sisters playing different musical instruments. This prompted Krofft to contact Mandrell about offering her a program that she could co–host with her sisters. From his encouragement, she eventually agreed to host a show on his network. In 1980, she was signed by NBC to host a national television variety series. Titled Barbara Mandrell & the Mandrell Sisters, the show was hosted by Mandrell along with her sisters Irlene and Louise.

Mandrell learned choreography for the show and was routinely featured playing multiple musical instruments. In addition, the Mandrell sisters performed a series of comedy sketches. In their book The Complete Directory to Prime Time Network and Cable TV Shows, authors Tim Brooks and Earle F. Marsh noted that Barbara often portrayed the "serious, pushy sister", while Irlene was portrayed as the "sexy, vain one". Mandrell often had to push back against NBC executives, who insisted that the show feature hay barrels and other features of traditional country-western shows. "They expect you to be barefoot and ignorant," Mandrell commented in 2003. During its peak, the show attracted an estimated 40 million viewers per week. For her work, Mandrell was nominated for Best Actress in a Television Musical or Comedy Series by the Golden Globe Awards.

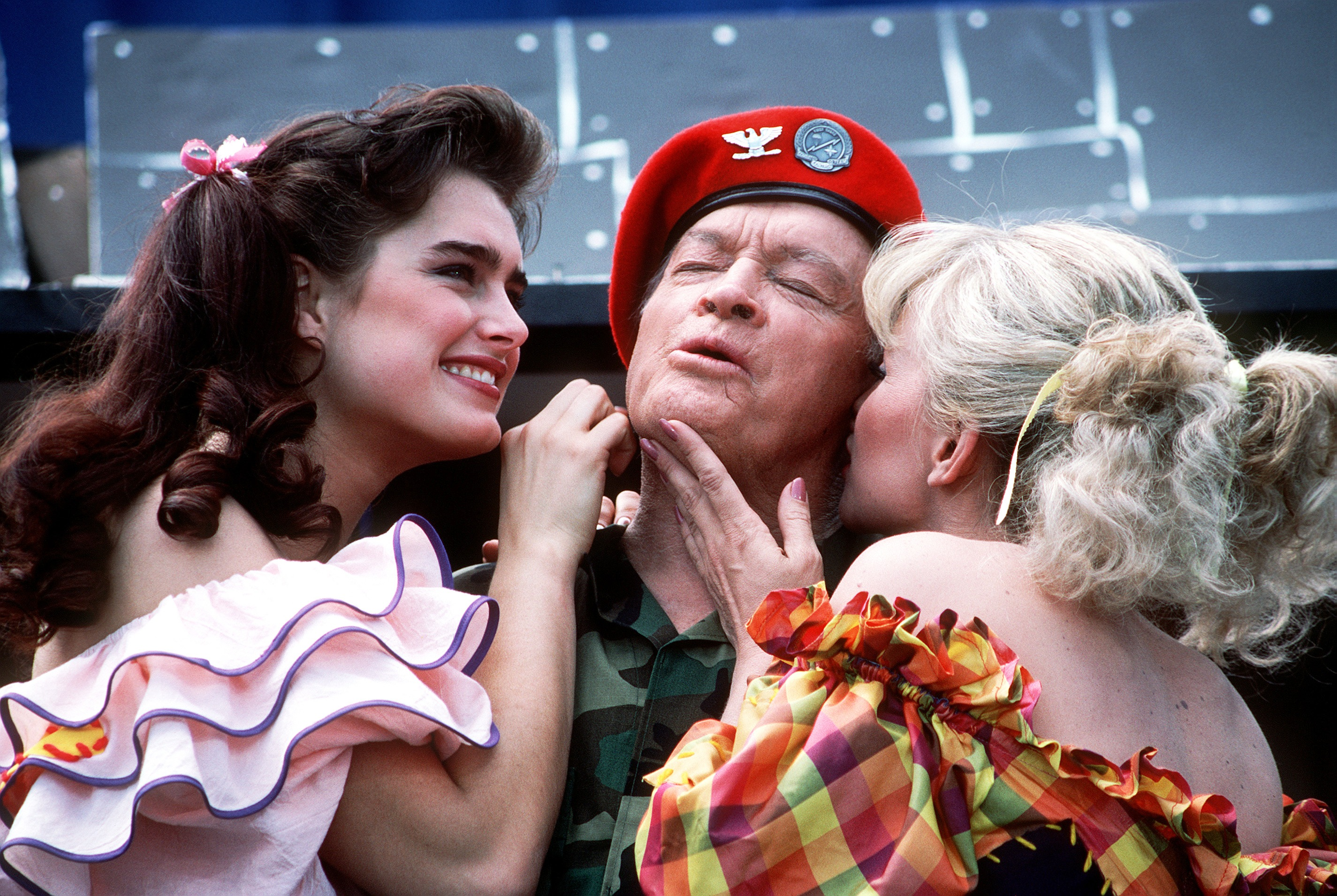
Mandrell continued entertaining into the late 1980s. Here, she appears with Bob Hope (center) and Brooke Shields (left) for a military engagement (1987).

Despite the NBC show's success, the constant workload (along with a focus on her music career) caused Mandrell to suffer from burnout. She often had to take extra naps on her tour bus parked next to the television studio. She also had to take cortisone shots before show tapings so that her vocal chords had less strain. She was urged to quit the show by physicians, who warned that she would ultimately suffer from permanent vocal damage. In 1982, Mandrell announced the program would end after a two-year run on NBC. "I'm the only person that I know of that has ever left a television series with a five-year contract," she later commented.

=== 1984–2000: Later television roles ===
Mandrell continued acting following her show's cancellation. In 1984, Mandrell debuted in her first television film titled Burning Rage. Mandrell played the main role of a geologist who investigates coal-mining fires underneath a town in Tennessee. Joe Brown of The Washington Post called the film, "an overheated title for what amounts to a lukewarm drama about a natural phenomenon and its effect on a small town." He concluded by commenting on Mandrell's acting performance: "As an actress, Mandrell is likable and natural, but she has little to do here but walk around looking concerned when she's not getting into tepid clinches with [Tom] Wopat". Following her 1984 car crash, a television special of Mandrell's was aired on CBS titled Barbara Mandrell–Something Special.

She also made appearances on talk shows and network programs during the late 1980s and early 1990s. She also was featured in several television commercials for food products. In the early 1990s, she portrayed a character on the television show Empty Nest. In 1994, Mandrell played a villain guest role in an episode of ABC's The Commish. The Baltimore Sun described her as playing "a less sympathetic role than usual" in their description of the episode.

During the mid-1990s, Mandrell also played roles on the shows Touched by an Angel, Dr. Quinn Medicine Woman, and Baywatch. In 1997, Mandrell gave up her music career to focus on acting full-time. She signed with the Creative Artists Agency, which helped her acquire more television roles. She appeared as a recurring character in the soap opera Sunset Beach. In 1999, Mandrell played the mother of a deceased son, who finds conflict with his "controlling girlfriend". Titled The Wrong Girl, the television filmed aired on NBC that year. Among Mandrell's final acting credits was 2000's made-for-television film Stolen from the Heart.

== Artistry ==
=== Musicianship ===
In addition to singing, Mandrell is also known for playing multiple instruments. In her teenaged years, she was nicknamed "The Princess of Steel" for being a skillful steel guitar player. In a 2006 interview with CMT, Mandrell explained that she is "proficient" on the steel guitar, alto saxophone, dobro, five-string banjo, and bass. She also said that she can play the guitar and mandolin "if necessary". PBS described Mandrell as "a true prodigy" in reference to her musicianship. News & Record found that Mandrell's musicianship can also be found in her live shows: "Those hours are packed with aerobics, as Mandrell dances and prances across the stage, playing several musical instruments and clowning with her Do-Rites band." In reviewing a concert, The Morning Call explained, "No Mandrell show would be complete without a demonstration of the singer's musical virtuosity. Playing a mean saxophone and banjo during the course of the evening, Mandrell proved herself to be a talented musician."

=== Musical styles ===
Mandrell's musical style embeds country music with country–pop, R&B–soul, and gospel. Jason Ankeny of AllMusic found that the most popular era of her career (late 1970s and early 1980s) had a "glitzier, more pop-influenced" sound. Kurt Wolff highlighted a similar theme in his book Country Music: The Rough Guide: "[Tom] Collins churned out frightfully slick and garnish productions, but Mandrell thrived in her new environment." Hunter Kelly of Rolling Stone explained that when Mandrell began incorporating R&B sounds into her style that her career "really kicked into overdrive". Mandrell further explained her reasoning behind incorporating R&B: "To me, country music and R&B music have a lot of similarities, but the one thing that I think is the most important is both genres, just straight ahead, they're telling you. They're not making up a story just because it rhymes nicely."

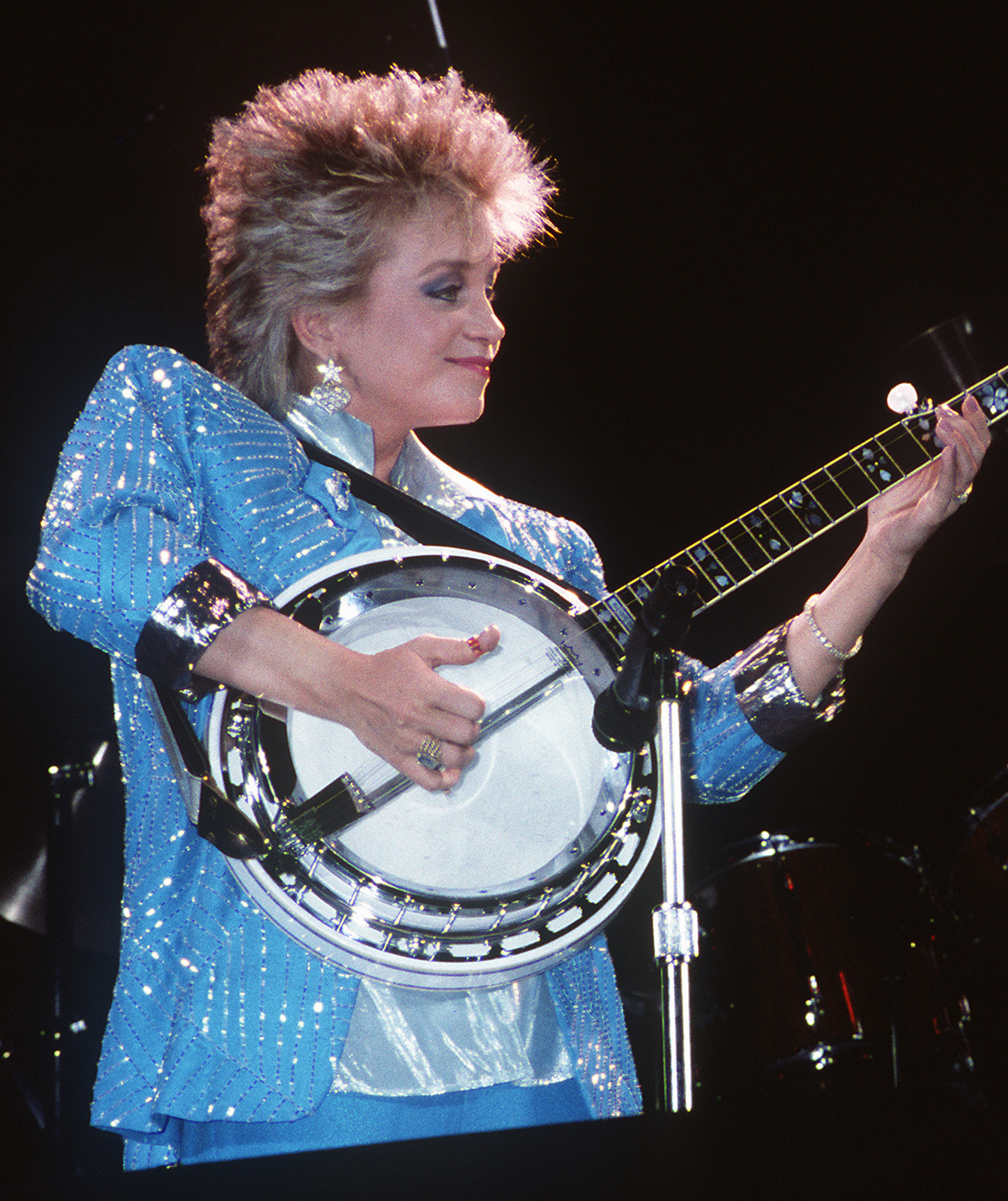
Mandrell was known for playing multiple musical instruments in her live shows. Here, she is seen playing the banjo, 1986.

Writers found that Mandrell had her greatest commercial success with songs that incorporated subjects of cheating. Mary A. Bufwack and Robert K. Oermann found this to be especially evident after she transitioned to her second record label: "Barbara continued to smolder in sin after moving to the ABC/MCA Records fold in 1975." Kurt Wolff found a similar theme with cheating material: "The subjects of many of Mandrell's songs were also racy for the time, dealing openly with such topics as lust, sexual loneliness, and late night-night love trysts." Wolff further commented, "What's ironic about her subject matter is that Mandrell herself–a devout Christian, mother, and wife– always maintained an impeccably clean, family–oriented profile." "I've recorded a lot of cheating songs, but there were a lot of cheating songs I turned down. It depends on the lyrics...God loves prostitutes, too," Mandrell further commented.

=== Voice ===
Mandrell's singing voice has also been the subject of discussion among writers and critics. Mary Bufwack and Robert Oermann commented that her habit of smoking cigarettes made her voice stand out: "Barbara is a heavy smoker, and this gives her vocals a hoarse, urgent quality that she put to good use on 'blue-eyed soul' versions of R&B songs," they commented in 2003. In 1982, The Washington Post highlighted Mandrell's singing in a review of her concert performance: "At other times, the gritty edges of her husky voice crackled with R&B flourishes and gospel fervor. It was an impressive display." In 1984, The Oklahoman commented on her live singing, as well: "She can perform almost anything short of grand opera; in fact, if she took a mind to, she probably could do that too (after all, Linda Ronstadt did!)."

== Legacy, influence, and honors ==
Mandrell has been widely considered among country music's most successful artists and all–around entertainers. "Perhaps the toughest soldier in the female army that invaded the country charts in the 1970s, Barbara could outwork, outperform, out-talk, and out-smile virtually anyone in show business," wrote Mary A. Bufwack and Robert K. Oermann. Jason Ankeny of AllMusic commented in a similar fashion: "Thanks to a string of hit singles and a popular television variety series, vocalist Barbara Mandrell was arguably the biggest female star in country music in the late '70s and early '80s." Paul Kingsbury, Michael McCall and John Rumble explained that Mandrell, "took her soul–country style to the biggest showrooms of Las Vegas, ruled the country charts during the late 1970s and early 1980s, starred on network TV, and told her story in one of country's best–selling autobiographies".

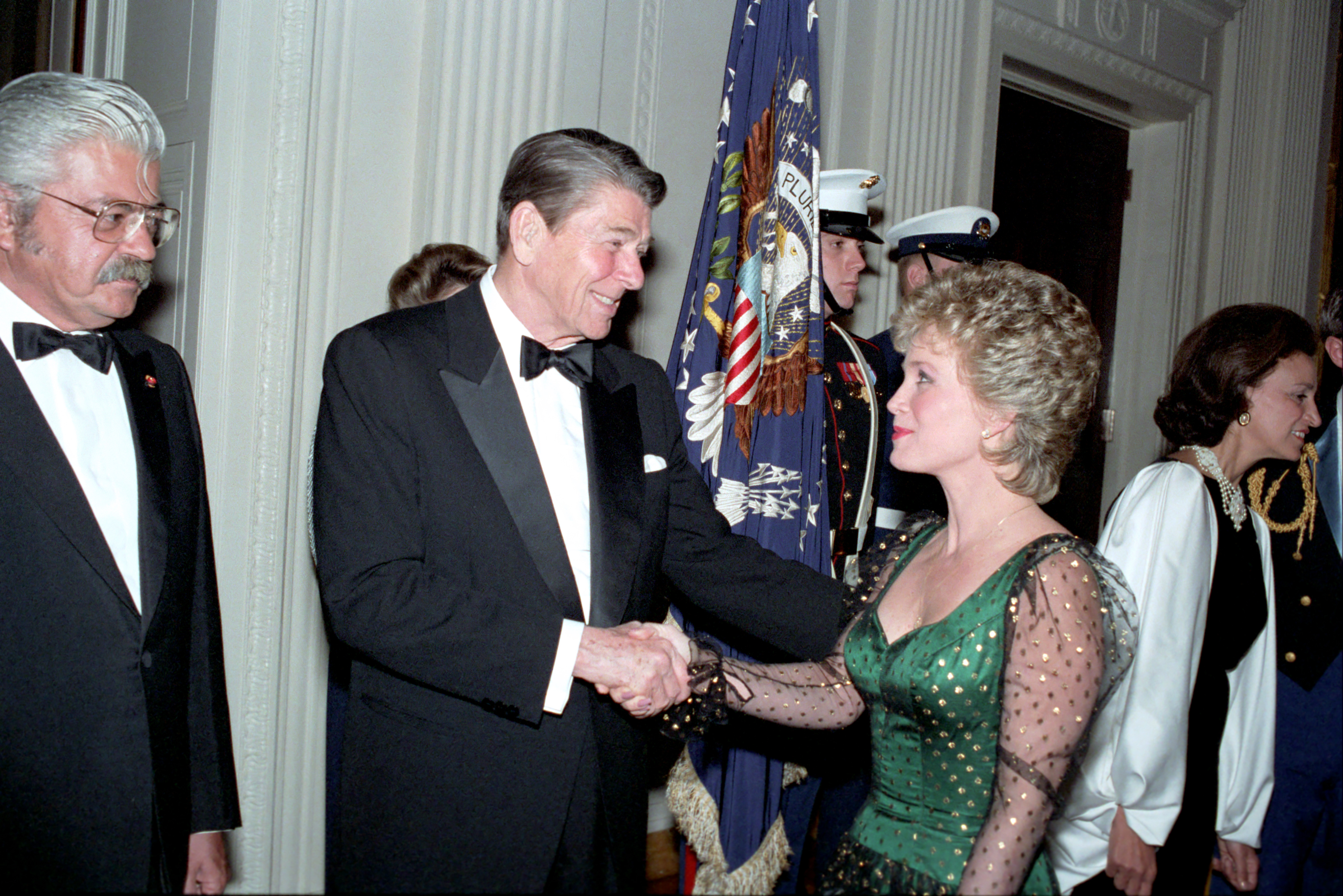
President Ronald Reagan shakes hands with Mandrell at The White House, 1986.

Her influence on future artists has also shaped her legacy. Mandrell has been credited as an influence for Terri Clark, Reba McEntire, and Carly Pearce. McEntire thanked Mandrell in 2009 and spoke about her influence: "I thank you for the things that you've taught me, not only musically, but spiritually...And I will always treasure our relationship with all my heart." In 2006, several artists re-recorded several of Mandrell's most popular singles in tribute to her career. The project was titled She Was Country When Country Wasn't Cool: A Tribute to Barbara Mandrell. It featured of remakes of her songs performed by contemporary country performers such was Kenny Chesney, Sara Evans and LeAnn Rimes.

Mandrell has been only one of a few women to win the Country Music Association's Entertainer of the Year award, and one of only two women (alongside Taylor Swift) to win the award twice. She was also the first individual to win the accolade in back-to-back years (1980 and 1981). In 2005, she received the Triple Crown accolade from the Academy of Country Music for winning three major awards from the association. She is only one of several people to have since won the award. In 2009, Mandrell was inducted into the Country Music Hall of Fame and Museum. She was inducted that year along with Roy Clark and Charlie McCoy. Her induction was celebrated that year at the Country Music Association Awards where Mandrell gave a speech to thank the industry.

Mandrell's legacy was further cemented when she released her 1990 autobiography called Get to the Heart: My Story (co-written with writer George Vecsey). In 1997, the book was turned into a television movie titled Get to the Heart: The Barbara Mandrell Story. She was portrayed in the film by television actress Maureen McCormick. Mandrell briefly made a cameo appearance at the beginning and end of the film.

In 2020, American disc jockey and producer Dave Audé partnered with Mandrell to remix her 1978 song "Sleeping Single in a Double Bed". Rolling Stone explained that the song was remixed as "the first step in a new effort to bring Barbara Mandrell's music into the digital age." It was followed by all of Mandrell's LPs being reissued to digital and streaming sites. Her original Columbia, ABC–Dot, MCA, and Capitol albums were all re–released through various digital platforms.

In July 2022, Mandrell celebrated 50 years as a member of the Grand Ole Opry. Several Opry members and country artists performed on the stage to honor Mandrell's legacy. Among the artists who performed that night were Suzy Bogguss, Jeannie Seely, and Carrie Underwood.

== Personal life ==
=== Marriage and family life ===
Mandrell has been married to former musician and Navy pilot Ken Dudney since 1967. Dudney was originally hired as the drummer for Mandrell's family band. The pair met when she was 14 and he was 21. Dudney was engaged to another woman at the time. However, he broke off the engagement after having feelings for Mandrell. In 2003, Mandrell commented: "I'd dated him since I was 14 and I just couldn't wait to graduate high school so I could be Mrs. Ken Dudney."

At the time of their marriage, Dudney gave up his career as a Navy pilot to help further his wife's career. The couple welcomed their first child, Matthew, in 1970, followed by daughter Jaime in 1976. In 1985, Mandrell gave birth to her third child, Nathan. Matthew was married to singer Christy Sutherland.

In 1988, Mandrell and her family built a log cabin mansion called the Fontanel Mansion. The home consisted of six bedrooms, 13 bathrooms, two kitchens, five fireplaces, and a helicopter landing pad. It has been considered to be the largest log cabin home in the world. Mandrell sold the home in 2002 to downsize by auction. It has since been turned into a tourist attraction with a restaurant, hotel, outdoor music venue, and indoor shooting range. Her daughter Jaime was the human resources manager of the mansion until February 2017. She then began a new career with a company that works to place people with addiction issues into appropriate rehabilitation facilities.

=== Car crash ===
On September 11, 1984, Mandrell and her two children were involved in a head-on car collision near their Nashville home. The driver of the other car in the crash (19-year-old college student Mark White) was killed instantly. The police report stated that White's car had crossed the center line of the road, causing a head-on collision with Mandrell's Jaguar XJ. Mandrell's children suffered only minor injuries and were released from the hospital shortly after their arrival. Mandrell suffered critical injuries from the crash. These injuries included a broken femur, shattered ankle, injured knee and a concussion resulting in temporary brain damage.

Mandrell's injuries from the crash resulted in her suffering from pain throughout her body for months. Much of the physical pain she suffered came from knee injuries. "You can't say she's in terrible pain all the time if the pain she's in is the kind where she's trying to exceed what that knee will do, trying to make it do its full thing again. Every day she's trying to make it exceed what it did the day before so she can finally get it back to full capacity," said father Irby Mandrell to the Chicago Tribune.

As a result of Mandrell's head injuries, she had a temporary shift in personality and experienced memory loss. "I would refer to myself in the third person: 'That was her' or 'She did that' or 'You should have asked her. I can't do that'," she told The 700 Club. Mandrell's injuries took over a year to fully recover. In an interview with CMT, she explained that her head injury took about three years to fully recover. She explained that she still suffers from pain in her ankle.

Mandrell has credited seat belts for saving her children and her lives. Prior to the day of the crash, Mandrell was not a seat belt user. However, minutes prior to the crash, she observed unbelted children playing around in the back of a moving car. Thinking this unsafe, she told her children to put on their seat belts and she would, as well. After the crash, she campaigned and filmed television commercials that advocated for the use of seat belts in cars. She campaigned for arthritis and organ donation. Mandrell was made honorary chairman of the National Highway Traffic Safety Administration in 1985.

Nearly a year later, in accordance with Tennessee state law, Mandrell was required to sue the White family for $10.3 million in damages to collect from her own insurance company. Her legal team contacted the White family to inform them that Mandrell did not want money from them, but instead needed to do it for legal purposes. The lawsuit created controversy among Mandrell's fans. "I'm not blaming the public ... I would have felt the way they felt", she commented in 1995.

== Discography ==
Studio albums

- Treat Him Right (1971)
- A Perfect Match (with David Houston) (1972)
- The Midnight Oil (1973)
- This Time I Almost Made It (1974)
- This Is Barbara Mandrell (1976)
- Midnight Angel (1976)
- Lovers, Friends and Strangers (1977)
- Love's Ups and Downs (1977)
- Moods (1978)
- Just for the Record (1979)
- Love Is Fair (1980)
- ...In Black & White (1982)
- He Set My Life to Music (1982)
- Spun Gold (1983)
- Clean Cut (1984)
- Meant for Each Other (with Lee Greenwood) (1984)
- Christmas at Our House (1984)
- Get to the Heart (1985)
- Moments (1986)
- Sure Feels Good (1987)
- I'll Be Your Jukebox Tonight (1988)
- Precious Memories (1989)
- Morning Sun (1990)
- No Nonsense (1990)
- Key's in the Mailbox (1991)
- Acoustic Attitude (1994)
- It Works for Me (1994)

== Awards and nominations ==
Barbara Mandrell has won many awards for her work as an entertainer. This includes six accolades from the Academy of Country Music, four from the Country Music Association and two from the Grammy Awards.

== Filmography ==
List of television appearances by Barbara Mandrell, showing all relevant details
Title	Year	Role	Notes	Ref.
The Rockford Files	1979	Herself	Season 6, episode 5; "Love Is the Word"	
Skinflint: A Country Christmas Carol	1979	Emmy	Television movie	
Barbara Mandrell & the Mandrell Sisters	1980–1982	Herself	35 episodes Golden Globe Award for Best Actress – Television Series Musical or Comedy – Nominated	
Barbara Mandrell: The Lady Is a Champ	1983	Herself	Television special	
Burning Rage	1984	Kate Bishop	Television movie	
The Statler Brothers Show	1991	Herself	Season 1, episode 1	
Empty Nest	1993	Ellen	Season 5, episode 25; "Charley to the Rescue"	
The Commish	1994	Dr. Gloria Cutler	Season 4	
Touched by an Angel	1996–1998	Terri Hayman; Ada Dobbin	Season 2, episode 16; "Jacob's Ladder"; Season 4, episode 15; "Doodlebugs"	
Dr. Quinn, Medicine Woman	1996	Gilda St. Clair	Season 5, episode 4; "All That Glitters..."	
Baywatch	1997	Cassie Cole	Season 7	
Diagnosis Murder	1997	Betty Manning	Season 4, episode 18; "Murder, Country Style"	
Get to the Heart: The Barbara Mandrell Story	1997	Herself	Television movie	
Sunset Beach	1997–1998	Alex Mitchum	36 episodes	
Love Boat: The Next Wave	1998	Andrea	Season 2, episode 5; "All That Glitters"	
The Wrong Girl	1999	Angela Fischer	Television movie	
Stolen from the Heart	2000	Ruth Wagner	Television movie	
Walker, Texas Ranger	2000	Nicole Foley	Season 8, episode 21; "Showdown at Casa Diable, Part 1"	

== Books ==
- Get to the Heart: My Story (with George Vecsey) (1990)
