= Sylvia discography =

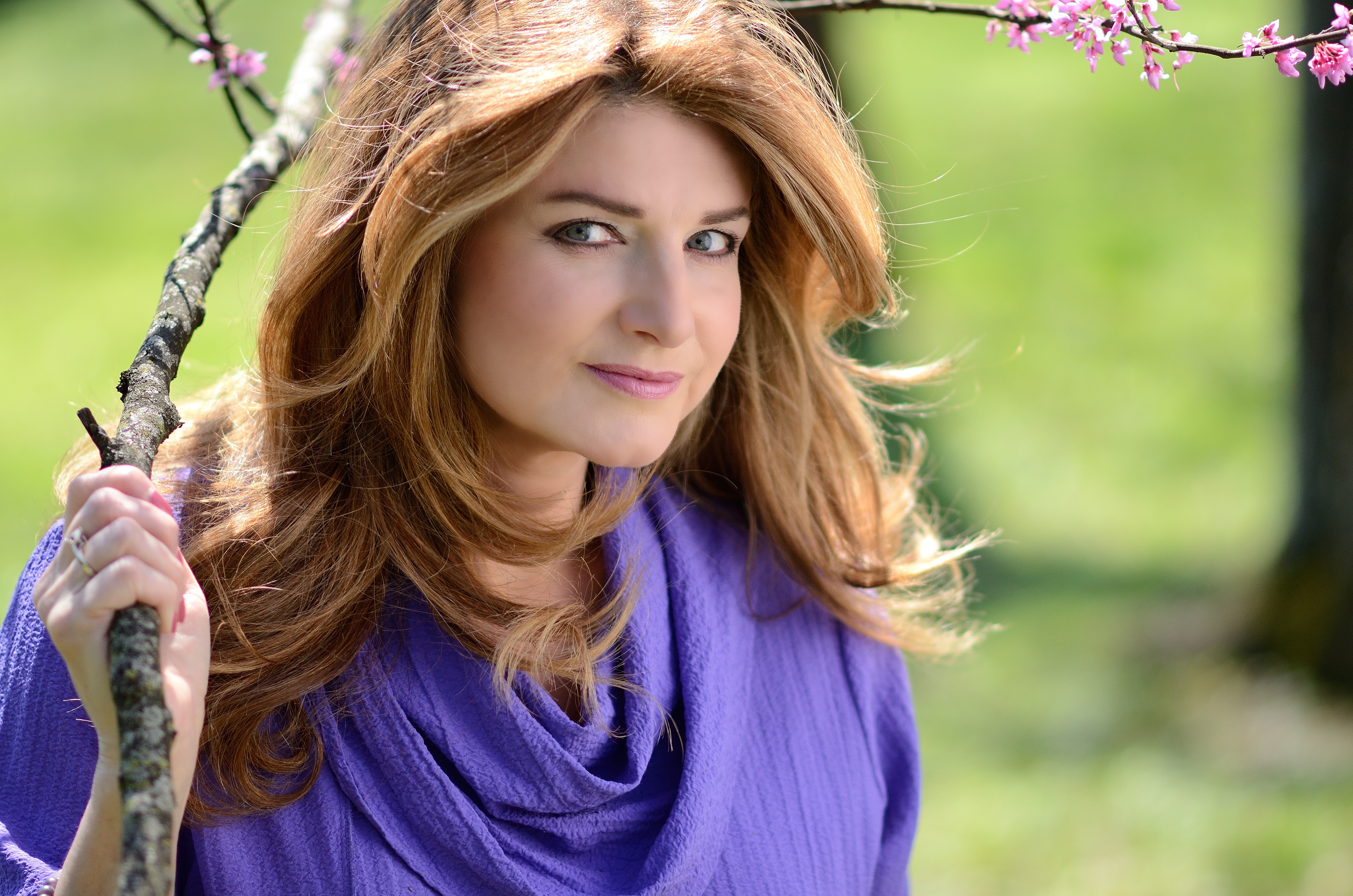
- Sylvia, circa 2020.
- Studio albums: 12
- Compilation albums: 4
- Singles: 23
- Video albums: 1
- Music videos: 6
- Other appearances: 1

The discography of American country music artist Sylvia contains 12 studio albums, four compilation albums, one video album, six music videos, 23 singles and one album appearance. She was signed to RCA Records and collaborated with producer Tom Collins, who established her as a country pop recording artist. Her first charting single was 1979's "You Don't Miss a Thing," which reached the top 40 of the Billboard Hot Country Songs chart. She had her first major hit in 1980 with "Tumbleweed." In 1981, Sylvia her first number one hit on the country songs chart with "Drifter." Her debut studio album was also released in 1981 and peaked at number 10 on the Billboard Top Country Albums chart. In 1982, Sylvia had her biggest hit with the single "Nobody." Not only did it top the country songs chart, but it also crossed over to number 15 on the Billboard Hot 100. It was followed by "Like Nothing Ever Happened," which reached number two on the country singles list. Both songs were included on her second album, Just Sylvia. It sold over 500,000 copies in the United States, leading to its gold certification from the Recording Industry Association of America.

In 1983, Sylvia followed with Snapshot, which reached number seven on the country albums survey. It produced three top ten hits, including the number three "I Never Quite Got Back (From Loving You)." In 1984, Surprise, only reached number 40 on the country albums list. Her country pop sound caused Sylvia to become increasingly frustrated. She soon joined with Brent Maher who produced her next two releases for RCA. The first was One Step Closer (1985), which spawned three major hits: "Fallin' in Love," "Cry Just a Little Bit" and "I Love You by Heart." The follow-up album with Maher (Knockin' Around) was never released and Sylvia left RCA Records in 1987. She re-surfaced in 1992 as a touring artist. Her next album release was 1996's The Real Story. She continued releasing new music and issued 2002's Where in the World next. Her most recent studio effort is a collection of re-recordings entitled Second Bloom: The Hits Re-Imagined.

== Albums ==
=== Studio albums ===
List of albums, with selected chart positions and certifications, showing other relevant details
Title	Album details	Peak chart positions			Certifications
Title	Album details	US	US Cou.	CAN	Certifications
Drifter	Released: April 1981; Label: RCA; Formats: LP, cassette	139	10	—	
Just Sylvia	Released: May 1982; Label: RCA; Formats: LP, cassette	56	2	51	MC: Gold; RIAA: Gold
Snapshot	Released: May 1983; Label: RCA; Formats: LP, cassette	77	7	62	
Surprise	Released: March 1984; Label: RCA; Formats: LP, cassette, CD	178	40	—	
One Step Closer	Released: February 1985; Label: RCA; Formats: LP, cassette, CD	—	19	—	
The Real Story	Released: November 11, 1996; Label: Red Pony; Formats: CD, cassette	—	—	—	
Where in the World	Released: 2002; Label: Red Pony; Formats: CD	—	—	—	
A Cradle in Bethlehem	Released: November 11, 2002; Label: Red Pony; Formats: CD	—	—	—	
It's All in the Family	Released: October 7, 2016; Label: Red Pony; Formats: CD, music download	—	—	—	
Second Bloom: The Hits Re-Imagined (re-recordings)	Released: June 8, 2018; Label: Red Pony; Formats: CD, music download	—	—	—	
Nature Child: A Dreamer's Journey	Released: February 22, 2022; Label: Red Pony; Formats: CD, music download	—	—	—	
Knockin' Around (The Lost Album)	Released: June 7, 2024; Label: RCA / Legacy; Formats: music download	—	—	—	
"—" denotes a recording that did not chart or was not released in that territory.

=== Compilation albums ===
List of albums, with selected chart positions, showing other relevant details
Title	Album details	Peak chart positions
Title	Album details	US Country
Greatest Hits	Released: 1987; Label: RCA; Formats: LP, cassette, CD	59
Anthology	Released: November 18, 1997; Label: Renaissance; Formats: CD	—
RCA Country Legends: Sylvia	Released: September 10, 2002; Label: RCA; Formats: CD	—
All-American Country	Released: February 27, 2007; Label: Sony BMG; Formats: CD	—
"—" denotes a recording that did not chart or was not released in that territory.

=== Video albums ===
List of video albums, showing all relevant details
Title	Album details
RCA's All-Star Country Music Fair (with Charley Pride, Razzy Bailey and Earl Thomas Conley)	Released: 1982; Label: RCA; Formats: CED

== Singles ==
=== As lead artist ===
List of singles, with selected chart positions and certifications, showing other relevant details
Title	Year	Peak chart positions								Certifications	Album
Title	Year	US	US AC	US Cou.	AUS	CAN	CAN AC	CAN Cou.	NZ	Certifications	Album
"You Don't Miss a Thing"	1979	—	—	36	—	—	—	—	—		—N/a
"It Don't Hurt to Dream"	1980	—	—	35	—	—	—	—	—		Drifter
"Tumbleweed"	1980	—	—	10	—	—	—	—	—		Drifter
"Drifter"	1981	—	—	1	—	—	—	13	—		Drifter
"The Matador"	1981	—	—	7	—	—	—	8	—		Drifter
"Heart on the Mend"	1981	—	—	8	—	—	—	11	—		Drifter
"Sweet Yesterday"	1982	—	—	12	—	—	—	11	—		Just Sylvia
"Nobody"	1982	15	5	1	41	5	5	1	2	RIAA: Gold	Just Sylvia
"Like Nothing Ever Happened"	1982	—	—	2	—	—	—	1	—		Just Sylvia
"Snapshot"	1983	—	—	5	—	—	—	3	—		Snapshot
"The Boy Gets Around"	1983	—	—	18	—	—	—	7	—		Snapshot
"I Never Quite Got Back (From Loving You)"	1983	—	—	3	—	—	—	2	—		Snapshot
"Victims of Goodbye"	1984	—	44	24	—	—	—	19	—		Surprise
"Love Over Old Times"	1984	—	—	36	—	—	—	50	—		Surprise
"Fallin' in Love"	1985	—	—	2	—	—	—	1	—		One Step Closer
"Cry Just a Little Bit"	1985	—	—	9	—	—	—	8	—		One Step Closer
"I Love You by Heart" (with Michael Johnson)	1985	—	—	9	—	—	—	7	—		One Step Closer
"Nothin' Ventured Nothin' Gained"	1986	—	—	33	—	—	—	—	—		Knockin' Around (The Lost Album)
"Straight from My Heart"	1987	—	—	66	—	—	—	—	—		Greatest Hits
"Cumberland Rose"	2011	—	—	—	—	—	—	—	—		It's All in the Family
"Nobody" (re-recording)	2018	—	—	—	—	—	—	—	—		Second Bloom: The Hits Re-Imagined
"Sing Me into You"	2024	—	—	—	—	—	—	—	—		—N/a
"—" denotes a recording that did not chart or was not released in that territory.

=== As a featured artist ===
List of singles, with selected chart positions, showing other relevant details
Title	Year	Peak chart positions			Album
Title	Year	US Cou.	CAN AC	CAN Cou.	Album
"The Wayward Wind" (James Galway with Sylvia)	1983	57	13	29	The Wayward Wind

== Music videos ==
List of music videos, showing year released and director
Title	Year	Director(s)	Ref.
"Drifter"	1981	Marc Ball	
"The Matador"	1981	Marc Ball	
"Heart on the Mend"	1981	Marc Ball	
"I Never Quite Got Back (From Loving You)"	1983	—N/a	
"Snapshot"	1983	David Hogan	
"Victims of Goodbye"	1984	David Hogan	
"Cry Just a Little Bit"	1985	—N/a	

== Other album appearances ==
List of non-single guest appearances, showing year released, artist and album name
Title	Year	Other artist(s)	Album	Ref.'
"'Til I Can Make It on My Own"	2003	Kate Campbell	Twang on a Wire	
