= Greatest Hits (Sylvia album) =

Greatest hits album by Sylvia
- Released: 1987
- Recorded: 1980–1986
- Genre: Country; Urban Cowboy
- Label: RCA Victor
- Producer: Tom Collins; Tim DuBois; Scott Hendricks; Brent Maher; Don Potter

Sylvia chronology
One Step Closer (1985)	Greatest Hits (1987)	The Real Story (1996)

Singles from Greatest Hits
- 1. "Straight from My Heart" Released: February 1987

Greatest Hits is a compilation album released by American country music artist Sylvia. It was released in 1987 via RCA Records was produced by various individuals, including Tom Collins and Brent Maher. It was the last album released by Sylvia while she was recording for the RCA record label. It also spawned one single, which became a minor hit on the Billboard country chart.

== Background, release and reception ==
Sylvia had commercial success at RCA as a recording artist in the 1980s. Under the supervision of producer Tom Collins, he established her sound around upbeat country pop melodies. However, her 1986 album was not released by the label and she was eventually dropped by the label in 1987. Greatest Hits would be her final album released by her label before she would be dropped. It included a total of nine tracks. Seven of the album's tracks were among Sylvia's biggest hits. This included her two number one singles: "Drifter" (1981) and "Nobody" (1982). Also featured are the top ten hits "Snapshot" (1983), "I Never Quite Got Back (From Loving You)" (1983), "Fallin' In Love" (1985) and "Cry Just a Little Bit" (1985). During her time at RCA, Sylvia collaborated with various producers, resulting in a series of production credits on the album.

Greatest Hits was released in 1987 on RCA Records. It was released in several formats, including a cassette and compact disc. Following its release, the album spent eight weeks on the Billboard Top Country Albums chart. In August 1987, it peaked at number 59. It is Sylvia's final charting album to date The album also included two new songs, notably "Straight From My Heart." The track was spawned as the album's only single in February 1987, also via RCA. Spending six weeks on the Billboard Hot Country Songs chart, it eventually peaked at number 66 in May 1987. Thom Owens of Allmusic gave a mostly positive response in his review of Greatest Hits, calling it "brief but entertaining."

== Track listing ==
=== Vinyl and cassette versions ===
Side one
No.	Title	Writer(s)	Length
1.	"Nobody"	Kye Fleming; Dennis Morgan	3:17
2.	"Tumbleweed"	Fleming; Morgan	3:11
3.	"Drifter"	Archie Jordan; Don Pfrimmer	2:25
4.	"Cry Just a Little Bit"	Bob Heatlie	2:56
5.	"Fallin' In Love"	Randy Goodrum; Brent Maher	2:55

Side two
No.	Title	Writer(s)	Length
1.	"Straight From My Heart"	Jimmy Fortune; Sylvia	3:17
2.	"Sweet Yesterday"	Fleming; Morgan	3:45
3.	"Never My Love"	Dick Addrisi and Don Addrisi	3:54
4.	"Snapshot"	Fleming; Morgan	3:41

=== Compact disc version ===
Greatest Hits (1987)
No.	Title	Writer(s)	Length
1.	"Nobody"	Fleming; Morgan	3:17
2.	"Tumbleweed"	Fleming; Morgan	3:11
3.	"Drifter"	Jordan; Pfrimmer	2:25
4.	"Cry Just a Little Bit"	Heatlie	2:56
5.	"Fallin' in Love"	Goodrum; Maher	2:55
6.	"Straight From My Heart"	Fortune; Sylvia	3:17
7.	"Sweet Yesterday"	Fleming; Morgan	3:45
8.	"Never My Love"	D. Addrisi; D. Addrisi	3:54
9.	"Snapshot"	Fleming; Morgan	3:41

== Personnel ==
All credits are adapted from the liner notes of Greatest Hits.

Musical and technical personnel

- Tom Collins – producer (tracks 1–3, 7, 9)
- Bill Brunt – art direction, design
- Tim DuBois – producer (track 6)
- Greg Gorman – photography
- Scott Hendricks – producer (track 6)
- Brent Maher – producer (tracks, 4, 5, 8)
- Don Potter – producer (tracks 4, 5, 8)
- Danny Purcell – mastering
- Sylvia – lead vocals, background vocals

== Chart performance ==
Chart (1987)	Peak position
US Top Country Albums (Billboard)	59

== Release history ==
Region	Date	Format	Label	Ref.
United States	1987	Vinyl	RCA Records	
United States	1987	Cassette	RCA Records	
United States	1987	Compact disc	RCA Records	
