= Snapshot (Sylvia album) =

Studio album by Sylvia
- Released: May 1983
- Studio: Music City Music Hall
- Genres: Country; country pop; adult contemporary
- Length: 35:23
- Label: RCA Victor
- Producer: Tom Collins

Sylvia chronology
Just Sylvia (1982)	Snapshot (1983)	Surprise (1984)

Singles from Snapshot
- 1. "Snapshot" Released: May 1983; 2. "The Boy Gets Around" Released: August 1983; 3. "I Never Quite Got Back (From Loving You)" Released: December 1983

Snapshot is a studio album by American singer, Sylvia, released in May 1983 by RCA Records and was her third studio album. It consisted of ten tracks, six of which were written by Kye Fleming and Dennis Morgan. The selection featured a variety of songs with unique themes and received a positive critical response. Snapshot became her third top ten disc on the US country LP's chart and spawned three singles that became top ten US-Canadian songs: the title track, "The Boy Gets Around" and "I Never Quite Got Back (From Loving You)".

== Background, recording and content ==
In 1979, Sylvia secured a recording contract with RCA Records in Nashville, Tennessee and by 1981, she found commercial success with songs like "Drifter". It was followed in 1982 by her second album, Just Sylvia, which featured the crossover country song, "Nobody". It would be followed by her third studio album, Snapshot. The album was recorded at Music City Music Hall in Nashville and was produced entirely by Tom Collins. In an interview with the Albany Sunday Herald, Sylvia described the album's style as being "my natural progression of becoming more upbeat". Snapshot consisted of ten tracks, seven of which were written by Kye Fleming and Dennis Morgan. The songs featured various story lines, including a song about the American Civil War ("Bobby's in Vicksburg"), a song about a spouse whose husband is cheating on her ("Snapshot") and a love song ("Jason").

== Critical reception ==
Snapshot received mostly positive reviews following its release. Billboard named it among its "Top Album Picks", finding that Sylvia's voice has matured "in its ability to convey emotional nuances". They also called several of the tunes "skillfully written and sensitively interpreted", such as "Bobby's in Vicksburg", "Winter Heart" and "The Boy Gets Around". Cash Box found the album mixed several styles including Rockabilly and Motown. "Sylvia seems more poised and confident than ever with flawless readings of the tunes, while Tom Collins succeeds in taking a few daring chances in the production of the country disc," they wrote. People wrote, "She just might be the hottest thing to hit Nashville since Tootsie's Orchid Lounge. This album should consolidate her position nicely."

== Release and chart performance ==
Snapshot was released by RCA Records in May 1983 and was originally offered in two formats: a vinyl LP or a cassette. It reached the top ten of the US Billboard Top Country Albums chart, reaching the number seven position. It was Sylvia's third album to make the chart and third to make the top ten. It would also be her final album to make the Billboard country top ten. Additionally, Snapshot made the US Billboard 200 all-genre chart, rising to number 77. It was her third and second-highest peaking album on the Billboard 200. It was also her second and final album to reach Canada's RPM Top Albums chart, rising to number 62.

== Singles ==
Snapshot included a total of three singles. Its earliest single was the title track, which was first issued by RCA in May 1983. It became her seventh top ten single on the US Hot Country Songs chart, reaching the number five position. It was her fourth top ten single on Canada's Country Tracks chart, peaking at number three. The album spawned a second single in August 1983: "The Boy Gets Around". It placed in the top 20 of the US country songs chart, peaking at number 18 while climbing into the Canadian country top ten, peaking at number seven. The third and final single spawned was "I Never Quite Got Back (From Loving You)". It became Sylvia's eighth US country top ten single (peaking at number three) and sixth Canadian country top ten single (peaking at number two).

== Track listing ==
All songs were written by Kye Fleming and Dennis Morgan, unless stated otherwise.

Snapshot
No.	Title	Writer(s)	Length
1.	"Snapshot"		3:41
2.	"Tonight I'm Getting Friendly with the Blues"	William T. Davidson	2:53
3.	"Winter Heart"		3:29
4.	"Bobby's in Vicksburg"		3:29
5.	"Gone But Not Forgotten"		3:31
6.	"The Boy Gets Around"		3:27
7.	"Who's Kidding Who"	Davidson; Charles Quillen	3:25
8.	"Jason"	Fleming; Morgan; Mack David	4:12
9.	"So Complete"	Fleming; Morgan; Karen Charlton	3:14
10.	"I Never Quite Got Back (From Loving You)"	Mike Reid; Don Pfrimmer	3:33

== Personnel ==
All credits are adapted from the liner notes of Snapshot.

Musical personnel

- Sylvia – Lead vocals
- Jimmy Capps, Pete Bordonali, Dennis W. Morgan – Guitar
- David Hungate, Joe Osborn – Bass
- David Briggs, Shane Keister, Bobby Ogdin – Keyboards
- Bobby Ogdin, Shane Keister – Synthesizer
- Jerry Kroon, Larrie Londin, Buster Phillips, James Stroud – Drums
- Farrell Morris, James Stroud – Percussion
- Nashville String Machine – Strings
- The Cherry Sisters, Phil Forrest, Sherry Kean, Judy Rodman, Lisa Silver, Diane Tidwell, Dennis Wilson – Backing vocals

Technical personnel

- Tom Collins – Producer
- Bill Harris – Engineer
- Lois Walker – Mastering
- Bergen White – Arrangement

== Chart performance ==
Chart (1983)	Peak position
Canada Top Albums (RPM)	62
US Billboard 200	77
US Top Country Albums (Billboard)	7

== Release history ==
Release history and formats for Snapshot
Region	Date	Format	Label	Ref.
Various	May 1983	Vinyl LP; cassette	RCA Records	
Various	1984	Compact disc	RCA Records	
Various	2024	Digital download; streaming	Sony Music Entertainment	
