= The Boy Gets Around =

Single by Sylvia

from the album Snapshot
- B-side: "Who's Kidding Who"
- Released: July 1983
- Recorded: March 9, 1983
- Studio: Music City Hall
- Genre: Country; Urban Cowboy
- Length: 3:27
- Label: RCA
- Songwriters: Kye Fleming; Dennis Morgan
- Producer: Tom Collins

Sylvia singles chronology
"Snapshot" (1983)	"The Boy Gets Around" (1983)	"I Never Quite Got Back (From Loving You)" (1983)

"The Boy Gets Around" is a song written by Kye Fleming and Dennis Morgan, and recorded by American country music artist Sylvia. It was released in July 1983 as the second single from the album Snapshot. The song first appeared on Sylvia's third studio album in 1983 before its release as a single the same year. The song became a top 20 hit on the Billboard country chart.

== Background and release ==
By 1983, Sylvia was an established country pop recording star. She had several major hits, including 1982's "Nobody," which became a number one country hit and a crossover pop hit. With her recent success, she returned to the recording studio to cut several songs, which included "The Boy Gets Around." The song was cut at the Music City Hall recording studio on March 9, 1983. The studio was located in Nashville, Tennessee and the session was produced by Tom Collins. Collins would go on to produce the album in which the song was later included on and recorded her next album as well. Two additional tracks were cut at the same studio session that would appear on her next album: "Tonight I'm Getting Friendly with the Blues" and "Bobby's in Vicksburg."

"The Boy Gets Around" was first included on Sylvia's third studio album, Snapshot (1983). In July 1983, the song was released as a single via RCA Records in July 1983. It was her second single released off of the album. The single spent a total of 17 weeks on the Billboard Hot Country Songs chart before peaking at number 18 in October 1983. "The Boy Gets Around" was Sylvia's first single to miss the country top 10 since 1981's "Sweet Yesterday." It became her fifth top ten hit on the Canadian RPM Country Songs chart.

== Track listing ==
7" vinyl single

- "The Boy Gets Around" – 3:27
- "Who's Kidding Who" – 3:25

== Chart performance ==
Chart (1983)	Peak position
Canada Country Songs (RPM)	7
US Hot Country Songs (Billboard)	18
