= Just for the Record (Barbara Mandrell album) =

Studio album by Barbara Mandrell
- Released: August 17, 1979
- Studio: Woodland (Nashville, Tennessee)
- Genre: Country pop
- Label: MCA Nashville
- Producer: Tom Collins

Barbara Mandrell chronology
Moods (1978)	Just for the Record (1979)	Love Is Fair (1980)

Singles from Just for the Record
- 1. "Fooled by a Feeling" Released: July 23, 1979; 2. "Years" Released: December 3, 1979

Professional ratings
Review scores
Source	Rating
AllMusic	3/5 stars

Just for the Record is the ninth solo studio album by American country music singer Barbara Mandrell. It was released in August 1979.

Mandrell's career was beginning to reach its peak with the end of the 1970s. As such, her sound began to change, particularly with this album. Like her previous album Moods, two singles were released from Just for the Record. Both of these singles were Top 5 Country hits. The first single, "Fooled by a Feeling", also peaked on the Billboard Hot 100 and on the Top 30 on the Adult Contemporary charts. The second single, "Years", went to #1, as well as the Top 40 on the Adult Contemporary charts. This exemplified Mandrell's new crossover style. The album was produced by Tom Collins, who helped Mandrell bring out this pop sound onto her albums.

The album also included a cover of a pop tune called "Darlin'", also recorded by Tom Jones.

Just for the Record proved to be very successful, peaking at #9 on the Top Country Albums chart in 1979, as well as reaching #166 on the Billboard 200, her third album to chart there.

== Track listing ==
All tracks composed by Kye Fleming and Dennis Morgan; except where indicated.

Just For The Record
No.	Title	Length
1.	"Fooled by a Feeling"	3:05
2.	"Years"	3:52
3.	"My Love Can Do No Wrong"	2:50
4.	"She's Out There Dancin' Alone"	3:29
5.	"Selfish (Morgan)"	3:27
6.	"Darlin' (Oscar Stewart Blandamer)"	3:19
7.	"Using Him to Get To You"	3:03
8.	"Is It Love Yet"	2:54
9.	"Can Wait (Ben Peters)"	2:48
10.	"Love Takes a Long Time to Die (Morgan)"	3:08
Total length:		32:02

== Personnel ==
- Background Vocals: Lea Jane Berinati, Tom Brannon, Steve Brantley, Thomas Cain, Bruce Dees, Janie Fricke, Rob Galbraith, Hank Martin, Donna Sheridan, Lisa Silver, Karen Taylor, Duane West, Randy Wright
- Bass guitar: Mike Leech
- Celesta: Tom Collins
- Clavinet: Charlie McCoy
- Drums: Roger Clark, Larrie Londin, Kenny Malone
- Guitar: Pete Bordonali, Jimmy Capps, Bruce Dees
- Harmonica: Charlie McCoy
- Lead Vocals: Barbara Mandrell
- Mandolin: Pete Bordonali
- Piano: David Briggs, Bobby Ogdin
- Programming: Lee Hargrove
- Steel Guitar: John Hughey
- Strings: Sheldon Kurland Strings
- String Arranger. Mike Leech
- Synthesizer: Lee Hargrove, Shane Keister, Bobby Ogdin
- Synthesizer Drums: Clyde Brooks

== Charts ==
=== Weekly charts ===
Chart (1979)	Peak position
US Billboard 200	166
US Top Country Albums (Billboard)	9

=== Year-end charts ===
Chart (1980)	Position
US Top Country Albums (Billboard)	33

Singles – Billboard (North America)

Year	Single	Chart	Position
1979	"Fooled by a Feeling"	Hot Country Singles & Tracks	#4
1979	"Fooled by a Feeling"	Billboard Hot 100	#89
1979	"Fooled by a Feeling"	Hot Adult Contemporary Tracks	#26
1979	"Years"	Hot Country Singles & Tracks	#1
1979	"Years"	Bubbling Hot 100	#102
1979	"Years"	Hot Adult Contemporary Tracks	#38
