= Just Sylvia =

Studio album by Sylvia
- Released: May 1982
- Studios: Music City Music Hall; Woodland Sound Studios
- Genres: Country; pop; adult contemporary
- Length: 34:24
- Label: RCA Victor
- Producer: Tom Collins

Sylvia chronology
Drifter (1981)	Just Sylvia (1982)	Snapshot (1983)

Singles from Just Sylvia
- 1. "Sweet Yesterday" Released: January 1982; 2. "Nobody" Released: June 1982; 3. "Like Nothing Ever Happened" Released: September 1982

Just Sylvia is a studio album by American singer, Sylvia, released by RCA Records in May 1982 and was her second studio album. It was considered a departure from her debut album for transitioning towards pop versus her country-themed first LP. It received critical acclaim from Billboard, Cash Box and others in the wake of its release. Three singles were spawned from the album, two of which became chart-topping US-Canadian country songs: "Like Nothing Ever Happened" and "Nobody". The latter became a crossover pop single in the US, Canada and New Zealand, leading to a gold certification for Just Sylvia in 1983. The album also made the US country LP's top five and made all-genre US-Canadian chart positions.

== Background, recording and content ==
In 1979, Sylvia signed a recording contract with RCA Records and her first single was released the same year. Her recordings gained more momentum by 1980-81 when "Tumbleweed" rose into the US country top ten and "Drifter" topped the same chart. The songs were featured on her debut studio album, Drifter, which evoked themes of the American west. For her next album, Sylvia and producer Tom Collins chose to take a different direction.

Instead, the album's sound and style took more of an adult contemporary and pop approach, but remained rooted in the country genre. Synthesizers and percussion instrumentation were also more present on the project than Sylvia's first album. Just Sylvia was recorded at two different studios in Nashville, Tennessee: Music City Music Hall and Woodland Sound Studios. The project consisted of ten tracks in total, six of which were composed by songwriting team, Kye Fleming and Dennis Morgan: "Nobody", "Sweet Yesterday", "You're a Legend in Your Own Mind", "You Can't Go Back Home", "Like Nothing Ever Happened" and "The Mill Song".

== Critical reception ==
Professional ratings
Review scores
Source	Rating
AllMusic	4/5 stars

Just Sylvia received mostly positive reviews following its release. Billboard named it among its "Top Album Picks", finding that Sylvia had "matured appreciably" into a "sophisticated singer" with "warm and polished" styling. The magazine compared the lyrics of "You're a Legend in Your Own Mind" to that of Carly Simon's "You're So Vain". Cash Box credited Collins in the success of Just Sylvia and also noted a transition from Sylvia's first album to her second: "The Durango boot representative has developed a strong identity within the country idiom, but this offering, which displays some interesting studio treatment her vocal performances, should bring her into a new circle."

When writing about her rise to fame, Alan Cackett of Country Music People magazine called the production of Just Sylvia "diverse and textured". Jerry Sharpe of The Pittsburgh Press called the project "her best album so far" and found it was more suited to the pop market than the country market. Tom Roland of AllMusic gave the album four out of five stars and wrote, "Producer Tom Collins plays around with her vocals a lot, altering them electronically for effects that range from ever-so-slight to overbearing. But the material's predominantly sassy, and as catchy as a virus."

== Release, chart performance and sales ==
Just Sylvia was released by RCA Records in May 1982 and was offered in three formats: a vinyl LP, cassette, or an 8-track cartridge. All original versions offered five tracks on each side of their corresponding discs. It was reissued on a compact disc in 1984 and digitally around 2020. The album was Sylvia's longest-running disc on the US Billboard Top Country Albums chart, spanning a series of weeks between 1982 and 1983. It rose to the number two position on the chart and became her highest-peaking album on the chart as well. It was also one of four albums in her career to make the US Billboard 200 all-genre chart, rising to the number 56 position, her highest-peaking album there. It was one of two discs in her career to make Canada's RPM Top Albums chart, peaking at number 51. Just Sylvia was also the only US country album from 1982 to certify gold in sales from the Recording Industry Association of America.

== Singles ==
A total of three singles were part of Just Sylvia. Its earliest release was "Sweet Yesterday", which was first issued in January 1982. It rose to number 12 on the US Hot Country Songs chart and number 11 on the Canadian Country Tracks chart. "Nobody" was then released as a single in June 1982 and became her second US number one country song and her first number one Canadian country song. It crossed over onto the US pop chart where it reached number 15, along with reaching number five on Canada's pop chart and went to number two on New Zealand's Recorded Music chart. The third single was released in September 1982: "Like Nothing Ever Happened". It rose to number two on the US country songs chart and became her second number one song on the Canadian country chart.

== Track listing ==
All tracks written by Kye Fleming and Dennis Morgan, except where noted.

Just Sylvia
No.	Title	Writer(s)	Length
1.	"Nobody"		3:22
2.	"Mirage"	Archie Jordan; Don Pfrimmer	3:26
3.	"Sweet Yesterday"		3:49
4.	"You're a Legend in Your Own Mind"		3:37
5.	"You Can't Go Back Home"		4:16
6.	"Like Nothing Ever Happened"		3:44
7.	"I'll Make It Right with You"	Charles Quillen; Pfrimmer	3:34
8.	"Not Tonight"	Steve Dean; John Jarrard	3:40
9.	"I Feel Cheated"	Quillen; Sue Patton	3:18
10.	"The Mill Song (Everybody's Got a Dream)"		3:38

== Personnel ==
All credits are adapted from the liner notes of Just Sylvia.

Musical personnel

- Sylvia – Lead vocals
- The Cherry Sisters, Kye Fleming, George Grantham, Sherilyn Huffman, Lisa Silver, Diane Tidwell – Backing vocals
- Dennis Morgan, Jimmy Capps – Acoustic and electric guitars
- Pete Bordonali, Fred Newell – Electric guitars, mandolin
- David Briggs – Keyboards, piano
- Archie Jordan – Piano
- Shane Keister, Bobby Ogdin – Synthesizers
- Joe Osborn – Bass
- Kenny Malone, Buster Phillips – Drums
- Nashville String Machine – Strings

Technical personnel

- Mario Casilli – Photography
- Tom Collins – Producer
- Doug Crider, David Debrush – Assistant Engineer
- Bill Harris – Engineer
- Denny Purcell – Lacquer cut

== Chart performance ==
Chart (1982–83)	Peak position
Canada Top Albums (RPM)	51
US Billboard 200	56
US Top Country Albums (Billboard)	2

== Certifications ==
Region	Certification	Certified units/sales
Canada (Music Canada)	Gold	50,000^{^}
United States (RIAA)	Gold	500,000^{^}
^{^} Shipments figures based on certification alone.

== Release history ==
Release history and formats for Just Sylvia
Region	Date	Format	Label	Ref.
Various	May 1982	Vinyl LP; 8-track cartridge; cassette	RCA Records	
Various	circa 1984	Compact disc	RCA Records	
Various	2024	Music download; streaming	Sony Music Entertainment	
