= Love Over Old Times =

Single by Sylvia

from the album Surprise
- B-side: "I Just Don't Have the Heart"
- Released: June 1984
- Genre: Country; Urban Cowboy
- Length: 3:35
- Label: RCA
- Songwriters: Lisa Angelle; Mike Reid
- Producer: Tom Collins

Sylvia singles chronology
"Victims of Goodbye" (1984)	"Love Over Old Times" (1984)	"Fallin' in Love" (1985)

"Love Over Old Times" is a song written by Lisa Angelle and Mike Reid, and recorded by American country music singer Sylvia. It was released in June 1984 as the second single from her album Surprise. It received positive reviews from Billboard and Cash Box magazines.

== Background, content and recording ==
Sylvia had a series of US country pop top ten singles during the 1980s, such as "Nobody" and "Like Nothing Ever Happened". In 1984, her next album titled Surprised was released and featured the track, "Love Over Old Times". Written by Lisa Angelle and Mike Reid, "Love Over Old Times" was described as a "romantic tune" by Cash Box. The track was produced by Tom Collins.

== Release, critical reception and chart performance ==
"Love Over Old Times" was released by RCA Records in June 1984 as a seven-inch vinyl record and included a B-side titled, "I Just Don't Have the Heart". It received positive reviews from music publications. Cash Box believed the song would get "immediate strong airplay". Billboard commented, "A first-rate delivery of some equally impressive lyrics, where in Sylvia demonstrates a vocal range from purr to passion." It reached the top 40 of the US Billboard Hot Country Songs chart, rising to the number 36 position in 1984. It was Sylvia's second single to miss the US country top 20 since 1980's "It Don't Hurt to Dream". In Canada, it peaked outside the RPM Country Tracks top 40, rising to number 50 in 1984.

== Track listing ==
7" vinyl single

- "Love Over Old Times" – 3:35
- "I Just Don't Have the Heart" – 3:08

== Chart performance ==
Weekly chart performance for "Love Over Old Times"
Chart (1984)	Peak position
Canada Country Songs (RPM)	50
US Hot Country Songs (Billboard)	36
