= Victims of Goodbye =

Song by Sylvia

Single by Sylvia

from the album Surprise
- B-side: "Unguarded Moments"
- Released: February 1984
- Recorded: 1983
- Genre: Country; Urban Cowboy
- Length: 3:01
- Label: RCA
- Songwriters: Dennis Morgan; Don Pfrimmer
- Producer: Tom Collins

Sylvia singles chronology
"I Never Quite Got Back (From Loving You)" (1983)	"Victims of Goodbye" (1984)	"Love Over Old Times" (1984)

"Victims of Goodbye" is a song written by Dennis Morgan and Don Pfrimmer, and recorded by American country music artist Sylvia. It was released in February 1984 as the first single from her album Surprise. The song became a top 40 single on the Billboard country chart.

== Background and release ==
In the early 1980s, Sylvia had become a major country music star. Under the production of Tom Collins, she was established as a country pop recording artist with crossover hits such as 1982's "Nobody." The song topped the country charts and crossed over onto the pop charts as well. Collins would also produce "Victims of Goodbye." The track was recorded in 1983 in Nashville, Tennessee, along with several other tracks for her upcoming 1984 studio album.

"Victims of Goodbye" was released as the lead single off of Sylvia's upcoming album. It was issued in February 1984 via RCA Records. The single spent 14 weeks on the Billboard Hot Country Songs before reaching number 24 in June 1984. It was Sylvia's first single since 1980 to miss the top 20 of the country songs list. Her next single would also miss the top 20. It was also her first single since 1982 to chart the Billboard adult contemporary songs chart, peaking at number 44 in June 1984. In Canada, the song reached the top 20 of the RPM Country Songs chart, peaking at number 19.

The single was later released on Sylvia's fourth studio album, Surprise. It was also released in 1984 on RCA Records. After the album's release and the lack of the single's success, Sylvia became increasingly frustrated with her musical production. She would part ways with producer Tom Collins and begin working with Brent Maher. Under his production, she enjoyed several more major hits in 1985 before leaving RCA Records in 1986.

== Track listing ==
7" vinyl single

- "Victims of Goodbye" – 3:01
- "Unguarded Moments" – 3:41

== Chart performance ==
Chart (1984)	Peak position
Canada Country Songs (RPM)	19
US Adult Contemporary (Billboard)	44
US Hot Country Songs (Billboard)	24
