= Kansas City Lights =

Single by Steve Wariner

from the album Steve Wariner
- B-side: "The Easy Part's Over"
- Released: March 6, 1982
- Genre: Country
- Length: 3:34
- Label: RCA Nashville
- Songwriter(s): Kye Fleming, Dennis Morgan
- Producer(s): Tom Collins

Steve Wariner singles chronology
"All Roads Lead to You" (1981)	"Kansas City Lights" (1982)	"Don't It Break Your Heart" (1982)

"Kansas City Lights" is a song written by Kye Fleming and Dennis Morgan, and recorded by American country music artist Steve Wariner. It was released in March 1982 as the fourth single from Wariner's self-titled debut album. The song reached #15 on the US Billboard Hot Country Singles & Tracks chart.

== Chart performance ==
Chart (1982)	Peak position
US Hot Country Songs (Billboard)	15
