= Surprise (Sylvia album) =

Studio album by Sylvia
- Released: March 1984
- Studios: Sound Stage; Woodland Sound Studios
- Genres: Country; country pop; rock
- Length: 33:14
- Label: RCA Victor
- Producer: Tom Collins

Sylvia chronology
Snapshot (1983)	Surprise (1984)	One Step Closer (1985)

Singles from Surprise
- 1. "Victims of Goodbye" Released: March 1984; 2. "Love Over Old Times" Released: June 1984

Surprise is a studio album by American singer, Sylvia, released by RCA Records in March 1984 and was her fourth studio album. Marketed in the country genre, it also included styles taken from country pop and rock. Ten tracks comprised the album, including two that reached top 40 US-Canadian country chart placements: "Victims of Goodbye" and "Love Over Old Times". The album received a mixed critical response, with some writers finding it lacked the country style of other recordings.

== Background, recording and content ==
According to Tom Roland of AllMusic, Sylvia's musical sound and career was driven by "catchy melodies and strong backbeats" that brought her a series of top ten US country hits during the 1980s, including the crossover pop song, "Nobody". Surprise was her fourth album and blended country with rock and pop. In an interview with the Bangor Daily News, she commented on the album's combination of styles: "I'm not a real hard-core country singer. I just like good music. I'm not going to stop any radio station from playing my songs just because they happen to be rock, or country." Surprise consisted of ten tracks, four of which were written by Dennis Morgan: the title track, "Give 'em Rhythm", "Unguarded Moments" and "Victims of Goodbye". Don Pfrimmer contributed to the writing of both "Unguarded Moments" and "Victims of Goodbye". The album was produced by Tom Collins and was recorded in sessions held at two studios: Sound Stage and Woodland Sound Studios.

== Critical reception ==
Surprise was given mixed reviews following its release. Cash Box found the album had "a fresh sound" and credited it to "some of Nashville's finest musicians" who played on the instrumentation. Jerry Sharpe of The Pittsburgh Press found Surprise lacked the country style despite being categorized in the genre, writing, "She doesn't sound country. There are no steel guitar or fiddle sounds in her backup music, there's no country sound in her voice, and her songs aren't about the time-honored subjects of mama, home, drinkin', cheatin' or underdogs." Yet, Sharpe also named Sylvia one of the "talented people who aren't traditional country" but "get a chance to make good." David Mulholland of the Ottawa Citizen called Sylvia "a good singer getting better", further writing, "Her voice has a much deeper texture reflecting a woman who's gone through some emotional ups and downs in the past couple of years." AllMusic only rated Surprise two out of five possible stars with no written review given.

== Release, chart performance and singles ==
Surprise was released by RCA Records in March 1984 and was originally offered in three formats: a vinyl LP, a cassette or a compact disc. It featured Sylvia with a new hairstyle on the album cover. It rose to the number 40 position on the US Billboard Top Country Albums chart, becoming Sylvia's first disc to peak outside the country top ten. It was also the second-lowest charting album on that chart in her career. It also rose to number 178 on the US Billboard 200 all-genre chart, Sylvia lowest-charting and last album to make the chart. Two singles were spawned from Surprise. Its lead release was "Victims of Goodbye", issued by RCA in March 1984. It reached number 24 on the US Hot Country Songs chart, number 19 on Canada's Country Tracks chart and number 44 on the US adult contemporary chart. Its second single was "Love Over Old Times" and it was released in June 1984. It rose to number 36 on the US country chart and number 50 on the Canadian country chart.

== Track listing ==
No.	Title	Writer(s)	Length
1.	"Give 'Em Rhythm"	Dennis Morgan, Stephen Allen Davis	2:55
2.	"Unguarded Moments"	Morgan; Don Pfrimmer	3:41
3.	"Victims of Goodbye"	Morgan; Pfrimmer	3:01
4.	"Isn't It Always Love"	Archie Jordan; Sue Sutton	2:23
5.	"Love Over Old Times"	Lisa Angelle; Mike Reid	3:35
6.	"I Just Don't Have The Heart"	Shireen Salyer; John Schweers	3:07
7.	"One Foot On The Street"	Steve Dean; Frank J. Myers	3:33
8.	"On The Other Side Of Midnight"	William T. Davidson	3:43
9.	"Surprise"	Kye Fleming; Morgan	3:26
10.	"It's Still There"	Jordan	3:50
Total length:			33:14

== Personnel ==
All credits are adapted from the liner notes of Surprise.

Musical personnel

- Kenneth Bell, Pete Bordonali, Larry Byrom, Jimmy Capps, Jon Goin, Dennis Morgan, Frank J. Myers – Guitar
- Sonny Garrish – Steel guitar
- Pete Bordonali – Mandolin
- David Hungate, Joe Osborn, Bob Wray – Bass
- David Briggs, Walt Cunningham, Bobby Ogdin, Alan Steinberger – Keyboards
- Eddie Bayers, James Stroud – Drums
- James Stroud – Percussion
- Nashville String Machine – String instrumentation
- The Cherry Sisters, Doug Clements, The Jordanaires, Dennis Wilson – Backing vocals

Technical personnel

- Way Bandy – Makeup
- Bill Brunt, Joe Osborn – Cover design
- Tom Collins – Producer
- Bob Graves, Tim Farmer – Assistant mixing engineer
- Les Ladd – Mixing engineer
- Francesco Scavullo – Photography
- Harry King – Hair
- Les Ladd, Brent King – Engineer
- Denny Purcell – Mastering
- Hogan Entertainment Design – Art direction
- Bergen White – Arrangement

== Chart performance ==
Chart (1984)	Peak position
US Billboard 200	178
US Top Country Albums (Billboard)	40

== Release history ==
Release history and formats for Surprise
Region	Date	Format	Label	Ref.
Various	March 1984	Vinyl LP; cassette; compact disc	RCA Records	
Various	2024	Digital download; streaming	Sony Music Entertainment	
