= Fooled by a Feeling =

Single by Barbara Mandrell

from the album Just for the Record
- B-side: "Love Takes a Long Time to Die"
- Released: July 30, 1979; re-released 1995
- Genre: Country
- Length: 2:57
- Label: MCA
- Songwriters: Kye Fleming, Dennis Morgan
- Producer: Tom Collins

Barbara Mandrell singles chronology
"(If Loving You Is Wrong) I Don't Want to Be Right" (1979)	"Fooled by a Feeling" (1979)	"Years" (1980)

"Fooled by a Feeling" is a song written by Kye Fleming and Dennis Morgan, and recorded by American country music artist Barbara Mandrell. It was released in July 1979 as the first single from the album Just for the Record. The song reached number 4 on the Billboard Hot Country Singles & Tracks chart.

== Chart performance ==
Chart (1979)	Peak position
US Hot Country Songs (Billboard)	4
US Adult Contemporary (Billboard)	26
US Billboard Hot 100	89
Canadian RPM Country Tracks	5
Canadian RPM Adult Contemporary	3
