= Wish You Were Here (Barbara Mandrell song) =

Single by Barbara Mandrell

from the album Barbara Mandrell Live
- B-side: "She's Out There Dancin' Alone"
- Released: August 31, 1981
- Genre: Country
- Length: 2:45
- Label: MCA
- Songwriter(s): Kye Fleming, Dennis Morgan
- Producer(s): Tom Collins

Barbara Mandrell singles chronology
"I Was Country When Country Wasn't Cool" (1981)	"Wish You Were Here" (1981)	"Till You're Gone" (1982)

"Wish You Were Here" is a song written by Kye Fleming and Dennis Morgan, and recorded by American country music artist Barbara Mandrell. It was released in August 1981 as the second and final single from her live album Barbara Mandrell Live. It peaked at number 2 on the U.S. Billboard Hot Country Singles chart and number 11 on the Canadian RPM Country Tracks chart.

== Chart performance ==
Chart (1981)	Peak position
US Hot Country Songs (Billboard)	2
US Adult Contemporary (Billboard)	40
Canadian RPM Country Tracks	11
