= Steve Wariner (album) =

Studio album by Steve Wariner
- Released: 1982
- Recorded: 1980–82
- Studio: The Music Mill (Nashville, Tennessee)
- Genre: Country pop
- Length: 36:18
- Label: RCA Nashville
- Producer: Tom Collins

Steve Wariner chronology
Steve Wariner (1982)	Midnight Fire (1983)

Singles from Steve Wariner
- 1. "Your Memory" Released: November 15, 1980; 2. "By Now" Released: April 11, 1981; 3. "All Roads Lead to You" Released: September 26, 1981; 4. "Kansas City Lights" Released: March 6, 1982; 5. "Don't It Break Your Heart" Released: July 1982; 6. "Don't Plan on Sleeping Tonight" Released: January 1983

Professional ratings
Review scores
Source	Rating
AllMusic	4.5/5 stars

Steve Wariner is the debut studio album by American country music artist Steve Wariner. It was released in 1982 by RCA Nashville. The album produced six singles overall on the Billboard Hot Country Singles chart including "All Roads Lead to You" which stayed at number one for one week and spent a total of twelve weeks on the chart.

== Track listing ==
No.	Title	Writer(s)	Length
1.	"Your Memory"	Charles Quillen, John Schweers	2:57
2.	"Don't Plan on Sleepin' Tonight"	Gloria Sklerov, Sam Kunin	3:38
3.	"We'll Never Know"	Steve Wariner	3:54
4.	"She Never Meant a Thing to Me"	Jack Tempchin, Chris Montan	3:16
5.	"Well, Hello Again"	Kye Fleming, Dennis Morgan	3:36
6.	"Don't It Break Your Heart"	Mack David, Archie Jordan	2:54
7.	"Kansas City Lights"	Fleming, Morgan	3:35
8.	"All Roads Lead to You"	Fleming, Morgan	3:32
9.	"By Now"	Dean Dillon, Don Pfrimmer, Quillen	2:56
10.	"Daybreak"	Schweers	3:01
Total length:			36:18

== Personnel ==
- Guitar: Jimmy Capps, Bruce Dees, Dennis Morgan, Fred Newell, Steve Wariner, Paul Yandell,
  Reggie Young. Steel Guitar: Sonny Garrish, John Hughey. Mandolin: Fred Newell
- Bass: Mike Leech, Joe Osborn
- Keyboards: David Briggs, Bobby Emmons, Shane Keister, Bobby Ogdin
- Drums: Buster Phillips, James Stroud
- Fiddle: Hoot Hester
- Strings: The Shelly Kurland Strings, The Nashville String Machine, Bergen White
- Backing Vocals: Lea Jane Berinati, Steve Brantley, Lori Brooks, The Cherry Sisters, Bruce Dees,
  Jim Glaser, George Grantham, Larry Keith, Louis Nunley, Charles Quillen, Sylvia Rutledge,
  Donna Sheridan, Gordon Stoker, Karen Taylor, Hurshel Wiginton, Marcia Wood

== Chart performance ==
=== Album ===
Chart (1982)	Peak position
U.S. Billboard Top Country Albums	35
