= 18th Academy of Country Music Awards =

US music awards ceremony in 1983

- Date: May 9, 1983
- Location: Knott's Berry Farm, Buena Park, California
- Hosted by: Jerry Reed; John Schneider; Tammy Wynette

Highlights
- Most wins: Alabama; Willie Nelson (2 each)
- Most nominations: Willie Nelson (5)

Television/radio coverage
- Network: NBC

The 18th Academy of Country Music Awards ceremony was held on May 9, 1983, at Knott's Berry Farm, Buena Park, California. It was hosted by Jerry Reed, John Schneider and Tammy Wynette.

== Winners and nominees ==
Winners are shown in bold.

Entertainer of the Year	Album of the Year
**Alabama**; Barbara Mandrell; Willie Nelson; Kenny Rogers; Ricky Skaggs	**Always on My Mind — Willie Nelson**; Listen to the Radio — Don Williams; Love Will Turn You Around — Kenny Rogers; Mountain Music — Alabama; Waitin' for the Sun to Shine — Ricky Skaggs
Top Female Vocalist of the Year	Top Male Vocalist of the Year
**Sylvia**; Rosanne Cash; Janie Fricke; Barbara Mandrell; Dottie West	**Ronnie Milsap**; Merle Haggard; Willie Nelson; Ricky Skaggs; Hank Williams Jr.
Top Vocal Group of the Year	Top Vocal Duo of the Year
**Alabama**; Larry Gatlin & the Gatlin Brothers; Oak Ridge Boys; Statler Brothers; The Whites	**David Frizzell** **and** **Shelly West**; Bellamy Brothers; Dean Dillon and Gary Stewart; Merle Haggard and George Jones; Waylon Jennings and Willie Nelson; Eddie Rabbit and Crystal Gayle
Single Record of the Year	Song of the Year
**"Always on My Mind"** — **Willie Nelson**; "Crying My Heart Out Over You" — Ricky Skaggs; "I'm Gonna Hire a Wino to Decorate Our Home" — David Frizzell; "Love Will Turn You Around" — Kenny Rogers; "Nobody" — Sylvia	**"Are the Good Times Really Over (I Wish a Buck Was Still Silver)"** — **Merle Haggard**; "I'm Gonna Hire a Wino to Decorate Our Home" — Dewayne Blackwell; "Nobody" — Kye Fleming, Dennis Morgan; "Ring on Her Finger, Time on Her Hands" — Pam Rose, Mary Ann Kennedy, Don Goodman; "She Got the Goldmine" — Tim DuBois
Top New Male Vocalist	Top New Female Vocalist
**Michael Martin Murphy**; Kieran Kane; Gary Morris; George Strait; Gary Wolf	**Karen Brooks**; Deborah Allen; Cindy Hurt; Sue Powell; Amy Wooley
Pioneer Award
**Chet Atkins**
Tex Ritter Award
**Best Little Whorehouse in Texas**

== Performers ==
Performer(s)	Song(s)
Roger Miller; Louise Mandrell; Mickey Gilley	Country Crossover Hits Medley "King of the Road" "Stand by Your Man" "Young Love" "Big Bad John" "Tennessee Waltz" "I Walk the Line" "Rhinestone Cowboy" "Rose Garden" "Sixteen Tons" "For the Good Times" "Help Me Make It Through the Night" "El Paso" "Blue Suede Shoes"
Jerry Reed	"Good Ole Boys"
Deborah Allen; Karen Brooks; Cindy Hurt; Sue Powell	Top New Female Vocalist Medley "Baby I Lied" "New Way Out" "I'm in Love All Over Again" "Let's Disappear"
Alabama	"Dixieland Delight"
Dottie West; Shelly West	"Mammas Don't Let Your Babies Grow Up to Be Cowboys"
Willie Nelson	"Why Do I Have to Choose"
Tammy Wynette	"I Just Heard a Heart Break (And I'm So Afraid It's Mine)"
T.G. Sheppard; David Frizzell; Sylvia; Lee Greenwood; Jerry Reed	Song of the Year Medley "Are the Good Times Really Over (I Wish a Buck Was Still Silver)" "I'm Gonna Hire a Wino to Decorate Our Home" "Nobody" "Ring on Her Finger, Time on Her Hands" "She Got the Goldmine"
John Schneider	"If You Believe"
George Strait; Kieran Kane; Gary Wolf; Gary Morris; Michael Martin Murphy	Top New Male Vocalist Medley "Amarillo by Morning" "It's You" "Livin' on Memories" "The Love She Found in Me" "What's Forever For"

== Presenters ==
Presenter(s)	Notes
Ricky Skaggs; Catherine Bach	Top Female Vocalist of the Year
Mr. T	Reads the Rules of the ACM Awards
Barbi Benton; Mel Tillis	Top Vocal Duo of the Year
Janie Fricke; Claude Akins	Album of the Year
Larry Gatlin & the Gatlin Brothers	Top New Female Vocalist
Glen Campbell	Presented Pioneer Award to Chet Atkins
Sonny James; Helen Reddy	Single Record of the Year
Lacy J. Dalton; George Peppard	Song of the Year
Bellamy Brothers; Heather Thomas	Top Vocal Group of the Year
Eddie Dean; Genie Francis	Top New Male Vocalist
Rosanne Cash; Tom Wopat	Top Male Vocalist of the Year
Lynn Anderson; Ricardo Montalban	Entertainer of the Year
