= Crackers (song) =

Single by Barbara Mandrell

from the album Love Is Fair
- B-side: "Using Him to Get to You"
- Released: June 16, 1980
- Genre: Country
- Length: 2:30
- Label: MCA
- Songwriter(s): Kye Fleming, Dennis Morgan
- Producer(s): Tom Collins

Barbara Mandrell singles chronology
"Years" (1979)	"Crackers" (1980)	"The Best of Strangers" (1980)

"Crackers" is a song written by Kye Fleming and Dennis Morgan, and recorded by American country music artist Barbara Mandrell. It was released in June 1980 as the lead single from the album Love Is Fair. It peaked at #3 on the U.S. Billboard Hot Country Singles chart and #6 on the Canadian RPM Country Tracks chart.

== Content ==
The song describes a woman asking for her ex-lover, who left her after a series of arguments, to come back, as being lonely is too much for her to bear. She decides that the arguments were over things that were trivial, among them eating crackers in bed, and promises that he will be allowed to have his way on them if he comes back.

== Charts ==
=== Weekly charts ===
Chart (1980)	Peak position
US Hot Country Songs (Billboard)	3
US Bubbling Under Hot 100 Singles (Billboard)	105
Canadian RPM Country Tracks	6

=== Year-end charts ===
Chart (1980)	Position
US Hot Country Songs (Billboard)	35
