= The Best of Strangers =

Single by Barbara Mandrell

from the album Love Is Fair
- B-side: "Sometime, Somewhere, Somehow"
- Released: September 29, 1980
- Genre: Country
- Length: 3:41
- Label: MCA
- Songwriter(s): Kye Fleming, Dennis Morgan
- Producer(s): Tom Collins

Barbara Mandrell singles chronology
"Crackers" (1980)	"The Best of Strangers" (1980)	"Love Is Fair" (1981)

"'The Best of Strangers" is a song written by Kye Fleming and Dennis Morgan, and recorded by American country music artist Barbara Mandrell. It was released in September 1980 as the second single from the album Love Is Fair. It peaked at number 6 on the U.S. Billboard Hot Country Singles chart and number 9 on the Canadian RPM Country Tracks chart.

== Chart performance ==
Chart (1980)	Peak position
US Hot Country Songs (Billboard)	6
Canadian RPM Country Tracks	9
