= Love Is Fair (song) =

Single by Barbara Mandrell

from the album Love Is Fair
- B-side: "Sometime, Somewhere, Somehow"
- Released: January 1981
- Genre: Country
- Length: 3:02
- Label: MCA
- Songwriter(s): Kye Fleming, Dennis Morgan
- Producer(s): Tom Collins

Barbara Mandrell singles chronology
| "The Best of Strangers" (1980) | "Love Is Fair" (1981) | "I Was Country When Country Wasn't Cool" (1981) |

"'Love Is Fair" is a song written by Kye Fleming and Dennis Morgan, and recorded by American country music artist Barbara Mandrell. It was released in January 1981 as the third and final single and title track from the album Love Is Fair. It peaked at number 13 on the U.S. Billboard Hot Country Singles chart and number 7 on the Canadian RPM Country Tracks chart.

== Chart performance ==
| Chart (1981) | Peak position |
|---|---|
| US Hot Country Songs (Billboard) | 13 |
| Canadian RPM Country Tracks | 7 |
