= You Don't Miss a Thing =

Single by Sylvia
- B-side: "Cry Baby Cry"
- Released: September 1979
- Genre: Country; adult contemporary
- Length: 2:33
- Label: RCA
- Songwriters: Kye Fleming; Dennis Morgan
- Producer: Tom Collins

Sylvia singles chronology
"You Don't Miss a Thing" (1979)	"It Don't Hurt to Dream" (1980)

"You Don't Miss a Thing" is a song written by Kye Fleming and Dennis Morgan, and recorded by American country music singer Sylvia. It was released in September 1979 as her debut single, reaching the US country top 40.

== Background, recording and content ==
Sylvia secured a recording contract with RCA Records through her association with producer, Tom Collins. In their first experience recording together, they cut the track "You Don't Miss a Thing". The song was co-written by Kye Fleming and Dennis Morgan, while Collins served as its sole record producer.

== Release, critical reception and chart performance ==
"You Don't Miss a Thing" was released by RCA Records in September 1979 as a seven-inch vinyl record. It featured a B-side titled, "Cry Baby Cry" (also penned by Fleming and Morgan). The song was the first single released in her career. Billboard noted the song had elements of adult contemporary in its production and had "strong percussion". It rose into the US Billboard Hot Country Songs top 40, rising to the number 36 position in 1979.

== Track listing ==
7" vinyl single

- "You Don't Miss a Thing" – 2:33
- "Cry Baby Cry" – 2:39

== Chart performance ==
Weekly chart performance for "You Don't Miss a Thing"
Chart (1979)	Peak position
US Hot Country Songs (Billboard)	36
