= Love Is Fair =

Love is Fair

Studio album by Barbara Mandrell
- Released: August 29, 1980
- Genre: Country
- Label: MCA Nashville
- Producer: Tom Collins

Barbara Mandrell chronology
The Best of Barbara Mandrell (1979)	Love is Fair (1980)	Barbara Mandrell Live (1981)

Singles from Love is Fair
- 1. "Crackers" Released: June 2, 1980; 2. "The Best of Strangers" Released: September 22, 1980; 3. "Love Is Fair" Released: January 19, 1981

Professional ratings
Review scores
Source	Rating
Allmusic	2.5/5 stars

Love is Fair is the 10th solo studio album by American country music singer, Barbara Mandrell, released in August 1980.

Love is Fair was Mandrell's first studio album of the decade. The album was successful for Mandrell, spawning four singles. The first single, "Crackers", peaked at #3 on the Country charts in 1980, and also charted on the Bubbling Under/Hot 100, her last single to chart there. The second single, "The Best of Strangers" was another Top 10 Country hit. The third single, "Love is Fair" peaked at #13 on the Country charts. The flip-side of that song, "Sometime, Somewhere, Somehow" charted on the Adult Contemporary charts in the Top 30. The album consisted of 10 tracks, including a cover of the Brenda Lee pop hit "Coming on Strong" and Michael Jackson's hit, "(S)He's Out of My Life".

Love Is Fair peaked at #6 on the Top Country Albums chart and also peaked at #175 on the Billboard 200, her fourth album to peak on the Billboard 200.

== Track listing ==
1. "Love Is Fair" (Dennis Morgan, Kye Fleming)
2. "Crackers" (Morgan, Fleming)
3. "He's Out of My Life" (Tom Bahler)
  - with Randy Wright
4. "Not Tonight, I've Got a Heartache" (David Powelson)
5. "Long Time, No Love" (Morgan, Fleming)
6. "The Best of Strangers" (Morgan, Fleming)
7. "Sometime, Somewhere, Somehow" (Brant Beene, Jack Turner)
8. "My Bonnie Lies Over and Over" (John Schweers, R. C. Bannon)
9. "I'm Afraid He'll Find You (Somewhere in My Heart)" (Kerry Chater, Mitch Johnson)
10. "Coming on Strong" (Little David Wilkins)

== Personnel ==
- Acoustic Guitar: Jimmy Capps, Fred Tackett
- Background Vocals: Lea Jane Berinati, Steve Brantley, Bruce Dees, Larry Keith, Dennis Morgan
- Bass guitar: Mike Leech, Bob Wray
- Drums: Larrie Londin, Kenny Malone, Buster Phillips
- Duet Vocals: Randy Wright on "He's Out of My Life"
- Electric guitar: Pete Bordonali, Bruce Dees, Fred Newell
- Electric Piano: Bobby Emmons, Bobby Ogdin
- Lead Vocals: Barbara Mandrell
- Piano: David Briggs
- Steel Guitar: John Hughey
- Strings: The Sheldon Kurland Strings
- String Arranger: Archie Jordan, Mike Leech
- Synthesizer: Tony Migliore

== Charts ==
=== Weekly charts ===
Chart (1980)	Peak position
Canadian Country Albums (RPM)	12
US Billboard 200	175
US Top Country Albums (Billboard)	6

=== Year-end charts ===
Chart (1981)	Position
US Top Country Albums (Billboard)	19

=== Singles ===
Year	Single	Peak chart positions		
Year	Single	US Country	US	CAN Country
1980	"Crackers"	3	105	6
1980	"The Best of Strangers"	6	—	9
1981	"Love Is Fair"	13	—	7
