= Like Nothing Ever Happened =

Single by Sylvia

from the album Just Sylvia
- B-side: "Drifter"
- Released: September 1982
- Genre: Country
- Length: 3:44
- Label: RCA Nashville
- Songwriter(s): Kye Fleming; Dennis Morgan
- Producer(s): Tom Collins

Sylvia singles chronology
"Nobody" (1982)	"Like Nothing Ever Happened" (1982)	"Snapshot" (1983)

"Like Nothing Ever Happened" is a song written by Kye Fleming and Dennis Morgan, and recorded by American country music artist Sylvia. It was released in September 1982 as the third single from her album Just Sylvia. The song reached #2 on the Billboard Hot Country Singles chart and #1 on the RPM Country Tracks chart in Canada.

== Charts ==
=== Weekly charts ===
Chart (1982–1983)	Peak position
US Hot Country Songs (Billboard)	2
Canadian RPM Country Tracks	1

=== Year-end charts ===
Chart (1983)	Position
US Hot Country Songs (Billboard)	45
