= Nothin' Ventured Nothin' Gained =

Single by Sylvia

from the album Knockin' Around (The Lost Album)
- B-side: "Come to Me"
- Released: June 1986
- Genre: Country; pop
- Length: 2:59
- Label: RCA
- Songwriters: Don Schlitz; Don Potter; Brent Maher
- Producers: Brent Maher; Don Potter

Sylvia singles chronology
"I Love You by Heart" (1985)	"Nothin' Ventured Nothin' Gained" (1986)	"Straight from My Heart" (1987)

"Nothin' Ventured Nothin' Gained" is a song written by Don Schlitz, Don Potter and Brent Maher, and recorded by American country music singer Sylvia. It was released in June 1986 as the only single from her album Knockin' Around (The Lost Album). The song made the US country songs top 40 and was her final top 40 release in her career. The song was originally planned to be included on Sylvia's studio album with producer, Brent Maher, but the album was shelved until 2024.

== Background and recording ==
In the 1980s, Sylvia had a series of US country pop top ten hits, including 1982's "Nobody", which crossed over onto the US pop charts. These recordings were produced by Tom Collins, and as the decade progressed, Sylvia became annoyed by her music's over-produced sound. She began working with Brent Maher in 1985 and he recorded two of her albums. The latter project was not released and featured on it was the tune, "Nothin' Ventured Nothin' Gained". The song was co-written by Don Schlitz, Don Potter and Brent Maher. Maher also produced the song alongside Potter.

== Release, critical reception and chart performance ==
"Nothin' Ventured Nothin' Gained" was released as a single by RCA Records in June 1986 and was distributed as a seven-inch vinyl record, featuring the B-side, "Come to Me". Billboard thought the song had an "acoustic" sound that had "positive but not cloying lyrics". Cash Box called it a "catchy" and "easy to like" song. It rose into the US Billboard Hot Country Songs top 40, peaking at number 33 in 1986, becoming Sylvia's final top 40 single there. The song was not released on a proper studio album until RCA and Legacy Recordings issued Sylvia's final album with the label in 2024 called Knockin' Around (The Lost Album).

== Track listing ==
7" vinyl single

- "Nothin' Ventured Nothin' Gained" – 2:59
- "Come to Me" – 3:42

== Chart performance ==
Weekly chart performance for "Nothin' Ventured Nothin' Gained"
Chart (1986)	Peak position
US Hot Country Songs (Billboard)	33
