= All Roads Lead to You =

Single by Steve Wariner

from the album Steve Wariner
- B-side: "Here We Are"
- Released: September 26, 1981 (U.S.)
- Recorded: 1981
- Genre: Country
- Length: 3:32
- Label: RCA Nashville
- Songwriters: Kye Fleming, Dennis Morgan
- Producer: Tom Collins

Steve Wariner singles chronology
| "By Now" (1981) | "All Roads Lead to You" (1981) | "Kansas City Lights" (1982) |

"All Roads Lead to You" is a song written by Kye Fleming and Dennis Morgan, and recorded by American country music artist Steve Wariner. It was released in September 1981 as the third single from the album Steve Wariner. The song was Wariner's third country hit and the first of nine number one country singles. The single stayed at number one for one week and spent a total of twelve weeks on the chart.

== Charts ==
| Chart (1981) | Peak position |
|---|---|
| US Hot Country Songs (Billboard) | 1 |
| US Bubbling Under Hot 100 (Billboard) | 7 |
| Canadian RPM Country Tracks | 19 |
