= Years (song) =

1979 single by Barbara Mandrell

Single by Barbara Mandrell

from the album Just for the Record
- B-side: "Darlin'"
- Released: December 7, 1979
- Genre: Country
- Length: 3:54
- Label: MCA
- Songwriters: Kye Fleming; Dennis Morgan
- Producer: Tom Collins

Barbara Mandrell singles chronology
"Fooled by a Feeling" (1979)	"Years" (1979)	"Crackers" (1980)

"Years" is a song written by Kye Fleming and Dennis Morgan, and recorded by American country music artist Barbara Mandrell. It was released in December 1979 as the second single from the album Just for the Record. The song was Mandrell's third number one on the country chart. It stayed at number one for a single week and spent a total of ten weeks in the country top 40.

== Charts ==
=== Weekly charts ===
Chart (1979–1980)	Peak position
US Hot Country Songs (Billboard)	1
US Billboard Hot 100	102
US Adult Contemporary (Billboard)	23
Canadian RPM Country Tracks	1
Canadian RPM Adult Contemporary Tracks	1

=== Year-end charts ===
Chart (1980)	Position
US Hot Country Songs (Billboard)	31

== Wayne Newton cover ==
"Years"

Single by Wayne Newton

from the album Night Eagle I
- B-side: "Rhythm Rhapsody"
- Released: January 1980
- Recorded: 1979
- Genre: Easy listening
- Length: 3:38
- Label: Aries II
- Songwriters: Kye Fleming; Dennis Morgan
- Producer: Tom Collins

Wayne Newton singles chronology
"I Apologize" (1979)	"Years" (1980)	"While the Feeling's Good (with Tammy Wynette)" (1989)

A cover version by Wayne Newton was released as a single in 1980 and reached No. 35 on the Billboard Hot 100, his last top 40 hit.
