= Heart on the Mend =

Single by Sylvia

from the album Drifter
- B-side: "Rainbow Rider"
- Released: September 12, 1981
- Genre: Country
- Length: 3:11
- Label: RCA Nashville
- Songwriter(s): Kye Fleming, Dennis Morgan
- Producer(s): Tom Collins

Sylvia singles chronology
"The Matador" (1981)	"Heart on the Mend" (1981)	"Sweet Yesterday" (1981)

"Heart on the Mend" is a song written by Kye Fleming and Dennis Morgan, and recorded by American country music artist Sylvia. It was released in September 1981 as the fifth single from the album Drifter. The song reached #8 on the Billboard Hot Country Singles & Tracks chart.

== Content ==
The song focuses on a woman who runs into an old lover in a honky tonk and hides her feelings for him, despite her heart still being broken and on the mend.

== Chart performance ==
Chart (1981)	Peak position
US Hot Country Songs (Billboard)	8
Canadian RPM Country Tracks	11
