= By Now =

1981 single by Steve Wariner

Single by Steve Wariner

from the album Steve Wariner
- B-side: "Beverly (Take Care of Your Baby)"
- Released: April 11, 1981
- Genre: Country
- Length: 2:54
- Label: RCA Nashville
- Songwriter(s): Dean Dillon, Don Pfrimmer, Charles Quillen
- Producer(s): Tom Collins

Steve Wariner singles chronology
"Your Memory" (1980)	"By Now" (1981)	"All Roads Lead to You" (1981)

"By Now" is a song written by Dean Dillon, Don Pfrimmer and Charles Quillen, and recorded by American country music artist Steve Wariner. It was released in April 1981 as the second single from the album Steve Wariner. The song reached number 6 on the Billboard Hot Country Singles & Tracks chart.

== Chart performance ==
Chart (1981)	Peak position
US Hot Country Songs (Billboard)	6
Canadian RPM Country Tracks	50
