= Live (Barbara Mandrell album) =

1981 live album by Barbara Mandrell

Live album by Barbara Mandrell
- Released: August 7, 1981
- Genre: Country pop
- Label: MCA Nashville
- Producer: Tom Collins

Barbara Mandrell chronology
Love Is Fair (1980)	Live (1981)	...In Black & White (1982)

Singles from Live
- 1. "I Was Country When Country Wasn't Cool" Released: April 20, 1981; 2. "Wish You Were Here" Released: August 17, 1981

Professional ratings
Review scores
Source	Rating
AllMusic	3/5 stars

Live is a live album by the American country music singer Barbara Mandrell, released in August 1981.

This album spawned two hit singles, "I Was Country When Country Wasn't Cool" and "Wish You Were Here". "I Was Country When Country Wasn't Cool" became Mandrell's signature song, and a return to her roots, peaking at #1 on the Billboard Country Singles chart in 1981. The song features an uncredited appearance by George Jones. "Wish You Were Here" peaked at #2 on the Billboard country charts, and also appeared on the (Billboard) Adult Contemporary charts, reaching #40. The album includes cover versions of popular songs, including "The Battle Hymn of the Republic" and the Hank Williams' hit "Hey Good Lookin'", and closes with a full-length vocal version of "Country Girl", the theme song to Mandrell's 1980-82 television show, Barbara Mandrell and the Mandrell Sisters.

This album was one of Mandrell's biggest-selling albums in the United States, receiving a "Gold" certification by the RIAA, after the album moved 500,000 copies. It is only one of two albums by Mandrell that received a certification by the RIAA in the United States. The album peaked at #4 on the Billboard Top Country Albums chart (her highest peak position on that chart), as well as #86 on the Billboard 200.

== Track listing ==
1. "Intro... / Sleeping Single in a Double Bed"
2. "Unsung Heroes"
3. "She's Out There Dancing Alone"
4. "Doin' It Right"
5. "Years / Love Is Fair"
6. "Hey Good Lookin'"
7. "Wish You Were Here"
8. "Instrumental Medley: Mountain Dew / Fireball Mail / Old Joe Clark / Uncle Joe's Boogie"
9. "In My Heart"
10. "I Was Country When Country Wasn't Cool" (featuring George Jones)
11. "The Battle Hymn of the Republic"
12. "Country Girl"

== Personnel ==
=== All tracks except 10 ===
- Charlie Bundy - bass guitar, background vocals
- Mike Jones - steel guitar, mandolin
- Barbara Mandrell - banjo, double-neck guitar, Dobro, mandolin, steel guitar, saxophone, lead vocals
- Gene Miller - acoustic guitar, electric guitar, background vocals
- Gary Smith - piano, electric piano, synthesizer, background vocals
- Lonnie Webb - synthesizer, background vocals
- Randy Wright - drums, background vocals

=== Track 10 ===
- Mike Baird - drums
- Anita Ball - background vocals
- Lea Jane Berinati - background vocals
- David Briggs - piano
- Jimmy Capps - acoustic guitar
- Sonny Garrish - steel guitar
- Vicki Hampton - background vocals
- George Jones - featured vocals
- Barbara Mandrell - lead vocals
- Charlie McCoy - harmonica, vibraphone
- Farrell Morris - percussion
- Fred Newell - electric guitar, banjo
- Neil Stubenhaus - bass guitar
- Fred Tackett - acoustic guitar
- Marty Walsh - electric guitar

== Charts ==
=== Weekly charts ===
Chart (1981)	Peak position
US Billboard 200	86
US Top Country Albums (Billboard)	4

=== Year-end charts ===
Chart (1982)	Position
US Top Country Albums (Billboard)	40

=== Singles ===
Year	Single	Peak chart positions		
Year	Single	US Country	US AC	CAN Country
1981	"I Was Country When Country Wasn't Cool"	1	—	14
1981	"Wish You Were Here"	2	40	11

== Certifications ==
Region	Certification	Certified units/sales
United States (RIAA)	Gold	500,000^{^}
^{^} Shipments figures based on certification alone.
