= Drifter (album) =

Studio album by Sylvia
- Released: April 1981
- Studios: Music City Music Hall; Woodland Sound Studios
- Genres: Country; western; country pop
- Label: RCA Victor
- Producer: Tom Collins

Sylvia chronology
Drifter (1981)	Just Sylvia (1982)

Singles from Drifter
- 1. "It Don't Hurt to Dream" Released: January 1980; 2. "Tumbleweed" Released: September 1980; 3. "Drifter" Released: January 1981; 4. "The Matador" Released: April 1981; 5. "Heart on the Mend" Released: September 1981

Drifter is a studio album by American singer, Sylvia, released by RCA Records in April 1981 and was the debut studio album of her career. A total of ten songs comprised the album which all incorporated a cowboy-western style along with country pop production. The album was given positive reception by newspapers and critics for its characteristic musical style. Five singles were part of the album, including the title track, which topped the US country chart and three more US-Canadian top ten country songs: "Tumbleweed", "The Matador" and "Heart on the Mend".

== Background, recording and content ==
Sylvia Kirby was working as a secretary for PiGem music aspiring to become a country music artist. Through the help of her boss, Tom Collins, she eventually signed a contract with RCA Records in 1979 and had her first single on the US country chart in 1979. She reached the US country top ten in 1980 with the song, "Tumbleweed", whose sound and lyrics would help craft her debut studio album, Drifter. The project was produced by Collins and recording sessions were held at two separate studios in Nashville, Tennessee: Music City Music Hall and Woodland Sound Studios.

Drifter consisted of ten tracks with story lines centered on the American west and was described by Sylvia herself as having a "prairie" feel. It also incorporated percussion and string orchestration that adapted it towards a modern country pop sound. It featured both ballads and uptempo material, as Sylvia was working dance halls and needed "danceable" songs to perform. Six of the tracks were penned by songwriting team, Kye Fleming and Dennis Morgan: "Tumbleweed", "I'm Going with Him", "It Don't Hurt to Dream", "Whipporwill", "Heart on the Mend" and "Cry Baby Cry".

== Critical reception ==
Drifter was met with mostly positive reception from music critics and writers. Steve Weiss compared Sylvia's voice to that of Crystal Gayle's and praised its production, noting the "whining steel guitar" on songs like "Tumbleweed". Weiss then concluded, "Unless her future musical efforts get cluttered by overproduction and syrupy crossover material, Sylvia will be a name for country fans to remember." Jerry Sharpe of The Pittsburgh Press found songs like "Tumbleweed" and "Whipporwill" are "worth a listen" and called "The Matador" both "highly unusual" and "excellent". Cash Box magazine believed the project could be categorized as "cowgirl" with its choice of western material and also believed it had crossover chart potential. "The young lady is definitely hot property right now, and she's only going to get hotter," they concluded. Record World called it "a solid package" that will attract listeners through the success of its singles.

== Release, chart performance and singles ==
Drifter was released by RCA Records in April 1981 and was the debut studio album of Sylvia's career. It was distributed in three formats: a vinyl LP, cassette or a 8-track cartridge. Drifter reached the top ten of the US Billboard Top Country Albums chart, rising to the number ten position in 1981, becoming one of three albums in her career to reach the top ten. It also made the US Billboard 200 all-genre chart, peaking at number 140, becoming one of four albums to make the chart in her career.

A total of five singles were either included or spawned from the album. Its earliest single was "It Don't Hurt to Dream", which was released by RCA in April 1980. It made the US Hot Country Songs top 40, peaking at number 35 that year. It was followed by in September 1980 by the release of "Tumbleweed" which reached the number ten position on the Hot Country Songs chart. The title track was issued as the next single in January 1981 and became Sylvia's first number one single on the Hot Country Songs chart and also reached number 13 on the Canadian RPM Country Tracks chart. The fourth single spawned from the LP was "The Matador" in April 1981, and it reached the top ten on both the US and Canadian country charts. The fifth and final single was spawned in September 1981: "Heart on the Mend". It reached number eight on the US Country chart and number 11 on the Canadian country chart.

== Track listing ==
All tracks written by Kye Fleming and Dennis Morgan, except where noted.

Drifter
No.	Title	Writer(s)	Length
1.	"Drifter"	Don Pfrimmer; Archie Jordan	2:25
2.	"Tumbleweed"		3:11
3.	"I'm Going with Him"		3:19
4.	"It Don't Hurt to Dream"	Charles Quillen; D. Pate; J. Pate	2:39
5.	"The Matador"	Bob Morris; Pfrimmer	3:15
6.	"Whippoorwill"		3:23
7.	"Heart on the Mend"		3:04
8.	"Cry Baby Cry"		2:39
9.	"Missin' You"		2:41
10.	"Rainbow Rider"	Klang	2:52

== Personnel ==
All credits are adapted from the liner notes of Drifter.

Musical personnel

- Sylvia – lead vocals, harmony vocals
- Jimmy Capps, Dennis Morgan, Dale Sellers, Paul Worley – acoustic guitar
- Jim Glaser, The Jordanaires, Louis Dean Nunley, The Lea Jane Singers, Gordon Stoker, Hurshel Winginton – backing vocals
- Mike Leech – bass guitar
- Gene Christman, Larrie Londin, Buster Phillips – drums
- Bruce Dees, Fred Newell, Brent Rowan, Billy Sanford – electric guitar
- Tommy Williams – fiddle
- David Briggs, Bobby Emmons, Bobby Ogdin – piano
- John Hughey – steel guitar
- The Sheldon Kurland Strings – strings (tracks 1,3,4,5,10)
- Bergen White – string arrangements

Technical personnel

- Tom Collins – producer
- Bill Harris – recording engineer
- David Hogan – art direction
- Denny Purcell – percussion
- Dick Zimmerman – photography

== Chart performance ==
Chart (1981)	Peak position
US Billboard 200	139
US Top Country Albums (Billboard)	10

== Release history ==
Release history and formats for Drifter
Region	Date	Format	Label	Ref.
Various	April 1981	Vinyl LP; cassette; 8-track cartridge	RCA Records	
United States	2016	Compact disc	RCA Records	
Various	2024	Digital download; streaming	Sony Music Entertainment	
