= Snapshot (Sylvia song) =

Single by Sylvia

from the album Snapshot
- B-side: "Tonight I'm Gettin' Friendly with the Blues"
- Released: May 7, 1983
- Genre: Country
- Length: 3:41
- Label: RCA Nashville
- Songwriter(s): Kye Fleming, Dennis Morgan
- Producer(s): Tom Collins

Sylvia singles chronology
"Like Nothing Ever Happened" (1982)	"Snapshot" (1983)	"The Boy Gets Around" (1983)

"Snapshot" is a song written by Kye Fleming and Dennis Morgan, and recorded by American country music artist Sylvia. It was released in May 1983 as the first single and title track from the album Snapshot. The song reached #5 on the Billboard Hot Country Singles & Tracks chart.

== Content ==
The song focuses on a woman who finds her lover cheating through a snapshot which "he doesn't know I've got" as he successfully covers all the evidence except for the photo, which she happens to find.

== Chart performance ==
Chart (1983)	Peak position
US Hot Country Songs (Billboard)	5
Canadian RPM Country Tracks	3
