= Your Memory =

Single by Steve Wariner

from the album Steve Wariner
- B-side: "Vince"
- Released: November 15, 1980
- Genre: Country
- Length: 2:55
- Label: RCA Nashville
- Songwriter(s): Charles Quillen, John Schweers
- Producer(s): Tom Collins

Steve Wariner singles chronology
"The Easy Part's Over" (1980)	"Your Memory" (1980)	"By Now" (1981)

"Your Memory" is a song written by Charles Quillen and John Schweers, and recorded by American country music artist Steve Wariner. It was released in November 1980 as the first single from the album Steve Wariner. The song reached number 7 on the Billboard Hot Country Singles & Tracks chart.

== Content ==
The song was one of the first collaborations between Charles Quillen and John Schweers, two Nashville-based songwriters. It is composed in the key of E major, with a main chord pattern of E-Bm-E-AM7-Am6-E-F♯m-B.

== Chart performance ==
Chart (1980–1981)	Peak position
US Hot Country Songs (Billboard)	7
