= I Was Country When Country Wasn't Cool =

Single by Barbara Mandrell

from the album Barbara Mandrell Live
- B-side: "A Woman's Got a Right (To Change His Mind)"
- Released: April 16, 1981
- Recorded: c. March 1981; Nashville, Tennessee
- Genre: Country pop
- Length: 3:40
- Label: MCA
- Songwriters: Kye Fleming; Dennis Morgan
- Producer: Tom Collins

Barbara Mandrell singles chronology
"Love Is Fair" (1981)	"I Was Country When Country Wasn't Cool" (1981)	"Wish You Were Here" (1981)

"I Was Country When Country Wasn't Cool" is a song written by Kye Fleming and Dennis Morgan, and recorded by American country music artist Barbara Mandrell. It was released in April 1981 as the lead single from the album Barbara Mandrell Live. It featured an uncredited guest appearance by country artist George Jones. The song reached number one on the U.S. Billboard Hot Country Singles chart in July 1981 and peaked at #14 on the Canadian RPM Country Tracks chart. The song was nominated for 1981 Single of the Year by both the CMA and ACM Awards organizations.

== Background and context ==
"I Was Country When Country Wasn't Cool" was a song produced by Tom Collins. Mandrell recorded the song as a "live" performance; but in actuality, the track was recorded in the studio with an audience applause track inserted over various sections of the song to fit into the context of the forthcoming live album. The song also featured an uncredited guest appearance on part of the chorus by country vocalist George Jones. The song was released during a period of rapid growth in the popularity of country music related to a dance-focused form of the genre called neocountry that was popularized, in part, by the movie Urban Cowboy. In the song, the singer explains her relationship with country music as being authentic and part of long tradition, and not a part of some fad or, worse, something that's merely "cool."

I was country when country wasn't cool
I was country from my hat down to my boots
I still act and look the same
What you see ain't nothing new
I was country when country wasn't cool

The song was the first track released from Mandrell's 1981 "Live" album. Unlike the studio single version, the album version of the song was recorded during a live concert at the Roy Acuff Theater of Opryland in Nashville, Tennessee. Applause from the audience can be heard in the beginning and end of the song, as well as when Jones makes his guest performance and when Mandrell refers to Jones in the lyrics in the early part of the song.

== Commercial performance ==
"I Was Country When Country Wasn't Cool" was released as Mandrell's second single of the year in mid 1981. The song became a major hit shortly after its release, reaching number one on the Billboard Magazine Hot Country Songs chart on July 4 of that year. George Jones was never credited as a featured vocalist on the recording charts at the time of its release. It has since been considered to be one of Mandrell's signature recordings during her career. The single helped her 1981 live album, Barbara Mandrell Live certify gold by the Recording Industry Association of America and also helped her win the Country Music Association's "Entertainer of the Year" award in 1981.

== Charts ==
Chart (1981)	Peak position
Canadian RPM Country Tracks	14
US Hot Country Songs (Billboard)	1
US Cash Box Top 100	95

== Parodies ==
- Dave Dudley, a country music artist of the 1960s and 1970s, recorded an answer song called "I Was Country Before Barbara Mandrell". The lyrics are a response to the then-prevalent "urban cowboy" style of country music and suggest that artists like Mandrell were cashing in on the style's popularity, all while he and fellow artists were genuinely country. The song, released later in 1982 as a double-sided single record, failed to appear on the Hot Country Singles chart.
- American country music parody artist Cledus T. Judd released a parody of "I Was Country When Country Wasn't Cool" titled "I Was Country When Country Wasn't Pop" (which features Jones) on his 2003 album A Six Pack of Judd.
- Cartoonist Al Columbia alluded to the song in the title of his 1995 comic story "I Was Killing When Killing Wasn't Cool".
