= Sweet Yesterday =

Single by Sylvia

from the album Just Sylvia
- B-side: "I Feel Cheated"
- Released: January 16, 1982
- Genre: Country
- Length: 3:45
- Label: RCA Nashville
- Songwriter(s): Kye Fleming, Dennis Morgan
- Producer(s): Tom Collins

Sylvia singles chronology
"Heart on the Mend" (1981)	"Sweet Yesterday" (1982)	"Nobody" (1982)

"Sweet Yesterday" is a song written by Kye Fleming and Dennis Morgan and recorded by American country music artist Sylvia. It was released in January 1982 as the first single from the album Just Sylvia. The song reached #12 on the Billboard Hot Country Singles & Tracks chart.

== Chart performance ==
Chart (1982)	Peak position
US Hot Country Songs (Billboard)	12
Canadian RPM Country Tracks	11
