= One Step Closer (Sylvia album) =

Studio album by Sylvia
- Released: February 1985
- Studio: Creative Workshop
- Genres: Country; soft rock
- Length: 36:06
- Label: RCA Victor
- Producer: Brent Maher

Sylvia chronology
Surprise (1984)	One Step Closer (1985)	Greatest Hits (1987)

Singles from One Step Closer
- 1. "Fallin' in Love" Released: January 1985; 2. "Cry Just a Little Bit" Released: June 1985; 3. "I Love You by Heart" Released: November 1985

One Step Closer is a studio album by American singer, Sylvia, released by RCA Records in February 1985 and was the fifth studio album of her career. The project was her first produced by Brent Maher after desiring a more traditional sound and style in her record production. Despite this musical vision, critics noticed a soft rock style versus traditional country. Three singles spawned from the album reached the top 10 on both the US and Canadian country song charts: "Fallin' in Love", "Cry Just a Little Bit" and a duet with Michael Johnson titled "I Love You by Heart".

== Background ==
Sylvia found country music success in the early 1980s with music that incorporated "catchy melodies and strong backbeats", according to AllMusic's Tom Roland. This production style brought her the crossover hit "Nobody" in 1982 and several more top-10 US country songs during that period. However, Sylvia grew tired of the sound and lyrical content by the middle 1980s and instead wanted to record an album that had a more traditional music style to it. In November 1984, Record World announced that Sylvia had teamed up with Brent Maher, responsible for also producing The Judds.

== Recording and content ==
In interviewing Sylvia, The Bradenton Herald reported that Maher helped bring a traditional country sound to the album by bringing in a "simple" and "earthy sound" that shed more light on the "songs, vocals and their interpretations". Sylvia herself was quoted in saying, "As I get older, I get more settled into my music. This [album] is exactly what I wanted." One Step Closer was recorded at the Creative Workshop (with Maher acting as the album's sole producer) and consisted of ten tracks in total. A mixture of uptempo and ballad selections complete the track listing. Uptempo songs include "Fallin' in Love" and "Cry Just a Little Bit". while the ballads include "Breakin' It" and "True Blue". Also featured on the project is duet with 1970s singer Michael Johnson titled "I Love You by Heart".

== Critical reception ==
One Step Closer received mixed reviews from writers and critics. Jerry Sharpe of The Pittsburgh Press found the album to be closer to soft rock than country in sound. "Although Sylvia isn't any more country than a Manhattan subway, she turns out top notch music," he commented. Billboard gave the project a mixed response, writing, "Teamed with a new producer, Sylvia has brisker and more imaginative arrangements to work with then on previous albums. But she still shows a dismaying preference in lyrics for the spongy over the substantial." Although no formal review was provided, AllMusic rated the album only two out of five stars.

== Release, chart performance and singles ==
One Step Closer was released by RCA Records in February 1985 and was her fifth studio album. The label offered the project in three separate formats: a vinyl LP, a cassette or a compact disc. It was Sylvia's fifth album to make the US Billboard Top Country Albums chart, reaching the number 19 position. It was also one of her final albums to make the list. Three singles were spawned from One Step Closer. Its lead release was "Fallin' in Love", issued by RCA in January 1985. It reached the number two spot on the US Hot Country Songs chart and number one on the Canadian Country Tracks chart. It was followed in June 1985 by the release of "Cry Just a Little Bit", which reached number nine on the US country chart and number eight on the Canadian country chart. The final single spawned from One Step Closer was "I Love You by Heart" in November 1985, another number nine placement on the US country chart and number seven on the Canadian country chart.

== Track listing ==
No.	Title	Writer(s)	Length
1.	"Fallin' in Love"	Randy Goodrum; Brent Maher	2:55
2.	"One Step Closer"	Craig Bickhardt; Maher	3:18
3.	"Breakin' It"	Mark Germino	3:49
4.	"Cry Just a Little Bit"	Bob Heatlie	2:56
5.	"I Can't Help the Way That I Don't Feel"	Chris Waters; Michael Garvin; Tom Shapiro	4:50
6.	"Read All About It"	Kent Robbins; Todd Cerney	3:29
7.	"Only the Shadows Know"	Robbins; David Gibson	3:59
8.	"I Love You by Heart" (duet with Michael Johnson)	Jerry Gillespie; Stan Webb	3:15
9.	"True Blue"	Holly Dunn; Madeline Stone	3:01
10.	"Eyes Like Mine"	Gary Burr	3:49

== Personnel ==
All credits are adapted from the liner notes of One Step Closer.

- Sylvia – lead vocals
- Eddie Bayers – drums
- Larry Byrom – acoustic guitar, electric guitar, electric guitar solos
- Quitman Dennis – tenor saxophone
- Sonny Garrish – steel guitar
- Jon Goin – electric guitar
- Bobby Ogdin – keyboards
- Don Potter – acoustic guitar
- Tom Rutledge – acoustic guitar
- Jack Williams – bass guitar

== Chart performance ==
Chart (1985)	Peak position
US Top Country Albums (Billboard)	19

== Release history ==
Release history and formats for One Step Closer
Region	Date	Format	Label	Ref.
Various	February 1985	Vinyl LP; cassette; compact disc	RCA Records	
Various	2024	Music download; streaming	Sony Music Entertainment	
