= It Don't Hurt to Dream =

Single by Sylvia

from the album Drifter
- B-side: "No News Is Good News"
- Released: April 1980
- Genre: Country
- Length: 2:39
- Label: RCA
- Songwriters: Charles Quillen; Dan Pate; Jane Pate
- Producer: Tom Collins

Sylvia singles chronology
"You Don't Miss a Thing" (1979)	"It Don't Hurt to Dream" (1980)	"Tumbleweed" (1980)

"It Don't Hurt to Dream" is a song written by Charles Quillen, Dan Pate and Jane Pate,and recorded by American country music singer, Sylvia. It was released as in April 1980 as the lead single from her album Drfiter. It was the second single of her career.

== Background and recording ==
Under the production of producer Tom Collins, Sylvia began recording for RCA Records in 1979. Her first single was released the same year titled, "You Don't Miss a Thing". It would be followed in 1980 by "It Don't Hurt to Dream". The tune was co-composed by Nashville songwriters: Charles Quillen (from Chess Music) and Dan Pate and Jane Pate (from Pi-Gem Music). The track was produced entirely by Tom Collins.

== Release, critical reception and chart performance ==
"It Don't Hurt to Dream" was issued as a single by RCA Records in April 1980 as a seven-inch vinyl record. It featured a B-side titled "No News Is Good News" and was the second single in Sylvia's career. No formal review was given, but Cash Box listed it among its "Singles to Watch" in April 1980. It rose into the top 40 of the US Billboard Hot Country Songs chart in 1980, peaking at the number 35 position. It became Sylvia's second charting single and second to make the US Billboard country top 40. It was later featured on her debut studio album by RCA titled Drifter.

== Track listing ==
7" vinyl single

- "It Don't Hurt to Dream" – 2:39
- "No News Is Good News" – 2:50

== Chart performance ==
Weekly chart performance for "It Don't Hurt to Dream"
Chart (1980)	Peak position
US Hot Country Songs (Billboard)	35
