= I Never Quite Got Back (From Loving You) =

Single by Sylvia

from the album Snapshot
- B-side: "So Complete"
- Released: December 3, 1983
- Genre: Country
- Length: 3:36
- Label: RCA Nashville
- Songwriter(s): Mike Reid, Don Pfrimmer
- Producer(s): Tom Collins

Sylvia singles chronology
"The Boy Gets Around" (1983)	"I Never Quite Got Back (From Loving You)" (1983)	"Victims of Goodbye" (1984)

"I Never Quite Got Back (From Loving You)" is a song recorded by American country music artist Sylvia. It was released in December 1983 as the third single from the album Snapshot. The song reached #3 on the Billboard Hot Country Singles & Tracks chart. The song was written by Mike Reid and Don Pfrimmer.

== Content ==
The songs narrator speaks of still being in love with a man who has left her for someone new.

== Chart performance ==
Chart (1983–1984)	Peak position
US Hot Country Songs (Billboard)	3
Canadian RPM Country Tracks	2
