= Nashville Songwriters Foundation =

Non-profit music organization

The Nashville Songwriters Foundation is a non-profit organization foundation for the Nashville music community. Songwriters are inducted into the Nashville Songwriters Hall of Fame each year and the foundation's purpose is to "educate, archive, and celebrate the contributions of the members of the Nashville Songwriters Hall of Fame to the world of music."

As of 2022, the chair of the board of NSF is Sarah Cates.
