= The Real Story (album) =

Studio album by Sylvia
- Released: November 11, 1996
- Genre: Country
- Length: 44:57
- Producer: John Mock

Sylvia chronology
Greatest Hits (1987)	The Real Story (1996)	Where in the World (2002)

Professional ratings
Review scores
Source	Rating
AllMusic	2.5/5 stars

The Real Story is Sylvia's first independent album from her own label, Red Pony Records, and her first album in eleven years.

== Track listing ==
No.	Title	Writer(s)	Length
1.	"Soon as I Find My Voice"	Cheryl Wheeler	3:49
2.	"I've Been Down Too Long"	Tony Arata	4:02
3.	"Chance Encounter"	Sylvia Hutton; Craig Bickhardt; Kent Robbins	3:13
4.	"Hand-Me-Down"	Sylvia Hutton; Craig Bickhardt	2:56
5.	"Even a Cowboy Can Dream"	Craig Bickhardt	3:45
6.	"See How Much I Love You"	Kent Robbins	3:50
7.	"Sweet Shall Your Welcome Be"	Sylvia Hutton; Verlon Thompson	2:35
8.	"The Real Story"	Sylvia Hutton; Craig Bickhardt	4:06
9.	"Whole Heart"	Sylvia Hutton; Kent Robbins	3:10
10.	"Thank God I'm Coming Home"	Sylvia Hutton; Verlon Thompson	3:20
11.	"(I Love You) More Than It Has Ever Rained"	Sylvia Hutton; Verlon Thompson	3:21
12.	"Sonoma"	Craig Bickhardt	3:44
13.	"I Will Not Forget You"	Lee Satterfield; George Teren	3:06
Total length:			44:57

== Personnel ==
- Sylvia - vocal harmony, vocals
- John Mock - acoustic guitar, classical guitar, electric guitar, mandolin, string arrangements, tin whistle
- Craig Bickhardt - acoustic guitar, vocal harmony
- John Catchings - cello
- David Davidson - violin
- Randy Hardison - drums
- Kirk Johnson - harmonica
- Kenny Malone - drums
- Matt McGee - bass
- Richard McLaurin - lap steel guitar
- Craig Nelson - acoustic bass
- Clara Olson - violin
- Tom Roady - congas, percussion, timbales
- Lee Satterfield - vocal harmony
- Steven Sheehan - acoustic guitar
- Catherine Styron - piano
- Kristin Wilkinson - viola

== Production ==
- John Mock: Producer
- Sylvia: Producer

All track information and credits were taken from the CD liner notes.
