= I Love You by Heart =

Single by Sylvia with Michael Johnson

from the album One Step Closer
- B-side: "Eyes Like Mine"
- Released: November 16, 1985
- Genre: Country
- Length: 3:17
- Label: RCA Nashville
- Songwriter(s): Jerry Gillespie, Stan Webb
- Producer(s): Brent Maher

Sylvia singles chronology
"Cry Just a Little Bit" (1985)	"I Love You by Heart" (1985)	"Nothin' Ventured Nothin' Gained" (1986)

Michael Johnson singles chronology
"You Can Call Me Blue" (1980)	"I Love You by Heart" (1985)	"Gotta Learn to Love Without You" (1986)

"I Love You by Heart" is a song written by Jerry Gillespie and Stan Webb, and recorded by American country music artists Sylvia and Michael Johnson. It was released in November 1985 as the third single from the album One Step Closer. The song reached #9 on the Billboard Hot Country Singles & Tracks chart.

The song was Sylvia's last top 10 hit on the Hot Country Singles chart, and the first for Johnson, who had enjoyed success in mainstream pop music in the late 1970s and early 1980s, charting several songs that reached the top 20 of the Billboard Hot 100 chart. While Sylvia had only one other top 40 country hit, Johnson went on to be a consistent hitmaker for the next few years, reaching No. 1 in 1987 with "Give Me Wings" and "The Moon Is Still Over Her Shoulder."

== Chart performance ==
Chart (1985–1986)	Peak position
US Hot Country Songs (Billboard)	9
Canadian RPM Country Tracks	7
