= The Matador (Sylvia song) =

Single by Sylvia

from the album Drifter
- B-side: "Cry Baby Cry"
- Released: April 25, 1981
- Genre: Country
- Length: 3:15
- Label: RCA Nashville
- Songwriter(s): Don Pfrimmer, Bob Morris
- Producer(s): Tom Collins

Sylvia singles chronology
"Drifter" (1981)	"The Matador" (1981)	"Heart on the Mend" (1981)

"The Matador" is a song written by Don Pfrimmer and Bob Morris, and recorded by American country music artist Sylvia. It was released in April 1981 as the fourth single from the album Drifter. The song reached #7 on the Billboard Hot Country Singles & Tracks chart.

== Chart performance ==
Chart (1981)	Peak position
US Hot Country Songs (Billboard)	7
Canadian RPM Country Tracks	8
