= Cry Just a Little Bit =

1983 single by Shakin' Stevens

Single by Shakin' Stevens

from the album The Bop Won't Stop
- B-side: "Love Me Tonight"
- Released: 4 November 1983
- Studio: Eden Studios, Chiswick
- Genre: Rock and roll
- Length: 3:09
- Label: Epic
- Songwriter: Bob Heatlie
- Producer: Christopher Neil

Shakin' Stevens singles chronology
"It's Late" (1983)	"Cry Just a Little Bit" (1983)	"A Rockin' Good Way" (1983)

"Cry Just a Little Bit" (also billed as "I Cry Just a Little Bit") is a song and a 1983 hit single for British singer Shakin' Stevens, from his studio album The Bop Won't Stop. It reached #3 in the UK charts and #67 on the Billboard Hot 100 in the United States, his only hit on the latter chart.

== Sylvia version ==
"Cry Just a Little Bit"

Single by Sylvia

from the album One Step Closer
- B-side: "Only the Shadows Know"
- Released: June 29, 1985
- Genre: Country
- Length: 2:56
- Label: RCA Nashville
- Songwriter: Bob Heatlie
- Producer: Brent Maher

Sylvia singles chronology
"Fallin' in Love" (1985)	"Cry Just a Little Bit" (1985)	"I Love You by Heart" (1985)

A cover single by American country music artist Sylvia was released in June 1985, and was the second single from the album One Step Closer. The song reached #9 on Billboard Hot Country Singles & Tracks chart.

== Chart performance ==
Shakin' Stevens

Chart (1983–1984)	Peak position
Australia (Kent Music Report)	31
Belgium (Ultratop 50 Flanders)	15
Canada Adult Contemporary (RPM)	30
Denmark (Hitlisten)	3
Germany (GfK)	27
Ireland (IRMA)	2
Netherlands (Dutch Top 40)	18
Netherlands (Single Top 100)	19
New Zealand (Recorded Music NZ)	41
Switzerland (Schweizer Hitparade)	19
UK Singles (Official Charts)	3
US Billboard Hot 100	67
US Adult Contemporary (Billboard)	13

Chart (2025)	Peak position
Poland (Polish Airplay Top 100)	53

Sylvia

Chart (1985)	Peak position
US Hot Country Songs (Billboard)	9
Canada Country Singles (RPM)	8

== Certifications ==
Region	Certification	Certified units/sales
United Kingdom (BPI)	Silver	250,000^{^}
^{^} Shipments figures based on certification alone.
