= Tumbleweed (song) =

Single by Sylvia

from the album Drifter
- B-side: "Anytime, Anyplace
- Released: September 6, 1980
- Genre: Country
- Length: 3:11
- Label: RCA Nashville
- Songwriters: Kye Fleming, Dennis Morgan
- Producer: Tom Collins

Sylvia singles chronology
| "It Don't Hurt to Dream" (1980) | "Tumbleweed" (1980) | "Drifter" (1981) |

"Tumbleweed" is a song written by Kye Fleming and Dennis Morgan, and recorded by American country music artist Sylvia. It was released in September 1980 as the second single from the album Drifter. The song reached #10 on the Billboard Hot Country Singles & Tracks chart.

== Chart performance ==
| Chart (1980) | Peak position |
|---|---|
| US Hot Country Songs (Billboard) | 10 |
