= Fallin' in Love (Sylvia song) =

"Fallin' In Love"

Single by Sylvia

from the album One Step Closer
- B-side: "True Blue"
- Released: January 1985
- Genre: Country
- Length: 2:55
- Label: RCA Nashville
- Songwriters: Randy Goodrum; Brent Maher
- Producer: Brent Maher

Sylvia singles chronology
"Love Over Old Times" (1984)	"Fallin' In Love" (1985)	"Cry Just a Little Bit" (1985)

"Fallin' In Love" is a song written by Randy Goodrum and Brent Maher, and recorded by American country music artist Sylvia. It was released in January 1985 as the first single from her album One Step Closer. The song reached #2 on the Billboard Hot Country Singles chart in May 1985 and #1 on the RPM Country Tracks chart in Canada.

== Chart performance ==
Chart (1985)	Peak position
US Hot Country Songs (Billboard)	2
Canadian RPM Country Tracks	1
