= Sylvia (singer) =

American singer and songwriter (born 1956)

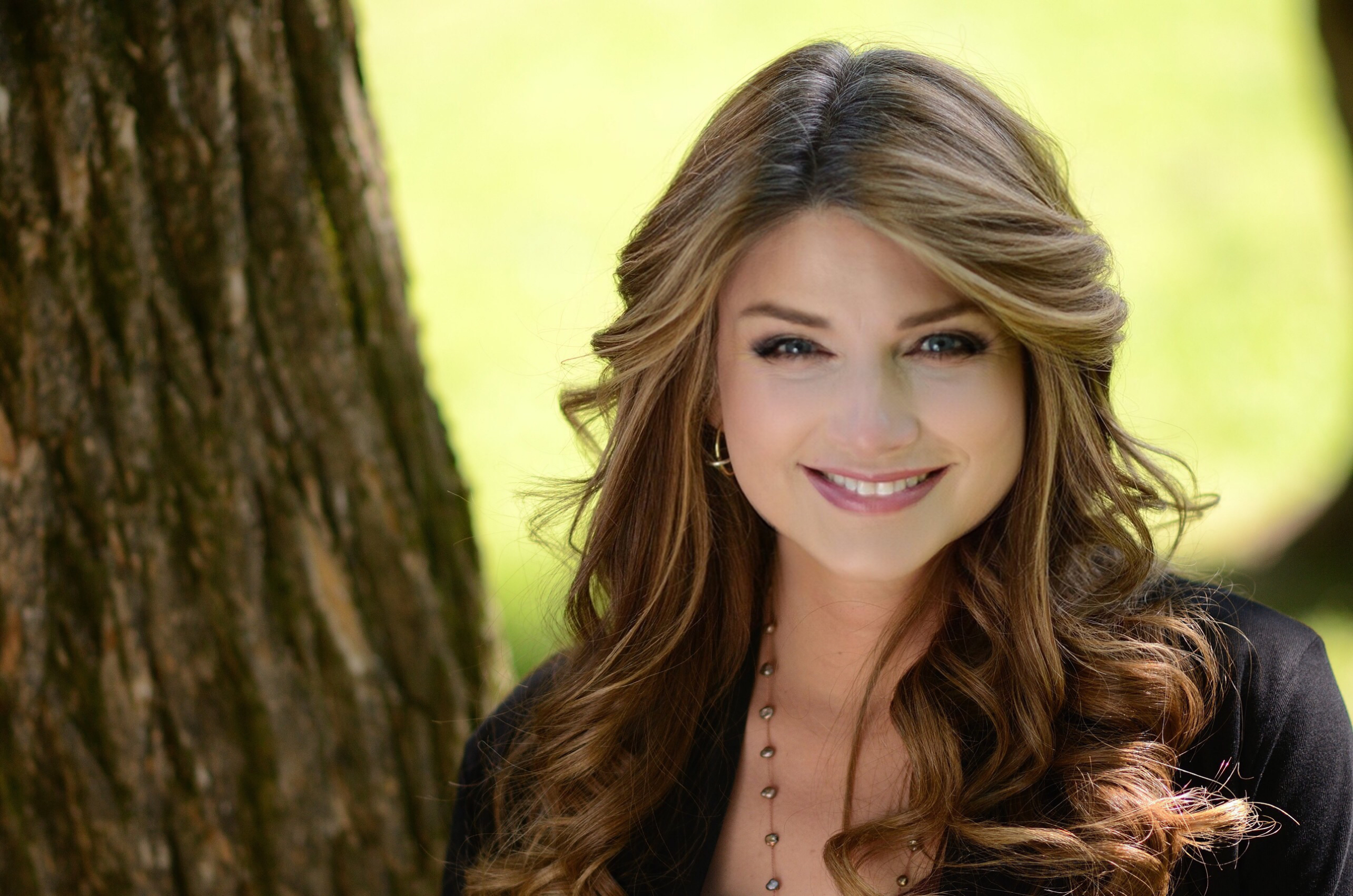
- Sylvia, circa 2020.
- Born: Sylvia Jane Kirby; December 9, 1956 (age 69); Kokomo, Indiana, US
- Occupations: Singer; songwriter; life coach
- Years active: 1979–present
- Works: Discography
- Spouse(s): 3; including Mike Allen (m. 1978; div. 1983) Tom Rutledge (m. 1984, divorced)
- Musical career
- Origin: Nashville, Tennessee, US
- Genres: Country; country pop
- Instruments: Vocals
- Labels: RCA; Red Pony
- Website: sylviamusic.com

Sylvia Jane Kirby (born December 9, 1956), known professionally as Sylvia, is an American singer, songwriter and life coach. In the 1980s decade, she had 11 US top ten country chart songs, including "Nobody" (1982), which crossed over onto the pop charts around the world.

She was signed to RCA Records in 1979 and began working with producer Tom Collins, who produced her 1981 debut album, Drifter. The LP spawned four top ten country songs, including the title track and "The Matador". Her second album, Just Sylvia (1982), sold nearly a million records in both the US and Canada, along with featuring "Nobody" and the top ten song, "Like Nothing Ever Happened". Although she did not have further crossover success, Snapshot (1983), spawned three more successful singles, including the title song, which was also Sylvia's second music video. Following the less-successful, Surprise (1984), Sylvia was produced by Brent Maher on 1985's One Step Closer. The album featured three top ten singles including a cover of "Cry Just a Little Bit".

After years of touring, Sylvia took a professional hiatus and explored songwriting with musician, John Mock. He would help craft her 1996 album, The Real Story, which was released on her own label titled Red Pony Records. She also became a life coach during this period and worked with clients to help them make personal and professional decisions. Sylvia then released two albums in 2002 on Red Pony: Where in the World (a collection of covers) and A Cradle in Bethlehem (a Christmas project). She returned in 2016 with an album inspired by her upbringing titled It's All in the Family, followed by two more studio albums since 2022. Sylvia also continues to tour and perform across North America.

== Early life ==
Sylvia Jane Kirby was born on December 9, 1956, in Kokomo, Indiana, United States. Her parents made automobile radios for the General Motors company while her grandfather operated a sawmill and grew tobacco. Although both her parents were not musically inclined, her mother often wrote poems and songs as a hobby. Her family spent time in Tennessee during her childhood where Kirby was routinely exposed to country music. As a young child she started singing in Kokomo's Pilgrim Holiness Church and routinely sang in front of her parents' bathroom mirror while listening to country music. Following high school graduation in November 1975, Kirby moved to Nashville, Tennessee, in pursuit of country music stardom.

Kirby's first Nashville job was working as a secretary at Pi-Gem Records under the supervision of record producer, Tom Collins. According to her website, Kirby stayed with Pi-Gem for four years, doing secretarial tasks and learning the music business. Kirby also had interest in recording with Collins. Collins believed she had potential if she made changes to her appearance and continued working on her vocals. Collins helped her become a demo singer and background vocalist for Janie Fricke and Barbara Mandrell. She also auditioned for the country group, Dave & Sugar, but did get into the group. Kirby's new connections and Collins's support helped her secure a recording contract, with Jerry Bradley signing her to RCA Records in 1979.

== Career ==
=== 1979–1984: Breakthrough and pop crossover ===
To distinguish her from RCA's Deborah Allen, Kirby (whose married name at the time was "Sylvia Allen") was billed only under first name, "Sylvia". Her first RCA single was released in 1979 called "You Don't Miss a Thing", a top 40 US country chart song that year. A second single, "It Don't Hurt to Dream" (1980), also made the US country top 40. Despite never performing before a live audience, the singles' chart appearances led to her serving as the opening act in Charley Pride's 1979 tour. Sylvia also learned performance techniques in the recording studio alongside Tom Collins, who was now serving has her producer. In late 1980, "Tumbleweed" was her first single to make the US country top ten. It was followed by Sylvia's first US number one single, "Drifter", which also climbed to number 13 on Canada's Country Tracks chart. Sylvia had two more US-Canadian top ten country hits in 1981: "The Matador" and "Heart on the Mend". All were featured on her 1981 debut album, also titled Drifter, which reached number ten on the US Country LP's chart. The album incorporated a western theme that was described as "airy" by critics while also being self-described by Sylvia as "prairie music". RCA then promoted the LP with appearances on Johnny Cash's television special, Hee Haw and The Mike Douglas Show.

Sylvia's sound moved further towards pop and country pop with her second album in 1982 titled Just Sylvia. Its lead single, "Sweet Yesterday", made the US and Canadian country top 15 while its second release, "Nobody", became a number one country song in both countries. The song (whose story centers on a wife who suspects her spouse is committing infidelity) was a crossover success on the pop charts, reaching number 15 on the US Hot 100, number five on the Canadian Top Singles chart and number two on New Zealand's Recorded Music chart. "Nobody" then received a gold certification from the Recording Industry Association of America, making Sylvia the only country artist to receive one in 1982. Its success also pushed Just Sylvia towards a gold certification as well. Sales of "Nobody" kept Just Sylvia on the US charts through 1983, eventually peaking at number two on the US country albums chart and number 56 on the US Billboard 200.

With "Nobody's" success, Sylvia started touring more than 250 dates annually, most of which were county and state fairs that attracted crowds as high as 7,000. She also made appearances on television shows like American Bandstand and Solid Gold. She also received nominations from the Grammy Awards and Academy of Country Music Awards. "Nobody" was followed in late 1982 by "Like Nothing Ever Happened", which made the US country top five and became her second Canadian country chart topper.

Sylvia's third album, Snapshot, was released by RCA in May 1983 and a similar musical style that included more uptempo selections. Critics compared the album's sound and material to that of Just Sylvia while also highlighting its use of crossover production styles. Snapshot became Sylvia's third top ten album on the US country chart and third to make the US Billboard 200. Its title tune was the LP's lead single and became another US-Canadian country top five hit. The single also featured a music video, which was considered one of country music's first "modern video clips". The LP also spawned the US top 20 song, "The Boy Gets Around", and another US-Canadian top five song titled "I Never Quite Got Back (From Loving You)". Sylvia also won the Top Female Vocalist accolade from the Academy of Country Music Awards in 1983. With a new hairstyle on the front cover came the release of her 1984 album, Surprise. It received less favorable critical reception for moving further away from country while other critics favored the depth of its song choices. The album itself was less commercially successful, only reaching number 40 on the US country chart, while both of its singles only made the US country top 40.

=== 1985–1989: Continued success and stepping back ===
Sylvia took a new musical direction after becoming frustrated by the country pop and upbeat material she was recording. Instead, she sought out producer, Brent Maher (known for his work with The Judds), and recorded material that had traditional country music elements. The resulting album was Sylvia's fifth for RCA titled One Step Closer. It was also her fifth to make the US country albums chart and peaked at number 19 in 1985. Its lead single, "Fallin' In Love", rose to number two on the US country songs chart and became her third chart-topping Canadian country song. It was followed by her cover of Shakin' Stevens's "Cry Just a Little Bit" that became a US-Canadian country top ten hit. She helped bring 1970s pop artist, Michael Johnson, to the attention of country audiences with their duet of "I Love You by Heart" (his first country album was released in response to their duet). Their collaborative recording reached the US and Canadian country top ten in 1985.

In 1986, Sylvia collaborated with Maher on what was set to be her next studio album titled, Knockin' Around. However, the project went unreleased by RCA, while its intended lead single was still issued called "Nothin' Ventured Nothin' Gained". The song made the US country top 40 in 1986 while Knockin' Around remained shelved until 2024 when the 11-track collection was ultimately released by RCA and Legacy Recordings. A compilation album of Sylvia's Greatest Hits was released by RCA in 1987 that featured two new recordings ("Never My Love" and "Straight from My Heart") along with seven of her hits. Of its new cuts, "Straight from the Heart", was issued as a single, which Billboard named it one of its "recommended" picks. The song only reached number 63 on the US country chart and Sylvia left RCA Records in late 1987.

In the late 1980s, Sylvia decided to stop touring and recording after years of constant work. Despite this, she remained visible in the media by appearing regularly on television, including a special held in Las Vegas called "Country Top 20" in 1989. Between 1988 and 1989, she hosted her own television cooking program on The Nashville Network (TNN) titled Holiday Gourmet, a 30-minute show that featured country artists on each episode including Roy Clark, Mel Tillis and Dottie West. She also was a consistent guest-host of another TNN program between 1988 and 1989 titled Crook & Chase.

=== 1990–present: Hiatus, musical transition, and life coaching ===
Sylvia felt professionally stuck following her split with RCA, telling HuffPost, "It was a scary time. I had likened it to feeling like you're floating around in outer space untethered." In the early 1990s, she explored songwriting and collaborated with Nashville music composers like Craig Bickhardt, Verlon Thompson and Kent Robbins. John Mock also assisted her with production and arrangement, being a collaborator of hers ever since then. Now under the name "Sylvia Hutton", she began performing her self-penned songs and tried to get a Nashville recording contract, but was unsuccessful in doing so. As a result, Sylvia formed her own independent label titled Red Pony Records and issued her next album in 1996 titled The Real Story. The project featured 13 songs (seven of which were self-composed) taken from moments of her own life. Sylvia released her next Red Pony studio album in 2002 titled Where in the World, a collection of acoustic covers including "Bird on a Wire" by Leonard Cohen and "Marcie" by Joni Mitchell. The same year, she issued an album of Christmas music titled A Cradle in Bethlehem featuring covers of songs like "O Holy Night", "What Child Is This?" and "My Grown Up Christmas List".

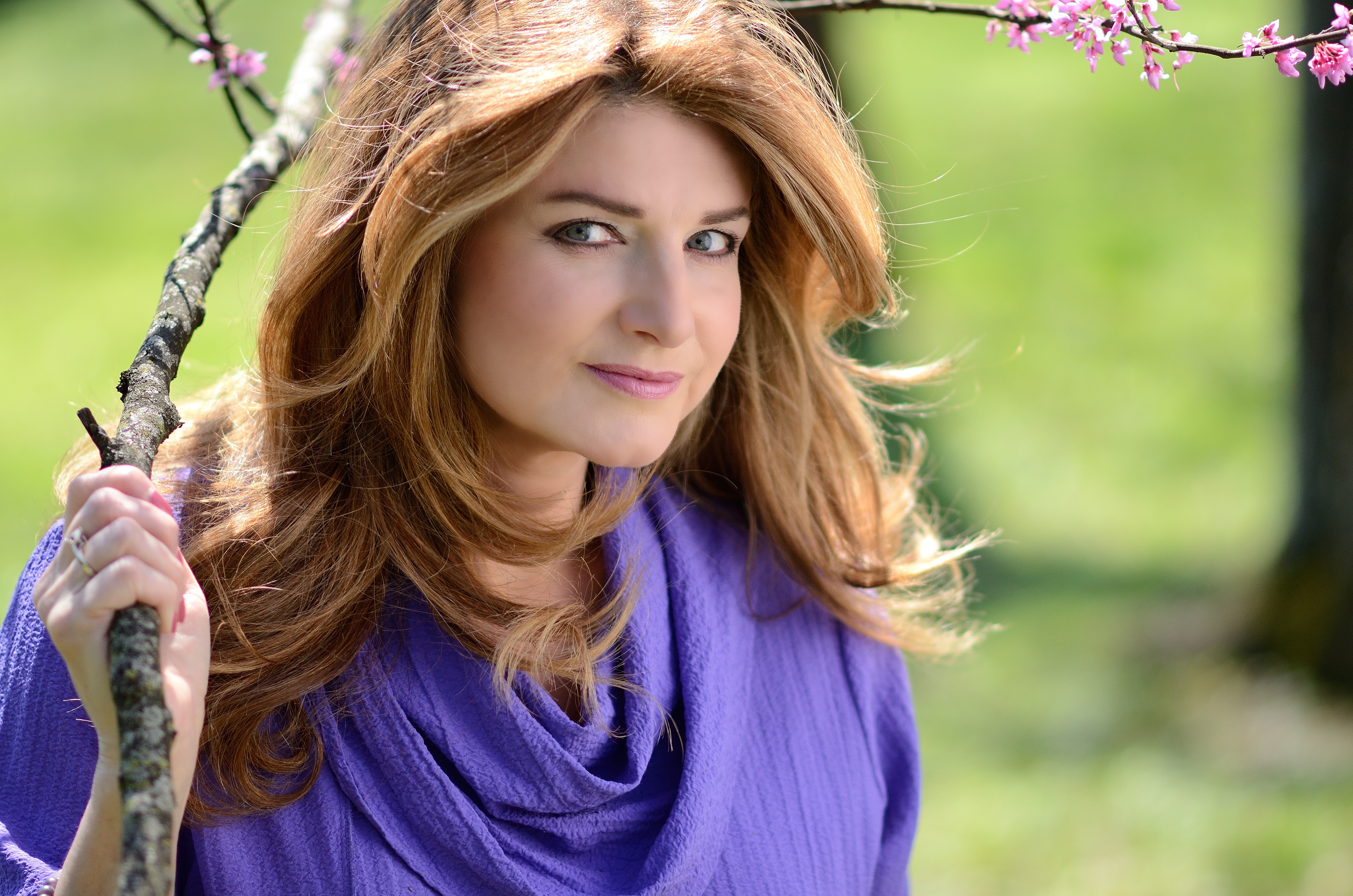
A headshot of Sylvia, circa 2020.

Although Sylvia had released three albums on her own label, it was challenging for her recordings to gain a wider audience. Inspired by a passion for psychology she took a new direction and became a life and career coach, graduating in 2002 from the Hudson Institute in Santa Barbara, California. According to her coaching website, Sylvia focuses on "developing human potential – helping people grow into their highest potential to live a more fulfilling and intentional life." She also explained that coaching is about non-judgmentally guiding people through their personal or professional transitions while also being present in the current moment.

Sylvia then took a 14-year hiatus from recording new music. In 2016, she released her first album in 14 years titled It's All in the Family, featuring material co-written by Sylvia, Bickhart, Kate Campbell and Thom Schuyler. The project's 12 song-collection focused on themes of family and overcoming obstacles. The album received critical acclaim for its song choices and Sylvia's vocal delivery. She followed it in 2018 with, Second Bloom: The Hits Re-Imagined, an album of her re-recorded 1980s hits reworked to fit contemporary styles. It received critical acclaim for keeping the foundations of the songs the same while also modernizing their musical style. In 2022, she issued Nature Child: A Dreamer's Journey, a project of children's music. The album was inspired by the amount of child fans Sylvia had during her commercial years and was also dedicated to the "inner child" child within herself.

== Artistry ==
Sylvia's 1980s music was rooted in the country genre, but also embedded country pop, disco and adult contemporary. AllMusic's Stephen Thomas Erlewine wrote, "At a time when country music already trending toward light, sweet pop music, Sylvia's records were the aural equivalent of cotton candy, so light they nearly floated in the air." Kurt Wolff, author of Country Music: The Rough Guide, believed that her "youthful vigor and bouncy, chirpy style foreshadowed the late-80's success of adolescent pop singers like Debbie Gibson and Tiffany." Wolff also found songs like "Tumbleweed" blended country with disco. Rolling Stone's Stephen L. Betts noted a similar finding with Sylvia's "The Matador", describing it as having a "throbbing disco beat". Betts further wrote, "For a brief, shining moment, Sylvia was Olivia Newton-John and ABBA rolled up into one."

Sylvia credited Patsy Cline as her primary musical inspiration, later saying, "I used to listen to Patsy Cline so much that I felt like I knew her. I wish I really had."

Sylvia regularly attends vocal lessons to maintain her singing voice, crediting her vocal coach, Gerald Arthur, in a 2022 interview. From his vocal lessons, she learned about control and identifying with song lyrics to help bring out stronger lyrical messages.

== Personal life ==
Sylvia has been married and divorced three times. Her first marriage was in 1978 to photographer, Mike Allen, which ended in divorce in 1983. In a 1983 interview, Sylvia explained that the couple "married young and grew apart", yet remained on friendly terms. In 1984, she married musician Tom Rutledge. In 1990, she married for a third time and changed her last name to "Hutton". Her third husband's first name has not been publicly revealed. However, she told The Huffington Post that her marriage had ended in 2014.

== Discography ==
Studio albums

- Drifter (1981)
- Just Sylvia (1982)
- Snapshot (1983)
- Surprise (1984)
- One Step Closer (1985)
- The Real Story (1996)
- Where in the World (2002)
- A Cradle in Bethlehem (2002)
- It's All in the Family (2016)
- Second Bloom: The Hits Re-Imagined (re-recordings) (2018)
- Nature Child: A Dreamer's Journey (2022)
- Knockin' Around: The Lost Album (2024)

== Awards and nominations ==
Year	Nominee / work	Award	Result	Ref.
1979	15th Academy of Country Music Awards	Top New Female Vocalist	Nominated	
1980	Cashbox	Top New Female Vocalist – Singles	Nominated	
1981	17th Academy of Country Music Awards	Top Female Vocalist	Nominated	
1981	Billboard	Top Female Artist	Nominated	
1982	18th Academy of Country Music Awards	Single Record of the Year –"Nobody"	Nominated	
1982	18th Academy of Country Music Awards	Song of the Year – "Nobody"	Nominated	
1982	18th Academy of Country Music Awards	Top Female Vocalist	Won	
1982	Billboard	Top Female Artist – Singles	Nominated	
1983	10th American Music Awards	Favorite Country Female Artist	Nominated	
1983	25th Annual Grammy Awards	Best Country Vocal Performance, Female – "Nobody"	Nominated	
1983	19th Academy of Country Music Awards	Top Female Vocalist	Nominated	
1983	Billboard	Top Female Album Artist	Won	
1983	Billboard	Top Singles Female Artist	Nominated	
1983	Cashbox	Top Female Vocalist – Albums	Won	
1983	Cashbox	Top Female Vocalist – Singles	Nominated	
1984	11th American Music Awards	Favorite Country Female Artist	Nominated	
1985	Cashbox	Top Female Vocalist – Singles	Nominated	
1986	Billboard	Overall Top Duos (with Michael Johnson)	Nominated	
