= Drifter (song) =

Single by Sylvia

from the album Drifter
- B-side: "Missin' You"
- Released: January 1981
- Genre: Country
- Length: 2:25
- Label: RCA Nashville
- Songwriter(s): Don Pfrimmer; Archie Jordan
- Producer(s): Tom Collins

Sylvia singles chronology
"Tumbleweed" (1980)	"Drifter" (1981)	"The Matador" (1981)

"Drifter" is a song written by Don Pfrimmer and Archie Jordan, and recorded by American country music artist Sylvia. It was released in January 1981 as the third single and title track from the album Drifter. The song was Sylvia's fourth country hit and the first of two number one songs on the country chart. The single went to number one for one week and spent eleven weeks on the country chart.

== Content ==
The song focuses on a woman left with feelings for a drifting cowboy.

== Charts ==
Chart (1981)	Peak position
US Hot Country Songs (Billboard)	1
Canadian RPM Country Tracks	13
