= Nobody (Sylvia song) =

Single by Sylvia

from the album Just Sylvia
- B-side: "I'll Make It Right with You"
- Released: June 1982
- Studio: Woodland Sound Studios
- Genre: Country pop
- Length: 3:19
- Label: RCA
- Songwriters: Kye Fleming; Dennis Morgan
- Producer: Tom Collins

Sylvia singles chronology
"Sweet Yesterday" (1982)	"Nobody" (1982)	"Like Nothing Ever Happened" (1982)

"Nobody" is a song originally recorded by American singer Sylvia. Written by Kye Fleming and Dennis Morgan, the song was recorded at the last minute in a session in the belief it would be successful for Sylvia. It consisted of a country pop production and was produced by Tom Collins. It was released as a single in 1982, becoming a number one recording on the US-Canadian country charts, along with crossing over onto the pop charts in several countries. It later certified gold in sales from the Recording Industry Association of America.

== Background ==
Sylvia had a series of US country top ten hits during the early 1980s that made inroads to country pop. During 1980-81, she had four top ten songs, including the chart-topping "Drifter", which all had country pop origins, along with western and cowboy themes. For her second album, Just Sylvia, she and producer Tom Collins, moved further closer into country pop by incorporating electronic instrumentation such as synthesizers. The new style was shown on her first 1982 single, "Sweet Yesterday". In an interview with Duke FM, Sylvia explained that she had cut enough songs to complete an album when songwriters, Kye Fleming and Dennis Morgan, walked into her recording studio to play "Nobody". Fleming and Morgan had not yet put the song on tape but believed it to be a quality song for Sylvia to hear before she went into her session that day.

== Content, recording and composition ==
The story line of "Nobody" centers on a woman who becomes suspicious that her spouse is cheating on her with another woman. Additionally, the main character asks whom her spouse was talking to and he replies by saying, "Nobody". After agreeing to cut the song in the remaining minutes of their session, both Sylvia and Collins believed "Nobody" was a special track. The song was subsequently recorded at Woodland Sound Studios in Nashville, Tennessee and was produced entirely by Tom Collins. According to the sheet music published at Musicnotes.com, "Nobody" is set in a time signature of common time and is set in C Major, with Sylvia's voice going between tonal notes of G4-G5.

== Release and chart performance ==
"Nobody" was released as a single by RCA Records in June 1982 as a seven-inch vinyl record. It featured a B-side titled "I'll Make It Right with You". That year, it became Sylvia's second (and final) number one single on the US Billboard Hot Country Songs chart, spending 26 weeks on the chart altogether. According to Sylvia, RCA promotion executive, Carson Traver, believed the song could become a crossover pop hit if the label kept promoting the single. From Traver's and RCA's promotion, the song received airplay on a major Los Angeles pop radio station, which helped bring to a mainstream audience. On August 21, 1982 (the week the song dropped from the top of the US country chart), the song made its debut on the US Hot 100, eventually reaching the number 15 position. It was Sylvia's only single to make the Hot 100 in her career. "Nobody" was became one of two singles in her career to make the US Billboard adult contemporary chart, rising to the number five position. In Canada, "Nobody" rose to the number five position on the RPM Top Singles chart, number five on their corresponding Adult Contemporary Tracks chart and became her second number one on their Country Tracks chart. It also reached the number two position on New Zealand's Recorded Music chart and number 41 on Australia Kent Music Report chart.

== Track listing ==
7" vinyl single (US, UK, Australia, New Zealand, Germany, Ireland, Japan)

- "Nobody" – 3:19
- "I'll Make It Right with You" – 3:30

== Charts ==
=== Weekly charts ===
Weekly chart performance for "Nobody"
Chart (1982–1983)	Peak position
Australia (Kent Music Report)	41
Canada Adult Contemporary Tracks (RPM)	5
Canada Top Singles (RPM)	5
Canada Country Tracks (RPM)	1
New Zealand (Recorded Music NZ)	2
US Billboard Hot 100 (Billboard)	15
US Hot Adult Contemporary Tracks (Billboard)	5
US Hot Country Songs (Billboard)	1
US Top 100 (Cash Box)	9

=== Year-end charts ===
Year-end chart performance for "Nobody"
Chart (1982–1983)	Rank
Canada Top Singles (RPM)	59
US Hot Country Songs (Billboard)	2
US Top 100 (Cashbox)	56

== Certifications ==
Region	Certification	Certified units/sales
United States (RIAA)	Gold	1,000,000^{^}
^{^} Shipments figures based on certification alone.
