= Kye Fleming =

American singer-songwriter (born 1951)

- Born: Rhonda Kye Fleming; October 9, 1951 (age 75); Pensacola, Florida, United States
- Origin: Nashville, Tennessee, United States
- Genre: Country
- Occupations: Singer-songwriter, composer
- Instrument: Guitar
- Years active: 1970s–present

Rhonda Kye Fleming (born October 9, 1951) is an American singer/songwriter and music publisher in Nashville, Tennessee. She is best known for writing a series of hit songs in the 1980s, making productive collaborations with artists Ronnie Milsap and Barbara Mandrell. Fleming was inducted into the Nashville Songwriters Hall of Fame in 2009 and has won more than 42 BMI Awards, including BMI Songwriter of the Year for 3 consecutive years (1981–83). Fifteen of her compositions have achieved a benchmark of one million performances each. Some of Fleming's most successful songs include: "I Was Country When Country Wasn't Cool", "Sleeping Single in a Double Bed", "Smoky Mountain Rain", "Years", "I Wouldn't Have Missed It for the World", "Nobody"," and "Give Me Wings". In 2012, she was an honoree of the Country Music Hall of Fame and Museum's Poets and Prophets series which honors songwriters deemed to have made a significant contribution to country music. The series featured an extended interview with Fleming before an audience at the Country Music Hall of Fame, and film clips, recordings, and photos of Fleming's life work and awards.

== Early life ==
Though Fleming was born in Pensacola, Florida, she only lived there for two weeks. Her father was in the Navy and the family had to move often. At various times she lived in Hawaii, California, Texas, and Arkansas, but most years were spent in Fort Smith, Arkansas, which her family considers home. Fleming was exposed to music through uncles who played in country bands. She took up guitar in the ninth grade and immediately began writing songs – which she thought was easier than trying to learn somebody else's. Fleming knew then that she wanted to have a career in music. Joni Mitchell was her biggest influence. "There's not a better lyricist", said Fleming. She attended the University of Arkansas with a vocal scholarship, and performed as a solo act in coffeehouses and bars during that time. In 1974, at the same time that Elvis Presley was playing a show in Tulsa, Oklahoma, Fleming was singing in a hotel lounge in Tulsa, which happened to be the same hotel where Presley's band was staying. Presley players Jerry Scheff, Ronnie Tutt, and Glen Hardin heard her perform and were impressed with her songs. Scheff told her that if she came to California, he could introduce her to some music publishers. She took the offer, packed her Ford Econoline van and headed west. The first publisher who spoke with her signed her. One of Fleming's songs, "Falling, Falling, Gone" was recorded by The Williams Brothers and was performed by them on a broadcast of The Sonny & Cher Comedy Hour. However, after about nine months, she felt she "wasn't sure", and returned to Arkansas. There, she again pursued a career as a solo artist. A successful audition at The Bitter End night club in New York's Greenwich Village got Fleming bookings at coffee houses across the country. At this time she said she didn't care if she was categorized as an artist or a songwriter. Along the way she dropped her first name, "Rhonda" to avoid confusion with actress Rhonda Fleming. At age 26, she had a period of fatigue or frustration in the pursuit of a career and decided to take a little break and spend a couple of weeks back home in Arkansas. Within an hour of making that decision, her old friend (Jerry Scheff) just happened to call and said he was going to Nashville and had a meeting with a couple of publishers. He invited her to come to Nashville first before she went back home.

== Success ==
In Nashville in 1977, she met with producer/publisher Tom Collins at Pi-Gem Music, a meeting she described as "life-changing". She played some songs for him and said "tell me what you want and I can write it". He signed her as a staff writer and she was paired with songwriter Dennis Morgan who was an excellent guitarist and had more of a pop background. This duo set up a daily schedule to write beginning at 10 AM each weekday. She has called Dennis Morgan the "perfect creative partner". They averaged about one finished song per week. The Fleming/Morgan duo then created one hit song after another for about 6 years. Fleming was in touch with Tom Collins almost daily and could create a song targeted by him directly to one of his clients, including Ronnie Milsap, Barbara Mandrell, Sylvia, and others. Fleming said, "If he's cut a couple of songs on somebody and all of a sudden he says we need a song that's 'more country' than this, or 'more pop' or whatever to fill out an album then he can tell us." This arrangement not only benefitted Collins, but also the authors because it gave them a much greater chance that their songs would be recorded by established artists. At one point, Collins requested a song something like "Appalachian Rain" about the area of North Carolina where Ronnie Milsap was born. Fleming and Morgan came up with the song "Smoky Mountain Rain" which became a huge hit for Milsap. Fleming said it was "a matter of just talking about it—what it feels like in the Smokies". The song went to number one on both the country charts and Billboard's Adult Contemporary charts. Rolling Stone named it as of the "100 Greatest Country Songs of All Time". The song was designated the current "Tennessee State Song" in 2010 by the state legislature. She enjoyed working with Tom Collins' staff and developed a friendship with Collins' receptionist, Sylvia Jane Kirby (Allen), who had aspirations of becoming a recording artist herself. Collins finally acquiesced to her wish. Fleming and Morgan wrote two songs for the former receptionist who had decided to go only by her first name, Sylvia. These were "Tumbleweed" and "Nobody". The former was a top 10 hit, and latter reached #1 on the country charts and was a crossover hit, reaching #15 on the pop charts. The song "Nobody" was nominated for a Grammy and won BMI's 1982 Song of the Year for receiving more radio air play than any other song.

== Branching out ==
Her reputation now established, Fleming moved on to writing other types of music including pop, R&B, and contemporary Christian. She co-wrote with successful singer/songwriter Janis Ian, including the hits "What About the Love" (Amy Grant) and "Some People's Lives" (Bette Midler). She co-wrote with Nashville Songwriters Hall of Famer Don Schlitz, creating the number one hit "Give Me Wings" (Michael Johnson). She also wrote material for prime-time television shows Murder She Wrote, Barbara Mandrell and the Mandrell Sisters, and Sonny & Cher. Later, Fleming became a music publisher and a mentor. She said, "I really love working with writers and artists whose dreams are on fire, but before they've had anything happen." An example would be her mentoring of the Arkansas group "Edens Edge" who impressed her when she was judging a song contest for the Nashville Songwriters Association International (NSAI). She formed KyeCatt Music, partnering with fellow songwriter Catt Gravitt. A major portion of the publishing rights to the Kye Fleming Song Catalog has been acquired by Hearts Bluff Music.

== Awards and honors ==
- Academy of Country Music Poet's Award (2019)
- Nashville Songwriters Hall of Fame (2009)
- BMI Songwriter of the Year x 3 years (1981–83)
- NSAI Songwriter of the Year x 2 years (1981–82)
- over 42 BMI Awards in her career
- multiple CMA, ACM, DOVE and GRAMMY nominations
- BMI Pop Songwriter of the Year x 2 years
- CMA Triple Play Award (for 3 chart-topping hits in a 12-month period)
- BMI Country Song of the Year, (1983), "Nobody"
- 10 Million-Air Award (10 million broadcast performances)
- author Tennessee State Song (2010) "Smoky Mountain Rain"
