= Dennis Morgan (songwriter) =

American songwriter and music publisher (born 1952)

Dennis Morgan (born July 30, 1952, in Tracy, Minnesota) is an American songwriter and music publisher, best known for writing songs for Aretha Franklin, Faith Hill, Barbara Mandrell, and Eric Clapton. He has also published hit songs by Garth Brooks, All-4-One, Feargal Sharkey, and Trisha Yearwood.

Morgan's career as a songwriter started as a session musician in Nashville. His first songwriting success was "Sleeping Single in a Double Bed", a number one hit for Barbara Mandrell in 1978. As a result, he and cowriter Kye Fleming were nominated for a Grammy. His partnership with Fleming also yielded more hits for Mandrell ("I Was Country When Country Wasn't Cool"), fellow country artists Sylvia ("Nobody"), Ronnie Milsap ("Smoky Mountain Rain"), and Steve Wariner ("All Roads Lead To You").

Songs by Morgan and cowriter Simon Climie have been hits for pop artists including Climie Fisher ("Love Changes Everything") and Aretha Franklin & George Michael ("I Knew You Were Waiting (For Me)").

Morgan was inducted into the Nashville Songwriters Foundation's Songwriters Hall of Fame in 2004.

His works are self-administered in North America by his company Little Shop of Morgansongs and via Warner Chappell Music internationally. He is a BMI member and according to BMI repertoire, 33 of over 2000 songs written by him are BMI awarded for extensive radio playback.

== See also ==
- Songs written by Dennis Morgan (songwriter)
