= Tom Collins (music producer) =

American music producer and publisher (born 1942)

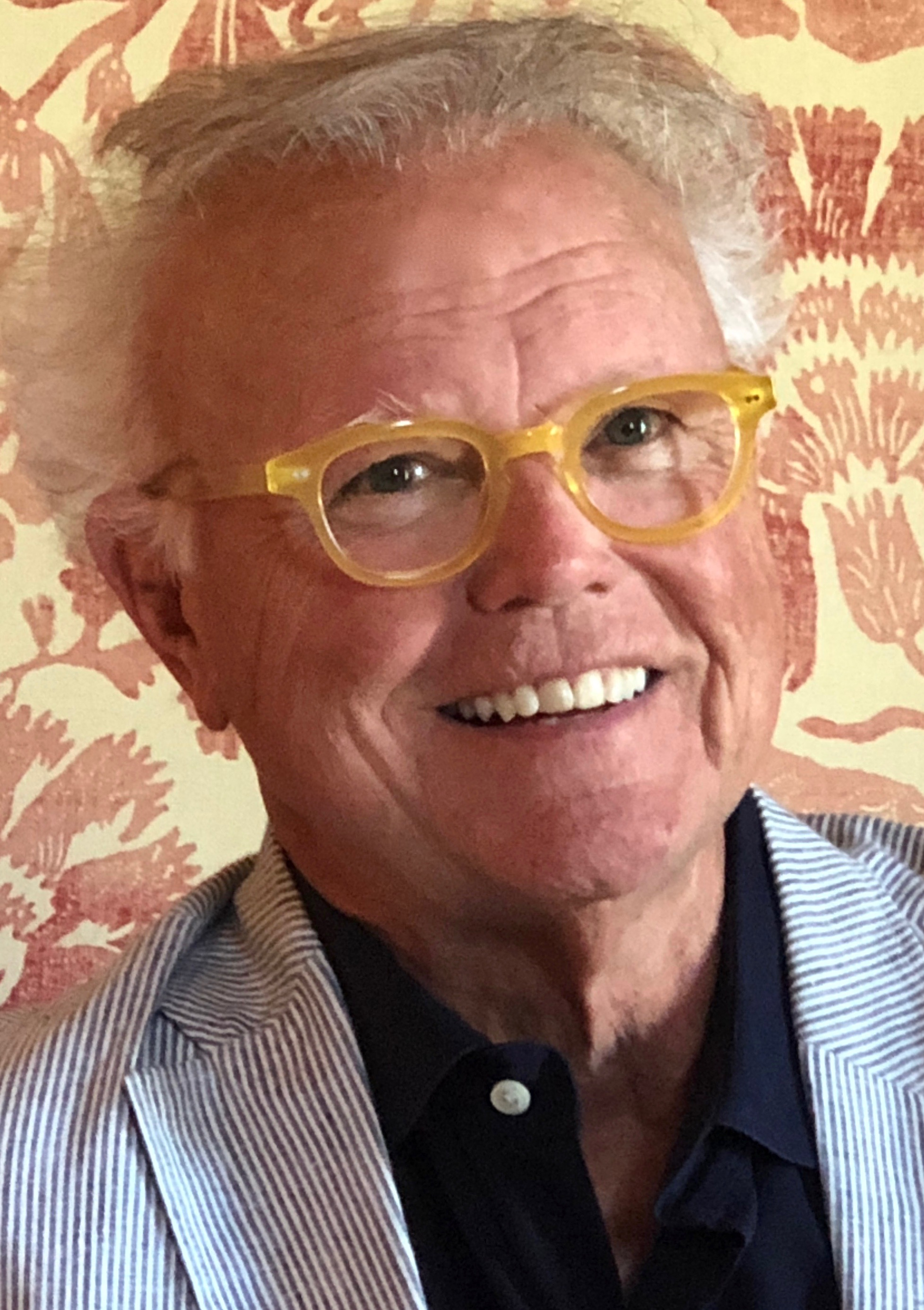
- Tom Collins in June 2018

Background information
- Born: Bernie Tom Collins; May 30, 1942 (age 84); Lenoir City, Tennessee, US
- Genres: Country, countrypolitan
- Occupations: Music producer, publisher
- Years active: 1970s–2000s

Bernie Tom Collins (born May 30, 1942) is an American music producer and publisher in Nashville, Tennessee who has received three CMA Awards as Producer of the Year, and seven Grammy nominations. He produced a steady stream of country music hits over a 30-year span from artists including Ronnie Milsap, Barbara Mandrell, Sylvia, Tom T. Hall, Jim Ed Brown, James Galway, Marie Osmond, and Steve Wariner. Collins served as chairman of the Board of the CMA in 1979 and 1980.

In 1982 alone, Collins produced four number one country hits: "Nobody" (Sylvia); "I Wouldn't Have Missed It for the World" and "Any Day Now" (Ronnie Milsap); and "'Till You're Gone" (Barbara Mandrell). His publishing Company, Tom Collins Music, received BMI's Robert J. Burton Award in 1983 for "Most Performed Song of the Year", "Nobody", by Sylvia. During the period from 1970 to 1990, Collins' catalog holdings grew to make him one of Nashville's most successful independent producers.

== Early life ==
Collins was born and raised in Lenoir City, Tennessee, which lies along the Tennessee River southwest of Knoxville and is part of the Knoxville Metropolitan Area. He attended the University of Tennessee in Knoxville and took scientific courses with the idea of attending dental school, but was always interested in music. He played trumpet in the University of Tennessee band and was a member of the Sigma Chi fraternity. He directed the fraternity's chorus in annual singing competitions. He was honored as a "Significant Sig" in 1983, a national honor given by the fraternity to notable members.

Though Collins received a Bachelor of Science degree, he was drawn to pursue a career in the business side of music. Collins moved to Nashville in 1970 and was hired at Pi-Gem Music by Jack D. Johnson. Johnson was a Nashville talent manager who, in 1964, discovered and signed singer Charley Pride, then an ex-baseball player. Pride achieved enormous success in country music, received a star in the Hollywood Walk of Fame in 1999, and was inducted into the Country Music Hall of Fame in 2000. Collins learned from Johnson how to handle the career of a major star.

== Ronnie Milsap ==
While attending a rock music club called the "Whisky a Go Go" in 1972, Charley Pride heard a performance by Ronnie Milsap, a R&B-minded singer who impressed him. Pride spoke to Milsap, suggesting that a change of genre might help his career, and that he would make a good country singer. At that time, Milsap was living in Memphis, Tennessee and had been performing for about three years at a nightclub called "T.J.'s". He had already landed two or three record deals, but had enjoyed little success and was frustrated about a lack of progress in his career. Tom Collins heard Milsap perform in Memphis and offered a proposal, entailing Milsap moving to Nashville, embracing country music, signing with a new label, and the potential of booking a Nashville venue for live performances. Collins would produce the recordings, Jerry Bradley would sign him to the RCA record label, and Jack Johnson would be his manager. To do so, Milsap had to buy his way out of an existing management contract. Milsap stated, "I lost my house, everything I had worked for, and was $20,000 in debt. I came to Nashville broke, busted and in high spirits that I could make something of myself".

In 1973, after Milsap's acceptance of the offer, Collins produced a single consisting of "(All together Now) Let's Fall Apart" on the A-side, and "I Hate You" on the B-side. These songs were released on an album called "Where My Heart Is" – Milsap's first album to chart, reaching #5 on the Billboard country charts. In 1975, Collins and Johnson won CMA's Producer of the year award for their collaboration on this recording. From this point, Collins became the sole producer of scores of Milsap's hits, a relationship which lasted many years. Of Collins, Milsap said, "He knows me. He knows when to push and when to lay back". Collins, partnering with Charley Pride, bought Pi-Gem song publishing. Pi-Gem Music was sold to Welk Music Group in 1981, after which Collins formed his own company, "Tom Collins Music, Inc.". Some of the top songwriters at Pi-Gem went with Collins in his new endeavor, notably Grammy-nominated writers Kye Fleming and Dennis Morgan.

It was an advantage for Collins to have the Fleming/Morgan writers working with him on a daily basis. Fleming stated, "If he's cut a couple of songs on somebody and all of a sudden he says we need a song that's 'more country' than this, or 'more pop' or whatever to fill out an album, then he can tell us." Not only could Collins custom tailor the songs to each artist, but the writers benefited because their creations were then much more likely to be recorded by established artists. In the summer of 1980, Collins told his writers he wanted a new song for Ronnie Milsap that featured the region of western North Carolina where Milsap was born and raised. He suggested "Appalachian Rain" as a possible title. Fleming and Morgan decided to let the geographical spot be an image that would stimulate the imagination of the listener, without a lot of detail, reminiscent of Jimmy Webb's song "Wichita Lineman".

The song ultimately produced was "Smoky Mountain Rain" – one of Milsap's signature songs and a number one hit on both the country charts and the Billboard Adult Contemporary charts. Rolling Stone listed it as one of the "100 Greatest Country Songs of all Time". "Smoky Mountain Rain" was chosen by the Tennessee State Legislature in 2010 as the eighth official state song. This was only one of Milsap's 40 number one hits produced by Tom Collins, which also include: "What a Difference You've Made in My Life", "Daydreams About Night Things", "Lost in the Fifties Tonight (In the Still of the Night)", "I Wouldn't Have Missed It for the World", "She Keeps the Home Fires Burning", "It Was Almost Like a Song", "Stranger in My House", "Pure Love", and "(There's) No Gettin' Over Me".

== Barbara Mandrell ==
In the mid-1970s, future Hall of Famer Barbara Mandrell had had some successful songs but wanted something more. She became a client of Collins, changed labels, and things began to improve. In 1975, Collins produced her first top five record with the single "Standing Room Only". Collins steered her to a more commercial "pop" sound, sometimes referred to as "countrypolitan". Collins stated, "we created our own sound and style with Barbara Mandrell ... she is country ... but she is selling in almost every market existing, having hit Billboard's Soul, Country, Pop, and Easy Listening charts.". Collins also said that country music tends run in cycles between more traditional sound and more pop and that "you need to stay just a half-step ahead of the trend".

Mandrell's first number one hit was "Sleeping Single in a Double Bed", written by Kye Fleming and Dennis Morgan and produced by Collins in 1978. The same writing duo, with Collins as producer, followed with two additional number one country charts hits in 1980 and 1981: "Years" and "I Was Country When Country Wasn't Cool". Collins produced 19 albums for Mandrell.

== Sylvia ==
In January 1976, Collins hired Sylvia Jane Hutton (née Kirby) as his receptionist, then in her 20s. Prior to moving to Nashville from Kokomo, Indiana, she aspired to be a singer and practiced singing into a deodorant bottle "microphone" in front of a mirror. She repeatedly asked Collins if she could make a record for him. She was 35 pounds overweight at 5' 5", wore no makeup, and had a history of surviving on a diet of Krispy Kreme doughnuts and cornflakes.

Collins was initially unimpressed with her singing, but decided to give her a chance if she would agree to lose some weight. He let her sing on some demo sessions and began to see developing potential, saying, "She knew what she was going to have to give to be a success". He helped her secure a recording contract with RCA. Kirby chose to appear professionally only by her first name, Sylvia, and recorded her first album, Drifter, in 1981. The title song went to number one.

Three other songs from "Drifter" reached the top 10: "The Matador" (#7), "Heart on the Mend" (#8) and "Tumbleweed" (#10). Her second album, Just Sylvia, featured the song "Nobody" which rose to number one on the country charts and was a crossover hit which reached #15 on the Billboard Hot 100. It also won her a Grammy nomination for Best Female Country Vocal Performance, and was awarded BMI's Song of the Year for receiving more radio air play than any other song that year. She was named Female Vocalist of the Year for 1982 by the Academy of Country Music.

== Later years ==
Collins acquired the song catalog of Tom T. Hall in 1991. In 1999 he sold Tom Collins Music, Hallnote Music, and Collins Court Music to Acuff-Rose Publications. As of 2015, all songs under the umbrella of these catalogs belong to Sony/ATV Music Publishing. Collins retired from the music business, and, as of 2015, was pursuing several hobbies including tennis and collecting art.
