= 1982 in country music =

This is a list of notable events in country music that took place in the year 1982.

== Events ==
- September 24- Zeke Clements celebrates his 50th Grand Ole Opry anniversary
- October 30 — Hank Williams, Jr. has nine albums simultaneously on the Billboard Top Country Albums chart.
- December 8 — The death of Marty Robbins at age 57 stuns the country music world and leaves a huge void among fans. He is inducted into the Country Music Hall of Fame just weeks earlier.

=== No dates ===
- Drake-Chenault syndicates The History of Country Music, a 52-hour country music version of the radio syndicator's successful The History of Rock and Roll (which had three editions issued, the last in 1981). Produced in 1981 and early 1982 before syndicating to radio stations, the radio documentary was hosted by Ralph Emery. Like its rock and roll forebear, the program featured artist interviews, outtakes from notable radio and television broadcasts; spotlights on notable artists, styles and trends, along with songs that helped illustrate the subject; and time sweeps of individual years through 1981, with a montage of the biggest and most noteworthy hits of each year played. The final hour, Hour 52, was a time sweep of all of the country No. 1 songs from 1944 to the then-present, or approximately 650 individual songs that had topped the Billboard country charts. The special was structured much like the Rock and Roll program, allowing radio programmers to air it as a one-time "marathon" special (such as over holiday weekends), in multiple parts over a period of time, or as one-hour weekly programs.

== Top hits of the year ==
=== Singles released by American artists ===
US	CAN	Single	Artist
16	31	After the Love Slips Away	Earl Thomas Conley
4	5	Ain't No Money	Rosanne Cash
1	1	Always on My Mind	Willie Nelson
5	—	The American Dream	Hank Williams, Jr.
8	3	Another Chance	Tammy Wynette
8	20	Another Honky-Tonk Night on Broadway	David Frizzell and Shelly West
1	1	Any Day Now	Ronnie Milsap
2	1	Are the Good Times Really Over (I Wish a Buck Was Still Silver)	Merle Haggard
19	19	Ashes to Ashes	Terri Gibbs
36	15	Bad News	Boxcar Willie
10	5	Be There for Me Baby	Johnny Lee
1	1	Big City	Merle Haggard
4	4	Big Ole Brew	Mel McDaniel
9	4	Blaze of Glory	Kenny Rogers
1	2	Blue Moon with Heartache	Rosanne Cash
1	1	Bobbie Sue	The Oak Ridge Boys
3	10	Born to Run	Emmylou Harris
2	2	Break It to Me Gently	Juice Newton
6	5	Busted	John Conlee
10	24	Cherokee Fiddle	Johnny Lee
1	1	Close Enough to Perfect	Alabama
1	7	The Clown	Conway Twitty
2	2	A Country Boy Can Survive	Hank Williams, Jr.
1	3	Crying My Heart Out Over You	Ricky Skaggs
3	6	Dancing Your Memory Away	Charly McClain
9	22	Diamonds in the Stars	Ray Price
4	1	Do Me with Love	Janie Fricke
12	35	Don't Look Back	Gary Morris
1	8	Don't Worry 'bout Me Baby	Janie Fricke
15	—	Dreams Die Hard	Gary Morris
4	4	Ever, Never Lovin' You	Ed Bruce
5	28	Everybody Makes Mistakes	Lacy J. Dalton
10	9	Every Time You Cross My Mind (You Break My Heart)	Razzy Bailey
1	10	Finally	T. G. Sheppard
1	1	Fool Hearted Memory	George Strait
1	20	For All the Wrong Reasons	The Bellamy Brothers
18	7	Forty and Fadin'	Ray Price
1	5	Fourteen Carat Mind	Gene Watson
21	9	Get into Reggae Cowboy	The Bellamy Brothers
8	27	Hard Candy Christmas	Dolly Parton
5	1	Have You Ever Been Lonely?	Patsy Cline and Jim Reeves
1	2	He Got You	Ronnie Milsap
7	1	Heartbreak Express	Dolly Parton
1	1	Heartbroke	Ricky Skaggs
8	3	Heavenly Bodies	Earl Thomas Conley
1	6	Honky Tonkin'	Hank Williams, Jr.
1	2	I Don't Care	Ricky Skaggs
2	13	I Don't Know Where to Start	Eddie Rabbitt
2	1	I Don't Think She's in Love Anymore	Charley Pride
3	9	I Just Came Here to Dance	David Frizzell and Shelly West
7	5	I Just Came Home to Count the Memories	John Anderson
11	24	I Just Cut Myself	Ronnie McDowell
9	9	I Lie	Loretta Lynn
17	—	I Think About Your Lovin'	The Osmonds
1	1	I Will Always Love You	Dolly Parton
2	4	I Wish You Could Have Turned My Head (And Left My Heart Alone)	The Oak Ridge Boys
1	1	I Wouldn't Have Missed It for the World	Ronnie Milsap
18	24	I'm Goin' Hurtin'	Joe Stampley
1	3	I'm Gonna Hire a Wino to Decorate Our Home	David Frizzell
3	11	I'm Not That Lonely Yet	Reba McEntire
3	2	If You're Thinking You Want a Stranger (There's One Coming Home)	George Strait
10	—	If You're Waitin' on Me (You're Backin' up)	The Kendalls
15	12	In Like with Each Other	Larry Gatlin & the Gatlin Brothers
19	40	Innocent Lies	Sonny James
1	1	It Ain't Easy Bein' Easy	Janie Fricke
17	—	It Turns Me Inside Out	Lee Greenwood
19	—	It'll Be Her	Tompall & the Glaser Brothers
16	31	It's High Time	Dottie West
16	—	It's Who You Love	Kieran Kane
7	4	Just Give Me What You Think is Fair	Leon Everette
1	2	Just to Satisfy You	Waylon Jennings and Willie Nelson
15	—	Kansas City Lights	Steve Wariner
17	—	The Killin' Kind	Bandana
2	1	Let It Be Me	Willie Nelson
3	1	Listen to the Radio	Don Williams
12	43	A Little Bit Crazy	Eddy Raven
9	30	Livin' in These Troubled Times	Crystal Gayle
1	1	Lonely Nights	Mickey Gilley
1	1	Lord, I Hope This Day Is Good	Don Williams
1	1	Love Will Turn You Around	Kenny Rogers
13	14	Love's Found You and Me	Ed Bruce
8	11	Love's Gonna Fall Here Tonight	Razzy Bailey
19	41	Making Love from Memory	Loretta Lynn
9	19	Midnight Rodeo	Leon Everette
12	7	Mis'ry River	Terri Gibbs
3	3	Mistakes	Don Williams
1	1	Mountain Music	Alabama
1	1	Mountain of Love	Charley Pride
20	—	Natural Love	Petula Clark
12	32	New Cut Road	Bobby Bare
17	—	New Way Out	Karen Brooks
20	44	No Relief in Sight	Con Hunley
1	1	Nobody	Sylvia
19	—	Nothing but the Radio On	James & Michael Younger
12	26	Oh Girl	Con Hunley
19	18	Old Friends	Roger Miller, Willie Nelson (with Ray Price)
1	1	Only One You	T. G. Sheppard
13	—	Only You (And You Alone)	Reba McEntire
9	9	Operator, Long Distance Please	Barbara Mandrell
19	37	Preaching Up a Storm	Mel McDaniel
1	1	Put Your Dreams Away	Mickey Gilley
1	3	Red Neckin' Love Makin' Night	Conway Twitty
1	7	Redneck Girl	The Bellamy Brothers
5	2	Ring on Her Finger, Time on Her Hands	Lee Greenwood
10	12	Rodeo Romeo	Moe Bandy
9	13	Round the Clock Lovin'	Gail Davies
—	16	Run for the Roses	Dan Fogelberg
5	1	Same Ole Me	George Jones
1	3	She Got the Goldmine (I Got the Shaft)	Jerry Reed
1	2	She Left Love All Over Me	Razzy Bailey
19	21	She Used to Sing on Sunday	Larry Gatlin & the Gatlin Brothers
7	6	She's Lying	Lee Greenwood
4	2	She's Not Really Cheating (She's Just Getting Even)	Moe Bandy
10	—	She's Playing Hard to Forget	Eddy Raven
5	1	Shine	Waylon Jennings
8	1	Single Women	Dolly Parton
13	2	(Sittin' On) The Dock of the Bay	Waylon Jennings with Willie Nelson
7	13	16th Avenue	Lacy J. Dalton
13	—	Slow Down	Lacy J. Dalton
1	6	Slow Hand	Conway Twitty
22	16	So Fine	The Oak Ridge Boys
10	1	Some Memories Just Won't Die	Marty Robbins
20	39	Some of My Best Friends Are Old Songs	Louise Mandrell
1	4	Someone Could Lose a Heart Tonight	Eddie Rabbitt
1	39	Somewhere Between Right and Wrong	Earl Thomas Conley
10	20	Soul Searchin'	Leon Everette
9	4	Speak Softly (You're Talking to My Heart)	Gene Watson
17	—	Stay a Little Longer	Mel Tillis
7	—	Step Back	Ronnie McDowell
19	35	Stuck Right in the Middle of Your Love	Billy Swan
5	1	Sure Feels Like Love	Larry Gatlin & the Gatlin Brothers
12	11	Sweet Yesterday	Sylvia
1	1	The Sweetest Thing (I've Ever Known)	Juice Newton
1	1	Take Me Down	Alabama
10	22	Take Me to the Country	Mel McDaniel
3	1	Tears of the Lonely	Mickey Gilley
10	—	Tell Me Why	Earl Thomas Conley
9	5	Tennessee Rose	Emmylou Harris
8	11	This Dream's on Me	Gene Watson
5	5	Through the Years	Kenny Rogers
24	17	Tie Your Dream to Mine	Marty Robbins
1	3	Till You're Gone	Barbara Mandrell
5	20	The Very Best Is You	Charly McClain
1	5	War Is Hell (On the Homefront Too)	T. G. Sheppard
4	3	Watchin' Girls Go By	Ronnie McDowell
2	2	We Did But Now You Don't	Conway Twitty
1	1	What's Forever For	Michael Martin Murphey
7	13	Whatever	The Statler Brothers
18	—	When a Man Loves a Woman	Jack Grayson & Blackjack
14	46	When You Fall in Love	Johnny Lee
11	—	Who Do You Know in California	Eddy Raven
1	15	Wild and Blue	John Anderson
16	15	A Woman's Touch	Tom Jones
4	6	Women Do Know How to Carry On	Waylon Jennings
6	15	Would You Catch a Falling Star	John Anderson
12	—	Years Ago	The Statler Brothers
1	5	Yesterday's Wine	Merle Haggard and George Jones
1	1	You and I	Eddie Rabbitt with Crystal Gayle
5	3	You Never Gave Up on Me	Crystal Gayle
10	—	You Put the Blue in Me	The Whites
16	42	You Still Get to Me in My Dreams	Tammy Wynette
17	7	You Turn Me On, I'm a Radio	Gail Davies
3	—	You'll Be Back (Every Night in My Dreams)	The Statler Brothers
5	26	You're My Bestest Friend	Mac Davis
1	2	You're So Good When You're Bad	Charley Pride
1	10	You're the Best Break This Old Heart Ever Had	Ed Bruce

=== Singles released by Canadian artists ===
US	CAN	Single	Artist
—	19	Another Motel Memory	Ruth Ann
4	1	Another Sleepless Night	Anne Murray
—	6	Brand New Tears (For an Old Heartache)	Carroll Baker
—	9	Did I Forget to Tell Her	Jerry Palmer
—	7	A Dreamer and a Fool (Am I)	Kevin Waara
—	18	Everybody's Going Country	Midnite Rodeo Band
—	8	The Ex-Superstar's Waltz	Ronnie Prophet
—	4	From the Bar Room to the Bedroom	Eddie Eastman
—	9	Good Ol' Time Country Rock 'N' Roll	Dick Damron
7	1	Hey! Baby	Anne Murray
—	7	Honky Tonk Angels and Good Ol' Boys	Dick Damron
—	20	I Am Your Fire	Bill Hersh & Blue Train
—	13	I've Gotta Cowboy in the Saddle	Iris Larratt
—	14	Intimate Strangers	Eddie Eastman
—	7	Kentucky Serenade	Tony Prophet
—	14	Lay Your Heart on the Line	Marie Bottrell
—	10	(Livin' On) Fast Love	Midnite Rodeo Band
—	12	Married or Single	Ruth Ann
—	8	Maybe It's Love This Time	Mercey Brothers
—	11	Nobody Quite Like You	Eddie Eastman
—	15	Overnight Success	John Allan Cameron
—	16	The Parting of the Ways	John Winters
—	9	Raised on Country Music	Family Brown
—	9	Reunion	Dick Damron
—	4	The Second Time Around	Carroll Baker
—	10	Should You Ever Think of Cheating	John Winters
61	4	Some Never Stand a Chance	Family Brown
—	16	Starlight Lady	Gurney Anderson
—	10	Sugartime	Glory-Anne Carriere
—	6	Summertime	The Good Brothers
—	17	Ten Years Old and Barefoot	Gary Fjellgaard
—	10	Took a Train to Vegas	Gilles Godard
—	10	Took You Back Again	Canadian Zephyr
—	15	You Never Really Loved Me	David Thompson

== Top new album releases ==
US	Album	Artist	Record label
23	16th Avenue	Lacy J. Dalton	Columbia
1	Always on My Mind	Willie Nelson	Columbia
16	Anniversary – 10 Years of Hits	George Jones	Epic
5	Best Little Whorehouse in Texas Soundtrack	Various Artists	MCA
22	Big Al Downing	Big Al Downing	Team
17	Biggest Hits	Marty Robbins	Columbia
20	The Bird	Jerry Reed	RCA
3	Black on Black	Waylon Jennings	RCA
1	Bobbie Sue	The Oak Ridge Boys	MCA
23	Brotherly Love	Gary Stewart & Dean Dillon	RCA
21	Busted	John Conlee	MCA
10	Charley Sings Everybody's Choice	Charley Pride	RCA
9	Christmas	The Oak Ridge Boys	MCA
25	Come Back to Me	Marty Robbins	Columbia
21	Conway's #1 Classics Volume One	Conway Twitty	Elektra
8	The David Frizzell & Shelly West Album	David Frizzell & Shelly West	Warner Bros./Viva
7	Dolly Parton's Greatest Hits	Dolly Parton	RCA
15	Dream Maker	Conway Twitty	Elektra
12	The Dukes of Hazzard (Soundtrack)	Various Artists	Scotti Brothers
7	The Family's Fine, But This One's All Mine!	David Frizzell	Warner Bros./Viva
10	Feelin' Right	Razzy Bailey	RCA
4	Finally!	T. G. Sheppard	Warner Bros./Curb
19	Get Closer	Linda Ronstadt	Asylum
3	Going Where the Lonely Go	Merle Haggard	Epic
9	Greatest Hits	The Bellamy Brothers	Warner Bros./Curb
5	Hank Williams, Jr.'s Greatest Hits	Hank Williams, Jr.	Elektra/Curb
5	Heartbreak Express	Dolly Parton	RCA
3	High Notes	Hank Williams, Jr.	Elektra/Curb
1	Highways & Heartaches	Ricky Skaggs	Epic
7	...In Black and White	Barbara Mandrell	MCA
4	Inside	Ronnie Milsap	RCA
12	Inside Out	Lee Greenwood	MCA
15	It Ain't Easy	Janie Fricke	Columbia
2	Just Sylvia	Sylvia	RCA
9	Last Date	Emmylou Harris	Warner Bros.
17	The Legend Goes On	The Statler Brothers	Mercury
6	Listen to the Radio	Don Williams	MCA
22	Love to Burn	Ronnie McDowell	Epic
5	Love Will Turn You Around	Kenny Rogers	Liberty
10	The Man with the Golden Thumb	Jerry Reed	RCA
14	Michael Martin Murphey	Michael Martin Murphey	Liberty
1	Mountain Music	Alabama	RCA
20	Number Ones	Conway Twitty	MCA
25	Perfect Stranger	T. G. Sheppard	Warner Bros./Curb
10	Put Your Dreams Away	Mickey Gilley	Epic
7	Quiet Lies	Juice Newton	Capitol
5	Radio Romance	Eddie Rabbitt	Warner Bros.
18	Seasons of the Heart	John Denver	RCA
19	She's Not Really Cheatin' (She's Just Gettin' Even)	Moe Bandy	Columbia
10	Somewhere Between Right and Wrong	Earl Thomas Conley	RCA
6	Somewhere in the Stars	Rosanne Cash	Columbia
5	Southern Comfort	Conway Twitty	Elektra
18	Strait from the Heart	George Strait	MCA
17	Strong Weakness	The Bellamy Brothers	Elektra/Curb
18	Sure Feels Like Love	Larry Gatlin and the Gatlin Brothers	Columbia
21	The Survivors Live	Johnny Cash, Jerry Lee Lewis and Carl Perkins	Columbia
4	A Taste of Yesterday's Wine	Merle Haggard & George Jones	Epic
21	Tom Jones Country	Tom Jones	Mercury
22	Too Good to Hurry	Charly McClain	Epic
14	True Love	Crystal Gayle	Elektra
22	Unlimited	Reba McEntire	Mercury
15	When We Were Boys	The Bellamy Brothers	Elektra/Curb
3	Wild & Blue	John Anderson	Warner Bros.
7	Windows	Charlie Daniels	Epic
4	The Winning Hand	Various Artists	Monument
3	WWII	Waylon Jennings & Willie Nelson	RCA

=== Other top albums ===
US	Album	Artist	Record label
54	After All These Years	Tompall & the Glaser Brothers	Elektra
29	Ain't Got Nothin' to Lose	Bobby Bare	Columbia
37	Amazing Grace	Cristy Lane	Liberty
53	Back in the Country	Roy Acuff	Elektra
63	Backslidin'	Joe Stampley	Epic
34	Best of Boxcar, Vol. 1	Boxcar Willie	Main Street
62	The Best of Willie Nelson	Willie Nelson	RCA
39	Biggest Hits	Mickey Gilley	Epic
64	Biggest Hits	Tammy Wynette	Epic
64	Bluegrass Spectacular	Osborne Brothers	RCA
47	Changes	Tanya Tucker	Arista
62	Charley Pride Live	Charley Pride	RCA
35	Conway's #1 Classics Volume Two	Conway Twitty	Elektra
50	A Country Christmas	Various Artists	RCA
29	The Elvis Medley	Elvis Presley	RCA
52	Family & Friends	Ricky Skaggs	Rounder
39	Gary Morris	Gary Morris	Warner Bros.
40	A Gatlin Family Christmas	Larry Gatlin and the Gatlin Brothers	Columbia
41	Givin' Herself Away	Gail Davies	Warner Bros.
41	Goin' Home for Christmas	Merle Haggard	Epic
62	Good Love & Heartbreak	Tammy Wynette	Epic
49	Greatest Hits	Moe Bandy	Columbia
34	Greatest Hits	Janie Fricke	Columbia
43	Greatest Hits	Charly McClain	Epic
59	He Set My Life to Music	Barbara Mandrell	MCA
48	Heartbreak	Rodney Lay and the Wild West	Churchill
42	Here's to Us	Cristy Lane	Liberty
27	Honkytonk Man (Soundtrack)	Various Artists	Warner Bros.
29	The Hottest Night of the Year	Anne Murray	Capitol
63	I Write It Down	Ed Bruce	MCA
37	I'm Goin' Hurtin'	Joe Stampley	Epic
38	It's a Long Way to Daytona	Mel Tillis	Elektra
59	Jack Grayson Sings	Jack Grayson	Joe-Wes
26	Just Hooked on Country	Albert Coleman's Atlanta Pops	Epic
38	Kieran Kane	Kieran Kane	Elektra
27	Last Train to Heaven	Boxcar Willie	Main Street
59	A Little More Razz	Razzy Bailey	RCA
67	Live	Tanya Tucker	MCA
58	Mel Tillis' Greatest Hits	Mel Tillis	Elektra
48	Memories of Christmas	Elvis Presley	RCA
37	Merle Haggard's Greatest Hits	Merle Haggard	MCA
45	Night After Night	Jacky Ward	Asylum
56	Oh Girl	Con Hunley	Warner Bros.
33	Old Home Town	Glen Campbell	Atlantic America
54	The Osmond Brothers	The Osmond Brothers	Elektra/Curb
41	Pistol Packin' Mama	Hoyt Axton	Jeremiah
49	The Roy Clark Show Live from Austin City Limits	Roy Clark	Churchill
31	Soft Touch	Tammy Wynette	Epic
33	Some Days It Rains All Night Long	Terri Gibbs	MCA
32	Sounds Like Love	Johnny Lee	Full Moon
35	Steve Wariner	Steve Wariner	RCA
38	Stickin' Together	The Kendalls	Mercury
56	Sugar Free	Dave Rowland	Elektra
43	Take Me to the Country	Mel McDaniel	Capitol
67	Talk to Me	Cindy Hurt	Churchill
27	This Dream's on Me	Gene Watson	MCA
43	Turned Loose	Roy Clark	Churchill
38	Walk On	Karen Brooks	Warner Bros.
37	When a Man Loves a Woman	Jack Grayson	Koala
44	(You're My) Super Woman/(You're My) Incredible Man	Louise Mandrell & R.C. Bannon	RCA

== On television ==
=== Regular series ===
- Barbara Mandrell and the Mandrell Sisters (1980–1982, NBC)
- Hee Haw (1969–1993, syndicated)
- Pop! Goes the Country (1974–1982, syndicated)
- That Nashville Music (1970–1985, syndicated)

== Births ==
- February 3 — Jessica Harp, member of The Wreckers.
- April 12 — Easton Corbin, singer of the early 2010s, with hits including "A Little More Country Than That"
- April 24 — Kelly Clarkson, pop singer who crossed over to country for hits including "Because of You" (duet with Reba McEntire) and "Don't You Wanna Stay" (duet with Jason Aldean); first winner of American Idol.
- May 31 — Casey James, third-place finalist on the ninth season of American Idol.
- July 5 — Dave Haywood, member of Lady Antebellum.
- August 28 — LeAnn Rimes, country pop superstar starting in the late 1990s (decade).
- December 16 — Frankie Ballard, country singer of the 2010s best known for "Helluva Life"

== Deaths ==
- July 2 — DeFord Bailey, 82, harmonicaist and first African American performer on the Grand Ole Opry.
- October 27 — Hoyt Hawkins, 55, member of The Jordanaires.
- December 8 — Marty Robbins, 57, prolific, multi-styled artist for more than 30 years (heart failure).

== Country Music Hall of Fame Inductees ==
- Lefty Frizzell (1928–1975)
- Roy Horton (1914–2003)
- Marty Robbins (1925–1982)

== Major awards ==
=== Grammy Awards ===
- Best Female Country Vocal Performance — "Break It to Me Gently", Juice Newton
- Best Male Country Vocal Performance — "Always on My Mind", Willie Nelson
- Best Country Performance by a Duo or Group with Vocal — "Mountain Music", Alabama
- Best Country Instrumental Performance — "Alabama Jubilee," Roy Clark
- Best Country Song — "Always on My Mind", Johnny Christopher, Wayne Carson Thompson and Mark James (Performer: Willie Nelson)

=== Juno Awards ===
- Country Male Vocalist of the Year — Ronnie Hawkins
- Country Female Vocalist of the Year — Anne Murray
- Country Group or Duo of the Year — The Good Brothers

=== Academy of Country Music ===
- Entertainer of the Year — Alabama
- Song of the Year — "Are the Good Times Really Over (I Wish a Buck Was Still Silver)", Merle Haggard (Performer: Merle Haggard)
- Single of the Year — "Always on My Mind," Willie Nelson
- Album of the Year — Always on My Mind, Willie Nelson
- Top Male Vocalist — Ronnie Milsap
- Top Female Vocalist — Sylvia
- Top Vocal Duo — Shelly West and David Frizzell
- Top Vocal Group — Alabama
- Top New Male Vocalist — Michael Martin Murphey
- Top New Female Vocalist — Karen Brooks

=== Canadian Country Music Association ===
- Entertainer of the Year — Family Brown
- Male Artist of the Year — Terry Carisse
- Female Artist of the Year — Carroll Baker
- Group of the Year — Family Brown
- SOCAN Song of the Year — "Some Never Stand a Chance", Family Brown (Performer: Family Brown)
- Single of the Year — "Some Never Stand a Chance", Family Brown
- Album of the Year — Raised on Country Music, Family Brown
- Vista Rising Star Award — Ruth Ann

=== Country Music Association ===
- Entertainer of the Year — Alabama
- Song of the Year — "Always on My Mind", Johnny Christopher, Wayne Carson Thompson and Mark James (Performer: Willie Nelson)
- Single of the Year — "Always on My Mind", Willie Nelson
- Album of the Year — Always on My Mind, Willie Nelson
- Male Vocalist of the Year — Ricky Skaggs
- Female Vocalist of the Year — Janie Fricke
- Vocal Duo of the Year — David Frizzell and Shelly West
- Vocal Group of the Year — Alabama
- Horizon Award — Ricky Skaggs
- Instrumentalist of the Year — Chet Atkins
- Instrumental Group of the Year — Alabama

== Other links ==
- Country Music Association
- Inductees of the Country Music Hall of Fame
