= List of RPM number-one country singles of 1982 =

These are the Canadian number-one country songs of 1982, per the RPM Country Tracks chart.

Issue date	Title	Artist
January 16	Love in the First Degree	Alabama
January 23	I Wouldn't Have Missed It for the World	Ronnie Milsap
January 30	I Wouldn't Have Missed It for the World	Ronnie Milsap
February 6	The Sweetest Thing (I've Ever Known)	Juice Newton
February 13	Have You Ever Been Lonely?	Patsy Cline and Jim Reeves
February 20	Lonely Nights	Mickey Gilley
February 27	Only One You	T. G. Sheppard
March 6	Lord I Hope This Day is Good	Don Williams
March 13	Do Me with Love	Janie Fricke
March 20	Shine	Waylon Jennings
March 27	Mountain of Love	Charley Pride
April 3	Bobbie Sue	The Oak Ridge Boys
April 10	Bobbie Sue	The Oak Ridge Boys
April 17	Big City	Merle Haggard
April 24	Another Sleepless Night	Anne Murray
May 1	Same Ole Me	George Jones
May 8	Same Ole Me	George Jones
May 15	Mountain Music	Alabama
May 22	Mountain Music	Alabama
May 29	Single Women	Dolly Parton
June 5	Always on My Mind	Willie Nelson
June 12	Always on My Mind	Willie Nelson
June 19	Listen to the Radio	Don Williams
June 26	Tears of the Lonely	Mickey Gilley
July 3	Any Day Now	Ronnie Milsap
July 10	Any Day Now	Ronnie Milsap
July 17	Any Day Now	Ronnie Milsap
July 24	Take Me Down	Alabama
July 31	Take Me Down	Alabama
August 7	I Don't Think She's in Love Anymore	Charley Pride
August 14	Are the Good Times Really Over (I Wish a Buck Was Still Silver)	Merle Haggard
August 21	Heartbreak Express	Dolly Parton
August 28	Some Memories Just Won't Die	Marty Robbins
September 4	Nobody	Sylvia
September 11	Fool Hearted Memory	George Strait
September 18	Love Will Turn You Around	Kenny Rogers
September 25	Love Will Turn You Around	Kenny Rogers
October 2	Hey! Baby	Anne Murray
October 9	Put Your Dreams Away	Mickey Gilley
October 16	What's Forever For	Michael Martin Murphey
October 23	I Will Always Love You	Dolly Parton
October 30	I Will Always Love You	Dolly Parton
November 6	Let It Be Me	Willie Nelson
November 13	Let It Be Me	Willie Nelson
November 20	Close Enough to Perfect	Alabama
November 27	Close Enough to Perfect	Alabama
December 4	Heartbroke	Ricky Skaggs
December 11	It Ain't Easy Bein' Easy	Janie Fricke
December 18	You and I	Eddie Rabbitt and Crystal Gayle
December 25	Sure Feels Like Love	Larry Gatlin and the Gatlin Brothers

== See also ==
- 1982 in music
- List of number-one country hits of 1982 (U.S.)
