= List of Hot Country Singles number ones of 1982 =

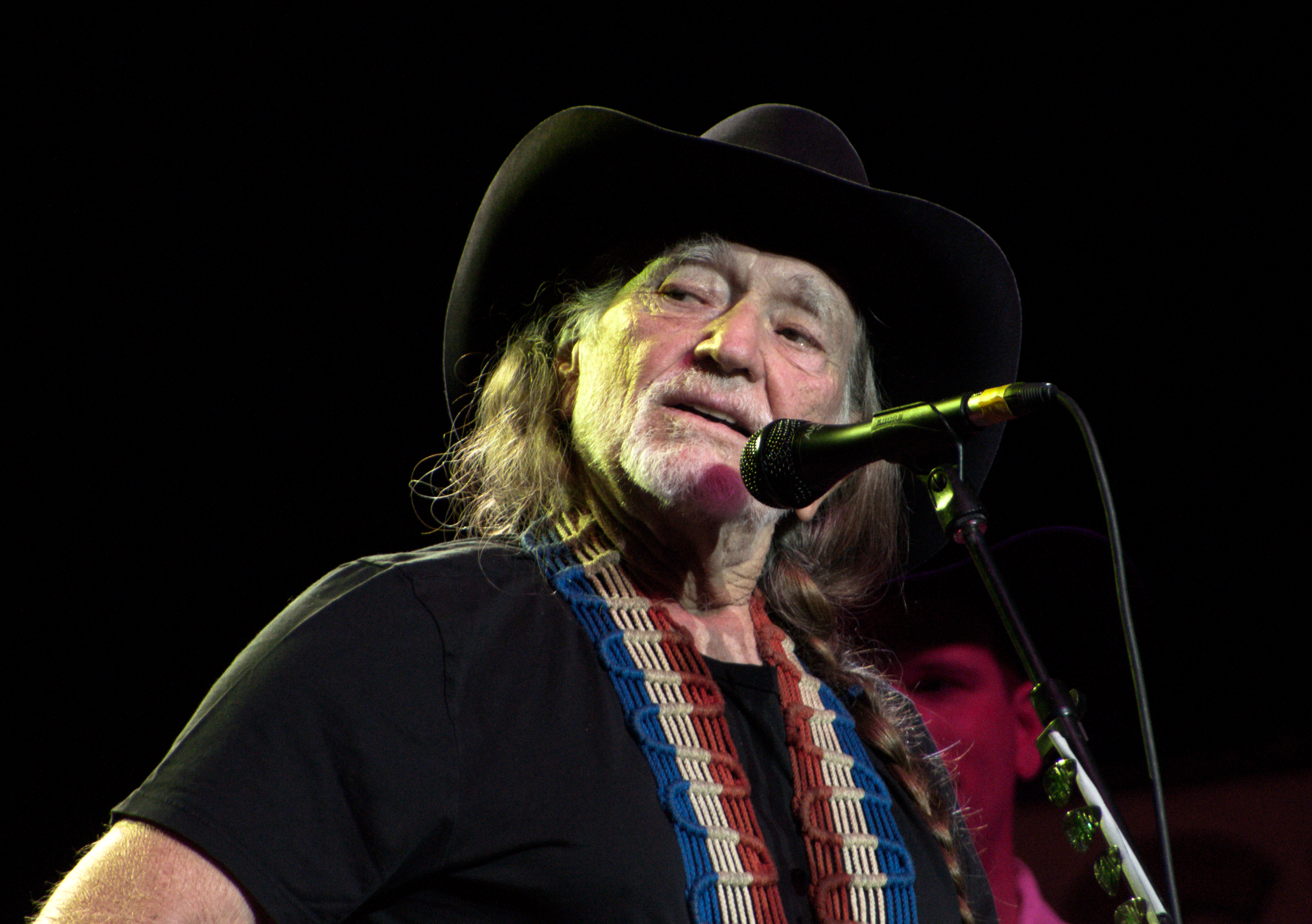
Willie Nelson (pictured in 2009) topped the chart both in his own right and in a duet with Waylon Jennings.

Hot Country Songs is a chart that ranks the top-performing country music songs in the United States, published by Billboard magazine. In 1982, 48 different singles topped the chart, then published under the title Hot Country Singles, in 52 issues of the magazine, based on playlists submitted by country music radio stations and sales reports submitted by stores.

The band Alabama achieved the most number ones by a single act, topping the chart four times. Ronnie Milsap, T. G. Sheppard, Ricky Skaggs and Conway Twitty each had three number ones. Alabama, Twitty and Willie Nelson tied for the most weeks in the top spot with four each. Nelson's four weeks consisted of two weeks with "Always on My Mind" followed immediately by a further two with "Just to Satisfy You", a collaboration with Waylon Jennings. In October, Dolly Parton topped the chart with the double A-sided single "I Will Always Love You" / "Do I Ever Cross Your Mind". Both tracks were re-recordings of songs she had previously released in the 1970s, and the original recording of "I Will Always Love You" had reached number one in 1974, making Parton the first artist to top the chart with two different recordings of the same song.

Ed Bruce, best known for writing "Mammas Don't Let Your Babies Grow Up to Be Cowboys", a highly successful chart-topper for Waylon Jennings and Willie Nelson four years earlier, achieved his only number one as a performer in 1982 with "You're the Best Break This Old Heart Ever Had". Several other artists reached the top spot for the first time in 1982, including Juice Newton with "The Sweetest Thing (I've Ever Known)", Ricky Skaggs with "Crying My Heart Out Over You", Michael Murphey (later known as Michael Martin Murphy) with "What's Forever For", and John Anderson with "Wild and Blue". In August George Strait topped the chart for the first time with "Fool Hearted Memory"; Strait would go on to top the chart regularly for more than 25 years, achieving a record-breaking 44 Hot Country number ones.

== Chart history ==
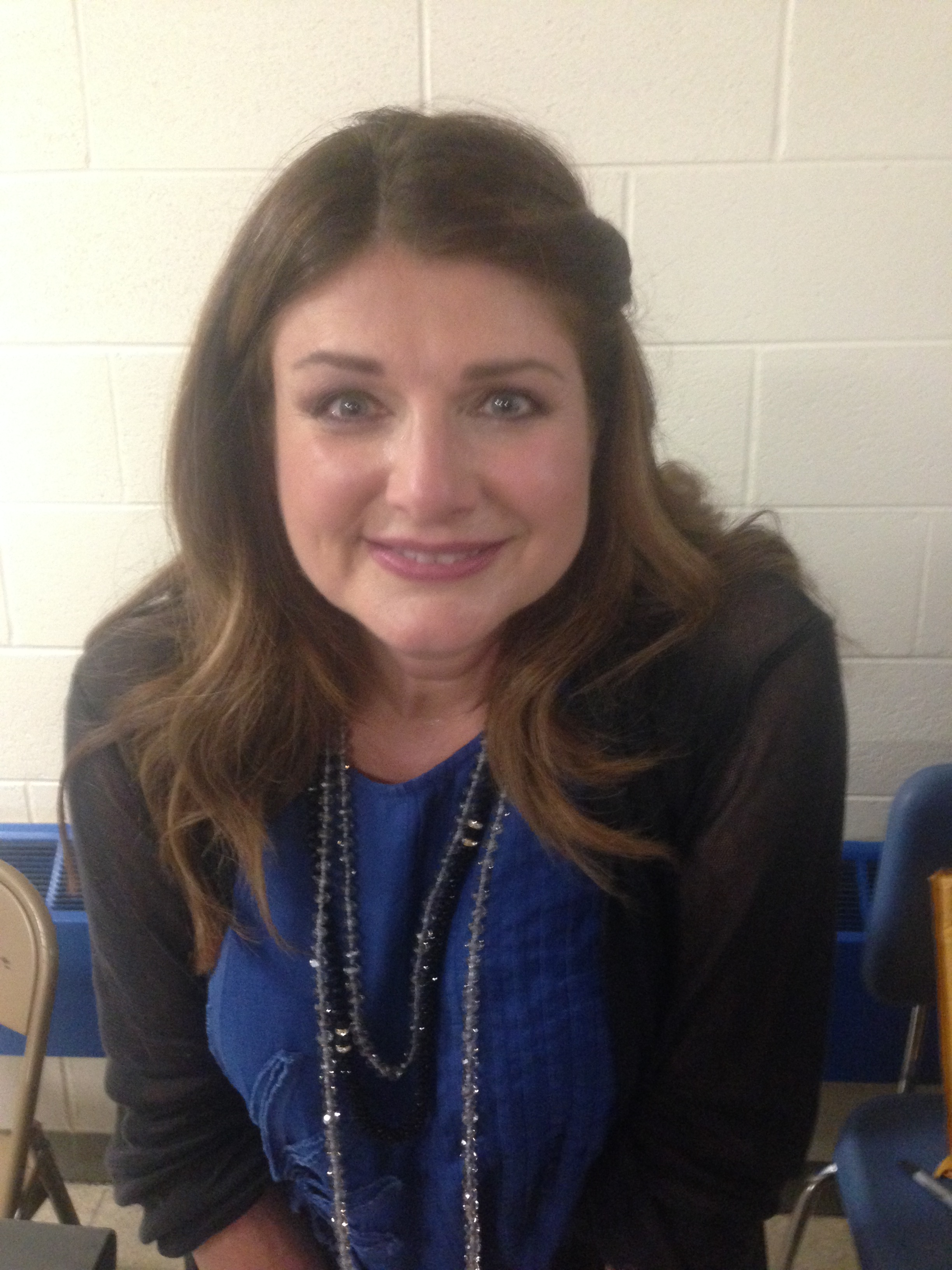
Sylvia (pictured in 2016) topped the chart with "Nobody", which was her only song to cross over to the Billboard Hot 100.

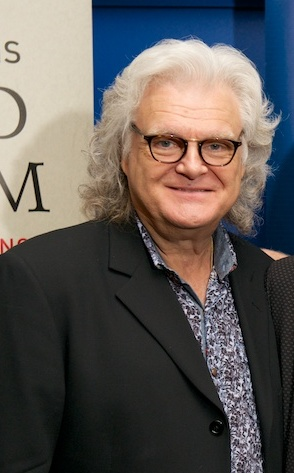
Ricky Skaggs (pictured in 2016) had three number ones in 1982.

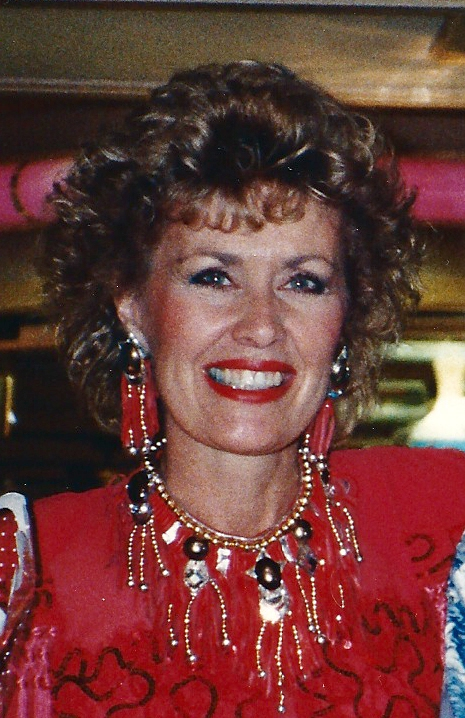
Janie Fricke was a two-time chart-topper in 1982.

Table of number one songs
Issue date	Title	Artist(s)	Ref.
January 2	"Love in the First Degree" / "Ride the Train"^{[a]}	Alabama	
January 9	"Fourteen Carat Mind"	Gene Watson	
January 16	"I Wouldn't Have Missed It for the World"	Ronnie Milsap	
January 23	"Red Neckin' Love Makin' Night"	Conway Twitty	
January 30	"The Sweetest Thing (I've Ever Known)"	Juice Newton	
February 6	"Lonely Nights"	Mickey Gilley	
February 13	"Someone Could Lose a Heart Tonight"	Eddie Rabbitt	
February 20	"Only One You"	T. G. Sheppard	
February 27	"Lord, I Hope This Day Is Good"	Don Williams	
March 6	"You're the Best Break This Old Heart Ever Had"	Ed Bruce	
March 13	"Blue Moon with Heartache"	Rosanne Cash	
March 20	"Mountain of Love"	Charley Pride	
March 27	"She Left Love All Over Me"	Razzy Bailey	
April 3	"Bobbie Sue"	The Oak Ridge Boys	
April 10	"Big City"	Merle Haggard	
April 17	"The Clown"	Conway Twitty	
April 24	"Crying My Heart Out Over You"	Ricky Skaggs	
May 1	"Mountain Music"	Alabama	
May 8	"Always on My Mind"	Willie Nelson	
May 15	"Always on My Mind"	Willie Nelson	
May 22	"Just to Satisfy You"	Waylon Jennings and Willie Nelson	
May 29	"Just to Satisfy You"	Waylon Jennings and Willie Nelson	
June 5	"Finally"	T. G. Sheppard	
June 12	"For All the Wrong Reasons"	The Bellamy Brothers	
June 19	"Slow Hand"	Conway Twitty	
June 26	"Slow Hand"	Conway Twitty	
July 3	"Any Day Now"	Ronnie Milsap	
July 10	"Don't Worry 'bout Me Baby"	Janie Fricke	
July 17	"'Till You're Gone"	Barbara Mandrell	
July 24	"Take Me Down"	Alabama	
July 31	"I Don't Care"	Ricky Skaggs	
August 7	"Honky Tonkin'"	Hank Williams Jr.	
August 14	"I'm Gonna Hire a Wino to Decorate Our Home"	David Frizzell	
August 21	"Nobody"	Sylvia	
August 28	"Fool Hearted Memory"	George Strait	
September 4	"Love Will Turn You Around"	Kenny Rogers	
September 11	"She Got the Goldmine (I Got the Shaft)"	Jerry Reed	
September 18	"She Got the Goldmine (I Got the Shaft)"	Jerry Reed	
September 25	"What's Forever For"	Michael Murphey	
October 2	"Put Your Dreams Away"	Mickey Gilley	
October 9	"Yesterday's Wine"	Merle Haggard and George Jones	
October 16	"I Will Always Love You" / "Do I Ever Cross Your Mind"^{[a]}	Dolly Parton	
October 23	"He Got You"	Ronnie Milsap	
October 30	"Close Enough to Perfect"	Alabama	
November 6	"You're So Good When You're Bad"	Charley Pride	
November 13	"Heartbroke"	Ricky Skaggs	
November 20	"War Is Hell (On the Homefront Too)"	T. G. Sheppard	
November 27	"It Ain't Easy Bein' Easy"	Janie Fricke	
December 4	"You and I"	Eddie Rabbitt with Crystal Gayle	
December 11	"Redneck Girl"	The Bellamy Brothers	
December 18	"Somewhere Between Right and Wrong"	Earl Thomas Conley	
December 25	"Wild and Blue"	John Anderson	

a. Double A-sided single

== See also ==
- 1982 in music
- List of artists who reached number one on the U.S. country chart
