= List of Hot Country Singles number ones of 1981 =

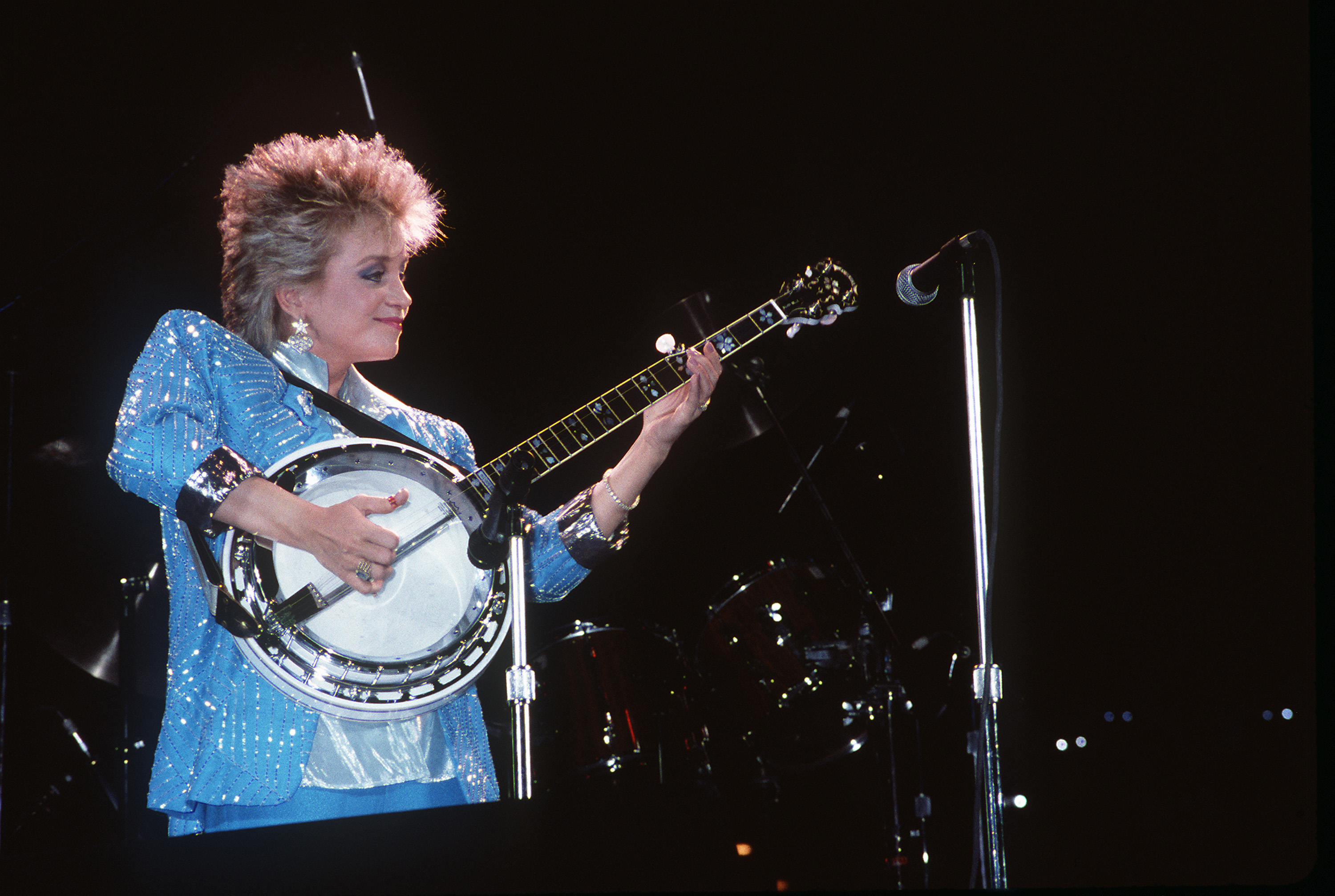
Barbara Mandrell topped the chart with "I Was Country When Country Wasn't Cool", which came to be regarded as her signature song.

Hot Country Songs is a chart that ranks the top-performing country music songs in the United States, published by Billboard magazine. In 1981, 48 different singles topped the chart, then published under the title Hot Country Singles, in 52 issues of the magazine, based on playlists submitted by country music radio stations and sales reports submitted by stores.

Alabama, Razzy Bailey, T. G. Sheppard and Hank Williams Jr. tied for the most number ones of the year, with three chart-toppers each. As Alabama's "Feels So Right" was one of the few songs to spend a second week at number one, the band had the highest total number of weeks in the top spot, with four. Ten other acts achieved more than one number one in 1981. Several acts topped the chart for the first time in 1981: Charly McClain with "Who's Cheatin' Who", Sylvia with "Drifter", Rosanne Cash with "Seven Year Ache", Earl Thomas Conley with "Fire and Smoke", Ronnie McDowell with "Older Women", Steve Wariner with "All Roads Lead to You", and the duo of David Frizzell and Shelly West with "You're the Reason God Made Oklahoma". Shelly West's appearance at number one fell between two chart-toppers achieved in 1981 by her mother, Dottie West.

"King of Rock and Roll" Elvis Presley, who had died in 1977, achieved a posthumous number one in March with the single "Guitar Man". Upon its original release in 1967, the song had been a minor hit on Billboard's all-genres chart, the Hot 100. More than three years after his death, however, the song was re-released to promote a similarly titled album which combined existing Presley vocals with new instrumental backing tracks created in Nashville by producer Felton Jarvis, and this time became a country number one. Two songs which topped the country chart consecutively in January also topped the Hot 100, albeit several weeks later. Eddie Rabbitt's "I Love a Rainy Night" topped the country chart in the issue of Billboard dated January 10, and was replaced the following week by Dolly Parton's "9 to 5". On the Hot 100, Parton's song reached the top in the issue dated February 21, was replaced by Rabbitt's song the following week, but then returned to the top spot in the issue dated March 14. The two songs were among just four country songs which topped the Hot 100 during the 1980s, and the only two to do so consecutively. Both songs, along with "I Don't Need You" by Kenny Rogers, also crossed over to adult contemporary radio with sufficient impact to top Billboard's Adult Contemporary airplay chart, reflecting increasing pop and soft rock influences on mainstream country music.

== Chart history ==
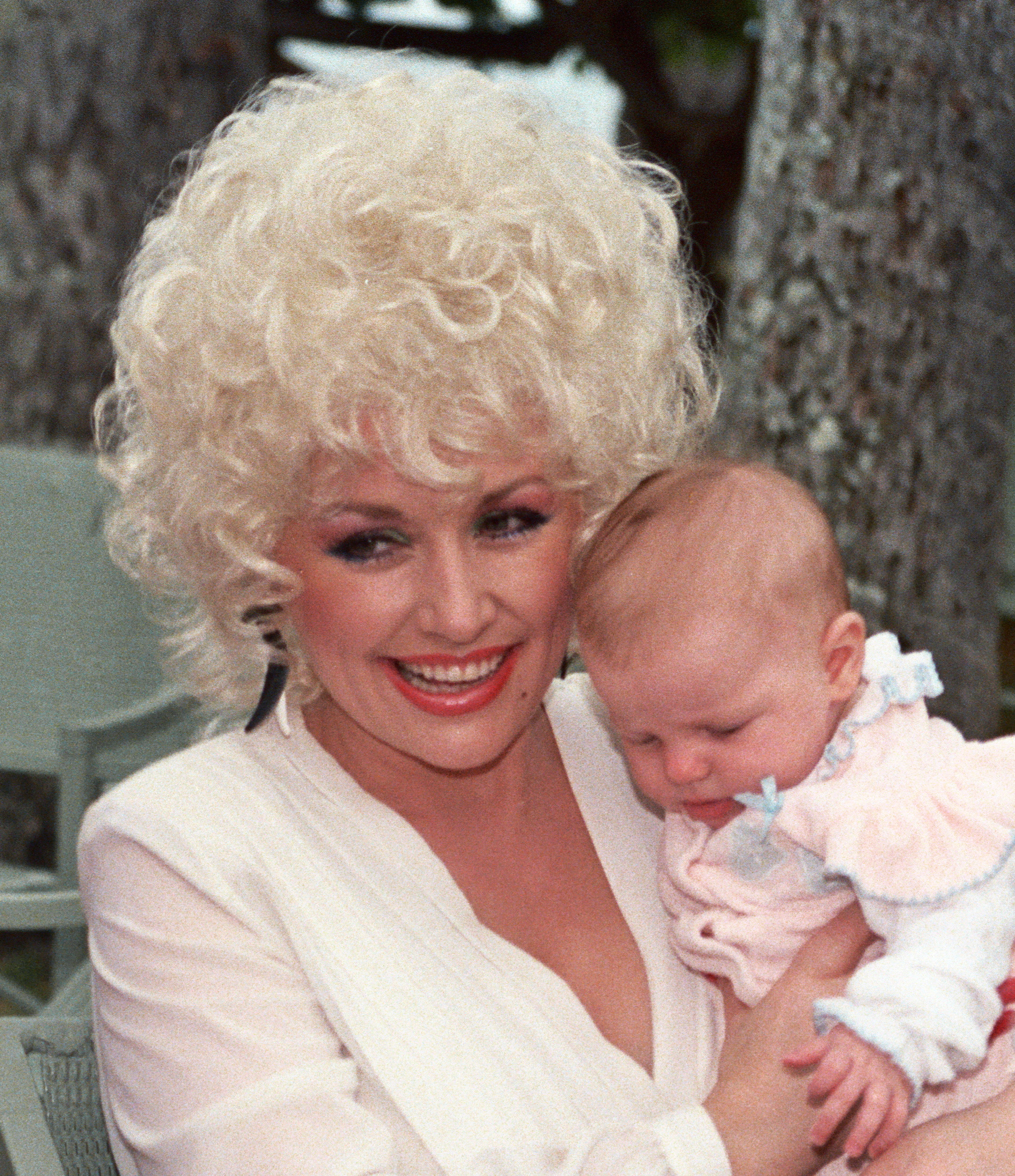
Dolly Parton's "9 to 5" was a country chart-topper and also reached number one on the Billboard Hot 100.

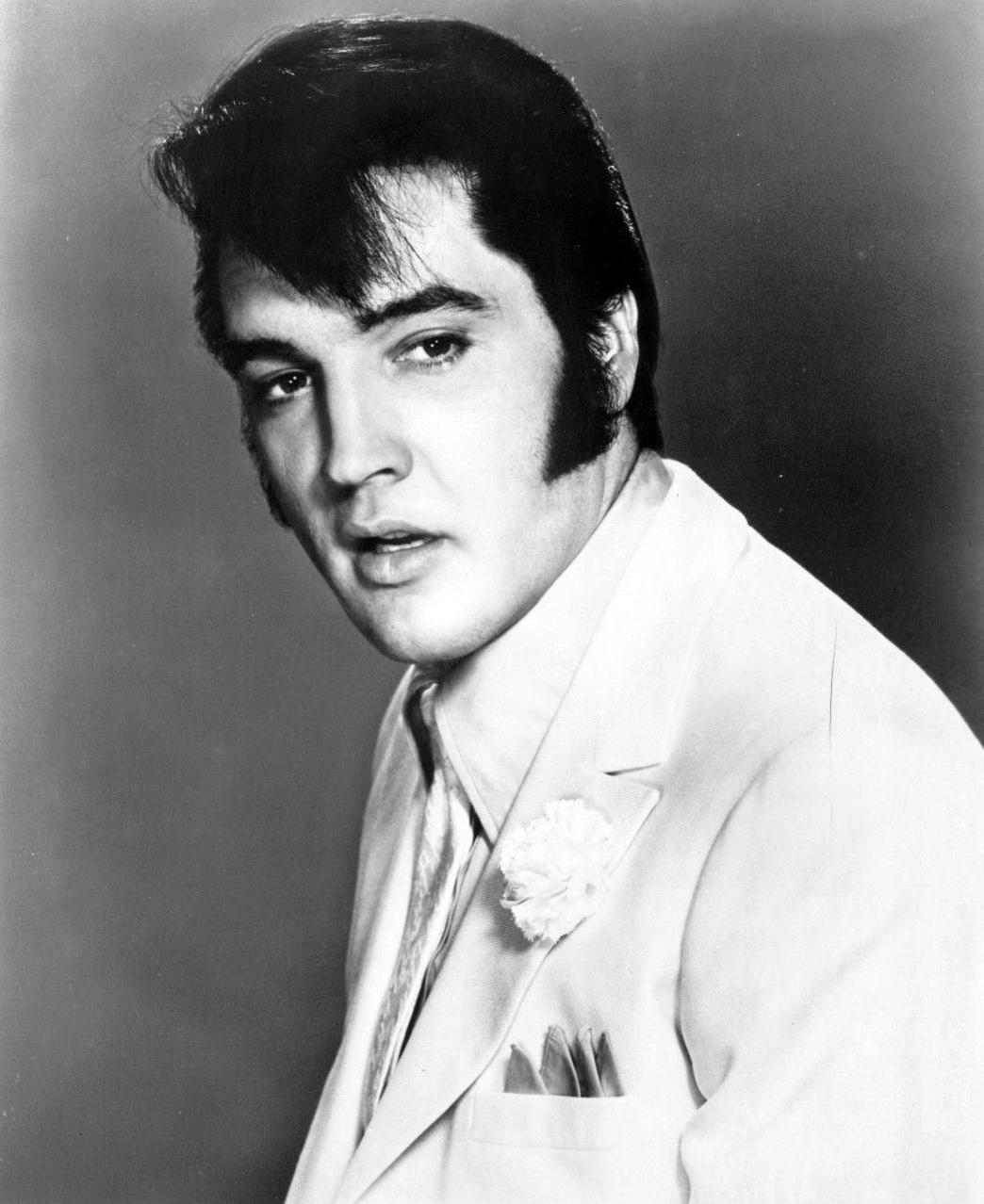
A re-release of Elvis Presley's "Guitar Man" gave the "King of Rock and Roll" a country number one more than three years after his death in 1977.

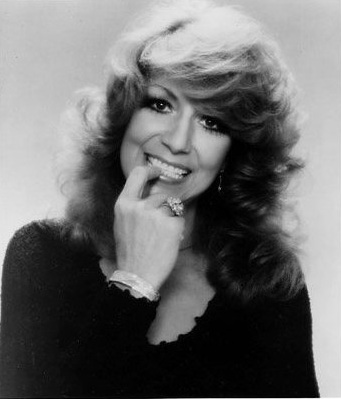
Dottie West had two number ones in 1981. Her daughter Shelly West had one.

Issue date	Title	Artist(s)	Ref.
January 3	"One in a Million"	Johnny Lee	
January 10	"I Think I'll Just Stay Here and Drink"	Merle Haggard	
January 17	"I Love a Rainy Night"	Eddie Rabbitt	
January 24	"9 to 5"	Dolly Parton	
January 31	"I Feel Like Loving You Again"	T. G. Sheppard	
February 7	"I Keep Coming Back" / "True Life Country Music"^{[a]}	Razzy Bailey	
February 14	"Who's Cheatin' Who"	Charly McClain	
February 21	"Southern Rains"	Mel Tillis	
February 28	"Are You Happy Baby?"	Dottie West	
March 7	"Do You Love as Good as You Look"	The Bellamy Brothers	
March 14	"Guitar Man"	Elvis Presley	
March 21	"Angel Flying Too Close to the Ground"	Willie Nelson	
March 28	"Texas Women"	Hank Williams Jr.	
April 4	"Drifter"	Sylvia	
April 11	"You're the Reason God Made Oklahoma"	David Frizzell and Shelly West	
April 18	"Old Flame"	Alabama	
April 25	"A Headache Tomorrow (Or a Heartache Tonight)"	Mickey Gilley	
May 2	"Rest Your Love on Me" / "I Am the Dreamer (You Are the Dream)"^{[a]}	Conway Twitty	
May 9	"Am I Losing You"	Ronnie Milsap	
May 16	"I Loved 'Em Every One"	T. G. Sheppard	
May 23	"Seven Year Ache"	Rosanne Cash	
May 30	"Elvira"	The Oak Ridge Boys	
June 6	"Friends" / "Anywhere There's a Jukebox"^{[a]}	Razzy Bailey	
June 13	"What Are We Doin' in Love"	Dottie West with Kenny Rogers	
June 20	"But You Know I Love You"	Dolly Parton	
June 27	"Blessed Are the Believers"	Anne Murray	
July 4	"I Was Country When Country Wasn't Cool"	Barbara Mandrell	
July 11	"Fire and Smoke"	Earl Thomas Conley	
July 18	"Feels So Right"	Alabama	
July 25	"Feels So Right"	Alabama	
August 1	"Dixie on My Mind"	Hank Williams Jr.	
August 8	"Too Many Lovers"	Crystal Gayle	
August 15	"I Don't Need You"	Kenny Rogers	
August 22	"I Don't Need You"	Kenny Rogers	
August 29	"(There's) No Gettin' Over Me"	Ronnie Milsap	
September 5	"(There's) No Gettin' Over Me"	Ronnie Milsap	
September 12	"Older Women"	Ronnie McDowell	
September 19	"You Don't Know Me"	Mickey Gilley	
September 26	"Tight Fittin' Jeans"	Conway Twitty	
October 3	"Midnight Hauler"	Razzy Bailey	
October 10	"Party Time"	T. G. Sheppard	
October 17	"Step by Step"	Eddie Rabbitt	
October 24	"Never Been So Loved (In All My Life)"	Charley Pride	
October 31	"Never Been So Loved (In All My Life)"	Charley Pride	
November 7	"Fancy Free"	The Oak Ridge Boys	
November 14	"My Baby Thinks He's a Train"	Rosanne Cash	
November 21	"All My Rowdy Friends (Have Settled Down)"	Hank Williams Jr.	
November 28	"My Favorite Memory"	Merle Haggard	
December 5	"Bet Your Heart on Me"	Johnny Lee	
December 12	"Still Doin' Time"	George Jones	
December 19	"All Roads Lead to You"	Steve Wariner	
December 26	"Love in the First Degree"	Alabama	

a. Double A-sided single

== See also ==
- 1981 in music
- List of artists who reached number one on the U.S. country chart
