= The Best of Willie Nelson =

The Best of Willie Nelson may refer to:

- The Best of Willie Nelson (1973 album)
- The Best of Willie Nelson (1982 album)
