= Ralph Murphy =

Ralph Murphy may refer to:

- Ralph Murphy (director)
- Ralph Murphy (musician)
