= Inside (Ronnie Milsap album) =

Studio album by Ronnie Milsap
- Released: May 1982
- Studios: GroundStar Laboratories, Music City Music Hall and Woodland Sound Studios (Nashville, Tennessee)
- Genre: Country
- Length: 37:40
- Label: RCA Victor
- Producers: Tom Collins; Ronnie Milsap

Ronnie Milsap chronology
There's No Gettin' Over Me (1981)	Inside (1982)	Keyed Up (1983)

Singles from Inside
- 1. "Any Day Now" Released: April 1982; 2. "He Got You" Released: August 7, 1982; 3. "Inside" Released: November 1982

Professional ratings
Review scores
Source	Rating
AllMusic	4.5/5 stars

Inside is the fourteenth studio album by American country music artist Ronnie Milsap, released in 1982 by RCA Records. It contains the hits "Any Day Now", "Inside", and "He Got You".

== Track listing ==
No.	Title	Writer(s)	Length
1.	"Any Day Now"	Burt Bacharach, Bob Hilliard	3:42
2.	"Inside"	Mike Reid	4:03
3.	"Carolina Dreams"	Kye Fleming, Dennis Morgan	3:59
4.	"Wrong End of the Rainbow"	Richard Leigh, Milton Blackford	4:04
5.	"I Love New Orleans Music"	Reid, Michael Stewart	3:17
6.	"He Got You"	Ralph Murphy, Bobby Wood	3:31
7.	"Hate the Lies - Love the Liar"	Steve Dorff, Mack David	3:53
8.	"Who's Counting"	Fleming, Morgan	3:29
9.	"You Took Her Off My Hands (Now Take Her Off My Mind)"	Wynn Stewart, Harlan Howard, Skeets McDonald	3:37
10.	"It's Just a Room"	Reid	4:18

== Production ==
- Tom Collins – producer
- Ronnie Milsap – producer
- Les Ladd – engineer, string recording, mixing
- Bill Harris – string recording
- Ben Harris – assistant engineer
- Denny Purcell – mastering
- Hogan Entertainment Design – art direction
- Graham Harrison – photography

== Personnel ==
- Ronnie Milsap – lead vocals, backing vocals, acoustic piano, synthesizers, LinnDrum
- Shane Keister – acoustic piano, Rhodes electric piano, synthesizers
- Richard Ripani – synthesizers
- Jimmy Capps – acoustic guitar
- Dennis Morgan – acoustic guitar
- Jack Watkins – acoustic guitar
- Pete Bordonali – electric guitars, mandolin
- Bruce Dees – electric guitars, backing vocals
- Russ Hicks – pedal steel guitar
- John Hughey – pedal steel guitar
- Warren Gowers – bass
- Alan Kerr – drums
- Larrie Londin – drums
- Buster Phillips – drums
- Farrell Morris – percussion
- Charlie McCoy – vibraphone, harmonica
- The Nashville Horn Works – horns
- Muscle Shoals Horns – horns
- Quitman Dennis – sax solos
- Ronnie Eades – sax solos
- Nashville String Machine – strings
- Bergen White – string arrangements, backing vocals
- Tom Brannon – backing vocals
- Sheri Huffman – backing vocals
- Lisa Silver – backing vocals
- Suzy Storm – backing vocals
- Diane Tidwell – backing vocals
- Marie Tomlinson – backing vocals
- Barbara Wyrick – backing vocals

== Charts ==
=== Weekly charts ===
Chart (1982)	Peak position
US Billboard 200	66
US Top Country Albums (Billboard)	4

=== Year-end charts ===
Chart (1982)	Position
US Top Country Albums (Billboard)	45
