= I Think About Your Lovin' =

Single by The Osmonds

from the album The Osmond Brothers
- B-side: "Working Man's Blues"
- Released: March 1982
- Genre: Country
- Length: 3:00
- Label: Elektra Records 47438
- Songwriter(s): Diana Trask
- Producer(s): Rick Hall

The Osmonds singles chronology
"Steppin' Out" (1979)	"I Think About Your Lovin'" (1982)	"It's Like Falling In Love (Over and Over)" (1982)

"I Think About Your Lovin'" is a song written by Diana Trask and performed by The Osmond Brothers as the lead single of their 1982 self-titled album. It reached #17 on the Billboard country music chart in 1982.

"I Think About Your Lovin'" marked the first and highest-charting country music single for the Osmonds, and the first song to be released since the departure of Donny Osmond from the group and its return to the original four-man lineup. The song was produced by Rick Hall, who returned to work with the band after he had produced their early pop work in 1970 and 1971. Though all four brothers were by this time adults, the song and its associated album were largely recorded under orders from their father George Osmond, who demanded the brothers continue recording music to cover debts the family incurred in the late 1970s and refused to declare bankruptcy despite many of the debts being incurred by unscrupulous business partners and not the family itself.
