= Inside (Ronnie Milsap song) =

Single by Ronnie Milsap

from the album Inside
- B-side: "Carolina Dreams"
- Released: November 1982 (U.S.)
- Recorded: 1982
- Genre: Country, pop
- Length: 4:02
- Label: RCA Victor
- Songwriter: Mike Reid
- Producers: Ronnie Milsap, Tom Collins

Ronnie Milsap singles chronology
"He Got You" (1982)	"Inside" (1982)	"Stranger in My House" (1983)

"Inside" is a song written by Mike Reid, and recorded by American country music singer Ronnie Milsap. It was released in November 1982 as the third single and title track from the album Inside. The song extended his early 1980s success as both a country and crossover artist when it reached its peak popularity in early 1983.

== About the song ==
"Inside" was Milsap's 21st No. 1 hit on the Billboard Hot Country Singles chart, it was the first chart-topper as a songwriter for Country musician Reid. Throughout the 1980s, Milsap recorded several Reid-penned songs which would become No. 1 hits.

Although it never charted on the Billboard Hot 100, the song did enjoy minor success on adult contemporary radio stations, peaking at No. 27 on the Hot Adult Contemporary Singles chart.

=== "Carolina Dreams" ===
The B-side to the "Inside" single was "Carolina Dreams." Written by Kye Fleming and Dennis Morgan (the songwriting duo who had written several past hits for Milsap, and many of Barbara Mandrell's hits), the song never charted on the Hot Country Singles chart as its own single, but remained a B-side "tag-along" throughout the chart run for "Inside."

"Inside"/"Carolina Dreams" was one of several Milsap singles that charted with both A- and B-sides listed.

== Charts ==
=== Weekly charts ===
Chart (1982–1983)	Peak position
Canada RPM Country Tracks	1
Canada RPM Adult Contemporary	6
US Adult Contemporary (Billboard)	27
US Hot Country Songs (Billboard)	1

=== Year-end charts ===
Chart (1983)	Position
US Hot Country Songs (Billboard)	35
