= Loving Up a Storm (Razzy Bailey song) =

Single by Razzy Bailey

from the album Razzy
- B-side: "What's a Little Love Between Friends"
- Released: August 1980
- Genre: Country
- Length: 2:59
- Label: RCA
- Songwriter(s): Johnny Slate, Danny Morrison
- Producer(s): Bob Montgomery

Razzy Bailey singles chronology
"Too Old to Play Cowboy" (1980)	"Loving Up a Storm" (1980)	"I Keep Coming Back" (1980)

"Loving Up a Storm" is a song written by Johnny Slate and Danny Morrison, and recorded by American country music artist Razzy Bailey. It was released in August 1980 as the third single from the album Razzy. The song was Bailey's seventh country hit and the first of his five number ones. "Loving up a Storm" went to number one for one week and spent a total of ten weeks on the country chart.

== Charts ==
Chart (1980)	Peak position
US Hot Country Songs (Billboard)	1
Canadian RPM Country Tracks	10
