= A Love Song (Lee Greenwood song) =

Single by Kenny Rogers

from the album Love Will Turn You Around
- B-side: "Fool in Me"
- Released: October 4, 1982
- Genre: Country
- Length: 3:17
- Label: Liberty
- Songwriter(s): Lee Greenwood
- Producer(s): Kenny Rogers

Kenny Rogers singles chronology
"Love Will Turn You Around" (1982)	"A Love Song" (1982)	"We've Got Tonight" (1983)

"A Love Song" is a song written and recorded by American country music singer Lee Greenwood on his 1982 album Inside Out. In October 1982, a version by American singer Kenny Rogers was released as the second single from his album Love Will Turn You Around. Rogers' version reached number 3 on the Billboard Hot Country Singles chart and number 1 on the RPM Country Tracks chart in Canada.

== Chart performance ==
Chart (1982–1983)	Peak position
US Hot Country Songs (Billboard)	3
US Billboard Hot 100	47
US Adult Contemporary (Billboard)	10
Canadian RPM Country Tracks	1
Canadian RPM Adult Contemporary Tracks	7
