= ...In Black & White =

In Black & White

Studio album by Barbara Mandrell
- Released: April 30, 1982
- Recorded: Nashville, TN (January 1982)
- Genre: Country pop
- Length: 34:30
- Label: MCA
- Producer: Tom Collins

Barbara Mandrell chronology
Barbara Mandrell Live (1981)	In Black & White (1982)	He Set My Life to Music (1982)

Singles from ...In Black & White
- 1. "'Till You're Gone" Released: April 12, 1982; 2. "Operator, Long Distance Please" Released: August 16, 1982

Professional ratings
Review scores
Source	Rating
AllMusic	3/5 stars

...In Black & White is the eleventh solo studio album by American country music artist Barbara Mandrell. The album was released in April 1982 on MCA Records and was produced by Tom Collins. It was Barbara Mandrell's first studio album in two years since the release of Love Is Fair.

== Background and content ==
...In Black & White was recorded in January 1982 in Nashville, Tennessee, and consisted of 10 tracks of new material. Greg Adams of AllMusic compared the fourth track, "Till You're Gone" to Ronnie Milsap's number-one country single "Lost in the Fifties Tonight (In the Still of the Night)", saying that the track anticipated the "oily nostalgia...with its classic doo wop chord progression." The album mainly contained country pop-influenced ballads such as "Till You're Gone". Adams gave the album three out five stars, calling the album "uneven" in parts. He stated, "The album is marred by synthetic production and uneven material, particularly with regard to the preponderance of generic ballads that aren't rooted in any particular genre of music. Unless you're a completist, enjoy "Till You're Gone" on a greatest-hits collection and skip the rest."

...In Black & White was released on an LP album, with five songs on each side of the record.

== Release ==
...In Black & White spawned two singles during the course of 1982. The lead single "'Till You're Gone" was released in April 1982 and peaked at number one on the Billboard Hot Country Songs chart, while also reaching number 25 on Billboard's Hot Adult Contemporary Tracks chart. "'Till You're Gone" peaked also at number three on the Canadian RPM country chart. The second and final single "Operator, Long Distance Please" was released in August 1982 and reached number 9 on Billboard's country singles chart and on Canada's RPM Country Tracks chart. The album was issued in 1982 and reached number seven on the Billboard Top Country Albums chart and #153 on the Billboard 200 albums chart.

== Track listing ==
Side One
No.	Title	Writer(s)	Length
1.	"Operator, Long Distance Please"	Dennis Morgan, Kye Fleming	3:36
2.	"You're Not Supposed to Be Here"	Kent Robbins	2:51
3.	"Rolling Stone"	Don Pfrimmer, Gary Harrison	3:38
4.	"Till You're Gone"	Tom Brasfield, Walt Aldridge	2:57
5.	"Some Things Never Change"	Morgan, Fleming	3:43

Side Two
No.	Title	Writer(s)	Length
1.	"Black and White" (with Gene Miller)	Morgan, Fleming	3:38
2.	"Gettin' Over a Man"	Clydene Jackson, Morgan Ames	3:19
3.	"Dreams Don't Lie"	Morgan, Fleming	3:41
4.	"Why Am I Still in Love"	Harrison, Gene Miller, Robbins	2:43
5.	"The Thrill Is Gone"	Lew Brown, Ray Henderson	4:24

== Personnel ==
- Acoustic Guitar: Jimmy Capps, Fred Tackett
- Background Vocals: Steve Brantley, Bruce Dees, Marcia Routh, Susan Storm, Marie Tomlinson, Barbara Wyrick
- Bass Guitar: Mike Leech, Joe Osborn, Neil Stubenhaus, Bob Wray
- Drums: Mike Baird, Buster Phillips
- Duet Vocals: Gene Miller on "Black and White"
- Electric guitar: Pete Bordonali, Bruce Dees, B.B. King (track 10), Fred Newell, Marty Walsh
- Harmonica: Charlie McCoy
- Lead Vocals: Barbara Mandrell
- Organ: Bobby Ogdin
- Piano: David Briggs, Shane Keister, Bobby Ogdin
- Saxophone: Ron Eades
- Strings: The Nashville String Machine, The Sheldon Kurland Strings
- String Arranger: D. Bergen White
- Synthesizer: Shane Keister
- Vibraphone: Charlie McCoy

== Charts ==
=== Weekly charts ===
Chart (1982)	Peak position
US Billboard 200	153
US Top Country Albums (Billboard)	7

=== Year-end charts ===
Chart (1982)	Position
US Top Country Albums (Billboard)	48

=== Singles ===
Year	Song	Chart positions		
Year	Song	US Country	US AC	CAN Country
1982	"'Till You're Gone"	1	25	3
1982	"Operator, Long Distance Please"	9	—	9
"—" denotes releases that did not chart.
