= I Keep Coming Back (Razzy Bailey song) =

Single by Razzy Bailey

from the album Razzy
- Released: November 1980
- Genre: Country
- Length: 3:54
- Label: RCA
- Songwriters: Jim Hurt; Larry Keith; Johnny Slate
- Producer: Bob Montgomery

Razzy Bailey singles chronology
| "Loving Up a Storm" (1980) | "I Keep Coming Back" (1980) | "Friends" (1981) |

"I Keep Coming Back" is a song written by Jim Hurt, Johnny Slate and Larry Keith, and recorded by American country music artist Razzy Bailey. It was released in November 1980 as the fourth single from the album Razzy. The song was Bailey's second number one on the country chart and was released as a double A-side with "True Life Country Music", with both sides spending one week at number 1.

== Charts ==
| Chart (1980–1981) | Peak position |
|---|---|
| US Hot Country Songs (Billboard) | 1 |
| Canadian RPM Country Tracks | 3 |
