= Friends (Razzy Bailey song) =

Single by Razzy Bailey

from the album Makin' Friends
- B-side: "Anywhere There's a Jukebox"
- Released: March 1981
- Genre: Country
- Length: 3:24
- Label: RCA
- Songwriter(s): Danny Morrison; Johnny Slate
- Producer(s): Bob Montgomery

Razzy Bailey singles chronology
"I Keep Coming Back" (1980)	"Friends" (1981)	"Midnight Hauler" (1981)

"Friends" is a song written by Johnny Slate and Danny Morrison, and recorded by American country music artist Razzy Bailey. It was released in March 1981 as the first single and partial title track from his album Makin' Friends. "Friends" was released as a double-sided single, with "Anywhere There's a Jukebox" on the b-side. Both sides of the single peaked at Number One on the Hot Country Songs charts dated for June 6, 1981.

== Charts ==
Chart (1981)	Peak position
US Hot Country Songs (Billboard)	1
Canadian RPM Country Tracks	9
