= Midnight Hauler =

Single by Razzy Bailey

from the album Makin' Friends
- B-side: "Scratch My Back (And Whisper in My Ear)"
- Released: June 1981
- Genre: Country
- Length: 3:11
- Label: RCA
- Songwriter(s): Wood Newton; Tim DuBois
- Producer(s): Bob Montgomery

Razzy Bailey singles chronology
"Friends" (1981)	"Midnight Hauler" (1981)	"She Left Love All Over Me" (1981)

"Midnight Hauler" is a song written by Wood Newton and Tim DuBois, and recorded by American country music artist Razzy Bailey. It was released in June 1981 as the second single from the album Makin' Friends. The song was Bailey's fourth number one on the country chart. The single went to number one for one week and spent a total of twelve weeks on the country chart.

One of many country songs that salute the American truck driver, "Midnight Hauler" was part of a double A-sided single, paired with "Scratch My Back (And Whisper in My Ear)." "Scratch My Back ..." peaked at No. 8 on the Hot Country Singles chart in September 1981, before "Midnight Hauler" became the more-played song on country radio.

== Charts ==
Chart (1981)	Peak position
US Hot Country Songs (Billboard)	1
Canadian RPM Country Tracks	1
