= Operator, Long Distance Please =

Single by Barbara Mandrell

from the album ...In Black and White
- B-side: "Black and White"
- Released: August 30, 1982
- Genre: Country
- Length: 3:30
- Label: MCA
- Songwriter(s): Kye Fleming, Dennis Morgan
- Producer(s): Tom Collins

Barbara Mandrell singles chronology
| "Till You're Gone" (1982) | "Operator, Long Distance Please" (1982) | "In Times Like These" (1983) |

"'Operator, Long Distance Please" is a song written by Kye Fleming and Dennis Morgan, and recorded by American country music artist Barbara Mandrell. It was released in August 1982 as the second and final single from the album ...In Black and White. It peaked at number 9 on the U.S. Billboard Hot Country Singles chart and number 9 on the Canadian RPM Country Tracks chart.

== Chart performance ==
| Chart (1982) | Peak position |
|---|---|
| US Hot Country Songs (Billboard) | 9 |
| Canadian RPM Country Tracks | 9 |
