= Southern Comfort (Conway Twitty album) =

Studio album by Conway Twitty
- Released: February 1982
- Recorded: 1981
- Genre: Country
- Length: 32:04
- Label: Elektra Records
- Producer: Conway Twitty, Jimmy Bowen

Conway Twitty chronology
Number Ones (1981)	Southern Comfort (1982)	Conway's #1 Classics, Volume One (1982)

Singles from Southern Comfort
- 1. "The Clown" Released: December 1981; 2. "Slow Hand" Released: April 24, 1982

Southern Comfort is the forty-fourth studio album by American country music singer Conway Twitty. The album was released in February 1982, by Elektra Records. Twitty had signed with the label after a long tenure with MCA Records and one of its predecessors, Decca Records; the change in allegiance was owed to a change in management in MCA which also shifted its focus to marketing and promoting newer artists.

This album spawned two #1 country hits. One was in an original song called "The Clown" and the other was in a rendition of the Pointer Sisters' 1981 hit "Slow Hand", which he reworked to suit his personality. The latter single, his 29th #1 country hit, was his final multi-week #1 hit on Billboard's country single charts.

== Track listing ==
No.	Title	Writer(s)	Length
1.	"Slow Hand"	John Bettis, Michael Clark	2:55
2.	"The Clown"	Brenda Barnett, Charlie Chalmers, Sandra Chalmers, Wayne Carson	4:00
3.	"The Boy Next Door"	Eddie Setser, Troy Seals	2:35
4.	"Love and Only Love"	Hugh Moffatt	2:54
5.	"When Love Was Something Else"	Roger Murrah, Scott Anders	2:37
6.	"She Only Meant to Use Him"	Charles Quillen, Dallas Cody	3:55
7.	"It Turns Me Inside Out"	Jan Crutchfield	3:23
8.	"Southern Comfort"	Jamie O'Hara	2:36
9.	"Something Strange Got Into Her Last Night"	Bobby Harden	3:42
10.	"I Was the First"	Terry Skinner	3:14
Total length:			32:04

== Personnel ==
- Acoustic Guitar – Kenny Bell
- Acoustic Guitar, Lead Guitar – Brent Rowan
- Arranged By (strings) – Bergen White
- Art Direction – Norm Ung
- Backing Vocals – Dennis W. Wilson, Don Gant, Doug Clements, Duane West, James E. "Buzz" Cason, Lea Jane Berinati, Vicki Hampton, Yvonne Hodges
- Banjo – Jack Hicks
- Bass – Bob Wray
- Design – Kosh
- Drums, Percussion – James Stroud, Jerry Carrigan
- Engineer – Ron Treat
- Keyboards – Randy McCormick
- Lead Guitar – Reggie Young
- Lead Vocals – Conway Twitty
- Mastered By – Glenn Meadows
- Photography By – Jim Shea
- Producer – Conway Twitty
- Producer, Recorded By – Jimmy Bowen
- Steel Guitar, Dobro – John Hughey
- Strings – Sheldon Kurland Strings

== Charts ==
Chart (1982)	Peak position
US Top Country Albums (Billboard)	5
