= Love's Gonna Fall Here Tonight =

Single by Razzy Bailey

from the album A Little More Razz
- B-side: "Singin' Other People's Songs"
- Released: August 21, 1982
- Genre: Country
- Length: 2:28
- Label: RCA
- Songwriter(s): Kendal Franceschi
- Producer(s): Bob Montgomery

Razzy Bailey singles chronology
"Everytime You Cross My Mind (You Break My Heart)" (1982)	"Love's Gonna Fall Here Tonight" (1982)	"Poor Boy" (1982)

"Love's Gonna Fall Here Tonight" is a song written by Kendal Franceschi, and recorded by American country music artist Razzy Bailey. It was released in August 1982 as the first single from the album A Little More Razz. The song reached number 8 on the Billboard Hot Country Singles & Tracks chart.

== Chart performance ==
Chart (1982)	Peak position
US Hot Country Songs (Billboard)	8
Canadian RPM Country Tracks	11
