= Mountain Music (Alabama album) =

1982 album by Alabama

Studio album by Alabama
- Released: February 25, 1982; October 25, 1990 (re-release)
- Recorded: 1981
- Studios: The Music Mill, Nashville, TN
- Genres: Country, country rock
- Length: 39:21
- Label: RCA Nashville
- Producers: Alabama; Harold Shedd

Alabama chronology
Feels So Right (1981)	Mountain Music (1982)	The Closer You Get... (1983)

Singles from Mountain Music
- 1. "Mountain Music" Released: January 22, 1982; 2. "Take Me Down" Released: May 6, 1982; 3. "Close Enough to Perfect" Released: August 20, 1982

Alternative cover
- Alternative cover art for streaming services

Professional ratings
Review scores
Source	Rating
Allmusic	4.5/5 stars
Rolling Stone	2/5 stars

Mountain Music is the sixth studio album by American country music group Alabama, released in 1982. A crossover success, it ranked well as an album on both country and pop charts and launched singles that were successful in several markets. This is Alabama's most successful studio album. In 1998, the album was certified 5× Platinum by the Recording Industry Association of America. It peaked at No. 1 on the Billboard Country Albums chart and No.14 on the Billboard 200.

== Track listing ==
No.	Title	Writer(s)	Lead singer	Length
1.	"Mountain Music"	Randy Owen	Randy Owen, Jeff Cook, Teddy Gentry	4:12
2.	"Close Enough to Perfect"	Carl Chambers	Randy Owen	3:34
3.	"Words at Twenty Paces"	Hugh Moffatt	Randy Owen	3:54
4.	"Changes Comin' On"	Buddy Cannon, Jimmy Darrell, Dean Dillon	Randy Owen	6:51
5.	"Green River"	John Fogerty	Jeff Cook	2:51
6.	"Take Me Down"	Mark Gray, J.P. Pennington	Randy Owen	4:53
7.	"You Turn Me On"	Teddy Gentry, Owen	Randy Owen	3:11
8.	"Never Be One"	Gentry	Teddy Gentry	2:46
9.	"Lovin' You Is Killin' Me"	Cook	Jeff Cook	3:00
10.	"Gonna Have a Party"	Bruce Channel, Cliff Cochran, Kieran Kane	Randy Owen, Jeff Cook, Teddy Gentry	4:09

Note: The BMGSP reissue of this album replaces the full versions of "Mountain Music" and "Take Me Down" with their single edits.

== Personnel ==
=== Alabama ===
- Jeff Cook - vocals, lead guitar, and fiddle, lead vocals on "Green River" and "Lovin' You Is Killin' Me"
- Teddy Gentry - vocals and bass guitar, lead vocals on "Never Be One"
- Mark Herndon - drums and percussion
- Randy Owen - lead vocals and rhythm guitar

Owen, Cook and Gentry share lead vocals on "Gonna Have a Party" and one verse of "Mountain Music"

=== Additional musicians ===
- Hayward Bishop - drums
- Mark Casstevens - background vocals, guitar
- Michael Douchette - harmonica
- Jack Eubanks - guitar
- David Hanner - guitar
- David Humphreys - drums
- George Leo Jackson - guitar
- Jerry Kroon - drums
- Rodger Morris - keyboards, Synclavier II, Emulator, Prophet-5
- Fred Newell - guitar
- Larry Paxton - bass guitar
- William Rainsford - keyboards
- Dale Sellers - guitar
- W. David Smith - bass guitar
- Bruce Watkins - banjo

String arrangements by Kristin Wilkinson

== Production ==
- Paul Goldberg - engineer
- Randy Kling - mastering
- David Lebon - photography
- Gene Rice - engineer
- Norman Seeff - photography
- Harold Shedd - producer, engineer

== Chart performance ==
=== Album ===
Mountain Music charted No. 1 on Billboard's Country Albums chart in 1982 and reached No. 14 on the all-genre Billboard 200 chart the same year. It won 1982's Grammy Award for "Best Country Performance by a Duo or Group with Vocals".

Chart (1982)	Peak position
U.S. Billboard Top Country Albums	1
U.S. Billboard 200	14
Canadian RPM Top Albums	38

Year End Chart (1982)	Peak position
U.S. Billboard Top Country Albums	3
U.S. Billboard 200	30

Year End Chart (1983)	Peak position
U.S. Billboard Top Country Albums	1
U.S. Billboard 200	19

=== Singles ===
The album produced three hit singles, with the title song "Mountain Music" reaching No. 1 on the Billboard Hot Country Singles chart. The other two singles were successful in several markets: "Take Me Down", a No. 1 country hit, reached No. 18 on the Billboard Hot 100 and No. 5 on the Billboard Adult Contemporary Singles chart. "Close Enough to Perfect" charted No. 1 on the Hot Country Singles and No. 65 on the Billboard Hot 100.

Year	Single	Peak chart positions				
Year	Single	US Country	US	US AC	CAN Country	CAN AC
1982	"Mountain Music"	1	101	—	1	1
1982	"Take Me Down"	1	18	5	1	1
1982	"Close Enough to Perfect"	1	65	—	1	—

=== Certifications ===
Region	Certification	Certified units/sales
United States (RIAA)	5× Platinum	5,000,000^{^}
^{^} Shipments figures based on certification alone.
