= Charley Sings Everybody's Choice =

Studio album by Charley Pride
- Released: March 1982
- Recorded: 1981–82
- Studios: Music City Music Hall (Nashville, Tennessee)
- Genre: Country
- Label: RCA Victor
- Producer: Norro Wilson

Charley Pride chronology
Greatest Hits (1981)	Charley Sings Everybody's Choice (1982)	Charley Pride Live (1982)

Singles from Charley Sings Everybody's Choice
- 1. "Mountain of Love" Released: November 1981; 2. "I Don't Think She's in Love Anymore" Released: March 1982; 3. "You're So Good When You're Bad" Released: July 1982

Charley Sings Everybody's Choice is the twenty-ninth studio album by American country music artist Charley Pride. It was released in March 1982 on RCA Victor and was produced by Norro Wilson. The album included three singles, all of which became major hits on the country charts: "Mountain of Love," "I Don't Think She's in Love Anymore" and "You're So Good When You're Bad." The album itself would also reach chart positions on multiple surveys following its original release.

== Background and content ==
On Charley Sings Everybody's Choice, Nashville producer Norro Wilson teamed up with Charley Pride for the first time. The album would shift Pride's sound into a more modern country pop style. Pride had previously recorded with Jerry Bradley, who was behind most of his previous albums and hit singles in the mid 1970s. Everybody's Choice was recorded at Music City Music Hall, a studio located in Nashville, Tennessee. The album was recorded in two sessions in November 1981 and January 1982. With the exception of one track produced by Jerry Bradley, all of the tracks were produced by Norro Wilson. The project contained ten tracks. Included was a cover of pop hit "Mountain of Love," which Pride would eventually release as a single. The remaining nine songs were new recordings composed by Nashville songwriters, such as John Schweers, Larry Henley and Ben Peters.

== Release and reception ==
Professional ratings
Review scores
Source	Rating
Allmusic	4.5/5 stars

Charley Sings Everybody's Choice was released in March 1982 on RCA Victor Records. It would be Pride's twenty ninth studio release in his music career. The album was originally distributed as a vinyl LP, containing five songs on each side of the record. It would later be re-released in a digital format to sites such as Apple Music. It spent a total of 24 weeks on the Billboard Top Country Albums chart and peaked at number ten on the list in June 1982. It was also his first studio album to reach a peak position on the Australian Kent Music Report chart, reaching number 95. Everybody's Choice received a 4.5 star rating from Allmusic's Tom Roland who commented, "Dumb title, but it's an excellent album. Producer Norro Wilson revitalized Pride's career by bringing out the Memphis soul that rests in the shadows of his country veneer."

Charley Pride Sings Everybody's Choice included three singles which all became major hits. Its first single to become a hit was Pride's cover of "Mountain of Love" which was released in November 1981. After 18 weeks on the Billboard country chart, it topped the survey by March 1982. "I Don't Think She's in Love Anymore" was then spawned as the album's second single in March 1982. It peaked at number two on the Billboard country list in June of that year. Its final single release was "You're So Good When You're Bad," which was issued in July 1982. The song became the album's third number one Billboard single by November 1982. In Canada, the album's first two singles became number one hits on the RPM country chart. "You're So Good When You're Bad" would peak at number two.

== Track listing ==
=== Vinyl version ===
Side one
No.	Title	Writer(s)	Length
1.	"I Don't Think She's in Love Anymore"	Kent Robbins	2:36
2.	"I See the Devil in Your Deep Blue Eyes"	Dorsey Burnette; Larry Henley; Larry Keith	3:06
3.	"You're So Good When You're Bad"	Ben Peters	3:16
4.	"When She Dances"	Brian Blugerman	3:03
5.	"Mountain of Love"	Harold Dorman	2:46

Side two
No.	Title	Writer(s)	Length
1.	"Oh What a Beautiful Love Song"	Allen Henson; Keith Palmer	2:43
2.	"I Haven't Loved This Way in Years"	Bill Shore; David Wills	2:52
3.	"Cup of Love"	Peters	2:55
4.	"Love Is a Shadow"	John Schweers	2:58
5.	"I Hope You Never Cry Again"	Tom Collins	2:46

=== Digital version ===
Charley Sings Everybody's Choice
No.	Title	Writer(s)	Length
1.	"I Don't Think She's in Love Anymore"	Robbins	2:39
2.	"I See the Devil in Your Deep Blue Eyes"	Burnette; Henley; Keith	3:07
3.	"You're So Good When You're Bad"	Peters	3:27
4.	"When She Dances"	Blugerman	3:02
5.	"Mountain of Love"	Dorman	2:47
6.	"Oh What a Beautiful Love Song"	Henson; Palmer	2:46
7.	"I Haven't Loved This Way in Years"	Shore; Wills	2:52
8.	"Cup of Love"	Peters	3:04
9.	"Love Is a Shadow"	Schweers	2:57
10.	"I Hope You Never Cry Again"	Collins	2:46

== Personnel ==
All credits are adapted from the liner notes of Charley Sings Everybody's Choice.

Musical and technical personnel

- Herb Burnette – art direction
- Jerry Bradley – producer (track five only)
- The Cherry Sisters – background vocals
- Randy Kling – mastering
- The Nashville Edition – background vocals
- Charley Pride – lead vocals, producer (track five only)
- Pinwheel Studios – art direction
- Nick Sangiamo – photography
- Norro Wilson – producer

== Chart performance ==
Chart (1982)	Peak position
Australia Top Albums (Kent Music Report)	95
US Top Country Albums (Billboard)	19

== Release history ==
Region	Date	Format	Label	Ref.
Australia	March 1982	Vinyl	RCA Victor Records	
Canada	March 1982	Vinyl	RCA Victor Records	
South Africa	March 1982	Vinyl	RCA Victor Records	
United States	March 1982	Vinyl	RCA Victor Records	
United States	2010s	Digital download; streaming	Sony Music Entertainment	
