= Love Will Turn You Around =

Studio album by Kenny Rogers
- Released: 1982
- Recorded: 1982
- Studios: Creative Workshop, Nashville; Lion Share, Los Angeles; Record One, Los Angeles
- Genre: Country
- Length: 32:00
- Label: Liberty
- Producers: Kenny Rogers, David Malloy, Brent Maher, Randy Goodrum, Val Garay

Kenny Rogers chronology
Christmas (1981)	Love Will Turn You Around (1982)	We've Got Tonight (1983)

Singles from Love Will Turn You Around
- 1. "Love Will Turn You Around" Released: June 28, 1982; 2. "A Love Song" Released: October 4, 1982

Love Will Turn You Around is the thirteenth studio album by American singer Kenny Rogers, released in 1982.

The title cut was the debut single and charted well, reaching #1 on the U.S. and Canadian country charts and adult contemporary charts, and #13 on the Hot 100 chart. The other single, "A Love Song", didn't fare as well, only reaching #47 on the Billboard Hot 100. It was, however, #1 in Canada and #3 on the U.S. Country chart.

The album peaked at #34 on the Billboard 200 charts. The album has been certified Platinum in both the U.S. and Canada.

== Track listing ==
No.	Title	Writer(s)	Length
1.	"Love Will Turn You Around"	Kenny Rogers, David Malloy, Even Stevens, Thom Schuyler	3:40
2.	"A Love Song"	Lee Greenwood	3:17
3.	"Fightin' Fire with Fire"	Bobby Harden	2:33
4.	"Maybe You Should Know"	Peter McCann	2:39
5.	"Somewhere Between Lovers and Friends"	Brent Maher, Randy Goodrum	2:55
6.	"Take This Heart"	J. P. Pennington	3:24
7.	"If You Can Lie a Little Bit"	Bob Stone	3:36
8.	"I'll Take Care of You"	JD Souther	2:39
9.	"The Fool in Me"	Dave Loggins, Randy Goodrum	4:07
10.	"I Want a Son"	Steve Dorff, Marty Panzer	3:09

== Personnel ==
- Kenny Rogers – lead vocals, backing vocals (3), vocal arrangements, rhythm arrangements
- Randy McCormick – keyboards (1)
- Joel Scott – Fender Rhodes (2)
- John Hobbs – acoustic piano (3), organ (7), organ solo (7)
- Clarence McDonald – Fender Rhodes (4, 9, 10)
- Billy Preston – organ (4)
- Lincoln Mayorga – acoustic piano (4, 10)
- Randy Goodrum – keyboards (5), rhythm arrangements (5)
- Shane Keister – keyboards (5)
- Eugene Golden – acoustic piano (6)
- Steve Goldstein – acoustic piano (8)
- Billy Joe Walker Jr. – guitar (1), acoustic guitar (2, 9), mandolin (2)
- Fred Tackett – acoustic guitar (2, 4, 10), guitar (3, 9), electric guitar (7)
- Paul Jackson Jr. – electric guitar (4, 6, 7, 9, 10)
- Larry Byrom – guitar (5)
- Jon Goin – guitar (5)
- Randy Dorman – guitar (6)
- Richie Zito – electric guitar (7), guitar solo (7)
- Waddy Wachtel – acoustic guitar (8)
- Josh Leo – electric guitar (8)
- Joe Chemay – bass (1, 7, 9), backing vocals (6, 7)
- Nathan East – bass (2, 4, 10)
- Emory Gordy Jr. – bass (3)
- Jack Williams – bass (5)
- Chuck Jacobs – bass (6)
- Bryan Garofalo – bass (8)
- Paul Leim – percussion (1), drums (2, 3, 7, 9)
- Leon "Ndugu" Chancler – drums (2, 4, 10)
- Kenny Malone – drums (5), percussion (5)
- Bobby Daniels – drums (6)
- Craig Krampf – drums (8)
- Ress Williams – cowbell (7)
- Gary Herbig – flute solo (6)
- Tommy Morgan – harmonica (8)
- Joel Peskin – tenor saxophone (9), tenor sax solo (9)
- Gene Page – rhythm arrangements, string arrangements
- Brent Maher – rhythm arrangements (5)
- Jimmie Haskell – string arrangements
- Larry Cansler – string arrangements
- Mike Post – string arrangements
- Murray Adler – concertmaster
- Sid Sharp – concertmaster
- Kin Vassy – backing vocals (1, 3, 4, 7, 10), guitar (3)
- Terry Williams – backing vocals (1, 3, 4, 6, 7, 10)
- Herb Pedersen – backing vocals (2, 9)
- Joey Scarbury – backing vocals (2, 9)
- Cindy Fee – backing vocals (3, 4, 6, 10)
- Donna McElroy – backing vocals (5)
- Vicki Hampton – backing vocals (5)
- Don Henley – backing vocals (6)
- Kenny Williams – backing vocals (10)

== Production ==
- Producers – Kenny Rogers (Tracks 1–4, 6, 7, 9 & 10); David Malloy (Track 1); Brent Maher (Track 5); Randy Goodrum (Track 5); Val Garay (Track 8).
- Production Assistant – Brenda Harvey Richie
- Engineers – Bob Bullock, Reggie Dozier, Val Garay, Brent Maher and Al Schmitt.
- Second Engineers – Niko Bolas, Bob Bullock, Larry Ferguson, Tom Fouce and Stephen Schmitt.
- Recorded at Creative Workshop (Nashville, TN); Lion Share Recording Studios and Record One (Los Angeles, CA).
- Mixing – Bob Bullock, Reggie Dozier, Kenny Rogers and Al Schmitt.
- Mixed at Lion Share Recording Studios
- Mastered by Bernie Grundman at A&M Studios (Hollywood, CA).
- Art Direction – Bill Burks
- Illustration – Richard Amsel
- Photography – Gary Register

== Charts ==
Chart (1982)	Peak position
Australian Albums (Kent Music Report)	84
Canada Top Albums/CDs (RPM)	23
Norwegian Albums (VG-lista)	12
US Billboard 200	34
US Top Country Albums (Billboard)	5

== Certifications ==
Region	Certification	Certified units/sales
Canada (Music Canada)	Platinum	100,000^{^}
United States (RIAA)	Platinum	1,000,000^{^}
^{^} Shipments figures based on certification alone.
