= Tie Your Dream to Mine =

Single by Marty Robbins

from the album Come Back to Me
- B-side: "That's All She Wrote"
- Released: October 2, 1982
- Genre: Country
- Length: 2:52
- Label: Columbia
- Songwriter(s): Van Stephenson; Tim DuBois; Jeff Silbar; Sam Lorber
- Producer(s): Bob Montgomery

Marty Robbins singles chronology
"Some Memories Just Won't Die" (1982)	"Tie Your Dream to Mine" (1982)	"Honkytonk Man" (1982)

"Tie Your Dream to Mine" is a song recorded by American country music artist Marty Robbins. It was released in October 1982 as the second single from the album Come Back to Me. The song reached #24 on the Billboard Hot Country Singles & Tracks chart. The song was written by Van Stephenson, Tim DuBois, Jeff Silbar and Sam Lorber.

== Chart performance ==
Chart (1982)	Peak position
US Hot Country Songs (Billboard)	24
Canadian RPM Country Tracks	17
