= Sure Feels Like Love =

Single by Larry Gatlin & the Gatlin Brothers

from the album Sure Feels Like Love
- B-side: "Home Is Where the Healin' Is"
- Released: August 1982
- Genre: Country
- Length: 3:22
- Label: Columbia
- Songwriter(s): Larry Gatlin
- Producer(s): Larry Gatlin, Jerry Crutchfield

Larry Gatlin & the Gatlin Brothers singles chronology
"She Used to Sing on Sunday" (1982)	"Sure Feels Like Love" (1982)	"Almost Called Her Baby by Mistake" (1983)

"Sure Feels Like Love" is a song written by Larry Gatlin, and recorded by American country music group Larry Gatlin & the Gatlin Brothers. It was released in August 1982 as the first single and title track from their album Sure Feels Like Love. The song reached number 5 on the Billboard Hot Country Singles chart and number 1 on the RPM Country Tracks chart in Canada.

== Chart performance ==
Chart (1982)	Peak position
U.S. Billboard Hot Country Singles	5
Canadian RPM Country Tracks	1
