= The Clown (Conway Twitty song) =

1981 single by Conway Twitty

Single by Conway Twitty

from the album Southern Comfort
- B-side: "The Boy Next Door"
- Released: December 1981
- Genre: Country
- Length: 4:01
- Label: Elektra
- Songwriter(s): Wayne Carson; Brenda Barnett; Charlie Chalmers; Sandra Rhodes
- Producer(s): Conway Twitty, Jimmy Bowen

Conway Twitty singles chronology
"Red Neckin' Love Makin' Night" (1981)	"The Clown" (1981)	"Slow Hand" (1982)

"The Clown" is a song written by Wayne Carson, Brenda Barnett, Charlie Chalmers and Sandra Rhodes, and recorded by American country music artist Conway Twitty. It was released in December 1981 as the first single from the album Southern Comfort. The song was Twitty's 28th number one hit on the country chart. The single went to number one for one week and spent a total of 13 weeks on the country chart.

== Charts ==
=== Weekly charts ===
Chart (1981–1982)	Peak position
US Hot Country Songs (Billboard)	1
Canadian RPM Country Tracks	7

=== Year-end charts ===
Chart (1982)	Position
US Hot Country Songs (Billboard)	17
