= Slow Hand =

1981 single by The Pointer Sisters

Single by The Pointer Sisters

from the album Black & White
- B-side: "Holdin' Out for Love"
- Released: May 1981
- Genre: Soul; R&B
- Length: 3:53
- Label: Planet
- Songwriters: Michael Clark; John Bettis
- Producer: Richard Perry

The Pointer Sisters singles chronology
"Where Did the Time Go" (1980)	"Slow Hand" (1981)	"What a Surprise" (1981)

Music video
- "Slow Hand" by the Pointer Sisters on YouTube

"Slow Hand" is a song recorded by American vocal group the Pointer Sisters for their eighth studio album Black & White (1981). The song, written by Michael Clark and John Bettis, was released by the Planet label in May 1981 as the lead single from Black & White.

== Background and impact ==
Although its sultry style recalls the Pointer Sisters' first American top-ten hit, the 1978 number two hit "Fire", "Slow Hand" was not written for the group; in fact John Bettis stated that "the Pointer Sisters were the furthest [act] from [the composers'] minds." However producer Richard Perry said he "knew 'Slow Hand' [would be] an instant smash [hit]...that...would recapitulate and expand on the intimacy [of] 'Fire'." Like "Fire"—which also featured Anita Pointer on lead—"Slow Hand" peaked at number two on the Billboard Hot 100 for three weeks behind "Endless Love" by Diana Ross and Lionel Richie. "Slow Hand" reached that position in August 1981 when it also reached number seven on the Hot R&B/Hip-Hop Songs chart. In September 1981, the single was certified Gold by the RIAA. "Slow Hand" also afforded the Pointer Sisters international success, including the first appearance by the group in the top-ten on the UK Singles Chart.

== Personnel ==
The Pointer Sisters

- Anita Pointer – lead vocals
- June Pointer – backing vocals
- Ruth Pointer – backing vocals

Musicians

- John Barnes – electric piano
- William "Smitty" Smith – organ
- Paul Jackson Jr. – guitar
- Tim May – guitar
- Nathan Watts – bass
- John Robinson – drums
- Paulinho da Costa – percussion

== Charts ==
=== Weekly charts ===
Chart (1981)	Peak position
Australia (Kent Music Report)	5
Canada Top Singles (RPM)	2
France (SNEP)	55
Ireland (Irish Singles Chart)	2
Netherlands (Dutch Top 40)	33
New Zealand (Recorded Music NZ)	6
South Africa (Springbok Radio)	10
UK Singles (Official Charts Company)	10
US Billboard Hot 100	2
US Adult Contemporary (Billboard)	6
US Hot R&B/Hip-Hop Songs (Billboard)	7
US Cash Box Top 100	2

=== Year-end charts ===
Chart (1981)	Rank
Australia (Kent Music Report)	28
Canada Top Singles (RPM)	68
New Zealand (Recorded Music NZ)	20
UK Singles (Official Charts Company)	100
US Billboard Hot 100	19
US Cash Box Top 100	5

== Certifications ==
Region	Certification	Certified units/sales
New Zealand (RMNZ)	Platinum	30,000^{‡}
^{‡} Sales+streaming figures based on certification alone.

== Del Reeves version ==
The song was covered in 1981 by country singer Del Reeves, whose version peaked at #53 on the Hot Country Singles chart.

== Conway Twitty version ==
"Slow Hand"

Single by Conway Twitty

from the album Southern Comfort
- B-side: "When Love Was Something Else"
- Released: April 24, 1982
- Genre: Country
- Length: 2:56
- Label: Elektra
- Songwriters: Michael Clark, John Bettis
- Producers: Jimmy Bowen, Conway Twitty

Conway Twitty singles chronology
"The Clown" (1981)	"Slow Hand" (1982)	"Over Thirty (Not Over the Hill)" (1982)

The song was covered in April 1982 by country singer Conway Twitty with minor lyric changes to accommodate a male singer. His version, on Elektra Records, topped the Billboard Hot Country Singles chart for two weeks that June, and was his last multi-week number-one song, and his last gold record.

=== Weekly charts ===
Chart (1982)	Peak position
US Hot Country Songs (Billboard)	1
Canadian RPM Country Tracks	6

=== Year-end charts ===
Chart (1982)	Position
US Hot Country Songs (Billboard)	20

=== Certifications ===
Region	Certification	Certified units/sales
United States (RIAA)	Platinum	1,000,000^{‡}
^{‡} Sales+streaming figures based on certification alone.
