= Tears of the Lonely =

Single by Mickey Gilley

from the album You Don't Know Me
- B-side: "Ladies Night"
- Released: February 1982
- Genre: Country
- Length: 3:16
- Label: Epic
- Songwriter(s): Wayland Holyfield
- Producer(s): Jim Ed Norman

Mickey Gilley singles chronology
"Lonely Nights" (1981)	"Tears of the Lonely" (1982)	"Put Your Dreams Away" (1982)

"Tears of the Lonely" is a song written by Wayland Holyfield, and originally recorded by Don Williams on his 1978 album Expressions. The song was later recorded by American country music artist Mickey Gilley and released in February 1982 as the third single from his album You Don't Know Me. The song reached #3 on the Billboard Hot Country Singles chart and #1 on the RPM Country Tracks chart in Canada.

== Charts ==
=== Weekly charts ===
Chart (1982)	Peak position
US Hot Country Songs (Billboard)	3
Canadian RPM Country Tracks	1

=== Year-end charts ===
Chart (1982)	Position
US Hot Country Songs (Billboard)	34
