= I Don't Think She's in Love Anymore =

Single by Charley Pride

from the album Charley Sings Everybody's Choice
- B-side: "Oh What a Beautiful Love Song"
- Released: March 1982
- Genre: Country
- Length: 2:33
- Label: RCA
- Songwriter(s): Kent Robbins
- Producer(s): Norro Wilson

Charley Pride singles chronology
"Mountain of Love" (1981)	"I Don't Think She's in Love Anymore" (1982)	"You're So Good When You're Bad" (1982)

"I Don't Think She's in Love Anymore" is a song written by Kent Robbins, and recorded by American country music artist Charley Pride. It was released in March 1982 as the third single from his album Charley Sings Everybody's Choice. The song reached number 2 on the Billboard Hot Country Singles chart and number 1 on the RPM Country Tracks chart in Canada.

== Content ==
The song is about a young man who, after years of partying and womanizing, and coming in at all hours of the night and early morning, finally runs out of second chances.

The protagonist explains that, after another night on the town, he had his alibi well-rehearsed to charm his girlfriend only to find himself locked out of the house. After trying to unlock the front door with a key that had no longer fit, he finds a note on the door written by his girlfriend, saying, "Adios, sayonara, goodbye, this is it." He then realizes that it was his years of lies that caused the relationship to end and that the only thing she wants is for him to go away once and for all. Determined to seek forgiveness and "turn over a brand new leaf", he goes to a payphone to tearfully plead his case, but once the girl realizes who is on the phone, she hangs up on him.

== Charts ==
=== Weekly charts ===
Chart (1982)	Peak position
US Hot Country Songs (Billboard)	2
Canadian RPM Country Tracks	1

=== Year-end charts ===
Chart (1982)	Position
US Hot Country Songs (Billboard)	31
