= You're So Good When You're Bad =

Single by Charley Pride

from the album Charley Sings Everybody's Choice
- B-side: "I Haven't Loved This Way in Years"
- Released: July 1982
- Genre: Country
- Length: 3:28
- Label: RCA
- Songwriter(s): Ben Peters
- Producer(s): Norro Wilson

Charley Pride singles chronology
"I Don't Think She's in Love Anymore" (1982)	"You're So Good When You're Bad" (1982)	"Why Baby Why" (1982)

"You're So Good When You're Bad" is a song written by Ben Peters, and recorded by American country music artist Charley Pride. It was released in July 1982 as the fourth single from the album Charley Sings Everybody's Choice. The song was Pride's twenty-seventh number one single on the country chart. The single went to number one for one week and spent a total of twelve weeks on the country chart.

== Charts ==
Chart (1982)	Peak position
US Hot Country Songs (Billboard)	1
Canadian RPM Country Tracks	2
