= Till You're Gone =

Single by Barbara Mandrell

from the album ...In Black and White
- B-side: "You're Not Supposed to Be Here"
- Released: April 8, 1982
- Genre: Country
- Length: 2:57
- Label: MCA
- Songwriter(s): Walt Aldridge; Tom Brasfield
- Producer(s): Tom Collins

Barbara Mandrell singles chronology
"Wish You Were Here" (1981)	"Till You're Gone" (1982)	"Operator, Long Distance Please" (1982)

"Till You're Gone" is a song written by Walt Aldridge and Tom Brasfield, and recorded by American country music artist Barbara Mandrell. It was released in April 1982 as the first single from the album ...In Black and White. The song was Mandrell's fifth number one on the country chart. The single went to number one for one week and spent a total of 14 weeks on the country top 40 chart.

== Charts ==
=== Weekly charts ===
Chart (1982)	Peak position
US Adult Contemporary (Billboard)	25
US Hot Country Songs (Billboard)	1
Canadian RPM Country Tracks	3
Canadian RPM Adult Contemporary Tracks	20

=== Year-end charts ===
Chart (1982)	Position
US Hot Country Songs (Billboard)	11
