= Some Memories Just Won't Die =

Single by Marty Robbins

from the album Come Back to Me
- B-side: "Lover Lover"
- Released: April 6, 1982
- Genre: Country
- Length: 3:20
- Label: Columbia
- Songwriter(s): Bobby Lee Springfield
- Producer(s): Bob Montgomery

Marty Robbins singles chronology
"Teardrops in My Heart" (1981)	"Some Memories Just Won't Die" (1982)	"Tie Your Dream to Mine" (1982)

"Some Memories Just Won't Die" is a song written by Bobby Lee Springfield, and recorded by American country music artist Marty Robbins. It was released in April 1982 as the first single from his album Come Back to Me. The song reached #10 on the Billboard Hot Country Singles chart and #1 on the RPM Country Tracks chart in Canada. On June 6, 1983, at the 17th annual Music City News Country Awards in Nashville, the song was named "Single of the Year" for 1982, giving Robbins a posthumous honor.

== Chart performance ==
Chart (1982)	Peak position
US Hot Country Songs (Billboard)	10
Canadian RPM Country Tracks	1
