= The Best of Willie Nelson (1982 album) =

Compilation album by Willie Nelson
- Released: 1982
- Genre: Country
- Label: Capitol

Willie Nelson chronology
Everybody's Talkin' (1981)	The Best of Willie Nelson (1982)	20 of the Best (1982)

The Best of Willie Nelson is a 1982 compilation album by country singer Willie Nelson.

== Track listing ==
1. Funny How Time Slips Away
2. Hello Walls
3. The Part Where I Cry
4. Undo the Right
5. Wake Me When It's Over
6. Crazy
7. Touch Me
8. One Step Beyond
9. Three Days
10. Half a Man
11. Where My House Lives
12. Mr. Record Man
13. Darkness on the Face of the Earth

== Personnel ==
- Willie Nelson - Guitar, vocals

== Chart performance ==
Chart performance for The Best of Willie Nelson
Chart (1982)	Peak position
US Top Country Albums (Billboard)	62
