= Ralph Murphy (musician) =

- Born: 1944; Saffron Walden, England
- Origin: Ontario, Canada
- Died: 28 May 2019 (aged 75) Nashville, Tennessee
- Genres: Country
- Occupations: Musician, record producer, songwriter
- Instrument: Guitar
- Years active: 1958–2019
- Label: Pye
- Website: www.murphyslawsofsongwriting.com

Ralph Murphy (1944 – 28 May 2019) was a British-born Canadian musician, record producer, and songwriter. Murphy was inducted into the Canadian Country Music Hall of Fame in 2012.

== Biography ==
=== Early life and career ===
Murphy was born in Saffron Walden, England during World War II. At the age of six, Murphy emigrated to Canada with his mother. An avid lover of music, Murphy taught himself to play guitar and began playing gigs in Wallaceburg, Ontario at the age of 14. At 17 he moved between Los Angeles and New York City making his way in the music business.

At 19, Murphy moved to London, signed a record deal with Pye Records and released two singles with Jack Klaysen as The Guardsmen. The Guardsmen then changed their name to the Slade Brothers and released an additional two singles. The Slade Brothers opened for famous headlining acts, such as The Kinks, The Troggs, Martha and the Vandellas, The Byrds, and The Walker Brothers.

Ralph was also a member of a band called Smokey Circles who he formed with Shmuel Kraus, who had previously worked together in The High Windows. Their album was released in 1970.

=== Producing career ===
Murphy signed his first publishing deal with Mills Music in 1965. He had his first big hit with James Royal's "Call My Name" in 1966. Murphy started producing records in 1966 for CBS, Fontana, Carnaby, Decca, Other hits included Billy Fury's "Beyond a Shadow of a Doubt" and the Casuals "Touched". In 1967, Murphy joined the group Harper and Rowe. The following year, he became Raffi Murphy in the group The High Windows.

In 1969, Murphy moved to New York City and produced albums for several groups, including, but not limited to, April Wine, Mashmakhan, Shooter, Brutus, Sea Dog, Chris Bartley, and the Rock Garden.

=== Songwriting ===
In 1971, Murphy had a number two country hit with Jeannie C. Riley titled "Good Enough to be Your Wife" which gave Murphy his first introduction to Nashville. In 1978, Murphy moved to Nashville and began a joint venture publishing/production company with Roger Cook called PICALIC. The company achieved its first number one hit within a year with a song by Crystal Gayle called "Talking in Your Sleep", written by Bobby Wood and Roger Cook. In 1978, Murphy cowrote "Half the Way" with Bobby Wood, which was recorded by Crystal Gayle and became a number one hit. In 1980 Murphy co-wrote "He Got You" with Bobby Wood, which was recorded by Ronnie Milsap and also became a number one hit. Murphys' most recent success as "21st Century Christmas", co-written with Paul Brady and recorded by Cliff Richard which made it to number 2 on the UK charts. Other artists that have recorded Murphy's songs include Randy Travis, Ray Price, Don Williams, Kathy Mattea, Little Texas, Shania Twain, Brotherhood of Man, Jimmy Buffett, Vanity Fair, and many more.

Murphy worked with ASCAP for the over 14 years to facilitate workshops for songwriters, and help protect songwriters rights. He and his son Shawn Murphy co-wrote the noted book, Murphy's Laws of Songwriting, which Murphy posted to his website to help aspiring writers obtain success in their own careers, and recently released an album of his previously recorded hits and also several of his own favorite previously unrecorded songs.

=== Other affiliations ===
Murphy was a member of the Country Music Association, serving on the board of the Canadian Country Music Association. He was a member of the Songwriters Association of Canada and the Songwriter's Guild of America. He was a president of the Nashville Songwriter's Association, and a President of the Nashville Chapter of the National Academy of the Recording Arts and Sciences and Trustee of NARAS.

In 1987 Murphy was scheduled to play a songwriters showcase at Nashville's famous Bluebird Cafe. A talent spotter for EMI-owned Capitol Records was there to see his set. Due to illness Murphy was unable to make the show, so a fellow performer also on the showcase was moved up the running list and took the stage in his spot. That musician was Garth Brooks who was offered a record deal by Capitol as a result.

=== Awards ===
- 2011 Jo Walker-Meador International Achievement Award
- 2012 Canadian Country Music Hall of Fame
- 2019 SOCAN Special Achievement Award
- 2019 Ralph Murphy Songwriters Inspiration Award
- 2019 NSAI Mentors Award

=== Death ===
On 28 May 2019, Murphy died of pneumonia. He was 75.
