= He Got You =

Single by Ronnie Milsap

from the album Inside
- B-side: "I Love New Orleans Music"
- Released: August 7, 1982
- Genre: Country
- Length: 3:31
- Label: RCA Victor
- Songwriters: Ralph Murphy; Bobby Wood
- Producers: Tom Collins; Ronnie Milsap

Ronnie Milsap singles chronology
"Any Day Now" (1982)	"He Got You" (1982)	"Inside" (1982)

"He Got You" is a song written by Ralph Murphy and Bobby Wood, recorded by American country music artist Ronnie Milsap. It was released in August 1982 as the second single from the album Inside.

== Song history ==
"He Got You" was Ronnie Milsap's 32nd single release and his 20th No.1 hit on the country charts. It was a major hit on the Adult Contemporary charts as well, peaking at number 15. It also had minor success on the pop charts, stopping at No. 59. The song is one of Milsap's most popular recordings and still receives reasonable airplay to this day.

== Charts ==
Chart (1982)	Peak position
US Hot Country Songs (Billboard)	1
Canadian RPM Country Tracks	2
