= She Left Love All Over Me =

Single by Razzy Bailey

from the album Feelin' Alright
- B-side: "Blaze of Glory"
- Released: December 1981
- Recorded: 1981
- Genre: Country, pop
- Length: 3:17
- Label: RCA
- Songwriter(s): Chester Lester
- Producer(s): Bob Montgomery

Razzy Bailey singles chronology
"Midnight Hauler"/"Scratch My Back (And Whisper in My Ear)" (1981)	"She Left Love All Over Me" (1981)	"Everytime You Cross My Mind (You Break My Heart)" (1982)

"She Left Love All Over Me" is a song written by Chester Lester, and recorded by American country music artist Razzy Bailey. It was released in December 1981 as the first single from the album Feelin' Alright. The song reached No. 1 on the Billboard magazine Hot Country Singles chart. The song was Bailey's fifth (and final) No. 1 song in a string that dated back to 1980's "Lovin' Up a Storm"; Bailey's streak includes several double-sided hits where the flip side had its own peak.

== Charts ==
=== Weekly charts ===
Chart (1981–1982)	Peak position
US Hot Country Songs (Billboard)	1
Canadian RPM Country Tracks	2

=== Year-end charts ===
Chart (1982)	Position
US Hot Country Songs (Billboard)	10
