= Lonely Nights =

Single by Mickey Gilley

from the album You Don't Know Me
- B-side: "We've Watched Another Evening Waste Away"
- Released: September 1981
- Recorded: 1981
- Genre: Country
- Length: 3:23
- Label: Epic
- Songwriter(s): Stewart Harris and Keith Stegall
- Producer(s): Jim Ed Norman

Mickey Gilley singles chronology
"You Don't Know Me" (1981)	"Lonely Nights" (1981)	"Tears of the Lonely" (1982)

"Lonely Nights" is a song written by Keith Stegall and Stewart Harris, and recorded by American country music artist Mickey Gilley. It was released in September 1981 as the second single from the album You Don't Know Me. The song was Gilley's thirteenth number one country hit. The single stayed at number one for one week and stayed a total of thirteen weeks on the country chart.

== Charts ==
=== Weekly charts ===
Chart (1981–1982)	Peak position
US Hot Country Songs (Billboard)	1
Canadian RPM Country Tracks	1

=== Year-end charts ===
Chart (1982)	Position
US Hot Country Songs (Billboard)	30
