= Mountain of Love =

1960 single by Harold Dorman

- Side A variant of the original US single

Single by Harold Dorman
- B-side: "To Be with You"
- Released: February 1960
- Recorded: 1959
- Studio: Royal Studios, Memphis
- Genre: Rock and roll
- Length: 2:30
- Label: Rita
- Songwriter: Harold Dorman
- Producer: Roland Janes

Harold Dorman singles chronology
"Mountain of Love" (1960)	"River of Tears" (1960)

"Mountain of Love" is a song written by Harold Dorman. Dorman released his version as a single in 1960. It was originally recorded in late 1959 at the Royal Recording Studios in Memphis before the backing vocals (and strings, much later) were overdubbed. It performed well, spending nineteen weeks on the Billboard Hot 100 chart, peaking at No. 21 in May 1960, while reaching No. 7 on the Billboard Hot R&B Sides chart, and No. 25 on Canada's "CHUM Hit Parade". The song was his only Top 40 hit on the Billboard Hot 100 and was the highest-charting single of his career.

== Charley Pride version ==
"Mountain of Love"

Single by Charley Pride

from the album Charley Sings Everybody's Choice
- B-side: "Love Is a Shadow"
- Released: 1981
- Genre: Country-soul, gospel
- Length: 2:46
- Label: RCA
- Songwriter: Harold Dorman
- Producer: Norro Wilson

Charley Pride singles chronology
"Never Been So Loved (In All My Life)" (1981)	"Mountain of Love" (1981)	"I Don't Think She's in Love Anymore" (1982)

In December 1981, Charley Pride released a cover version, which topped the Billboard Hot Country Singles chart in March 1982. Charley Pride's version of "Mountain of Love" was his twenty-sixth No. 1 on the country chart.

=== Charts ===
==== Weekly charts ====
Chart (1981–1982)	Peak position
Australia (Kent Music Report)	76
Canadian RPM Country Tracks	1
New Zealand Singles Chart	41
US Hot Country Songs (Billboard)	1

==== Year-end charts ====
Chart (1982)	Position
US Hot Country Songs (Billboard)	38

== Other cover versions ==
- In 1960, Kenny Lynch released a cover of the song, which reached No. 33 on Record Retailer chart in the UK.
- In 1964, Johnny Rivers released his remake using members of the Wrecking Crew as a single. It reached No. 9 on the Billboard Hot 100. It later appeared on his debut album In Action! In Canada it reached No. 4 on the RPM charts.
- The Beach Boys recorded an acoustic rendition of the song for their 1965 album Beach Boys' Party! Music critic Richie Unterberger describes it as "a rousing run through" and one of the highlights of the album.
- In 1968, singer Ronnie Dove had a minor hit when he released his version as the B-side of "Never Gonna Cry (The Way I'll Cry Tonight)" on Diamond Records. Ronnie Dove's version spent six weeks on the Billboard Hot 100, and reached No. 67. In Canada it reached No. 51 on the RPM charts and No. 13 on the CHUM charts. This recording featured A-list session musicians, such as Boots Randolph on saxophone and Glen Campbell on guitar. It was originally issued as an album track on Ronnie Dove Sings the Hits for You two years earlier, and was the original B-side of this single.
- Jerry Lawson and Talk of the Town (on their 2007 album, Jerry Lawson & Talk of the Town). Bobby G. Rice took a rendition to No. 20 on the country music charts in 1971.
- A cover by Molly & the Heymakers peaked at No. 79 on the RPM Country Tracks chart in Canada in 1992.
