= Close Enough to Perfect =

Single by Alabama

from the album Mountain Music
- B-side: "Fantasy"
- Released: August 20, 1982 (U.S.)
- Recorded: 1981
- Genre: Country
- Length: 3:33
- Label: RCA Nashville 13294
- Songwriter: Carl Chambers
- Producers: Harold Shedd and Alabama

Alabama singles chronology
"Take Me Down" (1982)	"Close Enough to Perfect" (1982)	"Christmas in Dixie" (1982)

"Close Enough to Perfect" is a song written by Carl Chambers, and recorded by American country music band Alabama. It was released in August 1982, as the third single from Alabama's album Mountain Music.

"Close Enough to Perfect" was Alabama's eighth No. 1 song in the fall of 1982.

Song Backstory

According to Chambers, the title came about during a day of installing strips of wood on the Bellamy Brothers bus. “I’d pick one and she (his then-wife Nancy) would find something wrong with it.” This would happen several times until he, exhausted with frustration, would look at her and say “It’s close enough to perfect for me!” He then stopped what he was doing to go write that down because he “thought it would make a good title for a song someday”.

The rest of the song.

During this time, he was on the road with the Bellamy Brothers. One afternoon in Indiana, he was in his hotel room where he would pick up his guitar and wind up writing the song out of frustration over the way his new wife (Nancy) was being treated back home.

== Charts ==
Chart (1982)	Peak position
US Hot Country Songs (Billboard)	1
US Billboard Hot 100	65
Canadian RPM Country Tracks	1
