= Put Your Dreams Away =

Single by Mickey Gilley

from the album Put Your Dreams Away
- B-side: "If I Can Hold Her on the Outside"
- Released: June 1982
- Genre: Country
- Length: 3:19
- Label: Epic
- Songwriter(s): Richard Leigh; Wayland Holyfield
- Producer(s): Jim Ed Norman

Mickey Gilley singles chronology
"Tears of the Lonely" (1982)	"Put Your Dreams Away" (1982)	"Talk to Me" (1982)

"Put Your Dreams Away" is a song written by Richard Leigh and Wayland Holyfield, and performed by American country music artist Mickey Gilley. It was released in June 1982 as the first single and title track from the album Put Your Dreams Away. The song was Gilley's fourteenth number one on the country chart. The single stayed at number one for one week and spent a total of twelve weeks on the country chart.

== Chart performance ==
Chart (1982)	Peak position
US Hot Country Songs (Billboard)	1
Canadian RPM Country Tracks	1
