= Mountain Music (song) =

Single by Alabama

from the album Mountain Music
- B-side: "Never Be One"
- Released: January 22, 1982 (U.S.)
- Recorded: 1981
- Genre: Country, bluegrass
- Length: 3:39 (single edit); 4:12 (album version)
- Label: RCA Nashville 13019
- Songwriter: Randy Owen
- Producers: Harold Shedd and Alabama

Alabama singles chronology
"Love in the First Degree" (1981)	"Mountain Music" (1982)	"Take Me Down" (1982)

Audio
- "Mountain Music" on YouTube

Music video
- "Mountain Music" on YouTube

"Mountain Music" is a song recorded by American country music band Alabama, written by lead singer Randy Owen. It was released in January 1982 as the lead-off single and title track to Alabama's album Mountain Music.

== About the song ==
"Mountain Music" — a song melding the Southern rock and bluegrass genres — has variously been described by country music writers as "a modern country classic" and a song that "practically defined what country groups have strived to accomplish."

According to Randy Owen's book Born Country, "Mountain Music" took him three years to write. He wanted to put his childhood experiences into a song.

The song references chert rocks, which according to the band is one song lyric that is commonly misheard.

=== Vocals ===
"Mountain Music" is one of the few Alabama songs where solo vocals can prominently be heard from band members Teddy Gentry and Jeff Cook (in the song's third verse, where lead singer Owen trades off lead vocals with his bandmates).

Brad Paisley's 2011 single "Old Alabama" incorporates the bridge from "Mountain Music", again sung by Owen, Gentry and Cook.

== Single and album edits ==
The single edit to "Mountain Music", released for retail sale and radio airplay, cuts the following from the album version:

- The introduction, in which an old mountain philosopher speaks about someday climbing a mountain. This Walter Brennan impression was done by Bob Martin, a guitar handler and roadie with the band. It refers to a song Brennan recorded called "Old Rivers", which repeats the line "... one of these days I'm gonna climb that mountain..." A harmonica solo can also be heard at the very beginning.
- A series of guitar riffs slowly builds in tempo from slow to very fast. This is nestled between the third refrain and the fast-tempoed fiddle-heavy musical bridge before the finalé.

== Cover versions ==
Country music duo Montgomery Gentry covered the song from the television special George Strait: ACM Artist of the Decade All Star Concert.

== Critical reception ==
In 2024, Rolling Stone ranked the song #61 on its 200 Greatest Country Songs of All Time.

== Charts ==
Released in January 1982, "Mountain Music" became Alabama's sixth No. 1 song on Billboard magazine's Hot Country Singles chart the same week the Academy of Country Music named the group the Top Vocal Group and Entertainer of the Year.

To date, "Mountain Music" remains one of the group's most popular songs.

=== Weekly charts ===
Chart (1982)	Peak position
US Hot Country Songs (Billboard)	1
US Bubbling Under Hot 100 (Billboard)	1
Canadian RPM Country Tracks	1
Canadian RPM Adult Contemporary Tracks	1

=== Year-end charts ===
Chart (1982)	Position
US Hot Country Songs (Billboard)	24

== Certifications ==
Certifications for Mountain Music
Region	Certification	Certified units/sales
United States (RIAA)	Platinum	1,000,000^{‡}
^{‡} Sales+streaming figures based on certification alone.
