= Take Me Down =

1982 single by Alabama

Single by Exile

from the album Don't Leave Me This Way
- B-side: "It Takes Love to Make Love"
- Released: August 1980
- Recorded: 1980
- Genre: Pop rock
- Length: 3:30
- Label: Warner Bros.
- Songwriters: J.P. Pennington; Mark Gray
- Producer: Peter Coleman

Exile singles chronology
"You're Good for Me" (1980)	"Take Me Down" (1980)	"Heart & Soul" (1981)

Music video
- "Take Me Down" on YouTube

"Take Me Down"

Single by Alabama

from the album Mountain Music
- B-side: "Lovin' You Is Killin' Me"
- Released: May 6, 1982 (U.S.)
- Recorded: 1981
- Genre: Country rock
- Length: 3:43 (single edit); 4:53 (album version)
- Label: RCA Nashville 13210
- Songwriters: Mark Gray, J.P. Pennington
- Producers: Harold Shedd and Alabama

Alabama singles chronology
"Mountain Music" (1982)	"Take Me Down" (1982)	"Close Enough to Perfect" (1982)

"Take Me Down" is a song recorded by American country music band Alabama. It was released in May 1982 as the second single from Alabama's album Mountain Music.

Written by Exile band members Mark Gray and J.P. Pennington, the song was originally recorded by Exile in 1980. The Exile version was released as a single, but failed to become a major hit, although it reached number 102 on the US Bubbling Under chart and number 11 in South Africa.

However, it was not until Alabama released the song that it was the group's seventh number one on the country chart. In addition to its success on the country charts, the song fared modestly well on pop radio, reaching No. 18 on the Billboard Hot 100.

== Single and album edits ==
The single edit to "Take Me Down," released for retail sale and radio airplay, is about 1:10 shorter than the full-length album version. Excised from the single version:

- The second refrain; the song immediately proceeds from the second verse into the bridge.
- An earlier fade during the ending harmony part (about 30 seconds earlier than the album version).

=== "B" side ===
The B-side to "Take Me Down" is a song titled "Lovin' You Is Killin' Me," a re-recording of one of Alabama's earliest songs. "Lovin' You Is Killin' Me" originally appeared as the B-side to the band's first charted single, 1977's "I Wanna Be With You Tonight."

== Charts ==
=== Exile ===
Chart (1980)	Peak position
South Africa (Springbok)	11
US Billboard Bubbling Under the Hot 100	102

=== Alabama ===
Chart (1982)	Peak position
Canada RPM Country Tracks	1
Canada RPM Adult Contemporary Tracks	1
US Billboard Hot 100	18
US Adult Contemporary (Billboard)	5
US Hot Country Songs (Billboard)	1

=== Year-end charts ===
Chart (1982)	Position
US Adult Contemporary (Billboard)	18
US Hot Country Songs (Billboard)	32

== Cover version ==
The song was covered in by soul singer Johnny Bristol the same year and released as the first single off his Free to Be Me album.
