= Love Will Turn You Around (song) =

Single by Kenny Rogers

from the album Love Will Turn You Around and Six Pack
- B-side: "I Want a Son"
- Released: June 28, 1982
- Genre: Country
- Length: 3:40
- Label: Liberty
- Songwriter(s): Kenny Rogers, David Malloy, Thom Schuyler, Even Stevens
- Producer(s): Kenny Rogers, David Malloy

Kenny Rogers singles chronology
"Through the Years" (1981)	"Love Will Turn You Around" (1982)	"A Love Song" (1982)

"Love Will Turn You Around" is a song by American country music singer Kenny Rogers. It was released in June 1982 as the first single and title track from Rogers' album of the same name. It is also the theme song to Rogers' 1982 film Six Pack. Rogers wrote the song with Thom Schuyler, David Malloy and Even Stevens.

The song was nominated for a Grammy Award for Best Male Country Vocal Performance. On the Billboard Hot 100 singles chart, the song reached No. 13, while reaching No. 1 on both the country and adult contemporary charts.

== Critical reception ==
Kip Kirby, of Billboard magazine reviewed the song favorably, saying that Rogers "creates a sound similar to his First Edition work, with high-strung acoustic guitars backing a quick, unstrained vocal." He goes on to say that the song is notable for its "sharp metaphors on human relationships."

== Charts ==
=== Weekly charts ===
Chart (1982)	Peak position
Australian (Kent Music Report)	96
US Billboard Hot 100	13
US Adult Contemporary (Billboard)	1
US Hot Country Songs (Billboard)	1
Canadian RPM Country Tracks	1
Canadian RPM Top Singles	12
Canadian RPM Adult Contemporary	1

=== Year-end charts ===
Chart (1982)	Position
US Billboard Hot 100	72
US Adult Contemporary (Billboard)	9
US Hot Country Songs (Billboard)	18

== See also ==
- List of number-one adult contemporary singles of 1982 (U.S.)
