= Any Day Now (Burt Bacharach song) =

1962 song written by Burt Bacharach and Bob Hilliard

"Any Day Now (My Wild Beautiful Bird)"

Single by Chuck Jackson

from the album Any Day Now
- B-side: "The Prophet"
- Written: 1962
- Released: April 1962
- Length: 3:20
- Label: Wand
- Songwriters: Burt Bacharach, Bob Hilliard

Chuck Jackson singles chronology
"What'cha Gonna Say Tomorrow" (1962)	"Any Day Now (My Wild Beautiful Bird)" (1962)	"Come on and Love Me" (1962)

"Any Day Now" is a popular song written by Burt Bacharach and Bob Hilliard in 1962. It has been recorded by numerous artists over the years, including notable versions by Chuck Jackson in 1962, Alan Price in 1965, Elvis Presley in 1969, Scott Walker in 1973 and Ronnie Milsap in 1982. In the lyrics, the singer predicts the imminent demise of a romantic relationship and describes the sadness this will leave.

== Chuck Jackson recording ==
Jackson, an R&B singer born in North Carolina in 1937, recorded the first version of the song to hit the Billboard Hot 100 chart; it reached number 23 in 1962 with the title "Any Day Now (My Wild Beautiful Bird)" and spent six weeks in the Top 40. Jackson's version appeared on his album, which was also titled Any Day Now. The song was Jackson's highest-charting hit on the US pop chart, and also peaked at number two for three weeks on the Hot Black Sides chart.

Jackson's recording of the song was used over the closing credits of the film Inherent Vice.

Jackson's original backing track was recycled by Scepter for the song "Lover", which was recorded in the early 1960s by Scepter artist Tommy Hunt. The track, which featured an entirely new Hilliard lyric and a partially re-written melody, was not released until 1986.

=== Charts ===
Chart (1962)	Peak position
U.S. Billboard Hot 100	23
U.S. Billboard R&B Singles	2
U.S. Cash Box Top 100	12

== Elvis Presley version ==
Presley recorded a cover version of "Any Day Now" on February 20, 1969 at American Sound Studio, Memphis, Tennessee. This version appeared on his album of that year, From Elvis in Memphis. Although not released as a single in its own right, the song appeared as the B-side to Presley's No. 3 US pop hit "In the Ghetto", which appeared on the same album. In 2022 it featured in the Elvis movie soundtrack, the song itself and as a remix mixed with "Suspicious Minds" made by Australian dance music trio PNAU with the name "Don't Fly Away".

== Ronnie Milsap ==
"Any Day Now"

Single by Ronnie Milsap

from the album Inside
- B-side: "It's Just a Room"
- Released: April 1982
- Recorded: 1981
- Genre: Country
- Length: 3:42
- Label: RCA Victor
- Songwriters: Burt Bacharach and Bob Hilliard
- Producers: Tom Collins and Ronnie Milsap

Ronnie Milsap singles chronology
"I Wouldn't Have Missed It for the World" (1981)	"Any Day Now" (1982)	"He Got You" (1982)

Milsap, a popular country / pop singer, recorded the most widely known version of the song. It was the lead single from his 1982 album Inside, and it peaked at No. 14 on the Billboard Hot 100 chart, spending nine weeks in the Top 40. In addition, this version went to No. 1 on both the Billboard Hot Country Singles chart (for one week) as well as the Hot Adult Contemporary Singles chart (for five weeks). It also went to No. 1 on the Canadian Country and Adult Contemporary Chart for three weeks.

Milsap's producer, Tom Collins, encouraged Milsap to make the song sound different from the original by Chuck Jackson. As a result, Milsap recorded it in a different key and sang it softly.

=== Charts ===
==== Weekly charts ====
Chart (1982)	Peak position
Australia (Kent Music Report)	96
US Hot Country Songs (Billboard)	1
US Billboard Hot 100	14
US Adult Contemporary (Billboard)	1
Canadian RPM Country Tracks	1
Canadian RPM Adult Contemporary	1

==== Year-end charts ====
Chart (1982)	Position
U.S. Billboard Hot Country Singles	37
U.S. Billboard Adult Contemporary	1
U.S. Billboard Hot 100	83
U.S. Cashbox Top 100	95

== Other notable versions ==
- Country singer Don Gibson also released a version of "Any Day Now", which reached the Top 40 of the Billboard country music chart in 1979.
- Singer Percy Sledge recorded "Any Day Now" in 1969, and this version reached 35 on the Billboard R&B chart and 86 on the Hot 100.
- Luther Vandross recorded "Any Day Now" for his 2001 self-titled album. The Vandross version was nominated for a 2003 Grammy Award in the category of Best Traditional R&B Vocal Performance.

== Bibliography ==
- Roland, Tom, The Billboard Book of Number One Country Hits Billboard Books, Watson-Guptill Publications, New York, 1991 (ISBN 0-82-307553-2).
- Whitburn, Joel (1996). The Billboard Book of Top 40 Hits, 6th Edition (Billboard Publications)
- Whitburn, Joel, Top Country Songs: 1944-2005, 2006.
- Whitburn, Joel, Top Pop Songs: 1955-2006, 2007.
