= Razzy Bailey =

American country music singer (1939–2021)

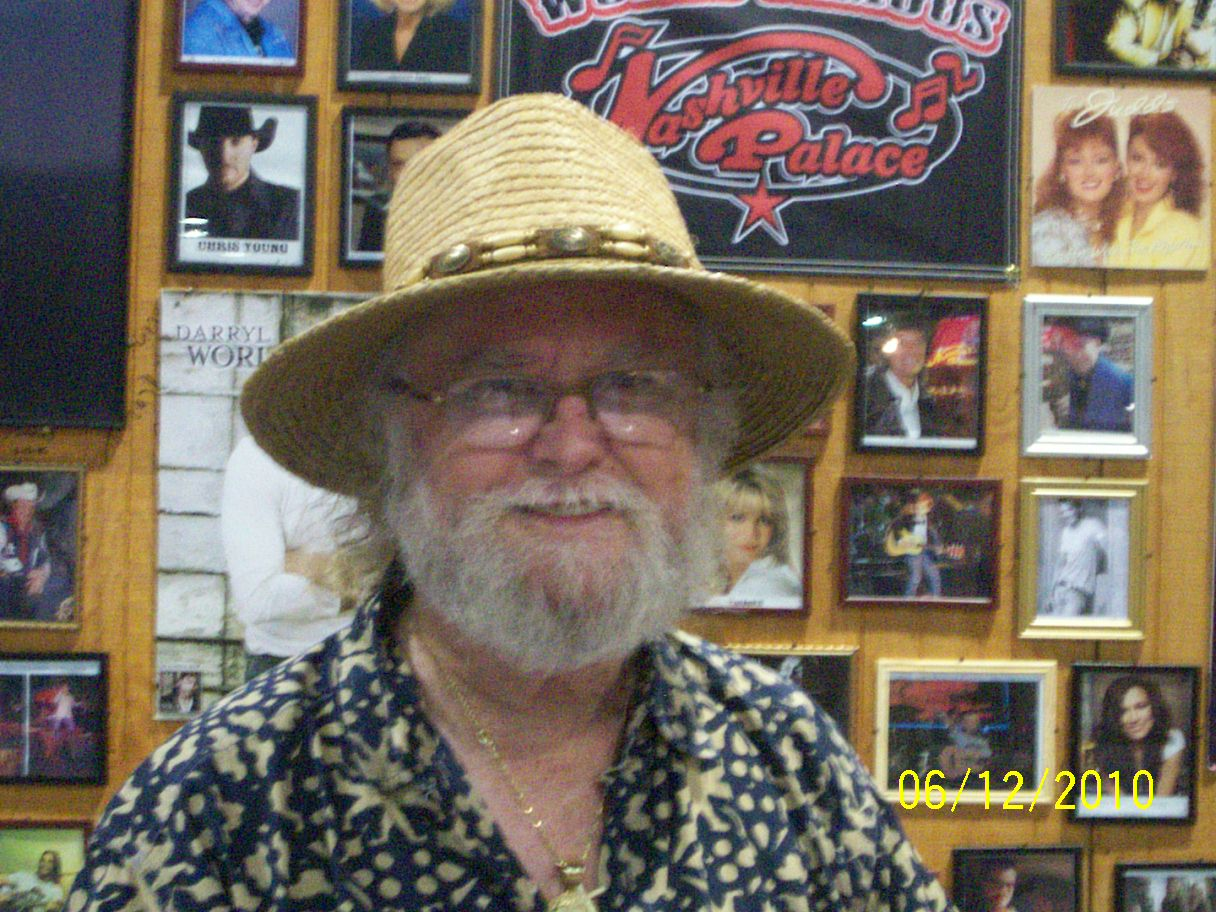
- Bailey at CMA Music Festival in 2010

Background information
- Born: Rasie Michael Bailey; February 14, 1939; Five Points, Alabama, U.S.
- Died: August 4, 2021 (aged 82) Goodlettsville, Tennessee, U.S.
- Genre: Country
- Occupations: Singer, musician, songwriter, and producer
- Years active: 1966–2021
- Labels: Atlantic; MGM; Erastus; RCA; MCA; SOA; Spectra
- Spouse: Faye Bright (m. 1990)
- Website: https://therazzybailey.com/

Rasie Michael Bailey (February 14, 1939 – August 4, 2021), better known as Razzy Bailey, was an American country music singer, songwriter and musician. In the early 1980s, he scored 5 No. 1s on the Billboard country music charts.

== Early life ==
Bailey was born in Five Points, Alabama, United States, and raised on a farm in La Fayette, Alabama. Bailey got his first experience of musical performance as a member of his high school's Future Farmers of America string band. After graduation, he married and had children immediately and had little time to pursue his career, but he spent many years playing occasional gigs at honkytonks in Georgia and Alabama and developing his songwriting.

== Early releases ==
In 1966, Bailey took his material to Bill Lowery at Atlantic Records, who arranged for him to record "9,999,999 Tears" backed by a studio band featuring Billy Joe Royal, Joe South, and Freddy Weller. The song failed to hit the charts at that time, but Bailey was encouraged, forming the pop trio Daily Bread which released a pair of albums on small labels. Another group, The Aquarians, followed in 1972; in 1974, Bailey recorded the album I Hate Hate simply as "Razzy." It sold over half a million copies before being picked up by MGM Records.

== Career at RCA ==
In 1976, Dickey Lee recorded "9,999,999 Tears", and it became a country and pop hit in 1976, and in 1977, Lee repeated this with another Bailey tune, "Peanut Butter," which also went into the charts. As his songwriting talents became known, Bailey signed with RCA Records and, in 1978, began releasing singles of his own songs. His first hit as a singer-songwriter, "What Time Do You Have To Be Back to Heaven?", was on the charts for over four months. Bailey charted a total of seven No. 1 singles on Billboard's "Country" charts and another eight Top 10 in the late 1970s and early 1980s. His sound combines R&B influences with country; his version of Wilson Pickett's "In the Midnight Hour" was a country hit. His last country No. 1 hit was with "She Left Love All Over Me" in 1982.

Bailey had three double sided number 1's in succession on the Country chart, a feat never accomplished by any other artist.

He also operated Razzy's Hit House, his recording studio where he helped other artists with their projects.

== Personal life ==
Politically, Bailey was a member of the Republican Party. Bailey died in August 2021, at the age of 82.

== Discography ==
=== Albums ===
Year	Album	Chart Positions		Label
Year	Album	US Country	US	Label
1974	I Hate Hate			MGM
1979	If Love Had a Face	33		RCA
1980	Razzy	12		RCA
1981	Makin' Friends	8	183	RCA
1982	Feelin' Right	10	176	RCA
1982	A Little More Razz	59		RCA
1983	Greatest Hits	33		RCA
1984	The Midnight Hour	36		RCA
1985	Cut from a Different Stone	38		MCA
1986	Arrival			MCA
2006	Decades of Hits			Spectra
2009	Damned Good Time			SOA

=== Singles ===
Year	Single	Chart Positions		Album
Year	Single	US Country	CAN Country	Album
1966	"9,999,999 Tears"	—	—	Single only
1974	"I Hate Hate" (as Razzy)^{A}	—	—	I Hate Hate
1976	"Keepin' Rosie Proud of Me"	99	—	Single only
1978	"What Time Do You Have to Be Back to Heaven"	9	20	If Love Had a Face
1978	"Tonight She's Gonna Love Me (Like There Was No Tomorrow)"	6	5	If Love Had a Face
1979	"If Love Had a Face"	6	33	If Love Had a Face
1979	"I Ain't Got No Business Doin' Business Today"	10	18	If Love Had a Face
1979	"I Can't Get Enough of You"	5	—	Razzy
1980	"Too Old to Play Cowboy"	13	—	Razzy
1980	"Loving Up a Storm"	1	10	Razzy
1980	"I Keep Coming Back" / "True Life Country Music"	1	3	Razzy
1981	"Friends" / "Anywhere There's a Jukebox"	1	9	Makin' Friends
1981	"Midnight Hauler"	1	1	Makin' Friends
1981	"Scratch My Back (And Whisper in My Ear)"^{B}	8	—	Makin' Friends
1981	"She Left Love All Over Me"	1	2	Feelin' Right
1982	"Everytime You Cross My Mind (You Break My Heart)"	10	9	Feelin' Right
1982	"Love's Gonna Fall Here Tonight"	8	11	A Little More Razz
1982	"Poor Boy"	30	—	A Little More Razz
1983	"After the Great Depression"	19	23	Greatest Hits
1983	"This Is Just the First Day"	62	48	Greatest Hits
1984	"In the Midnight Hour"	14	32	The Midnight Hour
1984	"Knock on Wood"	29	—	Cut from a Different Stone
1984	"Touchy Situation"	43	—	Cut from a Different Stone
1985	"Modern Day Marriages"	51	—	Cut from a Different Stone
1985	"Fightin' Fire with Fire"	78	—	Arrival
1985	"Old Blue Yodeler"	48	—	Arrival
1986	"Rockin' in the Parkin' Lot"	63	42	Arrival
1987	"If Love Ever Made a Fool"	69	—	Singles only
1988	"Unattended Fire"	58	—	Singles only
1988	"Starting All Over Again"	73	—	Singles only
1989	"But You Will"	65	—	Singles only
1991	"Fragile (Handle with Care)"	—	36	Singles only

- ^{A}"I Hate Hate" peaked at No. 67 on the Billboard Hot 100 and No. 50 on the RPM Top Singles chart in Canada.
- ^{B}B-side to "Midnight Hauler."

=== Music videos ===
Year	Video
1980	"Friends"
1981	"Anywhere There's a Jukebox"
1981	"Midnight Hauler"
1981	"I've Had My Limit (Of Two-Timing Women)"
1982	"Night Life"
1985	"Old Blue Yodeler"
