= My Toot Toot (album) =

Studio album by Jean Knight
- Released: 1985
- Genres: Funk, R&B, soul, Synth-pop, Zydeco
- Label: Mirage
- Producer: Isaac Bolden

Jean Knight chronology
Mr. Big Stuff (1971)	My Toot Toot (1985)	Shaki de Boo-Tee (1997)

Professional ratings
Review scores
Source	Rating
AllMusic	3/5 stars

My Toot Toot is Jean Knight's third studio album and her first in four years. The title track was previously a Zydeco hit for Rockin' Sidney. Other cover versions on this album include a rerecorded version of Knight's biggest hit "Mr. Big Stuff" (which contains a rap intro) and Shirley & Lee's hit "Let the Good Times Roll." It would be twelve years before Knight released another studio album, though she did continue touring and making live performances.

== Track listing ==
=== Side One ===
1. "My Toot Toot" - (Sidney Simien) - 4:21
2. "One Monkey Don't Stop the Show" - (Allen Toussaint) - 2:56
3. "Mr. Big Stuff" - (Joseph Broussard, Ralph Williams, Carrol Washington) - 3:01
4. "Let the Good Times Roll" - (Leonard Lee) - 4:05

=== Side Two ===
1. "Working Your Mojo" - (Isaac Bolden, Joseph Broussard) - 4:00
2. "Magic" - (Isaac Bolden, D. Johnson, B. Williams) - 4:08
3. "My Heart Is Willing" - (Isaac Bolden) - 4:35
4. "Isn't Life So Wonderful" - (Isaac Bolden) - 3:28
5. "Funny Bone" - (Walter Moorehead) - 4:07

== Personnel ==
- Produced by: Isaac Bolden for Bolden & Moorehead Productions
- Recorded and mixed at: Sea-Saint Recording Studio, New Orleans, Louisiana
- Recorded by: Bob Kearney and Clarence R. Toussaint
- Mixed by: Bob Kearney
- "One Monkey Don't Stop the Show" mixed by: Clarence R. Toussaint
- Production assistants: B. Williams, D. Johnson
- Photography: David Michael Kennedy
- Art direction: Bob Defrin

Musicians

- Daryl Johnson - keyboards, backing vocals, bass synthesizer
- Isaac Bolden - keyboards
- Brennan A. Williams - Linn drum programming
- Kevin Hayes - keyboards, backing vocals, bass synthesizer
- Jimmy Molière - guitar
- Cynthia Sheeler and Charles Elam III - backing vocals
- Barry Sailor - bass guitar on "Working Your Mojo"
- Donald Provost - harmonica on "Isn't Life So Wonderful"
- Allen Toussaint - all music on "One Monkey Don't Stop the Show"

== Charts ==
Album - Billboard (North America)

Year	Chart	Position
1985	Pop Albums	181

Singles - Billboard (North America)

Year	Single	Chart	Position
1985	"My Toot Toot"	The Billboard Hot 100	50
1985	"My Toot Toot"	Hot R&B/Hip-Hop Singles & Tracks	59
