= Shaki de Boo-Tee =

Studio album by Jean Knight
- Released: March 18, 1997
- Genres: Funk, R&B, soul
- Label: Ichiban
- Producers: Walter Moorehead, Carl Marshall, Isaac Bolden, E.C. Commedore

Jean Knight chronology
My Toot Toot (1985)	Shaki de Boo-Tee (1997)	The Very Best of Me (1997)

Shaki de Boo-Tee is Jean Knight's third studio album and her first in twelve years. All of the tracks were produced and arranged by her long-time friends and collaborators Isaac Bolden, Walter Moorehead and Carl Marshall, while three of them were written by Moorehead. Two of the songs on the album were co-written by Knight's son, E.C. Commedore, while two others are duets that Knight shares with Moorehead. Cover versions include Bill Withers' song "Who Is She (And What Is She to You)." The last two songs are bonus tracks and live versions of her biggest hits "Mr. Big Stuff" and "My Toot Toot."

== Track listing ==
1. "Bus Stop" (Walter Moorehead) - 4:34
2. "Bill" (Jimmy Lewis) - 5:44
3. "Shaki de Boo-Tee" (Walter Moorehead) - 4:11
4. "Rockin' Good Way" (duet with Walter Moorehead) (Clyde Ottis, Brook Benton, Luchi DeJesus) - 4:25
5. "Too Good for My Own Good" (Walter Moorehead) - 4:26
6. "Lover Please" (duet with Walter Moorehead) (Billy Swan) - 4:10
7. "My Sweet Shu Shun" (Brian Splino) - 4:37
8. "Who Is She (And What Is She to You)" (Bill Withers, Stan McKenny) - 5:58
9. "Low Down Shuffle" (E.C. Commedore, Carl Marshall) - 4:31
10. "Don't Break My Heart" (J. Washington, E.C. Commedore) - 3:29
11. "Gonna Getcha Back" (Albert Savoy, J. Harris) - 5:10
12. "That's What Love Will Make You Do" (Milton Campbell) - 4:25
13. "Mr. Big Stuff" Live (Joseph Broussard, Carol Washington, Ralph Williams) - 5:49
14. "My Toot Toot" Live (Sidney Simone) - 7:40

== Album credits ==
- Tracks 1, 3, and 5 produced and arranged by: Walter Moorehead and Carl Marshall
- Track 2 produced and arranged by: Carl Marshall and Isaac Bolden
- Tracks 4, 6, 7, 13, and 14 produced and arranged by: Isaac Bolden
- Tracks 8, 9, 10, 11, and 12 produced by: E.C. Commedore
- Tracks 8 and 9 arranged by: Carl Marshall
- Track 10 arranged by: J. Washington and E.C. Commedore
- Tracks 11 and 12 arranged by: Wardell Quezerque
- Live recording by: Marc Hewitt
- Tracks 1, 2, 3, and 5 recorded and mixed at Sound Services; engineered by: Marc Hewitt
- Tracks 4 and 6 recorded at Sea-Saint Recording, mixed at Sound Services; engineered by: Marc Hewitt
- Track 7 recorded and mixed at Sea-Saint Recording; engineered by: Marc Hewitt
- Tracks 8, 10, and 11 recorded and mixed at Sound Suite Studios; engineered by: Louis Ludwig
- Track 9 recorded and mixed at Giftt Studios; engineered by: Carl Marshall
- Track 12 recorded at Sound Suite Studios; engineered by: Louis Ludwig
- Ms. Knight's vocals recorded at Giftt Studios; engineered by: Carl Marshall
- Art Direction & Design by: Francis P. Dreyer III
