= Lovers, Friends and Strangers =

Studio album by Barbara Mandrell
- Released: May 1, 1977
- Genre: Country
- Length: 29:45
- Label: ABC/Dot Records
- Producer: Tom Collins

Barbara Mandrell chronology
Midnight Angel (1976)	Lovers, Friends and Strangers (1977)	Love's Ups and Downs (1977)

Singles from Lovers, Friends and Strangers
- 1. "Hold Me" Released: August 8, 1977

Professional ratings
Review scores
Source	Rating
AllMusic	3/5 stars

Lovers, Friends and Strangers is the sixth solo studio album by American country music singer, Barbara Mandrell, released in May 1977. The album peaked at number 26 on the Billboard Top Country Albums chart. "Hold Me", the album's only single, peaked at number 12 on the Billboard Hot Country Songs chart.

Mandrell's success was beginning to build with the release of this album. "Married, But Not to Each Other", the second single from her previous album, Midnight Angel, had peaked at number three on the Billboard county singles chart, which lead to its inclusion on Lovers, Friends, and Strangers. A cover version of "After the Lovin'" was included, which exemplified the type of songs Mandrell was recording at the time. This track was also nominated for a Grammy the following year for Best Female Performance – Country. Like many of her following albums, Lovers, Friends, & Strangers consisted of 10 tracks, instead of 11 like on her previous two releases, This Is Barbara Mandrell and Midnight Angel.

== Track listing ==
No.	Title	Writer(s)	Length
1.	"She's Loved Me Out of You"	Dean Dillon, Gary Harrison	2:56
2.	"Married, But Not to Each Other"	Denise LaSalle, Frances Miller	2:56
3.	"This Is Not Another Cheatin' Song 2:47"	Rose Lee Maphis, Joe Maphis	2:47
4.	"How Long Does It Take – 2:49"	Dillon	2:49
5.	"Bedroom Reunion – 3:30"	Dillon, Johnny McCollum	3:30
6.	"Hold Me"	Glenn Ray	2:54
7.	"We Are the One"	Kent Robbins	2:52
8.	"After the Lovin'"	Alan Bernstein, Ritchie Adams	3:27
9.	"Lovers, Friends, and Strangers"	Robbins	2:42
10.	"Let My Man Go, Jesus"	Don Devaney	2:52

== Personnel ==
- Barbara Mandrell - lead vocals
- The Holladay Singers, The Lea Jane Singers - backing vocals
- Bobby Thompson - banjo
- Mike Leech, Steve Schaffer - bass guitar
- Hayward Bishop, Kenny Malone - drums
- Tommy Williams - fiddle
- Jimmy Capps, Steve Gibson, Glenn Keener, Chip Young, Reggie Young - guitar
- Charlie McCoy, Terry McMillan - harmonica
- Farrell Morris - percussion
- David Briggs, Bobby Ogdin, Hargus "Pig" Robbins - piano
- John Hughey, Hal Rugg - steel guitar
- George Binkley III, Marvin Chantry, Roy Christensen, Carl Gorodetzky, Lennid Haight, Sheldon Kurland, Ann Migliore, Steven Smith, Donald Teal, Gary Vanosdale - strings
- Archie Jordan - string arrangements (tracks 2,5,6,8)
- Farrell Morris - vibraphone

== Charts ==
Album – Billboard (North America)

Year	Chart	Position
1977	Top Country Albums	26

Singles – Billboard (North America)

Year	Single	Chart	Position
1977	"Hold Me"	Hot Country Singles & Tracks	12
