= Mr. Big Stuff (disambiguation) =

"Mr. Big Stuff" is a 1971 single by Jean Knight.

Mr. Big Stuff may also refer to:

- Mr. Big Stuff (album), a 1971 album by Jean Knight
- "Mr. Big Stuff", a song by Heavy D & the Boyz from the 1987 album Living Large
- "Mr. Big Stuff", a single by Grandmaster Mele-Mel & Scorpio from the 1997 album Right Now
- "Mr. Big Stuff", a song by Biz Markie first released on the album On the Turntable (1998)
