= Mark Carrier (safety) =

American football player and coach (born 1968)

No. 20, 27
- Position: Safety

Personal information
- Born: April 28, 1968 (age 58); Lake Charles, Louisiana, U.S.
- Listed height: 6 ft 1 in (1.85 m)
- Listed weight: 190 lb (86 kg)

Career information
- High school: Long Beach Polytechnic (Long Beach, California)
- College: USC (1987–1989)
- NFL draft: 1990: 1st round, 6th overall pick

Career history

Playing
- Chicago Bears (1990–1996); Detroit Lions (1997–1999); Washington Redskins (2000)

Coaching
- Arizona State (2004–2005) Defensive backs coach; Baltimore Ravens (2006–2009) Defensive backs coach; New York Jets (2010–2011) Defensive line coach; Cincinnati Bengals (2012–2015) Defensive backs coach

Awards and highlights
- NFL Defensive Rookie of the Year (1990); Second-team All-Pro (1990); 3× Pro Bowl (1990, 1991, 1993); NFL interceptions leader (1990); PFWA All-Rookie Team (1990); 100 greatest Bears of All-Time; Jim Thorpe Award (1989); Unanimous All-American (1989); First-team All-American (1988); 2× First-team All-Pac-10 (1988, 1989)

Career NFL statistics
- Tackles: 863
- Interceptions: 32
- Interception yards: 370
- Forced fumbles: 16
- Fumble recoveries: 8
- Defensive touchdowns: 1
- Stats at Pro Football Reference

Mark Anthony Carrier III (born April 28, 1968) is an American former professional football player who was a safety in the National Football League (NFL). He played college football for the USC Trojans, where he won the Jim Thorpe Award. Carrier was selected by the Chicago Bears in the first round of the 1990 NFL draft.

== Early life ==
Carrier went to Long Beach Polytechnic High School and was a letterman in football. In football, he was a three-year varsity starter. Mark was named to the Parade All-American, USA Today All-American, and the Long Beach Press-Telegram's Best-in-the-West teams in 1985. Mark Carrier is the nephew of Créole fiddle player Bébé Carrière of the Carriere Brothers and The Lawtell Playboys and cousin to Creole fiddler Calvin Carriere.

== College career ==
Carrier is a 1989 graduate of the University of Southern California. As a junior in 1989, Carrier was named to the Playboy All-American team and became USC's first winner of the Jim Thorpe Award, presented annually to the nation's best defensive back. A two-time consensus first-team All-American, Carrier had seven interceptions in 1989, plus 107 tackles, three fumble recoveries and ten pass deflections. A three-year starter for the Trojans, Carrier finished his collegiate career with thirteen interceptions. Carrier was inducted into the USC Athletic Hall of Fame, class of 2006.

== Professional career ==
He was selected in the first round with the sixth pick of the 1990 NFL draft by the Chicago Bears. Carrier lined up at free safety and won Defensive Rookie of the Year in 1990, after he led the NFL with 10 interceptions, which also set the Bears record for most interceptions in a season. Carrier has also been fined for several of his hits, and also suffered three concussions during his career. Carrier played for the Bears from 1990 to 1996, the Detroit Lions (1997–99) and Washington Redskins until 2000. Carrier was known as a smart player, often leading the defense. He played in three Pro Bowls, in 1990, 1991 and 1993.

=== Career statistics ===
| Year | Team | G | Tackles | | | | Fumbles | | | Interceptions | | | | | |
| Year | Team | G | Comb | Total | Ast | Sacks | FF | FR | Yds | Int | Yds | Avg | Lng | TD | PD |
|---|---|---|---|---|---|---|---|---|---|---|---|---|---|---|---|
| 1990 | CHI | 16 | 122 | 0 | 0 | 0.0 | 0 | 2 | 0 | 10 | 39 | 4 | 14 | 0 | 0 |
| 1991 | CHI | 16 | 93 | 0 | 0 | 0.0 | 0 | 1 | 0 | 2 | 54 | 27 | 39 | 0 | 0 |
| 1993 | CHI | 16 | 62 | 47 | 15 | 0.0 | 0 | 0 | 0 | 4 | 94 | 24 | 34 | 1 | 6 |
| 1994 | CHI | 16 | 69 | 52 | 17 | 0.0 | 1 | 0 | 0 | 2 | 10 | 5 | 7 | 0 | 12 |
| 1995 | CHI | 16 | 72 | 64 | 8 | 0.0 | 0 | 1 | 0 | 0 | 0 | 0 | 0 | 0 | 10 |
| 1996 | CHI | 13 | 49 | 37 | 12 | 0.0 | 2 | 1 | 0 | 2 | 0 | 0 | 0 | 0 | 5 |
| 1997 | DET | 16 | 75 | 54 | 21 | 0.0 | 0 | 0 | 0 | 5 | 94 | 19 | 66 | 0 | 14 |
| 1998 | DET | 13 | 53 | 41 | 12 | 0.0 | 2 | 0 | 0 | 3 | 33 | 11 | 33 | 0 | 8 |
| 1999 | DET | 15 | 73 | 59 | 14 | 0.0 | 3 | 1 | 0 | 3 | 16 | 5 | 16 | 0 | 8 |
| 2000 | WSH | 15 | 68 | 55 | 13 | 0.0 | 1 | 0 | 0 | 1 | 30 | 30 | 30 | 0 | 4 |
| Career | | 152 | 736 | 409 | 112 | 0.0 | 11 | 4 | 0 | 32 | 370 | 12 | 66 | 1 | 67 |

== Coaching career ==
From 2004 to 2005, Carrier was defensive backs coach at Arizona State University.

In 2006, the Baltimore Ravens hired Carrier as secondary defense coach.

In 2010, he was hired by the New York Jets as defensive line coach.

On February 13, 2012, he was hired by the Cincinnati Bengals as defensive backs coach. He was fired in 2016.

Since 2016 Carrier has worked for Sports USA Radio Network as a color analyst for NFL and college football.

Since 2019, Carrier has been an Associate Athletic Director at Loyola Academy.
