= Richard's Club =

Coordinates: 30°31′23″N 92°09′29″W

- Interactive map of Richard's Club
- Address: 11154 Hwy. 190; Lawtell, Louisiana; United States
- Owner: Eddie Richard, Kermon Richard
- Type: dancehall, music venue
- Events: zydeco, rhythm and blues, blues
- Capacity: 350

Construction
- Opened: July 4, 1947
- Closed: 2006
- Years active: 1947–2006

Richard's Club was a nightclub and music venue in Lawtell, Louisiana. Proprietor Eddie Richard opened the club in 1947. It was a venue of the Southern Chitlin' Circuit, particularly as a stop between New Orleans and Houston on US Highway 190. Later it became a well known and historically significant zydeco venue. By the late 1990s, the club was regarded as "zydeco's answer to the Grand Ole Opry."

The building was described by Rounder producer Scott Billington as "a long, low-ceilinged building that seemed in danger of shaking loose from its foundations when the music got loud and the dancers filled the floor." In 2008, journalist Nathan Stubbs described the club as still having "7-foot high ceilings, the small wooden tables and 1970s bucket chairs, the well-worn uneven wooden floor, the screen windows with no glass. The bandstand is the same basic platform, one foot up from the dance floor. There are fans, but still no air conditioning."

== History ==
In its early days, the club hosted blues and rhythm and blues acts and boxing matches.

Eddie Richard booked Clifton Chenier before he was well known; however, Chenier soon became popular, and the club consequently shifted completely to zydeco.

After Eddie's death in 1979, his son Kermon took over the business.

In 1984, Boozoo Chavis started playing regularly at Richard's Club, a moment Scott Billington has identified as significant for zydeco.

In 1989, Rounder Records recorded and released the album Zydeco Live! Direct from Richard's Club, Lawtell, Louisiana. This album has the only live recordings released by John Delafose.

Richard's Club closed in 2006 as the result of a family dispute. The same year, Michael DeClouet purchased the building and, after upkeep renovations and a legal battle over the "Richard's Club" name, reopened the nightclub under the name Zydeco Hall of Fame in 2008.

In 2012, local businessman and politician Dustin Miller purchased the building and reopened the dancehall under the name Miller's Zydeco Hall of Fame. However, in 2017, the building burned down overnight due to arson.

== Notable performers ==
- Chris Ardoin and Double Clutchin'
- Bobby "Blue" Bland
- Boozoo Chavis and the Magic Sounds
- Clifton Chenier
- John Delafose and the Eunice Playboys
- Rockin' Dopsie
- Keith Frank
- John Lee Hooker
- Beau Jocque and the Zydeco Hi-Rollers, who have a song called "Richard's Club"
- B. B. King
- Rosie Ledet
- Nathan and the Zydeco Cha-Chas
- Louis Prodhomme and the Zydeco Express
- Rockin' Sidney
- Terrance Simien and the Zydeco Experience
- Big Mama Thornton
- Zydeco Force
