= Midnight Angel (disambiguation) =

Midnight Angel is a 1976 album by Barbara Mandrell.

Midnight Angel may also refer to:

- "Midnight Angel" (song), the title track and lead single from the Barbara Mandrell album
- "Midnight Angel", a song by Penny McLean from the album Penny
- Midnight Angel, one of the wrestling personae of Japanese wrestler Io Shirai
- An alternate title of the 1987 Hong Kong film Angel
