= Midnight Angel =

Studio album by Barbara Mandrell
- Released: October 29, 1976
- Studio: RCA Victor (Nashville, Tennessee)
- Genre: Country
- Label: ABC/Dot Records
- Producer: Tom Collins

Barbara Mandrell chronology
This Is Barbara Mandrell (1976)	Midnight Angel (1976)	Lovers, Friends and Strangers (1977)

Singles from Midnight Angel
- 1. "Midnight Angel" Released: November 29, 1976; 2. "Married, But Not to Each Other" Released: March 7, 1977

Midnight Angel is the fifth solo studio album by American country music singer, Barbara Mandrell, released in October 1976. The album peaked at number 24 on the Top Country Albums chart. Two singles were released, "Midnight Angel", which peaked at number 16 on the Top Country Singles chart, and "Married, But Not to Each Other", which peaked at number three. Following its success on the singles chart, "Married, But Not to Each Other" was included on Mandrell's Lovers, Friends and Strangers album in May 1977.

A Cash Box review praised the album's beat and Mandrell's vocals, stating that the songs were likely to be highly requested for public play.

== Content ==
Like Barbara's previous album, Midnight Angel was not as successful as future releases. However, the album set the stage for her future recordings under the label. With her second album under ABC/Dot, the subject matter of her songs got sexier, as exemplified in "Pillow Pleasure", "Slippin' Around Again", and the pop-tinged "I Never Said I Love You." Like Barbara's previous album, This Is Barbara Mandrell, Midnight Angel also consisted of 11 tracks.

== Track listing ==
1. "From Saturday Night to Sunday Quiet" (John Schweers)
2. "Partners" (Kent Robbins)
3. "Better Off by Myself" (Geoffrey Morgan)
4. "Fool's Gold" (Robert John Jones)
5. "It's a Beautiful Morning With You" (Archie Jordan)
6. "Pillow Pleasure" (John Schweers)
7. "Midnight Angel" (Bill Anthony, Bob Morrison)
8. "I Count You" (Barbara Mandrell, Schweers)
9. "I Never Said I Love You" (Archie Jordan, Hal David)
10. "Slippin' Around Again" (Roger Bowling, Jumpin' Gene Simmons)
11. "Married, But Not to Each Other" (Denise LaSalle, Francis Miller)

== Personnel ==
- Barbara Mandrell - lead vocals
- Gordon Stoker, Hoyt Hawkins, Lea Jane Berinati, Janie Fricke, Neal Matthews, Ray Walker, The Jordanaires - backing vocals
- Mike Leech - bass guitar
- Kenny Malone - drums
- Tommy Williams - fiddle
- Jimmy Capps, Steve Gibson, Glenn Keener, Jack Mollette, Billy Sanford, Jerry Stembridge, Chip Young - guitar
- Charlie McCoy - harmonica
- Farrell Morris - percussion
- Bobby Ogdin, Hargus "Pig" Robbins - piano
- John Hughey - steel guitar
- Archie Jordan - string arrangements (tracks 1,5,9,11)
- Charlie McCoy, Farrell Morris - vibraphone

== Charts ==
Album – Billboard (North America)

Year	Chart	Position
1976	Top Country Albums	#26

Singles – Billboard (North America)

Year	Single	Chart	Position
1976	"Midnight Angel"	Hot Country Singles & Tracks	16
1977	"Married But Not to Each Other"	Hot Country Singles & Tracks	3
