= Groove Me =

1970 single by King Floyd

Single by King Floyd

from the album King Floyd
- A-side: "What Our Love Needs"
- B-side: "Groove Me"
- Released: September 1970
- Recorded: 1970
- Studio: Malaco Records Studio; Jackson, Mississippi
- Genre: R&B; funk; pop
- Length: 3:04
- Label: Chimneyville, Atlantic
- Songwriter: King Floyd
- Producer: Wardell Quezergue

King Floyd singles chronology
"What Our Love Needs" (1970)	"Groove Me" (1970)	"Baby Let Me Kiss You" (1971)

"Groove Me" is a song written and recorded by R&B singer King Floyd. Released from his eponymous album in late 1970, it was a crossover hit, spending four non-consecutive weeks at number-one on Billboard Soul chart and peaking at No. 6 on the Billboard Hot 100. In Canada the song reached No. 11.

The song was recorded and produced by Wardell Quezergue at Malaco Records' Jackson, Mississippi recording studios during the same session as another Quezergue-produced song, Jean Knight's "Mr. Big Stuff". "Groove Me" was originally released as the B-side to Floyd's "What Our Love Needs" on the Malaco subsidiary Chimneyville. When New Orleans disc jockey George Vinnett started playing the B-side, the song began meriting attention, and as the record emerged as a local smash, Atlantic Records scooped up national distribution rights.

== Personnel ==
No credits are listed for the Malaco studio musicians on the record. According to Rob Bowman's liner notes from the 1999 box set, The Last Soul Company: Malaco, A Thirty Year Retrospective, the musicians for this session included:

- Jimmy Honeycutt – saxophone
- Bob Cheesman – trumpet
- Wardell Quezergue – organ
- Jerry Puckett – guitar
- Vernie Robbins – bass
- James Stroud – drums

However, during this time at Malaco, horn lines were typically played by saxophonist Hugh Garraway and trumpeter Peary Lomax. Lomax said he played all trumpet parts on this record and on "Mr. Big Stuff."

== Origin ==
According to Rob Bowman, Canadian professor of ethnomusicology, "Groove Me" had been inspired by a young college student who had worked about twenty feet away from Floyd at an east L.A. box factory. In Floyd's words: "She'd just watch me and smile at me all day. When I went to the water fountain, she would make it her purpose to come up to the water fountain. But, I was so shy. So, I decided one day that I was gonna write this poem and give it to her and I wrote 'Groove Me.' Believe it or not, after I finished it she never came back to work. It blew me away. So, I never gave her the poem. Man, I'd sure like to meet her one day just to thank her!"

== Cover versions ==
- Etta James covered "Groove Me" on her 1976 album "Etta Is Betta Than Evvah!
- The Blues Brothers covered the song in their hit 1978 album Briefcase Full of Blues, giving the song a Jamaican reggae feel.
- In 1979, Fern Kinney, who sang backing vocals on King Floyd's original version, released a disco version of the song on her album Groove Me, which reached No. 6 on the Billboard dance chart. In Canada the song reached No. 20.
- In 2002, Angie Stone covered the song in the soundtrack for the movie Austin Powers in Goldmember.
