= Louisiana's 40th House of Representatives district =

American legislative district

Louisiana's 40th State House of Representatives district
Representative
Dustin Miller; D–Opelousas

Louisiana's 40th House of Representatives district is one of 105 Louisiana House of Representatives districts. It is currently represented by Democrat Dustin Miller of Opelousas.

== Geography ==
HD40 includes the city of Opelousas.

== Election results ==
Year	Winning candidate	Party	Percent	Opponent	Party	Percent
2011	Ledricka Thierry	Democratic	78.6%	Joe Pitre	Democratic	21.4%
2015	Dustin Miller	Democratic	56.2	Donovan Hudson	Democratic	43.8%
2019	Dustin Miller	Democratic	70.3%	Allen Guillory Sr.	Republican	29.7%
2023	Dustin Miller	Republican	81.3%	Allen Guillory Sr.	Democratic	18.7%
