= Married, But Not to Each Other =

"Married But Not to Each Other"

Single by Denise LaSalle

from the album Here I Am Again
- B-side: "Who's the Fool"
- Released: March 1976
- Genre: R&B; soul
- Length: 3:40
- Label: Westbound
- Songwriters: Denise LaSalle; Francis Miler
- Producer: Crajon Enterprises

Denise LaSalle singles chronology
"Here I Am Again" (1975)	"Married But Not to Each Other" (1976)	"Hellfire Loving" (1976)

"Married But Not to Each Other" is a song originally recorded by American R&B artist Denise LaSalle. It was composed by LaSalle, along with Francis Miller. LaSalle's original version became a major hit on the American R&B music chart in 1976, reaching the top 20 that year. It was one of several singles composed by LaSalle that became a charting single. It was later covered in 1977 by American country artist Barbara Mandrell, whose version reached the top five of the American country chart.

== Background ==
Denise LaSalle had initial success in 1971 with her R&B crossover pop hit "Trapped by a Thing Called Love". She had several more years of commercial success and was signed later on by ABC Records where she cut several more records. Unlike other R&B performers of the era, LaSalle recorded songs she composed herself. Among these self-penned songs was the tune "Married But Not to Each Other". LaSalle composed the song with Francis Miller. The track was produced by Crajon Enterprises while she was under contract at Westbound Records in the mid 1970s.

The song discusses both sides of a couple's struggle to hide their external love affairs to avoid hurting each other's feelings.

== Release and chart performance ==
"Married But Not to Each Other" was released as a single on Westbound Records in March 1976. The single was pressed as a seven inch vinyl recording containing a B-side titled "Who's the Fool" (also penned by LaSalle). The single spent 17 weeks on America's Billboard R&B songs chart, peaking at number 16 in May 1976. The song was one of her final top 20 hits in her recording career. The song also climbed to number two on the Billboard Bubbling Under Hot 100 singles chart in 1976. In 1976, the song appeared on LaSalle's studio album titled Here I Am Again.

== Track listing ==
7" vinyl single

- "Married But Not to Each Other" – 3:40
- "Who's the Fool" – 2:39

== Charts ==
Chart performance for "Married, But Not to Each Other"
Chart (1976)	Peak position
US Bubbling Under Hot 100 (Billboard)	2
US Hot R&B/Hip-Hop Songs (Billboard)	16

== Barbara Mandrell cover ==
"Married But Not to Each Other"

Single by Barbara Mandrell

from the album Lovers, Friends and Strangers
- B-side: "Fool's Gold"
- Released: March 1977
- Recorded: September 1976
- Genre: Country-pop; Countrypolitan
- Length: 3:04
- Label: ABC; Dot
- Songwriters: Denise LaSalle; Frances Miller
- Producer: Tom Collins

Barbara Mandrell singles chronology
"Midnight Angel" (1976)	"Married But Not to Each Other" (1977)	"Hold Me" (1977)

=== Background and recording ===
"Married But Not to Each Other" was notably covered by American country artist Barbara Mandrell in 1977. She had recently signed with ABC/Dot Records and began working with producer Tom Collins. Collins helped establish Mandrell's breakthrough as a country artist by shifting her towards a country pop style that incorporated R&B elements. Among the songs she recorded for ABC/Dot was Denise LaSalle's "Married But Not to Each Other". Tom Collins produced Mandrell on the recording in September 1976.

=== Release and chart performance ===
"Married But Not to Each Other" was released as a single on ABC/Dot Records in March 1977. It was backed on the B-side by the song "Fool's Gold". The track was issued by the label as a seven inch vinyl single. The single spent 17 weeks on America's Billboard country songs chart, peaking at number three by June 1977. Up to that point in her singing career, it was Barbara Mandrell's highest-charting single on the country chart. In Canada, the single also climbed to the number three position on the RPM country chart. It was also her highest-charting single in Canada up to that point. The song was released on Mandrell's first album for the label, which was titled Lovers, Friends and Strangers. The album was released in 1977.

=== Track listing ===
7" vinyl single

- "Married But Not to Each Other" – 2:56
- "Fool's Gold" – 2:24

=== Charts ===
Chart performance for "Married But Not to Each Other"
Chart (1977)	Peak position
Canada Country Songs (RPM)	3
US Hot Country Songs (Billboard)	3
