= Calvin Carrière =

American Creole fiddler

Calvin Carriére (September 10, 1921 – March 3, 2002) was an American, Creole fiddler, who played zydeco music. He was styled the 'King Of Zydeco Fiddle'.

Carriére was born in Lawtell, Louisiana, United States. He learned fiddle from his Uncle Joseph "Bébé" Carrière (b. 1908) and accordion from his father Eraste 'Dolon' Carriere (b. 1900). They learned from their father Ernest. The Creole and La-la music he played with his father and uncle: "The Carriere Brothers". Over 18 years this developed into the Zydeco band "Delton Broussard and the Lawtell Playboys". Carriére recalled: "We used to work in the fields and every Sunday Delton would sit on the porch and take lessons from my daddy."

The next 21 years he performed with many including accordionist Nolton Simien. His LA Black fiddle style developed playing string band, Cajun, Creole, and traditional zydeco. Some of his best work can be heard on his session with Lil' John Simien.

Some recordings: "La-la: Louisiana Black French Music", "Zodico: Louisiana Creole Music", "Goldman Thibodeaux and Friends", and a recording on La Lou records: "John Simien and the Opelousas Playboys".
