= That's What Friends Are For (Barbara Mandrell song) =

Single by Barbara Mandrell

from the album This Is Barbara Mandrell
- B-side: "The Beginning of the End"
- Released: April 12, 1976
- Recorded: February 1976
- Genre: Country-pop; Countrypolitan
- Length: 2:39
- Label: ABC; Dot
- Songwriters: Robert Shaw Parsons; Ed Penney
- Producer: Tom Collins

Barbara Mandrell singles chronology
"Standing Room Only" (1975)	"That's What Friends Are For" (1976)	"Love Is Thin Ice" (1976)

"That's What Friends Are For" is a song written by Robert Shaw Parsons and Ed Penney, and recorded by American country music artist Barbara Mandrell. It was released in April 1976 as the second single from the album This Is Barbara Mandrell. It reached the top 20 of the American country songs chart.

== Background and recording ==
Barbara Mandrell had her first charting singles with Columbia Records, but after switching to ABC/Dot she developed a musical identity that brought greater success. She started working with producer Tom Collins, who crafted a Countrypolitan sound that helped her music reach larger audiences. One of the singles she cut during this period was 1976's "That's What Friends Are For", which was written by Robert Shaw Parsons and Ed Penney. Collins produced Mandrell's third ABC/Dot session in February 1976 in Nashville, Tennessee. On the same session, Mandrell cut two additional tracks, including the future single "Love Is Thin Ice".

== Release and chart performance ==
"That's What Friends Are For" was released as a single on ABC/Dot Records on April 12, 1976. It was backed on the B-side by the song "The Beginning of the End". The track was issued by the label as a seven inch vinyl single. The single spent 13 weeks on America's Billboard country songs chart, peaking at number 16 by August 1976. It was Mandrell's second single issued by the label. In Canada, the single climbed to the number 27 position on the RPM country chart. The song was released on Mandrell's first album for the label, which was titled This Is Barbara Mandrell. The album was released in 1976.

== Track listing ==
7" vinyl single

- "That's What Friends Are For" – 2:39
- "The Beginning of the End" – 2:31

== Charts ==
Chart performance for "That's What Friends Are For"
Chart (1976)	Peak position
Canada Country Songs (RPM)	27
US Hot Country Songs (Billboard)	16
