= Standing Room Only (Barbara Mandrell song) =

Single by Barbara Mandrell

from the album This Is Barbara Mandrell
- B-side: "Can't Help But Wonder"
- Released: December 1, 1975
- Recorded: September 1975
- Genre: Country-pop; Countrypolitan
- Length: 3:04
- Label: ABC; Dot
- Songwriters: Susan Manchester; Charles Silver
- Producer: Tom Collins

Barbara Mandrell singles chronology
| "Wonder When My Baby's Coming Home" (1974) | "Standing Room Only" (1975) | "That's What Friends Are For" (1976) |

"Standing Room Only" is a song written by Susan Manchester and Charles Silver, and recorded by American country music artist Barbara Mandrell. It was released in December 1975 as the first single from the album This Is Barbara Mandrell. It was one of her first top ten singles in her career.

== Background and recording ==
Although had several charting singles for Columbia Records in the early 1970s, she did not achieve greater commercial success until switching to ABC/Dot Records in 1975. She started working with producer Tom Collins, who crafted a Countrypolitan sound that helped her music reach larger audiences. Among these songs was 1975's "Standing Room Only". The song was described by writers Robert K. Oermann and Mary A. Bufwack as a "cheating song" where Mandrell portrays the character of "an angry wife". Collins produced Mandrell's first ABC/Dot session in September 1975 in Nashville, Tennessee. On the same session, Mandrell cut one additional track called "I Can't Help But Wonder".

== Release and chart performance ==
"Standing Room Only" was released as a single on ABC/Dot Records on December 1, 1975. It was backed on the B-side by the song "Can't Help But Wonder". The track was issued by the label as a seven inch vinyl single. The single spent 17 weeks on America's Billboard country songs chart, peaking at number five by March 1976. It was Mandrell's first single issued by the label and her highest-charting single up to that point. In Canada, the single climbed to the number 37 position on the RPM country chart. The song was released on Mandrell's first album for the label, which was titled This Is Barbara Mandrell. The album was released in 1976.

== Track listing ==
7" vinyl single

- "Standing Room Only" – 3:04
- "Can't Help But Wonder" – 3:00

== Charts ==
Chart performance for "Standing Room Only"
| Chart (1975–1976) | Peak position |
|---|---|
| Canada Country Songs (RPM) | 37 |
| US Hot Country Songs (Billboard) | 5 |
