= My Toot-Toot =

Zydeco song written by Sidney Simien

Single by Rockin' Sidney

from the album My Toot-Toot
- B-side: "Jalapeno Lena"
- Released: 1985
- Genre: Zydeco, country, novelty
- Length: 3:28
- Label: Epic
- Songwriter: Sidney Simien
- Producers: Sidney Simien, Floyd Soileau, Huey P. Meaux

Rockin' Sidney singles chronology
"My Zydeco Shoes" (1984)	"My Toot-Toot" (1985)	"Dance and Show Off" (1985)

Official audio
- "My Toot-Toot" on YouTube

"My Toot-Toot", also popularly known as "Don't Mess with My Toot Toot" or "(Don't Mess with) My Toot Toot", is a song written by Sidney Simien and performed by him under his stage name Rockin' Sidney. Simien wrote the song and released it on the Maison de Soul Records label in Ville Platte, Louisiana. In October 1984, he included the tune on his third album, My Zydeco Shoes Got the Zydeco Blues, recording the entire album at his home studio in Lake Charles, Louisiana and playing all the instruments himself.

== Content and history ==
In January 1985, "My Toot-Toot" was released as a single in Louisiana and Texas and became Rockin' Sidney's first true regional hit. Thanks to Cleon Floyd, manager of R&B singer and uncle to King Floyd, it became a huge New Orleans hit. Floyd first heard the crowd's reaction to the song at a bill headlined by soul musician Solomon Burke. Cleon was also the president of the Orleans Street Jocks Association and took twenty copies of the record back to the city; he quickly had to order more. By Mardi Gras, it was a jukebox and record hop smash.

Huey Meaux got the original leased to Epic Records, who released it nationally, and for a brief moment Rockin' Sidney made musical history. Epic managed to get the song into the country Top 40, where it stayed for 18 weeks. It was the first zydeco song to receive major airplay on pop, rock and country radio stations. Later in 1985, "My Toot-Toot" was certified platinum and won the 1986 Grammy Award for Best Ethnic or Traditional Folk Recording.

As a result, Simien was featured in People magazine, Rolling Stone, Billboard and Music City News and appeared on many national TV shows, including Nashville Now, Church Street Station, Hee Haw, Austin City Limits, John Fogerty's Showtime Special, New Country and Charlie Daniels Jam. He was also a guest celebrity on You Can Be a Star.

== Covers ==
"My Toot-Toot" has been covered by many artists, including Fats Domino, Doug Kershaw, Rosie Ledet, Jean Knight, Terrance Simien, Denise LaSalle, Jimmy C. Newman, John Fogerty and Jello Biafra. Other versions include those by Louisiana zydeco accordionist and singer Fernest Arceneaux, British-Jamaican television personality Rustie Lee, Swedish dansband Lasse Stefanz and Irish country singer Mike Denver. LaSalle's 1985 version was a hit, peaking at number six in the UK Singles Chart, number three in the Austrian chart and number 76 in the Australia chart.

=== Other-language covers ===
A Spanish version by La Sonora Dinamita titled "Mi Cucu" sold over a million copies in Mexico, Central America, and South America. A German beer company licensed the song to use in their radio and television commercials. The German cover version "Mein Tuut Tuut" by Leinemann reached number 15 on the West German chart in 1985.

== Charts ==
=== Weekly charts ===
==== Rockin' Sidney version ====
Chart (1985)	Peak position
Switzerland (Schweizer Hitparade)	8
UK Singles (Official Charts)	91
US Hot Country Singles (Billboard)	19

==== Jean Knight version ====
Chart (1985)	Peak position
Australia (Kent Music Report)	62
New Zealand (Recorded Music NZ)	23
South Africa (Springbok Radio)	2
US Billboard Hot 100	50
US Hot Black Singles (Billboard)	59

==== Denise LaSalle version ====
Chart (1985)	Peak position
Australia (Kent Music Report)	76
Austria (Ö3 Austria Top 40)	3
Belgium (Ultratop 50 Flanders)	23
Europe (European Top 100 Singles)	17
Ireland (IRMA)	5
Netherlands (Single Top 100)	41
New Zealand (Recorded Music NZ)	37
Switzerland (Schweizer Hitparade)	6
UK Singles (Official Charts)	6
US Hot Black Singles (Billboard) Charted as "My Tu-Tu"	79
West Germany (GfK)	11

==== "Mein Tuut Tuut" ====
Chart (1985)	Peak position
Europe (European Top 100 Singles)	92
West Germany (GfK)	15

=== Year-end charts ===
==== Denise LaSalle version ====
Chart (1985)	Position
Austria (Ö3 Austria Top 40)	23
UK Singles (OCC)	86

==== "Mein Tuut Tuut" ====
Chart (1985)	Position
West Germany (Media Control)	73

== In popular culture ==
"My Toot-Toot" has been used in soundtracks of the motion pictures Hard Luck, One Good Cop and The Big Easy.

Over 20 years after "My Toot-Toot" debuted, it continued to draw royalties from commercial use in Europe, and cover versions in several languages by dozens of musicians.

In 2013, Melissa McCarthy parodied the song in an episode of Saturday Night Live. She played "Casey Patterson", a contestant on The Voice looking to leave her career replacing trailer hitches on U-Hauls, and to move from the "basement without the roof", which Jason Sudeikis' character Blake Shelton described as "a hole".
