= Love Is Thin Ice =

Single by Barbara Mandrell

from the album This Is Barbara Mandrell
- B-side: "Will We Ever Make Love in Love Again"
- Released: July 26, 1976
- Recorded: February 1976
- Genre: Country-pop; Countrypolitan
- Length: 2:45
- Label: ABC; Dot
- Songwriter(s): Geoffrey Morgan
- Producer(s): Tom Collins

Barbara Mandrell singles chronology
"That's What Friends Are For" (1976)	"Love Is Thin Ice" (1976)	"Midnight Angel" (1976)

"Love Is Thin Ice" is a song written by Geoffrey Morgan, recorded by American country music artist Barbara Mandrell. It was released in July 1976 as the third single from the album This Is Barbara Mandrell. It reached the top 40 of the American country songs chart.

== Background and recording ==
Barbara Mandrell had her first charting singles with Columbia Records, but after switching to ABC/Dot she reached a larger audience that brought greater commercial success to her singing career. She started working with producer Tom Collins, who crafted a Countrypolitan sound that helped her music reach larger audiences. One of the singles she cut during this period was 1976's "Love Is Thin Ice", which was written by Geoffrey Morgan. Collins produced Mandrell's third ABC/Dot session in February 1976 in Nashville, Tennessee. On the same session, Mandrell cut two additional tracks, including the future single "That's What Friends Are For".

"Love Is Thin Ice" was released as a single on ABC/Dot Records on July 26, 1976. It was backed on the B-side by the song "Will Ever Make Love in Love Again". The track was issued by the label as a seven inch vinyl single. The single spent 12 weeks on America's Billboard country songs chart, peaking at number 24 by October 1976. It was Mandrell's third single issued by the label. The song was released on Mandrell's first album for the label, which was titled This Is Barbara Mandrell. The album was released in 1976.

== Track listing ==
7" vinyl single

- "Love Is Thin Ice" – 2:45
- "Will We Ever Make Love in Love Again" – 2:40

== Charts ==
Chart performance for "Love Is Thin Ice"
Chart (1976)	Peak position
US Hot Country Songs (Billboard)	24
