= Rockin' Sidney =

American zydeco and R&B musician and songwriter

- Promotional image of Rockin' Sidney

Background information
- Born: Sidney Simien; April 9, 1938; Lebeau, Louisiana, U.S.
- Died: February 25, 1998 (aged 59) Lake Charles, Louisiana, U.S.
- Genres: R&B, zydeco, soul, swamp blues
- Occupations: Musician, singer
- Instruments: Vocals, accordion
- Years active: 1957–1998
- Labels: Fame, Jin, Goldband, Maison de Soul, Epic
- Formerly of: Count Rockin' Sidney and his Dukes

Sidney Simien (April 9, 1938 – February 25, 1998), known professionally as Rockin' Sidney, was an American R&B, zydeco, and soul musician who began recording in the late 1950s and continued performing until his death. He is best known for his 1985 single "My Toot-Toot", which reached top 20 on the Billboard Hot Country Songs charts and earned him a Grammy Award.

== Biography ==
Sidney Simien was born on April 9, 1938, in Lebeau, Louisiana. He was born into a Creole French-speaking family and was a descendant of Antoine—of Marseille, France—and Marie Simien (who was a free woman of color and a plantation owner). Sidney himself was born in the tiny farming community of Lebeau, St. Landry Parish, Louisiana, United States. Sidney took up the guitar at an early age. He started his musical career at age 14 or 15 playing harmonica and guitar. His first gig was as backup for his uncle Frank Simien. By Sidney's late teens, he was leading his own band as Sidney Simien and His All Stars, which included several members of his family. In 1957, at the age of 18, he recorded his first side, "Make Me Understand," on the short-lived Carl label. "No Good Woman" became a small hit in Louisiana in 1962, while the flip side, "You Ain't Nothin' But Fine" brought him his first national attention as a songwriter. The Fabulous Thunderbirds recorded the song on their second album What's the Word. Before that, Sidney had recorded "She's My Morning Coffee" b/w "I'm Calling You" on the Jin label.

Although his real success came from zydeco, Sidney did not start out playing the accordion or Cajun music. Heavily influenced by local musicians such as Slim Harpo and Cookie and his Cupcakes, Sidney made R&B-styled recordings briefly on the Louisiana record label, Fame, during the late 1950s. He was often backed by George Lewis on harmonica and Katie Webster on piano. Floyd Soileau's Jin Records label released nine Rockin' Sidney singles between 1957–1964. In 1963 his single "No Good Woman" sold well in South Louisiana and East Texas and was well received by music critics, but just missed the national Top 100. Sidney also recorded on Rod Records.

In 1965, he and his band The Dukes signed with Eddie Shuler's Louisiana-based Goldband Records. He took to wearing a turban and was known as "Count Rockin' Sidney". During this period he cut well over a dozen R&B, soul, and blues singles such as "Something Working Baby" and "Soul Christmas", without much success. Between the mid-1960s and the late 1970s, Sidney cut well over 50 singles for the Louisiana-based Goldband label, working in a variety of contemporary blues, soul and R&B modes; none proved successful.

=== Zydeco ===
In the late 1970s Sidney was performing solo organ gigs at Lake Charles hotels and lounges when he recognized zydeco's growing popularity. Floyd Soileau takes partial credit, saying "I suppose it was the mid-'70s when I suggested that he pick up the accordion and start doing zydeco which was then making a comeback." Sidney quickly added the instrument to his repertoire and made that traditional folk music of Louisiana his focus. Zydeco was long familiar to him, from his Creole heritage. His Clifton Chenier and Buckwheat Zydeco parodies became one of his performance highlights. For Chenier, Sidney dressed up as the zydeco monarch, complete with a crown, cape and gold tooth. The Buckwheat bit was done with a ventriloquist dummy. His first zydeco album, Give Me a Good Time Woman was released in 1982 on the Maison de Soul label.

"He already knew keyboards and that was half the battle," said Soileau. In the late 1970s, Sidney was recording for a new label, Bally Hoo, and started his own publishing company, Sid Sim Publishing. His zydeco talents were immediately recognized and he had another hit with "Louisiana Creole Man." He also signed a lease agreement with Floyd Soileau to distribute his recordings on Soileau's Maison de Soul Records label, giving Soileau's Flat Town Music Company a share of the profits. By the early 1980s, Sidney had recorded two successful albums for Maison de Soul, Give Me A Good Time Woman and Boogie, Blues 'N' Zydeco.

=== "My Toot-Toot" ===
His big moment came in 1984 when "My Toot-Toot" made him internationally known. Sidney wrote the song, and released it on the Maison de Soul Records label in Ville Platte, Louisiana. In October 1984, he included the tune on his third album, My Zydeco Shoes Got the Zydeco Blues. He recorded the entire album at his home studio in Lake Charles, and played all the instruments himself. In January 1985, "My Toot-Toot" was released as a single in Louisiana and Texas, and became his first true regional hit. Thanks to Cleon Floyd, manager of R&B singer (and uncle to) King Floyd, it became a huge New Orleans hit. Floyd first heard the crowd's reaction to the song at a bill headlined by Solomon Burke. Cleon was also the president of the Orleans Street Jocks Association and took 20 copies of the record back to the city; he quickly had to order more. By Mardi Gras, it was a jukebox and record hop smash.

Huey Meaux got the original leased to Epic Records (a division of Columbia Records), who released it nationally, and for a brief moment Rockin' Sidney made musical history. Epic managed to get Rockin' Sidney into the country Top 40 where it stayed for 18 weeks. Later that year, "My Toot-Toot" was certified platinum and won a Grammy Award. "My Toot-Toot" became a national and international million-selling phenomenon.

Sidney was featured in People magazine, Rolling Stone, Billboard and Music City News and appeared on numerous national TV shows, including Nashville Now, Church Street Station, Hee Haw, Austin City Limits, John Fogerty's Showtime Special, New Country and the Charlie Daniels Volunteer Jam. He was also a guest celebrity on You Can Be a Star. "My Toot-Toot" was played/featured in the motion pictures Hard Luck, One Good Cop, and The Big Easy.

"My Toot-Toot" has been covered by many artists including Fats Domino, Rosie Ledet, Jean Knight, Terrance Simien, Doug Kershaw, Denise LaSalle, Jimmy C. Newman and John Fogerty. A Spanish version by La Sonora Dinamita titled "Mi Cucu" sold over a million copies in Mexico, Central America, and South America. A German beer company licensed it to use in their radio and television commercials. The German cover version Mein Tuut Tuut by Leinemann reached no. 15 on the German charts in 1985. Over 20 years after "My Toot-Toot" debuted, it continued to draw royalties from commercial use in Europe, and cover versions in several languages by dozens of musicians.

=== Later years ===
Sidney used royalties from "My Toot-Toot" to purchase radio station KAOK in Lake Charles. He also bought Festival City, a 6-acre (2.4 ha) entertainment complex in Lake Charles, and started a record label, ZBC (Zydeco, Blues, Country) Records. After the success of "My Toot-Toot," Sidney toured the United States and Europe and continued to record, characteristically playing all parts. Although nothing before or after ever matched the career-defining success of "My Toot-Toot," several of his songs such as "If It's Good for the Gander," "My Zydeco Shoes," "Jalapeño Lena", and "Ann Cayenne" have become zydeco staples and are played regularly by other bands.

After a long bout with throat cancer, Rockin' Sidney Simien succumbed to the disease in 1998, leaving his legacy to his wife, three sons, and four grandchildren. He was funeralized at his hometown church, Immaculate Conception in Lebeau, and buried in the church cemetery.

== Discography ==
=== Albums ===
Year	Album	Chart Positions	
Year	Album	US Country	US
1982	Give Me a Good Time Woman		
1983	Boogie, Blues 'N' Zydeco		
1984	My Zydeco Shoes Got the Zydeco Blues		
1985	My Toot-Toot	13	166
1986	Hot Steppin'		

=== Singles ===
Year	Single	US Country	Album
1985	"My Toot-Toot"	19	My Toot Toot
