= Hold Me (Barbara Mandrell song) =

Single by Barbara Mandrell

from the album Lovers, Friends and Strangers
- B-side: "This Not Another Cheatin' Song"
- Released: August 1977
- Recorded: March 1977
- Genre: Country-pop; Countrypolitan
- Length: 2:54
- Label: ABC; Dot
- Songwriter: Glenn Ray
- Producer: Tom Collins

Barbara Mandrell singles chronology
"Married But Not to Each Other" (1977)	"Hold Me" (1977)	"Woman to Woman" (1977)

"Hold Me" is a song written by Glenn Ray, and recorded by American country music artist Barbara Mandrell. It was recorded and released in August 1977 as the second single from the album Lovers, Friends and Strangers. It reached the top 20 of the North American country songs charts.

== Background and recording ==
Barbara Mandrell had a series of charting singles at Columbia Records in the early 1970s including the top ten country song "The Midnight Oil". In 1975 she moved to ABC/Dot Records and found a musical style that helped her reach her breakthrough. This was crafted by producer Tom Collins, who helped bring a Countrypolitan sound. One of the singles she cut during this period was 1977's "Hold Me". It was written by Glenn Ray. Collins produced the track's recording session in March 1977 in Nashville, Tennessee.

== Release and chart performance ==
"Hold Me" was released as a single on ABC/Dot Records in August 1977. It was backed on the B-side by the song "This Is Not Another Cheatin' Song". The track was issued by the label as a seven inch vinyl single. The single spent 14 weeks on America's Billboard country songs chart, peaking at number 12 by October 1977. In Canada, the single climbed to the number 14 position on the RPM country chart. The song was released on Mandrell's third ABC/Dot studio album called Lovers, Friends and Strangers.

== Track listing ==
7" vinyl single

- "Hold Me" – 2:54
- "This Is Not Another Cheatin' Song" – 2:47

== Charts ==
Chart performance for "Hold Me"
Chart (1977)	Peak position
Canada Country Songs (RPM)	14
US Hot Country Songs (Billboard)	12
