= Jean Knight =

American R&B and soul singer (1943–2023)

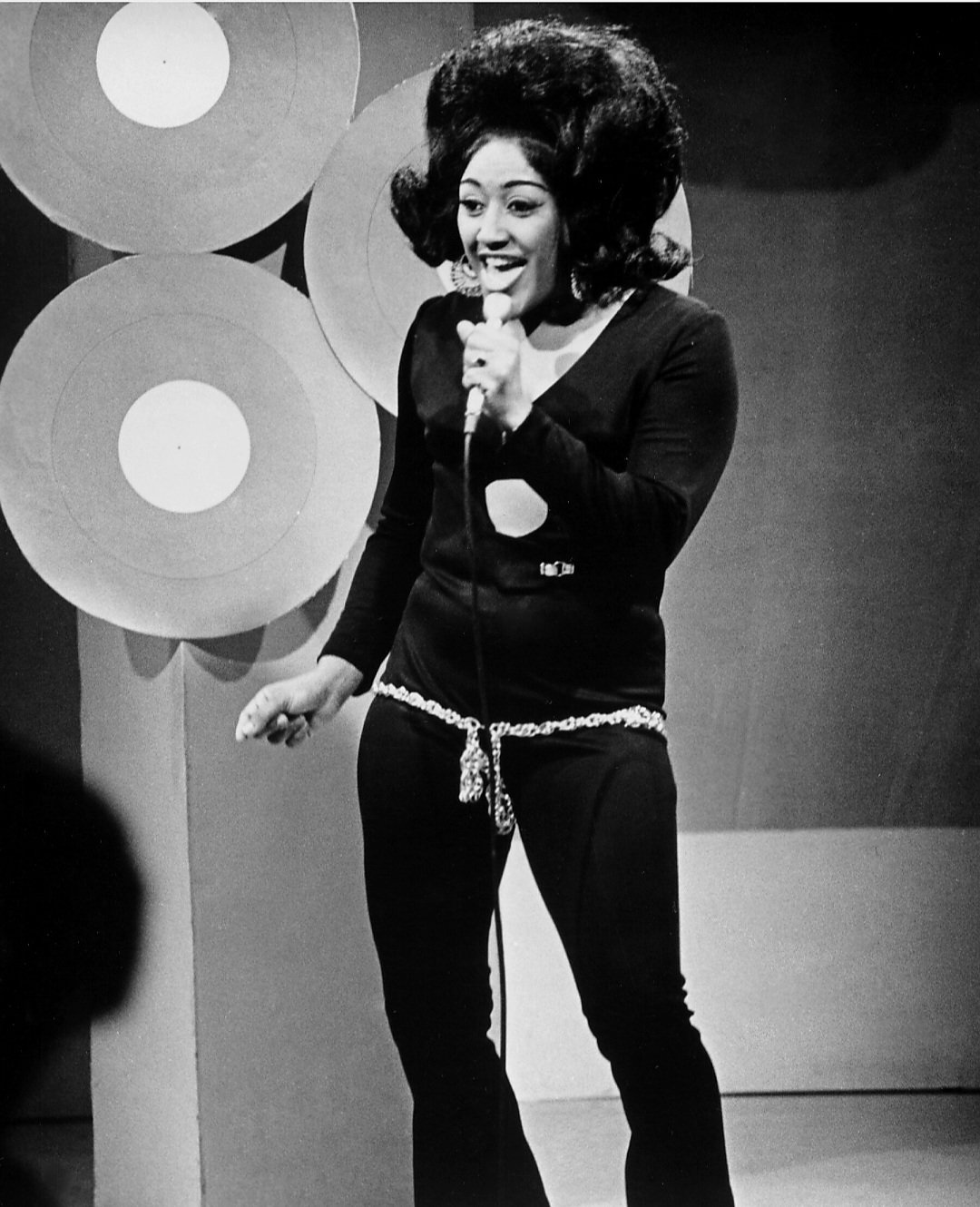
- A press photo of Knight in 1971

Background information
- Born: Jean Audrey Caliste; January 26, 1943; New Orleans, Louisiana, U.S.
- Died: November 22, 2023 (aged 80) Tampa, Florida, U.S.
- Genres: R&B; soul; funk
- Occupation: Singer
- Years active: 1965–2023
- Labels: Jetstream/Tribe; Stax; Mirage; Ichiban; Aim Records

Jean Audrey Knight (née Caliste; January 26, 1943 – November 22, 2023) was an American R&B and soul singer from New Orleans, Louisiana. Launching her professional career in the mid-1960s, Knight was best known for her 1971 hit single "Mr. Big Stuff", released by Stax Records.

== Biography ==
=== Early years ===
Jean Audrey Caliste was born in New Orleans on January 26, 1943. After graduating from high school, she began singing at Laura's Place, her cousin's bar, and caught the attention of many different bands who were willing to accompany her. In 1965, she recorded a demo of a cover version of Jackie Wilson's song "Stop Doggin' Me Around". Her demo attracted record producer Huey Meaux, who signed her to a recording contract at the Jetstream/Tribe record labels. Shortly thereafter, she adopted the professional name of "Jean Knight", because she felt that her surname Caliste was too hard to pronounce. Knight recorded four singles, making a name for herself locally, but was not able to attract any national attention. By the late 1960s, it was obvious that Knight's career was not living up to her high expectations, so she went to work as a baker in the cafeteria of St. Mary's Dominican College in New Orleans. She had been raised a Catholic.

=== Success at Stax ===
In early 1970, Knight was discovered by songwriter Ralph Williams, who wanted her to record songs. With Williams' connections, Knight came in contact with record producer Wardell Quezergue. In May of that year, Knight went to Malaco Studios in Jackson, Mississippi, for a recording session during which she recorded "Mr. Big Stuff." After the session was finished, the song was shopped to producers at several national labels, all of whom rejected it. But when King Floyd's hit "Groove Me" (also recorded at Malaco Studios) became a No. 1 R&B hit in early 1971, a producer at Stax Records remembered Knight's recording of "Mr. Big Stuff", and released it. The song also proved to be an instant smash in 1971, reaching No. 2 on the pop chart and becoming a No. 1 R&B hit. It went double-platinum and received a Grammy nomination for Best R&B Vocal Performance, Female; it lost to Aretha Franklin's version of "Bridge Over Troubled Water". It sold over two million copies and was awarded a gold disc by the R.I.A.A. Knight performed the hit song on Soul Train. An album of the same name proved to be fairly successful. A couple more minor hits followed, but disagreements with her producer and her label terminated Knight's involvement with Stax.

=== Later years ===
After leaving Stax, Knight recorded songs for various small labels, but was not able to gain any more recognition, and ended up performing and touring the local oldie circuit. Things changed in 1981, when Knight met local producer Isaac Bolden, who signed her to his Soulin' label. Together, they came up with a song entitled "You Got the Papers but I Got the Man", an answer song to Richard "Dimples" Fields' record, "She's Got Papers On Me"; that song was leased to Atlantic Records for national release. Soon, Knight found herself touring consistently. In 1985, Knight gained more recognition when she covered Rockin' Sidney's zydeco novelty hit, "My Toot Toot", and found herself in a chart battle with Denise LaSalle's version. While LaSalle's version reached the top ten in the United Kingdom, Knight's version was the more successful in the U.S., reaching No. 50 on the pop chart. Knight was given a chance to perform it on the TV variety show Solid Gold. The song also became Knight's only hit in South Africa, reaching No. 3.

Although Knight waited twelve years to come out with another recording, she continued touring and performing engagements all over the world, particularly in the Southern states. In 2003, Knight performed her biggest hit, "Mr. Big Stuff", on the PBS special Soul Comes Home. Knight continued to tour and make live performances, often with such artists as Gloria Gaynor. In October 2007, the Louisiana Music Hall of Fame honored Knight for her contributions to Louisiana music by inducting her. Knight's song "Do Me" appeared on the 2007 Superbad soundtrack.

=== Personal life and death ===
Knight was married at least twice and had at least one child. Knight married Thomas Commedore and together they had a son. In the early 1970s, she was married to New Orleans longshoreman Earl Harris.

Knight died at a hospital in Tampa, Florida, on November 22, 2023, at the age of 80. Her family released a statement saying: "Beyond touring, recording studios, Ms. Knight loved cooking delicious Creole dishes for family and friends, celebrated Mardi Gras with several local krewes, and proudly served on the Louisiana Music Commission."

== Discography ==
=== Studio albums ===
Year	Album	Peak chart positions		Record label
Year	Album	US	US R&B	Record label
1971	Mr. Big Stuff	60	8	Stax
1981	Keep It Comin (with Premium)	―	―	Cotillion Records
1985	My Toot Toot	181	―	Mirage
1997	Shaki de Boo-Tee	―	―	Ichiban Records
1999	Queen	―	―	ComStar
"—" denotes releases that did not chart or were not released in that territory.

=== Compilation albums ===
Year	Album	Label
1997	『The Very Best of Me』	Aim

=== Singles ===
Year	Single	Label	Chart positions				Album
Year	Single	Label	US Hot 100	US R&B	AUS	South Africa	Album
1964	"The Man That Left Me" "Doggin Around"	Jetstream 706	—	—	—	—	Non-album singles
1964	"Lonesome Tonight" "Love"	Tribe 45-8304	—	—	—	—	Non-album singles
1965	"T'ain't It the Truth" "I'm Glad for Your Sake"	Tribe 45-8304	—	—	—	—	Non-album singles
1965	"Anyone Can Love Him" "A Tear"	Tribe 45-8313	—	—	—	—	Non-album singles
1967	"I Don't Want You No More" "I Have None"	Jetstream 739	—	—	—	—	
1971	"Mr. Big Stuff" "Anyone Can Keep Living These Memories"	Stax STA-0088	2	1	—	—	Mr. Big Stuff
1971	"You Think You're Hot Stuff" "Don't Talk About Jody"	Stax STA-0105	57	19	—	—	Mr. Big Stuff (included on the album as a bonus track after the album's re-release)
1972	"Carry On" "Call Me Your Fool (If You Want To)"	Stax STA-0116	—	44	—	—	Mr. Big Stuff (included on the album as a bonus track after the album's re-release)
1972	"Helping Man" "Pick Up the Pieces"	Stax STA-0138	—	—	—	—	Mr. Big Stuff (included on the album as a bonus track after the album's re-release)
1972	"Do Me" "Save the Last Kiss for Me"	Stax STA-0150	—	—	—	—	Mr. Big Stuff (included on the album as a bonus track after the album's re-release)
1973	"Jesse Joe (You Got to Go)" "Dirt"	Dial D-1026	—	—	—	—	Non-album singles
1975	"Don't Ask for 24 Hours" "Hold Back the Night"	Chelsea CH 3020	—	—	—	—	Non-album singles
1975	"Jesse James Is an Outlaw" "Hold Back the Night"	Chelsea CH 3035	—	—	—	—	Non-album singles
1976	"What One Man Won't Do Another Man Will" "Rudy Blue"	Open 2627	—	—	—	—	Non-album singles
1981	"Anything You Can Do (I Can Do As Well As You)" "Gossip"	Soulin' 1949	—	—	—	—	Keep It Comin'
1981	"You Got the Papers but I Got the Man" "Anything You Can Do (I Can Do as Well as You)" (as Jean Knight & Premium)	Cotillion 46020	—	—	—	—	Keep It Comin'
1983	"La De De - La De Da" (Vocal) "La De De - La De Da" (Instrumental, Sing-A-Long Track)	Soulin' 1953	—	—	—	—	Non-album single
1985	"My Toot Toot" "My Heart Is Willing (and My Body Is Too)"	Mirage 7-99643	50	59	62	3	My Toot Toot
1985	"Let the Good Times Roll" "Magic"	Mirage 7-99606	—	—	—	—	My Toot Toot
1990	"Mama's Baby" (Rap) "Mama's Baby" (Instrumental)	Soulin' 2004	—	—	—	—	Non-album single
1997	"Bill" "Bus Stop"	Ichiban 97-422	—	—	—	—	Shaki De Boo-Tee
"—" denotes releases that did not chart or were not released in that territory.

== See also ==
- List of soul musicians
- List of 1970s one-hit wonders in the United States
- List of artists who reached number one on the Billboard R&B chart
- List of acts who appeared on American Bandstand
- List of people who appeared on Soul Train
