= Midnight Angel (song) =

Single by Barbara Mandrell

from the album Midnight Angel
- B-side: "I Count You"
- Released: November 29, 1976
- Recorded: September 1976
- Genre: Country-pop; Countrypolitan
- Length: 2:48
- Label: ABC; Dot
- Songwriters: Bill Anthony; Bob Morrison
- Producer: Tom Collins

Barbara Mandrell singles chronology
"Love Is Thin Ice" (1976)	"Midnight Angel" (1976)	"Married But Not to Each Other" (1977)

"Midnight Angel" is a song written by Bill Anthony and Bob Morrison, recorded by American country music artist Barbara Mandrell. It was released in November 1976 as the first single and title track from the album Midnight Angel. It reached the top 20 of the American country songs chart.

== Background and recording ==
When Barbara Mandrell made the transition from Columbia Records to ABC/Dot Records, she reached greater commercial success with a new style and sound. This was crafted by producer Tom Collins, who helped bring a Countrypolitan sound that helped her music reach larger audiences. One of the singles she cut during this period was 1976's "Midnight Angel". It was written by Bill Anthony and Bob Morrison. Collins produced the track's recording session in September 1976 in Nashville, Tennessee. The song was described by writers Mary A. Bufwack and Robert K. Oermann as a "cheating song".

== Release and chart performance ==
"Midnight Angel" was released as a single on ABC/Dot Records on November 29, 1976. It was backed on the B-side by the song "I Count You". The track was issued by the label as a seven inch vinyl single. The single spent 12 weeks on America's Billboard country songs chart, peaking at number 16 by February 1977. In Canada, the single climbed to the number 31 position on the RPM country chart. The song was released on Mandrell's second ABC/Dot studio album which was also titled Midnight Angel. The album was also released in November 1976.

== Track listing ==
7" vinyl single

- "Midnight Angel" – 2:48
- "I Count You" – 2:19

7" vinyl single (Denmark)

- "Midnight Angel" – 2:48
- "Slippin' Around Again" – 2:53

== Charts ==
Chart performance for "Midnight Angel"
Chart (1976–1977)	Peak position
Canada Country Songs (RPM)	31
US Hot Country Songs (Billboard)	16
