= Mr. Big Stuff (album) =

Studio album by Jean Knight
- Released: 1971
- Recorded: Malaco Studios (Jackson, Mississippi)
- Genres: Funk, R&B, soul
- Label: Stax
- Producer: Wardell Quezergue

Jean Knight chronology
Mr. Big Stuff (1971)	My Toot Toot (1985)

Mr. Big Stuff
- 1990 reissue cover.

Professional ratings
Review scores
Source	Rating
AllMusic	4.5/5 stars

Mr. Big Stuff is the debut studio album recorded by American singer Jean Knight, released in 1971 on the Stax label.

== Chart performance ==
The album peaked at No. 8 on the R&B Albums Chart. It also reached No. 60 on the Billboard 200. The album features the title track, which peaked at No. 2 on the Billboard Hot 100 and No. 1 on the 1971 Top Soul Singles chart. The album was remastered and reissued on CD with bonus tracks in 1990 by Fantasy Records.

== Track listing ==
Side one
No.	Title	Writer(s)	Length
1.	"Mr. Big Stuff"	Joe Broussard, Ralph Williams, Carrol Washington	2:44
2.	"A Little Bit of Something (Is Better Than All of Nothing)"	Maria Tynes, Joe Broussard	3:28
3.	"Don't Talk About Jody"	Michael Adams, Albert Savoy, Wardell Quezergue	2:43
4.	"Think It Over"	Albert Savoy, Wardell Quezergue	4:47
5.	"Take Him (You Can Have My Man)"	Wardell Quezergue, Maria Tynes, Joe Broussard	2:30

Side two
No.	Title	Writer(s)	Length
6.	"You City Slicker"	Maria Tynes, Joe Broussard, Albert Savoy	2:52
7.	"Why I Keep Living These Memories"	Michael Adams, Joe Broussard	3:02
8.	"Call Me Your Fool (If You Want To)"	Maria Tynes, Albert Savoy, Wardell Quezergue	3:04
9.	"One-Way Ticket to Nowhere (It's the End of the Ride)"	Joe Broussard, Albert Savoy, Wardell Quezergue	4:29
10.	"Your Six-Bit Change"	Maria Tynes, Joe Broussard	2:36

1990 remastered reissue bonus tracks
No.	Title	Writer(s)	Length
11.	"Do Me"	Albert Savoy, Wardell Quezergue	2:50
12.	"Helping Man"	Jean Harris, Ralph Williams	2:52
13.	"Carry On"	Maria Tynes, Wardell Quezergue	2:53
14.	"Save the Last Kiss for Me"	Larry Hamilton	3:24
15.	"Pick Up the Pieces"	Jean Harris, Ralph Williams	2:31
16.	"You Think You're Hot Stuff"	Joe Broussard, Ralph Williams, Carrol Washington	2:29

== Personnel ==
- Wardell Quezergue – piano, organ
- James Stroud – drums, percussion
- Jerry Puckett – guitar
- Vernie Robbins – bass

== Charts ==
Chart (1971)	Peak
Canada RPM 100 Albums	50
U.S. Billboard Top LPs	60
U.S. Billboard Top Soul LPs	8

Singles

Year	Single	Peaks		
Year	Single	US	US R&B	Canada
1971	"Mr. Big Stuff"	2	1	10
1971	"You Think You're Hot Stuff"	57	19	
1972	"Carry On"	—	44	
