= Rosie Ledet =

American musician

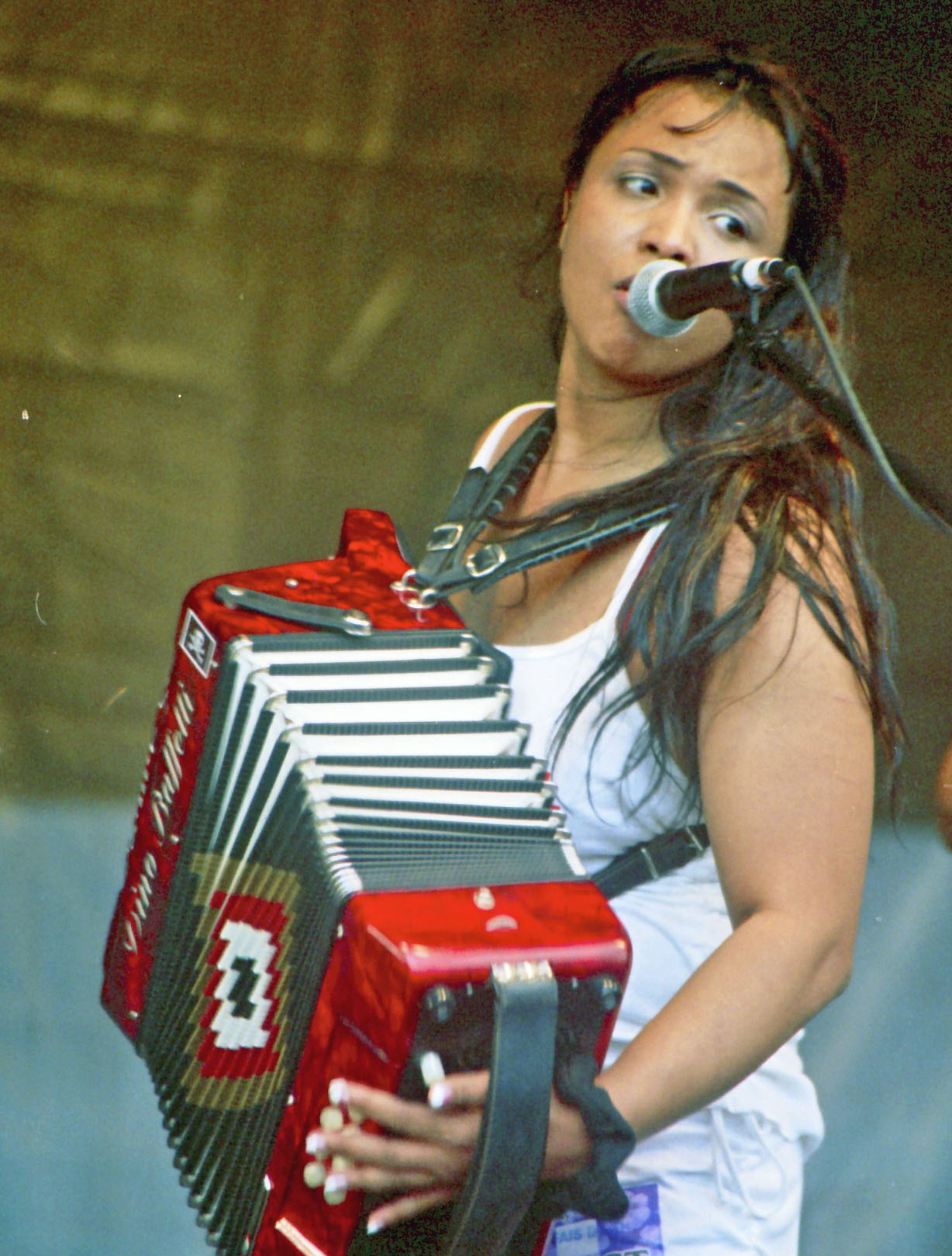
- Ledet at the New Orleans Jazz & Heritage Festival, 2004

Background information
- Also known as: The Zydeco Sweetheart
- Born: Mary Roszela Bellard; October 25, 1971 (age 54); Church Point, Louisiana, U.S.
- Genres: Zydeco
- Occupations: Musician, singer, songwriter
- Instruments: Vocals, accordion
- Years active: 1994–present
- Labels: Maison de Soul, JSP

Rosie Ledet (born Mary Roszela Bellard; October 25, 1971), also known as Rosie Bellard, is an American Creole Zydeco accordion player and singer.

Her songs are known for their sultry and suggestive lyrics. She tours and records with her band, the Zydeco Playboys.

== Biography ==
Born in Church Point, Louisiana, Ledet listened to rock music in her youth. Although she was in an environment where zydeco was heard, she took little interest in the music at the time. She first became fascinated with zydeco music when she was 16 years old. She attended a zydeco dance at Richard's Club, a famous zydeco club in Lawtell, Louisiana, and saw Boozoo Chavis play, which inspired her to start learning to play zydeco. At this dance, she also met Morris Ledet, her husband-to-be.

She learned the accordion watching Morris play. When he heard her, he stepped aside allowing her the spotlight, and became her accompanist on the bass guitar. Morris then brought Rosie to his producer, Mike Lachney, a veteran zydeco producer. Lachney was so impressed that he quickly set up a recording session. Lachney then took Ledet to Floyd Soileau, of the Maison de Soul label. Soileau also was impressed and gave Lachney a contract to produce five albums with Ledet. She started playing around Louisiana and Texas in 1994. The same year, she released her debut album Sweet Brown Sugar on the Maison de Soul label.

She resides in Iota, Louisiana.

== Discography ==
- 1994 Sweet Brown Sugar (Maison de Soul)
- 1995 Zesty Zydeco (Maison de Soul)
- 1997 Zydeco Sensation (Maison de Soul)
- 1999 I'm a Woman (Maison de Soul)
- 2000 It's a Groove Thing! (Maison de Soul)
- 2001 Show Me Something (Maison de Soul)
- 2003 Now's the Time (Maison de Soul)
- 2005 Pick It Up (Maison de Soul)
- 2011 Come Get Some (JSP Records)
- 2013 Slap Your Mama (JSP Records)
- 2015 Raw! (Nizzari Music)

== Awards and honors ==
- 1995: Best of the Beat Awards, Best Emerging Zydeco Band or Performer
- 1995: Best of the Beat Awards, Best Zydeco Vocalist
- 1996: Best of the Beat Awards, Best Emerging Zydeco Band or Performer
- 1996: Best of the Beat Awards, Best Zydeco Band or Performer
- 1996: Best of the Beat Awards, Best Zydeco Vocalist
