= Bébé Carrière =

- Birth name: Joseph Carrière
- Born: 1908; Lawtell, Louisiana, U.S.
- Died: May 6, 2001 (aged 92); Port Arthur, Texas, U.S.
- Genres: la la, zydeco
- Instrument(s): fiddle, vocals
- Labels: Arhoolie, Rounder, Folkways
- Formerly of: The Lawtell Playboys

Joseph "Bébé" Carrière (1908–May 6, 2001) was an American fiddler who was an influential performer and teacher in the genres of Creole la-la music and Cajun music.

== Biography ==
Carrière was born in 1908 in Lawtell, Louisiana. He had four brothers and one sister. His father, Ernest Carrière, played accordion, as did his older brother Eraste.

Carrière started playing fiddle at 13 or 14 years old, using an instrument he crafted out of a cigar box and screen wire. After playing on this instrument, he was able to convince his father to purchase a proper fiddle for him.

Carrière worked as a manual laborer, for example, building Army facilities at Fort Johnson (known then as Fort Polk) near Leesville, Louisiana, building industrial plants near Lake Charles, and farming corn, cotton, and yams. He was contacted by a talent scout early in his career, but declined to do business.

Carrière's compositions, in addition to the Creole tradition, included influences from blues and country music. He particularly enjoyed developing new songs by listening to blues records. However, Carrière mocked the more modern Creole genre, zydeco, jesting in one interview, "They talk about the musicians, and say so-and-so is going to play a number about the zydeco, and I say, they ought to make some about the peas. Yeah, I'm going to get them to try to dance the peas. How about sweet potatoes? Yeah, if I'd have stayed playing, maybe I could have made one about that....".

In 1946, Carrière and his older brother Eraste created a band for playing house parties called the Lawtell Playboys. As young people began going to clubs instead of house parties, the band started playing Saturday nights at Slim's Y-Ki-Ki, a popular zydeco club. Both brothers retired from the band in 1966, but the band continued on with Eraste's son Calvin Carrière on fiddle, and Delton Broussard on accordion.

Bébé and Eraste Carrière recorded as "Les Freres Carrières" with folklorist Nick Spitzer in 1976, released as La La: Louisiana Black French Music the following year. One reviewer has commented, "it's easy to ascertain zydeco's early roots: Afro-Caribbean with its intricate polyrhythms and Eastern European with a mazurka, and 'Robe À Parasol' with very Creole lyrics." The commercial availability of these recordings exposed new audiences to the Carrières' music and to la la generally.

Carrière married twice. His second wife was named Emily. He had five sons and three daughters. He lived in Lawtell for most of his life, but moved near Port Arthur, Texas when he was older. Carrière died of cardiac infarction on May 6, 2001.

== Legacy ==
Bébé Carrière is revered as one of the great Creole, la-la fiddlers, with a musical influence mentioned alongside contemporaries Cajun fiddler Dennis McGee and Creole accordionist Amédé Ardoin.

Bébé Carrière famously taught fiddler Michael Doucet, who became one of the most successful Cajun musicians with his band BeauSoleil.

Carrière's composition "Blue Runner" has become a popular work in the Creole repertoire.

Carrière's son, Andrew Carriere, eventually became an accordionist and bandleader after moving to the San Francisco Bay Area, where he plays with other practitioners of Louisiana music.

== Discography ==
J'étais au Bal: Music from French Louisiana (as The Carriere Brothers)

- Released: 1974
- Format: LP
- Label: Swallow 6020
- Tracks: "La Robe à Parasol," "Blues à Bébé"

La La: Louisiana Black French Music (Les Freres Carrière)

- Released: 1977
- Format: LP
- Label: Folkways Records FA 2622
- Producer: Nick Spitzer
- Tracks: "Zydeco à Carrière," "Robe à Parasol," "Blue Runner," "Blues of the Lonesome Road," "Johnny Peut Pas Danser," "Valse à Cherokee," "Bosco Stomp," "Blues à Bébé"

Zodico - Louisiana Creole Music (Les Freres Carrière)

- Released: 1979
- Format: LP
- Label: Rounder Records 6009
- Tracks: "La-La d'un Pas," "Tu M'as Quitté dans la Porte"

Cajun Fiddle Styles, vol. 1 (Side B - The Carrieres; recorded 1974 in Lawtell)

- Released: 1983
- Format: LP
- Label: Arhoolie Records LP 5031
- Tracks: "Zydeco de Carrière," "Madam Faielle," "Daddy Carrière's Waltz," "Zydeco Sont Pas Sale," "Les Barres de la Prison," "Jolie Catin," "La Robe à Parasol," "Home Sweet Home," "Hey Mom!"

Musique Créole (as The Carrière Brothers)

- Released: 2004
- Format: CD
- Label: Arhoolie Records CD 512
- Tracks: "Zydeco de Carrière", "Planté dans la Port de ma Maison", "Madam Faielle", "Zydeco Sont Pas Sale, Neg", "La Robe à Parasol", "Jolie Catin", "Daddy Carrière's Waltz", "Hey Mom!", "Éraste's Mazuka", "Les Barres de la Prison", "Lake Arthur Stomp", "'Tite Canaille", "Carrière Polka", "Chère Catin Blues", "Colinda", "Johnny Can't Dance", "Blue Runner", "Baby, Please Don't Go", "Bébé's Stomp", "Home Sweet Home"
