= Trapped by a Thing Called Love =

Song by Denise LaSalle
- B-side: "Keep It Coming"
- Released: July 1971
- Recorded: 1971
- Length: 2:43
- Label: Westbound
- Songwriter(s): Denise LaSalle
- Producer(s): Bill Jones

Official Audio
- "Trapped By a Thing Called Love" on YouTube

"Trapped by a Thing Called Love" is a 1971 crossover hit single by Denise LaSalle and was written by LaSalle who also co-produced the song with Bill Jones.

"Trapped by a Thing Called Love" was a gold record and her biggest hit on the US Soul chart where it went to number one, and her only Top 40 pop hit peaking at number thirteen.

== Chart performance ==
Chart (1971)	Peak position
US Billboard Hot 100	13
US Best Selling Soul Singles (Billboard)	1
