= This Is Barbara Mandrell =

1976 album by Barbara Mandrell

Studio album by Barbara Mandrell
- Released: May 3, 1976
- Recorded: c. September 1975—c. February 1976
- Studio: RCA Studio A, Nashville, Tennessee; Bradley's Barn, Mount Juliet, Tennessee
- Genre: Country
- Label: ABC/Dot
- Producer: Tom Collins

Barbara Mandrell chronology
This Time I Almost Made It (1974)	This Is Barbara Mandrell (1976)	Midnight Angel (1976)

Singles from This Is Barbara Mandrell
- 1. "Standing Room Only" Released: December 1, 1975; 2. "That's What Friends Are For" Released: April 12, 1976; 3. "Love Is Thin Ice" Released: July 26, 1976

Professional ratings
Review scores
Source	Rating
Allmusic	2.5/5 stars

This Is Barbara Mandrell is the fourth solo studio album by American country music singer Barbara Mandrell, released in May 1976.

This was Mandrell's first album with ABC/Dot Records, her new record company. Mandrell had previously been signed to Columbia Records from 1969 to 1974, though only achieving modest success, especially with her albums. The first single off this album, "Standing Room Only", became her first Top 5 Country hit. Mandrell had only had four Top 10 hits under her previous record company over the course of five years. Following "Standing Room Only", two further singles were released. The second, "That's What Friends Are For", peaked at #16 and the third, "Love Is Thin Ice", only reached the Top 25. The album sold slightly better than her previous albums had done, peaking farther on the Top Country Albums chart at #26. This album set the stage for Mandrell's eventual success in the following decade, with further Top 10 singles, some of them reaching #1. Unlike most of Barbara's other albums, This Is Barbara Mandrell, consists of 11 tracks instead of 10.

== Track listing ==
1. "That's What Friends Are For" (Ed Penney, Robert Shaw Parsons)
2. "Standing Room Only" (Charles Silver, Susan Manchester)
3. "The Beginning of the End" (Kent Robbins)
4. "Husband Stealer" (Gary Paxton, Gary Paxton Jr.)
5. "She Don't Have to Stop and Rock the Baby" (Danny Hice, Ruby Hice)
6. "Love the Second Time Around" (John Schweers)
7. "Love Is Thin Ice" (Geoffrey Morgan)
8. "Can't Help But Wonder" (Sharon Sanders)
9. "Will We Ever Make Love in Love Again" (Bud Reneau, Sarah Jones)
10. "Mental Revenge" (Mel Tillis)
11. "Just in Case" (Hugh Moffatt)

== Personnel ==
- Barbara Mandrell - lead vocals
- Mike Leech, Steve Schaffer - bass guitar
- Hayward Bishop, Larrie Londin, Kenny Malone - drums
- Jim Buchanan, Johnny Gimble, Tommy Williams - fiddle
- Harold Bradley, Jimmy Capps, Steve Gibson, Glenn Keener, Grady Martin, Billy Sanford, Jerry Shook, Chip Young - guitar
- Charlie McCoy - harmonica
- David Briggs, Ron Oates, Bobby Ogdin, Hargus "Pig" Robbins - piano
- John Hughey, Hal Rugg - steel guitar
- Joe Zinkan - upright bass
- Charlie McCoy, Farrell Morris - vibraphone
- Lea Jane Berinati, Janie Fricke, Herman Harper, The Jordanaires, The Nashville Edition, D. Bergen White - backing vocals
- Archie Jordan - string arrangements (tracks 1,3,5,6)

== Charts ==
Album – Billboard (North America)

Year	Chart	Position
1976	Top Country Albums	#24

Singles – Billboard (North America)

Year	Single	Chart	Position
1975	"Standing Room Only"	Hot Country Singles & Tracks	#5
1976	"That's What Friends Are For	Hot Country Singles & Tracks	#16
1976	"Love Is Thin Ice"	Hot Country Singles & Tracks	#24
