= Lawtell, Louisiana =

- Unincorporated community
- Location within Louisiana Location within the United States
- Coordinates: 30°30′27″N 92°11′04″W
- Country: United States
- State: Louisiana
- Parish: St. Landry

Area
  - Total: 4.15 sq mi (10.74 km^{2})
  - Land: 4.15 sq mi (10.74 km^{2})
  - Water: 0 sq mi (0.00 km^{2})
- Elevation: 62 ft (19 m)

Population (2020)
  - Total: 1,066
  - Density: 257.1/sq mi (99.25/km^{2})
- Time zone: UTC-6 (Central (CST))
  - Summer (DST): UTC-5 (CDT)
- Area code: 337
- GNIS feature ID: 2586692

Lawtell is an unincorporated community and census-designated place in St. Landry Parish, Louisiana, United States. As of the 2020 census, Lawtell had a population of 1,066. The name is a portmanteau of the names of its two founders: Lawler and Littell.

State Representative Dustin Miller is a native of and a businessman in Lawtell.

== Geography ==
According to the U.S. Census Bureau, the community has an area of 4.145 square miles (10.74 km^{2}), all land. U.S. Route 190 passes through the community.

== Demographics ==
Historical population
Census	Pop.	Note	%±
2010	1,198		—
2020	1,066		−11.0%
U.S. Decennial Census

Lawtell first appeared as a census designated place in the 2010 U.S. census.

As of the 2010 United States census, there were 1,198 people living in the CDP. The racial makeup of the CDP was 49.6% Black, 45.1% White, 0.2% Native American, 0.2% Asian, 1.2% from some other race and 1.4% from two or more races. 12.4% were Hispanic or Latino of any race.

== Culture ==
Lawtell was home to Richard's Club, which opened in 1947. It was a venue of the Southern Chitlin' Circuit, particularly as a stop between New Orleans and Houston. Later it became a well known and historically significant zydeco venue. In 2012, Dustin and Nichole Miller purchased the building and reopened it as a dancehall called Miller's Zydeco Hall of Fame. However, in 2017, the building burned down overnight due to arson.

== Notable people ==
- Calvin Carrière (1921-2002), Creole and zydeco fiddler
- Roy Carrier (1947-2010), zydeco accordionist
- Dustin Miller, Louisiana State Representative
