= King Floyd =

American singer (1945–2006)

Background information
- Born: King Floyd III; February 13, 1945; New Orleans, Louisiana, U.S.
- Died: March 6, 2006 (aged 61) Jackson, California, U.S.
- Genres: Soul
- Occupations: Singer; songwriter
- Years active: 1964–2000
- Labels: Malaco, Atlantic, Chess, TK

King Floyd (February 13, 1945 – March 6, 2006) was a New Orleans soul singer, best known for his top 10 hit from 1970, "Groove Me".

== Early career ==
King Floyd III was born in New Orleans in 1945. His musical career started as a singer at the Sho-Bar on Bourbon Street. Following a stint in the army, Floyd went to California, where he joined up with record producer Harold Battiste. His debut album, A Man in Love, featuring songs co-written with Dr. John, failed to make an impact on the charts. Floyd returned to New Orleans in 1969 and worked for the Post Office.

== Recording success ==
In 1970, Wardell Quezergue, an arranger of R&B scores, persuaded Floyd to record "Groove Me" with Malaco Records in Jackson, Mississippi. Jean Knight recorded her hit, "Mr. Big Stuff," in the same sessions.

At first, "Groove Me" was a B-side to another Floyd song, "What Our Love Needs." New Orleans radio DJs started playing "Groove Me" and the song became a local hit. Atlantic Records picked up national distribution of "Groove Me," which topped the United States R&B chart and reached number 6 on the Billboard Hot 100. This disc sold over one million copies, and received a gold disc awarded by the R.I.A.A. in December 1970. Floyd quit his job at the post office to perform a U.S. tour. His follow-up single, "Baby Let Me Kiss You" climbed up to number 29 on the Billboard top 40 charts in 1971.

Differences with Quezergue emerged and his 1973 follow-up album, Think About It, failed to make a commercial impact. However, Atlantic released a song from the album, "Woman Don't Go Astray," as a single. His 1975 album, Well Done, was released through TK Records with Atlantic distributing. "I Feel Like Dynamite" from the album, written by Larry Hamilton, was released as its single. Reviewing the album in Christgau's Record Guide: Rock Albums of the Seventies (1981), Robert Christgau said, "Floyd's quiet, chocolatey voice—cf. Lee Dorsey, Aaron Neville—is prized by seekers after the New Orleans dispensation, but he's never grooved me without skipping like a cheap bootleg. So I'm pleased to report that side one of his fourth LP, climaxing with the neglected regional hit "I Feel Like Dynamite", provides songs as winsome as the straight-ahead Caribbeanisms (even some reggae) of the New Orleans R&B behind. Location of studio: Jackson, Mississippi."

== Subsequent career ==
None of Floyd's subsequent songs achieved the same success, as disco dominated the charts for the remainder of the 1970s. However, Floyd had credits for "Boombastic," recorded in 1995 by Shaggy, which became a big hit. Floyd reunited with Malaco Records in 2000 for the Old Skool Funk album, but it failed to make an impact. However, his song "Don't Leave Me Lonely" was prominently sampled by the Wu-Tang Clan for the song "For Heaven's Sake" on the album Wu-Tang Forever.

== Personal life ==
Floyd died on March 6, 2006, of complications of a stroke and diabetes. He was survived by his wife, children, and grandchildren.

== Discography ==
=== Studio albums ===
Year	Album	Chart positions		Label
Year	Album	US Pop	US R&B	Label
1969	A Man in Love	—	—	Pulsar Records
1971	King Floyd	130	19	Cotillion/Malaco Records
1973	Think About It	—	—	ATCO Records
1975	Well Done	—	—	Chimneyville Records
1977	Body English	—	—	Chimneyville Records
2000	"Old Skool Funk"	—	—	Malaco Records
"—" denotes releases that did not chart.

=== Singles ===
Year	Single	Peak chart positions		
Year	Single	US Pop	US R&B	CAN
1970	"Groove Me"	6	1	11
1970	"Baby Let Me Kiss You"	29	5	69
1970	"Got to Have Your Lovin'"	—	35	—
1972	"Woman Don't Go Astray"	53	3	—
1973	"Think About It"	―	49	—
1973	"So Much Confusion"	―	95	—
1974	"I Feel Like Dynamite"	―	35	—
1974	"Don't Cry No More"	―	96	—
1975	"We Can Love" (with Dorothy Moore)	―	76	—
1977	"Body English"	―	25	—
"—" denotes releases that did not chart.
