= Mr. Big Stuff =

1971 single by Jean Knight

- One of side-A labels of the US single

Single by Jean Knight

from the album Mr. Big Stuff
- B-side: "Why I Keep Living These Memories"
- Released: May 1971
- Recorded: 1970
- Studio: Malaco Studio, Jackson, Mississippi
- Genre: Funk; soul; R&B; pop
- Length: 2:27 (single version): 2:44 (album version)
- Label: Stax; STX 1014
- Songwriters: Joseph Broussard; Carrol Washington; Ralph George Williams
- Producer: Wardell Quezergue

Jean Knight singles chronology
"Mr. Big Stuff" (1971)	"You Think You're Hot" (1971)

Official audio
- "Mr. Big Stuff" on YouTube

"Mr. Big Stuff" is a song by American singer Jean Knight. The song was released in 1971 on the Stax label as a single from Knight's debut album of the same title, and became a big hit in the US, reaching No. 2 on Billboard Hot 100. The song was certified double platinum and was the No. 1 Soul Single of the year.

== Background ==
"Mr. Big Stuff" was recorded in 1970 at Malaco Studio in Jackson, Mississippi, at the same session as "Groove Me" by King Floyd. Knight's single was released by Stax Records because of the persistence of Stax publisher Tim Whitsett; "Groove Me" by King Floyd, which Whitsett strongly urged Malaco to release, also became a hit. Both songs are defined by two bar, off-beat bass lines and tight arrangements by Wardell Quezergue.

Released on Knight's 1971 debut album of the same title, it became a huge crossover hit. The song spent five weeks at No. 1 on the Billboard Soul Singles chart and peaked at No. 2 on the Billboard Hot 100 Singles chart, behind "How Can You Mend a Broken Heart" by The Bee Gees. Billboard ranked it as the No. 18 song for 1971. The song went double platinum and was the No. 1 Soul Single of the year.

Knight performed the song on Soul Train on December 11, 1971, during its first season. "Mr. Big Stuff" became one of Stax Records' more popular and recognizable hits. It was featured in the 2007 mini-series The Bronx Is Burning. It was nominated for Best Female R&B Vocal Performance at the 1972 Grammy Awards.

The song is addressed to an egotistical man, nicknamed Mr. Big Stuff, by an indignant female narrator. The man, who has expensive cars and fancy clothes, breaks other girls' hearts. The narrator demands he act more maturely and return her love for him. This song features a backup female chorus intoning "Oh Yeah" once in the song's Intro, twice in the first verse, and twice in the third verse.

== Charts ==
=== Weekly charts ===
Chart (1971)	Peak position
Canada Top Singles (RPM)	10
US Billboard Hot 100	2
U.S. Billboard Soul	1
U.S. Cash Box Top 100	2

=== Year-end charts ===
Chart (1971)	Rank
Canada	94
U.S. Billboard Hot 100	18
U.S. Soul Singles (Billboard)	1
U.S. Cash Box Top 100	42

== Certifications ==
Region	Certification	Certified units/sales
United Kingdom (BPI)	Silver	200,000^{‡}
United States (RIAA)	2× Platinum	2,000,000^{^}
^{^} Shipments figures based on certification alone.^{‡} Sales+streaming figures based on certification alone.

== Personnel ==
No credits are listed for the Malaco studio musicians on the record. According to Rob Bowman's liner notes from the 1999 box set The Last Soul Company: Malaco, A Thirty Year Retrospective, the musicians for this session included:

- Vernie Robbins – bass
- James Stroud – drums
- Paul Davis - Keyboards and horn arrangements.
- Wardell Quezergue – organ
- Jerry Puckett – guitar
- Jimmy Honeycutt – saxophone
- Bob Cheesman – trumpet
- Ed Seay – Engineer

However, during this time at Malaco, horn lines were typically played by saxophonist Hugh Garraway and trumpeter Peary Lomax. Lomax has said he played all trumpet parts on this record and on "Groove Me."

== Cover versions ==
- American all-female heavy metal band Precious Metal released a cover of the song from their self-titled 1990 album. Donald Trump, businessman and future president of the United States, originally made an appearance in the music video for the band's cover. However, Trump wanted a $250,000 payment instead of the agreed-upon $10,000 appearance fee. After the band refused to pay for his appearance, Trump was replaced in the final version of the music video.
- Martha Wash for the soundtrack of Disney's 1994 film D2: The Mighty Ducks.
- Canadian singer Sheree Jeacocke on her 1995 EP Jeacocke.
- R&B duo Nikki & Rich for the 2011 film Hop.
- Britta Phillips, as the character Billy, in the 1988 movie Satisfaction.
- The 2005 movie Kinky Boots and the 2025 movie Fixed featured a rendition by American soul singer Lyn Collins.
- On the March 29, 2014 episode, the female cast members of Saturday Night Live performed "Mr. Big Stuff" for a sketch with guest host Louis C.K.
- John Holt recorded a reggae version in 1971, changing the lyrics to "Sister Big Stuff". Prince Buster would record his own version the following year.

== Sampling ==
- In 1987, rapper Heavy D recorded "Mr. Big Stuff", which also became a hit. Though his version was entirely different from the original, Knight's hook line ("Mr. Big Stuff, who do you think you are?") was prominently featured throughout the song.
- In 1994, the song was prominently interpolated into TLC's "Switch" on their CrazySexyCool album.
- A sample of the composition was used for the self-titled song by Queen Latifah, Shades and Free, which was included on the soundtrack of the 1996 movie The Associate.
- "Mr. Big Stuff" was sampled in 2000 by Everclear in the song "AM Radio" from their album Songs from an American Movie Vol. One: Learning How to Smile.
- Girl Talk sampled a portion on his track, "Let It Out" from the album All Day
- Beastie Boys sampled the famous "Who do you think you are?" lyric in their song "Johnny Ryall" from Paul's Boutique.
- R&B and soul artist John Legend sampled "Mr. Big Stuff" for the lead single "Who Do We Think We Are" (featuring Rick Ross) from his fourth album Love in the Future (2013).
- Eazy-E sampled this song for the 1987 single "Boyz-n-the-Hood" off the EP and the compilation album N.W.A. and the Posse.

== See also ==
- List of 1970s one-hit wonders in the United States
