= Denise LaSalle =

American singer (1934–2018)

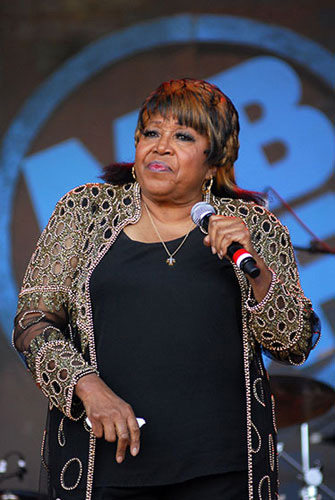
- LaSalle performing at the 2009 Monterey Bay Blues Festival

Background information
- Also known as: Denise Craig, Denise Jones
- Born: Ora Denise Allen; July 16, 1934; The Island, Leflore County, Mississippi, U.S.
- Died: January 8, 2018 (aged 83) Jackson, Tennessee, U.S.
- Genres: Blues, R&B, soul, disco
- Occupation: Singer
- Years active: 1967–2018

Ora D. Allen (July 16, 1934 – January 8, 2018), known by the stage name Denise LaSalle, was an American blues, R&B and soul singer, songwriter, and record producer who, after the death of Koko Taylor, was acknowledged as the "Queen of the Blues". Her husband was rapper Super Wolf.

LaSalle's best-known songs were "Trapped by a Thing Called Love", "My Toot-Toot", "I'm So Hot" and "Down Home Blues".

== Early life ==
LaSalle, the youngest of eight children, was born Ora D. (or Ora Dee) Allen on July 16, 1934, near Sidon, Mississippi in an area then known as The Island, to Nathaniel A. Allen Sr. and Nancy Cooper. Her family worked as sharecroppers, and she had to pick cotton and take up other paid labor to support her family.

She was raised in Belzoni from age seven and sang in church choirs for local gospel groups around Leflore County. At age 13, she moved to Chicago to live with her oldest brother.

== Career ==
She sat in with R&B musicians and wrote songs, influenced by country music as well as the blues. Around 1963, while she was working as barmaid at the Mix's Lounge, she met Billy "The Kid" Emerson, who at that time was working for Chess Records. This resulted in a one year recording contract with Chess; however, no recording sessions were done. Later on Emerson started his own label, Tarpon, and in 1967 he recorded LaSalle on his label. The single, "A Love Reputation", was a modest regional hit.

She established an independent production company, Crajon, with her then husband Bill Jones. Her song "Trapped By a Thing Called Love" (1971) was released on Detroit-based Westbound Records. This reached #1 on the national R&B chart and #13 on the Billboard Hot 100 chart. The song ranked at #85 on the 1971 year-end chart. A RIAA gold disc award was made on November 30, 1971 for a million sales. Reviewing her 1972 debut album of the same name, Robert Christgau wrote in Christgau's Record Guide: Rock Albums of the Seventies (1981): "LaSalle seems to be a songwriter first and a singer second, which may be why there's a certain professional anonymity about her unusual moods. But the voice is there—sensual, warm, even wise, ideal for [producer] Willie Mitchell's meditative Memphis funk. And because she's a pretty good songwriter, just about every one of these twelve tracks offers its professional pleasures."

She also wrote successful follow-ups, "Now Run and Tell That" and "Man Sized Job", which made #3 and number 4 in the R&B top ten and also charted in the Hot 100. Her early hits were recorded at the Hi recording studios in Memphis, operated by Mitchell, using the best southern session players. She continued to have hits and made three albums on the Westbound label.

In 1976, she moved to Jackson, Tennessee and signed a contract with ABC Records. On ABC she had another hit, "Love Me Right" (#10 R&B, #80 pop). ABC was taken over by MCA, and LaSalle made three albums for MCA. Her 1979 album, "Unwrapped" included a cover of Rod Stewart's "Do Ya Think I'm Sexy". In 1980, she released the "I'm So Hot" album which included another hit song she wrote, "Try My Love", which enjoyed considerable disco/dance club play in 1980. Super Wolf recorded rap song "Super Wolf Can Do It" also. She continued to perform live and to produce. Her co-penned song "Married, But Not to Each Other" was included on the 1979 compilation album The Best of Barbara Mandrell.

In 1982, LaSalle signed as songwriter for the Malaco label, where she wrote songs for Z.Z. Hill among others. She was then persuaded to also record herself; this resulted in the album Lady in the Street in 1983. She continued to record for Malaco for 15 years, and released a string of critically acclaimed albums, starting with Lady in the Street (1983) and Right Place, Right Time (1984). Her R&B, soul blues, and soul songs were played on urban radio stations in southern states. In 1985, she enjoyed her only recognition in the UK Singles Chart when her cover version of Rockin' Sidney's "My Toot Toot" reached #6.

She appeared at the 1984 and 1993 versions of the Long Beach Blues Festival. In 1993, she also performed at the San Francisco Blues Festival. Her album, Smokin' in Bed (1997), sold well.

LaSalle has in interviews stated that during the Westbound and ABC/MCA years she was free to record any song she liked, but at Malaco she was more limited. Malaco was a blues label, and wanted her to record mainly 'hard blues'.

After the Malaco years, LaSalle started her own label Ordena, and released a few albums, including God's Got My Back which is a gospel album, and This Real Woman (2-CD set) which is a mixture of everything, it includes country, R&B, blues and pop.

In 2002, LaSalle was again recording for a new label, this time for Ecko Records, a small Memphis-based soul-blues label, the first album was Still the Queen.

After more than a decade away, she returned to Malaco to release an album in 2010, titled 24 Hour Woman.

In 2011, she was inducted into the Blues Hall of Fame.

LaSalle lived with her husband, James E. Wolfe, in Jackson, where she opened a restaurant called Blues Legend Café. The restaurant was located at 436 E. Main Street, but has since closed.

== Personal life and death ==
LaSalle married Artic Craig, a co-worker of her brother A.J. at Campbell Soup, in 1956 when she was 22. LaSalle and Craig were together for only a short time, but did not formally end the marriage until right before she married her second husband, Bill Jones, in 1969. She and Jones divorced in 1974. Both of them collaborated in producing records, and they established an independent production company, Crajon Records. In 1977, she married James E. "Super Wolfe" Wolfe Jr. He was a disc jockey, ran several radio stations, became a preacher, and died in 2022. LaSalle had two children.

After suffering from heart problems, and with complications from a fall having resulted in her right leg being amputated in October 2017, LaSalle died surrounded by her family, at the age of 83, on January 8, 2018.

== Legacy ==
In 2009, LaSalle was honored with a marker on the Mississippi Blues Trail in Belzoni. In 2013 and 2014, she was nominated for a Blues Music Award in the 'Soul Blues Female Artist' category. On June 6, 2015, LaSalle was inducted into the Rhythm and Blues Music Hall of Fame.

== Discography ==
=== Studio and live albums ===
Year	Title	Chart positions		
Year	Title	US	US R&B	US Blues
1967	A Love Reputation	—	—	—
1971	Craving for You	—	—	—
1972	Trapped by a Thing Called Love	120	38	—
1973	On the Loose	—	46	—
1975	Here I Am Again	—	—	—
1976	Second Breath	—	—	—
1977	The Bitch Is Bad!	—	47	—
1978	Under the Influence	—	58	—
1978	Shot of Love	—	—	—
1979	Unwrapped	—	46	—
1980	I'm So Hot	—	—	—
1981	And Satisfaction Guaranteed	—	—	—
1983	A Lady in the Street	—	23	—
1984	Right Place, Right Time	—	38	—
1985	Love Talkin'	—	67	—
1986	Rain & Fire	—	48	—
1987	It's Lying Time Again	—	—	—
1988	Hittin' Where It Hurts	—	61	—
1990	Still Trapped	—	27	—
1992	Love Me Right	—	73	—
1994	Still Bad	—	—	—
1997	Smokin' in Bed	—	69	10
1999	God's Got My Back	—	—	—
2000	This Real Woman	—	—	—
2001	There's No Separation	—	—	—
2002	Still the Queen	—	—	—
2004	Wanted	—	—	—
2007	Pay Before You Pump	—	—	14
2010	24 Hour Woman	—	—	—
2019	Mississippi Woman Steppin' Out Live!	—	—	—
"—" denotes releases that did not chart.

=== Compilation albums ===
- 1973: Doin' It Right
- 1985: My Toot Toot
- 1989: Holdin' Hands with the Blues
- 2001: I Get What I Want: Best of the ABC/MCA Years
- 2003: My Toot Toot: The Definitive Anthology
- 2013: Making A Good Thing Better - The Complete Westbound Singles 1970-76

=== Singles ===
Year	Title	Chart positions			
Year	Title	US	US R&B	US Dance	UK
1967	"A Love Reputation"	—	—	—	—
1968	"Private Property"	—	—	—	—
1968	"Count Down (And Fly Me to the Moon)"	—	—	—	—
1970	"Too Late to Check Your Trap"	—	—	—	—
1970	"Heartbreaker of the Year"	—	—	—	—
1971	"Trapped by a Thing Called Love"	13	1	—	—
1972	"Now Run and Tell That"	46	3	—	—
1972	"A Man Sized Job"	55	4	—	—
1973	"What It Takes to Get a Good Woman"	—	31	—	—
1973	"Your Man and Your Best Friend"	—	92	—	—
1973	"Don't Nobody Live Here (By the Name of Fool)"	—	67	—	—
1974	"Get Up Off My Mind"	—	96	—	—
1974	"Trying to Forget"	—	—	—	—
1975	"My Brand on You"	—	55	—	—
1975	"Here I Am Again"	—	—	—	—
1976	"Married, But Not to Each Other"	102	16	—	—
1976	"Hellfire Loving"	—	—	—	—
1977	"Freedom to Express Yourself"	—	100	17	—
1977	"Love Me Right"	80	10	—	—
1978	"One Life to Live"	—	87	—	—
1978	"Workin' Overtime"	—	70	—	—
1979	"P.A.R.T.Y. (Where It Is)"	—	90	—	—
1979	"Think About It"	—	—	—	—
1980	"I'm So Hot"	—	82	33	—
1980	"Try My Love"	—	—	—	—
1981	"I'm Trippin' on You"	—	—	—	—
1981	"I'll Get You Some Help"	—	—	—	—
1983	"A Lady in the Street"	—	—	—	—
1983	"Lay Me Down"	—	—	—	—
1983	"Down Home Blues"	—	—	—	—
1984	"Right Place, Right Time"	—	—	—	—
1984	"Treat Your Man Like a Baby"	—	—	—	—
1985	"My Toot Toot"	—	79	—	6
1985	"Santa Claus Got the Blues"	—	—	—	—
1986	"What's Going On in My House"	—	—	—	—
1986	"Let the Four Winds Blow"	—	—	—	—
1987	"Hold What You've Got"	—	—	—	—
1989	"Don't Cry No More"	—	—	—	—
1989	"Bring It On Home to Me"	—	—	—	—
1989	"I Forgot to Remember"	—	—	—	—
1990	"Drop That Zero"	—	—	—	—
1992	"Don't Jump My Pony"	—	—	—	—
1992	"When We're Making Love"	—	—	—	—
1995	"Right Side of the Wrong Bed"	—	—	—	—
2001	"There's No Separation"	—	—	—	—
"—" denotes releases that did not chart or were not released in that territory.
