= Dustin Miller =

American politician

Member of the Louisiana House of Representatives from the 40th district
- Incumbent
- Assumed office January 11, 2016
- Preceded by: Ledricka Thierry

Personal details
- Party: Democratic
- Education: University of Louisiana at Lafayette

Dustin Miller is a Democratic member of the Louisiana House of Representatives. He has represented District 40 in St. Landry Parish since January 2016. Miller was re-elected in 2023, garnering 81% of the vote against challenger Allen Guidry's 19% of the vote.
