= Rosanne Cash discography =

Cataloging of published recordings by Rosanne Cash

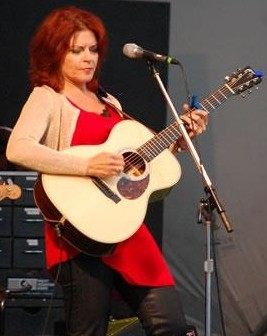
- Rosanne Cash performing at the Vancouver Folk Music Festival, 2011.
- Studio albums: 14
- Compilation albums: 6
- Singles: 39
- Video albums: 1
- Music videos: 14

The discography of Rosanne Cash, an American singer-songwriter, consists of 14 studio albums, six compilation albums, and 39 singles. The daughter of Johnny Cash, Rosanne Cash recorded her self-titled debut album in 1978 under the German label Ariola. After signing with Columbia Records in 1979, Cash's second studio album Right or Wrong was released. Its lead single "No Memories Hangin' Around" (a duet with Bobby Bare) reached the Top 20 on the Billboard Hot Country Songs chart. Cash's third studio release, Seven Year Ache (1981), gained major success when the title track peaked at number one on the Billboard Country chart. It was then followed by "My Baby Thinks He's a Train" and "Blue Moon with a Heartache," which also reached the top spot. The album's follow-up effort, Somewhere in the Stars (1982) produced three Top 20 hits on the Billboard chart.

After a three-year hiatus, Cash issued Rhythm & Romance in 1985. It topped the Billboard Top Country Albums list and spawned four Top 10 singles. Among them was the number one song, "I Don't Know Why You Don't Want Me," which won the Grammy Award for Best Female Country Vocal Performance in 1986. Her sixth album, King's Record Shop was released in 1987. The album peaked at number six on the country albums chart and certified gold in the United States. The four singles released by King's Record Shop all reached number one on the Billboard Country chart between 1987 and 1988, including a cover of her father, Johnny Cash's "Tennessee Flat-Top Box."

In 1990, Cash released her seventh studio recording, Interiors, which gained critical acclaim from music critics, but only produced one Top 40 single, "What We Really Want." Her next release, The Wheel (1993) was Cash's final release for Columbia and did not spawn any major hits. In 1996, 10 Song Demo, an eleven-track album of demo recordings, was released on Capitol Records. Cash returned to recording in 2003 with her eleventh studio release, Rules of Travel, produced by her husband, John Leventhal on Capitol. It was followed by 2006's Black Cadillac, which reflected upon the deaths of her father, her mother, and stepmother. In October 2009, she issued her thirteenth studio release, The List, which was based on a personal list given to her by her father that he considered to be the "one hundred essential country songs." Her fourteenth studio album, The River & the Thread was released in January 2014, which debuted at number two on the country albums chart and number 11 on the Billboard 200. It was followed in 2018 by She Remembers Everything.

== Albums ==
=== Studio albums ===
List of albums, with selected chart positions and certifications, showing other relevant details
Title	Album details	Peak chart positions									Certifications
Title	Album details	US	US Cou.	US Folk	US Rock	CAN	GER	NOR	SWE	UK	Certifications
Rosanne Cash	Released: December 1978; Label: Ariola; Formats: LP	—	—	—	—	—	—	—	—	—	
Right or Wrong	Released: February 1980; Label: Columbia; Formats: LP, cassette	—	42	—	—	—	—	—	—	—	
Seven Year Ache	Released: February 1981; Label: Columbia; Formats: LP, cassette, CD	26	1	—	—	—	—	—	—	—	RIAA: Gold
Somewhere in the Stars	Released: June 1982; Label: Columbia; Formats: LP, cassette	76	6	—	—	—	—	—	—	—	
Rhythm & Romance	Released: May 1985; Label: Columbia; Formats: LP, cassette, CD	101	1	—	—	—	—	—	—	—	
King's Record Shop	Released: June 26, 1987; Label: Columbia; Formats: LP, cassette, CD	138	6	—	—	57	—	—	—	—	RIAA: Gold
Interiors	Released: October 5, 1990; Label: Columbia; Formats: LP, cassette, CD	175	23	—	—	—	—	—	—	—	
The Wheel	Released: January 19, 1993; Label: Columbia; Formats: Cassette, CD	160	37	—	—	—	—	—	—	—	
10 Song Demo	Released: April 2, 1996; Label: Capitol; Formats: Cassette, CD	—	—	—	—	—	—	—	—	—	
Rules of Travel	Released: March 25, 2003; Label: Capitol; Formats: CD	130	16	—	—	—	—	—	—	—	
Black Cadillac	Released: January 24, 2006; Label: Capitol; Formats: CD, music download	78	18	—	22	—	—	—	—	—	
The List	Released: October 6, 2009; Label: Manhattan; Formats: LP, CD, music download	22	5	2	8	—	88	39	19	143	
The River & the Thread	Released: January 14, 2014; Label: Blue Note; Formats: LP, CD, music download	11	2	1	—	—	—	4	—	18	
She Remembers Everything	Release date: November 2, 2018; Label: Blue Note; Formats: LP, CD, music download	172	16	5	30	—	—	—	—	—	
"—" denotes a recording that did not chart or was not released in that territory.

=== Compilation albums ===
List of compilation albums, with selected chart positions and certifications, showing other relevant details
Title	Album details	Peak chart positions				Certifications
Title	Album details	US	US Cou.	CAN	CAN Cou.	Certifications
Hits 1979–1989	Released: February 28, 1989; Label: Columbia; Formats: LP, cassette, CD	152	8	54	10	RIAA: Gold
Retrospective	Released: November 7, 1995; Label: Columbia; Formats: Cassette, CD	—	—	—	—	
The Country Side	Released: May 13, 1996; Label: Sony Special Products; Formats: Cassette, CD	—	—	—	—	
Super Hits	Released: February 17, 1998; Label: Columbia; Formats: Cassette, CD	—	—	—	—	
The Very Best of Rosanne Cash	Released: November 8, 2005; Label: Columbia/Legacy; Formats: CD, music download	—	—	—	—	
The Essential Rosanne Cash	Released: May 24, 2011; Label: Columbia, Legacy; Formats: CD, music download	—	64	—	—	
"—" denotes a recording that did not chart or was not released in that territory.

== Singles ==
=== As lead artist ===
List of singles, with selected chart positions and other relevant details
Title	Year	Peak chart positions				Album
Title	Year	US	US Cou.	US AC	CAN Cou.	Album
"So Fine"	1978	—	—	—	—	Rosanne Cash
"Thoughts from a Train"	1978	—	—	—	—	Rosanne Cash
"No Memories Hangin' Round" (with Bobby Bare)	1979	—	17	—	38	Right or Wrong
"Couldn't Do Nothin' Right"	1980	—	15	—	26	Right or Wrong
"Take Me, Take Me"	1980	—	25	—	60	Right or Wrong
"Seven Year Ache"	1981	22	1	6	6	Seven Year Ache
"My Baby Thinks He's a Train"	1981	—	1	—	4	Seven Year Ache
"Blue Moon with Heartache"	1981	— (Note: "Blue Moon with Heartache" did not enter the Hot 100, but peaked at number 4 on Bubbling Under Hot 100 Singles, which acts as a 25-song extension of the Hot 100.)	1	37	2	Seven Year Ache
"Ain't No Money"	1982	—	4	—	5	Somewhere in the Stars
"I Wonder"	1982	—	8	—	14	Somewhere in the Stars
"It Hasn't Happened Yet"	1983	—	14	—	—	Somewhere in the Stars
"I Don't Know Why You Don't Want Me"	1985	—	1	16	5	Rhythm & Romance
"Never Be You"	1985	—	1	—	2	Rhythm & Romance
"Hold On"	1986	—	5	36	6	Rhythm & Romance
"Second to No One"	1986	—	5	—	4	Rhythm & Romance
"The Way We Make a Broken Heart"	1987	—	1	—	1	King's Record Shop
"Tennessee Flat Top Box"	1987	—	1	—	1	King's Record Shop
"If You Change Your Mind"	1988	—	1	—	1	King's Record Shop
"Runaway Train"	1988	—	1	—	2	King's Record Shop
"I Don't Want to Spoil the Party"	1989	—	1	—	1	Hits 1979–1989
"Black and White"	1989	—	37	—	66	Hits 1979–1989
"What We Really Want"	1990	—	39	—	24	Interiors
"On the Surface"	1991	—	69	—	63	Interiors
"Real Woman"	1991	—	—	—	—	Interiors
"Seventh Avenue"	1993	—	—	—	63	The Wheel
"The Wheel"	1993	—	—	45	—	The Wheel
"Rules of Travel"	2003	—	—	—	—	Rules of Travel
"September When It Comes" (featuring Johnny Cash)	2003	—	—	—	—	Rules of Travel
"Black Cadillac"	2005	—	—	—	—	Black Cadillac
"House on the Lake"	2006	—	—	—	—	Black Cadillac
"Radio Operator"	2006	—	—	—	—	Black Cadillac
"Sea of Heartbreak" (featuring Bruce Springsteen)	2009	—	—	—	—	The List
"Modern Blue"	2013	—	—	—	—	The River & the Thread
"The Sunken Lands"	2014	—	—	—	—	The River & the Thread
"The Walking Wounded"	2018	—	—	—	—	Forever Words
"Crawl Into the Promised Land"	2020	—	—	—	—	—N/a
"—" denotes a recording that did not chart or was not released in that territory.

=== As a featured artist ===
List of featured singles, with selected chart positions and other relevant details
Title	Year	Peak chart positions			Album
Title	Year	US Cou.	CAN Cou.	U.S. Triple A	Album
"If It Weren't for Him" (Vince Gill with Rosanne Cash)	1985	10	5	—	The Things That Matter
"It's Such a Small World" (Rodney Crowell with Rosanne Cash)	1988	1	1	—	Diamonds & Dirt
"Ballad of a Teenage Queen" (Johnny Cash with Rosanne Cash and The Everly Brothers)	1989	45	—	—	Water from the Wells of Home
"One Step Over the Line" (Nitty Gritty Dirt Band with Rosanne Cash and John Hiatt)	1990	63	47	—	Will the Circle Be Unbroken: Volume Two
"Got You Covered" (Blackie and the Rodeo Kings featuring Rosanne Cash)	2011	—	—	—	Kings and Queens
"It Ain't Over Yet" (Rodney Crowell featuring Rosanne Cash and John Paul White)	2017	—	—	—	Close Ties
"Put a Woman in Charge" (Keb' Mo' featuring Rosanne Cash)	2018	—	—	—	Oklahoma
"Crumble" (The National with Rosanne Cash)	2023	—	—	28	Laugh Track
"—" denotes a recording that did not chart or was not released in that territory.

== Videography ==
=== Video albums ===
List of video albums, showing release information
Title	Album details
Interiors Live	Release date: July 1, 1991; Label: Sony Music Entertainment; Formats: VHS
Retrospective	Release date: 1989; Label: CMV Enterprises / Image; Format: Laserdisc

=== Music videos ===
List of music videos, showing year released and director
Title	Year	Director(s)	Ref.
"Seven Year Ache"	1981	—N/a	
"Blue Moon with Heartache"	1981	—N/a	
"I Wonder"	1982	Michael Nesmith	
"I Don't Know Why You Don't Want Me"	1985	Wayne Isham	
"Second to No One"	1986	Richard Levine, Ken Ross	
"The Way We Make a Broken Heart"	1987	Bill Pope	
"Tennessee Flat Top Box"	1987	Bill Pope	
"It's Such a Small World" (with Rodney Crowell)	1988	Edd Griles	
"Runaway Train"	1988	Bill Pope	
"What We Really Want"	1990	Ethan Russell	
"On the Surface"	1991	Bill Pope	
"The Wheel"	1993	Mary Lambert	
"September When It Comes" (featuring Johnny Cash)	2003	Danny Kahn	
"I'm Movin' On"	2009	DJ Mendel	
"It Ain't Over Yet" (with Rodney Crowell and John Paul White)	2017	Reid Long	

== Album appearances ==
Year	Song	Album
1974	"Broken Freedom Song"	Junkie and the Juicehead Minus Me
1982	"Innocent Eyes"	Dreams in Stone
1984	"Nobody Sees Me Like You Do"	Every Man Has a Woman
1985	"If It Weren't for Him" (with Vince Gill)	The Things That Matter
1988	"It's Such a Small World" (with Rodney Crowell)	Diamonds & Dirt
1989	"One Step Over the Line" (with Nitty Gritty Dirt Band and John Hiatt)	Will the Circle Be Unbroken: Volume Two
1990	"It Came Upon the Midnight Clear"	Acoustic Christmas
1992	"Carrie"	'Til Their Eyes Shine (The Lullaby Album)
1992	"Women" (with John Stewart)	Bullets in the Hour Glass
1993	"You Ain't Going Nowhere" (with Mary Chapin Carpenter and Shawn Colvin)	The 30th Anniversary Concert Celebration
1994	"Cry of a Tiny Babe" (with Bruce Cockburn, Lou Reed and Rob Wasserman)	The Best of the Columbia Records Radio Hour, Volume 1
1994	"What We Really Want" (with David Byrne, John Leventhal and Zev Katz)	The Best of the Columbia Records Radio Hour, Volume 1
1994	"Wouldn't It Be Lovely" (with John Leventhal)	The Best of the Columbia Records Radio Hour, Volume 1
1995	"River"	Spirit of '73: Rock for Choice
1995	"I Count the Tears"	Till the Night Is Gone: A Tribute to Doc Pomus
1998	"D-I-V-O-R-C-E"	Tammy Wynette Remembered
1998	"Who's Dreaming Who" (with Jules Shear)	Between Us
2000	"Hometown Blues"	Singin' with Emmylou, Vol. 1
2001	"I Found Love" (with Vince Gill and Earl Scruggs)	Earl Scruggs and Friends
2001	"Seven Year Ache" (Trisha Yearwood featuring Rosanne Cash)	Inside Out
2001	"Fair and Tender Ladies"	Songcatcher (soundtrack)
2002	"I Still Miss Someone"	Kindred Spirits: A Tribute to the Songs of Johnny Cash
2007	"Wings of Angels"	Anchored in Love: A Tribute to June Carter Cash
2007	"The Unfaithful Servant"	Endless Highway: The Music of The Band
2017	"It Ain't Over Yet" (with Rodney Crowell and John Paul White)	Close Ties
2018	"This Train Don't Stop There Anymore" (with Emmylou Harris)	Restoration: Reimagining the Songs of Elton John and Bernie Taupin
2023	"Crumble" (with The National)	Laugh Track
