= The Very Best of Rosanne Cash =

Greatest hits album by Rosanne Cash
- Released: November 8, 2005
- Recorded: 1979–2003
- Genre: Country
- Label: Columbia
- Producer: Original recordings: Rodney Crowell, Rosanne Cash, John Leventhal, Jimmy Iovine, David Malloy; Compilation: Jerry Rappaport

Rosanne Cash chronology
Rules of Travel (2003)	The Very Best of Rosanne Cash (2005)	Black Cadillac (2006)

Professional ratings
Review scores
Source	Rating
AllMusic	4/5 stars

The Very Best of Rosanne Cash is the third compilation album by Rosanne Cash. It was released on November 8, 2005, by Columbia Records. The album contains 14 singles that Cash released with Columbia from 1979 to 1996, along with her 2003 single "September When It Comes" from Rules of Travel; featuring a duet with her father Johnny Cash, and a previously unreleased version of "Never Be You".

== Track listing ==
All tracks composed by Rosanne Cash; except where indicated

1. "The Wheel" – 4:20 - from The Wheel (1993)
2. "The Way We Make a Broken Heart" (John Hiatt) 3:54 - from King's Record Shop (1987)
3. "Seven Year Ache" – 3:16 - from Seven Year Ache (1981)
4. "Hold On" – 3:38 - from Rhythm & Romance (1985)
5. "On the Surface" (Rosanne Cash, Jimmy Tittle) – 2:57 - from Interiors (1990)
6. "No Memories Hangin' Round" (Rodney Crowell) – 3:26 - from Right or Wrong (1980)
7. "My Baby Thinks He's a Train" (Preston) – 3:14
8. "I Don't Know Why You Don't Want Me" (Rosanne Cash, Rodney Crowell) – 3:19
9. "Blue Moon with Heartache" – 4:28
10. "Western Wall" – 3:02 - from 10 Song Demo (1996)
11. "Tennessee Flat Top Box" (Johnny Cash) – 3:16
12. "September When It Comes" (Rosanne Cash, John Leventhal) – 3:41 - from Rules of Travel (2003)
13. "Sleeping in Paris" – 4:07
14. "Never Be You" (Tom Petty, Benmont Tench) – 3:38
15. "What We Really Want" – 3:31
16. "Seventh Avenue" (Rosanne Cash, John Leventhal) – 5:11
