= Hits 1979–1989 =

Compilation album by Rosanne Cash
- Released: February 28, 1989
- Genre: Country
- Length: 40:35
- Label: Columbia
- Producer: Rodney Crowell, David Malloy, Rosanne Cash

Rosanne Cash chronology
King's Record Shop (1987)	Hits 1979–1989 (1989)	Interiors (1990)

Singles from Hits 1979-1989
- 1. "I Don't Want to Spoil the Party" Released: February 1989; 2. "Black and White" Released: August 1989

Professional ratings
Review scores
Source	Rating
Allmusic	link

Hits 1979–1989 is a compilation album by American singer Rosanne Cash, released in 1989. It peaked at No. 8 on the Billboard Top Country Albums charts and No. 152 on The Billboard 200. In February 1995 the album was certified Gold by the RIAA.

== Track listing ==
No.	Title	Writer(s)	Length
1.	"Seven Year Ache"	Rosanne Cash	3:18
2.	"I Don't Want to Spoil the Party"	Lennon–McCartney	2:36
3.	"Hold On"	R. Cash	3:38
4.	"Blue Moon with Heartache"	R. Cash	4:30
5.	"My Baby Thinks He's a Train"	Leroy Preston	3:16
6.	"No Memories Hangin' Round"	Rodney Crowell	3:26
7.	"I Don't Know Why You Don't Want Me"	R. Cash, Crowell	3:17
8.	"I Wonder"	Preston	3:06
9.	"Never Be You"	Tom Petty, Benmont Tench	3:28
10.	"The Way We Make a Broken Heart"	John Hiatt	3:56
11.	"Tennessee Flat Top Box"	Johnny Cash	3:10
12.	"Black and White"	Preston Smith	3:16

== Personnel ==
- Bobby Bare - background vocals
- Eddie Bayers - drums
- Barry Beckett - keyboards
- Tony Brown - keyboards
- James Burton - guitar
- Rosemary Butler - background vocals
- Rosanne Cash - lead vocals
- John Cowan - background vocals
- Larry Crane - guitar
- Rodney Crowell - guitar, background vocals
- Patricia Darcy - background vocals
- Hank DeVito - steel guitar
- Terry Evans - background vocals
- Anton Fig - drums
- Pat Flynn - guitar
- Vince Gill - background vocals
- Steve Goldstein - keyboards
- Emory Gordy Jr. - bass guitar, guitar, keyboards
- Willie Green Jr. - background vocals
- Emmylou Harris - background vocals
- Ula Hedwig - background vocals
- David Hungate - bass guitar
- Shane Keister - keyboards
- Jennifer Kimball - background vocals
- Bobby King - background vocals
- Albert Lee - guitar
- Paul Leim - drums
- Maxayn Lewis - background vocals
- Larrie Londin - drums
- Randy McCormick - keyboards
- Arnold McCuller - background vocals
- Jerry McGee - guitar
- Edgar Meyer - upright bass
- Mark O'Connor - fiddle
- Joe Osborne - bass guitar
- Jim Photogolo - background vocals
- Frank Reckard - guitar
- Michael Rhodes - bass guitar
- Robert Sabino - keyboards
- Randy Scruggs - guitar
- Ricky Skaggs - fiddle, guitar
- Steuart Smith - guitar
- Harry Stinson - background vocals
- Benmont Tench - keyboards
- Waddy Wachtel - guitar
- Billy Joe Walker Jr. - guitar
- John Ware - drums
- Willie Weeks - bass guitar
- Reggie Young - guitar

== Charts ==
=== Weekly charts ===
Chart (1989)	Peak position
Canadian Albums (RPM)	54
Canadian Country Albums (RPM)	10
US Billboard 200	152
US Top Country Albums (Billboard)	8

=== Year-end charts ===
Chart (1989)	Position
US Top Country Albums (Billboard)	28
