= Retrospective (Rosanne Cash album) =

Compilation album by Rosanne Cash
- Released: 1995
- Genre: Country, pop
- Length: 44:39
- Label: Columbia
- Producer: Rosanne Cash, John Leventhal

Rosanne Cash chronology
The Wheel (1993)	Retrospective (1995)	10 Song Demo (1996)

Professional ratings
Review scores
Source	Rating
AllMusic	3/5 stars

Retrospective is a 1995 compilation album, encapsulating Rosanne Cash's 16 years with Columbia, released as she was leaving the label. Rather than relying on radio hits, Retrospective focused on lesser known album tracks, unreleased material and live recordings. In the years since, as Columbia has let the majority of Cash's albums go out of print, it has become, along with her Greatest Hits collection, the primary source for listeners to obtain most of her material.

== Track listing ==
1. "Our Little Angel" (Elvis Costello)
2. "On the Surface" (Cash, Tittle)
3. "All Come True" (Karl Wallinger)
4. "The Wheel" (Cash)
5. "Sleeping in Paris" (Cash)
6. "707" (Kilzer)
7. "Runaway Train" (Stewart)
8. "I'm Only Sleeping" (Lennon–McCartney)
9. "It Hasn't Happened Yet" (John Hiatt)
10. "On the Inside" (Cash)
11. "What We Really Want" (Cash)
12. "I Count the Tears" (Doc Pomus, Mort Shuman)
13. "Pink Bedroom" (Hiatt)
14. "Seventh Avenue" (Cash, John Leventhal)
15. "A Lover Is Forever" (Steve Goodman)
