= Ethan Russell =

American photographer, video director and author

- Born: November 26, 1945 (age 80); Mount Kisco, New York, U.S.
- Education: Cate School; University of California, Davis
- Occupations: Photographer, author, video director
- Years active: 1968−present
- Known for: Photography work with the Beatles, the Rolling Stones and the Who
- Website: shop.ethanrussell.com

Ethan Allen Russell (born November 26, 1945, in Mount Kisco, New York) is an American photographer, author and video director, mostly of musicians. He is known as "the only rock photographer to have shot album covers for The Beatles, The Rolling Stones and The Who."

== Family and early life ==
The son of Charles Howland Russell and Alice Allen Russell, he is the great-grandson of suffragist Florence Jaffray Harriman and the great-grandson of Episcopal bishop Henry C. Potter. He has three siblings. His brother Jeremy Borden Russell (1944–2005) was founder and manager of the rock band Blue Cheer. Other siblings are Linda Russell Matson, (1947-) and Adam Henry Russell (1953–2009). His godfather is Cole Porter.

His family moved to Manhattan in 1950, then to San Francisco in 1952. Russell attended high school at Cate School outside Santa Barbara, California, then the University of California, Davis, where he majored in English and Art. He was first introduced and became interested in photography at Davis, but did not work professionally until 1968 when he traveled to England.

== Career ==
The Philadelphia Inquirer described Russell when he was beginning his career: "In 1968, Ethan Russell, a lanky Californian fresh out of college, was living in a London flat, psychedelic posters on the wall, battered purple Beatle boots thrown in a corner, a Nikon camera on the table." He had moved to London with aspirations of becoming a writer, working (and photographing) in a home for autistic children part-time. In a 2013 interview with The Guardian he cited the movie Blowup as an inspiration for his move to the UK.

He was introduced to Mick Jagger that year. The Sunday Times described the results of that meeting: "Russell ... hit it off with the singer, and from 1968 to '72 was the Rolling Stones' main photographer. One of his early sessions featured Brian Jones at his home, Cotchford Farm in East Sussex, previously owned by A. A. Milne. Russell's pictures of Jones, draped around a statue of Christopher Robin and provocatively waving a gun, encapsulate the troubled nature of the doomed guitarist, who was found dead at the bottom of his swimming pool six months later. But it's Russell's photographs of the band on their 1969 US tour – most unseen until now – that provide the most compelling insight."

Music critic Joel Selvin wrote about the moment in time when Russell connected with the Rolling Stones: "Russell caught the Rolling Stones at a historic juncture. He took some of the last photos ever taken of Brian Jones, before the founding member was fired from the band. He photographed the Stones' free concert in Hyde Park that served as Jones' memorial after he was found drowned in his swimming pool."

A photo he took was used on the cover of the 1969 album Through the Past, Darkly (Big Hits Vol. 2), which was dedicated to Brian Jones.

== 1969 Rolling Stones American Tour ==
The Stones were taking dangerous quantities ... People ask if I ever was tempted to take drugs with them, but I never worked high or drunk. All the people who wanted to be just like Keith ended up dead.

— Russel on the state of the Rolling Stones by 1972

Russell was hired as the photographer for The Rolling Stones American Tour 1969, and was part of the band's small entourage. The San Francisco Chronicle described his role: "Russell was one of only 16 people on the tour, including the band. With unprecedented access to the Rolling Stones, he captured photos that have become classics."

Joel Selvin observed: "Russell joined a touring party of 16 for the Stones' tour of the United States in 1969, which ended with the disastrous free concert at Altamont Speedway. It was really the first big-time rock tour ever and the world in transition he captured disappeared almost immediately.

His photography was used to illustrate the cover of Get Yer Ya-Ya's Out! The Rolling Stones in Concert, which was recorded during the 1969 tour.

== The Beatles and Let It Be ==
Critic Todd Leopold of CNN Entertainment wrote: "Ethan Russell first met the Beatles in early 1969. Photographs of Mick Jagger and the Rolling Stones production Rock and Roll Circus attracted the interest of Beatles consigliere Neil Aspinall, who invited Russell to Twickenham Studios, where the group was making Let It Be. Russell's photographs ended up on the cover and gatefold of the LP, the last the Beatles released. ... Russell's photographs show four men trying to rescue their fading musical marriage."

Russell was among three photographers at the final formal photo session of the Beatles on August 22, 1969. This was held at Tittenhurst Park, a home then owned by John Lennon and Yoko Ono, and later owned by Ringo Starr. Two of these photos were used for The Hey Jude album. Other photographers participating that day were Monty Fresco of the Daily Mail and Beatles' assistant Mal Evans.

== The Who ==
Working with The Who, Russell did the cover photography for Who's Next in 1971 and the photography for the book that accompanied Quadrophenia in 1973. However, Russell did not shoot the cover for Quadrophenia. That was shot by photographer Graham Hughes. Pete Townshend's opinion of Russell's photographs was: "They look ready to put up in the National Gallery. Ethan is the civilised eye of an uncivilised art-form: rock 'n' roll." Russell received a Grammy nomination for his work on Quadrophenia. One of Russell's photos was used on the cover of the 1988 compilation album, Who's Better, Who's Best.

== Photography of other musicians ==
His roster of subjects also includes; Audioslave, Elkie Brooks, Rosanne Cash, Eric Clapton, Cream, the Eagles, Phil Everly, Jimi Hendrix, John Hiatt, Rickie Lee Jones, Janis Joplin, Jerry Lee Lewis, Jim Morrison, The Moody Blues, Linda Ronstadt, Spooky Tooth, and Traffic.

In 1978 Russell shifted his focus to film and video, becoming "a pioneer in producing music videos", but leaving a cache of iconoclastic still photographs largely unseen for nearly 30 years. He produced and directed films with Rosanne Cash, Emmylou Harris, Rickie Lee Jones, k.d. lang, John Lennon, Joni Mitchell, Yoko Ono, Leon Redbone, Paul Simon, Randy Travis, and Hank Williams, Jr.

In reviewing Rosanne Cash's video What We Really Want in 1991, the Los Angeles Times wrote: "Photographer-director Russell has concocted a weird, two-dimensional world of paintings for Cash to step into, singing one of her latest songs of woe and miscommunication. It's a visual effect that's been tried in videos many times before, but never quite to this successfully surreal an effect."

In the 1990s Russell garnered his second Grammy nomination for the video There's A Tear In My Beer with Hank Williams, Jr.

== Books by Russell ==
- Dear Mr. Fantasy: Diary of a Decade: Our Time and Rock and Roll (1985)

The Christian Science Monitor reviewed this book in 1985: "Every once in a long while, one finds a book that wholly captures the mood and essence of an era. Dear Mr. Fantasy is just such a book. Ethan Russell weaves a tapestry of prose."

- Let It Bleed: The Rolling Stones 1969 Tour (2007)

The San Francisco Chronicle described Russell's book as "a $650 opus that some have called the definitive Rolling Stones book; he's now released a condensed (and more affordable) version."
