= Shawn Pelton =

American drummer and percussionist

- Born: June 1, 1963 (age 63); Kansas City, Missouri, US
- Instruments: Drums, percussion

Shawn Pelton is an American drummer and percussionist. He has recorded with a wide range of artists and has been a first call (Note: A first call musician is session musician whom a producer values and trusts to call first for needed work) player since moving to New York in the late 1980s.

Pelton has recorded with artists such as Sheryl Crow, Shawn Colvin, Natalie Merchant, Ingrid Michaelson, Billy Joel, Van Morrison, Elton John, Rod Stewart, Johnny Cash, Rosanne Cash, Pink, Shakira, Kelly Clarkson, Five For Fighting, Michelle Branch, Regina Spektor, Tears for Fears, Gianluca Grignani, Citizen Cope, Matisyahu, Jonatha Brooke, David Byrne, Edie Brickell, Marc Cohn, Richie Havens, Joan Osborne, Hall and Oates, Odetta, Pavarotti, Phillip Phillips, George Michael, Trombone Shorty, Carly Simon, Dixie Chicks, Chris Botti, Fito Páez and Buddy Guy, and has played on several Grammy winning albums for artists including Ray Charles, The Brecker Brothers, Shawn Colvin, Les Paul and the Hank Williams tribute album with Bob Dylan.

Pelton is also the longtime drummer in the house band for the NBC TV network's sketch comedy and music program Saturday Night Live.

Shawn was the touring drummer on Jon Bon Jovi's Destination Anywhere tour in 1997-1998.

== Early life ==
Pelton was born in Kansas City, Missouri.

"I grew up always banging on things," Pelton said describing his childhood. His first real musical instrument was a cello in 5th grade. But he "bailed as soon as possible to the drums," Pelton said. "I was running around doing gigs at 14, which was a great situation, to actually be in a band that young. The sooner you start making music with other people the better."

== Education ==
Pelton studied at Indiana University's Jacobs School of Music in Bloomington, Indiana, earning a bachelor's degree and a Performer's Certificate in 1985. While there, Pelton studied with Kenny Aronoff, who at the time was the drummer for John Mellencamp. During his summer breaks, Pelton sought out experts elsewhere, including Alan Dawson, who is best known as an early teacher of jazz drummer Tony Williams.

During his time as a student, Pelton taught for a brief period, and also conducted private drum lessons. One of his students was Pete Wilhoit, who would later become a member of Fiction Plane, the opening act for The Police on their 2007 reunion global tour.

== Career ==
He joined the Saturday Night Live band in 1992, saying "It’s a pretty mellow gig...It’s really only 20 days out of the year."

Starting in 2007, Pelton appeared as the drummer on Daryl Hall's internet concert series Live from Daryl's House.

Pelton also served periodically as the substitute drummer in the CBS Orchestra on Late Show with David Letterman during regular drummer Anton Fig's absences.

Pelton is also a founding member of the NYC-based band The Cringe.

== Selected discography ==
Album title	Artist	Year released
Out of the Loop	Brecker Brothers	1994
Picture Perfect Morning	Edie Brickell	1994
Plumb	Jonatha Brooke	1995
A Few Small Repairs	Shawn Colvin	1996
Live! The Real Deal	Buddy Guy	1996
Midnight Without You	Chris Botti	1997
Little Ship	Loudon Wainwright III	1997
Marigold Sky	Hall & Oates	1997
Fool's Parade	Peter Wolf	1998
Burning The Daze	Marc Cohn	1998
Tracks	Bruce Springsteen	1998
Blues Everywhere I Go	Odetta	1999
Timeless: Hank Williams Tribute	with Bob Dylan	2001
Look into the Eyeball	David Byrne	2001
Whole New You	Shawn Colvin	2001
How Sweet It Is	Joan Osborne	2002
What If It All Means Something	Chantal Kreviazuk	2002
Sleepless	Peter Wolf	2002
C'mon, C'mon	Sheryl Crow	2002
Home	Dixie Chicks	2002
How Sweet It Is	Joan Osborne	2002
Hotel Paper	Michelle Branch	2003
C'mon America (Live DVD)	Sheryl Crow	2003
Smile	Lyle Lovett	2003
Breakaway	Kelly Clarkson	2004
Genius Loves Company	Ray Charles	2004
Just Like There's Nothin' to It	Steve Forbert	2004
The Battle for Everything	Five for Fighting	2004
The Clarence Greenwood Recordings	Citizen Cope	2004
Earth Tones	Charlie Hunter	2005
The Legend (Columbia)	Johnny Cash	2005
All I Really Want For Christmas	Steven Curtis Chapman	2005
These Four Walls	Shawn Colvin	2006
Black Cadillac	Rosanne Cash	2006
Begin to Hope	Regina Spektor	2006
Can't Quit the Blues	Buddy Guy	2006
I'm Not Dead	P!nk	2006
Innovation	Charlie Hunter	2006
Oral Fixation, Vols. 1-2	Shakira	2006
Secret World	Tears for Fears	2006
Separate Ways	Teddy Thompson	2006
Stand Still, Look Pretty	The Wreckers	2006
Home for Christmas	Hall & Oates	2006
Sleepless (Peter Wolf album)	Peter Wolf	2007
My December	Kelly Clarkson	2007
Abbey Sings Abbey	Abbey Lincoln	2007
Forever Ray Charles	Ray Charles	2007
Hits and Rarities	Sheryl Crow	2007
Supermoon	Zap Mama	2007
The Best of Van Morrison, Vol. 3	Van Morrison	2007
Les Paul and Friends: Tribute to a Legend	Les Paul	2008
Bleu Pétrole	Alain Bashung	2008
Nobody Left to Crown	Richie Havens	2008
The List	Rosanne Cash	2009
Light	Matisyahu	2009
Greatest Hits... So Far!!!	P!nk	2010
The Essential Rosanne Cash	Rosanne Cash	2011
The Complete EP Collection	James McCartney	2011
Human Again	Ingrid Michaelson	2012
The World from the Side of the Moon	Phillip Phillips	2012
Living in Color	Alexz Johnson	2013
A cure for loneliness	Peter Wolf	2016
Cross Currents	Mark Egan	2024

== Collaborations ==
- Picture Perfect Morning - Edie Brickell (1994)
- A Few Small Repairs - Shawn Colvin (1996)
- Let's Talk About Love - Céline Dion (1997)
- Credo - Jennifer Rush (1997)
- Campi di Popcorn - Gianluca Grignani (1998)
- Burning The Daze - Marc Cohn (1998)
- Holiday Songs and Lullabies - Shawn Colvin (1998)
- Barefoot on the Beach - Michael Franks (1999)
- Joy: A Holiday Collection - Jewel (1999)
- Timeless: The Classics Vol. 2 - Michael Bolton (1999)
- Songs from the Last Century - George Michael (1999)
- The Bedroom Tapes - Carly Simon (2000)
- Whole New You - Shawn Colvin (2001)
- Look Into the Eyeball - David Byrne (2001)
- M.Y.O.B. - Debbie Gibson (2001)
- It Had to Be You: The Great American Songbook - Rod Stewart (2002)
- C'mon, C'mon - Sheryl Crow (2002)
- As Time Goes By: The Great American Songbook, Volume II - Rod Stewart (2003)
- Rules of Travel - Rosanne Cash (2003)
- Hotel Paper - Michelle Branch (2003)
- Breakaway - Kelly Clarkson (2004)
- Indigo: Women of Song - Olivia Newton-John (2004)
- Fijación Oral, Vol. 1 - Shakira (2005)
- Oral Fixation, Vol. 2 - Shakira (2005)
- Black Cadillac - Rosanne Cash (2006)
- These Four Walls - Shawn Colvin (2006)
- Romancing the '60s - Frankie Valli (2007)
- My December - Kelly Clarkson (2007)
- Nobody Left to Crown - Richie Havens (2008)
- The List - Rosanne Cash (2009)
- Everything Comes and Goes - Michelle Branch (2010)
- Time Together - Michael Franks (2011)
- Laughing Down Crying - Daryl Hall (2011)
- The Origin of Love - Mika (2012)
- The River & the Thread - Rosanne Cash (2014)
- This Is Where I Live - William Bell (2016)
