= Lera Lynn =

American singer-songwriter

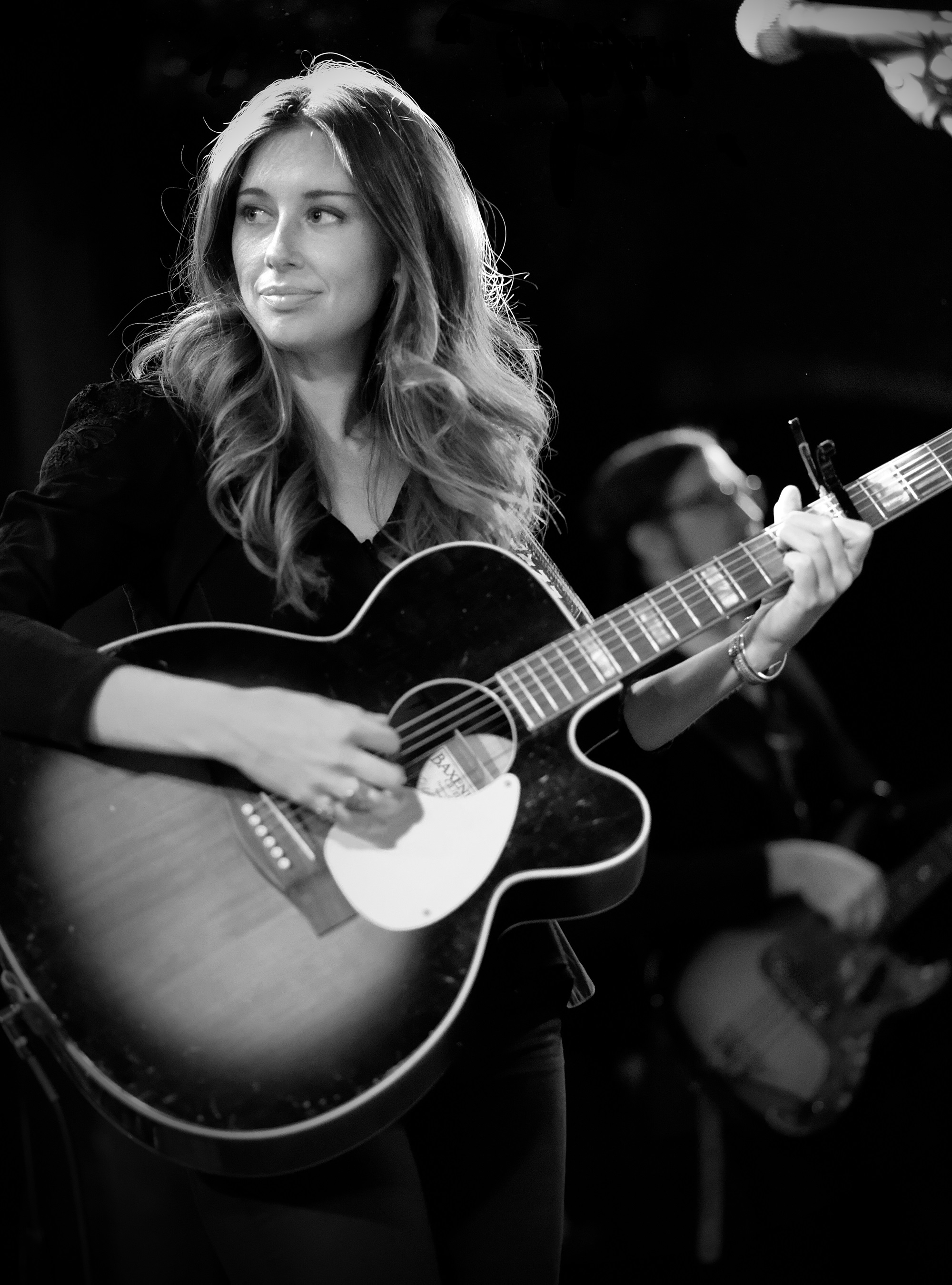
- Lynn performing in October 2015

Background information
- Born: December 5, 1984 (age 40); Houston, Texas, United States
- Origin: Athens, Georgia
- Genres: Indie rock, Americana
- Occupations: Singer; songwriter; musician
- Labels: Resistor Music
- Website: www.leralynn.com

Lera Lynn (born December 5, 1984) is an American singer, songwriter, and musician.

== Early life ==
Born in Houston, Texas, Lynn was raised in Georgia. She has a bachelor's degree in anthropology from the University of Georgia. Before attending the university, she briefly attended Young Harris College in Young Harris, Georgia.

== Career ==
Lynn's first LP, Have You Met Lera Lynn, was released in 2011. In 2014, she released an EP entitled Lying in the Sun and also began creating music for the second season of the crime drama series True Detective. Working with songwriter and music producer T Bone Burnett, the two collaborated with singer-songwriter Rosanne Cash at Burnett's home in Los Angeles, California with two of the resulting tracks being included on Cash's 2018 album She Remembers Everything. After approving the musical tracks, series creator Nic Pizzolatto cast Lynn as a recurring character who performs the songs in a dive bar frequented by the main characters. Her 2016 album Resistor was reviewed in Rolling Stone.

== Discography ==
- Have You Met Lera Lynn (2011)
- Lying in the Sun (2014)
- The Avenues (2014)
- True Detective: Music From the HBO Series Soundtrack (2015)
- Resistor (2016)
- Plays Well With Others (2018)
- On My Own (2020)
- Something More Than Love (2022)
- Comic Book Cowboy (2025)
