= She Remembers Everything =

Studio album by Rosanne Cash
- Released: November 2, 2018
- Recorded: 2017–2018
- Venues: Church House Studio, Austin TX; Flora Recording & Payback, Portland, OR; New York Noise, NYC; Studio 22, NYC; United Recording Studio B, Hollywood CA
- Genres: Americana, country folk
- Length: 38:44
- Label: Blue Note
- Producers: Tucker Martine, John Leventhal

Rosanne Cash chronology
The River & the Thread (2014)	She Remembers Everything (2018)

She Remembers Everything is Rosanne Cash's fourteenth album. The album was released on November 2, 2018, as well as Cash's second album for Blue Note Records. The album was produced by Tucker Martine and Cash's husband John Leventhal. Cash co-wrote every song on the album. The track "Crossing to Jerusalem" received a Grammy Award for Best American Roots Song nomination at the 62nd Grammy Awards.

== Critical reception ==
Professional ratings
Aggregate scores
Source	Rating
Metacritic	80/100
Review scores
Source	Rating
AllMusic	4/5 stars
Chicago Tribune	3/4 stars
Paste	7.7/10
Pitchfork	7.6/10
Rolling Stone Country	4/5 stars

She Remembers Everything received positive reviews from critics. Writing for Rolling Stone, Will Hermes described the album as a "master class in channeling life into song" and added that "Cash is one of the most ambitious and literary songwriters of her generation" who "goes especially deep on this set", describing how "sometimes the songs appear to conjure autobiography, like “Everyone But Me,” which involves the loss of a mother and father" and "other times she puts more distance between self and subject". Of the album's genre, he noted that Cash "remains hard to categorize, refracting country alongside rock, folk and other elements befitting a longtime resident of New York City’s melting pot". Hermes considers "8 God's of Harlem" as the album's "standout" track and also highlights closing track "My Least Favorite Life", describing it as "the album’s dark lodestar" and "a sweetly grim waltz with an Eastern European lilt, Brechtian existentialism and a little Tom Waits-ian surrealism" and concludes that "in her narrative hands, it’s comforting not to be traveling alone".

In a similarly positive review, Mark Deming of AllMusic notes that "while [Cash] sounds fresh and vital on every track, the music clearly speaks of experience and maturity" and describes the album as " the work of a musician and songwriter who knows her craft inside and out" with a "lyrical voice full of compassion and lacking in fear or hesitancy", explaining that " Cash is willing to share what lurks in her mind and her heart, and she has the tools to articulate her ideas with literacy and passion in equal measure" through songs that are "rich, nuanced, and never simplistic". He concludes by saying that "She Remembers Everything is a challenging and rewarding set from an artist who is at the peak of her abilities, and if anyone needs to be reminded that Rosanne Cash is one of America's best and smartest songwriters, all they need to do is spend some time with these songs."

== Track listing ==
Adapted from AllMusic

No.	Title	Writer(s)	Length
1.	"The Only Thing Worth Fighting For" (featuring Colin Meloy)	T. Bone Burnett, Rosanne Cash, Lera Lynn	4:20
2.	"The Undiscovered Country"	Cash, John Leventhal	5:20
3.	"8 Gods of Harlem" (featuring Elvis Costello and Kris Kristofferson)	Cash, Costello, Kristofferson	3:54
4.	"Rabbit Hole"	Cash	4:07
5.	"Crossing to Jerusalem"	Cash, Leventhal	3:32
6.	"Not Many Miles to Go"	Cash	4:03
7.	"Everyone But Me"	Cash, Leventhal	3:37
8.	"She Remembers Everything"	Cash, Sam Phillips	3:37
9.	"Particle and Wave"	Cash	2:12
10.	"My Least Favorite Life"	Burnett, Cash, Lynn	4:03
Total length:			38:44

Deluxe Edition
No.	Title	Writer(s)	Length
11.	"Nothing But the Truth"	Cash, Joe Henry	4:40
12.	"Every Day Feels Like a New Goodbye"	Cash, Leventhal	2:18
13.	"The Parting Glass"	Traditional	2:42
Total length:			48:25

== Chart performance ==
Chart (2014)	Peak position
Belgian Albums (Ultratop Flanders)	179
Scottish Albums (Official Charts)	62
UK Americana Albums (Official Charts)	2
UK Country Albums (Official Charts)	2
US Billboard 200	172
US Top Album Sales (Billboard)	24
US Top Country Albums (Billboard)	16
US Americana/Folk Albums (Billboard)	5
US Top Rock Albums (Billboard)	30
US Indie Store Album Sales (Billboard)	11

== Personnel ==
- Ames Asbell - viola
- Eric Baker - art direction, art design
- Stephen Barber - string arrangement
- Jay Bellerose - drums
- Wes Bender - photography
- Joe Bonadio - drums
- David Boyle - string engineer
- Rob Burger - accordion, keyboards, organ, piano, pump organ, vibraphone, backing vocals
- Rosanne Cash - vocals, guitar
- Justin Chase - assistant engineer, acoustic guitar, mellotron, piano
- Elvis Costello - guest vocals, acoustic guitar
- Paul Dalen - production assistant
- Jill Dell'Abate - production assistant
- Rick DePoi - engineer
- Don Dixon - photography
- Dave Eggar - cello
- Monique Evelyn - assistant engineer, production assistant
- Ryan Freeland - engineer, mixing
- Eric Gorfain - vocal engineer
- Joe Henry - producer (track 13)
- Jessica Meyer - viola
- Zev Katz - bass guitar
- Jill Krementz - photography
- Kris Kristofferson - guest vocals
- Jakob Leventhal - engineer
- John Leventhal - arranger, bass guitar, drums, engineer, electric guitar, harmonium, mandolin, mixing, organ, pedal steel, piano, producer, upright bass, string arrangements, background vocals
- Adam Levy - acoustic guitar
- Bob Ludwig - mastering
- Leigh Mahoney - violin
- Tucker Martine - engineer, producer, mixing
- Lauren McIntosh - calligraphy
- Colin Meloy - harmony vocals
- Jip Moors - photography
- Maxim Moston - violin
- Portia Munson - cover art
- Sarah Nelson - cello
- Sam Phillips - harmony vocals
- David Piltch - electric bass
- Jason Quigley - photography
- Dan Reiser - drums, percussion
- Sebastian Steinberg - bass guitar, backing vocals
- Helge Thelen - photography
- Katherine Thomas - violin
- Patrick Warren - mellotron, piano
- Tim Young - baritone guitar, electric guitar, backing vocals
