= Second to No One =

Single by Rosanne Cash

from the album Rhythm & Romance
- B-side: "Never Alone"
- Released: July 19, 1986
- Genre: Country
- Length: 3:48
- Label: Columbia
- Songwriter(s): Rosanne Cash
- Producer(s): David Malloy

Rosanne Cash singles chronology
"Hold On" (1986)	"Second to No One" (1986)	"The Way We Make a Broken Heart" (1987)

"Second to No One" is a song written and recorded by American country music artist Rosanne Cash. It was released in July 1986 as the fourth single from the album Rhythm & Romance. The song reached #5 on the Billboard Hot Country Singles & Tracks chart.

== Chart performance ==
Chart (1986)	Peak position
US Hot Country Songs (Billboard)	5
Canadian RPM Country Tracks	4
