= The Cringe =

American rock band

The Cringe is an independent rock band based in New York City. It features John Cusimano, James Rotondi, Jonny Blaze, and Shawn Pelton. The Cringe played at the SXSW music festival in 2008 and 2009. As of late November 2014, the Cringe had released three full-length albums, titled Scratch the Surface, Tipping Point, and most recently, Play Thing.

Lead singer John Cusimano, whose primary occupation is law, is married to TV cooking show host Rachael Ray. "Cringe" is a term used to describe a strong feeling of discomfort, embarrassment, or awkwardness in response to someone's behavior, words, or actions
