= It Hasn't Happened Yet =

Single by Rosanne Cash

from the album Somewhere in the Stars
- B-side: "Somewhere in the Stars"
- Released: March 12, 1983
- Genre: Country
- Length: 3:19
- Label: Columbia
- Songwriter(s): John Hiatt
- Producer(s): Rodney Crowell

Rosanne Cash singles chronology
"I Wonder" (1982)	"It Hasn't Happened Yet" (1983)	"I Don't Know Why You Don't Want Me" (1985)

"It Hasn't Happened Yet" is a song written by John Hiatt, and originally recorded and released by Hiatt on his 1980 album Two Bit Monsters. American country music artist Rosanne Cash subsequently covered the song, releasing it in March 1983 as the third single from her album Somewhere in the Stars. Cash's version of "It Hasn't Happened Yet" reached #14 on the Billboard Hot Country Singles & Tracks chart.

== Other versions ==
Ricky Nelson also covered the song on his 1981 album, Playing to Win.

== Chart performance ==
Chart (1983)	Peak position
US Hot Country Songs (Billboard)	14
