= Black Cadillac (album) =

Studio album by Rosanne Cash
- Released: January 23, 2006
- Recorded: November 2004–July 2005
- Genres: Country folk, Americana
- Length: 46:38
- Label: Capitol
- Producers: Bill Bottrell, John Leventhal

Rosanne Cash chronology
The Very Best of Rosanne Cash (2005)	Black Cadillac (2006)	The List (2009)

Singles from Black Cadillac
- 1. "Black Cadillac" Released: 2005; 2. "House on the Lake" Released: 2006; 3. "Radio Operator" Released: 2006

Professional ratings
Aggregate scores
Source	Rating
Metacritic	84/100
Review scores
Source	Rating
AllMusic	4.5/5 stars
Entertainment Weekly	B+
The Guardian	4/5 stars
Los Angeles Times	3/4 stars
Mojo	4/5 stars
Now	4/5 stars
PopMatters	8/10
Q	3.5/5 stars
Rolling Stone	4/5 stars
Uncut	8/10

Black Cadillac is Rosanne Cash's eleventh studio album, released on January 23, 2006. The album is dedicated to Cash's mother, Vivian Liberto, and father, Johnny Cash, both of whom died at the age of 71, hence the 71-second silent track at the end. The album was nominated for a Grammy Award for Best Contemporary Folk album in 2007. This was Cash's last album for Capitol Records, a label Cash worked from 1996 to 2007. After that album's release, Cash left Capitol.

== Track listing ==
All songs were written by Rosanne Cash, except where noted.

1. "Black Cadillac"
2. "Radio Operator" (Cash, John Leventhal)
3. "I Was Watching You"
4. "Burn Down This Town" (Cash, Leventhal)
5. "God Is in the Roses"
6. "House on the Lake" (Cash, Leventhal)
7. "The World Unseen"
8. "Like Fugitives
9. "Dreams Are Not My Home"
10. "Like a Wave"
11. "World Without Sound"
12. "The Good Intent" (Cash, Leventhal)
13. "0:71"

== Musicians ==
- Rosanne Cash: Vocals
- Bill Bottrell: Guitars, 12-String Guitar, E-Bow Guitar, Mando Cello, Bouzouki, Background Vocals, E-Bow, Mixing
- Benmont Tench: Organ, Wurlitzer Piano, Background Vocals
- Bruce Fowler: Trombone
- John Leventhal: Guitars, Bass, Dobro, Percussion, Mandolin, Keyboards, Piano, Producer, Engineer, Mixing
- Shawn Pelton: Drums
- Michael Rhodes: Bass
- Kevin Breit: Mandolin, Acoustic Guitar
- Catherine Russell: Harmony Vocal
- Charley Drayton: Drums
- Brian MacLeod: Drums, Background Vocals
- Dan Schwartz: Bass, Background Vocals
- Jose Hernandez: Trumpet
- Albert Wing: Tenor Saxophone, Clarinet
- Tom Gloadly, Joe Hogan, Mimi Parker: Engineering
- Matt Shane: Mixing Assistant

Mastered by Ted Jensen

== Chart performance ==
Chart (2006)	Peak position
U.S. Billboard Top Country Albums	18
U.S. Billboard 200	78
