= Rules of Travel =

Studio album by Rosanne Cash
- Released: March 25, 2003
- Genre: Country
- Length: 39:07
- Label: Capitol Nashville
- Producer: John Leventhal

Rosanne Cash chronology
10 Song Demo (1996)	Rules of Travel (2003)	The Very Best of Rosanne Cash (2005)

Professional ratings
Review scores
Source	Rating
AllMusic	4/5 stars
Robert Christgau	(3-star Honorable Mention)

Rules of Travel is a studio album by singer-songwriter Rosanne Cash, released in 2003. It was her first album of new material in nearly seven years. On the track "September When It Comes," she is joined by her father Johnny Cash; Johnny Cash would in fact die in September 2003, making this one of the last recordings to be released during his lifetime.

== Track listing ==
No.	Title	Writer(s)	Length
1.	"Beautiful Pain"	Craig Northey	2:50
2.	"44 Stories"	Rosanne Cash, John Leventhal, Robert Burke Warren	3:19
3.	"I'll Change for You"	Rosanne Cash	3:50
4.	"Rules of Travel"	Rosanne Cash, John Leventhal	3:54
5.	"September When It Comes" (with Johnny Cash)	Rosanne Cash, John Leventhal	3:40
6.	"Hope Against Hope"	Jakob Dylan, Joe Henry	3:56
7.	"Will You Remember Me"	Rosanne Cash, John Leventhal	2:41
8.	"Three Steps Down"	Marc Cohn, John Leventhal	3:45
9.	"Closer Than I Appear"	Rosanne Cash	3:28
10.	"Western Wall"	Rosanne Cash	2:57
11.	"Last Stop Before Home"	Rosanne Cash	4:31

== Musicians ==
- Rosanne Cash: vocals, acoustic guitar
- Johnny Cash: vocals
- Steve Earle: vocals
- Sheryl Crow: harmony vocals
- Teddy Thompson: harmony vocals
- Catherine Russell: Background vocals
- John Leventhal: guitars, bass guitar, organ, wurlitzer, keyboards, percussion
- Zev Katz: bass guitar, upright bass
- Michael Rhodes: bass guitar
- Doug Petty: organ
- Danny Louis: organ
- Larry Farrell: trombone
- Rick Depofi: tenor saxophone
- Tony Kadlek: flugelhorn
- Shawn Pelton: drums, percussion
- Dennis McDermott: drums, percussion
- Matt Keeler: drums
- Craig Northey: hand drum

== Chart performance ==
Chart (2003)	Peak position
U.S. Billboard Top Country Albums	16
U.S. Billboard 200	130
