= The List (album) =

Studio album by Rosanne Cash
- Released: October 6, 2009
- Genres: Country, Americana
- Length: 40:11
- Label: Manhattan
- Producer: John Leventhal

Rosanne Cash chronology
Black Cadillac (2006)	The List (2009)	The River & the Thread (2014)

Professional ratings
Review scores
Source	Rating
AllMusic	4/5 stars
Paste	9/10 stars
Slant Magazine	4/5 stars

The List is Rosanne Cash's twelfth studio album, released on Manhattan Records on October 6, 2009, her only album for the label.

The album is based on a list of 100 greatest country and American songs that father Johnny Cash gave her when she was 18, to expand her knowledge of country music. The album featured covers of classic songs, and was dedicated to her father Johnny Cash. It also includes guest performances by Bruce Springsteen, Elvis Costello, Jeff Tweedy and Rufus Wainwright.

The album also contained covers of classic country songs made by Jimmie Rodgers, The Carter Family, Don Gibson, Ray Price, Lefty Frizzell, Patsy Cline, and other country stars, as well the traditional folk song "Motherless Children" and 1960s folk numbers by Bob Dylan and Peter, Paul, and Mary. Three songs had previously been recorded by her father: "Sea of Heartbreak", "The Long Black Veil," which he had recorded and performed numerous times and "Girl from the North Country", a 1963 Bob Dylan song that was re-recorded as a duet between Dylan and Cash in 1969 for Dylan's Nashville Skyline album.

The List peaked at #5 on Billboard's country album chart — Cash's first top ten album on the chart in 22 years — and hit #22 on the general Billboard Hot 200, topping her previously most successful album on that chart, 1981's Seven Year Ache which peaked at #26. It was also her first entry on the Billboard Top Rock Albums chart, where it debuted and peaked at #8. The album was nominated for a Grammy Award for Best Americana Album and won the prestigious Album of the Year award at the 2010 Americana Music Honors & Awards.

== Track listing ==
No.	Title	Writer(s)	Length
1.	"Miss the Mississippi and You"	William Heagney	3:12
2.	"Motherless Children"	Public Domain, arr. by Rosanne Cash and John Leventhal	3:06
3.	"Sea of Heartbreak" (featuring Bruce Springsteen)	Hal David, Paul Hampton	3:06
4.	"Take These Chains from My Heart"	Hy Heath, Fred Rose	3:32
5.	"I'm Movin' On"	Hank Snow	3:45
6.	"Heartaches by the Number" (featuring Elvis Costello)	Harlan Howard	3:21
7.	"500 Miles"	Hedy West	3:04
8.	"Long Black Veil" (featuring Jeff Tweedy)	Danny Dill, Marijohn Wilkin	3:10
9.	"She's Got You"	Hank Cochran	3:07
10.	"Girl from the North Country"	Bob Dylan	3:32
11.	"Silver Wings" (featuring Rufus Wainwright)	Merle Haggard	3:45
12.	"Bury Me Under the Weeping Willow"	A. P. Carter	3:33

Barnes & Noble bonus track
No.	Title	Length
13.	"Sweet Memories"	3:30

iTunes bonus track
No.	Title	Writer(s)	Length
13.	"A Satisfied Mind" (featuring Neko Case)	Red Hayes, Jack Rhodes	4:02

== Personnel ==
- Rosanne Cash – vocals
- Bruce Springsteen – vocals
- Jeff Tweedy – vocals
- Rufus Wainwright – vocals
- Elvis Costello – vocals
- Joe Bonadio – drums
- Zev Katz – bass
- John Leventhal – organ, bass, dobro, guitar, harmonica, mandolin, percussion, drums, harmonium, Wurlitzer
- Tim Luntzel – bass
- Shawn Pelton – drums
- Curtis King – background vocals
- Rick DePofi – piano, bass clarinet, horn

Production notes:

- John Leventhal – producer, engineer, mixing
- Rick DePofi – co-producer, engineer, mixing
- Ted Jensen – mastering
- Deborah Feingold – photography
- Perry Greenfield – product manager
- Jill Dell'Abate – production coordination

== Charts ==
=== Weekly charts ===
Chart (2009)	Peak position
German Albums (Offizielle Top 100)	88
Norwegian Albums (VG-lista)	39
Swedish Albums (Sverigetopplistan)	19
US Billboard 200	22
US Top Country Albums (Billboard)	5
US Top Rock Albums (Billboard)	8

=== Year-end charts ===
Chart (2009)	Position
US Top Country Albums (Billboard)	65
Chart (2010)	Position
US Top Country Albums (Billboard)	49
