= This Is Where I Live =

Studio album by William Bell
- Released: June 3, 2016
- Genre: Rhythm and blues, Americana, soul, roots
- Length: 38:49
- Label: Stax
- Producer: John Leventhal

William Bell chronology
New Lease on Life (2006)	This Is Where I Live (2016)

This Is Where I Live is an album by William Bell released on June 3, 2016, in the US and July 8, 2016, elsewhere. It won Bell a Grammy Award for Best Americana Album.

== Reception ==
Professional ratings
Aggregate scores
Source	Rating
Metacritic	86/100
Review scores
Source	Rating
AllMusic	4/5 stars
All About Jazz	5/5 stars
The Guardian	4/5 stars
The Independent	5/5 stars
The Irish Times	4/5 stars
Mojo	4/5 stars
Paste	9.2/10
The Telegraph	3/5 stars
Tom Hull	B
Uncut	8/10

PopMatters gave the album 8 out of 10 stars, calling it "an imperative listen for anyone claiming to be a fan of rhythm and blues, both old and new."

Following his Grammy win, streaming of "Born Under A Bad Sign" (which Bell performed at the ceremony with Gary Clark Jr.) on Spotify increased by 4,950%, with overall streams increasing by 680%. Similarly, streaming of Bell's music on Pandora increased by 12,085%.

== Track listing ==
No.	Title	Writer(s)	Length
1.	"The Three of Me"	William Bell, John Leventhal, Marc Cohn	3:24
2.	"The House Always Wins"	Bell, Leventhal, Cory Chisel, Scott Bomar	2:56
3.	"Poison in the Well"	Bell, Leventhal, Cohn	3:15
4.	"I Will Take Care of You"	Bell, Leventhal	2:52
5.	"Born Under a Bad Sign"	Bell, Booker T. Jones	3:17
6.	"All Your Stories"	Jesse Winchester	2:56
7.	"Walking on a Tightrope"	Leventhal, Rosanne Cash	2:52
8.	"This Is Where I Live"	Bell, Leventhal	3:14
9.	"More Rooms"	Bell, Leventhal, Cohn	4:19
10.	"All the Things You Can't Remember"	Bell, Leventhal, Cohn	3:00
11.	"Mississippi-Arkansas Bridge"	Bell, Leventhal, Cohn	3:47
12.	"People Want to Go Home"	Bell, Leventhal	2:58
