= Couldn't Do Nothin' Right =

Single by Rosanne Cash

from the album Right or Wrong
- B-side: "Seeing's Believing"
- Released: February 2, 1980
- Genre: Country
- Length: 4:48
- Label: Columbia
- Songwriter(s): Karen Brooks, Gary P. Nunn
- Producer(s): Rodney Crowell

Rosanne Cash singles chronology
"No Memories Hangin' Round" (1979)	"Couldn't Do Nothin' Right" (1980)	"Take Me, Take Me" (1980)

"Couldn't Do Nothin' Right" is a song written by Karen Brooks and Gary P. Nunn, and recorded by American country music artist Rosanne Cash. It was released in February 1980 as the second single from Cash's album Right or Wrong. The song reached number fifteen on the Billboard Hot Country Singles & Tracks chart, becoming her second major hit and her first major hit as a solo artist. In addition, the song became Cash's second entry on the Canadian RPM Country Songs chart, reaching number twenty-six.

== Chart performance ==
Chart (1980)	Peak position
US Hot Country Songs (Billboard)	15
Canadian RPM Country Songs	26
