= The River & the Thread =

Studio album by Rosanne Cash
- Released: January 14, 2014
- Length: 38:15
- Label: Blue Note
- Producer: John Leventhal

Rosanne Cash chronology
The List (2009)	The River & the Thread (2014)	She Remembers Everything (2018)

Singles from The River & the Thread
- 1. "Modern Blue" Released: 2013; 2. "The Sunken Lands" Released: 2014

The River & the Thread is the thirteenth studio album by American singer-songwriter Rosanne Cash. It was released on January 14, 2014, as her first album for Blue Note Records. The album received critical acclaim from music critics. The album won three Grammy Awards on February 8, 2015, including "Best Americana Album", "Best American Roots Song" and "Best American Roots Performance".

== Critical reception ==
Professional ratings
Aggregate scores
Source	Rating
Metacritic	87/100
Review scores
Source	Rating
AllMusic	4/5 stars
Blurt	4/5 stars
Consequence of Sound	B
Country Weekly	B+
Los Angeles Times	4/4 stars
New York Daily News	4/5 stars
The New Zealand Herald	4.5/5 stars
Paste	8.8/10
Record Collector	5/5 stars
USA Today	4/4 stars

The River & the Thread garnered critical acclaim by music critics. At Metacritic, which assigns a mean score from selected critics' ratings and reviews, the album holds a score of 87 (based on 19 reviews), which indicates "universal acclaim". At Los Angeles Times, Randy Lewis rated the album a perfect four stars, proclaiming that "It's an album we'll be looking at in December when it's time to single out the most powerful works of 2014. Holly Gleason of Paste rated the album an eight point eight, noting that "With The River & The Thread, she comes home with the warmth reserved for knowing where we're from." At The New Zealand Herald, Graham Reid rated the album four-and-a-half stars, saying that on this album "Cash proves again she does the darkly philosophical, ruminative stuff better and more convincingly than most." Jerry Shriver of USA Today rated the album a perfect four stars, calling it "a captivating and sometimes haunting album that's among the finest of her career." At Record Collector, Terry Stauton rated the album a perfect five stars, exclaiming that "It's a record that her late father would have been enormously proud of, and the first essential country album of 2014."

At Country Weekly, Tammy Ragusa graded the album a B+, indicating this album "will require multiple listens to truly appreciate, so set aside some time to soak in this one." Tony Hardy of Consequence of Sound graded the album a B, writing that the album is "a consummate piece of work, and an evocative way to honor both personal and public history." At AllMusic, stating that the artist "learned to make every word and every note count, and this album confirms once again that she's matured into a singular artist with the talent and the vision to make these stories of her travels in the South come to vivid and affecting life." Jim Farber of the New York Daily News rated the album four stars, affirming that "As always, Cash's vocals aren't brimming with character, but their tidiness suits her observational lyrics and considered personality. Together, they lead her home by a route laid out clearly enough to show just how far she strayed." At Blurt, Lee Zimmerman rated the album four stars, alluding to how the album "manages to surge and sway all at the same time", and noting that "Indeed, it doesn't get much better than this."

== Track list ==
All tracks are written by Rosanne Cash and John Leventhal, except where noted.

No.	Title	Length
1.	"A Feather's Not a Bird"	3:18
2.	"The Sunken Lands"	2:56
3.	"Etta's Tune" (featuring John Paul White)	3:44
4.	"Modern Blue"	3:02
5.	"Tell Heaven"	2:40
6.	"The Long Way Home"	3:17
7.	"World of Strange Design" (featuring Derek Trucks on slide guitar)	3:25
8.	"Night School"	3:48
9.	"50,000 Watts"	2:58
10.	"When the Master Calls the Roll" (featuring Rodney Crowell, Amy Helm, Kris Kristofferson, John Prine and Tony Joe White)	5:08
11.	"Money Road" (featuring Allison Moorer)	4:01

Deluxe Edition bonus tracks
No.	Title	Writer(s)	Length
12.	"Two Girls"	Townes Van Zandt	3:40
13.	"Biloxi"	Jesse Winchester	3:26
14.	"Your Southern Heart"	Cash, Leventhal	2:09

Target Edition bonus tracks
No.	Title	Length
12.	"Money Road (Alternate Version/Target Exclusive)"
13.	"The Sunken Lands (Acoustic Version/Target Exclusive)"

== Personnel ==
Adapted from Rosanne Cash's official website.

- Tawatha Agee - background vocals
- Rosanne Cash - lead vocals, background vocals
- Cory Chisel - harmony vocals
- Reuben Cohen - mastering
- Donivan Cowart - recording
- Jon Cowherd - wurlitzer piano
- Rodney Crowell - choir (track 10)
- Jill Dell'Abate - production co-ordination
- Rick DePofi - background vocals, percussion, mixing
- Dave Eggar - cello
- Tabitha Fair - background vocals
- Larry Farrell - trombone
- Amy Helm - background vocals, choir (track 10)
- John James - background vocals
- Curtis King - background vocals
- Kris Kristofferson - choir (track 10)
- Jake Leventhal - background vocals, percussion
- John Leventhal - producer, mixing, guitar, harmony vocals, bass guitar, drums, percussion, organ, celeste, mandolin, electric sitar, string arrangement
- Tim Luntzel - bass guitar, upright bass
- Gavin Lurssen - mastering
- David Mansfield - violin, viola
- Allison Moorer - harmony vocals (track 11)
- Shawn Pelton - drums
- John Prine - choir (track 10)
- Dan Rieser - drums
- Catherine Russell - background vocals
- Bobby Tis - recording
- Derek Trucks - slide guitar
- John Paul White - harmony vocals (track 3)
- Tony Joe White - choir (track 10)
- Gabe Witcher - fiddle

== Chart performance ==
The album debuted on the Billboard 200 at No. 11 with 19,000 copies sold for the week. The album has sold 94,000 copies in the US as of February 2015.

=== Weekly charts ===
Chart (2014)	Peak position
Norwegian Albums (VG-lista)	4
UK Albums (Official Charts)	18
US Billboard 200	11
US Top Country Albums (Billboard)	2
US Americana/Folk Albums (Billboard)	1
Scottish Albums (Official Charts)	18
Belgian Albums (Ultratop Flanders)	63
Dutch Albums (Album Top 100)	64
Swedish Albums (Sverigetopplistan)	37

=== Year-end charts ===
Chart (2014)	Position
US Top Country Albums (Billboard)	58
US Top Folk Albums (Billboard)	13
