= Somewhere in the Stars =

Studio album by Rosanne Cash
- Released: June 16, 1982
- Studio: Woodland (Nashville, Tennessee); Magnolia Sound
- Genre: Country
- Length: 34:08
- Label: Columbia
- Producer: Rodney Crowell

Rosanne Cash chronology
Seven Year Ache (1981)	Somewhere in the Stars (1982)	Rhythm & Romance (1985)

Singles from Somewhere in the Stars
- 1. "Ain't No Money" Released: May 29, 1982; 2. "I Wonder" Released: October 9, 1982; 3. "It Hasn't Happened Yet" Released: March 12, 1983

Professional ratings
Review scores
Source	Rating
AllMusic	4/5 stars
Rolling Stone	4/5 stars

Somewhere in the Stars is the fourth studio album by American singer Rosanne Cash, released on June 16, 1982, by Columbia Records; her third album for the label. It produced three Billboard hits in the country top 20, including the No. 4 "Ain't No Money", the No. 8 "I Wonder", and the No. 14 "It Hasn't Happened Yet". The album peaked at No. 6 on the country albums chart. Cash's father Johnny Cash sang background vocals on the track "That's How I Got to Memphis".

== Track listing ==
No.	Title	Writer(s)	Length
1.	"Ain't No Money"	Rodney Crowell	3:26
2.	"Down on Love"	Gordon Payne, Don White	3:27
3.	"I Wonder"	Leroy Preston	3:02
4.	"Oh, Yes I Can"	Susanna Clark, John Reid	3:09
5.	"Looking for a Corner"	Rosanne Cash, Crowell	4:50
6.	"It Hasn't Happened Yet"	John Hiatt	3:18
7.	"That's How I Got to Memphis" (backing vocal by Johnny Cash)	Tom T. Hall	2:21
8.	"Third Rate Romance"	Russell Smith	3:35
9.	"I Look for Love"	Hiatt	3:28
10.	"Somewhere in the Stars"	Cash	3:32

== Personnel ==
- Rosanne Cash - Vocals, Guitar
- Vince Gill - Rhythm Guitar, Vocals
- Albert Lee - Guitar
- Larrie Londin - Drums
- Bill Payne - Organ
- Ricky Skaggs - Vocals
- Reggie Young - Electric Guitar
- Russell Smith - Vocals
- Tony Brown - Electric Piano
- Richard Bennett - Electric Guitar
- Rosemary Butler - Vocals
- Hank DeVito - Steel Guitar
- Emory Gordy Jr. - Guitar, Bass, Piano
- Marty Grebb - Saxophone
- Sherilyn Huffman - Vocals
- Shane Keister - Synthesizer
- Maxayn Lewis - Vocals
- Mike Porter - Percussion
- Sharon White-Skaggs - Vocals
- Johnny Cash - Vocals on "That's How I Got To Memphis"

Technical

- Bradley Hartman - engineer
- Beverly Parker - photography

== Charts ==
=== Weekly charts ===
Chart (1982)	Peak position
US Billboard 200	76
US Top Country Albums (Billboard)	6

=== Year-end charts ===
Chart (1982)	Position
US Top Country Albums (Billboard)	50
