= Interiors (Rosanne Cash album) =

Studio album by Rosanne Cash
- Released: October 5, 1990
- Genre: Folk-pop
- Label: Columbia
- Producer: Rosanne Cash

Rosanne Cash chronology
Hits 1979–1989 (1989)	Interiors (1990)	The Wheel (1993)

Singles from Interiors
- 1. "What We Really Want" Released: September 29, 1990

Professional ratings
Review scores
Source	Rating
AllMusic	4.5/5 stars
Chicago Tribune	3.5/4 stars
Christgau's Consumer Guide	A−
Entertainment Weekly	B−
Los Angeles Times	3.5/5 stars
The Philadelphia Inquirer	3.5/4 stars
Rolling Stone	4/5 stars
The Rolling Stone Album Guide	4/5 stars
Stylus Magazine	A−
Uncut	9/10

Interiors is the seventh studio album by American country music singer Rosanne Cash. The album was released on October 5, 1990, as her sixth album for Columbia Records. The album accounted for her last appearances on the Hot Country Songs charts: "What We Really Want" reached number 39, and "On the Surface" reached number 69. In The Village Voice's annual Pazz & Jop critics poll for the year's best albums, Interiors finished at No. 8.

== Track listing ==
No.	Title	Writer(s)	Length
1.	"On the Inside"	Rosanne Cash	3:19
2.	"Dance with the Tiger"	Cash, John Stewart	3:48
3.	"On the Surface"	Cash, Jimmy Tittle	2:56
4.	"Real Woman"	Cash, Rodney Crowell	4:00
5.	"This World"	Cash	3:29
6.	"What We Really Want"	Cash	3:29
7.	"Mirror Image"	Cash	3:17
8.	"Land of Nightmares"	Cash, Vince Melamed	2:28
9.	"I Want a Cure"	Cash	4:19
10.	"Paralyzed"	Cash	3:03

=== The Full Sessions (1990) bonus tracks ===
11. "Portrait" (Cash, Keith Sykes) – 3:48
12. "All Come True" (Karl Wallinger) – 5:20

=== Reissue bonus tracks ===
13. "This World" (live) (Cash) – 4:09
14. "What We Really Want" (acoustic) (Rosanne Cash) – 3:34

== Personnel ==
- Rosanne Cash: vocals
- Vince Melamed: piano, keyboards
- Maura O'Connell: violin, background vocals
- Rodney Crowell: guest vocal
- Mark O'Connor: mandolin
- Jerry Douglas: electric slide guitar, dobro
- Edgar Meyer: Areo bass
- Pat Flynn: acoustic guitar
- Eddie Bayers: drums
- Jim Hanson: bass, background vocals
- Steuart Smith: electric and acoustic guitar
- Richard Bennett: acoustic guitar, mandolin guitar O Phone
- Vince Santoro: tambourine, cardboard box, background vocals
- Barbara Santoro: background vocals
- Michael Rhodes: bass, upright bass, Washburn acoustic bass
- John Stewart: acoustic guitar
- Michael Lawler: keyboards
- Tommy Spurlock: steel guitar
- Michael Blustone: shaker
- Jim Photoglo: background vocals
- Kristen DeLauer: background vocals
- John Barlow Jarvis: piano, keyboards
- John Leventhal: guitar
- Larry Campbell: mandolin
- Clifford Carter: keyboards
- Zev Katz: bass
- Dennis McDermott: drums

== Charts ==
=== Weekly charts ===
Chart (1990)	Peak position
US Billboard 200	175
US Top Country Albums (Billboard)	23

=== Year-end charts ===
Chart (1991)	Position
US Top Country Albums (Billboard)	58
