= I Don't Want to Spoil the Party =

1964 single by the Beatles

- US picture sleeve (reverse)

Single by the Beatles

from the album Beatles VI
- A-side: "Eight Days a Week"
- Released: 4 December 1964 (UK Beatles for Sale album); 15 February 1965 (US single)
- Recorded: 29 September 1964
- Studio: EMI, London
- Genre: Country rock, pop rock
- Length: 2:33
- Label: Capitol
- Songwriter: Lennon–McCartney
- Producer: George Martin

The Beatles US singles chronology
| "I Feel Fine" (1964) | "Eight Days a Week" / "I Don't Want to Spoil the Party" (1965) | "Ticket to Ride" (1965) |

"I Don't Want to Spoil the Party" is a song by the English rock band the Beatles, written by John Lennon and credited to Lennon–McCartney. It was featured as the twelfth track on the 1964 album Beatles for Sale. "I Don't Want to Spoil the Party" was also released on the Beatles for Sale (No. 2) EP. It was later released as the B-side of the US single "Eight Days a Week", and then as the fifth track on the North America-only album Beatles VI. The song reached number 39 on the Billboard Hot 100.

== Lyrics ==
The lyrics anticipate themes that were to become familiar in Lennon's songwriting – alienation and inner pain. In this song, the narrator is at a party, waiting for his girl to show up. When it becomes clear that she has stood him up, he decides to leave, rather than spoil the party for everyone else. Both the lyrics and melody share a melancholy sound and theme with songs that precede it on Beatles for Sale, such as "No Reply" and "I'm a Loser". Author Ian MacDonald views the song as a return to the subject matter introduced by Lennon on "I'll Cry Instead", from the Beatles' A Hard Day's Night album, and a "preview" of "You've Got to Hide Your Love Away", from Help!

== Recording ==
The Beatles recorded "I Don't Want to Spoil the Party" on 29 September 1964 in 19 takes, the last of which was released. George Harrison's guitar solo, played on his new Gretsch Tennessean in the style of Carl Perkins, was enhanced by midrange resonance boost, giving it an especially bright sound. According to The Encyclopedia of Country Music, the song is an early example of country rock, anticipating the Byrds' work in that style. MacDonald describes it as the "most overt" country track on Beatles for Sale, an album that is "dominated by the idiom".

Among the band's biographers, opinions differ on which Beatle sings the low harmony part during the verses, below Lennon's lead vocal. MacDonald lists Harrison as the second vocalist on the track, while John Winn credits McCartney, saying that he sounds "deceptively like a second Lennon". According to musicologist Walter Everett, the harmony part is Lennon "self-duetting".

== Reception ==
Cash Box described it as "a funky, country-bluesish teen-angled tear-jerker."

== Personnel ==
According to Walter Everett: except where noted

- John Lennon – lead vocals, harmony vocals (high octave for the verses, low octave for the chorus), acoustic rhythm guitar
- Paul McCartney – harmony vocals (low octave for the verses, high octave for the chorus), backing vocals, bass
- George Harrison – backing vocals, lead guitar
- Ringo Starr – drums, tambourine

== Chart positions ==
| Chart (1965) | Peak position |
|---|---|
| US Billboard Hot 100 | 39 |

== Rosanne Cash version ==
"I Don't Want to Spoil the Party"

Single by Rosanne Cash

from the album Hits 1979-1989
- B-side: "Look What Our Love Is Coming To"
- Released: 1989
- Genre: Country
- Length: 2:36
- Label: Columbia
- Songwriter: Lennon–McCartney
- Producers: Rodney Crowell, Rosanne Cash

Rosanne Cash singles chronology
| "Runaway Train" (1988) | "I Don't Want to Spoil the Party" (1989) | "Black and White" (1989) |

Rosanne Cash covered the song for her Hits 1979-1989 compilation. Her version went to number one on Billboard's Hot Country Songs chart in 1989. It was also Cash's last number one hit to date, and is the only Lennon-McCartney song to top the country chart.

=== Chart positions ===
| Chart (1989) | Peak position |
|---|---|
| Canada Country Singles (RPM) | 1 |
| US Hot Country Songs (Billboard) | 1 |

=== Year-end charts ===
| Chart (1989) | Position |
|---|---|
| Canada Country Tracks (RPM) | 23 |
| US Country Songs (Billboard) | 16 |
