= Rosanne Cash (album) =

Studio album by Rosanne Cash
- Released: December 15, 1978
- Studio: Union Studios, Munich; Country Lane Studios, Munich; American Studios, Nashville, Tennessee
- Genre: Country
- Label: Ariola
- Producer: Rodney Crowell, Bernd Vonficht

Rosanne Cash chronology
| Rosanne Cash (1978) | Right or Wrong (1979) |

Rosanne Cash is the self-titled debut album of American country music artist Rosanne Cash, released on December 15, 1978. The album was never issued in the U.S. It was her only album for the German based Ariola Records, and the first to feature Rodney Crowell, who went on to produce many of Cash's other albums. In 1979, after that album's release, Cash signed contracts with Columbia Records.

== Track listing ==
Rosanne Cash track listing
| No. | Title | Length |
|---|---|---|
| 1. | "Baby, Better Start Turnin' Em Down" | 4:06 |
| 2. | "Take Me, Take Me" | 3:40 |
| 3. | "So Fine" | 3:20 |
| 4. | "Thoughts from the Train" | 3:45 |
| 5. | "Understand Your Man" | 3:23 |
| 6. | "I'm Ragged but I'm Right" | 2:45 |
| 7. | "Anybody's Darlin' (Anything but Mine)" | 5:10 |
| 8. | "Feelin' Blue" | 3:59 |
| 9. | "We Can Do What We Like" | 3:43 |
| 10. | "Baby We Can Be Friends" | 2:32 |
| 11. | "Can I Still Believe in You" | 5:35 |
| Total length: | | 47:58 |

== Personnel ==
- Rosanne Cash - acoustic guitar, vocals
- Jerry McKeun - acoustic and electric guitar, electric piano
- Mats Björkland - acoustic and electric guitar
- Frank Baum - pedal steel
- Rodney Crowell - acoustic guitar, arrangements on "So Fine", "Understand Your Man" and "Can I Still Believe in You"
- Sigi Schwab - acoustic guitar, banjo
- Bee Spears, Dave King - bass
- Charly Ricanek - piano, Fender Rhodes, celesta, synthesizer, arrangements
- Buck White - piano, mandolin
- Jerry Kroon, Keith Forsey - drums
- Joseph Spector, Mario Argandoña - percussion
- Giuseppe Solera - harmonica
- Hannes Beckmann - electric violin
- Siegfried Meinecke - viola
- Franz Fischer - cello
- Timothy Touchton - harmony vocals
- Carlene Carter, Larry Willoughby, Wolly Emperhoff - backing vocals

Technical

- Frank von dem Bottlenberg, Harry Thumann, Zeke Lund - engineer
- Mal Luker - mixing
