= What We Really Want =

Single by Rosanne Cash

from the album Interiors
- B-side: "Portrait"
- Released: September 29, 1990
- Genre: Country
- Length: 3:29
- Label: Columbia
- Songwriter(s): Rosanne Cash
- Producer(s): Rosanne Cash

Rosanne Cash singles chronology
"One Step Over the Line" (1990)	"What We Really Want" (1990)	"On the Surface" (1991)

"What We Really Want" is a song written and recorded by American country music artist Rosanne Cash. It was released in September 1990 as the first single from the album Interiors. The song reached #39 on the Billboard Hot Country Singles & Tracks chart.

== Chart performance ==
Chart (1990)	Peak position
US Hot Country Songs (Billboard)	39
Canadian RPM Country Tracks	24
