= Ain't No Money =

Single by Rosanne Cash

from the album Somewhere in the Stars
- B-side: "The Feelin'"
- Released: May 29, 1982
- Genre: Country
- Length: 3:27
- Label: Columbia
- Songwriter(s): Rodney Crowell
- Producer(s): Rodney Crowell

Rosanne Cash singles chronology
"Blue Moon with Heartache" (1981)	"Ain't No Money" (1982)	"I Wonder" (1982)

"Ain't No Money" is a song written and originally recorded by Rodney Crowell. It was released as a single in 1980 from his album But What Will the Neighbors Think, but it did not chart.

It was later covered by American country music artist Rosanne Cash. It was released in May 1982 as the first single from the album Somewhere in the Stars. The song reached number 4 on the Billboard Hot Country Singles & Tracks chart.

== Charts ==
=== Weekly charts ===
Chart (1982)	Peak position
US Hot Country Songs (Billboard)	4
Canadian RPM Country Tracks	5

=== Year-end charts ===
Chart (1982)	Position
US Hot Country Songs (Billboard)	44
