= I Wonder (Rosanne Cash song) =

Single by Rosanne Cash

from the album Somewhere in the Stars
- B-side: "Oh Yes I Can"
- Released: October 9, 1982
- Genre: Country
- Length: 3:05
- Label: Columbia
- Songwriter(s): Leroy Preston
- Producer(s): Rodney Crowell

Rosanne Cash singles chronology
"Ain't No Money" (1982)	"I Wonder" (1982)	"It Hasn't Happened Yet" (1983)

"I Wonder" is a song written by Leroy Preston, and recorded by American country music artist Rosanne Cash. It was released in October 1982 as the second single from the album Somewhere in the Stars. The song reached #8 on the Billboard Hot Country Singles & Tracks chart.

== Chart performance ==
Chart (1982–1983)	Peak position
US Hot Country Songs (Billboard)	8
Canadian RPM Country Tracks	14
