= The Wheel (Rosanne Cash album) =

Studio album by Rosanne Cash
- Released: January 19, 1993
- Recorded: N/A
- Genre: Country, folk
- Length: 44:39
- Label: Columbia
- Producer: Rosanne Cash, John Leventhal

Rosanne Cash chronology
Interiors (1990)	The Wheel (1993)	10 Song Demo (1996)

Professional ratings
Review scores
Source	Rating
AllMusic	4.5/5 stars
Christgau's Consumer Guide	A−
Entertainment Weekly	A−
Rolling Stone	4/5 stars
The Rolling Stone Album Guide	4/5 stars

The Wheel is the eighth studio album by singer-songwriter Rosanne Cash. Most of the songs on the album reflected Cash's feelings on embarking on a new relationship (with music producer John Leventhal, whom she would eventually marry) after the dissolution of her marriage to Rodney Crowell.

== Reception and legacy ==
Though neither of its two singles, "The Wheel" and "You Won't Let Me In", charted on the Billboard Hot Country Singles & Tracks chart, the album received considerable critical acclaim. A video was produced for "The Wheel".

In 2026, the album was selected by the Library of Congress for preservation in the National Recording Registry for its "cultural, historical or aesthetic importance in the nation's recorded sound heritage."

== Track listing ==
All songs by Rosanne Cash, except where noted.

1. "The Wheel" – 4:20
2. "Seventh Avenue" (Rosanne Cash, John Leventhal) – 5:14
3. "Change Partners" – 3:41
4. "Sleeping in Paris" – 4:06
5. "You Won't Let Me In" – 4:31
6. "From the Ashes" – 3:58
7. "The Truth About You" (Cash, Leventhal) – 2:29
8. "Tears Falling Down" (Cash, Leventhal) – 3:27
9. "Roses in the Fire" – 3:25
10. "Fire of the Newly Alive" (Cash, Leventhal) – 4:28
11. "If There's a God on My Side" – 4:51

== Musicians ==
- Rosanne Cash – vocals, acoustic guitar
- Benmont Tench – piano, keyboards
- Mary Chapin Carpenter – background vocals
- Patty Larkin – background vocals
- Marc Cohn – harmony vocals
- Bruce Cockburn – harmony vocals
- John Leventhal – guitars, mandolin, bass guitar, piano, organ, keyboards, harmonica, percussion, background vocals
- Steuart Smith – guitar, acoustic guitar
- Lincoln Shleifer – bass guitar
- Zev Katz – bass guitar, acoustic bass
- Frank Vilardi – drums, percussion
- Steve Gaboury – organ
- Charlie Giordano – accordion
- Dennis McDermott – drums
- Tommy Malone – harmony vocals
- Catherine Russell – background vocals

== Charts ==
Chart (1993)	Peak position
U.S. Billboard Top Country Albums	37
U.S. Billboard 200	160
