= Hold On (Rosanne Cash song) =

Single by Rosanne Cash

from the album Rhythm & Romance
- B-side: "Never Gonna Hurt"
- Released: February 15, 1986
- Genre: Country
- Length: 3:38
- Label: Columbia
- Songwriter(s): Rosanne Cash
- Producer(s): Rodney Crowell

Rosanne Cash singles chronology
"Never Be You" (1986)	"Hold On" (1986)	"Second to No One" (1986)

"Hold On" is a song written and recorded by American country music artist Rosanne Cash. It was released in February 1986 as the third single from the album Rhythm & Romance. The song reached #5 on the Billboard Hot Country Singles & Tracks chart.

== Chart performance ==
Chart (1986)	Peak position
US Hot Country Songs (Billboard)	5
Canadian RPM Country Tracks	6
