= Seven Year Ache =

Studio album by Rosanne Cash
- Released: February 27, 1981
- Recorded: 1980
- Studio: Davlen, Sherman Oaks; Magnolia, North Hollywood
- Genre: Country
- Length: 32:45
- Label: Columbia (United States/Canada); Ariola (international)
- Producer: Rodney Crowell

Rosanne Cash chronology
Right or Wrong (1979)	Seven Year Ache (1981)	Somewhere in the Stars (1982)

Singles from Seven Year Ache
- 1. "Seven Year Ache" Released: February 15, 1981; 2. "My Baby Thinks He's a Train" Released: August 29, 1981; 3. "Blue Moon with Heartache" Released: December 19, 1981

Professional ratings
Review scores
Source	Rating
AllMusic	4.5/5 stars
Rolling Stone	4/5 stars
Stylus Magazine	B+
Uncut	8/10
The Village Voice	B+

Seven Year Ache is the third studio album by American country music singer Rosanne Cash, and her second for Columbia Records. It was released on February 27, 1981, and reached number one on the Billboard country album chart. Three singles were released from her album; in the order of the singles' release they were: the title track, "My Baby Thinks He's a Train", and "Blue Moon with Heartache". To promote the album, Cash hit the talk show circuit starting with her appearance on The Merv Griffin Show. The album was mastered a few days following the murder of John Lennon. As a tribute to Lennon, Cash asked the mastering engineer to scratch the message “Goodbye, John” into the run-out groove of the mother vinyl. This etching was limited to the first 25,000 copies of the album.

The CD was reissued in 2005 in an edition which was part of the American Milestone series from Sony BMG, which later identified the reissue as being among the 52 CD titles that were deemed to have been shipped with Extended Copy Protection (XCP) computer software. As a result, all Microsoft Windows computer that were used to play the reissue are likely to have had XCP installed. This can cause a number of serious security problems. Several security software vendors, including Microsoft, regard XCP as a trojan horse, spyware, or rootkit. Sony discontinued use of the technology on November 11, 2005, and recalled this and other titles affected by XCP, and asked customers to submit copies affected by the software to the company so that it could replace them with copies that did not contain the software.

== Track listing ==
No.	Title	Writer(s)	Length
1.	"Rainin'"	Keith Sykes	2:54
2.	"Seven Year Ache"	Rosanne Cash	3:15
3.	"Blue Moon with Heartache"	Cash	4:28
4.	"What Kinda Girl?"	Steve Forbert	2:47
5.	"You Don't Have Very Far to Go"	Merle Haggard, Red Simpson	2:35
6.	"My Baby Thinks He's a Train"	Leroy Preston	3:13
7.	"Only Human"	Sykes	4:00
8.	"Where Will the Words Come From?"	Glen Hardin, Sonny Curtis	2:45
9.	"Hometown Blues"	Tom Petty	2:58
10.	"I Can't Resist"	Hank DeVito, Rodney Crowell	3:25

== Personnel ==
- Rosanne Cash - vocals
- Tony Brown - electric piano
- Rodney Crowell - guitar, harmony vocals
- Vince Gill - harmony vocals
- Emmylou Harris - harmony vocals
- Booker T. Jones - organ, synthesizer
- Albert Lee - acoustic and electric guitar
- Mickey Raphael - harmonica
- Ricky Skaggs - harmony vocals
- Rosemary Butler - harmony vocals
- Hank DeVito - electric and steel guitar
- Janis Gill - harmony vocals
- Emory Gordy Jr. - guitar, mandolin, bass, piano, string arrangements
- Glen Hardin - piano
- Phil Kenzie - saxophone
- Maxayn Lewis - harmony vocals
- Larrie Londin - drums
- Jerry McGee - electric guitar
- Milah's Bros. - handclapping
- Frank Reckard - electric guitar

Technical

- Arlene Katz, Emory Gordy Jr., Hank DeVito - production assistance
- Donivan Cowart, Bradley Hartman - engineers

== Charts ==
=== Weekly charts ===
Chart (1981)	Peak position
US Billboard 200	26
US Top Country Albums (Billboard)	1

=== Year-end charts ===
Chart (1981)	Position
US Top Country Albums (Billboard)	14
Chart (1982)	Position
US Top Country Albums (Billboard)	26
