= Right or Wrong (Rosanne Cash album) =

Studio album by Rosanne Cash
- Released: 1980
- Studios: Enactron Truck, Los Angeles, California
- Genre: Country
- Length: 37:25
- Label: Columbia
- Producer: Rodney Crowell

Rosanne Cash chronology
Rosanne Cash (1978)	Right or Wrong (1980)	Seven Year Ache (1981)

Singles from Right or Wrong
- 1. "No Memories Hangin' Round" Released: September 8, 1979; 2. "Couldn't Do Nothin' Right" Released: February 2, 1980

Right or Wrong is the second studio album by American country music singer Rosanne Cash. It was released in 1980 by Columbia Records.

The three highest charting Billboard country tracks were "Couldn't Do Nothin' Right" at No. 15, "No Memories Hangin' 'Round", a duet with Bobby Bare, at No. 17, and "Take Me, Take Me" at No. 25. The album peaked at No. 42 on the Billboard Top Country Albums chart.

== Critical reception ==
Professional ratings
Review scores
Source	Rating
AllMusic	4/5 stars
Christgau's Record Guide	B
The Encyclopedia of Popular Music	3/5 stars
MusicHound Rock: The Essential Album Guide	4/5 stars
The Rolling Stone Album Guide	3/5 stars
Spin Alternative Record Guide	4/10

AllMusic wrote that Rodney Crowell and Cash "made the song selections while Rodney called in Emmylou Harris's band (of which he was an alumnus) and some up and comers and created a sonic palette that accented the brave new world of stripped-down mixes and songs that came from the left field of country or pop." Pitchfork wrote that Right or Wrong "kicked off a decade of untouchable albums." Orange Coast praised the "smooth, satisfying vocal performance."

== Track listing ==
No.	Title	Writer(s)	Length
1.	"Right or Wrong"	Keith Sykes	3:22
2.	"Take Me, Take Me"	Sykes	3:37
3.	"Man Smart, Woman Smarter"	Norman Span (King Radio))	2:55
4.	"This Has Happened Before"	Rosanne Cash	3:55
5.	"Baby, Better Start Turnin' Em Down"	Rodney Crowell	4:08
6.	"No Memories Hangin' Round" (duet with Bobby Bare)	Crowell	3:24
7.	"Couldn't Do Nothin' Right"	Karen Brooks, Gary P. Nunn	4:48
8.	"Seeing's Believing"	Crowell	3:28
9.	"Big River"	Johnny Cash	2:45
10.	"Anybody's Darlin' (Anything but Mine)"	Crowell	5:03

== Personnel ==
- Rosanne Cash - Vocals, Acoustic Guitar
- Rodney Crowell - Acoustic Guitar, Harmony Vocals
- Emmylou Harris - Harmony Vocals
- Bobby Bare - Vocals
- Hal Blaine - Drums
- James Burton - Electric Guitar
- Ricky Skaggs - Acoustic Guitar, Mandolin, Fiddle
- Jim Horn - Flute, Saxophone
- Albert Lee - Guitar
- Mickey Raphael - Harmonica
- Brian Ahern - Acoustic Guitar
- Tony Brown - Piano
- Rosemary Butler - Harmony Vocals
- Donivan Cowert - Harmony Vocals
- Hank DeVito - Acoustic Guitar, Slide Guitar
- Emory Gordy Jr. - Bass, Organ, String Arrangements
- Glen Hardin - Electric Piano
- Sharon Hicks - Vocals
- Frank Reckard - Electric Guitar
- Aldo Strucci - Electric Guitar
- John Ware - Drums
- Cheryl Warren - Vocals
- Larry Willoughby - Harmony Vocals
