= No Memories Hangin' Round =

Single by Rosanne Cash with Bobby Bare

from the album Right or Wrong
- B-side: "This Has Happened Before"
- Released: September 8, 1979
- Genre: Country
- Length: 3:26
- Label: Columbia
- Songwriter(s): Rodney Crowell
- Producer(s): Rodney Crowell

Rosanne Cash singles chronology
"Thoughts from a Train" (1978)	"No Memories Hangin' Round" (1979)	"Couldn't Do Nothin' Right" (1980)

Bobby Bare singles chronology
"Healin'" (1979)	"No Memories Hangin' Round" (1979)	"Numbers" (1980)

"No Memories Hangin' Round" is a song written by Rodney Crowell, and recorded as a duet by American country music artists Rosanne Cash and Bobby Bare. It was released in September 1979 as the first single from the album Right or Wrong. The song reached number 17 on the Billboard Hot Country Singles & Tracks chart.

== Chart performance ==
Chart (1979)	Peak position
US Hot Country Songs (Billboard)	17
Canadian RPM Country Tracks	38
