= Seven Year Ache (song) =

Single by Rosanne Cash

from the album Seven Year Ache
- B-side: "Blue Moon with Heartache" "Rainin'" (international)
- Released: February 1981
- Recorded: 1980
- Genre: Country pop
- Length: 3:15
- Label: Columbia; Ariola (international)
- Songwriter: Rosanne Cash
- Producer: Rodney Crowell

Rosanne Cash singles chronology
"Take Me, Take Me" (1980)	"Seven Year Ache" (1981)	"My Baby Thinks He's a Train" (1981)

"Seven Year Ache" is a song written and recorded by American country music artist Rosanne Cash. It was released in February 1981 as the first single and title track from Cash's album of the same name. The song was Cash's first of ten No. 1 hits on the US Country charts and also crossed over to the Billboard Hot 100 and adult contemporary charts.

== Critical reception ==
In 2024, Rolling Stone ranked the song at #73 on its 200 Greatest Country Songs of All Time ranking.

== Commercial performance ==
"Seven Year Ache" was Cash's fourth single and her first single released in 1981. Considered her breakthrough recording, the song was Cash's first No. 1 on the Billboard Country Chart, while also crossing over to the Billboard Pop Chart, reaching No. 22. It was also a Top 10 Adult contemporary hit, cresting at No. 6.

The single was issued on Cash's second studio album, Seven Year Ache that year, which also produced the No. 1 hits "My Baby Thinks He's a Train" and "Blue Moon with Heartache."

== Charts ==
Chart (1981)	Peak position
US Hot Country Songs (Billboard)	1
US Billboard Hot 100	22
US Adult Contemporary (Billboard)	6
Canadian RPM Country Singles	6

Year-end chart (1981)	Rank
US Top Pop Singles (Billboard)	97

== Notable cover versions ==
"Seven Year Ache" has been recorded several times. American country artist Trisha Yearwood recorded a version for her 2001 album Inside Out that featured Cash herself singing background vocals. Miranda Lambert and Parker McCollum recorded the song as a duet for Lambert's Crisco album in 2026.
