= 10 Song Demo =

Studio album by Rosanne Cash
- Released: April 2, 1996
- Genre: Country, folk
- Length: 35:28
- Label: Capitol
- Producer: Rosanne Cash, John Leventhal

Rosanne Cash chronology
The Wheel (1993)	10 Song Demo (1996)	Rules of Travel (2003)

10 Song Demo is an album by the American musician Rosanne Cash. Released in 1996, it was her first album for Capitol Records. The album's first single, "The Summer I Read Collette", is a tribute to French novelist Sidonie-Gabrielle Colette. Its second and final single, "Western Wall", was covered by Emmylou Harris and Linda Ronstadt on Western Wall: The Tucson Sessions.

== Critical reception ==
Professional ratings
Review scores
Source	Rating
AllMusic	4/5 stars
Robert Christgau	(2-star Honorable Mention)
The Encyclopedia of Popular Music	4/5 stars

No Depression wrote that "her voice and person completely dominate, and even when the literary lyrics border on being sappy or overly articulate, the sheer force of Cash’s persona makes it work." Entertainment Weekly determined that "unlike, say, Bruce Springsteen, she knows that bare-bones doesn’t mean tuneless ... Demo's spare arrangements reinforce the sturdiness of her melodies."

== Track listing ==
All songs by Rosanne Cash except as indicated.

1. "Price of Temptation" – 2:12
2. "If I Were a Man" – 3:20
3. "The Summer I Read Collette" – 3:28
4. "Western Wall" – 3:00
5. "Bells & Roses" – 3:04
6. "List of Burdens" – 3:04
7. "Child of Steel" (live) – 3:36
8. "Just Don't Talk About It" (Rosanne Cash, John Leventhal) – 3:48
9. "I Want to Know" – 3:17
10. "Take My Body" – 3:52
11. "Mid-Air" (live) – 2:37

== Musicians ==
- Rosanne Cash: Vocals, Acoustic guitar, Piano
- Larry Campbell: Acoustic & electric guitar, Background vocals
- John Leventhal: Acoustic & electric guitar, Bass, Keyboards, Percussion
- Lincoln Schleifer: Bass, Percussion
