= Rhythm & Romance (Rosanne Cash album) =

Studio album by Rosanne Cash
- Released: May 6, 1985
- Genre: Country
- Length: 34:04
- Label: Columbia
- Producer: David Malloy, Rodney Crowell, David Thoener

Rosanne Cash chronology
Somewhere in the Stars (1982)	Rhythm & Romance (1985)	King's Record Shop (1987)

Singles from Rhythm & Romance
- 1. "I Don't Know Why You Don't Want Me" Released: February 6, 1985; 2. "Never Be You" Released: September 12, 1985; 3. "Hold On" Released: February 15, 1986; 4. "Second to No One" Released: July 19, 1986

Professional ratings
Review scores
Source	Rating
AllMusic	link
Rolling Stone	Mixed link

Rhythm & Romance was the fifth studio album by American singer-songwriter Rosanne Cash. It was released on Columbia Records on May 6, 1985; her fourth album for the label. The album's first single "I Don't Know Why You Don't Want Me" was released on February 6, 1985, winning Cash her first Grammy award. The second single; "Never Be You" was released on September 12, 1985, the third single; "Hold On" was released on February 15, 1986; the album's fourth and final single; "Second to No One" was released on July 19, 1986.

Although Cash had written at least one composition on each of her previous albums, this is the first of her albums on which she wrote or co-wrote the majority of the tracks.

== Tracks listing ==
All tracks written by Rosanne Cash, except where noted.

No.	Title	Writer(s)	Length
1.	"Hold On"		3:36
2.	"I Don't Know Why You Don't Want Me"	Cash, Rodney Crowell	3:17
3.	"Never Be You"	Benmont Tench, Tom Petty	3:28
4.	"Second to No One"		3:46
5.	"Halfway House"		4:24
6.	"Pink Bedroom"	John Hiatt	3:09
7.	"Never Alone"	Cash, Vince Gill	3:38
8.	"My Old Man"		2:52
9.	"Never Gonna Hurt"		3:05
10.	"Closing Time"		2:49

== Personnel ==
- Rosanne Cash: Vocals
- Anton Fig: Drums
- Vince Gill: Background Vocals
- David Hungate: Bass
- Jennifer Kimball: Background Vocals
- Benmont Tench: Electric Piano
- Waddy Wachtel: Electric Guitar
- Larry Crane: Guitar
- Anthony Crawford: Background Vocals
- Patricia Darcy: Background Vocals
- Bob Glaub: Bass
- Steve Goldstein: Keyboards
- Ula Hedwig: Background Vocals
- Dave Innis: Keyboards
- Paul Leim: Drums
- Randy McCormick: Keyboards
- Robert Sabino: Synthesizer
- Billy Joe Walker Jr.: Electric Guitar
- Willie Weeks: Bass

== Charts ==
=== Weekly charts ===
Chart (1985)	Peak position
US Billboard 200	101
US Top Country Albums (Billboard)	1

=== Year-end charts ===
Chart (1985)	Position
US Top Country Albums (Billboard)	36
Chart (1986)	Position
US Top Country Albums (Billboard)	7
