= Never Be You =

Single by Rosanne Cash

from the album Rhythm & Romance
- B-side: "Closing Time"
- Released: September 1985
- Genre: Country; pop rock
- Length: 3:28
- Label: Columbia
- Songwriters: Benmont Tench; Tom Petty
- Producers: David Malloy; Rodney Crowell; David Thoener

Rosanne Cash singles chronology
"I Don't Know Why You Don't Want Me" (1985)	"Never Be You" (1985)	"Hold On" (1986)

"Never Be You" is a song written by Tom Petty and Benmont Tench and was first released in 1983 by Maria McKee. The song appeared on the Streets of Fire (1984) film soundtrack album and was recorded by American country music artist Rosanne Cash. Cash recorded a version for the film, but her version was not used. Cash's version was released in September 1985 as the second single from the album Rhythm & Romance. The song was Cash's fifth number one on the country chart. The single went to number one for one week and spent a total of 16 weeks on the chart.

== Chart performance ==
Chart (1985–1986)	Peak position
US Hot Country Songs (Billboard)	1
Canadian RPM Country Tracks	2
