= I Don't Know Why You Don't Want Me =

Single by Rosanne Cash

from the album Rhythm & Romance
- B-side: "What You Gonna Do About It"
- Released: February 1985
- Genre: Country
- Length: 3:17
- Label: Columbia
- Songwriter(s): Rosanne Cash; Rodney Crowell
- Producer(s): David Malloy

Rosanne Cash singles chronology
"It Hasn't Happened Yet" (1983)	"I Don't Know Why You Don't Want Me" (1985)	"Never Be You" (1985)

"I Don't Know Why You Don't Want Me" is a song co-written and recorded by American country music artist Rosanne Cash. It was released in February 1985 as the first single from the album Rhythm & Romance. The song was Cash's fourth number one on the country charts. The single stayed at number one for a single week and spent a total of 15 weeks in the top 40. Cash wrote the song with then-husband Rodney Crowell. In 1986, the song - which was written by Cash in response to losing a Grammy to Juice Newton in 1983 - garnered Rosanne Cash her first Grammy Award.

== Charts ==
=== Weekly charts ===
Chart (1985)	Peak position
US Adult Contemporary (Billboard)	16
US Hot Country Songs (Billboard)	1
Canadian RPM Country Tracks	1

=== Year-end charts ===
Chart (1985)	Position
US Hot Country Songs (Billboard)	11
