= My Baby Thinks He's a Train =

Single by Rosanne Cash

from the album Seven Year Ache
- B-side: "I Can't Resist"
- Released: Augus 1981
- Genre: Country
- Length: 3:13
- Label: Columbia
- Songwriter: Leroy Preston
- Producer: Rodney Crowell

Rosanne Cash singles chronology
"Seven Year Ache" (1981)	"My Baby Thinks He's a Train" (1981)	"Blue Moon with Heartache" (1981)

"My Baby Thinks He's a Train" is a song written by Leroy Preston, and recorded by the American country music artist Rosanne Cash. It was released in August 1981 as the second single from the album Seven Year Ache. The song was Cash's second number one on the country chart. The single stayed at number one for a single week and spent a total of 11 weeks on the country chart.

== Charts ==
Chart (1981)	Peak position
US Hot Country Songs (Billboard)	1
Canadian RPM Country Tracks	4
