= Blue Moon with Heartache =

Single by Rosanne Cash

from the album Seven Year Ache
- B-side: "Only Human"
- Released: December 19, 1981
- Genre: Country
- Length: 4:29
- Label: Columbia
- Songwriter: Rosanne Cash
- Producer: Rodney Crowell

Rosanne Cash singles chronology
"My Baby Thinks He's a Train" (1981)	"Blue Moon with Heartache" (1981)	"Ain't No Money" (1982)

"Blue Moon with Heartache" is a song written and recorded by American country music artist Rosanne Cash. It was released in December 1981 as the third single from the album Seven Year Ache. The song was Cash's third number one country hit. The single stayed at number one for a single week and spent a total of 11 weeks on the chart.

== Charts ==
=== Weekly charts ===
Chart (1981–1982)	Peak position
US Hot Country Songs (Billboard)	1
Canadian RPM Country Tracks	2
US Adult Contemporary (Billboard)	37

=== Year-end charts ===
Chart (1982)	Position
US Hot Country Songs (Billboard)	41
