= John Leventhal =

American musician, producer and songwriter (born 1952)

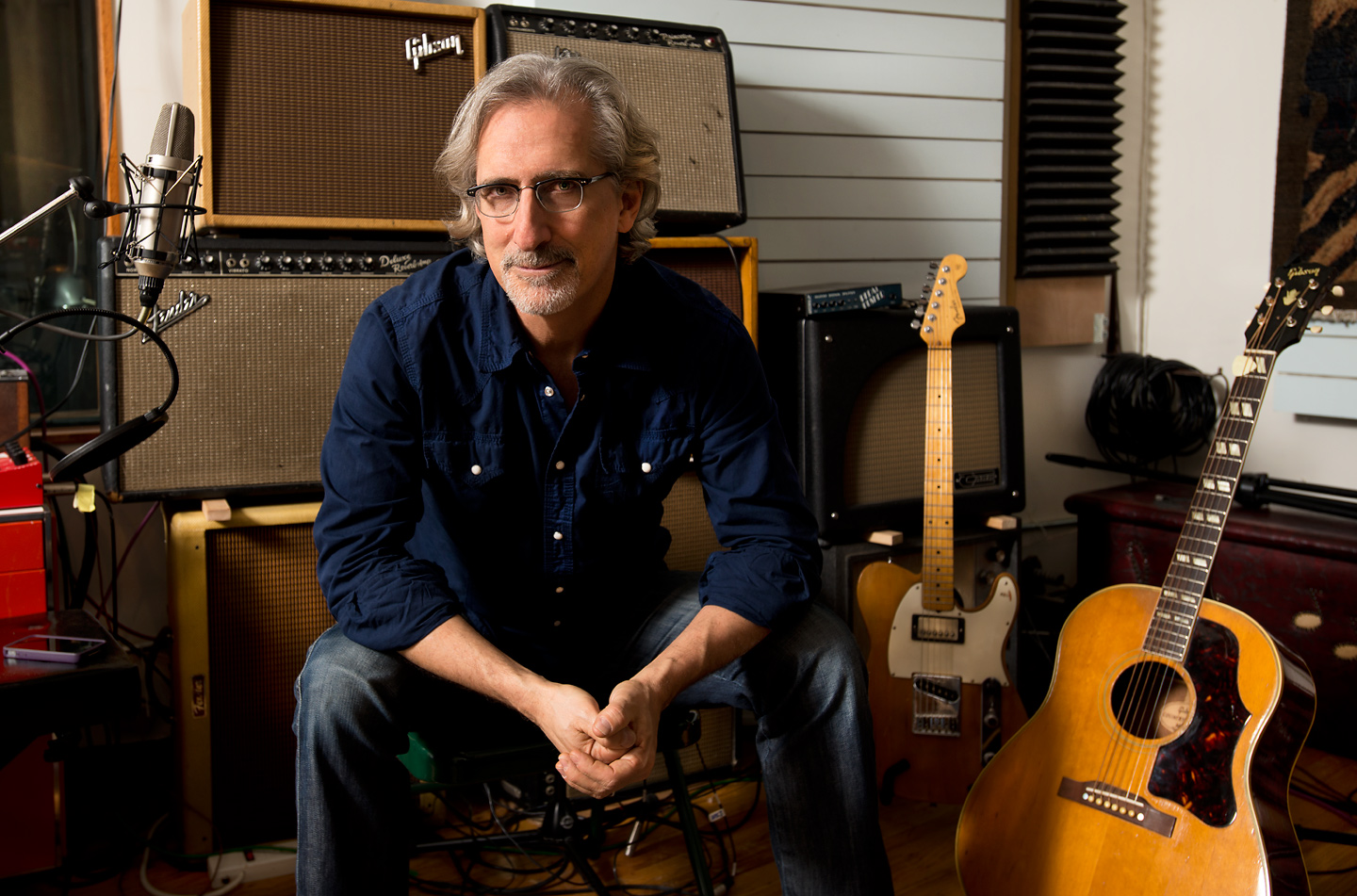
- Leventhal in 2013

Background information
- Born: December 18, 1952 (age 73); New York City, U.S.
- Genres: Country; Americana
- Occupations: Musician; composer; record producer; audio engineer
- Instruments: Guitar; bass guitar; keyboard instruments; drums
- Spouse: Rosanne Cash (m. 1995)

John Leventhal (born December 18, 1952) is an American musician, producer, songwriter, and recording engineer who has produced albums for William Bell, The Blind Boys of Alabama, Michelle Branch, Rosanne Cash, Marc Cohn, Shawn Colvin, Sarah Jarosz, Rodney Crowell, Jim Lauderdale, Joan Osborne, Loudon Wainwright III and The Wreckers. As of 2021, he has won six Grammy Awards.

== Career ==
Leventhal began his career in late 1970s New York City, playing guitar in dozens of bands including those led by Billy Vera, Steve Forbert, and Levon Helm. In the 1980s, he developed a songwriting partnership with Shawn Colvin which led to his producing her 1989 debut album Steady On, which won the 1991 Grammy Award for Best Contemporary Folk Recording. He arranged and played multiple instruments on Marc Cohn's 1991 hit "Walking in Memphis".

In 1998, he won a Grammy for both Record and Song of the Year for producing and co-writing the song "Sunny Came Home", a 1997 hit for Colvin. Leventhal produced and co-wrote Rosanne Cash's 2014 release The River & the Thread, which won two 2015 Grammy Awards: Best Americana Album and Best American Roots Song for "A Feather's Not a Bird".

He produced and co-wrote soul singer William Bell's 2016 Stax Records release This Is Where I Live, which won the 2017 Grammy for Best Americana Album. In 2018, Leventhal produced the song "Let My Mother Live", co-written with Marc Cohn and performed by The Blind Boys of Alabama; the song was nominated for a 2018 Grammy for Best American Roots Performance. The song "Crossing To Jerusalem", written with Rosanne Cash, was nominated for Best American Roots song at the 2020 Grammys. Sarah Jarosz's album World on the Ground, produced by Leventhal, won the 2021 Grammy for Best Americana Album.

As a musician, he has recorded and performed with such artists as Jackson Browne, Willie Nelson, Bruce Hornsby, Elvis Costello, Dolly Parton, Emmylou Harris, Charlie Haden, David Crosby, Levon Helm, Edie Brickell, Paul Simon, Patty Larkin, Susan Tedeschi, the Tedeschi Trucks Band, Steve Forbert, Kelly Willis, Donald Fagen, Ry Cooder, and Johnny Cash.

As a songwriter, over 200 of his songs have been recorded by various artists, including Rosanne Cash, Shawn Colvin, Marc Cohn, Michelle Branch, The Tedeschi Trucks Band, Vince Gill, George Strait, Shelby Lynne, Patty Loveless, Jim Lauderdale, Joe Cocker and William Bell.

Leventhal has produced albums that have been nominated for a total of 19 Grammy Awards.

In September 2015, Leventhal received the Americana Music Association's award for Instrumentalist of the Year.

Leventhal also composed scores to the films Winter Solstice (2004) and Big Stone Gap (2014).

On January 26, 2024, Leventhal released his debut solo album Rumble Strip (RumbleStrip Records).

On October 2, 2026, he released his second album National Drift (Rumble Strip Records).

== Personal life ==
Leventhal lives with his wife Rosanne Cash and their children in New York City.

Leventhal's mother was of Irish and Cuban descent, and his father was Jewish. In 2014, Newsweek reported "Before [Leventhal and Cash] were married by a rabbi, Johnny Cash said, 'I've been waiting 40 years for one of my daughters to marry a Jew.'"
