= Rosanne Cash =

American singer-songwriter and author (born 1955)

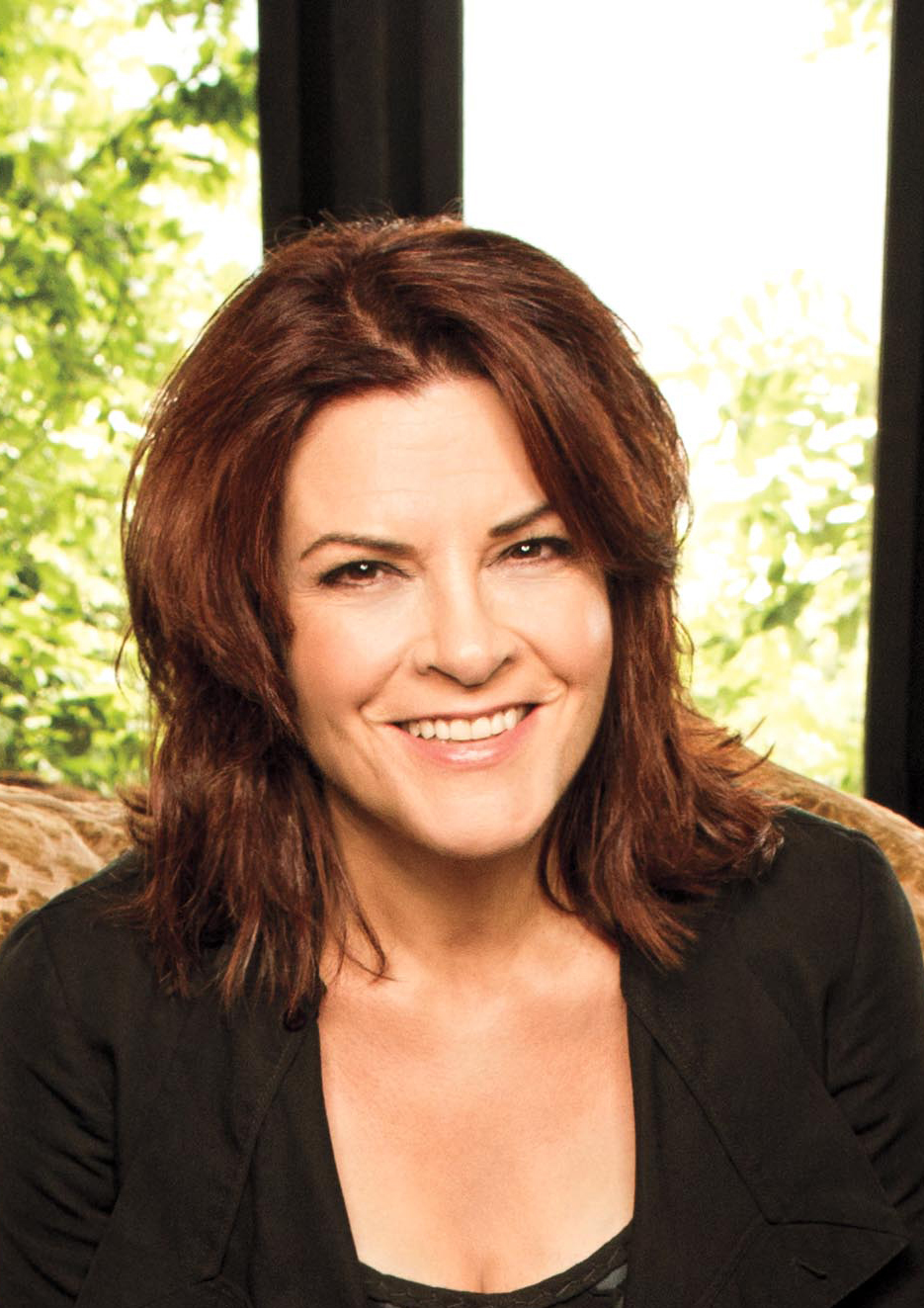
- Cash in 2012

Background information
- Born: May 24, 1955 (age 71); Memphis, Tennessee, U.S.
- Genres: Country; Americana; country pop; country folk
- Occupations: Singer; songwriter; author
- Instruments: Vocals; guitar
- Years active: 1978–present
- Labels: Ariola; Columbia; Capitol; Manhattan; Blue Note; House of Cash
- Spouses: Rodney Crowell (m. 1979; div. 1992) John Leventhal (m. 1995)
- Website: rosannecash.com

Signature
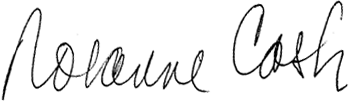

Rosanne Cash (born May 24, 1955) is an American singer-songwriter and author. She is the eldest daughter of country musician Johnny Cash and his first wife, Vivian Cash.

Although Cash is often classified as a country artist, her music draws from many genres, including folk, pop, rock, blues, and in particular, Americana. In the 1980s, she had a string of genre-crossing singles that entered both the country and pop charts, the most commercially successful being her 1981 breakthrough hit "Seven Year Ache". It topped the U.S. country singles chart, and reached the Top 30 on the U.S. pop chart.

In 1990, Cash released Interiors, a spare, introspective album that signaled a break from her pop-country past. The following year she ended her marriage to songwriter Rodney Crowell.

She moved from Nashville to New York City. She has continued to write, record, and perform, having since released six albums, written three books, and edited a collection of short stories. Her fiction and essays have been published in The New York Times, Rolling Stone, the Oxford American, New York Magazine, and other periodicals and collections.

Cash won a Grammy Award in 1985 for "I Don't Know Why You Don't Want Me" and has received 12 other Grammy nominations. She has had 11 No. 1 country hit singles, 21 Top 40 country singles, and two gold records. Cash was the 2014 recipient of Smithsonian magazine's American Ingenuity Award, in the Performing Arts category.

On February 8, 2015, Cash won three Grammy awards: for Best Americana Album for The River & the Thread; Best American Roots Song, with John Leventhal; and Best American Roots Performance for her album A Feather's Not a Bird. Cash was honored further in October that year, when she was inducted into the Nashville Songwriters Hall of Fame.

== Early life ==
Cash was born in 1955 in Memphis, Tennessee, to Vivian and Johnny Cash, when Johnny was recording his first tracks at Sun Records. She is the first of four daughters. Her mother was Vivian Cash (née Liberto), known to be of maternal Irish, German, and African-American ancestry, and paternal Sicilian. She grew up Catholic and her paternal Liberto grandparents were immigrants from Cefalù, Palermo.

The Cash couple married in San Antonio, Texas, where Vivian was born and raised. They later lived in Memphis, Tennessee. Vivian attracted attention as Johnny Cash became a star because some observers believed her to be black African, and interracial marriage was illegal in the South. She grew up in Sicilian-American culture in San Antonio, went to White schools in the segregated state, and was registered as White on her marriage license, among other documentation of her family's racial status as White.

With Johnny Cash's increasing success in country music, in 1958 he moved the family from Memphis to California, first to Los Angeles. He later bought a farm in Ventura. Her parents separated in 1962, and divorced six years later. Cash and her sisters were raised by their mother Vivian in the isolated, rural location.

After graduating from St. Bonaventure High School about 1973, Rosanne Cash joined her father's road show for two and a half years. She first worked as a wardrobe assistant, then as a background vocalist and occasional soloist. Rosanne Cash made her studio recording debut on Johnny Cash's 1974 album The Junkie and the Juicehead Minus Me, singing lead vocal on a version of Kris Kristofferson's "Broken Freedom Song".

In 1976, Johnny Cash recorded Rosanne's song "Love Has Lost Again" on his album One Piece At A Time. This was Rosanne Cash's first professionally recorded work as a songwriter.

That same year, she briefly worked for CBS Records in London before returning to Nashville to study English and drama at Vanderbilt University. She relocated to Los Angeles to study at the Lee Strasberg Theatre Institute in Hollywood. She recorded a demo in January 1978 with Emmylou Harris's songwriter/sideman Rodney Crowell, which led to a full album with German label Ariola Records.

== Music career ==
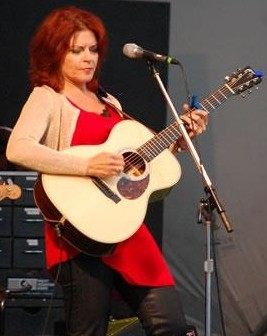
Cash at the Vancouver Folk Music Festival in 2011

=== 1978–1980: First American release ===
Cash recorded her self-titled debut album in 1978, but Ariola never released it in the United States. It has since become a collector's item. Mainly recorded and produced in Munich, Germany, with German-based musicians, it included three tracks recorded in Nashville and produced by Crowell. Though Cash was unhappy with the album, it attracted the attention of Columbia Records, which offered her a recording contract.

She began playing with Crowell's band The Cherry Bombs in California clubs. Crowell and Cash married in 1979.

That year Cash started work on her first Columbia LP. The album, Right or Wrong, was released in early 1980, and produced three Top 25 singles. The first, "No Memories Hangin' Around", a duet with country singer Bobby Bare, reached 17 on the Country Singles chart in 1979. It was followed by "Couldn't Do Nothing Right" and "Take Me, Take Me" in 1980. Although Cash was pregnant with her first child and unable to tour in support of the album, it was a critical success. Cash and Crowell moved to Nashville in 1981.

=== 1981–1989: Critical and commercial success ===
Cash's career picked up considerable momentum with the release of her second album, Seven Year Ache, in 1981. The album achieved critical raves and solid sales. The title track was a No. 1 hit on the Billboard Country Chart and crossed over to the Billboard Pop Chart, peaking at No. 22. The album yielded two additional No. 1 country hits, "My Baby Thinks He's a Train" and "Blue Moon with Heartache", and was certified Gold by the RIAA.

Cash's third album, Somewhere in the Stars (1982), was considered a disappointment after the commercial success of Seven Year Ache. But the album still reached the Top 100 of the U.S. pop album charts and included three U.S. country chart singles, "Ain't No Money", "I Wonder", and "It Hasn't Happened Yet". Cash struggled with substance abuse during this period of time; in 1984 she sought medical treatment.

After a three-year hiatus, Cash released her fourth studio album, Rhythm & Romance (1985). It yielded two No. 1 hits, "I Don't Know Why You Don't Want Me" and "Never Be You", and two other Country Top 10 singles, "Hold On" and "Second to No One". Rhythm & Romance drew high critical praise for its fusion of country and pop. "I Don't Know Why You Don't Want Me" won the 1985 Grammy Award for Best Female Country Vocal Performance; "Hold On" won the 1987 Robert J. Burton Award from BMI as the Most Performed Song of the Year.

In the 1980s, Cash curtailed her touring while raising a family with Crowell. (They had three daughters together, and she also reared Hannah, Crowell's daughter by his first marriage).

She continued to record and, in 1987, released the most critically acclaimed album of her career, King's Record Shop. It spawned four No. 1 hits, including a cover version of her father's "Tennessee Flat Top Box", John Hiatt's "The Way We Make a Broken Heart", "If You Change Your Mind", and John Stewart's "Runaway Train". It became Cash's second gold album.

In 1988 Cash recorded a duet with Crowell, "It's Such a Small World" (released on his Diamonds & Dirt album), which also went to No. 1 on the country charts. Cash was named Billboard's Top Singles Artist of the year.

In 1989, Columbia released her first compilation album, Hits 1979–1989. The album yielded two new hit singles, the Beatles cover "I Don't Want to Spoil the Party", which landed at No. 1 on the Billboard country charts, and "Black and White", which earned Cash her fifth Grammy nomination.

=== 1990–1995: Break up and relocation ===
In 1990, Cash released the critically acclaimed, deeply personal Interiors. Cash produced herself for the first time and wrote or co-wrote all the songs. "Her brutally dark take on intimate relationships was reflected throughout and made clear the marital problems that had been hinted at on earlier albums." "Highly autobiographical (though Cash has often insisted it is not quite as true to life as everyone assumes), Interiors was a brilliant, introspective album" and "her masterpiece". Other critics called it "maudlin" and "pessimistic". Interiors topped many best album lists in 1990 and received a Grammy award nomination for Best Contemporary Folk Album. It yielded one Top 40 single ("What We Really Want") and marked the beginning of sharp commercial decline for Cash.

Though it may have been inspired by the breakup of her marriage, it also signified her departure from Nashville and its country music establishment. In 1991 Cash relocated to New York City; in 1992, she and Crowell divorced. The Wheel, released in 1993, was "an unflinchingly confessional examination of the marriage's failure that ranked as her most musically diverse effort to date". The album was Cash's last for Columbia Records. It received considerable acclaim from critics, though neither of its two singles, "The Wheel" or "You Won't Let Me In", charted.

=== 1995–present: New York, new albums and books ===
Cash settled in lower Manhattan and in 1995 married producer/songwriter/guitarist John Leventhal, with whom she had co-produced The Wheel. She signed with Capitol Records and in 1996 released 10 Song Demo, a collection of stark home recordings with minimal accompaniment.

She also pursued a career as a writer and in 1996 Hyperion published the short story collection Bodies of Water to favorable reviews. In 1997, Cash was awarded an honorary doctorate from Memphis College of Art. She gave the commencement address that year. She has continued to speak publicly on writing and music.

In 1998, she and Leventhal began working on what would later become Rules of Travel. The recording sessions were cut short when she became pregnant. What was more difficult was that she was unable to sing for two and a half years, due to a polyp on her vocal cords.

Cash turned to focus on her writing. She published a children's book, Penelope Jane: A Fairy's Tale (2000), which included an exclusive CD and was published by HarperCollins. The following year she edited a collection of short fiction by songwriters titled Songs Without Rhyme: Prose by Celebrated Songwriters (2001).

Recovering her voice, she resumed recording and in 2003 released Rules of Travel, her first full-fledged studio album for Capitol. The album had guest appearances by Sheryl Crow and Steve Earle, a song co-written by Joe Henry and Jakob Dylan, and the poignant "September When It Comes," a duet with her father Johnny Cash. Rules of Travel was nominated for a 2003 Grammy Award for Best Contemporary Folk Album.

Cash was also an inaugural member of the Independent Music Awards' judging panel to support independent artists.

In 2005, Legacy Recordings reissued her Seven Year Ache (1981), King's Record Shop (1987), and Interiors (1990). It also released a new collection spanning 1979–2003, The Very Best of Rosanne Cash.

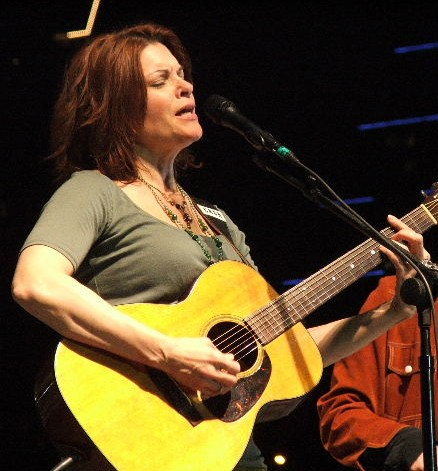
Cash at the 2006 South by Southwest Festival

In 2006, Cash released Black Cadillac, an album marking the losses of both her stepmother June, and father Johnny, who both died in 2003. Her mother, Vivian Cash Distin, died in 2005 as Rosanne finished the album. The album was critically praised, and named to the Top 10 lists of The New York Times, Billboard, PopMatters, NPR and other general interest and music publications. The album was nominated for a 2006 Grammy Award for Best Contemporary Folk/Americana Album.

Cash toured extensively in support of the album. She created a multimedia performance, with video, imagery and narration drawn from the songs and from her family history. In 2006, a short documentary by filmmaker Steve Lippman, "Mariners and Musicians", based on the album and interviews with Cash, premiered at the Tribeca Film Festival and was screened at festivals worldwide.

Cash's music was also featured prominently in an American Masters biography of photographer Annie Leibovitz. She had photographed Cash and her family numerous times.

In late 2007, Cash underwent brain surgery for a rare condition (Chiari I malformation) and was forced to cancel her remaining concert dates. After a successful recovery, she resumed writing and live appearances. In 2008 she wrote for Measure for Measure, the songwriters' column in The New York Times; recorded with Kris Kristofferson and Elvis Costello, and appeared on Costello's TV series Spectacle.

Cash released her next studio album, titled The List, on October 6, 2009. The album is based on a list of 100 greatest country and American songs that Johnny Cash gave her when she was 18. Cash picked 12 songs out of the 100 for the album. The album features vocal duets with Bruce Springsteen, Elvis Costello, Jeff Tweedy, and Rufus Wainwright. An iTunes Store-only 13th song features a duet with Neko Case. On September 9, 2010, the Americana Music Association named The List the Album of the Year.

In addition to her own recordings, Cash has made guest appearances on albums by Jeff Bridges, Rodney Crowell, Guy Clark, Vince Gill, Lyle Lovett, Mary Chapin Carpenter, Marc Cohn, The Chieftains, John Stewart, Willy Mason, Mike Doughty, Black 47 and others, as well as children's albums by Larry Kirwan, Tom Chapin, and Dan Zanes and Friends. She has also appeared on tribute albums to The Band, Johnny Cash, Bob Dylan, Woody Guthrie, Jimi Hendrix, John Hiatt, Kris Kristofferson, Laura Nyro, Yoko Ono, Doc Pomus, and Tammy Wynette.

Cash wrote Composed: A Memoir (2010), "a pointillistic memoir about growing up with and without her father, and about how she slid out from under his shadow to become a gifted artist in her own right." It became a New York Times bestseller.

In November 2011, Cash performed with the Minnesota Orchestra. In preparation for the event, she worked with composer Stephen Barber to orchestrate nine of her songs.

The tourism organization Brand USA enlisted Cash to develop a song to promote foreign tourism to the United States. In April 2012, she released the song "Land of Dreams"; it was used by Brand USA in video advertisements and online as part of a global tourism campaign.

On February 6, 2012, Cash received the AFTRA Media and Entertainment Excellence Award in Sound Recordings.

Cash sang the part of Monique on the 2013 album Ghost Brothers of Darkland County, a collaboration between rock singer John Mellencamp and novelist Stephen King.

Cash gave the closing speech at the Association of Performing Arts Presenters' conference, APAP|NYC, in January 2013.

Cash signed with Blue Note Records in 2013 to release a new original album. The River & the Thread was released on January 14, 2014. It was Cash's first album in more than four years.

The River & the Thread is a collection of songs written with husband and collaborator John Leventhal, inspired by trips through the American South. Cash describes The River & The Thread as "a mini-travelogue of the South, and of the soul." The journey included visits to father Johnny Cash's childhood home in Dyess, Arkansas; her own early childhood home in Memphis, Tennessee; William Faulkner's house; Dockery Plantation in Cleveland, Mississippi; the plantation where Howlin' Wolf and Charley Patton worked and sang; Natchez, Mississippi; the blues trail; and the Tallahatchie Bridge. They visited Natalie Chanin, a master seamstress in Florence, Alabama.

Throughout 2014, Cash toured extensively with partner John Leventhal, performing The River & The Thread together with first-person stories woven through historical time, to much critical acclaim. The River & The Thread was the Number One album of 2014 on Americana radio, and was honored by USA Today, The New York Times, The Village Voice, Rolling Stone, The Huffington Post, NPR Fresh Air, Uncut (magazine), No Depression, The Sun (UK), and American Songwriter as one of the top albums of 2014.

On February 8, 2015, Cash won three Grammy awards for Best Americana Album for The River & The Thread; Best American Roots Song, with John Leventhal; and Best American Roots Performance for "A Feather's Not A Bird".

In 2015, Cash was inducted into the Nashville Songwriters Hall of Fame, honored as Artist-in-Residence at the Country Music Hall of Fame and Museum, and selected as Carnegie Hall's 2015-2016 Perspective Series Artist.

In 2018, Cash signed with ICM Partners and released a new album entitled She Remembers Everything.

On February 29, 2020, Cash, with her band, performed at the historic Universal Preservation Hall in Saratoga Springs, New York. It had been restored and upgraded to a state-of-the-art performing arts venue.

== Personal life ==
=== Family ===
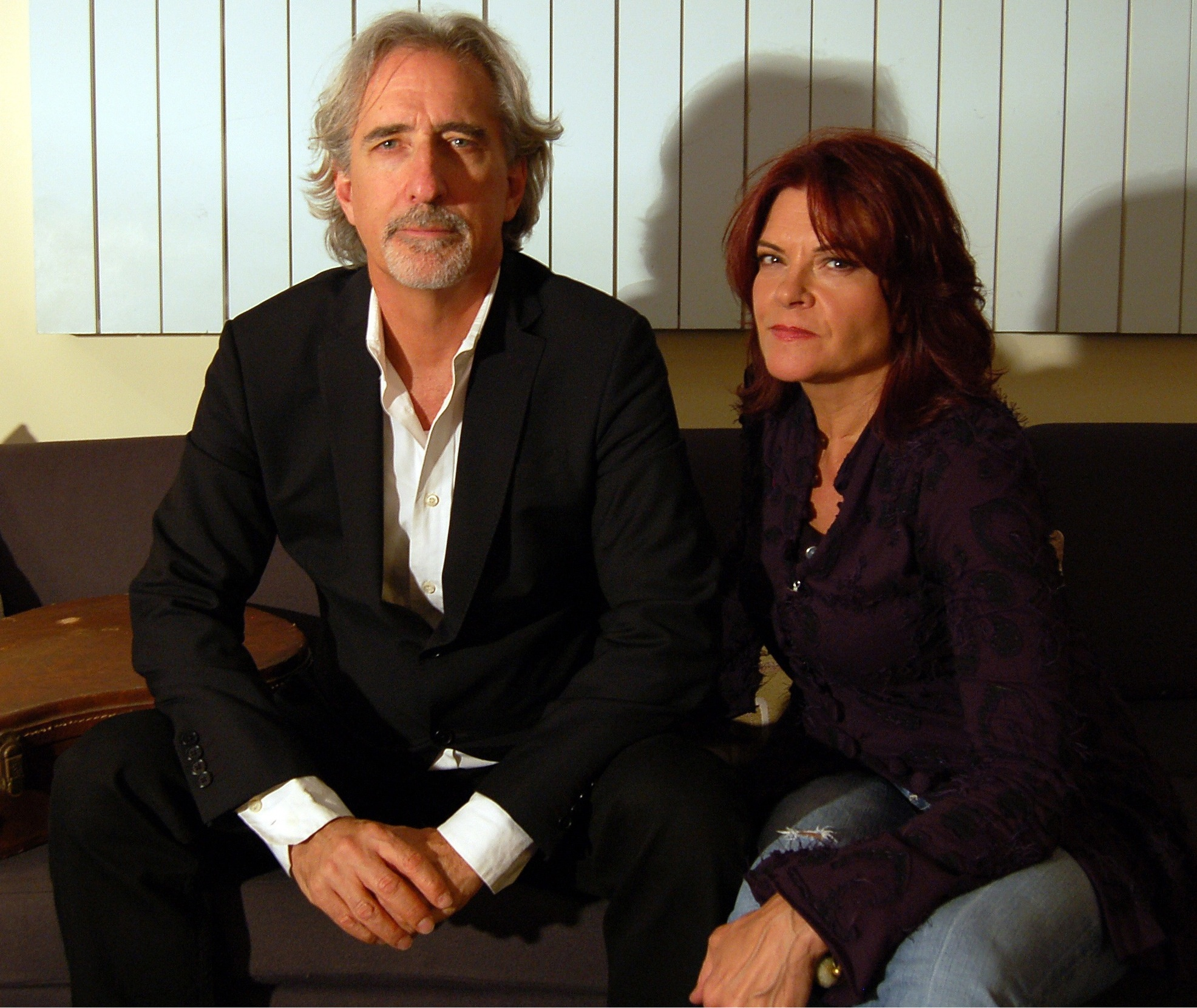
Cash and second husband John Leventhal in 2013

Cash has three younger sisters: Kathy, Cindy, and Tara. Her parents divorced in 1966.

Her father married June Carter in 1968, who had two daughters. The couple had a son together, John Carter Cash, Rosanne's half-brother.

Cash's stepsisters both became country singers:

- Carlene Carter (from June's marriage to singer Carl Smith) and
- Rosie Nix Adams, aka Rosie Carter (from June's marriage to Edwin "Rip" Nix).

Cash's stepmother and father died in 2003, and her mother in 2005.

Cash married country music singer-songwriter Rodney Crowell in 1979. They have three daughters: Caitlin Rivers, Chelsea Jane, and Carrie Kathleen. Cash also raised Crowell's daughter from a previous marriage, Hannah. Cash and Crowell divorced in 1992.

She married her second husband, John Leventhal, in 1995, and they have one son, Jakob. Cash lives with her husband and son in the Chelsea section of Manhattan.

In February 2021, Cash appeared as a guest on Finding Your Roots, the PBS TV series hosted by historian Henry Louis Gates Jr. Among what was learned about her ancestors, genealogists discovered that one of Cash's 16 maternal great-great-great-grandmothers, Sarah A. Shields, was a mixed-race woman born into slavery in South Carolina, who later lived with her parents and siblings in Alabama. The researchers were unable to learn the name of her enslaved African-American mother. Sarah and her eight mixed-race siblings were all freed in 1848 by their white father, Irish-American planter William Shields, who gained the required act of the Alabama state legislature to achieve this. Sarah, her siblings and their descendants all married white as did their descendants. Many of the extended family moved to Texas, to Mexico during the Civil War, and then back to Texas. In 1870 in Texas, Lafayette Robinson, one of Cash's direct maternal ancestors, was classified as 'mulatto' on the census. With continued intermarriage with whites, descendants were accepted as white. They were classified as white in Texas in death certificates of the 1930s and the 1930 census. Along with studying documents, other researchers analyzed Cash's DNA. They found she had 3.3% sub-Saharan African markers, and African ancestry on her father's side, as well as on her mother's. This was likely from the same period of slave society in the South. Gates found that Cash and actress Angela Bassett are distant relatives through shared DNA from a common African-American ancestor. She later joined the Daughters of the American Revolution.

=== Health ===
On November 27, 2007, Cash was admitted to New York's Presbyterian Hospital for brain surgery. In a press statement, she announced that she suffered from Chiari malformation type I and expected to "make a full recovery". The surgery was successful, though recovery was slow, and in March 2008 she was forced to cancel her spring tour dates for further recuperation. She wrote about the experience in her New York Times article "Well, Actually, It Is Brain Surgery". She resumed writing, recording and performing in late summer of 2008.

== Other projects ==
Cash supports several charitable organizations. She is a longtime board member of The Center To Prevent Youth Violence (CPYV), formally known as PAX, an organization dedicated to preventing gun violence among children. She was honored by PAX at its fifth-annual benefit gala in 2005.

Cash is a frequent guest teacher at the English and songwriting programs of various colleges and universities including LeMoyne, Fairleigh-Dickinson, and NYU.

Cash has been associated with Children Incorporated for more than 25 years and has sponsored many children through the organization, which works to support and educate needy children and young adults worldwide.

Cash was elected to the Century Association in 2009.

She also works with Arkansas State University on the Johnny Cash Boyhood Home Project, which has restored her father's childhood home in Dyess, Arkansas. The Cash family has supported the restoration by raising money through annual music festivals. Rosanne hosted the first- and second-annual Johnny Cash Music Festivals in 2011 and 2012. She resumed rotating host duties with her half-brother John Carter when the festival resumed at Dyess in 2017.

In 2014 Cash contributed essays to the Oxford-American and the book of collected essays edited by Sari Botton Never Can Say Goodbye: Writers On Their Unshakable Love For New York. She was also featured in Gael Towey's Portraits in Creativity as a featured artist for her Profile Series.

Cash is a dedicated supporter of artists' rights in the digital age and sits on the board of the Content Creators Coalition. On June 25, 2014, Cash testified before The House of Representatives, Judiciary Committee on intellectual property rights and Internet music licensing.

In 2018, Cash was a recipient of an honorary doctorate degree from Berklee College of Music.

== Discography ==
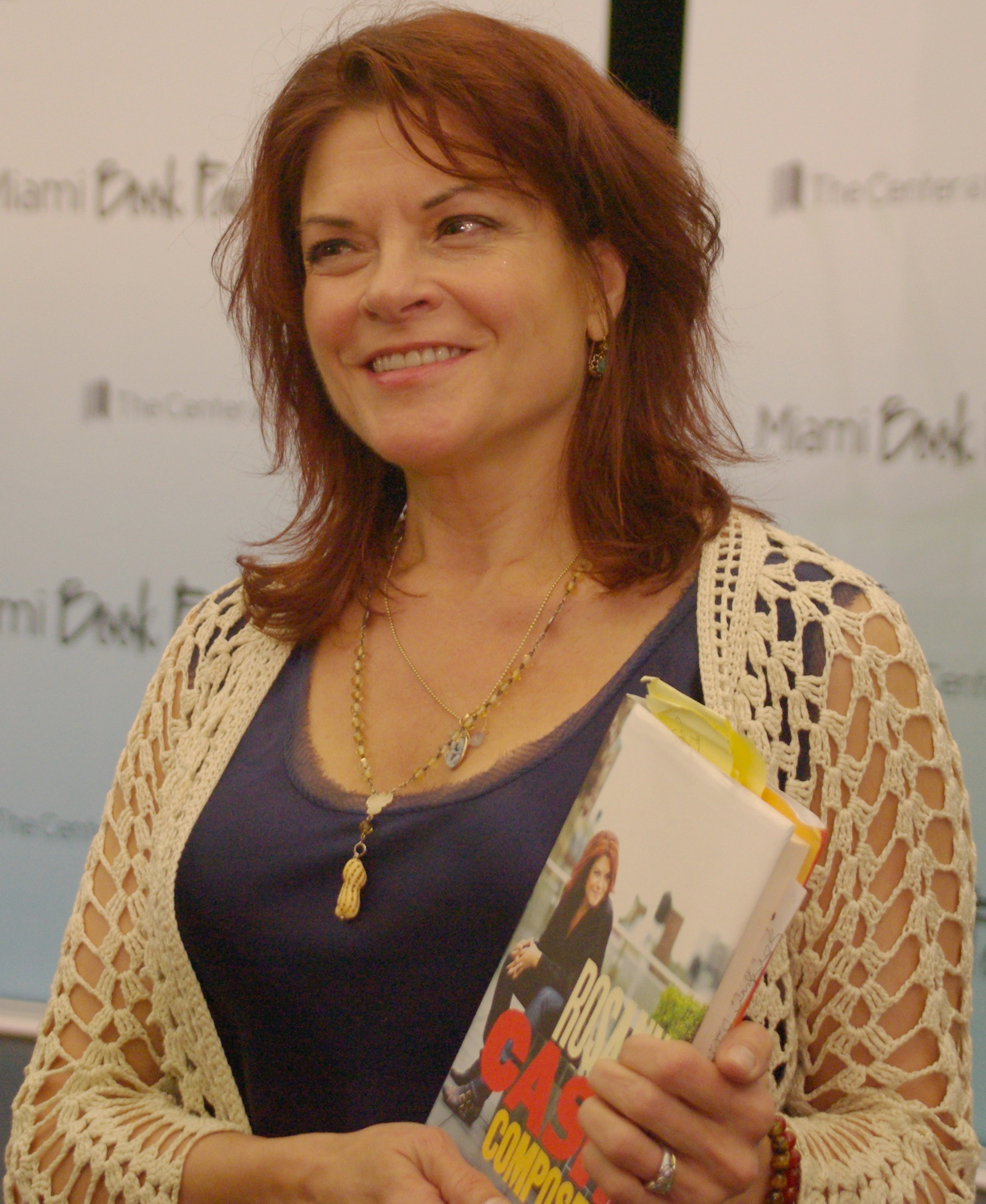
Cash during the presentation of her book at the Miami Book Fair International 2011

Studio albums

- Rosanne Cash (1978)
- Right or Wrong (1980)
- Seven Year Ache (1981)
- Somewhere in the Stars (1982)
- Rhythm & Romance (1985)
- King's Record Shop (1987)
- Interiors (1990)
- The Wheel (1993)
- 10 Song Demo (1996)
- Rules of Travel (2003)
- Black Cadillac (2006)
- The List (2009)
- The River & the Thread (2014)
- She Remembers Everything (2018)

== Books and articles ==
- Cash, Rosanne (1997). Bodies of Water. Harper Perennial. ISBN 978-0380729449.
- Cash, Rosanne (2006). Penelope Jane: A Fairy's Tale. HarperCollins. ISBN 978-0060842307.
- Cash, Rosanne (2001). Songs Without Rhyme: Prose By Celebrated Songwriters. Hyperion. ISBN 978-0786862771.
- Cash, Rosanne (2010). Composed: A Memoir. Viking Press/Penguin Group. ISBN 978-1-101-45769-6.

Cash's work has also appeared in The New York Times, The Oxford American, New York Magazine, Newsweek, Rolling Stone, and Martha Stewart Living.

== Awards and honors ==
Academy of Country Music Awards

Year	Category	Nominated work	Result
1981	Single of the Year	"Seven Year Ache"	Nominated
1981	Album of the Year	Seven Year Ache	Nominated
1982	Top Female Vocalist	Herself	Nominated
1985	Top Female Vocalist	Herself	Nominated
1987	Top Female Vocalist	Herself	Nominated
1988	Top Female Vocalist	Herself	Nominated
1988	Top Vocal Duet	Rosanne Cash and Rodney Crowell	Nominated

Americana Music Honors & Awards

Year	Category	Nominated work	Result
2006	Artist of the Year	Herself	Nominated
2006	Song of the Year	"Black Cadillac"	Nominated
2010	Album of the Year	The List	Won
2014	Album of the Year	The River and the Thread	Nominated
2014	Artist of the Year	Herself	Nominated
2014	Song of the Year	"A Feather's Not A Bird"	Nominated
2018	Spirit of Americana/Free Speech Award	Herself	Won
2019	Song of the Year	"By Degrees"	Nominated

Country Music Association Awards

Year	Category	Nominated work	Result
1981	Horizon Award	Herself	Nominated
1982	Horizon Award	Herself	Nominated
1982	Female Vocalist of the Year	Herself	Nominated
1985	Female Vocalist of the Year	Herself	Nominated
1986	Female Vocalist of the Year	Herself	Nominated
1987	Female Vocalist of the Year	Herself	Nominated
1988	Female Vocalist of the Year	Herself	Nominated
1988	Vocal Event of the Year	"It's Such a Small World"	Nominated
1988	Single of the Year	"Tennessee Flat Top Box"	Nominated
1989	Female Vocalist of the Year	Herself	Nominated
1989	Vocal Event of the Year	"Ballad of a Teenage Queen"	Nominated

Grammy Awards
To date, Cash has been nominated for 15 Grammy Awards across four genre categories: Country, Folk, Pop and American Roots.

Year	Category	Nominated work	Result
1981	Best Female Country Vocal Performance	"Seven Year Ache"	Nominated
1982	Best Female Country Vocal Performance	"Ain't No Money"	Nominated
1985	Best Female Country Vocal Performance	"I Don't Know Why You Don't Want Me"	Won
1985	Best Country Song	"I Don't Know Why You Don't Want Me"	Nominated
1987	Best Female Country Vocal Performance	"King's Record Shop"	Nominated
1988	Best Country Collaboration with Vocals	"It's Such a Small World" (with Rodney Crowell)	Nominated
1989	Best Female Country Vocal Performance	"I Don't Want to Spoil the Party"	Nominated
1991	Best Contemporary Folk Album	Interiors	Nominated
2003	Best Contemporary Folk Album	Rules of Travel	Nominated
2006	Best Contemporary Folk Album	Black Cadillac	Nominated
2009	Best Pop Collaboration with Vocals	"Sea of Heartbreak" (with Bruce Springsteen)	Nominated
2010	Best Americana Album	The List	Nominated
2014	Best Americana Album	The River and the Thread	Won
2014	Best American Roots Performance	"A Feather's Not A Bird"	Won
2014	Best American Roots Song	"A Feather's Not A Bird"	Won
2020	Best American Roots Song	"Crossing to Jerusalem"	Nominated

Other honors

In 2021, Cash was awarded The Edward MacDowell Medal by The MacDowell Colony for outstanding contributions to American culture.

On May 7, 2022, Cash was awarded an honorary doctorate degree in Humane Letters by Arkansas State University. She was the keynote speaker during commencement.

In 2026, Cash's album The Wheel was selected by the Library of Congress for preservation in the National Recording Registry for its "cultural, historical or aesthetic importance in the nation's recorded sound heritage".
