= Jack Lathrop =

American jazz vocalist and guitarist (1913–1987)

- Lathrop in 1941

Background information
- Born: John Marcus Lathrop; May 11, 1913; Sherburne, New York, U.S.
- Died: January 9, 1987 (aged 73) Stonington, Connecticut, U.S.
- Genre: Jazz
- Occupation: Musician
- Instruments: Vocals; guitar
- Years active: 1930s–1950s
- Formerly of: The Glenn Miller Orchestra

John Marcus Lathrop (May 11, 1913 – January 9, 1987) was an American vocalist and guitarist with the Tune Twisters, Glenn Miller, and Hal McIntyre. Beginning around 1947, Lathrop was leader of the Drug Store Cowboys.

== Early life ==
Lathrop was born in Sherburne, New York. His parents, Margaret Lathrop (née Margaret Lowell; 1893–1958) and John Marcos Lathrop (1891–1974) were married May 28, 1912, in Manhattan. According to the 1920 US Census, his mother was divorced; and in 1920, he, his sister Kathryn (1914–1962), and his mother lived with his widowed maternal grandmother, Kittie Isabel Lowell (née Kittie Isabel Purdy; 1863–1938), who owned and ran a private boarding house in White Plains, New York.

== Career ==
=== Guitarist and vocalist in combos and big bands ===
Tune Twisters
In the mid 1930s, Lathrop was one of founding members of the Tune Twisters, a swing jazz vocal trio originally composed of Andy Love (1911–1982), Robert Wacker (1909–1985), and himself. The Tune Twisters were featured on radio broadcasts and also recorded and performed with jazz artists that included Ray Noble in 1935 (with Noble, the Tune Twisters were initially known as "The Freshmen"), Bob Crosby in 1935, Glenn Miller in 1937, and Adrian Rollini in 1938. Lathrop performed with the Tune Twisters in the 1937 Broadway production, Between the Devil. They sang the song "Triplets." The production ran from December 22, 1937, to March 12, 1938 (93 performances). During the audition, the Tune Twisters were known as the Savoy Club Boys. Lathrop was a member of the Tune Twisters in 1938 when they recorded the first radio jingle of its kind for Pepsi – "Pepsi-Cola Hits the Spot" (aka "Nickel, Nickel"). Lathrop was replaced around 1940 by Gene Lanham (né Eugene Prentiss Lanham; 1915–1977). The trio also performed in two 1935 films, Sweet Surrender and Melody Magic, directed by Fred Waller.

Big bands
Lathrop co-wrote the song "It's Anybody's Moon" with Jimmy Dorsey and Eddie DeLange in 1939. Dorsey and His Orchestra, with Bob Eberly as vocalist, recorded it February 21, 1939, in New York and Decca released it as a 78 rpm B side single (matrix 65052-A; catalog # 2322).

Glenn Miller
Lathrop was guitarist and vocalist with Glenn Miller from 1940 to 1942. While a member, Lathrop composed "Helpless", featuring vocals by Ray Eberle, and "Long Time No See, Baby", featuring vocals by Marion Hutton, which were released as 78 rpm singles on RCA.

=== Solo artist ===
Jack Lathrop With The Drugstore Cowboys
Lathrop's first release with RCA Victor, the 78 single 20-3109, his first charting hit as a solo artist, was "Hair of Gold" released in 1948. This song was written by Sunny Skylar and first recorded by vocalist Jack Emerson (né Abraham Jacob Melamerson; 1920–2014) on Metrotone Records, (Note: Metrotone Records, aka Metrotone Record Co., Brooklyn, was a short-lived label founded in 1945 by Carl LeBow (1914–1980). LeBow later served in various roles at (i) Mode Records (de); (ii) Apollo Records (sales manager) (1950); (iii) King Records (A&R chief) (1953); Bethlehem Records (general manager) (1957). LeBow, with Ted Steele, left Bethlehem in 1958 to form Aamco Records, a budget label, where LeBow served as President. In 1962, Gerald Hille (1926–1962) founded Gerald Records, Inc., which owned two labels, Alfa and Toto Records. Hille was killed August 30, 1962, in an automobile accident when he fell asleep while driving. A week later, LeBow was named General Manager.) and became the label's best seller. Gordon MacRae's version was the biggest hit, but Lathrop’s version also fared well. It was his highest-charting song, reaching a peak of No. 19. The b-side of this record was "You Call Everybody Darlin'", a words and music written by Sam Martin, Ben L. Trace, Clem Watts (pseudonym of Al Trace), and Albert J. Trace. This song also reached the charts at No. 27. These sides had been recorded as a response to the James Petrillo-led Musician’s Union recording ban of 1948. The instrumentation backing the harmonizing vocalists was limited to harmonicas, jug-blowers, and ukuleles. Despite the limited instrumentation (or perhaps because of it) Billboard reviewed both sides as "excellent."

Jack Lathrop and His Orchestra
The second RCA release (catalog 20-3199) was “Dainty Brenda Lee,” which received a rating of "excellent" from Billboard. "Corn Belt Symphony" was placed on the other side of the 78 rpm disc. This song was cited as both an "Operators Pick" (peaking at No. 2) and “Retailers Pick” (peak No. 6) for several weeks in late 1948 in Billboard, but despite the reviews and large marketing support from RCA, the disc had limited commercial impact.

Eve Young and Jack Lathrop
His next release for RCA was "My Darling, My Darling", a duet with Eve Young. The song was from the 1948 Broadway musical, Where's Charley?. Lathrop and Young's version garnered negative reviews from Billboard and the New York Times, but it reached the Juke Box charts at No. 26. Yet, in 1949, Billboard ranked it No. 5 in its "Honor Roll of Hits" for the week ending January 21, 1949.

Jack Lathrop with the Drugstore Cowboys and Orchestra
The success of the RCA recordings prompted Jack to hire Frank Hanshaw as a manager, and to go on tour with a trio consisting guitar, accordion, and bass. He recorded two more sides (RCA Victor 20-3327) before touring, "Don't Hang Around" and "One Has My Name," which were reviewed as "good" by Billboard.

Children's series
In addition to the popular material, RCA utilized his talent for a new series of children's records.

== Discography ==
As of 2019, The Jazz Discography (online), a database of jazz sessionography and discography, which includes transcriptions of radio broadcasts, lists 135 recordings of Lathrop, as guitarist and vocalist with Glenn Miller and Hal McIntyre, between April 28, 1940, and July 22, 1942. The database neither includes Lathrop's recordings with the Tune Twisters (in the mid to late 1930s) nor his recordings with the Drugstore Cowboys (late 1940s).

== Compositions ==
- "It's Anybodys Moon"

Eddie DeLange (w&m)
Jimmy Dorsey (w&m)
Jack Lathrop (w&m)
1939

- "Helpless"

Jack Lathrop (w&m)
Mutual Music Society
11 October 1940; EU233962

- "Long Time No See Baby"

Jack Lathrop (w&m)
Sunny Skylar (aka Sonny Skylar) (w&m)
Mutual Music Society
11 October 1940; EU233963
OCLC 221026622, 39970427

- "I Like to Have You Like to Have Me Love You"

Jack Lathrop (w&m)
Mutual Music Society
9 October 1946; EU50685
24 January 1947; EP11657

- "You Are My Love"

Jack Lathrop (words)
Charlie Ryan (words)
Ben Weisman (music)
Broadcast Music, Inc.
31 March 1947; EP15226

- "I Wouldn't Be Surprised"

Jack Lathrop (w&m)
Dale Wood (William Lawrence Hansen); pseudonym of Bill Hansen (aka William Robert Hansen; 1905–1968) (w&m)
Cecille Music Company
17 March 1948; EU121366
OCLC 497787715

- "Smile"

Jack Lathrop (w&m)
Dale Wood (pseudonym of Bill Hansen) (w&m)
Cecille Music Company
28 March 1948; EP27851
OCLC 498933149

== Movie appearance ==
Lathrop appeared in the 1941 20th Century Fox musical film Sun Valley Serenade as a guitarist as a member of the Glenn Miller Orchestra.

== Personal life and death ==
On November 10, 1940, he married Barbara Jane Mitchell (1919–2000) in Manhattan. Barbara's father, Joseph James Mitchell (1873–1940) had died in White Plains two months earlier. Jack and Barbara Lathrop had three sons (John III, James, and Jeffrey) and a daughter (Betty Jo).

He died in Stonington, Connecticut, in 1987, aged 73.
