= Anita Florence Hemmings =

First black student to attend Vassar College

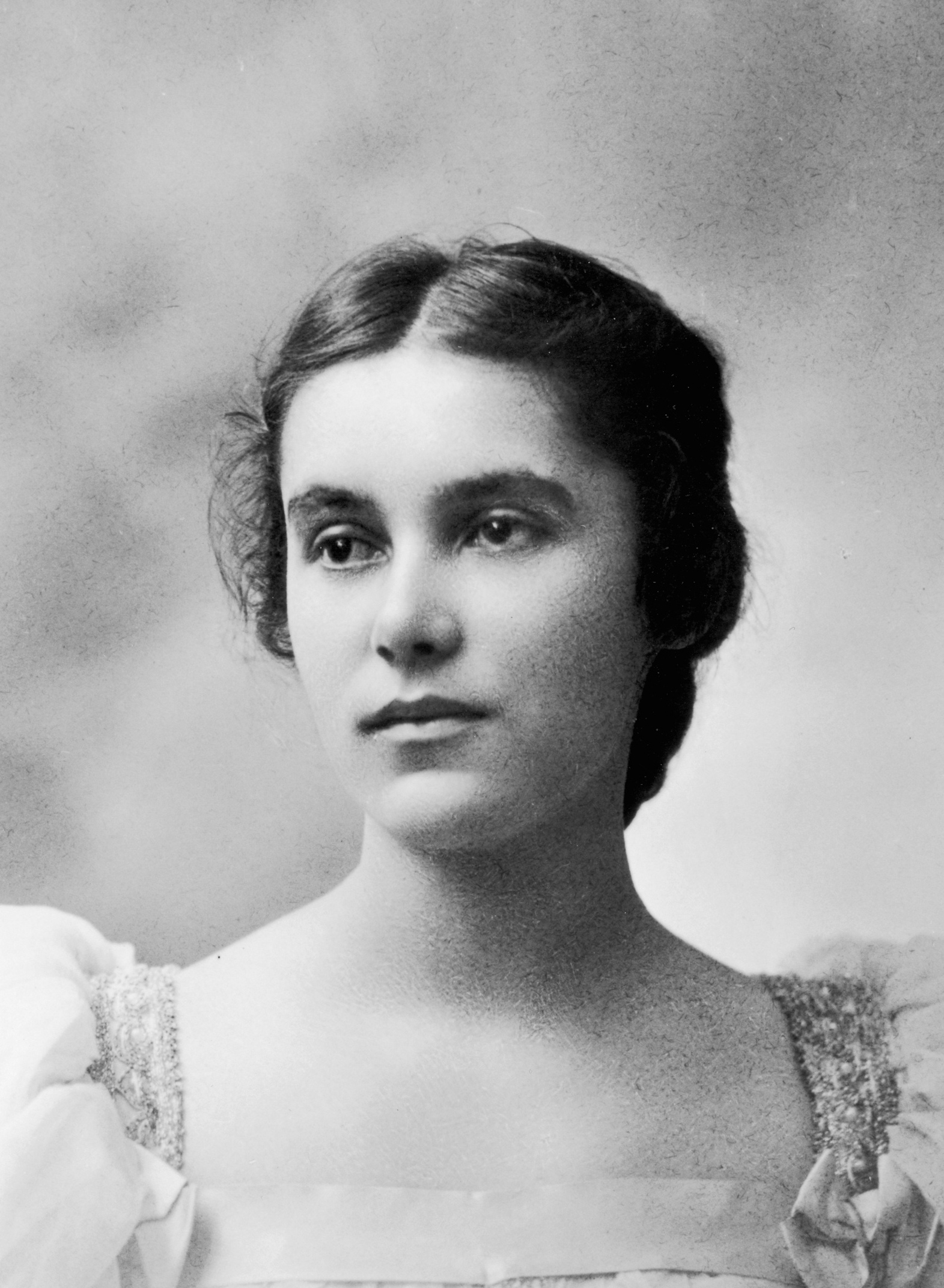
- Born: June 8, 1872; Boston, Massachusetts, U.S.
- Died: October 25, 1960 (aged 88); New York City, U.S.
- Education: Vassar College
- Occupation: Librarian
- Spouse: Andrew Love (m. 1903)
- Children: 3

Anita Florence Hemmings (June 8, 1872 – October 15, 1960) was the first African American woman to graduate from Vassar College. With both European and African ancestry, she passed as white for socioeconomic benefits. After graduation, Hemmings became a librarian at the Boston Public Library.

== Personal life ==
Anita Hemmings was born June 8, 1872, in Boston. Her parents were Dora Logan (maiden name, 1856–1941) and Robert Williamson Hemmings, Sr. (1843–1908). Robert's mother Sarah "Sallie" Hemings (1808–1868) was born in slavery at Monticello, and was the great-niece of the well known Sarah "Sally" Hemings (1773–1835) and of Martha Wayles Skelton Jefferson (1748–1782). Anita was raised as an Episcopalian.

=== Siblings ===
1. Frederick John Hemmings (né Frederic Henderson Hemmings; 1873–1956), earned a bachelor's degree in chemistry from MIT in 1897.
2. Elizabeth "Libby" N. Hemings (born 1876), married Walter Gilbert Alexander, MD (1880–1953), on May 3, 1904, in Boston. They later divorced.
3. Robert Williamson Hemmings, Jr. (born 1882), studied art and in 1903 won a bronze medal and scholarship from the Eric Pape School of Art for a black-and-white sketch. He had graduated June 26, 1899, from the Sherwin School, a high school for African Americans in Roxbury.

=== Husband ===
Anita married Andrew Jackson Love (1861–1948), on October 20, 1903, at Trinity Church in Boston. Their marriage license indicates their race as African American.

In 1890, Love earned a medical degree from the Meharry Medical Department of Central Tennessee College in Nashville, a historically black college distinguished for having the first medical school in the South for African Americans. In the summer of 1905, he did post-graduate studies at Harvard Medical School.

Like some other black Americans of mixed ancestry, both Hemmings and her husband passed as white as adults for socioeconomic benefit. They did not inform their children of their biracial ancestry.

=== Children ===
1. Ellen Parker Love (1905–1995), a 1927 graduate of Vassar. On June 6, 1934, in Manhattan, she married Charles Beckinton Atkin (1906–1987).
2. Barbara Hope Love (1907–2007). On June 9, 1930, in Manhattan, she married William Adair Hurt (1907–1965). They later divorced.
3. Andrew Jackson Love, Jr. (1911–1982), jazz musician. He attended the Horace Mann School until around 1927, then transferred to the Mount Herman School in Northfield, Massachusetts, graduating around 1930. He studied pre-med at the University of Wisconsin for two years (1930 and 1931), then devoted himself to music and became an acclaimed jazz vocalist. He was a founder of the jazz trio, the Tune Twisters. Around 1939, the trio recorded a nationally popular jingle for Pepsi; this was an innovation in broadcast advertising considered one of the first of its kind.

== Secondary and higher education ==
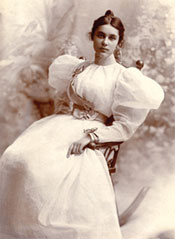
Hemmings in 1887

Hemmings attended preparation school at Girls' High School in Boston and Northfield, where she had been roommates with Elizabeth Baker (maiden; 1868–1943), who, on September 23, 1896, married William Henry Lewis (1868–1949).

Fulfilling a childhood dream, Hemmings attended Vassar, and earned a Bachelor of Arts degree in 1897. Based on her appearance and visible European ancestry, she was apparently assumed to be white. About the time she graduated, a Boston newspaper reported that Fred J. Hemmings, an African American, had graduated from MIT, and he had a sister at Vassar. Her story came out.

Later, rumors circulated that she should have been valedictorian, but they were false. Some said that Hemmings was the most attractive woman in her class. Classmates believed that she may have had 'Indian blood', as she was darker skinned than some girls and had straight black hair. She sang soprano in the glee club and was the featured soloist at the local churches in Poughkeepsie.

In 1997, Vassar African-American studies students petitioned college president Frances D. Fergusson to recognize Hemmings at that year's centennial celebration. Writing about it in Vassar Quarterly, Olivia Mancini, a local journalist, said this recognition "brought [Hemmings'] graduation and presence to a level of honor that it should have had a hundred years ago." Vassar has acknowledged Anita Hemmings as the first African American to graduate the college, and noted that for almost all of her college career, she was thought to be white.

== In popular culture ==
In November 2017, it was announced that Zendaya will produce and star in a biopic of Hemmings' life titled A White Lie, based on the 2016 novel The Gilded Years by Karin Tanabe. This explores Hemmings' life in a fictional way. Reese Witherspoon will also produce the project and Monica Beletsky will write the script. TriStar Pictures will distribute the film.

== See also ==
Biographies of other multi-racial people

- Mary Mildred Williams
- Anatole Broyard
- Alvera Frederic

Film

- Multi-Facial, 1995 film
- Passing, 2021 film

Filmmakers

- Lacey Schwartz Delgado

Literature

- Passing, 1929 novel
- The Autobiography of an Ex-Colored Man, 1912 fictional novel

Terminology

- Tragic mulatto
- Multiracial
- Melungeon
