= Seven Brides for Seven Brothers =

1954 film by Stanley Donen

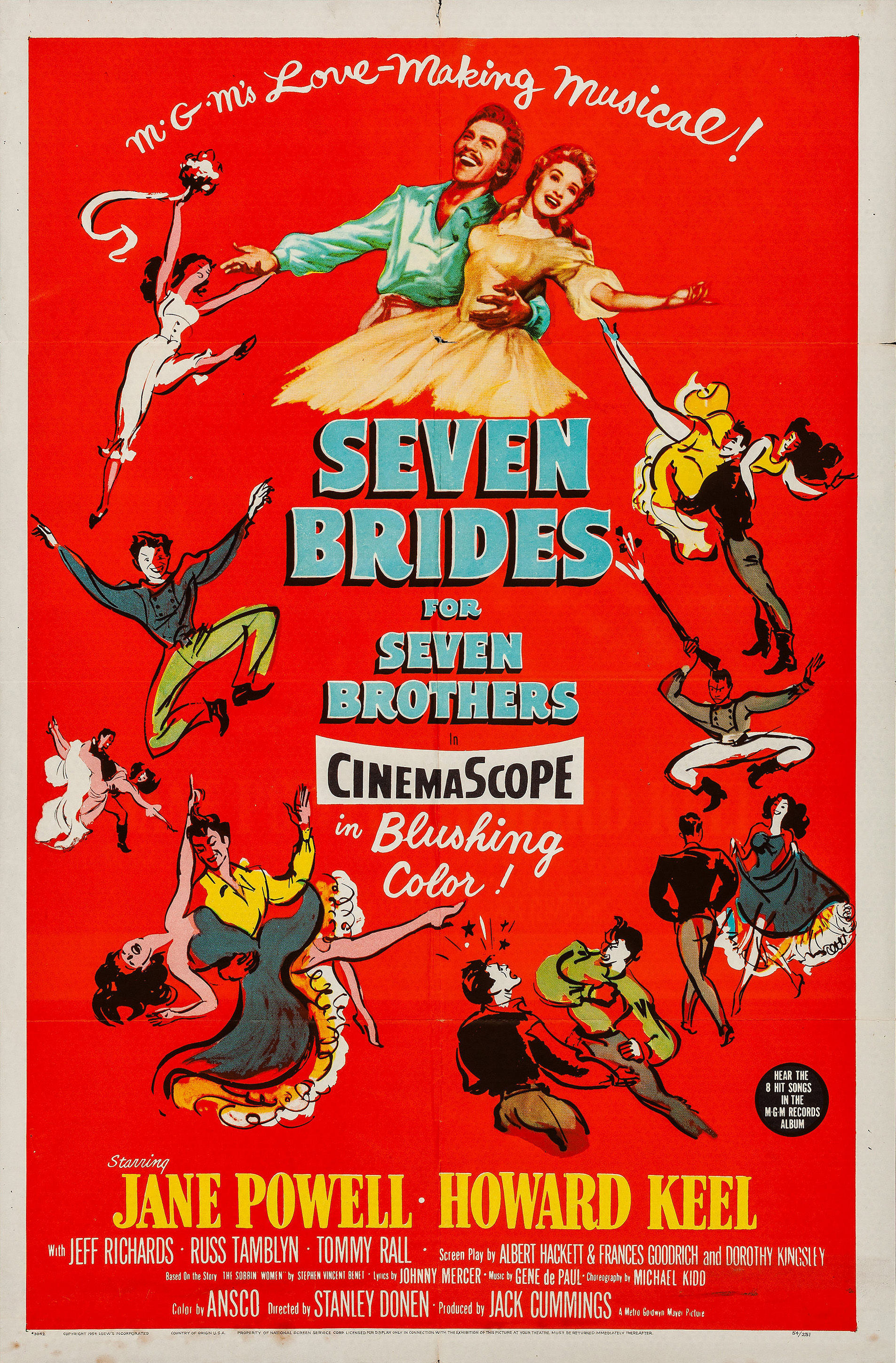
- Theatrical release poster
- Directed by: Stanley Donen
- Screenplay by: Albert Hackett; Frances Goodrich; Dorothy Kingsley
- Based on: "The Sobbin' Women"; 1938 story in Argosy by Stephen Vincent Benét
- Produced by: Jack Cummings
- Starring: Jane Powell; Howard Keel; Jeff Richards; Julie Newmar; Russ Tamblyn; Tommy Rall
- Cinematography: George Folsey
- Edited by: Ralph E. Winters
- Music by: Gene de Paul; Johnny Mercer (lyrics); Adolph Deutsch (musical direction); Saul Chaplin (musical supervision)
- Color process: Anscocolor
- Production company: Metro-Goldwyn-Mayer
- Distributed by: Loew's, Inc.
- Release dates: July 15, 1954 (Houston, Texas); July 22, 1954 (New York); December 20, 1954 (United States)
- Running time: 102 minutes
- Country: United States
- Language: English
- Budget: $2,540,000
- Box office: $9,403,000

Seven Brides for Seven Brothers is a 1954 American musical film, directed by Stanley Donen, with music by Gene de Paul, lyrics by Johnny Mercer, and choreography by Michael Kidd. The screenplay, by Albert Hackett, Frances Goodrich, and Dorothy Kingsley, is based on the short story "The Sobbin' Women" by Stephen Vincent Benét, which was based in turn on the ancient Roman legend of the Rape of the Sabine women. Seven Brides for Seven Brothers, which is set in Oregon in 1850, is famous for Kidd's unusual choreography, which makes dance numbers out of such mundane frontier pursuits as chopping wood and barn raising. Film critic Stephanie Zacharek has called the barn-raising sequence in Seven Brides "one of the most rousing dance numbers ever put on screen." The film was photographed in Ansco Color in the CinemaScope format.

Seven Brides for Seven Brothers won the Academy Award for Best Scoring of a Musical Picture and was nominated for four additional awards, including Best Picture. In 2006, American Film Institute named Seven Brides for Seven Brothers as one of the best American musical films ever made. In late 2004, the same year Howard Keel died, Seven Brides for Seven Brothers was selected for preservation in the U.S. National Film Registry of the Library of Congress as being "culturally, historically, or aesthetically significant."

== Plot ==
In 1850 Oregon Territory, backwoodsman Adam Pontipee goes to town for supplies and to find a bride. He meets Milly, the pretty young cook at the town bar. Seeing her strength, hardworking attitude, and culinary skills, he proposes. She accepts and they immediately marry, but upon arriving at the Pontipee mountain homestead, Milly discovers that Adam has six younger brothers—Benjamin, Caleb, Daniel, Ephraim, Frank, and Gideon—who are uncouth and expect Milly to clean and cook for them. Milly angrily ruins dinner and retreats to the bedroom, where she bans Adam from their bed. Adam, unwilling to go back downstairs and face his brothers' mockery, crawls out the window to sleep in a nearby tree; eventually, Milly and Adam reconcile, with Milly regretting her high hopes concerning marriage.

Milly begins teaching Adam's brothers hygiene and manners; eventually, this extends to advice on romance and courtship. At a town barn-raising event, the Pontipees display their newly acquired social graces as they meet Dorcas, Ruth, Martha, Liza, Sarah, and Alice, who are immediately attracted to the brothers. The women's initial suitors, overcome with jealousy, attack the Pontipees during the barn-raising. Although they keep their tempers initially, they fight back when Adam is attacked unprovoked. In the ensuing brawl, the barn is destroyed.

As winter sets in, the brothers pine for their loves back in town. To console them, Adam reads from Milly's copy of Plutarch's Parallel Lives about the Sabine women, whom the ancient Romans kidnapped to be their wives. Adam then claims his brothers should do the same to get their prospective brides.

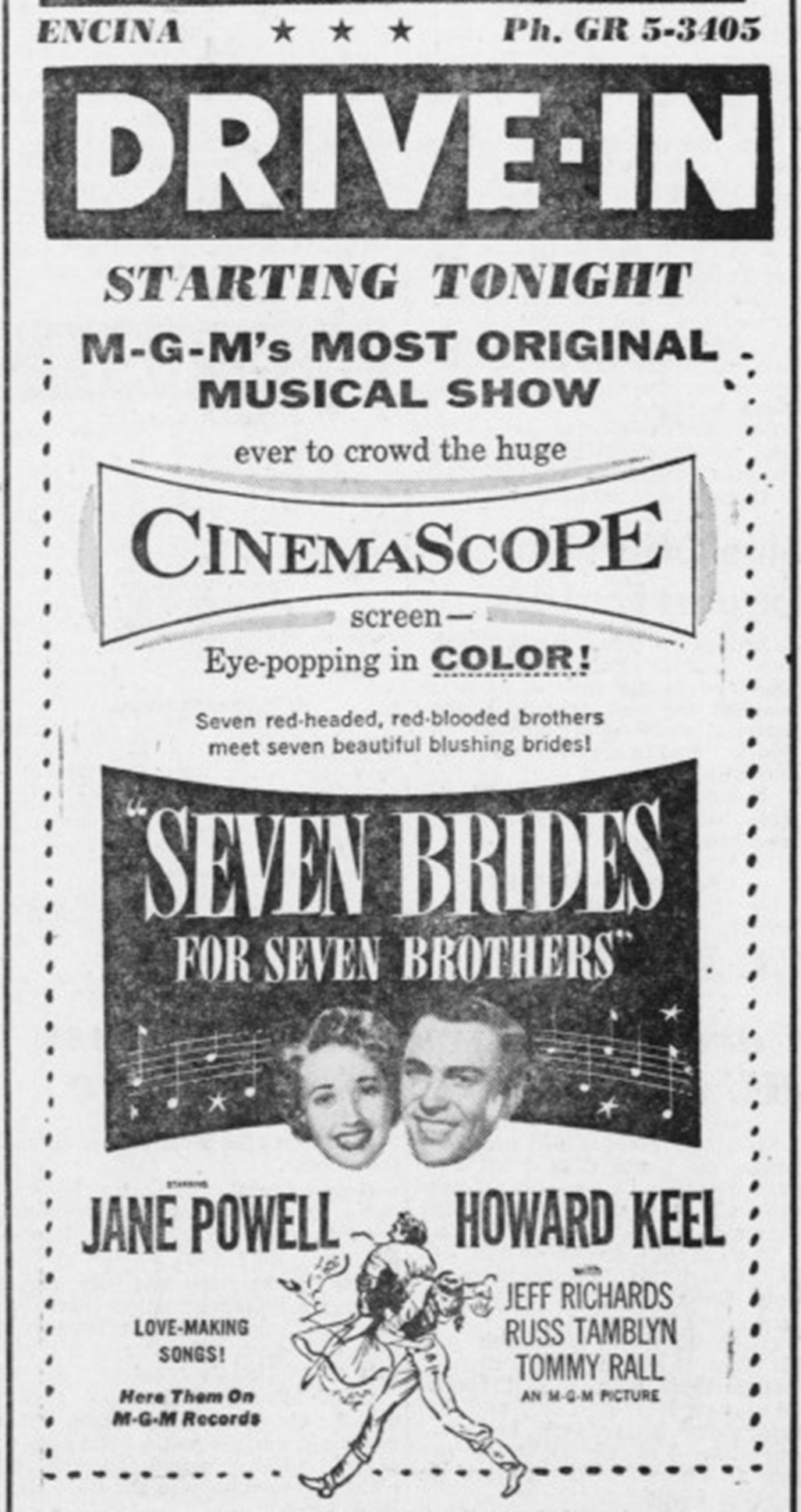
Drive-in advertisement from 1954

The Pontipees sneak into town at night and kidnap the women. As they race back to the homestead, the brothers trigger an avalanche that blocks the mountain pass, stopping their pursuers. However, the Pontipees realize they neglected to procure a parson to conduct the wedding ceremonies and are snowed in until spring. Milly is furious with Adam and the brothers and exiles them to the barn while the women stay in the house. Humiliated and angered by Milly's rebuke, Adam leaves for the Pontipees' trapping cabin to spend the winter alone.

Over the winter, the women vent their anger by pranking the brothers, but their feelings gradually soften towards them. Meanwhile, Milly reveals she is expecting a baby. By springtime, the women and the Pontipees have happily paired off. When Milly has a baby girl, Gideon goes to inform Adam, who refuses to return. Gideon chastises Adam over his selfishness and behavior towards Milly. Adam returns after the snow melts and meets his daughter. He and Milly reconcile. Adam admits that being a father, he now understands how families feel about their daughters and tells his brothers they must return the women. The heartbroken brothers agree to take them home. However, the women hide and refuse to go back. As the brothers search, the women's angry families reach the Pontipees' homestead.

As the townsmen sneak up to the farm, Alice's father, Reverend Elcott, hears a baby crying. Fearing the worst, he asks the women whose baby it is. They immediately conspire together and simultaneously answer "mine!" The fathers begrudgingly allow their daughters to marry the brothers in a collective shotgun wedding.

== Cast ==
The Brothers and their Brides:

- Howard Keel as Adam and Jane Powell as Milly
- Jeff Richards as Benjamin and Julie Newmar (credited as Julie Newmeyer) as Dorcas
- Russ Tamblyn as Gideon and Nancy Kilgas as Alice
- Tommy Rall as Frank and Betty Carr as Sarah
- Marc Platt as Daniel and Norma Doggett as Martha
- Matt Mattox as Caleb and Ruta Lee (credited as Ruta Kilmonis) as Ruth
- Jacques d'Amboise as Ephraim and Virginia Gibson as Liza

=== Brothers ===
To perform the dance numbers and action sequences, choreographer Michael Kidd wanted dancers to portray all six of Adam Pontipee's brothers. Kidd said that he "had to find a way to have these backwoods men dance without looking ridiculous. I had to base it all around activities you would accept from such people—it couldn't look like ballet. And it could only have been done by superbly trained dancers." However, he was able to integrate into the cast two non-dancer MGM contract players who were assigned to the film, Jeff Richards, who performed just the simpler dance numbers, and Russ Tamblyn, using him in the dance numbers by exploiting his talents as a gymnast and tumbler.

The other four brothers were portrayed by professional dancers—Matt Mattox, Marc Platt, Tommy Rall, and Jacques d'Amboise. All four balanced on a beam together during their barn-raising dance.

The wood-chopping scene in Lonesome Polecat was filmed in a single take.

- Adam (light green shirt): Howard Keel, a professional singer, appeared as the eldest of the seven brothers. He also appeared as Petruchio in the film version of Kiss Me Kate, and appeared in leading roles in other musical films including Calamity Jane, Rose Marie and Show Boat.
- Benjamin (orange shirt): Jeff Richards was a former professional baseball player who topped out at the AAA level of the minor leagues. Although obviously athletic, he is noticeably in the background, seated, or standing during the dance numbers so as to not expose his lesser dancing skills. This often relegated his partner, the classically trained ballet dancer Julie Newmar, to the background as well.
- Caleb (yellow shirt): Matt Mattox, a professional dancer, appeared on stage on Broadway and also danced in many Hollywood musical films. His singing voice for the film was dubbed by Bill Lee.
- Daniel (mauve shirt): Marc Platt, a professional dancer, danced the role of Chalmers / Dream Curly in the original 1943 Broadway production of Oklahoma!. He also had a dancing/speaking role in the 1955 film version of Oklahoma!, as Curly's friend who buys his saddle at the auction and complains about Ado Annie's pie.
- Ephraim (dark green shirt): Jacques d'Amboise, a principal dancer with New York City Ballet, was given special leave for the filming of Seven Brides for Seven Brothers (although he was recalled before filming was completed). He also danced in other musical films, including the ballet role of the Starlight Carnival "barker" in the film Carousel (in which he partnered Susan Luckey in Louise's ballet). D'Amboise's work as a dance teacher for children was featured in the documentary film He Makes Me Feel Like Dancin', which won an Academy Award and Tony Award.
- Frank (red shirt): Tommy Rall, a professional dancer and singer, appeared on stage on Broadway and in many musical films. His roles included Bill Calhoun (Lucentio) in the film version of Kiss Me Kate, and one of the Gallini brothers in the film Merry Andrew (in which he was one of the three featured acrobatic dancers in the circus engagement scene—Rall is the dancer in the center wearing the red shirt). He appeared in the film Funny Girl, as the Prince who partnered Barbra Streisand in a parody of the ballet Swan Lake.
- Gideon (blue shirt): Russ Tamblyn was cast in the role of youngest brother Gideon. Tamblyn showcased his gymnastics training throughout the action sequences. He also had a starring role in the musical West Side Story as Riff. As of 2021, following d'Amboise's death, Tamblyn is the last surviving actor who played a brother.

=== Brides ===
Professional dancers played all seven of the brides.

The four women whom Adam sees in the Bixby store when he first goes into town are Dorcas, Ruth, Liza and Sarah.

- Milly: Jane Powell channelled her experiences growing up in Oregon to create Milly. She and Howard Keel would later reprise their roles in a Seven Brides for Seven Brothers stage adaptation. Powell also appeared in dancing and singing roles in many other musical films, including Royal Wedding, Rich, Young and Pretty and A Date with Judy. In the film, Milly marries Adam.
- Dorcas Gaylen: Julie Newmar (Newmeyer), wore a purple dress in the barn raising scene. Dorcas is one of the more confident women, and has stated that she always wanted to be a June bride and have a baby right away. She is also the only girl shown to have a sibling, a younger sister. A classically trained ballerina, Newmar would later rise to fame as Catwoman in the 1960s TV version of Batman. She also won a Supporting Actress Tony Award for The Marriage-Go-Round (starring Claudette Colbert). She appeared on her neighbor James Belushi's sitcom According to Jim after the two settled a highly publicized lawsuit. Her singing voice for the film was dubbed by Betty Allen. Dorcas marries Benjamin.
- Ruth Jepson: Ruta Lee (Kilmonis) enjoyed a long stage and television career, appearing in dozens of films and TV series, working with Lucille Ball, Sammy Davis Jr., Elizabeth Taylor, Natalie Wood, and Frank Sinatra. Lee appeared in the sitcom Roseanne as the first girlfriend of Roseanne's mother. Her singing parts for the film were dubbed in post-production by Betty Noyes. She is wearing a blue dress in the barn raising scene, and is shown to like baking pies. Ruth marries Caleb.
- Martha: Norma Doggett performed in the 1940s–'50s Broadway shows Bells Are Ringing, Fanny, Wish You Were Here, Miss Liberty, and Magdalena. Her singing voice for the film was dubbed by Bobbie Canvin. She wears a green dress during the barn raising scene. Martha marries Daniel.
- Liza: Virginia Gibson was nominated for a Tony Award in 1957 and performed regularly, as singer and dancer, on the Johnny Carson show. She wears a pink checkered dress during the barn raising scene. Liza marries Ephraim.
- Sarah Kine: Betty Carr was also a Broadway veteran, dancing in Damn Yankees, Happy Hunting, Mask and Gown, and Fanny (alongside Norma Doggett). Her singing voice for the film was dubbed by Norma Zimmer. She wears a yellow dress during the barn raising. Sarah marries Frank.
- Alice Elcott: Nancy Kilgas made her film debut in Seven Brides for Seven Brothers. The youngest of the women in the story, Alice is especially close to Milly and wears a peach colored dress in the barn raising scene. Her father is the town reverend. Gideon falls in love with her at first sight. Kilgas danced in the film versions of Oklahoma!, Shake, Rattle & Rock!, and Alfred Hitchcock's Torn Curtain. Her singing voice for the film was dubbed by Marie Greene. Alice marries Gideon.

=== Townspeople ===
- Reverend Elcott (Ian Wolfe) is the local preacher and father of Alice, one of the brides. He is the officiant in both wedding ceremonies in the film. A longtime Hollywood character actor, he is perhaps best remembered for his roles as Carter, chief clerk to "Wilfred the Fox" (Sir Wilfred Roberts) in Witness for the Prosecution, Mr. Atoz in the Star Trek episode "All Our Yesterdays", as Father Joseph the Abbot in The Frisco Kid, and as "Hirsch", "Mrs. Carlson's" butler on WKRP in Cincinnati.
- Pete Perkins (Howard Petrie) is a leading citizen of the town where the Pontipees do their trading. Another longtime Hollywood character actor, he is also known for his role as Tom Hendricks in Bend of the River and as Mr. Lattimore, the prosecuting attorney in the Randolph Scott film Rage At Dawn.
- Mrs. Bixby (Marjorie Wood), co-owner of the general store in the town. Perhaps best known for playing Lady Lucas opposite Greer Garson and Laurence Olivier in Pride and Prejudice, she was a Hollywood veteran of 34 films going back to the silent film era. She died a year after shooting wrapped on the film.
- Mr. Bixby (Russell Simpson), co-owner of the general store in the town. A longtime Hollywood actor with 244 film and television credits to his name going well back into the silents in 1914, his best known roles are as Pa Joad in The Grapes of Wrath, and Red Kelly in San Francisco.
- Harry (Earl Barton)
- Matt (Dante DiPaolo)
- Carl (Kelly Brown)
- Ruth's uncle (Matt Moore)
- Dorcas' father (Dick Rich)

== Production ==
According to Dore Schary, Joseph Losey recommended the Stephen Vincent Benet story "The Sobbin' Women" as the basis for a musical film to Schary when the latter was head of production at RKO. Schary tried to get the rights but Joshua Logan had it under option for a stage production. When Logan dropped the option, Schary arranged for MGM to purchase the rights. Schary later said "everything worked" on the film.

Dorothy Kingsley was brought on to the film to replace Frances Goodrich, as well as Albert Hackett, who she said:

"...didn't get along with Stanley Donen. They were lovely people, darling . . . but the script just wasn't coming out right, they were unhappy, and he was unhappy. They wanted to bow out. Stanley Donen called me in and I looked at the script and said, 'The big trouble in the original short story is that the Howard Keel character is the one that tries to get all of these boys married off, and that's not right. The girl has nothing to do, and she's got to be the one to engineer all this stuff.' That was changed around and seemed to please everyone, and we went from there."

Choreographer Michael Kidd originally turned down the film, recalling in 1997:

"Here are these slobs living off in the woods. They have no schooling, they are uncouth, there's manure on the floor, the cows come in and out—and they're gonna get up and dance? We'd be laughed out of the house."

Lyricist Johnny Mercer said that the musical numbers were written at Kidd's behest, as an example "of how a songwriter sometimes has to take his cue from his collaborators." For example, Kidd explained to Mercer and dePaul both his conception of the "Lonesome Polecat" number and the lament of the brothers for the women, and the two then worked out the music and lyrics.

In his introduction to a showing on Turner Classic Movies on January 17, 2009, host Robert Osborne, as well as Jane Powell in her autobiography, The Girl Next Door, both say MGM was much less interested in Seven Brides than it was in Brigadoon, which was also filming at the time, even cutting its budget and transferring the money to the Lerner and Loewe vehicle.

Most of the movie was shot on the MGM sound stages. One exterior sequence not filmed at the studio was shot on location at Corral Creek Canyon in Sun Valley, Idaho. It was here that the escape following the brothers' kidnapping their future brides and the avalanche that closed the pass was filmed.

On the 2004 DVD commentary, Stanley Donen states that the film was originally shot in two versions, one in CinemaScope and another in normal ratio, because MGM was concerned that not all theaters had the capability to screen it. Despite the fact that it cost more than the widescreen version to make, he says, the other version was never used. However, both versions are available on the 1999 LaserDisc and 2004 DVD releases.

The dresses worn by the female cast were made from old quilts that costume designer Walter Plunkett found at the Salvation Army.

Howard Keel wrote in his memoirs: "Donen did a good job directing Seven Brides, but the real hero and brains behind it was Jack Cummings."

Donen later said making the film was "a nightmare because it was a terrible struggle from the beginning of the picture until the end."

== Songs and music ==
The "Main Title" is a medley of the songs "Sobbin' Women", "Bless Your Beautiful Hide" and "Wonderful, Wonderful Day".

In the film, Matt Mattox's voice is dubbed in by Bill Lee on "Lonesome Polecat". Mattox can be heard singing the song on the soundtrack album.

Song / Music Title	Characters	Vocalists (Singers and speakers etc.)	Instrumental Music	Year recorded
Main Title	N/A	N/A	M-G-M Studio Orchestra	1954
Bless Your Beautiful Hide	Adam	Howard Keel	M-G-M Studio Orchestra	1953
Bless Your Beautiful Hide (reprise)	Adam	Howard Keel	M-G-M Studio Orchestra	1954
Wonderful, Wonderful Day	Milly	Jane Powell	M-G-M Studio Orchestra	1954
When You're in Love	Milly	Jane Powell	M-G-M Studio Orchestra	1953
Goin' Courtin'	Milly and Brothers	Jane Powell, Tommy Rall, Russ Tamblyn, Marc Platt, Matt Mattox, Jacques d'Amboise, Jeff Richards, Howard Hudson, Gene Lanham & Robert Wacker	M-G-M Studio Orchestra	1953
Barn Dance	N/A	N/A	M-G-M Studio Orchestra	1953
Barn Raising	N/A	N/A	M-G-M Studio Orchestra	1954
When You're in Love (reprise)	Adam	Howard Keel	M-G-M Studio Orchestra	1953
Lonesome Polecat	The Brothers	Bill Lee and the M-G-M Studio Chorus	M-G-M Studio Orchestra	1954
Sobbin' Women	Adam & Brothers	Howard Keel, Tommy Rall, Russ Tamblyn, Matt Mattox, Alan Davies, C. Parlato, Marc Platt, Robert Wacker, Gene Lanham & M. Spergel	M-G-M Studio Orchestra	1953
Kidnapped And Chase	N/A	N/A	M-G-M Studio Orchestra	1954
June Bride	The Brides	Virginia Gibson, Barbara Ames, Betty Allan, Betty Noyes, Marie Vernon & Norma Zimmer	M-G-M Studio Orchestra	1954
June Bride (reprise)	Brides & Milly	Virginia Gibson, Barbara Ames, Betty Allan, Betty Noyes, Marie Vernon, Norma Zimmer & Jane Powell	M-G-M Studio Orchestra	1954
Spring, Spring, Spring	Brothers & Brides	Howard Keel, Tommy Rall, Russ Tamblyn, Matt Mattox, Alan Davies, C. Parlato, Robert Wacker, Gene Lanham, M. Spergel, Bill Lee, Virginia Gibson, Barbara Ames, Betty Allan, Betty Noyes, Marie Vernon & Norma Zimmer	M-G-M Studio Orchestra	1954
End Title	N/A	N/A	M-G-M Studio Orchestra	1954

== Reception ==
=== Critical ===
Review aggregator Rotten Tomatoes awards Seven Brides for Seven Brothers an 89% "Fresh" rating based on 28 reviews, with an average rating of 7.8/10. The critics' consensus states: "Buoyed by crowd-pleasing tunes and charming performances, Seven Brides for Seven Brothers makes a successful transition from Broadway to screen that's sure to please the whole family."

Contemporary reviews from critics were positive. When it premiered at the Radio City Music Hall, A. H. Weiler of The New York Times called the film "a wholly engaging, bouncy, tuneful and panchromatic package ... Although the powers at M-G-M are deviating from the normal song-and-dance extravaganza in 'Seven Brides for Seven Brothers,' it is a gamble that is paying rich rewards."

Variety wrote: "This is a happy, hand-clapping, foot-stomping, country type of musical with all the slickness of a Broadway show. It offers songs, dances and romancing in such a delightful package that word-of-mouth could talk it into solid business at the boxoffice." Richard L. Coe of The Washington Post declared: "Dandy dancing, singable songs and the ozone of originality make 'Seven Brides for Seven Brothers' the niftiest musical I've seen in months." Harrison's Reports called it "A thoroughly delightful blend of songs, dances and romantic comedy" with "exceptionally good musical numbers." The Monthly Film Bulletin wrote that the dances "give the picture its remarkably spirited and exhilarating quality ... A minor weakness is the playing of Jane Powell, whose Milly is a somewhat colourless figure; Howard Keel, the brides and the brothers, however, are all admirable."

John McCarten of The New Yorker posted a dissenting negative review, writing that the film "got on my nerves" and "struck me as desperately contrived and often witless", though he did concede that there were "some fine dances" in it.

Pauline Kael writes that the backgrounds seem to have been painted to fool the audience. In proving that it can "make things look real," Hollywood comes full circle in catering to mass audiences that prefer things that look like reality rather than illusion.

=== Box office ===
Seven Brides for Seven Brothers was the fifth most popular film at the British box office in 1955. According to MGM records it made $5,526,000 in the US and Canada and $3,877,000 elsewhere resulting in a profit of $3,198,000.

=== Legacy ===
The film came in third in a 2014 BBC Radio 2 listener poll of the UK's "Number One Essential Musicals" and was listed as number eight in the "Top 10 MGM musicals" in the book Top 10 of Film by Russell Ash. In 2004, the film was selected for preservation in the United States National Film Registry as being deemed "culturally, historically, or aesthetically significant." In 2006, it was ranked number 21 on the American Film Institute's list of best musicals. In 2008, the film was ranked number 464 in Empire's list of the 500 greatest films of all time.

=== Awards and nominations ===
Award	Category	Nominee(s)	Result	Ref.
Academy Awards	Best Motion Picture	Jack Cummings	Nominated	
Academy Awards	Best Screenplay	Albert Hackett, Frances Goodrich, and Dorothy Kingsley	Nominated	
Academy Awards	Best Cinematography — Color	George Folsey	Nominated	
Academy Awards	Best Film Editing	Ralph E. Winters	Nominated	
Academy Awards	Best Scoring of a Musical Picture	Adolph Deutsch and Saul Chaplin	Won	
British Academy Film Awards	Best Film from any Source		Nominated	
Directors Guild of America Awards	Outstanding Directorial Achievement in Motion Pictures	Stanley Donen	Nominated	
Golden Globe Awards	Most Promising Newcomer – Male	Jeff Richards	Won	
Laurel Awards	Top Male Musical Performance	Howard Keel	Won	
National Board of Review Awards	Top Ten Films		2nd Place	
National Film Preservation Board	National Film Registry		Inducted	
Online Film & Television Association Awards	Hall of Fame — Motion Picture		Inducted	
Satellite Awards	Outstanding Youth DVD	Seven Brides for Seven Brothers (for the Warner Bros. Edition)	Nominated	
Writers Guild of America Awards	Best Written American Musical	Albert Hackett, Frances Goodrich, and Dorothy Kingsley	Won	

The film is recognized by American Film Institute in these lists:

- 2006: AFI's Greatest Movie Musicals — number 21

== Adaptations and remakes ==
- Turkish film Beş Fındıkçı Gelin 1966 is a remake of Seven Brides for Seven Brothers.
- The 1968–1970 TV series Here Come the Brides was inspired by the film.
- The 1978 stage musical Seven Brides for Seven Brothers is an adaptation of the film, with a book by Lawrence Kasha and David Landay. Four songs from the film ("Bless Your Beautiful Hide", "Wonderful Wonderful Day", "Goin' Courtin'", and "Sobbin' Women") were kept for the stage musical; the rest of the score consisted of new songs written by Al Kasha and Joel Hirschhorn.
- The TV series Seven Brides for Seven Brothers, loosely based on the film, ran weekly on CBS from September 19, 1982, to March 23, 1983.
- The 1982 Bollywood film Satte Pe Satta ("Seven on Seven") is an unofficial remake of Seven Brides for Seven Brothers.
- Loosely remade by the Brazilian comic group Os Trapalhões in 1988 as the film O Casamento dos Trapalhões ("The Bumbling Ones' Wedding or Tramps' Wedding"). Instead of seven, there are four brothers (the members of Os Trapalhões); midway through the movie, they are visited by their four nephews, all members of the Brazilian band Dominó.
