= The Christmas Waltz =

1954 song by Sammy Cahn and Jule Styne

Song by Frank Sinatra
- A-side: "White Christmas"
- Released: 1954
- Recorded: August 23, 1954
- Studio: Capitol Studios, Los Angeles
- Genre: Christmas
- Songwriters: Sammy Cahn; Jule Styne

Frank Sinatra singles chronology
"It Worries Me" (1954)	"White Christmas" / "The Christmas Waltz" (1954)	"Melody of Love" (1955)

"The Christmas Waltz" is a Christmas song written by Sammy Cahn and Jule Styne for Frank Sinatra, who recorded it in 1954 as the B-side of a new recording of "White Christmas", in 1957 for his album A Jolly Christmas from Frank Sinatra, and in 1968 for The Sinatra Family Wish You a Merry Christmas. The 1957 recording made annual appearances on Billboard magazine's Holiday 100 chart from 2018 until 2022.

== Background and recording ==
Cahn recalls, "One day during a very hot spell in Los Angeles the phone rang and it was Jule Styne to say, 'Frank wants a Christmas song.'" Cahn resisted. "Jule, we're not going to write any Christmas song. After Irving Berlin's 'White Christmas'? The idea's just ridiculous." Styne was emphatic, however. "'Frank wants a Christmas song.'"

The two met in Styne's apartment to begin work on the project, and Cahn asked the composer, "'Hey, Jule, has there ever been a Christmas waltz?' He said no. I said, 'Play that waltz of yours.' He did so," and Cahn began work on the lyrics of "The Christmas Waltz", which many other artists have also recorded.

Referring to the line that goes, "And this song of mine, in three-quarter time," Cahn writes, "You'll notice there's an impure rhyme in that lyric, 'mine' and 'time'." He notes that another of his collaborators, Jimmy Van Heusen, would not have let him get away with such an imperfection but that Styne was not quite so rigid.

For what would become the B-side of "White Christmas", Sinatra first recorded "The Christmas Waltz" with a chorus as well as an arrangement by Nelson Riddle on August 23, 1954. On July 16, 1957, Gordon Jenkins took over the arranging, and The Ralph Brewster Singers provided backing vocal on the recording for A Jolly Christmas from Frank Sinatra. On August 12, 1968, Riddle again provided arrangements, but it was The Jimmy Joyce Singers who lent their voices to the recording for The Sinatra Family Wish You a Merry Christmas.

In 1992, Mel Tormé made a recording of the song for his first-ever Christmas album, for which the liner notes indicate that "Mr. Cahn wrote a new full set of additional lyrics as a personal gift to Mel."

== Commercial performance ==
There was not a version of "The Christmas Waltz" that reached any of the various charts in Billboard magazine until the 2003 holiday season when Harry Connick Jr. reached number 26 with it on the Adult Contemporary chart during a two-week stay that began in the issue dated January 3, 2004.

In December 2011, Billboard began a Hot Holiday Songs chart with 50 positions that monitored the last five weeks of each year to "rank the top holiday hits of all eras using the same methodology as the Hot 100, blending streaming, airplay, and sales data", and in 2013 the number of positions on the chart was doubled, resulting in the Holiday 100. "The Christmas Waltz" made its first appearance there during the 2018 holiday season, during which time it peaked at number 41. It also charted at lower positions on the Holiday 100 during the seasons from 2019 to 2022. (Note: See Charts section.)

== Critical reception ==
In their review of Sinatra's 1957 single that paired "The Christmas Waltz" with "Mistletoe and Holly", the editors of Cashbox magazine gave the former a letter grade of B+ and described it as a "lovely waltzer, which the master sings in his smooth, winning manner against a wistful choir backdrop." Billboard magazine wrote, "Song is unusually good in concept. Sinatra gives the three-beat item a stylish performance."

=== Cover versions ===
Jazz singer Nancy Wilson's version was mentioned in two AllMusic compilation reviews. For the first of the two, Merry Christmas, Baby: Romance & Reindeer, Dennis McDonald described it as "sultry". Regarding the second, Holiday Slow Jams, Anthony Tognazzini wrote that her version was "alone worth the price of admission".

== Personnel ==
Credits for 1954 and 1957 recordings adapted from Put Your Dreams Away: A Frank Sinatra Discography by Luiz Carlos do Nascimento Silva:

=== 1954 recording ===
- Frank Sinatra – lead vocal
- Nelson Riddle – conductor
- Si Zentner – trombone
- George Roberts – bass trombone
- Vincent DeRosa – French horn
- John Cave – French horn
- James Williamson – saxophone/woodwind
- Dominic Mumolo – saxophone/woodwind
- Champ Webb – saxophone/woodwind
- John Hacker – saxophone/woodwind
- Felix Slatkin – violin
- Harry Bluestone – violin
- Mischa Russell – violin
- Paul Shure – violin
- Walter Edelstein – violin
- Henry Hill – violin
- Victor Bay – violin
- Alex Beller – violin
- David Sterkin – viola
- Stanley Harris – viola
- Cy Bernard – cello
- Eleanor Slatkin – cello
- Edgar Lustgarten – cello
- Kathryn Julye – harp
- Bill Miller – piano
- Allan Reuss – guitar
- Joe Comfort – bass
- Lou Singer – drums/percussion
- Alvin Stoller – drums/percussion
- Lee Gotch – backing vocal
- Clark Yocum – backing vocal
- Charles Schrouder – backing vocal
- Mack McLean – backing vocal
- Gil Mershon – backing vocal
- Ray Linn, Jr. – backing vocal
- Burton Dole – backing vocal
- Allan Davies – backing vocal
- Marie Vernon – backing vocal
- Ginny Rees – backing vocal
- Betty Noyes – backing vocal
- Betty Wand – backing vocal
- Norma Zimmer – backing vocal
- Dorothy McCarty – backing vocal

=== 1957 recording ===
- Frank Sinatra – lead vocal
- Gordon Jenkins – conductor
- Allan Reuss – guitar
- Nat Gangursky – bass
- John Ryan – bass
- Bill Miller – piano
- Kathryn Thompson – harp
- Victor Arno – violin
- Harry Bluestone – violin
- Walter Edelstein – violin
- Sol Kindler – violin
- Joseph Livoti – violin
- Nick Pisani – violin
- Joseph Quadri – violin
- Lou Raderman – violin
- Mischa Russell – violin
- Marshall Sosson – violin
- Bill Baffa – viola
- Louis Kievman – viola
- Paul Robyn – viola
- Dave Sterkin – viola
- Cy Bernard – cello
- Armond Kaproff – cello

The Ralph Brewster Singers – backing vocals:

- Betty Allen
- Sue Allen
- Ralph Brewster
- Peggy Clark
- Barbara Ford
- Lee Gotch
- Beverly Jenkins
- Jimmy Joyce
- Gene Lanham
- Bill Lee
- Ray Linn, Jr.
- John Mann
- Thora Mathiason
- Dorothy McCarty
- Loulie Jean Norman
- Betty Noyes
- Thurl Ravenscroft
- Ginny Roos
- Max Smith
- Bob Stevens
- Bill Thompson
- Robert Wacker
- Betty Wand
- Gloria Wood

== Charts ==
=== 1957 Sinatra version ===
Chart performance for "The Christmas Waltz" by Frank Sinatra (2018)
Chart (2018)	Peak position
US Holiday 100 (Billboard)	41

Chart performance for "The Christmas Waltz" by Frank Sinatra (2019)
Chart (2019)	Peak position
US Holiday 100 (Billboard)	60

Chart performance for "The Christmas Waltz" by Frank Sinatra (2020)
Chart (2020)	Peak position
US Holiday 100 (Billboard)	58

Chart performance for "The Christmas Waltz" by Frank Sinatra (2021)
Chart (2021)	Peak position
US Holiday 100 (Billboard)	78

Chart performance for "The Christmas Waltz" by Frank Sinatra (2022)
Chart (2022)	Peak position
US Holiday 100 (Billboard)	68

=== Connick version ===
Chart performance for "The Christmas Waltz" by Harry Connick, Jr. (2003)
Chart (2003)	Peak Position
US Adult Contemporary (Billboard)	26

=== Laufey version ===
Chart performance for "The Christmas Waltz" by Laufey (2022)
Chart (2024)	Peak position
UK Singles Sales (OCC)	72
UK Vinyl Singles (OCC)	14

== Bibliography ==
- Cahn, Sammy (1974). I Should Care: The Sammy Cahn Story. New York: Arbor House. ISBN 0-87795-090-3.
- Silva, Luiz Carlos do Nascimento (2000). Put Your Dreams Away: A Frank Sinatra Discography. Greenwood Publishing Group. ISBN 0313310556.
- Whitburn, Joel (2004). Christmas in the Charts (1920-2004). Record Research Inc. ISBN 0-89820-161-6.
