= A Jolly Christmas from Frank Sinatra =

Studio album by Frank Sinatra
- Released: September 21, 1957
- Recorded: July 10–17, 1957
- Studio: Capitol Studio A (Hollywood)
- Genres: Traditional pop; Christmas; jazz
- Length: 32:54
- Label: Capitol
- Producer: Voyle Gilmore

Frank Sinatra chronology
Where Are You? (1957)	A Jolly Christmas from Frank Sinatra (1957)	Come Fly with Me (1958)

Singles from A Jolly Christmas from Frank Sinatra
- 1. "Mistletoe and Holly" Released: December 1957

Professional ratings
Review scores
Source	Rating
AllMusic	3/5 stars

A Jolly Christmas from Frank Sinatra is a Christmas album by American singer Frank Sinatra, originally released by Capitol Records in 1957.

This was Sinatra's first full-length Christmas album. It features the Ralph Brewster Singers along with an orchestra conducted by Gordon Jenkins. Side One features secular holiday tunes, while Side Two has religious Christmas carols.

Capitol reissued the album in 1965 with different cover art and a new title, The Sinatra Christmas Album, both of which also featured on the album's initial 1987 compact disc pressing. The original title and cover were eventually restored for subsequent CD pressings in 1990 and 1999. In 2001, the album art was altered from its 1957 version. The CD bonus tracks were originally issued on a 1954 Capitol 45 rpm single, arranged and conducted by Nelson Riddle.

In 2007 the album was reissued yet again, with a "50th Anniversary" banner placed atop the 2001 cover art and an additional bonus track (a vintage radio PSA that Sinatra did for the American Lung Association's "Christmas Seals" campaign) added.

In 2010, the album was reissued on vinyl for the first time since the Mobile Fidelity Sound Lab reissue, #1-135, c. 1986 (separate from the 1983 16-LP box), exclusively to independent record stores.

== Track listing ==
Side one
No.	Title	Writer(s)	Length
1.	"Jingle Bells"	James Pierpont	2:00
2.	"The Christmas Song"	Mel Tormé, Robert Wells	3:28
3.	"Mistletoe and Holly"	Dok Stanford, Hank Sanicola, Frank Sinatra	2:18
4.	"I'll Be Home for Christmas"	Kim Gannon, Walter Kent, Buck Ram	3:11
5.	"The Christmas Waltz"	Sammy Cahn, Jule Styne	3:03
6.	"Have Yourself a Merry Little Christmas"	Hugh Martin, Ralph Blane	3:29

Side two
No.	Title	Writer(s)	Length
7.	"The First Noel"	Traditional, arranged by Gordon Jenkins	2:44
8.	"Hark! The Herald Angels Sing"	Felix Mendelssohn, Charles Wesley	2:24
9.	"O Little Town of Bethlehem"	Lewis H. Redner, Phillips Brooks	2:06
10.	"Adeste Fideles"	John Francis Wade	2:34
11.	"It Came Upon the Midnight Clear"	Edmund Sears, Richard Storrs Willis	2:51
12.	"Silent Night"	Franz Gruber, Josef Mohr	2:31
Total length:			32:39

CD reissue bonus tracks
No.	Title	Writer(s)	Length
13.	"White Christmas (1954 single version)"	Irving Berlin	2:37
14.	"The Christmas Waltz (1954 single version)"	Sammy Cahn, Jule Styne	3:01
Total length:			38:17

== Charts ==
Chart performance for A Jolly Christmas from Frank Sinatra
Chart (2015–2025)	Peak position
Austrian Albums (Ö3 Austria)	14
Belgian Albums (Ultratop Flanders)	28
Belgian Albums (Ultratop Wallonia)	54
Canadian Albums (Billboard)	7
Danish Albums (Hitlisten)	19
Dutch Albums (Album Top 100)	17
Finnish Albums (Suomen virallinen lista)	32
German Albums (Offizielle Top 100)	12
Hungarian Albums (MAHASZ)	20
Icelandic Albums (Tónlistinn)	27
Irish Albums (Official Charts)	35
Italian Albums (FIMI)	79
Latvian Albums (LaIPA)	31
Lithuanian Albums (AGATA)	16
Norwegian Albums (VG-lista)	13
Polish Albums (ZPAV)	83
Portuguese Albums (AFP)	36
Swedish Albums (Sverigetopplistan)	13
Swiss Albums (Schweizer Hitparade)	5
US Billboard 200	23

== Certifications ==
Certifications for A Jolly Christmas from Frank Sinatra
Region	Certification	Certified units/sales
United States (RIAA)	Platinum	1,000,000^{^}
^{^} Shipments figures based on certification alone.
