= Tune Twisters =

American close harmony singing group

The Tune Twisters
- Origin: Manhattan, New York, U.S. ––––––––––––––––––––
- Died: Andy Love – 23 April 1911 Manhattan 8 July 1982 (aged 71) Greenacres City, Florida Robert Wacker – 9 November 1909 Manhattan 3 September 1985 (aged 75) Carlsbad, California Jack Lathrop – 11 May 1913 Sherburne, New York 30 January 2013 (aged 94) Stonington, Connecticut Gene Lantham – 7 November 1915 Lawrence, Kansas 18 October 1977 (aged 61) Los Angeles Johnny Smedberg – 20 March 1911 Coos Bay, Oregon 7 December 1979 (aged 68) Kaneohe, Hawaii ––––––––––––––––––––
- Genres: Swing; Vocal jazz
- Years active: 1934–1946

The Tune Twisters was an American jazz vocal trio founded in 1934 as The Freshmen by Andy Love, Robert "Bob" Wacker, and Jack Lathrop, who also played guitar. They were featured on radio broadcasts and recorded with jazz artists that included (i) Ray Noble in 1935 (with Noble, the Tune Twisters were initially known as "The Freshmen"), (ii) Bob Crosby in 1935, (iii) Glenn Miller in 1937, and (iv) Adrian Rollini in 1938. The Tune Twisters performed in the 1937 Broadway production, Between the Devil, singing "Triplets." The production ran from December 22, 1937, to March 12, 1938 (93 performances). During the audition, the Tune Twisters were known as the Savoy Club Boys. Lathrop was a member of the Tune Twisters in 1939 when they recorded the first radio jingle of its kind for Pepsi – "Pepsi-Cola Hits the Spot" (aka "Nickel, Nickel"). The trio also performed in two 1935 films, Sweet Surrender and Melody Magic, the latter directed by Fred Waller. Gene Lantham, in 1940, replaced Lathrop, who went on to become guitarist and vocalist with Glenn Miller.

== History ==
Andy Love, Jack Lathrop, and Bob Wacker began singing as a trio around 1928 or 1929 while attending a prep school near New York. Lathrop attended college in New York and Wacker got a job. Around 1933, Love suggested – to Lathrop and Wacker – commercializing their trio. Their launch was unsuccessful, and Love, discouraged, began singing as a soloist with Paul Whiteman. Eventually, the three auditioned for NBC Radio. After the audition, an NBC executive asked, "What do you call yourselves?" "You sure are some tune twisters." Love responded with a grin, "That's our name."

The Tune Twisters made their radio broadcast debut in 1935 as guest artists on a show hosted by Ray Noble, who discovered them in a Westchester County roadhouse nightclub. They continued to work with Noble until he moved to Hollywood to form a new until for the Burns and Allen programs. The trio subsequently performed in vaudeville on their own. They also performed with Fred Allen and Rudy Vallée hours.

In 1938, the Tune Twisters signed with NBC to perform for the Jell-O Summer Series, starring Jane Froman and her husband, Don Ross (né Donald McKaig Ross; 1899–1971), (Note: Jane Froman was married to Donald Ross from 1933 to 1948.) with the Alfonso D'Artega Orchestra. NBC's Red Network (radio) broadcast the show nationwide, beginning July 4, 1938. The show had previously been hosted by Jack Benny.

== Members ==
- Andy Love (né Andrew Jackson Love Jr.; 1911–1982), around 1934, was a vocal soloist with Paul Whiteman. In 1942, while singing with the Tune Twisters, he also sang with Kay Thompson's "Okays," her backup chorus. From about 1944 to about 1948, Love led a vocal quartet, "The Andy Love Four," who performed on air as guest artists of various radio shows, including the Lyn Murray Show. The Andy Love Four, with Evelyn Knight, performed "Bluddle-Uddle-Um-Dum" on a 1944 Decca recording issued to coincide with the 1944 re-release of the 1937 Disney film Snow White.

Love was one of three children born to Andrew Jackson Love, M.D. (1861–1948), and Anita Florence Hemmings (née Annie Williamson Hemmings; 1872–1960).

- Robert Wacker (né Robert Norman Wacker; 1909–1985), in 1936, while singing with the Tune Twisters, became a singer for the Bob Crosby Band, replacing Frank Tennille. (Note: Frank Tennille (né Francis St. Clair Tennille, Jr.; 1913–1989) was a wealthy heir to an Alabama furniture retailer in Montgomery, Alabama. George T. Simon's book, The Big Bands (4th ed.), incorrectly states that Frank Tennill (sic) was the pseudonym of Clarke Randall of Alabama. (The Big Bands, 4th ed., by George T. Simon, Schirmer Trade Books; 2012, p. 225))
- Jack Lathrop (né John Marcus Lathrop; 1913–1987) was a founding vocalist and guitarist with the Tune Twisters, who, from 1940 to May 1941, performed with the Glenn Miller Orchestra as guitarist and featured vocalist. In 1942, he was guitarist and vocalist with Hal McIntyre. After World War II, beginning around 1947, Lathrop was leader of the Drug Store Cowboys who, on the RCA Victor label, had several hits, including a hit duet with Eve Young, "My Darling, My Darling."

- Gene Lanham (né Eugene Prentiss Lanham; 1915–1977), in 1940, replaced Jack Lathrop. He was married, from about 1943 to April 1947, to Dorothy Lanham (né Dorothy Dee McCarty; 1917–2015), also a vocalist, notably of the McCarty Sisters, which included (i) Frances Catherine McCarty (1911–1963), (ii) Irene Sarah McCarty (1923–1998), (iii) and Jewell Faye McCarty – as well as (iv) Gene Lanham and Ben Lake. The McCarty Sisters had traveled throughout Europe singing as the Swingtette with the Jack Hylton Orchestra.

Gene re-married, on June 18, 1947, in Los Angeles, to Miriel Eloise King (maiden; 1917–2001). Dorothy re-married, on December 17, 1947, in Manhattan, to Andy Love.

Gene Lanham and Dorothy Lanham – under the name Dorothy Lanham – and also Robert Wacker, sang as members of the Ralph Brewster (Note: Ralph Brewster (né Ralph Fletcher Brewster; 1914–1990) was a jazz vocalist, notably a member of The Modernaires, vocal quartet that performed with Glenn Miller for two years.) singers on Frank Sinatra's 1957 recording, "Mistletoe and Holly." In the late 1950s and early 1960s, Lanham served on the board of the Los Angeles chapter of the American Federation of Television and Radio Artists. Lanham remarried – on June 18, 1947, in Los Angeles – to Miriel Eloise King (maiden; 1917–2001).

- Johnny Smedberg (né John Henry Smedberg; 1911–1979), born-and-raised in Coos Bay, Oregon, replaced Gene Lanham who left to serving in the U.S. Armed Forces during World War II.

== Selected broadcasts ==
=== Radio (1930s) ===
- 1940–1942: WOR; Ramona (Note: Ramona (Raymona Davies; né Estrild Raymona Myers 11 March 1909 Lockland, Ohio – 14 December 1972 Sacramento) was a pianist and vocalist and radio show host in the late 1930s and early 1940s. She once played piano with Don Bestor (1889–1970) and His Orchestra.) and the Tune Twisters – broadcast three times a week; sponsored by R&H Brewing Company – Rubsam & Hormann Brewing Co., found by Joseph Rubsam and August Horrmann in Staten Island. The sponsor was known for its theme song sang by the Tune Twisters, the "R&H Beer Song" (©1941), composed by Clarence Gaskill.

=== Jingles ===
- 1938: Pepsi-Cola Jingle (see also Sensory branding)

"Pepsi-Cola Hits the Spot" (aka "Nickel, Nickel")
The commercial, reportedly, aired over 1.5 million times

=== Broadway ===
- 1937: Between the Devil, the Tune Twisters sang "Triplets," December 22, 1937 – March 12, 1938 (93 performances); during the audition, the Tune Twisters were known as the Savoy Club Boys

== Selected filmography and discography ==
=== Filmography ===
- The Tune Twisters performed "Love Makes The World Go 'Round," in the 1935 film, Sweet Surrender – music by Dana Suesse, lyrics by Edward Heyman

=== Discography ===
- The Tune Twisters

"Pardon My Southern Accent," Johnny Mercer & Matty Malneck (w&m)
matrix 38617
"I Saw Stars," Al Hoffman, Al Goodhart, Maurice Sigler (w&m)
matrix 38648
Recorded September 13, 1934, New York
Decca (matrix 38617)

- The Tune Twisters

"By the Great Horn Spoon," Will Hudson, Eddie DeLange, Irving Mills (w&m)
"Here Come the British," Johnny Mercer & Bernard Hanighen (w&m)
Decca 233 (matrix 38647)
Recorded September 13, 1934, New York

- Victor Young and His Orchestra

Hal Burke, vocal
The Tune Twisters
"Zing! Went the Strings of My Heart," James F. Hanley (w&m)
Recorded March 21, 1935
Decca 426

- Victor Young and His Orchestra

Featuring Hal Burke and the Tune Twisters
"She's a Latin from Manhattan," by Harry Warren (music) & Al Dubin (words)
From the 1935 film, Go Into Your Dance
Decca 418 A
(audio via YouTube)

- Johnny Green and His Orchestra, with Marjory Logan (vocalist) (Note: Marjory Logan (née Marjorie Knight Logan; 1914–1978) debuted as vocalist 1935 with Johnny Green. She, in 1937, married amateur golf champion Dick Chapman (1911–1978) and divorced him in 1941. ("The Radio Reporter," section of the Screen & Radio Weekly – Joan Blondell on the cover – nationally syndicated newspaper supplement, by Bernes Robert, March 10, 1935, p. 14, carried in the Oakland Tribune, March 10, 1935; accessible via Newspapers.com; subscription required)) and the Tune Twisters

The songs:
John W. Green Medley - "I Cover The Waterfront," James Dyrenforth (w&m)
"I'm Yours" (Tune Twisters)
"Body and Soul”
"I Wanna Be Loved" (orchestra)
"What Now?" Johnny Green (music) & James Dyrenforth (words), featuring Marjory Logan (vocalist) and the Tune Twisters
"Not Bad," Johnny Green (music) & James Dyrenforth (words), featuring Marjory Logan (vocalist) and the Tune Twisters
"Sweet Sue, Just You," Victor Young (music), Will J. Harris (words) (orchestra, featuring the saxophone section)
Musicians: 2nd pianist (and arranger), Dave Terry
From Melody Magic, musical film directed by Fred Waller
(audio via YouTube)

- The Decca All Star Revue – 2 two-part productions:

Recorded January 15, 1935, New York
Part One: "You're the Top," Cole Porter, from Anything Goes
Decca 345 A
Part Two: "You're the Top"
Decca 345 B; matrix 39253

Recorded May 20, 1935, New York
Part One: "Way Back Home," Tom Waring, Al Lewis (w&m)
Decca 473 A; matrix 39529
Part Two: "Way Back Home"
Decca 473 B; matrix 39530

- Tune Twisters

From the 1937 musical Between the Devil, Howard Dietz (words); Arthur Schwartz (music)
Side A: "Triplets"
Side B: "I'm Against Rhythm"
(audio via YouTube)
Liberty Music Shop L-224; matrix 21876

- Adrian Rollini His Quintet

Bobby Hackett (cornet); Adrian Rollini (vibes, xylophone); Frank Victor (né Francesco Viggiano; 1897–1970) (guitar); Harry Clark (bass); Buddy Rich (drums); Sonny Schuyler (vocals), Tune Twisters (vocal trio)
Recorded June 23, 1938, New York
Side A: 23147-2: ("How to Make Love In") "Ten easy Lessons"

(© 24 August 1938) Harry Bailey (né Harry Preston Bailey; 1909–1984) and Doris Fisher (w&m)

Side B: 23148-1: "Small Fry," from the 1938 film, Sing, You Sinners

(© 10 May 1938) Frank Loesser (words), Hoagy Carmichael (music)

Vocalion 4212
(Discogs reference)

23148-2: "Small Fry" (Tune Twisters, vocals) Retrieval (E)RTR79046 (CD), Doctor Jazz; (Du)DJ-010-I-II (CD)
23149-1: "I Wish I Had You" (Tune Twisters, vocals) Voc 4257, Tax (Note: "Tax" is a Swedish jazz label founded by Carl A. Hällström. He explained that "tax" is the Swedish word for dachshund. The label bears the namesake of his first one (1953–1965).) (Swd)m-8036

(© 8 June 1938) Bud Green (words), Albert Stillman (words), Claude Thornhill (music)

23149-2: "I Wish I Had You" (Tune Twisters, vocals) Retrieval (E)RTR79046 (CD)
23150-2: "On the Bumpy Road to Love" (Tune Twisters, vocals) Voc 4257, Tax (Swd)m-8036

(© 21 June 1938) Al Hoffman, Al Lewis, Murray Mencher (de) (1898–1991) (w&m)

- Victor Salon Orchestra, Nathaniel Shilkret (conductor)

"Shine On, Harvest Moon," Nora Bayes and Jack Norworth (w&m), Anita Boyer (1915–1984) (soprano), with the Tune Twisters
Recorded June 5, 1940
Victor BS-051230
"Hello, 'Frisco!"
Victor BS-051232
Recorded June 5, 1940

- Evelyn Knight with The Tune Twisters (the Tune Weavers; Michel Ruppli's "The Decca labels: a discography," Greenwood Press, 1996); orchestra directed by Bob Haggart

Side A: "It's My Lazy Day," Smiley Burnette (w&m); (© 19 October 1944; E published 127229)
Matrix 73578
Side B: "My Fickle Eye," Ray Gilbert, Sidney Miller (w&m); (© 2 April 1946; EU15520)
Matrix 73577
Decca 18902
Recorded May 17, 1946
