= Alice Mason (real estate broker) =

American socialite and political fundraiser (1923–2024)

- Born: Alice Christmas; October 26, 1923; Philadelphia, Pennsylvania
- Died: January 4, 2024 (aged 100); Manhattan
- Education: Colby College
- Occupation: Real estate broker
- Years active: 1952-2009
- Known for: Changes in Manhattan real estate, political fundraising, dinner parties

Alice Mason (October 26, 1923 – January 4, 2024) was an American real estate broker, socialite, and political fundraiser. According to The New York Times she became one of the most powerful real estate brokers in Manhattan and was known as "the person you called if you couldn’t get past the [co-op] board." According to the New York Social Diary, her work "eventually changed the rules in high-end Manhattan co-ops, forever." The Real Deal called her "legendary".

Her dinner parties, held at least six times a year from 1962 to 2000, were prominent in Manhattan's social scene. In 1996 the Times called her "the hostess of the hour".

In 1999, a book by Lawrence Otis Graham, Our Kind of People: Inside America’s Black Upper Class, outed her as passing for white.

== Early life and education ==
Mason was born Alice Christmas to Lawrence Duke Christmas, a dentist, and Alice Meyers Christmas, a prominent African-American couple in Philadelphia, on October 26, 1923. She was raised in Philadelphia's Chestnut Hill. Her father was a founding member of the Philadelphia chapter of Alpha Phi Alpha. The family were light skinned and were known in Philadelphia's Black social circles as the "white Christmases". Mason's mother encouraged her to pass for white to gain access to opportunities that weren't open to Black women.

Mason attended Colby College, graduating in 1945 with degrees in psychology and sociology, and planned to become a dentist.

== Real estate career ==
After moving to Manhattan in 1952, Mason, then Alice Christmas, decided to change her name to Alice F. Mason and pass for white. She taught modern dance, including salsa, merengue, rumba, and cha-cha, to Broadway actors.

Mason became interested in real estate in 1952 after Gladys Mills of Gotham Realty helped her find an apartment, a studio on Manhattan's East 53rd. Mills offered Mason a job; according to Mason's memoir, Mills told her "she mainly handled movie stars", which Mason thought sounded interesting. Mason's early clients with Gotham Realty included Marilyn Monroe and Rex Harrison.

Mason became friends with Jeanne Murray Vanderbilt and her husband, Alfred Gwynne Vanderbilt Jr., and learned that as members of the nouveau riche and not listed in the New York Social Register, the couple were blackballed by Manhattan's most exclusive and sought-after upscale co-op buildings, which were controlled by so-called WASPs, white Anglo-Saxon Protestants. She helped the couple find an Upper East Side penthouse and recognized the business opportunity in helping similar buyers navigate co-op boards. In the late 1950s she founded Alice F. Mason Ltd.

In her memoir she described her strategy as "[making] a study of the establishment to figure out how to outwit them.” According to the Times

She urged one client, an Iranian businessman, to bring two large tins of Iranian caviar to impress the board of a co-op. She advised another to donate $10 million to the Metropolitan Museum of Art, since the co-op president was on the museum's board. And once, she told a Jewish furrier from the Bronx to open a bank account in Manhattan and find four people in the Social Register who could write him letters of recommendation; she told his wife to pretend she had a cough and not to talk during their interview with the board—to hide her accent.

Many of the clients she successfully got past co-op boards joined those boards themselves, which made her position even stronger. By the 2000s, the demand among the super wealthy for acceptance by exclusive co-op buildings had waned, replaced by demand for luxury condominiums that did not discriminate in the same ways, and Mason's intervention wasn't as in demand. She closed the agency in 2009.

== Dinner parties ==
Mason started hosting dinner parties for 20 in the 1950s.

Mason moved into a large rent-stabilized apartment on East 72nd in 1962, and she began giving dinner parties, which were prominent social events. Her guest lists included Kitty D’Alessio, Richard Butler, Helen Gurley Brown, Jimmy Carter, Bill Clinton, Richard Cohen, Walter Cronkite, Jaime de Pinies, Carmen Dell’Orefice, Dominick Dunne, Alia El Solh, Joni Evans, Alan Greenspan, Henry Anatole Grunwald, William Randolph Hearst Jr., Arianna Huffington, Marion Javits, Philip Johnson, Estée Lauder, Norman Mailer, Aileen Mehle, Mary Tyler Moore, Diane Sawyer, Lynn Sherr, William Styron, Kenneth Taylor, Blaine Trump, Gloria Vanderbilt, Elizabeth Vargas, Claus von Bulow, Barbara Walters and other prominent actors, business people, artists and writers, publishers and journalists, diplomats, and socialites.

Between 1962 and 2000, Mason usually held a dinner party six or more times a year with 56 to 60 guests, half men and half women, and no more than 18 married couples, seated at small tables of six or eight seated knee-to-knee to encourage conversations that included the entire table. Dinners were catered, sometimes by prominent chefs such as Daniel Boulud. They were generally held on Monday, Tuesday, or Wednesday, according to Mason "before people go away for the weekend". She generally held a party close to Thanksgiving, Christmas, and Valentine's Day, and timed the others to celebrate a guest of honor, including Alexander Haig.

By the 2000s, Mason was holding only a single dinner party a year.

== Influence and recognition ==
According to The New York Times, Mason became one of the most powerful real estate brokers in the city and was known as "the person you called if you couldn’t get past the board". According to the New York Social Diary, her brokering work "eventually changed the rules in high-end Manhattan co-ops, forever." The Real Deal called her "legendary". She was profiled in Steven Gaines' 2005 book about the history of Manhattan's upscale real estate market, The Sky's the Limit. In 1984 she was the cover story of the first issue of Manhattan, inc. magazine.

In 1996 The New York Times, referencing her dinner parties, called her "the hostess of the hour". Lawrence Otis Graham wrote she was "a constant fixture in the New York Society columns".

== Political fundraising ==
By the 1970s Mason developed an interest in political fundraising. She raised $252,000 for Jimmy Carter's 1976 presidential race, the largest amount by any single fundraiser, and $1.5 million for Bill Clinton's 1992 race. She often held fundraising parties for other Democrat candidates, including Robert C. Byrd.

== Outing ==
Around 1990, one of her dinner party guests was Lawrence Otis Graham, who in 1999 wrote Our Kind of People: Inside America’s Black Upper Class, which included Mason among a list of members of prominent Black families and publicly outed her as passing for white. In a March 1999 interview with Metro New York, she said "There are many people with family members who live on both sides. I've led this life for over 45 years, and it's all a state of mind."

Lawrence in 2006 told an audience that he hadn't realized at the time he'd written the book that his book was outing Mason.

== Personal life ==
Mason was married and divorced three times. She married Lt. Joseph Christmas, a distant cousin, in 1943. According to her unpublished memoir, he "didn't seem too interested in" passing for white, and the marriage ended within a year. She married Francis Richard, the French owner of a Berlitz language school, in 1957. The couple had one daughter, born in 1960, and divorced within a year, afterwards sharing childraising. In 1969 she married Jan Schumacher, a Dutch diplomat; the marriage ended in divorce within months.

Mason played gin rummy, using her winnings to supplement her income. She was a believer in numerology and astrology.

She died January 4, 2024, at her Manhattan apartment at age 100.

== See also ==
- Anatole Broyard, another prominent New Yorker who passed for white
