= Norma Doggett =

American dancer and actress (1925–2020)

- Born: August 3, 1925; Chicago, Illinois, U.S.
- Died: May 4, 2020 (aged 94); New York City, U.S.
- Occupations: Dancer, actress
- Spouse: Jack Bezwick (1970–1985)

Norma Doggett (August 3, 1925 – May 4, 2020) was an American dancer and actress.

== Life and career ==
Doggett began her career as a dancer, performing in the Chez Paree Club's ensemble in Chicago. She later worked at the Blackhawk Club.

Doggett's Broadway credits included Bells Are Ringing (1956), Fanny (1954), Wish You Were Here (1952), Miss Liberty (1949), All for Love (1949), and Magdalena (1948-1948).

Her films included Seven Brides for Seven Brothers (1954).

Doggett died in Forest Hills, Queens, New York City on May 4, 2020, at the age of 94.
