= Shake, Rattle & Rock! (1956 film) =

1956 film by Edward L. Cahn

- Directed by: Edward L. Cahn
- Written by: Lou Rusoff
- Produced by: Alex Gordon; James H. Nicholson
- Starring: Touch Connors; Lisa Gaye; Sterling Holloway; Douglass Dumbrille
- Cinematography: Frederick E. West
- Edited by: Robert S. Eisen; Charles Gross
- Music by: Alexander Courage
- Production company: Sunset Productions
- Distributed by: American International Pictures
- Release date: April 5, 1956
- Running time: 72 minutes
- Country: United States
- Language: English
- Budget: $79,000

Shake, Rattle & Rock! is a 1956 American musical comedy drama film directed by Edward L. Cahn and starring Mike Connors, Lisa Gaye and Sterling Holloway. It was distributed by American International Pictures. It was originally released as a double feature with Runaway Daughters.

== Plot ==
A disc jockey and a hipster battle adults trying to ban rock and roll in a small town.

== Cast ==
- Mike Connors (credited as "Touch Connors") as Garry Nelson
- Lisa Gaye as June Fitzdingle
- Sterling Holloway as Albert "Axe" McAllister
- Douglass Dumbrille as Eustace Fentwick III
- Raymond Hatton as Horace Fitzdingle
- Margaret Dumont as Georgianna Fitzdingle
- Percy Helton as Hiram, the funeral director
- Paul Dubov as Bugsy Smith
- Eddie Kafafian as Nick
- Charles Evans as Bill Bentley
- Clarence Kolb as Judge McCombs
- Fats Domino as himself
- Tommy Charles as himself
- Jimmy Pickford as Eddie
- Leon Tyler as Aloysius Pentigrouch
- Pat Gregory as Pat
- Rosie and Carlos as teen dance contest winners
- Annitta Ray as Annita, singing slum teen
- Giovanna Fiorino as Helen
- Frank Jenks as Frank, TV program manager
- Joe Devlin as squad car officer
- Pierre Watkin as Armstrong, editor
- Nancy Kilgas as Nancy
- Choker Campbell as himself
- Big Joe Turner as himself

== Production ==
Filming for Shake, Rattle and Rock! began on July 23, 1956. It was the first in a series of films for Sunset Productions, distributed by AIP.

== Soundtrack ==
- Fats Domino – "I'm in Love Again" (written by Domino as Antoine Domino)
- Fats Domino – "Honey Chile"
- Fats Domino – "Ain't That a Shame" (written by Domino and David Bartholomew)
- Joe Turner – "Feelin' Happy"
- Big Joe Turner – "Lipstick, Powder & Paint" (written by Charles F. Calhoun)
- "The Choker"
- "Rock, Rock, Rock"
- "Sweet Love on My Mind" (written by Wayne Walker)
- "Rockin' on Saturday Night" (written by George Matola and Johnny Lehmann)

== Reception ==
In a modern-day review, Allmovie called the film "endearingly awful" and awarded it film a rating of two stars.

== See also ==
- List of American films of 1957
