= Passing (racial identity) =

When a person classified as one race is accepted as another

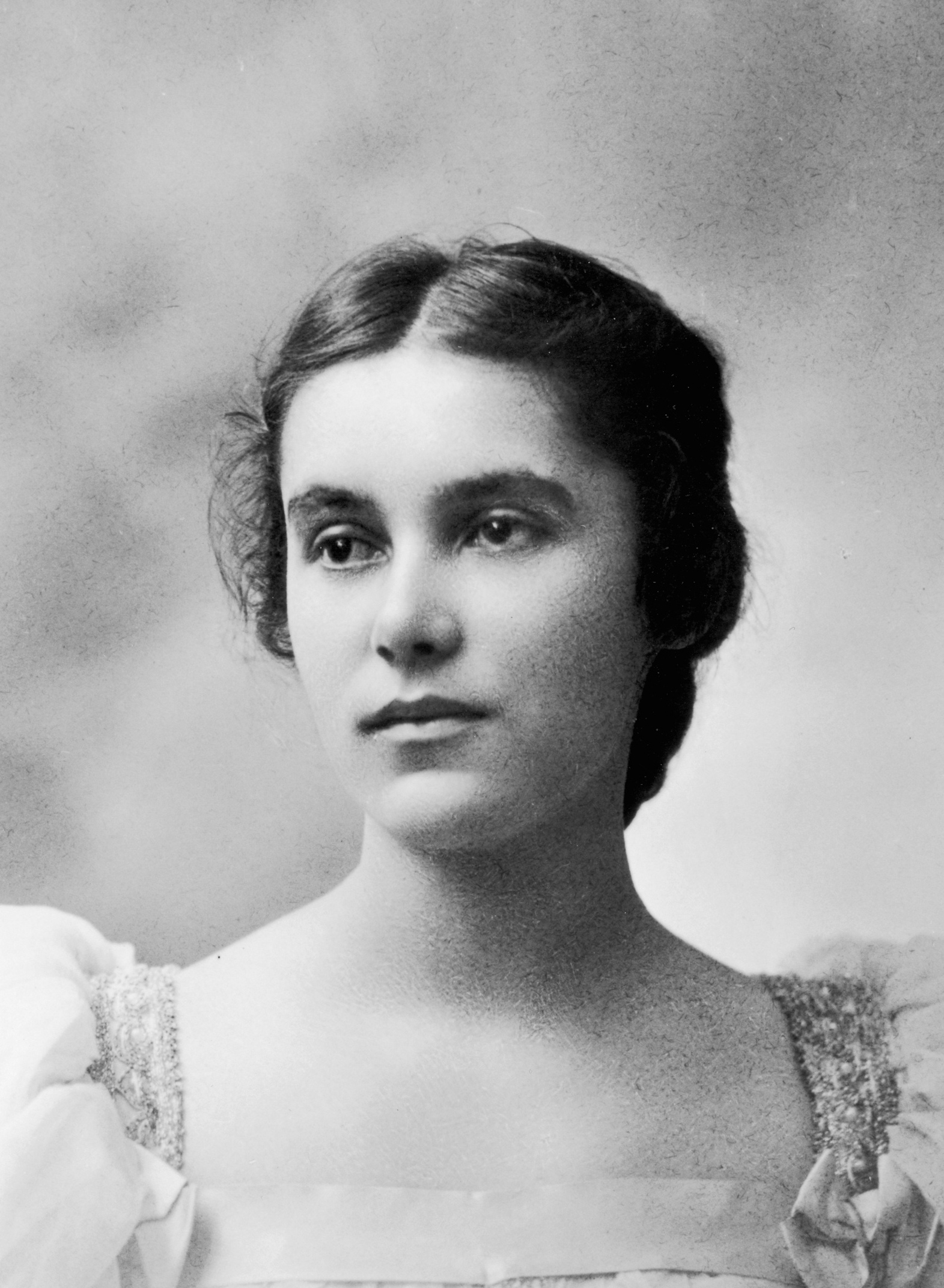
Anita Florence Hemmings, the first African-American woman of mixed ancestry to graduate from Vassar College, passed as white for socioeconomic reasons.

Passing, in the context of race, occurs when one conceals their socially applied racial identity or ethnicity in order to be perceived as another race for acceptance and other benefits. Historically, the term has been used primarily in the United States to describe a person of mixed race who has assimilated into the white majority to escape the legal and social consequences of racial segregation and discrimination. In the Antebellum South, passing as White was sometimes a temporary disguise used as a means of escaping slavery, which had become a racial caste.

== United States ==
=== Passing for white ===
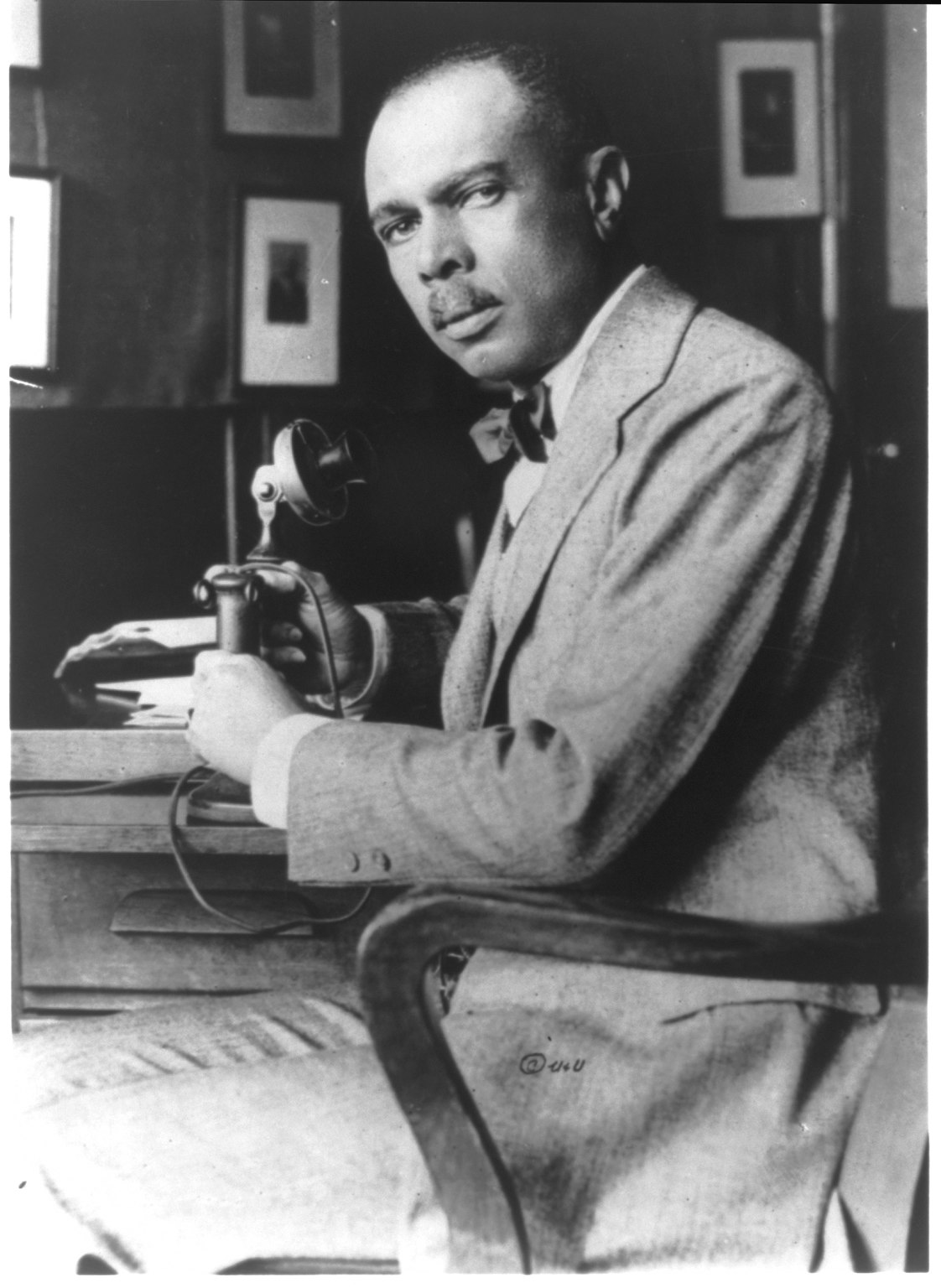
James Weldon Johnson, author of the novel Autobiography of an Ex-Colored Man

Although mixed-race people were often half White or more, institutions of hypodescent and the 20th-century one-drop rule in some states – particularly in the South – classified them as black and therefore inferior, particularly after slavery became a racial caste. But there were other mixed-race people who were born in colonial Virginia among the working class to unions or marriages between free white, almost exclusively Irish, women and African or African-American men, free, indentured, or slave, and became ancestors to many free families of color in the early decades of the United States, as documented by Paul Heinegg in his Free African Americans of Virginia, North Carolina, South Carolina, Maryland and Delaware.

For some people, passing as White and using their whiteness to uplift other black people was the best way to undermine the system that relegated black people to a lower position in society. These same people that were able to pass as white were sometimes known for leaving the African American community and getting an education, later to return and assist with racial uplifting. Although the reasons behind the decision to attempt to pass are deeply individual, the history of African Americans passing as white can be categorized by the following time periods: the antebellum era, post-emancipation, Reconstruction through Jim Crow, and present day.

==== Passing for Portuguese ====
Heinegg states the use of "Portuguese" as a term for a mixed-race person passing as white was documented as early as 1812. Some free Black people in the United States passed as Portuguese among their neighbors. They included the Perkins family, and the Cumbo family ancestral to the Lumbee. Several racial isolate groups adopted a Portuguese identity, such as the Melungeons and Lumbee. Belle da Costa Greene was able to pass as Portuguese, despite being of African-American descent.

=== Antebellum United States ===
During the antebellum period, passing as white was a means of escaping slavery. Once they left the plantation, escaped slaves who could pass as white found safety in their perceived whiteness. To pass as white was to pass as free. However, once they gained their freedom, most escaped slaves intended to return to blackness—passing as white was a temporary disguise used to gain freedom. Once they had escaped, their racial ambiguity could be a safeguard to their freedom. If an escaped slave was able to pass as white, they were less likely to be caught and returned to their plantation. If they were caught, white-passing slaves such as Jane Morrison could sue for their freedom, using their white appearance as justification for emancipation.

=== Post-emancipation ===
Post-emancipation, passing as white was no longer a means to obtain freedom. As passing shifted from a necessity to an option, it fell out of favor in the black community. Author Charles W. Chestnutt, who was born free in Ohio as a mixed-race African American, explored circumstances for persons of color in the South after emancipation, for instance, for a formerly enslaved woman who marries a white-passing man shortly after the conclusion of Civil War. Some fictional exploration coalesced around the figure of the "tragic mulatta", a woman whose future is compromised by her being mixed race and able to pass for white.

==== From Reconstruction through Jim Crow ====
During the Reconstruction era, black people slowly gained some of the constitutional rights of which they were deprived during slavery. Although they would not secure "full" constitutional equality for another century until after passage of the Civil Rights Act of 1964 and Voting Rights Act of 1965, reconstruction promised African Americans legal equality for the first time. Abolishing slavery did not abolish racism. During Reconstruction whites tried to enforce white supremacy, in part through the rise of Ku Klux Klan chapters, rifle clubs and later paramilitary insurgent groups such as the Red Shirts.

Passing was used by some African Americans to evade segregation. Those who were able to pass as white often engaged in tactical passing or passing as white in order to get a job, go to school, or to travel. Outside these situations, "tactical passers" still lived as black people, and for this reason, tactical passing is also referred to as "9 to 5 passing." The writer and literary critic Anatole Broyard saw his father pass in order to get work after his Louisiana Creole family moved north to Brooklyn before World War II.

This idea of crossing the color line at different points in one's life is explored in James Weldon Johnson's fictional Autobiography of an Ex-Colored Man. But the narrator closes the novel by saying "I have sold my birthright for a mess of pottage", meaning that he regrets trading his blackness for whiteness. The idea that passing as white was a rejection of blackness was common at the time and remains so to the present time.

African-American people also chose to pass as whites during Jim Crow and beyond. For example, United States civil rights leader Walter Francis White conducted investigations in the South during which he passed as white to gather information on lynchings and hate crimes, and to protect himself in socially hostile environments. White, who had blond hair, blue eyes and a light complexion, was of mixed-race, mostly European ancestry. Twenty-seven of White's 32 great-great-great-grandparents were white; the other five were classified as black and had been slaves. White grew up with his parents in Atlanta in the black community and identified with it. He served as the chief executive of the National Association for the Advancement of Colored People (NAACP) from 1929 until his death in 1955.

In the 20th century, Krazy Kat comics creator George Herriman, a Louisiana Creole cartoonist born to mulatto parents, passed as white throughout his adult life. Around this time, those who passed as white were referred to through French Creole slang as passant (passing) à blanc or pour blanc (as white).

The aforementioned 20th-century writer and critic Anatole Broyard was a Louisiana Creole who chose to pass for white in his adult life in New York City and Connecticut. He wanted to create an independent writing life and rejected being classified as a black writer. In addition, he did not identify with northern urban black people, whose experiences had been much different from his as a child in New Orleans' Creole community. He married an American woman of European descent. His wife and many of his friends knew he was partly black in ancestry. His daughter Bliss Broyard did not find out until after her father's death. In 2007, she published a memoir that traced her exploration of her father's life and family mysteries.

== Australia ==
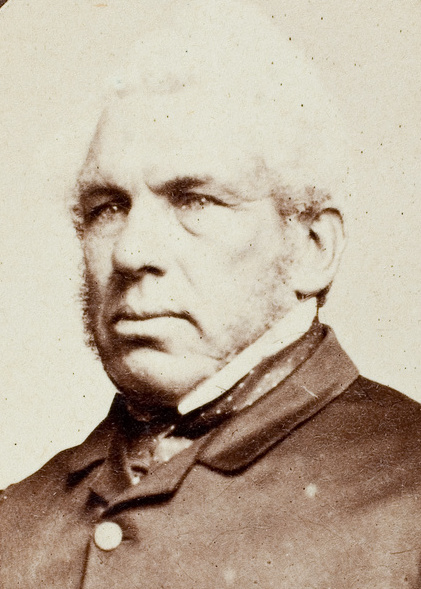
Edward Stirling

Edward Stirling, one of the early British settlers in South Australia, was the illegitimate child of a Scottish slaveholder in Jamaica and an unidentified woman of colour. Financed by his father's slave compensation, he passed as Scottish after arriving in Australia and became one of the colony's wealthiest individuals. He and his sons Lancelot and Edward Charles Stirling were all members of parliament.

Leslie Joseph Hooker, the founder of one of Australia's real estate firms LJ Hooker, concealed his Chinese ancestry during his lifetime, including changing his birth surname of Tingyou.

Similarly to the African-American practice, many Aboriginal Australians have passed as white to avoid legal and social discriminations. In the iconic autobiography My Place, a central theme is Sally Morgan, whose family passed as Indians, discovering her Aboriginal heritage.

In attempts to create an all-white society, the Australian government utilized eugenics to do something referred to as "breeding out the color", a term coined by A. O. Neville who was the Chief Protector of Aboriginals in Western Australia. The goal of Neville was to merge Aboriginals into society by reproduction with white males specifically. A major part of implementing this policy was taking mixed-race Aboriginal children away from their mothers to be raised in white households in hopes that they would better assimilate and be raised with the values of a white person, a time period referred to as the Stolen Generations. There were regulations created to enforce the legal kidnapping of Aboriginal children. In the name of their absorption efforts, scientists violated Aborigines through medical procedures and experiments aimed at interfering with their biological and anthropological identities. The "archaic caucasian" theory had a gruesome biological effect on indigenous Australian people.

The University of Adelaide made key contributions to the concepts and ideas that formed the policies enforced during these efforts. These initiatives left a lasting impact on the perception of Aboriginal people who up until this point had not been regarded as humans or counted in the census, which left them unable to vote or retain citizenship as indigenous people. These systems laid the foundation for a future of disadvantages in various sectors which had lasting detrimental effects on the livelihood, advancement, and preservation of Aboriginal people and their culture. The forced passing dismantled generations of families. Similarly to African Americans who mostly don't know their ethnic backgrounds due to the Transatlantic Slave Trade, many Australian people perform DNA testing to learn more about their identities and genetic makeup, in hopes to reconnect with and reclaim their identities to regain lost connection to culture.

Systems and events like this bred a culture of white rejection or refusal to be perceived and identified as white by indigenous people/Aboriginal people. The paradox and politics of race refusal are layered. The concept of race in regard to assimilation and chosen identity are interesting across the diaspora, with different cultures having different opinions and outlooks on what it means to pass and the act of being passing or choosing to pass out of advantage or necessity. Due to the historical context of passing in Australia, race refusal is common as indigenous people make their best efforts to maintain and connect with their indigeneity.

== Canada ==
Examples of racial passing have been used by people to assimilate into groups other than European. Marie Lee Bandura, who grew up as part of the New Westminster Indian Band in British Columbia, was orphaned and believed she was the last of her people. She moved to Vancouver's Chinatown, married a Chinese man, and raised her four children believing they were Chinese and French. One day she told her daughter Rhonda Larrabee about her heritage: "I will tell you once, but you must never ask me again." Marie Lee Bandura had chosen to hide her roots due to the prejudice she faced.

== Art and popular culture ==
The 1929 novel Passing, by American author Nella Larsen, centers around the concept of racial passing. Set in Harlem, New York in the 1920s, it follows the reunion of two childhood friends, Irene Redfield and Clare Kendry, both of whom are light-skinned mixed race women. Irene has married a black man while Clare has married a white man, from whom she conceals her African heritage. The novel was adapted into a film of the same name which feature in the 2021 Sundance Film Festival.

== See also ==
=== Concepts ===
- Acting white
- Race and ethnicity in Latin America
- Amalgamation (history)
- Assimilated Jews
- Blood quantum laws, also known as Indian blood laws (as in, Native American)
- Brown Paper Bag Test, also known as a Paper Bag Party
- Color-blind casting
- Color terminology for race
- Cultural appropriation
- Cultural assimilation
- Discrimination based on skin color, also known as colorism
- Good hair
- Lookism
- Passing (gender)
- Pretendian
- Racial fluidity
- Racial integration
- Racial misrepresentation
- Racial transformation (individual)
  - Racial transformation of Michael Jackson
  - Martina Big
  - Skin whitening
  - The Operated Jew
- Transracial (identity)
- White privilege
- Whiteness studies
- Racial whitening

=== Individuals ===
- Anatole Broyard
- Alvera Frederic
- Anita Florence Hemmings
- Alice Mason (real estate broker)
- Theophilus John McKee
- Merle Oberon
- Elsie Roxborough
- Mary Mildred Williams
