= Mistletoe and Holly =

Single by Frank Sinatra

from the album A Jolly Christmas from Frank Sinatra
- B-side: "The Christmas Waltz"
- Released: 1957
- Recorded: July 17, 1957
- Studio: Capitol Records, Hollywood, Los Angeles, California
- Genre: Christmas, traditional pop
- Length: 2:14
- Label: Capitol
- Songwriters: Dok Stanford, Hank Sanicola, Frank Sinatra
- Producer: Voyle Gilmore

Frank Sinatra singles chronology
"Witchcraft" (1957)	"Mistletoe and Holly" (1957)	"Nothing in Common" (1958)

"Mistletoe and Holly" is a 1957 Christmas song recorded by Frank Sinatra that was written by Sinatra with his longtime associate Hank Sanicola and Dok Stanford. The song was released by Capitol Records as a single and on the 1957 Christmas album A Jolly Christmas from Frank Sinatra.

== Background ==
"Mistletoe and Holly" was written by Frank Sinatra, Dok Stanford and Hank Sanicola, and published by the Barton Music Corporation in New York. It was recorded by Sinatra with The Ralph Brewster Singers and an orchestra conducted by Gordon Jenkins on July 17, 1957. Later that year it was paired with "The Christmas Waltz" as a Capitol Records single in the 7-inch 45 and 10-inch 78 rpm formats but did not chart at that time. Capitol Records also released the song in 1960 as "The Christmas Seal Song", a special 7-inch single with an introduction by Sinatra, and shipped 2,000 copies to radio stations in the US that year to broadcast as a reminder to use Christmas Seals.

In 2012 the song was remixed by Kaskade.

== Critical reception ==
Billboard magazine wrote, "Sinatra gives this one a crisp and polished vocal to a tasteful backing." Cashbox magazine described the song as a "contagious lilter" and concluded, "Pretty ditty with that wonderful Xmas spirit."

== Commercial performance ==
In December 2011, Billboard began a Hot Holiday Songs chart with 50 positions that monitored the last five weeks of each year to "rank the top holiday hits of all eras using the same methodology as the Hot 100, blending streaming, airplay, and sales data", and in 2013 the number of positions on the chart was doubled, resulting in the Holiday 100. "Mistletoe and Holly" made its first appearance there during the 2016 holiday season, during which time it peaked at number 70. It also charted at lower positions on the Holiday 100 during the seasons from 2017 to 2023. (Note: See Charts section.)

== Personnel ==
Credits adapted from Put Your Dreams Away: A Frank Sinatra Discography by Luiz Carlos do Nascimento Silva:

- Frank Sinatra – lead vocal
- Gordon Jenkins – conductor
- Allan Reuss – guitar
- Nat Gangursky – bass
- John Ryan – bass
- Bill Miller – piano
- Kathryn Thompson – harp
- Ralph Hancoll – drums
- Victor Arno – violin
- Walter Edelstein – violin
- David Frisina – violin
- Sol Kindler – violin
- Joseph Livoti – violin
- Nick Pisani – violin
- Joseph Quadri – violin
- Lou Raderman – violin
- Mischa Russell – violin
- Marshall Sosson – violin
- Bill Baffa – viola
- Louis Kievman – viola
- Paul Robyn – viola
- Dave Sterkin – viola
- Cy Bernard – cello
- Armond Kaproff – cello

The Ralph Brewster Singers – backing vocals:

- Betty Allen
- Sue Allen
- Ralph Brewster
- Peggy Clark
- Barbara Ford
- Lee Gotch
- Beverly Jenkins
- Jimmy Joyce
- Gene Lanham
- Bill Lee
- Ray Linn, Jr.
- John Mann
- Thora Mathiason
- Dorothy McCarty
- Loulie Jean Norman
- Betty Noyes
- Thurl Ravenscroft
- Ginny Roos
- Max Smith
- Bob Stevens
- Bill Thompson
- Robert Wacker
- Betty Wand
- Gloria Wood

== Charts ==
=== Original 1957 recording ===
Chart performance for "Mistletoe and Holly" (2016)
Chart (2016)	Peak position
US Holiday 100 (Billboard)	70

Chart performance for "Mistletoe and Holly" (2017)
Chart (2017)	Peak position
Latvia (DigiTop100)	58
US Holiday 100 (Billboard)	95

Chart performance for "Mistletoe and Holly" (2018)
Chart (2018)	Peak position
US Holiday 100 (Billboard)	92

Chart performance for "Mistletoe and Holly" (2019)
Chart (2019)	Peak position
US Holiday 100 (Billboard)	92

Chart performance for "Mistletoe and Holly" (2020)
Chart (2020)	Peak position
Portugal (AFP)	172
US Holiday 100 (Billboard)	94

Chart performance for "Mistletoe and Holly" (2021)
Chart (2021)	Peak position
US Holiday 100 (Billboard)	88

Chart performance for "Mistletoe and Holly" (2023)
Chart (2023)	Peak position
Sweden Heatseeker (Sverigetopplistan)	14
US Holiday 100 (Billboard)	98

== Sources ==
- Granata, Charles L. (1999). Sessions with Sinatra: Frank Sinatra and the Art of Recording. Chicago Review Press. ISBN 1-55652-509-5
- Phasey, Chris (1995). Francis Albert Sinatra: Tracked Down (Discography). Buckland Publications. ISBN 0-7212-0935-1
- Summers, Antony and Swan, Robbyn (2005). Sinatra: The Life. Doubleday. ISBN 0-552-15331-1
