= Between the Devil =

- Sheet music cover (cropped)
- Music: Arthur Schwartz
- Lyrics: Howard Dietz
- Book: Howard Dietz
- Productions: 1937 Broadway

Between the Devil is a musical comedy with book and lyrics by Howard Dietz and music by Arthur Schwartz.

== Production and background ==
The musical opened in pre-Broadway tryouts in New Haven and Philadelphia in October 1937. The original plot had the leading man, Jack Buchanan, as an Englishman who married two women at the same time. The plot was changed to have Buchanan marry the second wife only because he thought his first wife had died. Produced by Lee Shubert and J. J. Shubert, the Broadway production opened on December 22, 1937, at the Imperial Theatre and closed on March 12, 1938, after 93 performances. The production was staged by Hassard Short, the book was staged by John Hayden, and dances and principals' numbers were staged by Robert Alton. The cast starred Jack Buchanan as Peter Anthony and Pierre Antoine, Evelyn Laye as Natalie Rives, Adele Dixon as Claudette Gilbert, and Charles Walters as Freddie Hill.

The show was only a moderate success but introduced the songs "By Myself" and "Triplets", both of which were used 16 years later in the 1953 film, The Band Wagon, which also starred Buchanan. The song "By Myself" was also covered by Leonard Nimoy 14 years after the movie (and included on his second album Two Sides of Leonard Nimoy) in 1968. It was also recorded by Polly Bergen in 1958.

== Songs ==
Act I

- I See Your Face Before Me - Natalie Rives
- I See Your Face Before Me (Reprise) - Claudette Gilbert
- The Night Before the Morning After - Freddie Hill and The Debonaires
- Don't Go Away, Monsieur - Claudette Gilbert and Pierre Antoine
- Experience - Pierre Antoine
- Five O’Clock - Annabelle Scott and The Debonaires
- The Cocktail - Ensemble
- Triplets - The Tune Twisters
- Fly By Night - Ensemble
- You Have Everything - Freddie Hill and Annabelle Scott
- Bye Bye Butterfly Lover - Natalie Rives, The Debonaires and Boys
- Celina Couldn't Say No - Claudette Gilbert, Natalie Rives and Ensemble

Act II

- Front Page News - Ensemble
- Why Did You Do It? - Natalie Rives and Ensemble
- By Myself - Pierre Antoine
- The Gendarme - Pierre Antoine and Claudette Gilbert
- The Gendarme (Reprise) - Claudette Gilbert and Raymond Mauroís
- I'm Against Rhythm - Freddie Hill and Annabelle Scott

== Critical response ==
In The New York Times, reviewer Brooks Atkinson praised the performers, with Buchanan distinguishing himself in the solo 'By Myself', Miss Laye "still retains her ranking as a blonde goddess", and Miss Dixon "stimulating in a more earthly style of conquest". He wrote of the musical: "If it were not for the book, 'Beyond the Devil' would probably look and sound as frisky as it pretends to be. But, oh these bigamists! Oh, these wicked Parisian chanteuses! Oh, these improper situations! Oh!"
