= Screen & Radio Weekly =

Former tabloid magazine

- Categories: Entertainment; Fan magazine Print syndication
- Frequency: Weekly
- Circulation: 1,700,000 (April 1935)
- First issue: April 29, 1934; Janet Gaynor (cover photo)
- Company: Detroit Free Press
- Country: U.S.
- Based in: Detroit
- Language: English
- OCLC: 801245070

Screen & Radio Weekly was a nationally syndicated Sunday tabloid-newspaper-supplement published by the Detroit Free Press from 1934 to 1940 that covered film, radio, and fashion – and included a short story.

== History ==
The concept for the publication has been attributed to Dougles DeVeny Martin (1885–1963), one of five 1932 Pulitzer Prize winning journalists from the Detroit Free Press, who, in April 1934, proposed – to Malcolm Wallace Bingay (1884–1953), managing editor – publishing a weekly tabloid supplement in full color, 16 pages covering cinema and radio entertainment "to interest adult-minded readers, with no salacious gossip and a bare minimum of press-agent claptrap." All factual material used, according to promotional material, was staff-written and each issue featured one short story.

The Detroit Free Press first published S&RW April 29, 1934, with a photo of Janet Gaynor on the cover – an era marked by the Great Depression, before television. Full-scale commercial TV broadcasting did not begin in the United States until 1947. Movies and radio, in 1935, according to author Donovan A. Shilling, served as a relief for people living in an era of few jobs.

On the first anniversary of the publication (in 1935), circulation was 1,700,000 – reportedly more than any two other fan magazines combined.

== Editors, reporters, and contributors ==
A few S&RW columnists who also wrote for the Detroit Free Press used pseudonymous bylines and were identified as Free Press journalists, sans the word "Detroit."

Fashion and beauty

- Sara Day, pseudonym of Sally Richards (née Sara Lou Dague; 1904–2001), staff reporter, was billed by S&RW as the "Free Press Hollywood fashion authority." After earning a Bachelor of Science in Business from the University of Illinois in 1927, she became a fashion advertising copywriter for the J.L. Hudson Company in Detroit – then fashion editor for the Detroit Free Press, for whom she frequently traveled to Hollywood and New York on assignment. She married – on October 26, 1935, in her hometown, Danville, Ohio – Harold Grieves Richards (1907–1981). Shortly thereafter, they moved to Darien, Connecticut. She continued fashion reporting and freelance writing, traveling to New York, writing for the New York World Telegram. She and her husband moved to West Hartford in 1944.
- Grace Grandville (pseudonym of Grace Haedke; née Grace Mae Barber; 1890–1980) was staff reporter on beauty, Hollywood Bureau. She had been with the Detroit Free Press since 1918 and began writing for the newspaper in 1919. In the late 1920s, she became editor for "The Sunbeam Club," a popular children's membership oriented special section of the newspaper's Sunday magazine that ran through 1932 where she encouraged young readers to mail-in short stories, verses, and drawings. Around 1934, she began covering beauty for the Detroit Free Press under the byline Grace M. Barber while simultaneously covering beauty for S&RW under the pseudonym Grace Grandville. From 1940 until her retirement in 1961, she continued covering beauty for the Detroit Free Press under the name "Miss Grace." She married, on July 6, 1921, in Detroit, Walter R. Haedke (1892–1986). She also wrote under the byline, Susan Bartlett. She started out as a teacher in her hometown, Alpena, Michigan, then studied business at Cleary Business College, in Ypsilanti, earning a degree in 1918.
- Royer (pseudonym of Lewis Royer Hastings; 1904–1988), contributor, costumier designer for 20th Century Fox.
- Louise Shepard (née Louise Prescott Shepard; 1906–1967), tagged "Sketched by Louise," was a commercial artist who became staff fashion illustrator for the magazine. Before joining the magazine, in 1925, while working as head fashion artist for Frank & Seder's, she began teaching a new class in fashion illustration at Robert Herzberg's (Note: Robert Herzberg (né Robert Albert George Herzberg; 1886–1960) was a German-born American painter and illustrator.) Detroit School of Applied Arts at 3403 Woodward Avenue. She was married twice, first, from 1932 to 1939, to an airline pilot, Leonard Stanley Flo (1902–1973); then, from 1940 until her death, to a horticulturist, Elliot Bowen Coryell (1903–1986).

Film

- Douglas W. Churchill (né Douglas Wadleigh Churchill; 1897–1942), film critic. He also was a reporter, fiction writer, and screenplay writer. Churchill co-authored the story for the 1931 film Platinum Blonde, directed by Frank Capra. He married, in 1935, Lillian Templeton (née Lillian Evalyn Smith; 1903–1989), costume designer for 20th Century Fox – and in 1935, the only woman film stylist in Hollywood. When Churchill died, he had been the Hollywood columnist for The New York Times. Earlier, he had written for other publications, including Redbook, and the Los Angeles Times.

Hollywood

- Mollie Merrick (née Mary Merrick; 1891–1983), staff reporter, Hollywood Bureau. She was a native of Oakland, California. Before working for the Free Press, Merrick had been a newspaper writer since the 1920s and, since about 1931, published nationally syndicated articles copyrighted by N.A.N.A., Inc. (North American Newspaper Alliance, Inc.).
- Isabella Miller (née Isabella Taves aka Toews; 1905–2005), fashion editor for Screen & Humor Weekly, as well as College Humor, until about 1936, when she joined the copy staff of the ad agency, Anderson, Davis & Platte, New York. Mrs. Miller was formerly with the Butterick Publishing Company. In 1926, she earned a Bachelor of Science degree from Northwestern University, "with highest distinction" and Phi Beta Kappa. At Northwestern, she was Associate Editor of the Purple Parrot. She was married to William Moscrip Miller (1897–1956) from 1929 to 1944, then to Daniel Danforth Mich (1905–1965) from 1944 until his death. Mich was editor of Look from 1964 until his death and had been a member of the staff since 1947.
- Grace Wilcox, aka Edith Dietz (née Edith Grace Wilcox; 1883–1978), staff reporter, Hollywood Bureau, was column editor of "The Hollywood Reporter – Personal but not Confidential" and was Director of the magazine's Hollywood bureau. Before writing for S&RW, she had been a writer for the San Diego Union, the Arizona Daily Star, the Los Angeles Tribune, and the Los Angeles Express. In 1944, she wrote copy for J. Walter Thompson. She married – on November 25, 1916, in Los Angeles – mining-engineer-turned-banker, George W. Dietz (1881–1929).

Managing editors

- James Wilcox Hosking (1912–1952) was for 10 years Sunday editor of the Detroit Free Press. In 1944, he joined the Look magazine staff. His middle name, "Wilcox," was the surname of his mother, Carlotta Belle Wilcox (1879–1963). Hosking was a 1933 graduate of Kalamazoo College. He is not related to Grace Wilcox.
- Douglas DeVeny Martin (1885–1963), editor.

Radio

- Bernes Robert, pseudonym of Robert White (né Robert Burns White; 1901–1969) was a staff reporter and column editor of S&RW's "The Radio Reporter." He also wrote under the byline "William White." He married – on October 27, 1937, in Detroit – Betty Sloan (née Elizabeth Mary Sloan; born 1911), also a journalist who also covered radio for the Detroit Free Press. Sloan's father, Patrick J. Sloan (1881–1943) was the financial editor for the Detroit Free Press until his retirement in 1942. Betty Sloan, who also reviewed books for the Detroit Free Press, wrote a satirical review of a 1937 mystery novel by Sidney Clark Williams, The murder of Miss Betty Sloan. She titled it, "Startled Miss Sloan Reads Own 'Murder' – Mystery Tale Reviewer Finds Out How She 'Died.'" Robert White, a graduate of Wayne State University, worked in radio in executive roles with (i) The Ford Sunday Evening Hour (producer) (first two seasons, 1934 & 1935), (ii) CKLW, Windsor, Canada (assistant manager and program director) (before 1936), (iii) WOR, Newark, New Jersey (commercial production manager) (before 1937), (iv) NBC Radio Network, Chicago Studios (production staff) (beginning 1937), (v) U.S. Armed Forces Radio Station at Guam (station manager) (1952–1953), (vi) ABC Radio, Central Division (Public Service Director) (1943–1950), (vii) Progressive Broadcasting System (Executive Vice President, Chicago Office) (beginning 1950), and (viii) WXYZ, Detroit.

Theater

- Jack Sher (1913–1988), New York reporter.

== Archival access ==
The issues of Screen & Radio Weekly include neither mastheads nor volumes nor issue numbers – only dates. The Margaret Herrick Library – the main repository of print, graphic and research materials of the Academy of Motion Picture Arts and Sciences – holds issues of Screen & Radio Weekly. (OCLC 801245070)

=== Digital archival access ===
Newspapers.com

- Atlantic City Press
- Atlanta Constitution
- Brooklyn Times-Union
- Dayton Herald (Note: The Dayton Herald carried the supplement on Wednesdays as the Mid-Week Screen & Radio Magazine.)
- Detroit Free Press
- Des Moines Register
- The Macon Telegraph and News
- The Miami Herald
- Rockford Register-Republic, Rockford, Illinois
- Nashville Banner
- Oakland Tribune
- The Sacramento Union
- South Bend Tribune
- Star-Gazette, Elmira, New York
- Virginian-Pilot

GenealogyBank

- Chicago Daily Times (Note: The Daily Times, Chicago, carried the supplement on Sundays as the Screen & Radio Magazine.)
- Milwaukee Journal
- New Orleans Item
- Rockford Register-Republic, Rockford, Illinois
- Virginian-Pilot

Other

- Long Island Sunday Press
