= Hair of Gold, Eyes of Blue =

Song
- Published: 1948
- Genre: Popular standard
- Songwriter: Sunny Skylar

"Hair of Gold, Eyes of Blue" is a popular song. It was written by Sunny Skylar. The song was published in 1948. Popular versions of the song were recorded by Gordon MacRae, by The Harmonicats, and by Jack Emerson (né Abraham Jacob Melamerson; 1920–2014).

The Gordon MacRae recording was released by Capitol Records as catalog number 15178. The record first reached the Billboard charts on August 20, 1948 and lasted 14 weeks on the chart, peaking at #10.

The Harmonicats' recording was released by Universal Records as catalog number 121. The record first reached the Billboard charts on August 6, 1948 and lasted 9 weeks on the chart, peaking at #22.

The Jack Emerson recording was released by Metrotone Records as catalog number 2018. The record first reached the Billboard charts on September 3, 1948 and lasted 5 weeks on the chart, peaking at #24.
