= Nancy Kilgas =

American actress and dancer (1930–2022)

- Kilgas in 1957
- Born: Nancy Blanche Kilgas; November 7, 1930; Seattle, Washington, U.S.
- Died: October 28, 2022 (aged 91); Los Angeles, California, U.S.
- Occupations: Actress, dancer

Nancy Blanche Kilgas (November 7, 1930 – October 28, 2022) was an American actress and dancer, best known for playing Alice in Seven Brides for Seven Brothers (1954).

== Life and career ==
Kilgas was born in Seattle, Washington on November 7, 1930, to Carl and Frances Kilgas (née Hurlburt). An only child, her father worked as a credit manager. She attended Grant High School, before studying liberal arts at Vanport College (now Portland State University). In 1950 she moved to Hollywood and chose to pursue a career as a dancer.

In 1954, Kilgas landed the role of Alice, the bride of youngest brother Gideon, in the 1954 musical Seven Brides for Seven Brothers. That same year, Kilgas also starred in the musical Athena, playing Aphrodite. In 1958, she appeared as a dancer in the science fiction horror film Earth vs. the Spider. Television appearances included a 1958 episode of Mr. Adams and Eve, and the role of Jill Treadwell in "The Blessington Method" in season 5 of Alfred Hitchcock Presents (1959).

Kilgas died in Pacific Palisades, Los Angeles on October 28, 2022, at the age of 91.
