= Alvera Frederic =

American woman (1921–2014)

Alvera Rita Frederic
- Born: Alvera Rita Frederic; October 21, 1921; New Orleans, Louisiana, U.S.
- Died: April 5, 2014 (aged 92); Parma, Ohio, U.S.
- Resting place: Holy Cross Cemetery, Brook Park, Ohio, U.S.
- Spouse: Harold John Kalina

Alvera Rita Kalina, (née Frederic, October 21, 1921 – April 5, 2014) was a multiracial American woman from New Orleans who passed as white after moving north to Ohio. She married a white man, keeping her mixed heritage a secret from him and their children. She is the subject of White Like Her: My Family's Story of Race and Racial Passing (2017), written by her daughter, Gail Lukasik.

== Early life ==
Her parents were Camille Kilbourne and Azemar Alfred Frederic (1898-1946). On her birth certificate, she was listed as 'Col', or 'colored.' This classification was often used for multiracial people in New Orleans, who were sometimes known as Louisiana Creoles.

== Personal life ==
Alvera Rita Frederic Kalina was born in 1921 to Camille Kilbourne and Azemar Frederic. Camille was of English and Scottish heritage and Azemar said he was of French descent. Her parents had a brief union before divorcing when Alvera was young; both remarried and had separate families. Alvera grew up in the household of her mother and stepfather and half-siblings.

In the 1900 census, Albert Girard, Azemar's maternal grandfather, was listed as head of his household. Both he and Celeste Girard Frederic, Azemar's mother, were listed on the 1900 census with the appellation 'B' in the column for race, indicating that they were classified as black. Azemar's father was Leon Frederic, who also lived in the Girard-headed household at 379 Ursuline Avenue in New Orleans, and was classified on the census as black.

When Azemar and Camille married, they lived at 2921 St. Ann St., where Alvera was born. Under the rules of the day in the south (the one-drop rule), Alvera, their daughter and also a descendant of French-Creoles, would be considered black. But, in the 1930 census, her father Azemar Frederic was classified as W—or white.

The 1940 census listed Alvera Frederic as 'Negro'. She was then working as a server in a teashop. During World War II, she served in the Women's Army Corps. By 1944 she had moved north to Ohio, where she settled. She passed as white and married Harold Kalina, a white man. They had two children together, who were raised as Catholic, as Alvera had been.

Like some other Americans with Black heritage at the time, Alvera passed as white for socioeconomic benefit. She later feared her Ohio friends finding out what was, for the time, a 'dirty secret'. She did not inform their children of their complex racial heritage.

(The following sources discuss the life of Anita Hemmings, a multiracial woman of Boston who passed as white to attend Vassar. She and her multiracial physician husband raised their children as white for opportunity, and some later generations did not learn the full story of their complex heritage until later adult life.)

Harold Kalina died in 1995. Their grown married daughter, Gail Lukasik, had been researching her mother's family and in 1997 confronted her mother with some of her findings. She had learned that Alvera was listed as 'colored' on her birth certificate and Black (Negro) in a later census. (These records had been confirmed by the State of Louisiana in a letter.) Alvera at first denied these records, then she broke down and confessed. She made Gail swear not to tell a soul, not even her brother, until she died. Gail kept this promise for 17 years.

When Gail learned about her mother's (and her) ancestry, her mother's quirks seemed to fall into place. Alvera wore make-up to bed, saying it was "in case you suddenly took ill and went to a hospital you had to look your best!". She stayed out of sunlight, and kept her house obsessively neat. She led the Kalina family in dramatic Sunday church entrances, where they took the first pew. A neighbor derided them as 'the first family'. Gail confided what she had learned to her husband and their own children, who seemed not the least encumbered by their newly found black heritage.

== Genealogy Roadshow ==
Gail's son, a PhD. candidate, became the family researcher and compiled a binder that contained the family history.

Then came the Genealogy Roadshow. Its staff did follow-up investigations and a DNA test.

Gail's story was chosen for a television episode that traced her genealogy from a free man of color, Leon Frederic, who served in the Louisiana Native Guards during the Civil War. Gail retained rights to the story. They shot backstory with her in her hometown on August 7, 2014, in Libertyville, Illinois.

Lukasik had kept her mother's secret for years before publishing her family account in a book, White Like Her: My Family's Story of Race and Racial Passing (2017).
