= Karin Tanabe =

American historical fiction novelist

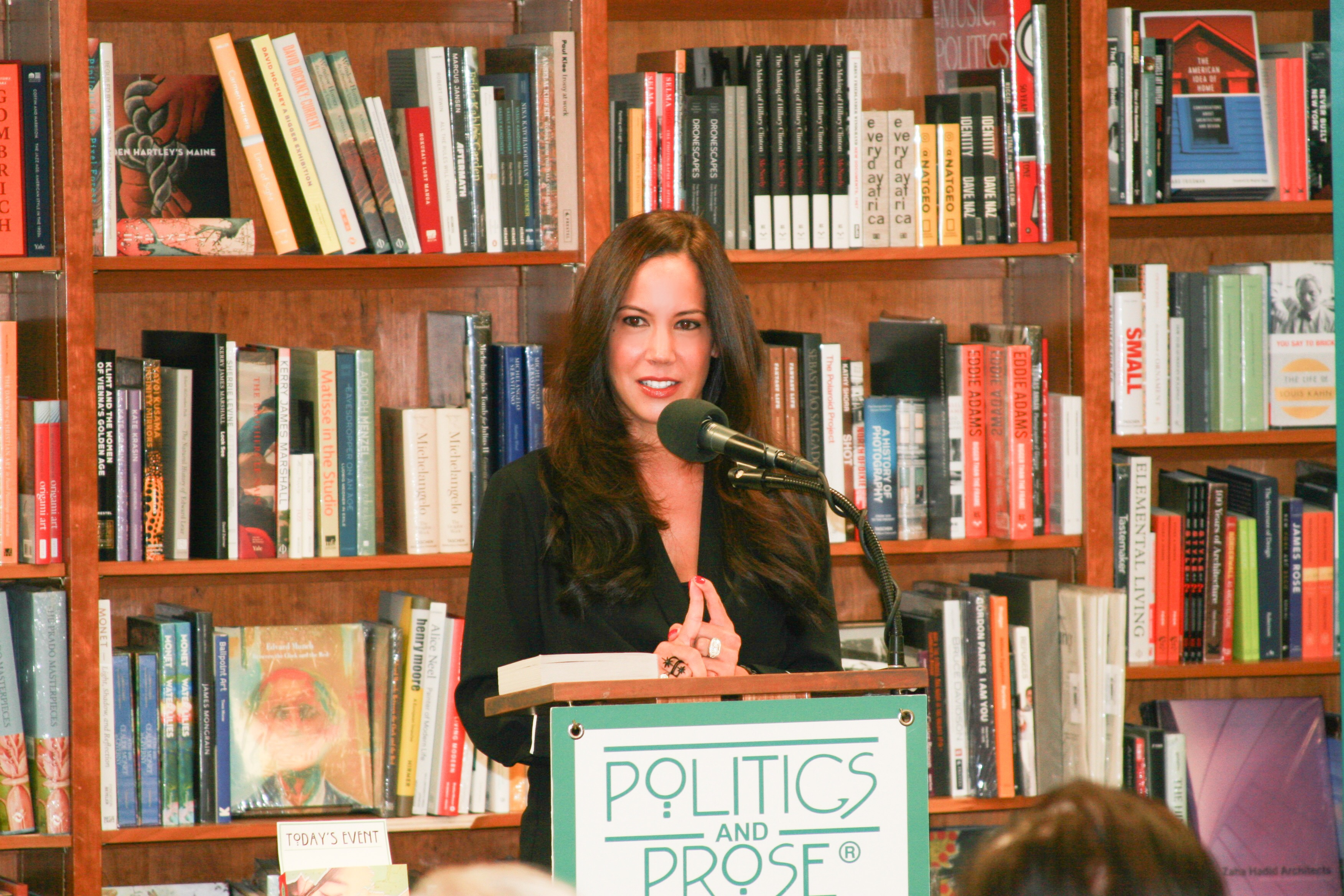
- Born: United States
- Education: Vassar College
- Writing career
- Notable works: The Gilded Years: A Novel, The Diplomat's Daughter: A Novel

Karin Tanabe is a historical fiction novelist who is best known for her works The Gilded Years: A Novel, a novel about the first African-American graduate of Vassar College, and The Diplomat's Daughter: A Novel, a love story set in a Japanese American internment camp. National Public Radio has described her as a "master of historical fiction".

== Biography ==
Tanabe is a first-generation American who grew up in Washington, D.C., with foreign parents. Her father Kunio Francis Tanabe is from Yokohama and is the former Book World art director and senior editor at The Washington Post. Tanabe holds American and Belgian passports and speaks French and English.

Tanabe graduated from Vassar College and currently lives in Washington, D.C., with her husband, daughter, and son. Until 2017, she was a reporter at Politico.

In 2025, Tanabe produced, and was featured in, the PBS documentary "Atomic Echoes."

== List of works ==
- The List: A Novel (2013) – a novel about a young reporter inspired by Tanabe's experiences at Politico
- The Price of Inheritance: A Novel (2014) – a drama set in the high-end antique furniture world
- The Gilded Years: A Novel (2016) – a historical fiction novel about the first African-American graduate of Vassar College
- The Diplomat's Daughter (2017) – a love story set in a Japanese American internment camp
- A Hundred Suns: A Novel (2020) – a thriller set in 1930s French Indochina
- A Woman of Intelligence (2021) – Cold War spy novel
- The Sunset Crowd (2023) – a story of a glamorous female grifter in 1970s Hollywood
