= Sunny Skylar =

American composer, singer, lyricist, and music publisher (1913–2009)

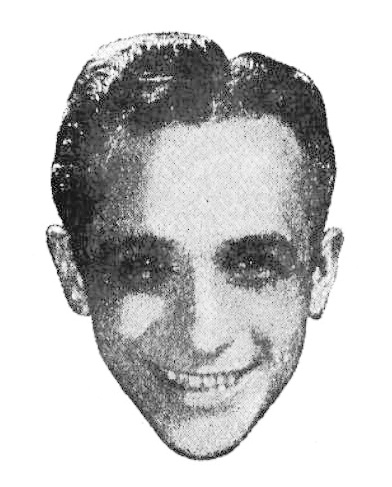
- Sunny Skylar in a 1944 advertisement

Background information
- Also known as: Sonny Schuyler, Sonny Skyler
- Born: Selig Sidney Shaftel; October 11, 1913; New York City, US
- Died: February 2, 2009 (aged 95) Las Vegas, Nevada, US
- Genres: Jazz, Big Band, Tin Pan Alley
- Occupations: Music composer, lyricist, singer, publisher
- Instruments: Vocals, piano
- Labels: Decca Records, Capitol Records, Mercury Records, Bluebird Records, Columbia Records, RCA Victor Records, MGM Records, Universal Music Group, Warner Brother Records, Atlantic Records, Apple Records, Polydor Records, EMI Records, Sony Classical Records, CBS Record Group
- Formerly of: Vincent Lopez, Abe Lyman, Paul Whiteman, Ben Bernie, Jack Denny, Freddie Perren, George Hall, Henry (Hank) Sylvern, Henry King, Adrian Rollini, Ben Marden, Carl Hoff, CBS House Orchestra, Manhattan Beach House Orchestra

Sunny Skylar (October 11, 1913 – February 2, 2009) was an American music composer, singer, lyricist, and music publisher, often recognized as one of the most prominent songwriters of the Tin Pan Alley era. Sunny Skylar had written over 300 songs according to ASCAP, and was inducted into the Songwriter's Hall of Fame in 2010.

His compositions have been performed and recorded by countless timeless acts such as Frank Sinatra, Dean Martin, Ella Fitzgerald, Nat King Cole, The Beatles, Tony Bennett, Louis Armstrong, Bing Crosby, and Benny Goodman. He may be best remembered for adapting English lyrics to popular songs like "Bésame Mucho" and "Amor", as well as his original compositions such as "Don't Wait Too Long", "Gotta Be This or That", "Waitin' For The Train to Come In", "You're Breaking My Heart", "Hair of Gold, Eyes of Blue", "A Little Bit South of North Carolina", and many more. Included in the Great American Songbook and The Real Book, many of Sunny Skylar's songs have remained jazz standards.

== Early life ==
Sunny Skylar was born Selig Sidney Shaftel in Brooklyn, New York on October 11, 1913. His father, Jack, was born in Russia and immigrated to the United States around the age of 10, while his mother, Sarah, was born in the state of New York, both in the 1880s. Jack and Sarah Shaftel occasionally performed a song and dance act in vaudeville shows. Sunny was one of four children and grew up with his family in Brooklyn, New York.

== Singing career ==
Sunny Skylar began his professional singing career at the age of 18, with the Harold Stern band at a resort known as "Manhattan Beach" in 1932, after his friends jokingly pushed him on the bandstand and encouraged him to sing. After numerous requests and encores, the crowd and band enjoyed his singing enough to hire Skylar that day as the new resident vocalist for at Manhattan Beach. Classified as a baritone, by 1938, he was the featured singer in the orchestras of Vincent Lopez and Paul Whiteman, and soon appeared with a number of big bands, including those led by Ben Bernie, Jack Denny, Freddie Perren, Abe Lyman, George Hall, Ben Marden, Henry "Hank" Sylvern, Carl Hoff, Henry King, Adrian Rollini, and the CBS House Orchestra, under the name Sonny Schuyler (pronounced: "Skylar"). It was band leader, Vincent Lopez, who changed the singer's professional name from Sonny Schuyler to Sunny Skylar, based in his strong belief in numerology in 1940. Lopez believed that the reduced number of letters was an omen of good fortune. Only a few months later, the newly named, Sunny Skylar, had his first chart-topping hit song.

In 1942, after entertaining for five years with Vincent Lopez and His Hotel Taft Orchestra, Skylar embarked on a singing career in entertainment that was not tied to just one orchestra or bandleader. Instead, he entertained as a vocalist, mostly performing his own popular tunes as a headliner at music venues in New York City, such as the Latin Quarter, Montreal, El Morocco, and La Martinique. With a growing demand for top performers in the newly developing Las Vegas Strip, Skylar secured residencies at hotels such as The Flamingo, El Rancho, El Cortez, and The Dunes, among others. In August 1949, Sunny Skylar was a featured entertainer on The Ed Sullivan Show, performing a four-minute medley of some of his biggest songs on live television. He continued to perform in nightclubs and theaters until 1952, when he retired from singing, at the end of the big band era.

== Songwriting career ==
Though Skylar had many of his singing performances with big bands pressed onto records throughout his career, it was his songwriting that would become his legacy. Skylar began as a songwriter in New York City's Tin Pan Alley, which is said to be the birthplace of pop music in the United States. Like many up-and-coming songwriters of the time, he was writing and refining songs for other composers, oftentimes not receiving credit for his work until he could prove himself as a consistent hit songwriter.

One of his first notable hit songs, "Don't Cry", was performed by Skylar with Vincent Lopez & His Suave String Orchestra for Soundies on June 31, 1940, displayed on the Mills Panoram Jukebox. His next hit song also came about in 1940, when during a live performance, Sunny observed Vincent Lopez overworking his orchestra, and spontaneously created the humorous lyrics which became known as "Fifteen Minute Intermission". He graduated to even greater popularity with his song "Just A Little Bit South of North Carolina" in 1941. His next two hits, "Move It Over" and "Paper Troopers", were written as wartime anthems for the United States Armed Forces during World War II, both released in 1943.

One of Sunny Skylar's most well-known song credits is "Bésame Mucho", which was originally written by the famed Mexican songwriter Consuelo Velázquez. Skylar discovered the song while at the La Martinique club in New York City. He noticed that people kept coming up to the bandleader requesting the same song every few minutes. He became really fond of the song and wrote his version of English lyrics to the melody. A common practice during the Big band era was to adapt lyrics for audiences around the world. The English version of "Bésame Mucho" was first released in 1944 by Jimmy Dorsey & His Orchestra. The song became and instant hit and has been covered countless times since its release. "Bésame Mucho" has been said to be one of the most popular songs of the 20th century. In 1999, it was recognized as the most recorded and covered song in of all time. "Bésame Mucho" was even the song recorded by The Beatles on their demo that they used for a chance at a record deal with Decca Records on January 1, 1962. Compared to the original Spanish lyrics by Velázquez published in 1941, Skylar's 1944 English version has been criticized for its overly romantic theme, as it is not a true Spanish to English translation. Skylar continued adapting English lyrics to songs and made two more hits, "Amor" (originally by Gabriel Ruiz) and "Be Mine Tonight (Noche De Ronda)" through the end of the 1940s.

Many hit songs followed such as "Gotta Be This or That", "You'll Always Be The One I Love", "And So To Sleep Again", "Atlanta, G.A.", "Waitin' For The Train To Come In", "Cry, Cry, Cry", "Hair of Gold, Eyes of Blue", "It Must Be Jelly ('Cause Jam Don't Shake like That)", "It's All Over Now", "Louisville, K.Y.", "Nola", "Put That Ring on My Finger", "Song of New Orleans", and "Whatta Ya Gonna Do". Skylar's song "You're Breaking My Heart", began as Ruggero Leoncavallo's 1904 Italian opera tune, "Mattinata", which Skylar wrote lyrics and a melody to, and singer Vic Damone made popular in 1949. Sunny Skylar has had hundreds of songs published through ASCAP and BMI, with the official ASCAP database showing over 300 song credits to his name.

Popular music shifted from the Big band era to rock and roll in the 1950s, but Skylar continued to have a few hits until 1965, making him one of only a few songwriters (including Sammy Cahn and Johnny Mercer) to transition from the era of Tin Pan Alley songwriting to the newer sounds of the 1950s and 1960s. "Love Me With All Your Heart", the song originally titled, "Cuando Calienta El Sol", was released in 1964 by The Ray Charles Singers, and would prove to be one their biggest selling singles. His song "Don't Wait Too Long" on the Frank Sinatra album, September of My Years, was released in 1965. Numerous songs credit his older brother, Arthur ("Artie") Shaftel as a co-songwriter with Skylar. Many of Skylar's compositions have been included in The Real Book by Hal Leonard Music Publishing, which continues to be a relevant collection of songs, which jazz musician learn from. Some of these titles include "Bésame Mucho", "Don't Wait Too Long", "Gotta Be This or That", "Love Me With All Your Heart", "Be Mine Tonight (Noche De Ronda)", and "Amor".

== Music publishing ==
With a talent for recognizing hit songs, Sunny Skylar, began working as a music publisher at Peer-Southern Music following his singing career. Peer-Southern Music was the company Skylar used most often to publish his own songs. In 1965, he moved to São Paulo, Brazil and began working as a consultant for foreign songs. He relocated their Hollywood, California branch and worked closely with Roy Kohn and Bobby Mellin. Peer-Southern Music is known to be the largest independent music publisher in the world.

== Death ==
Sunny Skylar died at the age of 95 on February 2, 2009, in Las Vegas, Nevada.

== Achievements ==
- Featured in Billboard 152 times from January 1942 until April 2010 with top charting songs, advertisements, musical achievements, quotes, career updates, as well as song, album, and live performance reviews.
- Featured in Time (1943) and The New York Times Magazine (1944).
- Broke the Tin Pan Alley record of six number-one songs on the popular music charts at the same time.
- Inducted into the Songwriter's Hall of Fame (2010).
- Songwriting credit of over 300 songs according to ASCAP.

== Popular compositions ==
Among the songs he wrote (either music and/or lyrics) are:

- "A Little Golden Cross" recorded by Vaughn Monroe
- "Amor" (English lyrics) recorded by Dean Martin, Bing Crosby, Lawrence Welk, and The Four Aces
- "And So to Sleep Again" recorded by Patti Page
- "Are These Really Mine?" recorded by Gene Krupa
- "Ask Me" recorded by Nat King Cole
- "Atlanta, G.A." recorded by Woody Herman and Sammy Kaye
- "Be Mine Tonight (Noche De Ronda)" (English lyrics) recorded by Doris Day and Andy Williams
- "Bésame Mucho" (English lyrics) recorded by The Beatles, Dean Martin, Nat King Cole, Jimmy Dorsey, Chris Isaak, and The Ventures
- "Capri In May" recorded by Tony Bennett
- "Cry, Cry, Cry" recorded by Kitty Kallen and Peggy Lee
- "Don’t Cry" recorded by Sunny Skylar
- "Don't Wait Too Long" recorded by Frank Sinatra and Tony Bennett
- "Fifteen Minute Intermission" recorded by Sunny Skylar
- "Gotta Be This or That" recorded by Ella Fitzgerald, Frank Sinatra, Judy Garland, Benny Goodman, Jimmy Dorsey, and Ames Brothers
- "Hair of Gold, Eyes of Blue" recorded by Doris Day, Gordon MacRae, and Ronnie Ronalde
- "I Miss Your Kiss" recorded by Vaughn Monroe
- "I'd Be Lost Without You" recorded by Betty Jane Rhodes, Guy Lombardo, and Marjorie Hughes
- "I'm-a Rollin'" recorded by Roy Rodgers
- "I've Got Bells on My Heart" recorded by Don Cornell
- "If You Loved Me (Soul Coaxing)" recorded by Peggy March
- "It All Came True" recorded by Frank Sinatra
- "It Must Be Jelly ('Cause Jam Don't Shake like That)" recorded by Glenn Miller
- "It's All Over Now" recorded by Peggy Lee
- "Just a Little Bit South of North Carolina" recorded by Dean Martin and Anita O'Day
- "Long Time No See Baby"
- "Louisville, K.Y." recorded by Ella Fitzgerald
- "Love Is So Terrific" recorded by Vic Damone, Bing Crosby, Eileen and The Satisfiers
- "Love Me with All Your Heart" recorded by The Ray Charles Singers
- "Move It Over"
- "Nola" recorded by Les Paul and Billy Williams
- "Put That Ring on My Finger" recorded by Woody Herman, The Andrews Sisters, and Dolly Dawn
- "Pussy Cat" recorded by Ames Brothers
- "Ridin' On The Gravy Train" recorded by Nat King Cole and Jo Stafford
- "Ruby-Duby-Du" recorded by Joanie Sommers
- "Song of New Orleans" recorded by Tony Martin
- "Too Soon" recorded by Nat King Cole
- "Waitin' For The Train To Come In" recorded by Peggy Lee, Kitty Kallen, and Perry Como
- "Watching The World Go By" recorded by Dean Martin
- "Whatta Ya Gonna Do" recorded by Louis Armstrong
- "Wherever There's Me recorded by There's You" – Betty Hutton and Peggy Lee
- "You" recorded by Sammy Kaye
- "You'll Always Be The One I Love" recorded by Frank Sinatra, Dean Martin, and Dinah Shore
- "You're Breaking My Heart" recorded by Frank Sinatra, Dean Martin, Vic Damone, and Buddy Clark

== Music in movies ==
- Valentine's Day (2010) featuring "Amor"
- The Quiet American (2002) featuring "Bésame Mucho"
- Lolita (1997) featuring "Amor"
- Bugsy (1991) featuring "Waitin' For The Train to Come In"
- The Naked Gun 2 1/2: The Smell of Fear (1991) featuring "Bésame Mucho"
- Avalon (1990) featuring "Bésame Mucho"
- Moon over Parador (1988) featuring "Bésame Mucho"
- Frances (1982) featuring "Love Is So Terrific"
- Massacre Mafia Style (1974) featuring "Open Your Heart"
- Ardent Summer (1973) featuring "Bésame Mucho"
- The Seduction of Mimi (1972) featuring "La Cumparsita [English Lyrics]"
- Home Before Dark (1958) featuring "Gotta Be This or That"
- No Time For Sergeants (1958) featuring "Gotta Be This or That"
- The Proud and Profane (1956) featuring "Amor"
- Flyg-Bom (1952) featuring "Bundle of Love"
- Clash by Night (1952) featuring "Don't Cry"
- Havana Rose (1951) featuring "Be Mine Tonight (Noche De Ronda)"
- The Glass Menagerie (1950) featuring "Gotta Be This or That"
- Singing Guns (1950) featuring "Mexicali Trail"
- Maytime in Mayfair (1949) featuring "Amor"
- Riders of the Whistling Pines (1949) featuring "Hair of Gold, Eyes of Blue"
- Fighter Squadron (1948) featuring "Gotta Be This or That"
- Swingin' Spurs (1948) featuring "Hair of Gold, Eyes of Blue"
- The Voice of The Turtle (1947) featuring "Gotta Be This or That"
- Carnival in Costa Rica (1947) featuring "Costa Rica"
- That Way with Women (1947) featuring "Gotta Be This or That"
- The Man I Love (1947) featuring "Gotta Be This or That"
- Breakfast in Hollywood (1946) featuring "Amor"
- Lights of Old Santa Fe (1944) featuring "Amor"
- Swing in the Saddle (1944) featuring "Amor"
- Broadway Rhythm (1944) featuring "Amor"
- Swing Fever (1943) featuring "Sh-! Don't Make a Sound"

== Music in television ==
- Lovecraft Country (2020) featuring "Bésame Mucho"
- Manhattan (2014) featuring "Bésame Mucho"
- The War (2007) featuring "Waitin' For The Train to Come In"
- Cold Case (2004–2005) featuring "Gotta Be This or That" and "Waitin' For The Train to Come In"
- The Beatles Anthology (1995–1996)
- Bandstand (1966) featuring "Love Me With All Your Heart"
- Shindig! (1965) featuring "Hidden Island"
- Hawaiian Eye (1962) featuring "I'd Be Lost Without You"
- Glenn Miller Time (1961) featuring " It Must Be Jelly ('Cause Jam Don't Shake Like That)"
- The Adventures of Rin-Tin-Tin (1956) featuring "Yo-O Rinty"
- The Milton Berle Show (1955) "You're Breaking My Heart"
- Looney Tunes (1946–1954) featuring "Gotta Be This or That", "All The Time", and "I'd Be Lost Without You"
- The Ed Sullivan Show (1949) featuring "Just a Little Bit South of North Carolina", "Amor", "Bésame Mucho", "Waitin' For The Train to Come In", "Love Is So Terrific", "Hair of Gold, Eyes of Blue", and "You're Breaking My Heart"
- Soundies (1940) featuring "Don't Cry" and "Overnight"

== Music for radio ==
- Composed the music to "Hello, Again", the theme song that New York City radio presenter Herb Oscar Anderson sang everyday to start his show. Anderson composed the lyrics.
- Hosted a weekly Sunday radio show during the 1940s on New York's WKBB, singing popular song requests. A songbook of sheet music was published with all of Skylar's favorite songs from this time period, titled Sunny Skylar's Radio Song Favorites.
