= K. T. Oslin discography =

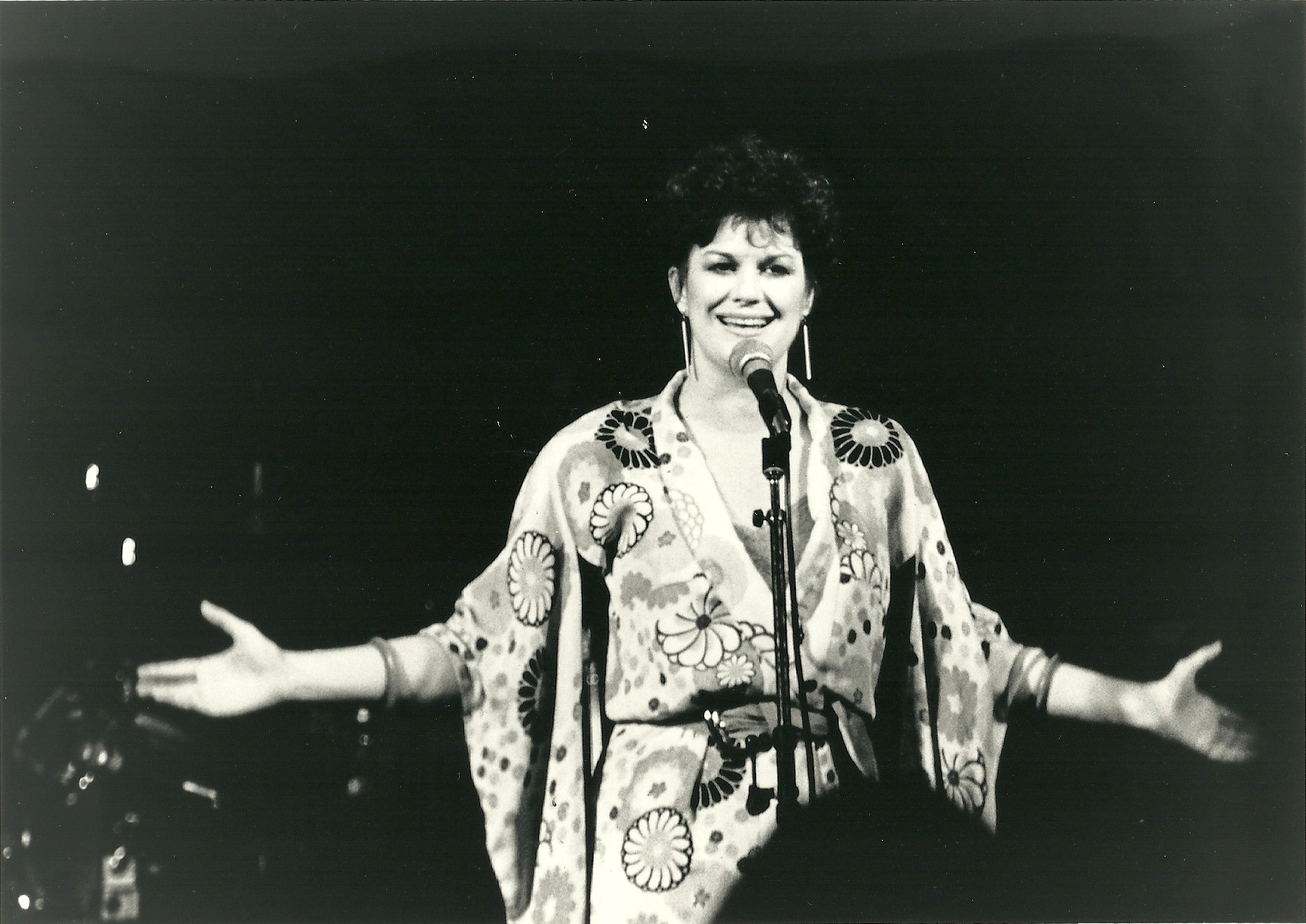
- Studio albums: 6
- Compilation albums: 6
- Singles: 25
- Video albums: 1
- Music videos: 7
- Other album appearances: 6

American country music artist K. T. Oslin released six studio albums, six compilation albums, one video album, seven music videos, 25 singles and six album appearances. Oslin signed a recording contract with Elektra Records in 1981. Both singles failed to become major hits. She then signed with RCA Records in 1987 and released the single "80's Ladies." The song became a top ten country hit, reaching number seven on the Billboard Hot Country Songs chart in July 1987. Oslin's corresponding debut studio album of the same name reached number one on the Billboard Top Country Albums chart and spent 148 weeks on the list. It would also be her highest-charting album on the Billboard 200, peaking at number 68. The album would sell one million copies and spawn the number one hits "Do Ya" and "I'll Always Come Back." Oslin's second album, This Woman was released in 1988 and was her second record to certify platinum in sales. It was her second-highest charting album on the country chart, reaching number two in 1989. Its second single, "Hold Me," topped the country songs chart in January 1989. The album also spawned the top ten hits "Hey Bobby" and the title track.

In 1990, Love in a Small Town became Oslin's third studio release. It reached number five on the country albums list and spent 71 weeks charting. It spawned Oslin's third number one hit, "Come Next Monday." Her career slowed down following the album, yet she did release 1993's Greatest Hits: Songs from an Aging Sex Bomb. In 1996, she returned with a new studio record titled "My Roots Are Showing...". It reached a lower-end position on the Top Country Albums chart, peaking at number 45 after six weeks. The album spawned two singles, including the charting single "Silver Tongue and Goldplated Lies." In 2001, Live Close By, Visit Often became her fifth studio recording. Its cover of "Come on-a My House," was her first (and only) single to chart on the Billboard Hot Dance Club Songs list. In 2015, Oslin released her final studio effort, Simply. In December 2020, Oslin died after several years battling Parkinson's disease.

== Albums ==
=== Studio albums ===
List of albums, with selected chart positions and certifications, showing other relevant details
Title	Album details	Peak chart positions				Certifications
Title	Album details	US	US Cou.	CAN Cou.	UK Cou.	Certifications
80's Ladies	Released: June 30, 1987; Label: RCA; Formats: LP, cassette, CD	68	1	—	—	CAN: Gold; US: Platinum
This Woman	Released: August 30, 1988; Label: RCA; Formats: LP, cassette, CD	75	2	4	—	CAN: Gold; US: Platinum
Love in a Small Town	Released: November 6, 1990; Label: RCA; Formats: LP, cassette, CD	76	5	—	19	US: Gold
"My Roots Are Showing..."	Released: October 1, 1996; Label: BNA; Formats: Cassette, CD	—	45	—	—	
Live Close By, Visit Often	Released: June 19, 2001; Label: BNA; Formats: CD	—	35	—	—	
Simply	Released: June 2, 2015; Label: Red River; Formats: CD, music download	—	—	—	—	
"—" denotes a recording that did not chart or was not released in that territory.

=== Compilation albums ===
List of albums, with selected chart positions, showing other relevant details
Title	Album details	Peak chart positions		
Title	Album details	US	US Cou.	CAN Cou.
Greatest Hits: Songs from an Aging Sex Bomb	Released: April 27, 1993; Label: RCA; Formats: Cassette, CD	126	31	27
New Way Home	Released: 1993; Label: RCA; Formats: Cassette, CD	—	—	—
Super Hits	Released: June 3, 1997; Label: RCA; Formats: Cassette, CD	—	—	—
At Her Best	Released: September 8, 1998; Label: BNA; Formats: Cassette, CD	—	—	—
RCA Country Legends	Released: September 10, 2002; Label: RCA; Formats: CD	—	—	—
All-American Country	Released: April 1, 2004; Label: Sony BMG; Formats: CD	—	—	—
"—" denotes a recording that did not chart or was not released in that territory.

== Singles ==
List of singles, with selected chart positions, showing other relevant details
Title	Year	Peak chart positions			Album
Title	Year	US Cou.	US Dan.	CAN Cou.	Album
"Sweet Thang" (Note: Oslin was credited on "Sweet Thang" as "Frankie & Johnny".)	1967	—	—	—	non-album singles
"Clean Your Own Tables" (Note: Oslin was credited in the single's release under the name "Kay T. Oslin.")	1981	72	—	—	non-album singles
"Younger Men" (Note: Oslin was credited in the single's release under the name "Kay T. Oslin.")	1982	—	—	—	non-album singles
"Wall of Tears"	1987	40	—	—	80's Ladies
"80's Ladies"	1987	7	—	4	80's Ladies
"Do Ya'"	1987	1	—	3	80's Ladies
"I'll Always Come Back"	1987	1	—	1	80's Ladies
"Younger Men" (re-recording) (Note: Single was released in the UK.)	1988	—	—	—	80's Ladies
"Money"	1988	13	—	11	This Woman
"Hold Me"	1988	1	—	1	This Woman
"Hey Bobby"	1989	2	—	1	This Woman
"This Woman"	1989	5	—	2	This Woman
"Didn't Expect It to Go Down This Way"	1989	23	—	27	This Woman
"Two Hearts"	1990	73	—	50	Love in a Small Town
"Come Next Monday"	1990	1	—	1	Love in a Small Town
"Mary and Willie"	1991	28	—	20	Love in a Small Town
"You Call Everybody Darling"	1991	69	—	72	Love in a Small Town
"Cornell Crawford"	1991	63	—	—	Love in a Small Town
"A New Way Home"	1993	64	—	78	Greatest Hits: Songs from an Aging Sex Bomb
"Feeding a Hungry Heart"	1994	—	—	—	Greatest Hits: Songs from an Aging Sex Bomb
"Silver Tongue and Goldplated Lies"	1996	64	—	86	"My Roots Are Showing..."
"Live Close By, Visit Often"	2001	53	—	—	Live Close By, Visit Often
"Come on-a My House"	2001	—	40	—	Live Close By, Visit Often
"Drivin', Cryin', Missin' You"	2001	—	—	—	Live Close By, Visit Often
"—" denotes a recording that did not chart or was not released in that territory.

== Videography ==
=== Video albums ===
List of albums, showing certifications and other relevant details
Title	Album details	Certifications
Love in a Small Town	Released: July 1, 1991; Label: RCA; Formats: VHS	US: Gold

=== Music videos ===
List of music videos, showing year released and director
Title	Year	Director(s)	Ref.
"80's Ladies"	1987	Jack Cole; John Lloyd Miller	
"I'll Always Come Back"	1988	Jack Cole; John Lloyd Miller	
"Hold Me"	1988	Jack Cole	
"Didn't Expect It to Go Down This Way"	1989	Bill Pope	
"Come Next Monday"	1990	Jack Cole	
"Mary and Willie"	1991	Jack Cole	
"Silver Tongue and Goldplated Lies"	1996	Allen Coulter	

== Other album appearances ==
List of non-single guest appearances, with other performing artists, showing year released and album name
Title	Year	Other artist(s)	Album	Ref.
"Blue Christmas"	1988	—N/a	Mistletoe and Memories	
"Baby, It's Cold Outside"	1990	Barry Manilow	Because It's Christmas	
"Tumbling Tumbleweeds"	1991	Roy Rogers; Restless Heart	Roy Rogers Tribute	
"80's Ladies" (Live at the 30th Annual Grammy Awards)	1994	—N/a	Grammy's Greatest Country Moments, Volume II	
"I Don't Remember Your Name (But I Remember You)"	1994	—N/a	The Thing Called Love (soundtrack)	
"Where Is a Woman to Go"	1995	Mary Chapin Carpenter; Dusty Springfield	A Very Fine Love	
"Your Good Girl's Gonna Go Bad"	1998	—N/a	Tammy Wynette Remembered	
