= Greatest Hits: Songs from an Aging Sex Bomb =

Greatest hits album by K. T. Oslin
- Released: April 27, 1993
- Genre: Country
- Length: 46:50
- Label: RCA Nashville
- Producer: Glen Ballard; Jim Cotton; Joe Scaife; Harold Shedd

K. T. Oslin chronology
Love in a Small Town (1991)	Greatest Hits: Songs from an Aging Sex Bomb (1993)	"My Roots Are Showing..." (1996)

Professional ratings
Review scores
Source	Rating
Allmusic	4/5 stars

Greatest Hits: Songs from an Aging Sex Bomb is a compilation album by American country music artist K. T. Oslin, released by RCA Nashville in 1993. "A New Way Home", a re-recording of a track from her Love in a Small Town album, and "Feeding a Hungry Heart" were the only singles released from the project. The album also includes a re-recording of Oslin's 1988 hit "Hold Me". The album reached number 31 on the Billboard Top Country Albums chart.

== Track listing ==
No.	Title	Writer(s)	Producer(s)	Length
1.	"New Way Home" (re-recording)	Joe Miller, K. T. Oslin	Glen Ballard	3:49
2.	"Hold Me" (re-recording)	Oslin	Ballard	5:01
3.	"Feeding a Hungry Heart" (new song)	Randy Goodrum, Oslin	Ballard	3:53
4.	"80's Ladies"	Oslin	Harold Shedd	4:12
5.	"Do Ya'"	Oslin	Shedd	4:03
6.	"Come Next Monday"	Charlie Black, Rory Bourke, Oslin	Jim Cotton, Joe Scaife	3:49
7.	"You Can't Do That" (new song)	Ballard, Will Jennings, Oslin	Ballard	3:47
8.	"I'll Always Come Back"	Oslin	Shedd	4:08
9.	"Hey Bobby"	Oslin	Shedd	4:25
10.	"This Woman"	Oslin	Shedd	4:53
11.	"Get Back in the Saddle" (new song)	Walt Aldridge, James Hooker	Ballard	4:51

== Personnel (tracks 1, 2, 3, 7, 11) ==
Adapted from liner notes.

- Maxi Anderson - background vocals
- Glen Ballard - Fender Rhodes (track 1), percussion (track 2), piano (track 7), programming (tracks 3, 11), rhythm arrangements, synthesizer
- Paulinho Da Costa - percussion (track 11)
- Brandon Fields - saxophone solo (track 3)
- Randy Goodrum - synthesizer (track 3)
- Gary Grant - trumpet (track 7)
- Owen Hale - drums (track 3)
- Jerry Hey - horn arrangements, trumpet (track 7)
- Dan Higgins - saxophone (track 7)
- Kim Hutchcraft - saxophone (track 7)
- Jimmy Johnson - bass guitar
- Randy Kerber - Fender Rhodes (tracks 3, 7, 11), piano (tracks 1, 11), synthesizer (track 11)
- Michael Landau - guitar
- Edie Lehmann - background vocals
- Arnold McCuller - background vocals
- Tommy Morgan - harmonica (track 11)
- K.T. Oslin - lead vocals, background vocals
- John "J.R." Robinson - drums
- Benmont Tench - Hammond B-3 organ

== Chart performance ==
Chart (1993)	Peak position
U.S. Billboard Top Country Albums	31
U.S. Billboard 200	126
Canadian RPM Country Albums	27
