= Love in a Small Town (video) =

Video by K. T. Oslin
- Released: July 1, 1991
- Genre: Country; country pop
- Length: 23:45
- Label: RCA
- Producer: Mark Pleasant

K. T. Oslin chronology
Love in a Small Town (1990)	Love in a Small Town (1991)	Greatest Hits: Songs from an Aging Sex Bomb (1993)

Love in a Small Town is a video album by American country singer–songwriter K. T. Oslin. It was released on July 1, 1991, by RCA Records and contained five tracks. The project was named for Oslin's 1990 studio album of the same name. It contained all of her music videos released up to that point and would later be certified gold in sales.

== Background and release ==
By 1991, K. T. Oslin had released three studio albums and had four number hit singles on the Billboard country songs chart. Her most recent album, Love in a Small Town, produced her most recent hit single, "Come Next Monday." The success of the song and its corresponding music video prompted Oslin's label to release a video long form album of the same name. The video project contained a total five music videos Oslin had previously released. Although released, all five of the video had not been compiled onto one project. Included were the videos for her hits "80's Ladies," "I'll Always Come Back," "Hold Me" and "Didn't Expect It to Go Down This Way" and "Come Next Monday." The project did not contain a producer, however its credits include a compilation director: Mark Pleasant.

Love in a Small Town was released on RCA Records on July 1, 1991. The album was issued as a VHS tape. It is Oslin's only video album project to date. The album did not reach any major chart positions, notably the Billboard Top Country Albums chart, where Oslin's previous album releases had placed. Following its release, Love in a Small Town sold 500,000 copies in the United States, which helped certify gold in sales from the Recording Industry Association of America.

== Track listing ==
Love in a Small Town (1991)
No.	Title	Length
1.	"80's Ladies"	4:46
2.	"I'll Always Come Back"	4:44
3.	"Hold Me"	4:22
4.	"Didn't Expect It to Go Down This Way"	3:46
5.	"Come Next Monday"	4:24
Total length:		23:45

== Personnel ==
All credits are adapted from the liner notes of Love in a Small Town.

Musical and technical personnel

- Marc Ball – director
- Jack Cole – director
- Gary Conn, Jr. – video graphics
- Elite Post of Nashville – post production
- Eddie Hales – editor
- John Lloyd Miller – director
- K. T. Oslin – lead vocals
- Mark Pleasant – video compilation director
- Harold Shedd – music producer
- Small Wonder Studio – production

== Certifications ==
Region	Certification	Certified units/sales
United States (RIAA)	Gold	50,000^{^}
^{^} Shipments figures based on certification alone.

== Release history ==
Region	Date	Format	Label	Ref.
United States	July 1, 1991	VHS	RCA Records	
