= 24th Academy of Country Music Awards =

US music awards ceremony in 1989

- Date: April 10, 1989
- Location: Disney Studios, Burbank, California
- Hosted by: Patrick Duffy; George Strait; K.T. Oslin

Highlights
- Most wins: K.T. Oslin; Hank Williams Jr. Kathy Mattea (2 each)
- Most nominations: K.T. Oslin (5)

Television/radio coverage
- Network: NBC

The 24th Academy of Country Music Awards ceremony was held on April 10, 1989, at Disney Studios, Burbank, California. It was hosted by Patrick Duffy, K.T. Oslin, and George Strait.

== Winners and nominees ==
Winners are shown in bold.

Entertainer of the Year	Album of the Year
**Hank Williams Jr.**; Alabama; The Judds; George Strait; Randy Travis	**This Woman — K.T. Oslin**; Buenas Noches from a Lonely Room — Dwight Yoakam; Chiseled in Stone — Vern Gosdin; If You Ain't Lovin' You Ain't Livin' — George Strait; Loving Proof — Ricky Van Shelton
Top Female Vocalist of the Year	Top Male Vocalist of the Year
**K.T. Oslin**; Rosanne Cash; Kathy Mattea; Reba McEntire; Tanya Tucker	**George Strait**; Ricky Van Shelton; Randy Travis; Hank Williams Jr.; Dwight Yoakam
Top Vocal Group of the Year	Top Vocal Duo of the Year
**Highway 101**; Alabama; Desert Rose Band; Oak Ridge Boys; Restless Heart	**The Judds**; The Bellamy Brothers; Rodney Crowell and Rosanne Cash; Sweethearts of the Rodeo; Dwight Yoakam and Buck Owens
Single Record of the Year	Song of the Year
**"Eighteen Wheels and a Dozen Roses"** — **Kathy Mattea**; "Don't Close Your Eyes" — Keith Whitley; "I Told You So" - Randy Travis; "I'll Always Come Back" — K.T. Oslin; "I'll Leave This World Loving You" — Ricky Van Shelton; "Strong Enough to Bend" — Tanya Tucker	**"Eighteen Wheels and a Dozen Roses"** — **Gene Nelson, Paul Nelson**; "Don't Close Your Eyes" — Bob McDill; "I Know How He Feels" — Rick Bowles, Will Robinson; "Set 'Em Up Joe" — Dean Dillon, Hank Cochran, Buddy Cannon, Vern Gosdin; "Strong Enough to Bend" — Beth Nielsen Chapman, Don Schlitz
Top New Male Vocalist	Top New Female Vocalist
**Rodney Crowell**; J. C. Crowley; Skip Ewing; David Lynn Jones; Paul Overstreet	**Suzy Bogguss**; Vicki Bird; Cee Cee Chapman; Linda Davis; Donna Meade
Video of the Year
**"Young Country"** — **Hank Williams Jr.**; "Hold Me" — K.T. Oslin; "I'll Always Come Back" — K.T. Oslin; "The Old Man No One Loves" — George Jones; "Sunday Kind of Love" — Reba McEntire
Pioneer Award
**Buck Owens**
Artist of the Decade Award
**Alabama**

== Performers ==
Performer(s)	Song(s)
Randy Travis	"Is It Still Over?"
Skip Ewing; Vicki Bird	New Artist Medley #1 "I Don't Have Far to Fall" "Mem'ries"
The Judds	"Let Me Tell You About Love"
J. C. Crowley; Donna Meade	New Artist Medley #2 "Paint the Town and Hang the Moon Tonight" "Love's Last Stand"
Reba McEntire	"Cathy's Clown"
Paul Overstreet; Linda Davis	New Artist Medley #3 "Sowin' Love" "Weak Nights"
Hank Williams; Hank Williams Jr.	"There's a Tear in My Beer"
K.T. Oslin	"Hey Bobby"
David Lynn Jones; Cee Cee Chapman	New Artist Medley #4 "Bonnie Jean (Little Sister)" "Frontier Justice"
George Strait	"What's Going On in Your World"
Willie Nelson	"Better Part Over"
Suzy Bogguss; Rodney Crowell	New Artist Medley #5 "Somewhere Between" "After All This Time"
Highway 101	"Setting Me Up"

== Presenters ==
Presenter(s)	Notes
George Peppard; Patty Loveless; Buck Owens	Top Vocal Group of the Year
Mary Frann; The Bellamy Brothers	Album of the Year
Juice Newton; The Oak Ridge Boys	Video of the Year
Carl Perkins; Charlie Daniels	Presented Artist of the Decade Award to Alabama
Eddie Rabbitt; Bruce Jenner	Top Female Vocalist of the Year
Eddy Raven; Lisa Hartman Black; Keith Whitley	Top Vocal Duo of the Year
Don Williams; Morgan Brittany; Moe Bandy	Single Record of the Year
Janie Fricke; Ronnie Milsap; Tammy Wynette	Song of the Year
Roger Miller; Dwight Yoakam	Presented Pioneer Award to Buck Owens
Leeza Gibbons; Kathy Mattea	Top Male Vocalist of the Year
Restless Heart; Lacy J. Dalton	Top New Female Vocalist; Top New Male Vocalist
Dennis Weaver; Valerie Harper	Entertainer of the Year
