= 1988 Country Music Association Awards =

Annual US music awards ceremony

- Date: October 10, 1988
- Location: Grand Ole Opry House, Nashville, Tennessee
- Hosted by: Dolly Parton
- Most wins: K.T. Oslin; Hank Williams, Jr. (2 each)
- Most nominations: K.T. Oslin (5)

Television/radio coverage
- Network: CBS

The 1988 Country Music Association Awards, 22nd Ceremony, was held on October 10, 1988, at the Grand Ole Opry House, Nashville, Tennessee, and was hosted by CMA Award Winner Dolly Parton.

== Winners and nominees ==
Winner are in Bold.

Entertainer of the Year	Album of the Year
**Hank Williams, Jr.**; The Judds; Reba McEntire; Randy Travis; George Strait	**Born to Boogie — Hank Williams, Jr.**; Chiseled in Stone — Vern Gosdin; Diamonds and Dirt — Rodney Crowell; If You Ain't Lovin' You Ain't Livin' — George Strait; Untasted Honey — Kathy Mattea
Male Vocalist of the Year	Female Vocalist of the Year
**Randy Travis**; Vern Gosdin; George Strait; Ricky Van Shelton; Hank Williams Jr.	**K. T. Oslin**; Rosanne Cash; Kathy Mattea; Reba McEntire; Tanya Tucker
Vocal Group of the Year	Vocal Duo of the Year
**Highway 101**; Alabama; Forester Sisters; Nitty Gritty Dirt Band; Restless Heart	**The Judds**; Bellamy Brothers; Foster & Lloyd; The O'Kanes; Sweetheart of the Rodeo
Single of the Year	Song of the Year
**"Eighteen Wheels And A Dozen Roses" — Kathy Mattea**; "Do Ya" — K. T. Oslin; "I Told You So" — Randy Travis; "Somebody Lied" — Ricky Van Shelton; "Tennessee Flat Top Box" — Rosanne Cash	**"80's Ladies" — K.T. Oslin**; "Do Ya" — K. T. Oslin; "Eighteen Wheels And A Dozen Roses" — Gene Nelson and Paul Nelson; "I Told You So" — Randy Travis; "Life Turned Her That Way" — Harlan Howard
Horizon Award	Musician of the Year
**Ricky Van Shelton**; Highway 101; K.T. Oslin; Patty Loveless; Sweetheart of the Rodeo	**Chet Atkins**; David Briggs; Jerry Douglas; Johnny Gimble; Mark O'Connor
Vocal Event of the Year
**TRIO — Dolly Parton, Linda Ronstadt, and Emmylou Harris**; Dwight Yoakam and Buck Owens; Emmylou Harris and Earl Thomas Conley; Rodney Crowell and Rosanne Cash; Tanya Tucker, Paul Davis and Paul Overstreet

== Hall of Fame ==
Country Music Hall of Fame Inductees
- Loretta Lynn
- Roy Rogers
