= This Woman =

This Woman may refer to:

- This Woman (LeAnn Rimes album), 2005
- This Woman (K. T. Oslin album), 1988
- "This Woman" (K. T. Oslin song), 1989
- "This Woman" (Kenny Rogers song), 1983
- This Woman (film), a 1924 American film
