= "My Roots Are Showing..." =

Studio album by K. T. Oslin
- Released: October 1, 1996
- Studio: Woodland Studios
- Genre: Country; contemporary country
- Length: 36:38
- Label: BNA
- Producer: K. T. Oslin; Rick Will

K. T. Oslin chronology
Greatest Hits: Songs from an Aging Sex Bomb (1993)	"My Roots Are Showing..." (1996)	Live Close By, Visit Often (2001)

Singles from "My Roots Are Showing..."
- 1. "Silver Tongue and Goldplated Lies" Released: July 1996

"My Roots Are Showing..." is the fourth studio album by American country singer–songwriter K. T. Oslin. It was released on October 1, 1996, via BNA Records and contained ten tracks. The album was co-produced by Oslin and Rick Will. The project contained cover versions of songs first made famous in the country and pop fields. It was Oslin's first studio album release in six years after experiencing personal setbacks. "My Roots Are Showing..." reached peak positions on the country albums chart following its release. It would also spawn two singles issued to country radio in 1996.

== Background ==
K. T. Oslin had several years of country music success in the late 1980s with hits like "80's Ladies," "Hold Me" and "This Woman." Then, in the early 1990s she took a hiatus from her music career and focused on other projects such as acting. Oslin developed a heart condition during her time off, which caused her to receive Quadruple bypass surgery in 1995. She later made a full recovery.

Oslin was also contemplating a musical comeback. RCA Records executive Joe Galante had offered her a position in the A&R department, but she ultimately declined. Instead, Oslin told Galante about the possibility of recording a dance-flavored country album. However, she was reluctant about the concept and ultimately abandoned the idea when meeting with Nashville writer Robert K. Oermann. Together, the pair found songs that would make up "My Roots Are Showing..". Oslin later stated the album's "roots" came from music that influenced her as a recording artist and performer: bluegrass, folk and blues.

== Content and recording ==
Oermann and Oslin collected ten songs that would make up the album's track listing. She had first found the songs "Down in the Valley" and "Hold Whatcha Got" before finishing finding the remainder of the album's material. All of the album's tracks were covers of songs first made popular by other music artists and writers. Among these songs was Webb Pierce's "Pathway of Teardrops" and Irving Berlin's "I'll See You in C-U-B-A." The album's eventual lead single, "Silver Tongue and Goldplated Lies" was a cover of the original recording by Jan Howard in 1983. Her version had also been a single and released on her studio effort, Tainted Love.

According to Bill Carpenter of Allmusic, the album's material was a mix of dance, rock and blues. For example, Carpenter commented that "Hold Whatcha Got" "rocks so hard it could have shot straight from the Jerry Lee Lewis songbook." Oslin later brought in engineer Rick Will to help with production. Will helped find Nashville session players to perform on the project. In a 1996 interview, Oslin spoke highly of the album's session players: "The songs and the players are the real stars here. I think everyone will copy the sounds on this record." "My Roots Are Showing..." was recorded at Woodland Studios, located in Nashville, Tennessee. Both Oslin and Will served as the project's co-producers, according to the liner notes.

== Release and reception ==
Professional ratings
Review scores
Source	Rating
AllMusic	2.5/5 stars

"My Roots Are Showing..." was released on October 1, 1996, on BNA Records. It was Oslin's fourth studio album released in her career. The album was originally issued as both a compact disc and a cassette. It would later be released to digital retailers, including Apple Music. Following its original 1996 release, Joe Galante believed the album to be radio-friendly and for it to perform well on the charts. However, "My Roots Are Showing..." only spent six weeks on the Billboard Top Country Albums and reached a peak position of 45 on the list in October 1996. The record was Oslin's lowest-charting album in the United States. Radio directors were drawn to Oslin's cover of "Silver Tongue and Goldplated Lies," which ultimately prompted her record label to release it as its first single. The single was released via BNA Records in July 1996. Yet after five weeks on the Billboard Hot Country Songs chart, it only reached a peak position of 64.

"My Roots Are Showing..." received mixed reviews from writers and critics following its release. In their October 1996 issue, Billboard magazine called the album "eclectic Americana" in response to the album's array of musical styles. "She's rearranged everything in her own, quirky style, and the result is a body of related work that would play just as well at the Rainbow Room as on a Mississippi riverboat," they commented. AllMusic's Bill Carpenter called the songs "gem[s]" but found the album to lack a marketing direction: "The only issue is that this was marketed as a country album when the Nashville element isn't terribly conspicuous."

== Track listings ==
=== Compact disc version ===
"My Roots Are Showing..."
No.	Title	Writer(s)	Original artist(s)	Length
1.	"Silver Tongue and Goldplated Lies"	John D. Hutchinson	Jan Howard	4:02
2.	"Sand Mountain Blues"	Alton Delmore; Rabon Delmore	The Delmore Brothers	2:49
3.	"Hold Whatcha Got"	Jimmy Martin	Jimmy Martin	3:15
4.	"Tear Time"	Jan Crutchfield	Wilma Burgess	2:40
5.	"(I'll See You in) Cuba"	Irving Berlin	Billy Murray	3:44
6.	"My Baby Came Back"	Charlie Louvin; Ira Louvin	The Louvin Brothers	2:36
7.	"Pathway of Teardrops"	Webb Pierce; Wayne Walker	Webb Pierce	4:01
8.	"Miss the Mississippi and You"	Bill Halley	Jimmie Rodgers	2:43
9.	"A Heart Needs a Home"	Richard Thompson	Richard and Linda Thompson	5:04
10.	"Down in the Valley"	Traditional	Traditional	5:44
Total length:				36:38

=== Cassette version ===
Side one
No.	Title	Writer(s)	Original artist(s)	Length
1.	"Silver Tongue and Goldplated Lies"	Hutchinson	Jan Howard	4:04
2.	"Sand Mountain Blues"	A. Delmore; R. Delmore	The Delmore Brothers	2:50
3.	"Hold Whatcha Got"	Martin	Jimmy Martin	3:15
4.	"Tear Time"	Crutchfield	Wilma Burgess	2:40
5.	"(I'll See You in) Cuba"	Berlin	Billy Murray	3:44

Side two
No.	Title	Writer(s)	Original artist(s)	Length
1.	"My Baby Came Back"	C. Louvin; I. Louvin	The Louvin Brothers	2:37
2.	"Pathway of Teardrops"	Pierce; Walker	Webb Pierce	4:02
3.	"Miss the Mississippi and You"	Halley	Jimmie Rodgers	2:43
4.	"A Heart Needs a Home"	Thompson	Richard and Linda Thompson	5:05
5.	"Down in the Valley"	Traditional	Traditional	5:44

=== Digital version ===
"My Roots Are Showing..."
No.	Title	Writer(s)	Original artist(s)	Length
1.	"Silver Tongue and Goldplated Lies"	Hutchinson	Jan Howard	4:04
2.	"Sand Mountain Blues"	A. Delmore; R. Delmore	The Delmore Brothers	2:50
3.	"Hold Whatcha Got"	Martin	Jimmy Martin	3:15
4.	"Tear Time"	Crutchfield	Wilma Burgess	2:40
5.	"(I'll See You in) Cuba"	Berlin	Billy Murray	3:44
6.	"My Baby Came Back"	C. Louvin; I. Louvin	The Louvin Brothers	2:37
7.	"Pathway of Teardrops"	Pierce; Walker	Webb Pierce	4:02
8.	"Miss the Mississippi and You"	Halley	Jimmie Rodgers	2:43
9.	"A Heart Needs a Home"	Thompson	Richard and Linda Thompson	5:05
10.	"Down in the Valley"	Traditional	Traditional	5:44

== Personnel ==
All credits are adapted from the liner notes of "My Roots Are Showing..." and Allmusic.

Musical personnel

- Sam Bush – mandolin
- Jerry Douglas – dobro, guitar
- Stuart Duncan – fiddle
- Mary Beth Felts – background vocals
- Joe Galante – background vocals
- Al Hagaman – background vocals
- Marc Harris – keyboards
- The Jordanaires – background vocals
- Jay Joyce – banjo, acoustic guitar, 12-string guitar
- Doug Lancio – acoustic guitar, baritone guitar, electric guitar, steel guitar
- Neal Matthews, Jr. – background vocals
- Susan Nadler – background vocals
- Dan Needham – drums
- Louis Dean Nunley – background vocals
- Robert K. Oermann – background vocals, consultant
- K. T. Oslin – background vocals, lead vocals
- Al Schlitz – background vocals
- Phyllis Schlitz – background vocals
- Evelyn Shriver – background vocals
- Tommy Sims – bass
- Gordon Stoker – background vocals
- Duane West – background vocals
- Rick Will – electric guitar

Technical personnel

- Jay Brown – engineer
- Susan Eddy – art direction
- Marc Frigo – assistant engineer
- Mary Hamilton – art direction
- Kris Kerr – production assistant
- Ken Love – mastering
- Rob McClain – engineer
- K. T. Oslin – producer
- Tom Roady – percussion
- Mark Seliger – photography
- Mike Simmons – engineer
- Paul Simmons – engineer
- Janice Soled – production coordinator
- Julie Wanca – design
- Rick Will – engineer, mixing, producer

== Chart performance ==
Chart (1996)	Peak position
US Top Country Albums (Billboard)	45

== Release history ==
Region	Date	Format	Label	Ref.
Europe	October 1, 1996	Compact disc	BNA Records	
United States	October 1, 1996	Compact disc	BNA Records	
United States	October 1, 1996	Cassette	BNA Records	
United States	2010s	Digital download; streaming	Sony Music Entertainment	
