= 30th Annual Grammy Awards =

1988 US music awards ceremony

- Date: March 2, 1988
- Location: Radio City Music Hall, New York City
- Hosted by: Billy Crystal
- Most awards: U2 (3)
- Most nominations: Emmylou Harris, Michael Jackson and U2 (4)

Television/radio coverage
- Network: CBS

The 30th Annual Grammy Awards were held March 2, 1988, at Radio City Music Hall, New York City. They recognized accomplishments by musicians from the previous year.

Album of the Year went to U2 for The Joshua Tree, and Song of the Year went to Barry Mann, Cynthia Weil and James Horner for "Somewhere Out There".

== Performers ==
Artist(s)	Song(s)
Whitney Houston	"I Wanna Dance with Somebody (Who Loves Me)"
George Benson	"Twice The Love"/ "Let's Do It Again"
Cab Calloway	"Minnie The Moocher"
Celia Cruz; Tito Puente; Lou Reed; Run DMC; Billy Joel	Tribute to the music of New York "Quimbara"; Walk On the Wild Side; Tougher Than Leather; New York State of Mind
Los Lobos	"La Bamba"
Suzanne Vega	"Luka" / "Tom's Diner"
Jackie Mason	Comedy routine
George Strait	"All My Ex's Live in Texas"
K. T. Oslin	"80's Ladies"
Randy Travis	"Forever and Ever, Amen"
Betsy Cook & Linda Thompson	"Telling Me Lies"
Restless Heart	"I'll Still Be Loving You"
Terence Trent D'Arby	"If You Let Me Stay" / "The First Cut Is the Deepest"
Jocko Henderson featuring The Angels; The Cadillacs; Dion; The Flamingos; The Regents; Lou Reed; Ruben Blades; Buster Poindexter	Tribute to Doo-wop "Speedoo" "Barbara Ann" "I Only Have Eyes For You" "My Boyfriend's Back" "A Teenager in Love
Michael Jackson	"The Way You Make Me Feel" / "Man in the Mirror"
Dion	"Runaround Sue"

== Presenters ==
- Roy Orbison & Bob Seger - Best Rock Vocal Performance Duo or Group
- Anita Baker & Robbie Robertson - Best Pop Vocal Performance, Female
- Patrick Swayze & Liza Minnelli - Best Musical Cast Show Album
- Billy Joel & Herbie Hancock - Song of the Year
- Steve Allen & Steven Wright - Best Comedy Recording
- Diana Ross & Herb Alpert - Album of the Year
- Dwight Yoakam & Rosanne Cash - Best Country Song
- LeVert & Jody Watley - Best R&B Vocal Performance, Male
- Emanuel Ax - Best Classical Album
- Ruben Blades & Al Jarreau - Producer of the Year
- Little Richard & Buster Poindexter - Best New Artist
- Quincy Jones & Lena Horne - Best Rock Solo Performance and Record of the Year

== Award winners ==
=== General ===
Record of the Year

- Graceland - Paul Simon
  - Paul Simon (producer)
- La Bamba – Los Lobos
  - Los Lobos & Mitchell Froom (producers)
- I Still Haven't Found What I'm Looking For – U2
  - Brian Eno & Daniel Lanois (producers)
- Luka – Suzanne Vega
  - Steve Addabbo & Lenny Kaye, (producers)
- Back in the High Life Again – Steve Winwood
  - Russ Titelman & Steve Winwood (producers)

Album of the Year

- The Joshua Tree – U2
  - Brian Eno & Daniel Lanois (producers)
- Whitney – Whitney Houston
  - Narada Michael Walden (producer)
- Bad – Michael Jackson
  - Michael Jackson & Quincy Jones (producers)
- Trio – Dolly Parton, Linda Ronstadt & Emmylou Harris
  - George Massenburg (producer)
- Sign o' the Times – Prince
  - Prince (producer)

Song of the Year

- Somewhere Out There - Linda Ronstadt & James Ingram
  - James Horner, Barry Mann & Cynthia Weil (songwriters)
- La Bamba - Los Lobos
  - Ritchie Valens (songwriter)
- I Still Haven't Found What I'm Looking For - U2
  - Adam Clayton, David Evans, Larry Mullen, Jr. & Paul Hewson (songwriters)
- Luka - Suzanne Vega
  - Suzanne Vega (songwriter)
- Didn't We Almost Have It All - Whitney Houston
  - Michael Masser & Will Jennings (songwriters)

Best New Artist

- Jody Watley
- Breakfast Club
- Cutting Crew
- Terence Trent D'Arby
- Swing Out Sister

=== Blues ===
- Best Traditional Blues Recording
  - Professor Longhair for Houseparty New Orleans Style
- Best Contemporary Blues Recording
  - The Robert Cray Band for Strong Persuader

=== Children's ===
- Best Recording for Children
  - Tom Bradshaw, Mark Sottnick (producers), Bobby McFerrin (producer & artist) & Jack Nicholson for The Elephant's Child

=== Classical ===
- Best Orchestral Recording
  - Michael Haas (producer), Georg Solti (conductor) & the Chicago Symphony Orchestra for Beethoven: Symphony No. 9 in D Minor
- Best Classical Vocal Soloist Performance
  - Kathleen Battle for Kathleen Battle - Salzburg Recital
- Best Opera Recording
  - Cord Garben (producer), James Levine (conductor), Agnes Baltsa, Kathleen Battle, Gary Lakes, Hermann Prey, Anna Tomowa-Sintow, & the Vienna Philharmonic Orchestra for R. Strauss: Ariadne Auf Naxos
- Best Choral Performance (other than opera)
  - Robert Shaw (conductor) & the Atlanta Symphony Orchestra & Chorus for Hindemith: When Lilacs Last in the Dooryard Bloom'd
- Best Classical Performance - Instrumental Soloist(s) (with orchestra)
  - James Levine (conductor), Itzhak Perlman & the Vienna Philharmonic for Mozart: Violin Concertos Nos. 2 and 4
- Best Classical Performance - Instrumental Soloist(s) (without orchestra)
  - Vladimir Horowitz for Horowitz in Moscow
- Best Chamber Music Performance
  - Vladimir Ashkenazy, Lynn Harrell, Itzhak Perlman & for Beethoven: The Complete Piano Trios
- Best Contemporary Composition
  - Krzysztof Penderecki (composer & conductor), Mstislav Rostropovich & the Philharmonia Orchestra for Penderecki: Cello Concerto No. 2
- Best Classical Album
  - Thomas Frost (producer) & Vladimir Horowitz for Horowitz in Moscow

=== Comedy ===
Best Comedy Recording

- "A Night at the Met" - Robin Williams

=== Composing and arranging ===
- Best Instrumental Composition
  - Ron Carter, Herbie Hancock, Billy Higgins & Wayne Shorter (composers) for Call Sheet Blues performed by various artists
- Best Song Written Specifically for a Motion Picture or Television
  - James Horner, Barry Mann & Cynthia Weil (songwriters) for Somewhere Out There performed by Linda Ronstadt & James Ingram
- Best Album of Original Instrumental Background Score Written for a Motion Picture or Television
  - Ennio Morricone (composer) for The Untouchables
- Best Arrangement on an Instrumental
  - Bill Holman (arranger) for Take The "A" Train performed by The Tonight Show Band with Doc Severinsen
- Best Instrumental Arrangement Accompanying Vocal(s)
  - Frank Foster (arranger) for Deedles' Blues performed by Diane Schuur & the Count Basie Orchestraか

=== Country ===
- Best Country Vocal Performance, Female
  - K. T. Oslin for 80's Ladies
- Best Country Vocal Performance, Male
  - Randy Travis for Always & Forever
- Best Country Performance by a Duo or Group with Vocal
  - Emmylou Harris, Dolly Parton & Linda Ronstadt for Trio
- Best Country Vocal Performance, Duet
  - Ronnie Milsap & Kenny Rogers for "Make No Mistake, She's Mine"
- Best Country Instrumental Performance (orchestra, group or soloist)
  - Asleep at the Wheel for String of Pars
- Best Country Song
  - Paul Overstreet & Don Schlitz (songwriters) for "Forever and Ever, Amen" performed by Randy Travis

=== Folk ===
- Best Traditional Folk Recording
  - Ladysmith Black Mambazo for Shaka Zulu
- Best Contemporary Folk Recording
  - Steve Goodman for Unfinished Business

=== Gospel ===
- Best Gospel Performance, Female
  - Deniece Williams for I Believe In You
- Best Gospel Performance, Male
  - Larnelle Harris for The Father Hath Provided
- Best Gospel Performance by a Duo or Group, Choir or Chorus
  - Mylon LeFevre and Broken Heart for Crack the Sky
- Best Soul Gospel Performance, Female
  - CeCe Winans for For Always
- Best Soul Gospel Performance, Male
  - Al Green for Everything's Gonna Be Alright
- Best Soul Gospel Performance by a Duo or Group, Choir or Chorus
  - The Winans & Anita Baker for Ain't No Need to Worry

=== Historical ===
- Best Historical Album
  - Orrin Keepnews (producer) for Thelonious Monk - The Complete Riverside Recordings

=== Jazz ===
- Best Jazz Vocal Performance, Female
  - Diane Schuur for Diane Schuur & the Count Basie Orchestra
- Best Jazz Vocal Performance, Male
  - Bobby McFerrin for What Is This Thing Called Love?
- Best Jazz Instrumental Performance, Soloist
  - Dexter Gordon for The Other Side of Round Midnight
- Best Jazz Instrumental Performance, Group
  - Wynton Marsalis for Marsalis Standard Time, Vol. I
- Best Jazz Instrumental Performance, Big Band
  - Mercer Ellington for Digital Duke
- Best Jazz Fusion Performance, Vocal or Instrumental
  - Pat Metheny Group for Still Life (Talking)

=== Latin ===
- Best Latin Pop Performance
  - Julio Iglesias for Un Hombre Solo
- Best Tropical Latin Performance
  - Eddie Palmieri for La Verdad - The Truth
- Best Mexican-American Performance
  - Los Tigres del Norte for Gracias!... América... Sin Fronteras

=== Musical show ===
- Best Musical Cast Show Album
  - Claude-Michel Schönberg (composer), Herbert Kretzmer (lyricist), Alain Boublil, Claude-Michel Schönberg (producers), & the original Broadway cast for Les Misérables

=== Music video ===
- Best Concept Music Video
  - Genesis for "Land of Confusion"
- Best Performance Music Video
  - Anthony Eaton (video producer) for The Prince's Trust All-Star Rock Concert performed by various artists

=== New Age ===
- Best New Age Performance
  - Yusef Lateef for Yusef Lateef's Little Symphony

=== Packaging and notes ===
- Best Album Package
  - Bill Johnson (art director) for King's Record Shop performed by Rosanne Cash
- Best Album Notes
  - Orrin Keepnews (notes writer) for Thelonious Monk - The Complete Riverside Recordings performed by Thelonious Monk

=== Polka ===
Best Polka Recording

- A Polka Just for Me – Jimmy Sturr

=== Pop ===
- Best Pop Vocal Performance, Female
  - "I Wanna Dance with Somebody (Who Loves Me)" – Whitney Houston
- Best Pop Vocal Performance, Male
  - "Bring on the Night (live)" – Sting
- Best Pop Performance by a Duo or Group with Vocal
  - "(I've Had) The Time of My Life" – Bill Medley & Jennifer Warnes
- Best Pop Instrumental Performance (Orchestra, Group or Soloist)
  - "Minute by Minute" – Larry Carlton

=== Production and engineering ===
- Best Engineered Recording, Non-Classical
  - Bruce Swedien & Humberto Gatica (engineers) for Bad performed by Michael Jackson
- Best Engineered Recording, Classical
  - Jack Renner (engineer), Robert Shaw (conductor) & the Atlanta Symphony Orchestra for Fauré: Requiem/Duruflé: Requiem
- Producer of the Year, (Non Classical)
  - Narada Michael Walden
- Classical Producer of the Year
  - Robert Woods

=== R&B ===
- Best R&B Vocal Performance, Female
  - Aretha Franklin for Aretha
- Best R&B Vocal Performance, Male
  - Smokey Robinson for "Just to See Her"
- Best R&B Performance by a Duo or Group with Vocal
  - Aretha Franklin & George Michael for "I Knew You Were Waiting (For Me)"
- Best R&B Instrumental Performance (Orchestra, Group or Soloist)
  - David Sanborn for "Chicago Song"
- Best Rhythm & Blues Song
  - Bill Withers (songwriter) for "Lean on Me" performed by Club Nouveau

=== Reggae ===
- Best Reggae Recording
  - No Nuclear War – Peter Tosh

=== Rock ===
- Best Rock Vocal Performance, Solo
  - "Tunnel of Love" – Bruce Springsteen
- Best Rock Performance by a Duo or Group with Vocal
  - The Joshua Tree – U2
- Best Rock Instrumental Performance (Orchestra, Group or Soloist)
  - "Jazz from Hell" – Frank Zappa

=== Spoken ===
- Best Spoken Word or Non-musical Recording
  - Garrison Keillor for Lake Wobegon Days
