= Money (K. T. Oslin song) =

Single by K. T. Oslin

from the album This Woman
- B-side: "Dr., Dr."
- Released: July 9, 1988
- Genre: Country
- Length: 4:43
- Label: RCA Records
- Songwriter(s): K. T. Oslin
- Producer(s): Harold Shedd

K. T. Oslin singles chronology
"I'll Always Come Back" (1988)	"Money" (1988)	"Hold Me" (1988)

"Money" is a song written and recorded by American country music artist K. T. Oslin. It was released in July 1988 as the first single from the album This Woman. The song reached #13 on the Billboard Hot Country Singles & Tracks chart.

It was after listening to this song and its message that Charles Van Doren decided to not participate in the 1994 Robert Redford film Quiz Show as a consultant.

== Chart performance ==
Chart (1988)	Peak position
US Hot Country Songs (Billboard)	13
Canadian RPM Country Tracks	11
