= 80's Ladies =

Studio album by K. T. Oslin
- Released: June 30, 1987
- Studio: The Music Mill, Nashville, TN
- Genre: Country
- Length: 34:18
- Label: RCA Victor
- Producer: Harold Shedd

K. T. Oslin chronology
80's Ladies (1987)	This Woman (1988)

Singles from 80's Ladies
- 1. "Wall of Tears" Released: January 9, 1987; 2. "80's Ladies" Released: April 24, 1987; 3. "Do Ya'" Released: September 11, 1987; 4. "I'll Always Come Back" Released: January 8, 1988; 5. "Younger Men" Released: July 25, 1988 (UK)

Alternative cover
- Cover of the vinyl version of the album

80's Ladies is the debut studio album by American country music artist K. T. Oslin, released on June 30, 1987, by RCA Records. The album, her first, propelled her to success in mainstream country, after an earlier first failed attempt with Elektra Records consisting of two singles released in 1982. At 43 years old, she secured a record deal in 1986 after meeting with Alabama producer Harold Shedd and RCA executive Joe Galante. The album prompted her to quickly become one of the hottest new commercial breakthrough in a unconventional sound featuring country pop, southern blues, and rock music.

Commercially, 80's Ladies became Oslin's first and only album to top the Billboard Top Country Albums chart in the United States, following peaking at number 68 on the Billboard 200 albums chart and was certified platinum by the Recording Industry Association of America (RIAA) in the United States and gold by Music Canada (MC). This was Oslin's highest debut to break the record in the country chart as a female country artist. It has sold more than one million copies worldwide.

Following its release, the album built a lifelong string of success among three of its commercial singles—"80's Ladies", "Do Ya", and "I'll Always Come Back"—peaked within the top ten of the US Billboard Hot Country Singles chart, while two of the singles had topped on that chart. While her self-titled track, "80's Ladies" reached the top ten, it received a significant praise by fans and critics, eventually winning Best Female Country Vocal Performance at the 1987 Grammy Awards. Oslin became the first woman to win "Song of the Year" at the Country Music Association Awards. The song also earned Oslin the top female vocalist award at the Academy of Country Music Awards (ACM) and won the ACM award for music video of the year. Its accompanying singles received several accolades throughout 1988, and fairly favorable reviews from music critics. Following the album's release, Oslin embarked on tours with Alabama and George Strait.

== Background ==
Between the late 1970s and the early 1980s, K. T. Oslin wrote songs that brought her to the attention of a performance rights group, SESAC. At the same time, she also sang on Guy Clark's eponymous album. Diana Petty, a Nashville executive for SESAC, advised Oslin to sign a major label contract. By 1979, Oslin was signed with Elektra via a "singles-only" contract, with Petty's support. Only two singles were issued on the label, which were both commercial failures. The song "Clean Your Own Tables" was on the charts for "about a minute and a half ... [and] died a fiery death", Oslin recalled. She was dropped by the label in 1982 and returned to New York, which she found her work unsatisfying. She continued to write songs, and was named "Most Promising Country Music Writer" by SESAC that same year. She made an appearance on a live radio broadcast in 1984 to try to connect with more musicians. Oslin fell into a depressive state due to her lack of commercial success and later said that she had suffered "several '4 a.m. anxiety attacks'". Petty continued to encourage her, and she did work with Judy Rodman, Dottie West, Gail Davies, and The Judds.

Eventually, Oslin made another effort to regain a recording contract. By the beginning of 1986, she had borrowed $7,000 from her aunt, lost 40 pounds, and temporarily acquired a Nashville nightclub, inviting music executives to a one-time live showcase, expecting phone calls from them afterwards. She recalled that "the next morning, I sat waiting for the phone to ring", but did not succeed in landing a contract.

Chuck Neese, who attended the showcase, wanted to sign Oslin to a record label on the spot. He told Oslin that her age could serve as an advantage in music, citing that her "timing was right". Nashville producer Harold Shedd, who had recently been successful working with Alabama, also attended at the suggestion of Petty. Shedd convinced Oslin to record three of her tunes, which was then cut to demos that was sent directly to RCA Records. Through Shedd's connections with the label, Oslin met RCA Nashville executive Joe Galante, who believed that Oslin had potential due to her outstanding songwriting and voice. Galante later shared that he had feelings for her in a 2020 interview saying, "I remember thinking when I saw K.T., "Holy shit. This is not an ingenue, this is a woman." Within the first couple of minutes, it was just love. I really did fall in love. That personality was so disarming, probably because of all the time she'd spent on touring companies and Broadway. She'd worked her ass off to get that meeting. This was her last chance and it was fortunate for both of us." At age 43, Oslin was offered a contract and signed to RCA at that year.

== Production and composition ==
After signing with the label, Oslin immediately commenced songwriting, creating five new tracks. Recording sessions for 80's Ladies took place at The Music Mill from early to late 1986 in Nashville, Tennessee, where the rhythm tracks and vocal overdubs were done. Harold Shedd served as the album's sole producer. The recording was done digitally using a 32-track X850 Mitsubishi PCM tape recorder. Oslin provided lead vocals and played keyboards on the album. Additional keyboards were contributed by David Briggs, known for his extensive work with Nashville musicians, and Gary Prim. Guitar parts were recorded by Bruce Dees, Steve Gibson, and Brent Rowan, with Rowan also playing acoustic guitar. The track "Dr., Dr." notably features guitar overdubs. Drummers Eddie Bayers, Larrie Londin, and James Stroud contributed to the rhythm section, alongside bass parts recorded by Mike Brignardello and Larry Paxton. Sam Levine played saxophone on the album, with his contributions being particularly notable on the track "I'll Always Come Back". Terry McMillan, who was also a solo artist, provided the harmonica tracks. Backing vocals were added by Joe Scaife, while Costo Davis played synthesizers. The album was engineered by Jim Cotton and Joe Scaife, with assistance from George W. Clinton and Paul Goldberg. The album was mixed and edited by Milan Bogdan, and mastering was done by Hank Williams.

=== Music and lyrics ===
80's Ladies' sound has been described as a "blend of pop and southern-blues-and-rock". AllMusic journalist Rodney Batdorf describes it as "a new voice in country music", crediting Oslin's voice as a narrator for "a whole generation of women about the social changes". Lyrically, the album's material appears to be largely autobiographical, about Oslin's career in music, but Oslin denied that it was only about her: "It's indeed not my life story – it's everybody's life story". Oslin said that the songs were about experiences of people that she knew: "I do write from a personal point of view. I see what my friends are going through ... how they react to relationships."

Oslin's title track starts as a piano riff that is comparable to those of Jackson Browne. According to Oslin, it took her approximately a year to write the lyrical arrangements, starting it off as a "little [show] piece"; she did not initially envision it as a single, let alone a hit song. In promotional copy for Oslin's 2002 RCA Country Legends compilation, Rich Kienzle wrote that the song "captured the feelings of middle-aged women everywhere". Oslin herself stated that the lyrics were inspired by her best friend's photo showing her ten-year-old daughter looking identical to the friend at the same age. The song describes the long friendship of two people who have known each other since childhood.

The song "Wall of Tears", which was written by Richard Leigh and Peter McCann, was produced as a cover song. Oslin wrote "I'll Always Come Back" as a quiet love song inspired by Little Bo-Peep and a boomerang. The song "Do Ya" is a eulogy for the relationship of a couple who have been married for five years, although Oslin suggested that the relationship on which the song was based actually spanned about thirteen years.

"Younger Men", "Dr., Dr." and "Lonely But Only for You" were written earlier, between 1982 through 1985, before Oslin revived her solo career. "Younger Men" was written by Oslin and was described as "a woman of forty checking out younger guys". Jerry Sharpe from The Pittsburgh Press said that the song "reverses the role about middle-aged men trying to regain youth through a fling with young women". The song dates back to 1982, a follow-up to her first single, "Clean Your Own Tables", which failed commercially. It was re-recorded for 80's Ladies. "Lonely But Only for You", written by Oslin in collaboration with Rory Bourke and Charlie Black (the song was Black's sole contribution to the album), was originally composed for actress Sissy Spacek and featured on her 1983 album Hangin' Up My Heart. Spacek's version peaked at number 15 on Billboard's Hot Country songs and number 10 on the Bubbling Under Hot 100 chart. "Dr., Dr.", described as "bluesy, brazzy and jazzy" by the Indianapolis Star, describes a songwriter going to see a doctor about a broken heart. The song previously appeared as the B-side of the 1982 version of "Younger Men", initially titled "How Many Loves Have I Got Left".

"Two Hearts", written by Oslin and Bourke, has a "self-assertive theme" about a "lonely K. T." offering comfort to a lonely stranger in a bar. A re-recorded version of the song was later featured on Oslin's 1990 album Love in a Small Town. It was released as a single prior to the album's release, reaching number 73 on the U.S. Country chart. "Old Pictures" was written by Oslin and Jerry Gillespie. They were convinced at first that it was "a Kodak jingle" tune. They worked on the lyrics for a couple of years. "Old Pictures" deals with a woman reminiscing over her photographs of her close relatives and her loved ones. The Judds later recorded the song for their Heartland album, not long before Oslin released the song.

== Release and promotion ==
Promotional single airplay ensued on country radio stations in early 1987. The album was slated to be released in March of that year, but was delayed to June for unspecified reasons. The album was released on June 30, 1987, by RCA Nashville and BMG Music. It also received a UK release on March 28, 1988. In order to have major country artists to be heard outside North America, specifically in the United Kingdom, Country Music Association organized the "Route 88" campaign via a joint-label promotion, which included Oslin in the roster. The major campaign lasted in June, which paved for Oslin's first performance outside America in London.

=== Tour ===
In September 1987, Oslin began assembling a tour, supported by her backing band, to promote her album across the southern and eastern sections of the United States. The tour began in mid-January 1988 and continued throughout the year as an opening act for Alabama and George Strait. Oslin also co-opened and performed with Restless Heart, Merle Haggard, and Randy Travis. The tour ended in October 1988, two months after the release of her second album.

== Commercial performance ==
80's Ladies debuted at number 145 on the Billboard 200 on December 12, 1987, and at number 15 on the Top Country Albums on August 8, 1987. This was Billboard's highest-ever debut for a female country artist in the country chart at the time, with Oslin surpassing Loretta Lynn's debut at number 18 in January 1964 with Loretta Lynn Sings. Thirty weeks later, it topped the Top Country Albums on February 27, 1988. Just sixteen weeks after its debut on the Billboard 200, it peaked at number 68. Altogether, it had spent 32 weeks on the Billboard 200 and 148 weeks in the Top Country Albums chart. It also peaked at number 67 on Cashbox Top 200 and at number one on its subdivision Country Albums chart. 80's Ladies sold about 400,000 copies by February 1988. By March 22, it was certified gold by the Recording Industry Association of America (RIAA) for sales of over 500,000 copies. Fifteen months later, the album was certified platinum, denoting over 1 million shipped within the United States. In Canada, it was certified gold by Music Canada (MC) for sales of over 50,000 copies in that country. Since its debut, 80's Ladies has sold over one million worldwide.

== Singles ==
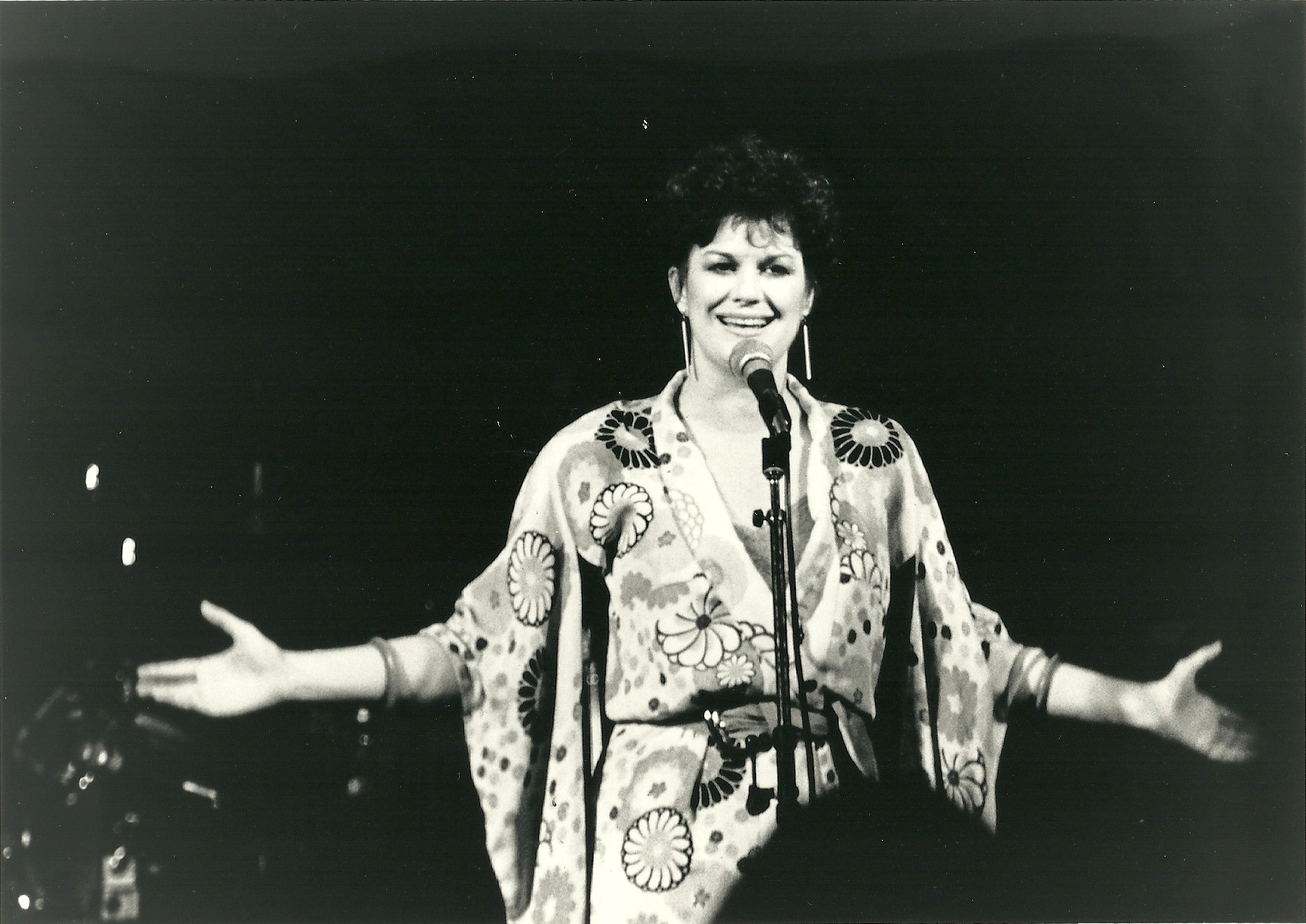
Oslin showcasing as a debut artist in 1987.

"Wall of Tears" was released as the first single on January 9, 1987, and reached number 40 on the Billboard Hot Country Songs chart, staying on the chart for 15 weeks. Her second and most successful single, "80's Ladies", was released on April 24, 1987, and reached number seven on the Billboard Country Singles chart, staying for 21 weeks on that chart, and reached number four on RPM's Canadian Country Tracks. With "80's Ladies", Oslin became first woman to win "Song of the Year" at the Country Music Association Awards (CMAs). The song also earned Oslin a nomination at the Academy of Country Music Awards. The song won Oslin the Grammy Award for Best Female Country Vocal Performance in 1988.

"Do Ya" was released on September 11, 1987, and peaked at the top spot on the Billboard Country Singles chart and was number three in Canada. It was Oslin's longest-charting single at the time, with 25 weeks. The song also received multiple nominations at the CMAs. "I'll Always Come Back" was released on January 8, 1988 and again earned the top spot on both the U.S. and Canadian country charts. "Younger Men" was released on July 25, 1988 as a single exclusively in the UK.

Music videos were produced for "80's Ladies" and "I'll Always Come Back". Both were produced by Marc W. Ball and directed by Jack Cole and John Lloyd Miller. The video for "80's Ladies" won ACM's "Country Music Video of the Year", and "I'll Always Come Back" was nominated for the same award.

== Critical reception ==
Professional ratings
Review scores
Source	Rating
AllMusic	3/5 stars
Christgau's Record Guide	B
MusicRow	5/5 stars
The Philadelphia Inquirer	3/4 stars
The Rolling Stone Album Guide	3/5 stars

80's Ladies was met with positive reviews from country and contemporary music critics. In a promotional record label review publication, Ralph Novak from People said the album was "as wryly funny, tuneful and all-around enjoyable as country music gets". He described the songwriting as reflecting "a Kristofferson-like blend of cynical and romantic", giving kudos to Oslin's performance. A review from The Philadelphia Inquirer noted that Oslin's music "addresses marriage, divorce, motherhood and middle-age dating in a way" that had not been seen in the country genre "in a long time", and compared the record's title track to Merle Haggard's "Okie from Muskogee", calling it a "rabble-rouser". MusicRow's magazine staff called 80's Ladies "the best sign of country music's renewed health ... new artists who come from nowhere and quickly redefine the field to fit their vision". They praised Oslin's songwriting as "proving how just flexible a rigid form can become in an intelligent writer's hands", while Billboard's Gerry Wood described the songs as having "sass and sagacity".

Critic Robert Christgau said that on 80's Ladies, Oslin "asserts herself only when she writes a song all by her lonesome on tracks". However, he called the second half of the album "dreck", describing its dramatic qualities "down to the last overripe chord change". He approved of Oslin's vocal style and concluded the review with a "B" rating. Country Music People staff praised Oslin's voice as "strong and gusty" and liked her songwriting. AllMusic's Rodney Batdorf felt that the songwriting "remained the same" but was "given a new viewpoint"; he said that 80's Ladies contained "a few weak tracks", but concluded his review by declaring it "an exciting, fresh change".

Joe Sasfy, writing for The Washington Post, described Oslin as "a can't-miss country star", saying that her work was "proof that Nashville's future doesn't depend on fiddles and steel guitars so much as on singer-songwriters who can make you feel they're singing your life". John Wooley from Tulsa World declared it "the voice of experience", saying that Oslin's songs "are good ones – tough and poetic, full of heartbreak, tenderness and intelligence". Nashville-based music journalist Robert K. Oermann, writing for Gannett newspapers, described the singer's debut as introducing "a major new recording personality", while praising the title track as "a warm, earthy, good-humored anthem that is 'real' as anything Patsy Cline or Dolly Parton ever sang". A Stereo Review writer said that the performance was "the real stuff" and that the recording for 80's Ladies was "sparkling". The writer said that "Oslin is really more Southern rock-and-blues than country, influenced more by Chuck Berry than Ernest Tubb". The writer described the production as "topnotch", concluding that the album would be "impossible to ignore".

=== Accolades ===
Organization	Award	Year	Ref.
Grammy Awards	Best Female Country Vocal Performance ("80's Ladies")	1987	
Academy of Country Music Awards	Top New Female Vocalist, Country Music Video of the Year ("80's Ladies")	1987	
Academy of Country Music Awards	Top Female Vocalist, Single Record of the Year ("I'll Always Come Back")	1988	
Country Music Association Awards	Female Vocalist of the Year, Song of the Year ("80's Ladies")	1988	
SESAC	National Performance Activity ("Younger Men")	1991	

== Track listing ==
All tracks are written by K. T. Oslin, except where noted.

Side one
No.	Title	Writer(s)	Length
1.	"Wall of Tears"	Richard Leigh; Peter McCann	3:45
2.	"I'll Always Come Back"		4:08
3.	"Younger Men"		3:06
4.	"80's Ladies"		4:13

Side two
No.	Title	Writer(s)	Length
1.	"Do Ya'"		4:05
2.	"Two Hearts"	Oslin; Rory Bourke	4:10
3.	"Dr., Dr."	Oslin; Jerry Gillespie	3:28
4.	"Lonely But Only for You"	Charlie Black; Bourke; Oslin	3:10
5.	"Old Pictures"	Oslin; Gillespie	4:13
Total length:			34:18

== Personnel ==
Credits are adapted from liner notes.

Musicians

- K. T. Oslin – vocals, keyboards
- David Briggs – keyboards
- Gary Prim – keyboards
- Costo Davis – synthesizer
- Bruce Dees – electric guitar
- Steve Gibson – electric guitar
- Brent Rowan – acoustic guitar, electric guitar
- Mike Brignardello – bass guitar
- Larry Paxton – bass guitar
- Eddie Bayers – drums
- Larrie Londin – drums
- James Stroud – drums
- Sam Levine – saxophone
- Terry McMillan – harmonica
- Joe Scaife – backing vocals

Production

- Harold Shedd – producer
- Jim Cotton; Joe Scaife – engineers, associate producers
- George W. Clinton; Paul Goldberg – assistant engineers
- Milan Bogdan – digital editing
- Hank Williams – mastering
- Mary Hamilton – art design
- Beverly Parker – photography
- Charlie McCallen – hand tinting
- Letha Rodman – make-up

== Charts ==
=== Weekly charts ===
Chart (1987–89)	Peak position
US Billboard 200	68
US Top Country Albums (Billboard)	1
US Cash Box 200	67
US Cash Box Country Albums	1

=== Year-end charts ===
Chart (1987)	Position
US Billboard 200	96
US Top Country Albums (Billboard)	5
US Cash Box 200	79
US Cash Box Country Albums	3

Chart (1988)	Position
US Top Country Albums (Billboard)	23
US Top Country Albums Awards (Billboard)	3
US Cash Box Country Albums	33
US Cash Box Top 50 Country Awards	6

Chart (1989)	Position
US Top Country Albums (Billboard)	49

== Certifications ==
Certifications for 80's Ladies
Region	Certification	Certified units/sales
Canada (Music Canada)	Gold	50,000^{^}
United States (RIAA)	Platinum	1,000,000^{^}
Summaries
Worldwide	—	1,000,000
^{^} Shipments figures based on certification alone.

== Release history ==
Release formats for 80's Ladies
Region	Date	Format(s)	Label(s)	Ref.
North America	June 30, 1987	LP; cassette; CD	RCA Nashville; BMG	
United Kingdom	March 28, 1988	Cassette; CD	RCA Nashville; BMG	
North America	August 1990	Cassette; CD	RCA Nashville; BMG	
Worldwide	2012	Digital download; streaming	Legacy; Sony	
