= Simply (K. T. Oslin album) =

Studio album by K. T. Oslin
- Released: June 2, 2015
- Studios: Bone-Us-Trax; Studio White House; White Rock Studios
- Genre: Country
- Length: 35:17
- Label: Red River
- Producers: Jimmy Nichols; K. T. Oslin

K. T. Oslin chronology
Live Close By, Visit Often (2001)	Simply (2015)

Simply is the sixth and final studio album by American country singer–songwriter K. T. Oslin. It was released on June 2, 2015 via Red River Entertainment and contained nine tracks. The project was co-produced by Oslin herself and Jimmy Nichols. Simply was Oslin's first studio release in 14 years and included a mix of re-recordings and new material. The album would also be the final release of new music in her career.

== Background and content ==
Prior to the release of Simply, K. T. Oslin had been away from the public eye for over a decade. In 2014, she returned to performing with a live cabaret-themed show. The program included newer versions of her former hits and some new material. The success of the show led to the album's creation. Simply was recorded in sessions held at three studios: Bone-Us-Trax, Studio White House and White Rock Studios. It also recorded in the basement of her band's bass player. The sessions were co-produced by Oslin, as well as Jimmy Nichols. The project was completed in a time span of three days.

The album contained one new song ("Do You Think About Me") and eight new versions of Oslin's previously recorded material. This included remakes of some of her biggest hits, such as "Hold Me" and "80's Ladies." In a 2015 interview, Oslin explained that she felt differently about her former hits and chose to simplify their production for these reasons. The album also included re-recordings of songs that may be lesser-known to fans, such as "Younger Men" and "New Way Home."

== Critical reception ==
Professional ratings
Review scores
Source	Rating
Country Universe	4/5 stars
Digital Journal	4.5/5 stars
Roughstock	Favorable

Simply received positive reviews from critics and writers following its release. Markos Papadatos of Digital Journal gave the project a 4.5 star rating in his review. He called the album's material "nostalgic" in the way that the re-recordings evoked memories of Oslin's early years. He also used words like "strong" and "crystalline" to describe her voice. Papadatos concluded by saying, "Overall, K.T. Oslin delivers on her latest comeback album Simply. Her vocals are all spot-on and remarkable. The arrangements are different, yet neat."

In addition, Ben Foster of Country Universe gave Simply a four-star rating. "While “Do You Think About Me” is our only taste of new Oslin songwriting for now, Simply is nonetheless a worthwhile acquisition for its success in making the old feel new again," he concluded. Matt Bjorke of Roughstock also gave the release a positive response. He praised Oslin's vocal performance, commenting that she was in "fine voice" despite being 74 years old. Bjorke also praised the production of Oslin's co-producer (Jimmy Nichols) for helping create simple arrangements for the project.

== Release ==
On November 21, 2014, a thirteen minute long video was uploaded to YouTube featuring ninety-second snippet tracks from the album, which it claimed to be released on that date. On the contrary, Simply was officially released on June 2, 2015 via Red River Entertainment. It was Oslin's sixth studio release in her career. It was also her first studio release on an independent record label. The album was made available as a compact disc and as a digital download. The project did not chart on any Billboard music surveys, including the Top Country Albums chart, where all of her previous studio albums charted. According to Oslin, the album was simply meant to be sold along with her live show. No additional promotion was given to the record. "We’re not trying to get back on a label or make a big splash with this. We just wanted to make a record for fans to buy at shows," she commented. Simply would mark Oslin's final album release in her career. After being diagnosed with Parkinson's disease, she would die in 2020.

== Track listing ==
Simply (CD and digital versions)
No.	Title	Writer(s)	Length
1.	"Do You Think About Me"	Al Anderson; K. T. Oslin	3:36
2.	"Younger Men"	Oslin	3:51
3.	"Hold Me"	Oslin	4:57
4.	"I Can't Remember Not Loving You"	Anderson; Raul Malo; Oslin	3:18
5.	"Live Close By, Visit Often"	Malo; Oslin	3:14
6.	"New Way Home"	Oslin	3:59
7.	"She Don't Talk Like Us No More"	Josh Mostel; Oslin	3:58
8.	"Maybe We Should Learn to Tango"	Malo; Oslin	3:43
9.	"80's Ladies"	Oslin	4:41
Total length:			35:17

== Personnel ==
All credits are adapted from the liner notes of Simply and Allmusic.

Musical personnel

- Mike Durham – electric guitar
- Dennis Holt – background vocals, drums
- Jimmy Nichols – background vocals, keyboards
- K. T. Oslin – lead vocals
- David Santos – background vocals, bass, guitar

Technical personnel

- Jeff Balding – mixing
- John Gertin – assistant
- Tonya Ginnetti – production assistant
- Andrew Mendelson – mastering
- Jimmy Nichols – engineer, producer
- K. T. Oslin – producer

== Release history ==
Region	Date	Format	Label	Ref.
United States	June 2, 2015	Compact disc	Red River Entertainment; The Orchard/Sony Music	
United States	June 2, 2015	Digital download; streaming	Red River Entertainment; The Orchard/Sony Music	
