= Live Close By, Visit Often =

Studio album by K. T. Oslin
- Released: March 6, 2001
- Studios: Cucaracha; SoundShop
- Genres: Country; contemporary country
- Length: 42:34
- Label: BNA
- Producers: Raul Malo; K. T. Oslin

K. T. Oslin chronology
"My Roots Are Showing..." (1996)	Live Close By, Visit Often (2001)	Simply (2015)

Singles from Live Close By, Visit Often
- 1. "Live Close By, Visit Often" Released: March 2001; 2. "Come on-a My House" Released: July 2001; 3. "Drivin', Cryin', Missin' You" Released: September 3, 2001

Live Close By, Visit Often is The Fifth studio album by American country singer–songwriter K. T. Oslin. It was released on March 6, 2001, via BNA Records and contained 12 tracks. The album was co-produced by Oslin and Raul Malo. The project was Oslin's first in five years and second to be issued on the BNA label. It included a mix of new material and cover songs. Its title track was a charting single, as well as its cover of "Come on-a My House." Live Close By, Visit Often would reach a charting position following its release and receive reviews from music publications as well.

== Background ==
K. T. Oslin's recording career had slowed down following several personal setbacks. Notably in 1995, she underwent Quadruple Bypass Surgery, but ended up making a full recovery. She would the release 1996's "My Roots Are Showing...", but then went into another musical hiatus following the album. Oslin would then go into record Live Close By, Visit Often five years later. The album's title was partly inspired by a Katharine Hepburn quote related to marriage and relationships. The project was recorded at two studios: Cucaracha Studios and SoundShop. Both studios were located in Nashville, Tennessee. The project was produced by Raul Malo, who was known for his membership of the band, The Mavericks. Oslin also served as co-producer on the record, making it her third project where she received production credits.

== Content ==
Live Close By, Visit Often contained a total of 12 tracks. Seven of its songs were written (or co-written) by Oslin, including the title track. Malo received songwriting credits on three of the album's songs, including the title track. However, Oslin receives full songwriting credits on two of the album's tracks: "Mexico Road" and "Neva Sawyer." Jim Abbott of the Orlando Sentinel described "Neva Sawyer" as "a modern-day folk tale about a circus high-wire walker with a naughty streak."

The remaining five tunes were cover versions of songs first recorded by others. Included are covers of American standards, such as Rosemary Clooney's "Come on-a My House." Oslin's version was re-created in a new style that included pieces of electronic dance music. The additional covers featured string instrumentation, which was similar to the way the songs were first recorded. Cole Porter's "What Is This Thing Called Love?," Helen Morgan's "Mean to Me," and "If You Were the Only Boy in the World" all received this musical style.

== Critical reception ==
Professional ratings
Review scores
Source	Rating
AllMusic	2/5 stars

Live Close By, Visit Often received mixed reviews from music writers and critics. In June 2001, Billboard magazine profiled the album as part of their "album spotlight" series. Writer Ray Widdell called the record "classy, brassy, musically adventurous and stylish." He found the album's covers to be "refreshing" and he praised Oslin's vocal performance throughout the record. "This record is a triumphant return for Oslin," Widdell concluded. The Orlando Sentinel's Jim Abbott also praised the album in his review, highlighting the album's originality in musical production and vocal performance. "Oslin's perspective is smarter and more mature than the overwrought one-dimensional approach that defines country radio playlists," he commented.

Maria Konicki Dinoia of AllMusic found that the album lacked a direction, saying that it was "too eclectic" to be considered country and "too divergent to call pop." However, she concluded the review on a positive note: "Either way, music doesn't have to be definable or categorized to make it good -- or even interesting -- and Oslin's unmediated vocals are always a pleasure to listen to, no matter what she's singing about."

Alanna Nash of Entertainment Weekly had similar findings, calling the album "schizophrenic" in regards to its diverse music collection. Nash also praised Oslin's songwriting efforts, calling the original tracks to be "great grooves." Robert Loy of Country Standard Time gave the album a mixed reaction. He found some of the album's material to be too mature for a female artist of Oslin's age to sing. "The problem is that she's an "Eighties Lady," old enough to be somebody's grandmother, and we are really uncomfortable with grandmotherly sex. And most other mature relationships," Loy stated. However, he did praise songs such as "Neva Sawyer" for their "raw emotion" and "Come on-a My House" for its original production.

== Release and chart performance ==
Live Close By, Visit Often was released on March 6, 2001 via BNA Records. It was Oslin's fifth studio release and her second to be issued on the BNA label. It was originally issued as a compact disc. In later years, the album would be available to digital retailers, including Apple Music. The album spent 11 weeks on the Billboard Top Country Albums and reached a peak of 35 by July 2001. It would be Oslin's final album to chart. At the time of its release, Live Close By, Visit Often was Oslin's highest-charting album in over ten years and sold a total of 4,000 copies within its first week.

The album spawned its title track as the first single release in March 2001. The song spent nine weeks on the Billboard Hot Country Songs chart and peaked at number 53 in April 2001. It was Oslin's first charting-single on the country chart since 1996. It would also be her final chart appearance on the country survey. It would be followed by the second single in July 2001, "Come on-a My House." The single was her first and only song to chart on the Billboard Hot Dance Club Songs list, where it peaked at number 40 that August. The final single released was "Drivin,' Cryin,' Missin' You" on September 3, 2001. The single failed to chart.

== Track listing ==
Live Close By, Visit Often (CD and digital versions)
No.	Title	Writer(s)	Length
1.	"Live Close By, Visit Often"	Raul Malo; K. T. Oslin	3:48
2.	"I Can't Remember Not Loving You"	Malo; Oslin	3:42
3.	"Somebody's Leavin' Somebody"	Malo; Oslin	3:54
4.	"Drivin,' Cryin,' Missin' You"	Oslin; Micheal Smotherman	4:03
5.	"Neva Sawyer"	Oslin	5:51
6.	"A Moment of Forever"	Kris Kristofferson; Danny Timms	3:58
7.	"Mexico Road"	Oslin	3:25
8.	"Maybe We Should Learn to Tango"	Malo; Oslin	3:39
9.	"If You Were the Only Boy in the World"	Nat D. Ayer; Clifford Grey	1:27
10.	"Mean to Me"	Fred E. Ahlert; Roy Turk	2:18
11.	"What Is This Thing Called Love"	Cole Porter	2:14
12.	"Come on-a My House"	Ross Bagdasarian; William Saroyan	4:15
Total length:			42:34

== Personnel ==
All credits are adapted from the liner notes of Live Close By, Visit Often and Allmusic.

Musical personnel

- Ray Agee – trombone
- Bobby Blazier – drums
- Dennis Burnside – piano
- Mark Casstevens – acoustic guitar
- Vinnie Ciesielski – trumpet
- Jeff Coffin – baritone saxophone
- Kim Fleming – background vocals
- Carl Gorodetzky – violin
- Jim Grosjean – viola
- Vicki Hampton – background vocals
- Jim Hoke – baritone saxophone
- Scotty Huff – trumpet
- Michael Joyce – bass
- Raul Malo – background vocals, bass
- Jeff Roach – organ
- Pamela Sixfin – violin
- Kenny Vaughan – electric guitar
- Glenn Worf – bass

Technical personnel

- Mike Bradley – engineer, mixing
- Mark Capps – assistant engineer, mixing
- Glen Caruba – percussion
- Andrew Eccles – photography
- Kelly Giedt – production coordination
- Scotty Huff – horn arrangements
- Beth Lee – art direction
- Michael Lee – arranger, engineer, programming
- Raul Malo – producer
- K. T. Oslin – producer
- Hank Williams – mastering

== Chart performance ==
Chart (2001)	Peak position
US Top Country Albums (Billboard)	35

== Release history ==
Region	Date	Format	Label	Ref.
Europe	March 6, 2001	Compact disc	BNA Records	
United States	March 6, 2001	Compact disc	BNA Records	
United States	2010s	Digital download; streaming	Sony Music Entertainment	
