= Love in a Small Town =

Studio album by K. T. Oslin
- Released: November 6, 1990
- Genre: Country
- Length: 39:01
- Label: RCA Records
- Producer: Barry Beckett; Jim Cotton; Larry Michael Lee; Josh Leo; K. T. Oslin; Joe Scaife

K. T. Oslin chronology
This Woman (1988)	Love in a Small Town (1990)	Love in a Small Town (1991)

Singles from Love in a Small Town
- 1. "Two Hearts" Released: May 25, 1990; 2. "Come Next Monday" Released: September 3, 1990; 3. "Mary and Willie" Released: February 16, 1991; 4. "You Call Everybody Darlin'" Released: May 1991; 5. "Cornell Crawford" Released: September 1991

Professional ratings
Review scores
Source	Rating
AllMusic	4/5 stars

Love in a Small Town is the third studio album by American country music artist K. T. Oslin, released by RCA Records on November 6, 1990. "Two Hearts", "Come Next Monday", "Mary and Willie", "You Call Everybody Darling" and "Cornell Crawford" were released as singles. The album reached No. 5 on the Top Country Albums chart and has been certified Gold by the RIAA.

== Track listing ==
No.	Title	Writer(s)	Producer	Length
1.	"Come Next Monday"	K.T. Oslin; Rory Bourke; Charlie Black	Joe Scaife; Jim Cotton	3:49
2.	"Oo-Wee"	Oslin; Bourke; Black	Barry Beckett	3:11
3.	"Mary and Willie"	Oslin	Beckett	3:32
4.	"Love Is Strange"	Sylvia Robinson; Mickey Baker; Ellas Smith	Josh Leo; Larry Michael Lee; Oslin	3:49
5.	"Momma Was a Dancer"	Oslin	Scaife; Cotton	4:09
6.	"New Way Home"	Oslin	Beckett	4:07
7.	"Cornell Crawford"	Oslin; Joe Miller	Scaife; Cotton	4:45
8.	"Still on My Mind"	Oslin	Beckett	4:12
9.	"You Call Everybody Darlin'"	Sam Martin; Ben Trace; Clem Watts	Leo; Lee; Oslin	3:44
10.	"Two Hearts"	Oslin; Bourke	Leo; Lee; Oslin	3:43

== Personnel ==
Compiled from liner notes.

- Eddie Bayers - drums
- Barry Beckett - keyboards
- Richard Bennett - acoustic guitar
- John R. Crowder - bass guitar
- Bill Cuomo - keyboards
- Costo Davis - keyboards
- Owen Hale - drums
- Keith Hinton - acoustic guitar, electric guitar
- David Hungate - bass guitar
- Mike Lawler - synthesizer
- Larrie Londin - drums
- Gary Lunn - bass guitar
- Terry McMillan - harmonica
- Bobby Ogdin - keyboards
- K.T. Oslin - lead vocals, keyboards, background vocals on "Come Next Monday"
- Don Potter - acoustic guitar
- Michael Rhodes - bass guitar
- Joe Scaife - background vocals on "Come Next Monday"
- Harry Stinson - drums
- Joe Van Dyke - keyboards
- Mitch Watkins - electric guitar
- John D. Willis - acoustic guitar
- Reggie Young - electric guitar
- Dino Zimmerman - electric guitar

== Charts ==
=== Weekly charts ===
Chart (1990–1991)	Peak position
UK Country Albums (OCC)	19
US Billboard 200	76
US Top Country Albums (Billboard)	5

=== Year-end charts ===
Chart (1991)	Position
US Top Country Albums (Billboard)	18
