= Didn't Expect It to Go Down This Way =

Single by K. T. Oslin

from the album This Woman
- B-side: "Round the Clock Lovin'"
- Released: October 21, 1989
- Genre: Country
- Length: 4:01
- Label: RCA
- Songwriter: K. T. Oslin
- Producer: Harold Shedd

K. T. Oslin singles chronology
"This Woman" (1989)	"Didn't Expect It to Go Down This Way" (1989)	"Two Hearts" (1990)

"Didn't Expect It to Go Down This Way" is a song written and recorded by American country music artist K. T. Oslin. It was released in October 1989 as the fifth single from the album This Woman. The song reached #23 on the Billboard Hot Country Singles & Tracks chart.

== Chart performance ==
Chart (1989)	Peak position
US Hot Country Songs (Billboard)	23
Canadian RPM Country Tracks	27
