= Bob Vincent =

Bob Vincent (born March 7, 1918, in Detroit, Michigan – June 25, 2005, in Fullerton, California) was an American big band singer and theatrical agent.

Born Vincent John Cernuto, he started singing in bands in the 1940s. He was the featured vocalist on the song "You Call Everybody Darlin'", as recorded by Al Trace in 1948. This recording peaked at No. 1.

Vincent started his theatrical agent career by taking over Julius J. "Bookie" Levin's Mutual Entertainment agency. In 1962, Vincent relocated to Lake Tahoe, Nevada, where he became Entertainment Director of Harrah's Lake Tahoe and Reno showrooms. In 1965, having met up-and-coming singer Wayne Newton at Harrah's, Mr. Vincent moved to Los Angeles, California where he co-managed Newton's career.

Vincent started his own theatrical agency, Mus-Art Corporation Of America in 1967, and managed a wide range of musicians/artists for the next 35 years, eventually changing the company name to Main Track Productions. He also wrote and published a book, Show Business Is Two Words, in 1979. One of his children is drummer/producer Nick Vincent.

Bob Vincent died from congestive heart failure on June 25, 2005, in Fullerton, California.
