= Mary and Willie =

Single by K. T. Oslin

from the album Love in a Small Town
- B-side: "Love Is Strange"
- Released: February 16, 1991
- Genre: Country
- Length: 3:32
- Label: RCA
- Songwriter: K. T. Oslin
- Producer: Barry Beckett

K. T. Oslin singles chronology
"Come Next Monday" (1990)	"Mary and Willie" (1991)	"You Call Everybody Darling" (1991)

"Mary and Willie" (sometimes spelled "Mary and Willi") is a song written and recorded by American country music artist K. T. Oslin. It was released in February 1991 as the third single from the album Love in a Small Town. The song reached #28 on the Billboard Hot Country Singles & Tracks chart.

== Chart performance ==
Chart (1991)	Peak position
Canada Country Singles (RPM)	20
US Hot Country Songs (Billboard)	28
