= Wall of Tears (song) =

1984 country song

Song by Gus Hardin

from the album Wall of Tears
- Released: 1984
- Recorded: 1984
- Studio: The Music Mill
- Genre: Country
- Length: 3:00
- Label: RCA Victor
- Songwriters: Richard Leigh; Peter McCann
- Producer: Mark Wright

"Wall of Tears" is a song written by Richard Leigh and Peter McCann. It was originally recorded by American country music artist Gus Hardin and was the title track of her 1984 album. The song was also recorded by American country music artist K. T. Oslin. It was released on January 9, 1987 as the first single from Oslin's album 80's Ladies. The song reached #40 on the Billboard Hot Country Singles & Tracks chart.

== Background and release ==
"Wall of Tears" was co-written by Nashville songwriters, Richard Leigh and Peter McCann. Its first known version was recorded by Gus Hardin in the summer of 1984. Hardin's session took place at the Music Mill recording studio, which was located in Nashville, Tennessee. The song's recording was produced by Mark Wright. He would serve as Hardin's producer for the eventual album the song was included on. The song was eventually released as an album track following the release of the album. Hardin's album was named after the song and was never released as a single. On the original vinyl record, "Wall of Tears," was included as the second song on "side two" of the project.

== Personnel ==
All credits are adapted from the liner notes of Wall of Tears by Gus Hardin.

Musical personnel

- Eddie Bayers – drums
- Barry Beckett – piano
- Kathy Burdick – background vocals
- Kim Fleming – background vocals
- Emory Gordy, Jr. – bass
- Gus Hardin – lead vocals
- Shane Keister – synthesizer
- Dave Loggins – background vocals
- Jay Dee Manners – steel guitar
- Brent Rowan – guitar
- Jim Scaife – background vocals
- Wendy Weldman – background vocals
- Mark Wright – background vocals, producer

== K. T. Oslin version ==
"Wall of Tears"

Single by K. T. Oslin

from the album 80's Ladies
- B-side: "Two Hearts Are Better Than You"
- Released: January 9, 1987
- Studio: Music Mill
- Genre: Country; country pop
- Length: 3:45
- Label: RCA
- Songwriters: Richard Leigh; Peter McCann
- Producers: Jim Cotton; Joe Scaife

K. T. Oslin singles chronology
"Younger Men" (1982)	"Wall of Tears" (1987)	"80's Ladies" (1987)

=== Background and content ===
In 1982, K. T. Oslin had originally recorded two singles with Elektra Records, both of which were unsuccessful. She was ultimately dropped from the label, but gained a second recording contract with RCA Victor in 1986. It was at RCA that Oslin would have her biggest commercial success as a country artist. Oslin would record "Wall of Tears" in her first studio session with RCA. The session was produced by Jim Cotton and Joe Scaife. It took place at the Music Mill Studio, in October 1986. The track "Old Pictures" was also cut at the same session.

=== Release and reception ===
"Wall of Tears" was released as a single via RCA Victor Records on January 9, 1987, in North America, and on April 25, 1988, in the UK. It would be her first RCA release. It was distributed as a seven inch single, with the B-side being "Two Hearts Are Better Than You." The song spent 15 weeks on the Billboard Hot Country Songs chart between 1986 and 1987. By February 1987, the single had climbed to number 40 on the country chart. "Wall of Tears" became Oslin's second charting single and her first to break into the top 40. Her next single, "80's Ladies," would be her first major hit.

"Wall of Tears" would later be released on Oslin's debut studio album, which was also titled 80's Ladies. The album was released in 1987 and the song was the album's opening track. In discussing the album's material, Rodney Batdorf of Allmusic noted Oslin's style, which included her sound on "Wall of Tears": "K.T. Oslin established a new voice in country music — that of an upscale, middle-aged divorcee, trying to cope with the turmoils with life."

=== Track listings ===
7" vinyl single

- "Wall of Tears" – 3:40
- "Two Hearts Are Better Than You" – 4:43

=== Chart performance ===
Chart (1987)	Peak position
US Hot Country Songs (Billboard)	40

=== Personnel ===
All credits are adapted from the liner notes of 80's Ladies.

Musical personnel

- K. T. Oslin – keyboards, lead vocals, backing vocals
- David Briggs – keyboards
- Gary Prim – keyboards
- Costo Davis – synthesizer
- Bruce Dees – electric guitar
- Steve Gibson – electric guitar
- Brent Rowan – acoustic guitar, electric guitar
- Mike Brignardello – bass guitar
- Larry Paxton – bass guitar
- Eddie Bayers – drums
- Larrie Londin – drums
- James Stroud – drums
- Sam Levine – saxophone
- Terry McMillan – harmonica
- Joe Scaife – backing vocals
