= Ben Trace =

American songwriter

- Born: Benjamin Louis Feinberg; 15 October 1897
- Origin: Chicago, Illinois, U.S.
- Died: 7 July 1973 (aged 75)
- Occupation: Songwriter

Benjamin Louis Trace (né Feinberg; 15 October 1897 – 7 July 1973) was an American songwriter who, from the 1910s through the 1950s, in collaboration with his younger bandleader brother, Al, wrote lyrics to hundreds of popular songs.

== Career ==
A native of Chicago, Ben Trace wrote the songs which were primarily performed by Al Trace and His Orchestra, including their most successful recording, "You Call Everybody Darlin'", which became a #1 hit in 1948.
