= This Woman (K. T. Oslin album) =

Studio album by K. T. Oslin
- Released: August 30, 1988
- Studio: The Music Mill, Nashville
- Genre: Country
- Length: 42:02
- Label: RCA Victor
- Producer: Harold Shedd, Jim Cotton (associate producer), Joe Scaife (associate producer)

K. T. Oslin chronology
80's Ladies (1987)	This Woman (1988)	Love in a Small Town (1990)

Singles from This Woman
- 1. "Money" Released: July 1, 1988; 2. "Hold Me" Released: October 7, 1988; 3. "Hey Bobby" Released: February 3, 1989; 4. "This Woman" Released: May 26, 1989; 5. "Didn't Expect It to Go Down This Way" Released: October 6, 1989

Professional ratings
Review scores
Source	Rating
AllMusic	3/5 stars

This Woman is the second studio album by American country music artist K. T. Oslin. It was released by RCA Records on August 30, 1988, in North America, and on November 14 in the United Kingdom. "Money", "Hold Me", "Hey Bobby", the title track and "Didn't Expect It to Go Down This Way" were released as singles. The album reached No. 2 on the Top Country Albums chart and has been certified Platinum by the RIAA.

== Track listing ==
- All songs written or co-written by K. T. Oslin; co-writers in parentheses.

No.	Title	Writer(s)	Length
1.	"This Woman"		4:45
2.	"Money"		5:12
3.	"Round the Clock Lovin'"	Rory Bourke	4:04
4.	"Where Is a Woman to Go"	Jerry Gillespie	3:23
5.	"Hold Me"		4:40
6.	"Hey Bobby"		4:23
7.	"She Don't Talk Like Us No More"		3:20
8.	"Jealous"		4:47
9.	"Didn't Expect It to Go Down This Way"		4:00
10.	"Truly Blue"		3:05

== Personnel ==
Adapted from liner notes

- Acoustic Guitar: Brent Rowan
- Background Vocals: K.T. Oslin, Joe Scaife
- Bass guitar: Mike Brignardello, Larry Paxton
- Drums: Eddie Bayers, Owen Hale, James Stroud
- Electric guitar: Mitch Watkins, Brent Rowan
- Keyboards: David Briggs, K.T Oslin
- Lead Vocals: K.T. Oslin
- Percussion: Terry McMillan, Farrell Morris
- Saxophone: Jim Horn
- Synthesizer: David Briggs

== Charts ==
=== Weekly charts ===
Chart (1988–89)	Peak position
Canadian Country Albums (RPM)	4
US Billboard 200	75
US Top Country Albums (Billboard)	2

=== Year-end charts ===
Chart (1988)	Position
US Top Country Albums (Billboard)	74
Chart (1989)	Position
US Top Country Albums (Billboard)	3
Chart (1990)	Position
US Top Country Albums (Billboard)	45
