= Al Trace =

Musical artist (1900–1993)

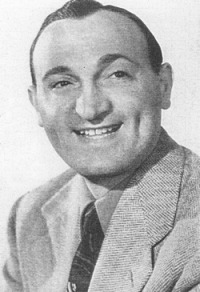
- Al Trace in 1944 advertisement

Background information
- Born: December 25, 1900; Chicago, Illinois, U.S.
- Died: August 31, 1993 (aged 92) Sun City West, Arizona, U.S.
- Genres: Big band
- Occupations: Musician, songwriter, baseball player
- Instruments: Singing, drum set
- Years active: 1920s–1975

Albert J. Trace (aka Albert Joseph Trace; né Feinberg; 25 December 1900 – 31 August 1993) was an American songwriter and orchestra leader of the 1930s, 1940s and 1950s. His popularity peaked in the Chicago area during the height of the Big Band era. He was the brother of the songwriter Ben Trace.

== Career ==
A native of Chicago, Trace played professional baseball before deciding on music as a career. His first jobs during the early 1920s included playing the drums and singing with various bands, until he formed his own band in 1933, the year in which Chicago was celebrating its centennial with a World's Fair officially known as A Century of Progress International Exposition. The band's first engagement in May 1933 was at the Fair's French pavilion and, when the Fair closed for the winter in November, he remained in Chicago, beginning a long engagement at the Blackhawk Restaurant, followed by three years at the Sherman Hotel. Starting in early 1943 and continuing during and after World War II, the Al Trace Orchestra, including the vocalists Toni Arden and Bob Vincent, were familiar regulars on the Chicago-based It Pays to Be Ignorant, one of the most popular shows of the era known as the Golden Age of Radio.

Al Trace and His Silly Symphonists was one of several comedy ensembles in the early 1940s. Others included Spike Jones and His City Slickers, the Hoosier Hot Shots and the Korn Kobblers. He drew nation attention with the novelty song "Mairzy Doats" (Hit 8079, an Eli Oberstein label), in 1944. In February 1945, radio stations introduced "Sioux City Sue", performed by Al Trace and His Silly Symphonists (National Records 5007). The song became a hit.

Trace recorded for several record companies: Hit, Mercury Records, National Records, MGM Records, Columbia Records, Damon Records, Regent Records and Chance Records. He composed over 300 songs, some alone and others as a collaborator, most frequently with his brother, Ben Trace, while also writing a considerable number of songs using the pseudonyms Clem Watts or Bob Hart. Among the Ben Trace/Al Trace collaborations was his most successful recording, "You Call Everybody Darlin'", which was a #1 hit in 1948. Another very popular song was "If I Knew You Were Comin' I'd've Baked a Cake". His other song collaborators included Al Hoffman, Bob Merrill and Abner Silver.

In 1975, shortly after his 74th birthday, he retired from active work as a songwriter and bandleader and joined with another ex-bandleader to form a booking agency in Scottsdale, Arizona.

Trace died of a stroke in Sun City West, Arizona, at the age of 92.

== Ensembles led by Trace ==
- 1944–1948: Al Trace and His Silly Symphonists
- 1948–1950: Al Trace And His New Orchestra
- 1949: Al Trace & His Flame Throwers
- 1953: Al Trace and His Orchestra
