= You Call Everybody Darlin' =

Song

"You Call Everybody Darlin'" is a popular song. The words and music were by Sam Martin (né Samuel Matzkowitz; 1908–2002), Ben Trace, and his brother, Al Trace, who used the pseudonym, Clem Watts. The song was copyrighted and published in 1946.

== Popular recordings ==
Several versions were recorded that charted in 1948 (mostly recorded that year, but at least one possibly in the previous year): by Al Trace (Clem Watts' real name; the biggest-selling version), Anne Vincent, Jack Smith, The Andrews Sisters, Jerry Wayne, and Jack Lathrop. The song was also recorded by Art Lund that year.

- The Al Trace recording was released by Regent Records as catalog number 117. The record first reached the Billboard charts on June 18, 1948, and lasted 22 weeks on the chart, peaking at #1. A separate Al Trace recording, recorded 1946 for Sterling 3023, reached #21 in Billboard's "Most Played in Juke Boxes" survey in a 3-week chart run. Bob Vincent sang lead on both versions.
- Anne Vincent (née Anne Sutherland Lloyd; 1925–1999), with a vocal quartet, recorded the song in 1948 on the Mercury label (matrix 1829; catalog no. 5155). The record first reached the Billboard charts on July 23, 1948, and lasted 12 weeks on the chart, peaking at #13.
- The Jack Smith recording was recorded about December 30, 1947, and released by Capitol Records as catalog number 15155. The record first reached the Billboard charts on August 13, 1948, and lasted 9 weeks on the chart, peaking at #13.
- The Andrews Sisters recording was recorded on July 26, 1948, and released by Decca Records as catalog number 24490. The flip side was "Underneath the Arches". The record first reached the Billboard charts on August 27, 1948, and lasted 9 weeks on the chart, peaking at #16.
- Jerry Wayne (né Jerome Marvin Krauth; 1916–1996), father of composer Jeff Wayne, recorded the song July 7, 1948. It was released on the Columbia label (catalog no. 38286; matrix: CO38955). The recording first reached the Billboard charts on September 10, 1948, and lasted 1 week on the chart, at #26.
- Jack Lathrop and the Drugstore Cowboys recorded the song in 1948 on the RCA Victor label (Cat #20-3109). The record first reached the Billboard charts on September 17, 1948, and lasted 2 weeks on the chart, peaking at #27.
- Country singer Lamar Morris revived the tune as a minor country chart song in 1973.
- American country music artist K. T. Oslin covered the song on her 1990 album, Love in a Small Town. It was the fourth single released from the project and reached #69 on the Billboard Hot Country Singles & Tracks chart.
