= Hey Bobby =

Single by K. T. Oslin

from the album This Woman
- B-side: "Where Is a Woman to Go"
- Released: February 11, 1989
- Genre: Country
- Length: 4:23
- Label: RCA
- Songwriter: K. T. Oslin
- Producer: Harold Shedd

K. T. Oslin singles chronology
"Hold Me" (1988)	"Hey Bobby" (1989)	"This Woman" (1989)

"Hey Bobby" is a song written and recorded by American country music artist K. T. Oslin. It was released in February 1989 as the third single from the album This Woman. The song reached #2 on the Billboard Hot Country Singles & Tracks chart.

== Chart performance ==
Chart (1989)	Peak position
Canada Country Singles (RPM)	1
US Hot Country Songs (Billboard)	2

=== Year-end charts ===
Chart (1989)	Position
Canada Country Tracks (RPM)	44
US Country Songs (Billboard)	46
