= Come On-a My House =

Single by Rosemary Clooney
- B-side: "Rose of the Mountain"
- Released: 1951
- Recorded: June 6, 1951
- Genre: Traditional pop; novelty
- Length: 2:02
- Label: Columbia
- Songwriters: Ross Bagdasarian, William Saroyan
- Producer: Mitch Miller

Rosemary Clooney singles chronology
"The Lady Is a Tramp" (1951)	"Come On-a My House" (1951)	"Find Me" (1951)

"Come On-a My House" is a song written by Ross Bagdasarian and William Saroyan and originally released by Rosemary Clooney in 1951. Bagdasarian and Saroyan were cousins who wrote the song while driving across New Mexico in the summer of 1939. The melody is based on an Armenian folk song, and the lyrics reference traditional Armenian customs of hospitality.

The song was first performed during a 1950 off-Broadway production of The Son. It did not, however, become a hit until the release of Clooney's recording. Saroyan was a novelist and playwright. The song was one of Bagdasarian's only successes before adopting the pen name David Seville, under which he found success with the song "Witch Doctor" and as the creator of Alvin and the Chipmunks.

== Rosemary Clooney version ==
Clooney's version of the song was the first of a number of songs she recorded which were influenced by accents or dialects. She recorded it in early 1951 with Mitch Miller leading an ensemble of four musicians including harpsichordist Stan Freeman playing the newly introduced "harpsipiano." The single reached number one on the Billboard charts for six weeks.

Clooney also sang the song in the 1953 film The Stars Are Singing.

Although she performed "Come On-a My House" for many years, Clooney later confessed that she hated the song and only recorded it because Miller threatened to fire her if she refused. In a 1988 interview, Clooney said she could hear anger in her voice from being pressured to perform a song she disliked.

== Cover versions ==
- A version was released on Coral Records at the same time as Clooney's in 1951, performed by the song's composers, Bagdasarian and Saroyan. It contains a coda that is omitted from the familiar Clooney hit: "Come on-a my house all your life/Come on, come on/Come on, come on and be my wife."
- In late 1951, MGM Records released a novelty answer record, "Where's-a Your House?", which reached #22 on the Billboard charts. Sung by Robert Q. Lewis in dialect, the tune details the singer's frustrated attempts to follow up "Rosie's" invitation.
- Mickey Katz also released a Yiddish parody of the song for Capitol Records that year.
- Eartha Kitt released a Japanese language cover version of the song in 1965.
- American country-music artist K. T. Oslin covered the song on her 2001 album, Live Close By, Visit Often. Her version reached number 40 on the Billboard Hot Dance Music/Club Play charts. It spent six weeks on the chart before peaking in June 2001. It is her only song to chart on the Dance Club songs list.
- Actress and singer Bernadette Peters covered the song playing concert hall manager Gloria Windsor in Mozart in the Jungle in 2015.
- Nasty Tales And Their Orchestra created several remixes of Della Reese's cover, one of which was used as the opening and closing theme music to The Girls Next Door reality show that aired on E!
- The Surf Punks covered it on their 1988 album "Party Bomb"

== In popular culture ==
In 1974, Sparks titled their third album Kimono My House as a pun on the song's title.

The 1978 M*A*S*H episode "Major Topper" features "Boot" Miller (Hamilton Camp) singing the song.

In 1996, an edited fast-paced version of the song was featured in commercials for the WWF In Your House video game.
