= Do Ya' =

Single by K. T. Oslin

from the album 80's Ladies
- B-side: "Lonely But Only for You"
- Released: September 11, 1987
- Genre: Country
- Length: 4:05
- Label: RCA Records
- Songwriter: K. T. Oslin
- Producer: Harold Shedd

K. T. Oslin singles chronology
"80's Ladies" (1987)	"Do Ya'" (1987)	"I'll Always Come Back" (1988)

"Do Ya'" is a song written and recorded by American country music artist K. T. Oslin. It was released on September 11, 1987 as the third single from the album 80's Ladies. The song was Oslin's third country hit and the first of four singles to hit number one on the country chart. The single went to number one for one week and spent a total of sixteen weeks on the country chart.

== Charts ==
Chart (1987)	Peak position
US Hot Country Songs (Billboard)	1
Canadian RPM Country Tracks	3
