= This Woman (K. T. Oslin song) =

Single by K. T. Oslin

from the album This Woman
- B-side: "Younger Men
- Released: June 10, 1989
- Genre: Pop
- Length: 4:53
- Label: RCA
- Songwriter: K. T. Oslin
- Producer: Harold Shedd

K. T. Oslin singles chronology
"Hey Bobby" (1989)	"This Woman" (1989)	"Didn't Expect It to Go Down This Way" (1989)

"This Woman" is a song written and recorded by American country music artist K. T. Oslin. It was released in June 1989 as the fourth single and title track from the album This Woman. The song reached #5 on the Billboard Hot Country Singles & Tracks chart.

== Chart performance ==
Chart (1989)	Peak position
Canada Country Singles (RPM)	2
US Hot Country Songs (Billboard)	5

=== Year-end charts ===
Chart (1989)	Position
Canada Country Tracks (RPM)	22
US Country Songs (Billboard)	74
