= Come Next Monday =

Single by K. T. Oslin

from the album Love in a Small Town
- B-side: "Truly Blue"
- Released: September 29, 1990
- Genre: Country
- Length: 3:49
- Label: RCA
- Songwriters: Charlie Black; Rory Bourke; K. T. Oslin
- Producers: Joe Scaife, Jim Cotton

K. T. Oslin singles chronology
"Two Hearts" (1990)	"Come Next Monday" (1990)	"Mary and Willie" (1991)

"Come Next Monday" is a song co-written by American country music singer K. T. Oslin. It was originally recorded by Judy Rodman on her 1986 album Judy.

Oslin's recording was released in September 1990 as the second single from her album Love in a Small Town. The single went to number one for two weeks and spent a total of 20 weeks on the country singles chart. It would turn out to be her final single to reach number one on that chart. Oslin wrote the song with Charlie Black and Rory Bourke.

== Critical reception ==
Lisa Smith and Cyndi Hoelzle of Gavin Report reviewed the single favorably, stating that it was "another intelligent, feeling song from a wise woman's point of view. Of course, both men and women should relate to the self-promises in this song."

== Chart performance ==
Chart (1990)	Peak position
Canada Country Singles (RPM)	1
US Hot Country Songs (Billboard)	1

=== Year-end charts ===
Chart (1990)	Position
Canada Country Tracks (RPM)	77
