= Rory Bourke =

American songwriter (1942–2026)

Background information
- Born: Rory Michael Bourke; July 14, 1942; Cleveland, Ohio, U.S.
- Died: October 10, 2026 (aged 84)
- Genre: Country
- Occupations: Songwriter, music publisher
- Website: rorybourke.com

Rory Michael Bourke (July 14, 1942 – October 10, 2026) was an American country music songwriter and music publisher.

== Life and career ==
Bourke was born on July 14, 1942, in Cleveland, Ohio, and moved to Nashville, Tennessee in 1964. He worked for a period in the promotional department of Mercury Records.

Bourke began his songwriting career in the early 1970s and wrote tracks recorded by Charlie Rich, Elvis Presley, Lynn Anderson, Billy "Crash" Craddock, Olivia Newton-John, and many others. His most successful song was "The Most Beautiful Girl", co-written with Billy Sherrill and Norro Wilson, recorded by Rich and a number-one record in both the country and pop fields. He co-wrote "Patch It Up" with Eddie Rabbitt and wrote "Your Love's Been a Long Time Coming," both of which were recorded by Elvis Presley.

Bourke's other notable songs include "A Little Good News" by Anne Murray, "You Look So Good in Love" by George Strait, "I Know a Heartache When I See One" by Jennifer Warnes, and "Come Next Monday" by K. T. Oslin. Most of his songs were written in collaboration with other songwriters. Charlie Black was a frequent writing partner to Bourke. He also wrote songs with Oslin, Mike Reid, Eddie Rabbitt, Deborah Allen, and several others.

He was inducted into the Nashville Songwriters Hall of Fame in 1989. His awards included three times as ASCAP's "Writer of the Year" (1975, 1979, 1983) and three Grammy nominations for Best Country Song. He also won eleven BMI performance awards and over 45 ASCAP performance awards.

Bourke died on October 10, 2026, at the age of 84.
