= I'll Always Come Back =

Single by K. T. Oslin

from the album 80's Ladies
- B-side: "Old Pictures"
- Released: January 8, 1988
- Genre: Country
- Length: 4:08
- Label: RCA Records
- Songwriter: K. T. Oslin
- Producer: Harold Shedd

K. T. Oslin singles chronology
"Do Ya'" (1987)	"I'll Always Come Back" (1988)	"Money" (1988)

"I'll Always Come Back" is a song written and recorded by American country music artist K. T. Oslin. It was released on January 8, 1988 as the fourth single from the album 80's Ladies. The song was Oslin's second number one on the country chart. The single went to number one for one week and spent a total of thirteen weeks on the country chart.

== Charts ==
=== Weekly charts ===
Chart (1988)	Peak position
US Hot Country Songs (Billboard)	1
Canadian RPM Country Tracks	1

=== Year-end charts ===
Chart (1988)	Position
US Hot Country Songs (Billboard)	18
