= Hold Me (K. T. Oslin song) =

Single by K. T. Oslin

from the album This Woman
- B-side: "She Don't Talk Like Us No More"
- Released: September 1988
- Genre: Country
- Length: 4:41
- Label: RCA
- Songwriter: K. T. Oslin
- Producer: Harold Shedd

K. T. Oslin singles chronology
"Money" (1988)	"Hold Me" (1988)	"Hey Bobby" (1989)

"Hold Me" is a song written and recorded by American country music artist K. T. Oslin. It was released in September 1988 as the second single from her album This Woman. The song was Oslin's third number one on the country chart. The single went to number one for one week and spent a total of 14 weeks on the country chart.

== Chart performance ==
Chart (1988–1989)	Peak position
US Hot Country Songs (Billboard)	1
Canadian RPM Country Tracks	1
