= 80's Ladies (song) =

Single by K. T. Oslin

from the album 80's Ladies
- B-side: "Old Pictures"
- Released: April 24, 1987
- Genre: Country
- Length: 4:12
- Label: RCA Records
- Songwriter: K. T. Oslin
- Producer: Harold Shedd

K. T. Oslin singles chronology
"Wall of Tears" (1987)	"80's Ladies" (1987)	"Do Ya'" (1987)

Music video
- "80's Ladies" on YouTube

"80's Ladies" is a song written and recorded by American country music artist K. T. Oslin. It was first released on April 24, 1987 in the United States, and on June 6, 1988 in the United Kingdom, as the second single and title track from Oslin's album 80's Ladies. The song reached number 7 on the Billboard Hot Country Singles & Tracks chart. It won Song of the Year at the 1988 CMA Awards.

== Critical reception ==
In 2024, Rolling Stone ranked the song at #114 on its 200 Greatest Country Songs of All Time ranking.

== Music video ==
A video for the song was released in 1988 and directed by Michael Merriman. The video starts off with a group of couples getting together at a class reunion, as Oslin's character tells a former classmate that she was going to stay the night at her friend's house, where she and a friend are watching old films on a projection screen and reminiscing about the past. The friends later drive to the cemetery, where it is revealed their longtime friend who was in the films has passed away. As they leave the cemetery, they comment on how their friend would have loved the reunion.

== Charts ==
Chart (1987)	Peak position
Canada Country Tracks (RPM)	4
US Hot Country Songs (Billboard)	7
