= K. T. Oslin =

American country music singer-songwriter (1942–2020)

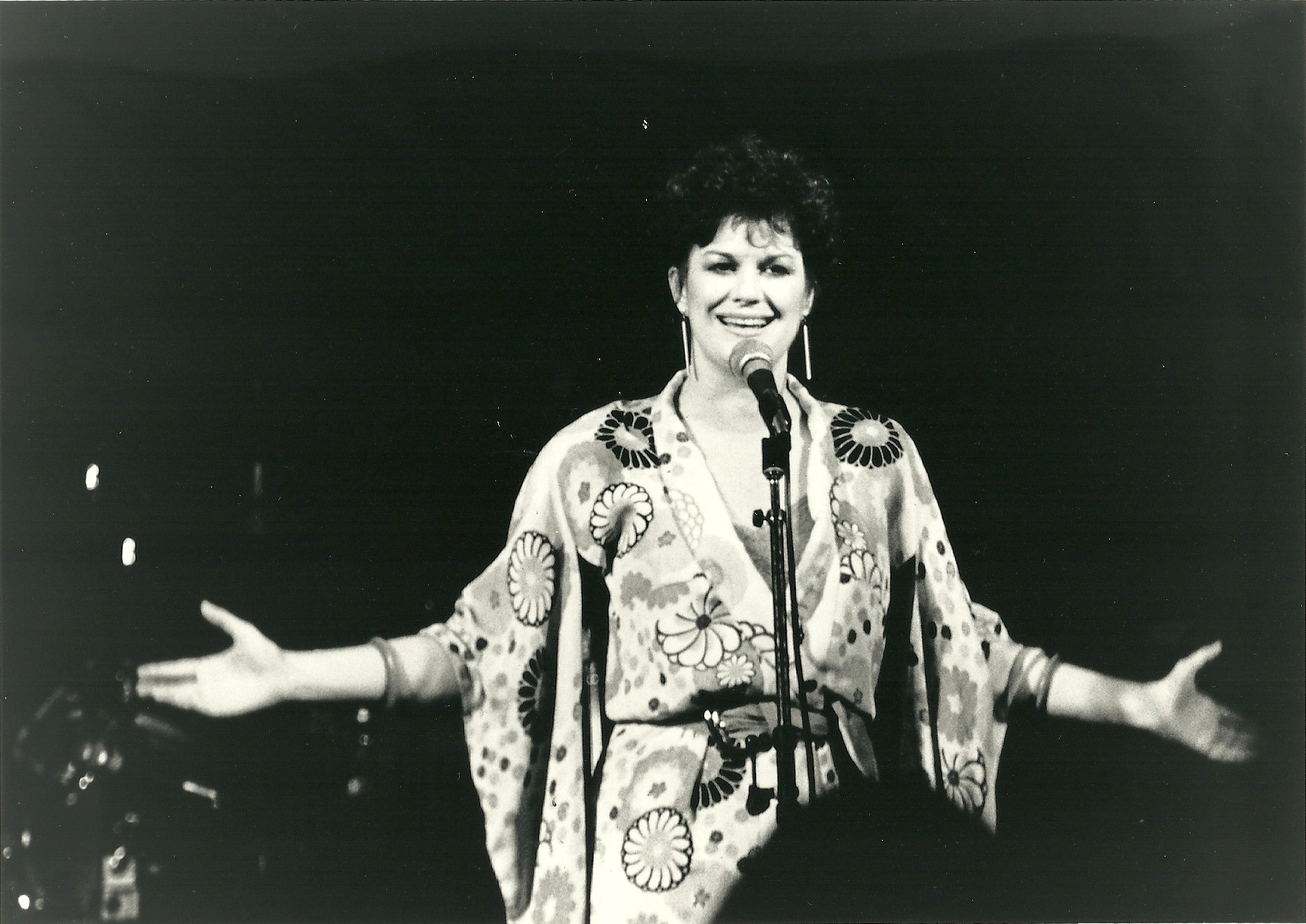
- Oslin performing in 1987
- Born: Kay Toinette Oslin; May 15, 1942; Crossett, Arkansas, U.S.
- Died: December 21, 2020 (aged 78); Nashville, Tennessee, U.S.
- Occupations: Singer; songwriter; actress; producer
- Musical career
- Genres: Country; pop rock; adult contemporary
- Instruments: Vocals; keyboards
- Years active: 1966–2015
- Labels: Elektra; RCA; BNA; Red River

Kay Toinette Oslin (May 15, 1942 – December 21, 2020) was an American country music singer-songwriter. She had several years of major commercial success in the late 1980s after signing a record deal at age 45. Oslin had four number one hits and placed additional singles on the Billboard country chart during that timespan; in addition, she won three Grammy Awards and is an inductee of the Nashville Songwriters Hall of Fame.

Oslin moved to Alabama after the death of her father, then to Texas. She developed an appreciation for folk music while studying theater in college and later started a folk trio. In 1966, she returned to theater after being cast in the touring production of Hello, Dolly! She then moved to New York City, where she continued acting in Broadway musicals and television commercials. At the same time, she began songwriting as a hobby. After a demo recording was made of her music, Oslin briefly signed to Elektra Records in 1981 without much success. She later signed to RCA Records in 1986 and had her first major hit the following year with "80's Ladies". Her 1987 debut album of the same name would sell over one million copies and produce three additional hits, including the number one single "Do Ya'".

Oslin released This Woman (1988) and Love in a Small Town (1990), which reached the top ten of the Billboard charts. The albums spawned hit singles including "Hold Me", "Hey Bobby" and "Come Next Monday". In the early 1990s, she left her recording contract and went into a hiatus following several personal setbacks. In 1996, she returned with the studio album "My Roots Are Showing..." and then in 2001 with Live Close By, Visit Often. Oslin released her final album in 2015 titled Simply.

== Early years ==
Oslin was born in Crossett, Arkansas, in 1942 to Larry and Kathleen Oslin. When Oslin was 5, her father died from leukemia, leaving her mother widowed. His death resulted in her becoming shy and withdrawn. The family moved to Mobile, Alabama, following her father's death, which is where Oslin spent her childhood. When she was a teenager, her mother moved her family to Houston, Texas, where she would eventually graduate from high school. She became fond of music during her formative years in music inspired from her mother. Oslin's mother had once performed swing music on local radio and also was offered a job singing in the Les Brown orchestra. She studied drama at Lon Morris College in Texas, where she also drew a deep appreciation for folk music.

While in college, Oslin formed a folk trio with David Jones and singer-songwriter Guy Clark. Together, they performed in local clubs, restaurants and other venues in Texas. The trio eventually recorded a song for a 1963 folk compilation titled Look, It's Us! On lead vocals, Oslin performed the tune "Brave Young Soldier". She would later form a folk duo with Frank Davis. In Hollywood, California, the pair—billed as "Frankie and Johnny"—recorded an album, which was not released. Oslin returned to Houston following the stint. In 1966, a touring production of the Broadway musical Hello, Dolly! came to the Houston area in search of "chorus girls" for their ensemble cast. Oslin auditioned, got the part and began touring the same year.

== Career ==
=== 1966–1986: Broadway, commercials and beginnings in Nashville ===
In 1966, Hello, Dolly!'s national tour ended and Oslin moved to New York City to pursue acting. She remained in the city for 20 years where she got several small stage role parts. Oslin appeared as part of the ensemble in the Broadway shows Promises, Promises and West Side Story. She also found work singing commercial jingles. She was often cast in hygiene-product commercials. In an interview with the Chicago Tribune, Oslin recalled being cast in a hemorrhoid commercial: "Hemorrhoids! Lord! I had a hemorrhoid commercial that had people I knew from the 3rd grade calling me up saying, 'Is that you?'" Oslin also developed an interest in songwriting after being given a piano. She taught herself chord patterns and wrote music that went along with it. Her interest in country music also developed after New York started their first country radio station. She found the music to be more sophisticated than what it previously had been and began writing country songs after that. While performing as part of a synthesizer troupe, Oslin was inspired to write her first country song from writing she saw on a bathroom wall. Written on the wall were the words, "I ain't gonna love nobody but Cornell Crawford." Oslin wrote the song with friend Joe Miller and she would later record it in 1990.

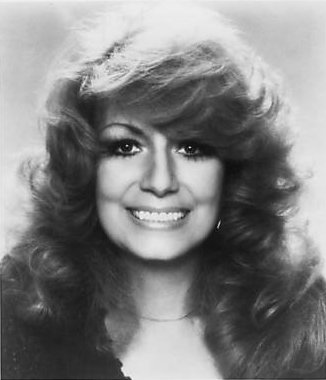
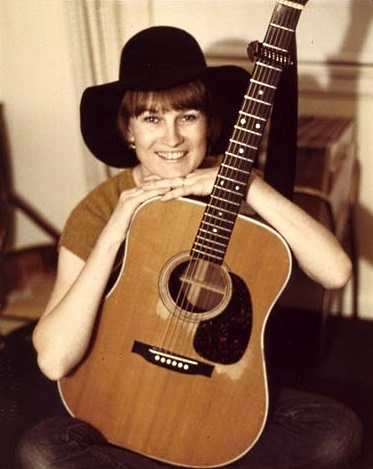
Before having success as a singer, Oslin's own compositions were recorded by country artists Dottie West (left) and Gail Davies (right)

Oslin eventually made a demonstration tape of her compositions and brought them to the attention of the performance rights group SESAC. From there, it was brought to the attention of their Nashville executive, Dianne Petty. Petty encouraged Oslin's musical talent and helped bring her music to the attention of Nashville record executives. At the same time, Oslin also found work singing with Guy Clark on his 1978 self-titled album. Through Petty's assistance, Oslin acquired a "singles-only" recording contract with Elektra Records. Only two singles were issued on the label, "Younger Men" and "Clean Your Own Tables", the latter of which became a minor hit on the country chart. "My first record, 'Clean Your Own Tables,' managed to get on the charts for about 15 minutes," she recalled in 1987. Elektra ultimately dropped her from their label in 1982. She returned to New York where she went into a depressive period and gained 40 pounds. She continued commercial work, but found it unsatisfying. Yet Petty continued advocating for Oslin and her original compositions were recorded by Judy Rodman, Dottie West, Gail Davies and The Judds.

In 1986, Oslin decided to make a final effort to regain a recording contract. She borrowed $7,000 from her aunt, lost 40 pounds, rented a Nashville nightclub and invited record executives to a one-time music showcase. "The next morning, I sat waiting for the phone to ring. It did not," she recounted. Yet, through her connections, Oslin contacted Nashville producer Harold Shedd, who had recently been successful recording Alabama. Shedd convinced Oslin to record three of her original tunes and he eventually became her full-time production collaborator. She also met RCA Records executive Joe Galante in 1986. Galante believed Oslin had potential and signed her to RCA in 1986 when Oslin was 45 years old.

=== 1987–1993: 80's Ladies and commercial breakout ===
In January 1987, RCA released Oslin's first label single, titled "Wall of Tears". Despite breaking into the top 40, the song failed to become a major hit. In April, the label issued the self-penned "80's Ladies", which became her first major hit. Oslin had written the tune several years prior in small chunks over time. "I thought it was one of those show pieces. I never dreamed or thought it would be a single," she stated in 2011. The single peaked at number seven on the Billboard Hot Country Songs chart in July and went to number four on the RPM Country Singles chart in Canada. It would later win the Grammy Award for Best Female Country Vocal Performance and Song of the Year at the Country Music Association Awards. Oslin became the CMA's first female artist to win the Song of the Year accolade. "80's Ladies" also received a positive response from critics. Steve Huey of Allmusic called the track "anthemic," while Mary Bufwack and Robert K. Oermann called it "the anthem of a generation." Bill Friskics-Warren of The New York Times compared its piano sound to that of Jackson Browne. On June 30, 1987, Oslin's debut studio album of the same name was released on RCA. It became the highest-charting album by a female country artist in 20 years, topping the Billboard Top Country Albums chart in February 1988. It was also her highest-charting release on the Billboard 200 reaching a peak of 68 in March 1988. It would later certify platinum in the United States for selling over one million copies. Both of the follow-up singles to "80's Ladies" ("Do Ya'" and "I'll Always Come Back") reached number one on the country chart.

"80's Ladies"
Oslin had her first hit single at age 45 with the song, "80's Ladies". It won several awards, spawned an album, and helped establish a commercially-successful recording career.

Oslin's musical success allowed her to become more financially stable. By 1988, she purchased her first house, but was rarely home due to a demanding tour schedule. That year, she toured with Alabama and George Strait, and recorded her second album for RCA. In August 1988, This Woman was released. Oslin wrote (or co-wrote) all ten of the album's tracks. According to Oslin, This Woman reflected the modern thinking of middle-aged women of the eighties. The project received critical acclaim from various publications. Alex Henderson of Allmusic gave it a three-star rating, calling it "a generally appealing release that successfully balances commercial and artistic considerations." Rolling Stone named it one of their "12 Classic Albums" in 2018 and found it to define female independence. Rock critic Robert Christgau gave the album a "B" rating, praising the album's defiance of gender roles in the Nashville establishment. It produced the number one hit, "Hold Me", which would also win her a second Grammy award. It was followed by the top five hits, "Hey Bobby" and its title track.

Oslin had continued success into the 1990s. That year, she performed at Carnegie Hall alongside new singer Clint Black, who also served as the opening act of her newly established headlining tour. However, her constant road schedule was negatively affecting her mental health. She took several months off from appearances to refocus and readjust her mental health. "It took me months to become a human," she told the Chicago Tribune in 1990. Oslin also took time to write and record her third studio album. In late 1990, Love in a Small Town was released on RCA Records. The project peaked at number five on the Billboard country albums chart and spent 71 weeks there. Despite the album's first single becoming only a minor hit, the second single, "Come Next Monday", would be her fourth number one single on the country chart. It was followed by the top 40 hit, "Mary and Willie", and the charting singles "You Call Everybody Darling" and "Cornell Crawford".

Oslin spent more time away from music as the decade progressed. Her last album project for RCA would be the 1993 compilation, Greatest Hits: Songs from an Aging Sex Bomb. The compilation peaked at number 28 on the Top Country Albums list and number 126 on the Billboard 200. Along with eight of her major hits, Greatest Hits also included three new songs. Notably included was a re-recording of "New Way Home". It was later released as single and spent three weeks on the Billboard country chart. Jack Hurst of The Chicago Tribune found its new tracks to be "pop sounding" but also found it to blend effectively with her previous hits. Allmusic's Rick Anderson rated it four out of five stars, yet also observed it to have pop inflections. However, he found the quality of the writing and sound to be quite high: "This is great pop music, no matter what bin you find it in."

=== 1993–2015: Acting transition, hiatus and return to the spotlight ===
Oslin began turning her career towards acting by 1994. This began with a guest appearance on the television western, Paradise. Oslin portrayed a mother living in rural America and performed the song, "Down in the Valley". She would also appear on a television special with Carol Burnett where she performed a duet version of her song, "New Way Home". In 1993, Oslin made her first appearance in a film called The Thing Called Love. She starred alongside Hollywood actors Sandra Bullock and River Phoenix. Directed by Peter Bogdanovich, the film's plot focused on Nashville and the main character's dream of becoming a country music songwriter. Oslin portrayed Lucy, a fictional owner of the Bluebird Café. Reviewers, including The Austin Chronicle, disliked the movie, but praised Oslin's performance. "She's so country and so good in her role, she reveals the rest of the movie to be as artificial as it is," Louis Black wrote in 1993. Also in 1993, Oslin appeared in the television movie, Poisoned by Love: The Kern County Murders. In 1994, she guest-starred in the Arkansas-themed series Evening Shade. Oslin portrayed one of three sisters headed to audition for the Grand Ole Opry.

Oslin would also take several years away from music during the mid 1990s. She faced several personal setbacks including a severe depression, side effects from menopause and quadruple bypass surgery. Following her recovery, Oslin was coaxed back into recording from former label-head Joe Galante. Teaming up with sound engineer Rick Will, she produced and recorded 1996's "My Roots Are Showing...", which was released on BNA Records. The album contained cover versions of lesser-known country and pop recordings. It was received unfavorably by Allmusic, which only rated it 2.5 stars. Bill Carpenter commented that "The only issue is that this was marketed as a country album when the Nashville element isn't terribly conspicuous." However, Robert K. Oermann of Music Row commented that the album showcased how Oslin was an example of the "emerging Americana music movement." "My Roots Are Showing..." reached number 45 on the Billboard country albums chart and spawned the charting single, "Silver Tongue and Gold Plated Lies".

After another hiatus, Oslin released her fifth studio album titled, Live Close By, Visit Often, in 2001. She co-produced the album with The Mavericks' lead vocalist Raul Malo. The album included a range of musical styles, such as country, electronic dance and Latin. Live Close By, Visit Often received mixed reviews. Allmusic's Maria Konicki Dinoia commented that the project was "too eclectic to call country [and] too divergent to call pop." Alanna Nash found the album to be "schizophrenic" in its musical diversity, but did praise Oslin's vocal performance throughout. Live Close By, Visit Often spent 11 weeks on the Billboard country albums list and peaked at number 35, becoming her final charting album. Its title track was released as the first single and reached a minor chart position on the country songs list. Its second single, a cover of Rosemary Clooney's "Come on-a My House" would make the Billboard dance music chart.

Oslin went into a third career hiatus after 2001. Speaking to Country Music Television in 2011, she explained that the decision to stop performing was conscious. "I asked my people, 'Do I have enough money to quit right now?' and they said, 'Yeah.' I said, 'Well, then, I quit!'" She spent frequent time at home and enjoying hobbies, such as painting. In 2008, she performed a one-woman show, which included a music and words. In 2013, she returned to the stage to perform at the Franklin Theater for the twenty-fifth anniversary of her studio album, 80's Ladies. In 2014, Oslin performed a live cabaret show, which would inspire the recording of her final studio album. In 2015, Simply was released on Red River Entertainment. The album contained re-recordings of her previous material and one new track titled, "Do You Think About Me". Simply contained a session band that consisted of only four players. According to a 2015 interview, Oslin stated she decided to make the album so that fans could buy new music at her shows. Oslin went into her final retirement following the record's release.

== Musical styles ==
In a 1988 interview, Oslin described her own musical style as stemming from country, southern blues and R&B: "It's a mishmash of stuff. I'm surprised people like it. They should be asking: 'What is this stuff?' I ask that myself all the time." Oslin's musical style is rooted in country, but also incorporates elements of country pop, pop rock and adult contemporary. Examples of pop and "anthemic rock" can be found in her first two RCA albums, as noted by Steve Huey of Allmusic. When reviewing 1988's This Woman, Allmusic's Alex Henderson also drew similar comparisons, calling her sound "far from a honky tonker." Oslin incorporated more dance, traditional pop, Latin and Americana into her musical style after leaving RCA.

Her musical style can also be identified with her songwriting. As a musical artist, Oslin wrote most of her material. Many of her compositions centered on characters going through the trials and tribulations of middle age. According to Oslin, she developed songwriting inspiration from her friends who were going through martial difficulties. "I learn from watching people and try to put it in terms that music fans would find interesting," she explained in 1988. Bill Friskics-Warren of The New York Times wrote that Oslin "gave voice to the desires and trials of female baby boomers on the cusp of middle age." In Finding Her Voice: The History of Women in Country Music, Oslin "became the beacon of inspiration for every middle-aged woman who felt vibrant yet overlooked." Dennis Hunt of The Los Angeles Times called her writing "penetrating, vivid tales of women in turmoil."

Oslin was largely influenced as a child by traditional pop and country performers, notably Patsy Cline and Kay Starr. As she started performing folk music in the 1960s, Oslin's musical inspiration drew away from country and pop. Yet, once writing her own music, Oslin began finding connections back into country music despite not necessarily looking for it: "I was writing songs--country songs for some weird reason--even though I didn't want to be a songwriter," she commented.

== Legacy and honors ==
Oslin's success helped give identity to strong women in their middle-aged years, according to several publications. Sarah Trahern, CEO of the Country Music Association remarked on her legacy in 2020: "K.T. Oslin had one of the most soulful voices in country music and was a strong influence for women with her hit '80's Ladies'...She truly had one of the best voices in the history of our format." Lorrie Morgan made a similar comment in 2020: "She was a big inspiration to me and her writing about the strength of women." Her artistry helped influence other female country singer–songwriters that followed such as Brandy Clark and Chely Wright. Mary Bufwack and Robert K. Oermann commented on her musical legacy in 2003: "K. T. was part of a 1980s invasion of female songwriting talent into Nashville. Today, virtually every major song publisher in [Music City] has female staff writers."

Oslin was part of a group of country artists who helped shift its musical sound in the late 1980s. Writers and critics have cited her as an innovator of Nashville's musical shift, along with Steve Earle, k. d. lang and Lyle Lovett. Bill Friskics-Warren of The New York Times commented that Oslin was "among a distinguished circle of thoughtful, independent female songwriting contemporaries that included Pam Tillis, Gretchen Peters and Matraca Berg." Oslin also received several honors for her legacy. In 2014, she was inducted into the Texas Songwriters Hall of Fame. In 2018, she was inducted into the Nashville Songwriters Hall of Fame.

== Personal life and death ==
Oslin never married. However, she did have several long-term relationships through her middle age. This included a several-year relationship in the 1970s with Alan Rubin, a musician and former member of The Blues Brothers. The couple lived for two years in upstate New York in a rural community. The relationship dissolved after two years and Oslin moved back to New York City. It was Rubin who gave Oslin her first piano following their separation. Oslin would dive into songwriting following her breakup: "That pulling back period is when I started to write." Oslin later dated record producer Steve Buckingham and drummer Owen Hale. However, these relationships eventually ended. "I'm alone, but I like my own company," she told People magazine in 1993.

In the early 1990s, Oslin revealed a battle with menopausal depression, which caused her to lose interest in creating music, songwriting, and performing. According to Oslin, she returned to normalcy after she stopped taking hormones prescribed by her doctor. Oslin's mother died around the same period, which caused further depressive episodes. In 1995, she began suffering from chest pain after a routine lawn mowing, and after several examinations, it was discovered that she needed quadruple bypass surgery. Although she made a full recovery, she had a permanent triangular scar that she refused to remove from promotional photographs.

In June 2015, Oslin was diagnosed with Parkinson's disease and moved into an assisted-living facility the following year. She died on December 21, 2020, in Nashville, a week after being diagnosed with COVID-19 during the pandemic in Tennessee. She was 78 years old. She was interred at Woodlawn Memorial Park in Nashville adjacent to fellow country music star Tammy Wynette.

== Discography ==
Studio albums

- 1987: 80's Ladies
- 1988: This Woman
- 1990: Love in a Small Town
- 1996: "My Roots Are Showing..."
- 2001: Live Close By, Visit Often
- 2015: Simply

== Filmography ==
Film and television appearances by K. T. Oslin
Title	Year	Role	Notes	Ref.
Paradise	1990	Lenore		
Carol & Company	1991	Various sketch characters		
Poisoned by Love: The Kern County Murders	1993	Candy	television film	
The Thing Called Love	1993	Lucy		
Evening Shade	1994	Loleen Elldridge		

== Awards and nominations ==
Year	Nominee / work	Award	Result	Ref.
1982	SESAC	Most Promising Country Music Writer	Won	
1987	Grammy Awards	Best Female Country Vocal Performance – "80's Ladies"	Won	
1987	Grammy Awards	Best Country Song – "80's Ladies"	Nominated	
1987	Academy of Country Music Awards	Song of the Year – "80's Ladies"	Nominated	
1987	Academy of Country Music Awards	Country Music Video of the Year – "80's Ladies"	Won	
1987	Academy of Country Music Awards	Top New Female Vocalist	Won	
1988	Grammy Awards	Best Country Song – "Hold Me"	Won	
1988	Grammy Awards	Best Female Country Vocal Performance – "Hold Me"	Won	
1988	Academy of Country Music Awards	Album of the Year – This Woman	Won	
1988	Academy of Country Music Awards	Country Music Video of the Year – "Hold Me"	Nominated	
1988	Academy of Country Music Awards	Country Music Video of the Year – "I'll Always Come Back"	Nominated	
1988	Academy of Country Music Awards	Single Record of the Year – "I'll Always Come Back"	Nominated	
1988	Academy of Country Music Awards	Top Female Vocalist	Won	
1988	Country Music Association Awards	Horizon Award	Nominated	
1988	Country Music Association Awards	Female Vocalist of the Year	Won	
1988	Country Music Association Awards	Single of the Year – "Do Ya'"	Nominated	
1988	Country Music Association Awards	Song of the Year – "80's Ladies"	Won	
1988	Country Music Association Awards	Song of the Year – "Do Ya'"	Nominated	
1990	Grammy Awards	Best Country Song – "Come Next Monday"	Nominated	
1990	Grammy Awards	Best Female Country Vocal Performance – "Come Next Monday"	Nominated	
1990	Academy of Country Music Awards	Country Music Video of the Year – "Come Next Monday"	Nominated	
1991	Academy of Country Music Awards	Country Music Video of the Year – "Mary and Willie"	Nominated	
1991	Country Music Association Awards	Music Video of the Year – "Come Next Monday'	Nominated	
1991	SESAC	Writer of the Year	Nominated	
1991	SESAC	National Performance Activity – "Come Next Monday"	Won	
1991	SESAC	National Performance Activity – "Mary and Willie"	Won	
1991	SESAC	National Performance Activity – "Younger Men"	Won	
2014	Texas Songwriters Hall of Fame	Inducted as a member	Won	
2018	Nashville Songwriters Hall of Fame	Inducted as a member	Won	
