= Harold Shedd =

American singer-songwriter (born 1931)

- Born: James Harold Shedd; November 8, 1931 (age 94)
- Origin: Bremen, Georgia, U.S.
- Genres: Country, rock
- Occupations: producer, industry executive
- Years active: 1958–present
- Labels: RCA; Mercury Polygram Records Nashville

James Harold Shedd (born November 8, 1931) is an American music industry executive and record producer best known for his role as producer of the country group Alabama as well as Reba McEntire, Shania Twain and Toby Keith. During his career, he has headed Mercury Records and Mercury's sister label, Polydor.

== Honors ==
In the city limits of Bremen, Georgia, U.S. Route 27 is formally known as “Harold Shedd Highway”

== Life and work ==
Born November 8, 1931, Shedd began work in his hometown of Bremen, Georgia, where he was a member of a local band and worked in radio for fourteen years as DJ, engineer, sales manager and finally station owner. In 1972, he sold up and moved to Nashville, where, by 1979, he was co-owner of the Music Mill recording studio. Harold and business partner Donnie Canada built a new building in 1982.

Shedd was instrumental in Alabama, one of the first acts he worked with, being signed by RCA. The band's debut single 'Tennessee River' was the first of Alabama's 21 consecutive number one hits that he produced.

Shedd also produced albums for Amie Comeaux, Roger Miller, Mel Tillis, Louise Mandrell, Dobie Gray, K. T. Oslin, Glen Campbell and Willie Nelson. While Reba McEntire had had top 10 singles, it was only with her collaboration with Shedd that she saw her first gold record, 1984's My Kind of Country album, although the pair came into conflict over his suggestions for songs and "the sweetened arrangements he imposed on them".

In 1988, Shedd joined Mercury Polygram Records Nashville, where over the next six years, he oversaw the signing of Kentucky Headhunters, Shania Twain, Billy Ray Cyrus, and Toby Keith. In 1989, Shedd was inducted into the Georgia Music Hall of Fame.

After a period as President of Polydor Nashville, The Music Mill recording studio became the headquarters of VFR Records, owned by Shedd with partners Paul Lucks and Ed Arnold, for a time one of Nashville's more successful independent country labels, whose artists included Mark McGuinn and Trent Summar & The New Row Mob. VFR folded in 2002 due to a lack of funding.
