= Highway 101 discography =

- Studio albums: 8
- Compilation albums: 1
- Singles: 17

American country music band Highway 101 has released eight studio albums and seventeen singles. The band's first release was the 1986 single "Some Find Love", which was withdrawn due to the band members disliking its sound. Highway 101 charted for the first time in late 1986 with "The Bed You Made for Me", the first of seventeen chart entries for them on Billboard Hot Country Songs. Overall, the band went to number one on that chart four times, with "Somewhere Tonight", "Cry, Cry, Cry", "(Do You Love Me) Just Say Yes", and "Who's Lonely Now".

== Discography ==
=== Studio albums ===
Title	Album details	Peak positions	Certifications
Title	Album details	US Country	Certifications
Highway 101	Release date: 1987; Label: Warner Bros. Records	7	US: Gold
101²	Release date: 1988; Label: Warner Bros. Records	8	
Paint the Town	Release date: 1989; Label: Warner Bros. Records	22	
Bing Bang Boom	Release date: 1991; Label: Warner Bros. Records	36	
The New Frontier	Release date: October 19, 1993; Label: Liberty Records	—	
Reunited	Release date: February 20, 1996; Label: Intersound Records	—	
Big Sky	Release date: May 9, 2000; Label: FreeFalls Records	—	
Christmas on Highway 101	Release date: November 22, 2010; Label: Keytone Records	—	
"—" denotes releases that did not chart

=== Compilation albums ===
Title	Album details	Peak positions
Title	Album details	US Country
Greatest Hits	Release date: September 11, 1990; Label: Warner Bros. Records	27
Latest & Greatest	Release date: February 25, 1997; Label: Intersound	—
Country Classics	Release date: October 10, 2003; Label: Flashback/Rhino	—
10 All Time Greatest	Release date: October 19, 2004; Label: Intersound	—
Rhino HiFive: Highway 101	Release date: April 24, 2007; Label: Rhino	—
"—" denotes releases that did not chart

=== Singles ===
Year	Single	Peak chart positions		Album
Year	Single	US Country	CAN Country	Album
1986	"Some Find Love"	—	—	—N/a
1986	"The Bed You Made for Me"	4	8	Highway 101
1987	"Whiskey, If You Were a Woman"	2	1	Highway 101
1987	"Somewhere Tonight"	1	1	Highway 101
1988	"Cry, Cry, Cry"	1	1	Highway 101
1988	"(Do You Love Me) Just Say Yes"	1	1	101²
1988	"All the Reasons Why"	5	2	101²
1989	"Setting Me Up"	7	4	101²
1989	"Honky Tonk Heart"	6	5	101²
1989	"Who's Lonely Now"	1	1	Paint the Town
1990	"Walkin', Talkin', Cryin', Barely Beatin' Broken Heart"	4	5	Paint the Town
1990	"This Side of Goodbye"	11	9	Paint the Town
1990	"Someone Else's Trouble Now"	14	11	Greatest Hits
1991	"Bing Bang Boom"	14	27	Bing Bang Boom
1991	"The Blame"	31	27	Bing Bang Boom
1992	"Baby, I'm Missing You"	22	18	Bing Bang Boom
1992	"Honky Tonk Baby"	54	26	Bing Bang Boom
1993	"You Baby You"	67	—	The New Frontier
1994	"Who's Gonna Love You"	—	—	The New Frontier
1996	"Where'd You Get Your Cheatin' From"	—	—	Reunited
1996	"It Must Be Love"	—	—	Reunited
1997	"I Just Don't Love the Man"	—	—	Latest and Greatest
2011	"Six Gold Coins"	—	—	Christmas on Highway 101
"—" denotes releases that did not chart

=== Guest singles ===
Year	Single	Artist	Peak positions	Album
Year	Single	Artist	US Country	Album
1990	"Tomorrow's World"	Various artists	74	Single only

=== Music videos ===
Year	Video	Director
1988	"Cry, Cry, Cry"	Claude Borenzwerg
1989	"Honky Tonk Heart"	Michael Merriman
1989	"Who's Lonely Now"	Michael Merriman
1990	"Walkin', Talkin', Cryin', Barely Beatin' Broken Heart"	Michael Merriman
1991	"Bing Bang Boom"	Gerry Wenner
1991	"The Blame"	
1991	"Honky Tonk Baby"	
1993	"You Baby You"	Steven T. Miller/R. Brad Murano
1996	"Where'd You Get Your Cheatin' From?"	
1996	"It Must Be Love"	Tom Bevins
2010	"Six Gold Coins"	Michael Davis

== See also ==
- Paulette Carlson#Discography
- Nikki Nelson#Discography
