= Greatest Hits (Highway 101 album) =

Greatest hits album by Highway 101
- Released: 1990
- Genre: Country
- Label: Warner Brothers Records
- Producer: Paul Worley and Ed Seay

Highway 101 chronology
Paint the Town (1989)	Greatest Hits (1990)	Bing Bang Boom (1991)

Singles from Greatest Hits
- 1. "Someone Else's Trouble Now" Released: September 1990

Professional ratings
Review scores
Source	Rating
Allmusic -	4/5 stars

Greatest Hits is the first compilation album by American country music band Highway 101. This compilation of their previous hits also included two new songs: "Someone Else's Trouble Now" and "The Change." The rest of the album was filled with four songs from Highway 101, and two songs each from Highway 101² and Paint the Town.

== Track listing ==
No.	Title	Writer(s)	Length
1.	"The Bed You Made for Me"	Paulette Carlson	3:29
2.	"Who's Lonely Now"	Kix Brooks, Don Cook	3:23
3.	"Whiskey, If You Were a Woman"	Mary W. Francis, Johnny MacRae, Bob Morrison	3:02
4.	"Somewhere Tonight"	Harlan Howard, Rodney Crowell	3:16
5.	"Someone Else's Trouble Now"	Pam Tillis, Gary Nicholson	3:17
6.	"Cry, Cry, Cry"	John Scott Sherrill, Don Devaney	2:28
7.	"This Side of Goodbye"	Michael Noble, Jeff Pennig, Scott "Cactus" Moser	4:01
8.	"(Do You Love Me) Just Say Yes"	Bob DiPiero, John Scott Sherrill, Dennis Robbins	3:42
9.	"Honky Tonk Heart"	Jim Photoglo, Russell Smith	3:19
10.	"The Change"	Rick Giles, Steve Bogard	4:01

== Chart performance ==
=== Album ===
Chart (1990)	Peak position
U.S. Billboard Top Country Albums	27

=== Singles ===
Year	Single	Peak positions	
Year	Single	US Country	CAN Country
1990	"Someone Else's Trouble Now"	14	11
