= List of RPM number-one country singles of 1988 =

These are the Canadian number-one country songs of 1988, per the RPM Country Tracks chart.

| Issue date | Title | Artist | Ref. |
|---|---|---|---|
| January 16 | Somewhere Tonight | Highway 101 | |
| January 23 | I Can't Get Close Enough | Exile | |
| January 30 | One Friend | Dan Seals | |
| February 6 | Where Do the Nights Go | Ronnie Milsap | |
| February 13 | Wheels | Restless Heart | |
| February 20 | Tennessee Flat Top Box | Rosanne Cash | |
| February 27 | Twinkle, Twinkle Lucky Star | Merle Haggard | |
| March 5 | Face to Face | Alabama | |
| March 12 | Too Gone Too Long | Randy Travis | |
| March 19 | This Missin' You Heart of Mine | Sawyer Brown | |
| March 26 | This Missin' You Heart of Mine | Sawyer Brown | |
| April 2 | Life Turned Her That Way | Ricky Van Shelton | |
| April 9 | Love Will Find Its Way to You | Reba McEntire | |
| April 16 | Famous Last Words of a Fool | George Strait | |
| April 23 | I Wanna Dance with You | Eddie Rabbitt | |
| April 30 | I'll Always Come Back | K. T. Oslin | |
| May 7 | It's Such a Small World | Rodney Crowell with Rosanne Cash | |
| May 14 | I'm Gonna Get You | Eddy Raven | |
| May 21 | Cry, Cry, Cry | Highway 101 | |
| May 28 | Baby I'm Yours | Steve Wariner | |
| June 4 | Eighteen Wheels and a Dozen Roses | Kathy Mattea | |
| June 11 | I Told You So | Randy Travis | |
| June 18 | I Told You So | Randy Travis | |
| June 25 | I Told You So | Randy Travis | |
| July 2 | If You Change Your Mind | Rosanne Cash | |
| July 9 | He's Back and I'm Blue | The Desert Rose Band | |
| July 16 | Fallin' Again | Alabama | |
| July 23 | Til I Find My Love | Family Brown | |
| July 30 | Talkin' to the Wrong Man | Michael Martin Murphey with Ryan Murphey | |
| August 6 | Don't We All Have the Right | Ricky Van Shelton | |
| August 13 | The Wanderer | Eddie Rabbitt | |
| August 20 | The Wanderer | Eddie Rabbitt | |
| August 27 | Give a Little Love | The Judds | |
| September 3 | Addicted | Dan Seals | |
| September 10 | Addicted | Dan Seals | |
| September 17 | I Couldn't Leave You If I Tried | Rodney Crowell | |
| September 24 | (Do You Love Me) Just Say Yes | Highway 101 | |
| October 1 | Joe Knows How to Live | Eddy Raven | |
| October 8 | I Should Be with You | Steve Wariner | |
| October 15 | We Believe in Happy Endings | Earl Thomas Conley with Emmylou Harris | |
| October 22 | Honky Tonk Moon | Randy Travis | |
| October 29 | Streets of Bakersfield | Dwight Yoakam with Buck Owens | |
| November 5 | Gonna Take a Lot of River | The Oak Ridge Boys | |
| November 12 | Darlene | T. Graham Brown | |
| November 19 | New Shade of Blue | Southern Pacific | |
| November 26 | I'll Leave This World Loving You | Ricky Van Shelton | |
| December 3 | I've Been Lookin' | The Nitty Gritty Dirt Band | |
| December 10 | I Know How He Feels | Reba McEntire | |
| December 17 | When You Say Nothing at All | Keith Whitley | |
| December 24 | If You Ain't Lovin' (You Ain't Livin') | George Strait | |

== See also ==
- 1988 in music
- List of number-one country singles of 1988 (U.S.)
