= List of Hot Country Singles number ones of 1988 =

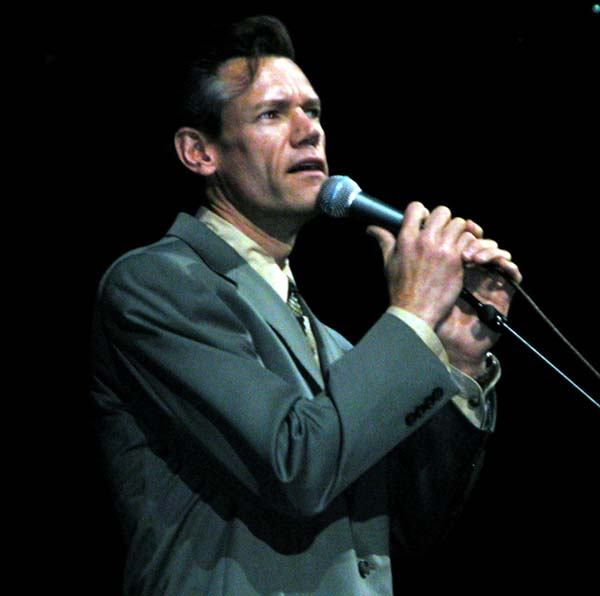
Randy Travis spent four weeks at number one in 1988.

Hot Country Songs is a chart that ranks the top-performing country music songs in the United States, published by Billboard magazine. In 1988, 49 different songs topped the chart, then published under the title Hot Country Singles, in 53 issues of the magazine, based on playlists submitted by country music radio stations and sales reports submitted by stores.

Only four songs spent more than a single week at number one in 1988: "Eighteen Wheels and a Dozen Roses" by Kathy Mattea, "I Told You So" by Randy Travis, "I'll Leave This World Loving You" by Ricky Van Shelton and "When You Say Nothing at All" by Keith Whitley. Travis and Shelton each scored two other number ones during the year to give them a total of four weeks in the top spot. This figure was matched by Rosanne Cash, who achieved three solo number ones and one in collaboration with her then-husband Rodney Crowell, making her the only artist to take four different songs to number one in 1988. Highway 101, Restless Heart, George Strait and Tanya Tucker each topped the chart with three different songs.

Artists to achieve their first chart-topper in 1988 included Dwight Yoakam, who reached number one with "Streets of Bakersfield", performed as a duet with Buck Owens, who had himself had a hit with the song fifteen years earlier. The song marked the veteran singer's first appearance at number one since 1972. The Desert Rose Band achieved the first of its two number ones with "He's Back and I'm Blue", and Paul Overstreet made his first appearance at number one when he collaborated with Tanya Tucker and Paul Davis on "I Won't Take Less Than Your Love". Overstreet achieved intermittent success as a singer but is better known as a songwriter, having written hit songs for many artists. At the other end of the scale, Merle Haggard topped the chart for the 38th and final time with "Twinkle, Twinkle Lucky Star". At the time of Haggard's death in 2016, only Conway Twitty (40) and George Strait (44) had taken more songs to the top of the Hot Country chart since Billboard began compiling sales and airplay into a single listing in 1958. Whitley's "When You Say Nothing at All" was the final number one of the year. Whitley was at the peak of his commercial success at the time, but would die less than six months later, on May 9, 1989.

== Chart history ==
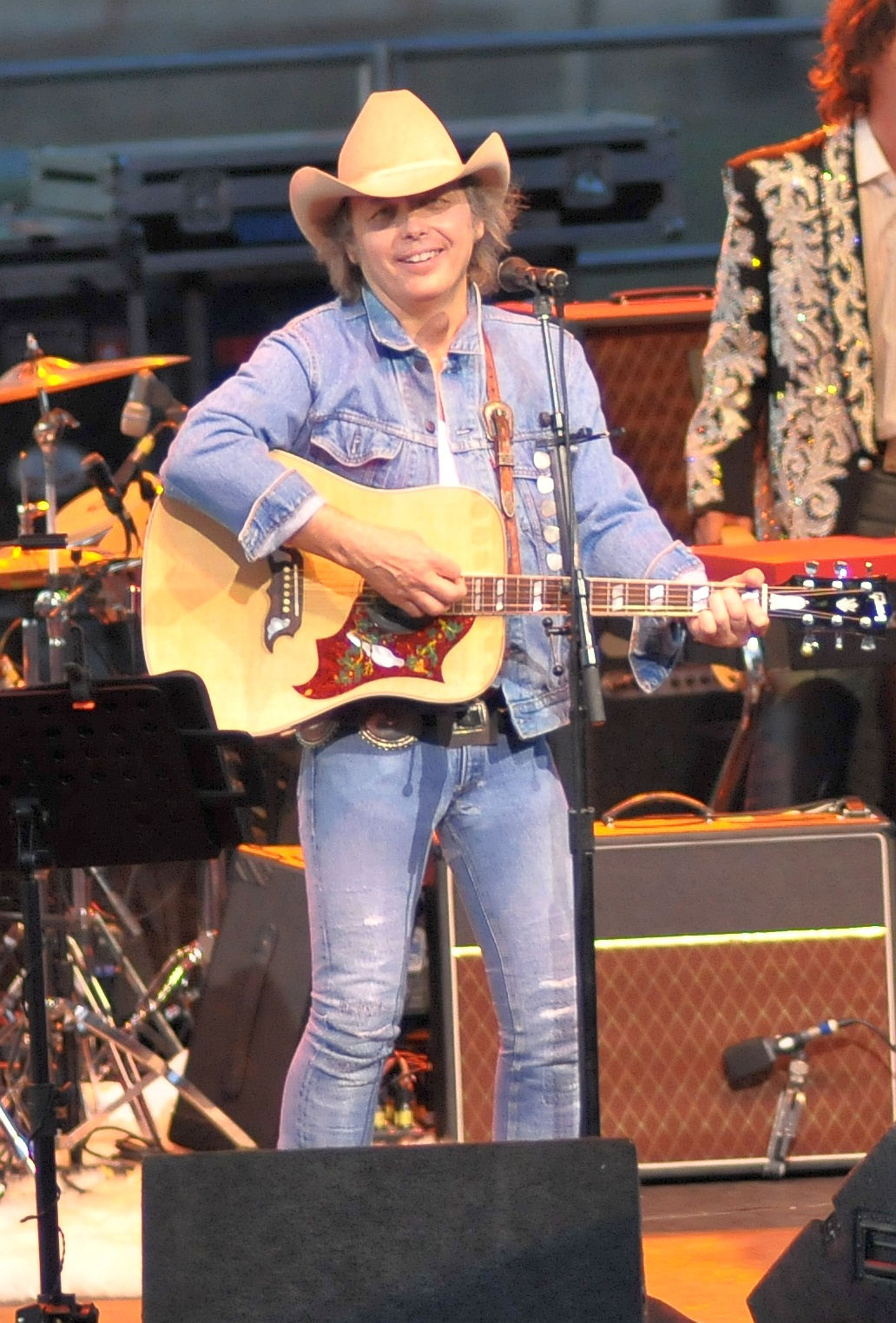
Dwight Yoakam topped the chart for the first time with "Streets of Bakersfield", a collaboration with Buck Owens.

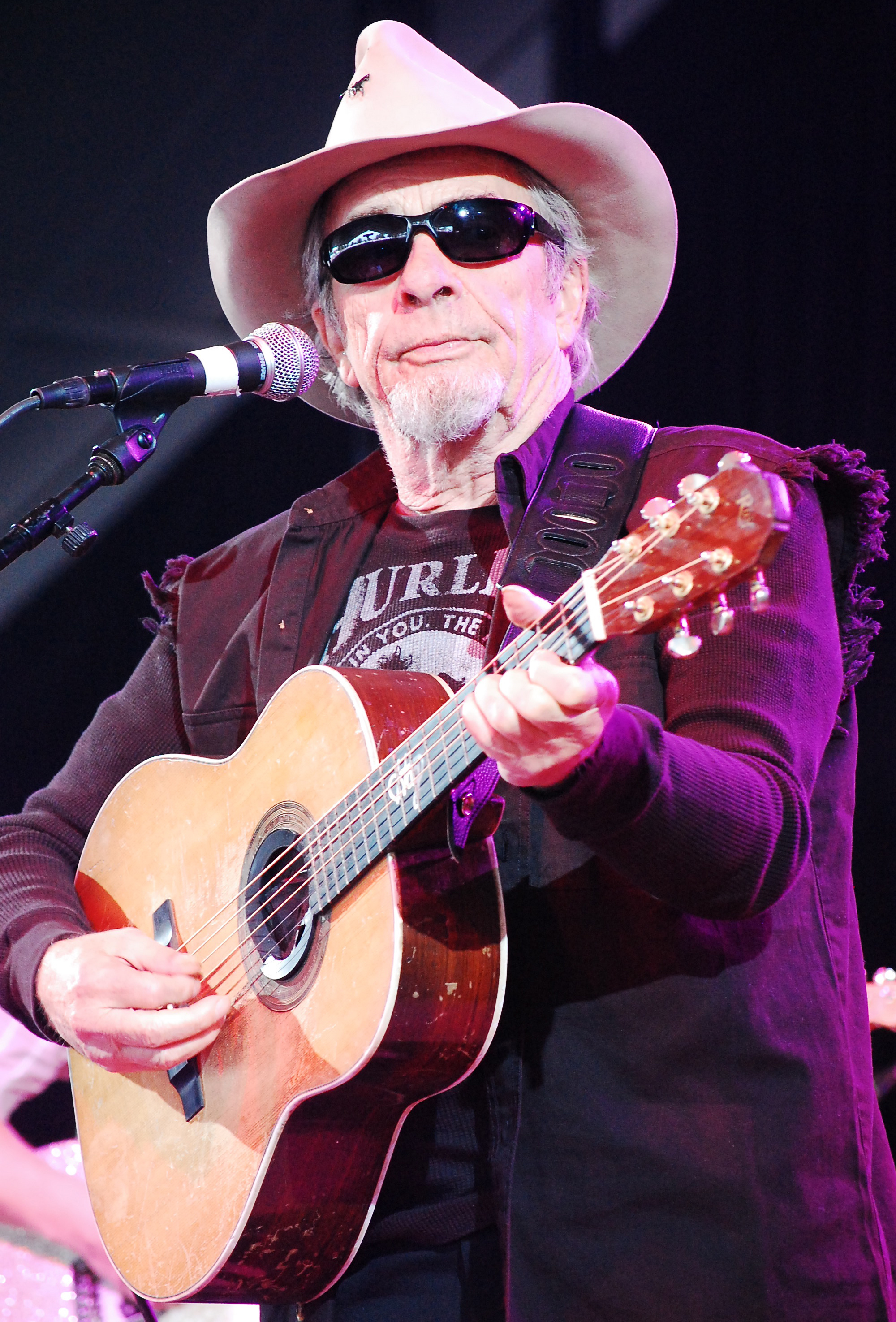
Merle Haggard (pictured in 2009) scored his 38th and final number one in 1988. At the time of his death, only two artists had topped the chart more times since Billboard launched a combined country chart in 1958.

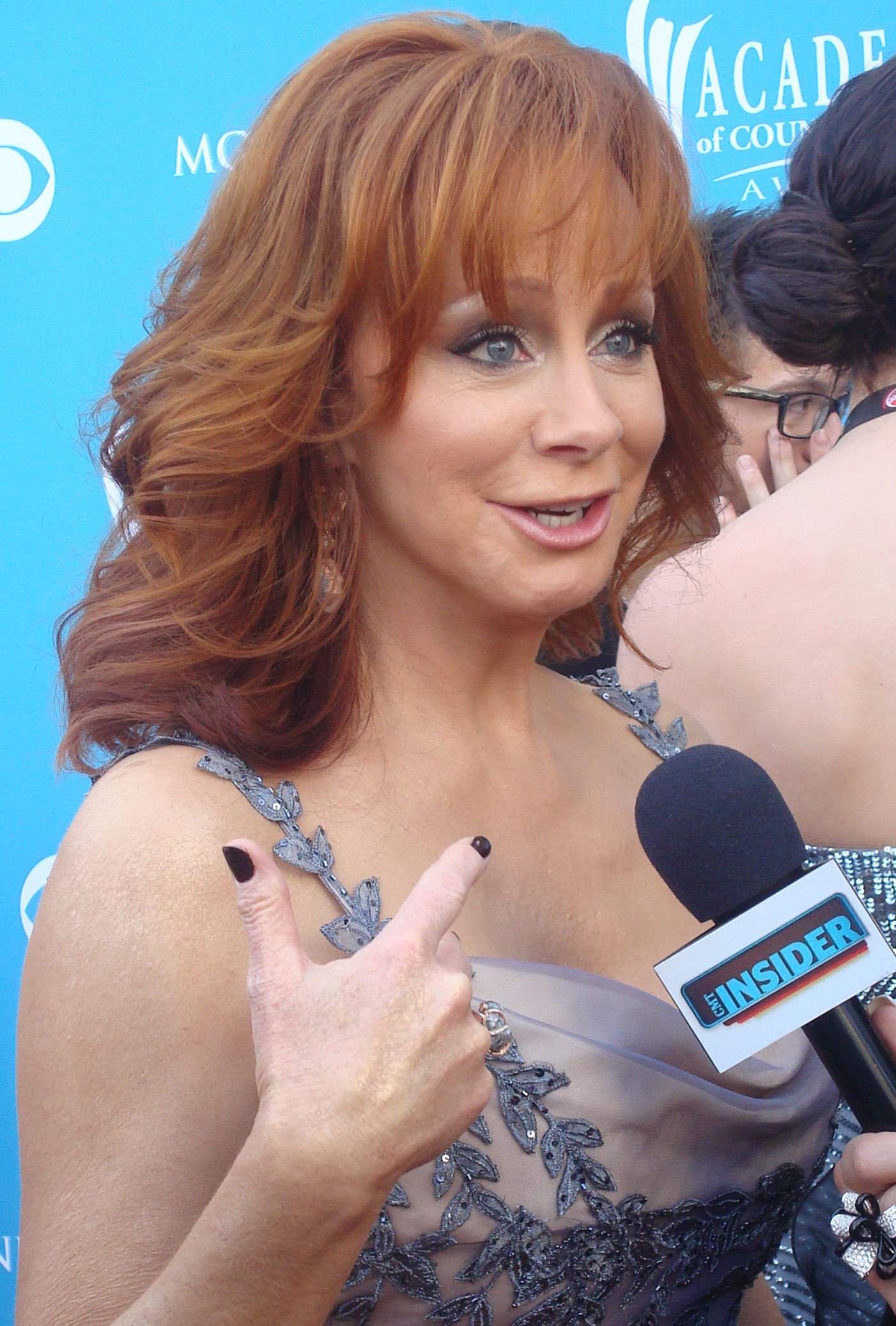
Reba McEntire took two songs to number one in 1988.

Issue date	Title	Artist(s)	Ref.
January 2	"Somewhere Tonight"	Highway 101	
January 9	"I Can't Get Close Enough"	Exile	
January 16	"One Friend"	Dan Seals	
January 23	"Where Do the Nights Go"	Ronnie Milsap	
January 30	"Goin' Gone"	Kathy Mattea	
February 6	"Wheels"	Restless Heart	
February 13	"Tennessee Flat Top Box"	Rosanne Cash	
February 20	"Twinkle, Twinkle Lucky Star"	Merle Haggard	
February 27	"I Won't Take Less Than Your Love"	Tanya Tucker with Paul Davis and Paul Overstreet	
March 5	"Face to Face"	Alabama	
March 12	"Too Gone Too Long"	Randy Travis	
March 19	"Life Turned Her That Way"	Ricky Van Shelton	
March 26	"Turn It Loose"	The Judds	
April 2	"Love Will Find Its Way to You"	Reba McEntire	
April 9	"Famous Last Words of a Fool"	George Strait	
April 16	"I Wanna Dance with You"	Eddie Rabbitt	
April 23	"I'll Always Come Back"	K. T. Oslin	
April 30	"It's Such a Small World"	Rodney Crowell and Rosanne Cash	
May 7	"Cry, Cry, Cry"	Highway 101	
May 14	"I'm Gonna Get You"	Eddy Raven	
May 21	"Eighteen Wheels and a Dozen Roses"	Kathy Mattea	
May 28	"Eighteen Wheels and a Dozen Roses"	Kathy Mattea	
June 4	"What She Is (Is a Woman in Love)"	Earl Thomas Conley	
June 11	"I Told You So"	Randy Travis	
June 18	"I Told You So"	Randy Travis	
June 25	"He's Back and I'm Blue"	The Desert Rose Band	
July 2	"If It Don't Come Easy"	Tanya Tucker	
July 9	"Fallin' Again"	Alabama	
July 16	"If You Change Your Mind"	Rosanne Cash	
July 23	"Set 'Em Up Joe"	Vern Gosdin	
July 30	"Don't We All Have the Right"	Ricky Van Shelton	
August 6	"Baby Blue"	George Strait	
August 13	"Don't Close Your Eyes"	Keith Whitley	
August 20	"Bluest Eyes in Texas"	Restless Heart	
August 27	"The Wanderer"	Eddie Rabbitt	
September 3	"I Couldn't Leave You If I Tried"	Rodney Crowell	
September 10	"(Do You Love Me) Just Say Yes"	Highway 101	
September 17	"Joe Knows How to Live"	Eddy Raven	
September 24	"Addicted"	Dan Seals	
October 1	"We Believe in Happy Endings"	Earl Thomas Conley with Emmylou Harris	
October 8	"Honky Tonk Moon"	Randy Travis	
October 15	"Streets of Bakersfield"	Dwight Yoakam & Buck Owens	
October 22	"Strong Enough to Bend"	Tanya Tucker	
October 29	"Gonna Take a Lot of River"	The Oak Ridge Boys	
November 5	"Darlene"	T. Graham Brown	
November 12	"Runaway Train"	Rosanne Cash	
November 19	"I'll Leave This World Loving You"	Ricky Van Shelton	
November 26	"I'll Leave This World Loving You"	Ricky Van Shelton	
December 3	"I Know How He Feels"	Reba McEntire	
December 10	"If You Ain't Lovin' (You Ain't Livin')"	George Strait	
December 17	"A Tender Lie"	Restless Heart	
December 24	"When You Say Nothing at All"	Keith Whitley	
December 31	"When You Say Nothing at All"	Keith Whitley	

== See also ==
- 1988 in music
- List of artists who reached number one on the U.S. country chart
