= Reunited (Highway 101 album) =

Studio album by Highway 101
- Released: February 20, 1996
- Recorded: 1986–1995
- Genre: Country
- Label: Intersound
- Producer: Larry Butler; Ed Seay; Paul Worley

Highway 101 chronology
The New Frontier (1993)	Reunited (1996)	Latest & Greatest (1997)

Professional ratings
Review scores
Source	Rating
Allmusic -	3/5 stars

Reunited is an album released in 1996 by Highway 101. The album's title refers to the return of the band's original lead singer, Paulette Carlson, to the lineup. At the time, drummer Cactus Moser was not included in the lineup.

Included on it are four of the band's earlier singles, "The Bed You Made for Me", "Setting Me Up", "All the Reason Why" and "Walkin', Talkin', Cryin', Barely Beatin' Broken Heart". Two singles were released from the album, "Where'd You Get Your Cheatin' From" and "It Must Be Love."

Tracks 2, 5, 8, and 9 were produced by Paul Worley and Ed Seay, with Larry Butler producing the rest.

== Track listing ==
1. "Where'd You Get Your Cheatin' From" (Paulette Carlson, Tom Shapiro, Chris Waters) — 3:10
2. "The Bed You Made for Me" (Carlson) — 3:26
3. "Holdin' On" (Christy Seamans, Curtis Stone) — 3:17
4. "Hearts on the Run" (Larry Butler, Jeff Sauls, Susan Sauls) — 3:53
5. "Setting Me Up" (Mark Knopfler) — 3:49
6. "She Don't Have the Heart to Love You" (Carlson) — 4:39
7. "Texas Girl" (Carlson, Gene Nelson, Jeff Pennig) — 3:04
8. "All the Reasons Why" (Carlson, Beth Nielsen Chapman) — 3:37
9. "Walkin', Talkin', Cryin', Barely Beatin' Broken Heart" (Roger Miller, Justin Tubb) — 2:34
10. "I've Got Your Number" (Tony Haselden, Harold Shedd) — 2:53
11. "It Must Be Love" (Stone, Debi Cochran) — 3:32
12. "Have You Ever Really Loved a Woman" (Bryan Adams, Michael Kamen, Robert John "Mutt" Lange) — 5:43

== Personnel ==
=== Highway 101 ===
- Paulette Carlson — vocals
- Jack Daniels — acoustic guitar, electric guitar, percussion, vocals
- Curtis Stone — bass guitar, mandolin, vocals

=== Additional musicians ===
- Larry Butler — keyboards
- Larry Byrom — acoustic guitar, electric guitar
- Pete Bordinelli — acoustic guitar, gut string guitar, mandolin
- Gary Morse — pedal steel guitar, Dobro
- Bobby Ogdin — keyboards
- John Wesley Ryles — background vocals
- Tommy Spurlock — pedal steel guitar
- Steve Turner — drums

=== Technical ===
- Larry Butler — production (tracks 1, 3, 4, 6, 7, 10–12)
- Joe Costa — recording assistant
- Tom Harding — additional recording
- Ed Seay — production (tracks 2, 5, 8, 9)
- Billy Sherrill — mixing
- Paul Worley — production (tracks 2, 5, 8, 9)
