= Bing Bang Boom =

Studio album by Highway 101
- Released: May 28, 1991
- Recorded: The SoundShop, The Money Pit and Javelina West, Nashville, TN
- Genre: Country
- Length: 34:56
- Label: Warner Bros.
- Producer: Paul Worley and Ed Seay

Highway 101 chronology
| Greatest Hits (1990) | Bing Bang Boom (1991) | The New Frontier (1993) |

Singles from Paint the Town
- 1. "Bing Bang Boom" Released: April 1991; 2. "The Blame" Released: September 14, 1991; 3. "Baby, I'm Missing You" Released: January 11, 1992; 4. "Honky Tonk Baby" Released: May 1992

Professional ratings
Review scores
| Source | Rating |
|---|---|
| Allmusic - | 2/5 stars |

Bing Bang Boom is the fourth studio album by American country music band Highway 101, released in 1991. It was the band's first release following the departure of original lead singer Paulette Carlson, with Nikki Nelson on lead vocals. The album's title track was its first single, reaching #14 on the Hot Country Singles & Tracks charts. After it came "The Blame" at #31, "Baby, I'm Missing You" at #22, and "Honky Tonk Baby" at #54.

== Track listing ==
| No. | Title | Writer(s) | Length |
|---|---|---|---|
| 1. | "Bing Bang Boom" | Hugh Prestwood | 2:29 |
| 2. | "Wherever You Are" | Mike Henderson, Mark Irwin | 3:19 |
| 3. | "The Blame" | Scott "Cactus" Moser, Paul Nelson, Gene Nelson | 3:46 |
| 4. | "Storm of Love" | Moser, Gary Chapman, Michael James | 3:01 |
| 5. | "'Til I Get It Right" | Red Lane, Larry Henley | 3:59 |
| 6. | "Restless Kind" | Henderson | 3:40 |
| 7. | "Honky Tonk Baby" | Henderson, Irwin | 2:56 |
| 8. | "River of Tears" | Curtis Stone, Eric Silver | 2:46 |
| 9. | "Baby, I'm Missing You" | Steve Seskin, Nancy Montgomery | 2:53 |
| 10. | "Desperate" | Curtis Stone, Randy Boudreaux, Sam Hogin | 2:45 |
| 11. | "Big City Bound" | Joy Lynn White, Herb McCullough | 3:08 |

== Personnel ==
=== Highway 101 ===
- Jack Daniels – electric guitar, background vocals
- Cactus Moser – drums, background vocals
- Nikki Nelson – rhythm guitar, lead vocals
- Curtis Stone – bass guitar, background vocals

=== Additional musicians ===
- Buddy Emmons – pedal steel guitar
- Dave Flint – acoustic guitar
- John Hobbs – piano
- Bill Hullett – mandolin
- John "Skink" Noreen – pedal steel guitar, lap steel guitar
- Tommy Spurlock – electric Dobro, pedal steel guitar
- Harry Stinson – background vocals
- Dennis Wilson – background vocals
- Paul Worley – acoustic guitar

String section on "Till I Get It Right" by The A-Strings, conducted by Conni Ellisor, arranged by Bergen White.

== Chart performance ==
=== Album ===
| Chart (1991) | Peak position |
|---|---|
| U.S. Billboard Top Country Albums | 36 |

=== Singles ===
| Year | Single | Peak positions | |
| Year | Single | US Country | CAN Country |
|---|---|---|---|
| 1991 | "Bing Bang Boom" | 14 | 27 |
| 1991 | "The Blame" | 31 | 27 |
| 1991 | "Baby, I'm Missing You" | 22 | 18 |
| 1992 | "Honky Tonk Baby" | 54 | 26 |
