= Paint the Town =

Studio album by Highway 101
- Released: September 26, 1989
- Genre: Country
- Length: 33:24
- Label: Warner Bros.
- Producer: Paul Worley, Ed Seay

Highway 101 chronology
101² (1988)	Paint the Town (1989)	Greatest Hits (1990)

Singles from Paint the Town
- 1. "Who's Lonely Now" Released: September 1989; 2. "Walkin', Talkin', Cryin', Barely Beatin' Broken Heart" Released: January 1990; 3. "This Side of Goodbye" Released: May 26, 1990

Professional ratings
Review scores
Source	Rating
Allmusic -	3/5 stars

Paint the Town is the third studio album by American country music band Highway 101. The last of their albums featuring Paulette Carlson as lead vocalist, it included the Billboard Country #1 "Who's Lonely Now," the #4 "Walkin', Talkin', Cryin', Barely Beatin' Broken Heart," and the #11 "This Side of Goodbye." Also included on the album is a cover of James Taylor's "Sweet Baby James". "Rough and Tumble Heart" was later recorded by Pam Tillis on her 1992 album Homeward Looking Angel.

== Track listing ==
No.	Title	Writer(s)	Length
1.	"I Can't Love You Baby"	Tommy Rocco, Kerry Chater, Jesse Read	3:33
2.	"If Love Had a Heart"	Matraca Berg, Curtis Stone	3:02
3.	"While You Slept Last Night"	Pam Tillis, Dennis Adkins	2:44
4.	"This Side of Goodbye"	Michael Noble, Jeff Pennig, Scott "Cactus" Moser	4:03
5.	"Walkin', Talkin', Cryin', Barely Beatin' Broken Heart"	Roger Miller, Justin Tubb	2:33
6.	"I'll Paint the Town"	Gretchen Peters	2:53
7.	"Rough and Tumble Heart"	Tillis, Bob DiPiero, Sam Hogin	3:41
8.	"Midnight Angel"	Bill Anthony, Bob Morrison	3:21
9.	"Who's Lonely Now"	Kix Brooks, Don Cook	3:25
10.	"Sweet Baby James"	James Taylor	4:00

== Personnel ==
=== Highway 101 ===
- Paulette Carlson - lead vocals, acoustic guitar
- Jack Daniels - background vocals, electric guitar, acoustic guitar, six string bass
- Cactus Moser - background vocals, drums, acoustic guitar
- Curtis Stone - background vocals, four string bass, harmonica

=== Additional Musicians ===
- Dennis Burnside - Piano
- Larry Byrom - Acoustic guitar, Electric guitar
- Sharon Eaves - Background Vocals
- Steve Fishell - Steel guitar
- John Hobbs - Piano
- John Barlow Jarvis - Piano
- Greg Leisz - Steel guitar
- Mike Poole - Percussion
- Harry Stinson - Background Vocals
- Dennis Wilson - Background Vocals
- Curtis Young - Background Vocals

== Charts ==
=== Weekly charts ===
Chart (1989)	Peak position
US Top Country Albums (Billboard)	22

=== Year-end charts ===
Chart (1990)	Position
US Top Country Albums (Billboard)	59

=== Singles ===
Year	Single	Peak positions	
Year	Single	US Country	CAN Country
1989	"Who's Lonely Now"	1	1
1990	"Walkin', Talkin', Cryin', Barely Beatin' Broken Heart"	4	5
1990	"This Side of Goodbye"	11	9
