= Someone Else's Trouble Now =

Single by Highway 101

from the album Greatest Hits
- B-side: "The Bed You Made for Me"
- Released: September 1990
- Genre: Country
- Length: 3:17
- Label: Warner Bros.
- Songwriters: Pam Tillis; Gary Nicholson
- Producers: Paul Worley; Ed Seay

Highway 101 singles chronology
"This Side of Goodbye" (1990)	"Someone Else's Trouble Now" (1990)	"Bing Bang Boom" (1991)

"Someone Else's Trouble Now" is a song written by Pam Tillis and Gary Nicholson, and recorded by American country music band Highway 101. It was released in September 1990 as the only single from their Greatest Hits compilation album. The song reached number 14 on the Billboard Hot Country Singles & Tracks chart in December 1990.

== Chart performance ==
Chart (1990)	Peak position
Canada Country Singles (RPM)	11
US Hot Country Songs (Billboard)	14
