= 27th Academy of Country Music Awards =

US music awards ceremony in 1992

- Date: April 29, 1992
- Location: Universal Amphitheatre, Los Angeles, California
- Hosted by: Travis Tritt; Clint Black; Lorrie Morgan

Highlights
- Most wins: Garth Brooks; Alan Jackson; Billy Dean; Reba McEntire; Brooks & Dunn (2 each)
- Most nominations: Garth Brooks (7)

Television/radio coverage
- Network: NBC

The 27th Academy of Country Music Awards was held on April 29, 1992, at the Universal Amphitheatre, in Los Angeles, California . The ceremony was hosted by Clint Black, Lorrie Morgan, and Travis Tritt.

== Winners and nominees ==
Winners are shown in bold.

Entertainer of the Year	Album of the Year
**Garth Brooks**; Clint Black; Alan Jackson; Reba McEntire; Randy Travis	**Don't Rock the Jukebox — Alan Jackson**; Backroads — Ricky Van Shelton; It's All About to Change — Travis Tritt; No Fences — Garth Brooks; Ropin' the Wind — Garth Brooks
Top Female Vocalist of the Year	Top Male Vocalist of the Year
**Reba McEntire**; Mary Chapin Carpenter; Lorrie Morgan; Pam Tillis; Tanya Tucker	**Garth Brooks**; Clint Black; Alan Jackson; Vince Gill; Doug Stone
Top Vocal Group of the Year	Top Vocal Duo of the Year
**Diamond Rio**; Alabama; Highway 101; The Kentucky Headhunters; Shenandoah	**Brooks & Dunn**; The Judds; Dolly Parton and Ricky Van Shelton; Roy Rogers and Clint Black; Travis Tritt and Marty Stuart
Single Record of the Year	Song of the Year
"**Don't Rock the Jukebox**" — **Alan Jackson**; "Here's a Quarter (Call Someone Who Cares)" — Travis Tritt; "Shameless" — Garth Brooks; "She's in Love with the Boy" — Trisha Yearwood; "Where Are You Now" — Clint Black	"**Somewhere in My Broken Heart**" — **Billy Dean, Richard Leigh**; "Don't Rock the Jukebox" — Alan Jackson, Roger Murrah, Keith Stegall; "Down at the Twist and Shout" — Mary Chapin Carpenter; "Here's a Quarter (Call Someone Who Cares)" — Travis Tritt; "Pocket Full of Gold" — Vince Gill, Brian Allsmiller
Top New Male Vocalist	Top New Female Vocalist
**Billy Dean**; Mark Chesnutt; Joe Diffie	**Trisha Yearwood**; Paulette Carlson; Ronna Reeves
Top New Vocal Duo or Group	Video of the Year
**Brooks & Dunn**; Diamond Rio; McBride & the Ride	**"Is There Life Out There"** — **Reba McEntire**; "Anymore" — Travis Tritt; "Brotherly Love" — Keith Whitley and Earl Thomas Conley; "Mary and Willie" — K.T. Oslin; "The Thunder Rolls" — Garth Brooks
Pioneer Award
**Willie Nelson**

== Performers ==
Performer(s)	Song(s)
Travis Tritt; Joe Pesci	"Bible Belt"
Paulette Carlson; Ronna Reeves; Trisha Yearwood	Top New Female Vocalist Medley "Not with My Heart You Don't" "What If You're Wrong" "The Woman Before Me"
Reba McEntire	"The Greatest Man I Never Knew"
Brooks & Dunn; Diamond Rio; McBride & the Ride	Top New Vocal Duo or Group Medley "Brand New Man" "Meet in the Middle" "Sacred Ground"
Garth Brooks	"The River"
Alabama	"Hats Off"
Lorrie Morgan	"Something in Red"
Mark Chesnutt; Billy Dean; Joe Diffie	Top New Male Vocalist Medley "Old Flames Have New Names" "Billy the Kid" "Ships That Don't Come In"
Alan Jackson	"Midnight in Montgomery"
Clint Black	"A Change in the Air"

== Presenters ==
Presenter(s)	Notes
Wynonna Judd; Marty Stuart	Single Record of the Year
Aaron Tippin; Lisa Hartman Black	Top New Female Vocalist
Lee Greenwood; T. Graham Brown; Carolyn Sapp	Top Vocal Group of the Year
Nikki Nelson; John Anderson; Pam Tillis	Top Vocal Duo of the Year
Mickey Gilley; Leeza Gibbons	Album of the Year
Kris Kristofferson	Presented Pioneer Award to Willie Nelson
Marie Osmond; Pirates of the Mississippi	Top New Vocal Duo or Group
Lee Horsley; Randy Travis	Top Female Vocalist of the Year
Lorianne Crook; Charlie Chase; Holly Dunn	Video of the Year
Mary Chapin Carpenter; Suzy Bogguss	Top New Male Vocalist
Mark Miller; Tanya Tucker; Jeff Dunham & Walter	Song of the Year
Sela Ward; Roger Miller	Top Male Vocalist of the Year
Delta Burke; Buck Owens	Entertainer of the Year
