= Bing Bang Boom (song) =

Single by Highway 101

from the album Bing Bang Boom
- B-side: "Baby, I'm Missing You"
- Released: April 1991
- Genre: Country
- Length: 2:29
- Label: Warner Bros.
- Songwriter: Hugh Prestwood
- Producers: Paul Worley; Ed Seay

Highway 101 singles chronology
"Someone Else's Trouble Now" (1990)	"Bing Bang Boom" (1991)	"The Blame" (1991)

"Bing Bang Boom" is a song written by Hugh Prestwood, and recorded by American country music band Highway 101. It was released in April 1991 as the first single and title track from their album of the same name. The song reached No. 14 on the Billboard Hot Country Singles & Tracks chart in June 1991.

== Music video ==
The music video was co-directed by Gerry Wenner and Michael Salomon, and premiered in 1991.

== Chart performance ==
Chart (1991)	Peak position
Canada Country Singles (RPM)	26
US Hot Country Songs (Billboard)	14
