= Highway 101 (album) =

Studio album by Highway 101
- Released: July 7, 1987
- Recorded: 1986
- Genre: Country
- Length: 33:10
- Label: Warner Bros.
- Producer: Paul Worley

Highway 101 chronology
Highway 101 (1987)	101² (1988)

Singles from Highway 101
- 1. "The Bed You Made for Me" Released: January 5, 1987; 2. "Whiskey, If You Were a Woman" Released: May 23, 1987; 3. "Somewhere Tonight" Released: September 21, 1987; 4. "Cry, Cry, Cry" Released: January 1988

Professional ratings
Review scores
Source	Rating
Allmusic -	4/5 stars

Highway 101 is the self-titled debut studio album by American country music band Highway 101. It saw the group shoot straight to the top of the country music charts with two singles hitting the #1 spot on the Billboard Country charts, another rising to #2, and a fourth song at #4. The album itself was a #7 Country album. The #1 hits were "Somewhere Tonight" and "Cry, Cry, Cry." Also, "Whiskey, If You Were a Woman" rose to #2, and "The Bed You Made for Me" did almost as well, reaching #4. Track 4, "Woman Walk the Line" was redone by country singer Trisha Yearwood for her sophomore effort, released in 1992.

== Track listing ==
No.	Title	Writer(s)	Length
1.	"Whiskey, If You Were a Woman"	Mary W. Francis, Johnny MacRae, Bob Morrison	3:00
2.	"Bridge Across Forever"	Matraca Berg, Ronnie Samoset	3:11
3.	"Somewhere Tonight"	Harlan Howard, Rodney Crowell	3:15
4.	"Woman Walk the Line"	Emmylou Harris, Paul Kennerley	4:06
5.	"Good Goodbye"	Paulette Carlson, Bob DiPiero, Pat McManus	3:09
6.	"Cry, Cry, Cry"	John Scott Sherrill, Don Devaney	2:28
7.	"Are You Still Mine"	Carlson	3:30
8.	"One Step Closer"	Scott "Cactus" Moser, Curtis Stone	2:55
9.	"Someone Believed"	Johnny Pierce, Joanne Christy, Paul Solomon	3:44
10.	"The Bed You Made for Me"	Carlson	3:28

== Charts ==
=== Weekly charts ===
Chart (1987)	Peak position
US Top Country Albums (Billboard)	7

=== Year-end charts ===
Chart (1988)	Position
US Top Country Albums (Billboard)	39
Chart (1988)	Position
US Top Country Albums (Billboard)	14

=== Singles ===
Year	Single	Peak positions	
Year	Single	US Country	CAN Country
1987	"The Bed You Made for Me"	4	8
1987	"Whiskey, If You Were a Woman"	2	1
1987	"Somewhere Tonight"	1	1
1988	"Cry, Cry, Cry"	1	1

== Personnel ==
=== Highway 101 ===
- Paulette Carlson – lead vocals, acoustic guitar
- Cactus Moser – drums, background vocals
- Curtis Stone – bass guitar, background vocals
- Jack Daniels – electric guitar, background vocals

=== Additional musicians ===
- Larry Byrom – acoustic guitar, electric guitar
- Dennis Burnside – piano
- John Hobbs – piano
- Jay Dee Maness – steel guitar
- Tommy Spurlock – steel guitar
- Harry Stinson – background vocals
- Dennis Wilson – background vocals
- Paul Worley – electric guitar
- Curtis Young – background vocals
