= John Kilzer =

American rock singer-songwriter (1957–2019)

John Turner Kilzer (January 7, 1957 – March 12, 2019) was an American rock singer and songwriter. Most notably, he is known for the 1988 Mainstream Rock hit "Red Blue Jeans".

== Life and career ==
Kilzer was born in Jackson, Tennessee. He had some success as a basketball player at Memphis State University, now the University of Memphis. In 1987, Kilzer signed to Geffen Records and recorded the studio album Memory in the Making. In 1988, the album charted on the Billboard 200 reaching No. 110. Kilzer wrote all the songs except "Red Blue Jeans", co-written with Richard Ford. The tracks "Red Blue Jeans" and "Green, Yellow and Red" taken from the album, charted in 1988 on the Mainstream Rock Tracks (No. 12 and No. 36, respectively). Rosanne Cash recorded "Green, Yellow and Red" for her album King's Record Shop. Another Kilzer song, "707," appeared as the B-side of the single "The Way We Make a Broken Heart"; it was included as a bonus track on the 2005 CD version of that album.

His next studio album, Busman's Holiday, released in 1991, did not make it to the Billboard 200, and its single, "Marilyn Dean And James Monroe”, achieved minor success.

During his life, Kilzer struggled with alcohol addiction. In 2010, he earned a PhD in Theology and started helping people recovering from substance abuse. Until his death, Kilzer served as an associate pastor for recovery ministries at St. John's United Methodist Church in Memphis.

Kilzer died by suicide (by hanging) on March 12, 2019, at the age of 62.
