= Borderline (Ry Cooder album) =

Studio album by Ry Cooder
- Released: October 1980
- Recorded: Warner Bros., Burbank, CA
- Genre: Roots rock
- Length: 43:30
- Label: Warner Bros.
- Producer: Ry Cooder

Ry Cooder chronology
Bop till You Drop (1979)	Borderline (1980)	The Slide Area (1982)

Borderline is an album by Ry Cooder, released in 1980. "The Way We Make a Broken Heart" is a cover of the John Hiatt song.

== Critical reception ==
Professional ratings
Review scores
Source	Rating
AllMusic	3/5 stars
Robert Christgau	B−
The Rolling Stone Album Guide	2/5 stars

Robert Christgau wrote that "Cooder's current soul/r&b interests inhibit his songfinding." The Globe and Mail wrote that "Borderline" "is a lovely instrumental which features the least slick, most emotional playing by an efficient set of hired guns."

== Track listing ==
Side one

1. "634–5789" (Steve Cropper, Eddie Floyd) – 2:56
2. "Speedo" (Esther Navarro) – 3:20
3. "Why Don't You Try Me" (E. Young) – 4:54
4. "Down in the Boondocks" (Joe South) – 3:21
5. "Johnny Porter" (Bobby Ray Appleberry, William Cuomo) – 5:21

Side two

1. "The Way We Make a Broken Heart" (John Hiatt) – 4:28
2. "Crazy 'Bout an Automobile" (William R. Emerson) – 5:03
3. "The Girls from Texas" (James Lewis, Jimmy Holiday, Cliff Chambers) – 4:40
4. "Borderline" (Ry Cooder) – 3:19
5. "Never Make Your Move Too Soon" (Will Jennings, Nesbert Hooper Jr.) – 6:08

== Charts ==
Year	Chart	Peak
1980	Australian (Kent Music Report)	43
1981	Billboard Top LP's & Tapes	43

== Personnel ==
Source: album cover

- Ry Cooder – guitar, vibes, vocals
- Jim Keltner – drums
- George "Baboo" Pierre – percussion
- Tim Drummond – bass
- Reggie McBride – bass
- William D. Smith – piano, organ, vocals
- John Hiatt – guitar, vocals
- Jesse Harms – synthesizer
- Bobby King – vocals
- Willie Greene, Jr. – vocals

Technical

- Leslie Morris – production assistant
- Lee Herschberg – recording, mixing
- Carlos Ruano Llopis – artwork
