= King's Record Shop =

Studio album by Rosanne Cash
- Released: June 26, 1987
- Genre: Country
- Length: 52:12
- Label: Columbia
- Producer: Rodney Crowell

Rosanne Cash chronology
Rhythm & Romance (1985)	King's Record Shop (1987)	Hits 1979–1989 (1989)

Singles from King's Record Shop
- 1. "The Way We Make a Broken Heart" Released: June 1987; 2. "Tennessee Flat Top Box" Released: November 1987; 3. "If You Change Your Mind" Released: March 1988; 4. "Runaway Train" Released: July 1988

Professional ratings
Review scores
Source	Rating
AllMusic	4.5/5 stars
Chicago Sun-Times	4/4 stars
Los Angeles Times	3/4 stars
The Philadelphia Inquirer	4/4 stars
The Rolling Stone Album Guide	3.5/5 stars
Stylus Magazine	A+
Uncut	8/10
The Village Voice	A−

King's Record Shop is the sixth studio album by American country music singer Rosanne Cash. It was released on June 26, 1987, her fifth album for the label. The album produced four singles on the Billboard country singles chart. They were "The Way We Make a Broken Heart", a cover of her father Johnny Cash's "Tennessee Flat Top Box", "If You Change Your Mind", and "Runaway Train". This was the last album in Cash's career to feature Rodney Crowell as the sole record producer, who produced all of her albums since her first Columbia album Right or Wrong in 1980.

The album is named after King's Record Shop in Louisville, Kentucky, which was owned by Pee Wee King's younger brother, Gene. A photograph of Rosanne Cash standing in the shop's doorway is featured on the cover, though she was never actually at the shop for the photo. Veteran steel guitarist Hank DeVito took the photo of the record shop and one of Rosanne standing as she is in the photo. A picture of Cash's 1981 album Seven Year Ache is shown. He superimposed her into the record shop photo (Music City News magazine, August 1987).

Sony BMG controversially used its XCP technology on the album when it was re-released in 2005 as part of its American Milestones series.

== Track listing ==
No.	Title	Writer(s)	Length
1.	"Rosie Strike Back"	Eliza Gilkyson	3:32
2.	"The Way We Make a Broken Heart"	John Hiatt	3:55
3.	"If You Change Your Mind"	Rosanne Cash, Hank DeVito	3:12
4.	"The Real Me"	R. Cash	4:24
5.	"Somewhere Sometime"	R. Cash	4:05
6.	"Runaway Train"	John Stewart	3:58
7.	"Tennessee Flat Top Box"	Johnny Cash	3:10
8.	"I Don't Have to Crawl"	Rodney Crowell	4:33
9.	"Green, Yellow and Red"	John Kilzer	3:40
10.	"Why Don't You Quit Leaving Me Alone?"	Benmont Tench	4:00

=== CD bonus tracks ===
11. "707" (John Kilzer) – 3:34
12. "Runaway Train" (live) (John Stewart) – 4:17
13. "Green, Yellow and Red" (live) (John Kilzer) – 5:15

== Personnel ==
- Rosanne Cash: vocals, guitar
- Rodney Crowell: background vocals
- Vince Gill: background vocals
- Arnold McCuller: background vocals
- Mark O'Connor: mandola
- Patty Smyth: background vocals
- Benmont Tench: piano, keyboards
- Steve Winwood: background vocals
- Sterling Ball: acoustic guitar
- Eddie Bayers: drums
- Barry Beckett: piano, Hammond organ
- Larry Crane: acoustic & electric guitar
- Anthony Crawford: background vocals
- Kristen DeLauer: background vocals
- Terry Evans: background vocals
- Willie Green, Jr.: background vocals
- Bobby King: background vocals
- Joann Neal: background vocals
- Michael Rhodes: bass guitar, acoustic bass
- Vince Santoro: drums
- Randy Scruggs: acoustic guitar
- Jean Smith: background vocals
- Steuart Smith: electric guitar, gut string guitar
- Billy Joe Walker Jr.: acoustic & electric guitar

Production

- Rodney Crowell: producer
- T-Bone Toglio: assistant producer
- Margie Hunt: production assistant
- Martha Wood: production assistant
- John Agnello: engineer
- Donivan Cowart: engineer
- Jeanne Kinney: engineer
- Steve Marcantonio: engineer, mixing
- Keith Odle: engineer
- Frank Pekoc: engineer
- George Marino: mastering

== Charts ==
=== Weekly charts ===
Chart (1987–1988)	Peak position
Canadian Albums (RPM)	57
US Billboard 200	138
US Top Country Albums (Billboard)	6

=== Year-end charts ===
Chart (1988)	Position
US Top Country Albums (Billboard)	6
Chart (1989)	Position
US Top Country Albums (Billboard)	47
