= Whiskey, If You Were a Woman =

1987 single by Highway 101

Single by Highway 101

from the album Highway 101
- B-side: "I'll Take You (Heartache and All)"
- Released: May 23, 1987
- Genre: Country
- Length: 3:03
- Label: Warner Bros. #28372
- Songwriter(s): Mary W. Francis; Johnny MacRae; Bob Morrison
- Producer(s): Paul Worley

Highway 101 singles chronology
"The Bed You Made for Me" (1986)	"Whiskey, If You Were a Woman" (1987)	"Somewhere Tonight" (1987)

"Whiskey, If You Were a Woman" is a song written by Mary W. Francis, Johnny MacRae and Bob Morrison, and recorded by American country music band Highway 101. It was released in May 1987 as the second single from the band's self-titled debut album.

The song spent 23 weeks on the U.S. Hot Country Singles charts, peaking at number 2. In Canada, it reached Number One on the country music charts published by RPM.

== Charts ==
=== Weekly charts ===
Chart (1987)	Peak position
US Hot Country Songs (Billboard)	2
Canadian RPM Country Tracks	1

=== Year-end charts ===
Chart (1987)	Position
US Hot Country Songs (Billboard)	42
