= Baby, I'm Missing You =

Single by Highway 101

from the album Bing Bang Boom
- B-side: "Desperate"
- Released: January 11, 1992
- Genre: Country
- Length: 2:54
- Label: Warner Bros.
- Songwriters: Steve Seskin, Nancy Montgomery
- Producers: Paul Worley, Ed Seay

Highway 101 singles chronology
"The Blame" (1991)	"Baby, I'm Missing You" (1992)	"Honky Tonk Baby" (1992)

"Baby, I'm Missing You" is a song written by Steve Seskin and Nancy Montgomery, and recorded by American country music group Highway 101. It was released in January 1992 as the third single from the 1991 album Bing Bang Boom. The song reached #22 on the Billboard Hot Country Singles & Tracks chart.

== Chart performance ==
Chart (1992)	Peak position
Canada Country Singles (RPM)	18
US Hot Country Songs (Billboard)	22
