= All the Reasons Why =

1988 single by Highway 101

Single by Highway 101

from the album 101²
- B-side: "Higher Ground"
- Released: September 1988
- Genre: Country
- Length: 3:35
- Label: Warner Bros.
- Songwriter(s): Paulette Carlson; Beth Nielsen Chapman
- Producer(s): Paul Worley; Ed Seay

Highway 101 singles chronology
"(Do You Love Me) Just Say Yes" (1988)	"All the Reasons Why" (1988)	"Setting Me Up" (1989)

"All the Reasons Why" is a song written by Paulette Carlson and Beth Nielsen Chapman, and recorded by American country music group Highway 101. It was released in September 1988 as the second single from their album 101². The song reached #5 on the Billboard Hot Country Singles chart in January 1989.

== Chart performance ==
Chart (1988–1989)	Peak position
US Hot Country Songs (Billboard)	5
Canadian RPM Country Tracks	2
