= The Way We Make a Broken Heart =

Single by Rosanne Cash

from the album King's Record Shop
- B-side: "707"
- Released: June 1987
- Genre: Country
- Length: 3:55
- Label: Columbia
- Songwriter(s): John Hiatt
- Producer(s): Rodney Crowell

Rosanne Cash singles chronology
"Second to No One" (1986)	"The Way We Make a Broken Heart" (1987)	"Tennessee Flat Top Box" (1987)

"The Way We Make a Broken Heart" is a song written by John Hiatt. It was recorded by Ry Cooder in 1980 on his album Borderline. "The Way We Make a Broken Heart" was covered by both John Hiatt and Rosanne Cash in 1983 as a duet. The single was produced by Scott Mathews and Ron Nagle, however, Geffen Records did not release the single. Willy DeVille performed this song twice in Berlin 2002; once in an unplugged version and once with his electric band. This is documented on his 2002 album Live in Berlin. Asleep At The Wheel also recorded the song on their 1985 album Pasture Prime under the title "This Is the Way We Make a Broken Heart".

== 1987 recording ==
- Rosanne Cash re-recorded the song in 1987, and it went to number one on the US country charts, her sixth single to do so.

== Charts ==
=== Weekly charts ===
Chart (1987)	Peak position
US Hot Country Songs (Billboard)	1
Canadian RPM Country Tracks	1

=== Year-end charts ===
Chart (1987)	Position
US Hot Country Songs (Billboard)	9
