= I'll Start with You =

Single by Paulette Carlson

from the album Love Goes On
- Released: November 23, 1991
- Genre: Country
- Length: 3:12
- Label: Capitol Nashville
- Songwriters: Paulette Carlson, Tom Shapiro, Chris Waters
- Producers: Jimmy Bowen, Paulette Carlson

Paulette Carlson singles chronology
"Can You Fool" (1984)	"I'll Start with You" (1991)	"Not with My Heart You Don't" (1992)

"I'll Start with You" is a song co-written and recorded by American country music artist Paulette Carlson. It was released in November 1991 as the first single from the album Love Goes On. The song was written by Carlson, Tom Shapiro and Chris Waters.

== Chart performance ==
"I'll Start with You" reached No. 21 on the Billboard Hot Country Singles & Tracks chart.

Chart (1991–1992)	Peak position
US Hot Country Songs (Billboard)	21
Canadian RPM Country Tracks	50

== Popular culture ==
- The chorus of the song was used in Canadian Tire commercials in 2001.
