= Love Goes On (Paulette Carlson album) =

Studio album by Paulette Carlson
- Released: December 14, 1991
- Genre: Country
- Length: 31:13
- Label: Capitol
- Producer: Jimmy Bowen; Paulette Carlson

Paulette Carlson chronology
Love Goes On (1991)	Christmas Is For You (1993)

Singles from Love Goes On
- 1. "I'll Start with You" Released: November 23, 1991; 2. "Not with My Heart You Don't" Released: April 4, 1992; 3. "The Chain Just Broke" Released: July 11, 1992

Love Goes On is the debut solo studio album by American country music singer Paulette Carlson, who until 1991 was the lead singer of the band Highway 101. Her first solo album, it produced the singles "I'll Start with You" and "Not with My Heart You Don't," which respectively reached numbers 21 and 68 on the Hot Country Songs charts. A third single, "The Chain Just Broke," failed to chart.

== Critical reception ==
Michael McCall of Allmusic rated the album four stars out of five, saying that she showed a similar musical personality to her work in Highway 101, but adding that the production was too slick. Alanna Nash of Entertainment Weekly gave the album a "C", saying that "Without a spirited band behind her[…]Carlson and her hyper-quavering soprano seem oddly detached from the material, which, with the exception of the bluesy The Chain Just Broke, seems merely bland and undistinguished country-pop."

== Track listing ==
No.	Title	Writer(s)	Length
1.	"I'll Start with You"	Paulette Carlson, Tom Shapiro, Chris Waters	3:12
2.	"Not with My Heart You Don't"	Carlson, Jeff Pennig, Michael Noble	2:56
3.	"Someone I Used to Know"	Carlson, Shapiro, Waters	3:24
4.	"Love Is Never Wrong"	Paul Overstreet, Don Schlitz	3:13
5.	"Why Should I?"	Shapiro, Chuck Jones	3:05
6.	"The Chain Just Broke"	Monty Powell, Noble	3:16
7.	"It's Too Bad"	Carlson, Shapiro, Waters	3:03
8.	"Where Ya Comin' From"	Carlson, Shapiro, Waters	2:45
9.	"Falling in Love for a Lifetime"	Carlson, Jerry Careaga	2:55
10.	"Love Goes On"	Carlson, Shapiro, Waters	3:24

== Personnel ==
- Paulette Carlson - Lead Vocals
- Bill Cuomo - Synthesizer, piano
- Paul Franklin - Pedabro, Steel Guitar
- Sonny Garrish - Steel Guitar
- Vicki Hampton - Background Vocals
- John Barlow Jarvis - Piano
- Mike Lawler - Synthesizer
- Tom Roady - Percussion
- Chris Rodriguez - Background Vocals
- Leland Sklar - Bass guitar
- Harry Stinson - Background Vocals
- Carlos Vega - Drums
- Billy Joe Walker, Jr. - Acoustic Guitar
- Reggie Young - Electric guitar
