= 101² =

Studio album by Highway 101
- Released: 1988
- Genre: Country
- Label: Warner
- Producer: Paul Worley, Ed Seay

Highway 101 chronology
Highway 101 (1987)	101² (1988)	Paint the Town (1989)

Singles from Highway 101²
- 1. "(Do You Love Me) Just Say Yes" Released: June 1988; 2. "All the Reasons Why" Released: September 1988; 3. "Setting Me Up" Released: January 1989; 4. "Honky Tonk Heart" Released: May 1989

Professional ratings
Review scores
Source	Rating
Allmusic -	3/5 stars

101² is the second studio album by American country music band Highway 101. It accounted for four singles on the Hot Country Songs: "(Do You Love Me) Just Say Yes" at No. 1, "All the Reasons Why" at No. 5, "Honky Tonk Heart" at No. 6, and their cover of Dire Straits' "Setting Me Up" at No. 7. The album itself reached No. 8 on Top Country Albums.

== Track listing ==
No.	Title	Writer(s)	Length
1.	"Honky Tonk Heart"	Jim Photoglo, Russell Smith	3:24
2.	"Road to Your Heart"	Wendy Waldman, Josh Leo, Jim Photoglo	3:29
3.	"Feed This Fire"	Hugh Prestwood	2:56
4.	"Setting Me Up"	Mark Knopfler	3:49
5.	"Somewhere Between Gone and Goodbye"	Matraca Berg, Ronnie Samoset	3:42
6.	"There Goes My Love"	Buck Owens	2:08
7.	"Desperate Road"	Rick Giles, Richard "Spady" Brannan	3:29
8.	"All the Reasons Why"	Paulette Carlson, Beth Nielsen Chapman	3:35
9.	"Long Way Down"	Chapman	4:02
10.	"(Do You Love Me) Just Say Yes"	Bob DiPiero, John Scott Sherrill, Dennis Robbins	3:42

== Charts ==
=== Weekly charts ===
Chart (1988)	Peak position
US Top Country Albums (Billboard)	8

=== Year-end charts ===
Chart (1989)	Position
US Top Country Albums (Billboard)	24
