= Setting Me Up =

1978 song by Dire Straits

Song by Dire Straits

from the album Dire Straits
- Released: 7 October 1978
- Genre: Roots rock; country rock
- Length: 3:18
- Label: Vertigo
- Songwriter: Mark Knopfler
- Producer: Muff Winwood

"Setting Me Up"

Single by Highway 101

from the album 101²
- B-side: "Long Way Down"
- Released: January 1989
- Genre: Country
- Length: 3:49
- Label: Warner Bros.
- Songwriter: Mark Knopfler
- Producers: Paul Worley; Ed Seay

Highway 101 singles chronology
"All the Reasons Why" (1988)	"Setting Me Up" (1989)	"Honky Tonk Heart" (1989)

"Setting Me Up" is a song written by Mark Knopfler. It was originally recorded by British rock group Dire Straits on their self-titled debut album but not released as a single. Ken Tucker in Rolling Stone described the song as a "heavenly number" combining humor with bitterness, despite having a typical messed-up romance theme. Tucker noted that the song's impact is enhanced by the growling tone in Knopfler's singing voice and by the song's country music-style guitar solo. Carly Darling in Billboard Magazine praised the song's rockabilly guitar but criticizes the lyrics.

The song appeared on Eric Clapton's 1980 double live album Just One Night, with Albert Lee singing lead vocals. Albert Lee also covered the song on his album Hiding, with backing harmonies sung by Don Everly.

"Setting Me Up" is one of five songs that Knopfler's publisher made country demos of without the songwriter's approval, leading to a number of country covers of this and other songs. American country music group Highway 101 covered the song for their 1988 album 101² and released it as the album's third single in January 1989. The song reached No. 7 on the Billboard Hot Country Singles chart in April 1989. Their version features a shared lead vocal by Paulette Carlson and bassist Curtis Stone.

== Chart performance: Highway 101 single ==
Chart (1989)	Peak position
Canada Country Singles (RPM)	4
US Hot Country Songs (Billboard)	7

=== Year-end charts ===
Chart (1989)	Position
Canada Country Tracks (RPM)	74
US Country Songs (Billboard)	97
