= Who's Lonely Now =

Single by Highway 101

from the album Paint the Town
- B-side: "Don't It Make Your Mama Cry"
- Released: September 1989
- Genre: Country
- Length: 3:25
- Label: Warner Bros.
- Songwriters: Kix Brooks; Don Cook
- Producers: Paul Worley; Ed Seay

Highway 101 singles chronology
"Honky Tonk Heart" (1989)	"Who's Lonely Now" (1989)	"Walkin', Talkin', Cryin', Barely Beatin' Broken Heart" (1990)

"Who's Lonely Now" is a song written by Kix Brooks and Don Cook and recorded by American country music group Highway 101. It was released in September 1989 as the first single from their album Paint the Town. The song was Highway 101's ninth country hit and the last of four number one country hits. The single went to number one for two weeks and spent a total of twenty-six weeks on the country singles charts.

== Chart performance ==
Chart (1989–1990)	Peak position
Canada Country Singles (RPM)	1
US Hot Country Songs (Billboard)	1

=== Year-end charts ===
Chart (1990)	Position
Canada Country Tracks (RPM)	64
US Country Songs (Billboard)	49
