= Runaway Train (Rosanne Cash song) =

Single by Rosanne Cash

from the album King's Record Shop
- B-side: "Seven Year Ache"
- Released: July 1988
- Genre: Rock; pop
- Length: 3:58
- Label: Columbia
- Songwriter(s): John Stewart
- Producer(s): Rodney Crowell

Rosanne Cash singles chronology
"If You Change Your Mind" (1988)	"Runaway Train" (1988)	"I Don't Want to Spoil the Party" (1989)

"Runaway Train" is a song written by John Stewart, and recorded by American country music artist Rosanne Cash. It was released in July 1988 as the fourth single from the album King's Record Shop. The song was Cash's ninth number one on the country chart as a solo artist. The single went to number one for one week and spent a total of 14 weeks within the top 40.

John Stewart released his own version on his 1987 album Punch the Big Guy.

Mary Chapin Carpenter also recorded the song for her debut album Hometown Girl, but her version of it did not make the final cut.

== Charts ==
=== Weekly charts ===
Chart (1988)	Peak position
US Hot Country Songs (Billboard)	1
Canadian RPM Country Tracks	2

=== Year-end charts ===
Chart (1988)	Position
US Hot Country Songs (Billboard)	34
