= The New Frontier (album) =

Studio album by Highway 101
- Released: October 19, 1993
- Genre: Country
- Length: 33:09
- Label: Liberty
- Producer: Chuck Howard, Cactus Moser, and Curtis Stone

Highway 101 chronology
Bing Bang Boom (1991)	The New Frontier (1993)	Reunited (1996)

Professional ratings
Review scores
Source	Rating
AllMusic	2/5 stars

The New Frontier is an album by the American country music band Highway 101. Released in 1993, it was the band's only album on Liberty Records. Its only charting single was "You Baby You", which reached number 67 on the country music charts.

"No Chance to Dance" was previously recorded by Johnny Rodriguez in 1988 for his album "Gracias" and his version was released as a single reaching No. 72 on the charts in 1989. And it was also recorded in 1990 by Bob DiPiero, Dennis Robbins, and John Scott Sherrill (the writers of the song) when they formed the band Billy Hill, their version never made it on the charts.

== Track listing ==
1. "You Baby You" (Chris McCarty, Gary Mallaber) – 3:22
2. "Home on the Range" (Cactus Moser, Chuck Jones) – 2:59
3. "Tell Me More" (Moser, Jones) – 2:46
4. "No Chance to Dance" (Bob DiPiero, John Scott Sherrill, Dennis Robbins) – 3:08
5. "Who's Gonna Love You" (Curtis Stone, Matraca Berg) – 3:37
6. "The Last Frontier" (Moser, Jones) – 3:57
7. "Fastest Healin' Broken Heart" (Curtis Stone, Pat Bunch) – 2:38
8. "Love Walks" (Moser, Mike Noble, Jeff Pennig) – 4:01
9. "You Are What You Do" (DiPiero, John Jarrard, Mark D. Sanders) – 2:59
10. "I Wonder Where the Love Goes" (Moser, Jones) – 3:42

== Personnel ==
Highway 101

- Cactus Moser – drums, guitars, vocals
- Nikki Nelson – lead vocals, guitars
- Curtis Stone – bass guitar, mandolin, guitars, vocals

Additional musicians

- Michael Black – background vocals
- Larry Byrom – electric guitar
- Mark Casstevens – acoustic guitar, mandolin
- Larry Chaney – electric guitar
- Dan Dugmore – steel guitar
- Stuart Duncan – fiddle, mandolin
- Thom Flora – background vocals
- Paul Franklin – steel guitar
- Tony Harrell – keyboards
- Dann Huff – electric guitar
- John Jorgenson – electric guitar
- Steve Nathan – keyboards
- Mike Noble – acoustic guitar
- Harry Stinson – background vocals

Technical

- Derek Bason – recording assistant, mixing assistant
- Bob Campbell-Smith – additional recording
- Eric Elwell – additional recording
- Chuck Howard – producer
- John Kelton – recording (except for "Love Walks"), mixing
- Mel Jones – recording assistant
- Pat McMakin – recording ("Love Walks" only)
- Glenn Meadows – mastering
- Cactus Moser – producer
- Curtis Stone – producer

== Singles ==
Year	Single	B-side	US Country Chart
1993	"You Baby You"	"You Are What You Do"	# 67
1993	"Who's Gonna Love You"	"Who's Gonna Love You"	# -
