= Nikki Nelson =

American country music singer (born 1969)

- Born: January 3, 1969 (age 57); La Mesa, California U.S.
- Genres: Country
- Occupation: Singer
- Instrument: Vocals
- Years active: 1987–present
- Labels: 19th Avenue, Columbia
- Formerly of: Highway 101

Nikki Nelson (born January 3, 1969, in La Mesa, California) is an American country music singer. When she was seven, she and her family moved to Topaz Lake, Nevada. In 1991, she replaced Paulette Carlson as lead vocalist for the band Highway 101, and their first album together was that year's Bing Bang Boom. She also sang lead vocals on the band's next album, 1993's The New Frontier.

Carlson returned to Highway 101 in 1995 for the album Reunited, and Nelson signed a solo recording deal with Columbia Records, Nashville. She released the single "Too Little Too Much" in 1997 and charted at No. 62 on the Hot Country Songs charts. Chrislynn Lee replaced Carlson after the Reunited album, and remained that band's lead vocalist until 2006, when Nelson rejoined.

== Discography ==
=== Singles ===
| Year | Single | Peak chart positions | |
| Year | Single | US Country | CAN Country |
|---|---|---|---|
| 1987 | "My Heart Cracked (But It Did Not Break)" | — | — |
| 1988 | "Show Me (I'm from Missouri)" | — | — |
| 1988 | "Building Back a Bridge" | — | — |
| 1997 | "Too Little Too Much" | 62 | 80 |
| 1997 | "I Don't Know How Not to Love You" | — | — |
"—" denotes releases that did not chart

=== Music videos ===
| Year | Video | Director |
|---|---|---|
| 1997 | "Too Little Too Much" | Jim Hershleder |
