= This Side of Goodbye =

1990 single by Highway 101

Single by Highway 101

from the album Paint the Town
- B-side: "If Love Had a Heart"
- Released: May 26, 1990
- Genre: Country
- Length: 4:05
- Label: Warner Bros.
- Songwriters: Scott "Cactus" Moser, Jeff Pennig, Michael Noble
- Producers: Paul Worley, Ed Seay

Highway 101 singles chronology
| "Walkin', Talkin', Cryin', Barely Beatin' Broken Heart" (1990) | "This Side of Goodbye" (1990) | "Someone Else's Trouble Now" (1990) |

"This Side of Goodbye" is a song written by Scott "Cactus" Moser, Jeff Pennig, and Michael Noble, and recorded by American country music group Highway 101. It was released in May 1990 as the third single from the album Paint the Town. The song reached #11 on the Billboard Hot Country Singles & Tracks chart.

== Chart performance ==
| Chart (1990) | Peak position |
|---|---|
| Canada Country Singles (RPM) | 9 |
| US Hot Country Songs (Billboard) | 11 |
