= Walkin', Talkin', Cryin', Barely Beatin' Broken Heart =

Single by Highway 101

from the album Paint the Town
- B-side: "Sweet Baby James"
- Released: January 1990
- Genre: Country
- Length: 2:33
- Label: Warner Bros.
- Songwriters: Roger Miller; Justin Tubb
- Producers: Paul Worley; Ed Seay

Highway 101 singles chronology
"Who's Lonely Now" (1989)	"Walkin', Talkin', Cryin', Barely Beatin' Broken Heart" (1990)	"This Side of Goodbye" (1990)

"Walkin', Talkin', Cryin', Barely Beatin' Broken Heart" is a song written by Roger Miller and Justin Tubb. It was first recorded by American country music artist Johnnie Wright, whose version peaked at number 22 on the Billboard Hot Country Singles chart in 1964. American country music group Highway 101 covered the song on their 1989 album Paint the Town and it was released as the album's second single in January 1990. Their version reached number 4 on the Billboard Hot Country Singles & Tracks chart in April 1990.

== Music video ==
The music video was directed by Michael Merriman and premiered in early 1990. Miller made a cameo appearance in the video.

== Chart performance ==
=== Johnnie Wright ===
Chart (1964)	Peak position
US Hot Country Songs (Billboard)	22

=== Highway 101 ===
Chart (1990)	Peak position
Canada Country Singles (RPM)	5
US Hot Country Songs (Billboard)	4

==== Year-end charts ====
Chart (1990)	Position
Canada Country Tracks (RPM)	85
US Country Songs (Billboard)	46
