= If You Change Your Mind =

Single by Rosanne Cash

from the album King's Record Shop
- B-side: "Somewhere Sometime"
- Released: March 24, 1988
- Genre: Country
- Length: 3:12
- Label: Columbia
- Songwriter(s): Rosanne Cash; Hank DeVito
- Producer(s): Rodney Crowell

Rosanne Cash singles chronology
"It's Such a Small World" (1988)	"If You Change Your Mind" (1988)	"Runaway Train" (1988)

"If You Change Your Mind" is a song recorded by American country music artist Rosanne Cash who co-wrote the song with Hank DeVito. It was released in March 1988 as the third single from the album King's Record Shop. The song was Cash's ninth number one on the country chart. The single went to number one for one week and spent a total of 15 weeks on the country chart.

== Charts ==
=== Weekly charts ===
Chart (1988)	Peak position
US Hot Country Songs (Billboard)	1
Canadian RPM Country Tracks	1

=== Year-end charts ===
Chart (1988)	Position
Canadian RPM Country Tracks	20
US Hot Country Songs (Billboard)	2
