= Honky Tonk Heart =

1989 single by Highway 101

Single by Highway 101

from the album 101²
- B-side: "Desperate Road"
- Released: May 1989
- Genre: Country
- Length: 3:24
- Label: Warner Bros.
- Songwriters: Jim Photoglo; Russell Smith
- Producers: Paul Worley; Ed Seay

Highway 101 singles chronology
"Setting Me Up" (1989)	"Honky Tonk Heart" (1989)	"Who's Lonely Now" (1989)

"Honky Tonk Heart" is a song written by Russell Smith and Jim Photoglo, and recorded by American country music group Highway 101. It was released in May 1989 as the fourth single from their album 101². The song reached #6 on the Billboard Hot Country Singles chart in September 1989.

== Chart performance ==
Chart (1989)	Peak position
Canada Country Singles (RPM)	5
US Hot Country Songs (Billboard)	6

=== Year-end charts ===
Chart (1989)	Position
Canada Country Tracks (RPM)	96
US Country Songs (Billboard)	67
