= The Bed You Made for Me =

Single by Highway 101

from the album Highway 101
- B-side: "I'm Gonna Run Through the Wind"
- Released: December 1986
- Genre: Country
- Length: 3:33
- Label: Warner Bros. #28483
- Songwriter(s): Paulette Carlson
- Producer(s): Paul Worley

Highway 101 singles chronology
"Some Find Love" (1986)	"The Bed You Made for Me" (1986)	"Whiskey, If You Were a Woman" (1987)

"The Bed You Made for Me" is a song by American country music band Highway 101, written by their lead singer Paulette Carlson. It was released in December 1986 as the first single from the band's self-titled debut album. "The Bed You Made for Me" spent twenty-four weeks on the Hot Country Songs charts, peaking at number four.

== Critical reception ==
Kip Kirby, of Billboard magazine reviewed the song favorably, calling it "dynamic" and saying that it is "apologetically country in instrumentation and vocal, with energy and outrage that are almost palpable."

== Charts ==
Chart (1986–1987)	Peak position
Canada Country Tracks (RPM)	8
US Hot Country Songs (Billboard)	4
