= Tennessee Flat Top Box =

1961 single by Johnny Cash

Single by Johnny Cash

from the album Ring of Fire: The Best of Johnny Cash
- B-side: "Tall Men"
- Released: December 1961
- Genre: Country
- Length: 3:00
- Label: Columbia #42147
- Songwriter: Johnny Cash
- Producers: Don Law, Frank Jones

Johnny Cash singles chronology
"The Rebel – Johnny Yuma" (1961)	"Tennessee Flat Top Box" (1961)	"The Big Battle" (1962)

Audio
- "Tennessee Flat Top Box" on YouTube

"Tennessee Flat Top Box" is a song written and recorded by American country music singer Johnny Cash. It was released as a single in late 1961, reaching 11 on the Billboard country singles charts and 84 on the pop charts. In 1987, Cash's daughter Rosanne also release a rendition of the song, which peaked at number one on the Billboard country music charts.

== Content ==
The song is a story of a little boy aspiring to be a country singer, who starts his career at a local cabaret in a South Texas border town. He has no physical abilities, only his ability to play the guitar, which he loves so much that making money is secondary to him. He becomes so popular that girls "from there to Austin" would secretly leave home and pawn jewelry for money to make the trip to hear him play, and "all the girls from nine to ninety, were snapping fingers, tapping toes, and begging him: 'Don't stop.'"

Ultimately he disappears from the local scene, only to re-emerge on television, having fulfilled his dream. The title of the song refers to an acoustic guitar.

=== Charts ===
Chart (1961)	Peak position
US Hot Country Songs (Billboard)	11
US Billboard Hot 100	84

== Rosanne Cash version ==
"Tennessee Flat Top Box"

Single by Rosanne Cash

from the album King's Record Shop
- B-side: "Why Don't You Quit Leaving Me Alone"
- Released: November 1987
- Genre: Country
- Length: 3:09
- Label: Columbia #07624
- Songwriter: Johnny Cash
- Producer: Rodney Crowell

Rosanne Cash singles chronology
"The Way We Make a Broken Heart" (1987)	"Tennessee Flat Top Box" (1987)	"It's Such a Small World" (1988)

Cash's daughter Rosanne Cash recorded a cover version of "Tennessee Flat Top Box" in 1987 on her album King's Record Shop. Released in November 1987 as the album's third single, it was also the third of four consecutive number-one country hits from that album, peaking in February 1988. Randy Scruggs played the acoustic guitar solos on it.

Rosanne Cash recorded the song at the suggestion of her then-husband, fellow country singer Rodney Crowell. When she recorded the song, she was unaware that her father wrote it, and assumed that it was in the public domain. Johnny later told Rosanne that her success with the song was "one of [his] greatest fulfillments." The Rolling Stone Encyclopedia of Rock & Roll cited Rosanne's cover as a "healing of her strained relationship with her dad." Following her father's death in 2003, Rosanne Cash performed the song during The Johnny Cash Memorial Tribute concert TV special.

=== Charts ===
==== Weekly charts ====
Chart (1987–1988)	Peak position
US Hot Country Songs (Billboard)	1
Canadian RPM Country Tracks	1

==== Year-end charts ====
Chart (1988)	Position
US Hot Country Songs (Billboard)	50

== Use in video game ==
A version was made available to download on January 4, 2011, for use in the Rock Band 3 music gaming platform in both basic rhythm, and PRO mode which allows use of a real guitar / bass guitar, and MIDI-compatible electronic drum kits / keyboards in addition to vocals.
