= Hugh Prestwood =

American songwriter (1942–2024)

- Born: Hugh Loring Prestwood; April 2, 1942
- Origin: El Paso, Texas, U.S.
- Died: September 22, 2024 (aged 82) Nebraska
- Genres: Country
- Occupation: Songwriter
- Years active: 1978–2024
- Website: http://www.hughprestwood.com/

Hugh Loring Prestwood (April 2, 1942 – September 22, 2024) was an American Hall of Fame songwriter, whose work was primarily in country music. In the early 1970s, Prestwood made his way to Greenwich Village to pursue his songwriting career. While doing the various open mics, he teamed up with another aspiring songwriter, Robert Caleb Potter, and performed as a duo at many of the local venues under the name Ginger. Eventually his songs came to the attention of Judy Collins, who gave him his first hit, "Hard Time for Lovers", which she recorded in 1978. Prestwood has written several number one songs, such as Crystal Gayle's "The Sound of Goodbye" and Randy Travis's "Hard Rock Bottom of Your Heart", which won BMI's Robert J. Burton award for Country Song of the Year. Prestwood’s song, “The Song Remembers When”, recorded by Trisha Yearwood, was picked as the Nashville Songwriters Association’s Song of the Year and also won a Prime Time Emmy for “Outstanding Achievement in Music and Lyrics.

Other artists who have recorded his material include Shenandoah and Alison Krauss ("Ghost in This House"), Highway 101 ("Bing Bang Boom"), Barbara Mandrell ("Where are the Pieces of My Heart"), John Conlee, Tanya Tucker, Don Williams, The Judds, James Taylor and Jerry Douglas. Michael Johnson has recorded or performed over a dozen Prestwood-penned songs, including his 1987 number one hit "The Moon Is Still Over Her Shoulder"; Johnson's LP's That's That, Michael Johnson, and Departure each feature multiple Prestwood songs. Prestwood is also known for his song "Asking Us to Dance," which originally appeared on Kathy Mattea's album Time Passes By. Jimmy Buffett recorded "Savannah Fare You Well," on his Far Side of the World album. The song was written by Prestwood and not, as many might assume, by Buffett for his daughter Savannah Jane, born 1979.

Three of Prestwood's songs have been nominated for Grammys in the "Best Performance" category:

"Sound of Goodbye" performed by Crystal Gayle. "Hard Rock Bottom of Your Heart" performed by Randy Travis. "Ghost in this House" performed by Shenandoah.

In 2006, along with Jimmy Buffett and Jim Weatherly, Prestwood was inducted into the Nashville Songwriters’ Hall of Fame.

For over 20 years he taught Advanced Songwriting at Manhattan’s New School.

Most recently, the English recording artist Rumer released her album, Nashville Tears - The Songs of Hugh Prestwood (2020). All 15 tracks of this album were written by Prestwood.

== Personal life ==
Hugh Prestwood married photographer Judy Ahrens in 1987, and they remained together until his death.

Prestwood died from a stroke on September 22, 2024, at the age of 82.
