= Somewhere Tonight =

Single by Highway 101

from the album Highway 101
- B-side: "Are You Still Mine"
- Released: September 21, 1987
- Genre: Country
- Length: 3:17
- Label: Warner Bros. #28223
- Songwriter(s): Harlan Howard; Rodney Crowell
- Producer(s): Paul Worley

Highway 101 singles chronology
"Whiskey, If You Were a Woman" (1987)	"Somewhere Tonight" (1987)	"Cry, Cry, Cry" (1988)

"Somewhere Tonight" is a song written by Rodney Crowell and Harlan Howard, and recorded by American country music group Highway 101. It was released in September 1987 as the third single from the album Highway 101. The song was Highway 101's third country hit and the first of four number ones on the country chart. The single went to number one on the Hot Country Singles chart, spending two weeks at that position and twenty-three weeks on the chart. In January 1988, it also reached number one on the Canadian country singles charts published by RPM.

== Charts ==
Chart (1987)	Peak position
US Hot Country Songs (Billboard)	1
