= Cry, Cry, Cry (Highway 101 song) =

Single by Highway 101

from the album Highway 101
- B-side: "One Step Closer"
- Released: January 1988
- Genre: Country
- Length: 2:29
- Label: Warner Bros. #28105
- Songwriters: Don Devaney; John Scott Sherrill
- Producer: Paul Worley

Highway 101 singles chronology
"Somewhere Tonight" (1987)	"Cry, Cry, Cry" (1988)	"(Do You Love Me) Just Say Yes" (1988)

"Cry, Cry, Cry" is a song written by John Scott Sherrill and Don Devaney, and recorded by American country music group Highway 101. It was released in January 1988 as the fourth single from the album Highway 101. The song was Highway 101's second number-one single on the country chart. The single went to number one on the Hot Country Singles chart, holding the position for one week. In Canada, the song went to number one on the RPM country singles chart.

== Music video ==
The music video was directed by Claude Borenzweig and premiered in early 1988.

== Charts ==
=== Weekly charts ===
Chart (1988)	Peak position
US Hot Country Songs (Billboard)	1
Canadian RPM Country Tracks	1

=== Year-end charts ===
Chart (1988)	Position
Canadian RPM Country Tracks	6
US Hot Country Songs (Billboard)	31
