= (Do You Love Me) Just Say Yes =

1988 single Highway 101

Single by Highway 101

from the album 101²
- B-side: "I'll Be Missing You"
- Released: June 1988
- Genre: Country
- Length: 3:40
- Label: Warner Bros. #27867
- Songwriters: Bob DiPiero; John Scott Sherrill; Dennis Robbins
- Producer: Paul Worley

Highway 101 singles chronology
| "Cry, Cry, Cry" (1988) | "(Do You Love Me) Just Say Yes" (1988) | "All the Reasons Why" (1988) |

"(Do You Love Me) Just Say Yes" is a song written by Bob DiPiero, John Scott Sherrill and Dennis Robbins, and recorded by American country music group Highway 101. It was released in June 1988 as the first single from the album 101². The song was Highway 101's third number one on the country chart. The song spent one week at that position and twenty weeks on the chart. It also reached Number One on the RPM Country Tracks charts in Canada.

== Charts ==
=== Weekly charts ===
| Chart (1988) | Peak position |
|---|---|
| US Hot Country Songs (Billboard) | 1 |
| Canadian RPM Country Tracks | 1 |

=== Year-end charts ===
| Chart (1988) | Position |
|---|---|
| US Hot Country Songs (Billboard) | 26 |
