= Paulette Carlson =

- Born: Paulette Tenae Carlson; October 11, 1952 (age 73)
- Origin: Moose Lake, Minnesota, United States
- Genres: Country
- Occupation: Singer-songwriter
- Instruments: Vocals, guitar
- Years active: 1983–present
- Labels: RCA, Warner Bros., Capitol, Pandean
- Formerly of: Highway 101
- Website: Paulette Carlson Official Website

Paulette Tenae Carlson (born October 11, 1952) is an American country music singer-songwriter, who rose to fame in the 1980s as the founder and lead vocalist for the country band Highway 101. With Highway 101, she charted four No. 1 hit singles, seven Top 10 hits and won two Country Music Association Awards. As a solo artist, she has charted five times on Hot Country Songs and recorded three studio albums. Her most successful solo single is "I'll Start with You", which peaked at number 21 in 1991. Carlson continues to tour and record new music as a solo artist.

== Beginnings ==
Paulette Carlson began professionally singing in the dance bars in Fargo, ND, and in the Minneapolis, MN, area and built a large local following before heading to Nashville in 1978. Soon after arriving in Nashville she was signed as a staff songwriter for the Oak Ridge Boys’ Silverline/Goldline Publishing Company. She signed a singles contract with RCA Records and released three singles: "You Gotta Get to My Heart", "I’d Say Yes", and "Can You Fool".

== Highway 101 ==
Carlson founded Highway 101 in 1986 with session musicians Jack Daniels, Scott "Cactus" Moser, and Curtis Stone. The band was signed to Warner Bros. Records with Paul Worley producing. Carlson recorded three albums, a Greatest Hits package, and 12 singles for the group before leaving in 1991. Nikki Nelson replaced her as lead vocalist that year.

== Solo ==
Carlson signed with Capitol Nashville in 1991 and released Love Goes On, which she produced with Jimmy Bowen. She also co-wrote seven of the album's ten tracks. The first single, "I’ll Start With You" charted at number 21, and "Not with My Heart You Don't" charted at number 68. A third single, "The Chain Just Broke", failed to chart, and Carlson exited Capitol. Also in 1992, she was nominated for Top New Female Vocalist at the Academy of Country Music Awards, along with Ronna Reeves and Trisha Yearwood, but lost to Trisha.

Christmas Is For You, a Christmas album, was released in 1993 under a small independent label. Carlson produced this album and wrote two songs for the project, "Christmas is for You" and "Mrs. Santa Claus." Both songs were made into music videos, one where her daughter, Cali, appeared in the "Christmas Is For You" video.

== Reunited with Highway 101 ==
Marking Highway 101's Tenth Year Anniversary, Carlson reunited with original members, Curtis Stone and Jack Daniels. They released two albums, Reunited and Latest & Greatest. "Where’d You Get Your Cheatin’ From", "It Must be Love" and "I Just Don't Love the Man" were released as singles (1996 and 1997).

== Present ==
In 2004, when her brother Gary, a Vietnam War veteran, was in the hospital, Carlson was inspired to write a song called "Thank You Vets". After writing the song, she came out of retirement and recorded a new album, penning 10 of the 12 songs. It's About Time (2005) was released under Pandean Records. She toured briefly after recording this album dedicated to our Vietnam Vets, doing mostly benefits for Military Veterans.

Today, Carlson has returned to performing and tours with a backing band called Montana Rising. She is currently represented by Gerald Murray Music, an independent agency which specializes in artist management, booking, tour management and the development of performing artists.

== Discography ==
=== Albums ===
Title	Album details
Love Goes On	Release date: December 14, 1991; Label: Capitol Records
Christmas Is for You	Release date: September 13, 1994; Label: Majestic Records
It's About Time	Release date: June 13, 2006; Label: Pandean Records

=== Singles ===
Year	Single	Peak chart positions		Album
Year	Single	US Country	CAN Country	Album
1983	"You Gotta Get to My Heart (Before You Lay a Hand on Me)"	65	—	—N/a
1983	"I'd Say Yes"	67	—	—N/a
1984	"Can You Fool"	72	—	—N/a
1991	"I'll Start with You"	21	50	Love Goes On
1992	"Not with My Heart You Don't"	68	84	Love Goes On
1992	"The Chain Just Broke"	—	—	Love Goes On
2005	"Thank You Vets"	—	—	It's About Time
2006	"I Knew a Good Thing When I Had it"	—	—	It's About Time
2006	"That Old Glass Case"	—	—	It's About Time
"—" denotes releases that did not chart

=== Music videos ===
Year	Video	Director
1991	"I'll Start with You"	Steven Goldmann
1992	"The Chain Just Broke"	
1993	"Christmas Is for You"	
1993	"Mrs. Santa Claus"	Brent Carpenter
2006	"That Old Glass Case"	

== Awards and nominations ==
=== Academy of Country Music Awards ===
Year	Nominee / work	Award	Result
1992	Paulette Carlson	Top New Female Vocalist	Nominated

=== Grammy Awards ===
Year	Nominee / work	Award	Result
1989	101²	Best Country Performance by a Duo or Group with Vocal	Nominated
1990	"Honky Tonk Heart"	Best Country Performance by a Duo or Group with Vocal	Nominated

=== American Music Awards ===
Year	Nominee / work	Award	Result
1989	Highway 101	Favorite Country Band/Duo/Group	Nominated

=== Academy of Country Music Awards ===
Year	Nominee / work	Award	Result
1988	Highway 101	Top Vocal Group of the Year	Won
1989	Highway 101	Top Vocal Group of the Year	Won
1990	Highway 101	Top Vocal Group of the Year	Nominated

=== Country Music Association Awards ===
Year	Nominee / work	Award	Result
1988	Highway 101	Horizon Award	Nominated
1988	Highway 101	Vocal Group of the Year	Won
1989	Highway 101	Vocal Group of the Year	Won
1990	Highway 101	Vocal Group of the Year	Nominated
