= Highway 101 =

American country music band

- 1980s promotional image depicting Highway 101's original lineup (L-R: Paulette Carlson, Cactus Moser, Curtis Stone, Jack Daniels)

Background information
- Origin: Los Angeles, California, U.S.
- Genre: Country
- Years active: 1986–2010
- Labels: Warner Bros.; Liberty; Intersound; Freefalls; Keytone
- Past members: Paulette Carlson; Jack Daniels; Curtis Stone; Scott "Cactus" Moser; Nikki Nelson; Chrislynn Lee; Charlie White; Justin Weaver; Andy Gurley

Highway 101 was an American country music band founded in 1986 in Los Angeles, California. The initial lineup consisted of Paulette Carlson (lead vocals), Jack Daniels (guitar), Curtis Stone (bass guitar, vocals), and Scott "Cactus" Moser (drums). Prior to the band's founding, Carlson was a solo artist. With her as lead vocalist, the band recorded three albums for Warner Bros. Records Nashville. After Carlson left in 1990 to pursue a solo career, the band recorded a fourth album for Warner with Nikki Nelson on lead vocals before exiting the label. One album each followed on Liberty, Intersound, and Free Falls Records under various lineups.

Highway 101 has released eight studio albums and one greatest hits album, and has charted seventeen singles on the Billboard Hot Country Songs charts. Four of their singles—"Somewhere Tonight", "Cry, Cry, Cry", "(Do You Love Me) Just Say Yes", and "Who's Lonely Now"— went to number one on that chart.

== History ==
Lead vocalist Paulette Carlson founded Highway 101 in 1986 in Los Angeles, California, with guitarist Jack Daniels, bassist Curtis Stone (son of song publisher and musician Cliffie Stone), and drummer Scott "Cactus" Moser, all three of whom were session musicians. Stone and Moser (and Cliffie Stone) had appeared in the 1986 film Back to School as members of a bar band. Before Highway 101, Carlson recorded as a solo singer on RCA Records. She made three appearances on the Hot Country Songs chart for RCA: "You Gotta Get to My Heart (Before You Lay a Hand on Me)", "I'd Say Yes", and "Can You Fool" reached No. 65, No. 67 and No. 72, respectively.

=== 1986–1990 ===
In 1986, the band signed with Warner Bros. Records Nashville, debuting with the single "Some Find Love". However, it failed to chart and was withdrawn due to the band's dissatisfaction with its country pop sound. They followed up in December 1986 with the single "The Bed You Made for Me", which Carlson wrote. The song spent twenty-four weeks on the Hot Country Songs chart, reaching a peak of No. 4. Following it were "Whiskey, If You Were a Woman" at No. 2 and two straight No. 1s: "Somewhere Tonight" (written by Rodney Crowell and Harlan Howard) and "Cry, Cry, Cry". After the chart success, Highway 101 was nominated and won the award for Vocal Group of the Year at the 1988 ACM and CMA Awards.

101² followed in 1988. Its first single, "(Do You Love Me) Just Say Yes". became the band's third straight No. 1 single; following it were the Top 10 hits "All the Reasons Why", "Setting Me Up", and "Honky Tonk Heart", at No. 5, No. 7 and No. 6 respectively. The next year's Paint the Town accounted for the band's final Number One, "Who's Lonely Now", followed by "Walkin', Talkin', Cryin', Barely Beatin' Broken Heart" (originally released by Johnnie Wright) and "This Side of Goodbye". A Greatest Hits album in 1990 included the No. 14 single "Someone Else's Trouble Now".

=== 1990–Present: Departure of Carlson ===
In late 1990, Carlson left the band for a solo career on Capitol Records. Her solo debut album, Love Goes On, produced only one top 40 hit in "I'll Start with You". Carlson's replacement on lead vocals was Nikki Nelson, who first appeared on 1991's Bing Bang Boom. Although this album's title track made the Top 20, the other singles from it were less successful: "The Blame" reached No. 31, "Baby, I'm Missing You" peaked at No. 22, and "Honky Tonk Baby" fell short of the Top 40. Daniels left the band in 1992. After this album, the band left Warner Bros. for Liberty Records. The only release for this label, The New Frontier, included the band's final chart entry, "You Baby You", which peaked at No. 67.

Carlson and Daniels returned in 1996 for the album Reunited, released via Intersound Records. "Where’d You Get Your Cheatin’ From" and "It Must Be Love" were released as singles. In 1998, Carlson and Daniels would both depart Highway 101 once again.

In 1999, Moser (who was absent from the Reunion album) returned and with Stone, reformed Highway 101 with Charlie White and new vocalist Chrislynn Lee. With FreeFalls, an independent record label, Highway 101 released its seventh studio album, Big Sky. The album also included "There Goes My Love", previously recorded with Carlson (1988) and "I Wonder Where the Love Goes", previously recorded with Nelson (1993).

White departed in 2002 and was replaced with Justin Weaver. Lee soon departed as well, and Nelson returned in 2006. In 2007, Weaver departed and was replaced by Andy Gurley. In December 2010, Highway 101 appeared on the Grand Ole Opry and released a special Christmas DVD entitled "Christmas On Highway 101". The new DVD featured professionally filmed live performances and guest appearances by country music notables such as Wynonna Judd, to whom Moser is married.

In August 2012, Moser was involved in a motorcycle accident which resulted in the amputation of his left leg above the knee.

== Members ==
1986–1990	Paulette Carlson - lead vocals, acoustic guitar; Jack Daniels - lead guitar, vocals; Curtis Stone - bass guitar, vocals; Cactus Moser - drums, vocals
1991–1992	Nikki Nelson - lead vocals, acoustic guitar; Jack Daniels - lead guitar, vocals; Curtis Stone - bass guitar, vocals; Cactus Moser - drums, vocals
1993–1994	Nikki Nelson - lead vocals, acoustic guitar; Curtis Stone - bass guitar, vocals; Cactus Moser - drums, vocals
1996–1997	Paulette Carlson - lead vocals, acoustic guitar; Jack Daniels - electric guitar, vocals; Curtis Stone - bass guitar, vocals

1997–2002	Chrislynn Lee - lead vocals, acoustic guitar; Charlie White - electric guitar, vocals; Curtis Stone - bass guitar, vocals; Cactus Moser - drums, vocals
2003–2005	Chrislynn Lee - lead vocals, acoustic guitar; Justin Weaver - electric guitar, vocals; Curtis Stone - bass guitar, vocals; Cactus Moser - drums, vocals
2006–2007	Nikki Nelson - lead vocals, acoustic guitar; Justin Weaver - electric guitar, vocals; Curtis Stone - bass guitar, vocals; Cactus Moser - drums, vocals
2007–2010	Nikki Nelson - lead vocals, acoustic guitar; Andy Gurley - electric guitar, vocals; Curtis Stone - bass guitar, vocals; Cactus Moser - drums, vocals

== Discography ==
Albums

- Highway 101 (1987)
- 101² (1988)
- Paint the Town (1989)
- Bing Bang Boom (1991)
- The New Frontier (1993)
- Reunited (1996)
- Big Sky (2000)
- Christmas on Highway 101 (2010)

=== Billboard number-one hits ===
- "Somewhere Tonight" (2 weeks, 1987)
- "Cry, Cry, Cry" (1 week, 1988)
- "(Do You Love Me) Just Say Yes" (1 week, 1988)
- "Who's Lonely Now" (2 weeks, 1989)

== Awards and nominations ==
=== Grammy Awards ===
Year	Nominee / work	Award	Result
1989	101²	Best Country Performance by a Duo or Group with Vocal	Nominated
1990	"Honky Tonk Heart"	Best Country Performance by a Duo or Group with Vocal	Nominated

=== American Music Awards ===
Year	Nominee / work	Award	Result
1989	Highway 101	Favorite Country Band/Duo/Group	Nominated

=== Academy of Country Music Awards ===
Year	Nominee / work	Award	Result
1988	Highway 101	Top Vocal Group of the Year	Won
1989	Highway 101	Top Vocal Group of the Year	Won
1989	"Cry, Cry, Cry"	Single Record of the Year	Shortlisted
1990	Highway 101	Top Vocal Group of the Year	Nominated
1991	Highway 101	Top Vocal Group of the Year	Shortlisted
1992	Highway 101	Top Vocal Group of the Year	Nominated

=== Country Music Association Awards ===
Year	Nominee / work	Award	Result
1988	Highway 101	Horizon Award	Nominated
1988	Highway 101	Vocal Group of the Year	Won
1989	Highway 101	Vocal Group of the Year	Won
1990	Highway 101	Vocal Group of the Year	Nominated
