= Paul Worley =

American record producer and session guitarist (born 1950)

- Born: February 16, 1950 (age 76)
- Origin: Nashville, Tennessee, U.S.
- Genres: Country
- Occupations: Record producer Guitarist
- Instrument: Guitar
- Years active: 1975-present

Paul Worley (born February 16, 1950 in Nashville) is an American record producer and session guitarist, known primarily for his work in country music. Formerly a vice president at Sony BMG, he later joined the staff of Warner Bros. Records' Nashville division as chief creative officer. Since leaving Warner in the early 2000s, Worley has worked mainly as a record producer for other acts including Big & Rich, as well as an occasional session guitarist. He is mostly known as the co- producer (with Victoria Shaw) of the self-titled debut album of Lady Antebellum (2008) and as one of the producers of their second album, Need You Now (2010). He also discovered the Dixie Chicks and with Blake Chancey, co-produced their first two albums.

== Early life ==
Worley was born in Nashville in 1950. He graduated from Vanderbilt University with a degree in philosophy.

== Musical career ==
=== Producer and session musician ===
Paul Worley began his career in the late 1970s as a session guitarist in Nashville. On the recommendation of record producer Jim Ed Norman, he first played guitar on albums by Janie Fricke, Eddy Raven, and Mickey Gilley. Worley's first production credits included Riders in the Sky's Three on the Trail (1976) and Gary Morris' Why Lady Why (1983). Throughout the 1980s and 1990s, Worley has produced or co-produced several country music albums, primarily by country music artists.

Through his association with the Dixie Chicks, Worley earned two Grammy Awards for Best Country Album, both times for albums recorded by the Dixie Chicks: 1998's Wide Open Spaces and 1999's Fly. Worley also played guitar on the Chicks' debut single "I Can Love You Better". After becoming chief creative officer at Warner Bros. Records in 2002, Worley helped sign Big & Rich, a country music duo composed of Big Kenny and John Rich.

Worley left Warner Bros. after the label did not sign Lady Antebellum, despite Worley's encouragement. When the band signed with Capitol Records, Worley left Warner Bros. in order to produce the band. In early 2011, Worley shared in four wins with Lady Antebellum at the 2010 Grammy Awards: Best Country Album, Record of the Year, Song of The Year, and Best Country Song. In addition to Morris, the Dixie Chicks, and Lady Antebellum, Worley has produced or co-produced albums and singles by Marie Osmond, The Desert Rose Band, Highway 101, Martina McBride, the Nitty Gritty Dirt Band, Collin Raye, Sara Evans, The Band Perry, and Jennette McCurdy.

=== Skyline Music Publishing ===
Along with Wally Wilson and two other partners, Worley founded a publishing company, Skyline Music Publishing. Among the songwriters that have signed to Skyline are Hugh Prestwood (who wrote Randy Travis' Number One single "Hard Rock Bottom of Your Heart"), Tammy Hyler (who has written for Collin Raye), and Russ Titelman. In 2012, Skyline writer Jon Stone co-wrote the SESAC Song Of The Year, "A Woman Like You," recorded by Curb Records artist Lee Brice. Also in 2012, Skyline writers The Henningsens were awarded BMI awards for two singles recorded by Valory Music Group's The Band Perry, "You Lie" and "All Your Life." Worley also produced The Henningsen's debut album, to be released by Sony Music Nashville in 2013.

=== Skyville Records and artist development ===
In 2010, Worley, Wilson, and Skyline partner Glen Morgan formed the independent record label Skyville Records. The label's first release was Stealing Angels later that year. In 2011, Skyville signed a distribution deal with Sony Music Nashville. Skyville specializes in artist development, working with up-and-coming talent in production, music publishing, and artist management.
