= Lee Greenwood discography =

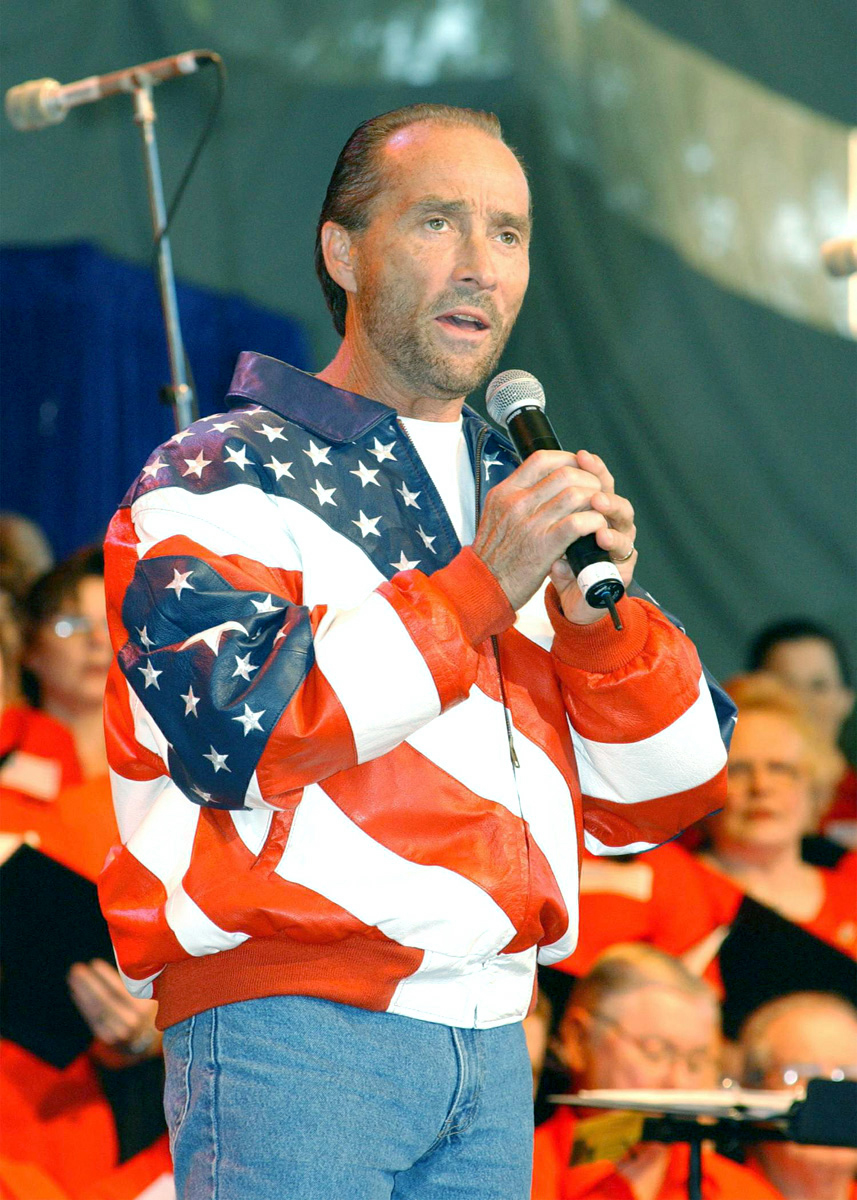
- Greenwood performing in 2005
- Studio albums: 22
- Compilation albums: 7
- Singles: 40
- Music videos: 5

Lee Greenwood is an American country music singer. His discography includes 22 studio albums, eight compilation albums, 40 singles (counting his signature song "God Bless the USA", which was released three times), and five music videos. Of his singles, seven have reached Number One on the Billboard Hot Country Songs charts: "Somebody's Gonna Love You" and "Going, Going Gone" from 1983, "Dixie Road" and "I Don't Mind the Thorns (If You're the Rose)" from 1985, "Don't Underestimate My Love for You", "Hearts Aren't Made to Break (They're Made to Love)" and "Mornin' Ride" from 1986.

== Studio albums ==
=== 1980s ===
Title	Album details	Peak chart positions			Certifications
Title	Album details	US Country	US	CAN Country	Certifications
Inside Out	Release date: April 1, 1982; Label: MCA Records	12	—	—	US: Gold
Somebody's Gonna Love You	Release date: March 3, 1983; Label: MCA Records	3	73	—	US: Gold
You've Got a Good Love Comin'	Release date: May 17, 1984; Label: MCA Records	6	150	15	US: Gold
Meant for Each Other (with Barbara Mandrell)	Release date: August 6, 1984; Label: MCA Records	5	89	—	
Streamline	Release date: August 5, 1985; Label: MCA Records	1	—	—	
Christmas to Christmas	Release date: September 26, 1985; Label: MCA Records	29	—	—	
Love Will Find Its Way to You	Release date: August 11, 1986; Label: MCA Records	10	—	—	
If There's Any Justice	Release date: June 15, 1987; Label: MCA Records	38	—	—	
This Is My Country	Release date: May 16, 1988; Label: MCA Records	25	—	—	
If Only for One Night	Release date: May 26, 1989; Label: MCA Records	66	—	—	
"—" denotes releases that did not chart

=== 1990s ===
Title	Album details	Peak chart positions		Certifications
Title	Album details	US Country	US	Certifications
Holdin' a Good Hand	Release date: July 10, 1990; Label: Capitol Nashville	69	—	
A Perfect 10	Release date: April 30, 1991; Label: Capitol Nashville	38	—	
When You're in Love	Release date: August 27, 1991; Label: Capitol Nashville	—	—	
American Patriot	Release date: April 21, 1992; Label: Liberty Records	44	172	US: Platinum
Love's on the Way	Release date: August 11, 1992; Label: Liberty Records	—	—	
Totally Devoted to You	Release date: June 9, 1995; Label: Arrival Records	—	—	
Wounded Heart	Release date: April 7, 1998; Label: Kardina Records	—	—	
"—" denotes releases that did not chart

=== 2000s ===
Title	Album details	Peak positions
Title	Album details	US Country
Same River Different Bridge	Release date: May 30, 2000; Label: Free Falls	—
Good Old Country	Release date: July 25, 2000; Label: St. Clair	66
Have Yourself a Merry Little Christmas	Release date: August 14, 2001; Label: Country Crossing	35
Inspirational Songs	Release date: March 19, 2002; Label: Curb Records	—
Stronger Than Time	Release date: August 26, 2003; Label: Curb Records	—
"—" denotes releases that did not chart

== Compilation albums ==
Title	Album details	Peak chart positions		Certifications
Title	Album details	US Country	US	Certifications
Greatest Hits	Release date: September 16, 1985; Label: MCA Records	4	163	US: Platinum
Greatest Hits Volume Two	Release date: September 19, 1988; Label: MCA Records	27	—	
The Best of Lee Greenwood	Release date: August 2, 1993; Label: Liberty Records	—	—	
Super Hits	Release date: March 19, 1996; Label: Epic Records	—	—	
God Bless the USA: The Best of Lee Greenwood	Release date: July 2, 1996; Label: Curb Records	—	—	
20th Century Masters: The Millennium Collection	Release date: January 15, 2002; Label: MCA Nashville	—	—	
The Definitive Collection	Release date: June 6, 2006; Label: MCA Nashville	—	—	
10 Great Songs	Release date: June 28, 2011; Label: MCA Nashville	63	—	
"—" denotes releases that did not chart

== Singles ==
=== 1980s ===
Year	Single	Peak chart positions				Certifications	Album
Year	Single	US Country	US	US AC	CAN Country	Certifications	Album
1981	"It Turns Me Inside Out"	17	—	—	—		Inside Out
1982	"Ring on Her Finger, Time on Her Hands"	5	—	—	2		Inside Out
1982	"She's Lying"	7	—	—	6		Inside Out
1982	"Ain't No Trick (It Takes Magic)"	7	—	—	27		Inside Out
1983	"I.O.U."	6	53	4	4		Somebody's Gonna Love You
1983	"Somebody's Gonna Love You"	1	96	15	2		Somebody's Gonna Love You
1983	"Going, Going, Gone"	1	—	—	1		Somebody's Gonna Love You
1984	"God Bless the U.S.A."	7	—	26	—	US: 2× Platinum	You've Got a Good Love Comin'
1984	"To Me" (with Barbara Mandrell)	3	—	24	5		Meant for Each Other
1984	"Fool's Gold"	3	—	—	5		You've Got a Good Love Comin'
1984	"You've Got a Good Love Comin'"	9	—	—	6		You've Got a Good Love Comin'
1985	"It Should Have Been Love by Now" (with Barbara Mandrell)	19	—	35	12		Meant for Each Other
1985	"Dixie Road"	1	—	—	1		Greatest Hits
1985	"I Don't Mind the Thorns (If You're the Rose)"	1	—	—	1		Streamline
1985	"Don't Underestimate My Love for You"	1	—	—	1		Streamline
1986	"Hearts Aren't Made to Break (They're Made to Love)"	1	—	—	1		Streamline
1986	"Didn't We"	10	—	—	10		Love Will Find Its Way to You
1986	"Mornin' Ride"	1	—	—	1		Love Will Find Its Way to You
1987	"Someone"	5	—	—	3		If There's Any Justice
1987	"If There's Any Justice"	9	—	—	24		If There's Any Justice
1987	"Touch and Go Crazy"	5	—	—	3		If There's Any Justice
1988	"I Still Believe"	12	—	—	18		This Is My Country
1988	"You Can't Fall in Love When You're Cryin'"	20	—	—	21		This Is My Country
1989	"I'll Be Lovin' You"	16	—	—	19		This Is My Country
1989	"I Love the Way He Left You"	43	—	—	—		If Only for One Night
1989	"I Go Crazy"	55	—	—	47		If Only for One Night
"—" denotes releases that did not chart

=== 1990s and 2000s ===
Year	Single	Peak chart positions				Album
Year	Single	US Country	US	US AC	CAN Country	Album
1990	"Holdin' a Good Hand"	2	—	—	2	Holdin' a Good Hand
1990	"We've Got It Made"	14	—	—	15	Holdin' a Good Hand
1991	"Just Like Me"	52	—	—	42	Holdin' a Good Hand
1991	"Hopelessly Yours" (with Suzy Bogguss)	12	—	—	4	A Perfect 10
1991	"Between a Rock and a Heartache"	46	—	—	22	When You're in Love
1992	"If You'll Let This Fool Back In"	58	—	—	81	When You're in Love
1992	"Before I'm Ever Over You"	73	—	—	79	Love's on the Way
1992	"I Never Thought Your Memory Would Ever Go This Far"	—	—	—	—	Love's on the Way
2001	"God Bless the USA" (re-release)	16	16	12	×	God Bless the USA: The Best of Lee Greenwood
2002	"Rocks That You Can't Move"	—	—	—	×	Stronger Than Time
2003	"God Bless the USA 2003"	—	—	—	×	Stronger Than Time
2003	"When a Woman's in Love"	—	—	—	×	Stronger Than Time
2008	"USA Today"	—	—	—	—	Non-album singles
2009	"Why Lie"	—	—	—	—	Non-album singles
"—" denotes releases that did not chart "×" indicates that no relevant chart existed or was archived

== Music videos ==
Year	Video
1983	"I.O.U."
1984	"God Bless the U.S.A."
1984	"You've Got a Good Love Comin'"
1989	"Home to Alaska"
1991	"Hopelessly Yours"
