= 1988 in country music =

This is a list of notable events in country music that took place in the year 1988.

== Events ==
- May 21 – Country music stars highlight a concert at Madison Square Garden in New York City. Featured: Alabama, The Judds, George Strait and Randy Travis.
- December –
  - Record producer Jimmy Bowen establishes the Universal Records label.
  - LS Records releases "Spelling on the Stone", a song about Elvis Presley without an artist credit. The song's lyrics, which call the singer's 1977 death into question, are sung by a vocalist whom many believe to be Presley himself.

=== No dates ===
- Time-Life Records releases the first volume of its "Country USA" series. The series, which would eventually include 23 volumes, each chronicles one year per volume – 1950 through 1972. Each volume – offered on two record albums, or one cassette or compact disc – contains liner notes from some of country music's most respected historians. In many cases, the songs offered on each volume represented the first time they had ever been re-released on compact disc. "Country USA" was offered through television and magazine advertisements.
- The Country Music Association Awards introduced a new award, Vocal Event of the Year, awarding collaborative efforts by two or more artists who normally don't work together (previously such efforts had to be included with Best Duo or Group nominations). The first recipient was the group of Emmylou Harris, Dolly Parton, and Linda Ronstadt for their Trio album.
- MTM Records is sold and disestablished after four years. During its short stay in the music business, two songs released by MTM will top the Billboard Hot Country Singles chart: Judy Rodman's "Until I Met You" (1986) and S-K-O's "Baby's Got a New Baby" (1987).
- Real Country, a 24-hour satellite music network focusing on classic country and neotraditional country, is planned for a 1989 launch by country star Buck Owens out of his Phoenix Arizona radio studios and carried by the Satellite Music Network. It is heard primarily in smaller- and medium-sized markets. Real Country was later sold to ABC Disney which then moved the operations to its radio headquarters in Dallas, Texas. Real Country was later sold to Citadel and is now owned and distributed by Cumulus Media.

== Top hits of the year ==
=== Singles released by American artists ===
US	CAN	Single	Artist
1	1	Addicted	Dan Seals
9	5	Always Late with Your Kisses	Dwight Yoakam
8	—	Americana	Moe Bandy
5	—	Another Place, Another Time	Don Williams
1	3	Baby Blue	George Strait
2	1	Baby I'm Yours	Steve Wariner
15	33	The Best I Know How	The Statler Brothers
10	18	Blue Love	The O'Kanes
5	8	Blue to the Bone	Sweethearts of the Rodeo
1	2	The Bluest Eyes in Texas	Restless Heart
10	10	Boogie Woogie Fiddle Country Blues	Charlie Daniels Band
4	4	Button Off My Shirt	Ronnie Milsap
9	12	Chill Factor	Merle Haggard
6	3	Chiseled in Stone	Vern Gosdin
1	1	Cry, Cry, Cry	Highway 101
4	8	Crying Shame	Michael Johnson
1	1	Darlene	T. Graham Brown
7	5	Desperately	Don Williams
4	13	Do You Believe Me Now	Vern Gosdin
1	1	(Do You Love Me) Just Say Yes	Highway 101
1	2	Don't Close Your Eyes	Keith Whitley
10	—	Don't Give Candy to a Stranger	Larry Boone
1	1	Don't We All Have the Right	Ricky Van Shelton
1	1	Eighteen Wheels and a Dozen Roses	Kathy Mattea
52	18	Every Step of the Way	The Wagoneers
11	3	Everybody's Sweetheart	Vince Gill
1	1	Face to Face	Alabama
6	3	The Factory	Kenny Rogers
1	1	Fallin' Again	Alabama
1	1	Famous Last Words of a Fool	George Strait
4	2	The Gift	The McCarters
2	1	Give a Little Love	The Judds
8	8	Givers and Takers	S-K-B
1	3	Goin' Gone	Kathy Mattea
1	1	Gonna Take a Lot of River	The Oak Ridge Boys
7	11	Goodbye Time	Conway Twitty
4	13	Heaven Can't Be Found	Hank Williams Jr.
1	1	He's Back and I'm Blue	The Desert Rose Band
14	12	High Ridin' Heroes	David Lynn Jones with Waylon Jennings
1	1	Honky Tonk Moon	Randy Travis
1	1	I Can't Get Close Enough	Exile
1	1	I Couldn't Leave You If I Tried	Rodney Crowell
12	14	I Didn't (Every Chance I Had)	Johnny Rodriguez
8	34	I Don't Have Far to Fall	Skip Ewing
28	16	I Give You Music	The McCarters
7	44	I Have You	Glen Campbell
1	1	I Know How He Feels	Reba McEntire
2	1	I Should Be with You	Steve Wariner
12	18	I Still Believe	Lee Greenwood
1	1	I Told You So	Randy Travis
1	1	I Wanna Dance with You	Eddie Rabbitt
18	41	I Want a Love Like That	Judy Rodman
7	19	I Will Whisper Your Name	Michael Johnson
5	2	I Wish That I Could Fall in Love Today	Barbara Mandrell
1	10	I Won't Take Less Than Your Love	Tanya Tucker with Paul Davis and Paul Overstreet
9	7	I Wouldn't Be a Man	Don Williams
1	1	I'll Always Come Back	K. T. Oslin
6	12	I'll Give You All My Love Tonight	The Bellamy Brothers
1	1	I'll Leave This World Loving You	Ricky Van Shelton
5	17	I'll Pin a Note on Your Pillow	Billy Joe Royal
1	1	I'm Gonna Get You	Eddy Raven
13	33	I'm Gonna Love Her on the Radio	Charley Pride
3	4	I'm Gonna Miss You, Girl	Michael Martin Murphey
18	6	I'm Tired	Ricky Skaggs
2	1	I've Been Lookin'	Nitty Gritty Dirt Band
1	—	If It Don't Come Easy	Tanya Tucker
10	9	If My Heart Had Windows	Patty Loveless
16	37	If Ole Hank Could Only See Us Now	Waylon Jennings
8	22	If the South Woulda Won	Hank Williams Jr.
1	1	If You Ain't Lovin' (You Ain't Livin')	George Strait
1	1	If You Change Your Mind	Rosanne Cash
67	9	If You're Gonna Tell Me Lies	Rosemary Sharp
17	15	It Keeps Right on Hurtin'	Billy Joe Royal
8	5	It's Only Make Believe	Ronnie McDowell
1	1	It's Such a Small World	Rodney Crowell and Rosanne Cash
1	1	Joe Knows How to Live	Eddy Raven
5	9	Just Lovin' You	The O'Kanes
9	3	Just One Kiss	Exile
4	4	The Last Resort	T. Graham Brown
9	7	Letter Home	The Forester Sisters
1	1	Life Turned Her That Way	Ricky Van Shelton
18	—	A Little Bit Closer	Tom Wopat
2	—	A Little Bit in Love	Patty Loveless
20	—	Louisiana Rain	John Wesley Ryles
3	9	Love Helps Those	Paul Overstreet
4	3	Love of a Lifetime	Larry Gatlin and the Gatlin Brothers
1	1	Love Will Find Its Way to You	Reba McEntire
5	5	Lyin' in His Arms Again	The Forester Sisters
5	4	Mama Knows	Shenandoah
14	16	Midnight Highway	Southern Pacific
13	11	Money	K. T. Oslin
11	5	My Baby's Gone	Sawyer Brown
2	1	New Shade of Blue	Southern Pacific
7	2	No More One More Time	Jo-El Sonnier
22	7	Nobody's Angel	Crystal Gayle
5	—	Oh What a Love	Nitty Gritty Dirt Band
2	12	Old Folks	Ronnie Milsap & Mike Reid
1	1	One Friend	Dan Seals
2	15	One Step Forward	The Desert Rose Band
4	5	One True Love	The O'Kanes
11	18	Only Love Can Save Me Now	Crystal Gayle
10	7	Out of Sight and on My Mind	Billy Joe Royal
6	2	Please, Please Baby	Dwight Yoakam
9	4	Real Good Feel Good Song	Mel McDaniel
9	19	Rebels Without a Clue	The Bellamy Brothers
1	2	Runaway Train	Rosanne Cash
5	2	Santa Fe	The Bellamy Brothers
5	11	Satisfy You	Sweethearts of the Rodeo
9	19	Saturday Night Special	Conway Twitty
1	2	Set 'Em Up Joe	Vern Gosdin
9	36	She Doesn't Cry Anymore	Shenandoah
17	8	She's No Lady	Lyle Lovett
81	9	She's Sittin' Pretty	Billy Parker
5	29	Shouldn't It Be Easier Than This	Charley Pride
16	32	Some Old Side Road	Keith Whitley
8	3	Spanish Eyes	Willie Nelson with Julio Iglesias
5	47	Still Within the Sound of My Voice	Glen Campbell
7	36	Strangers Again	Holly Dunn
1	1	Streets of Bakersfield	Dwight Yoakam & Buck Owens
1	2	Strong Enough to Bend	Tanya Tucker
2	2	Summer Wind	The Desert Rose Band
5	9	Sunday Kind of Love	Reba McEntire
8	8	Sure Thing	Foster & Lloyd
16	23	Talkin' to Myself Again	Tammy Wynette
4	1	Talkin' to the Wrong Man	Michael Martin Murphey (with Ryan Murphey)
9	5	Tear-Stained Letter	Jo-El Sonnier
8	2	Tell Me True	Juice Newton
1	2	A Tender Lie	Restless Heart
1	1	Tennessee Flat Top Box	Rosanne Cash
18	—	Texas in 1880	Foster & Lloyd
17	10	Thanks Again	Ricky Skaggs
6	4	That's My Job	Conway Twitty
9	8	That's That	Michael Johnson
5	6	That's What Your Love Does to Me	Holly Dunn
2	1	This Missin' You Heart of Mine	Sawyer Brown
5	6	Timeless and True Love	The McCarters
1	1	Too Gone Too Long	Randy Travis
5	3	Touch and Go Crazy	Lee Greenwood
5	21	True Heart	The Oak Ridge Boys
1	5	Turn It Loose	The Judds
1	1	Twinkle, Twinkle Lucky Star	Merle Haggard
4	13	Untold Stories	Kathy Mattea
1	1	The Wanderer	Eddie Rabbitt
1	1	We Believe in Happy Endings	Earl Thomas Conley with Emmylou Harris
7	2	We Must Be Doin' Somethin' Right	Eddie Rabbitt
6	17	What Do You Want from Me This Time	Foster & Lloyd
1	2	What She Is (Is a Woman in Love)	Earl Thomas Conley
1	1	Wheels	Restless Heart
26	16	When You Put Your Heart in It	Kenny Rogers
1	1	When You Say Nothing at All	Keith Whitley
1	1	Where Do the Nights Go	Ronnie Milsap
9	7	Wilder Days	Baillie & the Boys
6	8	Wildflowers	Dolly Parton, Linda Ronstadt, Emmylou Harris
4	6	Workin' Man (Nowhere to Go)	Nitty Gritty Dirt Band
72	10	You Are My Angel	Billy Parker
20	21	You Can't Fall in Love When You're Cryin'	Lee Greenwood
2	2	Young Country	Hank Williams Jr.
17	—	Your Memory Wins Again	Skip Ewing

=== Singles released by Canadian artists ===
US	CAN	Single	Artist
—	8	Angelina	George Fox
—	7	Cheater's Moon	Carroll Baker
—	15	Cinderella/Gingerbread Man	Dick Damron
—	18	The Circle of Wood	Wayne Pronger
61	10	Do You Have Any Doubts	Alibi
—	8	Fifty Years Ago	Ian Tyson
—	17	The Gift	Ian Tyson
—	12	Give In	Terry Carisse
—	8	Gone So Long	The Good Brothers
—	10	Highway to Heaven	Stoker Bros
—	14	I Still Think of You	Colleen Peterson & Gilles Godard
21	7	I'm Down to My Last Cigarette	k.d. lang
—	17	If You're Up for Love	Ronnie Prophet
—	10	Isn't That the Strangest Thing	Anita Perras & Tim Taylor
—	9	Leanna	Ken Harnden
—	15	Listening to the Singer	Cindi Cain
—	15	The Music Still in Me	Cindi Cain
—	9	One Smokey Rose	Anita Perras
—	9	The Rhythm of Romance	Michelle Wright
—	8	She Knows I Can't Say No	Ken Harnden
—	14	Straight to Your Heart	Mercey Brothers
—	10	Thank You for Being My Friend	The Ellis Family Band
—	8	Thought Leaving Would Be Easy	Terry Carisse
—	1	Til I Find My Love	Family Brown
—	7	Town of Tears	Family Brown
—	14	You Won't Fool This Fool This Time	The Good Brothers
—	7	You've Lost That Lovin' Feelin'	Carroll Baker

== Top new album releases ==
US	Album	Artist	Record label
8	101²	Highway 101	Warner Bros.
1	Alabama Live	Alabama	RCA
25	All Keyed Up	Becky Hobbs	MTM
4	Big Dreams in a Small Town	Restless Heart	RCA
1	Buenas Noches from a Lonely Room	Dwight Yoakam	Reprise
7	Chiseled in Stone	Vern Gosdin	Columbia
22	Come as You Were	T. Graham Brown	Capitol
12	Comin' Home to Stay	Ricky Skaggs	Epic
7	Copperhead Road	Steve Earle	MCA
8	Diamonds & Dirt	Rodney Crowell	Columbia
8	Don't Close Your Eyes	Keith Whitley	RCA
1	Greatest Hits	The Judds	Curb/RCA
16	Homesick Heroes	The Charlie Daniels Band	Epic
7	Honky Tonk Angel	Patty Loveless	MCA
20	I Should Be with You	Steve Wariner	MCA
1	If You Ain't Lovin', You Ain't Livin'	George Strait	MCA
1	Loving Proof	Ricky Van Shelton	Columbia
9	Monongahela	The Oak Ridge Boys	MCA
1	Old 8×10	Randy Travis	Warner Bros.
11	One Time, One Night	Sweethearts of the Rodeo	Columbia
12	Pontiac	Lyle Lovett	Curb/MCA
6	Rage On	Dan Seals	Capitol
1	Reba	Reba McEntire	MCA
11	River of Time	Michael Martin Murphey	Warner Bros.
9	Shadowland	k.d. lang	Sire
21	The Statlers Greatest Hits	The Statler Brothers	Mercury
9	Strong Enough to Bend	Tanya Tucker	Capitol
25	This Is My Country	Lee Greenwood	MCA
2	This Woman	K. T. Oslin	RCA
21	Tired of the Runnin'	The O'Kanes	Columbia
6	What a Wonderful World	Willie Nelson	Columbia
1	Wild Streak	Hank Williams Jr.	Curb/Warner Bros.

=== Other top albums ===
US	Album	Artist	Record label
51	10	John Anderson	MCA
26	Across the Rio Grande	Holly Dunn	MTM
46	Alive & Well	Larry Gatlin and the Gatlin Brothers	Columbia
29	All in Love	Marie Osmond	Capitol/Curb
29	As I Am	Anne Murray	Capitol
36	The Best of Eddy Raven	Eddy Raven	RCA
60	Brand New	Gary Stewart	Hightone
52	Chasing Rainbows	Mickey Gilley	Airborne
61	A Christmas Tradition, Vol. II	Various Artists	Warner Bros.
29	The Coast of Colorado	Skip Ewing	MCA
56	Every Christmas	Gary Morris	Warner Bros.
33	Exchange of Hearts	David Slater	Capitol
36	Full Circle	Waylon Jennings	MCA
36	The Gift	The McCarters	Warner Bros.
66	Greatest Hits	Kenny Rogers	RCA
27	Greatest Hits Volume Two	Lee Greenwood	MCA
33	The Heart of It All	Earl Thomas Conley	RCA
49	Higher Ground	John Denver	Windstar
37	Hot Dog!	Buck Owens	Capitol
51	I Guess I Just Missed You	Canyon	16th Avenue
52	I Never Made a Record I Didn't Like	Ray Stevens	MCA
34	I Wanna Dance With You	Eddie Rabbitt	RCA
35	I'll Be Your Jukebox Tonight	Barbara Mandrell	Capitol
36	I'm Gonna Love Her on the Radio	Charley Pride	16th Avenue
45	I'm Still Missing You	Ronnie McDowell	Curb
33	If My Heart Had Windows	Patty Loveless	MCA
64	Just Enough Love	Ray Price	Step One
58	Light Years	Glen Campbell	MCA
27	Little Love Affairs	Nanci Griffith	MCA
60	Live at the Opry	Patsy Cline	MCA
62	Making Believe	Conway Twitty & Loretta Lynn	MCA
64	New Faces of Country	Various Artists	K-Tel
28	No Regrets	Moe Bandy	Curb
63	Nobody's Angel	Crystal Gayle	Warner Bros.
51	Now You're Talkin'	Mel McDaniel	Capitol
43	One Fair Summer Evening	Nanci Griffith	MCA
45	Rebels Without a Clue	The Bellamy Brothers	Curb/MCA
26	Running	The Desert Rose Band	Curb/MCA
64	Saddle the Wind	Janie Frickie	Columbia
30	Sincerely	The Forester Sisters	Warner Bros.
28	Still in Your Dreams	Conway Twitty	MCA
47	Stout & High	The Wagoneers	A&M
47	Swingin' Doors, Sawdust Floors	Larry Boone	Mercury
39	View from the House	Kim Carnes	MCA
48	Water from the Wells of Home	Johnny Cash	Mercury
34	Western Standard Time	Asleep at the Wheel	Epic
33	Wide Open	Sawyer Brown	Capitol/Curb
63	Who Was That Stranger	Loretta Lynn	MCA
33	Workin' Band	Nitty Gritty Dirt Band	Warner Bros.
27	Zuma	Southern Pacific	Warner Bros.

== On television ==
=== Regular series ===
- Dolly (1987–1988, ABC)
- Hee Haw (1969–1993, syndicated)

== Births ==
- March 24 – Blanco Brown, country rap/trap performer best known for 2019's "The Git Up."
- March 30 – Jordan Davis, singer of the 2010s ("Singles You Up")
- April 29 – Michael Ray, singer-songwriter known for his 2015 debut hit "Kiss You in the Morning".
- May 24 – Billy Gilman, the youngest artist to ever have a country hit record (2000's "One Voice").
- July 20 – Julianne Hough, rising country music star and professional dancer, best known for her appearances on Dancing with the Stars.
- August 21 – Kacey Musgraves, rising country music star of the 2010s.
- November 17 – Reid Perry, member of The Band Perry.

== Deaths ==
- August 24 – Nat Stuckey, 54, singer-songwriter whose biggest hit-making time was the 1960s and 1970s (lung cancer).
- September 20 – Leon McAuliffe, 71, prominent member of Bob Wills' Texas Playboys and a star in his own right.
- December 6 – Roy Orbison, 52, American singer-songwriter and a pioneer of rock and roll.

== Hall of Fame inductees ==
=== Country Music Hall of Fame inductees ===
- Loretta Lynn (1932–2022)
- Roy Rogers (1911–1998)

=== Canadian Country Music Hall of Fame inductees ===
- Jack Feeney

== Major awards ==
=== Grammy Awards ===
- Best Female Country Vocal Performance – "Hold Me", K. T. Oslin
- Best Male Country Vocal Performance – Old 8×10, Randy Travis
- Best Country Performance by a Duo or Group with Vocal – "Give a Little Love". The Judds
- Best Country Collaboration with Vocals – "Crying", Roy Orbison and k.d. lang
- Best Country Instrumental Performance – "Sugarfoot Rag", Asleep at the Wheel
- Best Country Song – "Hold Me", K. T. Oslin
- Best Bluegrass Recording – "Southern Flavor", Bill Monroe

=== Juno Awards ===
- Country Male Vocalist of the Year – Murray McLauchlan
- Country Female Vocalist of the Year – k.d. lang
- Country Group or Duo of the Year – Family Brown

=== Academy of Country Music ===
- Entertainer of the Year – Hank Williams Jr.
- Song of the Year – "Eighteen Wheels and a Dozen Roses", Charles Nelson and Paul Nelson (Performer: Kathy Mattea)
- Single of the Year – "Eighteen Wheels and a Dozen Roses," Kathy Mattea
- Album of the Year – This Woman, K. T. Oslin
- Top Male Vocalist – George Strait
- Top Female Vocalist – K. T. Oslin
- Top Vocal Duo – The Judds
- Top Vocal Group – Highway 101
- Top New Male Vocalist – Rodney Crowell
- Top New Female Vocalist – Suzy Bogguss
- Video of the Year – "Young Country", Hank Williams Jr. (Director: Bill Fishman)

=== ARIA Awards ===
(presented in Sydney on February 29, 1988)

- Best Country Album – This Town (Flying Emus)
- ARIA Hall of Fame – Slim Dusty

=== Canadian Country Music Association ===
- Entertainer of the Year – k.d. lang
- Male Artist of the Year – Ian Tyson
- Female Artist of the Year – k.d. lang
- Group of the Year – Family Brown
- SOCAN Song of the Year – "One Smokey Rose", Tim Taylor (Performer: Anita Perras)
- Single of the Year – "One Smokey Rose", Anita Perras
- Album of the Year – Shadowland, k.d. lang
- Top Selling Album – Always & Forever, Randy Travis
- Vista Rising Star Award – Blue Rodeo
- Duo of the Year – Anita Perras and Tim Taylor

=== Country Music Association ===
- Entertainer of the Year – Hank Williams Jr.
- Song of the Year – "80's Ladies", K. T. Oslin (Performer: K. T. Oslin)
- Single of the Year – "Eighteen Wheels and a Dozen Roses", Kathy Mattea
- Album of the Year – Born to Boogie, Hank Williams Jr.
- Male Vocalist of the Year – Randy Travis
- Female Vocalist of the Year – K. T. Oslin
- Vocal Duo of the Year – The Judds
- Vocal Group of the Year – Highway 101
- Horizon Award – Ricky Van Shelton
- Vocal Event of the Year – Emmylou Harris, Dolly Parton, and Linda Ronstadt
- Musician of the Year – Chet Atkins

== Other links ==
- Country Music Association
- Inductees of the Country Music Hall of Fame
