= Greatest Hits Volume Two (Lee Greenwood album) =

Greatest hits album by Lee Greenwood
- Released: September 19, 1988
- Genre: Country
- Length: 37:52
- Label: MCA
- Producer: Jerry Crutchfield; Jimmy Bowen; Lee Greenwood

Lee Greenwood chronology
This Is My Country (1988)	Greatest Hits Volume Two (1988)	If Only for One Night (1989)

Greatest Hits Volume Two is the second compilation album by American country music artist Lee Greenwood. It was released on September 19. 1988 via MCA Records.

== Track listing ==
No.	Title	Writer(s)	Length
1.	"I Don't Mind the Thorns (If You're the Rose)"	Jan Buckingham, Steve Young	3:21
2.	"Don't Underestimate My Love for You"	Dave Loggins, Steve Dorff, Steve Diamond	3:02
3.	"Hearts Aren't Made to Break (They're Made to Love)"	Roger Murrah, Steve Dean	2:59
4.	"Didn't We"	Troy Seals, Graham Lyle	4:00
5.	"Mornin' Ride"	Steve Bogard, Jeff Tweel	3:21
6.	"Someone"	Steve Dorff, Charlie Black, Austin Roberts	3:07
7.	"If There's Any Justice"	Tony Colton, Michael Noble, C. Michael Spriggs	2:52
8.	"Touch and Go Crazy"	Tom Shapiro, Michael Garvin, Bucky Jones	2:52
9.	"I Still Believe"	Doug Johnson	3:41
10.	"You Can't Fall in Love When You're Cryin'"	Lee Greenwood	3:50
11.	"God Bless the U.S.A."	Greenwood	3:10

== Chart performance ==
Chart (1988)	Peak position
US Top Country Albums (Billboard)	27
