= Dolly (1987 TV series) =

American variety show

- Promotional poster for the series
- Created by: Dolly Parton; Sandy Gallin
- Starring: Dolly Parton
- Opening theme: "Baby I'm Burnin'" and "Hoedown-Showdown" by Dolly Parton
- Country of origin: United States
- No. of episodes: 22

Production
- Producer: Nick Vanoff
- Running time: 60 minutes
- Production company: Sandollar Productions

Original release
- Network: ABC
- Release: September 27, 1987 – May 7, 1988

Related
- Dolly (1976)

Dolly is an American variety show starring Dolly Parton that aired on ABC from September 27, 1987, to May 7, 1988. Guest stars included Tammy Wynette, Merle Haggard, Tyne Daly, Bruce Willis, Emmylou Harris, Linda Ronstadt, Tom Petty, Juice Newton, Kermit the Frog, Miss Piggy, Tom Selleck, the Neville Brothers, Dudley Moore, and Oprah Winfrey. Tyne Daly's appearance on the show, in which she sang a duet with Parton, directly led to Daly being cast in the lead role in the 1989 Broadway production of Gypsy.

== Production ==
On March 23, 1987, ABC-TV announced that it had signed Parton to star in a one-hour variety show set to begin airing in the fall. Banking on Parton's talent and appeal, ABC reportedly paid her US$44,000,000 (equivalent to $124,692,442.88 in 2025) for a two-year contract. To bolster the odds they brought in veteran variety show writers Buddy Sheffield, John Aylesworth, Jack Burns and producer Nick Vanoff. Parton also hired then-relatively-unknown Brett Butler as one of the writers. Bruce Vilanch and Fannie Flagg were also on the writing staff. The series began production on August 14 and the first episode premiered on September 27, ranking in the top five of the Nielsen ratings.

The show was an attempt at a traditional variety show, featuring music, comedy skits and various guest stars. It had been roughly a decade since the last successful variety shows (The Carol Burnett Show, The Sonny & Cher Comedy Hour, and Cher) had gone off the air, and it was regarded as a gamble to try to revive the genre. In 1976, Parton had starred in a successful syndicated variety show, also entitled Dolly, that she left after one season due to overwork and creative disputes; ABC offered Parton more creative control for this series and promoted it as "Dolly... Dolly's way."

Though most of the show's episodes were filmed at ABC's studio in Los Angeles, a number of special episodes were filmed on location, including Hawaii, New Orleans, Nashville, and a Thanksgiving episode in Parton's hometown of Sevierville, Tennessee.

Following a steady decline in ratings, ABC-TV announced that it had canceled the series on May 23, 1988, 16 days after the last episode aired.

== Ratings ==
With 39.47 million viewers, the first episode of Dolly attracted one of the highest ratings for a series premiere in network TV history, but the initial high ratings during the first few episodes steadily declined, and despite many format changes and other attempts to create interest, ratings did not improve. Halfway through the run, Parton, who retained creative control over the show, took command and jettisoned many of the lavish, splashy segments that she felt were not working in favor of a more "down home" feel. By this time, however, many of the initial viewers had already stopped watching.

== Theme songs ==
The opening theme song was Parton's 1978 hit, "Baby I'm Burnin'", later to be replaced with "Hoedown-Showdown". As with her 1976 series, Parton closed each episode with her signature song, "I Will Always Love You."

== Episodes ==
| No. overall | No. in season | Title | Directed by | Written by | Original release date | Prod. code |
|---|---|---|---|---|---|---|
| 1 | 1 | "Episode 1" | Don Mischer and Jeff Margolis | Fannie Flagg, Phil Hahn, Rhea Kohan, Roger Miller, Buddy Sheffield, Tom Tenowich, and Al Rogers | September 27, 1987 | 101 |
Guest star(s): Dudley Moore, Hulk Hogan, Paul Reubens as Pee-wee Herman, Oprah Winfrey, and Ed Koch Dolly speaks to the audience from her bathtub. The theme song "Baby I'm Burnin'" plays over the opening credits. Dolly performs "Bubbling Over", followed by the "Dolly's Date" segment with Dudley Moore. In retaliation at the tabloids that claimed she would wed a 300-pound wrestler, Dolly wrote a song titled "Headlock on My Heart" about marrying a wrestler and got Hulk Hogan to appear in the video. Dolly and Acapella sing "Do I Ever Cross Your Mind". Dolly pays a visit to Pee Wee's Playhouse and the duo sing "Hey, Good Lookin'". The "Solo in the Spotlight" segment features Dolly singing "Someone to Watch Over Me" from the play Crazy for You. Dolly chats with Oprah Winfrey which leads to a skit with Dolly playing a ditzy actress auditioning for the play Porgy and Bess. Dolly sneaks up on NYC Mayor Ed Koch during the "Out and About" segment. Dolly sings "Coat of Many Colors" during the "My Tennessee Mountain Home" segment. Dolly and Acapella sing "Look on the Bright Side", and then Dolly hosts a Q&A session with the audience. Dolly and Oprah sing "This Little Light of Mine" with a choir. Dolly closes the show by singing "I Will Always Love You", followed by the closing credits.
| 2 | 2 | "Episode 2" | Jeff Margolis | Fannie Flagg, Phil Hahn, Rhea Kohan, Roger Miller, and Buddy Sheffield | October 4, 1987 | 102 |
Guest star(s): Burt Reynolds, Alabama, and Whoopi Goldberg Dolly gives an opening introduction from her bathtub. The theme song "Baby I'm Burnin'" plays over the opening credits. Dolly's opens the show with "Savin' It for You" from her new album Rainbow. Burt Reynolds is Dolly's guest for the "Dolly's Date" segment. Dolly and Acapella sing "Holdin' on to You". During the "Out and About" segment Dolly gets to spend the day at a fire station and ride on a firetruck. Alabama perform their song "Chosen Few". During the "Solo in the Spotlight" segment Dolly sings "Don't Get Around Much Anymore". The "Vanity Fair" segment follows where Dolly tries to talk fourteen and a half year old valley girl Whoopi Goldberg out of getting into a van with a guy, but she only succeeds in talking her out of a haircut. Dolly begins the "My Tennessee Mountain Home" segment by singing the title song. She is then joined by Alabama and they sing "I Saw the Light" and "Mountain Music" together, followed by Dolly singing "Tiptoe, Tiptoe Little Dolly Parton". Dolly and Acapella sing "Look on the Bright Side", and then Dolly hosts a Q&A session with the audience. Dolly sings the Biblical song "My Name Is Jonah" with a group of children. The show closes with Dolly singing "I Will Always Love You", followed by the closing credits.
| 3 | 3 | "Episode 3" | Jeff Margolis | Fannie Flagg, Phil Hahn, Rhea Kohan, Roger Miller, Buddy Sheffield | October 11, 1987 | 103 |
Guest star(s): Bruce Willis, Emmylou Harris, Linda Ronstadt, and Daniel Rosen Dolly gives an introduction from her bathtub. The theme song "Baby I'm Burnin'" plays over the opening credits. The show opens with Dolly singing "The Fire That Keeps You Warm". Bruce Willis is Dolly's guest for the "Dolly's Date" segment and they sing a bit of "Under the Boardwalk". Dolly begins the "My Tennessee Mountain Home" segment by singing the title song, she then introduces Emmylou Harris and Linda Ronstadt. The Trio sing "My Dear Companion", "Hobo's Meditation", and "Those Memories of You". A new segment titled "Dixie's Place" features Dolly working in a diner where she sings "Hollywood Potters". Acapella sing "Jukebox Saturday Night". The "Out and About" segment follows Dolly to Yankee Stadium to visit with the New York Yankees. A new segment titled "The Novelty Club" follows featuring Daniel Rosen. Dolly hosts a Q&A session with the audience. Dolly closes the show by singing "I Will Always Love You", followed by the closing credits.
| 4 | 4 | "Episode 4" | Jeff Margolis | Fannie Flagg, Phil Hahn, Rhea Kohan, Roger Miller, Buddy Sheffield | November 1, 1987 | 104 |
Guest star(s): Patti LaBelle, Patrick Duffy, Christine Ebersole, and the Flying Karamazov Brothers Dolly speaks to the audience from her bathtub. The theme song "Baby I'm Burnin'" plays over the opening credits. Dolly opens the show by singing "A Better Place to Live". Patrick Duffy is Dolly's guest for the "Dolly's Date" segment. Dolly and Acapella sing "Shattered Image". Patti LaBelle sings "I've Been Loving You Too Long". After the song Patti and Dolly have a conversation. The "Dixie's Place" segment follows, featuring Christine Ebersole and she and Dolly sing "Sittin' on the Front Porch Swing". Dolly begins the "My Tennessee Mountain Home" segment by singing the title song, before singing "Traveling Man". Dolly introduces the Flying Karamazov Brothers and then sings a short version of "Great Balls of Fire" towards the end of their act. Dolly and Acapella sing "Look on the Bright Side" and then Dolly has a Q&A session with the audience. Patti LaBelle returns to sing "Up Above My Head" with Dolly. The show closes with Dolly singing "I Will Always Love You", followed by the closing credits.
| 5 | 5 | "Episode 5" | Don Mischer and Jeff Margolis | Fannie Flagg, Phil Hahn, Rhea Kohan, Roger Miller, and Buddy Sheffield | November 8, 1987 | 105 |
Guest star(s): Jim Henson as Kermit the Frog, Delta Burke, Terence Trent D'Arby, and the Oak Ridge Boys Dolly speaks to the audience from her bathtub. The theme song "Baby I'm Burnin'" plays over the opening credits. The show opens with Dolly singing "How Does It Feel". Kermit the Frog is Dolly's guest for the "Dolly's Date" segment and they sing "Everyday People". The Oak Ridge Boys perform "This Crazy Love". Delta Burke guest stars with Dolly in the "Vanity Fair" segment. Terence Trent D'Arby performs "If You Let Me Stay". During the "Dixie's Place" segment Dolly performs "A Cowboy's Ways". Dolly begins the "My Tennessee Mountain Home" segment by singing the title song, before singing "Elvira" and "Swing Low, Sweet Chariot" / "Have a Little Talk with Jesus" with the Oak Ridge Boys. Dolly and Acapella sing "Look on the Bright Side" and then Dolly has a Q&A session with the audience. Dolly performs "Oh, No!" with a group of children. The show closes with Dolly singing "I Will Always Love You", followed by the closing credits.
| 6 | 6 | "Episode 6" | Don Mischer and Jeff Margolis | Fannie Flagg, Phil Hahn, Rhea Kohan, Roger Miller, Buddy Sheffield, Al Rogers, and Tom Tenowich | November 15, 1987 | 106 |
Guest star(s): Ned Beatty, Jackée Harry, Jon Lovitz, and Tom Petty and the Heartbreakers The show opens with Dolly performing "Don't Stop Dreaming". Jackée Harry joins Dolly for the "Vanity Fair" segment and they perform "Here You Come Again". Tom Petty and the Heartbreakers perform "Think About Me". Dolly performs "Night Life" for the "Solo in the Spotlight" segment. Ned Beatty guest stars in the "Dixie's Place" segment and Dolly performs "I'm a Drifter". Jon Lovitz is Dolly's guest for the "Dolly's Date" segment. Dolly begins the "My Tennessee Mountain Home" segment by singing the title song, she then sings "Appalachian Memories". Mat Plendl performs for the second installment of "The Novelty Club". Dolly and Acapella sing "Look on the Bright Side" and then Dolly has a Q&A session with the audience. Dolly performs "The Seeker". The show closes with Dolly singing "I Will Always Love You", followed by the closing credits.
| 7 | 7 | "A Tennessee Mountain Thanksgiving" | Don Mischer | Dolly Parton and Buz Kohan | November 22, 1987 | 107 |
Dolly speaks to the audience from her bathtub. The episode opens with Dolly performing "My Tennessee Mountain Home" on the front porch of the Tennessee Mountain Home where she grew up, interspersed with footage of the Smoky Mountains. Dolly attends Dolly Day in downtown Sevierville, Tennessee. The Gatlinburg-Pittman-Seymour High School and Sevierville High School bands perform "9 to 5" at the ceremony. Dolly talks to a few of her classmates before performing "Mountain Magic". Dolly gives a small tour of Dollywood, highlighting the rides, crafts, and entertainment. She then performs "Rocky Top", followed by "In the Pines" with her brothers, Randy and Floyd. Dolly walks through the fields surrounding the Tennessee Mountain Home and talks about growing up there. She then joins her parents, Lee and Avie Lee Parton, on the front porch and they reminisce about their memories of living there. Dolly performs "In the Good Old Days (When Times Were Bad)". Dolly gives a tour of Craftsman's Valley at Dollywood and performs "Poor Folks Town". Dolly's introduces her uncle, John Henry Owens III. Her aunt Dorothy Jo Owens performs "Daddy Was an Old Time Preacher Man" with Dolly providing backing vocals and various other family members also performing. Dolly performs "On Top of Old Smoky" with her sisters, Stella and Frieda, in front of the Dr. Robert F. Thomas Chapel. Inside the chapel, Dolly and her extended family perform "In the Sweet By-and-By". Dolly's grandfather, Jake Owens, leads the group in a verse of "Amazing Grace" and "At the Cross". Dolly then performs "The Better Part of Life" with her siblings. Dolly closes the episode by performing "I Will Always Love You".
| 8 | 8 | "Episode 8" | Louis J. Horvitz | Fannie Flagg, Phil Hahn, Rhea Kohan, Roger Miller, Tom Perew, Buddy Sheffield, and Bruce Vilanch | December 6, 1987 | 108 |
Guest star(s): Juice Newton, Jerry Reed, and Frank Oz as Miss Piggy. Miss Piggy speaks to the audience from Dolly's bathtub. The theme song "Baby I'm Burnin'" plays over the opening credits. The show opens with Dolly performing "Could I Have Your Autograph?". Dolly attends a Hollywood party. Miss Piggy takes over Dolly's dressing room and plots ways to get Dolly off the show before Dolly arrives and they perform "Friendship". Juice Newton performs "Tell Me True" and then Dolly joins her for "Ride 'Em Cowboy". Jerry Reed guest stars in the "Dixie's Place" segment and Dolly performs "Down". Miss Piggy performs "Someone to Watch Over Me" for the "Solo in the Spotlight" segment, before being interrupted by a producer. Dolly performs "Hoedown Showdown" and then hosts a short Q&A session with the audience. Jerry Reed and Dolly perform "She Got the Goldmine (I Got the Shaft)" and then Juice Newton joins them for "Oh, Lonesome Me". The show closes with Dolly singing "I Will Always Love You".
| 9 | 9 | "Episode 9" | Louis J. Horvitz | John Aylesworth, Phil Hahn, Rhea Kohan, Tom Perew, Buddy Sheffield, and Bruce Vilanch | December 13, 1987 | 109 |
Guest star(s): The Smothers Brothers, Allyce Beasley, Louis Nye, and Willie Nelson The show opens with Dolly performing "Hoedown Showdown", followed by "Two Doors Down". Dolly then hosts a short Q&A session with the audience. Dolly and Acapalla perform "This Ole House". The Smothers Brothers perform a short acapella song for Dolly. Dolly gives Allyce Beasley a tour of the set while the Smothers Brothers do a comedy sketch. Willie Nelson performs "Stardust" and is then joined by Dolly and they perform a medley of "Crazy", "Funny How Time Slips Away", "On the Road Again", "Blue Eyes Crying in the Rain", and "Family Bible". Dolly and Allyce Beasley go on a double date with the Smothers Brothers for the final "Dolly's Date" segment. Willie Nelson performs "Still Is Still Moving" before being joined on stage by Dolly, Allyce Beasley, and the Smothers Brothers for "To All the Girls I've Loved Before". The show closes with Dolly performing "I Will Always Love You".
| 10 | 10 | "A Down Home Country Christmas" | Don Mischer | John Aylesworth, Fannie Flagg, Phil Hahn, Rhea Kohan, Roger Miller, Tom Perew, Buddy Sheffield, and Bruce Vilanch | December 20, 1987 | 110 |
Guest star(s): Mac Davis, Burl Ives, Joanna Barnes, Robert Mandan, and The Peppercorn Players Dolly, dressed in Santa suit, introduces the show from the rooftop of the ABC Studio soundstage and then goes down the chimney. She appears inside and performs "With Bells On" before her guests join in with her. Dolly reminisces about Christmases in the country and sings "A Down Home Country Christmas" with Burl Ives, Mac Davis, and The Peppercorn Players. The Peppercorn Players perform "Grandma Got Run Over by a Reindeer", "All I Want for Christmas Is My Two Front Teeth" and "Jingle Bells" then Dolly leads them in singing "Santa Claus Is Going on a Diet". Dolly and Mac Davis reminisce about Christmas when they were young and Dolly performs "I Remember", which leads into a flashback segment of young Dolly (Maia Brewton) at Christmas. Dolly shows the children a corn cob doll like one she had a child and sings "Little Tiny Tasseltop". Dolly recites "The Letter" which leads into a flashback segment of her first Christmas after moving to Nashville. Mac Davis joins her and sings "Fall in Love with Your Wife" and "Drinkin' Christmas Dinner All Alone" before they sing "White Christmas" together. Joanna Barnes, Robert Mandan, and Burl Ives guest star in the "Dixie's Place" segment. Dolly is joined by Mac Davis and Burl Ives for a medley of "We Need a Little Christmas", "Jingle Bells", "O Little Town of Bethlehem", "Caroling, Caroling", "Silent Night", "O Come, All Ye Faithful" and "Joy to the World". Dolly closes the show performing "Once Upon a Christmas".
| 11 | 11 | "Episode 11" | Louis J. Horvitz | John Aylesworth, Phil Hahn, Rhea Kohan, Tom Perew, Buddy Sheffield, and Bruce Vilanch | January 3, 1988 | 111 |
Guest star(s): Joe Piscopo, Ricky Skaggs, and Tammy Wynette The show opens with Dolly performing "Hoedown Showdown", followed by "9 to 5". Dolly then hosts a short Q&A session with the audience. Dolly and Joe Piscopo as Frank Sinatra perform a medley of "Hello, Dolly!", "My Tennessee Mountain Home", and "I Get a Kick Out of You". Tammy Wynette performs "Talkin' to Myself Again" before Dolly joins her for a medley of "Stand by Your Man", "Apartment No. 9", "D-I-V-O-R-C-E", "I Don't Wanna Play House", and "Your Good Girl's Gonna Go Bad". Dolly performs "Heartbreak Express" during the "Dixie's Place" segment. Dolly and Joe Piscopo chat and then perform "I'm on Fire" with Piscopo as Bruce Springsteen. Ricky Skaggs performs "I'm Tired" and then duets with Dolly on "Oh, the Pain of Loving You". Tammy Wynette joins them on "Hallelujah, I'm Ready to Go". The show closes with Dolly performing "I Will Always Love You".
| 12 | 12 | "Episode 12" | Louis J. Horvitz | John Aylesworth, Brett Butler, Phil Hahn, Rhea Kohan, Tom Perew, Buddy Sheffield, Bruce Vilanch | January 10, 1988 | 112 |
Guest star(s): Mary Hart, Holly Dunn, Brett Butler, and Merle Haggard The show opens with Dolly performing "Hoedown Showdown", followed by "Jolene". Dolly then hosts a short Q&A session with the audience. Mary Hart joins Dolly for s comedy skit. Merle Haggard performs "Twinkle, Twinkle Lucky Star" before Dolly joins him to perform a medley of "Workin' Man Blues", "Swinging Doors", "Today I Started Loving You Again", "Mama Tried", and "Okie from Muskogee". Mary Hart returns to sing "Footloose" before Brett Butler performs a comedy routine. Holly Dunn sings "Strangers Again" and then Dolly joins her for "Daddy's Hands". All of the guests return to the stage to join Dolly on "Rollin' in My Sweet Baby's Arms". Dolly closes the show by performing "I Will Always Love You".
| 13 | 13 | "Episode 13" | Louis J. Horvitz | John Aylesworth, Brett Butler, Phil Hahn, Rhea Kohan, Tom Perew, Buddy Sheffield, and Bruce Vilanch | January 16, 1988 | 113 |
Guest star(s): Kenny Rogers, James Gregory, and Charles Durning The show opens with Dolly performing "Hoedown Showdown", followed by "Islands in the Stream" with Kenny Rogers. Dolly and Kenny then hosts a short Q&A session with the audience. Kenny presents Dolly with a birthday cake and leads the audience in singing "Happy Birthday to You". James Gregory performs a comedy routine. Dolly and Kenny perform a medley of "We've Got Tonight", "Anyone Who Isn't Me Tonight", "Don't Fall in Love with a Dreamer", and "Real Love". Charles Durning guest stars in the "Dixie's Place" segment and Dolly performs "The Stranger". Charles Durning performs "The Sidestep" from The Best Little Whorehouse in Texas. Dolly, Kenny Rogers, and Charles During perform "Blaze of Glory". The show closes with Dolly performing "I Will Always Love You".
| 14 | 14 | "Episode 14" | Louis J. Horvitz | John Aylesworth, Brett Butler, Phil Hahn, Rhea Kohan, Tom Perew, Buddy Sheffield, and Bruce Vilanch | January 23, 1988 | 114 |
Guest star(s): Tom Jones, Lee Majors, Paul Rodriguez, and The McCarters The show opens with Dolly performing "Hoedown Showdown", followed by "Here You Come Again". Dolly then hosts a short Q&A session with the audience. Tom Jones performs a medley of "She's a Lady", "Delilah", "What's New Pussycat?", "Without Love", and "It's Not Unusual". Dolly joins him for "Green, Green Grass of Home". Paul Rodriguez performs a comedy routine. Dolly reruns the "Headlock on My Heart" music video with Hulk Hogan that originally aired during Episode 1. The McCarters perform "Timeless and True Love" and then clog dance to "Foggy Mountain Breakdown". Lee Majors guest stars in the "Dixie's Place" segment and Dolly performs "Kentucky Gambler". Acapella performs "Stand by Me". Dolly, Tom Jones, and The McCarters join Acapella to perform "My Soul Is a Witness". Dolly closes the show by performing "I Will Always Love You".
| 15 | 15 | "Episode 15" | Louis J. Horvitz | John Aylesworth, Brett Butler, Phil Hahn, Rhea Kohan, Tom Perew, Buddy Sheffield, and Bruce Vilanch | January 30, 1988 | 115 |
Guest star(s): Glen Campbell, Brenda Lee, Lee Horsley, Exile, and Ann Madison The show opens with Dolly performing "Hoedown Showdown", followed by "Baby I'm Burnin'". Dolly tells a joke and then has a short Q&A session with the audience. Glen Campbell performs "I Remember You". Dolly and Acapella sing "Amazing Grace" while Glen Campbell plays the bagpipes. The California Raisins perform "I Heard It Through the Grapevine". Ann Madison performs a musical comedy routine. Exile perform "Feel Like Foolin' Around". Lee Horsley guest stars in the "Dixie's Place" segment and performs "Let It Be Me" with Dolly. Brenda Lee performs "I Can't Help It (If I'm Still in Love with You)". Dolly and Glen Campbell join Brenda Lee for a medley of "Southern Nights", "Break It to Me Gently", "The Hand That Rocks the Cradle", "Sweet Nothin's", "Rhinestone Cowboy", "Wichita Lineman", "Galveston", "I'm Sorry", "By the Time I Get to Phoenix", "Dum Dum", and "Jambalaya (On the Bayou)". Dolly closes the show by performing "I Will Always Love You".
| 16 | 16 | "My Hawaii" | Don Mischer | Phil Hahn, Jack Burns, Ann Elder | February 6, 1988 | 116 |
Guest star(s): Palani Vaughan, Melveen Leed, Danny Couch, Norm Compton, Reverend David K. Kaupu, The Brothers Cazimero, Danny Kaleikini, Al Harrington The show opens with Dolly in front of a waterfall singing, "Oh, My Hawaii." Dolly tells the legend of how the Hawaiian islands were formed, and then the locals are shown hula dancing, fishing, pounding poi, creating art and clothing from nature. On a beach, Palani Vaughan discusses the original Hawaiian monarchy and sings "Ipo Lei Manu (Sweetheart of the Bird Feathers)", which segues into a duet of Unchained Melody with Dolly. While showing the local cattle ranchers, Dolly sings "I Want to Be a Cowboy's Sweetheart." She's then joined by Melveen Leed for a duet of "Paniolo Country." Dolly briefly outlines the legend of Madame Pele, a goddess alleged to live in the volcano Kīlauea, and then appears in a music video-like sequence for the original song "Madame Pele, Goddess of Fire." At the Dockside Plantation restaurant that she briefly owned, Dolly sings a new rendition of Hoedown Showdown and hosts a Q&A, then Danny Couch performs At Home in the Islands, and Dolly brings out her former bodyguard, Norm Compton, to duet on "Honolulu Night Life." After discussing how the Lūʻau is prepared, Dolly sings "Come Back to Fair Hawaii." She introduces The Brothers Cazimero, who perform "Hawaii Calls" and "Makalapua." Dolly duets with Danny Kaleikini on "The Hawaiian Wedding Song", with Al Harrington on "Blue Hawaii", and then everyone performs "My Little Grass Shack in Kealakekua, Hawaii" with a group of children. The show closes at the Waimea Falls Park with Dolly and the Honolulu Boys Choir singing "How Great Thou Art".
| 17 | 17 | "Episode 17" | Louis J. Horvitz | Brett Butler, Rhea Kohan, Tom Perew, and Buddy Sheffield | March 5, 1988 | 117 |
Guest star(s): Barbara Mandrell, Smokey Robinson, The Temptations, and Tom Selleck The show opens with Dolly performing "Hoedown Showdown", followed by "All I Can Do". Dolly tells a joke and then has a short Q&A session with the audience before she is joined by Tom Selleck. Barbara Mandrell performs "Angels Love Bad Men". Smokey Robinson performs "Love Don't Give No Reason" before Dolly joins him to premiere the music video for their duet "I Know You by Heart". Barbara Mandrell guest stars in the "Dixie's Place" segment and performs "Just the Way You Are" with Dolly. The Temptations perform "I Wonder Who She's Seeing Now" and then Dolly, Smokey Robinson, and Barbara Mandrell join them for a medley of "My Girl", "Baby, Baby I Need You", "Get Ready", "I Second That Emotion", "Two Lovers", "Shop Around", "Papa Was a Rollin' Stone", "The Tears of a Clown", and "I'm Gonna Make You Love Me". Dolly closes the show by performing "I Will Always Love You".
| 18 | 18 | "Episode 18" | Louis J. Horvitz | Brett Butler, Rhea Kohan, Tom Perew, and Buddy Sheffield | March 12, 1988 | 118 |
Guest star(s): Tyne Daly, Randy Travis, Rich Little, and Nell Carter The show opens with Dolly performing "Hoedown Showdown", followed by "(Your Love Has Lifted Me) Higher and Higher". Dolly tells a joke and then has a short Q&A session with the audience. Rich Little performs a comedy routine. Randy Travis performs "I Told You So" before Dolly joins him on "Blue Blue Day". Tyne Daly guest stars in the "Dixie's Place" segment and performs "If I Could Be There (Too Hard To Be Soft)" with Dolly. Dolly and Rich Little star in an old-time movie skit. Dolly sings "Wildflowers" during the "My Tennessee Mountain Home" segment. Nell Carter performs "Back in the High Life Again" before Dolly joins her for a medley of "Operator (Give Me Jesus on the Line)" and "I'll Fly Away". The show closes with Dolly singing "I Will Always Love You".
| 19 | 19 | "Nashville Memories" | Don Mischer | Buddy Sheffield, Brett Butler, Rhea Kohan, Tom Perew | March 19, 1988 | 119 |
Guest star(s): Porter Wagoner, Fred Foster, Buck Trent, Faron Young, Ralph Emery, Bill Owens, Curly Putman, Bill Phillips, Jimmy C. Newman, Bill Carlisle, Johnny Russell, Chet Atkins, Minnie Pearl, Jan Howard, Skeeter Davis, Jeanne Pruett, Jean Shepard, Del Wood, Norma Jean, Kitty Wells, Stella Parton, Roy Acuff, and Bill Monroe This episode was filmed on location in Nashville at the Grand Ole Opry House, Ryman Auditorium, Tootsie's Orchid Lounge, and RCA Studio B. It begins with Dolly singing "Down on Music Row" at the Grand Ole Opry House. Ben Smathers and his Stoney Mountain Cloggers and Melvin Sloan and his Dancers perform. Dolly is joined by Porter Wagoner at Ryman Auditorium and they perform the "Black Draught Theme". They watch some old video clips from The Porter Wagoner Show before performing a medley of "The Last Thing on My Mind", "Fight and Scratch", "Holding on to Nothin", "Daddy Was an Old Time Preacher Man". Dolly reminisces as Tootsie's Orchid Lounge with Fred Foster, Buck Trent, Faron Young, Ralph Emery, Bill Owens, Curly Putman, Bill Phillips, Jimmy C. Newman, Porter Wagoner, Bill Carlisle, and Johnny Russell. Dolly and Bill Phillips perform "Put It Off Until Tomorrow". Chet Atkins joins Dolly at RCA Studio B to reminisce and perform "Black Smoke's a-Risin'" and "Foggy Mountain Top". Dolly is inducted into the StarWalk in Nashville. Back at the Ryman Auditoriurm, Dolly is joined by Minnie Pearl, Jan Howard, Skeeter Davis, Jeanne Pruett, Jean Shepard, Del Wood, Norma Jean, and Kitty Wells. They all join Kitty Wells in singing "It Wasn't God Who Made Honky Tonk Angels". Back at the Grand Ole Opry House, Dolly introduces her sister Stella Parton who performs "The Reason I'm Living". Roy Acuff performs "Wabash Cannonball", Jimmie C. Newman sings "Cajun Way", Jean Shepard sings "Second Fiddle to an Old Guitar", Bill Monroe performs "Mule Skinner Blues (Blue Yodel No. 8)", Jeanne Pruett performs "Satin Sheets", Del Wood performs a piano solo, Skeeter Davis sings "The End of the World", and Porter Wagoner performs "Ole Slew Foot" and is joined by Dolly and all the previous performers. Dolly invites all present members of the Opry to come on stage and join her in performing "I Saw the Light". The show closes with Dolly singing "I Will Always Love You".
| 20 | 20 | "Episode 20" | Louis J. Horvitz | Brett Butler, Rhea Kohan, Tom Perew, and Buddy Sheffield | April 9, 1988 | 120 |
Guest star(s): Bob Hope, Frank Oz as Miss Piggy, Loretta Swit, and Jerry Lee Lewis The show opens with Dolly performing "Hoedown Showdown", followed by "Star of the Show" and introduces her band. Dolly tells a joke and asks the audience if they have any jokes to share or questions for her then Miss Piggy shows up. Bob Hope and Dolly perform a comedy skit and sing "Buttons and Bows". Dolly and Miss Piggy have a conversation before The Desert Rose Band perform "He's Back and I'm Blue". Jerry Lee Lewis performs "Meat Man" and "Great Balls of Fire" before Dolly joins him and they sing "Why You Been Gone So Long". Dolly joins Miss Piggy on her tour bus. Loretta Swit guest stars in the "Dixie's Place" segment and performs "Stop! In the Name of Love" and "If We Never Meet Again". Dolly and Miss Piggy perform "I'm a Hog for You Baby". The show closes with Dolly singing "I Will Always Love You".
| 21 | 21 | "Down in New Orleans" | Don Mischer | Buddy Sheffield, Brett Butler, Rhea Kohan, Tom Perew | April 30, 1988 | 121 |
Guest star(s): Doug Kershaw, George Kirby as Louis Armstrong, Pete Fountain, Irma Thomas, Allen Toussaint, the Dixie Cups, the Neville Brothers, Dr. John, Good Rockin' Dopsie and the Twisters, and Paul Prudhomme This episode was filmed on location in New Orleans, Louisiana. It begins with Dolly parading down the streets of the French Quarter in a "jazz funeral". She then boards a steamboat and sings "Down by the Riverside" accompanied by Pete Fountain. Dolly discusses the steam calliope with Vic, and the Mississippi River with Captain Doc Holley. Dolly performs "New Orleans" on the deck of the steamboat, again accompanied by Pete Fountain. Dolly takes a tour of New Orleans in a mule-drawn carriage. The Dixie Cups perform "Iko Iko" in the streets of New Orleans and are joined by the Neville Brothers who then perform "When You Go to New Orleans". Dolly tells about riding on a float during the Mardi Gras parade and footage is show of the parade and her performance at the Super Dome ("When the Saints Go Marching In"). George Kirby performs "What a Wonderful World" as Louis Armstrong at Storyville in the French Quarter, followed by Dolly performing "The House of the Rising Sun". Dr. John then performs "Right Place, Wrong Time". Next, Allen Toussaint performs "Southern Nights", followed by Irma Thomas performing "Breakaway". Dolly joins Dr. John, Allen and Irma on stage and they perform "Working in the Coal Mine". Dolly and Doug Kershaw discuss Cajun food with chef Paul Prudhomme. Dolly sings "Rock-a-Bye Baby" before attending a party where Good Rockin' Dopsie and the Twisters are performing "Fais Do-Do." Doug Kershaw then performs "Jambalaya (On the Bayou)" and "Louisiana Man". He and Dolly then perform "Louisiana Saturday Night". Dolly performs "Shall We Gather at the River?" and "Gather on the Other Side" with a choir on a riverbank. Dolly closes the show by singing "Blue Bayou".
| 22 | 22 | "Episode 22" | Louis J. Horvitz | Brett Butler, Rhea Kohan, Tom Perew, Buddy Sheffield, Tom Tenowich, and Al Rogers | May 7, 1988 | 122 |
Guest star(s): Loretta Lynn, Dabney Coleman, Mike Snider, and Jackie Mason The show opens with Dolly performing "Hoedown Showdown", followed by "When Will I Be Loved". Dolly then tells a joke and asks the audience if they have any jokes to share or questions for her. Loretta Lynn performs "Who Was That Stranger" before Dolly joins her for a medley of "Coal Miner's Daughter", "You Ain't Woman Enough", "Don't Come Home a Drinkin' (With Lovin' on Your Mind)", "Blue Kentucky Girl", "One's on the Way", "The Pill", and a reprise of "Coal Miner's Daughter". Jackie Mason performs a comedy routine. Dolly performs "Applejack" during the "My Tennessee Mountain Home" segment. Dabney Coleman guest stars in the "Dixie's Place" segment and Dolly performs "Waterloo". Mike Snider performs "Satellite "T.V." Blues". Dolly and Loretta Lynn join him for "I Shall Not Be Moved". Dolly closes the show with "I Will Always Love You".

== Home media ==
Time Life released the 19-disc box set Dolly: The Ultimate Collection – Deluxe Edition in September 2020 and it features a selection of 16 episodes of the series, marking the first time any episodes from the series have been released on DVD. 15 of the 16 episodes included are heavily edited due to copyright issues.

| Title | Episodes | Bonus features | Disc(s) | Ref. |
|---|---|---|---|---|
| Dolly: The Ultimate Collection – Deluxe Edition | Volume 1, Disc 1: "Episode 1" (edited); "Episode 3" (edited); "Episode 5" (edited); "Episode 9" (edited); Volume 1, Disc 2: "Episode 13" (edited); "Nashville Memories" (edited); "Episode 20" (edited); Volume 1, Disc 3: "A Down Home Country Christmas"; Volume 3, Disc 1: "Episode 2" (edited); "Episode 4" (edited); "Episode 8" (edited); Volume 3, Disc 2: "Episode 11" (edited); "Episode 12" (edited); "Episode 15" (edited); Volume 3, Disc 3: "Episode 17" (edited); "Episode 22" (edited) | Volume 1, Disc 1: Dolly: In Her Own Words; Dolly: Custom Made; Volume 1, Disc 2: Dolly: Highlights from the ’80s Variety Show; Volume 1, Disc 3: Interview: Mac Davis (2012); Volume 3, Disc 3: Interview: Lily Tomlin (2012) | 6 | |
