= American Music Awards of 1989 =

US television program

16th Annual American Music Awards
- Date: January 30, 1989
- Country: United States
- Hosted by: Anita Baker; Debbie Gibson; Kenny Rogers; Rod Stewart
- First award: 1973

Television/radio coverage
- Network: ABC
- Produced by: Dick Clark Productions

The 16th Annual American Music Awards were held on January 30, 1989.

== Winners and nominees ==
Subcategory	Winner	Nominees
Pop/Rock Category
Favorite Pop/Rock Male Artist	George Michael	Michael Jackson; Steve Winwood
Favorite Pop/Rock Female Artist	Whitney Houston	Tracy Chapman; Debbie Gibson
Favorite Pop/Rock Band/Duo/Group	Gloria Estefan & Miami Sound Machine	Def Leppard; Van Halen
Favorite Pop/Rock Album	Dirty Dancing Soundtrack	Hysteria - Def Leppard; Faith - George Michael
Favorite Pop/Rock Song	"Sweet Child O' Mine" - Guns N' Roses	"Never Gonna Give You Up" - Rick Astley "Roll With It" - Steve Winwood
Favorite Pop/Rock New Artist	Tracy Chapman	Rick Astley; Taylor Dayne
Soul/R&B Category
Favorite Soul/R&B Male Artist	George Michael	Bobby Brown; Michael Jackson
Favorite Soul/R&B Female Artist	Whitney Houston	Natalie Cole; Sade
Favorite Soul/R&B Band/Duo/Group	Gladys Knight & The Pips	New Edition; Salt-N-Pepa
Favorite Soul/R&B Album	Faith - George Michael	All Our Love - Gladys Knight & The Pips; Make It Last Forever - Keith Sweat
Favorite Soul/R&B Song	"Nice 'N' Slow" - Freddie Jackson	"Off on Your Own (Girl)" - Al B. Sure! "Girlfriend" - Pebbles
Favorite Soul/R&B New Artist	Al B. Sure!	Tony! Toni! Tone! Karyn White
Country Category
Favorite Country Male Artist	Randy Travis	George Strait; Hank Williams, Jr.
Favorite Country Female Artist	Reba McEntire	Rosanne Cash; Tanya Tucker
Favorite Country Band/Duo/Group	Alabama	The Judds; The Oak Ridge Boys
Favorite Country Album	Always & Forever - Randy Travis	If You Ain't Lovin', You Ain't Livin' - George Strait; Wild-Eyed Dream - Ricky Van Shelton
Favorite Country Song	"I Told You So" - Randy Travis	"Fallin' Again" - Alabama "Eighteen Wheels and a Dozen Roses" - Kathy Mattea
Favorite Country New Artist	Patty Loveless	Larry Boone; The McCarters
Heavy Metal/Hard Rock Category
Favorite Heavy Metal/Hard Rock Artist	Def Leppard	Guns N' Roses; Van Halen
Favorite Heavy Metal/Hard Rock Album	Hysteria - Def Leppard	"Appetite for Destruction" - Guns N' Roses "OU812" - Van Halen
Rap/Hip-Hop Category
Favorite Rap/Hip-Hop Artist	DJ Jazzy Jeff & the Fresh Prince	Run-D.M.C. Salt-N-Pepa
Favorite Rap/Hip-Hop Album	He's the DJ, I'm the Rapper - DJ Jazzy Jeff & the Fresh Prince	"It Takes A Nation Of Millions To Hold Us Back" - Public Enemy "Tougher Than Leather" - Run-D.M.C.
Merit
Willie Nelson
Special Achievement Award
Michael Jackson
