= This Is My Country (disambiguation) =

"This Is My Country" is an American patriotic song composed in 1940.

This Is My Country may also refer to:

- This Is My Country (The Impressions album), 1968
- This Is My Country (Lee Greenwood album), 1988
- This Is My Country (film), a 1984 Filipino drama film
