= Kamilah Forbes =

American curator, producer and director

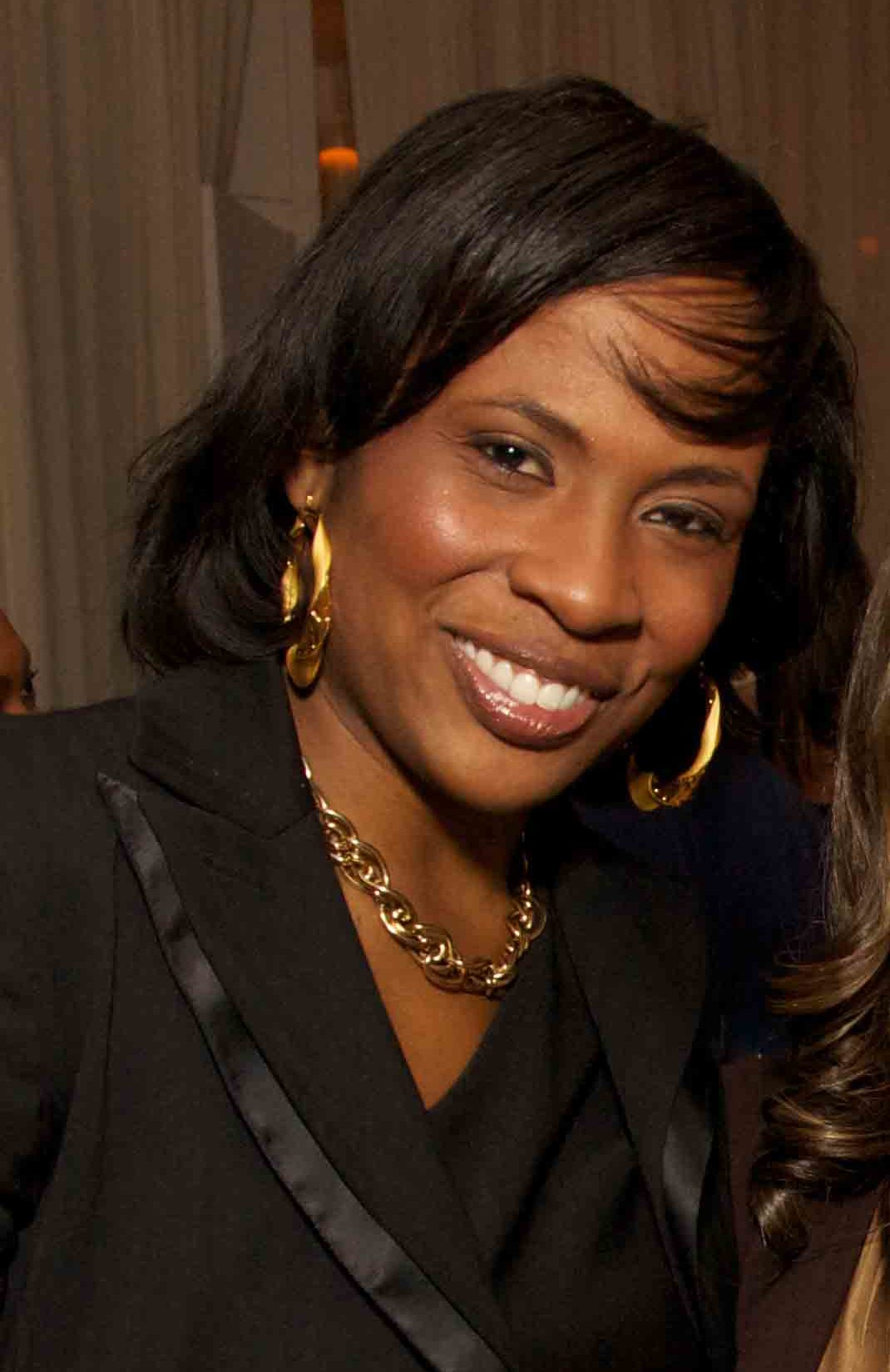
- Forbes at the Hip-Hop Theater Festival Anniversary in 2010

Member of the National Council on the Arts
- Incumbent
- Assumed office February 2022
- Nominated by: Joe Biden
- President: Joe Biden; Donald Trump
- Preceded by: Lee Greenwood

Personal details
- Born: Chicago, Illinois, U.S.
- Education: Howard University
- Occupations: Director; Producer; Curator
- Years active: 2000–present
- Employer: Apollo Theater (2016–present)

Kamilah Forbes is an American curator, producer, and director. She created and directed the Hip Hop Theater Festival from 2000 to 2016. She has held directing roles for television and theater productions such as Holler if Ya Hear Me, The Wiz Live!, and the 2014 revival of Lorraine Hansberry's A Raisin in the Sun. Forbes was named executive producer of the Apollo Theater in 2016.

== Early life and education ==
Forbes was born and raised in Chicago to Jamaican immigrant parents. She attended Howard University with the intention of attending medical school but changed her major to theater to pursue acting. While at Howard she met Chadwick Boseman and they collaborated on a play about their generation.

== Career ==
=== Theater ===
In 2000, Forbes wrote and directed Rhyme Deferred, a play that used a mythic fairy tale format to explore the existential nature of hip-hop. That year, she also created the Hip Hop Theater Festival in 2000 citing the need to feature work created for and by her generation. Forbes oversaw the development of the nonprofit called Hi-ARTS, which produces the festival.

In 2014, Forbes was associate director for the Broadway show Holler if Ya Hear Me and assistant director for the revival of Lorraine Hansberry's A Raisin in the Sun. In 2019 she directed the revival of By The Way, Meet Vera Stark by Lynn Nottage for Signature Theatre.

Forbes left Hi-ARTS in 2016 and became executive producer for Harlem's Apollo Theater that year. She stated that her goal as director would be to preserve the heritage of the Black cultural institution, and has made efforts to add a diversity of Black art to the Apollo Theater's offerings. In 2016, the Theater began hosting the New York premiere of the annual Women of the World Festival.

Forbes was one of 300 signatories of a public letter directed at addressing systemic racism in American theater, along with others such as Sandra Oh, Sterling K. Brown, and Viola Davis. The letter was released in June 2020, in the aftermath of the George Floyd protests.

Forbes is set to direct the Broadway musical Soul Train based on the variety television series, which was originally scheduled to be released in 2021, but due to COVID-19 production delays, is now scheduled for a fall 2022 debut.

=== TV and film ===
Forbes has directed and produced several television productions that center the intersection of Black narratives and music. She produced the HBO television series Def Poetry Jam (2002) and Brave New Voices, PBS's The Women's List, and was associate director for NBC's The Wiz Live!

In 2020, Forbes directed the HBO adaptation of Between the World and Me based on Ta-Nehisi Coates book of the same name. She previously directed the 2018 stage show adaptation. In 2021, it was announced that she will produce a film adaptation of Coates' novel The Water Dancer with Harpo Films and Plan B.

=== Accolades ===
On June 23, 2021, President Joe Biden nominated Forbes to be a member of the National Council of the Arts. The Senate confirmed her on February 17, 2022 via voice vote.

== Personal life ==
Forbes has a daughter (b. 2016).

== Awards and nominations ==
- 2019 – Winner, NBTF Larry Leon Hamlin Producer Award
- 2019 – The Root 100 Honoree
- 2021 – Nominee, Outstanding Directing in a Television Movie or Special, NAACP Image Awards (for Between the World and Me)
- 2026 - Recipient, Drama League Award for Unique Contribution to the Theatre

== Filmography ==
Year	Title	Role	Notes	Ref.
2002	Def Poetry Jam	Co-producer	HBO television series	
2009	Brave New Voices	Co-executive producer	Television series documentary	
2015	The Wiz Live!	Associate director	Live television special	
2015	The Women's List	Executive producer	Episode of PBS' American Masters	
2020	Between the World and Me	Director	HBO television adaptation	
