= Up and Gone =

Single by Jennifer McCarter and The McCarters

from the album Better Be Home Soon
- B-side: "A Letter from Home"
- Released: March 1989
- Genre: Country
- Label: Warner Bros.
- Songwriters: Bill Caswell; Verlon Thompson
- Producers: Paul Worley; Ed Seay

Jennifer McCarter and The McCarters singles chronology
"I Give You Music" (1988)	"Up and Gone" (1989)	"Quit While I'm Behind" (1989)

"Up and Gone" is a song recorded by American country music trio Jennifer McCarter and The McCarters. It was released in March 1989 as the first single from their album Better Be Home Soon. The song peaked at number 9 on the Billboard Hot Country Singles chart. The song was written by Verlon Thompson and Bill Caswell.

== Chart performance ==
Chart (1989)	Peak position
Canada Country Singles (RPM)	5
US Hot Country Songs (Billboard)	9

=== Year-end charts ===
Chart (1989)	Position
Canada Country Tracks (RPM)	64
US Country Songs (Billboard)	98
