= Higher Ground (Tammy Wynette album) =

Studio album by Tammy Wynette
- Released: July 6, 1987
- Recorded: Mar. 1987
- Genre: Country
- Length: 32:23
- Label: Epic Records
- Producer: Steve Buckingham

Tammy Wynette chronology
Sometimes When We Touch (1985)	Higher Ground (1987)	Next to You (1989)

Singles from Higher Ground
- 1. "Your Love" Released: July 1987; 2. "Talkin' to Myself Again" Released: November 1987; 3. "Beneath a Painted Sky" Released: April 1988

Higher Ground is the twenty-seventh studio album by American country music singer-songwriter Tammy Wynette. It was released on July 6, 1987, by Epic Records.

== Recording ==
"A Slow Burning Fire" is a cover of a song recorded by country music artist George Jones on his 1984 album, Ladies' Choice.

== Commercial performance ==
The album peaked at No. 43 on the Billboard Top Country Albums chart. The lead single, "Your Love", reached No. 12 on the Billboard Hot Country Singles chart. The second single, "Talkin' to Myself Again", peaked at No. 16, and the third and final single, "Beneath a Painted Sky", peaked at No. 25.

== Track listing ==
Side one
No.	Title	Writer(s)	Length
1.	"Your Love"	Beckie Foster, Tommy Rocco	3:06
2.	"Tempted"	Al Turney	3:18
3.	"Some Things Will Never Change (duet with Vern Gosdin)"	Max D. Barnes, Troy Seals	2:59
4.	"Beneath a Painted Sky (with Emmylou Harris on backing vocals)"	Joe Chambers, Bucky Jones	2:56
5.	"I Wasn’t Meant to Live My Life Alone (with Vince Gill on backing vocals)"	Paul Overstreet, Don Schlitz	3:25

Side two
No.	Title	Writer(s)	Length
1.	"Higher Ground"	Steve Buckingham	3:17
2.	"Talkin' to Myself Again"	Jamie O'Hara	3:24
3.	"A Slow Burning Fire"	Jan Buckingham, Vicki Smith	3:05
4.	"There’s No Heart So Strong"	Don Schlitz, Paul Overstreet	3:26
5.	"All Through Throwing Good Love After Bad"	Guy Clark, Richard Leigh	3:27

== Personnel ==
Adapted from liner notes.

=== Musicians ===
- Eddie Bayers - drums
- Steve Buckingham - guitar
- Mark Casstevens - guitar
- Rodney Crowell - harmony vocals (track 10)
- Jerry Douglas - dobro
- Paul Franklin - steel guitar, dobro
- Lary Gatlin - harmony vocals (track 6)
- Rudy Gatlin - harmony vocals (track 6)
- Steve Gatlin - harmony vocals (track 6)
- Steve Gibson - guitar
- Vince Gill - harmony vocals (track 5)
- Vern Gosdin - duet vocals (track 3)
- Emmylou Harris - harmony vocals (track 4)
- Roy Huskey - upright bass
- Randy McCormick - piano
- Mark O'Connor - fiddle, mandolin, guitar
- The O’Kanes- harmony vocals (track 7)
- Paul Overstreet - harmony vocals (track 9)
- John Wesley Ryles - harmony vocals (track 8)
- Tom Robb - bass guitar
- Ricky Van Shelton - harmony vocals (track 8)
- Ricky Skaggs - harmony vocals (track 1)
- Jeanne Smith - harmony vocals (track 10)
- Jay Spell - accordion
- Harry Stinson - harmony vocals (track 8)
- Gene Watson - harmony vocals (track 2)
- Dennis Wilson - harmony vocals (track 8)
- Tammy Wynette - lead vocals

=== Technical ===
- Randy Best - assistant engineer
- Steve Buckingham - producer
- Joe Bogan - recording engineer
- Michael Koreiba - assistant engineer
- McGuire - album photography
- Denny Purcell - mastering
- Dennis Richey - assistant engineer
- George Richey - management
- Teri Serletie - production assistant
- Lee Waters - assistant engineer

== Chart positions ==
=== Album ===
Year	Chart	Peak position
1987	Top Country Albums (Billboard)	43

=== Singles ===
Year	Single	Chart	Peak position
1987	"Your Love"	Hot Country Singles (Billboard)	12
1987	"Talkin' to Myself Again"	Hot Country Singles (Billboard)	16
1988	"Beneath a Painted Sky"	Hot Country Singles (Billboard)	25
