= Your Love (Tammy Wynette song) =

- UK release picture sleeve

Single by Tammy Wynette

from the album Higher Ground
- B-side: "I Wasn't Meant to Live My Life Again"
- Released: June 1987
- Recorded: March 1987
- Studio: Nashville, Tennessee, U.S.
- Genre: Country
- Length: 3:06
- Label: Epic
- Songwriters: Beckie Foster; Tommy Rocco
- Producer: Steve Buckingham

Tammy Wynette singles chronology
"Alive and Well" (1986)	"Your Love" (1987)	"Talkin' to Myself Again" (1987)

"Your Love" is a song written by Beckie Foster and Tommy Rocco, recorded by American country music artist Tammy Wynette. It was released in June 1987 as the first single from the album Higher Ground.

== Background and reception ==
"Your Love" was recorded in March 1987 in Nashville, Tennessee. The recording session included additional tracks, that would later appear on Wynette's 1987 album. Although not officially credited on the single release, "Your Love" featured harmony vocals from Ricky Skaggs. The session included several other notable artists performing on background vocals as well. The session was produced by Steve Buckingham.

The song reached number 12 on the Billboard Hot Country Singles chart. "Your Love" became Wynette's first single to become a major hit since 1985's "Sometimes When We Touch". It was released on her 1987 studio album Higher Ground.

== Track listing ==
7" vinyl single

- "Your Love" – 3:06
- "I Wasn't Meant to Live My Life Alone" – 3:25

== Charts ==
Chart (1987)	Peak position
US Hot Country Singles (Billboard)	12
Canada Country Singles (RPM)	13
