= Beneath a Painted Sky =

Single by Tammy Wynette

from the album Higher Ground
- B-side: "Some Things Will Never Change"
- Released: April 1988
- Genre: Country
- Length: 2:56
- Label: Epic
- Songwriters: Joe Chambers; Bucky Jones
- Producer: Steve Buckingham

Tammy Wynette singles chronology
"Talkin' to Myself Again" (1987)	"Beneath a Painted Sky" (1988)	"Next to You" (1988)

"Beneath a Painted Sky" is a song written by Joe Chambers and Bucky Jones that was originally recorded by American country artist Tammy Wynette. It was released as a single in 1988, reaching top 40 chart positions in both the United States and Canada. It was the third single off Wynette's 1987 album, Higher Ground.

== Background, release and chart performance ==
Tammy Wynette was considered among country music's most popular female artists during the 1960s and 1970s. She had 20 number one Billboard country singles. At the beginning of the 1980s, her chart success began to wane. In 1985, she returned to the top ten and then received critical acclaim for her 1987 album, Higher Ground. The album produced two top 20 Billboard singles. One of the singles from Higher Ground was the track "Beneath a Painted Sky". It was composed by Joe Chambers and Bucky Jones. It featured harmony vocals by Emmylou Harris, which were not credited to her on the single's official release.

The song was recorded in Nashville, Tennessee and was produced by Steve Buckingham. It was released as a single by Epic Records in April 1988 backed by the track, "Some Things Never Change". "Beneath a Painted Sky" peaked at number 25 on the American Billboard Hot Country Songs chart in 1988. It was Wynette's third top 40 Billboard country single in a row. In Canada, it reached number 28 on their RPM Country Songs chart. A music video was released for the single that was directed by Jim May.

== Track listing ==
7" vinyl single

- "Beneath a Painted Sky" – 2:56
- "Some Things Will Never Change" – 2:59

== Charts ==
Chart (1981)	Peak position
US Hot Country Singles (Billboard)	25
Canada Country Singles (RPM)	28
