= Dixie Road =

Dixie Road could refer to the following:

- Dixie Road (Peel Region), a major north–south thoroughfare passing through Mississauga, Brampton and Caledon
- "Dixie Road" (song), a 1985 single by Lee Greenwood
- Dixie Fire, named after Dixie Road

== See also ==
- Dixie Highway
- Dixie Overland Highway
