= We've Got It Made =

Single by Lee Greenwood

from the album Holdin' a Good Hand
- Released: October 27, 1990
- Genre: Country
- Length: 3:24
- Label: Capitol
- Songwriters: Sandy Ramos; Bob Regan
- Producer: Jerry Crutchfield

Lee Greenwood singles chronology
"Holdin' a Good Hand" (1990)	"We've Got It Made" (1990)	"Just Like Me" (1991)

"We've Got It Made" is a song written by Sandy Ramos and Bob Regan and recorded by the American country music artist Lee Greenwood. It was released in October 1990 as the second single from his album Holdin' a Good Hand. The song reached number 14 on the Billboard Hot Country Singles & Tracks chart in January 1991.

== Chart performance ==
Chart (1990–1991)	Peak position
Canada Country Singles (RPM)	15
US Hot Country Songs (Billboard)	14
