= Palani Vaughan =

Musician

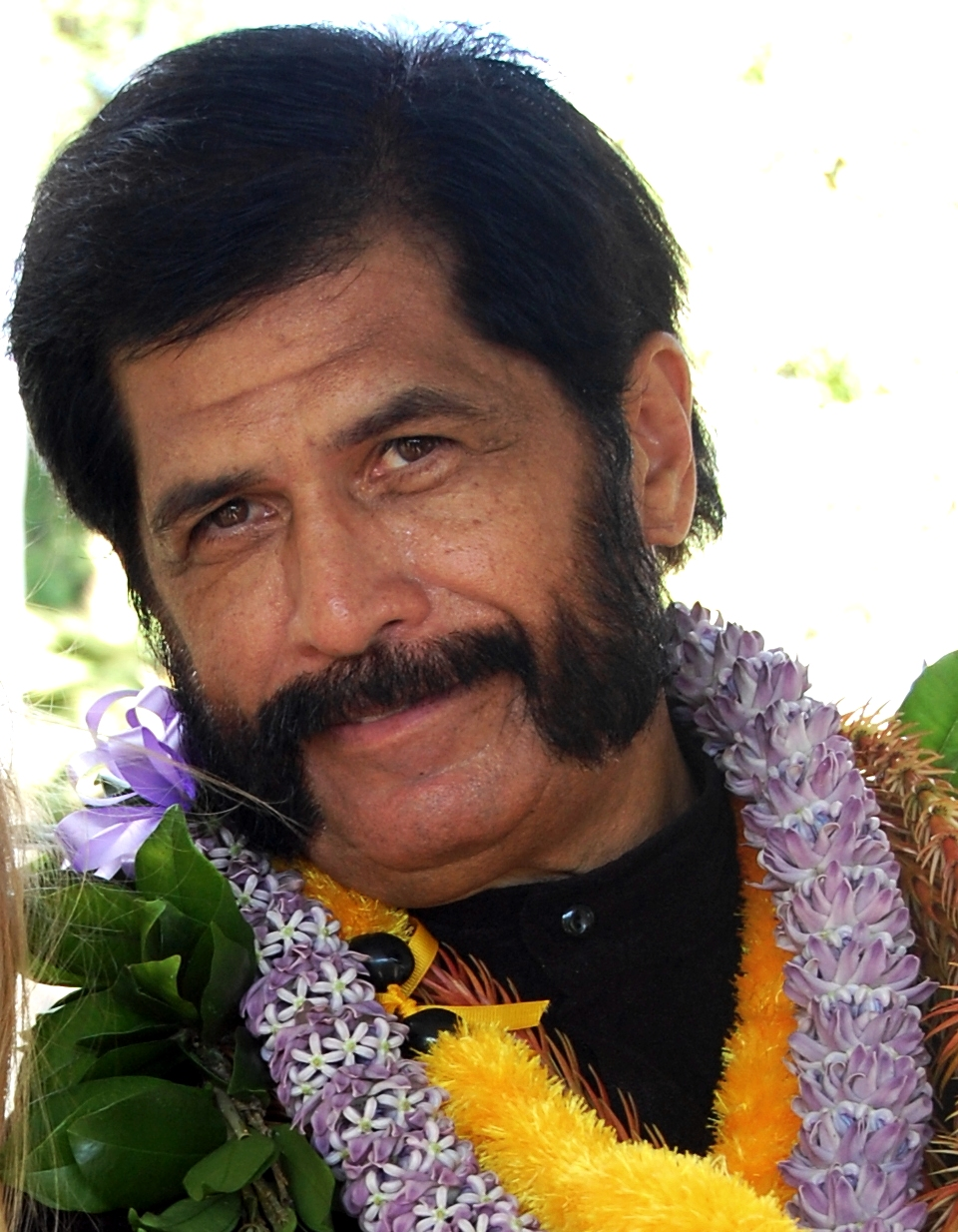
Palani Vaughan in 2008

Palani Vaughan (May 27, 1944 – December 8, 2016) was a Hawaiian musician. During his career, he was a featured artist on Hawaii Calls. KCCN radio included his songs "Ipo Lei Manu", "Ka Mamakakaua", "Eia No Kawika/Kalakaua He Inoa", "He Pua Wehiwa", "Ku‘i Ka Lono", "Ia Oe E Ka La" and "He‘eia" among its list of best songs created by Hawaiian artists. He and Peter Moon were founding members of Sunday Manoa. He was inducted into the Hawaiian Music Hall of Fame in 2008.

Vaughan was recognized as an authority on Hawaiian culture, and formed the King's Own musical group as a tribute to King Kalākaua. He was part of the 1985 committee that created the bronze statue of Kalākaua located at the fork in the road splitting Kalakaua and Kuhio avenues in Waikiki. He died on December 8, 2016, aged 72 due to amyloidosis, a heart condition caused by abnormal amyloid protein buildup in organs.

== Filmography ==
Year	Title	Role	Notes
1975	Hawaii Five-O	2nd Mystery Man	Episode: "Retire in Sunny Hawaii... Forever"
1987	Magnum, P.I.	Singer	Episode: "Forever in Time"
1988	Dolly	Self/Singer	Episode: "My Hawaii"
