= American Music Award for Favorite Country New Artist =

Country music award

American Music Award for Breakthrough Country Artist
- Awarded for: Country music artists
- Country: United States
- Presented by: American Music Awards
- First award: 1989
- Currently held by: Sam Barber
- Website: theamas.com

The American Music Award for Breakthrough Country Artist is an award given to country music artists. It was created in 1989, as Favorite Country New Artist, and was initially discontinued in 2003, before being revived (along with the other genre breakthrough artists categories) in 2026.

Years reflect the year in which the American Music Awards were presented, for works released in the previous year.

== Winners and nominees ==
=== 1980s ===
Year	Artist	Ref
1989 (16th)
1989 (16th)	Patty Loveless	
1989 (16th)	Larry Boone	
1989 (16th)	The McCarters	

=== 1990s ===
Year	Artist	Ref
1990 (17th)
1990 (17th)	Clint Black	
1990 (17th)	Cee Cee Chapman	
1990 (17th)	Skip Ewing	
1991 (18th)
1991 (18th)	The Kentucky Headhunters	
1991 (18th)	Alan Jackson	
1991 (18th)	Travis Tritt	
1992 (19th)
1992 (19th)	Trisha Yearwood	
1992 (19th)	Billy Dean	
1992 (19th)	Pam Tillis	
1993 (20th)
1993 (20th)	Billy Ray Cyrus	
1993 (20th)	Brooks & Dunn	
1993 (20th)	Wynonna Judd	
1994 (21st)
1994 (21st)	John Michael Montgomery	
1994 (21st)	Clay Walker	
1994 (21st)	Tracy Byrd	
1995 (22nd)
1995 (22nd)	Tim McGraw	
1995 (22nd)	Faith Hill	
1995 (22nd)	The Mavericks	
1996 (23rd)
1996 (23rd)	Shania Twain	
1996 (23rd)	Rhett Akins	
1996 (23rd)	Ty Herndon	
1997 (24th)
1997 (24th)	LeAnn Rimes	
1997 (24th)	Mindy McCready	
1997 (24th)	Terri Clark	
1998 (25th)
1998 (25th)	Lee Ann Womack	
1998 (25th)	Bob Carlisle	
1998 (25th)	Kevin Sharp	
1999 (26th)
1999 (26th)	Dixie Chicks	
1999 (26th)	The Kinleys	
1999 (26th)	The Wilkinsons	

=== 2000s ===
Year	Artist	Ref
2000 (27th)
2000 (27th)	Montgomery Gentry	
2000 (27th)	Sara Evans	
2000 (27th)	SHeDAISY	
2001 (28th)
2001 (28th)	Billy Gilman	
2001 (28th)	Alecia Elliott	
2001 (28th)	Keith Urban	
2002 (29th)
2002 (29th)	Trick Pony	
2002 (29th)	Blake Shelton	
2002 (29th)	Jamie O'Neal	
2003 (January) (30th)
2003 (January) (30th)	Carolyn Dawn Johnson	
2003 (January) (30th)	Kellie Coffey	
2003 (January) (30th)	Tommy Shane Steiner	
2003 (November)–2009	—N/a	

=== 2010s ===
Year	Artist	Ref
2010–2019	—N/a	

=== 2020s ===
Year	Artist	Ref
2020–2025	—N/a	
2026 (52th)
2026 (52th)	Sam Barber	
2026 (52th)	Tucker Wetmore	
2026 (52th)	Zach Top	
