= Holdin' a Good Hand =

Single by Lee Greenwood

from the album Holdin' a Good Hand
- B-side: "Another Year of Love"
- Released: June 1990
- Genre: Country
- Length: 2:47
- Label: Capitol
- Songwriters: Rob Crosby, Johnny Few
- Producer: Jerry Crutchfield

Lee Greenwood singles chronology
"I Go Crazy" (1989)	"Holdin' a Good Hand" (1990)	"We've Got It Made" (1991)

"Holdin' a Good Hand" is a song written by Rob Crosby and Johnny Few, and recorded by American country music artist Lee Greenwood. It was released in June 1990 as the first single and title track from the album Holdin' a Good Hand. The song reached number 2 on the Billboard Hot Country Singles & Tracks chart.

== Chart performance ==
Chart (1990)	Peak position
Canada Country Singles (RPM)	2
US Hot Country Songs (Billboard)	2

=== Year-end charts ===
Chart (1990)	Position
Canada Country Tracks (RPM)	18
US Country Songs (Billboard)	32
