= Streamline (Lee Greenwood album) =

Studio album by Lee Greenwood
- Released: August 5, 1985
- Studio: MCA Music Media Studios, Los Angeles, California, Music Mill Recording Studios, and Sound Stage Studios Nashville, TN
- Genre: Country
- Length: 33:49
- Label: MCA
- Producer: Jerry Crutchfield

Lee Greenwood chronology
| Meant for Each Other (1984) | Streamline (1985) | Greatest Hits (1985) |

Professional ratings
Review scores
| Source | Rating |
|---|---|
| AllMusic | 3/5 stars |

Streamline is the fourth studio album by American country music singer Lee Greenwood, released on August 5, 1985 by MCA Records. It was number one on US Country charts.

== Track listing ==
| No. | Title | Writer(s) | Length |
|---|---|---|---|
| 1. | "Streamline" | Lewis Anderson, Brent Mason | 3:20 |
| 2. | "Lonely People" | Mike Reid, Troy Seals, Eddie Setser | 2:56 |
| 3. | "I Don't Mind the Thorns (If You're the Rose)" | Jan Buckingham, Linda Young | 3:22 |
| 4. | "Hearts Aren't Made to Break (They're Made to Love)" | Steve Dean, Roger Murrah | 2:58 |
| 5. | "A Little at a Time" | Mark Nesler | 3:38 |
| 6. | "Breakin' Even" | Bobby Fischer, Rick Giles | 3:36 |
| 7. | "Don't Underestimate My Love For You" | Steve Diamond, Steve Dorff, Dave Loggins | 3:03 |
| 8. | "Same Old Song" | Jerry Crutchfield, Lee Greenwood | 3:56 |
| 9. | "The Will to Love" | Diamond, Loggins | 3:40 |
| 10. | "Leave My Heart the Way You Found It" | Charlie Black, Austin Roberts, Tommy Rocco | 3:20 |

== Personnel ==
- Guitar: Pete Bordonali, Steve Gibson, Kenny Mims, Don Potter, Brent Rowan. Steel guitar: Larry Sasser
- Bass: David Hungate, Joe Osborn, Jack Williams
- Keyboards: David Briggs, Dave Innis, John Barlow Jarvis, Hargus "Pig" Robbins, James Stroud
- Drums: Jerry Kroon, Larrie Londin
- Harmonica: Lee Greenwood
- Strings: The Nashville String Machine
- Backing Vocals: Carol Chase, Greg Gordon, Hurshel Wiginton, Dennis Wilson, Curtis Young

== Charts ==
=== Weekly charts ===
| Chart (1986) | Peak position |
|---|---|
| US Top Country Albums (Billboard) | 1 |

=== Year-end charts ===
| Chart (1986) | Position |
|---|---|
| US Top Country Albums (Billboard) | 10 |
