= Love Will Find Its Way to You (album) =

Studio album by Lee Greenwood
- Released: August 11, 1986
- Recorded: 1986
- Studio: Sound Stage Studios, Nashville; Eleven Eleven Studio, Nashville
- Genre: Country
- Length: 37:08
- Label: MCA
- Producer: Jerry Crutchfield

Lee Greenwood chronology
Greatest Hits (1985)	Love Will Find Its Way to You (1986)	If There's Any Justice (1987)

Singles from Love Will Find Its Way to You
- 1. "Didn't We" Released: August 4, 1986; 2. "Mornin' Ride" Released: November 1986

Love Will Find Its Way to You is the fifth studio album by American country music singer Lee Greenwood. The album was released on August 11, 1986, by MCA Records.

== Track listing ==
No.	Title	Writer(s)	Length
1.	"Love Will Find Its Way to You"	Dave Loggins, J. D., Martin	3:55
2.	"Look What We Made (When We Made Love)"	Loggins, Russell Smith, Marshall Chapman	3:20
3.	"Silver Saxophone"	Deborah Allen, Rafe Van Hoy	4:05
4.	"Gonna Leave the Light On"	Don Pfrimmer, Will Robinson	3:56
5.	"Heartbreak Radio"	Troy Seals, Frankie Miller	3:32
6.	"Just Another Somebody's Body"	Loggins	3:38
7.	"Didn't We"	Seals, Graham Lyle	4:00
8.	"Mornin' Ride"	Steve Bogard, Jeff Tweel	3:23
9.	"From Now On"	Lee Greenwood	3:49
10.	"Little Red Caboose"	Loggins, Steve Gibson	3:30

== Personnel ==
- Kenny Mims, Steve Gibson, Brent Mason - guitar
- Bob Wray - bass guitar
- Mitch Humphries - keyboards
- James Stroud - drums
- David Innis - synthesizer
- Lee Greenwood - lead vocals
- Dave Loggins, J.D. Martin, Judy Rodman, Doana Cooper, Donna McElroy, Larry Stewart, Vince Gill, Carol Chase, Dana McVicker, Greg Gordon - backing vocals

== Charts ==
Chart (1986)	Peak position
US Top Country Albums (Billboard)	9
