= Buddy Sheffield =

American writer, producer and composer

Morris Taylor "Buddy" Sheffield is an American comedy writer, producer and composer.

== Career ==
He is best known as Emmy-nominated head writer on Fox TV's breakthrough sketch comedy series, In Living Color, having written such favorites as "Homey Claus", "Homeboy Shopping Network", "This Old Box" and "Men on Books". Sheffield, who is white and was raised in the rural south, won an NAACP Image Award for his work on the show. Prior to that he had spent 10 years writing for dozens of performers ranging from Dolly Parton to the Smothers Brothers.

Sheffield co-created the teen hit Roundhouse on Nickelodeon in the 1990s, often cited as revolutionary for its frenetically paced staging and sophisticated satire involving real teen issues. Roundhouse was shot in real-time before a live audience and was described by one critic as "like seeing all the high points of a smash Broadway show in half an hour." Sheffield created the show with his former wife, Rita Hester, with whom he had founded a children's theatre company when they were students at The University of Southern Mississippi. That venture, Sheffield Ensemble Theatre, lasted 13 years and had become the number one touring children's theatre in the country prior to going bankrupt as a major contractor to the failed New Orleans World's Fair. Sheffield paid off his cast and crew and moved to Los Angeles. His years in live theatre are apparent in "Roundhouse" and all his work. In 2016 Nick began rerunning episodes of Roundhouse.

In 1982, his musical Cleavage, for which he had written book, music and lyrics, opened on Broadway. Though it had been playing successfully in New Orleans, it closed after one performance. One day after it closed it received a favorable review from the New York Times.

Sheffield again targeted Broadway with a musical send-up of Rodgers and Hammerstein's Oklahoma! called IDAHO! for which he also wrote book, music and lyrics (with additional music and arrangements by long-time friend and collaborator Keith Thompson). IDAHO! premiered at the New York Musical Theatre Festival winning several awards including the "Best of Fest" Audience Prize for best-received show. In July 2016 IDAHO! was presented on the main stage at the magnificent Smith Center in Las Vegas.

== Disney lawsuit ==
In 2007, Sheffield sued Disney for breach of implied contract over a musical sitcom called "Rock and Roland" that he pitched to the Disney Channel in late 2001. Sheffield's detailed pitch was about a junior high kid with a widowed parent who is a regular kid by day and secretly a pop superstar by night. The lawsuit claims that Disney executives showed great interest, requested more material, passed on the project and then misappropriated it. Disney went on to produce the show under the name Hannah Montana. An August 26, 2008 court date was set in Los Angeles Superior Court, but prior to that date the case was quietly settled.
