= Deferral (disambiguation) =

Deferral or deferment may refer to:

- Deferral, in accounting
- Deferment – postponement of military conscription, particularly student deferments
- Student loan deferment – postponement of payment of a student loan

University admissions

- Deferred – when a student is rejected from the first round (early decision/early action) of admissions, but will be considered for the main round (regular decision)
- Deferred admission – when a student is accepted in one year (say 1990), but wishes to not enroll in this year, but rather in a future year, often next year (say 1991) – see gap year

Law

- Deferred disposition
- Deferred prosecution

Philosophy

- Différance
