= The Wagoneers =

American neo-traditional country music band

- Origin: Austin, Texas
- Genres: Country, Rockabilly, Honkytonk, Americana, Alternative Country
- Years active: 1986–1991, 2011-present
- Labels: A&M Records
- Members: Monte Warden; Brent Wilson; Brad Fordham; Mas Palermo
- Past members: Craig Allan Pettigrew; Thomas A. Lewis, Jr.; John Ludwick; Eric Danheim; Lisa Pankratz; Colin Boyd; Bracken Hale; T. Jarrod Bonta; Floyd Domino
- Website: http://thewagoneers.com/

The Wagoneers are a neo-traditional country band founded in Austin, Texas in 1986 and now in a resurgence. As innovators who received critical acclaim with a modern interpretation of a historical country sound—part honky-tonk and part rockabilly—The Wagoneers influenced other artists and helped lay the foundation for the emerging Americana and alt-country movement of the 1990s.

The original line-up included bandleader and songwriter Monte Warden (lead vocals, rhythm guitar), Brent Wilson (lead guitar, backing vocals), Craig Allan Pettigrew (bass) and Thomas A. Lewis, Jr. (drums). The band performed, toured, and recorded two albums in 1988 and 1989 before disbanding. It reformed about 22 years later in 2012 and continues to play regularly in Austin and regionally.

== Background ==
The Wagoneers performed at the very first SXSW music festival in 1987. The band was soon signed to A&M Records. Their debut album, Stout and High, was released on A&M in 1988; a follow-up album, Good Fortune, was released in 1989. The band performed internationally during this era, including appearances on Austin City Limits and Nashville Now, and The Grand Ole Opry.

Its debut album, “Stout and High,” proved influential. It received a positive critical reception, earning the band awards; singles from the album enjoyed national radio play. Chet Flippo (Rolling Stone) characterized The Wagoneers as "The greatest honky tonk band that ever was." Margaret Moser (Austin Chronicle) referred to them as "The fathers of alt-country and Americana." Bob Oermann (Music Row Magazine) referred to The Wagoneers as "The band that started the modern Texas Music scene." Mario Tarradell (Dallas Morning News) called them, "A mythic and legendary band." Billboard stated, “If The Clash had been a country band, they would have been The Wagoneers.”

The band toured and attracted crowds while sharing the stage with diverse acts. Including bands with whom Monte Warden played as a solo artist, these include headliners Willie Nelson, Emmylou Harris, George Strait, Roger Miller, Bill Monroe, Rank and File, Joe Ely, Kelly Willis, Bruce Robison, Marty Stuart, The Mavericks, Justin Furstenfeld (Blue October), Dwight Yoakam, The Ramones, Patty Loveless, Radney Foster, Vince Gill, Soul Asylum, John Hiatt, Chuck Berry, ZZ Top, Stevie Ray Vaughan, The Who, Randy Travis, Miranda Lambert, Lyle Lovett, and kd lang.

By 1991 the group had disbanded and the members pursued separate careers. (During Monte Warden's solo career, his backing band, The Lonesharks, included three musicians in the current line-up of The Wagoneers: guitarist Brent Wilson, bassist Brad Fordham, drummer/co-producer Mas Palermo. In 1994 they were named the "Best Roots Rock" band at the Austin Music Awards.)

For its 2011 induction into Austin Music Awards Hall of Fame (a.k.a. The Texas Music Hall of Fame), The Wagoneers reunited for an awards show performance, reformed, and began performing again. They put out a CD that re-issued both of their first albums in a compilation as "The Essential Wagoneers (2011)." The band has recorded a new album with Grammy-winning and multi-platinum producer, Mark Bright, at the helm; it awaits release. The first band ever signed from SXSW, The Wagoneers again have appeared as an official SXSW showcase in recent years.

The Wagoneers play regularly at legendary Texas live music venues with popular dance floors. Venues for their weekly or monthly residencies (standing gigs) have included The Continental Club, The Saxon Pub, C-Boys Heart and Soul, The Mucky Duck, and the historic Austin dance hall, The Broken Spoke.

The Wagoneers were among hundreds of artists whose material was destroyed in the 2008 Universal fire.

== Discography ==
=== Albums ===
Year	Album	US Country	Label
1988	Stout & High	47	A&M
1989	Good Fortune	—	A&M
2011	The Essential Wagoneers	-	-

=== Singles ===
Year	Single	Chart Positions		Album
Year	Single	US Country	CAN Country	Album
1988	"I Wanna Know Her Again"	43	32	Stout & High
1988	"Every Step of the Way"	52	18	Stout & High
1989	"Help Me Get Over You"	66	*	Stout & High
1989	"Sit a Little Closer"	53	48	Good Fortune

=== Music videos ===
Year	Video
1988	"I Wanna Know Her Again"
1989	"Sit A Little Closer"
