= Didn't We (Lee Greenwood song) =

Single by Lee Greenwood

from the album Love Will Find Its Way to You
- B-side: "Heartbreak Radio"
- Released: August 4, 1986
- Genre: Country
- Length: 4:00
- Label: MCA
- Songwriters: Troy Seals, Graham Lyle
- Producer: Jerry Crutchfield

Lee Greenwood singles chronology
"Hearts Aren't Made to Break (They're Made to Love)" (1986)	"Didn't We" (1986)	"Mornin' Ride" (1987)

"Didn't We" is a song written by Troy Seals and Graham Lyle, and recorded by American country music artist Lee Greenwood. It was released in August 1986 as the first single from the album Love Will Find Its Way to You. The song reached number 10 on the Billboard Hot Country Singles & Tracks chart.

== Chart performance ==
"Didn't We" debuted at number 58 on the U.S. Billboard Hot Country Singles & Tracks for the week of August 9, 1986.

Chart (1986)	Peak position
US Hot Country Songs (Billboard)	10
Canadian RPM Country Tracks	10
