= If There's Any Justice (Lee Greenwood song) =

Single by Lee Greenwood

from the album If There's Any Justice
- B-side: "We Could Have Been"
- Released: August 17, 1987
- Genre: Country
- Length: 4:11
- Label: MCA
- Songwriter(s): Tony Colton, Michael Noble, C. Michael Spriggs
- Producer(s): Jimmy Bowen, Lee Greenwood

Lee Greenwood singles chronology
"Someone" (1987)	"If There's Any Justice" (1987)	"Touch and Go Crazy" (1987)

"If There's Any Justice" is a song by written by Michael Noble, C. Michael Spriggs and Tony Colton, and recorded by American country music artist Lee Greenwood. It was released in August 1987 as the second single and title track from the album If There's Any Justice. The song reached number 9 on the Billboard Hot Country Singles & Tracks chart.

== Chart performance ==
Chart (1987)	Peak position
US Hot Country Songs (Billboard)	9
Canadian RPM Country Tracks	24
