= If Only for One Night (Lee Greenwood album) =

Studio album by Lee Greenwood
- Released: May 26, 1989
- Recorded: 1989
- Genre: Country
- Length: 30:56
- Label: MCA
- Producer: James Stroud, Lee Greenwood

Lee Greenwood chronology
Greatest Hits Volume Two (1988)	If Only for One Night (1989)	Holdin' a Good Hand (1990)

Singles from If Only for One Night
- 1. "I Love the Way He Left You" Released: 1989; 2. "I Go Crazy" Released: 1989

If Only for One Night is the eighth studio album by American country music singer Lee Greenwood. The album was released on May 26, 1989, by MCA Records.

== Track listing ==
No.	Title	Length
1.	"If Only for One Night"	4:42
2.	"I Go Crazy"	3:50
3.	"Opinion on Love"	3:32
4.	"I Love the Way He Left You"	3:35
5.	"We Fell in Love Anyway"	3:04
6.	"Any Way the Law Allows"	3:35
7.	"Comin' Apart at the Dreams"	4:19
8.	"My Heart Is on the Line"	4:31
9.	"'Til Then"	3:00
10.	"Home to Alaska"	3:09
Total length:		30:56

== Personnel ==
Adapted from liner notes.

- Alfie Bilas - background vocals
- Steve Dorff - string arrangements
- Gail Farrell - background vocals
- Sonny Garrish - steel guitar
- Steve Gibson - electric guitar, mandolin
- Lee Greenwood - lead vocals
- Eric Horner - acoustic guitar
- Steve Mandile - acoustic guitar, electric guitar, background vocals
- The Nashville String Machine - strings
- Matt McKenzie - bass guitar
- Terry McMillan - harmonica
- Matt Rollings - piano
- Tony Smith - keyboards, background vocals
- James Stroud - percussion
- Chuck Tilley - drums, percussion

== Charts ==
Chart (1989)	Peak position
US Top Country Albums (Billboard)	66
