= Holdin' a Good Hand (album) =

Studio album by Lee Greenwood
- Released: July 10, 1990
- Recorded: 1990
- Genre: Country
- Length: 34:12
- Label: Capitol Records
- Producer: Jerry Crutchfield

Lee Greenwood chronology
If Only for One Night (1989)	Holdin' a Good Hand (1990)	A Perfect 10 (1991)

Singles from Holdin' a Good Hand
- 1. "Holdin' a Good Hand" Released: June 1990; 2. "We've Got It Made" Released: October 27, 1990

Holdin' a Good Hand is the ninth studio album by American country music singer Lee Greenwood. The album was released on July 10, 1990, by Capitol Records.

== Track listing ==
No.	Title	Writer(s)	Length
1.	"We've Got It Made"	Bob Regan; Sandy Ramos	3:22
2.	"I Still Look for You"	Michael Noble; Carl Struch	3:49
3.	"Enough Already"	Robert Byrne; Rick Bowles	3:21
4.	"Love Lying Next to Me"	Jerry Vandiver; Michael James	3:11
5.	"Whose Fool I Wanna Be"	Paul Nelson; Gene Nelson	3:45
6.	"Holdin' a Good Hand"	Rob Crosby; Johnny Few	2:47
7.	"Just Like Me"	Debbie Hupp; Bob Morrison	3:31
8.	"Giving Up the Ghost (That's Haunting Me)"	Regan; Ramos	3:09
9.	"Moment You Were Mine"	Steve Dorff; Beth Nielsen Chapman	3:47
10.	"Another Year of Love"	Ramos; Tom Paden	3:49
Total length:			34:12

== Charts ==
Chart (1990)	Peak position
US Top Country Albums (Billboard)	69
