= Someone (Lee Greenwood song) =

Single by Lee Greenwood

from the album If There's Any Juatice
- B-side: "Let's Make the Most of Love"
- Released: May 9, 1987
- Genre: Country
- Length: 3:10
- Label: MCA
- Songwriter(s): Steve Dorff, Charlie Black, Austin Roberts
- Producer(s): Jimmy Bowen, Lee Greenwood

Lee Greenwood singles chronology
"Mornin' Ride" (1987)	"Someone" (1987)	"If There's Any Justice" (1987)

"Someone" is a song written by Steve Dorff, Charlie Black and Austin Roberts, and recorded by American country music artist Lee Greenwood. It was released in May 1987 as the first single from the album If There's Any Justice. The song reached #5 on the Billboard Hot Country Singles & Tracks chart.

== Chart performance ==
Chart (1987)	Peak position
US Hot Country Songs (Billboard)	5
Canadian RPM Country Tracks	3
