= If There's Any Justice (album) =

Studio album by Lee Greenwood
- Released: June 15, 1987
- Recorded: 1987
- Genre: Country
- Length: 43:48
- Label: MCA Records
- Producer: Jimmy Bowen, Lee Greenwood

Lee Greenwood chronology
Love Will Find Its Way to You (1986)	If There's Any Justice (1987)	This Is My Country (1988)

Singles from If There's Any Justice
- 1. "Someone" Released: May 9, 1987; 2. "If There's Any Justice" Released: August 17, 1987; 3. "Touch and Go Crazy" Released: December 14, 1987

If There's Any Justice is the sixth studio album by American country music singer Lee Greenwood. The album was released on June 15, 1987, by MCA Records.

== Track listing ==
No.	Title	Writer(s)	Length
1.	"If There's Any Justice"	Tony Colton; Michael Noble; C. Michael Spriggs	4:09
2.	"We Could Have Been"	John Barlow Jarvis; Don Cook	3:48
3.	"Somebody Stop Me (Before I Love Again)"	Kerry Chater; Bill LaBounty; Beckie Foster	2:46
4.	"My Lover's Eyes"	Lee Greenwood	4:22
5.	"Let's Make the Most of Love"	Janis Ian; Kye Fleming	2:48
6.	"Touch and Go Crazy"	Tom Shapiro; Michael Garvin; Bucky Jones	2:52
7.	"Someone"	Steve Dorff; Charlie Black; Austin Roberts	3:08
8.	"I'm Here to Love You"	Josh Leo; Larry Lee	3:25
9.	"Silver Dollar"	Greenwood; Pat Bunch; Pam Rose; Mary Ann Kennedy	5:00
10.	"Somebody's Leaving"	Curly Putman; Rafe Van Hoy; Cook	3:15
Total length:			43:48

== Personnel ==
- Larry Byrom - electric guitar
- Glen Campbell - background vocals
- Laddie Cane - background vocals
- Lee Greenwood - lead vocals, background vocals, saxophone
- David Hungate - bass guitar
- John Barlow Jarvis - piano, DX-7
- Mary Ann Kennedy - background vocals
- Mike Lawler - synthesizer
- Rick Marotta - drums
- Pam Rose - background vocals
- Tony Smith - background vocals
- Billy Joe Walker Jr. - acoustic guitar, electric guitar
- Reggie Young - electric guitar

== Charts ==
Chart (1987)	Peak position
US Top Country Albums (Billboard)	38
