= I Still Believe (Lee Greenwood song) =

Single by Lee Greenwood

from the album This Is My Country
- B-side: "I'll Be Lovin' You"
- Released: April 30, 1988
- Genre: Country
- Length: 3:44
- Label: MCA
- Songwriter(s): Doug Johnson
- Producer(s): Jimmy Bowen, Lee Greenwood

Lee Greenwood singles chronology
"Touch and Go Crazy" (1987)	"I Still Believe" (1988)	"You Can't Fall in Love When You're Cryin'" (1988)

"I Still Believe" is a song written by Doug Johnson, and recorded by American country music artist Lee Greenwood. It was released in April 1988 as the first single from the album This Is My Country. The song reached #12 on the Billboard Hot Country Singles & Tracks chart.

== Chart performance ==
Chart (1988)	Peak position
US Hot Country Songs (Billboard)	12
Canadian RPM Country Tracks	18
