= The Gift (The McCarters song) =

Single by The McCarters

from the album The Gift
- B-side: "Loving You"
- Released: May 1988
- Genre: Country
- Label: Warner Bros.
- Songwriter(s): Nancy Montgomery
- Producer(s): Paul Worley

The McCarters singles chronology
| "Timeless and True Love" (1987) | "The Gift" (1988) | "I Give You Music" (1988) |

"The Gift" is a song written by Nancy Montgomery, and recorded by American country music trio The McCarters. It was released in May 1988 as the second single and title track from their album The Gift. The song peaked at number 4 on the Billboard Hot Country Singles chart.

== Charts ==
=== Weekly charts ===
| Chart (1988) | Peak position |
|---|---|
| US Hot Country Songs (Billboard) | 4 |
| Canadian RPM Country Tracks | 2 |

=== Year-end charts ===
| Chart (1988) | Position |
|---|---|
| Canadian RPM Country Tracks | 16 |
| US Hot Country Songs (Billboard) | 53 |
