= I'll Be Lovin' You =

Single by Lee Greenwood

from the album This Is My Country
- B-side: "Do That to Me One More Time"
- Released: January 28, 1989
- Genre: Country
- Length: 4:12
- Label: MCA
- Songwriter(s): Paul Overstreet, Don Schlitz
- Producer(s): Jimmy Bowen, Lee Greenwood

Lee Greenwood singles chronology
"You Can't Fall in Love When You're Cryin'" (1988)	"I'll Be Lovin' You" (1989)	"I Love the Way He Left You" (1989)

"I'll Be Lovin' You" is a song written by Paul Overstreet and Don Schlitz, and recorded by American country music artist Lee Greenwood. It was released in January 1989 as the third single from the album This Is My Country. The song reached #16 on the Billboard Hot Country Singles & Tracks chart.

== Chart performance ==
Chart (1989)	Peak position
US Hot Country Songs (Billboard)	16
Canadian RPM Country Tracks	19
