= You Can't Fall in Love When You're Cryin' =

Single by Lee Greenwood

from the album This Is My Country
- B-side: "I'll Still Be Lovin' You"
- Released: August 20, 1988
- Genre: Country
- Length: 3:53
- Label: MCA
- Songwriter: Lee Greenwood
- Producers: Jimmy Bowen, Lee Greenwood

Lee Greenwood singles chronology
"I Still Believe" (1988)	"You Can't Fall in Love When You're Cryin'" (1988)	"I'll Be Lovin' You" (1989)

"You Can't Fall in Love When You're Cryin'" is a song written and recorded by American country music artist Lee Greenwood. It was released in August 1988 as the second single from the album This Is My Country. The song reached #20 on the Billboard Hot Country Singles & Tracks chart.

== Chart performance ==
Chart (1988)	Peak position
US Hot Country Songs (Billboard)	20
Canadian RPM Country Tracks	21
