= I Don't Mind the Thorns (If You're the Rose) =

Single by Lee Greenwood

from the album Streamline
- B-side: "Same Old Song"
- Released: July 1985
- Genre: Country
- Length: 3:22
- Label: MCA
- Songwriter(s): Jan Buckingham; Linda Young
- Producer(s): Jerry Crutchfield

Lee Greenwood singles chronology
"Dixie Road" (1985)	"I Don't Mind the Thorns (If You're the Rose)" (1985)	"Don't Underestimate My Love for You" (1985)

"I Don't Mind the Thorns (If You're the Rose)" is a song written by Jan Buckingham and Linda Young and recorded by American country music artist Lee Greenwood. It was released in July 1985 as the lead single from the album Streamline. The song was Greenwood's fourth number one on the country chart. The single went to number one for one week and spent a total of fifteen weeks on the country chart.

== Chart performance ==
Chart (1985)	Peak position
US Hot Country Songs (Billboard)	1
Canadian RPM Country Tracks	1
