= Timeless and True Love =

Single by The McCarters

from the album The Gift
- B-side: "My Songbird"
- Released: December 1987
- Genre: Country
- Length: 2:35
- Label: Warner Bros.
- Songwriter(s): Charlie Black; Austin Roberts; Buzz Cason
- Producer(s): Paul Worley

The McCarters singles chronology
"Timeless and True Love" (1987)	"The Gift" (1988)

"Timeless and True Love" is a song written by Buzz Cason, Charlie Black and Austin Roberts, recorded by American country music trio The McCarters. It was released in December 1987 as the first single from their album The Gift. The song peaked at number 5 on the Billboard Hot Country Singles chart.

== Charts ==
=== Weekly charts ===
Chart (1987–1988)	Peak position
US Hot Country Songs (Billboard)	5
Canadian RPM Country Tracks	6

=== Year-end charts ===
Chart (1988)	Position
US Hot Country Songs (Billboard)	59
