= Don't Underestimate My Love for You =

Single by Lee Greenwood

from the album Streamline
- B-side: "Leave My Heart the Way You Found It"
- Released: November 1985
- Genre: Country
- Length: 3:03
- Label: MCA
- Songwriters: Dave Loggins; Steve Dorff; Steve Diamond
- Producer: Jerry Crutchfield

Lee Greenwood singles chronology
"I Don't Mind the Thorns (If You're the Rose)'" (1985)	"Don't Underestimate My Love for You" (1985)	"Hearts Aren't Made to Break (They're Made to Love)" (1986)

"Don't Underestimate My Love for You" is a song written by Dave Loggins, Steve Dorff and Steve Diamond, and recorded by American country music artist Lee Greenwood. It was released in November 1985 as the second single from the album Streamline. Greenwood's fifth number one country single in the United States, it spent one week at the top of the Billboard country chart in March 1986 and twelve weeks on the chart overall.

== Chart performance ==
Chart (1985–1986)	Peak position
US Hot Country Songs (Billboard)	1
Canadian RPM Country Tracks	1
