= Touch and Go Crazy =

Single by Lee Greenwood

from the album If There's Any Justice
- B-side: "Silver Dollar"
- Released: December 14, 1987
- Genre: Country
- Length: 2:54
- Label: MCA
- Songwriter(s): Tom Shapiro, Michael Garvin, Bucky Jones
- Producer(s): Jimmy Bowen, Lee Greenwood

Lee Greenwood singles chronology
"If There's Any Justice" (1987)	"Touch and Go Crazy" (1987)	"I Still Believe" (1988)

"Touch and Go Crazy" is a song written by Tom Shapiro, Michael Garvin and Bucky Jones, and recorded by American country music artist Lee Greenwood. It was released in December 1987 as the third single from the album If There's Any Justice. The song reached number 5 on the Billboard Hot Country Singles & Tracks chart.

== Chart performance ==
"Touch and Go Crazy" debuted at number 59 on the U.S. Billboard Hot Country Singles & Tracks for the week of December 26, 1987.

=== Weekly charts ===
Chart (1987–1988)	Peak position
US Hot Country Songs (Billboard)	5
Canadian RPM Country Tracks	3

=== Year-end charts ===
Chart (1988)	Position
US Hot Country Songs (Billboard)	79
