= The McCarters =

American country music band

- Also known as: Jennifer McCarter & the McCarters
- Origin: Sevierville, Tennessee, U.S.
- Genre: Country
- Years active: 1987–1990
- Label: Warner Bros.
- Past members: Jennifer McCarter; Lisa McCarter; Teresa McCarter

The McCarters were an American country music trio, composed of sisters Jennifer, Lisa, and Teresa McCarter. They recorded two albums for Warner Records Nashville between 1988 and 1990. These albums accounted for three top-ten singles on the Billboard Hot Country Songs charts: "Timeless and True Love", "The Gift", and "Up and Gone". The trio disbanded in 1990.

== Biography ==
The McCarters consisted of Jennifer McCarter (born March 7, 1964) and her two sisters, twins Lisa and Teresa (born November 21, 1966). The three of them performed locally in Sevierville, Tennessee, for many years, starting when Jennifer was nine years old. After they had reached adulthood, Jennifer contacted record producer Kyle Lehning as she liked his production work with Randy Travis. She convinced Lehning to listen to a fifteen-minute audition, after which Lehning recommended them to Warner Records Nashville. The trio was signed to the label in 1987, where they recorded their debut album The Gift. This album charted three singles on the Billboard Hot Country Songs charts: "Timeless and True Love", "The Gift", and "I Give You Music". An uncredited review in RPM praised this album for having a folk music influence and vocal harmony. They supported The Gift with a worldwide tour opening for Randy Travis and an appearance on Dolly Parton's Dolly variety show.

In 1989, the trio renamed themselves Jennifer McCarter & the McCarters, as they thought the group's name should better reflect Jennifer's role as lead vocalist. The trio also received a nomination by the American Music Awards for Favorite Country New Artist, losing to Patty Loveless. They recorded a second album for Warner entitled Better Be Home Soon for release in 1990. Lead single "Up and Gone" made top ten on the country charts in 1989, but further singles were less successful. They were released from Warner Records in the early 1990s, soon after their second album.

In 2012 Jennifer McCarter released a single, “Love Will”.

== Discography ==
=== Albums ===
Year	Title	US Country
1988	The Gift	36
1990	Better Be Home Soon (as Jennifer McCarter and The McCarters)	—

=== Singles ===
Year	Title	Chart Positions		Album
Year	Title	US Country	CAN Country	Album
1987	"Timeless and True Love"	5	6	The Gift
1988	"The Gift"	4	2	The Gift
1988	"I Give You Music"	28	16	The Gift
1989	"Up and Gone"	9	5	Better Be Home Soon (as Jennifer McCarter and The McCarters)
1989	"Quit While I'm Behind"	26	28	Better Be Home Soon (as Jennifer McCarter and The McCarters)
1990	"Better Be Home Soon"	73	65	Better Be Home Soon (as Jennifer McCarter and The McCarters)
1990	"Shot Full of Love"	73	48	Better Be Home Soon (as Jennifer McCarter and The McCarters)

== Awards and nominations ==
Year	Organization	Award	Nominee/Work	Result
1989	American Music Awards	Favorite Country New Artist	The McCarters	Nominated
