= Hearts Aren't Made to Break (They're Made to Love) =

Single by Lee Greenwood

from the album Streamline
- B-side: "Will to Love"
- Released: April 1986
- Genre: Country
- Length: 2:58
- Label: MCA
- Songwriter(s): Steve Dean; Roger Murrah
- Producer(s): Jerry Crutchfield

Lee Greenwood singles chronology
"Don't Underestimate My Love for You" (1985)	"Hearts Aren't Made to Break (They're Made to Love)" (1986)	"Didn't We" (1986)

"Hearts Aren't Made to Break (They're Made to Love)" is a song written by Roger Murrah and Steve Dean, and recorded by American country music artist Lee Greenwood. It was released in April 1986 as the third single from the album Streamline. The song was Greenwood's sixth number one on the country chart. The single went to number one for one week and spent a total of fourteen weeks on the country chart.

== Chart performance ==
Chart (1986)	Peak position
US Hot Country Songs (Billboard)	1
Canadian RPM Country Tracks	1
