= Mornin' Ride =

Single by Lee Greenwood

from the album Love Will Find Its Way to You
- B-side: "Little Red Caboose"
- Released: November 1986
- Genre: Country
- Length: 3:24
- Label: MCA
- Songwriter(s): Steve Bogard; Jeff Tweel
- Producer(s): Jerry Crutchfield

Lee Greenwood singles chronology
"Didn't We" (1986)	"Mornin' Ride" (1986)	"Someone" (1987)

"Mornin' Ride" is a song written by Steve Bogard and Jeff Tweel, and recorded by American country music artist Lee Greenwood. It was released in November 1986 as the second single from the album Love Will Find Its Way to You. The song was Greenwood's seventh number one country single. The single went to number one for one week and spent a total of fifteen weeks on the country chart. Vince Gill and Larry Stewart sang background vocals on this song.

== Charts ==
=== Weekly charts ===
Chart (1986–1987)	Peak position
US Hot Country Songs (Billboard)	1
Canadian RPM Country Tracks	1

=== Year-end charts ===
Chart (1987)	Position
US Hot Country Songs (Billboard)	15
