= Talkin' to Myself Again =

Single by Tammy Wynette

from the album Higher Ground
- B-side: "A Slow Burning Fire"
- Released: November 1987
- Recorded: March 1987
- Studio: Nashville, Tennessee, U.S.
- Genre: Country
- Length: 3:19
- Label: Epic
- Songwriter: Jamie O'Hara
- Producer: Steve Buckingham

Tammy Wynette singles chronology
"Your Love" (1987)	"Talkin' to Myself Again" (1987)	"Beneath a Painted Sky" (1988)

"Talkin' to Myself Again" is a song written by Jamie O'Hara, and recorded by American country music artist Tammy Wynette. It was released in November 1987 as the second single from the album Higher Ground.

The song was featured in the second trailer for the 2026 video game Grand Theft Auto VI, released in May 2025. It also appears in the game itself on the in-game country station Back Country Radio.

== Background and reception ==
"Talkin' to Myself Again" was recorded in March 1987 in Nashville, Tennessee. The recording session included additional tracks that would later appear on Wynette's 1987 album. Although not officially credited on the single release, it featured harmony vocals from The O'Kanes. The session included several other notable artists performing on background vocals as well. The session was produced by Steve Buckingham.

The song reached number 16 on the Billboard Hot Country Singles chart. "Talkin' to Myself Again" became Wynette's second single to become a major hit since 1985's "Sometimes When We Touch". It was released on her 1987 studio album Higher Ground.

== Track listing ==
7" vinyl single

- "Talkin' to Myself Again" – 3:19
- "A Slow Burning Fire" – 3:05

== Charts ==
Chart (1987–88)	Peak position
US Hot Country Singles (Billboard)	16
Canada Country Singles (RPM)	23
