= This Is My Country (Lee Greenwood album) =

1988 album by Lee Greenwood

Studio album by Lee Greenwood
- Released: May 16, 1988
- Recorded: 1988
- Genre: Country
- Length: 35:56
- Label: MCA
- Producer: Jimmy Bowen; Lee Greenwood

Lee Greenwood chronology
If There's Any Justice (1987)	This Is My Country (1988)	Greatest Hits Volume Two (1989)

Singles from This Is My Country
- 1. "I Still Believe" Released: April 30, 1988; 2. "You Can't Fall in Love When You're Cryin'" Released: August 20, 1988; 3. "I'll Be Lovin' You" Released: January 28, 1989

This Is My Country is the seventh studio album by American country music singer Lee Greenwood. The album was released on May 16, 1988, by MCA Records.

== Track listing ==
No.	Title	Writer(s)	Length
1.	"I'll Be Lovin' You"	Paul Overstreet; Don Schlitz	4:08
2.	"I Still Believe"	Doug Johnson	3:41
3.	"Mountain Right"	Michael Garvin; Jeff Tweel	4:26
4.	"Ruby"	Mitchell Parish; Heinz Roemheld	3:59
5.	"You Can't Fall in Love When You're Cryin'"	Lee Greenwood	3:51
6.	"Lola's Love"	Dennis Linde	2:52
7.	"Do That to Me One More Time"	Toni Tennille	3:38
8.	"Tennessee Waltz"	Redd Stewart; Pee Wee King	3:54
9.	"I'll Still Be Lovin' You"	Steve Eaton	2:50
10.	"As If I Didn't Know"	Sonny Tillis; Hal Bynum	3:37
Total length:			35:56

== Personnel ==
- Paul Franklin - steel guitar, dobro
- Johnny Gimble - fiddle
- Jon Goin - acoustic guitar
- Greg Gordon - background vocals
- Lee Greenwood - lead vocals, background vocals, tenor saxophone
- Michael L. Holton - trumpet
- Dann Huff - electric guitar
- David Hungate - bass guitar
- Chris McDonald - trombone
- Rick Marotta - drums, percussion, congas
- J.D. Martin - background vocals
- Matt Rollings - keyboards
- Dennis Solee - baritone saxophone
- Larry Strickland - background vocals
- Curtis Young - background vocals

== Charts ==
Chart (1988)	Peak position
US Top Country Albums (Billboard)	25
