= Lee Greenwood =

American country singer (born 1942)

- Greenwood in 2026

Member of the National Council on the Arts
- In office November 2008 – February 2022
- Nominated by: George W. Bush
- President: George W. Bush; Barack Obama; Donald Trump; Joe Biden
- Preceded by: Makoto Fujimura
- Succeeded by: Kamilah Forbes

Personal details
- Born: Melvin Lee Greenwood; October 27, 1942 (age 84) South Gate, California, U.S.
- Party: Republican
- Spouses: Edna Greenwood (m. 1960, divorced) Roberta Taylor (m. 1965; div. 1977) Melanie Cronk (m. 1980, divorced) Kimberly Payne (m. 1992)
- Children: 6
- Musical career
- Genres: Country; pop
- Occupations: Singer; songwriter
- Instruments: Vocals; saxophone; piano
- Years active: 1962–present
- Labels: MCA Records; Capitol Records; Liberty Records; Curb Records; Country Crossing
- Website: leegreenwood.com

Melvin Lee Greenwood (born October 27, 1942) is an American country music singer. Active since 1962, he won a Grammy Award and has had 33 singles chart on the Hot Country Songs with seven singles reaching No. 1. He has sold more than 25 million copies worldwide.

Greenwood is known for his signature song "God Bless the U.S.A.”, which was originally released in the spring of 1984 and became a popular song. In the summer of 1984, it was included in a film about President Ronald Reagan, the Republican presidential nominee and incumbent, which was shown at the 1984 Republican National Convention. "God Bless the U.S.A." gained prominence during the 1988 United States presidential election campaign, when Greenwood performed the song at the 1988 Republican National Convention and at rallies for the Republican nominee, George H. W. Bush. The song was also featured in television advertisements for Bush. It later became popular again during the Gulf War, after the September 11 attacks (becoming his highest charting pop hit and reaching No. 16 on the Billboard Hot 100), and during the 2016, 2020 and 2024 United States presidential elections as Donald Trump's rally introduction track.

His seven number-ones on the U.S. Hot Country Songs list in his career are "Somebody's Gonna Love You", "Going, Going, Gone", "Dixie Road", "I Don't Mind the Thorns (If You're the Rose)", "Don't Underestimate My Love For You", "Hearts Aren't Made to Break (They're Made to Love)", and "Mornin' Ride". His 1983 single "I.O.U." was also a top-five hit on the adult contemporary charts, and a No. 53 on the Billboard Hot 100.

== Background ==
Greenwood was born in 1942 in South Gate, California, adjacent to Los Angeles. He has German, English, Irish, and Scottish ancestry. His father joined the U.S. Navy after the bombing of Pearl Harbor; his mother was a piano player who had several jobs. After his parents separated, he grew up in Sacramento on the farm of his maternal grandparents. At the age of seven, he started singing in church.

Greenwood did not serve in the United States military, despite there being a universal draft at the time. He has said that he was given a 3A deferment for family hardship due to becoming a father at 17. He eloped to Reno, Nevada with his first wife, Edna, in 1960.

== Career ==
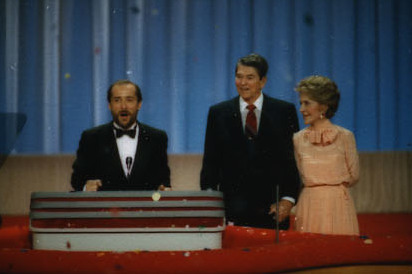
Greenwood performing at the 1988 Republican National Convention, shown alongside President Ronald Reagan and Nancy Reagan

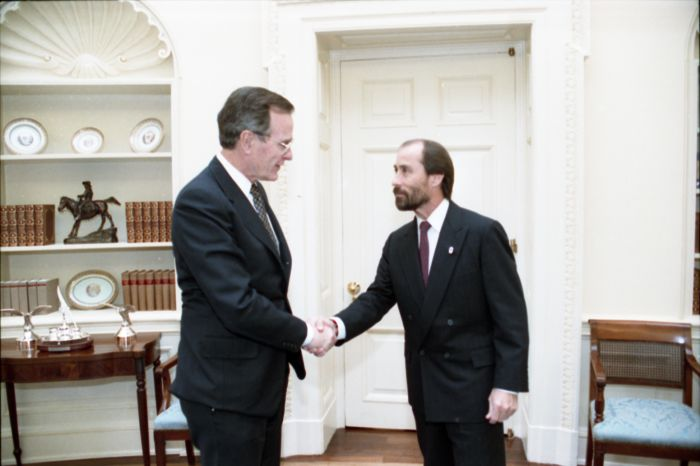
Greenwood in the Oval Office with President George H. W. Bush in 1991

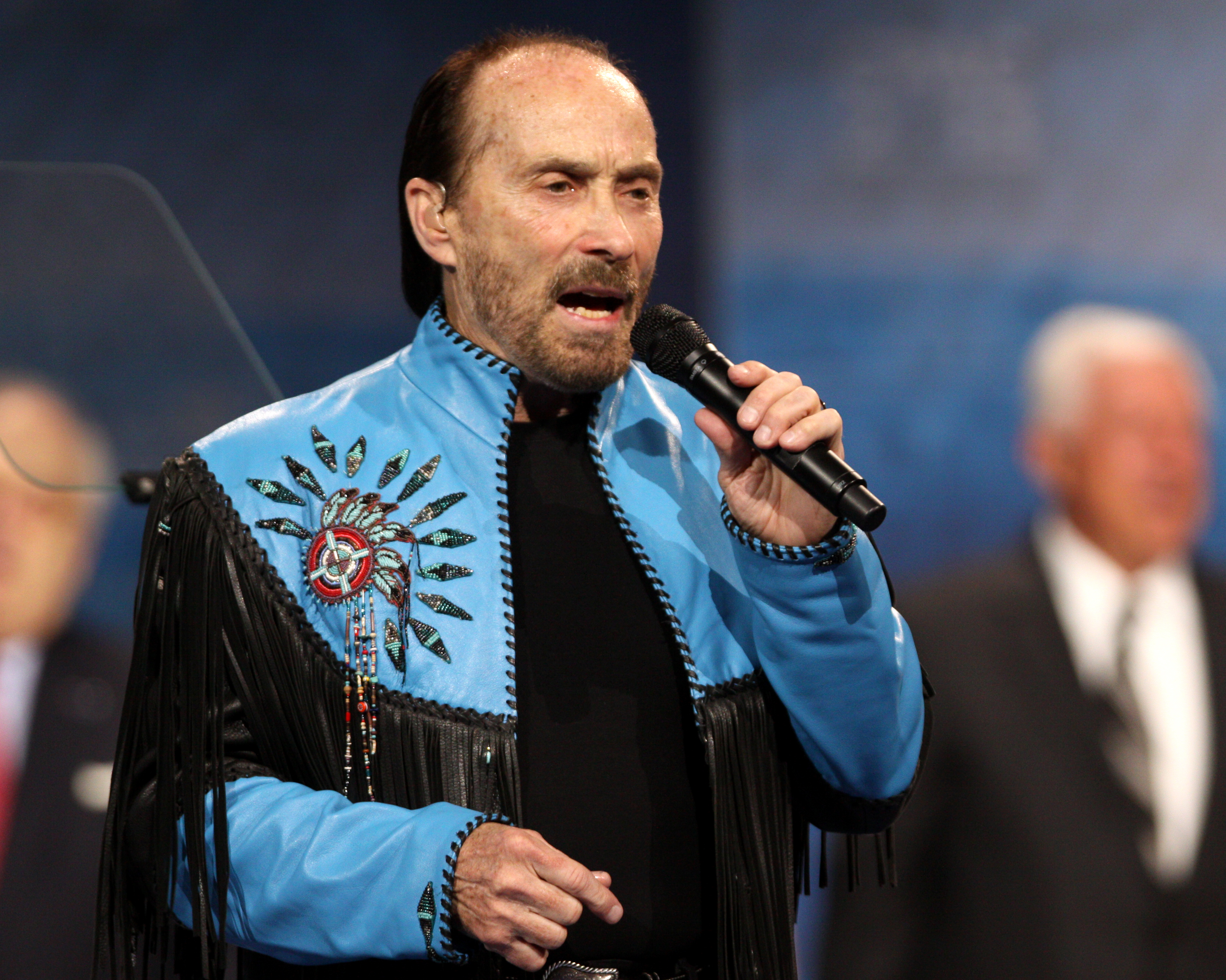
Greenwood performing "God Bless the USA" at the 2013 Conservative Political Action Conference in Oxon Hill, Maryland

Greenwood founded his first band, The Apollos, in 1962. The band, which changed its name later to the Lee Greenwood Affair, played mostly pop music and appeared mostly in casinos in Las Vegas. In 1969, he joined the Chester Smith Band and appeared for the first time on television. A short time later, he worked with a country singer, Del Reeves. A few records were recorded in Los Angeles with Paramount Records. After the band broke up in the 1970s, Greenwood moved back to Las Vegas, where he worked as a blackjack dealer during the day and as a singer at night.

In 1979, he was "discovered" in Reno by Larry McFaden, the bandleader and bassist for Mel Tillis. After making some demo tapes, Greenwood was signed in 1981 by the Nashville division of MCA Records (which had recently absorbed the Paramount label), and McFaden became his manager.

The first single, the Jan Crutchfield-penned "It Turns Me Inside Out", made it to the top 20 of the country chart in 1981. The song had been written for Kenny Rogers. Rogers recorded a version but decided to pass on it due to the sheer volume of songs he had been offered to record at the time. "Ring on Her Finger, Time on Her Hands" landed Greenwood in the country top 10. Each song was marketed heavily, particularly in the South Florida market. Greenwood is known for writing and recording "God Bless the U.S.A." in the early 1980s, and later "God Bless You Canada". The song had renewed popularity after the Gulf War began in 1991, and again 10 years later right after the September 11 attacks. "God Bless the U.S.A." re-entered the top 20 of the country charts in late 2001. Since then, he has played across the U.S., at many public events.

Greenwood performed on the eve of the January 2017 inauguration of Donald Trump. Trump used "God Bless the U.S.A." as one of his campaign songs during the 2016 presidential election, the 2018 midterm elections, and again during the 2020 presidential election. On May 19, 2018, Lee Greenwood was inducted into the Mississippi Music Project Hall of Fame by "Commander" Joseph W. Clark, for his contributions to the music industry.

Greenwood appeared at the Republican convention on July 15, 2024, and performed "God Bless the U.S.A", while former President Trump, the party's presidential nominee, entered the arena. Greenwood also performed for Marsha Blackburn after her victory in her 2018 Senate election. He also performed at the United States Army 250th Anniversary Parade and celebration on June 14, 2025.

== National Council on the Arts ==
In September 2008, President George W. Bush nominated Greenwood to succeed Makoto Fujimura for a six-year term to the National Council on the Arts expiring in 2014. He was confirmed by the Senate via voice vote in October 2008. In 2015, President Barack Obama nominated Esperanza Spalding to succeed Greenwood; however, the nomination was not acted upon by the Senate, allowing Greenwood to continue serving until President Joe Biden nominated, and the Senate confirmed, a successor, Kamilah Forbes.

== Theater ==
In 1995, Greenwood took a break from his touring schedule and built a theater in Sevierville, Tennessee, which opened its doors in April 1996 giving him the opportunity to perform daily shows in addition to being with his family. According to an article in the Wilkes-Barre Times Leader, Greenwood had considered building the 1,800-seat theater in Minneapolis, San Antonio; Myrtle Beach, South Carolina; and Branson, Missouri. He eventually settled on eastern Tennessee as being the most lucrative area: “The numbers in east Tennessee were far greater than anywhere else in the country, except Orlando, Florida, as a destination point for entertainment,” Greenwood said, lauding its proximity to Gatlinburg and Pigeon Forge, Tennessee. The Lee Greenwood Theater operated for five seasons, then closed for Greenwood to continue touring. The former theater building now hosts a church.

== Controversy ==
In May 2021, to commemorate the September 11 attacks, Greenwood published the God Bless the U.S.A. Bible. The edition of the Bible has the U.S. flag on its leather cover and includes the texts of the Declaration of Independence, the Constitution, the Bill of Rights, the Pledge of Allegiance, and a chorus of "God Bless the USA" in Greenwood's handwriting. The augmentations have sparked controversy among certain Christians, who argue that it violates Scriptural prohibitions, such as those contained in Deuteronomy 4:2 and Revelation 22:18, against "add(ing) anything" to "the commands of the Lord your God." The text of Greenwood's edition of the Bible was intended to be the New International Version, but rights holder Zondervan declined to allow its use. Greenwood's Bible instead used the King James Version, which is in the public domain in the United States. Greenwood's Bible reappeared in the news during 2024 when Donald Trump promoted a new edition printed in China and sold at a 1600 percent markup.

== Family ==
Greenwood has been married five times to four women. He married his first wife Edna at age 17, whom he divorced and remarried. His second wife was Melanie Cronk, and the third was Roberta Taylor. He has four children from his earlier marriages.

In 1992, Greenwood married Kimberly Payne, former Miss Tennessee USA. They have two children.

== Discography ==
Studio albums

- Inside Out (1982)
- Somebody's Gonna Love You (1983)
- You've Got a Good Love Comin' (1984)
- Meant for Each Other (with Barbara Mandrell) (1984)
- Streamline (1985)
- Christmas to Christmas (1985)
- Love Will Find Its Way to You (1986)
- If There's Any Justice (1987)
- This Is My Country (1988)
- If Only for One Night (1989)
- Holdin' a Good Hand (1990)
- A Perfect 10 (1991)
- When You're in Love (1991)
- American Patriot (1992)
- Love's on the Way (1992)
- Totally Devoted to You (1995)
- Wounded Heart (1998)
- Same River Different Bridge (2000)
- Good Old Country (2000)
- Have Yourself a Merry Little Christmas (2001)
- Inspirational Songs (2002)
- Stronger Than Time (2003)
