= Trumped! (book) =

1991 book about Donald Trump

Trumped! The Inside Story of the Real Donald Trump – His Cunning Rise and Spectacular Fall
- Authors: John R. O'Donnell; James Rutherford
- Language: English
- Subject: Donald Trump
- Publisher: Simon & Schuster
- Publication date: May 10, 1991; 35 years ago
- Publication place: United States
- Media type: Print
- Pages: 348
- ISBN: 067173735X

Trumped! The Inside Story of the Real Donald Trump – His Cunning Rise and Spectacular Fall is a 1991 book about Donald Trump that was written by John R. O'Donnell and James Rutherford, and published by Simon & Schuster. Prior to writing the book, O'Donnell worked for Trump for three years, including one year as the president and chief operating officer of the Trump Plaza Hotel and Casino in Atlantic City, New Jersey. In the book, O'Donnell asserts that Trump is racist, cheap, and an incompetent businessman.

== Background and publication ==
O'Donnell had worked for Donald Trump for three years. In the final year, O'Donnell worked as the president and chief operating officer of the Trump Plaza Hotel and Casino in Atlantic City, New Jersey. In October 1989, three top executives for The Trump Organization were killed when their helicopter crashed. Trump expressed his condolences, and stated that he had chosen not to board the helicopter shortly before it crashed.

O'Donnell had been passed over for a key position, and angrily quit his job at Trump Plaza in April 1990, after stating that Trump criticized Stephen Hyde, who ran Trump's Atlantic City operations and was killed in the helicopter crash. O'Donnell went to work as executive vice president and chief operating officer for Trump's competitor, Merv Griffin's Resorts Casino Hotel. O'Donnell said that when Trump discovered the book was being written, he tried to intimidate O'Donnell into cancelling the project. James Rutherford, the book's co-author, was a freelance writer from New Jersey. Trumped! was published by Simon & Schuster on May 10, 1991.

== Summary ==
O'Donnell claimed in the book that Trump exploited the 1989 helicopter crash by bragging that he had come close to death. According to O'Donnell, Trump had never been scheduled to board the helicopter. O'Donnell also outlined several business deals that Trump had wanted, and which ultimately did not work out as planned, which contributed to financial difficulties that began for Trump in 1990. According to O'Donnell, Trump blamed other people for the failed deals, including the deceased Trump Organization employees who died in the helicopter crash. O'Donnell stated that the failed deals were the "practical consequences of Donald's ego." Additionally, O'Donnell wrote that Trump was irrational, and ignorant of basic facts regarding the casino business. Other claims about Trump were also made by O'Donnell in the book:

- Trump has a fear of disease and of baldness.
- Trump used crude language. O'Donnell described an instance where Trump said to him about girlfriend Marla Maples: "God, I wish you could see her body! . . . If you could take one look at it, just one look, you wouldn't believe it. It's unbelievable. Better than a ten."
- Trump is racist. O'Donnell quotes Trump as saying: "Black guys counting my money! I hate it. The only kind of people I want counting my money are short guys that wear yarmulkes every day."
- Trump is cheaply frugal. O'Donnell states that Trump reneged on promises to give bonuses to his executives and that he "never tipped anyone ... not even his drivers."

== Reception ==
Joseph Nocera of Entertainment Weekly gave Trumped! a "B" and stated that "the sensation of reading O'Donnell's book is not that of shock. It is instead the feeling of having one's suspicions confirmed. Which, I might add, is not altogether unpleasurable." Nocera also wrote that the book "is unquestionably motivated by O'Donnell's anger at Trump for disparaging" the three deceased executives, "Yet this is a surprisingly honorable kiss and tell. Despite the juicy tidbits, the tone is low-key and evenhanded. There is context here."

Michael M. Thomas of the Los Angeles Times called Trumped! "an interesting book, but a narrow one." Thomas said, "The best and most riveting parts of O'Donnell's spritely book are those which educate the reader in the marketing techniques and considerations which are the essence of running a profitable gambling operation on an industrial scale."

Susan Lee of The New York Times recommended the book "if you want to know more" about Trump, stating that "if you always suspected that beneath his crude, callow, shallow exterior lay a crude, callow, shallow interior, read 'Trumped!' It will give you the pleasure of knowing that you were right." Trump criticized Lee's review, calling it "laughable" and stating, "It is obvious that she is not a fan of Donald Trump."

=== Response from Trump ===
At the time of the book's publication, David Cay Johnston of The Philadelphia Inquirer reported that Trump's then-assistant, Norma Foerderer, "had not read the book but understood that it was filled with mistakes and that the public would be well advised to ignore it." Later that year, Trump referred to O'Donnell as a "disgruntled former employee" and called the book "a dud."

In 1999, Trump again referred to O'Donnell as a "disgruntled employee" during an interview with Playboy; Trump also told the magazine: "Nobody has had worse things written about them than me. And here I am. The stuff O'Donnell wrote about me is probably true. The guy's a fucking loser. A fucking loser. I brought the guy in to work for me; it turns out he didn't know that much about what he was doing. I think I met the guy two or three times total. And this guy goes off and writes a book about me, like he knows me!"
