= Racial views of Donald Trump =

Donald Trump, the 45th and 47th president of the United States, has a history of speech and actions that have been viewed by scholars and the public as racist or sympathetic to white supremacy. Journalists, friends, family, and former employees have accused him of fueling racism in the United States. Trump has repeatedly denied accusations of racism.

In 1973, Trump and his company Trump Management were sued by the Department of Justice for housing discrimination against African-American renters; he settled the suit, entering into a consent decree to end the practices without admitting wrongdoing. From 2011 to 2016, Trump was a leading proponent of the debunked birther conspiracy theory falsely claiming president Barack Obama was not born in the United States. In a racially charged criminal case, Trump continued to state, as late as 2024, that a group known as the Central Park Five mostly made up of African American teenagers were responsible for the 1989 rape of a white woman in the Central Park jogger case, despite the five males having been officially exonerated in 2002. Trump launched his 2016 presidential campaign with a speech at Trump Tower, in which he falsely said that Mexico sends criminals to the border: "They're bringing drugs. They're bringing crime. They're rapists. And some, I assume, are good people." During the campaign, Trump stoked the fears of conservative white working class voters, creating the impression of global danger from groups that are deemed to pose a challenge to the nation.

Trump made comments following a 2017 white supremacist rally in Charlottesville, Virginia, that were seen by critics as implying moral equivalence between the white supremacist marchers and those who protested against them as "very fine people". Trump excluded white nationalists from the "very fine people" comment, stating that "I'm not talking about the neo-Nazis and the white nationalists, because they should be condemned totally". In 2018, during an Oval Office meeting about immigration reform, Trump referred to El Salvador, Haiti, and African countries as "shitholes", which critics condemned as a racist comment. In July 2019, Trump tweeted about four Democratic congresswomen of color, three of whom were American-born: "Why don't they go back and help fix the totally broken and crime-infested places from which they came. Then come back and show us how it is done." News outlets such as The Atlantic criticized this comment as a common racist trope. He later denied his comments were racist, saying "if somebody has a problem with our country, if somebody doesn't want to be in our country, they should leave."

Trump's controversial statements have been condemned by many observers around the world, but excused by some of his supporters as a rejection of political correctness and by others because they harbor similar racial beliefs. Several studies and surveys have shown that racial resentment has contributed to Trump's political ascendance, and has become more significant than economic factors in determining the party allegiance of U.S. voters. Racist and Islamophobic attitudes have been shown to be a powerful indicator of support for Trump.

== Pre-presidency ==
=== Housing discrimination cases ===
In 1973, the U.S. Department of Justice sued Trump Management, Donald Trump and his father Fred, for discrimination against African Americans in their renting practices.

Testers from the New York City Human Rights Division had found that prospective Black renters at Trump buildings were told there were no apartments available, while prospective white renters were offered apartments at the same buildings. During the investigation, four of Trump's agents admitted to using a "C" (for "colored") or "9" code to label Black applicants and stated that they were told their company "discouraged rental to blacks" or that they were "not allowed to rent to black tenants," and that prospective Black renters should be sent to the central office while white renters could have their applications accepted on site. Three doormen testified to being told to discourage prospective Black renters by lying about the rental prices or claiming no vacancies were available. A settlement was reached in 1975 where Trump agreed to familiarize himself with the Fair Housing Act, take out ads stating that Black renters were welcome, give a list of vacancies to the Urban League on a weekly basis, and allow the Urban League to present qualified candidates for 20% of vacancies in properties that were less than 10% non-white.

Elyse Goldweber, the Justice Department lawyer tasked with taking Trump's deposition, has stated that during a coffee break Trump said to her directly, "You know, you don't want to live with them either."

The Trump Organization was sued again in 1978 for violating terms of the 1975 settlement by continuing to refuse to rent to Black tenants; Trump and his lawyer Roy Cohn denied the charges. In 1983 the Metropolitan Action Institute noted that two Trump Village properties were still over 95% White.

=== Central Park jogger case ===
On the night of April 19, 1989, Trisha Meili was assaulted, raped, and sodomized in Manhattan's Central Park. On the night of the attack, five juvenile males—four African Americans and one of Hispanic descent—were apprehended in connection with a number of attacks in Central Park committed by around 30 teenage perpetrators. The prosecution ignored evidence suggesting there was a single perpetrator whose DNA did not match any of the suspects, instead using confessions that the suspects said were coerced and false. They were convicted in 1990 by juries in two separate trials, receiving sentences ranging from 5 to 15 years. The attacks were highly publicized in the media.

On May 1, 1989, Trump called for the return of the death penalty by taking out a full-page advertisement in all four of the city's major newspapers. He said he wanted the "criminals of every age" who were accused of beating and raping a jogger in Central Park "to be afraid." Trump told Larry King on CNN: "The problem with our society is the victim has absolutely no rights and the criminal has unbelievable rights" and, speaking of another case where a woman was raped and thrown out a window, "maybe hate is what we need if we're gonna get something done."

In 2002, an imprisoned serial rapist confessed to the jogger's rape, which was confirmed by DNA evidence, and the convictions of the five men were vacated. They sued New York City in 2003 for malicious prosecution, racial discrimination, and emotional distress. Lawyers for the five defendants said that Trump's advertisement had inflamed public opinion. The city settled the case for $41 million (~$54.8 million in 2025) in 2014. In June of that year, Trump called the settlement "a disgrace" and said that the group's guilt was still likely: "Settling doesn't mean innocence. [...] These young men do not exactly have the pasts of angels."

In October 2016, when Trump campaigned to be president, he said that Central Park Five were guilty and that their convictions should never have been vacated, attracting criticism from the Central Park Five themselves and others. Republican senator John McCain retracted his endorsement of Trump, citing in part "outrageous statements about the innocent men in the Central Park Five case." Yusuf Salaam, one of the five defendants, said that he had falsely confessed out of coercion, after having been mistreated by police while in custody. Filmmaker Ken Burns, who directed the documentary The Central Park Five that helped clear the names of the accused, called Trump's comments "the height of vulgarity" and "out and out racism".

In June 2019 in response to Ken Burns' documentary and the Netflix miniseries When They See Us, Trump stood by his previous statements, saying "You have people on both sides of that. They admitted their guilt. If you look at Linda Fairstein and if you look at some of the prosecutors, they think that the city should never have settled that case. So we'll leave it at that."

=== Black professionals ===
In a 1989 interview with Bryant Gumbel, Trump stated: "A well-educated Black has a tremendous advantage over a well-educated white in terms of the job market." Fortune magazine reported that Trump's statement was not confirmed by studies of factual evidence concerning the impact of an applicant's race on their job prospects.

In his 1991 book Trumped! John O'Donnell quoted Trump as allegedly saying:

I've got Black accountants at Trump Castle and at Trump Plaza. Black guys counting my money! I hate it. The only kind of people I want counting my money are short guys wearing yarmulkes.... Those are the only kind of people I want counting my money. Nobody else... Besides that, I've got to tell you something else. I think that the guy's lazy. And it's probably not his fault because laziness is a trait in Blacks.

Trump told Playboy magazine in an interview published in 1997, "The stuff O'Donnell wrote about me is probably true." Two years later, when seeking the nomination of the Reform Party for president, Trump denied having made the statement.

=== Native American casino industry ===
During the early 1990s, competition from an expanding Native American casino industry threatened his Atlantic City investments. During this period Trump stated that "nobody likes Indians as much as Donald Trump" but then claimed without evidence that the mob had infiltrated Native American casinos, that there was no way "Indians" or an "Indian chief" could stand up to the mob, implied that the casinos were not in fact owned by Native Americans based on the owners' appearance, and depicted Native Americans as greedy.

In 2000, Trump and his associates were fined $250,000 (equivalent to $440,000 in 2025) and publicly apologized for failing to reveal that they had financed advertisements criticizing the proposal of building more Native American casinos in the Catskill Mountains, which alluded to Mohawk Indians doing cocaine and bringing violence, asking: "Are these the new neighbors we want?" The advertisements, claiming to be funded by "grass-roots, pro-family" donors, were actually designed by Roger Stone, while Trump approved and financed the million-dollar venture.

In 1993, Trump argued in Congress with ranking U.S. House Committee on Natural Resources member George Miller over Native American casinos. Trump felt the competition would hurt his own gambling interests. Miller asked, "Is this you?," discussing Indian ethnicity: "We're going to judge people by whether they have Indian blood whether they're qualified to run a casino or not?'" Trump responded, "That probably is me, absolutely. Because, I'll tell you what. If you look at some of the reservations that you've approved, that you, sir in your great wisdom have approved, I'll tell you right now, they don't look like Indians to me." Miller responded, "Thank God that's not the test of whether or not people have rights in this country or not – whether or not they pass your 'look' test." In 2024, Ana Cabrera of MSNBC remarked, "Congressman George Miller of California, who confronted Trump in that 1993 clip, said that was the most irresponsible testimony he had heard in his 40 years in Congress."

=== The Apprentice ===
In April 2005, Trump appeared on Howard Stern's radio show, where Trump proposed that the fourth season of the television show The Apprentice would feature an exclusively white team of blondes competing against a team of only African-Americans. Stern asked Trump if that would start a "racial war", to which Trump replied: "it would be handled very beautifully by me ... I'm very diplomatic." The proposal was rejected by television executives at NBC. The actual fourth season of The Apprentice concluded with Trump asking the male African-American winner of the season, Randal Pinkett, to share the honor with the runner-up, a white woman. Pinkett called the act racist.

Trump has also been accused of using racial slurs during filming of The Apprentice. Former Apprentice contestant and former Trump administration communications director Omarosa Manigault Newman stated that Trump used "the N-word and others." Bill Pruitt, co-producer of Season One of The Apprentice has also stated that Trump used a racial slur during filming of the show.

=== "Muslim problem" remarks ===
In a 2011 interview on The O'Reilly Factor, asked by Bill O'Reilly if there was a "Muslim problem" in the world, Trump responded, "Absolutely ... I didn't notice Swedish people knocking down the World Trade Center." In 2015 he repeated similar lines.

== 2016 campaign ==
=== Mexican immigrants ===
During an interview with Don Lemon, he defended his statements about Mexican immigrants by rhetorically asking "Who is doing the raping?"

=== Hispanic judge ===
In 2013, the State of New York filed a $40 million (~$54.4 million in 2025) civil suit against Trump University alleging that the company had made false statements and defrauded consumers. Two class-action civil lawsuits were also filed naming Trump personally as well as his companies. During the presidential campaign, Trump criticized Judge Gonzalo P. Curiel who oversaw those two cases, alleging bias in his rulings because he is "a Mexican judge. He's of Mexican heritage." Although his parents immigrated from Mexico, Judge Curiel is an American citizen, born in East Chicago, Indiana. Trump said that Curiel would have "an absolute conflict" due to his Mexican heritage which led to accusations of racism. Speaker of the House and a Trump supporter, Republican Paul Ryan commented, "I disavow these comments. Claiming a person can't do the job because of their race is sort of like the textbook definition of a racist comment. I think that should be absolutely disavowed. It's absolutely unacceptable."

=== Hate crime ===
On August 19, 2015, two white men (who later pled guilty to the attack) assaulted a man who was sleeping outside the JFK/UMass station in Boston. Police detained the assailants, and one of them confessed his motivation for the attack: "Donald Trump was right, all these illegals need to be deported." Later that day, Trump, while at a news conference, was informed of the incident. He responded: "I haven't heard about that. It would be a shame...I will say that people who are following me are very passionate. They love this country and they want this country to be great again."

=== New Jersey Arabs ===
In 2015, Trump falsely claimed that he had seen television reports of "thousands and thousands" of Arab Americans in New Jersey celebrating as the World Trade Center collapsed during the 9/11 attacks.

=== Proposed Muslim registry ===
After the November 2015 Paris attacks, asked about a potential database tracking American Muslims, Trump said he "would certainly implement" it: "There should be a lot of systems, beyond databases."

=== "Islam hates us" remark ===
In a March 2016 interview with CNN's Anderson Cooper, Trump said: "I think Islam hates us. ... There's a tremendous hatred. We have to get to the bottom of it."

=== Remarks about the Khan family ===
In July 2016, Khizr Khan, whose son Humayun Khan was killed while serving in Iraq, spoke against Trump's proposed ban on Muslim immigration at the Democratic National Convention; his wife, Ghazala Khan, stood silently beside him. In an ABC interview, Trump insinuated that as a Muslim woman she was not allowed speak, saying, "she probably, maybe she wasn't allowed to have anything to say." Ghazala rejected the implication and called him "ignorant" about Islam.

=== Somali refugees ===
In August 2016, Trump campaigned in Maine, which has a large immigrant Somali population. At a rally he said, "We've just seen many, many crimes getting worse all the time, and as Maine knows—a major destination for Somali refugees—right, am I right?" Trump also alluded to risks of terrorism, referring to an incident in June 2016 when three young Somali men were found guilty of planning to join the Islamic State in Syria.

In Lewiston, home to the largest population of Maine Somalis, the police chief said Somalis have integrated into the city and they have not caused an increase in crime; crime is actually going down, not up. The mayor said Lewiston is safe and they all get along. At a Somali support rally following Trump's comments the Portland mayor welcomed the city's Somali residents, saying, "We need you here." Maine Republican US senator Susan Collins commented, "Mr. Trump's statements disparaging immigrants who have come to this country legally are particularly unhelpful. Maine has benefited from people from Europe, the Middle East, Asia, and, increasingly, Africa—including our friends from Somalia."

=== Racial accusations on Twitter and in debates ===
Prior to and during the 2016 campaign, Trump used his political platform to spread disparaging messages against various racial groups. Trump said, "the overwhelming amount of violent crime in our cities is committed by blacks and Hispanics," that "there's killings on an hourly basis virtually in places like Baltimore and Chicago and many other places," that "There are places in America that are among the most dangerous in the world. You go to places like Oakland. Or Ferguson. The crime numbers are worse. Seriously," and retweeted a false claim that 81% of white murder victims were killed by Black people (the actual percentage was 15%, according to the FBI for 2014).

During the campaign Trump was found to have retweeted the main influencers of the #WhiteGenocide movement over 75 times, including twice that he retweeted a user with the handle @WhiteGenocideTM. Trump also falsely claimed that, "African American communities are absolutely in the worst shape they've ever been in before. Ever, ever, ever," that "You go into the inner cities and you see it's 45 percent poverty, African Americans now 45 percent poverty in the inner cities," and that "African Americans and Hispanics are living in hell. You walk down the street and you get shot."

Other claims were directed towards President Barack Obama. Trump blamed Obama for the 2014 Ferguson unrest with "President Obama has absolutely no control (or respect) over the African American community" as well as the 2015 Baltimore riots in "Our great African American President hasn't exactly had a positive impact on the thugs who are so happily and openly destroying Baltimore!" Trump also made unsourced claims stating that Obama "wasn't a very good student" who needed some sort of ambiguous help to get into college, suggested that Obama may not have attended courses, repeated on several occasions the conspiracy theory that Obama had Bill Ayers write his book for him, and stated, "Sadly, because president Obama has done such a poor job as president, you won't see another Black president for generations!" Trump claimed that Russian President Vladimir Putin used "the N-word" to describe Obama, stating that this showed that Putin has no respect for Obama and that Trump himself would do a better job in such a position.

Trump also suggested that evangelicals should not trust Ted Cruz because Cruz is Cuban and that Jeb Bush "has to like the Mexican illegals because of his wife," who is Mexican American.

=== Minority outreach during 2016 campaign ===
Trump's popularity among Hispanic and Latino Americans was low according to polling data; a nationwide survey conducted in February 2016 showed that some 80 percent of Hispanic voters had an unfavorable view of Trump (including 70 percent who had a "very unfavorable" view), more than double the percentage of any other Republican candidate. These low rankings were attributed to Trump campaigning in support of a proposed Mexican border wall and his rhetoric against illegal immigration. Despite expectations of low Latino support, Trump received about 29% of the Hispanic vote, slightly more than Romney received in 2012.

According to polling data during the 2016 U.S. presidential election, Trump was receiving little support from African Americans. In a Morning Consult poll in August 2016, only 5% of Black voters said they intended to vote for Trump. However, Trump ended up receiving 8% of the African-American vote (about 500,000 more votes than Mitt Romney received in 2012). Speaking in Virginia in August 2016, Trump said, "You're living in your poverty, your schools are no good, you have no jobs, 58 percent of your youth is unemployed—what the hell do you have to lose by trying something new, like Trump?"

In June 2016, at a rally in Redding, California, Trump pointed to a man in the audience—Gregory Cheadle, a real estate broker—and said, "Look at my African American over here. Look at him. Are you the greatest?" Cheadle later declared in 2019 that he was so unhappy with Trump's "white superiority complex" and the "pro-white" Republican Party's usage of Blacks as "political pawns" that he was leaving the Republican Party. Cheadle also said "we just haven't had people called the names publicly that we have had with this administration."

== First presidency ==
=== Immigration policy ===
'Trump Immigration Order Sparks Protests at NY Airport' report from Voice of America

On January 27, 2017, via executive order, which he titled Protecting the Nation from Foreign Terrorist Entry into the US, Trump ordered the border indefinitely closed to Syrian refugees fleeing the civil war. He abruptly temporarily halted (for 90 days) immigration from six other Muslim-majority nations: Iraq, Iran, Libya, Somalia, Sudan and Yemen. Human rights activists described these actions as government-approved religious persecution. The order was stayed by Federal courts. Trump would go on to issue revised versions of the ban in March and September 2017. The Supreme Court eventually upheld the third version in June 2018, with Chief Justice Roberts writing for the majority that "The Proclamation is expressly premised on legitimate purposes: preventing entry of nationals who cannot be adequately vetted and inducing other nations to improve their practices". However, dissenting, Justice Sonia Sotomayor compared the opinion to one made in 1944 which allowed the internment of Japanese Americans during World War II. Moustafa Bayoumi criticised the Court for upholding the Executive Order, commenting, "The Muslim ban ruling legitimates Trump's bigotry [...] and the racist view that Muslims are a unique national security threat because they are Muslims persists.

=== Black Caucus ===
In a 2017 press conference, April Ryan asked Trump if he would involve the Congressional Black Caucus when making plans for executive orders affecting inner city areas. Trump replied, "Well, I would. I tell you what. Do you want to set up the meeting?" When Ryan said she was just a reporter, Trump pursued, "Are they friends of yours?" The New York Times wrote that Trump was "apparently oblivious to the racial undertones of posing such a query to a Black journalist". Journalist Jonathan Capehart commented, "Does he think that all Black people know each other and she's going to go run off and set up a meeting for him?"

In March 2017, six members of the Congressional Black Caucus met with Trump to discuss the caucus's reply to Trump's campaign-rally question to African Americans, "What do you have to lose?" (by voting for him). The question was part of Trump's campaign rhetoric that was seen as characterizing all African Americans in terms of helpless poverty and inner-city violence. According to two people who attended the meeting, Trump asked caucus members if they personally knew new cabinet member Ben Carson and appeared surprised when no one said they knew him. Also, when a caucus member told Trump that cuts to welfare programs would hurt her constituents, "not all of whom are Black", the president replied, "Really? Then what are they?", although most welfare recipients are white. The caucus chairman, Rep. Cedric Richmond, later said the meeting was productive and that the goals of the caucus and the administration were more similar than different: "The route to get there is where you may see differences. Part of that is just education and life experiences."

=== Derogatory statements towards Haiti and Nigeria ===
In June 2017, Trump called together a staff meeting to complain about the number of immigrants who had entered the country since his inauguration. The New York Times reported that two officials at the meeting state that when Trump read off a sheet stating that 15,000 persons had visited from Haiti, he commented, "They all have AIDS," and when reading that 40,000 persons had visited from Nigeria, he said that after seeing America the Nigerians would never "go back to their huts." Both officials who heard Trump's statements relayed them to other staff members at the time, but the White House denied that Trump used those words and some officials present claim not to remember them being used.

=== Hurricane Maria ===
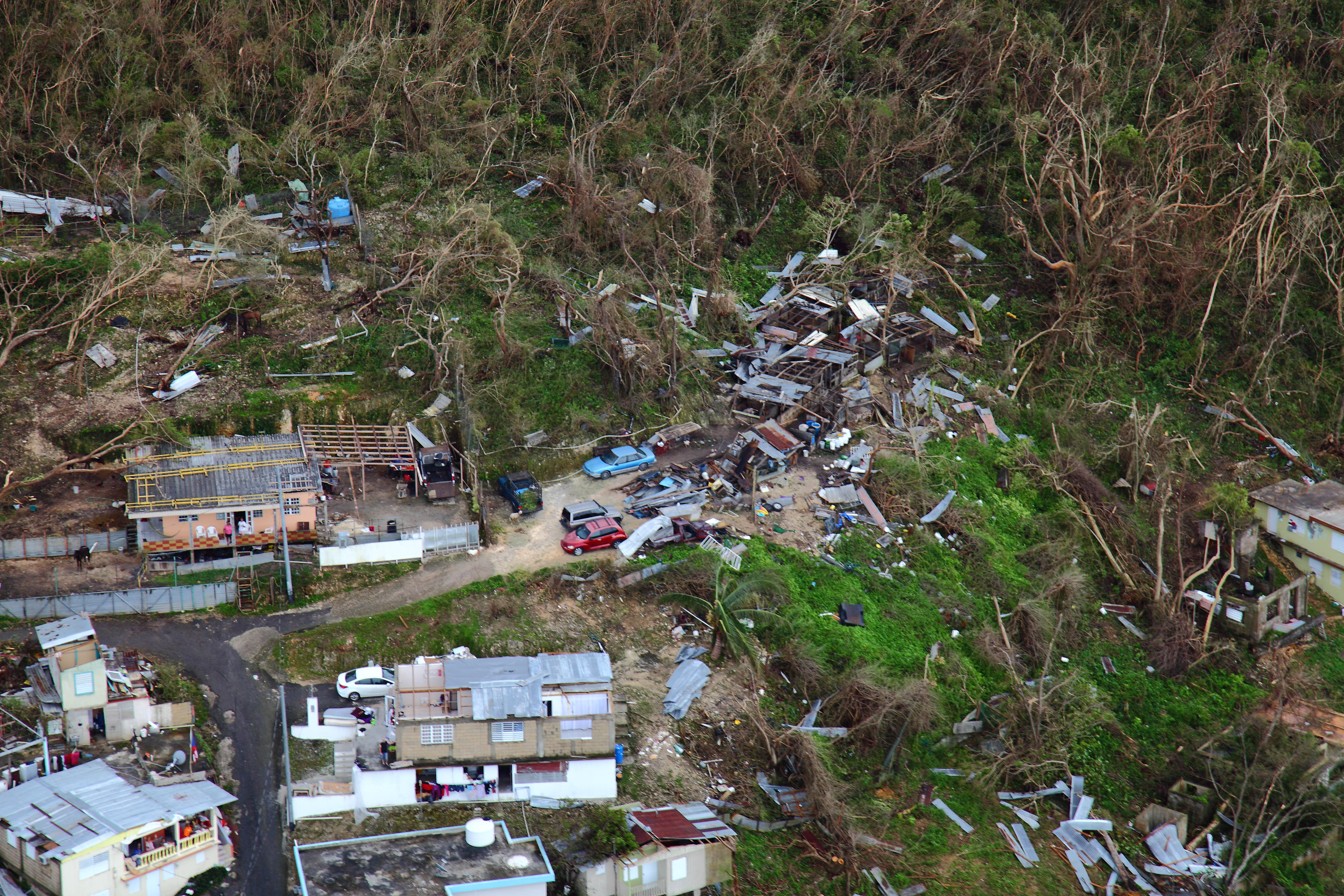
Homes damaged in Puerto Rico following Hurricane Maria

In 2017 after Hurricane Maria struck Puerto Rico, the Mayor of San Juan Carmen Yulín Cruz went on television to plea for help and accused the federal response of fatal inefficiency. Trump responded with tweets claiming the Puerto Rican leadership were "not able to get their workers to help" because "They want everything to be done for them" while claiming federal workers were doing a "fantastic job." As the death toll reached into the thousands, Governor Andrew Cuomo of New York and others criticized the federal government and suggested racism was partially to blame for the insufficient response.

=== Pardon of Joe Arpaio ===
The U.S. Department of Justice concluded that Arizona sheriff Joe Arpaio oversaw the worst pattern of racial profiling in U.S. history. The illegal tactics that he was using included "extreme racial profiling and sadistic punishments that involved the torture, humiliation, and degradation of Latino inmates". The DoJ filed suit against him for unlawful discriminatory police conduct. He ignored their orders and was convicted of contempt of court for continuing to racially profile Hispanics. Calling him "a great American patriot", Trump pardoned him, even before sentencing took place. House speaker Paul Ryan, and Arizona senators, John McCain and Jeff Flake, were critical of Trump's decision. Constitutional scholars opposed the pardon, as "an assault on the federal judiciary, the constitution and the rule of law itself". The American Civil Liberties Union, which was involved in the case resulting in Arpaio's conviction, tweeted: "By pardoning Joe Arpaio, Donald Trump has sent another disturbing signal to an emboldened white nationalist movement that this White House supports racism and bigotry." According to ACLU deputy legal director Cecilia Wang, the pardon was "a presidential endorsement of racism".

=== NFL national anthem protests ===
In August 2016 Colin Kaepernick, an NFL quarterback, began sitting (later kneeling) during the playing of the U.S. national anthem as a protest of police brutality and racial inequality suffered by Black Americans. Then-candidate Trump stated, "I think it's personally not a good thing, I think it's a terrible thing. And, you know, maybe he should find a country that works better for him. Let him try, it won't happen."

Trump commented extensively on the protests during a rally for Alabama Senate candidate Luther Strange, stating, "Wouldn't you love to see one of these NFL owners, when somebody disrespects our flag, to say, 'Get that son of a bitch off the field right now, out, he's fired. He's fired.' You know, some owner is going to do that. He's going to say, 'That guy that disrespects our flag, he's fired.' And that owner, they don't know it they'll be the most popular person in this country. Because that's a total disrespect of our heritage." Trump later pushed back against players' concerns regarding racial inequality stating, "The issue of kneeling has nothing to do with race. It is about respect for our Country, Flag and National Anthem. NFL must respect this!" Trump had Vice President Mike Pence attend an NFL game in Indianapolis, telling him "to leave stadium if any players kneeled, disrespecting our country." Pence left after the anthem, an action that was seen by many as a publicity stunt. Trump's public criticisms of the player protests continued.

In October 2017 Trump publicly praised Dallas Cowboys's owner Jerry Jones after he announced he would bench players who failed to stand during the anthem. Kaepernick filed a collusion case against the NFL, charging that NFL owners, under the influence of Trump, had colluded to agree not to hire Kaepernick as punishment. In a player-owner meeting several owners expressed reluctance to continue allowing players to protest as they feared Trump. New England Patriots owner Robert Kraft, a public supporter of Trump, stated "The problem we have is, we have a president who will use that as fodder to do his mission that I don't feel is in the best interests of America. It's divisive and it's horrible." Kaepernick lawyer Mark Geragos stated, "They were clearly colluding because they were intimidated by the president. The only reason—and the owners will admit this—that they haven't signed him is because of Trump, and they've colluded because of Trump." Miami Dolphins owner Stephen Ross admitted he had originally supported the players' protest but changed his position due to Trump, and other owners testified that Trump had contacted them regarding the protests. Trump praised NFL owners when they voted to allow protesters to be penalized or dismissed for their actions, taking the occasion to suggest that players who didn't want to stand for the anthem didn't belong in the country. Several commentators saw this move by the NFL as a decision to stand with Trump and against the Black protesters.

In June 2018 Trump dis-invited the Super Bowl Champion Philadelphia Eagles from their White House visit after finding that only a minority of players were planning on attending due to their disagreement with Trump's policies. Trump claimed that the players' motivation for not coming was his insistence on standing during the anthem, a claim that was refuted by several Eagles players, as in fact none of the players on that team had knelt during that season. Commentators noted that Trump's redirection of the issue towards the anthem controversy was an attempt to play on social and racial issues in order to fire up his base and have connected it to his public criticisms of Black NBA players, Black UCLA basketball players, and a Black anchor on ESPN.

=== Charlottesville rally ===
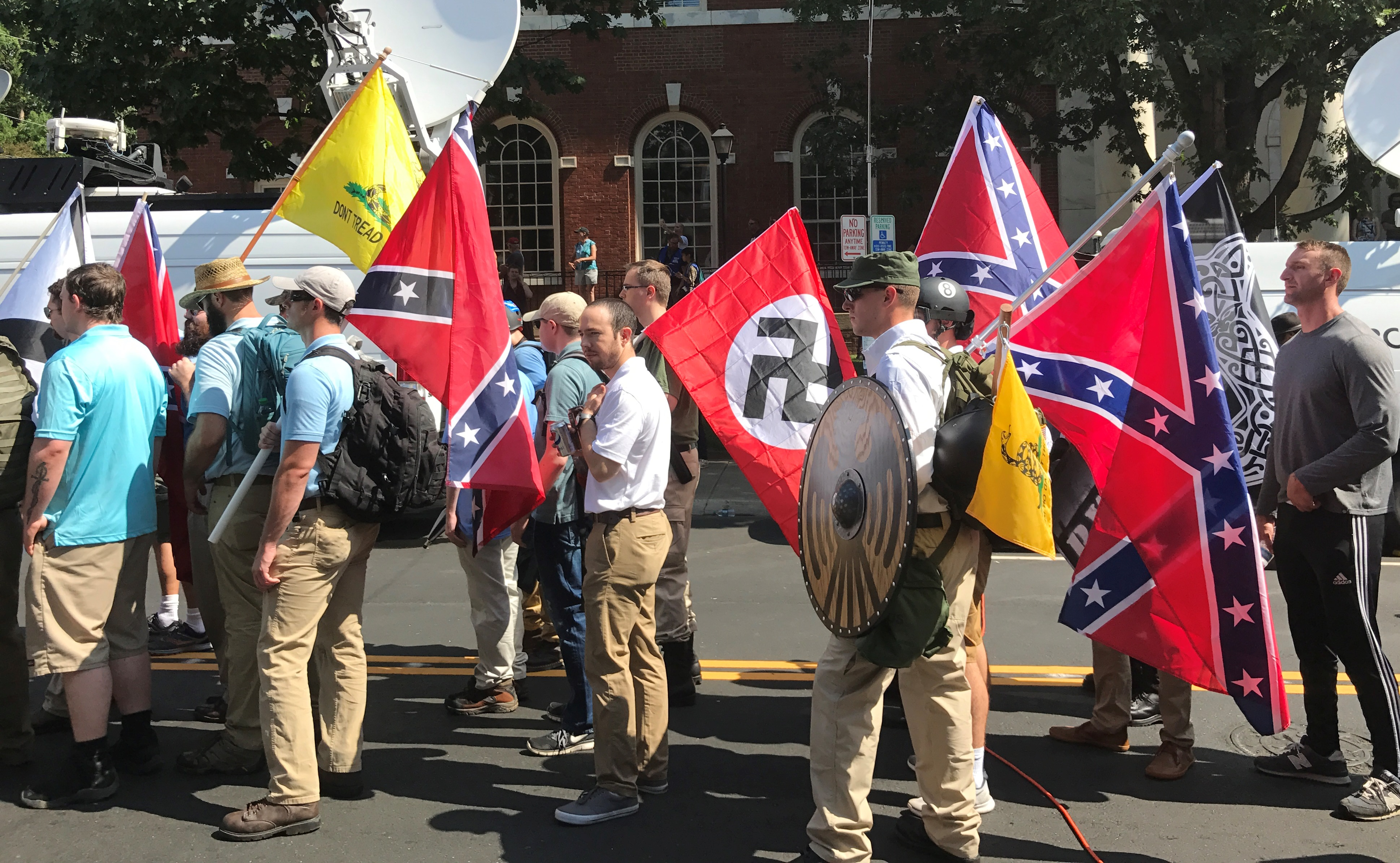
Protesters at the Unite the Right rally. Trump was criticized for saying there were "very fine people on both sides" of the event.

Trump states "We condemn in the strongest possible terms this egregious display of hatred, bigotry and violence on many sides, on many sides."

A far-right rally called "Unite the Right" was held in Charlottesville, Virginia, on August 11–12, 2017. Its stated goal was to oppose the removal of a statue of Robert E. Lee from Emancipation Park. Protesters included white supremacists, white nationalists, neo-Confederates, Klansmen, neo-Nazis, and various militias. Some chanted racist and antisemitic slogans, and carried Nazi flags, Confederate battle flags, anti-Muslim and antisemitic banners, and semi-automatic rifles. Some of the protesters and counterprotesters carried shields and sticks, and both groups were "swinging sticks, punching and spraying chemicals", forcing police to declare unlawful assembly and disperse the crowds. Two hours after the dispersal order, a woman was killed and 35 other people injured at a nearby mall, when a self-professed neo-Nazi drove his car into a group of people who had been protesting against the rally.

In his initial statement on the rally, Trump condemned "hatred, bigotry, and violence on many sides" but did not directly denounce white nationalists. His statement and his subsequent defenses of it, in which he also referred to "very fine people on both sides", suggested a moral equivalence between the white supremacist marchers and those who protested against them, leading some observers to state that he was sympathetic to white supremacy. Trump said in the same defense: "I'm not talking about the neo-Nazis and the white nationalists, because they should be condemned totally".

Two days later, following a wave of disapproval that met his initial remarks, Trump delivered a prepared statement, saying "Racism is evil, and those who cause violence in its name are criminals and thugs." However, the next day he defended the original rally, stating, "You had people in that group who were protesting the taking down of what to them is a very, very important statue...You're changing history; you're changing culture," and again placed blame on the counterprotesters in affirming, "I think there's blame on both sides. And I have no doubt about it. You had a group on one side that was bad and you had a group on the other side that was also very violent. No one wants to say that, but I'll say it right now: You had a group on the other side that came charging in without a permit and they were very, very violent." Former KKK Grand Wizard David Duke praised Trump's remarks in a tweet: "Thank you President Trump for your honesty & courage to tell the truth about #Charlottesville & condemn the leftist terrorists in BLM/Antifa."

Five days after the rally, Trump returned to Twitter to express sympathy with the original rally and their defense of Confederate statues, writing, "Sad to see the history and culture of our great country being ripped apart with the removal of our beautiful statues and monuments" and "the beauty that is being taken out of our cities, towns and parks will be greatly missed and never able to be comparably replaced!"

Ten days after the rally, in prepared remarks at an American Legion conference, Trump called for the country to unite. He said: "We are not defined by the color of our skin, the figure on our paycheck or the party of our politics. Rather, we are defined by our shared humanity, our citizenship in this magnificent nation and by the love that fills our hearts." The remarks came a day after further racially divisive remarks he had made at a rally in Phoenix, Arizona, where he had said of those who wish to take down Confederate statues, "They're trying to take away our culture. They're trying to take away our history."

In a tweet to mark the first anniversary, Trump stated "The riots in Charlottesville a year ago resulted in senseless death and division. We must come together as a nation. I condemn all types of racism and acts of violence. Peace to ALL Americans!" Critics contended that the wording "all types of racism" could be seen as a veiled defense of white nationalists, similarly to his "both sides" remarks on the rally.

=== Elizabeth Warren ===
In her 2012 campaign for the Senate, Elizabeth Warren's opponent raised accusations concerning Warren's having listed partial Native American ancestry on her profile in a professional directory. Warren denies that she ever claimed to be a minority for the purpose of securing employment, and a review of her employment history and interviews of her past employers has been unable to find anything that supports the charge. Picking up on the controversy, Trump has frequently referred to her as "Pocahontas", including at a White House event where he addressed Native American veterans who served in the US military during World War II. Warren responded: "It was deeply unfortunate that the President of the United States cannot even make it through a ceremony honoring these heroes without throwing out a racial slur."

The general secretary of the Alliance of Colonial Era Tribes, John Norwood, said Trump's nickname for Warren is "insulting to all American Indians" and "smacks of racism", adding that Trump should "stop using our historical people of significance as a racial slur against one of his opponents." The president of the National Congress of American Indians said: "We regret that the president's use of the name Pocahontas as a slur to insult a political adversary is overshadowing the true purpose of today's White House ceremony." White House press secretary Sarah Huckabee Sanders said that complaints that the nickname is a racial slur are "ridiculous", and that "What most people find offensive is Senator Warren lying about her heritage to advance her career."

=== "Pretty Korean lady" ===
On January 12, 2018, after an intelligence briefing on hostages held by a terrorist group in Pakistan, Trump asked an Asian-American intelligence analyst "Where are you from?" After she told him she was from New York (state), he asked again, and she clarified that she was from Manhattan. He pressed with the question until she finally told him that her parents were Korean. Trump then asked one of his advisers why "the pretty Korean lady" was not negotiating for him with North Korea.

NBC News characterized this exchange as Trump having "seemed to suggest her ethnicity should determine her career path". Vox suggested that when Trump refused to accept New York as an answer he is "saying that children of Asian immigrants can never truly be 'from' America. This isn't just simple bigotry; it feels like a rejection of the classic American 'melting pot' ideal altogether."

=== "Shithole countries" ===
On January 11, 2018, during an Oval Office meeting about immigration reform, commenting on immigration figures from El Salvador, Haiti, Honduras, and African countries, Trump reportedly said: "Those shitholes send us the people that they don't want", and suggested that the US should instead increase immigration from "places like Norway" and Asian countries. The comments received widespread domestic and international condemnation; news anchors such as Anderson Cooper and Don Lemon called Trump a racist.

In a statement issued the same day, the White House did not deny that the president made the remarks, but on the following day Trump did tweet out a partial denial, saying that he "never said anything derogatory about Haitians", and denied using "shithole" specifically to refer to those countries but did admit to using "tough language". Senate minority whip Dick Durbin, the only Democrat present at the Oval Office meeting, stated that Trump did use racist language and referred to African countries as "shitholes" and that "he said these hate-filled things, and he said them repeatedly."

Speaking on PBS NewsHour, Mark Shields commented, "It's one thing when Donald Trump uses Pocahontas to attack or taunt one senator, Elizabeth Warren. This, quite frankly, is beyond that. I mean, this is racial. It's racist. It is."

In March 2019, Homeland Security secretary Kirstjen Nielsen testified about border security to the House Homeland Security Committee, where she was asked about the incident. She said she did not "specifically remember a categorization of countries from Africa." Asked about the president's language, Nielsen said, "I don't remember specific words", while remembering "the general profanity that was used in the room by almost everyone" but not Dick Durbin. Later on during the questioning, Nielsen said, "I remember specific cuss words being used by a variety of members," without elaborating on what was said or by whom.

Republican senators Tom Cotton of Arkansas and David Perdue of Georgia, also present at the meeting, initially issued a joint statement stating that they "do not recall the President saying those comments specifically". Later, both senators denied that Trump had said "shithole". Perdue said Trump "did not use that word ... The gross misrepresentation was that language was used in there that was not used," and Cotton said, "I didn't hear it, and I was sitting no further away from Donald Trump than Dick Durbin". Cotton elaborated that he "did not hear derogatory comments about individuals or persons", and went on to affirm with the interviewer that the "sentiment [attributed to Trump] is totally phony". Meanwhile, The Washington Post reported that Cotton and Perdue told the White House they heard "shithouse" rather than "shithole".

Senator Tim Scott (R-SC) stated that Senator Lindsey Graham (R-SC), present at the meeting, had confirmed that Trump indeed called El Salvador, Haiti and some African nations "shithole countries". Graham refused to confirm or deny hearing Trump's words, but rather released a statement in which he said, "[I] said my piece directly to [Trump]." In what was interpreted as a response to Cotton and Purdue, Graham later said, "My memory hasn't evolved. I know what was said and I know what I said," while also asserting "It's not where you come from that matters, it's what you're willing to do once you get here." Senator Jeff Flake (R-AZ) said that the meeting participants had told him about Trump making those remarks before the account went public.

Conservative columnist Erick Erickson said Trump had privately bragged to friends about making the remarks, thinking "it would play well with the base." The Washington Post quoted Trump's aides as saying Trump had called friends to ask how his political supporters would react to the coverage of the incident, and that he was "not particularly upset" by its publication.

In Dcecember 2025, Trump reprised this comment in a speech in Pennsylvania, wherein he confirmed his "shithole" comments in the 2018 meeting and repeated the claim that Somalia is a "hellhole" country and that America should request more immigrants from the Nordic countries of Norway, Sweden, and Denmark.

In October 2026, Trump said "Norway has become a shit house country, actually" and that he did not want immigration from the country "because I didn't get the Nobel Prize ... So I don't want anybody from Norway".

==== Response from Republicans ====
Vice President Mike Pence claimed that he "knows the president's heart", and that Trump's goal is to reform the immigration system so that it is merit-based regardless of race, creed or country of origin, encouraging immigration by those who want to "contribute to a growing American economy and thriving communities." Some Republican lawmakers denounced Trump's comments, calling them "unfortunate" and "indefensible", while others sidestepped or did not respond to them. House speaker Paul Ryan said, "So, first thing that came to my mind was very unfortunate, unhelpful." Senator Susan Collins of Maine, who said she would not vote for Trump and has been very critical of him, said: "These comments are highly inappropriate and out of bounds and could hurt efforts for a bipartisan immigration agreement. The president should not denigrate other countries." Senator Tim Scott of South Carolina, the only African-American Republican in the Senate, and Senator James Lankford of Oklahoma, called the comments "disappointing".

Representative Mia Love of Utah, who is of Haitian descent, tweeted that the comments were "unkind, divisive, elitist, and fly in the face of our nation's values". She later stated they were "really difficult to hear, especially because my [Haitian immigrant] parents were such big supporters of the president.... there are countries that struggle out there but ... their people are good people and they're part of us." Senator Jeff Flake of Arizona wrote "The words used by the President, as related to me directly following the meeting by those in attendance were not 'tough', they were abhorrent and repulsive." Representatives Ileana Ros-Lehtinen of Florida and Erik Paulsen of Minnesota also denounced the comments.

==== Response from Democrats ====
When asked if he believed Senator Durbin's reporting of the incident, Senate Minority Leader Chuck Schumer replied, "I have no doubts. First, Donald Trump has lied so many times, it's hard to believe him on anything, let alone this." Both House minority whip Steny Hoyer of Maryland and civil rights leader Representative John Lewis of Georgia said Trump's remarks confirm his racism. Representative Jim McGovern of Massachusetts said, "America's president is a racist and this is the proof. His hateful rhetoric has no place in the White House." Representative Tim Walz of Minnesota said, "This is racism, plain and simple, and we need to call it that. My Republican colleagues need to call it that too." Senator Richard Blumenthal of Connecticut said that Trump's comments "smack of blatant racism—odious and insidious racism masquerading poorly as immigration policy". Representative Karen Bass of California said: "You would never call a predominantly white country a 'shithole' because you are unable to see people of color, American or otherwise, as equals." Representative Bill Pascrell of New Jersey tweeted that Trump is "showing his bigoted tendencies in ways that would make Archie Bunker blush", and called him a "national disgrace".

==== International response ====
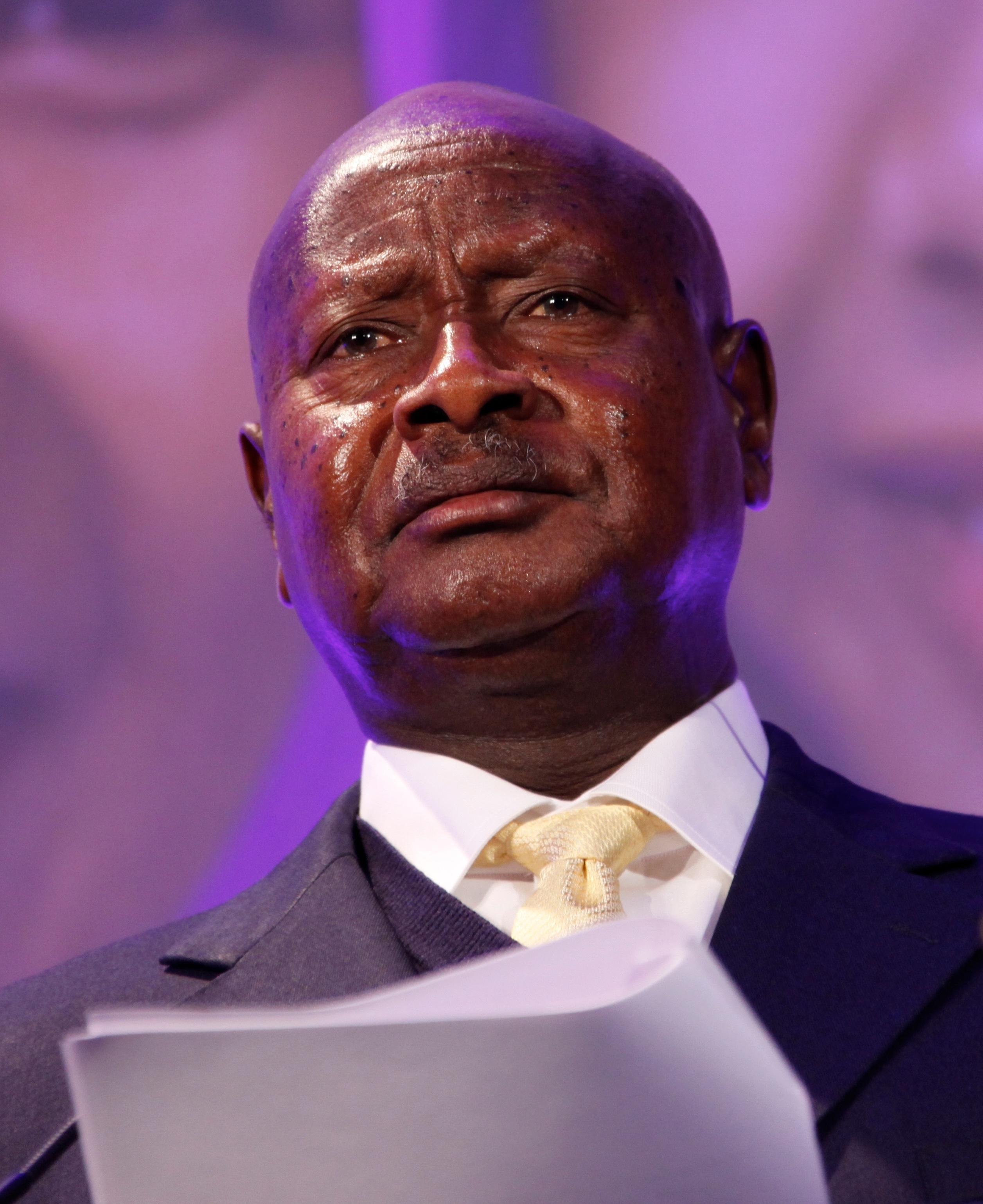
After the supposed "shithole countries" remark, Ugandan president Yoweri Museveni praised Trump saying "I love Trump because he talks to Africans frankly."

Rupert Colville, a spokesman for the United Nations Office of the High Commissioner for Human Rights, said at a news briefing, "There is no other word one can use but racist. You cannot dismiss entire countries and continents as 'shitholes', whose entire populations, who are not white, are therefore not welcome."

The African Union issued a statement strongly condemning the remarks and demanding a retraction and apology; an AU spokeswoman said, "Given the historical reality of how many Africans arrived in the United States as slaves, [Trump's statement] flies in the face of all accepted behavior and practice. This is particularly surprising as the United States of America remains a global example of how migration gave birth to a nation built on strong values of diversity and opportunity."

The president of Uganda Yoweri Museveni praised Trump saying "I love Trump because he talks to Africans frankly. I don't know if he's misquoted or whatever, but when he speaks I like him because he speaks frankly."

The Ministry of International Affairs of Botswana summoned the US ambassador, and said in a statement "We view the utterances by the current American President as highly irresponsible, reprehensible, and racist." The African National Congress, the ruling party in South Africa, tweeted "its offensive for President Trump to make derogatory statements about countries that do not share policy positions with the US. Developing countries experience difficulties. The US also faces difficulties." Mmusi Maimane, the leader of South Africa's opposition party the Democratic Alliance, said "The hatred of Obama's roots now extends to an entire continent."

Haitian ambassador to the United States Paul Altidor said Haiti "vehemently condemn[ed]" Trump's comments, saying they were "based on stereotypes". Haiti's former prime minister Laurent Lamothe said, "It shows a lack of respect and ignorance never seen before in the recent history of the US by any President."

=== "The Snake" song and story ===
Starting with his presidential run in 2016, Trump has often told the story of "The Snake", inspired by the song written by Oscar Brown Jr. In Trump's retelling, the story becomes an allegory used to warn of the danger posed by immigrants. In February 2018, Trump faced criticism after including the story during a speech to the Conservative Political Action Conference. Maggie Brown, daughter of Oscar Brown Jr., stated that Trump's immigration agenda "deals with separatism, racism, sexism, and it's kind of thing that's polar opposite to what Oscar Brown Jr was about." Lincoln Project co-founder Steve Schmidt said "Trump's snake story is vicious, disgraceful, utterly racist and profoundly un-American." Austrian language researcher Kateryna Pilyarchuk claims that "Trump has used 'The Snake' to whip up racist fervor at raucous rallies."

=== Retweeting anti-Muslim videos ===
In November 2017, Trump retweeted without comment three anti-Muslim videos captioned as showing Muslims committing violence. The videos were originally posted by Jayda Fransen, deputy leader of the far-right group Britain First, who had been convicted in 2016 of religiously aggravated harassment against a Muslim woman. A spokesman for British prime minister Theresa May said it was "wrong" for Trump to share the videos and that "Britain First seeks to divide communities through their use of hateful narratives which peddle lies and stoke tensions".

=== Alice Marie Johnson ===
Alice Marie Johnson is an African-American woman who was given a life sentence in 1996 after being convicted on charges of conspiracy to possess cocaine and attempted possession of cocaine. In June 2018, Trump granted her clemency a week after meeting with Kim Kardashian, who was lobbying for her release. In August 2020, Johnson appeared in a video broadcast to the Republican National Convention telling of her release and praising Trump's decision to sign a criminal justice reform bill, the First Step Act, into law. The next day, President Trump granted her a full pardon. Commentators have pointed out that most of the people Trump has given clemency to did not "look like Johnson" and that he has used the pardon power mainly for political purposes.

=== Affirmative action in schools ===
In July 2018, the Trump administration eliminated Obama-era guidelines suggesting that universities consider race for student admissions decisions. The Obama administration had wanted to cultivate a more diverse student body on university campuses, but the Trump administration viewed the guidelines as unconstitutional.

=== Immigrants in Europe ===
In July 2018, while on a trip to Europe, Trump said in an interview with The Sun newspaper that "I think allowing millions and millions of people to come into Europe is very, very sad, I think what has happened to Europe is a shame. I think it changed the fabric of Europe and, unless you act very quickly, it's never going to be what it was and I don't mean that in a positive way, I think you are losing your culture. Look around. You go through certain areas that didn't exist ten or 15 years ago," On the same trip, during a joint press conference with Prime Minister Theresa May, Trump again commented on immigration in Europe: "I think it's been very bad for Europe. I think Europe is a place I know very well and I think what has happened is very tough. It's a very tough situation, I just think it's changing the culture. It's a very negative thing for Europe." May responded by saying that "Over the years, overall immigration has been good for the UK. It brought people with different backgrounds and outlooks here to the UK and we've seen them contributing to our society and economy."

=== White farmers in South Africa ===
In August 2018, Trump sent a tweet stating that he had ordered Secretary of State Mike Pompeo to look into land seizures and the mass killing of white farmers in South Africa, acting on a racist conspiracy theory. In fact, farming organisation AgriSA had recently reported that the murder rate on farms had declined to the lowest level in 20 years, one-third of the level recorded in 1998. In response, the Anti-Defamation League issued a statement:

It is extremely disturbing that the President of the United States echoed a long-standing and false white supremacist claim that South Africa's white farmers are targets of large-scale, racially-motivated killings by South Africa's Black majority. We would hope that the President would try to understand the facts and realities of the situation in South Africa, rather than repeat disturbing, racially divisive talking points used most frequently by white supremacists.

=== "I am a nationalist" ===
At a rally in Houston in October 2018, Trump stated "You know, they have a word—it's sort of became old-fashioned—it's called a nationalist. And I say, really, we're not supposed to use that word. You know what I am? I'm a nationalist, okay? I'm a nationalist. Nationalist. Nothing wrong. Use that word. Use that word." Trump later denied that there was any racial connotation connected to his use of the word. Many others, however, suggested that his use of the word "nationalist" was dangerously close to the phrase "white nationalist". Reformed neo-Nazi Christian Picciolini, for example, tweeted that "Trump's 'I'm a Nationalist' comment will likely represent the biggest boon for white supremacist recruitment since the film The Birth of a Nation glorified the Klan in 1915 and gained the KKK 4 million members by 1925."

=== Trump-backed ad removed ===
In November 2018, Facebook, NBC, and Fox News withdrew a controversial political campaign ad which was backed by Trump after critics described it as racist. Shown prior to the midterm elections, the ad focused on a migrant caravan then traveling through Mexico with hopes of immigration to the U.S., and Luis Bracamontes, an undocumented immigrant who was convicted of killing two sheriff's deputies in California in 2014.

=== 'Only in the Panhandle' ===
In May 2019, during a Trump campaign rally, an audience member suggested shooting illegal migrants crossing the border, to which Trump responded with a joke, saying, "only in the Panhandle you can get away with that".

=== Harriet Tubman on the twenty-dollar bill ===
In May 2019, the Trump administration announced that the plan to replace the portrait of Andrew Jackson on the twenty-dollar bill with that of Harriet Tubman by 2020, as had been planned by the Obama administration, would be delayed until 2026. Some critics viewed this decision as a reflection of Trump's racism, including Representative Ayanna Pressley, who said "Secretary Mnuchin has allowed Trump's racism and misogyny to prevent him from carrying out the will of the people." Trump is a great admirer of Andrew Jackson and had his portrait installed in the Oval Office immediately after moving into the White House. Critics have suggested that Trump's support of Jackson is "barely veiled racism" as an attempt to appeal to his largely white political base, and point to Jackson's ownership of slaves and policies towards Native Americans.

=== Democratic congresswomen should "go back" to their countries ===
On July 14, 2019, Trump tweeted about four Democratic congresswomen, and although he did not mention any member of Congress by name, it was widely inferred that he was referring to Alexandria Ocasio-Cortez, Ayanna Pressley, Ilhan Omar, and Rashida Tlaib. This group, known collectively as the Squad, had verbally sparred with Speaker of the House Nancy Pelosi a week earlier:

So interesting to see "Progressive" Democrat Congresswomen, who originally came from countries whose governments are a complete and total catastrophe, the worst, most corrupt and inept anywhere in the world (if they even have a functioning government at all), now loudly and viciously telling the people of the United States, the greatest and most powerful Nation on earth, how our government is to be run. Why don't they go back and help fix the totally broken and crime infested places from which they came. Then come back and show us how it is done. These places need your help badly, you can't leave fast enough. I'm sure that Nancy Pelosi would be very happy to quickly work out free travel arrangements!

— Donald J. Trump (@realDonaldTrump on Twitter, July 14, 2019)

The U.S. Equal Employment Opportunity Commission (EEOC) specifically cites the phrase "Go back to where you came from" as the type of language that may violate anti-discrimination employment laws. "Ethnic slurs and other verbal or physical conduct because of nationality are illegal if they are severe or pervasive and create an intimidating, hostile or offensive working environment, interfere with work performance, or negatively affect job opportunities." The EEOC's website states: "Examples of potentially unlawful conduct include insults, taunting, or ethnic epithets, such as making fun of a person's foreign accent or comments like, 'Go back to where you came from,' whether made by supervisors or by co-workers."

Only one of those congresswomen is an immigrant; the other three were born in the United States, making Trump's comments an example of the false attribution of foreignness to members of minorities. Pelosi labelled Trump's comments as "xenophobic" and commented: "When @realDonaldTrump tells four American congresswomen to go back to their countries, he reaffirms his plan to 'Make America Great Again' has always been about making America white again." Among the 2020 presidential candidates, Bernie Sanders said Trump was a racist, while Elizabeth Warren, Kamala Harris, and Beto O'Rourke called his statements racist. Justin Amash, a U.S. Representative who had recently left the Republican Party, called the statements "racist and disgusting". Republican lawmakers were initially mostly silent on Trump's statements, with those in leadership positions at first declining to comment. By July 20, around 20 Republican lawmakers had criticized Trump's statements, around 60 Republican lawmakers either supported Trump or instead criticized Democratic lawmakers, around 60 Republican lawmakers criticized both Trump and Democratic lawmakers, and around 110 were silent or offered vague answers. White nationalist publications and social media sites praised Trump's remarks; "This is the kind of WHITE NATIONALISM we elected him for," wrote Andrew Anglin on his Daily Stormer neo-Nazi website.

New York Times news analyst Peter Baker drew controversy for writing an article on the tweets but avoiding directly calling the tweets "racist". The direct application of the term "racist" is typically controversial and avoided in journalism, with euphemisms such as "racially-charged" or "racially-infused" typically used instead. However, many publications directly called Trump's tweets and language as racist, including The Washington Post, Vox, and CNN, as well as the Associated Press. NPR has had a policy imposed since January 2018 to generally avoid using the word "racist" when describing the Trump administration, but the news room agreed on an editorial decision to describe Trump's tweets as racist.

The Washington Post, after interviews with 26 involved sources, reported that after the backlash, Trump defended his statements to his advisers. Trump said that he had been watching Fox & Friends, that his statements were aimed at bringing more attention to the four congresswomen because he believed they were 'good foils'.

Later on July 14, Trump tweeted: "So sad to see the Democrats sticking up for people who speak so badly of our Country and who, in addition, hate Israel with a true and unbridled passion. Whenever confronted, they call their adversaries, including Nancy Pelosi, 'RACIST.'" The next day, Trump demanded that "the Radical Left Congresswomen" apologize to him, as well as the people of the United States and Israel, for "the terrible things they have said". He also accused them of propagating "racist hatred". In response to a journalist, Trump said he wasn't concerned if white nationalists agreed with him, "because many people agree with me."

On July 16, the House of Representatives rebuked his remarks, passing H.Res. 489 which says the House "strongly condemns President Donald Trump's racist comments that have legitimized and increased fear and hatred of new Americans and people of color." Four Republican representatives (Brian Fitzpatrick, Fred Upton, Will Hurd and Susan Brooks) joined the Democratic majority and independent Justin Amash in a 240-to-187 vote. Before the vote, Trump continued his insults towards the congresswomen and top Republicans accused the four congresswomen of being socialists. After the vote, Trump praised the Republican Party for being unified in rejecting the House resolution, while acknowledging that the resolution was regarding his comments on "four Democrat Congresswomen".

Also on July 16, Republican Senate Majority Leader Mitch McConnell and Republican House Minority Leader Kevin McCarthy commented on Trump's statements. McConnell was asked if Trump's initial statements were racist. McConnell replied: "The president's not a racist." McConnell also said it was a "mistake" to "single out any segment" of widespread "incendiary rhetoric" in American politics. McCarthy was also asked if Trump's initial statements were racist; McCarthy replied: "No." Republican Lindsey Graham, chair of the Senate Committee on the Judiciary, tweeted "We all know that AOC and this crowd are a bunch of communists. They hate Israel. They hate our own country. They're calling the guards along our border—Border Patrol agents—concentration camp guards. They accuse people who support Israel of doing it for the Benjamins. They're anti-Semitic. They're anti-America." On July 18 he said that he did not think Trump's initial statements were racist because: "I don't think a Somali refugee embracing Trump would be asked to go back. If you're racist, you want everybody to go back because they are Black or Muslim." Previously in 2015, Graham had called Trump a "race-baiting, xenophobic religious bigot".

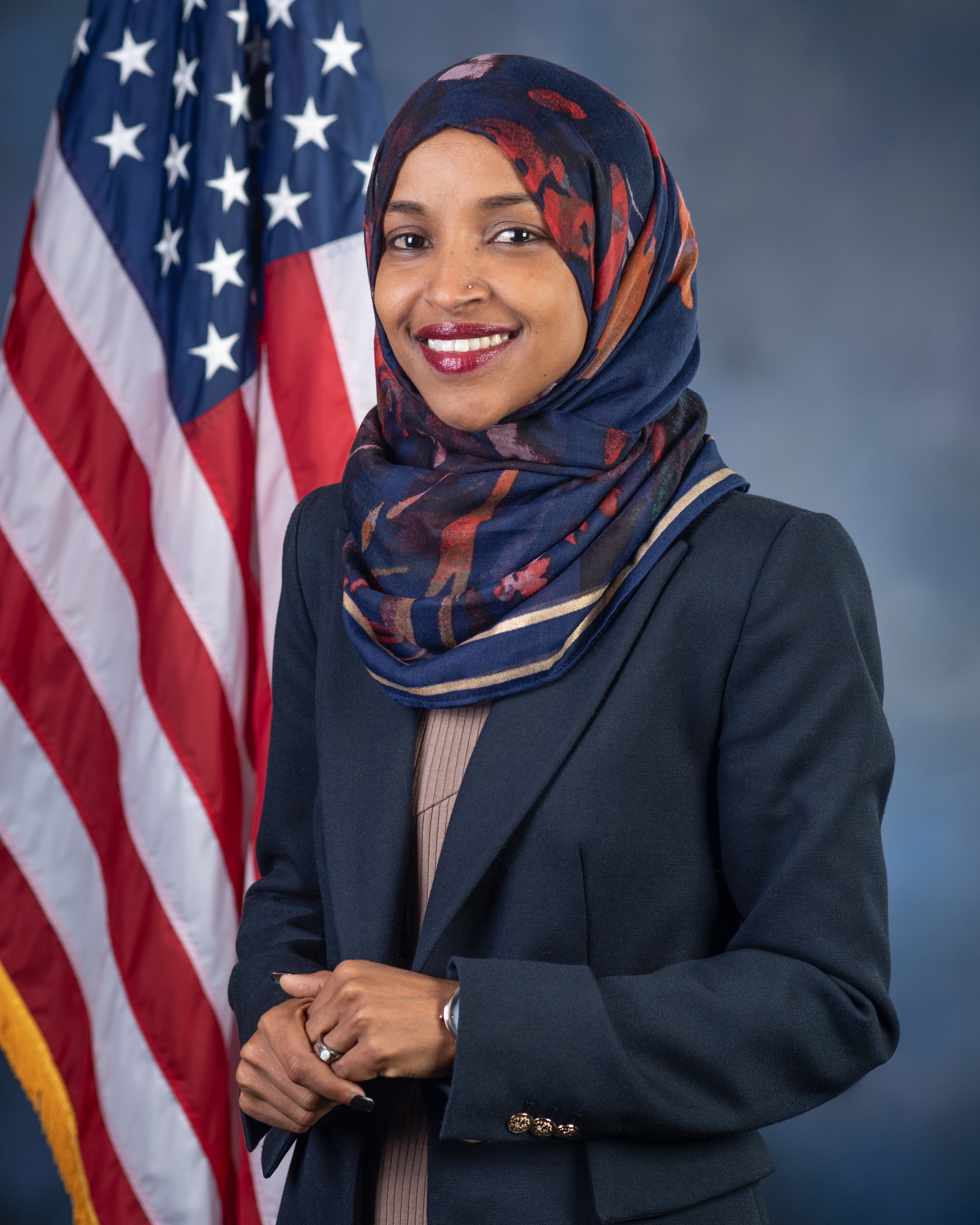
Following his tweets, Trump held a rally and falsely claimed that Representative Ilhan Omar supported al-Qaeda. The crowd at the rally later started chanting "Send her back, Send her back."

At a presidential campaign rally on July 17 in North Carolina, Trump continued to attack the four congresswomen: "They never have anything good to say. That's why I say, 'Hey if you don't like it, let 'em leave' ... if they don't love it, tell them to leave it." "Love it or leave it" is a slogan often directed toward critics of the government or anyone who is perceived as not being sufficiently patriotic, particularly if they are non-white; it was commonly used against Vietnam War protesters in the 1960s. In his speech, Trump referenced Rashida Tlaib calling him a 'motherfucker', stating: "that's not somebody that loves our country". Trump also named Ilhan Omar and misrepresented comments Omar made in 2013, falsely claiming that Omar had praised al-Qaeda. As Trump continued that Omar "looks down with contempt" on Americans, the crowd of Trump supporters reacted by chanting: "Send her back, Send her back." After the rally, Trump tweeted: "What a crowd, and what great people". Asked about the chants on July 18, Trump said he disagreed with the chants from the crowd. He falsely claimed that he tried to stop the chant by "speaking very quickly". In reality, Trump stopped speaking for 13 seconds while the chant was occurring, and did not discourage the crowd. He continued criticizing Omar after resuming his speech. On July 19, Trump praised the North Carolina crowd as "incredible people" and "incredible patriots".

Foreign media has widely covered the incident. The social media hashtag #IStandWithIlhanOmar was soon trending in the United States and other countries. Many foreign politicians commented, condemning Trump. On July 19, German Chancellor Angela Merkel, commented, "I reject [Trump's comments] and stand in solidarity with the congresswomen he targeted." Canadian Prime Minister Justin Trudeau said, "The comments made were hurtful, wrong and completely unacceptable. I want everyone in Canada to know that those comments are completely unacceptable and should not be allowed or encouraged in Canada". British Prime Minister Theresa May also condemned Trump's remarks, calling them "completely unacceptable." Donald Tusk, President of the European Council, commented "I've been, for many years, one of the most pro-American politicians in Europe.... (but) sometimes if you feel that something is totally unacceptable you have to react despite business, despite interests.

In a CBS News and YouGov poll of almost 2,100 American adults conducted from July 17 to 19, it was found that 34% felt that Trump's initial tweets were not racist, and 48% felt that they were racist. 70% of Republican respondents felt that the tweets were not racist. 84% of Democrat respondents felt that the tweets were racist. 59% of respondents disagreed with Trump's initial tweets, while 40% agreed.

=== "Rat and rodent infested mess" ===
On July 27, 2019, Trump used Twitter to criticize Representative Elijah Cummings, the Maryland district he represented, and the city of Baltimore. Cummings, since deceased, was Chairman of the House Oversight Committee, which was heading investigations of the Trump administration, including of its migrant detentions. The district Cummings represented is over 50% Black according to the U.S. Census. It includes parts of Baltimore as well as suburban areas. Trump's tweets came less than an hour after a Fox & Friends segment by Kimberly Klacik criticizing Cummings and his district. Klacik, who is also Black, reacted positively, believing that Trump had watched her segment.

Rep, Elijah Cummings has been a brutal bully, shouting and screaming at the great men & women of Border Patrol about conditions at the Southern Border, when actually his Baltimore district is FAR WORSE and more dangerous. His district is considered the Worst in the USA...... As proven last week during a Congressional tour, the Border is clean, efficient & well run, just very crowded. Cumming District is a disgusting, rat and rodent infested mess. If he spent more time in Baltimore, maybe he could help clean up this very dangerous & filthy place ... Why is so much money sent to the Elijah Cummings district when it is considered the worst run and most dangerous anywhere in the United States. No human being would want to live there. Where is all this money going? How much is stolen? Investigate this corrupt mess immediately!

— Donald J. Trump (@realDonaldTrump on Twitter, July 27, 2019)

According to a Afua Hirsch, a columnist at The Guardian, Trump has a history of describing largely Black populated areas as being "infested", including African nations in 2014, Atlanta in 2017, sanctuary cities in 2018, and the places he decided the "Squad" should "go back" to in 2019. When Representative John Lewis refused to attend Trump's inauguration in 2017, Trump said that Lewis "should spend more time on fixing and helping his district, which is in horrible shape and falling apart (not to mention crime infested)".

Cummings responded that it was his "moral duty to fight for [his] constituents", pointing out that to do so, he had previously asked for Trump's support in passing laws to lower prescription drug prices, while linking to a 2017 article from Democratic representatives lamenting that Trump did not offer support on such issues. Speaker of the House Nancy Pelosi, who was born in Baltimore, and Senator Elizabeth Warren condemned his remarks as racist.

Trump continued his attacks hours later: "Elijah Cummings spends all of his time trying to hurt innocent people through "Oversight." He does NOTHING for his very poor, very dangerous and very badly run district!" Cummings' Maryland district's median income is above the average for American districts.

On July 27, the editorial board of The Baltimore Sun responded to Trump's statements. They argued that Trump also has a responsibility to solve Baltimore's problems, since the White House has more power than any single congressman. They concluded: "Better to have some vermin living in your neighborhood than to be one."

On July 28, Trump wrote "There is nothing racist in stating plainly what most people already know, that Elijah Cummings has done a terrible job for the people of his district, and of Baltimore itself. Dems always play the race card when they are unable to win with facts. Shame!". Trump's Acting chief of staff, Mick Mulvaney, defended the comments in television interviews, saying that he understood why some people think Trump's comments are racist, "but that doesn't mean that it is racist." Trump also called Cummings a "racist", without explanation, and retweeted a tweet from right-wing commentator Katie Hopkins that labelled Baltimore as a "proper sh*thole".

On July 29, Al Sharpton, a Black activist for civil rights, tweeted: "Arrived in DC from Atlanta, headed to Baltimore. Long day but can't stop." Trump quoted and responded to that tweet of Sharpton's, declaring: "I have known Al for 25 years. Went to fights with him & Don King, always got along well. He 'loved Trump!' He would ask me for favors often. Al is a con man, a troublemaker, always looking for a score. Just doing his thing. Must have intimidated Comcast/NBC. Hates Whites & Cops!" This led Sharpton to reply: "I do make trouble for bigots. If he really thought I was a con man he would want me in his cabinet."

On July 30, Trump said that "thousands" of people have told his administration they were "thankful" for his comments on Baltimore, in particular the Black majority of the residents of Baltimore, who he said were "living in hell".

Regarding Trump's rhetoric, the Washington National Cathedral issued a statement from its leaders Mariann Budde, Randolph Hollerith and Kelly Douglas. They condemned Trump's statements as "dangerous", because "violent words lead to violent actions". They asked when would Americans declare that they "have had enough" of Trump's words and actions, which both attract and shield "white supremacists who consider people of color a sub-human 'infestation' in America ... The question is less about the president's sense of decency, but of" Americans'.

=== Mass shooting in Texas ===
Following the mass shooting that took place in El Paso, Texas during the first week of August 2019, Trump's anti-immigrant rhetoric was widely criticized, especially remarks regarding Hispanics and his repeated warnings about an immigrant "invasion", the same wording used by the El Paso shooter in his anti-immigrant manifesto in which he wrote, "this attack is a response to the Hispanic invasion of Texas." Representative Veronica Escobar, whose district includes a large part of the city, said "Words have consequences. The president has made my community and my people the enemy. He has told the country that we are people to be feared, people to be hated." Presidential candidate Beto O'Rourke, who is from El Paso, stated: "Anyone who is surprised is part of this problem right now—including members of the media who ask, 'Hey Beto, do you think the president is racist?' Well, Jesus Christ, of course he's racist. He's been racist from day one."

In a speech on August 5 commenting on the recent shootings, Trump condemned racism and white supremacy, stating "These sinister ideologies must be defeated. Hate has no place in America."

=== Jewish voters who support Democrats "disloyal" ===
Trump states on August 20, 2019 "...I think any Jewish people that vote for a Democrat, I think it shows either a total lack of knowledge or great disloyalty." Video from White House

On August 20, 2019, after a reporter asked "Should there be any change in U.S. aid to Israel?", Donald Trump stated within his answer, "And I think any Jewish people that vote for a Democrat, I think it shows either a total lack of knowledge or great disloyalty." The quote caused outrage, shock and disdain from Jewish leaders and citizens in the United States. They claimed that the president was perpetuating anti-Semitic stereotypes. Democratic presidential candidate Bernie Sanders responded at a campaign rally in Iowa City: "I am a proud Jewish person, and I have no concerns about voting Democratic. And in fact, I intend to vote for a Jewish man to become the next president of the United States."

=== Support of Stephen Miller ===
The Trump administration has included several officials with ties to white nationalism. In November 2019, emails promoting white supremacist views sent by senior White House advisor Stephen Miller were made public. Despite widespread calls for his resignation (including by over 100 members of Congress), Trump continued to support Miller and did not condemn his advocacy of white supremacy.

=== Support of Rush Limbaugh ===
In February 2020, Trump awarded Rush Limbaugh the Presidential Medal of Freedom. Limbaugh had made numerous statements widely described as racist in his career as a radio personality.

=== "Chinese Virus" and "Kung Flu" ===
During a press conference in May 2020, CBS News Correspondent Weijia Jiang asked in reference to Covid testing, "Why is this a global competition to you if every day Americans are still losing their lives?", Trump told her, "They're losing their lives everywhere in the world. And maybe that's a question you should ask China. Don't ask me, ask China that question, OK?"

After he was widely criticized for using the term, Trump defended his use of "Chinese Virus" for SARS-CoV-2. Trump said, "it comes from China...it's not racist at all". Many people and organizations disagreed, including the Asian American Legal Defense and Education Fund, which tweeted in March 2020: "Of course he called it 'Chinese Virus,' because he doesn't care that Asians and Asian Americans are subjected to hate violence because of this racist description of #coronavirus." The World Health Organization has "called on scientists, national authorities and the media to follow best practices in naming new human infectious diseases to minimize unnecessary negative effects on nations, economies and people."

On June 20, 2020, in a speech in Tulsa, Oklahoma, Trump used language widely described as racist, referring to COVID-19 as "Kung Flu", a phrase that then Counselor to the President Kellyanne Conway had previously described as "wrong", "highly offensive" and "very hurtful". On June 22, 2020, White House spokespeople defended Trump's use of the term, stating: "It's not a discussion about Asian Americans, who the president values and prizes as citizens of this great country. It is an indictment of China for letting this virus get here".

=== "When the looting starts, the shooting starts" ===
In May 2020, Trump was accused of racism for tweeting "when the looting starts, the shooting starts" and stating "these thugs are dishonoring the memory of George Floyd" in response to a third night of arson and rioting in Minneapolis, during which the Minneapolis Third Precinct police station was set on fire, over the police killing of the unarmed Black man. The phrase had been used previously in 1967 by a Miami police chief, Walter Headley, that was widely condemned by civil rights groups and repeated in 1968 during the presidential campaign of segregationist George Wallace.

Washington, D.C. mayor Muriel Bowser criticised Trump for stating that protesters who climbed over the White House fence would be met by "the most vicious dogs and ominous of weapons", saying it was "no subtle reminder to African-Americans of segregationists that let dogs out on women, children and innocent people in the South".

=== Moving date of Tulsa rally ===
Trump had planned to hold his first rally since March on June 19, 2020, in Tulsa, Oklahoma, but this provoked an outcry as it would have overlapped Juneteenth—a day commemorating the end of slavery. The rally also caused controversy due to the location's associations with the Tulsa massacre, the worst case of racial violence in American history. Trump initially defended the plans, stating that his rally would be a celebration, but then announced that the rally would be moved to June 20 "out of respect".

=== Lincoln's end result "questionable" ===
In a June 12, 2020, interview with Fox News host Harris Faulkner, a Black woman, Trump claimed to have done more for Blacks than Abraham Lincoln. Trump suggested that although Lincoln "did good", the result was "always questionable" but when pressed admitted "So I'm going to take a pass on Abe."

=== Videos of Black men attacking white people ===
In June 2020, Trump tweeted videos of Black men attacking white people with captions questioning why no one was protesting the violence, and writing "So terrible!" Critics accused Trump of suggesting individual crimes committed by Black men are equivalent to the systemic violence against people of color by police officers, and fomenting racial division as the presidential election nears. Observers said that white supremacist sites often promote false notions of the prevalence of crimes committed by Blacks against whites.

=== "Bad hombres" and rapists ===
Trump has repeatedly called Mexican men "bad hombres" and "rapists". While campaigning in 2015 he made multiple false assertions that the Mexican government was sending their most unwanted people to the U.S.: "When Mexico sends their people... They're bringing drugs. They're bringing crime. They're rapists. And some, I assume, are good people." In 2017, the Associated Press reported that during a phone call to Mexican President Enrique Peña Nieto, Trump warned the Mexican president that his military was not doing enough to stop "a bunch of bad hombres down there" and threatened to send U.S. troops into Mexico to "take care of it."

Following the 2020 murder of George Floyd, some protesters used the slogan "Defund the police", supporting divesting some funds from police departments and reallocating them to non-policing forms of public safety and community support. Trump addressed this issue when speaking at a campaign rally in late June 2020, saying: "It's 1 o'clock in the morning and a very tough—you know I've used the word on occasion, 'hombre'—a very tough 'hombre' is breaking into the window of a young woman whose husband is away as a traveling salesman or whatever he may do. And you call 911 and they say, 'I'm sorry, this number is no longer working.'" After Trump posted a video that included his "bad hombres" comments on his Twitch channel, the livestreaming platform suspended his account due to "hateful conduct."

=== "White Power" retweet ===
On June 28, 2020, Trump retweeted video footage of Trump supporters and anti-Trump protesters arguing with one another during which a supporter is recorded yelling, among other things, 'White Power'. He praised supporters in the retweet, calling them "great people" in his caption of a video uploaded and tweeted by another account. Trump wrote "Thank you to the great people of The Villages. The Radical Left Do Nothing Democrats will Fall in the Fall. Corrupt Joe is shot. See you soon!!!". The tweet included an embedded video showing several pro-Trump senior citizens in Florida having an exchange with anti-Trump protestors and supporters of Black Lives Matter as well as Democratic presidential candidate Joe Biden. In the footage, one of the president's supporters repeatedly shouts "white power" at the demonstrators. Trump received intense condemnation for the tweet. Tim Scott, the only Black Republican in the senate, said Trump should "take it down". Three hours after posting it, Trump deleted the tweet without further comment, although White House Deputy Press Secretary Judd Deere and White House Press Secretary Kayleigh McEnany claimed that Trump had not heard the "white power" statement in the tweet. At a press conference two days later, McEnany did not respond to a reporter asking if President Trump condemned the use of the slogan "White power". McEnany later responded to questions about the tweet stating "The president took down that video, that deletion speaks strongly...the president has repeatedly condemned hate." It was later reported that President Trump's aides tried to reach him when the controversy started, but that he was unavailable for several hours because he was golfing at the Trump National Golf Club and had put his phone down.

=== Criticism of the Affirmatively Furthering Fair Housing program ===
In July 2020, Trump announced that he was considering the elimination of the Affirmatively Furthering Fair Housing, a program designed to address racial segregation in suburban areas. Shaun Donovan, the former secretary of the Housing and Urban Development department who is responsible for the creation of the policy, said that "Trump's tweet is racist and wrong..." Some suggested that the comments by Trump were intended to shore up support among white suburban voters, noting that the day before this tweet Trump had posted a video of a white couple in front of their house angrily pointing guns at protesters.

=== Independence Day speech ===
In a July 2020 Independence Day speech at Mount Rushmore, Trump criticized the "left-wing cultural revolution" that he said must "never be allowed to destroy our way of life or take away our freedom." The Washington Post reported that the speech was "a harsh denunciation of the racial justice movement". CNN reported, "Trump once again sought to deepen racial and cultural divisions in America rather than attempting to unify a country convulsed by the twin crises of the coronavirus pandemic and a sweeping reckoning on racism in America." Time magazine wrote, "At the foot of Mount Rushmore and on the eve of Independence Day, President Donald Trump dug deeper into America's divisions by accusing protesters who have pushed for racial justice of engaging in a "merciless campaign to wipe out our history."

NPRs Weekend Edition quoted Trump's words, "Our nation is witnessing a merciless campaign to wipe out our history, defame our heroes, erase our values and indoctrinate our children." White House correspondent Tamara Keith said, "He delivered this speech in front of Mount Rushmore, setting up this current moment in our country with people protesting racism and pushing for change as an epic battle over the soul of America. He used over-the-top language reminiscent of his American carnage inaugural address. At one point, he set up the left as having the goal of not making America better, but trying to defeat America." Speaking on CNN, Dianne Pinderhughes, professor of Africana Studies and Political Science at the University of Notre Dame, said "Trump's racism is not subtle at all. Every step he takes, every comment about human beings, murders or killings, he can't hold back. Even as Mississippi and other parts of the country remove Confederate symbols, he goes in the opposite direction as hard as he can."

=== Support for Confederate symbols ===
In the aftermath of the murder of George Floyd, numerous Confederate monuments and symbols were removed across the country due to their association with slavery and racism. In June 2020, Trump personally requested Interior Secretary David Bernhardt to restore a statue of Confederate General Albert Pike that had been taken down by protesters in Washington, D.C. Also in June, the US Army proposed discussions on the renaming of military bases that have been named after Confederate Army generals. Many people and organizations such as the NAACP have suggested renaming the bases after military heroes of color. Trump responded with a tweet stating that "my Administration will not even consider the renaming of these Magnificent and Fabled Military Installations." On June 30, Trump threatened to veto the National Defense Authorization Act due to a provision requiring renaming of bases named for Confederate commanders and the removal of Confederate symbols from all U.S. defense facilities. On July 6, he criticized NASCAR's decision to ban the Confederate flag from its events. When asked whether he thought the Confederate flag was offensive, Trump replied, "When people proudly hang their Confederate flags, they're not talking about racism. They love their flag, it represents the South."

=== Reversal of the Affirmatively Furthering Fair Housing Rule ===
On July 23, 2020, the Trump administration reversed the 2015 Obama administration Affirmatively Furthering Fair Housing Rule which was enacted to promote equal housing opportunities and level the playing field so that neighborhoods provided equal opportunities for all. Eugene Robinson commented that Trump's decision "may be the most nakedly racist appeal to White voters that I've seen since the days of segregationist state leaders such as Alabama's George Wallace and Georgia's Lester Maddox. NPR quoted political scientist Lynn Vavreck, who explained the rhetoric of his policy decision: "[Trump suggests] a suburb is the kind of community where great Americans live because we've limited it. I think it's just straight-up racializing this idea of housing. This is the kind of argument that Trump makes all the time: 'I'm going to tell you that these people are good, or us versus them. We, the good people, and they, the bad people. And we have to keep them out to keep our greatness.'"

=== Opposition to diversity training ===
In September 2020, Trump directed federal government agencies to discontinue anti-bias and racial sensitivity training for their employees. A memo from Office of Management and Budget Director Russell Vought says Trump has instructed him to cancel funding for what it calls "divisive, anti-American propaganda". The memo instructed Federal agencies to "begin to identify all contracts or other agency spending related to any training on 'critical race theory,' 'white privilege,' or any other training or propaganda effort that teaches or suggests either (1) that the United States is an inherently racist or evil country or (2) that any race or ethnicity is inherently racist or evil." Trump cited conservative media reports and retweeted Twitter posts to describe the policy.

In October 2020, the Justice Department suspended all diversity and inclusion and implicit bias training. Major universities also began to cancel diversity training, fearing loss of funding if found to be out of compliance with the executive order.

=== Allegations of racism by his former attorney ===
In his book published in September 2020, Michael Cohen, who was Trump's attorney for over ten years, alleged that Trump made racist comments on numerous occasions. Cohen said that "As a rule, Trump expressed low opinions of all Black folks, from music to culture and politics." Among other disparaging comments, Cohen alleged that Trump said "Tell me one country run by a Black person that isn't a shithole."

=== Interview with Bob Woodward ===
In his book published in September 2020, journalist Bob Woodward describes a recorded interview with Trump in which Woodward talks about white privilege. Woodward asked Trump if he was working to "understand the anger and the pain, particularly, Black people feel in this country". Trump replied "No. You really drank the Kool-Aid, didn't you? Just listen to you. Wow. No, I don't feel that at all."

=== Rolling back civil rights protections ===
In January 2021, the Trump administration's Department of Justice sought approval to end enforcement of the Civil Rights Act in cases of "disparate impact" on minorities. According to Civil rights groups, not being able to use disparate impact analysis would result in less accountability for organizations with policies that result in racially disparate outcomes, such as discipline for students of color, and treatment of residents of color by their city's police force.

=== 1776 Commission ===
In September 2020, the Trump administration formed the 1776 Commission as rebuke to the 1619 Project, and "as a rebuttal to schools applying a more accurate history curriculum around slavery in the US". The commission was part of Trump's response to the Black Lives Matter anti-racism protests, that followed the murder of George Floyd. Trump stated that "the left-wing rioting and mayhem are the direct result of decades of left-wing indoctrination in our schools." The commission was chaired by Carol Swain and Larry Arnn, the president of Hillsdale College. On January 18, 2021 (Martin Luther King Jr. Day), the commission released a report. Commenting on the Civil Rights movement, the report said "[the movement] almost immediately turned to programs that ran counter to the lofty ideals of the founders." The executive director of the American Historical Association, noted that the commission did not include a single professional United States historian. He commented, "They're using something they call history to stoke culture wars".

=== Funding for the Community Relations Service ===
The Community Relations Service (CRS) is part of the United States Department of Justice. The office is intended to act as a peacemaker for community conflicts and tensions arising from differences of race, national origin, gender, sexual orientation, disability, and religion. During Trumps term in office the CRS was targeted for elimination or severe staffing reductions. The president of one advocacy group, Asian Americans advancing Justice, spoke out saying the administration threatened to discontinue its entire budget, which had ranged between $15 million and $16 million.

== 2020 campaign ==
=== Kamala Harris citizenship conspiracy theories ===
During an August 13, 2020, press conference President Trump was asked whether then-Senator Kamala Harris, the Democratic Party's 2020 nominee for VP, was constitutionally eligible to be vice president. The question arose after John C. Eastman, a professor at Chapman University, wrote an op-ed in Newsweek claiming that Harris was not actually an American citizen, since neither of the parents were United States citizens at the time of her birth (a fringe interpretation of the Constitution's Citizenship Clause). The reporter commented "there are claims circulating in social media that Kamala Harris is not eligible to be... to run for vice president because she was an anchor baby, I think" and asked Trump "do you or can you definitively say whether or not Kamala Harris is eligible, meets the legal requirements, to run as vice president?"

Trump's reply did not acknowledge an understanding of what the slang "anchor baby" means (a child born within the United States to a non-citizen mother) or that Harris was born in California.

I just heard it today that she doesn't meet the requirements and by the way the lawyer that wrote that piece is a very highly qualified, very talented lawyer. I have no idea if that's right. I would have assumed the Democrats would have checked that out before she gets chosen to run for vice-president. But that's a very serious, you're saying that, they're saying that she doesn't qualify because she wasn't born in this country.

The female reporter corrected Trump, saying: "No, she was born in this country but her parents did not, uh, the claims say her parents did not receive their permanent residency at that time". Trump replied "Yeah, I don't know about it, I just heard about it, I'll take a look."

Trump was widely criticized for promoting a conspiracy theory that had been thoroughly debunked. The Biden campaign condemned the president's statement, describing Trump's promotion of the conspiracy theory as "abhorrent", and also criticized his role in the birther movement against former president Obama.

Some commentators considered Trump's comments to be a racist and anti-immigrant attack, undermining the legitimacy of the children of immigrants of color as legitimate Americans. This view was repeated when Trump made a similar attack against Nikki Haley during the 2024 Republican Presidential primaries, viewing it as part of a pattern of attacks similar to his attacks on Obama, Cruz, and Harris, aiming to marginalize Americans who are not white. Tamara Keith also pointed out that Trump's own mother immigrated to the United States from Scotland.

=== "Good genes" ===
At a September 18, 2020, rally in Bemidji, Minnesota, Trump told a mostly white audience, "You have good genes, you know that, right? You have good genes. A lot of it is about the genes, isn't it, don't you believe? The racehorse theory? You think we're so different. You have good genes in Minnesota." Many cited these remarks as eugenic and related them to Nazism during World War II.

=== First 2020 presidential debate ===
At a debate with presidential candidate Joe Biden on September 29, 2020, moderator Chris Wallace asked Trump if he would "condemn white supremacists and groups to say they need to stand down and not add to the violence." Trump responded, "Sure. I'm willing to do that." Trump asked for clarification, saying: "Who would you like me to condemn?" Biden said the Proud Boys. Trump then stated "Proud Boys, stand back and stand by, but I'll tell you what, I'll tell you what, somebody's got to do something about Antifa and the left, because this is not a right-wing problem." One researcher said that Proud Boys memberships on Telegram channels grew nearly 10 percent after the debate. The Washington Post reported that Trump's comments were quickly "enshrined in memes, including one depicting Trump in one of the Proud Boys' signature polo shirts. Another meme showed Trump's quote alongside an image of bearded men carrying American flags and appearing to prepare for a fight. A third incorporated "STAND BACK AND STAND BY" into the group's logo."

The following day when asked about his comments he replied, "I don't know who the Proud Boys are. I mean, you'll have to give me a definition, because I really don't know who they are. I can only say they have to stand down, let law enforcement do their work...the problem is on the left." When asked directly if he would denounce white supremacy later on that day, Trump replied, "I've always denounced – any form, any form, any form of any of that – you have to denounce." Appearing on Sean Hannity's Fox show, Trump said "I've said it many times, and let me be clear again: I condemn the [Ku Klux Klan]. I condemn all white supremacists. I condemn the Proud Boys. I don't know much about the Proud Boys, almost nothing. But I condemn that."

NPR journalist William Brangham spoke with Janai Nelson of the NAACP Legal Defense and Educational Fund and Kathleen Belew, a historian at the University of Chicago who studies the white power movement in America. Belew noted that the white power movement took his words to mean "stand by for further action," as evidenced by the fact that his words had now been incorporated into their logo design. Nelson commented, "What we witnessed last night was the president of the United States, with all the country and all the world watching, stand in solidarity with white supremacy. And, unlike his previous comments, this time, he spoke directly to them. He told them to stand back and stand by."

== Inter-presidency and 2024 campaign ==
=== Truth Social posts ===
In October 2022, Trump made a post on his social media website Truth Social attacking Mitch McConnell and his Taiwanese wife, Elaine Chao, calling her "China loving wife, Coco Chow". Chao served under the Trump administration as Secretary of Transportation and has been an American citizen for over 50 years. After the 2022 midterms, Trump made a post on Truth Social attacking Virginia's Republican governor Glenn Youngkin and deliberately misspelled his name as "Young Kin" and said "Sounds Chinese, doesn't it?". His comments were described as racist by some, including Maryland's Republican governor Larry Hogan.

=== Meeting with Nick Fuentes and Kanye West ===
In late November 2022, Kanye West (who had recently announced his own candidacy for the 2024 presidential election) visited Trump at Mar-a-Lago, along with white nationalist and Holocaust denier Nick Fuentes. On November 24, West released a video in which he stated that Trump began screaming at him and telling him that he was going to lose after West asked Trump to be his vice-presidential candidate, stating, "Trump started basically screaming at me at the table telling me I was going to lose – I mean has that ever worked for anyone in history. I'm like hold on, hold on, hold on, Trump, you're talking to Ye". Trump, for his part, released a statement that after contacting him earlier in the week to arrange the visit, West "unexpectedly showed up with three of his friends, whom I knew nothing about", with whom Trump dined, and that "the dinner was quick and uneventful".

=== Poisoning of blood comment ===
In an October 2023 interview, Trump said undocumented immigrants were "poisoning the blood of our country," echoing language often used by white supremacists who fixate on so-called blood purity. Adolf Hitler wrote of the "contamination of the blood" or "blood poisoning" in Mein Kampf. Jonathan Greenblatt of the Anti-Defamation League called Trump's comments "racist, xenophobic and despicable." Trump spokesman Steven Cheung said in a statement, "That's a normal phrase that is used in everyday life – in books, television, movies, and in news articles. For anyone to think that is racist or xenophobic is living in an alternate reality consumed with non-sensical outrage."

Trump repeated the phrase "they're poisoning the blood of our country" during a December 16, 2023 rally, and has continued repeating the phrase throughout his 2024 presidential campaign.

=== Indictments and mug shot comments ===
On February 23, 2024, Trump was criticized for comments during a campaign speech for saying his four criminal indictments and mug shot boosted his appeal among Black voters and for comparing his legal jeopardy to historical anti-Black discrimination, stating that "when I did the mug shot in Atlanta, that mug shot is No. 1. You know who embraced it more than anyone else? The Black population."

=== Dehumanizing rhetoric about undocumented immigrants ===
During his 2024 campaign, Trump made several dehumanizing comments against undocumented immigrants, and made comments stating they were subhuman. Trump has repeatedly stated that some immigrants are "not people," "not humans," "animals," and described them as deadly snakes by repurposing lyrics from the 1968 song "The Snake." Trump has compared migrants to patients in insane asylums and the fictional serial killer Hannibal Lecter, and falsely claimed that rogue nations are "pumping migrants across our wide open border" and "sending prisoners, murders, drug dealers, mental patients, terrorists".

=== Claims about Kamala Harris's background ===
On July 31, 2024, Trump was interviewed at the National Association of Black Journalists. When asked if he believed his opponent in the 2024 presidential election, then-Vice President Kamala Harris, who is biracial as well as the first Black woman and first Indian American major presidential nominee in American history, was a "DEI hire", he started to question her race, saying that she was always Indian and promoted her Indian identity until she "happened to turn Black". He later again questioned her race by posting a video on his Truth Social account showing Harris, in his words, "saying she's Indian, not Black" and calling her a "stone cold phony." Additionally, at one of his rallies in Pennsylvania, news articles of Harris becoming the first Indian American US senator were displayed, supposedly to continue questioning her Black identity. Trump's comments were interpreted by various media outlets as racist and implying that multiracial people must pick one identity to align themselves with.

=== Springfield pet-eating hoax ===
In his only debate with Harris, Trump alleged without evidence that Haitian immigrants in Springfield, Ohio were eating dogs and cats. After the claims spread, dozens of bomb threats targeted Springfield schools, hospitals, public buildings, and businesses. These threats were often accompanied by anti-Haitian messages.

== Second presidency ==
=== Potomac aviation accident ===
Following the 2025 Potomac River mid-air collision, Trump blamed, without evidence, diversity, equity, and inclusion policies for the crash. Trump's comments were described as racist.

The probable cause of the collision, according to the NTSB, was the placement of a helicopter route in close proximity to a runway approach path by the Federal Aviation Administration (FAA). The FAA did not regularly evaluate route safety data and did not implement recommendations proposed to reduce risk of midair collision near Ronald Reagan Washington National Airport. Also, the air traffic system was overreliant on visual separation for efficiency, discarding the inherent limitations of this "see-and-avoid" concept, and the helicopter crew did not apply visual separation, causing the collision.

=== Use of Palestinian as a slur ===
In March 2025, Trump was criticized for saying, "Schumer is a Palestinian, as far as I'm concerned. He's become a Palestinian (...) He used to be Jewish. He's not Jewish anymore. He's a Palestinian". Previously, at the 2024 presidential debate with Joe Biden on June 27, 2024, Trump was also criticized after saying, "He has become like a Palestinian. But, they don't like him because he is a very bad Palestinian. He is a weak one."

=== Immigration policy ===
"Stopping" people
you have nothing in common with

And if you don't stop people that you've never seen before, that you have nothing in common with, your country is going to fail. ... This double-tailed monster [of green energy and immigration] destroys everything in its wake, and they cannot let that happen any longer. You're doing it because you want to be nice, you want to be politically correct, and you're destroying your heritage.

— President Donald Trump
to the UN General Assembly,
September 23, 2025

While Trump has made opposition to immigration the center of his campaigns, the administration notably made an exception for Afrikaners.

=== False claims of white genocide ===
In May 2025, Trump confronted South African president Cyril Ramaphosa with false claims of white genocide in South Africa during an Oval Office meeting, and played a video he said supported his position.

=== Calling exploitative bankers "shylocks" ===
During a campaign-style speech for America250 on July 3, 2025, Trump called bankers who exploit their clients "shylocks". The term "shylock" is classified by the Anti-Defamation League as an antisemitic stereotype. Shylock was a fictional Jewish money lender in Shakespeare's play The Merchant of Venice.

Trump later claimed to be unaware the term was used in an antisemitic way. Yet he said, "The meaning of Shylock is somebody that's a money lender at high rates. You view it differently. I've never heard that." This clearly indicated that Trump was familiar with the character and the play.

=== Anti-Somali remarks ===
The Somalians should be out of here. They've destroyed our country. And all they do is complain, complain, complain.

— Donald Trump on December 3, 2025,

Trump in a Cabinet Meeting on December 2, 2025

Donald Trump in May 2026, "They're all crooks. The Somalians are what they've done to Minnesota. The Somalians, they're crooked as hell. Ilhan Omar, crooked as hell. They're all crooks. And we got them. We got them. Now we're putting the clamps on."

Trump speaks about Afghans and Somalians in November 2025 after the 2025 Washington, D.C., National Guard shooting

During a meeting of his cabinet on December 2, 2025, Trump said that Somalia "stinks and we don't want them in our country," that Somali American representative Ilhan Omar and other Somali immigrants are "garbage," that "these aren’t people that work. These aren’t people who say, 'Let's go, come on, let's make this place great,'" that "their country is no good for a reason," and that "they contribute nothing... When they come from hell and they complain and do nothing but bitch, we don’t want them in our country. Let them go back to where they came from and fix it."

When questioned about these remarks by reporters the following day, Trump doubled down on his opinions, stating that Somalia is "not even a nation. It’s just people walking around killing each other", that Somalian immigrants "have destroyed Minnesota", and that "Somalia is considered by many to be the worst country on Earth." Somalia has been described as a failed state, but Trump was denigrating Somali people, not the country of Somalia or its leaders.

In a speech on December 9, 2025 in Mount Pocono, Pennsylvania, Trump mentioned referring to "shithole countries" at a 2018 Oval Office meeting, and referred to Somalia as "Filthy, dirty, disgusting, ridden with crime. The only thing they’re good at is going after ships."

Previously, Trump claimed that Somalis were "taking over" Minnesota and that Somali gangs were "roving the streets looking for 'prey'." He also said that Ilhan Omar was "always wrapped in her swaddling hijab" and that Tim Walz was "seriously retarded" for welcoming Somali immigrants.

On February 24, 2026, he made similar remarks in his 2026 State of the Union address, lambasting "the Somali pirates who ransacked Minnesota" for committing fraud and stressed that "importing these cultures through unrestricted immigration and open borders brings those problems right here."

Trump said Somalis have low IQs in March 2026; in April, when he said: "And they’re low IQ, generally, I mean, I can generalize, they’re low IQ people, they’re bad people"; and at a rally in October.

=== Civil rights ===
In a 2026 interview, Trump was asked about the civil rights movement and replied that "White people were very badly treated, where they did extremely well and they were not invited to go into a university to college...So I would say in that way, I think it was unfair in certain cases." Speaking about the Civil Rights Act, Trump said "it accomplished some very wonderful things, but it also hurt a lot of people — people that deserve to go to a college or deserve to get a job were unable to get a job. So it was, it was a reverse discrimination".

=== Posting video depicting the Obamas as apes ===
In February 2026, Trump received criticism for posting a racist video depicting Barack and Michelle Obama as apes dancing in a jungle. The White House defended the videos and described the reaction as "fake outrage". The video elicited bipartisan condemnation, and Trump took it down several hours later. Trump declined to apologize for posting the video, stating "I didn't make a mistake". The Trump administration later blamed a staffer for the post. A week later, Press Secretary Karoline Leavitt stated that all posts on Truth Social were "straight from the horse's mouth", directly contradicting claims made earlier that a staffer had "erroneously made the post". It was later revealed that the video had been posted by his close assistant Natalie Harp.

=== Attacks on Abdul El-Sayed ===
During the 2026 U.S. Senate election in Michigan, Trump repeatedly targeted Democratic nominee Abdul El-Sayed, an Egyptian-American Muslim, in a series of attacks widely condemned as racist and Islamophobic. Throughout the campaign, Trump labeled El-Sayed a "jihadist" and "terrorist sympathizer", mocked his name, and said he should be required to pass through a metal detector before entering the Senate chamber.

== Impact ==
Donald Trump has been accused of "inflaming racial, ethnic and religious tensions across the United States." The Southern Poverty Law Center recorded 867 "hate incidents" in the 10 days after the 2016 presidential election, a phenomenon it partly blamed on Trump's rhetoric. They consider the actual number of incidents to be much higher because most hate crimes go unreported. SPLC president J. Richard Cohen blamed the recent surge on the divisive language used by Trump throughout his campaign. In a statement he said: "Mr Trump claims he's surprised his election has unleashed a barrage of hate across the country. But he shouldn't be. It's the predictable result of the campaign he waged."

In 2016, US attorney general Loretta Lynch said that FBI statistics for 2015 showed a 67% increase in hate crimes against Muslim Americans; hate crimes against Jews, African Americans, and LGBT individuals increased as well. Lynch reported a 6% overall increase, though she said the number could be higher because many incidents go unreported. In New York City the number of hate crimes increased 31.5% in the year from 2015 to 2016. Mayor Bill de Blasio commented, "A lot of us are very concerned that a lot of divisive speech was used during the campaign by the President-elect, and we do not yet know what the impact of that will be on our country."

Between 2014 and 2018, the number of hate groups skyrocketed 30%, reaching 892 in 2015; 917 in 2016; 954 in 2017; and to a record number 1,020 in 2018. According to Mark Potok at the SPLC, Donald Trump's presidential campaign speeches "demonizing statements about Latinos and Muslims have electrified the radical right, leading to glowing endorsements from white nationalist leaders such as Jared Taylor and former Klansman David Duke".

The Ku Klux Klan held a rally at the Charlottesville Unite the Right rally in 2017. Former grand wizard David Duke spoke calling the demonstrations a "turning point" saying, "We are going to fulfill the promises of Donald Trump. That's what we believed in. That's why we voted for Donald Trump, because he said he's going to take our country back."

A 2018 study found that Trump's anti-establishment campaign positions, for example his frequent "drain the swamp" rhetoric, was less of a draw for voters than were his negative attitudes towards ethnic minorities and sexism. One study found that "Trump's rhetoric and rallies served to heighten white identity and increase the perceived threat facing white Americans [and found] that counties which hosted a Trump rally saw a 226% increase in hate-motivated incidents." In 2019, the Brookings Institution reported that statistics show that Trump's racist rhetoric has resulted in an increase in violence in America. Their study found "substantial evidence that Trump has encouraged racism and benefitted politically from it." Looking at hate crime figures in which Trump had won the election they found a jump of hate crimes, the second largest jump in 25 years, the first being September 11, 2001.

=== Effects on students ===
A survey of over 10,000 teachers conducted by the Southern Poverty Law Center's Teaching Tolerance project after the 2016 presidential election showed that "the results of the election are having a profoundly negative impact on schools and students." Most respondents believe the impact will be long-lasting. Respondents reported an increase in "verbal harassment, the use of slurs and derogatory language, and disturbing incidents involving swastikas, Nazi salutes and Confederate flags". "Nearly a third of the incidents were motivated by anti-immigrant sentiment and anti-Black incidents were the second-most common, with frequent references to lynching. Antisemitic and anti-Muslim attacks were common as well. The SPLC believes "the dynamics and incidents these educators reported are nothing short of a crisis and should be treated as such." SPLC president Richard Cohen commented, "We've seen Donald Trump behave like a 12 year old, and now we're seeing 12 year olds behave like Donald Trump."

A 2020 survey of news stories since Trump's election found 300 reports that involved incidents of student bullying that were related to Trump's remarks or his MAGA campaign chants. At least three-quarters of the attacks were directed at Black, Hispanic or Muslim students, but the report also found 45 cases of students being attacked because they were Trump supporters. The survey found that parents, players, or fans had used Trump's name or his words at least 48 times directed at students competing in elementary, middle and high school sporting events. Since most incidents are never reported it is believed that the figures they found are only a fraction of the actual total.

=== Effects on children ===
Sociologist Margaret Hagerman studies and writes about young people's views on racism and current events in America. In her latest work, published in 2018, she reports on her conversations with young people as related to the election of Trump as president. She writes:

"Every child of color I interviewed not only articulated disgust and outrage with the president's racist language and actions but also described feeling scared, angry, anxious, upset, and worried because of Trump's presidency and specifically what his racist actions might mean for themselves or the people they love."

Comparing the children of color to white children she writes:

"For some of the white children I spoke with, this reality [of racism] seems to be connected to empathy, anger, and a sense of concern for their peers. But, for other white children, this reality simply does not matter, even though they know and can acknowledge that it exists."

Education researchers Huang and Cornell found that in Virginia, rates of teasing and bullying, including about race, were correlated with regional differences in support for Trump's 2016 campaign: areas of Virginia with stronger support for Donald Trump also had higher rates of racial bullying after the election (but not before).

=== Reactions by the Congressional Black Caucus ===
Members of the Congressional Black Caucus (CBC) have criticized Trump for "repeatedly stirring racial controversies." Emanuel Cleaver, former head of the CBC, voiced concerns when Trump began raising doubts about President Obama's birthplace: "I don't know if the people around the country understand that he has launched ... an assault against African-American people starting with his refusal to accept the first African-American president, by continuing to declare that he was from Kenya. No other president in history has had to face that kind of criticism. We've come to conclude that this is a part of his belief system."

Some lawmakers protested by refusing to attend Trump's 2018 State of the Union Address. John Lewis said "I've got to be moved by my conscience," and Barbara Lee said "This president does not respect the office, he dishonors it." Frederica Wilson, whom Trump called "wacky" after she supported the wife of a soldier killed in Niger, also skipped the address. Maxine Waters released a video response wherein she said, "He claims that he's bringing people together but make no mistake, he is a dangerous, unprincipled, divisive, and shameful racist." Other Black lawmakers attended the address wearing kente stoles as a show of support following Trump's "shithole" comments about African and other countries.

Almost two-thirds of the CBC have backed efforts to impeach Donald Trump in House floor votes forced by Representative Al Green. Green's articles of impeachment assert that Trump has "brought the high office of president of the United States in contempt, ridicule, disgrace and disrepute" and "has sown discord among the people of the United States".

== Defenses of Donald Trump ==
Donald Trump states "I am the least racist person there is anywhere in the world." July 30, 2019

Trump has repeatedly denied claims that he is racist, often stating that he is "the least racist person". Various friends, members of his administration and people who have known him, including some Black Americans, have stated that Trump is not racist. Ben Carson, who was the Trump administration's Secretary of Housing and Urban Development, explained his evidence for this belief, stating "When he bought Mar-a-Lago, he was the one who fought for Jews and blacks to be included in the clubs that were trying to exclude them. You know, people say he's a racist, he is not a racist." At the 2020 Republican National Convention, Herschel Walker, a close friend of Trump's for 37 years, defended him from charges of racism, saying "Growing up in the Deep South I've seen racism up close. I know what it is, and it isn't Donald Trump."

Though perceived as anti-immigrant, Trump is himself the son of an immigrant mother and has twice married wives who were immigrants. He has often celebrated his immigrant heritage. During the 2016 U.S. presidential election, Trump defended himself against accusations that his immigration policies were racist, stating "I will never apologize for pledging to enforce and uphold every single law of the United States, and to make my immigration priority defending and protecting American citizens above every other single consideration."

In a 2019 response to mass shootings he stated "In one voice, our nation must condemn racism, bigotry and white supremacy".

Trump and his allies have often pointed to record-low unemployment numbers among Blacks and Hispanics during his presidency as evidence that he is not a racist and that his administration is benefiting racial minorities. In 2019, Trump received an award from the 20/20 Bipartisan Justice Center for his administration's work to pass the First Step Act, which granted early release to thousands of non-violent offenders who were serving time in federal prisons. Evidence suggests Black men were the main beneficiaries of the Act.

== Support from white nationalists and white supremacists ==
From the outset of his campaign, Trump was endorsed by various white nationalist and white supremacist movements and leaders. On February 24, 2016, David Duke, a former Ku Klux Klan Grand Dragon, expressed vocal support for Trump's campaign on his radio show. Shortly thereafter in an interview with Jake Tapper, Trump repeatedly claimed to be ignorant of Duke and his support. Republican presidential rivals were quick to respond on his wavering, and Senator Marco Rubio stated the Duke endorsement made Trump un-electable. Others questioned his professed ignorance of Duke. Trump stated that he had previously disavowed Duke in a tweet posted with a video on his Twitter account. On March 3, 2016, Trump stated: "David Duke is a bad person, who I disavowed on numerous occasions over the years. I disavowed him. I disavowed the KKK."

On August 25, 2016, Hillary Clinton gave a speech saying that Trump is "taking hate groups mainstream and helping a radical fringe take over the Republican Party." She identified this radical fringe with the "Alt-right", a largely online variation of American far-right that embraces white nationalism and is anti-immigration. During the election season, the Alt-right movement "evangelized" online in support of racist and anti-semitic ideologies. On September 9, 2016, several leaders of the alt-right community held a press conference, described by one reporter as the "coming-out party" of the little-known movement, to explain their goals. They affirmed their racialist beliefs, stating "Race is real, race matters, and race is the foundation of identity." Speakers called for a "White Homeland" and expounded on racial differences in intelligence. They also confirmed their support of Trump, saying "This is what a leader looks like."

Richard Spencer, who runs the white nationalist National Policy Institute, said, "Before Trump, our identity ideas, national ideas, they had no place to go". Andrew Anglin, the editor of the neo-Nazi website The Daily Stormer stated, "Virtually every alt-right Nazi I know is volunteering for the Trump campaign." Rocky Suhayda, chairman of the American Nazi Party, said that although Trump "isn't one of us," his election would be a "real opportunity" for the white nationalist movement. Neo-Nazi James Mason expressed that the election of Donald Trump gave him hope, commenting that "in order to Make America Great Again, you have to make it white again".

The Southern Poverty Law Center monitored Trump's campaign throughout the election and noted several instances where Trump and lower-level surrogates either used white nationalist rhetoric or engaged with figures in the white nationalist movement.

According to a 2021 study in Public Opinion Quarterly, Trump's candidacy simultaneously attracted whites with extreme views on race and made his white supporters more likely to express more extreme views on race.

== Analysis ==
=== Journalists and pundits ===
Following the incident in which Trump referred to several nations as "shithole countries", some media commentators moved from describing certain words and actions of Trump as manifesting racism, to calling Trump racist. David Brooks, speaking on PBS NewsHour, called the president's statements "pretty clearly racist" and said, "It fits into a pattern that we have seen since the beginning of his career, maybe through his father's career, frankly. There's been a consistency, pattern of harsh judgment against Black and brown people." Trump has been called a racist by a number of New York Times columnists including Nicholas Kristof ("I don't see what else we can call him but a racist"), Charles M. Blow ("Trump Is a Racist. Period."), and David Leonhardt ("Donald Trump is a racist"). Additionally, John Cassidy of The New Yorker concluded, "we have a racist in the Oval Office." CNN White House correspondent Jim Acosta said the Washington Post report combined with statements made in 2016 and 2017 shows "the president seems to harbor racist feelings about people of color from other parts of the world."

Conservative pundit and former Republican National Committee chairman Michael Steele, when asked in an interview in January 2018 if he thought Trump was a racist replied, "Yeah, I do. At this point the evidence is incontrovertible." Speaking on MSNBC, Steele said, "There are a whole lot of folks like Donald Trump. White folks in this country who have a problem with the browning of America. When they talk about [wanting] their country back, they are talking about a country that was very safely white, less brown and less committed to that browning process."

Australian political commentator and former Liberal party leader John Hewson writes in January 2018 that he believes the recent global movements against traditional politics and politicians are based on racism and prejudice. He comments: "There should be little doubt about US President Donald Trump's views on race, despite his occasional 'denials', assertions of 'fake news', and/or his semantic distinctions. His election campaign theme was effectively a promise to 'Make America Great Again; America First and Only' and—nod, nod, wink, wink—to Make America White Again." In July 2019, five New York Times writers stated that Trump has "decades" of history where he exploited "America's racial, ethnic and religious divisions" for personal gains of "ratings, fame, money or power", while ignoring negative consequences.

Following Trump's defense of Confederate symbols in 2020, several journalists and pundits accused Trump of being racist and pandering to white voters. CNN host Anderson Cooper said, "Instead of talking about the virus and doing things about it, he's spending his time trying to distract now with racist and jingoistic talk... He's now just leaning full into the racist he's long been." Author and former Republican political strategist Rick Wilson said, "Bannon sold him on the 'whites are 62% of the electorate, and we need to simply top out their numbers to win' argument very early... Plus, he's a racist." Conservative political columnist Jennifer Rubin wrote, "[Trump] is making racist statements and venerating racist symbols... It is part of decades of racist rhetoric. Let's not mince words." Author and columnist Dana Milbank wrote, "To the extent Trump's racist provocation is a strategy (rather than simply an instinct), it is a miscalculation... Trump's racism has alienated a large number of white people."

=== Academics ===
Doug McAdam writes that Trump "is just giving unusually loud and frank voice to views already typical among large numbers of Republicans" and "has pushed the GOP toward ever further racist and nativist extremes." McAdam believes that the Republican Party shift away from more liberal views on matters of racial equality began with Richard Nixon's presidency.

Presidential historian Douglas Brinkley said "What Trump is doing has popped up periodically, but in modern times, no president has been so racially insensitive and shown outright disdain for people who aren't white."

George Yancy, a professor at Emory University known for his work on racial issues, concluded that Trump is racist, describing his outlook as "a case of unabashed white supremacist ideas."

Speaking shortly after Trump's election in 2016, John McWhorter discussed the fact that 8% of Black voters and around 25% of Latinos voted for Donald Trump, saying "many would see it as 'conservative' for a person of color to vote for a racist, as if it were still a time when racism was socially acceptable." In his view, people of color who voted for Trump were willing to look beyond Trump's racism to the promise of economic improvement.

David P. Bryden, a professor of law emeritus at the University of Minnesota, suggested that Trump was willing to "vilif[y] all those of any race whom he regards as obstacles to his ambitions." According to Bryden, Trump's targets are largely from minority groups because he wants to appeal to white working class voters who believe that progressives resent them.

Pulido et al. published a study in 2018 comparing racism and environmental deregulation during the first year of Trump's presidency. The authors described that "transgressive" racism, or "spectacular" racism, is a "hallmark" of Trump's presidential campaign and presidency, with Trump employing it for "numerous political objectives, including dehumanizing his targets, consolidating his power, eroding democratic norms, and distracting from policy and legal changes". The result of Trump's racism is that "U.S. racial formation" has changed. "Overt white supremacy" has emerged in racial culture. The authors document that in the first year of Trump's presidency, there were 83 racial actions and 173 environmental actions; meanwhile there were 271 instances of racial speech and 22 instances of environmental speech. The authors concluded that "actions were more likely to be environmentally related, whereas rhetoric was more likely to be racist", further positing that "spectacular racism has helped obscure the relatively smooth and devastating deregulation." However, the authors also cautioned that the numbers of actions taken "do not indicate impact", specifically pointing to the Muslim ban and restriction of asylum claims.

=== Judicial rulings ===
In a 2025 temporary protected status (TPS) ruling in the case of National TPS Alliance v. Noem, judge Edward M. Chen wrote, "President Trump also made a number of discriminatory statements – and not only about Venezuelan immigrants and/or TPS holders specifically, but also about non-white immigrants and/or TPS holders generally," citing examples such as "eating the dogs", "shithole countries", and calling non-white immigrants "animals".

In a Ninth Circuit opinion affirming the lower court's decision in that case, judge Salvador Mendoza wrote, "The record is replete with public statements by Secretary Noem and President Donald Trump that evince a hostility toward, and desire to rid the country of, TPS holders who are Venezuelan and Haitian... these statements were overtly founded on racist stereotyping based on country of origin." Mendoza added, "When decision-makers so brazenly broadcast their racially charged reasons for reaching a decision, we should take them at their word."

On February 2, 2026, Judge Ana C. Reyes stayed a TPS termination order in Lesly Miot vs Donald J. Trump. In her opinion she wrote, "President Trump has made—freely, at times even boastfully—several derogatory statements about Haitians and other nonwhite foreigners... He has described immigrants as 'not people,', 'snakes,' and 'garbage,' who have 'bad genes.'" Reyes also noted, "to its credit, the Government does not defend President Trump’s derogatory statements. No one rationally could". In her dissenting opinion in the same case, Supreme Court justice Elena Kagan described Trump's statements as "so repellent and racially inflected that the majority declines to put them in print".

=== The United Nations ===
On March 11, 2026, the United Nations Committee on the Elimination of Racial Discrimination issued a statement condemning "racist hate speech by political leaders, including the President". The Committee warned they were "deeply disturbed" by the use of derogatory and dehumanizing language toward migrants, refugees, and asylum seekers. “Portraying them as criminals or as a burden, by politicians and influential public figures at the highest level, particularly the President,” the Committee wrote, “may incite racial discrimination and hate crimes.” The committee has published reports condemning the United States for racism and discrimination in the past, but this report is unique in specifically citing the President's speech.

== Opinion polling ==
According to an August 2016 Suffolk University poll, 7% of those planning to vote for Trump thought he was racist. A November 2016 Post-ABC poll found that 50% of Americans thought Trump was biased against Black people; the figure was 75% among Black Americans. According to an October 2017 Politico/Morning Consult poll, 45% of voters thought Trump was a racist while 40% thought he was not.

A Quinnipiac poll asking the question, "Since the election of Donald Trump, do you believe the level of hatred and prejudice in the U.S. has increased, the level of hatred and prejudice has decreased, or hasn't it changed either way" was conducted in December 2017. Of the respondents, 62% believed that the level had increased, 4% felt that it had decreased, and 31% felt it was without change.

A Quinnipiac poll conducted in January 2018 after Trump's Oval Office comments about immigration showed that 58 percent of American voters found the comments to be racist, while 59 percent said that he does not respect people of color as much as he respects white people.

Analysis of pre- and post-election surveys from the American National Election Studies, as well as numerous other surveys and studies, show that since the rise of Trump in the Republican Party, attitudes towards racism have become a more significant factor than economic issues in determining voters' party allegiance. According to a July 2019 Politico/Morning Consult poll, 54% of American voters viewed Trump as racist and 38% did not. A Quinnipiac University poll released in July found that 51% of voters believed that Trump is a racist while 45% said that he is not.

== See also ==
- Donald Trump and antisemitism
- Donald Trump and Islamophobia
- Immigration policy of the first Trump administration
- Immigration policy of the second Trump administration
- Rhetoric of Donald Trump
- Remigration § United States
