= Greatest Hits (Lee Greenwood album) =

Greatest hits album by Lee Greenwood
- Released: September 16, 1985
- Genre: Country
- Length: 33:15
- Label: MCA
- Producer: Jerry Crutchfield

Lee Greenwood chronology
Streamline (1985)	Greatest Hits (1985)	Love Will Find Its Way to You (1986)

Greatest Hits is the first compilation album by American country music artist Lee Greenwood. It was released on September 16, 1985, via MCA Records. The album includes the hit single "Dixie Road".

== Track listing ==
No.	Title	Writer(s)	Length
1.	"Fool's Gold"	Don Roth, Timmy Tappen	3:42
2.	"Somebody's Gonna Love You"	Rafe Van Hoy, Don Cook	3:42
3.	"It Turns Me Inside Out"	Jan Crutchfield	3:34
4.	"She's Lying"	Jan Crutchfield	3:05
5.	"Dixie Road"	Don Goodman, Pam Rose, Mary Ann Kennedy	2:39
6.	"Ain't No Trick (It Takes Magic)"	Jim Hurt, Steve Pippin	3:22
7.	"Ring on Her Finger, Time on Her Hands"	Goodman, Rose, Kennedy	3:38
8.	"I.O.U"	Kerry Chater, Austin Roberts	3:05
9.	"Going, Going, Gone"	Jan Crutchfield	3:19
10.	"God Bless the U.S.A."	Lee Greenwood	3:09

== Chart performance ==
Chart (1985)	Peak position
US Billboard 200	163
US Top Country Albums (Billboard)	4

== Certifications ==
Region	Certification	Certified units/sales
United States (RIAA)	Platinum	1,000,000^{^}
^{^} Shipments figures based on certification alone.
