= Donald Trump and religion =

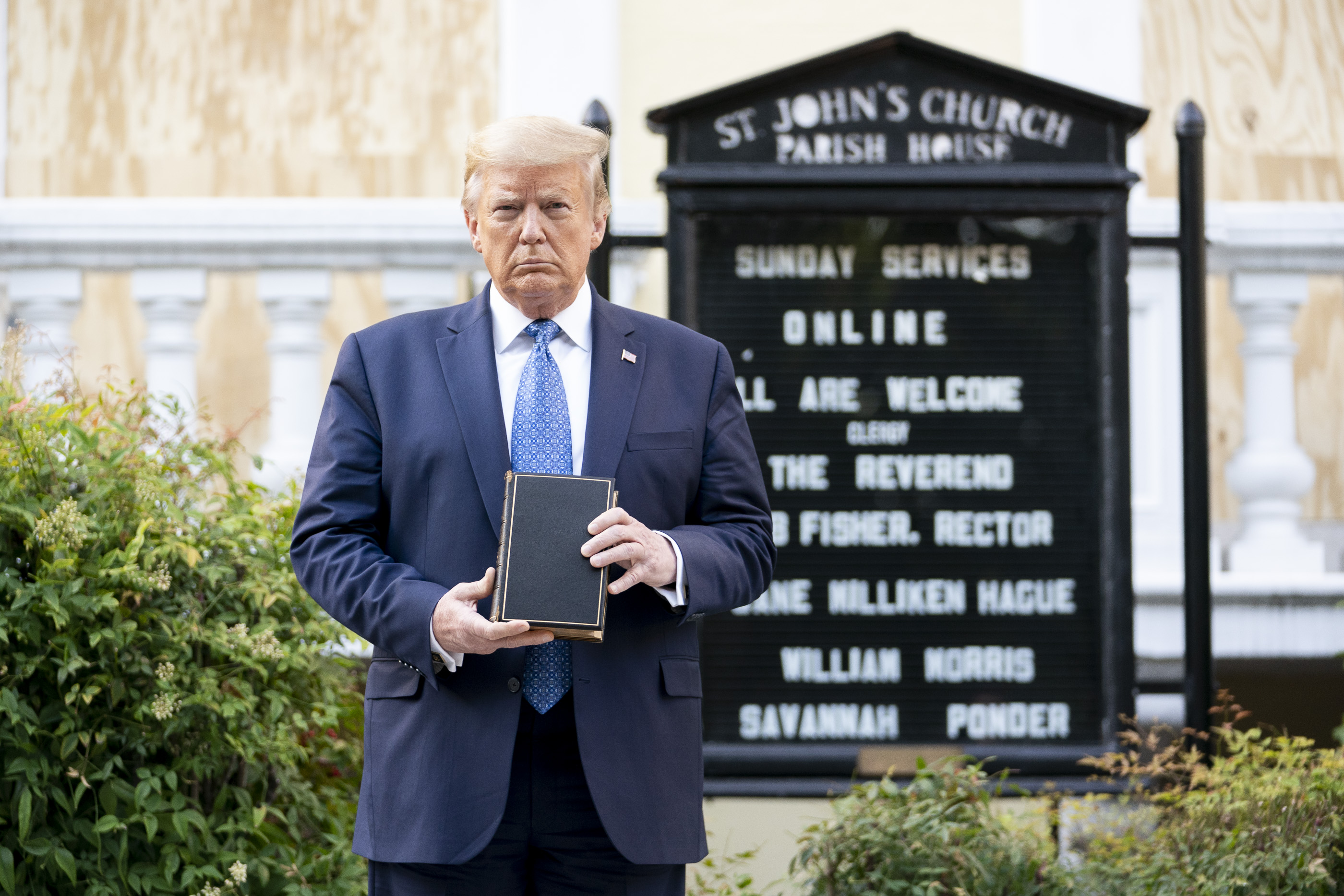
Donald Trump held a copy of the Bible outside St. John's Episcopal Church, Lafayette Square, in June 2020 following a controversial removal of protestors.

The religious views of Donald Trump, the 45th and 47th president of the United States, has been a matter for discussion. While identifying as a Christian, historians, journalists, and theologians describe his theology as drastically diverging from that of mainstream Christianity, particularly during his second presidency. Since 2025, Trump has expressed doubt if he will go to Heaven, rejected several teachings of Jesus, and that he would not repent of his sins.

Trump was raised in his Scottish-born mother's Presbyterian faith, and identified with the denomination for a majority of his adult life, including during his 2016 presidential campaign. However, in October 2020, Trump declared that he no longer identified as Presbyterian and now considered himself a nondenominational Christian. Through his personal relationships he has been identified with Pealeism and charismatic Christianity. Trump historically attended Marble Collegiate Church under Norman Vincent Peale, whose emphasis on a positive mental attitude shaped Trump.

Throughout his political career Trump has made appeals to conservative Christianity and the Christian right, particularly evangelicals, and said in 2016 that he has "great relationships" with Christian ministers. He has had a long association with Paula White-Cain, a charismatic minister whom he has called his "personal pastor" and whose prosperity theology aligns with his outlook. White delivered the invocation prayer at Trump's first inauguration and joined the White House staff in 2019 to work on religious outreach issues. The fusion of political Christianity with Trump's own views has been described as "Christian Trumpism". Despite his outreach to the above, Trump's staunchest Christian support would come from those who identified as Pentecostal and charismatic, and is credited with mainstreaming their theology in politics, having historically been alienated by the mainstream Christian right. After 2020, Trump increasingly embraced Christian nationalism in rhetoric and imagery, selling Bibles, framing his campaigns as spiritual battles, and creating a federal task force on anti-Christian discrimination.

Scholars and the public have questioned his self-professed religious affiliations. A survey during Trump's first presidency (2017–2021) showed that 63% of Americans did not believe he was religious, despite his professed Christian affiliation, and only 44% believed that Trump was a Christian. Trump's various comments on the Bible and Christian practice have led observers to suggest that his knowledge of Christianity is superficial or erroneous, and biographers generally do not describe Trump as particularly religious. Most scholars and biographers have described his mentions of faith as a political tool rather than a sincere spiritual commitment. He does not regularly attend church services.

== Beliefs and background ==
Theologians, historians, and journalists describe his theology as drastically diverging from that of mainstream Christianity, particularly during his second presidential term. Since 2025, Trump has repeatedly expressed doubt if he will go to Heaven, openly rejected several teachings of Jesus, and said that he would not repent of his sins.

=== History ===
Trump's parents, Fred and Mary Anne Trump, were parishioners of the First Presbyterian Church in Jamaica, Queens. It was in this church that Trump attended Sunday school and was confirmed into the Presbyterian Church (USA) in 1959. The choice of church appears to have been influenced by his mother's Scottish heritage; his father, who was of German descent, had been raised Lutheran. In the 1970s, Trump and his parents began attending Marble Collegiate Church, at that time led by the well-known pastor Norman Vincent Peale, and he maintained ties to that congregation for much of the following 50 years. Fred Trump embraced Peale’s insistence that God granted one a positive inner vision as a gift of grace, which if received and acted on, would lead to success in life; failing to do so was sinful and could result in poverty, which he would raise his children in. Trump has cited Peale's philosophy as a major influence and described him as a mentor, an assertion supported by biographers, if in a more general than strictly religious sense. His first marriage, to Ivana Zelníčková in 1977, took place at Marble Collegiate, and was officiated by Peale. In 1988, Trump served as a co-host of Peale's 90th birthday celebrations, hosted at the Waldorf Astoria. Trump would go on to cite Peale's oratorical prowess and clarity of vision as influences. Peale, in turn, described Trump as "one of America's top positive thinkers and doers" and predicted that he would be "the greatest builder of our time." Trump's second marriage, to Marla Maples in 1993, was officiated by Arthur Caliandro, Peale's successor at Marble Collegiate.

In 1997, a Playboy profile described him as “not a religious man.” When asked by reporter Glenn Plaskin if he was concerned about his mortality, Trump answered that, "I'm fatalistic, and I protect myself as well as anybody can. I prepare for things. But ultimately we all end up going." He also said, "I don't believe in reincarnation, heaven or hell — but we go someplace."

In 1999 Trump told Today he felt “there's a difference between believing in God and organized religion," explaining that "the belief in God is more important than organized religion. But I think organized religion's important in that it keeps people in the straight and narrow."

Trump was also a consistent viewer of televangelists Jimmy Swaggart, Billy Graham, David Jeremiah, and singer Bill Gaither.

He became acquainted with Paula White in 2002 after watching her sermon, The Value of Vision. She taught the audience to have an executable vision for life, achieved through goal setting, discipline, faith in God, diligence, and sound management. He appreciated her informal approach to preaching and emphasis of personal purpose, victory, overcoming demonic influences, and Jesus’s understanding of human nature. She would become the effecive chaplain for the Trump family and The Trump Ogranization, praying for them, recommending readings, and counselling them based on her discernment of God’s intentions. Trump is also inclined towards her broader Christian movement’s cultural values of anti-intellectualism, messianism, prosperity theology, and Zionism.

In 2016, during an interview with Cal Thomas, Trump described Jesus as someone he can “think about for security and confidence. Somebody I can revere in terms of bravery and in terms of courage and, because I consider the Christian religion so important, somebody I can totally rely on in my own mind.”

On December 21, 2021, he said during a Christmas address at the First Baptist Church in Dallas, Texas that “Our country needs a Savior right now. And our country has a Savior - and it's not me… That's somebody else much higher up than me. Much higher,” referring to Jesus.

== First presidency ==
In 2015, Trump stated that his favorite book was the Bible, but declined to offer his favorite verse, stating that it's "very personal". In 2016, he said his favorite verse was "An Eye for an Eye". In 2015, during the Family Leadership Summit, Frank Luntz asked Trump if he'd ever asked God for forgiveness; Trump responded, "I'm not sure I have. I just go and try to do a better job from there. I don't think so. I think if I do something wrong, I think I just try and make it right. I don't bring God into that picture. I don't." In a January 2016 speech to evangelicals, Trump referred to Second Corinthians as "Two Corinthians", while speaking at a Liberty University commencement, attracting much press attention and questions about his understanding of Scripture.

He said in 2015 that he still attended Marble Collegiate Church, a congregation of the Reformed Church in America and the United Church of Christ; the church said in a statement to CNN that he "is not an active member"; Peale's son said that he had not seen Trump at the church for "several years". He said that he was a Presbyterian and a Protestant in 2016. In October 2020, however, in an interview with the Religion News Service, responding to a question on whether he considered himself an evangelical Christian, Trump stated that he no longer considered himself a Presbyterian and now identified as a non-denominational Christian. Trump mentioned that he had spent the past few years getting to "visit some amazing churches and meet with great faith leaders from around the world", and in particular had "tuned into several virtual church services" during the COVID-19 pandemic, suggesting that this had contributed to the change in his views.

Most of Trump's biographers, along with other associates, have not described him as especially devout. Timothy O'Brien said that Trump "has never been a spiritually or religiously serious person". Scott Black Johnston, senior pastor of Fifth Avenue Presbyterian Church in New York City, described Trump as coming across as someone who had "not spent a lot of time exploring the faith", after meeting with him for a prayer meeting shortly after his victory in 2016. Trump was not known to attend church regularly either before or after becoming president, but did attend holiday services at the Episcopal Church of Bethesda-by-the-Sea in Palm Beach, near his Mar-a-Lago residence, where he was married to his third wife, Melania Knauss, in 2005. Terry Eastland of the Washington Examiner said that Trump was "not one to dig much beyond the surface of things religious, much less parse doctrine and guard the deposit of faith". Even Trump's close associate Paula White said that it would be "futile" for Trump to try to publicly discuss his faith. An exception was the 2018 book The Faith of Donald J. Trump, co-authored by David Brody and Scott Lamb, a "spiritual biography" which sought to cast Trump as someone with a deeply, albeit "unarticulated", Christian worldview. The book was widely derided by reviewers as "ridiculous", "mind-bending", and "Christian homeopathy".

== Second presidency ==
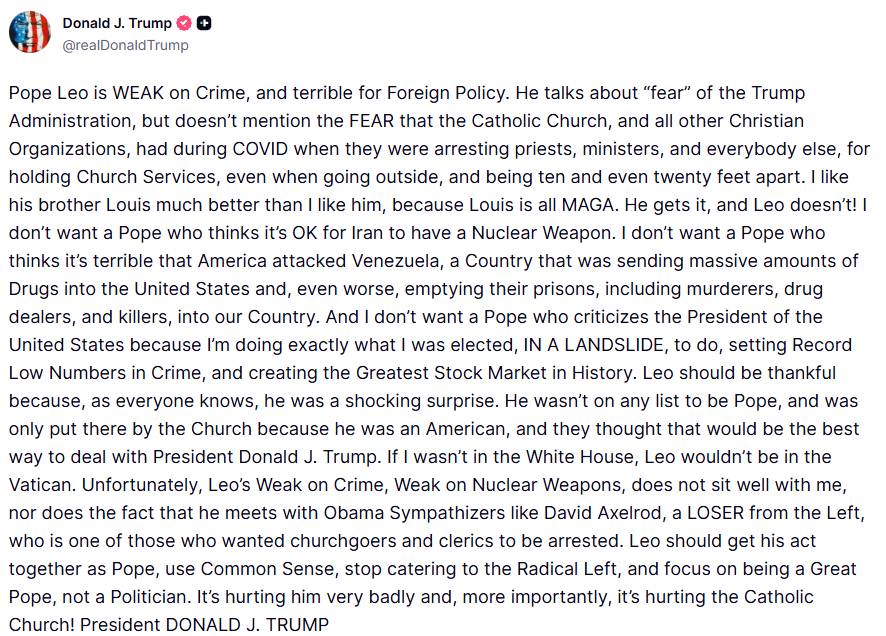
Trump's April 12, 2026, Truth Social post on Pope Leo XIV

In 2024, Trump began to sell special editions of the King James Version of the Bible that contained copies of the founding documents of the United States, known as the God Bless the U.S.A. Bible. Trump has a personal collection of Bibles.

In June 2024, Trump endorsed a law for displaying the Ten Commandments in schools, both in a speech to evangelical Christians on June 22, 2024 and in a post on Truth Social.

Following an attempt on his life in Pennsylvania in July 2024, in which he was shot in the ear, and one in Florida two months later, Trump stated: "God has now spared my life not once, but twice".

Trump wove Christian religious imagery into his successful 2024 presidential campaign, characterizing it as a "righteous crusade" against "atheists, globalists and the Marxists". He stated that his aims included restoring the United States "as one nation under God with liberty and justice for all". Trump has stated that the United States is a "nation of believers". Trump's rallies took on the symbols, rhetoric and agenda of Christian nationalism. Trump maintains positive relations with the New Apostolic Reformation, whose figures promote pro-Trump policies and are influential within the Trump administration.

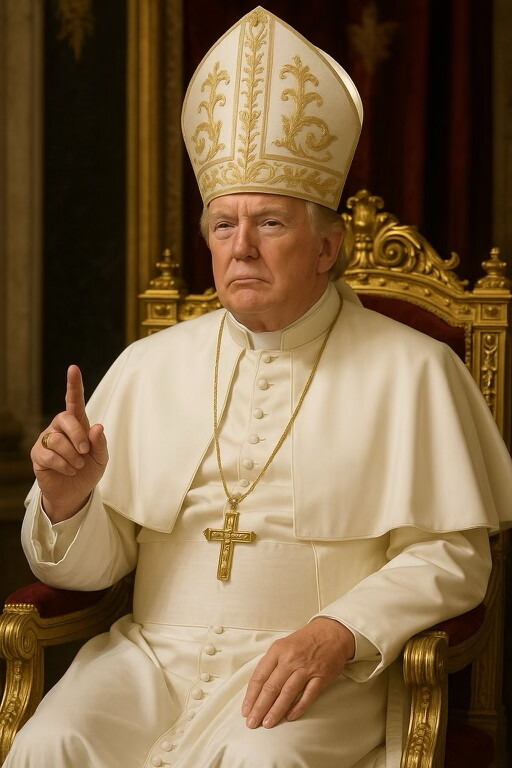
This image, posted by Trump, features him wearing a white cassock and pointed mitre, traditionally worn by a bishop. He wears a large cross around his neck, and has his finger held up, with a solemn facial expression.

On January 21, 2025, the Episcopal bishop Mariann Budde addressed Trump during an inaugural prayer service, asking him to show mercy to immigrants, refugees, and the LGBTQ community. After the service, Trump disparaged Budde as a "so-called Bishop" and a "radical Left hard line Trump hater", and demanded an apology from Budde and the Episcopal Church.

Trump has supported a narrative that Christians are being persecuted within the United States. On February 6, following the National Prayer Breakfast, he signed an executive order to create a task force to "immediately halt all forms of anti-Christian targeting and discrimination within the federal government, including at the Department of Justice, which was absolutely terrible, the IRS, the FBI — terrible — and other agencies". Donald Trump appointed Attorney General Pam Bondi to lead the task force and appointed Paula White to direct the White House Faith Office.

On December 16, 2025, during a White House Hanukkah reception, conservative commentator Mark Levin referred to Donald Trump as the "first Jewish president," citing Trump's strong support for Israel and the Jewish community. Trump responded affirmatively, replying "It's true," and again acknowledged the remark when Levin jokingly added that he was "the first Jewish president to serve two non-consecutive presidencies."

On Easter Day 2026 (April 5), Trump sparked significant controversy by using the phrase "Praise be to Allah" in his expletive-laden post threatening Iran, which was interpreted by critics as mocking Islam or weaponizing religious language during as part of the conflict. The phrase was used while demanding the reopening of the Strait of Hormuz and boasting about military actions against Iran. Iran ridiculed his ultimatum, dismissing it as "helpless, nervous and stupid".

=== Comparisons to religious figures ===
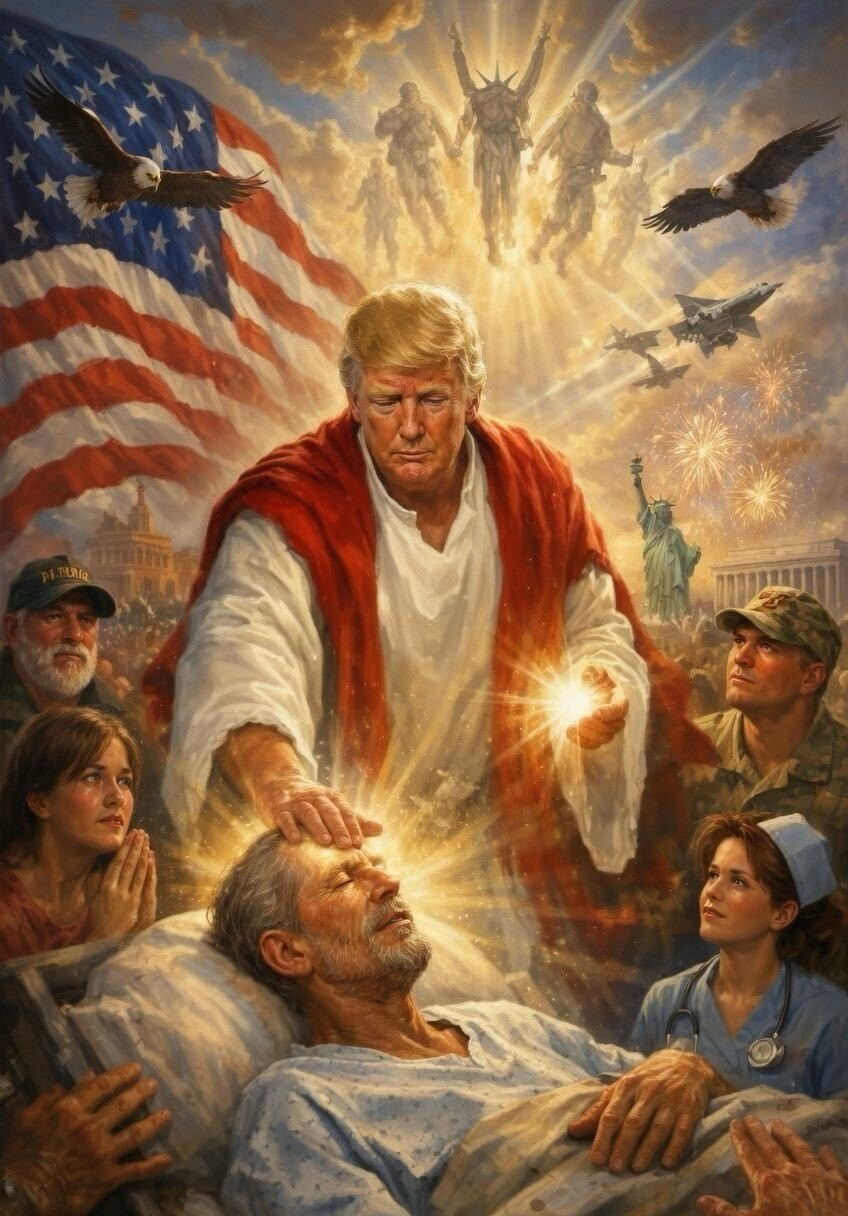
Trump posted this image to his Truth Social account on April 12, 2026. After criticism, the post was deleted hours later.

After posting an AI-generated image of himself as pope during the 2025 conclave on his official Truth Social account, Trump was criticized by many Catholics, including the New York State Catholic Conference and Matteo Renzi, former Prime Minister of Italy. After being asked about the criticism by a reporter, Trump responded, "The Catholics loved it," and claimed that he had nothing to do with the picture and did not know where it came from.

On April 1, 2026, Trump and his spiritual advisor Paula White-Cain compared him to Jesus Christ. Trump stated, "On Palm Sunday, Jesus entered Jerusalem as crowds welcomed him with praise honoring him as king. They call me king now. Can you believe it?". White-Cain compared Trump's criminal controversies to Christ's persecution, claiming "[Trump was] betrayed and arrested and falsely accused. It's a familiar pattern that Our Lord and savior showed us." Video of Trump's self-comparison was removed from the White House website.

On April 13, 2026, Trump stated that he did upload the Jesus image and that he thought it depicted him as a doctor.

A week later, on Orthodox Easter, Trump posted a picture of himself on Truth Social depicted as Jesus, drawing widespread criticism from Evangelicals and Catholics, resulting in Trump deleting the post hours later. Earlier that day Trump had publicly criticized Pope Leo XIV. Trump later claimed he believed he was depicted as a doctor in the image, and any reporting that he was depicted as Jesus Christ was "fake news".

Trump's religious AI images, combined with his actions towards both Iran and the Vatican, have been divisive even among his own voters, with some renouncing their support and instead accusing Trump of being the Antichrist.

=== Heaven ===
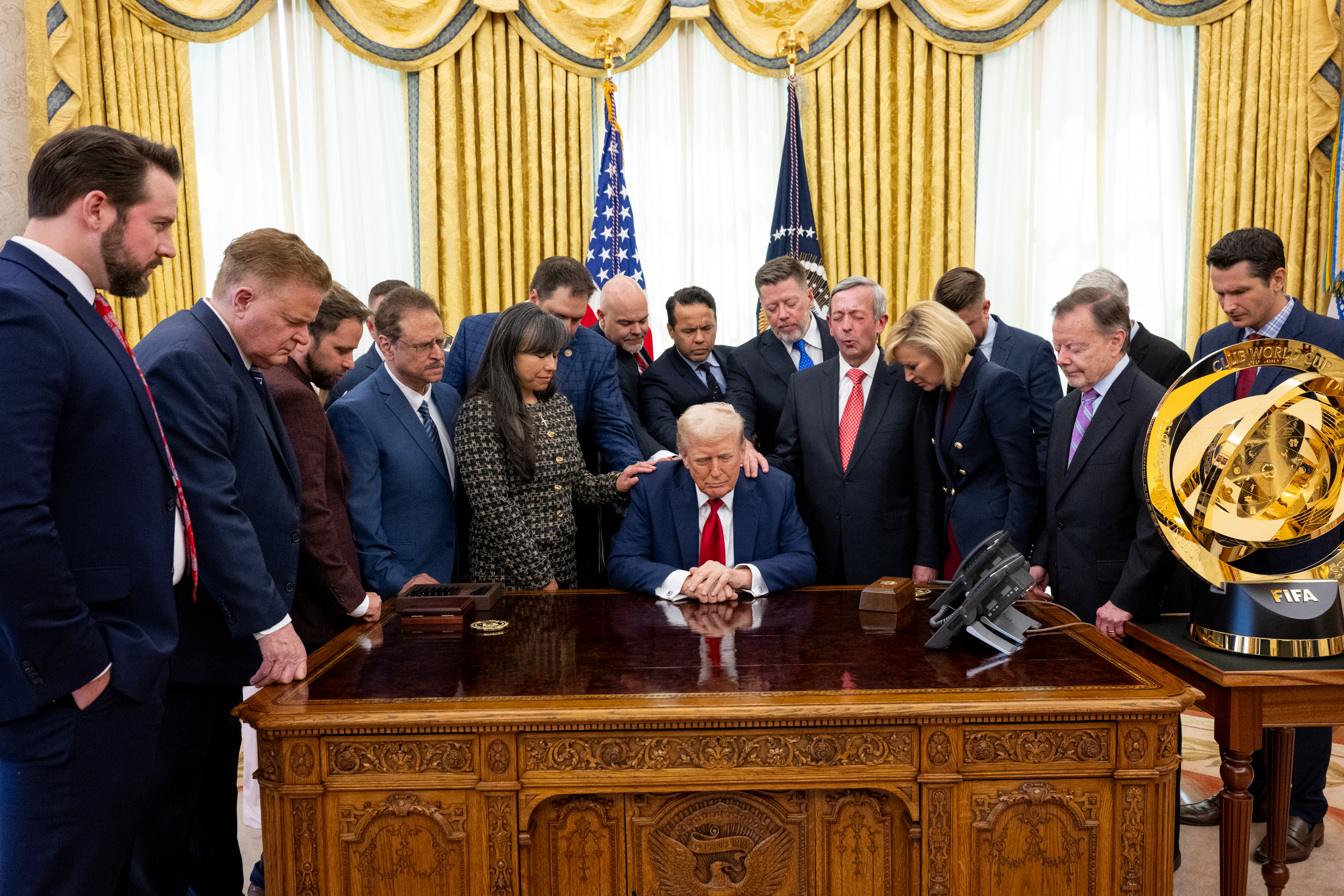
Trump meets with Faith Leaders from across the country to pray in the Oval Office, March 19, 2025

In a speech to Madison Square Garden in 2024, Trump stated that he was "not 100% sure" if his father was in Heaven. Since the start of his second presidency, Trump has repeatedly expressed skepticism if he will go to Heaven. During negotiations to end the Russo-Ukrainian War in August 2025, Trump remarked that "I want to try and get to Heaven, if possible. I'm hearing I'm not doing well. I am really at the bottom of the totem pole." In a donation drive email from September, Trump asked for donations so he could "get to Heaven." On October 7, 2025, Trump proclaimed that going to Heaven is "very important" to him, explaining that "there's no reason to be good" otherwise. Five days later, in response to a reporter's question on if the enactment of the Gaza peace plan would help him get into Heaven, Trump replied "I don't think there's anything going to get me in Heaven. I think I'm not maybe Heaven-bound ... I'm not sure I'm going to be able to make Heaven, but I've made life a lot better for a lot of people".

In February 2026, addressing the National Prayer Breakfast, Trump acknowledged that he previously claimed that he was "never going to make it to Heaven," but walked back his previous remarks as sarcasm. He expressed his belief that he "probably should make it" to Heaven, affirming that he is "not a perfect candidate, but I did a hell of a lot of good for perfect people." Later that month, he reaffirmed that his prior remarks were in jest, stating, "I was just having fun. I hope to make it, but I doubt I will." In March 2026, Trump shared a letter written by Franklin Graham, where Graham acknowledged Trump's doubts and reassured Trump that his "soul is secure and will spend eternity in the presence of God." In a November 2026 interview with 60 Minutes, Trump stated that while he hopes to go to heaven, if faced with forgiving some of his opponents as a condition for entry to heaven, "I hate some of my enemies and always will."

== Using faith as a political tool ==
On August 21, 2019, while gaggling with reporters at the White House, President Trump proclaims "I am the chosen one" and looks up at the sky.

Trump's religious rhetoric has often been described as transactional, focusing more on reinforcing his image as a strong leader than on genuine spiritual beliefs. Unlike past U.S. presidents who openly discussed their personal spiritual struggles, Trump has largely avoided theological discussions, instead emphasizing success, power, and dominance. His reluctance to discuss themes of humility, repentance, or service—which are central to Christianity—has led some critics to argue that his faith is more of a political tool than a guiding principle.

His close association with leaders of the Prosperity Gospel movement, such as the televangelist and Trump's spiritual advisor, Paula White, further supports this perspective. The Prosperity Gospel equates wealth and success with divine favor, a message that aligns with Trump's self-presentation as a successful businessman and a strong leader. Many evangelical leaders, including Franklin Graham and Jerry Falwell Jr., have defended Trump's moral failings by arguing that God can use imperfect people for his purposes, a justification that blends religious faith with political pragmatism.

== See also ==
- Trump Muslim ban
- Donald Trump and antisemitism
- Donald Trump and Islamophobia
- Religious affiliations of presidents of the United States
