= Somebody's Gonna Love You (album) =

Studio album by Lee Greenwood
- Released: March 3, 1983
- Genre: Country
- Length: 33:07
- Label: MCA
- Producer: Jerry Crutchfield

Lee Greenwood chronology
Inside Out (1982)	Somebody's Gonna Love You (1983)	You've Got a Good Love Comin' (1984)

Professional ratings
Review scores
Source	Rating
AllMusic	2.5/5 stars

Somebody's Gonna Love You is the second studio album by American country music singer Lee Greenwood, released on March 3, 1983 by MCA Records. It was certified Gold.

== Track listing ==
No.	Title	Writer(s)	Length
1.	"I.O.U."	Kerry Chater, Austin Roberts	3:05
2.	"Somebody's Gonna Love You"	Rafe Van Hoy, Don Cook	3:42
3.	"Going, Going, Gone"	Jan Crutchfield	3:19
4.	"Call It What You Want To (It's Still Love)"	Keith Palmer	3:00
5.	"Barely Holding On"	Jan Crutchfield, Jerry Crutchfield	2:51
6.	"Love Won't Let Us Say Goodbye"	Jan Crutchfield, Paul Harrison	3:05
7.	"Ladies Love"	Pat McManus, Woody Bomar	3:10
8.	"The Wind Beneath My Wings"	Jeff Silbar, Larry Henley	3:55
9.	"Think About the Good Times"	Barry Richards, Bobby Hart, Freddie Aguliar	3:19
10.	"Someone Who Remembers"	Glen Ballard, Kerry Chater, Rory Bourke	3:41

== Personnel ==
- Pete Bordonali - electric guitar
- David Briggs - keyboards
- Carol Chase - background vocals
- Doug Clements - background vocals
- Steve Gibson - acoustic guitar
- Richard Greene - fiddle
- Lee Greenwood - lead vocals
- Sherilyn Huffman - background vocals
- David Hungate - bass guitar
- Larrie Londin - drums
- Weldon Myrick - steel guitar
- Hargus "Pig" Robbins - piano
- Jerry Shook - electric guitar
- Lisa Silver - background vocals
- Andy Statman - mandolin
- James Stroud - drums
- Diane Tidwell - background vocals
- Pete Wade - electric guitar
- Jack Williams - bass guitar
- Dennis Wilson - background vocals
- Reggie Young - electric guitar

== Charts ==
=== Weekly charts ===
Chart (1983)	Peak position
US Billboard 200	73
US Top Country Albums (Billboard)	3

=== Year-end charts ===
Chart (1983)	Position
US Top Country Albums (Billboard)	16
Chart (1984)	Position
US Top Country Albums (Billboard)	12

== Certifications ==
Region	Certification	Certified units/sales
United States (RIAA)	Gold	500,000^{^}
^{^} Shipments figures based on certification alone.
