= Inside Out (Lee Greenwood album) =

Studio album by Lee Greenwood
- Released: April 1, 1982
- Genre: Country
- Length: 32:58
- Label: MCA
- Producer: Jerry Crutchfield

Lee Greenwood chronology
Inside Out (1982)	Somebody's Gonna Love You (1983)

Professional ratings
Review scores
Source	Rating
AllMusic	4/5 stars

Inside Out is the debut studio album by American country music singer Lee Greenwood, released in 1982. It was certified gold.

== Track listing ==
No.	Title	Writer(s)	Length
1.	"A Love Song"	Lee Greenwood	3:25
2.	"Ring on Her Finger, Time on Her Hands"	Don Goodman, Mary Ann Kennedy, Pam Rose	3:38
3.	"I Don't Want to Be a Memory"	Greenwood, Aaron Wilburn	3:03
4.	"Ain't No Trick (It Takes Magic)"	Jim Hurt, Steve Pippin	3:22
5.	"It Turns Me Inside Out"	Jan Crutchfield	3:34
6.	"She's Lying"	Jan Crutchfield	3:05
7.	"Home Away from Home"	Greenwood	2:55
8.	"Love Don't Get No Better Than This"	Jan Crutchfield	3:32
9.	"Thank You for Changing My Life"	Greenwood	3:04
10.	"Broken Pieces of My Heart"	Jan Crutchfield	3:20

== Personnel ==
- Pete Bordanali - guitar
- Jerry Carrigan - drums
- Phil Forrest - background vocals
- Steve Gibson - guitar
- Greg Gordon - background vocals
- Lee Greenwood - lead vocals
- Sheri Huffman - background vocals
- The Nashville String Machine - strings
- Farrell Morris - percussion
- Weldon Myrick - steel guitar
- Hargus "Pig" Robbins - piano
- Steve Schaffer - bass guitar
- Billy Sanford - guitar
- Jerry Shook - guitar
- Lisa Silver - background vocals
- Larry Stewart - background vocals
- The Sheldon Kurland Strings - strings
- Diane Tidwell - background vocals
- Pete Wade - guitar
- Bergen White - background vocals, string arrangements
- Jack Williams - bass guitar

== Charts ==
=== Weekly charts ===
Chart (1982)	Peak position
US Top Country Albums (Billboard)	12

=== Year-end charts ===
Chart (1982)	Position
US Top Country Albums (Billboard)	31
Chart (1983)	Position
US Top Country Albums (Billboard)	40

== Certifications ==
Region	Certification	Certified units/sales
United States (RIAA)	Gold	500,000^{^}
^{^} Shipments figures based on certification alone.
