= Trump bible controversy =

Trump bible controversy may refer to:

- Donald Trump photo op at St. John's Church, 2020 controversial presidential photo op
- God Bless the U.S.A. Bible, criticism surrounding the bible endorsed by Trump
