= You've Got a Good Love Comin' =

Album by Lee Greenwood

Studio album by Lee Greenwood
- Released: May 17, 1984
- Genre: Country
- Length: 32:31
- Label: MCA
- Producer: Jerry Crutchfield

Lee Greenwood chronology
| Somebody's Gonna Love You (1983) | You've Got a Good Love Comin' (1984) | Meant for Each Other (1984) |

Professional ratings
Review scores
| Source | Rating |
|---|---|
| Allmusic | 2.5/5 stars |

You've Got a Good Love Comin' is the third studio album by American country music artist Lee Greenwood, released in 1984. It was certified Gold.

== Track listing ==
| No. | Title | Writer(s) | Length |
|---|---|---|---|
| 1. | "You've Got a Good Love Comin'" | Danny Morrison, Jeff Silbar, Van Stephenson | 2:53 |
| 2. | "(I Found) Love in Time" | Glen Ballard, Clif Magness | 4:08 |
| 3. | "I Don't Want to Wake You" | Wayland Holyfield, Peter McCann | 3:13 |
| 4. | "Love Me Like I'm Leavin' Tonight" | Pat Bunch, Mary Ann Kennedy, Pam Rose | 3:28 |
| 5. | "Worth It for the Ride" | Jerry Crutchfield, Lee Greenwood | 2:48 |
| 6. | "Two Heart Serenade" | Michael Clark | 3:45 |
| 7. | "Fool's Gold" | Timmy Tappan, Don Roth | 3:42 |
| 8. | "Lean, Mean, Lovin' Machine" | Don Cook, Rafe Van Hoy | 2:38 |
| 9. | "Even Love Can't Save Us Now" | Fred Burch, Jan Crutchfield, Paul Harrison | 2:47 |
| 10. | "God Bless the U.S.A." | Greenwood | 3:09 |

== Personnel ==
Adapted from liner notes.

- Pete Bordonali - acoustic guitar (tracks 4, 7, 9), electric guitar (tracks 1, 6, 8, 10)
- David Briggs - piano (tracks 3, 7, 9)
- Jerry Carrigan - drums (track 5)
- Steve Gibson - acoustic guitar (tracks 1, 2, 4–6, 8, 10)
- Vince Gill - background vocals (tracks 1, 7)
- Greg Gordon - background vocals (tracks 1, 6, 7)
- Lee Greenwood - lead vocals (all tracks)
- David Hungate - bass guitar (tracks 1–3, 6, 8, 10)
- David Innis - keyboards (tracks 2, 3)
- Shane Keister - keyboards (track 5), piano (track 4)
- Sheri Kramer - background vocals (tracks 4, 9)
- The Nashville String Machine - strings (tracks 3, 4, 7, 9)
- Bobby Ogdin - keyboards (tracks 1, 6, 8, 10)
- Cindy Richardson - background vocals (tracks 8, 10)
- Hargus "Pig" Robbins - piano (tracks 1, 8, 10)
- Brent Rowan - electric guitar (track 3)
- Lisa Silver - background vocals (tracks 4, 8–10)
- James Stroud - drums (all tracks except 5)
- Diane Tidwell - background vocals (tracks 4, 8–10)
- Pete Wade - electric guitar (tracks 4, 5)
- Bergen White - string arrangements (tracks 3, 4, 7, 9)
- Jack Williams - bass guitar (tracks 4, 5, 7, 9)
- Dennis Wilson - background vocals (tracks 1, 6, 7)
- Reggie Young - electric guitar (tracks 6, 7, 9)

== Charts ==
=== Weekly charts ===
| Chart (1984) | Peak position |
|---|---|
| Canada Country Albums (RPM) | 15 |
| US Billboard 200 | 150 |
| US Top Country Albums (Billboard) | 6 |

=== Year-end charts ===
| Chart (1984) | Position |
|---|---|
| US Top Country Albums (Billboard) | 36 |
| Chart (1985) | Position |
| US Top Country Albums (Billboard) | 27 |

== Certifications ==
| Region | Certification | Certified units/sales |
|---|---|---|
| United States (RIAA) | Gold | 500,000^{^} |
^{^} Shipments figures based on certification alone.
