= Donald Trump and antisemitism =

Trump states in the White House on August 20, 2019, "I think any Jewish people that vote for a Democrat, I think it shows either a total lack of knowledge or great disloyalty."

Donald Trump, the 45th and 47th president of the United States, has a history of speech and actions that are viewed by some scholars, Jewish organizations, and news agencies as antisemitic. and fostering a political climate that is hospitable to antisemites.

Opinion polls of American Jews have found that a majority regard Trump as antisemitic and disapprove of his antisemitism policies.

== Accusations of antisemitism ==
=== Antisemitic tropes and threats ===
According to former Trump Plaza Hotel and Casino president John O'Donnell, in the 1990s, Trump said, "Black guys counting my money! I hate it. The only kind of people I want counting my money are little short guys that wear yarmulkes every day."

During Trump's 2016 campaign for president, The Times of Israel published a timeline of his antisemitic "controversies", including remarks he made to the Republican Jewish Coalition invoking tropes about Jews and money. In his first presidency, he was accused of espousing antisemitism on numerous occasions. In a speech at the Israeli-American Council in 2019, Trump referenced classic antisemitic tropes in his appeal to Jewish voters. Yair Rosenberg wrote in August 2019 for The Washington Post, "Trump believes all the anti-Semitic stereotypes about Jews. But he sees those traits as admirable." Rosenberg said this reflected that Trump is both antisemitic and philosemitic.

Discourse around Trump's relationship with Judaism in America was revived later in his first presidency. In October 2022, Trump called for American Jews to "appreciate Israel before it's too late", aligning with his past claims that American Jews no longer love Israel.

The New York Times has accused the Trump administration of using antisemitic imagery, tropes, and dog whistles in campaign emails, including references to George Soros conspiracy theories, images of money mixed with Stars of David, and terminology such as "globalists" and "cabal".

In a speech on July 3, 2025, Trump said, "Think of that: No death tax. No estate tax. No going to the banks and borrowing from, in some cases, a fine banker – and in some cases, Shylocks and bad people", invoking the trope of Jews as greedy moneylenders. On October 19, 2026, Trump said in a Kansas election rally for Senator Roger Marshall that reports made the senator "some kind of a shylock-type guy".

Trump has also been an outspoken critic of pro-Palestinian and anti-Israel sentiment in the United States, including on college campuses, which he characterizes as antisemitic, and has signed two executive orders to counter antisemitism and anti-Zionism. Critics have alleged that Trump has views that are simultaneously pro-Israel and antisemitic.

=== Jewish voters who support Democrats "disloyal" ===
On August 20, 2019, after a reporter asked "Should there be any change in U.S. aid to Israel?", Donald Trump stated within his answer, "And I think any Jewish people that vote for a Democrat, I think it shows either a total lack of knowledge or great disloyalty." Trump counterposed the Democratic Party to the Republican Party, which he represented. The utterance caused outrage, shock, and disdain from Jewish leaders and citizens in the United States. They claimed that the president was perpetuating antisemitic stereotypes. Democratic presidential candidate Bernie Sanders responded at a campaign rally in Iowa City, Iowa, "I am a proud Jewish person, and I have no concerns about voting Democratic. And, in fact, I intend to vote for a Jewish man to become the next president of the United States."

=== Dinner with Nick Fuentes and Kanye West ===
On November 22, 2022, Trump had a private dinner at Mar-a-Lago with Ye (formerly known as Kanye West), who brought Nick Fuentes along with him. Fuentes is a prominent Holocaust denier and antisemite, and Ye had made widely reported antisemitic comments during the months before the dinner. Trump later stated that he had not known of Fuentes's beliefs; however, in discussing the dinner, Trump did not condemn his guests' antisemitism. Both Republicans and Democrats criticized his choice to dine with them.

=== Claim that Jewish Democrats hate Israel and their religion ===
On March 18, 2024, Trump was criticized for claiming "any Jewish person that votes for Democrats hates their religion", and that "they hate everything about Israel, and they should be ashamed of themselves because Israel will be destroyed". Following mounting criticism from Jewish groups, Trump's campaign responded that "Trump is right" and that the Democratic Party "has turned into a full-blown anti-Israel, antisemitic, pro-terrorist cabal". Jonathan Greenblatt of the Anti-Defamation League called Trump's comments "defamatory and patently false". Chief executive Amy Spitalnick of the Jewish Council for Public Affairs claimed that Trump was "further normalizing dangerous antisemites". Trump's claims were accused of evoking an antisemitic trope that Jews have a 'dual loyalty' and are more loyal to Israel than to their own countries. Trump's comments echoed previous comments he made during his presidency by accusing Jews who vote for Democrats as "disloyal". Following his initial comments on March 18, Trump repeatedly accused Jews who voted or intended to vote for Joe Biden of betraying their religious and cultural identities.

Kamala Harris's campaign and several non-partisan Jewish organizations criticized Trump's comments during an antisemitism conference on September 19 where he stated that "if I don't win this election" then "the Jewish people would have a lot to do with a loss" and continued criticizing liberal Jews for "voting for the enemy" by claiming the Democratic party had a "hold, or curse" on Jewish Americans.

=== Jewish voters to blame if Trump lost election ===
In September 2024, at an event dedicated to countering antisemitism, Donald Trump complained about his lack of support among Jewish voters and stated that Jewish voters would be substantially to blame if he lost the 2024 presidential election, saying that "I'm not going to call this a prediction, but, in my opinion, the Jewish people would have a lot to do with a loss if I'm at 40%." In response, Doug Emhoff, the husband of Kamala Harris, said that Trump had "once again fanned the flames of antisemitism by trafficking in tropes blaming and scapegoating Jews." ADL chief Jonathan Greenblatt said that Trump had undermined his own message against antisemitism by "employing numerous antisemitic tropes and anti-Jewish stereotypes", including the accusation of dual loyalty.

=== Denying Chuck Schumer's Jewishness ===
In March 2025, Trump made comments denying the Jewishness of Chuck Schumer, the leader of the Democrats in the United States Senate: "As far as I'm concerned, he's become a Palestinian. He used to be Jewish. He's not Jewish any more. He's a Palestinian." Trump's remarks were condemned by rights groups as antisemitic and anti-Palestinian. In response, Schumer alleged that Trump "does not do enough to combat antisemitism...even though I don't think he's antisemitic himself."

=== Accusations of antisemitism by Trump ===
In a Hanukkah speech to his Jewish supporters in 2025, Trump lamented that the "Jewish lobby" or "Israel lobby" was declining in influence and claimed that Congress was "becoming antisemitic" and singled out the "Squad" members, claiming in particular that Rep. Ilhan Omar "hates Jewish people". He also claimed the universities stoked anti-Israel sentiment and boasted that they "will pay a lot of money" in settlements.

=== Frustration towards Jewish voters ===
In November 2026, after the 2026 United States elections in which Democratic senate candidate Abdul El-Sayed won the electoral race in Michigan, Trump recognized that El-Sayed won a majority of Jewish voters but claimed confusion over the outcome, calling them a "tough group to get".

=== Poll of Jewish voters ===
In a May 2025 poll of registered US voters who are Jewish, 52% viewed Trump as somewhat or very antisemitic. Sixty-four percent disapproved of Trump's efforts to combat antisemitism, compared to 36% who approved.

=== Response of Jewish organizations ===
In 2025, former Anti-Defamation League chief Abraham Foxman denounced the ADL and its new chief Jonathan Greenblatt as well as other Jewish organizations and figures for an allegedly muted response to antisemitism within the Trump administration and among Trump supporters, comparing the response to Stockholm syndrome. Regarding the 2024 Donald Trump rally at Madison Square Garden, Foxman stated that "There's no question about it: For the American Jewish Committee, the ADL, Conference of Presidents, the federations, all these institutions, if this happened six months ago, they would be out there condemning racism and antisemitism and hate speech." The ADL in 2026 posted a statement condemning usage of the slur "shylock" but drew criticism from commenters, who pointed out that it did not call out Trump by name for his usage of it in his October rally.

== Executive orders to counter antisemitism ==
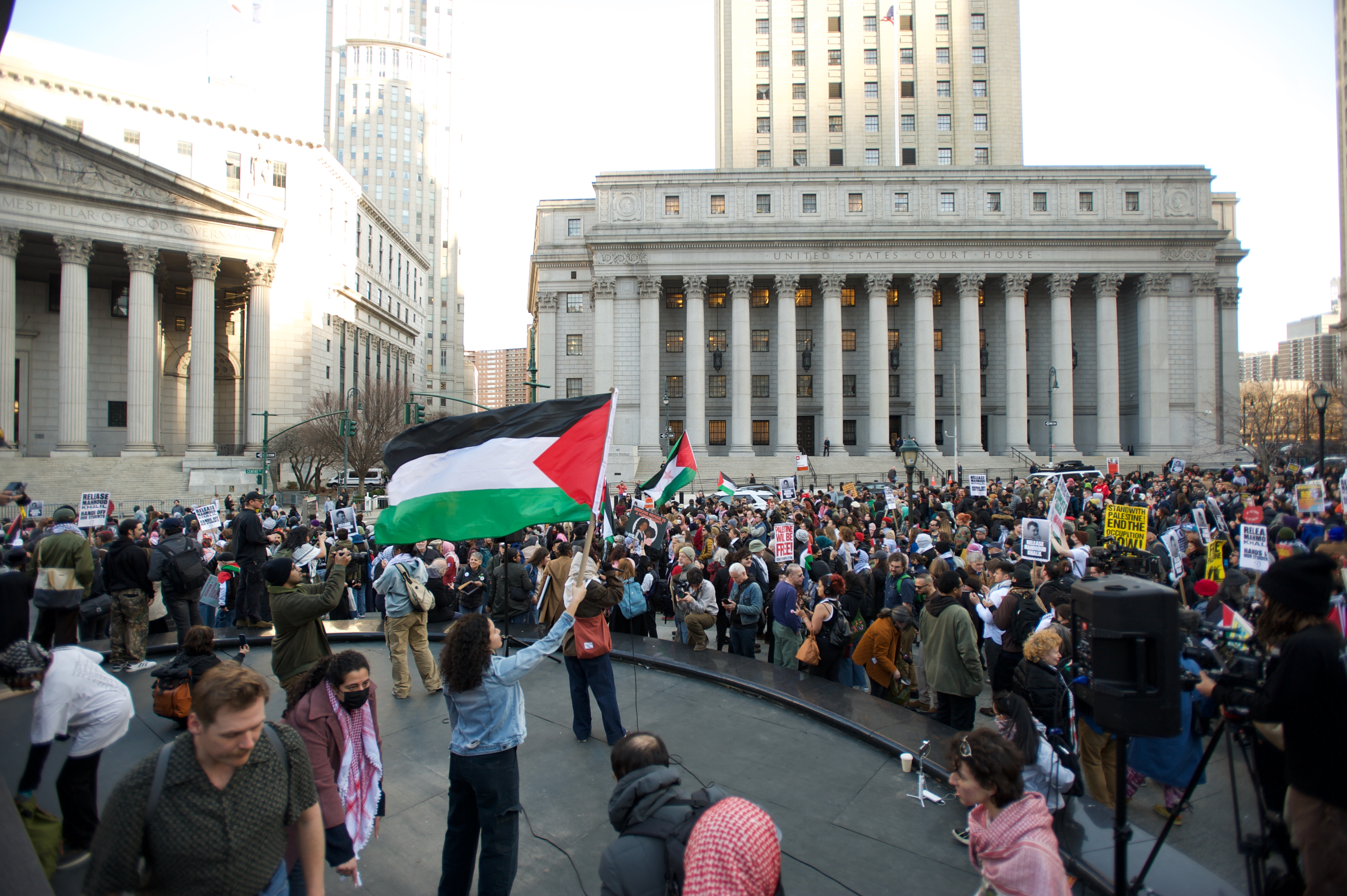
Protest against the detention of Mahmoud Khalil, who was charged with antisemitism, New York City on March 10, 2025

During his first administration, on December 11, 2019, Trump signed Executive Order 13899, "Combating Anti-Semitism," aimed at using laws that prohibit institutional discrimination against people based on race, color or national origin to punish discrimination against Jewish people more easily, and classifying opposition to the existence of Israel as antisemitism.

During his second administration, on January 29, 2025, Trump signed Executive Order 14188, "Additional Measures to Combat Anti-Semitism", which focuses on antisemitism in educational settings, especially in higher education. Trump claimed that there has been an "explosion of antisemitism" in the United States and vowed to arrest and deport "Hamas sympathizers" and "pro-jihadist" student protesters. The executive order has been used in attempts to deport holders of student visas and green cards who have expressed pro-Palestinian views, and in investigations into 60 colleges and universities based on their alleged failures to protect students from "antisemitic harassment and discrimination". Such uses have been supported by some Jewish groups and opposed by others, with multiple of the latter groups suggesting that antisemitism is being used as a guise for authoritarianism.

When polled in May, 49% of registered Jewish voters said that the actions taken against higher education had increased antisemitism, compared to 25% who believed that they reduced antisemitism, and when asked about the arrest and deportation of pro-Palestinian protesters, 61% said that it increased antisemitism, compared to 20% who said it reduced antisemitism. In a September poll of Jewish adults, 60% opposed the administration's withholding of funds from universities due to their alleged failure to combat antisemitism, and three-quarters believed that the administration was using this alleged failure as a "political maneuver" to crack down on free speech and academic freedom and not out of a genuine concern about antisemitism.

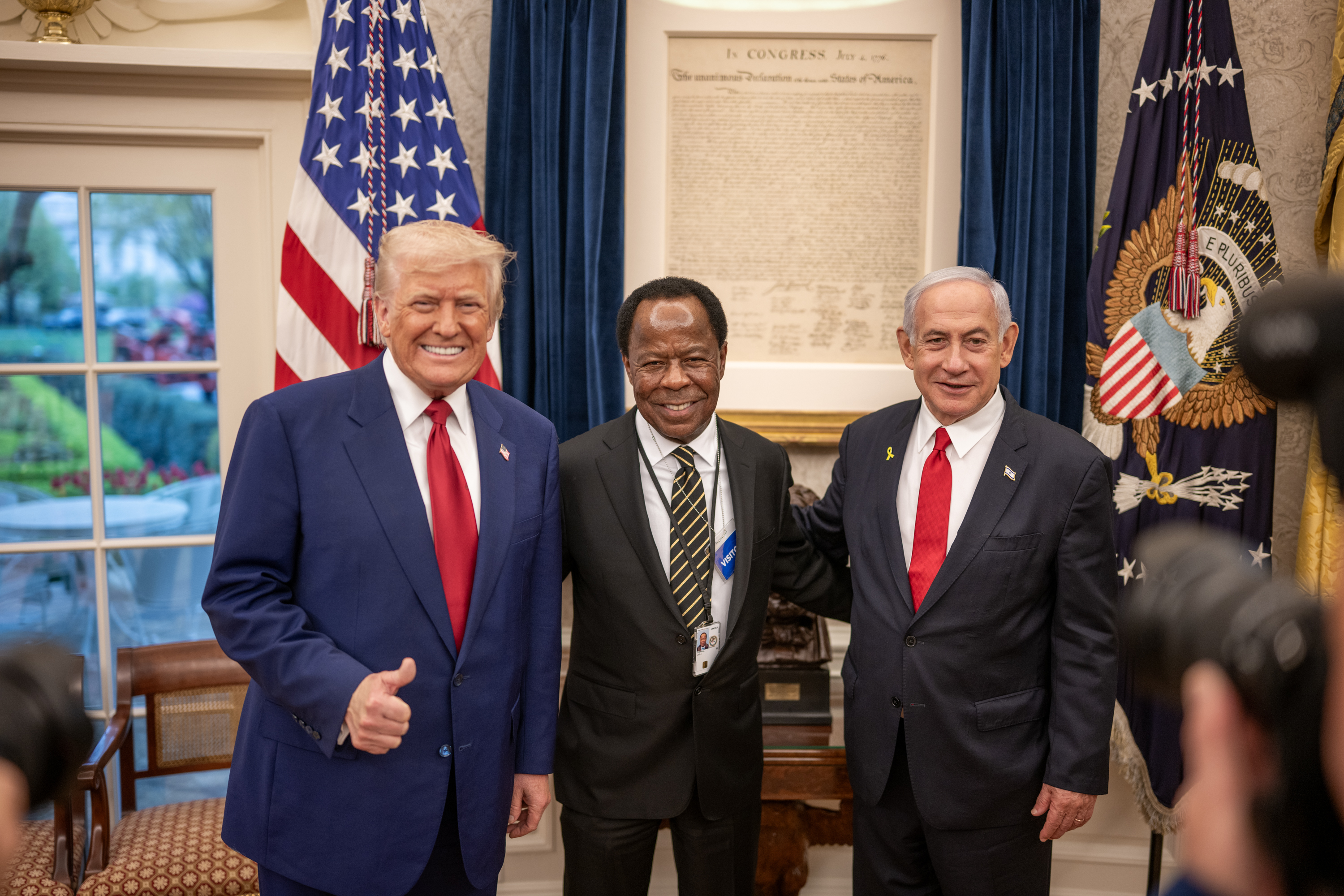
Leo Terrell, the head of the Trump administration's Task Force to Combat Antisemitism, with President Trump and Israeli Prime Minister Benjamin Netanyahu on April 7, 2025

Lily Sawyer-Kaplan, a lawyer with the Department of Justice's Civil Rights Division, which enforces federal laws that prohibit various kinds of discrimination, resigned in April 2025, citing pressure "to use antisemitism as a pretext to undermine free speech."

The administration later froze $2.2 billion in research funding to Harvard University, alleging that it had not done enough to combat antisemitism. Harvard sued, and on September 3, Judge Allison Bourroughs ruled in Harvard's favor, saying she found it "difficult to conclude anything other than that [the Trump administration] used antisemitism as a smokescreen for a targeted, ideologically motivated assault on this country's premier universities, and did so in a way that runs afoul of [federal law]". The Trump administration said it would appeal the ruling.

=== Response of Jewish organizations ===
In April 2025, a group of 10 major Jewish-American organizations issued a joint statement denouncing the Trump administration's antisemitism policies. The statement said that "These actions do not make Jews — or any community — safer. Rather, they only make us less safe." The organizations that denounced Trump's antisemitism policies included the Union for Reform Judaism, the Central Conference of American Rabbis, HIAS, the Religious Action Center of Reform Judaism, the American Conference of Cantors, the National Council of Jewish Women, the Conservative movement's Rabbinical Assembly, the Reconstructionist Rabbinical Association, and the Jewish Council for Public Affairs.

== See also ==
- Anti-Palestinianism, a form of anti-Arab racism and a form of anti–Middle Eastern sentiment
- Antisemitism in Christianity, a form of religious antisemitism
- Antisemitism by country#United States
  - Antisemitism in the United States, a form of racism in the United States and a form of religious discrimination in the United States
    - History of antisemitism in the United States
      - Universities and antisemitism
        - Antisemitism in US higher education
          - Antisemitism at Columbia University
- Donald Trump and fascism, an aspect of the history of fascism in the United States and an aspect of the history of the radical right in the United States
- Donald Trump and Islamophobia
- Donald Trump and religion
- Elon Musk salute controversy
- Islamophobia in the United States, another form of religious discrimination in the United States
- Israel–United States relations, an aspect of the United States foreign policy in the Middle East
- Opposition to antisemitism
- Philosemitism
- Racial views of Donald Trump
- Weaponization of antisemitism
- Zionist antisemitism
