= Time for Love (Bill Tarmey album) =

Studio album by Bill Tarmey
- Released: 1994
- Studio: Olympic Studios, London
- Label: EMI
- Producer: Derek Wadsworth

Bill Tarmey chronology
A Gift of Love (1993)	Time for Love (1994)	After Hours (1996)

Professional ratings
Review scores
Source	Rating
AllMusic	2/5 stars

Time for Love is the second album by English actor and singer Bill Tarmey, released in 1994 by EMI Records. As with Tarmey's previous album A Gift of Love (1993) and subsequent albums, Time for Love mostly contains cover versions of songs previously recorded by other artists.

The track "I.O.U.", a cover of a song by American country music singer Lee Greenwood, was released as a single from the album, reaching number 55 in the UK singles chart and becoming Tarmey's third top 75 hit.

== Track listing ==
No.	Title	Writer(s)	Original artist	Length
1.	"Time for Love"	Leon Russell	Leon Russell	3:57
2.	"Don't It Make My Brown Eyes Blue"	Richard Leigh	Crystal Gayle	3:03
3.	"I.O.U."	Austin Roberts; Kerry Chater	Lee Greenwood	3:03
4.	"I'm the One"	Ralph MacDonald; William Salter; William Eaton	Roberta Flack	4:04
5.	"If I Thought You'd Ever Change Your Mind"	John Cameron	Blond (Tages)	2:48
6.	"If This Is What Love Can Do"	Alan Coates; Johnny Wakelin	Johnny Wakelin	4:28
7.	"Don't Know Much"	Barry Mann; Cynthia Weil; Tom Snow	Barry Mann	2:56
8.	"Dance of Love"	Dan Hill; Doug James	Dan Hill	3:29
9.	"Some People"	Alan Tarney	Cliff Richard	3:51
10.	"The Perfect Year"	Andrew Lloyd Webber; Don Black; Christopher Hampton	Dina Carroll	3:35
11.	"One Shining Moment"	Vaneese Thomas	Diana Ross	4:42
12.	"Belonging"	David Gates	Bread	3:21
13.	"You and I"	Leslie Bricusse	Petula Clark	3:38
14.	"As Long as You Are There"	Roberts; Jimmy Dunne	original song	4:05

== Personnel ==
Adapted from the album's liner notes.

Musicians

- Derek Wadsworth – arranger, conductor, trombone (track 4)
- Dave Hartley – piano, keyboards
- Tommy Eyre – piano, keyboards
- Mitch Dalton – guitars, guitar solo (track 8)
- Mo Foster – bass guitar
- Brett Morgan – drums
- Frank Ricotti – percussion
- Geoff Castle – synthesisers
- Andy Vinter – synthesisers
- Pat Halling – string leader
- Nick Busche – horn
- Quentin Williams – orchestral management
- Ray Warleigh – saxophone (track 13)
- Gareth Hulse – cor anglais (track 5)
- Jack Emblow – accordion (track 12)
- Brendan Power – harmonica (track 2)
- Kay Garner – backing vocals
- Sue Glover – backing vocals
- Tony Burrows – backing vocals

Technical

- Derek Wadsworth – producer
- Roger Wake – engineer, mastering
- David Garnish – main assistant engineer
- Ian Roberson – assistant engineer
- Julie Gardener – assistant engineer
- Recorded at Olympic Studios, London

== Charts ==
Chart performance for Time for Love
Chart (1994)	Peak position
Scottish Albums (OCC)	47
UK Albums (OCC)	28

== Certifications ==
Region	Certification	Certified units/sales
United Kingdom (BPI)	Silver	60,000^{^}
^{^} Shipments figures based on certification alone.
