= The Faith of Donald J. Trump =

2018 book by David Brody and Scott Lamb

The Faith of Donald J. Trump: A Spiritual Biography
- Authors: David Brody; Scott Lamb
- Language: English
- Genre: Non-fiction
- Publisher: Harper Collins
- Publication date: 2018
- ISBN: 978-0-06-274958-1 (Hardcover)
- OCLC: 1023431974

The Faith of Donald J. Trump: A Spiritual Biography is a 2018 non-fiction book co-authored by David Brody and Scott Lamb about the religious faith of U.S. President Donald Trump. Shortly after its release, Trump tweeted that it was a "very interesting read."

Reviewing it for The Weekly Standard, Erick Erickson noted, "the authors suggest that Trump’s rapacious libido is just his misguided quest for God." He added that they downplay Norman Vincent Peale's influence on Trump, and concluded that the relationship between evangelical leaders and Trump is "utterly transactional."

== Reception ==
The book was heavily criticized, and treated as a joke by many newspapers and organizations.

== See also ==
- Donald Trump and religion
