= Executive Order 14188 =

2025 executive order signed by Donald Trump

- Additional Measures To Combat Anti-Semitism
- Type: Executive order
- Number: 14188
- President: Donald Trump
- Signed: January 29, 2025

Federal Register details
- Federal Register document number: 2025-02230
- Publication date: January 29, 2025

Summary
- Orders each executive agency head to submit a report to the President on actions to combat anti-Semitism, and analyze pending complaints related to campus anti-Semitism occurring after October 7, 2023

Executive Order 14188, or "Additional Measures to Combat Anti-Semitism" is an executive order signed on January 29, 2025, by Donald Trump at the beginning of his second presidential term.

== Background ==
Antisemitism in the United States saw a reported rise due to far-right nationalist movements in prior statistics in both 2018 and 2019 based on FBI reporting. 2019 also saw a range of attacks against individuals wearing identifiable Jewish clothing in New York City, by neo-Nazis and other groups. During the 2021 Gaza conflict, there was also a surge of violent assaults against Jewish people throughout the country.

On October 7, 2023, Hamas militants led a surprise attack on Israel which caused 1,139 deaths – 695 Israelis, 71 foreign nationals and 373 Israeli security forces – and took 251 hostage. This attack sparked the Gaza war, with the resulting military actions having caused the deaths of about 50,500 Palestinians as of April 2025. Pro-Palestine and anti-war protests have been seen world wide, with protesters calling for a cease fire and end to the Israeli occupation. There have also been pro-Israel counter-protests.

During the Gaza war protests in the United States, which were started with the 2024 Columbia University pro-Palestinian campus occupations; allegations of antisemitism were raised by some Jewish students and alums. Other Jews have disputed these allegations, arguing that Zionism and not Judaism was the target of the protests. Antisemitism during the Gaza war, however, has surged worldwide.

Also during 2023, two violent attacks targeting Jewish and minority individuals were seen in Los Angeles, California, and Toms River, New Jersey. In February 2023, a 28-year-old opened fire outside two separate synagogues wounding two Jewish men, and the shooter had previously posted far-right antisemitic content online. In June 2023 four Jewish homes were set on fire, while fourteen others and one Hispanic were targeted with neo-Nazi, white supremacist and antisemitic graffiti.

== Provisions ==
The order's language focuses on antisemitism in education, K-12 and higher education, referencing the October 7 Hamas attacks. It also directs the Secretary of Homeland Security and attorney general to action. "Alien students and staff" are named as targets for monitoring.

== Implementation ==
On February 2, 2025, U.S. Department of Education announced investigations of Columbia University, Northwestern University, Portland State University, the University of California, Berkeley and the University of Minnesota.

On March 10, the U.S. Department of Education’s Office for Civil Rights sent letters to 60 US universities warning them about claimed inaction to protect Jewish students from discrimination. Citing Columbia's alleged failure to combat antisemitism, President Donald Trump revoked $400 million in federal grants and contracts on March 14, 2025, the largest part of which were NIH grants.

On March 15, 2025, Mahmoud Khalil, a Palestinian student organizer of the Columbia campus protest, who holds permanent residency in the US via the green card program, was arrested and detained by ICE. During the arrest, the ICE agents refused to give their names, indicated that they would revoke Khalil's green card and reportedly did not show a warrant before placing Khalil in an unmarked car. Khalil's arrest has received widespread criticism, as arresting somebody for political views is a violation of the First Amendment to the United States Constitution.

== Legal ==
Shortly after the arrest and detention of Khalil in mid March 2025 Taal v. Trump was filed by the American-Arab Anti-Discrimination Committee against the order and Executive Order 14161 which instructs the executive branch to take steps to "vet and screen" all noncitizens residing or entering the country to ensure they do not express "hostile attitudes" towards the US "citizens, culture, government, institutions or founding principles", and to take steps to deport anyone who does. The plaintiffs include Momodou Taal, another Cornell graduate student, and Professor Mũkoma wa Ngũgĩ, who engaged in anti-war activism on campus and allege the two orders violate the First and Fifth Amendments.

On March 24, 2025, another Columbia student targeted for deportation by the order, Yunseo Chung, sued President Donald Trump, Secretary of State Marco Rubio, and Attorney General Pamela Bondi, among other defendants, for violating her First Amendment rights to free speech and alleging that she was detained illegally.

== Reception ==
The order has been condemned by civil rights groups and some Jewish groups. The American Civil Liberties Union has alleged that "the White House is attempting to pressure university officials to target immigrant and international students, faculty, and staff, including holders of non-immigrant visas and lawful permanent residents or others on a path to U.S. citizenship, for exercising their First Amendment rights." Several Jewish groups have said that the Trump administration is using antisemitism as a guise for authoritarianism.

Gil Troy, a senior fellow in Zionist thought at the Jewish People Policy Institute and American presidential historian, praised the executive order in a Jerusalem Post opinion piece, claiming that many colleges and universities have "abdicated their educational values, moral responsibilities and legal obligations to protect all students, including Jews". While Troy concedes that the order was rebuffed by some Jewish people, he argued that those who do should be ashamed of themselves but also called the implementation sloppy.

== See also ==
- Donald Trump and antisemitism
