= You've Got a Good Love Comin' (song) =

Single by Lee Greenwood

from the album You've Got a Good Love Comin'
- B-side: "Even Love Can't Save Us Now"
- Released: December 22, 1984
- Genre: Country
- Length: 2:55
- Label: MCA
- Songwriter(s): Van Stephenson, Jeff Silbar, Danny Morrison
- Producer(s): Jerry Crutchfield

Lee Greenwood singles chronology
"Fool's Gold" (1984)	"You've Got a Good Love Comin'" (1984)	"Dixie Road" (1985)

"You've Got a Good Love Comin'" is a song written by Van Stephenson, Jeff Silbar and Danny Morrison, and originally recorded by Stephenson on his 1981 album "China Girl". It was later released in December 1984 by American country music artist Lee Greenwood as the third single and title track from his album You've Got a Good Love Comin'. Greenwood's version reached #9 on the Billboard Hot Country Singles & Tracks chart.

== Personnel ==
Adapted from liner notes.

- Pete Bordonali – electric guitar
- Steve Gibson – acoustic guitar
- Vince Gill – background vocals
- Greg Gordon – background vocals
- Lee Greenwood – lead vocals
- David Hungate – bass guitar
- Bobby Ogdin – keyboards
- Hargus "Pig" Robbins – piano
- James Stroud – drums
- Dennis Wilson – background vocals

== Other versions ==
The song was also recorded by Conway Twitty on his 1983 album Lost in the Feeling.

== Chart performance ==
=== Van Stephenson ===
Chart (1981)	Peak position
US Billboard Hot 100	79

=== Lee Greenwood ===
Chart (1984–1985)	Peak position
US Hot Country Songs (Billboard)	9
Canadian RPM Country Tracks	6
