= Dixie Road (song) =

Single by Lee Greenwood

from the album Greatest Hits
- B-side: "(I Found Love) In Time"
- Released: March 1985
- Genre: Country
- Length: 3:18
- Label: MCA
- Songwriter(s): Don Goodman; Pam Rose; Mary Ann Kennedy
- Producer(s): Jerry Crutchfield

Lee Greenwood singles chronology
"You've Got a Good Love Comin'" (1984)	"Dixie Road" (1985)	"I Don't Mind the Thorns (If You're the Rose)" (1985)

"Dixie Road" is a song written by Don Goodman, Pam Rose and Mary Ann Kennedy. It was first recorded by Leslie Utter in 1979. The King Henry version got to number 48 on the Hot Country Songs charts.

It was later recorded by American country music artist Lee Greenwood. It was released in March 1985 as the first single from his Greatest Hits compilation album. Greenwood's version was his third number one on the country chart. The single went to number one for one week and spent a total of fourteen weeks on the country chart.

== Charts ==
=== Weekly charts ===
Chart (1985)	Peak position
US Hot Country Songs (Billboard)	1
Canadian RPM Country Tracks	1

=== Year-end charts ===
Chart (1985)	Position
US Hot Country Songs (Billboard)	2
