= Donald Trump and Islamophobia =

Before and during his political career, Donald Trump, the 45th and 47th president of the United States, has had a history of speech and actions viewed by journalists, scholars, civil rights organizations, and fellow politicians as anti-Muslim and as bringing Islamophobia into the mainstream in the United States. These include a call for a "total and complete shutdown of Muslims entering the United States", statements such as "Islam hates us", false claims that communities with large Arab populations widely cheered the September 11 attacks, and attacks invoking the Muslim faith of public figures such as U.S. Senator-elect Abdul El-Sayed.

Trump has denied holding anti-Muslim views, calling Islam one of the world's great faiths. He has defended his policies as neutral and necessary for national security and counterterrorism, a position that the Supreme Court accepted with respect to travel restrictions in Trump v. Hawaii.

== Pre-presidency ==
=== "Muslim problem" remarks ===
In a 2011 interview on The O'Reilly Factor, asked by Bill O'Reilly if there was a "Muslim problem" in the world, Trump responded, "Absolutely ... I didn't notice Swedish people knocking down the World Trade Center." In 2015 he repeated similar lines, adding a caveat that he "love[s] the Muslims". The Washington Post's David Weigel described the line as a "concise argument for religious profiling".

== 2016 campaign ==
=== 9/11 celebration claim ===
At a rally in Birmingham, Alabama on November 21, 2015, while defending his call for surveillance of mosques, Trump falsely claimed that he had seen television reports about "thousands and thousands of people" in Jersey City, New Jersey celebrating as the World Trade Center collapsed during the 9/11 attacks. In an interview with George Stephanopoulos, Trump doubled down on the assertion, stating that the cheering had taken place "where you have large Arab populations". The claim, widely reported as referring to Muslims, echoed a long-circulating, debunked rumor that Muslims in New Jersey had celebrated the attacks.

=== Proposed Muslim registry ===
After the November 2015 Paris attacks, asked about a potential database tracking American Muslims, Trump said he "would certainly implement" it: "There should be a lot of systems, beyond databases." When asked whether they would be legally required to register, he said, "They have to be." Asked repeatedly how this would differ from mandatory registration of Jews in Nazi Germany, he responded, "You tell me." Political rivals and Muslim and Jewish leaders denounced the remarks; Jeb Bush said Trump was "manipulating people's angst and their fears".

=== "Islam hates us" remark ===
In a March 2016 interview with CNN's Anderson Cooper, Trump said: "I think Islam hates us. ... There's a tremendous hatred. We have to get to the bottom of it." A spokesperson clarified he intended to refer only to "radical Islam", but the next day, asked whether he was referring to all Muslims, he said "a lot of them ... I will stick with exactly what I said to Anderson Cooper." Rival candidate Marco Rubio denounced the comments as pandering to people's fears, and the Council on American–Islamic Relations said the comments reflected a "bigoted mindset" and demanded an apology.

=== Remarks about the Khan family ===
In July 2016, Khizr Khan, whose son Humayun Khan was killed while serving in Iraq, spoke against Trump's proposed ban on Muslim immigration at the Democratic National Convention; his wife, Ghazala Khan, stood silently beside him. In an ABC interview, Trump said, "She had nothing to say. She probably, maybe she wasn't allowed to have anything to say. You tell me." Ghazala, who Khizr said had co-written the speech, rejected Trump's implication that, as a Muslim woman, she had not been allowed to speak, writing in The Washington Post that she had been too overcome with grief and that "when Donald Trump is talking about Islam, he is ignorant".

Trump's remarks were denounced by Republicans including John McCain, and the families of 17 Americans killed in war condemned the implication that "her religion, not her grief, kept her from addressing an arena of people". Writing in The Guardian, Amana Fontanella-Khan argued that "where everyone else saw a mother, Trump saw a Muslim".

== First presidency ==
=== Immigration policy ===
'Trump Immigration Order Sparks Protests at NY Airport' report from Voice of America

On January 27, 2017, via executive order, which he titled Protecting the Nation from Foreign Terrorist Entry into the US, Trump ordered the border indefinitely closed to Syrian refugees fleeing the civil war. He abruptly temporarily halted (for 90 days) immigration from six other Muslim-majority nations: Iraq, Iran, Libya, Somalia, Sudan and Yemen. Human rights activists described these actions as government-approved religious persecution. The order was stayed by Federal courts. Trump would go on to issue revised versions of the ban in March and September 2017. The Supreme Court eventually upheld the third version in June 2018, with Chief Justice Roberts writing for the majority that "The Proclamation is expressly premised on legitimate purposes: preventing entry of nationals who cannot be adequately vetted and inducing other nations to improve their practices". However, dissenting, Justice Sonia Sotomayor compared the opinion to one made in 1944 which allowed the internment of Japanese Americans during World War II. Moustafa Bayoumi criticised the Court for upholding the Executive Order, commenting, "The Muslim ban ruling legitimates Trump's bigotry [...] and the racist view that Muslims are a unique national security threat because they are Muslims persists."

=== Retweeting anti-Muslim videos ===
In November 2017, Trump retweeted without comment three anti-Muslim videos captioned as showing Muslims committing violence. The videos were originally posted by Jayda Fransen, deputy leader of the far-right group Britain First, who had been convicted in 2016 of religiously aggravated harassment against a Muslim woman. The first, captioned "Muslim migrant beats up Dutch boy on crutches!", showed an attacker later identified as a native-born Dutch teenager of unknown religion. The others showed a man smashing a statue of the Virgin Mary in Syria in 2013, and a teenager being pushed off a roof during the 2013 unrest in Egypt, for which one of the perpetrators was later executed.

A spokesman for British prime minister Theresa May said it was "wrong" for Trump to share the videos and that "Britain First seeks to divide communities through their use of hateful narratives which peddle lies and stoke tensions". Trump replied on Twitter that May should "focus on the destructive Radical Islamic Terrorism that is taking place within the United Kingdom". White House press secretary Sarah Huckabee Sanders said that whether or not the videos were authentic, "the threat is real".

== Second presidency ==
=== Attacks on Abdul El-Sayed ===
During the 2026 U.S. Senate election in Michigan, Trump repeatedly targeted Democratic nominee Abdul El-Sayed, an Egyptian-American Muslim, in a series of attacks widely condemned as racist and Islamophobic. Throughout the campaign, Trump labeled El-Sayed a "radical jihadist", "jihadist lunatic who hates our country", and "terrorist sympathizer", falsely claiming he was "absolutely Muslim Brotherhood". He said El-Sayed wants the U.S. to "go to Shariah law" and warned he would "invite hordes of jihadists to our shores" inciting violence until "you cannot even have a Christmas". Trump likened voting against El-Sayed to fighting the September 11 hijackers ("Michigan needs to stand up and fight, just like Todd [Beamer] did, to stop a jihadist from walking into the Capitol") and said he should be required to pass through a metal detector before entering the Senate chamber. He mocked El-Sayed's name as "Adulbabababababa" and deliberately replaced his first name with "Mohammed" (El-Sayed's middle name), declaring, "Somebody said, 'His name isn't Mohammed; it's Abdul.' I said, 'To me, it's Mohammed.'" He urged voters to "send him back to where he came from", despite El-Sayed having been born and raised in Michigan.

El-Sayed criticized Trump's rhetoric as an Islamophobic attempt to "distract us from the suffering his policies are inflicting on us." Addressing the mockery of his name, El-Sayed replied, "I don't care how he pronounces my name ... Because he can just go on and call me 'Senator' after November. I will be Senator Mohamed to you, bro."

Early on Election Day, Trump posted on Truth Social, without evidence, that El-Sayed "Hates Jews and Hates Blacks. Don't feel bad, he also Hates Whites" and said "[o]nly fools would vote for him." El-Sayed won the election by about seven percentage points.

== Analysis and responses ==
A 2017 report by the Bridge Initiative, a research project on Islamophobia at Georgetown University, argued that Trump's election had brought far-right Islamophobic discourse into the political mainstream.

The Council on American–Islamic Relations (CAIR) has repeatedly condemned Trump's rhetoric and policies. In 2026, it attributed a record number of anti-Muslim and anti-Arab complaints in 2025 in part to his administration's crackdown on pro-Palestinian protests and immigration, and said Trump's description of Democratic candidates as "jihadists" was "putting a target on the back of Muslim elected officials".

In August 2026, The New York Times said that Trump has demonized Muslims and people of Arab descent throughout his political career. It wrote that, especially in the run-up to the 2026 midterm elections, anti-Muslim rhetoric had become increasingly normalized among Republicans, and that Trump had declined to condemn it and "leaned into" it.

Trump has argued that his rhetoric and policies target terrorism rather than Muslims as a group. In 2017, he called Islam "one of the world's great faiths" and said the fight against terrorism was "not a battle between different faiths" but rather "a battle between barbaric criminals ... and decent people". CAIR welcomed the remark about Islam but said that it "does not wipe out years of well-documented anti-Islam animus".

Trump has denied that his immigration policies, which included a first-term ban on travel from several Muslim-majority countries, are discriminatory, saying they aim to improve domestic security and curb illegal immigration. In Trump v. Hawaii (2018), the Supreme Court upheld a version of the ban, holding that it was neutral on its face and rejecting the challengers' claim of anti-Muslim bias; four justices dissented, with Justice Sonia Sotomayor, joined by Justice Ruth Bader Ginsburg, writing that a reasonable observer would conclude the policy was "motivated by anti-Muslim animus".

== See also ==
- Racial views of Donald Trump
- Donald Trump and antisemitism
- Donald Trump and religion
- Trump travel ban
