= I.O.U. (Lee Greenwood song) =

"I.O.U"

Single by Lee Greenwood

from the album Somebody's Gonna Love You
- B-side: "Another You"
- Released: March 1983
- Genre: Country
- Length: 3:05
- Label: MCA
- Songwriter(s): Kerry Chater; Austin Roberts
- Producer(s): Jerry Crutchfield

Lee Greenwood singles chronology
"Ain't No Trick (It Takes Magic)" (1982)	"I.O.U" (1983)	"Somebody's Gonna Love You" (1983)

"I.O.U. (I Owe You)" is a song written by Kerry Chater and Austin Roberts, and recorded by American country music artist Lee Greenwood. It was released in March 1983 the first single from his album Somebody's Gonna Love You.

The single peaked at number 6 on the U.S. country charts and number 4 in Canada. It also peaked at number 4 on the U.S. adult contemporary charts. Other than "God Bless the U.S.A.", it is Greenwood's biggest crossover hit, peaking at number 53 on the Billboard Hot 100. The song has been covered numerous times, the version by the German band Carry & Ron becoming a well-known pop song in South Korea.

== Charts ==
=== Weekly charts ===
Chart (1983)	Peak position
US Billboard Hot 100	53
US Adult Contemporary (Billboard)	4
US Hot Country Songs (Billboard)	6
Canadian RPM Country Tracks	4

=== Year-end charts ===
Chart (1983)	Position
US Adult Contemporary (Billboard)	21
US Hot Country Songs (Billboard)	42

== Bill Tarmey version ==
In 1994, English actor/singer Bill Tarmey released his version as a single, from his second album Time for Love. It reached No. 55 on the UK Singles Chart.
