= Bill Tarmey =

English actor and singer (1941–2012)

- Tarmey as Jack Duckworth in 2007
- Born: William Piddington; 4 April 1941; Ardwick, Manchester, England
- Died: 9 November 2012 (aged 71); Tenerife, Canary Islands, Spain
- Occupations: Actor, singer
- Years active: 1968–2010
- Known for: Role of Jack Duckworth in Coronation Street (1979, 1981–2010)
- Spouse: Alma (Ali) Cleworth-Piddington (m. 1962)
- Children: 2

Bill Tarmey (born William Piddington; 4 April 1941 – 9 November 2012) was an English actor and singer, best known for playing Jack Duckworth in the soap opera Coronation Street. First appearing in the role in November 1979, he played it continuously from 1981 to 2010.

== Early life and education ==
Tarmey was born in Ardwick, Manchester, Lancashire. Shortly after his birth, he moved with his family to live in Bradford, Manchester, where he was also educated. Following the death of his father William in 1944 whilst driving an ambulance at the Battle of Arnhem during the Second World War, his mother Lilian remarried, to Robert Cleworth. Tarmey attended the Bradford Memorial School and the Queens Street School (which became the Philips Park Secondary Modern School). On leaving school, he was apprenticed to his stepfather, who was an asphalt spreader by trade. He also worked in the construction industry for a number of years.

== Career ==
In 1968, Tarmey gave up his job in the building industry to work as a nightclub singer and entertainer. In order to supplement his income, he took on work as an extra on shows such as Coronation Street, amongst others. Despite suffering a serious heart attack in 1976 and a stroke in 1977, he was eventually offered the role of Jack Duckworth, a character who would go on to become an institution in British soap operas. He underwent quintuple bypass surgery in January 1987, and had a pacemaker fitted in June 2002 after suffering a second heart attack, which was used as a storyline in Coronation Street to explain his absence. He also developed sleep apnoea, disrupting his breathing while asleep.

He played Tony in the 1979 ITV play "Print Out", opposite fellow Coronation Street actor Bill Waddington.

Tarmey was an extra in the Granada Television adaptation of King Lear (1983) which starred Laurence Olivier in the title role.

He appeared on Lily Savage's Blankety Blank.

=== Departure from Coronation Street ===
In April 2006, when he turned 65, Tarmey announced he was thinking of retiring, which prompted letters of protest from fans. In 2009, he wanted to leave his role in Coronation Street due to his multiple health problems, which included severe breathing problems. The show's producers, however, persuaded him to stay until the 50th anniversary, in December of the following year. News of his departure was announced on 9 April 2010. Commenting, he said, "I've had the most amazing 30 years playing Jack. Because of him I've made fantastic friends and travelled all over the world. I'll be sorry to say goodbye". Tarmey's departure was pushed forward to 8 November 2010 episode because of his declining health; in this episode Jack died asleep in his chair in a manner similar to the death of Vera (although Jack had a storyline illness). Tarmey was the second longest serving male actor in the show.

In a March 2011 interview with Nigel Pivaro, Tarmey revealed he also had to leave the series because his son Carl had been diagnosed with a brain tumour in 2009.

== Personal life ==
In 1955, he met his future wife Ali (1941-2015) in the local youth club. The couple married in 1962 and had two children.

== Health issues ==
Tarmey suffered from poor health for many years, having a severe heart attack at the age of 35 and also a stroke when he was 36. He had heart bypass surgery twice, once in 1987 and again (following another heart attack) in 2002. He and his wife Ali lived in Ashton-under-Lyne. He also suffered from sleep apnoea due to breathing problems. Despite his multiple health problems, Tarmey refused to stop smoking. In May 2011 Tarmey revealed that he needed to undergo further heart surgery.

== Death ==
A Coronation Street spokesman confirmed that Tarmey died in Tenerife from a heart attack on the morning of 9 November 2012 at the age of 71.

== Music career ==
Tarmey was an accomplished singer and released several albums. Four of his albums, A Gift of Love (1993), Time for Love (1994), After Hours (1996) and In My Life (2001) appeared on the UK Albums Chart, as well as three singles charting on the UK Singles Chart. His biggest hit single was a cover of the Barry Manilow song "One Voice" which Tarmey recorded with the St Winifred's School Choir and producers Stock & Waterman (from 1980s hitmaking production team Stock Aitken Waterman). This one-off release would reach number 16 in the UK singles chart for BMG's Arista label, with Tarmey signing a deal with EMI to record more music, after its success.

In 1995, to commemorate the programme's 35th anniversary, a CD titled The Coronation Street Album was released, featuring cover versions of modern songs and standards by contemporary cast members. Tarmey appeared as one of the backing vocalists for Bill Waddington, on "The Coronation Street Single" version of Monty Python's "Always Look on the Bright Side of Life". This single was a number 35 hit in December.

Tarmey's autobiography, Jack Duckworth and Me: My Life on the Street and Other Adventures, was published in 2010.

== Discography ==
=== Albums ===
- A Gift of Love (1993), EMI – UK #15, NZ #15
- Time for Love (1994), EMI – UK #28
- After Hours (1996), EMI Premier – UK #61
- Down Home (1997), Connoisseur Collection
- In My Life (2001), EMI – UK #80

=== Singles ===
- "Our Song of Love" (duet with Ruth Madoc) (1988), Sain
- "I'll Be with You Soon" (duet with Liz Dawn) (1989), Westmoor Music
- "One Voice" (1993), Arista – UK #16
- "The Wind Beneath My Wings" (1994), EMI – UK #40
- "I.O.U." (1994), EMI – UK #55
