= Dual loyalty =

In politics, loyalty to separate interests that potentially conflict

In politics, dual loyalty is loyalty to two separate interests that potentially conflict with each other, leading to a conflict of interest. Multiple citizenship has been considered in some countries as dual loyalty.

== United States ==
During World War II, a number of United States citizens of Japanese, German, and Italian ancestry, including some born in the U.S., were confined to internment camps (see Internment of Japanese Americans).

The loyalty of many Americans to the U.S. government was called into question during the Cold War due to alleged Communist sympathies, resulting in "witch-hunts" of various government officials, celebrities and other citizens (see McCarthyism, Lavender Scare).

"Dual loyalty" continues to be a concern of critics of US immigration policy, particularly in those states which border Mexico.

During the impeachment of Donald Trump in 2020, some Republican members of Congress accused Lieutenant-Colonel Alexander Vindman of dual loyalty towards Ukraine due to his Ukrainian heritage.

== Religious groups ==
=== Catholics ===
Roman Catholics are subject to the Pope on religious matters. This has often perceived as dual loyalty by powers opposed to the Holy See.

During the English Reformation, many important English and Scottish Catholics, such as Thomas More, Mary, Queen of Scots and Edmund Campion, were tried and executed for their alleged double loyalty to the Papacy and infidelity to the Crown.

During John F. Kennedy's campaign for and tenure as U.S. President, some opponents questioned whether a Roman Catholic President of the United States had a divided loyalty with respect to the Papacy and Vatican City.

Chinese Catholics have been forced by the government of the People's Republic of China of substituting the Roman Catholic Church in China by the Chinese Patriotic Catholic Association.

=== Jews ===
Jews who were part of the Jewish diaspora have been accused of dual loyalty by the Romans in the 1st century, by the French in the Dreyfus Affair in the late 19th century, and in Stalin-era Soviet Union in the 20th century. Supreme Court Justice Louis Brandeis argued that American Jews could be fully loyal to both the United States and Zionism, contending that Jewish values were fundamentally compatible with American democratic ideals. Before the creation of Israel, anti-Zionist British Jews used the accusation against Zionist Jews in the UK. While today some use the phrase in a "neutral and non-pejorative fashion," John J. Mearsheimer and Stephen M. Walt say this use can obscure the fact that home nations and Israel may have sharp political differences.

The 1991 Gulf War and the 2003 U.S. invasion of Iraq lead to such accusations against Jewish neoconservatives, vocal proponents of war against Iraq who were alleged by some critics of the Iraq War to have sought to undermine Arab nations hostile to Israel (e.g., by the term "Israel-firster").

US president Donald Trump said in 2019 that that Jewish Americans who vote for Democrats were showing "either a total lack of knowledge or great disloyalty" towards Israel. ADL chief Jonathan Greenblatt responded that charges of disloyalty “have long been used to attack Jews" and "It’s long overdue to stop using Jews as a political football." In 2025 Trump attacked Senate minority leader Chuck Schumer, stating "As far as I'm concerned, he's become a Palestinian. He used to be Jewish. He's not Jewish any more. He's a Palestinian." Trump's remarks were condemned by rights groups as antisemitic and anti-Palestinian.

=== Muslims ===
Muslims living in Western countries, especially during periods of heightened tensions between Muslim minorities and non-Muslims, such as after September 11, 2001, or during the Jyllands-Posten cartoons controversy of 2005–2006, are sometimes accused of being more loyal to the Muslim ummah than to their country.

The Ahmadiyya movement in Islam has been accused by some Muslims of dual loyalty to the state of Israel, or less frequently the Hindu-majority state of India.

=== Hindus ===
Hindu minority in Bangladesh is often accused by the Islamists and right-wing nationalists like the Bangladesh Nationalist Party, and even by Sheikh Hasina of the nominally secular Awami League, for having dual loyalty towards neighbouring Hindu-majority India, which is linked to the anti-India sentiment in the country.

=== Baháʼís ===
The government of the Islamic Republic of Iran has accused the Baháʼí Faith minority of having loyalty to foreign powers (see Iranian anti-Baháʼí conspiracy theories).

== Transnationalist interpretations ==
Some scholars refer to a growing trend of transnationalism and suggest that as societies become more heterogeneous and multicultural, the term "dual loyalty" had increasingly become a meaningless bromide. According to the theory of transnationalism, migration and other factors, including improved global communication, produce new forms of identity that transcend traditional notions of physical and cultural space. Nina Glick Schiller, Linda Basch, and Cristina Blanc-Szanton define a process by which immigrants "link together" their country of origin and their country of settlement.

The transnationalist view is that "dual loyalty" is a potentially-positive expression of multi-culturalism and can contribute to the diversity and strength of civil society. That view is popular in many academic circles, but others are skeptical of the idea. As one paper describes it,

On occasion, these imagined communities conform to the root meaning of transnational, extending beyond loyalties that connect to any specific place of origin or ethnic or national group. Yet what immigration scholars describe as transnationalism is usually its opposite... highly particularistic attachments antithetical to those by-products of globalization denoted by the concept of "transnational civil society" and its related manifestations.

Beyond its usage in particular instances, the terms "dual loyalty" and "transnationalism" continue to be the subject of much debate. As one academic wrote:

Although the events of September 11th may have shaken some assumptions – at least in the United States – about the nature of transnational networks and their capacity to facilitate flows of people, goods, and ideas across borders, the terms "globalization" and "transnationalism" remain relatively stable, albeit frustratingly imprecise additions to the language of social sciences, including anthropology.

== See also ==
- Dual citizenship
- Ethnic interest group
- Fifth column
- Double agent
