= Fool's Gold (Lee Greenwood song) =

Single by Lee Greenwood

from the album You've Got a Good Love Comin'
- B-side: "Worth It for the Ride"
- Released: August 1984
- Genre: Country
- Length: 3:42
- Label: MCA
- Songwriter(s): Timmy Tappan; Don Roth
- Producer(s): Jerry Crutchfield

Lee Greenwood singles chronology
"God Bless the U.S.A." (1984)	"Fool's Gold" (1984)	"You've Got a Good Love Comin'" (1984)

"Fool's Gold" is a song written by Timmy Tappan and Don Roth, and recorded by American country music artist Lee Greenwood. It was released in August 1984 as the second single from his album You've Got a Good Love Comin'. The single peaked at number 3 on the U.S. country charts and number 5 in Canada.

== Personnel ==
Adapted from liner notes.

- Pete Bordonali – acoustic guitar
- David Briggs – piano
- Vince Gill – background vocals
- Greg Gordon – background vocals
- Lee Greenwood – lead vocals
- James Stroud – drums
- Bergen White – string arrangements
- Jack Williams – bass guitar
- Dennis Wilson – background vocals
- Reggie Young – electric guitar
- Nashville String Machine – string section

== Chart performance ==
Chart (1984)	Peak position
US Hot Country Songs (Billboard)	3
Canadian RPM Country Tracks	5
