= David Brody (journalist) =

American journalist

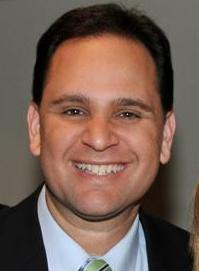
David Brody, 2007

David Philip Brody is an American commentator for the Christian Broadcasting Network. Brody is also known for his vocal support of Donald Trump.

Brody was born in New Jersey on February 13, 1965, and grew up in New York City. He was raised Reform Jewish, with his sister Karen Rachel but he notes neither of his parents were very religious. He converted to Evangelical Christianity in his 20s.

Brody graduated from Ithaca College (Ithaca, NY) in 1987 with a Bachelor of Science degree in communications. He was News Director at ABC affiliate KRDO-TV, Colorado Springs, Colorado.

David Brody is married to Lisette Dorianne Bassett-Brody. Together, they have three children.

Brody wrote the 2012 book The Teavangelicals: The Inside Story of How the Evangelicals and the Tea Party are Taking Back America. Brody co-authored the book The Faith of Donald J. Trump: A Spiritual Biography, with Scott Lamb of The Washington Times, and it was published in early 2018.
