= God Bless the U.S.A. Bible =

Edition of the King James Bible

Cover of the God Bless the U.S.A. Bible, featuring an American flag motif

The God Bless the U.S.A. Bible, also known as the Trump Bible, is an edition of the King James Version of the Christian Bible, alongside texts related to the foundation and politics of the United States such as the original Constitution of the United States and the Bill of Rights the Declaration of Independence, and the Pledge of Allegiance. It was criticized for excluding Constitutional Amendments Nos. 11 - 27. The compilation was created by country music singer-songwriter Lee Greenwood and first published in 2021. It was later marketed by Donald Trump under his brand name and promoted as part of his 2024 presidential campaign.

== History ==
In May 2021, to commemorate the 20th anniversary of the 2001 attack on the World Trade Center in New York, Greenwood published a "God Bless the U.S.A." edition of the Bible. It has the U.S. flag on its leather cover and includes texts of the Declaration of Independence, the original Constitution before amendments, the Bill of Rights, the Pledge of Allegiance, and the chorus of Greenwood's song "God Bless the USA" in Greenwood's own handwriting. The Bible translation was intended to be the New International Version, but Zondervan, the division of HarperCollins which owns the rights to the New International Version, withheld them after multiple public complaints, and the King James Version was used instead, as it is in the public domain in the United States.

The book created further controversy in 2024 when then-former President Donald Trump promoted a new edition. In March, Trump began promoting the Bible at a price point of $60, the website selling the book calling it "the only Bible endorsed by" Trump and that his "name, likeness and image" are being used under paid license from one of Trump's organizations, CIC Ventures LLC.

Trump's 2025 financial disclosure included royalty payments amounting to $1,306,035 for his endorsement of Greenwood's Bible.

== Criticism ==
The creation and sale of this Bible version has drawn criticism from various quarters due to its incorporation of documents specific to a single country, and assertions it is an effort to profit from a religious text. Charlotte, North Carolina Evangelical pastor Loran Livingston drew national attention when he preached a sermon denouncing the Trump Bible as "blasphemous" and "disgusting" for tying scripture to American politics. The Trump Bible was also noted to be missing Constitutional amendments 11–27 which include the abolition of slavery and women's right to vote. The publisher responded by saying they decided to "only include the original founding fathers’ documents, as Amendments 11-27 were added at later dates."

In June 2024, Oklahoma State Superintendent of Schools Ryan Walters issued a memo announcing that all public schools in Oklahoma would be required to teach the Bible, including the Ten Commandments, directing that "every teacher, every classroom in the state will have a Bible in the classroom and will be teaching from the Bible in the classroom." In September 2024, Walters opened bids to supply the Oklahoma State Department of Education with 55,000 Bibles. The bid documents required that "Bibles must be the King James Version; must contain the Old and New Testaments; must include copies of the Pledge of Allegiance, Declaration of Independence, U.S. Constitution and the Bill of Rights; and must be bound in leather or leather-like material." Under these conditions, eligible versions are the "God Bless the U.S.A. Bible" and the "We The People Bible" also endorsed by Donald Trump Jr. The two versions are sold for $60 and $90 despite far cheaper or free versions of the Bible being readily accessible. Multiple state legislators and a state school board member criticized Walters' proposal on both legal and constitutional grounds. Former Oklahoma Attorney General Drew Edmondson said that the request for proposals was not genuinely competitive and thus might violate state law. Democratic state senator Mary Boren criticized Walters' RFP as a flagrant violation of the separation of church and state (as guaranteed by the state's Constitution), and for favoring the KJV over other Bible translations (such as the Latin Catholic Bible, New International Version, or English Standard Version). Days after the criticisms arose, the RFP was revised to say the American founding documents may be included within or separately from the text of the Bible. Walters stated in a video, "The left-wing media hates Donald Trump so much, and they hate the Bible so much, they will lie and go to any means necessary to stop this initiative from happening."

The Associated Press reported in October 2024 that nearly 120,000 copies of the Bible were printed in Hangzhou, China, and shipped to the United States earlier in the year, at a cost of less than $3 per Bible.

CBS News reported that, along with Trump's other ventures during his campaign, the Bible raises potential conflicts of interest as they could be considered a campaign contribution.
