= Going, Going, Gone (Lee Greenwood song) =

Single by Lee Greenwood

from the album Somebody's Gonna Love You
- B-side: "Come on Back and Love Me Some More"
- Released: December 1983
- Genre: Country
- Length: 3:19
- Label: MCA
- Songwriter(s): Jan Crutchfield
- Producer(s): Jerry Crutchfield

Lee Greenwood singles chronology
| "Somebody's Gonna Love You" (1983) | "Going, Going, Gone" (1983) | "God Bless the U.S.A." (1984) |

"Going, Going, Gone" is a song written by Jan Crutchfield, and recorded by American country music artist Lee Greenwood. It was released in December 1983 as the third single from the album Somebody's Gonna Love You. The song was Greenwood's second number one on the country chart. The single went to number one for one week and spent twelve weeks on the country chart.

== Charts ==
=== Weekly charts ===
| Chart (1983–1984) | Peak position |
|---|---|
| US Hot Country Songs (Billboard) | 1 |
| Canadian RPM Country Tracks | 1 |

=== Year-end charts ===
| Chart (1984) | Position |
|---|---|
| US Hot Country Songs (Billboard) | 33 |
