= Somebody's Gonna Love You =

Single by Lee Greenwood

from the album Somebody's Gonna Love You
- B-side: "You're the Woman I Love"
- Released: July 1983
- Genre: Country
- Length: 3:42
- Label: MCA
- Songwriter(s): Rafe Van Hoy; Don Cook
- Producer(s): Jerry Crutchfield

Lee Greenwood singles chronology
"I.O.U." (1983)	"Somebody's Gonna Love You" (1983)	"Going, Going Gone" (1984)

"Somebody's Gonna Love You" is a song written by Rafe Van Hoy and Don Cook, and recorded by American country music artist Lee Greenwood. It was released in July 1983 as the second single and title track from the album Somebody's Gonna Love You. The song was Greenwood's sixth country hit and the first of his seven number ones on the country chart. The single went to number one for a week and spent a total of thirteen weeks on the country chart.

== Chart performance ==
Chart (1983)	Peak position
US Hot Country Songs (Billboard)	1
US Billboard Hot 100	96
Canadian RPM Country Tracks	2
