= Ain't No Trick (It Takes Magic) =

1982 single by Lee Greenwood

Single by Lee Greenwood

from the album Inside Out
- B-side: "Broken Pieces of My Heart"
- Released: December 11, 1982
- Genre: Country
- Length: 3:25
- Label: MCA
- Songwriters: Jim Hurt, Steve Pippin
- Producer: Jerry Crutchfield

Lee Greenwood singles chronology
"She's Lying" (1982)	"Ain't No Trick (It Takes Magic)" (1982)	"I.O.U." (1983)

"Ain't No Trick (It Takes Magic)" is a song written by Jim Hurt and Steve Pippin, and recorded by the American country music artist Lee Greenwood. It was released in December 1982 as the fourth single from the album Inside Out. The song reached #7 on the Billboard Hot Country Singles & Tracks chart.

== Chart performance ==
Chart (1982–1983)	Peak position
US Hot Country Songs (Billboard)	7
Canadian RPM Country Tracks	27
