= Ring on Her Finger, Time on Her Hands =

Song

Single by Lee Greenwood

from the album Inside Out
- B-side: "Don'cha Hear Me Callin'"
- Released: February 1982
- Genre: Country
- Length: 3:38
- Label: MCA 52026
- Songwriters: Don Goodman; Pam Rose; Mary Ann Kennedy
- Producer: Jerry Crutchfield

Lee Greenwood singles chronology
"It Turns Me Inside Out" (1981)	"Ring on Her Finger, Time on Her Hands" (1982)	"She's Lying" (1982)

"Ring on Her Finger, Time on Her Hands"

Single by Reba McEntire

from the album Starting Over
- B-side: "You Keep Me Hangin' On"
- Released: November 1995
- Genre: Country
- Length: 4:10
- Label: MCA 55161
- Songwriters: Don Goodman; Pam Rose; Mary Ann Kennedy
- Producers: Tony Brown; Reba McEntire

Reba McEntire singles chronology
"On My Own" (1995)	"Ring on Her Finger, Time on Her Hands" (1995)	"Starting Over Again" (1996)

"Ring on Her Finger, Time on Her Hands" is a song written by Don Goodman, Pam Rose, and Mary Ann Kennedy and first recorded by American country music artist Lee Greenwood. It was released in February 1982 as the second single from his album Inside Out. Greenwood's version peaked at number 5 on the Billboard Hot Country Singles chart. A cover was released by Reba McEntire in November 1995 as the second single from her album Starting Over. McEntire's version reached number 9 on the Billboard Hot Country Singles & Tracks chart in February 1996.

== Content ==
The song is about a married couple whose problems foreshadow the wife's decision to have an affair. The lyrics – mainly pronouns – are slightly changed, depending on whether the singer is a male or female.

The song begins with a young couple standing at the altar, promising to be faithful to one another for the rest of their lives. The bride recalls that, as pure as the white in her gown, she stood by her groom's side and vowed to love him until her death.

However, the couple's love life quickly sours, as the husband constantly leaves his wife alone at night; the reason – work, drinking with friends or an affair – is never specified. As the lonely nights begin to mount up, the wife, left to maintain in a three-bedroom home (or prison, as she puts it), observes that the "gold turned cold in (her) wedding band." Eventually, with the need and desire for physical intimacy still very much alive in her, she turns to a stranger to meet her sexual needs ("The arms of a stranger was the only place left to turn").

McEntire's version changes the pronouns to place the song in a female's perspective.

== Chart performance ==
=== Lee Greenwood version ===
Chart (1982)	Peak position
US Hot Country Songs (Billboard)	5
Canadian RPM Country Tracks	2

=== Year-end charts ===
Chart (1982)	Position
US Hot Country Songs (Billboard)	49

=== Reba McEntire version ===
Chart (1995–1996)	Peak position
Canada Country Singles (RPM)	14
US Hot Country Songs (Billboard)	9
