= It Turns Me Inside Out =

Single by Lee Greenwood

from the album Inside Out
- B-side: "Thank You for Changing My Life"
- Released: September 19, 1981
- Genre: Country
- Length: 3:37
- Label: MCA
- Songwriter(s): Jan Crutchfield
- Producer(s): Jerry Crutchfield

Lee Greenwood singles chronology
"It Turns Me Inside Out" (1981)	"Ring on Her Finger, Time on Her Hands" (1982)

"It Turns Me Inside Out" is a song written by Jan Crutchfield, and originally recorded by Conway Twitty on his 1981 album Southern Comfort. American country music artist Lee Greenwood released the song as his debut single in September 1981 and the first from his album Inside Out. The song reached No. 17 on the Billboard Hot Country Singles & Tracks chart.

== Chart performance ==
Chart (1981–1982)	Peak position
US Hot Country Songs (Billboard)	17
