= She's Lying =

Single by Lee Greenwood

from the album Inside Out
- B-side: "Home Away from Home"
- Released: August 7, 1982
- Genre: Country
- Length: 3:10
- Label: MCA
- Songwriter(s): Jan Crutchfield
- Producer(s): Jerry Crutchfield

Lee Greenwood singles chronology
"Ring on Her Finger, Time on Her Hands" (1982)	"She's Lying" (1982)	"Ain't No Trick (It Takes Magic)" (1983)

"She's Lying" is a song written by Jan Crutchfield, and recorded by American country music artist Lee Greenwood. It was released in August 1982 as the third single from the album Inside Out. The song reached #7 on the Billboard Hot Country Singles & Tracks chart.

== Chart performance ==
Chart (1982)	Peak position
US Hot Country Songs (Billboard)	7
Canadian RPM Country Tracks	6
