= God Bless the U.S.A. =

1984 single by Lee Greenwood

Single by Lee Greenwood

from the album You've Got a Good Love Comin'
- B-side: "This Old Bed"
- Released: May 21, 1984
- Recorded: November 1983
- Studio: Nashville, Tennessee
- Genre: Patriotic; Country
- Length: 3:10 (album & single versions); 5:30 (video version)
- Label: MCA Nashville
- Songwriter: Lee Greenwood
- Producer: Jerry Crutchfield

Lee Greenwood singles chronology
"Going, Going, Gone" (1983)	"God Bless the U.S.A." (1984)	"Fool's Gold" (1984)

Alternative cover
- 2001 re-release cover

Music video
- "God Bless the U. S .A." on YouTube

"God Bless the U.S.A." (also known as "Proud to Be an American") is an American patriotic song written and recorded by American country singer Lee Greenwood, and is considered to be his signature song. Released by MCA Nashville on May 21, 1984, it appeared on Greenwood's third album, You've Got a Good Love Comin'.

That summer, the song was included in a film about President Ronald Reagan, the Republican presidential nominee, that was shown at the 1984 Republican National Convention. "God Bless the U.S.A." gained prominence during the 1988 United States presidential election campaign, when Greenwood performed the song at the 1988 Republican National Convention and at rallies for the Republican nominee, George H. W. Bush. The song was also featured in television advertisements for Bush. The song became popular once more during the Gulf War in 1990 and 1991. As a result of its newfound popularity, Greenwood re-recorded the track for his 1992 album American Patriot.

The popularity of the song surged following the September 11 attacks and during the 2003 invasion of Iraq; after the former, the song was re-released as a single and peaked at number 16 on both the Billboard Hot 100 and Hot Country Songs charts in 2001. A re-recorded version of the song was released in 2003, under the "God Bless the U.S.A. 2003." The song platinum certification by the Recording Industry Association of America (RIAA)—signifying 1,000,000 units sold—by July 2015. The song experienced further popularity after another Republican president, Donald Trump, used it at campaign rallies.

== Background and writing ==
Greenwood wrote "God Bless the U.S.A." in response to his feelings about the shootdown of Korean Air Lines Flight 007. He said that he "wanted to write it my whole life. When I got to that point, we were doing 300 days a year on the road, and we were on our fourth or fifth album on MCA. I called my producer, and I said I have a need to do this. I've always wanted to write a song about America, and I said we just need to be more united." As for writing the song itself, Greenwood wrote that it more or less "wrote itself", and that the lyrics flowed naturally from the music as a reflection of his pride to be American.

The reason behind the cities chosen in the song Greenwood says, "I'm from California, and I don't know anybody from Virginia or New York, so when I wrote it—and my producer and I had talked about it—[we] talked about the four cities I wanted to mention, the four corners of the United States. It could have been Seattle or Miami but we chose New York City and Los Angeles, and he suggested Detroit and Houston because they both were economically part of the basis of our economy—Motortown and the oil industry, so I just poetically wrote that in the bridge."

Greenwood performed the song prior to Game 4 of the 2001 World Series.

== Content ==
In the song, the singer sings about how, if he were to lose everything he had and had to start again from scratch, he would do it in the United States because he believes his freedom is guaranteed in America. He remembers how other Americans in history had died to secure this freedom, and declares that if he is ever called upon to defend the US today, he will gladly stand up and fight because he loves the country.

== Music video ==
A music video was released for this song in 1984, depicting Greenwood as a farmer who loses the family farm. The video was produced and edited by L. A. Johnson and directed by Gary Burden. A second video was released in 1991, also on VHS, and was directed by Edd Griles. A third music video was also released after the September 11, 2001, attacks. A fourth music video in collaboration with U.S. Air Force Singing Sergeants and a cappella group Home Free was released on June 30, 2020.

== Personnel ==
Adapted from liner notes.

- Pete Bordonali - electric guitar
- Steve Gibson - acoustic guitar
- Lee Greenwood - lead vocals
- David Hungate - bass guitar
- Bobby Ogdin - keyboards
- Cindy Richardson - background vocals
- Hargus "Pig" Robbins - piano
- Lisa Silver - background vocals
- James Stroud - drums
- Diane Tidwell - background vocals
- Larry Gatlin and the Gatlin Brothers - background vocals (uncredited)

== Chart history ==
"God Bless the U.S.A." debuted on the Hot Country Singles & Tracks chart for the week of May 26, 1984.

Chart (1984)	Peak position
US Hot Country Songs (Billboard)	7
Chart (2001)	Peak position
US Billboard Hot 100	16
US Hot Country Songs (Billboard)	16
US Adult Contemporary (Billboard)	12
Chart (2020)	Peak position
US Digital Song Sales (Billboard)	1

== Certifications ==
Region	Certification	Certified units/sales
United States (RIAA)	2× Platinum	2,000,000^{‡}
United States (RIAA) Video single	Platinum	50,000^{^}
^{^} Shipments figures based on certification alone.^{‡} Sales+streaming figures based on certification alone.

== Other notable versions ==
=== Canadian version ===
In 1989, Greenwood released a Canadian version of the song called "God Bless You, Canada".

=== Jump5 version ===
Pop group Jump5 released a cover of "God Bless The U.S.A." in September 2001, as a tribute to the victims of the September 11 attacks. The cover was commissioned by Radio Disney, as at the time, the original version of "God Bless The U.S.A." was the network's most requested song, but Disney wanted a teen pop group to cover the song. The song was released as a CD single and as a bonus track on the Jump5 album's second reissue. Greenwood's lyrics "I'd worked for all my life […] with just my children and my wife / I'd thank my lucky stars" were changed by Jump5 to "I'd hoped for all my life […] with just my family by my side / I'd thank my God above" to better reflect the group's Christian values, and because the group consisted of two male and three female teenagers at the time of recording.

In 2002, the group performed the song for then-president George W. Bush at the White House. In 2003, a HitClips edit of the song was released, which could be purchased on its own or bundled with a music player. This edit's length is 1 minute and 6 seconds, and it consists of the chorus repeated twice, followed by a brief outtro.

A music video for "God Bless The U.S.A." by Jump5 was released online on February 8, 2002, and on home video on March 26, 2002.

=== Dolly Parton version ===
Dolly Parton recorded the song for her 2003 patriotic album, For God and Country. Altering the lyric: "And I had to start again with just my children and my wife" to "And I had to start again with just my family by my side", adapted from the Jump5 version.

=== American Idol finalists' version ===
In 2003, the song was performed by the American Idol season two finalists and released as a single, with part of the proceeds going to the American Red Cross. It raised $155,000 for the charity. It reached No. 4 on the Billboard Hot 100, and it was certified gold by the RIAA the same year.

=== Beyoncé version ===
Again, following the death of Osama bin Laden, Beyoncé re-released her 2008 cover of the song, the proceeds of which would go to charity. She performed the song on Piers Morgan Tonight on May 5, 2011. After the performance, her version was released as a single to the iTunes Store. In a statement she said, "I cannot think about anything more appropriate to do to help these families ... Almost 10 years [after 9/11], it is still so painful for all Americans, especially those who lost loved ones. We were all affected by the tragedies of 9/11 and continue to keep the families who lost loved ones close to our hearts ..." Dan Martin of The Guardian felt that the cover was "in contrast" to her last intervention in national affairs, the Let's Move! Flash Workout fitness initiative. Ronald Mitchell of Newsday commented that "It does our hearts good to see Beyoncé work her magic for the greater good." She later also performed the song for the concert she had on July 4, 2011, along with "Best Thing I Never Had" (2011). Nick Neyland of Prefix Magazine commented that "Beyoncé is a natural fit for occasions like this, and she doesn't even break a sweat as she hits the high notes despite the soaring temperatures and humidity in the city. That's the mark of a true pro." In Beyoncé's version, the end of the second verse is sung "And it's time to make a change", as well as changing, "If I had to start again with just my children and my wife" to "family by my side", adapted from Jump5 and Parton's respective versions.

=== Home Free version ===
Country a cappella group Home Free has been performing the song ever since the band's inception in 2000, and released an official music video on July 22, 2016. As of July 11, 2025, the music video has amassed over 15 million views on YouTube. In 2020, Home Free worked in the studio with Greenwood and re-recorded the song with him and the United States Air Force Band Singing Sergeants. The music was released on July 1 on Home Free's channel.

=== Rock version ===
Greenwood released a rock version of the song with fellow country artist Drew Jacobs on November 1, 2024, to celebrate the 40th anniversary of the song and the victory of Donald Trump in the 2024 United States presidential election. The song opened at number two on Billboard's Digital Song Sales chart following the election.

== "God Bless The U.S.A." Bible ==
In 2024, Greenwood and President Donald Trump collaborated to release themed King James Bibles "inspired by" the song. Each Bible includes "the U.S. Constitution, the Bill of Rights, the Declaration of Independence and the Pledge of Allegiance, as well as a handwritten chorus of the famous Greenwood song". The associated website claims that the Bible is "not political" or linked to his 2024 presidential campaign, but also describes it as the only Bible endorsed by Trump.

== See also ==
- "God Bless America", song written by Irving Berlin
- Ronald Reagan in music
