= Jan Crutchfield =

American country singer (1938–2012)

- Born: February 26, 1938; Paducah, Kentucky, U.S.
- Died: October 30, 2012 (aged 74) Nashville, Tennessee, U.S.
- Genres: Country
- Years active: 1960s–2010s

Jan Crutchfield (February 26, 1938 – October 30, 2012) was an American country music singer and songwriter. He is best known for writing "Statue of a Fool", which was first recorded in 1969 by Jack Greene and was a No. 1 hit on the Hot Country Songs charts for him. Versions of the song by Brian Collins and Ricky Van Shelton also charted in the top 10.

Other notable compositions written by Crutchfield include "Tear Time" by Dave & Sugar and several singles by Lee Greenwood, including "She's Lying", "It Turns Me Inside Out", and "Going, Going, Gone".

Crutchfield died on October 30, 2012.

His brother, Jerry Crutchfield, was a record producer who also worked with Greenwood.
