= Mel McDaniel discography =

This is the discography for American country musician Mel McDaniel.

== Studio albums ==
Year	Album details	Peak chart positions
Year	Album details	US Country
1977	Gentle to Your Senses: Release date: October 1977; Label: Capitol Records	45
1978	Mello: Release date: July 17, 1978; Label: Capitol Records	—
1980	I'm Countryfied: Release date: November 10, 1980; Label: Capitol Records	24
1982	Take Me to the Country: Release date: April 5, 1982; Label: Capitol Records	43
1983	Naturally Country: Release date: April 8, 1983; Label: Capitol Records	63
1984	Mel McDaniel with Oklahoma Wind: Release date: February 17, 1984; Label: Capitol Records	64
1985	Let It Roll: Release date: February 22, 1985; Label: Capitol Records	4
1985	Stand Up: Release date: September 13, 1985; Label: Capitol Records	25
1986	Just Can't Sit Down Music: Release date: September 19, 1986; Label: Capitol Records	—
1988	Now You're Talkin': Release date: January 13, 1988; Label: Capitol Records	51
1989	Rock-a-billy Boy: Release date: January 11, 1989; Label: Capitol Records	—
1991	Country Pride: Release date: May 13, 1991; Label: DPI Records	—
2006	Reloaded: Release date: April 25, 2006; Label: Stand UP / Aspirion Records	—
"—" denotes releases that did not chart

== Compilation albums ==
Year	Album details	Peak chart positions
Year	Album details	US Country
1987	Greatest Hits: Release date: June 19, 1987; Label: Capitol Records	43
1993	Baby's Got Her Blue Jeans On: Release date: July 7, 1993; Label: Branson Records	—
"—" denotes releases that did not chart

== Singles ==
Year	Single	Peak positions		Album
Year	Single	US Country	CAN Country	Album
1975	"Lazy Me"	—	—	—N/a
1976	"Have a Dream on Me"	51	—	—N/a
1976	"I Thank God She Isn't Mine"	70	—	—N/a
1977	"All the Sweet"	39	—	—N/a
1977	"Gentle to Your Senses"	18	—	Gentle to Your Senses
1977	"Soul of a Honky Tonk Woman"	27	—	Gentle to Your Senses
1977	"God Made Love"	11	12	Gentle to Your Senses
1978	"The Farm"	80	—	Mello
1978	"Bordertown Woman"	26	56	Mello
1979	"Love Lies"	33	38	—N/a
1979	"Play Her Back to Yesterday"	24	23	—N/a
1979	"Lovin' Starts Where Friendship Ends"	27	39	—N/a
1980	"Hello Daddy, Good Morning Darling"	39	—	I'm Countryfied
1980	"Countryfied"	23	—	I'm Countryfied
1981	"Louisiana Saturday Night"	7	21	I'm Countryfied
1981	"Right in the Palm of Your Hand"	10	17	I'm Countryfied
1981	"Preaching Up a Storm"	19	37	Take Me to the Country
1982	"Take Me to the Country"	10	22	Take Me to the Country
1982	"Big Ole Brew"	4	4	Take Me to the Country
1982	"I Wish I Was in Nashville"	20	—	Take Me to the Country
1983	"Old Man River (I've Come to Talk Again)"	22	31	Naturally Country
1983	"Hot Time in Old Town Tonight"	39	—	Naturally Country
1983	"I Call It Love"	9	29	Mel McDaniel with Oklahoma Wind
1984	"Where'd That Woman Go"	49	—	Mel McDaniel with Oklahoma Wind
1984	"Most of All I Remember You"	59	—	Mel McDaniel with Oklahoma Wind
1984	"All Around the Water Tank"	64	—	Mel McDaniel with Oklahoma Wind
1984	"Baby's Got Her Blue Jeans On"	1	1	Let It Roll
1985	"Let It Roll (Let It Rock)"	6	6	Let It Roll
1985	"Stand Up"	5	3	Stand Up
1986	"Shoe String"	22	18	Stand Up
1986	"Doctor's Orders"	53	47	Stand Up
1986	"Stand on It"	12	5	Just Can't Sit Down Music
1987	"Oh What a Night"	56	—	Just Can't Sit Down Music
1987	"Anger & Tears"	49	32	Greatest Hits
1987	"Love Is Everywhere"	60	57	Greatest Hits
1987	"Now You're Talkin'"	64	42	Now You're Talkin'
1988	"Ride This Train"	58	—	Now You're Talkin'
1988	"Real Good Feel Good Song"	9	4	Now You're Talkin'
1988	"Henrietta"	62	*	Now You're Talkin'
1989	"Walk That Way"	54	*	Rock-a-Billy Boy
1989	"Blue Suede Blues"	70	68	Rock-a-Billy Boy
1989	"You Can't Play the Blues (In an Air-Conditioned Room)"	80	57	Rock-a-Billy Boy
1991	"Turtles and Rabbits"	—	—	Country Pride
2006	"Horseshoes & Hand Grenades"	—	—	Reloaded
"—" denotes releases that did not chart * denotes unknown peak positions

== Music videos ==
Year	Video	Director
1985	"Let It Roll (Let It Rock)"	George Bloom III
1985	"Stand Up"	George Bloom III
1988	"Real Good Feel Good Song"	Kenneth Brown
1988	"Henrietta"	George Bloom III
1988	"Bye Bye Johnny"	George Bloom III
1991	"Turtles and Rabbits"	Stan Moore
1991	"My Ex-Life"	Carolyn Betts/Matt Coale
