= Honest Lullaby =

Studio album by Joan Baez
- Released: July 1979
- Recorded: 1979
- Genre: Folk
- Label: Portrait
- Producer: Barry Beckett

Joan Baez chronology
The Joan Baez Country Music Album (1979)	Honest Lullaby (1979)	Live Europe '83 (1984)

Professional ratings
Review scores
Source	Rating
AllMusic	3/5 stars
MusicHound Folk: The Essential Album Guide	3/5 stars
The Rolling Stone Album Guide	2.5/5 stars

Honest Lullaby is a studio album by the American musician Joan Baez, released in 1979. It was her final album on CBS Records' Portrait imprint; it also stood as her last studio album issued in the U.S. until the release of her 1987 album, Recently.

The autobiographical title song was written for her son, Gabriel Harris. It was performed on The Muppet Show in 1980. In addition to her own compositions, the album contained work by Janis Ian and Jackson Browne. "Let Your Love Flow" was originally a 1976 hit for the Bellamy Brothers. In her 1987 memoir, And a Voice to Sing With, Baez speculated that she was likely dropped from CBS due to a political disagreement she'd had with the label's then-president.

Baez dedicated the album to the memory of journalist John L. Wasserman. (Wasserman, who had died the previous February, had written the liner notes to Baez's 1977 compilation, The Best of Joan C. Baez).

The cover photos were taken by photographer Yousuf Karsh.

== Track listing ==
1. "Let Your Love Flow" (Larry E. Williams)
2. "No Woman No Cry" (Vincent Ford)
3. "Light a Light" (Janis Ian)
4. "Song at the End of the Movie" (Pierce Pettis)
5. "Before the Deluge" (Jackson Browne)
6. "Honest Lullaby" (Joan Baez)
7. "Michael" (Joan Baez)
8. "For Sasha" (Joan Baez)
9. "For All We Know" (Sam M. Lewis, J. Fred Coots)
10. "Free at Last" (Baez, George Jackson)

== Personnel ==
- Joan Baez – lead vocals, acoustic guitar (5–8)
- Larry Byrom – acoustic guitar (1,3,7)
- Pete Carr – acoustic guitar (2,4,5,7), electric guitar (3)
- Jimmy Johnson – electric guitar (1–3, 4)
- Barry Beckett – keyboards (1–3, 5–7,9,10)
- David Hood – bass guitar (1–7)
- Roger Hawkins – drums (1–3, 5–6)
- Hill Abrahams – violin (4)
- James Crozier – cello (4)
- Charlie McCoy – harmonica (4)
- Ava Aldridge – background vocals
- George Jackson – background vocals
- Lenny LeBlanc – background vocals
- Mac McAnally – background vocals
- Cindy Richardson – background vocals
- George Soulé – background vocals
- Eddie Struzick – background vocals
- Marie Tomlinson – background vocals
