= Burning the Ballroom Down =

Studio album by Amazing Rhythm Aces
- Released: 1978
- Studio: Jack Clement, Nashville, Tennessee
- Genre: Country rock
- Label: ABC
- Producer: Barry "Byrd" Burton

Amazing Rhythm Aces chronology
Toucan Do It Too (1977)	Burning the Ballroom Down (1978)	The Amazing Rhythm Aces (1979)

Professional ratings
Review scores
Source	Rating
AllMusic	4/5 stars
The Village Voice	B−

Burning the Ballroom Down is the fourth album by American country rock group the Amazing Rhythm Aces, released in 1978 on the ABC label. It reached No. 28 on the US country chart and No. 166 on the Billboard albums chart. (As with other albums by the group, it fell into the category of albums which were critically acclaimed, but sold poorly). The cover art is a book illustration by Danish artist Kay Nielsen titled "The Lovers Perish in Fire".

In 2000, Burning the Ballroom Down was reissued by the Special Products Division of Sony Music in the USA on a two-for-one CD which also contains the group's third album Toucan Do It Too.

== Track listing ==
1. "Burning the Ballroom Down" (Russell Smith, James H.Brown Jr.) – 5:20
2. "A Jackass Gets His Oats" (Russell Smith, James H. Brown Jr.) – 4:53
3. "Ashes of Love" (Jim Anglin, Jack Anglin, Johnnie Wright) – 3:03
4. "All That I Had Left (Left With You)" (Jeff Davis) – 3:32
5. "I Pity the Mother and the Father (When the Kids Move Away)" (Russell Smith) – 2:07
6. "Della's Long Brown Hair" (Russell Smith) – 3:13
7. "Out of Control" (Billy Earheart) – 3:53
8. "Red to Blue (When Dreams Come True)" (Russell Smith) – 5:18
9. "The Spirit Walk" (Russell Smith, James H. Brown Jr.) – 6:01

== Personnel ==
- Russell Smith – lead and backing vocals, guitars, percussion
- Barry "Byrd" Burton – guitars, backing vocals, mandolin
- Billy Earheart – organ
- James B. Hooker – piano, backing vocals
- Jeff Davis – bass, backing vocals
- Butch McDade – drums, backing vocals, percussion
