= Too Stuffed to Jump =

Studio album by Amazing Rhythm Aces
- Released: 1976
- Studio: Sam Phillips, Memphis, Tennessee
- Label: ABC
- Producer: Barry "Byrd" Burton

Amazing Rhythm Aces chronology
Stacked Deck (1975)	Too Stuffed to Jump (1976)	Toucan Do It Too (1977)

Too Stuffed to Jump is an album by the Amazing Rhythm Aces, released in 1976 with a funny album cover of a frog riding a wooden motorcycle.

"The End Is Not in Sight (The Cowboy Tune)" won the 1977 Grammy Award for "Country Vocal Performance by a Group". The song reached No. 20 on the Canadian country charts and #69 on the pop charts.

In 2000, Too Stuffed to Jump was reissued by the Special Products Division of Sony Music in the USA on a two-for-one CD which also contained the group's debut album Stacked Deck.

== Critical reception ==
Professional ratings
Review scores
Source	Rating
AllMusic	4.5/5 stars
The Rolling Stone Record Guide	3/5 stars
The Village Voice	B−

In 2013, Dave Dimartino of Rolling Stone called the album "near classic" and said that it sounded "more contemporary than anyone might expect."

== Track listing ==
(All tracks written by Russell Smith unless stated)

1. "Typical American Boy" 3:30 (Russell Smith, James H. Brown Jr.)
2. "If I Just Knew What to Say" 2:08 (Stuart Wright)
3. "The End Is Not in Sight (The Cowboy Tune)" 3:46
4. "Same Ol' Me" (Butch McDade) 2:25
5. "These Dreams of Losing You" 3:30 (Russell Smith, James H. Brown Jr.)
6. "I'll Be Gone" 2:56
7. "Out of the Snow" 3:40
8. "Fool for the Woman" 2:44
9. "A Little Italy Rag" 2:22
10. "Dancing the Night Away" 5:39 (Russell Smith, James H. Brown Jr.)

== Personnel ==
- Russell Smith — lead vocals, rhythm guitar
- Barry "Bird" Burton – lead guitar, backing vocals, mandolin, autoharp, pedal steel guitar
- Billy Earhart – organ
- James Hooker – piano, backing vocals
- Jeff Davis – bass, backing vocals
- Butch McDade – drums, backing vocals, percussion; lead vocals on "Same Ol' Me"
