= Amazing Grace (Used to Be Her Favorite Song) =

Single by Amazing Rhythm Aces

from the album Stacked Deck
- B-side: "The Beautiful Lie"
- Released: December 1975
- Studio: Phillips Recording, Memphis, Tennessee
- Genre: Country rock
- Length: 3:17
- Label: ABC
- Songwriter: Russell Smith
- Producer: Barry Burton

Amazing Rhythm Aces singles chronology
"Third Rate Romance" (1975)	"Amazing Grace (Used to Be Her Favorite Song)" (1975)	"The End Is Not in Sight (The Cowboy Tune)" (1976)

"Amazing Grace (Used to Be Her Favorite Song)" is a song written by Russell Smith, first recorded in Montreal in 1974 by Jesse Winchester and his band the Rhythm Aces, assisted by Smith. During the winter of 1976, it became a hit by the Amazing Rhythm Aces on their 1975 album Stacked Deck. It was the band's follow-up single to their debut hit "Third Rate Romance."

The song reached #9 on the U.S. country singles chart and #72 on the Billboard Hot 100. It charted very similarly in Canada.

== Content ==
The song is a cautionary tale against the dangers of alcoholism. It also teaches a second moral lesson, prompting the listener to consider the effects of negative personal influences in the lives of others, especially within the context of close relationships.

In the song, a husband accepts the blame for introducing his wife to a lifestyle of alcohol and partying through her desire to change him by doing what pleased him. He describes her previously as a "good girl" and an "angel," with "Amazing Grace" as her favorite song. But after suffering neglect from his devotion to many late nights out drinking, over time she herself falls harder to the power of his bad habits and ultimately leaves him.

== Chart performance ==
Chart (1975–76)	Peak position
Canada Country Singles (RPM)	10
Canada Top Singles (RPM)	79
US Hot Country Songs (Billboard)	9
US Billboard Hot 100	72
US Cash Box Top 100	77
