= Third Rate Romance =

1975 single by Amazing Rhythm Aces

Single by Amazing Rhythm Aces

from the album Stacked Deck
- B-side: "Mystery Train"
- Released: June 23, 1975
- Studio: Phillips Recording, Memphis, Tennessee
- Genre: Country rock
- Length: 3:17
- Label: ABC
- Songwriter: Russell Smith
- Producer: Barry Burton

Amazing Rhythm Aces singles chronology
"Third Rate Romance" (1975)	"Amazing Grace (Used to Be Her Favorite Song)" (1975)

"Third Rate Romance" is a song written by Russell Smith, first recorded in Montreal in 1974 by Jesse Winchester and his band the Rhythm Aces, assisted by Smith. It became a hit the following year by the newly re-formed Amazing Rhythm Aces on its 1975 album Stacked Deck. It was the band's debut single, reaching No.11 on the U.S. country singles chart and No.14 on the Billboard Hot 100, as well as No.1 on the Canadian RPM Country Tracks and Top Singles charts.

== Content ==
The third-person lyrics tell the story of a man and woman who meet at a restaurant and depart together for what presumably will prove to be a one-night stand at a motel (the "Family Inn"). At the door of the room, she nervously says, "I've never really done this kind of thing before—have you?" He admits that he has, "but only a time or two."

== Chart performance ==
=== Weekly charts ===
Chart (1975)	Peak position
Canada Adult Contemporary (RPM)	2
Canada Country Singles (RPM)	1
Canada Top Singles (RPM)	1
New Zealand (RIANZ)	18
US Hot Country Songs (Billboard)	11
US Billboard Hot 100	14
US Billboard Adult Contemporary	33

=== Year-end charts ===
Chart (1975)	Rank
Canada RPM Top Singles	27
US Billboard Hot 100	97

== Sammy Kershaw version ==
"Third Rate Romance"

Single by Sammy Kershaw

from the album Feelin' Good Train
- B-side: "Paradise from Nine to One"
- Released: August 30, 1994
- Genre: Country
- Length: 3:21
- Label: Mercury Nashville
- Songwriter: Russell Smith
- Producers: Buddy Cannon, Norro Wilson

Sammy Kershaw singles chronology
"National Working Woman's Holiday" (1994)	"Third Rate Romance" (1994)	"Southbound" (1995)

American country music artist Sammy Kershaw covered the song on his 1994 album Feelin' Good Train, from which it was released as a single in 1994. It peaked at No.2 in the United States country charts and at No.10 in Canada. Russell Smith provided backing vocals on Kershaw's version.

=== Music video ===
The music video was directed by Michael Merriman, and premiered in late 1994. It features a woman luring an older man into going to a motel with her. She steals his money and watch and then drives off with another man, as the old man tries to chase them down.

=== Chart performance ===
Chart (1994)	Peak position
Canada Country Singles (RPM)	10
US Bubbling Under Hot 100 (Billboard)	5
US Hot Country Songs (Billboard)	2

== Other versions ==
- Jesse Winchester - on his 1974 album Learn to Love It.
- Ace Spectrum recorded a more funky take on their 1975 album Low Rent Rendezvous.
- Elvis Costello - as a demo in 1975 on the album known as the "Flip City Demos"
- Tom Jones recorded it in 1976.
- Rosanne Cash - on her 1982 album Somewhere in the Stars.
- Fabulous Poodles - on their 1978 album Unsuitable.
- Another version was performed on The Earl Scruggs Review Anniversary Special (1975).
