= List of number-one singles in Rhodesia =

Rhodesia was an unrecognised state in southern Africa from 1965 to 1979, equivalent in territory to modern Zimbabwe. This article lists number-one singles on Rhodesia's music chart, the Lyons Maid Hits of the Week, broadcast by Radio 1. Its rankings were based on weekly sales. In the late 1960s and early 1970s the chart included both singles and LPs, but later only singles were included.

== 1965 ==
Rhodesia declared independence on 11 November 1965. Previously, it was the self-governing territory of Southern Rhodesia.

Date	Artist	Single	Weeks at #1
2 January	The Beatles	"I Feel Fine"	5 weeks
9 January	The Beatles	"I Feel Fine"	5 weeks
16 January	The Beatles	"I Feel Fine"	5 weeks
23 January	The Beatles	"I Feel Fine"	5 weeks
30 January	The Beatles	"I Feel Fine"	5 weeks
6 February	Petula Clark	"Downtown"	5 weeks
13 February	Petula Clark	"Downtown"	5 weeks
20 February	Petula Clark	"Downtown"	5 weeks
27 February	Petula Clark	"Downtown"	5 weeks
6 March	Petula Clark	"Downtown"	5 weeks
13 March	Cliff Richard and The Shadows	"I Could Easily Fall (In Love with You)"	5 weeks
20 March	Cliff Richard and The Shadows	"I Could Easily Fall (In Love with You)"	5 weeks
27 March	Cliff Richard and The Shadows	"I Could Easily Fall (In Love with You)"	5 weeks
3 April	Cliff Richard and The Shadows	"I Could Easily Fall (In Love with You)"	5 weeks
10 April	Cliff Richard and The Shadows	"I Could Easily Fall (In Love with You)"	5 weeks
17 April	The Beatles	"Rock n' Roll Music"	4 weeks
24 April	The Beatles	"Rock n' Roll Music"	4 weeks
1 May	The Beatles	"Rock n' Roll Music"	4 weeks
8 May	The Beatles	"Rock n' Roll Music"	4 weeks
15 May	The Rolling Stones	"The Last Time"	1 week
22 May	The Beatles	"Ticket to Ride"	3 weeks
29 May	The Beatles	"Ticket to Ride"	3 weeks
5 June	The Beatles	"Ticket to Ride"	3 weeks
12 June	The Seekers	"I'll Never Find Another You"	6 weeks
19 June	The Seekers	"I'll Never Find Another You"	6 weeks
26 June	The Seekers	"I'll Never Find Another You"	6 weeks
3 July	The Seekers	"I'll Never Find Another You"	6 weeks
10 July	The Seekers	"I'll Never Find Another You"	6 weeks
17 July	The Seekers	"I'll Never Find Another You"	6 weeks
24 July	The Seekers	"A World of Our Own"	3 weeks
31 July	The Seekers	"A World of Our Own"	3 weeks
7 August	The Seekers	"A World of Our Own"	3 weeks
14 August	The Beatles	"Help!"	1 week
21 August	The Byrds	"Mr. Tambourine Man"	6 weeks
28 August	The Byrds	"Mr. Tambourine Man"	6 weeks
4 September	The Byrds	"Mr. Tambourine Man"	6 weeks
11 September	The Byrds	"Mr. Tambourine Man"	6 weeks
18 September	The Byrds	"Mr. Tambourine Man"	6 weeks
25 September	The Byrds	"Mr. Tambourine Man"	6 weeks
2 October	Murray Campbell	"Goodbye My Love (Il Silenzio)"	8 weeks
9 October	Murray Campbell	"Goodbye My Love (Il Silenzio)"	8 weeks
16 October	Murray Campbell	"Goodbye My Love (Il Silenzio)"	8 weeks
23 October	Murray Campbell	"Goodbye My Love (Il Silenzio)"	8 weeks
30 October	Murray Campbell	"Goodbye My Love (Il Silenzio)"	8 weeks
6 November	Murray Campbell	"Goodbye My Love (Il Silenzio)"	8 weeks
13 November	Murray Campbell	"Goodbye My Love (Il Silenzio)"	8 weeks
20 November	Murray Campbell	"Goodbye My Love (Il Silenzio)"	8 weeks
27 November	The Animals	"We Gotta Get out of This Place"	2 weeks
4 December	The Animals	"We Gotta Get out of This Place"	2 weeks
11 December	The Hollies	"Look Through Any Window"	1 week
18 December	The Rolling Stones	"Get Off of My Cloud"	3 weeks
25 December	No chart released		

== 1966 ==
Date	Artist	Single	Weeks at #1
1 January	The Rolling Stones	"Get Off of My Cloud"	3 weeks
8 January (tied at #1)	The Rolling Stones	"Get Off of My Cloud"	3 weeks
8 January (tied at #1)	The Beatles	"We Can Work It Out"	6 weeks
15 January	The Beatles	"We Can Work It Out"	6 weeks
22 January	The Beatles	"We Can Work It Out"	6 weeks
29 January	The Beatles	"We Can Work It Out"	6 weeks
5 February	The Beatles	"We Can Work It Out"	6 weeks
12 February (tied at #1)	The Beatles	"We Can Work It Out"	6 weeks
12 February (tied at #1)	The Byrds	"Turn! Turn! Turn!"	1 week
19 February	The Seekers	"The Carnival Is Over"	3 weeks
26 February	The Seekers	"The Carnival Is Over"	3 weeks
5 March	The Seekers	"The Carnival Is Over"	3 weeks
12 March	The Beatles	Rubber Soul (LP)	2 weeks
19 March	The Beatles	Rubber Soul (LP)	2 weeks
26 March	Nancy Sinatra	"These Boots Are Made for Walkin'"	10 weeks
2 April	Nancy Sinatra	"These Boots Are Made for Walkin'"	10 weeks
9 April	Nancy Sinatra	"These Boots Are Made for Walkin'"	10 weeks
16 April	Nancy Sinatra	"These Boots Are Made for Walkin'"	10 weeks
23 April	Nancy Sinatra	"These Boots Are Made for Walkin'"	10 weeks
30 April	Nancy Sinatra	"These Boots Are Made for Walkin'"	10 weeks
7 May	Nancy Sinatra	"These Boots Are Made for Walkin'"	10 weeks
14 May	Nancy Sinatra	"These Boots Are Made for Walkin'"	10 weeks
21 May	Nancy Sinatra	"These Boots Are Made for Walkin'"	10 weeks
28 May	Nancy Sinatra	"These Boots Are Made for Walkin'"	10 weeks
4 June	Val Doonican	"Elusive Butterfly"	2 weeks
11 June	Val Doonican	"Elusive Butterfly"	2 weeks
18 June	Manfred Mann	"Pretty Flamingo"	2 weeks
25 June	Manfred Mann	"Pretty Flamingo"	2 weeks
2 July	Crispian St. Peters	"The Pied Piper"	3 weeks
9 July	Crispian St. Peters	"The Pied Piper"	3 weeks
16 July	Crispian St. Peters	"The Pied Piper"	3 weeks
23 July	Ray Conniff Singers	"Somewhere, My Love"	4 weeks
30 July	Ray Conniff Singers	"Somewhere, My Love"	4 weeks
6 August	Ray Conniff Singers	"Somewhere, My Love"	4 weeks
13 August	Ray Conniff Singers	"Somewhere, My Love"	4 weeks
20 August	Dickie Loader and the Blue Jeans	"Sea of Heartbreak"	3 weeks
27 August	Dickie Loader and the Blue Jeans	"Sea of Heartbreak"	3 weeks
3 September	Dickie Loader and the Blue Jeans	"Sea of Heartbreak"	3 weeks
10 September	Nick Taylor	"U.D.I. Song"	4 weeks
17 September	Nick Taylor	"U.D.I. Song"	4 weeks
24 September	Nick Taylor	"U.D.I. Song"	4 weeks
1 October	Nick Taylor	"U.D.I. Song"	4 weeks
8 October	The Troggs	"With a Girl Like You"	3 weeks
15 October	The Troggs	"With a Girl Like You"	3 weeks
22 October	The Troggs	"With a Girl Like You"	3 weeks
29 October	Tommy Roe	"Sweet Pea"	3 weeks
5 November	Tommy Roe	"Sweet Pea"	3 weeks
12 November	Tommy Roe	"Sweet Pea"	3 weeks
19 November	Dave Dee, Dozy, Beaky, Mick & Tich	"Bend It!"	2 weeks
26 November	Dave Dee, Dozy, Beaky, Mick & Tich	"Bend It!"	2 weeks
3 December	The Troggs	"I Can't Control Myself"	5 weeks
10 December	The Troggs	"I Can't Control Myself"	5 weeks
17 December	The Troggs	"I Can't Control Myself"	5 weeks
24 December	The Troggs	"I Can't Control Myself"	5 weeks
31 December	The Troggs	"I Can't Control Myself"	5 weeks

== 1967 ==
Date	Artist	Single	Weeks at #1
7 January	Manfred Mann	"Semi-Detached, Suburban Mr. James"	1 week
14 January	The Beach Boys	"Good Vibrations"	3 weeks
21 January	The Beach Boys	"Good Vibrations"	3 weeks
28 January	The Beach Boys	"Good Vibrations"	3 weeks
4 February	Tom Jones	"Green, Green Grass of Home"	3 weeks
11 February	Tom Jones	"Green, Green Grass of Home"	3 weeks
18 February	Tom Jones	"Green, Green Grass of Home"	3 weeks
25 February	The Monkees	"I'm a Believer"	2 weeks
4 March	The Monkees	"I'm a Believer"	2 weeks
11 March	The Royal Guardsmen	"Snoopy vs. the Red Baron"	4 weeks
18 March	The Royal Guardsmen	"Snoopy vs. the Red Baron"	4 weeks
25 March	The Royal Guardsmen	"Snoopy vs. the Red Baron"	4 weeks
1 April	The Royal Guardsmen	"Snoopy vs. the Red Baron"	4 weeks
8 April	The New Vaudeville Band	"There's a Kind of Hush"	3 weeks
15 April	The New Vaudeville Band	"There's a Kind of Hush"	3 weeks
22 April	The New Vaudeville Band	"There's a Kind of Hush"	3 weeks
29 April	Petula Clark	"This Is My Song"	2 weeks
6 May	Petula Clark	"This Is My Song"	2 weeks
13 May	Frank Sinatra & Nancy Sinatra	"Somethin' Stupid"	1 week
20 May	Sandy Posey	"Single Girl"	2 weeks
27 May	Sandy Posey	"Single Girl"	2 weeks
3 June	Sandie Shaw	"Puppet on a String"	4 weeks
10 June	Sandie Shaw	"Puppet on a String"	4 weeks
17 June	Sandie Shaw	"Puppet on a String"	4 weeks
24 June	Sandie Shaw	"Puppet on a String"	4 weeks
1 July	The Tremeloes	"Silence Is Golden"	6 weeks
8 July	The Tremeloes	"Silence Is Golden"	6 weeks
15 July	The Tremeloes	"Silence Is Golden"	6 weeks
22 July	The Tremeloes	"Silence Is Golden"	6 weeks
29 July	The Tremeloes	"Silence Is Golden"	6 weeks
5 August	The Tremeloes	"Silence Is Golden"	6 weeks
12 August	The Turtles	"She'd Rather Be with Me"	2 weeks
19 August	The Turtles	"She'd Rather Be with Me"	2 weeks
26 August	Scott McKenzie	"San Francisco (Be Sure to Wear Flowers in Your Hair)"	3 weeks
2 September	Scott McKenzie	"San Francisco (Be Sure to Wear Flowers in Your Hair)"	3 weeks
9 September	Scott McKenzie	"San Francisco (Be Sure to Wear Flowers in Your Hair)"	3 weeks
16 September	The Hollies	"Carrie Anne"	2 weeks
23 September	The Hollies	"Carrie Anne"	2 weeks
30 September	The Beatles	"All You Need Is Love"	2 weeks
7 October	The Beatles	"All You Need Is Love"	2 weeks
14 October	The Tremeloes	"Even The Bad Times Are Good"	2 weeks
21 October	The Tremeloes	"Even The Bad Times Are Good"	2 weeks
28 October	Cliff Richard	"I'll Come Runnin"	1 week
4 November	The Dominos	"Tabitha Twitchit"	2 weeks
11 November	The Dominos	"Tabitha Twitchit"	2 weeks
18 November	The Hollies	"That's My Desire"	1 week
25 November	Bobby Vee and The Strangers	"Come Back When You Grow Up"	1 week
2 December	Bee Gees	"Massachusetts"	6 weeks
9 December	Bee Gees	"Massachusetts"	6 weeks
16 December	Bee Gees	"Massachusetts"	6 weeks
23 December	Bee Gees	"Massachusetts"	6 weeks
30 December	Bee Gees	"Massachusetts"	6 weeks

== 1968 ==
Date	Artist	Single	Weeks at #1
6 January	Bee Gees	"Massachusetts"	6 weeks
13 January	The Monkees	"Daydream Believer"	5 weeks
20 January	The Monkees	"Daydream Believer"	5 weeks
27 January	The Monkees	"Daydream Believer"	5 weeks
3 February	The Monkees	"Daydream Believer"	5 weeks
10 February	The Monkees	"Daydream Believer"	5 weeks
17 February	The Troggs	"Love Is All Around"	2 weeks
24 February	The Troggs	"Love Is All Around"	2 weeks
2 March	Four Jacks and a Jill	"Master Jack"	3 weeks
9 March	Four Jacks and a Jill	"Master Jack"	3 weeks
16 March	Four Jacks and a Jill	"Master Jack"	3 weeks
23 March	The American Breed	"Bend Me, Shape Me"	2 weeks
30 March	The American Breed	"Bend Me, Shape Me"	2 weeks
6 April	Dave Dee, Dozy, Beaky, Mick & Tich	"The Legend of Xanadu"	4 weeks
13 April	Dave Dee, Dozy, Beaky, Mick & Tich	"The Legend of Xanadu"	4 weeks
20 April	Dave Dee, Dozy, Beaky, Mick & Tich	"The Legend of Xanadu"	4 weeks
27 April	Dave Dee, Dozy, Beaky, Mick & Tich	"The Legend of Xanadu"	4 weeks
4 May	1910 Fruitgum Company	"Simon Says"	2 weeks
11 May	1910 Fruitgum Company	"Simon Says"	2 weeks
18 May	Louis Armstrong	"What a Wonderful World"	4 weeks
25 May	Louis Armstrong	"What a Wonderful World"	4 weeks
1 June	Louis Armstrong	"What a Wonderful World"	4 weeks
8 June	Louis Armstrong	"What a Wonderful World"	4 weeks
15 June	Bobby Goldsboro	"Honey"	3 weeks
22 June	Bobby Goldsboro	"Honey"	3 weeks
29 June	Bobby Goldsboro	"Honey"	3 weeks
6 July	Quentin E. Klopjaeger With The Gonks	"Lazy Life"	3 weeks
13 July	Quentin E. Klopjaeger With The Gonks	"Lazy Life"	3 weeks
20 July	Quentin E. Klopjaeger With The Gonks	"Lazy Life"	3 weeks
27 July	John Rowles	"If I Only Had Time"	3 weeks
3 August	John Rowles	"If I Only Had Time"	3 weeks
10 August	John Rowles	"If I Only Had Time"	3 weeks
17 August	Al Debbo & Nico Carstens	"Baas Jack"	1 week
24 August	Ohio Express	"Yummy Yummy Yummy"	1 week
31 August	The Equals	"Baby, Come Back"	1 week
7 September	Missing		
14 September	Percy Sledge	"Take Time to Know Her"	2 weeks
21 September	Percy Sledge	"Take Time to Know Her"	2 weeks
28 September	The Flames	"For Your Precious Love"	3 weeks
5 October	The Flames	"For Your Precious Love"	3 weeks
12 October	The Flames	"For Your Precious Love"	3 weeks
19 October	The Beatles	"Hey Jude"	4 weeks
26 October	The Beatles	"Hey Jude"	4 weeks
2 November	The Beatles	"Hey Jude"	4 weeks
9 November	The Beatles	"Hey Jude"	4 weeks
16 November (tied at #1)	Cornelia	"Picking Up Pebbles"	1 week
16 November (tied at #1)	Leapy Lee	"Little Arrows"	9 weeks
23 November	Leapy Lee	"Little Arrows"	9 weeks
30 November	Leapy Lee	"Little Arrows"	9 weeks
7 December	Leapy Lee	"Little Arrows"	9 weeks
14 December	Leapy Lee	"Little Arrows"	9 weeks
21 December	Leapy Lee	"Little Arrows"	9 weeks
28 December	Leapy Lee	"Little Arrows"	9 weeks

== 1969 ==
Date	Artist	Single	Weeks at #1
4 January	Leapy Lee	"Little Arrows"	9 weeks
11 January	Leapy Lee	"Little Arrows"	9 weeks
18 January	The Royal Guardsmen	"Biplane Evermore"	3 weeks
25 January	The Royal Guardsmen	"Biplane Evermore"	3 weeks
1 February	The Royal Guardsmen	"Biplane Evermore"	3 weeks
8 February	Marmalade	"Ob-La-Di, Ob-La-Da"	2 weeks
15 February	Marmalade	"Ob-La-Di, Ob-La-Da"	2 weeks
22 February	Barry Ryan With The Majority	"Eloise"	4 weeks
1 March	Barry Ryan With The Majority	"Eloise"	4 weeks
8 March	Barry Ryan With The Majority	"Eloise"	4 weeks
15 March	Barry Ryan With The Majority	"Eloise"	4 weeks
22 March	Tommy James and the Shondells	"Crimson and Clover"	7 weeks
29 March	Tommy James and the Shondells	"Crimson and Clover"	7 weeks
5 April	Tommy James and the Shondells	"Crimson and Clover"	7 weeks
12 April	Tommy James and the Shondells	"Crimson and Clover"	7 weeks
19 April	Tommy James and the Shondells	"Crimson and Clover"	7 weeks
26 April	Tommy James and the Shondells	"Crimson and Clover"	7 weeks
3 May	Tommy James and the Shondells	"Crimson and Clover"	7 weeks
10 May	Peter Sarstedt	"Where Do You Go To (My Lovely)?"	2 weeks
17 May	Peter Sarstedt	"Where Do You Go To (My Lovely)?"	2 weeks
24 May	The Hollies	"Sorry Suzanne"	1 week
31 May	The Beatles & Billy Preston	"Get Back"	5 weeks
7 June	The Beatles & Billy Preston	"Get Back"	5 weeks
14 June	The Beatles & Billy Preston	"Get Back"	5 weeks
21 June	The Beatles & Billy Preston	"Get Back"	5 weeks
28 June	The Beatles & Billy Preston	"Get Back"	5 weeks
5 July	Elvis Presley	"In the Ghetto"	4 weeks
12 July	Elvis Presley	"In the Ghetto"	4 weeks
19 July	Elvis Presley	"In the Ghetto"	4 weeks
26 July	Elvis Presley	"In the Ghetto"	4 weeks
2 August	Herman's Hermits	"My Sentimental Friend"	2 weeks
9 August	Herman's Hermits	"My Sentimental Friend"	2 weeks
16 August	The Archies	"Sugar, Sugar"	2 weeks
23 August	The Archies	"Sugar, Sugar"	2 weeks
30 August	Creedence Clearwater Revival	"Bad Moon Rising"	4 weeks
6 September	Creedence Clearwater Revival	"Bad Moon Rising"	4 weeks
13 September	Creedence Clearwater Revival	"Bad Moon Rising"	4 weeks
20 September	Creedence Clearwater Revival	"Bad Moon Rising"	4 weeks
27 September	Robin Gibb	"Saved by the Bell"	2 weeks
4 October	Robin Gibb	"Saved by the Bell"	2 weeks
11 October	The Brooklyn Bridge	"Welcome Me Love"	3 weeks
18 October	The Brooklyn Bridge	"Welcome Me Love"	3 weeks
25 October	The Brooklyn Bridge	"Welcome Me Love"	3 weeks
1 November	The Box Tops	"Soul Deep"	1 week
8 November	Bee Gees	"Don't Forget to Remember"	1 week
15 November	Elvis Presley	"Suspicious Minds"	3 weeks
22 November	Elvis Presley	"Suspicious Minds"	3 weeks
29 November	Elvis Presley	"Suspicious Minds"	3 weeks
6 December	Dave Mills	"Theresa"	3 weeks
13 December	Dave Mills	"Theresa"	3 weeks
20 December	Dave Mills	"Theresa"	3 weeks
27 December	The Beatles	Abbey Road (LP)	6 weeks

== 1970 ==
Date	Artist	Single	Weeks at #1
3 January	The Beatles	Abbey Road (LP)	6 weeks
10 January	The Beatles	Abbey Road (LP)	6 weeks
17 January	The Beatles	Abbey Road (LP)	6 weeks
24 January	The Beatles	Abbey Road (LP)	6 weeks
31 January	The Beatles	Abbey Road (LP)	6 weeks
7 February	R. B. Greaves	"Take a Letter Maria"	1 week
14 February	Chris Andrews	"Pretty Belinda"	4 weeks
21 February	Chris Andrews	"Pretty Belinda"	4 weeks
28 February	Chris Andrews	"Pretty Belinda"	4 weeks
7 March	Chris Andrews	"Pretty Belinda"	4 weeks
14 March	The Hollies	"He Ain't Heavy, He's My Brother"	2 weeks
21 March	The Hollies	"He Ain't Heavy, He's My Brother"	2 weeks
28 March	B. J. Thomas	"Raindrops Keep Fallin' on My Head"	4 weeks
4 April	B. J. Thomas	"Raindrops Keep Fallin' on My Head"	4 weeks
11 April	B. J. Thomas	"Raindrops Keep Fallin' on My Head"	4 weeks
18 April	B. J. Thomas	"Raindrops Keep Fallin' on My Head"	4 weeks
25 April	Simon & Garfunkel	Bridge over Troubled Water (LP)	4 weeks
2 May	Simon & Garfunkel	Bridge over Troubled Water (LP)	4 weeks
9 May	Simon & Garfunkel	Bridge over Troubled Water (LP)	4 weeks
16 May	Simon & Garfunkel	Bridge over Troubled Water (LP)	4 weeks
23 May	Chris Andrews	"Carol OK"	5 weeks
30 May	Chris Andrews	"Carol OK"	5 weeks
6 June	Chris Andrews	"Carol OK"	5 weeks
13 June	Chris Andrews	"Carol OK"	5 weeks
20 June	Chris Andrews	"Carol OK"	5 weeks
27 June	Creedence Clearwater Revival	"Travelin' Band"	1 week
4 July	Creedence Clearwater Revival	"Up Around the Bend"	2 weeks
11 July	Creedence Clearwater Revival	"Up Around the Bend"	2 weeks
18 July	Christie	"Yellow River"	2 weeks
25 July	Christie	"Yellow River"	2 weeks
1 August	Jody Wayne	"The Wedding"	3 weeks
8 August	Jody Wayne	"The Wedding"	3 weeks
15 August	Jody Wayne	"The Wedding"	3 weeks
22 August	Mungo Jerry	"In the Summertime"	8 weeks
29 August	Mungo Jerry	"In the Summertime"	8 weeks
5 September	Mungo Jerry	"In the Summertime"	8 weeks
12 September	Mungo Jerry	"In the Summertime"	8 weeks
19 September	Mungo Jerry	"In the Summertime"	8 weeks
26 September	Mungo Jerry	"In the Summertime"	8 weeks
3 October	Mungo Jerry	"In the Summertime"	8 weeks
10 October	Mungo Jerry	"In the Summertime"	8 weeks
17 October	Cliff Richard	"Goodbye Sam, Hello Samantha"	1 week
24 October	Chris Andrews	"Brown Eyes"	4 weeks
31 October	Chris Andrews	"Brown Eyes"	4 weeks
7 November	Chris Andrews	"Brown Eyes"	4 weeks
14 November	Chris Andrews	"Brown Eyes"	4 weeks
21 November	Creedence Clearwater Revival	"Lookin' Out My Back Door"	2 weeks
28 November	Creedence Clearwater Revival	"Lookin' Out My Back Door"	2 weeks
5 December	Michael Holm	"Mademoiselle Ninette"	1 week
12 December	Neil Diamond	"Cracklin' Rosie"	5 weeks
19 December	Neil Diamond	"Cracklin' Rosie"	5 weeks
26 December	Neil Diamond	"Cracklin' Rosie"	5 weeks

== 1971 ==
Date	Artist	Single	Weeks at #1
2 January	Neil Diamond	"Cracklin' Rosie"	5 weeks
9 January	Neil Diamond	"Cracklin' Rosie"	5 weeks
16 January	Chris Andrews	"Yo Yo"	4 weeks
23 January	Chris Andrews	"Yo Yo"	4 weeks
30 January	Chris Andrews	"Yo Yo"	4 weeks
6 February	Chris Andrews	"Yo Yo"	4 weeks
13 February	Dawn	"Candida"	1 week
20 February	Dave Edmunds	"I Hear You Knocking"	3 weeks
27 February	Dave Edmunds	"I Hear You Knocking"	3 weeks
6 March	Dave Edmunds	"I Hear You Knocking"	3 weeks
13 March	The Dealians	"Look Out, Here Comes Tomorrow"	1 week
20 March	Lynn Anderson	"Rose Garden"	2 weeks
27 March	Lynn Anderson	"Rose Garden"	2 weeks
3 April	Creedence Clearwater Revival	"Have You Ever Seen the Rain?"	3 weeks
10 April	Creedence Clearwater Revival	"Have You Ever Seen the Rain?"	3 weeks
17 April	Creedence Clearwater Revival	"Have You Ever Seen the Rain?"	3 weeks
24 April	George Harrison	"My Sweet Lord"	1 week
1 May	Steve Montgomery	"Morning"	3 weeks
8 May	Steve Montgomery	"Morning"	3 weeks
15 May	Steve Montgomery	"Morning"	3 weeks
22 May	Peanut Butter Conspiracy	"Understanding"	3 weeks
29 May	Peanut Butter Conspiracy	"Understanding"	3 weeks
5 June	Peanut Butter Conspiracy	"Understanding"	3 weeks
12 June	Alan Garrity	"Put Your Hand in the Hand"	5 weeks
19 June	Alan Garrity	"Put Your Hand in the Hand"	5 weeks
26 June	Alan Garrity	"Put Your Hand in the Hand"	5 weeks
3 July	Alan Garrity	"Put Your Hand in the Hand"	5 weeks
10 July	Alan Garrity	"Put Your Hand in the Hand"	5 weeks
17 July	Three Dog Night	"Joy to the World"	4 weeks
24 July	Three Dog Night	"Joy to the World"	4 weeks
31 July	Three Dog Night	"Joy to the World"	4 weeks
7 August	Three Dog Night	"Joy to the World"	4 weeks
14 August	Lally Stott	"Chirpy Chirpy Cheep Cheep"	4 weeks
21 August	Lally Stott	"Chirpy Chirpy Cheep Cheep"	4 weeks
28 August	Lally Stott	"Chirpy Chirpy Cheep Cheep"	4 weeks
4 September	Lally Stott	"Chirpy Chirpy Cheep Cheep"	4 weeks
11 September	The Sweet	"Co-Co"	5 weeks
18 September	The Sweet	"Co-Co"	5 weeks
25 September	The Sweet	"Co-Co"	5 weeks
2 October	The Sweet	"Co-Co"	5 weeks
9 October	The Sweet	"Co-Co"	5 weeks
16 October	New World	"Tom-Tom Turnaround"	3 weeks
23 October	New World	"Tom-Tom Turnaround"	3 weeks
30 October	New World	"Tom-Tom Turnaround"	3 weeks
6 November	The New Seekers	"Never Ending Song of Love"	2 weeks
13 November	The New Seekers	"Never Ending Song of Love"	2 weeks
20 November	Charisma	"Mammy Blue"	8 weeks
27 November	Charisma	"Mammy Blue"	8 weeks
4 December	Charisma	"Mammy Blue"	8 weeks
11 December	Charisma	"Mammy Blue"	8 weeks
18 December	Charisma	"Mammy Blue"	8 weeks
25 December	No chart		

== 1972 ==
Date	Artist	Single	Weeks at #1
1 January	Charisma	"Mammy Blue"	8 weeks
8 January	Charisma	"Mammy Blue"	8 weeks
15 January	Charisma	"Mammy Blue"	8 weeks
22 January	Peanut Butter Conspiracy	"Amen"	1 week
29 January	Middle of the Road	"Soley Soley"	5 weeks
5 February	Middle of the Road	"Soley Soley"	5 weeks
12 February	Middle of the Road	"Soley Soley"	5 weeks
19 February	Middle of the Road	"Soley Soley"	5 weeks
26 February	Middle of the Road	"Soley Soley"	5 weeks
4 March	Melanie	"Brand New Key"	3 weeks
11 March	Melanie	"Brand New Key"	3 weeks
18 March	Melanie	"Brand New Key"	3 weeks
25 March	The Congregation	"Softly Whispering I Love You"	3 weeks
1 April	The Congregation	"Softly Whispering I Love You"	3 weeks
8 April	The Congregation	"Softly Whispering I Love You"	3 weeks
15 April	Paul Simon	"Mother and Child Reunion"	7 weeks
22 April	Paul Simon	"Mother and Child Reunion"	7 weeks
29 April	Paul Simon	"Mother and Child Reunion"	7 weeks
6 May	Paul Simon	"Mother and Child Reunion"	7 weeks
13 May	Paul Simon	"Mother and Child Reunion"	7 weeks
20 May	Paul Simon	"Mother and Child Reunion"	7 weeks
27 May	Paul Simon	"Mother and Child Reunion"	7 weeks
3 June	Royal Scots Dragoon Guards	"Amazing Grace"	3 weeks
10 June	Royal Scots Dragoon Guards	"Amazing Grace"	3 weeks
17 June	Royal Scots Dragoon Guards	"Amazing Grace"	3 weeks
24 June	Daniel Boone	"Beautiful Sunday"	8 weeks
1 July	Daniel Boone	"Beautiful Sunday"	8 weeks
8 July	Daniel Boone	"Beautiful Sunday"	8 weeks
15 July	Daniel Boone	"Beautiful Sunday"	8 weeks
22 July	Daniel Boone	"Beautiful Sunday"	8 weeks
29 July	Daniel Boone	"Beautiful Sunday"	8 weeks
5 August	Daniel Boone	"Beautiful Sunday"	8 weeks
12 August	Daniel Boone	"Beautiful Sunday"	8 weeks
19 August	Neil Reid	"Mother of Mine"	4 weeks
26 August	Neil Reid	"Mother of Mine"	4 weeks
2 September	Neil Reid	"Mother of Mine"	4 weeks
9 September	Neil Reid	"Mother of Mine"	4 weeks
16 September	Neil Diamond	"Song Sung Blue"	3 weeks
23 September	Neil Diamond	"Song Sung Blue"	3 weeks
30 September	Neil Diamond	"Song Sung Blue"	3 weeks
7 October	Donny Osmond	"Puppy Love"	3 weeks
14 October	Donny Osmond	"Puppy Love"	3 weeks
21 October	Donny Osmond	"Puppy Love"	3 weeks
28 October	Gallery	"Nice to Be With You"	1 week
4 November	Johnny Nash	"I Can See Clearly Now"	5 weeks
11 November	Johnny Nash	"I Can See Clearly Now"	5 weeks
18 November	Johnny Nash	"I Can See Clearly Now"	5 weeks
25 November	Johnny Nash	"I Can See Clearly Now"	5 weeks
2 December	Johnny Nash	"I Can See Clearly Now"	5 weeks
9 December	The Sweet	"Wig-Wam Bam"	5 weeks
16 December	The Sweet	"Wig-Wam Bam"	5 weeks
23 December	The Sweet	"Wig-Wam Bam"	5 weeks
30 December	No chart		

== 1973 ==
Date	Artist	Single	Weeks at #1
6 January	The Sweet	"Wig-Wam Bam"	5 weeks
13 January	The Sweet	"Wig-Wam Bam"	5 weeks
20 January	The Partridge Family	"Breaking Up Is Hard to Do"	2 weeks
27 January	The Partridge Family	"Breaking Up Is Hard to Do"	2 weeks
3 February	Gert Potgieter	"Cheryl Moana Marie"	4 weeks
10 February	Gert Potgieter	"Cheryl Moana Marie"	4 weeks
17 February	Gert Potgieter	"Cheryl Moana Marie"	4 weeks
24 February	Gert Potgieter	"Cheryl Moana Marie"	4 weeks
3 March	Lobo	"I'd Love You to Want Me"	6 weeks
10 March	Lobo	"I'd Love You to Want Me"	6 weeks
17 March	Lobo	"I'd Love You to Want Me"	6 weeks
24 March	Lobo	"I'd Love You to Want Me"	6 weeks
31 March	Lobo	"I'd Love You to Want Me"	6 weeks
7 April	Lobo	"I'd Love You to Want Me"	6 weeks
14 April	Barbara Ray	"I Don't Wanna Play House"	2 weeks
21 April	Barbara Ray	"I Don't Wanna Play House"	2 weeks
28 April	Little Jimmy Osmond	"Long Haired Lover from Liverpool"	6 weeks
5 May	Little Jimmy Osmond	"Long Haired Lover from Liverpool"	6 weeks
12 May	Little Jimmy Osmond	"Long Haired Lover from Liverpool"	6 weeks
19 May	Little Jimmy Osmond	"Long Haired Lover from Liverpool"	6 weeks
26 May	Little Jimmy Osmond	"Long Haired Lover from Liverpool"	6 weeks
2 June	Little Jimmy Osmond	"Long Haired Lover from Liverpool"	6 weeks
9 June	Maureen McGovern	"The Morning After"	3 weeks
16 June	Maureen McGovern	"The Morning After"	3 weeks
23 June	Maureen McGovern	"The Morning After"	3 weeks
30 June	Dawn	"Tie a Yellow Ribbon Round the Ole Oak Tree"	9 weeks
7 July	Dawn	"Tie a Yellow Ribbon Round the Ole Oak Tree"	9 weeks
14 July	Dawn	"Tie a Yellow Ribbon Round the Ole Oak Tree"	9 weeks
21 July	Dawn	"Tie a Yellow Ribbon Round the Ole Oak Tree"	9 weeks
28 July	Dawn	"Tie a Yellow Ribbon Round the Ole Oak Tree"	9 weeks
4 August	Dawn	"Tie a Yellow Ribbon Round the Ole Oak Tree"	9 weeks
11 August	Dawn	"Tie a Yellow Ribbon Round the Ole Oak Tree"	9 weeks
18 August	Dawn	"Tie a Yellow Ribbon Round the Ole Oak Tree"	9 weeks
25 August	Dawn	"Tie a Yellow Ribbon Round the Ole Oak Tree"	9 weeks
1 September	Gary Glitter	"Hello, Hello, I'm Back Again"	9 weeks
8 September	Gary Glitter	"Hello, Hello, I'm Back Again"	9 weeks
15 September	Gary Glitter	"Hello, Hello, I'm Back Again"	9 weeks
22 September	Gary Glitter	"Hello, Hello, I'm Back Again"	9 weeks
29 September	Gary Glitter	"Hello, Hello, I'm Back Again"	9 weeks
6 October	Gary Glitter	"Hello, Hello, I'm Back Again"	9 weeks
13 October	Gary Glitter	"Hello, Hello, I'm Back Again"	9 weeks
20 October	Gary Glitter	"Hello, Hello, I'm Back Again"	9 weeks
27 October	Gary Glitter	"Hello, Hello, I'm Back Again"	9 weeks
3 November	Maria	"Clap Your Hands And Stamp Your Feet"	4 weeks
10 November	Maria	"Clap Your Hands And Stamp Your Feet"	4 weeks
17 November	Maria	"Clap Your Hands And Stamp Your Feet"	4 weeks
24 November	Maria	"Clap Your Hands And Stamp Your Feet"	4 weeks
1 December	Tony Orlando and Dawn	"Say, Has Anybody Seen My Sweet Gypsy Rose"	1 week
8 December	Gwynneth Ashley Robin	"Little Jimmy"	2 weeks
15 December	Gwynneth Ashley Robin	"Little Jimmy"	2 weeks
22 December	Demis Roussos	"Forever and Ever"	3 weeks
29 December	No chart		

== 1974 ==
Date	Artist	Single	Weeks at #1
5 January	Demis Roussos	"Forever and Ever"	3 weeks
12 January	Demis Roussos	"Forever and Ever"	3 weeks
19 January	Jessica Jones	"Waikiki Man"	6 weeks
26 January	Jessica Jones	"Waikiki Man"	6 weeks
2 February	Jessica Jones	"Waikiki Man"	6 weeks
9 February	Jessica Jones	"Waikiki Man"	6 weeks
16 February	Jessica Jones	"Waikiki Man"	6 weeks
23 February	Jessica Jones	"Waikiki Man"	6 weeks
2 March	Marie Osmond	"Paper Roses"	6 weeks
9 March	Marie Osmond	"Paper Roses"	6 weeks
16 March	Marie Osmond	"Paper Roses"	6 weeks
23 March	Marie Osmond	"Paper Roses"	6 weeks
30 March	Marie Osmond	"Paper Roses"	6 weeks
6 April	Marie Osmond	"Paper Roses"	6 weeks
13 April	Ike & Tina Turner	"Nutbush City Limits"	2 weeks
20 April	Ike & Tina Turner	"Nutbush City Limits"	2 weeks
27 April	The New Seekers	"You Won't Find Another Fool Like Me"	4 weeks
4 May	The New Seekers	"You Won't Find Another Fool Like Me"	4 weeks
11 May	The New Seekers	"You Won't Find Another Fool Like Me"	4 weeks
18 May	The New Seekers	"You Won't Find Another Fool Like Me"	4 weeks
25 May	Terry Jacks	"Seasons in the Sun"	5 weeks
1 June	Terry Jacks	"Seasons in the Sun"	5 weeks
8 June	Terry Jacks	"Seasons in the Sun"	5 weeks
15 June	Terry Jacks	"Seasons in the Sun"	5 weeks
22 June	Terry Jacks	"Seasons in the Sun"	5 weeks
29 June	Alvin Stardust	"My Coo Ca Choo"	5 weeks
6 July	Alvin Stardust	"My Coo Ca Choo"	5 weeks
13 July	Alvin Stardust	"My Coo Ca Choo"	5 weeks
20 July	Alvin Stardust	"My Coo Ca Choo"	5 weeks
27 July	Alvin Stardust	"My Coo Ca Choo"	5 weeks
3 August	Charlie Rich	"The Most Beautiful Girl"	4 weeks
10 August	Charlie Rich	"The Most Beautiful Girl"	4 weeks
17 August	Charlie Rich	"The Most Beautiful Girl"	4 weeks
24 August	Charlie Rich	"The Most Beautiful Girl"	4 weeks
31 August	The Rubettes	"Sugar Baby Love"	5 weeks
7 September	The Rubettes	"Sugar Baby Love"	5 weeks
14 September	The Rubettes	"Sugar Baby Love"	5 weeks
21 September	The Rubettes	"Sugar Baby Love"	5 weeks
28 September	The Rubettes	"Sugar Baby Love"	5 weeks
5 October	Teach-In	"Fly Away"	1 week
12 October	George McCrae	"Rock Your Baby"	5 weeks
19 October	George McCrae	"Rock Your Baby"	5 weeks
26 October	George McCrae	"Rock Your Baby"	5 weeks
2 November	George McCrae	"Rock Your Baby"	5 weeks
9 November	George McCrae	"Rock Your Baby"	5 weeks
16 November	The Hues Corporation	"Rock the Boat"	3 weeks
23 November	The Hues Corporation	"Rock the Boat"	3 weeks
30 November	The Hues Corporation	"Rock the Boat"	3 weeks
7 December	Peters and Lee	"Don't Stay Away Too Long"	2 weeks
14 December	Peters and Lee	"Don't Stay Away Too Long"	2 weeks
21 December	Carl Douglas	"Kung Fu Fighting"	6 weeks
28 December	No chart		

== 1975 ==
Date	Artist	Single	Weeks at #1
4 January	Carl Douglas	"Kung Fu Fighting"	6 weeks
11 January	Carl Douglas	"Kung Fu Fighting"	6 weeks
18 January	Carl Douglas	"Kung Fu Fighting"	6 weeks
25 January	Carl Douglas	"Kung Fu Fighting"	6 weeks
1 February	Carl Douglas	"Kung Fu Fighting"	6 weeks
8 February	Big John's Rock and Roll Circus	"Rockin' in the USA"	4 weeks
15 February	Big John's Rock and Roll Circus	"Rockin' in the USA"	4 weeks
22 February	Big John's Rock and Roll Circus	"Rockin' in the USA"	4 weeks
1 March	Big John's Rock and Roll Circus	"Rockin' in the USA"	4 weeks
8 March	KC and the Sunshine Band	"Queen of Clubs"	1 week
15 March	David Essex	"Gonna Make You a Star"	4 weeks
22 March	David Essex	"Gonna Make You a Star"	4 weeks
29 March	David Essex	"Gonna Make You a Star"	4 weeks
5 April	David Essex	"Gonna Make You a Star"	4 weeks
12 April	The Three Degrees	"When Will I See You Again"	2 weeks
19 April	The Three Degrees	"When Will I See You Again"	2 weeks
26 April	Bachman–Turner Overdrive	"You Ain't Seen Nothing Yet"	2 weeks
3 May	Bachman–Turner Overdrive	"You Ain't Seen Nothing Yet"	2 weeks
10 May	Ipi N'tombi ft. Margaret Singana	"Mama Tembu's Wedding"	10 weeks
17 May	Ipi N'tombi ft. Margaret Singana	"Mama Tembu's Wedding"	10 weeks
24 May	Ipi N'tombi ft. Margaret Singana	"Mama Tembu's Wedding"	10 weeks
31 May	Ipi N'tombi ft. Margaret Singana	"Mama Tembu's Wedding"	10 weeks
7 June	Ipi N'tombi ft. Margaret Singana	"Mama Tembu's Wedding"	10 weeks
14 June	Ipi N'tombi ft. Margaret Singana	"Mama Tembu's Wedding"	10 weeks
21 June	Ipi N'tombi ft. Margaret Singana	"Mama Tembu's Wedding"	10 weeks
28 June	Ipi N'tombi ft. Margaret Singana	"Mama Tembu's Wedding"	10 weeks
5 July	Ipi N'tombi ft. Margaret Singana	"Mama Tembu's Wedding"	10 weeks
12 July	Ipi N'tombi ft. Margaret Singana	"Mama Tembu's Wedding"	10 weeks
19 July	Barry Manilow	"Mandy"	4 weeks
26 July	Barry Manilow	"Mandy"	4 weeks
2 August	Barry Manilow	"Mandy"	4 weeks
9 August	Barry Manilow	"Mandy"	4 weeks
16 August	Bay City Rollers	"Bye, Bye, Baby"	1 week
23 August	The Carpenters	"Only Yesterday"	1 week
30 August	Paul Anka	"One Man Woman/One Woman Man"	6 weeks
6 September	Paul Anka	"One Man Woman/One Woman Man"	6 weeks
13 September	Paul Anka	"One Man Woman/One Woman Man"	6 weeks
20 September	Paul Anka	"One Man Woman/One Woman Man"	6 weeks
27 September	Paul Anka	"One Man Woman/One Woman Man"	6 weeks
4 October	Paul Anka	"One Man Woman/One Woman Man"	6 weeks
11 October	America	"Sister Golden Hair"	7 weeks
18 October	America	"Sister Golden Hair"	7 weeks
25 October	America	"Sister Golden Hair"	7 weeks
1 November	America	"Sister Golden Hair"	7 weeks
8 November	America	"Sister Golden Hair"	7 weeks
15 November	America	"Sister Golden Hair"	7 weeks
22 November	America	"Sister Golden Hair"	7 weeks
29 November	Rod Stewart	"Sailing"	5 weeks
6 December	Rod Stewart	"Sailing"	5 weeks
13 December	Rod Stewart	"Sailing"	5 weeks
20 December	Rod Stewart	"Sailing"	5 weeks
27 December	No chart		

== 1976 ==
Date	Artist	Single	Weeks at #1
3 January	Rod Stewart	"Sailing"	5 weeks
10 January	David Essex	"Hold Me Close"	5 weeks
17 January	David Essex	"Hold Me Close"	5 weeks
24 January	David Essex	"Hold Me Close"	5 weeks
31 January	David Essex	"Hold Me Close"	5 weeks
7 February	David Essex	"Hold Me Close"	5 weeks
14 February	Johnny Nash	"Tears on My Pillow"	3 weeks
21 February	Johnny Nash	"Tears on My Pillow"	3 weeks
28 February	Johnny Nash	"Tears on My Pillow"	3 weeks
6 March	Roger Whittaker	"The Last Farewell"	11 weeks
13 March	Roger Whittaker	"The Last Farewell"	11 weeks
20 March	Roger Whittaker	"The Last Farewell"	11 weeks
27 March	Roger Whittaker	"The Last Farewell"	11 weeks
3 April	Roger Whittaker	"The Last Farewell"	11 weeks
10 April	Roger Whittaker	"The Last Farewell"	11 weeks
17 April	Roger Whittaker	"The Last Farewell"	11 weeks
24 April	Roger Whittaker	"The Last Farewell"	11 weeks
1 May	Roger Whittaker	"The Last Farewell"	11 weeks
8 May	Roger Whittaker	"The Last Farewell"	11 weeks
15 May	Roger Whittaker	"The Last Farewell"	11 weeks
22 May	Joe Dolan	"Lady in Blue"	1 week
29 May	Max Merritt & The Meteors	"Slipping Away"	3 weeks
5 June	Max Merritt & The Meteors	"Slipping Away"	3 weeks
12 June	Max Merritt & The Meteors	"Slipping Away"	3 weeks
19 June	The Bellamy Brothers	"Let Your Love Flow"	17 weeks
26 June	The Bellamy Brothers	"Let Your Love Flow"	17 weeks
3 July	The Bellamy Brothers	"Let Your Love Flow"	17 weeks
10 July	The Bellamy Brothers	"Let Your Love Flow"	17 weeks
17 July	The Bellamy Brothers	"Let Your Love Flow"	17 weeks
24 July	The Bellamy Brothers	"Let Your Love Flow"	17 weeks
31 July	The Bellamy Brothers	"Let Your Love Flow"	17 weeks
7 August	The Bellamy Brothers	"Let Your Love Flow"	17 weeks
14 August	The Bellamy Brothers	"Let Your Love Flow"	17 weeks
21 August	The Bellamy Brothers	"Let Your Love Flow"	17 weeks
28 August	The Bellamy Brothers	"Let Your Love Flow"	17 weeks
4 September	The Bellamy Brothers	"Let Your Love Flow"	17 weeks
11 September	The Bellamy Brothers	"Let Your Love Flow"	17 weeks
18 September	The Bellamy Brothers	"Let Your Love Flow"	17 weeks
25 September	The Bellamy Brothers	"Let Your Love Flow"	17 weeks
2 October	The Bellamy Brothers	"Let Your Love Flow"	17 weeks
9 October	The Bellamy Brothers	"Let Your Love Flow"	17 weeks
16 October	Elton John & Kiki Dee	"Don't Go Breaking My Heart"	10 weeks
23 October	Elton John & Kiki Dee	"Don't Go Breaking My Heart"	10 weeks
30 October	Elton John & Kiki Dee	"Don't Go Breaking My Heart"	10 weeks
6 November	Elton John & Kiki Dee	"Don't Go Breaking My Heart"	10 weeks
13 November	Elton John & Kiki Dee	"Don't Go Breaking My Heart"	10 weeks
20 November	Elton John & Kiki Dee	"Don't Go Breaking My Heart"	10 weeks
27 November	Elton John & Kiki Dee	"Don't Go Breaking My Heart"	10 weeks
4 December	Elton John & Kiki Dee	"Don't Go Breaking My Heart"	10 weeks
11 December	Elton John & Kiki Dee	"Don't Go Breaking My Heart"	10 weeks
18 December	Elton John & Kiki Dee	"Don't Go Breaking My Heart"	10 weeks
25 December	No chart		

== 1977 ==
Date	Artist	Single	Weeks at #1
1 January	No chart		
8 January	ABBA	"Dancing Queen"	4 weeks
15 January	ABBA	"Dancing Queen"	4 weeks
22 January	ABBA	"Dancing Queen"	4 weeks
29 January	ABBA	"Dancing Queen"	4 weeks
5 February	David Dundas	"Jeans On"	6 weeks
12 February	David Dundas	"Jeans On"	6 weeks
19 February	David Dundas	"Jeans On"	6 weeks
26 February	David Dundas	"Jeans On"	6 weeks
5 March	David Dundas	"Jeans On"	6 weeks
12 March	David Dundas	"Jeans On"	6 weeks
19 March	The Kittens (Note: Because of sanctions imposed by EMI, records by their artists were not sold in Rhodesia/Zimbabwe until 1981, so the song, originally by Pussycat, was recorded for release in Rhodesia by a cover band.)	"Mississippi"	1 week
26 March	Leo Sayer	"You Make Me Feel Like Dancing"	5 weeks
2 April	Leo Sayer	"You Make Me Feel Like Dancing"	5 weeks
9 April	Leo Sayer	"You Make Me Feel Like Dancing"	5 weeks
16 April	Leo Sayer	"You Make Me Feel Like Dancing"	5 weeks
23 April	Leo Sayer	"You Make Me Feel Like Dancing"	5 weeks
30 April	Dana	"Fairytale"	4 weeks
7 May	Dana	"Fairytale"	4 weeks
14 May	Dana	"Fairytale"	4 weeks
21 May	Dana	"Fairytale"	4 weeks
28 May	Yvonne Elliman	"Love Me"	1 week
4 June	Julie Covington	"Don't Cry for Me Argentina"	5 weeks
11 June	Julie Covington	"Don't Cry for Me Argentina"	5 weeks
18 June	Julie Covington	"Don't Cry for Me Argentina"	5 weeks
25 June	Julie Covington	"Don't Cry for Me Argentina"	5 weeks
2 July	Julie Covington	"Don't Cry for Me Argentina"	5 weeks
9 July	Leo Sayer	"When I Need You"	11 weeks
16 July	Leo Sayer	"When I Need You"	11 weeks
23 July	Leo Sayer	"When I Need You"	11 weeks
30 July	Leo Sayer	"When I Need You"	11 weeks
6 August	Leo Sayer	"When I Need You"	11 weeks
13 August	Leo Sayer	"When I Need You"	11 weeks
20 August	Leo Sayer	"When I Need You"	11 weeks
27 August	Leo Sayer	"When I Need You"	11 weeks
3 September	Leo Sayer	"When I Need You"	11 weeks
10 September	Leo Sayer	"When I Need You"	11 weeks
17 September	Leo Sayer	"When I Need You"	11 weeks
24 September	Boney M.	"Ma Baker"	4 weeks
1 October	Boney M.	"Ma Baker"	4 weeks
8 October	Boney M.	"Ma Baker"	4 weeks
15 October	Boney M.	"Ma Baker"	4 weeks
22 October	Kenny Rogers	"Lucille"	5 weeks
29 October	Kenny Rogers	"Lucille"	5 weeks
5 November	Kenny Rogers	"Lucille"	5 weeks
12 November	Kenny Rogers	"Lucille"	5 weeks
19 November	Kenny Rogers	"Lucille"	5 weeks
26 November	Peter McCann	"Do You Wanna Make Love"	1 week
3 December	Space	"Magic Fly"	6 weeks
10 December	Space	"Magic Fly"	6 weeks
17 December	Space	"Magic Fly"	6 weeks
24 December	Space	"Magic Fly"	6 weeks
31 December	No chart		

== 1978 ==
Date	Artist	Single	Weeks at #1
7 January	Space	"Magic Fly"	6 weeks
14 January	Space	"Magic Fly"	6 weeks
21 January	Brotherhood of Man	"Angelo"	10 weeks
28 January	Brotherhood of Man	"Angelo"	10 weeks
4 February	Brotherhood of Man	"Angelo"	10 weeks
11 February	Brotherhood of Man	"Angelo"	10 weeks
18 February	Brotherhood of Man	"Angelo"	10 weeks
25 February	Brotherhood of Man	"Angelo"	10 weeks
4 March	Brotherhood of Man	"Angelo"	10 weeks
11 March	Brotherhood of Man	"Angelo"	10 weeks
18 March	Brotherhood of Man	"Angelo"	10 weeks
25 March	Brotherhood of Man	"Angelo"	10 weeks
1 April	The Dreamers (Note: Because of sanctions imposed by EMI, records by their artists were not sold in Rhodesia/Zimbabwe until 1981, so the song, originally by Wings, was recorded for release in Rhodesia by a cover band.)	"Mull of Kintyre"	1 week
8 April	Rita Coolidge	"(Your Love Keeps Lifting Me) Higher and Higher"	5 weeks
15 April	Rita Coolidge	"(Your Love Keeps Lifting Me) Higher and Higher"	5 weeks
22 April	Rita Coolidge	"(Your Love Keeps Lifting Me) Higher and Higher"	5 weeks
29 April	Rita Coolidge	"(Your Love Keeps Lifting Me) Higher and Higher"	5 weeks
6 May	Rita Coolidge	"(Your Love Keeps Lifting Me) Higher and Higher"	5 weeks
13 May	Clout	"Substitute"	2 weeks
20 May	Clout	"Substitute"	2 weeks
27 May	Bee Gees	"Stayin' Alive" / "Night Fever" (Note: A rare edition with two hit songs on the same 45; released only in Rhodesia and East Germany.)	5 weeks
3 June	Bee Gees	"Stayin' Alive" / "Night Fever"	5 weeks
10 June	Bee Gees	"Stayin' Alive" / "Night Fever"	5 weeks
17 June	Bee Gees	"Stayin' Alive" / "Night Fever"	5 weeks
24 June	Bee Gees	"Stayin' Alive" / "Night Fever"	5 weeks
1 July	Boney M.	"Rivers of Babylon"	10 weeks
8 July	Boney M.	"Rivers of Babylon"	10 weeks
15 July	Boney M.	"Rivers of Babylon"	10 weeks
22 July	Boney M.	"Rivers of Babylon"	10 weeks
29 July	Boney M.	"Rivers of Babylon"	10 weeks
5 August	Boney M.	"Rivers of Babylon"	10 weeks
12 August	Boney M.	"Rivers of Babylon"	10 weeks
19 August	Boney M.	"Rivers of Babylon"	10 weeks
26 August	Boney M.	"Rivers of Babylon"	10 weeks
2 September	Boney M.	"Rivers of Babylon"	10 weeks
9 September	John Travolta & Olivia Newton-John	"You're the One That I Want"	14 weeks
16 September	John Travolta & Olivia Newton-John	"You're the One That I Want"	14 weeks
23 September	John Travolta & Olivia Newton-John	"You're the One That I Want"	14 weeks
30 September	John Travolta & Olivia Newton-John	"You're the One That I Want"	14 weeks
7 October	John Travolta & Olivia Newton-John	"You're the One That I Want"	14 weeks
14 October	John Travolta & Olivia Newton-John	"You're the One That I Want"	14 weeks
21 October	John Travolta & Olivia Newton-John	"You're the One That I Want"	14 weeks
28 October	John Travolta & Olivia Newton-John	"You're the One That I Want"	14 weeks
4 November	John Travolta & Olivia Newton-John	"You're the One That I Want"	14 weeks
11 November	John Travolta & Olivia Newton-John	"You're the One That I Want"	14 weeks
18 November	John Travolta & Olivia Newton-John	"You're the One That I Want"	14 weeks
25 November	John Travolta & Olivia Newton-John	"You're the One That I Want"	14 weeks
2 December	John Travolta & Olivia Newton-John	"You're the One That I Want"	14 weeks
9 December	John Travolta & Olivia Newton-John	"You're the One That I Want"	14 weeks
16 December	Spectrum (Note: Because of sanctions imposed by EMI, records by their artists were not sold in Rhodesia/Zimbabwe until 1981, so the song, originally by Marshall Hain, was recorded for release in Rhodesia by a cover band.)	"Dancing In The City"	2 weeks
23 December	Spectrum	"Dancing In The City"	2 weeks
30 December	No chart		

== 1979 ==
Rhodesia was succeeded by Zimbabwe Rhodesia on 1 June 1979, which existed until 12 December 1979, when it changed to temporary British colonial rule as Southern Rhodesia. The modern Republic of Zimbabwe gained independence on 18 April 1980.

Date	Artist	Single	Weeks at #1
6 January	Dave Loggins	"Three Little Words (I Love You)"	3 weeks
13 January	Dave Loggins	"Three Little Words (I Love You)"	3 weeks
20 January	Dave Loggins	"Three Little Words (I Love You)"	3 weeks
27 January	Leo Sayer	"I Can't Stop Loving You (Though I Try)"	4 weeks
3 February	Leo Sayer	"I Can't Stop Loving You (Though I Try)"	4 weeks
10 February	Leo Sayer	"I Can't Stop Loving You (Though I Try)"	4 weeks
17 February	Leo Sayer	"I Can't Stop Loving You (Though I Try)"	4 weeks
24 February	Billy Joel	"My Life"	2 weeks
3 March	Billy Joel	"My Life"	2 weeks
10 March	Bee Gees	"Too Much Heaven"	3 weeks
17 March	Bee Gees	"Too Much Heaven"	3 weeks
24 March	Bee Gees	"Too Much Heaven"	3 weeks
31 March	Chic	"Le Freak"	6 weeks
7 April	Chic	"Le Freak"	6 weeks
14 April	Chic	"Le Freak"	6 weeks
21 April	Chic	"Le Freak"	6 weeks
28 April	Chic	"Le Freak"	6 weeks
5 May	Chic	"Le Freak"	6 weeks
12 May	ABBA	"Chiquitita"	4 weeks
19 May	ABBA	"Chiquitita"	4 weeks
26 May	ABBA	"Chiquitita"	4 weeks
2 June	ABBA	"Chiquitita"	4 weeks
9 June	Blondie	"Heart of Glass"	1 week
16 June	Clout	"Save Me"	2 weeks
23 June	Clout	"Save Me"	2 weeks
30 June	Dire Straits	"Sultans of Swing"	4 weeks
7 July	Dire Straits	"Sultans of Swing"	4 weeks
14 July	Dire Straits	"Sultans of Swing"	4 weeks
21 July	Dire Straits	"Sultans of Swing"	4 weeks
28 July	Julie Covington	"I Want to See the Bright Lights Tonight"	4 weeks
4 August	Julie Covington	"I Want to See the Bright Lights Tonight"	4 weeks
11 August	Julie Covington	"I Want to See the Bright Lights Tonight"	4 weeks
18 August	Julie Covington	"I Want to See the Bright Lights Tonight"	4 weeks
25 August	Santana	"Well All Right"	6 weeks
1 September	Santana	"Well All Right"	6 weeks
8 September	Santana	"Well All Right"	6 weeks
15 September	Santana	"Well All Right"	6 weeks
22 September	Santana	"Well All Right"	6 weeks
29 September	Santana	"Well All Right"	6 weeks
6 October	The Raiders (Note: Because of sanctions imposed by EMI, records by their artists were not sold in Rhodesia/Zimbabwe until 1981, so the song, originally by Racey, was recorded for release in Rhodesia by a cover band. After its 11th chart week, its release was discovered in the UK and it was withdrawn from the Rhodesian market.)	"Some Girls"	5 weeks
13 October	The Raiders	"Some Girls"	5 weeks
20 October	The Raiders	"Some Girls"	5 weeks
27 October	The Raiders	"Some Girls"	5 weeks
3 November	The Raiders	"Some Girls"	5 weeks
10 November	The Boomtown Rats	"I Don't Like Mondays"	5 weeks
17 November	The Boomtown Rats	"I Don't Like Mondays"	5 weeks
24 November	The Boomtown Rats	"I Don't Like Mondays"	5 weeks
1 December	The Boomtown Rats	"I Don't Like Mondays"	5 weeks
8 December	The Boomtown Rats	"I Don't Like Mondays"	5 weeks
15 December	Joe Jackson	"Is She Really Going Out with Him?"	3 weeks
22 December	Joe Jackson	"Is She Really Going Out with Him?"	3 weeks
29 December	Joe Jackson	"Is She Really Going Out with Him?"	3 weeks

== See also ==
- Music of Zimbabwe

== Notes and references ==
Footnotes
