= 1985 Country Music Association Awards =

Music awards ceremony in Nashville, US

- Date: October 14, 1985
- Location: Grand Ole Opry House, Nashville, Tennessee
- Hosted by: Kris Kristofferson; Anne Murray
- Most wins: George Strait; The Judds (2 each)
- Most nominations: Ricky Skaggs (5)

Television/radio coverage
- Network: CBS

The 1985 Country Music Association Awards, 19th Ceremony, was held on October 14, 1985, at the Grand Ole Opry House, Nashville, Tennessee, and was hosted by CMA Award winners Kris Kristofferson and Anne Murray.

== Winners and nominees ==
Winner are in Bold.

Entertainer of the Year	Album of the Year
**Ricky Skaggs**; Alabama; Lee Greenwood; Reba McEntire; George Strait	**Does Fort Worth Ever Cross Your Mind — George Strait**; 40 Hour Week — Alabama; Country Boy — Ricky Skaggs; My Kind of Country — Reba McEntire; Why Not Me — The Judds
Male Vocalist of the Year	Female Vocalist of the Year
**George Strait**; Lee Greenwood; Gary Morris; Ricky Skaggs; Hank Williams, Jr.	**Reba McEntire**; Rosanne Cash; Janie Fricke; Emmylou Harris; Anne Murray
Vocal Group of the Year	Vocal Duo of the Year
**The Judds**; Alabama; Exile; Oak Ridge Boys; The Whites	**Anne Murray and Dave Loggins**; Barbara Mandrell and Lee Greenwood; Dolly Parton and Kenny Rogers; Moe Bandy and Joe Stampley; Willie Nelson and Ray Charles
Single of the Year	Song of the Year
**"Why Not Me" — The Judds**; "Baby's Got Her Blue Jeans On" — Mel McDaniel; "Country Boy" — Ricky Skaggs; "Does Fort Worth Ever Cross Your Mind" — George Strait; "Highwayman" — The Highwaymen	**"God Bless The USA" — Lee Greenwood**; "Baby's Got Her Blue Jeans On" — Bob McDill; "Does Fort Worth Ever Cross Your Mind" — Darlene Shafer and Sanger D. Shafer; "Mama He's Crazy" — Kenny O'Dell; "Seven Spanish Angels" — Eddie Setser and Troy Seals
Horizon Award	Instrumentalist of the Year
**Sawyer Brown**; Ray Charles; Mel McDaniel; Eddy Raven; John Schneider	**Chet Atkins**; Floyd Cramer; Johnny Gimble; Hargus "Pig" Robbins; Buddy Spicher
Instrumental Group of the Year	Music Video of the Year
**Ricky Skaggs Band**; Alabama; Exile; Nitty Gritty Dirt Band; The Whites	**All My Rowdy Friends Are Comin' Over Tonight — Hank Williams, Jr.**; America — Waylon Jennings; Country Boy — Ricky Skaggs; Highwayman — The Highwaymen; Second Hand Heart — Gary Morris

== Hall of Fame ==
Country Music Hall of Fame Inductees
- Flatt and Scruggs
