= Gentle to Your Senses =

Single by Mel McDaniel

from the album Gentle to Your Senses
- B-side: "Honky Tonk Lady"
- Released: 1977
- Length: 2:35
- Composer: Larry E. Williams
- Producer: Johnny MacRae

US singles chronology
"All the Sweet" (1976)	"Gentle to Your Senses" (1977)	"Soul of a Honky Tonk Woman" (1977)

"Gentle to Your Senses" is a 1977 single by country singer Mel McDaniel. It was a hit for him that year, making the top twenty on both the Billboard and Cash Box charts.

== Background ==
The song was written by Lawrence Williams who had previously had success with his composition, "Let Your Love Flow" which was a hit for the Bellamy Brothers. It was recorded by Mel McDaniel. Backed with "Honky Tonk Lady", it was released on Capitol 4430 in 1977. Johnny MacRae was the producer for both sides. The song was also the title for Daniel's album.

"Gentle to Your Senses" was followed up with "Soul of a Honky Tonk Woman"

The song was also recorded by Frankie McBride and included on his album of the same name.

== Reception ==
The song was one of the nominated best cuts on Mel McDaniel's Gentle on Your Senses album.

== Airplay ==
The song was playlisted at CKNX in Wingham, Ontario, Canada.

== Charts ==
For the week of 30 July 1977, the single peaked at No. 18 on the Billboard Hot Country Singles chart, holding at that position for an additional week. It peaked at No. 15 on the Cash Box Top 100 Country chart for the week of 27 August. At week ten, it peaked at No. 18 on the Record World Country Singles Chart for the week of 13 August 1977.
