= Run C&W =

US musical group

- Origin: Nashville, Tennessee, USA
- Genre: Bluegrass
- Years active: 1992–1995
- Label: MCA
- Past members: Bernie Leadon; Vince Melamed; Jim Photoglo; Russell Smith

Run C&W was an American novelty bluegrass group that was active in the early 1990s, playing mostly cover renditions of classic soul and R&B songs in a bluegrass or roots country style, including banjo, harmonica, washboard, and multi-part vocal harmonies. They also played a handful of original parody songs. The band's name is a mix of the abbreviation for the "country & western" music genre (C&W), and Run DMC, a popular hip-hop group of the time.

The band was composed of veteran musicians including lead vocalist Russell Smith, formerly of the Amazing Rhythm Aces; banjoist Bernie Leadon, formerly of the Eagles and the Nitty Gritty Dirt Band; along with Nashville songwriters Jim Photoglo and Vince Melamed, both of whom played various instruments. In performance and in the album artwork and liner notes, the members portrayed fictitious non-identical quadruplets The Burns Brothers, each with pun names: Crash'n Burns, G.W. "Wash" Burns, Side Burns, and Rug Burns. Their father was known as "Dad Burns" and their mother as Augusta "Au" Burns.

Run C&W recorded two albums, both on MCA Records: 1993's Into the Twangy-First Century, followed by 1994's Row vs. Wade, and filmed at least one music video.

== Discography ==
=== Albums ===
| Title | Details |
|---|---|
| Into the Twangy-First Century | Release date: January 19, 1993; Label: MCA Records |
| Row vs. Wade | Release date: July 19, 1994; Label: MCA Records |

=== Singles ===
| Year | Single | Album |
|---|---|---|
| 1992 | "Itchy Twitchy Spot" (Parody of "Achy Breaky Heart") | Into the Twangy-First Century |
| 1993 | "Hold On, I'm Comin'" | Into the Twangy-First Century |

=== Music videos ===
| Year | Video |
|---|---|
| 1993 | "Hold On, I'm Comin'" |
