= Stacked Deck =

Studio album by Amazing Rhythm Aces
- Released: 1975
- Studio: Phillips Recording, Memphis, Tennessee
- Genre: Country rock
- Length: 40:35
- Label: ABC
- Producer: Barry "Byrd" Burton

Amazing Rhythm Aces chronology
Stacked Deck (1975)	Too Stuffed to Jump (1976)

Professional ratings
Review scores
Source	Rating
AllMusic	5/5 stars
Christgau's Record Guide	A−

Stacked Deck is the debut album by American country rock group the Amazing Rhythm Aces, released in 1975 on the ABC label. The album was recorded at the Phillips Recording Studio in Memphis, Tennessee, and was produced by group member Barry "Byrd" Burton. Most of the material was composed by the group's lead singer Russell Smith.

Stacked Deck reached No. 11 on the US country chart and #120 on the Billboard albums chart. It includes the group's biggest hit single, "Third Rate Romance", which peaked at No. 11 country and No. 14 pop, and did even better in Canada where it topped both the country and pop chart. "Amazing Grace (Used to Be Her Favorite Song)" was also released as a single and made No. 9 on the country chart, although it stalled at No. 72 on the pop chart.

== Track listing ==
All tracks written by Russell Smith unless stated

1. "Third Rate Romance" 3:17
2. "The 'Ella B'" 4:33
3. "Life's Railway to Heaven" (traditional, arranged by Barry Burton) 4:20
4. "The Beautiful Lie" (Butch McDade) 2:54
5. "Hit the Nail on the Head" 2:22
6. "Who Will the Next Fool Be" (Charlie Rich) 2:48
7. "Amazing Grace (Used to Be Her Favorite Song)" 3:17
8. "Anything You Want" (Russell Smith, James H. Brown Jr.) 3:48
9. "My Tears Still Flow" 3:25
10. "Emma-Jean" 2:47
11. "Why Can't I Be Satisfied" 3:03
12. "King of the Cowboys" (Russell Smith, James H. Brown Jr.) 4:01
13. “Mystery Train” (Junior Parker) 02:51

== Personnel ==
The Amazing Rhythm Aces

- Russell Smith — lead and backing vocals, rhythm guitar, harmonica
- Barry "Byrd" Burton — lead guitar, backing vocals, steel guitar, Dobro, mandolin; lead vocals on "Life's Railway to Heaven"
- James Hooker — piano, backing vocals
- Billy Earheart — organ, piano
- Jeff "Stick" Davis — bass, backing vocals
- Butch McDade — drums, backing vocals, percussion

Additional personnel

- Jim Kershaw — lead guitar on "Emma-Jean"

Production

- Recorded at Sam Phillips Recording Studio, Memphis, TN
- Produced and Engineered by Barry "Byrd" Burton
- Album photography, Jim McCrary
- Album design, Martin McDonald
