= God Made Love =

Single by Mel McDaniel

from the album Gentle to Your Senses
- Released: December 5, 1977
- Recorded: June 29, 1977
- Genre: Country
- Length: 3:15
- Label: Capitol Nashville
- Songwriters: Dennis Linde, Mel McDaniel, Johnny MacRae, Len Pollard
- Producer: Johnny MacRae

Mel McDaniel singles chronology
"Soul of a Honky Tonk Woman" (1977)	"God Made Love" (1977)	"The Farm" (1978)

"God Made Love" is a song co-written and recorded by American country music artist, Mel McDaniel. Recorded in June 1977 it was released in December of the year as the third and final single from McDaniel's album, Gentle to Your Senses. It peaked at number 11 on the U.S. Billboard Hot Country Singles & Tracks chart and number 12 on the Canadian RPM Country Tracks chart. It was written by Dennis Linde, Mel McDaniel, Johnny MacRae, and Len Pollard.

== Chart performance ==
Chart (1977–1978)	Peak position
U.S. Billboard Hot Country Singles & Tracks	11
Canadian RPM Country Tracks	12
