= Toucan Do It Too =

Studio album by Amazing Rhythm Aces
- Released: 1977
- Studio: Sam Phillips, Memphis, Tennessee
- Genre: Country rock, Southern rock
- Label: ABC
- Producer: Barry "Byrd" Burton

Amazing Rhythm Aces chronology
Too Stuffed to Jump (1976)	Toucan Do It Too (1977)	Burning the Ballroom Down (1978)

Professional ratings
Review scores
Source	Rating
AllMusic	4/5 stars

Toucan Do It Too is the third album by American country rock group the Amazing Rhythm Aces, released in 1977 on ABC Records. It reached No. 24 on the US country chart and No. 114 on the Billboard albums chart.

In 2000, Toucan Do It Too was reissued by the Special Products Division of Sony Music in the USA on a two-for-one CD that also contains the group's fourth album, Burning the Ballroom Down.

== Track listing ==
1. "Never Been to the Islands (Howard and Hugh's Blues)" (Russell Smith, Butch McDade, James H. Brown Jr.)
2. "Never Been Hurt" (Russell Smith, James H. Brown Jr.)
3. "Living in a World Unknown" (Russell Smith, James H. Brown Jr., Jeff Davis)
4. "Everybody's Talked Too Much" (Russell Smith, James H. Brown Jr.)
5. "Last Letter Home" (Butch McDade, James H. Brown Jr.)
6. "Who's Crying Now" (Russell Smith)
7. "Just Between You and Me and the Wall, You're a Fool" (James H. Brown Jr.)
8. "I'm Setting You Free" (J. T. Watts, Harold Allen, Jimmy Grimes)
9. "Geneva's Lullaby" (Russell Smith)
10. "Two Can Do It Too" (Russell Smith)
