= Big Ole Brew =

Single by Mel McDaniel

from the album Take Me to the Country
- Released: June 28, 1982
- Recorded: December 23, 1981
- Genre: Country
- Length: 2:47
- Label: Capitol Nashville
- Songwriter(s): Russell Smith
- Producer(s): Larry Rogers

Mel McDaniel singles chronology
"Take Me to the Country" (1982)	"Big Ole Brew" (1982)	"I Wish I Was in Nashville" (1982)

"Big Ole Brew" is a song written by Russell Smith, and recorded by American country music artist, Mel McDaniel. It was released in June 1982 as the third single from his album Take Me to the Country. It peaked at both number 4 on the U.S. Billboard Hot Country Singles & Tracks chart and on the Canadian RPM Country Tracks chart. It was originally recorded by the American country rock band Amazing Rhythm Aces, whose version appeared on their 1980 album, How the Hell Do You Spell Rythum?.

== Content ==
The song is a mid-tempo in which the narrator states that all he wants is a beer and his significant other.

== Charts ==
=== Weekly charts ===
Chart (1982)	Peak position
US Hot Country Songs (Billboard)	4
Canadian RPM Country Tracks	4

=== Year-end charts ===
Chart (1982)	Position
US Hot Country Songs (Billboard)	39

== Popular culture ==
In the beginning of the film Stripes, Bill Murray's character sings the line, "One of these days everything that I want's gonna be mine, But if it ain't that'll be alright as long as there's sunshine and a big ole brew" before his car is repossessed.

Since Stripes was released in 1981, he must have been quoting the original Amazing Rhythm Aces version from 1980.
