= The Joan Baez Country Music Album =

Compilation album by Joan Baez
- Released: 1979
- Genre: Country
- Label: Vanguard
- Producer: Maynard Solomon, Norbert Putnam; Jack Lothrop (Associate Producer)

Joan Baez chronology
Best of Joan C. Baez (1977)	The Joan Baez Country Music Album (1979)	Honest Lullaby (1979)

The Joan Baez Country Music Album is a 1979 compilation album by Joan Baez.

== Track listing ==
1. "The Night They Drove Old Dixie Down" (J. R. Robertson)
2. "Brand New Tennessee Waltz" (J. Winchester)
3. "Outside The Nashville City Limits" (J. Baez)
4. "Ghetto" (H. Banks, B. Bramlett, B. Crutcher)
5. "My Home's Across The Blue Ridge Mountains" (T. Ashley)
6. "Rock Salt and Nails" (B. Phillips)
7. "Help Me Make It Through the Night" (K. Kristofferson)
8. "Long Black Veil" (D. Dill, M. Wilkin)
9. "I Still Miss Someone" (J. Cash, R. Cash Jr.)
10. "San Francisco Mabel Joy" (M. Newbury)
11. "Take Me Back to the Sweet Sunny South" (traditional)
12. "Hickory Wind" (B. Bucannan, G. Parsons)
13. "Will the Circle Be Unbroken" (traditional)
14. "The Tramp on the Street" (G. Cole, H. Cole, J. Baez, M. Solomon)
15. "Carry It On" (G. Turner)
16. "Gospel Ship" (H. Buffam)
17. "Little Moses" (traditional)
18. "Banks of the Ohio" (traditional)
19. "Engine 143" (traditional)
20. "Pal of Mine" (traditional)
