= Best of Joan C. Baez =

The Best of Joan C. Baez

Greatest hits album by Joan Baez
- Released: November 1977
- Recorded: 1972–1976
- Genre: Folk
- Label: A&M
- Compiler: David Kershenbaum

Joan Baez chronology
Blowin' Away (1977)	The Best of Joan C. Baez (1977)	The Joan Baez Country Music Album (1979)

Professional ratings
Review scores
Source	Rating
AllMusic	4.5/5 stars
Record Mirror	3/5 stars
Tom Hull	C+

The Best of Joan C. Baez is a Joan Baez compilation that A&M put together shortly after Baez left the label in 1977. Selections from five of her six A&M albums were included (no songs from 1973's Where Are You Now, My Son? appear), with the emphasis on material from 1975's Diamonds & Rust. The liner notes were written by John L. Wasserman of the San Francisco Chronicle.

== Track listing ==
All tracks composed by Joan Baez; except where indicated

1. "Diamonds & Rust"
2. "Forever Young" (Bob Dylan)
3. "Prison Trilogy (Billy Rose)"
4. "Simple Twist of Fate" (Bob Dylan)
5. "Never Dreamed You'd Leave in Summer" (Stevie Wonder, Syreeta Wright)
6. "Love Song to a Stranger"
7. "Please Come to Boston" (Dave Loggins)
8. "Children and All That Jazz"
9. "Sweeter for Me"
10. "Imagine" (John Lennon)
11. "Gracias a la Vida" (Violeta Parra)
12. "The Night They Drove Old Dixie Down" (Robbie Robertson)

== Charts ==
Chart (1977)	Peak position
Billboard Top LPs & Tape	121
Cashbox Top 100 Albums (200 positions)	169
