= Lawrence Williams (songwriter) =

- Also known as: Larry E. Williams
- Born: Lawrence Eugene Williams; United States
- Genres: Rock, country
- Instruments: Guitar, Piano
- Formerly of: The Second Helping

Lawrence Williams aka Larry E. Williams is an American songwriter, musician and former roadie. He found success with his composition "Let Your Love Flow" which was a hit for the Bellamy Brothers in 1976.

== Background ==
Williams was once a roadie for Neil Diamond. During the 1960s, he was a member of the group The Second Helping that also included Kenny Loggins in the lineup. Williams didn't start out to be a songwriter. He wrote other songs such as "Miss Oo Oo Oo", "City Sadness" and "When You Miss Your Love" etc., but his major successes were "Let Your Love Flow" and "Gentle on Your Senses, Easy on Your Mind".

== Career ==
While at school Williams started learning saxophone but gave it up in favor of guitar and he had assistance from friends in learning to play it. As a teenager he worked in music stores as well as played in club bands. One of the bands was The Second Helping which featured Kenny Loggins on rhythm guitar and vocals. The group recorded three singles for the Viva Records label.

Williams wrote "Let Your Love Flow" for Neil Diamond. However, Diamond didn't want to record the song. Johnny Rivers passed on the song as well. But song had actually been recorded by Gene Cotton but he didn't have the rights to it. Dennis St. John, the drummer for Diamond thought that it was a perfect song for The Bellamy Brothers and after some reluctance by their label Curb Records, they were allowed to record it. The song would get to No. 1 Billboard Hot 100 singles chart.

Williams wrote "Gentle to Your Senses" which was recorded by Mel McDaniel. It was a hit for him, peaking at No. 18 on the Billboard Country chart in 1977. It also peaked at No. 15 on the Cash Box Top 100 Country chart. The song was also the title for Daniel's album.

Williams was a production assistant on Neil Diamond's 1986 album, Headed for the Future. Williams wrote the song "When You Miss Your Love" which was recorded by Neil Diamond and included on his 1991 album Lovescape.
