= Let Your Love Flow =

- Side A of the US single

Single by The Bellamy Brothers

from the album Let Your Love Flow
- B-side: "Inside of My Guitar"
- Released: January 1976
- Recorded: October 1975
- Genre: Country, pop rock, soft rock
- Length: 3:18
- Label: Warner Bros./Curb
- Songwriter: Larry E. Williams
- Producers: Phil Gernhard; Tony Scotti

The Bellamy Brothers singles chronology
"Let Your Love Flow" (1976)	"Hell Cat" (1976)

"Let Your Love Flow" is the debut single by country music duo the Bellamy Brothers, recorded in late 1975 and released in January 1976. The song was written by Larry E. Williams and produced by Phil Gernhard and Tony Scotti. It became an international hit, reaching number one in several countries including the United States and Germany, while reaching the top ten in at least nine others including the United Kingdom and Australia.

== History ==
The Bellamy Brothers – siblings David and Howard Bellamy from Pasco County – had been working as session musicians at the Studio 70 recording studio in Tampa when a demo of a song written by David, "Spiders and Snakes", was optioned for Jim Stafford, whose 1973 recording became a million-selling hit single. On the recommendation of Stafford's producer Phil Gernhard, the Bellamy Brothers relocated to Los Angeles to pursue a recording career. The duo initially stayed with Stafford in the Hollywood house whose purchase Stafford's success with "Spiders and Snakes" had made possible, and for a time Howard acted as Stafford's road manager while Gernhard arranged for David to record as a solo act for the Warner Bros. Records affiliate Curb Records with a resultant regional hit, "Nothin' Heavy", number 77 on the Billboard Hot 100 in 1975.

While cutting demos with Neil Diamond's band (for which the song's writer Larry Williams was working as a roadie) David Bellamy recalls Diamond's drummer St John mentioning the song as appropriate for the Bellamys to record, but that St John sent the demo of the song to Phil Gernhard: David Bellamy (quote) - "the next day I went to Phil's office and listened to it. I [then] called Howard and said :'I’ve got to play you this song!'" David further states: "We went back in with Neil's band" – to the Wally Heider Recording Studio in Hollywood – "and cut the song. We got the right key, the band hooked it right away and we probably didn’t do more than two or three takes on the whole session. It was the perfect song for us and became the key to our career."

"Let Your Love Flow" reached #1 on the Billboard Hot 100 dated 1 May 1976, also crossing-over to the Billboard chart rankings for Hot Adult Contemporary Tracks with a peak of #2, and also for Hot Country Singles with a peak of 21. According to David Bellamy (quote): "There were a couple of guys from Holland who were in town when the single was released, and our record company gave it to them to take home and they also sent it to Germany", and "Let Your Love Flow" debuted at 22 on the Dutch Top 30 chart dated 6 March 1976, the same date as the track's Billboard Top 40 debut at #38: the track would eventually peak at 6 on both the Dutch chart and Belgium's Flemish chart. In June and July 1976 "Let Your Love Flow" spent five weeks at #1 in Germany and also in Switzerland, while the track would be ranked at #1 on the monthly Austrian hit parades dated the 15th of August, September and October. "Let Your Love Flow" was afforded further European success with a seven-week tenure at #2 in both Norway and Sweden, while the track achieved chart peaks of #7 in the UK and #3 in Ireland. "Let Your Love Flow" also reached #1 on the hit parade for South Africa, #2 in New Zealand and #6 in Australia.

== Revival and cover versions ==
In 2008 and 2009 "Let Your Love Flow" enjoyed a UK chart renaissance when it was featured in a television advert for Barclays promoting the bank's Barclaycard in its contactless format. Filmed in Rio de Janeiro and São Paulo, the ad's focus was on an office clerk – played by Robert Wilfort – who utilizes his Barclaycard while traveling home on a waterslide, a metaphor for the ease with which the card may be used. The ad was first aired 25 October 2008, and two weeks later "Let Your Love Flow" re-entered the UK Top 100 singles chart dated 8 November 2008 at #48, with the track eventually peaking at #21 over a six-week tenure with subsequent UK chart tenures of five weeks in February/ March 2009 (peak #48) and three weeks that summer (#76).

Speaking for the Bellamy Brothers, David Bellamy said: "We had no idea the song 'Let Your Love Flow' had been licensed to Barclay for an advertisement [until] after the single started climbing the charts in England. Any artist is always thrilled when one of your signature songs has longevity like this because it was thirty-two years ago when we first released the tune. We've always had such faithful fans in Europe, like we do in the United States, but with the single charting again we're introducing our music to a whole new generation of music lovers."

"Let Your Love Flow" has been covered by numerous other artists, including Joan Baez, who included it on her 1979 Honest Lullaby album. Another re-recording by the Bellamy Brothers with Gölä is included on the album The Greatest Hits Sessions. "Ein Bett im Kornfeld", a German language adaptation of the song recorded by Jürgen Drews, spent six weeks at #1 in West Germany in 1976, immediately subsequent to the five-week #1 tenure of the Bellamy Brothers' original. In 2026, the song increased in popularity after it was featured in the Extended Look trailer for Grand Theft Auto VI.

== Charts ==
=== Weekly charts ===
Chart (1976)	Peak position
Australia (Kent Music Report)	6
Austria (Ö3 Austria Top 40)	1
Belgium (Ultratop 50 Flanders)	6
Belgium (Ultratop 50 Wallonia)	42
Canada Top Singles (RPM)	3
Canada Adult Contemporary (RPM)	1
Canada Country Singles (RPM)	42
Ireland (IRMA)	3
Netherlands (Dutch Top 40)	6
Netherlands (Single Top 100)	6
New Zealand (Recorded Music NZ)	2
Norway (VG-lista)	2
Rhodesia (Lyons Maid Hits of the Week)	1
South Africa (Springbok)	1
Sweden (Sverigetopplistan)	2
Switzerland (Schweizer Hitparade)	1
UK Singles (Official Charts)	7
US Billboard Hot 100	1
US Adult Contemporary (Billboard)	2
US Hot Country Songs (Billboard)	21
West Germany (GfK)	1

=== Year-end charts ===
Chart (1976)	Position
Australia (Kent Music Report)	48
Austria (Ö3 Austria Top 40)	6
Belgium (Ultratop Flanders)	55
Canada Top Singles (RPM)	53
Netherlands (Dutch Top 40)	52
Netherlands (Single Top 100)	52
New Zealand (Recorded Music NZ)	9
South Africa (Springbok)	9
Switzerland (Schweizer Hitparade)	4
UK Singles (OCC)	57
US Billboard Hot 100	36
US Adult Contemporary (Billboard)	34
West Germany (Official German Charts)	8

== Certifications ==
Region	Certification	Certified units/sales
New Zealand (RMNZ)	2× Platinum	60,000^{‡}
United Kingdom (BPI)	Platinum	600,000^{‡}
United States (RIAA)	Gold	500,000^{‡}
^{‡} Sales+streaming figures based on certification alone.
