= Let It Roll (Let It Rock) =

Single by Mel McDaniel

from the album Let It Roll
- B-side: "Dreamin' with You"
- Released: March 11, 1985
- Recorded: November 7, 1984
- Genre: Country
- Length: 2:06
- Label: Capitol Nashville
- Songwriter(s): Chuck Berry
- Producer(s): Jerry Kennedy

Mel McDaniel singles chronology
"Baby's Got Her Blue Jeans On" (1984)	"Let It Roll (Let It Rock)" (1985)	"Stand Up" (1985)

"Let It Roll (Let It Rock)" is a song written by Chuck Berry and recorded by American country music artist Mel McDaniel. It was released in March 1985 as the second and final single from McDaniel's album Let It Roll. It peaked at both number 6 on the U.S. Billboard Hot Country Singles & Tracks chart and on the Canadian RPM Country Tracks chart.

== Music video ==
The music video was directed by George Bloom and premiered in early 1985. It features the band playing on a flatcar in a train pulled by South Central Tennessee Railroad ALCO RS-11 #29.

== Chart performance ==
Chart (1985)	Peak position
U.S. Billboard Hot Country Singles	6
Canadian RPM Country Tracks	6
