= Take Me to the Country =

Single by Mel McDaniel

from the album Take Me to the Country
- Released: March 7, 1982
- Recorded: December 29, 1981
- Genre: Country
- Length: 2:31
- Label: Capitol Nashville
- Songwriter(s): Ronny Scaife, Don Singleton, Larry Rogers
- Producer(s): Larry Rogers

Mel McDaniel singles chronology
"Preaching Up a Storm" (1981)	"Take Me to the Country" (1982)	"Big Ole Brew" (1982)

"Take Me to the Country" is a song recorded by American country music artist, Mel McDaniel. It was released in March 1982 as the second single from McDaniel's album Take Me to the Country. It peaked at number 10 on the U.S. Billboard Hot Country Singles & Tracks chart and at number 22 on the Canadian RPM Country Tracks chart. It was written by Ronny Scaife, Don Singleton and Larry Rogers.

== Chart performance ==
Chart (1982)	Peak position
U.S. Billboard Hot Country Singles	10
Canadian RPM Country Tracks	22
