= Louisiana Saturday Night =

Single by Mel McDaniel

from the album I'm Countryfied
- B-side: "My Ship's Comin' In"
- Released: March 1981
- Recorded: May 1980
- Genre: Country, bluegrass, cajun
- Length: 2:23
- Label: Capitol Nashville
- Songwriter: Bob McDill
- Producer: Larry Rogers

Mel McDaniel singles chronology
"Countryfied" (1980)	"Louisiana Saturday Night" (1981)	"Right in the Palm of Your Hand" (1981)

"Louisiana Saturday Night" is a song written by Bob McDill and recorded by American country music artist Mel McDaniel. It was released in March 1981 as the third single from McDaniel's 1980 album, I'm Countryfied. The song was originally sung by Don Williams on his 1977 album Country Boy. The song is often mistakenly attributed to popular country music bands Alabama and the Nitty Gritty Dirt Band. Adding to the confusion, Tom T. Hall wrote an earlier, unrelated song by the same name. Hall's "Louisiana Saturday Night" was recorded by Mamou, Louisiana's Jimmy C. Newman in 1967.

== Use in radio ==
This selection is used as the theme song for The Outdoorsman Show on WWL 870 AM and 105.3 FM in New Orleans, which is hosted by radio personality Don Dubuc.

== Use in sports ==
“Louisiana Saturday Night” can be heard before every home Louisiana State University football and Louisiana Ragin' Cajuns football game, played in Tiger Stadium, in Baton Rouge, Louisiana, and Our Lady of Lourdes Stadium, in Lafayette, Louisiana, respectively. The song is adored by fans not only for its easy-to-dance-to beat and obvious namesake reference, but also because of a longstanding tradition that the Tigers and Cajuns fare better both at home, and on Saturday evenings. The Tigers' and Cajuns' regular-season home football games all take place on Saturdays, and preferably at night (though scheduling may be affected by television time slots and weather, such as hurricanes). A poem written for the stadium featured during the pregame activities officially references “Saturday Night in Death Valley”, with Death Valley being a nickname for the stadium. The song is usually followed directly by another popular country tune with a similar reference, “Callin' Baton Rouge” by Garth Brooks.

== Other references ==
This was the opening theme of the Music Machine, country-music oldies show, which aired on New York City's WHN on Saturday nights from 8:00 to 12:00 pm.

Slurred lyrics of the song were quoted by John Luke Robertson on the reality show Duck Dynasty as he was recovering from anesthesia after a dental procedure.

The song was used in the sixth and final season the television drama The Americans for a line dancing sequence involving the main character, Philip Jennings.

== Chart performance ==
Chart (1981)	Peak position
U.S. Billboard Hot Country Singles	7
Canadian RPM Country Tracks	21
