= Right in the Palm of Your Hand =

Single by Mel McDaniel

from the album I'm Countryfied
- Released: July 13, 1981
- Recorded: July 16, 1980
- Genre: Country
- Length: 3:12
- Label: Capitol Nashville
- Songwriter(s): Bob McDill
- Producer(s): Larry Rogers

Mel McDaniel singles chronology
"Louisiana Saturday Night" (1981)	"Right in the Palm of Your Hand" (1981)	"Preaching Up a Storm" (1981)

"Right in the Palm of Your Hand" is the title of a country song written by Bob McDill. The song was first recorded by Crystal Gayle on her 1976 album Crystal. The only charting version of the song was recorded by American country music artist Mel McDaniel. It was released in July 1981 as the fourth and final single from McDaniel's 1980 album, I'm Countryfied. It peaked at number 10 on the U.S. Billboard Hot Country Singles & Tracks chart and at number 17 on the Canadian RPM Country Tracks chart.

Another 1981 version of the song was a duet; Crystal Gayle's older sister, Loretta Lynn, and Conway Twitty on their Two's a Party album.

The best-known version today is Alan Jackson's, from his 1999 Under the Influence covers album.

== Chart performance ==
Chart (1981)	Peak position
U.S. Billboard Hot Country Singles	10
Canadian RPM Country Tracks	17
