= I'm Countryfied =

Studio album by Mel McDaniel
- Released: November 10, 1980
- Recorded: 1980
- Genre: Country
- Length: 30:24
- Label: Capitol
- Producer: Larry Rogers

Mel McDaniel chronology
Mello (1978)	I'm Countryfied (1980)	Take Me to the Country (1982)

I'm Countryfied is the third studio album by American country music artist Mel McDaniel, released on November 10, 1980 by Capitol Records. The album peaked at number 24 on the Top Country Albums charts. The biggest hit on the album, and also one of McDaniel's biggest hits, was "Louisiana Saturday Night", which reached number seven on the Hot Country Singles and Tracks charts. Also on the US Country charts, the title track, "Countryfied", peaked at number 23, "Hello Daddy Good Morning Darling" peaked at number 39, and "Right in the Palm of Your Hand" peaked at number 10.

== Track listing ==
1. "Louisiana Saturday Night" (Bob McDill) - 2:24
2. "If I Keep on Going Crazy" (Roger Murrah, Jim McBride) - 2:38
3. "Right in the Palm of Your Hand" (Bob McDill) - 3:12
4. "Who's Been Sleeping in My Bed" (Danny Hogan, Frank Newberry) - 3:12
5. "Cold Hard Facts of Love" (Mel McDaniel) - 3:05
6. "Countryfied" (Ronny Scaife, Danny Hogan) - 2:38
7. "Ten Years Three Kids Two Loves Too Late" (Roger Murrah, Jim McBride) - 3:10
8. "Goodbye Marie" (Dennis Linde, Mel McDaniel) - 2:56
9. "My Ship's Comin' In" (Danny Hogan, Henry Carter, Randy Wilkes) - 3:02
10. "Hello Daddy Good Morning Darling" (Roger Murrah, Keith Stegall, Scott Anders) - 3:27

== Charts ==
=== Weekly charts ===
Chart (1980–1981)	Peak position
US Top Country Albums (Billboard)	24

=== Year-end charts ===
Chart (1981)	Position
US Top Country Albums (Billboard)	24
