= Real Good Feel Good Song =

Single by Mel McDaniel

from the album Now You're Talkin'
- B-side: "Chain Smokin'"
- Released: April 1988
- Recorded: February 1987
- Genre: Country
- Length: 2:35
- Label: Capitol Nashville
- Songwriter(s): Richard Fagan, Larry Alderman
- Producer(s): Jerry Kennedy

Mel McDaniel singles chronology
"Ride This Train" (1988)	"Real Good Feel Good Song" (1988)	"Henrietta" (1988)

"Real Good Feel Good Song" is a song written by Richard Fagan and Larry Alderman, and recorded by American country music artist Mel McDaniel. It was released in April 1988 as the third single from McDaniel's album, Now You're Talkin. It peaked at number 9 on the U.S. Billboard Hot Country Singles & Tracks chart and number 4 on the Canadian RPM Country Tracks chart.

== Music video ==
The music video was directed by Kenneth Brown and premiered in mid-1988.

== Charts ==
=== Weekly charts ===
Chart (1988)	Peak position
US Hot Country Songs (Billboard)	9
Canadian RPM Country Tracks	4

=== Year-end charts ===
Chart (1988)	Position
US Hot Country Songs (Billboard)	87
