= The Bama Band =

American country music group

- Origin: USA
- Genres: Country
- Years active: 1982–present
- Labels: Oasis, Soundwaves, Compleat, Mercury Nashville, Capitol Nashville, Ginnin' Cotton
- Members: Wayne "Animal" Turner "Cowboy" Eddie Long; Jerry McKinney; Ray Barrickman; William Claude Marshall
- Past members: Paul Eugene "Dixie" Hatfield; Lamar Morris; Vernon Derrick; Robert "Bob" Williams; Billy Earheart

The Bama Band is an American country music group composed of Lamar Morris (vocals, guitar), Wayne "Animal" Turner (guitar), "Cowboy" Eddie Long (steel guitar), Jerry McKinney (saxophone), Vernon Derrick (fiddle), Ray Barrickman (bass), Billy Earheart (keyboards) and William Claude Marshall (drums). For more than twenty years, the Bama Band was the backing band for Hank Williams, Jr. The Bama Band was nominated twice for Band of the Year by the Academy of Country Music. They also found success on the Billboard Hot Country Singles chart in the 1980s with singles like "Dallas," "Tijuana Sunrise" and "What Used to Be Crazy." An eponymous album released on Compleat Records in 1985 charted on the Billboard Top Country Albums chart.

== Discography ==
=== Albums ===
Year	Album	US Country	Label
1985	The Bama Band	61	Compleat
1988	Solid Ground	—	Mercury
1990	Takin' Off the Edge	—	Capitol
2004	Beale St. Boogie	—	Ginnin' Cotton

=== Singles ===
Year	Single	Chart Positions		Album
Year	Single	US Country	CAN Country	Album
1982	"Dallas"	54	—	singles only
1983	"Tijuana Sunrise"	56	—	singles only
1985	"What Used to Be Crazy"	60	—	The Bama Band
1986	"I've Changed My Mind"	70	—	The Bama Band
1987	"Suddenly Single"	64	—	single only
1988	"Southern Accent"	71	—	Solid Ground
1988	"Real Old-Fashioned Broken Heart"	69	—	Solid Ground
1989	"When We Get Back to the Farm"	87	—	Solid Ground
1990	"She's Movin' In"	—	93	Takin' Off the Edge
1990	"My Reckless Heart"	—	—	Takin' Off the Edge

=== Guest singles ===
Year	Single	Artist	Album
1990	"All My Rowdy Friends Are Coming Over for Monday Night Football"	Hank Williams, Jr.	America (The Way I See It)

=== Music videos ===
Year	Video	Director
1988	"Real Old-Fashioned Broken Heart"	Mac Bennett/Jim May
1990	"My Reckless Heart"	
