= The Amazing Rhythm Aces =

American country rock band

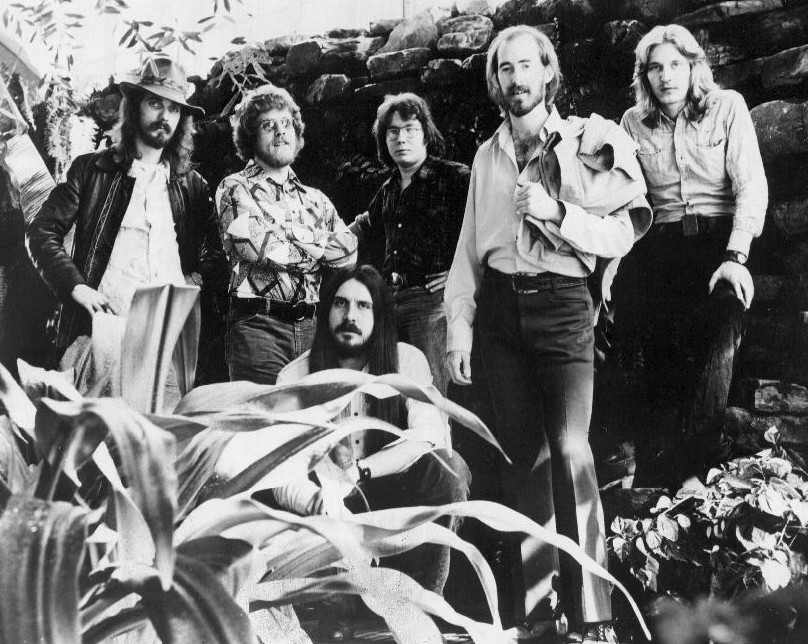
- The Amazing Rhythm Aces in 1976

Background information
- Origin: Memphis, Tennessee, United States
- Genres: Country rock; soft rock; southern rock
- Years active: 1974–1981, 1994–2019
- Labels: Valley, ABC, Columbia, Warner Bros., Breaker
- Past members: Billy Earheart III; Barry Burton; Duncan Cameron; Jeff Davis; James Hooker; Butch McDade; Danny Parks; Scott McClure; Mike Brooks; Russell Smith; Lorne Rall; Kelvin Holly; Mark Horn

The Amazing Rhythm Aces was an American country rock group, which characterized its music as "American music" or "roots music"—a blend of rock, country, blues, R&B, folk, reggae, and Latino. The band was best known for its 1975 hit "Third Rate Romance". They released 18 albums over 30 years (a period including a 15-year hiatus). The band's music was distinguished by its eclectic scope, literate and often quirky lyrics, and distinctive vocals by lead singer and songwriter Russell Smith.

== History ==
Members of the Aces played in Fatback, a local band in Knoxville, Tennessee, in the late 1960s and early 1970s, consisting of vocalist and guitarist Russell Smith, bassist Jeff "Stick" Davis, drummer Butch McDade (born David Hugh McDade in Clarksdale, Missouri on February 24, 1946), and Fatback's first lead guitarist Mike Brooks and later Dan Kennedy. The band left Knoxville in the early 1970s.

In 1972, the Aces came together in Memphis, Tennessee, at the recommendation of Barry "Byrd" Burton (born in Greene County, Tennessee on September 7, 1946), who was engineering and producing at the Sam Phillips Recording Studio in Memphis. Davis and McDade, who had recorded and toured with singer-songwriter Jesse Winchester as "The Rhythm Aces", recruited Smith, keyboardist Billy Earheart III, lead guitarist and multi-instrumentalist Burton, and pianist James Hooker to develop a sound mixing of pop, country, and blue-eyed soul.

Stacked Deck, their debut album, released in 1975, resulted in two crossover (rock and country) hits, "Third Rate Romance" and "Amazing Grace (Used to Be Her Favorite Song)". "Third Rate Romance" reached #14 on the US Billboard Hot 100, #11 on the US Hot Country Songs, and hit the #1 spot on the Canadian pop/rock charts. In 1976, "The End Is Not in Sight (The Cowboy Tune)", from the album Too Stuffed to Jump, won a Grammy for Country Vocal Performance by a Group. These tracks were engineered by Burton, who produced their first 3 albums.

Burton left the group after the release of Toucan Do It Too in 1977 and was replaced by Duncan Cameron.

In 1978, the Aces released Burning the Ballroom Down, followed the next year by a self-titled album featuring songs with Joan Baez, Tracy Nelson and the Muscle Shoals Horns. Both albums received critical approval but sold poorly in the midst of the Disco and Outlaw Country era. They released another album, How the Hell Do You Spell Rhythum, before disbanding.

== Reunion & Onward ==
The Aces re-formed in 1994. The group, composed of Smith, Davis, McDade, Earheart, Hooker, and new guitarist-mandolinist Danny Parks, released Ride Again, an album of new renditions of their biggest hits.

They composed songs for a comeback album, Out of the Blue, released in mid-1998 with drummer Michael Organ as a temporary replacement for the ailing McDade. Drummer Bill Bonnette played with the band in 1999. Davis left the group in 2004, shortly after the release of "Nothin' but the Blues" to join Sneaky Pete Kleinow and Garth Hudson in Burrito Deluxe. In 2007, the Aces' lineup included original members Smith and Earheart along with Kelvin Holly on lead guitar, who was also the guitarist for Little Richard from 1995 to 2015. The boogie-and-blues-inspired Nothin' but the Blues was followed by Midnight Communion, in 2007, which hearkened back to the Aces' eclectic roots music origins.

Russell Smith became a successful songwriter and had some minor successes on the country charts as a solo artist and successfully composed songs for other performers such as The Oak Ridge Boys, Tanya Tucker, Ricky Van Shelton, T. Graham Brown, and Randy Travis. Smith died from cancer on July 14, 2019 at age 70, at which point, the band came to an end.

Billy Earheart joined Hank Williams, Jr.'s Bama Band. He died aged 71 in Fulton, Mississippi on May 13, 2025 after an extended struggle with cancer.

Barry Burton became a successful producer and session guitarist. He released a solo instrumental country album, Byrd Braynz (ADF Records) in 2002. He died March 10, 2008 from complications of myelodysplastic syndrome, a rare form of blood cancer, at the age of 61.

Butch McDade died November 29, 1998 of bladder cancer at age 52 only months after the release of Out of the Blue.

Duncan Cameron joined Sawyer Brown, a group that found significant chart success in the 1980s.

James Hooker joined Nanci Griffith's band, the Blue Moon Orchestra, in 1987 and became its leader. Hooker retired from touring in 2007 and divides his time between Ireland and Spain, maintaining an active writing and recording career.

== Discography ==
=== Albums ===
| Year | Album | Chart positions | | | Label |
| Year | Album | US Country | US | AUS | Label |
|---|---|---|---|---|---|
| 1975 | Stacked Deck | 12 | 120 | — | ABC |
| 1976 | Too Stuffed to Jump | 16 | 157 | 93 | ABC |
| 1977 | Toucan Do It Too | 26 | 114 | — | ABC |
| 1978 | Burning the Ballroom Down | 28 | 166 | — | ABC |
| 1979 | The Amazing Rhythm Aces | 47 | 144 | — | ABC |
| 1980 | How the Hell Do You Spell Rythum? | — | 175 | 85 | Warner Bros. |
| 1981 | Full House: Aces High | — | — | — | MSS |
| 1982 | 4 You 4 Ever: Best of Amazing Rhythm Aces | — | — | — | M&R |
| 1994 | Ride Again | — | — | — | Breaker |
| 1997 | Out of the Blue | — | — | — | Breaker |
| 1998 | Chock Full of Country Goodness | — | — | — | Valley |
| 1999 | Live in Switzerland | — | — | — | Store for Music |
| 1999 | Concert Classics, Volume 3 | — | — | — | Renaissance |
| 2000 | Absolutely Live | — | — | — | Icehouse |
| 2000 | Stacked Deck/Too Stuffed To Jump | – | – | — | Collectors' Choice Music |
| 2001 | Between You and Us | — | — | — | Pilot |
| 2004 | Nothin' but the Blues | — | — | — | Russell Smith |
| 2007 | Midnight Communion | — | — | — | Russell Smith |
| 2009 | Very Best of Amazing Rhythm Aces | — | — | — | Varese |
| 2020 | Moments Live in Germany 2000 | — | — | — | MIG |

=== Singles ===
| Year | Single | Chart positions | | | | | Album |
| Year | Single | US Country | US | CAN Country | CAN | CAN AC | Album |
|---|---|---|---|---|---|---|---|
| 1975 | "Third Rate Romance" | 11 | 14 | 1 | 1 | 2 | Stacked Deck |
| 1975 | "Amazing Grace (Used to Be Her Favorite Song)" | 9 | 72 | 10 | 79 | — | Stacked Deck |
| 1976 | "The End Is Not in Sight (The Cowboy Tune)" | 12 | 42 | 20 | 69 | — | Too Stuffed to Jump |
| 1978 | "Ashes of Love" | 100 | — | — | — | — | Burning the Ballroom Down |
| 1979 | "Lipstick Traces (On a Cigarette)" | 88 | 104 | — | — | — | The Amazing Rhythm Aces |
| 1980 | "I Musta Died and Gone to Texas" | 77 | — | — | — | — | How the Hell Do You Spell Rythum? |

== Sources ==
- Biography by Jason Ankeny, Allmusic
- PBS listing
