= I Call It Love (Mel McDaniel song) =

Single by Mel McDaniel

from the album Mel McDaniel with Oklahoma Wind
- Released: October 14, 1983
- Recorded: December 15, 1982
- Genre: Country
- Length: 3:07
- Label: Capitol Nashville
- Songwriter: Bob McDill
- Producer: Larry Rogers

Mel McDaniel singles chronology
"Hot Time in Old Town Tonight" (1983)	"I Call It Love" (1983)	"Where'd That Woman Go" (1984)

"I Call It Love" is a song written by Bob McDill and recorded by American country music artist Mel McDaniel. It was released in December 1983 as the lead single from McDaniel's album Mel McDaniel with Oklahoma Wind. It peaked at number 9 on the U.S. Billboard Hot Country Singles & Tracks chart and number 29 on the Canadian RPM Country Tracks chart.

== Chart performance ==
Chart (1983–1984)	Peak position
U.S. Billboard Hot Country Singles	9
Canadian RPM Country Tracks	29
