= Stand Up (Mel McDaniel song) =

Single by Mel McDaniel

from the album Stand Up
- B-side: "I Feel a Storm Coming"
- Released: September 2, 1985
- Recorded: June 14, 1985
- Genre: Country
- Length: 2:33
- Label: Capitol Nashville
- Songwriter(s): Bruce Channel; Ricky Ray Rector; Sonny Throckmorton
- Producer(s): Jerry Kennedy

Mel McDaniel singles chronology
"Let It Roll (Let It Rock)" (1985)	"Stand Up" (1985)	"Shoe String" (1986)

"Stand Up" is a song recorded by American country music artist Mel McDaniel. It was released in September 1985 as the lead single and title track from McDaniel's album Stand Up. It peaked at number 5 on the U.S. Billboard Hot Country Singles & Tracks chart and at number 3 on the Canadian RPM Country Tracks chart. It was written by Bruce Channel, Ricky Ray Rector, and Sonny Throckmorton.

It was covered by The Band on their 1996 album High on the Hog and Cody Canada & the Departed as a bonus track on their 2011 album This Is Indian Land.

== Music video ==
The music video was directed by George Bloom and premiered in mid-1985. The video features actor Gailard Sartain portraying a defendant in a divorce court scenario of which he calls upon McDaniel as a key eyewitness testimony in an attempt to be exonerated from his case.

== Chart performance ==
Chart (1985)	Peak position
U.S. Billboard Hot Country Singles	5
Canadian RPM Country Tracks	3
