= Billy Earheart =

American musician (1954–2025)

Billy Earheart III
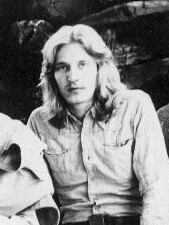
- Earheart in 1976

Background information
- Born: William Thaxton Earheart III; February 21, 1954; Tullahoma, Tennessee, U.S.
- Died: May 13, 2025 (aged 71) Fulton, Mississippi, U.S.
- Genres: Country
- Occupation: Musician
- Instruments: Keyboards, synthesizer
- Formerly of: Amazing Rhythm Aces

William Thaxton Earheart III (February 21, 1954 – May 13, 2025) was an American organist and piano player and original member of the Amazing Rhythm Aces. He and the Amazing Rhythm Aces won the Grammy Award for Best Country Vocal Performance By A Duo Or Group in the 19th Annual Grammy Awards for "The End Is Not In Sight (The Cowboy Tune)".

Earheart played piano for Hank Williams Jr.'s Bama Band for more than twenty years. He also played with artists including Al Green, Eddie Hinton, Memphis Slim, Waylon Jennings, BB King, and others. He played on over 200 albums.

Earheart died from cancer on May 13, 2025, at the age of 71.
