= Maria (South African singer) =

South African singer (1945-1980)

- Born: Carmélia Maria Neto Lopes; March 4, 1945; Lourenço Marques
- Died: May 10, 1980 (aged 35) Johannesburg, South Africa
- Instrument: vocal

Carmélia Maria Neto Lopes Maria (March 4, 1945 − May 10, 1980), more commonly known as Maria, was a South African musician.

Maria was born in Lourenço Marques (now known as Maputo) in Mozambique, then a prosperous Portuguese colony in South-Eastern Africa, on March 4, 1945. Her mother, who was of Portuguese origin, was a performer at RCM, Radio Clube de Moçambique. At the age of two, her family moved to Johannesburg, South Africa .

Maria began to show interest in music and led private and school parties. In 1964, she started performing professionally in night clubs in Johannesburg, which, at the time, was known as the New York of Africa.

She rose to fame after then guitarist Archie Van Der Ploeg suggested her to Stevie van Kerken, lead singer of "The New Trends", for a role in the chorus of a Dickie Loader song, "Help me Forget".

Columbia immediately invited her to make a record, leading to the creation of This is Maria, her first album, released in 1968. It contains songs like the country classic "Right or Wrong", "You" and "Gipsy Dreams".

Her second LP came out in late 1968 and is called Goodbye, Jimmy, Goodbye.

Maria became a musical sensation of South Africa in the late 1960s, and performed at several nightclubs in Hillbrow, such as the Lourenço Marques Restaurant and the Archie Club. She also became an attraction at the Top of Carlton, one of the most famous and trendy five-star hotels in the world, where international celebrities such as Henry Kissinger and famous artists such as Mick Jagger and Michael Jackson stayed. She made tournaments and shows sponsored by South African Airways.

In 1973, she released the single "I'm on Fire" and her voice was heard internationally, including in the United Kingdom, Germany and Sweden. In Brazil, the song was part of the LP Premier Mundial 2001 (1), one of the most sold in the country in the year 1973. The single "Clap Your Hands and Stamp Your Feet", a cover of the Peter Koelewijn-written song first recorded by Bonnie St. Claire, reached first place of the Hit-Parade by Springbok Radio in August 1973, and remained in the top 20 for 17 weeks. In 1974 Maria won a SARIE award as the best artist of the year. In 1974, she released "Hurry On Home" and in 1976 "Stand Up Like A Man". Maria's other albums are New Country Sounds, produced by Archie Van Der Ploeg, and Portrait Of Maria, a compilation album featuring her popular singles as well as new songs recorded by her in the 70s.

== Personal life ==
It is known that she had two daughters and currently has two granddaughters. Maria died prematurely after battling breast cancer at the age of 35 on May 10, 1980, in Johannesburg. She was cremated and her ashes were scattered through the Wilds (Municipal Natural Reserve of Wilds) where, according to family members, she would frequently meditate after musical performances.

== Awards ==
She reached No 1 on the Springbok Top 20 chart in 1973 with a cover of Bonnie St. Claire's Clap Your Hands And Stamp Your Feet. She won a SARIE award for Top 20 Artist of the Year in 1974.

== Discography ==
=== Singles ===
- I'm on Fire (1973)
- Clap Your Hands And Stamp Your Feet (1973)
- Hurry on Home (1974)
- Stand up like a man (1971)
