= Baby's Got Her Blue Jeans On =

Single by Mel McDaniel

from the album Let It Roll
- B-side: "The Gunfighter's Song"
- Released: October 12, 1984
- Recorded: August 23, 1984
- Genre: Country
- Length: 2:59
- Label: Capitol Nashville
- Songwriter(s): Bob McDill
- Producer(s): Jerry Kennedy

Mel McDaniel singles chronology
| "All Around the Water Tank" (1984) | "Baby's Got Her Blue Jeans On" (1984) | "Let It Roll (Let It Rock)" (1985) |

"Baby's Got Her Blue Jeans On" is a song written by Bob McDill and recorded by American country music artist Mel McDaniel. It was released in October 1984 as the lead-off single from his album Let It Roll. It was a number-one hit on the U.S. Billboard Hot Country Songs chart in February 1985, and Mel McDaniel's only number-one single.

== Background ==
Conway Twitty received the song but decided John Anderson's vocals were better suited for it, so he sent it to him. Not knowing who had sent him the song, Anderson turned it down. Mel McDaniel eventually received the song, and he recorded it.

== Critical reception ==
Kip Kirby, of Billboard magazine reviewed the song favorably, calling it a "change of pace for McDaniel, who here ogles the national treasure alluded to in the title, while absolving the bearer of lascivious intent."

== Covers ==
Sammy Kershaw covered this song on his 2006 album Honky Tonk Boots, where it was released as a single, although his version failed to chart. He also released a music video for his version.

== Charts ==
"Baby's Got Her Blue Jeans On" debuted at number 75 on the U.S. Billboard Hot Country Singles for the week of November 10, 1984.

=== Weekly charts ===
| Chart (1984–85) | Peak position |
|---|---|
| US Hot Country Songs (Billboard) | 1 |
| Canadian RPM Country Tracks | 1 |

=== Year-end charts ===
| Chart (1985) | Position |
|---|---|
| US Hot Country Songs (Billboard) | 12 |
