= John L. Wasserman =

- Born: August 13, 1938
- Died: February 25, 1979 (aged 40); South San Francisco, California
- Occupations: entertainment critic; columnist
- Years active: 1964–1979
- Employer: San Francisco Chronicle

John L. Wasserman (August 13, 1938 – February 25, 1979) was an American entertainment critic for the San Francisco Chronicle from 1964 until the time of his death in 1979. Known more for humor and originality than in-depth analysis, he's best known for his creative reviews of bad films, clever skewering of glitzy performers, and passionate advocacy for those in whose talents he believed.

== Early life ==
Son of a political scientist and elementary school teacher, Wasserman attended Tamalpais High School in Mill Valley, California and was editor of the school paper, the Tamalpais News. Never having graduated from college (he attended Whitman College for two years and the College of Marin for a time, crediting it as his best educational experience), Wasserman worked at many jobs including copy boy at the Chronicle before landing a position at the paper at age 24 when an opening for an assistant critic came up in the paper's entertainment department. His audition review, A GATHERING OF EAGLES with Rock Hudson, landed him the job. The paper's executive editor, Bill German, recalled that John's review "was the only one that didn't bore me." Paine Knickerbocker became his mentor at the paper; Judy Stone was his editor for film reviews.

== Writing career ==
Wasserman's most celebrated writing years were 1970 to 1979, when he inherited the late Ralph J. Gleason's column. His columns covered anything vaguely related to entertainment: film, theater, music, comedy, bodybuilding, the evangelist Billy Graham, strippers, flacks, and even live sex shows at the infamous Mitchell Brothers' O'Farrell Theater.

He counted Woody Allen, Joan Baez, poet Michael McClure, Clint Eastwood, Lily Tomlin, Bill Graham and numerous other celebrities among his friends. He could count Jerry Lewis, Russ Meyer, countless music promoters and crowds of Osmond fans among his detractors.

Dressed all in black and always in a hurry, with an infectious laugh, he was a highly visible presence in San Francisco. He was the first person Marty Balin asked to manage Jefferson Airplane(he turned it down). He taught an annual "Media and the Arts" extension course for San Francisco State and was an expert witness in obscenity trials. He served as a stand-in for George C. Scott on the set of PETULIA and Clint Eastwood on the set of THE ENFORCER. He also did a brief walk-on in the motorcycle film C.C. AND COMPANY. He wrote the first serious review of a male porn film, KANSAS CITY TRUCKIN, for the SF Chronicle.

== Death ==
He died in a car accident on February 25, 1979, south of San Francisco, in which two others in another car were also killed. His blood alcohol level was found to be .26, nearly three times the legal limit at the time, and he was driving the wrong way on the freeway.

== Posthumous publications ==
A collection of more than 90 of his reviews and columns, and a narrative about his life based on interviews conducted after his death, by his journalist sister, Abby Wasserman, was published by Chronicle Books in 1993. The book is Praise, Vilification & Sexual Innuendo, or How to Be a Critic: The Selected Writings of John L. Wasserman, 1964-1979.
