= Russell Smith (singer) =

American singer-songwriter (1949–2019)

- Born: Howard Russell Smith; June 17, 1949; Nashville, Tennessee, U.S.
- Died: July 12, 2019 (aged 70) Franklin, Tennessee, U.S.
- Genres: Country, rock
- Occupation: Singer-songwriter
- Years active: 1972–2019
- Labels: Capitol; Epic; Muscle Shoals
- Formerly of: The Amazing Rhythm Aces; Run C&W

Howard Russell Smith (June 17, 1949 – July 12, 2019) was an American singer and songwriter. He was the lead singer of the groups The Amazing Rhythm Aces and Run C&W. As a solo artist, he released four studio albums and charted five singles on the Billboard Hot Country Singles chart between 1984 and 1989.

== Early life and career ==
Smith was born in Nashville and grew up in Lafayette, Tennessee. The Amazing Rhythm Aces were formed in 1972 with Smith as lead singer. The band recorded six studio albums for ABC Records before disbanding in 1981. In 1982, Smith signed with Capitol Records and released two albums for the label, Russell Smith (1982) and The Boy Next Door (1984). He later signed with Epic Records in 1988, where he released This Little Town in 1989. His highest-charting single, "I Wonder What She's Doing Tonight," peaked at number 37 on the Billboard Hot Country Singles chart in 1989. In 1993, Smith became the lead singer of bluegrass novelty group Run C&W.

Smith also found success as a songwriter, penning Number One songs for Randy Travis ("Look Heart, No Hands"), T. Graham Brown ("Don't Go to Strangers"), Don Williams ("Heartbeat in the Darkness"), and Ricky Van Shelton ("Keep It Between the Lines"). In addition, he wrote "Big Ole Brew" which became a No. 4 country hit for Mel McDaniel in 1982.

The Amazing Rhythm Aces reunited in 1994 and continued to record and tour until Smith died on July 12, 2019, at age 70, following a cancer diagnosis.

== Discography ==
=== Albums ===
Year	Album	Peak positions	Label
Year	Album	US Country	Label
1982	Russell Smith	62	Capitol
1984	The Boy Next Door	—	Capitol
1989	This Little Town	—	Epic
2001	Sunday Best: The Cream of the Solo Albums	—	Raven
2002	The End Is Not in Sight	—	Muscle Shoals
"—" denotes releases that did not chart

=== Singles ===
Year	Single	Peak positions		Album
Year	Single	US Country	CAN Country	Album
1981	"Honky Tonk Freeway"	—	—	Honky Tonk Freeway OST
1982	"Your Eyes"	—	—	Russell Smith
1982	"What I Learned from Loving You"	—	—	Russell Smith
1984	"Where Did We Go Right"	74	—	The Boy Next Door
1988	"Three Piece Suit"	53	—	Non-album singles
1988	"Betty Jean"	49	—	Non-album singles
1989	"I Wonder What She's Doing Tonight"	37	—	This Little Town
1989	"Anger and Tears"	61	90	This Little Town
"—" denotes releases that did not chart

=== Music videos ===
Year	Video
1989	"I Wonder What She's Doing Tonight"
1989	"Anger and Tears"
