= Mel McDaniel =

American country music singer (1942–2011)

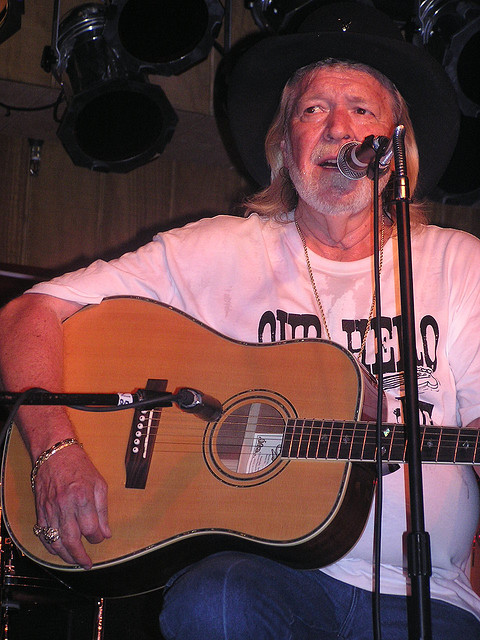
- McDaniel in 2006

Background information
- Born: Melvin Huston McDaniel; September 6, 1942; Checotah, Oklahoma, U.S.
- Origin: Okmulgee, Oklahoma, U.S.
- Died: March 31, 2011 (aged 68) Nashville, Tennessee, U.S.
- Genres: Country; rockabilly; country rock; rock and roll
- Occupations: Singer; songwriter
- Instruments: Vocals; guitar
- Years active: 1975–2011
- Labels: Capitol

Melvin Huston McDaniel (September 6, 1942 – March 31, 2011) was an American country music artist. Many of his top hits were released in the 1980s, including "Louisiana Saturday Night", "Big Ole Brew", "Stand Up", "Baby's Got Her Blue Jeans On" (which reached number one on the country chart), "I Call It Love", "Stand on It", and a remake of Chuck Berry's "Let It Roll (Let It Rock)".

McDaniel's type of country music has been referred to as "the quintessential happy song" in comparison to other country artists who discuss broken hearts and lost loves. When asked why most of his songs were positive in their outlook, McDaniel told the Anchorage Daily News that "there's enough things in the world to keep you bummed out" and that his fans did not want to "hear me singing something that's gonna bum 'em out some more."

== Biography ==
=== Early life ===
McDaniel was born in Checotah, a small town in McIntosh County, Oklahoma, and grew up in Okmulgee, Oklahoma. He was inspired to play music after seeing Elvis Presley on television. His first interest in music was when he learned the trumpet in the fourth grade, but he soon learned the guitar. At age 14, he taught himself the guitar chords to "Frankie and Johnny" and performed at a high-school talent contest. He made his professional debut at age 15 performing in a talent contest at Okmulgee High School. While in high school, he played in several local bands, and after graduation, began working as a musician in Tulsa clubs. While in Tulsa, he recorded several singles for local label J.J. Cale, and wrote and produced his first single, "Lazy Me".

=== Career ===
After marrying his high-school sweetheart, McDaniel began performing in Tulsa. From there, he had an unsuccessful trip to Nashville, followed by quite a bit of success in Anchorage, Alaska, performing at clubs among the oil fields. After two years there, he returned to Nashville and landed a job as a demonstration singer and songwriter with Combine Music. With the help of music publisher Bob Beckham, McDaniel signed to Capitol Records in 1976 and released his first single, "Have a Dream on Me".

His career finally took off with "Louisiana Saturday Night" in 1981, and in early 1985, he scored his only number-one hit with "Baby's Got Her Blue Jeans On". His other top-10 hits include "Right in the Palm of Your Hand" (later covered by Alan Jackson in 1999), "Take Me to the Country", "Big Ole Brew", "I Call It Love", and "Real Good Feel Good Song".

McDaniel became a member of the Grand Ole Opry on January 11, 1986, and made frequent appearances on the show.

McDaniel was inducted into the Oklahoma Music Hall of Fame in 2006, along with induction classmate Leon Russell.

=== Later years, health, and death ===
On November 14, 1996, he had a nearly fatal fall into an orchestra pit while he was performing at the Heymann Performing Arts Center in Lafayette, Louisiana. The accident ended his touring career, and he underwent several surgeries thereafter. McDaniel never fully recovered from his injuries. On June 16, 2009, McDaniel suffered a heart attack, putting him in a medically induced coma in a Nashville area hospital, according to The Tennessean. McDaniel's wife, Peggy, requested the prayers of the singer's fans, saying his situation was "not good." McDaniel recovered from the heart attack, but on February 19, 2011, he was diagnosed with lung cancer, and died at his home on the evening of March 31, as a result of the disease. He was 68 years old.

== Discography ==
- I'm Countryfied (1980)

== Awards and nominations ==
=== Grammy Awards ===
| Year | Nominee / work | Award | Result |
|---|---|---|---|
| 1986 | "Baby's Got Her Blue Jeans On" | Best Male Country Vocal Performance | Nominated |

=== American Music Awards ===
| Year | Nominee / work | Award | Result |
|---|---|---|---|
| 1987 | Mel McDaniel | Favorite Country Male Video Artist | Nominated |

=== Music City News Country Awards ===
| Year | Nominee / work | Award | Result |
|---|---|---|---|
| 1986 | "Baby's Got Her Blue Jeans On" | Single of the Year | Nominated |

=== Academy of Country Music Awards ===
| Year | Nominee / work | Award | Result |
|---|---|---|---|
| 1978 | Mel McDaniel | Top New Male Vocalist | Nominated |
| 1986 | "Baby's Got Her Blue Jeans On" | Single Record of the Year | Nominated |
| 1986 | "Baby's Got Her Blue Jeans On" | Song of the Year | Nominated |

=== Country Music Association Awards ===
| Year | Nominee / work | Award | Result |
|---|---|---|---|
| 1985 | Mel McDaniel | Horizon Award | Nominated |
| 1985 | "Baby's Got Her Blue Jeans On" | Single of the Year | Nominated |

== Bibliography ==
- Millard, Bob (1998). "Mel McDaniel". In The Encyclopedia of Country Music. Paul Kingsbury, Editor. New York: Oxford University Press. p. 337.
