= The Bellamy Brothers discography =

- Studio albums: 37
- Live albums: 1
- Compilation albums: 19
- Singles: 85
- Music videos: 34
- #1 singles: 12

The discography of the American country music duo The Bellamy Brothers consists of 37 studio albums and 85 singles. The duo charted for the first time in 1976 with "Let Your Love Flow", a #1 on the Billboard Hot 100. Although they only charted one other top 40 pop hit, they charted 26 top 10 country hits.

== Studio albums ==
=== 1970s albums ===
Title	Details	Peak chart positions						Certifications
Title	Details	US	US Country	AUS	CAN Country	CAN	UK	Certifications
Let Your Love Flow^{[A]}	Release date: 1976; Label: Warner Bros./Curb	69	—	19	—	75	21	BPI: Silver
Plain & Fancy	Release date: 1977; Label: Warner Bros./Curb	—	—	87	—	—	—	
Beautiful Friends	Release date: 1978; Label: Warner Bros./Curb	—	—	—	—	—	—	
The Two and Only	Release date: 1979; Label: Warner Bros./Curb	—	9	86	12	—	—	
"—" denotes releases that did not chart

=== 1980s albums ===
Title	Details	Peak positions
Title	Details	US Country
You Can Get Crazy	Release date: 1980; Label: Warner Bros./Curb	9
Sons of the Sun	Release date: 1980; Label: Warner Bros./Curb	18
When We Were Boys	Release date: 1982; Label: Elektra/Curb	15
Strong Weakness	Release date: 1982; Label: Elektra/Curb	17
Restless	Release date: 1984; Label: MCA/Curb	22
Howard & David	Release date: 1985; Label: MCA/Curb	10
Country Rap	Release date: 1986; Label: MCA/Curb	21
Crazy from the Heart	Release date: 1987; Label: MCA/Curb	50
Rebels Without a Clue	Release date: September 19, 1988; Label: MCA/Curb	45

=== 1990s albums ===
Title	Details	Peak positions
Title	Details	US Country
Reality Check	Release date: May 29, 1990; Label: MCA/Curb	71
Rollin' Thunder	Release date: April 30, 1991; Label: Atlantic	—
Neon Cowboy	Release date: 1991; Label: Bellamy Brothers Records	—
Beggars and Heroes	Release date: 1992; Label: Bellamy Brothers Records	—
Nobody's Perfect	Release date: 1994; Label: Bellamy Brothers Records	—
Rip Off the Knob	Release date: 1994; Label: Bellamy Brothers Records	—
Take Me Home	Release date: 1994; Label: Bellamy Brothers Records	—
Sons of Beaches^{[B]}	Release date: 1995; Label: Bellamy Brothers Records	—
Tropical Christmas	Release date: 1996; Label: Bellamy Brothers Records	—
Dancin'	Release date: 1996; Label: Bellamy Brothers Records	—
Over the Line	Release date: 1997; Label: Bellamy Brothers Records	—
Reggae Cowboys	Release date: 1998; Label: Bellamy Brothers Records	—
Live at Gilley's	Release date: 1999; Label: Atlantic Records	—
Lonely Planet	Release date: 1999; Label: Blue Hat Records	—
"—" denotes releases that did not chart

=== 2000s albums ===
Title	Details
Reason for the Season	Release date: 2002; Label: Curb
Jesus Is Coming	Release date: 2007; Label: Curb

=== 2010s albums ===
Title	Details
The Greatest Hits Sessions (featuring Gölä)	Release date: 2010; Label: Universal Music Group
BB&G Platinum (featuring Gölä)	Release date: 2011; Label: Universal Music Group
Simply the Best (with DJ Ötzi)	Release date: 2012; Label: Universal Music Group
Pray for Me	Release date: 2012; Label: Bellamy Brothers Records
Bellamy Brothers & Friends: Across the Sea	Release date: 2013; Label: Universal Music Group
Mermaid Cowgirl	Release date: 2014; Label: Universal Music Group
40 Years: The Album	Release date: 2016; Label: Bellamy Brothers Records
Over the Moon	Release date: 2019; Label: Bellamy Brothers Records

=== 2020s albums ===
Title	Details
Covers from the Brothers	Release date: 2021; Label: Bellamy Brothers Records

== Compilation albums ==
Title	Details	Peak positions
Title	Details	US Country
Greatest Hits	Release date: 1982; Label: Warner Bros./Curb	9
Greatest Hits Volume Two	Release date: 1986; Label: MCA/Curb	27
Greatest Hits Volume III	Release date: 1989; Label: MCA/Curb	50
The Latest and the Greatest	Release date: 1992; Label: Bellamy Brothers Records	68
Let Your Love Flow	Release date: 1994; Label: Bellamy Brothers Records	—
Best of the Bellamy Brothers	Release date: 1994; Label: Curb	—
Let Your Love Flow	Release date: 1999; Label: Delta	—
The 25 Year Collection	Release date: 2001; Label: Delta	—
Redneck Girls Forever	Release date: 2002; Label: Curb	—
Best of the Bellamy Brothers	Release date: 2004; Label: Curb	—
Angels and Outlaws, Vol. 1	Release date: 2005; Label: Curb	—
The Lost Tracks	Release date: 2006; Label: Bellamy Brothers Records	—
Number One Hits	Release date: 2008; Label: Curb	—
The Anthology, Vol. 1	Release date: 2009; Label: Bellamy Brothers Records	—
The Biggest Hits of The Bellamy Brothers	Release date: 2018; Label: Curb	—
"—" denotes releases that did not chart

== Singles ==
=== 1970s singles ===
Year	Title	Peak chart positions										Certifications	Album
Year	Title	US	US Country	US AC	AUS	CAN	CAN Country	CAN AC	GER	SWI	UK	Certifications	Album
1976	"Let Your Love Flow"	1	21	2	6	3	42	1	1	1	7	BPI: Platinum	Let Your Love Flow
1976	"Hell Cat"	70	—	—	—	—	—	—	—	—	—		Let Your Love Flow
1976	"Satin Sheets"	73	—	—	65	84	—	—	—	—	43		Let Your Love Flow
1976	"Highway 2-18"	—	—	—	—	—	—	—	—	—	—		Let Your Love Flow
1977	"Crossfire"	—	—	—	39	—	—	—	—	—	—		Plain and Fancy
1977	"Can Somebody Hear Me Now"	—	—	—	—	—	—	—	—	—	—		Plain and Fancy
1977	"Memorabilia"	—	—	—	—	—	—	—	—	—	—		Plain and Fancy
1978	"Bird Dog"	—	86	—	—	—	—	—	—	—	—		Beautiful Friends
1978	"Slippin' Away"	—	19	—	—	—	75	—	—	—	—		Beautiful Friends
1978	"Wild Honey"	—	99	—	—	—	—	—	—	—	—		Beautiful Friends
1978	"Lovin' On"	—	16	—	—	—	25	—	—	—	—		The Two and Only
1979	"If I Said You Have a Beautiful Body Would You Hold It Against Me"	39	1	—	12	—	24	—	—	2	3	BPI: Silver	The Two and Only
1979	"You Ain't Just Whistlin' Dixie"	—	5	—	—	—	11	—	—	—	—		The Two and Only
"—" denotes releases that did not chart

=== 1980s singles ===
Year	Title	Peak chart positions			Album
Year	Title	US Country	CAN Country	SWI	Album
1980	"Sugar Daddy"	1	2	—	You Can Get Crazy
1980	"Dancin' Cowboys"	1	4	—	You Can Get Crazy
1980	"Lovers Live Longer"	3	30	—	Sons of the Sun
1981	"Do You Love as Good as You Look"	1	4	—	Sons of the Sun
1981	"They Could Put Me in Jail"	12	—	—	—N/a
1981	"You're My Favorite Star"	7	16	—	—N/a
1981	"It's So Close to Christmas (And I'm So Far from Home)"	62	—	—	—N/a
1982	"For All the Wrong Reasons"	1	20	—	When We Were Boys
1982	"Get into Reggae Cowboy"	21	9	—	When We Were Boys
1982	"Redneck Girl"	1	7	—	Strong Weakness
1983	"When I'm Away from You"	1	5	—	Strong Weakness
1983	"I Love Her Mind"	4	3	—	Strong Weakness
1983	"Strong Weakness"	15	15	—	Strong Weakness
1984	"Forget About Me"	5	13	—	Restless
1984	"World's Greatest Lover"	6	45	—	Restless
1985	"I Need More of You"	1	4	57	Restless
1985	"Old Hippie"	2	1	—	Howard & David
1985	"Lie to You for Your Love"	2	3	—	Howard & David
1986	"Feelin' the Feelin'"	2	8	—	Howard & David
1986	"Too Much Is Not Enough" (with The Forester Sisters)	1	1	—	Country Rap
1987	"Kids of the Baby Boom"	1	3	—	Country Rap
1987	"Country Rap"	31	39	—	Country Rap
1987	"Crazy from the Heart"	3	7	—	Crazy from the Heart
1988	"Santa Fe"	5	2	—	Crazy from the Heart
1988	"I'll Give You All My Love Tonight"	6	12	—	Crazy from the Heart
1988	"Rebels Without a Clue"	9	19	—	Rebels Without a Clue
1989	"Big Love"	5	—	—	Rebels Without a Clue
1989	"Hillbilly Hell"	51	74	—	Greatest Hits Volume III
1989	"You'll Never Be Sorry"	10	14	—	Greatest Hits Volume III
1989	"The Center of My Universe"	37	43	—	Greatest Hits Volume III
"—" denotes releases that did not chart

=== 1990s singles ===
Year	Title	Peak chart positions		Album
Year	Title	US Country	CAN Country	Album
1990	"I Could Be Persuaded"	7	8	Reality Check
1990	"Lord Get Me Over the Fall"	—	—	—N/a
1991	"She Don't Know That She's Perfect"	46	42	Rollin' Thunder
1991	"All in the Name of Love"	74	—	Rollin' Thunder
1992	"Cowboy Beat"	23	—	The Latest and The Greatest
1992	"Can I Come On Home to You"	64	—	The Latest and The Greatest
1992	"A Hard Way to Make an Easy Living"	62	—	The Latest and The Greatest
1993	"Rip Off the Knob"	66	89	Rip Off the Knob
1993	"Get into Reggae Cowboy" (dance mix)	—	—	Rip Off the Knob
1994	"Not"	71	—	Rip Off the Knob
1994	"On a Summer Night"	—	—	Nobody's Perfect
1995	"Big Hair"	—	—	Sons of Beaches
1996	"Old Hippie (The Sequel)"	—	—	Sons of Beaches
1996	"We Dared the Lightning"	—	—	Sons of Beaches
1996	"She's Awesome"	—	—	Sons of Beaches
1997	"Shine Them Buckles"	—	—	Sons of Beaches
1997	"Catahoula" (with Eddy Raven and Jo-El Sonnier)	—	—	Over the Line
1997	"Over the Line"	—	—	Over the Line
1997	"Tough Love"	—	—	Over the Line
1997	"Tropical Christmas"	—	—	Tropical Christmas
1998	"Almost Jamaica"	—	—	Reggae Cowboys
1999	"Some Broken Hearts Never Mend"	—	—	Reggae Cowboys
1999	"(Don't Put Me In) The Ex-Files" (with Buck Owens)	—	—	Lonely Planet
1999	"Vertical Expression (Of Horizontal Desire)"	—	—	Lonely Planet
1999	"Come Back Gene and Roy"	—	—	Lonely Planet
"—" denotes releases that did not chart

=== 2000s singles ===
Year	Title	Peak chart positions		Album
Year	Title	US Country	UK	Album
2001	"What'll I Do"	—	—	The 25 Year Collection
2005	"If I Said You Had a Beautiful Body (Would You Hold It Against Me)" (re-recording with Dolly Parton)	60	—	Angels and Outlaws, Vol. 1
2005	"You Ain't Just Whistlin' Dixie" (re-recording with Alan Jackson)	—	—	Angels and Outlaws, Vol. 1
2007	"Drug Problem"	—	—	Jesus Is Coming
2008	"Let Your Love Flow" (re-entry)	—	21	Let Your Love Flow
2009	"Lord Help Me Be the Kind of Person My Dog Thinks I Am"	—	—	Jesus Is Coming
2009	"Guilty of the Crime" (with The Bacon Brothers)	—	—	The Anthology, Vol. 1
"—" denotes releases that did not chart

=== 2010s and 2020s singles ===
Year	Title	Peak positions	Album
Year	Title	SWI	Album
2010	"Heart of My Heart"	—	The Anthology, Vol. 1
2010	"Back in the Day"	—	Let Your Love Flow: The Ultimate Bellamy Brothers Collection
2010	"Swan" (with Gölä)	26	The Greatest Hits Sessions
2010	"Let Your Love Flow" (with Gölä)	45	The Greatest Hits Sessions
2010	"Jalapeños"	—	40 Years
2014	"Boobs"	—	40 Years
2015	"Dying Breed"	—	40 Years
2019	"Over the Moon"	—	Over the Moon
2019	"If You Ever Leave"	—	Over the Moon
2023	"I'd Lie to You for Your Love" (re-recording with K. T. Oslin)	—	Double Dog Dare
"—" denotes releases that did not chart

=== As a featured artist ===
Year	Title	Peak chart positions		Album
Year	Title	US Country	CAN Country	Album
1990	"Drive South" (The Forester Sisters with the Bellamy Brothers)	63	60	Come Hold Me

== Music videos ==
Year	Song title	Director(s)
1976	"Let Your Love Flow"	
1983	"When I'm Away from You"	
1983	"I Love Her Mind"	
1987	"Santa Fe"	David Montgomery
1989	"You'll Never Be Sorry"	Wayne Miller
1990	"I Could Be Persuaded"	
1991	"She Don't Know That She's Perfect"	
1992	"Cowboy Beat"	Wayne Miller
1992	"Can I Come Home to You"	
1992	"On a Summer Night"	
1993	"Hard Way to Make an Easy Livin'"	
1993	"Rip Off the Knob"	Wayne Miller
1994	"Not"	
1995	"Big Hair"	Chris Rogers
1996	"Dance Medley"	
1996	"Old Hippie (The Sequel)"	Tom Bevins
1996	"We Dared the Lightning"	Chris Rogers
1996	"She's Awesome"	Tom Bevins
1996	"We All Get Crazy at Christmas"	Tom Bevins
1997	"Shine Them Buckles"	Tom Bevins
1997	"Over the Line"	Tom Bevins
1997	"Catahoula" with Eddy Raven and Jo-el Sonnier	
1998	"Almost Jamaica"	
1999	"Some Broken Hearts"	
1999	"A Vertical Expression (Of Horizontal Desire)"	John Ramsey
1999	"The Ex Files" (with Buck Owens)	
2001	"What'll I Do"	
2001	"Desperados In Love"	
2009	"Guilty of the Crime" (with the Bacon Brothers)	
2010	"Jalapeños"	The Bellamy Brothers
2011	"Mexico Came Here"	The Bellamy Brothers
2014	"Boobs"	The Bellamy Brothers
2014	"Mermaid Cowgirl" (with Gola)	The Bellamy Brothers
2015	"Dyin' Breed"	The Bellamy Brothers
2015	"Let Your Love Flow" (Susan G. Komen Breast Cancer Version)	Derrek Kupish
2019	"If You Ever Leave"	Derrek Kupish
2019	"Over The Moon"	Derrek Kupish
2021	"No Country Music for Old Men" (with John Anderson)	Derrek Kupish
2021	"I Can Help" (with Dennis Quaid)	Derrek Kupish
2022	"Like She's Not Yours" (with Charles J & Conquistadors)	Charles J Jones

== Notes ==
- A Let Your Love Flow was released in UK and Scandinavia in 1976, titled Bellamy Brothers featuring "Let Your Love Flow" (and Others), on the Warner Bros. Records/Curb/GS label.
- B Sons of Beaches was also released under the title Native American on the Jupiter label in 1995.
