= Greatest Hits Volume Two (The Bellamy Brothers album) =

Greatest hits album by The Bellamy Brothers
- Released: 1986
- Genre: Country
- Length: 36:48
- Label: MCA
- Producer: Emory Gordy Jr. Jimmy Bowen; The Bellamy Brothers; Steve Klein

The Bellamy Brothers chronology
Country Rap (1986)	Greatest Hits Volume Two (1986)	Crazy from the Heart (1987)

Greatest Hits Volume Two is the second compilation album by American country music duo The Bellamy Brothers. It was released in 1986 via MCA and Curb Records.

== Track listing ==
No.	Title	Writer(s)	Length
1.	"Feelin' the Feelin'"	David Bellamy	3:40
2.	"When I'm Away from You"	Frankie Miller	3:50
3.	"Old Hippie"	D. Bellamy	4:03
4.	"Lie to You for Your Love"	D. Bellamy, Howard Bellamy, Frankie Miller, Jeff Barry	3:52
5.	"Too Much Is Not Enough"	D. Bellamy, Ron Taylor	3:52
6.	"Forget About Me"	Miller, Troy Seals, Eddie Setser	3:34
7.	"World's Greatest Lover"	D. Bellamy	4:21
8.	"I Need More of You"	D. Bellamy	3:25
9.	"Strong Weakness"	D. Bellamy	3:26
10.	"I Love Her Mind"	D. Bellamy	3:15

== Chart performance ==
Chart (1986)	Peak position
US Top Country Albums (Billboard)	27
