= Greatest Hits (The Bellamy Brothers album) =

Greatest hits album by The Bellamy Brothers
- Released: 1982
- Genre: Country
- Length: 34:45
- Label: Warner Bros/Curb
- Producer: Phil Gernhard; Tony Scotti; Michael Lloyd; The Bellamy Brothers; Jimmy Bowen

The Bellamy Brothers chronology
Strong Weakness (1982)	Greatest Hits (1982)	Restless (1984)

Greatest Hits is the first compilation album by American country music duo The Bellamy Brothers. It was released in 1982 via Warner Bros. and Curb Records.

== Track listing ==
No.	Title	Writer(s)	Length
1.	"Let Your Love Flow"	Larry E. Williams	3:16
2.	"If I Said You Have a Beautiful Body Would You Hold It Against Me"	David Bellamy	3:14
3.	"You Ain't Just Whistlin' Dixie"	D. Bellamy	4:21
4.	"Sugar Daddy"	D. Bellamy	3:39
5.	"Dancin' Cowboys"	D. Bellamy	3:28
6.	"Lovers Live Longer"	D. Bellamy	3:17
7.	"Do You Love as Good as You Look"	Jerry Gillespie, Charlie Black, Rory Bourke	2:57
8.	"For All the Wrong Reasons"	D. Bellamy	3:56
9.	"Get into Reggae Cowboy"	D. Bellamy	3:15
10.	"Redneck Girl"	D. Bellamy	3:22

== Chart performance ==
Chart (1982)	Peak position
US Top Country Albums (Billboard)	9
