= Greatest Hits Volume III (The Bellamy Brothers album) =

Greatest Hits

Greatest hits album by The Bellamy Brothers
- Released: 1989
- Genre: Country
- Length: 37:54
- Label: MCA/Curb
- Producer: Tony Brown; Emory Gordy Jr. James Stroud; Jimmy Bowen; Michael Lloyd

The Bellamy Brothers chronology
Rebels Without a Clue (1988)	Greatest Hits (1989)	Reality Check (1990)

Singles from Greatest Hits Volume III
- 1. "Hillbilly Hell" Released: April 1989; 2. "You'll Never Be Sorry" Released: July 1, 1989; 3. "The Center of My Universe" Released: November 11, 1989

Greatest Hits Volume III is the third compilation album by American country music duo The Bellamy Brothers. It was released in 1989 via MCA and Curb Records. The album includes the singles "Hillbilly Hell", "You'll Never Be Sorry" and "The Center of My Universe".

== Track listing ==
No.	Title	Writer(s)	Length
1.	"Hillbilly Hell"	David Bellamy, Bobby Braddock	2:52
2.	"Crazy from the Heart"	D. Bellamy, Don Schlitz	3:36
3.	"The Center of My Universe"	D. Bellamy, Howard Bellamy, Schlitz	3:22
4.	"Kids of the Baby Boom"	D. Bellamy	3:27
5.	"Santa Fe"	D. Bellamy, Ron Taylor	3:41
6.	"I'll Give You All My Love Tonight"	D. Bellamy, Billy Crain, Wally Dentz	4:03
7.	"You'll Never Be Sorry"	D. Bellamy, H. Bellamy, Schlitz	3:23
8.	"Rebels Without a Clue"	D. Bellamy	3:16
9.	"Big Love"	D. Bellamy	3:19
10.	"Country Rap"	D. Bellamy	2:31
11.	"You're My Favorite Star"	D. Bellamy	2:58

== Chart performance ==
Chart (1989)	Peak position
US Top Country Albums (Billboard)	50
