= The Latest and the Greatest =

Greatest hits album by The Bellamy Brothers
- Released: 1992
- Genre: Country
- Length: 34:40
- Label: Bellamy Brothers
- Producer: The Bellamy Brothers, Ed Seay, Ralph Siegel

The Bellamy Brothers chronology
Neon Cowboy (1991)	The Latest and the Greatest (1992)	Beggars and Heroes (1992)

The Latest and the Greatest is the fourth compilation album by American country music duo The Bellamy Brothers. It was released in 1992 via Bellamy Brothers Records. The albums includes the single "Cowboy Beat".

== Track listing ==
No.	Title	Writer(s)	Length
1.	"Cowboy Beat"	David Bellamy, John Beland	3:27
2.	"Old Hippie"	D. Bellamy	4:00
3.	"Can Come on Home to You"	D. Bellamy	3:21
4.	"Redneck Girl"	D. Bellamy	3:21
5.	"Lie to You for Your Love"	D. Bellamy, Howard Bellamy, Frankie Miller, Jeff Barry	3:24
6.	"Hard Way to Make an Easy Livin'"	D. Bellamy, H. Bellamy, Beland	3:51
7.	"Kids of the Baby Boom"	D. Bellamy	3:24
8.	"She's Gone with the Wind"	D. Bellamy	3:59
9.	"If I Said You Have a Beautiful Body Would You Hold It Against Me"	D. Bellamy	3:09
10.	"Let Your Love Flow"	Larry E. Williams	2:46

== Chart performance ==
Chart (1992)	Peak position
US Top Country Albums (Billboard)	68
