= Strong Weakness =

Strong Weakness may refer to:

- Strong Weakness (song), a 1983 song by The Bellamy Brothers
- Strong Weakness (album), a 1982 album by The Bellamy Brothers
