= Rebels Without a Clue =

Rebels Without a Clue may refer to:

- Rebels Without a Clue (song), a 1988 song by The Bellamy Brothers
- Rebels Without a Clue (album), a 1988 album by The Bellamy Brothers

== See also ==
- Rebel Without a Clue (disambiguation)
