= World's Greatest Lover =

World's Greatest Lover may refer to:

- The World's Greatest Lover, 1977 American comedy film
- "World's Greatest Lover" (Cheap Trick song), 1980
- "World's Greatest Lover" (The Bellamy Brothers song), 1984
