= Tony Blondal =

Canadian composer

Tony Blondal is a film and television orchestrator and conductor, and record arranger. He started out his musical career playing live (guitar) and doing studio recording sessions (guitar, mandolin, banjo, balalaika, charango and various instruments). He also pursued his other interests, which were writing orchestral and band arrangements for singers, and big band writing and arranging. Through this early work he met a group of TV composers who were busy and needed someone to help orchestrate and copy their music for weekly recording sessions. That experience led to other opportunities and started him on a new path, and he soon transitioned to film orchestration. To this day he still works in film primarily, but also occasionally in television and video games.

== Education ==
Studied music theory, jazz performance, arranging and film composition at Western Washington University and the famous Dick Grove School of Music. Also studied privately with Jack Smalley and David Angel among others.

== Career ==
Has orchestrated more than 100 feature films, as well as several TV series and video games. He is most known for his many collaborations with Rolfe Kent, but has also worked with Ramin Djawadi, Elliot Goldenthal, Henry Jackman, Garry Schyman, Jeff Cardoni, Andrew Gross, Christopher Young, Craig Armstrong, Andrea Morricone and others.

As an arranger, he has worked with recording artists such as Peabo Bryson, Sheena Easton, Jeffrey Osborne, Melissa Manchester and Natalie Cole. He did arrangements for various artists on the Colors of Christmas Tour, the Elvis Lives Tour, and has done charts for The Tonight Show, Pat Sajack Show and The Arsenio Hall Show. He was also part of the Music Director's Emmy award winning team for the 2007 TV Special MOVIES ROCK. Arranging for Usher for his Singin' In The Rain tribute, in addition to composing additional music.

He also contributes regularly to the trailer libraries of Immediate Music, Killer Tracks and Firstcom/Universal.

Has been featured in Film Score Monthly (FSM Online) Magazine.
