= The Two and Only =

Studio album by the Bellamy Brothers
- Released: 1979
- Genre: Country
- Label: Warner Bros./Curb
- Producer: Michael Lloyd

The Bellamy Brothers chronology
Beautiful Friends (1978)	The Two and Only (1979)	You Can Get Crazy (1980)

Singles from The Two and Only
- 1. "If I Said You Have a Beautiful Body Would You Hold It Against Me" Released: March 1979; 2. "You Ain't Just Whistlin' Dixie" Released: August 18, 1979

Professional ratings
Review scores
Source	Rating
AllMusic	3.5/5 stars
The Encyclopedia of Popular Music	2/5 stars
Music Week	2/4 stars

The Two and Only is the fourth studio album by American country music duo the Bellamy Brothers. It was released in 1979 via Warner Bros. Records/Curb Records. It reached No. 9 in the US country charts and No. 12 in Canada. "If I Said You Had a Beautiful Body Would You Hold It Against Me" was nominated for a Grammy Award for "Best Country Vocal Performance by a Duo or Group".

Three singles were released from the album. "Lovin' On" reached No. 16 in the US and No. 25 in the Canadian country charts in 1978. "If I Said You Had a Beautiful Body Would You Hold It Against Me" reached No. 1 in the US country charts, No. 24 in the Canadian country charts, No. 3 in the UK and No. 2 in Switzerland. "You Ain't Just Whistlin' Dixie" reached No. 5 in the US and No. 11 in the Canadian country charts.

== Track listing ==
No.	Title	Writer(s)	Length
1.	"If I Said You Have a Beautiful Body Would You Hold It Against Me"	David Bellamy	3:14
2.	"May You Never"	John Martyn	2:41
3.	"Miss Misunderstood"	D. Bellamy	3:39
4.	"Makin' Music Mamma"	Howard Bellamy	2:54
5.	"You Ain't Just Whistlin' Dixie"	D. Bellamy	4:20
6.	"Lovin' On"	Ben Peters	3:03
7.	"Ole Faithful"	H. Bellamy	3:09
8.	"Why Did We Die So Young"	D. Bellamy	3:12
9.	"Blue Ribbons"	H. Bellamy	4:23
10.	"Wet T-Shirt"	D. Bellamy	2:28

== Personnel ==
The Bellamy Brothers and the Dizzy Rambler Band

- David and Howard Bellamy - lead and harmony vocals, acoustic guitar
- Carl Chambers - lead and acoustic guitars
- Jesse Chambers - bass guitar
- Dannie Jones - steel guitar
- Jon LaFrandre - keyboards
- Rodney Price, Carlos Vega - drums

Production

- Produced and Engineered by Michael Lloyd for Mike Curb Productions.
- Second Engineer: Jim Crosby.
- Mastered at Artisan by Bob McCloud.
- Photography by George Whiteman.
