= You'll Never Be Sorry =

Single by The Bellamy Brothers

from the album Greatest Hits Volume III
- B-side: "Hillbilly Hell"
- Released: July 1, 1989
- Genre: Country
- Length: 3:25
- Label: MCA/Curb
- Songwriters: David Bellamy, Howard Bellamy, Don Schlitz
- Producer: Tony Brown

The Bellamy Brothers singles chronology
"Hillbilly Hell" (1989)	"You'll Never Be Sorry" (1989)	"The Center of My Universe" (1989)

"You'll Never Be Sorry" is a song co-written and recorded by American country music duo The Bellamy Brothers. It was released in July 1989 as the second single from their Greatest Hits Volume III compilation album. The song reached number 10 on the Billboard Hot Country Singles & Tracks chart. It was written by David Bellamy, Howard Bellamy and Don Schlitz.

== Chart performance ==
Chart (1989)	Peak position
Canada Country Singles (RPM)	14
US Hot Country Songs (Billboard)	10

=== Year-end charts ===
Chart (1989)	Position
US Country Songs (Billboard)	86
