= Crazy from the Heart (album) =

Studio album by The Bellamy Brothers
- Released: 1987
- Genre: Country
- Length: 35:26
- Label: MCA/Curb
- Producer: Emory Gordy Jr.

The Bellamy Brothers chronology
Greatest Hits Volume Two (1986)	Crazy from the Heart (1987)	Rebels Without a Clue (1988)

Singles from Crazy from the Heart
- 1. "Crazy from the Heart" Released: August 15, 1987; 2. "Santa Fe" Released: January 9, 1988; 3. "I'll Give You All My Love Tonight" Released: May 7, 1988

Crazy From the Heart is the twelfth studio album by American country music duo The Bellamy Brothers. It was released in 1987 via MCA and Curb Records. The album includes the singles "Crazy from the Heart", "Santa Fe" and "I'll Give You All My Love Tonight".

== Track listing ==
No.	Title	Writer(s)	Length
1.	"Crazy from the Heart"	David Bellamy, Don Schlitz	3:34
2.	"I'll Give You All My Love Tonight"	D. Bellamy, Billy Crain, Wally Dentz	4:04
3.	"Santa Fe"	D. Bellamy, Ron Taylor	3:41
4.	"It's Rainin' Girls"	D. Bellamy, Richard Bennett	2:55
5.	"Ying Yang"	D. Bellamy	3:04
6.	"Melt Down"	Howard Bellamy	3:59
7.	"Ramblin' Again"	D. Bellamy	2:59
8.	"We Don't Wanna Go for It"	D. Bellamy	3:59
9.	"Your Name"	D. Bellamy, Bennett, Simon Stokes	3:58
10.	"White Trash"	D. Bellamy	3:13

== Personnel ==
Adapted from liner notes.

=== The Bellamy Brothers ===
- David Bellamy - lead vocals
- Howard Bellamy - lead & harmony vocals

=== Musicians ===
- Matt Betton - drums
- Billy Crain - electric guitar
- Charlie Daniels - harmony vocals
- Wally Dentz - harmonica
- David Hungate - bass guitar
- John Barlow Jarvis - DX-7, piano
- Mike Lawler - synthesizer
- Patty Loveless - harmony vocals
- George Terry - acoustic guitar, electric guitar
- Billy Joe Walker Jr. - acoustic guitar
- Reggie Young - electric guitar

== Chart performance ==
Chart (1987)	Peak position
US Top Country Albums (Billboard)	50
