= Honky Tonk Ranch =

American reality television series

Honky Tonk Ranch is a reality television series that focuses on the country musical group the Bellamy Brothers. During the course of the series, the brothers are joined by their friends and family members, including musicians they have worked with during the period like Blake Shelton. John Schneider and Tanya Tucker. The series debuted on April 8, 2018, on The Cowboy Channel and had 13 episodes. Its second season was broadcast in 2019 on the same network, in addition to both seasons being streamed worldwide by RFD-TV. In 2020, the show moved to Circle Network.
