= Restless (The Bellamy Brothers album) =

Studio album by The Bellamy Brothers
- Released: 1984
- Genre: Country
- Length: 35:47
- Label: MCA/Curb Records
- Producer: The Bellamy Brothers, Steve Klein

The Bellamy Brothers chronology
Greatest Hits (1982)	Restless (1984)	Howard & David (1985)

Singles from Restless
- 1. "Forget About Me" Released: June 2, 1984; 2. "World's Greatest Lover" Released: September 22, 1984; 3. "I Need More of You" Released: January 1985

Restless is the ninth studio album by American country music duo The Bellamy Brothers. It was released in 1984 via MCA and Curb Records.

== Track listing ==
Restless track listing
No.	Title	Writer(s)	Length
1.	"Forget About Me"	Frankie Miller, Troy Seals, Eddie Setser	3:33
2.	"World's Greatest Lover"	David Bellamy	4:20
3.	"Down to You"	D. Bellamy	4:16
4.	"We're Having Some Fun Now"	D. Bellamy	3:32
5.	"Rock-a-Billy"	D. Bellamy	2:21
6.	"Restless"	D. Bellamy	2:45
7.	"I Love It"	Tommy Rocco, Charlie Black	3:02
8.	"Diesel Cafe"	D. Bellamy	4:12
9.	"Tragedy"	Henry Paul, Billy Crain, Wally Dentz	3:45
10.	"I Need More of You"	D. Bellamy	3:21

== Personnel ==
Adapted from liner notes.

=== Bellamy Brothers Band ===
- David & Howard Bellamy - lead and harmony vocals, acoustic guitar
- Billy Crain - lead & rhythm electric guitars, acoustic guitar
- Wally Dentz - bass guitar, harmonica
- Dannie Jones - pedal steel guitar, lap steel guitar
- Jon LaFrandre - keyboards on "Tragedy"
- Juan Perez - drums, percussion

=== Guest Musicians ===
- George Bitzer - keyboards, synthesizer, string & horn arrangements
- George Terry, Joey Murcia - guitars
- Ed Calle - saxophone
- Joe Galdo - drums, programming
- Steve Klein - string & horn arrangements
- Kim Wertz - French girl on "World's Greatest Lover"
- Kitty Woodson - background vocals on "We're Having Some Fun Now
- Chuck Kirkpatrick & John Sambatero - background vocals on "Down to You" & "I Need More of You"

== Chart performance ==
Chart (1984)	Peak position
US Top Country Albums (Billboard)	22
