= Cowboy Beat =

Single by The Bellamy Brothers

from the album The Latest and the Greatest
- Released: June 6, 1992
- Genre: Country, country rock
- Length: 3:29
- Label: Bellamy Brothers
- Songwriter(s): David Bellamy, John Beland
- Producer(s): David Bellamy, Howard Bellamy, Ed Seay

The Bellamy Brothers singles chronology
"All in the Name of Love" (1991)	"Cowboy Beat" (1992)	"Can I Come On Home to You" (1992)

"Cowboy Beat" is a song recorded by American country music duo The Bellamy Brothers. It was released in June 1992 as the first single from their compilation album The Latest and the Greatest. The song reached #23 on the Billboard Hot Country Singles & Tracks chart. It is their last Top 40 hit to date. The song was written by David Bellamy and John Beland.

== Chart performance ==
Chart (1992)	Peak position
US Hot Country Songs (Billboard)	23
