= I Could Be Persuaded =

Single by The Bellamy Brothers

from the album Reality Check
- Released: June 30, 1990
- Genre: Country, country pop, pop rock
- Length: 3:21
- Label: MCA/Curb
- Songwriters: David Bellamy, Howard Bellamy, Don Schlitz
- Producer: Emory Gordy Jr.

The Bellamy Brothers singles chronology
"The Center of My Universe" (1989)	"I Could Be Persuaded" (1990)	"Lord Get Me Over the Fall" (1990)

"I Could Be Persuaded" is a song co-written and recorded by American country music duo The Bellamy Brothers. It was released in June 1990 as the first single from the album Reality Check. The song reached number 7 on the Billboard Hot Country Singles & Tracks chart. It was the duo's last Top 10 hit. It was written by David Bellamy, Howard Bellamy and Don Schlitz.

== Chart performance ==
Chart (1990)	Peak position
Canada Country Singles (RPM)	8
US Hot Country Songs (Billboard)	7

=== Year-end charts ===
Chart (1990)	Position
Canada Country Tracks (RPM)	96
US Country Songs (Billboard)	74
