= Country Rap =

Studio album by The Bellamy Brothers
- Released: 1986
- Genre: Country
- Length: 35:18
- Label: MCA/Curb
- Producer: Emory Gordy Jr.

The Bellamy Brothers chronology
Howard & David (1985)	Country Rap (1986)	Greatest Hits Volume Two (1986)

Singles from Country Rap
- 1. "Too Much Is Not Enough" Released: September 1986; 2. "Kids of the Baby Boom" Released: January 1987; 3. "Country Rap" Released: April 1987

Country Rap is the eleventh studio album by American country music duo The Bellamy Brothers. It was released in 1986 via MCA and Curb Records. The includes the singles "Too Much Is Not Enough", "Kids of the Baby Boom" and "Country Rap". The title track has been cited as one of the first songs to combine country music with rap music.

== Track listing ==
No.	Title	Writer(s)	Length
1.	"Too Much Is Not Enough" (with The Forester Sisters)	David Bellamy, Ron Taylor	3:50
2.	"Sweet Nostalgia"	D. Bellamy	3:53
3.	"Kids of the Baby Boom"	D. Bellamy	3:24
4.	"One Too Many Times"	Howard Bellamy	3:00
5.	"Go Ahead - Fall in Love"	D. Bellamy	3:00
6.	"D-D-D-D-Divorcee"	D. Bellamy	3:36
7.	"Our Family"	D. Bellamy, Bobby Braddock	4:02
8.	"Country Rap"	D. Bellamy	2:30
9.	"Hard On A Heart"	H. Bellamy	3:55
10.	"Where the Lights Come From"	Thom Schuyler, Don Schlitz	3:08

== Personnel ==
Adapted from liner notes.

=== The Bellamy Brothers ===
- David Bellamy - lead & harmony vocals
- Howard Bellamy - lead & harmony vocals

=== Musicians ===
- Richard Bennett - acoustic guitar, electric guitar, lap steel guitar, 6-string bass guitar on "Kids of the Baby Boom"
- Matt Betton - drums
- Wally Dentz - harmonica
- The Forester Sisters - featured vocals on "Too Much Is Not Enough"
- Emory Gordy Jr. - percussion, lead acoustic guitar on "Hard on a Heart", E-mu Emulator on "Go Ahead - Fall in Love"
- David Hungate - bass guitar
- John Barlow Jarvis - Yamaha DX7, piano
- Dannie Jones - steel guitar
- Billy Joe Walker Jr. - acoustic guitar, electric guitar
- Reggie Young - electric guitar, lead electric guitar on "Where the Lights Come From"

== Chart performance ==
Chart (1986)	Peak position
US Top Country Albums (Billboard)	21
