= Circle Country =

Country music streaming television

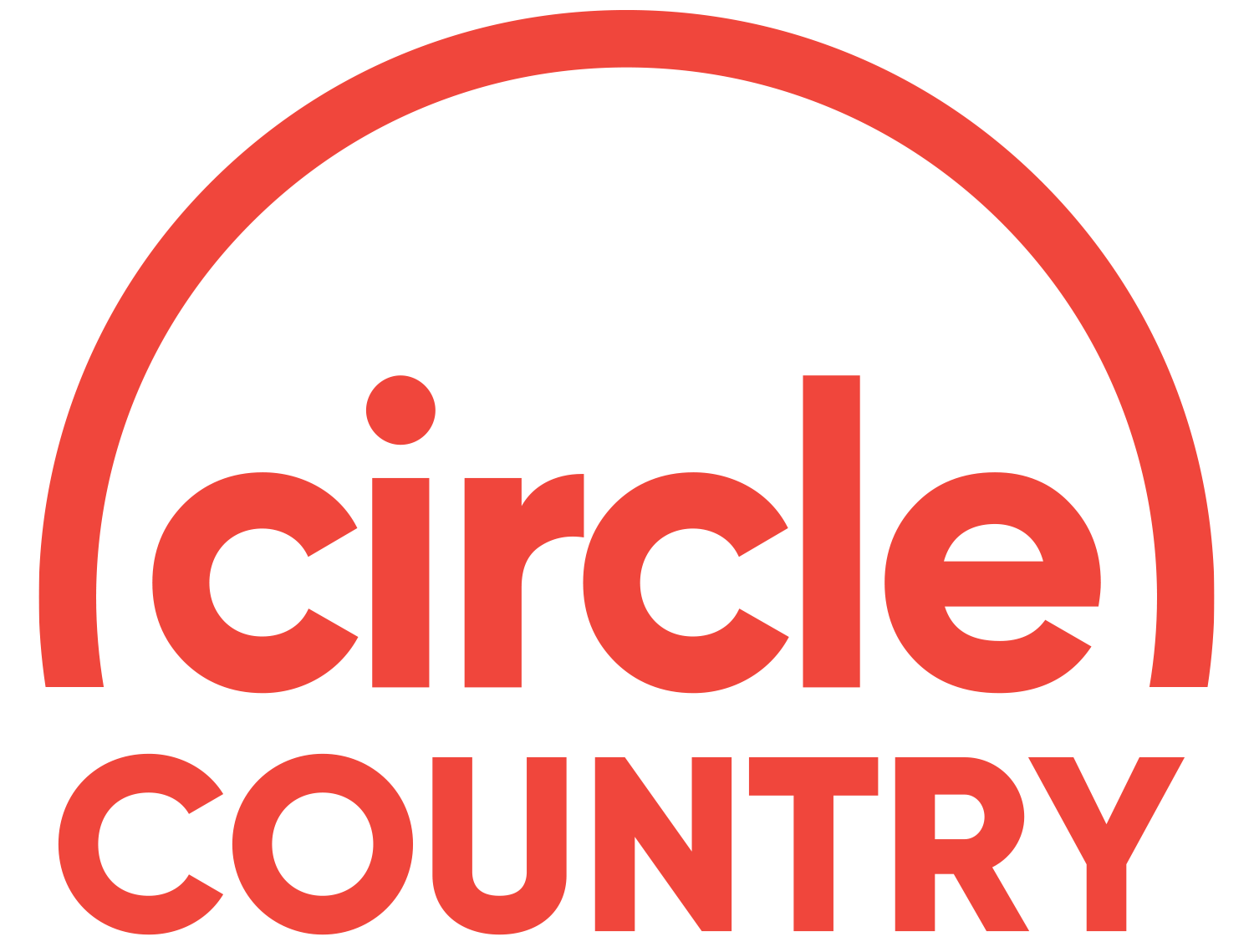
- Type: OTT platform; (Country music, rural/blue collar programming)
- Country: United States
- Headquarters: Nashville, Tennessee

Programming
- Language: English
- Picture format: 1080i (HDTV)

Ownership
- Owner: Gray Media
- Parent: PowerNation

History
- Founded: April 24, 2019; 7 years ago
- Launched: As an OTA channel: January 1, 2020; 6 years ago As a FAST streaming channel: January 1, 2024; 2 years ago
- Closed: As an OTA channel: December 31, 2023; 2 years ago
- Former names: Circle (2020–2023)

Links
- Website: circlecountry.com

Availability

Streaming media
- Service(s): Circle Now App, FuboTV, Peacock, Roku Channel Live TV, Samsung TV Plus, Sling Freestream, Tubi, Vizio WatchFree

Circle Country, previously known as Circle, is a free ad-supported streaming television (FAST) service owned by Gray Media as part of its PowerNation Studios division. The network's programming consists of country music oriented shows, western films and rural/blue collar themed material, featuring a mix of original and off-network shows sourced from Opry Entertainment Group (the owner of the Grand Ole Opry, and Gray Media's former joint venture partner in the channel's previous incarnation as an over-the-air digital subchannel).

Previously before 2024, the network was available primarily through the digital subchannels of broadcast television stations, as well as an ad-supported video-on-demand channel on Peacock and Stirr, along with national carriage on Dish Network and Sling TV. Cable television and IPTV providers were offered either the network's local affiliate, or the network's national feed on their systems.

Circle ended the OTA portion of the channel on December 31, 2023. Streaming of the channel remained available under the Circle Country name. Many of the OTA stations replaced Circle with one of several networks under the new Gray/Lionsgate/Warner Bros. Discovery joint venture Free TV Networks, which is led by broadcasting veteran Jonathan Katz. Opry's programming rights will be utilized on several new AVOD ventures by Opry and NBCUniversal, which took a 30% minority stake in Opry Entertainment in 2022. Programs from the Circle Network continue to be available through various streaming providers on the Circle Country network after the OTA service ended.

== Background ==
Circle Country was Opry Entertainment Group's fourth entry into television network ownership. From its founding in 1983 until 1997, OEG's parent company (Ryman Hospitality Properties), known then as the Gaylord Entertainment Company, was owner of The Nashville Network (TNN). Gaylord later bought a second country music-oriented cable network, Country Music Television (CMT), in 1991. Gaylord Entertainment sold both networks to the CBS Cable unit of CBS Corporation in 1997 for $1.55 billion feeling that the two then-country networks could grow faster as part of a larger media company. Gaylord, however, retained CMT International. Gaylord Cable Networks took its stakes in TV Argentina and CMT International to launch the MusicCountry channel in Mexico and Argentine in 2000. Then on September 1, 2000, the company launched the MusicCountry service in Europe. Gaylord would subsequently rebrand CMT channels in Australia, Brazil, Indonesia, the Philippines, and Asia-Pacific region's areas to the MusicCountry brand.

== History ==
Circle logo used from 2020 to 2023.

Towards the end of the 2010s, Ryman Hospitality Properties was looking to venture back into television, with its Opry Entertainment unit already having co-produced the dramatic series Nashville, along with the end of its partnerships to carry the Opry with CMT, then Great American Country, as their managements both shifted away from music programming and towards a more generic and broad-based focus on Southern culture. In 2018, Ryman had settled on a broadcast television network and began pursuing starting one as they felt country music fans are underserved. Ryman tested nine potential shows via a sizzle reel with excellent responses from focus group sessions.

Ryman and Gray Television announced a joint venture between Gray and Ryman's subsidiary, Opry Entertainment Group on April 24, 2019, to launch a broadcast television network in early 2020 and an online streaming service later. The planned network would feature the Grand Ole Opry archives and performances from the Grand Ole Opry House and other Ryman-owned music venues. On October 17, 2019, the joint venture partners would confirm that Gray-owned stations would be among the network's charter affiliates; they would also reveal on that date the network's name — Circle, which is a nod to the iconic 6-foot wooden section of stage at the Opry House (and that section's original home, Ryman Auditorium) on which various country stars have performed.

On December 16, 2019, Circle's formal launch date of January 1, 2020 was announced for Circle, along with a roster of 16 new programs for the network. Additionally, CBS Television Stations was also announced as joining in Circle's list of charter affiliates, bringing major markets to the network's initial list of stations to 56 affiliates covering 50% of the country. As of October 2020, Circle has 99 affiliates reaching 62.61% of U.S. TV households.

On November 10, 2023, it was announced that Circle as an over-the-air network would cease its broadcast operations on December 31, 2023, as Gray transitions to a new partnership for its digital subchannel networks, Free TV Networks, with Lionsgate and Warner Bros. Discovery. The final regular program to air on Circle as an OTA network was the movie Rio Lobo. The channel continues streaming via the Circle Country network, with select programming such as Coffee, Country & Cody as well as Opry Live. In addition, Opry Live and The Song will continue to be offered over-the-air via the syndication market.

== Programming ==
Previously, Circle (as OTA sub-channel) provided up to 20 hours of programming to its owned-and-operated and affiliated stations on weekdays from 7:00 a.m. to 3:00 a.m. Eastern Time and on weekends from 11:00 a.m. to 3:00 a.m. Eastern Time. The remaining vacated hours were occupied by paid programming.

Circle featured programming geared toward both fans of the country music genre and rural audiences, a similar demographic targeted by competing country music-oriented multicast networks Heartland (which, incidentally from 2012 until 2013, used The Nashville Network moniker once used by Ryman's original cable network venture) and The Country Network. Circle Country's programming primarily features a mix of original and acquired series with a country music or Southern lifestyle-centric format.

Circle previously broadcast two simultaneous feeds: one for digital distribution, and the other for terrestrial distribution. The terrestrial feed (which typically appeared as a digital subchannel of a major network affiliate station in numerous markets around the United States) aired classic movies and off-network syndicated programming, while the digital feed (distributed over streaming services such as Peacock and Roku) features more company-owned music-based programming. Those feeds converged for live programming, such as the daily simulcast of WSM Radio morning show "Coffee, Country & Cody" and Grand Ole Opry broadcasts, as well as during regular timeslots of Circle-produced original programming. As of 2024, the terrestrial feed is no longer available, but the digital (aka streaming) feed remains available as Circle Country, with classic movies being added with the original programming.

As the network was under development, Circle Media developed several original productions for the network's inaugural programming slate—aiming to make it one of a handful of digital multicast services that carry original programming, and one of the few (alongside the Live Well Network, which reduced its national distribution outside of sister networks ABC's owned-and-operated stations in January 2015, and its rebrand Localish) to offer a large original content slate. On December 11, 2019, Circle Media announced that it had greenlit 16 original programs slated to debut on the network in Circle's first five months of operation, including a simulcast of WSM Radio's Coffee, Country & Cody (which had previously aired on competing country music-oriented multicast network Heartland), and the music and interview series The Dailey and Vincent Show which moved from the show's prior four-year home, RFD-TV. and several docu-series (including Craig's World, a reality program centering on country artist Craig Morgan; Fandom, focusing on the artist-fan relationship in country music; Upstream, a fishing/interview program hosted by Elizabeth Cook; and several Grand Ole Opry-focused series such as Opry Debut).

Among the initial offerings were all surviving episodes of Hee Haw.

=== Current programming ===
==== Original programming ====
===== Music/interview programming =====
- Backstage at the Opry (January 1, 2020–present) – Docu-series following artists preparing for performances at the Grand Ole Opry.
- Bluebird Café Sessions (February 2020–present) – Music series featuring performances from popular and up-and-coming country artists, recorded at the iconic Bluebird Café in Nashville.
- Coffee, Country & Cody (January 1, 2020–present) – Television simulcast of the WSM Radio morning program; hosted by Bill Cody with co-host Charlie Mattos and entertainment correspondent Kelly Sutton. The show is produced by occasional co-host Eric Marcum and is broadcast live from WSM Radio's studio inside the Gaylord Opryland Resort & Convention Center.
- The Dailey & Vincent Show (January 1, 2020–present) – Music series hosted by the bluegrass/country/gospel duo of Jamie Dailey and Darrin Vincent featuring solo and collaborative performances with popular country music artists.
- Fandom (February 2020) – Docu-series exploring the relationship between country artists and their fans from each's perspective.
- Opry Live (February 2020–present)—One hour of an episode of the Grand Ole Opry; initially aired live in simulcast with the WSM radio broadcast, since 2021, Opry Live has typically been a pre-recorded live to tape hour of a Tuesday or Friday Opry radio broadcast or previously televised live Saturday broadcast, allowing WSM to continue carrying less demographic-friendly acts, square dances and audience-participation bits.
- My Opry Debut (January 1, 2020–present) – Docu-series chronicling up-and-coming country artists making their debut performance at the Grand Ole Opry.
- Opry Anniversary (January 1, 2020–present) – Docu-series chronicling country artists looking back at their debut performance at the Grand Ole Opry.
- Austin City Limits: Country (June 8-August 17, 2022) - Hosted by singer-songwriter Rodney Crowell, featuring classic Austin City Limits episodes with a country flavor, along with behind-the-scenes, and never-before-seen interviews.
- Opry Docs (January 1, 2020–present) – Docu-series hosted by contemporary artists chronicling the life and careers of legendary country musicians.
- Phil Vassar's Songs from the Cellar (January 2, 2020–present) – Music and interview series hosted by Phil Vassar, featuring interviews with artists, songwriters, entertainers, athletes and wine enthusiasts at his personal wine cellar.
- The Write Stuff (January 7, 2020–present) – Docu-series chronicling the composition steps of country music's greatest songs.

===== Lifestyle/entertainment programming =====
- Authentic America (January 2, 2020–present) – Hosted by veteran television host Nan Kelley and country artist Charlie Kelley, in which the married couple spotlight lesser-known attractions and eateries, and interesting people around the U.S.
- Bellamy Brothers' Honky Tonk Ranch (January 1, 2020–present) – Reality series chronicling country duo David and Howard Bellamy's music career, and home and ranch life.
- Better Half (January 2, 2020–present) – Reality docu-series chronicling the lives of the spouses of country and NASCAR stars.
- Craig's World (February 2020–present) – Docu-series featuring Craig Morgan dealing with the music world, his businesses and his family.
- Family Traditions (February 2020–present) – Docu-series profiling the descendants of legendary country music artists.
- Southern Weekend (January 2, 2020–present) – Travel series highlighting attractions of note across the Southern U.S.; hosted by Natalie Stovall.
- Stand Up Nashville! (January 3, 2020–present) – Stand-up comedy showcase recorded at Zanies Comedy Club in downtown Nashville.
- Upstream (May 2020 – present) – A fishing program featuring host Elizabeth Cook conducting conversations with country artists at various fishing locations.

== Affiliates ==
Previously, Circle had current or pending affiliation agreements with 96 television stations in 96 media markets encompassing 39 states, covering 62.60% (or a total population of 195,620,130 residents) of all households in the United States that own at least one television set. It is also carried as a live channel on NBC's streaming service Peacock, and on Vizio's Free Streaming Channels platform on their current generation of smart TVs.

Before its launch, Circle Media actively sought affiliation agreements with various television station owners to make the Circle network widely available throughout the United States. The network launched with clearance rate of, at minimum, 50% of overall American television households, in part due to affiliation agreements with stations owned by network co-parent Gray Television (initially encompassing 56 of the group's stations, with no clearance in approximately 15 other small-sized markets with a Gray-owned station) and CBS Television Stations, which provided Circle broad clearance in the 25 largest U.S. markets (including New York City, Los Angeles, Philadelphia, San Francisco, Boston, Miami–Fort Lauderdale and Dallas–Fort Worth) through the group's independent stations.

Circle was not available over-the-air in the network's headquarters of Nashville when it launched, but added a digital subchannel of WSMV-TV on January 31, 2020; WSMV-TV was previously owned alongside Ryman's Opry properties from 1950 until 1981, and was briefly affiliated with Heartland, which at launch utilized the trademark of The Nashville Network. Gray announced their purchase of WSMV's parent company, the Meredith Corporation, on May 3, 2021, and the sale was completed on December 1, 2021.

=== Former OTA affiliates ===
Media market	State	Station	Channel	Launch date	Notes
Birmingham	Alabama	WBRC	6.3	January 1, 2020	
Huntsville	Alabama	WAFF	48.3	January 1, 2020	
Mobile	Alabama	WALA	10.5	February 7, 2020	
Montgomery	Alabama	WSFA	12.3	January 1, 2020	
Anchorage	Alaska	KAUU	5.3	January 1, 2020	
Phoenix	Arizona	KTVK	3.3	February 1, 2020	
Tucson	Arizona	KOLD-TV	13.3	January 1, 2020	
Little Rock	Arkansas	KTHV	11.5		
Bakersfield	California	KERO-TV	23.7		
Los Angeles	California	KCAL-TV	9.3	January 1, 2020	
San Francisco	California	KPYX	44.5	January 1, 2020	
Colorado Springs	Colorado	KKTV	11.3	January 6, 2020	
Denver	Colorado	KUSA-TV	9.6	February 28, 2020	
Gainesville	Florida	WCJB-TV	20.4	January 1, 2020	
Miami–Fort Lauderdale	Florida	WBFS-TV	33.5	January 1, 2020	
Panama City	Florida	WECP-LD	18.3	January 1, 2020	
Sarasota	Florida	WWSB	40.2	January 1, 2020	
St. Petersburg–Tampa	Florida	WTOG	44.5	January 1, 2020	
Tallahassee	Florida	WCTV	6.3	January 1, 2020	
West Palm Beach	Florida	WFLX	29.3	January 1, 2020	
Albany	Georgia	WALB	10.5	January 1, 2020	
Albany	Georgia	WGCW-LD	36.2	January 1, 2020	
Atlanta	Georgia	WPCH-TV	17.4	January 1, 2020	
Augusta	Georgia	WRDW-TV	12.4	January 1, 2020	
Columbus	Georgia	WTVM	9.3	January 1, 2020	
Savannah	Georgia	WTOC-TV	11.3	January 1, 2020	
Honolulu	Hawaii	KGMB	5.2	January 1, 2020	
Boise	Idaho	KNIN-TV	9.4	January 1, 2020	
Chicago	Illinois	WBBM-TV	2.5	February 2023	
Rockford	Illinois	WIFR-LD	23.3	January 1, 2020	
Evansville	Indiana	WFIE	14.3	January 1, 2020	
Indianapolis	Indiana	WTHR	13.6	February 2020	
South Bend	Indiana	WNDU-TV	16.3	January 1, 2020	
Davenport	Iowa	KWQC-TV	6.6	January 1, 2021	
Ottumwa	Iowa	KYOU-TV	15.3	January 1, 2020	
Sioux City	Iowa	KTIV	4.6	February 2023	
Topeka	Kansas	WIBW-TV	13.3	January 1, 2020	
Wichita	Kansas	KWCH-DT	12.4	January 1, 2020	
Bowling Green	Kentucky	WBKO-TV	13.4	December 27, 2022	
Hazard	Kentucky	WYMT-TV	57.3	January 1, 2020	
Lexington	Kentucky	WKYT-TV	27.3	January 1, 2020	
Louisville	Kentucky	WAVE	3.3	January 1, 2020	
Baton Rouge	Louisiana	WAFB	9.3	January 1, 2020	
Lake Charles	Louisiana	KVHP	29.3	January 13, 2020	
Monroe	Louisiana	KNOE-TV	8.4	January 1, 2021	
New Orleans	Louisiana	WVUE-DT	8.3	January 1, 2020	
Shreveport	Louisiana	KSLA	12.2	January 1, 2020	
Bangor	Maine	WABI-TV	5.4	January 1, 2020	
Salisbury	Maryland	WMDE	36.4	January 1, 2020	
Boston	Massachusetts	WSBK-TV	38.5	January 1, 2020	
Detroit	Michigan	WKBD-TV	50.5	January 1, 2020	
Flint	Michigan	WJRT-TV	12.3	January 1, 2020	
Lansing	Michigan	WILX-TV	10.3	January 1, 2020	
Marquette	Michigan	WLUC-TV	6.4		
Duluth	Minnesota	K23MQ-D	23.1	February 2023	
Mankato	Minnesota	KMNF-LD	7.3	October 6, 2022	
Minneapolis	Minnesota	KARE-TV	11.5	February 13, 2020	
Rochester	Minnesota	KTTC	10.6	February 2023	
Biloxi	Mississippi	WLOX	13.6		
Hattiesburg–Laurel	Mississippi	WDAM	7.5		
Jackson	Mississippi	WLBT	3.3	January 1, 2020	
Meridian	Mississippi	WTOK	11.5		
Cape Girardeau	Missouri	KFVS-TV	12.3	January 1, 2020	
Kansas City	Missouri	KQML-LD	46.1	January 7, 2023	
Kansas City	Missouri	KSMO	62.5	January 1, 2020	
St. Louis	Missouri	KMOV	4.5	January 1, 2020	
Springfield	Missouri	KYTV	3.5	January 1, 2020	
Grand Island–Hastings	Nebraska	KGIN	11.5	January 1, 2020	
Lincoln	Nebraska	KOLN	10.5	January 1, 2020	
North Platte	Nebraska	KNOP-TV	2.4	January 2, 2023	
Omaha	Nebraska	WOWT	6.6		
Reno	Nevada	KOLO-TV	8.4	January 1, 2020	
Las Vegas	Nevada	KHSV	21.3	May 2021	
Binghamton	New York	WBNG-TV	12.6	February 2023	
New York City	New York	WCBS-TV	2.5	January 1, 2020	
New York City	New York	WLNY-TV	55.5	January 1, 2020	
Charlotte	North Carolina	WBTV	3.3	January 1, 2020	
Greensboro	North Carolina	WFMY-TV	2.5	February 2020	
Greenville–New Bern	North Carolina	WITN-TV	7.6	January 1, 2020	
Raleigh	North Carolina	WNCN	17.4	September 1, 2021	
Wilmington	North Carolina	WECT	6.3	January 1, 2020	
Bismarck	North Dakota	KFYR-TV	5.4	January 1, 2020	
Dickinson	North Dakota	KQCD-TV	7.4	January 1, 2020	
Minot	North Dakota	KMOT	10.4	January 1, 2020	
Williston	North Dakota	KUMV-TV	8.4	January 1, 2020	
Cincinnati	Ohio	WXIX-TV	19.3	January 1, 2020	
Cleveland	Ohio	WUAB	43.2	January 1, 2020	
Columbus	Ohio	WBNS-TV	10.6	January 1, 2020	
Toledo	Ohio	WTVG	13.4	January 1, 2020	
Tulsa	Oklahoma	KJRH-TV	2.6	May 17, 2022	
Portland	Oregon	KPDX	49.3	June 17, 2022	
Philadelphia	Pennsylvania	WPSG	57.5	January 1, 2020	
Pittsburgh	Pennsylvania	WPKD-TV	19.4	January 1, 2020	
Toa Baja	Puerto Rico	W17DL-D	17.3	February 1, 2020	
Charleston	South Carolina	WCSC-TV	5.3	January 1, 2020	
Columbia	South Carolina	WIS	10.3	January 1, 2020	
Myrtle Beach	South Carolina	WMBF-TV	32.3	January 1, 2020	
Lead	South Dakota	KHSD-TV	11.2	January 1, 2020	
Rapid City	South Dakota	KOTA-TV	3.2	January 1, 2020	
Knoxville	Tennessee	WVLT-TV	8.4	January 1, 2020	
Memphis	Tennessee	WMC-TV	5.3	January 1, 2020	Broadcast CW Sports programming on weekends.
Nashville	Tennessee	WSMV-TV	4.5	January 31, 2020	Flagship station.
Amarillo	Texas	KEYU	31.3	January 1, 2020	
Austin	Texas	KVUE	24.5	Spring 2020	
Fort Worth–Dallas	Texas	KTXA	21.4	January 1, 2020	
Houston	Texas	KHOU	11.5	January 1, 2020	
Lubbock	Texas	KCBD	11.2	January 1, 2020	
San Antonio	Texas	KENS-TV	5.5	January 1, 2020	
Sherman	Texas	KXII	12.6	January 2023	
Tyler	Texas	KLTV	7.2	January 1, 2020	
Waco–Temple	Texas	KNCT	46.2	January 13, 2020	
Wichita Falls	Texas	KAUZ-TV	6.3	January 13, 2020	
Burlington	Vermont	WCAX-TV	3.3	January 1, 2020	
Charlottesville	Virginia	WVIR-TV	29.6	February 2023	
Harrisonburg	Virginia	WHSV-TV	3.6		
Norfolk	Virginia	WTKR	3.5		
Richmond	Virginia	WWBT	12.3	January 1, 2020	
Roanoke	Virginia	WDBJ	7.2	January 1, 2020	
Tacoma–Seattle	Washington	KSTW	11.5	January 1, 2020	
Beckley–Oak Hill	West Virginia	WVVA-TV	6.6		
Huntington–Charleston	West Virginia	WSAZ-TV	3.3	January 1, 2020	
Clarksburg	West Virginia	WDTV	5.4	January 1, 2020	
Eau Claire	Wisconsin	WEAU-TV	13.3	February 2020	
Green Bay	Wisconsin	WBAY-TV	2.3	January 1, 2020	Broadcasts MyNetworkTV programming on weekdays.
Wausau	Wisconsin	WSAW-TV	7.6		
Casper	Wyoming	KCWY-DT	13.5		
