= When We Were Boys =

Studio album by The Bellamy Brothers
- Released: 1982
- Genre: Country
- Length: 36:28
- Label: Elektra/Curb Records
- Producer: The Bellamy Brothers Jimmy Bowen

The Bellamy Brothers chronology
Sons of the Sun (1980)	When We Were Boys (1982)	Strong Weakness (1982)

Singles from When We Were Boys
- 1. "For All the Wrong Reasons" Released: February 1982; 2. "Get into Reggae Cowboy" Released: July 17, 1982

When We Were Boys is the seventh studio album by American country music duo The Bellamy Brothers. It was released in 1982 via Elektra and Curb Records. The album includes the singles "For All the Wrong Reasons" and "Get into Reggae Cowboy".

== Track listing ==
No.	Title	Writer(s)	Length
1.	"For All the Wrong Reasons"	David Bellamy	3:53
2.	"When We Were Boys"	D. Bellamy	4:19
3.	"Get into Reggae Cowboy"	D. Bellamy	3:11
4.	"You Make Love So Easy"	Howard Bellamy	4:39
5.	"Goin' Sane"	D. Bellamy	3:11
6.	"We're Just a Little Ole Country Band"	D. Bellamy	4:01
7.	"This Time"	H. Bellamy	3:57
8.	"Until the Money's Gone"	D. Bellamy	2:25
9.	"We Can Handle It"	H. Bellamy	2:52
10.	"When We All Get to Heaven"	D. Bellamy	4:00

== Personnel ==
Adapted from liner notes.

=== Bellamy Brothers Band ===
- David Bellamy - lead and harmony vocals, acoustic guitar, accordion
- Howard Bellamy - lead and harmony vocals, acoustic guitar
- Randy Ferrell - electric & acoustic guitars, banjo
- Donnie Helms - bass guitar
- Dannie Jones - steel guitar, lap steel guitar, dobro
- Jon LaFrandre - keyboards, background vocals
- Juan Perez - drums, percussion

=== Guest Musicians ===
- Buddy Spicher - fiddle
- John Hummerick - mandolin
- Wally Dentz - harmonica
- The Darby Angels (Ginger Bellamy Clements & Lucille Musser) - background vocals on "When We All Get to Heaven"

== Chart performance ==
Chart (1982)	Peak position
US Top Country Albums (Billboard)	15
