= You're My Favorite Star =

Single by The Bellamy Brothers
- B-side: "It's Hard to Be a Cowboy These Days"
- Released: October 1981
- Genre: Country
- Length: 3:24
- Label: Warner Bros./Curb 49815
- Songwriter(s): David Bellamy
- Producer(s): Michael Lloyd

The Bellamy Brothers singles chronology
"They Could Put Me in Jail" (1981)	"You're My Favorite Star" (1981)	"For All the Wrong Reasons" (1982)

"You're My Favorite Star" is a song recorded by American country music duo The Bellamy Brothers and written by David Bellamy, one-half of the duo. It was released in October 1981 via Warner Bros. Records and Curb Records, reaching number seven on the Hot Country Songs charts. The single and the one before it, "They Could Put Me in Jail", were never included on a studio album, although this song was later added to the duo's 1989 compilation album Greatest Hits Volume III.

Regarding the song, David said that it was "the first one we'd done with steel drums and a reggae feel." He said that this song led the duo to record other reggae-styled songs on later albums, such as "Get into Reggae Cowboy".

== Chart performance ==
Chart (1981)	Peak position
US Hot Country Songs (Billboard)	7
Canadian RPM Country Tracks	16
