= You Can Get Crazy =

Studio album by The Bellamy Brothers
- Released: 1980
- Genre: Country
- Length: 33:36
- Label: Warner Bros./Curb
- Producer: Michael Lloyd

The Bellamy Brothers chronology
The Two and Only (1979)	You Can Get Crazy (1980)	Sons of the Sun (1980)

Singles from You Can Get Crazy
- 1. "Sugar Daddy" Released: January 1980; 2. "Dancin' Cowboys" Released: May 1980

You Can Get Crazy is the fifth studio album by American country music duo The Bellamy Brothers. It was released in 1980 via Warner Bros. Records and Curb Records. The album includes the singles "Sugar Daddy" and "Dancin' Cowboys".

== Track listing ==
All songs written by David Bellamy, except where noted.

You Can Get Crazy track listing
No.	Title	Writer(s)	Length
1.	"Dancin' Cowboys"		3:18
2.	"Sugar Daddy"		3:37
3.	"Foolin' Around"		2:37
4.	"Comin' Back for More"	Howard Bellamy	3:49
5.	"I Could Be Makin' Love to You"		3:30
6.	"Dead Aim"	H. Bellamy	2:44
7.	"You Can Get Crazy with Me"		4:14
8.	"Fast Train Out of Texas"	D. Bellamy, Jim Stafford	3:45
9.	"Naked Lady"	Deborah Allen, Rafe Van Hoy	3:07
10.	"Let Me Waltz into Your Heart"	D. Bellamy, H. Bellamy	2:55

== Musicians ==
Adapted from liner notes.

The Bellamy Brothers and the Dizzy Rambler Band

- David and Howard Bellamy - lead and harmony vocals, acoustic guitar
- Carl Chambers - lead and acoustic guitars
- Jesse Chambers - bass guitar
- Dannie Jones - steel guitar
- Jon LaFrandre - keyboards
- Rodney Price - drums

Guest Musicians

- Carlos Vega - drums
- Alan Eastos - percussion
- Bobby Bruce - fiddle

== Chart performance ==
Chart (1980)	Peak position
US Top Country Albums (Billboard)	9
