= Sons of the Sun =

Studio album by The Bellamy Brothers
- Released: 1980
- Genre: Country
- Length: 34:36
- Label: Warner Bros/Curb
- Producer: Michael Lloyd, The Bellamy Brothers

The Bellamy Brothers chronology
| You Can Get Crazy (1980) | Sons of the Sun (1980) | When We Were Boys (1982) |

Singles from Sons of the Sun
- 1. "Lovers Live Longer" Released: October 11, 1980; 2. "Do You Love as Good as You Look" Released: January 1981

Sons of the Sun is the sixth studio album by American country music duo The Bellamy Brothers. It was released in 1980 via Warner Bros. and Curb Records. The albums includes the singles "Lovers Live Longer" and "Do You Love as Good as You Look".

== Track listing ==
All songs written by David Bellamy, except where noted.

| No. | Title | Writer(s) | Length |
|---|---|---|---|
| 1. | "Lovers Live Longer" | | 3:16 |
| 2. | "Do You Love as Good as You Look" | Jerry Gillespie, Charlie Black, Rory Bourke | 2:57 |
| 3. | "It's Hard to Be a Cowboy These Days" | | 3:41 |
| 4. | "Dancin' Romance" | Howard Bellamy | 3:26 |
| 5. | "Endangered Species" | | 3:12 |
| 6. | "Givin' into Love Again" | H. Bellamy | 4:19 |
| 7. | "Honey, We Don't Know No One in Nashville" | | 2:23 |
| 8. | "Spiders and Snakes" | D. Bellamy, Jim Stafford | 4:02 |
| 9. | "Classic Case of the Blues" | | 4:57 |
| 10. | "Illusions of Love" | H. Bellamy | 3:23 |

== Personnel ==
Adapted from liner notes.

=== Bellamy Brothers & Diamond Back ===
- David and Howard Bellamy - lead and harmony vocals, acoustic guitar
- Jesse Chambers - bass guitar
- Randy Ferrell - lead, acoustic and classical guitars
- Dannie Jones - steel guitar, lap steel guitar, dobro
- Jon LaFrandre - piano, organ, keyboards, background vocals
- Rodney Price - drums

=== Guest Musicians ===
- Ricky Skaggs - fiddle, mandolin
- Bobbye Hall - percussion

== Chart performance ==
| Chart (1980) | Peak position |
|---|---|
| US Top Country Albums (Billboard) | 18 |
