= Jesse and Noah =

Country-rock duo based in Nashville, Tennessee

Jesse & Noah
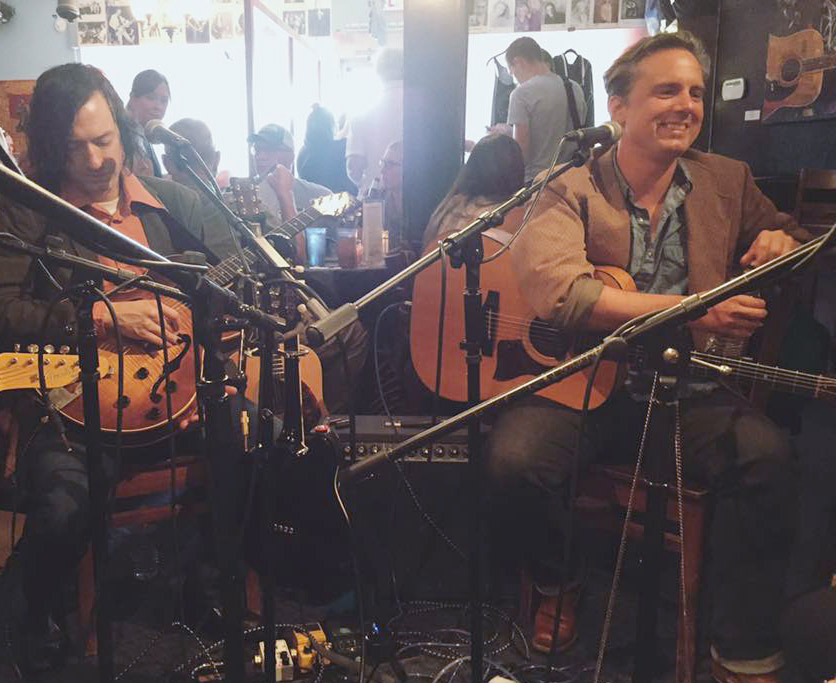
- Jesse & Noah, Bluebird Cafe, Nashville, Tennessee

Background information
- Origin: Nashville, Tennessee
- Genres: Country, rock, Americana
- Years active: 2001–present
- Label: Bellerophon
- Members: Jesse Bellamy; Noah Bellamy
- Website: www.jesseandnoah.com

Jesse & Noah is a Nashville, Tennessee, country-rock duo with roots in central Florida, consisting of brothers Jesse Bellamy and Noah Bellamy. Jesse and Noah were raised in Darby, Florida, on their family's cattle farm and got an early taste of the touring musician's life, going on the road frequently with their father, David Milton Bellamy of the country-pop duo, the Bellamy Brothers.

In 2002, Jesse and Noah moved from Tampa, Florida, to Nashville, Tennessee. Their debut album with Fort Worth-based Smith Music Group titled Nowhere Revisited was released in 2006. Their song, "You're the World", co-written by Jesse Bellamy and David Bellamy, was included on both the Nowhere Revisited album and the Bellamy Brothers' album Jesus Is Coming. The album included a cover of the Tom T. Hall-penned "Faster Horses" and earned them the "Who to Watch in 2007" title by the Country Music Association.

Driven Back was released in August 2012 and featured the song "You Could Have Had it All" with accompanying video on CMT.com

Brethren (Bellerophon Records) came out in May 2015, an EP of cover versions highlighting sibling harmonies in classic country music, including The Everly Brothers song, "All I Have to Do Is Dream".

Southern Usonia (independent release) was self-produced at their home studio in Nashville, Tennessee, and released October 14, 2016. Rolling Stone Country premiered a video for the single, "This Town Was Built on Heartbreak Songs", filmed at the Nashville Palace and featuring footage of honky tonks on Lower Broadway, and celebrity cameos from Tanya Tucker, T. G. Sheppard, Ronnie McDowell, Deborah Allen, and the Bellamy Brothers.

== Discography ==
- Nowhere Revisited (2006)
- Landfall (2010)
- Driven Back (2012)
- Brethren (2015)
- Southern Usonia (2016)
- Neon Pike (2018)
- Leave Love Alone (2024)
- Driving Home for Christmas (2024)
