= Howard & David =

Studio album by The Bellamy Brothers
- Released: 1985
- Studio: Emerald Sound Studios, and Sound Stage Studios Nashville, TN
- Genre: Country
- Length: 33:06
- Label: MCA/Curb
- Producer: Jimmy Bowen, Emory Gordy Jr.

The Bellamy Brothers chronology
Restless (1984)	Howard & David (1985)	Country Rap (1986)

Singles from Howard & David
- 1. "Old Hippie" Released: April 1985; 2. "Lie to You for Your Love" Released: September 14, 1985; 3. "Feelin' the Feelin'" Released: January 1986

Howard & David is the tenth studio album by American country music duo The Bellamy Brothers. It was released in 1985 via MCA and Curb Records. It includes the singles "Old Hippie", "Feelin' the Feelin'" and "Lie to You for Your Love".

== Track listing ==
No.	Title	Writer(s)	Length
1.	"Wheels"	Dave Loggins	3:11
2.	"Season of the Wind"	David Bellany, Howard Bellamy, Frankie Miller	3:31
3.	"The Single Man and His Wife"	D. Bellamy	3:02
4.	"I'm Gonna Hurt Her on the Radio"	Mac McAnally, Tom Brasfield	2:54
5.	"Feelin' the Feelin'"	D. Bellamy	3:40
6.	"You're My Favorite Waste of Time"	Marshall Crenshaw	3:48
7.	"Lie to You for Your Love"	D. Bellamy, H. Bellamy, Frankie Miller, Jeff Barry	3:21
8.	"Old Hippie"	D. Bellamy	4:02
9.	"Everybody's Somebody's Darlin'"	Dickey Lee, Bob McDill	3:27
10.	"Jeannie Rae"	Bob DiPiero, John Scott Sherrill, Tim Krekel	2:00

== Personnel ==
Adapted from liner notes.

=== The Bellamy Brothers ===
- David Bellamy - lead & harmony vocals
- Howard Bellamy - lead & harmony vocals

=== Musicians ===
- Richard Bennett - guitar, guitar solos on "Wheels" & "I'm Gonna Hurt Her on the Radio"
- Matt Betton - drums
- Sonny Garrish - steel guitar
- Emory Gordy Jr. - bass guitar
- John Barlow Jarvis - keyboards
- Nicolette Larson - background vocals on "Everybody's Somebody's Darlin'"
- Charlie McCoy - harmonica on "Old Hippie"
- Billy Joe Walker Jr. - guitar, all guitar solos except "Wheels" & "I'm Gonna Hurt Her on the Radio"
- Reggie Young - guitar

== Chart performance ==
Chart (1985)	Peak position
US Top Country Albums (Billboard)	10
