= Rebel Without a Clue =

Rebel Without a Clue may refer to:

== Music ==
- "Rebel Without a Clue" (Bonnie Tyler song), a song by Bonnie Tyler from the 1986 album Secret Dreams and Forbidden Fire
- "a rebel without a clue", a lyric from the 1989 single "I'll Be You" by The Replacements
- "a rebel without a clue", a lyric from the 1991 single "Into the Great Wide Open" by Tom Petty and the Heartbreakers
- "a rebel without a clue", a lyric from the 2020 song "Graceland Too" by Phoebe Bridgers

== TV ==
- "Rebel Without a Clue" (Quantum Leap), a 1990 episode
- "Lum: Rebel Without a Clue", a.k.a. "Lum-chan the Ruthless Rebel" (Japanese: ラムちゃんの理由なき反抗), episode 72 (season 2, episode 18) of the 1981 animated Japanese series Urusei Yatsura

== See also ==
- Rebels Without a Clue (disambiguation)
