= Reality Check (The Bellamy Brothers album) =

Studio album by The Bellamy Brothers
- Released: May 29, 1990
- Recorded: 1989–90
- Genre: Country
- Length: 32:38
- Label: MCA/Curb
- Producer: Emory Gordy Jr.

The Bellamy Brothers chronology
Greatest Hits Volume III (1989)	Reality Check (1990)	Rollin' Thunder (1991)

Singles from Reality Check
- 1. "I Could Be Persuaded" Released: June 30, 1990

Reality Check is the fourteenth studio album by American country music group The Bellamy Brothers. It was released in 1990 via MCA and Curb Records. The album includes the single "I Could Be Persuaded".

== Track listing ==
No.	Title	Writer(s)	Length
1.	"Too Late"	David Bellamy, Howard Bellamy, Kostas	2:54
2.	"I Could Be Persuaded"	D. Bellamy, H. Bellamy, Don Schlitz	3:20
3.	"Have a Little Compassion"	D. Bellamy	2:51
4.	"Was There Life Before This Love"	D. Bellamy	3:27
5.	"Makin' Promises"	D. Bellamy, Schlitz	3:38
6.	"What's This World Coming To"	D. Bellamy	3:40
7.	"Forever Ain't Long Enough"	D. Bellamy	3:27
8.	"How Can You Be Anywhere at the Same Time"	D. Bellamy, H. Bellamy, Schlitz	3:18
9.	"I Don't Wanna Lose You"	D. Bellamy, H. Bellamy, Schlitz	3:07
10.	"Reality Check"	D. Bellamy, Schlitz	2:56

== Personnel ==
Adapted from liner notes.

=== The Bellamy Brothers ===
- David Bellamy - vocals
- Howard Bellamy - vocals

=== Musicians ===
- Ed Enoch - background vocals
- Paul Franklin - steel guitar
- Vince Gill - background vocals
- Emory Gordy Jr. - bass guitar, 6-string bass guitar
- Jim Horn - saxophone
- John Barlow Jarvis - keyboards
- Tony King - background vocals
- Mike Lawler - keyboards
- Larrie Londin - drums
- Jeff Ross - electric guitar
- Larry Strickland - background vocals
- Chuck Ward - keyboards
- Biff Watson - acoustic guitar, electric guitar
- Woody Wright - background vocals
- Reggie Young - electric guitar

== Chart performance ==
Chart (1990)	Peak position
US Top Country Albums (Billboard)	71
