= Dancin' Cowboys =

Single by The Bellamy Brothers

from the album You Can Get Crazy
- B-side: "Dead Aim"
- Released: May 1980
- Genre: Country
- Length: 3:21
- Label: Warner Bros./Curb
- Songwriter: David Bellamy
- Producer: Michael Lloyd

The Bellamy Brothers singles chronology
"Sugar Daddy" (1980)	"Dancin' Cowboys" (1980)	"Lovers Live Longer" (1980)

"Dancin' Cowboys" is a song written by David Bellamy, and recorded by American country music duo the Bellamy Brothers. It was released in May 1980 as the second single from the album You Can Get Crazy. The song was The Bellamy Brothers third number one on the country chart. The single stayed at number one for one week and spent a total of fourteen weeks on the country chart.

== Reception ==
Record Mirror chose this as their Worst Single of the Week, calling it "appalling nonsense. If John Wayne wasn't already dead, this would do the trick. This concerns the exploits of two fashion conscious cowboys. 'We love boots and saddles' warble the undynamic duo."

== Chart performance ==
Chart (1980)	Peak position
US Hot Country Songs (Billboard)	1
Canadian RPM Country Tracks	4

=== Year-end charts ===
Chart (1980)	Position
US Country Songs (Billboard)	4
