= Feelin' the Feelin' =

Single by The Bellamy Brothers

from the album Howard & David
- B-side: "The Single Man and His Wife"
- Released: January 1986
- Recorded: c. February 1985
- Genre: Country pop, country rock
- Length: 3:43
- Label: MCA/Curb 52747
- Songwriter(s): David Bellamy
- Producer(s): Emory Gordy Jr., Jimmy Bowen

The Bellamy Brothers singles chronology
"Lie to You for Your Love" (1985)	"Feelin' the Feelin'" (1986)	"Too Much Is Not Enough" (1986)

"Feelin' the Feelin'" is a song written by David Bellamy, and recorded by American country music duo The Bellamy Brothers. It was released in January 1986 as the third single from the album Howard & David. The song reached No. 2 on the Billboard Hot Country Singles chart.

== Chart performance ==
Chart (1986)	Peak position
US Hot Country Songs (Billboard)	2
Canadian RPM Country Tracks	8
