= Lovers Live Longer =

Single by The Bellamy Brothers

from the album Sons of the Sun
- B-side: "Classic Case of the Blues"
- Released: October 11, 1980
- Genre: Country
- Length: 3:19
- Label: Warner Bros./Curb
- Songwriter(s): David Bellamy
- Producer(s): Michael Lloyd, The Bellamy Brothers

The Bellamy Brothers singles chronology
"Dancin' Cowboys" (1980)	"Lovers Live Longer" (1980)	"Do You Love as Good as You Look" (1981)

"Lovers Live Longer" is a song written by David Bellamy, and recorded by American country music duo The Bellamy Brothers. It was released in October 1980 as the first single from the album Sons of the Sun. The song reached No. 3 on the Billboard Hot Country Singles & Tracks chart.

== Chart performance ==
Chart (1980)	Peak position
US Hot Country Songs (Billboard)	3
Canadian RPM Country Tracks	30
