= Warner Curb Records =

Warner Curb Records was a joint venture between Warner Bros. Records and producer Mike Curb to release his productions. The label was active between 1972 and 1983. In 1983, it folded into Curb Records.

== See also ==
- List of record labels
