= Too Much Is Not Enough =

Single by The Bellamy Brothers with The Forester Sisters

from the album Country Rap
- B-side: "Restless"
- Released: September 1986
- Genre: Country, pop rock
- Length: 3:50
- Label: MCA/Curb
- Songwriters: David Bellamy; Ron Taylor
- Producer: Emory Gordy Jr.

The Bellamy Brothers singles chronology
"Feelin' the Feelin'" (1986)	"Too Much Is Not Enough" (1986)	"Kids of the Baby Boom" (1987)

The Forester Sisters singles chronology
"Lonely Alone" (1986)	"Too Much Is Not Enough" (1986)	"Too Many Rivers" (1987)

"Too Much is Not Enough" is a song written by David Bellamy and Ron Taylor, and recorded by American country music duo The Bellamy Brothers as a collaboration with The Forester Sisters. It was released in September 1986 as the first single from The Bellamy Brothers' album Country Rap. The song was the ninth number one on the country chart for The Bellamy Brothers. The single went to number one for one week and spent a total of fifteen weeks within the top 40.

== Charts ==
=== Weekly charts ===
Chart (1986–1987)	Peak position
US Hot Country Songs (Billboard)	1
Canadian RPM Country Tracks	1

=== Year-end charts ===
Chart (1987)	Position
US Hot Country Songs (Billboard)	28
