= Get into Reggae Cowboy =

Single by The Bellamy Brothers

from the album When We Were Boys
- B-side: "We're Just a Little Ole Country Band"
- Released: July 17, 1982
- Genre: Country
- Length: 3:13
- Label: Elektra/Curb
- Songwriter(s): David Bellamy
- Producer(s): Michael Lloyd

The Bellamy Brothers singles chronology
| "For All the Wrong Reasons" (1982) | "Get into Reggae Cowboy" (1982) | "Redneck Girl" (1982) |

"Get into Reggae Cowboy" is a song written by David Bellamy, and recorded by American country music duo The Bellamy Brothers. It was released in July 1982 as the second single from the album When We Were Boys. The song reached number 21 on the Billboard Hot Country Singles & Tracks chart.

== Chart performance ==
| Chart (1982) | Peak position |
|---|---|
| US Hot Country Songs (Billboard) | 21 |
| Canadian RPM Country Tracks | 9 |
