= You Ain't Just Whistlin' Dixie =

Single by The Bellamy Brothers

from the album The Two and Only
- B-side: "Blue Ribbons"
- Released: August 18, 1979
- Genre: Country
- Length: 4:24
- Label: Warner Bros./Curb
- Songwriter(s): David Bellamy
- Producer(s): Michael Lloyd

The Bellamy Brothers singles chronology
"If I Said You Have a Beautiful Body Would You Hold It Against Me" (1979)	"You Ain't Just Whistlin' Dixie" (1979)	"Sugar Daddy" (1980)

"You Ain't Just Whistlin' Dixie" is a song written by David Bellamy and recorded by American country music duo The Bellamy Brothers. It was released in August 1979 as the third single from the album The Two and Only. The song reached number 5 on the Billboard Hot Country Singles & Tracks chart.

In 2005, the Bellamy Brothers re-recorded the song with Alan Jackson for their album Angels & Outlaws, Vol. 1.

== Chart performance ==
Chart (1979)	Peak position
US Hot Country Songs (Billboard)	5
Canadian RPM Country Tracks	11
