= For All the Wrong Reasons =

Single by The Bellamy Brothers

from the album When We Were Boys
- B-side: "This Time"
- Released: February 1982
- Genre: Country
- Length: 3:54
- Label: Elektra/Curb
- Songwriter(s): David Bellamy
- Producer(s): Jimmy Bowen, The Bellamy Brothers

The Bellamy Brothers singles chronology
"You're My Favorite Star" (1981)	"For All the Wrong Reasons" (1982)	"Get into Reggae Cowboy" (1982)

"For All the Wrong Reasons" is a song written by David Bellamy, and recorded by American country music duo The Bellamy Brothers. It was released in February 1982 as the first single from the album When We Were Boys. The song was The Bellamy Brothers fifth number one on the country chart. The single went to number one for one week and spent a total of twelve weeks on the country chart.

== Charts ==
=== Weekly charts ===
Chart (1982)	Peak position
US Hot Country Songs (Billboard)	1
Canadian RPM Country Tracks	20

=== Year-end charts ===
Chart (1982)	Position
US Hot Country Songs (Billboard)	25
