= Forget About Me =

Single by The Bellamy Brothers

from the album Restless
- B-side: "We're Having Some Fun Now"
- Released: June 2, 1984
- Genre: Country, country pop, pop rock
- Length: 3:36
- Label: MCA/Curb
- Songwriter(s): Frankie Miller, Troy Seals, Eddie Setser
- Producer(s): The Bellamy Brothers, Steve Klein

The Bellamy Brothers singles chronology
"Strong Weakness" (1983)	"Forget About Me" (1984)	"World's Greatest Lover" (1984)

"Forget About Me" is a song written by Frankie Miller, Troy Seals and Eddie Setser, and recorded by American country music duo The Bellamy Brothers. It was released in June 1984 as the first single from the album Restless. The song reached number 5 on the Billboard Hot Country Singles & Tracks chart.

== Chart performance ==
Chart (1984)	Peak position
US Hot Country Songs (Billboard)	5
Canadian RPM Country Tracks	13
