= I Love Her Mind =

Single by The Bellamy Brothers

from the album Strong Weakness
- B-side: "Lazy Eyes"
- Released: May 21, 1983
- Genre: Country
- Length: 3:15
- Label: Elektra/Curb
- Songwriter(s): David Bellamy
- Producer(s): Jimmy Bowen, The Bellamy Brothers

The Bellamy Brothers singles chronology
"When I'm Away from You" (1983)	"I Love Her Mind" (1983)	"Strong Weakness" (1983)

"I Love Her Mind" is a song written by David Bellamy, and recorded by American country music duo The Bellamy Brothers. It was released in May 1983 as the third single from the album Strong Weakness. The song reached number 4 on the Billboard Hot Country Singles & Tracks chart.

== Chart performance ==
Chart (1983)	Peak position
US Hot Country Songs (Billboard)	4
Canadian RPM Country Tracks	3
