= I'll Give You All My Love Tonight =

Single by The Bellamy Brothers

from the album Crazy from the Heart
- B-side: "Ying Yang"
- Released: May 7, 1988
- Genre: Country, pop rock
- Length: 4:05
- Label: MCA/Curb
- Songwriter(s): David Bellamy, Billy Crain, Wally Dentz
- Producer(s): Emory Gordy Jr.

The Bellamy Brothers singles chronology
"Santa Fe" (1988)	"I'll Give You All My Love Tonight" (1988)	"Rebels Without a Clue" (1988)

"I'll Give You All My Love Tonight" is a song written by David Bellamy, Billy Crain and Wally Dentz, and recorded by American country music duo The Bellamy Brothers. It was released in May 1988 as the third single from the album Crazy from the Heart. The song reached number 6 on the Billboard Hot Country Singles & Tracks chart.

== Charts ==
=== Weekly charts ===
Chart (1988)	Peak position
US Hot Country Songs (Billboard)	6
Canadian RPM Country Tracks	12

=== Year-end charts ===
Chart (1988)	Position
US Hot Country Songs (Billboard)	71
