= Crazy from the Heart =

Single by The Bellamy Brothers

from the album Crazy from the Heart
- B-side: "White Trash"
- Released: August 15, 1987
- Genre: Country, country pop
- Length: 3:36
- Label: MCA/Curb
- Songwriter(s): David Bellamy, Don Schlitz
- Producer(s): Emory Gordy Jr.

The Bellamy Brothers singles chronology
"Country Rap" (1987)	"Crazy from the Heart" (1987)	"Santa Fe" (1988)

"Crazy from the Heart" is a song written by David Bellamy and Don Schlitz, and recorded by American country music duo The Bellamy Brothers. It was released in August 1987 as the first single and title track from the album Crazy from the Heart. The song reached number 3 on the Billboard Hot Country Singles & Tracks chart. The song was released as a duet with Chris Hillman on the Angels and Outlaws album in 2005.

== Chart performance ==
Chart (1987)	Peak position
US Hot Country Songs (Billboard)	3
Canadian RPM Country Tracks	7
