= Big Love (The Bellamy Brothers song) =

Single by The Bellamy Brothers

from the album Rebels Without a Clue
- B-side: "The Courthouse"
- Released: January 7, 1989
- Genre: Country
- Length: 3:22
- Label: MCA/Curb
- Songwriter(s): David Bellamy
- Producer(s): Jimmy Bowen, James Stroud

The Bellamy Brothers singles chronology
| "Rebels Without a Clue" (1988) | "Big Love" (1989) | "Hillbilly Hell" (1989) |

"Big Love" is a song written by David Bellamy, and recorded by American country music duo The Bellamy Brothers. It was released in January 1989 as the second single from the album Rebels Without a Clue. The song reached number 5 on the Billboard Hot Country Singles & Tracks chart.

== Chart performance ==
| Chart (1989) | Peak position |
|---|---|
| US Hot Country Songs (Billboard) | 5 |
