= Strong Weakness (album) =

Studio album by The Bellamy Brothers
- Released: 1982
- Genre: Country
- Length: 37:31
- Label: Elektra/Curb
- Producer: Jimmy Bowen, The Bellamy Brothers

The Bellamy Brothers chronology
When We Were Boys (1982)	Strong Weakness (1982)	Greatest Hits (1982)

Singles from Strong Weakness
- 1. "Redneck Girl" Released: September 1982; 2. "When I'm Away from You" Released: January 17, 1983; 3. "I Love Her Mind" Released: May 21, 1983; 4. "Strong Weakness" Released: September 10, 1983

Strong Weakness is the eighth studio album by American country music duo The Bellamy Brothers. It was released in 1982 via Elektra and Curb Records. The album includes the singles "Redneck Girl", "When I'm Away from You", "I Love Her Mind" and "Strong Weakness".

== Track listing ==
No.	Title	Writer(s)	Length
1.	"Strong Weakness"	David Bellamy	3:29
2.	"Doin' It the Hard Way"	D. Bellamy	3:49
3.	"When I'm Away from You"	Frankie Miller	3:50
4.	"I Love Her Mind"	D. Bellamy	3:15
5.	"Almost Jamaica"	D. Bellamy	4:13
6.	"Lazy Eyes"	Howard Bellamy	3:52
7.	"Number Two"	Randy Ferrell	3:47
8.	"The Night They Killed Country Music"	D. Bellamy	4:04
9.	"Long Distance Love Affair"	H. Bellamy	3:57
10.	"Redneck Girl"	D. Bellamy	3:25

== Personnel ==
Adapted from liner notes.

=== Bellamy Brothers Band ===
- David Bellamy - lead and harmony vocals, acoustic guitar, electric piano on "Lazy Eyes"
- Howard Bellamy - lead and harmony vocals, acoustic guitar
- Randy Ferrell - electric & acoustic guitars
- Donnie Helms - bass guitar
- Dannie Jones - steel guitar, lap slide guitar, dobro
- Jon LaFrandre - keyboards, background vocals
- Juan "The Breeze" Perez - drums, percussion

=== Guest Musicians ===
- Buddy Spicher - fiddle
- Wally Dentz - harmonica
- Dewey Dorough - saxophone
- Rick Pupello - rhythm guitar
- Lea Jane Berinati & Yvonne Hodges - background vocals

== Chart performance ==
Chart (1982)	Peak position
US Top Country Albums (Billboard)	17
