= Santa Fe (The Bellamy Brothers song) =

Single by The Bellamy Brothers

from the album Crazy from the Heart
- B-side: "White Trash"
- Released: January 9, 1988
- Genre: Country
- Length: 3:44
- Label: MCA/Curb
- Songwriter(s): David Bellamy, Ron Taylor
- Producer(s): Emory Gordy Jr.

The Bellamy Brothers singles chronology
| "Crazy from the Heart" (1987) | "Santa Fe" (1988) | "I'll Give You All My Love Tonight" (1988) |

"Santa Fe" is a song written by David Bellamy and Ron Taylor, and recorded by American country music duo The Bellamy Brothers. It was released in January 1988 as the second single from the album Crazy from the Heart. The song reached number 5 on the Billboard Hot Country Singles & Tracks chart.

== Charts ==
=== Weekly charts ===
| Chart (1988) | Peak position |
|---|---|
| US Hot Country Songs (Billboard) | 5 |
| Canadian RPM Country Tracks | 2 |

=== Year-end charts ===
| Chart (1988) | Position |
|---|---|
| Canadian RPM Country Tracks | 8 |
| US Hot Country Songs (Billboard) | 77 |
