= Do You Love as Good as You Look =

Single by The Bellamy Brothers

from the album Sons of the Sun
- B-side: "Givin' Into Lovin' Again"
- Released: January 1981
- Genre: Country, country pop, country rock
- Length: 3:00
- Label: Warner Bros./Curb
- Songwriter(s): Jerry Gillespie; Charlie Black; Rory Bourke
- Producer(s): Michael Lloyd

The Bellamy Brothers singles chronology
"Lovers Live Longer" (1980)	"Do You Love as Good as You Look" (1981)	"They Could Put Me in Jail" (1981)

"Do You Love as Good as You Look" is a song written by Jerry Gillespie, Charlie Black and Rory Bourke, and recorded by American country music duo The Bellamy Brothers. It was released in January 1981 as the second single from the album Sons of the Sun. The song was The Bellamy Brothers fourth number one single on the country charts. The single stayed at number one for one week and spent a total of nine weeks on the country chart.

== Chart performance ==
Chart (1981)	Peak position
US Hot Country Songs (Billboard)	1
Canadian RPM Country Tracks	4
