= Jack Smalley =

Jack Smalley was an American composer, orchestrator, and teacher of film and television scoring. After working for years as a jazz bassist, Smalley began to get jobs writing music for television, notably Charlie's Angels and Murder, She Wrote.

In the 1980s, he built a reputation as a teacher at the Grove School of Music and later the University of Southern California. He was also an instructor for the Henry Mancini Institute. Hundreds of composers working in film scoring today have studied with him over the years.

He also worked as an orchestrator on television series (including HBO series Game of Thrones), feature films, and has written a book on film scoring.
