= Sugar Daddy (The Bellamy Brothers song) =

Single by The Bellamy Brothers

from the album You Can Get Crazy
- B-side: "I Could Be Makin' Love to You"
- Released: January 1980
- Genre: Country, country pop
- Length: 3:41
- Label: Warner Bros./Curb
- Songwriter(s): David Bellamy
- Producer(s): Michael Lloyd

The Bellamy Brothers singles chronology
"You Ain't Just Whistlin' Dixie" (1979)	"Sugar Daddy" (1980)	"Dancin' Cowboys" (1980)

"Sugar Daddy" is a song written by David Bellamy, and recorded by American country music duo The Bellamy Brothers. It was released in January 1980 as the first single from the album You Can Get Crazy. The song was the second of ten number one singles on the country chart for The Bellamy Brothers. The single stayed at number one for a single week and spent a total of eleven weeks on the country chart.

== Chart performance ==
Chart (1980)	Peak position
US Hot Country Songs (Billboard)	1
Canadian RPM Country Tracks	2
