= Gölä =

Swiss musician (born 1968)

Listen to this article (3 minutes)
This audio file was created from a revision of this article dated 09 Sep 2025, and does not reflect subsequent edits.

Marco Pfeuti (born 7 June 1968 in Oberdiessbach), better known by his stage name Gölä, is a popular Swiss rock musician performing mainly in Bernese German, but also in English. He grew up in Oppligen near Thun.

== Career ==
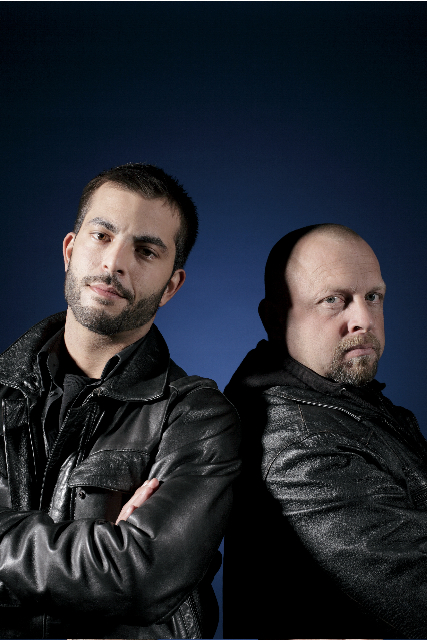
Portrait of Bligg (L) and Gölä (R) before their disbandment

The debut album of Gölä's eponymous band Uf u dervo (1998; meaning "up and leave") sold 250,000 copies, acquiring quintuple platinum status as one of Switzerland's most successful Swiss German music albums. Up until their disbandment in 2002, Gölä and his band produced four more albums, selling over half a million CDs and playing to sold-out concert halls.

A 2004 relaunch of the band as Burn with English-language songs was less successful.

== Discography ==
- Uf u dervo (1998)
- Wildi Ross (1999)
- Volksmusig (2 CD, 2000)
- Gölä III (2001)
- Gölä III – Live02 (2002)
- Burn (2004)
- Gimme a Band (2005)
- Rock & Roll (2007)
- Tättoo – Best of Bärndütsch / So Damn Sexy (2 CD, 2008)
- Z'Läbe fägt (2008)
- Z'Läbe fägt – Platinum Tour Edition 09 (2 CD, 2009)
- The Greatest Hits Sessions (feat. The Bellamy Brothers, 2010)
- BB&G Platinum (The Bellamy Brothers feat. Gölä, 2011)
- 100% Mundart Stadion Thun (CD + DVD, 2011)
- Ängu u Dämone 1 / 2 (2 CD, 2012)
- Die schönsten Mundart-Balladen – Nashville-Aufnahmen (2014)
- Mermaid Cowgirl (The Bellamy Brothers feat. Gölä, 2014)
- Stärne (2016)
- Urchig (2017)
- 20 Jahre Bühnenjubiläum – Hallenstadion 2018 (2 CD + DVD 2018)
- Büetzer Buebe (feat. Trauffer, 2019)
- Hour of the Thief (Gölä & the Deed, 2020)
- Handwärch (feat. Trauffer, 2021)
- U.F.O. (2023)
