= The Center of My Universe =

Single by The Bellamy Brothers

from the album Greatest Hits Volume III
- B-side: "Hillbilly Hell"
- Released: November 11, 1989
- Genre: Country
- Length: 3:24
- Label: MCA/Curb
- Songwriter(s): David Bellamy, Howard Bellamy, Don Schlitz
- Producer(s): Tony Brown

The Bellamy Brothers singles chronology
"Hillbilly Hell" (1989)	"The Center of My Universe" (1989)	"Drive South" (1990)

"The Center of My Universe" is a song co-written and recorded by American country music duo The Bellamy Brothers. It was released in November 1989 as the third single from their Greatest Hits Volume III compilation album. The song reached #37 on the Billboard Hot Country Singles & Tracks chart. The song was written by David Bellamy, Howard Bellamy and Don Schlitz.

== Chart performance ==
Chart (1989)	Peak position
US Hot Country Songs (Billboard)	37
Canadian RPM Country Tracks	43
