= I Need More of You =

Single by The Bellamy Brothers

from the album Restless
- B-side: "Diesel Cafe"
- Released: January 1985
- Genre: Country, country pop
- Length: 3:28
- Label: MCA/Curb
- Songwriter(s): David Bellamy
- Producer(s): The Bellamy Brothers, Steve Klein

The Bellamy Brothers singles chronology
"World's Greatest Lover" (1984)	"I Need More of You" (1985)	"Old Hippie" (1985)

"I Need More of You" is a song written by David Bellamy, and recorded by American country music duo The Bellamy Brothers. It was released in January 1985 as the third single from the album Restless. The song was The Bellamy Brothers eighth number one country hit. The single went to number one for one week and spent a total of fourteen weeks on the country chart.

== Charts ==
=== Weekly charts ===
Chart (1985)	Peak position
US Hot Country Songs (Billboard)	1
Canadian RPM Country Tracks	4

=== Year-end charts ===
Chart (1985)	Position
US Hot Country Songs (Billboard)	25
