= When I'm Away from You =

Single by The Bellamy Brothers

from the album Strong Weakness
- B-side: "Long Distance Love Affair"
- Released: January 17, 1983
- Genre: Country
- Length: 3:52
- Label: Elektra/Curb
- Songwriter(s): Frankie Miller
- Producer(s): Jimmy Bowen, The Bellamy Brothers

The Bellamy Brothers singles chronology
"Redneck Girl" (1982)	"When I'm Away from You" (1983)	"I Love Her Mind" (1983)

"When I'm Away from You" is a song written and originally recorded by Frankie Miller in 1979. It was also recorded by Kim Carnes and included on her 1981 album Mistaken Identity. The best-known version of the song was recorded by American country music duo The Bellamy Brothers. It was released in January 1983 as the second single from the album Strong Weakness. The song was The Bellamy Brothers' seventh number one on the country chart. The single stayed at number one for one week and spent twelve weeks on the country chart.

== Charts ==
=== Weekly charts ===
Chart (1983)	Peak position
US Hot Country Songs (Billboard)	1
Canadian RPM Country Tracks	5

=== Year-end charts ===
Chart (1983)	Position
US Hot Country Songs (Billboard)	26
