= Rebels Without a Clue (album) =

Studio album by The Bellamy Brothers
- Released: September 19, 1988
- Genre: Country
- Length: 35:00
- Label: MCA/Curb
- Producer: James Stroud, Jimmy Bowen

The Bellamy Brothers chronology
Crazy from the Heart (1987)	Rebels Without a Clue (1988)	Greatest Hits Volume III (1989)

Singles from Rebels Without a Clue
- 1. "Rebels Without a Clue" Released: September 3, 1988; 2. "Big Love" Released: January 7, 1989

Rebels Without a Clue is the thirteenth studio album by American country music duo The Bellamy Brothers. It was released on September 19, 1988, via MCA and Curb Records. The album includes the singles "Rebels Without a Clue" and "Big Love".

== Track listing ==
No.	Title	Writer(s)	Length
1.	"Rebels Without a Clue"	David Bellamy	3:18
2.	"I'll Help You Hurt Him"	D. Bellamy	3:10
3.	"The Fountain of Middle Age"	D. Bellamy	4:37
4.	"Stayin' in Love"	D. Bellamy, Don Schlitz	3:15
5.	"Get Your Priorities in Line"	D. Bellamy, Howard Bellamy, Schlitz	3:10
6.	"Big Love"	D. Bellamy	3:21
7.	"When the Music Meant Everything"	D. Bellamy	3:21
8.	"The Courthouse"	D. Bellamy, Schlitz	4:26
9.	"The Andy Griffith Show"	D. Bellamy	3:10
10.	"A Little Naive"	D. Bellamy, H. Bellamy	3:12

== Personnel ==
Adapted from liner notes.

=== The Bellamy Brothers ===
- David Bellamy - lead & harmony vocals
- Howard Bellamy - lead & harmony vocals

=== Musicians ===
- Pat Flynn - acoustic guitar, mandolin
- Lisa Germano - fiddle
- John Barlow Jarvis - piano, keyboards
- Rick Marotta - drums
- Leland Sklar - bass guitar
- Ron Taylor - B-3 organ
- Wally Waldimare - harmonica
- Billy Joe Walker Jr. - acoustic guitar, electric guitar
- Reggie Young - electric guitar

== Chart performance ==
Chart (1988)	Peak position
US Top Country Albums (Billboard)	45
