= Strong Weakness (song) =

Single by The Bellamy Brothers

from the album Strong Weakness
- B-side: "Doin' It the Hard Way"
- Released: September 10, 1983
- Genre: Country
- Length: 3:28
- Label: Warner Bros./Curb
- Songwriter(s): David Bellamy
- Producer(s): Jimmy Bowen, The Bellamy Brothers

The Bellamy Brothers singles chronology
"I Love Her Mind" (1983)	"Strong Weakness" (1983)	"Forget About Me" (1984)

"Strong Weakness" is a song written by David Bellamy, and recorded by American country music duo The Bellamy Brothers. It was released in September 1983 as the fourth single and title track from the album Strong Weakness. The song reached number 15 on the Billboard Hot Country Singles & Tracks chart.

== Chart performance ==
Chart (1983)	Peak position
US Hot Country Songs (Billboard)	15
Canadian RPM Country Tracks	15
