= Rebels Without a Clue (song) =

Single by The Bellamy Brothers

from the album Rebels Without a Clue
- B-side: "A Little Naive"
- Released: September 3, 1988
- Genre: Country
- Length: 3:18
- Label: MCA/Curb
- Songwriter(s): David Bellamy
- Producer(s): Jimmy Bowen, James Stroud

The Bellamy Brothers singles chronology
"I'll Give You All My Love Tonight" (1988)	"Rebels Without a Clue" (1988)	"Big Love" (1989)

"Rebels Without a Clue" is a song written by David Bellamy, and recorded by American country music duo The Bellamy Brothers. It was released in September 1988 as the first single and title track from the album Rebels Without a Clue. The song reached number 9 on the Billboard Hot Country Singles & Tracks chart.

== Chart performance ==
Chart (1988)	Peak position
US Hot Country Songs (Billboard)	9
Canadian RPM Country Tracks	19
