= Lie to You for Your Love =

Single by The Bellamy Brothers

from the album Howard & David
- B-side: "Season of the Wind"
- Released: September 14, 1985
- Genre: Country
- Length: 3:28
- Label: MCA/Curb
- Songwriters: David Bellamy; Howard Bellamy; Frankie Miller; Jeff Barry
- Producers: Emory Gordy Jr., Jimmy Bowen

The Bellamy Brothers singles chronology
"Old Hippie" (1985)	"Lie to You for Your Love" (1985)	"Feelin' the Feelin'" (1986)

"Lie to You for Love", sometimes titled "I'd Lie to You for Your Love", is a song written by Frankie Miller and Jeff Barry that was originally recorded in 1985 by Danny Spanos but became a bigger hit later the same year for the American country music duo The Bellamy Brothers, who earned co-writing credits for their lyrical additions to the track. The Bellamy Brothers' version was released in September 1985 as the second single from the album Howard & David. The song reached number 2 on the Billboard Hot Country Singles & Tracks chart.

== History ==
Danny Spanos' version became a minor hit on the Mainstream Rock charts, peaking at number 42.

The Bellamy Brothers version featured additional verses written by duo members David and Howard Bellamy. After the success of the Bellamy Brothers version, Miller recorded a cover of their rendition on his 1985 album Dancing in the Rain.

In late 2023, the Bellamy Brothers released a version of the song they had recorded with K.T. Oslin prior to her death in 2020.

== Chart performance ==
=== Danny Spanos version ===
Chart (1985)	Peak position
US Top Rock Tracks (Billboard)	42

=== The Bellamy Brothers version ===
Chart (1985)	Peak position
US Hot Country Songs (Billboard)	2
Canadian RPM Country Tracks	3
