= World's Greatest Lover (The Bellamy Brothers song) =

Single by The Bellamy Brothers

from the album Restless
- B-side: "Rock-a-Billy"
- Released: September 22, 1984
- Genre: Country
- Length: 4:23
- Label: MCA/Curb
- Songwriter(s): David Bellamy
- Producer(s): The Bellamy Brothers, Steve Klein

The Bellamy Brothers singles chronology
"Forget About Me" (1984)	"World's Greatest Lover" (1984)	"I Need More of You" (1985)

"World's Greatest Lover" is a song written by David Bellamy, and recorded by American country music duo The Bellamy Brothers. It was released in September 1984 as the second single from the album Restless. The song reached number 6 on the Billboard Hot Country Singles & Tracks chart.

== Chart performance ==
Chart (1984)	Peak position
US Hot Country Songs (Billboard)	6
Canadian RPM Country Tracks	45
