= If I Said You Have a Beautiful Body Would You Hold It Against Me =

1979 single by The Bellamy Brothers

- 1979 single cover

Single by The Bellamy Brothers

from the album The Two and Only
- B-side: "Make Me Over"
- Released: March 1979
- Recorded: 1978
- Genre: Country; soft rock
- Length: 3:14
- Label: Warner Bros./Curb; 8790
- Songwriter: David Bellamy
- Producer: Michael Lloyd

The Bellamy Brothers singles chronology
"Lovin' On" (1978)	"If I Said You Have a Beautiful Body Would You Hold It Against Me" (1979)	"You Ain't Just Whistlin' Dixie" (1979)

"If I Said You Have a Beautiful Body Would You Hold It Against Me" is a song written by David Bellamy, and recorded by American country music duo the Bellamy Brothers. It was released in March 1979 as the second single from the album The Two and Only. The song became their first number 1 hit on the Billboard magazine Hot Country Singles chart and their second number one overall, after their 1976 pop hit "Let Your Love Flow". The title as shown on the original single was "If I Said You Have a Beautiful Body Would You Hold It Against Me", but on the album and subsequent releases, the title is shown as "... Had ...".

== Background ==
"If I Said You Had a Beautiful Body ..." derived its double entendre title from a Groucho Marx line. Songwriter David Bellamy told country music journalist Tom Roland that he regularly watched Marx's program, You Bet Your Life, on which Marx sometimes used the quote while interviewing an attractive female contestant, then shake his cigar and raise his eyebrows to elicit a reaction. The line was also used in the Monty Python's Flying Circus "Spam" episode, in the "Dirty Hungarian Phrasebook" sketch in 1970. The comment stuck in Bellamy's head as a possible hook line for a song.

The song earned its first success in Northern Ireland, becoming a big hit in the United Kingdom, peaking at No. 3, before becoming a top 40 hit in the United States where it peaked at No. 39 on the Billboard Hot 100.

In a 2003 issue, Country Weekly magazine named it the number 1 country pick-up line of all time.

== Charts ==
=== Weekly charts ===
Chart (1979)	Peak position
Australia (Kent Music Report)	12
Canadian RPM Country Tracks	24
Dutch Top 40	11
New Zealand Singles Chart	17
UK Singles Chart	3
US Hot Country Songs (Billboard)	1
US Billboard Hot 100	39

=== Year-end charts ===
Year-end chart performance for "If I Said You Have a Beautiful Body Would You Hold It Against Me"
Chart (1979)	Position
Australia (Kent Music Report)	83

== Certifications ==
Certifications for If I Said You Have a Beautiful Body Would You Hold It Against Me
Region	Certification	Certified units/sales
New Zealand (RMNZ)	Gold	15,000^{‡}
^{‡} Sales+streaming figures based on certification alone.

== Re-recording ==
On their 2005 album Angels & Outlaws, Vol. 1, the Bellamy Brothers re-recorded this song with Dolly Parton. This rendition peaked at number 60 on the country charts, giving the Bellamy Brothers their first chart entry since "Not" in 1994.

== Britney Spears controversy ==
In 2011, the Brothers criticized pop singer Britney Spears's song "Hold It Against Me" for sounding similar to "If I Said You Have a Beautiful Body Would You Hold It Against Me". In a statement, David Bellamy said "professionally, well, in all honesty, we feel completely ripped off. Where's the originality?" The Bellamy Brothers' attorney Christopher E. Schmidt stated that "[it] becomes somewhat uncanny if you simply double the beat of the Bellamy Brothers' song and match it up with Britney's version" and pointed out that it was not the first time that songwriters Max Martin and Lukasz "Dr. Luke" Gottwald were accused of copyright infringement. On March 2, 2011, Max Martin, Dr. Luke, Bonnie McKee, and Mathieu "Billboard" Jomphe, all of whom wrote "Hold It Against Me", filed a lawsuit against the Bellamy Brothers for defamation and libel because of the accusations, but the Brothers apologized and the case was dismissed on August 11, 2011. The Brothers released a statement that said, "The Bellamy Brothers apologise to Dr. Luke and Max Martin for the Bellamys' public statements and any false impressions suggested by the statements on their website that Dr. Luke and Max Martin copy the works of others."

== In media ==
The song was performed karaoke-style by groom Alan Buttershaw (Derek Jacobi) during his wedding reception in season 2, episode 6 of Last Tango in Halifax (aired 3 August 2014).
