= Redneck Girl =

- German single cover

Single by The Bellamy Brothers

from the album Strong Weakness
- B-side: "Let Your Love Flow"
- Released: September 1982
- Genre: Country, country rock
- Length: 3:25
- Label: Elektra/Curb
- Songwriter(s): David Bellamy
- Producer(s): Jimmy Bowen, The Bellamy Brothers

The Bellamy Brothers singles chronology
"Get into Reggae Cowboy" (1982)	"Redneck Girl" (1982)	"When I'm Away from You" (1983)

"Redneck Girl" is a song written by David Bellamy, and recorded by American country music duo The Bellamy Brothers. It was released in September 1982 as the first single from the album Strong Weakness. The song was the sixth number one country hit for The Bellamy Brothers. The single went to number one for one week and spent a total of twelve weeks on the country chart.

== Cover versions ==
- Blake Shelton covered the song on the soundtrack to The Dukes of Hazzard: The Beginning.
- Tim McGraw covered the song as a duet with Midland for McGraw's 2020 compilation album McGraw Machine Hits: 2013-2019.

== Charts ==
Chart (1982)	Peak position
US Hot Country Songs (Billboard)	1
Canadian RPM Country Tracks	7
