= Kids of the Baby Boom =

Single by The Bellamy Brothers

from the album Country Rap
- B-side: "Hard on a Heart"
- Released: January 1987
- Genre: Country
- Length: 3:24
- Label: MCA/Curb
- Songwriter(s): David Bellamy
- Producer(s): Emory Gordy Jr.

The Bellamy Brothers singles chronology
"Too Much Is Not Enough" (1986)	"Kids of the Baby Boom" (1987)	"Country Rap" (1987)

"Kids of the Baby Boom" is a song written by David Bellamy, and recorded by American country music duo The Bellamy Brothers. It was released in January 1987 as the second single from the album Country Rap. The song was The Bellamy Brothers' tenth and final number one on the country chart. The single went to number one for one week and spent a total of fourteen weeks on the country chart.

== Charts ==
Chart (1987)	Peak position
US Hot Country Songs (Billboard)	1
Canadian RPM Country Tracks	3
