= Old Hippie =

Single by The Bellamy Brothers

from the album Howard & David
- B-side: "Wheels"
- Released: April 1985
- Recorded: March 1985
- Genre: Country, country rock, urban cowboy
- Length: 4:03
- Label: MCA/Curb 52579
- Songwriter: David Bellamy
- Producers: Emory Gordy Jr. and Jimmy Bowen

The Bellamy Brothers singles chronology
"I Need More of You" (1985)	"Old Hippie" (1985)	"Lie to You for Your Love" (1985)

"Old Hippie" is a song written by David Bellamy, and recorded by American country music duo The Bellamy Brothers. It was released in April 1985 as the first single from their album Howard & David.

The song reached No. 2 on the Billboard Hot Country Singles chart in July 1985 and No. 1 on the RPM Country Tracks chart in Canada. In June 2014, Rolling Stone magazine ranked "Old Hippie" 95th in their list of the 100 greatest country songs.

== Content ==
The song is about the unnamed title character, an aging hippie who uses marijuana, listens to the Woodstock-influenced rock music of the late 1960s, mourns the murder of John Lennon in 1980, and for years refuses to let go of his lifestyle, despite societal changes around him. It is also explained that he was drafted to Vietnam and forced to "become a man while he was still a boy." Afterward, he began waiting for something good to happen in his life, before adopting his lifestyle. Eventually, the man does change, taking up such interests as jogging while staying away from parties and nightclubs.

=== Sequels ===
A decade after the song's release, the brothers recorded a sequel song titled "Old Hippie (The Sequel)". The song follows the same unnamed title character 10 years after the original. Just as with "Old Hippie," the sequel sees the man—now with a thinning hairline—continuing to struggle with his memories of Vietnam and changes in society, only with updated references.The Bellamys re-visited the "Old Hippie" character on their 1996 holiday release, "Tropical Christmas." This release sees the hippie and his family celebrating the holiday with a mixture of mainstream and hippie traditions. While the current state of the world worries the character, he feels that the answers "start right here with him / So he'll visualize this sacred night a world that ain't out on a limb." In "Old Hippie 3 (Saved)", from the 2007 album Jesus Is Coming, the man—now 55—has found Jesus. "He still thinks about the crazy days but thanks his God above / that he traded in the love-ins for a greater kind of love."

== Charts ==
=== Weekly charts ===
Chart (1985)	Peak position
US Hot Country Songs (Billboard)	2
Canadian RPM Country Tracks	1

=== Year-end charts ===
Chart (1985)	Position
US Hot Country Songs (Billboard)	35

== See also ==
- List of anti-war songs
