= The Bellamy Brothers =

American music duo

Bellamy Brothers
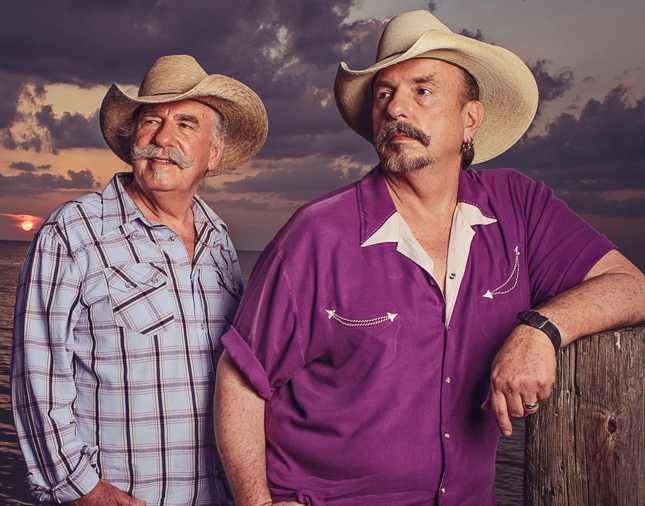
- The Bellamy Brothers in 2013: Howard (left) and David (right)

Background information
- Origin: Darby, Florida, U.S.
- Genre: Country
- Years active: 1968–present
- Labels: Curb/Warner Bros. Curb/Elektra; Curb/MCA; Atlantic; Jupiter; Bellamy Bros./Intersound; Blue Hat
- Members: David Bellamy; Howard Bellamy
- Website: bellamybrothers.com

The Bellamy Brothers are an American country music duo from Darby, Florida. The duo consists of brothers David Milton Bellamy (born September 16, 1950) and Homer Howard Bellamy (born February 2, 1946). The duo had considerable musical success in the 1970s and 1980s, starting with the release of their crossover hit "Let Your Love Flow" in 1976, a number-one single on the Billboard Hot 100.

Starting in the late 1970s, the Bellamy Brothers found success in country music, as well, charting 20 number-one singles, 25 top 10s, and more than 50 hits overall on the country charts. To date, they have released more than 50 albums, primarily on Curb Records. They have also enjoyed success in continental Europe, with a compilation album topping the Norwegian charts in 2011 and over two dozen hit songs that were released outside the US market. In 2013, their album Bellamy Brothers and Friends: Across the Sea landed at number five on the Swiss music chart and took the top spot in album sales for weeks in Switzerland. It was their third major release in Europe in three years. Their album Mermaid Cowgirl, recorded in Switzerland and released in 2014, won them gold record status in Switzerland. They also recorded four albums in Germany with Ralph Siegel for release to the European market.

== Early life ==
David and Howard Bellamy were inspired by many musical sources from an early age. Their father played country music around the house, and was also a member of a local Western swing band; in addition, they were inspired by the rock and roll music their sister played. Despite having never had formal music training, both brothers learned how to play guitar, mandolin, and banjo. In addition, David learned accordion, fiddle, organ, and piano.

Their first musical gig was in 1968 at a benefit concert with their father in San Antonio, Florida, at the Rattlesnake Roundup.

In the late '60s, the brothers and their band played for dances at the Dade City Civic Center and at Louie's in Brooksville. They played as The Accidents, and later as The Heterogeneous Grouping, performing covers of many of the popular rock and roll and Rhythm and blues tunes of the time. Three of their favorites were "A Whiter Shade of Pale", "My Girl", and "Little Bit O' Soul".

Their first paid gigs were playing fraternity parties at the University of Florida. Soon after, the brothers moved to Atlanta and formed a band called Jericho. However, playing in bands and clubs proved tiresome for the brothers, who soon moved back home. The brothers were soon noticed by a friend of recording artist Jim Stafford, who eventually recorded "Spiders & Snakes", written by Stafford and David. "Spiders & Snakes" went on to become a top five hit, providing the Bellamys with the money to move to Los Angeles. Howard became a road manager for Stafford.

== Music career ==
=== 1970s ===
The duo signed to Curb Records in 1975. A single featuring only David, "Nothin' Heavy", was unsuccessful. However, at the suggestion of Neil Diamond's drummer, Dennis St. John, the brothers recorded and released the single "Let Your Love Flow", written by Diamond's roadie Larry Williams. Released in 1976, "Let Your Love Flow" was a number-one single on the U.S. pop charts, as well as more than a dozen countries worldwide.

Although "Let Your Love Flow" was also a hit on the Hot Country Singles & Tracks chart, the Bellamys' country music success was limited until 1979, when "If I Said You Have a Beautiful Body Would You Hold It Against Me" was released. The song, with its double entendre title derived from a Groucho Marx quote, landed the Bellamys their first country music No. 1 in the United States. It was first played on radio in the United Kingdom in Northern Ireland in 1979 and went on to become Record of the Year in the UK in 1979. In a 2003 issue of Country Weekly magazine, the title was named the number 1 country pick-up line of all time.

=== 1980s and 1990s ===
After the success of "If I Said You Have a Beautiful Body Would You Hold It Against Me", the brothers continued with a run of country hits, including tunes such as "Redneck Girl", "Santa Fe", and the social commentary pieces "Old Hippie" and "Kids of the Baby Boom". Billboard named the Bellamy Brothers as Top Country Duo, and they eventually went on to set the record for most duo nominations from both the Academy of Country Music and Country Music Association.

The brothers worked on a number of collaborative efforts with other musicians during this period. They recorded "Too Much Is Not Enough" with The Forester Sisters in 1986 and "Drive South" with them in 1990. In 1993, they recorded "Stayin' in Love" with Freddy Fender and Flaco Jiménez. In 1997, they recorded "Catahoula" with Eddy Raven and Jo-El Sonnier, while in 1997, they recorded "Everyone's Somebody's Darlin'" with Nicolette Larson. In 1999, they recorded "(Don't Put Me In) The Ex Files" with Buck Owens, and that same year, they recorded "Vertical Expression" with Freddy Fender and then with Eduardo Araujo.

In 1991, the Bellamys switched to Atlantic Records. Their tenure there produced one album before the duo formed their own label, Bellamy Brothers Records. They were some of the first country music artists to have their own record label, and have been licensing albums from their own record label for 25 years. In 1999, they switched to Blue Hat Records for their Lonely Planet album.

=== 2000s ===
In 2005, the Bellamys returned to Curb Records to record Angels & Outlaws, Volume 1, a compilation album featuring re-recordings of the duo's older hits with additional artists, including Dolly Parton, George Jones, Alan Jackson, Tanya Tucker, and Montgomery Gentry. A re-recorded version of "If I Said You Had a Beautiful Body Would You Hold It Against Me", featuring Dolly Parton, spent one week at number 60 on the Billboard Hot Country Songs chart in 2005. In March 2007, "Redneck Girl" was covered by Blake Shelton on the soundtrack to The Dukes of Hazzard: The Beginning.

The Bellamys released an album of gospel music, titled Jesus Is Coming, on May 8, 2007. Its title track was previously recorded on Native American in 1995. The album received two Dove Award nominations, and a second gospel album, Pray for Me, was released in 2012. They had many guest singers on this album. Their sister Ginger sang with them on the song "Suppertime", and Deborah Allen sang background vocals with Vicky Hampton on the album. Irish actor and musician Kieran McHugh played penny whistle for the song "Hymn to Him".

In 2008, the song "Let Your Love Flow" was used in the Barclaycard advertisement for their new contactless cards. The song re-entered the UK singles chart at number 48 based on downloads, peaked at number 21 in the pop charts in March 2009, and was listed on BMI's list of Top 100 Song of the Century at number 68 that same year. A cover by Petra Haden was used in a 2010 Toyota Prius commercial.

The Anthology, Vol. 1, released in 2009, includes the single "Guilty of the Crime", which is a collaboration with the Bacon Brothers. The video features Shannen Doherty of Beverly Hills, 90210 fame. Both sets of brothers performed the song together on the Grand Ole Opry show in Nashville, Tennessee, on September 1, 2009.

In 2010, the Bellamys recorded The Greatest Hits Sessions with Swiss rock star Gölä (Marco Pfeuti) and the project sold double platinum in Europe. It was at number one of the Swiss Schweizer Hitparade for seven weeks. In 2011, they created BB&G Platinum with Gölä. Then, in 2014, they teamed up again with Gölä and recorded Mermaid Cowgirl in Switzerland. They achieved gold-record status in Switzerland with this album.

In June 2010, their song "Jalepeños", about the problems of political correctness, was banned before it could even be released to radio because of its profanity. The video became a major YouTube hit with almost 3 million views.

In 2012, the Bellamy Brothers collaborated with Austrian Schlager singer DJ Ötzi to create the album Simply the Best. It was DJ Ötzi's first full English-language album, and entered the German album charts at number three.

In June 2014, Rolling Stone magazine ranked "Old Hippie" at number 95 in their list of the 100 greatest country songs.

During these years, the brothers also worked on many other collaborative song efforts. They recorded "Hello, Lady Harley" with Truck Stop in 2003, worked with Alan Jackson in 2005, and collaborated with Tom Astor in 2007.

In April 2018, the group released the memoir Let Your Love Flow - The Life and Times of the Bellamy Brothers. The Bellamys then released their album Over the Moon in 2019, which consisted of 14 original songs written and recorded at the Bellamys' studio on their Darby ranch.

== Honky Tonk Ranch ==
In 2018, the brothers became the feature of the reality television series Honky Tonk Ranch, which aired on the Cowboy Channel, RFD-TV, Circle Network and now on YouTube. The series follows the Bellamys in addition to their friends and family. In 2020, the show moved to the Circle Network, and later to YouTube where seasons one and two aired along with season three.

== Personal life ==
In the late 1990s, David's sons Noah and Jesse became active in the music scene, and the sons currently perform as the duo Jesse and Noah.

The Bellamy Brothers live in Darby, Florida, on a 200-acre ranch, where they raise Brahman cattle and quarter horses, with three generations of their family living in the compound. The ranch is also the location of the recording studio where much of their work is recorded.

In 2020, the brothers partnered with Florida medical cannabis company Trulieve to produce a signature line of cannabis products named "Old Hippie Stash". Said David: "[Cannabis has] helped Howard and me on many levels. There was a stigma for so long, but now people are talking about it seriously and considering cannabis as an alternative for stress, anxiety, pain management, and many other health factors."

== Honors and awards ==
- Grammy nomination for Best Country Performance by a duo or group and Best Country and Western Song (1980)
- Named the Most Promising Group of the Year by CMA (1980)
- Lifetime Membership of the Federation of International Country Air Personalities (1982)
- Named Top Country Duo by Billboard (1982)
- Record for the most duo nominations in both the Academy of Country Music (ACM) and the Country Music Association Awards (CMA)
- "Let Your Love Flow" placed on the BMI list of the top 100 most-played songs of the 20th century (1999)
- Received two Dove nominations for "Jesus Is Coming"
- Members of the German Country Music Hall of Fame (only American members with the exception of Johnny Cash)
- "Old Hippie" named by Rolling Stone as one of its top 100 greatest country songs of all time (2014)
- Inducted into the Florida Artists Hall of Fame (2018)

== Tours ==
The brothers have 200 or more concert dates worldwide each year. They have had concerts in the United States, Europe, Australia, and South Africa, and have been to distant (from their US base) places such as Dubai, Saudi Arabia, India, Sri Lanka, New Caledonia, Qatar, the Faroe Islands, and the Czech Republic. In 1999, the Bellamy Brothers played for American troops stationed in Bosnia, and on Easter Sunday 2000, they gave a concert for American troops in war-torn Kosovo, as well as a concert at a remote camp in Macedonia. In 2014, they toured in India and Sri Lanka, and made history as the first country music act touring in those Asian countries. In 2019 and 2020, the Bellamy Brothers participated in Blake Shelton's "Friends and Heroes Tour".

== Charities ==
The brothers have traveled around the world playing benefit concerts for American troops abroad, including performances throughout Germany, Italy, Japan, Guam, South Korea, Bosnia, and Kosovo. Their concert at Camp Bondsteel in Kosovo in 2000 was the first time that the base had allowed a band to play. In 2011, the brothers supported earthquake victims in New Zealand when they joined the New Zealand Red Cross and Judy Seale International to raise support through live auctions. In 2016, the Bellamy Brothers partnered with the Susan G. Komen Foundation to release a video for "Let Your Love Flow." They supported the foundation's breast cancer research by donating one dollar for every digital download of their 40 Year package.
