= Billboard Year-End Hot 100 singles of 1974 =

Ranking of recorded music

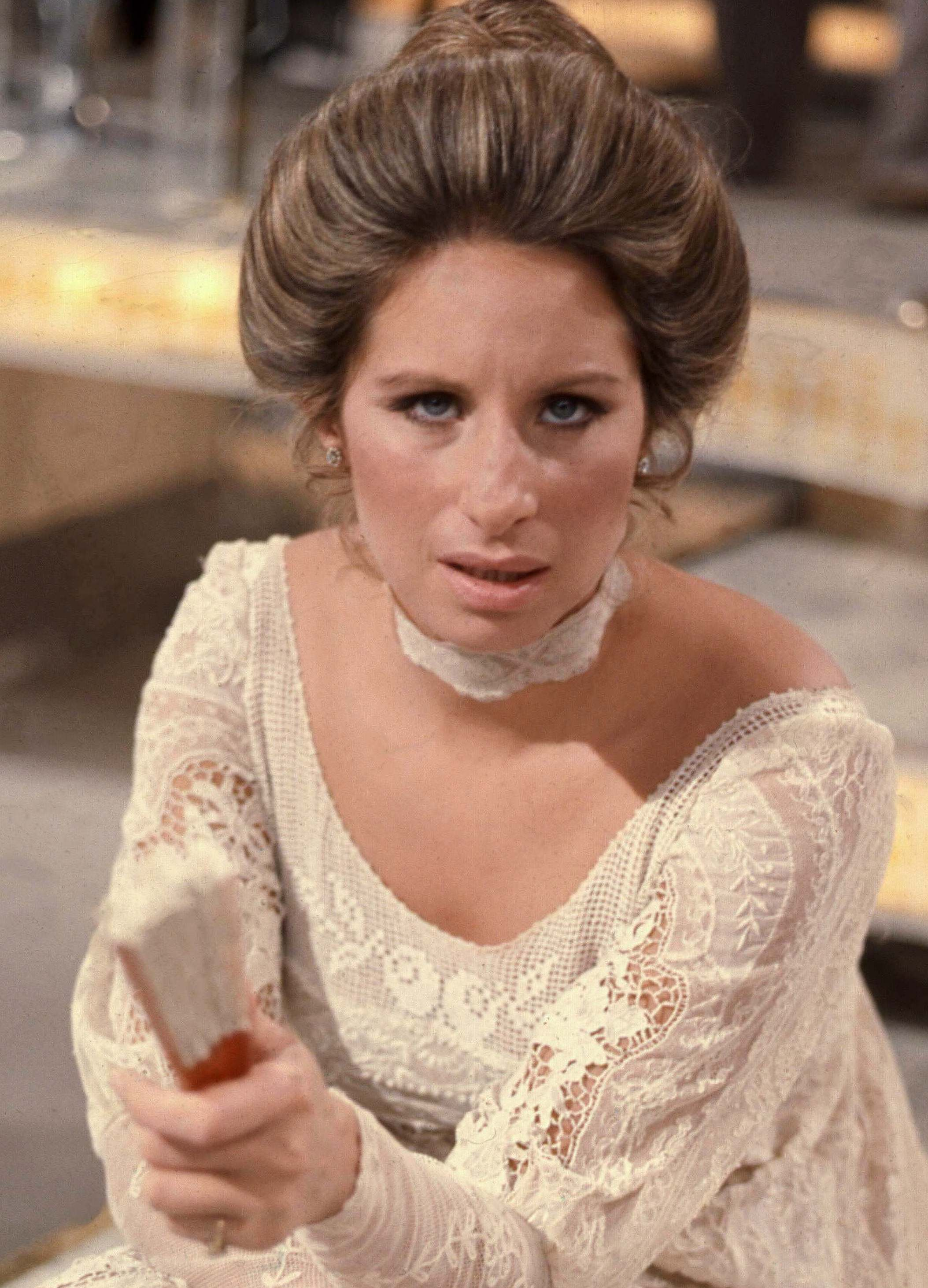
"The Way We Were" by Barbra Streisand was the number one song of 1974.

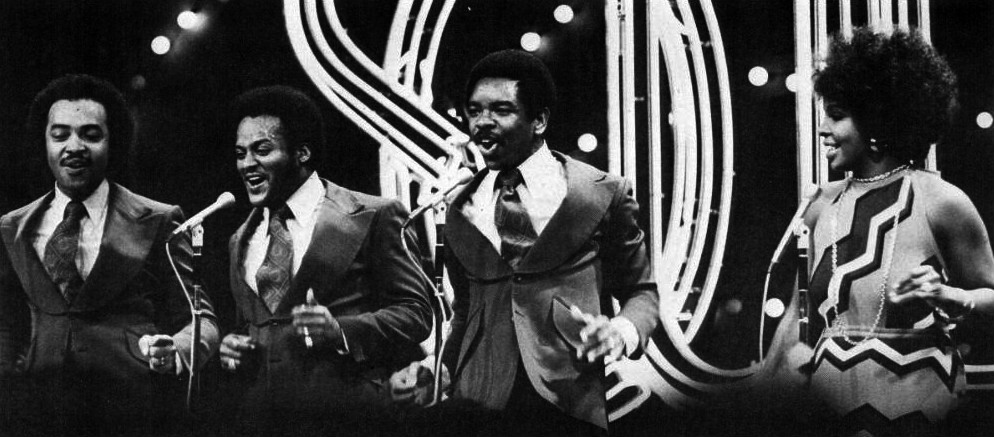
Gladys Knight and the Pips had three songs on 1974's year-end chart: "Best Thing That Ever Happened to Me" (number 34), "I've Got to Use My Imagination" (number 41), and "On and On" (number 69).

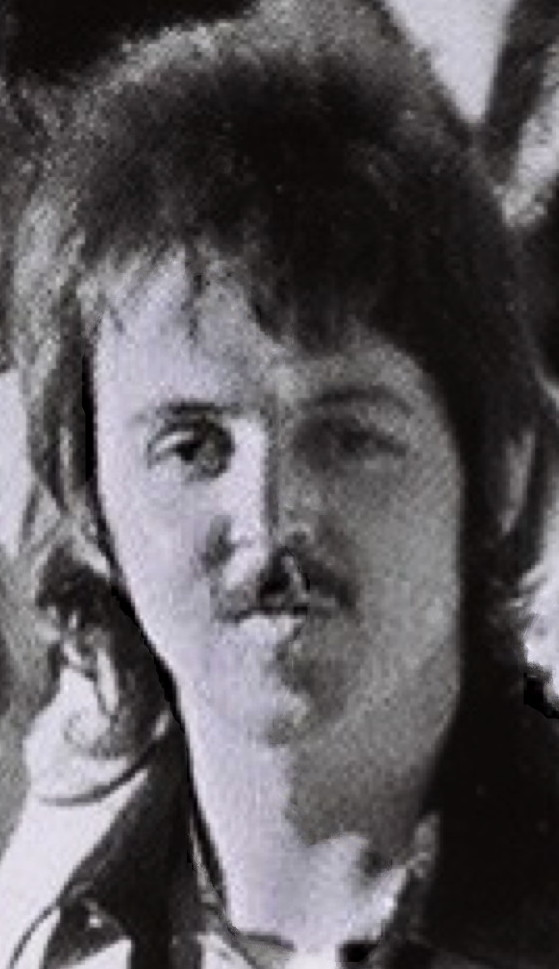
Paul McCartney (pictured) and his band Wings had one top-40 single on the year-end chart ("Band on the Run" at number 22) and two others on the chart ("Jet" and "Helen Wheels".)

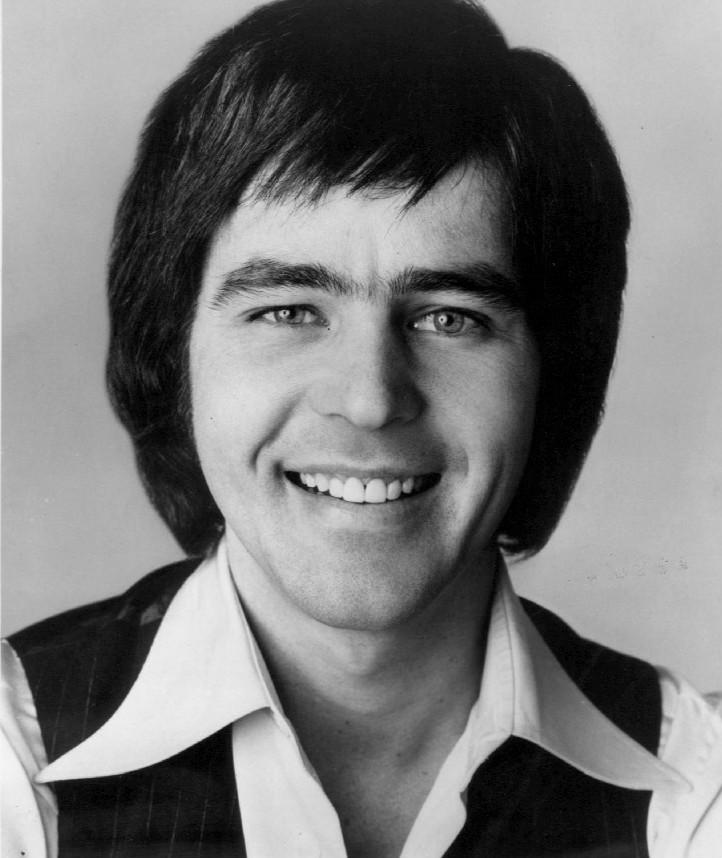
Jim Stafford's song "Spiders and Snakes" appeared at number 16 on the year-end chart; his songs "My Girl Bill" and "Wildwood Weed" also charted.

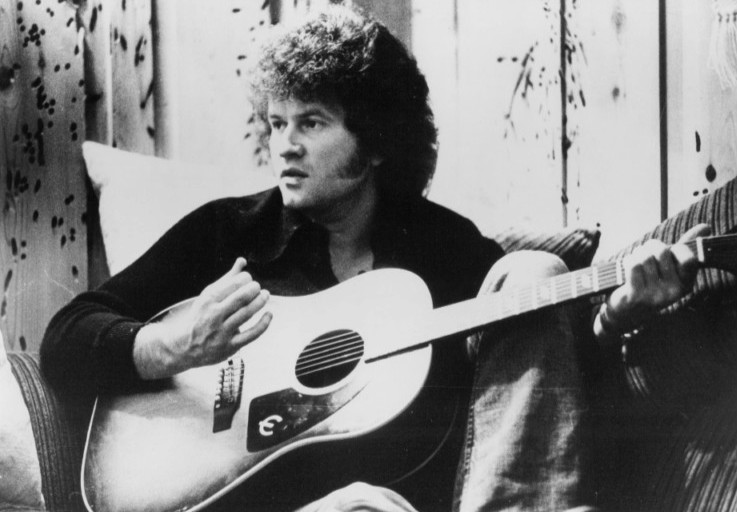
Terry Jacks's song "Seasons in the Sun" was the number-two song of 1974's year-end chart.

This is a list of Billboard magazine's Top Hot 100 singles of 1974. The Top 100, as revealed in the Talent In Action section of Billboard dated December 28, 1974, is based on Hot 100 charts from the issue dates of November 24, 1973, through October 26, 1974.

No.	Title	Artist(s)
1	"The Way We Were"	Barbra Streisand
2	"Seasons in the Sun"	Terry Jacks
3	"Love's Theme"	Love Unlimited Orchestra
4	"Come and Get Your Love"	Redbone
5	"Dancing Machine"	The Jackson 5
6	"The Loco-Motion"	Grand Funk Railroad
7	"TSOP (The Sound of Philadelphia)"	MFSB & The Three Degrees
8	"The Streak"	Ray Stevens
9	"Bennie and the Jets"	Elton John
10	"One Hell of a Woman"	Mac Davis
11	"Until You Come Back to Me (That's What I'm Gonna Do)"	Aretha Franklin
12	"Jungle Boogie"	Kool & the Gang
13	"Midnight at the Oasis"	Maria Muldaur
14	"You Make Me Feel Brand New"	The Stylistics
15	"Show and Tell"	Al Wilson
16	"Spiders and Snakes"	Jim Stafford
17	"Rock On"	David Essex
18	"Sunshine on My Shoulders"	John Denver
19	"Sideshow"	Blue Magic
20	"Hooked on a Feeling"	Blue Swede
21	"Billy Don't Be a Hero"	Bo Donaldson and The Heywoods
22	"Band on the Run"	Paul McCartney and Wings
23	"The Most Beautiful Girl"	Charlie Rich
24	"Time in a Bottle"	Jim Croce
25	"Annie's Song"	John Denver
26	"Let Me Be There"	Olivia Newton-John
27	"Sundown"	Gordon Lightfoot
28	"(You're) Having My Baby"	Paul Anka
29	"Rock Me Gently"	Andy Kim
30	"Boogie Down"	Eddie Kendricks
31	"You're Sixteen"	Ringo Starr
32	"If You Love Me (Let Me Know)"	Olivia Newton-John
33	"Dark Lady"	Cher
34	"Best Thing That Ever Happened to Me"	Gladys Knight & the Pips
35	"Feel Like Makin' Love"	Roberta Flack
36	"Just Don't Want to Be Lonely"	The Main Ingredient
37	"Nothing from Nothing"	Billy Preston
38	"Rock Your Baby"	George McCrae
39	"Top of the World"	The Carpenters
40	"The Joker"	Steve Miller Band
41	"I've Got to Use My Imagination"	Gladys Knight & the Pips
42	"The Show Must Go On"	Three Dog Night
43	"Rock the Boat"	The Hues Corporation
44	"Smokin' in the Boys Room"	Brownsville Station
45	"Living for the City"	Stevie Wonder
46	"Then Came You"	Dionne Warwick & The Spinners
47	"The Night Chicago Died"	Paper Lace
48	"The Entertainer"	Marvin Hamlisch
49	"Waterloo"	ABBA
50	"The Air That I Breathe"	The Hollies
51	"Rikki Don't Lose That Number"	Steely Dan
52	"Mockingbird"	Carly Simon & James Taylor
53	"Help Me"	Joni Mitchell
54	"You Won't See Me"	Anne Murray
55	"Never, Never Gonna Give You Up"	Barry White
56	"Tell Me Something Good"	Rufus & Chaka Khan
57	"You and Me Against the World"	Helen Reddy
58	"Rock and Roll Heaven"	The Righteous Brothers
59	"Hollywood Swinging"	Kool & the Gang
60	"Be Thankful for What You Got"	William DeVaughn
61	"Hang on in There Baby"	Johnny Bristol
62	"Eres tú"	Mocedades
63	"Takin' Care of Business"	Bachman-Turner Overdrive
64	"Radar Love"	Golden Earring
65	"Please Come to Boston"	Dave Loggins
66	"Keep on Smilin'"	Wet Willie
67	"Lookin' for a Love"	Bobby Womack
68	"Put Your Hands Together"	The O'Jays
69	"On and On"	Gladys Knight & the Pips
70	"Oh Very Young"	Cat Stevens
71	"Leave Me Alone (Ruby Red Dress)"	Helen Reddy
72	"Goodbye Yellow Brick Road"	Elton John
73	"(I've Been) Searchin' So Long"	Chicago
74	"Oh My My"	Ringo Starr
75	"For the Love of Money"	The O'Jays
76	"I Shot the Sheriff"	Eric Clapton
77	"Jet"	Paul McCartney and Wings
78	"Don't Let the Sun Go Down on Me"	Elton John
79	"Tubular Bells"	Mike Oldfield
80	"A Love Song"	Anne Murray
81	"I'm Leaving It (All) Up to You"	Donny and Marie Osmond
82	"Hello It's Me"	Todd Rundgren
83	"I Love"	Tom T. Hall
84	"Clap for the Wolfman"	The Guess Who featuring Wolfman Jack
85	"I'll Have to Say I Love You in a Song"	Jim Croce
86	"The Lord's Prayer"	Sister Janet Mead
87	"Trying to Hold on to My Woman"	Lamont Dozier
88	"Don't You Worry 'bout a Thing"	Stevie Wonder
89	"A Very Special Love Song"	Charlie Rich
90	"My Girl Bill"	Jim Stafford
91	"Helen Wheels"	Paul McCartney and Wings
92	"My Mistake (Was to Love You)"	Diana Ross & Marvin Gaye
93	"Wildwood Weed"	Jim Stafford
94	"Beach Baby"	The First Class
95	"Me and Baby Brother"	War
96	"Rockin' Roll Baby"	The Stylistics
97	"I Honestly Love You"	Olivia Newton-John
98	"Call on Me"	Chicago
99	"Wild Thing"	Fancy
100	"Mighty Love"	The Spinners

== See also ==
- 1974 in music
- Billboard Year-End Hot Soul Singles of 1974
- List of Billboard Hot 100 number-one singles of 1974
- List of Billboard Hot 100 top-ten singles in 1974
