= Phil Gernhard =

American record executive (1940–2008)

- Born: Phillip Arnold Gernhard; February 5, 1940; Evanston, Illinois, U.S.
- Origin: Sarasota, Florida, U.S.
- Died: February 22, 2008 (aged 68) Nashville, Tennessee, U.S.
- Occupations: Record producer, music industry executive, songwriter
- Years active: 1959–2008
- Formerly of: Maurice Williams and the Zodiacs; The Royal Guardsmen; Dion; Lobo; Jim Stafford; Bellamy Brothers

Phillip Arnold Gernhard (February 5, 1940 – February 22, 2008) was an American record producer, record label executive, and songwriter. He is best known for his successful collaborations in the 1960s and 1970s with Maurice Williams and the Zodiacs, The Royal Guardsmen, Dion, Lobo, Jim Stafford, and the Bellamy Brothers.

== Biography ==
Gernhard was born in Evanston, Illinois, the son of Boyd "Bud" Gernhard and his wife, Sara Arnold. In 1943, he moved with his parents and sister to Sarasota, Florida, where he attended Sarasota High School, and saw Elvis Presley perform in 1956.

After graduating he studied at the University of South Carolina, and developed a love of rhythm and blues music. In 1959 he started a record label, Cole, with friend Vince Cole, and also set up a production company, Briarwood, with another friend, Johnny McCullough. Although they lacked musical training, they decided to record local vocal group Maurice Williams and the Zodiacs. In 1960, Gernhard produced a demo of Williams' song "Stay", recorded at the studio of local Columbia radio station WCOS. After being rejected by a number of record labels, Al Silver of Herald Records offered to release the record if they re-recorded it, and when finally released in 1960 it rose to the top of the Billboard pop chart.

Gernhard was introduced to songwriter Dick Holler, then performing locally in South Carolina with his group, the Holidays. Gernhard and McCullough produced several singles by the group, including "Double Shot (Of My Baby's Love)", later a hit for the Swingin' Medallions, and also worked with other local musicians including Dennis Coffey and Linda Martell. However, his records had little success and in about 1963 he gave up the business and re-enrolled on a course of law studies at the University of Tampa. He soon re-engaged with the music scene, and produced records by local group the Sugar Beats, whose rhythm guitarist was Kent Lavoie, as well as other local bands, the Tropics and the Outsiders (later known as the Soul Trippers).

In 1966, after Charles M. Schulz introduced the theme of Snoopy fighting the Red Baron in his Peanuts comic strip on Sunday October 10, 1965, Gernhard remembered that Dick Holler and his band had recorded a song about the historical Red Baron several years earlier. He partly rewrote the lyrics to incorporate mentions of Snoopy, and persuaded another local band, the Royal Guardsmen, to record it, becoming their manager as well as record producer. Their record, "Snoopy vs. the Red Baron", released by Laurie Records, reached number 2 on the Hot 100 at the end of 1966. Gernhard produced the band's album, also entitled Snoopy vs. The Red Baron, and their later records, including the 1967 hit "Snoopy's Christmas".

Gernhard abandoned his law studies and set up Gernhard Enterprises. He continued to produce records with the Royal Guardsmen, and also promoted shows in the Tampa area, on one occasion bailing Janis Joplin out of jail after she was arrested for shouting obscenities. In 1968, immediately after Robert F. Kennedy's assassination, Gernhard's songwriting partner Dick Holler wrote the song "Abraham, Martin and John". Gernhard offered the song to Laurie Records, where it was recorded by Dion, then just emerging from a spell in rehab. The song became a hit, reaching number 4 on the Hot 100, and Gernhard produced Dion's self-titled album that followed, as well as the singer's subsequent albums, Sit Down Old Friend, You're Not Alone, and Sanctuary.

Gernhard became an executive with Big Tree Records set up by Doug Morris. In 1970, he started working with former Sugar Beats member Kent Lavoie, and produced his first record under the pseudonym Lobo, "Me and You and a Dog Named Boo". The record became an international hit, reaching number 5 on the US pop chart, and Gernhard continued to work with Lobo throughout the 1970s. He produced the 1972 hit single "I'd Love You to Want Me", and five Lobo albums on the Big Tree label: Introducing Lobo (1971), Of a Simple Man (1972), Calumet (1973), Just a Singer (1974), and A Cowboy Afraid of Horses (1975), all of which reached the Billboard 200 album chart. Less successfully, Gernhard tried to find success for the Nashville country rock band Duckbutter, and Barry Winslow, the former lead singer of the Royal Guardsmen.

Gernhard and Lobo discovered Jim Stafford, who had been working as a singer-songwriter in local clubs with little success. Gernhard established a connection with Mike Curb, the head of MGM Records, and persuaded him to release Stafford's records. Gernhard and Lobo co-produced Stafford's hits "Spiders & Snakes" – a song written by David Bellamy – "My Girl Bill", and "Wildwood Weed", as well as Stafford's major label debut album (1974) and Not Just Another Pretty Foot (1975).

Gernhard began working more in Los Angeles, and formed a business partnership with actor and producer Tony Scotti, aiming to establish Stafford as a variety show host. They also signed David and his brother Howard Bellamy, as The Bellamy Brothers, and produced "Let Your Love Flow", which rose to number one on the Hot 100 in early 1976. Gernhard also produced the duo's first two albums, Let Your Love Flow (1976) and Plain & Fancy (1977), on Curb Records.

Lobo's relationship with Gernhard soured when the singer attempted to gain some of the publishing rights for his songs, which Gernhard controlled. In the later 1970s and early 1980s, Gernhard worked with Hank Williams Jr. – co-producing his album Family Tradition – as well as with the bands Prisoner, Arrogance, and Snuff, with limited success.

He gave up record production, but continued to work with Mike Curb in an executive capacity. From 1992, Gernhard worked for Curb Records in Nashville, Tennessee, in later years as senior vice president responsible for A&R. He developed and promoted country singer Tim McGraw, and later Jo Dee Messina and Rodney Atkins.

Gernhard committed suicide by gunshot in 2008. He had told friends that he was suffering from cancer, but an autopsy found no trace.

Gernhard was married and divorced four times, and had experienced alcoholism and drug misuse. He left his estate to a former childhood sweetheart, with whom he had been out of touch for many years.
