= List of Billboard Hot 100 top-ten singles in 1974 =

This is a list of singles that have peaked in the Top 10 of the Billboard Hot 100 during 1974.

Elton John scored five top ten hits during the year with "Goodbye Yellow Brick Road", "Bennie and the Jets", "Don't Let the Sun Go Down on Me", "The Bitch Is Back", and "Lucy in the Sky with Diamonds", the most among all other artists.

== Top-ten singles ==
- (#) – 1974 Year-end top 10 single position and rank (Despite not reaching the top 10 on the Billboard Hot 100 peaking at #11, One Hell of a Woman by Mac Davis reached #10 on the Year-end Hot 100 single chart of 1974.)

List of Billboard Hot 100 top ten singles which peaked in 1974
Top ten entry date	Single	Artist(s)	Peak	Peak date	Weeks in top ten
Singles from 1973
December 15	"The Joker"	Steve Miller Band	1	January 12	8
December 22	"Never, Never Gonna Give Ya Up"	Barry White	7	January 12	4
December 29	"Show and Tell"	Al Wilson	1	January 19	7
December 29	"Smokin' in the Boys Room"	Brownsville Station	3	January 19	5
Singles from 1974
January 5	"I've Got to Use My Imagination"	Gladys Knight & the Pips	4	January 19	6
January 5	"Living for the City"	Stevie Wonder	8	January 12	3
January 12	"You're Sixteen"	Ringo Starr	1	January 26	7
January 12	"Let Me Be There"	Olivia Newton-John	6	February 9	7
January 12	"Helen Wheels"	Paul McCartney & Wings	10	January 12	1
January 19	"The Way We Were" (#1)	Barbra Streisand	1	February 2	9
January 19	"Love's Theme" (#3)	The Love Unlimited Orchestra	1	February 9	7
January 26	"The Americans"	Byron MacGregor	4	February 9	4
February 2	"Until You Come Back to Me (That's What I'm Gonna Do)"	Aretha Franklin	3	February 23	6
February 2	"Spiders & Snakes"	Jim Stafford	3	March 2	7
February 9	"Jungle Boogie"	Kool & the Gang	4	March 9	7
February 16	"Boogie Down"	Eddie Kendricks	2	March 9	6
February 16	"Rock On"	David Essex	5	March 9	5
February 23	"Seasons in the Sun" (#2)	Terry Jacks	1	March 2	8
March 2	"Dark Lady"	Cher	1	March 23	6
March 2	"Put Your Hands Together"	The O'Jays	10	March 2	1
March 9	"Sunshine on My Shoulders"	John Denver	1	March 30	7
March 9	"Mockingbird"	Carly Simon and James Taylor	5	March 23	6
March 16	"Jet"	Paul McCartney & Wings	7	March 30	3
March 23	"Hooked on a Feeling"	Blue Swede	1	April 6	7
March 23	"Bennie and the Jets" (#9)	Elton John	1	April 13	9
March 23	"Eres tú"	Mocedades	9	March 23	2
March 30	"The Lord's Prayer"	Sister Janet Mead	4	April 13	4
March 30	"Come and Get Your Love" (#4)	Redbone	5	April 13	5
April 6	"TSOP (The Sound of Philadelphia)" (#7)	MFSB featuring The Three Degrees	1	April 20	6
April 6	"Best Thing That Ever Happened to Me"	Gladys Knight & the Pips	3	April 27	5
April 13	"Oh My My"	Ringo Starr	5	April 27	3
April 20	"The Loco-Motion" (#6)	Grand Funk Railroad	1	May 4	6
April 20	"I'll Have to Say I Love You in a Song"	Jim Croce	9	April 27	2
April 27	"Dancing Machine" (#5)	The Jackson 5	2	May 18	9
April 27	"Lookin' for a Love"	Bobby Womack	10	April 27	1
May 4	"The Streak" (#8)	Ray Stevens	1	May 18	8
May 4	"The Show Must Go On"	Three Dog Night	4	May 25	4
May 4	"Tubular Bells"	Mike Oldfield	7	May 11	2
May 4	"Just Don't Want to Be Lonely"	The Main Ingredient	10	May 4	1
May 11	"The Entertainer"	Marvin Hamlisch	3	May 18	7
May 11	"Midnight at the Oasis"	Maria Muldaur	6	June 1	6
May 11	"(I've Been) Searchin' So Long"	Chicago	9	May 11	3
May 18	"Band on the Run"	Paul McCartney & Wings	1	June 8	7
May 18	"You Make Me Feel Brand New"	The Stylistics	2	June 15	8
May 25	"Help Me"	Joni Mitchell	7	June 8	3
June 1	"Billy Don't Be a Hero"	Bo Donaldson and The Heywoods	1	June 15	7
June 1	"Sundown"	Gordon Lightfoot	1	June 29	7
June 1	"Oh Very Young"	Cat Stevens	10	June 1	1
June 8	"For the Love of Money"	The O'Jays	9	June 15	2
June 15	"Be Thankful for What You Got"	William DeVaughn	4	June 29	3
June 22	"If You Love Me (Let Me Know)"	Olivia Newton-John	5	June 29	4
June 22	"Hollywood Swinging"	Kool & the Gang	6	July 6	3
June 29	"Rock the Boat"	The Hues Corporation	1	July 6	5
June 29	"Rock Your Baby"	George McCrae	1	July 13	5
June 29	"Annie's Song"	John Denver	1	July 27	7
July 6	"On and On"	Gladys Knight & the Pips	5	July 13	3
July 6	"You Won't See Me"	Anne Murray	8	July 13	3
July 13	"Don't Let the Sun Go Down on Me"	Elton John	2	July 27	5
July 13	"Rock and Roll Heaven"	The Righteous Brothers	3	July 20	4
July 13	"The Air That I Breathe"	The Hollies	6	August 3	4
July 20	"Rikki Don't Lose That Number"	Steely Dan	4	August 3	3
July 27	"Feel Like Makin' Love"	Roberta Flack	1	August 10	6
July 27	"Please Come to Boston"	Dave Loggins	5	August 10	4
July 27	"Call on Me"	Chicago	6	August 10	4
August 3	"The Night Chicago Died"	Paper Lace	1	August 17	6
August 3	"Sideshow"	Blue Magic	8	August 10	3
August 10	"Waterloo"	ABBA	6	August 24	3
August 10	"Tell Me Something Good"	Rufus and Chaka Khan	3	August 24	6
August 10	"Wildwood Weed"	Jim Stafford	7	August 24	4
August 17	"(You're) Having My Baby"	Paul Anka and Odia Coates	1	August 24	6
August 17	"I'm Leaving It Up to You"	Donny and Marie Osmond	4	September 14	5
August 24	"I Shot the Sheriff"	Eric Clapton	1	September 14	5
August 24	"Rock Me Gently"	Andy Kim	1	September 28	6
August 24	"Keep On Smilin'"	Wet Willie	10	August 24	1
August 31	"Can't Get Enough of Your Love, Babe"	Barry White	1	September 21	4
August 31	"You and Me Against the World"	Helen Reddy	9	September 7	3
September 7	"Nothing from Nothing"	Billy Preston	1	October 19	7
September 7	"Then Came You"	Dionne Warwick & Spinners	1	October 26	8
September 14	"Clap for the Wolfman"	The Guess Who	6	October 5	4
September 21	"I Honestly Love You"	Olivia Newton-John	1	October 5	5
September 21	"You Haven't Done Nothin'"	Stevie Wonder	1	November 2	7
September 21	"Hang On in There Baby"	Johnny Bristol	8	October 5	3
September 28	"Beach Baby"	The First Class	4	October 5	3
September 28	"Another Saturday Night"	Cat Stevens	6	October 12	3
September 28	"Sweet Home Alabama"	Lynyrd Skynyrd	8	October 26	4
October 5	"Earache My Eye"	Cheech & Chong	9	October 12	2
October 12	"The Bitch Is Back"	Elton John	4	November 2	5
October 12	"Can't Get Enough"	Bad Company	5	November 2	4
October 12	"Never My Love"	Blue Swede	7	October 19	2
October 19	"Jazzman"	Carole King	2	November 9	4
October 19	"Steppin' Out (Gonna Boogie Tonight)"	Tony Orlando and Dawn	7	October 26	3
October 19	"Love Me for a Reason"	The Osmonds	10	October 19	2
October 26	"You Ain't Seen Nothing Yet" (Note: "You Ain't Seen Nothing Yet" was b/w "Free Wheelin'", which appeared for the first time on the December 7, 1974 chart, the single's final week in the top ten.)	Bachman–Turner Overdrive	1	November 9	5
October 26	"Stop and Smell the Roses"	Mac Davis	9	October 26	2
November 2	"Whatever Gets You thru the Night"	John Lennon	1	November 16	3
November 2	"Tin Man"	America	4	November 9	4
November 9	"Do It ('Til You're Satisfied)"	B. T. Express	2	November 16	7
November 9	"My Melody of Love"	Bobby Vinton	3	November 16	5
November 9	"Back Home Again"	John Denver	5	November 9	3
November 9	"Life Is a Rock (But the Radio Rolled Me)"	Reunion	8	November 16	2
November 9	"Carefree Highway"	Gordon Lightfoot	10	November 9	2
November 16	"I Can Help"	Billy Swan	1	November 23	6
November 16	"Longfellow Serenade"	Neil Diamond	5	November 23	3
November 16	"Everlasting Love"	Carl Carlton	6	November 23	3
November 23	"Kung Fu Fighting"	Carl Douglas	1	December 7	8
November 23	"Cat's in the Cradle"	Harry Chapin	1	December 21	6
November 23	"When Will I See You Again"	The Three Degrees	2	December 14	6
November 30	"Angie Baby"	Helen Reddy	1	December 28	6
December 7	"Sha-La-La (Make Me Happy)"	Al Green	7	December 21	3

=== 1973 peaks ===
List of Billboard Hot 100 top ten singles in 1974 which peaked in 1973
Top ten entry date	Single	Artist(s)	Peak	Peak date	Weeks in top ten
November 24	"Goodbye Yellow Brick Road"	Elton John	2	December 8	7
December 1	"The Most Beautiful Girl"	Charlie Rich	1	December 15	6
December 8	"Leave Me Alone (Ruby Red Dress)"	Helen Reddy	3	December 29	5
December 15	"Time in a Bottle"	Jim Croce	1	December 29	7

=== 1975 peaks ===
List of Billboard Hot 100 top ten singles in 1974 which peaked in 1975
Top ten entry date	Single	Artist(s)	Peak	Peak date	Weeks in top ten
December 7	"You're the First, the Last, My Everything"	Barry White	2	January 4	7
December 14	"Lucy in the Sky with Diamonds"	Elton John	1	January 4	6
December 14	"Junior's Farm" / "Sally G"	Paul McCartney & Wings	3	January 11	6
December 28	"Laughter in the Rain"	Neil Sedaka	1	February 1	7
December 28	"Boogie On Reggae Woman"	Stevie Wonder	3	February 1	8
December 28	"Only You"	Ringo Starr	6	January 11	3

== See also ==
- 1974 in music
- List of Billboard Hot 100 number ones of 1974
- Billboard Year-End Hot 100 singles of 1974
