= Don't Tell Me Goodnight =

1975 single by Lobo

Single by Lobo

from the album A Cowboy Afraid of Horses
- B-side: "My Momma Had Soul"
- Released: 1975
- Studio: Sound Labs
- Genre: Soft rock
- Length: 3:03
- Label: Big Tree
- Songwriter: Kent LaVoie
- Producer: Phil Gernhard

Lobo singles chronology
"Rings" (1974)	"Don't Tell Me Goodnight" (1975)	"Would I Still Have You" (1975)

"Don't Tell Me Goodnight" is a song by American singer-songwriter Lobo. It was released as a single in 1975 from his album A Cowboy Afraid of Horses.

The song peaked at No. 27 on the Billboard Hot 100, becoming his final top 40 hit until 1979's "Where Were You When I Was Falling in Love". It was a Top 5 hit on the Easy Listening chart, peaking at No. 2.

== Chart performance ==
Chart (1975)	Peak position
US Billboard Hot 100	27
US Billboard Easy Listening	2
