= It Sure Took a Long, Long Time =

1973 single by Lobo

Single by Lobo

from the album Calumet
- B-side: "Running Deer"
- Released: 1973
- Studio: Mastersound Studios
- Genre: Soft rock
- Length: 3:06
- Label: Big Tree
- Songwriter: Kent LaVoie
- Producer: Phil Gernhard

Lobo singles chronology
| "Don't Expect Me to Be Your Friend" (1972) | "It Sure Took a Long, Long Time" (1973) | "How Can I Tell Her" (1973) |

"It Sure Took a Long, Long Time" is a song by American singer-songwriter Lobo. It was released as a single in 1973 from his album Calumet.

The song became a Top 40 hit on the Billboard Hot 100, peaking at No. 27. It was also a Top 5 hit on the Adult Contemporary chart, peaking at No. 3.

== Chart performance ==
| Chart (1973) | Peak position |
|---|---|
| Australia (Kent Music Report) | 49 |
| New Zealand (Listener) | 14 |
| US Billboard Hot 100 | 27 |
| US Billboard Easy Listening | 3 |
