= A Cowboy Afraid of Horses =

Studio album by Lobo
- Released: 1975
- Recorded: 1975
- Studio: Sound Labs
- Genres: Folk rock, soft rock
- Label: Big Tree
- Producer: Phil Gernhard

Lobo chronology
| Just a Singer (1974) | A Cowboy Afraid of Horses (1975) | Come with Me (1976) |

Singles from A Cowboy Afraid of Horses
- 1. "Don't Tell Me Goodnight" Released: 1975; 2. "Would I Still Have You" Released: 1975

A Cowboy Afraid of Horses is the fifth album by Lobo and his final album on Big Tree Records, released in 1975. The album, along with Just a Singer, was reissued in 1997 by Rhino Records as a single issue under the said title.

The album peaked at No. 151 on the US Top LPs chart, becoming his final album to chart to date. "Don't Tell Me Goodnight" peaked at No. 27 on the Billboard Hot 100, becoming his final Top 40 hit until 1979's "Where Were You When I Was Falling in Love".

== Track listing ==
All songs are written by Kent LaVoie.

Side A
| No. | Title | Length |
|---|---|---|
| 1. | "Would I Still Have You" | 3:42 |
| 2. | "The War to End All Wars" | 1:39 |
| 3. | "My Momma Had Soul" | 2:38 |
| 4. | "Three Pick-Ups" | 3:08 |
| 5. | "Morning Sun" | 3:46 |
| 6. | "Don't Tell Me Goodnight" | 3:03 |

Side B
| No. | Title | Length |
|---|---|---|
| 7. | "A Cowboy Afraid of Horses" | 4:32 |
| 8. | "Then I Met You" | 3:02 |
| 9. | "Something to See Me Through" | 3:13 |
| 10. | "Thinking of You" | 3:17 |
| 11. | "Everyday Is My Way" | 3:32 |
| 12. | "However" | 0:54 |

== Personnel ==
- Lobo – guitar, lead vocals
- Emory Gordy Jr. – bass
- Jerry Scheff – bass
- Ron Tutt – drums
- Larry Carlton – guitar
- Richard Bennett – guitar
- Alan Lindgren – keyboards
- Larry Knechtel – keyboards
- King Errisson – congas

Production

- Record producer: Phil Gernhard
- Engineer: Michael Lietz
- Photography: Craig Brown

== Charts ==
Album

| Chart (1975) | Peak position |
|---|---|
| Billboard Top LPs | 151 |

Singles

| Year | Single | Chart | Position |
|---|---|---|---|
| 1975 | "Don't Tell Me Goodnight" | U.S. Billboard Hot 100 | 27 |
| 1975 | "Don't Tell Me Goodnight" | U.S. Billboard Easy Listening | 2 |
| 1975 | "Would I Still Have You" | U.S. Billboard Easy Listening | 44 |
