= List of number-one hits of 1973 (Germany) =

This is a list of the German Media Control Top100 Singles Chart number-ones of 1973.

Issue date	Song	Artist
5 January	"Ich Wünsch' mir 'ne Kleine Miezekatze"	Wums Gesang
12 January	"Ich Wünsch' mir 'ne Kleine Miezekatze"	Wums Gesang
19 January	"Ich Wünsch' mir 'ne Kleine Miezekatze"	Wums Gesang
26 January	"Ich Wünsch' mir 'ne Kleine Miezekatze"	Wums Gesang
2 February	"Ich Wünsch' mir 'ne Kleine Miezekatze"	Wums Gesang
9 February	"Ich Wünsch' mir 'ne Kleine Miezekatze"	Wums Gesang
16 February	"Ich Wünsch' mir 'ne Kleine Miezekatze"	Wums Gesang
23 February	"Blockbuster"	Sweet
2 March	"Blockbuster"	Sweet
9 March	"Blockbuster"	Sweet
15 March	"Mama Loo"	Les Humphries Singers
23 March	"Mama Loo"	Les Humphries Singers
30 March	"Blockbuster"	Sweet
6 April	"Mama Loo"	Les Humphries Singers
13 April	"Der Junge mit der Mundharmonika"	Bernd Clüver
20 April	"Der Junge mit der Mundharmonika"	Bernd Clüver
27 April	"Der Junge mit der Mundharmonika"	Bernd Clüver
4 May	"Der Junge mit der Mundharmonika"	Bernd Clüver
11 May	"Get Down"	Gilbert O'Sullivan
18 May	"Get Down"	Gilbert O'Sullivan
25 May	"Get Down"	Gilbert O'Sullivan
1 June	"Get Down"	Gilbert O'Sullivan
8 June	"Get Down"	Gilbert O'Sullivan
15 June	"Get Down"	Gilbert O'Sullivan
22 June	"Get Down"	Gilbert O'Sullivan
29 June	"Get Down"	Gilbert O'Sullivan
6 July	"Get Down"	Gilbert O'Sullivan
13 July	"Get Down"	Gilbert O'Sullivan
20 July	"Hell Raiser"	Sweet
27 July	"Hell Raiser"	Sweet
3 August	"Goodbye, My Love, Goodbye"	Demis Roussos
10 August	"Can the Can"	Suzi Quatro
17 August	"Can the Can"	Suzi Quatro
24 August	"Can the Can"	Suzi Quatro
31 August	"Can the Can"	Suzi Quatro
7 September	"Can the Can"	Suzi Quatro
14 September	"Can the Can"	Suzi Quatro
21 September	"Can the Can"	Suzi Quatro
28 September	"Can the Can"	Suzi Quatro
5 October	"Der Kleine Prinz"	Bernd Clüver
12 October	"Der Kleine Prinz"	Bernd Clüver
19 October	"The Ballroom Blitz"	Sweet
26 October	"Der Kleine Prinz"	Bernd Clüver
2 November	"I'd Love You to Want Me"	Lobo
9 November	"Der Kleine Prinz"	Bernd Clüver
16 November	"I'd Love You to Want Me"	Lobo
23 November	"I'd Love You to Want Me"	Lobo
30 November	"I'd Love You to Want Me"	Lobo
7 December	"I'd Love You to Want Me"	Lobo
14 December	"I'd Love You to Want Me"	Lobo
21 December	"I'd Love You to Want Me"	Lobo
28 December	"I'd Love You to Want Me"	Lobo

== See also ==
- List of number-one hits (Germany)
