= Me and You and a Dog Named Boo =

Single by Lobo

from the album Introducing Lobo
- B-side: "Walk Away from It All"
- Released: March 1971
- Studio: Electric Lady Studios
- Genre: Soft rock; pop; country; bubblegum
- Length: 2:53
- Label: Big Tree; 112
- Songwriter: Kent LaVoie
- Producer: Phil Gernhard

Lobo singles chronology
"Me and You and a Dog Named Boo" (1971)	"She Didn't Do Magic/I'm the Only One" (1971)

"Me and You and a Dog Named Boo" is the 1971 debut single by Lobo. Written by Lobo under his real name Kent LaVoie, it appears on the Introducing Lobo album.

== Composition ==
Lobo recalls: "I was working on several songs, including a tune about traveling around the country with this girl, and I was trying to rhyme 'you and me.' Now 'me and you' would have been easier, but I was trying to do it with proper grammar. I couldn’t find anything to rhyme that fit what I wanted to say in the song. Finally, after I got back home to Florida, I decided to turn the phrase around to 'me and you.' I was thinking about it, sitting in a room that had a big sliding glass door overlooking the back yard. My big German Shepherd dog: Boo, came running around the corner and looked in at me. I said: 'Well, now, that’s kinda freaky. How about putting 'a dog named Boo’ into the song?” That’s literally how it came about. All of a sudden the song really started coming together. I hadn’t been to any of the places mentioned in the song except Georgia, but I just kept putting in places that sounded far away like Minneapolis and L.A."

== Impact ==
The single peaked at number 5 on the Hot 100 and was the first of four of his songs to hit number 1 on the Easy Listening chart, where it had a two-week stay at that top spot in May 1971. The song also reached number 4 in the UK Singles Chart in July 1971 and spent four weeks at number 1 in New Zealand.

Internationally, "Me and You and a Dog Named Boo" was Lobo's second most successful song among more than 15 single releases, surpassed only by "I'd Love You to Want Me" the following year.

== Chart history ==
=== Weekly charts ===
Chart (1971)	Peak position
Australia KMR	8
Canada Adult Contemporary (RPM)	6
Canada Top Singles (RPM)	6
Ireland (IRMA)	6
New Zealand (Listener)	1
South Africa (Springbok)	6
UK Singles (Official Charts)	4
US Billboard Hot 100	5
US Adult Contemporary (Billboard)	1
US Cash Box Top 100	8

=== Year-end charts ===
Chart (1971)	Rank
Australia	65
Canada	98
UK	43
US Billboard Hot 100	59
US Cash Box	94

== Certifications ==
Certifications
Region	Certification	Certified units/sales
New Zealand (RMNZ)	Gold	15,000^{‡}
^{‡} Sales+streaming figures based on certification alone.

== Cover versions ==
- Later in 1971, country artist Stonewall Jackson recorded the song, which was his final Top 40 hit on the US country chart, peaking at number 7.
- Perry Como recorded the song for his 1971 album I Think of You.
- In 1972, a version was sung by The Brady Kids in the episode "Who Was That Dog...?" on their Saturday morning cartoon show.
- Agnes Chan recorded the song for her 1972 album Original I (A New Beginning).

== See also ==
- List of number-one adult contemporary singles of 1971 (U.S.)
- List of number-one singles in 1971 (New Zealand)
