= Jim Stafford (album) =

Studio album by Jim Stafford
- Released: February 5, 1974
- Length: 36:15
- Label: MGM
- Producers: Phil Gernhard and Lobo

Jim Stafford chronology
Jim Stafford (1974)	Not Just Another Pretty Foot (1975)

Professional ratings
Review scores
Source	Rating
AllMusic	3.5/5 stars
Christgau's Record Guide	B+

Jim Stafford is the 1974 debut album from American singer Jim Stafford. It was issued subsequent to the release of the first two singles. The LP reached No. 55 on the U.S. Top LPs chart. On the country chart, it peaked at No. 6.

The LP features four songs which became top 40 hits in the United States: "Swamp Witch" (#39 Billboard, #31 Cash Box), "Spiders & Snakes" (#3), "My Girl Bill" (#12), and "Wildwood Weed" (#7). All but the first were higher-charting hits in Canada, as was the album itself (#48).

== Track listing ==
Side one

1. "L.A. Mamma" (Jim Stafford) – 2:24
2. "I Ain't Sharin' Sharon" (Jim Stafford) – 2:14
3. Medley : "Mr. Bojangles" (Jerry Jeff Walker) / "A Visit with an Old Friend" (Jim Stafford) – 5:10
4. "Wildwood Weed" – 2:41 (Don Bowman)
5. "16 Little Red Noses and a Horse That Sweats" (Jim Stafford) – 3:54
6. "Spiders & Snakes" – 3:07 (Jim Stafford, David Bellamy)

Side two

1. "The Last Chant" (Jim Stafford) – 3:19
2. "My Girl Bill" – 3:13 (Jim Stafford)
3. "Nifty Fifties Blues" (Jim Stafford) – 3:03
4. "A Real Good Time" (Jim Stafford/Martin Cooper) – 3:33
5. "Swamp Witch" – 3:48 (Jim Stafford)

== Personnel ==
- Congas - Alan Estes
- Keyboards, Synthesizer - Alan Lindgren
- Composer - David Bellamy
- Design - David Larkham
- Drums - Dennis St. John
- Trombone - Dick Hyde
- Composer - Don Bowman
- Original Photography - Ed Caraeff
- Arranger, Bass, String Arrangements - Emory Gordy Jr.
- Guest Artist - Gallagher
- Mastering, Remixing - Gary N. Mayo
- Composer - Jerry Jeff Walker
- Banjo, Composer, Guitar, Acoustic Guitar, Harmonica, Primary Artist - Jim Stafford
- Arranger, String Arrangements - John Abbott
- Producer - Lobo
- Composer - Martin Cooper
- Engineer - Michael Lietz
- Package Redesign - Paul Bevoir
- Arranger, Producer, String Arrangements - Phil Gernhard
- Guitar, Acoustic Guitar, Electric Guitar - Richard Bennett
- Acoustic Guitar, Electric Guitar - Richard Rodney Bennett
- Productive Service - Tony Scotti

== Charts ==
Chart (1974)	Peak position
US Top LPs & Tape (Billboard)	55
US Country LPs (Billboard)	6
Australia (Kent Music Report)	27
Canadian Albums Chart	48
