= List of number-one singles in 1971 (New Zealand) =

This is a list of Number 1 hit singles in 1971 in New Zealand, starting with the first chart dated, 15 January 1971.

== Chart ==
Key
‡ – Single of New Zealand origin

Week	Artist	Title
1 January 1971	Summer break - no chart	Summer break - no chart
8 January 1971	Summer break - no chart	Summer break - no chart
15 January 1971	The New Seekers	"What Have They Done to My Song Ma"
22 January 1971	The New Seekers	"What Have They Done to My Song Ma"
29 January 1971	George Harrison	"My Sweet Lord"
5 February 1971	George Harrison	"My Sweet Lord"
12 February 1971	George Harrison	"My Sweet Lord"
21 February 1971	George Harrison	"My Sweet Lord"
26 February 1971	Tony Orlando & Dawn	"Knock Three Times"
5 March 1971	Tony Orlando & Dawn	"Knock Three Times"
12 March 1971	Mike Curb Congregation	"Burning Bridges"
19 March 1971	Mike Curb Congregation	"Burning Bridges"
26 March 1971	Lynn Anderson	"(I Never Promised You a) Rose Garden"
2 April 1971	Lynn Anderson	"(I Never Promised You a) Rose Garden"
9 April 1971	Lynn Anderson	"(I Never Promised You a) Rose Garden"
16 April 1971	The Mixtures	"The Pushbike Song"
23 April 1971	The Mixtures	"The Pushbike Song"
30 April 1971	The Hollies	"Too Young To Be Married"
7 May 1971	The Hollies	"Too Young To Be Married"
14 May 1971	The Hollies	"Too Young To Be Married"
21 May 1971	The Hollies	"Too Young To Be Married"
28 May 1971	Neil Diamond	"I Am... I Said"
4 June 1971	Neil Diamond	"I Am... I Said"
11 June 1971	Neil Diamond	"I Am... I Said"
19 June 1971	Neil Diamond	"I Am... I Said"
26 June 1971	Neil Diamond	"I Am... I Said"
2 July 1971	Neil Diamond	"I Am... I Said"
9 July 1971	Waldo De Los Rios	"Mozart 40"
16 July 1971	Ocean	"Put Your Hand in the Hand"
23 July 1971	Lobo	"Me and You and a Dog Named Boo"
30 July 1971	Lobo	"Me and You and a Dog Named Boo"
6 August 1971	Lobo	"Me and You and a Dog Named Boo"
13 August 1971	Lobo	"Me and You and a Dog Named Boo"
20 August 1971	Susan Raye	"L.A. International Airport"
27 August 1971	Tony Christie	"I Did What I Did for Maria"
3 September 1971	Tony Christie	"I Did What I Did for Maria"
10 September 1971	Susan Raye	"L.A. International Airport"
17 September 1971	Tony Christie	"I Did What I Did for Maria"
24 September 1971	Tony Christie	"I Did What I Did for Maria"
1 October 1971	Delaney, Bonnie & Friends	"Neverending Song of Love"
8 October 1971	Delaney, Bonnie & Friends	"Neverending Song of Love"
15 October 1971	Delaney, Bonnie & Friends	"Neverending Song of Love"
22 October 1971	Rumour	"L'Amour est l'Enfante de la Liberte"^{‡}
29 October 1971	Rumour	"L'Amour est l'Enfante de la Liberte"^{‡}
5 November 1971	Rumour	"L'Amour est l'Enfante de la Liberte"^{‡}
12 November 1971	Rumour	"L'Amour est l'Enfante de la Liberte"^{‡}
19 November 1971	Paul & Linda McCartney	"Uncle Albert/Admiral Halsey"
26 November 1971	Paul & Linda McCartney	"Uncle Albert/Admiral Halsey"
3 December 1971	Paul & Linda McCartney	"Uncle Albert/Admiral Halsey"
10 December 1971	Paul & Linda McCartney	"Uncle Albert/Admiral Halsey"
17 December 1971	Paul & Linda McCartney	"Uncle Albert/Admiral Halsey"
24 December 1971	Paul & Linda McCartney	"Uncle Albert/Admiral Halsey"
31 December 1971	Paul & Linda McCartney	"Uncle Albert/Admiral Halsey"
