= My Girl Bill =

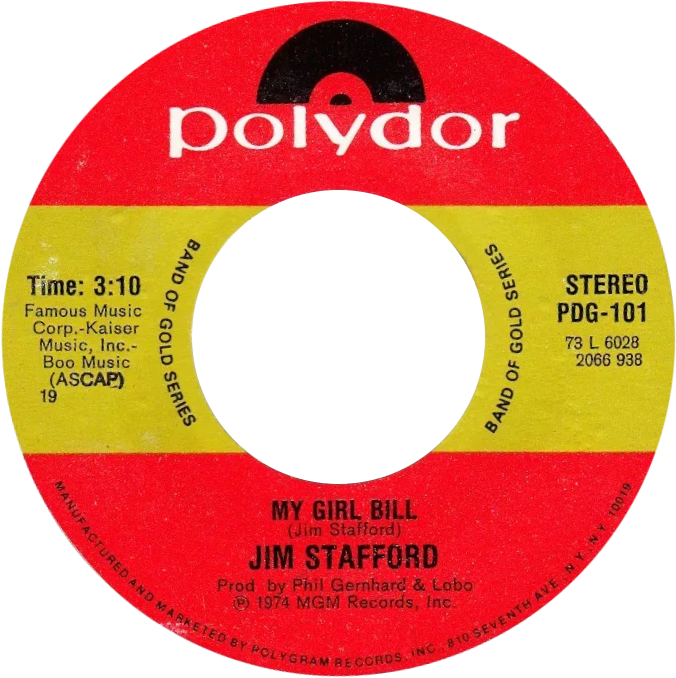
- US reissue (Polydor)

Single by Jim Stafford

from the album Jim Stafford
- B-side: "L.A. Mamma"
- Released: April 1974
- Length: 3:12
- Label: MGM Records
- Songwriter: Jim Stafford
- Producers: Phil Gernhard and Lobo

Jim Stafford singles chronology
"Spiders & Snakes" (1973)	"My Girl Bill" (1974)	"Wildwood Weed" (1974)

"My Girl Bill" is a 1974 hit song written and recorded by Jim Stafford. It was the third of four U.S. Top 40 singles from his eponymous debut album. The lyrics in the verses are spoken, rather than sung.

== Premise ==
The song is about a man named William/Bill and his friend, the narrator of the song. The lyrics employ double entendre, leading the listener to infer that the men, as the title also suggests, are themselves involved in a romantic relationship. However, in the last verse a twist occurs; the narrator speaks of a woman who has been the men's mutual love interest but who has now summarily rejected Bill, and he is explaining the situation (i.e. "(she's) MY girl, Bill").

== Chart performance ==
"My Girl Bill" reached number 12 on the U.S. Billboard Hot 100, number 7 on the Canadian pop singles chart and number 20 in the BBC UK Top 50 chart. It was a crossover hit onto the Adult Contemporary and Country charts of both nations. The song was also a Top 20 hit in Australia.

=== Weekly charts ===
Chart (1974)	Peak position
Australia (Kent Music Report)	12
Australia (Go-Set)	8
Canadian RPM Top Singles	7
Canadian RPM Adult Contemporary	18
Canadian Country	16
UK Singles Chart	20
US Billboard Hot 100	12
US Billboard Easy Listening	9
US Cashbox Top 100	10
US Country Singles	64

=== Year-end charts ===
Chart (1974)	Rank
Australia (Kent Music Report)	91
Canada	83
U.S. Billboard Hot 100	90

== Later uses ==
"My Girl Bill" was included on the 1975 Ronco compilation album, Far Out.

Actor Cash Backman covered the song in 1974. His version reached number nine in Australia in 1974 and was the 77th biggest-selling single of 1974, 14 places higher than Stafford's version.
