= Lobo (album) =

Studio album by Lobo
- Released: 1979
- Recorded: 1979
- Studio: Fame Recording Studios; Muscle Shoals Sound Studios
- Genre: Folk rock, soft rock
- Label: MCA
- Producer: Bob Montgomery

Lobo chronology
Come with Me (1976)	Lobo (1979)	Am I Going Crazy (1989)

Singles from Lobo
- 1. "Where Were You When I Was Falling in Love" Released: 1979; 2. "Holdin' On for Dear Love" Released: 1979

Lobo is the seventh album by Lobo and his only album on MCA Records, released in 1979.

The album failed to chart. "Where Were You When I Was Falling in Love" peaked at No. 23 on the Billboard Hot 100, becoming his final Top 40 hit to date. It also became his final No. 1 on the Adult Contemporary chart.

== Track listing ==
Side A
No.	Title	Writer(s)	Length
1.	"Where Were You When I Was Falling in Love"	Steve Jobe, Sam Lorber, Jeff Silbar	3:16
2.	"Spendin' Time, Makin' Love, and Goin' Crazy"	Mark Gray, Troy Seals, Eddie Setser	3:30
3.	"A Day in the Life of Love"	Larry Henley, Jim Hurt, Johnny Slate	3:44
4.	"Heart to Heart (Person to Person)"	Gray, Lorber, Silbar	3:31
5.	"It's Time to Face the Music and Dance"	Silbar, Slate	3:11

Side B
No.	Title	Writer(s)	Length
6.	"Holdin' On for Dear Love"	Henley, Steve Pippin, Slate	2:43
7.	"Lay Me Down"	Guy Fletcher, Doug Flett	3:12
8.	"I Don't Want to Make Love Anymore"	Kent LaVoie	3:27
9.	"The Way I Came In"	Kent LaVoie	4:12
10.	"Gus, the Dancing Dog"	Roger LaVoie	2:44

== Personnel ==
- Lobo – guitar, lead vocals
- Bob Ray – bass
- Mike Leech – bass
- Roger Clark – drums
- Ken Bell – guitar
- Larry Byrom – guitar
- Steve Nathan – keyboards
- Larry Keith, Lea Jane Berinati, Lisa Silver, Steve Pippin, Van Stephenson – backing vocals
- Ron Oates - string arrangements

Production

- Producer: Bob Montgomery
- Engineers: Don Dailey, Ernie Winfrey, Harold Lee, Travis Turk
- Photography: Paul Baker

== Charts ==
Singles

Year	Single	Chart	Position
1979	"Where Were You When I Was Falling in Love"	U.S. Billboard Hot 100	23
1979	"Where Were You When I Was Falling in Love"	U.S. Billboard Easy Listening	1
1979	"Holdin' On for Dear Love"	U.S. Billboard Hot 100	75
1979	"Holdin' On for Dear Love"	U.S. Billboard Easy Listening	13
