= Of a Simple Man =

Studio album by Lobo
- Released: October 1972
- Recorded: 1972
- Studios: Mastersound Studios, Atlanta, GA
- Genres: Folk rock, soft rock
- Label: Big Tree
- Producer: Phil Gernhard

Lobo chronology
Introducing Lobo (1971)	Of a Simple Man (1972)	Calumet (1973)

Singles from Of a Simple Man
- 1. "A Simple Man" Released: 1972; 2. "I'd Love You to Want Me" Released: 1972; 3. "Don't Expect Me to Be Your Friend" Released: 1972

Of a Simple Man is the second album by Lobo, released in 1972 on Big Tree Records.

It is Lobo's most popular album, peaking at #37 on the US Top LP chart. Two of its singles were Top 10 hits on the Billboard Hot 100 and chart toppers on the Easy Listening chart.

== Track listing ==
All songs are written by Kent LaVoie.

Side A
No.	Title	Length
1.	"Intro"	0:24
2.	"There Ain't No Way"	3:14
3.	"A Big Red Kite"	4:06
4.	"Recycle Sally"	3:10
5.	"Don't Expect Me to Be Your Friend"	3:38
6.	"A Simple Man"	3:05

Side B
No.	Title	Length
7.	"I'd Love You to Want Me"	4:04
8.	"Let Me Down Easy"	2:45
9.	"Pee-Ro Juan Valdez Sam Quixote"	4:04
10.	"Running Deer"	3:25
11.	"Gypsy And The Midnight Ghost"	3:08
12.	"Am I True To Myself"	3:33

== Personnel ==
Production

- Producer: Phil Gernhard
- Engineer: Bob Richardson
- Photography: Marion Moorman

Musicians

- [John Abbott - String Arrangements]
- [Phil Benton - Electric Guitars]
- [Steve Feldman - Keyboard/Congas/Vibes]
- [A. Michael Gatley - Vocal Harmonies]
- [Phil Gernhard - String Arrangements]
- [Ellie Greenwich - Vocal Harmonies]
- [Harwood. Barry - Electric Guitars]
- [Robert John - Vocal Harmonies]
- [Ben Lanzarone - Keyboard]
- [Kent "Lobo" LaVoie - Acoustical Guitars/Vocals/Vocal Harmonies/Electric Guitars/Keyboard]
- [George Marge - Flute/Recorder/Sax]
- [John Mulkey - Bass]
- [Barbara Sipple - Vocal Harmonies]
- [Steve Tadanger - Vocal Harmonies]
- [Thumpy - Australian Marching Drums]
- [Roy Yeager - Drums]

== Charts ==
Album

=== Weekly charts ===
Year	Chart	Position
1973	Billboard Top LPs	37
1973	Australia (Kent Music Report)	18
1973	Canada (RPM)	19

=== Year-end charts ===
Chart (1974)	Position
German Albums (Offizielle Top 100)	38

Singles

Year	Single	Chart	Position
1972	"A Simple Man"	U.S. Billboard Hot 100	56
1972	"A Simple Man"	U.S. Billboard Easy Listening	17
1972	"I'd Love You to Want Me"	U.S. Billboard Hot 100	2
1972	"I'd Love You to Want Me"	U.S. Billboard Easy Listening	1
1974	"I'd Love You to Want Me"	U.K.	5
1973	"Don't Expect Me to Be Your Friend"	U.S. Billboard Hot 100	8
1973	"Don't Expect Me to Be Your Friend"	U.S. Billboard Easy Listening	1
