= Don't Expect Me to Be Your Friend =

Single by Lobo

from the album Of a Simple Man
- B-side: "A Big Red Kite"; "Running Deer" (Japan)
- Released: June 1972 (original); December 16, 1972 (reissue)
- Genre: Soft rock
- Label: Big Tree; Philips (Japan)
- Songwriter: Kent LaVoie
- Producer: Phil Gernhard

Lobo singles chronology
| "I'd Love You to Want Me" (1972) | "Don't Expect Me to Be Your Friend" (1972) | "It Sure Took a Long, Long Time" (1973) |

"Don't Expect Me to Be Your Friend" is a song written and recorded by American singer Lobo that appears on his album Of a Simple Man. Released in 1972, the single peaked at No. 8 on the US Billboard Hot 100 and was his third of four songs to top the Billboard Easy Listening chart, where it had a two-week stay at No. 1. Internationally, it peaked at No. 4 in Australia, Canada, and New Zealand.

== Track listings ==
Standard 7-inch single

A. "Don't Expect Me to Be Your Friend" – 3:33
B. "A Big Red Kite" – 4:02

Japanese 7-inch single

A. "Don't Expect Me to Be Your Friend" – 3:38
B. "Running Deer" – 3:25

== Charts ==
=== Weekly charts ===
| Chart (1972–1973) | Peak position |
|---|---|
| Australia (Kent Music Report) | 4 |
| Canada Top Singles (RPM) | 4 |
| Canada Adult Contemporary (RPM) | 3 |
| New Zealand (Listener) | 4 |
| US Billboard Hot 100 | 8 |
| US Cashbox Top 100 | 4 |
| US Adult Contemporary (Billboard) | 1 |

=== Year-end charts ===
| Chart (1973) | Position |
|---|---|
| Canada Top Singles (RPM) | 53 |
| US Billboard Hot 100 | 87 |

== Cover versions ==
- Jamaican reggae singer Wayne Wade also recorded a reggae-tinged cover of this song, retitled "I Love You Too Much", in 1991.

== See also ==
- List of number-one adult contemporary singles of 1973 (U.S.)
