= Spiders & Snakes (song) =

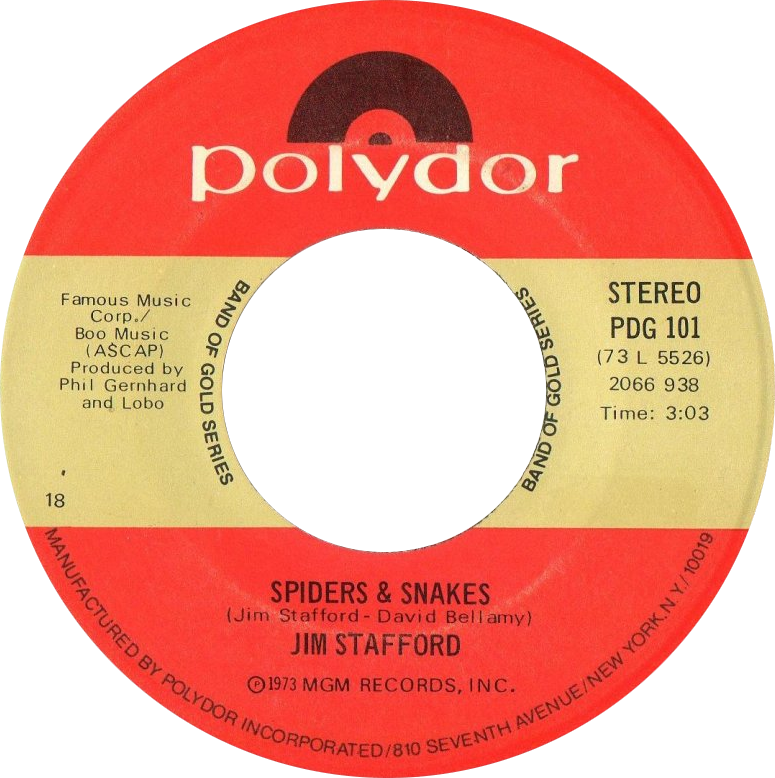
- One of side-A labels of the US reissue single

Single by Jim Stafford

from the album Jim Stafford
- B-side: "Undecided"
- Released: January 2, 1974
- Recorded: 1973
- Genre: Swamp rock
- Length: 3:07
- Label: MGM
- Songwriters: Jim Stafford, David Bellamy
- Producers: Phil Gernhard and Lobo

Jim Stafford singles chronology
"Swamp Witch" (1973)	"Spiders & Snakes" (1974)	"My Girl Bill" (1974)

Official audio
- "Spiders & Snakes" on YouTube

"Spiders & Snakes" is a 1974 hit song recorded by Jim Stafford and written by Stafford and David Bellamy of The Bellamy Brothers. It was the second of four U.S. Top 40 singles released from his eponymous debut album and also the highest-charting at number three. The lyrics in the verses are spoken, while only the chorus is sung.

== Lyrics ==
The song begins with the narrator being asked by a girl, Mary Lou, to walk her home from school, which he accepts. She says that she would like to spend some time alone together instead of going right home; the narrator agrees. They go to the swimming hole. While there, the narrator catches a frog on a hollow log. He shakes it at her saying "This frog's for you." Mary Lou informs him that she dislikes spiders and snakes. She adds that his actions are not the way to bring about a romantic response from her. After a while, the narrator phones her to get together again. She says that she'll see him after school. He is nervous this time, thinking of another scheme, when Mary Lou again tells him clearly of her dislike for spiders and snakes, reiterating the same unromantic reasons. (Source: Metro Lyrics)

== Commercial performance ==
"Spiders and Snakes" was a hit in 1974, spending one week at number three on the US Billboard Hot 100. In Canada, the song reached number one. The song spent five and a half months on the US charts, sold over one million copies, and was awarded a gold disc by the RIAA on March 8, 1974.

== Chart performance ==
=== Weekly charts ===
Chart (1973–1974)	Peak position
Australia (Kent Music Report)	19
Canadian RPM Top Singles	1
Canadian RPM Adult Contemporary	9
New Zealand (Listener)	16
UK	14
US Billboard Hot 100	3
US Billboard Adult Contemporary	28
US Country	66
US Cash Box Top 100	3

=== Year-end charts ===
Chart (1974)	Rank
Australia (Kent Music Report)	85
Canada RPM Top Singles	29
US Billboard Hot 100	16
US Cash Box Top 100	15

== Cover versions ==
- The Party covered the song for the soundtrack to the 1990 movie, Arachnophobia & was later included in their 1991 album In The Meantime, In Between Time
- Loretta Lynn and Conway Twitty included a cover of "Spiders & Snakes" on their 1974 album Country Partners.
