= I'd Love You to Want Me =

Single by Lobo

from the album Of a Simple Man
- B-side: "Am I True to Myself"
- Released: September 1972
- Genre: Folk rock, soft rock
- Length: 4:04
- Label: Big Tree Records, UK Records
- Songwriter: Roland Kent LaVoie (Lobo)
- Producer: Phil Gernhard

Lobo singles chronology
"A Simple Man" (1972)	"I'd Love You to Want Me" (1972)	"Don't Expect Me to Be Your Friend" (1972)

"I'd Love You to Want Me" is a song by American singer-songwriter Lobo. It was released in September 1972 as the second single from his second album Of a Simple Man.

The song was Lobo's highest-charting hit on the Billboard Hot 100 chart, where it spent two weeks at No. 2 in November. The single was the second of four of his songs to hit No. 1 on the Easy Listening chart, where it had a one-week stay at that top spot in December 1972. It became a gold record.

When released in the United Kingdom in 1972, the song failed to reach the UK Singles Chart; however, a re-release of the single in 1974, on the UK record label, peaked at No. 5.

The song also topped the music charts in at least seven nations, including Australia (Kent Music Report, two weeks), Canada (RPM Magazine, one week), and Germany (Media Control Charts, 13 weeks in 1973–1974).

== Cover versions ==
Many artists have covered the song. Among the most notable are the following:

- Dutch singer Dennis Jones (born Casper Janssen), covered it with Dutch lyrics titled "De Zon Die Zal Schijnen"; it stayed five weeks on the Dutch Single Top 100 chart in 2008, peaking at No. 48. The CD single also included a German version, "Du Bist Nicht Alleine", and a version of the original English version "I'd Love You to Want Me".
- Brazilian pop trio KLB released a Portuguese version of the song in 2000, titled "Ela Não Está Aqui".
- Dutch-Spanish singer Tony Ronald released a cover and also a Spanish version of the song, titled "Tú Sabes Que Te Amo".
- Swedish pop band Friends released a cover of the song in 2001 on their album "Listen to Your Heartbeat".
- In 2026 the YouTube channel PROJETO ECLIPTICA released a dance version of the song.

== Charts ==
=== Weekly charts ===
Chart (1972–74)	Peak position
Australia (KMR)	1
Austria (Ö3 Austria Top 40)	1
Belgium (Ultratop 50 Wallonia)	50
Brazil (IBOPE)	3
Canada Top Singles (RPM)	1
Denmark Singles Chart	5
France (IFOP)	10
Hong Kong (Radio Hong Kong)	1
Ireland (IRMA)	7
Italy (Musica e dischi)	8
Malaysia (Rediffusion)	6
Mexico (Billboard)	7
New Zealand (Listener)	1
Puerto Rico (Billboard)	35
Singapore (Rediffusion)	1
South Africa Top 20	1
Spain (AFYVE)	6
Sweden (Kvällstoppen)	16
Switzerland (Schweizer Hitparade)	1
UK Singles (Official Charts)	5
US Billboard Hot 100	2
US Adult Contemporary (Billboard)	1
US Cash Box Top 100	1
West Germany (GfK)	1
Zimbabwe (ZIMA)	1

=== Year-end charts ===
Chart (1972)	Rank
Canada Top Singles (RPM)	32

Chart (1973)	Rank
Australia	8
South Africa	4

Chart (1974)	Rank
Switzerland	9

== See also ==
- List of number-one singles in Australia during the 1970s
- List of RPM number-one singles of 1972
- List of number-one hits of 1973 and 1974 (Germany)
- List of number-one adult contemporary singles of 1972 (U.S.)
