= Just a Singer =

Studio album by Lobo
- Released: June 1974
- Recorded: 1974
- Studios: Mastersound Studios; Producers Workshop
- Genres: Folk rock, soft rock
- Label: Big Tree Records
- Producer: Phil Gernhard

Lobo chronology
Calumet (1973)	Just a Singer (1974)	A Cowboy Afraid of Horses (1975)

Singles from Just a Singer
- 1. "Rings" Released: 1974

Just a Singer is the fourth album by Lobo, released in 1974 on Big Tree Records. The album, along with A Cowboy Afraid of Horses, was reissued in 1997 by Rhino Records as a single issue. It contains covers of various hit songs.

The album peaked at No. 183 on the US Top LPs chart. Its only single "Rings" narrowly missed the Top 40 on the Billboard Hot 100, peaking at No. 43, but it was a top 10 hit on the Easy Listening chart, peaking at No. 8.

== Track listing ==
Side A
No.	Title	Writer(s)	Length
1.	"Rings"	Harvey, Reeves	3:24
2.	"The Shelter of Your Eyes"	Williams	2:32
3.	"I'm Only Sleeping"	Lennon, McCartney	2:15
4.	"Daydream Believer"	Stewart	3:31
5.	"Reason to Believe"	Hardin	3:27

Side B
No.	Title	Writer(s)	Length
6.	"Armstrong"	Stewart	2:37
7.	"Universal Soldier"	Sainte-Marie	3:15
8.	"Let's Get Together"	Powers	4:43
9.	"Lodi"	Fogerty	3:26
10.	"All For The Love Of A Girl"	Horton	2:29

== Personnel ==
- Lobo - guitar, lead vocals
- Emory Gordy Jr. - bass
- Dennis St. John - drums
- Richard Bennett - guitar
- Alan Lindgren - keyboards

Production

- Producer: Phil Gernhard
- Engineer: Michael Lietz

== Charts ==
Album

Chart (1974)	Peak position
Billboard Top LPs	183

Singles

Year	Single	Chart	Position
1974	"Rings"	U.S. Billboard Hot 100	43
1974	"Rings"	U.S. Billboard Easy Listening	8
