= Calumet (album) =

Studio album by Lobo
- Released: 1973
- Recorded: 1973
- Studios: Mastersound Studios, Atlanta, GA
- Genres: Folk rock, soft rock
- Label: Big Tree
- Producer: Phil Gernhard

Lobo chronology
Of a Simple Man (1972)	Calumet (1973)	Just a Singer (1974)

Singles from Calumet
- 1. "It Sure Took a Long, Long Time" Released: 1973; 2. "How Can I Tell Her" Released: 1973; 3. "There Ain't No Way" Released: 1973; 4. "Standing at the End of the Line" Released: 1974

Calumet is the third studio album by American singer-songwriter Lobo, released in 1973 on Big Tree Records. It was reissued in 2008 by Wounded Bird Records and includes six bonus tracks.

The album peaked at No. 128 on the US Top LPs chart. Two of its singles were top 30 hits on the Billboard Hot 100 and top 5 hits on the Easy Listening chart. "There Ain't No Way" and its B-side "Love Me For What I Am" were minor hits on the Hot 100.

== Track listing ==
All songs are written by Kent LaVoie.

Side A
No.	Title	Length
1.	"How Can I Tell Her"	4:17
2.	"Stoney"	3:43
3.	"Rock And Roll Days"	3:58
4.	"One and the Same Thing"	4:01
5.	"Hope You're Proud Of Me Girl"	3:00

Side B
No.	Title	Length
6.	"Love Me For What I Am"	4:02
7.	"Try"	3:10
8.	"It Sure Took a Long, Long Time"	3:06
9.	"Standing at the End of the Line"	3:53
10.	"Goodbye Is Just Another Word"	3:34

Bonus tracks (2008 reissue)
No.	Title	Length
11.	"Suzann"	2:20
12.	"Stoney" (Early Version)	3:31
13.	"Cecil Jones"	2:37
14.	"A Simple Man" (Single Version)	3:00
15.	"How Can I Tell Her" (Early Mix)	4:42
16.	"Don't Expect Me To Be Your Friend" (Single Version)	3:35

== Personnel ==
- Lobo – guitar, lead vocals
- Roy Yeager – drums, percussion
- Barry Harwood – guitar
- Jim Ellis – keyboards

Production

- Producer: Phil Gernhard
- Photography: Ed Caraeff

== Charts ==
Album

Chart (1973)	Peak position
Billboard Top LPs	128

Singles

Year	Single	Chart	Position
1973	"It Sure Took a Long, Long Time"	U.S. Billboard Hot 100	27
1973	"It Sure Took a Long, Long Time"	U.S. Billboard Easy Listening	3
1973	"How Can I Tell Her"	U.S. Billboard Hot 100	22
1973	"How Can I Tell Her"	U.S. Billboard Easy Listening	4
1973	"There Ain't No Way"	U.S. Billboard Hot 100	68
1973	"There Ain't No Way"	U.S. Billboard Hot 100	86 (Note: Chart peak of Love Me For What I Am, the B-side of There Ain't No Way.)
1973	"There Ain't No Way"	U.S. Billboard Easy Listening	29
1974	"Standing At The End Of The Line"	U.S. Billboard Hot 100	37
1974	"Standing At The End Of The Line"	U.S. Billboard Easy Listening	25
