= Rings (song) =

1971 soft rock song

Single by Cymarron

from the album Rings
- B-side: "Like Children"
- Released: April 22, 1971
- Genre: Soft rock
- Length: 2:45
- Label: Entrance / Columbia
- Composer: Alex Harvey
- Lyricist: Eddie Reeves
- Producer: Chips Moman

"Rings" is a soft rock song which in 1971 became a top 20 U.S. Pop hit for the Memphis band Cymarron and also peaked at number 66 in Australia. It was a top 10 C&W hit for Tompall & the Glaser Brothers.

== Composition/initial recordings ==
"Rings" was composed by Eddie Reeves, who headed the West Coast office of United Artists Music, and Alex Harvey who was contracted to United Artists Music. The song was written for the wedding of a friend of Reeves named Bob Hamilton who - as the song's lyrics indicate - had experienced an estrangement and reconciliation with his fiancée: the song concludes with the couple "hand in hand...upon the sand with the preacher man" - a reference to Hamilton and his bride's exchanging vows on the Venice beachfront. The lyric: "Got James Taylor on the stereo", was a reference to James Taylor's "Fire and Rain" being the couple's favorite song - while the "Tony and Mario" mentioned in the song were the owners of a Hollywood restaurant the couple frequented.

Besides Alex Harvey, Eddie Reeves recruited Mac Davis to co-write the song but ultimately Davis was unavailable for the songwriting session. "Rings" was written at Harvey's Hollywood apartment where Reeves at the piano began playing the C-F-G chord progression of a song Harvey had previously written causing Harvey to opine that the same progression be used for the new song. Reeves had already explained his idea of using the word "ring[s]" in different connotations throughout the song to Harvey who quickly came up with a first verse lyric after which Reeves quickly came up with a second verse: after a break to eat their TV dinners the two composers then contributed alternate lines to the third and final verse. As planned Reeves and Harvey introduced "Rings" at the wedding reception brunch which followed the beachfront ceremony, Harvey singing to his own guitar accompaniment with Reeves harmonizing on the second part of each verse, with the song's composers obliging several encore requests throughout the day's festivities.

Soon afterwards Reeves and Harvey made a recording of the song at the end of a demo recording session booked for Harvey at Quantum Sound Studio in Torrance: although there was reportedly no original intent other than gifting the newlyweds with the recording a demo copy was heard by singer-songwriter Mike Settle who instigated the first full recording of "Rings" by a session group helmed by himself and the song's two writers with Harvey singing lead, the track being credited to Running Bear and Goldstein. Having little faith in the prospects for the Running Bear and Goldstein version of "Rings", Reeves had no reservations about pitching the song to the producer of Lonnie Mack for whom the song was optioned with Mack recording "Rings" for his 1971 album The Hills of Indiana.

== Cymarron version ==
At around the time of the Lonnie Mack recording, Bob Hamilton, whose wedding had generated the song, played "Rings" for Memphis Mafioso Marty Lacker through whom the song reached Chips Moman, founder of the legendary Memphis recording studio American Sound. Moman recorded the song with a trio of American Sound session musicians he had recently signed to record as Cymarron whose lead singer Richard Mainegra would recall: "We weren't exactly thrilled with it. The demo was really country-soundin' and slow and we were writin' our own stuff and soundin' a lot more Eagles-ish. But [Moman] told us to go upstairs and work it up the way we'd be happy with it. So we changed a chord or two and livened it up a bit."

According to Eddie Reeves: "The Cymarron record was rush released and received strong immediate airplay, some of which came from major markets radio stations programmed by some of the attendees of Bob Hamilton's wedding. [Also] Bob was in the business of consulting many radio stations and he was not shy about touting the attributes of his...wedding song." "Rings" debuted at number 84 on June 12, 1971 and peaked at number 17 on the Billboard Hot 100 on August 14, 1971, its peak on the magazine's Easy Listening chart being number 6. The song would serve as the title cut for Cymarron's sole album, also released in 1971.

"Rings" also afforded Cymarron a chart hit in Canada (number 41), Australia (number 46) and the Netherlands (number 28).

== Tompall & the Glaser Brothers version ==
Tompall & the Glaser Brothers recorded "Rings" in a June 1971 session at Glaser Sound Studios in Nashville: reaching number 7 C&W the track was included on the 1972 album release Rings & Things. This version adjusted the line: "Got James Taylor on the stereo" to "Got Merle Haggard..."

=== Chart performance ===
Chart (1971)	Peak position
U.S. Record World Country	1
U.S. Cash Box Country	5
U.S. Billboard Hot Country Singles	7
Canadian RPM Country Tracks	21

== 1974 versions ==
In the summer of 1974, a recording of "Rings" by Lobo, taken from his album of remakes Just a Singer, reached number 43 on the Billboard Hot 100, besting a concurrent remake by Reuben Howell — taken from the Motown album release Rings cut at Muscle Shoals — which reached number 86. In Canada, the Lobo version charted at number 30. The Lobo version subbed "the Allman Brothers" for the original's "James Taylor" reference, which in Howell's version had been adjusted to "Jim Croce".

== Other versions ==
- The song's co-writer Alex Harvey recorded "Rings" for his 1972 album Souvenirs.
- Nina & Mike (de) recorded the song as "Ring Ring" with lyrics in German for the duo's 1973 album Rund um die welt mit Nina & Mike.
- Twiggy remade "Rings" for the 1977 album Please Get My Name Right (UK number 35).
- Dr. Hook had a 1982 European single release with a remake of "Rings".
- Leo Kottke recorded "Rings" for his 1983 album Time Step.
