= How Can I Tell Her =

Single by Lobo

from the album Calumet
- B-side: "Hope You're So Proud of Me Girl"
- Released: 1973
- Recorded: 1973
- Genre: Soft rock
- Length: 4:20
- Label: Big Tree
- Songwriter(s): Lobo
- Producer(s): Phil Gernhard

Lobo singles chronology
"It Sure Took a Long, Long Time" (1973)	"How Can I Tell Her" (1973)	"There Ain't No Way" (1973)

"How Can I Tell Her" is a song by American singer-songwriter Lobo, from his third studio album Calumet. The song reached No. 22 on the US Billboard Hot 100 and No. 4 on the Adult Contemporary chart.
