= Wildwood Weed =

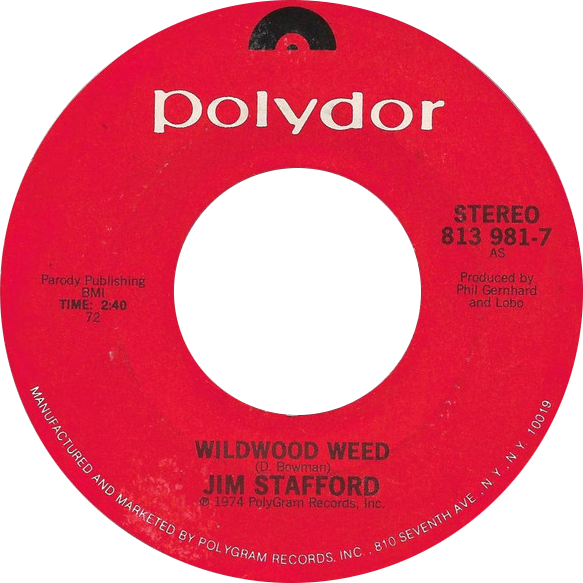
- One of US reissues (Polydor)

Single by Jim Stafford

from the album Jim Stafford
- B-side: "The Last Chant"
- Released: July 1974
- Length: 2:38
- Label: MGM Records
- Songwriter: Don Bowman
- Producers: Phil Gernhard and Lobo

Jim Stafford singles chronology
"My Girl Bill" (1974)	"Wildwood Weed" (1974)	"Your Bulldog Drinks Champagne" (1974)

"Wildwood Weed" is a 1964 country-western parody song written by Don Bowman. It was the first track of Bowman's debut album, Our Man in Trouble..."It Only Hurts When I Laugh", under RCA Victor. Its most famous version was recorded in 1974 by Jim Stafford and became the fourth of four U.S. Top 40 singles from his eponymous debut album. Musically, the song takes its inspiration from the Carter Family's recording "Wildwood Flower". While the Carters' version is a song, as performed by Bowman, Stafford and The New Lost City Ramblers in concert, the new lyrics are spoken rather than sung.

== Background ==
The song is a story about farmers, two brothers, who take a sudden interest in a common wildflower on their farm and discover, after one of them begins chewing a piece, its enjoyable hallucinogenic and mind-altering properties. They begin to cultivate the plant in earnest; however, federal agents raid their farm and destroy their crop. Nevertheless, the men are unfazed because they have saved a supply of seeds, overlooked by the agents. Despite the song's popularity, some AM radio stations banned it because of the references to marijuana.

== Chart performance ==
"Wildwood Weed" reached number seven on the U.S. Billboard Hot 100, number five on Cash Box and number three on the Canadian pop singles chart. It was a crossover hit onto the Adult Contemporary charts of both nations (reaching number two in Canada), as well as the U.S. Country chart.

=== Weekly charts ===
Chart (1974)	Peak position
Canadian RPM Top Singles	3
Canadian RPM Adult Contemporary	2
U.S. Billboard Hot 100	7
U.S. Billboard Adult Contemporary	29
U.S. Cashbox Top 100	5
U.S. Country	57

=== Year-end charts ===
Chart (1974)	Rank
Canada - RPM 100	55
U.S. Billboard Hot 100	93
U.S. Cash Box	92
