= Introducing Lobo =

Studio album by Lobo
- Released: April 1971
- Recorded: 1970
- Studios: Electric Lady, New York City
- Genres: Folk rock, soft rock
- Length: 32:17
- Label: Big Tree
- Producer: Phil Gernhard

Lobo chronology
Introducing Lobo (1971)	Of a Simple Man (1972)

Singles from Introducing Lobo
- 1. "Me and You and a Dog Named Boo" Released: 1971; 2. "She Didn't Do Magic" Released: 1971; 3. "California Kid and Reemo" Released: 1971

Alternate Album Cover
- Cover for the 1973 release

Introducing Lobo is the debut album by Lobo, released in 1971 on Big Tree Records.

The album peaked at #178 on the Billboard 200 in its first release. It was re-released in 1973 and peaked at #163 on the same chart. "Me and You and a Dog Named Boo" peaked at #5 on the Billboard Hot 100, becoming his first top 40 hit. It also became his first #1 on the Adult Contemporary chart, staying on top for 2 consecutive weeks in May 1971.

== Track listing ==
Side A
No.	Title	Writer(s)	Length
1.	"Country Feelings" (Intro)	Bob Montgomery, Kenny O'Dell	0:53
2.	"Me and You and a Dog Named Boo" (A1)	Kent LaVoie	2:57
3.	"The Albatross" (A2)	Dick Holler	3:07
4.	"We'll Make It....I Know We Will" (A3)	LaVoie	2:53
5.	"A Little Different" (A4)	LaVoie	3:00
6.	"Reaching Out For Someone" (A5)	Holler	3:06
Total length:			15:56

Side B
No.	Title	Writer(s)	Length
7.	"She Didn't Do Magic" (B1)	LaVoie	2:52
8.	"Little Joe (They're Out To Get Ya)" (B2)	Holler	3:13
9.	"I'm The Only One" (B3)	LaVoie	3:17
10.	"We'll Be One By Two Today" (B4)	LaVoie, Michael Gately	3:20
11.	"Another Hill To Climb" (B5)	LaVoie	2:34
12.	"Country Feelings" (Reprise)	Montgomery, O'Dell	1:05
Total length:			16:21

== Personnel ==
Production

- Producer: Phil Gernhard
- Engineer: Ron Johnson
- Photography: Ernest Braun

== Charts ==
Album

Year	Chart	Position
1971	Billboard Top LPs	178
1971	Cash Box	119
1971	Canada (RPM)	92
1973	Billboard Top LPs	163
1973	Cash Box	170

Singles

Year	Single	Chart	Position
1971	"Me and You and a Dog Named Boo"	U.S. Billboard Hot 100	5
1971	"Me and You and a Dog Named Boo"	U.S. Billboard Easy Listening	4
1971	"Me and You and a Dog Named Boo"	U.K.	1
1971	"She Didn't Do Magic"	U.S. Billboard Hot 100	46
1971	"She Didn't Do Magic"	U.S. Billboard Easy Listening	14 (Note: Chart peak of I'm The Only One, the B-side of She Didn't Do Magic.)
1971	"She Didn't Do Magic"	U.S. Cash Box	76
1971	"California Kid and Reemo"	U.S. Billboard Hot 100	72
1971	"California Kid and Reemo"	U.S. Billboard Easy Listening	19
