= Where Were You When I Was Falling in Love =

Single by Lobo

from the album Lobo
- B-side: "I Don't Wanna Make Love Anymore"
- Released: July 1979
- Genre: Soft rock
- Length: 3:16
- Label: MCA
- Songwriters: Sam Lorber; Jeff Silbar; Steve Jobe
- Producer: Bob Montgomery

Lobo singles chronology
"You're All I Ever Need" (1977)	"Where Were You When I Was Falling in Love" (1979)	"Holdin' On for Dear Love" (1979)

"Where Were You When I Was Falling in Love" is a popular song written by Jeff Silbar, Sam Lorber and Steve Jobe. It was a hit for singer Lobo and was released as a single in 1979 from his self-titled album.

The song was Lobo's final top 40 hit on the Billboard Hot 100, where it peaked at No. 23, and his fourth and final No. 1 song on the Adult Contemporary chart, which it topped for two weeks in September/October 1979.

== Chart history ==
Chart (1979)	Peak position
Australia (Kent Music Report)	41
Canada RPM Top Singles	67
Canada RPM Adult Contemporary	35
U.S. Billboard Hot 100	23
U.S. Billboard Adult Contemporary	1
U.S. Cash Box Top 100	16

== See also ==
- List of number-one adult contemporary singles of 1979 (U.S.)
