= Jim Stafford =

American singer, songwriter, musician, and comedian (born 1944)

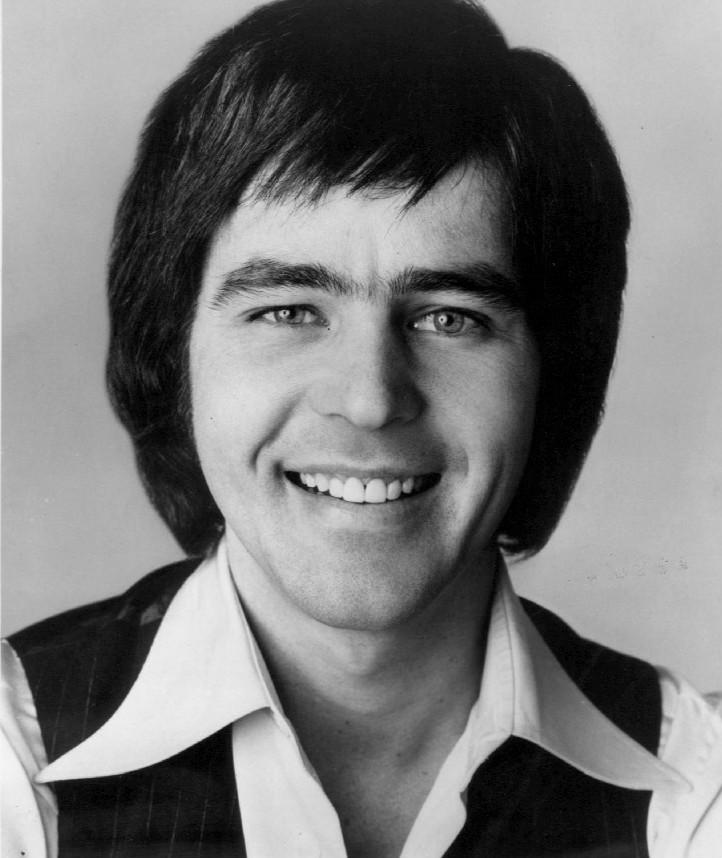
- Stafford in 1975

Background information
- Born: James Wayne Stafford; January 16, 1944 (age 82); Winter Haven, Florida, U.S.
- Genre: Country
- Occupations: Singer; songwriter; musician; comedian
- Instruments: Vocals; guitar; fiddle; piano; banjo; harmonica
- Years active: 1974–present

James Wayne Stafford (born January 16, 1944) is an American singer, songwriter, musician, and comedian. While prominent in the 1970s for his recordings "Spiders & Snakes", "Swamp Witch", "Under the Scotsman's Kilt", "My Girl Bill", and "Wildwood Weed", Stafford headlined at his own theater in Branson, Missouri, from 1990 to 2020. Stafford is self-taught on guitar, fiddle, piano, banjo, organ, and harmonica.

== Early years ==
Stafford was raised in Winter Haven, Florida. In high school, he played in a band called the Legends, along with friends Bobby Braddock, Kent LaVoie (also known as Lobo) and Gram Parsons (of the Byrds and The Flying Burrito Brothers).

== Career ==
=== Recording history ===
Stafford's first chart hit was "Swamp Witch", produced by Lobo, which cracked the U.S. top 40 in July 1973. On March 2, 1974, his biggest hit, "Spiders & Snakes", peaked at number three on the Billboard Hot 100 and number 14 in the BBC Top 50 in the UK, selling over two million copies, earning a gold disc by the RIAA that month. Stafford continued to have moderate chart success through most of 1975 with an additional minor hit called "My Girl Bill" which reached number 20 in the BBC Top 50 chart a year earlier in 1974.

=== Television work ===
Stafford's first televised appearance was in 1974 on a show called Rock Concert that aired in the United Kingdom.

The Jim Stafford Show was a six-week summer variety series shown on ABC from July 30, 1975 to September 3, 1975. It featured Valerie Curtin, Richard Stahl, Deborah Allen, Cyndi Wood, and Gallagher, and was co-produced by Tony Scotti. Stafford, Rod Warren, April Kelly, and Pat Proft were among the writers on the series.

In 1976, Stafford guest-starred in two episodes of Gemini Man, which were later combined into a TV movie titled Riding with Death. He also guest-starred in the episode "The Understudy" on The Love Boat.

Stafford appeared numerous times on music specials, variety shows, and talk shows. He was a frequent guest on The Tonight Show. He co-hosted Those Amazing Animals with Burgess Meredith and Priscilla Presley, from 1980 to 1981, and also hosted 56 episodes of Nashville on the Road.

Stafford was credited with being the supervising writer for The Smothers Brothers Comedy Hour revival show, which aired on CBS in 1988.

=== Songwriting ===
Stafford contributed to several movie soundtracks. He received a gold record for his work on the Disney movie The Fox and the Hound. He wrote "Cow Patti" for the Clint Eastwood movie Any Which Way You Can and appeared in the movie. His work has been covered by George Jones and Jerry Reed. His second classical guitar album, Somewhere in Time, appeared in March 2002. His most recent comedy album was Don't Tell Mama I'm a Guitar Picker, She Thinks I'm Just in Jail. In 2010, he produced and recorded his first Christmas album, A Guitar for Christmas.

=== Live performances ===
Stafford operated and performed at the Jim Stafford Theatre in Branson, Missouri, beginning in 1990. His children, Sheaffer and GG, would accompany him on stage.

The theatre ceased performances in spring 2020, citing the COVID-19 pandemic, with plans to re-open within weeks. However, it was announced in 2021 that the theatre would be razed, and in October 2021 a "pre-demolition auction" of theatre items and personal memorabilia was held and it was expected then that the demolition would take place within 60 days. The famous "guitar neck" in front of the theater, regarded as a beloved Branson landmark, was saved in an effort by preservationists and fans.

== Personal life ==
From 1978 to 1980, Stafford was married to singer-songwriter Bobbie Gentry and they have a son. Stafford was later married to Ann Britt Stafford for 24 years; she was a co-owner of the Jim Stafford Theatre in Branson until December 2013.

== Filmography ==
- Gemini Man/Riding with Death (1976) – Buffalo Bill
- Any Which Way You Can (1980) – Long John
- E.S.P. (1983)
- Kid Colter (1984) – Bill Colter
- Bloodsuckers from Outer Space (1984) – Buford
- Gordy (1995) – Branson performer

== Discography ==
=== Albums ===
Year	Album	Peak chart positions				Label
Year	Album	US	US Country	AUS	CAN	Label
1970	Welcome to Maddox Country	—	—	—	—	Southern Mother
1971	Jim Stafford	—	—	—	—	Sharyn-Shag
1974	Jim Stafford	55	6	27	48	MGM
1975	Not Just Another Pretty Foot	—	—	—	—	MGM
1993	New Deal	—	—	—	—	Strats Publishing
1995	Greatest Hits	—	—	—	—	Curb
1995	Live in Branson	—	—	—	—	Jim Stafford Theatre
1996	Guitar Gold	—	—	—	—	Jim Stafford Theatre
1996	Guitar Gospel	—	—	—	—	Jim Stafford Theatre
1997	Plays Harmonica	—	—	—	—	Strats Publishing
2002	Don't Tell Mama I'm a Guitar Picker	—	—	—	—	Strats Publishing
2002	Somewhere in Time	—	—	—	—	Jim Stafford Theatre
2006	Best of Jim Stafford	—	—	—	—	UMVD Special Markets

=== Singles ===
Year	Single	Peak chart positions							R.I.A.A.	Album
Year	Single	US	US Country	CAN	AUS	CAN Country	CAN AC	UK	R.I.A.A.	Album
1973	"Swamp Witch"	39	—	46	21	—	—	—	—	Jim Stafford
1974	"Spiders & Snakes"	3	66	1	19	—	9	14	Gold	Jim Stafford
1974	"My Girl Bill"	12	64	7	12	16	18	20	—	Jim Stafford
1974	"Wildwood Weed"	7	57	3	—	—	2	—	—	Jim Stafford
1974	"Your Bulldog Drinks Champagne"	24	—	46	—	—	—	—	—	Not Just Another Pretty Foot
1975	"I Got Stoned and I Missed It"	37	—	78	—	—	—	—	—	Not Just Another Pretty Foot
1976	"Jasper"	69	—	—	—	—	—	—	—	Non-album release
1977	"Turn Loose of My Leg"	98	—	—	—	—	—	—	—	Non-album release
1978	"You Can Call Me Clyde"	—	—	—	—	—	—	—	—	Non-album release
1980	"Don't Fool Around"	—	—	—	—	—	—	—	—	Non-album release
1981	"Cow Patti"	102	65	—	—	31	—	—	—	Any Which Way You Can Soundtrack
1981	"Isabel and Samantha"	—	—	—	—	—	—	—	—	Non-album release
1982	"What Mama Don't Know"	—	61	—	—	—	—	—	—	Non-album release
1984	"Little Bits and Pieces"	—	67	—	—	—	—	—	—	Non-album release

== Bibliography ==
- Roland, Tom (November 5, 1998). "Jim Stafford". In Kingsbury, Paul (ed.). The Encyclopedia of Country Music. New York: Oxford University Press. p. 500. ISBN 978-0-1951-7608-7.
