= Lobo (musician) =

American singer-songwriter (born 1943)

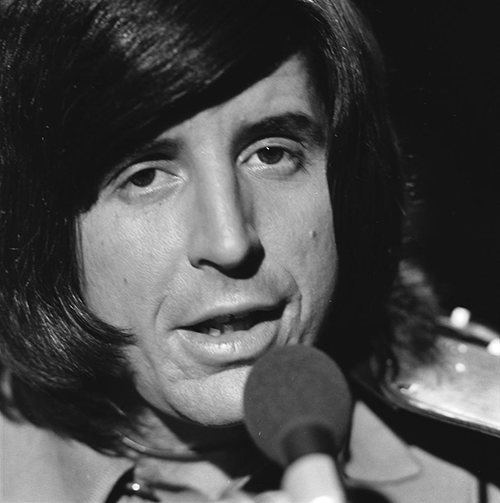
- Lobo in 1973

Background information
- Born: Roland Kent LaVoie; July 31, 1943 (age 83); Tallahassee, Florida, U.S.
- Genres: Pop, soft rock, country
- Occupation: Singer-songwriter
- Instruments: Vocals, guitar
- Years active: 1961–present
- Labels: Laurie, Big Tree, MCA, Lobo, Curb, Pony Canyon
- Website: fansoflobo.com

Roland Kent LaVoie (born July 31, 1943), better known by his stage name Lobo (which is Spanish for wolf), is an American singer-songwriter who was successful in the 1970s, scoring several U.S. Top 10 hits including "Me and You and a Dog Named Boo", "I'd Love You to Want Me", and "Don't Expect Me to Be Your Friend". These three songs, along with "Where Were You When I Was Falling in Love", gave Lobo four chart toppers on the Easy Listening/Hot Adult Contemporary chart.

== Career ==
=== 1961–1970: Early years ===
Born in Tallahassee, Florida, LaVoie was raised by his mother in Winter Haven, Florida, with his six siblings. He began his musical career in 1961 as a member of a local band, The Rumours. The band included Gram Parsons and Jim Stafford, as well as drummer Jon Corneal, who later joined Parsons' International Submarine Band.

In 1964, while attending the University of South Florida, LaVoie joined a band called the Sugar Beats and met producer Phil Gernhard. He recorded a regional hit for the band, a cover of Johnny Rivers' song "What Am I Doing Here?"

During the 1960s, LaVoie performed with many other bands, including US Male, The Uglies, and Me and the Other Guys. It was in the latter band that he met musician Billy Aerts, who became a member of Lobo's touring band in the early 1970s and produced Lobo's comeback album in 1989.

Again working with Gernhard, his first solo record was released in 1969 on Laurie Records. It included the original tracks "Happy Days in New York City" backed with "My Friend Is Here".

=== 1971–1975: Success with Big Tree ===
By 1971, LaVoie had started calling himself Lobo (Spanish for wolf). Gernhard was an executive for Big Tree Records, and the company released his first single, "Me and You and a Dog Named Boo", in March 1971. The first major hit for the label, it reached No. 5 in the US and No. 4 in the UK by May, launching a successful series of singles. It sold over one million copies and was awarded a gold disc in September 1971.

His debut album, Introducing Lobo, came in May 1971. In June his second single, "She Didn't Do Magic", was released. In September, "California Kid and Reemo" was released, followed by The Albatross. When Big Tree Records merged with Bell Records, Lobo's second project album Close Up was never released.

Under the Lobo alias, he then released Of a Simple Man in 1972, which included back-to-back U.S. Top 10 hits, including "I'd Love You to Want Me" (No. 2, November 18–25, 1972) and "Don't Expect Me to Be Your Friend" (No. 8, February 17–24, 1973). The former became Lobo's biggest hit, a million-seller gaining gold disc status in November 1972 and internationally reaching No. 1 in Germany in December 1973 and No. 5 in the United Kingdom in July 1974.

With the release of Calumet in 1973, Lobo had three more Top 40 hits: "It Sure Took a Long, Long Time", "How Can I Tell Her", and "Standing at the End of the Line". He made an appearance on American Bandstand that year. There were two further minor hit singles from the album: "There Ain't No Way" and "Love Me for What I Am".

In June 1974 Lobo's fourth album, Just a Singer, was released. It was the first album by Lobo to contain tracks not written by him. The only single from the album was "Rings". "Don't Tell Me Goodnight" in 1975 became his last Top 30 single for Big Tree. Lobo also released the album, A Cowboy Afraid of Horses, with "Would I Still Have You" released as a single. The label followed it up with a compilation album that year entitled The Best of Lobo.

=== 1976–1985: Curb Records, and move to Nashville ===
In 1976 Lobo broke away from Big Tree, releasing the album Come with Me in Europe on the Philips label. "At First Sight" and "It's Everywhere" were the singles. Neither was released in the US.

Lobo signed with Curb Records in 1977, releasing the single "Afterglow", co-produced by Lobo and Gernhard, and in 1978 "You Are All I'll Ever Need". No full-length album materialized from these sessions.

In 1979 Lobo was signed to Curb/MCA Records, where he worked with producer Bob Montgomery, releasing the single "Where Were You When I Was Falling in Love", which reached No. 23. The song also reached No. 1 on the Adult Contemporary chart. He also released his first US album in four years, Lobo. Other singles for Curb were "Holding On for Dear Love", "With a Love Like Ours", and "Fight Fire with Fire".

Reportedly dissatisfied with the production of his records, Lobo sought a release from his Curb contract. He moved to Nashville and, in 1981, started his own label, Lobo Records, releasing several singles including "I Don't Want to Want You" (written by his brother, Roger LaVoie), "Come Looking for Me", and "Living My Life Without You", all of which charted in the country charts. He also released "Bull Smith Can't Dance the Cotton Eye Joe" with the group Wolfpack, which included Narvel Felts and Kenny Earl.

Lobo Records was renamed Evergreen Records in 1985. The label released two of his singles: "Am I Going Crazy" and "Paint the Town Blue", the latter a duet with Robin Lee.

=== 1987–present: Asian popularity and recent years ===
Although he is far less followed now in the United States, Lobo's popularity grew in Asia, fanned by the release of his greatest hits compilations in 1987 and 1988. This encouraged him to release in 1989 his first new album in 10 years, entitled Am I Going Crazy. It was recorded in Taiwan on UFO/WEA Records and was produced by Billy Aerts. He signed a multi-album deal with PonyCanyon Records in Singapore, and in 1994 released Asian Moon, repackaging some of the tracks from Am I Going Crazy along with newly recorded material. His follow-up album Classic Hits in 1995 were re-recordings of Lobo hits and some cover versions. In 1996 he released the album Sometimes, containing all new original songs.

On another Asian label, Springroll Entertainment, he released You Must Remember This in 1997, an album of pop standards that was released in two formats, one with vocals and the other with instrumental tracks.

In 2000, Lobo signed with a German record company, Gmbh Entertainment, and recorded a few tracks for various hits CDs. He also co-wrote two Christmas songs with Billy Aerts, "A Big Kid's Christmas" and "Late Christmas Eve", which have been released on various Christmas compilations from 2000 to present. Singles recorded during this period include "Let It Be Me", "Who'll Stop the Rain", and "Different Drum".

In 2006, based on his Asian popularity, he toured in Southeast Asia. In 2008, Lobo released Out of Time with old favorites and some new songs. A tribute album to the original era of the early Lobo recordings was made available from the website.

== Discography ==
=== Albums ===
| Year | Album | Chart positions | | | |
| Year | Album | US | CAN | AUS | UK |
|---|---|---|---|---|---|
| 1971 | Introducing Lobo | 178 | 92 | — | — |
| 1972 | Of a Simple Man | 37 | 19 | 18 | — |
| 1973 | Introducing Lobo [rerelease] | 163 | — | — | — |
| 1973 | Calumet | 128 | — | — | — |
| 1974 | Just a Singer | 183 | — | — | — |
| 1975 | A Cowboy Afraid of Horses | 151 | — | — | — |
| 1976 | Come with Me | — | — | — | — |
| 1979 | Lobo | 207 | — | — | — |
| 1989 | Am I Going Crazy | — | — | — | — |
| 1994 | Asian Moon | — | — | — | — |
| 1995 | Classic Hits | — | — | — | — |
| 1996 | Sometimes | — | — | — | — |
| 1997 | You Must Remember This | — | — | — | — |
| 1997 | You Must Remember This – The Instrumental Album | — | — | — | — |
| 2008 | Out of Time | — | — | — | — |
| 2010 | Propinquity | — | — | — | — |
| 2022 | That Shows You What I Know | — | — | — | — |

=== Compilations ===
- 1975 The Best of Lobo (Big Tree)
- 1990 Greatest Hits (Curb)
- 1993 The Best of Lobo (Rhino)
- 1996 The Best of Lobo (Curb)
- 1996 I'd Love You to Want Me (Rhino)
- 1997 Me & You & a Dog Named Boo & Other Hits (Rhino)
- 2004 The Very Best of Lobo (WEA International)
- 2005 Introducing Lobo/Of a Simple Man (Wounded Bird)
- 2005 Platinum Collection
- 2006 Ultimate Collection (EMI) Malaysia
- 2006 Me & You & a Dog Named Boo & Other Hits (Collectables)
- 2007 Greatest Hits (Lobo Records)

=== Singles ===
| Year | Single | Chart positions | | | | | | |
| Year | Single | US | US AC | US Country | CAN | AUS | NZ | UK |
|---|---|---|---|---|---|---|---|---|
| 1964 | "What Am I Doing Here with You?" [as the Sugar Beats] | — | — | — | — | — | — | — |
| 1966 | "It's Gonna Be So Hard" [as the Uglies] | — | — | — | — | — | — | — |
| 1969 | "Happy Days in New York City" [as Kent LaVoie] | — | — | — | — | — | — | — |
| 1971 | "Me and You and a Dog Named Boo" | 5 | 1 | — | 6 | 8 | 1 | 4 |
| 1971 | "She Didn't Do Magic" | 46 | — | — | — | — | — | — |
| 1971 | b/w "I'm the Only One" | 76* | 14 | — | 30 | — | — | |
| 1971 | "California Kid and Reemo" | 72 | 19 | — | 41 | — | — | — |
| 1972 | "We'll Make It – I know We Will" | 108* | — | — | — | — | — | — |
| 1972 | b/w "The Albatross" | 128* | — | — | — | — | — | — |
| 1972 | "A Simple Man" | 56 | 17 | — | 43 | — | — | |
| 1972 | "I'd Love You to Want Me" | 2 | 1 | — | 1 | 1 | 1 | 5 |
| 1972 | "Don't Expect Me to Be Your Friend" | 8 | 1 | — | 4 | 4 | 4 | — |
| 1973 | "It Sure Took a Long, Long Time" | 27 | 3 | — | 41 | 49 | 14 | — |
| 1973 | "How Can I Tell Her" | 22 | 4 | — | 27 | 49 | — | — |
| 1973 | "There Ain't No Way" | 68 | 29 | — | — | 94 | — | — |
| 1973 | b/w "Love Me for What I Am" | 86 | — | — | — | — | — | — |
| 1974 | "Standing at the End of the Line" | 37 | 25 | — | 26 | — | — | — |
| 1974 | "Rings" | 43 | 8 | — | 30 | — | — | — |
| 1975 | "Don't Tell Me Goodnight" | 27 | 2 | — | 50 | — | — | — |
| 1975 | "Would I Still Have You" | — | 44 | — | — | — | — | — |
| 1976 | "At First Sight" | — | — | — | — | — | — | — |
| 1976 | "It's Everywhere" | — | — | — | — | — | — | — |
| 1977 | "Afterglow" | — | — | — | — | — | — | — |
| 1978 | "You Are All I Ever Need" | — | — | — | — | — | — | — |
| 1979 | "Where Were You When I Was Falling in Love" | 23 | 1 | — | 67 | 94 | — | — |
| 1979 | "Holdin' On for Dear Love" | 75 | 13 | — | — | — | — | — |
| 1980 | "With a Love Like Ours" | — | — | — | — | — | — | — |
| 1980 | "Fight Fire with Fire" | — | — | — | — | — | — | — |
| 1981 | "I Don't Want to Want You" | — | — | 40 | — | — | — | — |
| 1982 | "Come Looking for Me" | — | — | 63 | — | — | — | — |
| 1982 | "Bull Smith Can't Dance the Cotton-Eyed Joe" (with Wolfpack) | — | — | 88 | — | — | — | — |
| 1982 | "Living My Life Without You" | — | — | 88 | — | — | — | — |
| 1985 | "Am I Going Crazy" | — | — | 57 | — | — | — | — |
| 1985 | "Paint the Town Blue" (with Robin Lee) | — | — | 49 | — | — | — | — |

US chart is Billboard unless otherwise noted. * Cash Box singles chart.
