= List of songs recorded by Alabama =

List of songs by the American country band, Alabama

Alabama is an American country, and bluegrass band that has recorded nineteen studio albums, including sixteen for RCA Nashville, as well as two Christmas albums and two Christian music albums. Formed in Fort Payne, Alabama in 1969, the band was founded by Randy Owen (lead vocals, rhythm guitar) and his cousin Teddy Gentry (bass guitar, background vocals), soon joined by their other cousin, Jeff Cook (lead guitar, fiddle, keyboards). Alabama's biggest success came in the 1980s, where the band had over 27 number one hits, seven multi-platinum albums and received numerous awards. Alabama's first single on RCA Nashville, "Tennessee River", began a streak of number one singles, including "Love in the First Degree" (1981), "Mountain Music" (1982), "Dixieland Delight" (1983), "If You're Gonna Play in Texas (You Gotta Have a Fiddle in the Band)" (1984) and "Song of the South" (1988).

Alabama's main members — Randy Owen, Teddy Gentry, and Jeff Cook — wrote or co-wrote a significant amount of material in their catalogue, which was considered unusual for country musicians at that time. Contributing songwriter Greg Fowler is credited on 72 Alabama songs, followed by Ronnie Rogers at 68. The group has recorded 260 songs (65 of which are singles), which include original compositions, cover songs, collaborations with artists such as Lionel Richie and Brad Paisley.

== Songs ==
Key
†	Indicates single release

Song	Writer(s)	Album	Year	Ref.
"Alabama Sky"	Larry Shell	The Closer You Get...	1983	
"All American"	Trey Bruce	Alabama & Friends	2013	
"All American Woman"		Wild Country	1976	
"Amazing Grace"	John Newton	Songs of Inspiration	2006	
"American Pride"	Randy Owen	American Pride	1992	
"Angels Among Us" †	Don Goodman; Becky Hobbs	Cheap Seats	1993	
"Anytime (I'm Your Man)"	Randy Owen; Teddy Gentry; Greg Fowler; Ronnie Rogers	Dancin' on the Boulevard	1997	
"Are You Sure Hank Done It This Way"	Waylon Jennings	The Music Inside: A Collaboration Dedicated to Waylon Jennings	2010	
"As Right Now"	Teddy Gentry; Greg Fowler	40-Hour Week	1985	
"Back to Alabam'"		Deuces Wild	1977	
"Barefootin'"	Robert Parker	Southern Star	1989	
"A Better Word for Love"	Al Anderson; Gary Nicholson	Cheap Seats	1993	
"Between the Two of Them"	Mickey Cates	American Pride	1992	
"The Blessings"	Randy Owen; Teddy Gentry; Greg Fowler; Ronnie Rogers	Christmas Vol. II	1996	
"The Borderline"	Teddy Gentry; Greg Fowler; Larry Hanson; Virgil Beckham	Southern Star	1989	
"Born Country" †	Byron Hill; John Schweers	Greatest Hits Vol. II	1991	
"The Boy"	Randy Owen; Teddy Gentry; Greg Fowler	Roll On	1984	
"Burn Georgia Burn"	Tim Lewis; Roger Murrah	Feels So Right	1981	
"Calling All Angels"	Jeff Jones	Dancin' on the Boulevard	1997	
"Can't Forget About You"	Teddy Gentry	The Alabama Band #3; My Home's in Alabama	1979; 1980	
"Can't Keep a Good Man Down" †	Bob Corbin	40-Hour Week	1985	
"Can't You See"	Toy Caldwell	Alabama Live	1988	
"A Candle in the Window"	Susan Longacre; Walt Aldridge; Gary Baker	Alabama Christmas	1985	
"Carolina Mountain Dewe"	Randy Owen	Roll On	1984	
"Changes Comin' On"	Buddy Cannon; Jimmy Darrell; Dean Dillon	Mountain Music	1982	
"The Cheap Seats" †	Marcus Hummon; Randy Sharp	Cheap Seats	1993	
"Christmas in Dixie" †	Randy Owen; Teddy Gentry; Jeff Cook; Mark Herndon	Non-album single Alabama Christmas	1982; 1985	
"Christmas in Your Arms"	Bill Anderson; Steve Wariner	Christmas Vol. II	1996	
"Christmas Is Love"	Rich Alves; T. J. Knight; Jerry Taylor	Christmas Vol. II	1996	
"Christmas Memories"	Becky Hobbs; John Greenebaum; Randy Albright	Alabama Christmas	1985	
"The Christmas Spirit"	Randy Owen; Teddy Gentry; Ronnie Rogers	Christmas Vol. II	1996	
"Church in the Wildwood"	Randy Owen, traditional	Songs of Inspiration II	2007	
"Clear Across America Tonight"	Randy Owen; Teddy Gentry; Greg Fowler; Ronnie Rogers	When It All Goes South	2001	
"Clear Water Blues"	Teddy Gentry; Greg Fowler; Ronnie Rogers	Cheap Seats	1993	
"Close Enough to Perfect" †	Carl Chambers	Mountain Music	1982	
"The Closer You Get" †	Mark Gray; J.P. Pennington	The Closer You Get...	1983	
"Country Side of Life"	Maurice R. Hirsch	Roll On	1984	
"Cruisin'"	Jeff Cook; Vern Dant; Ted Hewitt	The Touch	1986	
"Dancin', Shaggin' on the Boulevard" †	Randy Owen; Teddy Gentry; Greg Fowler	Dancin' on the Boulevard	1997	
"Deep River Woman" † (Lionel Richie featuring Alabama)	Lionel Richie	Dancing on the Ceiling	1987	
"Dixie Boy"	Jim McBride	The Closer You Get...	1983	
"Dixie Fire"	Jeff Cook; Vern Dant; Hunter Moore	Southern Star	1989	
"Dixieland Delight" †	Ronnie Rogers	The Closer You Get...	1983	
"Down by the Riverside"	Randy Owen, traditional	Songs of Inspiration II	2007	
"Down Home" †	Rick Bowles; Josh Leo	Pass It on Down	1990	
"Down on Longboat Key"	Dennis Morgan; Steve Davis	40-Hour Week	1985	
"Down on the River"	Teddy Gentry; Greg Fowler; Robert Byrne	Southern Star	1989	
"Down This Road"	Michael Dulaney; Michael Lunn	When It All Goes South	2001	
"The End of the Lyin'"	Robert Byrne; Alan Schulman	Roll On	1984	
"Face to Face" (with K.T. Oslin) †	Randy Owen	Just Us	1987	
"Fallin' Again" †	Randy Owen; Teddy Gentry; Greg Fowler	Just Us	1987	
"The Fans"	Randy Owen; Teddy Gentry; Greg Fowler	Greatest Hits	1986	
"Fantasy"	Randy Owen; Teddy Gentry; Jeff Cook; Rick Scott	The Alabama Band #3; Feels So Right	1979; 1981	
"Feels So Right" †	Randy Owen	Feels So Right	1981	
"Fire on Fire"	Teddy Gentry; Greg Fowler; Ronnie Rogers	Pass It on Down	1990	
"Fireworks"	Ronny Scaife; Phil Thomas; Kenny Durham	40-Hour Week	1985	
"Five O'Clock 500"	Randy Owen; Teddy Gentry; Ronnie Rogers	For the Record	1998	
"Flying United"		Wild Country	1976	
"Food on the Table"	Randy Owen	Roll On	1984	
"Forever's as Far as I'll Go" †	Mike Reid	Pass It on Down	1990	
"Forty Hour Week (For A Livin')" †	Dave Loggins; Lisa Silver; Don Schlitz	40-Hour Week	1985	
"Get It While It's Hot"	Radny Owen; Teddy Gentry; Jeff Cook; Rick Scott	Deuces Wild; My Home's in Alabama	1977; 1980	
"Getting Over You"	Cary Rutledge	My Home's in Alabama	1980	
"Give Me One More Shot" †	Randy Owen; Teddy Gentry; Ronnie Rogers	Greatest Hits Vol. III	1994	
"(God Must Have Spent) A Little More Time on You" (with 'N Sync) †	Evan Rogers; Carl Sturken	Twentieth Century	1999	
"Gonna Have a Party"	Bruce Channel; Cliff Cochran; Kieran Kane	Mountain Music	1982	
"Goodbye (Kelly's Song)"	Randy Owen	Pass It on Down	1990	
"Green River"	John Fogerty	Mountain Music	1982	
"Gulf of Mexico"	Teddy Gentry; Robert Byrne	Pass It on Down	1990	
"Hangin' 'Round the Mistletoe"	Kostas Lazarides	Christmas Vol. II	1996	
"Hanging Up My Travelin' Shoes"	Randy Owen; Teddy Gentry	Wild Country; My Home's in Alabama	1976; 1980	
"Happy Birthday Jesus"	Teddy Gentry; J. P. Pennington	Christmas Vol. II	1996	
"Happy Holidays"	Ronnie Rogers; Swain Schaefer	Alabama Christmas	1985	
"Hats Off"	Randy Owen; Teddy Gentry; Greg Fowler; Ronnie Rogers	Greatest Hits Vol. II	1991	
"Heartbreak Express"	Jeff Cook; Phillip Wolfe	In Pictures	1995	
"Here We Are" †	Beth Nielsen Chapman; Vince Gill	Pass It on Down	1990	
"Hey! Baby"	Bruce Channel; Margaret Cobb	Dancin' on the Boulevard	1997	
"High Cotton" †	Roger Murrah; Scott Anders	Southern Star	1989	
"His Eye Is on the Sparrow"	Civilla D. Martin; Charles H. Gabriel	Songs of Inspiration	2006	
"Hollywood"	Gary Stewart; Wayne Carson	Feels So Right	1981	
"Homecoming Christmas"	Ronnie Rogers	Alabama Christmas	1985	
"Homesick Fever"	Randy Owen; Ronnie Rogers	American Pride	1992	
"Hometown Honeymoon" †	Josh Leo; Jim Photoglo	American Pride	1992	
"How Do You Fall in Love" †	Randy Owen; Teddy Gentry; Greg Fowler	For the Record	1998	
"How Great Thou Art"	Stuart K. Hine	Songs of Inspiration	2006	
"I Ain't Got No Business Doin' Business Today"	Danny Morrison; Johnny Slate	Pass It on Down	1990	
"I Am a Pilgrim"	Randy Owen, traditional	Songs of Inspiration II	2007	
"I Am the Man Thomas"	Larry Sparks; Ralph Stanley	Songs of Inspiration	2006	
"I Can't Hide My Heart"	Randy Owen; Teddy Gentry; Greg Fowler; Ronnie Rogers	When It All Goes South	2001	
"I Can't Love You Any Less"	Randy Owen; Teddy Gentry; Greg Fowler; Ronnie Rogers	When It All Goes South	2001	
"I Can't Stop"	Teddy Gentry; Robert Byrne	Just Us	1987	
"I Go on Lovin' You"		Wild Country	1976	
"I Just Couldn't Say No"	Randy Owen; Teddy Gentry; Greg Fowler	Dancin' on the Boulevard	1997	
"I Love You Enough to Let You Go"	Randy Owen; Gary Baker; Frank J. Myers	Twentieth Century	1999	
"I Need Thee"	Annie S. Hawks; Robert Lowry	Songs of Inspiration	2006	
"I Saw the Time"	Randy Owen	Just Us	1987	
"I Showed Her"	Teddy Gentry; Greg Fowler; Walt Aldridge	Southern Star	1989	
"I Taught Her Everything She Knows"	Teddy Gentry; Greg Fowler; John Jarrard; Walt Aldridge	The Touch	1986	
"I Wanna Come Over" †	Richard Berardi; Michael Berardi	My Home's in Alabama †	1980	
"I Want Be With You Tonight" †		Deuces Wild	1977	
"I Want to Know You Before We Make Love"	Becky Hobbs; Candy Parton	40-Hour Week	1985	
"I Was Young Once Too"	Richard Leigh; Robet Byrne	Christmas Vol. II	1996	
"(I Wish It Could Always Be) '55"	Randy Owen	Just Us	1987	
"I Write a Little"	Randy Owen; Jeff Cook; Ronnie Rogers	When It All Goes South	2001	
"I'll Be There Call on Me"		Wild Country	1976	
"I'm in a Hurry (And Don't Know Why)" †	Roger Murrah; Randy VanWarmer	American Pride	1992	
"I'm in That Kind of Mood"	Randy Owen; Teddy Gentry; Greg Fowler; Ronnie Rogers	Twentieth Century	1999	
"I'm in the Mood" †	Lewis Anderson; Ronnie Rogers	In the Mood: The Love Songs	2003	
"I'm Not That Way Anymore"	Randy Owen; Teddy Gentry; Mark Herndon; Greg Fowler	Roll On	1984	
"I'm Still Dreamin'"	John Dillon; Steve Cash	Southern Star	1989	
"I'm Stoned"	Randy Owen; Teddy Gentry	Feels So Right	1981	
"I've Loved a Lot More Than I've Hurt"	Max T. Barnes; Max D. Barnes	In Pictures	1995	
"If I Could Just See You Now"	Jeff Cook; Lynde Darrell-Boles	Just Us	1987	
"If I Had You" †	Danny Mayo; Kerry Chater	Southern Star	1989	
"If It Ain't Dixie (It Won't Do)"	John Jarrard; Kent Robbins	40-Hour Week	1985	
"If You're Gonna Play in Texas (You Gotta Have a Fiddle in the Band)" †	Dan Mitchell; Murry Kellum	Roll On	1984	
"In Pictures" †	Bobby Boyd; Joe Doyle	In Pictures	1995	
"In the Garden"	C. Austin Miles	Songs of Inspiration	2006	
"In the Sweet By and By"	Sanford F. Bennett; Joseph Philbrick Webster	Songs of Inspiration	2006	
"Is the Magic Still There"	Randy Owen; Teddy Gentry; Greg Fowler	Dancin' on the Boulevard	1997	
"Is This How Love Begins"	Bob Corbin	The Touch	1986	
"It Works" †	Mickey Cates; Mark Alan Springer	In Pictures	1995	
"It's All Comin' Back to Me Now"	Dave Loggins	The Touch	1986	
"Jesus Loves Me"	William Batchelder Bradbury; David Rutherford McGuire; Anna Bartlett Warner	Songs of Inspiration	2006	
"Joseph and Mary's Boy"	Don Cook; Keith Whitley	Alabama Christmas	1985	
"Jukebox in My Mind" †	Dave Gibson; Ronnie Rogers	Pass It on Down	1990	
"Just Along for the Ride"		The Alabama Band #3	1979	
"Katy Brought My Guitar Back Today"	Mickey Cates; John Jarrard	Cheap Seats	1993	
"Keep on Dreamin'"	Jeff Cook; Rick Scott	The Alabama Band #3; My Home's in Alabama	1979; 1980	
"Keepin' Up" †	Randy Owen; Teddy Gentry; Greg Fowler; Ronnie Rogers	For the Record	1998	
"Lady Down on Love" †	Randy Owen	Deuces Wild; The Closer You Get...	1977; 1983	
"Let's Hear It for the Girl"	S. Alan Taylor	The Touch	1986	
"Life's Too Short to Love This Fast"	Randy Owen; Gary Baker; Frank J. Myers	Twentieth Century	1999	
"Lifetime Memories"		Deuces Wild	1977	
"The Little Drummer Boy"	Katherine Kennicott Davis; Henry Onorati; Harry Simeone	Christmas Vol. II	1996	
"Little Things"	Randy Owen; Teddy Gentry; Greg Fowler; Buddy Cannon; John Jarrard	Twentieth Century	1999	
"The Living Years"	Mike Rutherford; B. A. Robertson	In the Mood: The Love Songs	2003	
"Lonesome Valley"	Randy Owen, traditional	Songs of Inspiration II	2007	
"Louisiana Moon"	Larry Shell; Dan Mitchell	40-Hour Week	1985	
"Love in the First Degree" †	Tim DuBois; Jim Hurt	Feels So Right	1981	
"Love Lifted Me"	Randy Owen; James Rowe; Howard E. Smith	Songs of Inspiration II	2007	
"Love Remains" (featuring Christopher Cross)	Randy Goodrum; Rob Mathes	When It All Goes South	2001	
"Lovin' Man"	Jeff CookLovin' Man	The Closer You Get...	1983	
"Loving You Is Killing Me" "Lovin' You Is Killin' Me"	Jeff Cook	Deuces Wild; Mountain Music	1977; 1982	
"Make It with You"		Wild Country	1976	
"The Maker Said Take Her" †	Ronnie Rogers; Mark Wright	In Pictures	1995	
"Mist of Desire"	Jeff Cook	Twentieth Century	1999	
"Moonlight Lounge"	Ronnie Rogers	Pass It on Down	1990	
"Mountain Music" †	Randy Owen	Mountain Music	1982	
"Music Moves Me"		Wild Country	1976	
"My Girl"	Ronald White; Smokey Robinson	Dancin' on the Boulevard	1997	
"My Home's in Alabama" †	Randy Owen; Teddy Gentry	The Alabama Band #3; My Home's in Alabama	1979; 1980	
"My Love Belongs to You"	Ronnie Rogers	In Pictures	1995	
"My Sweet Country Woman"		Wild Country	1976	
"Never Be One"	Teddy Gentry	Mountain Music	1982	
"New Year's Eve 1999"	Gretchen Peters	Christmas Vol. II	1996	
"The Night Before Christmas"	Jim McBride; Sam Hogin; Nelson Larkin	Christmas Vol. II	1996	
"Nothing Comes Close"	Ronnie Rogers	In the Mood: The Love Songs	2003	
"Nothing Comes Closer"	Ronnie Rogers	In Pictures	1995	
"O Little Town of Bethlehem"	Lewis Redner	Christmas Vol. II	1996	
"Of Course I'm Alright" †	Billy Kirsch	Dancin' on the Boulevard	1997	
"Old Alabama" † (Brad Paisley featuring Alabama)	Randy Owen; Brad Paisley; Chris DuBois; Dave Turnbull	This Is Country Music	2011	
"Old Flame" †	Donny Lowery; Mac McAnally	Feels So Right	1981	
"Old Man"	Teddy Gentry; John Jarrard; Lisa Palas	Just Us	1987	
"The Old Rugged Cross"	George Bennard	Songs of Inspiration	2006	
"Old Shep"	Red Foley	Songs of Inspiration	2006	
"'Ole' Baugh Road"	Randy Owen	Southern Star	1989	
"On This Side of the Moon"	Mark Alan Springer	Cheap Seats	1993	
"Once Upon a Lifetime" †	Gary Baker; Frank J. Myers	American Pride	1992	
"One Big Heaven"	Randy Owen	Songs of Inspiration	2006	
"One Life"	Buck Moore; Eric Todd	Songs of Inspiration II	2007	
"One More Time Around"	Randy Owen; Teddy Gentry; Greg Fowler; Tim Briggs; Larry Hanson	Dancin' on the Boulevard	1997	
"Pass It on Down" †	Randy Owen; Teddy Gentry; Will Robinson; Ronnie Rogers	Pass It on Down	1990	
"Pete's Music City"	Monty Powell	Southern Star	1989	
"Pictures and Memories"	Jeff Cook; Monty Wilson	American Pride	1992	
"Pony Express"	Teddy Gentry; Ken Lambert; Buddy Cannon; Dean Dillon	The Touch	1986	
"Precious Memories"	Randy Owen; Lonnie B. Combs; J.B.F. Wright	Songs of Inspiration II	2007	
"Rain"	Randy Owen	Songs of Inspiration	2006	
"Reckless" †	Michael Clark; Jeff Stevens	Cheap Seats	1993	
"Red River"	Bud McGuire; George Pearce	The Closer You Get...	1983	
"The Refrain of John Dillon James"	Kenny Rogers	Songs of Inspiration II	2007	
"Reinvent the Wheel"	Walt Aldridge; Brad Crisler	When It All Goes South	2001	
"Richard Petty Fans"	Randy Owen; Teddy Gentry; Greg Fowler; John Jarrard	American Pride	1992	
"Ride the Train"	Teddy Gentry	Feels So Right	1981	
"Right Where I Am"	Randy Owen; Teddy Gentry; Greg Fowler; Ronnie Rogers	When It All Goes South	2001	
"Rock of Ages"	Augustus Montague Toplady; Thomas Hastings	Songs of Inspiration	2006	
"Rockin' Around the Christmas Tree"	Johnny Marks	Christmas Vol. II	1996	
"Roll On (Eighteen Wheeler)" †	Dave Loggins	Roll On	1984	
"Sad Lookin' Moon" †	Randy Owen; Teddy Gentry; Greg Fowler	Dancin' on the Boulevard	1997	
"Santa Claus (I Still Believe In You)"	Randy Owen; Teddy Gentry; Greg Fowler; Linda Gentry; John Jarrard	Alabama Christmas	1985	
"Say I" †	Steve Bogard; Jeff Stevens	In Pictures	1995	
"See the Embers, Feel the Flame"	Don Cook	Feels So Right	1981	
"She Ain't Your Ordinary Girl" †	Robert Jason	In Pictures	1995	
"She and I" †	Dave Loggins	Greatest Hits	1986	
"She Can"	Steve Seskin; Austin Gardner	Southern Star	1989	
"She Put the Sad in All His Songs"	Robert Byrne; Mac McAnally	The Closer You Get...	1983	
"(She Won't Have a Thing to Do With) Nobody But Me"	Dean Dillon; Buzz Rabin "Flash Gordon"	40-Hour Week	1985	
"She's Got That Look in Her Eyes" †	Randy Owen; Teddy Gentry	Dancin' on the Boulevard	1997	
"Silent Night"	Franz Gruber; Josef Mohr	Songs of Inspiration	2006	
"Simple as That"	Chapin Hartford	When It All Goes South	2001	
"Small Stuff" †	Mark Collie; Hillary Kanter; Even Stevens	Twentieth Century	1999	
"Some Other Place, Some Other Time, Some Other Love" "Some Other Place, Some Other Time"	Jeff Cook	Deuces Wild; My Home's in Alabama	1977; 1980	
"Sometimes Out of Touch"	Teddy Gentry; Greg Fowler; Ronnie Rogers	American Pride	1992	
"Song of the South" †	Bob McDill	Southern Star	1989	
"Southern Star" †	Roger Murrah; Steve Dean; Rich Alves	Southern Star	1989	
"Spin the Wheel"	Michael Clark; Jeff Stevens	In Pictures	1995	
"The Star-Spangled Banner"	Francis Scott Key	Songs of Inspiration II	2007	
"Start Living"	Steven Dale Jones	When It All Goes South	2001	
"Starting Tonight"	Teddy Gentry; Greg Fowler; John Jarrard; S. Alan Taylor	Pass It on Down	1990	
"Still Goin' Strong"	Rick Bowles; Josh Leo	Cheap Seats	1993	
"Sunday Drive"	Ray Kennedy; Dak Alley	In Pictures	1995	
"Suppertime"	Jimmie Davis	Songs of Inspiration II	2007	
"Take a Little Trip" †	Ronnie Rogers; Mark Wright	American Pride	1992	
"Take Me Down" †	Mark Gray; J.P. Pennington	Mountain Music	1982	
"Takin' Care of Business"	Randy Bachman	Gonna Have a Party... Live	1993	
"Tar Top" †	Randy Owen	Just Us	1987	
"Tennessee Christmas"	Gary Chapman; Amy Grant	Alabama Christmas	1985	
"Tennessee River and a Mountain, Man" "Tennessee River" †		Deuces Wild; The Alabama Band #3; My Home's in Alabama	1977; 1979; 1980	
"That Feeling"	Teddy Gentry; Greg Fowler; Ronnie Rogers	Cheap Seats	1993	
"That's How I Was Raised"	Charley Stefl; Tony Ramey; Skip Sasser; Trent Tomlinson	Alabama & Friends	2013	
"Then Again" †	Rick Bowles; Jeff Silbar	Greatest Hits Vol. II	1991	
"Then We Remember"	Don Cook; John Barlow Jarvis	Twentieth Century	1999	
"(There's A) Fire in the Night" †	Bob Corbin	Roll On	1984	
"There's No Way" †	Lisa Palas; Will Robinson; John Jarrard	40-Hour Week	1985	
"This Love's on Me"	Jeff Cook; P. J. Kimberlin; Ken Randolph; Rocky Lawrence	Cheap Seats	1993	
"Thistlehair The Christmas Bear"	Donny Lowery	Alabama Christmas	1985	
"Tied to the Music"		Wild Country	1976	
"T.L.C. A.S.A.P." †	Gary Baker; Frank J. Myers	Cheap Seats	1993	
"Tonight Is Christmas"	Keith Worsham; Stan Munsey, Jr. Don Matthews; Steve Baccus	Alabama Christmas	1985	
"Too Much Love"	Randy Owen; Greg Fowler	Twentieth Century	1999	
"Touch Me When We're Dancing" †	Terry Skinner; J.L. Wallace; Ken Bell	The Touch	1986	
"True, True Housewife"	Randy Owen	The Touch	1986	
"Try Me"		Wild Country	1976	
"Twentieth Century" †	Chris A.T. Cummings; Don Schlitz	Twentieth Century	1999	
"Until It Happens to You"	Jeff Cook; Teddy Gentry; Greg Fowler; Ronnie Rogers	Pass It on Down	1990	
"Vacation"	Randy Owen	The Touch	1986	
"Very Special Love"	Randy Owen; Teddy Gentry	The Closer You Get...	1983	
"We Can't Love Like This Anymore" †	John Jarrard; Wendell Mobley	Greatest Hits Vol. III	1994	
"We Made Love" †	Tom Douglas; Billy Kirsch	Twentieth Century	1999	
"What in the Name of Love"	Bill Boling, Chris Deal; Rick Wayne	The Closer You Get...	1983	
"What Will I Leave Behind"	Sherrill Brown	Songs of Inspiration	2006	
"When It All Goes South" †	Rick & Janis Carnes; John Barlow Jarvis	When It All Goes South	2001	
"When It Comes My Time"	Teddy Gentry	Songs of Inspiration II	2007	
"When It Comes to Christmas"	Randy Owen; Teddy Gentry; Ronnie Rogers	Christmas Vol. II	1996	
"When We Make Love" †	Troy Seals; Mentor Williams	Roll On	1984	
"Why Lady Why" †	Teddy Gentry; Richard Scott	The Alabama Band #3; My Home's in Alabama	1979; 1980	
"Will the Circle Be Unbroken?"	Ada R. Habershon; Charles H. Gabriel	Songs of Inspiration II	2007	
"Will You Marry Me" (featuring Jann Arden) †	Jeffrey Steele; Al Anderson	When It All Goes South	2001	
"Woman Back Home"	Donny Lowery	Feels So Right	1981	
"The Woman He Loves" †	Troy Seals; Eddie Setser	When It All Goes South	2001	
"Wonderful Waste of Time"	Jeff Cook; Lisa Cook; Rocko Heermance	When It All Goes South	2001	
"Words at Twenty Paces"	Hugh Moffatt	Mountain Music	1982	
"Write It Down in Blue"	Randy Owen; Teddy Gentry; Greg Fowler; Ronnie Rogers	Twentieth Century	1999	
"You Can't Take the Country Out of Me"	Rick Bowles; Robert Byrne	American Pride	1992	
"You Only Paint the Picture Once"	Randy Owen; Teddy Gentry; Greg Fowler; Ronnie Rogers	When It All Goes South	2001	
"You Turn Me On"	Randy Owen; Teddy Gentry	Mountain Music	1982	
"You're My Explanation for Living"	Randy Owen	Just Us	1987	
""You've Got" the Touch" †	Will Robinson; John Jarrard; Lisa Palas	The Touch	1986	

== See also ==
- Alabama discography

== Notes ==
=== Sources ===
- Erlewine, Stephen Thomas; Woodstra, Chris; Bogdanov, Vladimir; Erlewine, Michael (1997). All Music Guide to Country: The Experts' Guide to the Best Country Recordings. Backbeat Books. ISBN 978-0879304751.
- Stambler, Irwin; Landon, Grelun (2000). Country Music: The Encyclopedia. St. Martins Press. ISBN 978-0312151218.
