= Alabama discography =

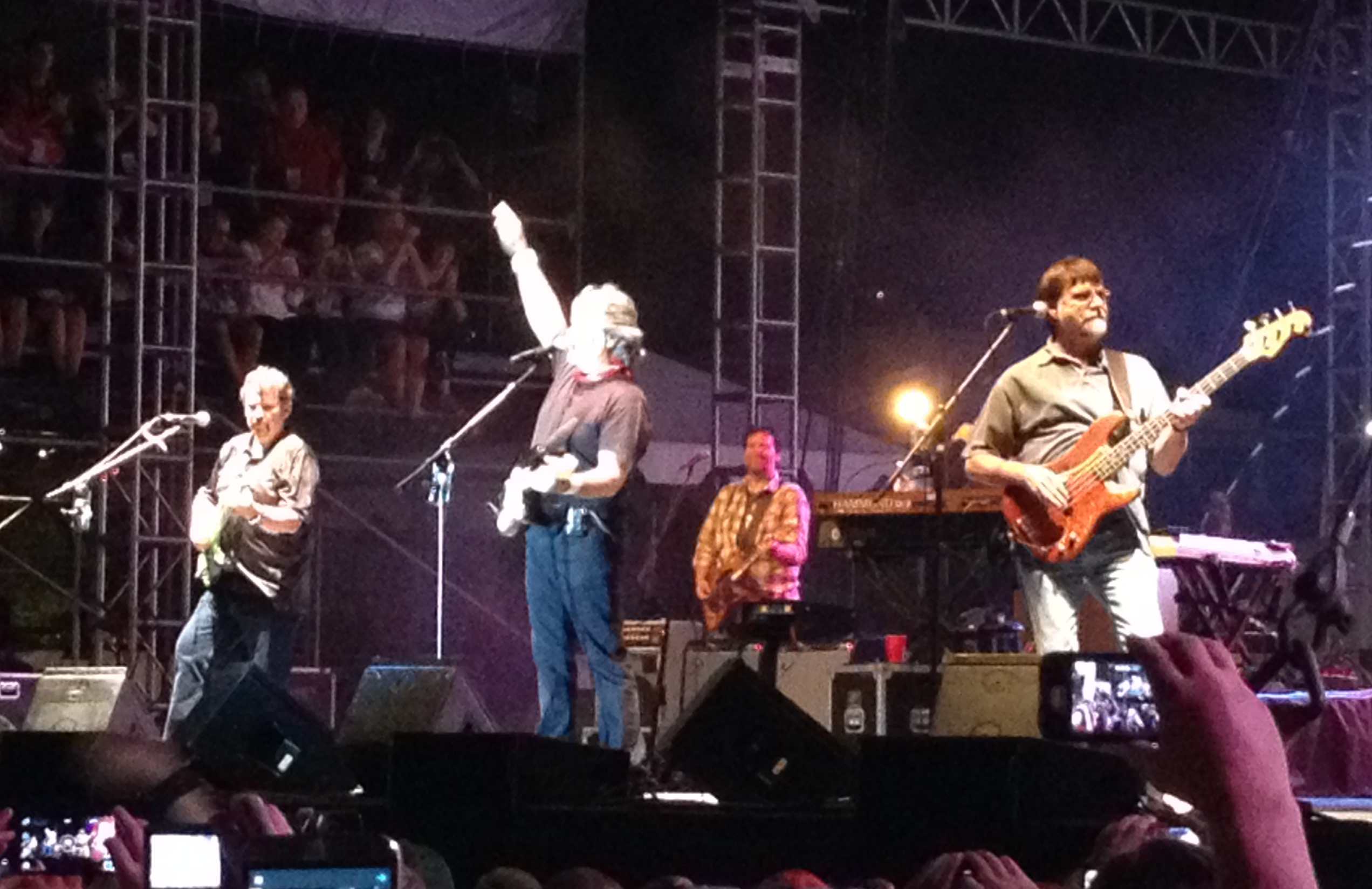
- Alabama in 2014
- Studio albums: 26
- Live albums: 6
- Compilation albums: 22
- Tribute albums: 1
- Singles: 74
- Music videos: 31

American country music band Alabama has released 26 studio albums, including 20 recorded for RCA Records. Alabama also charted 77 songs on the Billboard Hot Country Songs charts, of which 32 reached number one. The band's longest-lasting number one was "Jukebox in My Mind", which spent four weeks at that position in 1990. Several of the band's early-1980s releases also crossed over to the Billboard Hot 100 and Hot Adult Contemporary Tracks charts, including "Feels So Right", "Love in the First Degree", "Take Me Down", and "The Closer You Get", all of which reached top 40 on the Billboard Hot 100.

== Studio albums ==
=== 1970s ===
Title	Album details
Wild Country	Release date: 1976; Label: GRT Records; Format: LP, cassette
Deuces Wild	Release date: 1977; Label: MDJ Records; Format: LP, cassette
Alabama Band No. 3	Release date: 1979; Label: MDJ Records; Format: LP, cassette

=== 1980s ===
Title	Album details	Peak positions				Certifications
Title	Album details	US Country	US	CAN Country	CAN	Certifications
My Home's in Alabama	Release date: May 1980; Label: RCA Records; Format: LP, CD, cassette	3	71	1	—	RIAA: 2× Platinum
Feels So Right	Release date: February 1981; Label: RCA Records; Format: LP, CD, cassette	1	16	—	—	RIAA: 4× Platinum; CAN: Platinum
Mountain Music	Release date: February 1982; Label: RCA Records; Format: LP, CD, cassette	1	14	—	38	RIAA: 5× Platinum; CAN: Platinum
The Closer You Get...	Release date: March 1983; Label: RCA Records; Format: LP, CD, cassette	1	10	—	17	RIAA: 4× Platinum; CAN: Platinum
Roll On	Release date: January 1984; Label: RCA Records; Format: LP, CD, cassette	1	21	—	37	RIAA: 4× Platinum; CAN: 2× Platinum
40-Hour Week	Release date: January 1985; Label: RCA Records; Format: LP, CD, cassette	1	28	—	69	RIAA: 2× Platinum; CAN: Platinum
Alabama Christmas (Note: Alabama Christmas also peaked at number 1 on Top Holiday Albums.)	Release date: September 1985; Label: RCA Records; Format: LP, CD, cassette	8	75	—	—	RIAA: 2× Platinum; CAN: Platinum
The Touch	Release date: September 1986; Label: RCA Records; Format: LP, CD, cassette	1	42	—	88	RIAA: Platinum; CAN: Gold
Just Us	Release date: September 1987; Label: RCA Records; Format: LP, CD, cassette	1	55	—	—	RIAA: Platinum
Southern Star	Release date: February 1989; Label: RCA Records; Format: LP, CD, cassette	1	62	4	—	RIAA: Platinum
"—" denotes releases that did not chart

=== 1990s ===
Title	Album details	Peak positions				Certifications
Title	Album details	US Country	US	CAN Country	CAN	Certifications
Pass It On Down	Release date: May 21, 1990; Label: RCA Records; Format: LP, CD, cassette	3	57	—	—	RIAA: Platinum
American Pride	Release date: August 11, 1992; Label: RCA Records; Format: CD, cassette	11	46	4	62	RIAA: Platinum; CAN: Gold
Cheap Seats	Release date: October 12, 1993; Label: RCA Records; Format: CD, cassette	16	76	4	—	RIAA: Platinum; CAN: Gold
In Pictures	Release date: August 15, 1995; Label: RCA Records; Format: CD, cassette	12	100	10	—	RIAA: Platinum
Christmas Vol. II (Note: Alabama Christmas Vol. II also peaked at number 7 on Top Holiday Albums.)	Release date: September 17, 1996; Label: RCA Records; Format: CD, cassette	18	177	—	—	RIAA: Gold
Dancin' on the Boulevard	Release date: April 8, 1997; Label: RCA Records; Format: CD, cassette	5	55	2	—	RIAA: Platinum
Twentieth Century	Release date: June 15, 1999; Label: RCA Records; Format: CD, cassette	5	51	5	—	RIAA: Gold
"—" denotes releases that did not chart

=== 2000s and 2010s ===
Title	Album details	Peak positions		
Title	Album details	US Country	US	US Christ
When It All Goes South	Release date: January 9, 2001; Label: RCA Records; Format: CD, cassette	4	37	—
Songs of Inspiration	Release date: October 24, 2006; Label: RCA Records; Format: CD, music download	1	15	1
Songs of Inspiration II	Release date: March 27, 2007; Label: RCA Records; Format: CD, music download	3	33	1
Angels Among Us: Hymns & Gospel Favorites	Release date: September 8, 2014; Label: Gaither Music Group; Format: CD, music download	6	33	2
Southern Drawl	Release date: September 18, 2015; Label: BMG Chrysalis; Format: CD, music download	2	14	—
American Christmas (Note: American Christmas peaked at number 4 on Top Holiday Albums.)	Release date: October 6, 2017; Label: BMG Chrysalis; Format: CD, music download	—	—	—
"—" denotes releases that did not chart

== Compilation albums ==
=== 1980s and 1990s ===
Title	Album details	Peak positions				Certifications
Title	Album details	US Country	US	CAN Country	CAN	Certifications
Alabama: Wild Country	Release date: June, 1982; Label: Plantation Records; Format: LP, cassette	—	—	—	—	
Greatest Hits	Release date: January, 1986; Label: RCA Records; Format: LP, CD, cassette	1	24	—	64	RIAA: 5× Platinum; CAN: Platinum
Greatest Hits Vol. II	Release date: October 8, 1991; Label: RCA Records; Format: CD, cassette	10	72	13	—	RIAA: Platinum
For Our Fans	Release date: August 13, 1993; Label: RCA Records; Format: CD, cassette	—	—	2	48	CAN: Gold
Christmas with The Judds and Alabama (with The Judds)	Release date: August 16, 1994; Label: RCA Records; Format: CD, cassette	61	—	—	—	
Greatest Hits Vol. III	Release date: September 27, 1994; Label: RCA Records; Format: CD, cassette	8	56	—	—	RIAA: 2× Platinum
Super Hits	Release date: May 21, 1996; Label: RCA Records; Format: CD, cassette	46	—	—	—	RIAA: Platinum
Born Country	Release date: November 18, 1997; Label: BMG Special Products; Format: CD, cassette	75	—	—	—	
Super Hits II	Release date: March 24, 1998; Label: RCA Records; Format: CD, cassette	59	—	—	—	
The Essential Alabama	Release date: June 2, 1998; Label: RCA Records; Format: CD, cassette	63	—	—	—	RIAA: Gold
For the Record	Release date: August 25, 1998; Label: RCA Records; Format: CD, cassette	2	13	4	—	RIAA: 5× Platinum; CAN: 2× Platinum
"—" denotes releases that did not chart

=== 2000s and 2010s ===
Title	Album details	Peak positions		
Title	Album details	US Country	US	CAN
In the Mood: The Love Songs	Release date: February 4, 2003; Label: RCA Records; Format: CD, music download	4	15	—
The American Farewell Tour	Release date: October 7, 2003; Label: RCA Records; Format: CD, music download	6	64	—
The Ultimate Alabama	Release date: October 12, 2004; Label: RCA Records; Format: CD, music download	10	52	—
The Essential Alabama	Release date: May 17, 2005; Label: RCA Records; Format: CD, music download	52	—	—
Livin' Lovin' Rockin' Rollin': The 25th Anniversary Collection	Release date: January 31, 2006; Label: RCA Records; Format: CD, music download	28	120	—
Christmas Collection	Release date: August 15, 2006; Label: Madacy Entertainment; Format: CD	62	—	—
16 Biggest Hits	Release date: March 27, 2007; Label: Legacy Recordings; Format: CD, music download	40	—	—
Playlist: The Very Best of Alabama	Release date: April 29, 2008; Label: Legacy Recordings; Format: CD, music download	68	—	—
Mountain Music: The Best of Alabama	Release date: November 23, 2009; Label: RCA Camden; Format: CD, music download	—	—	85
Country: Alabama	Release date: 2013; Label: Legacy Recordings; Format: CD, music download	59	—	—
The Classic Christmas Album (Note: The Classic Country Album also peaked at number 17 on Top Holiday Albums.)	Release date: October 8, 2013; Label: Legacy Recordings; Format: CD, music download	46	—	—
"—" denotes releases that did not chart

== Live albums ==
Title	Album details	Peak positions		Certifications
Title	Album details	US Country	US	Certifications
Alabama Live	Release date: 1988; Label: RCA Records; Format: LP, CD, music download	1	76	RIAA: Platinum
Gonna Have a Party... Live	Release date: February 23, 1993; Label: RCA Records; Format: CD, cassette	—	—	
The Last Stand	Release date: November 13, 2007; Label: Cracker Barrel; Format: CD	—	—	
Setlist: The Very Best of Alabama Live	Release date: July 13, 2010; Label: Legacy Recordings; Format: CD, music download	72	—	
Alabama & Friends At the Ryman	Release date: September 30, 2014; Label: Eagle Rock Entertainment; Format: CD, music download	29	—	
Live On The Road	Release date: September 18, 2015; Label: BMG Chrysalis; Format: CD	—	—	
"—" denotes releases that did not chart

== Tribute albums ==
Title	Album details	Peak positions	
Title	Album details	US Country	US
Alabama & Friends	Release date: August 27, 2013; Label: Show Dog-Universal Music; Format: CD, music download	2	8

== Singles ==
=== 1970s and 1980s ===
Year	Single	Peak positions					Certifications (sales threshold)	Album
Year	Single	US Country	US	US AC	CAN Country	CAN AC	Certifications (sales threshold)	Album
1977	"I Wanna Be with You Tonight"	78	—	—	—	—		Deuces Wild
1979	"I Wanna Come Over"	33	—	—	—	—		My Home's in Alabama
1980	"My Home's in Alabama"	17	—	—	—	—		My Home's in Alabama
1980	"Tennessee River"	1	—	—	1	—		My Home's in Alabama
1980	"Why Lady Why"	1	—	—	3	—		My Home's in Alabama
1981	"Old Flame"	1	— (Note: "Old Flame" did not enter the Hot 100, but peaked at number 3 on Bubbling Under Hot 100 Singles.)	—	1	—		Feels So Right
1981	"Feels So Right" (Note: "Feels So Right" also peaked at number 37 on the Dutch Single Top 100 chart.)	1	20	9	5	1	RIAA: Gold	Feels So Right
1981	"Love in the First Degree"	1	15	5	1	1		Feels So Right
1982	"Mountain Music"	1	— (Note: "Mountain Music" did not enter the Hot 100, but peaked at number 1 on Bubbling Under Hot 100 Singles.)	—	1	1	RIAA: Platinum	Mountain Music
1982	"Take Me Down"	1	18	5	1	1		Mountain Music
1982	"Close Enough to Perfect"	1	65	—	1	—		Mountain Music
1982	"Christmas in Dixie" (Note: The original 1982 release of "Christmas in Dixie" was a double A-side with "Christmas Is Just a Song for Us This Year" by Louise Mandrell and R.C. Bannon.)	35 (Note: "Christmas in Dixie" charted at number 47 in 1997, number 40 in 1998, and number 39 in 1999.)	—	—	—	—		Alabama Christmas
1983	"Dixieland Delight"	1	—	—	1	—	RIAA: Platinum	The Closer You Get...
1983	"The Closer You Get"	1	38	9	1	1		The Closer You Get...
1983	"Lady Down on Love"	1	76	18	1	10		The Closer You Get...
1984	"Roll On (Eighteen Wheeler)"	1	—	—	1	—	RIAA: Gold	Roll On
1984	"When We Make Love"	1	72	8	1	3		Roll On
1984	"If You're Gonna Play in Texas (You Gotta Have a Fiddle in the Band)"	1	—	—	1	—	RIAA: Platinum	Roll On
1984	"(There's A) Fire in the Night"	1	—	—	1	—		Roll On
1985	"There's No Way"	1	—	32	2	—		40 Hour Week
1985	"40 Hour Week (For a Livin')"	1	—	—	1	—		40 Hour Week
1985	"Can't Keep a Good Man Down"	1	—	—	1	—		40 Hour Week
1986	"She and I"	1	—	—	1	—		Greatest Hits
1986	"Touch Me When We're Dancing"	1	—	—	1	—		The Touch
1987	""You've Got" the Touch"	1	—	—	1	—		The Touch
1987	"Tar Top"	7	—	—	4	—		Just Us
1987	"Face to Face" (with K. T. Oslin; uncredited)	1	—	—	1	—		Just Us
1988	"Fallin' Again"	1	—	—	1	—		Just Us
1988	"Song of the South"	1	—	—	1	—	RIAA: 2× Platinum; RMNZ: Gold	Southern Star
1989	"If I Had You"	1	—	—	1	—		Southern Star
1989	"High Cotton"	1	—	—	1	—		Southern Star
1989	"Southern Star"	1	—	—	1	—		Southern Star
"—" denotes releases that did not chart

=== 1990s ===
Year	Single	Peak positions				Certifications (sales threshold)	Album
Year	Single	US Country	US	US AC	CAN Country	Certifications (sales threshold)	Album
1990	"Pass It On Down"	3	—	—	2		Pass It On Down
1990	"Jukebox in My Mind"	1	—	—	1		Pass It On Down
1990	"Forever's as Far as I'll Go"	1	—	14	3		Pass It On Down
1991	"Down Home"	1	—	—	1		Pass It On Down
1991	"Here We Are"	2	—	—	3		Pass It On Down
1991	"Then Again"	4	—	33	6		Greatest Hits Vol. II
1991	"Born Country"	2	—	—	2		Greatest Hits Vol. II
1992	"Take a Little Trip"	2	—	—	2		American Pride
1992	"I'm in a Hurry (And Don't Know Why)"	1	—	—	1	RIAA: Platinum	American Pride
1992	"Once Upon a Lifetime"	3	—	—	2		American Pride
1993	"Hometown Honeymoon"	3	—	—	1		American Pride
1993	"Reckless"	1	— (Note: "Reckless" did not enter the Hot 100, but peaked at number 23 on Bubbling Under Hot 100 Singles.)	—	1		Cheap Seats
1993	"T.L.C. A.S.A.P."	7	—	—	3		Cheap Seats
1993	"Angels Among Us"	28 (Note: "Angels Among Us" peaked at number 53 in 1993 and number 28 in 1994.)	— (Note: "Angels Among Us" did not enter the Hot 100, but peaked at number 22 on Bubbling Under Hot 100 Singles.)	—	—	RIAA: Gold	Cheap Seats
1994	"The Cheap Seats"	13	—	—	6		Cheap Seats
1994	"We Can't Love Like This Anymore"	6	—	—	7		Greatest Hits Vol. III
1994	"Give Me One More Shot"	3	—	—	3		Greatest Hits Vol. III
1995	"She Ain't Your Ordinary Girl"	2	—	—	1		In Pictures
1995	"In Pictures"	4	— (Note: "In Pictures" did not enter the Hot 100, but peaked at number 18 on Bubbling Under Hot 100 Singles.)	—	3		In Pictures
1996	"It Works"	19	—	—	17		In Pictures
1996	"Say I"	38	—	—	18		In Pictures
1996	"The Maker Said Take Her"	4	—	—	13		In Pictures
1997	"Sad Lookin' Moon"	2	—	—	1		Dancin' on the Boulevard
1997	"Dancin', Shaggin' on the Boulevard"	3	—	—	4		Dancin' on the Boulevard
1997	"Of Course I'm Alright"	22	—	—	23		Dancin' on the Boulevard
1998	"She's Got That Look in Her Eyes"	21	—	—	10		Dancin' on the Boulevard
1998	"How Do You Fall in Love"	2	82	—	9		For the Record
1998	"Keepin' Up"	14	69	—	8		For the Record
1999	"God Must Have Spent a Little More Time on You" (featuring 'N Sync)	3	29	—	1		Twentieth Century
1999	"Small Stuff"	24	— (Note: "Small Stuff" did not enter the Hot 100, but peaked at number on Bubbling Under Hot 100 Singles.)	—	25		Twentieth Century
"—" denotes releases that did not chart

=== 2000s-2020s ===
Year	Single	Peak positions			Album
Year	Single	US Country	US	CAN Country	Album
2000	"Twentieth Century"	51	—	68	Twentieth Century
2000	"We Made Love"	63	—	—	Twentieth Century
2000	"When It All Goes South"	15	— (Note: "When It All Goes South" did not enter the Hot 100, but peaked at number 10 on Bubbling Under Hot 100 Singles.)	—	When It All Goes South
2001	"Will You Marry Me" (with Jann Arden; uncredited)	41	—	—	When It All Goes South
2002	"The Woman He Loves"	—	—	—	When It All Goes South
2002	"I'm in the Mood"	48	—	—	In the Mood: The Love Songs
2010	"Are You Sure Hank Done It This Way"	53	—	—	The Music Inside: A Collaboration; Dedicated to Waylon Jennings
2013	"All American"	— (Note: "All American" did not enter Hot Country Songs, but peaked at number 58 on Billboard Country Indicator.)	—	—	Alabama & Friends
2015	"Wasn't Through Lovin' You Yet"	—	—	—	Southern Drawl
2016	"Come Find Me" (with Alison Krauss)	—	—	—	Southern Drawl
2023	"Jesus and John Wayne" (featuring The Oak Ridge Boys)	—	—	—	Gaither Tribute: Award-Winning Artists Honor the Songs of Bill & Gloria Gaither
"—" denotes releases that did not chart

=== As a featured artist ===
Year	Single	Peak positions							Certifications	Album
Year	Single	US Country	US Country Airplay	US	US AC	CAN Country (Note: Peak for "Deep River Woman" per Country Tracks (RPM); peak for "Forever Country" per Canada Country (Billboard).)	CAN (Note: Peak for "Deep River Woman" per Top Singles (RPM); peaks for "Old Alabama" and "Forever Country" per Canadian Hot 100 (Billboard).)	AUS	Certifications	Album
1987	"Deep River Woman" (Lionel Richie with Alabama)	10		71	28	10	10	—		Dancing on the Ceiling
2011	"Old Alabama" (Brad Paisley featuring Alabama)	1		38	—	—	41	—	RIAA: Platinum	This Is Country Music
2016	"Forever Country" (as Artists of Then, Now & Forever)	1	33	21	—	39	25	26	RIAA: Gold	Non-album single
"—" denotes releases that did not chart

== Charted B-sides ==
Year	B-side	Peak positions	Original A-side
Year	B-side	US Country	Original A-side
1984	"I'm Not That Way Anymore"	— (Note: "I'm Not That Way Anymore" was credited as a double A-side to "If You're Gonna Play in Texas" during that song's first two weeks on the charts only.)	"If You're Gonna Play in Texas (You Gotta Have a Fiddle in the Band)"
2000	"New Year's Eve 1999" (with Gretchen Peters)	55	"Twentieth Century"

== Other charted songs ==
Year	Single	Peak positions	Album
Year	Single	US Country	Album
1995	"Sweet Home Alabama"	75	Skynyrd Frynds
1997	"The Blessings"	72	Alabama Christmas Vol. II
1999	"Santa Claus (I Still Believe in You)"	71	Alabama Christmas
1999	"Rockin' Around the Christmas Tree"	64	Alabama Christmas Vol. II
"—" denotes releases that did not chart

== Music videos ==
Year	Video	Director
1981	"Old Flame"	Marc Ball
1981	"Feels So Right"	Marc Ball
1982	"Mountain Music"	Marc Ball
1982	"Take Me Down"	Marc Ball
1983	"Dixieland Delight"	David Hogan
1983	"The Closer You Get"	David Hogan
1984	"I'm Not That Way Anymore"	David Hogan
1984	"(There's A) Fire in the Night"	David Hogan
1985	"There's No Way"	David Hogan
1985	"40 Hour Week (For a Livin')"	David Hogan
1985	"Can't Keep a Good Man Down"	David Hogan
1986	"She and I"	David Hogan
1986	"Touch Me When We're Dancing"	Marc Ball
1987	"Tar Top"	David Hogan
1988	"Song of the South"	Steve Boyle
1989	"High Cotton"	Jack Cole
1990	"Pass It On Down"	Jack Cole
1992	"Richard Petty Fans"	
1992	"I'm in a Hurry (And Don't Know Why)"	Deaton Flanigen
1994	"The Cheap Seats"	Deaton Flanigen
1994	"Angels Among Us"	Deaton Flanigen
1996	"It Works"	Deaton Flanigen
1997	"Dancin', Shaggin' on the Boulevard"	Deaton Flanigen
1998	"She's Got That Look in Her Eyes"	Tom Bevins
1998	"How Do You Fall in Love"	Brent Hedgecock
1999	"God Must Have Spent a Little More Time on You" (with 'N Sync)	Brent Hedgecock
2000	"When It All Goes South"	Brent Hedgecock
2002	"I'm in the Mood"	David McClister
2010	"Are You Sure Hank Done It This Way"	David Poag
2011	"Old Alabama" (with Brad Paisley)	Jim Shea
2016	"Forever Country" (as Artists of Then, Now and Forever)	Joseph Kahn
