= 16 Biggest Hits (Alabama album) =

2007 compilation album by the American band, Alabama

Greatest hits album by Alabama
- Released: March 27, 2007
- Genre: Country
- Length: 58:02
- Label: RCA Nashville, Legacy

Alabama chronology
Songs of Inspiration II (2007)	16 Biggest Hits (2007)	Playlist: The Very Best of Alabama (2008)

Professional ratings
Review scores
Source	Rating
AllMusic	3/5 stars

16 Biggest Hits is a 2007 Alabama compilation album. It is part of a series of similar 16 Biggest Hits albums released by Legacy Recordings. It has sold 384,000 copies in the US as of May 2013.

== Track listing ==
No.	Title	Writer(s)	Length
1.	"Mountain Music"	Randy Owen	4:12
2.	"Song of the South"	Bob McDill	3:11
3.	"Love in the First Degree"	Tim DuBois, Jim Hurt	3:19
4.	"If You're Gonna Play in Texas (You Gotta Have a Fiddle in the Band)"	Murry Kellum, Dan Mitchell	3:23
5.	"Born Country"	Byron Hill, John Schweers	3:18
6.	"Feels So Right"	Owen	3:36
7.	"The Closer You Get"	Mark Gray, J.P. Pennington	3:36
8.	"She and I"	Dave Loggins	5:17
9.	"Fallin' Again"	Greg Fowler, Teddy Gentry, Owen	3:59
10.	"Roll On (Eighteen Wheeler)"	Loggins	4:26
11.	"Jukebox in My Mind"	Dave Gibson, Ronnie Rogers	3:40
12.	"Down Home"	Rick Bowles, Josh Leo	3:28
13.	"I'm in a Hurry (And Don't Know Why)"	Roger Murrah, Randy VanWarmer	2:49
14.	"Can't Keep a Good Man Down"	Bob Corbin	3:39
15.	"Southern Star"	Rich Alves, Steve Dean, Murrah	3:09
16.	"High Cotton"	Scott Anders, Murrah	3:00

== Chart performance ==
16 Biggest Hits peaked at #40 on the U.S. Billboard Top Country Albums chart the week of August 16, 2008.

Chart (2007–2008)	Peak position
U.S. Billboard Top Country Albums	40

== Certifications ==
Certifications for 16 Biggest Hits
Region	Certification	Certified units/sales
United States (RIAA)	Gold	500,000^{‡}
^{‡} Sales+streaming figures based on certification alone.
