= Southern Drawl (album) =

2015 album by Alabama

Studio album by Alabama
- Released: September 18, 2015
- Genre: Country
- Length: 51:53
- Label: BMG Chrysalis
- Producer: Jeff Cook; Randy Owen; Teddy Gentry

Alabama chronology
Angels Among Us: Hymns and Gospel Favorites (2014)	Southern Drawl (2015)	American Christmas (2017)

Southern Drawl is the twenty-third studio album by American country music group Alabama, and their first new studio album of original materials since When It All Goes South in 2001. The album was released on September 18, 2015, with lead single "Wasn't Through Lovin' You Yet" released the same month. The track "One on One" previously appeared on lead singer Randy Owen's 2008 album of the same name.

== Critical reception ==
Stephen Thomas Erlewine of AllMusic criticized some tracks, including the title track, "Hillbilly Wins the Lotto Money", "I Wanna Be There", and "American Farmer" as "trying too hard", but added that "Such down-the-middle numbers overshadow much subtler and nicer moments scattered throughout the record, moments that usually arrive in the soft, sweet ballads that give the group plenty of opportunity to showcase its gentle, interwoven harmonies. These slow tunes more than the over-pumped rockers feel the truest to old Alabama."

== Commercial performance ==
The album debuted at No. 2 on the Top Country Albums chart, and No. 14 on the Billboard 200, selling 20,900 copies in its debut week in the US. The album had sold 68,900 copies in the US as of January 2016.

== Track listing ==
No.	Title	Writer(s)	Length
1.	"Southern Drawl"	Damon Carroll, Chip Davis, Randy Owen, Ronnie Rogers	4:26
2.	"Wasn't Through Lovin' You Yet"	Tony Lane, David Lee	4:03
3.	"This Ain't Just a Song"	Tim James, Rivers Rutherford, George Teren	4:02
4.	"As Long as There's Love"	R. Owen	4:07
5.	"Back to the Country"	R. Owen, Rogers, Teddy Gentry, Josh Leo	3:25
6.	"Hillbilly Wins the Lotto Money"	Heath Owen	4:13
7.	"Come Find Me" (With Alison Krauss)	Lane, Lee	4:04
8.	"No Bad Days"	Jeff Cook, Patrick Davis, Ray Johnston, James Otto, James T. Slater, Django Walker	4:23
9.	"One on One"	R. Owen	3:31
10.	"American Farmer"	Gentry, R. Owen, Rogers, Charles English, Dave Gibson	4:57
11.	"It's About Time"	English, Gentry, Gibson	3:28
12.	"Footstompin' Music"	R. Owen, H. Owen	4:04
13.	"I Wanna Be There"	Harley Allen, Paul Overstreet	3:10
Total length:			51:53

Deluxe edition from Cracker Barrel
No.	Title	Length
14.	"Backwoods Boogie"	3:42
15.	"I've Got Some Lovin'"	3:45

== Personnel ==
Alabama

- Jeff Cook – lead guitar, lead vocals (track 8), backing vocals
- Teddy Gentry – bass, lead vocals (tracks 11, and 15), backing vocals
- Randy Owen – rhythm guitar, acoustic guitar, lead vocals, backing vocals

Additional musicians

- Tom Bukovac – guitars
- Chris Carmichael – string arrangements, strings
- Damon Carroll – backing vocals
- Lisa Cook – backing vocals
- J.T. Corenflos – guitars
- Billy Davis – backing vocals
- Chip Davis – backing vocals
- Charles English – guitars, acoustic guitar, backing vocals
- Larry Franklin – fiddle, mandolin
- Kenny Greenberg – guitars
- Charlie Judge – horns
- Joel Key – banjo, acoustic guitar
- Randall Key – trumpet
- Alison Krauss – fiddle and vocals on "Come Find Me"
- Greg Morrow – drums
- Gordon Mote – Hammond B-3 organ, piano, Wurlitzer, backing vocals
- Jim Nelson – saxophone
- Angela Primm – background vocals
- Danny Rader – acoustic guitar
- Adam Shoenfeld – guitars
- Jimmie Lee Sloas – bass, backing vocals
- Jason Spencer – backing vocals
- Jimmy Stewart – dobro, fiddle
- Doug Stokes – percussion
- Bryan Sutton – dobro, acoustic guitar
- Wanda Vick – banjo
- Glenn Worf – bass

Production

- Alan Messer – photography

== Charts ==
=== Weekly charts ===
Chart (2015)	Peak position
US Billboard 200	14
US Top Country Albums (Billboard)	2
US Independent Albums (Billboard)	2

=== Year-end charts ===
Chart (2015)	Position
US Top Country Albums (Billboard)	56
