= In the Mood: The Love Songs =

2003 album by the American band, Alabama

Compilation album by Alabama
- Released: February 4, 2003
- Genre: Country
- Length: 89:50
- Label: RCA Nashville
- Producer: Various

Alabama chronology
When It All Goes South (2001)	In the Mood: The Love Songs (2003)	The American Farewell Tour (2003)

In the Mood: The Love Songs is a two-disc compilation album from the group Alabama. It was released in 2003. The album includes the newly recorded tracks "I'm in the Mood" and "The Living Years" (a cover of Mike + The Mechanics). Don Cook and Alabama produced these new tracks, while the other tracks have various original producers.

== Critical reception ==
Heather Phares of Allmusic rated the compilation 3 stars out of 5, saying that it "is a consistent collection of the band's easygoing, sentimental songs, and while it doesn't replace a more straightforward greatest-hits compilation, it should please the band's fans as well as anyone partial to romantic country." Deborah Evans Price of Billboard reviewed "I'm in the Mood" favorably, saying that it "has a slow, sultry groove that showcases lead vocalist Randy Owen's warm, honey-smooth Southern voice."

== Track listing ==
=== Disc one ===
1. "I'm in the Mood" (Lewis Anderson, Ronnie Rogers) — 3:39
2. "The Living Years" (Mike Rutherford, B. A. Robertson) — 6:07
3. "When We Make Love" (Troy Seals, Mentor Williams) — 3:37
4. "Touch Me When We're Dancing" (Ken Belly, Terry Skinner, J. L. Wallace) — 3:42
5. "Feels So Right" (Randy Owen) — 3:35
6. "How Do You Fall in Love" (Greg Fowler, Teddy Gentry, Owen) — 3:01
7. "Fallin' Again" (Fowler, Gentry, Owen) — 7:43
8. "Lady Down on Love" (Owen) — 3:59
9. "The Closer You Get" (Mark Gray, J. P. Pennington) — 3:35
10. "If I Had You" (Kerry Chater, Danny "Bear" Mayo) — 3:34
11. "We Can't Love Like This Anymore" (John Jarrard, Wendell Mobley) — 3:17
12. "Then Again" (Rick Bowles, Jeff Silbar) — 3:44

=== Disc two ===
1. "Here We Are" (Beth Nielsen Chapman, Vince Gill) - 2:52
2. "Face to Face" (Owen) — 3:02
3. "Take Me Down" (Gray, Pennington) — 3:44
4. "In Pictures" (Bobby Boyd, Joe Doyle) — 3:33
5. "Close Enough to Perfect" (Carl Chambers) — 3:34
6. "Forever's as Far as I'll Go" (Mike Reid) — 3:35
7. "Love in the First Degree" (Tim DuBois, Jim Hurt) — 3:19
8. "There's No Way" (Jarrard, Lisa Palas, Will Robinson) — 4:13
9. "God Must Have Spent a Little More Time on You" (Carl Sturken, Evan Rogers) — 4:39
  - featuring 'N Sync
10. "Nothing Comes Closer" (Rogers) — 3:30
11. "Once Upon a Lifetime" (Gary Baker, Frank J. Myers) — 4:16

== Personnel ==
Alabama

- Jeff Cook- electric guitar, background vocals
- Teddy Gentry- bass guitar, background vocals
- Mark Herndon- drums
- Randy Owen- lead vocals

Additional Musicians

- Mark Casstevens- acoustic guitar
- J. T. Corenflos- electric guitar
- Shannon Forrest- drums, drum loop, shaker
- David Hungate- bass guitar
- John Barlow Jarvis- Hammond organ

== Chart performance ==
=== Weekly charts ===
Chart (2003)	Peak position
US Billboard 200	15
US Top Country Albums (Billboard)	4

=== Year-end charts ===
Chart (2003)	Position
US Top Country Albums (Billboard)	40

=== Singles ===
Year	Single	US Country
2002	"I'm in the Mood"	48
