= When It All Goes South =

2001 album by Alabama

Studio album by Alabama
- Released: January 16, 2001
- Genre: Country
- Length: 59:35
- Label: RCA Nashville
- Producer: Alabama; Don Cook; Josh Leo; Larry Michael Lee; James Stroud; Rick Hall; Michael Omartian; Teddy Gentry; Randy Owen

Alabama chronology
Twentieth Century (1999)	When It All Goes South (2001)	In The Mood: The Love Songs (2003)

Professional ratings
Aggregate scores
Source	Rating
Metacritic	48/100
Review scores
Source	Rating
CDNow	2/5 stars
Launch.com	2/5 stars
Sonicnet	4/5 stars
Wall of Sound	1/5 stars

When It All Goes South is the nineteenth studio album by American country music band Alabama, released in 2001. It produced the singles "When It All Goes South", "Will You Marry Me" and "The Woman He Loves". This became Alabama's final studio album of original materials until 2015's Southern Drawl. It ranked at number 37 on the Billboard 200 and number four on the Country Albums Chart.

== Commercial performance ==
When It All Goes South became the group's highest sales peak of their career (since 1991), opening at 38,000 units, which proved higher sales than Twentieth Century, which it last opened at 33,000 copies. This placed the album at number four on the Billboard Top Country Albums Chart and number 37 on the Billboard 200. Overall, it has spent eight weeks on the Billboard 200 chart and 28 weeks in the country chart.

== Track listing ==
No.	Title	Writer(s)	Length
1.	"When It All Goes South"	Rick Carnes, Janis Carnes, John Barlow Jarvis	6:57
2.	"The Woman He Loves"	Troy Seals, Eddie Setser	3:55
3.	"Clear Across America Tonight"	Randy Owen, Teddy Gentry, Ronnie Rogers, Greg Fowler	3:22
4.	"Will You Marry Me" (featuring Jann Arden)	Jeffrey Steele, Al Anderson	3:16
5.	"I Can't Hide My Heart"	Owen, Gentry, Rogers, Fowler	3:10
6.	"I Can't Love You Any Less"	Owen, Gentry, Rogers, Fowler	3:38
7.	"Reinvent the Wheel"	Walt Aldridge, Brad Crisler	3:29
8.	"I Write a Little"	Jeff Cook, Owen, Rogers	4:16
9.	"Down This Road"	Michael Dulaney, Michael Lunn	3:23
10.	"Love Remains" (featuring Christopher Cross)	Randy Goodrum, Rob Mathes	4:34
11.	"Start Living"	Steven Dale Jones, Amy Powers	4:17
12.	"Simple as That"	Chapin Hartford	3:45
13.	"You Only Paint the Picture Once"	Owen, Gentry, Rogers, Fowler	3:33
14.	"Wonderful Waste of Time"	Cook, Lisa Cook, Rocko Heermance	3:19
15.	"Right Where I Am"	Owen, Gentry, Rogers, Fowler	4:34
16.	"Second Chances"	Skip Ewing, Bob DiPiero	3:59

== Personnel ==
Alabama

- Jeff Cook- background vocals, electric guitar; lead vocals on "Wonderful Waste of Time"
- Teddy Gentry- background vocals, bass guitar; lead vocals on "Love Remains"
- Randy Owen- lead vocals, background vocals

Alabama's drummer, Mark Herndon, does not play on the album.

Additional Musicians

- Tim Akers- keyboards
- Jann Arden- vocals on "Will You Marry Me"
- Eddie Bayers- drums
- Dennis Burnside- B-3 organ, keyboards, piano
- Trinecia Butler- background vocals
- Larry Byrom- acoustic guitar, electric guitar
- Rick Carnes- keyboards
- Mark Casstevens- acoustic guitar
- Christopher Cross- vocals on "Love Remains"
- Dan Dugmore- steel guitar
- Shannon Forrest- drums, percussion
- Larry Franklin- fiddle, mandolin
- Paul Franklin- steel guitar
- Steve Gibson- electric guitar
- Rick Hall- electric mandolin, percussion
- Larry Hanson- electric guitar, trumpet
- John Hobbs- keyboards, piano
- Jim Horn- saxophone
- John Barlow Jarvis- keyboards
- Wayne Jackson - trumpet
- Jeff King- electric guitar
- Josh Leo- acoustic guitar, electric guitar
- Andrew Love- tenor saxophone
- Brent Mason- electric guitar
- Mac McAnally- acoustic guitar
- Chris McHugh- drums
- Terry McMillan- harmonica, percussion
- Jerry McPherson- bouzouki, electric guitar, electric sitar
- Wendell Mobley- background vocals
- Greg Morrow- drums, percussion
- Steve Nathan- B-3 organ, keyboards, piano, synthesizer
- James Nelson- saxophone
- Floyd S. Newman- baritone saxophone
- Jimmy Nichols- piano, synthesizer
- Michael Omartian- piano, keyboards
- Dean "Dino" Pastin- harmonica, keyboards, saxophone
- Bob Patin- B-3 organ, keyboards, synthesizer, synth flute
- Michael Rhodes- bass guitar
- Tom Roady- percussion
- Brent Rowan- electric guitar, electric sitar
- John Wesley Ryles- background vocals
- Scotty Sanders- steel guitar
- Michael Severs- electric guitar
- Cindy Shelton- background vocals
- Brian D. Siewert- synth strings
- Lisa Silver- background vocals
- Jimmie Lee Sloas- bass guitar
- Michael Spriggs- acoustic guitar
- Don Srygley- electric guitar, percussion
- James Stroud- drums
- Harvey Thompson- tenor saxophone
- Cindy Walker- background vocals
- Christopher Walters- keyboards
- Biff Watson- bouzouki, acoustic guitar
- Glenn Worf- bass guitar
- Bob Wray - bass guitar

Voices on "I Write a Little" by Chris DeCarlo, Greg Fowler, Keith Gale, Sam Harrell, Adrian Michaels, Darcy Miller, Dan Nelson, Mike Siris, Suzette Tucker, and Mike Wilson; Military Advisor: LTC James (Jim) E. Pyle U.S. Army (Ret.)

Production

- Alabama (all tracks except "Love Remains" and "The Woman He Loves")
- Don Cook ("Wonderful Waste of Time", "I Write a Little", "Simple as That", "When It All Goes South")
- Josh Leo and Larry Michael Lee ("Right Where I Am", "I Can't Love You Any Less", "Clear Across America Tonight")
- James Stroud ("Will You Marry Me", "You Only Paint the Picture Once", "I Can't Hide My Heart")
- Rick Hall ("Reinvent the Wheel", "Start Living", "Down This Road")
- Michael Omartian and Teddy Gentry ("Love Remains")
- Teddy Gentry and Randy Owen ("The Woman He Loves")

== Chart performance ==
=== Weekly charts ===
Chart (2001)	Peak position
US Billboard 200	37
US Top Country Albums (Billboard)	4

=== Year-end charts ===
Chart (2001)	Position
US Top Country Albums (Billboard)	45

=== Singles ===
Year	Single	Peak positions	
Year	Single	US Country	US
2000	"When It All Goes South"	15	110
2001	"Will You Marry Me"	41	—
2001	"The Woman He Loves"	—	—
