= Twentieth Century (Alabama album) =

1999 album by Alabama

Studio album by Alabama
- Released: June 15, 1999
- Studio: Soundshop Recording Studios (Nashville, Tennessee)
- Genre: Country
- Length: 45:36
- Label: RCA Nashville
- Producer: Alabama; Don Cook

Alabama chronology
For the Record (1998)	Twentieth Century (1999)	When It All Goes South (2001)

Twentieth Century is the eighteenth studio album by American country music band Alabama, released in 1999 by RCA Records. It produced the singles "(God Must Have Spent) A Little More Time on You", a collaboration with 'N Sync, "Small Stuff", "We Made Love" and "Twentieth Century", which respectively reached No. 3, No. 24, No. 63, and No. 51 on the Hot Country Songs charts. In addition, "(God Must Have Spent) A Little More Time on You" was the band's last Top 10 hit on the country charts.

"(God Must Have Spent) A Little More Time On You" was originally recorded by 'N Sync in 1998 on their first album *NSYNC.

The album peaked at No. 5 on Billboard Country Albums chart and No. 51 on the Billboard 200.

== Critical reception ==
Professional ratings
Review scores
Source	Rating
AllMusic	2/5 stars

Stephen Thomas Erlewine of AllMusic wrote "There's not a note out of place or a missed harmony. It's easy to marvel at the sheer technical achievement of the record, since not only is it so well made, but the songs rarely make an impression…That's the problem with Twentieth Century: although it's pleasant, it never creates its own identity, even compared to latter-day Alabama records." He praised "Twentieth Century", "Mist of Desire", "Life's Too Short to Love This Fast", and "God Must Have Spent a Little More Time on You" as the best tracks, but said that "taken in the context of the record, they're nearly indistinguishable from the rest".

== Track listing ==
No.	Title	Writer(s)	Length
1.	"Twentieth Century"	Chris A.T. Cummings, Don Schlitz	4:11
2.	"(God Must Have Spent) A Little More Time on You" (featuring 'N Sync)	Evan Rogers, Carl Sturken	4:38
3.	"I'm In That Kind of Mood"	Greg Fowler, Teddy Gentry, Randy Owen, Ronnie Rogers	3:38
4.	"We Made Love"	Tom Douglas, Billy Kirsch	3:36
5.	"Life's Too Short To Love This Fast"	Gary Baker, Frank J. Myers, Owen	3:18
6.	"Then We Remember"	Don Cook, John Barlow Jarvis	4:12
7.	"Little Things"	Buddy Cannon, Fowler, Gentry, John Jarrard, Owen	3:22
8.	"Mist of Desire"	Jeff Cook	3:06
9.	"Small Stuff"	Mark Collie, Hillary Kanter, Even Stevens	3:59
10.	"Too Much Love"	Fowler, Owen	3:55
11.	"Write It Down In Blue"	Fowler, Gentry, Owen, R. Rogers	4:15
12.	"I Love You Enough To Let You Go"	Baker, Myers, Owen	3:26

== Personnel ==
Compiled from liner notes.

Alabama

- Randy Owen – vocals, acoustic guitars
- Jeff Cook – vocals, electric guitars, lead vocals (8)
- Teddy Gentry – vocals, bass guitar, lead vocals (6)

Mark Herndon is not credited on the album.

Additional musicians

- John Barlow Jarvis – acoustic piano, keyboards, Hammond B3 organ
- Brian D. Siewert – synth strings
- Mark Casstevens – acoustic guitars
- Brent Rowan – electric guitars, 12-string electric guitar, gut-string guitar, electric sitar
- Michael Rhodes – bass guitar
- Glenn Worf – bass guitar
- Lonnie Wilson – drums, percussion
- Jim Nelson – saxophones
- Dean C. Pastin – saxophones
- Larry Hanson – trumpet
- Don Cook – backing vocals
- Liana Manis – backing vocals
- NSYNC – vocals (2)

Production

- Alabama – producers
- Don Cook – producer
- Mike Bradley – recording, mixing
- Mark Capps – recording, editing
- Dave Boyer – editing
- John Kunz – editing
- Hank Williams – mastering at MasterMix (Nashville, Tennessee)
- Bill Brunt – art direction, design
- Susan Eaddy – art direction
- Blake Morgan – design
- Peter Nash – photography

== Chart performance ==
=== Weekly charts ===
Chart (1999)	Peak position
Canadian Country Albums (RPM)	5
US Billboard 200	51
US Top Country Albums (Billboard)	5

=== Year-end charts ===
Chart (1999)	Position
US Top Country Albums (Billboard)	55

== Certifications ==
Region	Certification	Certified units/sales
United States (RIAA)	Gold	500,000^{^}
^{^} Shipments figures based on certification alone.
