= Christmas Vol. II =

1996 album by Alabama

Studio album by Alabama
- Released: September 17, 1996
- Studio: The Tracking Room, Emerald Sound, Garden Recording Studios, The Music Mill and Masterfonics (Nashville, Tennessee); Cook Sound Studio (Fort Payne, Alabama).
- Genre: Country
- Length: 44:32
- Label: RCA Nashville
- Producer: Alabama and Emory Gordy Jr.

Alabama chronology
In Pictures (1995)	Christmas Vol. II (1996)	Dancin' on the Boulevard (1997)

Professional ratings
Review scores
Source	Rating
Allmusic	2.5/5 stars

Christmas Vol. II is the second Christmas album of American country music band Alabama. It was released on September 17, 1996.

== Track listing ==
1. "The Blessings" (Teddy Gentry, Randy Owen, Ronnie Rogers, Greg Fowler) - 4:35
2. "Christmas in Your Arms" (Bill Anderson, Steve Wariner) - 3:23
3. "Christmas Is Love" (Rich Alves, T. J. Knight, Jerry Taylor) - 3:24
4. "When It Comes to Christmas" (Gentry, Owen, Rogers) - 2:51
5. "I Was Young Once Too" (Richard Leigh, Robert Byrne) - 3:32
6. "The Night Before Christmas" (Jim McBride, Sam Hogin, Nelson Larkin) - 4:13
7. "O Little Town of Bethlehem" (Lewis Redner) (Public Domain) - 3:11
8. "Happy Birthday Jesus" (J. P. Pennington, Gentry) - 3:08
9. "The Christmas Spirit" (Gentry, Owen, Rogers) - 4:12
10. "Hangin' 'Round the Mistletoe" (Kostas) - 2:19
11. "The Little Drummer Boy" (Katherine Kennicott Davis, Henry Onorati, Harry Simeone) - 4:40
12. "Rockin' Around the Christmas Tree" (Johnny Marks) - 2:21
13. "New Year's Eve 1999" (Gretchen Peters) - 2:45

== Personnel ==
Alabama

- Jeff Cook – guitars, fiddle, backing vocals
- Randy Owen – guitars, lead vocals
- Teddy Gentry – bass guitar, backing vocals
- Mark Herndon – drums

Additional musicians

- John Mattick – acoustic piano, organ, synthesizers
- Steve Nathan – keyboards
- Larry Hanson – keyboards, guitars
- Tim Briggs – guitars, mandolin, harmonica
- Dann Huff – electric guitars
- Biff Watson – acoustic guitars
- Emory Gordy Jr. – bass guitar, string arrangements
- Lonnie Wilson – drums
- Terry McMillan – percussion, harmonica
- Jim Nelson – saxophone
- Glen Duncan – fiddle
- Anthony LaMarchina – cello
- Bruce Christenson – viola
- Jim Grosjean – viola
- Kathryn Plummer – viola
- Kristin Wilkinson – viola
- David Davidson – violin
- Connie Heard – violin
- Pamela Sixfin – violin
- Christian Teal – violin
- Bob Moffatt – backing vocals (3)
- Clint Moffatt – backing vocals (3)
- Dave Moffatt – backing vocals (3)
- Scott Moffatt – backing vocals (3)
- The Jeffettes – backing vocals (6)

Production

- Alabama – producers
- Emory Gordy Jr. – producer
- Russ Martin – track recording, overdub recording (1–5, 7–13)
- Tim Dobson – overdub recording (6)
- Ed Turner – overdub recording (6)
- Chris Davie – track recording assistant
- Tim Waters – overdub recording assistant (1–5, 7–13)
- Stephen Tillisch – mixing
- Brian Hardin – mix assistant
- Glenn Meadows – mastering
- Susan Eaddy – art direction
- Gina Binkley and Altar Ego – design

== Chart performance ==
Album

Chart (1996)	Peak position
U.S. Billboard Top Country Albums	18
U.S. Billboard 200	177

Singles

Year	Single	Peak positions
Year	Single	US Country
1997	"The Blessings"	72
1999	"Rockin' Around the Christmas Tree"	64
2000	"New Year's Eve 1999"	55

== Certifications ==
Region	Certification	Certified units/sales
United States (RIAA)	Gold	500,000^{‡}
^{‡} Sales+streaming figures based on certification alone.
