= Christmas (Alabama album) =

1985 album by Alabama

Studio album by Alabama
- Released: September 1985
- Recorded: 1982 (Track 10), 1985 (Other Tracks)
- Genre: Country
- Length: 37:09
- Label: RCA Nashville
- Producer: Harold Shedd and Alabama

Alabama chronology
40-Hour Week (1985)	Christmas (1985)	Greatest Hits (1985)

Singles from Alabama Christmas
- 1. "Christmas in Dixie" Released: December 6, 1982

Professional ratings
Review scores
Source	Rating
Allmusic	4.5/5 stars

Christmas is the first Christmas album by country band Alabama. The album was released on RCA Nashville in 1985. It was certified double platinum for shipment of 2 million units by the Recording Industry Association of America on July 11, 1996. Since 1991 when SoundScan started to collate sales data, 515,300 copies have been sold in the United States.

The album is Alabama's first Christmas album and includes one of their more popular holiday songs, 1982's "Christmas in Dixie," which charted on two of Billboard magazine's music popularity charts in six different calendar years. "Christmas in Dixie" peaked at No. 35 on Billboard's Hot Country Singles chart in January 1983, and also reached No. 3 on Billboard's special, year-end, weekly Christmas Singles chart in December 1983.

== Track listing ==
1. "Santa Claus (I Still Believe In You)" (John Jarrard, Teddy Gentry, Randy Owen, Greg Fowler, Linda Gentry) – 4:07
2. "Joseph and Mary's Boy" (Don Cook, Keith Whitley) – 4:06
3. "Happy Holidays" (Ronnie Rogers, Swain Schaefer) – 3:18
4. "Christmas Memories" (Becky Hobbs, John Greenebaum, Randy Albright) – 3:21
5. "Tonight Is Christmas" (Keith Worsham, Stan Munsey Jr., Don Matthews, Steve Baccus) – 4:19
6. "Thistlehair The Christmas Bear" (Donny Lowery) – 4:06
7. "Tennessee Christmas" (Gary Chapman, Amy Grant) – 3:40
8. "A Candle In The Window" (Susan Longacre, Walt Aldridge, Gary Baker) – 3:51
9. "Homecoming Christmas" (Rogers) – 3:52
10. "Christmas in Dixie" (Mark Herndon, Randy Owen, Jeff Cook, Teddy Gentry) – 3:37

== Personnel ==
=== Alabama ===
- Randy Owen - lead vocals, electric guitar
- Jeff Cook - electric guitar, background vocals, lead vocals (9)
- Teddy Gentry - bass guitar, background vocals, lead vocals (5)

Mark Herndon, Alabama's drummer, does not play on this album.

=== Additional Musicians ===
- Eddie Bayers- drums
- Kenny Bell- acoustic guitar
- David Briggs- keyboards
- Shane Keister- synthesizer, Fairlight
- Farrell Morris- percussion
- Larry Paxton- bass guitar
- Brent Rowan- electric guitar

Strings performed by the "A" Strings, arranged by Bergen White.

== Chart performance ==
Chart (1985)	Peak position
U.S. Billboard Top Country Albums	8
U.S. Billboard 200	75

== Certifications ==
Region	Certification	Certified units/sales
United States (RIAA)	2× Platinum	2,000,000^{^}
^{^} Shipments figures based on certification alone.
