= The Touch (Alabama album) =

1986 album by Alabama

Studio album by Alabama
- Released: September 1986
- Studio: The Music Mill (Nashville, Tennessee)
- Genre: Country
- Length: 44:39
- Label: RCA Nashville
- Producer: Alabama; Harold Shedd

Alabama chronology
Greatest Hits (1986)	The Touch (1986)	Just Us (1987)

Singles from The Touch
- 1. "Touch Me When We're Dancing" Released: September 12, 1986; 2. ""You've Got" the Touch" Released: December 1986

Professional ratings
Review scores
Source	Rating
Allmusic	1/5 stars

The Touch is the tenth studio album from American country music band Alabama, released in 1986. It reached No.1 on the Billboard Country Albums chart and No. 69 on the Billboard 200.

== Track listing ==
No.	Title	Writer(s)	Length
1.	"You've Got the Touch"	Will Robinson, John Jarrard, Lisa Palas	4:15
2.	"Vacation"	Randy Owen	5:33
3.	"True, True Housewife"	Owen	3:53
4.	"Is This How Love Begins"	Bob Corbin	2:39
5.	"Cruisin'"	Vern Dant, Jeff Cook,Ted Hewitt	3:43
6.	"Touch Me When We're Dancing"	Terry Skinner, J. L. Wallace, Ken Bell	3:41
7.	"Let's Hear It For The Girl"	S. Alan Taylor	3:59
8.	"It's All Comin' Back To Me Now"	Dave Loggins	4:27
9.	"I Taught Her Everything She Knows"	Teddy Gentry, Greg Fowler, Jarrard, Walt Aldridge	4:36
10.	"Pony Express"	Gentry, Ken Lambert, Buddy Cannon, Dean Dillon	7:53
Total length:			44:39

== Personnel ==
=== Alabama ===
- Randy Owen – lead vocals, electric guitar
- Jeff Cook – electric guitar, backing vocals, lead vocals (5)
- Teddy Gentry – bass guitar, backing vocals, lead vocals (10)
- Mark Herndon – drums

=== Other musicians ===
- David Briggs – keyboards, string arrangements
- Costo Davis – synthesizers
- Mark Casstevens – acoustic guitar
- Steve Gibson – electric guitar, acoustic guitar
- Brent Rowan – electric guitar
- John Willis – electric guitar
- Mike Brignardello – bass guitar
- Larry Paxton – bass guitar
- Roger Cox – drums
- Roger Hawkins – drums
- Bob Mater – drums
- Milton Sledge – drums
- Charles Buckins – percussion
- Farrell Morris – percussion
- Quitman Dennis – saxophone
- Rob Hajacos – fiddle
- The "A" Strings – strings

== Production ==
- Alabama – producers
- Harold Shedd – producer
- Jim Cotton – engineer
- Joe Scaife – engineer
- George W. Clinton – assistant engineer
- Paul Goldberg – assistant engineer
- Benny Quinn – mastering at Masterfonics (Nashville, Tennessee)
- Bill Brunt at Private Eye Studio – art direction, design
- Greg Gorman – photography

== Chart performance ==
=== Album ===
Chart (1986)	Peak position
U.S. Billboard Top Country Albums	1
U.S. Billboard 200	69
Canadian RPM Top Albums	88

=== Singles ===
Year	Single	Peak positions	
Year	Single	US Country	CAN Country
1986	"Touch Me When We're Dancing"	1	1
1987	""You've Got" the Touch"	1	1

== Certifications ==
Region	Certification	Certified units/sales
Canada (Music Canada)	Gold	50,000^{^}
United States (RIAA)	Platinum	1,000,000^{^}
^{^} Shipments figures based on certification alone.
