= Songs of Inspiration II =

2007 album by Alabama

Studio album by Alabama
- Released: March 27, 2007
- Genre: Inspirational country
- Length: 43:05
- Label: RCA Nashville

Alabama chronology
Songs of Inspiration (2006)	Songs of Inspiration II (2007)	16 Biggest Hits (2007)

Professional ratings
Review scores
Source	Rating
Allmusic	3/5 stars

Songs of Inspiration II is the twenty-first studio album and the second gospel album by American country music group Alabama, released on March 27, 2007. It was their final studio album for the RCA Records label. The album peaked at No. 33 in Billboard 200 album charts., No. on the Christian Album chart and No. 3 on the Country Albums chart.

== Track listing ==
1. "I Am a Pilgrim" (Traditional; arr. Randy Owen) - 4:21
2. "Church in the Wildwood" (Traditional; arr. Owen) - 3:01
3. "Will the Circle Be Unbroken?" (Ada R. Habershon, Charles H. Gabriel) - 4:45
4. "If I Could Hear My Mother Pray Again" (John Whitfield Vaughan, James Rowe; arr. Randy Owen) - 3:20
5. "Suppertime" (Ira Stanphill) - 2:50
6. "Down by the Riverside" (Traditional; arr. Owen) - 2:49
7. "Precious Memories" (J.B.F. Wright, Lonnie B. Combs; arr. Owen) - 3:50
8. "Lonesome Valley" (Traditional; arr. Owen) - 2:49
9. "The Refrain of John Dillon James" (Ronnie Rogers) - 3:41
10. "Love Lifted Me" (Rowe, Howard E. Smith; arr. Owen) - 3:17
11. "When It Comes My Time" (Teddy Gentry) - 3:24
12. "One Life" (Buck Moore, Eric Todd) - 2:55
13. "The Star-Spangled Banner" (Francis Scott Key, John Stafford Smith; arr. Owen) - 2:03

== Personnel ==
Alabama

- Jeff Cook – electric guitar, vocals
- Teddy Gentry – bass guitar, vocals
- Randy Owen – acoustic guitar, electric guitar, vocals

Additional Musicians

- David Angell – violin
- Monisa Angell – viola
- Eddie Bayers – drums, percussion
- Jason Carter – fiddle
- Kristen Cassell – cello
- Mark Casstevens – banjo, dobro, acoustic guitar, harmonica
- John Catchings – cello
- Bruce Christensen – viola
- Michael Curtis – background vocals
- Dan Dugmore – steel guitar
- Connie Ellisor – violin
- Carl Gorodetzky – string contractor, violin
- Jim Grosjean – viola
- Aubrey Haynie – fiddle, mandolin
- Jim Horn – saxophone
- Randy Kohrs – dobro, acoustic guitar
- Anthony LaMarchina – cello
- Del McCoury – acoustic guitar, background vocals
- Rob McCoury – banjo
- Ronnie McCoury – banjo, background vocals
- Joey Miskulin – accordion
- Craig Nelson – bass guitar
- Gary Van Osdale – viola
- Mary Kathryn Van Osdale – violin
- Larry Paxton – arch guitar, acoustic bass guitar, bass guitar, electric guitar, nylon string guitar, string arrangements
- Gary Prim – Hammond B-3 organ, piano, synthesizer
- Carole Rabinowitz-Neuen – cello
- Pamela Sixfin – violin
- Alan Umstead – violin
- Catherine Umstead – violin
- Kristin Wilkinson – string arrangements

== Chart performance ==
Songs of Inspiration II peaked at #33 on Billboard 200, #3 on Billboard Country Albums, and #1 on Billboard Christian Albums.

Chart (2007)	Peak position
U.S. Billboard Top Christian Albums	1
U.S. Billboard Top Country Albums	3
U.S. Billboard 200	33

== Awards ==
In 2008, the album was nominated for a Dove Award for Country Album of the Year at the 39th GMA Dove Awards.
