= Small Stuff =

Single by Alabama

from the album Twentieth Century
- B-side: "God Must Have Spent a Little More Time on You"
- Released: October 16, 1999
- Genre: Country
- Length: 3:59
- Label: RCA Nashville
- Songwriters: Mark Collie, Hillary Kanter, Even Stevens
- Producers: Don Cook, Alabama

Alabama singles chronology
"God Must Have Spent a Little More Time on You" (1999)	"Small Stuff" (1999)	"Twentieth Century" (2000)

"Small Stuff" is a song recorded by the American country music group Alabama. It was released in October 1999 as the second single from the album Twentieth Century. The song reached #24 on the Billboard Hot Country Singles & Tracks chart. The song was written by Mark Collie, Hillary Kanter, and Even Stevens.

== Content and reception ==
"Small Stuff" is a ballad about a couple who remains in love with each other despite inconveniences in life, based around the hook "we don't sweat the small stuff". An uncredited review in Billboard praised Randy Owen's "soothing lead vocal" and the "understated" production.

== Chart performance ==
Chart (1999–2000)	Peak position
Canada Country Singles (RPM)	25
US Bubbling Under Hot 100 (Billboard)	10
US Hot Country Songs (Billboard)	24
