= Greatest Hits (Alabama album) =

Greatest hits album by Alabama
- Released: January 1986
- Recorded: 1985 (two new studio & two live tracks); 1980–1982, 1984 (older tracks)
- Genre: Country
- Length: 48:21
- Label: RCA Nashville
- Producers: Harold Shedd and Alabama

Alabama chronology
Christmas (1985)	Greatest Hits (1986)	The Touch (1986)

Singles from Greatest Hits
- 1. "She and I" Released: December 30, 1985

Professional ratings
Review scores
Source	Rating
Allmusic	5/5 stars

Greatest Hits is the first compilation album by American country music band Alabama. The album was released by RCA Records in 1986, and has since been certified platinum for sales of 5 million units by the Recording Industry Association of America.

By the mid-1980s, Alabama had become the most dominant act in country music. During the first half of the decade, the Fort Payne, Alabama-based group had 18 No. 1 songs in as many single releases (discounting their 1982 Christmas single, "Christmas in Dixie"). They had released six multi-platinum albums and had won many awards from the Country Music Association and Academy of Country Music.

Alabama's first greatest hits album includes eight of their hit singles; seven of those reached No. 1 on the Billboard magazine Hot Country Singles chart between 1980 and 1985. The eighth song of that group was "My Home's in Alabama", widely considered by fans to be their signature tune (despite only reaching No. 17).

Extended live concert versions of "My Home's in Alabama" and "Tennessee River", recorded at June Jam in 1985, are presented on this album. The album-length versions of "Why, Lady, Why" and "Mountain Music" are also included, as opposed to their respective single/radio edits. The version of "She and I" included here (complete with false fade-out toward the end of the song) runs more than five minutes, nearly 1½ minutes longer than the single edit.

The album contains two new tracks. Of these, "She and I" was the only single release, and it became the band's 19th No. 1 song in April 1986. The other song, "The Fans", is Alabama's ode of thanks to their fans. It was played in the 1993 DieHard 500 during the pre-race ceremonies to dedicate the now-deceased Davey Allison. A rewritten version of the song, retitled "Richard Petty Fans", was included on their American Pride album in 1992 to salute the retiring Richard Petty.

== Track listing ==
No.	Title	Writer(s)	Length
1.	"She and I"	Dave Loggins	5:18
2.	"Mountain Music"	Randy Owen	4:12
3.	"Feels So Right"	Owen	3:37
4.	"Old Flame"	Donny Lowery, Mac McAnally	3:12
5.	"Tennessee River (live version)"	Owen	8:06
6.	"Love in the First Degree"	Tim DuBois, Jim Hurt	3:18
7.	"40 Hour Week (For a Livin')"	Loggins, Don Schlitz, Lisa Silver	3:21
8.	"Why Lady Why"	Teddy Gentry, Rick Scott	4:11
9.	"The Fans"	Greg Fowler, Gentry, Owen	4:54
10.	"My Home's in Alabama (live version)"	Gentry, Owen	8:27

== Chart performance ==
=== Weekly charts ===
Chart (1986)	Peak position
Canadian Albums (RPM)	64
US Billboard 200	24
US Top Country Albums (Billboard)	1

=== Year-end charts ===
Chart (1986)	Position
US Billboard 200	60
US Top Country Albums (Billboard)	3
Chart (1987)	Position
US Top Country Albums (Billboard)	17
Chart (1988)	Position
US Top Country Albums (Billboard)	22
Chart (1989)	Position
US Top Country Albums (Billboard)	29
Chart (1990)	Position
US Top Country Albums (Billboard)	42

=== Singles ===
Year	Single	Peak positions	
Year	Single	US Country	CAN Country
1986	"She and I"	1	1

== Certifications ==
Region	Certification	Certified units/sales
United States (RIAA)	5× Platinum	5,000,000^{^}
^{^} Shipments figures based on certification alone.
