= When It All Goes South (song) =

Single by Alabama

from the album When It All Goes South
- B-side: "Feels So Right"
- Released: October 30, 2000
- Genre: Country
- Length: 6:56
- Label: RCA Nashville
- Songwriters: John Barlow Jarvis, Rick Carnes, Janis Carnes
- Producers: Don Cook, Alabama

Alabama singles chronology
"We Made Love" (2000)	"When It All Goes South" (2000)	"Will You Marry Me" (2001)

"When It All Goes South" is a song written by John Barlow Jarvis, Rick Carnes and Janis Carnes, and recorded by American country music group Alabama. It was released in October 2000 as the first single and title track from the album When It All Goes South. The song reached number 15 on the Billboard Hot Country Singles & Tracks chart. It was their last Solo Top 40 Hit.

== Music video ==
The music video was directed by Brent Hedgecock. It features a businessman in Manhattan who grew up in the South but now lives in a condominium. The television switches from the news to show a music video of Alabama playing "Mountain Music". Throughout the video, the businessman tries to hide his southern roots as he goes about his duties at work.

== Chart performance ==
"When It All Goes South" debuted at number 46 on the U.S. Billboard Hot Country Singles & Tracks for the week of November 4, 2000.

Chart (2000–2001)	Peak position
US Hot Country Songs (Billboard)	15
US Bubbling Under Hot 100 (Billboard)	10

=== Year-end charts ===
Chart (2001)	Position
US Country Songs (Billboard)	57
