= Christmas in Dixie =

1982 single by Alabama

- Side A of the original 1982 single

Single by Alabama

from the album A Country Christmas
- B-side: "Christmas Is Just a Song For Us This Year" (by Louise Mandrell and R.C. Bannon); "Thistlehair the Christmas Bear" (re-release)
- Released: December 6, 1982
- Recorded: 1982
- Studio: The Music Mill; Nashville, Tennessee, U.S.
- Genre: Christmas; country
- Length: 3:37; 3:42 (with spoken outro)
- Label: RCA Nashville
- Songwriters: Jeff Cook; Mark Herndon; Teddy Gentry; Randy Owen
- Producers: Harold Shedd; Alabama

Alabama singles chronology
"Close Enough to Perfect" (1982)	"Christmas in Dixie" (1982)	"Dixieland Delight" (1983)

Audio
- "Christmas in Dixie" on YouTube

"Christmas in Dixie" is a song by American country band Alabama. It was released as a single in December 1982 from the RCA Nashville compilation album A Country Christmas. The Christmas song celebrates the holiday in the southern United States. This song was included on Alabama's first Christmas album released in 1985 (titled Alabama Christmas) and has since been included on many Christmas compilations in both the country and all-genre music fields. In 2017, Alabama updated the song by re-recording the unplugged version of it for their third Christmas album titled American Christmas which celebrated its 35th anniversary when they first released the song in 1982. It is the only song credited solely to the four band members, and the one of only two songs to feature a songwriting credit for drummer Mark Herndon.

== Background ==
This country song is a celebration of Christmas in southeastern American states. Each verse begins with two references to non-Southeastern areas (New York City; California; Chicago and Detroit which is referred as "Motown") followed by two references to Southeastern cities (Memphis, Tennessee; Atlanta, Georgia; Jackson, Mississippi and Charlotte, North Carolina referred as "Caroline" in this song) and a final reference to Fort Payne, Alabama (the group's hometown).

The version released originally on A Country Christmas, as well as the version most often played on radio in the U.S., features a spoken-word Christmas greeting by each member of Alabama, after the line "And from Fort Payne, Alabama", and prior to the song's conclusion ("Merry Christmas tonight"). It was featured on the 2006 box set, Livin' Lovin' Rockin' Rollin': The 25th Anniversary Collection. The original single release was part of a double A-sided holiday release issued by RCA Nashville, paired with "Christmas Is Just a Song for Us This Year" by Louise Mandrell and R.C. Bannon. A 1997 rerelease had "Thistlehair the Christmas Bear" as its b-side.

== Lawsuit ==
In 2010, Allan Caswell initiated a lawsuit against ATV/Sony, who published both his song, "On The Inside" and the Alabama song "Christmas In Dixie", because he thought that it plagiarized the theme song he wrote for Prisoner, On the Inside. This action was based on ATV Sony commissioning a copyright expert to provide advice as to whether a plagiarism had taken place.

== Chart performance ==
The original version spent seven weeks on the charts between late 1982 and early 1983, peaking at number 35. It re-entered the chart three times between 1997 and 2000.

Chart (1982–1983)	Peak position
U.S. Billboard Hot Country Singles	35
U.S. Billboard Christmas Hit Singles	4
Chart (1997–1998)	Peak position
U.S. Billboard Hot Country Singles & Tracks	47
Chart (1998–1999)	Peak position
U.S. Billboard Hot Country Singles & Tracks	40
Chart (1999–2000)	Peak position
U.S. Billboard Hot Country Singles & Tracks	37

== Covers ==
The song was covered by Kenny Chesney on his 2003 album All I Want for Christmas Is a Real Good Tan and featured Alabama's lead singer Randy Owen joining him on the track. Country a cappella band Home Free covered it on their 2020 album Warmest Winter, with Owen singing lead and Alabama credited as a featured artist. Jason Aldean covered the song which was released in 2022.
