= Songs of Inspiration =

Studio album by Alabama
- Released: October 24, 2006
- Genre: Inspirational country
- Length: 49:30
- Label: RCA Nashville
- Producer: Randy Owen

Alabama chronology
Livin' Lovin' Rockin' Rollin': The 25th Anniversary Collection (2006)	Songs of Inspiration (2006)	Songs of Inspiration II (2007)

Professional ratings
Review scores
Source	Rating
AllMusic	3/5 stars

Songs of Inspiration is the twentieth studio album and the first gospel album by American country music group Alabama, released on October 24, 2006. The album debuted at No. 1 on both the Top Country Albums and Top Christian Albums charts, with 41,000 copies sold the first week. The album has sold 170,000 copies as of September 2015. It ranked at No. 15 on Billboard 200 album charts and No. 1 on Billboard Country Albums chart.

== Track listing ==
1. "His Eye Is on the Sparrow" (Civilla D. Martin, Charles H. Gabriel) - 4:10
2. "In the Garden" (C. Austin Miles) - 3:28
3. "Amazing Grace" (John Newton) - 3:35
4. "How Great Thou Art" (Stuart K. Hine) - 4:26
5. "I Need Thee" (Annie S. Hawks, Robert Lowry) - 2:09
6. "Old Shep" (Red Foley) - 3:06
7. "Jesus Loves Me" (William Batchelder Bradbury, David Rutherford McGuire, Anna Bartlett Warner) - 3:19
8. "Silent Night" (Franz Gruber, Josef Mohr) - 3:31
9. "I Am the Man Thomas" (Larry Sparks, Ralph Stanley) - 2:02
10. "Rock of Ages" (Augustus Montague Toplady, Thomas Hastings) - 2:36
11. "In the Sweet By and By" (Sanford F. Bennett, Joseph Philbrick Webster) - 3:28
12. "The Old Rugged Cross" (George Bennard) - 3:09
13. "What Will I Leave Behind" (Sherrill Brown) - 2:40
14. "One Big Heaven" (Randy Owen) - 4:16
15. "Rain" (Owen) - 3:35

== Personnel ==
Alabama

- Jeff Cook – electric guitar, vocals
- Randy Owen – acoustic guitar, electric guitar, vocals
- Teddy Gentry – bass guitar, vocals

Additional Musicians

- Gary Prim – acoustic piano, synthesizers, Hammond B3 organ
- Joey Miskulin – accordion
- Mark Casstevens – acoustic guitar, banjo, dobro, harmonica
- Randy Kohrs – acoustic guitar, dobro
- James Alan Shelton – acoustic guitar
- Larry Paxton – electric guitar, nylon string guitar, acoustic bass, bass guitar, string arrangements
- Steve Sparkman – banjo
- Nathan Stanley – mandolin
- Eddie Bayers – drums, percussion
- Dewey Brown III – fiddle
- Aubrey Haynie – fiddle, mandolin
- Kristin Wilkinson – string arrangements
- Carl Gorodetzky – string contractor
- Kirsten Cassi – cello
- Anthony LaMarchina – cello
- Bruce Christensen – viola
- Christopher Farrell – viola
- Gary Vanosdale – viola
- David Davidson – violin
- Conni Ellisor – violin
- Carolyn Huebel – violin
- Pamela Sixfin – violin
- Alan Umstead – violin
- Mary Kathryn Vanosdale – violin
- Bailey Barnes – backing vocals
- Karstin Brewis – backing vocals
- Kensley Brewis – backing vocals
- David Burt – backing vocals
- Sawyer Burt – backing vocals
- Michael Curtis – backing vocals
- Melinda Doolittle – backing vocals
- Kim Fleming – backing vocals
- Ella Fowler – backing vocals
- Abby Fraebel – backing vocals
- Griffin Horton – backing vocals
- Kaden Horton – backing vocals
- Rebecca Isaacs Bowman –backing vocals (5)
- Ben Isaacs – backing vocals (5)
- Nathan Isaacs – backing vocals (5)
- Alexis Lutz – backing vocals
- Emma Lutz – backing vocals
- Jesse Lutz – backing vocals
- Belinda Wallace – backing vocals
- Nathan Young – backing vocals
- Ralph Stanley – vocals (9)

== Chart performance ==
Chart (2006)	Peak position
U.S. Billboard 200	15
U.S. Billboard Top Christian Albums	1
U.S. Billboard Top Country Albums	1

== Awards ==
In 2007, the album was nominated for a Dove Award for Country Album of the Year at the 38th GMA Dove Awards.
