= "You've Got" the Touch =

1986 song by Alabama

"You've Got the Touch"

Single by Alabama

from the album The Touch
- B-side: "True, True Housewife"
- Released: December 1986 (U.S.)
- Recorded: 1986
- Length: 4:15
- Label: RCA Nashville
- Songwriters: John Jarrard, Lisa Palas, Will Robinson
- Producers: Harold Shedd and Alabama

Alabama singles chronology
"Deep River Woman" (1986)	"You've Got the Touch" (1986)	"Tar Top" (1987)

"'You've Got' the Touch" is a song written by Lisa Palas, John Jarrard and Will Robinson, and recorded by American country music band Alabama. The song, a ballad done in the band's signature mellow style, was released in December 1986, as the second and final single from the album The Touch. "'You've Got' the Touch" was a number-one hit on the Billboard Hot Country Singles chart in April 1987.

The song was Alabama's 21st — and as it turned out, final consecutive — chart-topper in a string that dated from August 1980's "Tennessee River". The follow-up single, the semi-autobiographical "Tar Top", peaked at number seven that November, breaking the streak. A new streak would be started in early 1988 with the song "Face to Face".

The words "You've Got" in the song title were surrounded by quotation marks, rather than parentheses, due to a clerical error which went uncorrected.

This song is unrelated to Stan Bush's song of a similar title from 1986's The Transformers: The Movie.

== Charts ==
Chart (1986–1987)	Peak position
US Hot Country Songs (Billboard)	1
Canadian RPM Country Tracks	1
