= She and I =

Single by Alabama

from the album Greatest Hits
- B-side: "The Fans"
- Released: January 1986 (U.S.)
- Recorded: December 1985
- Genre: Country
- Length: 3:36 (single edit); 5:18 (album version)
- Label: RCA Nashville
- Songwriter: Dave Loggins
- Producers: Harold Shedd and Alabama

Alabama singles chronology
"Can't Keep a Good Man Down" (1985)	"She and I" (1986)	"Touch Me When We're Dancing" (1986)

Music video
- "She and I" at CMT.com

"She and I" is a song written by Dave Loggins, and recorded by American country music band Alabama. It was released in January 1986, as the only single from their first Greatest Hits compilation album.

The song was their 19th consecutive No. 1 song on the Billboard magazine Hot Country Singles chart in April 1986.

== Content ==
The song is an uptempo, rock-tinged song professing marital lust.

== Critical reception ==
Country music writer Tom Roland noted that the song "featured a barrage of unique sounds," including a "strange drum effect" (the echo for each snare drum beat would end with a pop, instead of "decaying"). Also, the album version of the song featured a false ending (much like Elvis Presley's "Suspicious Minds"), whereby the song fades out before returning to full volume and then fading back out.

== Music video ==
The music video was directed by David Hogan and premiered in early 1986.

== Single and album edits ==
The version of "She and I" was released for radio airplay, the music video, and retail sale as a 7-inch single is nearly two minutes shorter than the full-length album version. Among other noticeable differences, the single version's end is abridged and does not include the false fade.

== Chart positions ==
Chart (1986)	Peak position
US Hot Country Songs (Billboard)	1
Canadian RPM Country Tracks	1
