= Jeff Cook =

American country musician (1949–2022)

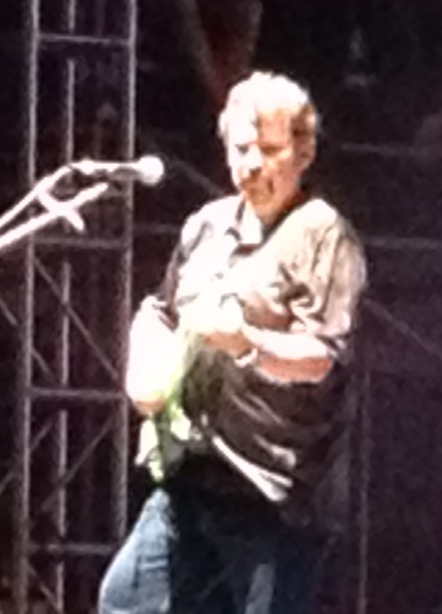
- Cook performing with Alabama in 2014

Background information
- Born: Jeffrey Alan Cook; August 27, 1949; Fort Payne, Alabama, U.S.
- Died: November 7, 2022 (aged 73) Destin, Florida, U.S.
- Genres: Country, country rock
- Occupations: Musician, songwriter
- Instruments: Vocals, guitar, fiddle, piano
- Years active: 1972–2022
- Formerly of: Alabama

Jeffrey Alan Cook (August 27, 1949 – November 7, 2022) was an American country musician. Cook was best known for being a founding member of the band Alabama, in which he contributed to occasional lead vocals, guitar, fiddle, piano and other musical instruments.

== Life and career ==
Jeffrey Alan Cook was born in Fort Payne, Alabama. He was a graduate of Fort Payne High School and Jacksonville State University. He obtained a broadcast engineer license three days after his fourteenth birthday, and worked at a local radio station as a disc jockey while still in high school.

Cook co-founded the band Wildcountry, along with his cousins Randy Owen and Teddy Gentry, in 1972 (the name was changed to Alabama in 1977). He contributed lead as well as backing vocals, lead guitar, keyboard, and fiddle to the group's productions. Since the band ceased active production and performance in 2004, Cook has formed the groups Cook & Glenn and the Allstar Goodtime Band, with which he performed.

In addition to his performance work, Cook founded Cook Sound Studios, Inc., in his native Fort Payne, and also established radio station WQRX-AM, which he later sold, in adjacent Valley Head, Alabama. Cook is also noted for his culinary endeavors, having operated a restaurant and marketed his own sauce.

Cook was inducted into the Musicians Hall of Fame and Museum in 2019.

== Personal life and death ==
On April 11, 2017, Cook disclosed that he was diagnosed with Parkinson's disease four years earlier. He stopped touring regularly with Alabama in 2018, eventually reuniting to join the band for their 50th Anniversary tour in 2022. Cook died of complications from Parkinson's disease in Destin, Florida, on November 7, 2022, at the age of 73.

== Solo discography ==
- 2005: On Fire
- 2008: Just Pickin'
- 2009: Ashes Won't Burn
- 2009: Jeff Cook Presents Christmas Joy
- 2009: "Tribute to a Soldier" (single with Charlie Daniels and Ken Randolph)
- 2010: Shaken... Not Stirred
- 2011: 2 Rock 4 Country
- 2011: Bits & Pieces / Odds & Ends
- 2012: Shaken Not Stirred
- 2018: Why Not Me with William Shatner
