= Ronnie Rogers =

American singer-songwriter

- Born: Randall Rogers
- Origin: Nashville, Tennessee, U.S.
- Genres: Country
- Occupation: Singer-songwriter
- Instrument: Vocals
- Years active: 1981–present
- Labels: Lifesong, Epic, MTM

Randall "Ronnie" Rogers (born in Nashville, Tennessee) is an American country music singer and songwriter. In the late 1970s and early 1980s, Rogers charted eight singles on the Billboard country charts, including the top 40 hits "Gonna Take My Angel Out Tonight" and "My Love Belongs to You". He recorded for the Lifesong, Epic and MTM labels.

Rogers has also co-written several singles for the band Alabama, including the number one hits "Dixieland Delight" and "Jukebox in My Mind."

== Singles ==
Year	Single	Chart Positions
Year	Single	US Country
1981	"Gonna Take My Angel Out Tonight"	39
1982	"My Love Belongs to You"	37
1982	"First Time Around"	54
1982	"Happy Country Birthday"	86
1982	"Takin' It Back to the Hills"	86
1983	"Inside Story"	66
1987	"Good Timin' Shoes"	57
1988	"Let's Be Bad Tonight"	82
