= Randy Owen =

American country singer (born 1949)

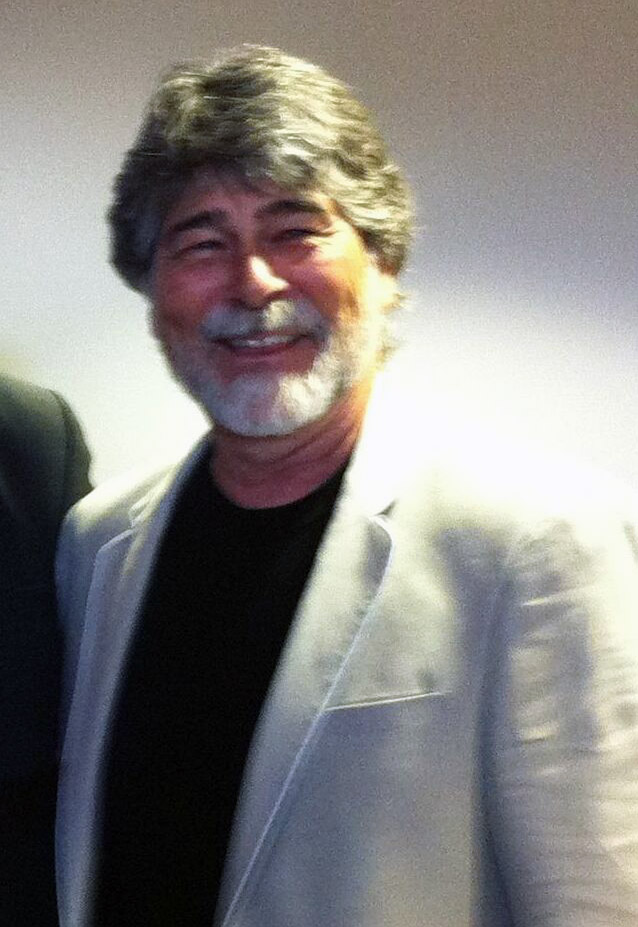
- Owen in 2013

Background information
- Born: Randy Yeuell Owen; December 13, 1949 (age 76); Fort Payne, Alabama, U.S.
- Genres: Country, southern rock, bluegrass
- Occupations: Singer, songwriter
- Instruments: Vocals, guitar
- Years active: 1969–present
- Labels: RCA Nashville (in Alabama); DMP/New Revolution (solo); Broken Bow (solo)
- Member of: Alabama
- Website: randyowen.com

Randy Yeuell Owen (born December 13, 1949) is an American country musician. He is best known for his role as the lead singer of Alabama, a country music band that saw commercial success throughout the 1980s and 1990s. Alabama became the most successful band in country music, releasing more than 20 gold and platinum records, dozens of No. 1 singles, and selling more than 75 million records during their career. Owen also maintains a career as a solo performer. He released his solo debut One on One in late 2008 and charted two singles from it.

Owen was inducted into the Country Music Hall of Fame in 2005 and the Musicians Hall of Fame and Museum in 2019, both as a member of Alabama.

== Biography ==
Randy Yeuell Owen grew up on a farm near Fort Payne, Alabama. He is of English and Scottish ancestry. He dropped out of high school in the ninth grade, but he returned and graduated from Fort Payne High in 1969. In the late 1960s, Owen and his cousin, Teddy Gentry, began playing music together. They recruited another cousin, Jeff Cook, to form a band, which they called Wildcountry. Their first public performance was at a high school talent show, which they won.

Owen's music career was put on hiatus as he earned an English degree from Jacksonville State University. He was also a member of Pi Kappa Phi, Delta Epsilon chapter. Upon his graduation, however, the three cousins moved into an apartment in Anniston, Alabama, and by 1973 were pursuing a full-time music career. In 1980, the band, now called Alabama, were signed to a recording contract by RCA Records and quickly reached country superstardom. For the next twenty-two years, Alabama had a tremendous impact on country music, attracting a younger group of listeners, crossing over into pop radio, and paving the way for groups to be successful on country radio.

Alabama released 21 gold, platinum, and multi-platinum albums, 42 singles that topped the charts at No. 1, and sold more than 75 million records in total. They have a star on the Hollywood Walk of Fame and were named the Academy of Country Music's Artist of the Decade in 1989, and the Recording Industry Association of America's Country Group of the Century in 1999.

In May 2002, the band announced their retirement during the Academy of Country Music Awards telecast. For the rest of 2002 and 2003, they performed throughout the country in their American Farewell Tour. In 2005, the band was inducted into the Country Music Hall of Fame.

Owen lives on his cattle ranch outside Fort Payne. He currently serves as an at-large member of the Board of Trustees of Jacksonville State University. In 2007, he was a judge on Season 5 of the country talent show Nashville Star.

Owen took over hosting duties for Country Gold, the Saturday night classic country request program on Westwood One, beginning July 21, 2012. The show was reformatted upon Owen's arrival, switching to a pre-recorded format (the show's predecessor, Country Gold Saturday Night, was originally live.) Requests were handled by an answering machine and the program was voicetracked from Owen's home, drifting to a more open-ended "traditional country" format (one that includes more 1990s songs and even some 2000s songs along with country-pop tunes more commonly associated with the classic hits format while moving away from the core songs of the classic country format) and shortening the show from five hours to four. Less than a year after Owen's arrival, previous Country Gold host Rowdy Yates relaunched his version of the show as "The Original Country Gold" through Compass Media Networks. Owen ended his run as host on April 2, 2016, with Canadian-born singer Terri Clark, replacing him the following weekend. Clark hosted the show until the weekend of September 7, 2024.

== Discography ==
=== Studio albums ===
Title	Album details	Peak chart positions		
Title	Album details	US Country	US	US Indie
One on One	Release date: November 4, 2008; Label: Broken Bow Records	14	77	5

=== Singles ===
Year	Single	Peak positions	Album
Year	Single	US Country	Album
2008	"Braid My Hair"	45	One on One
2008	"Like I Never Broke Her Heart"	41	One on One
2009	"Holding Everything" (with Megan Mullins)	—	One on One
"—" denotes releases that did not chart

== Publications ==
- Born Country: My Life in Alabama – How Faith, Family, and Music Brought Me Home. HarperOne (2008)
