= Charly McClain discography =

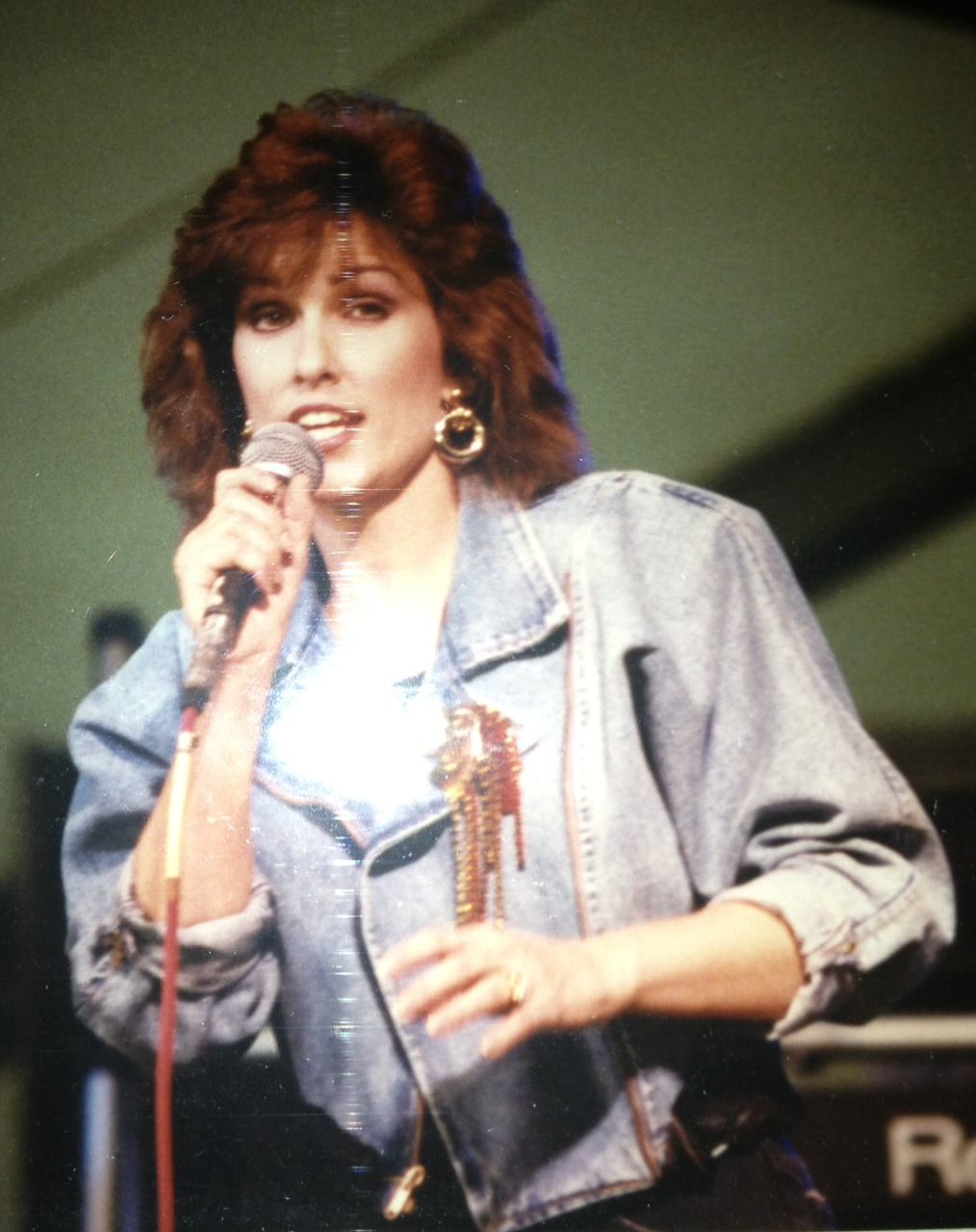
- McClain performing in 1989
- Studio albums: 15
- Compilation albums: 7
- Singles: 39
- Music videos: 1

The discography of American country music singer Charly McClain consists of 15 studio albums, seven compilation albums, 39 singles, and one music video. Between 1976 and 1989, McClain charted 39 singles on the Billboard Hot Country Singles chart, including three Number One singles: "Who's Cheatin' Who" (1981), "Paradise Tonight" (1983), and "Radio Heart" (1985).

== Studio albums ==
Title	Album details	Peak positions	
Title	Album details	US Country	CAN Country
Here's Charly McClain	Release date: February 1977; Label: Epic Records; Formats: LP, cassette	—	—
Let Me Be Your Baby	Release date: October 1978; Label: Epic Records; Formats: LP, cassette	47	—
Alone Too Long	Release date: July 1979; Label: Epic Records; Formats: LP, cassette	—	—
Women Get Lonely	Release date: April 1980; Label: Epic Records; Formats: LP, cassette	73	—
Who's Cheatin' Who	Release date: November 1980; Label: Epic Records; Formats: LP, cassette	28	—
Surround Me with Love	Release date: May 1981; Label: Epic Records; Formats: LP, cassette	9	—
Too Good to Hurry	Release date: July 1982; Label: Epic Records; Formats: LP, cassette	22	—
Paradise	Release date: April 1983; Label: Epic Records; Formats: LP, cassette	21	—
The Woman in Me	Release date: December 1983; Label: Epic Records; Formats: LP, cassette	6	—
It Takes Believers (with Mickey Gilley)	Release date: April 1984; Label: Epic Records; Formats: LP, cassette	7	10
Charly	Release date: May 1984; Label: Epic Records; Formats: LP, cassette	20	—
Radio Heart	Release date: April 1985; Label: Epic Records; Formats: LP, cassette	15	—
When Love Is Right (with Wayne Massey)	Release date: February 1986; Label: Epic Records; Formats: LP, cassette	29	—
Still I Stay	Release date: March 1987; Label: Epic Records; Formats: LP, cassette, CD	35	—
Charly McClain	Release date: September 1988; Label: Mercury Records; Formats: LP, cassette, CD	—	—
"—" denotes releases that did not chart

== Compilation albums ==
Title	Album details	Peak positions
Title	Album details	US Country
Encore	Release date: July 1981; Label: Epic Records; Formats: LP, cassette	52
Greatest Hits	Release date: October 1982; Label: Epic Records; Formats: LP, cassette	43
Biggest Hits	Release date: November 1985; Label: Epic Records; Formats: LP, cassette, CD	—
Ten Year Anniversary	Release date: November 1987; Label: Epic Records; Formats: LP, cassette, CD	—
Portfolio	Release date: 1991; Label: Sony Music Distribution; Formats: CD, cassette	—
Pure Country	Release date: 1998; Label: Sony Special Products; Formats: CD, cassette	—
Anthology	Release date: March 16, 1999; Label: Renaissance Records; Formats: CD	—
"—" denotes releases that did not chart

== Singles ==
Year	Single	Peak positions		Album
Year	Single	US Country	CAN Country	Album
1976	"Lay Down"	67	—	Here's Charly McClain
1977	"Lay Something on My Bed Besides a Blanket"	82	—	Here's Charly McClain
1977	"It's Too Late to Love Me Now"	87	—	Here's Charly McClain
1977	"Make the World Go Away"	73	—	Let Me Be Your Baby
1978	"Let Me Be Your Baby"	13	19	Let Me Be Your Baby
1978	"That's What You Do to Me"	8	1	Let Me Be Your Baby
1979	"Take Me Back"	24	28	Let Me Be Your Baby
1979	"When A Love Ain't Right"	11	31	Alone Too Long
1979	"You're a Part of Me"	20	66	Alone Too Long
1979	"I Hate the Way I Love It" (with Johnny Rodriguez)	16	65	Women Get Lonely
1980	"Men"	7	12	Women Get Lonely
1980	"Let's Put Our Love in Motion"	23	42	Women Get Lonely
1980	"Women Get Lonely"	18	23	Women Get Lonely
1980	"Who's Cheatin' Who"	1	2	Who's Cheatin' Who
1981	"Surround Me with Love"	5	13	Surround Me with Love
1981	"Sleepin' with the Radio On"	4	2	Surround Me with Love
1981	"The Very Best Is You"	5	20	Surround Me with Love
1982	"Dancing Your Memory Away"	3	6	Too Good to Hurry
1982	"With You"	7	6	Too Good to Hurry
1983	"Fly into Love"	20	20	Paradise
1983	"Paradise Tonight" (with Mickey Gilley)	1	1	Paradise
1983	"Sentimental Ol' You"	3	3	The Woman in Me
1984	"Candy Man" (with Mickey Gilley)	5	3	It Takes Believers
1984	"Band of Gold"	22	25	The Woman in Me
1984	"The Right Stuff" (with Mickey Gilley)	14	7	It Takes Believers
1984	"Some Hearts Get All the Breaks"	25	21	Charly
1985	"Radio Heart"	1	1	Radio Heart
1985	"With Just One Look in Your Eyes" (with Wayne Massey)	5	9	Radio Heart
1985	"You Are My Music, You Are My Song" (with Wayne Massey)	10	8	Radio Heart
1986	"When It's Down to Me and You" (with Wayne Massey)	17	27	When Love Is Right
1986	"So This Is Love"	41	30	Radio Heart
1986	"When Love Is Right" (with Wayne Massey)	74	45	When Love Is Right
1987	"Don't Touch Me There"	20	19	Still I Stay
1987	"And Then Some"	51	40	Still I Stay
1988	"Still I Stay"	60	—	Still I Stay
1988	"Sometimes She Feels Like a Man"	55	75	Charly McClain
1988	"Down the Road"	58	—	Charly McClain
1989	"One on Your Heart, One on Your Mind"	50	—	Charly McClain
1989	"You Got the Job"	65	—	Charly McClain
"—" denotes releases that did not chart

== Music videos ==
Year	Title
1983	"Fly Into Love"
