= 1983 in country music =

This is a list of notable events in country music that took place in the year 1983.

== Events ==
- March — In a span of two days, two major cable networks signed on the air. Country Music Television (CMT) went on-the-air March 5, while The Nashville Network (TNN) came on two days later on March 7. CMT (originally called "CMTV") was chiefly video-oriented, while TNN offered more feature-oriented programming.

== Top hits of the year ==
=== Singles released by American artists ===
US	CAN	Single	Artist
19	23	After the Great Depression	Razzy Bailey
10	—	After the Last Goodbye	Gus Hardin
7	27	Ain't No Trick (It Takes Magic)	Lee Greenwood
13	3	All My Life	Kenny Rogers
20	16	Almost Called Her Baby by Mistake	Larry Gatlin & the Gatlin Brothers
4	1	Amarillo by Morning	George Strait
1	12	American Made	The Oak Ridge Boys
17	17	Anybody Else's Heart but Mine	Terri Gibbs
9	—	Atlanta Burned Again Last Night	Atlanta
4	—	Baby I Lied	Deborah Allen
1	1	Baby, What About You	Crystal Gayle
2	1	The Bird	Jerry Reed
1	1	Black Sheep	John Anderson
20	25	Born to Love Me	Ray Charles
18	7	The Boy Gets Around	Sylvia
10	4	Breakin' Down	Waylon Jennings
10	18	C.C. Waterback	Merle Haggard/George Jones
1	—	Can't Even Get the Blues	Reba McEntire
17	—	A Child of the Fifties	The Statler Brothers
1	1	The Closer You Get	Alabama
1	1	Common Man	John Conlee
15	12	The Conversation	Waylon Jennings with Hank Williams, Jr.
9	39	Dance Little Jean	Nitty Gritty Dirt Band
11	—	Dixie Dreaming	Atlanta
1	1	Dixieland Delight	Alabama
9	22	Don't Count the Rainy Days	Michael Martin Murphey
1	1	Don't You Know How Much I Love You	Ronnie Milsap
13	11	Down on the Corner	Jerry Reed
9	10	Dream Baby (How Long Must I Dream)	Lacy J. Dalton
18	—	Everybody's Dream Girl	Dan Seals
7	5	Everything's Beautiful in Its Own Way	Dolly Parton and Willie Nelson
19	—	Eyes of a Stranger	David Wills
1	1	Faking Love	T. G. Sheppard and Karen Brooks
10	—	Feel Right	Tanya Tucker
1	2	A Fire I Can't Put Out	George Strait
4	8	Flight 309 to Tennessee	Shelly West
20	20	Fly Into Love	Charly McClain
1	1	Fool for Your Love	Mickey Gilley
4	8	Foolin'	Johnny Rodriguez
5	7	Goin' Down Hill	John Anderson
1	1	Going Where the Lonely Go	Merle Haggard
4	4	Gonna Go Huntin' Tonight	Hank Williams, Jr.
19	39	A Good Night's Love	Tammy Wynette
16	31	Good Ole Boys	Jerry Reed
9	16	Guilty	The Statler Brothers
9	5	Hangin' Around	The Whites
1	1	He's a Heartache (Looking for a Place to Happen)	Janie Fricke
6	3	Heartache Tonight	Conway Twitty
2	1	Hey Bartender	Johnny Lee
1	1	Highway 40 Blues	Ricky Skaggs
20	7	Hold On, I'm Comin'	Waylon Jennings & Jerry Reed
1	2	Holding Her and Loving You	Earl Thomas Conley
10	2	Honkytonk Man	Marty Robbins
1	1	Houston (Means I'm One Day Closer to You)	Larry Gatlin & the Gatlin Brothers
6	16	How Could I Love Her So Much	Johnny Rodriguez
6	4	I.O.U.	Lee Greenwood
1	6	I Always Get Lucky with You	George Jones
10	3	I Don't Remember Loving You	John Conlee
2	3	I Have Loved You Girl (But Not Like This Before)	Earl Thomas Conley
4	3	I Love Her Mind	The Bellamy Brothers
17	—	I Love How You Love Me	Glen Campbell
19	—	I Still Love You in the Same Ol' Way	Moe Bandy
20	—	I Wish I Was in Nashville	Mel McDaniel
8	14	I Wonder	Rosanne Cash
10	10	I Wonder Where We'd Be Tonight	Vern Gosdin
9	14	I Wonder Who's Holding My Baby Tonight	The Whites
1	1	I Wouldn't Change You If I Could	Ricky Skaggs
5	1	I'm Movin' On	Emmylou Harris
1	2	I'm Only in It for the Love	John Conlee
1	1	If Hollywood Don't Need You (Honey I Still Do)	Don Williams
19	—	If It Was Easy	Ed Bruce
5	39	If You're Gonna Do Me Wrong (Do It Right)	Vern Gosdin
10	10	In the Middle of the Night	Mel Tillis
4	6	In Times Like These	Barbara Mandrell
1	1	Inside	Ronnie Milsap
1	1	Islands in the Stream	Kenny Rogers with Dolly Parton
14	—	It Hasn't Happened Yet	Rosanne Cash
29	19	The Jogger	Bobby Bare
1	1	Jose Cuervo	Shelly West
1	1	Lady Down on Love	Alabama
2	1	Last Thing I Needed First Thing This Morning	Willie Nelson
6	7	Leave Them Boys Alone	Hank Williams, Jr.
10	27	Let's Get Over Them Together	Moe Bandy (featuring Becky Hobbs)
2	1	Like Nothing Ever Happened	Sylvia
10	20	Little Old Fashioned Karma	Willie Nelson
15	13	Lonely But Only for You	Sissy Spacek
1	3	(Lost His Love) On Our Last Date	Emmylou Harris
2	1	Lost in the Feeling	Conway Twitty
5	5	Lost My Baby Blues	David Frizzell
11	18	Love Affairs	Michael Martin Murphey
1	1	Love is On a Roll	Don Williams
5	27	The Love She Found in Me	Gary Morris
1	1	Love Song	The Oak Ridge Boys
3	1	A Love Song	Kenny Rogers
1	4	Lucille (You Won't Do Your Daddy's Will)	Waylon Jennings
17	—	The Man in the Mirror	Jim Glaser
6	2	Marina del Rey	George Strait
5	11	Midnight Fire	Steve Wariner
7	3	More and More	Charley Pride
20	—	Movin' Train	The Kendalls
23	13	My Baby Don't Slow Dance	Johnny Lee
6	33	My First Taste of Texas	Ed Bruce
9	—	My Lady Loves Me (Just As I Am)	Leon Everette
1	6	New Looks from an Old Lover	B. J. Thomas
1	1	Night Games	Charley Pride
2	1	Nobody but You	Don Williams
2	26	Oh Baby Mine (I Get So Lonely)	The Statler Brothers
1	1	One of a Kind Pair of Fools	Barbara Mandrell
12	42	Only If There Is Another You	Moe Bandy
1	1	Our Love Is on the Faultline	Crystal Gayle
18	—	Outside Lookin' In	Bandana
15	—	Over You	Lane Brody
1	1	Pancho and Lefty	Willie Nelson and Merle Haggard
1	1	Paradise Tonight	Charly McClain and Mickey Gilley
10	11	Personally	Ronnie McDowell
12	—	Poor Side of Town	Joe Stampley
20	13	Potential New Boyfriend	Dolly Parton
19	—	Precious Love	The Kendalls
5	6	Queen of My Heart	Hank Williams, Jr.
6	7	Reasons to Quit	Merle Haggard and Willie Nelson
4	2	The Ride	David Allan Coe
1	1	The Rose	Conway Twitty
6	2	Save Me	Louise Mandrell
5	4	Scarlet Fever	Kenny Rogers
15	6	Shadows on My Mind	Leon Everette
15	10	Shame on the Moon	Bob Seger
3	8	Shine On (Shine All Your Sweet Love on Me)	George Jones
19	—	Shot Full of Love	Nitty Gritty Dirt Band
17	19	Singing the Blues	Gail Davies
5	3	Snapshot	Sylvia
28	14	So Sad (To Watch Good Love Go Bad)	Emmylou Harris
1	2	Somebody's Gonna Love You	Lee Greenwood
9	6	Sometimes I Get Lucky and Forget	Gene Watson
6	9	Sounds Like Love	Johnny Lee
3	17	Still Taking Chances	Michael Martin Murphey
5	1	Stranger in My House	Ronnie Milsap
15	15	Strong Weakness	The Bellamy Brothers
1	4	Swingin'	John Anderson
1	3	Talk to Me	Mickey Gilley
1	1	Tell Me a Lie	Janie Fricke
2	1	Tennessee Whiskey	George Jones
3	24	Thank God for Kids	The Oak Ridge Boys
1	12	'Til I Gain Control Again	Crystal Gayle
10	—	Today My World Slipped Away	Vern Gosdin
10	26	Too Hot to Sleep	Louise Mandrell
4	5	Touch Me (I'll Be Your Fool Once More)	Tom Jones
9	31	Velvet Chains	Gary Morris
5	3	Way Down Deep	Vern Gosdin
1	1	We've Got Tonight	Kenny Rogers and Sheena Easton
3	2	What Am I Gonna Do (With the Rest of My Life)	Merle Haggard
18	—	What I Learned from Loving You	Lynn Anderson
5	3	What She Don't Know Won't Hurt Her	Gene Watson
1	1	Whatever Happened to Old-Fashioned Love	B. J. Thomas
1	5	When I'm Away from You	The Bellamy Brothers
16	—	When You're Not a Lady	Jim Glaser
10	13	Where Are You Spendin' Your Nights These Days	David Frizzell
1	4	Why Baby Why	Charley Pride
3	1	Why Do I Have to Choose	Willie Nelson
7	45	Why Do We Want (What We Know We Can't Have)	Reba McEntire
14	15	Wild Montana Skies	John Denver & Emmylou Harris
4	10	The Wind Beneath My Wings	Gary Morris
7	6	With You	Charly McClain
12	10	Without You	T. G. Sheppard
1	1	You Can't Run from Love	Eddie Rabbitt
4	3	You Don't Know Love	Janie Fricke
10	4	You Put the Beat in My Heart	Eddie Rabbitt
1	9	You Take Me for Granted	Merle Haggard
18	20	You're a Hard Dog (To Keep Under the Porch)	Gail Davies
1	1	You're Gonna Ruin My Bad Reputation	Ronnie McDowell
2	5	You're Out Doing What I'm Here Doing Without	Gene Watson
1	5	You're the First Time I've Thought About Leaving	Reba McEntire
2	1	You've Got a Lover	Ricky Skaggs
5	6	Your Love Shines Through	Mickey Gilley
1	8	Your Love's on the Line	Earl Thomas Conley

=== Singles released by Canadian artists ===
US	CAN	Single	Artist
—	10	Born Again	Terry Sumsion
—	19	Come January (You're My June)	Lou Natale
—	19	Could It Be Love	Kelita Haverland
—	5	Country Fever	Dallas Harms
—	10	Does Your Heart Still Belong to Me	Marie Bottrell
—	8	Dressed to Kill	Gilles Godard
—	12	Everybody Wants to Be Single	Marie Bottrell
—	7	Face in the Mirror	Albert Hall
—	8	Fooling with Fire	Dallas Harms
—	1	Honky Tonkin' (All Night Long)	Dallas Harms
—	18	I Need a Lover	Ronnie Prophet
—	12	I've Already Left You (In My Mind)	Mercey Brothers
86	8	If Tomorrow Never Comes	Ray Griff
1	1	A Little Good News	Anne Murray
—	8	Love Hangover	Carroll Baker
—	18	Loving You Needing You	Eddie Eastman
—	8	Memorized by Heart	Family Brown
—	18	Never Did Like That Train	Murray McLauchlan
—	17	One Less Lonely Night	Jessie Burns
—	17	Only the Names Have Been Changed	Marie Bottrell
—	9	Pressures of Progress	Harold MacIntyre
—	18	Right or Wrong	Carroll Baker
7	3	Somebody's Always Saying Goodbye	Anne Murray
—	9	Two Bits Worth of Hurtin'	Paul Weber
67	4	We Really Got a Hold on Love	Family Brown
—	14	What's He Doin' at the Door	David Thompson
—	9	Where Beauty Lives in Memory	Paul Weber

== Top new album releases ==
US	Album	Artist	Record label
16	20 Greatest Hits	Kenny Rogers	Liberty
9	All the People Are Talkin'	John Anderson	Warner Bros.
2	American Made	The Oak Ridge Boys	MCA
5	Burlap & Satin	Dolly Parton	RCA
5	Cage the Songbird	Crystal Gayle	Warner Bros.
8	Castles in the Sand	David Allan Coe	Columbia
10	Cheat the Night	Deborah Allen	RCA
1	The Closer You Get...	Alabama	RCA
23	Crystal Gayle's Greatest Hits	Crystal Gayle	Columbia
25	A Decade of Hits	Charlie Daniels	Epic
1	Deliver	The Oak Ridge Boys	MCA
22	Dirty Looks	Juice Newton	Capitol
1	Don't Cheat in Our Hometown	Ricky Skaggs	Epic
9	Don't Let Our Dreams Die Young	Tom Jones	Mercury
3	Don't Make It Easy for Me	Earl Thomas Conley	RCA
20	Dream Baby	Lacy J. Dalton	Columbia
10	Exile	Exile	Epic
1	Eyes That See in the Dark	Kenny Rogers	RCA
20	Fool for Your Love	Mickey Gilley	Epic
22	Greatest Hits Vol. II	Larry Gatlin and the Gatlin Brothers	Columbia
4	Greatest Hits Vol. II	Eddie Rabbitt	Warner Bros.
17	Hangin' Up My Heart	Sissy Spacek	Atlantic
15	Hey Bartender	Johnny Lee	Warner Bros.
17	If You're Gonna Do Me Wrong (Do It Right)	Vern Gosdinal	Compleat
9	In My Eyes	John Conlee	MCA
10	It's Only Rock + Roll	Waylon Jennings	RCA
17	John Conlee's Greatest Hits	John Conlee	MCA
2	Keyed Up	Ronnie Milsap	RCA
9	A Little Good News	Anne Murray	Capitol
10	Love Lies	Janie Fricke	Columbia
16	The Man in the Mirror	Jim Glaser	Noble Vision
3	Man of Steel	Hank Williams Jr.	Warner Bros./Curb
16	Movin' Train	The Kendalls	Mercury
13	New Looks	B. J. Thomas	Cleveland Int'l.
20	Night Games	Charley Pride	RCA
22	Old Familiar Feeling	The Whites	Warner Bros./Curb
24	Our Best to You	David Frizzell & Shelly West	Warner Bros./Viva
1	Pancho & Lefty	Merle Haggard & Willie Nelson	Epic
21	Paradise	Charly McClain	Epic
23	Personally	Ronnie McDowell	Epic
1	Right or Wrong	George Strait	MCA
7	Shine On	George Jones	Epic
17	Slow Burn	T. G. Sheppard	Warner Bros./Curb
7	Snapshot	Sylvia	RCA
25	Some Memories Just Won't Die	Marty Robbins	Columbia
3	Somebody's Gonna Love You	Lee Greenwood	MCA
16	Sometimes I Get Lucky	Gene Watson	MCA
5	Spun Gold	Barbara Mandrell	MCA
7	Strong Stuff	Hank Williams, Jr.	Elektra/Curb
5	T. G. Sheppard's Greatest Hits	T. G. Sheppard	Warner Bros./Curb
3	Take It to the Limit	Willie Nelson & Waylon Jennings	Columbia
8	That's the Way Love Goes	Merle Haggard	Epic
10	Today	The Statler Brothers	Mercury
4	Tougher Than Leather	Willie Nelson	Columbia
12	Waylon and Company	Waylon Jennings	RCA
3	We've Got Tonight	Kenny Rogers	Liberty
6	West by West	Shelly West	Warner Bros./Viva
22	White Shoes	Emmylou Harris	Warner Bros.
6	Why Lady Why	Gary Morris	Warner Bros.
3	Without a Song	Willie Nelson	Columbia
6	The Woman in Me	Charly McClain	Epic
8	Wynonna & Naomi	The Judds	RCA/Curb
12	Yellow Moon	Don Williams	MCA
24	You've Really Got a Hold on Me	Mickey Gilley	Epic

=== Other top albums ===
US	Album	Artist	Record label
34	After All This Time	Mel Tillis	MCA
61	All-American Cowboys	Various Artists	Kat Family
41	All-American Redneck	Randy Howard	Warner Bros.
35	All Time Heart Touching Favorites	Roger Whittaker	Main Street
61	Back	Lynn Anderson	Permian
36	Behind the Scene	Reba McEntire	Mercury
48	Better Days	Guy Clark	Warner Bros.
61	Bill Monroe and Friends	Bill Monroe	MCA
57	Classic Conway	Conway Twitty	MCA
70	Classic Country	Albert Coleman's Atlanta Pops	Epic
30	Close Up	Louise Mandrell	RCA
56	Country Boy's Heart	Ronnie McDowell	Epic
63	Country Christmas, Volume 2	Various Artists	RCA
36	Country Classics	Charley Pride	RCA
50	Dangerous	Tony Joe White	Columbia
35	Delia Bell	Delia Bell	Warner Bros.
41	Devoted to Your Memory	Moe Bandy	Columbia
28	The Epic Collection (Recorded Live)	Merle Haggard	Epic
66	Even the Strong Get Lonely	Tammy Wynette	Epic
64	Footprints in the Sand	Cristy Lane	LS/Liberty
30	For Every Rose	Johnny Rodriguez	Epic
27	The Great American Dream	B. J. Thomas	Cleveland Int'l.
33	Greatest Hits	Razzy Bailey	RCA
63	Greatest Hits	Lacy J. Dalton	Columbia
41	Greatest Hits	Johnny Lee	Warner Bros.
67	Greatest Hits	Ray Stevens	RCA
31	Gus Hardin	Gus Hardin	RCA
42	Harvest Moon	Joe Waters	New Colony
27	The Heart Never Lies	Michael Martin Murphey	Liberty
44	Heart to Heart	Merle Haggard & Leona Williams	Mercury
38	Hello in There	David Allan Coe	Columbia
35	I Was the One	Elvis Presley	RCA
55	It's About Time	John Denver	RCA
65	The Jim Reeves Medley	Jim Reeves	RCA
27	Jones Country	George Jones	Epic
34	Leon Everette	Leon Everette	RCA
61	Let the Hard Times Roll	McGuffey Lane	Atco
26	Let's Go	Nitty Gritty Dirt Band	Liberty
36	A Lifetime of Song 1951–1982	Marty Robbins	Columbia
27	Lost in the Feeling	Conway Twitty	Warner Bros.
60	Lyin', Cheatin', Woman Chasin', Honky Tonkin', Whiskey Drinkin' You	Loretta Lynn	MCA
48	Master of the Art	Ray Price	Viva
36	Memory Lane	Joe Stampley	Epic
37	Merry Twismas from Conway Twitty and His Little Friends	Conway Twitty	Warner Bros.
39	Midnight Fire	Steve Wariner	RCA
62	My Fingers Do the Talkin'	Jerry Lee Lewis	MCA
49	The Nashville Sessions	Dean Martin	Warner Bros.
63	Naturally Country	Mel McDaniel	Capitol
65	New Horizons	Dottie West	Liberty
35	...Not the Man I Used to Be	Boxcar Willie	Main Street
32	On My Own Again	David Frizzell	Viva
35	One Particular Harbour	Jimmy Buffett	MCA
32	Over Easy	Terri Gibbs	MCA
34	Ready	Jerry Reed	RCA
40	Rebel Heart	Dan Seals	Liberty
26	Red Hot	Shelly West	Viva
54	Those Were the Days	Gary Stewart & Dean Dillon	RCA
30	Today My World Slipped Away	Vern Gosdin	AMI
26	Too Hot to Sleep	Louise Mandrell	RCA
48	Viva Porter Wagoner	Porter Wagoner	Warner Bros.
48	What Can I Say	Gail Davies	Warner Bros.
29	Wish You Were Here Tonight	Ray Charles	Columbia
64	Work It out with Chet Atkins C.G.P.	Chet Atkins	Columbia
35	You're Not Leavin' Here Tonight	Ed Bruce	MCA

== On television ==
=== Regular series ===
- Hee Haw (1969–1993, syndicated)
- That Nashville Music (1970–1985, syndicated)

== Births ==
- January 29 — Eric Paslay, singer-songwriter of the 2010s.
- March 10 — Carrie Underwood, 2005 American Idol winner, boosting her career.
- June 20 — Grace Potter, rock singer who crossed-over to country with duets with Kenny Chesney.
- June 30 — Cole Swindell, singer-songwriter of the 2010s.
- July 2 — Michelle Branch, member of The Wreckers.
- July 12 — Kimberly Perry, lead singer of The Band Perry.
- October 3 — Drake White, singer known for his single Livin' the Dream.
- November 10 — Miranda Lambert, member of Pistol Annies.
- December 12 — Katrina Elam, singer-songwriter of the 2000s.
- December 29 — Jessica Andrews, popular teen singer of the late 1990s and early 2000s.

== Deaths ==
- April 6 — Cliff Carlisle, 79, country yodeler of the 1930s and steel guitar pioneer.
- October 20 — Merle Travis, 65, singer and composer of classic songs such as "Sixteen Tons", "Dark as a Dungeon", "So Round, So Firm, So Fully Packed" and "Smoke, Smoke, Smoke that Cigarette." (heart attack)

== Country Music Hall of Fame Inductees ==
- Little Jimmy Dickens (1920–2015)

== Major awards ==
=== Grammy Awards ===
- Best Female Country Vocal Performance — "A Little Good News", Anne Murray
- Best Male Country Vocal Performance — "I.O.U.", – Lee Greenwood
- Best Country Performance by a Duo or Group with Vocal — "The Closer You Get", Alabama
- Best Country Instrumental Performance — "Fireball", New South
- Best Country Song — "Stranger in My House," Mike Reid (Performer: Ronnie Milsap)

=== Juno Awards ===
- Country Male Vocalist of the Year — Eddie Eastman
- Country Female Vocalist of the Year — Anne Murray
- Country Group or Duo of the Year — The Good Brothers

=== Academy of Country Music ===
- Entertainer of the Year — Alabama
- Song of the Year — "The Wind Beneath My Wings", Larry Henley and Jeff Silbar (Performer: Gary Morris)
- Single of the Year — "Islands in the Stream", Kenny Rogers and Dolly Parton
- Album of the Year — The Closer You Get..., Alabama
- Top Male Vocalist — Lee Greenwood
- Top Female Vocalist — Janie Fricke
- Top Vocal Duo — Dolly Parton and Kenny Rogers
- Top Vocal Group — Alabama
- Top New Male Vocalist — Jim Glaser
- Top New Female Vocalist — Gus Hardin

=== Canadian Country Music Association ===
- Entertainer of the Year — Family Brown
- Male Artist of the Year — Dick Damron
- Female Artist of the Year — Marie Bottrell
- Group of the Year — Family Brown
- SOCAN Song of the Year — "Raised on Country Music", Family Brown (Performer: Family Brown)
- Single of the Year — "Raised on Country Music", Family Brown
- Album of the Year — Raised on Country Music, Family Brown
- Vista Rising Star Award — Kelita Haverland
- Duo of the Year — Donna & LeRoy Anderson

=== Country Music Association ===
- Entertainer of the Year — Alabama
- Song of the Year — "Always on My Mind", Johnny Christopher, Wayne Carson Thompson and Mark James (Performer: Willie Nelson)
- Single of the Year — "Swingin'", John Anderson
- Album of the Year — The Closer You Get..., Alabama
- Male Vocalist of the Year — Lee Greenwood
- Female Vocalist of the Year — Janie Fricke
- Vocal Duo of the Year — Merle Haggard and Willie Nelson
- Vocal Group of the Year — Alabama
- Horizon Award — John Anderson
- Instrumentalist of the Year — Chet Atkins
- Instrumental Group of the Year — Ricky Skaggs Band

== See also ==
- Country Music Association
- Inductees of the Country Music Hall of Fame
