= List of RPM number-one country singles of 1983 =

These are the Canadian number-one country songs of 1983, per the RPM Country Tracks chart.

Issue date	Title	Artist
January 15	The Bird	Jerry Reed
January 22	A Love Song	Kenny Rogers
January 29	Honky Tonkin' (All Night Long)	Dallas Harms
February 5	Going Where the Lonely Go	Merle Haggard
February 12	Like Nothing Ever Happened	Sylvia
February 19	Inside	Ronnie Milsap
February 26	Inside	Ronnie Milsap
March 5	Faking Love	T. G. Sheppard and Karen Brooks
March 12	If Hollywood Don't Need You (Honey I Still Do)	Don Williams
March 19	Last Thing I Needed First Thing This Morning	Willie Nelson
March 26	The Rose	Conway Twitty
April 2	I Wouldn't Change You If I Could	Ricky Skaggs
April 9	We've Got Tonight	Kenny Rogers and Sheena Easton
April 16	We've Got Tonight	Kenny Rogers and Sheena Easton
April 23	Dixieland Delight	Alabama
April 30	Amarillo by Morning	George Strait
May 7	Whatever Happened to Old-Fashioned Love	B. J. Thomas
May 14	Jose Cuervo	Shelly West
May 21	Whatever Happened to Old-Fashioned Love	B. J. Thomas
May 28	Common Man	John Conlee
June 4	I'm Movin' On	Emmylou Harris
June 11	You Can't Run From Love	Eddie Rabbitt
June 18	Our Love Is on the Faultline	Crystal Gayle
June 25	Stranger in My House	Ronnie Milsap
July 2	You Can't Run From Love	Eddie Rabbitt
July 9	Love is On a Roll	Don Williams
July 16	Fool for Your Love	Mickey Gilley
July 23	Highway 40 Blues	Ricky Skaggs
July 30	The Closer You Get	Alabama
August 6	Pancho and Lefty	Willie Nelson and Merle Haggard
August 13	He's a Heartache (Looking for a Place to Happen)	Janie Fricke
August 20	Love Song	The Oak Ridge Boys
August 27	Lost in the Feeling	Conway Twitty
September 3	Hey Bartender	Johnny Lee
September 10	You're Gonna Ruin My Bad Reputation	Ronnie McDowell
September 17	Why Do I Have to Choose	Willie Nelson
September 24	Night Games	Charley Pride
October 1	Baby What About You	Crystal Gayle
October 8	Don't You Know How Much I Love You	Ronnie Milsap
October 15	Nobody but You	Don Williams
October 22	You've Got a Lover	Ricky Skaggs
October 29	Paradise Tonight	Charly McClain and Mickey Gilley
November 5	Lady Down on Love	Alabama
November 12	Islands in the Stream	Kenny Rogers and Dolly Parton
November 19	Islands in the Stream	Kenny Rogers and Dolly Parton
November 26	One of a Kind, Pair of Fools	Barbara Mandrell
December 3	Tennessee Whiskey	George Jones
December 10	A Little Good News	Anne Murray
December 17	Tell Me a Lie	Janie Fricke
December 24	Black Sheep	John Anderson
December 31	Houston (Means I'm One Day Closer to You)	Larry Gatlin and the Gatlin Brothers

== See also ==
- 1983 in music
- List of number-one country singles of 1983 (U.S.)
