= List of Hot Country Singles number ones of 1983 =

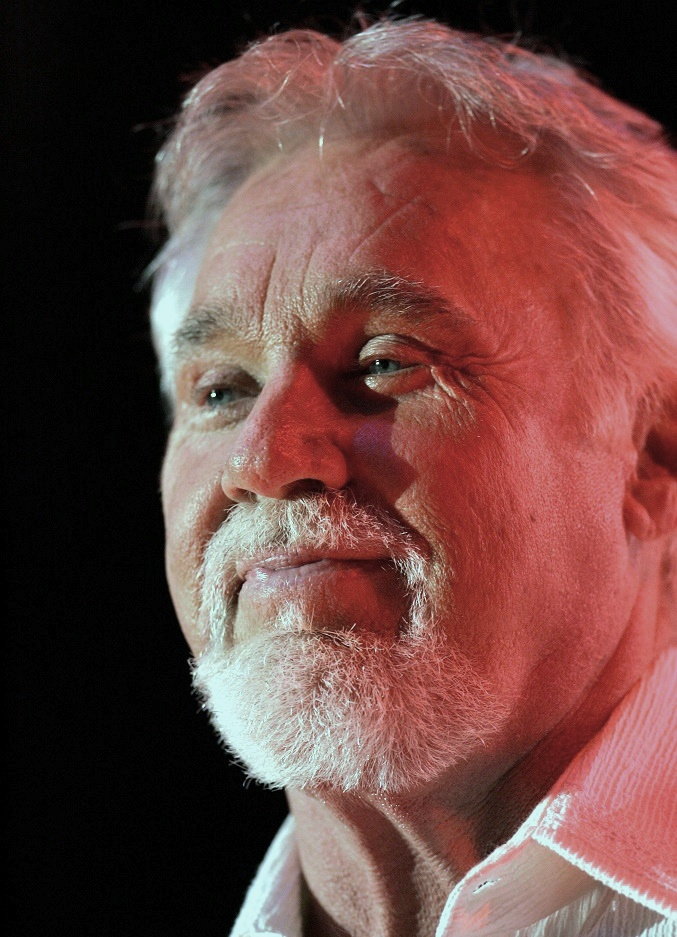
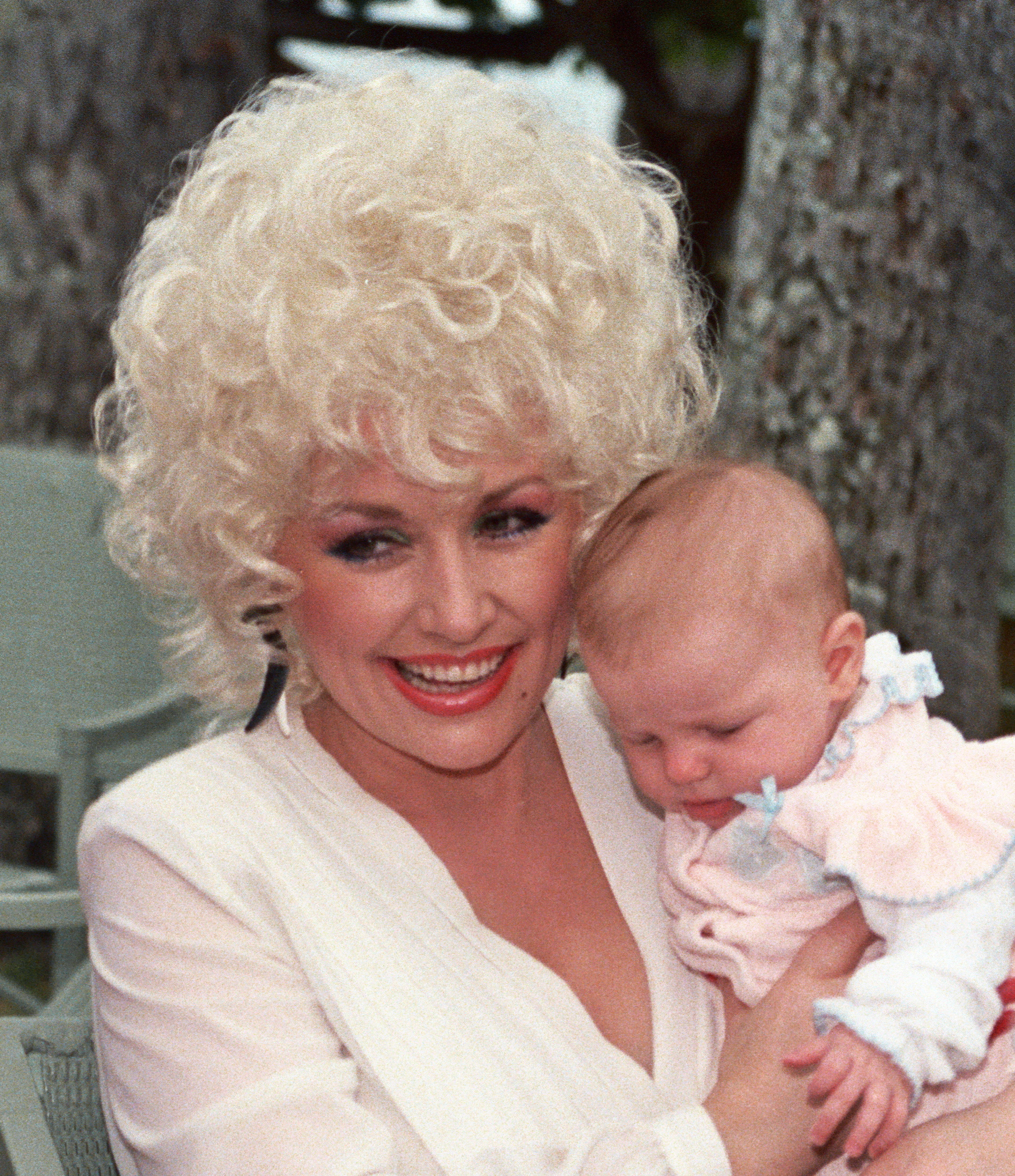
Kenny Rogers and Dolly Parton (pictured in 2006 and 1983 respectively) topped the chart with "Islands in the Stream", which also reached number one on the Billboard Hot 100 and was named the greatest country duet of all time by CMT in 2005.

Hot Country Songs is a chart that ranks the top-performing country music songs in the United States, published by Billboard magazine. In 1983, 50 different releases topped the chart, then published under the title Hot Country Singles, in 52 issues of the magazine, based on playlists submitted by country music radio stations and sales reports submitted by stores.

One of only two singles to spend more than one week at number one in 1983 was "Islands in the Stream", a collaboration between two of country's leading solo singers, Kenny Rogers and Dolly Parton. The song was a considerable crossover success, also topping the Adult Contemporary chart and reaching number one on the all-genres Billboard Hot 100. In 2005 the song topped a poll run by country music television channel CMT of the best country duets of all time. The only other multi-week number one was "Houston (Means I'm One Day Closer to You)" by Larry Gatlin and the Gatlin Brothers, which ended the year in the top spot. Five acts tied for the most number ones of the year, with three each, including Alabama, Crystal Gayle and John Anderson. Mickey Gilley achieved two solo number ones and also teamed with Charly McClain on the chart-topping duet "Paradise Tonight" and Merle Haggard similarly gained two solo number ones and spent a week at the top with "Pancho and Lefty", a collaboration with Willie Nelson.

In addition to the artists who achieved three number ones, Kenny Rogers also spent three weeks at the top, as his two weeks in collaboration with Dolly Parton followed a week spent at number one with "We've Got Tonight", a duet with Sheena Easton. Male-female duets had long been a staple of country music, and a fourth such song to top the Hot Country chart in 1983 was "Faking Love" by T. G. Sheppard and Karen Brooks. In January Reba McEntire topped the chart for the first time with "Can't Even Get the Blues". McEntire would go on to become one of the most successful female singers in country music history, topping the chart regularly for nearly three decades; in 2011 she achieved her 25th number one song, tying with Dolly Parton for the most chart-topping songs by a female artist. While McEntire began a decades-long run of number ones in 1983, several veteran singers added to their extensive tallies of chart-toppers during the year; Merle Haggard's three number ones took his career total to 32 spanning 17 years, and Ronnie Milsap continued a run of number ones which had begun in 1974 and included 13 appearances in the top spot between 1980 and 1984.

== Chart history ==
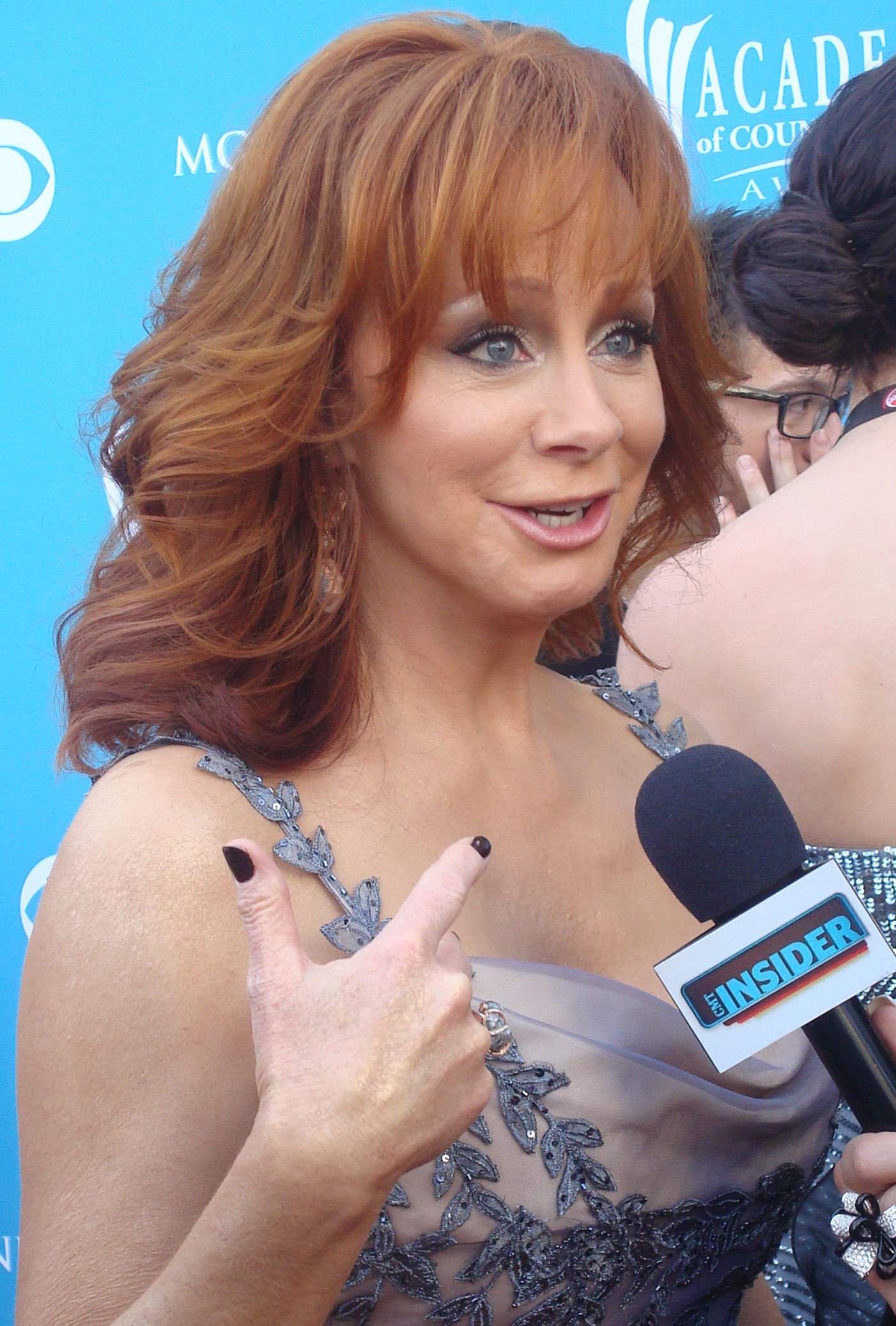
Reba McEntire (pictured in 2010) had the first number one of her career in 1983. She would continue to be a regular chart-topper into the 21st century.

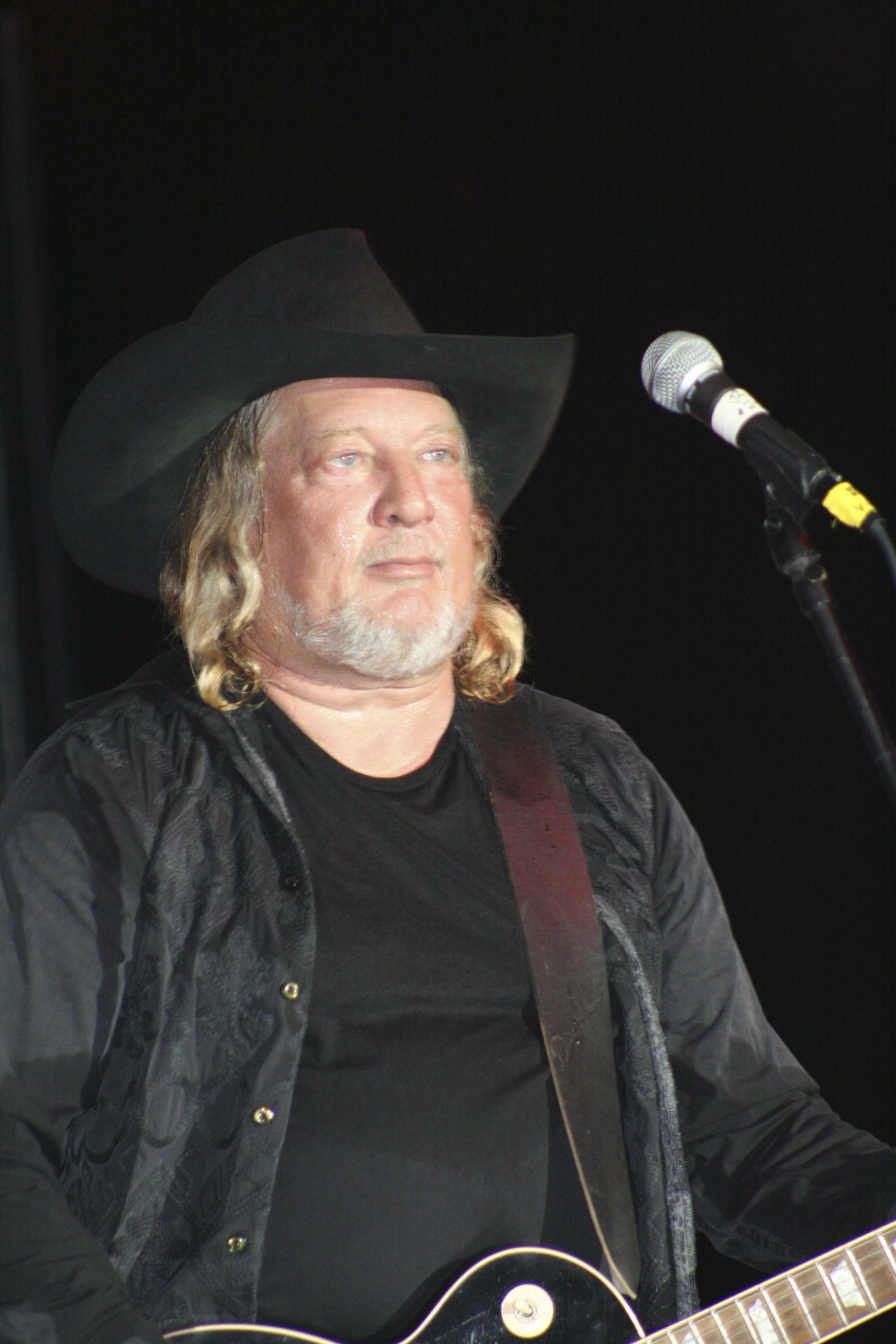
John Anderson (pictured in 2008) had three number ones in 1983.

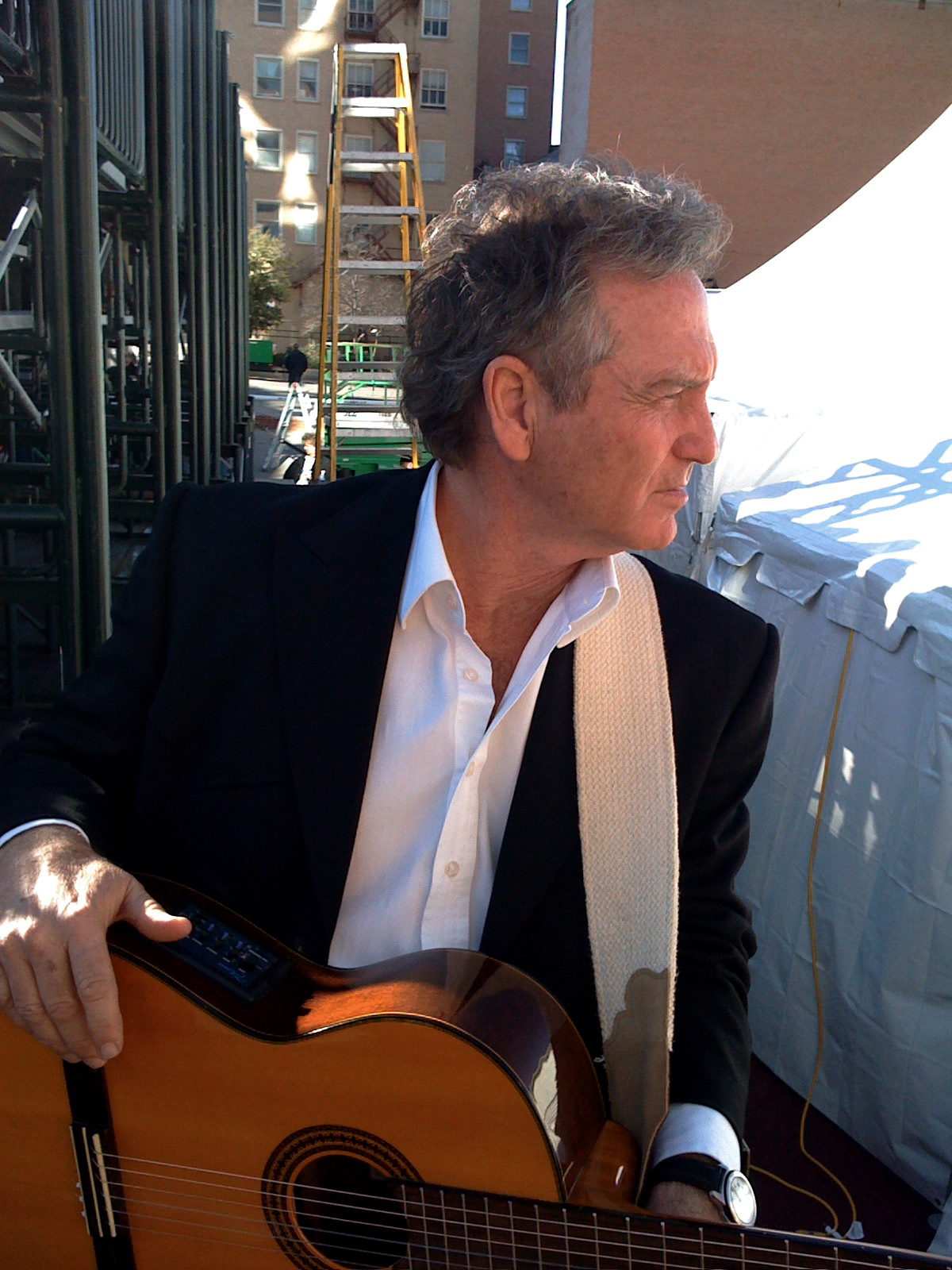
Larry Gatlin (pictured in 2009) and the Gatlin Brothers ended the year at number one.

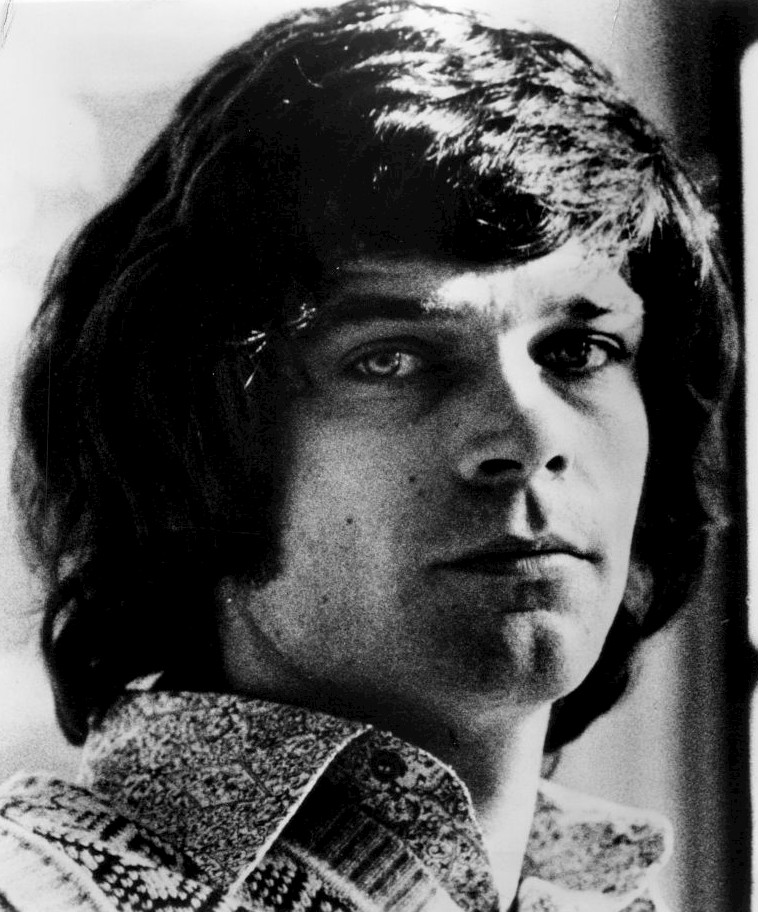
B. J. Thomas (pictured in 1972) had two chart-toppers in 1983.

Issue date	Title	Artist(s)	Ref.
January 1	"Wild and Blue"	John Anderson	
January 8	"Can't Even Get the Blues"	Reba McEntire	
January 15	"Going Where the Lonely Go"	Merle Haggard	
January 22	"(Lost His Love) On Our Last Date"	Emmylou Harris	
January 29	"Talk to Me"	Mickey Gilley	
February 5	"Inside" / "Carolina Dreams"^{[a]}	Ronnie Milsap	
February 12	"'Til I Gain Control Again"	Crystal Gayle	
February 19	"Faking Love"	T. G. Sheppard and Karen Brooks	
February 26	"Why Baby Why"	Charley Pride	
March 5	"If Hollywood Don't Need You (Honey I Still Do)"	Don Williams	
March 12	"The Rose"	Conway Twitty	
March 19	"I Wouldn't Change You If I Could"	Ricky Skaggs	
March 26	"Swingin'"	John Anderson	
April 2	"When I'm Away from You"	The Bellamy Brothers	
April 9	"We've Got Tonight"	Kenny Rogers and Sheena Easton	
April 16	"Dixieland Delight"	Alabama	
April 23	"American Made"	The Oak Ridge Boys	
April 30	"You're the First Time I've Thought About Leaving"	Reba McEntire	
May 7	"José Cuervo"	Shelly West	
May 14	"Whatever Happened to Old-Fashioned Love"	B. J. Thomas	
May 21	"Common Man"	John Conlee	
May 28	"You Take Me for Granted"	Merle Haggard	
June 4	"Lucille (You Won't Do Your Daddy's Will)"	Waylon Jennings	
June 11	"Our Love Is on the Faultline"	Crystal Gayle	
June 18	"You Can't Run from Love"	Eddie Rabbitt	
June 25	"Fool for Your Love"	Mickey Gilley	
July 2	"Love Is on a Roll"	Don Williams	
July 9	"Highway 40 Blues"	Ricky Skaggs	
July 16	"The Closer You Get"	Alabama	
July 23	"Pancho and Lefty"	Willie Nelson and Merle Haggard	
July 30	"I Always Get Lucky with You"	George Jones	
August 6	"Your Love's on the Line"	Earl Thomas Conley	
August 13	"He's a Heartache (Looking for a Place to Happen)"	Janie Fricke	
August 20	"Love Song"	The Oak Ridge Boys	
August 27	"You're Gonna Ruin My Bad Reputation"	Ronnie McDowell	
September 3	"A Fire I Can't Put Out"	George Strait	
September 10	"I'm Only in It for the Love"	John Conlee	
September 17	"Night Games"	Charley Pride	
September 24	"Baby, What About You"	Crystal Gayle	
October 1	"New Looks from an Old Lover"	B. J. Thomas	
October 8	"Don't You Know How Much I Love You"	Ronnie Milsap	
October 15	"Paradise Tonight"	Charly McClain and Mickey Gilley	
October 22	"Lady Down on Love"	Alabama	
October 29	"Islands in the Stream"	Kenny Rogers with Dolly Parton	
November 5	"Islands in the Stream"	Kenny Rogers with Dolly Parton	
November 12	"Somebody's Gonna Love You"	Lee Greenwood	
November 19	"One of a Kind Pair of Fools"	Barbara Mandrell	
November 26	"Holding Her and Loving You"	Earl Thomas Conley	
December 3	"A Little Good News"	Anne Murray	
December 10	"Tell Me a Lie"	Janie Fricke	
December 17	"Black Sheep"	John Anderson	
December 24	"Houston (Means I'm One Day Closer to You)"	Larry Gatlin and the Gatlin Brothers	
December 31	"Houston (Means I'm One Day Closer to You)"	Larry Gatlin and the Gatlin Brothers	

a. Double A-sided single

== See also ==
- 1983 in music
- List of artists who reached number one on the U.S. country chart
