= Lost in the Feeling =

Lost in the Feeling may refer to:

- "Lost in the Feeling" (song), a 1983 song by Conway Twitty
- Lost in the Feeling (Conway Twitty album), 1983
- Lost in the Feeling (Mark Chesnutt album), 2000
- Lost in the Feeling, a 2010 album by Jeri Lynne Fraser
