= Sentimental Ol' You =

Single by Charly McClain

from the album The Woman in Me
- B-side: "I'll Get You Back"
- Released: November 5, 1983
- Genre: Country
- Length: 3:32
- Label: Epic
- Songwriter(s): Bob DiPiero, Pat McManus
- Producer(s): Larry Rogers

Charly McClain singles chronology
"Paradise Tonight" (1983)	"Sentimental Ol' You" (1983)	"Band of Gold" (1984)

"Sentimental Ol' You" is a song written by Bob DiPiero and Pat McManus, and recorded by American country music artist Charly McClain. It was released in November 1983 as the first single from the album The Woman in Me. The song reached #3 on the Billboard Hot Country Singles & Tracks chart.

== Chart performance ==
Chart (1983–1984)	Peak position
US Hot Country Songs (Billboard)	3
Canadian RPM Country Tracks	3
