= The Closer You Get... =

Studio album by Alabama
- Released: March 1983
- Recorded: 1981–1982
- Studio: The Music Mill (Nashville, Tennessee)
- Genre: Country
- Length: 40:53
- Label: RCA Nashville
- Producer: Alabama; Harold Shedd

Alabama chronology
Mountain Music (1982)	The Closer You Get... (1983)	Roll On (1984)

Singles from The Closer You Get...
- 1. "Dixieland Delight" Released: January 28, 1983; 2. "The Closer You Get" Released: April 29, 1983; 3. "Lady Down on Love" Released: August 5, 1983

Professional ratings
Review scores
Source	Rating
AllMusic	4/5 stars

The Closer You Get... is the seventh studio album by American country music band Alabama, released in March 1983. All three singles from this album — "The Closer You Get", "Lady Down on Love" and "Dixieland Delight" — reached number one on the Billboard Hot Country Singles chart in 1983. The album itself reached number ten on the Billboard 200, becoming the band's highest-charting album. Considered a stylistic move towards a more pop-friendly sound, the album was described as a mix of "easy listening" country pop and neotraditional country by AllMusic's Vik Iyengar.

The album was certified quadruple platinum by the Recording Industry Association of America.

== Track listing ==
The Closer You Get... track listing
No.	Title	Writer(s)	Length
1.	"The Closer You Get"	J.P. Pennington, Mark Gray	4:33
2.	"Lady Down on Love"	Randy Owen	4:00
3.	"She Put the Sad in All His Songs"	Robert Byrne, Mac McAnally	4:03
4.	"Red River"	Bud McGuire, George Pearce	4:20
5.	"What in the Name of Love"	Bill Boling, Chris Deal, Rick Wayne	3:54
6.	"Dixieland Delight"	Ronnie Rogers	5:25
7.	"Very Special Love"	Teddy Gentry, Owen	4:50
8.	"Dixie Boy"	Jim McBride	4:20
9.	"Alabama Sky"	Larry Shell	3:21
10.	"Lovin' Man"	Jeff Cook	2:33

== Personnel ==
=== Alabama ===
- Randy Owen – lead vocals, electric guitar
- Jeff Cook – electric guitar, backing vocals, lead vocals (5, 10)
- Teddy Gentry – bass guitar, backing vocals, lead vocals (4, 9)
- Mark Herndon – drums

=== Additional musicians ===
- Shane Keister – keyboards
- Willie Rainsford – keyboards
- Jack Eubanks – acoustic guitar
- George "Leo" Jackson – acoustic guitar
- Dave Kirby – electric guitar
- Fred Newell – electric guitar
- William Adair – bass guitar
- Larry Paxton – bass guitar
- Steve Schaffer – bass guitar
- Hayward Bishop – drums
- Farrell Morris – percussion
- Bruce Watkins – fiddle
- Kristin Wilkinson – string arrangements
- Nashville String Machine – strings

=== Production ===
- Alabama – producers
- Harold Shedd – producer
- Paul Goldberg – engineer
- Gene Rice – engineer
- Randy Kling – mastering at Randy's Roost (Nashville, Tennessee)
- Hogan Entertainment – art direction
- Gabrielle Raumberger – art direction, design
- Moshe Brakha – photography

== Chart performance ==
=== Weekly charts ===
Chart (1983)	Peak position
Canadian Albums (RPM)	17
US Billboard 200	10
US Top Country Albums (Billboard)	1

=== Year-end charts ===
Chart (1983)	Position
US Billboard 200	29
US Top Country Albums (Billboard)	2
Chart (1984)	Position
US Top Country Albums (Billboard)	10

=== Singles ===
Year	Single	Peak chart positions				
Year	Single	US Country	US	US AC	CAN Country	CAN AC
1983	"Dixieland Delight"	1	—	—	1	—
1983	"The Closer You Get"	1	38	9	1	1
1983	"Lady Down on Love"	1	76	18	1	10

=== Certifications ===
Region	Certification	Certified units/sales
United States (RIAA)	4× Platinum	4,000,000^{^}
^{^} Shipments figures based on certification alone.
