= True Love (Crystal Gayle album) =

Studio album by Crystal Gayle
- Released: November 1982
- Studios: Jacks's Tracks, Sound Stage, and Emerald Sound (Nashville, Tennessee).
- Genre: Country
- Length: 33:04 (US edition); 35:58 (UK edition)
- Label: Elektra
- Producers: Jimmy Bowen, Allen Reynolds

Crystal Gayle chronology
| A Woman's Heart (1981) | True Love (1982) | Cage the Songbird (1983) |

Singles from True Love
- 1. "'Til I Gain Control Again" Released: October 27, 1982; 2. "Everything I Own" Released: 1983; 3. "Our Love Is on the Faultline" Released: March 1983; 4. "Baby, What About You" Released: June 1983

Professional ratings
Review scores
| Source | Rating |
|---|---|
| AllMusic | 4/5 stars |

True Love is the tenth studio album by American country music singer Crystal Gayle. Released in November 1982, it peaked at No. 14 on the Billboard Country Albums charts.

Three of the album's tracks reached No. 1 on the Country Singles chart; "'Til I Gain Control Again", "Our Love is on the Faultline" and "Baby What About You".

The oft-covered track "Everything I Own" was released as a single in the UK where it peaked at No. 93 on the UK Singles Chart in early 1983. The song was originally recorded by the band Bread in 1972, and also was a UK No. 1 hit for Ken Boothe in 1974. In 1987, four years after Gayle's version, the song was recorded by Boy George (his first solo recording) who also had a UK No. 1 hit with it.

== Track listing ==
=== US edition ===
| No. | Title | Writer(s) | Length |
|---|---|---|---|
| 1. | "Our Love Is on the Faultline" | Reece Kirk | 3:54 |
| 2. | "Deeper in the Fire" | Don Singleton | 3:26 |
| 3. | "'Til I Gain Control Again" | Rodney Crowell | 3:56 |
| 4. | "Baby, What About You" | Josh Leo, Wendy Waldman | 2:42 |
| 5. | "You Bring Out the Lover in Me" | Charlie Black, Layng Martine Jr. | 2:48 |
| 6. | "True Love" | Craig Morley, Kelly Harland | 2:50 |
| 7. | "Everything I Own" | David Gates | 3:01 |
| 8. | "Let Your Feelings Show" | Roger Cook | 3:24 |
| 9. | "Easier Said Than Done" | Barbara Wyrick, Suzy Storm | 3:54 |
| 10. | "He Is Beautiful to Me" | Bobby Wood, Clive Westlake | 3:09 |

=== UK edition ===
| No. | Title | Writer(s) | Length |
|---|---|---|---|
| 1. | "Our Love Is on the Faultline" | Reece Kirk | 3:54 |
| 2. | "Deeper in the Fire" | Don Singleton | 3:26 |
| 3. | "'Til I Gain Control Again" | Rodney Crowell | 3:56 |
| 4. | "Baby, What About You" | Josh Leo, Wendy Waldman | 2:42 |
| 5. | "You Bring Out the Lover in Me" | Charlie Black, Layng Martine, Jr. | 2:48 |
| 6. | "Take Me to the Dance" | Sharon Ferrara | 2:54 |
| 7. | "True Love" | Craig Morley, Kelly Harland | 2:50 |
| 8. | "Everything I Own" | David Gates | 3:01 |
| 9. | "Let Your Feelings Show" | Roger Cook | 3:24 |
| 10. | "Easier Said Than Done" | Barbara Wyrick, Suzy Storm | 3:54 |
| 11. | "He Is Beautiful to Me" | Bobby Wood, Clive Westlake | 3:09 |

== Personnel ==
- Crystal Gayle – lead vocals, harmony vocals (1, 2, 7)
- Shane Keister – synthesizers (1, 5, 6, 9, 10)
- Charles Cochran – string arrangements (1, 10), keyboards (3, 4, 7, 10)
- Bobby Wood – acoustic piano (3, 4, 6, 7), keyboards (8, 9)
- Chris Leuzinger – lead guitar (1–6, 9), guitars (7, 8, 10)
- Bruce Dees – guitars (1, 5)
- Jon Goin – guitars (2, 6, 8)
- Reggie Young – guitars (3, 4, 7)
- Larry Byrom – guitars (9)
- David Hungate – bass guitar (1, 3, 4, 5, 7, 9, 10)
- Tom Robb – bass guitar (2)
- Tommy Cogbill – bass guitar (6, 8)
- James Stroud – drums (1–5, 7)
- Gene Chrisman – drums (6, 8)
- Tony Newman – drums (9)
- Jay Patten – saxophone (8)
- Al De Lory – string arrangements (7)
- Nashville String Machine – strings (1, 7, 10)
- Kathy Burdick – harmony vocals (1, 5, 9)
- Sherilyn Huffman – harmony vocals (1, 5, 7, 9)
- Paul Davis – harmony vocals (2, 6)
- Rodney Crowell – harmony vocals (3)
- Bill Lamb – harmony vocals (4)
- Roger Cook – harmony vocals (8)
- Louis Nunley – harmony vocals (10)
- Judy Rodman – harmony vocals (10)
- Donna Sheridan – harmony vocals (10)
- Hurshel Wiginton – harmony vocals (10)

Production

- Crystal Gayle – album direction
- Alan Reynolds – producer (1, 2, 5, 6, 8, 9, 10)
- Jimmy Bowen – producer (3, 4, 7), engineer (3, 4, 7)
- Joseph Bogan – engineer (1, 2, 5, 6, 8, 9, 10)
- Ron Treat – engineer (1, 2, 5, 6, 8, 9, 10)
- J.T. Cantwell – second engineer (3, 4, 7)
- Curt Allen – recording, remixing
- John Donegan – technical assistant
- Glenn Meadows – mastering at Masterfonics (Nashville, Tennessee)
- Ron Coro – art direction
- Denise Minobe – art direction, design
- Norman Seeff – photography

== Chart performance ==
| Chart (1982) | Peak position |
|---|---|
| U.S. Billboard Top Country Albums | 14 |
| U.S. Billboard 200 | 120 |
