= Don't Touch Me There =

Single by Charly McClain

from the album Still I Stay
- B-side: "I Know the Way by Heart"
- Released: March 7, 1987
- Genre: Country
- Length: 3:24
- Label: Epic
- Songwriter(s): Michael P. Heeney
- Producer(s): The Sneed Brothers (Dennis Morgan and Stephen Allen Davis)

Charly McClain singles chronology
"So This Is Love" (1986)	"Don't Touch Me There" (1987)	"And Then Some" (1987)

"Don't Touch Me There" is a song written by Michael P. Heeney, and originally recorded by American country music artist Reba McEntire for her 1986 album Whoever's in New England. In March 1987, a version by American country music artist Charly McClain was released as the first single from her album Still I Stay. McClain's version reached number 20 on the Billboard Hot Country Singles & Tracks chart.

== Chart performance ==
Chart (1987)	Peak position
US Hot Country Songs (Billboard)	20
Canadian RPM Country Tracks	19
