= Dancing Your Memory Away =

Single by Charly McClain

from the album Too Good to Hurry
- B-side: "Love This Time"
- Released: June 26, 1982
- Genre: Country
- Length: 3:27
- Label: Epic
- Songwriter(s): Eddie Burton, Thomas Grant
- Producer(s): Norro Wilson

Charly McClain singles chronology
"The Very Best Is You" (1982)	"Dancing Your Memory Away" (1982)	"With You" (1982)

"Dancing Your Memory Away" is a song recorded by American country music artist Charly McClain. It was released in June 1982 as the first single from the album Too Good to Hurry. The song reached number three on the Billboard Hot Country Singles & Tracks chart.

The song was written by Eddie Burton and Thomas Alan Grant for Barnwood Music which is now owned by HoriPro Entertainment. "Dancing Your Memory Away" also won two BMI awards, one at the country awards in Nashville and the other at the pop awards in Beverly Hills, CA. The song was first recorded by Tammy Wynette for her Soft Touch album. The Charly McClain version was produced by Norro Wilson. It has since been recorded by over 30 different artists around the world.

== Charts ==
=== Weekly charts ===
Chart (1982)	Peak position
US Hot Country Songs (Billboard)	3
Canadian RPM Country Tracks	6

=== Year-end charts ===
Chart (1982)	Position
US Hot Country Songs (Billboard)	19
