= Paper Rosie =

Single by Gene Watson

from the album Paper Rosie
- B-side: "Don't Look at Me (In That Tone of Voice)"
- Released: January 22, 1977
- Recorded: November 18, 1976
- Studio: Jack Clement Recording (Nashville, Tennessee)
- Genre: Country
- Length: 3:57
- Label: Capitol 4378
- Songwriter: Dallas Harms
- Producer: Russ Reeder

Gene Watson singles chronology
"Her Body Couldn't Keep You (Off My Mind)" (1976)	"Paper Rosie" (1977)	"The Old Man and His Horn" (1977)

"Paper Rosie" is a song written and originally recorded by Canadian country music artist Dallas Harms. Harms' version peaked at number 21 on the RPM Country Tracks chart in 1975.

The song was later covered by American country music artist Gene Watson. Watson's version released on January 22, 1977, as the first (and only) single and from his album Paper Rosie. Watson's version peaked at No. 3 on the Billboard Hot Country Singles chart in the spring of 1977. It stayed at No. 3 for a total of 3 weeks of the 17 weeks it was on the chart. It also reached number 1 on the RPM Country Tracks chart in Canada.

== Content ==
The song is set at a roadside tavern and is told from the viewpoint of a young man who buys a paper rose from an elderly female vendor. Shortly thereafter, he hears the ringing of church bells and choir voices and realizes a funeral is taking place nearby. When he hears the choir singing "Paper Rosie," he realizes that the funeral is for the woman who'd just sold him the rose. The song suggests that it was actually the spirit of the woman who sold him the paper flower.

== Chart performance ==
=== Dallas Harms ===
Chart (1975)	Peak position
Canadian RPM Country Tracks	21

=== Gene Watson ===
Chart (1977)	Peak position
US Hot Country Songs (Billboard)	3
Canadian RPM Country Tracks	1

=== Year-end charts ===
Chart (1977)	Position
US Hot Country Songs (Billboard)	18
