= When It's Down to Me and You =

1986 single by Wayne Massey and Charly McClain

Single by Charly McClain and Wayne Massey

from the album When Love Is Right
- B-side: "I'll Always Try Forever One More Time"
- Released: March 29, 1986
- Genre: Country
- Length: 3:35
- Label: Epic
- Songwriter(s): Stephen Allen Davis, Dennis Morgan
- Producer(s): Norro Wilson

Charly McClain singles chronology
"So This Is Love" (1986)	"When It's Down to Me and You" (1986)	"When Love Is Right" (1986)

"When It's Down to Me and You" is a song written by Stephen Allen Davis and Dennis Morgan, and recorded by American country music artists Charly McClain and Wayne Massey. It was released in March 1986 as the first single from the album When Love Is Right. The song reached #17 on the Billboard Hot Country Singles & Tracks chart.

== Chart performance ==
Chart (1986)	Peak position
US Hot Country Songs (Billboard)	17
Canadian RPM Country Tracks	27
