= Your Love Shines Through =

Single by Mickey Gilley

from the album Fool for Your Love
- B-side: "Wish You Were Mine Again"
- Released: August 1983
- Genre: Country
- Length: 3:07
- Label: Epic
- Songwriter(s): Wayland Holyfield, Gary Nicholson
- Producer(s): Jim Ed Norman

Mickey Gilley singles chronology
"Fool for Your Love" (1983)	"Your Love Shines Through" (1983)	"You've Really Got a Hold on Me" (1984)

"Your Love Shines Through" is a song written by Wayland Holyfield and Gary Nicholson, and recorded by American country music artist Mickey Gilley. It was released in August 1983 as the second and final single from his album Fool for Your Love. The song reached No. 5 on the U.S. Billboard Hot Country Singles chart and No. 6 on the Canadian RPM Country Tracks chart in Canada.

== Chart performance ==
Chart (1983)	Peak position
US Hot Country Songs (Billboard)	5
Canadian RPM Country Tracks	6
