= Men (Charly McClain song) =

Single by Charly McClain

from the album Women Get Lonely
- B-side: "Come Take Care of Me"
- Released: January 12, 1980
- Genre: Country
- Length: 2:28
- Label: Epic
- Songwriter(s): Jerry Hayes, Ronny Scaife
- Producer(s): Larry Rogers

Charly McClain singles chronology
"I Hate the Way I Love It" (1979)	"Men" (1980)	"Let's Put Our in Motion" (1980)

"Men" is a song written by Jerry Hayes and Ronny Scaife, and recorded by American country music artist Charly McClain. It was released in January 1980 as the third single from the album Women Get Lonely. The song reached #7 on the Billboard Hot Country Singles & Tracks chart.

== Chart performance ==
Chart (1980)	Peak position
US Hot Country Songs (Billboard)	7
Canadian RPM Country Tracks	12
