= Sleepin' with the Radio On =

Single by Charly McClain

from the album Surround Me with Love
- B-side: "That's All a Woman Lives For"
- Released: August 22, 1981
- Genre: Country
- Length: 2:53
- Label: Epic
- Songwriter: Stephen Allen Davis
- Producer: Larry Rogers

Charly McClain singles chronology
"Surround Me with Love" (1981)	"Sleepin' with the Radio On" (1981)	"The Very Best Is You" (1982)

"Sleepin' with the Radio On" is a song written by Stephen Allen Davis, and recorded by American country music artist Charly McClain. It was released in August 1981 as the second single from the album Surround Me with Love. The song reached #4 on the Billboard Hot Country Singles & Tracks chart.

== Chart performance ==
Chart (1981)	Peak position
US Hot Country Songs (Billboard)	4
Canadian RPM Country Tracks	2

== Culture ==
In the television series Hart to Hart, Charly McClain performs the song as singer Lorene Tyler in season 3's episode 7, titled "Rhinestone Harts". The episode first aired on December 1, 1981.
