= Heartache Tonight =

1979 single by Eagles

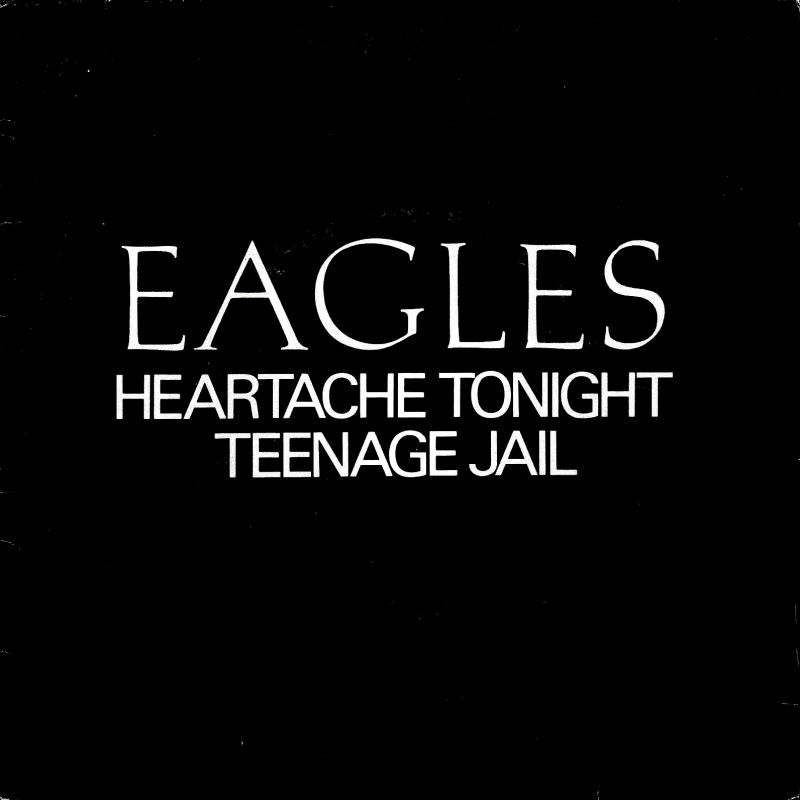
- Sleeve for the French single

Single by Eagles

from the album The Long Run
- B-side: "Teenage Jail"
- Released: September 18, 1979
- Genre: Blues rock; rock and roll
- Length: 4:25
- Label: Asylum
- Songwriters: Don Henley; Glenn Frey; Bob Seger; JD Souther
- Producer: Bill Szymczyk

Eagles singles chronology
"Please Come Home for Christmas" (1978)	"Heartache Tonight" (1979)	"The Long Run" (1979)

Audio
- "Heartache Tonight" by the Eagles on YouTube

"Heartache Tonight" is a song written by Don Henley, Glenn Frey, Bob Seger and JD Souther, recorded by the Eagles and featuring Frey on lead vocals. The track was included on their album The Long Run and released as a single in 1979. It reached No. 1 on the U.S. Billboard Hot 100 in November of that year (their last song to do so) and was certified Platinum by the Recording Industry Association of America representing one million copies sold.

== Composition ==
The song originated from an electric jam session between Frey and Souther, who would visit Frey's home in Los Angeles whenever he was in town on tour. Frey and Souther wrote the first verse while listening to Sam Cooke songs. In the heat of jamming, Frey called Seger on the phone and sang him the verse. Seger then blurted out the chorus. According to Frey, "J.D. [Souther], Don and I finished that song up. No heavy lyrics -- the song is more of a romp -- and that's what it was intended to be." The song was covered by country music singer John Anderson on the tribute album Common Thread: The Songs of the Eagles, by Michael Bublé on his album Crazy Love, and by Tom Jones on his 1980s TV show.

Seger said:

"Heartache Tonight started with me and Glenn at his house. I was playing bass and he was playing guitar. He had this little thing: "Somebody’s gonna hurt somebody." He wanted to write a shuffle. So we’re playing that groove, and Glenn’s singing the verses, and suddenly, out of the blue, the chorus came into my head. "There’s gonna be a heartache tonight, heartache tonight, I know." I started singing that and Glenn goes: “Yeah!”. I took what he was singing about and jumped right into the chorus. Then Glenn called [Joe] Walsh. Now it’s like one o’clock in the morning. Walsh gets up and comes down and starts playing guitar on it, and comes up with the bridge. Then JD Souther came in right after Walsh that same night. He’d help Glenn with lyrics. The next day Henley chimes in and goes: "Oh yeah," and he starts writing a lot of the lyrics. So that’s how that song happened."

== Critical reception ==
Billboard suggested that the handclaps provided "more of a young, vital sound" than previous Eagles' songs and particularly praised the guitar break and the vocal harmonies. Cash Box said it has a "partyin' country-rock groove." Record World highlighted the "slashing rhythm, big beat, whining guitars, & Glenn Frey's tough vocals."

The recording received a 1979 Grammy Award for Best Rock Performance by a Duo or Group with Vocal.

== Personnel ==
- Glenn Frey: lead vocals, rhythm guitar, handclapping
- Don Henley: drums, backing vocals
- Joe Walsh: slide guitar
- Don Felder: rhythm guitar
- Timothy B. Schmit: bass guitar, backing vocals
- Bob Seger: backing vocals (not credited on album liner notes)

== Charts ==
=== Weekly charts ===
Chart (1979)	Peak position
Australia (KMR)	13
Belgium (Ultratop 50 Flanders)	22
Canada Top Singles (RPM)	1
Ireland (IRMA)	10
Netherlands (Single Top 100)	20
New Zealand (Recorded Music NZ)	7
Switzerland (Schweizer Hitparade)	10
UK Singles (Official Charts)	40
US Billboard Hot 100	1
US Adult Contemporary (Billboard)	38

=== Year-end charts ===
Chart (1979)	Rank
Canada	28

Chart (1980)	Rank
US Top Pop Singles (Billboard)	47

== Conway Twitty version ==
"Heartache Tonight"

Single by Conway Twitty

from the album Lost in the Feeling
- B-side: "Hello Darlin'"
- Released: August 1983
- Recorded: February 1–2, 1983
- Studio: Sound Stage Studio (Nashville, Tennessee)
- Genre: Country
- Length: 4:17
- Label: Warner Bros.
- Songwriters: Don Henley; Glenn Frey; Bob Seger; JD Souther
- Producers: Conway Twitty; Jimmy Bowen

Conway Twitty singles chronology
"Lost in the Feeling" (1983)	"Heartache Tonight" (1983)	"We Had It All" (1983)

"Heartache Tonight" was revived four years later in a cover version by country music artist Conway Twitty. Released as the second single from his Lost in the Feeling album, Twitty's version reached No. 6 on the Billboard Hot Country Singles chart in the fall of 1983.

Twitty's version featured the Osmond Brothers on backing vocals. Allmusic reviewer Thom Jurek wrote that "Heartache Tonight" and its follow-up single, "Three Times a Lady," "offer(ed) a solid view of Twitty's amazing crossover potential, and his ability to take well-known pop tracks and turn them into solid country smashes long after the countrypolitan days of Chet Atkins and RCA." In addition to "Three Times a Lady" (a cover of a song by The Commodores), Twitty had successfully covered "Slow Hand" and "The Rose," previously popular hits for the Pointer Sisters and Bette Midler.

=== Charts ===
Chart (1983)	Peak position
US Hot Country Songs (Billboard)	6
Canadian RPM Country Tracks	3
