= Martin County Fair =

Agricultural fair in Florida, United States

Coordinates: 27.1715°N 80.2265°W

The Martin County Fair is one of the largest agricultural fairs in the United States, occurring annually in February in Stuart, Florida. Established in 1960, this Fair is held at the Martin County Fairgrounds across from Witham Airfield. The fair includes rides and food, and features various local talents.

Strict measures, such as social distancing & wearing masks, were undertaken in 2021, but have been suspended since 2022.

Admission to the inaugural 1960 fair cost 50 cents.
