= Surround Me with Love =

Single by Charly McClain

from the album Surround Me with Love
- B-side: "He's Back"
- Released: April 11, 1981
- Genre: Country
- Length: 3:56
- Label: Epic
- Songwriter(s): Wayland Holyfield, Norro Wilson
- Producer(s): Larry Rogers

Charly McClain singles chronology
"Who's Cheatin' Who" (1980)	"Surround Me with Love" (1981)	"Sleepin' with the Radio On" (1981)

"Surround Me with Love" is a song written by Wayland Holyfield and Norro Wilson, and recorded by American country music artist Charly McClain. It was released in April 1981 as the first single and title track from the album Surround Me with Love. The song reached #5 on the Billboard Hot Country Singles & Tracks chart.

== Chart performance ==
Chart (1981)	Peak position
US Hot Country Songs (Billboard)	5
Canadian RPM Country Songs	13
