= The Very Best Is You =

Single by Charly McClain

from the album Surround Me with Love
- B-side: "Love Left Over"
- Released: December 26, 1981
- Genre: Country
- Length: 2:46
- Label: Epic
- Songwriter(s): Frank Stephens, Larry Shell
- Producer(s): Larry Rogers

Charly McClain singles chronology
"Sleepin' with the Radio On" (1981)	"The Very Best Is You" (1981)	"Dancing Your Memory Away" (1982)

"The Very Best Is You" is a song written by Frank Stephens and Larry Shell, and recorded by American country music artist Charly McClain. It was released in December 1981 as the third single from the album Surround Me with Love. The song reached #5 on the Billboard Hot Country Singles & Tracks chart.

== Chart performance ==
Chart (1981–1982)	Peak position
US Hot Country Songs (Billboard)	5
Canadian RPM Country Tracks	20
