= Wayne Massey =

American country music artist and actor (born 1947)

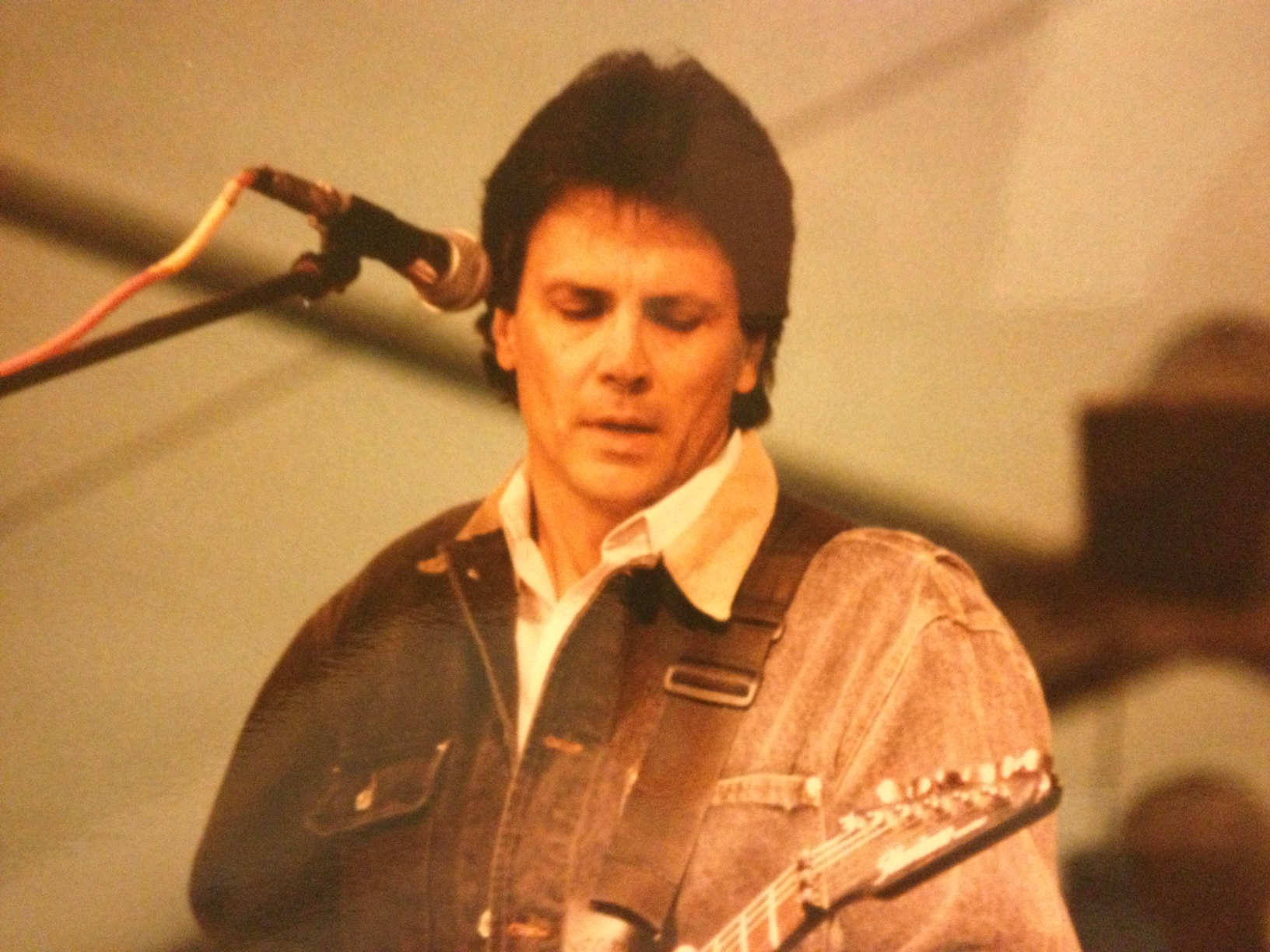
- Massey performing in 1989

Background information
- Born: Donald Wayne Massey; April 10, 1947 (age 79)
- Origin: Glendale, California, United States
- Genre: Country
- Occupations: Singer, actor
- Instruments: Vocals, guitar
- Years active: 1980–present
- Labels: Epic, Mercury, Polydor, MCA, Hanna-Barbera
- Spouses: Andrea Evans (m. 1981–1983) Charly McClain (m. 1984)

Donald Wayne Massey (born April 10, 1947) is an American country music artist and actor. He is best known for playing the role of country/rock music superstar Johnny Drummond on the American daytime soap opera One Life to Live from 1980 to 1984. Massey is also known for his musical collaboration with his wife, country music singer Charly McClain, with whom he charted four duets between 1985 and 1986. He released eleven singles of his own, but never reached the Top 40 alone.

== Career ==
Massey was born in Glendale, California. A graduate of Brigham Young University, Massey had been working in the business world when he was unexpectedly "discovered" and cast in his first acting role as Johnny Drummond on One Life to Live in 1980. During this time, he also starred in a made-for-TV movie called Crossfire. Massey released his first record album Wayne Massey: One Life To Live in 1980, produced by Joel Diamond for Silver Blue Productions. It was also Joel Diamond who turned musical superstar Johnny Drummond on "One Life To Live" into a real music superstar. After leaving the soap opera One Life to Live in 1984, he pursued a singing and producing career in country music for several years. He toured with country singer Charly McClain and topped the charts with four hit duets, the highest-ranking of which was "With Just One Look in Your Eyes" (1985), a number 5 single from McClain's Radio Heart album. Two others — "You Are My Music, You Are My Song" and "When It's Down To Me And You" — were from the couple's 1986 duets album When Love Is Right. He charted nine solo singles between 1980 and 1986, but none reached Top 40, although he was nominated as the Academy of Country Music Top New Male Vocalist for his 1983 single "Say You'll Stay". His final singles "Shoot the Moon" and "Heaven in a Haystack" were released on Mercury Records in 1989, as was his solo album, Wayne Massey and Blackhawk. Massey left the recording industry in the 1990s.

== Personal life ==
Massey was briefly married at age 22 (one son, Judd), and again later to his One Life to Live costar Andrea Evans from 1981 to 1983. He has been married to Charly McClain since July 1984.

== Discography ==
=== Studio albums ===
Year	Album	Peak positions	Label
Year	Album	US Country	Label
1980	One Life to Live	—	Polydor
1986	When Love Is Right (with Charly McClain)	29	Epic
1989	Wayne Massey and Black Hawk	—	Mercury
"—" denotes releases that did not chart

=== Singles ===
Year	Single	Peak positions		Album
Year	Single	US Country	US	Album
1965	"Do the Bomp" (as The Bompers)	—	—	—N/a
1980	"One Life to Live"	—	92	One Life to Live
1981	"Diamonds and Teardrops"	82	—	One Life to Live
1981	"Love So Right"	—	—	One Life to Live
1982	"Easin' on Back"	—	—	—N/a
1982	"It Should Have Been Easy"	—	—	—N/a
1983	"Lover in Disguise"	71	—	—N/a
1983	"Say You'll Stay"	57	—	—N/a
1983	"Spellbound"	—	—	—N/a
1986	"Give It Back"	—	—	—N/a
1989	"Shoot the Moon"	81	—	Wayne Massey and Black Hawk
1989	"Heaven in a Haystack"	—	—	Wayne Massey and Black Hawk
"—" denotes releases that did not chart

=== Singles with Charly McClain ===
Year	Single	Peak positions		Album
Year	Single	US Country	CAN Country	Album
1985	"With Just One Look in Your Eyes"	5	9	Radio Heart
1985	"You Are My Music, You Are My Song"	10	8	Radio Heart
1986	"When It's Down to Me and You"	17	27	When Love Is Right
1986	"When Love Is Right"	74	45	When Love Is Right

== Awards and nominations ==
Year	Organization	Award	Nominee/Work	Result
1984	Academy of Country Music Awards	Top New Male Vocalist	Wayne Massey	Nominated
1986	Music City News Country Awards	Vocal Duo of the Year	Charly McClain and Wayne Massey	Nominated
