= Stephen Allen Davis =

American singer-songwriter (1949–2022)

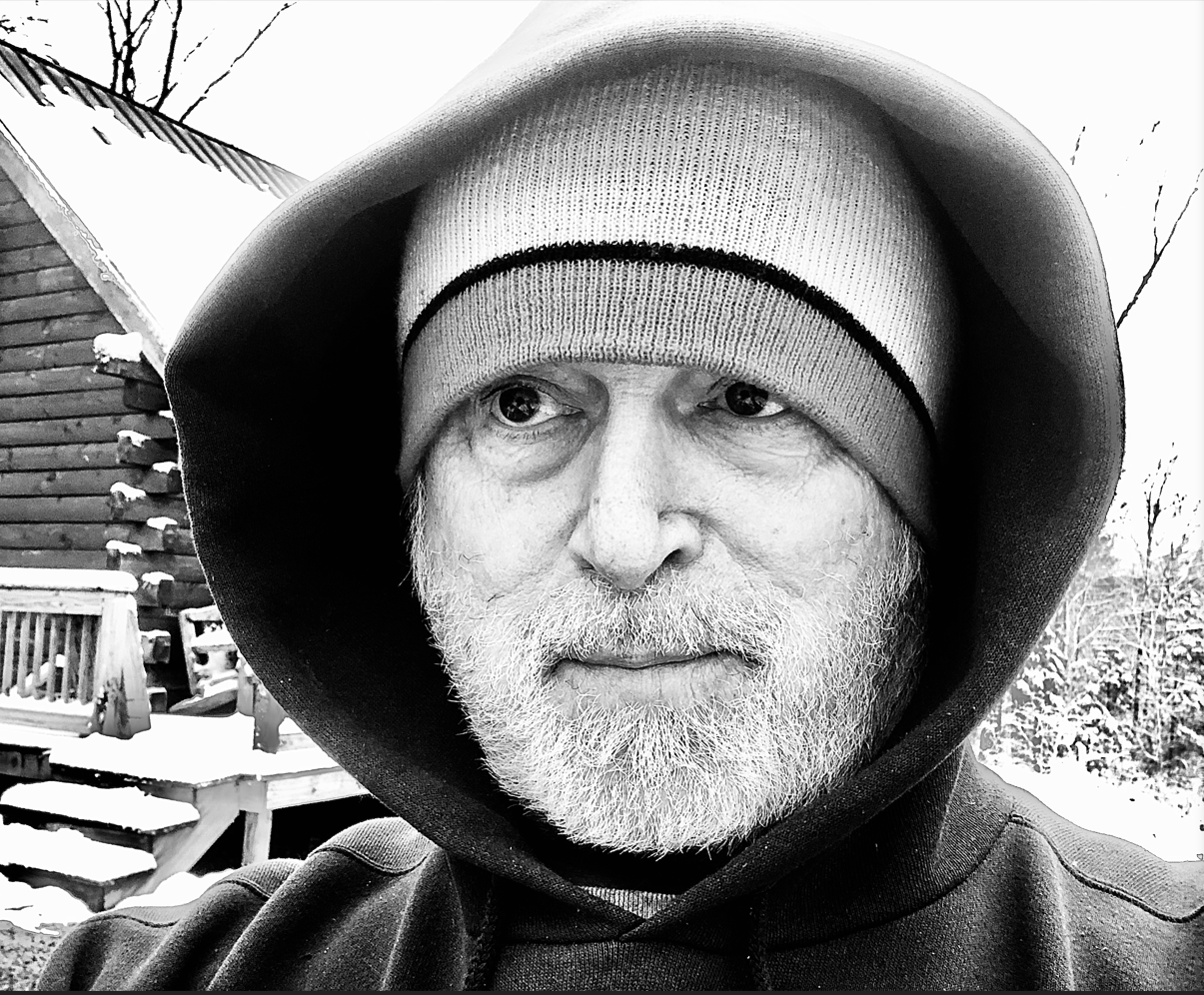
- Davis in 2022.

Background information
- Born: Stephen Allen Davis; October 4, 1949; Nashville, Tennessee, U.S.
- Died: December 26, 2022 (aged 73)
- Genres: R&B, Rock, Pop, Country
- Occupations: Singer, Songwriter, Producer, Publisher, Player, Artist, Recording Engineer
- Instruments: Guitar, Piano, Bass, Vocals
- Years active: 1964–2022
- Labels: Original HomeTown Record
- Formerly of: Joe Cocker, Meatloaf, Tammy Wynette, Jo Dee Mesina, Diana Ross, Alabama, Lonestar, Little Texas
- Website: https://www.sadavis.cloud/

Stephen Allen Davis (October 4, 1949 – December 26, 2022) was an American singer-songwriter. Many of his songs are credited as Steve Davis. He wrote 18 number one songs for various artists, including the single "Stand Beside Me" for country artist Jo Dee Messina, which spent three weeks atop the Billboard Hot Country Singles & Tracks chart and earned Davis a triple Million-Air certificate from BMI for the more than three million performances it has received. The album was also certified Triple Platinum.

== Biography ==
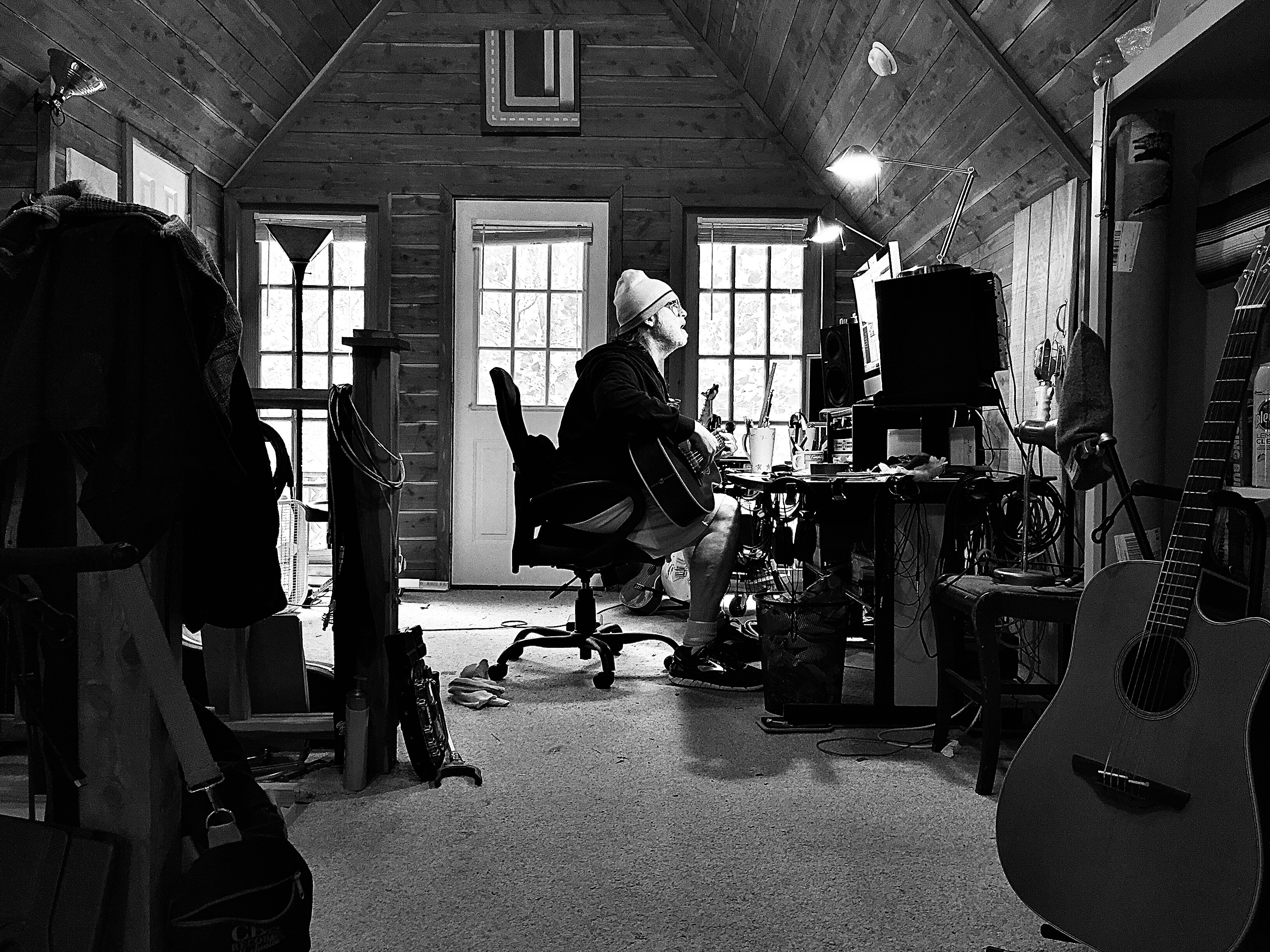
Davis in his recording studio in 2018.

Hailing from Hendersonville, Tennessee, just outside of Nashville, Davis was a nationally ranked tournament water skier in his teens, but after seeing The Beatles on The Ed Sullivan Show, everything changed, and music became his passion. Stephen formed his first combos and started playing at dances and writing songs when he was 14. He got his first professional gig playing bass with a band called "Billy Osbourne and the Tracers," who gigged at the infamous Printer's Alley in Nashville. After spending a summer playing at a biker bar in Indianapolis with the band, Stephen's parents wanted him to return to Nashville to attend college.

Once back in town, Stephen wanted to pursue a full-time music and songwriting career. Davis sought advice from his uncle, ** Harold Bradley, on how to get into the music business. He suggested that Stephen talk to a music publisher. Harold called an old friend of his, Norro Wilson, who ran Al Gallico Music located in New York City but with an active office in Nashville, and set up a meeting for Davis to come into the Gallico Music office on Music Row or 16th Ave as it was called then. That meeting with Norro Wilson led to his first songwriter publishing deal and his first Top #5 record. Davis was awarded two BMI awards for the song in 1968 and 1969. The first award was an R&B award, and the second was a Pop Award. Davis has gone on to earn 17 more BMI awards over the years with three million plus performance songs. That song by Percy Sledge was "Take Time to Know Her". Once the song started moving up the charts, he signed his first major record deal with RCA. He had just turned 18.

Davis had over 400 songs recorded by various artists, including Joe Cocker, Meat Loaf, Tammy Wynette, Reba McEntire, Barbara Mandrell. He also released nine LPs of his own. The Desert Sessions, with a later project bring a live concert that also aired on PBS.

Davis died on December 26, 2022, at the age of 73.

== Selected discography ==
- Music (1970), as Steve Davis
- Double Measure Double Pleasure (1974), as Steve Davis
- The Light Pink Album (1995)

== List of cuts and singles written by Stephen Allen Davis ==
- Jo Dee Messina – "Stand Beside Me"
- Joe Cocker - "Just To Keep From Drowning", "No Ordinary World", I Will Live For You", "Highway, Highway", "The Way Her Love Is", "Different Roads", "Love On A Fade"
- Diana Ross - "The Best Years Of My Life"
- Percy Sledge – "Take Time to Know Her"
- Meatloaf - "Where Angels Sing"
- Tammy Wynette – "One of a Kind", "No One Else in the World"
- Alabama - "Down on Longboat Key"
- Little Texas – "Amy's Back in Austin"
- Reba McEntire – "Just a Little Love"
- Charlie Rich – "Beautiful Woman"
- Barbara Mandrell – "There's No Love in Tennessee", "Only a Lonely Heart Knows"
- Charly McClain – "Sleepin' with the Radio On", "Radio Heart", "With Just One Look in Your Eyes"
- Johnny Rodriguez – "North of the Border", "I Want You Tonight"
- Johnny Duncan – "Hello Mexico (and Adios Baby to You)"
- Joe Stampley – "Dear Woman", "Penny", "Take Time to Know Her"
