= With You (Charly McClain song) =

Single by Charly McClain

from the album Too Good to Hurry
- B-side: "Crazy Hearts"
- Released: October 23, 1982
- Genre: Country
- Length: 2:56
- Label: Epic
- Songwriter(s): Ronald Muir, Larry Shell
- Producer(s): Chucko Productions

Charly McClain singles chronology
"Dancing Your Memory Away" (1982)	"With You" (1982)	"Fly into Love" (1983)

"With You" is a song written Ronald Muir and Larry Shell, and recorded by American country music artist Charly McClain. It was released in October 1982 as the second single from the album Too Good to Hurry. The song reached No. 7 on the Billboard Hot Country Singles & Tracks chart.

== Chart performance ==
Chart (1982)	Peak position
US Hot Country Songs (Billboard)	7
Canadian RPM Country Tracks	6
