= Radio Heart (Charly McClain song) =

Single by Charly McClain

from the album Radio Heart
- B-side: "You Make Me Feel So Good"
- Released: January 1985
- Genre: Country
- Length: 3:12
- Label: Epic
- Songwriter(s): Stephen Allen Davis; Dennis Morgan
- Producer(s): Norro Wilson

Charly McClain singles chronology
"Some Hearts Get All the Breaks" (1984)	"Radio Heart" (1985)	"With Just One Look in Your Eyes" (1985)

"Radio Heart" is a song written by Stephen Allen Davis and Dennis Morgan, and recorded by American country music artist Charly McClain. It was released in January 1985 as the first single and title track from the album Radio Heart. The song was Charly McClain's second number one on the country chart as a solo artist. The single was her final number one and spent one week at number one and spent a total of fourteen weeks on the country chart.

== Charts ==
=== Weekly charts ===
Chart (1985)	Peak position
US Hot Country Songs (Billboard)	1
Canadian RPM Country Tracks	1

=== Year-end charts ===
Chart (1985)	Position
US Hot Country Songs (Billboard)	4
