= You Are My Music, You Are My Song =

"You Are My Song"

Single by Charly McClain with Wayne Massey

from the album Radio Heart
- B-side: "We Got Love"
- Released: November 16, 1985
- Genre: Country
- Length: 3:50
- Label: Epic
- Songwriter(s): David Erwin, Jim Carter
- Producer(s): Norro Wilson

Charly McClain singles chronology
"With Just One Look in Your Eyes" (1985)	"You Are My Song" (1985)	"So This Is Love" (1986)

"You Are My Music, You Are My Song" is a song written by David Erwin and Jim Carter, and recorded by American country music artists Charly McClain and Wayne Massey. It was released in November 1985 as the third single from McClain's album Radio Heart. The song reached #10 on the Billboard Hot Country Singles & Tracks chart.

== Chart performance ==
Chart (1985–1986)	Peak position
US Hot Country Songs (Billboard)	10
Canadian RPM Country Tracks	8
