= Devoted to Your Memory =

Studio album by Moe Bandy
- Released: 1983
- Studio: Woodland (Nashville, Tennessee)
- Genre: Country
- Label: Columbia
- Producer: Ray Baker

Moe Bandy chronology
Sings Songs Of Hank Williams (1983)	Devoted to Your Memory (1983)	Motel Matches (1984)

Devoted to Your Memory is the 22nd album by country singer Moe Bandy, released in 1983 on the Columbia label recorded at Woodland Studio B.

== Track listing ==
1. "Let's Get Over Them Together" - Duet with Becky Hobbs (Charlie Craig, Keith Stegall) - 2:43
2. "One More Port" (Dan Mitchell) - 3:02
3. "Devoted to Your Memory" (Dan Mitchell, Larry Shell) 2:57
4. "Don't Sing Me No Songs About Texas" - Duet with Merle Haggard (Marle Haggard, Leona Williams) - 2:37
5. "That's As Close to Cheatin' As I Came" (Dan Mitchell) - 2:05
6. "You're Gonna Lose Her Like That" (Peggy Forman, Wayne Forman) - 2:25
7. "The Barroom Is My Battleground Tonight" (Tony Austin, Gene Dobbins, Johnny Wilson) - 2:42
8. "Country Side" - Duet with Becky Hobbs (Thom Schuyler) - 3:08
9. "Someone Like You" (Dan Mitchell, D. Lee) - 2:37
10. "She's Looking Good" (Justin Dickens, Rodger Collins) - 2:28

== Musicians ==
- Piano - Bobby Wood, Hargus "Pig" Robbins
- Drums - Kenny Malone, Jerry Carrigan
- Electric Guitar - Reggie Young, Gregg Galbraith
- Steel Guitar - Weldon Myrick
- Acoustic Guitar - Leo Jackson, Ray Edenton, Mark Casstevens
- Bass Guitar - Henry Strzelecki, Mike Leech
- Fiddle - Johnny Gimble, Hoot Hester
- Harmonica - Terry McMillan

== Backing ==
- Strings - The Nashville String Machine
- String Arrangements - Bergen White
- Backing Vocals - The Jordanaires with Laverna Moore.

== Production ==
- Sound Engineers - Rick McCollister, Ron Reynolds, Ed Hudson

== Charts ==
Chart performance for Devoted to Your Memory
Chart (1983)	Peak position
US Top Country Albums (Billboard)	41
