= With Just One Look in Your Eyes =

Single by Charly McClain with Wayne Massey

from the album Radio Heart
- B-side: "Tangled in a Tightrope"
- Released: July 6, 1985
- Genre: Country
- Length: 3:20
- Label: Epic
- Songwriter(s): Stephen Allen Davis, Dennis Morgan
- Producer(s): Norro Wilson

Charly McClain singles chronology
"Radio Heart" (1985)	"With Just One Look in Your Eyes" (1985)	"You Are My Music, You Are My Song" (1985)

"With Just One Look in Your Eyes" is a song written by Stephen Allen Davis and Dennis Morgan, and recorded by American country music artists Charly McClain and Wayne Massey. It was released in July 1985 as the second single from McClain's album Radio Heart. The song reached #5 on the Billboard Hot Country Singles & Tracks chart.

== Chart performance ==
Chart (1985)	Peak position
US Hot Country Songs (Billboard)	5
Canadian RPM Country Tracks	9
