= That's What You Do to Me =

Single by Charly McClain

from the album Let Me Be Your Baby
- B-side: "One Plus One Is Love"
- Released: August 1978
- Genre: Country
- Length: 2:15
- Label: Epic
- Songwriter(s): Johnny MacRae; Bob Morrison
- Producer(s): Larry Rogers

Charly McClain singles chronology
"Let Me Be Your Baby" (1978)	"That's What You Do to Me" (1978)	"Take Me Back" (1978)

"That's What You Do to Me" is a song written by Johnny MacRae and Bob Morrison, and recorded by American country music artist Charly McClain. It was released in August 1978 as the third single from her album Let Me Be Your Baby. The song peaked at number 8 on the Billboard Hot Country Singles chart. It also reached number 1 on the RPM Country Tracks chart in Canada.

== Chart performance ==
Chart (1978)	Peak position
US Hot Country Songs (Billboard)	8
Canadian RPM Country Tracks	1
