= Honky Tonkin' (All Night Long) =

Single by Dallas Harms

from the album Out of Harms Way
- Released: 1982
- Genre: Country
- Label: RCA
- Songwriter(s): Dallas Harms

Dallas Harms singles chronology
"You're a Memory" (1980)	"Honky Tonkin' (All Night Long)" (1982)	"Country Fever" (1983)

"Honky Tonkin' (All Night Long)" is a single by Canadian country music artist Dallas Harms. Released in 1982, it was the first single from his album Out of Harms Way. The song reached #1 on the RPM Country Tracks chart in Canada in January 1983.

== Chart performance ==
Chart (1982–1983)	Peak position
Canadian RPM Country Tracks	1
