= Lost in the Feeling (Conway Twitty album) =

Studio album by Conway Twitty
- Released: 1983
- Recorded: 1983
- Genre: Country
- Length: 30:23
- Label: Warner Bros. Records
- Producer: Conway Twitty, Jimmy Bowen

Conway Twitty chronology
Classic Conway (1982)	Lost in the Feeling (1983)	Merry Twismas (1983)

Singles from Lost in the Feeling
- 1. "Lost in the Feeling" Released: May 28, 1983; 2. "Heartache Tonight" Released: August 1983; 3. "Three Times a Lady" Released: November 1983

Lost in the Feeling is the forty-sixth studio album by American country music singer Conway Twitty. The album was released in 1983, by Warner Bros. Records. Also pictured on the album cover was Naomi Judd of The Judds.

== Track listing ==
No.	Title	Writer(s)	Length
1.	"Lost in the Feeling"	Lewis Anderson	3:08
2.	"The Best Is Yet to Come"	Chester Lester, Tim DuBois	2:44
3.	"You've Got a Good Love Coming"	Danny Morrison, Van Stephenson, Jeff Silbar	2:11
4.	"We're So Close"	Steve Clark, Johnny MacRae	3:24
5.	"Heartache Tonight"	Glenn Frey, Don Henley, Bob Seger, JD Souther	4:15
6.	"A Stranger's Point of View"	Jake Brooks, Rick Carnes	3:03
7.	"I Think I'm in Love"	Charlie Craig, Keith Stegall	2:40
8.	"Three Times a Lady"	Lionel Richie	3:39
9.	"First Things First"	Rafe Van Hoy, Don Cook	2:20
10.	"Don't It Feel Good"	Don Singleton	2:29
Total length:			30:23

== Charts ==
Chart (1983)	Peak position
US Top Country Albums (Billboard)	27
