= Dallas Harms =

Canadian singer-songwriter (1935–2019)

- Born: Dallas Leon Harms; July 18, 1935; Jansen, Saskatchewan, Canada
- Died: October 12, 2019 (aged 84) Hamilton, Ontario, Canada
- Genres: Country
- Occupation: Singer-songwriter
- Instrument: Guitar
- Years active: 1959–1984
- Labels: Columbia; Broadland; RCA

Dallas Harms (July 18, 1935 – October 12, 2019) was a Canadian country music singer-songwriter. Twenty of Harms' singles made the RPM Country Tracks charts, including the number one single "Honky Tonkin' (All Night Long)". Harms was inducted into the Canadian Country Music Hall of Fame in 1989.

Harms was born in Jansen, Saskatchewan, but was raised in Hamilton, Ontario, and was awarded the Hamilton Music Awards Lifetime Achievement Award for 2016. He died in Hamilton on October 12, 2019.

== Discography ==
=== Albums ===
Year	Album	CAN Country
1975	Paper Rosie	—
1978	The Fastest Gun	11
1979	Painter of Words	—
1982	Out of Harms Way	—

=== Singles ===
Year	Single	Peak positions	
Year	Single	CAN Country	CAN AC
1972	"In the Loving Arms of My Marie"	8	—
1973	"Old Ira Gray"	15	18
1973	"Little Annie Brown"	29	—
1974	"Ruby's Lips"	35	—
1975	"Paper Rosie"	21	—
1976	"Georgia I'm Cheating on You Tonight"	28	—
1977	"Julie I Think It's Going to Rain"	23	—
1977	"It's Crying Time for Me"	9	—
1978	"Master of the Classical Guitar"	18	41
1978	"The Fastest Gun"	9	—
1978	"I Picked a Daisy"	7	—
1979	"Lean on Me"	23	—
1979	"The Ballad of the Duke"	6	28
1979	"Rendezvous for Lovers"	45	—
1980	"Shelley's Last Request"	31	—
1980	"You're a Memory"	27	—
1982	"Honky Tonkin' (All Night Long)"	1	—
1983	"Country Fever"	5	—
1983	"Fooling with Fire"	8	—
1984	"Get Along Little Doggie"	14	—
