= Paradise Tonight =

Single by Charly McClain with Mickey Gilley

from the album Paradise
- B-side: "Four Seasons of Love"
- Released: June 1983
- Genre: Country
- Length: 2:58
- Label: Epic
- Songwriter(s): Bill Kenner; Mark Wright
- Producer(s): Chucko Productions

Charly McClain singles chronology
"Fly into Love" (1983)	"Paradise Tonight" (1983)	"Sentimental Ol' You" (1983)

Mickey Gilley singles chronology
"Fool for Your Love" (1983)	"Paradise Tonight" (1983)	"Your Love Shines Through" (1983)

"Paradise Tonight" is a song written by Bill Kenner and Mark Wright, and recorded by American country music artists Charly McClain and Mickey Gilley. It was released in June 1983 as the second single from McClain's album Paradise. The song was the most successful of three releases by McClain and Gilley as a duo. The single went to number one for one week and stayed a total of thirteen weeks on the top 40 country chart.

== Charts ==
=== Weekly charts ===
Chart (1983)	Peak position
US Hot Country Songs (Billboard)	1
Canadian RPM Country Tracks	1

=== Year-end charts ===
Chart (1983)	Position
US Hot Country Songs (Billboard)	21
