= Dixieland Delight =

1983 single by Alabama

Single by Alabama

from the album The Closer You Get...
- B-side: "Very Special Love"
- Released: January 28, 1983 (U.S.)
- Recorded: 1982
- Genre: Country, country rock, bluegrass
- Length: 3:57 (single edit); 5:23 (album version)
- Label: RCA Nashville
- Songwriter: Ronnie Rogers
- Producers: Harold Shedd and Alabama

Alabama singles chronology
"Christmas in Dixie" (1982)	"Dixieland Delight" (1983)	"The Closer You Get" (1983)

Audio
- "Dixieland Delight" on YouTube

Music video
- "Dixieland Delight" on YouTube

"Dixieland Delight" is a song by American country music band Alabama. Written by Ronnie Rogers, it was released on January 28, 1983, by RCA Nashville Records as the lead single for Alabama's seventh studio album, The Closer You Get....

"Dixieland Delight" drew commercial success, peaking at number one on the Billboard Hot Country Songs list amongst the release of the album in April 1983. After its release, the song became a college football tradition within Southeastern Conference fanbases, most notably within the fanbase of the Alabama Crimson Tide.

== Background and composition ==
"Dixieland Delight" was written by Ronnie Rogers, who previously had hits with various artists. Rogers stated that the idea for "Dixieland Delight" came to him while driving on U.S. Route 11W, a rural highway within the state of Tennessee. According to Rogers in later interviews, the song is inspired by the town of Leiper's Fork, Tennessee, and a dead-end road that Rogers was driving through that spurred him to write the first lyrics of the song. He finished half of the song within the day, and was eventually convinced by a friend of his to complete the song. Rogers later completed the song after heading out into the woodlands, inspired by the animals within the area.

The song officially released on January 28, 1983 as a lead-off single for The Closer You Get..., Alabama's seventh studio album. When Alabama recorded the song in 1982 for The Closer You Get..., it differed substantially from the acoustic demo cut by Rogers. The song's title refers to the girlfriend of the singer. Later in the song, Rogers conjures up images of various forest animals, such as a white-tailed buck deer and a red-tailed hawk, and how they bring peace to him before returning to how the main character plans to become intimate with his girlfriend during their weekend outing, in a truck in a meadow. The song picks up the tempo midway through with a fiddle bridge before a reprisal of the refrain.

== Cover versions ==
Country music singer Riley Green covered the song from the television special CMT Giants: Alabama.

== Music video ==
An accompanying music video directed by David Hogan was filmed for the song. Production for the music video of "Dixieland Delight" took place in the city of Fort Payne, Alabama.

== Critical reception ==
"Dixieland Delight" has drawn mixed reception. Upon The Closer You Get...'s release, Ken Tucker, writer for Knight Ridder, stated that the song was an example of "how unadventurous the country-music audience can be nowadays... [it's a] bland, pretty tune calculated to appeal to the broadest audience imaginable." In 2019, Rolling Stone placed "Dixieland Delight" seventh on in their 25 Best Songs About the South ranking, describing it as an example of "high-octane, country-rock number with a hint of bluegrass that are so distinctly from the lower half of the Mason–Dixon they smell like whiskey and wisteria."

In April 1983, "Dixieland Delight" became Alabama's ninth No. 1 song on Billboard magazine's Hot Country Singles chart.

== Legacy and college football phenomenon ==
"Dixieland Delight" has been remarked by writer Tom Roland as one of the band Alabama's most enduring singles, and is closely associated with 1980s country music as a whole. The song has been referenced in Brad Paisley's "Old Alabama" and Midland's "Make a Little". In 2018, the song's publishing rights, which were once owned by two different companies, but then later solely reverted to Rogers, were sold to Downtown Music, a global independent rights management and music services company. Roland considered the deal unusual, citing it as a rare example of a single song deal. Roland noted that Downtown "expects to garner favorable placements and higher visibility by highlighting its attributes."

=== University of Alabama tradition ===
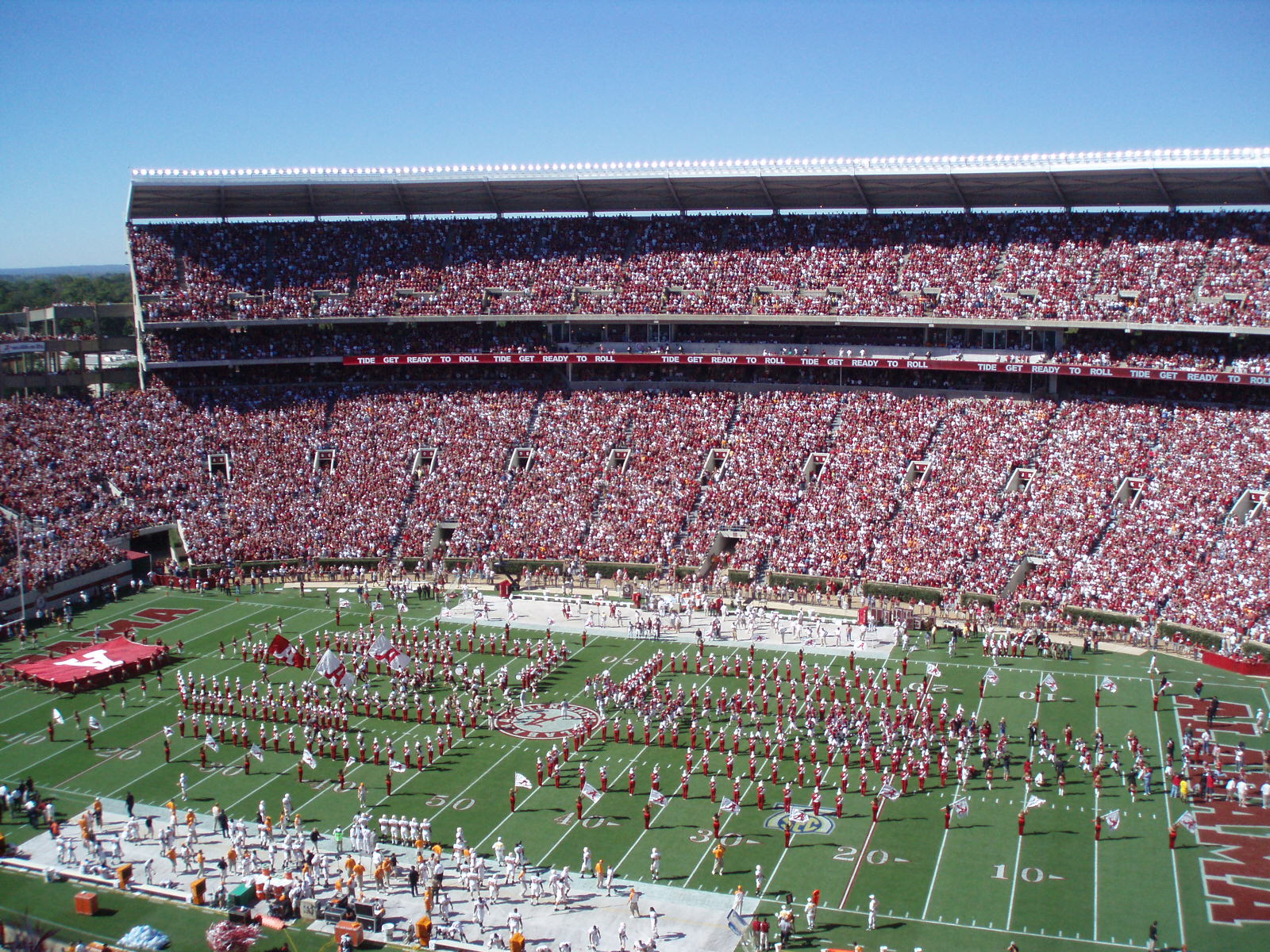
The song has become a tradition of the University of Alabama.

In an article for the American Songwriter, immediately after the song was released, the song would catch on like "the wave" with the University of Alabama fanbase; particularly its football fanbase, as "It just [made] sense... Alabama, the country trio, and Alabama, the college football team, have more than a name in common. They both have pride: in where they came from and in being the best," referring to the relative dominance and success of the Alabama Crimson Tide in American college football.

The song is played regularly at Crimson Tide home football games during the intermission between the third and fourth quarters of games. Throughout its time as a tradition the University of Alabama, fans made chants to chant while the song was playing. Some chants later become controversial, as profanity was used in the chants; particularly, a widely used chant had fans chanting after the line "a little turtle dovin' on a Mason–Dixon night" profanities at their college conference rivals within the Southeastern Conference (SEC). While popular with the student fanbase, it drew complaints from other fans and officials.

Specifically, the modified lyrics are:

Spend my dollar ("On beer!")
Parked in a holler 'neath the mountain moonlight ("Roll Tide!")
Hold her uptight ("Against the wall!")
Make a little lovin' ("All night!")
A little turtle dovin' on a Mason-Dixon night ("Fuck Auburn!")
Fits my life ("And LSU!")
Oh so right ("And Tennessee, too!")
My Dixieland Delight

As a result, Alabama Assistance Director of Marketing Ryan Majercik ordered the university to drop the tradition at the end of 2014 until further notice. The song was reinstated three years later, with university officials pleading spectators to chant a modified version.

The song has been used by other universities to mock the tradition. The University of Tennessee has recently mocked the University of Alabama for using the song as a stadium tradition, with the university's fanbase poking fun at the fact that "Dixieland Delight" mentions the state of Tennessee multiple times, but never Alabama. The song was played at Neyland Stadium in 2022 after Tennessee broke an unprecedented 15-year losing streak against Alabama. Other universities have also created chants parodying Alabama's chant for the song, with the chant being flipped to say "Fuck 'Bama!"

== Charts ==
=== Weekly charts ===
Chart (1983)	Peak position
US Hot Country Songs (Billboard)	1
Canadian RPM Country Tracks	1

=== Year-end charts ===
Chart (1983)	Position
US Hot Country Songs (Billboard)	31

== Certifications ==
Certifications for Dixieland Delight
Region	Certification	Certified units/sales
United States (RIAA)	Platinum	1,000,000^{‡}
^{‡} Sales+streaming figures based on certification alone.
