= Lost in the Feeling (song) =

Single by Conway Twitty

from the album Lost in the Feeling
- B-side: "You've Never Been This Far Before"
- Released: May 28, 1983
- Genre: Country
- Length: 3:11
- Label: Elektra
- Songwriter: Lewis Anderson
- Producers: Conway Twitty, Jimmy Bowen

Conway Twitty singles chronology
"We Had It All" (1983)	"Lost in the Feeling" (1983)	"Heartache Tonight" (1983)

"Lost in the Feeling" is a song written by Lewis Anderson, and recorded by American country music artist Conway Twitty. It was released in May 1983 as the first single and title track from the album Lost in the Feeling. The song reached #2 on the Billboard Hot Country Singles & Tracks chart.

A cover by Mark Chesnutt peaked at number 59 on the Billboard Hot Country Singles & Tracks chart in 2000 as a tribute to Twitty. Chesnutt also made a music video which featured clips of Twitty.

== Chart performance ==
=== Conway Twitty ===
Chart (1983)	Peak position
US Hot Country Songs (Billboard)	2
Canadian RPM Country Tracks	1

=== Year-end charts ===
Chart (1983)	Position
US Hot Country Songs (Billboard)	16

=== Mark Chesnutt ===
Chart (2000)	Peak position
US Hot Country Songs (Billboard)	59
