= Lady Down on Love =

Single by Alabama

from the album The Closer You Get...
- B-side: "Lovin' Man"
- Released: August 5, 1983
- Recorded: 1982
- Genre: Country
- Length: 3:57
- Label: RCA Nashville
- Songwriter(s): Randy Owen
- Producer(s): Harold Shedd and Alabama

Alabama singles chronology
"The Closer You Get" (1983)	"Lady Down on Love" (1983)	"Roll On (Eighteen Wheeler)" (1984)

"Lady Down on Love" is a song written by Randy Owen and recorded by American country music band Alabama. It was released in August 1983 as the third and final single from Alabama's album The Closer You Get....

== About the song ==
"Lady Down on Love" is a song about divorce – told first from her side and, in the second verse, his side.

Songwriter Randy Owen recalled to country music journalist Tom Roland that the idea for the song came about when, during a performance at a hotel nightclub in Bowling Green, Kentucky, he learned that a group of women were celebrating a friend's divorce with a night out on the town. However, the divorcée was not having a good time, because she was mourning the end of her marriage and thinking about what should have been – that she should be at home with her husband.

== Content ==
In the song's first verse, the unnamed woman is just divorced and is observing her first night on the town since her marriage at age 18. She is resigned to having lost time to achieve her hopes and dreams, and now with her long-lived marital ties now broken, she doesn't know how to act, much less achieve her goals. She reflects on the night her now ex-husband asked her to marry ... and now older and wiser is stunned to realize that the love in her marriage had died so soon.

The second verse, told from the first-person point of view of the husband, reflects on how the marriage used to have love and that he offered "that special touch." However, work commitments keep him away from home for days at a time, the two grow lonely for each other ... then he makes the mistake of falling for another woman. In the end, the husband admits "she just couldn't live with a man she couldn't trust."

The refrain recalls Owen's interaction with the woman in the nightclub ("She's got her freedom, but she'd rather be bound/To a man that would love her and never let her down").

== Chart performance ==
Chart (1983)	Peak position
US Hot Country Songs (Billboard)	1
US Billboard Hot 100	76
US Adult Contemporary (Billboard)	18
Canadian RPM Country Tracks	1
Canadian RPM Adult Contemporary Tracks	10
