= Baby, What About You =

Country hit single by Crystal Gayle

Single by Crystal Gayle

from the album True Love
- B-side: "He Is Beautiful to Me"
- Released: June 1983
- Genre: Country
- Length: 2:42
- Label: Elektra
- Songwriter(s): Josh Leo; Wendy Waldman
- Producer(s): Jimmy Bowen; Allen Reynolds

Crystal Gayle singles chronology
"Our Love Is on the Faultline" (1983)	"Baby, What About You" (1983)	"The Sound of Goodbye" (1983)

"Baby, What About You" is a song written by Josh Leo and Wendy Waldman, and recorded by American country music artist Crystal Gayle. It was released in June 1983 as the third single from the album True Love. The song was Gayle's twelfth number one on the country chart. The single went to number one for one week and spent a total of twelve weeks on the country chart.

== Charts ==
=== Weekly charts ===
Chart (1983)	Peak position
US Hot Country Songs (Billboard)	1
US Billboard Hot 100	83
US Adult Contemporary (Billboard)	9
Canadian RPM Country Tracks	1
Canadian RPM Adult Contemporary Tracks	9

=== Year-end charts ===
Chart (1983)	Position
US Hot Country Songs (Billboard)	46
