= The Closer You Get (song) =

1983 song by J.P. Pennington and Mark Gray

Song by Exile

from the album Don't Leave Me This Way
- Released: 1980
- Recorded: 1980
- Genre: Pop rock
- Length: 4:13
- Label: Warner Bros.
- Songwriters: J.P. Pennington; Mark Gray
- Producer: Peter Coleman

"The Closer You Get"

Single by Alabama

from the album The Closer You Get...
- B-side: "You Turn Me On"
- Released: April 29, 1983
- Recorded: 1982
- Genre: Country rock
- Length: 3:35 (single edit); 4:33 (album version)
- Label: RCA Nashville
- Songwriters: J.P. Pennington, Mark Gray
- Producers: Harold Shedd and Alabama

Alabama singles chronology
"Dixieland Delight" (1983)	"The Closer You Get" (1983)	"Lady Down on Love" (1983)

"The Closer You Get" is a song written by J.P. Pennington and Mark Gray and recorded by American band Exile in 1980. The song was most notably covered by American country music band Alabama and released in April 1983 as the title track and second single from the album The Closer You Get....

== About the song ==
"The Closer You Get" was written in 1980 by J.P. Pennington and Mark Gray, members of Exile. However, the song was not immediately recorded by Alabama. Two earlier versions were released as singles – the first by Exile (which failed to gain much attention) and singer Don King, whose version reached No. 27 on the Billboard Hot Country Singles chart in October 1981. In addition, Rita Coolidge recorded the song for her 1981 album, Heartbreak Radio, and released her version as a single.

Alabama's version differed substantially from King's acoustic version. According to country music writer Tom Roland, the song featured "distorted guitars, a more elaborate arrangement and an altered vocal sound."

The end result was Alabama's tenth No. 1 song on the Billboard Hot Country Singles chart. In addition, "The Closer You Get" registered enough airplay on Top 40 radio stations to peak at No. 38 on the Billboard Hot 100.

A music video was filmed for the song, and has aired on CMT and Great American Country.

== Cover versions ==
Country music band Eli Young Band covered the song from the Alabama & Friends album. Country music band Little Big Town covered the song from the television special CMT Giants: Alabama.

== Single and album edits ==
The single version is a minute shorter than the original album version; the first verse and the second refrain is deleted from the single. The single edit is included on many of Alabama's compilation albums, including Greatest Hits Vol. II and For the Record.

== Chart performance ==
=== Rita Coolidge ===
Chart (1981)	Peak position
US Bubbling Under Hot 100 (Billboard)	3

=== Don King ===
Chart (1981)	Peak position
US Hot Country Songs (Billboard)	27

=== Alabama ===
Chart (1983)	Peak position
US Hot Country Songs (Billboard)	1
US Billboard Hot 100	38
US Adult Contemporary (Billboard)	9
Canadian RPM Country Tracks	1
Canadian RPM Adult Contemporary Tracks	1

=== Year-end charts ===
Chart (1983)	Position
US Hot Country Songs (Billboard)	47
