= Our Love Is on the Faultline =

Single by Crystal Gayle

from the album True Love
- B-side: "Deeper in Fire"
- Released: March 1983
- Genre: Country
- Length: 3:54
- Label: Elektra
- Songwriter: Reece Kirk
- Producers: Jimmy Bowen; Allen Reynolds

Crystal Gayle singles chronology
"Everything I Own" (1983)	"Our Love Is on the Faultline" (1983)	"Baby, What About You" (1983)

"Our Love Is on the Faultline" is a song written by Reece Kirk, and recorded by American country music artist Crystal Gayle. It was released in March 1983 as the second single from the album True Love. The song was Gayle's eleventh number one on the country chart. The single stayed at number one for one week and spent a total of twelve weeks on the country chart.

== Charts ==
=== Weekly charts ===
Chart (1983)	Peak position
US Hot Country Songs (Billboard)	1
US Adult Contemporary (Billboard)	23
Canadian RPM Country Tracks	1

=== Year-end charts ===
Chart (1983)	Position
US Hot Country Songs (Billboard)	39
