= Fool for Your Love =

Single by Mickey Gilley

from the album Fool for Your Love
- B-side: "Shakin' a Heartache"
- Released: March 1983
- Genre: Country
- Length: 3:20
- Label: Epic
- Songwriter(s): Don Singleton
- Producer(s): Jim Ed Norman

Mickey Gilley singles chronology
"Talk to Me" (1982)	"Fool for Your Love" (1983)	"Paradise Tonight" (1983)

"Fool For Your Love" is a song written by Don Singleton, and recorded by American country music artist Mickey Gilley. It was released in March 1983 as the first single and title track from the album Fool for Your Love. The song was Gilley's sixteenth number one country single as a solo artist. The single went to number one for one week and spent a total of twelve weeks on the country chart.

== Charts ==
=== Weekly charts ===
Chart (1983)	Peak position
US Hot Country Songs (Billboard)	1
Canadian RPM Country Tracks	1

=== Year-end charts ===
Chart (1983)	Position
US Hot Country Songs (Billboard)	20
