= Charly McClain =

American retired singer (born 1956)

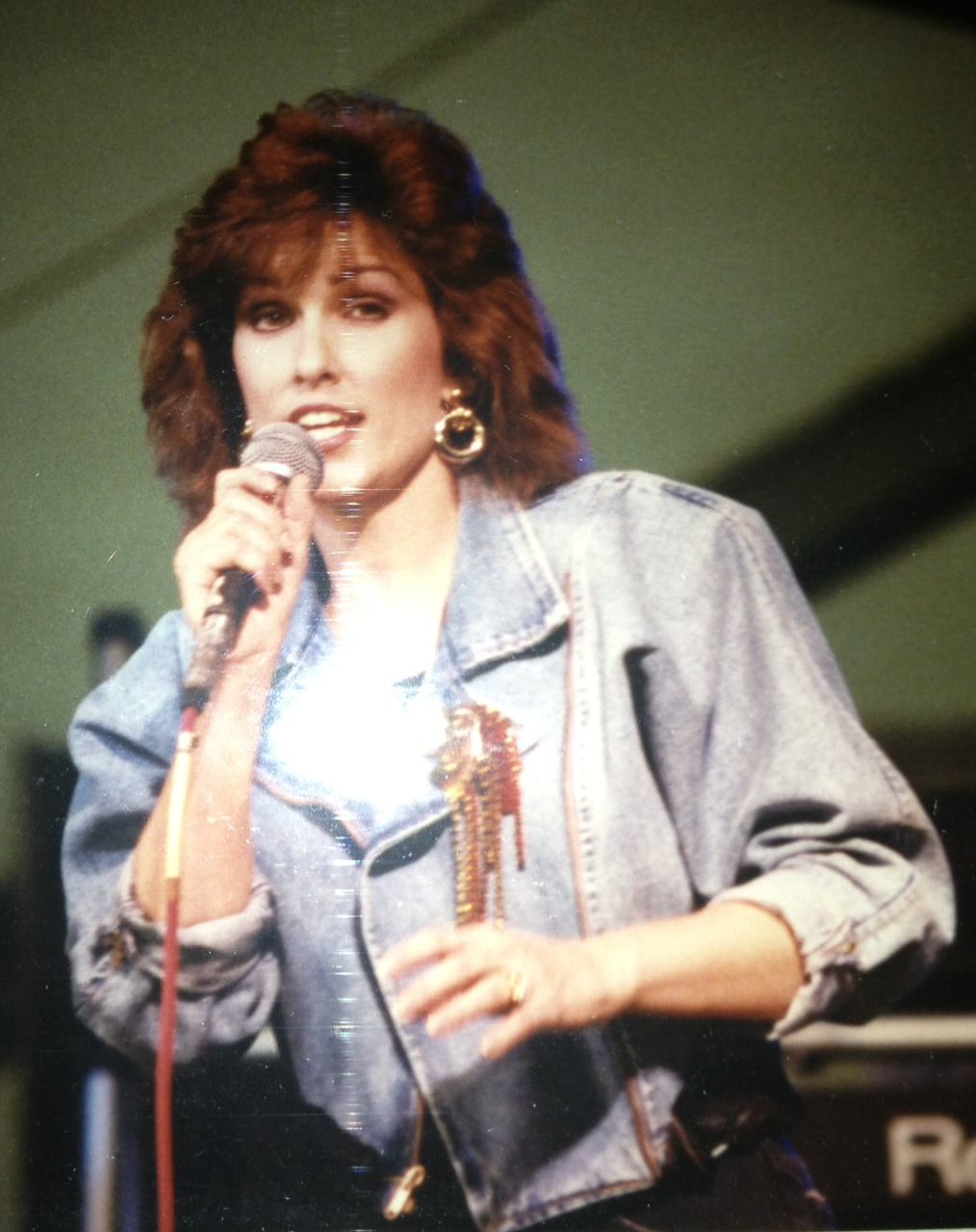
- McClain performing at the 1989 Martin County Fair

Background information
- Born: Charlotte Denise McClain; March 26, 1956 (age 70); Jackson, Tennessee, U.S.
- Genre: Country pop
- Occupation: Singer
- Instrument: Vocals
- Years active: 1976–1991
- Labels: Epic; Mercury
- Spouse: Wayne Massey (m. 1984)

Charlotte Denise "Charly" McClain (born March 26, 1956) is a retired American country music singer, best known for a string of hits during the 1980s. McClain's biggest hits include "Who's Cheatin' Who", "Sleepin' with the Radio On", and "Radio Heart".

== Early life ==
Charlotte Denise "Charly" McClain was born in the city of Jackson, Tennessee on March 26, 1956. She was the second child for Virginia (née Wiggins; 1934–2009) and Niles McClain. The nickname "Charly" would come from the neighborhood friends that she played with as a child. McClain used it when she began her career playing hotel lounges. Her first experience recording was when father Niles had tuberculosis when she was eight. As she was under age to comply with hospital visiting policy, she had to communicate with him through a tape recorder. That inspired her interest in recording. She began her musical career at age 12 performing with her brother Mike and their band, Charlotte & the Volunteers. The band performed together for the next six years.

Her first TV appearance was on the local WBBJ morning show in Jackson, Tennessee. By the age of 17, she was a regular on the club circuit, and appeared at the Memphis show Mid-South Jamboree from 1973–1975.

== Recording career ==
=== Steady rise ===
At the age of 20, McClain signed her first recording contract with Epic Records in 1976. McClain's distinct vocal sound provided an edge in recognizability—as did her attractive appearance. McClain debuted in late 1976 with her first single, "Lay Down," which peaked at No. 67 on the Billboard Country Chart. McClain's initial singles in 1976 and 1977, from her debut album Here's Charly McClain, failed to appear highly on the country chart. McClain's second album, Let Me Be Your Baby, was released in 1978. She hit country's Top Ten for the first time in 1978 with "That's What You Do to Me," followed by two other Top 25 hits, "Let Me Be Your Baby," and "Take Me Back."

In 1979 McClain released Alone Too Long, which included the Top-20 hits "When A Love Ain't Right" and "You're a Part of Me". The Women Get Lonely album followed in 1980, featuring the Top 10 hit "Men", which peaked at No. 7 in 1980, and the Top-20 duet with Johnny Rodriguez, "I Hate the Way I Love It." However, breakthrough success still eluded McClain.

=== Achieving success ===
McClain hit No. 1 on the country chart in 1981 with "Who's Cheatin' Who". In 1981, McClain scored three Top-10 hits off her Surround Me with Love album: the title track, "Sleepin' with the Radio On", and "The Very Best Is You". McClain's albums were beginning to become more successful as well. Her Who's Cheatin' Who album peaked at No. 28 on the Top Country Albums chart, and her 1981 album, Surround Me With Love went to number 9.

Also in 1981, Charly was featured in So You Want To Be A Star? on HBO .

In 1983, McClain hit No. 1 again with her Mickey Gilley duet "Paradise Tonight." McClain's and Gilley's duet partnership became so successful, they released a duet album the following year titled It Takes Believers. The record contained the Top-5 hit, "Candy Man" (No. 5 on the Billboard Country Chart), and the top 20 hit, "The Right Stuff".

McClain also acted; she appeared as a guest star on such shows as Hart to Hart (in 1981 episode titled "Rhinestone Harts") and CHiPs (in 1983 episode "Country Action"). McClain's lonely life on the road was also chronicled in a 1981 HBO special titled So You Want to Be a Star.

After having a series of hit singles in 1984, McClain released another best-selling album, Radio Heart in 1985. The album's title track became a No. 1 Country hit in 1985; McClain's last No. 1 to date. The album also spawned two other Top-10 hits that year. McClain married former soap star Wayne Massey in 1984, and their duet "With Just One Look in Your Eyes" reached number five. The third single off the album was also a duet with Massey. It was titled "You Are My Music, You Are My Song". The Radio Heart album peaked at No. 15 on the Top Country Albums chart in 1985. In 1986, Charly and Wayne released a duet album When Love Is Right and the first single "When It's Down to Me and You" peaked at No. 17.

== Later years ==
After 1986, McClain's success began to subside. Her 1987 Still I Stay album brought only one Top 40 single; "Don't Touch Me There" peaked at No. 20 on the Billboard Country Chart. The album became McClain's last album with Epic. Upon fulfilling her contract, she parted ways with the record label the following year. She continued to chart until her last recording came in 1989. She recorded one studio album with Mercury Records before the end of the decade. Her last charted single was "You Got the Job", which peaked at No. 65. McClain has not recorded a studio album since 1988's self-titled album on Mercury Records.

== Retirement and family ==
Preferring to spend more time with her husband and their families, McClain retired completely from touring, public appearances, and performances in the early 1990s. Later, she helped to care for her mother Virginia before she died in 2009.

McClain and Wayne Massey have no children together. However, Massey does have a son from his first marriage. They continue to reside in the Memphis, Tennessee, area.

== Awards and nominations ==
Year	Organization	Award	Nominee/Work	Result
1979	Academy of Country Music Awards	Top New Female Vocalist	Charly McClain	Nominated
1980	Music City News Country Awards	Most Promising Female Artist	Charly McClain	Won
1984	Academy of Country Music Awards	Top Vocal Duo of the Year	Mickey Gilley and Charly McClain	Nominated
1984	Music City News Country Awards	Vocal Duo of the Year	Mickey Gilley and Charly McClain	Nominated
1984	Music City News Country Awards	Female Artist of the Year	Charly McClain	Nominated
1985	American Music Awards	Favorite Country Female Video Artist	Charly McClain	Nominated
1986	Music City News Country Awards	Female Artist of the Year	Charly McClain	Nominated
1986	Music City News Country Awards	Vocal Duo of the Year	Charly McClain and Wayne Massey	Nominated
