= For the Record (Alabama album) =

1998 album by the American band, Alabama

For the Record: 41 Number One Hits

Greatest hits album by Alabama
- Released: August 25, 1998
- Recorded: 1978–1998
- Genre: Country; country pop; bluegrass; southern rock
- Length: 2:33:04
- Label: RCA Nashville
- Producer: Alabama and Don Cook

Alabama chronology
The Essential Alabama (1998)	For the Record: 41 Number One Hits (1998)	Twentieth Century (1999)

Singles from For the Record: 41 Number One Hits
- 1. "How Do You Fall in Love" Released: August 1, 1998; 2. "Keepin' Up" Released: November 23, 1998

Professional ratings
Review scores
Source	Rating
AllMusic	5/5 stars

For the Record: 41 Number One Hits is a two-disc greatest hits album by the American country pop and southern rock band Alabama, released in 1998.

The track-listing includes all 33 of the band's Billboard magazine Hot Country Singles & Tracks (now Hot Country Songs chart) number-one singles, as well as other songs which reached number-one on the former Radio & Records (now Mediabase) chart; each of the non-Billboard number-one hits made the top-five on that chart. Three previously unreleased tracks are also included: "How Do You Fall in Love" (which reached number-two on the Billboard Hot Country Singles & Tracks chart in late 1998), "Keepin' Up" (which reached the top-20 on the same chart in early 1999) and "Five O'Clock 500" (which remained an album cut as it was not released as a single).

All of the greatest hits are presented in their single/radio-edit forms. In some cases, the songs were nearly two minutes shorter than their original album versions.

== The Essential ==
For the Record was re-released and re-packaged in 2005 as The Essential. Both albums have an identical track lineup. In his review of The Essential, AllMusic reviewer Stephen Thomas Erlewine stated that the new album title eliminated "the misleading subtitle that claimed all of the songs on the album hit No. 1." A disclaimer on the back of the album indicates that The Essential is the newly reissued For the Record.

== Commercial performance ==
For the Record debuted at number two on the Billboard Top Country Albums chart and number 13 on the Billboard 200, opening at 71,000 copies in its first week. This was the group's second highest chart position on the main Billboard 200 charts of their career in fifteen years since their 1983 album The Closer You Get... last peaked at number 10. The compilation stayed inside the country charts for 105 weeks and spent 33 weeks on the main chart. It was certified five-fold platinum for sales of over five million units by the Recording Industry Association of America (RIAA).

== Song listing ==
Disc 1

1. "Five O'Clock 500" (Teddy Gentry, Randy Owen, Ronnie Rogers) – 3:36^{A}
2. "Keepin' Up" (Greg Fowler, Gentry, Owen, Rogers) – 3:05^{A}
3. "How Do You Fall in Love" (Fowler, Gentry, Owen) – 3:00^{A}
4. "Tennessee River" (Owen) – 3:02
5. "Why Lady Why" (Gentry, Rick Scott) – 3:09
6. "Old Flame" (Donny Lowery, Mac McAnally) – 3:10
7. "Feels So Right" (Owen) – 3:35
8. "Love in the First Degree" (Tim DuBois, Jim Hurt) – 3:18
9. "Mountain Music" (Owen) – 3:38
10. "Take Me Down" (Mark Gray, J.P. Pennington) – 3:43
11. "Close Enough to Perfect" (Carl Chambers) – 3:33
12. "Dixieland Delight" (Rogers) – 3:56
13. "The Closer You Get" (Gray, Pennington) – 3:37
14. "Lady Down on Love" (Owen) – 3:57
15. "Roll On (Eighteen Wheeler)" (Dave Loggins) – 3:43
16. "When We Make Love" (Troy Seals, Mentor Williams) – 3:36
17. "If You're Gonna Play in Texas (You Gotta Have a Fiddle in the Band)" (Murry Kellum, Dan Mitchell) – 3:22
18. "(There's A) Fire in the Night" (Bob Corbin) – 3:57
19. "There's No Way" (John Jarrard, Lisa Palas, Will Robinson) – 4:11
20. "40 Hour Week (For a Livin')" (Loggins, Don Schlitz, Lisa Silver) – 3:18
21. "Can't Keep a Good Man Down" (Corbin) – 3:39
22. "She and I" (Loggins) – 3:34

Disc 2

1. "Touch Me When We're Dancing" (Kenneth Bell, Terry Skinner, J.L. Wallace) – 3:41
2. ""You've Got" the Touch" (Jarrard, Palas, Robinson) – 4:15
3. "Face to Face" (Owen) – 3:00
4. "Fallin' Again" (Fowler, Gentry, Owen) – 3:59
5. "Song of the South" (Bob McDill) – 3:11
6. "If I Had You" (Kerry Chater, Danny Mayo) – 3:33
7. "High Cotton" (Scott Anders, Roger Murrah) – 3:00
8. "Southern Star" (Rich Alves, Steve Dean, Murrah) – 3:08
9. "Jukebox in My Mind" (Dave Gibson, Rogers) – 3:39
10. "Forever's as Far as I'll Go" (Mike Reid) – 3:33
11. "Down Home" (Rick Bowles, Josh Leo) – 3:27
12. "Here We Are" (Beth Nielsen Chapman, Vince Gill) – 2:51
13. "Then Again" (Bowles, Jeff Silbar) – 3:43
14. "Born Country" (Byron Hill, John Schweers) – 3:19
15. "I'm in a Hurry (And Don't Know Why)" (Murrah, Randy VanWarmer) – 2:48
16. "Once Upon a Lifetime" (Gary Baker, Frank J. Myers) – 4:13
17. "Hometown Honeymoon" (Leo, Jim Photoglo) – 3:18
18. "Reckless" (Michael Clark, Jeff Stevens) – 3:19
19. "Give Me One More Shot" (Gentry, Owen, Rogers) – 3:29
20. "She Ain't Your Ordinary Girl" (Robert Jason) – 2:53
21. "In Pictures" (Bobby E. Boyd, Joe Doyle) – 3:33
22. "Sad Lookin' Moon" (Fowler, Gentry, Owen) – 3:33
- ^{A} Previously unreleased

== Live DVD ==
A DVD was released with Alabama performing all 41 Number One Hits (plus My Home's In Alabama) at Las Vegas on October 10, 1998, as a promotion to the album. The three new tracks were not performed live.

Track listing

1. "Tennessee River" (Extended)
2. "Why Lady Why" (Single Version)
3. "Old Flame"
4. "Feels So Right"
5. "Love in the First Degree"
6. "Mountain Music" (Extended)
7. "Take Me Down" (Single Version)
8. "Close Enough to Perfect"
9. "Dixieland Delight" (Extended)
10. "The Closer You Get" (Intro, Chorus, Bridge and Outro Only)
11. "Lady Down on Love"
12. "Roll On (Eighteen Wheeler)" (Single Version)
13. "When We Make Love"
14. "If You're Gonna Play in Texas (You Gotta Have a Fiddle in the Band)"
15. "(There's A) Fire in the Night"
16. "There's No Way"
17. "40 Hour Week (For a Livin')" (Extended)
18. "Can't Keep a Good Man Down"
19. "She and I" (Short Version)
20. "Touch Me When We're Dancing"
21. "'You've Got' the Touch"
22. "Face to Face"
23. "Fallin' Again"
24. "Song of the South" (Extended)
25. "If I Had You"
26. "High Cotton"
27. "Southern Star"
28. "Jukebox in My Mind"
29. "Forever's as Far as I'll Go"
30. "Down Home"
31. "Here We Are" (Extended Intro)
32. "Then Again"
33. "Born Country"
34. "I'm in a Hurry (And Don't Know Why)"
35. "Once Upon a Lifetime"
36. "Hometown Honeymoon"
37. "Reckless"
38. "Give Me One More Shot"
39. "She Ain't Your Ordinary Girl"
40. "In Pictures"
41. "Sad Lookin' Moon" (Extended)
42. "My Home's in Alabama" (Extended)

== Personnel on Tracks 1–3 (Disc #1) ==
Alabama

- Randy Owen – lead vocals
- Jeff Cook – background vocals
- Teddy Gentry – bass guitar, background vocals

Alabama's drummer, Mark Herndon, does not play on the new tracks.

Additional Musicians

- Mark Casstevens – acoustic guitar
- Don Cook – background vocals
- Steve Dorff – string arrangements, conductor
- Larry Franklin – fiddle
- John Barlow Jarvis – piano, Hammond B-3 organ
- Brent Mason – electric guitar, 12-string electric guitar, gut string guitar
- Steve Nathan – keyboards
- Lonnie Wilson – drums, percussion

== Charts ==
=== Weekly charts ===
As For the Record

Chart (1998)	Peak position
Canadian Country Albums (RPM)	4
US Billboard 200	13
US Top Country Albums (Billboard)	2

As The Essential

Chart (2005)	Peak position
US Top Country Albums (Billboard)	52

=== Year-end charts ===
As For the Record

Chart (1998)	Position
US Billboard 200	165
US Top Country Albums (Billboard)	22

Chart (1999)	Position
US Billboard 200	176
US Top Country Albums (Billboard)	12

== Certifications ==
Region	Certification	Certified units/sales
United States (RIAA)	5× Platinum	5,000,000^{^}
^{^} Shipments figures based on certification alone.
