= Livin' Lovin' Rockin' Rollin': The 25th Anniversary Collection =

2006 album by the American band, Alabama

Box set by Alabama
- Released: January 31, 2006
- Recorded: 1973 – September 2000
- Genre: Country
- Label: Legacy/Sony BMG
- Producers: Various producers and Alabama

Alabama chronology
The Ultimate Alabama (2004)	Livin' Lovin' Rockin' Rollin': The 25th Anniversary Collection (2006)	Songs of Inspiration (2006)

Professional ratings
Review scores
Source	Rating
Allmusic	4/5 stars

Livin' Lovin' Rockin' Rollin': The 25th Anniversary Collection is a three-disc box set chronicling the career of country music band Alabama. It contains 51 tracks, dating from their earliest days as a recording act in 1973 through September 2000.

The box set was issued to commemorate Alabama's 25 years of national fame, even though their first national hit was released in 1977 and their first major hit came in 1980. During that time, Alabama had sold millions of albums, won countless awards from the Country Music Association and Academy of Country Music, and had had a major influence in both bringing groups and bands into the country music mainstream and in the styles of later successful groups, including Lonestar and Rascal Flatts.

Many of the songs on this collection are of Alabama's biggest hits, including a majority of their 32 No. 1 songs (as determined by Billboard magazine's Hot Country Singles & Tracks chart). However, as Allmusic reviewer Stephen Thomas Erlewine pointed out, The 25th Anniversary Collection was intended "as an aural biography of a band". Several of the hit titles are presented here either as live concert recordings or taken from alternate takes.

In addition to the three compact discs, The 25th Anniversary Collection includes a booklet containing photographs, a biography by Nashville journalist Robert K. Oermann and comments from band members.

== Track listing ==
=== Disc 1 ===
1. "My Home's in Alabama" (Teddy Gentry, Randy Owen) — 8:20^{C}
2. "40 Hour Week (For a Livin')" (Dave Loggins, Don Schlitz, Lisa Silver) — 3:24
3. "Medley: That Silver-Haired Daddy of Mine / Suppertime / Teach Your Children / Don't It Make You Want to Go Home" (Gene Autry, Jimmy Long / Ira Stanphill / Graham Nash / Joe South) — 7:09^{AC}
4. "High Cotton" (Scott Anders, Roger Murrah) — 3:01
5. "Mountain Music" (Owen) — 4:13
6. "Dixieland Delight" (Ronnie Rogers) — 5:18^{C}
7. "Caroline Mountain Dewe" (Owen) — 4:25
8. "Roll On (Eighteen Wheeler)" (Loggins) — 4:26
9. "If You're Gonna Play in Texas (You Gotta Have a Fiddle in the Band)" (Murry Kellum, Dan Mitchell) — 3:42^{C}
10. "Christmas in Dixie" (Jeff Cook, Gentry, Mark Herndon, Owen) — 3:42
11. "I Write a Little" (Cook, Owen, Rogers) — 4:18
12. "Song of the South" (Bob McDill) — 3:11
13. "Pass It On Down" (Gentry, Owen, Will Robinson, Rogers) — 4:54
14. "Five O'Clock 500" (Gentry, Owen, Rogers) — 3:38
15. "Tar Top" (Owen) — 5:23^{AC}
16. "Dancin', Shaggin' on the Boulevard" (Greg Fowler, Gentry, Owen) — 4:43

=== Disc 2 ===
1. "Feels So Right" (Owen) — 3:37
2. "Old Flame" (Donny Lowery, Mac McAnally) — 3:12
3. "Lady Down on Love" (Owen) — 3:58
4. "Very Special Love" (Gentry, Owen) — 4:45
5. "Close Enough to Perfect" (Carl Chambers) — 3:34
6. "Take Me Down" (Mark Gray, J.P. Pennington) — 4:53
7. "Medley: Deep River Woman / When We Make Love" (Lionel Richie / Troy Seals, Mentor Williams) — 4:21^{AC}
8. "Face to Face" (alternate take) (Owen) — 3:03^{A}
9. "'You've Got' the Touch" (John Jarrard, Lisa Palas, Robinson) — 4:16
10. "You Turn Me On" (Gentry, Owen) — 3:10
11. "Forever's as Far as I'll Go" (Mike Reid) — 3:37
12. "How Do You Fall in Love" (Fowler, Gentry, Owen) — 3:00
13. "I Just Couldn't Say No" (Fowler, Gentry, Owen) — 4:35
14. "Too Much Love" (Fowler, Owen) — 3:57
15. "If I Had You" (Chater, Mayo) — 3:35
16. "The Woman He Loves" (Seals, Setser) — 3:55
17. "God Must Have Spent a Little More Time on You" (Rogers, Sturken) — 4:41
18. "Angels Among Us" (Vocal Remix) (Don Goodman, Becky Hobbs) — 4:07

=== Disc 3 ===
1. "Tennessee River" (Owen) — 7:53^{C}
2. "Vacation" (Owen) — 5:19^{AC}
3. "She and I" (Loggins) — 5:17
4. "Sad Lookin' Moon" (Fowler, Gentry, Owen) — 3:33
5. "Give Me One More Shot" (Gentry, Owen, Rogers) — 3:32
6. "Fallin' Again" (Fowler, Gentry, Owen) — 4:00^{B}
7. "I'm in a Hurry (And Don't Know Why)" (Murrah, Randy Van Warmer) — 2:49
8. "Can't Keep a Good Man Down" (Bob Corbin) — 3:45^{C}
9. "If It Ain't Dixie (It Won't Do)" (Jarrard, Robbins) — 6:42^{AC}
10. "The Cheap Seats" (Hummon, Sharp) — 3:54
11. "Gonna Have a Party" (Channel, Cochran, Kane) — 4:59^{AC}
12. "When It All Goes South" (Carnes, Carnes, Jarvis) — 6:57
13. "Down Home" (Bowles, Leo) — 3:29
14. "Born Country" (Byron Hill, John Schweers) — 3:18
15. "Ripperly O' Tucke" (demo) (Owen) — 3:21^{A}
16. "Hats Off" (Fowler, Gentry, Owen, Rogers) — 3:56
17. "The Fans" (Fowler, Gentry, Owen) — 4:53
- ^{A} Previously unreleased.
- ^{B} Single edit.
- ^{C} Live recording.

== Personnel ==
=== Alabama ===
- Jeff Cook- fiddle, electric guitar, vocals
- Teddy Gentry- bass guitar, vocals
- Mark Herndon- drums, percussion
- Randy Owen- lead vocals, background vocals

=== Additional Musicians ===
- Mark Casstevens- acoustic guitar
- Don Cook- background vocals
- Debbie Datz Pyle- string contractor
- Steve Dorff- conductor, string arrangements
- Larry Franklin- fiddle
- John Barlow Jarvis- Hammond B-3 organ, piano
- Brent Mason- 6-string bass guitar, 12-string electric guitar, electric guitar, gut string guitar
- The Music Team- string contractors
- Steve Nathan- keyboards
- Lonnie Wilson- drums, percussion

== Chart performance ==
Chart (2006)	Peak position
U.S. Billboard Top Country Albums	28
U.S. Billboard 200	120
