= The American Farewell Tour =

2003 album by the American band, Alabama

Compilation album by Alabama
- Released: October 7, 2003
- Genre: Country
- Length: 1:12:07
- Label: RCA Nashville

Alabama chronology
In the Mood: The Love Songs (2003)	The American Farewell Tour (2003)	The Ultimate Alabama (2004)

The American Farewell Tour is a compilation album by American country music band Alabama, released in 2003. Although titled The American Farewell Tour, a tour that Alabama undertook in 2003, the album is actually a compilation of songs released by Alabama over the years.

== Commercial performance ==
The album peaked at number 6 on the Billboard Top Country Albums chart. The album has sold 650,800 copies in the United States as of October 2019.

== Track listing ==
No.	Title	Writer(s)	Length
1.	"When It All Goes South"	Rick Carnes, Janis Carnes, John Barlow Jarvis	3:16
2.	"Love in the First Degree"	Tim DuBois, Jim Hurt	3:19
3.	"The Closer You Get"	J.P. Pennington, Mark Gray	3:35
4.	"High Cotton"	Scott Anders, Roger Murrah	3:01
5.	"Sad Lookin' Moon"	Greg Fowler, Teddy Gentry, Randy Owen	3:33
6.	"Feels So Right"	Owen	3:36
7.	"Lady Down on Love"	Owen	3:59
8.	"Down Home"	Rick Bowles, Josh Leo	3:27
9.	"Christmas in Dixie"	Jeff Cook, Gentry, Mark Herndon, Owen	3:34
10.	"Give Me One More Shot"	Gentry, Owen Ronnie Rogers	3:30
11.	"Roll On (Eighteen Wheeler)"	Dave Loggins	3:45
12.	"Song of the South"	Bob McDill	3:11
13.	"The Fans"	Fowler, Gentry, Owen	4:53
14.	"I'm in a Hurry (And Don't Know Why)"	Murrah, Randy VanWarmer	2:49
15.	"Tennessee River"	Owen	3:03
16.	"Old Flame"	Donny Lowery, Mac McAnally	3:12
17.	"Dixieland Delight"	Rogers	3:58
18.	"Dancin', Shaggin' on the Boulevard"	Fowler, Gentry, Owen	4:45
19.	"Mountain Music"	Owen	3:39
20.	"My Home's in Alabama"	Owen, Gentry	4:02

== Charts ==
=== Weekly charts ===
Chart (2003)	Peak position
US Billboard 200	64
US Top Country Albums (Billboard)	6

=== Year-end charts ===
Chart (2004)	Position
US Top Country Albums (Billboard)	67
Chart (2019)	Position
US Top Country Albums (Billboard)	79

== Certifications ==
Region	Certification	Certified units/sales
United States (RIAA)	Gold	500,000^{‡}
^{‡} Sales+streaming figures based on certification alone.
