= The Ultimate Alabama =

2004 album by the American band, Alabama

Ultimate Alabama

Compilation album by Alabama
- Released: October 12, 2004
- Genre: Country
- Length: 59:48
- Label: RCA Nashville

Alabama chronology
The American Farewell Tour (2003)	Ultimate Alabama (2004)	Livin' Lovin' Rockin' Rollin': The 25th Anniversary Collection (2006)

Professional ratings
Review scores
Source	Rating
Allmusic	4/5 stars

Ultimate Alabama: 20 #1 Hits is a compilation album by American country music band Alabama, released in 2004.

The album debuted at No. 52 on the Billboard 200, and No. 10 on Top Country Albums in its first week of release. The album has sold 755,100 copies in the United States as of April 2017.

== Track listing ==
No.	Title	Writer(s)	Length
1.	"Born Country"	Byron Hill, John Schweers	3:17
2.	"Jukebox in My Mind"	Dave Gibson, Ronnie Rogers	3:37
3.	"Reckless"	Michael Clark, Jeff Stevens	3:18
4.	"Feels So Right"	Randy Owen	3:35
5.	"Love in the First Degree"	Tim DuBois, Jim Hurt	3:18
6.	"Mountain Music"	Owen	3:38
7.	"Song of the South"	Bob McDill	3:12
8.	"Tennessee River"	Owen	3:03
9.	"Take Me Down"	Mark Gray, J.P. Pennington	3:43
10.	"Lady Down on Love"	Owen	3:59
11.	"She and I"	Dave Loggins	3:35
12.	"Down Home"	Rick Bowles, Josh Leo	3:27
13.	"Why Lady Why"	Teddy Gentry, Rick Scott	3:10
14.	"I'm in a Hurry (And Don't Know Why)"	Roger Murrah, Randy VanWarmer	2:49
15.	"Roll On (Eighteen Wheeler)"	Loggins	3:46
16.	"You've Got the Touch"	John Jarrard, Lisa Palas, Will Robinson	4:14
17.	"There's No Way"	Jarrard, Palas, Robinson	4:13
18.	"40 Hour Week (For a Livin')"	Loggins, Don Schlitz, Lisa Silver	3:24
19.	"If You're Gonna Play in Texas (You Gotta Have a Fiddle in the Band)"	Murray Kellum, Dan Mitchell	3:23
20.	"Southern Star"	Rich Alves, Steve Dean, Murrah	3:07

== Charts ==
=== Weekly charts ===
Chart (2004)	Peak position
US Billboard 200	52
US Top Country Albums (Billboard)	10

=== Year-end charts ===
Chart (2005)	Position
US Top Country Albums (Billboard)	74
