= Greatest Hits Vol. III (Alabama album) =

1994 album by the American band, Alabama

Greatest hits album by Alabama
- Released: September 27, 1994
- Recorded: 1980 (3), 1984 (4&5), 1985 (7), 1987 (6), 1990 (8&9), 1992 (10), 1993 (11), 1994 (1&2)
- Genre: Country
- Label: RCA Nashville
- Producer: Alabama and Garth Fundis (Tracks 1–2); Various original producers (other tracks)

Alabama chronology
Christmas with The Judds and Alabama (1994)	Greatest Hits Vol. III (1994)	In Pictures (1995)

Singles from Greatest Hits Vol. III
- 1. "We Can't Love Like This Anymore" Released: August 29, 1994; 2. "Give Me One More Shot" Released: February 6, 1995

Professional ratings
Review scores
Source	Rating
AllMusic	4.5/5 stars

Greatest Hits Vol. III is the third greatest hits package released by the American country music band Alabama. The album was released by RCA Records in 1994, and has since been certified double platinum for sales of 2 million units by the Recording Industry Association of America .

Alabama had continued success through the first half of the 1990s, enabling the Fort Payne, Alabama-based band to issue their third album of greatest hits. Included in this 11-track album are eight previous No. 1 hits, including the original single version of "Tennessee River" (an extended live version was included on their first Greatest Hits collection). A holiday/Christian-themed fan favorite, "Angels Among Us", is also included but with a different vocal remix.

Both of the album's new tracks were released as singles: "We Can't Love Like This Anymore" (late 1994) and "Give Me One More Shot" (early 1995). Both songs reached the Top 10 of Billboard magazine's Hot Country Singles & Tracks chart.

== Track listing ==
No.	Title	Writer(s)	Length
1.	"Give Me One More Shot" (Previously unreleased)	Teddy Gentry; Randy Owen; Ronnie Rogers	3:29
2.	"We Can't Love Like This Anymore" (Previously unreleased)	John Jarrard; Wendell Mobley	3:16
3.	"Tennessee River"	Owen	3:02
4.	"When We Make Love"	Troy Seals; Mentor Williams	3:35
5.	"If You're Gonna Play in Texas (You Gotta Have a Fiddle in the Band)"	Murray Kellum; Dan Mitchell	3:43
6.	"There's No Way"	John Jarrard; Lisa Palas; Will Robinson	4:10
7.	"Face to Face (with K. T. Oslin; uncredited)"	Owen	3:00
8.	"Jukebox in My Mind"	Dave Gibson; Ronnie Rogers	3:36
9.	"Forever's as Far as I'll Go"	Mike Reid	3:32
10.	"I'm in a Hurry (And Don't Know Why)"	Roger Murrah; Randy VanWarmer	2:48
11.	"Angels Among Us"	Don Goodman; Becky Hobbs	4:06
Total length:			38:35

== Personnel on Tracks 1 & 2 ==
Alabama

- Jeff Cook – background vocals
- Teddy Gentry – bass guitar, background vocals
- Randy Owen – lead vocals

Alabama's drummer, Mark Herndon, does not play on the new tracks.

Additional musicians

- Dann Huff – electric guitar
- Brent Mason – electric guitar
- Steve Nathan – piano, keyboards
- Don Potter – acoustic guitar
- Milton Sledge – drums
- Biff Watson – acoustic guitar

== Charts ==
=== Weekly charts ===
Chart (1994–1995)	Peak position
US Billboard 200	56
US Top Country Albums (Billboard)	8

=== Year-end charts ===
Chart (1995)	Position
US Billboard 200	126
US Top Country Albums (Billboard)	20
Chart (1996)	Position
US Top Country Albums (Billboard)	51

== Certifications ==
Region	Certification	Certified units/sales
United States (RIAA)	2× Platinum	2,000,000^{^}
^{^} Shipments figures based on certification alone.
