= The Essential Alabama =

1998 album by the American band, Alabama

Greatest hits album by Alabama
- Released: June 2, 1998
- Recorded: 1980–1989
- Genre: Country
- Label: BMG International
- Producer: Various and Alabama

Alabama chronology
Born Country (1997)	The Essential Alabama (1998)	For the Record (1998)

Professional ratings
Review scores
Source	Rating
Allmusic	4.5/5 stars

The Essential Alabama is a compilation album that chronicled the music of the country music band Alabama. Issued as part of BMG International's "The Essential" series, the album was released in June 1998.

As with other albums issued in "The Essential" series, the Alabama volume chronicled the music offered from the peak of the band's phenomenal 1980s success. The liner notes include a biography and detailed information about each of the 16 songs featured on the album.

Unlike their previous "greatest hits" compilations, Alabama's The Essential Alabama was not strictly a greatest-hits package, a point on which some reviewers picked up . As with other volumes in "The Essential" series, the Alabama contained album tracks and songs that had not previously been issued. Four such tracks are present here: "Very Special Love", "As Right Now", "The Fans" and "I Showed Her".

Of the 12 songs that had been released as singles, 10 of those reached No. 1 on the Billboard magazine Hot Country Singles & Tracks charts during the 1980s. The two other singles were 1980's "My Home's in Alabama" (peaked at No. 17, featured here in its radio-edit version) and 1987's "Tar Top" (the song that broke Alabama's string of 21-straight No. 1 singles when it peaked at No. 7 on the Billboard country charts).

== 2005 "The Essential" album ==
"The Essential" title for this Alabama album should not be confused with the band's retitled two-disc, 44-song package originally issued as For the Record. The latter The Essential was from 2005 and is the reissued 1998 album For the Record.

Ironically, For the Record was released just two months after the original "The Essential Alabama" album was issued.

== Track listing ==
1. "Old Flame" (Donna Lowery, Mac McAnally) – 3:10
2. "My Home's in Alabama" (Teddy Gentry, Randy Owen) – 4:02
3. "Close Enough to Perfect" (Chambers) – 3:33
4. "Mountain Music" (Randy Owen) – 4:08
5. "Lady Down on Love" (Randy Owen) – 3:57
6. "(There's A) Fire in the Night" (Corbin) – 4:14
7. "Very Special Love – (Gentry, Owen) – 4:40
8. "Can't Keep a Good Man Down" (Corbin) – 3:39
9. "She and I" (Dave Loggins) – 3:34
10. "As Right Now" (Fowler, Gentry) – 3:02
11. "'You've Got' the Touch" (Jarrard, Palas, Robinson) – 4:15
12. "The Fans" (Fowler, Gentry, Owen) – 4:52
13. "Tar Top" (Randy Owen) – 3:56
14. "I Showed Her" (Aldridge, Fowler, Gentry) – 4:25
15. "High Cotton" (Anders, Murrah) – 3:00
16. "If I Had You" (Chater, Mayo) – 3:33

== Chart performance ==
Chart (1998)	Peak position
U.S. Billboard Top Country Albums	63

== Certifications ==
Region	Certification	Certified units/sales
United States (RIAA)	Gold	500,000^{^}
^{^} Shipments figures based on certification alone.
