= List of awards and nominations received by Alabama =

List of Alabama awards
- Major awards: Wins
Academy of Country Music Awards	15
American Music Awards	18
Billboard Awards	1
Country Music Association Awards	7
Grammy Awards	2
- Totals
Awards won	200 (claimed)

Alabama is an American country, southern rock and bluegrass band formed in Fort Payne, Alabama, in 1969. Alabama's biggest success came in the 1980s, where the band had over 43 number one hits, seven multi-platinum albums and received numerous awards.

Alabama are the most awarded band in the history of country music, with over 200 awards from a variety of organizations. In 1981, Alabama won both the Vocal Group of the Year and Instrumental Group of the Year honors from the Country Music Association (CMA). It also won the Academy of Country Music (ACM)'s Vocal Group of the Year award, and Billboard's New Group of the Year honors. The group won the CMA's prestigious Entertainer of the Year award for three consecutive years (1982–84), and the ACM's Entertainer of the Year award five times (1982–86). In 1989, Alabama was named Artist of the Decade by the ACM. In addition, Alabama has also received the NARM Gift of Music award, the Alabama Hall of Fame Distinguished Service award, the Country Radio Broadcasters Humanitarian Award, the Prince Matchabelli National Hero Award, the Bob Hope Humanitarian Award, and a star on the Hollywood Walk of Fame.

== Award shows ==
=== Academy of Country Music Awards ===
The Academy of Country Music Awards were first held in 1966, and was the first country music awards program held by a major organization. Alabama has received 15 awards out of 49 nominations.

Year	Nominee / work	Award	Result
1981	Alabama	Vocal Group of the Year	Won
1982	Alabama	Vocal Group of the Year	Won
1982	Alabama	Entertainer of the Year	Won
1982	Feels So Right	Album of the Year	Won
1983	Mountain Music	Album of the Year	Nominated
1983	Alabama	Band of the Year (Touring)	Nominated
1983	Alabama	Entertainer of the Year	Won
1983	Alabama	Vocal Group of the Year	Won
1984	Alabama	Vocal Group of the Year	Won
1984	Entertainer of the Year		Won
1984	The Closer You Get...	Album of the Year	Won
1985	Roll On	Album of the Year	Won
1985	Alabama	Entertainer of the Year	Won
1985	Alabama	Vocal Group of the Year	Won
1985	Alabama	Band of the Year (Touring)	Nominated
1985	"When We Make Love"	Single Record of the Year	Nominated
1986	"40-Hour Week"	Video of the Year	Nominated
1986	40-Hour Week	Album of the Year	Nominated
1986	Alabama	Vocal Group of the Year	Won
1986	Alabama	Entertainer of the Year	Won
1987	Alabama	Entertainer of the Year	Nominated
1987	Alabama	Vocal Group of the Year	Nominated
1987	Alabama	Band of the Year (Touring)	Nominated
1987	"Touch Me When We're Dancing"	Single Record of the Year	Nominated
1988	"Tar Top"	Video of the Year	Nominated
1988	Alabama	Entertainer of the Year	Nominated
1988	Alabama	Vocal Group of the Year	Nominated
1989	Alabama	Vocal Group of the Year	Nominated
1989	Alabama	Entertainer of the Year	Nominated
1990	Alabama	Entertainer of the Year	Nominated
1990	Alabama	Vocal Group of the Year	Nominated
1990	Alabama	Artist of the Decade (1980s)	Won
1990	"High Cotton"	Video of the Year	Nominated
1991	"Pass It on Down"	Video of the Year	Nominated
1991	"Jukebox in My Mind"	Single Record of the Year	Nominated
1991	Pass It on Down	Album of the Year	Nominated
1991	Alabama	Vocal Group of the Year	Nominated
1992	Alabama	Vocal Group of the Year	Nominated
1993	Alabama	Vocal Group of the Year	Nominated
1995	Alabama	Vocal Group of the Year	Nominated
1995	Alabama	Entertainer of the Year	Nominated
1996	Alabama	Top Vocal Group	Nominated
1998	Alabama	Vocal Duo or Group of the Year	Nominated
1999	Alabama	Vocal Duo or Group of the Year	Nominated
2000	"(God Must Have Spent) A Little More Time on You" (shared with 'N Sync)	Vocal Event of the Year	Nominated
2001	Alabama	Vocal Group of the Year	Nominated
2003	Alabama	Pioneer Award	Won
2004	Alabama	Top Vocal Group	Nominated
2005	Alabama	40th Anniversary Award of Merit	Won
2014	Alabama	Career Achievement Award	Won

=== American Music Awards ===
The American Music Awards is an annual awards ceremony created by Dick Clark in 1973. Alabama received their first award in 1984, collecting 18 American Music Awards in total out of 30 nominations. In 2003, Alabama received the academy's prestigious Award of Merit.

Year	Nominee / work	Award	Result
1982	Alabama	Favorite Country Band/Duo/Group	Nominated
1982	"Feels So Right"	Favorite Country Single	Nominated
1982	Feels So Right	Favorite Country Album	Nominated
1983	Mountain Music	Favorite Country Album	Nominated
1983	Alabama	Favorite Country Band/Duo/Group	Won
1984	Alabama	Favorite Country Band/Duo/Group	Won
1984	The Closer You Get...	Favorite Country Album	Won
1984	"Dixieland Delight"	Favorite Country Video	Won
1984	"Dixieland Delight"	Favorite Country Single	Nominated
1985	Roll On	Favorite Country Album	Nominated
1985	Alabama	Favorite Country Band/Duo/Group	Won
1986	Alabama	Favorite Country Band/Duo/Group	Won
1986	40-Hour Week	Favorite Country Album	Won
1986	"40 Hour Week"	Favorite Country Video	Nominated
1986	"There's No Way"	Favorite Country Single	Nominated
1986	Alabama	Favorite Country Band/Duo/Group Video Artist	Nominated
1987	Alabama	Favorite Country Band/Duo/Group Video Artist	Won
1987	Alabama	Favorite Country Band/Duo/Group	Won
1987	Greatest Hits	Favorite Country Album	Won
1988	Alabama	Favorite Country Band/Duo/Group	Won
1989	Alabama	Favorite Country Band/Duo/Group	Won
1989	"Fallin' Again"	Favorite Country Single	Nominated
1990	"If I Had You"	Favorite Country Single	Nominated
1990	Alabama	Favorite Country Band/Duo/Group	Won
1991	Alabama	Favorite Country Band/Duo/Group	Won
1992	Alabama	Favorite Country Band/Duo/Group	Won
1993	Alabama	Favorite Country Band/Duo/Group	Won
1994	Alabama	Favorite Country Band/Duo/Group	Won
1995	Alabama	Favorite Country Band/Duo/Group	Won
1996	Alabama	Favorite Country Band/Duo/Group	Won
1998	Alabama	Favorite Country Band/Duo/Group	Won
1999	Alabama	Favorite Country Band/Duo/Group	Won
2003 (January)	Alabama	Award of Merit	Won

=== American Country Awards ===
The American Country Awards is an annual country music awards show, entirely voted on by fans online. Created in 2010 by the Fox Network, the awards honor country music artists for singles, albums, music videos and touring categories. Alabama has received the Hitmaker Award, and has had one previous nomination.

Year	Nominee / work	Award	Result
2011	"Old Alabama" (shared with Brad Paisley)	Single of the Year: Vocal Collaboration	Nominated
2012	Alabama	Hitmaker Award	Won

=== Billboard Awards ===
The Billboard Music Awards, sponsored by Billboard magazine, was one of several annual United States music awards shows (among the others are the Grammy Awards, the American Music Awards and the Rock and Roll Hall of Fame Induction Ceremony). Alabama has received one award.

Year	Nominee / work	Award	Result
1990	Alabama	Country Group or Duo	Won

=== BMI Awards ===
Broadcast Music, Inc. (BMI) is one of three United States performing rights organizations, along with ASCAP and SESAC. It collects license fees on behalf of songwriters, composers, and music publishers and distributes them as royalties to those members whose works have been performed. At the BMI Awards, Alabama has collected two awards.

Year	Nominee / work	Award	Result
1989	"Fallin' Again"	Song of the Year	Won
2000	Alabama	President's Award	Won

=== Cammy Awards ===
The Cammy Awards is an award ceremony promoting Carolina beach music, its influences and offshoots. Alabama has received one award.

Year	Nominee / work	Award	Result
1998	"Dancin' Shaggin' on the Boulevard"	Beach Music Song of the Year	Won

=== Country Music Association Awards ===
The Country Music Association Awards, also known as the CMA Awards or CMAs, are presented to country music artists and broadcasters according to voting by CMA members. Alabama has received seven awards out of 40 nominations.

Year	Nominee / work	Award	Result
1980	Alabama	Vocal Group of the Year	Nominated
1980	Alabama	Instrumental Group of the Year	Nominated
1981	Alabama	Instrumental Group of the Year	Won
1981	Alabama	Vocal Group of the Year	Won
1981	Alabama	Entertainer of the Year	Nominated
1981	Feels So Right	Album of the Year	Nominated
1981	"Old Flame"	Single of the Year	Nominated
1982	"Love in the First Degree"	Single of the Year	Nominated
1982	Mountain Music	Album of the Year	Nominated
1982	Alabama	Instrumental Group of the Year	Won
1982	Alabama	Vocal Group of the Year	Won
1982	Alabama	Entertainer of the Year	Won
1983	Alabama	Entertainer of the Year	Won
1983	The Closer You Get...	Album of the Year	Won
1983	Alabama	Instrumental Group of the Year	Nominated
1983	Alabama	Vocal Group of the Year	Nominated
1984	Alabama	Vocal Group of the Year	Nominated
1984	Alabama	Instrumental Group of the Year	Nominated
1984	Roll On	Album of the Year	Nominated
1984	Alabama	Entertainer of the Year	Won
1985	Alabama	Entertainer of the Year	Nominated
1985	Alabama	Instrumental Group of the Year	Nominated
1985	Alabama	Vocal Group of the Year	Nominated
1985	40-Hour Week	Album of the Year	Nominated
1987	Alabama	Vocal Group of the Year	Nominated
1988	Alabama	Vocal Group of the Year	Nominated
1989	Alabama	Vocal Group of the Year	Nominated
1991	Alabama	Vocal Group of the Year	Nominated
1992	Alabama	Vocal Group of the Year	Nominated
1993	Alabama	Vocal Group of the Year	Nominated
1994	Alabama	Vocal Group of the Year	Nominated
1996	Alabama	Vocal Group of the Year	Nominated
1997	Alabama	Vocal Group of the Year	Nominated
1998	Alabama	Vocal Group of the Year	Nominated
1999	Alabama	Vocal Group of the Year	Nominated
2000	Alabama	Vocal Group of the Year	Nominated
2001	Alabama	Vocal Group of the Year	Nominated
2003	Alabama	Vocal Group of the Year	Nominated
2011	"Old Alabama" (shared with Brad Paisley)	Musical Event of the Year	Nominated

=== GMA Dove Awards ===
A Dove Award is an accolade by the Gospel Music Association (GMA) of the United States to recognize outstanding achievement in the Christian music industry. The awards are presented at an annual ceremony called the GMA Dove Awards. Alabama received two nominations.

Year	Nominee / work	Award	Result
2007	Songs of Inspiration	Country Album of the Year	Nominated
2008	Songs of Inspiration II	Country Album of the Year	Nominated

=== Grammy Awards ===
The Grammy Awards (originally called the Gramophone Awards) — or Grammys — are presented annually by the National Academy of Recording Arts and Sciences of the United States for outstanding achievements in the music industry. The awards ceremony features performances by prominent artists, and some of the awards of more popular interest are presented in a widely viewed televised ceremony. Since 1982, Alabama has won a total of two Grammy Awards from 13 nominations throughout their career.

Year	Nominee / work	Award	Result
1982	"Feels So Right"	Best Country Performance by a Duo or Group with Vocal	Nominated
1983	"Mountain Music"	Best Country Performance by a Duo or Group with Vocal	Won
1984	"The Closer You Get"	Best Country Performance by a Duo or Group with Vocal	Won
1985	"If You're Gonna Play in Texas (You Gotta Have a Fiddle in the Band)"	Best Country Performance by a Duo or Group with Vocal	Nominated
1986	"Can't Keep a Good Man Down"	Best Country Performance by a Duo or Group with Vocal	Nominated
1987	"She and I"	Best Country Performance by a Duo or Group with Vocal	Nominated
1991	"Jukebox in My Mind"	Best Country Performance by a Duo or Group with Vocal	Nominated
1992	"Forever's as Far as I'll Go"	Best Country Performance by a Duo or Group with Vocal	Nominated
1993	"American Pride"	Best Country Performance by a Duo or Group with Vocal	Nominated
1998	"Dancin', Shaggin' on the Boulevard"	Best Country Performance by a Duo or Group with Vocal	Nominated
1999	"How Do You Fall In Love"	Best Country Performance by a Duo or Group with Vocal	Nominated
2000	"(God Must Have Spent) A Little More Time on You" (shared with 'N Sync)	Best Country Collaboration with Vocals	Nominated
2001	"Twentieth Century"	Best Country Performance by a Duo or Group with Vocal	Nominated

=== NARM Awards ===
The National Association of Recording Merchandisers is a United States not-for-profit trade association that serves music retailing businesses in lobbying and trade promotion. Alabama won six awards from the organization.

Year	Nominee / work	Award	Result
1981	Feels So Right	Best-Selling Album	Won
1982	Mountain Music	Best-Selling Album	Won
1983	The Closer You Get...	Best-Selling Album	Won
1984	Roll On	Best-Selling Album	Won
1985	40-Hour Week	Best-Selling Album	Won
???	Alabama	Gift of Music Award	Won

=== National Association Of Record Merchandisers Gift Of Music Awards ===
The National Association Of Record Merchandisers Gift Of Music Awards, now known as the Music Business Association, is a United States not-for-profit trade association based in Marlton, New Jersey that seeks to advance and promote music commerce, whether physical, digital, mobile, or more. Alabama has received five awards.

Year	Nominee / work	Award	Result
1981	Feels So Right	Best Selling Country Album by Group	Won
1983	The Closer You Get...	Best Selling Country Album by Group	Won
1984	Roll On	Best Selling Country Album by Group	Won
1985	40-Hour Week	Best Selling Country Album by Group	Won
1986	Greatest Hits	Best Selling Country Album by Group	Won

=== People's Choice Awards ===
The People's Choice Awards is an awards show recognizing the people and the work of popular culture. The show has been held annually since 1975 and is claimed to be based on the opinions of the general public. Alabama received two awards out of three nomination.

Year	Nominee / work	Award	Result
1987	Alabama	Favorite Musical Group	Won
1993	Alabama	Favorite Musical Group	Won
2004	Alabama	Favorite Musical Group or Band	Nominated

=== TNN Awards ===
The TNN Awards were annual award ceremony honoring country music presented by The Nashville Network. Alabama received one award.

Year	Nominee / work	Award	Result
2000	Alabama	Minnie Pearl Humanitarian Award	Won

== Additional awards and honors ==
=== Academy of Television Arts and Sciences ===
Year	Nominee / work	Award	Result
1987	Alabama	Bob Hope Humanitarian Award For Public Service Work and Contributions Involving Children	Won

=== Ampex ===
Year	Nominee / work	Award	Result
1987	The Touch	Golden Reel Award	Won
1988	Just Us	Golden Reel Award	Won

=== Amusement & Music Operators of America ===
Year	Nominee / work	Award	Result
1982	Alabama	Most Popular Artist Of The Year	Won

=== Auburn University ===
Year	Nominee / work	Award	Result
2003	Alabama	International Quality of Life Award	Won

=== BMG ===
Year	Nominee / work	Award	Result
1989	Alabama	Global Achievement Award	Won

=== Country Radio Broadcasters ===
Year	Nominee / work	Award	Result
1990	Alabama	Humanitarian Award	Won
2004	Alabama	Career Achievement Award	Won

=== Entertainment Radio Network ===
Year	Nominee / work	Award	Result
1998	Alabama	Best Group or Duo	Won

=== Hollywood Walk of Fame ===
The Hollywood Walk of Fame is a sidewalk along Hollywood Boulevard and Vine Street in Hollywood, California, USA, that serves as an entertainment hall of fame. It is embedded with more than 2,000 five-pointed stars featuring the names of celebrities honored by the Hollywood Chamber of Commerce for their contributions to the entertainment industry.

Year	Nominee / work	Award	Result
1998	Alabama	Hollywood Walk of Fame Star	Won

=== Nashville Association of Talent Directors ===
Year	Nominee / work	Award	Result
2011	Alabama	NATD Honoree	Won

=== National Association For Campus Activities ===
Year	Nominee / work	Award	Result
1987	Alabama	Favorite Country Music Performer	Won
1988	Alabama	Vocal Group Of The Year	Won

=== Prince Matchabelli National Hero Award ===
Year	Nominee / work	Award	Result
1990	Alabama	Music	Won

=== Recording Industry Association of America ===
Year	Nominee / work	Award	Result
1999	Alabama	Country Group of the Century	Won

=== State of Alabama ===
Year	Nominee / work	Award	Result
2003	Alabama	Spirit of Alabama Medal	Won

=== United Service Organizations ===
Year	Nominee / work	Award	Result
2003	Alabama	USO Rising Star Award	Won
2004	Alabama	Washington Merit Award	Won

== Inductions ==
=== Alabama Music Hall Of Fame ===
Year	Nominee / work	Award	Result
1988	Alabama	Distinguished Service Award	Won
1990	Alabama	Service Award	Won
1993	Alabama	Life Work Award For Performing Achievement	Won

=== Country Music Hall of Fame and Museum ===
Year	Nominee / work	Award	Result
2005	Alabama	Induction	Won

=== Vocal Group Hall of Fame ===
Year	Nominee / work	Award	Result
2004	Alabama	Induction	Won

Musicians Hall of Fame lifetime achievement award 2019

== Magazine awards ==
=== Billboard ===
The Billboard Music Awards, sponsored by Billboard magazine, was one of several annual United States music awards shows (among the others are the Grammy Awards, the American Music Awards and the Rock and Roll Hall of Fame Induction Ceremony).

Year	Nominee / work	Award	Result
1981	Alabama	New Group of the Year	Won
1982	Alabama	Group Of The Year	Won
1982	Alabama	Top Singles Group	Won
1982	Alabama	Top Album Artist	Won
1982	Alabama	Top Group Of The Year - Album and Singles	Won
1982	Alabama	Top Artists Of The Year - Album and Singles	Won
1982	Feels So Right	Top Album	Won
1983	Mountain Music	Top Album	Won
1983	Alabama	Overall Top Artist	Won
1983	Alabama	Overall Top Group	Won
1983	Alabama	Top Album Artist	Won
1983	Alabama	Top Album Group	Won
1984	Alabama	Overall Top Country Artist - Albums and Singles	Won
1984	Alabama	Overall Top Country Group - Albums and Singles	Won
1984	Alabama	Top Album Group	Won
1984	Alabama	Top Album Artist	Won
1984	Alabama	Top Singles Group	Won
1984	Alabama	Bill Williams Artist Of The Year	Won
1985	Alabama	Top Artist for Singles and Albums	Won
1985	Alabama	Top Group for Singles and Albums	Won
1985	Alabama	Top Singles Artist	Won
1985	Alabama	Top Group for Singles	Won
1985	Alabama	Top Group for Albums	Won
1986	Alabama	Top Overall Vocal Group - Singles and Albums	Won
1986	Alabama	Top Overall Album Artist	Won
1986	Alabama	Top Overall Album Group	Won
1989	Alabama	Country Artist of the '80's	Won

=== Cashbox ===
Year	Nominee / work	Award	Result
1980	Alabama	New Vocal Group Of The Year - Singles	Won
1980	Alabama	New Vocal Group Of The Year - Albums	Won
1981	Alabama	Top Vocal Group Of The Year - Albums	Won
1981	Alabama	Top Vocal Group Of The Year - Singles	Won
1981	Alabama	Top Group - Singles	Won
1982	Alabama	Top Vocal Group Of The Year - Singles	Won
1982	Alabama	Top Group Of The Year - Albums	Won
1982	Alabama	Male Entertainer of The Year	Won
1983	Alabama	Single of the Year	Won
1983	Alabama	Group Of The Year	Won
1983	Alabama	Vocal Group Of The Year - Singles	Won
1983	Alabama	Top Vocal Group Of The Year - Albums	Won
1984	Alabama	Singles Award - Vocal Group	Won
1984	Alabama	Album Award - Vocal Group	Won
1984	Roll On	Top 50 Country Albums	Won
1985	40-Hour Week	#1 Album	Won
1985	Alabama	#1 Group	Won
1986	Alabama	Entertainer Of The Year	Won
1986	Alabama	Album - Group Of The Year	Won
1987	Alabama	Country Vocal Group Of The Year	Won
1989	Alabama	Entertainer Of The Year	Won
1989	Alabama	Artist Of The Decade	Won

=== Cashbox Programmers Choice Awards ===
Year	Nominee / work	Award	Result
1982	Alabama	Vocal Group of the Year	Won
1982	Mountain Music	Album Of The Year	Won
1983	The Closer You Get...	Album Of The Year	Won
1983	Alabama	Group Of The Year	Won
1985	Alabama	Programmers Choice Award	Won

=== Country Weekly ===
Year	Nominee / work	Award	Result
2003	Alabama	Fan Favorite Award	Won
2003	Alabama	Favorite Group	Won

=== Music City News Awards ===
Beginning in 1967, the Music City News Awards were presented yearly by the now-defunct Music City News magazine. Today, it is known as the CMT Music Awards.

Year	Nominee / work	Award	Result
1982	Feels So Right	Album of the Year	Won
1982	Alabama	Band of the Year	Won
1983	Alabama	Band of the Year	Won
1983	Alabama	Vocal Group of the Year	Won
1984	Alabama	Band of the Year	Won
1984	The Closer You Get...	Album of the Year	Won

=== Playboy ===
Year	Nominee / work	Award	Result
1990	Southern Star	Country Album Of The Year	Won
1990	Alabama	Top Group/Country Award	Won
1993	Alabama	Top Country Group	Won

=== Radio & Records ===
Year	Nominee / work	Award	Result
1981	Alabama	Group Of The Year	Won
1981	Feels So Right	Album of the Year	Won
1982	Mountain Music	Album of the Year	Won
1982	Alabama	Group Of The Year	Won
1982	Alabama	Performers Of The Year	Won
1983	Alabama	Performers Of The Year	Won
1983	The Closer You Get...	Album of the Year	Won
1984	Roll On	Album of the Year	Won
1984	Alabama	Performers Of The Year	Won
1985	Alabama	Performers Of The Year	Won
1985	Alabama	Performers of the Year (readers' poll)	Won
1985	Alabama	Group Of The Year	Won
1985	Alabama	Best Group	Won
1985	40-Hour Week	Best Album (readers' poll)	Won
1985	40-Hour Week	Album of the Year	Won

=== Us Weekly ===
Year	Nominee / work	Award	Result
1982	Alabama	Favorite Country Group	Won
1983	Alabama	Favorite Country Group	Won
