= 26th Academy of Country Music Awards =

US music awards ceremony in 1991

- Date: April 24, 1991
- Location: Universal Amphitheatre, Los Angeles, California
- Hosted by: Kathy Mattea; Clint Black; George Strait

Highlights
- Most wins: Garth Brooks (6)
- Most nominations: Garth Brooks (7)

Television/radio coverage
- Network: NBC

The 26th Academy of Country Music Awards ceremony was held on April 24, 1991, at the Universal Amphitheatre, in Los Angeles, California. It was hosted by Clint Black, Kathy Mattea, and George Strait.

== Winners and nominees ==
Winners are shown in bold.

Entertainer of the Year	Album of the Year
**Garth Brooks**; Clint Black; Reba McEntire; Dolly Parton; George Strait	**No Fences — Garth Brooks**; Here in the Real World — Alan Jackson; Pass It On Down — Alabama; RVS III — Ricky Van Shelton; When I Call Your Name — Vince Gill
Top Female Vocalist of the Year	Top Male Vocalist of the Year
**Reba McEntire**; Mary Chapin Carpenter; Patty Loveless; Kathy Mattea; Tanya Tucker	**Garth Brooks**; Clint Black; Vince Gill; Ricky Van Shelton; George Strait
Top Vocal Group of the Year	Top Vocal Duo of the Year
**Shenandoah**; Alabama; The Desert Rose Band; The Kentucky Headhunters; Restless Heart	**The Judds**; Baillie & the Boys; Vince Gill and Reba McEntire; Sweethearts of the Rodeo; Tanya Tucker and T. Graham Brown
Single Record of the Year	Song of the Year
**"Friends in Low Places"** — **Garth Brooks**; "Here in the Real World" — Alan Jackson; "Jukebox in My Mind" — Alabama; "Next to You, Next to Me" — Shenandoah; "When I Call Your Name" — Vince Gill	"**The Dance**" — **Tony Arata**; "Friends in Low Places" — Dewayne Blackwell, Earl Bud Lee; "Here in the Real World" — Alan Jackson, Mark Irwin; "Jukebox in My Mind" — Dave Gibson, Ronnie Rogers; "When I Call Your Name" — Vince Gill, Tim DuBois
Top New Male Vocalist	Top New Female Vocalist
**Alan Jackson**; Doug Stone; Travis Tritt	**Shelby Lynne**; Matraca Berg; Carlene Carter
Top New Vocal Duo or Group	Video of the Year
**Pirates of the Mississippi**; Canyon; Prairie Oyster	**"The Dance"** — **Garth Brooks**; "Come Next Monday" — K.T. Oslin; "Here I Am" — Lyle Lovett; "Love Can Build a Bridge" — The Judds; "Pass It On Down" — Alabama
Pioneer Award
**Johnny Cash**

== Performers ==
Performer(s)	Song(s)
Garth Brooks	Medley "Two of a Kind, Workin' on a Full House" "Unanswered Prayers" "Friends in Low Places" "The Dance"
Alan Jackson; Pirates of the Mississippi	New Artist Medley #1 "Don't Rock the Jukebox" "Feed Jake"
The Kentucky Headhunters	"Ballad Of Davy Crockett"
Shelby Lynne; Travis Tritt	New Artist Medley #2 "What About the Love We Made" "Here's A Quarter (Call Someone Who Cares)"
George Strait	"If I Know Me"
Matraca Berg; Canyon	New Artist Medley #3 "Baby, Walk On" "Dam These Tears"
Reba McEntire; Joint Service Color Guard	"America the Beautiful"
Clint Black	"One More Payment"
Carlene Carter; Doug Stone; Prairie Oyster	New Artist Medley #4 "I Fell in Love" "In a Different Light" "I Don't Hurt Anymore"
Kathy Mattea	"Time Passes By"
The Judds; International Children's Choir	"Love Can Build a Bridge"

== Presenters ==
Presenter(s)	Notes
Ricky Van Shelton; Michele Greene	Top Vocal Duo of the Year
Marie Osmond; Restless Heart	Video of the Year
Buck Owens; Lisa Hartman Black	Single Record of the Year
Vince Gill; Ronnie Milsap	Top Female Vocalist of the Year
Robert Duvall	Presented Pioneer Award to Johnny Cash
Lee Horsley; Patty Loveless	Song of the Year
Alan Autry; Valerie Harper	Album of the Year
Mary Chapin Carpenter; Moe Bandy; Juice Newton	Top New Female Vocalist; Top New Vocal Group or Duo; Top New Male Vocalist
Lorianne Crook; Charlie Chase; Steve Gatlin	Top Male Vocalist of the Year
Nancy Stafford; T. Graham Brown	Top Vocal Group of the Year
Alabama	Entertainer of the Year
