= Pass It On Down =

Pass It On Down may refer to:

- Pass It On Down (Alabama album), 1990
  - "Pass It On Down" (song), a song recorded by the country music group Alabama
- Pass It On Down (The Elders album), 2005
