= I Wanna Come Over =

Single by Alabama

from the album My Home's in Alabama
- B-side: "Get It While It's Hot"
- Released: September 29, 1979 (U.S.)
- Recorded: 1979
- Genre: Country
- Length: 3:52
- Label: SLI 7906 (Originally); MDJ 7976 (later); RCA Nashville (later)
- Songwriter(s): Richard Berardi and Michael Berardi
- Producer(s): Sonny Limbo

Alabama singles chronology
"I Wanna Be with You Tonight" (1977)	"I Wanna Come Over" (1979)	"My Home's in Alabama" (1980)

"I Wanna Come Over" is a song written by Richard Berardi and Michael Berardi, and performed by American country music band Alabama. It was first recorded by pop and rock singer Ronnie Spector in 1978 as the B-side of her cover of the Bonnie Tyler song "It's a Heartache". It was released in September 1979 as the first single to feature drummer Mark Herndon from the album My Home's in Alabama.

The song represented a number of milestones in the career of the Fort Payne, Alabama-based band. In 1979, Alabama had started to record again after a two-year hiatus (due to a number of legal restrictions with their first recording contract, the now-defunct GRT Records). One of their first recordings following the hiatus was "I Wanna Come Over," which they included on a self-produced album.

When released in September 1979, the song was issued on the small MDJ Records. The song entered the Billboard magazine Hot Country Singles chart later that month, eventually becoming their first Top 40 hit. The song peaked at No. 33 in early December.

"I Wanna Come Over" also proved crucial for introducing Alabama's fans to one aspect core to their style — the mellow love ballad, which would be repeated on their most successful songs, including "Feels So Right," "There's No Way" and "Forever's as Far as I'll Go." The song also paved the way for the bigger success of the follow-up single, "My Home's in Alabama" (which provided fans with the country rock-influenced side of the band's sound), the group earning an invitation to the "New Faces" show at the annual Country Radio Seminar in Nashville, Tennessee, and an eventual contract with RCA Records.

Both "I Wanna Come Over" and "My Home's in Alabama" are included on Alabama's first RCA Records album, My Home's in Alabama, released in May 1980. "I Wanna Come Over" later served as the B-side to a later Alabama single, "Why Lady Why" (itself originally a B-side hit).

== Chart performance ==
Chart (1979)	Peak position
US Hot Country Songs (Billboard)	33

== Sources ==
- Millard, Bob, "Country Music: 70 Years of America's Favorite Music," HarperCollins, New York, 1993 (ISBN 0-06-273244-7)
- Whitburn, Joel, "Top Country Songs: 1944-2005," 2006.
