= List of Jacksonville State University people =

The following is a list of notable people associated with Jacksonville State University, located in the American city of Jacksonville, Alabama.

== Politics ==
- Ademola Adeleke - former Nigerian Senator and current Governor of Osun State in Nigeria
- Jim Folsom Jr. - former governor and lieutenant governor from Alabama
- Harlan Mathews - former Democratic U.S. Senator from Tennessee
- Elvin McCary - Republican politician from Anniston
- Hugh D. Merrill - former member of the Alabama House of Representatives
- Mike D. Rogers - Republican U.S. Representative from Alabama's 3rd congressional district

== Educators ==
- Letitia Dowdell Ross (1866-1952), American educator who taught at State Normal College (now Jacksonville State University), Martin Female College (Pulaski, Tennessee), and North Texas Female College (Sherman, Texas)

== Science and technology ==
- JoAnn H. Morgan - aerospace engineer, first female engineer at NASA John F. Kennedy Space Center

== Religion ==
- F. Richard Spencer - Roman Catholic bishop
- Dr. Ronnie Reid - Worship Pastor

== Writers ==
- Rick Bragg - Pulitzer Prize–winning writer. Author of Ava's Man and All Over but the Shoutin.
- James Joyner - Well-known blogger and political scientist.
- Robert Stacy McCain - author of Donkey Cons and assistant national editor of the Washington Times.

== Athletics ==
- Rudy Abbott - Legendary baseball coach with over 1,000 career wins, Member of Alabama Sports Hall of Fame
- Mohamed Abu Arisha (born 1997) - Israeli basketball player for Hapoel Be'er Sheva of the Israeli Basketball Premier League and the Israeli national basketball team
- Jesse Baker - former National Football League player with the Houston Oilers.
- Dieter Brock - former National Football League player and Canadian Football League MVP quarterback, member of the Canadian Football Hall of Fame
- Amy Crawford - former WCW Entertainer
- Christian Cunningham (born 1997) - basketball player in the Israeli Basketball Premier League
- Todd Cunningham - professional Major League Baseball outfielder in the Los Angeles Angels of Anaheim organization
- Eric Davis - NFL defensive back San Francisco 49ers, Carolina Panthers and Detroit Lions
- Donovan Hand - MLB pitcher, Milwaukee Brewers
- Walt Harris (fighter) - former basketball player, current mixed martial artist for the UFC
- Delvin Hughley - former American football defensive back for the Baltimore Ravens and Denver Broncos of the National Football League and the Colorado Crush of the Arena Football League
- Todd Jones - Major League Baseball pitcher
- Joe Kines - College football coach
- Shed Long - professional Major League Baseball second baseman for the Seattle Mariners organization
- Darrell Malone - NFL defensive back for Kansas City Chiefs and Miami Dolphins, 1992–1994
- Ashley Martin - athlete who became the first woman to play and score in an NCAA Division I American football game
- Keith McKeller - former National Football League tight end with the Buffalo Bills
- Terry Owens- NFL San Diego Chargers
- Ryan Perrilloux - former NFL quarterback for the New York Giants, Arena Football League New Orleans Voodoo
- Lainey Reid, Professional wrestler for WWE on the SmackDown brand
- Walker Russell, Jr. - NBA player for the Detroit Pistons
- Jason Seguine - Professional wrestler (as Buck Quartermain) and football player
- Matt Wallace - Professional golfer on the PGA Tour and DP World Tour, winner of the 2023 Corales Puntacana Championship.
- Danny Willett - Professional golfer on the European Tour, winner of the 2016 Masters Tournament
- Mark Word - former National Football League defensive end who played for the Kansas City Chiefs & Cleveland Browns
- Alvin Wright - former National Football League nose guard with the Los Angeles Rams

== Business ==
- Keith Creel - CEO of Canadian Pacific Railway
- Steve Nix - CEO of AlaTrust Credit Union

== Media and entertainment ==
- Rick Burgess and Bill "Bubba" Bussey - radio personalities. Burgess is the son of retired Hall of Fame JSU Football Coach Bill Burgess.
- Catherine Callaway - CNN Tonight news anchor
- John Craton - classical composer
- Cary Guffey - financial planner, Star of the 1977 Steven Spielberg film "Close Encounters of the Third Kind"
- Jamey Johnson - country music artist. Recipient of multiple ACM and CMA Awards. Former mellophone player for the Marching Southerners.
- Mai Martinez - co-anchor at CBS 2 in Chicago
- Randy Owen - lead singer of the record award-winning country music band Alabama. Current member of JSU Board of Trustees.
- Reynolds Wolf - CNN meteorologist and reporter
- Riley Green - country music artist. His song “Single Ladies” caught the attention of record label Big Machine Records. His next single “There was a Girl” reaches #1 on multiple country music charts.

== Pageant winners ==
- Teresa Cheatham - Miss Alabama, 1978; First Runner-up in 1979 Miss America
- Jamie Langley - Miss Alabama, 2007
- Heather Whitestone (McCallum) - Miss America, 1995
