= Roll On (Alabama album) =

1984 album by Alabama

Studio album by Alabama
- Released: January 16, 1984; October 25, 1990 (re-release)
- Recorded: 1983
- Studio: Cook Sound Studio, Fort Payne, AL Music Mill, Nashville, TN
- Genre: Country
- Length: 40:08
- Label: RCA Nashville
- Producer: Alabama; Harold Shedd

Alabama chronology
The Closer You Get... (1983)	Roll On (1984)	40-Hour Week (1985)

Singles from Roll On
- 1. "Roll On (Eighteen Wheeler)" Released: January 6, 1984; 2. "When We Make Love" Released: April 20, 1984; 3. "If You're Gonna Play in Texas (You Gotta Have a Fiddle in the Band)" Released: July 16, 1984; 4. "(There's A) Fire in the Night" Released: October 22, 1984

Alternative cover
- Alternative cover art for streaming services

Professional ratings
Review scores
Source	Rating
Allmusic	link

Roll On is the eighth studio album by American country music band Alabama, released on January 16, 1984 through RCA Records Nashville.

All four singles released from this album reached Number One on the Hot Country Singles chart: "Roll On (Eighteen Wheeler)", "When We Make Love", "If You're Gonna Play in Texas (You Gotta Have a Fiddle in the Band)" and "(There's A) Fire in the Night". Music videos were made for "I'm Not That Way Anymore" and "(There's A) Fire in the Night".

The album was certified quadruple platinum by the Recording Industry Association of America. The album reached No. 1 on the Billboard Country Albums chart and No. 21 on the Billboard 200.

== Track listing ==
No.	Title	Writer(s)	Length
1.	"Roll On (Eighteen Wheeler)"	Dave Loggins	4:21
2.	"Carolina Mountain Dewe"	Randy Owen	4:22
3.	"The End of the Lyin'"	Robert Byrne, Alan Schulman	2:59
4.	"I'm Not That Way Anymore"	Owen, Teddy Gentry, Mark Herndon, Greg Fowler	4:49
5.	"If You're Gonna Play in Texas (You Gotta Have a Fiddle in the Band)"	Dan Mitchell, Murry Kellum	4:28
6.	"(There's A) Fire in the Night"	Bob Corbin	4:14
7.	"When We Make Love"	Troy Seals, Mentor Williams	3:36
8.	"Country Side of Life"	Maurice R. Hirsch	3:46
9.	"The Boy"	Owen, Gentry, Fowler	3:34
10.	"Food on the Table"	Owen	3:59

== Personnel ==
Alabama

- Randy Owen: electric guitar, lead vocals
- Teddy Gentry: bass guitar, background vocals, lead vocals (9)
- Jeff Cook: electric guitar, organ, background vocals, lead vocals (8)
- Mark Herndon: drums

Additional musicians

- Jack Eubanks: acoustic guitar
- Gregg Galbraith: electric guitar
- Carl Jackson: banjo
- George "Leo" Jackson: acoustic guitar
- Shane Keister: keyboards
- Farrell Morris: percussion
- Fred Newell: electric guitar
- Larry Paxton: bass guitar
- Willie Rainsford: keyboards
- Larry Shell: acoustic guitar
- Milton Sledge: drums
- Blaine Sprouse: fiddle

Strings by the "A" Strings, arranged by Kristin Wilkinson

== Charts and certifications ==
=== Weekly charts ===
Chart (1984)	Peak position
Canadian Albums (RPM)	37
US Billboard 200	21
US Top Country Albums (Billboard)	1

=== Year-end charts ===
Chart (1984)	Position
US Top Country Albums (Billboard)	4
Chart (1985)	Position
US Top Country Albums (Billboard)	16
Chart (1986)	Position
US Top Country Albums (Billboard)	46

=== Certifications ===
Region	Certification	Certified units/sales
Canada (Music Canada)	2× Platinum	200,000^{^}
United States (RIAA)	4× Platinum	4,000,000^{^}
^{^} Shipments figures based on certification alone.
