= We Can't Love Like This Anymore =

Single by Alabama

from the album Greatest Hits Vol. III
- B-side: "Still Goin' Strong"
- Released: August 29, 1994
- Genre: Country
- Length: 3:16
- Label: RCA Nashville
- Songwriters: John Jarrard; Wendell Mobley
- Producers: Alabama; Garth Fundis

Alabama singles chronology
"The Cheap Seats" (1994)	"We Can't Love Like This Anymore" (1994)	"Give Me One More Shot" (1995)

"We Can't Love Like This Anymore" is a song written by Wendell Mobley and John Jarrard, and recorded by American country music group Alabama. It was released in August 1994 as the first single from their compilation album Greatest Hits Vol. III. The song reached number 6 on the Billboard Hot Country Singles & Tracks chart in December 1994.

== Chart performance ==
Chart (1994)	Peak position
Canada Country Singles (RPM)	7
US Hot Country Songs (Billboard)	6
