= Just Us (Alabama album) =

1987 album by Alabama

Studio album by Alabama
- Released: September 1987
- Studio: The Music Mill (Nashville, Tennessee)
- Genre: Country
- Length: 41:47
- Label: RCA Nashville
- Producer: Alabama; Harold Shedd

Alabama chronology
The Touch (1986)	Just Us (1987)	Alabama Live (1987)

Singles from Just Us
- 1. "Tar Top" Released: August 3, 1987; 2. "Face to Face" Released: December 1987; 3. "Fallin' Again" Released: March 28, 1988

Just Us is the eleventh studio album by American country music band Alabama, released in 1987. As with most of their albums, the band co-produced with Harold Shedd. The album charted at number 1 on Billboard Top Country Albums, and accounted for three singles. It also charted at number 55 on the Billboard 200.

== Content ==
The album's three singles all charted on Hot Country Songs: "Tar Top" made number 7, followed by the number 1 singles "Face to Face", which featured K. T. Oslin on guest vocals, and "Fallin' Again". Lead singer Randy Owen wrote or co-wrote all three singles.

== Critical reception ==
Professional ratings
Review scores
Source	Rating
Allmusic	2/5 stars

== Track listing ==
All tracks written by Randy Owen, except where noted.

No.	Title	Writer(s)	Length
1.	"Tar Top"		3:56 (4:55 on CD)
2.	"I Can't Stop"	Robert Byrne, Teddy Gentry	3:59
3.	"I Saw the Time"		3:56
4.	"You're My Explanation for Living"		4:19 (6:52 on CD)
5.	"Face to Face" (featuring K. T. Oslin)		3:01
6.	"(I Wish It Could Always Be) '55"		4:43
7.	"Old Man"	Gentry, John Jarrard, Lisa Palas	3:26
8.	"If I Could Just See You Now"	Jeff Cook, Lynde Darrell-Boles	3:14
9.	"Fallin' Again"	Greg Fowler, Gentry, Owen	3:58 (7:41 on CD)

== Personnel ==
From Just Us liner notes.

Alabama

- Randy Owen – lead vocals, electric guitar
- Jeff Cook – electric guitar, backing vocals, lead vocals (8)
- Teddy Gentry – bass guitar, backing vocals, lead vocals (7)
- Mark Herndon – drums

Additional musicians

- David Briggs – keyboards
- Costo Davis – synthesizers
- Mark Casstevens – acoustic guitar
- Steve Gibson – electric guitar
- Josh Leo – electric guitar
- Brent Rowan – electric guitar
- John Willis – electric guitar
- Mark O'Connor – mandolin
- Larry Paxton – bass guitar
- Eddie Bayers – drums
- James Stroud – drums
- Farrell Morris – percussion
- Charlie McCoy – harmonica
- Blaine Sprouse – fiddle
- Jim Horn – saxophones
- Mike Haynes – piccolo trumpet
- Bobby G. Taylor – English horn
- Sheldon "Butch" Curry – string arrangements
- The "A Strings" – strings
- Bobby Jones and New Life – backing vocals (3)
- K.T. Oslin – backing vocals (5)

Technical

- Alabama – producers
- Harold Shedd – producer
- Jim Cotton – engineer
- Joe Scaife – engineer
- Paul Goldberg – assistant engineer
- Milan Bogdan – digital editing
- Benny Quinn – mastering at Masterfonics (Nashville, Tennessee)
- Chuck Khun – photography
- Bill Brunt – art direction, design
- Mary Hamilton – art direction

== Chart performance ==
=== Weekly charts ===
Chart (1987)	Peak position
US Billboard 200	55
US Top Country Albums (Billboard)	1

=== Year-end charts ===
Chart (1988)	Position
US Top Country Albums (Billboard)	10

== Certifications ==
Region	Certification	Certified units/sales
United States (RIAA)	Platinum	1,000,000^{^}
^{^} Shipments figures based on certification alone.
