= Keepin' Up =

Single by Alabama

from the album For the Record
- Released: November 23, 1998
- Genre: Country
- Length: 3:05
- Label: RCA Nashville
- Songwriters: Greg Fowler; Teddy Gentry; Randy Owen; Ronnie Rogers
- Producers: Alabama, Don Cook

Alabama singles chronology
"How Do You Fall in Love" (1998)	"Keepin' Up" (1998)	"(God Must Have Spent) A Little More Time on You" (1999)

"Keepin' Up" is a song written by Randy Owen, Teddy Gentry, Ronnie Rogers and Greg Fowler, and recorded by American country music group Alabama. It was released in November 1998 as the second and final single from their compilation album For the Record. It peaked at number 14 on the country charts in the United States, and number 8 in Canada.

== Critical reception ==
Deborah Evans Price, of Billboard magazine reviewed the song favorably, calling it a "bouncy uptempo track." She goes on to say that the song "boasts an infectious melody buoyed by Jeff Cook's guitar prowess, and of course it just doesn't get any better than Randy Owen's lead vocal."

== Chart positions ==
"Keepin' Up" debuted at number 70 on the U.S. Billboard Hot Country Singles & Tracks for the week of December 5, 1998.

Chart (1998–1999)	Peak position
Canada Country Singles (RPM)	8
US Billboard Hot 100	69
US Hot Country Songs (Billboard)	14

=== Year-end charts ===
Chart (1999)	Position
Canada Country Tracks (RPM)	42
US Country Songs (Billboard)	59
