= Take a Little Trip =

Single by Alabama

from the album American Pride
- B-side: "Pictures and Memories"
- Released: June 1, 1992
- Recorded: January 1, 1992
- Genre: Country
- Length: 3:17
- Label: RCA Nashville
- Songwriters: Ronnie Rogers; Mark Wright
- Producers: Alabama; Larry Michael Lee; Josh Leo

Alabama singles chronology
"Born Country" (1991)	"Take a Little Trip" (1992)	"I'm in a Hurry (And Don't Know Why)" (1992)

"Take a Little Trip" is a song written by Ronnie Rogers and Mark Wright, and recorded by American country music group Alabama. It was released in June 1992 as the first single from their album, American Pride. The song reached number 2 on the Billboard Hot Country Singles & Tracks chart in August 1992.

== Critical reception ==
Deborah Evans Price, of Billboard magazine reviewed the song favorably, calling the band "ever economical" but saying that they opt to "make the most of what they've got-to a very determined and assertive beat."

== Chart performance ==
"Take a Little Trip" debuted at number 61 on the U.S. Billboard Hot Country Singles & Tracks for the week of June 6, 1992.

Chart (1992)	Peak position
Canada Country Singles (RPM)	2
US Hot Country Songs (Billboard)	2

=== Year-end charts ===
Chart (1992)	Position
Canada Country Tracks (RPM)	53
US Country Songs (Billboard)	19
