= Dancin' on the Boulevard =

1997 album by Alabama

Studio album by Alabama
- Released: April 8, 1997
- Recorded: October 1996
- Studio: Soundshop Studio A and Sony ATV Tree (Nashville, Tennessee).
- Genre: Country
- Length: 42:05
- Label: RCA Nashville
- Producer: Alabama and Don Cook

Alabama chronology
Christmas Vol. II (1996)	Dancin' on the Boulevard (1997)	Twentieth Century (1999)

Singles from Dancin' on the Boulevard
- 1. "Sad Lookin' Moon" Released: February 17, 1997; 2. "Dancin', Shaggin' on the Boulevard" Released: June 23, 1997; 3. "Of Course I'm Alright" Released: October 11, 1997; 4. "She's Got That Look in Her Eyes" Released: February 9, 1998

Dancin' on the Boulevard is the seventeenth studio album by American country music band Alabama, released in 1997 by RCA Records. It includes the singles "Dancin, Shaggin' on the Boulevard", "Sad Lookin' Moon," "She's Got That Look in Her Eyes" and "Of Course I'm Alright". Also included on the album are cover versions of The Temptations' "My Girl" and Bruce Channel's "Hey! Baby". The album peaked at number five on Billboard Country Albums Chart and number 55 on Billboard 200.

== Content ==
Dancin' on the Boulevard was produced by the band, along with Don Cook. "Sad Lookin' Moon" was the first single-release from the album, peaking at number two in the US Hot Country Songs chart in 1997. Following it was the title track which, like "Sad Lookin' Moon", was co-written by lead singer Randy Owen along with bass guitarist Teddy Gentry and frequent collaborator Greg Fowler. This song reached number 3 on the same chart late that year. "Of Course I'm Alright" followed late in the year and reached number 22. Finishing off the single releases was "She's Got That Look in Her Eyes", an Owen-Gentry collaboration which peaked at #21.

Dancin' on the Boulevard opened at 18,000 units in its first week, entering at number 7 at the Country Albums Chart and number 67 on the Billboard 200, which it was at that time, the group's biggest opening week of sales of their career since Nielsen Soundscan was implemented in 1991. In its second week, the album moved up to 21,000 copies, charting both at number five and number 55 in the Billboard country and main charts, respectively.

Two covers are included on the album as well: "Hey! Baby" and "My Girl", originally Number One pop hits for Bruce Channel and The Temptations, respectively.

== Critical reception ==
Thom Owens of Allmusic gave the album a two-star rating out of five, calling it "a fairly predictable and routine record that only catches fire on its singles".

== Track listing ==
No.	Title	Writer(s)	Length
1.	"Dancin', Shaggin' on the Boulevard"	Randy Owen, Teddy Gentry, Greg Fowler	4:43
2.	"Sad Lookin' Moon"	Owen, Gentry, Fowler	3:33
3.	"Anytime (I'm Your Man)"	Owen, Gentry, Fowler, Ronnie Rogers	3:52
4.	"She's Got That Look in Her Eyes"	Owen, Gentry	3:18
5.	"My Girl"	Ronald White, William Robinson	3:08
6.	"Of Course I'm Alright"	Billy Kirsch	3:44
7.	"I Just Couldn't Say No"	Owen, Gentry, Fowler	4:35
8.	"Is the Magic Still There"	Owen, Gentry, Fowler	3:14
9.	"Calling All Angels"	Jeff Jones	4:37
10.	"Hey! Baby"	Bruce Channel, Margaret Cobb	3:06
11.	"One More Time Around"	Owen, Gentry, Fowler, Tim Briggs, Larry Hanson	4:15

== Personnel ==
As listed in liner notes.

Alabama

- Randy Owen – lead vocals, backing vocals
- Jeff Cook – electric guitars, backing vocals, lead vocals (10)
- Teddy Gentry – bass guitar, backing vocals, lead vocals (5)

Alabama's drummer, Mark Herndon, does not play on the album.

Additional musicians

- John Barlow Jarvis – acoustic piano, keyboards, Hammond B3 organ, Wurlitzer organ, synth bass
- Steve Nathan – acoustic piano, keyboards, Hammond B3 organ
- Mark Casstevens – acoustic guitars
- Brent Rowan – electric guitars, slide guitar, 12-string guitar, mandolin
- Larry Paxton – bass guitar
- Lonnie Wilson – drums, percussion
- Don Jackson – baritone saxophone
- Denis Solee – tenor saxophone
- Dennis Good – trombone
- Chris McDonald – trombone
- Mike Haynes – trumpet
- George Tidwell – trumpet
- Dennis Burnside – horn arrangements and conductor
- Terry McMillan – harmonica (10)
- Bruce Channel – backing vocals (10)

String section

- Dennis Burnside – string arrangements and conductor
- John Catchings and Bob Mason – cello
- Jim Grosjean, Gary Vanosdale and Kristin Wilkinson – viola
- David Angell, David Davidson, Conni Ellisor, Carl Gorodetzky, Lee Larrison, Pamela Sixfin, Alan Umstead and Catherine Umstead – violin

Production

- Alabama – producers
- Don Cook – producer
- Mike Bradley – recording, mixing
- Mark Capps – additional recording, recording assistant, mix assistant
- Bart Pursley – additional recording, recording assistant
- John Dickson – mix assistant
- Hank Williams – mastering at MasterMix (Nashville, Tennessee)
- Susan Eaddy – art direction
- Bill Brunt – design
- Blake Morgan – design
- Peter Nash – photography
- David Haskell – background photography

== Chart performance ==
=== Album ===
Chart (1997)	Peak position
U.S. Billboard Top Country Albums	5
U.S. Billboard 200	55
Canadian RPM Country Albums	2

== Certifications ==
Region	Certification	Certified units/sales
United States (RIAA)	Platinum	1,000,000^{^}
^{^} Shipments figures based on certification alone.
