= Southern Star (Alabama album) =

1989 album by Alabama

Studio album by Alabama
- Released: January 31, 1989
- Recorded: 1988
- Studio: The Castle, Franklin, Tennessee; Emerald Sound, Nashville, Tennessee
- Genre: Country
- Length: 45:43
- Label: RCA Nashville
- Producer: Alabama; Barry Beckett; Larry Michael Lee; Josh Leo

Alabama chronology
Alabama Live (1988)	Southern Star (1989)	Pass It On Down (1990)

Singles from Southern Star
- 1. "Song of the South" Released: November 7, 1988; 2. "If I Had You" Released: February 13, 1989; 3. "High Cotton" Released: July 28, 1989; 4. "Southern Star" Released: November 22, 1989

Professional ratings
Review scores
Source	Rating
Allmusic	4.5/5 stars

Southern Star is the twelfth studio album by American country music band Alabama, released in 1989. The album produced four singles, "Song of the South", "High Cotton", the title track and "If I Had You", all of which reached No. 1 on the Hot Country Singles charts between 1989 and 1990. It also reached No. 68 on the Billboard 200.

== Track listing ==
No.	Title	Writer(s)	Length
1.	"Song of the South"	Bob McDill	3:12
2.	"Down on the River"	Greg Fowler, Teddy Gentry, Robert Byrne	3:05
3.	"High Cotton"	Roger Murrah, Scott Anders	3:02
4.	"'Ole' Baugh Road""	Randy Owen	3:53
5.	"The Borderline" (featuring Charlie Daniels)	Larry Hanson, Virgil Beckham, Gentry, Fowler	4:34
6.	"I'm Still Dreamin'"	John Dillon, Steve Cash	3:01
7.	"Pete's Music City"	Monty Powell	3:35
8.	"Southern Star"	Murrah, Steve Dean, Rich Alves	3:11
9.	"If I Had You"	Danny Mayo, Kerry Chater	3:35
10.	"She Can"	Steve Seskin, Austin Gardner	3:39
11.	"I Showed Her"	Gentry, Fowler, Walt Aldridge	4:26
12.	"Barefootin'""	Robert Parker	2:48
13.	"Dixie Fire"	Jeff Cook, Vern Dant, Hunter Moore	3:58

Note: Tracks 6, 7, 11, and 13 were not added to the cassette version.

== Personnel ==
Alabama

- Jeff Cook – fiddle, electric guitar, background vocals, lead vocals on "Barefootin'" and "Dixie Fire"
- Teddy Gentry – bass guitar, background vocals, lead vocals on "I Showed Her", co-lead vocals on "The Borderline"
- Mark Herndon – drums
- Randy Owen – electric guitar, lead vocals

Additional Musicians

- Eddie Bayers – drums
- Barry Beckett – piano
- David Briggs – piano, synthesizer
- Larry Byrom – acoustic guitar
- Steve Cash – harmonica
- Mark Casstevens – acoustic guitar
- Steve Cropper – electric guitar
- Charlie Daniels – co-lead vocals on "The Borderline"
- Costo Davis – keyboards, organ, synthesizer
- Jimmie Fadden – harmonica, jew's harp
- Steve Gibson – acoustic guitar, electric guitar
- Owen Hale – drums
- Larry Hanson – electric guitar
- Craig Krampf – percussion
- Mike Lawler – synthesizer
- Bernie Leadon – banjo, acoustic guitar, mandolin
- Josh Leo – electric guitar
- Carl Marsh – Fairlight
- Farrell Morris – percussion
- Mark O'Connor – fiddle
- Larry Paxton – bass guitar
- Michael Rhodes – bass guitar
- Brent Rowan – acoustic guitar
- Biff Watson – synthesizer
- Reggie Young – electric guitar

== Chart performance ==
=== Weekly charts ===
Chart (1989)	Peak position
Canadian Country Albums (RPM)	4
US Billboard 200	62
US Top Country Albums (Billboard)	1

=== Year-end charts ===
Chart (1989)	Position
US Top Country Albums (Billboard)	12
Chart (1990)	Position
US Top Country Albums (Billboard)	46

=== Singles ===
Year	Single	Peak positions	
Year	Single	US Country	CAN Country
1988	"Song of the South"	1	1
1989	"If I Had You"	1	1
1989	"High Cotton"	1	1
1989	"Southern Star"	1	1

== Certifications ==
Region	Certification	Certified units/sales
United States (RIAA)	Platinum	1,000,000^{^}
^{^} Shipments figures based on certification alone.
