= My Home's in Alabama =

1980 album by Alabama

Studio album by Alabama
- Released: May 20, 1980; September 15, 1998 (re-released)
- Recorded: 1977, 1978, 1979, 1980
- Studios: LSI Studio, Pyramid's Eye, Music Mill
- Genre: Country
- Length: 39:09
- Label: RCA Nashville
- Producers: Alabama, Larry McBride, Harold Shedd, Sonny Limbo

Alabama chronology
Alabama Band No. 3 (1979)	My Home's in Alabama (1980)	Feels So Right (1981)

Singles from My Home's in Alabama
- 1. "I Wanna Come Over" Released: September 1979; 2. "My Home's in Alabama" Released: January 1980; 3. "Tennessee River" Released: May 16, 1980; 4. "Why Lady Why" Released: August 29, 1980

Professional ratings
Review scores
Source	Rating
AllMusic	3.5/5 stars

My Home's in Alabama is the fourth studio album by American country music band Alabama, released on May 20, 1980, on RCA Nashville. It was the band's major label debut and breakthrough album, peaking at number three on the Country album charts and number 71 on the US Billboard 200.

The title track pays homage to Alabama's southern rock roots. It reached number 17 on the Billboard Hot Country Singles chart in early 1980. Two other tracks — the fiddle-heavy, southern rock-influenced "Tennessee River" and the ballad "Why Lady Why" — were the band's first two number one songs, and laid the foundation for what became one of the most impressive popularity runs in country music history.

Also included on My Home's In Alabama is the band's 1979 single, "I Wanna Come Over", which peaked at No. 33 in November 1979. Both that song and the better-known title track were originally issued by MDJ Records, before the band was signed to RCA in early 1980. The album eventually became the group's first major-label debut studio album to be distributed by RCA Records in Nashville.

== Track listing ==
No.	Title	Writer(s)	Lead singer	Length
1.	"My Home's in Alabama"	Teddy Gentry, Randy Owen	Randy Owen	6:27
2.	"Hanging Up My Travelin' Shoes"	Gentry, Owen	Randy Owen	2:17
3.	"Why Lady Why"	Gentry, Rick Scott	Randy Owen	4:11
4.	"Getting Over You"	Cary Rutledge	Randy Owen	3:15
5.	"I Wanna Come Over"	Richard Berardi, Michael Berardi	Randy Owen	3:52
6.	"Tennessee River"	Owen	Randy Owen	3:04
7.	"Some Other Place, Some Other Time"	Jeff Cook	Jeff Cook	3:10
8.	"Can't Forget About You"	Gentry	Randy Owen	5:39
9.	"Get It While It's Hot"	Owen, Gentry, Cook, Scott	Randy Owen	3:03
10.	"Keep On Dreamin'"	Cook, Scott	Jeff Cook	4:04

== Personnel ==
=== Alabama ===
- Randy Owen - lead vocals and rhythm guitar
- Teddy Gentry - bass guitar and vocals
- Jeff Cook - lead guitar, keyboards, fiddle and vocals, lead vocals on "Some Other Place, Some Other Time" and "Keep On Dreamin'"
- Mark Herndon - drums (Track 2)

=== Other musicians ===
CREDITED:

- Jack Eubanks - acoustic guitar (Tracks 4, 6)
- Sonny Garrish - steel guitar (Tracks 5, 6, 7)
- David Humphreys - drums (Tracks 4)
- Leo Jackson - acoustic guitar (Tracks 4, 6)
- Terry McMillan - harmonica (Track 1)
- Fred Newell - guitar (Tracks 4, 6)
- Willie Rainsford - keyboards (Tracks 1, 4, 6)
- Billy Reynolds - guitar (Tracks 4, 6)
- David Smith - bass guitar (Tracks 4, 6)
- Strings arranged by Kristin Wilkinson and performed by "The Wire Choir".

UnCredited:

- Rick Scott - drums (Tracks 1, 3, 5, 6, 7, 8, 9, 10)
- Arliss Scott - rhythm guitar (Tracks 1, 3, 5, 6, 7, 8, 9, 10), gut-string lead guitar (Track 7)
- Hargus "Pig" Robbins - piano (Track 7)
- Strings (Track 5) arranged by Wayne Mosley

Production: Harold Shedd, Larry McBride & Alabama. Tracks 5 & 8 produced by Sonny Limbo (Associate producer, Shelton Irwin).

== Charts ==
=== Weekly charts ===
Chart (1980)	Peak position
Canada Country Albums (RPM)	1
US Billboard 200	71
US Top Country Albums (Billboard)	3

=== Year-end charts ===
Chart (1981)	Position
US Top Country Albums (Billboard)	13
Chart (1982)	Position
US Top Country Albums (Billboard)	8

== Certifications ==
Region	Certification	Certified units/sales
United States (RIAA)	2× Platinum	2,000,000^{^}
^{^} Shipments figures based on certification alone.
