= Tar Top =

Single by Alabama

from the album Just Us
- B-side: "If I Could Just See You Now"
- Released: August 3, 1987
- Genre: Country
- Length: 4:55
- Label: RCA Nashville
- Songwriter(s): Randy Owen
- Producer(s): Alabama; Harold Shedd

Alabama singles chronology
""You've Got" the Touch" (1987)	"Tar Top" (1987)	"Face to Face" (1987)

"Tar Top" is a song written by Randy Owen, and recorded by American country music group Alabama. It was released in August 1987 as the first single from their album Just Us. The song reached number 7 on the Billboard Hot Country Singles chart in October 1987, making it their first commercial single not to reach number 1 since 1980's "My Home's in Alabama".

== Content ==
The song references musical groups that Owen and his bandmates played in prior to the foundation of Alabama, and its title is a reference to a nickname that Owen had in the pre-Alabama days. Owen said that he wrote it a few years prior to the album's release, at a point when he "was making some personal assessments on what [he] could do and what [he] couldn`t do physically and mentally".

== Chart performance ==
Chart (1987)	Peak position
US Hot Country Songs (Billboard)	7
Canadian RPM Country Tracks	4
