= Of Course I'm Alright =

Single by Alabama

from the album Dancin' on the Boulevard
- B-side: "(I Wish It Could Always Be) '55"
- Released: October 11, 1997
- Genre: Country
- Length: 3:44
- Label: RCA Nashville
- Songwriter: Billy Kirsch
- Producers: Alabama; Don Cook

Alabama singles chronology
"Dancin', Shaggin' on the Boulevard" (1997)	"Of Course I'm Alright" (1997)	"She's Got That Look in Her Eyes" (1998)

"Of Course I'm Alright" is a song written by Billy Kirsch, and recorded by American country music group Alabama. It was released in October 1997 as the third single from the album Dancin' on the Boulevard. The song reached number 22 on the Billboard Hot Country Singles & Tracks chart while it reached number 23 in Canada.

== Chart performance ==
Chart (1997–1998)	Peak position
Canada Country Singles (RPM)	23
US Hot Country Songs (Billboard)	22
