= American Pride (album) =

1992 album by Alabama

Studio album by Alabama
- Released: August 11, 1992; March 7, 2000 (re-release)
- Recorded: January 1992–May 1992
- Studios: Emerald Sound Studio and Javelina Studios (Nashville, Tennessee)
- Genre: Country
- Length: 39:56
- Label: RCA Nashville
- Producers: Alabama; Larry Michael Lee; Josh Leo

Alabama chronology
Greatest Hits Vol. II (1991)	American Pride (1992)	Cheap Seats (1993)

Singles from American Pride
- 1. "Take a Little Trip" Released: June 1, 1992; 2. "I'm in a Hurry (And Don't Know Why)" Released: September 1, 1992; 3. "Once Upon a Lifetime" Released: December 15, 1992; 4. "Hometown Honeymoon" Released: March 29, 1993

American Pride is the fourteenth studio album by American country music band Alabama, released on August 11, 1992, by RCA Nashville. It included the singles "I'm in a Hurry (And Don't Know Why)", "Take a Little Trip", "Hometown Honeymoon" and "Once Upon a Lifetime". "I'm in a Hurry" was a Number One hit for the band, while the other singles all reached the Top Five on the U.S. Billboard country charts. "Between the Two of Them" was later released as a single by Tanya Tucker from her 1994 album Fire to Fire. "Richard Petty Fans" is a cover of "The Fans" from the band's 1986 Greatest Hits album with new lyrics to salute the fans of the retiring NASCAR driver Richard Petty.

Brian Mansfield of Allmusic rated the album three stars out of five, saying that it did not have any "surprises". The album was their first not to hit the Top 10 of Billboard Country Albums chart and peaked at No. 11. It ranked at No. 46 on the Billboard 200.

== Track listing ==
No.	Title	Writer(s)	Length
1.	"Take a Little Trip"	Ronnie Rogers, Mark Wright	3:17
2.	"Hometown Honeymoon"	Josh Leo, Jim Photoglo	3:18
3.	"Once Upon a Lifetime"	Gary Baker, Frank J. Myers	4:14
4.	"You Can't Take the Country Out of Me"	Rick Bowles, Robert Byrne	2:58
5.	"I'm in a Hurry (And Don't Know Why)"	Roger Murrah, Randy VanWarmer	2:50
6.	"Richard Petty Fans"	Greg Fowler, Teddy Gentry, John Jarrard, Randy Owen	3:35
7.	"Homesick Fever"	Owen, Rogers	3:53
8.	"Between the Two of Them"	Mickey Cates	3:58
9.	"American Pride"	Owen	4:42
10.	"Sometimes Out of Touch"	Fowler, Gentry, Rogers	3:36^{A}
11.	"Pictures and Memories"	Jeff Cook, Monty Wilson	3:41^{A}

- ^{A}Omitted from cassette version.

== Personnel ==
Alabama

- Randy Owen – electric guitar, lead vocals, backing vocals (10, 11)
- Jeff Cook – electric guitar, backing vocals, lead vocals (11)
- Teddy Gentry – bass guitar, backing vocals, lead vocals (10)
- Mark Herndon – drums, percussion, backing vocals

Additional musicians

- Bill Cuomo – keyboards
- Steve Nathan – keyboards
- Carl Marsh – synth bass (2), synth strings (3), synthesizers (5, 7, 11), synth harp (8)
- John Mattick – grand piano (6)
- Josh Leo – electric guitar (1, 4, 5, 7), tremolo guitar (1), guitar solo (4, 5)
- Chris Leuzinger – acoustic guitar (1), hi-strung guitar (1), electric guitar (10, 11)
- Bernie Leadon – acoustic guitar, mandolin (2), banjo (4), hi-strung guitar (5), tiple (5)
- Biff Watson – acoustic guitar, hi-strung guitar (1, 5), grand piano (5), classical guitar (6, 8)
- John Willis – electric guitar, acoustic guitar (8)
- Dan Toler – guitar solo (7)
- Richard Bennett – acoustic guitar (10, 11)
- Larry Hanson – acoustic guitar (10, 11)
- Craig Krampf – drums, percussion
- Sam Bush – fiddle (2)
- Bob Mason – cello (8)
- Jim Grosjean – viola (8)
- Conni Ellisor – violin (8), string arrangements (8)
- Ted Madsen – violin (8)
- "Raoul" – tick-tock (5)

Production

- Alabama – producers
- Larry Michael Lee – producer
- Josh Leo – producer
- Jay Messina – recording
- Steve Marcantonio – mixing
- Jeff Giedt – recording assistant, mix assistant
- Denny Purcell – mastering at Georgetown Masters (Nashville, Tennessee)
- Barbara Behler – production assistant
- Mary Hamilton – art direction
- Bill Brunt Designs – design
- Jim "Señor" McGuire – photography
- Charlie McCallen – hand tinting
- Cheryl Riddle – hair stylist, make-up
- Trish Townsend – wardrobe stylist

== Charts ==
=== Weekly charts ===
Chart (1992)	Peak position
Canadian Albums (RPM)	62
Canadian Country Albums (RPM)	4
US Billboard 200	46
US Top Country Albums (Billboard)	11

=== Year-end charts ===
Chart (1992)	Position
US Top Country Albums (Billboard)	52
Chart (1993)	Position
US Top Country Albums (Billboard)	23

=== Singles ===
Year	Single	Peak positions	
Year	Single	US Country	CAN Country
1992	"Take a Little Trip"	2	2
1992	"I'm in a Hurry (And Don't Know Why)"	1	1
1992	"Once Upon a Lifetime"	3	2
1993	"Hometown Honeymoon"	3	1

== Certifications ==
Region	Certification	Certified units/sales
United States (RIAA)	Platinum	1,000,000^{^}
^{^} Shipments figures based on certification alone.
