= She's Got That Look in Her Eyes =

Single by Alabama

from the album Dancin' on the Boulevard
- B-side: "That Feeling"
- Released: February 9, 1998
- Genre: Country
- Length: 3:38
- Label: RCA Nashville
- Songwriters: Randy Owen, Teddy Gentry
- Producers: Don Cook, Alabama

Alabama singles chronology
"Of Course I'm Alright" (1997)	"She's Got That Look in Her Eyes" (1998)	"How Do You Fall in Love" (1998)

"She's Got That Look in Her Eyes" is a song written by Randy Owen and Teddy Gentry, and recorded by American country music group Alabama. It was released in February 1998 as the fourth and final single from the album Dancin' on the Boulevard. The song reached number 21 on the Billboard Hot Country Singles & Tracks chart.

== Background and writing ==
Owen told Billboard magazine that the inspiration for the song was Farrah Fawcett's famous poster from the '70's. "If you listen to the words, it's a double play on the words. We didn't want to give it away. You remember when we were kids, every guy had that poster. That's really what the song is about."

== Music video ==
The music video was directed by Tom Bevins and premiered in March 1998. It was filmed in Nashville, Tennessee.

== Chart performance ==
"She's Got That Look in Her Eyes" debuted at number 67 on the U.S. Billboard Hot Country Singles & Tracks for the week of February 14, 1998.

Chart (1998)	Peak position
Canada Country Singles (RPM)	10
US Hot Country Songs (Billboard)	21

=== Year-end charts ===
Chart (1998)	Position
Canada Country Tracks (RPM)	68
