= Once Upon a Lifetime =

Single by Alabama

from the album American Pride
- B-side: "American Pride"
- Released: December 15, 1992
- Recorded: January 1, 1992
- Genre: Country
- Length: 4:14
- Label: RCA Nashville
- Songwriters: Gary Baker; Frank J. Myers
- Producers: Alabama; Larry Michael Lee; Josh Leo

Alabama singles chronology
"I'm in a Hurry (And Don't Know Why)" (1992)	"Once Upon a Lifetime" (1992)	"Hometown Honeymoon" (1993)

"Once Upon a Lifetime" is a song written by Gary Baker and Frank J. Myers, and recorded by American country music group Alabama. It was released in December 1992 as the third single from their album American Pride. The song reached No. 3 on the Billboard Hot Country Singles & Tracks chart in March 1993.

== Chart performance ==
Chart (1992–1993)	Peak position
Canada Country Singles (RPM)	2
US Hot Country Songs (Billboard)	3

=== Year-end charts ===
Chart (1993)	Position
Canada Country Tracks (RPM)	53
US Country Songs (Billboard)	54
