= Here We Are (Alabama song) =

Single by Alabama

from the album Pass It On Down
- B-side: "Gulf of Mexico"
- Released: June 3, 1991
- Recorded: February 1990
- Genre: Country
- Length: 2:52
- Label: RCA Nashville
- Songwriters: Beth Nielsen Chapman; Vince Gill
- Producers: Alabama; Larry Michael Lee; Josh Leo

Alabama singles chronology
"Down Home" (1991)	"Here We Are" (1991)	"Then Again" (1991)

"Here We Are" is a song written by Vince Gill and Beth Nielsen Chapman, and recorded by American country music group Alabama. It was released in June 1991 as the fifth and final single from their album Pass It On Down. The song reached number 2 on the Billboard Hot Country Singles & Tracks chart in August 1991.

== Chart performance ==
Chart (1991)	Peak position
Canada Country Singles (RPM)	3
US Hot Country Songs (Billboard)	2

=== Year-end charts ===
Chart (1991)	Position
Canada Country Tracks (RPM)	35
US Country Songs (Billboard)	20
