= Fallin' Again =

1988 single by Alabama

Single by Alabama

from the album Just Us
- B-side: "I Saw the Time"
- Released: March 28, 1988
- Recorded: 1987
- Genre: Country
- Length: 3:33 (single edit); 3:58 (LP/CS album version); 7:42 (CD album version)
- Label: RCA Nashville
- Songwriters: Greg Fowler, Teddy Gentry, Randy Owen
- Producers: Harold Shedd, Alabama

Alabama singles chronology
"Face to Face" (1987)	"Fallin' Again" (1988)	"Song of the South" (1988)

"Fallin' Again" is a song written by Randy Owen, Teddy Gentry and Greg Fowler, and recorded by American country music group Alabama. It was released in March 1988 as the third and final single from their album Just Us. It was a number-one hit in both the United States and Canada.

== Single and album versions ==
Three versions of "Fallin' Again" exist:

- The full-length version, included exclusively on CD and digital pressings of Just Us, which clocks at 7:42 and closes with a jam session that lasts over three minutes before ending with Owen saying "We can quit now".
- A much shorter version, included on LP and cassette pressings of the album, runs at 3:58. Half of the intro is excised; the line "I fall in and again" is deleted from each refrain; one bar of the first bridge is deleted; and a fade-out a few seconds after the final refrain. This version appears on many of the band's compilation albums, including Greatest Hits Vol. II and For the Record.
- The single version, which runs at 3:33 and edited differently from the full-length version (with the exception of the fade-out after the final refrain), omits the first instrumental passage and bridge. This version is available on the 1996 Time-Life Legendary Country Singers compilation.

"Fallin' Again" is the most heavily edited single release in Alabama's catalog.

== Charts ==
=== Weekly charts ===
Chart (1988)	Peak position
US Hot Country Songs (Billboard)	1
Canadian RPM Country Tracks	1

=== Year-end charts ===
Chart (1988)	Position
Canadian RPM Country Tracks	31
US Hot Country Songs (Billboard)	28
