= Why Lady Why (Alabama song) =

Single by Alabama

from the album My Home's in Alabama
- B-side: "I Wanna Come Over"
- Released: August 29, 1980 (U.S.)
- Recorded: 1978 LSI Studios, Nashville TN String overdubs Late 1979 Music Mill, Nashville TN
- Genre: Country, country rock
- Length: 3:09 (single edit); 4:11 (album version)
- Label: RCA Nashville 12091
- Songwriter(s): Teddy Gentry, Rick Scott
- Producer(s): Harold Shedd, Larry McBride and Alabama

Alabama singles chronology
"Tennessee River" (1980)	"Why Lady Why" (1980)	"Old Flame" (1981)

"Why Lady Why" is a song written by Teddy Gentry and Rick Scott, and recorded by American country music band Alabama. It was released in August 1980 as the fourth and final single from the album My Home's in Alabama. The song was the group's second No. 1 song on the Billboard magazine Hot Country Singles chart.

== History ==
Originally, "Why Lady Why" was recorded and released on the band's independent release, ALABAMA BAND: # 3 in 1978. A snippet of the track was issued as the B-side to the song "My Home's in Alabama," released by MDJ Records in January 1980. When the band signed with MDJ records and started working with producer Harold Shedd, the original track was remixed and Kristin Wilkinson & the WIRE CHOIR's strings were added. The song later was issued as a single in its own right by RCA in August 1980. The B-side: "I Wanna Come Over," the band's first Top 40 hit.

== Personnel ==
Original Session, LSI Studios, 1978:

Randy Owen - Lead Vocal, Rhythm Guitar

Jeff Cook - Harmony Vocal, electric lead guitar, Piano

Teddy Gentry - Harmony Vocal, Bass Guitar

Rick Scott - Drums, Percussion

Arliss Scott - Rhythm Guitar

Harold Shedd's production addition, MUSIC MILL, 1979:

Kristin Wilkinson and the Wire Choir - String Orchestra

== Single and album versions ==
The single and album versions are noticeably different. The single version — which is included on Alabama's For the Record — can be distinguished by an edited shorter introduction, abridged or deleted musical interludes, an edited musical outro, and a noticeably different EQ mix . The original album version is part of Alabama's 1986 Greatest Hits album.

== Chart performance ==
Chart (1980)	Peak position
US Hot Country Songs (Billboard)	1
Canadian RPM Country Tracks	3
