= Hometown Honeymoon =

Single by Alabama

from the album American Pride
- B-side: "Homesick Fever"
- Released: March 29, 1993
- Recorded: January 1, 1992
- Genre: Country
- Length: 3:18
- Label: RCA Nashville
- Songwriters: Josh Leo; Jim Photoglo
- Producers: Alabama; Larry Michael Lee; Josh Leo

Alabama singles chronology
"Once Upon a Lifetime" (1992)	"Hometown Honeymoon" (1993)	"Reckless" (1993)

"Hometown Honeymoon" is a song written by Josh Leo and Jim Photoglo, and recorded by American country music group Alabama. It was released in March 1993 as the fourth and final single from their album, American Pride. The song reached number 3 on the Billboard Hot Country Singles & Tracks chart in June 1993.

== Chart performance ==
Chart (1993)	Peak position
Canada Country Singles (RPM)	1
US Hot Country Songs (Billboard)	3

=== Year-end charts ===
Chart (1993)	Position
Canada Country Tracks (RPM)	49
US Country Songs (Billboard)	36
