= How Do You Fall in Love =

Single by Alabama

from the album For the Record
- B-side: "Keepin' Up"
- Released: August 1, 1998
- Recorded: 1998
- Genre: Country
- Length: 3:00
- Label: RCA Nashville
- Songwriters: Greg Fowler; Teddy Gentry; Randy Owen
- Producers: Alabama; Don Cook

Alabama singles chronology
"She's Got That Look in Her Eyes" (1998)	"How Do You Fall in Love" (1998)	"Keepin' Up" (1998)

"How Do You Fall in Love" is a song written Randy Owen, Teddy Gentry and Greg Fowler, and recorded by American country music group Alabama. It was released in August 1998 as the first single from their compilation album For the Record. It peaked at number 2 in the United States, and number 9 in Canada.

== Critical reception ==
Deborah Evans Price, of Billboard magazine reviewed the song favorably, calling it a "beautiful ballad, ripe with simple, universal truths about the mercurial nature of love and relationships." She goes on to say that Owen's "endearing vocal performance is as warm and comfortable as wrapping yourself in a favorite blanket."

== Music video ==
The music video was directed by Brent Hedgecock, and features the band singing the song in the rain.

== Chart performance ==
"How Do You Fall in Love" debuted at number 57 on the U.S. Billboard Hot Country Singles & Tracks for the week of August 1, 1998.

Chart (1998)	Peak position
Canada Country Singles (RPM)	9
US Billboard Hot 100	82
US Hot Country Songs (Billboard)	2

=== Year-end charts ===
Chart (1998)	Position
Canada Country Tracks (RPM)	93
US Country Songs (Billboard)	62
