= Southern Star (song) =

Single by Alabama

from the album Southern Star
- B-side: "Barefootin'"
- Released: November 22, 1989
- Recorded: January 1, 1988
- Genre: Country
- Length: 3:11
- Label: RCA Nashville
- Songwriters: Rich Alves; Steve Dean; Roger Murrah
- Producers: Alabama; Barry Beckett

Alabama singles chronology
"High Cotton" (1989)	"Southern Star" (1989)	"Pass It On Down" (1990)

"Southern Star" is a song written Rich Alves, Steve Dean and Roger Murrah, and recorded by American country music band Alabama. It was released in November 1989 as the fourth and final single and title track from the album Southern Star. The song hit number one in the United States on the Hot Country Singles charts.

== Chart history ==
Chart (1989–1990)	Peak position
Canada Country Singles (RPM)	1
US Hot Country Songs (Billboard)	1

=== Year-end charts ===
Chart (1990)	Position
Canada Country Tracks (RPM)	25
US Country Songs (Billboard)	11

== Other versions ==
David Allan Coe recorded the song prior to Alabama on his 1987 album A matter of life and death.
