= Sad Lookin' Moon =

Single by Alabama

from the album Dancin' on the Boulevard
- B-side: "Give Me One More Shot"
- Released: February 17, 1997
- Genre: Country
- Length: 3:33
- Label: RCA Nashville
- Songwriters: Greg Fowler, Teddy Gentry, Randy Owen
- Producers: Alabama and Don Cook

Alabama singles chronology
"The Maker Said Take Her" (1996)	"Sad Lookin' Moon" (1997)	"Dancin', Shaggin' on the Boulevard" (1997)

"Sad Lookin' Moon" is a song written by Randy Owen, Teddy Gentry and Greg Fowler, and recorded by American country music group Alabama. It was released in February 1997 as the lead-off single from the album Dancin' on the Boulevard. It peaked at number 2 in the United States, while it was a number-one hit in Canada.

== Background and writing ==
Owen told Billboard that the song was written while they were in Pennsylvania. "We'd been playing guitars on the bus, and I looked out the window...and said it's a sad-lookin' moon tonight,' and Teddy said, 'Wow. Let's write that song.' So Teddy, Greg, and I just went to working on it, and things just kind of fell together, as good songs and good feelings often do."

== Content ==
The narrator thought that his ex-lover would be always his and that she would never leave. However, she left him, and now a sad lookin' moon shines down on him as he is feeling sad.

== Critical reception ==
Deborah Evans Price, of Billboard magazine reviewed the song favorably, saying that the song "demonstrates that there's still lots of creative juice flowing from country's most successful band." She says that the song includes a "strong melody, buoyed by Randy Owen's personality-packed vocal." She states that while the song contains all the familiar ingredients of Alabama, "there's a freshness and infectious excitement that's nice to hear from a band that's been churning out hits for more than 15 years."

== Chart positions ==
"Sad Lookin' Moon" debuted at number 45 on the U.S. Billboard Hot Country Singles & Tracks for the chart week of March 1, 1997.

Chart (1997)	Peak position
Canada Country Singles (RPM)	1
US Hot Country Songs (Billboard)	2

=== Year-end charts ===
Chart (1997)	Position
Canada Country Tracks (RPM)	36
US Country Songs (Billboard)	12
