= Roll On (Eighteen Wheeler) =

Single by Alabama

from the album Roll On
- B-side: "Food On the Table"
- Released: January 6, 1984
- Recorded: November 10, 1983
- Genre: Truck-driving country
- Length: 3:42 (single edit); 4:26 (album version)
- Label: RCA Nashville
- Songwriter: Dave Loggins
- Producers: Harold Shedd; Alabama

Alabama singles chronology
"Lady Down on Love" (1983)	"Roll On (Eighteen Wheeler)" (1984)	"When We Make Love" (1984)

"Roll On (Eighteen Wheeler)" is a song written by Dave Loggins, and recorded by American country music band Alabama. It was released in January 1984 as the first single and title track to the band's album Roll On. It was the group's 12th straight No. 1 single on the Billboard magazine Hot Country Singles chart.

== Content ==
"Roll On (Eighteen Wheeler)" was the story of a trucker who drives an over-the-road semi-trailer truck to support his wife and three children.

In the song's first verse, the man (referred to only as "Daddy") leaves for a several-day trip through the Midwest. When the children gather around their mother in sadness, she says all they need to do is remember the song their father had taught them ("Roll on highway, roll on along, roll on Daddy till you get back home, roll on family, roll on crew, roll on momma like I asked you to do"); those lyrics serve as the refrain of the song. In some versions, the song begins with a CB radio call saying "How about ya, Alabama, Roll On", which was recorded from an actual CB call placed to Alabama's bus in the late 70s.

In the song's second verse, the man's wife receives a late-night phone call from an unnamed source, informing her that the highway patrol had found a semitrailer truck jackknifed in a snowbank along an interstate highway in Illinois. Despite learning that the search for her husband had been called off due to the fierce blizzard, and that Daddy had not been found at any of the local houses or motels, the mother remains confident that her husband will be found alive. The woman and her children are left to pray for Daddy's safety, and in sadness and anticipation of a long night of worrying, sing the refrain to the song to comfort them.

In the song's third and final verse, the mother and the children wait up all night long, thinking that the next phone call will bring the worst possible news. However, they believe "the Man upstairs" (an American reference to God) was listening – when the phone rings and the mother answers it, the voice on the other end is that of the dad, apparently safe and sound. He asks if they had been singing that song during the search for him.

== Single edit and alternate versions ==
The album version of "Roll On (Eighteen Wheeler)" is approximately 40 seconds longer than the 7-inch single released for radio airplay and retail sale. The album version can be distinguished by sound effects of a semitrailer truck (both the engine starting and, at the song's end, traveling down the highway), CB radio chatter and — toward the end of the song — an extra repetition of the refrain.

Much like the Greatest Hits 3 version of "If You're Gonna Play in Texas (You Gotta Have a Fiddle in the Band)", the version of "Roll On" on Greatest Hits 2 is slightly different as well, featuring a quick fadeout to omit the truck sounds at the end.

On the Livin' Lovin' Rockin' Rollin' box set, the album version is presented in its entirety with no crossfade to "Carolina Mountain Dewe", as well as a slight extension of the opening truck sound effects.

== Other versions ==
"Roll On" was originally recorded by Randy Parton in 1982 on RCA JK-13309.

A version by David Allan Coe appears on the album 20 Greatest Hits.

The song was also covered by Saddle Tramps and appears on the multiple-artist compilation album Nev Nicholls Presents Truckin Towards 2000.

It has also been covered by Aaron Tippin on his 2009 album In Overdrive.

Country music band Old Dominion covered the song from the television special CMT Giants: Alabama.

== Chart positions ==
Chart (1984)	Peak position
US Hot Country Songs (Billboard)	1
Canadian RPM Country Tracks	1

== Certifications ==
Certifications for Roll On (Eighteen Wheeler)
Region	Certification	Certified units/sales
United States (RIAA)	Gold	500,000^{‡}
^{‡} Sales+streaming figures based on certification alone.
