= Pass It On Down (Alabama album) =

1990 album by Alabama

Pass It on Down

Studio album by Alabama
- Released: May 21, 1990; January 16, 1998 (re-release)
- Recorded: 1989–1990
- Studios: Emerald Sound Studio, Masterfonics Studio 6 and Recording Arts (Nashville, Tennessee); Cook Sound Studio (Fort Payne, Alabama).
- Genre: Country
- Length: 45:01
- Label: RCA Nashville
- Producers: Alabama; Larry Michael Lee; Josh Leo

Alabama chronology
Southern Star (1989)	Pass It on Down (1990)	Greatest Hits Vol. II (1991)

Singles from Pass It On Down
- 1. "Pass It On Down" Released: March 25, 1990; 2. "Jukebox in My Mind" Released: July 13, 1990; 3. "Forever's as Far as I'll Go" Released: October 18, 1990; 4. "Down Home" Released: February 4, 1991; 5. "Here We Are" Released: June 3, 1991

Professional ratings
Review scores
Source	Rating
Allmusic	3/5 stars

Pass It on Down is the thirteenth studio album from American country music band Alabama, released in 1990. Singles released from the album were the title track, "Here We Are", "Down Home", "Forever's as Far as I'll Go" and "Jukebox in My Mind". "I Ain't Got No Business Doing Business Today" is a cover of Razzy Bailey.

It peaked at No. 3 on the Billboard Country Albums charts and No. 57 on the Billboard 200.

== Track listing ==
No.	Title	Writer(s)	Length
1.	"Pass It On Down"	Randy Owen, Teddy Gentry, Will Robinson, Ronnie Rogers	4:53
2.	"Here We Are"	Beth Nielsen Chapman, Vince Gill	2:52
3.	"Down Home"	Rick Bowles, Josh Leo	3:29
4.	"Forever's as Far as I'll Go"	Mike Reid	3:36
5.	"Jukebox in My Mind"	Dave Gibson, Rogers	3:40
6.	"Moonlight Lounge"	Rogers	3:06
7.	"Goodbye (Kelly's Song)"	Owen	3:59
8.	"Fire on Fire"	Gentry, Rogers, Greg Fowler	4:28
9.	"Until It Happens to You"	Jeff Cook, Gentry, Rogers, Fowler	3:42
10.	"Gulf of Mexico"	Gentry, Robert Byrne	3:15
11.	"Starting Tonight"	Gentry, Fowler, John Jarrard, S. Alan Taylor	3:15
12.	"I Ain't Got No Business Doin' Business Today"	Danny Morrison, Johnny Slate	4:03

Note: The last three tracks were not added to the cassette or vinyl versions.

== Production ==
- Joe Galante – A&R direction
- Alabama – producers
- Larry Michael Lee – producer
- Josh Leo – producer
- Steve Marcantonio – engineer (1–8, 10, 11)
- Jim Cotton – engineer (9), mixing (9)
- John Estes – engineer (12), mixing (12)
- Jeff Giedt – second engineer (1–8, 10, 11), mix assistant (1–8, 10, 11)
- George Marino – mastering at Sterling Sound (New York City, New York)
- Lauren Koch – production coordinator
- Mary Hamilton – art direction
- Thomas Ryan Design – design
- Jim "Señor" McGuire – photography

== Personnel ==
=== Alabama ===
- Jeff Cook – electric guitar, fiddle, backing vocals, lead vocals (9, 12)
- Randy Owen – acoustic guitar, lead vocals (1–7, 10)
- Teddy Gentry – bass guitar, backing vocals, lead vocals (8, 11)

Mark Herndon, Alabama's drummer, does not play on the album.

=== Additional Musicians ===
- Bill Cuomo – keyboards
- Biff Watson – keyboards, acoustic guitar
- Bernie Leadon – acoustic guitar, banjo
- Josh Leo – electric guitar
- John Willis – electric guitar
- Kenny Bell – high-string guitar
- Glenn Worf – bass guitar
- Craig Krampf – drums, percussion
- Sam Bush – fiddle, mandolin
- Rob Hajacos – fiddle
- Mike Haynes – trumpet
- Bobby G. Taylor – oboe
- John Catchings – cello

Kids Choir

- Kristin DeLauer – choir conductor
- Benji Cowart
- Jeremy Cowart
- Lara Gardner
- Tommy Gardner
- Heather Holland
- Shannon Love
- Susannah Smith
- Ben Voltz
- Heather Voltz
- Heidi Voltz

== Chart performance ==
=== Weekly charts ===
Chart (1990)	Peak position
US Billboard 200	57
US Top Country Albums (Billboard)	3

=== Year-end charts ===
Chart (1990)	Position
US Top Country Albums (Billboard)	29
Chart (1991)	Position
US Top Country Albums (Billboard)	14

=== Singles ===
Year	Single	Peak chart positions		
Year	Single	US Country	US AC	CAN Country
1990	"Pass It On Down"	3	—	2
1990	"Jukebox in My Mind"	1	—	1
1990	"Forever's as Far as I'll Go"	1	14	3
1991	"Down Home"	1	—	1
1991	"Here We Are"	2	—	3

== Certifications ==
Region	Certification	Certified units/sales
United States (RIAA)	Platinum	1,000,000^{^}
^{^} Shipments figures based on certification alone.
