= (There's A) Fire in the Night =

Single by Alabama

from the album Roll On
- B-side: "Rock on the Bayou"
- Released: October 22, 1984
- Recorded: 1983
- Genre: Country rock
- Length: 3:59 (single edit); 4:14 (album version)
- Label: RCA Nashville
- Songwriter: Bob Corbin
- Producers: Harold Shedd and Alabama

Alabama singles chronology
"If You're Gonna Play in Texas (You Gotta Have a Fiddle in the Band)" (1984)	"(There's A) Fire in the Night" (1984)	"There's No Way" (1985)

Music video
- "(There's A) Fire in the Night" at CMT.com

"(There's A) Fire in the Night" is a song written by Bob Corbin, and recorded by American country music band Alabama. It was released in October 1984 as the fourth and final single from the band's album Roll On. The song became the group's 15th straight No. 1 single on the Billboard magazine Hot Country Singles chart in January 1985.

== Single and album edits ==
A slightly early fade on the single version is the only difference between the single and album versions of "(There's a) Fire in the Night".

== Music video ==
A video of the song, directed by David Hogan and depicting the band camping in a forest at night, has aired on The Nashville Network, CMT and Great American Country. It is not the original video, however. The original video, released in 1984, featured partial nudity and what writer Edward Morris described as a "bizarre plot". Alabama then decided the video was not family-friendly and, with the help of their management, had RCA Records withdraw the original video from circulation.

== Chart positions ==
Chart (1984–1985)	Peak position
US Hot Country Songs (Billboard)	1
Canadian RPM Country Tracks	1

=== See also ===
- Roland, Tom, "The Billboard Book of Number One Country Hits" (Billboard Books, Watson-Guptill Publications, New York, 1991 (ISBN 0-8230-7553-2))
- Whitburn, Joel, "Top Country Songs: 1944-2005," 2006.
