= Give Me One More Shot =

Single by Alabama

from the album Greatest Hits Vol. III
- B-side: "Jukebox in My Mind"
- Released: February 6, 1995
- Recorded: April 1994
- Genre: Country
- Length: 3:29
- Label: RCA Nashville
- Songwriters: Teddy Gentry; Randy Owen; Ronnie Rogers
- Producers: Alabama; Garth Fundis

Alabama singles chronology
"We Can't Love Like This Anymore" (1994)	"Give Me One More Shot" (1995)	"She Ain't Your Ordinary Girl" (1995)

"Give Me One More Shot" is a song written by Randy Owen, Teddy Gentry and Ronnie Rogers, and recorded by American country music group Alabama. It was released in February 1995 as the second and final single from their compilation album Greatest Hits Vol. III. It peaked at number 3 in both the United States and Canada.

== Critical reception ==
Deborah Evans Price, of Billboard magazine reviewed the song favorably, saying that "longtime fans of this venerable band will fall in love with this midtempo number and its upbeat, one-day-at-a-time message." She goes on to say that the hooks "are strong enough to reel in a few of the skeptics out there."

== Content ==
The song's narrator wants another shot and one more day as he struggles through life, including taxes.

== Chart performance ==
"Give Me One More Shot" debuted at number 56 on the U.S. Billboard Hot Country Singles & Tracks for the week of February 11, 1995.

Chart (1995)	Peak position
Canada Country Singles (RPM)	3
US Hot Country Songs (Billboard)	3

=== Year-end charts ===
Chart (1995)	Position
Canada Country Tracks (RPM)	92
US Country Songs (Billboard)	19
