= When We Make Love (Alabama song) =

Single by Alabama

from the album Roll On
- B-side: "Carolina Mountain Dewe"
- Released: April 1984
- Recorded: 1983
- Genre: Country, soft rock
- Length: 3:36
- Label: RCA Nashville
- Songwriters: Troy Seals, Mentor Williams
- Producers: Harold Shedd and Alabama

Alabama singles chronology
"Roll On (Eighteen Wheeler)" (1983)	"When We Make Love" (1984)	"If You're Gonna Play in Texas (You Gotta Have a Fiddle in the Band)" (1984)

"When We Make Love" is a song written by Troy Seals and Mentor Williams, and recorded by American country music band Alabama. The song — a love ballad — was released in April 1984 as the second single from the band's album Roll On, and was the group's 13th straight No. 1 single on the Billboard Hot Country Singles chart that June.

== Charts ==
=== Weekly charts ===
Chart (1984)	Peak position
US Hot Country Songs (Billboard)	1
US Billboard Hot 100	72
U.S. Billboard Hot Adult Contemporary Tracks	8
Canadian RPM Country Tracks	1
Canadian RPM Adult Contemporary Tracks	3

=== Year-end charts ===
Chart (1984)	Position
US Hot Country Songs (Billboard)	38
