= My Home's in Alabama (song) =

Single by Alabama

from the album My Home's in Alabama
- B-side: "Why Lady Why" (MDJ release); "I Wanna Come Over" (RCA release)
- Released: January 1980 (U.S.)
- Recorded: 1978 and 1979
- Genre: Country
- Length: 4:02 (RCA single edit); 6:27 (RCA album version); 8:40 (original unedited recording)
- Label: Alabama Records ALA-78-9-01 (originally); MDJ 1002; RCA Nashville 12008 (later)
- Songwriter(s): Randy Owen, Teddy Gentry
- Producer(s): Harold Shedd, Larry McBride, Alabama

Alabama singles chronology
"I Wanna Come Over" (1979)	"My Home's in Alabama" (1980)	"Tennessee River" (1980)

"My Home's in Alabama" is a song written by Randy Owen and Teddy Gentry, and recorded by American country music band Alabama. It was released in January 1980 as the second single and title track from the album My Home's in Alabama.

In the years since its release, "My Home's in Alabama" became widely considered as the song that sparked the band's rise to eventual superstardom.

== Content ==
The song, a biographical look at Alabama's early career, hopes and dreams, also pays homage to the roots of band members Randy Owen, Teddy Gentry and Jeff Cook. The lyrics state that, while bigger and better things lay ahead, their home would always be in Alabama, "no matter where I lay my head" and that they were "southern-born and southern-bred."

== Critical reception ==
Allmusic called the song "the closest thing to country rock" among the album's ten tracks.

== Background ==
"My Home's in Alabama" was originally recorded at LSI studios in 1978, and the full, unedited version was included on the band's independent release, THE ALABAMA BAND #3. When the band signed with MDJ records as a singles act and started working with producer Harold Shedd, the song was edited, and strings (Kristin Wilkinson & the WIRE CHOIR), harmonica (Terry McMillan) and additional keyboards (Willie Rainsford) were added by the Harold Shedd production team. It was then released as a single in January 1980 by MDJ Records, a small independent label that had also released Alabama's first Billboard magazine Hot Country Singles Top 40 single, "I Wanna Come Over" in the fall of 1979. The success of "My Home's in Alabama" (and the prior song) earned the group an invitation to the "New Faces" show at the annual Country Radio Seminar in Nashville, Tennessee. The resulting performance earned them a contract with RCA Records, to which they signed in April 1980.

Both "I Wanna Come Over" and "My Home's in Alabama" were subsequently issued on the band's first album for RCA records, with MY HOMES IN ALABAMA being the title track.

== Official State Ballad ==
A State Senate bill (SR-458) was passed 32-1 in 2000 to make the song the official State Ballad, with "Stars Fell On Alabama", a 1934 song (whose most popular release was by Jimmy Buffett) becoming the new official State Song, and the current State Song, "Alabama", written in 1931 by Julia Tutwiler would be moved to State Anthem status, but the bill failed in the State House.

== Single and album edits ==
Both radio edit and full-length album versions of "My Home's in Alabama" were released. The single version is 4:02, and fades out just as the album-version's extended guitar bridge begins. This version is available on The Essential Alabama, released as part of RCA's Essential Series (not to be confused with the repackaged For the Record).

The full-length RCA album version (and title track) — which includes the guitar bridge (that lasts about a minute and a half), a repeat of the refrain and the song-ending bridge reprisal — is 6:27, and is available, among other albums, on My Home's in Alabama. The unedited original track without the additional overdubs and production was included on the band's independent release, THE ALABAMA BAND # 3, clocking in at 8:40, and is noticeably mixed/EQed differently than what appeared on the MDJ/RCA releases.

In addition to the studio-recorded version, an eight-minute live version (from the Fort Payne June Jam in 1985) was released on Alabama's first greatest hits album and was also included on the band's 1988 live album, ALABAMA LIVE.

=== B-side ===
The B-side to the MDJ Records release of "My Home's in Alabama" was "Why Lady Why," which was also recorded during the sessions for the band's independent release, The Alabama Band #3, and received additional production from Harold Shedd. The song later became a single from the My Home's in Alabama album — and the band's second No. 1 hit. Later pressings issued by RCA had "I Wanna Come Over" as the B-side.

== Chart performance ==
Chart (1980)	Peak position
US Hot Country Songs (Billboard)	17

== Sources ==
- Himes, Geoffery, Alabama entry in "The Encyclopedia of Country Music: The Ultimate Guide to the Music." Country Music Foundation, Oxford Press, New York, 1998. ISBN 0-19-511671-2
- Millard, Bob, "Country Music: 70 Years of America's Favorite Music," HarperCollins, New York, 1993 (ISBN 0-06-273244-7)
- Whitburn, Joel, "Top Country Songs: 1944-2005," 2006.
