= Dancin', Shaggin' on the Boulevard =

Single by Alabama

from the album Dancin' on the Boulevard
- B-side: "Very Special Love"
- Released: June 23, 1997
- Recorded: 1996; The Soundshop Studio "A," Nashville, Tennessee
- Genre: Country; beach music
- Length: 4:43 (album version)
- Label: RCA Nashville
- Songwriters: Greg Fowler; Teddy Gentry; Randy Owen
- Producers: Don Cook; Alabama

Alabama singles chronology
| "Sad Lookin' Moon" (1997) | "Dancin', Shaggin' on the Boulevard" (1997) | "Of Course I'm Alright" (1997) |

"Dancin', Shaggin' on the Boulevard" is a song written by Randy Owen, Teddy Gentry and Greg Fowler, and recorded by American country music band Alabama. It was released in June 1997 as the second single from the album, Dancin' on the Boulevard. The song peaked at No. 3 on the Billboard magazine Hot Country Singles & Tracks chart in September 1997.

== Content ==
The song is one of several in Alabama's catalog paying tribute to their musical heritage. Here, the band reflects on their days of playing in the clubs of Myrtle Beach, South Carolina.

== Critical reception ==
Deborah Evans Price, of Billboard magazine reviewed the song favorably, saying that the lyrics "offer a wonderful stroll down memory lane for the members of Alabama." She says that even listeners who are unfamiliar with the band's history will "absolutely love the light and summery feel of the song." The production is described as "skilled" and "prominently marked" and she goes on to say that Owen's "warm and wonderful performance, this single could easily kick off a new dance craze."

== Music video ==
The music video was directed by Deaton Flanigen and was filmed in Myrtle Beach, South Carolina.

== Chart positions ==
"Dancin', Shaggin' on the Boulevard" debuted at number 61 on the U.S. Billboard Hot Country Singles & Tracks for the week of June 28, 1997.

| Chart (1997) | Peak position |
|---|---|
| Canada Country Singles (RPM) | 4 |
| US Hot Country Songs (Billboard) | 3 |

=== Year-end charts ===
| Chart (1997) | Position |
|---|---|
| Canada Country Tracks (RPM) | 67 |
| US Country Songs (Billboard) | 45 |
