= If I Had You (Alabama song) =

Single by Alabama

from the album Southern Star
- B-side: "I Showed Her"
- Released: February 13, 1989
- Genre: Country
- Length: 3:35
- Label: RCA Nashville
- Songwriters: Danny Mayo; Kerry Chater
- Producers: Alabama; Barry Beckett

Alabama singles chronology
"Song of the South" (1988)	"If I Had You" (1989)	"High Cotton" (1989)

"If I Had You" is a song written by Kerry Chater and Danny Mayo, and recorded by American country music group Alabama. It was released in February 1989 as the second single from the album Southern Star. The song was Alabama's twenty-fifth No. 1 single on the country chart, having spent one week at the top position as well as spending a total of thirteen weeks on the same chart.

The song was covered by Andy Williams on his 1991 album Nashville and Eddy Arnold on his 1993 album Last of the Love Song Singers: Then and Now.

== Chart performance ==
Chart (1989)	Peak position
Canada Country Singles (RPM)	1
US Hot Country Songs (Billboard)	1

=== Year-end charts ===
Chart (1989)	Position
Canada Country Tracks (RPM)	47
US Country Songs (Billboard)	42
