= Face to Face (Alabama song) =

Single by Alabama

from the album Just Us
- B-side: "Vacation"
- Released: December 1987
- Genre: Country
- Length: 3:02
- Label: RCA Nashville
- Songwriter(s): Randy Owen
- Producer(s): Harold Shedd, Alabama

Alabama singles chronology
"Tar Top" (1987)	"Face to Face" (1987)	"Fallin' Again" (1988)

"Face to Face" is a song written by Randy Owen and recorded by American country music group Alabama. It was released in December 1987 as the second single from the album Just Us. The song featured K.T. Oslin on guest vocals, although she was not credited, and was Alabama's twenty-second number one on the country chart. The single went to number one for one week and spent fifteen weeks on the country chart.

"Face to Face" is one of two singles released by Alabama to feature a female vocalist.

== Charts ==
=== Weekly charts ===
Chart (1987–1988)	Peak position
US Hot Country Songs (Billboard)	1
Canadian RPM Country Tracks	1

=== Year-end charts ===
Chart (1988)	Position
Canadian RPM Country Tracks	30
US Hot Country Songs (Billboard)	21
