= Tennessee River (song) =

Single by Alabama

from the album My Home's in Alabama
- B-side: "Can't Forget About You"
- Released: May 16, 1980 (U.S.)
- Recorded: April 16, 1980
- Genre: Country, country rock, bluegrass
- Length: 3:04
- Label: RCA Nashville 12018
- Songwriter: Randy Owen
- Producers: Harold Shedd, Larry McBride and Alabama

Alabama singles chronology
"My Home's in Alabama" (1980)	"Tennessee River" (1980)	"Why Lady Why" (1980)

"Tennessee River" is a song written by Randy Owen, and recorded by American country music band Alabama, of which Owen is the lead vocalist. It was recorded in April 1980 as the third single from the album My Home's in Alabama. The song was the group's first No. 1 song on the Billboard magazine Hot Country Singles chart.

== Song history ==
The song was officially Alabama's first single release by RCA Nashville after they had signed with the label in March 1980. The song is part of the band's first RCA album, My Home's in Alabama, which also includes two earlier singles: "I Wanna Come Over" and the title track; the earlier songs had originally been released by the small MDJ Records, even though there were later RCA pressings of "My Home's in Alabama" offered for retail sale and "I Wanna Come Over" was included as a B-side for their next single release, "Why Lady Why."

A fiddle-heavy celebration of growing up near the Tennessee River (which flows fairly close to Alabama's home base of Fort Payne), the song expresses the regrets of having gotten the urge to roam, gratitude of the few times the singer gets to enjoy spending time by the river, and a desire to eventually settle down and raise a family in the river's vicinity.

Country music historian Bill Malone, in his essay included in the liner notes for Classic Country Music: A Smithsonian Collection, noted that "Tennessee River" was among those songs where they "exhibit a deep love for their state and region ... and in the unpretentious sense of place and loyalty to home and family that they display in their personal lives and performances." Other songs in their repertoire - including "My Home's in Alabama," "Song of the South" and "Born Country," plus their Christmas song "Christmas in Dixie" - would exhibit those same sentiments. The Billboard editors praised the composition, noting the powerful instrumental parts and identifiable vocals.

"Tennessee River" began Alabama's string of 21 consecutive No. 1 singles in as many releases, a string that spanned from 1980 through 1987 and is generally considered not to include the 1982 Christmas song, "Christmas in Dixie".

== Alternate versions ==
The band originally cut a version over 5 minutes in duration for their independent release, ALABAMA BAND #3. When the band moved from MDJ Records to RCA, the label demanded that the "original" second verse in the song be dropped, so the band and producer Harold Shedd quickly cut a new version with session musicians and released the single a month later. When performing live, the band always plays their original arrangement, complete with the second verse. Jeff Cook commonly plays one part of the added guitar solo with his teeth. A live version with the extra verse is included on Alabama's first greatest hits album, while the commercially released studio version is available on their third.

== Cover versions ==
The song was later recorded by Hank Williams Jr. on his 1981 album Rowdy.

== Charts ==
Chart (1980)	Peak position
US Hot Country Songs (Billboard)	1
Canadian RPM Country Tracks	1

=== Year-end charts ===
Chart (1980)	Position
US Country Songs (Billboard)	5
