= Pass It On Down (song) =

Single by Alabama

from the album Pass It On Down
- B-side: "The Borderline"
- Released: March 25, 1990
- Recorded: 1990
- Genre: Country
- Length: 4:53 (album version) 3:50 (single edit)
- Label: RCA Nashville
- Songwriters: Randy Owen; Teddy Gentry; Will Robinson; Ronnie Rogers
- Producers: Alabama, Larry Michael Lee, Josh Leo

Alabama singles chronology
"Southern Star" (1989)	"Pass It On Down" (1990)	"Jukebox in My Mind" (1990)

"Pass It On Down" is a song written by Randy Owen, Teddy Gentry, Ronnie Rogers and Will Robinson, and recorded by American country music group Alabama. It was released in March 1990 as the first single and title track from the album of the same name. It peaked at number 3 in the United States, and number 2 in Canada.

== Music video ==
The music video was directed by Jack Cole.

== Chart positions ==
Chart (1990)	Peak position
Canada Country Singles (RPM)	2
US Hot Country Songs (Billboard)	3

=== Year-end charts ===
Chart (1990)	Position
Canada Country Tracks (RPM)	54
US Country Songs (Billboard)	35
