= High Cotton (song) =

Single by Alabama

from the album Southern Star
- B-side: ""Ole" Baugh Road"
- Released: July 28, 1989
- Genre: Country
- Length: 3:02
- Label: RCA Nashville
- Songwriters: Scott Anders; Roger Murrah
- Producers: Alabama; Larry Michael Lee; Josh Leo

Alabama singles chronology
| "If I Had You" (1989) | "High Cotton" (1989) | "Southern Star" (1989) |

"High Cotton" is a song written by Scott Anders and Roger Murrah, and recorded by American country music group Alabama. It was released in July 1989 as the third single from the album Southern Star. The song was one of four singles on the album to reach number one on the Hot Country Singles chart.

== Content ==
The song is a reminiscence of the youth of the narrator, who explains how his younger days were so good, and how he didn't realize how the times would change. "We didn't know that times were lean / Around our house the grass was green / It didn't seem like things were all that bad." The song references some the morals and customs characteristic of religious farming families, especially during the olden days, such as taking Sunday as a strict day of rest, whether or not there was work that could be done. The whole fourth stanza of the song references this "When Sunday mornings rolled around / We dressed up in hand-me-downs / Just in time, to gather with the church / Sometimes I think how long it's been / And how it impressed me then / It was the only day my daddy wouldn't work." It also glorifies a generally simple lifestyle of hard work. "I bet we walked a thousand miles / Choppin' cotton and pushin' plows / And learnin' how to give it all we had."

== Music video ==
The music video, directed by Jack Cole, consists of fairly modern (upon release of the song) footage of a farm. The early 1950s Cadillac convertible that is seen throughout the video is being driven by the band members, who seem to be observing with admiration the things they are viewing that relate to the context of the song.

== Chart positions ==
| Chart (1989) | Peak position |
|---|---|
| Canada Country Singles (RPM) | 1 |
| US Hot Country Songs (Billboard) | 1 |

=== Year-end charts ===
| Chart (1989) | Position |
|---|---|
| Canada Country Tracks (RPM) | 25 |
| US Country Songs (Billboard) | 13 |
