= Down Home (Alabama song) =

Single by Alabama

from the album Pass It On Down
- B-side: "Goodbye (Kelly's Song)"
- Released: February 4, 1991
- Recorded: January 1990
- Genre: Country
- Length: 3:29
- Label: RCA Nashville
- Songwriters: Rick Bowles; Josh Leo
- Producers: Josh Leo; Larry Michael Lee; Alabama

Alabama singles chronology
"Forever's as Far as I'll Go" (1990)	"Down Home" (1991)	"Here We Are" (1991)

"Down Home" is a song written by Rick Bowles and Josh Leo, and recorded by American country music band Alabama. It was released in February 1991 as the fourth single from their album Pass It On Down. The song hit number one on the Hot Country Singles chart in April 1991.

== Content ==
The song is about the narrator telling the story of his childhood growing up in a rural area or a small town ("Just off of the beaten path/A little dot on a state road map/That's where I was born and where I'll die"). The song continues by paying homage to the generally tighter knit social integrity of such rural developments ("Down home, where they know you by name and treat you like family/Down home, a man's good word and a hand shake/Are all you need").

== Chart positions ==
Chart (1991)	Peak position
Canada Country Singles (RPM)	1
US Hot Country Songs (Billboard)	1

=== Year-end charts ===
Chart (1991)	Position
Canada Country Tracks (RPM)	16
US Country Songs (Billboard)	8
