= Forever's as Far as I'll Go =

Single by Alabama

from the album Pass It On Down
- B-side: "Starting Tonight"
- Released: October 18, 1990
- Genre: Country
- Length: 3:36
- Label: RCA Nashville
- Songwriter: Mike Reid
- Producers: Alabama; Larry Michael Lee; Josh Leo

Alabama singles chronology
"Jukebox in My Mind" (1990)	"Forever's as Far as I'll Go" (1990)	"Down Home" (1991)

"Forever's as Far as I'll Go" is a song written by Mike Reid, and recorded by American country music group Alabama. It was released in October 1990 as the third single from the album Pass It On Down. The song was Alabama's twenty-ninth number one country hit. The single went to number one for one week and spent a total of twenty weeks on the country chart.

== Chart performance ==
Chart (1990–1991)	Peak position
Canada Country Singles (RPM)	3
US Hot Country Songs (Billboard)	1

=== Year-end charts ===
Chart (1991)	Position
Canada Country Tracks (RPM)	41
US Country Songs (Billboard)	3
