= If You're Gonna Play in Texas (You Gotta Have a Fiddle in the Band) =

Single by Alabama

from the album Roll On
- A-side: "I'm Not That Way Anymore"
- Released: July 16, 1984
- Recorded: November 3, 1983
- Length: 3:22 (single edit); 3:44 (Greatest Hits Vol. III); 4:28 (album version)
- Label: RCA Nashville
- Songwriters: Murry Kellum; Dan Mitchell
- Producers: Harold Shedd; Alabama

Alabama singles chronology
"When We Make Love" (1984)	"If You're Gonna Play in Texas (You Gotta Have a Fiddle in the Band)" (1984)	"(There's A) Fire in the Night" (1984)

"If You're Gonna Play in Texas (You Gotta Have a Fiddle in the Band)" is a song written by Murry Kellum and Dan Mitchell, and recorded by American country music band Alabama. It was released in July 1984 as the B-side of the third single from their Roll On album. Though "I'm Not That Way Anymore" was released as the A-side, radio programmers preferred the flipside and the song became Alabama's 14th consecutive number-one single on the Billboard Hot Country Singles chart.

During the first weeks the song was on the Billboard chart, "I'm Not That Way Anymore" charted concurrently, being listed as a tag-along B-side. Since "I'm Not That Way" was intended as the A-side, the song had an accompanying music video which was filmed at Fort Payne High School.

The chorus references "Faded Love" by Texas musician Bob Wills and "Louisiana Man" by Doug Kershaw repeatedly throughout the song, and the song also references Alabama's guitarist/fiddler, Jeff Cook with the line, "Them Texans raised the roof when Jeff opened up his case".

The song was used as the basis of "If You're Gonna Run in Texas", a radio campaign advertisement produced as part of U.S. Senator Ted Cruz's reelection campaign in 2018.

== Critical reception ==
Kip Kirby, of Billboard magazine reviewed the song favorably, saying that Alabama "obviously enjoys this high-energy instrumental romp through roots."

== Single and album edit differences ==
The single edit was more than a minute shorter than the original album version. Two features were deleted from the single version:

- The opening fanfare, featuring Alabama's vocalists — accompanied by just a piano — singing a few bars of "The Eyes of Texas". This introduction leads into the single's opening, which suddenly picks up the tempo to a quick duple meter.
- A second repeat of the refrain, the first part only accompanied by drums, before the fiddle-led bridge leading to the last part of the song.

The version that appears on the band's Greatest Hits Vol. III album does not include the intro but keeps the extra refrain.

== Charts ==
=== Weekly charts ===
Chart (1984)	Peak position
US Hot Country Songs (Billboard)	1
Canadian RPM Country Tracks	1

=== Year-end charts ===
Chart (1984)	Position
US Hot Country Songs (Billboard)	15

== Certifications ==
Certifications for If You're Gonna Play in Texas (You Gotta Have a Fiddle in the Band)
Region	Certification	Certified units/sales
United States (RIAA)	Platinum	1,000,000^{‡}
^{‡} Sales+streaming figures based on certification alone.
