= I'm in a Hurry (And Don't Know Why) =

Single by Alabama

from the album American Pride
- B-side: "Sometimes Out of Touch"
- Released: September 1, 1992
- Recorded: May 5, 1992
- Genre: Country rock
- Length: 2:50
- Label: RCA Nashville
- Songwriters: Roger Murrah; Randy VanWarmer
- Producers: Larry Michael Lee; Josh Leo; Alabama

Alabama singles chronology
"Take a Little Trip" (1992)	"I'm in a Hurry (And Don't Know Why)" (1992)	"Once Upon a Lifetime" (1992)

"I'm in a Hurry (And Don't Know Why)" is a song written by Roger Murrah and Randy VanWarmer, and recorded by American country music band Alabama. It was released in September 1992 as the second single from their album American Pride. The song hit number one on both the US Billboard Hot Country Songs chart and the Canadian RPM Country Tracks chart.

== Chart positions ==
Chart (1992)	Peak position
Canada Country Singles (RPM)	1
US Hot Country Songs (Billboard)	1

=== Year-end charts ===
Chart (1992)	Position
Canada Country Tracks (RPM)	67

== Certifications ==
Certifications for I'm in a Hurry (And Don't Know Why)
Region	Certification	Certified units/sales
United States (RIAA)	Platinum	1,000,000^{‡}
^{‡} Sales+streaming figures based on certification alone.

== Cover version ==
Florida Georgia Line covered the song on the 2013 album Alabama & Friends. This version peaked at number 47 on Hot Country Songs and number 82 on the Canadian Hot 100.

== Popular culture ==
"I'm in a Hurry (And Don't Know Why)" is featured in the first episode of the miniseries The Dropout, based on Elizabeth Holmes and the Theranos scandal. Holmes had named "I'm in a Hurry (And Don't Know Why)" as her favorite song in high school.
