= Song of the South (song) =

Single by Alabama

from the album Southern Star
- B-side: (I Wish It Could Always Be) '55"
- Released: November 7, 1988
- Recorded: January 1, 1988
- Genre: Country, southern rock
- Length: 3:12
- Label: RCA Nashville
- Songwriter: Bob McDill
- Producers: Alabama; Larry Michael Lee; Josh Leo

Alabama singles chronology
"Fallin' Again" (1988)	"Song of the South" (1988)	"If I Had You" (1989)

"Song of the South" is a song written by Bob McDill. First recorded by American country music artist Bobby Bare on his 1980 album Drunk & Crazy, a version by Johnny Russell reached number 57 on the U.S. Billboard country chart in 1981. Another cover by Tom T. Hall and Earl Scruggs peaked at number 72 in 1982 from the album Storyteller and the Banjo Man. A cover released in November 1988 by American country music group Alabama, from their album Southern Star, reached number 1 on both the U.S. and Canadian country charts.

== Content ==
The song tells the story of a poor Southern cotton farm-family during the Great Depression. "Cotton on the roadside, cotton in the ditch. We all picked the cotton but we never got rich." "Well, somebody told us Wall Street fell, but we was so poor that we couldn't tell." The song references President Franklin D. Roosevelt's New Deal in the line, "The cotton was short and the weeds was tall, but Mr. Roosevelt's gonna save us all."' The father of the family is a Southern Democrat; "Daddy was a veteran, a Southern Democrat. Said, 'They oughta kill a rich man to vote like that.'" The family loses the farm after the mother becomes ill. "The county got the farm and they moved to town." In the end, the family ends up living comfortably well, having sought a life in a more urban location; "Well, papa got a job with the TVA, we bought a washing machine, and then a Chevrolet."

== Cover versions ==
Country music singer Sam Hunt covered the song from the television special CMT Giants: Alabama.

== Music video ==
The music video, directed by Steve Boyle, consists mainly of black-and-white photos and footage of the South during the 1930s, as well as footage of members of the band and other actors in the South, which is also in black and white, to give the illusion that it was the 1930s when it was filmed. The content of the video mainly follows the song lyrics, such as the footage of President Roosevelt during the lines in the song where he is referenced, as well as footage of actor Clark Gable when the line 'gone with the wind' is uttered, a reference to the 1939 epic film of the same name, which starred Gable. The video turns to color during the chorus, showing a large crowd fronted by the band members marching down the street of a small town. At the end, the video is also in color and shows Alabama playing at a concert, at the end of which random people come onto the stage - including fellow RCA recording artists Baillie & the Boys and Jo-El Sonnier, as well as the comedians Williams and Ree. The onsite filming was done in Temperance Hall, Tennessee.

== Lyrics ==
While Alabama's version softened and left out a few lyrics, the original recording by Bobby Bare altogether stuck close to the lyrics as composed by McDill.

== Chart history ==
=== Johnny Russell ===
Chart (1981)	Peak position
US Hot Country Songs (Billboard)	57

=== Tom T. Hall/Earl Scruggs ===
Chart (1982)	Peak position
US Hot Country Songs (Billboard)	72

=== Alabama ===
Chart (1988–1989)	Peak position
US Hot Country Songs (Billboard)	1
Canadian RPM Country Tracks	1

==== Year-end charts ====
Chart (1989)	Position
Canada Country Tracks (RPM)	83
US Country Songs (Billboard)	41

== Certifications ==
Certifications for Song of the South
Region	Certification	Certified units/sales
United States (RIAA)	2× Platinum	2,000,000^{‡}
^{‡} Sales+streaming figures based on certification alone.
