= Jukebox in My Mind =

1990 song by Alabama

Single by Alabama

from the album Pass It On Down
- B-side: "Fire on Fire"
- Released: July 13, 1990
- Recorded: January 1, 1990
- Genre: Neotraditional country, honky-tonk
- Length: 3:40
- Label: RCA Nashville
- Songwriters: Dave Gibson, Ronnie Rogers
- Producers: Alabama, Larry Michael Lee, Josh Leo

Alabama singles chronology
"Pass It On Down" (1990)	"Jukebox in My Mind" (1990)	"Forever's as Far as I'll Go" (1990)

"Jukebox in My Mind" is a song written by Dave Gibson and Ronnie Rogers, and recorded by American country music group Alabama. It was released in July 1990 as the second single from their album Pass It On Down. The song reached number one on the Billboard Hot Country Songs in the United States and the defunct RPM country music charts in Canada.

== Content ==
The song uses a jukebox as a metaphor for the memories within the narrator's mind. The song includes the sound effects of a quarter dropping into a jukebox, as well as that of a phonograph needle. It is composed in the key of B-flat major with a moderate tempo and 4/4 time signature.

== Critical reception ==
An uncredited review in Stereo Review magazine of Pass It On Down described "Jukebox in My Mind" as "a fine song in the pure honky-tonk mold...which lead singer Randy Owen delivers in his best Merle Haggard syntax. The tune is vastly different from anything else the band has recorded". Kevin John Coyne of Country Universe rated the song "A", comparing the band's harmonies favorably to those of the Statler Brothers and concluding, "[i]t’s a bit out of their wheelhouse, but they do this kind of country well." In 1991, the Academy of Country Music nominated the song for Single of the Year.

== Chart performance ==
Chart (1990)	Peak position
Canada Country Singles (RPM)	1
US Hot Country Songs (Billboard)	1

=== Year-end charts ===
Chart (1990)	Position
Canada Country Tracks (RPM)	11
US Country Songs (Billboard)	18
