= 1985 in country music =

This is a list of notable events in country music that took place in the year 1985.

== Events ==
- January — In radio, the United Stations Programming Network’s "Solid Gold Country," a country music spinoff of the oldies-focused "Solid Gold Scrapbook," switches from a three-hour-a-week show to a five-day-a-week program (with the option to air all five hours in as a weekly program). Under the new format, each hourly program covered a different topic, such as a profile on a singer, songwriter or producer; a look back at the popular songs from the current week in a past year, gold records from the current month and other topics under virtually every conceivable topic. The new program will run 8-1/2 years.
- May 6 - 20th Academy of Country Music Awards: Alabama, George Strait, and Reba McEntire win
- A story published in The New York Times declares that country music is "dead." However, a number of new acts – Randy Travis and Dwight Yoakam among them – are working behind the scenes to change the trend.
- The Country Music Association Awards introduced a new award, Music Video of the Year. The first recipient was Hank Williams Jr.'s video for "All My Rowdy Friends Are Coming Over Tonight."

== Top hits of the year ==
=== Singles released by American artists ===
US	CAN	Single	Artist
1	1	40 Hour Week (For a Livin')	Alabama
1	1	Ain't She Somethin' Else	Conway Twitty
8	8	All Tangled Up in Love	Gus Hardin
8	22	Angel in Your Arms	Barbara Mandrell
1	1	Baby Bye Bye	Gary Morris
1	1	Baby's Got Her Blue Jeans On	Mel McDaniel
1	1	The Best Year of My Life	Eddie Rabbitt
5	5	Betty's Bein' Bad	Sawyer Brown
3	7	Between Blue Eyes and Jeans	Conway Twitty
15	13	Blue Highway	John Conlee
15	—	Break Away	Gail Davies
13	11	California	Keith Stegall
1	1	Can't Keep a Good Man Down	Alabama
9	11	Carolina in the Pines	Michael Martin Murphey
1	1	The Chair	George Strait
1	1	Country Boy	Ricky Skaggs
1	1	Country Girls	John Schneider
5	3	The Cowboy Rides Away	George Strait
1	1	Crazy	Kenny Rogers
1	1	Crazy for Your Love	Exile
9	8	Cry Just a Little Bit	Sylvia
15	20	Desperados Waiting for a Train	The Highwaymen
20	16	Dim Lights, Thick Smoke (And Loud, Loud Music)	Vern Gosdin
1	1	Dixie Road	Lee Greenwood
1	10	Does Fort Worth Ever Cross Your Mind	George Strait
8	5	Doncha?	T. G. Sheppard
1	1	Don't Call Him a Cowboy	Conway Twitty
3	5	Don't Call It Love	Dolly Parton
2	26	Drinkin' and Dreamin'	Waylon Jennings
20	17	Eye of a Hurricane	John Anderson
2	1	Fallin' in Love	Sylvia
5	10	The Fireman	George Strait
7	5	The First Word in Memory Is Me	Janie Fricke
1	1	Forgiving You Was Easy	Willie Nelson
17	5	The Girl Most Likely To	B. J. Thomas
1	1	Girls Night Out	The Judds
7	15	Got No Reason Now for Goin' Home	Gene Watson
15	13	Hallelujah, I Love You So	George Jones with Brenda Lee
1	1	Hang On to Your Heart	Exile
6	10	Have I Got a Deal for You	Reba McEntire
1	2	Have Mercy	The Judds
19	42	Heart Don't Do This to Me	Loretta Lynn
8	15	Heart Trouble	Steve Wariner
3	3	Hello Mary Lou	The Statler Brothers
2	2	High Horse	Nitty Gritty Dirt Band
1	1	Highwayman	The Highwaymen
1	1	Honor Bound	Earl Thomas Conley
1	6	How Blue	Reba McEntire
1	1	I Don't Know Why You Don't Want Me	Rosanne Cash
1	1	I Don't Mind the Thorns (If You're the Rose)	Lee Greenwood
1	3	I Fell in Love Again Last Night	The Forester Sisters
1	4	I Need More of You	The Bellamy Brothers
10	6	I Never Made Love (Till I Made It with You)	Mac Davis
8	6	I Wanna Hear It from You	Eddy Raven
5	3	I Wanna Say Yes	Louise Mandrell
10	9	I Want Everyone to Cry	Restless Heart
20	—	I'd Dance Every Dance with You	The Kendalls
1	1	I'll Never Stop Loving You	Gary Morris
1	5	I'm for Love	Hank Williams Jr.
10	7	I'm Gonna Leave You Tomorrow	John Schneider
10	10	I'm the One Mama Warned You About	Mickey Gilley
20	19	If It Ain't Love	Ed Bruce
12	22	If It Ain't Love (Let's Leave It Alone)	The Whites
10	5	If It Weren't for Him	Vince Gill
15	15	If That Ain't Love	Lacy J. Dalton
16	45	If the Phone Doesn't Ring, It's Me	Jimmy Buffett
5	1	In a New York Minute	Ronnie McDowell
12	31	It Ain't Gonna Worry My Mind	Ray Charles and Mickey Gilley
19	12	It Should Have Been Love by Now	Barbara Mandrell & Lee Greenwood
10	6	It's a Short Walk from Heaven to Hell	John Schneider
15	18	It's All Over Now	John Anderson
20	49	It's Time for Love	Don Williams
10	10	Kern River	Merle Haggard
4	—	A Lady Like You	Glen Campbell
9	8	Lasso the Moon	Gary Morris
19	21	The Legend and the Man	Conway Twitty
16	—	Leona	Sawyer Brown
6	6	Let It Roll (Let It Rock)	Mel McDaniel
16	33	Let Me Down Easy	Jim Glaser
23	20	Let the Heartache Ride	Restless Heart
2	3	Lie to You for Your Love	The Bellamy Brothers
1	1	Little Things	The Oak Ridge Boys
5	5	A Long and Lasting Love	Crystal Gayle
1	1	Lost in the Fifties Tonight (In the Still of the Night)	Ronnie Milsap
14	—	(Love Always) Letter to Home	Glen Campbell
1	1	Love Don't Care (Whose Heart It Breaks)	Earl Thomas Conley
1	1	Love Is Alive	The Judds
9	14	Love Talks	Ronnie McDowell
10	14	Major Moves	Hank Williams Jr.
1	1	Make My Life with You	The Oak Ridge Boys
8	23	Maybe My Baby	Louise Mandrell
4	1	Me Against the Night	Crystal Gayle
14	6	Me and Paul	Willie Nelson
1	19	Meet Me in Montana	Marie Osmond (with Dan Seals)
20	32	The Mississippi Squirrel Revival	Ray Stevens
1	2	Modern Day Romance	Nitty Gritty Dirt Band
2	2	My Baby's Got Good Timing	Dan Seals
9	9	My Old Yellow Car	Dan Seals
1	3	My Only Love	The Statler Brothers
19	—	My Toot-Toot	Rockin' Sidney
1	2	Natural High	Merle Haggard
1	1	Nobody Falls Like a Fool	Earl Thomas Conley
3	4	Nobody Wants to Be Alone	Crystal Gayle
2	1	Old Hippie	The Bellamy Brothers
4	3	One Owner Heart	T. G. Sheppard
5	6	Only in My Mind	Reba McEntire
9	8	Operator, Operator	Eddy Raven
1	1	A Place to Fall Apart	Merle Haggard featuring Janie Fricke
10	12	Pretty Lady	Keith Stegall
1	1	Radio Heart	Charly McClain
1	1	Real Love	Dolly Parton (duet with Kenny Rogers)
9	9	Rollin' Lonely	Johnny Lee
12	12	Save the Last Chance	Johnny Lee
1	1	Seven Spanish Angels	Ray Charles (with Willie Nelson)
1	1	She Keeps the Home Fires Burning	Ronnie Milsap
11	11	She Used to Love Me a Lot	David Allan Coe
1	1	She's a Miracle	Exile
6	22	She's Comin' Back to Say Goodbye	Eddie Rabbitt
9	5	She's Gonna Win Your Heart	Eddy Raven
2	1	She's My Rock	George Jones
2	2	She's Single Again	Janie Fricke
19	11	Size Seven Round (Made of Gold)	George Jones with Lacy J. Dalton
10	7	Slow Burning Memory	Vern Gosdin
1	1	Some Fools Never Learn	Steve Wariner
4	4	Somebody Else's Fire	Janie Fricke
1	8	Somebody Should Leave	Reba McEntire
26	14	Someone Like You	Emmylou Harris
2	1	Something in My Heart	Ricky Skaggs
6	24	Sometimes When We Touch	Mark Gray & Tammy Wynette
5	3	Stand Up	Mel McDaniel
1	1	Step That Step	Sawyer Brown
10	—	(That's What You Do) When You're in Love	The Forester Sisters
1	1	(There's A) Fire in the Night	Alabama
7	24	There's No Love in Tennessee	Barbara Mandrell
1	2	There's No Way	Alabama
19	37	They Never Had to Get Over You	Johnny Lee
14	14	Thing About You	Southern Pacific with Emmylou Harris
4	22	This Ain't Dallas	Hank Williams Jr.
1	1	Too Much on My Heart	The Statler Brothers
1	1	Touch a Hand, Make a Friend	The Oak Ridge Boys
14	18	Two Old Cats Like Us	Ray Charles with Hank Williams Jr.
3	1	Used to Blue	Sawyer Brown
2	3	Walkin' a Broken Heart	Don Williams
10	14	Waltz Me to Heaven	Waylon Jennings
4	3	Warning Sign	Eddie Rabbitt
3	1	What I Didn't Do	Steve Wariner
8	6	What She Wants	Michael Martin Murphey
17	46	When Givin' Up Was Easy	Ed Bruce
14	6	White Line	Emmylou Harris
3	2	Who's Gonna Fill Their Shoes	George Jones
5	9	With Just One Look in Your Eyes	Charly McClain (with Wayne Massey)
7	6	Working Man	John Conlee
10	27	A World Without Love	Eddie Rabbitt
2	2	Years After You	John Conlee
20	20	You Can't Run Away from Your Heart	Lacy J. Dalton
7	8	You Make Me Feel Like a Man	Ricky Skaggs
1	1	You Make Me Want to Make You Mine	Juice Newton
3	3	You Turn Me On (Like a Radio)	Ed Bruce
10	8	You're Going Out of My Mind	T. G. Sheppard
9	6	You've Got a Good Love Comin'	Lee Greenwood
10	7	You've Got Something on Your Mind	Mickey Gilley

=== Singles released by Canadian artists ===
US	CAN	Single	Artist
—	12	Blue Moon Cafe	Albert Hall
—	13	Counting the I Love Yous	Terry Carisse
73	10	Heaven Knows	Audie Henry
—	12	Hold On to What You Got	Gilles Godard
7	4	I Don't Think I'm Ready for You	Anne Murray
—	18	I Just Didn't Love You Very Well	John Winters
—	9	I'll Take Her Love Anytime	George Carone
—	10	I'm Glad We're Bad at Something	Ronnie Prophet & Glory-Anne Carriere
—	9	If You Can't Stand the Heat	Carroll Baker
95	5	It Always Hurts the First Time	Carroll Baker
—	19	The Loneliest Star in Texas	Terry Sumsion
—	7	Love Is the Reason	Mercey Brothers
—	9	Magic in the Music	C-Weed Band
—	11	She Saves Her Love for Me	Stoker Bros
—	18	She's No Lady	Paul Weber
—	17	Sonny's Dream	Valdy
—	10	Sweet Blue	Terry Carisse
71	10	Sweet Salvation	Audie Henry
—	10	Take Me Home Mississippi	Jamie Warren
—	15	That's When You Know It's Over	Terry Sumsion
2	1	Time Don't Run Out on Me	Anne Murray
—	17	Two Broken Hearts	Terry Carisse
—	12	We Can Only Pretend	George Carone
—	7	We Won't Ever Say Goodbye	Gilles Godard
—	10	You Lifted Me High Enough	Mercey Brothers

== Top new album releases ==
US	Album	Artist	Record label
1	40-Hour Week	Alabama	RCA
8	Alabama Christmas	Alabama	RCA
25	Amber Waves of Grain	Merle Haggard	Epic
1	Anything Goes	Gary Morris	Warner Bros.
8	The Ballad of Sally Rose	Emmylou Harris	Warner Bros.
7	Centerfield	John Fogerty	Warner Bros.
22	Darlin', Darlin'	David Allan Coe	Columbia
7	Don't Call Him a Cowboy	Conway Twitty	Warner Bros.
24	Favorite Country Hits	Ricky Skaggs	Epic
1	Five-O	Hank Williams Jr.	Curb/Warner Bros.
4	The Forester Sisters	The Forester Sisters	Warner Bros.
4	Greatest Hits	George Strait	MCA
25	Get to the Heart	Barbara Mandrell	MCA
1	Greatest Hits	Earl Thomas Conley	RCA
4	Greatest Hits	Lee Greenwood	MCA
1	Greatest Hits Vol. 2	Ronnie Milsap	RCA
10	Half Nelson	Willie Nelson	Columbia
1	Greatest Hits Volume 2	Hank Williams Jr.	Curb/Warner Bros.
2	Hang On to Your Heart	Exile	Epic
1	The Heart of the Matter	Kenny Rogers	RCA
23	High Country Snows	Dan Fogelberg	Full Moon/Epic
1	Highwayman	The Highwaymen	Columbia
10	Howard & David	The Bellamy Brothers	Curb/MCA
1	I Have Returned	Ray Stevens	MCA
8	Kern River	Merle Haggard	Epic
7	Last Mango in Paris	Jimmy Buffett	MCA
4	Let It Roll	Mel McDaniel	Capitol
22	Life Highway	Steve Wariner	MCA
1	Live in London	Ricky Skaggs	Epic
1	Lost in the Fifties Tonight	Ronnie Milsap	RCA
17	Love Is What We Make It	Kenny Rogers	Liberty
3	Me and Paul	Willie Nelson	Columbia
1	A Memory Like You	John Schneider	MCA
13	My Toot Toot	Rockin' Sidney	Epic
17	Nobody Wants to Be Alone	Crystal Gayle	Warner Bros.
12	Old Flame	Juice Newton	RCA
24	Old Ways	Neil Young	Geffen
20	One Good Night Deserves Another	Steve Wariner	MCA
19	One Step Closer	Sylvia	RCA
1	Pardners in Rhyme	The Statler Brothers	Mercury/PolyGram
9	Partners, Brothers and Friends	Nitty Gritty Dirt Band	Warner Bros.
15	Radio Heart	Charly McClain	Epic
9	Real Love	Dolly Parton	RCA
10	Restless Heart	Restless Heart	RCA
1	Rhythm & Romance	Rosanne Cash	Columbia
1	Rockin' with the Rhythm	The Judds	Curb/RCA
2	Sawyer Brown	Sawyer Brown	Capitol/Curb
3	Shakin'	Sawyer Brown	Capitol/Curb
21	Somebody Else's Fire	Janie Fricke	Columbia
1	Something Special	George Strait	MCA
25	Southern Pacific	Southern Pacific	Warner Bros.
25	Stand Up	Mel McDaniel	Capitol
3	Step On Out	The Oak Ridge Boys	MCA
1	Streamline	Lee Greenwood	MCA
6	Sweet Dreams–The Life and Times of Patsy Cline (Soundtrack)	Patsy Cline	MCA
16	There's No Stopping Your Heart	Marie Osmond	Capitol/Curb
24	Tokyo, Oklahoma	John Anderson	Warner Bros.
15	Tryin' to Outrun the Wind	John Schneider	MCA
23	Turn the Page	Waylon Jennings	RCA
6	Who's Gonna Fill Their Shoes?	George Jones	Epic
1	Won't Be Blue Anymore	Dan Seals	Capitol

=== Other top albums ===
US	Album	Artist	Record label
27	12 Greatest Hits	Patsy Cline	MCA
50	19 Hot Country Requests	Various Artists	Epic
59	19 Hot Country Requests–Vol. 2	Various Artists	Epic
33	Atlanta	Atlanta	MCA
61	The Bama Band	The Bama Band	Compleat
29	The Best of Reba McEntire	Reba McEntire	Mercury/PolyGram
39	Big River–The Adventures of Huckleberry Finn	Various Artists	MCA
39	Biggest Hits	Charly McClain	Epic
33	Can't Run Away from Your Heart	Lacy J. Dalton	Columbia
29	Chasin' Rainbows	Conway Twitty	Warner Bros.
42	Christmas Present	The Statler Brothers	Mercury/PolyGram
29	Christmas to Christmas	Lee Greenwood	MCA
38	Cut from a Different Stone	Razzy Bailey	MCA
40	Dallas–The Music Story	Various Artists	Warner Bros.
28	Don't Make Me Wait on the Moon	Shelly West	Viva
64	Dreamland Express	John Denver	RCA
34	Eddie Rabbitt #1's	Eddie Rabbitt	Warner Bros.
42	From My Heart	Kathy Mattea	Mercury/PolyGram
27	Greatest Hits	Barbara Mandrell	MCA
33	Greatest Hits Vol. 2	John Conlee	MCA
60	Greatest Hits, Volume 2	Charley Pride	RCA
60	Greatest Hits Vol. IV	Don Williams	MCA
27	Have I Got a Deal for You	Reba McEntire	MCA
38	His Best	Merle Haggard	MCA
40	I Feel Good (About Lovin' You)	Mickey Gilley	Epic
32	It's Just a Matter of Time	Glen Campbell	Atlantic America
49	John McEuen	John McEuen	Warner Bros.
63	Just a Woman	Loretta Lynn	MCA
36	Keep Me Hangin' On	Johnny Lee	Warner Bros.
45	Keith Stegall	Keith Stegall	Epic
55	Lane Brody	Lane Brody	Capitol
53	Live! At Gilley's	Mickey Gilley	Epic
26	Livin' on the Edge	T. G. Sheppard	Columbia
62	Lone Justice	Lone Justice	Geffen
64	Love and Other Hard Times	Eddy Raven	RCA
60	Maybe My Baby	Louise Mandrell	RCA
27	Me and the Boys	The Charlie Daniels Band	Epic
35	Memories to Burn	Gene Watson	Epic
55	Music from Rustler's Rhapsody and Other Songs	Various Artists	Warner Bros.
58	Old Friends	Terri Gibbs	Warner Bros.
40	Past the Point of No Return	Jim Glaser	MCA/Noble Vision
48	...Say When	Nicolette Larson	MCA
35	Smile	Larry Gatlin and the Gatlin Brothers	Columbia
32	Sometimes When We Touch	Tammy Wynette	Epic
63	Song in a Seashell	Tom T. Hall	Mercury/PolyGram
27	Songs You Know by Heart	Jimmy Buffett	MCA
42	The Spirit of Christmas	Ray Charles	Columbia
54	T. G. Sheppard	T. G. Sheppard	Warner Bros.
54	Tender Loving Care	Tom Jones	Mercury/PolyGram
45	Tennessee Christmas	Various Artists	MCA
63	The Things That Matter	Vince Gill	RCA
48	Till I Made It with You	Mac Davis	MCA
31	Time Stood Still	Vern Gosdin	Compleat
27	Two Heart Harmony	The Kendalls	Mercury/PolyGram
49	Unchained	David Allan Coe	Columbia
33	The Very Best of Janie	Janie Fricke	Columbia
64	Wall of Tears	Gus Hardin	RCA
52	Where's the Fire	Leon Everette	Mercury/PolyGram
42	Whole New World	The Whites	MCA

== On television ==
=== Regular series ===
- Hee Haw (1969–1993, syndicated)
- That Nashville Music (1970–1985, syndicated)

== Births ==
- January 20 – Brantley Gilbert, singer of the 2010s best known for "Country Must Be Country Wide" and "You Don't Know Her Like I Do"
- May 14 – Dustin Lynch, country singer-songwriter of the 2010s and 2020s
- May 20 – Jon Pardi, country singer of the 2010s
- June 12 – Chris Young, winner on the fourth season of Nashville Star
- August 26 – Brian Kelley, member of Florida Georgia Line, a duo of the 2010s.
- September 1 — Charlie Worsham, singer/multi-instrumentalist honored by the Mississippi state senate
- September 19 — Chase Rice, country singer of the 2010s

== Deaths ==
- July 17 – Wynn Stewart, 51, key progenitor of the Bakersfield sound, known for hits such as "It's Such a Pretty World Today" (heart attack)
- August 8 – Benny Barnes, 51, former rhythm guitarist for George Jones, best known for his 1956 hit "Poor Man's Riches"
- October 11 -- Tex Williams, 68, Western swing and talking blues performer best known for "Smoke! Smoke! Smoke! (That Cigarette)" (pancreatic cancer)

== Hall of Fame inductees ==
=== Country Music Hall of Fame inductees ===
- Flatt and Scruggs (Lester Flatt 1914–1979 and Earl Scruggs 1924–2012)

=== Canadian Country Music Hall of Fame inductees ===
- Don Messer
- Hank Snow

== Major awards ==
=== Grammy Awards ===
- Best Female Country Vocal Performance — "I Don't Know Why You Don't Want Me", Rosanne Cash
- Best Male Country Vocal Performance — "Lost in the Fifties Tonight", Ronnie Milsap
- Best Country Performance by a Duo or Group with Vocal — "Why Not Me" The Judds
- Best Country Instrumental Performance — "Cosmic Square Dance", Chet Atkins and Mark Knopfler
- Best Country Song — "Highwayman," Jimmy Webb (Performer: The Highwaymen)

=== Juno Awards ===
- Country Male Vocalist of the Year — Murray McLauchlan
- Country Female Vocalist of the Year — Anne Murray
- Country Group or Duo of the Year — Family Brown

=== Academy of Country Music ===
- Entertainer of the Year — Alabama
- Song of the Year — "Lost in the Fifties Tonight", Fred Parris, Mike Reid and Troy Seals (Performer: Ronnie Milsap)
- Single of the Year — "Highwayman", The Highwaymen
- Album of the Year — Does Fort Worth Ever Cross Your Mind, George Strait
- Top Male Vocalist — George Strait
- Top Female Vocalist — Reba McEntire
- Top Vocal Duo — The Judds
- Top Vocal Group — Alabama
- Top New Male Vocalist — Randy Travis
- Top New Female Vocalist — Judy Rodman
- Video of the Year — "Who's Gonna Fill Their Shoes?", George Jones (Directors: Marc Ball)

=== Canadian Country Music Association ===
- Entertainer of the Year — Dick Damron
- Male Artist of the Year — Terry Carisse
- Female Artist of the Year — Carroll Baker
- Group of the Year — The Mercey Brothers
- SOCAN Song of the Year — "Counting the I Love You's", Terry Carisse, Bruce Rawlins (Performer: Terry Carisse)
- Single of the Year — "Riding on the Wind", Gary Fjellgaard
- Album of the Year — Closest Thing to You, Terry Carisse
- Top Selling Album — Once Upon a Christmas, Dolly Parton & Kenny Rogers
- Vista Rising Star Award — Ginny Mitchell
- Duo of the Year — Anita Perras and Tim Taylor

=== Country Music Association ===
- Entertainer of the Year — Ricky Skaggs
- Song of the Year — "God Bless the USA", Lee Greenwood (Performer: Lee Greenwood)
- Single of the Year — "Why Not Me", The Judds
- Album of the Year — Does Fort Worth Ever Cross Your Mind, George Strait
- Male Vocalist of the Year — George Strait
- Female Vocalist of the Year — Reba McEntire
- Vocal Duo of the Year — Dave Loggins and Anne Murray
- Vocal Group of the Year — The Judds
- Horizon Award — Sawyer Brown
- Music Video of the Year — "All My Rowdy Friends Are Coming Over Tonight", Hank Williams Jr. (Director: John Goodhue)
- Instrumentalist of the Year — Chet Atkins
- Instrumental Group of the Year — Ricky Skaggs Band

== See also ==
- Country Music Association
- Inductees of the Country Music Hall of Fame
