= List of RPM number-one country singles of 1985 =

These are the Canadian number-one country songs of 1985, per the RPM Country Tracks chart.

| Issue date | Title | Artist |
|---|---|---|
| January 5 | She's My Rock | George Jones |
| January 12 | The Best Year of My Life | Eddie Rabbitt |
| January 19 | Something in My Heart | Ricky Skaggs |
| January 26 | Something in My Heart | Ricky Skaggs |
| February 2 | Me Against the Night | Crystal Gayle |
| February 9 | A Place to Fall Apart | Merle Haggard featuring Janie Fricke |
| February 16 | (There's A) Fire in the Night | Alabama |
| February 23 | Ain't She Somethin' Else | Conway Twitty |
| March 2 | Baby's Got Her Blue Jeans On | Mel McDaniel |
| March 9 | Make My Life With You | The Oak Ridge Boys |
| March 16 | Baby Bye Bye | Gary Morris |
| March 23 | Crazy For Your Love | Exile |
| March 30 | Seven Spanish Angels | Ray Charles with Willie Nelson |
| April 6 | What I Didn't Do | Steve Wariner |
| April 13 | Crazy | Kenny Rogers |
| April 20 | Time Don't Run Out on Me | Anne Murray |
| April 27 | Honor Bound | Earl Thomas Conley |
| May 4 | Country Girls | John Schneider |
| May 11 | Girls' Night Out | The Judds |
| May 18 | Step That Step | Sawyer Brown |
| May 25 | Radio Heart | Charly McClain |
| June 1 | In a New York Minute | Ronnie McDowell |
| June 8 | Fallin' in Love | Sylvia |
| June 15 | Don't Call Him a Cowboy | Conway Twitty |
| June 22 | Country Boy | Ricky Skaggs |
| June 29 | She's a Miracle | Exile |
| July 6 | Little Things | The Oak Ridge Boys |
| July 13 | She Keeps the Home Fires Burning | Ronnie Milsap |
| July 20 | Forgiving You Was Easy | Willie Nelson |
| July 27 | Love Don't Care (Whose Heart It Breaks) | Earl Thomas Conley |
| August 3 | Dixie Road | Lee Greenwood |
| August 10 | Old Hippie | The Bellamy Brothers |
| August 17 | 40 Hour Week (For a Livin') | Alabama |
| August 24 | Highwayman | Waylon Jennings, Willie Nelson, Kris Kristofferson and Johnny Cash |
| August 31 | Real Love | Kenny Rogers with Dolly Parton |
| September 7 | Love Is Alive | The Judds |
| September 14 | I Don't Know Why You Don't Want Me | Rosanne Cash |
| September 21 | I Don't Know Why You Don't Want Me | Rosanne Cash |
| September 28 | Used to Blue | Sawyer Brown |
| October 5 | I Don't Know Why You Don't Want Me | Rosanne Cash |
| October 12 | Lost in the Fifties Tonight (In the Still of the Night) | Ronnie Milsap |
| October 19 | Lost in the Fifties Tonight (In the Still of the Night) | Ronnie Milsap |
| October 26 | You Make Me Want to Make You Mine | Juice Newton |
| November 2 | Touch a Hand, Make a Friend | The Oak Ridge Boys |
| November 9 | Some Fools Never Learn | Steve Wariner |
| November 16 | Can't Keep a Good Man Down | Alabama |
| November 23 | Hang On to Your Heart | Exile |
| November 30 | I'll Never Stop Loving You | Gary Morris |
| December 7 | Too Much on My Heart | The Statler Brothers |
| December 14 | I Don't Mind the Thorns (If You're the Rose) | Lee Greenwood |
| December 21 | The Chair | George Strait |
| December 28 | Nobody Falls Like a Fool | Earl Thomas Conley |

== See also ==
- 1985 in music
- List of number-one country hits of 1985 (U.S.)
