= List of Hot Country Singles number ones of 1985 =

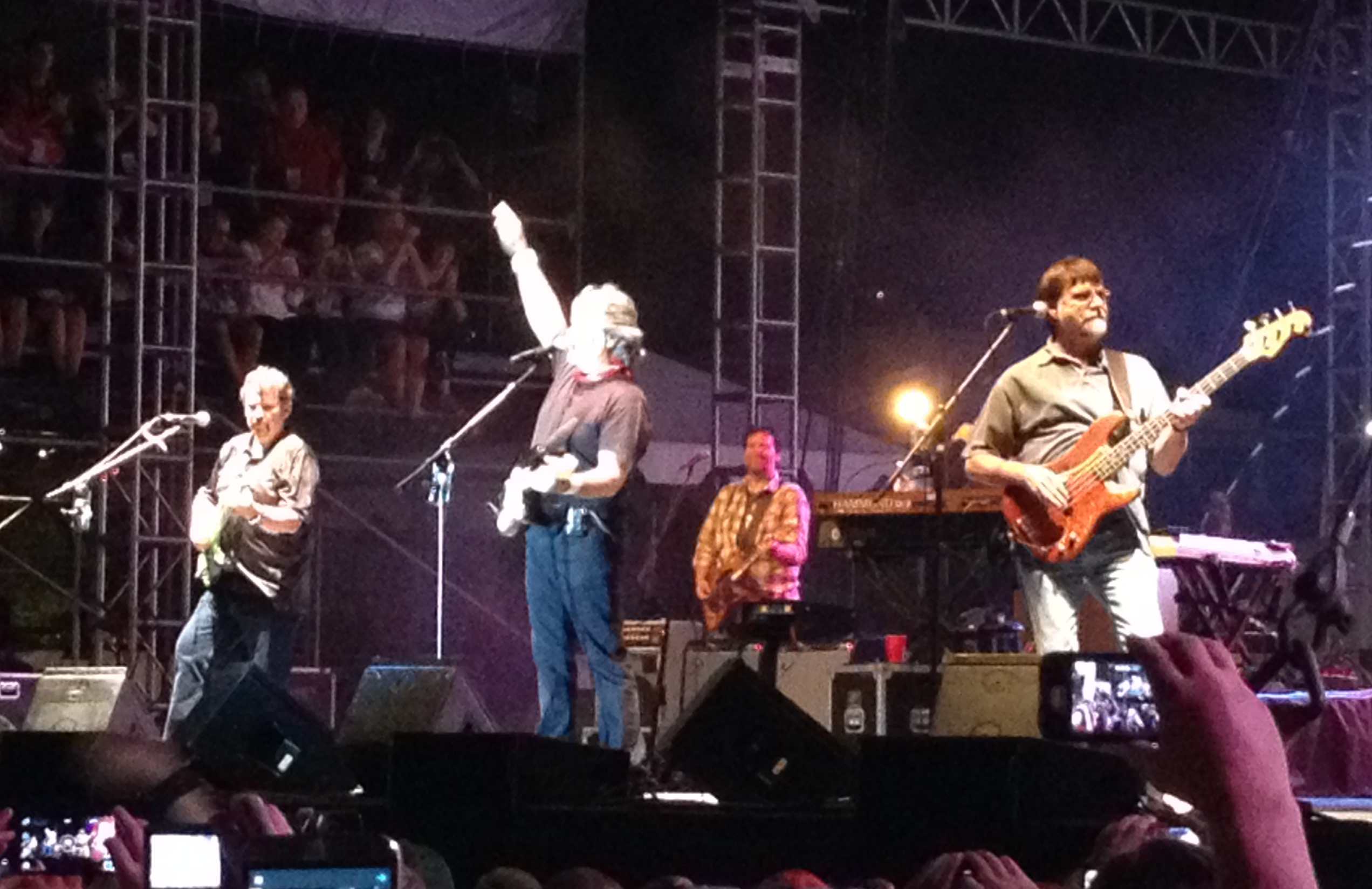
The band Alabama had four number ones in 1985.

Hot Country Songs is a chart that ranks the top-performing country music songs in the United States, published by Billboard magazine. In 1985, 51 different songs topped the chart, then published under the title Hot Country Singles, in 52 issues of the magazine, based on playlists submitted by country music radio stations and sales reports submitted by stores. Only "Lost in the Fifties Tonight (In the Still of the Night)" by Ronnie Milsap managed a second week at the top of the chart.

Alabama, one of the most successful bands in country music history, had the highest number of chart-toppers by a single act in 1985, with four: "(There's A) Fire in the Night", "There's No Way", "40 Hour Week (For a Livin')" and "Can't Keep a Good Man Down". When the group achieved its third number one of the year in August, Billboard regarded it as Alabama's seventeenth consecutive Hot Country number one, breaking the record for consecutive chart-toppers previously held by Sonny James. Alabama had released a Christmas single in late 1982 which only peaked at number 35, but the magazine disregarded this for the purposes of the band's number one streak, stating "only a Scrooge would count that against them". The band would eventually extend its streak of consecutive number ones to 21 before its popularity began to wane in the 1990s. Earl Thomas Conley, Exile, the Judds and the Oak Ridge Boys each had three number ones in 1985. Additionally Willie Nelson achieved one solo number one, one in collaboration with Ray Charles, and one as a member of the supergroup the Highwaymen, in which he was joined by Johnny Cash, Waylon Jennings and Kris Kristofferson.

Having appeared regularly on the Hot Country chart since 1976, Mel McDaniel achieved his first and only number one in 1985 with "Baby's Got Her Blue Jeans On". Ray Charles also topped the chart for the only time in 1985. Although he was far more associated with the soul and rhythm and blues genres during his lengthy career, Charles placed several songs on the country chart during the mid-1980s. He went all the way to the top spot with the Willie Nelson collaboration "Seven Spanish Angels", taken from the album Friendship, on which Charles duetted with a range of contemporary country singers. Gary Morris and Sawyer Brown were also first-time chart-toppers in 1985, with "Baby Bye Bye" and "Step That Step" respectively. "Have Mercy" by The Judds was the final number one of the year.

== Chart history ==
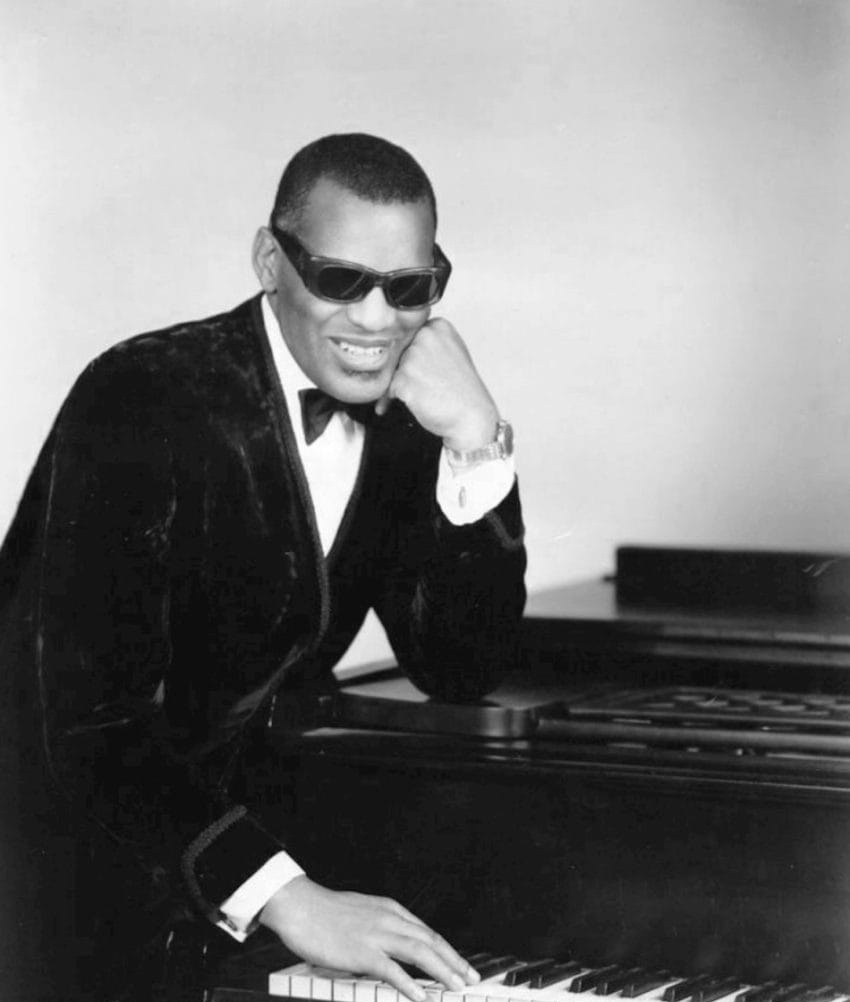
Ray Charles was more associated with the soul and rhythm and blues genres, but in 1985 he had a number one on the country chart.

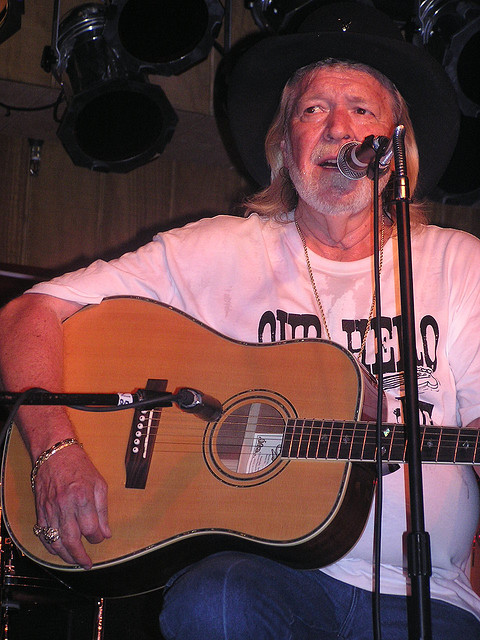
Mel McDaniel had his only number one in 1985.

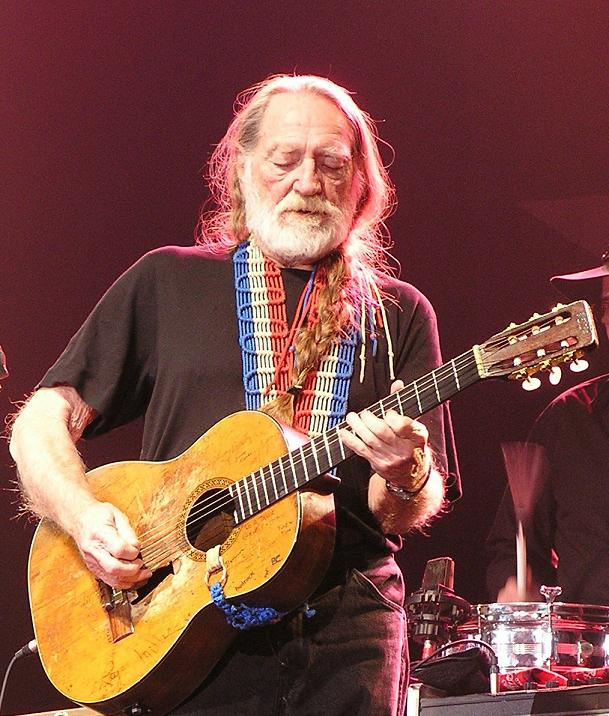
Willie Nelson had one solo number one, one in collaboration with Ray Charles, and one as part of supergroup The Highwaymen.

Issue date	Title	Artist(s)	Ref.
January 5	"Does Fort Worth Ever Cross Your Mind"	George Strait	
January 12	"The Best Year of My Life"	Eddie Rabbitt	
January 19	"How Blue"	Reba McEntire	
January 26	"(There's A) Fire in the Night"	Alabama	
February 2	"A Place to Fall Apart"	Merle Haggard	
February 9	"Ain't She Somethin' Else"	Conway Twitty	
February 16	"Make My Life with You"	The Oak Ridge Boys	
February 23	"Baby's Got Her Blue Jeans On"	Mel McDaniel	
March 2	"Baby Bye Bye"	Gary Morris	
March 9	"My Only Love"	The Statler Brothers	
March 16	"Crazy for Your Love"	Exile	
March 23	"Seven Spanish Angels"	Ray Charles (with Willie Nelson)	
March 30	"Crazy"	Kenny Rogers	
April 6	"Country Girls"	John Schneider	
April 13	"Honor Bound"	Earl Thomas Conley	
April 20	"I Need More of You"	The Bellamy Brothers	
April 27	"Girls' Night Out"	The Judds	
May 4	"There's No Way"	Alabama	
May 11	"Somebody Should Leave"	Reba McEntire	
May 18	"Step That Step"	Sawyer Brown	
May 25	"Radio Heart"	Charly McClain	
June 1	"Don't Call Him a Cowboy"	Conway Twitty	
June 8	"Natural High"	Merle Haggard	
June 15	"Country Boy"	Ricky Skaggs	
June 22	"Little Things"	The Oak Ridge Boys	
June 29	"She Keeps the Home Fires Burning"	Ronnie Milsap	
July 6	"She's a Miracle"	Exile	
July 13	"Forgiving You Was Easy"	Willie Nelson	
July 20	"Dixie Road"	Lee Greenwood	
July 27	"Love Don't Care (Whose Heart It Breaks)"	Earl Thomas Conley	
August 3	"40 Hour Week (For a Livin')"	Alabama	
August 10	"I'm for Love"	Hank Williams Jr.	
August 17	"Highwayman"	The Highwaymen	
August 24	"Real Love"	Dolly Parton (duet with Kenny Rogers)	
August 31	"Love Is Alive"	The Judds	
September 7	"I Don't Know Why You Don't Want Me"	Rosanne Cash	
September 14	"Modern Day Romance"	Nitty Gritty Dirt Band	
September 21	"I Fell in Love Again Last Night"	The Forester Sisters	
September 28	"Lost in the Fifties Tonight (In the Still of the Night)"	Ronnie Milsap	
October 5	"Lost in the Fifties Tonight (In the Still of the Night)"	Ronnie Milsap	
October 12	"Meet Me in Montana"	Marie Osmond (with Dan Seals)	
October 19	"You Make Me Want to Make You Mine"	Juice Newton	
October 26	"Touch a Hand, Make a Friend"	The Oak Ridge Boys	
November 2	"Some Fools Never Learn"	Steve Wariner	
November 9	"Can't Keep a Good Man Down"	Alabama	
November 16	"Hang On to Your Heart"	Exile	
November 23	"I'll Never Stop Loving You"	Gary Morris	
November 30	"Too Much on My Heart"	The Statler Brothers	
December 7	"I Don't Mind the Thorns (If You're the Rose)"	Lee Greenwood	
December 14	"Nobody Falls Like a Fool"	Earl Thomas Conley	
December 21	"The Chair"	George Strait	
December 28	"Have Mercy"	The Judds	

== See also ==
- 1985 in music
- List of artists who reached number one on the U.S. country chart
