= List of Top Country Albums number ones of 1985 =

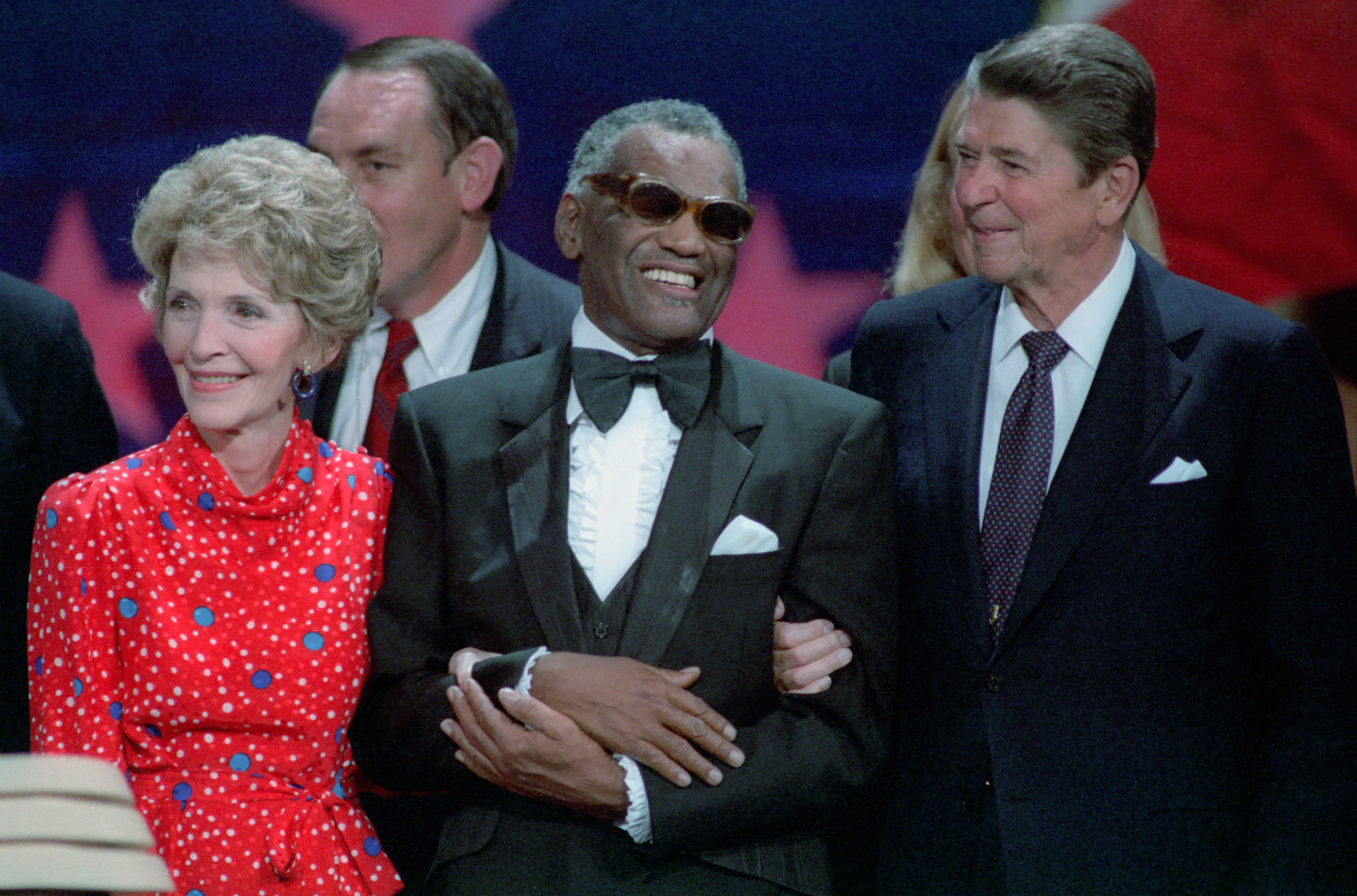
Ray Charles (center, pictured in 1984 with then-President Ronald Reagan and First Lady Nancy Reagan) was more associated with the soul and rhythm and blues genres, but in 1985 he had a number one on the country chart.

Top Country Albums is a chart that ranks the top-performing country music albums in the United States, published by Billboard. In 1985, 14 different albums topped the chart, based on sales reports submitted by a representative sample of stores nationwide.

In the issue of Billboard dated January 5, the band Exile was at number one with the album Kentucky Hearts, its third week in the top spot. Two weeks later it was replaced by Does Fort Worth Ever Cross Your Mind by George Strait, who was the only act with more than one number one during the year; he returned to the peak position in December with Something Special. The band Alabama's album 40-Hour Week had both the longest unbroken run at number one and the highest total number of weeks in the top spot; it spent 12 consecutive weeks atop the chart from March to June and then returned to the top spot for two further weeks in August. In March Ray Charles achieved his first number-one country album with Friendship. Although he was far more associated with the soul and rhythm and blues genres during his lengthy career, Charles had several entries on the country albums chart in the mid-1980s, including Friendship, on which he duetted with a range of contemporary country singers.

Several other acts reached number one for the first time in 1985, beginning with the Judds, who topped the chart in February with their second chart entry, Why Not Me. The pair would go on to be one of the most successful country acts of the 1980s before Naomi Judd, the elder member of the mother-daughter duo, was forced to retire due to a serious illness. The Judds were among a number of 1985's chart-topping acts, along with George Strait and Ricky Skaggs, to be identified with the neotraditional country trend, which moved away from the pop music-influenced style which had dominated the country charts in the earlier part of the decade in favour of a sound closer to the genre's roots. In October the Statler Brothers, who had first entered the chart in 1966, spent the only week of their career at number one when the album Pardners in Rhyme reached the top spot for a single week. In December, Gary Morris likewise spent his only week atop the chart with Anything Goes. It was displaced by the year's final number one, The Heart of the Matter by Kenny Rogers, in the issue of Billboard dated December 28. Rogers' album would go on to spend a total of six weeks at number one but would prove to be the last of the 11 chart-toppers which the singer achieved in his lifetime; he would top the chart again in 2020 shortly after his death.

== Chart history ==
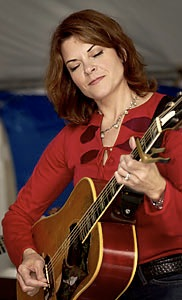
Rhythm & Romance was a number one for Rosanne Cash.

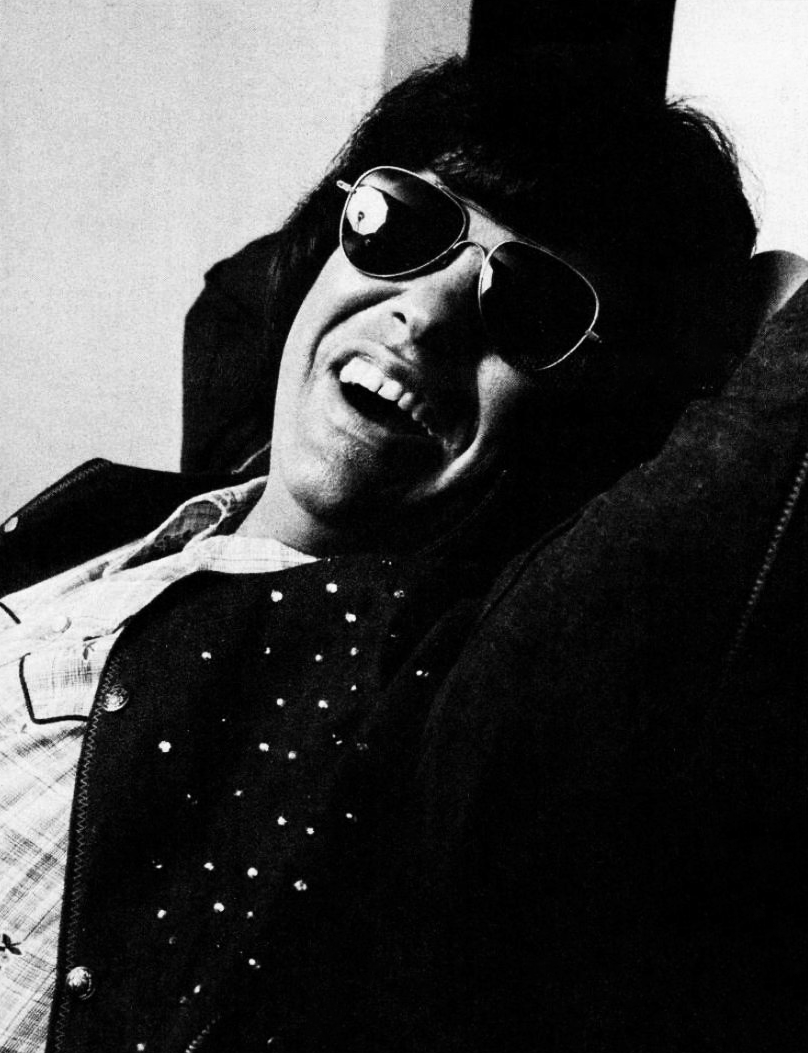
Ronnie Milsap topped the chart with the compilation album Greatest Hits, Vol. 2.

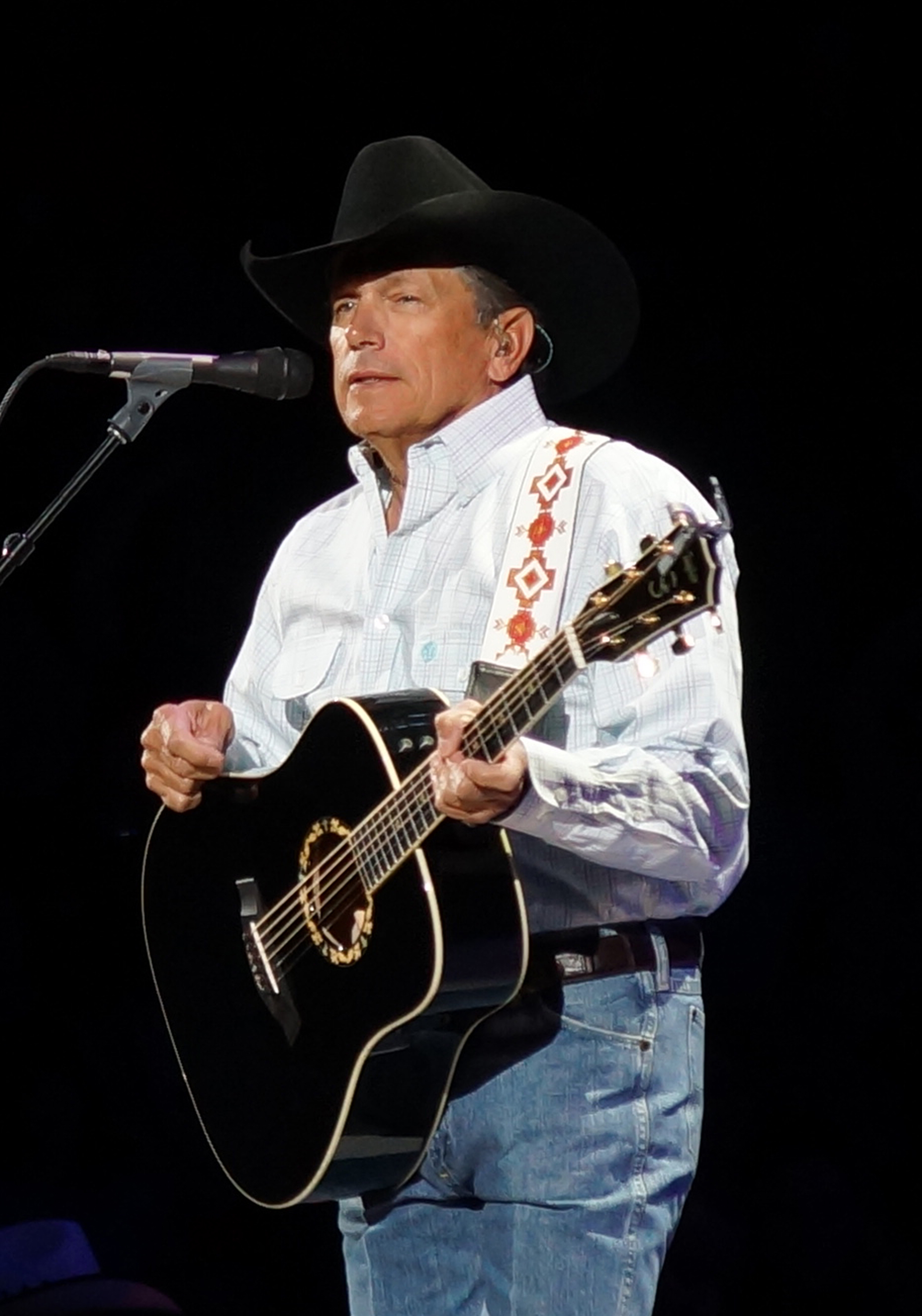
George Strait topped the chart with both Does Fort Worth Ever Cross Your Mind and Something Special.

Issue date	Title	Artist(s)	Ref.
January 5	Kentucky Hearts	Exile	
January 12	Kentucky Hearts	Exile	
January 19	Does Fort Worth Ever Cross Your Mind	George Strait	
January 26	Does Fort Worth Ever Cross Your Mind	George Strait	
February 2	Why Not Me	The Judds	
February 9	Why Not Me	The Judds	
February 16	Why Not Me	The Judds	
February 23	Country Boy	Ricky Skaggs	
March 2	Country Boy	Ricky Skaggs	
March 9	Country Boy	Ricky Skaggs	
March 16	Does Fort Worth Ever Cross Your Mind	George Strait	
March 23	Friendship	Ray Charles	
March 30	40-Hour Week	Alabama	
April 6	40-Hour Week	Alabama	
April 13	40-Hour Week	Alabama	
April 20	40-Hour Week	Alabama	
April 27	40-Hour Week	Alabama	
May 4	40-Hour Week	Alabama	
May 11	40-Hour Week	Alabama	
May 18	40-Hour Week	Alabama	
May 25	40-Hour Week	Alabama	
June 1	40-Hour Week	Alabama	
June 8	40-Hour Week	Alabama	
June 15	40-Hour Week	Alabama	
June 22	Five-O	Hank Williams Jr.	
June 29	Five-O	Hank Williams Jr.	
July 6	Five-O	Hank Williams Jr.	
July 13	Five-O	Hank Williams Jr.	
July 20	Five-O	Hank Williams Jr.	
July 27	Five-O	Hank Williams Jr.	
August 3	40-Hour Week	Alabama	
August 10	40-Hour Week	Alabama	
August 17	Five-O	Hank Williams Jr.	
August 24	Five-O	Hank Williams Jr.	
August 31	Five-O	Hank Williams Jr.	
September 7	Greatest Hits, Vol. 2	Ronnie Milsap	
September 14	Greatest Hits, Vol. 2	Ronnie Milsap	
September 21	Greatest Hits, Vol. 2	Ronnie Milsap	
September 28	Highwayman	The Highwaymen	
October 5	Greatest Hits, Vol. 2	Ronnie Milsap	
October 12	Greatest Hits, Vol. 2	Ronnie Milsap	
October 19	Pardners in Rhyme	The Statler Brothers	
October 26	Greatest Hits, Vol. 2	Ronnie Milsap	
November 2	Greatest Hits, Vol. 2	Ronnie Milsap	
November 9	Greatest Hits, Vol. 2	Ronnie Milsap	
November 16	Greatest Hits, Vol. 2	Ronnie Milsap	
November 23	Greatest Hits, Vol. 2	Ronnie Milsap	
November 30	Greatest Hits, Vol. 2	Ronnie Milsap	
December 7	Rhythm & Romance	Rosanne Cash	
December 14	Something Special	George Strait	
December 21	Anything Goes	Gary Morris	
December 28	The Heart of the Matter	Kenny Rogers	
