= Country Boy =

Country Boy, another term for cowboy, may refer to:

== Literature ==
- The Country Boy, a play by Edgar Selwyn
- The Country Boy (play), a play by John Murphy

== Film ==
- The Country Boy (film), a 1915 American comedy silent film
- Country Boy (1935 film), a Merrie Melodies animated short film
- Country Boy (1966 film), starring Randy Boone as country music singer

== Music ==
- Country Boy (Bobby Vinton album), 1966
- Country Boy (Daniel O'Donnell album), 2008
- "Country Boy," a 1949 song by Little Jimmy Dickens
- "Country Boy (You Got Your Feet in L.A.)", a 1975 song by Glen Campbell
- "Country Boy", a 1963 song by Heinz
- "Country Boy" (Aaron Lewis song), 2011
- "Country Boy" (Alan Jackson song), 2008
- "Country Boy", a song by Jimmy Nail, used as the theme to the 1996 British television series Crocodile Shoes II
- "Country Boy", a 1971 song by Heads Hands & Feet (later covered by Ricky Skaggs)
- Country Boy (Ricky Skaggs album), 1985
  - "Country Boy" (Ricky Skaggs song), originally recorded by Heads Hands & Feet
- "I'm Just a Country Boy", a 1977 song by Don Williams
- "Thank God I'm a Country Boy", a 1974/1975 song by John Denver that is also called "Country Boy"

== See also ==
- Country Boys, a 2006 documentary film
