= 40-hour week (disambiguation) =

The 40-hour week movement, or eight-hour day movement, was a social movement to regulate the length of a working day.

40-hour week may also refer to:

== Labor law and history ==
- Forty-Hour Week Convention, 1935, International Labour Organization Convention
- Labour law, including regulation of working time
- Working time, the period of time that a person spends at paid labor
- Workweek and weekend#Length

== Music ==
- 40-Hour Week, an album by Alabama
  - "40 Hour Week (For a Livin')", the title song
