= The Tune Weavers =

American vocal group

- Also known as: The Tone Weavers
- Origin: Woburn, Massachusetts, United States
- Genres: R&B, doo-wop, jazz
- Years active: 1957–1964 occasionally in later years
- Labels: Casa Grande, Checker Records, Ember
- Members: Charlotte Davis Rose; Alice Fernandes; Burt Pina
- Past members: Margo Lopez Sylvia; Gilbert J. "Gil" Lopez; William "Bunky" Morris Jr.: John Sylvia

The Tune Weavers were an American vocal group formed in 1957. They had a US top ten hit in 1957 with "Happy, Happy Birthday Baby". After first splitting up in 1962, the group has continued to perform with two original members.

== Career ==
The group formed in Woburn, Massachusetts, and originally comprised lead singer Margo Sylvia (born Margo Lopez, 4 April 1936 – 25 October 1991); tenor Gilbert J. "Gil" Lopez (4 July 1934 – 3 July 1998); bass singer John Sylvia (b. 4 September 1935-April 12, 2023); and obligato Charlotte Davis (b. 12 November 1936). Margo and Gil, who were sister and brother, sang as a jazz and pop duo together in clubs, before being joined in 1956 by Margo's husband John, and her cousin Charlotte, to form the group. They were originally called the Tone Weavers before they were mistakenly announced as the Tune Weavers, and the new name stuck.

The group came to the attention of former band leader Frank Paul, and in March 1957 they recorded a song, "Happy, Happy Birthday Baby", that Margo and Gil had written together in 1952. The record was issued on Paul's own label, Casa Grande, but was not a success at first. However, a few months later it began to be played by radio DJs in Philadelphia. It was promoted by Dick Clark, and Chess Records in Chicago then bought the national distribution rights, and released it on their subsidiary label Checker Records. The record entered both the Billboard pop and R&B charts in September 1957, reaching no. 5 on the pop chart and no. 4 on the R&B chart.

The group appeared in an Alan Freed rock and roll concert in Brooklyn, New York, and later went on national package tours with The Everly Brothers, Buddy Holly and the Crickets, Eddie Cochran, Paul Anka, Roy Hamilton, The Clovers, and others. They released several more records on the Casa Grande label, distributed by Ember Records, including "I Remember Dear", but none of their later releases made the charts. Charlotte Davis left the group in 1960, and was replaced by William "Bunky" Morris Jr.. They continued to record until 1964, but then broke up.

The group reassembled for some performances in the 1970s, and Margo Sylvia recorded under the Tune Weavers name in the late 1980s. Following her death in 1991, and that of Gil Lopez in 1998, John Sylvia and Charlotte Davis (now Charlotte Davis Rose) joined new group members Alice Fernandes and Burt Pina to do shows, and the group was inducted into the Doo Wop Hall of Fame in 2003.

John Sylvia died on April 13, 2023
