= How Do I Turn You On =

Single by Ronnie Milsap

from the album Lost in the Fifties Tonight
- B-side: "Don't Take It Tonight"
- Released: October 1986
- Genre: Country
- Length: 4:45
- Label: RCA Victor
- Songwriters: Robert Byrne; Mike Reid
- Producers: Ronnie Milsap, Rob Galbraith, Tom Collins

Ronnie Milsap singles chronology
"In Love" (1986)	"How Do I Turn You On" (1986)	"Snap Your Fingers" (1987)

"How Do I Turn You On" is a song written by Mike Reid and Robert Byrne, and recorded by the American country music singer Ronnie Milsap. It was released in October 1986 as the fourth single from the album Lost in the Fifties Tonight. The song was Milsap's thirtieth number one country single, spending one week at number one and thirteen weeks on the country chart.

== Charts ==
Chart (1986–1987)	Peak position
US Hot Country Songs (Billboard)	1
Canadian RPM Country Tracks	1
