= Here I Am Drunk Again =

Studio album by Moe Bandy
- Released: 1976
- Genre: Country
- Length: 24:15
- Label: Columbia
- Producer: Ray Baker

Moe Bandy chronology
Hank Williams, You Wrote My Life (1976)	Here I Am Drunk Again (1976)	I'm Sorry for You My Friend (1977)

Here I Am Drunk Again is the fifth album by country singer Moe Bandy, released in 1976 on the Columbia label recorded at Columbia Recording Studios, Nashville, Tennessee.

== Track listing ==
No.	Title	Writer(s)	Length
1.	"Here I Am Drunk Again"	Autry Inman; Jack Kay	2:27
2.	"If I Had Someone To Cheat On"	J. R. Cochran	2:10
3.	"What Happened To Our Love"	Sanger D. Shafer; Moe Bandy	2:20
4.	"The Bottle's Holdin' Me"	Shafer	2:30
5.	"Please Take Her Home"	Eddy Raven	2:40
6.	"Mind Your Own Business"	Hank Williams	2:40
7.	"She Took More Than Her Share"	Shafer	2:22
8.	"She's Got That Oklahoma Look"	Shafer	1:53
9.	"Then You Can Let Me Go (Out Of Your Mind)"	Steve Collom	2:30
10.	"The Man That You Once Knew"	Dallas Frazier	2:43
Total length:			24:15

- "Here I Am Drunk Again" was written by Autry Inman and Jack Kay, but was erroneously credited to Clyde Beavers and Don Warden in the liner notes.

== Musicians ==
- Bob Moore
- Leo Jackson
- Kenny Malone
- Johnny Gimble
- Weldon Myrick
- Hargus "Pig" Robbins
- Charlie McCoy (Courtesy of Monument Records)
- Dave Kirby
- Bobby Thompson
- Ray Edenton
- Jerry Carrigan
- Leon Rhodes
- Henry Strzelecki
- Shane Keister

== Backing ==
- The Jordanaires
- The Nashville Edition

== Production ==
- Sound engineers - Lou Bradley, Ron Reynolds
- Photography - Jim McGuire
- Album design - Bill Barnes

== Charts ==
Chart performance for Here I Am Drunk Again
Chart (1976)	Peak position
US Top Country Albums (Billboard)	17
