= Happy, Happy Birthday Baby =

1957 single by The Tune Weavers

Single by The Tune Weavers
- B-side: "Ol' Man River"
- Released: July 1957
- Recorded: 1957
- Length: 2:22
- Label: Casa Grande (Boston, Massachusetts); Checker (rest of the United States)
- Songwriters: Margo Sylvia, Gilbert Lopez

"Happy, Happy Birthday Baby"

Single by Ronnie Milsap

from the album Lost in the Fifties Tonight
- B-side: "I'll Take Care of You"
- Released: March 8, 1986
- Genre: Country
- Length: 3:39
- Label: RCA Victor
- Songwriters: Margo Sylvia, Gilbert Lopez
- Producers: Ronnie Milsap, Rob Galbraith, Tom Collins

Ronnie Milsap singles chronology
"Lost in the Fifties Tonight (In the Still of the Night)" (1985)	"Happy, Happy Birthday Baby" (1986)	"In Love" (1986)

"Happy, Happy Birthday Baby" is a 1957 song written by Margo Sylvia & Gilbert Lopez. "Happy, Happy Birthday Baby" was originally performed by The Tune Weavers, who had their only hit with this song. Both Margo Sylvia and Gilbert Lopez were members of The Tune Weavers. The single went to number four on the R&B chart and went to number five on the Hot 100. The B-side of "Happy, Happy Birthday Baby, was The Tune Weavers version of "Ol' Man River".

The inspiration for the song came from Margo's then-boyfriend, Donald Clements, who was a member of a group called the Sophomores. When he broke up with her, Margo came up with the lyrics to express how she wanted to stay with him. "The words came so easily. It was real," she recounted to Wayne Jancik in The Billboard Book of One-Hit Wonders. Margo and the rest of the Tune Weavers recorded it and "Ol' Man River" in an 18-hour session on March 7, 1957, in Boston, with Margo eight months pregnant. Seven months later, the song reached its peak of popularity in the United States. The Pennsylvania girl group the Pixies Three included the song on their "Party With The Pixies Three" Album in early 1964.

Based on the similarities in melody, "Happy, Happy Birthday Baby" appears to have inspired two future Top 20 hits. "I'm On The Outside (Looking In)" by Little Anthony and the Imperials (#15 1964) appears inspired by the main tune of this song, and "Wasted Days and Wasted Nights" by Freddy Fender (#8 1975) appears inspired by the chorus of this song.

The track was originally released on the Casa Grande label. It was later re-released on the Checker label, but this later version omitted the final four saxophone notes (at the coda) which were part of the song's signature.

Dodie Stevens recorded a Christmas variation of the song called "Merry Christmas Baby" in 1960. In 1988, Margo Sylvia herself recorded a cover of this version called "Merry Merry Christmas Baby" for Classic Records. It was included on the Ultimate Christmas Album by Collectables Records.

== Cover versions ==
- Dolly Parton covered the song in 1965, and it became her first charting single, though it peaked at only #8 on the Bubbling Under Hot 100 chart; in 1982, a duet recording of the song was included on the album The Winning Hand, featuring Parton and Willie Nelson (though the recording featured Parton's original 1965 vocals, with new vocals from Nelson edited in to create a "duet").
- Sandy Posey hit #36 on the country charts with a remake in 1971.
- In 1986, Ronnie Milsap had his twenty-eighth number one on the country chart with his version of the song.
- Wanda Jackson performed the song for her 1958 eponymous debut album. In 1960, it was released as a single but did not chart.
- Rosie & the Originals released a previously unreleased version on their 2000 album The Best of Rosie & the Originals.
- Elvis Presley's private recording of the song, at a home in Waco, Texas, in May 1958, can be found in some albums, including Elvis' listening and "rehearsals" getting ready to sing Happy, Happy Birthday Baby himself. (Off Duty With Privat Presley) (Private Home Recordings - Eddie Fadal Residence, Waco Texas - May 1958)

== Chart performance ==
Chart (1986)	Peak position
US Hot Country Songs (Billboard)	1
Canadian RPM Country Tracks	1

== In other media ==
- The song replaced "16 Candles" in the 1997 reissue of the 1972 film, Pink Flamingos
- The song is sung by Michael Shannon in season 1 episode 5 of the Hulu original Nine Perfect Strangers
- The song is played in season 1 of The Morning Show
- A version of this song was used in the Mighty Morphin Power Rangers episode Happy Birthday, Zack
