= In Love (Ronnie Milsap song) =

Single by Ronnie Milsap

from the album Lost in the Fifties Tonight
- B-side: "Old Fashioned Girl Like You"
- Released: June 1986
- Recorded: 1985
- Genre: Country, pop
- Length: 4:34
- Label: RCA Records
- Songwriters: Bruce Dees; Mike Reid
- Producers: Ronnie Milsap, Rob Galbraith, Tom Collins

Ronnie Milsap singles chronology
"Happy, Happy Birthday Baby" (1986)	"In Love" (1986)	"How Do I Turn You On" (1986)

"In Love" is a song written by Mike Reid and Bruce Dees, and recorded by American country music artist Ronnie Milsap. It was released in June 1986 as the third single from the album Lost in the Fifties Tonight.

== Success and reception ==
The song was Milsap's 44th single to be released, and his 29th No. 1 hit on the Billboard country chart. The song came during the peak of his success as country music singer as it was part of an uninterrupted string of several No. 1 hits to his credit.

The song was also one of several songs written by songwriter Reid which became major hits for Milsap.

== Chart positions ==
Chart (1986)	Peak position
U.S. Billboard Hot Country Singles & Tracks	1
Canadian RPM Country Tracks	1
