= I'm Sorry for You My Friend =

Studio album by Moe Bandy
- Released: 1977
- Genre: Country
- Label: Columbia
- Producer: Ray Baker

Moe Bandy chronology
Here I Am Drunk Again (1976)	I'm Sorry for You My Friend (1977)	The Best (1977)

Professional ratings
Review scores
Source	Rating
AllMusic	3.5/5 stars
The Rolling Stone Record Guide	3/5 stars

I'm Sorry for You My Friend is an album by the American musician Moe Bandy, released in 1977 on the Columbia label. It was recorded at Columbia Recording Studio "B". The album peaked at No. 18 on Billboard's Top Country Albums chart. The title track is a cover of the Hank Williams song.

The track "Does Fort Worth Ever Cross Your Mind" would become a No. 1 hit for George Strait in 1984.

== Track listing ==
1. "I'm Sorry for You, My Friend" (H. Williams) - 2:22
2. "Someone That I Can Forget" (L. Hargrove/P. Drake) - 2:28
3. "The Lady from the Country (Of Eleven Hundred Springs)" (J. Jay/B. Evans) - 2:08
4. "So Much for You, So Much for Me" (L. Anderson) - 2:23
5. "All the Beer and All My Friends Are Gone" (B. Anderson/M. L. Turner) - 2:39
6. "A Four Letter Fool" (K. Jean) - 2:20
7. "High Inflation Blues" (S. Collom) - 1:55
8. "Does Fort Worth Ever Cross Your Mind" (S. D. Shafer/D. Shafer) - 2:12
9. "She's an Angel" (H. Howard/L. J. Dillon) - 1:54
10. "She's Everybody's Woman, I'm Nobody's Man" (S. D. Shafer/M. Bandy) - 2:33

== Musicians ==
- Leo Jackson
- Bob Moore
- Kenny Malone
- Johnny Gimble
- Weldon Myrick
- Hargus "Pig" Robbins
- Charlie McCoy
- Dave Kirby
- Bobby Thompson
- Ray Edenton
- Jerry Carrigan
- Henry Strzelecki
- Leon Rhodes
- Terry McMillan

Backing

- The Jordanaires
- The Nashville Edition

Production

- Sound Engineer - Lou Bradley
- Photography - Jim McGuire
- Design - Bill Barnes, Cheryl Pardue

== Charts ==
Chart (1977)	Peak position
US Top Country Albums	18
