= Leona (song) =

Single by Sawyer Brown

from the album Sawyer Brown
- B-side: "Staying Afloat"
- Released: October 6, 1984
- Genre: Country
- Length: 3:02
- Label: Capitol/Curb
- Songwriter(s): Bill Shore, David Wills
- Producer(s): Randy Scruggs

Sawyer Brown singles chronology
"Leona" (1984)	"Step That Step" (1985)

"Leona" is a debut song written by Bill Shore and David Wills, and recorded by American country music group Sawyer Brown. It was released in October 1984 as the first single from the album Sawyer Brown. The song reached #16 on the Billboard Hot Country Singles & Tracks chart.

== Chart performance ==
Chart (1984–1985)	Peak position
US Hot Country Songs (Billboard)	16
