= Between Blue Eyes and Jeans =

Single by Conway Twitty

from the album Don't Call Him a Cowboy
- B-side: "Baby's Gone"
- Released: July 6, 1985
- Genre: Country
- Length: 3:00
- Label: Warner Bros.
- Songwriter(s): Ken McDuffie
- Producer(s): Conway Twitty, Dee Henry, Ron Treat

Conway Twitty singles chronology
"Don't Call Him a Cowboy" (1985)	"Between Blue Eyes and Jeans" (1985)	"The Legend and the Man" (1985)

"Between Blue Eyes and Jeans" is a song written by Ken McDuffie, and recorded by American country music artist Conway Twitty. It was released in July 1985 as the second single from the album Don't Call Him a Cowboy. The song reached #3 on the Billboard Hot Country Singles & Tracks chart.

== Charts ==
=== Weekly charts ===
Chart (1985)	Peak position
US Hot Country Songs (Billboard)	3
Canadian RPM Country Tracks	7

=== Year-end charts ===
Chart (1985)	Position
US Hot Country Songs (Billboard)	50
