= Got No Reason Now for Goin' Home =

Single by Gene Watson

from the album Heartaches, Love & Stuff
- B-side: "A Memory Away"
- Released: October 13, 1984
- Genre: Country
- Length: 2:41
- Label: MCA
- Songwriter: Johnny Russell
- Producers: Russ Reeder, Gene Watson

Gene Watson singles chronology
"Little by Little" (1984)	"Got No Reason Now for Goin' Home" (1984)	"One Hell of a Heartache" (1985)

"Got No Reason Now for Goin' Home" is a song written by Johnny Russell, and recorded by American country music artist Gene Watson. It was released in October 1984 as the first single from the album Heartaches, Love & Stuff. The song reached #7 on the Billboard Hot Country Singles & Tracks chart.

== Chart performance ==
Chart (1984–1985)	Peak position
US Hot Country Songs (Billboard)	7
Canadian RPM Country Tracks	15
