= Don't Call Him a Cowboy (album) =

Studio album by Conway Twitty
- Released: March 1985
- Recorded: 1985
- Genre: Country
- Length: 32:21
- Label: Warner Bros. Records
- Producers: Conway Twitty, Dee Henry, Ron Treat

Conway Twitty chronology
Conway's Latest Greatest Hits Volume 1 (1984)	Don't Call Him a Cowboy (1985)	Chasin' Rainbows (1985)

Singles from Don't Call Him a Cowboy
- 1. "Don't Call Him a Cowboy" Released: February 1985; 2. "Between Blue Eyes and Jeans" Released: July 6, 1985

Don't Call Him a Cowboy is the forty-ninth studio album by American country music singer Conway Twitty. The album was released on June 15, 1985, by Warner Bros. Records.

== Track listing ==
No.	Title	Writer(s)	Length
1.	"Don't Call Him a Cowboy"	Debbie Hupp, Johnny MacRae, Bob Morrison	2:34
2.	"Somebody Lied"	Joe Chambers, Larry Jenkins	2:45
3.	"Between Blue Eyes and Jeans"	Ken McDuffie	2:59
4.	"The Note"	Buck Moore, Michele Ray	3:25
5.	"Whichever One Comes First"	Johnny MacRae, Steve Clark	3:08
6.	"Everyone Has Someone They Can't Forget"	Naomi Martin, Marty Yonts	3:30
7.	"Those Eyes"	Larry Byrom, Thom Schuyler, Paul Overstreet	3:24
8.	"Except for You"	Ben Peters	3:10
9.	"Green Eyes"	Kim Morrison, Mary Fiedler	3:16
10.	"Take It Like a Man"	K. Morrison, Scott Edward Phelps	4:05
Total length:			32:21

== Personnel ==
- Jimmy Capps - acoustic guitar
- Hoot Hester - fiddle
- John Hughey - steel guitar, dobro
- David Hungate - bass guitar
- Shane Keister - keyboards
- Larry Keith - background vocals
- Donna Rhodes - background vocals
- Perry Rhodes - background vocals
- James Stroud - drums, percussion
- Conway Twitty - lead vocals, background vocals
- Bobby Wood - keyboards
- Reggie Young - electric guitar

== Charts ==
=== Weekly charts ===
Chart (1985)	Peak position
US Top Country Albums (Billboard)	7

=== Year-end charts ===
Chart (1985)	Position
US Top Country Albums (Billboard)	30
