= Chasin' Rainbows =

Studio album by Conway Twitty
- Released: October 1985
- Recorded: 1985
- Genre: Country
- Length: 31:31
- Label: Warner Bros. Records
- Producers: Conway Twitty, Dee Henry, Ron Treat

Conway Twitty chronology
Don't Call Him a Cowboy (1985)	Chasin' Rainbows (1985)	Fallin' for You for Years (1986)

Singles from Chasin' Rainbows
- 1. "The Legend and the Man" Released: 1985; 2. "You'll Never Know How Much I Needed You Today" Released: 1985

Chasin' Rainbows is the fiftieth studio album by American country music singer Conway Twitty. The album was released in 1985, by Warner Bros. Records.

== Track listing ==
No.	Title	Writer(s)	Length
1.	"The Legend and the Man"	Ron Hellard, Curly Putman, Bucky Jones	3:58
2.	"All I Can Be Is a Sweet Memory"	Harlan Howard	3:35
3.	"Keep On Chasin' Rainbows"	Mitch Johnson, Kin Vassy	3:06
4.	"True True Love Never Dies"	Bobby Bare, Max D. Barnes	2:59
5.	"What's a Memory Like You (Doing in a Love Like This)"	Charles Quillen, John Jarrard	3:58
6.	"You'll Never Know How Much I Needed You Today"	Jan Carl Vinson, Jim Benton, Patricia E. Linthicum	3:15
7.	"Lay Me Down Carolina"	Rich Alves, Roger Murrah	2:44
8.	"She Did"	Dallas Cody	2:38
9.	"I'm the Man in the Song"	Conway Twitty, Joe Chambers, Larry Jenkins	2:12
10.	"Baby I'm-a Want You"	David Gates	3:06
Total length:			31:31

== Charts ==
Chart (1985)	Peak position
US Top Country Albums (Billboard)	29
