= The Cowboy Rides Away =

Single by George Strait

from the album Does Fort Worth Ever Cross Your Mind
- B-side: "Any Old Time"
- Released: January 14, 1985
- Recorded: June 26, 1984
- Genre: Country
- Length: 3:20
- Label: MCA 52526
- Songwriters: Sonny Throckmorton, Casey Kelly
- Producers: Jimmy Bowen & George Strait

George Strait singles chronology
"Does Fort Worth Ever Cross Your Mind" (1984)	"The Cowboy Rides Away" (1985)	"The Fireman" (1985)

"The Cowboy Rides Away" is a song written by Sonny Throckmorton and Casey Kelly, and recorded by American country music artist George Strait. It was released in January 1985 as the second single from his album Does Fort Worth Ever Cross Your Mind. It peaked at number 5 on the United States Billboard Hot Country Singles chart, and at number 3 on the RPM Country Tracks chart in Canada. It is the song used by Strait to close out his performances. This was also the name of his final tour that commenced on January 18, 2013.

It was the last song he sang at his final The Cowboy Rides Away Tour concert on June 7, 2014, at AT&T Stadium in Arlington, Texas with a worldwide record setting attendance for the show at 104,000.

== Content ==
The song is about a cowboy riding away from a failed relationship. He and his wife/girlfriend have been through it all and they just can not work things out.

== Cover versions ==
Country music duo Brooks & Dunn covered the song from the television special George Strait: ACM Artist of the Decade All Star Concert.

== Critical reception ==
Kevin John Coyne of Country Universe gave the song an A grade, calling it a song that "embraces the traditional cowboy mythos while simultaneously reinventing it."

== Chart positions ==
Chart (1985)	Peak position
US Hot Country Songs (Billboard)	5
Canadian RPM Country Tracks	3

== Certifications ==
Region	Certification	Certified units/sales
United States (RIAA)	Platinum	1,000,000^{‡}
^{‡} Sales+streaming figures based on certification alone.
