= Lost in the Fifties Tonight =

Studio album by Ronnie Milsap
- Released: 1986
- Studios: GroundStar Laboratories and Bullet Recording (Nashville, Tennessee)
- Genre: Country
- Length: 42:53
- Label: RCA
- Producers: Ronnie Milsap, Rob Galbraith; Tom Collins

Ronnie Milsap chronology
Greatest Hits, Vol. 2 (1985)	Lost in the Fifties Tonight (1986)	Christmas with Ronnie Milsap (1986)

Singles from Lost in the Fifties Tonight
- 1. "Happy, Happy Birthday Baby" Released: March 8, 1986; 2. "In Love" Released: June 1986; 3. "How Do I Turn You On" Released: October 1986

Professional ratings
Review scores
Source	Rating
Allmusic	3.5/5 stars

Lost in the Fifties Tonight is the seventeenth studio album by American country music artist Ronnie Milsap, released in 1986. The album produced four singles, all of which claimed the top spot on the Billboard country singles chart, including the title track, which was previously featured on Milsap's Second Greatest Hits Volume. The others included "Happy, Happy Birthday Baby", "In Love" and "How Do I Turn You On."

The album reached number one on Country charts and peaked at number 121 on the Billboard 200, later certified gold by the Recording Industry Association of America (RIAA). The album went out of print in 2005, but was re-released as a double album with 1987's Heart & Soul on May 8, 2012. On January 25, 2019, the majority of Milsap's catalogue was brought by Craft Recordings, which led it to be digitally reissued despite having its physical copies out of print.

== Track listing ==
No.	Title	Writer(s)	Length
1.	"Lost in the Fifties Tonight (In the Still of the Night)"	Mike Reid, Troy Seals, Fred Parris	4:18
2.	"In Love"	Reid, Bruce Dees	4:34
3.	"Old Fashioned Girl Like You"	Reid, Naomi Martin	3:21
4.	"I Heard It Through the Grapevine"	Norman Whitfield, Barrett Strong	4:24
5.	"Don't Take It Tonight"	Reid, Seals	5:10
6.	"How Do I Turn You On"	Reid, Robert Byrne	4:45
7.	"Happy, Happy Birthday Baby"	Margo Sylvia, Gilbert Lopez	3:41
8.	"Nashville Moon"	Roger Murrah, John Schweers	3:18
9.	"I Only Remember the Good Times"	Reid, Martin	4:00
10.	"Money (That's What I Want)"	Janice Bradford, Berry Gordy	5:21

== Personnel ==
As listed in liner notes.

- Ronnie Milsap – lead vocals, backing vocals, keyboards
- Brandon Barnes – synthesizers
- Mitch Humphries – keyboards
- Shane Keister – keyboards, synthesizers, synthesizer drum programming
- Mike Lawler – synthesizers
- Jay Spell – keyboards
- Larry Byrom – electric guitar
- Jimmy Capps – acoustic guitar
- Bruce Dees – electric guitar, backing vocals
- Jon Goin – electric guitar, acoustic guitar
- Sonny Garrish – steel guitar
- Bob Wray – bass guitar
- Larrie Londin – drums
- Roy Yeager – drums
- Farrell Morris – percussion
- Jim Horn – saxophone
- Bergen White – string arrangements, backing vocals
- Carl Gorodetzky – concertmaster
- The Nashville String Machine – strings
- Robert Byrne – backing vocals
- Lisa Silver – backing vocals
- Suzy Storm – backing vocals
- Wendy Suits – backing vocals
- Diane Tidwell – backing vocals
- Marie Tomlinson – backing vocals
- Dennis Wilson – backing vocals
- Barbara Wyrick – backing vocals

=== Production ===
- Tom Collins – producer
- Rob Galbraith – producer
- Ronnie Milsap – producer
- Ben Harris – engineer
- Kyle Lehning – engineer
- Randy Gardner – assistant engineer
- Scott Hendricks – string engineer
- Glenn Meadows – digital editing at Masterfonics (Nashville, Tennessee)
- Doug Sax – mastering at The Mastering Lab (Hollywood, California)
- Bill Brunt – art direction, design
- Greg Gorman – photography
- Jim Osborn – illustration
- Marie Shreve-Slayton – hair, make-up

== Charts ==
=== Weekly charts ===
Chart (1986)	Peak position
US Billboard 200	121
US Top Country Albums (Billboard)	1

=== Year-end charts ===
Chart (1986)	Position
US Top Country Albums (Billboard)	22

=== Singles ===
Year	Single	Peak positions			
Year	Single	US Country	US AC	CAN Country	CAN AC
1985	"Lost in the Fifties Tonight (In the Still of the Night)"	1	8	1	20
1986	"Happy, Happy Birthday Baby"	1	—	1	—
1986	"In Love"	1	—	1	—
1986	"How Do I Turn You On"	1	—	1	—

== Certifications ==
Region	Certification	Certified units/sales
United States (RIAA)	Gold	500,000^{^}
^{^} Shipments figures based on certification alone.
