= One Good Night Deserves Another =

Studio album by Steve Wariner
- Released: 1985
- Recorded: 1984
- Studio: Sound Stage Studios (Nashville, Tennessee)
- Genre: Country
- Length: 34:52
- Label: MCA Records
- Producer: Jimmy Bowen; Tony Brown

Steve Wariner chronology
Midnight Fire (1983)	One Good Night Deserves Another (1985)	Life's Highway (1986)

Singles from One Good Night Deserves Another
- 1. "What I Didn't Do" Released: December 15, 1984; 2. "Heart Trouble" Released: April 6, 1985; 3. "Some Fools Never Learn" Released: July 27, 1985

Professional ratings
Review scores
Source	Rating
Allmusic	3/5 stars

One Good Night Deserves Another is the third studio album by American country music artist Steve Wariner. It was released in 1985 by MCA Records. The album produced three singles, "What I Didn't Do", "Heart Trouble", and "Some Fools Never Learn", which respectively reached #3, #8, and #1 on the Billboard Hot Country Singles chart. "Some Fools Never Learn" was number one for one week and spent a total of twenty-two weeks on the chart.

== Track listing ==
No.	Title	Writer(s)	Length
1.	"Heart Trouble"	Dave Gibson, Kent Robbins	3:29
2.	"What I Didn't Do"	Wood Newton, Michael Noble	3:10
3.	"You Can't Cut Me Any Deeper"	Steve Wariner	3:21
4.	"Your Love Has Got a Hold on Me"	Paul Overstreet, Alan Ray	2:56
5.	"Some Fools Never Learn"	John Scott Sherrill	4:04
6.	"One Good Night Deserves Another"	Quentin Powers, Gary Baker, Susan Longacre	3:13
7.	"As Long as Love's Been Around"	Steve Earle, Sherrill	3:47
8.	"Gamblin' on Romance"	Ronnie Rogers	3:25
9.	"It's Only a Heartache"	Keith Stegall, Denny Henson	4:02
10.	"I Never Thought I'd See the Night"	Gibson, Robbins	3:37
Total length:			34:52

== Personnel ==
- Steve Wariner – lead vocals, electric guitars (1, 3, 7), electric guitar solo (1, 4, 5, 7), backing vocals (7)
- John Barlow Jarvis – keyboards
- Reggie Young – electric guitars
- Billy Joe Walker Jr. – acoustic guitars (1–7, 9, 10), electric guitars (6, 8, 10), electric guitar solo (6), classical guitar (9)
- Jerry Douglas – dobro (3)
- Carl Jackson – banjo (8), backing vocals (8)
- Emory Gordy Jr. – bass guitar
- Roger Hawkins – drums
- Johnny Gimble - fiddle (1, 5)
- Wendy Waldman – backing vocals (1, 2, 5, 6, 9, 10)
- Mac McAnally – backing vocals (2, 5, 7)
- Terry Wariner – backing vocals (3)
- Vince Gill – backing vocals (4, 6, 10)

=== Production ===
- Tony Brown – producer
- Jimmy Bowen – producer
- Steve Tillisch – first engineer
- Mark Coddington – second engineer
- Tim Kish – second engineer
- Glenn Meadows – mastering at Masterfonics (Nashville, Tennessee)
- Jeff Adamoff – art direction
- Bill Brunt – design
- Jim Osborn – design
- Don Light – management

== Chart performance ==
=== Weekly charts ===
Chart (1985)	Peak position
US Top Country Albums (Billboard)	20

=== Year-end charts ===
Chart (1985)	Position
US Top Country Albums (Billboard)	38
