= The Fireman (song) =

Single by George Strait

from the album Does Fort Worth Ever Cross Your Mind
- B-side: "What Did You Expect Me to Do"
- Released: May 6, 1985
- Recorded: June 27, 1984
- Genre: Western swing
- Length: 2:34
- Label: MCA
- Songwriters: Mack Vickery, Wayne Kemp
- Producers: Jimmy Bowen & George Strait

George Strait singles chronology
"The Cowboy Rides Away" (1985)	"The Fireman" (1985)	"The Chair" (1985)

"The Fireman" is a song written by Mack Vickery and Wayne Kemp, and recorded by American country music artist George Strait. It was released in May 1985 as the third and final single from his album Does Fort Worth Ever Cross Your Mind. It reached number 5 on the country music chart in the United States, and number 10 in Canada.

== Content ==
The narrator is a man with charm and wit that can cool down any angry woman. He tends to go after women that have just been in fights with their significant other or have recently experienced a break up. He even heads over to his friend's place to "cool off" the friend's woman with "a little mouth to mouth."

== Cover versions ==
Country music singer Alan Jackson covered the song from the television special George Strait: ACM Artist of the Decade All Star Concert.

== Critical reception ==
Kevin John Coyne of Country Universe gave the song a B− grade, calling it "more cocky than clever" and that "the strained metaphor that gives structure to the song errs too far on the side of ridiculous." He goes on to say that the only reason the song is "listenable at all is the fantastic Western swing arrangement and Strait’s in-on-the-joke delivery."

== Chart positions ==
Chart (1985)	Peak position
US Hot Country Songs (Billboard)	5
Canadian RPM Country Tracks	10

== Certifications ==
Certifications for The Fireman
Region	Certification	Certified units/sales
United States (RIAA)	Platinum	1,000,000^{‡}
^{‡} Sales+streaming figures based on certification alone.
