= Sawyer Brown (album) =

Studio album by Sawyer Brown
- Released: 1984
- Studio: Scruggs Sound (Berry Hill, Tennessee)
- Genre: Country
- Length: 30:18
- Label: Capitol/Curb
- Producer: Randy Scruggs

Sawyer Brown chronology
Sawyer Brown (1984)	Shakin' (1985)

Singles from Sawyer Brown
- 1. "Leona" Released: October 6, 1984; 2. "Step That Step" Released: January 28, 1985; 3. "Used to Blue" Released: May 1985

Sawyer Brown is the debut album of American country music band Sawyer Brown. It features the singles "Leona" (#16 on Hot Country Songs), "Step That Step" (their first #1), and "Used to Blue" (#3). "Staying Afloat" was first recorded two years earlier by The Oak Ridge Boys on their album, Step on Out.

== Track listing ==
No.	Title	Writer(s)	Length
1.	"Leona"	Bill Shore, David Wills	3:02
2.	"Feel Like Me"	Mark Miller, Randy Scruggs	3:05
3.	"Used to Blue"	J. Fred Knobloch, Bill LaBounty	3:20
4.	"It's Hard to Keep a Good Love Down"	Miller, Scruggs	3:04
5.	"Step That Step"	Miller	2:50
6.	"Smoking in the Rockies"	Frank Dycus, Dean Dillon, Buddy Cannon, Gary Stewart	2:53
7.	"Staying Afloat"	J. D. Martin, Don King	2:44
8.	"Broken Candy"	Miller	3:27
9.	"The Sun Don't Shine on the Same Folks All the Time"	Mark Gray, Danny Morrison, Johnny Slate	2:49
10.	"Going Back to Indiana"	Berry Gordy, Fonce Mizell, Freddie Perren, Deke Richards	3:04

== Personnel ==
- Mark Miller – lead vocals, electric guitar
- Gregg "Hobie" Hubbard – keyboards, backing vocals
- Bobby Randall – acoustic guitar, electric guitars, backing vocals
- Jim Scholten – bass
- Joe "Curley" Smyth – drums, percussion

== Production ==
- Randy Scruggs – producer, mixing
- Tom Brown – engineer, mixing
- David LaBarre – editing
- Glenn Meadows – mastering at Masterfonics (Nashville, Tennessee)
- Roy Kohara – art direction
- John O'Brien – design
- Greg Gorman – photography

== Charts ==
=== Weekly charts ===
Chart (1985)	Peak position
US Billboard 200	140
US Top Country Albums (Billboard)	2

=== Year-end charts ===
Chart (1985)	Position
US Top Country Albums (Billboard)	13
