= Heart Trouble (Steve Wariner song) =

Single by Steve Wariner

from the album One Good Night Deserves Another
- B-side: "As Long as Love's Been Around"
- Released: April 6, 1985
- Genre: Country
- Length: 3:29
- Label: MCA
- Songwriter(s): Dave Gibson, Kent Robbins
- Producer(s): Tony Brown, Jimmy Bowen

Steve Wariner singles chronology
"What I Didn't Do" (1984)	"Heart Trouble" (1985)	"Some Fools Never Learn" (1985)

"Heart Trouble" is a song written by Dave Gibson and Kent Robbins, and recorded by American country music artist Steve Wariner. It was released in April 1985 as the second single from the album One Good Night Deserves Another. The song reached #8 on the Billboard Hot Country Singles & Tracks chart.

== Chart performance ==
Chart (1985)	Peak position
US Hot Country Songs (Billboard)	8
Canadian RPM Country Tracks	15
