= Used to Blue =

Single by Sawyer Brown

from the album Sawyer Brown
- B-side: "It's Hard To Keep A Good Love Down"
- Released: May 1985
- Genre: Country
- Length: 3:20
- Label: Capitol/Curb 5477
- Songwriter(s): J. Fred Knobloch, Bill LaBounty
- Producer(s): Randy Scruggs

Sawyer Brown singles chronology
| "Step That Step" (1985) | "Used to Blue" (1985) | "Betty's Bein' Bad" (1985) |

"Used to Blue" is a song written by J. Fred Knobloch and Bill LaBounty, and recorded by American country music group Sawyer Brown. It was released in May 1985 as the third single from their self-titled debut album. It peaked at number 3 on the U.S. Billboard Hot Country Songs chart and it became their second number-one hit on the Canadian RPM country singles chart.

== Charts ==
=== Weekly charts ===
| Chart (1985) | Peak position |
|---|---|
| US Hot Country Songs (Billboard) | 3 |
| Canadian RPM Country Tracks | 1 |

=== Year-end charts ===
| Chart (1985) | Position |
|---|---|
| US Hot Country Songs (Billboard) | 33 |
