= Friendship (Ray Charles album) =

Studio album by Ray Charles
- Released: August 1984
- Genre: Country; country pop
- Length: 28:51
- Label: Columbia, Epic
- Producer: Billy Sherrill

Ray Charles chronology
Do I Ever Cross Your Mind (1984)	Friendship (1984)	The Spirit of Christmas (1984)

Friendship is a studio album by American singer and pianist Ray Charles. It was produced by Billy Sherrill and released in August 1984 by Columbia Records and Epic Records. The album peaked at number 1 on the Billboard Top Country Albums chart.

The album was one of several in the mid-1980s that featured Charles returning to country music after a two-decade absence; he had previously recorded the two-volume Modern Sounds in Country and Western Music to much acclaim in 1962. For Friendship, Charles collaborated with several established country stars in a series of duets. Whereas the Modern Sounds singles were not explicitly released to country radio, the singles from Friendship were, and the album provided Charles with his highest-charting hits on the country charts, including a number-one country hit with Willie Nelson, "Seven Spanish Angels".

== Release and reception ==
Retrospective professional ratings
Review scores
Source	Rating
AllMusic	2/5 stars
Blender	3/5 stars
The Rolling Stone Album Guide	2.5/5 stars

Friendship was first released in August 1984 by Columbia Records and Epic Records. It reached the number-one position on the Billboard's Top Country Albums and remained on the chart for 70 weeks. According to Stephen Thomas Erlewine, the album was "a big hit, really the last genuine hit when Charles was alive", as well as "the pinnacle of his '80s country-pop records, the one where Ray truly captured the sound of the era". It was later reissued by Columbia as Ray Charles and Friends' Super Hits. In 2005, Friendship was reissued again by Columbia in partnership with Legacy Recordings.

In a retrospective review for AllMusic, Erlewine judged the album's best moments to be "merely pleasant; at its worst, it's simply dull" and "more of a testament to the power of Sherrill's Music City machine than it is to Charles' greatness." Robert Christgau was more enthusiastic reviewing the album's 2005 reissue, saying the duet concept worked "pretty darn good on the only memorable album of his Nashville foray". He cited "We Didn't See a Thing" as a highlight of both Charles and George Jones' late-period recordings and also applauded the two bonus songs, despite their deviation from the original album's stylistic concept.

== Track listing ==
No.	Title	Writer(s)	Duet partner(s)	Length
1.	"Two Old Cats Like Us"	Troy Seals	Hank Williams, Jr.	2:35
2.	"This Old Heart (Is Gonna Rise Again)"	J. Martin Johnson, Bucky Jones	The Oak Ridge Boys	3:05
3.	"We Didn't See a Thing"	Gary Gentry	Chet Atkins and George Jones	2:12
4.	"Who Cares"	Gentry, Shelby Kennedy	Janie Fricke	2:58
5.	"Rock and Roll Shoes"	Paul Kennerley, Graham Lyle	B. J. Thomas	2:43
6.	"Friendship"	Cole Porter	Ricky Skaggs	2:41
7.	"It Ain't Gonna Worry My Mind"	Richard Leigh	Mickey Gilley	2:54
8.	"Little Hotel Room"	Freddy Powers	Merle Haggard	3:01
9.	"Crazy Old Soldier"	Kennerley, Seals	Johnny Cash	3:33
10.	"Seven Spanish Angels"	Seals, Eddie Setser	Willie Nelson	3:52

2005 CD bonus tracks
No.	Title	Duet partner(s)	Length
11.	"Everybody Has the Blues"	Tony Bennett	3:40
12.	"Baby Grand"	Billy Joel	4:04

== Personnel ==
- Ray Charles – vocals
- Billy Sanford (tracks: A1), Dale Sellers (tracks: A5), Pete Bordonali (tracks: A1, A2, A4, B1, B2, B4), Reggie Young (tracks: A3, B3) – electric guitar
- Billy Sanford (tracks: A2, A4, A5, B1 to B5), Dale Sellers (tracks: A1 to A4, B1, B2, B4, B5), Jerry Kennedy (track: A5), Pete Bordonali (tracks: A3, B3), Ricky Skaggs (track: B1) – acoustic guitar
- Bob Wray (tracks: A5, B1, B2, B5), Henry Strzelecki (tracks: A1 to A4, B3, B4) – bass guitar
- Bobby Ogdin (track: A3), Bobby Wood (track: A1), Hargus "Pig" Robbins (tracks: A2 to A5, B1 to B5) – keyboards
- Buddy Emmons (tracks: A3, B3), Pete Drake (tracks: A1, A2, A4, A5, B1, B2, B4, B5) – steel guitar
- Pete Bordonali (track: B5) – gut-string guitar
- Jerry Douglas (tracks: B1), Pete Drake (tracks: A3, B3) – Dobro
- Jerry Carrigan (tracks: A1, B2), Jerry Kroon (track: A4), Kenny Malone (tracks: A2, A3, A5, B1, B3 to B5) – drums
- Ron Reynolds (tracks: A3, A4, B2), Terry McMillan (tracks: A2, A4, A5, B1, B3, B4) – percussion
- Terry McMillan (tracks: A1 to A3, B2 to B5) – harmonica
- Denis Solee (track: A1) – saxophone
- Bill McElhiney (track: B5), Jose McElhiney (track: B5) – trumpet
- Diane Tidwell (tracks: A1, A4, B5), Hurshel Wiginton (tracks: A1, A4, B4, B5), Judy Rodman (tracks: B4), Lisa Silver (tracks: A1, A4, B5), Louis Nunley (tracks: A1, A4, B4, B5), Wendy Suits (track: B4) – backing vocals
- The "A" Strings (tracks: B2 to B5) – stings
- Bill McElhiney – string arrangements, conductor

== Charts ==
=== Weekly charts ===
Chart (1984–1985)	Peak position
Australian (Kent Music Report)	87
Canadian Albums (RPM)	81
US Billboard 200	75
US Top Country Albums (Billboard)	1

=== Year-end charts ===
Chart (1985)	Position
US Top Country Albums (Billboard)	5
