= What I Didn't Do =

Single by Steve Wariner

from the album One Good Night Deserves Another
- B-side: "Your Love Has Got a Hold on Me"
- Released: December 15, 1984
- Genre: Country
- Length: 3:10
- Label: MCA
- Songwriter(s): Wood Newton, Michael Noble
- Producer(s): Tony Brown, Jimmy Bowen

Steve Wariner singles chronology
"Don't You Give Up on Love" (1984)	"What I Didn't Do" (1984)	"Heart Trouble" (1985)

"What I Didn't Do" is a song written by Wood Newton and Michael Noble, and recorded by American country music artist Steve Wariner. It was released in December 1984 as the first single from the album One Good Night Deserves Another. The song reached #3 on the Billboard Hot Country Singles & Tracks chart.

== Chart performance ==
Chart (1984–1985)	Peak position
US Hot Country Songs (Billboard)	3
Canadian RPM Country Tracks	1
