= Greatest Hits, Vol. 2 (Ronnie Milsap album) =

Album by Ronnie Milsap

Compilation album by Ronnie Milsap
- Released: 1985
- Genre: Country
- Length: 37:13
- Label: RCA Victor
- Producers: Tom Collins, Rob Galbraith, Ronnie Milsap

Ronnie Milsap chronology
One More Try for Love (1984)	Greatest Hits, Vol. 2 (1985)	Lost in the Fifties Tonight (1985)

Singles from Greatest Hits, Vol. 2
- 1. "She Keeps the Home Fires Burning" Released: April 6, 1985; 2. "Lost in the Fifties Tonight (In the Still of the Night)" Released: July 13, 1985

Professional ratings
Review scores
Source	Rating
Allmusic	link

Greatest Hits, Vol. 2 is a compilation album by American country music singer Ronnie Milsap. The album was released in 1985 by RCA Records. Two singles were released from the project, "She Keeps the Home Fires Burning" and "Lost in the Fifties Tonight (In the Still of the Night)," both of which reached Number One on the Billboard Hot Country Singles & Tracks chart. Since its release, the album has been certified Platinum by the RIAA for shipments of over 1 million copies.

== Track listing ==
No.	Title	Writer(s)	Length
1.	"She Keeps the Home Fires Burning"	Dennis Morgan, Mike Reid, Don Pfrimmer	3:55
2.	"(There's) No Gettin' Over Me"	Walt Aldridge, Tom Brasfield	3:15
3.	"I Wouldn't Have Missed It for the World"	Kye Fleming, Morgan, Charles Quillen	3:32
4.	"It's Already Taken"	Fleming, Alan Gorrie	3:38
5.	"Stranger in My House"	Reid	4:04
6.	"Lost in the Fifties Tonight (In the Still of the Night)"	Fred Parris, Reid, Troy Seals	4:05
7.	"Any Day Now"	Burt Bacharach, Bob Hilliard	3:41
8.	"Am I Losing You"	Jim Reeves	3:35
9.	"Inside"	Reid	4:02
10.	"Don't You Know How Much I Love You"	Michael Stewart, Dan Williams	3:26

== Charts ==
=== Weekly charts ===
Chart (1985)	Peak position
US Billboard 200	102
US Top Country Albums (Billboard)	1

=== Year-end charts ===
Chart (1985)	Position
US Top Country Albums (Billboard)	12
Chart (1986)	Position
US Top Country Albums (Billboard)	20

== Certifications ==
Region	Certification	Certified units/sales
United States (RIAA)	Platinum	1,000,000^{^}
^{^} Shipments figures based on certification alone.
