= 40-Hour Week =

1985 album by Alabama

Studio album by Alabama
- Released: January 1985; October 25, 1990 (re-released)
- Recorded: September 1984 at The Music Mill, Nashville, TN
- Genre: Country
- Length: 39:48
- Label: RCA Nashville
- Producer: Alabama; Harold Shedd

Alabama chronology
Roll On (1984)	40-Hour Week (1985)	Christmas (1985)

Singles from 40-Hour Week
- 1. "There's No Way" Released: January 20, 1985; 2. "40 Hour Week (For a Livin')" Released: April 17, 1985; 3. "Can't Keep a Good Man Down" Released: August 9, 1985

Professional ratings
Review scores
Source	Rating
Allmusic	4.5/5 stars

40-Hour Week is the ninth studio album from American country music band Alabama. Released in January 1985, the album included three songs that topped the Billboard magazine Hot Country Singles chart and continued the band's dominance during the 1980s. The album peaked at number one on the Billboard Country Albums chart and number 28 on the Billboard 200.

Two of the No. 1 tracks — "There's No Way" and the title track — became milestones in Alabama's recording career during 1985. When it reached the top of the chart on May 4, "There's No Way" became Alabama's 16th consecutive No. 1 single (excepting for the 1982 Christmas single "Christmas in Dixie"). The feat allowed Alabama to tie Sonny James' 14-year-old record for most No. 1 songs in as many consecutive single releases. Then, on August 3, "40 Hour Week (For a Livin')" topped the chart, becoming Alabama's 17th-straight chart topper and allowing them to surpass James' record.

Among the album tracks, several of them praising the South, 40 Hour Week also features the ballad "I Want To Know You Before We Make Love", which became a major hit for Conway Twitty in 1987.

This was Alabama's only album from which all the singles had accompanying music videos.

== Track listing ==
Side A
No.	Title	Writer(s)	Length
1.	"40 Hour Week (For a Livin')"	Dave Loggins, Lisa Silver, Don Schlitz	3:18
2.	"Can't Keep A Good Man Down"	Bob Corbin	3:45
3.	"There's No Way"	Lisa Palas, Will Robinson, John Jarrard	4:11
4.	"Down On Longboat Key"	Dennis Morgan, Stephen Allen Davis	4:05
5.	"Louisiana Moon"	Larry Shell, Dan Mitchell	3:04

Side B
No.	Title	Writer(s)	Length
1.	"I Want to Know You Before We Make Love"	Becky Hobbs, Candy Parton	3:58
2.	"Fireworks"	Ronny Scaife, Phil Thomas, Kenny Durham	3:52
3.	"(She Won't Have A Thing To Do With) Nobody But Me"	Dean Dillon, Buzz Rabin, "Flash Gordon"	3:16
4.	"As Right Now"	Teddy Gentry, Greg Fowler	2:45
5.	"If It Ain't Dixie (It Won't Do)"	Jarrard, Kent Robbins	7:34

== Personnel ==
as listed in liner notes

=== Alabama ===
- Jeff Cook – electric guitar, background vocals, lead vocals on "(She Won't Have a Thing to Do With) Nobody But Me"
- Teddy Gentry – bass guitar, background vocals, lead vocals on "As Right Now"
- Mark Herndon – drums
- Randy Owen – lead vocals, electric guitar

=== Additional musicians ===
- Eddie Bayers – drums
- Kenneth Bell – acoustic guitar
- David Briggs – keyboards
- Costo Davis – Kurzweil Synthesizer
- Jack Eubanks – acoustic guitar
- Gregg Galbraith – electric guitar
- Roger Hawkins – drums
- George (Leo) Jackson – acoustic guitar
- Fred Newell – electric guitar
- Larry Paxton – bass guitar
- Willie Rainsford – keyboards
- Brent Rowan – electric guitar
- Ronnie Scaife – electric guitar
- Milton Sledge – drums

Strings by the "A" Strings, arranged by Kristin Wilkinson.

== Charts ==
=== Weekly charts ===
Chart (1985)	Peak position
Canadian Albums (RPM)	69
US Billboard 200	28
US Top Country Albums (Billboard)	1

=== Year-end charts ===
Chart (1985)	Position
US Billboard 200	83
US Top Country Albums (Billboard)	1

Chart (1986)	Position
US Top Country Albums (Billboard)	17

=== Singles ===
Year	Single	Peak positions	
Year	Single	US Country	CAN Country
1985	"There's No Way"	1	2
1985	"40 Hour Week (For a Livin')"	1	1
1985	"Can't Keep a Good Man Down"	1	1

== Certifications ==
Region	Certification	Certified units/sales
United States (RIAA)	2× Platinum	2,000,000^{^}
^{^} Shipments figures based on certification alone.
