= There's No Way (Alabama song) =

Single by Alabama

from the album 40-Hour Week
- B-side: "The Boy"
- Released: January 20, 1985; April 9, 1985 (UK)
- Recorded: 1984
- Genre: Country, soft rock
- Length: 4:11
- Label: RCA Nashville
- Songwriters: John Jarrard, Lisa Palas and Will Robinson
- Producers: Harold Shedd and Alabama

Alabama singles chronology
"(There's A) Fire in the Night" (1984)	"There's No Way" (1985)	"40 Hour Week (For a Livin')" (1985)

"There's No Way" is a song written by John Jarrard, Lisa Palas and Will Robinson, and recorded by American country music band Alabama. It was released in January 1985 as the first single from the band's album 40-Hour Week.

== Content ==
The song is a love ballad, and an example of the pop-styled aspect of Alabama's core musical style.

== Music video ==
The music video was directed by David Hogan and premiered in early 1985. The video contains a notable appearance by then-future The Bold and the Beautiful cast member Katherine Kelly Lang.

== A record tied ==
When "There's No Way" reached No. 1 on the Billboard magazine Hot Country Singles chart in May 1985, it became Alabama's 16th straight No. 1 single in as many single releases (excepting for the 1982 Christmas single "Christmas in Dixie"). The feat allowed Alabama to tie Sonny James' 14-year-old record for most No. 1 songs in as many consecutive single releases.

== Charts ==
=== Weekly charts ===
Chart (1985)	Peak position
US Hot Country Songs (Billboard)	1
Canadian RPM Country Tracks	2

=== Year-end charts ===
Chart (1985)	Position
US Hot Country Songs (Billboard)	26
