= Something in My Heart =

1984 song

Single by Ricky Skaggs

from the album Country Boy
- B-side: "Baby I'm in Love with You"
- Released: October 1984
- Genre: Country
- Length: 2:42
- Label: Epic
- Songwriter(s): Wayland Patton
- Producer(s): Ricky Skaggs

Ricky Skaggs singles chronology
"Uncle Pen" (1984)	"Something in My Heart" (1984)	"Country Boy" (1985)

"Something in My Heart" is a song written by Wayland Patton, and recorded by American country music artist Ricky Skaggs. It was released in October 1984 as the first single from his album Country Boy. The song reached #2 on the Billboard Hot Country Singles chart in February 1985 and #1 on the RPM Country Tracks chart in Canada.

== Charts ==
=== Weekly charts ===
Chart (1984–1985)	Peak position
US Hot Country Songs (Billboard)	2
Canadian RPM Country Tracks	1

=== Year-end charts ===
Chart (1985)	Position
US Hot Country Songs (Billboard)	49
