= Does Fort Worth Ever Cross Your Mind =

1984 studio album by George Strait

Studio album by George Strait
- Released: September 26, 1984
- Recorded: June 1984
- Studio: Sound Stage Studio; Nashville, Tennessee
- Genre: Neotraditional country; Western swing; honky-tonk
- Length: 25:55
- Label: MCA; MCAD-31032
- Producer: Jimmy Bowen; George Strait

George Strait chronology
Right or Wrong (1983)	Does Fort Worth Ever; Cross Your Mind (1984)	Greatest Hits (1985)

Singles from Does Fort Worth Ever Cross Your Mind
- 1. "Does Fort Worth Ever Cross Your Mind" Released: September 4, 1984; 2. "The Cowboy Rides Away" Released: January 14, 1985; 3. "The Fireman" Released: May 6, 1985

Professional ratings
Review scores
Source	Rating
AllMusic	5/5 stars
Robert Christgau	B+

Does Fort Worth Ever Cross Your Mind is the fourth studio album by American country music artist George Strait, released on September 26, 1984, by MCA Records. It is certified platinum by the RIAA for sales of one million copies in the U.S. The title track, "The Cowboy Rides Away", and "The Fireman" were all released as singles from this album. "Honky Tonk Saturday Night" was previously recorded by John Anderson on his 1982 album, Wild & Blue. American music critic Robert Christgau would refer the album as Strait’s best to date in his relative review.

== Track listing ==
Side one
No.	Title	Writer(s)	Length
1.	"Does Fort Worth Ever Cross Your Mind"	Sanger D. Shafer, Darlene Shafer	3:15
2.	"Any Old Time"	Jeff Dayton, Katherine Elizabeth Nicoll	2:03
3.	"I Need Someone Like Me"	S. Shafer	2:46
4.	"You're Dancin' This Dance All Wrong"	John Porter McMeans, Ron Moore	3:57
5.	"Honky Tonk Saturday Night"	S. Shafer	2:29

Side two
No.	Title	Writer(s)	Length
1.	"I Should Have Watched That First Step"	Wayne Kemp	2:57
2.	"Love Comes from the Other Side of Town"	Fred J. Freiling	2:17
3.	"The Cowboy Rides Away"	Sonny Throckmorton, Casey Kelly	3:20
4.	"What Did You Expect Me to Do"	S. Shafer	2:38
5.	"The Fireman"	Mack Vickery, Kemp	2:34
Total length:			25:55

== Personnel ==
- George Strait – lead vocals, harmony vocals, acoustic guitar
- John Hobbs – keyboards
- Larry Byrom – electric guitars
- Reggie Young – electric guitars
- Randy Scruggs – acoustic guitars
- Hank DeVito – steel guitar
- Weldon Myrick – steel guitar
- Johnny Gimble – fiddle, mandolin
- David Hungate – bass guitar
- Eddie Bayers – drums
- Curtis Young – backing vocals

Production

- Jimmy Bowen – producer
- George Strait – producer
- Dave Hassinger – first engineer
- Steve Tillisch – first engineer
- Ron Treat – first engineer
- Mark Coddington – second engineer
- Tim Kish – second engineer
- Glenn Meadows – mastering at Masterfonics (Nashville, Tennessee)
- Jim Shea – photography
- Jeff Adamoff – art direction

== Charts ==
=== Weekly charts ===
Chart (1984–1985)	Peak position
US Billboard 200	139
US Top Country Albums (Billboard)	1

=== Year-end charts ===
Chart (1985)	Position
US Top Country Albums (Billboard)	3

== Certifications ==
Certifications for Does Fort Worth Ever Cross Your Mind
Region	Certification	Certified units/sales
United States (RIAA)	Platinum	1,000,000^{^}
^{^} Shipments figures based on certification alone.
