= Country Boy (Ricky Skaggs album) =

Studio album by Ricky Skaggs
- Released: October 1984
- Studios: Audio Media Recording (Nashville, Tennessee)
- Genres: Country, country pop, bluegrass
- Length: 30:45
- Label: Epic
- Producer: Ricky Skaggs

Ricky Skaggs chronology
Don't Cheat in Our Hometown (1983)	Country Boy (1984)	Favorite Country Songs (1985)

Singles from Country Boy
- 1. "Something in My Heart" Released: October 1984; 2. "Country Boy" Released: February 1985

Professional ratings
Review scores
Source	Rating
Allmusic	4.5/5 stars

Country Boy is the seventh studio album by American country music artist Ricky Skaggs. It was released in 1984 via Epic Records. The album peaked at number 1 on the Billboard Top Country Albums chart.

== Track listing ==
No.	Title	Writer(s)	Length
1.	"Country Boy"	Tony Colton, Albert Lee, Raymond B. Smith	3:50
2.	"Something in My Heart"	Wayland Patton	2:42
3.	"Patiently Waiting"	Don Clark, Vickie Clark, Larry Cordle	2:51
4.	"Two Highways"	Cordle	3:51
5.	"Wheel Hoss"	Bill Monroe	2:57
6.	"Rendezvous"	Peter Rowan	3:34
7.	"Brand New Me"	Carl Chambers	3:27
8.	"Window Up Above"	George Jones	3:04
9.	"Baby I'm in Love with You"	Alex Gibson, Andy Gibson, Joe Weaver	2:12
10.	"I'm Ready to Go"	Carter Stanley, William Herbert York	2:37
Total length:			30:45

== Personnel ==
- Ricky Skaggs – vocals, all guitars, mandolin (1, 3, 7, 10), backing vocals (4), fiddles (6)
- Gary Smith – acoustic piano (1, 2, 5, 8, 10)
- Dennis Burnside – acoustic piano (3, 4, 6, 7)
- Buck White – acoustic piano (9)
- Bruce Bouton – steel guitar (1, 2, 5, 9, 10)
- Lloyd Green – steel guitar (3, 4, 6, 7)
- Buddy Emmons – steel guitar (8)
- Lou Reid – banjo (1, 10), harmony vocals (3, 10)
- Bill Monroe – mandolin (5)
- Jesse Chambers – bass (1, 2, 5, 8–10)
- Joe Osborn – bass (3, 4, 6, 7)
- George Grantham – drums (1, 2, 5, 8–10)
- Eddie Bayers – drums (3, 4, 6, 7)
- Bobby Hicks – fiddle (1–3, 5, 8–10)
- Crom Tidwell – kazoo (1)
- Molly Bright – harmony vocals (6)

== Production ==
- Ricky Skaggs – producer
- Marshall Morgan – engineer, mixing
- Robbie Rose – assistant engineer
- Glenn Meadows – mastering at Masterfonics (Nashville, Tennessee)
- Jeff Morris – design
- Joe Rogers – design
- Leonard Kamsler – photography
- Chip Peay Entetprises – management
- Kathy Gangwisch & Associates – public relations
- Ben Farrell for Varnell Enterprises – concert promotion

== Charts ==
=== Weekly charts ===
Chart (1984–1985)	Peak position
US Billboard 200	180
US Top Country Albums (Billboard)	1

=== Year-end charts ===
Chart (1985)	Position
US Top Country Albums (Billboard)	4
