= Does Fort Worth Ever Cross Your Mind (song) =

Single by George Strait

from the album Does Fort Worth Ever Cross Your Mind
- B-side: "Love Comes from the Other Side of Town"
- Released: September 4, 1984
- Recorded: June 25, 1984
- Genre: Country
- Length: 3:15 (album version); 3:05 (single edit)
- Label: MCA 52458
- Songwriter(s): Sanger D. Shafer, Darlene Shafer
- Producer(s): Jimmy Bowen & George Strait

George Strait singles chronology
"Let's Fall to Pieces Together" (1984)	"Does Fort Worth Ever Cross Your Mind" (1984)	"The Cowboy Rides Away" (1985)

"Does Fort Worth Ever Cross Your Mind" is a song written by Sanger D. Shafer and Darlene Shafer, and recorded by American country music artist George Strait. It was released in September 1984 as the lead-off single and title track from his album of the same name. It reached number one on the country music charts in the United States, and number 10 in Canada.

== Content ==
The song's narrator is in Fort Worth, Texas, drinking beer and thinking about a former romantic interest who is now with someone else in nearby Dallas. He wonders if she ever thinks of him and the good times they had together.

== Cover versions ==
Country music singer Leann Rimes covered the song from the television special George Strait: ACM Artist of the Decade All Star Concert.

== Critical reception ==
Kevin John Coyne of Country Universe gave the song a 'B' grade, saying that it "has a great opening line" and a "more confident vocal and a Texas-centric focus certainly would’ve made it stand out back in 1984."

== Other versions ==
Moe Bandy recorded the song for his 1977 album I'm Sorry for You My Friend. Keith Whitley recorded the song also in 1984, and released it to radio as a non-album track. It received moderate airplay.

== Chart positions ==
Chart (1984–1985)	Peak position
US Hot Country Songs (Billboard)	1
Canadian RPM Country Tracks	10
