= Seven Spanish Angels =

Single by Ray Charles with Willie Nelson

from the album Friendship
- B-side: "Who Cares"
- Released: November 1984
- Genre: Country; gospel
- Length: 3:52
- Label: Columbia
- Songwriters: Troy Seals; Eddie Setser
- Producer: Billy Sherrill

Ray Charles singles chronology
"Rock and Roll Shoes" (1984)	"Seven Spanish Angels" (1984)	"It Ain't Gonna Worry My Mind" (1985)

Willie Nelson singles chronology
"City of New Orleans" (1984)	"Seven Spanish Angels" (1984)	"Forgiving You Was Easy" (1985)

"Seven Spanish Angels" is a song written by Troy Seals and Eddie Setser, and recorded by Ray Charles as a duet with Willie Nelson. It was released in November 1984 as a single from Charles' 1984 album Friendship. Charles and Nelson split the verses, with Charles singing the first and Nelson the second, Charles sang the first and second choruses with Nelson joining for the outro. It was also included on Nelson's 1985 compilation album Half Nelson. "Seven Spanish Angels" was the most successful of Charles' eight hits on the country chart. The single spent one week at number one and a total of twelve weeks on the country chart.

Setser had suggested the title "Seven Spanish Angels" and he and Seals had written the song as a homage to the tejano flavored classic hits of Marty Robbins exemplified by Robbins' career record "El Paso" (Troy Seals quote): "When we finished it we thought 'Who in the world's gonna do it?' because Marty was [deceased]." Within two days "Seven Spanish Angels" had been successfully pitched to Willie Nelson. Before Nelson was able to record it, producer Billy Sherrill happened to hear the demo and wanted the song for Ray Charles. Sherrill proposed that Nelson and Charles duet on the song after learning of Nelson's having reserved it.

== Content ==
The song is about an outlaw and his lover who are trying to outrun a posse sent to return them to Texas. When they are cornered, they decide to fight the approaching lawmen. Before the final gunfight, the two embrace, speaking of their belief that God will spare them. The gunfight then commences, with the outlaw firing upon the posse. He is immediately shot and killed, prompting his distraught lover to pick up his gun. She tearfully prays, "Father, please forgive me; I can't make it without my man." She deliberately points the empty weapon at the lawmen and is then shot dead. After each death, the titular angels gather to pray for the lovers. This is followed by "thunder from the throne" and the angels "tak[ing] another angel home". Seals stated that "We tried to make [the story] ethereal but also believable". As written the song included the lines: "Now the people in the valley swear/ That when the moon's just right/ They see the Texan and his woman/ Ride across the clouds at night", which Sherrill preferred not to record feeling the track would run too long.

== Charts ==
=== Weekly charts ===
Chart (1984–1985)	Peak position
US Hot Country Songs (Billboard)	1
Canadian RPM Country Tracks	1
New Zealand Singles Chart	6
Australian Kent Music Report	29

=== Year-end charts ===
Chart (1985)	Position
US Hot Country Songs (Billboard)	18
New Zealand (RIANZ)	43

== Cover versions ==
- Croatian singer Mišo Kovač in 1986 made his adaptation of song titled "Ti si pjesma moje duše" (You are the song of my soul).
- Canadian artist Corb Lund released his cover on the 2019 album Cover Your Tracks.
- Alison Krauss and Jamey Johnson covered the song at the 2015 Gershwin prize tribute concert in Washington D.C., with Nelson and his wife in attendance on November 18, 2015. (Nelson received the Library of Congress Gershwin Prize for Popular Song).
- Sierra Ferrell released a cover of the song in May 2023 to celebrate Nelson's 90th birthday and has been including it in her live performances in 2023.
- Norwegian artist Diddi Velle released a cover of the song as her debut single on July 28, 2023.
- The Red Clay Strays have also covered this song featuring Justin Jeansonne.
- Jason Boland & The Stragglers would often play a cover of the song during their early years, and it was a popular fan request.
