= Girls Night Out (The Judds song) =

Single by The Judds

from the album Why Not Me
- B-side: "Sleeping Heart"
- Released: January 1985
- Studio: Creative Workshop (Berry Hill, Tennessee)
- Genre: Country
- Length: 2:50
- Label: RCA/Curb
- Songwriter(s): Brent Maher; Jeffrey Bullock
- Producer(s): Brent Maher

The Judds singles chronology
"Why Not Me" (1984)	"Girls Night Out" (1985)	"Love Is Alive" (1985)

"Girls Night Out" is a song written by Brent Maher and Jeffrey Bullock, and recorded by American country music duo The Judds. It was released in January 1985 as the second single from the album Why Not Me. The song was their third number one hit on the country chart. The single went to number one for one week and spent a total of fourteen weeks on the country chart.

== Charts ==
=== Weekly charts ===
Chart (1985)	Peak position
US Hot Country Songs (Billboard)	1
Canadian RPM Country Tracks	1

=== Year-end charts ===
Chart (1985)	Position
US Hot Country Songs (Billboard)	23
