= Some Fools Never Learn =

Single by Steve Wariner

from the album One Good Night Deserves Another
- B-side: "You Can't Cut Me Any Deeper"
- Released: July 27, 1985
- Genre: Country
- Length: 4:06
- Label: MCA
- Songwriter: John Scott Sherrill
- Producers: Jimmy Bowen, Tony Brown

Steve Wariner singles chronology
"Heart Trouble" (1985)	"Some Fools Never Learn" (1985)	"You Can Dream of Me" (1985)

"Some Fools Never Learn" is a song written by John Scott Sherrill and recorded by American country music artist Steve Wariner. It was released in July 1985 as the third single from the album One Good Night Deserves Another. The song was Wariner's second number one on the country chart. The single went to number one for one week and spent a total of twenty-two weeks on the chart.

Sherrill originally recorded the song in 1982 for Portrait Records.

== Charts ==
=== Weekly charts ===
Chart (1985)	Peak position
US Hot Country Songs (Billboard)	1
Canadian RPM Country Tracks	1

=== Year-end charts ===
Chart (1985)	Position
US Hot Country Songs (Billboard)	21
