= Can't Keep a Good Man Down (Alabama song) =

Single by Alabama

from the album 40-Hour Week
- B-side: "If It Ain't Dixie (It Won't Do)"
- Released: August 9, 1985
- Recorded: 1984
- Genre: Country
- Length: 3:45
- Label: RCA Nashville
- Songwriter: Bob Corbin
- Producers: Harold Shedd and Alabama

Alabama singles chronology
"40 Hour Week (For a Livin')" (1985)	"Can't Keep a Good Man Down" (1985)	"She and I" (1985)

Music video
- "Can't Keep a Good Man Down" at CMT.com

"Can't Keep a Good Man Down" is a song written by Bob Corbin, and recorded by American country music band Alabama. It was released in August 1985 as the third and final single from the band's album 40-Hour Week.

That November, it became the band's 18th straight No. 1 song in as many single releases, extending their streak just set three months earlier with "40 Hour Week (For a Livin')".

== Music video ==
A music video was filmed for the song, and has aired on CMT and Great American Country.

== Chart positions ==
Chart (1985)	Peak position
US Hot Country Songs (Billboard)	1
Canadian RPM Country Tracks	1

== Sources ==
- Roland, Tom, "The Billboard Book of Number One Country Hits" (Billboard Books, Watson-Guptill Publications, New York, 1991 (ISBN 0-82-307553-2))
