= Don't Call Him a Cowboy =

- German release picture sleeve

Single by Conway Twitty

from the album Don't Call Him a Cowboy
- B-side: "After All the Good Is Gone"
- Released: February 1985
- Genre: Country
- Length: 2:35
- Label: Warner Bros.
- Songwriters: Debbie Hupp; Johnny MacRae; Bob Morrison
- Producers: Conway Twitty, Dee Henry, Ron Treat

Conway Twitty singles chronology
"Ain't She Somethin' Else" (1984)	"Don't Call Him a Cowboy" (1985)	"Between Blue Eyes and Jeans" (1985)

"Don't Call Him a Cowboy" is a song written by Debbie Hupp, Johnny MacRae and Bob Morrison, and recorded by American country music artist Conway Twitty. It was released in February 1985 as the first single and title track from the album Don't Call Him a Cowboy. The song was Twitty's 34th Billboard number one single on the country chart. The single went to number one for one week and spent a total of 13 weeks on the chart.

== Content ==
The song criticizes the Urban Cowboy movement of the early 80's.

== Charts ==
=== Weekly charts ===
Chart (1985)	Peak position
US Hot Country Songs (Billboard)	1
Canadian RPM Country Tracks	1

=== Year-end charts ===
Chart (1985)	Position
US Hot Country Songs (Billboard)	45
