= Step That Step =

Single by Sawyer Brown

from the album Sawyer Brown
- B-side: "Feel Like Me"
- Released: January 28, 1985
- Genre: Country rock, blues rock, rockabilly, rock and roll
- Length: 2:50
- Label: Capitol/Curb 5446
- Songwriter(s): Mark Miller
- Producer(s): Randy Scruggs

Sawyer Brown singles chronology
| "Leona" (1984) | "Step That Step" (1985) | "Used to Blue" (1985) |

"Step That Step" is a song written by Mark Miller, and recorded by American country music group Sawyer Brown. It was released in January 1985 as the second single from their self-titled debut album. It was their first number-one hit on both the Billboard Hot Country Songs chart and the Canadian RPM country singles chart. It would remain their only number-one single until seven years later, when they topped the chart with "Some Girls Do".

== Music video ==
The music video was directed by Mark Rezyka and David Hogan and premiered in February 1985. It was filmed in Los Angeles, California.

== Charts ==
=== Weekly charts ===
| Chart (1985) | Peak position |
|---|---|
| US Hot Country Songs (Billboard) | 1 |
| Canadian RPM Country Tracks | 1 |

=== Year-end charts ===
| Chart (1985) | Position |
|---|---|
| US Hot Country Songs (Billboard) | 30 |
