= She Keeps the Home Fires Burning =

Single by Ronnie Milsap

from the album Greatest Hits, Vol. 2
- B-side: "Is It Over"
- Released: April 6, 1985
- Genre: Country
- Length: 3:55
- Label: RCA Victor
- Songwriters: Dennis Morgan; Mike Reid; Don Pfrimmer
- Producers: Tom Collins; Ronnie Milsap; Rob Galbraith

Ronnie Milsap singles chronology
"Prisoner of the Highway" (1984)	"She Keeps the Home Fires Burning" (1985)	"Lost in the Fifties Tonight (In the Still of the Night)" (1985)

"She Keeps the Home Fires Burning" is a song written by Mike Reid, Don Pfrimmer and Dennis Morgan, and recorded by American country music singer Ronnie Milsap. It was released in April 1985 as the first single from his Greatest Hits, Vol. 2 compilation album.

The song was Milsap's 41st single to be released, and his 26th No. 1 hit on the country charts, the song is highly regarded as one of Milsap's most popular songs. The song is also featured on numerous compilation albums; including 40 #1 Hits and The Essential Ronnie Milsap.

== Charts ==
=== Weekly charts ===
Chart (1985)	Peak position
US Hot Country Songs (Billboard)	1
Canadian RPM Country Tracks	1

=== Year-end charts ===
Chart (1985)	Position
US Hot Country Songs (Billboard)	20
