= Lost in the Fifties Tonight (In the Still of the Night) =

Single by Ronnie Milsap

from the album Greatest Hits, Vol. 2
- B-side: "I Might Have Said"
- Released: July 13, 1985
- Genre: Country, pop, doo-wop
- Length: 4:05
- Label: RCA Victor
- Songwriters: Mike Reid; Troy Seals; Fred Parris ("In the Still of the Night")
- Producers: Tom Collins; Ronnie Milsap; Rob Galbraith

Ronnie Milsap singles chronology
"She Keeps the Home Fires Burning" (1985)	"Lost in the Fifties Tonight (In the Still of the Night)" (1985)	"Happy, Happy Birthday Baby" (1986)

"Lost in the Fifties Tonight (In The Still of the Night)" is a single released by country music singer Ronnie Milsap. It is a medley of "Lost in the Fifties Tonight" written by Mike Reid and Troy Seals and The Five Satins' 1956 hit "In the Still of the Night", written by Five Satins lead singer Fred Parris.

== Success ==
Released in July 1985, the song was Milsap's 42nd single to be released. At the same time, it was also his 27th number-one hit on the Billboard Hot Country Singles and Tracks chart.

Like many of his other singles, the song also fared well as a crossover hit on the Billboard Adult Contemporary charts as it entered the top 10, peaking at number eight. This is his last top-10 single to appear on this chart.

== Critical reception ==
The song was praised by critics and fans alike, and remains one of Milsap's most popular recordings. In a year when 51 songs rotated out of the Hot Country Singles' number-one position, "Lost in the Fifties Tonight" was one of just two songs of the group to spend more than one week at number one (it spent two, as did The Judds' "Have Mercy"), and Milsap's song was the number-one country song of 1985.

That same year, it won Milsap his fourth Grammy Award for "Best Country Vocal Performance" for a male artist. It was also named Song of the Year at the 21st Academy of Country Music Awards in 1986.

== Chart history ==
=== Weekly charts ===
Chart (1985)	Peak position
Australia (Kent Music Report)	66
US Hot Country Songs (Billboard)	1
US Adult Contemporary (Billboard)	8
Canadian RPM Country Tracks	1
Canadian RPM Adult Contemporary Tracks	19

=== Year-end charts ===
Chart (1985)	Rank
US Hot Country Songs (Billboard)	1
