= Country Boy (Ricky Skaggs song) =

Single by Ricky Skaggs

from the album Country Boy
- B-side: "Wheel Hoss"
- Released: February 1985
- Recorded: 1984
- Genre: Country, country rock, bluegrass
- Length: 3:50
- Label: Epic
- Songwriters: Tony Colton; Albert Lee; Ray Smith
- Producer: Ricky Skaggs

Ricky Skaggs singles chronology
"Something in My Heart" (1984)	"Country Boy" (1985)	"You Make Me Feel Like a Man" (1985)

"Country Boy" is a song written by Tony Colton, Albert Lee, and Ray Smith of the British band Heads Hands & Feet, and recorded by American country music artist Ricky Skaggs. It was released in February 1985 as the second single and title track from the album Country Boy. The song was Skaggs' ninth #1 country hit. The single went to #1 for one week and spent a total of 13 weeks on the country chart.

== Music video ==
The music video for "Country Boy" was filmed in New York City. At the beginning of the video, Ricky finishes having a phone conversation, and Uncle Pen (played by Bill Monroe) visits Ricky in his office and talks to him about his country ways. Ricky grabs the guitar and begins to sing. He leads Uncle Pen through New York City's streets, sights, and subways and shows through song and dance that he's still a "country boy at heart". It was directed by Martin Kahan, and produced by Marc Ball. The video includes cameos by Ed Koch, the then-incumbent Mayor of New York City, as a cabdriver, dancer Charlotte d'Amboise, plus actor David Keith who comes in at the end of the video looking for Ricky. The video was one of four nominees for the first "Music Video of the Year" honor presented by the 19th Country Music Association Awards in October 1985. While Skaggs was named "Entertainer of the Year", the "Country Boy" video lost out to "All My Rowdy Friends Are Coming Over Tonight" by Hank Williams, Jr. and director John Goodhue.

== Charts ==
=== Weekly charts ===
Chart (1985)	Peak position
US Hot Country Songs (Billboard)	1
Canadian RPM Country Tracks	1

=== Year-end charts ===
Chart (1985)	Position
US Hot Country Songs (Billboard)	43
