= 40 Hour Week (For a Livin') =

Single by Alabama

from the album 40-Hour Week
- B-side: "As Right Now"
- Released: April 17, 1985 (U.S.)
- Recorded: September 6, 1984
- Genre: Country
- Length: 3:20
- Label: RCA Nashville
- Songwriters: Dave Loggins; Don Schlitz; Lisa Silver
- Producers: Harold Shedd and Alabama

Alabama singles chronology
"There's No Way" (1985)	"40 Hour Week (For a Livin')" (1985)	"Can't Keep a Good Man Down" (1985)

"40 Hour Week (For a Livin')" is a song written by Dave Loggins, Don Schlitz and Lisa Silver, and recorded by American country music band Alabama. It was released in April 1985 as the second single and title track from Alabama's album 40-Hour Week.

== About the song ==
The song, a salute to America's blue-collar workers, became Alabama's 17th No. 1 song on August 3, spending one week atop the chart. The end of the song includes a few bars from "America the Beautiful."

Country music historian Bill Malone, in his liner notes for Classic Country Music: A Smithsonian Collection, wrote that "40 Hour Week (For a Livin')" "...is a rare country music tribute to American workers. (It) probably owes its popularity as much to its patriotic sentiments as to its social concern." Malone also noted that, with few exceptions, "almost no one in country music has spoken for the industrial laborer," one of the main groups of workers Alabama salutes in this song. "This straightforward homage gives the contemporary worker the respect that the Reagan years denied him," Malone concluded.

The song was used by NBC Sports over the closing credits during its broadcast of Super Bowl XX on January 26, 1986. Highlights of the Detroit Lions, Pittsburgh Steelers and Kansas City Chiefs were shown when the refrains mentioning those cities or areas were sung. Highlights of Steelers fans in Three Rivers Stadium were used for the "West Virginia coal miner" refrain, since many residents of West Virginia are Steelers fans.

== Music video ==
A music video was filmed for the song, depicting people working various blue-collar jobs. It was directed by David Hogan and has aired on CMT and Great American Country.

== Alabama vs. Sonny James ==
"40 Hour Week (For a Livin')" is one of the songs central to a point of contention among country music historians. Alabama is frequently billed as having the longest uninterrupted No. 1 streak in the history of the Billboard magazine Hot Country Songs chart, with 21 songs peaking atop the chart between 1980 and 1987, "40 Hour Week (For a Livin')" being the song that set the new standard."

However, the band's 1982 Christmas single, "Christmas in Dixie," peaked at No. 35, bringing about the point of contention. Sonny James, a country music superstar in the 1960s and 1970s, had previously set the standard of most Billboard No. 1 songs with 16 straight without a miss in any single release.

Some sources, including the Alabama Music Hall of Fame web site, state that the failure of "Christmas in Dixie" snapped Alabama's streak before achieving parity with James. Others — such as Joel Whitburn's "Top Country Songs: 1944-2005" — disregard non-No. 1 Christmas singles (such as "Christmas in Dixie") in determining chart-topping streaks and consider Alabama to have surpassed the record.

Several hard-core country fans were quick to point out the discrepancy, but Billboard magazine writer Paul Grein responded, "Only a Scrooge would count that against them." James, on the other hand, attended a celebratory gathering for Alabama's accomplishment and graciously conceded the claim of having the most No. 1 songs without a miss.

== Charts ==
=== Weekly charts ===
Chart (1985)	Peak position
US Hot Country Songs (Billboard)	1
Canadian RPM Country Tracks	1

=== Year-end charts ===
Chart (1985)	Position
US Hot Country Songs (Billboard)	39
