= Dan Seals discography =

- Studio albums: 13
- Compilation albums: 6
- Singles: 37
- Music videos: 12
- No.1 singles: 11

Dan Seals was an American country music artist. Formerly one half of the soft rock duo England Dan & John Ford Coley, Seals split from the duo in 1980 and began a country music career. As a solo artist, Seals released 13 studio albums, six compilation albums, and 37 singles. Eleven of his singles reached number one on the U.S. Billboard country singles charts, including nine consecutive number ones between 1985 and 1989. Seals' best-selling album in the U.S. is 1987's The Best, certified platinum by the RIAA.

== Studio albums ==
=== 1980s albums ===
Title	Album details	Peak chart positions				Certifications (sales thresholds)
Title	Album details	US Country	US	CAN Country	CAN	Certifications (sales thresholds)
Stones	Release date: 1980; Label: Atlantic Records; Formats: LP, cassette	—	—	—	—	
Harbinger	Release date: 1982; Label: Atlantic Records; Formats: LP, cassette	—	—	—	—	
Rebel Heart	Release date: 1983; Label: Liberty Records; Formats: LP, cassette	40	—	—	—	
San Antone	Release date: 1984; Label: EMI America; Formats: LP, cassette	24	—	—	—	
Won't Be Blue Anymore	Release date: 1985; Label: EMI America; Formats: CD, LP, cassette	1	59	—	37	CAN: Platinum; US: Gold
On the Front Line	Release date: 1986; Label: EMI America; Formats: CD, LP, cassette	12	—	—	—	
Rage On	Release date: June 29, 1988; Label: Capitol Records; Formats: CD, LP, cassette	6	—	18	—	
"—" denotes releases that did not chart

=== 1990s albums ===
Title	Album details	Peak chart positions	
Title	Album details	US Country	CAN
On Arrival	Release date: February 28, 1990; Label: Capitol Records; Formats: CD, cassette	13	88
Walking the Wire	Release date: May 12, 1992; Label: Warner Bros. Records; Formats: CD, cassette	—	—
Fired Up	Release date: August 16, 1994; Label: Warner Bros. Records; Formats: CD, cassette	—	—
In a Quiet Room	Release date: October 1, 1995; Label: Intersound Records; Formats: CD, cassette	—	—
In a Quiet Room II	Release date: November 24, 1998; Label: TDC Records; Formats: CD, cassette	—	—
"—" denotes releases that did not chart

=== 2000s albums ===
Title	Album details
Make It Home	Release date: August 27, 2002; Label: Lightyear Records; Formats: CD

== Compilation albums ==
Year	Album details	Peak positions	Certifications (sales threshold)
Year	Album details	US Country	Certifications (sales threshold)
The Best	Release date: October 20, 1987; Label: Capitol Records; Formats: CD, LP, cassette	7	CAN: Gold; US: Platinum
Early Dan Seals	Release date: January 29, 1991; Label: Liberty Records; Formats: CD, cassette	—	
Greatest Hits	Release date: April 23, 1991; Label: Liberty Records; Formats: CD, cassette	—	
The Best of Dan Seals	Release date: June 14, 1994; Label: Curb Records; Formats: CD, cassette	—	
Certified Hits	Release date: August 28, 2001; Label: Capitol Records; Formats: CD	—	
The Best of Dan Seals	Release date: August 2, 2005; Label: Capitol Records; Formats: CD, music download	—	
"—" denotes releases that did not chart

== Singles ==
=== 1980s ===
Year	Single	Peak chart positions					Certifications (sales threshold)	Album
Year	Single	US Country	US	AUS	CAN Country	CAN	Certifications (sales threshold)	Album
1980	"Late at Night"	—	57	—	—	—		Stones
1981	"Stones (Dig a Little Deeper)"	—	—	—	—	—		Stones
1981	"Love Me Like the Last Time"	—	—	—	—	—		Stones
1982	"Can't Get You Out of My Mind"	—	110	—	—	—		Harbinger
1982	"I Could Be Loving You Right Now"	—	—	—	—	—		Harbinger
1983	"Everybody's Dream Girl"	18	—	—	—	—		Rebel Heart
1983	"After You"	28	—	—	30	—		Rebel Heart
1983	"You Really Go for the Heart"	37	—	—	23	—		Rebel Heart
1984	"God Must Be a Cowboy"	10	—	—	8	—		Rebel Heart
1984	"(You Bring Out) The Wild Side of Me"	9	—	—	6	—		San Antone
1984	"My Baby's Got Good Timing"	2	—	—	2	—		San Antone
1985	"My Old Yellow Car"	9	—	—	9	—		San Antone
1985	"Meet Me in Montana" (with Marie Osmond)	1	—	—	19	—		Won't Be Blue Anymore
1985	"Bop"^{[A]}	1	42	41	1	1	CAN: Gold	Won't Be Blue Anymore
1986	"Everything That Glitters (Is Not Gold)"	1	—	—	1	—		Won't Be Blue Anymore
1986	"You Still Move Me"	1	—	—	1	—		On the Front Line
1987	"I Will Be There"	1	—	—	1	—		On the Front Line
1987	"Three Time Loser"	1	—	—	1	—		On the Front Line
1987	"One Friend"	1	—	—	1	—		The Best
1988	"Addicted"	1	—	—	1	—		Rage On
1988	"Big Wheels in the Moonlight"	1	—	—	1	—		Rage On
1989	"They Rage On"	5	—	—	4	—		Rage On
"—" denotes releases that did not chart

=== 1990s ===
Year	Single	Peak chart positions		Album
Year	Single	US Country	CAN Country	Album
1990	"Love on Arrival"	1	1	On Arrival
1990	"Good Times"	1	1	On Arrival
1990	"Bordertown"	49	22	On Arrival
1991	"Water Under the Bridge"	57	33	On Arrival
1991	"Sweet Little Shoe"	62	87	Walking the Wire
1992	"Mason Dixon Line"	43	66	Walking the Wire
1992	"When Love Comes Around the Bend"	51	93	Walking the Wire
1992	"We Are One"	—	—	Walking the Wire
1994	"All Fired Up"	66	—	Fired Up
1994	"Love Thing"	—	—	Fired Up
1995	"The Healing Kind"	—	—	In a Quiet Room
1995	"I'd Really Love to See You Tonight"	—	—	In a Quiet Room
1996	"One Friend" (re-recording)	—	—	In a Quiet Room
1999	"Nights Are Forever Without You"	—	—	In a Quiet Room II
"—" denotes releases that did not chart

== Other singles ==
=== Featured singles ===
Year	Single	Artist	Peak positions
Year	Single	Artist	US Country
1990	"Tomorrow's World"	Various artists	74

== Music videos ==
Year	Video	Director
1985	"Bop"	George Bloom
1986	"Everything That Glitters (Is Not Gold)" (live version)	
1988	"They Rage On"	Neil Abramson
1990	"Tomorrow's World" (Various)	Gustavo Garzon
1991	"God Must Be a Cowboy"^{[B]}	Neil Abramson
1991	"Everything That Glitters (Is Not Gold)" (conceptual version)^{[B]}	Neil Abramson
1991	"Big Wheels in the Moonlight"^{[B]}	Neil Abramson
1992	"Mason Dixon Line"	Wayne Miller
1992	"We Are One"	Wayne Miller
1994	"All Fired Up"	Neal Preston
1994	"Love Thing"	Wayne Miller
1995	"I'd Really Love to See You Tonight" (In a Quiet Room version)	Tom Bevins
1996	"One Friend" (In a Quiet Room version)	Tom Bevins

== See also ==
- England Dan & John Ford Coley

== Notes ==
- A "Bop" also peaked at number 10 on the U.S. Billboard Hot Adult Contemporary Tracks chart and number 6 on the Canadian RPM Adult Contemporary chart.
- B The videos for "God Must Be a Cowboy", "Big Wheels in the Moonlight", and the concept version of "Everything That Glitters (Is Not Gold)" were all filmed specially for Seals' 1991 home video compilation, A Portrait.
