= Greatest Hits (Dan Seals album) =

Greatest hits album by Dan Seals
- Released: 1991
- Genre: Country
- Length: 39:14
- Label: Capitol
- Producer: Kyle Lehning

Dan Seals chronology
On Arrival (1990)	Greatest Hits (1991)	Walking the Wire (1992)

Professional ratings
Review scores
Source	Rating
Allmusic	3/5 stars

Greatest Hits is the second compilation album from American country music singer Dan Seals. It features his hits from his previous studio albums such as Won't Be Blue Anymore, Rage On, and On Arrival. All tracks were previously released except for the track "Ball and Chain", which was previously unreleased, and newly recorded for this Greatest Hits album. This album peaked at #15 on the Country albums chart.

== Track listing ==
No.	Title	Writer(s)	Length
1.	"Love on Arrival"	Dan Seals	3:49
2.	"Big Wheels in the Moonlight"	Bob McDill, Seals	3:49
3.	"Addicted"	Cheryl Wheeler	4:11
4.	"Everything That Glitters (Is Not Gold)"	McDill, Seals	4:50
5.	"Bop"	Paul Davis, Jennifer Kimball	3:37
6.	"Good Times"	Sam Cooke	3:34
7.	"Bordertown"	McDill, Seals	3:56
8.	"They Rage On"	McDill, Seals	4:38
9.	"Water Under the Bridge"	John Porter McMeans, Bruce Burch	3:06
10.	"Ball and Chain"	Seals	3:44
