= The Best (Dan Seals album) =

Greatest hits album by Dan Seals
- Released: October 20, 1987
- Genre: Country
- Length: 41:10
- Label: Capitol
- Producer: Kyle Lehning

Dan Seals chronology
On the Front Line (1986)	The Best (1987)	Rage On (1988)

Singles from The Best
- 1. "One Friend" Released: September 1987

Professional ratings
Review scores
Source	Rating
Allmusic	4/5 stars

The Best is the first compilation album by American country music artist Dan Seals. It features his highest charting songs from his previous four albums beginning with Rebel Heart (1983). The album has been certified platinum. The new track, "One Friend" was originally found on his 1984 album San Antone, and was re-recorded for this album, and was released as a single and became his seventh number one song in a row.

== Track listing ==
No.	Title	Writer(s)	Length
1.	"Three Time Loser"	Dan Seals	3:04
2.	"God Must Be a Cowboy"	Seals	3:05
3.	"My Baby's Got Good Timing"	McDill, Seals	3:27
4.	"You Still Move Me"	Seals	5:07
5.	"Bop"	Jennifer Kimball, Paul Davis	3:45
6.	"Everything That Glitters (Is Not Gold)"	Seals, Bob McDill	4:50
7.	"Meet Me in Montana" (duet with Marie Osmond)	Davis	3:54
8.	"(You Bring Out) The Wild Side of Me"	Seals	3:21
9.	"My Old Yellow Car"	Thom Schuyler	3:36
10.	"I Will Be There"	Tom Snow, Jennifer Kimball	3:49
11.	"One Friend"	Seals	3:13

== Personnel on Track 11 ==
Adapted from liner notes.

- Dan Seals – lead and backing vocals, acoustic guitar
- Dennis Burnside – acoustic piano
- Shane Keister – synthesizers
- Larry Byrom – electric guitar
- Mark Casstevens – acoustic guitar
- Steve Gibson – acoustic guitar
- Jack Williams – bass guitar
- Eddie Bayers – drums
- Scott Kaufman – percussion
- Bergen White – string arrangements
- The Nashville String Machine – strings
- Marshall Morgan – tracking engineer
- Kyle Lehning – mix engineer, overdub engineer
- Kirt Odle – mix engineer, overdub engineer
- Track recorded at Audio Media Recorders (Nashville, Tennessee).
- Overdubbed and Mixed at Morningstar Sound Studio (Hendersonville, Tennessee).

Additional credits

- Doug Sax – mastering at The Mastering Lab (Hollywood, California)
- Bonnie Rasmussen – album project coordinator
- Virginia Team – art direction
- Jerry Joyner – design
- Larry Dixon – photography
- Vanessa Ware – stylist
- Larry Gottlieb – management

== Charts ==
=== Weekly charts ===
Chart (1987–1988)	Peak position
US Top Country Albums (Billboard)	7

=== Year-end charts ===
Chart (1988)	Position
US Top Country Albums (Billboard)	25
Chart (1991)	Position
US Top Country Albums (Billboard)	63

== Certifications ==
Region	Certification	Certified units/sales
Canada (Music Canada)	Gold	50,000^{^}
United States (RIAA)	Platinum	1,000,000^{^}
^{^} Shipments figures based on certification alone.
