= In a Quiet Room II =

Studio album by Dan Seals
- Released: November 24, 1998
- Studio: Morningstar Sound Studio (Hendersonville, Tennessee)
- Genre: Country
- Length: 38:47
- Label: TDC
- Producer: Tim Kish Dan Seals

Dan Seals chronology
In a Quiet Room (1995)	In a Quiet Room II (1998)	Certified Hits (2001)

Professional ratings
Review scores
Source	Rating
AllMusic	link

In a Quiet Room II is the twelfth album released by country music artist Dan Seals and his only album on the TDC label. This album is his second album of acoustic versions of his older songs and a sequel to his previous album, In a Quiet Room. No singles were released from this album. Alison Krauss and Pam Tillis sing background vocals on several songs.

== Track listing ==
1. "L.O.A. (Love on Arrival)" (Dan Seals) – 4:37
2. "God Must Be a Cowboy at Heart" (Seals) – 3:15
3. "Nights Are Forever Without You" (Parker McGee) – 3:26
4. "My Baby's Got Good Timing" (Bob McDill, Seals) – 3:07
5. "Addicted" (Cheryl Wheeler) – 3:58
6. "We Are One" (Seals) – 3:58
7. "Still Reelin' (From Those Rock & Roll Days)" (Seals, Allen Shamblin) – 4:56
8. "Three Time Loser" (Seals) – 3:11
9. "My Old Yellow Car" (Thom Schuyler) – 4:07
10. "Wood" (Seals) – 4:12

== Personnel ==
- Dan Seals – vocals, backing vocals, guitars
- Mark Casstevens – guitars
- Chris Leuzinger – guitars
- Paul Franklin – pedabro
- Viktor Krauss – bass
- Mark W. Winchester – bass
- Tom Roady – percussion
- Jim Horn – saxophone
- Andrea Zonn – viola, violin
- Alison Krauss – backing vocals
- Pam Tillis – backing vocals
- Dennis Wilson – backing vocals
- Curtis Young – backing vocals

=== Production ===
- Dan Seals – producer
- Tim Kish – associate producer, engineer, mixing
- Jason Lehning – engineer
- Rocky Schnaars – engineer
- Randy LeRoy – mastering at Final Stage Mastering (Nashville, Tennessee)
- Virginia Team – art direction
- Gwendolen Cates – photography
- Morningstar Management – management
