= In a Quiet Room =

Studio album by Dan Seals
- Released: August 29, 1995
- Recorded: 1995
- Studio: Morningstar Sound Studio (Hendersonville, Tennessee)
- Genre: Country
- Length: 36:11
- Label: Intersound
- Producer: Tim Kish Dan Seals

Dan Seals chronology
Fired Up (1994)	In a Quiet Room (1995)	In a Quiet Room II (1998)

In a Quiet Room is the eleventh album released by country music artist Dan Seals and his only album on the Intersound label. This album consists mostly of acoustic versions of songs featured on earlier albums, as well as two songs — "I'd Really Love to See You Tonight" and "Love Is the Answer" — that he originally recorded as one-half of the soft rock duo England Dan & John Ford Coley. "I'd Really Love to See You Tonight" and "The Healin' Kind" were both released as singles.

== Critical reception ==
Professional ratings
Review scores
Source	Rating
AllMusic	2/5 stars

Thom Owens of AllMusic gave the album two stars out of five, saying, "It's a pleasant album, yet it doesn't offer any new revelations or great performances." New Country magazine reviewer Rob Patterson gave the album two-and-a-half stars out of five, saying that the re-recordings were largely identical to the original versions, and that Seals occasionally sounded like a soft rock artist.

== Track listing ==
1. "I'd Really Love to See You Tonight" (Parker McGee) - 2:57
2. "Everything That Glitters (Is Not Gold)" (Dan Seals, Bob McDill) - 2:57
3. "Big Wheels in the Moonlight" (McDill, Seals) - 3:52
4. "One Friend" (Seals) - 3:14
5. "Bop" (Jennifer Kimball, Paul Davis) - 3:10
6. "You Still Move Me" (Seals) - 4:53
7. "Love Is the Answer" (Todd Rundgren) - 4:08
8. "They Rage On" (McDill, Seals) - 4:48
9. "The Healin' Kind" (feat. Alison Krauss) (Ronnie Bowman, Greg Luck) - 3:02
10. "Don't Believe I'd Fall in Love Again" (Seals, Rafe Van Hoy) - 3:10

== Personnel ==
- Dan Seals – vocals, backing vocals, guitars
- Mark Casstevens – guitars
- Steve Gibson – guitars
- Chris Leuzinger – guitars
- Billy Joe Walker Jr. – guitars
- Jerry Douglas – dobro
- Paul Franklin – pedabro
- Sam Bush – mandolin
- Dan Tyminski – mandolin, backing vocals
- Viktor Krauss – string bass
- Craig Nelson – string bass
- Stuart Duncan – fiddle
- Gary Burr – backing vocals
- Alison Krauss – backing vocals, vocals (9)

=== Production ===
- Dan Seals – producer
- Tim Kish – associate producer, engineer, mixing
- Kirt Odle – engineer
- Jason Lehning – assistant engineer
- Randy LeRoy – mastering at Final Stage Mastering (Nashville, Tennessee)
- Virginia Team – art direction
- Elizabeth Workman – design
- Gwendolen Cates – photography
- Morningstar Management – management
