= There's No Stopping Your Heart =

Studio album by Marie Osmond
- Released: July 1985
- Recorded: November 1984–May 1985
- Genres: Country; country pop
- Labels: Capitol; Curb
- Producers: Kyle Lehning; Paul Worley

Marie Osmond chronology
This is the Way That I Feel (1977)	There's No Stopping Your Heart (1985)	I Only Wanted You (1986)

Singles from There's No Stopping Your Heart
- 1. "Until I Fall in Love Again" Released: January 1985; 2. "Meet Me in Montana" Released: July 1985; 3. "There's No Stopping Your Heart" Released: September 1985; 4. "Read My Lips" Released: February 1986

There's No Stopping Your Heart is a studio album by American singer Marie Osmond. It was released by the Capitol and Curb record labels in July 1985. The album was part of Osmond's commercial return in the country music genre. It brought three top ten US and Canadian country singles: "Meet Me in Montana", "There's No Stopping Your Heart", and "Read My Lips". The album reached the top 20 of the US country chart and was met with positive reviews from music publications.

== Background, recording and content ==
Part of the Osmond entertainment family, Marie Osmond established herself as a country artist apart from her brothers. Her debut single "Paper Roses" (1973) topped the country charts and reached the top five on the pop charts when she was a teenager. She moved away from country as she took interest in television, films and other entertainment venues. As an adult, Osmond, chose to return as a country recording artist in the 1980s. Along with Tanya Tucker, Jim Foglesong of Capitol Records signed Osmond to a recording contract and ultimately revived both their careers.

Sessions for Osmond's debut album were recorded between November 1984 and May 1985. The album was produced mostly by Paul Worley, with one track produced by Kyle Lehning. The album's tracks were considered to be "laid back" and evoke a country pop style. A total of ten tracks comprised the project. Of these was a duet with Dan Seals titled "Meet Me in Montana". The song would also be included on Seals' studio album Won't Be Blue Anymore. Another track, "Read My Lips", was first recorded by Dottie West for her 1983 album New Horizons. "Love Will Find Its Way to You" was first cut by Osmond and would later be a number one single for Reba McEntire.

== Release and critical reception ==
Professional ratings
Review scores
Source	Rating
Allmusic	4/5 stars

There's No Stopping Your Heart was released in July 1985 in a joint venture between Capitol and Curb Records. It was issued in three different formats: a vinyl LP, an cassette and a compact disc. Decades later, it was re-released to digital platforms by Curb Records. The album was met with a positive reception. Cashbox praised the album, finding that any of its ten tracks were a "good candidate" for being a single. Further, the publication commented, "Osmond’s well recognized voice is at home with the material on this record indicating that she is at her finest as a country vocalist." It was given four out of five stars from AllMusic's Charlotte Dillon, who had a similar finding: "That little girl with a beaming smile and plenty of brothers is now a grown woman with a lovely voice and seven children of her own. The tunes on this album are simple country-pop, many with meaningful, and often touching, lyrics."

== Chart performance and singles ==
There's No Stopping Your Heart made its debut on the US Top Country Albums chart on September 7, 1985. It spent a total of 43 weeks on the chart, rising to the number 19 position in November 1985. It was Osmond's longest-running album on the country chart during her career. A total of four singles were part of There's No Stopping Your Heart. The first was "Until I Fall in Love Again", which was issued in January 1985. It reached the number 54 position that year on the US Hot Country Songs chart.

Its second single was the Seals-Osmond duet of "Meet Me in Montana". Capitol issued the song in May 1985. It became Osmond's second number one single on the US country chart, while also rising to number 19 on the Canadian Country Tracks chart. Released in September 1985 was the title track, which was a solo release. The song became Osmond's third number one single on the US country chart and her second number one on the Canadian country chart. The fourth and final single was "Read My Lips" in March 1986. It reached number four on the US country chart and number five on the Canadian country chart.

== Track listing ==
There's No Stopping Your Heart (LP, CD and cassette)
No.	Title	Writer(s)	Length
1.	"There's No Stopping Your Heart"	Michael Bonagura; Craig Karp	2:53
2.	"Needing a Night Like This"	Deborah Allen; Eddie Struzick; Rafe Van Hoy	2:54
3.	"Read My Lips"	Marc Blatte; Larry Gottlieb	3:48
4.	"The Best of You"	Mary Ann Kennedy; Pam Rose; Thom Schuyler	3:43
5.	"I'll Be Faithful to You"	Paul Kennerley	3:08
6.	"Meet Me in Montana" (duet with Dan Seals)	Paul Davis	3:56
7.	"That Old Devil Moon"	Holly Dunn	2:51
8.	"Love Will Find Its Way to You"	Dave Loggins; J. D. Martin	3:35
9.	"Until I Fall in Love Again"	Larry Boone; Dave Gibson	3:14
10.	"Blue Sky Shinin'"	Mickey Newbury	2:50

== Charts ==
=== Weekly charts ===
Chart (1985)	Peak position
US Top Country Albums (Billboard)	16

=== Year-end charts ===
Chart (1986)	Position
US Top Country Albums (Billboard)	42

== Release history ==
Region	Date	Format	Label	Ref.
Australia	July 1985	Vinyl LP	Capitol Records	
Europe	July 1985	Vinyl LP	Capitol Records	
North America	July 1985	Vinyl LP; cassette; compact disc	Capitol Records; Curb Records	
South Africa	July 1985	Vinyl LP	Capitol Records	
North America	circa 2020	Music download; streaming	Curb Records	
