= Larrie Londin =

American drummer

- Born: Ralph Gallant; October 15, 1943; Norfolk, Virginia, U.S.
- Died: August 24, 1992 (aged 48) Nashville, Tennessee, U.S.
- Genres: Country; rock
- Occupations: Drummer; session musician
- Instruments: Drums; percussion
- Years active: 1957–1992
- Formerly of: The Notorious Cherry Bombs

Ralph Gallant (October 15, 1943 − August 24, 1992), known professionally as Larrie Londin, was an American drummer and session musician. According to journalist James Byron Fox, "If not the best known, Larrie is one of the most listened to drummers in the world. He played on more hit records during his career than any other drummer, with the exception of the legendary session drummer Hal Blaine, and his work covers the complete musical spectrum."

== History ==
=== Early life ===
Larrie Londin began playing drums at the age of 15, and was largely self-taught. Londin initially planned to be a singer, and had an early recording contract with Atlantic Records, but decided to stay loyal to the band The Headliners and signed with Motown under the VIP label.

Londin's first professional drumming engagement was in Norfolk, Virginia, in a club where he was a cook and dishwasher. One night, the engagement drummer did not show up, and Londin substituted.

The full story is that Eugene Bunten hatched a plan for Larry to play drums as the younger brother of Lonnie Londin (Eugene E. Bunten) because Larry was underage. From then they became Lonnie and Larry Londin. Lonnie went back to his roots in North Conway playing in local bars - where he was known as "the last great unknown".

=== Motown ===
As young men, Larrie Londin and his brother, Lonnie Londin, a.k.a. Eugene E. Bunten (Kenya Bunten) (March 28, 1939 − February 16, 2020), were members of The Headliners, the first white act to be signed to a Motown record label. In 1965, two singles were released by the Headliners.

During his time at Motown, Londin commenced his career as a session drummer, following a heart attack suffered by Funk Brothers session drummer Benny Benjamin. Motown owner Berry Gordy asked Londin to play at various sessions, rather than cancel them, due to Benjamin's health challenges. Londin played drums on recordings by The Supremes, Marvin Gaye, The Temptations and Jr. Walker & the All Stars. Though credited to Benny Benjamin, it is asserted that it was Londin who played drums on Jr. Walker's hit song "Shotgun".

=== Nashville ===
After his time at Motown, Londin joined the band of the Tennessee Ernie Ford television show. Fox states, "He went from being one of Nashville's only drummers to being Country Music's top studio drummer."

Encouraged by guitarist Chet Atkins and singer-guitarist Jerry Reed, Londin moved to Nashville in 1969, and grew to be regarded as Nashville's top session drummer. In 1991, Atkins publicly introduced him as "the greatest drummer in the world". Londin was considered to be a "master class" drummer, and made appearances on the "drum clinic" circuit.

Londin was known to practice eight to twelve hours a day. He was also one of the first American drummers to record extensively with electronic drums. Commencing as of the 1970s, Londin was a contract session drummer for Columbia Records, playing on both country and rock recordings.

With his wife, Debbie Gallant, Londin established D.O.G. Percussion (named for Debbie's initials), the area's first dedicated drum shop, which was of interest to a wide range of musicians. For example, at the suggestion of Londin, Hee Haw banjo player Bobby Thompson went to D.O.G. Percussion to add a FiberSkyn head to his banjo. Always promoting innovation in the session business, Londin mentored younger musicians and proposed the first cartage services for Nashville session players. One notable drummer whom Londin mentored was Eddie Bayers, now a top Nashville session drummer in his own right.

While not being able to formally read music, Londin developed "stick charts", which he used to remind himself of approaches to certain songs for which he was contracted as a session drummer. According to Londin, such "stick charts" were common among Nashville session drummers, but not widely known or understood otherwise. Londin acknowledged that he had obtained a rudimentary knowledge of music charts from Master Chief Musician Kenny Malone, who had previously been head of the percussion department at the U.S. Navy School of Music at Little Creek, Virginia, and came to Nashville as a session musician.

=== With Elvis Presley ===
Londin worked on a handful of Elvis Presley studio and live sessions, albeit in an overdubbing capacity at the behest of Presley’s producer, Felton Jarvis. One notable recording on which Londin appears is the 1980 remix version of "Guitar Man", which was the singer's final No. 1 single on the country charts. He substituted for Presley’s long-time drummer Ronnie Tutt in the TCB Band briefly in 1976 and 1977, resulting in Londin playing at Presley's last two concerts, prior to Presley's death, in Cincinnati and Indianapolis. Londin can be heard prominently playing with Presley on A New Kind Of Rhythm! (Madison Records, 2007), a bootleg recording of a 1976 Presley concert at the Riverfront Coliseum in Cincinnati.

Londin stated: "I've had offers to write a book about Elvis, but you know, they really didn't want to publish the stories I had to tell. They only wanted the dirt – the scandal. I never saw him use drugs and I never saw him being mean to people. He had problems, everybody does, but he was a sweet guy – real religious, and he was patriotic, he really loved America. The publishers said nobody wants to read about that stuff. I just couldn't be a part of another book trashing him, he was a real good guy and he was always nice to me."

=== Session musician engagements ===
In the 1980s, Londin was a member of The Cherry Bombs, the backing band for Rodney Crowell. As a session musician, Londin played with a wide range of artists from a variety of musical styles, including Emmylou Harris, Diana Ross, The Supremes, The Temptations, The Four Tops, Martha Reeves, The Vandellas, Smokey Robinson, Joe Tex, Wilson Pickett, Lionel Richie, Carpenters, Jerry Lee Lewis, Boots Randolph, Charlie Pride, Randy Travis, Porter Wagoner, Dolly Parton, B.B. King, Albert Lee, Larry Carlton, Lee Ritenour, England Dan & John Ford Coley, Bobby Bare, Merle Haggard, Hank Snow, Jerry Reed, Rosanne Cash, Al Green, Don Francisco, Dan Fogelberg, Reba McEntire, KT Oslin, Vince Gill, Ricky Skaggs, Hank Williams, Jr., Chet Atkins, Ronnie Milsap, Dan Hill, Fosterchild, Journey and Steve Perry. Londin demonstrated the diversity of his playing ability through playing jazz fusion with ex-King Crimson guitarist Adrian Belew. In the years prior to his death, Londin also recorded and toured with the Everly Brothers.

=== Death and posthumous honors ===
On April 24, 1992, Londin suffered a heart attack and collapsed during a drum clinic at the University of North Texas. On August 24, 1992, after spending four months in a coma, Londin died in Nashville, Tennessee, at the age of 48.

In 1994, Londin was posthumously inducted into the Hall of Fame of Modern Drummer magazine, in response to the magazine's annual readers poll.

In 1999, a benefit concert was held, co-sponsored by the Percussive Arts Society and Sabian, the cymbal manufacturer with which Londin had been associated, to raise money for musician scholarships. Drummers Dom Famularo, Terry Bozzio, Chester Thompson, and Will Calhoun and the percussion group Hip Pickles appeared. An audio and video cassette of the benefit concert were released in 1999. The scholarship program continues to offer scholarships as of 2012.

== Discography ==
With Barbi Benton

- Barbi Benton (Playboy Records, 1975)

With Glen Campbell

- Walkin' in the Sun (Capitol Records, 1990)

With The Carpenters

- Voice of the Heart (A&M Records, 1983)

With Johnny Cash

- Rockabilly Blues (Columbia Records, 1980)

With Rosanne Cash

- Seven Year Ache (Columbia Records, 1981)
- Somewhere in the Stars (Columbia Records, 1982)

With Linda Clifford

- My Heart's on Fire (Red Label, 1985)

With Rosemary Clooney

- Look My Way (United Artists Records, 1976)

With Joe Cocker

- Civilized Man (Capitol Records, 1984)

With Perry Como

- Just Out of Reach (RCA Victor, 1975)

With Rodney Crowell

- But What Will the Neighbors Think (Warner Bros. Records, 1980)
- Street Language (CBS Records, 1986)
- Life Is Messy (Columbia Records, 1992)

With England Dan & John Ford Coley

- Nights Are Forever (Big Tree Records, 1976)
- Dowdy Ferry Road (Big Tree Records, 1977)
- Some Things Don't Come Easy (Big Tree Records, 1978)

With Gail Davies

- Gail Davies (Lifesong, 1978)

With Don Everly

- Brother Jukebox (Hickory Records, 1977)

With The Everly Brothers

- Pass the Chicken & Listen (RCA Records, 1972)
- Born Yesterday (Mercury Records, 1986)
- Some Hearts (Mercury Records, 1988)

With Glenn Frey

- The Allnighter (MCA Records, 1984)

With Vince Gill

- Turn Me Loose (RCA Records, 1984)
- The Things That Matter (RCA Records, 1985)
- Pocket Full of Gold (MCA Records, 1991)

With Crystal Gayle

- These Days (Columbia Records, 1980)

With Amy Grant

- Amy Grant (Myrrh Records, 1977)

With Al Green

- Precious Lord (Myrrh Records, 1982)

With Emmylou Harris

- Evangeline (Warner Bros. Records, 1981)
- The Ballad of Sally Rose (Warner Bros. Records, 1985)

With Dan Hill

- Hold On (20th Century Records, 1976)
- Longer Fuse (Interfusion, 1977)
- Frozen in the Night (GRT, 1978)
- If Dreams Had Wings (Epic Records, 1980)

With Journey

- Raised on Radio (Columbia Records, 1986)

With B. B. King

- Love Me Tender (MCA Records, 1982)

With Mark Knopfler

- Neck and Neck (Columbia Records, 1990)

With Bonnie Koloc

- You're Gonna Love Yourself in the Morning (Ovation Records, 1974)

With Al Kooper

- Act Like Nothing's Wrong (United Artists Records, 1977)

With Bill LaBounty

- This Night Won't Last Forever (Warner Bros. Records, 1978)

With Jim Lauderdale

- Planet of Love (Reprise Records, 1991)

With Lonnie Mack

- Home at Last (Capitol Records, 1977)

With Kenny Marks

- Another Friday Night (DaySpring Records, 1989)

With Dean Martin

- Once in a While (Reprise Records, 1978)

With Frankie Miller

- Easy Money (Chrysalis Records, 1980)

With Ronnie Milsap

- 20/20 Vision (RCA Records, 1976)
- Images (RCA Records, 1979)
- Milsap Magic (RCA Victor, 1980)
- Inside (RCA Records, 1982)
- Keyed Up (RCA Records, 1983)
- One More Try for Love (RCA Records, 1984)
- Lost in the Fifties Tonight (RCA Records, 1986)
- Heart & Soul (RCA Records, 1987)
- Stranger Things Have Happened (RCA Records, 1989)

With Willie Nelson

- A Horse Called Music (Columbia Records, 1989)

With Michael Nesmith

- From a Radio Engine to the Photon Wing (Pacific Arts, 1977)

With Olivia Newton-John

- Don't Stop Believin' (Interfusion, 1976)

With Dolly Parton

- Jolene (RCA Victor, 1974)
- New Harvest...First Gathering (RCA Victor, 1977)

With Steve Perry

- Street Talk (Columbia Records, 1984)

With Eddie Rabbitt

- Rocky Mountain Music (Elektra Records, 1976)
- Rabbitt (Elektra Records, 1977)

With Ronna Reeves

- The More I Learn (Mercury Records, 1992)

With Kenny Rogers

- I Prefer the Moonlight (RCA Records, 1987)

With Dan Seals

- Stones (Atlantic Records, 1980)
- Harbinger (Atlantic Records, 1982)
- Rebel Heart (Liberty Records, 1983)
- San Antone (EMI, 1984)
- Won't Be Blue Anymore (EMI, 1985)
- On the Front Line (EMI, 1986)
- Rage On (Capitol Records, 1988)
- On Arrival (Capitol Records, 1990)
- Walking the Wire (Warner Bros. Records, 1992)

With B. W. Stevenson

- Lost Feeling (Warner Bros. Records, 1977)

With Shania Twain

- Shania Twain (Mercury Records, 1993)

With Tanya Tucker

- Here's Some Love (MCA Records, 1976)

With Neil Young

- Comes a Time (Reprise Records, 1978)

With Rusty Wier

- Rusty Wier (20th Century Records, 1975)

With Kelly Willis

- Bang Bang (MCA Records, 1991)

== See also ==
- The Nashville A-Team
