= James Stroud =

American musician and record producer (born 1949)

- Genres: Country, R&B, Soul, Disco
- Occupations: Session musician, record producer
- Instrument: Drums
- Years active: 1960s-present

James Stroud is an American musician and record producer who works in pop, rock, R&B, soul, disco, and country music. He played with the Malaco Rhythm Section for Malaco Records. In the 1990s, he was the president of Giant Records (a subsidiary of Warner Bros. Records) and held several credits as a session drummer. He later worked for DreamWorks Records Nashville and in 2008 founded his own label, Stroudavarious Records.

== Biography ==
Stroud began playing drums at local bar bands in Texas and Louisiana. Stroud worked with musicians such as Paul Davis in the 1960s. He and Davis also took on songwriting duties for Jackson, Mississippi-based Malaco Records. He played with and produced many acts throughout the 1960s and 1970s. While involved at Malaco, he worked with R&B artists, including Dorothy Moore, King Floyd, Frederick Knight, Jackie Moore, The Controllers, Fern Kinney, and Anita Ward. He co-produced and played on Dorothy Moore's "Misty Blue", which was a major US and UK hit, going on to sell over four million copies.

He was also a session musician, in which he played guitar, drums and keyboards. He also started playing drums and synthesizer with Paul Davis, taking influences from rock and R&B artists. In the early-1980s, he began playing for Eddie Rabbitt. From there, Stroud had become a prolific session drummer in Nashville, Tennessee, backing Ronnie Milsap, K.T. Oslin and others. He was also a member of the Marshall Tucker Band.

In the late-1980s, Stroud founded The Writers' Group, a publishing company. He also took up producing, and in 1989 was named by the Academy of Country Music as Producer of the Year. When Warner Bros. Records founded the Giant Records branch, Stroud became president of the new label and produced several of its acts, including Carlene Carter, Dennis Robbins, Tracy Lawrence, Daryle Singletary, Daron Norwood and Clay Walker. At the same time, he produced acts not signed to the label. Between 1993 and 1994, twenty-one singles produced by Stroud reached the top of the country charts.

After Giant Records closed in 2000, Stroud moved to DreamWorks Records Nashville, where he worked as a producer for several artists including Darryl Worley. After the label closed down in 2005, Stroud joined Universal Music Group (DreamWorks' parent company) and served as co-CEO alongside Luke Lewis until 2007. In July 2008 he founded a new label, Stroudavarious Records, to which he signed Worley as the flagship artist.

== Collaborations ==
With Alabama

- The Touch (RCA Records, 1986)
- When It All Goes South (RCA Records, 2001)

With Joan Baez

- Play Me Backwards (Virgin Records, 1992)

With Glen Campbell

- Walkin' in the Sun (Capitol Records, 1990)
- Unconditional Love (Liberty Records, 1991)

With Joe Cocker

- Civilized Man (Capitol Records, 1984)

With Mark Collie

- Tennessee Plates (Giant, 1995)

With Crystal Gayle

- True Love (Elektra Records, 1982)
- Straight to the Heart (Warner Bros. Records, 1986)

With Patrick Hernandez

- Born to Be Alive (Columbia Records, 1979)

With High Inergy

- High Inergy (Gordy, 1981)

With Nick Kamen

- Nick Kamen (WEA, 1987)

With Toby Keith

- Shock'n Y'all (DreamWorks Records, 2003)

With Gladys Knight & the Pips

- Visions (Columbia Records, 1983)

With Jean Knight

- Mr. Big Stuff (Stax Records, 1971)

With Nicolette Larson

- ...Say When (MCA Records, 1985)

With Tracy Lawrence

- Sticks and Stones (Atlantic Records, 1991)
- Alibis (Atlantic Records, 1993)
- I See It Now (Atlantic Records, 1994)

With Melissa Manchester

- Melissa Manchester (Arista Records, 1979)
- For the Working Girl (Arista Records, 1980)

With Dean Martin

- The Nashville Sessions (Warner Bros. Records, 1983)

With Mac McAnally

- Nothing but the Truth (Geffen, 1983)

With Neal McCoy

- Where Forever Begin (Atlantic Records, 1992)

With Tim McGraw

- Tim McGraw (Curb Records, 1993)

With Bill Medley

- Still Hung Up for You (RCA Records, 1985)

With Ronnie Milsap

- Keyed Up (RCA Records, 1983)
- One More Try for Love (RCA Records, 1984)

With Jackie Moore

- Sweet Charlie Babe (Atlantic Records, 1973)

With Michael Martin Murphey

- River of Time (Warner Bros. Records, 1988)

With Anne Murray

- Heart over Mind (Capitol Records, 1984)

With Wayne Newton

- Coming Home (Curb Records, 1989)

With The Oak Ridge Boys

- Seasons (MCA Records, 1985)
- Christmas Again (MCA Records, 1986)

With Nigel Olsson

- Nigel Olsson (Columbia Records, 1978)
- Nigel (Bang Records, 1979)
- Changing Tides (Epic Records, 1980)

With Eddie Rabbitt

- Horizon (Elektra Records, 1980)
- Step by Step (Elektra Records, 1981)
- Radio Romance (Warner Bros. Records, 1982)
- I Wanna Dance with You (RCA Records, 1988)

With Lou Rawls

- When the Night Comes (Epic Records, 1983)

With Dennis Robbins

- Man With a Plan (Giant, 1992)
- Born Ready (Giant, 1994)

With Bruce Roberts

- Cool Fool (Elektra Records, 1980)

With Kenny Rogers

- I Prefer the Moonlight (RCA Records, 1987)
- If Only My Heart Had a Voice (Giant, 1993)

With Dan Seals

- Stones (Atlantic Records, 1980)
- Harbinger (Atlantic Records, 1982)
- Rebel Heart (Liberty Records, 1983)
- On the Front Line (EMI, 1986)

With Paul Simon

- There Goes Rhymin' Simon (Columbia Records, 1973)

With Tanya Tucker

- Changes (Arista Records, 1982)
- Girls Like Me (Capitol Records, 1986)
- Love Me Like You Used To (Capitol Records, 1987)
- Strong Enough to Bend (Capitol Records, 1988)

With Dionne Warwick

- No Night So Long (Arista Records, 1980)

With Carl Wilson

- Carl Wilson (Caribou Records, 1981)
