= Rage On =

Studio album by Dan Seals
- Released: June 29, 1988
- Recorded: 1987
- Studio: Nightingale Studio and GroundStar Laboratories (Nashville, Tennessee); Morningstar Sound Studio (Hendersonville, Tennessee)
- Genre: Country
- Length: 41:21
- Label: Capitol
- Producer: Kyle Lehning

Dan Seals chronology
The Best (1987)	Rage On (1988)	On Arrival (1990)

Singles from Rage On
- 1. "Addicted" Released: May 1988; 2. "Big Wheels in the Moonlight" Released: September 1988; 3. "They Rage On" Released: February 1989

Rage On is the seventh studio album by American country music artist Dan Seals, released on June 29, 1988, by Capitol Records. The album charted at number 6 on the Top Country Albums chart, his second highest-charting album since Won't Be Blue Anymore in 1985. The Singles released were "Addicted", "Big Wheels in the Moonlight", and "They Rage On"; the first two both went to Number One on Hot Country Songs and the title track peaked at number five on the same chart.

Brian Mansfield of AllMusic said that the songs were "woven around traditional country themes while rarely resorting to country clichés."

== Track listing ==
No.	Title	Writer(s)	Length
1.	"Big Wheels in the Moonlight"	Bob McDill, Dan Seals	3:54
2.	"They Rage On"	McDill, Seals	4:40
3.	"Five Generations of Rock County Wilsons"	John Scott Sherrill	3:14
4.	"Twenty-Four Hour Love"	Mac McAnally, Seals	4:07
5.	"Factory Town"	Seals	3:49
6.	"Addicted"	Cheryl Wheeler	4:15
7.	"A Heartache Just Around the Bend"	Paul Davis, Jennifer Kimball	3:45
8.	"Maybe I'm Missing You Now"	Blackie Farrell, Kimball	3:22
9.	"Fool Me Once, Fool Me Twice"	K. T. Oslin, William Soden	3:45
10.	"Long Long Island Nights"	McDill, Seals	4:41
11.	"Those"	Seals	3:14

== Personnel ==
As listed in liner notes.

=== Musicians ===
- Dan Seals – vocals, acoustic guitar (2, 5), backing vocals (4, 5)
- Shane Keister – keyboards (1, 3–5, 10), synthesizers (2, 6, 8), acoustic piano (6, 8, 11)
- Mike Lawler – keyboards (4, 5, 7), drum programming (7)
- Dennis Burnside – electric piano (6, 8, 11), acoustic piano (9), keyboards (10)
- Mark Casstevens – acoustic guitar (1–4, 6, 8–11), guitars (7)
- Don Potter – acoustic guitar (1)
- Brent Mason – electric rhythm guitar (1)
- Kenny Mims – electric rhythm guitar (1), electric guitar (6)
- Billy Joe Walker Jr. – electric rhythm guitar (1), electric guitar (2, 6)
- Joe Stanley – guitar solo (1), electric guitar (5, 9), guitars (7)
- Steve Gibson – acoustic guitar (3), electric guitar (4, 8, 10, 11)
- Larry Byrom – acoustic guitar (6, 8, 10, 11), electric guitar (10)
- Doyle Grisham – steel guitar (3, 4, 8, 10, 11)
- Paul Franklin – steel guitar (9)
- Mark O'Connor – fiddle (2, 3, 8, 11), mandolin (2)
- Mike Brignardello – bass (1)
- David Hungate – bass (2, 3, 5, 6, 8–11)
- Jack Williams – bass (4)
- Eddie Bayers – drums (1–3, 5, 6, 8, 10, 11)
- Paul Leim – drums (4)
- Larrie Londin – drums (9)
- Terry McMillan – percussion (5)
- Jim Horn – recorder (3)
- Baillie & the Boys (Kathie Baillie, Michael Bonagura and Alan LeBoeuf) – backing vocals (1, 2, 6, 8)

Production

- Kyle Lehning – producer, engineer
- Joe Bogan – engineer
- Keith Odle – engineer
- Kirt Odle – engineer
- Doug Sax – mastering at The Mastering Lab (Hollywood, California)
- Larry Dixon – photography
- Jerry Joyner – design
- Virginia Team – art direction
- Vanessa Ware – stylist

== Charts ==
=== Weekly charts ===
Chart (1988)	Peak position
Canadian Country Albums (RPM)	18
US Top Country Albums (Billboard)	6

=== Year-end charts ===
Chart (1988)	Position
US Top Country Albums (Billboard)	54
Chart (1989)	Position
US Top Country Albums (Billboard)	23

=== Singles ===
Year	Single	Peak positions	
Year	Single	US Country	CAN Country
1988	"Addicted"	1	1
1988	"Big Wheels in the Moonlight"	1	*
1989	"They Rage On"	5	4
