= 1986 Country Music Association Awards =

Annual US music awards ceremony

- Date: October 13, 1986
- Location: Grand Ole Opry House, Nashville, Tennessee
- Hosted by: Willie Nelson; Kris Kristofferson
- Most wins: Reba McEntire; Dan Seals (2 each)
- Most nominations: Reba McEntire; The Judds (5 each)

Television/radio coverage
- Network: CBS

The 1986 Country Music Association Awards, 20th Ceremony, was held on October 13, 1986, at the Grand Ole Opry House, Nashville, Tennessee, and was hosted by CMA Award winners Willie Nelson and Kris Kristofferson.

== Winners and nominees ==
Winner are in Bold.

Entertainer of the Year	Album of the Year
**Reba McEntire**; The Judds; Willie Nelson; Ricky Skaggs; George Strait	**Lost in the Fifties Tonight — Ronnie Milsap**; #7 — George Strait; Rockin' with the Rhythm — The Judds; Storms of Life — Randy Travis; Whoever's in New England — Reba McEntire
Male Vocalist of the Year	Female Vocalist of the Year
**George Strait**; George Jones; Gary Morris; Randy Travis; Hank Williams, Jr.	**Reba McEntire**; Rosanne Cash; Janie Fricke; Emmylou Harris; Anne Murray
Vocal Group of the Year	Vocal Duo of the Year
**The Judds**; Exile; Forester Sisters; Nitty Gritty Dirt Band; Oak Ridge Boys	**Dan Seals and Marie Osmond**; Dolly Parton and Kenny Rogers; Gary Morris and Crystal Gayle; Steve Wariner and Nicolette Larson; Waylon Jennings and Willie Nelson
Single of the Year	Song of the Year
**"Bop" — Dan Seals**; "Grandpa (Tell Me 'Bout The Good Old Days)" — The Judds; "Nobody In His Right Mind Would've Left Her" — George Strait; "On The Other Hand" — Randy Travis; "Whoever's In New England" — Reba McEntire	"**On The Other Hand" — Don Schlitz and Paul Overstreet**; "1982" — Buddy Blackmon and Vip Vipperman; "Bop" — Jennifer Kimball and Paul Davis; "Grandpa (Tell Me 'Bout The Good Old Days)" — Jamie O'Hara; "Lost In The Fifties Tonight" — Mike Reid, Fred Parris, and Troy Seals
Horizon Award	Instrumentalist of the Year
**Randy Travis**; Forester Sisters; Kathy Mattea; Dan Seals; Dwight Yoakam	**Johnny Gimble**; Jerry Douglas; Doyle Grisham; Mark O'Connor
Instrumental Group of the Year	Music Video of the Year
**Oak Ridge Boys Band**; Grand Ole Opry Staff Band; Hee Haw Band; Nashville Now Band; Strangers	**Who's Gonna Fill Their Shoes — George Jones**; 100% Chance of Rain — Gary Morris; Grandpa (Tell Me 'Bout The Good Old Days) — The Judds; Honky Tonk Man — Dwight Yoakam; Whoever's In New England — Reba McEntire

== Hall of Fame ==
Country Music Hall of Fame Inductees
- Wesley Rose
- The Duke of Paducah
