= All Fired Up =

All Fired Up may refer to:

== TV and entertainment ==
- All Fired Up (film), a 1982 French comedy film
- "All Fired Up!", an episode of Hit o Nerae!
- "All Fired Up!", a 1998 episode of Pokémon.

== Music ==
- All Fired Up! (tour), a concert tour by The Saturdays

=== Albums ===
- All Fired Up (Fastway album)
- All Fired Up (Poco album)
- All Fired Up, an album by The Jets
- All Fired Up!, an album by Smokie

=== Songs ===
- "All Fired Up" (The Saturdays song)
- "All Fired Up" (Pat Benatar song)
- "All Fired Up" (Matt Corby song)
- "All Fired Up", a song by Fastway from All Fired Up (Fastway album)
- "All Fired Up", a song by the Brand New Heavies from Get Used to It
- "All Fired Up", a song by Dan Seals from Fired Up
- "All Fired Up", a song by Interpol from Our Love to Admire
- "All Fired Up", a song by Judas Priest from Turbo
- "All Fired Up", a song by Petra from album On Fire!
- "All Fired Up", a song and 1987 single by Rattling Sabres written by Kerryn Tolhurst
- "All Fired Up", a song by Slaughter from Back to Reality

== See also ==
- Fired Up (disambiguation)
