= 21st Music City News Country Awards =

US country music awards ceremony in 1987

- Date: June 9, 1987
- Location: Grand Ole Opry House, Nashville, Tennessee
- Hosted by: Johnny Cash; Marie Osmond; Hank Williams Jr.

Highlights
- Most wins: Randy Travis (4)
- Most nominations: The Statlers (6)

Television/radio coverage
- Network: Syndication

The 21st Music City News Country Awards was held on June 9, 1987, at the Grand Ole Opry House, in Nashville, Tennessee . The ceremony was hosted by Johnny Cash, Marie Osmond, and Hank Williams Jr.

== Winners and nominees ==
Winners are shown in bold.

Entertainer of the Year	Album of the Year
**The Statlers**; Alabama; Reba McEntire; George Strait; Randy Travis	**Storms of Life — Randy Travis**; #7 — George Strait; Four for the Show — The Statlers; Lost in the Fifties Tonight — Ronnie Milsap; Whoever's in New England — Reba McEntire
Female Artist of the Year	Male Artist of the Year
**Reba McEntire**; Janie Fricke; Loretta Lynn; Barbara Mandrell; Kathy Mattea	**Randy Travis**; Lee Greenwood; Gary Morris; John Schneider; George Strait
Vocal Group of the Year	Vocal Duo of the Year
**The Statlers**; Alabama; The Forester Sisters; Oak Ridge Boys; Sawyer Brown	**The Judds**; Loretta Lynn and Conway Twitty; Barbara Mandrell and Lee Greenwood; Marie Osmond and Dan Seals; Anita Pointer and Earl Thomas Conley
Gospel Act of the Year	Comedy Act of the Year
**The Hee Haw Gospel Quartet**; Tennessee Ernie Ford; Amy Grant; Christy Lane; Sandi Patti	**Ray Stevens**; Irlene Mandrell; Minnie Pearl; Shotgun Red; Mike Snider
Single of the Year	Video of the Year
"**On the Other Hand**" — **Randy Travis**; "Bop" — Dan Seals; "Count On Me" — The Statlers; "She and I" — Alabama; "Whoever's in New England" — Reba McEntire	"**Whoever's in New England**" — **Reba McEntire**; "The Chair" — George Strait; "Grandpa (Tell Me 'Bout the Good Old Days)" — The Judds; "She and I" — Alabama; "Sweeter and Sweeter" — The Statlers
Star of Tomorrow	TV Series of the Year
**Randy Travis**; T. Graham Brown; Kathy Mattea; Sawyer Brown; Dwight Yoakam	**Nashville Now**; Austin City Limits; Grand Ole Opry Live; Hee Haw; This Week in Country Music
TV Special of the Year
**The Statlers Christmas Present**; Grand Ole Opry Live; The Mandrell Sisters & Family; Marty Robbins: Super Legend; George Strait: Strait From the Heart of Texas
Living Legend Award
**George Jones**

== See also ==
- CMT Music Awards
