= Fired Up =

Fired Up may refer to:

- Fired Up!, a 2009 comedy film
- Fired Up (TV series), an American sitcom
- Fired Up (video game), a vehicular combat game for the PlayStation Portable
- Fired Up (Dan Seals album)
- Fired Up (Alesha album), or the title song
- Fired Up (Randy Houser album), or the title song
- "Fired Up!" (song), by Funky Green Dogs, 1996
- "Fired Up", a song by Jessica Simpson from A Public Affair
- Fired Up can refer to a song from the Disney film ‘Zombies’.

== See also ==
- All Fired Up (disambiguation)
