= Walking the Wire =

Walking the Wire may refer to:

- Walking the Wire (album), a 1992 album by Dan Seals
- "Walking the Wire" (song), a 2017 song by Imagine Dragons

== See also ==
- Tightrope walking
