= There's No Stopping Your Heart (song) =

Single by Marie Osmond

from the album There's No Stopping Your Heart
- B-side: "Blue Sky Shinin'"
- Released: September 1985
- Genre: Country
- Length: 2:53
- Label: Capitol/Curb
- Songwriters: Michael Bonagura; Craig Karp
- Producer: Paul Worley

Marie Osmond singles chronology
"Meet Me in Montana" (1985)	"There's No Stopping Your Heart" (1985)	"Read My Lips" (1986)

"There's No Stopping Your Heart" is a song written by Michael Bonagura and Craig Karp, and recorded by American country music artist Marie Osmond. The title track was released in September 1985 as the second single from the album There's No Stopping Your Heart. The song was Osmond's fifth career number one across all music genres, and her second number one country single. The song held the number one spot for one week and spent a total of fifteen weeks on the country chart.

As a solo artist, "There's No Stopping Your Heart" was her first No. 1 hit since 1973, when she hit the top with a cover of Anita Bryant's "Paper Roses". Just prior to her solo comeback, Osmond had a No. 1 hit duet with Dan Seals, "Meet Me in Montana".

== Chart performance ==
Chart (1985–1986)	Peak position
US Hot Country Songs (Billboard)	1
Canadian RPM Country Tracks	1
