= Londin (disambiguation) =

Londin may refer to:

- Londin., or Londin, or Lond, the post-nominal designating University of London (UoL)
- Ralph Gallant (1943-1992), known professionally as Larrie Londin, American drummer and session musician
