= Read My Lips (Dottie West song) =

Single by Marie Osmond

from the album There's No Stopping Your Heart
- B-side: "That Old Devil Moon"
- Released: March 29, 1986
- Genre: Country
- Length: 3:46
- Label: Capitol/Curb
- Songwriters: Marc Blatte, Larry Gottlieb
- Producer: Paul Worley

Marie Osmond singles chronology
"There's No Stopping Your Heart" (1985)	"Read My Lips" (1986)	"You're Still New to Me" (1986)

"Read My Lips" is a song written by Marc Blatte and Larry Gottlieb, and first recorded by American country music artist Dottie West on her 1983 album New Horizons.

The song was later recorded by American country music artist Marie Osmond and released in March 1986 as the third and final single from her album There's No Stopping Your Heart. The song reached number 4 on the Billboard Hot Country Singles & Tracks chart.

Chart (1986)	Peak position
US Hot Country Songs (Billboard)	4
Canadian RPM Country Tracks	5
