= Tell Me True =

Single by Juice Newton

from the album Emotion
- B-side: "If I Didn't Love You"
- Released: November 14, 1987
- Genre: Country
- Length: 3:10
- Label: RCA
- Songwriter(s): Paul Kennerley, Brent Maher
- Producer(s): Richard Landis

Juice Newton singles chronology
"First Time Caller" (1987)	"Tell Me True" (1987)	"When Love Comes Around the Bend" (1989)

"Tell Me True" is a song written by Paul Kennerley and Brent Maher, and recorded by American country music artist Juice Newton.

After Newton's pop stardom had waned, her 1985 album Old Flame established her as C&W star yielding five Top Ten hits - two of them number ones - on the C&W chart: in addition Newton had topped the C&W chart in 1986 with "Both to Each Other" a duet with Eddie Rabbitt. The follow-up to the Old Flame album, the 1987 release Emotion, failed to continue Newton's hit streak when its first single "First Time Caller" fell short of the C&W Top 20. Released as the second single from the Emotion album in December 1987, "Tell Me True" returned Newton to the C&W Top Ten with a number 8 peak affording Newton her final appearance in the C&W Top 30. Strangely enough, RCA Records released no additional singles from the album despite the success of "Tell Me True."

With no further singles issued from the Emotion album, "Tell Me True" would be the final Juice Newton commercial single produced by her longtime collaborator Richard Landis until the 1998 single "When I Get Over You." Newton would make a final appearance on the C&W chart in 1989 with "When Love Comes Around the Bend" (number 40), which was issued only as a promotional single.

== Charts ==
=== Weekly charts ===
Chart (1987–1988)	Peak position
US Hot Country Songs (Billboard)	8
Canadian RPM Country Tracks	2

=== Year-end charts ===
Chart (1988)	Position
US Hot Country Songs (Billboard)	95
