= When Love Comes Around the Bend =

Single by Juice Newton

from the album Ain't Gonna Cry
- Released: May 6, 1989
- Genre: Country
- Length: 2:29
- Label: RCA
- Songwriters: Pam Tillis, Josh Leo, Mark Wright
- Producer: Josh Leo

Juice Newton singles chronology
| "Tell Me True" (1987) | "When Love Comes Around the Bend" (1989) | "When I Get Over You" (1998) |

"When Love Comes Around the Bend"

Single by Dan Seals

from the album Walking the Wire
- B-side: "Sweet Little Shoe"
- Released: July 1992
- Genre: Country
- Length: 2:40
- Label: RCA
- Songwriters: Pam Tillis, Josh Leo, Mark Wright
- Producer: Kyle Lehning

Dan Seals singles chronology
| "Mason Dixon Line" (1992) | "When Love Comes Around the Bend" (1992) | "Fired Up" (1994) |

"When Love Comes Around the Bend" is a song recorded by American country music artist Juice Newton. It was released in May 1989 as a promotional single from the album Ain't Gonna Cry. The song reached #40 on the Billboard Hot Country Single & Tracks chart. The song was written by Pam Tillis, Josh Leo and Mark Wright.

Dan Seals also recorded it on his 1992 album Walking the Wire. His version was a single as well, peaking at number 51 on the same chart.

== Chart performance ==
=== Juice Newton ===
| Chart (1989) | Peak position |
|---|---|
| US Hot Country Songs (Billboard) | 40 |

=== Dan Seals ===
| Chart (1992) | Peak position |
|---|---|
| US Hot Country Songs (Billboard) | 51 |
