= Bobby Thompson (musician) =

American banjoist and guitarist (1937–2005)

Bobby Thompson (born Robert Clark Thompson; July 5, 1937 – May 18, 2005) was an American banjoist and guitarist. He worked as a session musician from the 1960s through 1980s. He recorded with Dolly Parton, Johnny Cash, Loretta Lynn, Neil Young, Perry Como, among others.

Thompson was born in Converse, South Carolina. In the late 1960s, he joined his fellow session musicians, Weldon Myrick, Charlie McCoy to form Area Code 615.

He died in 2005 at the age of 67.

== Selected discography ==
With The Monkees

- The Monkees Present (1969)
- Missing Links Volume Two (1990)

With Charley Pride

- Christmas in My Home Town (1970)
- Charley (1975)
- The Happiness of Having You (1975)

With Dottie West

- Country and West (1970)
- Forever Yours (1970)
- If It's All Right With You/Just What I've Been Looking For (1972)
- Country Sunshine (1973)
- Carolina Cousins (1975)

With Willie Nelson

- Yesterday's Wine (1971)

With The Everly Brothers

- Pass the Chicken & Listen (1972)

With Donna Fargo

- My Second Album (1972)
- All About a Feeling (1973)

With Porter Wagoner and Dolly Parton

- Together Always (1972)

With Johnny Cash

- Any Old Wind That Blows (1973)
- Look at Them Beans (1975)
- One Piece at a Time (1976)
- Rockabilly Blues (1980)

With Hank Wilson

- Hank Wilson's Back Vol. I (1973)

With Tom Rapp / Pearls Before Swine

- Sunforest (1973)

With Ferlin Husky

- Champagne Ladies and Blue Ribbon Babies (1974)

With Waylon Jennings

- The Ramblin' Man (1974)

With The Pointer Sisters

- That's a Plenty (1974)

With The Statler Brothers

- Sons of the Motherland (1974)

With Ronnie Milsap

- A Legend in My Time (1975)

With Jimmy Buffett

- High Cumberland Jubilee (1976)

With Eddie Rabbitt

- Rocky Mountain Music (1976)
- Rabbitt (1977)
- Variations (1978)

With England Dan & John Ford Coley

- Nights Are Forever (1976)
- Dowdy Ferry Road (1977)
- Some Things Don't Come Easy (1978)

With Barbara Mandrell

- Lovers, Friends and Strangers (1977)

With Dolly Parton

- Jolene (1974)
- New Harvest...First Gathering (1977)

With Mickey Newbury

- Frisco Mabel Joy (1971)
- Heaven Help the Child (1973)
- Rusty Tracks (1977)
- The Sailor (1979)

With The Oak Ridge Boys

- Y'all Come Back Saloon (1977)
- Room Service (1978)
- The Oak Ridge Boys Have Arrived (1979)
- Together (1980)

With Margo Smith

- A Woman (1979)

Soundtrack

- Malibu Express (1980)

With Jerry Lee Lewis

- When Two Worlds Collide (1980)
- Killer Country (1980)

With Dan Seals

- Stones (1980)
- Harbinger (1982)
- Rebel Heart (1983)
- San Antone (1984)
- Won't Be Blue Anymore (1985)
- On the Front Line (1986)

With Hank Williams Jr.

- Habits Old and New (1980)
- Rowdy (1981)
- The Pressure Is On (1981)
- High Notes (1982)

With John Anderson

- I Just Came Home to Count the Memories (1981)

With Loretta Lynn

- I Lie (1982)

With George Strait

- Strait Country (1981)
- Strait from the Heart (1982)

With Reba McEntire

- Unlimited (1982)
- Behind the Scene (1983)
- My Kind of Country (1984)

With Chet Atkins

- Great Hits of the Past (1983)

With Neil Young

- Old Ways (1985)
