= Tulsa Ballroom =

Single by Dottie West

from the album New Horizons
- B-side: "The Woman in Love with You"
- Released: May 1983
- Recorded: March 1983
- Studio: Britannia Studios
- Genre: Country; country pop
- Length: 3:16
- Label: Liberty
- Songwriters: Dewayne Blackwell; John Murrill
- Producers: Steve Dorff; Snuff Garrett

Dottie West singles chronology
"If It Takes All Night" (1982)	"Tulsa Ballroom" (1983)	"Night Love Let You Down" (1983)

"Tulsa Ballroom" is a song written by Dewayne Blackwell and John Murrill, and recorded by American country music artist Dottie West. It was released in May 1983 as the first single from the album New Horizons. The song reached #40 of the US Hot Country Songs. It was the last top 40 hit of Dottie West’s career.

== Background and recording ==
Dottie West first found success during the 1960s but had a comeback once recording duets with Kenny Rogers in the 1970s. Her solo career was also given a refresh and she had first solo number one singles during this time. One of her solo singles of this period was 1983's "Tulsa Ballroom", which was written by Dewayne Blackwell and John Murrill. The song's story line is set in Tulsa, Oklahoma and reminisces a love affair that began at a dance hall there. "Tulsa Ballroom" was recorded in Hollywood, California at Britannia Studios in March 1983. It was produced by Steve Dorff and Snuff Garrett.

== Release, chart performance and critical reception ==
"Tulsa Ballroom" was issued as a single by Liberty Records in May 1983. It was backed on the B-side by the track "The Woman in Love with You". The disc was distributed as a seven-inch vinyl record. It the lead single from West's 1983 studio album New Horizons. Although no formal review was given, Cashbox named the song one of its "Feature Picks" in May 1983. "Tulsa Ballroom" debuted on the US Billboard Hot Country Songs chart on June 18, 1983. It spent a total of 11 weeks there, reaching the number 40 position on July 30. "Tulsa Ballroom" was West's final solo single to make the Billboard country top 40.

== Track listing ==
7 inch vinyl single

- "Tulsa Ballroom" – 3:16
- "The Woman in Love with You" – 2:40

== Chart performance ==
Weekly chart performance for "Tulsa Ballroom"
Chart (1983)	Peak position
US Hot Country Songs (Billboard)	40
