= One Friend =

Single by Dan Seals

from the album The Best
- B-side: "Bop"
- Released: September 1987
- Genre: Country
- Length: 3:13
- Label: Capitol
- Songwriter(s): Dan Seals
- Producer(s): Kyle Lehning

Dan Seals singles chronology
"Three Time Loser" (1987)	"One Friend" (1987)	"Addicted" (1988)

"One Friend" is a song written and recorded by American country music artist Dan Seals for his 1984 album San Antone, and this version was the B-side to that album's single "(You Bring Out) The Wild Side of Me". In 1987, Seals re-recorded the song and, in September 1987, released it as the first and only single from his compilation album The Best. It peaked at number one on the country charts, becoming his seventh straight number-one single.

== Music video ==
Seals re-recorded "One Friend" again for his 1995 acoustic album, In a Quiet Room, and a music video was filmed for that version the following year. It was directed by Tom Bevins, and it shows Seals singing and performing the song on his guitar while sitting by a bonfire. It was the last music video of Seals' career.

== Charts ==
=== Weekly charts ===
Chart (1987–1988)	Peak position
US Hot Country Songs (Billboard)	1
Canadian RPM Country Tracks	1

=== Year-end charts ===
Chart (1988)	Position
Canadian RPM Country Tracks	46
US Hot Country Songs (Billboard)	99
