= New Horizons (Dottie West album) =

Studio album by Dottie West
- Released: July 1983
- Recorded: March 1983
- Studio: Britannia (Hollywood Hills)
- Genre: Country pop
- Label: Liberty
- Producers: Snuff Garrett, Steve Dorff

Dottie West chronology
Full Circle (1982)	New Horizons (1983)	The Best of Dottie West (1984)

New Horizons is a studio album by American country music artist Dottie West, released in 1983.

This was another unsuccessful album for Dottie West. Her chart success continued to spiral downward, as the result of poor record sales from her previous album, as well as this album. This was the last album released by West under Liberty Records (which had its name changed from United Artists in 1980). A single from the album, "Tulsa Ballroom" became West's last Top 40 Country hit in her solo career. The other single from the album, "The Night Love Let You Down", didn't chart, her first single not to do so since her career on major labels began in 1963. The album did chart on the "Top Country Albums" chart (this would be West's last chart appearance on the "Top Country Albums" chart), but went no farther than No. 65. West was 50 at the time and although a highly popular concert artist her mainstream success on records was fading out like several of her other contemporaries, being overtaken by a new generation of stars. Two songs from this album eventually appeared on albums by other artists. Barbara Mandrell and Steve Wariner recorded "Overnight Sensation", which appeared on Mandrell's album Spun Gold in 1983. It is notable that Steve Wariner was an artist that was helped greatly by Dottie in the beginning of his career, touring as part of her backing band much like Larry Gatlin. The other song "Read My Lips" was a Top 5 single for Marie Osmond in 1986. It appears on her There's No Stopping Your Heart album.

== Track listing ==
No.	Title	Writer(s)	Length
1.	"Overnight Sensation"	Jerry Fuller	2:27
2.	"Tulsa Ballroom"	John Durrill, Dewayne Blackwell	3:16
3.	"The Night Love Let You Down"	Johnny Cunningham, Steve Stone	3:05
4.	"Woman in Love with You"	Steve Dorff, Gary Harju	2:40
5.	"I Make a Great Cup of Coffee"	Jeff Harrington, Jeff Pennig	2:24
6.	"Who's That Look in Your Eyes"	Robert Byrne, Tom Brasfield	3:18
7.	"He's All I Need"	Dottie West, Jeannie Seely	2:32
8.	"If I Ever Cross Your Mind"	Gloria Sklerov, Mack David	3:05
9.	"Hate the Lies, Love the Liar"	Dorff, David	3:42
10.	"Read My Lips"	Marc Blatte, Larry Gottlieb	3:22

== Chart performance ==
=== Album ===
Chart performance for New Horizons
Chart (1983)	Peak position
US Top Country Albums (Billboard)	65

=== Singles ===
Year	Single	Peak positions
Year	Single	US Country
1983	"Tulsa Ballroom"	40
1983	"The Night Love Let You Down"	—
