= San Antone (album) =

Studio album by Dan Seals
- Released: 1984
- Studio: Recorded at Emerald Sound Studios (Nashville, Tennessee); Tracked, mixed and overdubbed at Morningstar Studios (Hendersonville, Tennessee)
- Genre: Country
- Length: 36:44
- Label: EMI America
- Producer: Kyle Lehning

Dan Seals chronology
Rebel Heart (1983)	San Antone (1984)	Won't Be Blue Anymore (1985)

Singles from San Antone
- 1. "(You Bring Out) The Wild Side of Me" Released: June 1984; 2. "My Baby's Got Good Timing" Released: October 1984; 3. "My Old Yellow Car" Released: February 1985

Professional ratings
Review scores
Source	Rating
AllMusic	link

San Antone is the fourth studio album by American country music artist Dan Seals. The album charted at No. 24 on the Top Country Albums chart. The singles, "(You Bring Out) The Wild Side of Me", "My Baby's Got Good Timing", and "My Old Yellow Car" charted at Nos. 9, 2, and 9, respectively. This is his second album for Liberty Records. "One Friend" was later re-recorded for his 1987 album The Best, from which it was released as a single. "Who's Gonna Keep Me Warm" was first released in 1983 by Phil Everly.

== Track listing ==
No.	Title	Writer(s)	Length
1.	"In San Antone"	Dan Seals	5:04
2.	"The Loving Proof"	Gary Nicholson	3:40
3.	"Tonight Is for the Lover in You"	Bob McDill, Charlie Black	3:06
4.	"My Baby's Got Good Timing"	McDill, Seals	3:27
5.	"Who's Gonna Keep Me Warm"	Kevin McKnelly, Don Stirling	3:04
6.	"(You Bring Out) The Wild Side of Me"	Seals	3:21
7.	"My Old Yellow Car"	Thom Schuyler	3:36
8.	"She Thinks I Still Care"	Dickey Lee, Steve Duffy	2:54
9.	"She's Leaving"	Seals, McDill	3:32
10.	"Oh These Nights"	Seals, Rafe Van Hoy	3:03
11.	"One Friend"	Seals	1:57

== Personnel ==
- Dan Seals – lead vocals, backing vocals, acoustic guitar (4)
- David Briggs – electric piano (1, 3, 5), acoustic piano (2, 6)
- Kyle Lehning – synthesizers (1, 5, 7)
- Shane Keister – vocoder (2, 9, 11), acoustic piano (4, 6–8, 10), organ (4), electric piano (7, 10), Yamaha DX7 (9)
- Steve Gibson – electric guitar (1–10), electric rhythm guitar (1, 4), gut-string guitar (1), electric guitar solo (3), acoustic guitar (5, 7–9)
- Joe Stanley – electric guitar solo (1)
- David Thompson – acoustic guitar (1)
- Bobby Thompson – acoustic guitar (2, 3, 5, 6)
- Larry Byrom – electric lead guitar (4)
- Thom Schuyler – acoustic guitar (7, 8)
- Rafe Van Hoy – acoustic guitar (11)
- Doyle Grisham – steel guitar (1, 3, 5, 6, 8, 10)
- David Hungate – bass (1–6, 9)
- Norbert Putnam – bass (7, 8, 10)
- Larrie Londin – drums (1–10)
- Farrell Morris – percussion (5)
- Hoot Hester – fiddle (6–8, 10)
- Bergen White – string arrangements (3, 5, 9, 11)
- The Nashville String Machine – strings (3, 5, 9, 11)
- Wendy Waldman – backing vocals (5)

Production

- Kyle Lehning – producer, engineer
- Joseph Bogan – engineer
- Russ Martin – assistant engineer
- Keith Odle – assistant engineer
- Kirt Odle – assistant engineer
- Doug Sax – mastering at The Mastering Lab (Hollywood, California)
- Henry Marquez – art direction
- Peter Shea – design
- Mark Tucker – photography

== Chart performance ==
=== Weekly charts ===
Chart (1984–85)	Peak position
US Top Country Albums (Billboard)	24

=== Year-end charts ===
Chart (1985)	Position
US Top Country Albums (Billboard)	43

=== Singles ===
Year	Single	Peak positions	
Year	Single	US Country	CAN Country
1984	"(You Bring Out) The Wild Side of Me"	9	6
1984	"My Baby's Got Good Timing"	2	2
1985	"My Old Yellow Car"	9	9
