= Good Times (Sam Cooke song) =

1964 song written and recorded by Sam Cooke

Single by Sam Cooke
- B-side: "Tennessee Waltz"
- Released: July 9, 1964
- Recorded: December 20 and 21, 1963 and February 2, 1964
- Studio: RCA Studio CA
- Label: RCA 8368
- Songwriter: Sam Cooke
- Producers: Hugo Peretti and Luigi Creatore

Sam Cooke singles chronology
"(Ain't That) Good News" (1964)	"Good Times" (1964)	"That's Where It's At" (1964)

"Good Times" is a song written and recorded by Sam Cooke, released as single in 1964.

== Critical reception ==
In a retrospective review in 1971, music critic Dave Marsh wrote that "at his very best, Cooke utilized a perfect lyrical sentimentality... listen to 'Good Times' – It might be one o'clock and it might be three/Time don't mean that much to me/Ain't felt this good since I don't know when/And I might not feel this good again/So come on baby, let the good times roll/We gonna stay here til we soothe our soul. That summed up perfectly what rock and roll was about, and still is, in so many ways."

== Personnel ==
Featured musicians are John Ewing (trombone), Edward Hall (drums and percussion), John Pisano (guitar), Clifton White (guitar) and Johnnie Taylor (back-up vocals).

== Chart positions ==
=== Sam Cooke ===
The Sam Cooke version of the song hit number one on the Cash Box R&B chart and number eleven on the Billboard Hot 100.

Chart (1964)	Peak position
US Billboard Hot 100	11

== Dan Seals version ==
"Good Times"

Single by Dan Seals

from the album On Arrival
- B-side: "Bop"
- Released: March 25, 1990
- Genre: Country
- Length: 3:51
- Label: Capitol
- Songwriter: Sam Cooke
- Producer: Kyle Lehning

Dan Seals singles chronology
"Love on Arrival" (1990)	"Good Times" (1990)	"Bordertown" (1990)

Dan Seals' version was a Number One hit on Billboard's Hot Country Singles & Tracks chart in mid-1990, and is the second single from his 1990 album On Arrival. His version stayed at number 1 for two weeks, and was his last number 1 hit, as well as his last top 40 hit of his career.

=== Chart performance ===
Chart (1990)	Peak position
Canada Country Singles (RPM)	1
US Hot Country Songs (Billboard)	1

=== Year-end charts ===
Chart (1990)	Position
Canada Country Tracks (RPM)	32
US Country Songs (Billboard)	25

== Other cover versions ==
Aretha Franklin covered the song for her 1967 album I Never Loved a Man the Way I Love You. It was described by Rolling Stone as the album's "party starter" and by AllMusic as "on par with the original recording". The Grateful Dead would sometimes open their live shows with the song as well.
