= Harbinger (Dan Seals album) =

Studio album by Dan Seals
- Released: 1982
- Studio: Studio By The Pond, Morningstar Sound Studio and Doc's Place (Hendersonville, Tennessee); The Bennett House (Franklin, Tennessee).
- Genre: Soft rock; pop rock
- Length: 43:57
- Label: Atlantic
- Producer: Kyle Lehning

Dan Seals chronology
Stones (1980)	Harbinger (1982)	Rebel Heart (1983)

Professional ratings
Review scores
Source	Rating
Allmusic	link

Harbinger is the second solo album by American singer-songwriter Dan Seals. Two tracks "Can't Get You Out of My Mind", and "I Could Be Lovin' You Right Now" were both released as singles, but both failed to chart. This is his last album for Atlantic, before switching to Liberty/Capitol in 1983. This album was finally released on CD on October 17, 2006.

== Track listing ==
1. "Can't Get You Out of My Mind" (Steve Wilson, Kelly Wilson) - 4:28
2. "I Could Be Lovin' You Right Now" (Pam Tillis, Jarrett Washington II) - 4:00
3. "It's Not Gonna Be That Easy" (Deborah Allen, Eddie Struzick, Rafe Van Hoy) - 3:23
4. "In My Heart" (Rick Bowles, Richard Putnam) - 3:29
5. "It Will Be Alright" (David Foster, Jay Graydon, Allee Willis) - 3:51
6. "I Don't Believe I'll Fall in Love Again" (Dan Seals, Van Hoy) - 3:56
7. "Once in a While" (Alan Tarney) - 4:12
8. "Up to Me" (Glen Ballard, Mark Mueller) - 3:30
9. "Not Every Heart Succeeds" (Newton, Noble, Pippin, Spriggs) - 3:36
10. "Bad News" (Seals, Van Hoy) - 5:07
11. "Harbinger, Sage or Fool" (Seals) - 4:25

== Personnel ==
- Dan Seals – lead vocals, backing vocals
- Shane Keister – keyboards
- Randy McCormick – keyboards
- Bobby Ogdin – keyboards
- Kelly Wilson – keyboards
- Larry Byrom – guitars
- Duncan Cameron – guitars
- Steve Gibson – guitars
- Jon Goin – guitars
- Dann Huff – guitars
- Bobby Thompson – guitars
- Rafe Van Hoy – guitars
- Steve Wilson – guitars
- David Hungate – bass
- Tom Robb – bass
- Jack Williams – bass, string arrangements
- Bob Wray – bass
- Larrie Londin – drums
- James Stroud – drums
- Farrell Morris – percussion
- Mike Lewis – string arrangements
- The Shelly Kurland Strings – strings
- Sherri Huffman – backing vocals
- Lisa Silver – backing vocals
- Diane Tidwell – backing vocals

=== Production ===
- Kyle Lehning – producer, engineer, mixing
- Don Cobb – engineer, mixing
- Joseph Bogan – mixing
- Bobby Bradley – second engineer
- Carl Frost – second engineer
- Kirt Odle – second engineer
- John Putnam – mix assistant
- Glenn Meadows – mastering at Masterfonics (Nashville, Tennessee)
- Bob Defrin – art direction
- Jim "Señor" McGuire – photography
- Susan Joseph – management
