= Addicted (Cheryl Wheeler song) =

Single by Dan Seals

from the album Rage On
- B-side: "Maybe I'm Missing You Now"
- Released: May 1988
- Genre: Country
- Length: 4:15
- Label: Capitol
- Songwriter: Cheryl Wheeler
- Producer: Kyle Lehning

Dan Seals singles chronology
"One Friend" (1987)	"Addicted" (1988)	"Big Wheels in the Moonlight" (1988)

"Addicted" is a song written by Cheryl Wheeler, first recorded in 1985 and released on her self-titled debut album. It was later recorded by American country music artist Dan Seals and released as the lead single from his 1988 album Rage On. It peaked at number one on the Billboard Country chart, and was his eighth consecutive number-one single. Blake Shelton covered the song as a bonus track on his 2011 album Red River Blue.

== Charts ==
=== Weekly charts ===
Chart (1988)	Peak position
US Hot Country Songs (Billboard)	1
Canadian RPM Country Tracks	1

=== Year-end charts ===
Chart (1988)	Position
Canadian RPM Country Tracks	4
US Hot Country Songs (Billboard)	11
