= Walking the Wire (album) =

Studio album by Dan Seals
- Released: May 12, 1992
- Studios: Morningstar Sound Studio (Hendersonville, Tennessee); GroundStar Laboratories and Nightingale Studios (Nashville, Tennessee)
- Genre: Country
- Length: 35:30
- Label: Warner Bros.
- Producer: Kyle Lehning

Dan Seals chronology
Greatest Hits (1991)	Walking the Wire (1992)	Fired Up (1994)

Professional ratings
Review scores
Source	Rating
Allmusic	2.5/5 stars

Walking the Wire is an album released by American country music singer Dan Seals. It was his first for the Warner Brothers label (ironically, the same label his older brother, Jim Seals, was once signed with as one half of Seals & Crofts). Three of its four singles charted, which were "Sweet Little Shoe" (peaked at number 62), "Mason Dixon Line" (peaked at number 43), and "When Love Comes Around the Bend" (peaked at number 51). The B-side to "Mason Dixon Line", titled "Be My Angel", was later a non-album single for Lionel Cartwright, peaking at number 63 in late 1992.

== Track listing ==
1. "Mason Dixon Line" (Dan Seals) - 3:10
2. "When Love Comes Around the Bend" (Josh Leo, Pam Tillis, Mark Wright) - 2:40
3. "Someone Else's Dance" (Parker McGee) - 3:58
4. "Sneaky Moon" (Bill LaBounty) - 3:20
5. "A Good Rain" (Charlie Black, Jenny Yates) - 4:06
6. "Sweet Little Shoe" (Jesse Winchester) - 3:29
7. "Slower" (Tony Arata) - 3:19
8. "Maybe That's Why" (Allen Shamblin) - 3:06
9. "The Wire" (Seals) - 3:28
10. "We Are One" (Seals) - 4:54

== Personnel ==
- Dan Seals – lead vocals, harmony vocals
- Mike Lawler – keyboards (1, 6), synthesizers (3), synth horns (6), drums (6), percussion (6), keyboard programming (10), drum programming (10)
- Dennis Burnside – electric piano (2)
- Kyle Lehning – synthesizers (2), electric guitar (8)
- Hargus "Pig" Robbins – acoustic piano (3), Hammond B3 organ (4), Yamaha DX7 (7)
- Matt Rollings – Rhodes electric piano (5), synthesizers (5)
- Barry Beckett – acoustic piano (10)
- Mark Casstevens – acoustic guitar (1–5, 7–9)
- Chris Leuzinger – acoustic guitar (1–5, 7, 9), guitar solo (1), electric guitar (2, 3), acoustic slide guitar (4), electric tremolo guitar (4), electric slide guitar (8), all electric guitars (10)
- Steve Gibson – electric guitar (1–3), 12-string guitar (2), electric guitar solo (2), 6-string bass (2), mandolin (8)
- Larry Byrom – electric 12-string guitar (3), electric guitar (4, 6, 7, 9), acoustic guitar (6, 8)
- Billy Joe Walker Jr. – electric 12-string guitar (3), electric guitar (4), electric lead guitar (6), electric rhythm guitar (6), acoustic slide guitar (8), acoustic 8-string guitar (10)
- John Willis – all electric guitars (5), electric guitar (7, 9)
- Sonny Garrish – steel guitar (1–3, 5, 7, 8)
- Weldon Myrick – steel guitar (9)
- David Hungate – electric bass (1, 2, 5, 8, 10)
- Glenn Worf – electric bass (3, 4, 7, 9)
- Edgar Meyer – acoustic bass (3, 9)
- Eddie Bayers – drums (1, 2, 5, 8)
- Larrie Londin – drums (3, 4, 7, 9)
- Paul Leim – drums (10)
- Mark O'Connor – fiddle (5, 8)
- Terry McMillan – harmonica (4, 6, 8, 9), percussion (7–9)
- Jim Horn – baritone saxophone (6)
- John Wesley Ryles – harmony vocals (2)
- Curtis Young – harmony vocals (2, 3, 7, 10)
- Cindy Richardson Walker – harmony vocals (3, 6, 7, 10), whisper (5)
- Dennis Wilson – harmony vocals (3, 6, 7)
- Carol Chase – harmony vocals (6)

=== Production ===
- Martha Sharp – A&R direction
- Kyle Lehning – producer
- John Condon – production coordinator
- Virginia Team – art direction
- Jerry Joyner – design
- Beverly Parker – photography
- Maria Smoot – make-up
- Sherri McCoy – stylist
- Tony Gottlieb – management

Technical credits

- Doug Sax – mastering
- Alan Yoshida – mastering
- The Mastering Lab (Hollywood, California) – mastering location
- Joseph Bogan – recording
- John Condon – recording
- Kyle Lehning – recording, mixing (1–5, 7–10)
- Kirt Odle – recording
- Bill Schnee – mixing (6)
- John Kunz – recording assistant
- Keith Odle – recording assistant
- Steve Tviet – recording assistant

== Singles ==
Year	Single	US Country	CAN Country
1991	"Sweet Little Shoe"	62	87
1992	"Mason Dixon Line"	43	66
1992	"When Love Comes Around the Bend"	51	93
1992	"We Are One"	-	-
