= Rebel Heart (Dan Seals album) =

Studio album by Dan Seals
- Released: 1983
- Studio: Tracks recorded at Emerald Sound (Nashville, Tennessee); Overdubbed and mixed at Morningstar Sound (Hendersonville, Tennessee)
- Genre: Country, urban cowboy
- Length: 34:11
- Label: Liberty
- Producer: Kyle Lehning

Dan Seals chronology
| Harbinger (1982) | Rebel Heart (1983) | San Antone (1984) |

Singles from Rebel Heart
- 1. "Everybody's Dream Girl" Released: 1983; 2. "After You" Released: 1983; 3. "You Really Go for the Heart" Released: 1983; 4. "God Must Be a Cowboy" Released: 1984

Professional ratings
Review scores
| Source | Rating |
|---|---|
| AllMusic | 3/5 stars |

Rebel Heart is the third studio album by American country music artist Dan Seals, released in 1983 through Liberty Records. The album marks the departure from his established soft rock sound and became a more country sound. It was also his first album to appear on the charts, reaching No. 40 on the Top Country Albums chart. He achieved his first top ten single with the song "God Must Be a Cowboy". The other singles released from the album were "Everybody's Dream Girl" (No. 18), "After You" (No. 28), and "You Really Go for the Heart" (No. 37).

== Track listing ==
| No. | Title | Writer(s) | Length |
|---|---|---|---|
| 1. | "You Really Go for the Heart" | Charlie Black, Jerry Gillespie, Tommy Rocco | 2:54 |
| 2. | "After You" | Paul Battle, Bucky Jones, Chris Waters | 3:33 |
| 3. | "Everybody's Dream Girl" | Van Stephenson, Dave Robbins, Dan Seals | 2:56 |
| 4. | "Down the Hall" | Troy Seals, Mike Reid | 3:32 |
| 5. | "Up on a Hill" | D. Seals | 4:30 |
| 6. | "Candle in the Rain" | D. Seals | 2:56 |
| 7. | "God Must Be a Cowboy" | D. Seals | 3:05 |
| 8. | "On a Night Like This" | D. Seals | 2:59 |
| 9. | "The Banker" | D. Seals | 4:41 |
| 10. | "Nothin' Left to Do but Cry" | Dave Loggins, D. Seals | 3:05 |

== Personnel ==
- Dan Seals – lead vocals, acoustic guitar, backing vocals (1–4, 6–10)
- Shane Keister – keyboards, synthesizers
- Bobby Ogdin – keyboards
- Steve Gibson – electric guitar
- Dann Huff – electric guitar
- John Porter McMeans – electric guitar
- Fred Newell – electric guitar
- Bobby Thompson – acoustic guitar
- Rafe Van Hoy – acoustic guitar, electric guitar
- Reggie Young – electric guitar
- Doyle Grisham – steel guitar
- David Hungate – bass
- Jack Williams – bass
- Larrie Londin – drums
- James Stroud – drums
- Buddy Spicher – fiddle
- Sherri Huffman – backing vocals (5)
- Lisa Silver – backing vocals (5)
- Diane Tidwell – backing vocals (5)

Production

- Kyle Lehning – producer, overdubbing, mixing
- Joseph Bogan – track recording
- Russ Martin – tracking assistant
- Keith Odle – tracking assistant
- Kirt Odle – overdub assistant, mix assistant
- John Eberle – mastering at Nashville Record Productions (Nashville, Tennessee)
- Henry Marquez – art direction
- Amy Nagasawa – design
- Jennifer Griffiths – photography

== Chart performance ==
=== Album ===
| Chart (1983) | Peak position |
|---|---|
| U.S. Billboard Top Country Albums | 40 |

=== Singles ===
| Year | Single | Peak positions | |
| Year | Single | US Country | CAN Country |
|---|---|---|---|
| 1983 | "Everybody's Dream Girl" | 18 | — |
| 1983 | "After You" | 28 | 30 |
| 1983 | "You Really Go for the Heart" | 37 | 23 |
| 1984 | "God Must Be a Cowboy" | 10 | 8 |
