= Meet Me in Montana =

Single by Dan Seals and Marie Osmond

from the album Won't Be Blue Anymore (Seals) and There's No Stopping Your Heart (Osmond)
- B-side: "What Do Lonely People Do"
- Released: July 1985
- Genre: Country
- Length: 3:54
- Label: Capitol/Curb
- Songwriter(s): Paul Davis
- Producer(s): Kyle Lehning; Paul Worley

Dan Seals singles chronology
"My Old Yellow Car" (1985)	"Meet Me in Montana" (1985)	"Bop" (1985)

Marie Osmond singles chronology
"Until I Fall in Love Again" (1985)	"Meet Me in Montana" (1985)	"There's No Stopping Your Heart" (1985)

"Meet Me in Montana" is a song recorded by American country music artists Dan Seals and Marie Osmond. It was released in July 1985 as the lead-off single from Seals' album Won't Be Blue Anymore, and the second single from Osmond's 1985 album There's No Stopping Your Heart. The song was written by Paul Davis, who would later have a duet success of his own with Osmond, "You're Still New to Me."

"Meet Me in Montana" reached No. 1 on the Billboard magazine Hot Country Singles chart for one week in October 1985. The single was the first chart-topping hit for Seals, and Osmond's second No. 1 hit, her first to peak at the top of the chart since 1973's "Paper Roses".

When performed live in concert since Seals's death in 2009, Osmond's brother Merrill Osmond usually serves as the duet partner.

== Content ==
The song refers to two lovers who go their separate ways to pursue dreams; him, to be a country music star, and her to be a Hollywood actress. When both of them experience misery and failure, they decide that the best hope for their future is with each other, in Montana.

== Chart history ==
Chart (1985)	Peak position
US Hot Country Songs (Billboard)	1
Canadian RPM Country Tracks	19
