= They Rage On =

Single by Dan Seals

from the album Rage On
- B-side: "Factory Town"
- Released: February 1989
- Genre: Country
- Length: 4:40
- Label: Capitol
- Songwriters: Bob McDill; Dan Seals
- Producer: Kyle Lehning

Dan Seals singles chronology
"Big Wheels in the Moonlight" (1988)	"They Rage On" (1989)	"Love on Arrival" (1990)

"They Rage On" is a song co-written and recorded by American country music singer Dan Seals. It was released in February 1989 as the third and final single from his album Rage On. It peaked at #5 on the Billboard country charts in June 1989, thus breaking his streak of number-one hits. It was his first single to miss the #1 spot since his early-1985 single "My Old Yellow Car", which peaked at #9. The song was written by Seals and Bob McDill.

== Music video ==
The music video was directed by Neil Abramson. This video, in particular, played on the song's theme of the irony of small-town values with the depiction of an inter-racial relationship. In it, a white teen-aged boy falls in love with an Asian girl, angering the boy's friends to the point they vandalize the boy's car; one boy attempts to assault the girl's father by hurling a beer bottle at him (the bottle misses).

== Chart positions ==
Chart (1989)	Peak position
Canada Country Singles (RPM)	4
US Hot Country Songs (Billboard)	5

=== Year-end charts ===
Chart (1989)	Position
Canada Country Tracks (RPM)	38
US Country Songs (Billboard)	56
