= Stones (Dan Seals album) =

Studio album by Dan Seals
- Released: June 1980
- Studio: Larrabee Sound Studios, Producers Workshop and John Thomas Studio (Hollywood, California); Redwing Studios (Tarzana, California); Woodland Sound Studios and Creative Workshop (Nashville, Tennessee); Studio By The Pond (Hendersonville, Tennessee)
- Genre: Rock; pop rock; soft rock
- Length: 37:20
- Label: Atlantic
- Producer: Kyle Lehning

Dan Seals chronology
Stones (1980)	Harbinger (1982)

Professional ratings
Review scores
Source	Rating
Allmusic	link

Stones is the debut solo studio album by American singer-songwriter Dan Seals. It was released by Atlantic Records in June 1980. The album was Seals' first solo album after he parted ways from the duo England Dan & John Ford Coley to pursue a career in country music, but unlike his later recordings, this is a pop rock and soft rock album which focuses mainly on the artist's instrumental talents. It is his only album using the 'England Dan' moniker.

Stones was preceded by the release of the singles: "Late at Night", "Stones (Dig a Little Deeper)", and "Love Me Like the Last Time". The singles were failed to chart, although the 1st one was a minor pop hit, peaking at #57 on the Hot 100. The album was later released on CD in 2006 on the Wounded Bird label.

== Track listing ==
1. "Stones (Dig a Little Deeper)" (Dave Loggins) - 4:40
2. "Late at Night" (Dan Seals, Rafe Van Hoy) - 3:28
3. "Love Me Like the Last Time" (Seals, Van Hoy) - 3:52
4. "Getting to the Point" (Peppi Castro) - 3:52
5. "How Do I Survive" (Paul Bliss) - 3:50
6. "Holdin' Out for Love" (Tom Snow, Cynthia Weil) - 3:40
7. "You Could've Been the One" (John Batdorf, Sue Sheridan) - 3:07
8. "Take You Home" (Seals, Van Hoy) - 4:31
9. "When It's Over" (John Ford Coley, Bob Gundry, Seals) - 2:49
10. "Lullaby" (Seals, Van Hoy) - 3:31

== Personnel ==
- Dan Seals – lead vocals, backing vocals (1–3, 5, 7, 8, 10), arrangements (3), acoustic guitar (10)
- Shane Keister – synthesizers (1, 5, 7), keyboards (3, 4, 6, 8, 9)
- David Foster – synthesizers (3, 6)
- Bill Payne – acoustic piano (5)
- Jon Goin – electric guitar (1, 7)
- Paul Jackson Jr. – electric guitar (1), guitars (5)
- Ray Parker Jr. – guitars (1, 7)
- Steve Lukather – electric guitar solo (1), lead guitar (3)
- Rafe Van Hoy – gut-string guitar (2, 10), acoustic guitar (3, 8)
- Paul Worley – electric guitar (3)
- Richie Zito – electric guitar (4–8)
- Charles Fearing – guitars (5)
- Steve Gibson – electric guitar (7), guitars (8)
- Bobby Thompson – acoustic guitar (9)
- Nathan East – bass (1, 5, 7)
- Bob Wray – bass (3, 8)
- Jack Williams – bass (4, 9)
- Mike Baird – drums (1, 6, 7)
- Larrie Londin – drums (2–4, 9)
- Ed Greene – drums (5)
- Kenny Buttrey – drums (8)
- Paulinho da Costa – percussion (1, 5)
- Farrell Morris – percussion (3, 4, 6–9)
- Eberhard Ramm – French horn (4, 9)
- Buddy Spicher – fiddle (10)
- Gene Page – arrangements (1, 5–7)
- Bergen White – orchestral arrangements (4, 9, 10)
- The Shelly Kurland Strings – strings (4, 9, 10)
- Shari Kramer – backing vocals (1, 4, 6)
- Dave Loggins – backing vocals (1, 4)
- Lisa Silver – backing vocals (1, 6)
- Diane Tidwell – backing vocals (1, 6)
- Tom Kelly – backing vocals (3, 5, 8)
- Denny Henson – backing vocals (7)
- Sealatron – backing vocals (8, 9)

=== Production ===
- Kyle Lehning – producer, engineer
- Tony Gottlieb – assistant producer, assistant engineer
- Bill Schnee – mixing at Cherokee Studios (Hollywood, California)
- George Marino – mastering at Sterling Sound (New York City, New York)
- Karen Sobel – album coordinator
- Susan Stein – product manager
- Bob Defrin – art direction
- Jim Houghton – photography
- Susan Joseph for Twin Trumpets Production – management
