= (You Bring Out) The Wild Side of Me =

1984 song by Dan Seals

Single by Dan Seals

from the album San Antone
- B-side: "One Friend"
- Released: June 1984
- Genre: Country
- Length: 3:21
- Label: EMI America
- Songwriter(s): Dan Seals
- Producer(s): Kyle Lehning

Dan Seals singles chronology
| "God Must Be a Cowboy" (1984) | "(You Bring Out) The Wild Side of Me" (1984) | "My Baby's Got Good Timing" (1984) |

"(You Bring Out) The Wild Side of Me" is a song written and recorded by American country music artist Dan Seals. It was released in June 1984 as the first single from his album San Antone. It peaked at No. 9 in mid-1984, thus becoming his second top ten hit on both the U.S. and Canadian country charts.

== Chart positions ==
| Chart (1984) | Peak position |
|---|---|
| US Hot Country Songs (Billboard) | 9 |
| Canadian RPM Country Tracks | 6 |
