= On Arrival =

Studio album by Dan Seals
- Released: February 28, 1990
- Recorded: 1989
- Studios: Morningstar Sound Studio (Hendersonville, Tennessee); Nightingale Studios (Nashville, Tennessee)
- Genre: Country
- Length: 37:22
- Label: Capitol
- Producer: Kyle Lehning

Dan Seals chronology
Rage On (1988)	On Arrival (1990)	Greatest Hits (1991)

Singles from On Arrival
- 1. "Love on Arrival" Released: January 1990; 2. "Good Times" Released: May 1990; 3. "Bordertown" Released: October 1990; 4. "Water Under the Bridge" Released: January 1991

Professional ratings
Review scores
Source	Rating
AllMusic	3/5 stars
Entertainment Weekly	C−

On Arrival is the eighth studio album by American country music artist Dan Seals. The album reached #13 on the Top Country Albums chart. "Love on Arrival" and "Good Times" were the first two singles which both reached #1 while the last two singles, "Bordertown" and "Water Under the Bridge" only reached #49 and #57, respectively. "Good Times", which was his last #1 single and last Top 40 hit, was originally performed by Sam Cooke. "Made for Lovin' You" was also recorded by Clinton Gregory on his 1990 debut album Music 'n Me, and would later be a Top Ten hit for Doug Stone who released it from his 1992 album From the Heart.

== Track listing ==
No.	Title	Writer(s)	Length
1.	"Good Times"	Sam Cooke	3:34
2.	"Made for Lovin' You"	Curly Putman, Sonny Throckmorton	2:50
3.	"She Flew the Coupe"	Roger D. Ferris	4:17
4.	"Wood"	Dan Seals	4:14
5.	"Bordertown"	Bob McDill, Seals	3:57
6.	"Water Under the Bridge"	Bruce Burch, J.P. McMeans	3:08
7.	"Love on Arrival"	Seals	3:51
8.	"A Heart in Search of Love"	Charlie Black, Rory Bourke	3:38
9.	"Lonestar"	Seals, JD Souther	3:57
10.	"Game of Love"	Paul Brady	4:09

== Personnel ==
Adapted from liner notes.

- Dan Seals – lead vocals, backing vocals (1, 3, 4, 6, 8, 10)
- Barry Beckett – acoustic piano (1)
- Mike Lawler – organ (1, 3), electronic percussion (3), synthesizers (6–8), synth horns (7), tambourine (7), acoustic piano (8)
- Shane Keister – synthesizers (2, 6, 8, 10), acoustic piano (10)
- Kyle Lehning – synthesizers (2, 4, 9, 10), electric guitar (8, 9)
- Hargus "Pig" Robbins – acoustic piano (2, 4, 6, 9)
- Bill Cuomo – synthesizers (3), Wurlitzer electric piano (5), electric piano (9)
- John Barlow Jarvis – electric piano (4, 7)
- Larry Byrom – electric guitar (1, 2, 6–8, 10), electric slide guitar (3), acoustic guitar (4, 5, 9)
- Kenny Greenberg – electric guitar (1)
- Steve Gibson – electric guitar (2), gut-string guitar (5)
- Joe Stanley – acoustic guitar (2, 4, 6–8, 10), electric guitar (4–8, 10), mandolin (4), 12-string guitar (7, 8)
- Billy Joe Walker Jr. – acoustic guitar (2, 3, 5, 6, 8, 9), electric guitar (10)
- Brent Rowan – electric guitar (3–5, 7, 9)
- Brent Mason – electric guitar (7)
- Doyle Grisham – steel guitar (2, 6, 8, 10)
- Paul Franklin – lap steel guitar (3), steel guitar (5, 9, 10)
- David Hungate – bass (1, 3–7, 9, 10)
- Bob Wray – bass (2, 8)
- Eddie Bayers – drums (1, 2, 6, 8, 10)
- Paul Leim – drums (3–5, 7, 9)
- Terry McMillan – congas (1), tambourine (1, 8), harmonica (3), shaker (3), knee (8)
- Farrell Morris – African talking drum (4), castanets (5), marimba (5), shaker (5), congas (10), cymbals (10), triangle (10)
- Jim Horn – tenor saxophone (1), baritone saxophone (3)
- Mark O'Connor – fiddle (4)
- Sheri Huffman – backing vocals (2, 5, 7)
- Lisa Silver – backing vocals (2, 5, 7)
- Diane Vanette – backing vocals (2, 7)
- Beth Nielsen Chapman – backing vocals (5, 9), vocal responses (5)
- Wendy Suits Johnson – backing vocals (5)
- Jim Photogolo – backing vocals (5, 9)
- Harry Stinson – backing vocals (5, 9)
- Vince Gill – backing vocals (6)
- Billy Thomas – backing vocals (6)

Handclaps on "Good Times"

- John Condon, Kyle Lehning and Dan Seals

=== Production ===
- Kyle Lehning – producer, tracking engineer, overdub engineer, mixing
- Kirt Odle – tracking engineer, overdub engineer, additional assistant engineer
- Joseph Bogan – additional tracking engineer
- Tom Knox – overdub engineer, mix assistant
- John Condon – tracking assistant, additional assistant engineer, assistant overdub engineer, mix assistant
- Mike Wisniewski – tracking assistant
- Gary Paczosa – additional assistant engineer
- Doug Sax – mastering at The Mastering Lab (Hollywood, California)
- Virginia Team – art direction
- Jerry Joyner – design
- Mark Tucker – photography
- Vanessa Ware – stylist
- Tony Gottlieb – management

== Chart performance ==
=== Weekly charts ===
Chart (1990)	Peak position
Canadian Albums (RPM)	88
US Top Country Albums (Billboard)	13

=== Year-end charts ===
Chart (1990)	Position
US Top Country Albums (Billboard)	51

=== Singles ===
Year	Single	Peak positions	
Year	Single	US Country	CAN Country
1990	"Love on Arrival"	1	1
1990	"Good Times"	1	1
1990	"Bordertown"	49	22
1991	"Water Under the Bridge"	57	33
