= God Must Be a Cowboy =

Single by Dan Seals

from the album Rebel Heart
- B-side: "Nothin' Left to Do but Cry"
- Released: January 1984
- Genre: Country
- Length: 3:05
- Label: Liberty
- Songwriter(s): Dan Seals
- Producer(s): Kyle Lehning

Dan Seals singles chronology
"You Really Go for the Heart" (1983)	"God Must Be a Cowboy" (1984)	"(You Bring Out) The Wild Side of Me" (1984)

"God Must Be a Cowboy" is a song written and recorded by American country music artist Dan Seals. It was released in January 1984 as the fourth and final single from his album Rebel Heart. It was also his first top 10 hit, reaching #10. It is the album's most successful single.

== Music video ==
The music video, directed by Neil Abramson, is one of three videos Seals filmed specially for his 1991 video compilation, A Portrait. The video shows Seals singing the song in the middle of a highway in a desert and also shows footage and photographs of a mix of ranches and cowboys in their typical lifestyle.

== Chart positions ==
Chart (1984)	Peak position
US Hot Country Songs (Billboard)	10
Canadian RPM Country Tracks	8
