= My Baby's Got Good Timing =

Single by Dan Seals

from the album San Antone
- B-side: "She Thinks I Still Care"
- Released: October 1984
- Genre: Country
- Length: 3:27
- Label: EMI America
- Songwriter(s): Bob McDill; Dan Seals
- Producer(s): Kyle Lehning

Dan Seals singles chronology
"(You Bring Out) The Wild Side of Me" (1984)	"My Baby's Got Good Timing" (1984)	"My Old Yellow Car" (1985)

"My Baby's Got Good Timing" is a song co-written and recorded by American country music artist Dan Seals. It was released in October 1984 as the second single from his album San Antone. It peaked at #2, thus becoming his first top 5 hit. The song was written by Seals and Bob McDill.

== Charts ==
=== Weekly charts ===
Chart (1984–1985)	Peak position
US Hot Country Songs (Billboard)	2
Canadian RPM Country Tracks	2

=== Year-end charts ===
Chart (1985)	Position
US Hot Country Songs (Billboard)	36
