= Love on Arrival =

Single by Dan Seals

from the album On Arrival
- B-side: "Those"
- Released: January 1990
- Recorded: August 1989
- Genre: Country
- Length: 3:51
- Label: Capitol
- Songwriter: Dan Seals
- Producer: Kyle Lehning

Dan Seals singles chronology
"They Rage On" (1989)	"Love on Arrival" (1990)	"Good Times" (1990)

"Love on Arrival" is a song written and recorded by American country music singer Dan Seals. It was released in January 1990 as the lead-off single from his album On Arrival. The song spent three weeks at No. 1 on Billboard Hot Country Singles & Tracks chart that April, making it the longest-running chart-topper of his career.

== Content ==
A 1950s-style rock 'n' roll tune with a prominent saxophone, the singer and his girlfriend communicate using common abbreviations, such as PDQ, TGIF (although here, it means "Thank God I found" you) and TLC. The other abbreviation is "LOA," which is short for the title lyric ("love on arrival"), which the girlfriend promises to her long-absent beau once he arrives home.

== Chart positions ==
Chart (1990)	Peak position
Canada Country Singles (RPM)	1
US Hot Country Songs (Billboard)	1

=== Year-end charts ===
Chart (1990)	Position
Canada Country Tracks (RPM)	56
US Country Songs (Billboard)	12

== Cover Versions ==
Bluegrass group Doyle Lawson & Quicksilver covered the song on their 2011 album, Drive Time.
