= Fired Up (Dan Seals album) =

Studio album by Dan Seals
- Released: August 16, 1994
- Studio: Sound Stage Studios, Javelina Studios and Frontstage Studio (Nashville, Tennessee); Image Recording Studios (Los Angeles, California)
- Genre: Country
- Length: 35:45
- Label: Warner Bros.
- Producer: Jerry Crutchfield

Dan Seals chronology
Walking the Wire (1992)	Fired Up (1994)	In a Quiet Room (1995)

Professional ratings
Review scores
Source	Rating
Allmusic	3/5 stars

Fired Up is a studio album released by country music artist Dan Seals. It was released in 1994 under the Warner Bros. label. It produced two unsuccessful singles. The song, "Gentleman of Leisure" was written by Folk Rock musician, Jesse Winchester who would later record it for his 1999 album of the same name.

== Track listing ==
1. "All Fired Up" (Dennis Morgan, Steve Davis, Bobby Lee Springfield) - 2:35
2. "Love Thing" (Michael Jordan, Jim Weatherly) - 3:51
3. "A Rose from Another Garden" (Joe Doyle, Glen Davies) - 3:10
4. "Hillbilly Fever" (Doyle, Todd Wilkes) - 3:01
5. "When" (Robert Ellis Orrall, Giles Goddard) - 3:26
6. "Call Me Up" (Josh Leo, Harry Stinson) - 3:13
7. "Jayney" (Johnny Nestor) - 3:23
8. "A Good Place to Be" (Rory Michael Bourke, Charlie Black) - 3:33
9. "Gentleman of Leisure" (Jesse Winchester) - 4:13
10. "Still Reelin' (From Those Rock & Roll Days)" (Dan Seals, Allen Shamblin) - 5:23

== Personnel ==
- Dan Seals – lead vocals, backing vocals
- John Barlow Jarvis – acoustic piano
- Matt Rollings – acoustic piano, synthesizers
- Steve Gibson – acoustic guitar, mandolin
- Brent Rowan – electric guitar, lead guitar, tremolo guitar, 6-string bass
- Biff Watson – acoustic guitar
- Brent Mason – guitars
- Billy Joe Walker Jr. – guitars
- Reggie Young – guitars
- Bruce Bouton – steel guitar
- Paul Franklin – steel guitar, pedal dobro
- David Hungate – bass
- Dave Pomeroy – bass
- Eddie Bayers – drums, tambourine
- Craig Krampf – drums
- Kenny Sears – fiddle
- Terry McMillan – harmonica
- Gove Scrivenor – autoharp
- Jim Horn – saxophones
- Robert Green – baritone saxophone
- Quitman Dennis – trombone
- Gary Burr – backing vocals
- Curtis Young – backing vocals
- Dennis Wilson – backing vocals

=== Production ===
- Martha Sharp – A&R direction
- Jerry Crutchfield – producer
- Ginny Johnson – production coordinator
- Virginia Team – art direction
- Jerry Joyner – design
- Neal Preston – photography
- Tony Gottlieb for Morningstar Management – management

Technical credits

- Denny Purcell – mastering at Georgetown Masters (Nashville, Tennessee) (1–9)
- Glenn Meadows – mastering at Masterfonics (Nashville, Tennessee) (10)
- Tim Kish – overdub recording
- Chuck Ainlay – recording (1, 5), mixing (3, 4, 7–9), additional overdub recording
- Chris Lord-Alge – mixing (1, 2, 5, 6, 10)
- Lynn Peterzell – recording (2–4, 6–10)
- Robert Charles – overdub assistant
- Craig White – overdub assistant, recording assistant (2–4, 6–10), mix assistant (3, 4, 7–9)
- Graham Lewis – additional overdub assistant, mix assistant (3, 4, 7–9)
- John Thomas – mix assistant (3, 4, 7–9)

== Singles ==
Year	Single	US Country
1994	"All Fired Up"	66
1994	"Love Thing"	-
