= Won't Be Blue Anymore =

Studio album by Dan Seals
- Released: 1985
- Studios: Emerald, Audio Media, and Master's Touch (Nashville, Tennessee); Morningstar (Hendersonville, Tennessee); The Bennett House (Franklin, Tennessee)
- Genre: Country
- Length: 40:00
- Label: EMI America
- Producers: Kyle Lehning (all tracks); Paul Worley (track 8)

Dan Seals chronology
| San Antone (1984) | Won't Be Blue Anymore (1985) | On the Front Line (1986) |

Singles from Won't Be Blue Anymore
- 1. "Meet Me in Montana" Released: July 1985; 2. "Bop" Released: October 1985; 3. "Everything That Glitters (Is Not Gold)" Released: March 1986

Professional ratings
Review scores
| Source | Rating |
|---|---|
| AllMusic | 2.5/5 stars |

Won't Be Blue Anymore is the fifth studio album by American country music artist Dan Seals. It was his most successful studio album; the only one to reach No. 1 on the Top Country Albums chart. The album featured some of Seals most popular songs, including "Bop" and "Meet Me in Montana", a duet with Marie Osmond. These and the third single, "Everything That Glitters (Is Not Gold)", all reached No. 1 on the Hot Country Songs chart. "Bop" was a major crossover hit, peaking at No. 10 on the Hot Adult Contemporary Tracks chart. The compact disc format of this album was released on the album's initial release. It has been out-of-print for more than 20 years and is highly collectible.

== Track listing ==
| No. | Title | Writer(s) | Length |
|---|---|---|---|
| 1. | "Headin West" | Dan Seals | 3:00 |
| 2. | "I Won't Be Blue Anymore" | Seals | 3:03 |
| 3. | "Everything That Glitters (Is Not Gold)" | Seals, Bob McDill | 4:50 |
| 4. | "Tobacco Road" | John D. Loudermilk | 3:15 |
| 5. | "Your Love" | Beckie Foster, Tommy Rocco | 3:00 |
| 6. | "You Plant Your Fields" | Wendy Waldman, Donny Lowery | 3:34 |
| 7. | "Still a Little Bit of Love" | Jim Scott, Walker Inglehart | 4:09 |
| 8. | "Meet Me in Montana" (duet with Marie Osmond) | Paul Davis | 3:54 |
| 9. | "Bop" | Jennifer Kimball, Davis | 3:45 |
| 10. | "So Easy to Need" | John Porter McMeans | 4:02 |
| 11. | "City Kind of Girl" | Robert Gundry | 3:28 |

== Personnel ==
- Dan Seals – lead vocals, backing vocals
- Barry Beckett – acoustic piano (1, 2, 7, 10), Wurlitzer electric piano (4), electric piano (5)
- Shane Keister – acoustic piano (2, 10), Fairlight CMI (6, 7, 10), synthesizers (9), Yamaha DX7 (10)
- Dennis Burnside – electric piano (3), acoustic piano (8)
- David Innis – synthesizers (8)
- Paul Davis – Synclavier (9), drum programming (9)
- Bob Gundry – acoustic piano (11), electric guitar solos (11), LinnDrum programming (11), arrangements (11)
- Larry Byrom – electric guitar (1, 2, 4, 5, 7, 10)
- Brent Mason – guitar solos (1)
- Joe Stanley – acoustic guitar (1, 4, 7, 10), electric guitar fills (3), electric guitar solo (4), guitars (9)
- Bobby Thompson – acoustic guitar (1, 4, 5, 7, 10)
- Rafe Van Hoy – acoustic guitar (2, 3, 11)
- Kenny Mims – electric guitar (3)
- Steve Gibson – electric guitar fills (5), electric guitar (8), guitars (9)
- Larry Shell – acoustic guitar (6)
- Wendy Waldman – acoustic guitar (6), backing vocals (6)
- Greg Jennings – electric guitar (7, 11)
- Paul Worley – acoustic guitar (8)
- John Porter McMeans – electric guitar (10)
- Jerry Douglas – dobro (1, 2, 4, 7)
- Doyle Grisham – steel guitar (2, 3)
- Sonny Garrish – steel guitar (8)
- David Hungate – bass (1, 2, 4, 5, 7, 10, 11)
- Bob Wray – bass (3)
- Michael Rhodes – bass (8)
- Larrie Londin – drums (1, 2, 4, 5, 7, 10, 11)
- Eddie Bayers – drums (3, 8, 11)
- Kyle Lehning – drum programming (9)
- Farrell Morris – percussion (4–6)
- Mark O'Connor – fiddle (4–6)
- Jim Horn – saxophone (9)
- Bergen White – string arrangements (8)
- Marie Osmond – lead vocals (8)
- The Cherry Sisters (Sheri Huffman, Lisa Silver and Diane Tidwell)– backing vocals (9)

Production

- Kyle Lehning – producer, track engineer, overdub recording, mixing, basic track recording (9)
- Paul Worley – co-producer (8)
- Joseph Bogan – track engineer
- Marshall Morgan – basic track recording (8)
- Russ Martin – assistant engineer
- Kirt Odle – assistant engineer, overdub assistant, mix assistant, basic tracking assistant (9)
- Gene Eichelberger – basic tracking assistant (8)
- Doug Sax – mastering at The Mastering Lab (Hollywood, California)
- Henry Marquez – art direction
- Carol Chen – design
- Alan Dockery – photography
- Paul Maxon – photography

== Charts ==
=== Weekly charts ===
| Chart (1985–1986) | Peak position |
|---|---|
| Canada Albums (RPM) | 37 |
| US Billboard 200 | 59 |
| US Top Country Albums (Billboard) | 1 |

=== Year-end charts ===
| Chart (1986) | Position |
|---|---|
| US Top Country Albums (Billboard) | 14 |

=== Singles ===
| Year | Single | Peak chart positions | | | | | |
| Year | Single | US Country | US | US AC | CAN Country | CAN | CAN AC |
|---|---|---|---|---|---|---|---|
| 1985 | "Meet Me in Montana" (featuring Marie Osmond) | 1 | — | — | 19 | — | — |
| 1985 | "Bop" | 1 | 42 | 10 | 1 | 1 | 6 |
| 1986 | "Everything That Glitters (Is Not Gold)" | 1 | — | — | 1 | — | — |
