= Big Wheels in the Moonlight =

Single by Dan Seals

from the album Rage On
- B-side: "Factory Town"
- Released: September 1988
- Genre: Country
- Length: 3:54
- Label: Capitol
- Songwriter(s): Bob McDill; Dan Seals
- Producer(s): Kyle Lehning

Dan Seals singles chronology
"Addicted" (1988)	"Big Wheels in the Moonlight" (1988)	"They Rage On" (1989)

"Big Wheels in the Moonlight" is a song co-written and recorded by American country music artist Dan Seals. It was released in September 1988 as the second single from Seals' album Rage On. It peaked at number one, his ninth to do so. The song was written by Seals and Bob McDill.

== Content ==
The song—one of many in country music to pay salute to the American truck driver—is about a young man's childhood memories of watching semitrailer trucks travel along a nearby highway, listening at night to the roar of the trucks' diesel engines in the distance and dreaming one day of being a truck driver. The dream never comes to pass, as he begins a family and is working at other jobs, but still finds peace in envisioning the trucks in his mind, the trucks illuminated only by their lights and the moonlight of a clear evening.

== Music video ==
The music video was directed by Neil Abramson, and was one of three videos filmed specially for Seals' 1991 video compilation, A Portrait.

== Chart positions ==
Chart (1988–1989)	Peak position
US Hot Country Songs (Billboard)	1
Canadian RPM Country Tracks	1

=== Year-end charts ===
Chart (1989)	Position
Canada Country Tracks (RPM)	14
US Country Songs (Billboard)	24
