= My Old Yellow Car =

Single by Dan Seals

from the album San Antone
- B-side: "Oh These Nights"
- Released: February 1985
- Genre: Country
- Length: 3:36
- Label: EMI America
- Songwriter(s): Thom Schuyler
- Producer(s): Kyle Lehning

Dan Seals singles chronology
"My Baby's Got Good Timing" (1984)	"My Old Yellow Car" (1985)	"Meet Me in Montana" (1985)

"My Old Yellow Car" is a song written by Thom Schuyler, and recorded by American country music artist Dan Seals. It was released in February 1985 as the third and final single from his album San Antone. It peaked at #9 in early-1985.

It was also recorded by Lacy J. Dalton on her 1980 album Lacy J. Dalton, but her version was never released as a single.

== Content ==
The narrator of the song nostalgically describes his/her first car, which was old and battered, but was the source of many fond memories. Although the narrator is now wealthy and riding in a chauffeur-driven luxury car, the narrator wishes he/she were still driving that old yellow car.

== Chart positions ==
Chart (1985)	Peak position
US Hot Country Songs (Billboard)	9
Canadian RPM Country Tracks	9
