= Cheryl Wheeler =

American folk singer and songwriter (born 1951)

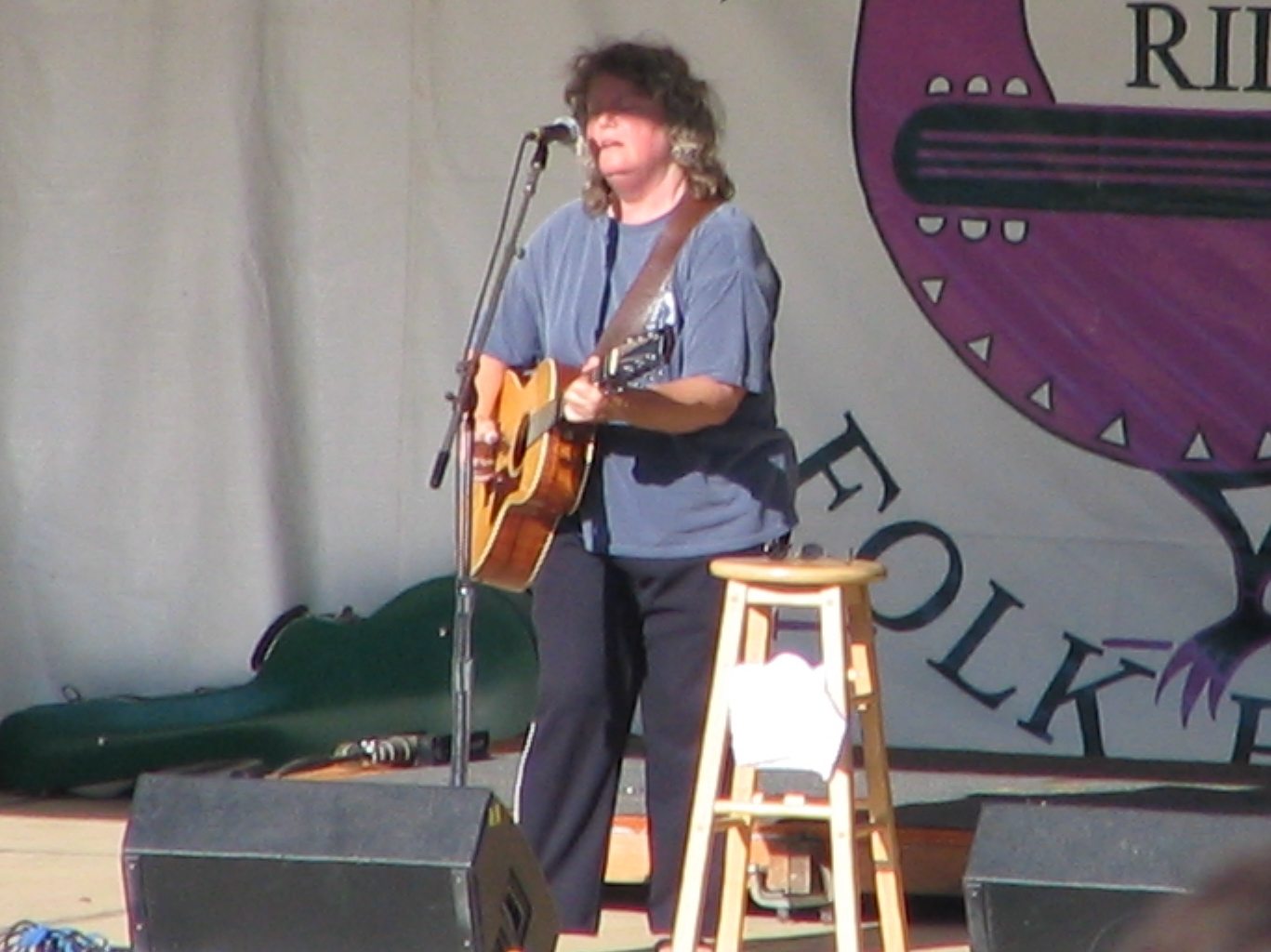
- Cheryl Wheeler performing live at the Falcon Ridge Folk Festival in July 2006.

Background information
- Born: July 10, 1951 (age 74)
- Origin: Timonium, Maryland, United States
- Genres: Folk; country
- Occupation: Singer-songwriter
- Instruments: Vocals; guitar
- Years active: 1976–present
- Labels: Capitol; Philo/Rounder; Dias
- Spouse: Cathleen (m. 2004)

Cheryl Wheeler (born July 10, 1951) is an American singer-songwriter of contemporary folk music. She has recorded thirteen folk albums to date and has toured extensively throughout the United States since the mid-1970s.

Because of her music, Wheeler has been praised as a “folk luminary,” an “unassuming folk star,” and a “folk diva.”

The Boston Globe wrote: “Over decades, she’s built a cult following through Boston radio and the New England folk circuit for her uncanny ability, not unlike Tom Rush, to have her audience laughing during one song and silently tearing up with the next.” “If Wheeler never picked up an instrument, she could have easily become a comedian,” said another reviewer. “Fortunately for us, she does both. Because, after the jokes, stories and self-deprecating comments have people rolling in the aisles, she starts singing, and her voice is spellbinding.”

== Early life ==
Born and raised in Timonium, Maryland, Wheeler began playing ukulele and guitar in middle school and writing songs in high school, making up melodies to go with the poems in “The Golden Book of Poetry,” a children's book. Wheeler completed two years of community college and then transferred to Coker College in South Carolina. She quit in early 1972. “I didn’t quit thinking: Do I embark on a folk music career?” she said. “I quit because I was in 15th grade, and enough was enough already.”

Not long after leaving college, Wheeler was hired at a steakhouse as a waitress. “Within a week, the owners and me, we realized we made a terrible mistake,” she said. "I could never be a waitress. But they needed [a musician], and I thought maybe I could do that, and they were relieved to get me out of waitressing." Around the same time, Wheeler began performing at clubs in the Washington, D.C., and Baltimore area.

== Career ==
In 1976, Wheeler moved to Providence, Rhode Island, and began playing at folk clubs throughout New England, opening for artists such as Jonathan Edwards, Tom Rush, Jesse Winchester, and Gordon Lightfoot. Her big break came when Edwards asked her to audition for a spot in his band as a bass player. Wheeler didn't play bass, but she bought one and auditioned nonetheless. "To my complete astonishment, I got the gig," Wheeler recalled. "But I knew I didn't get it for my bass playing. So I thought I must've got it for my singing. So that was a real shot in the arm because I hadn't thought about it before, but I thought I might actually be a good singer if Jonathan Edwards is hiring me."

In 1983, Wheeler released her first album, a four-song EP called Newport Songs, which is now out of print. Her next two releases – a self-titled album in 1986 and Half a Book in 1987 – were produced by North Star Records in Providence. The song “Addicted,” from the self-titled album, was recorded by country singer Dan Seals and became a No. 1 hit for him in 1988 on Billboard's Top 40 Country chart.

Following the success of her first two full-length albums, Wheeler was signed to Capitol Records and released Circles and Arrows in 1990. Suzy Bogguss recorded Wheeler's song “Aces” from this album, and it reached #9 on the country charts in 1992. Wheeler's next four albums – Driving Home (1993), Mrs. Pinocci's Guitar (1995), Sylvia Hotel (1999), and Defying Gravity (2005) – were produced by the folk-oriented Philo-Rounder Records in Cambridge, Massachusetts.

In 2003, Wheeler approved the production of a double disc album, No Previous Record, which contains songs that never made it onto a commercial recording. Distribution of the album is free, but restricted to members of her e-mail list.

Wheeler's two most-recent albums – Pointing at the Sun (2009) and Cheryl Wheeler Live (2012) – were released by her own record label, Dias Records.

Wheeler's songs have been covered by a number of other artists in addition to Dan Seals and Suzy Bogguss. They include Kathy Mattea, Sylvia, Garth Brooks, Peter, Paul, and Mary, Bette Midler, Kenny Loggins, Melanie, Holly Near, and D.C. Anderson. Wheeler has said she doesn't purposefully write for other people, but she appreciates when others cover her songs. “[It’s] great. I make money if they do well,” she said. "But more than that, it's wonderful to have a singer you respect singing your song."

Her song "If It Were Up to Me" (which was written shortly after the 1998 Westside Middle School shooting), with the closing line "If it were up to me, I'd take away the guns" got nationwide attention shortly after the Columbine High School massacre. Wheeler released the recording into the public domain to exempt radio stations from paying royalties (it was being played every hour near the high school), and Rounder Records ran a promotional campaign to donate money to the Brady Campaign each time the song was played on Adult Album Alternative radio stations.

In 2014, Wheeler was inducted into the Rhode Island Music Hall of Fame.

== Performances ==
Wheeler has toured extensively throughout her career, and her live concerts include both comedic and serious commentary in addition to the songs themselves. As one reviewer wrote, she “masterfully blends blisteringly on-target observational humor, simple storytelling, gorgeous guitar work, and beautiful, rich songs.” Another commented on her “free-wheeling live concerts” and called Wheeler a “thoughtful, amusing musician and storyteller (and irrepressible social critic)…. [H]er patter is a delicious, folk-flavored blend of Phyllis Diller and Mort Sahl, sometimes puckish, sometimes barbed.”

About half of the songs Wheeler performs in concert are not available on any of her albums. Many never get recorded and eventually fade from her set list. Although she mostly tours alone, she has also toured with Kenny White (who produced a number of her albums). White generally opens for her and then plays and sings harmony during Wheeler's set. Wheeler has also toured with the Christine Lavin-inspired tour "On a Winter's Night" and occasionally as part of Lavin's consortium Four Bitchin' Babes.

Wheeler participated in a concert with fellow folk singer-songwriters Shawn Colvin and Mary Chapin Carpenter in 1988, the year before Colvin released her debut album. The three performed on two consecutive nights, to critical acclaim, at The Birchmere in Alexandria, Virginia. The two performances were recorded at the soundboard and although never released officially, have been favorites among fans of the three artists.

== Personal life ==
Wheeler is openly lesbian. She and her wife, Cathleen, live in Swansea, Massachusetts. They were married in 2004, ten days after Massachusetts made same-sex marriage legal.

In October 2022, her management announced that her forthcoming concerts were cancelled due to hospitalization for mental health challenges. She returned to performing in 2023.

== Discography ==
Most of the following albums are still in print:

=== Studio albums ===
- Cheryl Wheeler (1985)
- Half a Book (1987)
- Circles and Arrows (1990)
- Driving Home (1993)
- Mrs. Pinocci's Guitar (1995)
- Sylvia Hotel (1999)
- Defying Gravity (2005)
- Pointing at the Sun (2009)
- Greetings: Cheryl Wheeler Live (feat. Kenny White) (2012)

=== EPs ===
- Newport Songs (1983)
- Live and Otherwise (1987)

=== Compilation albums ===
- Different Stripe (2000)
- No Previous Record (2003)

=== Other contributions ===
- Live at the World Café - Volume 9 (1999) – "If It Were Up to Me"
