= Everything That Glitters (Is Not Gold) =

Single by Dan Seals

from the album Won't Be Blue Anymore
- B-side: "So Easy to Need"
- Released: March 1986
- Genre: Country
- Length: 4:50
- Label: EMI America
- Songwriters: Bob McDill; Dan Seals
- Producer: Kyle Lehning

Dan Seals singles chronology
"Bop" (1985)	"Everything That Glitters (Is Not Gold)" (1986)	"You Still Move Me" (1986)

"Everything That Glitters (Is Not Gold)" is a song co-written and recorded by American country music artist Dan Seals. It was released in March 1986 as the third single from the album Won't Be Blue Anymore. It peaked at number one in both the United States and Canada. The song was written by Seals and Bob McDill.

== Content ==
The song's narrator has an estranged wife popular on the national livestock rodeo circuit who left him alone to raise their daughter Casey. He and Casey compete at various regional rodeo competitions, and the narrator mentions Casey's constant curiosity about her mother throughout their travels. Casey is also approaching puberty, and he falls short of answers to her questions, especially since his wife does not keep in contact with them. Despite the estrangement and the bitterness he now feels, he sometimes remembers wistfully the way he felt about her when he was in love with her, but that he now seemingly believes she wasn't cut out to be a wife and mother.

== Music video ==
Two music videos of the song exist:

The first, a live performance of the song, appeared in 1986 to support the single.

A music video of the song, directed by Neil Abramson, appeared in Seals' video compilation, A Portrait (1991).

== Chart positions ==
Chart (1986)	Peak position
US Hot Country Songs (Billboard)	1
Canadian RPM Country Tracks	1

== Cover versions ==
- Bluegrass singer Dede Wyland covered the song on her 2009 album Keep the Light On.
- Balsam Range recorded a version of the song for their 2014 album Five.
- Canadian country music artist Drake Jensen covered the song in his 2015 album Retro.
- Country singer Luke Bryan and Dan Seals covered the song in 2025 as a single.
