= Dan Seals =

American singer-songwriter (1948–2009)

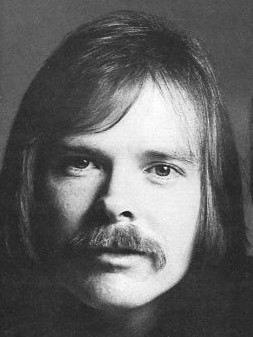
- Seals in 1976

Background information
- Also known as: England Dan
- Born: Danny Wayland Seals; February 8, 1948; McCamey, Texas, U.S.
- Died: March 25, 2009 (aged 61) Nashville, Tennessee, U.S.
- Genres: Country; soft rock
- Occupations: Singer; songwriter
- Instruments: Vocals; guitar
- Years active: 1966–2009
- Labels: Atlantic; Liberty; Capitol; Warner Bros.; Intersound; TDC; Lightyear
- Formerly of: Theze Few; Southwest F.O.B.; England Dan & John Ford Coley

Danny Wayland Seals (February 8, 1948 – March 25, 2009), also known as England Dan, was an American musician. The younger brother of Seals & Crofts member Jim Seals, he first gained fame as one half of the soft rock duo England Dan & John Ford Coley, who charted nine singles between 1976 and 1980, including the No. 2 Billboard Hot 100 hit "I'd Really Love to See You Tonight".

After the duo disbanded, Seals began a solo career, starting in soft rock then shifting to country music. Throughout the 1980s and into the early 1990s, he released 16 studio albums and charted more than 20 singles on the country charts. Eleven of his singles reached number one: "Meet Me in Montana" (with Marie Osmond), "Bop" (also a No. 42 pop hit), "Everything That Glitters (Is Not Gold)", "You Still Move Me", "I Will Be There", "Three Time Loser", "One Friend", "Addicted", "Big Wheels in the Moonlight", "Love on Arrival", and "Good Times". Five more of his singles also reached top ten on the same chart.

== Background ==
Danny Wayland Seals was born in McCamey, Texas. Dan's childhood nickname of "England Dan" was given to him by his older brother Jim Seals (later of Seals and Crofts). It was also Jim's idea to incorporate the name "England Dan" into England Dan & John Ford Coley. The nickname was a reference to the fact that, as a youngster, Dan had fixated on the Beatles and briefly affected an English accent.

== Collaboration with John Ford Coley ==
Seals joined with fellow W. W. Samuell High School classmate and longtime friend John Ford Coley to perform first as part of Theze Few then as Dallas pop/psych group Southwest F.O.B. ('Freight on Board'), whose material has been re-released on CD by the Sundazed label, and then as one half of the duo England Dan & John Ford Coley. In 1970, the latter were signed by A&M Records, but a lack of US hits led to them being dropped two years later. Seals later recalled that this led to a period of severe financial challenge which ended only when the duo signed to Big Tree Records and had a run of six US top 40 hits from the mid-1970s, beginning with "I'd Really Love to See You Tonight", the pair's biggest hit, reaching No. 2 in 1976 and becoming their only gold single. Their other hits include "Nights Are Forever Without You" (No. 10 in 1976–77); "It's Sad to Belong" (No. 21) and "Gone Too Far" (No. 23), both in 1977; "We'll Never Have to Say Goodbye Again" (No. 9 in 1978); and their last top 40 hit, "Love Is the Answer" (No. 10 in May 1979). After seven LPs, they disbanded in 1980 and Seals reinvented himself as a solo country-pop artist, signing with Atlantic Records in 1980.

== Solo career ==
When Seals signed to Capitol Records in 1983 he shifted to Nashville and began to record as Dan Seals. He initially struggled, but his voice and sentimental manner suited Nashville at a time when country music began to soften its rural styling. Seals's solo career began to turn around with the single "God Must Be a Cowboy,” the fourth and final single of his 1983 album Rebel Heart. The song peaked at No. 10 on the Billboard Country Singles chart, becoming the first in a string of 16 consecutive top ten and number one singles that stretched to 1990. A 1985 duet with Marie Osmond, "Meet Me in Montana,” reached No. 1 and Seals followed this with a run of eight chart-toppers. More hits followed, including his 11th country No. 1 with a cover of Sam Cooke's "Good Times" in 1990. Just as the pop rock market had changed radically in the 1980s, so did country music in the 1990s with the arrival of Garth Brooks's turbo-charged anthems. Seals devoted more time to his family and his religion, the Baháʼí Faith, though he continued to record and tour; he performed at the Baháʼí World Congress in 1992.

== Albums ==
=== Stones and Harbinger ===
He kept the name England Dan for his debut album, Stones. Although no single charted on the country chart, his first single ever as a solo artist "Late at Night" did peak at No. 57 on the US Hot 100. Otherwise, it was unsuccessful. His next album, Harbinger, was unsuccessful commercially. None of its singles charted, and he turned his attention to country music and adapted his style to fit country radio's demands while still keeping his signature soft sound. He signed to Capitol Records in 1983.

=== Rebel Heart ===
1983's Rebel Heart, his first album for Capitol, was much more successful than his first two albums. The first single, "Everybody's Dream Girl," peaked at No. 18. The next single "After You," however, charted lower, at No. 28. "You Really Go for the Heart" was even less successful, but still managed to crack the top 40, reaching No. 37. The album's last single, "God Must Be a Cowboy," was much more successful than the album's first three singles, becoming his first top 10 hit in early 1984, at No. 10. The album peaked at No. 40 on the country albums chart, his first album to enter Top Country Albums.

=== San Antone ===
His 1984 album San Antone was even more successful. "(You Bring Out) The Wild Side of Me," the album's first single, reached No. 9. The next single "My Baby's Got Good Timing" became his first Top 5, at No. 2. In early 1985, the album's third and final single "My Old Yellow Car" peaked at No. 9. This album peaked at No. 24 on the country albums chart.

=== Won't Be Blue Anymore ===
His 1985 album Won't Be Blue Anymore became his most successful studio album, reaching No. 1 on the country albums chart and earning RIAA gold certification. "Meet Me in Montana," a duet with Marie Osmond, became his first No. 1 hit in 1985 and the first of nine straight Number Ones. Written by Paul Davis, the single won the artists the Vocal Duo of the Year Award at the CMA awards in 1986. The album's next single, "Bop," also co-written by Paul Davis, with Jennifer Kimball, became his first solo No. 1 and was named Single of the Year at 1986's CMA awards. After it came "Everything That Glitters (Is Not Gold)," about a rodeo cowboy having to cope with single parenthood (written by Seals and fellow Texan Bob McDill).

=== On the Front Line ===
On the Front Line reached No. 12 on the country albums chart. The three singles from it all reached No. 1 in 1987: "You Still Move Me,” "I Will Be There," and "Three Time Loser.”

=== The Best ===
Dan Seals released his first compilation album The Best in 1987. All of the songs included on the album were top ten hits. The lone new track "One Friend," which was originally included on 1984's San Antone, was re-recorded for this collection and continued his No. 1 streak. The album peaked at No. 7 and was certified platinum.

=== Rage On ===
1988 saw the release of Dan Seals' Rage On album. The first single, "Addicted," not only became a No. 1 country hit but also got its writer, Cheryl Wheeler, a contract with Capitol Records in 1989. The next single, the truck driving song "Big Wheels in the Moonlight," was released in late 1988, and reached No. 1 in early 1989, becoming his ninth No. 1 single in a row. This streak was broken when the album's third and final single, "They Rage On," peaked at No. 5. The album peaked at No. 6, and is the second highest peaking of his albums.

=== On Arrival ===
Dan Seals began the 1990s with his eighth album, On Arrival. The first single "Love on Arrival" reached No. 1 in 1990, and stayed there for three weeks. After it came a cover of the Sam Cooke standard "Good Times." This cover was not only his last Number One, but also his last Top 40 hit, as the album's next two tracks ("Bordertown" and "Water Under the Bridge") failed to reach the top 40 in the United States, although they did in Canada.

=== Greatest Hits ===
Dan Seals' second compilation album, titled Greatest Hits was released in 1991. It contained his hits from the albums Won't Be Blue Anymore, Rage On, and On Arrival, along with a new track, "Ball and Chain," which was not released as a single.

=== Walking the Wire ===
By this time, the country music landscape had changed abruptly, and Dan Seals found his style out of favor. He moved to Warner Bros. Records in 1991, and released Walking the Wire. Only three of the five singles released from this album ("Sweet Little Shoe," "Mason Dixon Line," and "When Love Comes Around the Bend") actually charted, but none of them reached the top 40. One other single, "We Are One," failed to chart. Additionally, the album failed to crack the top country albums chart.

== Later albums, death ==
Although Seals was a touring artist for the rest of the 1990s, he did release a few more albums on smaller labels throughout the decade, such as Fired Up in 1994, his final album for Warner Bros. He signed to Intersound and released In a Quiet Room in 1995, comprising acoustic versions of his earlier hits. He then switched to TDC and released In a Quiet Room II in 1998, followed by Make It Home in 2002.

In the early 2000s, Dan Seals embarked on various tours with his brother Jim (of Seals and Crofts), billing themselves as Seals & Seals, and performing their hits from Seals and Crofts and England Dan and John Ford Coley, Dan's hits from his solo career, and a few original songs co-written by the two brothers. A few shows featured Jim's sons Joshua on bass guitar and backing vocals, and Sutherland on electric guitar..

In 2008, Seals completed radiation treatments for cancer (mantle cell lymphoma) at Vanderbilt University Medical Center in Nashville and at MD Anderson Cancer Center in Houston, and received a stem cell transplant at the National Institutes of Health (NIH) in Maryland. He died at the age of 61, on March 25, 2009, at his daughter's home in Nashville.

Prior to Seals' death, he recorded a duet with Juice Newton, for her 2010 release Duets: Friends & Memories, covering Heart's 1986 hit "These Dreams." Four years after Seals' death, Kenny Rogers recorded Seals's composition "It's Gonna Be Easy Now." The track is featured as the closing number on Rogers' album You Can't Make Old Friends.

Dan Seals & Friends: The Last Duet, a posthumous tribute album pairing Seals's recordings with guest vocalists, is set for release on August 28, 2026, through Melody Place Records and the Dan Seals Estate, produced by Seals's longtime collaborator Kyle Lehning.

== Discography ==
=== Studio albums ===
- Stones (1980)
- Harbinger (1982)
- Rebel Heart (1983)
- San Antone (1984)
- Won't Be Blue Anymore (1985)
- On the Front Line (1986)
- Rage On (1988)
- On Arrival (1990)
- Walking the Wire (1992)
- Fired Up (1994)
- In a Quiet Room (1995)
- In a Quiet Room II (1998)
- Make It Home (2002)

=== Compilation albums ===
- The Best (1987)
- Portrait (1990)
- Early Dan Seals (1991)
- Greatest Hits (1991)
- The Best of Dan Seals (1994)
- Certified Hits (2001)
- The Best of Dan Seals (2005)

=== Billboard number-one hits ===
- "Meet Me in Montana" with Marie Osmond (1 week, 1985)
- "Bop" (1 week, 1986)
- "Everything That Glitters (Is Not Gold)" (1 week, 1986)
- "You Still Move Me" (1 week, 1987)
- "I Will Be There" (1 week, 1987)
- "Three Time Loser" (1 week, 1987)
- "One Friend" (1 week, 1988)
- "Addicted" (1 week, 1988)
- "Big Wheels in the Moonlight" (1 week, 1989)
- "Love on Arrival" (3 weeks, 1990)
- "Good Times" (2 weeks, 1990)

== Awards and nominations ==
=== Grammy Awards ===
Year	Nominee / work	Award	Result
1986	"Meet Me in Montana"	Best Country Performance by a Duo or Group with Vocal	Nominated
1989	"Addicted"	Best Male Country Vocal Performance	Nominated

=== American Music Awards ===
Year	Nominee / work	Award	Result
1987	"Everything That Glitters (Is Not Gold)"	Favorite Country Single	Nominated

=== Music City News Country Awards ===
Year	Nominee / work	Award	Result
1986	Dan Seals	Star of Tomorrow	Nominated
1986	Marie Osmond and Dan Seals	Vocal Duo of the Year	Nominated
1987	Marie Osmond and Dan Seals	Vocal Duo of the Year	Nominated
1987	"Bop"	Single of the Year	Nominated

=== Academy of Country Music Awards ===
Year	Nominee / work	Award	Result
1985	Dan Seals	Top New Male Vocalist	Nominated
1986	Dan Seals and Marie Osmond	Top Vocal Duo of the Year	Nominated
1987	"Everything That Glitters (Is Not Gold)"	Song of the Year	Nominated

=== Country Music Association Awards ===
Year	Nominee / work	Award	Result
1986	Dan Seals	Horizon Award	Nominated
1986	"Bop"	Single of the Year	Won
1986	Dan Seals and Marie Osmond	Vocal Duo of the Year	Won
1987	Dan Seals and Marie Osmond	Vocal Duo of the Year	Nominated

== Bibliography ==
- Lomax III, John (1998). "Dan Seals". In The Encyclopedia of Country Music. Paul Kingsbury, Editor. New York: Oxford University Press. pp. 474–5. ISBN 978-0195176087
