= Bop (Dan Seals song) =

1985 single by Dan Seals

Single by Dan Seals

from the album Won't Be Blue Anymore
- B-side: "In San Antone"
- Released: October 1985
- Genre: Country; dance-pop
- Length: 3:45
- Label: EMI America
- Songwriters: Paul Davis; Jennifer Kimball
- Producer: Kyle Lehning

Dan Seals singles chronology
"Meet Me in Montana" (1985)	"Bop" (1985)	"Everything That Glitters (Is Not Gold)" (1986)

"Bop" is a song written by Paul Davis and Jennifer Kimball and recorded by American country music artist Dan Seals. It was released in October 1985 as the second single from his fifth studio album, Won't Be Blue Anymore. It reached number one on the US Billboard Hot Country Singles chart in early 1986, becoming his second number-one hit on that chart and his first as a solo artist. It was a major crossover hit as well, peaking at number 42 on the Billboard Hot 100 and at number 10 on the Adult Contemporary chart. In Canada, it topped the RPM Top Singles and Country Singles charts.

== Music video ==
The music video, directed by George Bloom, shows an older couple preparing to travel to an armory. It concurrently shows flashbacks of the couple 30 years earlier. One of the highlights in the video is the 30-year flashback of the couple in a 1955 Ford Thunderbird that transforms 30 years later into the 1985 Ford Thunderbird. Towards the end of the video, it shows the couple in their elderly stages dancing at the armory along with many others with Seals performing the song onstage.

The video has not been included in Seals' 1991 video compilation, A Portrait, which also included the video for "They Rage On," plus three other videos for Seals' "God Must Be a Cowboy," "Everything That Glitters (Is Not Gold)" and "Big Wheels in the Moonlight" that were filmed especially for the compilation.

== Personnel ==
- Dan Seals – lead and backing vocals
- Shane Keister – synthesizers
- Paul Davis – Synclavier, drum programming
- Joe Stanley – guitar
- Steve Gibson – guitar
- Kyle Lehning – drum programming
- Jim Horn – saxophone
- The Cherry Sisters – backing vocals

== Charts ==
=== Weekly charts ===
Chart (1985–1986)	Peak position
Australia (Kent Music Report)	41
Canada Top Singles (RPM)	1
Canada Adult Contemporary (RPM)	6
Canada Country Singles (RPM)	1
Canada (The Record)	22
US Billboard Hot 100	42
US Adult Contemporary (Billboard)	10
US Hot Country Songs (Billboard)	1

=== Year-end charts ===
Chart (1986)	Position
Canada Top Singles (RPM)	41
Canada Country Tracks (RPM)	65
US Hot Country Songs (Billboard)	11

== Certifications ==
Region	Certification	Certified units/sales
Canada (Music Canada)	Gold	50,000^{^}
^{^} Shipments figures based on certification alone.
