= Jennifer Kimball =

American singer-songwriter

- Genres: Folk rock
- Occupations: Singer, songwriter
- Instruments: Vocals, guitar
- Years active: 1980s–present
- Labels: MCA, Elektra, Green Linnet, Epoisse, Philips, Imaginary Road
- Website: www.jenniferkimball.com

Jennifer Kimball is a singer and songwriter who formed the folk duo The Story with Jonatha Brooke.

== Career ==
Jennifer Kimball and Amherst College friend Jonatha Brooke began playing music together in the 1980s. They performed regularly during their college years. Their folk songs were marked by "witty wordplay and sumptuous pop harmonies," according to one music critic. Critics noted a resemblance between their music and earlier artists such as Joni Mitchell and Paul Simon in terms of excellent musicianship, singing, and writing. Kimball graduated from Amherst in 1986.

They called themselves The Story. One critic wrote "Jennifer Kimball played the Art Garfunkel role in The Story" and contributed "high ethereal harmonies." In 1989, the duo played the coffeehouse folk circuit and radio which exemplified the "folk-rock singer-songwriter aesthetic," according to one account. Kimball and Brooke "burst to fame" with this combination. They created a demo called Over Oceans and were promptly signed to the independent label Green Linnet which, in 1991, issued the duo's debut full-length album, Grace in Gravity. Later Elektra Records signed The Story and reissued their debut.

Their second album, The Angel in the House, was released in 1993. One critic raved about the "exquisite arrangements and tricky, pitch-perfect harmonies by Ms. Brooke and her vocal partner, Jennifer Kimball," and added they "are the last word in elegant folk-pop refinement." The album featured "moody jazz and Brazilian-flavored arrangements" and "the duo's harmonies, which usually begin in a comfortably folkish vein, frequently stray into precise chromatic dissonance" and had a "sophisticated international flavor." Their song "Over Oceans" was used as a background for dance by choreographer Kristen Caputo. The songs contemplate a woman's conflicting desires for love and achievement and the need to shake off the romantic myth of a male rescuer.

Another critic discussed the contrast between the patter between songs and the songs themselves, noting the duo's "levity" between heavy songs about "God, church, death, female oppression, self-suppression, mothers and daughters." Their songs adroitly avoided "heavy-handedness" with a certain "winning buoyancy of tune and/or spirit" with "sophisticated harmonic changes whose intriguing hooks come at you cockeyed and sideways more often than they swoop down from the heavens." The duo were compared with artists such as Suzanne Vega and Indigo Girls. Another reviewer gave the duo mixed reviews: "intriguingly distorted harmonies and interesting turns of phrase" but some "attempts at cleverness overreached" and there was "a painfully obvious unrecorded song about dieting and a silly, albeit self-consciously so, stab at voguing a la Madonna." Another wrote their "music can alternate between heart-rending poetry and infectious flights of fancy."

== Solo albums ==
Kimball and Brooke dissolved their musical partnership in 1994, while Kimball performed her songs in a variety of venues and continued to write music.

In 1998, Kimball released the album Veering from the Wave. A Washington Post critic applauded the singing as "handsome" and the songwriting as excellent. In 1999, Kimball opened for folk artists such as Tom Rush. In 2000, she was a featured performer at the Eli Whitney Folk Festival in New Haven. Her song "Meet Me in the Twilight" received radio airplay, including on San Francisco station KPFA. She's recorded with other artists including Wayfaring Strangers, Session Americana and Tony Trischka. Kimball's music has been described as "quirky and oh-so-urban suburban" and a "sultry roots singer" with the "aching breath of a mezzo."

Kimball released her CD Oh Hear Us in 2006. One critic wrote "her songs still ripple with eccentric surprise, sudden twists, and "A-ha!" moments."

In 2007 she worked part-time as a horticulturalist and studied landscape design at Harvard. She commented: "It's a lovely way to keep the head 'free' while working outside and dreaming up songs, designs, novels." She sang and played at Boston's Lizard Lounge with musicians including guitarist Duke Levine, lap steel player Kevin Barry, drummer Bill Beard, bassist Richard Gates, and guest artists including Dennis Brennan, Kris Delmhorst, Rose Polenzani, Anne Heaton, and Rose Cousins.

Since 2009, Kimball has performed with Wintery Songs in Eleventy Part Harmony, a loose collective of Boston-area female musicians she initiated with Rose Polenzani to perform eclectic seasonal music. The group has featured core members such as Rose Cousins and Laura Cortese along with a revolving cast of collaborators that has included Catie Curtis, Sarah Jarosz and Aoife O'Donovan. The group released an eponymous EP in 2014 and a full-length album of original, traditional and modern seasonal songs, Hark, in 2015, with contributions from Kris Delmhorst and Anais Mitchell. The group continues to perform annual holiday shows each December. The Boston Globe described them as "a veritable supergroup of some of the finest local singer-songwriters."

== Personal ==
At the beginning of her career, Kimball also worked as a children's book designer for Little, Brown and she has also studied landscape design and ecology at Boston Architectural College. Kimball has performed to raise money for charitable organizations such as Massachusetts Families in Need and she supports the cause of helping women's shelters. She is a mother with one son and lives in the Boston, Massachusetts area.

== Discography ==
Jennifer Kimball
| Album | Year | Label | Notes | References |
|---|---|---|---|---|
| Grace in Gravity | 1991 | | part of The Story | |
| Angel in the House | 1993 | Elektra | part of The Story | |
| Veering from the Wave | 1998 | Philips; Imaginary Road | solo debut album | |
| Oh Hear Us | 2006 | Epoisse Records | | |
| Avocet | 2017 | Epoisse Records | | |
