= 1986 in country music =

This is a list of notable events in country music that took place in the year 1986.

== Events ==
- January 18 — "American Country Countdown" with Bob Kingsley expands from three to four hours. Several new features — including a chronological playback of songs reaching No. 1 on the Billboard Hot Country Singles chart and a calendar feature (highlighting a birthday, or anniversary of a notable song or event in country music) — are added.
- June 25 — Jenifer Strait, the 13-year-old daughter of George Strait (who by now is one of country music's top performers) is killed in a car accident in San Marcos, Texas. Her father still refuses to talk about his daughter's death to this day.
- July 19 — Columbia Records drops Johnny Cash from the label's roster after 28 years.

=== No dates ===
- For the first time in its 42-year history, there is a new No. 1 song for each week of the year, according to Billboard magazine's Hot Country Singles Chart.
- 1986 was a renaissance year in country music, with a host of "A New Traditionalist"-minded artists reinvigorating a genre that critics were saying had grown increasingly stagnant and pop-oriented. Among the most successful new artists: Holly Dunn, Judy Rodman, Ricky Van Shelton, Randy Travis and Dwight Yoakam. Keith Whitley, another artist who had been around for a few years, has his first major hit early in the year. They – along with popular newcomers from earlier in the decade such as Alabama, George Strait and Reba McEntire, and longtime artists like George Jones, Merle Haggard and Conway Twitty – proved not only that country music was the music of the people, but also that the genre had real resiliency.
- After 17 years of playing co-host to Roy Clark, Buck Owens announces his departure from the still-popular "Hee Haw." Clark would soldier on alone for the next six years, with rotating guest stars each week.

== Top hits of the year ==
=== Singles released by American artists ===
| US | CAN | Single | Artist |
|---|---|---|---|
| 1 | 1 | 100% Chance of Rain | Gary Morris |
| 6 | 5 | 1982 | Randy Travis |
| 1 | 1 | Ain't Misbehavin' | Hank Williams, Jr. |
| 6 | 1 | All Tied Up | Ronnie McDowell |
| 1 | 1 | Always Have, Always Will | Janie Fricke |
| 19 | 53 | Arlene | Marty Stuart |
| 5 | 16 | At the Sound of the Tone | John Schneider |
| 7 | 2 | (Back to The) Heartbreak Kid | Restless Heart |
| 14 | 7 | Back When Love Was Enough | Mark Gray |
| 12 | 15 | Bad Love | Pake McEntire |
| 1 | 1 | Bop | Dan Seals |
| 17 | 7 | Born Yesterday | The Everly Brothers |
| 1 | 1 | Both to Each Other (Friends and Lovers) | Eddie Rabbitt & Juice Newton |
| 10 | — | Burned Like a Rocket | Billy Joe Royal |
| 1 | 1 | Cajun Moon | Ricky Skaggs |
| 9 | 5 | Cheap Love | Juice Newton |
| 3 | 1 | Come On In (You Did the Best You Could Do) | The Oak Ridge Boys |
| 5 | 4 | Count On Me | The Statler Brothers |
| 2 | 4 | Country State of Mind | Hank Williams, Jr. |
| 1 | 1 | Cry | Crystal Gayle |
| 7 | — | Daddy's Hands | Holly Dunn |
| 1 | 1 | Desperado Love | Conway Twitty |
| 13 | 7 | The Devil's on the Loose | Waylon Jennings |
| 10 | 10 | Didn't We | Lee Greenwood |
| 1 | 1 | Diggin' Up Bones | Randy Travis |
| 1 | 1 | Don't Underestimate My Love for You | Lee Greenwood |
| 6 | 9 | Doo-Wah Days | Mickey Gilley |
| 12 | 35 | Down in Tennessee | John Anderson |
| 9 | 17 | Dreamland Express | John Denver |
| 8 | 21 | Drinkin' My Baby Goodbye | Charlie Daniels |
| 5 | 15 | Easy to Please | Janie Fricke |
| 20 | 47 | Every Night | Pake McEntire |
| 1 | 1 | Everything That Glitters (Is Not Gold) | Dan Seals |
| 4 | 2 | Fast Lanes and Country Roads | Barbara Mandrell |
| 2 | 8 | Feelin' the Feelin' | The Bellamy Brothers |
| 9 | 12 | A Friend in California | Merle Haggard |
| 17 | 19 | A Girl Like Emmylou | Southern Pacific |
| 1 | 1 | Got My Heart Set on You | John Conlee |
| 12 | — | Gotta Learn to Love Without You | Michael Johnson |
| 1 | 1 | Grandpa (Tell Me 'Bout the Good Old Days) | The Judds |
| 7 | 7 | Guitar Town | Steve Earle |
| 4 | 2 | Guitars, Cadillacs | Dwight Yoakam |
| 1 | 1 | Happy, Happy Birthday Baby | Ronnie Milsap |
| 10 | 19 | Harmony | John Conlee |
| 14 | 16 | Heart Don't Fall Now | Sawyer Brown |
| 1 | 2 | Heartbeat in the Darkness | Don Williams |
| 1 | 1 | Hearts Aren't Made to Break (They're Made to Love) | Lee Greenwood |
| 1 | 1 | Hell and High Water | T. Graham Brown |
| 5 | 6 | Hold On | Rosanne Cash |
| 3 | 1 | Home Again in My Heart | Nitty Gritty Dirt Band |
| 10 | 7 | Honky Tonk Crowd | John Anderson |
| 3 | 1 | Honky Tonk Man | Dwight Yoakam |
| 1 | 1 | Hurt | Juice Newton |
| 1 | 1 | I Could Get Used to You | Exile |
| 5 | 4 | I Had a Beautiful Time | Merle Haggard |
| 9 | 7 | I Love You by Heart | Sylvia & Michael Johnson |
| 14 | — | I Miss You Already | Billy Joe Royal |
| 7 | — | I Tell It Like It Used to Be | T. Graham Brown |
| 3 | 2 | I Wish That I Could Hurt That Way Again | T. Graham Brown |
| 10 | 7 | I've Got a New Heartache | Ricky Skaggs |
| 1 | 1 | In Love | Ronnie Milsap |
| 9 | 28 | In Over My Heart | T. G. Sheppard |
| 1 | 5 | It Ain't Cool to Be Crazy About You | George Strait |
| 1 | 1 | It'll Be Me | Exile |
| 7 | 7 | It's Just a Matter of Time | Glen Campbell |
| 15 | 16 | Juliet | The Oak Ridge Boys |
| 1 | 1 | Just Another Love | Tanya Tucker |
| 1 | 2 | Just in Case | The Forester Sisters |
| 1 | 2 | Life's Highway | Steve Wariner |
| 1 | 2 | Little Rock | Reba McEntire |
| 1 | 1 | Living in the Promiseland | Willie Nelson |
| 2 | 3 | Lonely Alone | The Forester Sisters |
| 3 | — | Love at the Five and Dime | Kathy Mattea |
| 14 | — | Love Will Get You Through Times of No Money | Girls Next Door |
| 4 | 1 | Love's Gonna Get You Someday | Ricky Skaggs |
| 1 | 1 | Makin' Up for Lost Time (The Dallas Lovers' Song) | Crystal Gayle and Gary Morris |
| 1 | 1 | Mama's Never Seen Those Eyes | The Forester Sisters |
| 5 | 2 | Memories to Burn | Gene Watson |
| 14 | 38 | Miami, My Amy | Keith Whitley |
| 1 | 1 | Mind Your Own Business | Hank Williams, Jr. |
| 1 | 1 | Morning Desire | Kenny Rogers |
| 1 | 2 | Never Be You | Rosanne Cash |
| 4 | 11 | Nights | Ed Bruce |
| 6 | 5 | No One Mends a Broken Heart Like You | Barbara Mandrell |
| 1 | 1 | Nobody in His Right Mind Would've Left Her | George Strait |
| 12 | 9 | Nothing but Your Love Matters | Larry Gatlin & the Gatlin Brothers |
| 10 | 6 | Oh Darlin' (Why Don't You Care for Me No More) | The O'Kanes |
| 9 | 27 | Oklahoma Borderline | Vince Gill |
| 5 | 3 | Old Flame | Juice Newton |
| 5 | 6 | Old School | John Conlee |
| 1 | 1 | On the Other Hand | Randy Travis |
| 1 | 1 | Once in a Blue Moon | Earl Thomas Conley |
| 3 | 2 | The One I Loved Back Then (The Corvette Song) | George Jones |
| 3 | 1 | One Love at a Time | Tanya Tucker |
| 11 | 4 | Out Goin' Cattin' | Sawyer Brown with Cat Joe Bonsall |
| 6 | 3 | Partners, Brothers and Friends | Nitty Gritty Dirt Band |
| 18 | 24 | Perfect Stranger | Southern Pacific |
| 7 | 3 | Please Be Love | Mark Gray |
| 4 | 5 | Read My Lips | Marie Osmond |
| 9 | 19 | Reno Bound | Southern Pacific |
| 4 | 5 | Repetitive Regret | Eddie Rabbitt |
| 1 | 1 | Rockin' with the Rhythm of the Rain | The Judds |
| 15 | 14 | Rollin' Nowhere | Michael Martin Murphey |
| 3 | 4 | Savin' My Love for You | Pake McEntire |
| 5 | 4 | Second to No One | Rosanne Cash |
| 15 | 7 | Shakin' | Sawyer Brown |
| 1 | 1 | She and I | Alabama |
| 2 | 3 | She Used to Be Somebody's Baby | Larry Gatlin & the Gatlin Brothers |
| 22 | 18 | Shoe String | Mel McDaniel |
| 7 | 15 | Since I Found You | Sweethearts of the Rodeo |
| 8 | — | Slow Boat to China | Girls Next Door |
| 9 | 20 | Somebody Wants Me Out of the Way | George Jones |
| 3 | 2 | Sometimes a Lady | Eddy Raven |
| 5 | 3 | Stand a Little Rain | Nitty Gritty Dirt Band |
| 12 | 5 | Stand on It | Mel McDaniel |
| 4 | 11 | Starting Over Again | Steve Wariner |
| 1 | 1 | Strong Heart | T. G. Sheppard |
| 14 | 21 | Super Love | Exile |
| 8 | 34 | Sweeter and Sweeter | The Statler Brothers |
| 9 | 16 | Ten Feet Away | Keith Whitley |
| 1 | 2 | That Rock Won't Roll | Restless Heart |
| 9 | 9 | That's How You Know When Love's Right | Nicolette Larson (with Steve Wariner) |
| 1 | 1 | There's No Stopping Your Heart | Marie Osmond |
| 1 | 1 | Think About Love | Dolly Parton |
| 17 | 20 | Tie Our Love (In a Double Knot) | Dolly Parton |
| 10 | 11 | Til I Loved You | Restless Heart |
| 1 | 1 | Tomb of the Unknown Love | Kenny Rogers |
| 2 | 3 | Too Many Times | Earl Thomas Conley & Anita Pointer |
| 1 | 1 | Too Much Is Not Enough | The Bellamy Brothers with The Forester Sisters |
| 1 | 1 | Touch Me When We're Dancing | Alabama |
| 1 | — | Until I Met You | Judy Rodman |
| 10 | — | Walk the Way the Wind Blows | Kathy Mattea |
| 3 | 2 | We've Got a Good Fire Goin' | Don Williams |
| 8 | 7 | What You'll Do When I'm Gone | Waylon Jennings |
| 1 | 1 | What's a Memory Like You (Doing in a Love Like This) | John Schneider |
| 17 | 27 | When It's Down to Me and You | Charly McClain (with Wayne Massey) |
| 20 | 33 | When You Get to the Heart | Barbara Mandrell (with The Oak Ridge Boys) |
| 1 | 3 | Whoever's in New England | Reba McEntire |
| 5 | 5 | Will the Wolf Survive | Waylon Jennings |
| 10 | 13 | Wine Colored Roses | George Jones |
| 16 | 19 | Working Class Man | Lacy J. Dalton |
| 7 | 5 | Working Without a Net | Waylon Jennings |
| 10 | 8 | You Are My Music, You Are My Song | Charly McClain (with Wayne Massey) |
| 1 | 1 | You Can Dream of Me | Steve Wariner |
| 9 | — | You Can't Stop Love | Schuyler, Knobloch & Overstreet |
| 24 | 20 | You Made a Rock of a Rolling Stone | The Oak Ridge Boys |
| 3 | 3 | You Should Have Been Gone by Now | Eddy Raven |
| 4 | 4 | You're Something Special to Me | George Strait |
| 1 | 1 | You're Still New to Me | Marie Osmond with Paul Davis |
| 1 | 1 | You're the Last Thing I Needed Tonight | John Schneider |
| 5 | 2 | Your Memory Ain't What It Used to Be | Mickey Gilley |

=== Singles released by Canadian artists ===
| US | CAN | Single | Artist |
|---|---|---|---|
| 91 | 9 | Being a Fool Again | Audie Henry |
| — | 15 | Call Me Up | Rae Palmer |
| — | 16 | Fiddlin' Man | Whiskey Jack |
| — | 13 | Forget About Me | Anne Lord |
| — | 4 | He's My Gentle Man | Audie Henry |
| — | 10 | Heads You Win (Tails I Lose) | Anita Perras |
| — | 8 | Hot on the Heels of Love | The Haggertys |
| — | 6 | I'll Never Get Over You | Anne Lord |
| — | 13 | I'm Best at Lovin' You | Murray McLauchlan |
| — | 9 | I'm Taking Care of Myself | Carroll Baker |
| — | 5 | In My Arms Tonight | Bootleg |
| — | 9 | It's Times Like This | Carol Martyn |
| — | 18 | Love Crazy | Gilles Godard |
| — | 6 | Love Sweet Love | Terry Carisse |
| — | 16 | Lovin' the Night Away | Terry Sumsion |
| 1 | 1 | Now and Forever (You and Me) | Anne Murray |
| — | 8 | Pretty Diamond Ring | Mercey Brothers |
| — | 9 | Reach Out and Touch Her | Harvey Henry |
| — | 14 | Rise Against the Wind | Dick Damron with Ginny Mitchell |
| — | 19 | Something Good | Anita Perras with Tim Taylor |
| — | 14 | Stealer of Hearts | Ronnie Prophet |
| — | 17 | Summer Nights | The Ellis Family Band |
| — | 6 | Take a Little Chance on Love | Mercey Brothers |
| — | 15 | Two Hearts in a Lonely Mind | Jules |
| 80 | 8 | What If It's Right | Family Brown |
| — | 18 | You Can't Hide from Love | Stoker Bros |

== Top new album releases ==
| US | Album | Artist | Record label |
|---|---|---|---|
| 1 | #7 | George Strait | MCA |
| 1 | Black & White | Janie Frickie | Columbia |
| 22 | Born Yesterday | The Everly Brothers | Mercury/PolyGram |
| 15 | Class of '55 | Carl Perkins, Jerry Lee Lewis, Roy Orbison & Johnny Cash | America/Smash |
| 17 | Countrified | John Anderson | Warner Bros. |
| 7 | Four for the Show | The Statler Brothers | Mercury/PolyGram |
| 2 | A Friend in California | Merle Haggard | Epic |
| 16 | From the Pages of My Mind | Ray Charles | Columbia |
| 20 | Girls Like Me | Tanya Tucker | Capitol |
| 1 | Greatest Hits | Alabama | RCA |
| 2 | Greatest Hits | Exile | Epic |
| 1 | Guitar Town | Steve Earle | MCA |
| 1 | Guitars, Cadillacs, Etc., Etc. | Dwight Yoakam | Reprise |
| 9 | Harmony | John Conlee | Columbia |
| 13 | Heroes | Johnny Cash & Waylon Jennings | Columbia |
| 19 | I Only Wanted You | Marie Osmond | Capitol/Curb |
| 15 | I Tell It Like It Used to Be | T. Graham Brown | Capitol |
| 23 | Judy | Judy Rodman | MTM |
| 25 | Just Can't Sit Down Music | Mel McDaniel | Capitol |
| 21 | Looking Ahead | Billy Joe Royal | Atlantic America |
| 9 | Love Will Find Its Way to You | Lee Greenwood | MCA |
| 3 | Love's Gonna Get Ya! | Ricky Skaggs | Epic |
| 14 | Lyle Lovett | Lyle Lovett | Curb/MCA |
| 17 | Merry Christmas Strait to You | George Strait | MCA |
| 1 | Montana Cafe | Hank Williams, Jr. | Curb/Warner Bros. |
| 9 | The O'Kanes | The O'Kanes | Columbia |
| 12 | On the Front Line | Dan Seals | Capitol |
| 15 | Out Among the Stars | Merle Haggard | Epic |
| 8 | Out Goin' Cattin' | Sawyer Brown | Capitol/Curb |
| 13 | Partners | Larry Gatlin and the Gatlin Brothers | Columbia |
| 13 | Partners | Willie Nelson | Columbia |
| 9 | Plain Brown Wrapper | Gary Morris | Warner Bros. |
| 1 | The Promiseland | Willie Nelson | Columbia |
| 6 | Rabbitt Trax | Eddie Rabbitt | RCA |
| 8 | Seasons | The Oak Ridge Boys | MCA |
| 2 | Something to Talk About | Anne Murray | Capitol |
| 1 | Storms of Life | Randy Travis | Warner Bros. |
| 12 | Straight to the Heart | Crystal Gayle | Warner Bros. |
| 11 | Surely You Joust | Ray Stevens | MCA |
| 8 | Sweethearts of the Rodeo | Sweethearts of the Rodeo | Columbia |
| 17 | Take the Long Way Home | John Schneider | MCA |
| 16 | They Don't Make Them; Like They Used To | Kenny Rogers | RCA |
| 9 | Thirteen | Emmylou Harris | Warner Bros. |
| 3 | Too Many Times | Earl Thomas Conley | RCA |
| 1 | The Touch | Alabama | RCA |
| 10 | Twenty Years of Dirt | Nitty Gritty Dirt Band | Warner Bros. |
| 13 | Walk the Way the Wind Blows | Kathy Mattea | Mercury |
| 1 | What Am I Gonna Do About You | Reba McEntire | MCA |
| 1 | Wheels | Restless Heart | RCA |
| 1 | Whoever's in New England | Reba McEntire | MCA |
| 1 | Will the Wolf Survive | Waylon Jennings | MCA |
| 5 | Wine Colored Roses | George Jones | Epic |

=== Other top albums ===
| US | Album | Artist | Record label |
|---|---|---|---|
| 34 | All Tied Up in Love | Ronnie McDowell | MCA |
| 53 | American Vagabond | William Lee Golden | MCA |
| 59 | The Boys Are Back in Town | The Maines Brothers Band | Mercury/PolyGram |
| 65 | Chance | Chance | Mercury/PolyGram |
| 50 | Christmas Again | The Oak Ridge Boys | MCA |
| 65 | Christmas with Ronnie Milsap | Ronnie Milsap | RCA |
| 49 | Everybody Knows I'm Yours | Jim Glaser | MCA/Noble Vision |
| 37 | Fallin' for You for Years | Conway Twitty | Warner Bros. |
| 47 | Fire at First Sight | The Kendalls | MCA |
| 29 | Floridays | Jimmy Buffett | MCA |
| 30 | The Girls Next Door | Girls Next Door | MTM |
| 48 | Greatest Hits | Vern Gosdin | Compleat |
| 27 | Greatest Hits Volume Two | The Bellamy Brothers | Curb/MCA |
| 32 | Highway Diner | Lacy J. Dalton | Columbia |
| 29 | Holly Dunn | Holly Dunn | MTM |
| 26 | It Still Rains in Memphis | T. G. Sheppard | Columbia |
| 35 | Killbilly Hill | Southern Pacific | Warner Bros. |
| 26 | L.A. to Miami | Keith Whitley | RCA |
| 34 | Marty Stuart | Marty Stuart | Columbia |
| 62 | Memphis Sessions | Rick Nelson | Epic |
| 53 | Moments | Barbara Mandrell | MCA |
| 66 | New Grass Revival | New Grass Revival | Capitol |
| 29 | New Moves | Don Williams | Capitol |
| 53 | Night Things | Ed Bruce | RCA |
| 40 | One and Only | Mickey Gilley | Epic |
| 35 | Patty Loveless | Patty Loveless | MCA |
| 27 | Perfume, Ribbons & Pearls | The Forester Sisters | Warner Bros. |
| 56 | Portrait of a Singer | Ray Price | Step One |
| 31 | Radio Gospel Favorites | The Statler Brothers | Mercury/PolyGram |
| 40 | Reba Nell McEntire | Reba McEntire | Mercury/PolyGram |
| 31 | Repossessed | Kris Kristofferson | Mercury/PolyGram |
| 57 | Robin Lee | Robin Lee | Evergreen |
| 40 | Rose of My Heart | Nicolette Larson | MCA |
| 39 | Schuyler, Knobloch & Overstreet | S-K-O | MTM |
| 70 | The Shoppe | The Shoppe | MTM |
| 31 | Son of the South | David Allan Coe | Columbia |
| 49 | Starting New Memories | Gene Watson | Epic |
| 38 | Street Language | Rodney Crowell | Columbia |
| 59 | Thank God for the Radio... And All the Hits | The Kendalls | Mercury/PolyGram |
| 35 | That Feeling Inside | Mark Gray | Columbia |
| 54 | Think About Love | Dolly Parton | RCA |
| 46 | Tonight We Ride | Michael Martin Murphey | Warner Bros. |
| 52 | Too Old to Grow Up | Pake McEntire | RCA |
| 28 | When Love Is Right | Charly McClain & Wayne Massey | Epic |
| 26 | Wings | Michael Johnson | RCA |
| 50 | Winners | Donna Fargo | Mercury/PolyGram |

== On television ==
=== Regular series ===
- Hee Haw (1969–1993, syndicated)

== Births ==
- February 2 — Blaine Larsen, 2000's (decade) singer better known for his single "How Do You Get That Lonely".
- March 23 — Brett Eldredge, singer of the 2010s best known for hits including "Don't Ya" and "Beat of the Music".
- April 1 — Hillary Scott, member of Lady Antebellum and daughter of Linda Davis.
- April 2 — Chris Janson, singer-songwriter known for his 2015 hit "Buy Me a Boat".
- June 18 — Jimmie Allen, singer-songwriter known for his late 2010s hits "Best Shot" and "Make Me Want To".
- June 28 — Kellie Pickler, sixth-place finalist on the fifth season of American Idol.
- August 16 — Ashton Shepherd, debuted in late 2007-early 2008 with her top 20 single "Takin' Off This Pain".
- September 10 — Ashley Monroe, singer-songwriter of the 2000s and 2010s and member of the Pistol Annies.
- September 19 — Chase Rice, singer of the 2010s best known for the hit "Ready Set Roll."

== Deaths ==
- February 10 — Arthur E. Satherley, 96, music executive.
- May 30 — "Papa Joe" Brown, 60, founding member of Canadian country group Family Brown.
- June 20 — Whitey Ford, 85, beloved Grand Ole Opry comedian and storyteller.
- June 25 — Jenifer Strait, 13, daughter of George Strait (car accident).
- June 27 — Joe Maphis, 65, prolific guitarist and fiddler, prominently featured on the theme to "Bonanza" (cancer).
- December 5 — Carmol Taylor, 53, songwriter.

== Hall of Fame inductees ==
=== Country Music Hall of Fame inductees ===
- Duke of Paducah (1901–1986)
- Wesley Rose (1918–1990)

=== Canadian Country Music Hall of Fame inductees ===
- Papa Joe Brown

== Major awards ==
=== Grammy Awards ===
- Best Female Country Vocal Performance — "Whoever's in New England", Reba McEntire
- Best Male Country Vocal Performance — "Lost in the Fifties Tonight", Ronnie Milsap
- Best Country Performance by a Duo or Group with Vocal — "Grandpa (Tell Me 'Bout the Good Ol' Days)". The Judds
- Best Country Instrumental Performance — "Raisin' the Dickins", Ricky Skaggs
- Best Country Song — "Grandpa (Tell Me 'Bout the Good Old Days)", Jamie O'Hara (Performer: The Judds)

=== Juno Awards ===
- Country Male Vocalist of the Year — Murray McLauchlan
- Country Female Vocalist of the Year — Anne Murray
- Country Group or Duo of the Year — Prairie Oyster

=== Academy of Country Music ===
- Entertainer of the Year — Hank Williams, Jr.
- Song of the Year — "On the Other Hand", Paul Overstreet and Don Schlitz (Performer: Randy Travis)
- Single of the Year — "On the Other Hand", Randy Travis
- Album of the Year — Storms of Life, Randy Travis
- Top Male Vocalist — Randy Travis
- Top Female Vocalist — Reba McEntire
- Top Vocal Duo — The Judds
- Top Vocal Group — The Forester Sisters
- Top New Male Vocalist — Dwight Yoakam
- Top New Female Vocalist — Holly Dunn
- Video of the Year — "Whoever's in New England", Reba McEntire (Directors: Jeff Schock and Jon Small)

=== Canadian Country Music Association ===
- Entertainer(s) of the Year — Family Brown
- Male Artist of the Year — Terry Carisse
- Female Artist of the Year — Anita Perras
- Group of the Year — Family Brown
- SOCAN Song of the Year — "Now and Forever", David Foster, Jim Vallance, Charles Randolph Goodrum (Performer: Anne Murray)
- Single of the Year — "Now and Forever," Anne Murray
- Album of the Year — Feel the Fire, Family Brown
- Top Selling Album — Hymns of Gold, Carroll Baker
- Vista Rising Star Award — J. K. Gulley
- Duo of the Year — Anita Perras and Tim Taylor

=== Country Music Association ===
- Entertainer of the Year — Reba McEntire
- Song of the Year — "On the Other Hand", Paul Overstreet and Don Schlitz (Performer: Randy Travis)
- Single of the Year — "Bop", Dan Seals
- Album of the Year — Lost in the Fifties Tonight, Ronnie Milsap
- Male Vocalist of the Year — George Strait
- Female Vocalist of the Year — Reba McEntire
- Vocal Duo of the Year — Marie Osmond and Dan Seals
- Vocal Group of the Year — The Judds
- Horizon Award — Randy Travis
- Music Video of the Year — "Who's Gonna Fill Their Shoes?", George Jones (Director: Marc Ball)
- Instrumentalist of the Year — Johnny Gimble
- Instrumental Group of the Year — The Oak Ridge Boys

=== Hollywood Walk of Fame ===
Country stars who got a star in 1986

the Everly Brothers

== Other links ==
- Country Music Association
- Inductees of the Country Music Hall of Fame
