= List of RPM number-one country singles of 1986 =

These are the Canadian number-one country songs of 1986, per the RPM Country Tracks chart.

Issue date	Title	Artist
January 18	Morning Desire	Kenny Rogers
January 25	Bop	Dan Seals
February 1	Home Again in My Heart	Nitty Gritty Dirt Band
February 8	Makin' Up for Lost Time (The Dallas Lovers' Song)	Gary Morris with Crystal Gayle
February 15	Hurt	Juice Newton
February 22	Come On In (You Did the Best You Could Do)	The Oak Ridge Boys
March 1	You Can Dream of Me	Steve Wariner
March 8	There's No Stopping Your Heart	Marie Osmond
March 15	Think About Love	Dolly Parton
March 22	I Could Get Used to You	Exile
March 29	What's a Memory Like You (Doing in a Love Like This)	John Schneider
April 5	100% Chance of Rain	Gary Morris
April 12	Don't Underestimate My Love for You	Lee Greenwood
April 19	She and I	Alabama
April 26	Cajun Moon	Ricky Skaggs
May 3	Now and Forever (You and Me)	Anne Murray
May 10	Now and Forever (You and Me)	Anne Murray
May 17	Once in a Blue Moon	Earl Thomas Conley
May 24	Grandpa (Tell Me 'Bout the Good Ol' Days)	The Judds
May 31	Ain't Misbehavin'	Hank Williams, Jr.
June 7	Tomb of the Unknown Love	Kenny Rogers
June 14	Happy, Happy Birthday Baby	Ronnie Milsap
June 21	One Love at a Time	Tanya Tucker
June 28	Honky Tonk Man	Dwight Yoakam
July 5	Mama's Never Seen Those Eyes	The Forester Sisters
July 12	Living in the Promiseland	Willie Nelson
July 19	Everything That Glitters (Is Not Gold)	Dan Seals
July 26	Hearts Aren't Made to Break (They're Made to Love)	Lee Greenwood
August 2	On the Other Hand	Randy Travis
August 9	All Tied Up	Ronnie McDowell
August 16	Nobody in His Right Mind Would've Left Her	George Strait
August 23	Rockin' with the Rhythm of the Rain	The Judds
August 30	Strong Heart	T. G. Sheppard
September 6	You're the Last Thing I Needed Tonight	John Schneider
September 13	Desperado Love	Conway Twitty
September 20	Got My Heart Set on You	John Conlee
September 27	In Love	Ronnie Milsap
October 4	In Love	Ronnie Milsap
October 11	Always Have, Always Will	Janie Fricke
October 18	Both to Each Other (Friends and Lovers)	Eddie Rabbitt with Juice Newton
October 25	Both to Each Other (Friends and Lovers)	Eddie Rabbitt with Juice Newton
November 1	Just Another Love	Tanya Tucker
November 8	Cry	Crystal Gayle
November 15	It'll Be Me	Exile
November 22	Diggin' Up Bones	Randy Travis
November 29	You're Still New to Me	Paul Davis with Marie Osmond
December 6	Hell and High Water	T. Graham Brown
December 13	Touch Me When We're Dancing	Alabama
December 20	Too Much Is Not Enough	The Bellamy Brothers with The Forester Sisters
December 27	Love's Gonna Get You Someday	Ricky Skaggs

== See also ==
- 1986 in music
- List of number-one country singles of 1986 (U.S.)
