= List of Hot Country Singles number ones of 1986 =

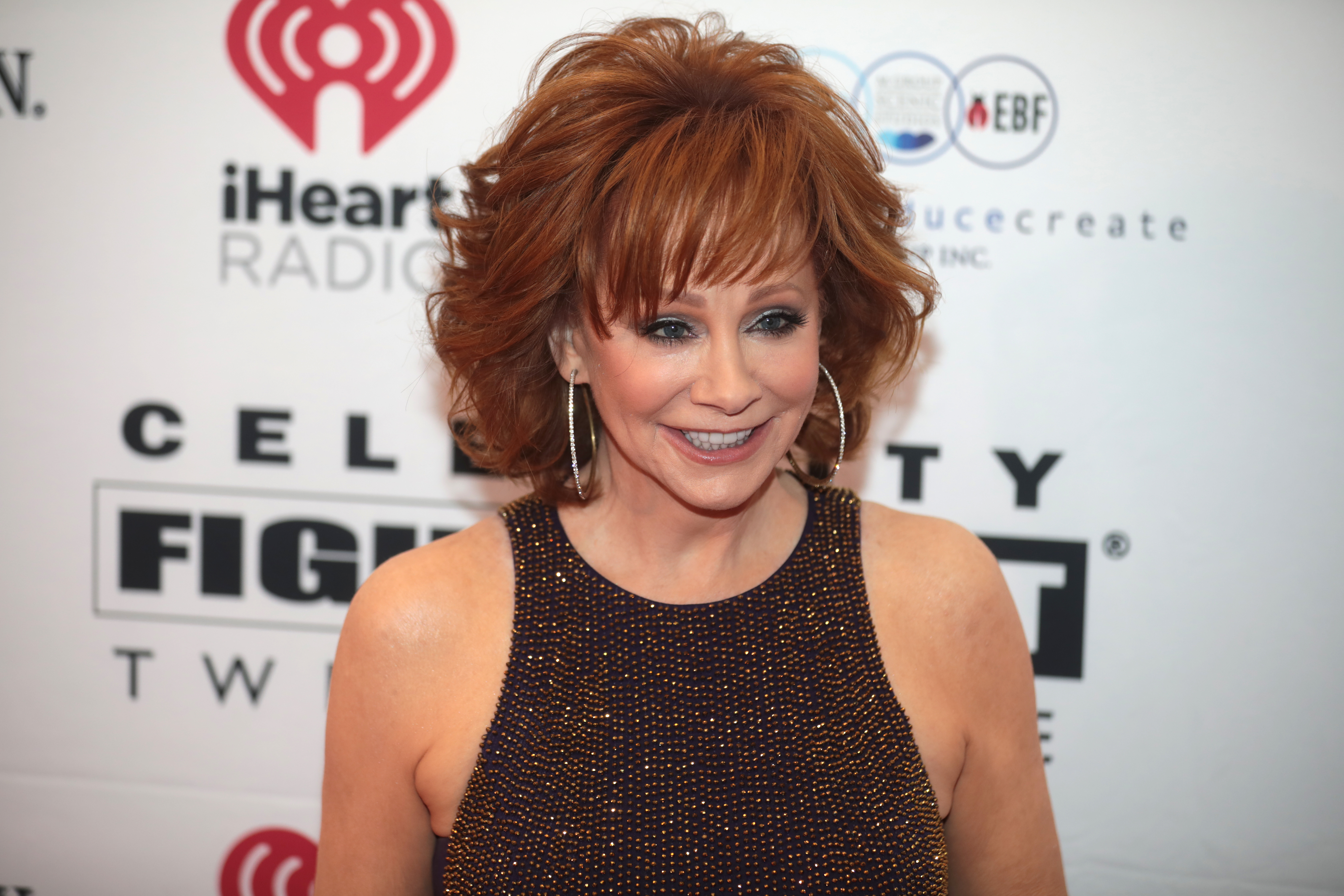
Reba McEntire was one of a large number of acts with two number one singles in 1986. She also performed on the year-end number one by Hank Williams Jr. but was not credited on the chart

Hot Country Songs is a chart that ranks the top-performing country music songs in the United States, published by Billboard magazine. In 1986, 52 different songs topped the chart, then published under the title Hot Country Singles, based on playlists submitted by country music radio stations and sales reports submitted by stores. No song managed more than a single week at number one during the year.

The first number one of the year was "Have Mercy" by mother-daughter duo the Judds. In the fall, Conway Twitty achieved his 40th and final Hot Country number one with "Desperado Love", 18 years after he first topped the chart with "Next in Line". Twitty's total of 40 number ones would remain a record for the highest number of country chart-toppers by an artist until 2006, when the record was broken by George Strait. Two female acts tied for the most number ones of the year, each reaching the top spot three times: the Forester Sisters (including one in collaboration with the Bellamy Brothers) and the Judds. More than a dozen acts each achieved two number ones, including Crystal Gayle and Gary Morris, who each achieved one solo number one as well as performing together on the hit "Makin' Up for Lost Time (The Dallas Lovers' Song)". One of Juice Newton's two number ones, "Both to Each Other (Friends and Lovers)", a duet with Eddie Rabbitt, had originally been performed by Gloria Loring and Carl Anderson on the soap opera Days of Our Lives the previous year. The song was not initially released commercially, but after Newton and Rabbitt's version became a hit, Loring and Anderson's recording was released and topped the Hot Adult Contemporary chart, meaning that versions of the same song by two different acts were number ones in their respective genres within a month of each other.

Acts to top the country chart for the first time in 1986 included Randy Travis with "On the Other Hand". Upon its initial release, the song had failed to even break into the top 40, but after Travis reached the top 10 with the song "1982", "On the Other Hand" was re-released and this time went all the way to number one, giving Travis his first chart-topper. Later in the year, T. Graham Brown achieved his first number one with "Hell and High Water", and the band Restless Heart reached the top of the chart for the first time with "That Rock Won't Roll", one of four chart-topping singles to be taken from the album Wheels. Hank Williams Jr. ended the year in the top spot with his version of "Mind Your Own Business", a song originally recorded by his father Hank Williams in 1949. The new recording featured vocal contributions from country singers Reba McEntire and Willie Nelson, rocker Tom Petty and Reverend Ike, a televangelist.

== Chart history ==
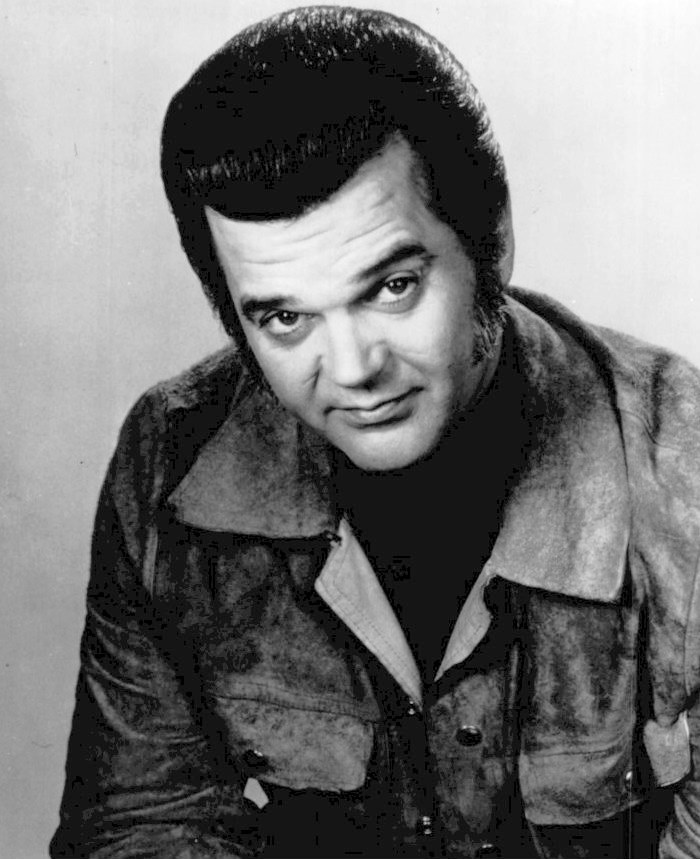
Conway Twitty had his final number one in 1986. At the time, he held the record for the highest number of chart-toppers by a single artist.

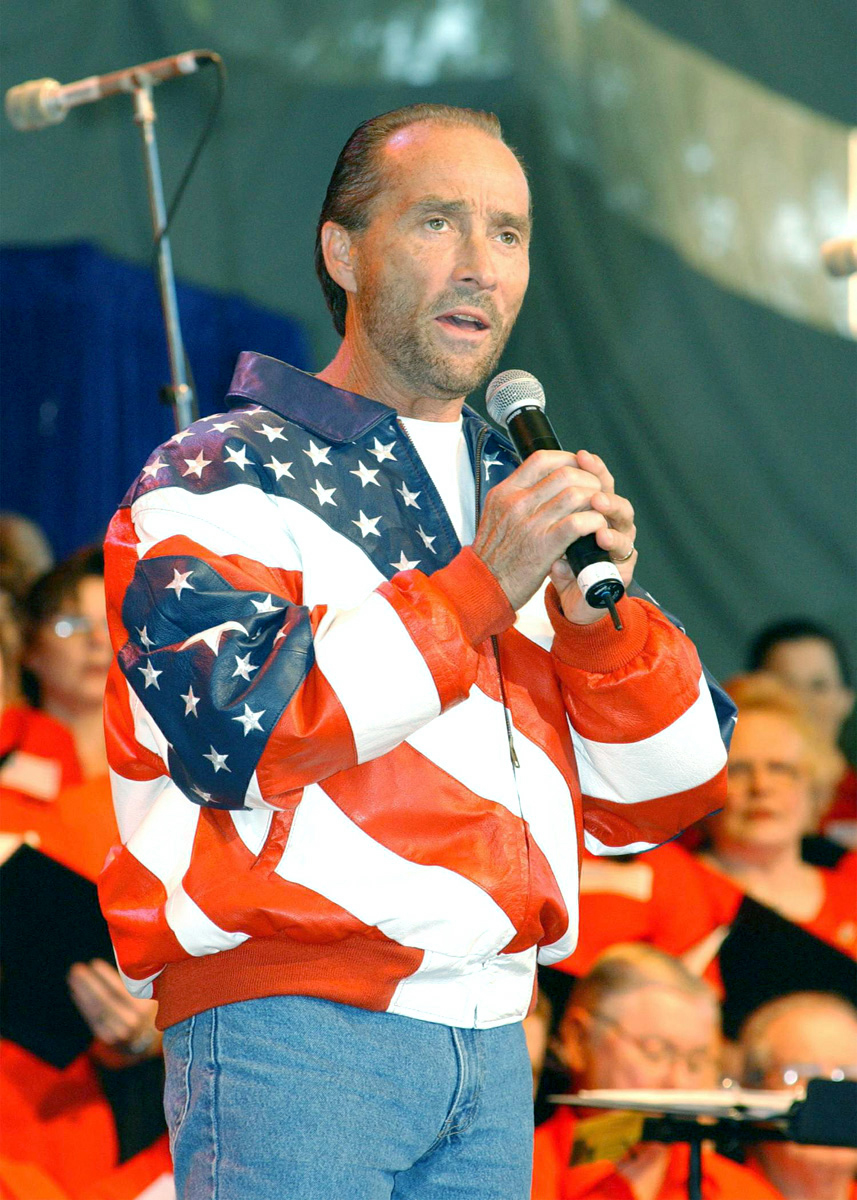
Lee Greenwood made two appearances at number one.

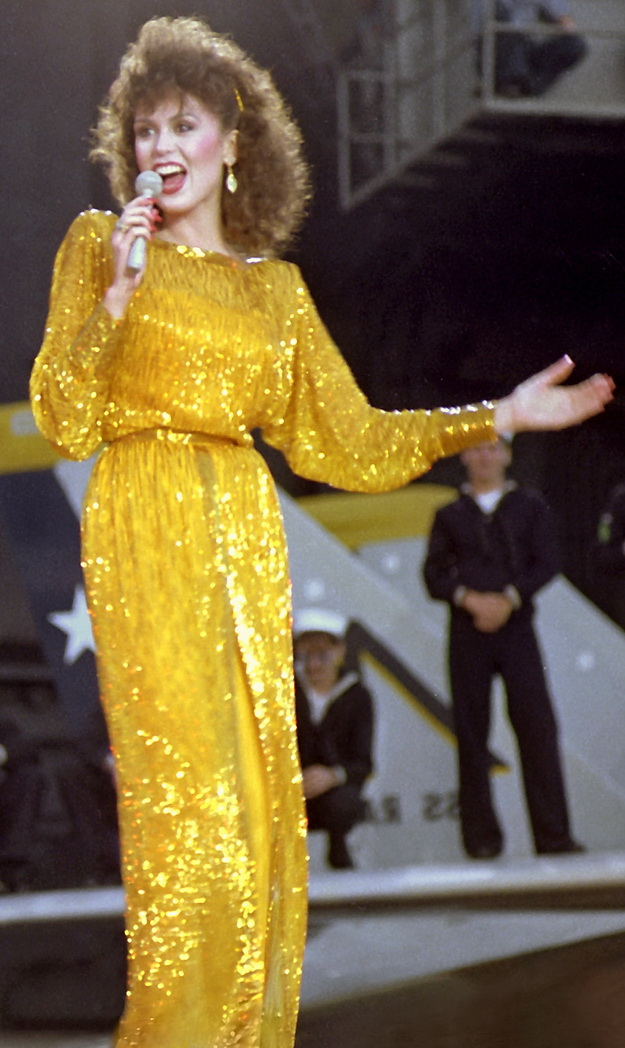
Marie Osmond was another artist with two chart-toppers in 1986.

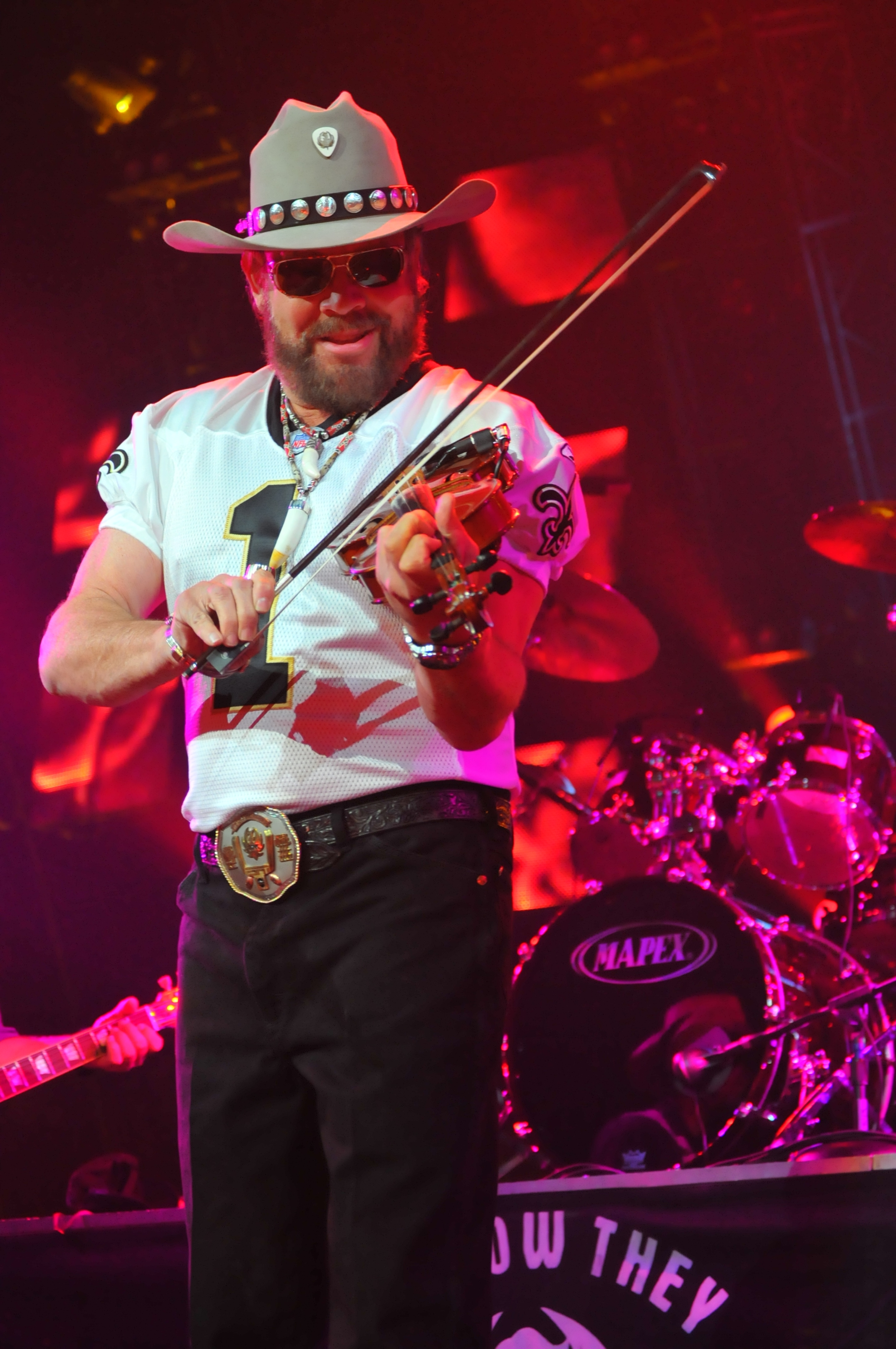
Hank Williams Jr. finished the year at number one.

Issue date	Title	Artist(s)	Ref.
January 4	"Have Mercy"	The Judds	
January 11	"Morning Desire"	Kenny Rogers	
January 18	"Bop"	Dan Seals	
January 25	"Never Be You"	Rosanne Cash	
February 1	"Just in Case"	The Forester Sisters	
February 8	"Hurt"	Juice Newton	
February 15	"Makin' Up for Lost Time (The Dallas Lovers' Song)"	Crystal Gayle and Gary Morris	
February 22	"There's No Stopping Your Heart"	Marie Osmond	
March 1	"You Can Dream of Me"	Steve Wariner	
March 8	"Think About Love"	Dolly Parton	
March 15	"I Could Get Used to You"	Exile	
March 22	"What's a Memory Like You (Doing in a Love Like This)"	John Schneider	
March 29	"Don't Underestimate My Love for You"	Lee Greenwood	
April 5	"100% Chance of Rain"	Gary Morris	
April 12	"She and I"	Alabama	
April 19	"Cajun Moon"	Ricky Skaggs	
April 26	"Now and Forever (You and Me)"	Anne Murray	
May 3	"Once in a Blue Moon"	Earl Thomas Conley	
May 10	"Grandpa (Tell Me 'Bout the Good Ol' Days)"	The Judds	
May 17	"Ain't Misbehavin'"	Hank Williams Jr.	
May 24	"Tomb of the Unknown Love"	Kenny Rogers	
May 31	"Whoever's in New England"	Reba McEntire	
June 7	"Happy, Happy Birthday Baby"	Ronnie Milsap	
June 14	"Life's Highway"	Steve Wariner	
June 21	"Mama's Never Seen Those Eyes"	The Forester Sisters	
June 28	"Living in the Promiseland"	Willie Nelson	
July 5	"Everything That Glitters (Is Not Gold)"	Dan Seals	
July 12	"Hearts Aren't Made to Break (They're Made to Love)"	Lee Greenwood	
July 19	"Until I Met You"	Judy Rodman	
July 26	"On the Other Hand"	Randy Travis	
August 2	"Nobody in His Right Mind Would've Left Her"	George Strait	
August 9	"Rockin' with the Rhythm of the Rain"	The Judds	
August 16	"You're the Last Thing I Needed Tonight"	John Schneider	
August 23	"Strong Heart"	T. G. Sheppard	
August 30	"Heartbeat in the Darkness"	Don Williams	
September 6	"Desperado Love"	Conway Twitty	
September 13	"Little Rock"	Reba McEntire	
September 20	"Got My Heart Set on You"	John Conlee	
September 27	"In Love"	Ronnie Milsap	
October 4	"Always Have, Always Will"	Janie Fricke	
October 11	"Both to Each Other (Friends and Lovers)"	Eddie Rabbitt & Juice Newton	
October 18	"Just Another Love"	Tanya Tucker	
October 25	"Cry"	Crystal Gayle	
November 1	"It'll Be Me"	Exile	
November 8	"Diggin' Up Bones"	Randy Travis	
November 15	"That Rock Won't Roll"	Restless Heart	
November 22	"You're Still New to Me"	Marie Osmond with Paul Davis	
November 29	"Touch Me When We're Dancing"	Alabama	
December 6	"It Ain't Cool to Be Crazy About You"	George Strait	
December 13	"Hell and High Water"	T. Graham Brown	
December 20	"Too Much Is Not Enough"	The Bellamy Brothers with The Forester Sisters	
December 27	"Mind Your Own Business"	Hank Williams Jr.	

== See also ==
- 1986 in music
- List of artists who reached number one on the U.S. country chart
