= 1987 Country Music Association Awards =

Annual US music awards ceremony

- Date: October 12, 1987
- Location: Grand Ole Opry House, Nashville, Tennessee
- Hosted by: Kenny Rogers
- Most wins: Randy Travis (3)
- Most nominations: Randy Travis (5)

Television/radio coverage
- Network: CBS

The 1987 Country Music Association Awards, 21st Ceremony, was held on October 12, 1987, at the Grand Ole Opry House, Nashville, Tennessee, and was hosted by CMA Award winner Kenny Rogers.

== Winners and nominees ==
Winner are in Bold.

Entertainer of the Year	Album of the Year
**Hank Williams, Jr.**; The Judds; Reba McEntire; George Strait; Randy Travis	**Always and Forever — Randy Travis**; Ocean Front Property — George Strait; Trio — Dolly Parton, Emmylou Harris, Linda Ronstadt; What Am I Going to Do About You — Reba McEntire; Wine Colored Roses — George Jones
Male Vocalist of the Year	Female Vocalist of the Year
**Randy Travis**; George Jones; Ricky Skaggs; George Strait; Hank Williams, Jr.	**Reba McEntire**; Rosanne Cash; Emmylou Harris; Kathy Mattea; Dolly Parton
Vocal Group of the Year	Vocal Duo of the Year
**The Judds**; Alabama; Asleep At The Wheel; Exile; Restless Heart	**Ricky Skaggs and Sharon White**; Dan Seals and Marie Osmond; Earl Thomas Conley and Anita Pointer; Gary Morris and Crystal Gayle; Michael Martin Murphey and Holly Dunn
Single of the Year	Song of the Year
**"Forever and Ever, Amen" — Randy Travis**; "All My Ex's Live In Texas" — George Strait; "Can't Stop My Heart From Loving You" — The O'Kanes; "The Right Left Hand" — George Jones; "Walk The Way The Wind Blows" — Kathy Mattea	**"Forever And Ever, Amen" — Paul Overstreet and Don Schlitz**; "All My Ex's Live In Texas" — Lydia Shafer and Sanger D. Shafer; "Can't Stop My Heart From Loving You" — Kieran Kane and Jamie O'Hara; "Daddy's Hands" — Holly Dunn; "On The Other Hand' — Don Schlitz and Paul Overstreet
Horizon Award	Musician of the Year
**Holly Dunn**; T. Graham Brown; The O'Kanes; Restless Heart; Sweethearts of the Rodeo	**Johnny Gimble**; Jerry Douglas; Mark O'Connor
Music Video of the Year
**My Name Is Bocephus — Hank Williams, Jr.**; A Long Line Of Love — Michael Martin Murphey; Forever and Ever, Amen — Randy Travis; Oh Darlin — The O'Kanes; What Am I Gonna Do About You — Reba McEntire

== Hall of Fame ==
Country Music Hall of Fame Inductees
- Rod Brasfield
