= Blue Love =

Blue Love may refer to:

- Blue Love (album), a 2003 album by Antique
- "Blue Love" (song), a 1988 song by The O'Kanes
- "Blue Love (In My Heart)", a 1956 song by Hank Williams
- "Blue Love", a song by Rufus and Chaka Khan from Street Player
