= Daddies Need to Grow Up Too =

Single by The O'Kanes

from the album The O'Kanes
- B-side: "Oh Darlin'"
- Released: June 1987
- Genre: Country
- Length: 3:11
- Label: Columbia
- Songwriter(s): Jamie O'Hara, Kieran Kane
- Producer(s): Kieran Kane, Jamie O'Hara

The O'Kanes singles chronology
"Can't Stop My Heart from Loving You" (1987)	"Daddies Need to Grow Up Too" (1987)	"Just Lovin' You" (1987)

"Daddies Need to Grow Up Too" is a song written and recorded by American country music duo The O'Kanes. It was released in June 1987 as the third single from the album The O'Kanes. The song reached number 9 on the Billboard Hot Country Singles & Tracks chart.

== Chart performance ==
Chart (1987)	Peak position
US Hot Country Songs (Billboard)	9
Canadian RPM Country Tracks	12
