= One True Love =

One True Love may refer to:

- One True Love (2000 film), an American film
- One True Love (2008 film), a Philippine film
- One True Love (TV series), a Philippine television series
- "One True Love" (song), a 1988 single by The O'Kanes
