= Hot on the Heels of Love =

Hot on the Heels of Love may refer to:

- Hot on the Heels of Love (Winchester rock band song), 1972
- "Hot on the Heels of Love", a song by Throbbing Gristle on their 20 Jazz Funk Greats album, 1976
- "Hot on the Heels of Love" (The Haggertys song), 1986
