= Gotta Have You =

Gotta Have You may refer to:

- "Gotta Have You" (Stevie Wonder song), 1991
- "Gotta Have You" (Eddie Rabbitt song), 1986
- "Gotta Have You", by Sara Evans from the album Slow Me Down

== See also ==
- "Got to Have You", by Christina Milian from her self-titled debut album
- "I've Got to Have You", by Carly Simon from Anticipation
