= Just Lovin' You =

Single by The O'Kanes

from the album The O'Kanes
- B-side: "When We're Gone, Long Gone"
- Released: October 1987
- Genre: Country
- Length: 3:15
- Label: Columbia
- Songwriter(s): Jamie O'Hara, Kieran Kane
- Producer(s): Kieran Kane, Jamie O'Hara

The O'Kanes singles chronology
"Daddies Need to Grow Up Too" (1987)	"Just Lovin' You" (1987)	"One True Love" (1988)

"Just Lovin' You" is a song written and recorded by American country music duo The O'Kanes. It was released in October 1987 as the fourth single from the album The O'Kanes. The song reached number 5 on the Billboard Hot Country Singles & Tracks chart.

== Chart performance ==
Chart (1987–1988)	Peak position
US Hot Country Songs (Billboard)	5
Canadian RPM Country Tracks	9
