= Tired of the Runnin' =

Studio album by The O'Kanes
- Released: March 1, 1988
- Recorded: 1987
- Genre: Country
- Length: 47:36
- Label: Columbia
- Producer: Jamie O'Hara

The O'Kanes chronology
The O'Kanes (1986)	Tired of the Runnin' (1988)	Imagine That (1990)

Professional ratings
Review scores
Source	Rating
Philadelphia Inquirer	4/4 stars

Tired of the Runnin' is the second studio album by American country music duo The O'Kanes. It was released in 1988 via Columbia Records. The album includes the singles "One True Love", "Blue Love" and "Rocky Road".

== Track listing ==
All tracks are written by Jamie O'Hara and Kieran Kane except "Isn't That So", written by Jesse Winchester.

No.	Title	Length
1.	"One True Love"	3:17
2.	"All Because of You"	3:44
3.	"It Could Be There"	3:17
4.	"Blue Love"	3:02
5.	"Rocky Road"	6:55
6.	"Highway 55"	5:23
7.	"Tired of the Runnin'"	3:32
8.	"In My Heart"	3:52
9.	"I'm Lonely"	2:43
10.	"Isn't That So"	4:51

== Chart performance ==
Chart (1988)	Peak position
US Top Country Albums (Billboard)	21
