= Singing Waterfall =

Single by Hank Williams
- B-side: "Blue Love (In My Heart)"
- Released: 1956
- Recorded: August 1948 – May 1949, Shreveport
- Genre: Country, Gospel
- Length: 2:14
- Label: MGM
- Songwriter(s): Hank Williams

"Singing Waterfall" is a hymn written and recorded by Hank Williams. It was released as a posthumous single by MGM Records in 1956. Williams recorded the song while living in Shreveport working the Louisiana Hayride in 1948 and 1949. It was one of his early compositions, appearing in his first self-published song folios, and was first recorded by singer Molly O'Day, who covered several of Hank's songs in 1946 and 1947.
