= One True Love (song) =

Single by The O'Kanes

from the album Tired of the Runnin'
- B-side: "If I Could Be There"
- Released: March 1988
- Genre: Country
- Length: 3:20
- Label: Columbia
- Songwriter(s): Jamie O'Hara, Kieran Kane
- Producer(s): Kieran Kane, Jamie O'Hara

The O'Kanes singles chronology
"Just Lovin' You" (1987)	"One True Love" (1988)	"Blue Love" (1988)

"One True Love" is a song written and recorded by American country music duo The O'Kanes. It was released in March 1988 as the first single from the album Tired of the Runnin'. The song reached number 4 on the Billboard Hot Country Singles & Tracks chart.

== Charts ==
=== Weekly charts ===
Chart (1988)	Peak position
US Hot Country Songs (Billboard)	4
Canadian RPM Country Tracks	5

=== Year-end charts ===
Chart (1988)	Position
US Hot Country Songs (Billboard)	73
