= Bad Love (Pake McEntire song) =

Single by Pake McEntire

from the album Too Old to Grow Up Now
- B-side: "Every Night"
- Released: October 11, 1986
- Genre: Country
- Label: RCA Nashville
- Songwriter(s): Dennis Linde
- Producer(s): Mark Wright

Pake McEntire singles chronology
"Savin' My Love for You" (1986)	"Bad Love" (1986)	"Heart vs. Heart" (1987)

"Bad Love" is a song recorded by American country music artist Pake McEntire. It was released in October 1986 as the third single from the album Too Old to Grow Up Now. The song reached #12 on the Billboard Hot Country Singles & Tracks chart. The song was written by Dennis Linde.

== Chart performance ==
Chart (1986)	Peak position
US Hot Country Songs (Billboard)	12
Canadian RPM Country Tracks	15
