= The Heart of the Matter (Kenny Rogers album) =

Studio album by Kenny Rogers
- Released: 30 Sep 1985
- Recorded: 1985
- Studios: Sunset Sound and Hollywood Sound Recorders (Hollywood, California); Lion Share Studios (Los Angeles, California); Soundcastle (Santa Monica, California); Evergreen Studios (Burbank, California); Studio Marcadet (Paris, France)
- Genre: Country
- Length: 37:50
- Label: RCA Victor
- Producer: George Martin

Kenny Rogers chronology
The Kenny Rogers Story (1985)	The Heart of the Matter (1985)	Love Is What We Make It (1985)

Singles from The Heart of the Matter
- 1. "Morning Desire" Released: October 7, 1985; 2. "Tomb of the Unknown Love" Released: February 7, 1986

Professional ratings
Review scores
Source	Rating
Allmusic	link

The Heart of the Matter is the seventeenth studio album by American singer Kenny Rogers, released by RCA Records in 1985. It was Rogers' eleventh album to reach #1 on Billboard's Country albums chart and certified Gold by the RIAA. It peaked at #51 on the US Billboard 200 and was produced by George Martin.

Two singles came from this album. "Morning Desire" reached the top of the country charts, as well as #8 on the adult contemporary chart and #72 on the pop charts. His next single, "Goodbye Marie", came from the Short Stories album (also released after Rogers signed to RCA) and charted. The final single from this album followed, "Tomb of the Unknown Love", was a #1 hit in the country charts.

== Track listing ==
No.	Title	Writer(s)	Length
1.	"I Don't Wanna Have to Worry"	Steve Crossley, Michael Smotherman	3:40
2.	"The Heart of the Matter"	Smotherman	4:36
3.	"You Made Me Feel Love"	John Goin, Dave Loggins	3:41
4.	"Morning Desire"	Loggins	4:09
5.	"Don't Look in My Eyes"	Brian Potter, Frank Wildhorn	3:34
6.	"The Best of Me"	David Foster, Jeremy Lubbock, Richard Marx	4:01
7.	"Tomb of the Unknown Love"	Smotherman	4:03
8.	"People in Love"	Mike Dekle, Byron Hill	3:03
9.	"I Can't Believe Your Eyes"	Graham Lyle, Troy Seals	3:02
10.	"Our Perfect Song"	David Briggs, Linda Thompson	4:01

== Personnel ==
- Kenny Rogers – lead vocals
- Anne Dudley – keyboards (1, 2, 4, 7)
- John Hobbs – keyboards (1, 3, 5, 8–10)
- Randy Waldman – keyboards (5, 8, 10)
- David Foster – acoustic piano (6), synthesizers (6), Moog bass (6), LinnDrum (6)
- Jeremy Lubbock – additional keyboards (6)
- Jimmy Cox – keyboards (9)
- Ian Bairnson – guitars (1, 2, 4, 7)
- Billy Joe Walker Jr. – guitars (1, 2, 4, 7)
- Michael Landau – guitars (3, 9)
- Steve Lukather – guitars (3)
- Stanley Jordan – guitar solo (4)
- Paul Jackson Jr. – guitars (5, 8, 10)
- Fred Tackett – guitars (5, 8, 10)
- Mo Foster – bass (1, 2, 4, 7)
- Joe Chemay – bass (3), backing vocals (3, 8)
- Neil Stubenhaus – bass (5, 8, 10)
- Nathan East – bass (9), backing vocals (9)
- Stuart Elliott – drums (1, 2, 4, 7)
- Leon "Ndugu" Chancler – drums (9), percussion (9)
- Steve Leach – percussion (1)
- Richard Marx – percussion (1), backing vocals (1)
- Kin Vassy – percussion (1), backing vocals (3, 4, 7–10)
- Terry Williams – percussion (1), backing vocals (1, 3, 4, 7, 8, 10)
- John Robinson – percussion (2), drums (3, 5, 8, 10)
- Gary Herbig – saxophones (1, 3)
- Larry Williams – saxophones (1)
- Bill Reichenbach Jr. – trombone (1)
- Gary Grant – trumpet (1, 9)
- Jerry Hey – trumpet (1, 9), horn arrangements (9)
- Donnie Sanders – saxello (2)
- James Galway – flute (6)
- James Thatcher – French horn (6)
- Richard Todd – French horn (6)
- Gayle Levant – harp (4)
- George Martin – arrangements (1, 3, 8)
- Kenny Rogers II – backing vocals (3, 9)
- Herb Pedersen – backing vocals (7, 9, 10)
- David Morgan – backing vocals (9)

Strings (Tracks 2, 4–6, 8, 10)

- George Martin – string arrangements (2, 4)
- Jeremy Lubbock – string arrangements and conductor (5, 6, 8, 10)
- Jules Chaikin – string contractor
- Israel Baker, Arnold Belnick, Denyse Buffum, Stuart Canin, Isabelle Daskoff, Assa Drori, Bruce Dukov, Ronald Folsom, Reginald Hill, Bill Hybel, William Hymanson, Dennis Karmazyn, Ray Kelley, Kathleen Lenski, Gordan Marron, Buell Neidlinger, Bill Nuttycombe, Garry Nuttycombe, Don Palmer, Jay Rosen, Sheldon Sanov, David Schwartz, Fred Seykoura, Marshall Sosson, Robert Sushel, Mari Tsumari-Botnick and Shari Zippert – string players

== Production ==
- George Martin – producer
- Terry Christian – engineer
- Jon Kelley – engineer, mixing
- John Richards – string recording
- Bino Espinoza – second engineer, mix assistant
- Laura Livingston – second engineer
- Stephen Shelton – second engineer
- Olivier de Bosson – second engineer (strings)
- Mike Wuellner – mix assistant
- Wally Traugott – mastering at Capitol Mastering (Hollywood, California)
- Antony Amos – product manager
- Becky Stewart – art direction
- John Coulter Design – design
- Matthew Rolston – photography
- Peter Doggett – liner notes
- Dreamcatcher Artist Management – management

== Charts ==
Chart (1985)	Peak position
U.S. Billboard Top Country Albums	1
U.S. Billboard 200	51
Australian (Kent Music Report) Albums	69
Canadian RPM Top Albums	57

== In popular culture ==
"Don't Look In My Eyes" was used by NBC Sports for a music video of the 1986 Boston Red Sox during the postgame show of the 1986 World Series, after the New York Mets defeated the Red Sox in Game 7 to win the World Championship.
