= Love's Gonna Get Ya! =

Studio album by Ricky Skaggs
- Released: 1986
- Studios: The Music Mill and Treasure Isle Recorders (Nashville, Tennessee); The Complex (Los Angeles, California)
- Genre: Country
- Length: 32:08
- Label: Epic
- Producer: Ricky Skaggs

Ricky Skaggs chronology
Live in London (1985)	Love's Gonna Get Ya! (1986)	Comin' Home to Stay (1988)

Singles from Love's Gonna Get Ya!
- 1. "Love's Gonna Get You Someday" Released: September 1986; 2. "Love Can't Ever Get Better Than This" Released: April 1987

Professional ratings
Review scores
Source	Rating
Allmusic	3/5 stars

Love's Gonna Get Ya! is the eighth studio album by American country music artist Ricky Skaggs. It was released in 1986 via Epic Records. The album peaked at number 3 on the Billboard Top Country Albums chart.

== Track listing ==
No.	Title	Writer(s)	Length
1.	"Love's Gonna Get You Someday"	Carl Chambers	3:32
2.	"I'm Beside Myself"	Carl Jackson, Ethan Reilly	2:52
3.	"I Wonder If I Care as Much"	Don Everly	3:11
4.	"Don't Stop Gypsy"	Larry Cordle	2:57
5.	"Hard Row to Hoe"	Jim Rushing	3:24
6.	"I Won't Let You Down"	Gary Burr	3:58
7.	"Walking in Jerusalem"	Traditional	4:42
8.	"Artificial Heart"	Johanna Hall, John Hall	3:47
9.	"Love Can't Ever Get Better Than This" (duet with Sharon White)	Irene Kelley, Nancy Montgomery	3:44
10.	"Daddy Was a Hard Working Honest Man"	Wayland Patton	3:11
11.	"Raisin' the Dickens"	Buddy Emmons	3:02
12.	"New Star Shining"	Johanna Hall, John Hall	3:30

== Personnel ==
- Ricky Skaggs – vocals, harmony vocals (1–4, 6), acoustic guitars (1, 3–6, 8, 9, 12), electric guitars (1, 5, 7), acoustic rhythm guitar (2, 10, 11), acoustic lead guitar (2, 10), mandolin (5, 7, 9), fiddle (5, 9), electric rhythm guitar (8), backing vocals (8), triangle (9), mandocaster (11)
- Gary Smith – acoustic piano (1, 2, 6–8, 11, 12), Kurzweil keyboard (4, 9), Yamaha DX7 (4, 9)
- Dennis Burnside – acoustic piano (3–5, 9, 10)
- Dave Innis – keyboards (6, 12)
- Carl Jackson – acoustic rhythm guitar (2), harmony vocals (2)
- John Hall – electric lead guitar (8), backing vocals (8)
- Terry Crisp – steel guitar (1, 2, 6, 8, 11)
- Lloyd Green – steel guitar (3, 4, 10)
- Jesse Chambers – bass (1, 2, 7–9, 11)
- Emory Gordy Jr. – bass (3, 4, 10)
- Joe Osborn – bass (5)
- Leland Sklar – bass (6, 12)
- Martin Parker – drums (1, 2, 7, 8, 11), percussion (7)
- Kenny Malone – drums (3, 4, 10), percussion (3, 4, 10)
- Eddie Bayers – drums (5, 6, 9, 12)
- Bobby Hicks – fiddles (1, 11)
- Wayland Patton – harmony vocals (1, 7)
- Kathy Chiavola – harmony vocals (4)
- Louis Pyrtle – harmony vocals (7)
- Bobby Jones and New Life – backing choir (7)
- Larry Hoppen – backing vocals (8)
- Sharon White-Skaggs – vocals (9)
- James Taylor – vocals (12)

== Production ==
- Ricky Skaggs – producer
- Ed Seay – recording, mixing
- Marshall Morgan – tracking engineer (1, 7, 8)
- George Massenberg – vocal overdub engineer
- Tom Der – recording assistant, mix assistant
- Tom Harding – recording assistant, mix assistant, tracking assistant (1, 7, 8)
- Sharon Rice – vocal overdub assistant
- George Marino – mastering at Sterling Sound (New York City, New York)
- Virginia Team – art direction
- Beverly Parker – photography
- Earl Cox – hair stylist
- Jeannie Bellar – make-up

== Chart performance ==
Chart (1986)	Peak position
U.S. Billboard Top Country Albums	3
