= Love Can't Ever Get Better Than This =

1987 single by Ricky Skaggs and Sharon White

Single by Ricky Skaggs with Sharon White

from the album Love's Gonna Get Ya!
- B-side: "Daddy Was a Hard Workin' Honest Man"
- Released: April 1987
- Genre: Country
- Length: 3:49
- Label: Epic
- Songwriters: Nancy Montgomery, Irene Kelley
- Producer: Ricky Skaggs

Ricky Skaggs singles chronology
"I Wonder If I Care as Much" (1987)	"Love Can't Ever Get Better Than This" (1987)	"I'm Tired" (1987)

"Love Can't Ever Get Better Than This" is a song written by Nancy Montgomery and Irene Kelley, and recorded by American country music artists Ricky Skaggs and Sharon White. It was released in April 1987 as the third single from the album Love's Gonna Get Ya!. The song reached #10 on the Billboard Hot Country Singles chart.

== Personnel ==
- Eddie Bayers – drums
- Dennis Burnside – piano
- Jesse Chambers – bass
- Ricky Skaggs – co-lead vocals, acoustic guitar, mandolin, fiddle, triangle, producer
- Gary Smith – Kurzweil and Yamaha DX7 synthesizers
- Sharon White – co-lead vocals

== Chart performance ==
Chart (1987)	Peak position
US Hot Country Songs (Billboard)	10
Canadian RPM Country Tracks	7
