= Irene Kelley =

American country and bluegrass musician

- Born: Latrobe, Pennsylvania
- Genres: Country, bluegrass
- Occupation: Singer-songwriter
- Years active: 1980s–present
- Labels: MCA, Madacy, Irk, Patio, Mountain Fever
- Website: www.irenekelley.com

Irene Kelley is an American country and bluegrass musician. As a songwriter, she has written for Ricky Skaggs, Alan Jackson, Loretta Lynn, and the Osborne Brothers.

== Early life ==
Kelley is originally from Pennsylvania and in high school sang in a Led Zeppelin cover band. She was asked to leave the group after suggesting the band cover songs from Dolly Parton.

== Career ==
Kelley moved to Nashville, Tennessee in the early 1980s. This was after visiting on her honeymoon in 1983 and discovering the first gathering of the International Bluegrass Music Association. Kelley co-wrote the Ricky Skaggs and Sharon White song "Love Can't Ever Get Better Than This" with Nancy Montgomery. The song peaked at number ten on the Billboard Hot Country Singles chart in 1987 and was awarded Duet of the Year at the Country Music Association Awards that same year. Kelley signed to MCA Records in the late 1980s.

== Discography ==
=== Albums ===
Title	Album details	Peak positions
Title	Album details	US Bluegrass
Simple Path	Release date: February 27, 2001; Label: Madacy	—
Thunderbird	Release date: October 25, 2004; Label: Irk	—
Pennsylvania Coal	Release date: February 11, 2014; Label: Patio Records	—
These Hills	Release date: June 17, 2016; Label: Mountain Fever Records	3
Benny's TV Repair	Release date: May 10, 2019; Label: Mountain Fever Records	—

=== Singles ===
Year	Single	Peak positions
Year	Single	US Country
1989	"Love Is a Hard Road"	67
1991	"A Rock and a Rolling Stone"	—
2018	"Something About a Train Sound"	—

=== Music videos ===
Year	Video	Director
1991	"A Rock And A Rolling Stone"	
2003	"A Little Bluer Than That"	
