= Live in London (Ricky Skaggs album) =

Live album by Ricky Skaggs
- Released: 1985
- Venues: Dominion Theater (London, UK)
- Studios: Audio Media Recorders (Nashville, Tennessee)
- Genre: Country
- Length: 45:24
- Label: Epic
- Producer: Ricky Skaggs

Ricky Skaggs chronology
Favorite Country Songs (1985)	Live in London (1985)	Love's Gonna Get Ya! (1986)

Singles from Live in London
- 1. "You Make Me Feel Like a Man" Released: August 1985; 2. "Cajun Moon" Released: January 1986; 3. "I've Got a New Heartache" Released: May 1986

Professional ratings
Review scores
Source	Rating
Allmusic	4.5/5 stars

Live in London is the first live album by American country music artist Ricky Skaggs. It was released in 1985 via Epic Records. The album peaked at number 1 on the Billboard Top Country Albums chart.

== Track listing ==
No.	Title	Writer(s)	Length
1.	"Uncle Pen"	Bill Monroe	4:44
2.	"Heartbroke"	Guy Clark	3:10
3.	"She Didn't Say Why"	Wayland Patton	4:03
4.	"Cajun Moon"	Jim Rushing	4:40
5.	"Country Boy"	Tony Colton, Albert Lee, Ray Smith	3:39
6.	"I've Got a New Heartache"	Ray Price, Wayne Walker	3:35
7.	"You Make Me Feel Like a Man"	Peter Rowan	4:45
8.	"Rockin' the Boat"	Rushing, Ricky Skaggs	4:20
9.	"Honey (Open That Door)"	Mel Tillis	5:58
10.	"Don't Get Above Your Raisin'"	Lester Flatt, Earl Scruggs	7:30
Total length:			45:24

== Personnel ==
The Ricky Skaggs Band

- Ricky Skaggs – lead vocals, lead guitars, mandolin, mandocaster, fiddle
- Gary Smith – acoustic piano
- Bruce Bouton – electric rhythm guitar, dobro, pedal steel guitar
- Richard Dennison – guitars, vocals
- Lou Reid – acoustic guitar, banjo, fiddle, vocals
- Bobby Hicks – banjo, fiddle
- Jesse Chambers – bass
- Martin Parker – drums

Special guest

- Elvis Costello – guitar and vocals on "Don't Get Above Your Raisin"

== Production ==
- Ricky Skaggs – producer
- Marshall Morgan – recording, mixing
- Hollis Halford – assistant engineer
- Bob Wright – assistant engineer
- Glenn Meadows – mastering at Masterfonics (Nashville, Tennessee)
- Virginia Team – art direction
- Jeff Morris – design
- Larry Williams – photography
- Chip Peay Enterprises – management

== Charts ==
=== Weekly charts ===
Chart (1986)	Peak position
US Top Country Albums (Billboard)	1

=== Year-end charts ===
Chart (1986)	Position
US Top Country Albums (Billboard)	6
