= Blue Love (song) =

1988 single by The O'Kanes

Single by The O'Kanes

from the album Tired of the Runnin'
- B-side: "Highway 55"
- Released: July 1988
- Genre: Country
- Length: 3:08
- Label: Columbia
- Songwriter(s): Jamie O'Hara, Kieran Kane
- Producer(s): Kieran Kane, Jamie O'Hara

The O'Kanes singles chronology
"One True Love" (1988)	"Blue Love" (1988)	"Rocky Road" (1988)

"Blue Love" is a song written and recorded by American country music duo The O'Kanes. It was released in July 1988 as the second single from the album Tired of the Runnin'. The song reached number 10 on the Billboard Hot Country Singles & Tracks chart.

== Chart performance ==
Chart (1988)	Peak position
US Hot Country Songs (Billboard)	10
Canadian RPM Country Tracks	18
