= The O'Kanes =

American country music vocal duo

- Jamie O'Hara and Kieran Kane

Background information
- Origin: Nashville, Tennessee, U.S.
- Genres: Country
- Years active: 1986–1990
- Label: Columbia
- Past members: Jamie O'Hara; Kieran Kane

The O'Kanes were an American country music duo composed of Jamie O'Hara and Kieran Kane, both vocalists and guitarists. Active between 1986 and 1990, the duo recorded three albums for Columbia Records and charted seven singles on the Billboard Hot Country Singles (now Hot Country Songs) chart, including "Can't Stop My Heart from Loving You".

== Biography ==
The O'Kanes consisted of singer-songwriters Jamie O'Hara and Kieran Kane. Kane was born October 7, 1949, in Queens, New York, and began performing at the age of nine. He then moved to Los Angeles, California, to begin working professionally in the music industry. After this, he was persuaded by country singer Deborah Allen to move to Nashville, Tennessee. By 1980, he had signed to Elektra Records as a solo artist, where he recorded one album and charted eight singles on the Billboard Hot Country Songs charts. He also received a nomination from the Academy of Country Music Awards for Top New Male Vocalist in 1983, losing to Michael Martin Murphy. O'Hara (August 8, 1950 – January 7, 2021) was born and raised in Toledo, Ohio, and initially sought to play American football until an injury forced him to pursue a musical career as well. He supported himself by performing at various nightclubs throughout the Midwestern United States until also moving to Nashville by the end of the 1970s.

The two songwriters met for the first time when both had publishing contracts with Tree International Publishing in Nashville. At the time, O'Hara had success with the songs "Older Women" and "Wandering Eyes", both recorded by Ronnie McDowell, as well as "Grandpa (Tell Me 'Bout the Good Old Days)" by The Judds. Inspired by the success of these songs, O'Hara chose to write with Kane after the two met each other and realized they worked for the same company. One of their collaborations, "Bluegrass Blues", was recorded by both the Judds and Southern Pacific. The two of them then decided to record demos of their collaborative songs. Initially, they did not intend to become an official performing act, but ultimately chose to do so after both of them reacted favorably to the sound of their recordings.

=== Musical career ===
O'Hara and Kane began performing together as The O'Kanes in 1986. That same year, the duo signed to Columbia Records Nashville and released their self-titled debut album, which consisted entirely of their original demo recordings. According to Kane, record executives insisted on letting the duo sing, write, and produce entirely by themselves, so that the recording could be satisfactory to the both of them. The O'Kanes charted four singles on Billboard Hot Country Songs between 1986 and 1987. These were "Oh Darlin' (Why Don't You Care for Me No More)", "Can't Stop My Heart from Loving You", "Daddies Need to Grow Up Too", and "Just Lovin' You". Of these, "Can't Stop My Heart from Loving You" peaked at number one, while the other three all reached top ten. Tired of the Runnin' charted the top-ten hits "One True Love" and "Blue Love" upon its 1988 release, but the third single "Rocky Road" fell short of the top 40. A third and final Columbia album, Imagine That, charted no singles upon its 1990 release, and the duo disbanded soon after.

After they disbanded in 1990, both members pursued solo careers, and Kane founded a record label named Dead Reckoning Records. O'Hara died of cancer on January 7, 2021, at age 70.

== Discography ==
=== Albums ===
Title	Album details	Peak positions
Title	Album details	US Country
The O'Kanes	Release date: 1986; Label: Columbia Records	9
Tired of the Runnin'	Release date: 1988; Label: Columbia Records	21
Imagine That	Release date: January 5, 1990; Label: Columbia Records	63

=== Singles ===
Year	Single	Peak positions		Album
Year	Single	US Country	CAN Country	Album
1986	"Oh Darlin' (Why Don't You Care for Me No More)"	10	6	The O'Kanes
1987	"Can't Stop My Heart from Loving You"	1	1	The O'Kanes
1987	"Daddies Need to Grow Up Too"	9	12	The O'Kanes
1987	"Just Lovin' You"	5	9	The O'Kanes
1988	"One True Love"	4	5	Tired of the Runnin'
1988	"Blue Love"	10	18	Tired of the Runnin'
1988	"Rocky Road"	71	79	Tired of the Runnin'
1990	"Why Should I"	—^{A}	75	Imagine That
1990	"Diddy All Night Long"	—^{A}	73	Imagine That
1990	"Tell Me I Was Dreaming"	—	—	Imagine That
"—" denotes releases that did not chart

Notes:

- ^{A} "Why Should I?" and "Diddy All Night Long" did not chart on Hot Country Songs, but both peaked at No. 7 on Hot Country Radio Breakouts.

=== Music videos ===
Year	Video	Director
1987	"Oh Darlin'"	
1988	"One True Love"	
