= The O'Kanes (album) =

Studio album by The O'Kanes
- Released: 1986
- Genre: Country
- Length: 32:35
- Label: Columbia
- Producer: Jamie O'Hara, Kieran Kane

The O'Kanes chronology
The O'Kanes (1986)	Tired of the Runnin' (1988)

The O'Kanes is the self-titled debut album by American country music duo The O'Kanes. It was released in 1986 via Columbia Records. The album includes the singles "Oh Darlin' (Why Don't You Care for Me No More)", "Can't Stop My Heart from Loving You". "Daddies Need to Grow Up Too" and "Just Lovin' You".

== Track listing ==
All tracks are written by Jamie O'Hara and Kieran Kane except "That's All Right", written by Arthur Crudup.

No.	Title	Length
1.	"Oh Darlin' (Why Don't You Care for Me No More)"	2:51
2.	"Just Lovin' You"	3:13
3.	"Daddies Need to Grow Up Too"	3:07
4.	"Can't Stop My Heart from Loving You"	2:47
5.	"Bluegrass Blues"	4:52
6.	"Oh Lonesome You"	2:31
7.	"When We're Gone, Long Gone"	3:40
8.	"That's All Right Mama"	2:30
9.	"Gonna Walk That Line"	2:59
10.	"When I Found You"	4:05

== Chart performance ==
Chart (1986)	Peak position
US Top Country Albums (Billboard)	9
