= You Make Me Feel Like a Man =

Single by Ricky Skaggs

from the album Live in London
- B-side: "Rendezvous"
- Released: August 1985
- Genre: Country
- Length: 4:45
- Label: Epic
- Songwriter(s): Peter Rowan
- Producer(s): Ricky Skaggs

Ricky Skaggs singles chronology
"Country Boy" (1985)	"You Make Me Feel Like a Man" (1985)	"Cajun Moon" (1986)

"You Make Me Feel Like a Man" is a song written by Peter Rowan, and recorded by American country music artist Ricky Skaggs. It was released in August 1985 as the first single from his album Live in London. The song reached #7 on the Billboard Hot Country Singles chart in December 1985 and #8 on the RPM Country Tracks chart in Canada.

== Chart performance ==
Chart (1985)	Peak position
US Hot Country Songs (Billboard)	7
Canadian RPM Country Tracks	8
