= Repetitive Regret =

Single by Eddie Rabbitt

from the album Rabbitt Trax
- B-side: "Letter from Home"
- Released: March 22, 1986
- Genre: Country
- Length: 3:23
- Label: RCA Victor
- Songwriters: Reed Nielsen; Mark Wright
- Producer: Richard Landis

Eddie Rabbitt singles chronology
"A World Without Love" (1985)	"Repetitive Regret" (1986)	"Both to Each Other (Friends and Lovers)" (1986)

"Repetitive Regret" is a song written by Reed Nielsen and Mark Wright, and recorded by American country music artist Eddie Rabbitt. It was released in March 1986 as the second single from the album Rabbitt Trax. The song reached number 4 on the Billboard Hot Country Singles & Tracks chart.

== Chart performance ==
Chart (1986)	Peak position
US Hot Country Songs (Billboard)	4
Canadian RPM Country Tracks	5
