= Wandering Eyes =

Single by Ronnie McDowell

from the album Going, Going, Gone
- B-side: "What Would Heaven Say"
- Released: December 27, 1980
- Genre: Country
- Length: 3:01
- Label: Epic
- Songwriter: Jamie O'Hara
- Producer: Buddy Killen

Ronnie McDowell singles chronology
"Gone" (1980)	"Wandering Eyes" (1980)	"Older Women" (1981)

"Wandering Eyes" is a song written by Jamie O'Hara, and recorded by American country music artist Ronnie McDowell. It was released in December 1980 as the second single from the album Going, Going, Gone. The song reached #2 on the Billboard Hot Country Singles & Tracks chart.

== Chart performance ==
Chart (1980–1981)	Peak position
US Hot Country Songs (Billboard)	2
Canadian RPM Country Tracks	27
