= Surely You Joust =

Studio album by Ray Stevens
- Released: June 1986
- Studio: Ray Stevens Studio, Nashville, Tennessee
- Genre: Country; novelty
- Label: MCA
- Producer: Ray Stevens

Ray Stevens chronology
I Have Returned (1985)	Surely You Joust (1986)	The Very Best of Ray Stevens/Roger Miller (1986)

Surely You Joust is the twenty-third studio album by Ray Stevens and his third for MCA Records. The album's front cover shows Stevens disguised as a medieval knight with a horse standing next to him. The album's back cover shows Stevens in the same costume but in a junk pile with two junk men. Three singles were lifted from the album: "Southern Air" (featuring Jerry Clower and Minnie Pearl), "People's Court", and "Can He Love You Half as Much as I", the last of which did not chart.

== Track listing ==
Side A
No.	Title	Writer(s)	Length
1.	"Southern Air" (Special guest appearances by Jerry Clower and Minnie Pearl)	Brent Holmes, Stuart Dill	5:25
2.	"People's Court"	C.W. Kalb, Jr., David Slater, Jack White	4:43
3.	"Bionie and the Robotics"	Stevens, Kalb	4:28
4.	"Makin' the Best of a Bad Situation"	Dick Feller	2:56
5.	"Fat"	Kalb	3:29

Side B
No.	Title	Writer(s)	Length
1.	"Can He Love You Half as Much as I"	Kalb	2:50
2.	"Smokey Mountain Rattlesnake Retreat"	Kalb	3:21
3.	"The Camping Trip"	Stevens, Kalb	5:50
4.	"Camp Werthahekahwee"	Bobby Russell	3:53
5.	"Dudley Dorite (Of the Highway Patrol)"	Kalb	4:35

== Album credits ==
Per liner notes.

- Ray Stevens – producer, arrangements, art direction
- Stuart Keathley – engineer
- Ray Stevens Studio (Nashville, Tennessee) – recording location
- Glenn Meadows – mastering at Masterfonics (Nashville, Tennessee)
- Susan Lawson – production coordinator
- Slick Lawson – art direction, photography
- Barnes & Company – design
- Camille Engel Advertising – CD design

Musicians

- Ray Stevens – vocals, backing vocals, keyboards, synthesizers, trumpet
- Shane Keister – vocoder programming
- Mark Casstevens – rhythm guitars, banjo
- Steve Gibson – electric guitars, dobro, mandolin
- Jack Williams – bass guitar
- Jerry Kroon – drums
- Johnny Gimble – fiddle
- Denis Solee – saxophones
- Norro Wilson – armpit sounds
- Lisa Silver – backing vocals
- Wendy Suits – backing vocals
- Diane Tidwell – backing vocals

== Chart performance ==
=== Album ===
Chart (1986)	Peak position
U.S. Billboard Top Country Albums	11

=== Singles ===
Year	Single	Peak positions
Year	Single	US Country
1986	"Southern Air"	63
1986	"People's Court"	70
