= I've Got a New Heartache =

1956 single by Ray Price

Single by Ray Price

from the album Greatest Hits
- B-side: "Wasted Words"
- Released: November 10, 1956
- Genre: Country
- Label: Columbia
- Songwriter(s): Ray Price, Wayne Walker

Ray Price singles chronology
"Crazy Arms" (1956)	"I've Got a New Heartache" (1956)	"I'll Be There (When You Get Lonely)" (1956)

"I've Got a New Heartache" is a song recorded by American country music artist Ray Price. It was released in November 1956 as the first single from his Greatest Hits compilation album. The song reached #2 on the Billboard Hot Country Singles chart.

== Chart performance ==
Chart (1956)	Peak position
US Hot Country Songs (Billboard)	2

== Ricky Skaggs version ==
"I've Got a New Heartache"

Single by Ricky Skaggs

from the album Live in London
- B-side: "She Didn't Say Why"
- Released: May 1986
- Genre: Country
- Length: 2:58
- Label: Epic
- Songwriter(s): Ray Price, Wayne Walker
- Producer(s): Ricky Skaggs

Ricky Skaggs singles chronology
"Cajun Moon" (1986)	"I've Got a New Heartache" (1986)	"Love's Gonna Get You Someday" (1986)

The song was also recorded by American country music artist Ricky Skaggs. It was released in May 1986 as the third single from the album Live in London. The song reached #10 on the Billboard Hot Country Singles chart.

=== Chart performance ===
Chart (1986)	Peak position
US Hot Country Songs (Billboard)	10
Canadian RPM Country Tracks	7
