= A World Without Love (Eddie Rabbitt song) =

Single by Eddie Rabbitt

from the album Rabbitt Trax
- B-side: "You Really Got a Hold on Me"
- Released: October 12, 1985
- Genre: Country
- Length: 3:53
- Label: RCA Victor
- Songwriters: Eddie Rabbitt; Even Stevens; Phil Galdston
- Producer: Phil Ramone

Eddie Rabbitt singles chronology
"She's Comin' Back to Say Goodbye" (1985)	"A World Without Love" (1985)	"Repetitive Regret" (1986)

"A World Without Love" is a song co-written and recorded by American country music artist Eddie Rabbitt. It was released in October 1985 as the first single from the album Rabbitt Trax. The song reached number 10 on the Billboard Hot Country Singles & Tracks chart. It was written by Rabbitt, Even Stevens and Phil Galdston.

== Chart performance ==
Chart (1985)	Peak position
US Hot Country Songs (Billboard)	10
US Adult Contemporary (Billboard)	35
Canadian RPM Country Tracks	27
