= Blue Love (In My Heart) =

Single by Hank Williams
- A-side: "Singing Waterfall"
- Released: 1956
- Recorded: August 1948 – May 1949, Shreveport
- Genre: Country, Gospel
- Length: 2:06
- Label: MGM
- Songwriter(s): "Floyd Jenkins" aka Fred Rose

"Blue Love (In My Heart)" is a song written by Fred Rose (credited under the pseudonym "Floyd Jenkins") and recorded by Hank Williams. It was released as a posthumous single by MGM Records in 1956. Williams recorded the song while living in Shreveport working the Louisiana Hayride in 1948 and 1949. It was one of his several Rose compositions he performed on the Johnny Fair Syrup radio show on KWKH in Shreveport. Rose produced Hank's records and published his songs through his company Acuff-Rose.
