= Gloria Loring =

American singer and actress (born 1946)

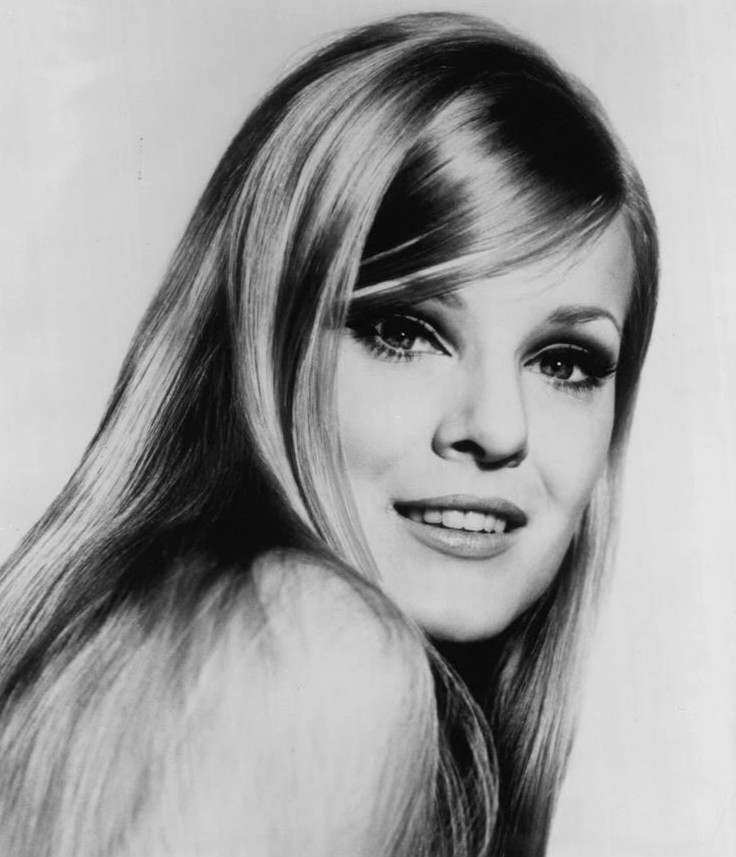
- Loring in 1969
- Born: Gloria Jean Goff; December 10, 1946 (age 79); New York City, U.S.
- Occupations: Actress, singer
- Years active: 1961–present
- Spouse: Alan Thicke (m. 1970; div. 1984)
- Children: 2, including Robin Thicke

Gloria Loring-Lagler (born Gloria Jean Goff; December 10, 1946) is an American singer and actress. She is known for playing Liz Chandler on Days of Our Lives for six years (1980–1986, 2024). She and singer-actor Carl Anderson performed the duet "Friends and Lovers," which reached number two on the Billboard Hot 100 chart in 1986.

== Early life ==
Gloria Jean Goff was born in New York City, the daughter of Dorothy Ann (née Tobin), a singer, and Gerald "Buzzy" Lewis Goff, a professional trumpet player with the Tommy Dorsey big band as well as other renowned swing groups; a salesman and hospitality/restaurant industry consultant.

== Career ==
Loring began her music career at age 14, singing with a folk group known as Those Four. Loring released her first album in 1968. It was titled Today on MGM Records. Several singles, including cover versions of Fred Neil's "Everybody's Talkin'" and Roger Whittaker's "New World in the Morning" were released on the Evolution label, though none charted. She also released, as a single, an early cover version of Joni Mitchell's "Chelsea Morning" in 1968.

She went on to perform on a wide range of television shows in the late 1960s and 1970s, from The Carol Burnett Show (Season 1, Episode 4, which first aired October 2, 1967) to the Academy Awards ceremony. Signed to Atco Records, she released the single "Brooklyn", produced by Mike Post, in 1977 under the alias Cody Jameson, and it became her first chart single, climbing to No. 74 on the Billboard Hot 100 and also appearing on the Adult Contemporary and Country Charts.

In March 1977, she flew to Toronto to be the special guest star on the popular weekly variety program The Bobby Vinton Show which was seen all across the United States and Canada. The program was produced by her husband Alan Thicke. Loring performed "Will You Love Me Tomorrow" and performed a duet with Vinton on "Breaking Up Is Hard to Do".

In 1978 and 1979, Loring and then-husband Alan Thicke composed the theme songs to Diff'rent Strokes and The Facts of Life. There were two versions of the Facts of Life theme song that Loring sang. One version was used from seasons two through six, and a second was used from seasons seven to nine.

Her son, Brennan, was diagnosed with Type 1 diabetes in 1979. A year later, Loring joined Days of Our Lives and got the idea to create and self-publish the Days Of Our Lives Celebrity Cookbook to raise money for diabetes research. Volume One was published in 1981 and the follow-up Volume Two in 1983. The cookbooks, along with her recording "A Shot in the Dark", raised more than $1 million for the Juvenile Diabetes Research Foundation ("JDRF"). She followed that success with three commercially published books, Kids, Food and Diabetes, Parenting a Child with Diabetes, and Living with Type 2 Diabetes: Moving Past the Fear.

For more than 30 years she has served as a spokesperson for JDRF. JDRF was the official philanthropy of her college sorority, Alpha Gamma Delta, before shifting its focus to fighting hunger in 2017.

In 1980, when Loring joined the NBC daytime soap Days of Our Lives as chanteuse Liz Chandler, the show was going through a dry spell, with many veterans dropped and many new faces alienating long-time fans. Of the nine new characters introduced in the 1980–1981 season, only Liz garnered a fan following, and was the only one to have her contract renewed. For three years, in real-life, Loring dated Don Diamont, the actor who played Carlo Forenza who was murdered by her TV husband Dr. Neil Curtis. Loring returned to the show in December 2024.

In 1986, Loring scored a No. 2 Pop and No. 1 Adult Contemporary hit record in the United States with "Friends and Lovers", with Carl Anderson (also a No. 1 country hit in 1986 for Eddie Rabbitt and Juice Newton under the title "Both to Each Other"). She originally performed "Friends and Lovers" on Days of Our Lives more than a year before it hit the charts. Her performance of the song generated the largest mail response of any song in NBC daytime history. First recorded as a duet with Anderson (who appeared on Days of Our Lives to sing the song with Loring) in 1985, its release as a single was delayed for a year by legal complications.

Loring left Days in 1986 and made sporadic film and television appearances over the next few decades. Her main efforts were spent in theater and in her recording career (though "Friends and Lovers" was her only major hit single).

In 2003, Loring released her first holiday album, You Make It Christmas. In 2008, she released A Playlist, which included a new recording of the song "Friends and Lovers" with Carl Anderson, recorded one year before he died.

Loring's book, Coincidence Is God's Way of Remaining Anonymous, is a spiritual autobiography of how a series of coincidences transformed her life. It was released in October 2012 by HCI, Inc.

== Bibliography ==
Year	Title	Publisher
1981	Days of Our Lives Celebrity Cookbook	Self-published
1983	Days of Our Lives Celebrity Cookbook - Vol. II	Self-published
1986	Kids, Food and Diabetes	Contemporary Books
1991	Parenting a Child with Diabetes: A Practical, Empathetic Guide to Help You and Your Child Live with Diabetes	Contemporary Books
2007	Living with Type 2 Diabetes: Moving Past the Fear	M Press
2012	Coincidence Is God's Way of Remaining Anonymous: Reflections on Daytime Dramas and Divine Intervention	HCI, Inc.

== Filmography ==
=== Film ===
Year	Title	Role	Notes
1965	Once Upon a Coffee House	Betty's Friend	Feature film
2016	Heavenly	Johnnie	Short film (independent)

=== Television ===
Year	Title	Role	Notes
1967	The Carol Burnett Show	Herself - performed "Goin' Out of My Head" and "Try to Remember"	Episode: "Lucille Ball, Tim Conway and Gloria Loring" (S1:E4)
1968	The Carol Burnett Show	Herself - performed "A Taste of Honey" and "I've Gotta Be Me." Jennifer (Valley of the Dollars sketch)	Episode: "Dionne Warwick and Jonathan Winters" (S1:E19)
1968	The Ed Sullivan Show	Herself - performed "Can't Take My Eyes Off of You"	Episode: Unknown
1977	The Bobby Vinton Show	Herself - performed "Breaking Up is Hard to Do" with Bobby Vinton	Episode: Unknown (the show was syndicated in the U.S.)
1980–1986, 2024	Days of Our Lives	Liz Chandler Curtis	Daytime serial (contract role 1980-1986); (guest role 2024)
1984	Fantasy Island	Charlene Hunt	Episode: "Mermaid and the Matchmaker/The Obsolete Man"
1985	Hotel	Adrianne Fitzpatrick	Episode: "Distortion"
1987	Convicted: A Mother's Story	Kate Devers	TV movie (NBC)
1987	Mike Hammer	Marian Collins	Episode: "Deadly Collection"
1987	Police Story	Kate Devers	TV movie
1987	Another World	Herself	Episode: #5970
1989	Murder, She Wrote	Margo Bowman	Episode: "Weave a Tangled Web"
1989	Freddy's Nightmares	Ellen Kramer	Episode: "Heartbreak Hotel"
1989	Living Dolls	Liz Wyler	Episode: "The Flash Is Always Greener"
1993	Saved by the Bell: The College Years	Mrs. Burke	Episode: "The Homecoming"
1994	Burke's Law	Sam	Episode: "Who Killed the Starlet?"
1994	Silk Stalkings	Sable Shannon	Episode: "Whore Wars"
1995	Renegade	Melissa Dixon	Episode: "Sins of the Father"
1996	Beverly Hills, 90210	Mrs. Cleveland	Episode: "Fearless"
1996	Renegade	Melissa Dixon	Episode: "For Better, For Worse"
1997	Renegade	Melissa Dixon	Episode: "The Bad Seed"
2014	Correcting Christmas (original title was Back to Christmas)	Robin	TV movie
2016	Growing Up Viral	Gram	TV movie (Disney XD)
TBA (pending)	I Love You But	Ruby	TV series

=== Music videos ===
Year	Title	Notes
1986	Friends and Lovers (Gloria Loring and Carl Anderson song)	Duet with Carl Anderson

== Personal life ==
Loring was married to actor Alan Thicke from 1970 until 1984. She has two sons with Thicke, Brennan and singer Robin.

Loring has been honored with the Lifetime Commitment Award from JDRF, and received the Woman of Achievement Award from the Miss America Organization. She has been featured in Who's Who in America.

== Discography ==
=== Albums ===
- 1968: Today (MGM Records); includes the original version of "One Way Ticket"
- 1970: And Now We Come to Distances (Evolution Records)
- 1972: Sing a Song for the Mountain (Evolution Records)
- 1984: A Shot in the Dark (Glitz Records); includes the full version of "The Facts of Life"
- 1986: Gloria Loring (Atlantic Records); includes the original version of "Friends and Lovers" with Carl Anderson – AUS #83; CAN #78
- 1988: Full Moon/No Hesitation (Atlantic Records) – AUS #62
- 1991: Is There Anybody Out There (Silk Purse); includes a solo version of "Friends and Lovers"
- 1999: Turn The Page (Silk Purse)
- 2000: By Request (Silk Purse); includes an acoustic recording of "Tonight, I Celebrate My Love", the song adopted by Bo & Hope as their theme song on Days of Our Lives
- 2001: Friends and Lovers (Silk Purse)
- 2003: You Make It Christmas (Silk Purse)
- 2008: A Playlist (Silk Purse)
