= Pake McEntire =

American country singer (born 1953)

- Born: Del Stanley McEntire; June 23, 1953 (age 72)
- Origin: Chockie, Oklahoma, U.S.
- Genres: Country
- Occupations: Singer; musician
- Instruments: Vocals; fiddle
- Years active: 1986–present
- Label: RCA Nashville

Del Stanley "Pake" McEntire (/ˈmækɪntaɪər/ MAK-in-tire; born June 23, 1953) is an American country music artist. He is the elder brother of Reba and Susie McEntire.

== Life and career ==
McEntire was born in Chockie, Oklahoma.

He signed to RCA Nashville in 1986. He made his debut on the national country music scene with the release of his first single, "Every Night", which peaked at No. 20 on the Billboard Hot Country Singles chart. It was followed by his biggest chart hit, "Savin' My Love for You", at No. 3. "Bad Love" and "Heart vs. Heart", also from his first album, were both minor hits as well.

McEntire's second album for RCA, My Whole World, was released in 1988. It produced two more minor chart entries before he was dropped from RCA's roster. Since then, he has issued three more albums on independent labels.

== Discography ==
=== Albums ===
Year	Album	US Country
1980	The Rodeo Man	
1986	Too Old to Grow Up Now	52
1988	My Whole World	
2003	And They Danced	
2005	Your Favorites & Mine	
2007	Singin' Fiddlin' Cowboy	
2008	The Other Side Of Me	

=== Singles ===
Year	Single	Chart positions		Album
Year	Single	US Country	CAN Country	Album
1986	"Every Night"	20	47	Too Old to Grow Up Now
1986	"Savin' My Love for You"	3	4	Too Old to Grow Up Now
1986	"Bad Love"	12	15	Too Old to Grow Up Now
1987	"Heart vs. Heart"	25	27	Too Old to Grow Up Now
1987	"Too Old to Grow Up Now"	46	51	Too Old to Grow Up Now
1987	"Good God, I Had It Good"	29	45	My Whole World
1988	"Life in the City"	62	—	My Whole World
