= Gotta Have You (Eddie Rabbitt song) =

Single by Eddie Rabbitt

from the album Rabbitt Trax
- B-side: "Singing in the Subway"
- Released: November 1, 1986
- Genre: Country
- Length: 3:47
- Label: RCA Victor
- Songwriters: Eddie Rabbitt; Reed Nielsen; Richard Landis
- Producer: Richard Landis

Eddie Rabbitt singles chronology
"Both to Each Other (Friends and Lovers)" (1986)	"Gotta Have You" (1986)	"I Wanna Dance with You" (1988)

"Gotta Have You" is a song co-written and recorded by American country music artist Eddie Rabbitt. It was released on November 1, 1986 as the fourth single from the album Rabbitt Trax. The song reached number 9 on the Billboard Hot Country Singles & Tracks chart. It was written by Rabbitt, Reed Nielsen and Richard Landis.

== Chart performance ==
Chart (1986–1987)	Peak position
US Hot Country Songs (Billboard)	9
Canadian RPM Country Tracks	6
