= Rabbitt Trax =

Studio album by Eddie Rabbitt
- Released: March 24, 1986
- Genre: Country
- Length: 33:55
- Label: RCA Records
- Producers: Richard Landis (tracks 1–5); Phil Ramone (tracks 6–9)

Eddie Rabbitt chronology
| The Best Year of My Life (1984) | Rabbitt Trax (1986) | I Wanna Dance with You (1988) |

Singles from Rabbitt Trax
- 1. "A World Without Love" Released: October 12, 1985; 2. "Repetitive Regret" Released: March 22, 1986; 3. "Friends and Lovers" Released: June 1986; 4. "Gotta Have You" Released: November 1, 1986

Rabbitt Trax is the tenth studio album by American country music artist Eddie Rabbitt, released in 1986 by RCA Records. The album produced four singles: "A World Without Love", "Repetitive Regret", "Both to Each Other (Friends and Lovers)" (a duet with the country-pop star Juice Newton) and "Gotta Have You". All of these singles reached the top ten on country charts, with the duet reaching No. 1.

== Track listing ==
| No. | Title | Writer(s) | Length |
|---|---|---|---|
| 1. | "Gotta Have You" | Eddie Rabbitt, Reed Nielsen, Richard Landis | 3:47 |
| 2. | "Repetitive Regret" | Nielsen, Mark Wright | 3:23 |
| 3. | "Both to Each Other (Friends and Lovers)" (duet with Juice Newton) | Jay Gruska, Paul Gordon | 3:50 |
| 4. | "When We Make Love" | Nielsen | 3:46 |
| 5. | "Letter from Home" | Nielsen | 4:08 |
| 6. | "Threw It Away" | Phil Pickett, Pauline Black | 3:36 |
| 7. | "Singing in the Subway" | Rabbitt, Mark Hudson | 3:31 |
| 8. | "This Moment" | Wayland Holyfield, Peter McCann | 3:35 |
| 9. | "A World Without Love" | Rabbitt, Even Stevens, Phil Galdston | 3:50 |

== Personnel ==
Musicians

- Eddie Rabbitt – lead vocals
- Phil Aaberg – keyboards (1–5)
- Alan Pasqua – synthesizers (1–5)
- David LeBolt – keyboards (6–9)
- Randy McCormick – keyboards (7–9)
- Phil Galdston – acoustic piano (9)
- George Doering – guitars (1–5)
- Fred Tackett – guitars (1–5)
- Andrew Gold – guitar solo (2)
- John McCurry – guitars (6–9)
- David Brown – acoustic guitars (8)
- Neil Stubenhaus – bass (1–5)
- Neil Jason – bass (6–9)
- John Robinson – drums (1–5)
- Liberty DeVitto – drums (6, 8, 9)
- Russ Kunkel – percussion (6), drums (7)
- Lawrence Feldman – alto saxophone (6), tenor saxophone (6)
- Ronnie Cuber – baritone saxophone (6)
- George Young – horns (7), tenor sax solo (7)
- Jim Pugh – trombone (6)
- Joe Shepley – trumpet (6)
- Lew Soloff – trumpet (6), flugelhorn (6)
- Charles Calello – arrangements (1–5)
- David Matthews – horn arrangements (6, 7)

Background and guest vocalists

- Andrew Gold – backing vocals (1–5)
- Jim Haas – backing vocals (1–5)
- Clydene Jackson – backing vocals (1–5)
- Jon Joyce – backing vocals (1–5)
- Reed Nielsen – backing vocals (1–5)
- Eddie Rabbitt – backing vocals (1–5)
- Julia Tillman Waters – backing vocals (1–5)
- Maxine Waters Willard – backing vocals (1–5)
- Juice Newton – lead vocals (3)
- Rory Dodd – backing vocals (6)
- Peter Hewlett – backing vocals (6, 7)
- Karen Kamon – backing vocals (6, 7)
- Eric Troyer – backing vocals (6)
- Carly Simon – whistle (6)
- Mark Hudson – backing vocals (7)
- Randy McCormick – backing vocals (7)
- Bobby Jones and New Life – backing vocals (9)

== Production ==
Tracks #1–5

- Richard Landis – producer
- Csaba Pectoz – recording
- Ed Thacker – recording, mixing
- Darren Klein – recording assistant
- Richard McKernon – recording assistant
- Charlie Paakkari – recording assistant
- Stan Katayama – mix assistant
- Conway Studios, Capital Studios and The Grey Room (Hollywood, California); Master Control (Burbank, California); Doering Studio – recording locations
- Can-Am Recorders (Tarzana, California) – mixing location
- Wally Traugott – mastering at Capitol Records (Hollywood, California)
- Kathy Anaya – production manager

Tracks #6–9

- Phil Ramone – producer
- Peter Hefter – engineer, assistant engineer
- Wayne Tarnowski – engineer
- Ken Criblez – assistant engineer
- Kerry Kopp – technical supervisor
- Chris Muth – technical supervisor
- Doug Oberkircher – technical supervisor
- Peter Roder – technical supervisor
- Emerald Sound Studios (Nashville, Tennessee) and The Hit Factory (New York City, New York) – recording locations
- Ted Jensen – mastering at Sterling Sound (New York City, New York)
- Hank Williams – mastering at MasterMix (Nashville, Tennessee)

Additional credits

- Joseph D'Ambrosio – project coordinator
- Bill Brunt – art direction
- Greg Gorman – photography
- Stan Moress – management

== Charts ==
=== Weekly charts ===
| Chart (1986) | Peak position |
|---|---|
| US Top Country Albums (Billboard) | 6 |

=== Year-end charts ===
| Chart (1986) | Position |
|---|---|
| US Top Country Albums (Billboard) | 39 |

=== Singles ===
| Year | Single | Peak chart positions | | |
| Year | Single | US Country | US AC | CAN Country |
|---|---|---|---|---|
| 1985 | "A World Without Love" | 10 | 35 | 27 |
| 1986 | "Repetitive Regret" | 4 | — | 5 |
| 1986 | "Both to Each Other (Friends and Lovers)" (with Juice Newton) | 1 | — | 1 |
| 1986 | "Gotta Have You" | 9 | — | 6 |
