= Older Women =

Single by Ronnie McDowell

from the album Good Time Lovin' Man
- B-side: "Nobody's Perfect"
- Released: June 1981
- Genre: Country
- Length: 2:49
- Label: Epic
- Songwriter(s): Jamie O'Hara
- Producer(s): Buddy Killen

Ronnie McDowell singles chronology
"Wandering Eyes" (1980)	"Older Women" (1981)	"Watchin' Girls Go By" (1981)

"Older Women" is a song written by Jamie O'Hara, and recorded by American country music artist Ronnie McDowell. It was released in June 1981 as the first single from the album Good Time Lovin' Man. The song was McDowell's eleventh country hit and the first of two number one songs on the country chart. The single went to number one for one week and spent a total of ten weeks on the country chart.

== Charts ==
Chart (1981)	Peak position
US Hot Country Songs (Billboard)	1
Canadian RPM Country Tracks	1
