= Savin' My Love for You =

Single by Pake McEntire

from the album Too Old to Grow Up Now
- B-side: "I'm Having Fun"
- Released: April 1986
- Genre: Country
- Length: 3:10
- Label: RCA Nashville
- Songwriter(s): Michael Clark
- Producer(s): Mark Wright

Pake McEntire singles chronology
"Every Night" (1986)	"Savin' My Love for You" (1986)	"Bad Love" (1986)

"Savin' My Love for You" is a song recorded by American country music artist Pake McEntire. It was released in April 1986 as the second single from his album Too Old to Grow Up Now. The song peaked at number 3 on the Billboard Hot Country Singles chart. The song was written by Michael Clark.

== Chart performance ==
Chart (1986)	Peak position
US Hot Country Songs (Billboard)	3
Canadian RPM Country Tracks	4
