= The Haggertys =

- Also known as: Jim & Diane Haggerty
- Origin: West Huntingdon, Ontario, Canada
- Genres: Country
- Years active: 1980s
- Labels: National Foundation, B & C Records

The Haggertys were a Canadian country band who released a succession of singles during the 1980s. They had a good amount of success with their singles, with the best being "Hot on the Heels of Love" in 1986.

== Background ==
The group was really a duo, made up of Jim Haggerty and his wife Diane Haggerty. Hailing from West Huntingdon, Ontario, they were operating a farm when they found fame and were the parents of a fourteen-year-old boy and seven-year-old girl.

They sang together in church and community gatherings. It was in 1984 that they decided to pursue their music career more seriously with a full-time band.

The touring group consisted of Jim Haggerty on bass, Diane Haggerty on keyboards, Randy Hill on lead guitar and Pasi Leppikangas on drums. They were produced by John Collins at B&C Studios.

== Career ==
As Jim & Diane Haggerty, they recorded a Ted Barton composition, "I Can't Get the Feelin' (With Nobody Else but You)". Backed with the Mitch Johnson composition, "When I Get the Feelin'", it was released on National Foundation NF 172 in 1983. The sessions were produced by Johnny Dollar.

The Haggertys recorded "Tonight I'll Make It Up to You" which was released on B&C BC 006. It made its debut at No. 58 in the RPM Country Singles chart for the week of 27 April 1985. At week nine, the single peaked at No. 31 and held the position for another week.

It was reported in the 13 July issue of RPM Weekly that following the impression The Haggerty's made with the previous single, "Tonight I'll Make it Up to You", they were following up with" Headin' for a Heartbreak", a John Collins composition which was produced by Collins and Eric Baraga.

=== "Hot on the Heels of Love" ===
The Haggertys recorded "Hot on the Heels of Love", which was written by Eric Baragar and John Collins. It was backed with "I Can't Taste the Whiskey" and released in the United States on RCI Records R-2395 in 1986. The record did something uncommon at the time. It was a Canadian record that broke out in the United States before it did in Canada.

In Canada, the single peaked at No. 2 on the RPM CanCon chart for the week of 5 April. Also in Canada, it peaked at No. 8 on the RPM country chart for the week of 10 May.

=== Further activities ===
They won the RPM award in Outstanding New Artists category in 1986.

=== Debut album ===
It was reported in the September / October 1986 issue of Music Scene that The Haggertys had just completed their debut album. Among the tracks was a Jim Haggerty original, "Your Love Takes Me Away" and "Southern Bound", a song he co-wrote with producer John Collins. The musicians that played on the album were, Barry Haggarty on guitar, Ken Harnden on keyboards, Al Brisco on steel guitar, Marinus Vandertogt on bass and Steve Smith on drums. The strings were by Eric Baragar who also contributed to the compositions and production. The album would eventually provide six charting singles.

=== Further activities ===
They released the single, "All I Need Is You" which made the RPM Country chart. In its tenth charting week, the single peaked at No. 23 in the RPM Country Singles chart for the week of 16 August. It held that position for another week. It also got to No. 2 on the Top CanCon Country Singles chart.

They recorded "Your Love Takes Me Away" which was released on single, B&C BC-026. It debuted at No. 60 in the RPM Country Singles chart for the week of 1 August 1987.

Their song "Southern Bound" was released on single, B&C BC-024. It was new on the playlist of Radio CKBY-FM in Ottawa for the week of 14 February 1987. It also debuted that week at No. 56 on the RPM Country Singles chart.

During 1987, The Haggertys had been playing to well-received and full shows. They also had been showcased at the Ontario Summer Games for The Disabled. They were nominated for the Big Country Award for Country Group and Single of the Year categories. They had also had four award nominations that year in the Single, Album, Song and Duo of The Year categories.

They recorded "You Got Me Shakin'" which was backed with "Feels So Right", and released on B&C BC029. A week five, it peaked at No. 47 on the RPM Country chart for the week of 10 September 1988.

They released the single, "On Christmas Eve" on Major Label ML-001 in 1989.
