= Memories to Burn =

Single by Gene Watson

from the album Memories to Burn
- B-side: "Get Along Little Doggie"
- Released: October 19, 1985
- Genre: Country
- Length: 2:40
- Label: Epic
- Songwriter(s): Warren Robb, Dave Kirby
- Producer(s): Gene Watson

Gene Watson singles chronology
"Cold Summer Day in Georgia" (1985)	"Memories to Burn" (1985)	"Carmen" (1986)

"Memories to Burn" is a song written by Warren Robb and Dave Kirby, and recorded by American country music artist Gene Watson. It was released in October 1985 as the second single and title track from the album Memories to Burn. The song reached #5 on the Billboard Hot Country Singles & Tracks chart.

== Chart performance ==
Chart (1985–1986)	Peak position
US Hot Country Songs (Billboard)	5
Canadian RPM Country Tracks	2
