= Can't Stop My Heart from Loving You =

Single by The O'Kanes

from the album The O'Kanes
- B-side: "Bluegrass Blues"
- Released: January 1987
- Genre: Country
- Length: 2:49
- Label: Columbia
- Songwriter(s): Jamie O'Hara; Kieran Kane
- Producer(s): Jamie O'Hara; Kieran Kane

The O'Kanes singles chronology
"Oh Darlin' (Why Don't You Care for Me No More)" (1986)	"Can't Stop My Heart from Loving You" (1987)	"Daddies Need to Grow Up Too" (1987)

"Can't Stop My Heart from Loving You" is a song written and recorded by American country music duo The O'Kanes. It was released in January 1987 as the second single from the album The O'Kanes. The song became The O'Kanes' second country hit and the duo's only number-one country hit. The single went to number one for one week and spent a total of 22 weeks on the country chart.

== Charts ==
=== Weekly charts ===
Chart (1987)	Peak position
US Hot Country Songs (Billboard)	1
Canadian RPM Country Tracks	1

=== Year-end charts ===
Chart (1987)	Position
US Hot Country Songs (Billboard)	18
