= Every Night (Pake McEntire song) =

Single by Pake McEntire

from the album Too Old to Grow Up Now
- B-side: "Too Old to Grow Up Now"
- Released: January 18, 1986
- Genre: Country
- Label: RCA Nashville
- Songwriter(s): Layng Martine, Jr.
- Producer(s): Mark Wright

Pake McEntire singles chronology
"Every Night" (1986)	"Savin' My Love for You" (1986)

"Every Night" is a debut song recorded by American country music artist Pake McEntire. It was released in January 1986 as the first single from the album Too Old to Grow Up Now. The song reached #20 on the Billboard Hot Country Singles & Tracks chart. The song was written by Layng Martine, Jr.

== Chart performance ==
Chart (1986)	Peak position
US Hot Country Songs (Billboard)	20
Canadian RPM Country Tracks	47
