= Oh Darlin' (Why Don't You Care for Me No More) =

Single by The O'Kanes

from the album The O'Kanes
- B-side: "When I Found You"
- Released: September 1986
- Genre: Country
- Length: 2:53
- Label: Columbia
- Songwriter(s): Jamie O'Hara, Kieran Kane
- Producer(s): Kieran Kane, Jamie O'Hara

The O'Kanes singles chronology
"Oh Darlin' (Why Don't You Care for Me No More)" (1986)	"Can't Stop My Heart from Loving You" (1987)

"Oh Darlin' (Why Don't You Care for Me No More)" is a debut song written and recorded by American country music duo The O'Kanes. It was released in September 1986 as the first single from the album The O'Kanes. The song reached #10 on the Billboard Hot Country Singles & Tracks chart.

== Chart performance ==
Chart (1986)	Peak position
US Hot Country Songs (Billboard)	10
Canadian RPM Country Tracks	6
