= The Whites =

American country and gospel band

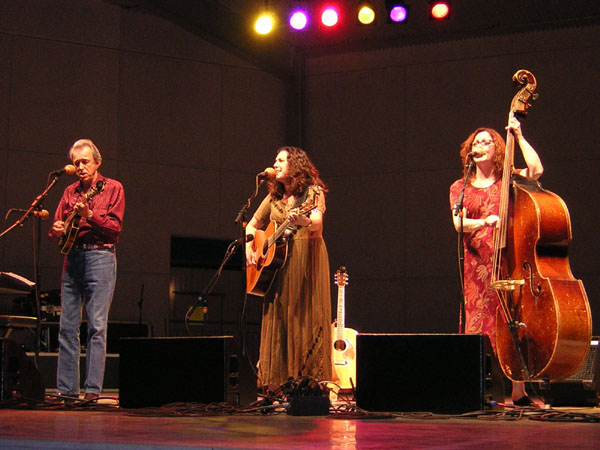
- The Whites performing in 2008

Background information
- Origin: Fort Worth, Texas, United States; Nashville, Tennessee, United States
- Genres: Bluegrass; Gospel; Country
- Years active: 1972–present
- Labels: Curb, Warner Bros., MCA, Ridge Runner, Word, Koch, Skaggs Family
- Members: Sharon White; Cheryl White
- Past members: Buck White

The Whites are an American country music vocal group from Fort Worth, Texas, United States. They consist of sisters Sharon White and Cheryl White, and, until his death, their father, Buck White. Sharon plays guitar, Cheryl is the bassist and Buck played the mandolin and piano. Formed in 1972, the trio has recorded multiple albums and charted multiple songs on the Billboard Hot Country Songs chart. They are also known as frequent collaborators of country and bluegrass musician Ricky Skaggs, who is Sharon's husband. The group are frequent performers on the Grand Ole Opry, and became members in 1984.

== Overview ==
The Whites consist of Sharon White (born December 17, 1953), her sister Cheryl (born January 27, 1955), and their father Buck (December 13, 1930 – January 13, 2025). Buck grew up playing music, and started playing at dances, wrestling arenas, and auditoriums; but did not really like the atmosphere. Buck had two jobs when the sisters were growing up; a plumber by day, and piano and mandolin player by night. He started really enjoying music when his family started playing together all around the world. In the beginning, Sharon took up bass when she was twelve, moving to guitar when Cheryl took over on bass.

In the 1980s, they scored such hits as "You Put The Blue In Me", "Hangin' Around", "Give Me Back That Old Familiar Feeling", "Pins And Needles", "If It Ain't Love (Let's Leave It Alone)", "Hometown Gossip", and "When The New Wears Off of Our Love".

In August 1981, Sharon White married Ricky Skaggs, who performed on several of the Whites' early releases. In 1987, the couple released the hit song, "Love Can't Ever Get Better Than This".

In 1991, the Whites joined producers Randall Franks and Alan Autry on the In The Heat Of The Night TV series album entitled Christmas Time's A Comin', performing on the track, "Let's Live Everyday Like It Was Christmas" (Sonlite/MGM/UA).

The Whites became members of the Grand Ole Opry in 1984 and were current regulars on the program in Nashville, Tennessee. Their collaborative album with Ricky Skaggs, "Salt of the Earth" won the 2008 Grammy for Best Southern/Country/Bluegrass Album.

The Whites can be heard on the O Brother, Where Art Thou? soundtrack with the song "Keep on the Sunny Side". They also appear in Down from the Mountain, the documentary of a concert given by the soundtrack artists.

The Whites were inducted into the Texas Country Music Hall of Fame on Saturday, August 16, 2008, in Carthage, Texas. They were inducted along with Buck Owens and Mickey Newbury.

Also performing on the Grand Ole Opry with Buck, Sharon and Cheryl is Rosanna, better known as Rosie, the third of the four White sisters. She performs high harmony and occasionally does solo performance of the Mel Tillis classic "The Violet and the Rose".

Buck White died on January 13, 2025, at the age of 94. The group entered a short hiatus after his death, but returned to performing on the Opry in August 2025.

== Awards and nominations ==
The Whites have been nominated for five CMA Awards (The Horizon/New Artist award 1983, Vocal Group of the Year 1983/1985 and Instrumental Group of the Year 1983/1985) and won the Album of the Year honour in 2001 for their contribution to O Brother, Where Art Thou?. In 1987, Sharon White and her husband Ricky Skaggs won the Vocal Duo of the Year award.

They also received Top Vocal Group nominations in 1982 and 1983 from the ACM Awards and an album of the year nomination for O Brother, Where Art Thou?.

In 1984, they were inducted into the Grand Ole Opry.

In 1987, Sharon White and her husband Ricky Skaggs won the Country Music Association Award for Vocal Duo of the Year.

Also for their contribution to O Brother, Where Art Thou?, The Whites won Album of the Year at the 2001 International Bluegrass Music Awards. That same year, Sharon and Cheryl also received the Recorded Event of the Year award for their contribution to Follow Me Back to the Fold: A Tribute to Women in Bluegrass. In 2006, they were awarded the IBMA's Distinguished Achievement Award for their contributions to the genre.

The Whites were among the artists honoured with the prestigious Grammy Award for Album of the Year for "O Brother, Where Art Thou?". Salt of the Earth, their 2007 collaboration with Ricky Skaggs won them a Grammy Award for Best Southern, Country or Bluegrass Gospel Album.

In 2007, The Whites and Ricky Skaggs received a GMA Dove Award for Bluegrass Recorded Album of the Year.

In 2008, they were inducted into the Texas Country Music Hall of Fame.

== Discography ==
=== Albums ===
Title	Album details	Peak positions	
Title	Album details	US Country	US Grass
Buck White & the Down Home Folks (as Buck White & the Down Home Folks)	Release date: 1972; Label: County Records	—	—
In Person (as Buck White & the Down Home Folks)	Release date: 1977; Label: County Records	—	—
That Down Home Feeling (as Buck White & the Down Home Folks)	Release date: 1977; Label: Ridge Runner Records	—	—
Poor Folks' Pleasure (as Buck White & the Down Home Folks)	Release date: 1978; Label: Sugar Hill Records	—	—
More Pretty Girls Than One (Buck White solo)	Release date: 1979; Label: Sugar Hill Records	—	—
Old Familiar Feeling	Release date: June 1983; Label: Curb / Warner Bros. Records	22	—
Forever You	Release date: June 1984; Label: Curb / MCA Records	37	—
Whole New World	Release date: March 1985; Label: Curb / MCA Records	42	—
Greatest Hits	Release date: 1986; Label: Curb / MCA Records	—	—
Ain't No Binds	Release date: February 1987; Label: Curb / MCA Records	37	—
Doing It By the Book	Release date: 1988; Label: The New Canaan Records	—	—
Give a Little Back	Release date: April 3, 1996; Label: Step One Records	—	—
A Lifetime in the Making Music	Release date: August 15, 2000; Label: Ceili Music	—	—
Love Never Fails (Sharon White with Barbara Fairchild and Connie Smith)	Release date: August 12, 2003; Label: Daywind Records	—	—
Salt of the Earth (with Ricky Skaggs)	Release date: September 25, 2007; Label: Skaggs Family Music	45	1
Hearts Like Ours (Sharon White with Ricky Skaggs)	Release date: September 30, 2014; Label: Skaggs Family Music	—	—
"—" denotes releases that did not chart

=== Singles ===
Year	Single	Peak positions		Album
Year	Single	US Country	CAN Country	Album
1981	"Send Me the Pillow That You Dream On"	66	—	—N/a
1982	"You Put the Blue in Me"	10	—	Old Familiar Feeling
1982	"Hangin' Around"	9	5	Old Familiar Feeling
1983	"I Wonder Who's Holding My Baby Tonight"	9	14	Old Familiar Feeling
1983	"When the New Wears Off of Our Love"	25	34	Old Familiar Feeling
1983	"Give Me Back That Old Familiar Feeling"	10	16	Old Familiar Feeling
1984	"Forever You"	14	30	Forever You
1984	"Pins and Needles"	10	12	Forever You
1985	"If It Ain't Love (Let's Leave It Alone)"	12	22	Whole New World
1985	"Hometown Gossip"	27	36	Whole New World
1985	"I Don't Want to Get Over You"	33	—	Whole New World
1986	"Love Won't Wait"	36	46	Greatest Hits
1986	"It Should Have Been Easy"	30	44	Ain't No Binds
1987	"There Ain't No Binds"	58	—	Ain't No Binds
1989	"Doing It By the Book"	82	—	Doing It By the Book
"—" denotes releases that did not chart

==== Sharon White solo singles ====
Year	Single	Peak positions		Album
Year	Single	US Country	CAN Country	Album
1987	"Love Can't Ever Get Better Than This" (with Ricky Skaggs)	10	7	Love's Gonna Get Ya! / Ain't No Binds
2003	"Closer to Home" (with Barbara Fairchild and Connie Smith)	—	—	Love Never Fails
2004	"Love Never Fails" (with Barbara Fairchild and Connie Smith)	—	—	Love Never Fails
2014	"Forever's Not Long Enough" (with Ricky Skaggs)	—	—	Hearts Like Ours
"—" denotes releases that did not chart
