= Friends and Lovers (Gloria Loring and Carl Anderson song) =

1986 single by Gloria Loring and Carl Anderson

Single by Gloria Loring and Carl Anderson

from the album Gloria Loring and Carl Anderson
- B-side: "You Always Knew" (Gloria Loring)
- Released: 1986
- Recorded: 1985
- Genre: Pop, adult contemporary
- Length: 3:50
- Label: USA Carrere / Atlantic / Epic
- Songwriters: Jay Gruska, Paul Gordon
- Producer: Yves Dessca

"Friends and Lovers" is a song written by Jay Gruska and Paul Gordon. The song was first recorded as a duet by Gloria Loring and Carl Anderson in 1985 for the soap opera Days of Our Lives, produced by Doug Lenier. That recording remained unreleased until the summer of 1986, when it was released shortly after a version by Juice Newton and Eddie Rabbitt hit country radio. The country version featured the altered title of "Both to Each Other (Friends and Lovers)".

== Pop version ==
Gloria Loring is a singer and actress who, beginning in 1980, portrayed the character Liz Chandler on the American soap opera Days of Our Lives. Her character was a lounge singer, so Loring was often called upon to perform on-screen; one of the songs she performed during this period was "Friends and Lovers". The song became the theme music for one of the popular supercouples on the show in the mid 1980s, Shane Donovan and Kimberly Brady (portrayed by Charles Shaughnessy and Patsy Pease).

In 1985, Carl Anderson (a Golden Globe-nominee for his portrayal of Judas Iscariot in the film and stage versions of the Andrew Lloyd Webber / Tim Rice rock opera Jesus Christ Superstar) appeared on Days of Our Lives and performed the duet with Loring. The commercial release of this duet was delayed for months before becoming available in the summer of 1986, first as a single on the label USA Carrere, then later on Anderson's self-titled album on Epic Records and Loring's eponymous album on Atlantic Records. According to Loring, it had been turned down by most of the major American record labels at the time, and she had taken to referring to the song informally as "Friends and Lawyers".

The song was a hit when released, spending two weeks at No. 2 on the Billboard Hot 100 chart on September 27 and October 4, 1986, behind "Stuck with You" by Huey Lewis and the News. It remained in the Top 40 for 14 of its 21 overall weeks on the chart. It reached No. 1 on the Billboard sales chart and No. 2 on the airplay chart (the two components of the Hot 100 chart). It also spent two weeks at No. 1 on the adult contemporary chart. "Friends and Lovers" would be the only Top 40 hit for either performer. Loring left Days of Our Lives at the same time the single started to descend down the music charts. Anderson eventually died in 2004 from complications arising from a long battle with leukemia.

=== Chart history ===
Chart (1986)	Peak position
Australia (Kent Music Report)	13
Canada RPM Adult Contemporary	1
Canada RPM Top Singles (2wks@1)	1
New Zealand (Recorded Music NZ)	43
US Billboard Hot 100	2
US Adult Contemporary (Billboard)	1
US Hot Black Singles (Billboard)	54

Year-end chart (1986)	Rank
Australia (Kent Music Report)	100
Canada	8
US Top Pop Singles (Billboard)	13

Chart (1987)	Position
Australia (Kent Music Report)	93

== Country version ==
"Both to Each Other (Friends and Lovers)"

Single by Eddie Rabbitt and Juice Newton

from the album Rabbitt Trax
- B-side: "A World Without Love"
- Released: June 1986
- Recorded: 1985
- Genre: Country
- Length: 3:55
- Label: RCA Victor
- Songwriters: Jay Gruska, Paul Gordon
- Producer: Richard Landis

Eddie Rabbitt and Juice Newton singles chronology
"Repetitive Regret" (1986)	"Both to Each Other (Friends and Lovers)" (1986)	"Gotta Have You" (1986)

Juice Newton singles chronology
"Old Flame" (1986)	"Both to Each Other (Friends and Lovers)" (1986)	"Cheap Love" (1986)

In 1986, country-pop singers Juice Newton and Eddie Rabbitt released a version of "Friends and Lovers", altering the title to emphasize the final line of the chorus. Technically, Newton and Rabbitt's recording is a pre-release cover version, since it was commercially available before the pop version was released. Therefore, even though Loring and Anderson recorded the song first, Newton and Rabbitt are credited with the original commercial version. Their duet was called "Both to Each Other (Friends and Lovers)", and although its arrangement differed from Loring and Anderson's recording, it is lyrically the same song. Both Newton ("Queen of Hearts", "Love's Been a Little Bit Hard on Me") and Rabbitt ("I Love a Rainy Night", "Every Which Way but Loose") had already enjoyed considerable success on both the pop and country music charts, and their version of the duet went to No. 1 on the Billboard country chart. This was Newton's final No. 1 though her last solo No. 1 had come eight months earlier with "Hurt".

=== Chart history ===
Chart (1986)	Peak position
US Hot Country Songs (Billboard)	1
Canadian RPM Country Tracks	1

== See also ==
- List of Hot Adult Contemporary number ones of 1986
