= Love's Gonna Get You Someday =

Single by Ricky Skaggs

from the album Love's Gonna Get Ya!
- B-side: "Walkin' in Jerusalem"
- Released: September 1986
- Genre: Country
- Length: 3:32
- Label: Epic
- Songwriter(s): Carl Chambers
- Producer(s): Ricky Skaggs

Ricky Skaggs singles chronology
"I've Got a New Heartache" (1986)	"Love's Gonna Get You Someday" (1986)	"I Wonder If I Care as Much" (1987)

"Love's Gonna Get You Someday" is a song written by Carl Chambers, and recorded by American country music artist Ricky Skaggs. It was released in September 1986 as the first single from his album Love's Gonna Get Ya!. The song reached #4 on the Billboard Hot Country Singles chart in December 1986 and #1 on the RPM Country Tracks chart in Canada.

== Charts ==
=== Weekly charts ===
Chart (1986–1987)	Peak position
US Hot Country Songs (Billboard)	4
Canadian RPM Country Tracks	1

=== Year-end charts ===
Chart (1987)	Position
US Hot Country Songs (Billboard)	21
