= Hot on the Heels of Love (The Haggertys song) =

Single by The Haggertys
- A-side: "Hot on the Heels of Love"
- B-side: "I Can't Taste the Whiskey"
- Released: 1985
- Length: 3:29
- Label: RCI Records R-2395
- Composer: John C. Collins/Eric R. Baragar
- Producers: John Collins and Eric Baragar

"Hot on the Heels of Love" was a 1985 single for Canadian country band, The Haggertys. It became a hit for them that year, registering in the RPM country singles chart and the RPM Top CanCon country chart.

== Background ==
Not to be confused with the 1973 minor hit of the same name by Winchester, this song was written by Eric Baragar and John Collins. It was backed with "I Can't Taste the Whiskey" and released in the United States on RCI Records R-2395 in 1986.

The record was released in Canada through B&C Records on 1 February 1986.

== Reception ==
The song was a recommended country single in Billboard for the week of 18 January 1986. It was referred to as "Peppy, good-time music".

It was reported by RPM Weekly in the publication's 22 February issue that "Hot on the Heels of Love" was one of four CanCon singles entering the chart. There was an indication that The Haggertys had a hit with the song. They were also getting recognition from country programmers in the United States.

It was reported in the 1 March 1986 issue of RPM Weekly that "Hot on the Heels of Love" which had been picked up by American programmers earlier, and was now a very hot CanCon item. The record had the rare distinction of being a Canadian record that broke out in the United States before it did in Canada.

It was reported in the 29 March 1986 issue of RPM Weekly that B&C Entertainment were experiencing a runaway success with "Hot on the Heels of Love".

== Airplay ==
For the week of 22 February, "Hot on the Heels of Love" was added to the playlists of Canadian stations, BX-93 in London, QM-FM in Peterborough and CKWX in Vancouver.

== Charts ==
=== RPM Country ===
"Hot on the Heels of Love" made its debut at No. 55 in the RPM Country Singles chart for the week of 22 February. Having been in the chart for twelve weeks, the single peaked at No. 8 for the week of 10 May.

=== RPM CanCon ===
For the week of 8 March, the single debuted at No. 9 in the Top CanCon Country Singles chart. The single peaked at No. 2 for the week of 5 April. It was still at that position for the week of 10 May.
