= Morning Desire =

1985 single by Kenny Rogers

Single by Kenny Rogers

from the album The Heart of the Matter
- B-side: "People in Love"
- Released: October 1, 1985 (Charted on October 19)
- Genre: Country
- Length: 4:09
- Label: RCA
- Songwriter: Dave Loggins
- Producer: George Martin

Kenny Rogers singles chronology
"Twentieth Century Fool" (1985)	"Morning Desire" (1985)	"Goodbye Marie" (1986)

"Morning Desire" is a song written by Dave Loggins, and recorded by American country music artist Kenny Rogers. It was released in October 1985 as the lead single from the album, The Heart of the Matter. The song was Rogers' twelfth number one on the country chart as a solo artist. The single went to number one for one week and spent a total of fourteen weeks on the country chart. Guitarist Stanley Jordan played lead guitar on the track.

== Chart performance ==
Chart (1985–1986)	Peak position
US Hot Country Songs (Billboard)	1
US Billboard Hot 100	72
U.S. Billboard Hot Adult Contemporary Tracks	8
Canadian RPM Country Tracks	1
Canadian RPM Adult Contemporary Tracks	3
