= Tomb of the Unknown Love =

1986 single by Kenny Rogers

Single by Kenny Rogers

from the album The Heart of the Matter
- B-side: "Our Perfect Song"
- Released: February 7, 1986
- Genre: Country
- Length: 4:03
- Label: RCA
- Songwriter: Micheal Smotherman
- Producer: George Martin

Kenny Rogers singles chronology
"Goodbye Marie" (1986)	"Tomb of the Unknown Love" (1986)	"The Pride Is Back" (1986)

"Tomb of the Unknown Love" is a song written by Micheal Smotherman and recorded by American country music artist Kenny Rogers. It was released in February 1986 as the second and final single from the album, The Heart of the Matter. The song was Rogers' thirteenth solo number one single on the country chart. The single went to number one for one week and spent a total of fourteen weeks on the country chart.

== Content ==
The narrator of the song, traveling during the winter season across the country to meet a woman (from whom he received a letter), stops at a diner in a small mining town near Taos, New Mexico, and hears a haunting sound in the cold wind. He asks the waitress about the sound; the waitress (and several truckers in the diner) laugh it off, calling it "the tomb of the unknown love" and direct the narrator to a gravestone "all by itself, beneath a tree, beside a hill" (the lyrics paying homage to the classic song "Green, Green Grass of Home"). The narrator reads the stone, which talks about a young man who was hanged after killing a woman who had cheated on him.

The second verse mentions that the narrator visits the woman for the very same reason – to kill her for ending their relationship (the letter presumably being a "Dear John letter"). He makes no effort to elude law enforcement, and in the end will also be hanged, only wondering if someday he will be buried in the same manner. Thus, it is ambiguous whether the narrator actually saw a grave, or a precursor to his own fatal end.

== Chart performance ==
Chart (1986)	Peak position
US Hot Country Songs (Billboard)	1
Canadian RPM Country Tracks	1
