= Cajun Moon =

Single by Ricky Skaggs

from the album Live in London
- B-side: "Rockin' the Boat"
- Released: January 1986
- Genre: Country, folk
- Length: 4:40 (album version). 3:42 (single version)
- Label: Epic
- Songwriter: Jim Rushing
- Producer: Ricky Skaggs

Ricky Skaggs singles chronology
"You Make Me Feel Like a Man" (1985)	"Cajun Moon" (1986)	"I've Got a New Heartache" (1986)

"Cajun Moon" is a song written by Jim Rushing, and recorded by American country music artist Ricky Skaggs. It was released in January 1986 as the second single from the album Live in London. The song was Skaggs' tenth #1 on the country chart. The single went to #1 for one week and spent 13 weeks on the country chart.

== Chart performance ==
Chart (1986)	Peak position
US Hot Country Songs (Billboard)	1
Canadian RPM Country Tracks	1
