= Jamie O'Hara (singer) =

American musician (1950–2021)

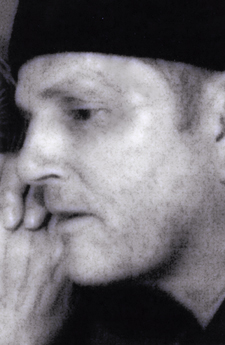

Background information
- Birth name: James Paul O'Hara
- Born: August 8, 1950; Toledo, Ohio, U.S.
- Died: January 7, 2021 (aged 70); Nashville, Tennessee, U.S.
- Genres: Country
- Occupation: Singer-songwriter
- Instrument(s): Vocals guitar
- Years active: 1986–2001, 2012–2021
- Labels: Columbia Nashville, RCA Nashville, Valley
- Formerly of: The O'Kanes
- Website: jamieoharamusic.com

James Paul O'Hara (August 8, 1950 – January 7, 2021) was an American country music artist. Between 1986 and 1990, he and Kieran Kane comprised The O'Kanes, a duo that charted seven singles on the Billboard Hot Country Singles charts, including the No. 1 single "Can't Stop My Heart from Loving You". After the O'Kanes disbanded in 1990, both O'Hara and Kane recorded solo albums of their own. In addition, O'Hara continued writing songs for other country music artists, including The Judds' 1986 hit "Grandpa (Tell Me 'Bout the Good Old Days)" which earned him a Grammy Award.

== Biography ==
O'Hara was born in Toledo, Ohio, where he attended Ottawa Hills High School (Ohio) and played Varsity Football. He had initially planned to pursue a career in American football, but after a career-ending knee injury, O'Hara shifted his focus to singing and songwriting. By 1975, he had moved to Nashville, Tennessee, where he was signed to a publishing contract. Among the songs that he composed throughout the 1980s were "Older Women" and "Wandering Eyes" a number one and number two single, both for Ronnie McDowell.

=== The O'Kanes ===
Kieran Kane, another songwriter who worked for the same publishing company, first collaborated with O'Hara on a song titled "Bluegrass Blues", eventually recorded by The Judds. Afterwards, the two began writing more songs together; by 1986, they decided to form a duo known as The O'Kanes. The same year, O'Hara wrote "Grandpa (Tell Me 'Bout the Good Ol' Days)", which was also recorded by The Judds; in addition to becoming a number one single on the country music charts, this song earned him a Grammy Award for Best Country Song.

Signed to Columbia Nashville in 1986, The O'Kanes recorded three studio albums for the label, in addition to charting seven singles on the Billboard Hot Country Singles charts. Their third album failed to produce any singles and by 1990, the duo parted ways, with both members assuming solo careers.

=== Return to solo career ===
O'Hara recorded a solo album for RCA Nashville in 1994. His only album for the label, Rise Above It, was issued that year, followed by a second album titled Beautiful Obsession seven years later. In addition, O'Hara continued to write songs for other artists, including cuts by Shelby Lynne, Gary Allan, and Trisha Yearwood.

=== Death ===
O'Hara died under the care of Alive Hospice on January 7, 2021, after being diagnosed with an aggressive form of cancer.

== Discography ==
=== Albums ===
Title	Details
Rise Above It	Release date: April 12, 1994; Label: RCA Nashville
Beautiful Obsession	Release date: September 25, 2001; Label: Valley Records
Dream Hymns	Release Date: July 5, 2012; Label: The 18th Wave

=== Singles ===
Year	Single	Album
1993	"What's a Good Ol' Boy to Do"	Rise Above It
1994	"The Cold Hard Truth"	Rise Above It
1994	"It Ain't Over (Til Your Heart Says It's Over)"	Rise Above It
1994	"50,000 Names"	Rise Above It

=== Music videos ===
Year	Video	Director
1993	"What's a Good Ol' Boy to Do"	Bubba Crigler
1994	"The Cold Hard Truth"	Brent Hedgecock
1994	"It Ain't Over (Til Your Heart Says It's Over)"	Brent Hedgecock
1994	"50,000 Names"	Brent Hedgecock
