= Earl Thomas Conley discography =

- Studio albums: 10
- Live albums: 1
- Compilation albums: 7
- Singles: 41
- Music videos: 11

The discography of Earl Thomas Conley, an American country music singer, consists of ten studio albums and 42 singles. He first charted in 1975 as Earl Conley for the GRT and Warner Bros. Records labels, before moving to Sunbird Records. He had his first number one in 1981 with "Fire & Smoke", and had a total of eighteen number ones between then and "Love Out Loud" in 1989.

== Studio albums ==
| Title | Album details | Peak positions |
| Title | Album details | US Country |
|---|---|---|
| Blue Pearl | Release date: October 17, 1980; Formats: LP, cassette; Label: Sunbird Records | 20 |
| Fire & Smoke | Release date: October 14, 1981; Formats: LP, cassette; Label: RCA Records | 19 |
| Somewhere Between Right and Wrong | Release date: August 16, 1982; Formats: LP, cassette; Label: RCA Records | 10 |
| Don't Make It Easy for Me | Release date: May 16, 1983; Formats: LP, cassette; Label: RCA Records | 3 |
| Treadin' Water | Release date: October 1, 1984; Formats: LP, cassette; Label: RCA Records | 2 |
| Too Many Times | Release date: September 18, 1986; Formats: CD, LP, cassette; Label: RCA Records | 3 |
| The Heart of It All | Release date: April 29, 1988; Formats: CD, LP, cassette; Label: RCA Records | 33 |
| Yours Truly | Release date: July 9, 1991; Formats: CD, cassette; Label: RCA Records | 53 |
| Perpetual Emotion | Release date: April 28, 1998; Formats: CD, cassette; Label: Intersound Records | — |
| Promised Land: The Lost Album | Release date: September 25, 2020; Formats: CD; Label: BFD Records | — |
"—" denotes releases that did not chart

- ^{A}Perpetual Emotion was re-released in 2003 under the title Should've Been Over By Now with one new song.

== Compilation albums ==
| Title | Album details | Peak positions |
| Title | Album details | US Country |
|---|---|---|
| Greatest Hits | Release date: 1985; Formats: CD, LP, cassette; Label: RCA Records | 1 |
| The Best of Earl Thomas Conley, Vol. One | Release date: 1987; Formats: CD, LP, cassette; Label: RCA Records | — |
| Greatest Hits, Volume II | Release date: February 14, 1990; Formats: CD, LP, cassette; Label: RCA Records | 35 |
| The Essential Earl Thomas Conley | Release date: April 16, 1996; Formats: CD, cassette; Label: RCA Records | — |
| Love Out Loud | Release date: September 8, 1998; Formats: CD, cassette; Label: BMG Special Products | — |
| Super Hits | Release date: September 29, 1998; Formats: CD, cassette; Label: RCA Records | — |
| 16 Biggest Hits | Release date: September 12, 2006; Formats: CD, digital download; Label: Legacy Recordings | — |
"—" denotes releases that did not chart

== Live albums ==
| Title | Album details |
|---|---|
| Live at Billy Bob's Texas | Release date: February 22, 2005; Formats: CD, digital download; Label: Smith Music Group |

== Singles ==
=== 1970s ===
| Year | Single | Peak chart positions | | Album |
| Year | Single | US Country | CAN Country | Album |
|---|---|---|---|---|
| 1971 | "The Night They Drove Old Dixie Down" | — | — | Non-album songs (as Earl Conley) |
| 1974 | "When I'm Under the Table (I'll Be Over You)" | — | — | Non-album songs (as Earl Conley) |
| 1975 | "I Have Loved You Girl (But Not Like This Before)" | 87 | — | Non-album songs (as Earl Conley) |
| 1975 | "It's the Bible Against the Bottle (In the Battle for Daddy's Soul)" | 87 | — | Non-album songs (as Earl Conley) |
| 1976 | "High and Wild" | 67 | — | Non-album songs (as Earl Conley) |
| 1976 | "Queen of New Orleans" | 77 | — | Non-album songs (as Earl Conley) |
| 1979 | "Dreamin's All I Do" (as Earl Conley) | 32 | 74 | Blue Pearl |
| 1979 | "Middle Age Madness" | 41 | — | Blue Pearl |
| 1979 | "Stranded on a Dead-End Street" (as the ETC Band) | 26 | — | Blue Pearl |
"—" denotes releases that did not chart

=== 1980s onward ===
| Year | Single | Peak chart positions | | Album |
| Year | Single | US Country | CAN Country | Album |
|---|---|---|---|---|
| 1980 | "Silent Treatment" | 7 | — | Fire & Smoke |
| 1981 | "Fire and Smoke" | 1 | — | Fire & Smoke |
| 1981 | "Tell Me Why" | 10 | — | Fire & Smoke |
| 1982 | "After the Love Slips Away" / "Smokey Mountain Memories" (Note: Single was released as a double A-side.) | 16 | 31 | Fire & Smoke |
| 1982 | "Heavenly Bodies" | 8 | 3 | Somewhere Between Right and Wrong |
| 1982 | "Somewhere Between Right and Wrong" | 1 | 39 | Somewhere Between Right and Wrong |
| 1983 | "I Have Loved You Girl (But Not Like This Before)" (re-recording) | 2 | 3 | Somewhere Between Right and Wrong |
| 1983 | "Your Love's on the Line" | 1 | 8 | Don't Make It Easy for Me |
| 1983 | "Holding Her and Loving You" | 1 | 2 | Don't Make It Easy for Me |
| 1984 | "Don't Make It Easy for Me" | 1 | 2 | Don't Make It Easy for Me |
| 1984 | "Angel in Disguise" | 1 | 1 | Don't Make It Easy for Me |
| 1984 | "Chance of Lovin' You" | 1 | 1 | Treadin' Water |
| 1985 | "Honor Bound" | 1 | 1 | Treadin' Water |
| 1985 | "Love Don't Care (Whose Heart It Breaks)" | 1 | 1 | Treadin' Water |
| 1985 | "Nobody Falls Like a Fool" | 1 | 1 | Greatest Hits |
| 1986 | "Once in a Blue Moon" | 1 | 1 | Greatest Hits |
| 1986 | "Too Many Times" (with Anita Pointer) | 2 | 3 | Too Many Times |
| 1986 | "I Can't Win for Losin' You" | 1 | 3 | Too Many Times |
| 1987 | "That Was a Close One" | 1 | 2 | Too Many Times |
| 1987 | "Right from the Start" | 1 | 1 | Too Many Times |
| 1988 | "What She Is (Is a Woman in Love)" | 1 | 2 | The Heart of It All |
| 1988 | "We Believe in Happy Endings" (with Emmylou Harris) | 1 | 1 | The Heart of It All |
| 1988 | "What I'd Say" | 1 | 1 | The Heart of It All |
| 1989 | "Love Out Loud" | 1 | 2 | The Heart of It All |
| 1989 | "You Must Not Be Drinking Enough" | 26 | 39 | The Heart of It All |
| 1990 | "Bring Back Your Love to Me" | 11 | 11 | Greatest Hits, Volume II |
| 1990 | "Who's Gonna Tell Her Goodbye" | 61 | 66 | Greatest Hits, Volume II |
| 1991 | "Shadow of a Doubt" | 8 | 4 | Yours Truly |
| 1991 | "Brotherly Love" (with Keith Whitley) | 2 | 6 | Yours Truly |
| 1992 | "Hard Days and Honky Tonk Nights" | 36 | 38 | Yours Truly |
| 1992 | "If Only Your Eyes Could Lie" | 74 | — | Yours Truly |
| 1998 | "Scared Money Never Wins" | — | — | Perpetual Emotion |
| 2002 | "Love's the Only Voice (I'm Gonna Listen To)" | — | — | Promised Land: The Lost Album |
"—" denotes releases that did not chart

=== As a featured artist ===
| Year | Title | Peak chart positions | | Album |
| Year | Title | US Country | CAN Country | Album |
|---|---|---|---|---|
| 1984 | "All Tangled Up in Love" (Gus Hardin with Earl Thomas Conley) | 8 | 8 | Wall of Tears |

== Music videos ==
| Year | Video | Director |
|---|---|---|
| 1982 | "Heavenly Bodies" | |
| 1982 | "Somewhere Between Right and Wrong" | |
| 1983 | "Your Love's on the Line" | |
| 1983 | "Holding Her and Loving You" | |
| 1984 | "Don't Make It Easy for Me" | |
| 1984 | "Angel in Disguise" | David Hogan |
| 1984 | "Crowd Around the Corner" | David Hogan |
| 1985 | "Love Don't Care (Whose Heart It Breaks)" | David Hogan |
| 1986 | "Once in a Blue Moon" | David Hogan |
| 1986 | "Too Many Times" (with Anita Pointer) | |
| 1991 | "Shadow of a Doubt" | Michael Salomon |
| 1991 | "Brotherly Love" (with Keith Whitley) | Jack Cole |
| 1998 | "Scared Money Never Wins" | Tom Bevins |
