= Greatest Hits, Volume II (Earl Thomas Conley album) =

Greatest hits album by Earl Thomas Conley
- Released: February 14, 1990
- Genre: Country
- Length: 38:11
- Label: RCA
- Producer: Nelson Larkin; Earl Thomas Conley; Emory Gordy Jr. Randy Scruggs

Earl Thomas Conley chronology
The Heart of It All (1988)	Greatest Hits, Volume II (1990)	Yours Truly (1991)

Singles from Greatest Hits, Volume II
- 1. "Bring Back Your Love to Me" Released: January 1990; 2. "Who's Gonna Tell Her Goodbye" Released: June 1990

Greatest Hits, Volume II is the second compilation album by American country music artist Earl Thomas Conley. It was released on February 14, 1990, via RCA Records. The album includes the singles "Bring Back Your Love to Me" and "Who's Gonna Tell Her Goodbye".

== Track listing ==
No.	Title	Writer(s)	Length
1.	"What She Is (Is a Woman in Love)"	Bob McDill, Paul Harrison	4:04
2.	"That Was a Close One"	Robert Byrne	4:25
3.	"Love Don't Care (Whose Heart It Breaks)"	Earl Thomas Conley, Randy Scruggs	3:29
4.	"Who's Gonna Tell Her Goodbye"	Bill Rice, Sharon Vaughn	3:33
5.	"Love Out Loud"	Thom Schuyler	3:48
6.	"I Can't Win for Losin' You"	Byrne, Rick Bowles	4:05
7.	"Bring Back Your Love to Me"	John Hiatt	3:46
8.	"What I'd Say"	Byrne, Will Robinson	3:52
9.	"Chance of Lovin' You"	Conley, Scruggs	2:57
10.	"You Must Not Be Drinking Enough"	Danny Kortchmar	4:11

== Chart performance ==
Chart (1990)	Peak position
US Top Country Albums (Billboard)	35
