= Greatest Hits (Earl Thomas Conley album) =

Greatest hits album by Earl Thomas Conley
- Released: September 30, 1985
- Genre: Country
- Length: 34:15
- Label: RCA Records
- Producer: Earl Thomas Conley; Nelson Larkin

Earl Thomas Conley chronology
Treadin' Water (1984)	Greatest Hits (1985)	Too Many Times (1986)

Singles from Greatest Hits
- 1. "Nobody Falls Like a Fool" Released: April 1983; 2. "Once in a Blue Moon" Released: January 27, 1986

Professional ratings
Review scores
Source	Rating
Allmusic	4/5 stars

Greatest Hits is the first compilation album by the American country music artist Earl Thomas Conley. It was released in September 1985 by RCA Records. The album peaked at number 1 on the Billboard Top Country Albums chart.

== Track listing ==
No.	Title	Writer(s)	Length
1.	"Nobody Falls Like a Fool"	Peter McCann, Mark Wright	3:23
2.	"Holding Her and Loving You"	Walt Aldridge, Tom Brasfield	3:11
3.	"Somewhere Between Right and Wrong"	Earl Thomas Conley	4:09
4.	"Angel in Disguise"	Conley, Randy Scruggs	3:56
5.	"Fire and Smoke"	Conley	3:13
6.	"Once in a Blue Moon"	Robert Byrne, Brasfield	3:37
7.	"I Have Loved You Girl (But Not Like This Before)"	Conley	2:37
8.	"Don't Make It Easy for Me"	Conley, Scruggs	3:32
9.	"Your Love's on the Line"	Conley, Scruggs	3:25
10.	"Silent Treatment"	Conley	3:12

== Charts ==
=== Weekly charts ===
Chart (1986)	Peak position
US Top Country Albums (Billboard)	1

=== Year-end charts ===
Chart (1986)	Position
US Top Country Albums (Billboard)	2
