= List of RPM number-one country singles of 1984 =

These are the Canadian number-one country songs of 1984, per the RPM Country Tracks chart.

Issue date	Title	Artist
January 14	Take It to the Limit	Waylon Jennings with Willie Nelson
January 21	You Look So Good in Love	George Strait
January 28	Ozark Mountain Jubilee	The Oak Ridge Boys
February 4	Slow Burn	T. G. Sheppard
February 11	Show Her	Ronnie Milsap
February 18	That's the Way Love Goes	Merle Haggard
February 25	Don't Cheat in Our Hometown	Ricky Skaggs
March 3	Two Car Garage	B. J. Thomas
March 10	Nothing Like Falling in Love	Eddie Rabbitt
March 17	Woke Up in Love	Exile
March 24	Going, Going, Gone	Lee Greenwood
March 31	Roll On (Eighteen Wheeler)	Alabama
April 7	Let's Stop Talkin' About It	Janie Fricke
April 14	You've Really Got a Hold on Me	Mickey Gilley
April 21	I've Been Wrong Before	Deborah Allen
April 28	Right or Wrong	George Strait
May 5	The Yellow Rose	Johnny Lee with Lane Brody
May 12	To All the Girls I've Loved Before	Willie Nelson with Julio Iglesias
May 19	To All the Girls I've Loved Before	Willie Nelson with Julio Iglesias
May 26	I Guess It Never Hurts to Hurt Sometimes	The Oak Ridge Boys
June 2	I Don't Wanna Lose Your Love	Crystal Gayle
June 9	Honey (Open That Door)	Ricky Skaggs
June 16	As Long As I'm Rockin' with You	John Conlee
June 23	I Got Mexico	Eddy Raven
June 30	Mona Lisa Lost Her Smile	David Allan Coe
July 7	Someday When Things Are Good	Merle Haggard
July 14	When We Make Love	Alabama
July 21	I Can Tell By the Way You Dance (You're Gonna Love Me Tonight)	Vern Gosdin
July 28	Just Another Woman in Love	Anne Murray
August 4	I Don't Want to Be a Memory	Exile
August 11	Angel in Disguise	Earl Thomas Conley
August 18	Mama He's Crazy	The Judds
August 25	That's the Thing About Love	Don Williams
September 1	Still Losing You	Ronnie Milsap
September 8	Tennessee Homesick Blues	Dolly Parton
September 15	Let's Fall to Pieces Together	George Strait
September 22	Only a Lonely Heart Knows	Barbara Mandrell
September 29	Tennessee Homesick Blues	Dolly Parton
October 6	Turning Away	Crystal Gayle
October 13	Uncle Pen	Ricky Skaggs
October 20	Everyday	The Oak Ridge Boys
October 27	I Don't Know a Thing About Love (The Moon Song)	Conway Twitty
November 3	If You're Gonna Play in Texas (You Gotta Have a Fiddle in the Band)	Alabama
November 10	City of New Orleans	Willie Nelson
November 17	I've Been Around Enough to Know	John Schneider
November 24	Nobody Loves Me Like You Do	Anne Murray with Dave Loggins
December 1	Give Me One More Chance	Exile
December 8	Your Heart's Not In It	Janie Fricke
December 15	Too Good to Stop Now	Mickey Gilley
December 22	Chance of Lovin' You	Earl Thomas Conley

== See also ==
- 1984 in music
- List of number-one country singles of 1984 (U.S.)
