= List of Hot Country Singles number ones of 1984 =

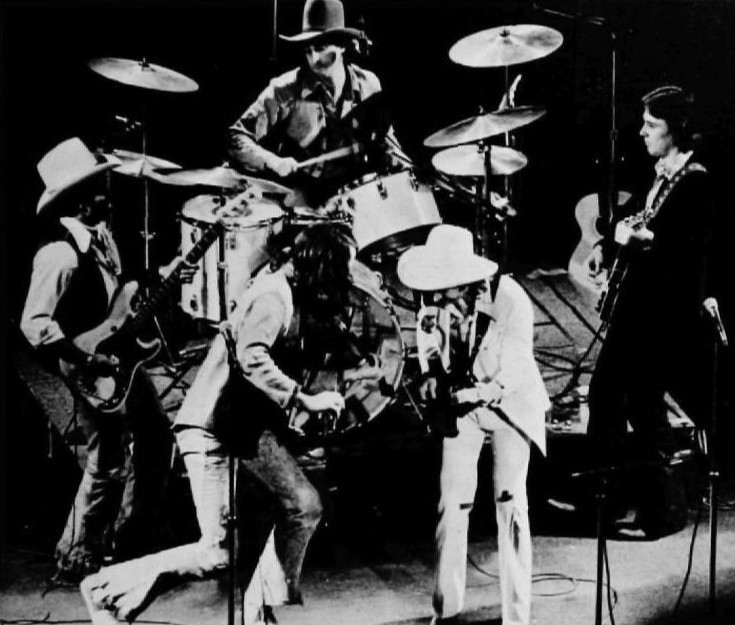
Having been active since the 1960s, the Nitty Gritty Dirt Band achieved its first number one single in 1984.

Hot Country Songs is a chart that ranks the top-performing country music songs in the United States, published by Billboard magazine. In 1984, 50 different singles topped the chart, then published under the title Hot Country Singles, in 52 issues of the magazine, based on playlists submitted by country music radio stations and sales reports submitted by stores.

Six acts tied for the most number ones in 1984, with three each: bands Alabama and Exile and soloists Earl Thomas Conley, Merle Haggard, Ricky Skaggs and George Strait. One of the only two songs to spend more than a single week at number one was a collaboration between Julio Iglesias and Willie Nelson. Iglesias had been successful in his native Spain and other Latin markets since the late 1960s, but his 1984 album 1100 Bel Air Place was his United States breakthrough. The album featured duets with American singers from a range of genres, and the first single to be taken from it, "To All the Girls I've Loved Before", paired Iglesias with veteran country singer Nelson. The song was a top 10 hit on the all-genres Billboard Hot 100 but went all the way to number one on the country chart. The only other multi-week chart-topper in 1984 was "Why Not Me" by mother-daughter duo The Judds, which ended the year at number one.

The Nitty Gritty Dirt Band had its first number one in 1984. The band had been active since the 1960s and released a number of acclaimed albums in the 1970s before shortening its name to simply Dirt Band and taking a mainstream pop music approach. Soon after reverting to its original name and switching back to country music, the band finally achieved its first Hot Country chart-topper with "Long Hard Road (The Sharecropper's Dream)". Another act to reach number one for the first time in 1984 after a lengthy chart career was Eddy Raven, who claimed the top spot in June with "I Got Mexico", more than ten years after his first appearance on the Hot Country Singles chart in early 1974. He would go on to have a total of six number one singles before his success tailed off in the late 1980s. Exile also topped the country chart for the first time in 1984; the band had topped the Hot 100 six years earlier for four weeks with the disco-influenced pop track "Kiss You All Over", but went on to achieve much greater success after a shift to the country genre in the early 1980s.

== Chart history ==
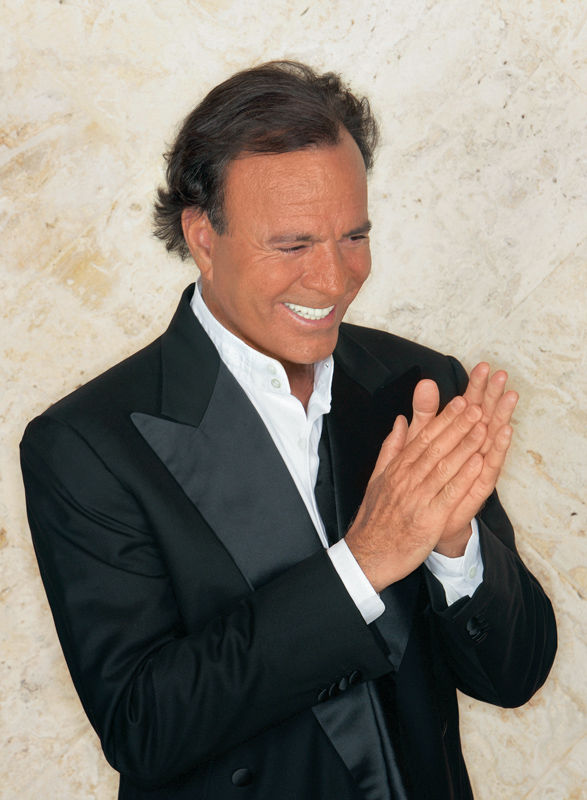
Although primarily associated with Latin music, Spanish singer Julio Iglesias had a country number one in 1984 collaborating with Willie Nelson.

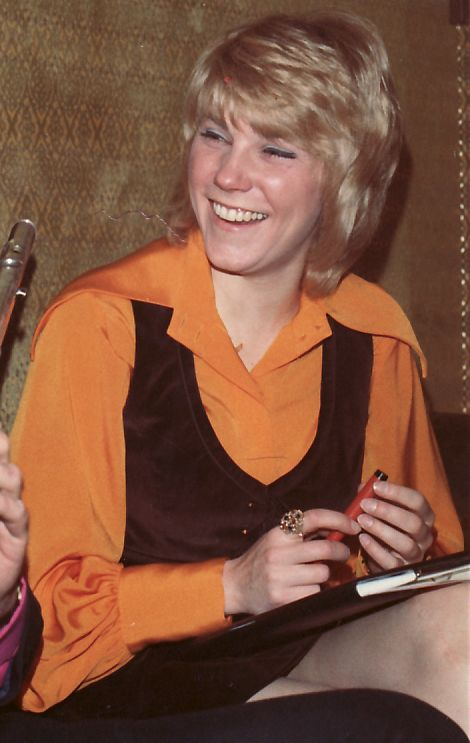
Canadian singer Anne Murray had two chart-toppers in 1984.

Johnny Lee was another act to top the chart twice during the year.

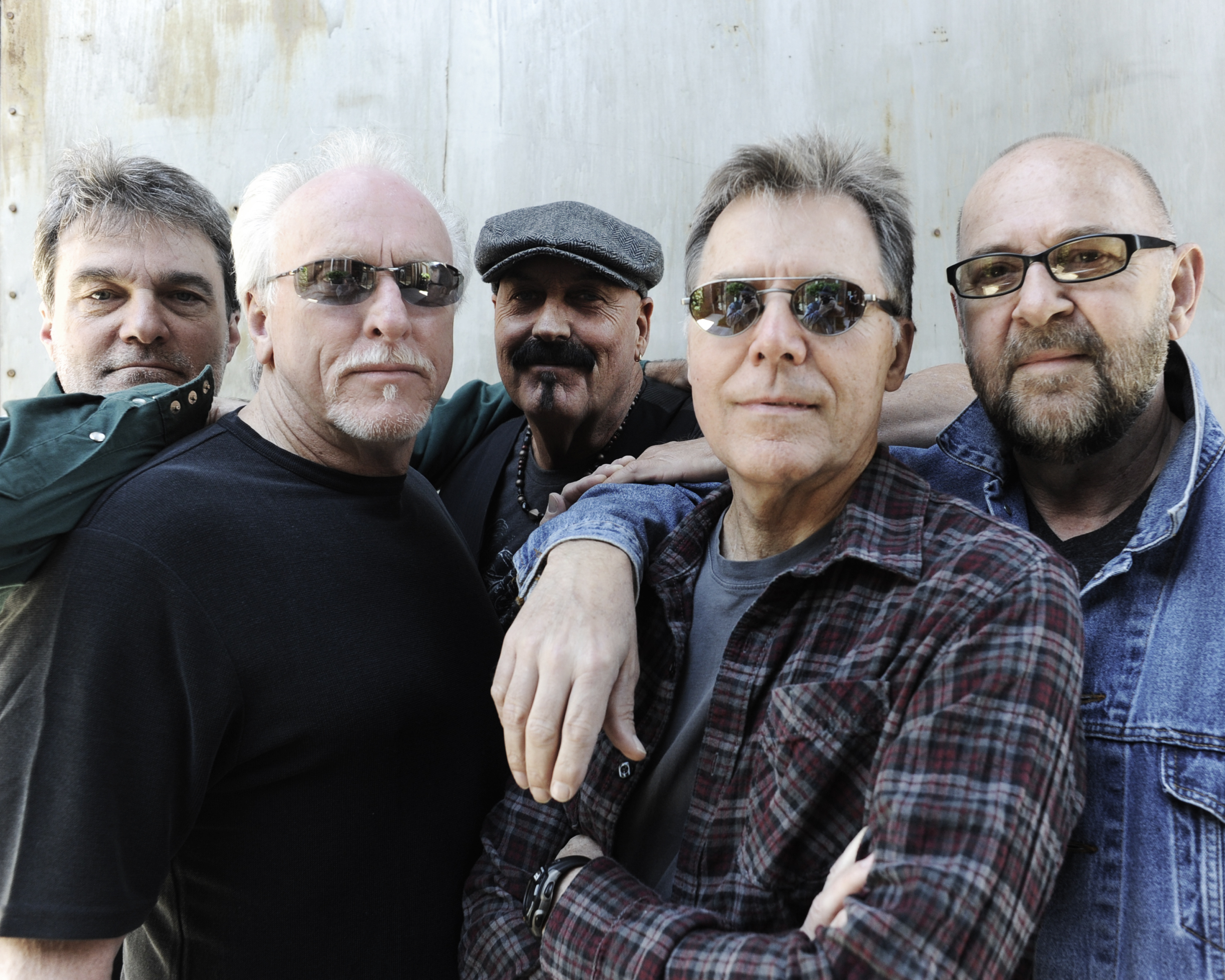
Exile had their first number-one country single in 1984, and would go on to have three by year's end. The band had previously had a number-one pop hit in 1978 with "Kiss You All Over" before shifting to country in the 1980s.

Issue date	Title	Artist(s)	Ref.
January 7	"You Look So Good in Love"	George Strait	
January 14	"Slow Burn"	T. G. Sheppard	
January 21	"In My Eyes"	John Conlee	
January 28	"The Sound of Goodbye"	Crystal Gayle	
February 4	"Show Her"	Ronnie Milsap	
February 11	"That's the Way Love Goes"	Merle Haggard	
February 18	"Don't Cheat in Our Hometown"	Ricky Skaggs	
February 25	"Stay Young"	Don Williams	
March 3	"Woke Up in Love"	Exile	
March 10	"Going, Going, Gone"	Lee Greenwood	
March 17	"Elizabeth"	The Statler Brothers	
March 24	"Roll On (Eighteen Wheeler)"	Alabama	
March 31	"Let's Stop Talkin' About It"	Janie Fricke	
April 7	"Don't Make It Easy for Me"	Earl Thomas Conley	
April 14	"Thank God for the Radio"	The Kendalls	
April 21	"The Yellow Rose"	Johnny Lee and Lane Brody	
April 28	"Right or Wrong"	George Strait	
May 5	"I Guess It Never Hurts to Hurt Sometimes"	The Oak Ridge Boys	
May 12	"To All the Girls I've Loved Before"	Julio Iglesias and Willie Nelson	
May 19	"To All the Girls I've Loved Before"	Julio Iglesias and Willie Nelson	
May 26	"As Long as I'm Rockin' with You"	John Conlee	
June 2	"Honey (Open That Door)"	Ricky Skaggs	
June 9	"Someday When Things Are Good"	Merle Haggard	
June 16	"I Got Mexico"	Eddy Raven	
June 23	"When We Make Love"	Alabama	
June 30	"I Can Tell by the Way You Dance (You're Gonna Love Me Tonight)"	Vern Gosdin	
July 7	"Somebody's Needin' Somebody"	Conway Twitty	
July 14	"I Don't Want to Be a Memory"	Exile	
July 21	"Just Another Woman in Love"	Anne Murray	
July 28	"Angel in Disguise"	Earl Thomas Conley	
August 4	"Mama He's Crazy"	The Judds	
August 11	"That's the Thing About Love"	Don Williams	
August 18	"Still Losing You"	Ronnie Milsap	
August 25	"Long Hard Road (The Sharecropper's Dream)"	Nitty Gritty Dirt Band	
September 1	"Let's Fall to Pieces Together"	George Strait	
September 8	"Tennessee Homesick Blues"	Dolly Parton	
September 15	"You're Gettin' to Me Again"	Jim Glaser	
September 22	"Let's Chase Each Other Around the Room"	Merle Haggard	
September 29	"Turning Away"	Crystal Gayle	
October 6	"Everyday"	The Oak Ridge Boys	
October 13	"Uncle Pen"	Ricky Skaggs	
October 20	"I Don't Know a Thing About Love (The Moon Song)"	Conway Twitty	
October 27	"If You're Gonna Play in Texas (You Gotta Have a Fiddle in the Band)"	Alabama	
November 3	"City of New Orleans"	Willie Nelson	
November 10	"I've Been Around Enough to Know"	John Schneider	
November 17	"Give Me One More Chance"	Exile	
November 24	"You Could've Heard a Heart Break"	Johnny Lee	
December 1	"Your Heart's Not in It"	Janie Fricke	
December 8	"Chance of Lovin' You"	Earl Thomas Conley	
December 15	"Nobody Loves Me Like You Do"	Anne Murray and Dave Loggins	
December 22	"Why Not Me"	The Judds	
December 29	"Why Not Me"	The Judds	

== See also ==
- 1984 in music
- List of artists who reached number one on the U.S. country chart
