= List of Hot Country Singles number ones of 1987 =

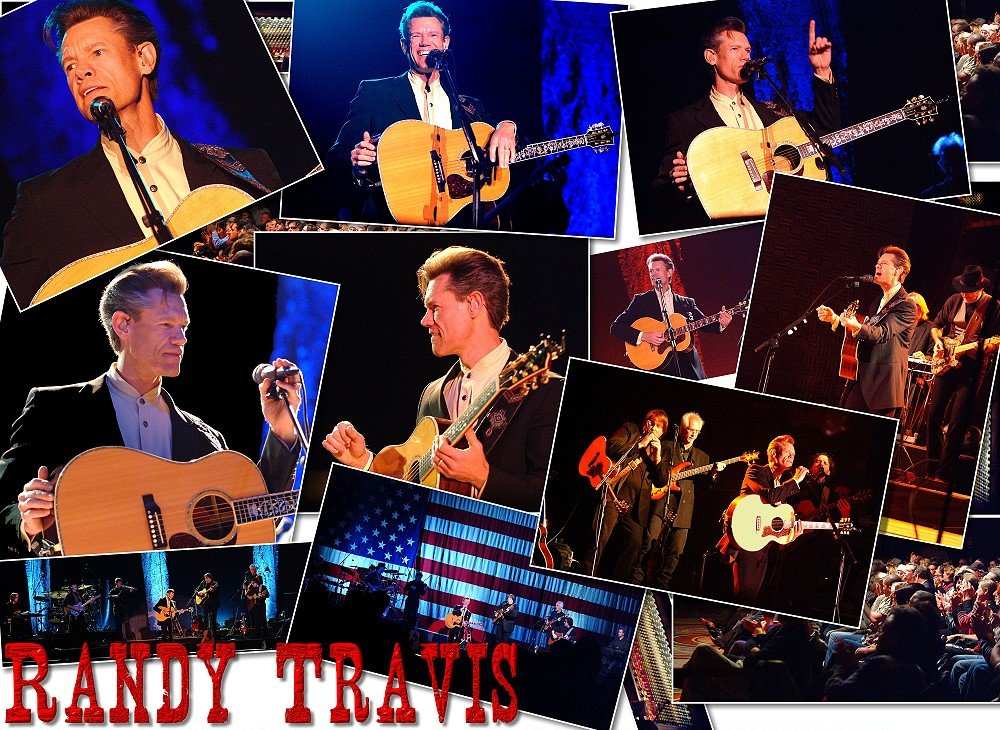
Randy Travis spent three weeks at number one with "Forever and Ever, Amen".

Hot Country Songs is a chart that ranks the top-performing country music songs in the United States, published by Billboard magazine. In 1987, 50 different songs topped the chart, then published under the title Hot Country Singles, in 52 issues of the magazine, based on playlists submitted by country music radio stations and sales reports submitted by stores.

At the start of the year, the song at the top of the charts was "Mind Your Own Business" by Hank Williams Jr. The single had moved into the number one position in the issue of Billboard dated December 27, 1986 and remained in place for a second week in the issue dated January 3. The final number one of the year was "Somewhere Tonight" by Highway 101, which began a two-week run at the top in the issue dated December 26, 1987. Between those two chart-toppers, the only song to spend more than one week at number one was "Forever and Ever, Amen" by Randy Travis, which had a three-week run in the peak position during the summer. The song won both the Grammy Award for Best Country Song and the Academy of Country Music award for Song of the Year.

Seven artists each achieved three number ones in 1987: Reba McEntire, Dan Seals, Earl Thomas Conley, George Strait, Steve Wariner, the Judds, and Ronnie Milsap, one of whose chart-toppers was a collaboration with Kenny Rogers. In addition to her three credited number ones, McEntire was also one of four featured vocalists on Hank Williams Jr's "Mind Your Own Business", none of whom were listed on the chart. Acts to reach number one for the first time included S-K-O and the O'Kanes, both of whom topped the chart for the first and only time in 1987. Michael Johnson had two number ones in the first half of the year, the first of which, "Give Me Wings", was named by Billboard as the top country single of the year. These would prove to be his only appearances at the top of the chart, however. At the other end of the scale, Milsap took his count of Hot Country number ones past 30, as he continued a run of ten number ones achieved between 1985 and 1989. Only Merle Haggard (38), Conway Twitty (40) and George Strait (44) have taken more songs to the top of the Hot Country chart than Milsap since Billboard began compiling sales and airplay into a single listing in 1958. Other veteran acts to appear at the top of the chart in 1987 included the Oak Ridge Boys, who achieved their fourteenth and fifteenth number ones, but their last to feature vocalist William Lee Golden, who was expelled from the group after more than 20 years during 1987. Crystal Gayle, one of the most successful chart acts of the preceding ten years, reached number one for the eighteenth and final time with "Straight to the Heart".

== Chart history ==
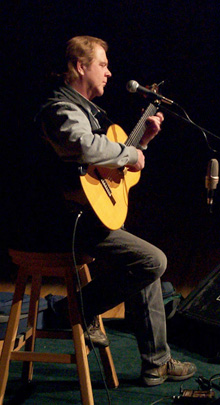
Michael Johnson achieved his only two number ones in 1987.

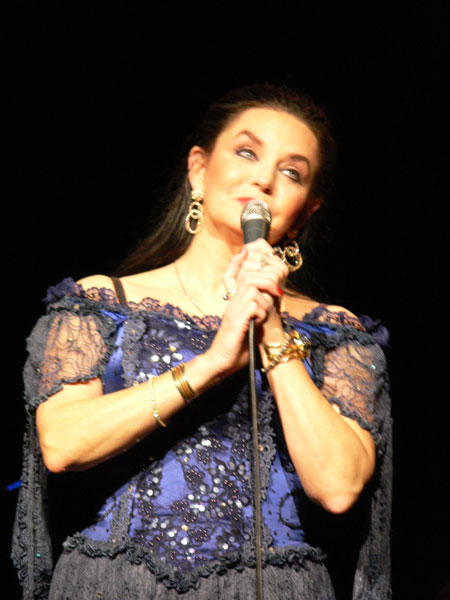
Crystal Gayle topped the chart for the 18th and final time with "Straight to the Heart".

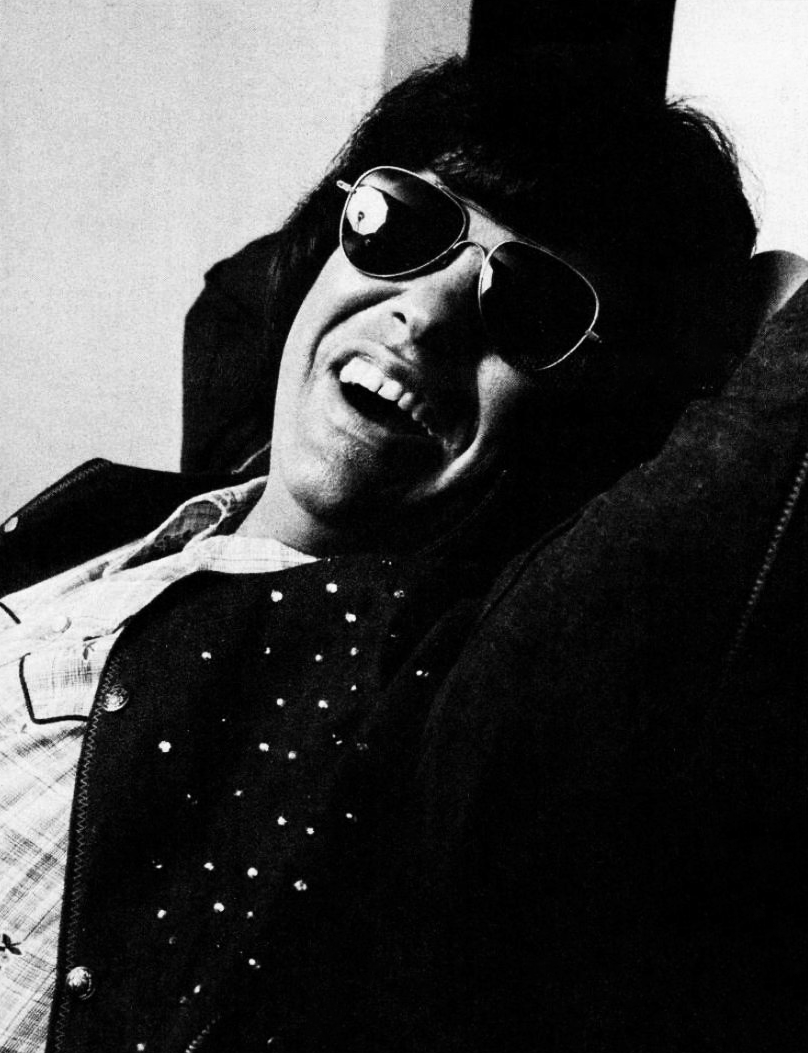
Ronnie Milsap achieved three number ones in 1987, including a collaboration with Kenny Rogers.

Issue date	Title	Artist(s)	Ref.
January 3	"Mind Your Own Business"	Hank Williams Jr.	
January 10	"Give Me Wings"	Michael Johnson	
January 17	"What Am I Gonna Do About You"	Reba McEntire	
January 24	"Cry Myself to Sleep"	The Judds	
January 31	"You Still Move Me"	Dan Seals	
February 7	"Leave Me Lonely"	Gary Morris	
February 14	"How Do I Turn You On"	Ronnie Milsap	
February 21	"Straight to the Heart"	Crystal Gayle	
February 28	"I Can't Win for Losin' You"	Earl Thomas Conley	
March 7	"Mornin' Ride"	Lee Greenwood	
March 14	"Baby's Got a New Baby"	S-K-O	
March 21	"I'll Still Be Loving You"	Restless Heart	
March 28	"Small Town Girl"	Steve Wariner	
April 4	"Ocean Front Property"	George Strait	
April 11	""You've Got" the Touch"	Alabama	
April 18	"Kids of the Baby Boom"	The Bellamy Brothers	
April 25	"Rose in Paradise"	Waylon Jennings	
May 2	"Don't Go to Strangers"	T. Graham Brown	
May 9	"The Moon Is Still Over Her Shoulder"	Michael Johnson	
May 16	"To Know Him Is to Love Him"	Dolly Parton, Linda Ronstadt, Emmylou Harris	
May 23	"Can't Stop My Heart from Loving You"	The O'Kanes	
May 30	"It Takes a Little Rain (To Make Love Grow)"	The Oak Ridge Boys	
June 6	"I Will Be There"	Dan Seals	
June 13	"Forever and Ever, Amen"	Randy Travis	
June 20	"Forever and Ever, Amen"	Randy Travis	
June 27	"Forever and Ever, Amen"	Randy Travis	
July 4	"That Was a Close One"	Earl Thomas Conley	
July 11	"All My Ex's Live in Texas"	George Strait	
July 18	"I Know Where I'm Going"	The Judds	
July 25	"The Weekend"	Steve Wariner	
August 1	"Snap Your Fingers"	Ronnie Milsap	
August 8	"One Promise Too Late"	Reba McEntire	
August 15	"A Long Line of Love"	Michael Martin Murphey	
August 22	"Why Does It Have to Be (Wrong or Right)"	Restless Heart	
August 29	"Born to Boogie"	Hank Williams Jr.	
September 5	"She's Too Good to Be True"	Exile	
September 12	"Make No Mistake, She's Mine"	Kenny Rogers & Ronnie Milsap	
September 19	"This Crazy Love"	The Oak Ridge Boys	
September 26	"Three Time Loser"	Dan Seals	
October 3	"You Again"	The Forester Sisters	
October 10	"The Way We Make a Broken Heart"	Rosanne Cash	
October 17	"Fishin' in the Dark"	Nitty Gritty Dirt Band	
October 24	"Shine, Shine, Shine"	Eddy Raven	
October 31	"Right from the Start"	Earl Thomas Conley	
November 7	"Am I Blue"	George Strait	
November 14	"Maybe Your Baby's Got the Blues"	The Judds	
November 21	"I Won't Need You Anymore (Always and Forever)"	Randy Travis	
November 28	"Lynda"	Steve Wariner	
December 5	"Somebody Lied"	Ricky Van Shelton	
December 12	"The Last One to Know"	Reba McEntire	
December 19	"Do Ya"	K. T. Oslin	
December 26	"Somewhere Tonight"	Highway 101	

== See also ==
- 1987 in music
- List of artists who reached number one on the U.S. country chart
