= List of RPM number-one country singles of 1987 =

These are the Canadian number-one country songs of 1987, per the RPM Country Tracks chart.

Issue date	Title	Artist
January 17	Mind Your Own Business	Hank Williams, Jr. featuring Reba McEntire, Tom Petty, Reverend Ike, & Willie Nelson
January 24	What Am I Gonna Do About You	Reba McEntire
January 31	The Carpenter	John Conlee
February 7	You Still Move Me	Dan Seals
February 14	Leave Me Lonely	Gary Morris
February 21	How Do I Turn You On	Ronnie Milsap
February 28	I'll Come Back as Another Woman	Tanya Tucker
March 7	No Place Like Home	Randy Travis
March 14	No Place Like Home	Randy Travis
March 21	Mornin' Ride	Lee Greenwood
March 28	Small Town Girl	Steve Wariner
April 4	I'll Still Be Loving You	Restless Heart
April 11	Ocean Front Property	George Strait
April 18	Ocean Front Property	George Strait
April 25	'You've Got' The Touch	Alabama
May 2	Rose in Paradise	Waylon Jennings
May 9	Don't Go to Strangers	T. Graham Brown
May 16	To Know Him Is to Love Him	Emmylou Harris, Linda Ronstadt, and Dolly Parton
May 23	To Know Him Is to Love Him	Emmylou Harris, Linda Ronstadt, and Dolly Parton
May 30	Can't Stop My Heart From Loving You	The O'Kanes
June 6	It Takes a Little Rain (To Make Love Grow)	The Oak Ridge Boys
June 13	I Will Be There	Dan Seals
June 20	Forever and Ever, Amen	Randy Travis
June 27	Forever and Ever, Amen	Randy Travis
July 4	Forever and Ever, Amen	Randy Travis
July 11	Forever and Ever, Amen	Randy Travis
July 18	All My Ex's Live in Texas	George Strait
July 25	I'm Know Where I'm Going	The Judds
August 1	The Weekend	Steve Wariner
August 8	Snap Your Fingers	Ronnie Milsap
August 15	One Promise Too Late	Reba McEntire
August 22	A Long Line of Love	Michael Martin Murphey
August 29	Whiskey, If You Were a Woman	Highway 101
September 5	Why Does It Have to Be (Wrong or Right)	Restless Heart
September 12	Born to Boogie	Hank Williams, Jr.
September 19	She's Too Good to Be True	Exile
September 26	Make No Mistake, She's Mine	Kenny Rogers and Ronnie Milsap
October 3	Three Time Loser	Dan Seals
October 10	The Way We Make a Broken Heart	Rosanne Cash
October 17	Fishin' in the Dark	The Nitty Gritty Dirt Band
October 24	Little Ways	Dwight Yoakam
October 31	Shine, Shine, Shine	Eddy Raven
November 7	Maybe Your Baby's Got the Blues	The Judds
November 14	Right From the Start	Earl Thomas Conley
November 21	Am I Blue	George Strait
November 28	I Won't Need You Anymore (Always and Forever)	Randy Travis
December 5	Try	Blue Rodeo
December 12	Lynda	Steve Wariner
December 19	Those Memories of You	Emmylou Harris, Linda Ronstadt, and Dolly Parton
December 26	Those Memories of You	Emmylou Harris, Linda Ronstadt, and Dolly Parton

== See also ==
- 1987 in music
- List of number-one country hits of 1987 (U.S.)
