= Too Many Times =

Too Many Times may refer to:

- Too Many Times (album), a 1986 album by Earl Thomas Conley
- "Too Many Times" (Mental As Anything song)
- "Too Many Times" (Sister2Sister song)
- "Too Many Times" (Earl Thomas Conley and Anita Pointer song)
- "Too Many Times", a single by Kai Tracid, 2001
