= Bring Back Your Love to Me =

Single by Earl Thomas Conley

from the album Greatest Hits, Volume II
- B-side: "Chance of Lovin' You"
- Released: January 1990
- Genre: Country
- Length: 3:50
- Label: RCA
- Songwriter: John Hiatt
- Producers: Randy Scruggs, Earl Thomas Conley

Earl Thomas Conley singles chronology
| "You Must Not Be Drinking Enough" (1989) | "Bring Back Your Love to Me" (1990) | "Who's Gonna Tell Her Goodbye" (1990) |

"Bring Back Your Love to Me" is a song written and later recorded by John Hiatt for his 1990 studio album Stolen Moments. However, the song was initially recorded earlier in 1990 by American country music artist Earl Thomas Conley, and was issued several months before Hiatt's version. Released as the first single from Conley's Greatest Hits, Volume II compilation album, the song reached number 11 on the Billboard Hot Country Singles & Tracks chart in May 1990. Hiatt's version was issued in June.

== Chart performance ==
| Chart (1990) | Peak position |
|---|---|
| Canada Country Singles (RPM) | 11 |
| US Hot Country Songs (Billboard) | 11 |
