= Smoke and Fire =

Smoke and Fire or Fire and Smoke, alluding to the saying where there's smoke, there's fire, may refer to:

- "Smoke and Fire" (Sabrina Carpenter song), a 2016 single by Sabrina Carpenter
- "Smoke and Fire", a song by Screaming Lord Sutch from his 1969 album Lord Sutch and Heavy Friends
- "Smoke and Fire", a 2013 single by Blair Joscelyne
- "Smoke and Fire", a 2022 single by Låpsley off the album Cautionary Tales of Youth
- "Fire and Smoke", a 1981 song by Earl Thomas Conley, the title track off the eponymous album Fire & Smoke
- Fire & Smoke, a 1981 album by Earl Thomas Conley, featuring the eponymous title track "Fire and Smoke"

== See also ==
- The dictionary definition of where there's smoke, there's fire at Wiktionary
- Smoke or Fire, an American punk band
- "No Smoke Without a Fire", a 1989 song by Bad Company off the album Dangerous Age
- No Smoke Without Fire, a 1972 album by Wishbone Ash
- Fire (disambiguation)
- Smoke (disambiguation)
- Fire and Ash (disambiguation)
