= Somewhere Between Right and Wrong =

Somewhere Between Right and Wrong may refer to:

- Somewhere Between Right and Wrong (song), a 1982 song by Earl Thomas Conley
- Somewhere Between Right and Wrong (album), a 1982 album by Earl Thomas Conley
