= Hard Days and Honky Tonk Nights =

Single by Earl Thomas Conley

from the album Yours Truly
- B-side: "Borrowed Money"
- Released: January 11, 1992
- Genre: Country
- Length: 2:37
- Label: RCA
- Songwriter(s): Earl Thomas Conley, Randy Scruggs
- Producer(s): Larry Michael Lee, Josh Leo

Earl Thomas Conley singles chronology
"Brotherly Love" (1991)	"Hard Days and Honky Tonk Nights" (1992)	"If Only Your Eyes Could Lie" (1992)

"Hard Days and Honky Tonk Nights" is a song co-written and recorded by American country music artist Earl Thomas Conley. It was released in January 1992 as the third single from the album Yours Truly. The song reached #36 on the Billboard Hot Country Singles & Tracks chart. The song was written by Conley and Randy Scruggs.

== Chart performance ==
Chart (1992)	Peak position
US Hot Country Songs (Billboard)	36
Canadian RPM Country Tracks	38
