= Don't Cheat in Our Hometown (album) =

Studio album by Ricky Skaggs
- Released: 1983
- Studios: Audio Media Recorders (Nashville, Tennessee); Scruggs Sound (Berry Hill, Tennessee); Enactron Truck (North Hollywood, California)
- Genre: Country
- Length: 31:11
- Labels: Epic, Sugar Hill
- Producer: Ricky Skaggs

Ricky Skaggs chronology
Highways & Heartaches (1982)	Don't Cheat in Our Hometown (1983)	Country Boy (1984)

Singles from Don't Cheat in Our Hometown
- 1. "Don't Cheat in Our Hometown" Released: November 1983; 2. "Honey (Open That Door)" Released: February 1984; 3. "Uncle Pen" Released: June 1984

Professional ratings
Review scores
Source	Rating
Allmusic	3/5 stars

Don't Cheat in Our Hometown is the sixth studio album by American country music artist Ricky Skaggs. It was released in 1983 via Epic Records. The album peaked at number 1 on the Billboard Top Country Albums chart. It features guitar work from Albert Lee on five of the album's ten tracks and Dolly Parton harmonizes vocals on "A Vision Of Mother" and "Don't Step Over an Old Love".

== Track listing ==
No.	Title	Writer(s)	Length
1.	"Don't Cheat in Our Hometown"	Ray Pennington, Roy Marcum	3:17
2.	"Honey (Open That Door)"	Mel Tillis	3:28
3.	"A Wound Time Can't Erase"	Bill D. Johnson	3:40
4.	"A Vision of Mother"	Carter Stanley, Ralph Stanley	3:19
5.	"Uncle Pen"	Bill Monroe	2:23
6.	"I'm Head Over Heels in Love"	Lester Flatt	3:41
7.	"Don't Step Over an Old Love"	Fred Stryker	3:34
8.	"She's More to Be Pitied"	Ruby Rakes	2:48
9.	"Keep a Memory"	C. Stanley	2:36
10.	"Children Go Where I Send Thee"	Traditional	2:25

== Personnel ==
- Ricky Skaggs – lead vocals, acoustic guitar, backing vocals (1, 2, 8, 9), fiddle (1, 4, 7–9), harmony vocals (3–5, 7), mandolin (4, 7, 9), arrangements (10)
- Glen Hardin – acoustic piano (1, 2, 7, 8)
- Buck White – acoustic piano fills (2, 3), acoustic piano solo (2), bass vocals (10)
- Mickey Merrit – acoustic piano (3, 5)
- Albert Lee – electric guitar (1, 7, 8), electric lead guitar (2, 6), acoustic piano (6)
- Ray Flacke – electric guitar (3, 5)
- Brian Ahern – S-400 guitar (4, 9), acoustic guitar (6), electric guitar (6)
- Hank DeVito – steel guitar (1, 7, 8), electric rhythm guitar (2)
- Bruce Bouton – steel guitar (3, 5)
- Lou Reid – banjo (5), harmony vocals (5)
- Marc Pruett – banjo (9)
- Jerry Douglas – dobro (9)
- Emory Gordy, Jr. – bass (1, 2, 4, 6–9)
- Jesse Chambers – bass (3, 5)
- Ernie Ball – bass (4, 6, 9)
- John Ware – drums (1, 2, 6–8)
- George Grantham – drums (3, 5)
- Bobby Hicks – fiddle (3, 5)
- Bobby Hardin – backing vocals (2)
- Cheryl White-Warren – backing vocals (2), harmony vocals (10)
- Sharon White-Skaggs – backing vocals (2), harmony vocals (10)
- Dolly Parton – harmony vocals (4, 7)

== Production ==
- Ricky Skaggs – producer
- Donivan Cowart – engineer
- Marshall Morgan – engineer, mixing
- Steve Scruggs – engineer
- Hollis Halford – assistant engineer
- Pat McMakin – assistant engineer
- Glenn Meadows – mastering at Masterfonics (Nashville, Tennessee)
- Virginia Team – art direction
- Jeff Morris – design
- Jim "Señior" McGuire – photography
- Chip Peay Enterprises – management

== Chart performance ==
Chart (1983)	Peak position
Canadian RPM Country Albums	1
Canadian RPM Top Albums	87
US Top Country Albums (Billboard)	1
