= Nobody Falls Like a Fool =

Single by Earl Thomas Conley

from the album Greatest Hits
- B-side: "Silent Treatment"
- Released: September 2, 1985
- Genre: Country
- Length: 3:23
- Label: RCA
- Songwriters: Peter McCann; Mark Wright
- Producers: Earl Thomas Conley; Nelson Larkin

Earl Thomas Conley singles chronology
"Love Don't Care (Whose Heart It Breaks)" (1985)	"Nobody Falls Like a Fool" (1985)	"Once in a Blue Moon" (1986)

"Nobody Falls Like a Fool" is a song written by Peter McCann and Mark Wright, and recorded by American country music artist Earl Thomas Conley. It was released in September 1985 as the lead single from his Greatest Hits compilation album. The song was Conley's tenth number one on the country chart. The single went to number one from December 14, 1985 on Billboard Hot Country Singles number-one single and from December 28, 1985 RPM Country Tracks number on both for one week and spent a total of fifteen weeks on the country chart.

== Chart performance ==
Chart (1985)	Peak position
US Hot Country Songs (Billboard)	1
Canadian RPM Country Tracks	1
