= We Believe in Happy Endings =

Single by Johnny Rodriguez

from the album Just for You
- B-side: "The Immigrant"
- Released: February 25, 1978
- Genre: Country
- Label: Mercury
- Songwriter(s): Bob McDill
- Producer(s): Jerry Kennedy

Johnny Rodriguez singles chronology
"Savin' This Love Song for You" (1977)	"We Believe in Happy Endings" (1978)	"Cuando Caliente El Sol (Love Me with All Your Heart)" (1978)

"We Believe in Happy Endings" is a song written by Bob McDill and recorded by American country music artist Johnny Rodriguez. It was released in September 1978 as the second single from the album Just for You. The single went to number seven on the Billboard Hot Country Singles & Tracks chart.

== Johnny Rodriguez version ==
=== Chart performance ===
Chart (1978)	Peak position
US Hot Country Songs (Billboard)	7
Canadian RPM Country Tracks	12

== Earl Thomas Conley with Emmylou Harris version ==
"We Believe in Happy Endings"

Single by Earl Thomas Conley with Emmylou Harris

from the album The Heart of It All
- B-side: "No Chance No Dance"
- Released: June 27, 1988
- Genre: Country
- Length: 3:36
- Label: RCA
- Songwriter(s): Bob McDill
- Producer(s): Emory Gordy Jr., Randy Scruggs

Earl Thomas Conley singles chronology
"What She Is (Is a Woman in Love)" (1988)	"We Believe in Happy Endings" (1988)	"What I'd Say" (1988)

Emmylou Harris singles chronology
"Wildflowers" (1988)	"We Believe in Happy Endings" (1988)	"Heartbreak Hill" (1988)

The song was also recorded by American country music artist Earl Thomas Conley with Emmylou Harris as a duet. It was released in June 1988 as the second single from Conley's album The Heart of It All. The song was the only collaboration of Conley and Harris to make the country chart. The single went to number one for one week on the country chart and spent a total of fifteen weeks on the chart. Their performance earned Harris and Conley a nomination for the Grammy Award for Best Country Collaboration with Vocals. It was also Harris's final country number one.

=== Chart performance ===
"We Believe in Happy Endings" debuted on the U.S. Billboard Hot Country Singles for the week of July 2, 1988.

==== Weekly charts ====
Chart (1988)	Peak position
US Hot Country Songs (Billboard)	1
Canadian RPM Country Tracks	1

==== Year-end charts ====
Chart (1988)	Position
US Hot Country Songs (Billboard)	13
