= Treadin' Water =

Studio album by Earl Thomas Conley
- Released: October 1, 1984
- Studio: Scruggs Sound Studio, Nashville, TN
- Genre: Country
- Length: 32:08
- Label: RCA
- Producer: Nelson Larkin, Earl Thomas Conley

Earl Thomas Conley chronology
Don't Make It Easy for Me (1983)	Treadin' Water (1984)	Greatest Hits (1985)

Singles from Treadin' Water
- 1. "Chance of Lovin' You" Released: August 27, 1984; 2. "Honor Bound" Released: January 6, 1985; 3. "Love Don't Care (Whose Heart It Breaks)" Released: April 29, 1985

Treadin' Water is the fifth studio album by American country music artist Earl Thomas Conley. It was released on October 1, 1984 via RCA Records. The album includes the singles "Chance of Lovin' You", "Love Don't Care (Whose Heart It Breaks)" and "Honor Bound".

== Track listing ==
No.	Title	Writer(s)	Length
1.	"Too Hot to Handle"	Earl Thomas Conley, Randy Scruggs	2:52
2.	"Love Don't Care (Whose Heart It Breaks)"	Conley, Scruggs	3:29
3.	"Labor of Love"	Conley, Scruggs	3:48
4.	"Your Love Says All There Is"	Conley, Scruggs	3:25
5.	"Love's on the Move Again"	Conley, Scruggs	2:59
6.	"Chance of Lovin' You"	Conley, Scruggs	2:55
7.	"Honor Bound"	Tommy Rocco, Charlie Black, Austin Roberts	3:16
8.	"Treadin' Water"	Conley	3:19
9.	"Feels Like a Saturday Night"	Conley, Scruggs	3:36
10.	"Turn This Bus Around (Bad Bob's)"	Conley	2:29

== Personnel ==
- Guitar: Shannon Fontaine, Kyle Frederick, Randy Scruggs
- Bass: Joe Osborn, J. D. Williamson
- Keyboards: Tommy Montgomery, Ron Oates, Steve Scruggs
- Drums: Jerry Carrigan, Jerry Kroon, Mel Watts
- Saxophone: Jim Horn
- Backing Vocals: Fred Conley, Fred Stark, Dennis Wilson

== Chart performance ==
Chart (1984)	Peak position
US Top Country Albums (Billboard)	2
