= Yours Truly (Earl Thomas Conley album) =

Studio album by Earl Thomas Conley
- Released: July 9, 1991
- Genre: Country
- Length: 34:29
- Label: RCA Records
- Producer: Larry Michael Lee (tracks 1, 3–5, 10); Josh Leo (tracks 1, 3–5, 10); Blake Mevis (track 2); Garth Fundis (track 2); Richard Landis (tracks 6–9)

Earl Thomas Conley chronology
The Heart of It All (1988)	Yours Truly (1991)	Perpetual Emotion (1998)

Singles from Yours Truly
- 1. "Shadow of a Doubt" Released: May 20, 1991; 2. "Brotherly Love" Released: August 26, 1991; 3. "Hard Days and Honky Tonk Nights" Released: January 11, 1992; 4. "If Only Your Eyes Could Lie" Released: May 1992

Yours Truly is the eighth studio album by American country music artist Earl Thomas Conley. It was released on July 9, 1991, by RCA Records. It was Conley's final album for RCA and his final to chart (it peaked at No. 53 on the country albums chart in the US). "Shadow of a Doubt" was the first single released from the album and went to No. 8 on the Billboard Hot Country Singles chart on August 23, 1991. The second release, "Brotherly Love" peaked at No. 2 on the country singles chart on November 15, 1991.

== Critical reception ==
Professional ratings
Review scores
Source	Rating
AllMusic	4/5 stars
My Kind of Country	A

Thom Owens of AllMusic writes, "Yours Truly is one of Earl Thomas Conley's finest efforts, boasting a consistently impressive set of songs and wonderful vocals from Conley."

Jonathan Pappalardo of My Kind of Country grades this album and "A" and concludes his article with, "Yours Truly is an excellent album, which to my ears, has aged remarkably well. I love seeing artists with a somewhat updated sound and Conley shines here. “Brotherly Love” is the standout track and well deserved big hit. Go to YouTube and stream everything else. You won't be disappointed."

== Track listing ==
No.	Title	Writer(s)	Length
1.	"You Got Me Now"	Will Robinson; Robert Byrne	3:30
2.	"Brotherly Love" (duet with Keith Whitley)	Tim Nichols; Jimmy Alan Stewart	3:14
3.	"One of Those Days"	Earl Thomas Conley; Byrne	4:04
4.	"Hard Days and Honky Tonk Nights"	Conley; Randy Scruggs	2:34
5.	"Keep My Heart in Line"	Conley; Scruggs	3:27
6.	"If Only Your Eyes Could Lie"	Bob McDill; John Jarrard	4:04
7.	"The Perfect Picture (To Fit My Frame Of Mind)"	McDill; Bucky Jones	3:19
8.	"Borrowed Money"	Conley; Wade Kirby	3:39
9.	"Shadow of a Doubt"	Tom Wopat; Byrne	2:58
10.	"I Wanna Be Loved Back"	Conley; Scruggs	3:40
Total length:			34:29

Track information and credits adapted from the album's liner notes.

== Personnel ==
Adapted from liner notes.

=== Tracks 1, 3–5, 10 ===
- Richard Bennett - acoustic guitar, electric guitar
- Robert Byrne - background vocals (tracks 1, 3)
- Larry Byrom - acoustic guitar, electric guitar, slide acoustic guitar, background vocals (track 10)
- Earl Thomas Conley - lead vocals
- Bill Cuomo - keyboards
- Jerry Douglas - dobro (track 5)
- Jimmie Fadden - harmonica (track 5)
- David Hungate - bass guitar
- Bernie Leadon - banjo, mandolin
- Larry Michael Lee - background vocals (track 10)
- Josh Leo - acoustic guitar, electric guitar
- Carl Marsh - keyboards
- Jim Photoglo - background vocals (tracks 4, 5)
- Russell Smith - background vocals (tracks 4, 5)
- Harry Stinson - drums, background vocals (track 10)
- Biff Watson - acoustic guitar

=== Track 2 ===
- Eddie Bayers - drums
- Sam Bush - mandolin
- Earl Thomas Conley - lead vocals
- Paul Franklin - pedal steel guitar
- Rob Hajacos - fiddle
- Mac McAnally - acoustic guitar
- Brent Mason - electric guitar
- Dave Pomeroy - upright bass
- Matt Rollings - piano
- Keith Whitley - duet vocals

=== Tracks 6–9 ===
- Michael Black - background vocals
- Earl Thomas Conley - lead vocals
- Glen Duncan - fiddle
- Steve Gibson - acoustic guitar, electric guitar
- Paul Franklin - pedal steel guitar, acoustic lap steel guitar, dobro
- Mitch Humphries - keyboards
- David Hungate - bass guitar
- Paul Leim - drums
- Brent Rowan - electric guitar
- Dennis Wilson - background vocals
- Curtis Young - background vocals

== Charts ==
=== Album ===
Chart (1991)	Peak position
Top Country Albums (Billboard)	53

=== Singles ===
Year	Chart	Single	Position
1991	Billboard Country Singles	"Shadow of a Doubt"	8
1991	Billboard Country Singles	"Brotherly Love"	2
