= Don't Make It Easy for Me (album) =

Studio album by Earl Thomas Conley
- Released: May 16, 1983
- Genre: Country
- Length: 34:43
- Label: RCA
- Producer: Nelson Larkin, Earl Thomas Conley

Earl Thomas Conley chronology
Somewhere Between Right and Wrong (1982)	Don't Make It Easy for Me (1983)	Treadin' Water (1984)

Singles from Don't Make It Easy for Me
- 1. "Your Love's on the Line" Released: April 1983; 2. "Holding Her and Loving You" Released: August 1983; 3. "Don't Make It Easy for Me" Released: January 2, 1984; 4. "Angel in Disguise" Released: April 30, 1984

Don’t make it easy for me is an album by American country music artist Earl Thomas Conley. All four singles from the album reached #1 on the Billboard Country Songs Chart making it the first album by an artist of any genre to accomplish that feat. (Reference : Billboard Magazine)

Don't Make It Easy for Me is the fourth studio album by American country music artist Earl Thomas Conley. It was released in May 16, 1983 via RCA Records. The album includes the singles "Your Love's on the Line", "Holding Her and Loving You", "Don't Make It Easy for Me" and "Angel in Disguise".

== Track listing ==
Don't Make It Easy for Me track listing
No.	Title	Writer(s)	Length
1.	"Don't Make It Easy for Me"	Earl Thomas Conley, Randy Scruggs	3:32
2.	"Your Love's on the Line"	Conley, Scruggs	3:30
3.	"Holding Her and Loving You"	Walt Aldridge, Tom Brasfield	3:08
4.	"You Can't Go On (Like a Rolling Stone)"	Conley, Scruggs	3:08
5.	"Crowd Around the Corner"	Conley	4:34
6.	"Ball and Chain"	Elton John, Gary Osborne	3:27
7.	"Angel in Disguise"	Conley, Scruggs	3:54
8.	"Under Control"	Conley, Nelson Larkin, Ron Oates	3:34
9.	"Changes of Love"	Conley, Scruggs	2:52
10.	"Home So Fine"	Conley	3:04

In the cassette version of the album, tracks 2 and 9 are switched.

== Personnel ==
- Guitar: Ken Bell, Shannon Fontaine, Kyle Frederick, Kenny Mims, Randy Scruggs
- Steel Guitar: Sonny Garrish
- Mandolin: Randy Scruggs
- Bass: Joe Osborn, J. D. Williamson, Bob Wray
- Keyboards: Tommy Montgomery, Ron Oates, Steve Scruggs
- Drums: Jerry Carrigan, Jerry Kroon, Mel Watts
- Saxophone: Jim Horn
- Fiddle: Rob Hajacos
- Backing Vocals: Fred Conley, Dennis Wilson

== Chart performance ==
Chart (1983)	Peak position
US Top Country Albums (Billboard)	3
