= Woke Up in Love =

Woke Up in Love may refer to:

- Woke Up in Love (Exile song), 1983
- Woke Up in Love (Kygo, Gryffin and Calum Scott song), 2022
