= Once in a Blue Moon (song) =

Single by Earl Thomas Conley

from the album Greatest Hits
- B-side: "I Have Loved You Girl (But Not Like This Before)"
- Released: January 27, 1986
- Genre: Country
- Length: 3:37
- Label: RCA
- Songwriter(s): Robert Byrne; Tom Brasfield
- Producer(s): Earl Thomas Conley; Nelson Larkin

Earl Thomas Conley singles chronology
"Nobody Falls Like a Fool" (1985)	"Once in a Blue Moon" (1986)	"Too Many Times" (1986)

"Once in a Blue Moon" is a song written by Robert Byrne and Tom Brasfield, and recorded by American country music artist Earl Thomas Conley. It was released in January 1986 as the second and final single from his Greatest Hits compilation album. The song was Conley's eleventh number one on the country chart. The single went to number one for one week and spent fourteen weeks on the country chart.

== Music video ==
A music video for the song was released and has been seen on GAC. During the video's prologue, "Silent Treatment" (Conley's first top 10 hit) can be heard in the background.

== Chart performance ==
Chart (1986)	Peak position
US Hot Country Songs (Billboard)	1
Canadian RPM Country Tracks	1
