= Fire and Ashes =

Fire and Ashes or Fire and Ash may refer to:

== Books ==
- Fire and Ashes, a 2013 book on politics by Michael Ignatieff
- Fire and Ashes, a 2003 book on forest fires by John N. Maclean
- Fire and Ashes, a 2009 book on cricket by Duncan Hamilton
- Fire & Ash, a 2013 novel by Jonathan Maberry, the fourth and final novel in the Rot & Ruin novel series
- Rising Stars Vol. 3: Fire and Ash, a comic book omnibus volume for J. Michael Straczynski's Rising Stars (comics)
- Wake: Fire and Ash, the first volume of the Wake series of science fiction graphic novels

== Film and television ==
- Avatar: Fire and Ash, 2025 American film directed by James Cameron
- Fire and Ashes (film), 1961 Iranian film directed by Khosrow Parvizi
- "Fire and Ashes", 1999 episode of British television series Heartbeat (Series 8, Episode 19)

== Music ==
- Fire & Ashes (EP), 2015 album by German symphonic metal band Xandria

== See also ==
- Ashes & Fire, 2011 album by Ryan Adams
- Fuoco E Cenere (Italian for 'Fire and Ash'), an early music ensemble
- Smoke and Fire (disambiguation)
- Fire (disambiguation)
- Ash (disambiguation)
