= What She Is (Is a Woman in Love) =

Single by Earl Thomas Conley

from the album The Heart of It All
- B-side: "Carol"
- Released: February 29, 1988
- Genre: Country
- Length: 4:05
- Label: RCA
- Songwriter(s): Bob McDill; Paul Harrison
- Producer(s): Emory Gordy Jr., Randy Scruggs

Earl Thomas Conley singles chronology
"Right from the Start" (1987)	"What She Is (Is a Woman in Love)" (1988)	"We Believe in Happy Endings" (1988)

"What She Is (Is a Woman in Love)" is a song written by Bob McDill and Paul Harrison and recorded by American country music artist Earl Thomas Conley. It was released in February 1988 as the lead single from the album The Heart of It All. The song Conley's fifteenth number one on the country chart. The single went to number one for one week and spent a total of thirteen weeks on the country chart.

== Charts ==
"What She Is (Is a Woman in Love)" debuted on the U.S. Billboard Hot Country Singles for the week of March 12, 1988.

=== Weekly charts ===
Chart (1988)	Peak position
US Hot Country Songs (Billboard)	1
Canadian RPM Country Tracks	2

=== Year-end charts ===
Chart (1988)	Position
US Hot Country Songs (Billboard)	27
