= Shadow of a Doubt (song) =

Single by Earl Thomas Conley

from the album Yours Truly
- B-side: "I Wanna Be Loved Back"
- Released: May 20, 1991
- Genre: Country
- Length: 2:58
- Label: RCA
- Songwriters: Tom Wopat, Robert Byrne
- Producer: Richard Landis

Earl Thomas Conley singles chronology
"Who's Gonna Tell Her Goodbye" (1990)	"Shadow of a Doubt" (1991)	"Brotherly Love" (1991)

"Shadow of a Doubt" is a song written by Tom Wopat and Robert Byrne, and recorded by American country music artist Earl Thomas Conley. It was released in May 1991 as the first single from the album Yours Truly. The song reached number 8 on the Billboard Hot Country Singles & Tracks chart.

== Chart performance ==
"Shadow of a Doubt" debuted on the U.S. Billboard Hot Country Singles & Tracks for the week of June 1, 1991.

Chart (1991)	Peak position
Canada Country Singles (RPM)	4
US Hot Country Songs (Billboard)	8

=== Year-end charts ===
Chart (1991)	Position
Canada Country Tracks (RPM)	57
US Country Songs (Billboard)	68
