= What I'd Say =

Single by Earl Thomas Conley

from the album The Heart of It All
- B-side: "Carol"
- Released: October 31, 1988
- Genre: Country
- Length: 3:52
- Label: RCA
- Songwriter(s): Robert Byrne; Will Robinson
- Producer(s): Emory Gordy Jr.; Randy Scruggs

Earl Thomas Conley singles chronology
"We Believe in Happy Endings" (1988)	"What I'd Say" (1988)	"Love Out Loud" (1989)

"What I'd Say" is a song written by Robert Byrne and Will Robinson, and recorded by American country music artist Earl Thomas Conley. It was released in October 1988 as the third single from his album The Heart of It All. The song was Conley's seventeenth number one country single. The single went to number one on the U.S. and Canadian country charts and spent a total of fourteen weeks on the U.S. country chart.

== Content ==
The song talks of a man holding imaginary conversations with the woman who'd left him, rehearsing what he might say if he ever ran into her. He doesn't know whether he would express his feelings, compliment her, or tell her to "go to hell." The song concludes by the man stating that his ex-lover would have to wait until the day they meet again to find out what he would say to her.

== Cover versions ==
The song was covered by Gary Allan on his 2001 album Alright Guy. It was also covered by Irish singer/songwriter Paul Harrington whose version was the title track of his debut album in 1988 and by Lorrie Morgan on her 2016 album “Letting Go... Slow”.

== Chart performance ==
"What I'd Say" debuted on the U.S. Billboard Hot Country Singles & Tracks for the week of November 12, 1988.

Chart (1988–1989)	Peak position
US Hot Country Songs (Billboard)	1
Canadian RPM Country Tracks	1

=== Year-end charts ===
Chart (1989)	Position
Canada Country Tracks (RPM)	27
US Country Songs (Billboard)	52
