= On the Front Line (Dan Seals album) =

Studio album by Dan Seals
- Released: 1986
- Recorded: 1985
- Studio: Morningstar Sound Studio (Hendersonville, Tennessee); GroundStar Studios (Nashville, Tennessee)
- Genre: Country
- Length: 36:29
- Label: EMI America
- Producer: Kyle Lehning

Dan Seals chronology
Won't Be Blue Anymore (1985)	On the Front Line (1986)	The Best (1987)

Singles from On the Front Line
- 1. "You Still Move Me" Released: September 1986; 2. "I Will Be There" Released: January 1987; 3. "Three Time Loser" Released: May 1987

Professional ratings
Review scores
Source	Rating
Allmusic	link

On The Front Line is the sixth studio album by American country music artist Dan Seals. It reached #12 on the Top Country Albums chart. "You Still Move Me", "I Will Be There", and "Three Time Loser" were all number one singles.

== Track listing ==
No.	Title	Writer(s)	Length
1.	"Out on the Front Line"	Dan Seals	4:38
2.	"Three Time Loser"	Seals	3:04
3.	"Loves Have Been Woven from Fewer Threads Than These"	Bucky Jones, Gary Nicholson, Kevin Welch	3:18
4.	"It's Gonna Be Easy Now"	Seals	3:11
5.	"Guitar Man Out of Control"	Seals	3:36
6.	"I Will Be There"	Tom Snow, Jennifer Kimball	3:49
7.	"You Still Move Me"	Seals	5:07
8.	"While I'm Here"	Rory Bourke, Mike Reid	3:34
9.	"I'm Still Strung Out on You"	Wendy Waldman, Seals	3:34
10.	"Lullaby"	Seals, Rafe Van Hoy	3:00

== Personnel ==
Adapted from liner notes.

- Dan Seals – lead vocals, backing vocals (1–5, 7, 9), acoustic guitar (2, 4), saxophone (5)
- Shane Keister – keyboards (1–3, 5, 7), synth intro (7)
- Mike Lawler – synthesizers (1, 4, 7), da-da-dums (6)
- Jay Spell – keyboards (1, 4, 5)
- Skip Sorrell – Synclavier (2)
- Dennis Burnside – keyboards (6, 8, 9)
- Mike Reid – synthesizers (8), backing vocals (8)
- Kenny Bell – acoustic guitar (1, 4, 5), electric rhythm guitar (5)
- Larry Byrom – electric guitar (1, 4)
- Steve Gibson – electric guitar (1, 4, 9), electric guitar solo (8), acoustic guitar (9)
- Joe Stanley – electric guitar (1, 2, 5)
- Bobby Thompson – acoustic guitar (1, 4), electric rhythm guitar (5)
- John Porter McMeans – electric guitar (3)
- Billy Joe Walker Jr. – electric guitar (3, 5, 7)
- Rafe Van Hoy – acoustic guitar (3, 10)
- Mark Casstevens – acoustic guitar (6, 9)
- Greg Jennings – electric guitar (6–9)
- Doyle Grisham – steel guitar (1, 3, 7, 9)
- Mark "Hoser" Hawthorne – steel guitar (2, 5)
- Jerry Douglas – dobro (4, 5, 9), lap steel guitar (6)
- Mark O'Connor – fiddle (4, 9, 10), mandolin (10)
- David Schnaufer – dulcimer (10)
- Mike Brignardello – bass (1, 3–6, 8, 9)
- David Hungate – bass (2)
- Bob Wray – bass (7)
- Larrie Londin – drums (1, 4, 5, 7), LinnDrum programming (2)
- Kyle Lehning – LinnDrum programming (2)
- Eddie Bayers – drums (3)
- James Stroud – drums (6, 8, 9)
- Farrell Morris – percussion (1, 4, 8)
- Kirk "Jelly Roll" Johnson – harmonica (4)
- Jim Horn – saxophone (5)
- Lisa Silver – backing vocals (5, 7, 9)
- Diane Tidwell – backing vocals (5, 7, 9)
- Dennis Wilson – backing vocals (5, 7, 9)
- Kathie Baillie – backing vocals (6)
- Michael Bonagura – backing vocals (6)
- Alan LeBouf – backing vocals (6)
- Bruce Dees – backing vocals (8)
- Emmylou Harris – lead vocals (10)

=== Production ===
- Kyle Lehning – producer, mixing, engineer (2, 3, 7, 10)
- Randy Gardner – engineer
- Ben Harris – engineer (1, 4, 5)
- Kirt Odle – mixing, engineer (3, 6–9)
- Joseph Bogan – engineer (6, 8, 9)
- Doug Sax – mastering at The Mastering Lab (Hollywood, California)
- Mark Tucker – photography
- Henry Marquez – art direction
- Michael Hodgson – design
- Tony Gottlieb for Morningstar Management – management

== Chart performance ==
=== Album ===
Chart (1986)	Peak position
U.S. Billboard Top Country Albums	12

=== Singles ===
Year	Single	Peak positions	
Year	Single	US Country	CAN Country
1986	"You Still Move Me"	1	1
1987	"I Will Be There"	1	1
1987	"Three Time Loser"	1	1
