= Honor Bound (song) =

Single by Earl Thomas Conley

from the album Treadin' Water
- B-side: "Too Hot To Handle"
- Released: January 6, 1985
- Genre: Country
- Length: 3:18
- Label: RCA
- Songwriters: Tommy Rocco; Charlie Black; Austin Roberts
- Producer: Nelson Larkin

Earl Thomas Conley singles chronology
"All Tangled Up in Love" (1984)	"Honor Bound" (1985)	"Love Don't Care (Whose Heart It Breaks)" (1985)

"Honor Bound" is a song written by Tommy Rocco, Charlie Black and Austin Roberts, and recorded by American country music artist Earl Thomas Conley. It was released in January 1985 as the second single from the album Treadin' Water. The song was Conley's eighth number one country single. The single went to number one for one week and spent a total of thirteen weeks on the country chart.

== Critical reception ==
Kip Kirby of Billboard magazine reviewed the song favorably, calling it an "understated, impassioned statement on the dilemma of a woman bound only by honor; rhythm is slow and controversial."

== Charts ==
=== Weekly charts ===
Chart (1985)	Peak position
US Hot Country Songs (Billboard)	1
Canadian RPM Country Tracks	1

=== Year-end charts ===
Chart (1985)	Position
US Hot Country Songs (Billboard)	19
