= Love Out Loud (song) =

Single by Earl Thomas Conley

from the album The Heart of It All
- B-side: "No Chance No Dance"
- Released: March 13, 1989
- Genre: Country
- Length: 3:49
- Label: RCA
- Songwriter: Thom Schuyler
- Producers: Emory Gordy Jr., Randy Scruggs

Earl Thomas Conley singles chronology
"What I'd Say" (1988)	"Love Out Loud" (1989)	"You Must Not Be Drinking Enough" (1989)

"Love Out Loud" is a song written by Thom Schuyler, and recorded by American country music artist Earl Thomas Conley. It was released in March 1989 as the fourth single from the album The Heart of It All. The song was Conley's eighteenth and final number one on the country chart as a solo artist. The single went to number one for one week and spent fifteen weeks on the country chart.

== Cover versions ==
It was covered in 2016 by Lorrie Morgan on her album Letting Go...Slow.

== Chart performance ==
"Love Out Loud" debuted on the U.S. Billboard Hot Country Singles & Tracks for the week of March 18, 1989.

Chart (1989)	Peak position
Canada Country Singles (RPM)	2
US Hot Country Songs (Billboard)	1

=== Year-end charts ===
Chart (1989)	Position
Canada Country Tracks (RPM)	58
US Country Songs (Billboard)	11
