= Your Love's on the Line =

Single by Earl Thomas Conley

from the album Don't Make It Easy for Me
- B-side: "Under Control"
- Released: April 1983
- Genre: Country
- Length: 3:27
- Label: RCA
- Songwriter(s): Earl Thomas Conley; Randy Scruggs
- Producer(s): Nelson Larkin, Earl Thomas Conley

Earl Thomas Conley singles chronology
"I Have Loved You Girl (But Not Like This Before)" (1983)	"Your Love's on the Line" (1983)	"Holding Her and Loving You" (1983)

"Your Love's on the Line" is a song recorded by American country music artist Earl Thomas Conley. The song was written by Conley along with Randy Scruggs, and was released in April 1983 as the lead single from the album Don't Make It Easy for Me. The song was Conley's third number one on the country chart. The single went to number one for one week and spent a total of thirteen weeks on the country chart.

== Charts ==
=== Weekly charts ===
Chart (1983)	Peak position
US Hot Country Songs (Billboard)	1
Canadian RPM Country Tracks	8

=== Year-end charts ===
Chart (1983)	Position
US Hot Country Songs (Billboard)	12
