= All Tangled Up in Love =

Single by Gus Hardin with Earl Thomas Conley

from the album Wall of Tears
- B-side: "More or Less"
- Released: October 1984
- Genre: Country
- Label: RCA Records
- Songwriters: Bob McDill; Jim Weatherly
- Producer: Mark Wright

Gus Hardin singles chronology
"How Are You Spending My Nights" (1984)	"All Tangled Up in Love" (1984)	"My Mind Is On You" (1985)

Earl Thomas Conley singles chronology
"Chance of Lovin' You" (1984)	"All Tangled Up in Love" (1984)	"Honor Bound" (1985)

"All Tangled Up in Love" is a song recorded by American country music artists Gus Hardin and Earl Thomas Conley. It was released in October 1984 as the first single from Hardin's album Wall of Tears. The song peaked at number 8 on the Billboard Hot Country Singles chart. The song was written by Bob McDill and Jim Weatherly.

== Chart performance ==
Chart (1984–1985)	Peak position
US Hot Country Songs (Billboard)	8
Canadian RPM Country Tracks	8
