= Too Many Times (album) =

Studio album by Earl Thomas Conley
- Released: September 18, 1986
- Genre: Country
- Length: 36:44
- Label: RCA
- Producer: Nelson Larkin, Earl Thomas Conley, Mark Wright

Earl Thomas Conley chronology
Greatest Hits (1985)	Too Many Times (1986)	The Heart of It All (1988)

Singles from Too Many Times
- 1. "Too Many Times" Released: July 28, 1986; 2. "I Can't Win for Losin' You" Released: November 24, 1986; 3. "That Was a Close One" Released: March 30, 1987; 4. "Right from the Start" Released: July 22, 1987

Too Many Times is the sixth studio album by American country music artist Earl Thomas Conley. It was released on September 18, 1986, via RCA Records. The album includes the singles "Too Many Times", his duet with Anita Pointer, "I Can't Win for Losin' You", "That Was a Close One" and "Right from the Start".

== Track listing ==
No.	Title	Writer(s)	Length
1.	"Too Many Times" (duet with Anita Pointer)	Micheal Smotherman, Scott Page, Tony McShear	3:55
2.	"I Can't Win for Losin' You"	Robert Byrne, Rick Bowles	4:06
3.	"Dancin' with the Flame"	Ron "Snake" Reynolds	3:06
4.	"Attracted to Pain"	Earl Thomas Conley, Randy Scruggs	3:19
5.	"Many Forgiving Years"	Joe Scaife, Mark Wright	3:47
6.	"Right from the Start"	Billy Herzig, Randy Watkins	3:08
7.	"That Was a Close One"	Byrne	4:26
8.	"I Need a Good Woman Bad"	Conley, Tom Brasfield	4:07
9.	"Preservation of the Wild Life"	Jim Allison, Linda Young	3:13
10.	"If Leavin' Was Easy"	Conley, Scruggs	3:37

== Chart performance ==
Chart (1986)	Peak position
US Top Country Albums (Billboard)	3
