= Exile (1983 Exile album) =

Studio album by Exile
- Released: 1983
- Studio: Soundshop Recording Studios, and Tree International Studios Nashville, TN
- Genre: Country
- Length: 33:37
- Label: Epic
- Producer: Buddy Killen

Exile chronology
Heart and Soul (1981)	Exile (1983)	Kentucky Hearts (1984)

Exile is the seventh studio album by American country group Exile. It was released in 1984 via Epic Records. The album includes the singles "High Cost of Leaving", "Woke Up in Love" and "I Don't Want to Be a Memory".

== Track listing ==
No.	Title	Writer(s)	Length
1.	"Take Me to the River"	J. P. Pennington	2:53
2.	"Woke Up in Love"	Pennington	3:06
3.	"Red Dancing Shoes"	Mark Gray, Sonny LeMaire	3:41
4.	"We've Still Got Love"	Pennington, LeMaire	3:32
5.	"I Just Came Back to Break My Heart Again"	Pennington, Larry Cordle	2:53
6.	"This Could Be the Start of Something Good"	Pennington, LeMaire	4:19
7.	"After All These Years (I'm Still Chasing You)"	Pennington	3:03
8.	"High Cost of Leaving"	Pennington, Gray, LeMaire	3:38
9.	"I Don't Want to Be a Memory"	Pennington, LeMaire	3:38
10.	"Here I Go Again"	Pennington	2:50

== Personnel ==
- J.P. Pennington — guitars, vocals; lead vocals (tracks 1, 2, 9, 10)
- Les Taylor — guitars, vocals; lead vocals (tracks 3-8)
- Marlon Hargis — keyboards
- Sonny Lemaire — bass, backup vocals
- Steve Goetzman — drums

Additional musicians

- Ricky Skaggs — fiddle and mandocaster (track 1)
- Lee Greenwood — saxophone (track 6)
- Terry McMillan — percussion (tracks 3, 9)

== Chart performance ==
Chart (1983)	Peak position
US Top Country Albums (Billboard)	10
Canadian RPM Country Albums	4
