= Gus Hardin =

American country music singer (1945–1996)

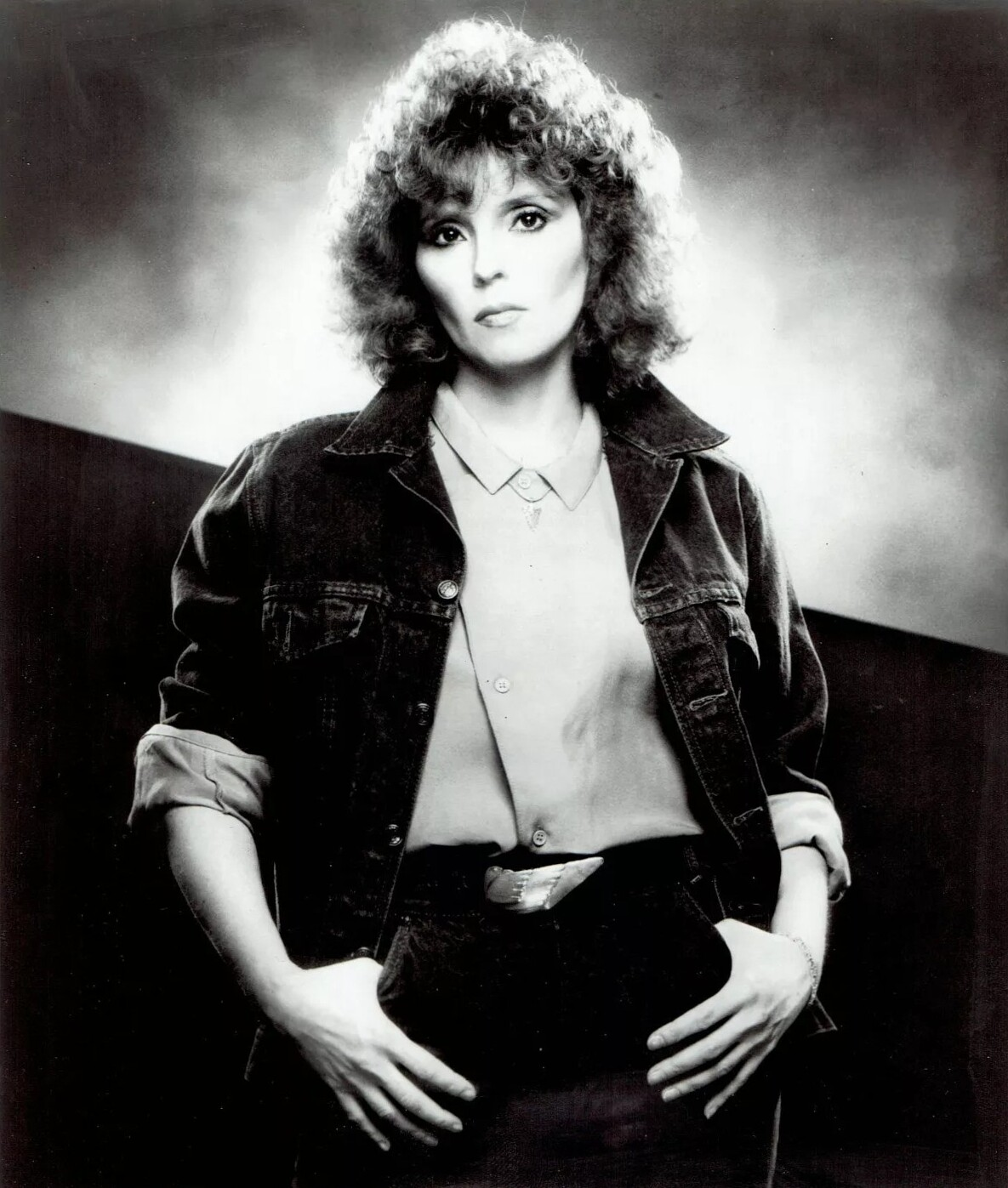
- Hardin, c. 1983

Background information
- Born: Carolyn Ann Blankenship; April 9, 1945; Tulsa, Oklahoma, U.S.
- Died: February 17, 1996 (aged 50) Salina, Oklahoma, U.S.
- Genres: Country
- Occupation: Singer
- Instrument: Vocals
- Years active: 1983–1996
- Label: RCA

Gus Hardin (born Carolyn Ann Blankenship; April 9, 1945 – February 17, 1996) was a country music singer. She recorded for RCA Records between 1983 and 1986, releasing two albums and one extended play. In addition to these, she had a hit single with the Earl Thomas Conley duet "All Tangled Up in Love".

== Career ==
Carolyn Ann Blankenship was born in 1945 in Tulsa, Oklahoma. Her rise to country music popularity began in 1983 with her first single for RCA Records, the top 10 hit "After The Last Goodbye." Other hits, such as "Fallen Angel," "I Pass," "Lovin' You Hurts" and "If I Didn't Love You" soon followed, as well as "All Tangled Up in Love," a duet with Earl Thomas Conley. She recorded and released "One of the Boys" and "Mama Knows" by songwriter Kevin Weyl, and "Tornado" by Kevin Weyl and Steve Robertson which is featured in the sound track of the Kevin Pollak film Deterrence.

Hardin married keyboard player Steve Hardin, who was a member of the group Point Blank, and after their divorce kept his last name. Garth Brooks' sister, Betsy Smittle, was one of Gus's band members and did background vocals on Gus's album I'm Dancing as Fast as I Can.

== Death ==
On February 17, 1996, Hardin died in a car accident on State Highway 20 west of Salina, Oklahoma, near her home in the Lake Hudson area. A laboratory report listed her blood alcohol level at 0.28 percent. Memorial services were held in Oklahoma and Nashville, Tennessee. Gus Hardin is survived by daughter Toni Jones and granddaughter Chelsea Johnson, both of Sapulpa, Oklahoma.

== Discography ==
=== Albums ===
Title	Details	Peak positions
Title	Details	US Country
Fallen Angel	Release year: 1984; Label: RCA	63
Wall of Tears	Release year: 1984; Label: RCA	64
I'm Dancing as Fast as I Can	Release year: 2001; Label: Rainy Day	—
"—" denotes releases that did not chart

=== Extended plays ===
Title	Details	Peak positions
Title	Details	US Country
Gus Hardin	Release year: 1983; Label: RCA	31

=== Singles ===
Year	Title	Peak positions		Album
Year	Title	US Country	CAN Country	Album
1983	"After the Last Goodbye"	10	—	Gus Hardin
1983	"If I Didn't Love You"	26	—	Gus Hardin
1983	"Loving You Hurts"	32	—	Gus Hardin
1983	"Fallen Angel (Flying High Tonight)"	41	—	Fallen Angel
1984	"I Pass"	43	—	Fallen Angel
1984	"How Are You Spending My Nights"	52	—	Fallen Angel
1984	"All Tangled Up in Love" (with Earl Thomas Conley)	8	8	Wall of Tears
1985	"My Mind Is On You"	79	—	Wall of Tears
1985	"Just as Long as I Have You" (with Dave Loggins)	72	52	Wall of Tears (1985 re-issue)
1986	"What We Gonna Do"	73	—	Wall of Tears
"—" denotes releases that did not chart

=== Music videos ===
Year	Title
1984	"I Pass"
