= After the Love Slips Away =

Single by Earl Thomas Conley

from the album Fire & Smoke
- B-side: "Smokey Mountain Memories"
- Released: February 6, 1982
- Genre: Country
- Length: 3:17
- Label: RCA
- Songwriter(s): Earl Thomas Conley
- Producer(s): Nelson Larkin, Earl Thomas Conley

Earl Thomas Conley singles chronology
"Tell Me Why" (1981)	"After the Love Slips Away" (1982)	"Heavenly Bodies" (1982)

"After the Love Slips Away" is a song written and recorded by American country music artist Earl Thomas Conley. It was released in February 1982 as the fourth single from the album Fire & Smoke. The song reached number 16 on the Billboard Hot Country Singles & Tracks chart.

== Chart performance ==
Chart (1982)	Peak position
US Hot Country Songs (Billboard)	16
Canadian RPM Country Tracks	31
