= You Must Not Be Drinking Enough =

Single by Earl Thomas Conley

from the album The Heart of It All
- B-side: "Too Far from the Heart of It All"
- Released: October 7, 1989
- Genre: Country
- Length: 4:12
- Label: RCA
- Songwriter: Danny Kortchmar
- Producers: Emory Gordy Jr.; Randy Scruggs

Earl Thomas Conley singles chronology
"Love Out Loud" (1989)	"You Must Not Be Drinking Enough" (1989)	"Bring Back Your Love to Me" (1990)

Official audio
- "You Must Not Be Drinking Enough" on YouTube

"You Must Not Be Drinking Enough" is a song recorded by American country music singer-songwriter Earl Thomas Conley. It was released on October 7, 1989, by RCA Records as the fifth single from his seventh studio album The Heart of It All (1988). The song reached No. 26 on the Billboard Hot Country Single & Tracks chart. The song was written by guitarist Danny Kortchmar.

The song was first released by the Eagles' Don Henley in 1984 under the title "You're Not Drinking Enough" on his second solo studio album Building the Perfect Beast, with Sam Moore of the soul and R&B duo Sam & Dave singing harmony vocals.

== Personnel ==
- Don Henley – lead vocals, drums
- David Paich – acoustic piano
- Danny Kortchmar – organ, Omnichord, guitars
- Tim Drummond – bass guitar
- Sam Moore – harmony vocals

== Chart performance ==
Chart (1989)	Peak position
US Hot Country Songs (Billboard)	26
Canadian RPM Country Tracks	39
