= Heavenly Bodies (song) =

1982 single by Earl Thomas Conley

Single by Earl Thomas Conley

from the album Somewhere Between Right and Wrong
- B-side: "The Highway Home"
- Released: May 31, 1982
- Genre: Country
- Length: 3:08
- Label: RCA
- Songwriter(s): Elaine Lifton, Gloria Nissenson, Lee Ritenour
- Producer(s): Nelson Larkin, Earl Thomas Conley

Earl Thomas Conley singles chronology
"After the Love Slips Away" (1982)	"Heavenly Bodies" (1982)	"Somewhere Between Right and Wrong" (1982)

"Heavenly Bodies" is a song written by Elaine Lifton, Gloria Nissenson and Lee Ritenour, and recorded by American country music artist Earl Thomas Conley. It was released in May 1982 as the first single from the album Somewhere Between Right and Wrong. The song reached #8 on the Billboard Hot Country Singles & Tracks chart.

== Critical reception ==
Kip Kirby of Billboard magazine reviewed the song favorably, saying that the tune "lives up to his own imagery" even though he didn't write it. He goes on to say that the "clean, easy-tempo arrangement leaves proper space for hearing the singer's thoughtful comparison of a woman to astral attractions."

== Chart performance ==
Chart (1982)	Peak position
US Hot Country Songs (Billboard)	8
Canadian RPM Country Tracks	3
