= Somewhere Between Right and Wrong (album) =

Studio album by Earl Thomas Conley
- Released: August 16, 1982
- Genre: Country
- Length: 31:22
- Label: RCA
- Producer: Nelson Larkin, Earl Thomas Conley

Earl Thomas Conley chronology
Fire & Smoke (1981)	Somewhere Between Right and Wrong (1982)	Don't Make It Easy for Me (1983)

Singles from Somewhere Between Right and Wrong
- 1. "Heavenly Bodies" Released: May 31, 1982; 2. "Somewhere Between Right and Wrong" Released: September 20, 1982; 3. "I Have Loved You Girl (But Not Like This Before)" Released: January 10, 1983

Somewhere Between Right and Wrong is the third studio album by American country music artist Earl Thomas Conley. It was released on August 16, 1982 via RCA Records. The album includes the singles "Heavenly Bodies", "Somewhere Between Right and Wrong" and "I Have Loved You Girl (But Not Like This Before)".

== Track listing ==
No.	Title	Writer(s)	Length
1.	"Heavenly Bodies"	Elaine Lifton, Gloria Nissensen, Lee Ritenour	3:05
2.	"Don't Get Along with the Blues"	Earl Thomas Conley	3:07
3.	"This Ain't No Way to Be"	Conley, Randy Scruggs	3:38
4.	"If It Ain't Something (You Give Me)"	Conley	4:08
5.	"The Highway Home"	Conley, Scruggs	3:48
6.	"Somewhere Between Right and Wrong"	Conley	4:10
7.	"We've Got All Night"	Conley	3:06
8.	"Bottled Up Blues"	Conley, Rick Scott	2:20
9.	"I Have Loved You Girl (But Not Like This Before)"	Conley	2:38
10.	"The Man Inside of Me"	Conley	1:17

== Chart performance ==
Chart (1982)	Peak position
US Top Country Albums (Billboard)	10
