= The Heart of It All =

Studio album by Earl Thomas Conley
- Released: April 29, 1988
- Recorded: 1987
- Studio: Emerald Sound (Nashville, Tennessee); Scruggs Sound (Berry Hill, Tennessee)
- Genre: Country
- Length: 36:43
- Label: RCA
- Producer: Emory Gordy Jr., Randy Scruggs

Earl Thomas Conley chronology
Too Many Times (1986)	The Heart of It All (1988)	Greatest Hits, Volume II (1990)

Singles from The Heart of It All
- 1. "What She Is (Is a Woman in Love)" Released: February 29, 1988; 2. "We Believe in Happy Endings" Released: June 27, 1988; 3. "What I'd Say" Released: October 31, 1988; 4. "Love Out Loud" Released: March 13, 1989; 5. "You Must Not Be Drinking Enough" Released: October 7, 1989

The Heart of It All is the seventh studio album by American country music artist Earl Thomas Conley. It was released on April 29, 1988 via RCA Records. The album includes the singles "What She Is (Is a Woman in Love)", "We Believe in Happy Endings", his duet with Emmylou Harris, "What I'd Say", "Love Out Loud" and "You Must Not Be Drinking Enough".

== Track listing ==
No.	Title	Writer(s)	Length
1.	"What She Is (Is a Woman in Love)"	Bob McDill, Paul Harrison	4:02
2.	"Love Out Loud"	Thom Schuyler	3:48
3.	"What I'd Say"	Robert Byrne, Will Robinson	3:52
4.	"You Must Not Be Drinking Enough"	Danny Kortchmar	4:11
5.	"Carol"	Earl Thomas Conley, Randy Scruggs	3:38
6.	"No Chance, No Dance"	Earl Thomas Conley, Byrne	3:23
7.	"I Love the Way He Left You"	Byrne, Tom Brasfield	3:42
8.	"Finally Friday"	Bobby Boyd, DeWayne Mize, Dennis Robbins, Warren Haynes	2:41
9.	"We Believe in Happy Endings" (duet with Emmylou Harris)	McDill	3:35
10.	"Too Far from the Heart of It All"	Conley, Scruggs	4:11
Total length:			37:03

== Chart performance ==
Chart (1988)	Peak position
US Top Country Albums (Billboard)	33
