= Tell Me Why (Earl Thomas Conley song) =

Single by Earl Thomas Conley

from the album Fire & Smoke
- B-side: "Too Much Noise (Trucker's Waltz)"
- Released: October 17, 1981
- Genre: Country
- Length: 3:21
- Label: RCA
- Songwriter(s): John Booth Aclin
- Producer(s): Nelson Larkin, Earl Thomas Conley

Earl Thomas Conley singles chronology
"Fire and Smoke" (1981)	"Tell Me Why" (1981)	"After the Love Slips Away" (1982)

"Tell Me Why" is a song written by John Booth Aclin, and recorded by the American country music artist Earl Thomas Conley. It was released in October 1981 as the third single from the album Fire & Smoke. The song reached number 10 on the Billboard Hot Country Singles & Track chart.

== Chart performance ==
Chart (1981–1982)	Peak position
US Hot Country Songs (Billboard)	10
