= Love Don't Care (Whose Heart It Breaks) =

Single by Earl Thomas Conley

from the album Treadin' Water
- B-side: "Turn This Bus Around (Bad Bob's)"
- Released: April 29, 1985
- Genre: Country
- Length: 3:31
- Label: RCA
- Songwriter(s): Earl Thomas Conley; Randy Scruggs
- Producer(s): Nelson Larkin

Earl Thomas Conley singles chronology
"Honor Bound" (1985)	"Love Don't Care (Whose Heart It Breaks)" (1985)	"Nobody Falls Like a Fool" (1985)

"Love Don't Care (Whose Heart It Breaks)" is a song co-written and recorded by American country music artist Earl Thomas Conley. It was released in April 1985 as the third and final single from the album Treadin' Water. The song was Conley's ninth number one country hit as a solo artist. The single went to number one for one week and spent a total of thirteen weeks on the country chart. The song was written by Conley and Randy Scruggs.

== Music video ==
A music video for the song was released and has been seen on GAC.

== Charts ==
=== Weekly charts ===
Chart (1985)	Peak position
US Hot Country Songs (Billboard)	1
Canadian RPM Country Tracks	1

=== Year-end charts ===
Chart (1985)	Position
US Hot Country Songs (Billboard)	28
