= Brotherly Love (Moe Bandy song) =

Single by Keith Whitley with Earl Thomas Conley

from the album Kentucky Bluebird and Yours Truly
- B-side: "Backbone Job"
- Released: August 26, 1991
- Recorded: 1987
- Genre: Country
- Length: 3:19
- Label: RCA #62037
- Songwriters: Tim Nichols; Jimmy Alan Stewart
- Producers: Blake Mevis; Garth Fundis

Keith Whitley singles chronology
"'Til a Tear Becomes a Rose" (1990)	"Brotherly Love" (1991)	"Somebody's Doin' Me Right" (1992)

Earl Thomas Conley singles chronology
"Shadow of a Doubt" (1991)	"Brotherly Love" (1991)	"Hard Days and Honky Tonk Nights" (1992)

"Brotherly Love" is a song written by Jimmy Alan Stewart and Tim Nichols, which has been recorded by Moe Bandy, as well as a duet between Keith Whitley and Earl Thomas Conley.

Bandy's version appears on his 1989 studio album Many Mansions for Curb Records. The song was the second single from that album, reaching a peak of number 53 on the country music charts in 1989.

Country singer Billy Dean recorded the song on his 1990 debut album Young Man.

== Chart performance ==
Chart (1989)	Peak position
US Hot Country Songs (Billboard)	53

== Keith Whitley and Earl Thomas Conley version ==
Keith Whitley and Earl Thomas Conley recorded the song as a duet in 1987, but it was not included on an album until it concurrently appeared on Whitley's posthumous 1991 album Kentucky Bluebird and Conley's 1991 album Yours Truly. This duet version charted for twenty weeks on Hot Country Singles & Tracks, peaking at number two and holding the position for one week, behind "Shameless" by Garth Brooks. This was the last top 10 hit for both Whitley and Conley.

In 1992, this version was nominated by the Country Music Association for Vocal Event of the Year. It also earned them a nomination for the Grammy Award for Best Country Collaboration with Vocals.

=== Personnel ===
Compiled from liner notes.

- Eddie Bayers — drums
- Sam Bush — mandolin
- Paul Franklin — steel guitar
- Rob Hajacos — fiddle
- Brent Mason — electric guitar
- Mac McAnally — acoustic guitar
- Dave Pomeroy — upright bass
- Matt Rollings — piano

=== Chart performance ===
Chart (1991)	Peak position
Canada Country Singles (RPM)	6
US Hot Country Songs (Billboard)	2

=== Year-end charts ===
Chart (1991)	Position
Canada Country Tracks (RPM)	69
