= Somewhere Between Right and Wrong (song) =

Single by Earl Thomas Conley

from the album Somewhere Between Right and Wrong
- B-side: "Fire and Smoke"
- Released: September 20, 1982
- Genre: Country
- Length: 4:12
- Label: RCA
- Songwriter(s): Earl Thomas Conley
- Producer(s): Earl Thomas Conley; Nelson Larkin

Earl Thomas Conley singles chronology
"Heavenly Bodies" (1982)	"Somewhere Between Right and Wrong" (1982)	"I Have Loved You Girl (But Not Like This Before)" (1983)

"Somewhere Between Right and Wrong" is a song written and recorded by American country music artist Earl Thomas Conley. It was released in September 1982 as the second single and title track from the album Somewhere Between Right and Wrong. The song was Conley's second number one on the country charts. The single went to number one for one week and spent a total of thirteen weeks on the country chart.

== Charts ==
Chart (1982)	Peak position
US Hot Country Songs (Billboard)	1
Canadian RPM Country Tracks	39
