= Fire & Smoke =

Studio album by Earl Thomas Conley
- Released: October 14, 1981
- Genre: Country
- Length: 32:47
- Label: RCA
- Producer: Nelson Larkin, Earl Thomas Conley

Earl Thomas Conley chronology
Blue Pearl (1980)	Fire & Smoke (1981)	Somewhere Between Right and Wrong (1982)

Singles from Fire & Smoke
- 1. "Silent Treatment" Released: November 3, 1980; 2. "Fire and Smoke" Released: April 20, 1981; 3. "Tell Me Why" Released: October 17, 1981; 4. "After the Love Slips Away" Released: February 6, 1982

Fire & Smoke is the second studio album and major label debut by American country music artist Earl Thomas Conley. It was released on October 14, 1981 via RCA Records. The album contains the singles "Silent Treatment", "Fire and Smoke", "Tell Me Why" and "After the Love Slips Away"

== Track listing ==
No.	Title	Writer(s)	Length
1.	"Fire and Smoke"	Earl Thomas Conley	3:12
2.	"Silent Treatment"	Conley	3:14
3.	"Too Much Noise (Trucker's Waltz"	Conley	2:40
4.	"Smokey Mountains Memories"	Conley, Dick Heard	3:30
5.	"This Time I've Hurt Her More (Than She Loves Me)"	Conley, Mary Larkin	3:16
6.	"Tell Me Why"	John Booth Aclin	3:16
7.	"After the Love Slips Away"	Conley	3:14
8.	"Your Love Is Just for Strangers (I Suppose)"	Conley	3:07
9.	"Like Cinderella"	Conley	3:25
10.	"As Low as You Can Go"	Conley	3:41

== Chart performance ==
Chart (1981)	Peak position
US Top Country Albums (Billboard)	19
