= Too Many Times (Earl Thomas Conley and Anita Pointer song) =

Single by Earl Thomas Conley with Anita Pointer

from the album Too Many Times
- B-side: "Changes of Love"
- Released: July 28, 1986
- Genre: Country
- Length: 3:56
- Label: RCA
- Songwriter(s): Micheal Smotherman, Scott Page, Tony McShear
- Producer(s): Nelson Larkin, Mark Wright

Earl Thomas Conley singles chronology
"Once in a Blue Moon" (1986)	"Too Many Times" (1986)	"I Can't Win for Losin' You" (1986)

"Too Many Times" is a song written by Micheal Smotherman, Scott Page, and Tony McShear and recorded by American country music artist Earl Thomas Conley and R&B artist Anita Pointer. It was released in July 1986 as the first single and title track from Conley's album Too Many Times. It reached number 2 on the Billboard Hot Country Singles & Tracks chart.

== Chart performance ==
Chart (1986)	Peak position
US Hot Country Songs (Billboard)	2
Canadian RPM Country Tracks	3
