= Three Time Loser =

Single by Dan Seals

from the album On the Front Line
- B-side: "On the Front Line"
- Released: May 1987
- Genre: Country
- Length: 3:04
- Label: EMI America
- Songwriter(s): Dan Seals
- Producer(s): Kyle Lehning

Dan Seals singles chronology
"I Will Be There" (1987)	"Three Time Loser" (1987)	"One Friend" (1987)

"Three Time Loser" is a song written and recorded by American country music artist Dan Seals. It was released in May 1987 as the third single from the album On the Front Line. It was his sixth straight number-one single on the Billboard country charts.

== Charts ==
=== Weekly charts ===
Chart (1987)	Peak position
US Hot Country Songs (Billboard)	1
Canadian RPM Country Tracks	1

=== Year-end charts ===
Chart (1987)	Position
US Hot Country Songs (Billboard)	31
