= Right from the Start =

Single by Earl Thomas Conley

Single by Earl Thomas Conley

from the album Too Many Times
- B-side: "Attracted to Pain"
- Released: July 27, 1987
- Genre: Country
- Length: 3:08
- Label: RCA
- Songwriter(s): Billy Herzig; Randy Watkins
- Producer(s): Earl Thomas Conley; Nelson Larkin; Mark Wright

Earl Thomas Conley singles chronology
"That Was a Close One" (1987)	"Right from the Start" (1987)	"What She Is (Is a Woman in Love)" (1988)

"Right from the Start" is a song written by Billy Herzig and Randy Watkins, and recorded by American country music artist Earl Thomas Conley. It was released in July 1987 as the fourth single from the album Too Many Times. The song was Conley's fourteenth number one country single. The single went to number one for one week and spent a total of fourteen weeks on the country chart.

== Charts ==
=== Weekly charts ===
Chart (1987)	Peak position
US Hot Country Songs (Billboard)	1
Canadian RPM Country Tracks	1

=== Year-end charts ===
Chart (1987)	Position
US Hot Country Songs (Billboard)	39
