= Holding Her and Loving You =

Single by Earl Thomas Conley

from the album Don't Make It Easy for Me
- B-side: "Home So Fine"
- Released: August 1983
- Genre: Country
- Length: 3:09
- Label: RCA
- Songwriter(s): Walt Aldridge; Tom Brasfield
- Producer(s): Nelson Larkin, Earl Thomas Conley

Earl Thomas Conley singles chronology
"Your Love's on the Line" (1983)	"Holding Her and Loving You" (1983)	"Don't Make It Easy for Me" (1984)

"Holding Her and Loving You" is a song written by Walt Aldridge and Tom Brasfield and recorded by American country music artist Earl Thomas Conley. It was released in August 1983 as the second single from the album Don't Make It Easy for Me. The song was Conley's fourth number one country single.

== Commercial performance ==
The single went to number one for one week and spent a total of fourteen weeks on the country chart. Since it became available for download, the song has sold 156,000 copies as of April 2019.

== Music video ==
A music video for the song was released and has been seen on GAC.

== Covers ==
In 1998, Clay Walker charted a live recording of this song, reaching number 68 on the same chart.

== Chart performance ==
Chart (1983)	Peak position
US Hot Country Songs (Billboard)	1
Canadian RPM Country Tracks	2
