= Honey (Open That Door) =

Single by Ricky Skaggs

from the album Don't Cheat in Our Hometown
- B-side: "She's More to Be Pitied"
- Released: February 1984
- Recorded: 1979
- Genre: Country
- Length: 3:28
- Label: Epic
- Songwriter(s): Mel Tillis
- Producer(s): Ricky Skaggs

Ricky Skaggs singles chronology
"Don't Cheat in Our Hometown" (1983)	"Honey (Open That Door)" (1984)	"Uncle Pen" (1984)

Honey (Open That Door)" is a song written by Mel Tillis and recorded by American country music artist Webb Pierce and by Ricky Skaggs. Pierce recorded it for his 1962 album Hideaway Heart. It was also a non-charted single by Pierce released in 1974.

Skaggs released his version in February 1984 as the second single from his album Don't Cheat in Our Hometown. The song was Skaggs' seventh #1 on the country chart. The single stayed at #1 for one week and spent a total of 11 weeks on the country chart.

== Charts ==
=== Weekly charts ===
Chart (1984)	Peak position
US Hot Country Songs (Billboard)	1
Canadian RPM Country Tracks	1

=== Year-end charts ===
Chart (1984)	Position
US Hot Country Songs (Billboard)	49
