= I Have Loved You Girl (But Not Like This Before) =

Single by Earl Thomas Conley

from the album Somewhere Between Right and Wrong
- B-side: "Tryin' to Beat the Morning Home" (1975); "Bottled Up Blues" (1983)
- Released: July 1975; January 10, 1983
- Genre: Country
- Length: 2:36
- Label: GRT (1975); RCA (1983)
- Songwriter: Earl Thomas Conley
- Producers: Nelson Larkin, Earl Thomas Conley

Earl Thomas Conley singles chronology
"Somewhere Between Right and Wrong" (1982)	"I Have Loved You Girl (But Not Like This Before)" (1975)	"Your Love's on the Line" (1983)

"I Have Loved You Girl (But Not Like This Before)" is a song written and recorded by American country music artist Earl Thomas Conley. He first released the song in 1975 on the GRT label as Earl Conley, reaching number 87 on the Hot Country Songs chart.

In January 1983, Conley re-released the song as the third from his album Somewhere Between Right and Wrong. The re-recording went to number two on the same chart that year.

== Critical reception ==
Kip Kirby of Billboard magazine reviewed the song favorably, calling it one of the brightest songs on the album. She went on to say that Conley combines "an excellent melody, expressive vocals and sensitive lyrics for a fresh way of presenting a love song." She states that the "lean guitar/piano rhythms leave proper space for Conley's singing."

== Charts ==
=== Weekly charts ===
Chart (1975)	Peak position
US Hot Country Songs (Billboard)	87
Chart (1983)	Peak position
US Hot Country Songs (Billboard)	2
Canadian RPM Country Tracks	3

=== Year-end charts ===
Chart (1983)	Position
US Hot Country Songs (Billboard)	24
