= I Will Be There (Dan Seals song) =

Single by Dan Seals

from the album On the Front Line
- B-side: "Gonna Be Easy Now"
- Released: January 1987
- Genre: Country
- Length: 3:49
- Label: EMI America
- Songwriter(s): Jennifer Kimball; Tom Snow
- Producer(s): Kyle Lehning

Dan Seals singles chronology
"You Still Move Me" (1986)	"I Will Be There" (1987)	"Three Time Loser" (1987)

"I Will Be There" is a song written by Tom Snow and Jennifer Kimball, and recorded by American country music singer Dan Seals. It was released in January 1987 as the second single from his album On the Front Line. It peaked at #1 which was his fifth straight number-one single.

== Charts ==
Chart (1987)	Peak position
US Hot Country Songs (Billboard)	1
Canadian RPM Country Tracks	1
