= Don't Cheat in Our Hometown =

Single by Ricky Skaggs

from the album Don't Cheat in Our Hometown
- B-side: "Children, Go Where I Send Thee"
- Released: November 1983
- Genre: Country
- Length: 3:17
- Label: Epic
- Songwriter(s): Ray Pennington; Roy E. Marcum
- Producer(s): Ricky Skaggs

Ricky Skaggs singles chronology
"You've Got a Lover" (1983)	"Don't Cheat in Our Hometown" (1983)	"Honey (Open That Door)" (1984)

"Don't Cheat in Our Hometown" is a song written by Ray Pennington and Roy E. Marcum, and recorded by American country music artist Ricky Skaggs. It was released in November 1983 as the first single and title track from the album Don't Cheat in Our Hometown. The song was Skaggs' sixth #1 country hit. The single went to #1 for one week and spent a total of 12 weeks on the country chart.

The song was originally recorded by The Stanley Brothers in 1963 for their King Records album "The Country Folk Music Spotlight" during sessions produced by Ray Pennington.

== Chart performance ==
Chart (1983–1984)	Peak position
US Hot Country Songs (Billboard)	1
Canadian RPM Country Tracks	1
