= I Don't Want to Be a Memory =

Single by Exile

from the album Exile
- B-side: "After All These Years"
- Released: March 1984
- Genre: Country
- Length: 3:42
- Label: Epic
- Songwriters: J.P. Pennington; Sonny LeMaire
- Producer: Buddy Killen

Exile singles chronology
"Woke Up in Love" (1983)	"I Don't Want to Be a Memory" (1984)	"Give Me One More Chance" (1984)

Music video
- "I Don't Want to Be a Memory" on YouTube

"I Don't Want to Be a Memory" is a song written by J.P. Pennington and Sonny LeMaire, and recorded by American country music group Exile. It was released in March 1984 as the third single from the album Exile. The song was Exile's second number one on the country chart. The single went to number one for one week and spent a total of fourteen weeks on the country chart.

== Chart performance ==
Chart (1984)	Peak position
US Hot Country Songs (Billboard)	1
Canada Country Singles (RPM)	1
