= Uncle Pen (song) =

Single by Ricky Skaggs

from the album Don't Cheat in Our Hometown
- B-side: "I'm Head Over Heels in Love"
- Released: June 1984
- Genre: Bluegrass, country rock
- Length: 2:23
- Label: Epic
- Songwriter(s): Bill Monroe
- Producer(s): Ricky Skaggs

Ricky Skaggs singles chronology
"Honey (Open That Door)" (1984)	"Uncle Pen" (1984)	"Something in My Heart" (1984)

"Uncle Pen" is a song written and originally recorded by Bill Monroe. Besides Monroe, the song was recorded by Porter Wagoner in 1956, Goose Creek Symphony in 1971, Michael Nesmith of The Monkees in 1973 on his solo album Pretty Much Your Standard Ranch Stash, and Ricky Skaggs in 1984. The song was Skaggs' ninth #1 single on the country chart. The single went to #1 for one week and spent a total of 13 weeks on the country chart. Bill Monroe played a character named "Uncle Pen" disappointed at the citification of Ricky Skaggs in the 1985 video for "Country Boy". The improvisational-rock band Phish has performed their version of "Uncle Pen" over 200 times in the band's 30+ year career. Leon Russell recorded the song as "Hank Wilson" in 1973. Bluegrass entertainer Billy Strings and his band have covered the song at least 23 times since 2018.

== Content ==
The song was about Monroe's uncle and musical mentor, Pendleton Vandiver.

== Chart performance ==
=== Porter Wagoner ===
Chart (1956)	Peak position
US Hot Country Songs (Billboard)	14

=== Ricky Skaggs ===
Chart (1984)	Peak position
US Hot Country Songs (Billboard)	1
Canadian RPM Country Tracks	1

=== Year-end charts ===
Chart (1984)	Position
US Hot Country Songs (Billboard)	20
