= That Was a Close One =

Single by Earl Thomas Conley

from the album Too Many Times
- B-side: "Right from the Start"
- Released: March 30, 1987
- Genre: Country
- Length: 4:26
- Label: RCA
- Songwriter(s): Robert Byrne
- Producer(s): Earl Thomas Conley; Nelson Larkin; Mark Wright

Earl Thomas Conley singles chronology
"I Can't Win for Losin' You" (1986)	"That Was a Close One" (1987)	"Right from the Start" (1987)

"That Was a Close One" is a song written by Robert Byrne and recorded by American country music artist Earl Thomas Conley. It was released in March 1987 as the third single from the album Too Many Times. The song was Conley's thirteenth number one country hit. The single went to number one for one week and spent a total of thirteen weeks on the country chart.

== Charts ==
=== Weekly charts ===
Chart (1987)	Peak position
US Hot Country Songs (Billboard)	1
Canadian RPM Country Tracks	2

=== Year-end charts ===
Chart (1987)	Position
US Hot Country Songs (Billboard)	40
