= Silent Treatment (Earl Thomas Conley song) =

Single by Earl Thomas Conley

from the album Fire & Smoke
- B-side: "This I've Hurt Her More (Than She Loves Me)"
- Released: November 3, 1980
- Genre: Country
- Length: 3:14
- Label: RCA
- Songwriter: Earl Thomas Conley
- Producers: Nelson Larkin, Earl Thomas Conley

Earl Thomas Conley singles chronology
"Stranded on a Dead-End Street" (1980)	"Silent Treatment" (1980)	"Fire and Smoke" (1981)

"Silent Treatment" is a song written and recorded by American country music artist Earl Thomas Conley. It was released in November 1980 as the first single from the album Fire & Smoke. The song reached number 7 on the Billboard Hot Country Singles & Tracks chart.

== Chart performance ==
Chart (1980–1981)	Peak position
US Hot Country Songs (Billboard)	7
