= Don't Make It Easy for Me =

Single by Earl Thomas Conley

from the album Don't Make It Easy for Me
- B-side: "You Can't Go On"
- Released: January 2, 1984
- Genre: Country
- Length: 3:33
- Label: RCA
- Songwriter(s): Earl Thomas Conley; Randy Scruggs
- Producer(s): Nelson Larkin, Earl Thomas Conley

Earl Thomas Conley singles chronology
"Holding Her and Loving You" (1983)	"Don't Make It Easy for Me" (1984)	"Angel in Disguise" (1984)

"Don't Make It Easy for Me" is a song co-written and recorded by American country music artist Earl Thomas Conley. It was released in January 1984 as the third single and title track from the album Don't Make It Easy for Me. The song was Conley's fifth number one country hit. The single went to number one for one week and spent a total of twelve weeks on the country chart. The song was written by Conley and Randy Scruggs.

== Charts ==
=== Weekly charts ===
Chart (1984)	Peak position
US Hot Country Songs (Billboard)	1
Canadian RPM Country Tracks	2

=== Year-end charts ===
Chart (1984)	Position
US Hot Country Songs (Billboard)	47
