= I Can't Win for Losin' You =

Single by Earl Thomas Conley

from the album Too Many Times
- B-side: "Love's on the Move"
- Released: November 24, 1986
- Genre: Country
- Length: 4:06
- Label: RCA
- Songwriter(s): Robert Byrne; Rick Bowles
- Producer(s): Earl Thomas Conley; Nelson Larkin; Mark Wright

Earl Thomas Conley singles chronology
"Too Many Times" (1986)	"I Can't Win for Losin' You" (1986)	"That Was a Close One" (1987)

"I Can't Win for Losin' You' is a song written by Robert Byrne and Rick Bowles and recorded by American country music artist Earl Thomas Conley. It was released in November 1986 as the second single from the album Too Many Times. The song was Conley's twelfth number one country single. The single went to number one for one week and spent a total of thirteen weeks on the country chart.

== Critical reception ==
Kip Kirby of Billboard magazine reviewed the song favorably, saying that Conley "slips into a breathy, soulful voice in this R&B-flavored lament; underneath a devil-may-care exterior, he's paying dues for a love that got away."

== Charts ==
=== Weekly charts ===
Chart (1986–1987)	Peak position
US Hot Country Songs (Billboard)	1
Canadian RPM Country Tracks	3

=== Year-end charts ===
Chart (1987)	Position
US Hot Country Songs (Billboard)	38
