= You Still Move Me =

Single by Dan Seals

from the album On the Front Line
- B-side: "I'm Still Strung Out on You"
- Released: September 1986
- Genre: Country
- Length: 4:27 (radio edit); 5:07 (album version)
- Label: EMI America
- Songwriter(s): Dan Seals
- Producer(s): Kyle Lehning

Dan Seals singles chronology
"Everything That Glitters (Is Not Gold)" (1986)	"You Still Move Me" (1986)	"I Will Be There" (1987)

"You Still Move Me" is a song written and recorded by American country music artist Dan Seals. It was released in September 1986 as the lead-off single from the album On the Front Line. The song went to number one on the Billboard country charts in 1987.

== Charts ==
=== Weekly charts ===
Chart (1986–1987)	Peak position
US Hot Country Songs (Billboard)	1
Canadian RPM Country Tracks	1

=== Year-end charts ===
Chart (1987)	Position
US Hot Country Songs (Billboard)	12
