= Fire and Smoke =

Single by Earl Thomas Conley

from the album Fire & Smoke
- B-side: "I've Loved You Girl"
- Released: April 20, 1981
- Recorded: 1980
- Genre: Country
- Length: 3:11
- Label: RCA
- Songwriter: Earl Thomas Conley
- Producers: Nelson Larkin and Earl Thomas Conley

Earl Thomas Conley singles chronology
"Silent Treatment" (1980)	"Fire and Smoke" (1981)	"Tell Me Why" (1981)

"Fire and Smoke" is a song written and recorded by American country music singer Earl Thomas Conley. It was released in April 1981 as the second single and title track from the album Fire & Smoke.

The song was Conley's fourth top 40 country hit, and continued his recent run of success, which had started with the previous single, "Silent Treatment" (his first top 10 hit on the Billboard Hot Country Singles chart in the fall of 1980). "Fire and Smoke" topped the success of "Silent Treatment,". The single was his first No. 1 hit in July 1981 and spent 14 weeks in the top 40 country chart.

At the end of the year, "Fire and Smoke" was named the No. 1 song of the entire year.

== Chart performance ==
Chart (1981)	Peak position
US Hot Country Songs (Billboard)	1
