= Woke Up in Love (Exile song) =

1983 song by Exile

Single by Exile

from the album Exile
- B-side: "First Thing First"
- Released: November 1983
- Genre: Country
- Length: 3:09
- Label: Epic
- Songwriter(s): J.P. Pennington
- Producer(s): Buddy Killen

Exile singles chronology
"High Cost of Leaving" (1983)	"Woke Up in Love" (1983)	"I Don't Want to Be a Memory" (1984)

"Woke Up in Love" is a song written by J.P. Pennington, and recorded by American country music group Exile. It was released in November 1983 as the second single from the album Exile. The song was Exile's second country hit and the first of ten number one singles on the country chart. The single went to number one for one week and spent a total of twelve weeks on the country chart.

== Background ==
Exile had been performing since the mid-1960s, both as a touring and recording act. After adopting a pop-rock style in the early 1970s, the group reached the peak of its success in 1978 with the song "Kiss You All Over"; that song spent four weeks at No. 1 on the Billboard Hot 100. Subsequent singles fared far less successfully.

In the early 1980s, with Les Taylor replacing the departed Jimmy Stokley as lead singer, Exile began a transition to country music, with elements of strong Southern rock flavor. In 1983, the newly revamped group released its first country chart single, "High Cost Of Leaving," which reached No. 27 on the Hot Country Singles chart that summer. That paved the way for "Woke Up In Love," which reached No. 1 in the late winter of 1984 and began a string of 10 No. 1 songs on the Hot Country Singles chart, the first seven of them in as many single releases.

== Charts ==
=== Weekly charts ===
Weekly chart performance for "Woke Up in Love"
Chart (1983–1984)	Peak position
Canadian RPM Country Tracks	1
US Hot Country Songs (Billboard)	1

=== Year-end charts ===
Year-end chart performance for "Woke Up in Love"
Chart (1984)	Position
US Hot Country Songs (Billboard)	17
