= Angel in Disguise (Earl Thomas Conley song) =

Single by Earl Thomas Conley

from the album Don't Make It Easy for Me
- B-side: "Crowd Around the Corner"
- Released: April 30, 1984
- Genre: Country pop
- Length: 3:30
- Label: RCA
- Songwriter(s): Earl Thomas Conley; Randy Scruggs
- Producer(s): Earl Thomas Conley; Nelson Larkin; Arranger: Ron Oates

Earl Thomas Conley singles chronology
"Don't Make It Easy for Me" (1984)	"Angel in Disguise" (1984)	"Chance of Lovin' You" (1984)

"Angel in Disguise" is a song co-written and recorded by American country music artist Earl Thomas Conley. It was released in April 1984 as the fourth and final single from the album Don't Make It Easy for Me. The song was Conley's sixth No. 1 country single, having reached the top spot for one week and spending a total of thirteen weeks on the chart. The song was written by Conley and Randy Scruggs

As the fourth single to reach No. 1 from Conley's album Don't Make It Easy for Me, "Angel in Disguise" made Conley the first artist in any genre to chart four No. 1 hits from the same album.

== Music video ==
A video, directed by David Hogan, was produced for the song, depicting a middle-aged man (Conley) fantasizing about being in a relationship with an attractive woman; at the end of the video, he is visited by several of the descriptive women, most notably one who has shaved the sides of her head. The video was aired on The Nashville Network, CMT and Great American Country, and is available for viewing online via Vevo as of 2018.

A video was also filmed for the single's B-side "Crowd Around the Corner." The video, also directed by Hogan, depicts an elderly man sneaking out of a retirement home to enjoy one last glimpse of life before dying.

== Charts ==
=== Weekly charts ===
Chart (1984)	Peak position
US Hot Country Songs (Billboard)	1
Canadian RPM Country Tracks	1

=== Year-end charts ===
Chart (1984)	Position
US Hot Country Songs (Billboard)	10
