= Chance of Lovin' You =

Single by Earl Thomas Conley

from the album Treadin' Water
- B-side: "Feels Like a Saturday Night"
- Released: August 27, 1984
- Genre: Country pop
- Length: 2:58
- Label: RCA
- Songwriters: Earl Thomas Conley; Randy Scruggs
- Producer: Nelson Larkin

Earl Thomas Conley singles chronology
"Angel in Disguise" (1984)	"Chance of Lovin' You" (1984)	"All Tangled Up in Love" (1984)

"Chance of Lovin' You" is a song co-written and recorded by American country music artist Earl Thomas Conley. It was released in August 1984 as the lead single from the album Treadin' Water. The song was Conley's seventh number one country hit. The single went to number one for one week and spent a total of fourteen weeks on the country chart. The song was written by Conley and Randy Scruggs.

== Chart performance ==
Chart (1984)	Peak position
US Hot Country Songs (Billboard)	1
Canadian RPM Country Tracks	1
