= Randy Scruggs =

American guitarist and songwriter (1953–2018)

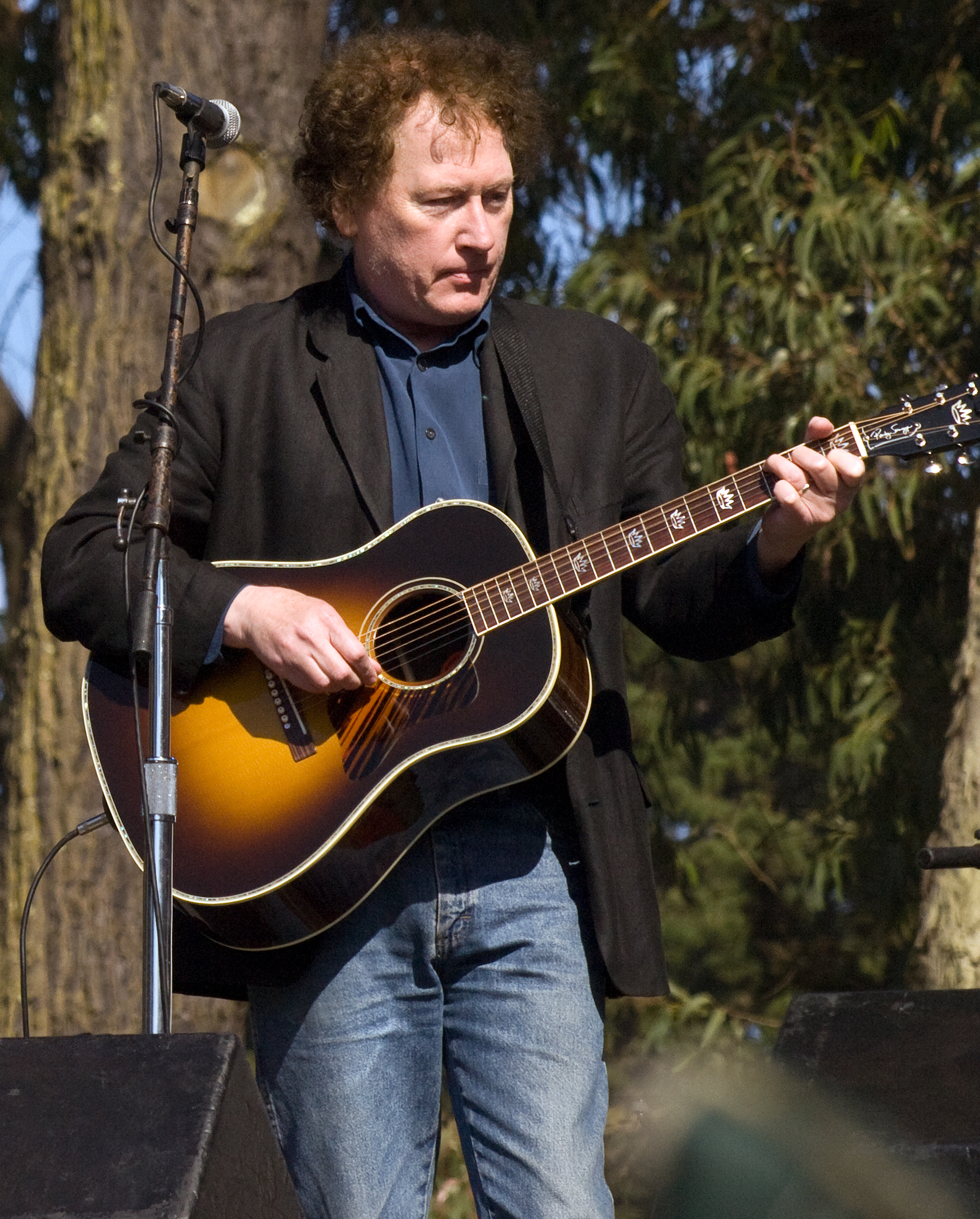
- Scruggs performing in 2009

Background information
- Born: Randy Lynn Scruggs; August 3, 1953; Nashville, Tennessee, U.S.
- Died: April 17, 2018 (aged 64)
- Genres: Country
- Occupations: Music producer; songwriter; musician
- Instrument: Guitar
- Years active: 1970–2018

Randy Lynn Scruggs (August 3, 1953 – April 17, 2018) was an American music producer, songwriter and guitarist. He had his first recording at the age of 13. He won four Grammy Awards and was named Musician of the Year at the Country Music Association Awards three times. He was the middle son of Earl Scruggs and Louise Scruggs.

== Career ==
Scruggs' career began in 1970 with the release of All the Way Home, a collaboration with his older brother Gary. He played the electric bass on John Hartford's 1971 album Aereo-Plain.

In 1972, Scruggs released an album recorded with Gary, The Scruggs Brothers. Reviewing in Christgau's Record Guide: Rock Albums of the Seventies (1981), Robert Christgau said: "Significant that two musicians so close to the Flatt-picking roots—though it ought to be remembered that their father is an entertainer, not a mountaineer—have put together such a doleful-sounding country-rock band in the face of the good-time sippin'-that-wine stuff the more famous guys are selling."

As a songwriter, Scruggs's credits include "We Danced Anyway", "Love Don't Care (Whose Heart It Breaks)", "Love Has No Right", "Don't Make It Easy for Me", "Chance of Lovin' You", and "Angel in Disguise". He also co-wrote a contemporary Christian music hit, "Sanctuary", with John W. Thompson.

Scruggs worked with many artists, including Michael Card, The Talbot Brothers, Waylon Jennings, Earl Thomas Conley, George Strait and Emmylou Harris.

In 1994, Scruggs teamed with Earl Scruggs and Doc Watson to contribute the song "Keep on the Sunny Side" to the AIDS benefit album Red Hot + Country produced by the Red Hot Organization. Scruggs recorded his debut solo LP Crown of Jewels in 1998.

Scruggs died after a short illness on April 17, 2018, at the age of 64.

== Scruggs Sound Studio ==
In 1980, Scruggs established Scruggs Sound Studio, a recording studio located in Berry Hill, Tennessee. The studio was the location where the Nitty Gritty Dirt Band recorded Will the Circle Be Unbroken: Volume Two (1989) and its followup in 2002, as well as Keith Whitley: A Tribute Album (1994). Other artists recording at the studio included Toby Keith, Donna Ulisse, John Michael Montgomery, and others. In 2018, Scruggs sold the studio to Johnny Reid, who renovated and reopened it as Soultrain Sound Studios in 2020.

== Awards and honors ==
2002 Best Country Instrumental Performance: Earl Scruggs, Gary Scruggs, Randy Scruggs, Steve Martin, Leon Russell, Vince Gill, Jerry Douglas, Glen Duncan, Albert Lee, Paul Shaffer and Marty Stuart – "Foggy Mountain Breakdown"

== Discography ==
=== Albums ===
Title	Album details
All The Way Home (Original title: Second Generation Scruggs)	Artist: Randy & Gary Scruggs; Released: 1970; Label: Vanguard Records; Producer: Herb Gart and Charlie Daniels
The Scruggs Brothers	Artist: Gary and Randy Scruggs; Released: 1972; Label: Vanguard Records
Crown of Jewels	Release date: June 23, 1998; Label: Reprise Records

=== Singles ===
Year	Single	Peak positions	Album
Year	Single	US Country	Album
1998	"It's Only Love" (with Mary Chapin Carpenter)	67	Crown of Jewels
