= Earl Thomas Conley =

American country music singer-songwriter (1941–2019)

- A promotional photo of Earl Thomas Conley.

Background information
- Also known as: Earl Conley
- Born: October 17, 1941; Portsmouth, Ohio, U.S.
- Died: April 10, 2019 (aged 77) Nashville, Tennessee, U.S.
- Genres: Country
- Occupation: Singer
- Instruments: Vocals; guitar
- Years active: 1974–2019
- Labels: GRT; Warner Bros.; Sunbird; RCA

Earl Thomas Conley (October 17, 1941 – April 10, 2019) was an American country music singer-songwriter. Between 1980 and 2003, he recorded ten studio albums, including seven for RCA Records. In the 1980s and into the 1990s, Conley also charted more than 30 singles on the Billboard Hot Country Songs chart, of which 18 reached Number One. His 18 Billboard Number One country singles during the 1980s were the third most by any artist in any genre during that decade, after Alabama and Ronnie Milsap.

== Biography ==
=== Early life ===
Conley was born October 17, 1941, in Portsmouth, Ohio, to Glenna Ruth (née Davis; 1918–2002) and Arthur Conley (1910–1989). When he was 14, his father lost his job with the railroad, forcing the young boy to move in with his older sister in Jamestown, Ohio. He was offered a scholarship to an art school, but rejected it in favor of joining the U.S. Army. While in the Army, he became a member of a Christian-influenced trio, where his musical talent and vocal ability first became apparent. He then decided to consider performing as a serious career option. He shifted more deeply into the classic country sounds of artists such as Merle Haggard and George Jones. During this period he first tried his hand at songwriting. In 1968, after his honorable discharge from the Army, he began commuting from Dayton to Nashville. In 1973 while in Nashville, he met Dick Heard, who produced country music singer Mel Street. This meeting eventually led to the Conley-Heard collaboration on the song "Smokey Mountain Memories", which made the top 10 for Street. After his discharge from the military, Conley had been playing in clubs in Nashville at night, supporting himself by working blue-collar jobs during the day.

=== Career ===
In his early days before fame, Conley worked in a steel mill near Portsmouth, Ohio. Until one day he made the bold decision to pack up and move to Nashville. Feeling that he was not making any progress in Nashville, Conley moved to Huntsville, Alabama. There, he met record producer Nelson Larkin, who helped him sign with independent record label GRT in 1974. Conley released four singles on that label, none of which became hits. At the same time, he was selling songs that he had written to other artists, including Conway Twitty and Mel Street, who were having much success with them.

Conley returned to Nashville, now writing for Nelson Larkin's publishing house. In 1979, he signed a recording contract with Warner Bros. Records. Two years later, he had his first Top 40 hit, "Dreamin's All I Do". He left the label in 1979 and joined Sunbird Records, where he again worked with Larkin. This time, Conley found success with a Top Ten and a Number One single within the next two years. He continued to have success over the next few years and in 1983 he was nominated for multiple Grammy Awards for his song "Holding Her and Loving You". He set a record the following year as the first artist in any genre to have four Number One singles from the same album, Don't Make It Easy for Me that was released in May 1983. In 1986, Conley was credited with breaking down country music barriers in his duet with pop/R&B singer Anita Pointer of the Grammy-winning Pointer Sisters. Their single, "Too Many Times", the title track to his 1986 album, reached No. 2 on the Country chart. With the song, Conley also became the only country artist to appear on the syndicated music program Soul Train.

=== Later years and death ===
By the end of the 1980s, Conley began collaborating with Randy Scruggs, son of banjo virtuoso Earl Scruggs, in the hope that he could bring his music back to his country roots. His record sales began to drop in the 1990s, as country took a more progressive turn, and Conley was dropped from his record label in 1992. He took a seven-year recording hiatus between 1991 and 1997 due to a number of factors, including vocal problems, disenchantment with record label politics, road fatigue, and mental burnout. He began recording again in 1998.

In 2002, Blake Shelton charted in the Top 20 with "All Over Me", which Conley co-wrote with Shelton and longtime friend, songwriter Michael Pyle.

In late 2013, Conley gave a telephone interview with Pods o' Pop. Conley recalled that he may have been the only country artist to have appeared on the Soul Train television program (he performed his duet with Pointer) and went into detail about the string of hits Randy Scruggs and he co-wrote.

Conley died on April 10, 2019, from cerebral atrophy.
