= Ed Bruce discography =

- Studio albums: 22
- Compilation albums: 5
- Singles: 51
- No.1 Single: 1

This is a comprehensive listing of official releases by Ed Bruce, an American country music songwriter and singer. He released twenty-two country studio albums, two Christian studio albums, two rock singles, and 51 Country music singles.

His best known song is "Mammas Don't Let Your Babies Grow Up to Be Cowboys".

== Albums and compilations ==
Year	Title	US Country
1968	If I Could Just Go Home	44
1969	Shades of Ed Bruce	—
1976	Ed Bruce (1976 album)	
1977	The Tennessean	—
1978	Cowboys & Dreamers	—
1979	Taste of Honey	—
1980	Ed Bruce (1980 album)	22
1980	King of the Road	—
1981	One to One	29
1982	Last Train to Clarkesville	—
1982	I Write It Down	63
1983	You're Not Leavin' Here Tonight	35
1983	The Singing Sheriff of the TV Series 'MAVERICK'	—
1984	Tell 'em I've Gone Crazy	—
1984	Homecoming	41
1985	Greatest Hits	—
1986	Night Things	53
1986	Rock Boppin' Baby	—
1986	Thirty-Nine and Holding	—
1995	Puzzles	—
1995	The Best of Ed Bruce	—
1997	Set Me Free	—
2002	This Old Hat	—
2003	12 Classics	—
2004	Changed	—
2006	Ed Bruce (A.K.A Edwin Bruce) Selected Hits	—
2007	Cowboys	—
2007	Sing About Jesus	—
2008	Country Hits	—
2010	In Jesus' Eyes - Songs of Inspiration	—
2011	The Last Cowboy Song	—
2013	Country Hits	—
2015	Back to Back	—
2017	Ed Bruce Live from Church Street Station	—
2018	Girls, Women & Ladies	—
2018	The Last Cowboy Song	—
2019	Ed Bruce Meets Faron Young	—
2021	See The Big Man Cry	—
2024	After Hours (posthumous)	—
2024	Have You Heard (posthumous)	—

== Singles ==
=== 1950s and 1960s ===
Year	Single	Peak positions	Album
Year	Single	US Country	Album
1957	"Rockin' Boppin' Baby"	—	—N/a
1958	"Sweet Woman"	—	—N/a
1961	"Flight 303"	—	—N/a
1963	"It's Coming to Me"	—	—N/a
1963	"See the Big Man Cry"^{[A]}	—	—N/a
1964	"Don't Let It Happen"	—	—N/a
1964	"I'm Gonna Have a Party"	—	—N/a
1964	"He Gave Her to Me"	—	—N/a
1966	"Unbreakable Heart"	—	—N/a
1966	"Walker's Woods"	57	If I Could Just Go Home
1967	"Last Train to Clarksville"	69	—N/a
1967	"If I Could Just Go Home"	—	If I Could Just Go Home
1967	"Her Sweet Love and the Baby"	—	If I Could Just Go Home
1968	"I'll Take You Away"	—	—N/a
1968	"Painted Girls and Wine"	52	—N/a
1968	"Puzzles"	—	Shades
1969	"Everybody Wants to Get to Heaven"	52	Shades
1969	"Hey Porter"	—	—N/a
"—" denotes releases that did not chart

=== 1970s ===
Year	Single	Peak chart positions		Album
Year	Single	US Country	CAN Country	Album
1973	"Good Jelly Jones"	—	—	—N/a
1973	"July You're a Woman"	77	—	—N/a
1974	"Devil Ain't a Lonely Woman's Friend"	—	—	—N/a
1975	"Mammas Don't Let Your Babies Grow Up to Be Cowboys"	15	36	Ed Bruce (United Artists)
1976	"Littlest Cowboy Rides Again"	32	—	Ed Bruce (United Artists)
1976	"For Love's Own Sake"	36	—	Ed Bruce (United Artists)
1976	"Sleep All Morning"	57	—	Ed Bruce (United Artists)
1976	"Wide Open Spaces and Cowboys Are Gone"	—	—	—N/a
1977	"Texas (When I Die)"	52	—	Tennessean
1977	"Star-Studded Nights"	54	—	Tennessean
1978	"Love Somebody to Death"	57	—	Tennessean
1978	"Man Made of Glass"	94	—	Tennessean
1978	"The Man That Turned My Mama On"	70	—	Cowboys and Dreamers
1978	"Angeline"	60	—	Cowboys and Dreamers
"—" denotes releases that did not chart

=== 1980s ===
Year	Single	Peak chart positions		Album
Year	Single	US Country	CAN Country	Album
1980	"Diane"	21	65	Ed Bruce (MCA)
1980	"The Last Cowboy Song" (with Willie Nelson)	12	39	Ed Bruce (MCA)
1980	"Girls, Women and Ladies"	14	—	Ed Bruce (MCA)
1981	"Evil Angel"	24	—	One to One
1981	"(When You Fall in Love) Everything's a Waltz"	14	12	One to One
1981	"You're the Best Break This Old Heart Ever Had"	1	10	One to One
1982	"Love's Found You and Me"	13	14	One to One
1982	"Ever, Never Lovin' You"	4	4	I Write It Down
1982	"My First Taste of Texas"	6	33	I Write It Down
1983	"You're Not Leavin' Here Tonight"	21	—	You're Not Leavin' Here Tonight
1983	"If It Was Easy"	19	—	You're Not Leavin' Here Tonight
1983	"After All"	4	4	You're Not Leavin' Here Tonight
1984	"Tell 'em I've Gone Crazy"	45	44	Tell 'em I've Gone Crazy
1984	"You Turn Me On (Like a Radio)"	3	3	Homecoming
1985	"If It Ain't Love"	20	19	Homecoming
1985	"When Givin' Up Was Easy"	17	46	Homecoming
1986	"Nights"	4	11	Night Things
1986	"Fools for Each Other" (with Lynn Anderson)	49	—	Night Things
1986	"Quietly Crazy"	36	59	Night Things
"—" denotes releases that did not chart

== Notes ==
- A "See the Big Man Cry" peaked at number 9 on Bubbling Under Hot 100 Singles.
