= 1984 in country music =

This is a list of notable events in country music that took place in the year 1984.

== Events ==
- June 22 — The movie Rhinestone, starring Dolly Parton and Sylvester Stallone, is released to universally negative reviews. The much-hyped movie – about a singer's effort to transform a New York City taxicab driver into a country star within two weeks – flops, but still produces several hit singles, most notably the No. 1 hit "Tennessee Homesick Blues".
- July 28 — With his No. 1 hit "Angel in Disguise", Earl Thomas Conley becomes the first artist in any genre to have four Billboard chart-topping songs from the same album. The album in question is Don't Make it Easy For Me, and in addition to "Angel in Disguise" and the title track, Conley also hit with 1983's "Your Love's on the Line" and "Holding Her and Loving You". The feat is part of Conley's impressive 1980s streak, where he enjoyed 16 No. 1 hits through 1989.
- September 11 — Barbara Mandrell is seriously injured in a car accident. She suffers multiple injuries and takes an 18-month sabbatical from performing to recover.

== Top hits of the year ==
=== Singles released by American artists ===
US	CAN	Single	Artist
4	4	After All	Ed Bruce
10	6	All My Rowdy Friends Are Coming Over Tonight	Hank Williams, Jr.
6	—	America	Waylon Jennings
1	1	Angel in Disguise	Earl Thomas Conley
10	20	Another Motel Memory	Shelly West
1	1	As Long as I'm Rockin' with You	John Conlee
3	2	Atlanta Blue	The Statler Brothers
5	7	Attitude Adjustment	Hank Williams, Jr.
3	2	B-B-B-Burnin' Up with Love	Eddie Rabbitt
7	10	Between Two Fires	Gary Morris
19	26	Boys Like You	Gail Davies
3	2	Buried Treasure	Kenny Rogers
5	3	Candy Man	Charly McClain & Mickey Gilley
1	1	Chance of Lovin' You	Earl Thomas Conley
1	1	City of New Orleans	Willie Nelson
11	10	Crossword Puzzle	Barbara Mandrell
7	5	Denver	Larry Gatlin & The Gatlin Brothers
9	4	Diamond in the Dust	Mark Gray
12	11	Disenchanted	Michael Martin Murphey
1	1	Don't Cheat in Our Hometown	Ricky Skaggs
1	2	Don't Make It Easy for Me	Earl Thomas Conley
8	14	Double Shot (Of My Baby's Love)	Joe Stampley
36	20	Downtown	Dolly Parton
18	—	Dream On Texas Ladies	Rex Allen, Jr.
10	8	Drinkin' My Way Back Home	Gene Watson
26	13	Drivin' Wheel	Emmylou Harris
1	12	Elizabeth	The Statler Brothers
11	14	Evening Star	Kenny Rogers
2	7	Ev'ry Heart Should Have One	Charley Pride
1	1	Everyday	The Oak Ridge Boys
10	16	Faithless Love	Glen Campbell
3	5	Fool's Gold	Lee Greenwood
10	18	Forever Again	Gene Watson
14	30	Forever You	The Whites
5	13	Forget About Me	The Bellamy Brothers
10	16	Give Me Back That Old Familiar Feeling	The Whites
1	1	Give Me One More Chance	Exile
7	—	God Bless the USA	Lee Greenwood
10	8	God Must Be a Cowboy	Dan Seals
10	8	God Won't Get You	Dolly Parton
1	1	Going, Going, Gone	Lee Greenwood
17	15	Had a Dream (For the Heart)	The Judds
3	18	Happy Birthday Dear Heartache	Barbara Mandrell
15	19	He Broke Your Memory Last Night	Reba McEntire
1	1	Honey (Open That Door)	Ricky Skaggs
9	29	I Call It Love	Mel McDaniel
1	1	I Can Tell By the Way You Dance (You're Gonna Love Me Tonight)	Vern Gosdin
6	6	I Could'a Had You	Leon Everette
9	6	I Could Use Another You	Eddy Raven
1	1	I Don't Know a Thing About Love (The Moon Song)	Conway Twitty
2	1	I Don't Wanna Lose Your Love	Crystal Gayle
1	1	I Don't Want to Be a Memory	Exile
7	6	I Dream of Women Like You	Ronnie McDowell
8	4	I Got a Million of 'Em	Ronnie McDowell
1	1	I Got Mexico	Eddy Raven
1	1	I Guess It Never Hurts to Hurt Sometimes	The Oak Ridge Boys
10	17	I Hurt for You	Deborah Allen
3	3	I Love Only You	Nitty Gritty Dirt Band
4	4	I May Be Used (But Baby I Ain't Used Up)	Waylon Jennings
3	2	I Never Quite Got Back (From Loving You)	Sylvia
17	22	I Still Do	Bill Medley
14	12	I Wish I Could Write You a Song	John Anderson
7	8	I'm Not Through Loving You Yet	Louise Mandrell
1	1	I've Been Around Enough to Know	John Schneider
13	—	I've Been Rained on Too	Tom Jones
2	1	I've Been Wrong Before	Deborah Allen
9	6	If All the Magic Is Gone	Mark Gray
10	10	If I Could Only Dance with You	Jim Glaser
8	6	If the Fall Don't Get You	Janie Fricke
1	1	If You're Gonna Play in Texas (You Gotta Have a Fiddle in the Band)	Alabama
9	6	In My Dreams	Emmylou Harris
1	2	In My Eyes	John Conlee
14	32	In the Midnight Hour	Razzy Bailey
13	40	It's a Be Together Night	David Frizzell & Shelly West
20	38	Jagged Edge of a Broken Heart	Gail Davies
5	37	Just a Little Love	Reba McEntire
3	2	The Lady Takes the Cowboy Everytime	Larry Gatlin & the Gatlin Brothers
10	28	Left Side of the Bed	Mark Gray
10	10	Let Somebody Else Drive	John Anderson
1	9	Let's Chase Each Other Around the Room	Merle Haggard
1	1	Let's Fall to Pieces Together	George Strait
1	1	Let's Stop Talkin' About It	Janie Fricke
4	3	Lonely Women Make Good Lovers	Steve Wariner
1	2	Long Hard Road (The Sharecropper's Dream)	Nitty Gritty Dirt Band
11	13	Maggie's Dream	Don Williams
12	11	Make My Day	T. G. Sheppard with Clint Eastwood
1	1	Mama He's Crazy	The Judds
3	4	Man of Steel	Hank Williams, Jr.
2	1	Mona Lisa Lost Her Smile	David Allan Coe
15	35	My Baby's Gone	The Kendalls
6	2	Never Could Toe the Mark	Waylon Jennings
7	10	New Patches	Mel Tillis
10	1	Nothing Like Falling in Love	Eddie Rabbitt
8	20	One Takes the Blame	The Statler Brothers
2	1	Only a Lonely Heart Knows	Barbara Mandrell
5	1	Ozark Mountain Jubilee	The Oak Ridge Boys
10	12	Pins & Needles	The Whites
9	9	Pledging My Love	Emmylou Harris
9	11	The Power of Love	Charley Pride
6	9	Prisoner of the Highway	Ronnie Milsap
8	5	P.S. I Love You	Tom T. Hall
19	30	Radio Land	Michael Martin Murphey
1	1	Right or Wrong	George Strait
14	7	The Right Stuff	Charly McClain & Mickey Gilley
14	15	Rock & Roll Shoes	Ray Charles with B. J. Thomas
1	1	Roll On (Eighteen Wheeler)	Alabama
13	10	Runaway Heart	Louise Mandrell
3	2	Save the Last Dance for Me	Dolly Parton
7	6	Second Hand Heart	Gary Morris
3	3	Sentimental Ol' You	Charly McClain
3	4	She Sure Got Away with My Heart	John Anderson
1	1	Show Her	Ronnie Milsap
20	20	Silent Partners	David Frizzell & Shelly West
1	1	Slow Burn	T. G. Sheppard
1	3	Somebody's Needin' Somebody	Conway Twitty
1	1	Someday When Things Are Good	Merle Haggard
3	5	Somewhere Down the Line	T. G. Sheppard
1	9	The Sound of Goodbye	Crystal Gayle
1	3	Stay Young	Don Williams
1	1	Still Losing You	Ronnie Milsap
24	18	Stuck on You	Lionel Richie
5	2	Sweet Country Music	Atlanta
8	1	Take It to the Limit	Willie Nelson with Waylon Jennings
1	1	Tennessee Homesick Blues	Dolly Parton
1	16	Thank God for the Radio	The Kendalls
1	1	That's the Thing About Love	Don Williams
1	1	That's the Way Love Goes	Merle Haggard
12	33	There Ain't No Future in This	Reba McEntire
7	4	Three Times a Lady	Conway Twitty
28	30	Till Your Memory's Gone	Bill Medley
1	1	To All the Girls I've Loved Before	Julio Iglesias & Willie Nelson
3	5	To Me	Barbara Mandrell & Lee Greenwood
19	29	Together Again	Kenny Rogers & Dottie West
19	14	Tonight I'm Here with Someone Else	Karen Brooks
4	1	Too Good to Stop Now	Mickey Gilley
15	32	Too Late to Go Home	Johnny Rodriguez
1	1	Turning Away	Crystal Gayle
3	1	Two Car Garage	B. J. Thomas
1	1	Uncle Pen	Ricky Skaggs
24	19	Victims of Goodbye	Sylvia
4	2	Way Back	John Conlee
6	7	We Didn't See a Thing	Ray Charles with George Jones
10	9	What Would Your Memories Do	Vern Gosdin
19	—	Whatever Turns You On	Keith Stegall
1	1	When We Make Love	Alabama
8	8	Where's the Dress	Moe Bandy & Joe Stampley
10	15	The Whole World's in Love When You're Lonely	B. J. Thomas
12	16	Why Goodbye	Steve Wariner
4	6	Why Lady Why	Gary Morris
1	3	Why Not Me	The Judds
7	5	Will It Be Love by Morning	Michael Martin Murphey
11	3	Without a Song	Willie Nelson
1	1	Woke Up in Love	Exile
12	12	Woman Your Love	Moe Bandy
6	45	World's Greatest Lover	The Bellamy Brothers
18	—	Wounded Hearts	Mark Gray
1	1	The Yellow Rose	Johnny Lee with Lane Brody
9	6	(You Bring Out) The Wild Side of Me	Dan Seals
1	2	You Could've Heard a Heart Break	Johnny Lee
1	1	You Look So Good in Love	George Strait
3	4	You Made a Wanted Man of Me	Ronnie McDowell
20	27	You Were a Good Friend	Kenny Rogers
1	3	You're Gettin' to Me Again	Jim Glaser
9	—	You're Welcome to Tonight	Lynn Anderson with Gary Morris
2	1	You've Really Got a Hold on Me	Mickey Gilley
3	6	You've Still Got a Place in My Heart	George Jones
1	1	Your Heart's Not in It	Janie Fricke

=== Singles released by Canadian artists ===
US	CAN	Single	Artist
—	15	Change of Heart	Paul Weber
—	17	The Closest Thing to You	Terry Carisse
—	14	Get Along Little Doggie	Dallas Harms
—	16	Hand Me Down Heart	Roni Sommers
—	10	Heart on the Run	Carroll Baker
—	19	I Can't Say No	Paul Weber
—	6	If This Is Love	Ronnie Prophet with Glory-Anne Carriere
1	1	Just Another Woman in Love	Anne Murray
—	9	Leader of the Band	Mercey Brothers
—	8	Love at Last Sight	Mercey Brothers
—	19	Midnight Invitation	Terry Sumsion
1	1	Nobody Loves Me Like You Do	Anne Murray & Dave Loggins
—	7	Nothing Good About Goodbye	Gilles Godard with Kelita Haverland
—	19	Railroad Man	Murray McLauchlan
—	18	Red River Flood	Murray McLauchlan
56	5	Repeat After Me	Family Brown
—	16	Song for Davey	Albert Hall

== Top new album releases ==
US	Album	Artist	Record label
8	Atlanta Blue	The Statler Brothers	Mercury/PolyGram
18	The Best of Don Williams Volume III	Don Williams	MCA
20	The Best of Michael Martin Murphey	Michael Martin Murphey	EMI America
22	The Best Year of My Life	Eddie Rabbitt	Warner Bros.
14	Blue Highway	John Conlee	MCA
18	By Heart	Conway Twitty	Warner Bros.
13	Cafe Carolina	Don Williams	MCA
1	City of New Orleans	Willie Nelson	Columbia
8	Clean Cut	Barbara Mandrell	MCA
25	Conway's Latest Greatest Hits Volume 1	Conway Twitty	Warner Bros.
1	Country Boy	Ricky Skaggs	Epic
1	Does Fort Worth Ever Cross Your Mind	George Strait	MCA
25	Doin' What I Feel	Leon Everette	RCA
24	EB 84	The Everly Brothers	Mercury/PolyGram
3	Eye of a Hurricane	John Anderson	Warner Bros.
12	Faded Blue	Gary Morris	Warner Bros.
17	The First Word in Memory	Janie Fricke	Columbia
22	Forever You	The Whites	MCA
1	Friendship	Ray Charles	Columbia
21	The Good Ol' Boys – Alive and Well	Moe Bandy & Joe Stampley	Columbia
7	The Great Pretender	Dolly Parton	RCA
2	Greatest Hits 2	The Oak Ridge Boys	MCA
3	He Thinks He's Ray Stevens	Ray Stevens	MCA
4	Heart Over Mind	Anne Murray	Capitol
21	Heartaches, Love & Stuff	Gene Watson	MCA
9	Houston to Denver	Larry Gatlin and the Gatlin Brothers	Columbia
7	It Takes Believers	Mickey Gilley & Charly McClain	Epic
1	It's All in the Game	Merle Haggard	Epic
23	Just a Little Love	Reba McEntire	MCA
22	Just Divorced	David Allan Coe	Columbia
1	Kentucky Hearts	Exile	Epic
25	Ladies' Choice	George Jones	Epic
1	Major Moves	Hank Williams, Jr.	Curb/Warner Bros.
5	Meant for Each Other	Barbara Mandrell & Lee Greenwood	MCA
21	Music from Songwriter	Willie Nelson & Kris Kristofferson	Columbia
13	My Kind of Country	Reba McEntire	MCA
20	Never Could Toe the Mark	Waylon Jennings	RCA
12	Once Upon a Christmas	Kenny Rogers & Dolly Parton	RCA
10	One More Try for Love	Ronnie Milsap	RCA
8	Pictures	Atlanta	MCA
8	Plain Dirt Fashion	Nitty Gritty Dirt Band	Warner Bros.
24	Profile II: The Best of Emmylou Harris	Emmylou Harris	Warner Bros.
22	Restless	The Bellamy Brothers	Curb/MCA
18	Riddles in the Sand	Jimmy Buffett	MCA
1	Roll On	Alabama	RCA
24	San Antone	Dan Seals	Capitol
17	There Is a Season	Vern Gosdin	Compleat
23	'Til the Bars Burn Down	Johnny Lee	Warner Bros.
4	Too Good to Stop Now	John Schneider	MCA
2	Treadin' Water	Earl Thomas Conley	RCA
9	What About Me?	Kenny Rogers	RCA
1	Why Not Me	The Judds	Curb/RCA
23	Workin' for a Livin'	Johnny Lee	Warner Bros.
6	You've Got a Good Love Comin'	Lee Greenwood	MCA
17	You've Still Got a Place in My Heart	George Jones	Epic

=== Other top albums ===
US	Album	Artist	Record label
47	Building Bridges	Larry Willoughby	Atlantic America
33	By Request	George Jones	Epic
55	Can't Slow Down	Lionel Richie	Motown
42	Can't Wait All Night	Juice Newton	RCA
29	Charly	Charly McClain	Epic
31	Christmas at Our House	Barbara Mandrell	MCA
56	Day by Day	McGuffey Lane	Atlantic America
55	Do I Ever Cross Your Mind	Ray Charles	Columbia
43	Duets	Kenny Rogers, Sheena Easton; Dottie West & Kim Carnes	Liberty
55	Easy Street	The Wright Brothers	Mercury/PolyGram
63	Fallen Angel	Gus Hardin	RCA
45	First Time Live	George Jones	Epic
35	Foolin' with Fire	Johnny Rodriguez	Epic
46	For the Record: The First 10 Years	David Allan Coe	Columbia
55	A Golden Celebration	Elvis Presley	RCA
45	Golden Duets–The Best of Frizzell & West	David Frizzell & Shelly West	Viva
28	Greatest Hits	John Anderson	Warner Bros.
64	Greatest Hits	Juice Newton	Capitol
40	Hearts on Fire	Karen Brooks	Warner Bros.
57	Highrollin'	The Maines Brothers Band	Mercury/PolyGram
41	His Epic Hits: The First 11 (To Be Continued...)	Merle Haggard	Epic
41	Homecoming	Ed Bruce	RCA
41	I Could Use Another You	Eddy Raven	RCA
58	I Still Do	Bill Medley	RCA
54	I'm Not Through Loving You Yet	Louise Mandrell	RCA
33	In Session	David Frizzell & Shelly West	Viva
41	Julio	Julio Iglesias	Columbia
63	Karen	Karen Taylor-Good	Mesa
42	Kathy Mattea	Kathy Mattea	Mercury/PolyGram
52	Let Me Be the First	Deborah Allen	RCA
30	Letter to Home	Glen Campbell	Atlantic America
34	Little by Little	Gene Watson	MCA
40	Love Is on the Radio	Tom Jones	Mercury/PolyGram
26	Magic	Mark Gray	Columbia
64	Mel McDaniel with Oklahoma Wind	Mel McDaniel	Capitol
36	The Midnight Hour	Razzy Bailey	RCA
45	Motel Matches	Moe Bandy	Columbia
42	Natural Dreams	Tom T. Hall	Mercury/PolyGram
62	New Beginnings	David Wills	RCA
34	New Patches	Mel Tillis	MCA
26	One Owner Heart	T. G. Sheppard	Warner Bros.
57	One Way Rider	The Osmond Brothers	Warner Bros./Curb
49	Power of Love	Charley Pride	RCA
32	Rhinestone (Soundtrack)	Dolly Parton and various artists	RCA
40	Shining	B. J. Thomas	Columbia
65	Soft Talk	Mac Davis	Casablanca
40	Surprise	Sylvia	RCA
56	Ten Years of Hits	Mickey Gilley	Epic
33	This Ol' Piano	Mark Gray	Columbia
34	Too Good to Stop Now	Mickey Gilley	Epic
64	Turn Me Loose	Vince Gill	RCA
27	Waylon's Greatest Hits, Vol. 2	Waylon Jennings	RCA
57	Where Is a Woman to Go	Gail Davies	RCA
33	Willing	Ronnie McDowell	Epic
47	Writers in Disguise	Pinkard & Bowden	Warner Bros.
61	You and I – Classic Country Duets	Various Artists	Warner Bros.

== On television ==
=== Regular series ===
- Hee Haw (1969–1993, syndicated)
- That Nashville Music (1970–1985, syndicated)

== Births ==
- February 5 – Tyler Farr, singer-songwriter since the mid-2010s, with hits including "Whiskey in My Water" and "Redneck Crazy".
- March 10 – Ruthie Collins, singer-songwriter and recording artist based in Nashville, Tennessee.
- March 30 – Justin Moore, singer-songwriter from the late 2000s onward, who had hits including "Small Town USA" and "If Heaven Wasn't So Far Away".
- April 19 – Matt Stell, singer-songwriter better known for his 2019 single "Prayed for You".
- August 3 – Whitney Duncan, country music singer and reality TV contestant.
- November 26 – Mike Gossin, member of Gloriana.
- December 8 – Sam Hunt, singer-songwriter of the 2010s ("Leave the Night On").

== Deaths ==
- January 28 — Al Dexter, 81, early honky tonk stylist best known for "Pistol Packin' Mama."
- May 11 — Nudie Cohen, 81, famous costume designer for country stars.
- July 30 - Jack Benny Lynn, 34, Son of Loretta Lynn and Oliver Lynn passes away after trying to ford the duck river at his parents Ranch in Hurricane Mills, TN. Lynn was 34 years of age and left behind a wife and 2 children. His mother, Loretta Lynn would not perform for another year after his death.
- September 6 — Ernest Tubb, 70, the "Texas Trubador" and a superstar since the 1940s (emphysema).
- December 26 — Sheila Andrews, 31, late 70s singer with several minor hits.

== Hall of Fame inductees ==
=== Country Music Hall of Fame inductees ===
- Ralph S. Peer (1892–1960)
- Floyd Tillman (1914–2003)

=== Canadian Country Music Hall of Fame inductees ===
- Wilf Carter
- Tommy Hunter
- Orval Prophet
- William Harold Moon

== Major awards ==
=== Grammy Awards ===
- Best Female Country Vocal Performance — "In My Dreams", Emmylou Harris
- Best Male Country Vocal Performance — "That's the Way Love Goes", Merle Haggard
- Best Country Performance by a Duo or Group with Vocal — "Mama He's Crazy", The Judds
- Best Country Instrumental Performance — "Wheel Hoss", Ricky Skaggs
- Best Country Song — "City of New Orleans", Steve Goodman (Performer: Willie Nelson)

=== Juno Awards ===
- Country Male Vocalist of the Year — Murray McLauchlan
- Country Female Vocalist of the Year — Anne Murray
- Country Group or Duo of the Year — The Good Brothers

=== Academy of Country Music ===
- Entertainer of the Year — Alabama
- Song of the Year — "Why Not Me", Harlan Howard, Brent Maher and Sonny Throckmorton (Performer: The Judds)
- Single of the Year — "To All the Girls I've Loved Before", Willie Nelson and Julio Iglesias
- Album of the Year — Roll On, Alabama
- Top Male Vocalist — George Strait
- Top Female Vocalist — Reba McEntire
- Top Vocal Duo — The Judds
- Top Vocal Group — Alabama
- Top New Male Vocalist — Vince Gill
- Top New Female Vocalist — Nicolette Larson
- Video of the Year — "All My Rowdy Friends Are Coming Over Tonight", Hank Williams, Jr. (Directors: John Goodhue)

=== Canadian Country Music Association ===
- Entertainer of the Year — Ronnie Prophet
- Male Artist of the Year — Terry Carisse
- Female Artist of the Year — Marie Bottrell
- Group of the Year — Family Brown
- SOCAN Song of the Year — "Jesus It's Me Again", Dick Damron (Performer: Dick Damron)
- Single of the Year — "A Little Good News", Anne Murray
- Album of the Year — Repeat After Me, Family Brown
- Top Selling Album — Eyes That See in the Dark, Kenny Rogers
- Vista Rising Star Award — Roni Summers
- Duo of the Year — Glory Anne Carriere and Ronnie Prophet

=== Country Music Association ===
- Entertainer of the Year — Alabama
- Song of the Year — "Wind Beneath My Wings", Larry Henley and Jeff Silbar (Performer: Gary Morris)
- Single of the Year — "A Little Good News", Anne Murray
- Album of the Year — A Little Good News, Anne Murray
- Male Vocalist of the Year — Lee Greenwood
- Female Vocalist of the Year — Reba McEntire
- Vocal Duo of the Year — Julio Iglesias and Willie Nelson
- Vocal Group of the Year — The Statler Brothers
- Horizon Award — The Judds
- Instrumentalist of the Year — Chet Atkins
- Instrumental Group of the Year — Ricky Skaggs Band

=== Hollywood Walk of Fame ===
Country stars who got a star in 1984

Mickey Gilley and Dolly Parton

=== Presidential Medal of Freedom ===
Country stars who were honored in 1984

Tennessee Ernie Ford

== Other links ==
- Country Music Association
- Inductees of the Country Music Hall of Fame
