= Greatest Hits (Barbara Mandrell album) =

Greatest hits album by Barbara Mandrell
- Released: February 28, 1985
- Recorded: 1978 – May 1984
- Genre: Country pop
- Length: 31:18
- Label: MCA
- Producer: Tom Collins

Barbara Mandrell chronology
Christmas at Our House (1984)	Greatest Hits (1985)	Get to the Heart (1985)

Singles from Greatest Hits
- 1. "There's No Love in Tennessee" Released: February 18, 1985

Professional ratings
Review scores
Source	Rating
Allmusic	4/5 stars

Greatest Hits is the fourth compilation album by American country music artist Barbara Mandrell. The album was produced by Tom Collins and released on MCA Records in March 1985. The album was her first compilation for MCA Records.

== Background and content ==
Greatest Hits consisted of 10 major hits Barbara Mandrell charted between 1978 and 1985, ranging from her second number 1 single in 1978, "If Loving You Is Wrong (I Don't Want to Be Right)", to 1984's "Happy Birthday Dear Heartache". It also included three additional number 1 singles by Mandrell: "Years", "I Was Country When Country Wasn't Cool" and "One of a Kind Pair of Fools". Dan Cooper of Allmusic gave the album four out of five stars but criticized her musical style: "Hank Williams definitely didn't do it this way. Nevertheless, "I Was Country When Country Wasn't Cool" summed up a lot of folks' feelings as the Travolta crowd tried to claim him as their own." The album also included "There's No Love in Tennessee", a new song recorded specifically for this collection.

== Release ==
Greatest Hits spawned one single, "There's No Love in Tennessee". The song became a Top 10 hit in 1985, peaking at #7 on the Billboard Magazine Hot Country Singles & Tracks chart and also peaked at #24 on the Canadian RPM Country Tracks chart. The album itself peaked at #27 on the Billboard Magazine Top Country Albums chart and missed the Billboard 200 albums chart, reaching #210 that year. Greatest Hits was originally released on an LP album upon its original release in 1985, with five songs on each of the record, total of 10 songs. The album was later reissued on a compact disc also under MCA.

== Track listing ==
No.	Title	Writer(s)	Length
1.	"I Was Country When Country Wasn't Cool"	Kye Fleming, Dennis Morgan	3:40
2.	"Years"	Fleming, Morgan	3:52
3.	"Wish You Were Here"	Fleming, Morgan	2:45
4.	"The Best of Strangers"	Fleming, Morgan	3:43
5.	"Happy Birthday Dear Heartache"	Mack David, Archie Jordan	2:32
6.	"If Loving You Is Wrong (I Don't Want to Be Right)"	Homer Banks, Carl Hampton, Raymond Jackson	3:05
7.	"Crackers"	Fleming, Morgan	2:34
8.	"One of a Kind Pair of Fools"	R.C. Bannon, John Bettis	2:44
9.	"In Times Like These"	Fleming, Morgan	2:57
10.	"There's No Love in Tennessee"	Stephen Allen Davis, Morgan	3:26

== Sales chart positions ==
Album

Chart (1985)	Peak position
U.S. Top Country Albums	27
U.S. Billboard 200	210

Singles

Year	Song	Chart positions	
Year	Song	US Country	CAN Country
1985	"There's No Love in Tennessee"	7	24
