= Christmas Memories =

Studio album by Barbra Streisand
- Released: October 30, 2001
- Recorded: July 19 – September 7, 2001
- Studios: Chartmaker Studios (Malibu, California); Encore Studios (Burbank, California); Grandma's House (Malibu); O'Henry Sound Studios (Burbank); Sony Pictures Studios (Culver City, California); The Hop North (North Vancouver); Todd-AO (Studio City, California)
- Genre: Christmas
- Length: 47:13
- Label: Columbia
- Producers: Barbra Streisand; Jay Landers; William Ross; David Foster

Barbra Streisand chronology
Timeless: Live in Concert (2000)	Christmas Memories (2001)	The Essential Barbra Streisand (2002)

Singles from Christmas Memories
- 1. "It Must Have Been The Mistletoe" Released: 2001

Christmas Memories is the second Christmas album and twenty-ninth studio release by American singer Barbra Streisand. It was released on October 30, 2001, by Columbia. Streisand recorded the album during July, August, and September 2001 in various recording studios throughout California and in North Vancouver. It was executive-produced by Streisand and Jay Landers, while William Ross and David Foster served as additional producers. The album contains several cover versions of various holiday songs. To promote Christmas Memories, Columbia Records released an advance sampler version of the album titled A Voice for All Seasons.

The record's mood was described as melancholic, which music critics found fitting due to the album's release occurring soon after the September 11 attacks. Other reviewers called the album "beautifully rendered" and "excellent". Christmas Memories received a Grammy nomination for Best Traditional Pop Vocal Album in 2003. Commercially, it entered the charts in Canada and the United Kingdom. It also charted in the United States, where it peaked at number 15 on the Billboard 200 and was certified platinum by the Recording Industry Association of America for shipments of 1,000,000 copies. Streisand's cover of "It Must Have Been the Mistletoe" charted on the Adult Contemporary chart in the United States, peaking at number 28.

== Background ==
Christmas Memories was Streisand's second holiday album, following her 1967 Christmas release. Streisand began taking part in recording sessions for the album on July 19, 2001; on this day, she recorded both "I'll Be Home for Christmas" and "I Remember". Sessions took place throughout California and in North Vancouver. Streisand and Jay Landers are credited as the executive producers of Christmas Memories, with musicians David Foster and William Ross also receiving additional production credits. Streisand dedicated the album to the late artist Stephan Weiss, husband of fashion designer Donna Karan, who was close friends with Streisand before his death in June 2001.

Columbia Records released Christmas Memories on October 30, 2001, promoting the album with advertisements in several American magazines, including in InStyle, People, Talk, and Vanity Fair. A sampler album/extended play promotional release featured five selected tracks: "Grown-Up Christmas List", "It Must Have Been the Mistletoe", "I'll Be Home for Christmas", "Closer", and "One God".

== Music and songs ==
The album opens with a cover of "I'll Be Home for Christmas", a war song written by Kim Gannon, Walter Kent, and Buck Ram; William Ruhlmann from AllMusic considered the inclusion of this track on Christmas Memories to reflect Streisand's "mature perspective that very much takes loss into consideration". "A Christmas Love Song" is the second track and was written by Alan and Marilyn Bergman and Johnny Mandel. Author Tom Santopietro described the song's message as "an embrace of the holidays filled with honest sentiment". A "jazzy" rendition of Frank Loesser's "What Are You Doing New Year's Eve?" is the third song, followed by a reworked cover of "I Remember" by Stephen Sondheim. Streisand's cover of the latter song was described as "[still] an extremely sad song" by Ruhlmann. "Snowbound" was written by Russell Faith and Clarence Kehner, is set in a "moderately slow" tempo, and features the use of a piano. "It Must Have Been the Mistletoe" was considered by the staff at Show Music to be one of the many songs on the album to "focus on love".

"Christmas Lullaby" was written by Ann Hampton Callaway, who had previously collaborated with Streisand on Higher Ground (1997) and A Love Like Ours (1999). The Bergmans reworked Don Costa's "Christmas Mem'ries", which is included as the album's eighth track. Costa is credited as the song's original arranger, whereas Eddie Karam is credited for the extra arranging. "Grown-Up Christmas List" was written and produced by Foster and co-written by Linda Thompson. It contains a live orchestra that was arranged and conducted by Ross. Santopietro considered Franz Schubert's "Ave Maria" to be a nice "companion" to Charles Gounod's "Ave Maria", which she first included on A Christmas Album in 1967. "Closer" is dedicated to the singer's friend Stephan Weiss, who died before the album's recording sessions began. In the liner notes, Streisand wrote, "I'm singing 'Closer' about Stephan, but I was hoping it could relate to anyone who's lost someone". The album closes with "One God", which was written by Ervin Drake and Jimmy Shirl; Drake learned that Streisand had recorded the track after they had previously collaborated on Higher Ground, when she covered a track of his called "I Believe". On the Target and iTunes editions of the album, bonus track cover of "God Bless America" is included and produced by Streisand and Landers.

== Critical reception ==
Professional ratings
Review scores
Source	Rating
AllMusic	4/5 stars
Slant Magazine	3.5/5 stars

Billboard's Melinda Newman described the record as "a fine collection" and "beautifully rendered"; she also found Streisand's heavy amount of detail able to "elevate [...] the quality of this project far above the usual Christmas fare". Tom Santopietro, author of The Importance of Being Barbra, considered it to be Streisand's "most consistently successful CD" since The Broadway Album (1985). He called her "song choices [...] uniformly excellent" and stated that "I'll Be Home for Christmas", "What Are You Doing New Year's Eve?", and "One God" were the album's three best tracks. William Ruhlmann, of AllMusic, opined that the album "may come to seem like a remarkably dour holiday collection" due to its release taking place after the September 11 attacks, but overall found that its mood "could hardly be improved upon" given the situation. He felt that this exemplified the ability of "great artists", such as Streisand, to create and release music that "take[s] the temperature of the times with their work". Alexa Camp from Slant Magazine claimed that Christmas Memories contains "timeless holiday ambience courtesy of a consummate pro"; however, she considered the songs between "Snowbound" and "Grown-Up Christmas List" to be boring.

=== Accolades ===
Streisand was nominated at the 45th Annual Grammy Awards under the Best Traditional Pop Vocal Album category for Christmas Memories. However, she lost to Tony Bennett and his album Playin' with My Friends: Bennett Sings the Blues (2001).

== Commercial performance ==
Christmas Memories debuted on the Billboard 200 at number 32 on November 17, 2001. During its best-selling week, it sold 136,000 copies and peaked at number 15. In total, it spent nine weeks within the Billboard 200. It also topped the Top Holidays Albums chart. The album was certified platinum by the Recording Industry Association of America (RIAA) on December 3, 2001, for shipments of 1,000,000 copies. As of June 2007, the album has sold 1,100,000 copies. In Canada, it peaked at number 49 on the Canadian Albums Chart compiled by Nielsen. It also entered the UK Albums chart where it spent one week at number 137.

"It Must Have Been the Mistletoe" was distributed to United States radio stations during the Christmas season, allowing it to debut and peak at number 28 on the Adult Contemporary chart for the week ending January 5, 2002.

== Track listing ==
Songwriting credits adapted from AllMusic.

Christmas Memories – Standard edition
No.	Title	Writer(s)	Producer(s)	Length
1.	"I'll Be Home for Christmas"	Kim Gannon; Walter Kent; Buck Ram	Barbra Streisand; William Ross	4:12
2.	"A Christmas Love Song"	Alan Bergman; Marilyn Bergman; Johnny Mandel	Streisand	3:57
3.	"What Are You Doing New Year's Eve?"	Frank Loesser	Streisand; Ross	3:54
4.	"I Remember"	Stephen Sondheim	Streisand; Ross	4:57
5.	"Snowbound"	Russell Faith; Clarence Kehner	Streisand; Ross	2:59
6.	"It Must Have Been the Mistletoe"	Douglas Konecky; Justin Wilde	Streisand; Ross	3:10
7.	"Christmas Lullaby"	Ann Hampton Callaway	Streisand	3:30
8.	"Christmas Mem'ries"	A. Bergman; M. Bergman; Don Costa	Streisand	4:45
9.	"Grown-Up Christmas List"	David Foster; Linda Thompson	Foster	3:29
10.	"Ave Maria"	Franz Schubert	Streisand; Ross	4:42
11.	"Closer"	Dean Pitchford; Tom Snow	Streisand; Ross	3:58
12.	"One God"	Ervin Drake; Jimmy Shirl	Streisand; Ross	3:39
Total length:				47:13

Christmas Memories – Target bonus disc and iTunes deluxe edition
No.	Title	Writer(s)	Producer(s)	Length
13.	"God Bless America" (Live)	Irving Berlin	Streisand; Jay Landers	2:47
Total length:				50:00

A Voice for All Seasons EP – Promotional sampler edition
No.	Title	Length
1.	"Grown-Up Christmas List"	3:29
2.	"It Must Have Been the Mistletoe"	3:10
3.	"I'll Be Home for Christmas"	4:12
4.	"Closer"	3:58
5.	"One God"	3:39
Total length:		18:28

== Personnel ==
Credits adapted from the liner notes of the deluxe edition of Christmas Memories.

- Barbra Streisand – producer (tracks 1–8, 10–13), vocals, executive producer
- Renata Buser – assistant
- Jorge Calandrelli – arranger (tracks 2, 7, 8), conductor (tracks 2, 7, 8)
- Sue Ann Carwell – background vocals (track 6)
- Don Costa – original arranger (track 5)
- Felipe Elgueta – mixer (track 9), engineer (tracks 1, 9)
- Martin Erlichman – label representative
- Bob Esty – choir conductor (tracks 10, 12), vocal arranger (track 10)
- David Foster – producer (track 9), harmonica (track 1), rhythm arranger (track 9)
- Humberto Gatica – engineer (tracks 1, 3, 4)
- Chad M. Goodson – CD design
- Eddie Karam – arranger (tracks 5, 12)
- Nathaniel Kunkel – engineer (track 6)
- Peter Doell – engineer, assistant engineer
- Jay Landers – producer (track 13), executive producer
- Ian Logan – photography
- Gabrielle Raumberger – art direction
- David Reitzas – mixer (tracks 1–5, 7, 8, 10–12), engineer
- William Ross – producer (tracks 1, 3–6, 10–12), arranger (tracks 1, 3–4, 6, 10, 11), conductor (tracks 1, 3–6, 10–11)
- Al Schmitt – engineer (tracks 2, 7, 8)
- Bill Schnee – mixer (track 6)
- Kim Skalecki – assistant
- Allan Stein – album project coordinator
- Wendi Wagner – background vocals (track 6)
- Firooz Zahedi – photography
- Michael Mishaw – background vocals (tracks 10, 12)

== Charts ==
=== Weekly charts ===
Chart (2001–2002)	Peak position
Australian Albums (ARIA)	146
Canadian Albums Chart (Nielsen)	49
UK Albums (OCC)	137
US Billboard 200	15
US Top Holiday Albums (Billboard)	1

=== Year-end charts ===
Chart (2002)	Position
US Billboard 200	108

== Certifications ==
Region	Certification	Certified units/sales
United States (RIAA)	Platinum	1,100,000

== See also ==
- List of Billboard Top Holiday Albums number ones of the 2000s
