= Ed Bruce (1980 album) =

Studio album by Ed Bruce
- Released: 1980
- Genre: Country
- Length: 38:03
- Label: MCA
- Producer: Tommy West

Ed Bruce chronology
Taste of Honey (1979)	Ed Bruce (1980)	King of the Road (1980)

Ed Bruce is the seventh studio album by the American country music artist Ed Bruce. It was released in 1980 via MCA Records and includes the singles "Diane", "The Last Cowboy Song" and "Girls, Women and Ladies".

== Track listing ==
No.	Title	Writer(s)	Length
1.	"Diane"	Ronnie Rogers	4:29
2.	"The Last Thing She Said"	Ed Bruce, Ron Peterson	4:03
3.	"The Last Cowboy Song" (duet with Willie Nelson)	E. Bruce, Peterson	4:47
4.	"Red Doggin' Again"	E. Bruce, Rogers	4:03
5.	"Love Ain't Something I Can Do Alone"	E. Bruce, Patsy Bruce	3:33
6.	"Girls, Women and Ladies"	E. Bruce, P. Bruce, Peterson	3:25
7.	"Neon Fool"	Rogers	3:14
8.	"Blue Umbrella"	John Prine	4:15
9.	"I Still Wish the Very Best for You"	Brent Titcomb	3:09
10.	"The Outlaw and the Stranger"	E. Bruce, Peterson	3:04

== Chart performance ==
Chart (1980)	Peak position
US Top Country Albums (Billboard)	22
