= You're Not Leavin' Here Tonight =

Studio album by Ed Bruce
- Released: 1983
- Genre: Country
- Length: 34:08
- Label: MCA
- Producer: Tommy West

Ed Bruce chronology
I Write It Down (1982)	You're Not Leavin' Here Tonight (1983)	Tell 'Em I've Gone Crazy (1984)

You're Not Leavin' Here Tonight is the twelfth studio album by American country music artist Ed Bruce. It was released in 1983 via MCA Records. The album includes the singles "You're Not Leavin' Here Tonight", "If It Was Easy" and "After All".

== Track listing ==
No.	Title	Writer(s)	Length
1.	"You're Not Leavin' Here Tonight"	Kerry Chater, Tommy Rocco, Charlie Black	3:29
2.	"It Would Take a Fool"	Wayland Holyfield	3:51
3.	"In Mexico"	Sanger D. Shafer	3:28
4.	"If It Was Easy"	Larry Kingston, Harlan Sanders	3:24
5.	"It's the Lovers (Who Give Love a Bad Name)"	J. Martin Johnson	3:20
6.	"After All"	Ed Bruce, Patsy Bruce	3:34
7.	"Lucky Arms"	Shafer, Lefty Frizzell	2:42
8.	"You've Got Her Eyes"	Dickey Lee, Mark Sameth	3:32
9.	"I Think I'm in Love"	Keith Stegall, Charley Craig	3:19
10.	"I'll Be There to Catch You"	Mitch Johnson, Robet John Jones	3:29

== Chart performance ==
Chart (1983)	Peak position
US Top Country Albums (Billboard)	35
