= One to One (Ed Bruce album) =

Studio album by Ed Bruce
- Released: 1981
- Genre: Country
- Length: 35:12
- Label: MCA
- Producer: Tommy West

Ed Bruce chronology
King of the Road (1980)	One to One (1981)	Last Train to Clarksville (1982)

One to One is the ninth studio album by American country music artist Ed Bruce. It was released in 1981 via MCA Records. The album includes the singles "Evil Angel", "(When You Fall in Love) Everything's a Waltz", "You're the Best Break This Old Heart Ever Had" and "Love's Found You and Me".

== Track listing ==
No.	Title	Writer(s)	Length
1.	"(When You Fall in Love) Everything's a Waltz"	Ed Bruce, Patsy Bruce, Ron Peterson	3:30
2.	"Evil Angel"	Jesse Winchester	3:55
3.	"You're the Best Break This Old Heart Ever Had"	Wayland Holyfield, Randy Hatch	3:27
4.	"It Just Makes Me Want You More"	Winchester	4:05
5.	"Hundred Dollar Lady"	Charley Craig	3:11
6.	"Love's Found You and Me"	E. Bruce, Ronnie Rogers	3:13
7.	"I Take the Chance"	Charlie Louvin, Ira Louvin	3:10
8.	"No Regrets"	Tom Rush	4:31
9.	"Thirty-Nine and Holding"	E. Bruce, Peterson	3:23
10.	"Easy Temptations"	Jim Garrigus	3:47

== Chart performance ==
Chart (1981)	Peak position
US Top Country Albums (Billboard)	29
