= Driving wheel (disambiguation) =

A driving wheel is a powered wheel on a steam locomotive.

Driving wheel or Driving Wheel may also refer to:

- Steering wheel or driving wheel, a control for directing a road vehicle
- "Driving Wheel", a 1936 blues song by Roosevelt Sykes
- "Driving Wheel" (David Wiffen song), a 1971 folk song

== See also ==
- Drive wheel, a powered wheel on a road vehicle
- "Driving Wheels", a 1988 song by Jimmy Barnes
- "Drivin' Wheel", a 1983 single by Emmylou Harris
- "Drivin' Wheel", a 1976 song by Foghat
