= I Write It Down =

Studio album by Ed Bruce
- Released: 1982
- Genre: Country
- Length: 36:10
- Label: MCA
- Producer: Tommy West

Ed Bruce chronology
| Last Train to Clarksville (1982) | I Write It Down (1982) | You're Not Leavin' Here Tonight (1983) |

I Write It Down is the eleventh studio album by American country music artist Ed Bruce. It was released in 1982 via MCA Records. The album includes the singles "Ever, Never Lovin' You" and "My First Taste of Texas".

== Track listing ==
| No. | Title | Writer(s) | Length |
|---|---|---|---|
| 1. | "My First Taste of Texas" | Ed Bruce, Ronnie Rogers | 3:56 |
| 2. | "Ever, Never Lovin' You" | E. Bruce, Patsy Bruce, Glenn Ray | 3:00 |
| 3. | "Somebody's Crying" | E. Bruce, Ron Peterson | 4:13 |
| 4. | "One More Shot of "Old Back Home Again"" | E. Bruce, P. Bruce | 3:21 |
| 5. | "The Songwriter (I Write It Down)" | E. Bruce, P. Bruce, Peterson | 3:28 |
| 6. | "Theme from "Bret Maverick"" (featuring James Garner) | E. Bruce, P. Bruce, Ray | 2:42 |
| 7. | "Memories Can't Stand to Be Alone" | E. Bruce, Peterson | 3:50 |
| 8. | "Your Jukebox Could Use a Few More Sad Songs" | E. Bruce, Peterson | 3:32 |
| 9. | "Babe in Arms" | E. Bruce, Peterson | 3:58 |
| 10. | "Mammas Don't Let Your Babies Grow Up to Be Cowboys" | E. Bruce, P. Bruce | 4:10 |

== Chart performance ==
| Chart (1982) | Peak position |
|---|---|
| US Top Country Albums (Billboard) | 63 |
