= Night Things (Ed Bruce album) =

Studio album by Ed Bruce
- Released: 1986
- Genre: Country
- Length: 30:33
- Label: RCA
- Producer: Blake Mevis, Ed Bruce

Ed Bruce chronology
Greatest Hits (1985)	Night Things (1986)	Rock Boppin' Baby (1986)

Night Things is the fifteenth studio album by American country music artist Ed Bruce. It was released in 1986 via RCA Records. The album includes the singles "Nights", "Fool for Each Other" and "Quietly Crazy".

== Track listing ==
No.	Title	Writer(s)	Length
1.	"Nights"	Byron Hill, Tony Hiller	2:59
2.	"You Are a Rose"	Joe Allen, Mike Elliott	2:50
3.	"Fools for Each Other" (duet with Lynn Anderson)	Guy Clark	4:09
4.	"Quietly Crazy"	Steve Cropper, Mentor Williams	3:04
5.	"Fifteen to Forty-Three (Man in the Mirror)"	Don Goodman, Mark Sherrill, John Wesley Ryles, Frank Dycus	3:28
6.	"Fishin' in the Dark"	Wendy Waldman, Jim Photoglo	3:45
7.	"Somebody's Somebody New"	Gene Dobbins, Johnny MacRae, Glenn Ray	3:18
8.	"Down the Hall" (duet with Lynn Anderson)	Mike Reid, Troy Seals	2:50
9.	"Memphis Roots"	Ed Bruce	4:10

== Chart performance ==
Chart (1986)	Peak position
US Top Country Albums (Billboard)	53
