= (When You Fall in Love) Everything's a Waltz =

Single by Ed Bruce

from the album One to One
- B-side: "Thirty-Nine and Holding"
- Released: July 25, 1981
- Genre: Country
- Length: 3:32
- Label: MCA
- Songwriters: Ed Bruce, Patsy Bruce, Ron Peterson
- Producer: Tommy West

Ed Bruce singles chronology
"Evil Angel" (1981)	"(When You Fall in Love) Everything's a Waltz" (1981)	"You're the Best Break This Old Heart Ever Had" (1981)

"(When You Fall in Love) Everything's a Waltz" is a song co-written and recorded by American country music artist Ed Bruce. It was released in July 1981 as the second single from the album One to One. The song reached number 14 on the Billboard Hot Country Singles & Tracks chart. Bruce wrote the song with his wife Patsy and Ron Peterson.

== Chart performance ==
Chart (1981)	Peak position
US Hot Country Songs (Billboard)	14
Canadian RPM Country Singles & Tracks	12
