= You Turn Me On (Like a Radio) =

Single by Ed Bruce

from the album Homecoming
- B-side: "If It Ain't Love"
- Released: October 1984
- Genre: Country
- Length: 3:29
- Label: RCA 13937
- Songwriter(s): Bob McDill, Jim Weatherly
- Producer(s): Blake Mevis

Ed Bruce singles chronology
"Tell 'em I've Gone Crazy" (1984)	"You Turn Me On (Like a Radio)" (1984)	"If It Ain't Love" (1985)

"You Turn Me On (Like a Radio)" is a song written by Bob McDill and Jim Weatherly, and recorded by American country music artist Ed Bruce. It was released in October 1984 as the first single from his album Homecoming. The song reached number 3 on the Billboard Hot Country Singles chart.

== Chart performance ==
Chart (1984–1985)	Peak position
US Hot Country Songs (Billboard)	3
Canadian RPM Country Tracks	3
