= Evangeline (Emmylou Harris album) =

Studio album by Emmylou Harris
- Released: February 4, 1981
- Recorded: 1978–1980
- Studios: Enactron; Nashville
- Genre: Country
- Length: 33:32
- Label: Warner Bros. Nashville
- Producer: Brian Ahern

Emmylou Harris chronology
Roses in the Snow (1980)	Evangeline (1981)	Cimarron (1981)

Singles from Evangeline
- 1. "Mr. Sandman" Released: February 11, 1981; 2. "I Don't Have to Crawl" Released: May 1981

Professional ratings
Review scores
Source	Rating
AllMusic	2.5/5 stars

Evangeline is the eighth studio album by Emmylou Harris. It was composed mostly of leftover material from past recording sessions and which did not fit into any of her other albums. Songs included a remake of "Mister Sandman" (from the much-lauded Trio sessions with Dolly Parton and Linda Ronstadt), "Evangeline" (also featuring vocals by Parton and Ronstadt), which she had previously performed with the Band, Rodney Crowell's "Ashes by Now", and a cover of John Fogerty's "Bad Moon Rising". Though it received mixed reviews upon its release, the album was yet another commercial success for Harris. It was certified Gold in less than a year after its release. A single release of "Mister Sandman" (Top 10 country/Top 40 pop) did well on the charts, though neither Ronstadt's nor Parton's record companies would allow their artists' vocals to be used on the single, so Harris rerecorded the song, singing all three parts for the single release. Rodney Crowell's "I Don't Have to Crawl" was released as the album's second single. (Music videos were produced for both "Mister Sandman" and "I Don't Have to Crawl".)

This is one of two Harris albums that have never been issued separately on CD (although, in 2011, the album's tracks became available for digital download on iTunes). The album is now available as a CD in a collection issued in 2013 entitled Emmylou Harris Original Album Series Vol. 2.

== Track listing ==
No.	Title	Writer(s)	Length
1.	"I Don't Have to Crawl"	Rodney Crowell	3:46
2.	"How High the Moon"	Morgan Lewis, Nancy Hamilton	3:21
3.	"Spanish Johnny" (with Waylon Jennings)	Paul Siebel	3:50
4.	"Bad Moon Rising"	John Fogerty	2:40
5.	"Evangeline" (harmony by Dolly Parton and Linda Ronstadt)	Robbie Robertson	3:09
6.	"Hot Burrito #2"	Gram Parsons, Chris Ethridge	3:04
7.	"Millworker"	James Taylor	4:03
8.	"Oh Atlanta"	Bill Payne	2:58
9.	"Mr. Sandman" (harmony by Dolly Parton and Linda Ronstadt)	Pat Ballard	2:20
10.	"Ashes by Now"	Rodney Crowell	4:24

== Personnel ==
- Brian Ahern – acoustic guitar, electric guitar, arch-Top guitar, gut string guitar, 6-string bass, tambourine
- Hal Blaine – drums
- Mike Bowden – bass
- David Briggs – piano
- Tony Brown – piano
- James Burton – electric guitar
- Rodney Crowell – acoustic guitar, electric guitar
- Hank DeVito – pedal steel
- Jerry Douglas – dobro
- Steve Fishell – dobro
- Amos Garrett – electric guitar
- Emory Gordy Jr. – bass, Ernie Ball bass
- Glen Hardin – electric piano
- Emmylou Harris – vocals, acoustic guitar, backing vocals
- Waylon Jennings – duet vocals
- Don Johnson – piano, backing vocals
- Lynn Langham – synthesizer
- Albert Lee – electric guitar, piano
- Dave Lewis – drums
- Larrie Londin – drums
- Dolly Parton – harmony and backing vocals on “Evangeline” and “Mr. Sandman”
- Bill Payne – piano, electric piano
- Herb Pedersen – backing vocals
- Mickey Raphael – harmonica
- Mac Rebbenack – piano
- Frank Reckard – acoustic guitar, electric guitar
- Tony Rice – acoustic guitar, backing vocals
- Linda Ronstadt – harmony and backing vocals on “Evangeline” and “Mr. Sandman”
- Craig Safan – string arrangements
- Ricky Skaggs – acoustic guitar, fiddle, mandolin, backing vocals
- Barry Tashian – backing vocals
- John Ware – drums, percussion
- Cheryl White – backing vocals
- Sharon White – backing vocals

Technical

- Brian Ahern – producer, engineer
- Donivan Cowart – engineer
- Bradley Hartman – engineer
- Stuart Taylor – engineer

== Charts ==
=== Weekly charts ===
Chart (1981)	Peak position
US Billboard 200	22
US Top Country Albums (Billboard)	5

=== Year-end charts ===
Chart (1981)	Position
US Billboard 200	96
US Top Country Albums (Billboard)	25

== Release history ==
Release history and formats for Evangeline
Region	Date	Format	Label	Ref.
North America	January 1981	LP; cassette	Warner Bros. Records	
