= I Don't Have to Crawl =

Single by Emmylou Harris

from the album Evangeline
- B-side: "Colors of Your Heart"
- Released: May 1981
- Recorded: June 1978
- Studio: Enactron Studios
- Genre: Country rock
- Length: 3:47
- Label: Warner Bros.
- Songwriter(s): Rodney Crowell
- Producer(s): Brian Ahern

Emmylou Harris singles chronology
"Mister Sandman" (1981)	"I Don't Have to Crawl" (1981)	"If I Needed You" (1981)

"I Don't Have to Crawl" is a song written by Rodney Crowell that was originally recorded by American singer and songwriter Emmylou Harris. It was the second single spawned from her 1981 album Evangeline. It reached charting positions on the North American charts, including the Canadian country top 40.

== Background and recording ==
Carrying on the country rock musical legacy of mentor Gram Parsons, Emmylou Harris found mainstream commercial success beginning in the 1970s. After the 1975 studio album Pieces of the Sky, Harris recorded and released a series of discs that received critical acclaim and success. She had several chart-topping country singles including "Together Again" (1976) and "Beneath Still Waters" (1980). Harris took a brief touring hiatus after welcoming a second child. Her 1981 album Evangeline took recordings that were "left off" previous discs. "I Don't Have to Crawl" was one of two singles spawned from Evangeline. It was composed by musical collaborator Rodney Crowell and was recorded in June 1978 at Encatron Studios, located in Nashville, Tennessee. The song was produced by Brian Ahern.

== Release, chart performance and promotion ==
"I Don't Have to Crawl" first appeared on Evangeline, which was originally released in January 1981. In May 1981, the track was released as a seven-inch vinyl single by Warner Bros. Records. It was backed on the B-side by another Crowell-penned song called "Colors of Your Heart". "I Don't Have to Crawl" debuted on the American Billboard Hot Country Songs chart in June 1981. Spending eight weeks there, it reached the number 44 position in July 1981. It was Harris' first single since 1973's "Too Far Gone" to peak outside the country top 40 up to that point. It also reached the top 40 of the Canadian RPM Country Tracks chart, peaking at number 34 in 1981.

Along with the preceding single ("Mister Sandman"), "I Don't Have to Crawl" received a promotional music video. It was directed by Ethan Allen Productions in Los Angeles, California.

== Track listing ==
7" vinyl single

- "I Don't Have to Crawl" – 3:47
- "Colors of Your Heart" – 4:17

== Chart performance ==
Chart (1981)	Peak position
Canada Country Singles (RPM)	34
US Bubbling Under Hot 100 (Billboard)	6
US Hot Country Songs (Billboard)	44

== Cover Versions ==
- 2025 - John Greene, Sunburn for the Soul
