= Someone like You (Emmylou Harris song) =

"Someone Like You"

Single by Emmylou Harris

from the album Profile II: The Best of Emmylou Harris
- B-side: "Light of the Stable"
- Released: October 1984
- Recorded: November 1978
- Studio: Enactron Truck Studios
- Genre: Country
- Length: 3:14
- Label: Warner Bros.
- Songwriter(s): Dickey Lee; Bob McDill
- Producer(s): Brian Ahern

Emmylou Harris singles chronology
"Pledging My Love" (1984)	"Someone Like You" (1984)	"White Line" (1985)

"Drivin' Wheel" is a song written by Dickey Lee and Bob McDill, and recorded by American singer Emmylou Harris. It was released in October 1984 as the lead single from Harris' compilation album Profile II: The Best of Emmylou Harris. It reached positions on the US and Canadian country charts following its release.

== Background and recording ==
With a country rock formula built off the work of Gram Parsons, Emmylou Harris forged her how musical career in the 1970s and 1980s. Not only critically acclaimed, her recordings were also commercially successful. Harris had a string of top ten and chart topping country singles during this period including "Together Again" (1976), "Beneath Still Waters" (1980) and "Lost His Love (On Our Last Date)" (1982). A compilation album issued by Warner Bros. Records was released in 1984 titled Profile II: The Best of Emmylou Harris. One song never before released was "Someone Like You". Written by Dickey Lee and Bob McDill, the song was actually recorded six years prior in November 1978. The session was produced by Brian Ahern at Enactron Truck Studios in Los Angeles, California.

== Release, chart performance and reception ==
"Someone Like You" served as the lead single and only single off Profile II: The Best of Emmylou Harris. It was issued by Warner Bros. Records in October 1984. It was backed on the B-side by the song "Light of the Stable". The single was distributed as a seven-inch vinyl single. "Drivin' Wheel" debuted on the US Billboard Hot Country Songs chart in November 1984. It spent 18 weeks there, reaching the number 26 position in January 1984. The song reached the top 20 of the Canadian RPM Country Tracks chart, reaching the number 14 position around the same period. "Someone Like You" was reviewed by Billboard magazine and was named one of their "country picks". "the sweetest voice in the Western world discourses on the inevitability of true lovers finding each other," the publication wrote.

== Track listing ==
7" vinyl single

- "Someone Like You" – 3:14
- "Light of the Stable" – 2:25

== Chart performance ==
Chart (1984–1985)	Peak position
Canada Country Singles (RPM)	14
US Hot Country Songs (Billboard)	26
