= Love's Found You and Me =

Single by Ed Bruce

from the album One to One
- B-side: "I Take the Chance"
- Released: April 28, 1982
- Genre: Country, country rock, urban cowboy
- Length: 3:16
- Label: MCA
- Songwriter(s): Ed Bruce; Ronnie Rogers
- Producer(s): Tommy West

Ed Bruce singles chronology
"You're the Best Break This Old Heart Ever Had" (1981)	"Love's Found You and Me" (1982)	"Ever, Never Lovin' You" (1982)

"Love's Found You and Me" is a song recorded by American country music artist Ed Bruce. It was released in April 1982 as the fourth single from the album One to One. The song reached number 13 on the US Billboard Hot Country Singles & Tracks chart. Bruce wrote the song with Ronnie Rogers.

== Chart performance ==
Chart (1982)	Peak position
US Hot Country Songs (Billboard)	13
Canadian RPM Country Tracks	14
