= It Should Have Been Love by Now =

Single by Lee Greenwood and Barbara Mandrell

from the album Meant for Each Other
- B-side: "Can't Get Too Much of a Good Thing"
- Released: February 2, 1985
- Genre: Country
- Length: 3:15
- Label: MCA
- Songwriter(s): Jan Crutchfield, Paul Harrison
- Producer(s): Tom Collins

Lee Greenwood singles chronology
"You've Got a Good Love Comin'" (1985)	"It Should Have Been Love by Now" (1985)	"Dixie Road" (1985)

Barbara Mandrell singles chronology
"Crossword Puzzle" (1984)	"It Should Have Been Love by Now" (1985)	"There's No Love in Tennessee" (1985)

"It Should Have Been Love by Now" is a song written by Jan Crutchfield and Paul Harrison, and recorded by American country music artists Lee Greenwood and Barbara Mandrell. It was released in February 1985 as the second single from the album Meant for Each Other. The song reached #19 on the Billboard Hot Country Singles & Tracks chart.

== Chart performance ==
Chart (1985)	Peak position
US Hot Country Songs (Billboard)	19
US Adult Contemporary (Billboard)	35
Canadian RPM Country Tracks	12
