= Ever, Never Lovin' You =

Single by Ed Bruce

from the album I Write It Down
- B-side: "Theme from Bret Maverick"
- Released: July 1982
- Genre: Country
- Length: 2:56
- Label: MCA 52109
- Songwriter(s): Ed Bruce, Patsy Bruce, Glenn Ray
- Producer(s): Tommy West

Ed Bruce singles chronology
"Love's Found You and Me" (1982)	"Ever, Never Lovin' You" (1982)	"My First Taste of Texas" (1983)

"Ever, Never Lovin' You" is a song co-written and recorded by American country music artist Ed Bruce. It was released in July 1982 as the first single from his album I Write It Down. The song reached number 4 on the Billboard Hot Country Singles chart. Bruce wrote the song with his wife Patsy and Glenn Ray.

== Chart performance ==
Chart (1982)	Peak position
US Hot Country Songs (Billboard)	4
Canadian RPM Country Tracks	4
