= Guy Clarke =

Guy Clark (1941–2016) was an American musician.

Guy Clark or Clarke may also refer to:

- Guy Clark (album)
- Guy Clarke (ambassador), ambassador of the United Kingdom to Nepal
- Guy Clarke (entrepreneur), Founder of Sizzle Dining

== See also ==
- Sir Guy Clarke-Travers, 3rd Baronet (1842–1905) of the Clarke-Travers baronets
- Clarke (surname)
