= Girls, Women and Ladies =

Single by Ed Bruce

from the album Ed Bruce
- B-side: "The Last Thing She Said"
- Released: November 8, 1980
- Genre: Country
- Length: 3:22
- Label: MCA
- Songwriters: Ed Bruce, Patsy Bruce, Ron Peterson
- Producer: Tommy West

Ed Bruce singles chronology
"The Last Cowboy Song" (1980)	"Girls, Women and Ladies" (1980)	"Evil Angel" (1981)

Professional ratings
Review scores
Source	Rating
Billboard	(unrated)

"Girl, Women and Ladies" is a song co-written and recorded by American country music artist Ed Bruce. It was released in November 1980 as the third single from the album Ed Bruce. The song reached No. 14 on the Billboard Hot Country Singles & Tracks chart. Bruce wrote the song with his wife Patsy and Ron Peterson.

== Chart performance ==
Chart (1980–1981)	Peak position
US Hot Country Songs (Billboard)	14
