= Spun Gold =

1983 album by Barbara Mandrell

Studio album by Barbara Mandrell
- Released: July 29, 1983
- Recorded: February 1983 (Nashville, TN)
- Genre: Country pop
- Length: 31:35
- Label: MCA
- Producer: Tom Collins

Barbara Mandrell chronology
He Set My Life to Music (1982)	Spun Gold (1983)	Clean Cut (1984)

Singles from Spun Gold
- 1. "In Times Like These" Released: April 2, 1983; 2. "One of a Kind Pair of Fools" Released: August 8, 1983

Professional ratings
Review scores
Source	Rating
AllMusic	2/5 stars

Spun Gold is the thirteenth solo studio album by American country music artist Barbara Mandrell. The album was released in July 1983 on MCA Records and was produced by Tom Collins. Spun Gold produced two major hit singles on the Billboard Country Singles chart in 1983.

== Background and content ==
Spun Gold was recorded in February 1983 in Nashville, Tennessee and contained ten tracks of new recordings. The album mainly consisted of country pop-influenced material mixed with song themes that discuss the hardships of working-class people. It included a duet with country artist Steve Wariner entitled "Overnight Sensation". Allmusic reviewer Greg Adams compared background guitar on the track "In Times Like These" to the guitar "riff" on Ike & Tina Turner's single, "Proud Mary". He also considered the single, "One of a Kind Pair of Fools" to have a "strong hook and pure pop production". Overall, Adams only gave the release two out five stars, calling the material "disco-era glitz". Adams also found the album's cover to be displeasing saying, "Meanwhile, Mandrell is decked out on the album cover like a high-fashion model in gold lame'. Dolly Parton has always been able to negotiate these kinds of apparent contradictions, but Mandrell does not have the same gift."

Spun Gold was issued on an LP album in its original release, with five songs on each side of the record.

== Release ==
Spun Gold spawned two singles in 1983. The lead single from the album was the opening track "In Times Like These". The song was released to radio in March 1983 and reached a peak of number 4 on the Billboard Magazine Hot Country Songs chart and number 6 on the RPM Canadian Country chart. The second single "One of a Kind (A Pair of Fools)" was released in July 1983 and became Mandrell's final number 1 single on the Billboard Country Singles Chart and also reached the same position on the Canadian RPM Country Tracks chart. Spun Gold was also released in 1983 and peaked at number 5 on the Billboard Top Country Albums chart, her highest charting studio album on that chart and number 140 on the Billboard 200 albums chart.

== Track listing ==
Side one

1. "In Times Like These" (Kye Fleming, Dennis Morgan) – 2:58
2. "As Well As Can Be Expected" (Fleming, Morgan) – 3:23
3. "One of a Kind Pair of Fools" (R. C. Bannon, John Bettis) – 2:48
4. "Only Now and Then" (Don Pfrimmer, Mike Reid) – 3:22
5. "You Are No Angel" (Roberto Danova, Grant Blair) – 2:57

Side two

1. "A Man's Not a Man ('Til He's Loved by a Woman)" (Steve Dean, Frank J. Myers) – 3:15
2. "Overnight Sensation" (Jerry Fuller) – 3:16
  - with Steve Wariner
3. "Loveless" (Fleming, Morgan) – 3:07
4. "Bad Boys" (Diane Warren) – 2:54
5. "Cryin' All the Way to the Bank" (Fleming, Morgan) – 3:35

== Personnel ==
From Spun Gold album jacket.

Musicians

- Pete Bordonali – electric guitar, mandolin, sitar
- David Briggs – piano, Rhodes piano
- Larry Byrom – electric guitar
- Jimmy Capps – rhythm guitar
- Russ Powell - acoustic guitar
- Tom Collins – organ
- Sonny Garrish – steel guitar
- David Hungate – bass guitar
- Michael Jones – steel guitar
- Shane Keister – synthesizer
- Mike Leech – bass guitar
- Randy McCormick – organ
- Dennis Morgan – rhythm guitar
- Nashville String Machine – strings
- Bobby Ogdin – piano, Rhodes piano, synthesizer
- Larry Paxton – bass guitar
- James Stroud – drums
- Reggie Young – electric guitar

Background vocals

- Steve Brantley
- Robert Byrne
- The Cherry Sisters (Sherry Huffman, Lisa Silver, and Diane Tidwell)
- Pat Childs
- Bruce Dees
- Jim Ferguson
- Greg Gordin
- Larry Keith
- Mary Ann Lomax

Technical

- Tom Collins – producer
- Tim Farmer – engineer
- Archie Jordan – string arrangement
- Les Ladd – engineer
- Barbara Mandrell – producer
- Denny Purcell – mastering
- D. Bergen White – string arrangement

== Charts ==
=== Weekly charts ===
Chart (1983)	Peak position
U.S. Top Country Albums	5
U.S. Billboard 200	140

=== Singles ===
Year	Song	Chart positions	
Year	Song	US Country	CAN Country
1983	"In Times Like These"	4	6
1983	"One of a Kind Pair of Fools"	1	1
