= Mr. Sandman =

1954 song

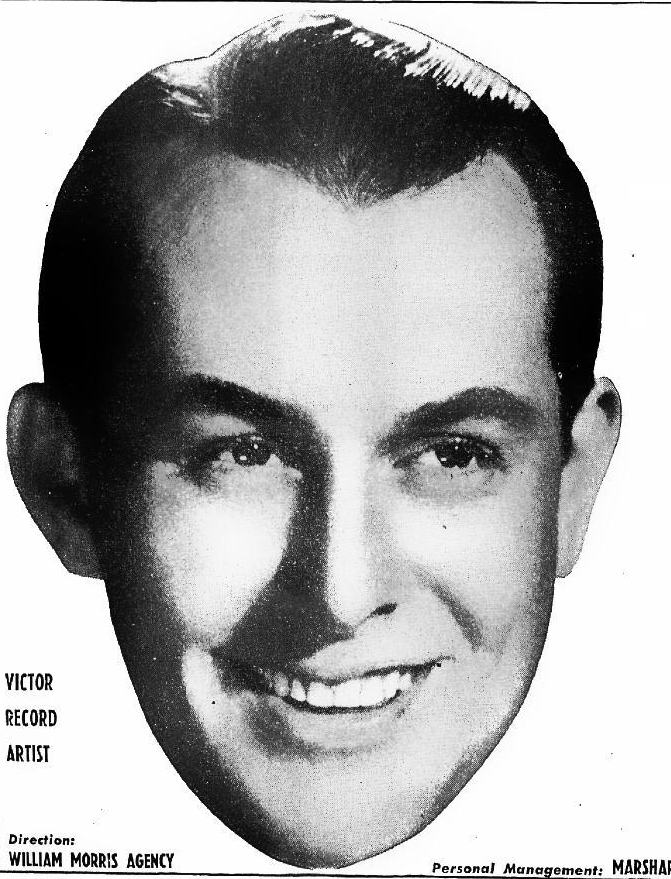
Monroe recorded the first version of the song with his orchestra in May 1954.

"Mr. Sandman" (or "Mister Sandman") is a popular song written by Pat Ballard and published in 1954. It was first recorded in May of that year by Vaughn Monroe and his orchestra and later that year by The Chordettes and the Four Aces. The song's lyrics convey a request to "Mr. Sandman" to "bring me a dream" – the traditional association of the folkloric figure (but in this context the meaning of dream is more akin to 'dreamboat'). The pronoun used to refer to the desired dream is often changed depending on the gender of the singer or group performing the song, as the original sheet music publication, which includes male and female versions of the lyrics, intended.

Emmylou Harris's recording of the song was a hit in multiple countries in 1981. Other versions of the song have been produced by Chet Atkins (1954) and Bert Kaempfert (1968).

== Background ==
Vaughn Monroe, with his orchestra, was the first to record the song in 1954. It was released as the B-side of "They Were Doin' the Mambo", on RCA Victor label as catalog number 20-5767 / 47-5767. This record lacked the complex vocal harmonies found in many later versions of the song.

In December 1954, the song reached No. 1 on the Cash Box Top 50, in a tandem ranking of the versions by the Chordettes, the Four Aces, Buddy Morrow, Vaughn Monroe, Les Elgart, the Lancers, and the Song Singers, with the Chordettes and the Four Aces' versions marked as bestsellers. It also reached No. 1 on Cash Box's chart of "The Nation's Top Ten Juke Box Tunes", in the same tandem ranking, and No. 1 on Cash Box's chart of "The Ten Records Disk Jockeys Played Most This Week", with only the Chordettes version listed initially, but later in a tandem ranking of the Chordettes and the Four Aces' versions.

The song also reached No. 1 on Billboard's "Honor Roll of Hits", with the Chordettes and the Four Aces' versions listed as best sellers, and was ranked No. 12 on Billboard's ranking of "1955's Top Tunes" based on the Honor Roll of Hits.

== The Chordettes version ==
"Mr. Sandman"

Single by The Chordettes
- B-side: "I Don't Wanna See You Cryin'"
- Released: October 1, 1954
- Recorded: 1954
- Genre: Barbershop music; traditional pop
- Length: 2:22
- Label: Cadence
- Songwriter: Pat Ballard
- Producer: Archie Bleyer

The Chordettes singles chronology
"Moonlight on the Ganges" (1951)	"Mr. Sandman" (1954)	"Lonely Lips" (1955)

The Chordettes' recording of the song was released on the Cadence Records label, on both 78 RPM and 45 RPM formats. Cadence's founder, Archie Bleyer, was the orchestra conductor on the recording, and provided a rhythmic beat for the recording using his knees. Bleyer's voice is heard briefly in the third verse, when he says "Yes?" The piano is played by Moe Wechsler. Liberace's name is mentioned for his "wavy hair", and a glissando (a flourish common in his music) immediately follows. Pagliacci is mentioned for having a lonely heart, which is a reference to the opera Pagliacci by Ruggero Leoncavallo. An important milestone in this version is the opening sequence of vocal arpeggios ("bom, bom, bom, bom" etc.). This section was heavily sampled by several subsequent genres, such as hip-hop.

In the United States, the Chordettes' single reached No. 1 on all three of Billboard's popular music charts, and was ranked No. 9 in Cash Box's ranking of "1955's Top Pop Records as Voted in the Cash Box Poll".

In 2002, the 1954 recording of the song by The Chordettes on Cadence Records was inducted into the Grammy Hall of Fame.

The Chordettes' version was notably featured in scenes of several TV shows and movies throughout the years, including Halloween II (1981), Uncle Buck (1989), Halloween H20: 20 Years Later (1998), Doctor Who (2005), Mr Nobody (2009), Grimm (2011), Sleepy Hollow (2013), Deadpool (2016), and Stranger Things (2016).

=== Chart performance ===
Chart (1954–1955)	Peak position
UK New Musical Express	11
US Billboard Best Sellers in Stores	1
US Billboard Most Played by Jockeys	1
US Billboard Most Played in Juke Boxes	1

== The Four Aces version ==
"Mister Sandman"
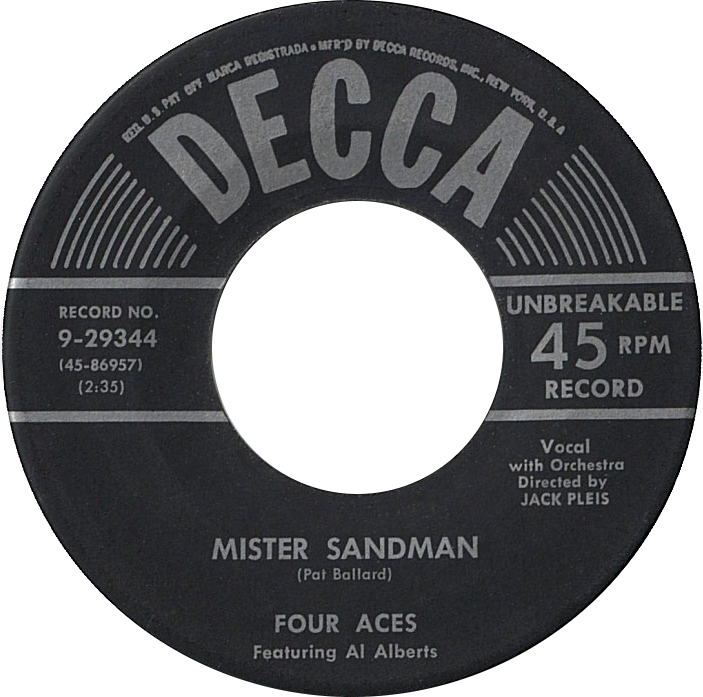
- U.S. vinyl single of the Four Aces recording

Single by the Four Aces featuring Al Alberts
- B-side: "(I'll Be with You) In Apple Blossom Time"
- Released: November 1954
- Genre: Traditional pop
- Length: 2:35
- Label: Decca
- Songwriter: Pat Ballard

In 1954, the Four Aces released a version of the song, backed by the Jack Pleis Orchestra. The Four Aces' version was a top-ten hit in the United States, United Kingdom, and Flanders.

In 1985 The Four Aces' version was notably featured in the sci-fi movie Back to the Future in a scene when Marty McFly first realizes he is in 1955, arriving at the town's square.

=== Chart performance ===
Chart (1954–1955)	Peak position
Belgium Flanders	2
UK New Musical Express	9
US Billboard Best Sellers in Stores	9
US Billboard Most Played by Jockeys	5
US Billboard Most Played in Juke Boxes	6

== Chet Atkins version ==
On November 17, 1954, Chet Atkins recorded an instrumental version during a four-song recording session at RCA Victor's Nashville recording studio. Atkins used the Ray Butts EchoSonic guitar amp on this recording, and was backed by celesta, piano, bass, and drums. Atkins' version was released as a single in January 1955. It was Atkins' first single to chart on Billboard's country charts, and reached No. 15 on Billboard's Country & Western Records chart of "Best Sellers in Stores" and No. 13 on Billboard's Country & Western Records chart of "Most Played by Jockeys".

Atkins re-recorded "Mister Sandman" for his 1990 album The Magic of Chet Atkins.

=== Credits and personnel ===
- Chet Atkins – Guitar
- Bud Isaacs – Steel guitar
- Marvin Hughes – Piano / Celeste
- Ernie Newton – Bass
- Buddy Harman – Drums
- Stephen H. Sholes – Producer

== Bert Kaempfert version ==
In 1968, Bert Kaempfert and His Orchestra released an instrumental version as a single and on the album My Way of Life. It reached No. 12 on Billboard's Easy Listening chart, No. 14 on Record World's "Top Non-Rock" chart, No. 3 on Record World's chart of "Singles Coming Up", and No. 1 on Cash Box's "Looking Ahead" chart of singles with potential of entering the Cash Box Top 100.

== Emmylou Harris version ==
"Mister Sandman"
- German and Austrian vinyl picture sleeve

Single by Emmylou Harris
- B-side: "Rose of Cimarron"
- Released: 1981
- Recorded: 1980
- Genre: Country pop
- Length: 2:20
- Label: Warner Bros. Nashville
- Songwriter: Pat Ballard
- Producer: Brian Ahern

Emmylou Harris singles chronology
"The Boxer" (1980)	"Mister Sandman" (1981)	"I Don't Have to Crawl" (1981)

In January 1978, Emmylou Harris, Dolly Parton, and Linda Ronstadt recorded a version of the song for a planned trio album which was ultimately scrapped. (The three would eventually reunite and release the first of two Trio albums nearly a decade later in 1987). Harris included the trio recording of "Mr. Sandman" on her 1981 album Evangeline, though with the stipulation that it not be released as a single (given that Parton and Ronstadt were both affiliated with other record labels). However, when Harris later changed her mind and wanted to put the song out as a single, she rerecorded it, singing all three parts herself, and releasing it in 1981, under the title "Mister Sandman". The single reached number 10 on the Billboard Hot Country Singles chart, and number 37 on the Billboard Hot 100, making it Harris' only single to reach the top 40 on that chart.

Harris's single version did not appear on an album until the 1984 compilation Profile II: The Best of Emmylou Harris.

=== Credits and personnel ===
Evangeline version

- Emmylou Harris – lead and backing vocals
- Dolly Parton – backing vocals
- Linda Ronstadt – backing vocals
- James Burton – electric guitar
- Brian Ahern – acoustic guitar
- Glen D. Hardin – electric piano
- Mike Bowden – bass
- Hal Blaine – drums

=== Charts ===
Chart (1981)	Peak position
Australia (Kent Music Report)	19
Austria (Ö3 Hit wähl mit)	15
Canada RPM 50 Singles	42
Canada RPM Country 50 Singles	1
Belgium Flanders	8
Netherlands (Dutch Top 40)	8
Netherlands (Nationale Hitparade)	9
New Zealand Singles Chart	16
Swiss Hitparade	5
US Billboard Hot 100	37
US Billboard Adult Contemporary	8
US Billboard Hot Country Singles	10
US Cash Box Top 100 Singles	37
US Cash Box Top 100 Country	9
US Record World Singles	40
US Record World A/C Chart	12
US Record World Country Singles	9
West Germany (Media Control)	14

==== Year-end charts ====
Chart (1981)	Position
Belgium (Ultratop Flanders)	73
Netherlands (Dutch Top 40)	83
West Germany (Official German Charts)	35

== Other versions ==
- Buddy Morrow and His Orchestra released a version in 1954, which reached No. 20 on Billboard's chart of "Most Played by Jockeys".
- Mervin Shiner released a version in 1954.
- In January 1955, a version by Max Bygraves reached No. 16 on the UK's New Musical Express chart.
- The most successful recording of the song in the UK was by Dickie Valentine, which peaked at No. 5 on the New Musical Express chart in February 1955.
- The Fleetwoods released a version in 1964, as a single and on the album Before and After. Their version reached No. 113 on Billboard's Bubbling Under the Hot 100 chart and No. 19 on Cash Box's "Looking Ahead" chart of singles with potential of entering the Cash Box Top 100.
- Tommy O'Day released a version in 1978, which reached No. 96 on Billboard's Hot Country Singles chart.
- German power metal band Blind Guardian covered the song on their 1996 compilation album The Forgotten Tales.
- The Canadian country music and alternative rock singer Nan Vernon covered the song, for the Rob Zombie adaption of Halloween.
- In 2017 SYML released a cover, which was described as "an ominous and brooding song full of dark waves of emotion."
- Ballard also rewrote the lyrics for Christmas use as "Mr. Santa". Singer Dorothy Collins released "Mr. Santa" in 1955, which reached No. 51 in Music Vendor.
- The music was covered in the commercial to promote a McDonald's Big N' Tasty burgers under the song "Come Around Now, Make Me a Dream".
- Canadian science communicator Tim Blais made a parody of the song about the CRISPR process, calling it "CRISPR Cas-9, bring me a gene".
