= White Shoes =

Studio album by Emmylou Harris
- Released: October 1983
- Genre: Country
- Length: 34:47
- Label: Warner Bros.
- Producer: Brian Ahern

Emmylou Harris chronology
Last Date (1982)	White Shoes (1983)	Profile II: The Best of Emmylou Harris (1984)

Singles from White Shoes
- 1. "Drivin' Wheel" Released: August 1983; 2. "In My Dreams" Released: March 24, 1984

White Shoes is the tenth studio album by Emmylou Harris, released in 1983. The album includes a rockish version of "Diamonds Are a Girl's Best Friend", a country remake of the Donna Summer hit "On the Radio", and a version of Sandy Denny's "Like an Old Fashioned Waltz". Both "In My Dreams" and "Pledging My Love" hit the No. 9 position on the Billboard country music singles chart in 1984.

"In My Dreams" won for Emmylou Harris her third Grammy Award for Best Female Country Vocal Performance at the 27th Annual Grammy Awards. The song was written by Paul Kennerley, who would become Emmylou Harris' third husband in 1985.

== Production ==
White Shoes was produced by Brian Ahern, and would be the last album that Harris would record with him until her Grammy-nominated album All I Intended to Be in 2008. They would divorce the year after this album was released.

== Critical reception ==
Professional ratings
Review scores
Source	Rating
AllMusic	3/5 stars
The Encyclopedia of Popular Music	3/5 stars
MusicHound Folk: The Essential Album Guide	3/5 stars
The Rolling Stone Album Guide	3.5/5 stars

The Philadelphia Inquirer wrote that "there's a hoarse, quavery quality in Harris' voice that's a welcome relief from the crisp, crystalline warbling that's long been her trademark."

== Track listing ==
No.	Title	Writer(s)	Length
1.	"Drivin' Wheel"	T-Bone Burnett, Billy Swan	3:10
2.	"Pledging My Love"	Don Robey, Fats Washington	3:00
3.	"In My Dreams"	Paul Kennerley	3:15
4.	"White Shoes"	Jack Tempchin	3:30
5.	"On the Radio"	Giorgio Moroder, Donna Summer	5:11
6.	"It's Only Rock 'n' Roll"	Rodney Crowell	2:55
7.	"Diamonds Are a Girl's Best Friend"	Leo Robin, Jule Styne	3:39
8.	"Good News"	Shirley Eikhard	3:52
9.	"Baby, Better Start Turnin' 'Em Down"	Crowell	3:04
10.	"Like an Old Fashioned Waltz"	Sandy Denny	3:11

== Personnel ==
- Emmylou Harris – vocals, acoustic guitar, backing vocals
- Brian Ahern – acoustic guitar, electric guitar, bass, 6-string bass, percussion, tambourine
- Barbara Bennett – backing vocals
- Mike Bowden – bass
- Bonnie Bramlett – backing vocals
- Tony Brown – piano, electric piano
- T Bone Burnett – acoustic guitar, electric guitar, percussion, backing vocals
- Rodney Crowell – acoustic guitar
- Hank DeVito – steel guitar
- Shirley Eikhard – backing vocals
- Steve Fishell – steel guitar, Melobar
- Wayne Goodwin – baritone saxophone
- Glen D. Hardin – electric piano, string arrangements
- Don Heffington – drums
- Jim Horn – recorders
- Don Johnson – piano, electric piano, backing vocals
- Keith Knudsen – drums
- John McFee – acoustic guitar, electric guitar
- Bill Payne – piano, electric piano, keyboards, synthesizer
- Mickey Raphael – harmonica
- Frank Reckard – electric guitar
- Barry Tashian – acoustic guitar, backing vocals
- John Ware – drums

Technical personnel

- Brian Ahern – producer, engineer
- Donivan Cowart – engineer
- Stuart Taylor – engineer
- Alan Vachon – engineer

== Charts ==
=== Weekly charts ===
Chart (1983–1984)	Peak position
US Billboard 200	116
US Top Country Albums (Billboard)	22

=== Year-end charts ===
Chart (1984)	Position
US Top Country Albums (Billboard)	42

== Release history ==
Release history and formats for White Shoes
Region	Date	Format	Label	Ref.
North America	October 1983	LP; cassette	Warner Bros. Records	
