= Profile II: The Best of Emmylou Harris =

Compilation album by Emmylou Harris
- Released: September 17, 1984
- Genre: Country
- Length: 32:09
- Label: Warner Bros.
- Producer: Brian Ahern

Emmylou Harris chronology
| White Shoes (1983) | Profile II: The Best of Emmylou Harris (1984) | The Ballad of Sally Rose (1985) |

Singles from Profile II: The Best of Emmylou Harris
- 1. "Someone Like You" Released: October 1984

Professional ratings
Review scores
| Source | Rating |
|---|---|
| AllMusic | 4.5/5 stars |

Profile II: The Best of Emmylou Harris is a compilation of hits by Emmylou Harris originally from five of her albums released between 1979 and 1983 (Blue Kentucky Girl, Roses in the Snow, Evangeline, Cimarron, Last Date, and White Shoes), plus two singles, "Someone Like You", a new tune which became a Billboard #26 country hit in early 1985, and lacks the backup vocals of Dolly Parton and Linda Ronstadt featured on Evangeline.

Unlike her prior compilation, which collected all of her singles and two album tracks, Profile II omits several singles released during this period, including her duet with Roy Orbison, "That Lovin' You Feelin' Again" (from the Roadie soundtrack), "The Boxer" (from Roses in the Snow), "I Don't Have To Crawl" (from Evangeline), "If I Needed You" and "Tennessee Rose" (from Cimarron), "So Sad (To Watch Good Love Go Bad)" (from Last Date), and "In My Dreams" and "Drivin' Wheel" (from White Shoes).

== Track listing ==
| No. | Title | Writer(s) | Original Album | Length |
|---|---|---|---|---|
| 1. | "Blue Kentucky Girl" | Johnny Mullins | Blue Kentucky Girl (1979) | 3:16 |
| 2. | "Wayfaring Stranger" | Traditional; arranged by Brian Ahern | Roses in the Snow (1980) | 3:25 |
| 3. | "Beneath Still Waters" | Dallas Frazier | Blue Kentucky Girl | 3:40 |
| 4. | "Born to Run" | Paul Kennerley | Cimarron (1981) | 3:43 |
| 5. | "Someone Like You" | Bob McDill, Dickey Lee | New song | 3:14 |
| 6. | "Mr. Sandman" | Pat Ballard | Evangeline (1981) | 2:18 |
| 7. | "Pledging My Love" | Don Robey, Fats Washington | White Shoes (1983) | 2:57 |
| 8. | "I'm Movin' On" | Hank Snow | Last Date (1982) | 2:38 |
| 9. | "(Lost His Love) On Our Last Date" | Conway Twitty, Floyd Cramer | Last Date | 3:20 |
| 10. | "Save the Last Dance for Me" | Doc Pomus, Mort Shuman | Blue Kentucky Girl | 3:38 |
| Total length: | | | | 32:09 |

== Chart performance ==
| Chart (1984) | Peak position |
|---|---|
| U.S. Billboard Top Country Albums | 24 |
| U.S. Billboard 200 | 176 |

== Release history ==
Release history and formats for Profile II: The Best of Emmylou Harris
| Region | Date | Format | Label | Ref. |
|---|---|---|---|---|
| North America | November 1978 | CD; LP; cassette | Warner Bros. Records | |
