= There's No Love in Tennessee =

Single by Barbara Mandrell

from the album Greatest Hits
- B-side: "Sincerely I'm Yours"
- Released: February 18, 1985
- Genre: Country
- Length: 3:26
- Label: MCA
- Songwriter(s): Stephen Allen Davis, Dennis Morgan
- Producer(s): Tom Collins

Barbara Mandrell singles chronology
"It Should Have Been Love by Now" (1985)	"There's No Love in Tennessee" (1985)	"Angel in Your Arms" (1985)

"There's No Love in Tennessee" is a song written by Stephen Allen Davis and Dennis Morgan, and it was recorded by American country music artist Barbara Mandrell. It was released in February 1985 as the first single from her Greatest Hits compilation album. The song reached number 7 on the Billboard Hot Country Singles & Tracks chart.

== Chart performance ==
Chart (1985)	Peak position
US Hot Country Songs (Billboard)	7
Canadian RPM Country Tracks	24
