= If I Could Just Go Home =

Studio album by Ed Bruce
- Released: March 1968
- Recorded: September 1966–September 1967, RCA Victor Studio, Nashville
- Genre: Country and western
- Length: 30:24
- Label: RCA Victor (LSP-3948)
- Producer: Bob Ferguson

Ed Bruce chronology
If I Could Just Go Home (1968)	Shades of Ed Bruce (1969)

If I Could Just Go Home is the first album by country artist Ed Bruce, released in 1968. The album contains newly recorded songs, with the exception of five tracks that had previously been featured on single releases between 1966 and 1967. The album reached No. 44 on the Billboard Top Country Albums chart.

== Track listing ==
All tracks are written by Ed Bruce, except where noted.

No.	Title	Writer(s)	Original release	Length
1.	"I Know Better"			2:38
2.	"Why Can't I Come Home?"			2:17
3.	"Walker's Woods"	Kay Arnold	"Lonesome Is Me" (B-side, 1966)	2:37
4.	"Ninety-seven More to Go"			2:13
5.	"If I Could Just Go Home"			3:40
6.	"Give More Than You Take"			2:29
7.	"By Route of New Orleans"	Sonny Moore		2:30
8.	"Shadows of Her Mind"	Kris Kristofferson	"Her Sweet Love and the Baby" (B-side, 1967)	2:44
9.	"Lonesome Is Me"		1966	2:20
10.	"The Price I Pay to Stay"			2:31
11.	"I'm Getting Better"		"Last Train to Clarksville" (B-side, 1967)	2:06
12.	"Her Sweet Love and the Baby"		1967	2:24
Total length:				30:24

== Personnel ==
- Ed Bruce - vocals
- Louis Nunley, Bergen White, Marijohn Wilkin, Dorothy Ann Dillard, Glenn Baxter, Priscilla Hubbard, Mary Greene, William Wright - other vocals
- Wayne Moss, Jerry Reed, Fred Carter Jr., Jack Eubanks - lead guitar
- Ray Edenton, Jerry Shook - rhythm guitar
- Pete Drake - steel guitar
- Henry Strzelecki, Norbert Putnam - bass guitar
- Bobby Dyson - electric bass
- Jerry Carrigan - drums
- Jerry Smith - piano
- John Hartford - banjo
- Charlie McCoy, Onie Wheeler - harmonica
- Harold Cruthirds, Sadao Harada - cello
- Marvin Chantry, Gary Vanosdale - viola
- Brenton Banks, Kazuhide Isomura, Byron Williams - violin
