= In Times Like These (song) =

Single by Barbara Mandrell

from the album Spun Gold
- B-side: "Loveless"
- Released: April 1983
- Genre: Country
- Length: 2:54
- Label: MCA
- Songwriter(s): Kye Fleming, Dennis Morgan
- Producer(s): Tom Collins

Barbara Mandrell singles chronology
"Operator, Long Distance Please" (1982)	"In Times Like These" (1983)	"One of a Kind Pair of Fools" (1983)

"'In Times Like These" is a song written by Kye Fleming and Dennis Morgan, and recorded by American country music artist Barbara Mandrell. It was released in April 1983 as the lead single from the album Spun Gold. It peaked at number 4 on the U.S. Billboard Hot Country Singles chart and number 6 on the Canadian RPM Country Tracks chart.

== Charts ==
=== Weekly charts ===
Chart (1983)	Peak position
US Hot Country Songs (Billboard)	4
Canadian RPM Country Tracks	6

=== Year-end charts ===
Chart (1983)	Position
US Hot Country Songs (Billboard)	50
