= My First Taste of Texas =

Single by Ed Bruce

from the album I Write It Down
- B-side: "One More Shot at Old Back Home Again"
- Released: January 17, 1983
- Genre: Country
- Length: 4:06
- Label: MCA 52156
- Songwriter(s): Ed Bruce, Ronnie Rogers
- Producer(s): Tommy West

Ed Bruce singles chronology
| "Ever, Never Lovin' You" (1982) | "My First Taste of Texas" (1983) | "You're Not Leaving Here Tonight" (1983) |

"My First Taste of Texas" is a song co-written and recorded by American country music artist Ed Bruce. It was released in January 1983 as the second single from his album I Write It Down. The song reached number 6 on the Billboard Hot Country Singles chart. Bruce wrote the song with Ronnie Rogers.

== Chart performance ==
| Chart (1983) | Peak position |
|---|---|
| US Hot Country Songs (Billboard) | 6 |
| Canadian RPM Country Tracks | 33 |
