= Crossword Puzzle (Barbara Mandrell song) =

Single by Barbara Mandrell

from the album Clean Cut
- B-side: "If It's Not One Thing It's Another"
- Released: September 10, 1984
- Recorded: January 1984
- Genre: Country-pop; Countrypolitan
- Length: 3:32
- Label: MCA
- Songwriters: Steve Dean; Frank J. Myers
- Producer: Tom Collins

Barbara Mandrell singles chronology
"To Me" (1984)	"Crossword Puzzle" (1984)	"It Should Have Been Love by Now" (1985)

"Crossword Puzzle" is a song written by Steve Dean and Frank J. Myers, and recorded by American country music artist Barbara Mandrell. It was released in September 1984 as the third single from the album Clean Cut. It reached the top twenty of the American country songs chart.

== Background and recording ==
In the 1980s, Barbara Mandrell had a series of number one and top ten country singles. With a collaboration from producer Tom Collins, Mandrell had her biggest success as a country music artist during this period. One of the singles she cut during this period was 1984's "Crossword Puzzle". It was written by Steve Dean and Frank J. Myers. Collins produced the track's recording session in January 1984 in Nashville, Tennessee.

== Release and chart performance ==
"Crossword Puzzle" was released as a single on MCA Records in September 1984. It was backed on the B-side by the song "If It's Not One Thing It's Another". The track was issued by the label as a seven inch vinyl single. The single spent 20 weeks on America's Billboard country songs chart, peaking at number 11 by December 1984. In Canada, the single climbed to into the top ten of the RPM country chart. The song was spawned from Mandrell's 1984 studio album titled Clean Cut.

== Track listing ==
7" vinyl single

- "Crossword Puzzle" – 3:32
- "If It's Not One Thing It's Another" – 3:46

== Charts ==
Chart performance for "Crossword Puzzle"
Chart (1984)	Peak position
Canada Country Songs (RPM)	10
US Hot Country Songs (Billboard)	11
