= To Me =

Single by Lee Greenwood and Barbara Mandrell

from the album Meant for Each Other
- B-side: "We Were Meant for Each Other"
- Released: July 2, 1984
- Genre: Country
- Length: 3:06
- Label: MCA
- Songwriter(s): Mike Reid, Mack David
- Producer(s): Tom Collins

Lee Greenwood singles chronology
"God Bless the USA" (1984)	"To Me" (1984)	"Fool's Gold" (1984)

Barbara Mandrell singles chronology
"Only a Lonely Heart Knows" (1984)	"To Me" (1984)	"Crossword Puzzle" (1984)

"To Me" is a song written by Mike Reid and Mack David, and recorded by American country music artists Lee Greenwood and Barbara Mandrell. It was released in July 1984 as the first single from the album Meant for Each Other. The song reached number 3 on the Billboard Hot Country Singles & Tracks chart.

== Charts ==
=== Weekly charts ===
Chart (1984)	Peak position
US Hot Country Songs (Billboard)	3
Canadian RPM Country Tracks	5

=== Year-end charts ===
Chart (1984)	Position
US Hot Country Songs (Billboard)	32
