= Christmas at Our House =

Studio album by Barbara Mandrell
- Released: October 29, 1984
- Recorded: July 1984 (Nashville, TN)
- Genre: Christmas music, country pop
- Length: 37:13
- Label: MCA
- Producer: Tom Collins

Barbara Mandrell chronology
Meant for Each Other (1984)	Christmas at Our House (1984)	Greatest Hits (1985)

Professional ratings
Review scores
Source	Rating
Allmusic	3/5 stars

Christmas at Our House is the fifteenth solo studio album by the American country artist Barbara Mandrell. The album was released in October 1984 on MCA Records and was produced by Tom Collins. It was Mandrell's first album of Christmas music.

== Background and content ==
Christmas at Our House, as described by Bradley Torreano of Allmusic, "shows the country star adding her name to the countless musicians who have released personalized Christmas albums." The album includes ten tracks, including some new material. It includes two tributes of the Christmas season, the title track and "From Our House to Yours", which Torreano described as "down home". It also includes cover versions of Christmas standards such as "I'll Be Home for Christmas" and "Winter Wonderland"; it also introduced what would become a holiday standard, "It Must Have Been the Mistletoe (Our First Christmas)". Torreano gave the album three out of five stars staying, "Her brand of country-pop may not appeal to all fans of the genre, but many country listeners will probably find this a nice Christmas album to play for the holidays."

== Release ==
Christmas at Our House was Mandrell's third album released in 1984, officially issued in October. The album peaked at #31 on the Billboard Top Country Albums chart in 1984. No singles were released from the album and it was her first album not to reach the Billboard 200 albums chart since He Set My Life to Music in 1982. Christmas at Our House was originally released as a vinyl LP record on MCA Records in 1984, with five songs on each side. It was reissued as a compact disc by MCA many years later.

== Track listing ==
Side One
No.	Title	Length
1.	"Christmas at Our House" (Archie Jordan, Don Pfrimmer)	2:52
2.	"Winter Wonderland" (Felix Bernard, Richard B. Smith)	2:39
3.	"This Time of the Year" (Jessie Hollis, Cliff Owens)	2:56
4.	"Santa, Bring My Baby Home" (W.T. Davidson, R. Hatch)	3:08
5.	"One Night A Year" (R.C. Bannon, John Bettis)	3:57

Side Two
No.	Title	Length
1.	"I'll Be Home for Christmas" (Buck Ram, Kim Gannon, Walter Kent)	3:13
2.	"It Must Have Been the Mistletoe (Our First Christmas)" (Doug Konecky, Justin Wilde)	3:13
3.	"From Our House to Yours" (Lisa Angelle, John Schweers)	4:05
4.	"Born to Die" (Shireen Salyer)	4:10
5.	"The Christmas Story"	7:31

== Personnel ==
- Eddie Bayers – drums
- Pete Bordonali – acoustic guitar, guitar, electric guitar
- Thomas Brannon – backing vocals
- David Briggs – piano, synthesizer
- Lori Brooks – backing vocals
- James Capps – acoustic guitar
- Jimmy Capps – guitar, piano, synthesizer
- Phillip Forest – backing vocals
- Sherilyn Huffman – backing vocals
- David Hungate – bass guitar
- John Jarvis – synthesizer
- Shane Keister – piano, synthesizer
- Barbara Mandrell – lead vocals
- Farrell Morris – percussion
- The Nashville Horn Works – horn
- Nashville String Machine – strings
- Louis Dean Nunley – backing vocals
- Brent Rowan – electric guitar
- Lisa Silver – backing vocals
- Diane Tidwell – backing vocals
- Bergen White – arrangements, string arrangements

== Sales chart positions ==
Album

Chart (1984)	Peak position
U.S. Top Country Albums	31
