= You're the Best Break This Old Heart Ever Had =

Single by Ed Bruce

from the album One to One
- B-side: "It Just Makes Me Want You More"
- Released: November 28, 1981
- Genre: Country
- Length: 3:20
- Label: MCA
- Songwriter(s): Wayland Holyfield, Randy Hatch
- Producer(s): Tommy West

Ed Bruce singles chronology
"(When You Fall in Love) Everything's a Waltz" (1981)	"You're the Best Break This Old Heart Ever Had" (1981)	"Love's Found You and Me" (1982)

"You're the Best Break This Old Heart Ever Had" is a song written by Wayland Holyfield and Randy Hatch, and recorded by American country music artist Ed Bruce. It was released in November 1981 as the third single from the album One to One. The song was Bruce's 22nd country hit and his only number one. The single went to number one for one week in March 1982, and spent 21 weeks on the charts.

== Charts ==
=== Weekly charts ===
Chart (1981–1982)	Peak position
US Hot Country Songs (Billboard)	1
Canadian RPM Country Tracks	10

=== Year-end charts ===
Chart (1982)	Position
US Hot Country Songs (Billboard)	14
