= Nights (Ed Bruce song) =

Single by Ed Bruce

from the album Night Things
- B-side: "Fifteen to Forty-Three (Man in the Mirror)"
- Released: April 12, 1986
- Genre: Country
- Length: 2:59
- Label: RCA
- Songwriter(s): Byron Hill, Tony Hiller
- Producer(s): Blake Mevis

Ed Bruce singles chronology
"If It Ain't Love" (1985)	"Nights" (1986)	"Fools for Each Other" (1986)

"Nights" is a song written by Byron Hill and Tony Hiller, and recorded by American country music artist Ed Bruce. It was released in April 1986 as the first single from the album Night Things. The song reached number 4 on the Billboard Hot Country Singles & Tracks chart.

== Chart history ==
Chart (1986)	Peak position
US Hot Country Songs (Billboard)	4
Canadian RPM Country Tracks	11
