= One of a Kind Pair of Fools =

Single by Barbara Mandrell

from the album Spun Gold
- B-side: "As Well as Can Be Expected"
- Released: July 1983
- Genre: Country
- Length: 2:48
- Label: MCA
- Songwriter(s): R.C. Bannon; John Bettis
- Producer(s): Tom Collins

Barbara Mandrell singles chronology
| "In Times Like These" (1983) | "One of a Kind Pair of Fools" (1983) | "Happy Birthday Dear Heartache" (1984) |

"One of a Kind Pair of Fools" is a song written by R.C. Bannon and John Bettis, and recorded by American country music artist Barbara Mandrell. It was released in July 1983 as the second and final single from the album Spun Gold. The song was the last of six number one country singles for Mandrell. The single went to number one for one week and spent a total of fourteen weeks on the country chart.

== Chart performance ==
| Chart (1983) | Peak position |
|---|---|
| US Hot Country Songs (Billboard) | 1 |
| Canadian RPM Country Tracks | 1 |
