= Homecoming (Ed Bruce album) =

Studio album by Ed Bruce
- Released: 1984
- Genre: Country
- Length: 32:20
- Label: RCA
- Producer: Blake Mevis

Ed Bruce chronology
| Tell 'Em I've Gone Crazy (1984) | Homecoming (1984) | Greatest Hits (1985) |

Homecoming is the fourteenth studio album by American country music artist Ed Bruce. It was released in 1985 via RCA Records. The includes the singles "You Turn Me On (Like a Radio)", "If It Ain't Love" and "When Giving Up Was Easy".

== Track listing ==
| No. | Title | Writer(s) | Length |
|---|---|---|---|
| 1. | "You Turn Me On (Like a Radio)" | Bob McDill, Jim Weatherly | 3:27 |
| 2. | "That's How It Goes" | J. Martin Johnson, Bucky Jones | 3:00 |
| 3. | "I Think I Could Love You (Better Than He Did)" | Debbie Hupp, Bob Morrison | 2:39 |
| 4. | "Texas Girl, I'm Closing in on You" | Ed Bruce, Ron Peterson | 3:28 |
| 5. | "The Great Divide" | J. D. Martin, Gary Harrison | 3:10 |
| 6. | "When Giving Up Was Easy" | Keith Palmer | 3:25 |
| 7. | "If It Ain't Love" | Mark Nesler | 2:45 |
| 8. | "The Migrant" | Tony Joe White | 3:51 |
| 9. | "Old Loves Never Die" | Warren Robb, Dave Kirby | 2:49 |
| 10. | "Forever Lovin' Me" | Bruce, Peterson | 2:46 |

== Chart performance ==
| Chart (1984) | Peak position |
|---|---|
| US Top Country Albums (Billboard) | 41 |
