= After All (Ed Bruce song) =

Single by Ed Bruce

from the album You're Not Leavin' Here Tonight
- B-side: "It Would Take a Fool"
- Released: October 1983
- Genre: Country
- Length: 3:39
- Label: MCA 52295
- Songwriter(s): Ed Bruce, Patsy Bruce
- Producer(s): Tommy West

Ed Bruce singles chronology
"If It Was Easy" (1983)	"After All" (1983)	"Tell 'em I've Gone Crazy" (1984)

"After All" is a song co-written and recorded by American country music artist Ed Bruce. It was released in October 1983 as the third and final single from his album You're Not Leavin' Here Tonight. The song reached number 4 on the Billboard Hot Country Singles chart. Bruce wrote the song with his wife Patsy.

== Chart performance ==
Chart (1983–1984)	Peak position
US Hot Country Songs (Billboard)	4
Canadian RPM Country Tracks	4
