= Clean Cut =

Studio album by Barbara Mandrell
- Released: March 27, 1984
- Recorded: January 1984 (Nashville, TN)
- Studio: Woodland (Nashville, Tennessee)
- Genre: Country pop
- Length: 32:37
- Label: MCA
- Producer: Tom Collins

Barbara Mandrell chronology
Spun Gold (1983)	Clean Cut (1984)	Meant for Each Other (1984)

Singles from Clean Cut
- 1. "Happy Birthday Dear Heartache" Released: January 30, 1984; 2. "Only a Lonely Heart Knows" Released: May 21, 1984; 3. "Crossword Puzzle" Released: September 10, 1984

Clean Cut is the fourteenth solo studio album by American country music artist Barbara Mandrell. The album was released in March 1984 on MCA Records and was produced by Tom Collins. It was one of two studio albums Mandrell released in 1984.

== Background and content ==
Clean Cut was recorded in January 1984 at the Woodland Sound Studios in Nashville, Tennessee, United States. Like Mandrell's previous releases, the album contained 10 tracks. Most of the song's themes were built around the traditional working class country music perspective but had a country pop arrangement. Songs such as "Only a Lonely Heart Knows", "Happy Birthday Dear Heartache", and "I Can Depend on You" had a significant pop-sounding arrangement. Like most of Barbara's MCA output, Clean Cut was only ever issued on a long-playing record, with five songs per side.

== Release ==
Unlike her previous releases, Clean Cut spawned three singles in 1984. "Happy Birthday Dear Heartache" was the first single from the album released in January 1984. The song peaked at No. 3 on the Billboard Magazine Country Singles Chart and No. 18 on the Canadian RPM Country Tracks chart. The second single, "Only a Lonely Heart Knows" was issued in May 1984 and reached No. 2 on the Billboard Country Singles Chart and became her final number one hit on the Canadian Country chart. "Crossword Puzzle" was the third and final single released from the album, reaching No. 11 on the Billboard Country chart, becoming her first single since 1981 to miss the Top 10 on the chart. Clean Cut was also released in 1984 and peaked at No. 8 on the Billboard Magazine Top Country Albums chart and peaked outside the Billboard 200 albums chart, reaching No. 204.

== Track listing ==
Side one

1. "Happy Birthday Dear Heartache" (Mack David, Archie Jordan) – 2:34
2. "If It's Not One Thing, It's Another" (Steve Dean, Frank J. Myers) – 3:48
3. "I Can Depend on You" (Dennis Morgan, Stephen Allen Davis) – 3:54
4. "I Wonder What the Rich Folk Are Doin' Tonight" (W. T. Davidson, Myers, Dean) – 2:49
5. "Crossword Puzzle" (Dean, Myers) – 3:37

Side two

1. "Only a Lonely Heart Knows" (Morgan, Davis) – 3:48
2. "Just Like Old Times" (Rafe Van Hoy, Deborah Allen) – 2:58
3. "Look What Love Has Done" (Morgan, Davis) – 3:21
4. "Take Care of You" (Morgan, Davis) – 3:00
5. "Sincerely, I'm Yours" (David, Jordan) – 2:48

== Personnel ==
- Acoustic Guitar: Pete Bordonali, Jimmy Capps, Dennis Morgan, Frank J. Myers
- Banjo: Fred Newell
- Bass guitar: David Hungate, Joe Osborn
- Drums: Eddie Bayers, James Stroud
- Electric guitar: Pete Bordonali, Larry Byrom, Jon Goin
- Fiddle: Hoot Hester
- Harmonica: Terry McMillan
- Piano: David Briggs, Bobby Ogdin
- Rhodes Piano: David Briggs, Bobby Ogdin
- Slide Guitar: Larry Byrom
- Steel Guitar: Sonny Garrish
- Strings: The Nashville String Machine
- String Arranger: Archie Jordan, D. Bergen White
- Synthesizer: Bobby Ogdin, Alan Steinberger
- Tambourine: Tim Farmer, James Stroud

== Charts ==
=== Weekly charts ===
Chart (1984)	Peak position
US Top Country Albums (Billboard)	8

=== Year-end charts ===
Chart (1984)	Position
US Top Country Albums (Billboard)	37

=== Singles ===
Year	Song	Chart positions	
Year	Song	US Country	CAN Country
1984	"Happy Birthday Dear Heartache"	3	18
1984	"Only a Lonely Heart Knows"	2	1
1984	"Crossword Puzzle"	11	10
