= Meant for Each Other =

Studio album by Lee Greenwood and Barbara Mandrell
- Released: August 6, 1984
- Recorded: December 1983 (Nashville, TN)
- Studios: Woodland (Nashville, Tennessee)
- Genre: Country
- Length: 32:09
- Label: MCA
- Producer: Tom Collins

Lee Greenwood chronology
You've Got a Good Love Comin' (1984)	Meant for Each Other (1984)	Streamline (1985)

Barbara Mandrell chronology
Clean Cut (1984)	Meant for Each Other (1984)	Christmas at Our House (1984)

Singles from Meant for Each Other
- 1. "To Me" Released: June 25, 1984; 2. "It Should Have Been Love by Now" Released: January 7, 1985

Professional ratings
Review scores
Source	Rating
Allmusic	3/5 stars

Meant for Each Other is a collaborative studio album by American country music artists Lee Greenwood and Barbara Mandrell. The album was released on August 6, 1984, by MCA Records and was produced by Tom Collins. It was the first and only collaboration effort between Greenwood and Mandrell.

== Background and content ==
Meant for Each Other was recorded at the Woodland Sound Studios in Nashville, Tennessee in December 1983. The album consisted of 10 duets performed by Lee Greenwood and Barbara Mandrell. The album's fifth track, "We Were Meant for Each Other" was written by Greenwood and also served as the album's title track. The opening track, "To Me" was co-written by Mike Reid, who also was a National Football League player in the early 1970s. Most of the album's material contained a country pop arrangement for most of the tracks. Meant for Each Other was released on an original LP album upon its release in 1984, with five songs included on each side of the record.

Meant for Each Other received three out of five stars by Allmusic, without a review provided.

== Release ==
Meant for Each Other's lead single, "To Me" was released in July 1984. The single became a Top 5 hit, reaching #3 on the Billboard Magazine Hot Country Singles & Tracks chart and #24 on the Billboard Hot Adult Contemporary Tracks chart. In addition, the song also peaked at #5 on the Canadian RPM Country Tracks chart. The second and final single released was "It Should Have Been Love by Now" in January 1985. The song became a Top 20 hit, reaching #19 on Billboard's Country Singles chart and #35 on Billboard's Hot Adult Contemporary Tracks chart. The single also peaked at #12 on the Canadian Country chart. Meant for Each Other was released in 1984, peaking at #5 on the Billboard Magazine Top Country Albums chart and #89 on the Billboard 200 albums chart.

== Track listing ==
No.	Title	Writer(s)	Length
1.	"To Me"	Mack David, Mike Reid	3:12
2.	"Can't Get Too Much of a Good Thing"	J. D. Martin, Dennis Morgan	3:07
3.	"I'll Never Stop Loving You"	Michael David, Steve Dean	2:56
4.	"We're a Perfect Match"	Cal Freeman, Stan Munsey	3:07
5.	"We Were Meant for Each Other"	Lee Greenwood	3:03
6.	"It Should Have Been Love by Now"	Jan Crutchfield, Paul Harrison	3:04
7.	"Soft Shoulder"	Morgan, Don Pfrimmer	3:19
8.	"Now You See Us, Now You Don't"	Crutchfield, Harrison	3:39
9.	"One on One, Eye to Eye, Heart to Heart"	Stephen Allen Davis, Morgan	3:29
10.	"Held Over"	Jerry Fuller	3:16

== Personnel ==
  - As noted at allmusic
- Barbara Mandrell and Lee Greenwood - lead vocals
- Cindy Richardson, Lisa Silver - backing vocals
- Diane Tidwell - synthesizers, backing vocals
- David Briggs, Bobby Ogdin - piano and synthesizers
- Alan Steinberger - synthesizers
- Peter Bordonali, Steve Gibson, Reggie Young - guitar
- David Hungate, Jack Williams - bass
- Eddie Bayers - drums
- Terry McMillan - percussion, harmonica
- Quitman Dennis, Donald Sanders - saxophone
- Wayne Jackson - trombone, trumpet

== Charts ==
=== Weekly charts ===
Chart (1984)	Peak position
US Billboard 200	89
US Top Country Albums (Billboard)	5

=== Year-end charts ===
Chart (1985)	Position
US Top Country Albums (Billboard)	37

=== Singles ===
Year	Song	Chart positions		
Year	Song	US Country	US AC	CAN Country
1984	"To Me"	3	24	5
1985	"It Should Have Been Love by Now"	19	35	12
