= Pat Ballard =

American composer (1899–1960)

Pat Ballard, born Francis Drake Ballard (June 19, 1899 – October 26, 1960), was an American songwriter, producer, music editor and author.

== Life ==
He was born in Troy, Pennsylvania, to Frank Ballard, a jeweller-optician, and Lucille, a soprano. He was the great-great-grandson of Orrin P. Ballard, one of the pioneers of the region.

He was married to Hilda Gramlich, a dress designer. He died of a cardiac arrest at the Medical Arts Centre in New York City, New York, in 1960.

== Songs ==
He composed a number of songs with the most popular being "Mr. Sandman" and "(Oh Baby Mine) I Get So Lonely".

He was a member of the American Society of Composers, Authors and Publishers.
