= In My Dreams (Emmylou Harris song) =

Single by Emmylou Harris

from the album White Shoes
- B-side: "Like an Old Fashioned Waltz"
- Released: March 24, 1984
- Genre: Country
- Length: 3:18
- Label: Warner Bros. Nashville
- Songwriter(s): Paul Kennerley
- Producer(s): Brian Ahern

Emmylou Harris singles chronology
| "Drivin' Wheel" (1983) | "In My Dreams" (1984) | "Pledging My Love" (1984) |

"In My Dreams" is a song written by Paul Kennerley, and recorded by American country music artist Emmylou Harris. It was released in March 1984 as the second single from the album White Shoes. The song reached number 9 on the Billboard Hot Country Singles & Tracks chart.

The single won for Emmylou Harris her third Grammy Award for Best Female Country Vocal Performance at the 27th Annual Grammy Awards.

== Chart performance ==
| Chart (1984) | Peak position |
|---|---|
| US Hot Country Songs (Billboard) | 9 |
| Canadian RPM Country Tracks | 6 |
