= Only a Lonely Heart Knows =

Single by Barbara Mandrell

from the album Clean Cut
- B-side: "I Wonder What the Rich Folk Are Doin' Tonight"
- Released: May 1984
- Genre: Country
- Length: 3:48
- Label: MCA
- Songwriter(s): Stephen Allen Davis, Dennis Morgan
- Producer(s): Tom Collins

Barbara Mandrell singles chronology
"Happy Birthday Dear Heartache" (1984)	"Only a Lonely Heart Knows" (1984)	"To Me" (1984)

"Only a Lonely Heart Knows" is a song written by Stephen Allen Davis and Dennis Morgan, and recorded by American country music artist Barbara Mandrell. It was released in May 1984 as the second single from her album Clean Cut. The song reached number 2 on the Billboard Hot Country Singles chart in September 1984 and number 1 on the RPM Country Tracks chart in Canada.

== Charts ==
=== Weekly charts ===
Chart (1984)	Peak position
US Hot Country Songs (Billboard)	2
Canadian RPM Country Tracks	1

=== Year-end charts ===
Chart (1984)	Position
US Hot Country Songs (Billboard)	26
