= Happy Birthday Dear Heartache =

Single by Barbara Mandrell

from the album Clean Cut
- B-side: "A Man's Not A Man ('Til He's Loved By A Woman)"
- Released: January 1984
- Genre: Country
- Length: 2:27
- Label: MCA
- Songwriter(s): Archie Jordan, Mack David
- Producer(s): Tom Collins

Barbara Mandrell singles chronology
"One of a Kind Pair of Fools" (1983)	"Happy Birthday Dear Heartache" (1984)	"Only a Lonely Heart Knows" (1984)

"Happy Birthday Dear Heartache" is a song written by Archie Jordan and Mack David, and recorded by American country music artist Barbara Mandrell. It was released in January 1984 as the first single from the album Clean Cut. The song reached number 3 on the Billboard Hot Country Singles & Tracks chart.

== Content ==
The song is a bitter observance of the one-year anniversary of a breakup, set in terms of a birthday celebration. Instead of being in a celebratory mood, however, the woman observes "how big you've (the heartbreak) has grown" and that the guests of honor are "the blues, the memories and the tears." The breakup is so bitter that she observes at the end, "Same time, same place next year."

== Charts ==
=== Weekly charts ===
Chart (1984)	Peak position
US Hot Country Songs (Billboard)	3
Canadian RPM Country Tracks	5

=== Year-end charts ===
Chart (1984)	Position
US Hot Country Songs (Billboard)	48
