= Drivin' Wheel =

Single by Emmylou Harris

from the album White Shoes
- B-side: "Good News"
- Released: October 1983
- Recorded: August 1983
- Studio: Enactron Truck Studios
- Genre: Country
- Length: 3:08
- Label: Warner Bros.
- Songwriter(s): T Bone Burnett; Billy Swan
- Producer(s): Brian Ahern

Emmylou Harris singles chronology
"So Sad (To Watch Good Love Go Bad)" (1983)	"Drivin' Wheel" (1983)	"In My Dreams" (1984)

"Drivin' Wheel" is a song written by T Bone Burnett and Billy Swan, and recorded by American singer Emmylou Harris. It was released in October 1983 as the lead single from Harris' album White Shoes. The song reached charting positions in both the United States and Canada following its release.

== Background and recording ==
Emmylou Harris had a string of commercially successful and critically acclaimed recordings during the late 1970s and early 1980s. She topped the US and Canadian country charts with songs like "Sweet Dreams", "Two More Bottles of Wine" and "(Lost His Love) On Our Last Date". Harris had been recording with then-producer and husband Brian Ahern. Her last album with Ahern would White Shoes. Included on the album was the song "Drivin' Wheel". The song was written by T Bone Burnett and Billy Swan. It was recorded in August 1983 at Enactron Truck Studios, located in Los Angeles, California.

== Release, chart performance and reception ==
"Drivin' Wheel" served as the lead single from White Shoes. It was issued by Warner Bros. Records in October 1983. It was backed on the B-side by the song "Good News". The single was distributed as a seven-inch vinyl single. "Drivin' Wheel" entered the US Billboard Hot Country Songs chart in November 1983. It spent 13 weeks there, reaching the number 26 position in January 1984. The song reached the top 20 of the Canadian RPM Country Tracks chart, reaching the number 13 position around the same period. When reviewing White Shoes, Billboard magazine found "Drivin' Wheel" to have "rockabilly treatment".

== Track listing ==
7" vinyl single

- "Drivin' Wheel" – 3:08
- "Good News" – 3:49

== Chart performance ==
Chart (1983–1984)	Peak position
Canada Country Singles (RPM)	13
US Hot Country Songs (Billboard)	26
