= Patsy Bruce =

American country songwriter (1940–2021)

- Birth name: Patsy Ann Smithson
- Born: March 8, 1940; Brownsville, Tennessee, United States
- Died: May 16, 2021 (aged 81)
- Genres: Country music
- Occupation(s): Songwriter, music manager
- Formerly of: Ed Bruce (husband: married 1964, divorced 1987); Trey Bruce (son); Bobby Borchers; Ron Peterson; Glenn Ray

Patsy Ann Bruce (née Smithson; March 8, 1940 – May 16, 2021) was an American country-western songwriter, music artist manager, and casting agent and businesswoman. She is best known for songs co-written with her then-husband, singer Ed Bruce, during the late 1970s and early 1980s, including the country-western standard "Mammas Don't Let Your Babies Grow Up to Be Cowboys", which was recorded by Waylon Jennings with Willie Nelson and went to No. 1 on the country chart in 1978.

== Biography ==
=== Early life ===
Patsy Bruce was born Patsy Ann Smithson to Henry and Hazel Smithson on March 8, 1940, in Brownsville, Tennessee.

=== Personal life and early career ===
In October 1964, while she was employed as a secretary she married William Edwin Bruce Jr., subsequently known professional as Ed Bruce, who was working as a car salesman and trying to break into music at the time. They had met in Nashville but married in Memphis before moving back to Nashville in 1966. They had a daughter in 1965, and she suffered a miscarriage in 1967, before giving birth to another daughter in 1968 and adopting a son in 1970; her husband also had a son from a previous marriage. Patsy began serving as her husband's manager, and she also began writing songs with him, and the couple established several publishing companies in Nashville.

=== Professional music career ===
In 1975, they collaborated on the song "Mammas Don't Let Your Babies Grow Up to Be Cowboys" — Patsy suggested swapping in "cowboys" for Ed's original line "Mammas Don't Let Your Babies Grow Up to Be Guitar Players." Ed Bruce's version made it to No. 15 on the Hot Country Singles charts in late 1975 and early 1976. Then, in March 1978, a Waylon Jennings/Willie Nelson cover hit No. 1 on the country music charts and spent four weeks there. A cover by Gibson/Miller Band only reached number 49, however the song became a country standard and was named one of the Top 100 Western songs of all time by members of the Western Writers of America.

The Bruces had another songwriting hit with Tanya Tucker's 1978 cover of Texas (When I Die), which Patsy co-wrote with her husband and singer Bobby Borchers. It made it to No. 5 on the Billboard Hot Country Singles chart.

=== Management and other business interests ===
She served a stint as president of the Nashville Songwriters Association International in the late 1970s and early 1980s. She and Ed also ran the Ed Bruce Talent Agency in Nashville during this period, and she worked as a casting director for the TV show Maverick and the 1980 film Urban Cowboy.

Patsy Bruce

Tennessee State Board of Probation and Parole
- In office 2004–2014

Ed and Patsy Bruce had separated in 1986, and Ed formally filed for divorce the following year. After the split, Patsy focused on the event management company "Events Unlimited". She also became involved in politics, campaigning for Phil Bredesen for governor. When he was elected, he appointed her to the Tennessee State Board of Probation and Parole in 2004, and she served on the board for 10 years. During this time, cases she voted on included those of John A. Brown, convicted of the murder of singer, musician, and Grand Ole Opry member David "Stringbean" Akeman; the Green Hills rapist; and Gaile Owens.

In 2017, she launched Songbird Tours, a songwriting-focused tour company in Nashville, with her son, the songwriter Trey Bruce.

=== Death ===
Bruce died on May 16, 2021, at age 81, of unspecified causes, just over four months after her ex-husband Ed Bruce's death on January 8, also age 81.

== Selected discography ==
Year	Artist	Album	Song	Co-written with	Notable covers
1975	Ed Bruce	Ed Bruce	"Mammas Don't Let Your Babies Grow Up to Be Cowboys"	Ed Bruce	Waylon Jennings and Willie Nelson (1978)
1978	Ed Bruce	The Tennessean	"Texas (When I Die)"	Ed Bruce, Bobby Borchers	Tanya Tucker (1978)
1980	Ed Bruce	Ed Bruce	"Girls, Women and Ladies"	Ed Bruce, Ron Peterson	
1981	Ed Bruce	One to One	"(When You Fall in Love) Everything's a Waltz"	Ed Bruce, Ron Peterson	
1982	Ed Bruce	I Write It Down	"Ever, Never Lovin' You"	Ed Bruce, Glenn Ray	
1983	Ed Bruce	You're Not Leaving Here Tonight	"After All"	Ed Bruce	
