= Ed Bruce =

American country music singer-songwriter (1939–2021)

- Born: William Edwin Bruce Jr. December 29, 1939; Keiser, Arkansas, U.S.
- Died: January 8, 2021 (aged 81) Clarksville, Tennessee, U.S.
- Genres: Outlaw country; rockabilly
- Occupations: Songwriter, singer, commercial voice-over
- Years active: 1959–2021
- Labels: Sun, RCA, United Artists, MCA, Monument, Lamon Records

William Edwin Bruce Jr. (December 29, 1939 – January 8, 2021) was an American country music songwriter, singer, and actor. He was known for writing the 1975 song "Mammas Don't Let Your Babies Grow Up to Be Cowboys" and recording the 1982 country number-one hit "You're the Best Break This Old Heart Ever Had". He also co-starred in the television series Bret Maverick with James Garner during the 1981–1982 season.

== Early life ==
Bruce was born in Keiser, Arkansas, United States, and grew up in Memphis, Tennessee. In 1957, at the age of 17, he went to see Jack Clement, a recording engineer for Sun Records. Bruce caught the attention of Sun owner Sam Phillips, for whom he wrote and recorded "Rock Boppin' Baby" (as "Edwin Bruce").

== 1960s ==
In the early 1960s, Bruce recorded for RCA and some smaller labels such as Wand/Scepter, singing rockabilly music, as well as country material and pop material such as "See the Big Man Cry". In 1962, he wrote "Save Your Kisses" for pop star Tommy Roe, and in 1963, he reached number 109 on the Billboard Bubbling Under chart with his own recording of "See the Big Man Cry" (Wand 140), both published by Bill Justis at Tuneville Music. Charlie Louvin recorded "See the Big Man Cry" (Capitol 5369) in 1965; Louvin's version reached number seven on the Billboard Country Singles chart. During his career many songs that Bruce wrote and recorded were more successful when covered by others.

In 1966, Bruce returned to RCA and recorded "Puzzles", "The Price I Pay to Stay", and "Lonesome Is Me". He scored his first charted single with "Walker's Woods" in 1967, and also charted with his version of The Monkees' "Last Train to Clarksville". Both of these singles were minor hits. In 1969, Bruce signed with Monument Records, where he continued to have minor successes with "Everybody Wants to Get to Heaven" and "Song for Jenny".

== 1970s ==
Bruce wrote "The Man That Turned My Mama On", which became a major hit for Tanya Tucker in 1974, as was his "Restless" for Crystal Gayle the same year. He signed with United Artists Records in 1973 and released several singles, but only one single in 1974 became a minor hit. Bruce finally made the top 20 on country charts with his version of "Mammas Don't Let Your Babies Grow Up to Be Cowboys", a song he wrote with then-wife Patsy Bruce, in 1976.

Two more top-40 hits followed for Bruce in 1976, and in 1977, he signed with Epic Records, where he scored minor hits. In 1978, "Mammas Don't Let Your Babies Grow up to Be Cowboys" was recorded by Willie Nelson and Waylon Jennings. It became a major hit, and continued the upward swing in Bruce's career. In 1979, Tanya Tucker took Bruce's 1977 song "Texas (When I Die)" into the country top five.

== 1980s ==
In 1980, Bruce signed with MCA Records, where he scored his biggest successes. His early hits with MCA included "Diane", "The Last Cowboy Song", "When You Fall in Love (Everything's A Waltz)", "Evil Angel", and "Love's Found You and Me". His biggest hit, "You're the Best Break This Old Heart Ever Had", went to number one on the country chart in 1982. This was also Bruce's first top-10 hit as a singer after 15 years. He had other hit songs that made the top 10, including "Ever, Never Lovin' You", "My First Taste of Texas", and "After All".

In 1984, Bruce returned to RCA Records and scored a number-three hit with "You Turn Me on Like a Radio" in 1985. His last top-10 single was "Nights" in 1986, and his last top-40 single (and last chart single to date) was "Quietly Crazy" in 1987.

== Acting ==
Bruce supplemented his songwriting income doing voice-overs for television and radio commercials. After the 1986 album entitled Night Things and a 1988 self-titled follow-up, Bruce made a conscious decision to cut back on his music to focus on his acting career, appearing in several made-for-TV films. He hosted two shows in the late 1980s, Truckin' USA and American Sports Cavalcade. He had the second lead on the television revival of 1957's Maverick, called Bret Maverick. Starring James Garner as a legendary Western gambler, the series ran on NBC-TV during the 1981–82 season. Bruce played the irascibly surly town lawman who found himself reluctantly co-owning a saloon with Maverick, with whom he seemed to maintain a surreally adversarial relationship more or less throughout the entire season. Bruce sang and wrote the theme song to the show, while Garner himself sang the same song over the end titles at the show's close, while being relentlessly interrupted by network announcements about upcoming programming.

Bruce appeared in several theatrical cinematic releases, including Fire Down Below with Steven Seagal.

== Death ==
Bruce died of natural causes in Clarksville, Tennessee, on January 8, 2021, at the age of 81.

== Posthumous album ==
An album of previously unreleased songs by Bruce, titled After Hours, was released by Music Row Talent Records on May 10, 2024, in association with Old Hat Productions. The album featured 16 tracks, 13 of which were remixes of earlier demonstration recordings. In a review, Americana Highways called the project "a touching final effort from the Arkansas-born artist/actor/songwriter." Music Row Magazine wrote that the album proves Bruce "was a songwriting master to the end."

== Honors, awards, distinctions ==
Bruce was honored with the Arkansas Country Music Award for Lifetime Achievement on June 3, 2018, at the University of Arkansas at Little Rock.
