= Steve Wariner discography =

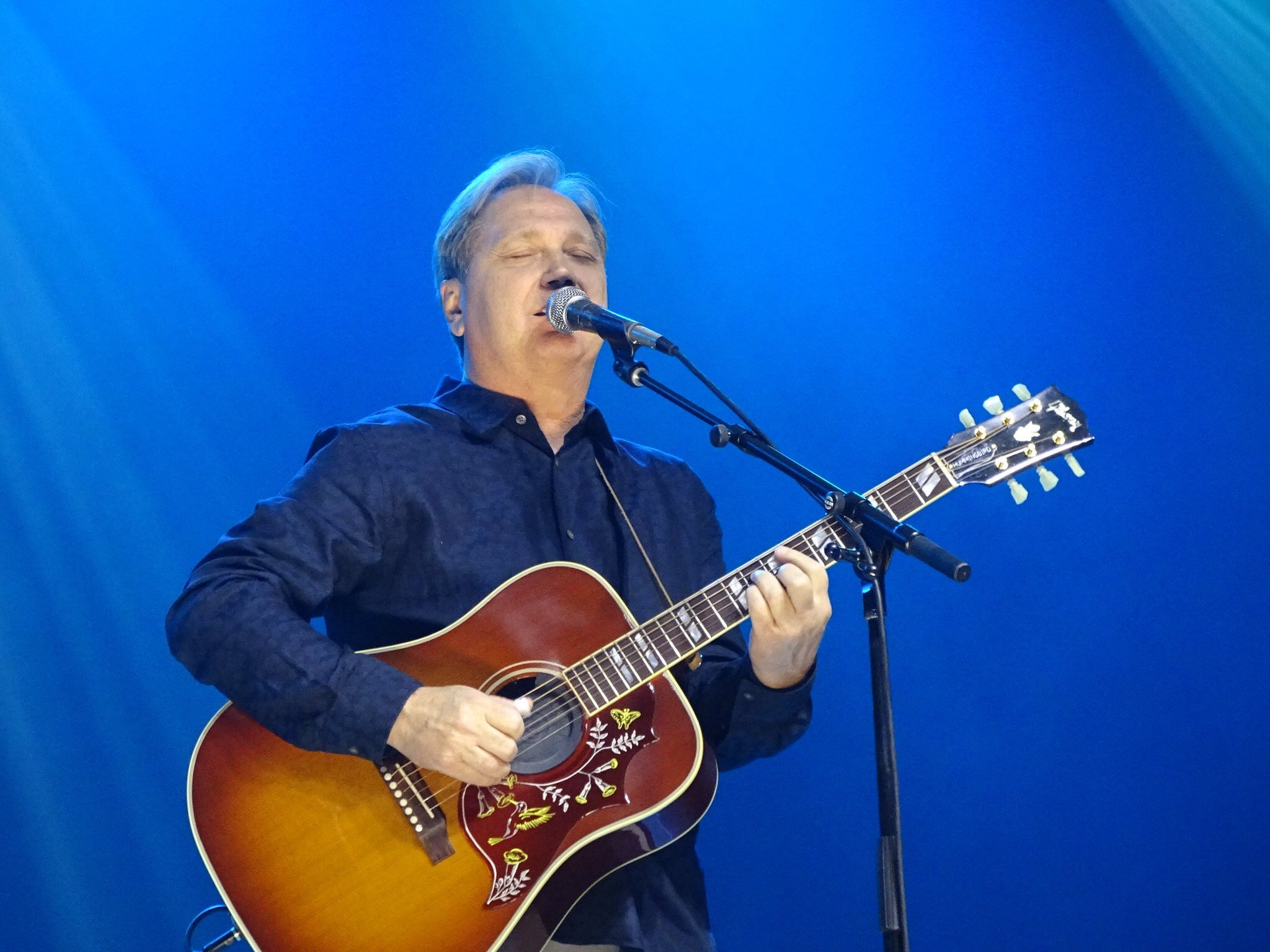
- Wariner performing in 2019.
- Studio albums: 23
- Compilation albums: 6
- Singles: 55
- Music videos: 21
- #1 Singles: 13

Steve Wariner is an American country music singer, songwriter and guitarist. His discography comprises 23 studio albums, six compilation albums and 55 singles. Of his studio albums, three are certified gold by the Recording Industry Association of America (RIAA) for shipments of 500,000 copies each: 1991's I Am Ready, and Burnin' the Roadhouse Down and Two Teardrops from 1998 and 1999 respectively. I Am Ready was Wariner's first release for Arista Nashville following tenures on RCA and MCA Nashville, and Burnin' the Roadhouse Down his first for Capitol Records.

Out of his 55 solo singles, Wariner has reached Number One on the Billboard country charts nine times. His first was "All Roads Lead to You" in 1981, followed by two streaks of three consecutive Number Ones each: "Some Fools Never Learn," "You Can Dream of Me" and "Life's Highway" between 1985 and 1986, and "Small Town Girl," "The Weekend" and "Lynda" between 1986 and 1987, followed by "Where Did I Go Wrong" and "I Got Dreams," both in 1989.

Wariner has also been featured as a guest performer on singles by Nicolette Larson, Glen Campbell, Mark O'Connor, Anita Cochran and Clint Black, and has featured Garth Brooks as a guest vocalist on two of his own singles. Wariner's guest appearance on Cochran's late 1997-early 1998 hit "What If I Said" became Wariner's tenth Number One hit, as well as his first Billboard Hot 100 hit at number 59. Although he never had any Number One country hits after this song, his singles "Two Teardrops" and "I'm Already Taken" (the latter a re-recording of his 1978 debut single, which peaked at 63 that year) reached 30 and 42 on the pop charts while also reaching Top 5 at country. Wariner's last Top Ten country hit was his guest vocal on Black's 2000 single release "Been There", a number 5 country and number 44 pop hit.

Besides his single releases and guest appearances, Wariner collaborated with Lee Roy Parnell and Diamond Rio on a rendition of "Workin' Man Blues" which reached 48 on the country charts credited to Jed Zeppelin. He has also charted with a cover version of "Get Back" from the 1995 Beatles tribute album Come Together: America Salutes The Beatles, and one Christmas release from the multi-artist Capitol Records album Shimmy Down the Chimney.

== Studio albums ==
=== 1980s ===
Title	Album details	Peak positions
Title	Album details	US Country
Steve Wariner	Release date: 1982; Label: RCA Records; Formats: LP, cassette	35
Midnight Fire	Release date: 1983; Label: RCA Records; Formats: LP, cassette	39
One Good Night Deserves Another	Release date: 1985; Label: MCA Records; Formats: LP, CD, cassette	20
Life's Highway	Release date: 1985; Label: MCA Records; Formats: LP, CD, cassette	22
It's a Crazy World	Release date: 1987; Label: MCA Records; Formats: LP, CD, cassette	30
I Should Be with You	Release date: March 7, 1988; Label: MCA Records; Formats: LP, CD, cassette	20
I Got Dreams	Release date: 1989; Label: MCA Records; Formats: LP, CD, cassette	32
"—" denotes releases that did not chart

=== 1990s ===
Title	Album details	Peak chart positions			Certifications (sales threshold)
Title	Album details	US Country	US	CAN Country	Certifications (sales threshold)
Laredo	Release date: February 28, 1990; Label: MCA Records; Formats: CD, cassette	20	—	—	
Christmas Memories	Release date: October 16, 1990; Label: MCA Records; Formats: CD, cassette	71	—	—	
I Am Ready	Release date: October 22, 1991; Label: Arista Nashville; Formats: CD, cassette	28	180	16	US: Gold
Drive	Release date: July 27, 1993; Label: Arista Nashville; Formats: CD, cassette	51	—	19	
No More Mr. Nice Guy	Release date: March 12, 1996; Label: Arista Nashville; Formats: CD, cassette	—	—	—	
Burnin' the Roadhouse Down	Release date: April 21, 1998; Label: Capitol Nashville; Formats: CD, cassette	6	41	15	US: Gold
Two Teardrops	Release date: May 4, 1999; Label: Capitol Nashville; Formats: CD, cassette	6	35	6	US: Gold
"—" denotes releases that did not chart

=== 2000s ===
Title	Album details	Peak chart positions	
Title	Album details	US Country	US Indie
Faith in You	Release date: May 9, 2000; Label: Capitol Nashville; Formats: CD, cassette	31	—
Steal Another Day	Release date: February 4, 2003; Label: SelecTone Records; Formats: CD	31	12
Guitar Christmas	Release date: October 20, 2003; Re-release: October 12, 2010; Label: SelecTone Records, Allegro Media Group (re-release); Formats: CD, digital download	—	—
This Real Life	Release date: August 9, 2005; Label: SelecTone Records; Formats: CD, music download	—	—
My Tribute to Chet Atkins	Release date: June 23, 2009; Label: SelecTone Records; Formats: CD, music download	—	—
"—" denotes releases that did not chart

=== 2010s and 2020s ===
Title	Album details	Peak positions
Title	Album details	US Country
Guitar Laboratory	Release date: February 8, 2011; Label: SelecTone Records; Formats: CD, music download	—
It Ain't All Bad	Release date: September 10, 2013; Label: SelecTone Records; Formats: CD, music download	74
All Over the Map	Release date: October 28, 2016; Label: SelecTone Records; Formats: CD, music download	—
Feels Like Christmas Time	Release date: October 15, 2021; Label: SelecTone Records; Formats: CD, digital download; Wariner's third Christmas album contains six original songs co-written by Wariner and five holiday standards	—
"—" denotes releases that did not chart

== Compilation albums ==
Title	Album details	Peak chart positions	
Title	Album details	US Country	US
Greatest Hits	Release date: 1985; Label: RCA Records; Formats: LP, CD, cassette	—	—
Down in Tennessee	Release date: 1986; Label: RCA Records; Formats: LP, cassette	—	—
Greatest Hits	Release date: September 7, 1987; Label: MCA Records; Formats: LP, CD, cassette	25	187
Greatest Hits Volume II	Release date: October 25, 1990; Label: MCA Records; Formats: CD, cassette	—	—
"—" denotes releases that did not chart

== Singles ==
=== 1970s and 1980s ===
Year	Single	Peak chart positions		Album
Year	Single	US Country	CAN Country	Album
1978	"I'm Already Taken"	63	—	Non-album singles
1978	"So Sad (To Watch Good Love Go Bad)"	76	—	Non-album singles
1978	"Marie"	94	—	Non-album singles
1979	"Beside Me"	60	—	Non-album singles
1980	"The Easy Part's Over"	41	—	Non-album singles
1980	"Your Memory"	7	—	Steve Wariner
1981	"By Now"	6	50	Steve Wariner
1981	"All Roads Lead to You" (Note: "All Roads Lead to You" also peaked at number 7 on the Bubbling Under Hot 100 Singles chart, which acts as a 25-song extension of the Billboard Hot 100.)	1	19	Steve Wariner
1982	"Kansas City Lights"	15	—	Steve Wariner
1982	"Don't It Break Your Heart"	30	—	Steve Wariner
1982	"Don't Plan On Sleeping Tonight"	27	34	Steve Wariner
1983	"Don't Your Mem'ry Ever Sleep at Night"	23	26	Midnight Fire
1983	"Midnight Fire"	5	11	Midnight Fire
1983	"Lonely Women Make Good Lovers"	4	3	Midnight Fire
1984	"Why Goodbye"	12	16	Midnight Fire
1984	"Don't You Give Up on Love"	49	46	Midnight Fire
1984	"What I Didn't Do"	3	1	One Good Night Deserves Another
1985	"Heart Trouble"	8	15	One Good Night Deserves Another
1985	"Some Fools Never Learn"	1	1	One Good Night Deserves Another
1985	"You Can Dream of Me"	1	1	Life's Highway
1986	"Life's Highway"	1	2	Life's Highway
1986	"Starting Over Again"	4	11	Life's Highway
1986	"Small Town Girl"	1	1	It's a Crazy World
1987	"The Weekend"	1	1	It's a Crazy World
1987	"Lynda"	1	1	It's a Crazy World
1988	"Baby I'm Yours"	2	1	I Should Be with You
1988	"I Should Be with You" (Note: "I Should Be with You" also peaked at number 43 on the Hot Adult Contemporary Tracks chart.)	2	1	I Should Be with You
1988	"Hold On (A Little Longer)"	6	4	I Should Be with You
1989	"Where Did I Go Wrong"	1	1	I Got Dreams
1989	"I Got Dreams"	1	3	I Got Dreams
1989	"When I Could Come Home to You"	5	10	I Got Dreams
"—" denotes releases that did not chart

=== 1990s and 2000s ===
Year	Single	Peak chart positions			Album
Year	Single	US Country	US	CAN Country	Album
1990	"The Domino Theory"	7	—	3	Laredo
1990	"Precious Thing"	8	—	13	Laredo
1990	"There for Awhile"	17	—	16	Laredo
1991	"Leave Him Out of This"	6	—	11	I Am Ready
1992	"The Tips of My Fingers"	3	—	19	I Am Ready
1992	"A Woman Loves"	9	—	12	I Am Ready
1992	"Crash Course in the Blues"	32	—	45	I Am Ready
1993	"Like a River to the Sea"	30	—	12	I Am Ready
1993	"If I Didn't Love You"	8	—	8	Drive
1993	"Drivin' and Cryin'"	24	—	65	Drive
1994	"It Won't Be Over You"	18	—	—	Drive
1994	"Drive"	63	—	—	Drive
1995	"Get Back"	72	—	—	Come Together: America Salutes The Beatles
1998	"Holes in the Floor of Heaven"	2	—	2	Burnin' the Roadhouse Down
1998	"Road Trippin'"	55	—	56	Burnin' the Roadhouse Down
1998	"Burnin' the Roadhouse Down" (with Garth Brooks)	26	—	14	Burnin' the Roadhouse Down
1998	"Every Little Whisper"	36	—	48	Burnin' the Roadhouse Down
1999	"Two Teardrops"	2	30	5	Two Teardrops
1999	"I'm Already Taken" (re-recording)	3	42	10	Two Teardrops
2000	"Faith in You"	28	—	60	Faith in You
2000	"Katie Wants a Fast One" (with Garth Brooks)	22	— (Note: "Katie Wants a Fast One" did not enter the Hot 100, but peaked at number 9 on Bubbling Under Hot 100 Singles, which acts as a 25-song extension of the Hot 100.)	10	Faith in You
2003	"Snowfall on the Sand"	52	—	—	Steal Another Day
2003	"I'm Your Man"	58	—	—	Steal Another Day
"—" denotes releases that did not chart

=== As a featured artist ===
Year	Single	Peak chart positions			Album
Year	Single	US Country	US	CAN Country	Album
1986	"That's How You Know When Love's Right" (Nicolette Larson with Steve Wariner)	9	—	9	Rose of My Heart
1987	"The Hand That Rocks the Cradle" (Glen Campbell with Steve Wariner)	6	—	6	Still Within the Sound of My Voice
1991	"Restless" (Mark O'Connor with Vince Gill, Ricky Skaggs, and Steve Wariner)	25	—	19	The New Nashville Cats
1991	"Now It Belongs to You" (Mark O'Connor with Steve Wariner)	71	—	62	The New Nashville Cats
1994	"Workin' Man's Blues" (as Jed Zeppelin) (Note: Jed Zeppelin is a multi-artist collaboration consisting of Diamond Rio, Lee Roy Parnell, and Steve Wariner.)	48	—	—	Mama's Hungry Eyes: A Tribute to Merle Haggard
1997	"What If I Said" (Anita Cochran with Steve Wariner)	1	59	1	Back to You
2000	"Been There" (Clint Black with Steve Wariner)	5	44	1	D'lectrified
"—" denotes releases that did not chart

=== Christmas singles ===
Year	Single	Peak positions	Album
Year	Single	US Country	Album
2000	"Christmas in Your Arms"	65	Shimmy Down the Chimney: A Country Christmas

=== Promotional singles ===
Year	Single	Album
1985	"When We're Together"	Greatest Hits (RCA)
1986	"You Make It Feel So Right"	Down in Tennessee

== Charted B-sides ==
Year	B-side	Peak positions	Original A-side
Year	B-side	US Country	Original A-side
1979	"Forget Me Not"	49	"Beside Me"

== Music videos ==
Year	Video	Director
1984	"Why Goodbye"	Hogan Entertainment
1987	"The Weekend"	Michael Salomon
1988	"I Should Be with You"	Michael Salomon
1990	"The Domino Theory"	Jerry Simer
1991	"Leave Him Out of This"	Michael Merriman
1992	"The Tips of My Fingers"	Deaton-Flanigen Productions
1992	"Crash Course in the Blues"	Julie Cypher
1993	"If I Didn't Love You"	Deaton-Flanigen Productions
1993	"Drivin' and Cryin'"	Deaton-Flanigen Productions
1994	"Drive"	Deaton-Flanigen Productions
1995	"Get Back"	Brent Hedgecock
1998	"Holes in the Floor of Heaven"	Michael Salomon
1999	"Two Teardrops"	Charley Randazzo
1999	"I'm Already Taken"	Charley Randazzo
2000	"Faith in You"	Peter Zavadil

=== Guest appearances ===
Year	Video	Director
1991	"Restless" (with Mark O'Connor, Vince Gill and Ricky Skaggs)	
1991	"Now It Belongs to You" (with Mark O'Connor)	Gustavo Garzon
1994	"Workin' Man Blues" (with Diamond Rio and Lee Roy Parnell; credited as Jed Zeppelin)	Deaton Flanigen
1997	"This Night Won't Last Forever" (with Sawyer Brown and Mac McAnally) (Live)	Michael Salomon
1997	"What If I Said" (with Anita Cochran)	Jim Shea
2000	"Been There" (with Clint Black)	Clint Black
