= 1987 in country music =

This is a list of notable events in country music that took place in the year 1987.

== Events ==
- June 13 — Randy Travis' "Forever and Ever, Amen" spends three weeks at No. 1 on the Billboard Hot Country Singles chart. It is the first multi-week chart-topping song since "Lost in the Fifties Tonight (In the Still of the Night)" by Ronnie Milsap spent two weeks atop the chart in September 1985; in that time span, 85 other songs had been No. 1. Only three other songs during the 1980s — all of them in 1980 — would spend more than two weeks at No. 1, owing much to how Billboard compiled the chart data at the time.
- June 27- Pee Wee King Celebrates is 50th Grand ole opry anniversary
- September — Dolly Parton's TV variety series, Dolly, premieres on ABC in September. Despite strong ratings in its early weeks, the show was panned by critics and viewership declined. The series was cancelled at the end of the 1987–1988 season.

=== No dates ===
- 46-year-old singer-songwriter K.T. Oslin becomes the success story of the year with her hit "80s Ladies", a Grammy Award-winner which tells the story of three childhood friends who stay together through an era of social change. The song spawns an award-winning video and, despite only reaching No. 7 on the Hot Country Singles chart, was one of the most played songs of the year. Oslin's rise to fame in her mid-40s came at a time when mainstream country radio was beginning to shun older female artists for younger, more attractive stars.

== Top hits of the year ==
=== Singles released by American artists ===
US	CAN	Single	Artist
7	4	80's Ladies	K. T. Oslin
86	17	Ain't No Cure for Love	Jennifer Warnes
1	1	All My Ex's Live in Texas	George Strait
1	1	Am I Blue	George Strait
16	35	American Me	S-K-O
4	—	Another World	Crystal Gayle and Gary Morris
2	2	Baby's Got a Hold on Me	Nitty Gritty Dirt Band
1	—	Baby's Got a New Baby	S-K-O
4	8	The Bed You Made for Me	Highway 101
10	9	Bonnie Jean (Little Sister)	David Lynn Jones
1	1	Born to Boogie	Hank Williams, Jr.
9	4	Brilliant Conversationalist	T. Graham Brown
1	1	Can't Stop My Heart from Loving You	The O'Kanes
6	1	The Carpenter	John Conlee
4	7	Chains of Gold	Sweethearts of the Rodeo
16	30	Changin' Partners	Larry Gatlin & the Gatlin Brothers
13	14	Child Support	Barbara Mandrell
5	3	Cinderella	Vince Gill
10	23	Cowboy Man	Lyle Lovett
3	7	Crazy from the Heart	The Bellamy Brothers
4	—	Crazy Over You	Foster & Lloyd
7	5	Crime of Passion	Ricky Van Shelton
1	2	Cry Myself to Sleep	The Judds
9	12	Daddies Need to Grow Up Too	The O'Kanes
10	10	Deep River Woman	Lionel Richie with Alabama
85	17	Didn't You Go and Leave Me	Rosemary Sharp
1	3	Do Ya	K. T. Oslin
4	5	Domestic Life	John Conlee
10	4	Don't Be Cruel	The Judds
1	1	Don't Go to Strangers	T. Graham Brown
20	19	Don't Touch Me There	Charly McClain
4	7	A Face in the Crowd	Michael Martin Murphey and Holly Dunn
2	2	Fallin' for You for Years	Conway Twitty
8	11	Fallin' Out	Waylon Jennings
7	5	Fire in the Sky	Nitty Gritty Dirt Band
1	1	Fishin' in the Dark	Nitty Gritty Dirt Band
7	11	Forever	The Statler Brothers
1	1	Forever and Ever, Amen	Randy Travis
16	18	Full Grown Fool	Mickey Gilley
7	10	Girls Ride Horses Too	Judy Rodman
13	18	Give Back My Heart	Lyle Lovett
1	3	Give Me Wings	Michael Johnson
18	23	God Will	Lyle Lovett
8	10	Goodbye's All We've Got Left	Steve Earle
10	11	Gotta Get Away	Sweethearts of the Rodeo
9	6	Gotta Have You	Eddie Rabbitt
2	3	Half Past Forever (Till I'm Blue in the Heart)	T. G. Sheppard
6	6	The Hand That Rocks the Cradle	Glen Campbell (with Steve Wariner)
10	—	Hard Livin'	Keith Whitley
14	50	Have I Got Some Blues for You	Charley Pride
18	39	He's Letting Go	Baillie & the Boys
9	25	Homecoming '63	Keith Whitley
17	12	House of Blue Lights	Asleep at the Wheel
1	1	How Do I Turn You On	Ronnie Milsap
1	3	I Can't Win for Losin' You	Earl Thomas Conley
1	1	I Know Where I'm Going	The Judds
14	19	I Only Wanted You	Marie Osmond
2	2	I Prefer the Moonlight	Kenny Rogers
2	2	I Want to Know You Before We Make Love	Conway Twitty
1	1	I Will Be There	Dan Seals
1	1	I Won't Need You Anymore (Always and Forever)	Randy Travis
10	24	I'll Be the One	The Statler Brothers
5	9	I'll Be Your Baby Tonight	Judy Rodman
2	1	I'll Come Back as Another Woman	Tanya Tucker
4	15	I'll Never Be in Love Again	Don Williams
1	1	I'll Still Be Loving You	Restless Heart
9	24	If There's Any Justice	Lee Greenwood
1	1	It Takes a Little Rain (To Make Love Grow)	The Oak Ridge Boys
31	7	It Won't Hurt	Dwight Yoakam
8	12	It's Only Over for You	Tanya Tucker
2	3	Julia	Conway Twitty
1	3	Kids of the Baby Boom	The Bellamy Brothers
37	20	Killbilly Hill	Southern Pacific
1	2	The Last One to Know	Reba McEntire
1	1	Leave Me Lonely	Gary Morris
4	5	Let the Music Lift You Up	Reba McEntire
16	17	Let's Do Something	Vince Gill
7	3	Little Sister	Dwight Yoakam
8	1	Little Ways	Dwight Yoakam
1	1	A Long Line of Love	Michael Martin Murphey
10	7	Love Can't Ever Get Better Than This	Ricky Skaggs & Sharon White
2	3	Love Me Like You Used To	Tanya Tucker
6	5	Love Reunited	The Desert Rose Band
2	2	Love Someone Like Me	Holly Dunn
6	4	Love, You Ain't Seen the Last of Me	John Schneider
1	1	Lynda	Steve Wariner
1	1	Make No Mistake, She's Mine	Kenny Rogers and Ronnie Milsap
11	7	Mama's Rockin' Chair	John Conlee
1	1	Maybe Your Baby's Got the Blues	The Judds
4	6	Midnight Girl/Sunset Town	Sweethearts of the Rodeo
1	2	The Moon Is Still Over Her Shoulder	Michael Johnson
1	1	Mornin' Ride	Lee Greenwood
19	37	No Easy Horses	S-K-B
2	1	No Place Like Home	Randy Travis
20	7	Nowhere Road	Steve Earle
1	1	Ocean Front Property	George Strait
9	17	Oh Heart	Baillie & the Boys
11	—	Old Bridges Burn Slow	Billy Joe Royal
2	2	One for the Money	T. G. Sheppard
1	1	One Promise Too Late	Reba McEntire
4	7	Only When I Love	Holly Dunn
9	9	Plain Brown Wrapper	Gary Morris
76	17	Real Good Heartache	Rosemary Sharp
1	1	Right from the Start	Earl Thomas Conley
3	5	Right Hand Man	Eddy Raven
8	6	The Right Left Hand	George Jones
16	14	The Rock and Roll of Love	Tom Wopat
1	1	Rose in Paradise	Waylon Jennings
6	18	Rough and Rowdy Days	Waylon Jennings
9	12	Señorita	Don Williams
4	3	She Couldn't Love Me Anymore	T. Graham Brown
9	—	She Thinks That She'll Marry	Judy Rodman
1	1	She's Too Good to Be True	Exile
1	1	Shine, Shine, Shine	Eddy Raven
1	1	Small Town Girl	Steve Wariner
1	1	Snap Your Fingers	Ronnie Milsap
1	5	Somebody Lied	Ricky Van Shelton
5	3	Someone	Lee Greenwood
1	1	Somewhere Tonight	Highway 101
1	2	Straight to the Heart	Crystal Gayle
20	—	Susannah	Tom Wopat
37	19	Sweet Little '66	Steve Earle
10	7	Take the Long Way Home	John Schneider
4	3	Talkin' to the Moon	Larry Gatlin & the Gatlin Brothers
7	4	Tar Top	Alabama
3	6	Telling Me Lies	Dolly Parton, Linda Ronstadt, Emmylou Harris
1	2	That Was a Close One	Earl Thomas Conley
3	4	Then It's Love	Don Williams
1	2	This Crazy Love	The Oak Ridge Boys
5	1	Those Memories of You	Dolly Parton, Linda Ronstadt, Emmylou Harris
1	1	Three Time Loser	Dan Seals
6	10	Till I'm Too Old to Die Young	Moe Bandy
17	35	Time In	The Oak Ridge Boys
1	1	To Know Him Is to Love Him	Dolly Parton, Linda Ronstadt, Emmylou Harris
5	4	Too Many Rivers	The Forester Sisters
6	15	Train of Memories	Kathy Mattea
2	2	Twenty Years Ago	Kenny Rogers
1	1	The Way We Make a Broken Heart	Rosanne Cash
1	1	The Weekend	Steve Wariner
1	1	What Am I Gonna Do About You	Reba McEntire
9	7	What Can I Do with My Heart	Juice Newton
20	10	When a Woman Cries	Janie Fricke
2	1	Whiskey, If You Were a Woman	Highway 101
1	1	Why Does It Have to Be (Wrong or Right)	Restless Heart
15	24	Why I Don't Know	Lyle Lovett
1	3	You Again	The Forester Sisters
11	—	You Haven't Heard the Last of Me	Moe Bandy
1	1	You Still Move Me	Dan Seals
2	5	You're My First Lady	T. G. Sheppard
3	6	You're Never Too Old for Young Love	Eddy Raven
5	—	You're the Power	Kathy Mattea
1	1	"You've Got" the Touch	Alabama
12	13	Your Love	Tammy Wynette

=== Singles released by Canadian artists ===
US	CAN	Single	Artist
—	8	All I Really Need	Audie Henry
20	10	Are You Still in Love with Me	Anne Murray
—	6	Arms That Love (Hearts That Don't)	Carroll Baker
—	19	Better Off Alone	The Good Brothers
—	9	Cowboy Pride	Ian Tyson
—	10	Death and Taxes and Me Lovin' You	Carroll Baker
—	15	Denim Blue Eyes	Sylvia Tyson
—	14	Diamonds in the Dark	Cameron Molloy with Silver Weasel
—	9	Heroes	Mercey Brothers
—	10	I Love You More	Family Brown
—	20	I've Found Someone Too	Anita Perras
—	16	Listen to My Heart	Stoker Bros
—	11	New Fool at an Old Game	Michelle Wright
—	9	No Holiday in L.A.	Ronnie Prophet
—	13	None of the Feeling Is Gone	Terry Carisse with Michelle Wright
—	3	Old Photographs	Terry Carisse
—	8	Raised by the Radio	Mercey Brothers
84	11	Roller Coaster	Alibi
—	13	Say When	Tim Taylor
—	14	Small Talk	Glory-Anne Carriere
—	10	Starting Forever Again	Terry Carisse
—	15	Taste of Romance	Bootleg
—	20	Too Short a Ride	Sylvia Tyson
—	14	True Blue	Anne Lord
—	1	Try	Blue Rodeo
—	10	Walk in the Rain Tonight	Gary Fjellgaard
—	20	What a Fool I'd Be	Colleen Peterson

== Top new album releases ==
US	Album	Artist	Record label
16	10	Asleep at the Wheel	Epic
14	20 Greatest Hits	Don Williams	MCA
1	80's Ladies	K. T. Oslin	RCA
18	After All This Time	Charley Pride	16th Avenue
1	Always & Forever	Randy Travis	Warner Bros.
16	American Faces	John Conlee	Columbia
23	Angel Band	Emmylou Harris	Warner Bros.
7	The Best	Dan Seals	Capitol
25	Borderline	Conway Twitty	MCA
1	Born to Boogie	Hank Williams, Jr.	Curb/Warner Bros.
23	Brilliant Conversationalist	T. Graham Brown	Capitol
8	Chill Factor	Merle Haggard	Epic
17	Come On Joe	Jo-El Sonnier	RCA
22	Cornerstone	Holly Dunn	MTM
21	Country Rap	The Bellamy Brothers	Curb/MCA
25	Crackin' Up	Ray Stevens	MCA
24	The Desert Rose Band	The Desert Rose Band	Curb/MCA
15	Exit 0	Steve Earle & The Dukes	MCA
2	Greatest Hits	Reba McEntire	MCA
22	Greatest Hits	John Schneider	MCA
25	Greatest Hits	Steve Wariner	MCA
1	Greatest Hits Volume Two	George Strait	MCA
19	Hangin' Tough	Waylon Jennings	MCA
1	Hank Live	Hank Williams, Jr.	Curb/Warner Bros.
9	Harmony	Anne Murray	Capitol
13	Heart and Soul	Ronnie Milsap	RCA
20	Heartbeat	The Oak Ridge Boys	MCA
1	Heartland	The Judds	Curb/RCA
7	Highway 101	Highway 101	Warner Bros.
1	Hillbilly Deluxe	Dwight Yoakam	Reprise
24	Hits	Gary Morris	Warner Bros.
14	Hold On	Nitty Gritty Dirt Band	Warner Bros.
18	I Prefer the Moonlight	Kenny Rogers	RCA
14	Island in the Sea	Willie Nelson	Columbia
1	Just Us	Alabama	RCA
6	King's Record Shop	Rosanne Cash	Columbia
3	The Last One to Know	Reba McEntire	MCA
23	Lone Star State of Mind	Nanci Griffith	MCA
10	Love Me Like You Used To	Tanya Tucker	Capitol
22	A Man Called Hoss	Waylon Jennings	MCA
9	Maple Street Memories	The Statler Brothers	Mercury
1	Ocean Front Property	George Strait	MCA
18	Rainbow	Dolly Parton	Columbia
18	Right Hand Man	Eddy Raven	RCA
5	The Royal Treatment	Billy Joe Royal	Atlantic
13	Shelter from the Night	Exile	Epic
16	Somewhere in the Night	Sawyer Brown	Capitol/Curb
24	Sure Feels Good	Barbara Mandrell	EMI America
14	Too Wild Too Long	George Jones	Epic
1	Trio	Dolly Parton, Linda Ronstadt & Emmylou Harris	Warner Bros.
11	Untasted Honey	Kathy Mattea	Mercury
13	The Way Back Home	Vince Gill	RCA
25	What If We Fall in Love?	Crystal Gayle & Gary Morris	Warner Bros.
14	Where the Fast Lane Ends	The Oak Ridge Boys	MCA
1	Wild-Eyed Dream	Ricky Van Shelton	Columbia
13	You Again	The Forester Sisters	Warner Bros.
10	You Haven't Heard the Last of Me	Moe Bandy	Curb

=== Other top albums ===
US	Album	Artist	Record label
29	After Midnight	Janie Frickie	Columbia
37	Ain't No Binds	The Whites	MCA
32	Americana	Michael Martin Murphey	Warner Bros.
56	Angel with a Lariat	k.d. lang	Sire
48	Back to Basics	Mickey Gilley	Epic
27	Baillie & the Boys	Baillie & the Boys	RCA
53	The Best of Crystal Gayle	Crystal Gayle	Warner Bros.
41	Blue Skies Again	John Anderson	MCA
51	Break the Routine	The Kendalls	Step One
63	Celebration	Janie Frickie	Columbia
66	A Christmas Card	The Forester Sisters	Warner Bros.
57	A Christmas Tradition	Various Artists	Warner Bros.
49	Christmas Time with The Judds	The Judds	Curb/RCA
47	Country Collection	Various Artists	K-Tel
48	Country Now	Various Artists	K-Tel
50	Crazy from the Heart	The Bellamy Brothers	Curb/MCA
69	A Crystal Christmas	Crystal Gayle	Warner Bros.
59	Emotion	Juice Newton	RCA
33	Foster & Lloyd	Foster & Lloyd	RCA
43	Greatest Hits	Mel McDaniel	Capitol
59	Greatest Hits	Sylvia	RCA
41	Greatest Hits, Vol. 1	Ray Stevens	MCA
62	Greatest Hits, Vol. 2	Ray Stevens	MCA
28	Hard Times on Easy Street	David Lynn Jones	Mercury
43	Higher Ground	Tammy Wynette	Epic
54	Honky Tonk Crazy	Gene Watson	Epic
38	If There's Any Justice	Lee Greenwood	MCA
29	It's a Crazy World	Steve Wariner	MCA
36	Johnny Cash Is Coming to Town	Johnny Cash	Mercury/PolyGram
54	Larry Boone	Larry Boone	Mercury
63	The Lonesome Jubilee	John Mellencamp	Mercury
50	A Matter of Life... and Death	David Allan Coe	Columbia
72	Merry Christmas to You	Reba McEntire	MCA
54	Modern Times	Johnny Paycheck	Mercury/PolyGram
52	No Easy Horses	S-K-B	MTM
47	One for the Money	T. G. Sheppard	Columbia
55	The Only One	O. B. McClinton	Epic
71	The Patsy Cline Story	Patsy Cline	MCA
29	A Place Called Love	Judy Rodman	MTM
49	Rattlesnake Annie	Rattlesnake Annie	Columbia
60	Romeo's Escape	Dave Alvin	Epic
65	Rosie Flores	Rosie Flores	Reprise
31	Seashores of Old Mexico	Merle Haggard & Willie Nelson	Epic
35	Still I Stay	Charly McClain	Epic
32	Still within the Sound of My Voice	Glen Campbell	MCA
26	Super Hits	George Jones	Epic
39	Walking the Line	Merle Haggard, George Jones & Willie Nelson	Epic
42	What a Girl Next Door Could Do	Girls Next Door	MTM
41	You Ain't Seen the Last of Me	John Schneider	MCA

== On television ==
=== Regular series ===
- Dolly (1987–1988, ABC)
- Hee Haw (1969–1993, syndicated)

== Births ==
- January 31 – Tyler Hubbard, member of Florida Georgia Line, a duo of the 2010s.
- May 7 – Russell Dickerson, country performer of the 2010s onward.
- May 21 – Cody Johnson, Texas country singer-songwriter of the 2010s onward ("'Til You Can't").
- August 16 – Dan Smyers, member of Dan + Shay, a rising duo of the 2010s.
- September 25 — Greg Bates, up-and-coming country singer of the early 2010s.
- October 17 – Jameson Rodgers, up-and-coming country singer-songwriter of the early 2020s.

== Deaths ==
- June 25 – Boudleaux Bryant, 67, songwriter (with wife Felice) of many 1950s and 1960s hits.

== Hall of Fame inductees ==
=== Country Music Hall of Fame inductees ===
- Rod Brasfield (1910–1958)

=== Canadian Country Music Hall of Fame inductees ===
- Lucille Starr

== Major awards ==
=== Grammy Awards ===
- Best Female Country Vocal Performance — "80's Ladies", K. T. Oslin
- Best Male Country Vocal Performance — Always & Forever, Randy Travis
- Best Country Performance by a Duo or Group with Vocal — Trio, Dolly Parton, Linda Ronstadt and Emmylou Harris
- Best Country Collaboration with Vocals — "Make No Mistake, She's Mine," Ronnie Milsap and Kenny Rogers
- Best Country Instrumental Performance — "String of Pars," Asleep at the Wheel
- Best Country Song — "Forever and Ever, Amen," Paul Overstreet and Don Schlitz (Performer: Randy Travis)

=== Juno Awards ===
- Country Male Vocalist of the Year — Ian Tyson
- Country Female Vocalist of the Year — k.d. lang
- Country Group or Duo of the Year — Prairie Oyster

=== Academy of Country Music ===
- Entertainer of the Year — Hank Williams, Jr.
- Song of the Year — "Forever and Ever, Amen," Paul Overstreet and Don Schlitz (Performer: Randy Travis)
- Single of the Year — "Forever and Ever, Amen," Randy Travis
- Album of the Year — Trio, Emmylou Harris, Dolly Parton, and Linda Ronstadt
- Top Male Vocalist — Randy Travis
- Top Female Vocalist — Reba McEntire
- Top Vocal Duo — The Judds
- Top Vocal Group — Highway 101
- Top New Male Vocalist — Ricky Van Shelton
- Top New Female Vocalist — K. T. Oslin
- Video of the Year — "80's Ladies", K. T. Oslin (Director: Jack Cole)

=== ARIA Awards ===
(presented in Sydney on March 2, 1987)

- Best Country Album - Mallee Boy (John Williamson)

=== Canadian Country Music Association ===
- Entertainer of the Year — k.d. lang
- Male Artist of the Year — Ian Tyson
- Female Artist of the Year — Anita Perras
- Group of the Year — Family Brown
- SOCAN Song of the Year — "Heroes" Gary Fjellgaard (Performer: Mercey Brothers)
- Single of the Year — "Navajo Rug", Ian Tyson
- Album of the Year — Cowboyography, Ian Tyson
- Top Selling Album — Storms of Life, Randy Travis
- Vista Rising Star Award — k.d. lang
- Duo of the Year — Anita Perras and Tim Taylor

=== Country Music Association ===
- Entertainer of the Year — Hank Williams, Jr.
- Song of the Year — "Forever and Ever, Amen," Paul Overstreet and Don Schlitz (Performer: Randy Travis)
- Single of the Year — "Forever and Ever, Amen," Randy Travis
- Album of the Year — Always & Forever, Randy Travis
- Male Vocalist of the Year — Randy Travis
- Female Vocalist of the Year — Reba McEntire
- Vocal Duo of the Year — Ricky Skaggs and Sharon White
- Vocal Group of the Year — The Judds
- Horizon Award — Holly Dunn
- Music Video of the Year — "My Name Is Bocephus," Hank Williams, Jr. (Directors: Bill Fishman and Preacher Ewing)
- Instrumentalist of the Year — Johnny Gimble

== Other links ==
- Country Music Association
- Inductees of the Country Music Hall of Fame
