= Greatest Hits (1987 Steve Wariner album) =

Greatest hits album by Steve Wariner
- Released: September 7, 1987
- Genre: Country
- Length: 36:30
- Label: MCA
- Producer: Tony Brown, Jimmy Bowen, Emory Gordy Jr.

Steve Wariner chronology
It's a Crazy World (1987)	Greatest Hits (1987)	I Should Be with You (1988)

Greatest Hits is the second compilation album by American country music artist Steve Wariner. It was released on September 7, 1987 via MCA Records.

== Track listing ==
No.	Title	Writer(s)	Length
1.	"What I Didn't Do"	Wood Newton, Michael Noble	3:09
2.	"Heart Trouble"	Dave Gibson, Kent Robbins	3:30
3.	"Some Fools Never Learn"	John Scott Sherrill	4:06
4.	"You Can Dream of Me"	Steve Wariner, John Hall	4:04
5.	"Life's Highway"	Richard Leigh, Roger Murrah	3:17
6.	"That's How You Know When Love's Right" (duet with Nicolette Larson)	Craig Bickhardt, Wendy Waldman	3:26
7.	"Starting Over Again"	John Wesley Ryles, Don Goodman	4:19
8.	"Small Town Girl"	John Barlow Jarvis, Don Cook	3:46
9.	"The Weekend"	Bill LaBounty, Beckie Foster	3:50
10.	"Lynda"	LaBounty, Pat McLaughlin	3:08

== Chart performance ==
Chart (1987)	Peak position
US Billboard 200	187
US Top Country Albums (Billboard)	25
