= Steal Another Day =

Studio album by Steve Wariner
- Released: February 4, 2003
- Studio: Wariner's Studio (Franklin, Tennessee); The Tracking Room and Emerald Studios (Nashville, Tennessee)
- Genre: Country
- Length: 62:48
- Label: SelecTone Records
- Producer: Steve Wariner

Steve Wariner chronology
Faith in You (2000)	Steal Another Day (2003)	This Real Life (2005)

Singles from Steve Wariner
- 1. "I'm Your Man" Released: 2003; 2. "Snowfall on the Sand" Released: 2003

Professional ratings
Review scores
Source	Rating
Allmusic	4.5/5 stars

Steal Another Day is an album released in 2003 by country music artist Steve Wariner and his first studio album for SelecTone Records. The album produced two singles on the Billboard Hot Country Singles chart "I'm Your Man" and "Snowfall on the Sand" which reached 58 and 52 respectively.

== Track listing ==
No.	Title	Writer(s)	Length
1.	"Kiss Me Anyway"	Billy Kirsch, Steve Wariner	4:13
2.	"Carmelita"	Lee Roy Parnell, Wariner	3:56
3.	"Snowfall on the Sand"	Kirsch, Wariner	4:51
4.	"Ride This Rocket"	Kirsch, Wariner	3:34
5.	"Steal Another Day"	Kirsch, Wariner	4:48
6.	"I Really Don't Have Anything" (featuring Allen Shamblin)	Allen Shamblin, Wariner	3:54
7.	"Welcome to This World"	Wariner	3:41
8.	"There Will Come a Day (Holly's Song)"	Wariner	4:02
9.	"I'm Your Man"	Sam Hogin, Bob Regan, Wariner	3:01
10.	"In My Heart Forever (For Chet)"	Wariner	3:38
11.	"Where Did I Go Wrong"	Wariner	3:31
12.	"The Weekend"	Beckie Foster, Bill LaBounty	3:57
13.	"You Can Dream of Me"	John Hall, Wariner	4:06
14.	"Some Fools Never Learn"	John Scott Sherrill	4:15
15.	"Small Town Girl"	John Barlow Jarvis, Don Cook	3:40
16.	"This Christmas Prayer"	Shamblin, Wariner	3:41
Total length:			62:48

== Personnel ==
- Steve Wariner – vocals, backing vocals (1–5, 7, 9, 11), acoustic guitars (1, 2, 4–12, 16), resonator guitar (1), bass (1), drum programming (1), electric guitars (2, 9, 14), classical guitar (3, 5, 8), baritone guitar (8), banjo (9), dobro (9), electric 12-string guitar (11), slide guitar (15)
- Billy Kirsch – acoustic piano (1, 3, 5)
- Shane Hicks – acoustic piano (2, 6, 8, 16), keyboards (5, 9, 12–14), keyboard strings (15)
- Matt Rollings – Wurlitzer electric piano (11), acoustic piano (14)
- John Barlow Jarvis – acoustic piano (12, 13, 15), keyboards (15)
- Richard Bennett – electric guitars (2, 5–8, 16)
- Lee Roy Parnell – slide guitar (2)
- Biff Watson – acoustic guitar (11, 14)
- Reggie Young – electric guitars (12, 13, 15), baritone guitar (13)
- Billy Joe Walker Jr. – acoustic guitar (13, 15)
- Lloyd Green – steel guitar (3, 6, 9)
- Mike Johnson – steel guitar (14)
- Rob Ickes – dobro (4, 10)
- Glenn Worf – bass (2, 3, 5–9, 11, 14, 16), upright bass (4)
- Woody Lingle – bass (12, 13, 15)
- Eddie Bayers – drums (2, 4–9, 11, 14, 16)
- Ron Gannaway – drums (12, 13, 15)
- Eric Darken – percussion (1–3, 5–9, 16)
- Terry Wariner – percussion (4, 12)
- Aubrey Haynie – fiddle (2, 4, 11, 15), mandolin (7)
- Jimmy Mattingly – fiddle (6)
- Harry Stinson – backing vocals (2, 3, 6–9, 16)
- Allen Shamblin – vocals (6)
- Kim Parent – backing vocals (6, 8, 14)
- Mac McAnally – backing vocals (11, 14)
- Bill LaBounty – backing vocals (12)
- John Hall – backing vocals (13)
- Lance Hoppen – backing vocals (13)
- Larry Hoppen – backing vocals (13)

The Nashville String Machine (Tracks 3, 8 & 16)

- Bergen White – string arrangements
- Bob Mason – cello
- Gary Vanosdale and Kristin Wilkinson – viola
- Conni Ellisor, Carl Gorodetzky, Lee Larrison, Pamela Sixfin and Alan Umstead – violin

=== Production ===
- Steve Wariner – producer
- Randy Gardner – recording, string recording, mixing
- Jason Breckling – recording assistant
- John Saylor – recording assistant
- Mike Poston – additional recording assistant
- Ronnie Thomas – editing
- Hank Williams – editing, mastering
- MasterMix (Nashville, Tennessee) – mastering location
- Caryn Wariner – production assistant
- Jim "Señor" McGuire – photography
- Cristian Pablo Rivano – art design
- Jason Severs – art design
- Holly Bonds – stylist
- Melissa Schleicher – hair, make-up
- Renaissance Management – management

== Chart performance ==
Album

Chart (2003)	Peak position
U.S. Billboard Top Country Albums	31
U.S. Billboard Independent Albums	12
