= Biff Watson =

- Born: Fletcher Bangs Watson V 1952 (age 73–74); Virginia, U.S.
- Genres: Rock music, country music
- Occupation: Musician
- Instruments: Vocals, guitar
- Years active: 1971–present
- Formerly of: Tennessee Pulleybone
- Website: biffbangs.com

Fletcher Bangs "Biff" Watson (born 1952) is an American guitarist, songwriter, and producer. His musicianship has been a part of recording sessions for many artists.

== Biography ==
=== Early years ===
Raised in Chatham, Virginia, Watson learned how to play guitar at age 11. Upon graduation from high school, he hitchhiked to Nashville where he played on demos and showcases, and backing up touring artists Crystal Gayle, Tracy Nelson, and Don Williams.

=== Recording session work and production ===
Watson focused on session work for producers such as Emory Gordy Jr. and Garth Fundis, and eventually branched out into record production.

Watson has worked with artists such as Dusty Springfield, George Strait, Dolly Parton, Toby Keith, Sara Evans, and Shania Twain.

=== Collaborations ===
Don Williams' backing band "The Scratch Band" included Watson, Danny Flowers, Dave Pomeroy, and Pat McInerney. They released one album, The Scratch Band Featuring Danny Flowers.

Watson was an original member of the band Tennessee Pulleybone along with Big Ken Smith, Jerry Tuttle, and John Wolters. The band recorded several singles for JMI Records in Jack Clements' studio.

Watson was a member of the band Tone Patrol, with Pomeroy, Kenny Malone, Larry Chaney, and Sam Bacco.

Watson has frequently been a member and leader of the Country Music Hall of Fame Medallion Ceremony Band. Other members have included John Hobbs, Eddie Bayers, Paul Franklin, Brent Mason, Michael Rhodes, Deanie Richardson, Tania Hancheroff, and Wes Hightower.

=== Other ===
Watson serves on the board of directors of the Country Music Association.

Watson is a Trustee of Local 257 Nashville Chapter of the American Federation of Musicians.

Watson serves on the Advisory Board of The American Music Channel, and is a partner in Trifectone Music Group, which writes, produces and performs the music for Bob Kingsley’s Country Top 40 Countdown.

== Discography ==
=== With Crystal Gayle ===
- 1978: When I Dream (United Artists)
- 1979: Classic Crystal (United Artists)

=== With Don Williams ===
- 1980: I Believe In You (MCA)
- 1981: Especially For You (MCA)
- 1985: New Moves (Capitol)
- 1987: Traces (Capitol / EMI)
- 1989: One Good Well (RCA)

=== With The Scratch Band ===
- 1982: The Scratch Band Featuring Danny Flowers (MCA)

=== Also appears on ===
Go to: 1986 - 1989 | 1990 - 1992 | 1993 - 1995 | 1996 - 1998 | 1999 - 2001 | 2002 - 2004 | 2005 - 2011 | 2012 - present

==== 1986 - 1989 ====
- 1986: Blue Monday - Murdered by Love (Kent)
- 1986: Nancy Vogl - Fight Like the Dancer (Olivia Records)
- 1988: Alabama - Southern Star (RCA)
- 1989: Juice Newton - Ain't Gonna Cry (RCA)
- 1989: Wagoneers - Good Fortune (A&M)
- 1989: Keith Whitley - I Wonder Do You Think of Me (RCA / BMG)

==== 1990 - 1992 ====
- 1990: The Bellamy Brothers - Reality Check (MCA / Curb)
- 1990: Mark Chesnutt - Too Cold at Home (MCA)
- 1990: Matraca Berg - Lying to the Moon (RCA)
- 1990: Aaron Tippin - You've Got to Stand for Something (RCA)
- 1991: Pat Alger - True Love & Other Short Stories (Sugar Hill)
- 1991: Lionel Cartwright - Chasin' the Sun (MCA)
- 1991: Billy Dean - Billy Dean (Liberty)
- 1991: George Fox - Spice of Life (Warner Bros.)
- 1991: George Jones - And Along Came Jones (MCA)
- 1991: Kenny Rogers - Back Home Again (Reprise)
- 1991: Marsha Thornton - Maybe the Moon Will Shine (MCA)
- 1992: Alabama - American Pride (RCA / BMG)
- 1992: Mark Chesnutt - Longnecks & Short Stories (MCA)
- 1992: Holly Dunn - Getting It Dunn (Warner Bros.)
- 1992: Kathie Lee Gifford - Sentimental Journey (Heartland)
- 1992: George Jones - Walls Can Fall (MCA)
- 1992: Doug Stone - From the Heart (Epic)
- 1992: Michelle Wright - Now and Then (Arista)

==== 1993 - 1995 ====
- 1993: Matraca Berg - The Speed of Grace (RCA)
- 1993: Mark Chesnutt - Almost Goodbye (MCA)
- 1993: Billy Dean - Fire in the Dark (Liberty)
- 1993: Darryl & Don Ellis - Day in the Sun (Epic)
- 1993: Kathie Lee Gifford - Christmas Carols (Warner Alliance)
- 1993: Kathie Lee Gifford - Sentimental (Warner Bros.)
- 1993: Alan Jackson - Honky Tonk Christmas (Arista)
- 1993: Dude Mowrey - Dude Mowrey (Arista)
- 1993: Turner Nichols - Turner Nichols (BNA)
- 1993: Ronna Reeves - What Comes Naturally (Mercury)
- 1992: Alabama - Cheap Seats
- 1994: Clint Black - One Emotion (RCA)
- 1994: BlackHawk - BlackHawk (Arista)
- 1994: Mark Chesnutt - What a Way to Live (Decca)
- 1994: La Toya Jackson - From Nashville to You (Mar-Gor)
- 1994: Patty Loveless - When Fallen Angels Fly (Epic)
- 1994: Reba McEntire - Read My Mind (MCA)
- 1994: Prescott-Brown - Already Restless (Columbia)
- 1994: Collin Raye - Extremes (Epic)
- 1994: Randy Travis - This Is Me (Warner Bros.)
- 1994: Michelle Wright - The Reasons Why (Arista)
- 1995: Alabama - In Pictures (RCA)
- 1995: BlackHawk - Strong Enough (Arista)
- 1995: Tracy Byrd - Love Lessons (MCA)
- 1995: Ty Herndon - What Mattered Most (Epic)
- 1995: Brett James - Brett James (Career)
- 1995: Martina McBride - Wild Angels (RCA)
- 1995: Victoria Shaw - In Full View (Reprise)
- 1995: Dusty Springfield - A Very Fine Love (Columbia)
- 1995: B. J. Thomas - I Believe (Warner Resound)
- 1995: Aaron Tippin - Tool Box (RCA)

==== 1996 - 1998 ====
- 1996: Paul Brandt - Calm Before the Storm (Reprise)
- 1996: Tracy Byrd - Big Love (MCA)
- 1996: Deana Carter - Did I Shave My Legs for This? (Capitol Nashville)
- 1996: Billy Dean - It's What I Do (Capitol Nashville)
- 1996: Ty Herndon - Living in a Moment (Epic)
- 1996: Patty Loveless - The Trouble with the Truth (Epic)
- 1996: Barry Manilow - Summer of '78 (Arista)
- 1996: Reba McEntire - What If It's You (MCA)
- 1996: John Michael Montgomery - What I Do the Best (Atlantic)
- 1996: David Lee Murphy - Gettin' Out the Good Stuff (MCA)
- 1996: Dave Pomeroy - Basses Loaded (Earwave)
- 1996: Collin Raye - Christmas: The Gift (Epic)
- 1996: Kevin Sharp - Measure of a Man (143 Records / Asylum)
- 1996: George Strait - Blue Clear Sky (MCA)
- 1996: Marty Stuart - Honky Tonkin's What I Do Best (MCA)
- 1996: Lari White - Don't Fence Me In (RCA / BMG)
- 1996: Chely Wright - Right in the Middle of It (Polydor)
- 1996: Trisha Yearwood - Everybody Knows (MCA)
- 1996: 4Him - The Measure of A Man (Benson Records)
- 1997: Sherrié Austin - Words (Arista Nashville)
- 1997: Matraca Berg - Sunday Morning to Saturday Night (Rising Tide)
- 1997: Mark Chesnutt - Thank God for Believers (Decca)
- 1997: The Kinleys - Just Between You and Me (Epic)
- 1997: Martina McBride - Evolution (RCA)
- 1997: Ricochet - Blink of an Eye (Columbia)
- 1997: George Strait - Carrying Your Love With Me (MCA Nashville)
- 1997: Shania Twain - Come On Over (Mercury)
- 1997: Lee Ann Womack - Lee Ann Womack (Decca)
- 1998: Deana Carter - Everything's Gonna Be Alright (Capitol Nashville)
- 1998: Paul Craft - Brother Jukebox (Strictly Country)
- 1998: Billy Ray Cyrus - Shot Full of Love (Mercury)
- 1998: Ty Herndon - Big Hopes (Epic)
- 1998: Martina McBride - White Christmas (RCA)
- 1998: Connie Smith - Connie Smith (Warner Bros.)
- 1998: George Strait - One Step at a Time (MCA Nashville)
- 1998: The Wilkinsons - Nothing But Love (Giant)

==== 1999 - 2001 ====
- 1999: Suzy Bogguss - Suzy Bogguss (Platinum)
- 1999: Tracy Byrd - It's About Time (RCA)
- 1999: Mark Chesnutt - I Don't Want to Miss a Thing (Decca)
- 1999: Jimmy Dean - 20 Great Story Songs (Curb)
- 1999: Faith Hill - Breathe (Warner Bros.)
- 1999: Matt King - Hard Country (Atlantic)
- 1999: Lace - Lace (143 Records)
- 1999: Lonestar - Lonely Grill (BNA)
- 1999: Tim McGraw - A Place in the Sun (Curb)
- 1999: Montgomery Gentry - Tattoos & Scars (Columbia)
- 1999: Kenny Rogers - She Rides Wild Horses (Dreamcatcher)
- 2000: Alabama - When It All Goes South (RCA)
- 2000: Jessica Andrews - Who I Am (DreamWorks)
- 2000: Lisa Angelle - Lisa Angelle (DreamWorks)
- 2000: Sara Evans - Born to Fly (RCA)
- 2000: Wynonna Judd - New Day Dawning (Mercury / Curb)
- 2000: The Kinleys - II (Epic)
- 2000: Jo Dee Messina - Burn (Curb)
- 2000: Aaron Tippin - People Like Us (Lyric Street)
- 2000: Steve Wariner - Faith in You (Capitol Nashville)
- 2001: 3 of Hearts - 3 of Hearts (RCA)
- 2001: Peter Cetera - Another Perfect World (Edel)
- 2001: George Jones - The Rock: Stone Cold Country 2001 (BNA / Bandit)
- 2001: Hal Ketchum - Lucky Man (Curb)
- 2001: Tim McGraw - Set This Circus Down (Curb)
- 2001: Toby Keith - Pull My Chain (DreamWorks)
- 2001: Patty Loveless - Mountain Soul (Epic)
- 2001: SHeDAISY - The Whole SHeBANG (Lyric Street)

==== 2002 - 2004 ====
- 2002: Toby Keith - Unleashed (DreamWorks)
- 2002: Jude Johnstone - Coming of Age (BoJak)
- 2002: Bill Miller - Spirit Rain (Paras)
- 2003: Harry Connick Jr. - Harry for the Holidays (Columbia)
- 2003: Wynonna Judd - What the World Needs Now is Love (Curb)
- 2003: Toby Keith - Shock'n Y'all (DreamWorks)
- 2003: Kenny Rogers - Back to the Well (Sanctuary)
- 2003: Lynyrd Skynyrd - Vicious Cycle (Sanctuary)
- 2003: Martina McBride - Martina (RCA)
- 2003: George Strait - Honkytonkville (MCA Nashville)
- 2003: Steve Wariner - Steal Another Day (SelecTone)
- 2003: Mark Wills - And the Crowd Goes Wild (Mercury)
- 2004: Andy Griggs - This I Gotta See (RCA)
- 2004: Willie Nelson - It Always Will Be (Lost Highway)
- 2004: Willie Nelson & Friends - Outlaws and Angels (Lost Highway)
- 2004: Joshua Payne - Your Love, My Home (Verve Forecast)
- 2004: Selah - Hiding Place (Curb)

==== 2005 - 2011 ====
- 2005: Merle Haggard - Chicago Wind (Capitol Nashville)
- 2005: Toby Keith - Honkytonk University (DreamWorks)
- 2005: Selah - Greatest Hymns (Curb)
- 2005: Carrie Underwood - Some Hearts (Arista)
- 2006: Toby Keith - White Trash with Money (Show Dog Nashville)
- 2006: Ali Lohan - Lohan Holiday (YMC)
- 2006: Kenny Rogers - Water & Bridges (EMI / Capitol)
- 2006: Bob Seger - Face the Promise (Capitol)
- 2006: Josh Turner - Your Man (MCA Nashville)
- 2006: The Wreckers - Stand Still, Look Pretty (Maverick)
- 2007: Toby Keith - A Classic Christmas (Show Dog Nashville)
- 2007: Lonestar - My Christmas List (Cracker Barrel)
- 2008: Dolly Parton - Backwoods Barbie (Dolly Records)
- 2008: Patty Loveless - Sleepless Nights: The Traditional Country Soul of Patty Loveless (Saguaro Road)
- 2009: Chris Young - The Man I Want to Be (RCA Nashville)
- 2010: Easton Corbin - Easton Corbin (Mercury)
- 2010: Billy Currington - Enjoy Yourself (Mercury)
- 2010: Lonestar - Party Heard Around the World (Saguaro Road)
- 2011: Toby Keith - Clancy's Tavern (Hump Head)
- 2011: Aaron Lewis - Town Line (R&J)
- 2011: Willie Nelson - Remember Me, Vol. 1 (R&J)
- 2011: Dolly Parton - Better Day (Warner Nashville)
- 2011: Gene Watson and Rhonda Vincent - Your Money and My Good Looks (Upper Management)
- 2011: Chris Young - Neon (RCA)

==== 2012 - present ====
- 2012: Troy Cassar-Daley - Home (Liberation Music)
- 2012: Easton Corbin - All Over the Road (Mercury)
- 2012: Lady Antebellum - On This Winter's Night (Capitol Nashville)
- 2013: Lady Antebellum - Golden (Capitol Nashville)
- 2013: Sylvie Vartan - Sylvie in Nashville (RCA / Sony)
- 2013: Chris Young - A.M. (RCA)
- 2014: Larry Cordle and Lonesome Standard Time - All-Star Duets (MightyCord)
- 2014: Bob Seger - Ride Out (Capitol)
- 2015: Clint Black - On Purpose (Blacktop)
- 2015: Easton Corbin - About to Get Real (Mercury Nashville)
- 2015: Amy Grant - Be Still and Know... Hymns & Faith (AG / Universal)
- 2015: Reba McEntire - Love Somebody (Starstruck / Nash Icon)
- 2016: John Gorka - Before Beginning (Red House)
- 2016: Lonestar - Never Enders (Shanachie)
- 2016: Charles Kelley - The Driver (Capitol Nashville)
- 2017: Selah - Unbreakable (Curb)

== Bibliography ==
- 2005: Chas Williams - The Nashville Number System ISBN 978-0963090676 - Watson contributed chart examples
