= Sure Feels Good =

Sure Feels Good may refer to:

- Sure Feels Good (song), a 2007 single by Ultrabeat vs Darren Styles
- Sure Feels Good (album), a 1987 album by Barbara Mandrell
