= Bill LaBounty (album) =

Studio album by Bill LaBounty
- Released: January 6, 1982
- Recorded: 1980–1981
- Studios: Warner Bros. Recording Studio (North Hollywood); A&R Recording Studio (New York City)
- Genres: Soft rock; yacht rock
- Length: 37:56
- Label: Curb Records/Warner Bros.
- Producer: Russ Titelman

Bill LaBounty chronology
Rain in My Life (1979)	Bill LaBounty (1982)	The Right Direction (1991)

Bill LaBounty is the fourth album by singer and songwriter Bill LaBounty. The album was released on January 6, 1982 by Curb Records/Warner Bros.

== Track listing ==
All tracks are written by Bill LaBounty, with additional writers noted.

Side one
No.	Title	Writer(s)	Length
1.	"Livin' It Up"	Barry Mann; Cynthia Weil	4:20
2.	"Didn’t Want to Say Goodbye"	Roy Freeland	2:47
3.	"Dream On"	Stephen Geyer	4:20
4.	"Slow Fade"	Freeland	4:14
5.	"Comin' Back"	Freeland	3:43

Side two
No.	Title	Writer(s)	Length
6.	"Look Who's Lonely Now"	Freeland	3:54
7.	"Never Gonna Look Back"	Weil; Kathy Wakefield	3:12
8.	"It Used to Be Me"	Freeland	4:10
9.	"Nobody’s Fool"	Mann; Weil	3:28
10.	"Secrets"	Freeland	3:48
Total length:			37:56

== Personnel ==
Adapted from the album's liner notes.

=== Musicians ===
- Bill LaBounty – vocals, Fender Rhodes (1, 2, 4–7), piano (3, 9)
- Clarence McDonald – piano (1)
- Greg Phillinganes – piano (4–6), Fender Rhodes (3, 8, 9), keyboards (10)
- Dean Parks – guitar (1–5, 7, 8, 10), guitar solo (3, 6), acoustic guitar (9)
- Steve Lukather – guitar (3–6, 9)
- Al Perkins – pedal steel (2)
- Willie Weeks – bass (1, 7)
- Chuck Rainey – bass (2–6, 8–10)
- Steve Gadd – drums (1)
- Andy Newmark – drums (2, 4, 8, 10)
- Jeff Porcaro – drums (3, 5, 6, 9)
- Ian Underwood – synthesizers (1, 3–7, 9, 10)
- Nyle Steiner – synthesizers (6, 7, 9, 10)
- Lenny Castro – percussion
- Russ Titelman – claves (3), tambourine (5, 10)
- David Sanborn – saxophone (1, 4)
- Kim Hutchcroft – saxophone (3, 6)
- Jerry Hey – trumpet (3, 5, 6), horn arrangements
- Chuck Findley – trumpet (3, 5, 6)
- Gwen Dickey – backing vocals (1, 9)
- Patti Austin – backing vocals (1, 6, 9, 10)
- James Taylor – backing vocals (2, 7)
- Leslie Smith – backing vocals (3)
- Jennifer Warnes – backing vocals (7)
- Stephen Bishop – backing vocals (9)
- Johnny Mandel – string arrangements (3)
- Nick DeCaro – string arrangements (4, 7–9)

=== Technical ===
- Produced by Russ Titelman
- Engineered by Mark Linett
- Mixed by Lee Herschberg and Mark Linett
- Mastered by Bobby Hata at Warner Bros. Recording Studio (North Hollywood, CA)
- Art direction – Mike Salisbury
- Photography – Norman Seeff
- Production coordinator – JoAnn Tominaga

== Charts ==
=== Singles ===
Year	Single	Chart positions	
Year	Single	US	AC
1982	"Never Gonna Look Back"	110	22
