= Wild Horses (Garth Brooks song) =

Single by Garth Brooks

from the album No Fences
- Released: November 20, 2000
- Recorded: 1990 (instruments); 2000 (vocals)
- Studio: Jack's Tracks (Nashville, Tennessee)
- Genre: Country
- Length: 3:08
- Label: Capitol Nashville
- Songwriters: Bill Shore, David Wills
- Producer: Allen Reynolds

Garth Brooks singles chronology
"Katie Wants a Fast One" (2000)	"Wild Horses" (2000)	"Beer Run (B Double E Double Are You In?)" (2001)

"Wild Horses" is a song co-written by Bill Shore and David Wills, recorded by American country music artist Garth Brooks on his breakthrough album No Fences in 1990. The song was not released as a single until November 2000, when it was released with a re-recorded vocal track. It peaked at #7 on the Billboard Hot Country Singles & Tracks chart.

== Content ==
On the surface, this song is about a cowboy's struggle between the love of the rodeo life and the love of a woman. He repeatedly promises to her that he will quit riding, but repeatedly breaks these promises because "wild horses keep dragging [him] away." As the song progresses he's preparing to "make her one more promise that [he] can't keep." It can be interpreted to be about a man who is repeatedly unfaithful and is forgiven, but knows his significant other will eventually stop forgiving him ("The way I love the rodeo / I guess I should let her go / before I hurt her more than she loves me").

== Chart performance ==
Chart (2000–2001)	Peak position
US Hot Country Songs (Billboard)	7
US Billboard Hot 100	50

=== Year-end charts ===
Chart (2001)	Position
US Country Songs (Billboard)	40
