= Child Support (song) =

Single by Barbara Mandrell

from the album Sure Feels Good
- B-side: "I'm Glad I Married You"
- Released: July 4, 1987
- Genre: Country
- Length: 3:53
- Label: Capitol Nashville
- Songwriter(s): Thom Schuyler
- Producer(s): Tom Collins

Barbara Mandrell singles chronology
"Sure Feels Good" (1987)	"Child Support" (1987)	"Angels Love Bad Men" (1988)

"Child Support" is a song written by Thom Schuyler, and recorded by American country music artist Barbara Mandrell. It was released in July 1987 as the first single from the album Sure Feels Good. The song reached number 13 on the Billboard Hot Country Singles & Tracks chart.

== Chart performance ==
Chart (1987)	Peak position
US Hot Country Songs (Billboard)	13
Canadian RPM Country Tracks	14
