= Rosemary Sharp =

American country music singer

- Origin: Fort Worth, Texas
- Genres: Country
- Occupation: Singer-songwriter
- Years active: 1987–1988
- Labels: Canyon Creek

Rosemary Sharp is an American country music singer. Between 1987 and 1988, Sharp released four singles on Canyon Creek Records, including "If You're Going to Tell Me Lies" which peaked at 67 and "Real Good Heartache" which peaked at 76. Three of her songs reached the Top 20 on the RPM Country Tracks chart in Canada. Her single "Didn't You Go and Leave Me" is included in the collection of the National Museum of American History.

== Discography ==
=== Singles ===
Year	Single	Chart Positions	
Year	Single	US Country	CAN Country
1987	"Didn't You Go and Leave Me"	85	17
1987	"Real Good Heartache"	76	17
1987	"If You're Gonna Tell Me Lies (Tell Me Good Ones)"	67	9
1988	"The Stairs"	68	—
