= It's a Crazy World =

Studio album by Steve Wariner
- Released: January 1987
- Recorded: 1986–1987
- Studio: Emerald Recording Studios and Sound Stage Studios (Nashville, Tennessee)
- Genre: Country
- Length: 37:00
- Label: MCA Records
- Producer: Jimmy Bowen (tracks 1, 8 & 9); Tony Brown (all tracks)

Steve Wariner chronology
Life's Highway (1985)	It's a Crazy World (1987)	Greatest Hits (1987)

Singles from It's a Crazy World
- 1. "Small Town Girl" Released: December 27, 1986; 2. "The Weekend" Released: April 25, 1987; 3. "Lynda" Released: August 3, 1987

Professional ratings
Review scores
Source	Rating
Allmusic	4.5/5 stars

It's a Crazy World is the fifth studio album by American country music artist Steve Wariner. It was released in 1987 by MCA Records. Three singles were released from it, and all three reached number-one. This album peaked at #30 on Top Country Albums.

== Track listing ==
No.	Title	Writer(s)	Length
1.	"Small Town Girl"	John Barlow Jarvis, Don Cook	3:47
2.	"Lynda"	Bill LaBounty, Pat McLaughlin	3:07
3.	"If I Could Make a Livin' (Out of Lovin' You)"	Dave Loggins	4:01
4.	"There's Always a First Time""	Steve Wariner, John Hall, Johanna Hall	3:31
5.	"Why Do Heroes Die So Young"	Wariner, Tony Brown, Paul Davis	4:29
6.	"When It Rains"	Wariner, Mac McAnally	3:29
7.	"It's a Crazy World"	McAnally	3:23
8.	"Hey Alarm Clock"	Loggins	3:42
9.	"The Weekend"	LaBounty, Beckie Foster	3:49
10.	"Fastbreak"	Wariner, Hall	3:15

== Personnel ==
- Steve Wariner – vocals, electric guitar solo (2, 6), acoustic guitar solo (5), acoustic guitar (6), backing vocals (10)
- John Barlow Jarvis – keyboards (1–4, 6–10)
- Mac McAnally – keyboards (2), acoustic guitar (2–5, 7, 10), backing vocals (2, 5–7)
- Randy Hart – keyboards (3), acoustic piano (6), Yamaha DX7 (7, 10)
- Tony Brown – acoustic piano (5)
- Paul Davis – keyboards (5), drum programming (5), backing vocals (5)
- Dave Innis – keyboards (8)
- Bill LaBounty – synthesizer programming (9), backing vocals (9)
- Richard Bennett – acoustic guitar (1, 8, 9)
- Billy Joe Walker Jr. – electric guitars (1, 2, 6–9), acoustic guitar (3, 4)
- Reggie Young – electric guitars (1–4, 6–10)
- Allyn Love – steel guitar (3, 6)
- Emory Gordy Jr. – bass (1–4, 6, 8–10)
- Kyle Tullis – bass (5)
- David Hungate – bass (7)
- Owen Hale – drums (1, 8, 9)
- Larrie Londin – drums (2–4, 6, 7, 10)
- George Grantham – tambourine (2), backing vocals (2)
- Terry McMillan – harmonica (8), tambourine (9)
- Vince Gill – backing vocals (3)
- Kyle Macy – backing vocals (4)
- Jim Photogolo – backing vocals (5)
- Terry Wariner – backing vocals (6)
- Dave Loggins – backing vocals (8)
- J.D. Martin – backing vocals (8)
- Russell Smith – backing vocals (8)
- John Hall – backing vocals (10)
- Lance Hoppen – backing vocals (10)

=== Production ===
- Jimmy Bowen – producer (1, 8, 9)
- Tony Brown – producer
- Willie Pevear – recording (1, 8, 9)
- Chuck Ainlay – mixing (1, 3–5, 8, 9)
- Steve Tillisch – recording (2–7, 10), mixing (6, 10)
- Bob Bullock – mixing (2, 7)
- Russ Martin – recording (8), second engineer
- Jeff Coppage – second engineer
- Marty Williams – second engineer
- Glenn Meadows – mastering at Masterfonics (Nashville, Tennessee)
- Jessie Noble – project coordinator
- Simon Levy – art direction
- Tal Howell – design
- Peter Nash – photography

== Chart performance ==
=== Album ===
Chart (1987)	Peak position
U.S. Billboard Top Country Albums	30
