= Katie Wants a Fast One =

2000 single by Steve Wariner with Garth Brooks

Single by Steve Wariner with Garth Brooks

from the album Faith in You
- B-side: "I Just Do"
- Released: June 17, 2000
- Genre: Country
- Length: 3:08
- Label: Capitol Nashville
- Songwriters: Steve Wariner, Rick Carnes
- Producer: Steve Wariner

Steve Wariner singles chronology
"Faith in You" (2000)	"Katie Wants a Fast One" (2000)	"I'm Your Man" (2003)

Garth Brooks singles chronology
"When You Come Back to Me Again" (2000)	"Katie Wants a Fast One" (2000)	"Wild Horses" (2000)

"Katie Wants a Fast One" is a song co-written by American country music artist Steve Wariner and recorded by Wariner and Garth Brooks. It was released in June 2000 as the second single from Wariner's album Faith in You. The song reached No. 22 on the Billboard Hot Country Singles & Tracks chart and peaked at No. 10 on the Canadian RPM Country Tracks chart. Wariner wrote the song with Rick Carnes.

== Background ==
Wariner told Billboard magazine that the song was "kind of a cross between Hank Williams' 'Honky Tonkin'' and a country mambo."

== Chart performance ==
"Katie Wants a Fast One" debuted at number 75 on the U.S. Billboard Hot Country Singles & Tracks as an album cut for the week of June 17, 2000.

Chart (2000)	Peak position
Canada Country Singles (RPM)	10
US Bubbling Under Hot 100 (Billboard)	9
US Hot Country Songs (Billboard)	22
