= Faith in You =

Studio album by Steve Wariner
- Released: May 9, 2000
- Studio: The Tracking Room and Emerald Studios (Nashville, Tennessee); Sound Kitchen (Franklin, Tennessee)
- Genre: Country
- Length: 48:16
- Label: Capitol Nashville
- Producer: Steve Wariner "Been There" produced by Clint Black

Steve Wariner chronology
Two Teardrops (1999)	Faith in You (2000)	Steal Another Day (2003)

Professional ratings
Review scores
Source	Rating
Allmusic	3/5 stars

Faith in You is the sixteenth studio album by American country music singer Steve Wariner, released on May 9, 2000. His third and final release for Capitol Nashville, it includes the singles "Faith in You" and "Katie Wants a Fast One", the latter a duet with labelmate Garth Brooks. Also included is the radio edit of the Clint Black duet "Been There", from Black's 1999 album D'lectrified.

== Critical reception ==
Giving it three stars out of five, William Ruhlmann praised Wariner for the multiple musical styles on the album, saying that "country is a music that rewards adherence to its heritage, and country has no more faithful servant than Steve Wariner."

== Track listing ==
No.	Title	Writer(s)	Length
1.	"High Time"	Steve Wariner, Marcus Hummon, Annie Roboff	4:11
2.	"Faith in You"	Wariner, Bill Anderson	3:54
3.	"I Just Do"	Wariner	3:06
4.	"Katie Wants a Fast One" (duet with Garth Brooks)	Wariner, Rick Carnes	3:08
5.	"Turn in the Road"	Wariner, Jim Witter	4:22
6.	"Make It Look Easy"	Wariner, Anderson	3:29
7.	"It Wouldn't Be Love"	Wariner, Joe Barnhill	2:57
8.	"Waiting in the Wings"	Wariner, Billy Kirsch	4:05
9.	"Been There" (duet with Clint Black)	Wariner, Clint Black	3:49
10.	"Longer Letter Later"	Wariner, Rodney Crowell	4:33
11.	"Blinded"	Wariner, Anderson, Sharon Vaughn	3:46
12.	"I Wish I Were a Train"	Wariner, Hummon	4:08
13.	"Bloodlines"	Wariner	2:49
Total length:			48:16

== Personnel ==
- Steve Wariner – vocals (1–12), acoustic guitar (1, 5, 9–12), electric baritone guitar (1), electric 12-string guitar (1), acoustic guitar solo (4), lap steel guitar (4), papoose (4), classical guitar (5, 8, 10), backing vocals (6, 7, 10, 12), acoustic 12-string guitar (7), high electric guitar (7), guitar solos (7), electric guitar (10, 13), bass (10) electric B-bender guitar (11)
- John Barlow Jarvis – acoustic piano (1, 4, 5, 12)
- Steve Nathan – synthesizers (1, 5, 7, 10, 12), Hammond B3 organ (1, 6, 11)
- Matt Rollings – acoustic piano (2, 3, 6–9), Wurlitzer electric piano (11)
- Joey Schmidt – accordion (10)
- Reggie Young – electric guitar (1, 4, 5)
- Ross Wariner – "power" guitar (1)
- Brent Mason – electric guitar (2, 3, 6, 7, 11)
- Biff Watson – acoustic guitar (2, 3, 6–8, 11)
- Michael Severs – acoustic guitar (4)
- Marcus Hummon – acoustic guitar (12)
- Ryan Wariner – electric guitar (13)
- Paul Franklin – steel guitar (2, 3, 6, 7, 12), dobro (11), wah lap steel guitar (12)
- Sonny Garrish – steel guitar (5)
- Jerry Douglas – dobro (9)
- Woody Lingle – bass (1, 4, 5)
- Glenn Worf – bass (2, 6, 7, 11), acoustic bass (3, 8, 12)
- Abraham Laboriel – bass (9)
- Ron Gannaway – drums (1, 4, 5), percussion (10)
- Steve Brewster – drum programming (1, 10), brush drums (2), trash cans (4)
- Eddie Bayers – drums (2, 3, 6, 7, 11, 12)
- John Robinson – drums (9)
- Tom Roady – percussion (1, 2, 4, 6–8, 11, 12)
- Lenny Castro – percussion (9)
- Jimmy Mattingly – fiddle (1)
- Aubrey Haynie – fiddle (2, 3, 6, 7, 12), mandolin (11)
- Stuart Duncan – fiddle (9)
- Jim Horn – baritone saxophone (4), horn arrangements (4)
- Dan Higgins – baritone saxophone (9)
- Sam Levine – tenor saxophone (4)
- Joel Peskin – tenor saxophone (9)
- Barry Green – trombone (4)
- Bill Reichenbach Jr. – trombone (9)
- Mike Haynes – trumpet (4)
- Gary Grant – trumpet (9)
- Jerry Hey – trumpet (9)
- Clint Black – harmonica (9), vocals (9), backing vocals (9)
- The Nashville String Machine – strings (2, 5, 8)
- Bergen White – string arrangements (2, 5, 8)
- Carl Gorodetzky – concertmaster (2, 5, 8)
- Bob Bailey – backing vocals (1, 11)
- Lisa Cochran – backing vocals (1, 11)
- Vicki Hampton – backing vocals (1, 11)
- Harry Stinson – backing vocals (1, 2, 4, 6, 7, 11, 12), hand drums (13)
- Thom Flora – backing vocals (2)
- Garth Brooks – vocals (4)
- Bekka Bramlett – backing vocals (4)
- Terry Wariner – backing vocals (5, 8, 10), baritone guitar (13), mouth percussion (13)
- Steve Real – backing vocals (9)

Crowd noise on "Katie Wants a Fast One"

- Holly Bonds, Kevin Bonds, Caryn Wariner, Ross Wariner and Steve Wariner

Production

- Steve Wariner – producer (1–8, 10–13)
- Clint Black – producer (9)
- Randy Gardner – recording, string recording
- Jason Breckling – recording assistant
- Bob Horn – recording assistant, string recording assistant
- John Saylor – recording assistant
- Chuck Ainlay – mixing at Sound Stage Studios (Nashville, Tennessee)
- Doug Delong – mix assistant
- Eric Conn – digital editing
- Carlos Grier – digital editing
- Denny Purcell – mastering at Georgetown Masters (Nashville, Tennessee)
- Caryn Wariner – production assistant
- Denise Jarvis – production assistance
- Carlton Davis – art direction
- Garrett Rittenberry – design
- Pamela Springsteen – photography
- Colourworks – digital imager
- Melissa Schleicher – make-up
- Renaissance Management – management

== Chart performance ==
Chart (2000)	Peak position
U.S. Billboard Top Country Albums	31
