= Blue Monday (band) =

Canadian hardcore punk band

- Origin: Vancouver, British Columbia
- Genres: Punk, hardcore punk
- Years active: 2001–2006
- Labels: Bridge 9 Records, For the Core Records, Stab and Kill Records, Perfect Victim Records
- Past members: Dave Mac; Kyle de Ville; Tony Patrick; Chris Pratt; Dave Mitchell; Jason Kehoe; Adam Mitchell

Blue Monday was a Vancouver-based hardcore punk band founded in 2001. Over its history the band consisted of Dave Mac, Kyle de Ville, Tony Patrick, Chris Pratt, Dave Mitchell, Jason Kehoe, and Adam Mitchell.

== History ==
Blue Monday was formed by guitarist Kyle de Ville and vocalist Dave Mac in the spring of 2001. After securing drummer Chris Pratt and bassist Tony Patrick, the band wrote an eight-song demo which came out in early 2002. After a few short tours down the west coast, Blue Monday entered the studio again in mid-2002 and recorded the 7-inch EP War Wounds which came out in early 2003 on For the Core Records.

Pratt and Patrick left the band, and Adam Mitchell and Jason Kehoe joined on bass and drums respectively. Adam's brother, guitarist Dave Mitchell, joined at the end of 2003. That year, Blue Monday released their second EP, What's Done Is Done on Stab and Kill Records. The band spent the bulk of 2003 and 2004 touring throughout the US, with fellow hardcore bands such as Mental, Desperate Measures, Far from Breaking, Lights Out, Final Word, Internal Affairs, The Distance, and Allegiance. They also provided backing vocals on the Promises Kept album by Champion.

What's Done Is Done and the subsequent touring brought Blue Monday to the attention of seminal modern hardcore label Bridge Nine Records, which signed them after they played the Summer Hardcore Festival Posi-Numbers in Wilkes-Barre, Pennsylvania. In December 2004, Blue Monday entered Atomic Studios in Brooklyn, New York and recorded their debut album for Bridge Nine (engineered by Dean Baltulonis). With the release of Rewritten in the spring of 2005, Blue Monday toured with label mates Champion and Terror, and completed a full US tour with Allegiance, and fellow Vancouver band Go It Alone. In October 2005, Blue Monday co-headlined a tour in Europe with Go It Alone. In 2006, Rivalry Records released a split EP of recorded performances from the tour.

In April 2006, Blue Monday announced that it was breaking up. No reason was given. Their last shows were in Seattle and Vancouver in September 2006.

== Discography ==
- Demo 2K2 (2002), Independent
- War Wounds (2003), For the Core Records
- What's Done Is Done (2003), Stab and Kill Records, Perfect Victim Records
- Rewritten (2005), Bridge 9 Records
- Blue Monday/Go It Alone split EP (2006), Rivalry Records
