= Life's Highway =

Studio album by Steve Wariner
- Released: 1985
- Studio: The Castle (Franklin, Tennessee); Emerald Recording Studio (Nashville, Tennessee)
- Genre: Country
- Length: 33:40
- Label: MCA Records
- Producer: Jimmy Bowen; Tony Brown

Steve Wariner chronology
One Good Night Deserves Another (1985)	Life's Highway (1985)	It's a Crazy World (1987)

Singles from Life's Highway
- 1. "You Can Dream of Me" Released: November 16, 1985; 2. "Life's Highway" Released: March 15, 1986; 3. "Starting Over Again" Released: August 16, 1986

Professional ratings
Review scores
Source	Rating
Allmusic	3/5 stars

Life's Highway is the fourth studio album by American country music artist Steve Wariner. It was released in 1985 by MCA. Three singles were released from it in 1986, and the first two singles, including the title track, went to number-one. This album peaked at #22. Rodney Crowell later recorded "She's Crazy for Leaving" on his 1989 album Diamonds & Dirt.

== Track listing ==
No.	Title	Writer(s)	Length
1.	"Life's Highway"	Richard Leigh, Roger Murrah	3:17
2.	"Back Up Grinnin' Again""	David Goodman	3:22
3.	"I Let a Keeper Get Away"	Steve Wariner	3:03
4.	"She's Crazy for Leavin'""	Rodney Crowell, Guy Clark	3:27
5.	"In Love and Out of Danger""	Craig Bickhardt, Wendy Waldman	3:34
6.	"She's Leaving Me All Over Town"	Wariner, Robert Byrne, Tom Brasfield	2:47
7.	"Natural History"	Wariner, Mac McAnally	3:19
8.	"You Can Dream of Me"	Wariner, John Hall	4:03
9.	"Starting Over Again"	Don Goodman, John Wesley Ryles	4:19
10.	"The Heartland"	Wariner, Wood Newton	3:49

== Personnel ==
- Steve Wariner – lead vocals, acoustic guitar (2), guitar solo (3, 6), backing vocals (7)
- John Barlow Jarvis – keyboards (1, 10), electric piano (2, 5, 7–9), acoustic piano (3–6)
- Tony Brown – synthesizers (1), truculent yell (4), acoustic piano (9)
- Shane Keister – synthesizers (2, 5), vocoder (7), organ (9)
- Reggie Young – electric guitars, wham bar (2)
- Billy Joe Walker Jr. – acoustic guitar (1–3, 8, 10), electric guitars (4–7, 9)
- Chet Atkins – Del Vecchio guitar solo (7)
- Jerry Douglas – dobro (1)
- Allyn Love – steel guitar (1, 2, 4)
- Mark O'Connor – mandolin (1), fiddle (6, 10)
- Emory Gordy Jr. – bass guitar
- Eddie Bayers – drums
- Farrell Morris – percussion (2, 5, 7)
- Gove Scrivenor – autoharp (10)
- Carl Jackson – backing vocals (1)
- Mac McAnally – backing vocals (1, 7, 10), acoustic guitar (4, 7)
- Harry Stinson – backing vocals (2, 3)
- Terry Wariner – backing vocals (4, 6, 10)
- Doana Kuper – truculent yell (4)
- Keith Odle – truculent yell (4)
- Giles Reaves – truculent yell (4)
- Paul Davis – backing vocals (5, 10)
- Wendy Waldman – backing vocals (5)
- John Hall – backing vocals (8)
- Lance Hoppen – backing vocals (8)
- Larry Hoppen – backing vocals (8)
- John Wesley Ryles – backing vocals (9)

=== Production ===
- Jimmy Bowen – producer
- Tony Brown – producer
- Steve Tillisch – recording, mixing
- Mike Hellman – assistant engineer
- Russ Martin – assistant engineer
- Keith Odle – assistant engineer
- Robbie Rose – assistant engineer
- Glenn Meadows – mastering at Masterfonics (Nashville, Tennessee)
- Simon Levy – art direction, design
- Peter Nash – photography
- June Morgan – make-up
- Austin Morgan – wardrobe
- Don Light Talent – management

== Charts ==
=== Weekly charts ===
Chart (1986)	Peak position
US Top Country Albums (Billboard)	22

=== Year-end charts ===
Chart (1986)	Position
US Top Country Albums (Billboard)	44
