= Starting Over Again (Steve Wariner song) =

Single by Steve Wariner

from the album Life's Highway
- B-side: "She's Leaving Me All Over Town"
- Released: August 16, 1986
- Genre: Country
- Length: 4:17
- Label: MCA
- Songwriter(s): Don Goodman, John Wesley Ryles
- Producer(s): Tony Brown, Jimmy Bowen

Steve Wariner singles chronology
"That's How You Know When Love's Right" (1986)	"Starting Over Again" (1986)	"Small Town Girl" (1986)

"Starting Over Again" is a song written by Don Goodman and John Wesley Ryles, and recorded by American country music artist Steve Wariner. It was released in August 1986 as the third single from the album Life's Highway. The song reached #4 on the Billboard Hot Country Singles & Tracks chart.

The song should not be confused with the 1980 Dolly Parton hit "Starting Over Again".

== Chart performance ==
Chart (1986)	Peak position
US Hot Country Songs (Billboard)	4
Canadian RPM Country Tracks	11
