= That's How You Know When Love's Right =

1986 single by Nicolette Larson with Steve Wariner

Single by Nicolette Larson with Steve Wariner

from the album Rose of My Heart
- B-side: "As an Eagle Stirreth Her Nest"
- Released: May 1986
- Genre: Country
- Length: 3:26
- Label: MCA
- Songwriter(s): Craig Bickhardt; Wendy Waldman
- Producer(s): Emory Gordy Jr. Tony Brown

Nicolette Larson singles chronology
"Let Me Be the First" (1986)	"That's How You Know When Love's Right" (1986)	"That's More About Love (Than I Wanted to Know)" (1986)

Steve Wariner singles chronology
"Life's Highway" (1986)	"That's How You Know When Love's Right" (1986)	"Starting Over Again" (1986)

"That's How You Know When Love's Right" is a song recorded by American country music artists Nicolette Larson and Steve Wariner. It was released in May 1986 as the second single from Larson's album Rose of My Heart. The song peaked at number 9 on the Billboard Hot Country Singles chart. The song was written by Craig Bickhardt and Wendy Waldman.

== Chart performance ==
Chart (1986)	Peak position
US Hot Country Songs (Billboard)	9
Canadian RPM Country Tracks	9
