= The Hand That Rocks the Cradle (song) =

Single by Glen Campbell with Steve Wariner

from the album Still Within the Sound of My Voice
- B-side: "Arkansas"
- Released: May 30, 1987
- Genre: Country
- Length: 3:05
- Label: MCA
- Songwriter: Ted Harris
- Producers: Jimmy Bowen, Glen Campbell

Glen Campbell singles chronology
"Any Day in America" (1986)	"The Hand That Rocks the Cradle" (1987)	"Still Within the Sound of My Voice" (1987)

Steve Wariner singles chronology
"The Weekend" (1987)	"The Hand That Rocks the Cradle" (1987)	"Lynda" (1987)

"The Hand That Rocks the Cradle" is a song written by Ted Harris and recorded by American country music artists Glen Campbell and Steve Wariner. It was released in May 1987 as the first single from Campbell's album Still Within the Sound of My Voice. The song reached number 6 on the Billboard Hot Country Singles & Tracks chart.

== Chart performance ==
Chart (1987)	Peak position
US Hot Country Songs (Billboard)	6
Canadian RPM Country Tracks	6
