= Sure Feels Good (album) =

Studio album by Barbara Mandrell
- Released: July 15, 1987
- Recorded: January 1987 (Nashville, TN)
- Genre: Country pop
- Length: 34:44
- Label: EMI America
- Producer: Tom Collins

Barbara Mandrell chronology
| Moments (1986) | Sure Feels Good (1987) | I'll Be Your Jukebox Tonight (1988) |

Singles from Sure Feels Good
- 1. "Child Support" Released: June 15, 1987; 2. "Sure Feels Good" Released: November 2, 1987; 3. "Angels Love Bad Men" Released: February 15, 1988

Sure Feels Good is the eighteenth solo studio album released by American country artist Barbara Mandrell. The album was released in July 1987 on EMI America Records and was produced by Tom Collins. It was Mandrell's first album released under EMI America since leaving MCA Records one year earlier.

== Background and content ==
Sure Feels Good was recorded in January 1987 in Nashville, Tennessee, United States. It was produced by Tom Collins, who Mandrell carried over from her MCA Records run. The album consisted of 10 tracks, similar to most of her previous albums. The sixth track entitled "Angels Love Bad Men" was co-written by Waylon Jennings and featured Jennings performing on the track with Mandrell. Jennings also wrote the album's opening track "Just to Satisfy You". Most of the album's material consisted of Country pop ballads as was her previous releases. Sure Feels Good was issued on an LP album with five songs available on each side of the record. The album was also issued on a compact disc a year after its initial release.

== Release ==
Sure Feels Good's title track was released as the lead single in March 1987. The song became Mandrell's first since 1969 to peak outside of the Top 40, reaching #48 on the Billboard Magazine Hot Country Singles & Tracks chart and #41 on the Canadian RPM Country Tracks chart. The second single released was "Child Support" in June 1987. It became the only significant hit from the album, peaking at #13 on the Billboard Country Singles Chart and #14 on the Canadian Country chart. The third and final single released was "Angels Love Bad Men" with Waylon Jennings, which only peaked at #49. Sure Feels Good was released in 1987 and peaked at #24 on the Billboard Magazine Top Country Albums chart.

== Track listing ==
Side one

1. "Just to Satisfy You" (Waylon Jennings, Don Bowman) – 3:30
2. "You Can't Get There from Here" (Keith Stegall, Roger Murrah) – 2:57
3. "It All Came True" (James Dean Hicks, Rick West) – 3:05
4. "Hangin' On" (B. Mize, I. Allen) – 3:58
5. "Child Support" – (Thom Schuyler) 2:49

Side two

1. "Angels Love Bad Men" (Jennings, Murrah) – 3:44
  - featuring Waylon Jennings
2. "One of Us Is Always Leaving" (R. C. Bannon) – 3:10
3. "Sunshine Street" (Murrah, Steve Dean, Rich Alves) – 3:11
4. "I'm Glad I Married You" (Hicks, B.P. Parker) – 3:55
5. "Sure Feels Good" (Carson Whitsett, Frederick Knight) – 3:25

== Chart positions ==
Album

| Chart (1987) | Peak position |
|---|---|
| U.S. Top Country Albums (Billboard) | 48 |

Singles

| Year | Song | Chart positions | |
| Year | Song | US Country | CAN Country |
|---|---|---|---|
| 1987 | "Sure Feels Good" | 48 | 41 |
| 1987 | "Child Support" | 13 | 14 |
| 1988 | "Angels Love Bad Men" | 49 | 40 |
