= Life's Highway (song) =

Single by Steve Wariner

from the album Life's Highway
- B-side: "She's Crazy for Leavin'"
- Released: March 15, 1986
- Recorded: 1985
- Genre: Country
- Length: 3:17
- Label: MCA Nashville
- Songwriters: Richard Leigh; Roger Murrah
- Producers: Tony Brown; Jimmy Bowen

Steve Wariner singles chronology
"You Can Dream of Me" (1985)	"Life's Highway" (1986)	"That's How You Know When Love's Right" (1986)

"Life's Highway" is a song written by Richard Leigh and Roger Murrah, and recorded by American country music artist Steve Wariner. It was released in March 1986 as the second single and title track from the album Life's Highway and was his fourth number-one hit on the Billboard Hot Country Singles & Tracks chart. It was also number 2 hit in Canada.

== Chart performance ==
Chart (1986)	Peak position
US Hot Country Songs (Billboard)	1
Canadian RPM Country Tracks	2
