= Bill LaBounty =

American musician

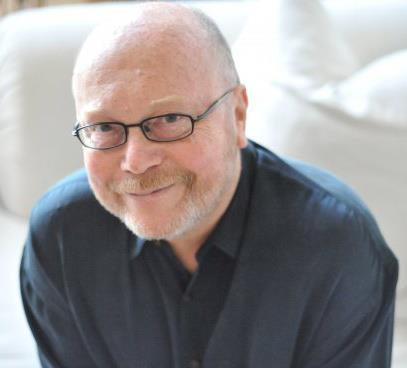

Background information
- Origin: Wisconsin, U.S.
- Genres: Soft rock; country
- Occupation: Singer-songwriter
- Instruments: Vocals, keyboards
- Years active: 1978–present
- Labels: Warner Bros./Curb, Noteworthy

Bill LaBounty is an American musician. He was initially a singer-songwriter in the soft rock genre. LaBounty was signed to RCA Records as part of the band Fat Chance when he was 19. As a solo artist, LaBounty recorded six studio albums, including four on Curb/Warner Bros. Records. His first charting single, "This Night Won't Last Forever", was covered in 1979 by Michael Johnson, whose rendition was a Top 20 pop hit that year, and eventually also covered by the country group Sawyer Brown in the late 1990s.

LaBounty was born in Wisconsin and raised in Idaho. He attended Boise State University where he founded his first band Fat Chance, which recorded one album for RCA Records.

In the mid-1980s, LaBounty married songwriter, Beckie Foster, and relocated to Nashville, Tennessee. LaBounty shifted his focus to country music and has co-written several songs for country music artists, including Steve Wariner's number one hits "Lynda", "The Weekend" and "I Got Dreams". LaBounty signed to a songwriting contract with Curb Publishing in 2001. Many of his songs were written with his wife, Beckie Foster.

== Discography ==
=== Albums ===
- Promised Love (1975, Warner/Curb)
- This Night Won't Last Forever (1978, Warner/Curb)
- Rain in My Life (1979, Warner/Curb)
- Bill LaBounty (1982, Warner/Curb)
- The Right Direction (1991, Noteworthy)
- Best Selection (2004, Columbia)
- Back to Your Star (2009, Chill Pill Records (US), T.a.c.s Records (Japan))
- Time Starts Now (2011, 4 CD boxset with unreleased tracks)
- Into Something Blue (2014)
- Love At The End Of The World (2026)

=== Singles ===
Year	Single	Peak chart positions			Album
Year	Single	US AC	US	CAN	Album
1976	"Lie to Me"	—	109	—	Promised Love
1978	"This Night Won't Last Forever"	46	65	81	This Night Won't Last Forever
1978	"In 25 Words or Less"	36	—	—	This Night Won't Last Forever
1982	"Never Gonna Look Back"	22	110	—	Bill LaBounty
2026	"Love At The End Of The World"	—	—	—	Love At The End Of The World

== Singles co-written ==
Bill LaBounty has also established himself as a songwriter for other artists.

- Brooks & Dunn – "Rock My World (Little Country Girl)"
- Robbie Dupree – "Hot Rod Hearts", "Brooklyn Girls"
- Michael Johnson – "This Night Won't Last Forever" (later covered by Moe Bandy and Sawyer Brown), "Trail to Your Heart (Sailing Without a Sail)," "Dancin' Tonight," "Twenty Five Words or Less," "Don't Ask Why", "Leave It Alone," "Old Fashioned Love"
- Lonestar – "Tequila Talkin'", "Heartbroke Every Day"
- Eddy Raven – "Sooner or Later"
- Sawyer Brown – "Used to Blue", "Heart Don't Fall Now", "This Night Won't Last Forever"
- Shenandoah – "I Want to Be Loved Like That", "Somewhere in the Vicinity of the Heart" (with Alison Krauss)
- Tanya Tucker duet with Delbert McClinton – "Tell Me About It"
- Steve Wariner – "Lynda", "The Weekend", "I Got Dreams", "The Domino Theory", "Drive"
- Jimmy Buffett with Steve Goodman – "Where's the Party"
- Gino Vannelli – "Total Stranger"
- Ronnie Milsap – "She Loves My Car"
- Bobby Caldwell – "She Loves My Car"
- Van Zant – "You've Got to Believe in Love"
- Agnetha Fältskog – "Let It Shine"
- Randy Crawford – "Look Who's Lonely Now", This Night Won't Last Forever, I Hope You'll Very Unhappy Without Me, In Real Life
- Shaun Cassidy – "Lie to Me"
- Conway Twitty – "When the Magic Works"
- Peter Cetera – "Holding Out"
- John Farnham – "Burn Down The Night"
