= You Can Dream of Me =

Single by Steve Wariner

from the album Life's Highway
- B-side: "I Let a Keeper Get Away"
- Released: November 16, 1985
- Genre: Country
- Length: 4:04
- Label: MCA
- Songwriter(s): Steve Wariner, John Hall
- Producer(s): Tony Brown, Jimmy Bowen

Steve Wariner singles chronology
| "Some Fools Never Learn" (1985) | "You Can Dream of Me" (1985) | "Life's Highway" (1986) |

"You Can Dream of Me" is a song co-written and recorded by American country music artist Steve Wariner. It was released in November 1985 as the first single from the album Life's Highway. The single stayed at number one for a single week and spent a total of twenty-two weeks on the Billboard Hot Country Singles & Tracks chart. Wariner wrote the song with former Orleans frontman John Hall.

== Chart performance ==
| Chart (1985–1986) | Peak position |
|---|---|
| US Hot Country Songs (Billboard) | 1 |
| Canadian RPM Country Tracks | 1 |

=== Year-End Chart ===
| Chart (1986) | Position |
|---|---|
| US Hot Country Songs (Billboard) | 7 |
