= Lynda (song) =

Single by Steve Wariner

from the album It's a Crazy World
- B-side: "There's Always the First Time"
- Released: August 3, 1987
- Genre: Country
- Length: 3:08
- Label: MCA
- Songwriter(s): Bill LaBounty; Pat McLaughlin
- Producer(s): Tony Brown

Steve Wariner singles chronology
"The Hand That Rocks the Cradle" (1987)	"Lynda" (1987)	"Baby I'm Yours" (1988)

"Lynda" is a song written by Bill LaBounty and Pat McLaughlin, and recorded by American country music artist Steve Wariner. It was released in August 1987 as the third single from the album It's a Crazy World. The song was Wariner's seventh number one single. The single went to number one for one week and spent a total of twenty-three weeks on the chart.

== Content ==
"Lynda" is composed in the key of D major, mainly around the chord pattern D-Bm-G-A_{sus}4. The song's success led to co-writer Pat McLaughlin signing to Capitol Records.

== Charts ==
Chart (1987)	Peak position
US Hot Country Songs (Billboard)	1
Canadian RPM Country Tracks	1
