= Small Town Girl (song) =

Single by Steve Wariner

from the album It's a Crazy World
- B-side: "When It Rains"
- Released: December 27, 1986
- Genre: Country
- Length: 3:45
- Label: MCA
- Songwriter(s): Don Cook; John Barlow Jarvis
- Producer(s): Jimmy Bowen; Tony Brown

Steve Wariner singles chronology
"Starting Over Again" (1986)	"Small Town Girl" (1986)	"The Weekend" (1987)

"Small Town Girl" is a song written by John Barlow Jarvis and Don Cook, and recorded by American country music artist Steve Wariner. It was released in December 1986 as the first single from the album It's a Crazy World. The song was Wariner's fifth number one country single. The single went to number one for one week and spent a total of 24 weeks on the chart.

== Charts ==
=== Weekly charts ===
Chart (1986–1987)	Peak position
US Hot Country Songs (Billboard)	1
Canadian RPM Country Tracks	1

=== Year-end charts ===
Chart (1987)	Position
US Hot Country Songs (Billboard)	45
