= The Weekend (Steve Wariner song) =

Single by Steve Wariner

from the album It's a Crazy World
- B-side: "Fastbreak"
- Released: April 25, 1987
- Recorded: 1987
- Genre: Country
- Length: 3:51
- Label: MCA
- Songwriter(s): Bill LaBounty; Beckie Foster
- Producer(s): Jimmy Bowen; Tony Brown

Steve Wariner singles chronology
"Small Town Girl" (1987)	"The Weekend" (1987)	"The Hand That Rocks the Cradle" (1987)

"The Weekend" is a song written by Bill LaBounty and Beckie Foster, and recorded by American country music artist Steve Wariner. It was released in April 1987 as the second single from the album It's a Crazy World. It was a number-one hit in both the United States and Canada, spending 23 weeks on the Billboard Hot Country Singles & Tracks chart.

== Music video ==
The music video was directed by Michael Salomon.

== Charts ==
=== Weekly charts ===
Chart (1987)	Peak position
US Hot Country Songs (Billboard)	1
Canadian RPM Country Tracks Chart	1

=== Year-end charts ===
Chart (1987)	Position
US Hot Country Songs (Billboard)	23
