= Steve Wariner =

American country musician (born 1954)

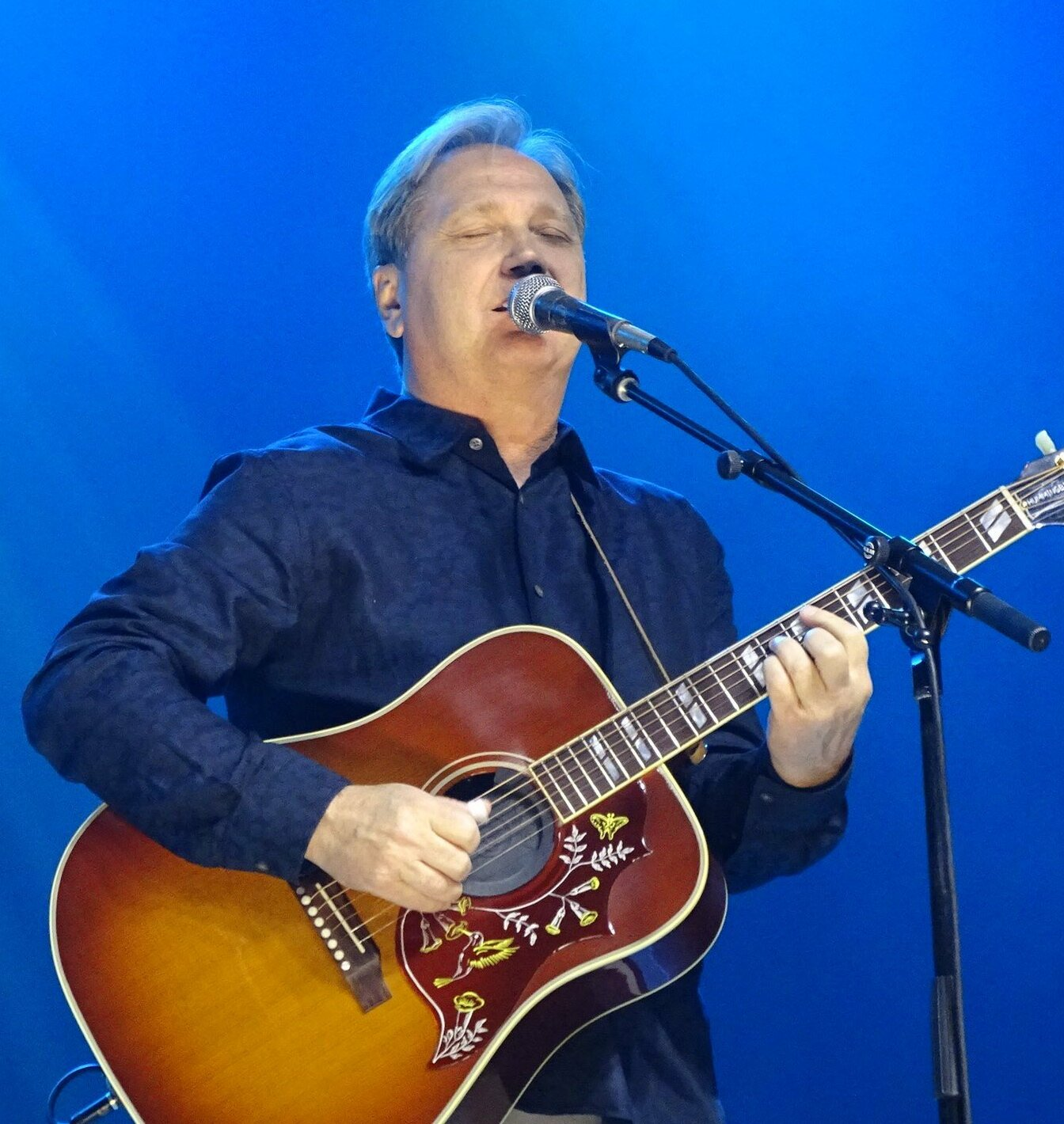
- Wariner in Hopkinsville, Kentucky, 2019
- Born: Steven Noel Wariner; December 25, 1954 (age 71); Noblesville, Indiana, U.S.
- Occupations: Singer; songwriter; guitarist; record producer
- Years active: 1973–present
- Spouse: Caryn Severs (m. 1987)
- Children: 2
- Musical career
- Genre: Country
- Instruments: Vocals; guitar
- Labels: RCA Nashville; MCA Nashville; Arista Nashville; Capitol Nashville; SelecTone
- Website: stevewariner.com

Steven Noel Wariner (born December 25, 1954) is an American country music singer, songwriter, and guitarist. Initially a backing musician for Dottie West, he also worked with Bob Luman and Chet Atkins before beginning a solo career in the late 1970s. He has released 18 studio albums and over 50 singles for several different record labels.

Wariner experienced his greatest chart successes in the 1980s, recording first for RCA Records Nashville and then MCA Nashville. While on these labels he sent a number of singles into the top 10 of the Billboard Hot Country Songs charts and received favorable critical reception for the amount of creative control he held over his body of work. Upon moving to Arista Nashville in 1991 he had his most commercially successful album I Am Ready, his first to be certified gold, but followups were less successful. After a period of commercial downfall, he experienced a second wave of success in the late 1990s which was spurred by co-writing the number-one singles "Longneck Bottle" by Garth Brooks and "Nothin' but the Taillights" by Clint Black. These songs led to him signing with Capitol Records Nashville and achieving two more gold albums with Burnin' the Roadhouse Down and Two Teardrops by decade's end. While his commercial success once again dwindled after these albums, he has continued to record independently on his own SelecTone label.

Ten of Wariner's singles have reached the number-one position on the Hot Country Songs charts: "All Roads Lead to You", "Some Fools Never Learn", "You Can Dream of Me", "Life's Highway", "Small Town Girl", "The Weekend", "Lynda", "Where Did I Go Wrong", "I Got Dreams", and "What If I Said" (a duet with Anita Cochran). Wariner holds several writing credits for both himself and other artists, and has collaborated with Nicolette Larson, Glen Campbell, Diamond Rio, Brad Paisley, Asleep at the Wheel, and Mark O'Connor among others. He has also won four Grammy Awards: one for Best Country Collaboration with Vocals, and three for Best Country Instrumental. In addition to these he has won three Country Music Association awards and one Academy of Country Music award, and is a member of the Grand Ole Opry. Wariner's musical style is defined by his lead guitar work, lyrical content, and stylistic diversity.

== Early life ==
Steven Noel Wariner was born on December 25, 1954, in Noblesville, Indiana, but grew up in Russell Springs, Kentucky. As a teenager, Wariner taught himself how to play several instruments, including acoustic guitar, bass guitar, drums, banjo, and steel guitar. Wariner performed locally in his father Roy Wariner's band, drawing influence from musical acts his father listened to such as George Jones and Chet Atkins. When Wariner was 17, country singer Dottie West heard him performing at the Nashville Country Club in Indianapolis and recruited him to play bass guitar in her road band. Wariner completed his education through a correspondence course with his local high school, and went on to play in West's band for three years; he also played on her 1973 single "Country Sunshine".

Wariner also began writing songs at this point, and West attempted to secure him a record label contract by submitting demos of his work, but was unsuccessful. He then left West's road band to put a greater focus on songwriting, and began touring with Bob Luman after he cut some of Wariner's songs. While in recording sessions with Luman, Wariner encountered guitarist Paul Yandell, who was also working for Atkins at the time. Yandell submitted some of Wariner's demos to Atkins, who was also vice-president of RCA Records Nashville at the time and was thus able to sign Wariner to a contract in 1976.

== Musical career ==
=== 1978–1984: RCA Records ===
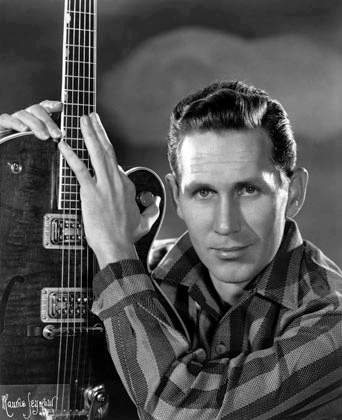
Chet Atkins, one of Wariner's major musical influences, helped him sign to RCA Records in 1976.

His first single release for RCA was "I'm Already Taken", a song that Wariner co-wrote. It peaked at number 63 on the Billboard Hot Country Songs charts in 1978. This was followed by five more chart singles, none of which appeared on an album at the time due to their limited success. These singles were primarily covers of songs by other artists, including Charley Pride's "The Easy Part's Over". Record World magazine published a positive review of this cover, which stated that it was a "slow, sad ballad" in which "Wariner continues to show a whole lotta vocal talent." Atkins also hired Wariner to be a bassist in his road band, which led to a nomination by the Academy of Country Music for Bassist of the Year in 1979. Also, Atkins served as his record producer on his first single releases, but later encouraged him to find a different one. As a result, "The Easy Part's Over" was instead produced by Tom Collins, known for also producing Ronnie Milsap and Sylvia.

His first major chart hit came in 1980 when "Your Memory" ascended to the number seven position on the country charts. Due to the song's success, Atkins fired Wariner from his band. "Your Memory" was the first of six singles from his self-titled debut album, which was also produced by Collins. After it came his first number-one single, 1981's "All Roads Lead to You", followed by the top 15 hit "Kansas City Lights". Both of these songs were written by Kye Fleming and Dennis Morgan. The album's last two singles, "Don't It Break Your Heart" and "Don't Plan on Sleeping Tonight", fared less successfully on the charts. Al Campbell of AllMusic stated that Wariner's "sophisticated country-pop sound was already perfected, and it showed by the quality of the material." In 1980, the Academy of Country Music nominated Wariner for Top New Male Vocalist.

RCA released his second studio album Midnight Fire in 1983. Tony Brown and Norro Wilson co-produced the album except for the last two tracks, for which Collins stayed on as producer. Contributing songwriters included Felice and Boudleaux Bryant, Jerry Fuller, and Richard Leigh. The closing track was a duet with Barbara Mandrell titled "Overnight Sensation", which also appeared on Mandrell's 1983 album Spun Gold. Wariner said that he chose to switch producers as a means of introducing more uptempo material, and both Wilson and Brown were working for RCA at the time. The lead single "Don't Your Memory Ever Sleep at Night" faltered on the country charts, but the title track was more successful, reaching a peak of number five. Following this was a cover of Luman's 1972 hit "Lonely Women Make Good Lovers", which in early 1984 matched the original version's Hot Country Songs peak of number four. The album's next two singles, "Why Goodbye" and "Don't You Give Up on Love", were less successful. Joy Lynn Stewart of the Red Deer Advocate praised Wariner's "fine, textured vocals" along with the combination of upbeat songs and ballads.

=== 1984–1990: MCA Nashville ===
When Wariner's contract ended in 1984, he chose to follow Brown to MCA Nashville. His first album for the label was 1985's One Good Night Deserves Another, which Brown co-produced with Jimmy Bowen. The album included three singles: the top-ten hits "What I Didn't Do" and "Heart Trouble", and his second number-one hit "Some Fools Never Learn". The Academy of Country Music nominated "Some Fools Never Learn" for Song of the Year in 1985, and Wariner later remarked that he considered it his favorite single. In the process of making the album, Wariner said that Brown and Bowen allowed him more control in the creative process than previous producers, by asking him to find his own material and then explain to them why he liked each song that he had chosen. The song selection process also allowed for a number of songwriters not typically found on albums of the era. These writers included Dave Gibson, Ronnie Rogers, Wood Newton, Paul Overstreet, and Steve Earle. Stewart wrote that "Wariner takes a fresh approach to traditional country and melds a unique, winning style", highlighting the ballad "You Can't Cut Me Any Deeper" and the "grand pace" of "Your Love Has Got a Hold on Me" in particular.

His next album, Life's Highway (1986), produced two consecutive number-one Hot Country Songs peaks: "You Can Dream of Me" and the title track. This was followed by the number four "Starting Over Again". Wariner co-wrote five songs on the album including "You Can Dream of Me", which he wrote with John Hall, then of the band Orleans. As with the previous album, Bowen and Brown requested that he have input on song selection and production processes; one such decision made by Wariner was not to have a string section on the album because he would not be able to include one in a live setting. Al Campbell of AllMusic reviewed the album favorably, stating that it "showed him moving into a more mature musical direction. The best moments here outshine anything Wariner had recorded up to that point". In between the releases of "Life's Highway" and "Starting Over Again", he was also a duet vocalist on Nicolette Larson's "That's How You Know When Love's Right", which was nominated for that year's Vocal Event of the Year from the Country Music Association. Wariner gained further exposure in this timespan for singing the theme to the television sitcom Who's the Boss?, which used his rendition from 1986 to 1990.

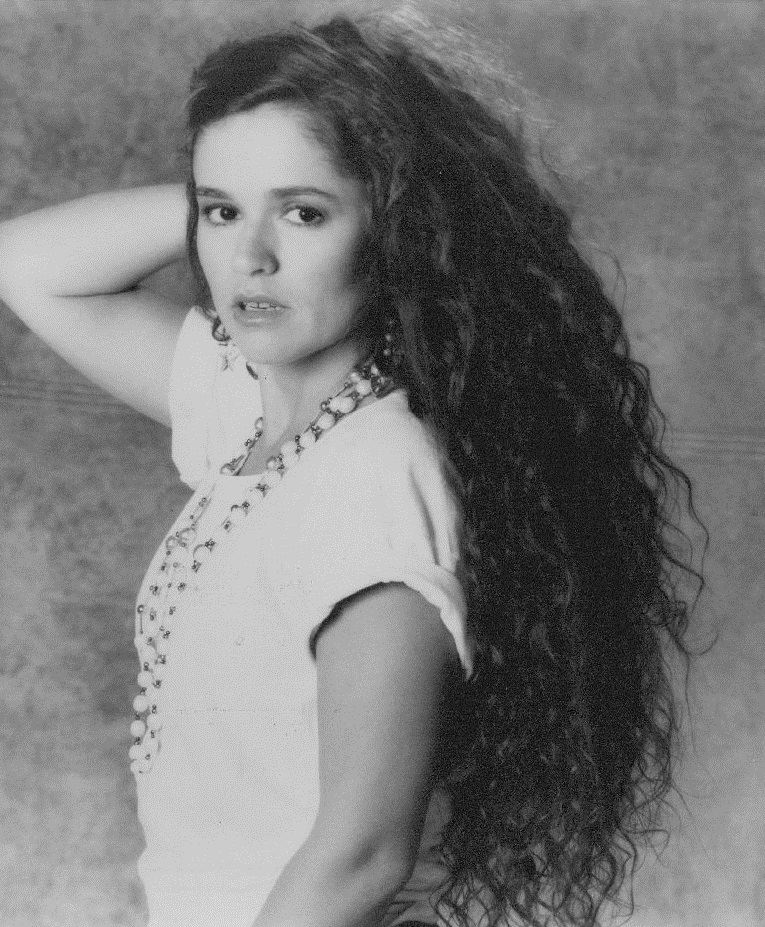
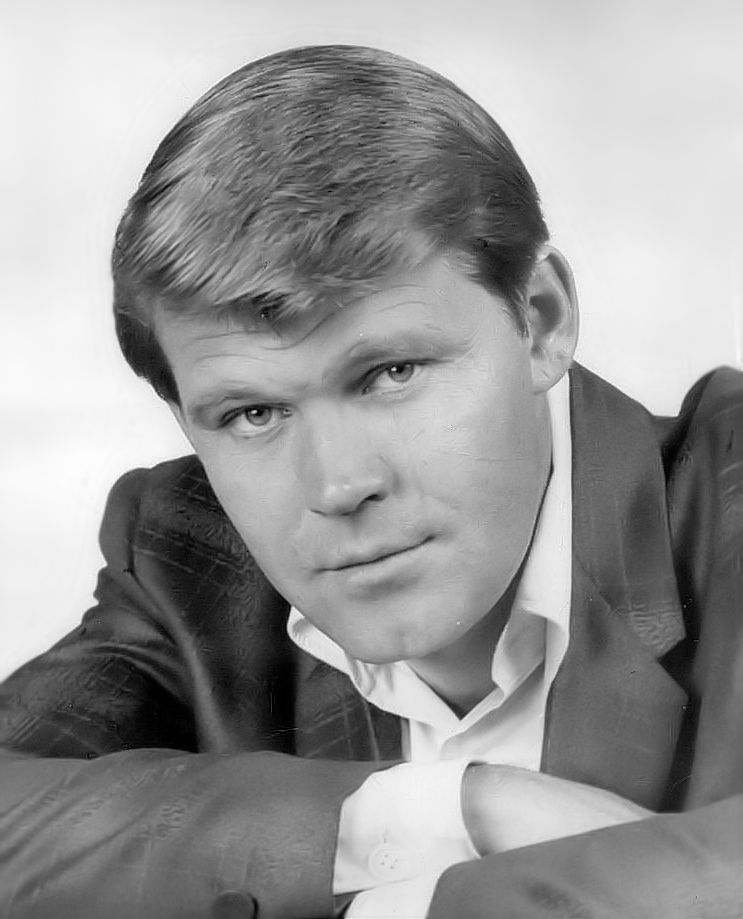
In addition to his own material, Wariner sang duets with Nicolette Larson (left) and Glen Campbell (right) in the late 1980s.

Overlapping with his first two MCA albums, RCA promoted two compilations of material. The first of these was a Greatest Hits album, issued in 1985. The following year, RCA compiled eight previously unreleased songs into an album titled Down in Tennessee. RCA also issued promotional singles from each compilation: "When We're Together" from Greatest Hits, and "You Make It Feel So Right", a duet with Carol Chase, from Down in Tennessee. Also featured on Down in Tennessee was an instrumental track called "Sano Scat". Ron Chalmers of the Edmonton Journal gave Down in Tennessee a mixed review, finding Wariner's vocals stronger on the ballads than on the uptempo material. His next MCA release was 1987's It's a Crazy World, which was his first to be issued on compact disc. The title track was written by Mac McAnally, who originally had a pop hit with it in 1977. All three of its singles topped the Hot Country Songs charts: "Small Town Girl", "The Weekend", and "Lynda". In between "The Weekend" and "Lynda", Wariner was also a guest vocalist on Glen Campbell's top-ten hit "The Hand That Rocks the Cradle". This song accounted for Wariner's first Grammy Award nomination in 1987, in the then-new category of Best Country Collaboration with Vocals. Also in 1987 he was nominated by the Academy of Country Music for Top Male Vocalist. Tom Roland of AllMusic reviewed It's a Crazy World positively, stating that "Wariner's in charge vocally, and seems to glide through the album effortlessly. He's received more responsibility for his own direction, and—with one or two exceptions— has upgraded every aspect of his record, particularly in song selection and musicianship." Wariner supported It's a Crazy World through a headlining tour that also featured Hank Williams Jr.

=== 1988–1990: End of MCA years ===
In 1988, Wariner issued I Should Be with You, his fourth release for MCA. It accounted for the top-ten singles "Baby I'm Yours", "I Should Be with You", and "Hold On (A Little Longer)". Wariner noted that the album contained a more country rock influence than its predecessors, particularly in the selection of session musicians such as Leland Sklar and Russ Kunkel, as well as Little Feat cofounder Bill Payne. The album continued Wariner's trend of writing his own material, as he wrote or co-wrote all three singles and three other songs on the album; he also co-produced for the first time, doing so with Bowen. I Should Be with You received a positive review from Cash Box magazine which stated that it was "a tightly crafted package, showcasing both contemporary and traditional country tunes." Wariner supported the album in 1988 by touring with Reba McEntire.

I Got Dreams, also co-produced by Wariner and Bowen, followed in 1989. Wariner wrote nine out of ten songs on the album, with collaborators such as McAnally, Roger Murrah, Mike Reid, and husband-and-wife duo Bill LaBounty and Beckie Foster. McAnally and LaBounty both sang backing vocals on the album, with the former also contributing on acoustic guitar and percussion. At the time of the album's release, Wariner noted that the chart success and positive fan reception of "I Should Be with You" inspired a continual growth in his songwriting. He also observed that, while he had not received strong record sales or industry awards, radio performance of his singles inspired him to "make the best records". I Got Dreams charted three singles on Hot Country Songs in 1989: "Where Did I Go Wrong" and the title track both went to number one, followed by "When I Could Come Home to You" at number five. The Ottawa Citizen writer Susan Beyer reviewed the album with favor, stating that "the more control Wariner gets over his recordings, the better they get...the sounds run the gamut, but elegantly, from acoustic country to rock-edged to adult contemporary."

Wariner released two albums in 1990, the first of which was Laredo. It accounted for three charted singles: "The Domino Theory", "Precious Thing", and "There for Awhile". LaBounty and Foster wrote "The Domino Theory", while Wariner co-wrote "Precious Thing" with McAnally. Production duties on the album were split, with Garth Fundis and Randy Scruggs producing three tracks each, and Tony Brown returning to produce the other four. Marc Rice of the Associated Press called Laredo a "safe, likeable album", praising the clarity of the production along with the "clever" lyrics of "The Domino Theory". Kay Knight of Cash Box magazine stated that "Wariner shows us a very basic and intimate look at his music and his life...this project should definitely bring Wariner into the spotlight of country radio." His second release in 1990, and final for MCA, was the Christmas album Christmas Memories. In the process of recording the album, Wariner said that he wanted it to have a "timeless" feel. It included traditional Christmas songs such as "Let It Snow! Let It Snow! Let It Snow!", "Do You Hear What I Hear?", three original songs written by Wariner, and collaborations with The Chieftains on renditions of "Past Three O'Clock" and "I Saw Three Ships". Wariner promoted the album through a radio special titled Steve Wariner's Acoustic Christmas, which also featured Emmylou Harris and Mike Reid. A year later, he performed in a television special on The Nashville Network also titled Christmas Memories which featured selections from the album.

While his tenure with MCA was ending, Wariner contributed to two cuts on Mark O'Connor's 1991 album The New Nashville Cats. The first was a cover of Carl Perkins' "Restless". It featured O'Connor on fiddle, with Wariner, Vince Gill, and Ricky Skaggs alternating on lead vocals and guitar. A number 25 entry on Hot Country Songs, it won all four artists that year's Vocal Event of the Year award from the Country Music Association, along with Grammy Award for Best Country Collaboration with Vocals. Wariner also co-wrote, sang, and played guitar on "Now It Belongs to You", another cut from the album which also made the country charts.

=== 1991–1996: Arista Nashville ===
Wariner left MCA amicably in 1991 and signed with Arista Nashville later that same year. His debut for the label was 1991's I Am Ready, which was produced by Tim DuBois and Scott Hendricks. The album's title came from a song that he had selected but ultimately chose not to include on the album, calling it "left field". The lead-off single, "Leave Him Out of This", achieved a top-ten peak on Hot Country Songs list in early 1992. It was followed by a cover of "The Tips of My Fingers", which was written and originally recorded by Bill Anderson in 1960 and was also a hit for Roy Clark in 1963. Wariner's version, featuring a backing vocal from Vince Gill, was the album's most successful single. It achieved a Hot Country Songs peak of number three in 1992, and the number-one position of the country music charts published by Radio & Records. The next single "A Woman Loves" also went into the top ten, but followups "Crash Course in the Blues" (featuring O'Connor on fiddle) and "Like a River to the Sea" were less successful.

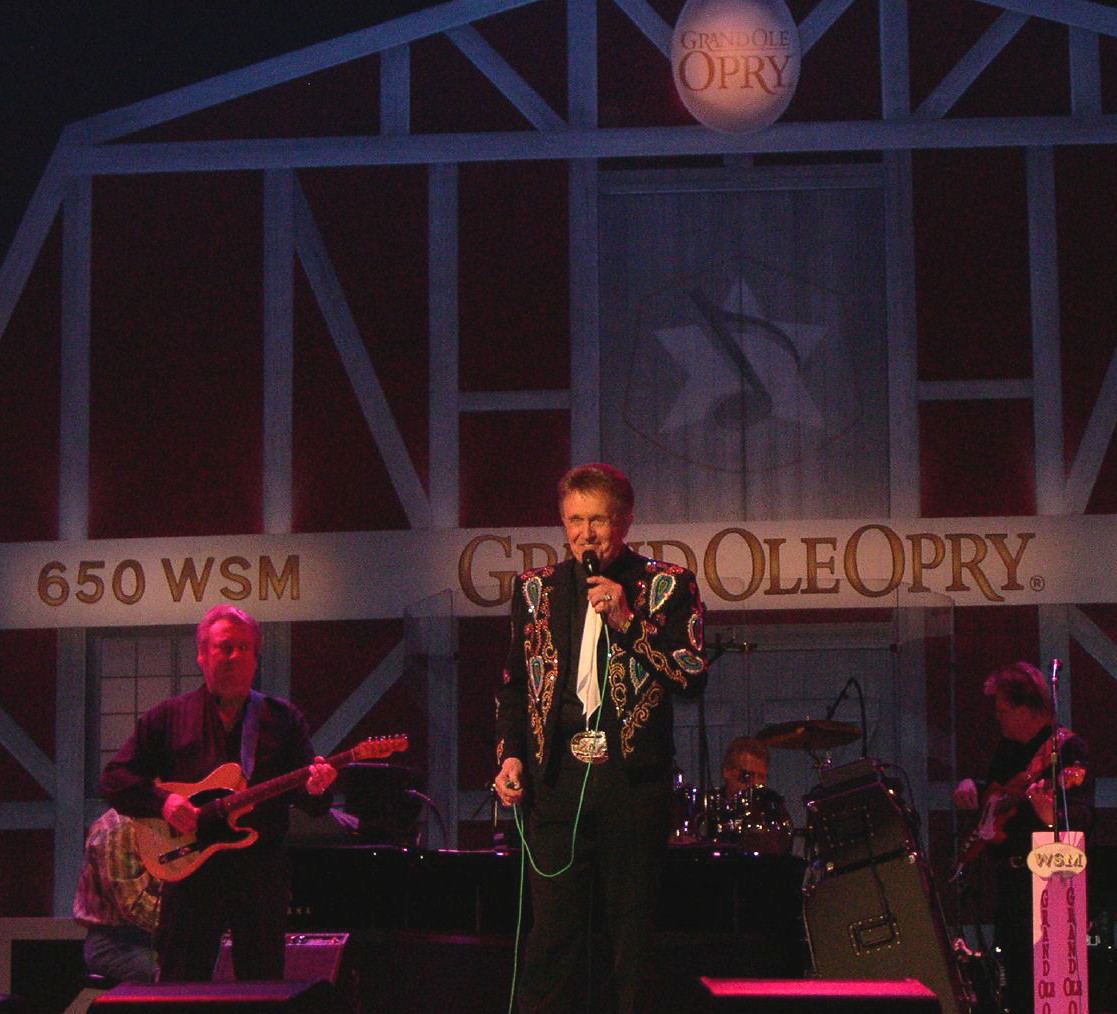
Wariner had a hit with a cover of Bill Anderson's "The Tips of My Fingers"; the two would later write Bryan White's 1997 hit "One Small Miracle" and Wariner's own singles: "Two Teardrops" and "Faith in You".

I Am Ready was met with largely positive critical reception. Brian Mansfield reviewed the album favorably on AllMusic, stating that "Wariner, a master of the subtle touch, builds this album's impact quietly and methodically", highlighting the vocal and instrumental performances on the singles in particular. Alanna Nash of Entertainment Weekly rated the album "B−", concluding her review with "if Wariner lacks a zippy repertoire, he nearly makes up for it with believable readings and deft vocal shadings". Jay Brakfield of the Dallas Morning News thought that the album had "contemporary lyrics" and "shows a more aggressive Wariner. He's doing the same thing, but now he's doing it better and doing more of it." I Am Ready became Wariner's first album to receive a gold certification from the Recording Industry Association of America (RIAA) for shipments of 500,000 copies in the United States. The corresponding tours for I Am Ready were the most commercially successful of his career to this point. In late 1991, the Takamine guitar corporation issued a limited-edition acoustic guitar model named after Wariner.

His second album for Arista Nashville was 1993's Drive. Its lead single was the top-ten "If I Didn't Love You". After it came the Top 30 hits "Drivin' and Cryin'" and "It Won't Be Over You", while the album's title track stopped at No. 63. Wariner told Cash Box magazine that he intended for the album to be representative of the energy present in his live shows. He also wanted it to be more upbeat than I Am Ready, which he felt contained too many ballads. Once again, Jarvis, Gill, and McAnally were among the musicians contributing; bluegrass singer Carl Jackson co-wrote and sang harmony on "The Same Mistake Again", while electric guitarist Brent Mason and steel guitarist Paul Franklin played on "It Won't Be Over You". He promoted the album throughout 1993 with a tour comprising the United States and Canada, sponsored by General Motors Canada. Also featured on the tour were Toby Keith, Larry Stewart, and Canadian country singer Cassandra Vasik. Despite the success of the lead single, DuBois (who was then the president of Arista Nashville) observed that the album sold poorly due to negative reception of the following singles by radio programmers. Patrick Davitt of The Leader-Post rated the album 3 out of 5 stars, praising the lyrics and arrangements of "It Won't Be Over You" and "Drivin' and Cryin'" as well as the "simpler country tunes" "(You Could Always) Come Back" and "The Same Mistake Again", but criticizing "If I Didn't Love You" as "repetitive" and several other album cuts for their "unbearably thick and heavy" sound.

Although he did not release any albums in 1994 and 1995, he appeared on collaborative works in the timespan. The first was Mama's Hungry Eyes: A Tribute to Merle Haggard, on which he joined then-labelmates Diamond Rio and Lee Roy Parnell on a cover of Merle Haggard's "Workin' Man Blues". Credited to "Jed Zeppelin", this rendition was also made into a music video, and charted at number 48 on Hot Country Songs. A year later, he contributed a cover of The Beatles' "Get Back" to the compilation Come Together: America Salutes the Beatles.

An instrumental album, No More Mr. Nice Guy, followed in 1996. Wariner told Guitar Player magazine that he had wanted to record an instrumental album for much of his career, but had considerable difficulty in getting permission from his labels: MCA executives would only allow him to do one instrumental song on an album, while he had to "beg and plead" Arista to allow him a full album. No More Mr. Nice Guy included various country and bluegrass musicians such as Atkins, O'Connor, McAnally, Gill, Sam Bush, Béla Fleck, and Diamond Rio lead guitarist Jimmy Olander; it also included folk guitarist Leo Kottke and Bon Jovi lead guitarist Richie Sambora, and a spoken-word intro by Major League Baseball player Nolan Ryan. While the project produced no singles, the track "Brickyard Boogie" (featuring Jeffrey Steele, Bryan White, Bryan Austin, and Derek George) was nominated for Grammy Award for Best Country Instrumental Performance in 1997. Chuck Hamilton of Country Standard Time noted the variety of musical styles present on the album, concluding that "if you appreciate good guitar playing by some of the best in the business, this one's a good pick." Also in 1996, Wariner was made a member of the Grand Ole Opry.

=== 1997–2001: Capitol Records ===
Wariner began writing songs for other artists in the late 1990s per the suggestion of his wife, Caryn, who also ran his publishing company and fan club. She had suggested doing so following the diminishing success of his previous albums. He wrote two songs that topped the Hot Country Songs charts between late 1997 and early 1998: "Longneck Bottle" by Garth Brooks (which also featured Wariner on background vocals and lead guitar at Brooks's request) and "Nothin' but the Taillights" by Clint Black; Bryan White also had a top-20 hit in this timespan with "One Small Miracle", which Wariner wrote with Bill Anderson. In addition to these, Wariner sang duet vocals on Anita Cochran's single "What If I Said". In early 1998, this song became not only Wariner's tenth number-one single on Hot Country Songs chart, but also his first entry on the Billboard Hot 100, reaching number 59. According to Wariner, some radio stations played these four songs consecutively, a move which he felt helped draw greater attention to his body of work. Based on the success of these songs, Wariner expressed interest in issuing another album, but said that Arista Nashville executives were reluctant to do so after the commercial failure of Drive and No More Mr. Nice Guy. In response, Brooks suggested that Wariner terminate his contract and sign with another label. In January 1998, Wariner underwent negotiations with multiple labels including Giant Records and Asylum Records before choosing Capitol Records Nashville, to which Brooks was also signed at the time.

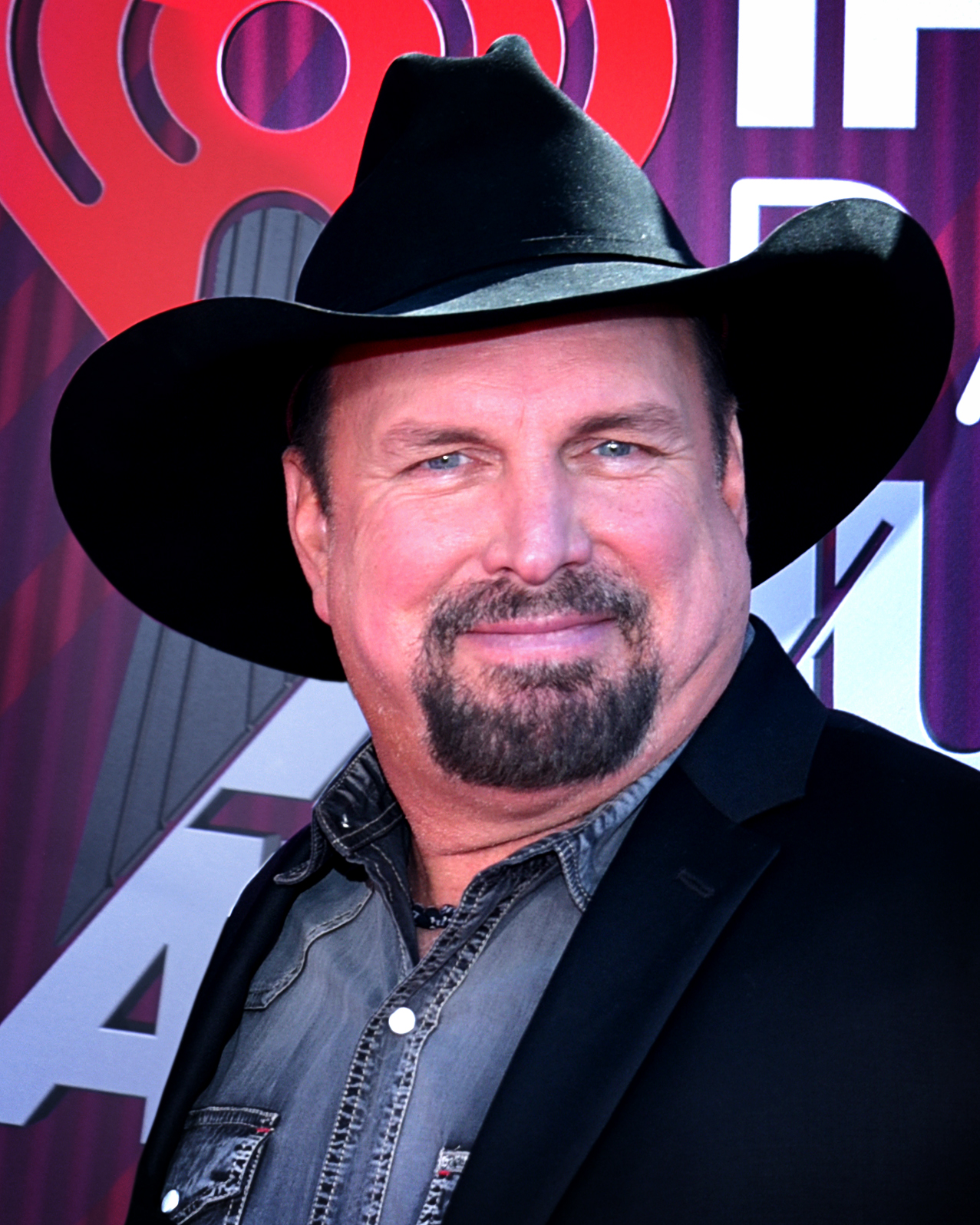
Garth Brooks recorded Wariner's composition "Longneck Bottle" in 1997; the two collaborated again on "Burnin' the Roadhouse Down" and "Katie Wants a Fast One".

His first Capitol album, Burnin' the Roadhouse Down, came out in April 1998. Leading off the album was the single "Holes in the Floor of Heaven", which spent two weeks at the number two position on Hot Country Songs. The album's other singles were its title track (a duet with Brooks), "Road Trippin'", and "Every Little Whisper". Wariner wrote or co-wrote and produced every song on the album except for "What If I Said", which was included as a bonus track due to its earlier success. Country Standard Time published a mixed review of the album, praising most of Wariner's lyrics while criticizing the title track as "predictably sappy". Thom Owens of AllMusic wrote of the album that "His music may not be as fresh as it was in the early '80s, when he was at the beginning of his career, but he's become a masterful craftsman, and that's why the album shines." By year's end, Burnin' the Roadhouse Down had become Wariner's second gold album. "Holes in the Floor of Heaven" won the 1998 Song of the Year award from the Academy of Country Music (where he also received Song of the Year and Video of the Year nominations for the same song), and Vocal Event of the Year nominations for both "What If I Said" and "Burnin' the Roadhouse Down". In addition, "Holes in the Floor of Heaven" received the 1998 Country Music Association awards for both Single of the Year and Song of the Year, and was nominated in the 1998 Grammy Awards for both Best Male Country Vocal Performance and Best Country Song.

Wariner's second album for Capitol was Two Teardrops. Released in 1999, it was certified gold as well. It produced only two singles: its title track, which Wariner co-wrote with Bill Anderson, and a re-recording of his debut single "I'm Already Taken". Respectively, these reached numbers two and three on the Hot Country Songs charts that year; they were also successful on the Hot 100, where they respectively reached numbers 30 and 42. Once again, Wariner produced the album himself. His brother Terry provided background vocals on "I'm Already Taken", and son Ryan played guitar on "So Much". The album also included a duet with Bryan White on "Talk to Her Heart" and an instrumental called "The Harry Shuffle". Nash rated the album "B", stating that "he continues to shape his persona as the hopeful but dashed romantic, and veers from country lopers to affecting philosophical ruminations. But in serving as his own producer, he fails to get his stronger emotions off the page." Owens said of the album that "It may not be the stunner Burnin' the Roadhouse Down was, but Two Teardrops proves that Wariner can continue to make winners." In addition to this, Wariner was one of several musicians contributing to "Bob's Breakdown", a song from Asleep at the Wheel's 1999 album Ride with Bob. The same year, he received a second Grammy Award out of three nominations: both "The Harry Shuffle" and "Bob's Breakdown" were nominated for Best Country Instrumental Performance, with the latter winning that award, while "Two Teardrops" was nominated for Best Country Song. By the end of the 1990s, Wariner had also played lead guitar on albums by Bryan White, Lila McCann, and Collin Raye.

His last Capitol Nashville album was 2000's Faith in You, which charted its title track (also co-written by Anderson) and "Katie Wants a Fast One", another duet with Brooks. Faith in You once again featured Ryan, this time as a lead guitarist on the closing instrumental "Bloodlines", and his other son Ross on "High Time". In addition to his usual guitar work, Wariner also contributed on lap steel guitar, mandolin, and the papoose (a higher-strung guitar manufactured by Tacoma Guitars). "Bloodlines" accounted for another Best Country Instrumental Performance nomination at the 2000 Grammy Awards. William Ruhlmann reviewed the album favorably in AllMusic, stating that it was "another consistent, craftsman-like effort from an artist who has made the most of his second chance in country music." Also in 2000, Wariner co-wrote, played lead guitar, and sang duet vocals on Clint Black's 2000 single "Been There" from his album D'lectrified; one year later, Keith Urban had a top-five hit with "Where the Blacktop Ends", which Wariner wrote with Allen Shamblin. Wariner's contract with Capitol ended when the label's president Pat Quigley exited.

=== 2003–present: SelecTone ===
In 2003, Wariner founded his own record label called SelecTone Records. His first album for the label was Steal Another Day. It accounted for the charting singles in "I'm Your Man" and "Snowfall on the Sand". Wariner recorded the album at a studio he had built behind his own house. In addition to its two singles, the album featured re-recordings of "Some Fools Never Learn", "You Can Dream of Me", "The Weekend", "Where Did I Go Wrong", and "Small Town Girl", along with "There Will Come a Day", a song that he wrote about his stepdaughter, Holly. Wariner promoted the album with a concert at the 2003 Indiana State Fair; he also made appearances at Walmart stores around Indianapolis to promote the chain's childhood literacy program Words Are Your Wheels. Wariner made an appearance at an 80th-anniversary celebration of the Grand Ole Opry in 2005, which included him and various other Opry members as part of a two-day concert. He also performed with The Grascals at the 2006 International Bluegrass Music Association awards.

In 2008, Wariner played guitar on two tracks from Brad Paisley's instrumental album Play: The Guitar Album: the multi-artist collaboration "Cluster Pluck", which won that year's Grammy Award for Best Country Instrumental, and "More Than Just This Song", which Wariner and Paisley co-wrote. One year later, Wariner released the instrumental album My Tribute to Chet Atkins. The album's track "Producer's Medley" won him another Grammy Award for Best Country Instrumental Performance. Jeff Tamarkin of AllMusic reviewed the album positively, stating that "Throughout the album, Wariner's guitar work is crisp, sharp and smart–he never attempts to imitate Atkins but he manages to embody him nonetheless." For this album, Wariner referred to himself as "Steve Wariner, c.g.p.", indicating the title "certified guitar player" which Atkins had bestowed to guitarists whom he respected. Other guitarists to receive this title from Atkins include Tommy Emmanuel, John Knowles, Marcel Dadi, and Jerry Reed. Wariner promoted the album through special concerts in Nashville, whose proceeds were donated to the Chet Atkins Music Education Fund.

Another instrumental album, Guitar Laboratory, followed in 2011. Contributors on the album included David Hungate, Aubrey Haynie, and Paul Yandell, along with Wariner's touring drummer Ron Gannaway and son Ross. JP Tausig of Country Standard Time noted the variety of musical styles on the album, particularly a jazz influence on some tracks. 2013's It Ain't All Bad returned Wariner to a vocal album after several instrumental ones. Chuck Yarborough of The Plain Dealer rated the album "A", noting rockabilly and bluegrass music influences on the album's sound, also highlighting the lyrics of "Arrows at Airplanes" and "Bluebonnet Memories". Following in 2016 was All Over the Map, on which Wariner played guitar, drums, upright bass, and steel guitar. The album included a mix of instrumental and vocal tracks, among which was "When I Still Mattered to You", a track that he wrote with Merle Haggard in 1996. It also included a collaboration with Ricky Skaggs on "Down Sawmill Road".

In 2019, Wariner was one of many artists inducted into the Musicians Hall of Fame and Museum.

== Musical styles ==
William Ruhlmann of AllMusic wrote that "in the beginning, the low-tuned guitars and wide range of his singles brought frequent comparisons to the early Glen Campbell hits." Richard Carlin of Country Music: A Biographical Dictionary similarly compared the RCA catalog to that of Glen Campbell, calling such songs "a pop-country backup that really wasn't suited to him". Carlin found the MCA albums more "progressive" and comparable to pop rock. Thomas Goldsmith of The Tennessean noted that many of Wariner's mid-1980s hit singles were "personal, down-to-earth songs of daily life." He also wrote that by the release of Life's Highway, Wariner had developed a "leaner country style" compared to the "pop-oriented tunes" of his earlier days. In a review of Faith in You also for AllMusic, Ruhlmann described Wariner's style by saying, "his abilities as a guitarist, understated but always apparent in the style of his mentor, Chet Atkins, provide a basic level of enjoyment no matter what else is going on." Brian Wahlert of Country Standard Time stated that "most of the time he releases pleasant music that is neither offensive nor exciting." Writing for the Dallas Morning News, Jay Brakefield contrasted Wariner's style with that of Vince Gill, saying that "like Gill, Wariner has a reputation as a superb guitar player and a terrific vocalist." Wariner noted that Atkins was influential in his early days as a recording artist, as Atkins encouraged Wariner to play his own lead guitar parts, and to emphasize the quality of a song over who wrote it. Despite this, Wariner also said that he only chose to include his own guitar solos on songs where he felt that they were necessary. Some of Wariner's songs employ scat singing over his solos, most notably "I Got Dreams".

Wariner's guitar playing style includes fingerstyle guitar and classical guitar, both of which he claims were inspirations from the work of Jerry Reed. In his early days when performing with Atkins, he recalls that Atkins would lend him a Gretsch guitar on which he was allowed to play solos. Nash wrote of Wariner's vocal and lyrical style that "the majority of Wariner's sweet-sad songs about lost opportunity forego front-page passion for little nuggets of long-term longing" and "his creamy tenor audibly caresses a lyric." An article in The Los Angeles Times noted of Wariner's musical image in the 1990s that, unlike his peers, he did not wear a cowboy hat; the same article described him as "just plain good...Wariner has an angelic voice, some solid songs and a staggering facility on the guitar." Many of his projects have been recorded in only one take, including Burnin' the Roadhouse Down, the track "I Just Do" from Faith in You, and the Atkins tribute album.

== Personal life ==
Wariner fathered his first son, Ryan, with Caryn Severs in 1984. After marrying in 1987, they had a second son, Ross. He also has one stepdaughter, Holly, who was diagnosed with juvenile diabetes. He has one sister, Barbara, and three brothers: Kenny, Dave, and Terry, the last of whom was a longtime member of his road band. His mother Geneva Ilene Wariner died on June 19, 2012, followed by his father, Roy Monroe Wariner, on July 7, 2017.

For much of the 1980s, Wariner developed an interest in stage magic, and would often include magic acts as part of his concerts. He also took up watercolor painting, and named his song "Like a River to the Sea" after one such painting.

== Discography ==
Studio albums

- Steve Wariner (1982)
- Midnight Fire (1983)
- One Good Night Deserves Another (1985)
- Life's Highway (1985)
- It's a Crazy World (1987)
- I Should Be with You (1988)
- I Got Dreams (1989)
- Laredo (1990)
- I Am Ready (1991)
- Drive (1993)
- No More Mr. Nice Guy (1996)
- Burnin' the Roadhouse Down (1998)
- Two Teardrops (1999)
- Faith in You (2000)
- Steal Another Day (2003)
- This Real Life (2005)
- My Tribute to Chet Atkins (2009)
- Guitar Laboratory (2011)
- It Ain't All Bad (2013)
- All Over the Map (2016)
- Feels Like Christmas Time (2021)

== Awards and nominations ==
List of awards and nominations received by Steve Wariner, sorted by year

Year	Association	Category	Work	Result
1979	Academy of Country Music	Bass Guitarist of the Year	—N/a	Nominated
1980	Academy of Country Music	Top New Male Vocalist	—N/a	Nominated
1985	Academy of Country Music	Song of the Year	"Some Fools Never Learn"	Nominated
1986	Country Music Association	Vocal Duo of the Year	"That's How You Know When Love's Right" (with Nicolette Larson)	Nominated
1987	Academy of Country Music	Top Male Vocalist	—N/a	Nominated
1987	Grammy Awards	Best Country Collaboration with Vocals	"The Hand That Rocks the Cradle" (with Glen Campbell)	Nominated
1991	Grammy Awards	Best Country Collaboration with Vocals	"Restless" (with Mark O'Connor, Ricky Skaggs, and Vince Gill)	Won
1991	Country Music Association	Vocal Event of the Year	"Restless" (with Mark O'Connor, Ricky Skaggs, and Vince Gill)	Won
1996	Grammy Awards	Best Country Instrumental Performance	"The Brickyard Boogie" (with Bryan Austin, Derek George, Jeffrey Steele, and Bryan White)	Nominated
1998	Grammy Awards	Best Male Country Vocal Performance	"Holes in the Floor of Heaven"	Nominated
1998	Grammy Awards	Best Country Song	"Holes in the Floor of Heaven"	Nominated
1998	Academy of Country Music	Vocal Event of the Year	"What If I Said" (with Anita Cochran)	Nominated
1998	Academy of Country Music	Vocal Event of the Year	"Burnin' the Roadhouse Down" (with Garth Brooks)	Nominated
1998	Academy of Country Music	Video of the Year	"Holes in the Floor of Heaven"	Nominated
1998	Academy of Country Music	Single of the Year	"Holes in the Floor of Heaven"	Nominated
1998	Academy of Country Music	Song of the Year	"Holes in the Floor of Heaven"	Won
1998	Country Music Association	Single of the Year	"Holes in the Floor of Heaven"	Won
1998	Country Music Association	Song of the Year	"Holes in the Floor of Heaven"	Won
1999	Grammy Awards	Best Country Song	"Two Teardrops"	Nominated
1999	Grammy Awards	Best Country Instrumental Performance	"The Harry Shuffle"	Nominated
1999	Grammy Awards	Best Country Instrumental Performance	"Bob's Breakdowns" (with Asleep at the Wheel)	Won
2000	Grammy Awards	Best Country Instrumental Performance	"Bloodlines"	Nominated
2008	Grammy Awards	Best Country Instrumental Performance	"Cluster Pluck" (with James Burton, Vince Gill, Albert Lee, John Jorgenson, Brent Mason, Brad Paisley, and Redd Volkaert)	Won
2009	Grammy Awards	Best Country Instrumental Performance	"Producer's Medley"	Won
