= Bryan White discography =

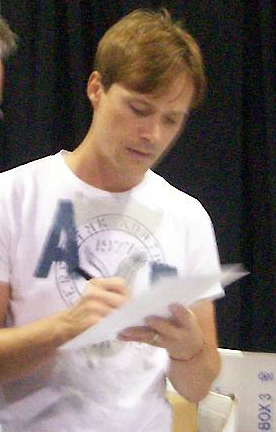
- Bryan White at CMA Music Festival in June 2010
- Studio albums: 6
- Extended plays: 3
- Compilation albums: 3
- Singles: 18
- Music videos: 13
- No. 1 singles: 6

Bryan White is an American country music singer. In his career, he has released six studio albums and a greatest hits package, all on Asylum Records, as well as two Christmas-themed EPs, one of which was also issued on Asylum. His first two studio albums — his 1994 self-titled debut and 1996's Between Now and Forever — were both certified platinum by the RIAA for shipping one million copies in the US, while 1997's The Right Place was certified gold by the RIAA.

His releases for Asylum have accounted for 15 singles on the Billboard Hot Country Songs chart. Of these, six reached number one: "Someone Else's Star" (1995), "Rebecca Lynn" (1996), "So Much for Pretending" (1996), and "Sittin' on Go" (1997). "So Much for Pretending" is the longest-lasting of these four, with a two-week stay at number one. Two additional top 10 hits, 1996's "I'm Not Supposed to Love You Anymore" "From This Moment On" with Shania Twain, and 1997's "Love Is the Right Place", peaked at number four on the same chart.

White has also charted a Christmas single, 1999's "Holiday Inn", as well as two guest singles. The first of these was a multi-artist charity single entitled "One Heart at a Time", and the second was a duet vocal on Shania Twain's "From This Moment On". Although this song crossed over to the Billboard Hot 100, White did not receive chart credit for it outside the country charts in the United States.

== Studio albums ==
Year	Album details	Peak chart positions			Certifications (sales threshold
Year	Album details	US Country	US	CAN Country	Certifications (sales threshold
Bryan White	Release date: October 11, 1994; Label: Asylum; Formats: CD, cassette	13	88	—	US: Platinum
Between Now and Forever	Release date: March 26, 1996; Label: Asylum; Formats: CD, cassette	7	52	3	CAN: Gold; US: Platinum
The Right Place	Release date: September 23, 1997; Label: Asylum; Formats: CD, cassette	7	41	15	US: Gold
How Lucky I Am	Release date: August 24, 1999; Label: Asylum; Formats: CD, cassette	7	81	—	
Dustbowl Dreams	Release date: September 28, 2009; Label: Just a Pup; Formats: CD, digital download	—	—	—	
"—" denotes releases that did not chart

== Compilation albums ==
Title	Album details	Peak positions
Title	Album details	US Country
Greatest Hits	Release date: October 31, 2000; Label: Asylum; Formats: CD, cassette	25

== Extended plays ==
Title	Album details
Dreaming of Christmas	Release date: October 26, 1999; Label: Asylum; Formats: CD, cassette
My Christmas Project	Release date: September 17, 2006; Label: Self-released; Formats: CD, digital download

== Singles ==
Year	Single	Peak chart positions			Album
Year	Single	US Country	US Bubbling	CAN Country	Album
1994	"Eugene You Genius"	48	—	85	Bryan White
1994	"Look at Me Now"	24	—	12	Bryan White
1995	"Someone Else's Star"	1	12	5	Bryan White
1995	"Rebecca Lynn"	1	14	2	Bryan White
1996	"I'm Not Supposed to Love You Anymore"	4	1	2	Between Now and Forever
1996	"So Much for Pretending"	1	19	1	Between Now and Forever
1996	"That's Another Song"	15	—	10	Between Now and Forever
1997	"Sittin' on Go"	1	—	1	Between Now and Forever
1997	"Love Is the Right Place"	4	1	3	The Right Place
1997	"One Small Miracle"	16	—	22	The Right Place
1998	"Bad Day to Let You Go"	30	—	23	The Right Place
1998	"Tree of Hearts"	45	—	55	The Right Place
1999	"You're Still Beautiful to Me"	39	—	24	How Lucky I Am
1999	"God Gave Me You"	40	—	49	How Lucky I Am
2000	"How Long"	56	—	—	Greatest Hits
2009	"The Little Things"	—	—	—	Dustbowl Dreams
2009	"Gotta Have My Java"	—	—	—	Dustbowl Dreams
"—" denotes releases that did not chart

== Other singles ==
=== Guest singles ===
Year	Single	Artist	Peak chart positions					Album
Year	Single	Artist	US Country	US	CAN Country	CAN	CAN AC	Album
1998	"One Heart at a Time"	Various artists	69	56	—	—	—	charity single
1998	"From This Moment On"	Shania Twain	6	4	1	4	1	Come On Over
"—" denotes releases that did not chart

=== Other charted songs ===
Year	Single	Peak positions	Album
Year	Single	US Country	Album
1999	"Holiday Inn"	62	Dreaming of Christmas

== Music videos ==
Year	Title	Director
1994	"Eugene You Genius"	Wayne Miller
1995	"Look at Me Now"	Jeffrey C. Phillips
1995	"Someone Else's Star"	John Lloyd Miller
1996	"Rebecca Lynn"	Jeffrey C. Phillips
1996	"I'm Not Supposed to Love You Anymore"	Jeffrey C. Phillips
1996	"So Much for Pretending"	Jeffrey C. Phillips
1996	"That's Another Song"	Jeffrey C. Phillips
1997	"Love Is the Right Place"	Jeffrey C. Phillips
1997	"One Small Miracle"	Jeffrey C. Phillips
1998	"Tree of Hearts"	Jeffrey C. Phillips
1999	"You're Still Beautiful to Me"	Peter Zavadil
2001	"How Long"	
2009	"The Little Things"	

=== Guest appearances ===
Year	Title	
1998	"One Heart at a Time" (with Garth Brooks, Neal McCoy, Olivia Newton-John, Faith Hill, Billy Dean, Michael McDonald and Victoria Shaw)	Ritch Sublett
