= Greatest Hits (Bryan White album) =

Greatest hits album by Bryan White
- Released: October 31, 2000
- Genre: Country
- Length: 41:26
- Label: Asylum
- Producer: Billy Joe Walker Jr.; Kyle Lehning; Robert John "Mutt" Lange

Bryan White chronology
How Lucky I Am (1999)	Greatest Hits (2000)	My Christmas Project (2006)

Singles from Greatest Hits
- 1. "How Long" Released: October 23, 2000

Professional ratings
Review scores
Source	Rating
Allmusic	link

Greatest Hits is the first compilation album by American country music artist Bryan White. It was released on October 31, 2000, via Asylum Records as his final release for the label. The compilation includes nine of his singles from his three Asylum records, Bryan White (1994), Between Now and Forever (1996), and The Right Place (1997), including his four number one singles on the US Billboard Hot Country Songs chart. The compilation also includes his duet with Canadian singer Shania Twain, "From This Moment On", which became a huge success on the country charts for both of them.

Two new tracks were recorded for this compilation: "The Way You Look at Me" and "How Long", the former co-written by Toby Keith collaborator Scotty Emerick. "How Long" was serviced as the album's sole single, reaching number 58 on the US country airplay chart where it is to date his final charting single there.

== Track listing ==
Greatest Hits track listing
No.	Title	Writer(s)	Original album	Length
1.	"Love Is the Right Place"	Marcus Hummon; Tommy Sims	The Right Place	3:14
2.	"Rebecca Lynn"	Skip Ewing; Don Sampson	Bryan White	3:58
3.	"Sittin' on Go"	Josh Leo; Rick Bowles	Between Now and Forever	3:08
4.	"I'm Not Supposed to Love You Anymore"	Ewing; Donny Kees	Between Now and Forever	3:43
5.	"How Long"	Andrew Williams; David Williams	New recording	3:40
6.	"From This Moment On" (duet with Shania Twain)	Shania Twain; Robert John "Mutt" Lange	Twain's Come On Over	4:41
7.	"That's Another Song"	Julie Medders; Monty Powell; John Paul Daniel Doug Pincock	Between Now and Forever	3:09
8.	"So Much for Pretending"	Bryan White; Derek George; John Tirro	Between Now and Forever	2:31
9.	"The Way You Look at Me"	Scotty Emerick; Tirro	New recording	3:03
10.	"One Small Miracle"	Bill Anderson; Steve Wariner	The Right Place	3:51
11.	"Look at Me Now"	White; George; Tirro	Bryan White	3:07
12.	"Someone Else's Star"	Ewing; Jim Weatherly	Bryan White	3:21
Total length:				41:26

== Personnel ==
Taken from the album booklet.

- Eddie Bayers – drums, percussion
- Michael Black – background vocals
- Bekka Bramlett – background vocals
- Mike Brignardello – bass guitar
- Dennis Burnside – electric piano
- Larry Byrom – acoustic guitar, electric guitar
- Mark Casstevens – acoustic guitar
- Jerry Douglas – dobro
- Dan Dugmore – pedal steel guitar, lap steel guitar
- Stuart Duncan – fiddle
- Scotty Emerick – acoustic guitar, background vocals
- Paul Franklin – pedal steel guitar
- Derek George – acoustic guitar, background vocals
- Aubrey Haynie – fiddle
- Wes Hightower – background vocals
- John Hobbs – keyboards, organ
- Dann Huff – electric guitar
- John Barlow Jarvis – piano
- Paul Leim – drums, percussion
- Chris Leuzinger – electric guitar
- B. James Lowry – acoustic guitar
- Liana Manis – background vocals
- Steveland Marris – background vocals
- Brent Mason – bass guitar, electric guitar
- Randy McCormick – piano
- Terry McMillan – percussion
- Steve Nathan – keyboards, Hammond organ, piano, synthesizer, Wurlitzer
- Michael Rhodes – bass guitar
- Hargus "Pig" Robbins – electric piano
- Matt Rollings – keyboards, piano
- John Wesley Ryles – background vocals
- Steuart Smith – electric guitar
- Harry Stinson – background vocals
- Shania Twain – vocals on "From This Moment On"
- Kenny Vaughn – baritone guitar, electric guitar
- Billy Joe Walker Jr. – acoustic guitar, electric guitar
- Cindy Richardson-Walker – background vocals
- Steve Wariner – background vocals
- Bryan White – lead vocals, background vocals
- Dennis Wilson – background vocals
- Lonnie Wilson – drums
- Glenn Worf – bass guitar, fuzz bass
- Curtis Young – background vocals

== Charts ==
Chart (2000)	Peak position
US Top Country Albums (Billboard)	25
