= Michael Severs =

- Genres: Country, Pop, Folk rock
- Occupations: Musician, Engineer, Producer
- Instrument: Guitar,
- Years active: 1980–present

Michael Severs (sometimes Mike Severs) is an American guitarist.

While living in Nashville, Severs has played on many Billboard 200/U.S. Billboard Top Country Albums-charting records. He has worked on many occasions with Leland Sklar, Brent Mason, Dave Pomeroy, Dan Dugmore, Paul Franklin, Glenn Worf, Jim Horn, Terry McMillan, Bruce Bouton and Pat Severs.

On Don McLean's 2009 album Addicted to Black, Severs also appeared as a producer, engineer, as well as a drum and keyboard programmer.

He has worked with some of the biggest names in music history, such as Dolly Parton, Rod Stewart, Alabama, Eric Church, Olivia Newton-John, Paul Simon, Steve Winwood, Felix Cavaliere, Tanya Tucker, Lynyrd Skynyrd and Brian Wilson.

== Discography ==
- 1980 - Dolly Parton - Dolly, Dolly, Dolly
- 1982 - Dolly Parton - Heartbreak Express
- 1983 - Dolly Parton - Burlap & Satin
- 1990 - Joe Diffie - A Thousand Winding Roads
- 1991 - Davis Daniel - Fighting Fire with Fire
- 1993 - Kieran Halpin - The Rite Hand
- 1993 - Sammy Kershaw - Haunted Heart
- 1994 - Davis Daniel - Davis Daniel
- 1995 - Confederate Railroad - When and Where
- 1996 - Gretchen Peters - The Secret of Life
- 1996 - Stephanie Bentley - Hopechest
- 1996 - Jeff Foxworthy - Crank It Up: The Music Album
- 1996 - Steve Wariner - No More Mr. Nice Guy
- 1997 - Raybon Brothers - Raybon Brothers
- 1997 - The Buffalo Club - The Buffalo Club
- 1998 - Lulu Roman - Intimate Expression
- 1999 - Marty Balin - Marty Balin Greatest Hits
- 2000 - Christafari - Dub, Sound, and Power
- 2002 - Chad Simmons - Heaven Sent
- 2004 - Cledus T. Judd - Bipolar and Proud
- 2008 - One Flew South - Last of the Good Guys
- 2008 - Olivia Newton-John - A Celebration in Song
- 2009 - Don McLean - Addicted to Black
- 2009 - Eric Church - Carolina

2014- Rod Stewart- Another Country
