= Bryan White (album) =

Studio album by Bryan White
- Released: October 11, 1994
- Recorded: 1994
- Studio: Nightingale and Sound Emporium (Nashville, Tennessee); Imagine Sound and The Dog House (Los Angeles, California)
- Genre: Country
- Length: 35:32
- Label: Asylum
- Producer: Kyle Lehning; Billy Joe Walker, Jr.

Bryan White chronology
Bryan White (1994)	Between Now and Forever (1996)

Singles from Bryan White
- 1. "Eugene You Genius" Released: September 19, 1994; 2. "Look at Me Now" Released: 1994; 3. "Someone Else's Star" Released: 1995; 4. "Rebecca Lynn" Released: 1995

Bryan White is the debut studio album by American country music artist Bryan White, released on October 11, 1994, on Asylum Records.

== Content ==
In order of release, these singles were "Eugene You Genius", "Look at Me Now", "Someone Else's Star", and "Rebecca Lynn"; the latter two songs were both Number One hits. The album peaked at No. 13 on the Billboard Top Country Albums charts and at No. 88 on the Billboard 200; it was certified platinum in the United States by the RIAA. Derek George, a former member of the band Pearl River, co-wrote the track "You Know How I Feel", in addition to singing background vocals.

"Someone Else's Star" was previously recorded by Davis Daniel on his 1994 album Davis Daniel. "Nothin' Less Than Love" was later recorded by The Buffalo Club on their 1997 self-titled album, from which it was released as a single that year. Neal McCoy also released "Going, Going, Gone" as a single from his 1996 self-titled album.

== Critical reception ==
Professional ratings
Review scores
Source	Rating
AllMusic	3/5 stars

Tom Lanham of New Country gave the album 3 out of 5 stars. He thought that the album showed promise despite White being only 20 at the time, and compared the stronger songs favorably to Vince Gill. He thought that "Eugene You Genius" showed a rockabilly influence and that "Look at Me Now" was "Eagles-ish", but said that "the astral-themed meanderings 'Me and the Moon' and 'Someone Else's Star' definitely turn off White's talented light."

== Track listing ==
Bryan White track listing
No.	Title	Writer(s)	Length
1.	"Eugene You Genius"	Lonnie Wilson; Billy Lawson	3:25
2.	"You Know How I Feel"	Bryan White; Derek George; Jim Weatherly	2:54
3.	"This Town"	Greg Barnhill; Jan Buckingham	4:00
4.	"Someone Else's Star"	Skip Ewing; Weatherly	3:21
5.	"Look at Me Now"	White; George; John Tirro	3:07
6.	"Rebecca Lynn"	Don Sampson; Ewing	3:57
7.	"Me and the Moon"	Tirro; Sam Gay	3:36
8.	"Nothin' Less Than Love"	Wayne Tester; Rusty Young	3:54
9.	"Going, Going, Gone"	Bob DiPiero; John Scott Sherrill; Steve Cropper	3:24
10.	"Helpless Heart"	Paul Brady	3:54
Total length:			35:32

== Personnel ==
Taken from the album booklet.

- Bryan White – lead vocals, backing vocals (2, 5, 9, 10)
- Kyle Lehning – Wurlitzer electric piano (1)
- Randy McCormick – keyboards (1, 4, 10), acoustic piano (3)
- Matt Rollings – acoustic piano (2, 4, 5, 7–10), organ (2, 4, 5, 7–10), keyboards (4, 6)
- Larry Byrom – acoustic guitar (1, 2, 5–8), electric guitar (1, 9, 10)
- Billy Joe Walker, Jr. – electric guitar (1, 4–10), acoustic guitar (3, 4, 6, 9)
- Biff Watson – acoustic guitar (1)
- Chris Leuzinger – electric guitar (2, 3, 5–10)
- Steve Gibson – electric guitar (3)
- Sonny Garrish – steel guitar (1, 3)
- Paul Franklin – steel guitar (2, 5, 7–9)
- Dan Dugmore – steel guitar (4, 6, 10)
- Bob Wray – bass guitar (1, 3)
- Glenn Worf – bass guitar (2, 4–10)
- Paul Leim – drums (1, 4, 6, 10)
- Lonnie Wilson – drums (2, 5, 7–9)
- Milton Sledge – drums (3)
- Terry McMillan – percussion (4, 6, 9)
- Hank Singer – fiddle (1)
- Stuart Duncan – fiddle (4–6)
- Michael Black – backing vocals (1, 3, 5, 7–9)
- John Wesley Ryles – backing vocals (1)
- Dennis Wilson – backing vocals (1, 3, 5–10)
- Derek George – backing vocals (2)
- Curtis Young – backing vocals (3, 6, 9, 10)
- Bruce Dees – backing vocals (10)
- Lisa Silver – backing vocals (10)
- Cindy Walker – backing vocals (10)

=== Production ===
- Kyle Lehning – producer
- Billy Joe Walker, Jr. – producer
- Joseph Bogan – recording
- Jeff Balding – recording
- Alan Schulman – overdub recording
- David Henson – recording assistant
- John Kunz – recording assistant
- Toby Seay – recording assistant, overdub recording assistant
- Ed Simonton – recording assistant
- Steve Tveit – recording assistant
- Neal Merrick – overdub recording assistant
- Bill Schnee – mixing at Morningstar Sound Studios (Hendersonville, Tennessee)
- Jason Lehning – mix assistant
- Kirt Odle – mix assistant
- Doug Sax – mastering at The Mastering Lab (Hollywood, California)
- Jason Stelluto – production assistant
- Peter Nash – photography
- Virginia Team – art direction
- Chris Ferrara – design

== Charts ==
=== Weekly charts ===
Chart (1994–1995)	Peak position
US Billboard 200	88
US Top Country Albums (Billboard)	13
US Heatseekers Albums (Billboard)	1

=== Year-end charts ===
1996 year-end chart performance for Bryan White
Chart (1996)	Peak position
US Top Country Albums (Billboard)	27

== Certifications ==
Region	Certification	Certified units/sales
United States (RIAA)	Platinum	1,000,000^{^}
^{^} Shipments figures based on certification alone.
