= No More Mr. Nice Guy (Steve Wariner album) =

Studio album by Steve Wariner
- Released: March 12, 1996
- Studio: The Bennett House, The Castle and Steve Wariner's studio (Franklin, Tennessee); Javelina Recording Studios (Nashville, Tennessee); Mac McAnally's house (Muscle Shoals, Alabama)
- Genre: Country
- Length: 42:17
- Label: Arista Nashville
- Producer: Steve Wariner

Steve Wariner chronology
Drive (1994)	No More Mr. Nice Guy (1996)	Burnin' the Roadhouse Down (1998)

No More Mr. Nice Guy is an instrumental album released in 1996 by American country music artist Steve Wariner. His final album for Arista Records, it comprises twelve instrumental tracks. No singles were released from it, although "The Brickyard Boogie" was nominated for Best Country Instrumental at the Grammy Awards of 1997. This song features former Pearl River member Derek George (who would later go on to found the band Williams Riley), former Boy Howdy member Jeffrey Steele, as well as Bryan White and Bryan Austin. Jimmy Olander, guitarist for Diamond Rio, is featured on the track "Hap Towne Breakdowne".

== Track listing ==
No.	Title	Writer(s)	Featured artist(s)	Length
1.	"No More Mr. Nice Guy"	Wariner; Randy Goodrum	Vince Gill and Nolan Ryan	4:04
2.	"Big Hero, Little Hero"	Wariner	Chet Atkins	4:34
3.	"Prelude / Practice Your Scales Somewhere Else"	Wariner	Mark O'Connor and Sam Bush	2:57
4.	"The Theme"	Wariner; Goodrum	Larry Carlton and Randy Goodrum	2:57
5.	"Forever Loving You"	Wariner		4:17
6.	"Next March"	Wariner; Goodrum	Béla Fleck	3:19
7.	"If You Can't Say Something Good"	Wariner; Mac McAnally	Mac McAnally	3:46
8.	"Hap Towne Breakdowne"	Wariner; Carl Jackson	Carl Jackson, Mark O'Connor, and Jimmy Olander (of Diamond Rio)	3:28
9.	"For Chester B"	Wariner		1:50
10.	"The Brickyard Boogie"	Wariner; Ron Gannaway	Bryan White, Derek George, Bryan Austin, and Jeffrey Steele	3:29
11.	"Don't Call Me Ray"	Wariner; Leo Kottke	Leo Kottke	3:09
12.	"Guitar Talk"	Wariner	Lee Roy Parnell and Richie Sambora	3:46

== Personnel ==
- Steve Wariner – electric guitar (1, 3–6, 9, 10–12), electric classical guitar (2), acoustic guitar (3, 7, 8), vocals (12)
- Randy Goodrum – keyboards (1, 3–6, 8), drum programming (6), Hammond B3 organ (12)
- Mitch Humphries – keyboards (2, 12)
- Vince Gill – electric guitar (1)
- Carl Jackson – acoustic guitar (1, 8)
- Chet Atkins – electric guitar (2)
- Michael Severs – electric guitar (2, 12)
- Sam Bush – mandolin (3)
- Larry Carlton – electric guitar (4)
- Béla Fleck – banjo (6)
- Mac McAnally – acoustic guitar (7)
- Jimmy Olander – electric guitar (8), guitar solo (8)
- Bryan Austin – electric guitar (10)
- Derek George – electric guitar (10)
- Leo Kottke – acoustic guitar (11)
- Lee Roy Parnell – slide guitar (12)
- Richie Sambora – electric guitar (12)
- David Hungate – bass (1, 3–5, 8)
- Dave Pomeroy – bass (2, 12)
- Woody Lingle – bass (6)
- Jeffrey Steele – bass (10)
- Paul Leim – drums (1, 3–5, 8)
- Ron Gannaway – drums (2, 12), snare drums (6)
- Bryan White – drums (10)
- Mark O'Connor – fiddle (3, 8)
- Nolan Ryan – voice over (1)

=== Production ===
- Steve Wariner – producer, overdub engineer
- Bill Deaton – tracking engineer (1–6, 8–12)
- Randy Gardner – tracking engineer (1–6, 8–12), overdub engineer, mixing
- Mac McAnally – tracking engineer (7)
- Don Cobb – digital editing
- Carlos Grier – digital editing
- Denny Purcell – mastering at Georgetown Masters (Nashville, Tennessee)
- Jonathan Russell – mastering assistant
- Ricky Sheaves – guitar technician
- Maude Gilman – art direction, design
- Ron Keith – photography
- Kevin Bonds – collage photography
- Joey Ruoto – collage photography
- Caryn Wariner – collage photography
- Gina Giglio – grooming
- Claudia Robertson Fowler – stylist
- Renaissance Management – management
