= Bryan Austin =

American singer-songwriter

- Born: Bryan Cuevas; September 12, 1967 (age 58)
- Origin: Pass Christian, Mississippi, U.S.
- Genres: Country
- Occupation: Singer
- Instruments: Vocals; electric guitar
- Years active: 1994, 2012
- Label: Patriot/Liberty
- Formerly of: Phoenix

Bryan Cuevas (born September 12, 1967) is an American country music artist, known professionally as Bryan Austin. Signed to Liberty Records' sister label Patriot Records in 1994, he released an album and two singles for the label. The first of these singles, "Radio Active", charted on the Billboard Hot Country Singles & Tracks (now Hot Country Songs) chart.

== Biography ==
Bryan Cuevas was born September 12, 1967 in Pass Christian, Mississippi. Cuevas was raised near Biloxi, Mississippi. In the late 1980s, he founded a band called Texas Flat, whose membership occasionally included Brett Favre, who would later become a quarterback for the Green Bay Packers.

Cuevas later changed his surname to Austin. In 1994, he was the first artist signed to Patriot Records, a sister label of Liberty Records founded by its then-president, Jimmy Bowen. He released his debut single, "Radio Active", that year. This song peaked at No. 62 on the U.S. Billboard country singles charts, and was included on his self-titled debut album, which was produced by Keith Stegall. Another single, "Is It Just Me", was also released and made into a music video,

Austin left Patriot in 1995 after the label was merged into Capitol Records. He performed on Steve Wariner's 1997 instrumental album No More Mr. Nice Guy on the track "The Brickyard Boogie." This track, which featured Bryan White, Jeffrey Steele and former Pearl River member Derek George, was nominated for Best Country Instrumental at the Grammy Awards of 1997. In 1999, Austin founded another band called Phoenix, whose members included Darin Anthony and Noah Gordon, the latter of whom was also signed as solo artist on Patriot in the 1990s.

On November 15, 2012, he released a new EP titled "Drunk on Love".

== Bryan Austin (1994) ==
Bryan Austin

Studio album by Bryan Austin
- Released: July 12, 1994
- Genre: Country
- Label: Patriot/Liberty
- Producer: Keith Stegall

=== Track listing ===
1. "Radio Active" (Bucky Jones, L. David Lewis, Kim Williams) – 3:20
2. "You're Right, I'm Wrong" (Wayne Perry, Marty Stuart) – 2:44
3. "That's What She Said" (Russ Roberts, Neil Thrasher, Williams) – 3:45
4. "Is It Just Me" (Kent Blazy, Thrasher) – 3:55
5. "Open Your Eyes" (Billy Kirsch, Fred Koller) – 3:03
6. "Long Walk Back" (Bryan Austin) – 3:04
7. "Susannah" (Gretchen Peters) – 3:31
8. "Limo Driver" (Austin, Roger Murrah, Keith Stegall) – 3:18
9. "That Makes One of Us" (Austin, Stegall, Gary Harrison) – 3:40
10. "All Dressed Up with No Place to Go" (Austin, James Dean Hicks) – 2:41

=== Personnel ===
- Bryan Austin - electric guitar, lead vocals, background vocals
- Eddie Bayers - drums
- Bruce Bouton - steel guitar
- Terri Clark - background vocals
- Stuart Duncan - fiddle
- Paul Franklin - steel guitar
- Dennis Henson - background vocals
- John Kelton - acoustic guitar
- Brent Mason - electric guitar
- Gary Prim - keyboards, piano
- Hargus "Pig" Robbins - piano
- Keith Stegall - acoustic guitar
- Biff Watson - acoustic guitar
- Glenn Worf - bass guitar

=== Singles ===
Year	Single	Peak positions
Year	Single	US Country
1994	"Radio Active"	62
1994	"Is It Just Me"	—
"—" denotes releases that did not chart

=== Music videos ===
Year	Video	Director
1994	"Radio Active"	Steven Goldmann
1994	"Is It Just Me"	
