= Nothin' Less Than Love =

Single by The Buffalo Club

from the album The Buffalo Club
- Released: June 7, 1997
- Genre: Country
- Length: 3:59
- Label: Rising Tide
- Songwriters: Wayne Tester; Rusty Young
- Producer: Barry Beckett

The Buffalo Club singles chronology
"If She Don't Love You" (1997)	"Nothin' Less Than Love" (1997)	"Heart Hold On" (1997)

"Nothin' Less Than Love" is a song written by Wayne Tester and Rusty Young. It was originally recorded by American country music artist Bryan White on his 1994 self-titled album. It was later recorded by American country music group The Buffalo Club. It was released in June 1997 as the second single from the album The Buffalo Club. The song reached number 26 on the Billboard Hot Country Singles & Tracks chart.

== Critical reception ==
A review of the single in Billboard was favorable, stating that the song "is marked by soaring vocals, a strong pop hook, and a well-crafted lyric".

== Chart performance ==
Chart (1997)	Peak position
US Hot Country Songs (Billboard)	26
Canadian RPM Country Tracks	42
