= For Crying Out Loud =

For Crying Out Loud may refer to:

- For Crying Out Loud (album), a 2017 album by Kasabian
- For Cryin' Out Loud!, a 2024 album by Finneas
- "For Crying Out Loud" (song), a 1991 song by Davis Daniel
- "For Crying Out Loud", song by The 77s from Drowning with Land in Sight
- "For Crying Out Loud", song by Anita Cochran
- "For Crying Out Loud", song by Meat Loaf from Bat Out of Hell
- For Crying Out Loud, 1950s stage show with Irene Champlin

== See also ==
- "Crying Out Loud", an episode of Modern Family
