= Bad Day to Let You Go =

Single by Bryan White

from the album The Right Place
- Released: April 11, 1998
- Genre: Country
- Length: 4:26
- Label: Asylum
- Songwriters: Bryan White; Bob DiPiero; Derek George
- Producers: Billy Joe Walker Jr.; Kyle Lehning

Bryan White singles chronology
| "One Small Miracle" (1997) | "Bad Day to Let You Go" (1998) | "Tree of Hearts" (1998) |

"Bad Day to Let You Go" is a song co-written and recorded by American country music artist Bryan White. It was released in April 1998 as the third single from the album The Right Place. The song reached No. 30 on the Billboard Hot Country Singles & Tracks chart. The song was written by White, Bob DiPiero and Derek George.

== Chart performance ==
| Chart (1998) | Peak position |
|---|---|
| US Hot Country Songs (Billboard) | 30 |
| Canadian RPM Country Tracks | 23 |
