= Fight Fire with Fire =

Fight Fire with Fire may refer to:

- "Fight Fire with Fire" (Kansas song)
- "Fight Fire with Fire" (Metallica song)
- "Fight Fire with Fire", a 1987 single by Mai Tai
- "Fight Fire with Fire" (The Prodigy song)

Fighting Fire with Fire may refer to:

- Fighting Fire with Fire, an album by Davis Daniel, or its title track
- "Fighting Fire with Fire" (Arrow), an episode of Arrow
- "Fight Fire With Fire", an episode of the 2019 Indian TV series Bard of Blood

Fire with Fire may refer to:

- Fire with Fire (1986 film), a romantic drama film starring Craig Sheffer and Virginia Madsen
- "Fire with Fire", a 1986 single by Wild Blue featured in the above film of the same name
- Fire with Fire (2012 film), an action film starring Joshua Duhamel, Rosario Dawson, and Bruce Willis
- Fire with Fire, a 2013 book by Charles Gannon
- "Fire with Fire" (song), a song by the Scissor Sisters from Night Work
- "Fire with Fire" (Gossip song)
- Fire with Fire, a 1993 feminist book by Naomi Wolf

== See also ==
- Controlled burn
