= Between Now and Forever =

Studio album by Bryan White
- Released: March 26, 1996
- Recorded: 1995
- Studios: Nightingale, Woodland, Montclair Manor, The Compound (Nashville, Tennessee)
- Genre: Country
- Length: 32:50
- Label: Asylum
- Producers: Kyle Lehning; Billy Joe Walker, Jr.

Bryan White chronology
Bryan White (1994)	Between Now and Forever (1996)	The Right Place (1997)

Singles from Between Now and Forever
- 1. "I'm Not Supposed to Love You Anymore" Released: February 26, 1996; 2. "So Much for Pretending" Released: June 24, 1996; 3. "That's Another Song" Released: October 7, 1996; 4. "Sittin' On Go" Released: February 24, 1997

Between Now and Forever is the second studio album by American country music artist Bryan White. It was released on March 26, 1996, via Asylum Records. White continued work with the same producers from his debut studio album, Kyle Lehning and Billy Joe Walker Jr.. White co-wrote four of the album's ten tracks. He described the album as more mature, believable, and energetic than his previous album.

The album received a favorable reception from music critics. It was also a commercial success on both the singles and albums charts. It peaked at number 7 on the US Top Country Albums chart, becoming his first top-ten album on the chart. Three of its four singles cracked the top ten of the US Billboard Hot Country Songs chart, including the number one singles "So Much for Pretending" (which he co-wrote) and "Sittin' on Go", the former becoming his fourth and final number one single to date.

The album has been certified platinum by the Recording Industry Association of America (RIAA) for shipments of one million copies. It is his most successful record to date.

== Critical reception ==
Billboard's Chet Flippo gave the album a positive review writing, "He's got a voice older than his years, a brilliant song sense, and, most important, he understands what country music is all about. It doesn't hurt that he's also a good writer."

Professional ratings
Review scores
Source	Rating
Allmusic	link
Entertainment Weekly	C link

== Track listing ==
Between Now and Forever track listing
No.	Title	Writer(s)	Length
1.	"Sittin' on Go"	Josh Leo; Rick Bowles	3:08
2.	"Still Life"	Mac McAnally	3:13
3.	"Blindhearted"	Bryan White; Randy Goodrum	3:14
4.	"Nickel in the Well"	Chris Waters; Lonnie Wilson	3:20
5.	"I'm Not Supposed to Love You Anymore"	Skip Ewing; Donny Kees	3:43
6.	"So Much for Pretending"	White; Derek George; John Tirro	2:32
7.	"Between Now and Forever"	White; Don Prfimmer; George Teren	3:17
8.	"A Hundred and One"	Rich Wayland; Kye Fleming; Mary Ann Kennedy	3:29
9.	"On Any Given Night"	White; Allison Mellon; Jeff Ross	3:43
10.	"That's Another Song"	John Paul Daniel; Monty Powell; Doug Pincock; Jule Medders	3:11
Total length:			32:50

== Personnel ==
Taken from the album booklet.

- Bryan White – lead vocals, backIng vocals (1, 6, 8–10)
- Steve Nathan – organ (1, 8, 10), keyboards (3, 5, 7–10), acoustic piano solo (3), acoustic piano (5)
- John Hobbs – keyboards (2, 8, 10), organ (8, 10)
- Randy McCormick – acoustic piano (2–4, 7–10)
- Hargus "Pig" Robbins – electric piano (6)
- Billy Joe Walker, Jr. – acoustic guitar (1–5, 7–10), electric guitar (6, 9)
- Brent Mason – electric guitar (1–5, 7–10)
- Derek George – acoustic guitar (6), backing vocals (6, 9)
- Dann Huff – electric guitar (6, 9)
- Chris Leuzinger – electric guitar (6)
- Paul Franklin – pedal steel guitar (1, 2, 5, 8–10)
- Stuart Duncan – mandolin (2, 4, 10), fiddle (2, 4, 10)
- Sonny Garrish – pedal steel guitar (3, 7), dobro (4)
- Dan Dugmore – lap steel guitar (6, 9)
- Glenn Worf – bass (1–5, 7–10), fuzz bass (1)
- Mike Brignardello – bass (6)
- Eddie Bayers – drums (1, 2, 5, 7–10), percussion (1, 2, 5, 7–10)
- Paul Leim – drums (3, 4, 6), percussion (3, 4, 6)
- John Wesley Ryles – backing vocals (1–5, 7, 10)
- Dennis Wilson – backing vocals (1–5, 7, 10)
- Curtis Young – backing vocals (1–5, 7, 10)

=== Production ===
- Kyle Lehning – producer, overdub recording
- Billy Joe Walker, Jr. – producer
- Joseph Bogan – recording
- Kevin Beamish – recording
- Alan Schulman – recording, overdub recording
- Clark Hagan – overdub recording
- Chris Bogan – recording assistant
- Marc Frigo – recording assistant
- Mark Hagan – recording assistant
- Jason Lehning – recording assistant, overdub recording, remixing (6)
- Steve Lowery – recording assistant
- Chris Stone – recording assistant
- Bill Schnee – mixing at Seventeen Grand Recording (Nashville, Tennessee)
- Marshall Morgan – remixing (6)
- Doug Sax – mastering at The Mastering Lab (Hollywood, California)
- Jason Stelluto – production assistant
- Virginia Team – art direction
- Team Design – design
- Mark Tucker – photography
- Marty Gamblin – management
- Stan Schneider – management

== Charts ==
=== Weekly charts ===
Weekly chart performance for Between Now and Forever
Chart (1996)	Peak position
Canadian Country Albums (RPM)	3
US Billboard 200	52
US Top Country Albums (Billboard)	7

=== Year-end charts ===
1996 year-end chart performance for Between Now and Forever
Chart (1996)	Position
Canadian Country Albums (RPM)	13
US Billboard 200	153
US Top Country Albums (Billboard)	25

1997 year-end chart performance for Between Now and Forever
Chart (1997)	Position
Canadian Country Albums (RPM)	42
US Top Country Albums (Billboard)	21

== Certifications ==
Certifications for The Woman in Me
Region	Certification	Certified units/sales
Canada (Music Canada)	Gold	50,000^{^}
United States (RIAA)	Platinum	1,000,000^{^}
^{^} Shipments figures based on certification alone.
