= You're Still Beautiful to Me =

Single by Bryan White

from the album How Lucky I Am
- B-side: "Shari Ann"
- Released: June 19, 1999
- Genre: Country
- Length: 5:14
- Label: Asylum
- Songwriters: Bryan Adams; Robert John "Mutt" Lange
- Producers: Bryan White; Derek George

Bryan White singles chronology
"Tree of Hearts" (1998)	"You're Still Beautiful to Me" (1999)	"God Gave Me You" (1999)

"You're Still Beautiful to Me" is a song written by Bryan Adams and Robert John "Mutt" Lange and recorded by Adams for his 1996 studio album 18 til I Die. The song was covered by American country music artist Bryan White and released in June 1999 as the first single from his album How Lucky I Am. The song reached number 39 on the Billboard Hot Country Singles & Tracks chart.

== Chart performance ==
Chart (1999)	Peak position
US Hot Country Songs (Billboard)	39
Canadian RPM Country Tracks	23
