= Your Memory Wins Again =

Single by Skip Ewing

from the album The Coast of Colorado
- B-side: "Burnin' a Hole in My Heart
- Released: March 5, 1988
- Genre: Country
- Length: 3:08
- Label: MCA
- Songwriter(s): Skip Ewing, Mike Geiger, Woody Mullis
- Producer(s): Jimmy Bowen, Skip Ewing

Skip Ewing singles chronology
"Your Memory Wins Again" (1988)	"I Don't Have Far to Fall" (1988)

"Your Memory Wins Again" is a debut song co-written and recorded by American country music artist Skip Ewing. It was released in March 1988 as the first single from the album The Coast of Colorado. The song reached #17 on the Billboard Hot Country Singles & Tracks chart. Ewing wrote the song with Mike Geiger and Woody Mullis.

== Chart performance ==
Chart (1988)	Peak position
US Hot Country Songs (Billboard)	17
