= The Right Place =

Studio album by Bryan White
- Released: September 23, 1997
- Recorded: 1996–1997
- Studio: Emerald Sound, Woodland Sound Studios, Seventeen Grand Studios and Ocean Way Nashville (Nashville, Tennessee); Schnee Studios (North Hollywood, California); The Recording Club and The Compound Studio (Los Angeles, California)
- Genre: Country
- Length: 37:46
- Label: Asylum
- Producer: Kyle Lehning Billy Joe Walker, Jr.

Bryan White chronology
Between Now and Forever (1996)	The Right Place (1997)	How Lucky I Am (1999)

Professional ratings
Review scores
Source	Rating
Allmusic	link

The Right Place is the third studio album by American country music artist Bryan White. It was released in 1997 (see 1997 in country music) on Asylum Records. The album produced four chart singles on the Billboard Hot Country Singles & Tracks (now Hot Country Songs) charts. In order of release, these were "Love Is the Right Place", "One Small Miracle", "Bad Day to Let You Go", and "Tree of Hearts", which respectively reached numbers 4, 16, 30, and 45. "Bad Day to Let You Go" also overlapped with White's guest appearance on Shania Twain's 1998 single "From This Moment On".

== Track listing ==
No.	Title	Writer(s)	Length
1.	"Love Is the Right Place"	Marcus Hummon, Tommy Sims	3:15
2.	"What Did I Do (To Deserve You)"	Jamie Houston, Andy Goldmark, James Dean Hicks	4:11
3.	"Never Get Around to It"	Bryan White, Derek George	2:42
4.	"Leave My Heart Out of This"	Skip Ewing, Bob DiPiero	4:00
5.	"The Natural Thing"	Allyson Taylor, Larry Byrom	4:18
6.	"One Small Miracle"	Bill Anderson, Steve Wariner	3:52
7.	"Tree of Hearts"	Ewing, Don Sampson	3:46
8.	"We Could Have Been"	Don Cook, John Barlow Jarvis	3:27
9.	"Bad Day to Let You Go"	White, George, DiPiero	4:26
10.	"Call Me Crazy"	White, George, John Tirro	3:49

== Personnel ==
- Bryan White – lead vocals, backing vocals (1–3, 5, 10), acoustic guitar (3), drums (10), suspended cymbal (10)
- Dennis Burnside – electric piano (1)
- Steve Nathan – Wurlitzer electric piano (1), Hammond B3 organ (1–3, 5, 9), keyboards (2, 7, 8), acoustic piano (4, 6, 10), clavinet (9)
- Larry Byrom – electric guitar (1, 5), gut-string guitar (2), acoustic guitar (4, 6–10)
- Mark Casstevens – acoustic guitar (1)
- Billy Joe Walker, Jr. – acoustic guitar (1, 2, 6, 7), gut-string guitar (4)
- Derek George – acoustic guitar (3, 9), electric guitar (3, 10), echoplex (3), backing vocals (3, 9, 10)
- Paul Franklin – steel guitar
- Sonny Garrish – pedabro (7)
- Brent Mason – 6-string bass (1), electric bass solo (1), electric guitar (2, 4–10)
- Michael Rhodes – bass (1, 2, 4, 6, 8, 10)
- Glenn Worf – bass (3, 5, 7, 9)
- Lonnie Wilson – drums (1, 3, 7, 9)
- Paul Leim – drums (2, 4, 6)
- Eddie Bayers – drums (5, 8)
- Tom Roady – percussion (2, 3, 10)
- Aubrey Haynie – fiddle (6, 7), mandolin (7)
- Bekka Bramlett – backing vocals (1)
- Mac McAnally – backing vocals (2)
- Dennis Wilson – backing vocals (2, 4, 5, 7, 8)
- Curtis Young – backing vocals (4, 8)
- Neil Thrasher – backing vocals (5)
- Liana Manis – backing vocals (6)
- Steve Wariner – backing vocals (6)
- Harry Stinson – backing vocals (7)

=== Production ===
- Kyle Lehning – producer, mixing
- Billy Joe Walker, Jr. – producer
- Kevin Bemish – recording engineer
- Steve Tillisch – recording engineer
- Derek Bason – assistant engineer
- Brian Hardin – assistant engineer
- Amy Hughes Frigo – assistant engineer
- Jason Lehning – overdub engineer, mix assistant
- Marty McClantoc – overdub engineer
- Koji Egawa – assistant overdub engineer
- Chris Mara – assistant overdub engineer
- Sally Jenkins – mix assistant
- Glenn Spinner – mix assistant
- Doug Sax – mastering at The Mastering Lab (Hollywood, California)
- Marla Burns – production coordinator
- Virginia Team – art direction
- Chris Ferrara – design
- Matthew Barnes – photography
- Ron Davis – photography
- Marty Gamblin – management
- Stan Schneider – management

== Charts ==
=== Weekly charts ===
Chart (1997)	Peak position
Canadian Country Albums (RPM)	15
US Billboard 200	41
US Top Country Albums (Billboard)	7

=== Year-end charts ===
Chart (1997)	Position
US Top Country Albums (Billboard)	70
Chart (1998)	Position
US Top Country Albums (Billboard)	42

== Certifications ==
Region	Certification	Certified units/sales
United States (RIAA)	Gold	500,000^{^}
^{^} Shipments figures based on certification alone.
