= The Gospel According to Luke (song) =

1989 single by Skip Ewing

Single by Skip Ewing

from the album The Coast of Colorado
- B-side: "Dad"
- Released: February 1989
- Genre: Country
- Length: 3:43
- Label: MCA
- Songwriters: Skip Ewing, Don Sampson
- Producers: Jimmy Bowen, Skip Ewing

Skip Ewing singles chronology
"Burnin' a Hole in My Heart" (1988)	"The Gospel According to Luke" (1989)	"The Coast of Colorado" (1989)

"The Gospel According to Luke" is a song co-written and recorded by American country music artist Skip Ewing. It was released in February 1989 as the fourth single from the album The Coast of Colorado. The song reached number 10 on the Billboard Hot Country Singles & Tracks chart. The song was by Ewing and Don Sampson.

== Content ==
The song is about a young man who meets a homeless man named Luke. Despite his haggard appearance, strong odor from not having bathed or showered, and rough voice, he is adept at interpreting and preaching the Bible, particularly Gospel of Luke in the New Testament. The man offers to buy Luke breakfast, to which he is thankful.

A few days later, the two meet again, this time at a mission. Luke is seen giving the meager change he had collected during the past week, explaining that the needs of the mission and helping others were more important than his own wants or needs. In essence, the young man had witnessed a modern-day version of the lesson of the widow's mite (as told in both Luke 21:1-4 and Mark 12:41-44), where an elderly widow gives two mites -- the smallest Roman coin, implied to be her entire net worth -- to the offering and that the giving was in true sacrifice.

== Chart performance ==
Chart (1989)	Peak position
Canada Country Singles (RPM)	11
US Hot Country Songs (Billboard)	10
