= I Don't Have Far to Fall =

Single by Skip Ewing

from the album The Coast of Colorado
- B-side: "Still Under the Weather"
- Released: August 1988
- Genre: Country
- Length: 3:28
- Label: MCA
- Songwriters: Skip Ewing, Don Sampson
- Producers: Jimmy Bowen, Skip Ewing

Skip Ewing singles chronology
"Your Memory Wins Again" (1988)	"I Don't Have Far to Fall" (1988)	"Burnin' a Hole in My Heart" (1988)

"I Don't Have Far to Fall" is a song co-written and recorded by American country music artist Skip Ewing. It was released in August 1988 as the second single from the album The Coast of Colorado. The song reached number 8 on the Billboard Hot Country Singles & Tracks chart. Ewing wrote the song with Don Sampson.

== Music video ==
The music video was directed by Jim May and premiered in mid-1988.

== Charts ==
=== Weekly charts ===
Chart (1988)	Peak position
US Hot Country Songs (Billboard)	8
Canadian RPM Country Tracks	34

=== Year-end charts ===
Chart (1988)	Position
US Hot Country Songs (Billboard)	54
