= Someone Else's Star =

Single by Bryan White

from the album Bryan White
- B-side: "This Town"
- Released: May 22, 1995
- Recorded: 1994
- Genre: Country
- Length: 3:21
- Label: Asylum
- Songwriters: Skip Ewing; Jim Weatherly
- Producers: Billy Joe Walker Jr.; Kyle Lehning

Bryan White singles chronology
"Look at Me Now" (1995)	"Someone Else's Star" (1995)	"Rebecca Lynn" (1995)

"Someone Else's Star" is a song written by Skip Ewing and Jim Weatherly, and was first recorded by Davis Daniel on his self-titled second album in 1994, but then was recorded by American country music singer Bryan White. It was released in May 1995 as the third single from his self-titled debut album. The song was White's first number one on the Billboard Hot Country Singles & Tracks (now Hot Country Songs) chart.

== Content ==
The song's narrator is a male character who laments his inability to find someone with whom he can fall in love. He then assumes that others are getting what he is wishing for because he is "wishing on someone else's star".

== Chart performance ==
White's version of the song debuted at number 60 on the Hot Country Songs chart dated May 27, 1995. It charted for twenty weeks on that chart, and reached number one on the chart dated September 9, 1995, where it remained for one week, also giving White his first number one single.

=== Charts ===
Chart (1995)	Peak position
Canada Country Singles (RPM)	5
US Bubbling Under Hot 100 (Billboard)	12
US Hot Country Songs (Billboard)	1

=== Year-end charts ===
Chart (1995)	Position
Canada Country Tracks (RPM)	83
US Country Songs (Billboard)	75
