= How Lucky I Am =

Studio album by Bryan White
- Released: August 24, 1999
- Studios: Emerald Entertainment, Sound Kitchen, The Music Mill, Schmoeland Studios, The Compound, Ocean Way Nashville, and Javelina Studios (Nashville, Tennessee)
- Genre: Country
- Length: 43:58
- Label: Asylum
- Producers: Derek George Dann Huff Bryan White

Bryan White chronology
The Right Place (1997)	How Lucky I Am (1999)	Greatest Hits (2000)

How Lucky I Am is the fourth studio album by American country music artist Bryan White. It was released on August 24, 1999 through Asylum Records. The album spawned two singles: "You're Still Beautiful to Me" and "God Gave Me You", both reached No. 39 and No. 40 on the Billboard Hot Country Songs chart, respectively. Dann Huff produced tracks 1–3 and 6–8, and White co-produced the remainder of the album with Derek George.

Stephen Thomas Erlewine gave the album three stars out of five, with his review saying that its sound was "more suited for adult contemporary stations than contemporary country" but adding that the album worked "in small doses".

== Track listing ==
No.	Title	Writer(s)	Length
1.	"Everywhere I Turn"	Bruce Miller, James LeBlanc	3:52
2.	"Heaven Sent"	Tim DuBois, Mike Reid	3:52
3.	"The Stayin'"	Scotty Emerick, John Tirro, Derek George	2:48
4.	"You're Still Beautiful to Me"	Bryan Adams, Robert John "Mutt" Lange	5:14
5.	"That Good"	Andy Goldmark, James Dean Hicks, Jamie Houston	4:17
6.	"Love Me Like You Mean It"	Bryan White, George, Tirro	3:29
7.	"God Gave Me You"	Goldmark, Hicks, Houston	4:06
8.	"Love Happens Just Like That"	Tim Nichols, Annie Roboff	2:47
9.	"Shari Ann"	White, Max Carl	3:47
10.	"Two in a Million"	Tim Mensy, Gary Harrison	2:40
11.	"How Lucky I Am"	Marcus Hummon, Roboff	3:04
12.	"You'll Always Be Loved (By Me)"	White, George, Tirro	4:00

== Personnel ==
- Bryan White – lead vocals, backing vocals (2, 3, 5, 7, 9–12), acoustic guitar (4, 9, 10), percussion (4, 10, 12), shaker (5), cowbell (9), tambourine (9)
- Matt Rollings – keyboards (1, 2)
- Steve Nathan – keyboards (2, 6–8), acoustic piano (5, 10–12), Hammond B3 organ (11)
- Tim Akers – keyboards (3, 6, 7, 8)
- Tom Bentley – acoustic piano (4, 9), Rhodes piano (4, 5), Hammond B3 organ (4, 5), keyboards (10, 12), Mellotron strings (10)
- Max Carl – backing vocals (4, 9), Wurlitzer electric piano (9), Hammond B3 organ (9)
- B. James Lowry – acoustic guitar (1–3, 6–8)
- Dann Huff – electric guitar (1–3, 6–8)
- Jeff King – electric guitar (1–3, 6–8)
- Derek George – acoustic guitar (4), Mu-tron guitar (4), Rickenbacker guitar (4), backing vocals (5, 10–12), all electric guitars (9), electric guitar (10, 12), 12-string electric guitar (11)
- Brinson Strickland – electric guitar (4)
- Steve Wariner – 12-string acoustic guitar (4)
- Larry Byrom – acoustic guitar (5, 10, 11)
- Brent Mason – electric guitar (5, 10, 11)
- Chris Leuzinger – electric guitar (12)
- Mac McAnally – gut-string acoustic guitar (12)
- Paul Franklin – steel guitar (1–3, 5–8, 10–12)
- Randle Currie – steel guitar (4, 9)
- Mike Brignardello – bass (1–3, 6–8)
- Lee Hendricks – bass (4, 5, 9–12)
- Paul Leim – drums (1–3, 6–8)
- Lynn Williams – drums (4, 9)
- Lonnie Wilson – drums (5, 10, 11), shaker (11), tambourine (11), loops (12)
- Eric Darken – percussion (1–3, 6–8)
- Joe Finger – percussion (4), additional percussion (11), djembe (11), udu (11), drums (12)
- Aubrey Haynie – fiddle (1–3, 6–8)
- Stuart Duncan – fiddle (4, 9, 10, 12), mandolin (9)
- Ronn Huff – string arrangements (2, 7)
- Bergen White – string arrangements (5, 12)
- Carl Gorodetzky – string contractor (2, 5, 7, 12)
- The Nashville String Machine – strings (2, 5, 7, 12)
- Chris Rodriguez – backing vocals (1, 3, 6–8)
- Scotty Emerick – backing vocals (5, 10)
- Harry Stinson – backing vocals (9)
- Erika Page – "Shari Ann" vocals (9)
- John Tirro – backing vocals (10)

Party vibe on "Shari Ann"

- Joe Finger, Paul Hantzis, Lee Hendricks, Leslie Liddell, Erika Page, Brinson Strickland and Bryan White

BW Tribe on "How Lucky I Am "

- Tom Bentley, Joe Finger, Paul Hantzis and Bryan White

=== Production ===
- Susan Nadler – A&R direction
- Dann Huff – producer (1–3, 6–8)
- Bryan White – producer (4, 5, 9–12), additional recording (4, 5, 9–12)
- Derek George – producer (4, 5, 9–12), recording (4, 5, 9), digital editing (4, 5, 9–12), overdub recording (10–12)
- Jeff Balding – recording (1–3, 6–8), mixing (1–3, 6–8)
- Kenny Farris – recording assistant (1–3, 6–8), mix assistant (1–3, 6–8)
- Mark Hagen – recording assistant (1–3, 6–8), additional recording (1–3, 6–8), mix assistant (1–3, 6–8)
- Paul Hantzis – additional recording (4, 5, 9–12), digital editing (4, 5, 9–12)
- Jason Lehning – additional recording (4, 5, 9–12), string recording (5, 12)
- Steve Lowery – additional recording (4, 5, 9–12), overdub recording (10)
- Alan Schulman – additional recording (4, 5, 9–12), recording (10–12)
- Chris Stone – additional recording (4, 5, 9–12), recording assistant (10–12)
- Kyle Lehning – mixing (4, 5, 9–12)
- Joe Costa – mix assistant (4, 5, 9–12)
- Sandy Jenkins – mix assistant (4, 5, 9–12)
- Doug Sax – mastering at The Mastering Lab (Hollywood, California)
- Mike "Frog" Griffith – production assistant (1–3, 6–8)
- Valerie Main – production assistant (4, 5, 9–12)
- Andrew Eccles – photography
- Michael Hagewood – art direction
- Laura LiPuma-Nash – art direction, design
- Trish Townsend – stylist

== Chart performance ==
Chart (1999)	Peak position
U.S. Billboard Top Country Albums	7
U.S. Billboard 200	81
