= The Coast of Colorado (song) =

Single by Skip Ewing

from the album The Coast of Colorado
- B-side: "Dad"
- Released: June 24, 1989
- Genre: Country
- Length: 3:50
- Label: MCA
- Songwriters: Skip Ewing, Max D. Barnes
- Producers: Jimmy Bowen, Skip Ewing

Skip Ewing singles chronology
"The Gospel According to Luke" (1989)	"The Coast of Colorado" (1989)	"It's You Again" (1989)

"The Coast of Colorado" is a song co-written and recorded by American country music artist Skip Ewing. It was released in June 1989 as the fifth single and title track from the album The Coast of Colorado. The song reached #15 on the Billboard Hot Country Singles & Tracks chart. Ewing wrote the song with Max D. Barnes.

== Chart performance ==
Chart (1989)	Peak position
Canada Country Singles (RPM)	24
US Hot Country Songs (Billboard)	15
