= I Know a Place (Davis Daniel album) =

Studio album by Davis Daniel
- Released: June 18, 1996
- Genre: Country
- Label: A&M
- Producer: Harold Shedd, Ed Seay

Davis Daniel chronology
Davis Daniel (1994)	I Know a Place (1996)

Professional ratings
Review scores
Source	Rating
Allmusic	4/5 stars

I Know a Place is the third and final studio album by American country music artist Davis Daniel. Its only single was its title track, which failed to chart. This was also Daniel's only album for the A&M Records label, which would close its country division shortly after the album's release.

== Track listing ==
1. "I Know a Place" (Tommy Lee James, Harry Stinson) - 3:35
2. "I'm Not Listening Anymore" (Debbie Zavitson, Russ Zavitson) - 3:41
3. "It's Been a Pleasure (Not Knowing You)" (Randy Archer) - 3:33
4. "Better Half of My Heart" (Davis Daniel, Tom Laffey, Elbert West) - 3:18
5. "What I Wouldn't Give" (J.P. Pennington, Troy Seals) - 3:37
6. "Ruth Ann" (Jimmy Alan Stewart, Al Carmichael, Gary Griffin) - 3:30
7. "My Heart's Not in It" (Monty Powell, Debi Cochran, John Paul Daniel) - 3:14
8. "Beer and Money" (D. Daniel, Chris Paul) - 2:50
9. "From Where I Stand" (Freddy Weller, Ricky John Holt) - 3:24
10. "Here's Lookin' at You" (D. Daniel, Tom Laffey) - 3:35

== Personnel ==
- Eddie Bayers - drums
- Joe Chemay - bass guitar
- Dan Dugmore - electric guitar, steel guitar
- Larry Franklin - fiddle, mandolin
- Paul Franklin - steel guitar
- John Hobbs - synthesiser, piano, clavinet, wah-wah clavinet
- Dann Huff - bass guitar, 6-string bass guitar, electric guitar, gut string guitar
- Paul Leim - drums
- Anthony Martin - synthesizer, wah-wah technician, background vocals
- Steve Nathan - synthesizer, piano, Hammond organ
- Michael Rhodes - bass guitar
- John Wesley Ryles - background vocals
- Russell Terrell - background vocals
- Billy Joe Walker, Jr. - acoustic guitar, electric guitar
- Biff Watson - acoustic guitar
- Dennis Wilson - background vocals
- Curtis Young - background vocals
