= The Will to Love =

Studio album by Skip Ewing
- Released: September 19, 1989
- Genre: Country
- Length: 34:24
- Label: MCA
- Producer: Jimmy Bowen, Skip Ewing

Skip Ewing chronology
The Coast of Colorado (1988)	The Will to Love (1989)	A Healin' Fire (1990)

The Will to Love is the second studio album by American country music artist Skip Ewing. It was released on September 19, 1990, via MCA Records. The album includes the singles "It's You Again" and "If a Man Could Live on Love Alone".

== Track listing ==
No.	Title	Writer(s)	Length
1.	"The Will to Love"	Skip Ewing, Don Sampson	3:13
2.	"Please Don't Leave Me Now"	Ewing, Sampson	4:12
3.	"If a Man Could Live on Love Alone"	Ewing, Red Lane	3:22
4.	"Karen"	Ewing, Sampson	3:37
5.	"The Door"	Ewing, Lane	3:43
6.	"It Wasn't His Child"	Ewing	3:42
7.	"It's You Again"	Ewing, Mike Geiger, Woody Mullis	3:00
8.	"Age Doesn't Matter at All"	Ewing	4:03
9.	"Ain't That the Way It Always Ends"	Ewing, Sampson	2:48
10.	"She's Makin' Plans"	Ewing	2:42

== Personnel ==
Adapted from liner notes.

- Garry Anderson - background vocals
- Max T. Barnes - background vocals
- John Catchings - cello
- Jerry Douglas - dobro
- Skip Ewing - lead vocals, background vocals, classical electric guitar on "The Will to Love", acoustic guitar on "It Wasn't His Child", Third Hand on mandolin
- Mike Geiger - background vocals
- Hoot Hester - mandolin
- Michael Fisher - percussion
- Mike Lawler - synthesizer
- Claire Lynch - background vocals
- Rick Marotta - drums
- Woody Mullis - background vocals
- Steve Nathan - synthesizer
- Matt Rollings - piano
- Leland Sklar - bass guitar
- Billy Joe Walker Jr. - acoustic guitar
- Curtis "Mr. Harmony" Young - background vocals
- Liana Young - background vocals
- Reggie Young - electric guitar

== Chart performance ==
Chart (1989)	Peak position
US Top Country Albums (Billboard)	44
