= It's You Again (Skip Ewing song) =

Single by Skip Ewing

from the album The Will to Love
- B-side: "Ain't That the Way It Always Ends"
- Released: October 1989
- Genre: Country
- Length: 3:02
- Label: MCA
- Songwriters: Skip Ewing, Mike Geiger, Woody Mullis
- Producers: Jimmy Bowen, Skip Ewing

Skip Ewing singles chronology
"The Coast of Colorado" (1989)	"It's You Again" (1989)	"If a Man Could Live on Love Alone" (1990)

"It's You Again" is a song co-written and recorded by American country music artist Skip Ewing. It was released in October 1989 as the first single from the album The Will to Love. The song reached number 5 on the Billboard Hot Country Singles & Tracks chart. The song was written Ewing, Mike Geiger and Woody Mullis.

The B-side, "Ain't That the Way It Always Ends", was later covered by Tim McGraw on his 1997 album Everywhere.

== Chart performance ==
Chart (1989–1990)	Peak position
Canada Country Singles (RPM)	9
US Hot Country Songs (Billboard)	5

=== Year-end charts ===
Chart (1990)	Position
Canada Country Tracks (RPM)	90
US Country Songs (Billboard)	53
