= God Gave Me You (Bryan White song) =

Single by Bryan White

from the album How Lucky I Am
- Released: October 23, 1999
- Recorded: 1999
- Genre: Country
- Length: 4:06
- Label: Asylum
- Songwriters: Andy Goldmark; Jamie Houston; James Dean Hicks
- Producer: Dann Huff

Bryan White singles chronology
"You're Still Beautiful to Me" (1999)	"God Gave Me You" (1999)	"How Long" (2000)

"God Gave Me You" is a song recorded by American country music artist Bryan White, and written by Andy Goldmark, Jamie Houston and James Dean Hicks. It was released in October 1999 as the second single from the album How Lucky I Am. The song reached No. 40 on the Billboard Hot Country Singles & Tracks chart.

== Chart performance ==
Chart (1999)	Peak position
US Hot Country Songs (Billboard)	40
Canadian RPM Country Tracks	49

== In popular culture ==
In 2015, "God Gave Me You" experienced a major surge in popularity in the Philippines after it became associated with AlDub—a popular on-air couple seen on the Kalyeserye segment of the local variety show Eat Bulaga!. White learned of the phenomenon in September 2015 after noting the significant amount of discussion related to AlDub and the song on Twitter. He explained that "the one thing that was reinforced for me is to never underestimate the impact of music and what it can do. Many years ago I worked hard in making that the best it can be, and it just goes to show that it's in God's timing. It was a hit in the United States but nothing compared to here now".
