= If She Don't Love You =

Single by The Buffalo Club

from the album The Buffalo Club
- B-side: "We Lose"
- Released: January 6, 1997
- Genre: Country
- Length: 3:38
- Label: Rising Tide
- Songwriters: Trey Bruce; Marc Beeson
- Producer: Barry Beckett

The Buffalo Club singles chronology
"If She Don't Love You" (1997)	"Nothin' Less Than Love" (1997)

"If She Don't Love You" is a debut song written by Trey Bruce and Marc Beeson, and recorded by American country music group The Buffalo Club. It was released in January 1997 as the first single from their self-titled debut album. The song reached #9 on the Billboard Hot Country Singles & Tracks chart.

== Critical reception ==
The single received a positive review in Billboard, which stated, "This well-written tune has the same accessible pop/country feel that marked Restless Heart's best work, yet it boasts a fresh, different twist and a slightly rawer feel that works extremely well."

== Chart performance ==
"If She Don't Love You" debuted at number 75 on the U.S. Billboard Hot Country Singles & Tracks for the week of January 18, 1997.

Chart (1997)	Peak position
Canada Country Singles (RPM)	12
US Hot Country Songs (Billboard)	9

=== Year-end charts ===
Chart (1997)	Position
Canada Country Tracks (RPM)	88
