= Donny Kees =

American songwriter and musician

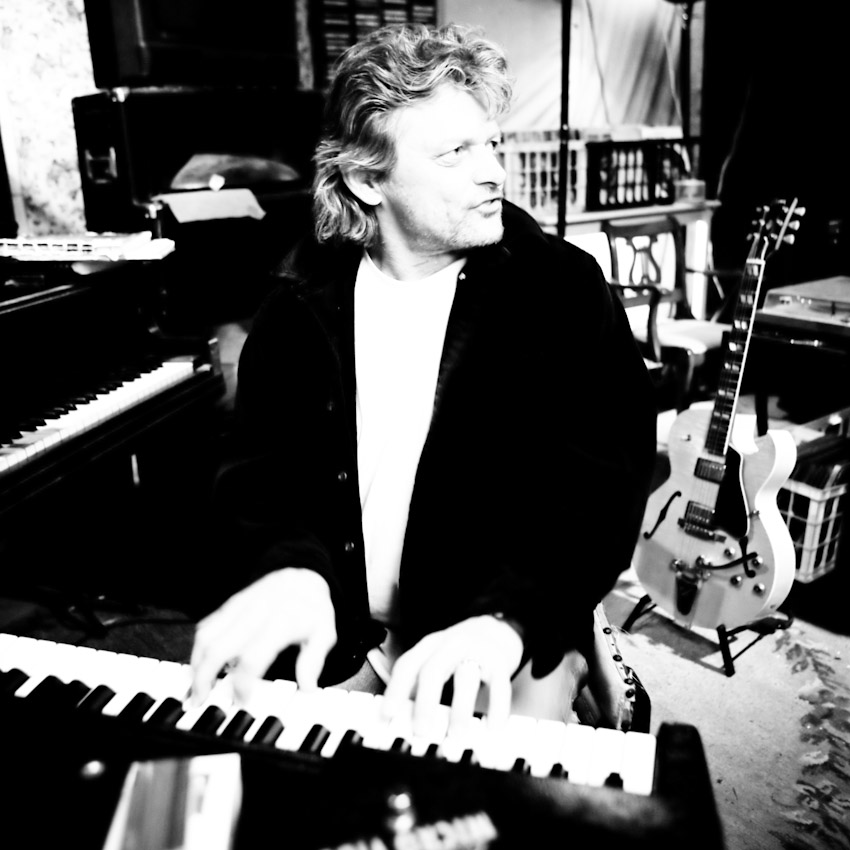
- Donny Kees in 2011 during the recording of The Hayes Street Sessions

Background information
- Genres: Country; R&B; soul
- Occupations: Singer; songwriter; musician
- Instruments: Vocals; keyboard; guitar
- Years active: 1972-present
- Spouse: Diana Marie Kees (m. 1966)
- Website: donny-kees.rhythmic-rebellion.com

Donny Kees is an American songwriter and musician. Kees has written songs for numerous artists and charted several singles on the Billboard country charts. Since 1984, Kees has continued to write hit songs for other artists, most notably George Strait, Kenny Chesney, Reba McEntire, George Jones, Conway Twitty, Joe Nichols, Bryan White and Diamond Rio.

== Early life ==
Kees was born in Carbondale, West Virginia, to Earnest "Pete" Kees, and Loretta. The family soon moved to Chesapeake, West Virginia, where Kees grew up. His father, an insurance salesman, musician and blues singer, influenced Kees' to pursue a career in music. When Kees was 12 years old, he became the youngest member of the local musicians union. As a young teen, he had his first public performance at a local Chesapeake venue called Ralph's with his band the Don Juans.

Continuing to perform with the Don Juans, Kees attended East Bank High School where he met his wife, Diana, and from where he graduated in 1965. After high school, he enlisted in the United States Air Force while attending University of Maryland and served in the Vietnam War in 1967 and 1968. During that time, he also performed for the United Services Organization (USO).

== Career ==
During the 1970's, Kees continued to perform and write music. He moved to Nashville, Tennessee, in 1984 after scoring cuts for Conway Twitty and others to pursue a career in songwriting, eventually signing a publishing deal with Acuff/Rose and an artist deal with 16th Avenue Records.

Kees quickly became one of Nashville's most sought after songwriters. Kees has had 3 number one singles on Billboard Country Charts and R&R charts along with five Top 10 singles. Kees has won five Broadcast Music (BMI) awards for 1 million plus airplays. In 1993, Kees' song "When Did You Stop Loving Me" from the Pure Country soundtrack by George Strait was nominated by the Music City News Songwriter Awards as a Top Ten Song of the Year. The song was later used in a nationwide ad campaign for Nissan. In 1997, he received a Nashville Songwriters Association International (NSAI) Achievement Award for his work on the number one hit, I'm Not Supposed to Love You Anymore, along with Skip Ewing and Bryan White and again in 2003 for I Believe, another with Skip Ewing, the latter also winning a BMI award in 2004. The 2002 song Brokenheartsville for singer Joe Nichols was Kees' first number one hit on the Billboard Hot Country Songs chart. Kees soon followed that up with ''I Believe" by Diamond Rio. The song spent two weeks at number one on the Billboard Hot Country Songs chart and also charted in the top 40 of Billboard Hot 100. The song has also been used in music therapy practices to help people deal with grief and loss.

== Awards and nominations ==
=== BMI ===
- 1994 - When Did You Stop Loving Me
- 1997 - I'm Not Supposed to Love You Anymore
- 1999 - If I Never Stop Loving You (song)
- 2003 - Brokenheartsville
- 2004 - I Believe (Diamond Rio song)

=== Nashville Songwriters Achievement Award ===
- 1997 - I'm Not Supposed to Love You Anymore
- 2003 - I Believe

=== Music City News Country Songwriters Award ===
- 1994 - When Did You Stop Loving Me (nominated)

== Selected discography ==
Kees has worked with country stars including George Strait, Kenny Chesney, Reba McEntire, George Jones, Conway Twitty, Joe Nichols, Diamond Rio, Bryan White, Aaron Tippin, Tammy Wynette, Randy Travis, Mark Wills, and Lorrie Morgan.

Kees has either written or co-written the following songs for other artists:

=== Singles ===
Year	Single	Peak positions	Artist
Year	Single	US Country	Artist
1990	Moody Woman	*	Charley Pride
1990	Searchin' for Some Kind of Clue	17	Billy Joe Royal
1993	When Did You Stop Loving Me	6	George Strait
1994	Whole Lotta Love on the Line	30	Aaron Tippin
1996	I'm Not Supposed to Love You Anymore	4	Bryan White
1997	"Connected at the Heart"	44	Ricochet
1997	There's Only You	43	Kevin Sharp
1997	The Used to Be's	48	Daryle Singletary
1998	If I Never Stop Loving You	3	David Kersh
2002	Brokenheartsville	1	Joe Nichols
2002	I Believe	1	Diamond Rio
		* Denotes did not chart	

Artist	Song	Co-writers
Aaron Tippin	"In My Wildest Dreams"	Aaron Tippin
Aaron Tippin	"This Heart"	Aaron Tippin
Aaron Tippin	"Whole Lotta Love on the Line"	Aaron Tippin
Aaron Tippin	"You Are the Woman"	Aaron Tippin
Aaron Tippin	"What This Country Needs"	Aaron Tippin
Billy Joe Royal	"Searchin' for Some Kind of Clue"	Pal Rakes, Nelson Larkin
Bryan White	"I'm Not Supposed To Love You Anymore"	Skip Ewing
Charley Pride	"Moody Woman"	James Troy Pickard (Jimmy Jay), Richard Ross
Charley Pride	"You Put It There"	James Troy Pickard (Jimmy Jay), Richard Ross
Conway Twitty	"Riverboat Gamblers"	James Troy Pickard (Jimmy Jay)
Conway Twitty	"You Put It There"	James Troy Pickard (Jimmy Jay), Richard Ross
Daryle Singletary	"A Love That Never Died"	Skip Ewing
Daryle Singletary	"The Used to Be's"	Michael Huffman, Bob Morrison
David Kersh	"If I Never Stop Loving You"	Skip Ewing
Dawn Sears	"Old-Fashioned Broken Heart"	Terri Sharp
Dawn Sears	"He's In Dallas"	Richard Ross, Johnny MacRae
Diamond Rio	"I Believe"	Skip Ewing
Donna Meade	"Love's Last Stand"	Tommy Riggs, James Troy Pickard (Jimmy Jay)
Doug Stone	"How Do I Get Off the Moon"	Randy Boudreaux, Kerry Kurt Phillips
Eddy Raven	"Neon Row"	James Troy Pickard (Jimmy Jay)
Eddy Raven	"Stay with Me"	Ricky Ray Rector
George Jones	"I've Still Got Some Hurtin' Left to Do"	Richard Ross
George Jones	"When Did You Stop Loving Me"	Monty Holmes
George Jones & Tammy Wynette	"Whatever Happened to Us"	Don Sampson
George Strait	"She Took the Wind From His Sails"	Dean Dillon
George Strait	"When Did You Stop Loving Me"	Monty Holmes
George Strait	"If It's Gonna Rain"	Dean Dillon, Scotty Emerick
George Strait	"Down Louisiana Way"	Aaron Barker, Sanger D Shafer
George Strait	"Neon Row"	James Troy Pickard (Jimmy Jay)
George Strait	"When Love Comes Around Again	Monty Holmes, Jeff Silvey
George Strait	"I'll Always Be Loving You"	Aaron Barker, Sanger D Shafer
Joe Nichols	"Brokenheartsville"	Blake Mevis, Randy Boudreaux, Clint Daniels
John Michael Montgomery	"What I Do the Best"	Michael Huffman, Monty Holmes
Johnny Rodriguez	"Maxine"	James Troy Pickard (Jimmy Jay)
Keith Harling	"Over You"	Skip Ewing
Kenny Chesney	"Somebody's Callin' "	Kenny Chesney
Kenny Chesney	"I Finally Found Somebody"	Kenny Chesney
Kenny Chesney	"In My Wildest Dreams"	Aaron Tippin
Kenny Chesney	"I'd Love to Change Your Name"	Jim Weatherly, Kenny Chesney
Kenny Chesney	"You Win, I Win, We Lose"	Buddy Brock, Kenny Chesney
Kenny Chesney	"Lonely, Needin' Lovin' "	Buddy Brock, Kenny Chesney
Kevin Sharp	"There's Only You"	Skip Ewing
Lane Brody	"Till You Found Me"	Jim Weatherly
Lee Anne Womack	"Thinkin' with My Heart Again"	Sanger D. Shafer, Dean Dillon
Lorrie Morgan	"Back Among the Living"	Skip Ewing
Mark Wills	"Help Me Fall"	Skip Ewing
Mark Wills	"Back on Earth"	Skip Ewing
Neal McCoy	"Why Not Tonight"	James Troy Pickard (Jimmy Jay), Richard Ross
Oleta Adams	"I Knew You When"	Shawna Harrington-Burkhart
Randy Travis	"Ants on a Log"	Skip Ewing
Randy Travis	"Once In a Heart Like Mine"	Skip Ewing
Reba McEntire	"He's In Dallas"	Richard Ross, Johnny MacRae
Reba McEntire	"Now You Tell Me"	Shawna Harrington-Burkhart
Ricochet	"Connected at the Heart"	Skip Ewing
Ricky Van Shelton	"Love Is Burnin' "	Frank J. Myers
Sammy Kershaw	"What Might Have Been"	Dean Dillion
Sammy Kershaw	"If You Ever Come This Way Again"	Dean Dillion
Tammy Wynette	"What Do They Know"	Richard Ross
Tanya Tucker	"What Do They Know"	Richard Ross
Travis Tritt	"It's All About the Money"	Jody Harris
Ty Herndon	"Thinkin' with My Heart Again"	Sanger D. Shafer, Dean Dillon
Zac Brown	"Grandma's Garden"	Skip Ewing

== Notes ==
1. "Moody Woman" did not chart on Hot Country Songs, but peaked at No. 9 on Hot Country Radio Breakouts.
