= The Coast of Colorado =

Studio album by Skip Ewing
- Released: April 4, 1988
- Genre: Country
- Length: 33:29
- Label: MCA
- Producer: Jimmy Bowen, Skip Ewing

Skip Ewing chronology
The Coast of Colorado (1988)	The Will to Love (1989)

Singles from The Coast of Colorado
- 1. "Your Memory Wins Again" Released: March 5, 1988; 2. "I Don't Have Far to Fall" Released: August 1988; 3. "Burnin' a Hole in My Heart" Released: November 1988; 4. "The Gospel According to Luke" Released: February 1989; 5. "The Coast of Colorado" Released: June 24, 1989

Professional ratings
Review scores
Source	Rating
AllMusic	4/5 stars

The Coast of Colorado is the debut studio album by American country music artist Skip Ewing. It was released on April 4, 1988, via MCA Records. The album includes the singles "Your Memory Wins Again", "I Don't Have Far to Fall", "Burnin' a Hole in My Heart", "The Gospel According to Luke" and the title track, all of which reached the top 20 on the Billboard Hot Country Singles & Tracks chart.

"Don't Mind If I Do" was previously recorded by George Strait on his 1988 album If You Ain't Lovin' You Ain't Livin'. "Lighter Shade of Blue" was covered by Shelby Lynne on her 1991 album Soft Talk and Reba McEntire on her 1993 album It's Your Call. "Autumn's Not That Cold" was covered by Lorrie Morgan on her 1991 album Something in Red. "Still Under the Weather" was covered by Andy Williams on his 1991 album Nashville and Shania Twain on her 1993 self-titled debut album.

== Track listing ==
No.	Title	Writer(s)	Length
1.	"Burnin' a Hole in My Heart"	Skip Ewing, Mike Geiger, Woody Mullis	3:16
2.	"Lighter Shade of Blue"	Ewing, Max D. Barnes, Troy Seals	3:30
3.	"I Don't Have Far to Fall"	Ewing, Don Sampson	3:28
4.	"Autumn's Not That Cold"	Ewing, Barnes	3:34
5.	"The Coast of Colorado"	Ewing, Barnes	3:50
6.	"Your Memory Wins Again"	Ewing, Geiger, Mullis	3:07
7.	"Dad"	Ewing	3:28
8.	"Don't Mind If I Do"	Ewing, Sampson	2:46
9.	"The Gospel According to Luke"	Ewing, Sampson	3:43
10.	"Still Under the Weather"	Ewing, L. E. White, Michael White	2:47

== Personnel ==
Adapted from liner notes.

- Skip Ewing - lead vocals
- Mike Geiger - background vocals
- David Hungate - bass guitar
- Kirk "Jelly Roll" Johnson - harmonica
- Mike Lawler - synthesizer
- Claire Lynch - background vocals
- Rick Marotta - drums
- Woody Mullis - background vocals
- Matt Rollings - piano
- Billy Joe Walker Jr. - acoustic guitar, electric guitar
- Curtis "Mr. Harmony" Young - background vocals
- Reggie Young - electric guitar

== Charts ==
=== Weekly charts ===
Chart (1988–1989)	Peak position
US Top Country Albums (Billboard)	29

=== Year-end charts ===
Chart (1989)	Position
US Top Country Albums (Billboard)	42

=== Singles ===
Year	Single	Peak chart positions	
Year	Single	US Country	CAN Country
1988	"Your Memory Wins Again"	17	—
1988	"I Don't Have Far to Fall"	8	*
1988	"Burnin' a Hole in My Heart"	3	*
1989	"The Gospel According to Luke"	10	11
1989	"The Coast of Colorado"	15	24
"—" denotes releases that did not chart * denotes unknown peak positions
