= Look at Me Now (Bryan White song) =

Single by Bryan White

from the album Bryan White
- B-side: "Helpless Heart"
- Released: December 12, 1994
- Recorded: 1994
- Genre: Country
- Length: 3:07
- Label: Asylum
- Songwriters: Bryan White, Derek George, John Tirro
- Producers: Billy Joe Walker Jr., Kyle Lehning

Bryan White singles chronology
| "Eugene You Genius" (1994) | "Look at Me Now" (1994) | "Someone Else's Star" (1995) |

"Look at Me Now" is a song co-written and recorded by American country music artist Bryan White. It was released in December 1994 as the second single from the album Bryan White. The song reached number 24 on the Billboard Hot Country Singles & Tracks chart. White wrote the song with Derek George and John Tirro.

== Music video ==
The music video was directed by Jeffrey C. Phillips and premiered in early 1995, It shows vignettes of Bryan White performing the song in a grand canyon in a daytime setting, and it shows a woman in the video, Meanwhile, the sunlight flashes on him.

== Critical reception ==
Tom Lanham of New Country magazine said that the song was "stomping Eagles-ish celebration" and a "picture-perfect anthem".

== Chart performance ==
"Look at Me Now" debuted at number 70 on the U.S. Billboard Hot Country Singles & Tracks for the week of December 24, 1994.

| Chart (1994–1995) | Peak position |
|---|---|
| Canada Country Singles (RPM) | 12 |
| US Hot Country Songs (Billboard) | 24 |
