= Williams Riley =

Country music band

- Origin: United States
- Genres: Country
- Years active: 2009-2010
- Labels: Golden Music; Wide Open Music
- Past members: Nick Buda; Derek George; Dave Guidry; Charlie Hutto; Joe Rogers; Travis Thibodaux; Steve Williams

Williams Riley was an American country music band composed of Steve Williams (lead vocals), Derek George (guitar, background vocals), Charlie Hutto (guitar, background vocals), Joe Rogers (steel guitar, fiddle, harmonica), Dave Guidry (bass guitar), Travis Thibodaux (keyboards, background vocals) and Nick Buda (drums). Derek George had formerly played guitar for Bryan White, and before that, he was a member of the band Pearl River. Williams Riley self-released its debut album in 2009 and has charted on the U.S. country charts with "Country Livin'." This album includes collaborations with White, as well as Slash and Edwin McCain. The band's self-titled debut album received a favorable review from Matt Bjorke of Roughstock, who called it a "well-crafted album of contemporary country music."

On June 21, 2010, the band's label, Golden Music announced it was shutting its Nashville division. George produced Randy Houser's 2013 album How Country Feels.

== Discography ==
=== Albums ===
Title	Album details
Williams Riley	Release date: June 23, 2009; Label: Golden Music
A Different Kind of Country	Release date: May 25, 2010; Label: Golden Music

=== Singles ===
Year	Single	Peak Positions	Album
Year	Single	US Country	Album
2009	"I'm Still Me"	—	Williams Riley
2009	"Country Livin'"	43	A Different Kind of Country
2010	"Makes Me Go (La La)"	59	A Different Kind of Country
2010	"Life in the Fast Lane"	—	Non-album song
"—" denotes releases that did not chart

=== Music videos ===
Year	Video	Director
2009	"I'm Still Me"	Stephen Shepherd
2009	"Better Man	
