= The Buffalo Club (album) =

Studio album by The Buffalo Club
- Released: March 25, 1997
- Genre: Country
- Length: 37:11
- Label: Rising Tide
- Producer: Barry Beckett

Singles from The Buffalo Club
- 1. "If She Don't Love You" Released: January 6, 1997; 2. "Nothin' Less Than Love" Released: June 7, 1997; 3. "Heart Hold On" Released: 1997

The Buffalo Club is the only studio album by American country music group The Buffalo Club. It was released on March 25, 1997 via Rising Tide Records. The album included the singles "If She Don't Love You", "Nothin' Less Than Love" and "Heart Hold On".

== Critical reception ==
It received a mostly unfavorable review from Country Standard Time magazine, whose critic Robert Loy said "the harmonies are above average, and Ron Hemby's vocals deserve better material than anything here." A more favorable review came from Billboard, which compared the band favorably to the Eagles and praised the "crisp production".

== Track listing ==
No.	Title	Writer(s)	Length
1.	"You Should See Her Now"	Greg Barnhill, Vince Melamed, Hawk Wolinski	4:26
2.	"Heart Hold On"	Henry Paul, Vicky McGehee, Mike Lawler	4:00
3.	"The Funny Thing Is"	John Dittrich, Rick Bowles	3:34
4.	"Never Enough"	Pat Alger, Marc Beeson	3:34
5.	"All My Life"	Steve Seskin, Annie Roboff	3:14
6.	"If She Don't Love You"	Trey Bruce, Beeson	3:38
7.	"After Alice"	Gary Burr, John Barlow Jarvis	4:05
8.	"End of Lonely Road"	Melamed, Bob DiPiero, Barnhill	3:29
9.	"Wish for You"	DiPiero, Ron Hemby	3:12
10.	"Nothin' Less Than Love"	Wayne Tester, Rusty Young	3:59
Total length:			37:11

== Personnel ==
As listed in liner notes.

=== The Buffalo Club ===
- John Dittrich – harmony vocals, drums
- Ron Hemby – lead vocals, acoustic guitar
- Charlie Kelley – harmony vocals, electric guitar

=== Additional musicians ===
- Eddie Bayers – drums
- Barry Beckett – keyboards
- Tom Hemby – acoustic guitar
- Ric Latina – electric guitar
- Mike Lawler – synthesizer
- Phil Naish – keyboards
- Michael Rhodes – bass guitar
- Chris Rodriguez – acoustic guitar
- Mike Severs – electric guitar
- Mark Thompson – drums
- Biff Watson – acoustic guitar

== Singles ==
Year	Single	Peak chart positions	
Year	Single	US Country	CAN Country
1997	"If She Don't Love You"	9	12
1997	"Nothin' Less Than Love"	26	42
1997	"Heart Hold On"	53	77
