= Burnin' a Hole in My Heart =

Single by Skip Ewing

from the album The Coast of Colorado
- B-side: "Autumn's Not That Cold"
- Released: November 1988
- Genre: Country
- Length: 3:16
- Label: MCA
- Songwriter(s): Skip Ewing, Mike Geiger, Woody Mullis
- Producer(s): Jimmy Bowen, Skip Ewing

Skip Ewing singles chronology
"I Don't Have Far to Fall" (1988)	"Burnin' a Hole in My Heart" (1988)	"The Gospel According to Luke" (1989)

"Burnin' a Hole in My Heart" is a song co-written and recorded by American country music artist Skip Ewing. It was released in November 1988 as the third single from the album The Coast of Colorado. The song reached number 3 on the Billboard Hot Country Singles & Tracks chart. Ewing wrote the song with Mike Geiger and Woody Mullis.

== Chart performance ==
Chart (1988–1989)	Peak position
US Hot Country Songs (Billboard)	3

=== Year-end charts ===
Chart (1989)	Position
Canada Country Tracks (RPM)	81
US Country Songs (Billboard)	66
