= I'm Not Supposed to Love You Anymore =

Single by Bryan White

from the album Between Now and Forever
- B-side: "Blindhearted"
- Released: February 26, 1996
- Recorded: 1995
- Genre: Country
- Length: 3:43
- Label: Asylum
- Songwriters: Skip Ewing; Donny Kees
- Producers: Kyle Lehning; Billy Joe Walker Jr.

Bryan White singles chronology
| "Rebecca Lynn" (1995) | "I'm Not Supposed to Love You Anymore" (1996) | "So Much for Pretending" (1996) |

"I'm Not Supposed to Love You Anymore" is a song written by Skip Ewing and Donny Kees, and recorded by American country music singer Bryan White. It was released in February 1996 as the first single from his album Between Now and Forever. The song peaked at number four on the U.S. country chart and at number two on the Canadian country chart. It also peaked at number one on the Bubbling Under Hot 100 chart.

== Music video ==
The music video was directed by Jeffrey C. Phillips and premiered in early 1996.

== Chart performance ==
"I'm Not Supposed to Love You Anymore" debuted at number 61 on the U.S. Billboard Hot Country Singles & Tracks for the chart week of March 2, 1996.

| Chart (1996) | Peak position |
|---|---|
| Canada Country Singles (RPM) | 2 |
| US Bubbling Under Hot 100 (Billboard) | 1 |
| US Hot Country Songs (Billboard) | 4 |

=== Year-end charts ===
| Chart (1996) | Position |
|---|---|
| Canada Country Tracks (RPM) | 42 |
| US Country Songs (Billboard) | 24 |
