= So Much for Pretending =

"So Much For Pretending"

Single by Bryan White

from the album Between Now and Forever
- B-side: "On Any Given Night"
- Released: June 24, 1996
- Genre: Country
- Length: 2:32
- Label: Asylum
- Songwriters: Bryan White; Derek George; John Tirro
- Producers: Kyle Lehning; Billy Joe Walker Jr.

Bryan White singles chronology
"I'm Not Supposed to Love You Anymore" (1996)	"So Much For Pretending" (1996)	"That's Another Song" (1996)

"So Much for Pretending" is a song co-written and recorded by American country music singer Bryan White. It was released in June 1996 as the second single from his album Between Now and Forever. The song was White's third No. 1 single – and with a pair of weeks on top (September 21–28, 1996), his only multi-week No. 1 – on the Billboard Hot Country Singles & Tracks (now Hot Country Songs) chart.

White co-wrote the song with John Tirro and Derek George, the latter of whom was a former member of the band Pearl River.

== Music video ==
The music video was directed by Jeffrey C. Phillips and premiered in mid-1996.

The video is also noted for a cameo appearance by then-Texas Rangers first baseman Will Clark, who is seen walking with White down the tunnel at The Ballpark in Arlington.

== Chart positions ==
Chart (1996)	Peak position
Canada Country Singles (RPM)	1
US Bubbling Under Hot 100 (Billboard)	19
US Hot Country Songs (Billboard)	1

=== Year-end charts ===
Chart (1996)	Position
Canada Country Tracks (RPM)	41
US Country Songs (Billboard)	13
