= The Buffalo Club =

American country music group (1996–1997)

- A promotional picture of the Buffalo Club (L-R: Ron Hemby, John Dittrich, Charlie Kelley)

Background information
- Origin: Nashville, Tennessee, U.S.
- Genres: Country
- Years active: 1996–1997
- Label: Rising Tide
- Spinoff of: Restless Heart; The Imperials
- Past members: John Dittrich; Ron Hemby; Charlie Kelley

The Buffalo Club was an American country music group from Nashville, Tennessee. The group's members were Ron Hemby (lead vocals, guitar), John Dittrich (vocals, drums), and Charlie Kelley (vocals, guitar). Hemby was a vocalist in the Christian group the Imperials, Kelley played guitar for Doug Stone, and Dittrich had left his role as the drummer in the band Restless Heart. The Buffalo Club released a self-titled album on the Rising Tide Records label in 1997 and charted three singles on the Billboard Hot Country Songs charts that year, including "If She Don't Love You" at number nine. The album received generally positive reviews for the band's use of vocal harmony. After Dittrich quit in August 1997, Hemby and Kelley briefly continued as a duo before disbanding by year's end. Dittrich rejoined Restless Heart in 1998, while Kelley and Hemby started other projects.

== History ==
=== Foundation ===
The Buffalo Club was founded in 1996 in Nashville, Tennessee. John Dittrich, best known as the drummer for the country music band Restless Heart, founded the group along with Ron Hemby and Charlie Kelley. After Restless Heart disbanded in 1995, Dittrich wanted to start a musical act in which he got to exercise more creative control than he had in that band, but did not feel he was suitable as a solo artist. He then met Hemby, a vocalist for the contemporary Christian music group the Imperials, and the two recruited Kelley, who had previously been a backing musician for Charly McClain and Doug Stone. Hemby assumed the role of lead vocalist. Both Kelley and Dittrich served as harmony vocalists, also contributing on guitar and drums respectively. Working with Dan Goodman as their manager, the three musicians recorded a demo which was sent to Ken Levitan, then president of Rising Tide Records. The label's Nashville division, dedicated to country music, signed the band soon after. Hemby and Dittrich said their main influence was the country rock of the 1970s, such as the Eagles, particularly in the use of vocal harmony and acoustic guitar. Kelley thought that the band's sound would be appealing to radio as they intended to use fewer instruments on the songs than were normal at the time. Hemby thought that the band's sound would have "more aggressive harmony".

Initially, the group was to be called Johnny Ringo, but was renamed as representatives of Rising Tide disliked the original name. According to Hemby, the band wanted a name with a Western theme, and came up with "the Buffalo Club" after a friend of his told him about a group of bars in the town of Buffalo, Wyoming. After signing, the band began recording songs with producer Barry Beckett. Dittrich had previously worked with Beckett on a movie soundtrack to which Restless Heart had contributed, and chose him to be the Buffalo Club's producer because he "admired" Beckett's production style. Additionally, Hemby noted that Beckett was less controlling than other producers with whom he had worked previously. By the end of 1996, the band began promoting themselves with impromptu acoustic performances in the offices of Nashville record executives.

=== Self-titled album ===
Rising Tide Records selected "If She Don't Love You" as the band's first single. Upon its release to country radio in early 1997, the track reached number nine on the American Billboard Hot Country Songs chart and number twelve on the Canadian country music charts then published by RPM. This song had been previously offered to Restless Heart, who declined it. Its co-writers were Trey Bruce and Marc Beeson, the latter of whom was recording on Curb Records as a member of Burnin' Daylight. Joel Hoffner, then the vice president of sales and marketing for Rising Tide Records, came up with two unusual methods to promote the band. First, he sent packages containing plastic buffalo in them, with no return address, to various industry executives before sending those same executives a promotional card for the band one week later. Hoffner observed that the plastic buffalo became a topic of conversation among said executives. In addition, the compact disc single release of "If She Don't Love You" featured the song on it 20 times so that the song would continue playing if listeners neglected to turn off their players.

The band's debut album, The Buffalo Club, was released on March 25, 1997. Beckett produced the album and played keyboards on it, with other contributing musicians including Eddie Bayers and Michael Rhodes. Dittrich co-wrote the track "The Funny Thing Is", and Hemby co-wrote "Wish for You". An uncredited review of the album in Billboard compared the band's sound favorably to that of the Eagles while also praising the songwriting. Gordon Ely of the Richmond Times-Dispatch also reviewed the album with favor, drawing comparisons to the Eagles, Restless Heart, and Crosby, Stills & Nash. His review was favorable toward the album's songwriting and the trio's vocal harmony. Robert Loy of Country Standard Time gave a more mixed review, stating that "the harmonies are above average, and Ron Hemby's vocals deserve better material than anything here". In mid-1997, the band supported the album by touring alongside Sherrié Austin as opening acts for Tracy Lawrence. They also performed several shows at Toolies, a former nightclub in Phoenix, Arizona.

Following "If She Don't Love You" was "Nothin' Less Than Love", which was co-written by Rusty Young of Poco and originally recorded by Bryan White on his 1994 self-titled debut album. The Buffalo Club's rendition peaked at number 26 on Hot Country Songs by the middle of the year. Dittrich left the band in August 1997, stating in a letter of resignation, "I am no longer able to continue to do the things deemed necessary to break a new artist in this format". At the time of his resignation, Hemby and Kelley announced their intent to continue as a duo. The Buffalo Club then released their third and final single "Heart Hold On". Co-written by Blackhawk lead singer Henry Paul, this song peaked at number 53 on the country music charts. The song's corresponding music video was the directorial debut of Trey Fanjoy, who went on to direct a number of country music videos in the late 1990s and into the 21st century.

=== Disbanding ===
Hemby and Kelley disbanded in December 1997. In addition, Rising Tide Records closed in March 1998, with the Buffalo Club representing the label's only success at country radio. At the time of their disbanding, Rising Tide executive Ken Levitan stated that Dittrich's announcement that he would rejoin Restless Heart on a reunion tour in 1998 created disputes between the two of them and was a factor in Dittrich's departure. In addition, Hemby and Kelley were unable to continue as a duo because Hemby wanted to be the sole lead singer, whereas Kelley wanted the two to alternate on lead vocals. Dittrich rejoined Restless Heart in 1998 as part of the reunion tour. By 2013, Kelley founded the polka duo the Boxhounds with Lynn Marie. Hemby went on to become a touring musician for David Kersh before becoming a worship leader at a church in Franklin, Tennessee, in addition to founding an Eagles tribute band called the Eaglemaniacs.

== Discography ==
=== Studio albums ===
Title	Album details	Peak chart positions
Title	Album details	US Country
The Buffalo Club	Release date: March 25, 1997; Label: Rising Tide Records; Format: Compact disc, audio cassette	69

=== Singles ===
Title	Year	Peak chart positions		Album
Title	Year	US Country	CAN Country	Album
"If She Don't Love You"	1997	9	12	The Buffalo Club
"Nothin' Less Than Love"	1997	26	42	The Buffalo Club
"Heart Hold On"	1997	53	77	The Buffalo Club

=== Music videos ===
Title	Year	Director
"Heart Hold On"	1997	Trey Fanjoy
