= Davis Daniel (album) =

Studio album by Davis Daniel
- Released: 1994
- Genre: Country
- Length: 33:29
- Label: Polydor Nashville
- Producer: Harold Shedd, Davis Daniel

Davis Daniel chronology
Fighting Fire with Fire (1991)	Davis Daniel (1994)	I Know a Place (1995)

Professional ratings
Review scores
Source	Rating
Allmusic	3/5 stars
New Country	2.5/5 stars

Davis Daniel is the second studio album by American country music artist Davis Daniel. "I Miss Her Missing Me", "William and Mary", and "Tyler" were all released as singles from this album; unlike the singles from his previous album, however, none of these reached Top 40 on the Hot Country Songs charts.

== Critical reception ==
Cub Koda of Allmusic rated the album 3 stars out of 5, saying that "while his looks outweigh the relative thinness of his voice, there's enough good stuff here to make you think that he might develop into something more than a one-shot artist." Giving it 2½ stars out of 5, Michael McCall of New Country magazine considered it an improvement over his debut album, which he called "a forgettable effort with clunky, outdated production and an aimless collection of lightweight pop-country songs", although he thought that most of the songs on Davis Daniel were "catchy" and "weightless". McCall thought that "Tyler" and "Out Here Sits the King" were the best-written on the album, and that Daniel's performance on them was "sensitive".

== Track listing ==
1. "Shame on Me" (Charlotte Wilson, Lonnie Wilson) - 2:45
2. "I Miss Her Missing Me" (Ronnie Samoset, Craig Wiseman) - 3:32
3. "William and Mary" (George McCorkle, Rick Williamson) - 2:21
4. "Somebody's Gonna Lose" (Larry Butler, Mark Sherrill) - 3:11
5. "Someone Else's Star" (Skip Ewing, Jim Weatherly) - 3:34
6. "She Could Make a Freight Train Take a Dirt Road" (Paul Overstreet) - 4:07
7. "I Saw You" (Eddie Hill, Johnny Neel, John Wesley Ryles) - 3:32
8. "All Heaven Broke Loose Last Night" (Tim Bays, Annette Cotter, Roberta Schiller) - 2:49
9. "Out Here Sits the King" (Davis Daniel) - 3:12
10. "Tyler" (Daniel, Lance Rogge) - 4:19

== Personnel ==
- David Briggs - keyboards
- Mike Brignardello - bass guitar
- Buddy Cannon - background vocals
- Mark Casstevens - acoustic guitar
- Carol Chase - background vocals
- Dan Dugmore - steel guitar
- Glen Duncan - fiddle
- Paul Franklin - steel guitar
- Sonny Garrish - Dobro, steel guitar
- Mike Lawler - synthesizer
- Anthony Martin - background vocals
- Danny Parks - acoustic guitar, electric guitar
- Christopher Paul - background vocals
- Larry Paxton - bass guitar
- Dave Pomeroy - bass guitar
- Ronny Scaife - background vocals
- Michael Severs - electric guitar
- Milton Sledge - drums
- John D. Willis - acoustic guitar
- Reggie Young - electric guitar
