= For Crying Out Loud (song) =

Single by Davis Daniel

from the album Fighting Fire with Fire
- B-side: "No Place to Go"
- Released: August 31, 1991
- Genre: Country
- Length: 2:25
- Label: Mercury
- Songwriters: Jimmy Compton; Phillip W. Wood
- Producer: Ron Haffkine

Davis Daniel singles chronology
"Picture Me" (1991)	"For Crying Out Loud" (1991)	"Fighting Fire with Fire" (1992)

"For Crying Out Loud" is a song written by Jimmy Compton and Phillip W. Wood, produced by Ron Haffkine, and recorded by American country music artist Davis Daniel. It was released in August 1991 as the second single from his album Fighting Fire with Fire. The song reached No. 13 on the Billboard Hot Country Singles & Tracks chart in November 1991.

== Chart performance ==
Chart (1991)	Peak position
Canada Country Singles (RPM)	21
US Hot Country Songs (Billboard)	13
