= Rebecca Lynn =

Single by Bryan White

from the album Bryan White
- B-side: "Nothin' Less Than Love"
- Released: September 1995
- Recorded: 1994
- Genre: Country
- Length: 3:58
- Label: Asylum
- Songwriters: Don Sampson; Skip Ewing
- Producers: Kyle Lehning; Billy Joe Walker Jr.

Bryan White singles chronology
"Someone Else's Star" (1995)	"Rebecca Lynn" (1995)	"I'm Not Supposed to Love You Anymore" (1996)

"Rebecca Lynn" is a song co-written by Skip Ewing and Don Sampson, originally recorded by Ewing on his 1990 album A Healin' Fire.

It was later recorded by American country music singer Bryan White. It was released in September 1995 as the fourth and final single from his self-titled debut album. The song reached a peak of number one on the Billboard country charts in early 1996, giving White his second number one.

== Content ==
"Rebecca Lynn" is a mid-tempo country ballad in which the narrator recalls a female named Rebecca Lynn, a "quiet girl with green eyes full of fire" with whom he fell in love in second grade. The first verse and chorus follow them through elementary school as they play together. In the second verse, they learn in high school "what it really means to be in love" and eventually get engaged after the prom. By the third verse, the two have married and had a child named Laura Jean together as well.

At Music Fest '96, White sang the song to Rebecca Lynn Rushing, a fan of his who was then 6 years old. The song also won White the TNN/Music City News award for Single of the Year.

== Critical reception ==
Tom Lanham of New Country magazine favorably compared White's delivery on the song to that of Vince Gill, calling the song "lazy small-town reminiscence".

== Music video ==
The music video was directed by Jeffrey C. Phillips and premiered in late 1995.

== Chart positions ==
Chart (1995–1996)	Peak position
Canada Country Singles (RPM)	2
US Bubbling Under Hot 100 (Billboard)	14
US Hot Country Songs (Billboard)	1

=== Year-end charts ===
Chart (1996)	Position
Canada Country Tracks (RPM)	55
