= One Small Miracle =

Single by Bryan White

from the album The Right Place
- Released: December 1997
- Recorded: 1997
- Genre: Country
- Length: 3:52
- Label: Asylum
- Songwriters: Bill Anderson; Steve Wariner
- Producers: Billy Joe Walker Jr.; Kyle Lehning

Bryan White singles chronology
"Love Is the Right Place" (1997)	"One Small Miracle" (1997)	"Bad Day to Let You Go" (1998)

"One Small Miracle" is a song written by Bill Anderson and Steve Wariner, and recorded by American country music artist Bryan White. It was released in December 1997 as the second single from the album The Right Place. The song reached number 16 on the Billboard Hot Country Singles & Tracks chart.

== Chart performance ==
Chart (1997–1998)	Peak position
Canada Country Singles (RPM)	22
US Hot Country Songs (Billboard)	16
