= That's Another Song =

Single by Bryan White

from the album Between Now and Forever
- Released: October 7, 1996
- Recorded: 1995
- Genre: Country
- Length: 3:11
- Label: Asylum
- Songwriters: Jule Medders; Monty Powell; John Paul Daniel; Doug Pincock
- Producers: Billy Joe Walker Jr.; Kyle Lehning

Bryan White singles chronology
"So Much for Pretending" (1996)	"That's Another Song" (1996)	"Sittin' on Go" (1997)

"That's Another Song" is a song recorded by American country music artist Bryan White. It was released in October 1996 as the third single from the album Between Now and Forever. The song reached number 15 on the U.S. Billboard Hot Country Singles & Tracks chart and peaked at number 10 on the RPM Country Tracks chart in Canada. It was written by Jule Medders, Monty Powell, John Paul Daniel, and Doug Pincock.

== Music video ==
The music video was directed by Jeffrey C. Phillips and premiered in late 1996.

== Chart performance ==
"That's Another Song" debuted at number 60 on the U.S. Billboard Hot Country Singles & Tracks chart for the week of October 19, 1996.

Chart (1996–1997)	Peak position
Canada Country Singles (RPM)	10
US Hot Country Songs (Billboard)	15
