= Marc Beeson =

American singer-songwriter (born 1954)

- Born: December 20, 1954 (age 71); Champaign, Illinois, U.S.
- Genre: Country
- Occupation: Singer-songwriter
- Years active: 1980s–present
- Label: BNA
- Formerly of: Burnin' Daylight

Marc Beeson (born December 20, 1954) is an American country music singer and songwriter. Beeson has co-written several singles which have reached the Hot Country Songs charts.

== Life and career ==
Beeson moved to Nashville, Tennessee in 1990. One of his first co-writes was "Even Now", a top 20 hit for Exile.

In 1992, he co-wrote Restless Heart's "When She Cries", which won him Country Song of the Year and Pop Song of the Year awards from the American Society of Composers, Authors and Publishers (ASCAP). Beeson signed to BNA Records in 1994, charting at number 70 with "A Wing and a Prayer".

In 1997, Beeson founded the group Burnin' Daylight with former Exile member Sonny LeMaire and former Southern Pacific member Kurt Howell. This group recorded one album for Curb Records and charted three singles, as well as receiving a nomination for New Vocal Group or Duo from the Academy of Country Music.

Beeson has returned to songwriting, including Pat Green's 2008 single "Let Me". Marc Beeson's songs are represented by Downtown Music Publishing.

== Discography ==
=== Singles ===
Year	Single	Peak positions
Year	Single	US Country
1994	"A Wing and a Prayer"	70

=== Music videos ===
Year	Video
1994	"A Wing and a Prayer"

== Singles co-written by Beeson ==
Singles that Beeson co-wrote include:

- Big Kenny — "Long After I'm Gone"
- The Buffalo Club — "If She Don't Love You"
- Burnin' Daylight — "Say Yes"
- Chicago — "All Roads Lead to You"
- Billy Currington — "We Are Tonight"
- Linda Davis — "From the Inside Out"
- Due West — "The Bible and the Belt"
- Exile — "Even Now"
- Pat Green — "Let Me", "What I'm For"
- Martina McBride — "Phones Are Ringin' All Over Town"
- Restless Heart — "When She Cries"
- LeAnn Rimes — "This Love"
- Blake Shelton — "She's Got a Way with Words"
