= Love Is the Right Place =

Single by Bryan White

from the album The Right Place
- B-side: "Between Now and Forever"
- Released: July 28, 1997
- Recorded: 1997
- Genre: Country
- Length: 3:15
- Label: Asylum
- Songwriters: Marcus Hummon; Tommy Sims
- Producers: Kyle Lehning; Billy Joe Walker Jr.

Bryan White singles chronology
| "Sittin' on Go" (1997) | "Love Is the Right Place" (1997) | "One Small Miracle" (1997) |

"Love Is the Right Place" is a song written by Marcus Hummon and Tommy Sims, and recorded by American country music singer Bryan White. It was released in July 1997 as the first single from his album The Right Place. The song peaked at number four on the U.S. country chart and at number three on the Canadian country chart. It also peaked at number one on the Bubbling Under Hot 100 chart.

== Music video ==
The music video was directed by Jeffrey C. Phillips and premiered in mid-1997.

== Chart performance ==
"Love Is the Right Place" debuted at number 65 on the U.S. Billboard Hot Country Singles & Tracks for the chart week of August 2, 1997.

| Chart (1997) | Peak position |
|---|---|
| Canada Country Singles (RPM) | 3 |
| US Bubbling Under Hot 100 (Billboard) | 1 |
| US Hot Country Songs (Billboard) | 4 |

=== Year-end charts ===
| Chart (1997) | Position |
|---|---|
| Canada Country Tracks (RPM) | 68 |
| US Country Songs (Billboard) | 56 |
