= Pearl River (band) =

American country music band

- Origin: Philadelphia, Mississippi, United States
- Genres: Country
- Years active: 1993–1994
- Label: Liberty
- Past members: Steve Argo; Bryan Culpeper; Chuck Ethredge; Derek George; Ken Fleming; Joe Morgan; Garry Schiera; Jeff Stewart

Pearl River was an American country music band composed of Jeff Stewart (lead vocals), Chuck Ethredge (lead guitar), Joe Morgan (bass guitar), Derek George (rhythm guitar, background vocals), Ken Fleming (drums), and Bryan Culpepper (keyboards, background vocals). Signed to Liberty Records in 1993, the band would record two albums: 1993's Find out What's Happening, followed by a self-titled album one year later. This later album replaced Fleming with Steve Argo who was picked by Fleming to be his replacement after Fleming decided to leave the band, and Culpepper with Gary Schiera. The first album also produced a minor hit single on the Billboard Hot Country Singles & Tracks (now Hot Country Songs) charts in the single "Fool to Fall". After disbanding in 1994, some members of Pearl River served as a backing band for Bryan White.

== Biography ==
Pearl River was founded in the early 1990s in Philadelphia, Mississippi. In 1993. Later that year while working with Marty Gamblin of Glen Campbell’s publishing company, they were discovered by a representative of Capitol Records, who signed the band to the record's Liberty Records division. Their first album, entitled Find Out What's Happening, was issued that year and was produced by Jerry Crutchfield. It produced one chart single, "Fool to Fall", which peaked at No. 62 on the Billboard Hot Country Singles & Tracks charts. The title track was originally released by Bobby Bare in 1968 and late released as single for Tanya Tucker from her album Fire to Fire. Also included on this album was the song "Cast Iron Heart", which would later be recorded by Blackhawk on their 1996 album Strong Enough and by Linda Davis on her 1996 album Some Things Are Meant to Be.

Pearl River, was issued in 1994, under the production of Steve Gibson. Its only single, "Hello Goodbye", failed to enter the charts. This album featured two more tracks which would later be recorded by other artists: "You've Always Got Me", later found on Aaron Tippin's 1995 album Tool Box (which was also produced by Steve Gibson), and "Heartbroke Every Day", which Lonestar recorded on their 1995 album Lonestar and released as a single in 1996.

After Pearl River disbanded in 1994, several of its members were recruited as a backing band for Bryan White, who had previously worked as a T-shirt vendor for the band. By 1994, White was signed to a recording contract with Asylum Records. Former guitarist Derek George also co-wrote several of Bryan's singles, in addition to producing White's albums. He also made an appearance on Steve Wariner's 1996 album No More Mr. Nice Guy on the track "The Brickyard Boogie", for which he received a Grammy Award nomination in 1997. White and George also co-wrote Diamond Rio's 1998 single "Imagine That," and worked as a session musician before forming the band Williams Riley. After Williams Riley disbanded, George became a producer for Joe Nichols and Randy Houser.

== Find Out What's Happening ==
Find Out What's Happening

Studio album by Pearl River
- Released: April 26, 1993
- Studios: Sound Stage Studios, Studio 6, Nashville TN
- Genre: Country
- Label: Liberty
- Producer: Jerry Crutchfield

Pearl River chronology
''Find Out What's Happening'' (1993)	Pearl River (1994)

Singles from Find Out What's Happening
- 1. "Fool to Fall" Released: March 1993; 2. "Find Out What's Happening" Released: July 1993

=== Track listing ===
No.	Title	Length
1.	"I Wanna Be in the Picture" (Bob Merrill, J.P. Pennington)	2:46
2.	"Hole Where the Heart Oughta Be" (Jim Rushing, Randy Scruggs)	3:00
3.	"Does She Need Me" (Ken Fleming, Derek George, Jeff Stewart, Jim Weatherly)	3:09
4.	"Find Out What's Happening" (Jerry Crutchfield)	3:16
5.	"Cast Iron Heart" (Dennis Linde)	3:02
6.	"That Ole Gravel Road" (Billy Lawson, Roger Murrah)	3:17
7.	"Fool to Fall" (Larry Stewart, Wood Newton)	4:03
8.	"She's Already Earned Her Wings" (Marc Beeson, Robert Ellis Orrall)	2:59
9.	"Good Thing Going" (Vicki Gossett, Ronnie Gossett)	3:02
10.	"Josephine" (Craig Bickhardt)	2:50

=== Personnel ===
Pearl River

- Bryan Culpepper - keyboards, background vocals
- Chuck Ethredge - lead guitar
- Ken Fleming - drums
- Derek George - acoustic guitar, background vocals
- Joe Morgan - bass guitar
- Jeff Stewart - lead vocals

Additional musicians

- Bryan Culpepper - background vocals
- Dan Dugmore - pedal steel guitar
- Sonny Garrish - pedal steel guitar
- Steve Gibson - acoustic guitar, electric guitar
- Gray Gordon - background vocals
- Gregory Gordon - background vocals
- Mike Lawler - synthesizer
- Paul Leim - drums, percussion
- Terry McMillan - harmonica
- Wayland Patton - background vocals
- Michael Rhodes - bass guitar
- Matt Rollings - piano, synthesizer
- Brent Rowan - electric guitar
- Curtis Young - background vocals
- Jonathan Yudkin - fiddle

== Pearl River ==
Pearl River

Studio album by Pearl River
- Released: July 26, 1994
- Genre: Country
- Label: Liberty
- Producer: Steve Gibson

Pearl River chronology
Find Out What's Happening (1993)	''Pearl River'' (1994)

Singles from Pearl River
- 1. "Hello Goodbye" Released: June 1994

=== Track listing ===
No.	Title	Length
1.	"Hello Goodbye" (Lonnie Wilson, Kim Williams)	2:52
2.	"Don't Know Much About Love" (John Hiatt)	3:39
3.	"How Quick I Remember" (Wilson, Tom Shapiro, Chris Waters)	3:21
4.	"You've Always Got Me" (Walt Aldridge, Brad Crisler)	2:51
5.	"Nowhere Road" (Jeff Crossan)	3:46
6.	"Heartbroke Every Day" (Bill LaBounty, Rick Vincent, Cam King)	3:03
7.	"Good Way to Get Hurt" (Wilson, Williams, Collin Raye, Tammy Hyler)	3:54
8.	"Mr. Right Now" (Steve Dean, Danny "Bear" Mayo, Bill McCorvey)	4:01
9.	"Not After You" (John Jarrard, Wendell Mobley, Jeff Stewart)	3:20
10.	"Cows" (Gordon Kennedy)	2:27

=== Personnel ===
Pearl River

- Steve Argo - drums
- Chuck Ethredge - lead guitar
- Derek George - acoustic guitar, background vocals
- Joe Morgan - bass guitar
- Gary Schiera - keyboards, background vocals
- Jeff Stewart - lead vocals

Additional musicians

- Bob Bailey - background vocals
- Eddie Bayers - drums
- Kim Fleming - background vocals
- Paul Franklin - steel guitar
- Steve Gibson - acoustic guitar, electric guitar, background vocals
- Mitch Humphries - piano
- Brent Mason - electric guitar
- Steve Nathan - keyboards, Hammond B-3 organ
- Michael Rhodes - bass guitar
- Harry Stinson - background vocals
- Billy Thomas - background vocals
- Steve Wills - background vocals
- Lonnie Wilson - drums

== Singles ==
Year	Single	Peak chart positions		Album
Year	Single	US Country	CAN Country	Album
1993	"Fool to Fall"	62	83	Find Out What's Happening
1993	"Find Out What's Happening"	—	—	Find Out What's Happening
1994	"Hello Goodbye"	—	—	Pearl River
"—" denotes releases that did not chart

== Music videos ==
Year	Video	Director
1993	"Fool to Fall"	Roger Pistole
1994	"Hello Goodbye"	Joanne Gardner
