= Sittin' on Go =

Single by Bryan White

from the album Between Now and Forever
- Released: February 24, 1997
- Recorded: 1995
- Genre: Country
- Length: 3:08
- Label: Asylum
- Songwriters: Rick Bowles; Josh Leo
- Producers: Billy Joe Walker Jr.; Kyle Lehning

Bryan White singles chronology
"That's Another Song" (1996)	"Sittin' on Go" (1997)	"Love Is the Right Place" (1997)

"Sittin' on Go" is a song written by Rick Bowles and Josh Leo, and recorded by American country music singer Bryan White. It was released in February 1997 as the fourth and final single from his album Between Now and Forever. The song reached the top of the Billboard Hot Country Singles & Tracks (now Hot Country Songs) chart, giving White his fourth and final number one single.

== Content ==
The song is an up-tempo in which the narrator is addressing his lover, who is reluctant to begin a relationship with him. The narrator, who wants to begin the relationship, tells her that he is ready for her to give in, and is "sittin' on go" until she is ready.

The verses are in the key of A major, with a modulation upward to B major on the chorus.

== Critical reception ==
Robert Eisele of The Kansas City Star wrote that the song was "easily digested and just as easily forgotten". A review of the song in Radio & Records wrote that "Judicious use of an electric guitar's whammy bar opens the latest hook-laden single".

== Chart positions ==
"Sittin' on Go" debuted at number 75 on the U.S. Billboard Hot Country Singles & Tracks for the chart week of March 1, 1997.

Chart (1997)	Peak position
Canada Country Singles (RPM)	1
US Hot Country Songs (Billboard)	1

=== Year-end charts ===
Chart (1997)	Position
Canada Country Tracks (RPM)	24
US Country Songs (Billboard)	19

== Personnel ==
The following musicians played on this track.

- Eddie Bayers – drums, percussion
- Paul Franklin – pedal steel guitar
- Brent Mason – electric guitar
- Steve Nathan – organ
- John Wesley Ryles – background vocals
- Billy Joe Walker, Jr. – acoustic guitar
- Bryan White - lead vocals, background vocals
- Dennis Wilson – background vocals
- Glenn Worf – bass guitar, fuzz bass
- Curtis Young – background vocals
