= Fighting Fire with Fire =

Studio album by Davis Daniel
- Released: August 27, 1991
- Genre: Country
- Length: 30:38
- Label: Mercury/Polygram
- Producer: Ron Haffkine

Davis Daniel chronology
| Fighting Fire with Fire (1991) | Davis Daniel (1994) |

Singles from Fighting Fire with Fire
- 1. "Picture Me" Released: May 11, 1991; 2. "For Crying Out Loud" Released: August 31, 1991; 3. "Fighting Fire with Fire" Released: January 4, 1992; 4. "I Still Got a Crush on You" Released: May 9, 1992

Professional ratings
Review scores
| Source | Rating |
|---|---|
| Entertainment Weekly | (B) |

Fighting Fire with Fire is the debut studio album by American country music artist Davis Daniel, released in 1991 via Mercury Records. Its title track was one of the album's four singles, along with "Picture Me", "For Crying Out Loud" and "Still Got a Crush on You". "For Crying Out Loud" was the highest-peaking of these three, reaching #13 on the Hot Country Songs charts in 1991.

== Track listing ==
| No. | Title | Writer(s) | Length |
|---|---|---|---|
| 1. | "For Crying Out Loud" | Jimmy Compton, Phillip W. Wood | 2:25 |
| 2. | "Picture Me" | Brian R. Shaw, Mentor Williams | 3:27 |
| 3. | "Fighting Fire with Fire" | Michael White, Conley White | 3:14 |
| 4. | "Across the Room to You" | Don White | 2:31 |
| 5. | "Love Me" | Jerry Leiber, Mike Stoller | 3:29 |
| 6. | "Still Got a Crush on You" | Dean Dillon, Paul Overstreet | 2:32 |
| 7. | "No Place to Go" | Larry Alderman, M. White, C. White | 2:59 |
| 8. | "I Ain't the One" | Margie Bowes, C. White | 3:31 |
| 9. | "One of Those Days" | Shaw | 3:25 |
| 10. | "Down on My Knees" | Davis Daniel, James L. Latimer, C. White | 3:05 |

== Personnel ==
Musicians

- Bobby All - acoustic guitar
- Eddie Bayers - drums
- Mike Chapman - bass guitar
- Eric Daniel - snuff can, shaker
- Rick Durrett - synthesizer
- Ronnie Godfrey - piano, synthesizer
- Rob Hajacos - fiddle
- Leo Jackson - acoustic guitar
- Brent Mason - electric guitar
- Barry Paul - acoustic guitar
- Gary Prim - piano
- Michael Rhodes - bass guitar
- Tom Robb - bass guitar
- Hargus "Pig" Robbins - piano
- Brent Rowan - acoustic guitar, electric guitar
- Larry Sasser - steel guitar
- Michael Severs - acoustic guitar
- Pat Severs - acoustic guitar
- Milton Sledge - drums
- Jeff Williams - hubcap, background vocals ("Across the Room to You" only)
- Curtis Young - background vocals (all tracks)

Technical

- Bobby Bradley - engineering
- Ron Haffkine - producer
- Denny "Cobra" Knight - recording, mixing
- Benny Quinn - mastering

== Chart performance ==
| Chart (1991) | Peak position |
|---|---|
| U.S. Billboard Top Country Albums | 54 |
| U.S. Billboard Top Heatseekers | 26 |
| Canadian RPM Country Albums | 19 |
