= Davis Daniel =

American country music artist (born 1961)

- Born: Robert Andrykowski; March 1, 1961 (age 65)
- Origin: Arlington Heights, Illinois, U.S.
- Genres: Country
- Occupations: Singer; Songwriter
- Instrument: Vocals
- Years active: 1990–2001
- Labels: Mercury Nashville; Polydor Nashville; A&M Nashville

Robert Andrykowski (born March 1, 1961) is an American country music artist who records under the name Davis Daniel. Between 1991 and 1996, he recorded three studio albums on various divisions of Polygram Records: 1991's Fighting Fire with Fire, 1994's Davis Daniel, and 1995's I Know a Place. In that same time span, seven of his singles entered the Billboard Hot Country Singles & Tracks (now Hot Country Songs) charts, including the Top 40 hits "Picture Me", "For Crying Out Loud" and "Fighting Fire with Fire."

== Biography ==
Robert Andrykowski was born in Arlington Heights, Illinois, on March 1, 1961. Over time, his family moved to Nebraska, and subsequently to Denver, Colorado.

As a teenager, he found work singing at various nightclubs throughout Denver, Colorado. By the late 1980s, he moved to Nashville, Tennessee, eventually adopting the stage name Davis Daniel and landing a record deal with Mercury/Polygram Records in 1991 with the help of his music producer Ron Haffkine.

Fighting Fire with Fire was issued that year. It produced four singles on the country charts: "Picture Me" at number 28, followed by "For Crying Out Loud" at number 13, the title track at number 27 and "Still Got a Crush on You" at number 48. Alanna Nash of Entertainment Weekly gave the album a B rating, comparing Daniel's vocal technique to that of Keith Whitley and saying that he showed promise in carrying on in Whitley's tradition.

Daniel's second album, the self-titled Davis Daniel, followed in 1994 on Polydor Records. Its singles, "I Miss Her Missing Me," "William and Mary" and "Tyler," all peaked outside the top 40 in the United States, although "Tyler" reached number 39 on the RPM charts in Canada. "I Miss Her Missing Me" had been released by Mercury, which had originally planned to release the album in 1993 under the title Undeniable before Mercury underwent a management change that resulted in Daniel moving to Polydor. Cub Koda of Allmusic gave the album three stars out of five, saying, "there's enough good stuff here to make you think that he might develop into something more than a one-shot artist." New Country magazine's Michael McCall gave the album two-and-a-half stars out of five, praising the lyrics of "Tyler" and "Out Here Sits the King", but criticizing the other songs for lacking substance.

For his third album, Daniel moved to A&M Records. This album, I Know a Place, was released in 1996. Its lead-off single "I'm Not Listening Anymore" was part of a "Mystery Artist" contest on Country Music Television (CMT), which showed two versions of the song's music video: one where Daniel's face was obscured, and another where it was shown plainly. This single did not enter the charts.

After his third album, Daniel mostly stayed at home with his wife and children. He resumed touring in 2001 with a band called Big Heart, and released a new single called "Is It Just Me?"

== Discography ==
=== Albums ===
Title	Album details	Peak chart positions		
Title	Album details	US Country	US Heat	CAN Country
Fighting Fire with Fire	Release date: August 27, 1991; Label: Mercury Nashville; Format: CD, cassette	54	26	19
Davis Daniel	Release date: October 4, 1994; Label: Polydor Nashville; Format: CD, cassette	—	—	—
I Know a Place	Release date: June 18, 1996; Label: A&M Nashville; Format: CD, cassette	—	—	—
"—" denotes releases that did not chart

=== Singles ===
Year	Single	Peak chart positions		Album
Year	Single	US Country	CAN Country	Album
1991	"Picture Me"	28	—	Fighting Fire with Fire
1991	"For Crying Out Loud"	13	21	Fighting Fire with Fire
1992	"Fighting Fire with Fire"	27	44	Fighting Fire with Fire
1992	"Still Got a Crush on You"	48	76	Fighting Fire with Fire
1994	"I Miss Her Missing Me"	74	—	Davis Daniel
1994	"William and Mary"	64	—	Davis Daniel
1995	"Tyler"	58	39	Davis Daniel
1996	"I'm Not Listening Anymore"	—	—	I Know a Place
2001	"Is It Just Me?"	—	—	—N/a
"—" denotes releases that did not chart

=== Music videos ===
Year	Video	Director
1991	"Picture Me"	Michael Merriman
1991	"For Crying Out Loud"	Michael Merriman
1992	"Fighting Fire with Fire"	Marc Ball
1992	"Still Got a Crush on You"	
1994	"I Miss Her Missing Me"	Michael Merriman
1994	"William and Mary"	
1995	"Tyler"	Bill Young, Jim Barham
1996	"I'm Not Listening Anymore"	
