= Derek George =

American singer-songwriter

- Born: Philadelphia, Mississippi
- Origin: Nashville, Tennessee
- Genres: Country
- Occupations: Singer-songwriter, record producer
- Instruments: Vocals, guitar
- Years active: 1992–present
- Labels: Liberty, Golden
- Formerly of: Pearl River, Williams Riley

Derek George (born in Philadelphia, Mississippi) is an American country music singer, songwriter, and guitarist currently signed to Spirit Music Group. He is known for his work in Pearl River and Williams Riley, and his frequent collaborations with Bryan White.

== Musical career ==
In the 1990s, George was a member of the band Pearl River. After that band lost its recording contract, George and some of the other band members were recruited for Bryan White's road band. At the time, White was a merchandise vendor for Pearl River and was also a roommate of George's who had just begun his own music career.

George also co-wrote and sang backing vocals for several songs on White's first three albums, including the number-one single "So Much for Pretending".

In 1996, George and White, along with Bryan Austin and Jeffrey Steele, appeared on the song "Brickyard Boogie" on Steve Wariner's No More Mr. Nice Guy. This song was nominated for the Best Country Instrumental at the 1997 Grammy Awards.

George, White, and John Tirro also wrote Diamond Rio's 1997 single "Imagine That". While still a member of White's band in 2001, George signed with Windswept Publishing.

Between 2009 and 2010, George was a member of the band Williams Riley. In 2013, George produced Randy Houser's How Country Feels and Joe Nichols' Crickets.
