= Skip Ewing =

American country music singer-songwriter (born 1964)

- Born: Donald Ralph Ewing; March 6, 1964 (age 62)
- Origin: Redlands, California, United States
- Genres: Country
- Occupation: Singer-songwriter
- Instruments: Vocals, guitar, banjo, piano
- Years active: 1988–present
- Labels: MCA; Capitol; Word; Write!
- Website: skipewing.com

Donald Ralph "Skip" Ewing (born March 6, 1964) is an American country music singer and songwriter. Active since 1988, Ewing has recorded nine studio albums and has charted 15 singles on the Billboard country charts.

== Career ==
Ewing was born in Redlands, California, United States. He first began to gain national attention during the mid-1980s, both as a songwriter and recording artist for MCA and Capitol Records. His 1988 debut, The Coast of Colorado, produced the number 3 hit "Burnin' a Hole in My Heart" and four other top 20 country hits. The Will to Love included the top 5 hit "It's You Again". Although none of Ewing's subsequent chart entries made the Top 40, he released eight more albums from 1990 to 2009.

Ewing is a notable attendee of Columbine High School in Jefferson County, Colorado, and Redlands High School in Redlands, California.

In 1990, Ewing wrote two songs for Kenny Rogers' album Love Is Strange: "Listen to the Rain" and "If I Were a Painting".

In 2008, he served as the duet partner of the radio version of Reba McEntire's single, "Every Other Weekend". He also co-wrote the single; the song reached the Top 20 on the Billboard Country Chart. Although the song was credited for one week to Ewing and Kenny Chesney as ""Every Other Weekend" by Reba McEntire and Skip Ewing or Kenny Chesney", the song was thereafter credited to McEntire alone on the chart.

== Awards ==
- Broadcast Music Incorporated (BMI) Songwriter of the Year 2000;
- Nashville Songwriters Association International (NSAI) Song of the Year;
- Country Music Association (CMA) Triple Play Award (three No. 1 songs within 12 months).

Additionally, Ewing has received a CMA Song of the Year nomination, a Grammy nomination, a Tony nomination and multiple BMI "Million Air" awards.

== Horse and Writer ==
Horse and Writer is an annual songwriting retreat Skip Ewing organizes every year with members of the Nashville songwriting community. The retreat lasts six days, and takes place at the Triangle C Ranch in Dubois, Wyoming. The mission is to help aspiring songwriters realize their potential, as they are mentored by experienced pros like Ewing, who describes the event as "a labor of love."

== Discography ==
=== Studio albums ===
Title	Album details	Peak positions
Title	Album details	US Country
The Coast of Colorado	Release date: April 4, 1988; Label: MCA Records	29
The Will to Love	Release date: September 19, 1989; Label: MCA Records	44
A Healin' Fire	Release date: July 24, 1990; Label: MCA Records	—
Following Yonder Star	Release date: October 2, 1990; Label: MCA Records	—
Naturally	Release date: July 2, 1991; Label: Capitol Nashville	—
Homegrown Love	Release date: March 23, 1993; Label: Liberty Records	—
Until I Found You	Release date: April 29, 1997; Label: Word Records	—
Indian Elephant Tea (The Big Kidz Band featuring Skip Ewing)	Release date: July 31, 2001; Label: Write! Records	—
Wyoming	Release date: August 21, 2020; Label: Write! Records	—
"—" denotes releases that did not chart

=== Compilation albums ===
Title	Album details
Greatest Hits	Release date: August 13, 1991; Label: MCA Records
Hits Volume One	Release date: December 10, 2009; Label: Write! Records

=== Singles ===
Year	Single	Peak positions		Album
Year	Single	US Country	CAN Country	Album
1988	"Your Memory Wins Again"	17	—	The Coast of Colorado
1988	"I Don't Have Far to Fall"	8	—	The Coast of Colorado
1988	"Burnin' a Hole in My Heart"	3	5	The Coast of Colorado
1989	"The Gospel According to Luke"	10	11	The Coast of Colorado
1989	"The Coast of Colorado"	15	24	The Coast of Colorado
1989	"It's You Again"	5	9	The Will to Love
1990	"If a Man Could Live on Love Alone"	70	—	The Will to Love
1990	"I'm Your Man"	69	77	A Healin' Fire
1990	"The Dotted Line"	—	80	A Healin' Fire
1991	"I Get the Picture"	73	—	Naturally
1992	"Naturally"	71	84	Naturally
1993	"Losing You Is New to Me"	—	78	Homegrown Love
1993	"Grandma's Garden"	—	84	Homegrown Love
1995	"Christmas Carol" (Note: "Christmas Carol" also peaked on Hot Country Songs at number 60 in 1998 and number 44 in 2000.)	68	—	Following Yonder Star
1997	"Mary Go 'Round"	58	—	Until I Found You
1997	"Answer to My Prayer"	66	—	Until I Found You
2023	"Knots"	—	—	Road to California
2026	"Me & God and a Fishing Hole"	—	—	TBA
"—" denotes releases that did not chart

==== As a featured artist ====
Year	Single	Peak positions		Album
Year	Single	US Country	US Bubbling	Album
2008	"Every Other Weekend" (Reba McEntire with Skip Ewing) (Note: The radio edit of "Every Other Weekend" featured Skip Ewing as a duet partner, while the version on McEntire's Reba: Duets album features Kenny Chesney. The song was only credited to Ewing for one week, at which point it had reached No. 57 on Hot Country Songs.)	15	4	Reba: Duets

=== Music videos ===
Year	Video	Director
1988	"Your Memory Wins Again"	Jim May
1988	"I Don't Have Far to Fall"	Jim May
1990	"If a Man Could Live on Love Alone"	John Lloyd Miller
1993	"Losing You is New to Me"	
1997	"Mary Go 'Round"	
1997	"Answer to My Prayer"	Chuck Shanlever

== Awards and nominations ==
=== As a recording artist ===
Year	Organization	Award	Nominee/Work	Result
1989	Academy of Country Music Awards	Top New Male Vocalist	Skip Ewing	Nominated
1990	American Music Awards	Favorite Country New Artist	Skip Ewing	Nominated
1990	TNN/Music City News Awards	Star of Tomorrow	Skip Ewing	Nominated
