= Bryan White =

American country music singer (born 1974)

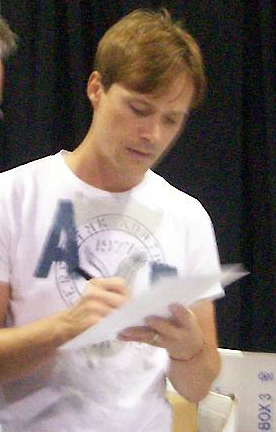
- Bryan White at CMA Music Festival in June 2010

Background information
- Born: Bryan Shelton White; February 17, 1974 (age 52); Lawton, Oklahoma, U.S.
- Genres: Country
- Occupations: Singer; songwriter
- Instruments: Vocals; guitar; drums
- Years active: 1994–2000; 2005–present
- Labels: Asylum; Warner Bros.; Just a Pup

Bryan Shelton White (born February 17, 1974) is an American country music singer and songwriter. Signed to Asylum Records in 1994 at age 20, White released his self-titled debut album that year. Both it and its follow-up, 1996's Between Now and Forever, were certified platinum by the Recording Industry Association of America, and 1997's The Right Place was certified gold. His fourth album, 1999's How Lucky I Am, produced two top 40 singles, with the song "God Gave Me You" eventually becoming a big hit in the Philippines.

White has charted 17 singles on the Billboard country charts, of which six reached number one: "Someone Else's Star" in 1995, Rebecca Lynn's "I'm Not Supposed to Love You Anymore", "From This Moment On" (with Shania Twain), and "So Much for Pretending" in 1996, and "Sittin' on Go" in 1997. "So Much for Pretending" was the most successful of these songs, spending two weeks at number one.

== Early life ==
White was born in Lawton, Oklahoma, in 1974, and raised in Oklahoma City. Raised by a musical family, White began playing the drums at age 5 through the instruction of his father. He also played in his mother's pop band and his father's country band as a teenager, and was encouraged to take up singing after his mother heard him sing during a sound check.

After moving to Nashville White sold T-shirts for the band Pearl River, in which his friend Derek George played guitar. The band regularly let White onstage to perform a song during their concerts. He also befriended two record producers: Billy Joe Walker, Jr. (who is also a session guitarist, songwriter, and Jazz musician) and Kyle Lehning, the latter of whom helped him sign a contract with Asylum Records in 1994.

== Recording career ==
=== Bryan White ===
White released his debut single "Eugene You Genius" in late 1994. Although it failed to reach Top 40 on the Hot Country Songs charts, his debut album was released under the production of Lehning and Walker. The next single, "Look at Me Now", peaked at number 24, followed by the consecutive number 1 hits "Someone Else's Star" and "Rebecca Lynn". The success of these latter two singles helped Bryan White achieve a platinum certification from the Recording Industry Association of America (RIAA) for shipments of one million copies. The album included two songs which would later be singles for other artists in 1997: "Nothin' Less Than Love" (recorded by The Buffalo Club) and "Going, Going, Gone" (recorded by Neal McCoy). Also in 1995, Sawyer Brown charted in the Top Five with "I Don't Believe in Goodbye", a song which White co-wrote with Scotty Emerick and Sawyer Brown lead singer Mark Miller. In 1996, White earned the Country Music Association's Horizon Award and the Academy of Country Music's Top New Male Vocalist award.

A review in the St. Petersburg Times said that the label "erred by releasing a novelty song as his first single" but added "the rest of Bryan White's debut album makes it clear that he has talent polish and promise." Tom Lanham of New Country magazine thought that the album showed promise despite White's age, while comparing his vocal delivery favorably to that of Vince Gill.

=== Between Now and Forever ===
White's second album, Between Now and Forever, was released in early 1996. Its lead-off, "I'm Not Supposed to Love You Anymore", reached number 1 on the country charts, followed by the number 1 "So Much for Pretending", the number 15 "That's Another Song", and his sixth number one hit, 1997's "Sittin' on Go". Like his debut album, Between Now and Forever was certified platinum. That same year, Diamond Rio charted in the Top 5 with "Imagine That", which White co-wrote with Derek George and John Tirro.

=== The Right Place ===
The Right Place followed in 1997. Its title track, "Love Is the Right Place", was a Top 5 hit, although later singles proved less successful. "One Small Miracle" peaked at 15, and "Bad Day to Let You Go" peaked in at 30 in 1998. The album earned a gold certification. Also in 1998, White contributed background vocals and made a guest appearance on Shania Twain's Top Ten country and pop hit "From This Moment On" released on Shania's 1997 album Come On Over, there are several edits of the song, both country and pop. The final single from The Right Place, "Tree of Hearts", failed to make Top 40. White followed up the album with a Christmas EP entitled Dreaming of Christmas. He also co-wrote Lila McCann's "You're Gone" with friend Steve Wariner and sang background vocals on the song with Steve Wariner and Vince Gill. Also in 1998, he was one of several artists to participate in a charity single entitled "One Heart at a Time".

=== How Lucky I Am and Greatest Hits ===
A fourth album for Asylum, How Lucky I Am, followed in 1999. Session guitarist and producer Dann Huff produced half of the album, and White co-produced the rest with Derek George. Both of its singles ("You're Still Beautiful To Me" and "God Gave Me You") were top 30 singles. White's label Asylum closed its Nashville division soon afterward. He then signed with Warner Bros. Records. WB issued a Greatest Hits album in 2000 on Warner Bros. Records. This album included the number 56 single "How Long".

White's 1999/2000 single "God Gave Me You" from the album How Lucky I Am became a massive hit in the Philippines 16 years after it was released due to its use of the AlDub love-team phenomenon which was vocally dubbed by Alden Richards and Maine Mendoza on the Kalyeserye segment of the noontime TV variety show Eat Bulaga!. The success of this song prompted White to visit the Philippines for the first time to perform a concert at the Smart Araneta Coliseum on December 1, 2015. White also performed the song on Eat Bulaga! and Sunday PinaSaya. He also visited the Catmon community in Manila with Food for the Hungry.

=== 2000s ===
Being so young in the 1990s and thrust into stardom so fast, White found that the industry's pressures ended up taking their toll. As White has stated, "I found myself being defined by my career and success and being pushed farther away from who I really was meant to be". With his fourth album being less commercially successful, he began doubting himself and his voice which landed him in a deep depression, forcing him to take some time off until 2005, when he began work on another album. A second Christmas EP, My Christmas Project, followed in 2006.

A new album, Dustbowl Dreams, was released on September 28, 2009. White released a new single from that album, "The Little Things", in July 2009. White said, "It was a record that I had to make. It's my most personal to date. "Dustbowl Dreams" was for my healing.."

=== 2012 New Music Project ===
On September 24, 2012, White launched a Kickstarter project for a new record which he planned to create without the help of a record label. On October 24, 2012, the Kickstarter project funding period closed. White raised $34,889 in total. On March 20, 2013, White announced to his Kickstarter backers that the album would at least include the following songs: "Another Day In The Sun," "Amen," "Born To Be Somebody," "Call Me Crazy," "Another Man's Shoes," and "What I Already Know." On June 17, 2013, in an update to his financial backers, White announced that the album would be called Shine. No album was ever released!

== Personal life ==
White is married to actress Erika Page White, and together they have two sons, Justin and Jackson. White's father was killed on October 5, 2016, in a car accident in Snyder, Oklahoma.

== Discography ==
- Bryan White (1994)
- Between Now and Forever (1996)
- The Right Place (1997)
- How Lucky I Am (1999)
- Greatest Hits (2000)
- Dustbowl Dreams (2009)

== Filmography ==
=== Films ===
Year	Title	Role	Notes
1985	The Boy Who Had Everything	College Runner	Credited as Brian White
1998	Quest for Camelot	Garrett (singing voice)	Voice; Animated film
1999	Stars Over Mississippi	Himself	TV movie

=== Television ===
Year	Title	Role	Notes
1996	The 31st Annual Academy of Country Music Awards	Himself	TV special
1996	The Bold and the Beautiful	Himself	TV series Credited as Brian White
1997	The Tonight Show with Jay Leno	Himself	TV series
1996-1998	Late Show with David Letterman	Himself	TV series
1998	Prime Time Country Celebrates 15 Years of TNN	Himself	TV special
1998	The 33rd Annual Academy of Country Music Awards	Himself	TV special
1999	The 34th Annual Academy of Country Music Awards	Himself	TV special
1999	Century of Country	Himself	TV miniseries
2001	The Chuck Isaak Show	Himself	1 episode TV series
2003	Grand Ole Opry	Himself	TV series
2003	Intimate Portrait	Himself	TV series
2011	The Country Vibe with Chuck and Becca	Himself	1 episode TV series Guest
