= 15 of the Best =

Compilation album by Anne Murray
- Released: May 2, 1992
- Genre: Country
- Length: 47:57
- Label: Liberty
- Producer: Brian Ahern; Jerry Crutchfield; Steve Dorff; David Foster; Jim Ed Norman

Anne Murray chronology
Yes I Do (1991)	15 of the Best (1992)	Croonin' (1993)

15 of the Best is a compilation album by Canadian Country singer Anne Murray. It was released by Liberty Records in the spring of 1992. The album peaked at number 62 on the Billboard Top Country Albums chart.

== Track listing ==
No.	Title	Writer(s)	Length
1.	"Shadows in the Moonlight"	Rory Bourke, Charlie Black
2.	"You Needed Me"	Randy Goodrum
3.	"Could I Have This Dance"	Wayland Holyfield, Bob House
4.	"Feed This Fire"	Hugh Prestwood
5.	"Blessed Are the Believers"	Black, Bourke, Sandy Pinkard
6.	"I Can See Arkansas"	James Nihan, Wood Newton
7.	"I Just Fall in Love Again"	Steve Dorff, Gloria Sklerov, Harry Lloyd, Lanny Herbstritt
8.	"New Way Out"	Randy Sharp
9.	"Snowbird"	Gene MacLellan
10.	"Danny's Song"	Kenny Loggins
11.	"Even the Nights Are Better"	J. L. Wallace, Terry Skinner, Ken Bell
12.	"A Little Good News"	Black, Bourke, Tommy Rocco
13.	"Just Another Woman in Love"	Patty Ryan, Wanda Mallette
14.	"Broken Hearted Me"	Goodrum
15.	"Oh Yes I Do"	Beth Nielsen Chapman, Kent Robbins

== Chart performance ==
Chart (1992)	Peak position
Canadian RPM Country Albums	17
U.S. Billboard Top Country Albums	62
