= Champ Hood =

American singer and multi-instrumentalist

- Birth name: Carroll DesChamps Hood
- Born: August 16, 1952; Spartanburg, South Carolina US
- Died: November 3, 2001 (aged 49); Austin, Texas US
- Genres: Alternative country Rock music Folk music
- Occupation: Singer-songwriter
- Years active: 1970s–2001
- Formerly of: Toni Price; Uncle Walt's Band; Lyle Lovett; Jimmie Dale Gilmore; Willis Alan Ramsey
- Website: champhood.com

Carroll DesChamps "Champ" Hood (August 16, 1952 – November 3, 2001) was an American singer and multi-instrumentalist. He was inducted into the Austin Music Memorial in 2011, the Austin Chronicle's Texas Music Hall of Fame in 2000, and was a five-time recipient of the Austin Best String Player Award.

== Early life ==
Hood grew up in Spartanburg, South Carolina. His mother was a housewife and his father owned a lumberyard. Hood learned to play Dobro resonator guitar in his early teens, then he played electric guitar in local band Washington Subway.

== Career ==
=== Early career ===
In his senior year of high school, Hood met Walter Hyatt. Their first collaboration was the Walter Hyatt Consort. When David Ball joined them, they formed Uncle Walt's Band. When they decided a fiddle player would be a good sound for their band, he learned to play the fiddle as an adult. Champ also had a vocal range of almost three octaves.

After moving to Nashville, in 1972 they met Willis Alan Ramsey, who persuaded them to perform and record in Texas. After that, they moved back to Spartanburg to record their eponymous debut record.

They disbanded in 1975 so they could form new bands. Hood and Hyatt returned to Nashville and performed in a band called the Contenders.

In 1978, they reunited with Ball to re-form Uncle Walt's Band. They appeared on Austin City Limits in 1980, then broke up again in 1983 to pursue solo careers.

=== Late 1970s and onward ===
In the late 70s and early 80s, Hood regularly performed at EmmaJoe's at the Alamo Hotel with Butch Hancock, David Rodriguez, Jimmie Dale Gilmore, and Ray Wylie Hubbard.

Hood performed with Lyle Lovett, Kelly Willis, and Guy Clark on guitar and fiddle. He also performed with Blaze Foley, Mandy Mercier, Sarah Elizabeth Campbell, and with David Halley.

For eleven years, in the late 80s and for most of the 90s, Hood performed with Jimmie Dale Gilmore's band in a weekly Wednesday night gig at Threadgill's. When Gilmore signed with a major label, Hood took over the Threadgill's Troubadours (Marvin Dykhuis, David Heath, and Ron Erwin) for a reincarnation of the Threadgill's Restaurant's Wednesday night Singin' and Supper Sessions.

Hood played in singer Toni Price's band for more than nine years. Price's Tuesday night "Hippie Hour" early show at the Continental Club also featured guitarists "Scrappy" Jud Newcomb, Rich Brotherton, and Rick "Casper" Rawls.

== Death and legacy ==
In spring of 2001, Hood was diagnosed with cancer. He was working on his first and only solo album when he died. Bon Haven was released posthumously on January 20, 2002.

Toni Price recorded her album Born to be Blue in 2003, with each song intended as a tribute to Champ Hood, with whom she had been so close.

Walter Hyatt died in 1996 in the ValuJet Flight 592 plane crash in the Everglades. After Uncle Walt's Band broke up the second time, David Ball went on to record successful country albums (beginning with Thinkin' Problem in 1994).

Hood's son Warren Hood is a multi-instrumentalist, songwriter and singer who toured as a member of The Waybacks. He has also performed and/or recorded with Lyle Lovett, Joan Osborne, Emmylou Harris, Little Feat, Elvis Costello, the Bodeans, Susan Tedeschi, Gillian Welch, and Alejandro Escovedo. His own band – Emily Gimble (keyboards, vocals), guitarist Willie Pipkin (guitar), Nate Rowe (bass), and Corey Keller (drums) – have recorded and toured extensively.

Champ's nephew Marshall Hood plays lead guitar in the Americana band The Belleville Outfit, with Toni Price, and with his own band, the Bads.

== Personal life ==
In 1982, Hood married Elizabeth Haynes. They had one son, Warren Hood. They divorced in 1985.

== Discography ==
=== Champ Hood ===
- 2002: Bon Haven (South Congress Records 1003)

=== Uncle Walt's Band ===
- 1974: Uncle Walt's Band – (self-released)
- 1980: An American in Texas (label)
- 1982: Recorded Live From the Waterloo Ice House (label)
- 1988: 6/26/79 – (initially released only on cassette)

=== Appears on ===
This is a partial list of recordings which feature Champ Hood as performer and/or composer.

- 1978: The Lost Gonzo Band – Signs of Life (Capitol Records SW-11788)
- 1982: Bill Oliver – Texas Oasis (Live Oak Records)
- 1989: Evan Johns and His H-Bombs – Bombs Away (Rykodisc RCD 10117)
- 1989: Jerry Jeff Walker – Live From Gruene Hall (Rykodisc 10123)
- 1989: Lyle Lovett – Lyle Lovett and His Large Band (MCA 42263)
- 1989: Tish Hinojosa – Homeland (A&M Records 395263-1)
- 1990: The Highwaymen – Live Texas Radio (Jungle 3003)
- 1991: Evan Johns and His H-Bombs – Please Mr. Santa Claus (Jungle Records JREP 4001)
- 1991: Various Artists – Threadgill's Supper Session (Watermelon Records CD 1013)
- 1992: Bad Livers – Delusions of Banjer (Quarterstick Records QS14CD)
- 1992: David Halley – Stray Dog Talk (Dos DOSCD 7007)
- 1992: Various Artists – Across the Great Divide: Songs of Jo Allen Pierce (Deja Disc DJD 3203)
- 1993: Don McCalister Jr. – Brand New Ways (Dejadisc DJD 3206)
- 1993: Jan Seides – Slowly But Surely (Sex String)
- 1993: Mandy Mercier – Forgiveness and Rage
- 1993: Toni Price – Swim Away (Discovery 77003)
- 1994: Dirk Hamilton – Yep! (Appaloosa – I.R.D AP 107-2)
- 1994: Jello Biafra and Mojo Nixon with The Toadliquors – Prairie Home Invasion (Alternative Tentacles VIRUS 137)
- 1994: Lisa Mednick – Artifacts of Love (Dejadisc DJD 3209)
- 1995: Ed Miller – At Home With the Exiles (Greentrax Recordings CDTRAX 089)
- 1995: The Keepers – Looking for a Sign (Lizard Disc 80003)
- 1995: Shakin' Apostles – Tucson (East Side Digital 80912)
- 1995: Ted Roddy – Full Circle (Hightone HCD 8065)
- 1995: Toni Price – Hey (Discovery 77022)
- 1995: Various Artists – Austin Country Nights (Watermelon 1039)
- 1995: Various Artists – Threadgill's Supper Session Second Helpings (Watermelon Records CD 1052)
- 1995: Walter Tragert – Heavy Just The Same (Club De Musique Records MRCD 1095)
- 1996: Peter Keane – Walkin' Around (Flying Fish FF 652)
- 1996: Walter Hyatt – King Tears (MCA AAMCAD11556)
- 1996: Various Artists – Luxury Liner Volume 1 (Glitterhouse Records GRCD 413)
- 1997: The Keepers – Every Dog Is a Star (Lizard LCD 80010)
- 1997: Loose Diamonds – Fresco Fiasco! (Freedom 1011)
- 1997: Richard Buckner – Devotion + Doubt(MCA Records MCAD 11564)
- 1997: Shakin' Apostles – Medicine Show (Blue Rose Records BLU CD0059)
- 1997: Toni Price – Sol Power (Discovery Records 74711P)
- 1997: Various Artists – Sidney: The Cat's Cradle
- 1998: Beaver Nelson – The Last Hurrah (Freedom 1019)
- 1998 Don McCalister Jr. – Down in Texas (Appaloosa APCD 131)
- 1998: Lyle Lovett – Step Inside This House (MCA MCAD 211831)
- 1998: Terry Clarke – Lucky (Appaloosa APCD 132)
- 1998: Various Artists – Kerrville Folk Festival: 25th Anniversary Album (Silverwolf Records PWSWC 1039)
- 1999: Blaze Foley – Live at the Austin Outhouse (Lost Arts Productions)
- 1999: Toni Price – Lowdown & Up (Antone's 10044)
- 1999: Walter Hyatt – Music Town (Sugar Hill SHCD 1039)
- 2000: The Barbers – The Barbers
- 2000: Chris Montgomery – You Know You Want It (Big Pants Records)
- 2000: The Contenders – Light From Carolina, Vol. 1 (Orchard 6723)
- 2000: Eric Hisaw – Thing About Trains (Saustex Media)
- 2000: The Hollisters – Sweet Inspiration (Rhino / Hightone HCD 8114)
- 2000: Lee Ann Atherton – Lady Liberty (Steppin Stone 458)
- 2000: Michael Hall and the Woodpeckers – Dead by Dinner (Blue Rose Records BLU CD0128)
- 2000: Various Artists – Travelin' Texas (Institute for the History of Texas Music IHTM001)
- 2001: Bill Pekar – The First Five Years (Big A Entertainment / Corn Fed 1209)
- 2001: Brad Brobisky – Painted Pony (Lizard Discs LCD 80012)
- 2001: Karen Abrahams – For the Love of the Song (BabyHead)
- 2001: James Hyland Band – Place I Call Home (Tin Roof 3405)
- 2001: Mandy Mercier – Wild Dreams of the Shy Boys (Wild Cantinas 92339)
- 2001: Quatropaw – Flight (Neptune Records)
- 2001: Terry Clarke – The Sound of the Moon (Appaloosa 146)
- 2001: Toni Price – Midnight Pumpkin (Texas Music Group 52)
- 2002: The Contenders – The Contenders (Gadfly 283) – reissue of 1978 album
- 2002: John Greenberg – Buffalo Nickels (Home Grown Music Network 3749)
- 2002: Linda Freeman – Every Open Door (Entwine 3)
- 2002: Mary Welch – Long Country Road
- 2002: Rodney Hayden – The Real Thing (Rosetta 2004)
- 2003: Ed Miller – Border Background (Folk-Legacy CD115)
- 2005: Leti Delavega – La Primera (Deep South 10)
- 2006: Various Artists – If I Could Only Fly: A Tribute to Blaze Foley (Borderdreams 0004)
- 2007: Mandy Mercier – Run out of Darkness (Wild Cantinas)
