= Talk Memphis =

Talk Memphis may refer to:

- Talk Memphis, a 2007 album by Toni Price
- Talk Memphis, an album by Jesse Winchester from which Price's album gets its name
