= Walter Hyatt =

American songwriter

- Born: Walter Hyatt; October 25, 1949; Spartanburg, South Carolina, U.S.
- Died: May 11, 1996 (aged 46); Dade County, Florida, U.S.
- Cause of death: Plane crash
- Occupations: Singer, songwriter
- Spouse: Heidi
- Children: 3

Walter Hyatt (October 25, 1949 – May 11, 1996) was an American singer and songwriter. His group, Uncle Walt's Band, was involved in the alternative music scene in Austin, Texas.

== Early life ==
Born in Spartanburg, South Carolina, Walter Hyatt was exposed to different styles of music at an early age. He started playing the guitar at age 13 and formed his first band in his midteen years. Hyatt attended Wofford College for two years but left before graduating to pursue his music career.

== Music career ==
At age 20, Hyatt formed Uncle Walt's Band with Champ Hood and David Ball. In 1972, they moved to Nashville, Tennessee, where they caught the attention of Texas singer/songwriter Willis Alan Ramsey.

The band returned to Spartanburg, South Carolina in 1974, recording Blame It on the Bossanova, their first record, at Arthur Smith Studios in nearby Charlotte, North Carolina. The band released the record on their own Lespedeza Records label. A year later, Uncle Walt's Band split up, with Hyatt returning to Nashville and forming a new band, The Contenders, with Hood and Nashville musicians Steve Runkle, Tommy Goldsmith, and Jimbeau Walsh.

In 1978, Uncle Walt's Band reunited. They released three more albums on their own Lespedeza Records label between 1980 and 1988: An American in Texas, Uncle Walt's Band Recorded Live, and Six * Twenty-Six * Seventy-Nine. The group broke up again in 1983, but continued to perform occasional shows through 1993 as the members pursue their solo careers in Austin and Nashville.

In 1985, Hyatt released his first solo recording on Lespedeza Records, a cassette EP titled Fall Through to You. In 1987, Hyatt returned to Nashville with his wife, Heidi, and continued pursuing his career as a solo performer and songwriter. Hyatt's songs at this point had been recorded by several major label artists, including B. J. Thomas ("Aloha"), Jerry Jeff Walker ("Deeper Than Love"), The Lost Gonzo Band ("Getaway"), and Dana Cooper ("Rollin' My Blues"), and living in Nashville allowed Hyatt greater access to the country music producers and performers who were a market for his songs.

In 1990, Hyatt released his first full-length solo album, King Tears, on the MCA Master Series label (his was the first vocal album in the Master Series catalog). The album was produced by Lyle Lovett, who had first encountered Hyatt while attending an Uncle Walt's Band show as a college student. Hyatt later toured as an opening act for Lovett. In 1993, Hyatt released his second solo album, Music Town, on Sugar Hill Records.

Hyatt began work on a third solo album in 1995, and during that year and into the next he recorded more than 40 song demos as a part of the preproduction process. These recordings were the basis of two CDs produced by Heidi Hyatt in 2008-2009, both titled Some Unfinished Business. The studio production of these recordings was completed in the 2000s by a variety of musicians and arrangers who worked with Heidi Hyatt and associate producer David Dorris.

== Death ==
Hyatt died in the crash of ValuJet Airlines Flight 592 on May 11, 1996. He was 46. He was survived by his wife Heidi and their two children, Taylor and Rose Evelyn, and Walter's daughter Haley.

== Tributes ==
In 1997, an episode of the PBS show Austin City Limits featured a tribute to Hyatt by Lovett, Junior Brown, Shawn Colvin, Allison Moorer, Marcia Ball, Willis Alan Ramsey, Jimmie Dale Gilmore, and Uncle Walt's Band members Champ Hood and David Ball.

In 2008, the Austin Music Awards featured a tribute with Lovett, Ball, Champ Hood's son Warren Hood, and Champ Hood's nephew Marshall Hood of The Belleville Outfit.
