= Freewheeler (album) =

Studio album by David Ball
- Released: November 16, 2004
- Recorded: 2004 at Rope-A-Note Studio
- Genre: Country
- Length: 40:29
- Label: Wildcatter
- Producer: Wood Newton

David Ball chronology
Amigo (2001)	Freewheeler (2004)	Heartaches by the Number (2007)

Freewheeler is the sixth studio album released by American country music singer David Ball. It was released in 2004 on the independent Wildcatter label. The lead-off single, "Louisiana Melody", charted at #59 on the Billboard country charts in 2004. It was followed by "Happy With the One I've Got" and "Too Much Blood in My Alcohol Level", neither of which charted. The track "I Can See Arkansas" was previously recorded by Steve Wariner on his 1990 album Laredo.

Professional ratings
Review scores
Source	Rating
Allmusic	link

== Track listing ==
1. "Louisiana Melody" (David Ball, Allen Shamblin) – 2:52
2. "Happy With the One I've Got" (Wood Newton, Rand Bishop) – 3:21
3. "Nobody Told Me" (Gary Cotton, John Wiggins) – 2:55
4. "Tell Me With Your Heart" (Ball, Chris Carmichael) – 4:03
5. "I Can See Arkansas" (Newton, James Nihan) – 3:27
6. "Too Much Blood in My Alcohol Level" (Newton, Mark Alan Barnett) – 2:50
7. "Desert Luau" (Danny Baker) – 3:00
8. "Mr. Teardrop" (Ball) – 3:46
9. "Yours Truly Blue" (Ball, Carmichael) – 3:23
10. "A Girl I Use to Know" (Ball) – 3:21
11. "Violence and Lies" (Newton) – 3:30
12. "Freewheeler" (Jesse Winchester) – 4:01

== Personnel ==
- David Ball - lead vocals
- Vince Barranco - drums
- Chris Carmichael - fiddle
- J.T. Corenflos - electric guitar
- Dan Frizsell - bass guitar
- Mike Johnson - pedal steel guitar
- Billy Linneman - bass guitar
- Kim Morrison - background vocals
- Wood Newton - background vocals
- Billy Panda - acoustic guitar, electric guitar, ukulele
- Alison Prestwood - bass guitar
- Mike Rojas - piano
- Milton Sledge - drums
- Jeff Taylor - piano, accordion
- Russell Terrell - background vocals
