= They Don't Make Them Like They Used To =

Studio album by Kenny Rogers
- Released: 3 November 1986
- Recorded: 1986
- Studio: Garden Rake Studio (Sherman Oaks, California); Conway Studios (Hollywood, California); Can-Am Recorders (Tarzana, California); House of Gold and The Garage (Nashville, Tennessee)
- Genre: Country, West Coast sound
- Length: 41:44
- Label: RCA Victor
- Producer: Jay Graydon; Burt Bacharach; Carole Bayer Sager; Kenny Mims; David Malloy

Kenny Rogers chronology
Short Stories (1985)	They Don't Make Them Like They Used To (1986)	I Prefer the Moonlight (1987)

Singles from They Don't Make Them Like They Used To
- 1. "They Don't Make Them Like They Used To" Released: 1986; 2. "Twenty Years Ago" Released: January 5, 1987

Professional ratings
Review scores
Source	Rating
AllMusic	link

They Don't Make Them Like They Used To (also referred to as They Don't Make 'Em...) is the nineteenth studio album by American country music artist Kenny Rogers, released in 1986 through RCA Records. The album hit the top 20 on the country charts (and crossed over into the pop Billboard 200) with the single "Twenty Years Ago" peaked at number two on the Hot Country chart and #15 on the Adult Contemporary chart.

The title track was used as the theme song to the box office hit movie Tough Guys and released as a single at the end of 1986. The song only reached number 53 in the country charts although it did well by hitting the Top 10 and Top 20 on the adult contemporary charts. The song "You're My Love" was written by Prince under the pseudonym "Joey Coco" and features El DeBarge on backing vocals.

== Track listing ==
They Don't Make Them Like They Used To track listing
No.	Title	Writer(s)	Producer	Length
1.	"This Love We Share"	Jay Graydon; David Malloy	Graydon; Malloy	4:32
2.	"If I Could Hold On to Love"	Randy Goodrum; Steve Lukather	Graydon	4:16
3.	"You're My Love"	Joey Coco	Graydon	4:09
4.	"Time for Love"	Anthony LaPeau; Randy Stern	Graydon	3:24
5.	"They Don't Make Them Like They Used To" (Theme from Tough Guys)	Burt Bacharach; Carole Bayer Sager	Bacharach; Sager	4:32
6.	"Life Is Good, Love Is Better"	Malloy; Stephen Allen Davis; Dennis Morgan	Graydon; Malloy	3:59
7.	"Just the Thought of Losing You"	Michael Bolton; Jonathan Cain	Graydon	4:14
8.	"Anything at All"	Dave Loggins	Graydon	4:36
9.	"After All This Time"	Steve Dorff; Peter Beckett	Graydon	4:18
10.	"Twenty Years Ago"	Wood Newton; Mike Noble; Michael Spriggs; Dan Tyler	Graydon; Kenny Mims	3:44
Total length:				41:44

== Personnel ==
=== Musicians and vocals ===
- Kenny Rogers – vocals
- Robbie Buchanan – synthesizers (1, 3, 7, 9, 10), acoustic piano (3, 4, 7, 9)
- Jay Graydon – synthesizers (1, 2, 7, 8, 10), lead guitar (1, 4), electronic drums (1, 2, 8), guitar solo (2, 9), drums (6), guitar lines (9)
- Randy Goodrum – synthesizers (2), electronic drums (2)
- Steve Lukather – synthesizers (2), rhythm guitar (2)
- Michael Omartian – synthesizers (4, 7)
- Marcus Ryle – synthesizers (4, 7)
- Michael Boddicker – synthesizers (5)
- Randy Kerber – keyboards (5, 6)
- Mike Lawler – keyboards (6)
- Michael Hanna – synthesizers (10)
- Paul Urrich – keyboards (10)
- Michael Landau – rhythm guitar (1, 4, 9), guitars (3, 7)
- Dann Huff – guitars (5)
- Billy Joe Walker Jr. – guitars (6)
- Kenny Mims – guitars (10)
- Nathan East – bass (2)
- Abraham Laboriel – bass (3, 4, 6, 7, 9)
- Neil Stubenhaus – bass (5)
- Carlos Vega – drums (3, 4, 7)
- John Robinson – drums (5)
- Mike Baird – drums (9)
- Clyde Brooks – drums (10)
- Brandon Fields – alto saxophone (8)
- Bill Champlin – backing vocals (1, 7, 8, 10)
- Richard Page – backing vocals (2)
- El DeBarge – backing vocals (3)
- Tommy Funderburk – backing vocals (4)
- Thom Flora – backing vocals (6)
- Ann Marie Smith – backing vocals (6)
- Kin Vassy – backing vocals (6)
- Jason Scheff – backing vocals (7, 8)
- Tamara Champlin – backing vocals (8)
- Peter Beckett – backing vocals (9)

Music arrangements

- Jay Graydon – arrangements (1, 2, 4, 7, 8, 10)
- Randy Goodrum – arrangements (2)
- Steve Lukather – arrangements (2)
- Robbie Buchanan – arrangements (3)
- Kenny Mims – arrangements (10)

=== Production ===
- Jay Graydon – producer (1–4, 7–10), engineer
- David Malloy – producer (1, 6)
- Burt Bacharach – producer (5)
- Carole Bayer Sager – producer (5)
- Kenny Mims – producer (10), engineer
- Ian Eales – engineer
- Tom Singers – engineer
- Brian Malouf – mixing (6)
- Doug Sax – mastering at The Mastering Lab (Hollywood, California)
- Valerie Hobel – production assistant
- Gail Pearson – production assistant
- Marge Meoli – A&R coordinator
- John Coulter – design
- Bernie Boudreau – photography, photographic process development
- Michael Manoogian – lettering
- Bill Whitten – stylist
- Ken Kragen – management

== Charts ==
Chart performance for They Don't Make Them Like They Used To
Chart (1986–1987)	Peak position
Australian Albums (Kent Music Report)	60
Canadian RPM Top Albums	81
New Zealand Albums (RMNZ)	20
US Billboard 200	137
US Top Country Albums (Billboard)	16
