= Uncle Walt's Band =

Americana band

- Origin: Spartanburg, South Carolina
- Genres: Americana
- Years active: 1972–1983
- Labels: Lespedeza
- Past members: Walter Hyatt; Champ Hood; David Ball

Uncle Walt's Band was an Americana band founded in Spartanburg, South Carolina, by Walter Hyatt, Champ Hood, and David Ball. They were among the most popular acoustic bands in Austin, Texas, during the late 1970s and early 1980s, and were particularly noted for their intricate 3-part vocal harmonies as well as a sound that combined traditional country motifs with jazz, bluegrass, and Beatles-esque influences.

== History ==
Shortly after forming, Uncle Walt's Band moved from Spartanburg, South Carolina, to Nashville, Tennessee, in 1972, where they caught the attention of Texas singer-songwriter Willis Alan Ramsey, who would become the band's first noted fan. It was in 1972 that, with Ramsey's encouragement, the band first visited Texas where they would eventually reside.

The band returned to the Carolinas in 1974, recording Blame It on the Bossanova, their first record, at Charlotte, North Carolina's Arthur Smith Studios. It, and a similar release titled simply Uncle Walt's Band (released in 1978 with same songs in a re-shuffled order), were released on Hyatt's Lespedeza Records label.

In 1978, Uncle Walt's Band played a reunion gig in Austin, Texas, and the success that followed kept the band together in subsequent years. They played regularly in and around Austin until 1983, when they broke up after David Ball returned to Nashville to pursue his solo music career. During this period in Austin the band enjoyed considerable popularity and was a major influence on other artists including Lyle Lovett, Marcia Ball, Toni Price, Jimmie Dale Gilmore, and Lucinda Williams. During this time Uncle Walt's Band released two more albums on the Lespedeza label, An American in Texas (1980) and Uncle Walt's Band Recorded Live (1982), the latter of which was recorded at the Waterloo Ice House in Austin.

== Legacy ==
Hood and Hyatt both remained in Austin following Ball's departure. Hyatt moved to Nashville in the late 1980s but remained a frequent presence in the Austin music scene until his death on May 11, 1996, in the crash of ValuJet Flight 592. Hood lived and performed in Austin until his death from cancer on November 3, 2001.

Many Austin musicians continue to play songs written by members of Uncle Walt's Band. Hood's son Warren continues to reside in Austin and is a highly accomplished musician, including being a 7-time recipient of Best String Player at the Austin Music Awards. Much of his repertoire draws upon the music of Uncle Walt's Band. Warren's cousin Marshall Hood moved to Austin from Spartanburg as a cofounder of The Belleville Outfit, another young band strongly influenced by Uncle Walt's Band which was active from 2007-2011.

In 2007, during South by Southwest, the Austin Music Awards put together a tribute to Uncle Walt's Band, featuring Lyle Lovett and David Ball along with Warren and Marshall Hood. More recently, Warren and Marshall have reunited with Ball for a series of performances in tribute to Uncle Walt's Band under the name That Carolina Sound.

While Uncle Walt's Band's reputation and influence were strongest in the Southern U.S., particularly Austin and Spartanburg, the band also gained dedicated followings elsewhere including the University of California, Berkeley and Moscow University in Russia.

== Discography ==
=== Original Studio and Live Albums ===
- Blame It On The Bossanova (1974, LP, also issued as Uncle Walt's Band), Lespedeza Record Co.
  - (2010 reissue, CD) King Tears Music.
  - (2019 reissue, CD) Omnivore Records, contains 11 demos and live tracks not released elsewhere.
- An American in Texas (1980, LP) Lespedeza Record Co.
  - (2010 reissue, CD) King Tears Music.
  - (2019 reissue, CD) Omnivore Records, contains 8 tracks from of 6-26-79, and additional bonus live tracks and outtakes.
- Recorded Live (1982, LP, cassette) Lespedeza Record Co.
  - (2010 reissue, CD) King Tears Music.
  - (2019 reissue, CD) Omnivore Records, issued as Live at the Waterloo Ice House with some different takes, plus additional outtakes from same concerts.
- 6-26-79 (1983, Cassette) Lespedeza Record Co.
  - (2010 reissue, CD) King Tears Music. Contains original demo versions of "At Least Two Ways", "Far to Fall", and "You Keep Me Holding On", which were all re-recorded for An American in Texas.

=== Compilation albums ===
- The Girl On The Sunny Shore (1991, CD, LP, cassette) Sugar Hill Records. Compilation of original songs first issued on Blame It On The Bossanova and 6-26-79. Includes 2 outtakes from 1st album not released elsewhere.
- An American In Texas Revisited (1991, CD, LP, cassette) Sugar Hill Records. Compilation of original songs first issued on An American In Texas, 6-26-79, and Recorded Live.
- Anthology: Those Boys From Carolina, They Sure Enough Could Sing (2018, CD) Omnivore Recordings. Contains mostly tracks from original album releases, but also outtakes and live tracks unique to this release.
