= Yes I Do (album) =

Studio album by Anne Murray
- Released: August 27, 1991
- Studios: The Music Mill, Emerald Sound Studios, Sound Stage Studios and Sixteenth Avenue Sound (Nashville, Tennessee, USA); Manta Sound and Sounds Interchange, Ltd. (Toronto, Ontario, Canada)
- Genre: Country
- Length: 38:42
- Label: Capitol Nashville
- Producer: Jerry Crutchfield

Anne Murray chronology
You Will (1990)	Yes I Do (1991)	15 of the Best (1992)

Singles from Yes I Do
- 1. "I Can See Arkansas" Released: 1992

Yes I Do is the twenty-sixth studio album by Anne Murray, issued in 1991. The single "Everyday" from the album peaked at number 56 on the Billboard Hot Country Singles & Tracks chart.

== Track listing ==
1. "Overboard" (T. Graham Brown, Wayland Holyfield, Verlon Thompson) - 3:55
2. "I Can See Arkansas" (James Nihan, Wood Newton) - 4:10
3. "Even the Nights Are Better" (originally by Air Supply) (Ken Bell, J. L. Wallace, Terry Skinner) - 3:44
4. "You Sure Know How to Make a Memory" (Naomi Martin, Mike Reid) - 3:10
5. "Oh, Yes I Do" (Beth Nielsen Chapman, Kent Robbins) - 3:00
6. "Some Days It Rains All Night Long" (Ed Penney) - 2:56
7. "Roots and Wings" (Susan Longacre, Randy Sharp) - 3:40
8. "If I Ever See You Again" (Bill Rice, Sharon Rice) - 3:46
9. "Wrong End of the Rainbow" (Milton Blackford, Richard Leigh) - 3:14
10. "Everyday" (Spady Brannon, David Malloy) - 3:20
11. "Si Jamais Je Te Revois (If I Ever See You Again)" (Bill Rice, Sharon Rice, Gilles Goddard) - 3:47

== Personnel ==
- Anne Murray – vocals
- Phil Naish – keyboards
- Doug Riley – acoustic piano
- Mike Lawler – synthesizers
- Steve Gibson – guitars
- Billy Joe Walker Jr. – acoustic guitars
- Chris Leuzinger – dobro
- Paul Franklin – steel guitar
- Bob Wray – bass guitar
- Eddie Bayers – drums
- Tom Roady – percussion
- J.D. Martin – backing vocals
- Donna McElroy – backing vocals
- Lewis Nunley – backing vocals
- Wayland Patton – backing vocals
- Sharon Rice – backing vocals
- Debbie Schaal – backing vocals
- Lisa Silver – backing vocals

=== Production ===
- Jerry Crutchfield – producer
- Joe Scaife – recording engineer
- Ken Friesen – overdub engineer
- Paul Goldberg – overdub engineer, recording assistant
- John Guess – overdub engineer, remix engineer
- Dan Rudin – overdub engineer
- Graham Lewis – overdub assistant
- Dany Tremblay – overdub assistant
- Marty Williams – overdub assistant, assistant remix engineer
- Milan Bogdan – digital editing
- Glenn Meadows – mastering at Masterfonics (Nashville, Tennessee)
- Dennis Grant – photography
- Virginia Team – art direction
- Jerry Joyner – design
- George Abbott – make-up
- Sheila Yakimov – hair stylist
- Lee Kinoshita-Bevington – wardrobe
- Leonard T. Rambeau for Balmur Ltd. – management

== Chart performance ==
Chart (1992)	Peak position
Canadian RPM Country Albums	23
