= Riding with Private Malone =

"Riding With Private Malone"

Single by David Ball

from the album Amigo
- B-side: "Missing Her Blues"
- Released: August 13, 2001
- Recorded: May 9, 2001
- Genre: Neotraditional Country
- Length: 4:35 (album version); 4:20 (single version)
- Label: Dualtone
- Songwriters: Wood Newton; Thom Shepherd
- Producer: Wood Newton

David Ball singles chronology
| "I Want to with You" (1999) | "Riding With Private Malone" (2001) | "She Always Talked About Mexico" (2002) |

"Riding with Private Malone" is a song written by Wood Newton and Thom Shepherd, and recorded by American country music artist David Ball. It was released in August 2001 as the first single from his album Amigo. The song reached a peak of #2 on the Billboard Hot Country Singles & Tracks charts (now Hot Country Songs) chart, and #36 on the Billboard Hot 100. It was Ball's first Top 40 country hit since "Look What Followed Me Home" in 1995. USA Today referred to it as "the country song that tapped most subtly and profoundly into the emotions of its audience" after the September 11 attacks, even though it was released to radio a few weeks before the attacks.

== Background and writing ==
Co-writer Wood Newton stated in an interview that Thom Shepherd had the name of Malone, because it rhymed with home. Newton had seen a story about a man who had restored a 1966 Chevrolet Corvette and put up a website about it. He had also seen another story about a man who restored a car and he would tune the radio to one channel, but it would always change back to a different station, so he thought the car was haunted. Newton said they chose a 1966 Corvette because it was an amazing icon of American ingenuity. Newton and Shepherd debuted the song on March 23, 2001, during the Opry Star Spotlight overnight radio show on 650 WSM-AM/Nashville, hosted by WSM personality, Matthew Gillian.

== Content ==
The song describes a narrator who has just finished his military service and finds a classified ad for an "old Chevy". Upon purchasing the car, he discovers that it is actually a 1966 Corvette. He opens its glove compartment, where he finds a note written by the car's former owner, a deceased soldier of the Vietnam War. The note is dated 1966 and tells of the car's origins: it came from a soldier, Private Andrew Malone, and it stated: "If you're reading this, then I didn't make it home," implying that Malone wished for his car to be sold to another person should he die during the war.

Throughout the rest of the song, the narrator restores the car and begins driving it. On some occasions, he claims to have visions of a soldier sitting in the passenger seat (i.e., Private Malone's ghost) and the radio would tune itself to an oldies program, "especially late at night." By the third verse, the singer has wrecked the car after speeding on a curve in the road during a severe rainstorm. Although he does not recall any other details about the accident, he does state that a witness noticed him being rescued from the car by an unidentified soldier. The narrator is convinced that it was Private Malone himself who saved him. The narrator notes "I know I wouldn't be here if he hadn't tagged along" (i.e. his ghost sticking around) and "thank God I was riding with Private Malone."

== Critical reception ==
Rick Cohoon of Allmusic gave the song a favorable review. He stated that it "combines two elements that blend well for country fans-patriotism and the supernatural." Cohoon also said that "the plot is memorable, and Ball's performance drives the piece." Deborah Evans Price, of Billboard magazine reviewed the song favorably saying that the lyric "incorporates all the elements that make traditional country great - patriotism, tragedy, survival, and, of course, a cool car." She goes on to say that the understated production keeps the focus on the story and Ball's "powerful delivery."

== Parody ==
Cledus T. Judd made a parody version of the song called "Riding with Inmate Jerome" on his album A Six Pack of Judd, about purchasing a car belonging to an incarcerated pimp who later returns to take his car back when Judd is caught in the middle of a shootout.

== Chart positions ==
"Riding with Private Malone" debuted at number 55 on the U.S. Billboard Hot Country Singles & Tracks for the week of September 8, 2001. Having reached the top 10 by year's end, it was the second independently distributed single to make the country top 10 that year (the first being Mark McGuinn's "Mrs. Steven Rudy"), making 2001 the first year since 1983 to produce two independently distributed top 10 hits.

| Chart (2001) | Peak position |
|---|---|
| US Hot Country Songs (Billboard) | 2 |
| US Billboard Hot 100 | 36 |

=== Year-end charts ===
| Chart (2002) | Position |
|---|---|
| US Country Songs (Billboard) | 57 |
