= Sparkle City =

Sparkle City may refer to:

- Sparkle City, Ontario, a community of Augusta, Ontario
- Sparkle City (album), a 2010 album by David Ball
- "Sparkle City", a song by Shuggie Otis from his 1974 album, Inspiration Information
- Spartanburg, South Carolina
