= Starlite Lounge =

Studio album by David Ball
- Released: June 25, 1996
- Genre: Honky-tonk
- Length: 40:18
- Label: Warner Bros. Nashville
- Producer: Steve Buckingham; Ed Seay

David Ball chronology
Thinkin' Problem (1994)	Starlite Lounge (1996)	Play (1999)

Singles from Starlite Lounge
- 1. "Circle of Friends" Released: May 1996; 2. "Hangin' In and Hangin' On" Released: August 1996; 3. "I'll Never Make It Through This Fall" Released: February 1997

Professional ratings
Review scores
Source	Rating
Allmusic	4/5 stars

Starlite Lounge is the third studio album from American country music singer David Ball. It was his second album for Warner Bros. Records and was released in 1996. The album produced the singles "Circle of Friends" and "Hangin' In and Hangin' On", which respectively reached #49 and #67 on the Billboard country charts. The latter was previously recorded by McBride & the Ride (whose members also co-wrote it along with Gary Nicholson) on their 1994 album Hurry Sundown.

== Track listing ==
1. "Hangin' In and Hangin' On" (Terry McBride, Ray Herndon, Billy Thomas, Gary Nicholson) – 2:46
2. "Circle of Friends" (David Ball, Billy Spencer) – 2:48
3. "I've Got My Baby on My Mind" (Ball) – 3:07
4. "What Kind of Hold" (Ball, Tommy Polk) – 2:52
5. "I'll Never Make It Through This Fall" (Ball, Spencer) – 3:33
6. "Bad Day for the Blues" (Ball, Polk) – 2:33
7. "If You'd Like Some Lovin'" (Ball, Polk) – 3:12
8. "No More Lonely" (Ball, Polk) – 2:54
9. "I Never Did Know" (Ball, Dean Dillon) – 3:30
10. "The Bottle That Pours the Wine" (Ball, Allen Shamblin) – 4:22

== Personnel ==
As listed in linernotes.

- David Ball - acoustic guitar, lead vocals
- Eddie Bayers - drums
- Steve Buckingham - acoustic guitar, electric guitar
- Mark Casstevens - harmonica
- Paul Franklin - steel guitar, pedabro
- John Hobbs - piano
- Dann Huff - electric guitar
- Roy Huskey, Jr. - upright bass
- Alisa Jones - hammer dulcimer
- Liana Manis - background vocals
- Brent Mason - electric guitar
- Joey Miskulin - accordion
- Farrell Morris - vibraphone, percussion
- Louis Dean Nunley - background vocals
- Don Potter - acoustic guitar
- Michael Rhodes - bass guitar
- Brent Rowan - electric guitar
- John Wesley Ryles - background vocals
- Hank Singer - fiddle
- Joe Spivey – fiddle, mandolin
- Biff Watson - acoustic guitar
- Dennis Wilson - background vocals
- Curtis Young - background vocals
- Reggie Young - electric guitar

== Chart performance ==
Chart (1996)	Peak position
U.S. Billboard Top Country Albums	44
