= I Can See Arkansas =

Single by Anne Murray

from the album Yes I Do
- Released: 1992
- Genre: Country
- Length: 4:10
- Label: Liberty Records
- Songwriters: James Nihan; Wood Newton
- Producer: Jerry Crutchfield

Anne Murray singles chronology
| "If I Ever See You Again" (1991) | "I Can See Arkansas" (1992) | "Make Love to Me" (1993) |

"I Can See Arkansas" is a song recorded by Canadian country music artist Anne Murray. It was released in 1992 as the third single from her album Yes I Do. It peaked at number 9 on the RPM Country Tracks chart in July 1992.

The song was originally recorded by Steve Wariner on his 1990 album Laredo. It was also recorded by David Ball on his 2004 album Freewheeler. It was covered by Jamaican performer Ninjaman in 1992 and released under the title Mississippi.

== Chart performance ==
| Chart (1992) | Peak position |
|---|---|
| Canada Country Singles (RPM) | 9 |

=== Year-end charts ===
| Chart (1991) | Position |
|---|---|
| Canada Country Tracks (RPM) | 89 |
