= Bluebird (Anne Murray song) =

Single by Anne Murray

from the album You Will
- Released: November 1990
- Genre: Country
- Length: 3:34
- Label: Capitol Nashville
- Songwriter: Ron Irving
- Producer: Jerry Crutchfield

Anne Murray singles chronology
"Feed This Fire" (1990)	"Bluebird" (1990)	"New Way Out" (1991)

"Bluebird" is a song recorded by Canadian country pop singer Anne Murray for her 1990 album release You Will from which it was the second track sent for promotion to radio.

The song had first been recorded by its composer Ron Irving in 1980 as "Bluebird Lullaby", reaching number 28 on the RPM Country 50 Singles chart in March 1981: Irving, a native of Powell River (BC) then playing guitar and singing in lower mainland clubs, had written the song to be performed at his wedding. From 1985 Irving had fronted the group Bootleg whose 1988 self-titled album had included a remake of "Bluebird Lullaby": (quote Irving:) "My band had kind of run its course and was breaking up. Then I got the call that there was a song from our album that Anne [Murray] was going to record." On the strength of Murray's recording "Bluebird Lullaby" (as "Bluebird") Irving would be signed as a staff writer at BMG Publishing Group.

Murray would say of "Bluebird": "It had been twenty years since I did a bird song so I figured it was time for another" - referencing her 1970 breakout hit "Snowbird". Sung to a calypso arrangement, "Bluebird" would be the follow-up to Murray's Top Ten C&W hit "Feed This Fire", "Bluebird" would peak at number 39 on the Billboard C&W chart where Murray would subsequently have one final chart showing: "Everyday" (number 56, 1991). "Bluebird" was more of a success in Canada, rising as high as number 3 on the RPM100 Country Tracks chart in March 1991.

== Charts ==
Chart (1991)	Peak position
Canada Country Singles (RPM)	3
US Hot Country Songs (Billboard)	39

Year-end chart (1991)	Position
Canada Country Tracks (RPM)	15
