= I Got Dreams (song) =

Single by Steve Wariner

from the album I Got Dreams
- B-side: "The Loser Wins"
- Released: June 1989 (U.S.)
- Recorded: 1988
- Genre: Country
- Length: 3:52
- Label: MCA
- Songwriters: Bill LaBounty; Steve Wariner
- Producers: Jimmy Bowen; Steve Wariner

Steve Wariner singles chronology
"Where Did I Go Wrong" (1989)	"I Got Dreams" (1989)	"When I Could Come Home to You" (1989)

"I Got Dreams" is a song co-written and recorded by American country music artist Steve Wariner. It was released in June 1989 as the second single and title track from the album I Got Dreams. The song was the ninth and final number one on the country chart for Wariner as a solo artist. The single went to number one for one week and spent a total of fifteen weeks on the country chart. Wariner wrote the song with Bill LaBounty.

== Critical reception ==
In his book Country Music: A Biographical Dictionary, Richard Carlin wrote that the song was "jazzy" and said that its inclusion of scat singing made it a "novelty" for country music.

== Chart performance ==
Chart (1989)	Peak position
Canada Country Singles (RPM)	3
US Hot Country Songs (Billboard)	1

=== Year-end charts ===
Chart (1989)	Position
Canada Country Tracks (RPM)	26
US Country Songs (Billboard)	5
