= Hold On (A Little Longer) =

Single by Steve Wariner

from the album I Should Be with You
- B-side: "Runnin'"
- Released: October 15, 1988
- Genre: Country
- Length: 4:05
- Label: MCA
- Songwriter(s): Steve Wariner, Randy Hart
- Producer(s): Jimmy Bowen, Steve Wariner

Steve Wariner singles chronology
"I Should Be with You" (1988)	"Hold On (A Little Longer)" (1988)	"Where Did I Go Wrong" (1989)

"Hold On (A Little Longer)" is a song co-written and recorded by American country music artist Steve Wariner. It was released in October 1988 as the third single from the album I Should Be with You. The song reached #6 on the Billboard Hot Country Singles & Tracks chart. The song was written by Wariner and Randy Hart.

== Chart performance ==
Chart (1988–1989)	Peak position
US Hot Country Songs (Billboard)	6
Canadian RPM Country Tracks	4

=== Year-end charts ===
Chart (1989)	Position
Canada Country Tracks (RPM)	97
