= Where Did I Go Wrong =

Single by Steve Wariner

from the album I Got Dreams
- B-side: "Piano Texas Girl"
- Released: January 1989
- Genre: Country
- Length: 3:31
- Label: MCA
- Songwriter: Steve Wariner
- Producers: Jimmy Bowen; Steve Wariner

Steve Wariner singles chronology
"Hold On (A Little Longer)" (1988)	"Where Did I Go Wrong" (1989)	"I Got Dreams" (1989)

"Where Did I Go Wrong" is a song written and recorded by American country music artist Steve Wariner. It was released in January 1989 as the first single from the album I Got Dreams. It was Wariner's eighth number-one country single, spending one week at the top of the chart during a fourteen-week chart run.

== Chart performance ==
Chart (1989)	Peak position
Canada Country Singles (RPM)	1
US Hot Country Songs (Billboard)	1

=== Year-end charts ===
Chart (1989)	Position
Canada Country Tracks (RPM)	43
US Country Songs (Billboard)	17
