= The Domino Theory =

Single by Steve Wariner

from the album Laredo
- B-side: "I Wanna Go Back"
- Released: March 17, 1990
- Genre: Country
- Length: 3:38
- Label: MCA
- Songwriters: Bill LaBounty, Beckie Foster
- Producer: Randy Scruggs

Steve Wariner singles chronology
"When I Could Come Home to You" (1989)	"The Domino Theory" (1990)	"Precious Thing" (1990)

"The Domino Theory" is a song written by Bill LaBounty and Beckie Foster, and recorded by American country music artist Steve Wariner. It was released in March 1990 as the first single from the album Laredo. The song reached #7 on the Billboard Hot Country Singles & Tracks chart.

== Critical reception ==
A review of the song in Cash Box was favorable, stating that it "has that prefect [sic] radio tempo and is one of those songs you find yourself singing along with the first time you hear it."

== Chart performance ==
Chart (1990)	Peak position
Canada Country Singles (RPM)	3
US Hot Country Songs (Billboard)	7

=== Year-end charts ===
Chart (1990)	Position
Canada Country Tracks (RPM)	73
