= Leave Him Out of This =

1991 song performed by Steve Wariner

Single by Steve Wariner

from the album I Am Ready
- B-side: "Like a River to the Sea"
- Released: September 16, 1991
- Genre: Country
- Length: 3:57
- Label: Arista
- Songwriters: Walt Aldridge, Susan Longacre
- Producers: Scott Hendricks, Tim DuBois

Steve Wariner singles chronology
"There for Awhile" (1990)	"Leave Him Out of This" (1991)	"The Tips of My Fingers" (1992)

"Leave Him Out of This" is a song written by Walt Aldridge and Susan Longacre, and recorded by American country music artist Steve Wariner. It was released in September 1991 as the first single from the album I Am Ready. The song reached number 6 on the Billboard Hot Country Singles & Tracks chart.

== Chart performance ==
Chart (1991–1992)	Peak position
Canada Country Singles (RPM)	11
US Hot Country Songs (Billboard)	6
