= A Woman Loves =

Single by Steve Wariner

from the album I Am Ready
- B-side: "Everything's Gonna Be Alright"
- Released: May 30, 1992
- Genre: Country
- Length: 3:54
- Label: Arista
- Songwriters: Steve Bogard, Rick Giles
- Producers: Scott Hendricks, Tim DuBois

Steve Wariner singles chronology
"The Tips of My Fingers" (1992)	"A Woman Loves" (1992)	"Crash Course in the Blues" (1992)

"A Woman Loves" is a song written by Steve Bogard and Rick Giles, and recorded by American country music artist Steve Wariner. It was released in May 1992 as the third single from the album I Am Ready. The song reached #9 on the Billboard Hot Country Singles & Tracks chart.

== Chart performance ==
Chart (1992)	Peak position
Canada Country Singles (RPM)	12
US Hot Country Songs (Billboard)	9

=== Year-end charts ===
Chart (1992)	Position
US Country Songs (Billboard)	74
