= There for Awhile =

Single by Steve Wariner

from the album Laredo
- B-side: "Why Do the Heroes Die So Young"
- Released: November 10, 1990
- Genre: Country
- Length: 4:21
- Label: MCA
- Songwriters: Curtis Wright, Anna Lisa Graham
- Producer: Tony Brown

Steve Wariner singles chronology
"Precious Thing" (1990)	"There for Awhile" (1990)	"Leave Him Out of This" (1991)

"There for Awhile" is a song written by Curtis Wright and Anna Lisa Graham, and recorded by American country music artist Steve Wariner. It was released in November 1990 as the third single from the album Laredo. The song reached #17 on the Billboard Hot Country Singles & Tracks chart.

== Chart performance ==
Chart (1990–1991)	Peak position
Canada Country Singles (RPM)	16
US Hot Country Songs (Billboard)	17
