= Amigo (David Ball album) =

Studio album by David Ball
- Released: October 2, 2001
- Recorded: May 2001
- Genre: Country
- Length: 45:26
- Label: Dualtone
- Producer: Wood Newton

David Ball chronology
Play (1999)	Amigo (2001)	Freewheeler (2004)

Singles from Thinkin' Problem
- 1. "Riding with Private Malone" Released: August 13, 2001; 2. "She Always Talked About Mexico" Released: 2002

Professional ratings
Review scores
Source	Rating
AllMusic	4.5/5 stars

Amigo is the fifth studio album by American country music singer David Ball. It was released in 2001 on the Dualtone Records label. The album produced a hit single in "Riding with Private Malone", which reached number 2 on the Billboard country charts and #36 on the Billboard Hot 100, becoming his first Top 40 hit since "Look What Followed Me Home" in 1995. Despite the success of the lead-off single, however, neither of the two follow-ups — "She Always Talked About Mexico" and "Whenever You Come Back to Me" — charted. The track "Texas Echo" is a re-recording of a song which Ball originally recorded on his 1989 self-titled debut.

== Track listing ==
No.	Title	Writer(s)	Length
1.	"Amigo"	David Ball, Kostas	3:12
2.	"Missing Her Blues"	Ball, Luke Reed	3:46
3.	"She Always Talked About Mexico"	Ball, Wood Newton	3:40
4.	"Riding with Private Malone"	Newton, Thom Shepherd	4:35
5.	"Whenever You Come Back to Me"	Ball, Allen Shamblin	3:38
6.	"Loser Friendly"	Paul Craft, Michael McGrew, Newton	3:41
7.	"Linger Awhile"	Harry Owens, Vincent Rose	3:19
8.	"Trying Not to Love You"	Merle Haggard	3:42
9.	"New Shiner Polka"	Ball	2:47
10.	"Texas Echo"	Ball	3:16
11.	"Swing Baby"	Ball, Newton	2:16
12.	"Just Out of Reach"	Virgil F. Stewart	3:46
13.	"When the Devil Wants to Wrestle"	Ball	3:48
Total length:			45:26

== Personnel ==
As listed in liner notes.

- Audrey Ball - background vocals
- David Ball - lead vocals, background vocals, acoustic guitar
- Vince Barranco - drums, percussion
- Chris Carmichael - fiddle
- Dan Frizsell - bass guitar
- Stephen Hill - background vocals
- Randy Khors - background vocals
- Steve Larios - steel guitar, Chromatic harmonica
- Scott Miller - trumpet
- Kim Morrison - background vocals
- Wood Newton - background vocals
- Billy Panda - acoustic guitar, electric guitar
- Kenny Sears - fiddle
- Joe Spivey - fiddle
- Jeff Taylor - piano, accordion

== Charts ==
=== Weekly charts ===
Chart (2001)	Peak position
US Billboard 200	120
US Top Country Albums (Billboard)	11

=== Year-end charts ===
Chart (2002)	Position
US Top Country Albums (Billboard)	37
