= When the Thought of You Catches Up with Me =

Single by David Ball

from the album Thinkin' Problem
- B-side: "Don't Think Twice"
- Released: August 29, 1994
- Genre: Country
- Length: 3:01 (album version)
- Label: Warner Bros. Nashville
- Songwriter: David Ball
- Producer: Blake Chancey

David Ball singles chronology
"Thinkin' Problem" (1994)	"When the Thought of You Catches Up with Me" (1994)	"Look What Followed Me Home" (1995)

"When the Thought of You Catches Up with Me" is a song written and recorded by American country music singer David Ball. It was released in August 1994 as the second single from the album Thinkin' Problem as the follow-up to the successful title track. This song reached number 7 on the Hot Country Singles & Tracks (now Hot Country Songs) chart, and number 6 on Canada's RPM country chart.

== Content ==
In the song, Ball describes instances when the memory of a lost love resurfaces, whether it be a beautiful day or in the dead of night.

== Music video ==
The music video was directed by Chris Rogers.

== Chart positions ==
"When the Thought of You Catches Up with Me" debuted on the U.S. Billboard Hot Country Singles & Tracks for the week of September 10, 1994.

Chart (1994)	Peak position
Canada Country Singles (RPM)	6
US Bubbling Under Hot 100 (Billboard)	7
US Hot Country Songs (Billboard)	7
