= Baby I'm Yours (Steve Wariner song) =

Single by Steve Wariner

from the album I Should Be with You
- B-side: "All That Matters"
- Released: February 20, 1988
- Genre: Country
- Length: 3:41
- Label: MCA
- Songwriter(s): Steve Wariner, Guy Clark
- Producer(s): Jimmy Bowen, Steve Wariner

Steve Wariner singles chronology
"Lynda" (1987)	"Baby I'm Yours" (1988)	"I Should Be with You" (1988)

"Baby I'm Yours" is a song co-written and recorded by American country music artist Steve Wariner. It was released in February 1988 as the first single from the album I Should Be with You. The song reached #2 on the Billboard Hot Country Singles chart. The song was written by Wariner and Guy Clark.

== Charts ==
=== Weekly charts ===
Chart (1988)	Peak position
US Hot Country Songs (Billboard)	2
Canadian RPM Country Tracks	1

=== Year-end charts ===
Chart (1988)	Position
US Hot Country Songs (Billboard)	44
