= I Got Dreams =

Studio album by Steve Wariner
- Released: March 6, 1989
- Recorded: 1988
- Studio: Eleven Eleven Sound, Masterfonics, and Sound Stage Studios (Nashville, Tennessee)
- Genre: Country
- Length: 34:42
- Label: MCA Records
- Producer: Jimmy Bowen and Steve Wariner

Steve Wariner chronology
I Should Be with You (1988)	I Got Dreams (1989)	Laredo (1990)

Singles from I Got Dreams
- 1. "Where Did I Go Wrong" Released: January 1989; 2. "I Got Dreams" Released: June 1989; 3. "When I Could Come Home to You" Released: October 21, 1989

Professional ratings
Review scores
Source	Rating
Allmusic	2.5/5 stars

I Got Dreams is the seventh studio album by American country music artist Steve Wariner. It was released in 1989 by MCA Records. The album includes "Where Did I Go Wrong", "I Got Dreams" and "When I Could Come Home to You". "Where Did I Go Wrong" and "I Got Dreams" were both Number One country hits for him, and "When I Could Come Home to You" peaked at #5.

== Track listing ==
No.	Title	Writer(s)	Length
1.	"I Got Dreams"	Steve Wariner, Bill LaBounty	3:51
2.	"Where Did I Go Wrong"	S. Wariner	3:31
3.	"I Could Get Lucky Tonight"	S. Wariner, LaBounty, Beckie Foster, Jennifer Kimball	3:57
4.	"Nothin' in the World (Gonna Keep Me from You)"	S. Wariner, Mike Reid	3:35
5.	"When I Could Come Home to You"	S. Wariner, Roger Murrah	3:45
6.	"Language of Love"	S. Wariner, John Hall, Johanna Hall	3:15
7.	"The Loser Wins"	S. Wariner, Mac McAnally	3:26
8.	"Do You Wanna Make Something of It"	S. Wariner, Wood Newton	3:07
9.	"Plano Texas Girl"	S. Wariner, Terry Wariner	2:55
10.	"The Flower That Shattered the Stone"	John Barlow Jarvis, Joe Henry	3:20

== Personnel ==
As listed in liner notes.

- Steve Wariner – lead vocals, backing vocals, acoustic guitar, electric guitars
- John Barlow Jarvis – keyboards, acoustic piano solo (10)
- Mac McAnally – acoustic guitar, percussion, backing vocals
- Billy Joe Walker Jr. – acoustic guitar, electric guitars
- Allyn Love – steel guitar
- Carl Jackson – mandolin
- David Hungate – bass guitar
- Rick Marotta – drums
- Farrell Morris – percussion
- Rick Stephenson - glockenspiel
- Mark O'Connor – fiddle
- George Grantham – backing vocals
- Bill LaBounty – backing vocals
- Terry Wariner – backing vocals

=== Production ===
- Jimmy Bowen – producer
- Steve Wariner – producer
- Tim Kish – recording, overdub recording
- Ron Treat – recording
- John Guess – mixing
- Bob Bullock – mixing, overdub recording
- Mark Coddington – overdub recording, second engineer
- Willie Pevear – overdub recording
- Rodney Good – second engineer
- Sheila Mann – second engineer
- Russ Martin – second engineer
- Marty Williams – second engineer
- Milan Bogdan – digital editing
- Glenn Meadows – mastering
- Masterfonics (Nashville, Tennessee) – editing and mastering location
- Don Lanier – pre-production
- Jessie Noble – project coordinator
- Simon Levy – art direction
- David Wariner – design
- Jim "Señior" McGuire – photography
- Sherri McCoy – wardrobe, make-up
- Ann Rice – wardrobe, make-up
- Vector Management – management

== Charts ==
=== Weekly charts ===
Chart (1989)	Peak position
US Top Country Albums (Billboard)	32

=== Year-end charts ===
Chart (1989)	Position
US Top Country Albums (Billboard)	62
