= Heartaches by the Number (David Ball album) =

Studio album by David Ball
- Released: March 27, 2007
- Genre: Country
- Label: Shanachie
- Producer: Daniel Frizsell

David Ball chronology
Freewheeler (2004)	Heartaches by the Number (2007)	Sparkle City (2010)

Professional ratings
Review scores
Source	Rating
AllMusic	3.5/5 stars

Heartaches by the Number is an album released in 2007 by American country music artist David Ball. It is his first release for the Shanachie Records label. Except for the track "Please Feed the Jukebox", which Ball wrote himself, all of the songs on this album are covers of classic country songs. No singles were released from this album.

== Track listing ==
Track	Song title	Writer(s)	Original artist	Length
1	"Pick Me Up on Your Way Down"	Harlan Howard	Charlie Walker	2:47
2	"Stop the World and Let Me Off"	Carl Belew, W.S. Stevenson	Patsy Cline	2:31
3	"Heartaches by the Number"	Howard	Ray Price	3:01
4	"Sweet Dreams"	Don Gibson	Don Gibson	3:11
5	"Please Feed the Jukebox"	David Ball	David Ball	2:46
6	"There Stands the Glass"	Russ Hull, Audrey Grisham, Mary Jean Shurtz	Webb Pierce	2:18
7	"Faded Love"	Bob Wills, Johnny Wills	Bob Wills	3:32
8	"What's Going On in Your World"	David Chamberlain, Royce Porter, Red Steagall	George Strait	3:36
9	"Half as Much"	Curley Williams	Hank Williams	2:11
10	"Please Help Me, I'm Falling"	Don Robertson, Hal Blair	Hank Locklin	2:22
11	"I'm Walking the Dog"	Clifton Grimsley, E.M. Grimsley	Webb Pierce	2:28

== Personnel ==
- David Ball - lead vocals
- Brad Clancey - drums
- Perry Coleman - background vocals
- Steve Gibson - electric guitar
- Owen Hale - drums
- Mike Johnson - steel guitar
- Chris Leuzinger - electric guitar
- Larry Paxton - bass guitar
- Joe Spivey - fiddle, acoustic guitar
- Tommy White - steel guitar
