= Thinkin' Problem (song) =

Single by David Ball

from the album Thinkin' Problem
- B-side: "Down at the Bottom of a Broken Heart"
- Released: March 28, 1994
- Recorded: January 1994
- Genre: Country; honky-tonk
- Length: 3:00
- Label: Warner Bros. Nashville
- Songwriters: David Ball; Allen Shamblin; Stuart Ziff
- Producer: Blake Chancey

David Ball singles chronology
"Gift of Love" (1989)	"Thinkin' Problem" (1994)	"When the Thought of You Catches Up with Me" (1994)

"Thinkin' Problem" is a song co-written and recorded by American country music singer David Ball. Ball co-wrote the song with Allen Shamblin and Stuart Ziff. It was released in March 1994 as the lead-off single and title track from his album Thinkin' Problem. The song reached number 2 on the Hot Country Singles & Tracks (now Hot Country Songs) chart, and number 1 on Canada's RPM country chart. It also earned Ball a nomination for the Grammy Award for Best Male Country Vocal Performance at the 37th Annual Grammy Awards in 1995, as well as a nomination for the Country Music Association Award for Song of the Year.

== Content ==
"Thinkin' Problem" is a moderate up-tempo with electric guitar, pedal steel guitar, and fiddle flourishes. In it, the male narrator states that he has a "thinkin' problem" (meant as a play on the term "drinking problem") because he is constantly thinking about his former significant other despite numerous attempts to quit. The song begins with the famous phrase "Yes I admit, I've got a thinkin' problem", with the final syllable of the word "admit" drawn out.

== Music video ==
The music video was directed by O Pictures and premiered in early 1994.

== Critical reception ==
Rick Cohoon of Allmusic gave the song a mixed review, saying that it "is the fuel that ignited Ball's launch into stardom" but that "he tends to over-nasalize to the point of annoyance." Deborah Evans Price, of Billboard magazine reviewed the song favorably calling it a "perfect combination of retro sensibility and '90s production, and a pure honky-tonk delight."

== Parody ==
Cledus T. Judd, a country music parodist, parodied the song as "Stinkin' Problem" on his 1995 debut album Cledus T. Judd (No Relation).

== Chart positions ==
"Thinkin' Problem" debuted at number 72 on the U.S. Billboard Hot Country Singles & Tracks for the week of April 16, 1994.

Chart (1994)	Peak position
Canada Country Singles (RPM)	1
US Billboard Hot 100	40
US Hot Country Songs (Billboard)	2

=== Year-end charts ===
Chart (1994)	Position
Canada Country Tracks (RPM)	18
US Country Songs (Billboard)	71
