= You Will (album) =

Studio album by Anne Murray
- Released: August 13, 1990
- Studios: The Music Mill, Digital Recorders, Sound Stage Studios, Scruggs Sound Studio, Treasure Isle Recorders and Masterfonics (Nashville, Tennessee, USA); Manta Sound (Toronto, Ontario, Canada)
- Genre: Country
- Length: 34:19
- Label: Capitol Nashville
- Producer: Jerry Crutchfield

Anne Murray chronology
Greatest Hits Volume II (1989)	You Will (1990)	Yes I Do (1991)

Singles from You Will
- 1. "Feed This Fire" Released: August 25, 1990; 2. "Bluebird" Released: November 1990

You Will is the twenty-fifth studio album by Canadian country pop artist Anne Murray, released in 1990 via Capitol Records. The album peaked at number 47 on the Billboard Top Country Albums chart.

The album includes the Top 10 hits "Bluebird" and "Feed This Fire". The title track was later a Top 10 hit for Patty Loveless.

== Track listing ==
No.	Title	Writer(s)	Length
1.	"Hold Me (Just a Little Longer Tonight)"	Graham Lyle, Troy Seals	3:34
2.	"New Way Out"	Randy Sharp	3:19
3.	"Bluebird"	Ron Irving	3:32
4.	"Wrong End of the Rainbow"	Milton Blackford, Richard Leigh	3:14
5.	"Mean Old Moon"	Bob Regan	3:09
6.	"You Will"	Mary Ann Kennedy, Pam Rose, Sharp	3:11
7.	"The Final Say"	Sharp, Jeff Silbar	4:00
8.	"Feed This Fire"	Hugh Prestwood	2:59
9.	"A Little Short of Love"	Kye Fleming, Kennedy	3:30
10.	"A New Moon, An Old Flame and You"	Roger Brown, Howard Emerson, Bob Morrison	3:50

== Personnel ==
- Anne Murray – vocals
- Clayton Ivey – acoustic piano, synthesizers, Hammond B3 organ
- Doug Riley – acoustic piano
- Mitch Humphries – synthesizers
- Mike Lawler – synthesizers
- Billy Joe Walker Jr. – acoustic guitars
- Larry Byrom – electric guitars
- Reggie Young – electric guitars
- Mark O'Connor – mandolin
- Michael Rhodes – bass
- Eddie Bayers – drums
- Terry McMillan – harmonica, congas, wind chimes
- Rob Hajacos – fiddle
- Bergen White – string arrangements
- The "A" Strings – strings
- Bruce Murray – backing vocals
- Debbie Schall – backing vocals
- Hurshall Wiggington – backing vocals
- Curtis Young – backing vocals
- Llana Young – backing vocals

=== Production ===
- Jerry Crutchfield – producer
- Jim Cotton – digital recording
- Ken Friesen – overdub recording
- David Boyer – digital recording assistant, overdub assistant
- Paul Goldberg – digital recording assistant
- Scott Hendricks – additional overdub recording
- Tom Perry – additional overdub recording
- Ron Reynolds – additional overdub recording
- Billy Sherrill – additional overdub recording
- Michael Colomby – overdub assistant
- Patrick Hutchinson – overdub assistant
- Paula Montondo – overdub assistant
- John Guess – remixing
- Russ Martin – assistant remix engineer
- Milan Bogdan – digital editing
- Glenn Meadows – mastering
- Marty Craighead – production coordinator
- Virginia Team – art direction
- Micky Braithwaite – design
- Denise Grant – photography
- Sheila Yakimov – hair stylist
- George Abbott – make-up artist
- Leonard T. Rambeau for Balmur Ltd. – management

== Chart performance ==
Chart (1990)	Peak position
U.S. Billboard Top Country Albums	47
