= When I Could Come Home to You =

Single by Steve Wariner

from the album I Got Dreams
- B-side: "Want to Make Something of It"
- Released: October 21, 1989
- Genre: Country
- Length: 3:48
- Label: MCA
- Songwriters: Steve Wariner, Roger Murrah
- Producers: Jimmy Bowen, Steve Wariner

Steve Wariner singles chronology
"I Got Dreams" (1989)	"When I Could Come Home to You" (1989)	"The Domino Theory" (1990)

"When I Could Come Home to You" is a song co-written and recorded by American country music artist Steve Wariner. It was released in October 1989 as the third single from the album I Got Dreams. The song reached #5 on the Billboard Hot Country Singles chart. Wariner wrote the song with Roger Murrah.

== Chart performance ==
Chart (1989–1990)	Peak position
Canada Country Singles (RPM)	10
US Hot Country Songs (Billboard)	5

=== Year-end charts ===
Chart (1990)	Position
US Country Songs (Billboard)	29
