= Twenty Years Ago =

1987 single by Kenny Rogers

Single by Kenny Rogers

from the album They Don't Make Them Like They Used To
- B-side: "The Heart of the Matter"
- Released: January 5, 1987
- Genre: Country
- Length: 3:44
- Label: RCA
- Songwriters: Dan Tyler; Wood Newton; Michael Noble; C. Michael Spriggs
- Producers: Jay Graydon, Kenny Mims

Kenny Rogers singles chronology
"They Don't Make Them Like They Used To" (1986)	"Twenty Years Ago" (1987)	"Make No Mistake, She's Mine" (1987)

"Twenty Years Ago" is a song written by Dan Tyler, Wood Newton, Michael Noble and C. Michael Spriggs. It was recorded by Juice Newton for her 1983 album Dirty Looks. In 1986, the song was covered by Kenny Rogers and released in January 1987 as the second single from his album They Don't Make Them Like They Used To. Backup vocals were provided by Bill Champlin. It reached number two on the Billboard Hot Country Singles chart and #15 on the Adult Contemporary Chart.

== Content ==
In the song, the narrator talks about visiting the old town in which he grew up, and mentions how much simpler and possibly better life was back then. He mentions the old movie house and the drug store where he worked, and his childhood friend who died in Vietnam. The music video was shot in Clarksville, Tennessee largely on Franklin Street.

== Charts ==
=== Weekly charts ===
Chart (1987)	Peak position
US Hot Country Songs (Billboard)	2
Canadian RPM Country Tracks	2

=== Year-end charts ===
Chart (1987)	Position
US Hot Country Songs (Billboard)	33
