= The Tip of My Fingers =

1960 single by Bill Anderson

Single by Bill Anderson

from the album Bill Anderson Sings Country Heart Songs
- B-side: "No Man's Land"
- Released: June 20, 1960
- Recorded: March 3, 1960
- Studio: Bradley Studios (Nashville, Tennessee)
- Genre: Country
- Length: 2:55
- Label: Decca #31092
- Songwriter: Bill Anderson
- Producer: Owen Bradley

Bill Anderson singles chronology
"Dead or Alive" (1959)	"The Tip of My Fingers" (1960)	"Walk Out Backwards" (1960)

"The Tip of My Fingers", also titled "The Tips of My Fingers", is a song written and originally recorded by American country music singer Bill Anderson. First included on his 1962 album Bill Anderson Sings Country Heart Songs, the song was a Top Ten country single for him in 1960.

== Chart performance ==
Chart (1960)	Peak position
US Hot Country Songs (Billboard)	7

== Roy Clark version ==
"The Tips of My Fingers"

Single by Roy Clark

from the album Roy Clark Sings The Tip of My Fingers
- B-side: "Spooky Movies"
- Released: 1963
- Recorded: 1963
- Genre: Country
- Length: 2:40
- Label: Capitol #4956
- Songwriter: Bill Anderson
- Producer: Ken Nelson

Roy Clark singles chronology
"Talk About a Party" (1962)	"The Tips of My Fingers" (1963)	"Application for Love" (1963)

In 1963, Roy Clark released a version from his album Roy Clark Sings The Tip of My Fingers, titled "The Tips of My Fingers". It was his first chart single, reaching number 10 on the country charts and number 45 on the pop charts.

=== Chart performance ===
Chart (1963)	Peak position
US Hot Country Songs (Billboard)	10
US Billboard Hot 100	45
Canada (CHUM Chart	29

== Eddy Arnold version ==
"The Tip of My Fingers"

Single by Eddy Arnold

from the album Somebody Like Me
- B-side: "Long, Long Friendship"
- Released: July 23, 1966
- Recorded: April 19, 1966
- Genre: Country
- Length: 3:00
- Label: RCA Victor #8869
- Songwriter: Bill Anderson
- Producer: Chet Atkins

Eddy Arnold singles chronology
"The Last Word in Lonesome Is Me" (1966)	"The Tip of My Fingers" (1966)	"Somebody Like Me" (1966)

Eddy Arnold recorded the song in 1966 on his album Somebody Like Me. It was the first single from that album, reaching number 3 on the country charts.

=== Chart performance ===
Chart (1966)	Peak position
US Hot Country Songs (Billboard)	3
US Billboard Hot 100	43
US Adult Contemporary (Billboard)	8
Canadian RPM Top Singles	57

== Jean Shepard version ==
"The Tip of My Fingers"

Single by Jean Shepard

from the album Poor Sweet Baby...And Ten More Bill Anderson Songs
- B-side: "Bright Lights and Country Music"
- Released: February 22, 1975
- Genre: Country
- Length: ?
- Label: United Artists #591
- Songwriter: Bill Anderson
- Producer: Larry Butler

Jean Shepard singles chronology
"Poor Sweet Baby" (1975)	"The Tip of My Fingers" (1975)	"I'm a Believer (In a Whole Lot of Lovin')" (1975)

In 1975, Jean Shepard released a rendition of the song as well. Her version was included on Poor Sweet Baby (And Ten Other Bill Anderson Songs), an album comprising cover versions of Anderson's work.

=== Chart performance ===
Chart (1975)	Peak position
US Hot Country Songs (Billboard)	16
Canadian RPM Country Playlist	25

== Anita Perras version ==
"The Tip of My Fingers"

Single by Anita Perras

from the album Touch My Heart
- Released: 1989
- Genre: Country
- Length: 2:48
- Label: Savannah #9834
- Songwriter: Bill Anderson
- Producer: Mike Francis

Anita Perras singles chronology
"Hello Again" (1989)	"The Tip of My Fingers" (1989)	"Touch My Heart" (1989)

Canadian country music singer Anita Perras covered the song on her 1989 album Touch My Heart. Her version was released as a single and peaked at number 9 on the RPM Country Tracks chart.

=== Chart performance ===
Chart (1989)	Peak position
Canada Country Singles (RPM)	9

=== Year-end charts ===
Chart (1989)	Position
Canada Country Tracks (RPM)	45

== Steve Wariner version ==
"The Tips of My Fingers"

Single by Steve Wariner

from the album I Am Ready
- B-side: "When Will I Let Go"
- Released: February 8, 1992
- Genre: Country
- Length: 3:39
- Label: Arista Nashville #12393
- Songwriter: Bill Anderson
- Producers: Scott Hendricks; Tim DuBois

Steve Wariner singles chronology
"Leave Him Out of This" (1991)	"The Tips of My Fingers" (1992)	"A Woman Loves" (1992)

The most recently charted cover version was by Steve Wariner, on his 1991 album I Am Ready. It was his twenty-fourth Top Ten country hit, also peaking at number 3. Wariner's rendition was also titled "The Tips of My Fingers". Wariner's version features backing vocals from Vince Gill.

=== Chart performance ===
Chart (1992)	Peak position
Canada Country Singles (RPM)	19
US Hot Country Songs (Billboard)	3

=== Year-end charts ===
Chart (1992)	Position
US Country Songs (Billboard)	54

== Other recorded versions ==
- Nick Noble recorded a version of the song which was released on Coral 9-62213 in 1960. It debuted on the Cash Box Top 100 Singles chart on the week ending August 6, 1960. It peaked at no. 85 on the week ending August 20, and held that position for another week.
- It was recorded by UK singer Karl Denver in 1966, however it did not chart.
- Dean Martin recorded the song in 1970 for his album My Woman My Woman My Wife
- Barbara Fairchild recorded it on her album Barbara Fairchild live in concert
- UK singer Des O'Connor recorded it in 1970 where it reached number 15 in the UK singles chart.
