= I Should Be with You =

Studio album by Steve Wariner
- Released: March 7, 1988
- Recorded: 1987
- Studio: Sound Stage Studios (Nashville, Tennessee)
- Genre: Country
- Length: 35:42
- Label: MCA Records
- Producer: Jimmy Bowen; Steve Wariner

Steve Wariner chronology
Greatest Hits (1987)	I Should Be with You (1988)	I Got Dreams (1989)

Singles from I Should Be with You
- 1. "Baby I'm Yours" Released: February 20, 1988; 2. "I Should Be with You" Released: June 18, 1988; 3. "Hold On (A Little Longer)" Released: October 15, 1988

Professional ratings
Review scores
Source	Rating
Allmusic	3/5 stars
Philadelphia Inquirer	3/4 stars

I Should Be with You is the sixth studio album by American country music artist Steve Wariner. It was released on March 7, 1988, by MCA Records. It includes the singles "Baby I'm Yours", "I Should Be With You" and "Hold On (A Little Longer)", which reached #2, #2, and #6, respectively, on the Billboard country charts. The album peaked at #20 on Top Country Albums. "More Than Enough" was recorded the same year by Glen Campbell on Light Years, also produced by Jimmy Bowen for MCA.

== Track listing ==
No.	Title	Writer(s)	Length
1.	"Runnin'"	Wendy Waldman, Steve Wariner	4:03
2.	"More Than Enough"	Jimmy Webb	2:55
3.	"Hold On (A Little Longer)"	Randy Hart, Wariner	4:03
4.	"Caught Between Your Duty and Your Dream"	Don Schlitz, Wariner	4:17
5.	"I Should Be with You"	Wariner	3:28
6.	"All That Matters"	Martin Fry, Wariner, Mark White	3:17
7.	"Party of One"	Mac McAnally	3:30
8.	"Baby I'm Yours"	Guy Clark, Wariner	3:38
9.	"Somewhere Between Old and New York"	Randy Goodrum, Dave Loggins	3:41
10.	"Lights Out"	Loggins, Schlitz	3:26

== Personnel ==
- Steve Wariner – vocals, backing vocals (1), acoustic guitar (1, 2, 4, 5, 7), electric guitar solo (1, 6–9), acoustic guitar solo (3), electric guitars (6, 8–10)
- Bill Payne – Yamaha DX7 (1, 2, 5), keyboards (3, 7, 9), acoustic piano (6, 8, 10)
- Billy Joe Walker Jr. – electric guitars (1, 2, 5, 9, 10), acoustic guitar (3, 4, 6–8), hi-string guitar (4)
- Reggie Young – electric guitars
- Allyn Love – steel guitar (3), dobro (4)
- Mark O'Connor – fiddle (2–4), mandolin (2)
- Leland Sklar – bass
- Russ Kunkel – drums
- Mac McAnally – backing vocals (1, 10), keyboards (7)
- Wendy Waldman – backing vocals (1, 10)
- Glen Campbell – backing vocals (2)
- George Grantham – backing vocals (3, 6)
- Terry Wariner – backing vocals (3, 4, 6)

=== Production ===
- Jimmy Bowen – producer
- Steve Wariner – producer
- John Guess – mixing
- Ron Treat – recording, overdub recording
- Bob Bullock – overdub recording, mixing
- Russ Martin – overdub recording
- Willie Pevear – overdub recording
- Mark Coddington – overdub recording, second engineer
- Tim Kish – overdub recording, second engineer
- Marty Williams – second engineer
- Milan Bogdan – digital editing
- Glenn Meadows – mastering at Masterfonics (Nashville, Tennessee)
- Jessie Noble – project coordinator
- Simon Levy – art direction
- Mickey Braithwaite – design
- Caroline Greyshock – photography

== Chart performance ==
Chart (1988)	Peak position
U.S. Billboard Top Country Albums	20
