= Thinkin' Problem =

Studio album by David Ball
- Released: June 14, 1994
- Recorded: Late 1993 & Early 1994
- Genre: Neotraditional country
- Length: 31:49
- Label: Warner Bros. Nashville
- Producer: Blake Chancey

David Ball chronology
David Ball (1989)	Thinkin' Problem (1994)	Starlite Lounge (1996)

Singles from Thinkin' Problem
- 1. "Thinkin' Problem" Released: March 28, 1994; 2. "When the Thought of You Catches Up with Me" Released: August 29, 1994; 3. "Look What Followed Me Home" Released: January 14, 1995; 4. "What Do You Want with His Love" Released: May 1995; 5. "Honky Tonk Healin'" Released: August 1995

Professional ratings
Review scores
Source	Rating
Allmusic	4.5/5 stars

Thinkin' Problem is the second studio album by American country music artist David Ball. It was released in 1994 (see 1994 in country music) on Warner Bros. Records Nashville. Although he had recorded an eponymous album for RCA Nashville in 1988 prior to the release of Thinkin' Problem, the RCA album was not released until later in 1994.

Thinkin' Problem was certified platinum by the RIAA for sales of one million copies in the United States. It produced five singles for him on the Billboard Hot Country Singles & Tracks (now Hot Country Songs) charts between 1994 and 1995. The first of these to chart was the title track, which reached number 2 on the country charts and number 40 on the Billboard Hot 100. Following it were "When the Thought of You Catches Up with Me" (number 7 on the country charts), "Look What Followed Me Home" (number 11), "What Do You Want with His Love" (number 48), and finally, "Honky Tonk Healin'" at number 50.

"Blowin' Smoke" was also recorded by country singer, guitarist and songwriter Dennis Robbins for his 1994 album Born Ready.

== Track listing ==
No.	Title	Writer(s)	Length
1.	"Thinkin' Problem"	David Ball, Allen Shamblin, Stuart Ziff	3:00
2.	"Look What Followed Me Home"	Ball, Tommy Polk	2:58
3.	"Blowin' Smoke"	Ball, Polk, Billy Spencer	2:57
4.	"When the Thought of You Catches Up with Me"	Ball	3:00
5.	"Honky Tonk Healin'"	Ball, Polk	3:22
6.	"A Walk on the Wild Side of Life"	Wayne Walker	3:07
7.	"Down at the Bottom of a Broken Heart"	Ball	3:04
8.	"What Do You Want with His Love"	Ball, Larry Jeffries	3:40
9.	"Don't Think Twice"	Ball	3:04
10.	"12-12-84"	Ball, Polk, Spencer	3:37

== Personnel ==
- David Ball – lead vocals, background vocals, acoustic guitar
- Glen Duncan – fiddle
- Sonny Garrish – steel guitar
- Rob Hajacos – fiddle
- Owen Hale – drums
- Larry Marrs – background vocals
- Brent Mason – acoustic guitar, electric guitar
- Steve Nathan – piano
- Suzi Ragsdale – background vocals
- Hank Singer – fiddle
- Stephony Smith – background vocals
- Blaine Sprouce – fiddle
- Tommy Spurlock – steel guitar
- Harry Stinson – background vocals
- Verlon Thompson – acoustic guitar
- Cindy Richardson Walker – background vocals
- Glenn Worf – bass guitar
- Stuart Ziff – acoustic guitar, electric guitar

== Charts ==
=== Weekly charts ===
Chart (1994)	Peak position
Canadian Albums (RPM)	55
Canadian Country Albums (RPM)	3
US Billboard 200	53
US Top Country Albums (Billboard)	6

=== Year-end charts ===
Chart (1994)	Position
US Top Country Albums (Billboard)	42
Chart (1995)	Position
US Billboard 200	169
US Top Country Albums (Billboard)	25
