= I Am Ready =

1991 studio album by Steve Wariner

Studio album by Steve Wariner
- Released: October 22, 1991
- Recorded: 1991
- Studio: Nightingale Studio and Masterfonics (Nashville, Tennessee)
- Genre: Country
- Length: 36:32
- Label: Arista Nashville
- Producer: Scott Hendricks, Tim DuBois

Steve Wariner chronology
Laredo (1990)	I Am Ready (1991)	Drive (1994)

Singles from I Am Ready
- 1. "Leave Him Out of This" Released: September 16, 1991; 2. "The Tips of My Fingers" Released: February 8, 1992; 3. "A Woman Loves" Released: May 30, 1992; 4. "Crash Course in the Blues" Released: September 12, 1992; 5. "Like a River to the Sea" Released: February 20, 1993

Professional ratings
Review scores
Source	Rating
AllMusic	link
Entertainment Weekly	B− link

I Am Ready is American country music artist Steve Wariner's tenth studio album. It was released in 1991 on Arista Nashville as his first for the label, following his departure from MCA Records. Singles from the album include "Leave Him Out of This", "The Tips of My Fingers" (a cover of Bill Anderson's 1960 hit), "A Woman Loves", "Crash Course in the Blues" and "Like a River to the Sea". Respectively, these reached #6, #3, #9, #32 and #30 on the Billboard country charts. The album was certified gold by the RIAA, and was Wariner's first album to achieve that certification.

== Track listing ==
No.	Title	Writer(s)	Length
1.	"On My Heart Again"	Bob DiPiero, Dennis Robbins, John Scott Sherrill	2:51
2.	"The Tips of My Fingers"	Bill Anderson	3:39
3.	"When Will I Let Go"	Steve Wariner, Jim Weatherly	3:10
4.	"Leave Him Out of This"	Walt Aldridge, Susan Longacre	3:56
5.	"Like a River to the Sea"	Wariner	4:36
6.	"Everything's Gonna Be Alright"	Bill LaBounty, Wariner	4:02
7.	"A Woman Loves""	Steve Bogard, Rick Giles	3:53
8.	"My, How The Time Don't Fly""	Kent Robbins, Wariner	3:40
9.	"Gone Out of My Mind"	Gene Dobbins, Michael Huffman, Bob Morrison	3:12
10.	"Crash Course in the Blues"	Don Cook, John Barlow Jarvis, Wariner	3:53

== Production ==
- Tim DuBois – producer
- Scott Hendricks – producer, engineer, mixing, additional recording
- Bill Deaton – engineer
- Mike Clute – additional recording
- John Kunz – additional recording, assistant mix engineer
- Brad Jones – assistant mix engineer
- Gary Paczosa – assistant mix engineer
- Greg Parker – assistant mix engineer
- Glenn Meadows – digital editing at Masterfonics
- Denny Purcell – mastering at Georgetown Masters (Nashville, Tennessee)
- Ramona Simmons – project administrator
- Maude Gilman – art direction, design
- Mark Seliger – photography
- Mary Beth Felts – grooming
- Profile – styling
- Vector Management – management

== Personnel ==
- Steve Wariner – vocals, backing vocals (2, 3, 8), Del Vecchio guitar (5), acoustic guitar solo (6), electric guitar solo (8) electric guitars (10)
- John Barlow Jarvis – acoustic piano (1, 2, 4, 7, 9, 10), Wurlitzer electric piano (3, 8), keyboards (6)
- Bill Cuomo – organ (2, 7), acoustic piano (3), keyboards (4, 5)
- Scott Hendricks – "power" piano (4), acoustic guitars (4), electric guitars (7), floor tom (8)
- Steve Gibson – electric 12-string guitar (1), mandolin (3), electric guitars (4)
- Mac McAnally – acoustic guitars, backing vocals (3, 7–9)
- Reggie Young – electric guitars
- Albert Lee – electric guitars (10)
- Sonny Garrish – steel guitar (1–7, 9)
- Buddy Emmons – steel guitar (6)
- Bruce Bouton – steel guitar (8)
- Allyn Love – steel guitar (9)
- David Hungate – bass guitar
- Eddie Bayers – drums
- Terry McMillan – percussion (3, 5, 6), harmonica (10)
- Mark O'Connor – fiddle (2, 3, 5, 9, 10)
- Bob DiPiero – backing vocals (1)
- John Scott Sherrill – backing vocals (1)
- Vince Gill – backing vocals (2, 4)
- Andrea Zonn – backing vocals (2)
- Billy Thomas – backing vocals (4, 7)
- Harry Stinson – backing vocals (6)
- Wendy Waldman – backing vocals (6)
- Carol Chase – backing vocals (9)

== Chart performance ==
Chart (1991)	Peak position
U.S. Billboard Top Country Albums	28
U.S. Billboard 200	180
Canadian RPM Country Albums	16
