= I Should Be with You (song) =

Single by Steve Wariner

from the album I Should Be with You
- B-side: "Caught Between Your Duty and Your Dream"
- Released: June 18, 1988
- Genre: Country
- Length: 3:29
- Label: MCA
- Songwriter(s): Steve Wariner
- Producer(s): Jimmy Bowen, Steve Wariner

Steve Wariner singles chronology
"Baby I'm Yours" (1988)	"I Should Be with You" (1988)	"Hold On (A Little Longer)" (1988)

"I Should Be with You" is a song written and recorded by American country music artist Steve Wariner. It was released in June 1988 as the second single and title track from the album I Should Be with You. The song reached #2 on the Billboard Hot Country Singles chart.

== Charts ==
=== Weekly charts ===
Chart (1988)	Peak position
US Adult Contemporary (Billboard)	43
US Hot Country Songs (Billboard)	2
Canadian RPM Country Tracks	1

=== Year-end charts ===
Chart (1988)	Position
Canadian RPM Country Tracks	19
US Hot Country Songs (Billboard)	16
