= Precious Thing =

Single by Steve Wariner

from the album Laredo
- B-side: "She's in Love"
- Released: July 21, 1990
- Genre: Country
- Length: 2:48
- Label: MCA
- Songwriters: Steve Wariner, Mac McAnally
- Producer: Tony Brown

Steve Wariner singles chronology
"The Domino Theory" (1990)	"Precious Thing" (1990)	"There for Awhile" (1990)

"Precious Thing" is a song co-written and recorded by American country music artist Steve Wariner. It was released in July 1990 as the second single from the album Laredo. The song reached #8 on the Billboard Hot Country Singles & Tracks chart. Wariner wrote the song with Mac McAnally.

== Chart performance ==
Chart (1990)	Peak position
Canada Country Singles (RPM)	13
US Hot Country Songs (Billboard)	8
