= Laredo (album) =

Studio album by Steve Wariner
- Released: February 28, 1990
- Recorded: 1989
- Studio: GroundStar Laboratories, Sound Emporium Studios and Sound Stage Studios (Nashville, Tennessee); Scruggs Sound Studio (Berry Hill, Tennessee)
- Genre: Country
- Length: 34:38
- Label: MCA Records
- Producer: Tony Brown; Garth Fundis; Randy Scruggs

Steve Wariner chronology
I Got Dreams (1989)	Laredo (1990)	I Am Ready (1991)

Singles from Laredo
- 1. "The Domino Theory" Released: March 17, 1990; 2. "Precious Thing" Released: July 21, 1990; 3. "There for Awhile" Released: November 10, 1990

Professional ratings
Review scores
Source	Rating
Allmusic	3/5 stars

Laredo is the ninth studio album by American country music artist Steve Wariner. His last release for MCA Records, it produced three chart singles on the Billboard country charts: "The Domino Theory" at #7, "Precious Thing" at #8, and "There for Awhile" at #17. After the final single charted, Wariner was dropped from MCA's roster. He later signed to Arista Records in 1991 for the release of his next album, 1991's I Am Ready.

Tracks 1, 6, 8, and 9 were produced by Randy Scruggs, tracks 2, 3, and 7 by Tony Brown, and tracks 4, 5, and 10 by Garth Fundis.

== Track listing ==
No.	Title	Writer(s)	Length
1.	"I Can See Arkansas"	Wood Newton, James Nihan	3:00
2.	"Precious Thing"	Steve Wariner, Mac McAnally	2:46
3.	"Where Fools Are Kings"	Jeffrey Steele	4:02
4.	"L-O-V-E, Love"	Wariner, Lisa Silver	2:51
5.	"She's in Love""	Mike Reid, Rory Bourke	3:09
6.	"The Domino Theory"	Bill LaBounty, Beckie Foster	3:36
7.	"There for Awhile"	Curtis Wright, Anna Lisa Graham	4:18
8.	"I Wanna Go Back"	Wariner	3:40
9.	"While I'm Holding You Tonight"	Wariner, Roger Murrah	3:13
10.	"When Times Were Hard"	Wariner, Don Schlitz	3:39

== Personnel ==
- Steve Wariner – lead vocals, acoustic guitar, electric guitar
- David Briggs – keyboards
- John Jarvis – keyboards
- Steve Nathan – keyboards
- Matt Rollings – keyboards
- Steve Gibson – electric guitar
- Brent Mason – electric guitar
- Mac McAnally – acoustic guitar, backing vocals
- Randy Scruggs – acoustic guitar
- Reggie Young – electric guitar
- Jerry Douglas – dobro
- Paul Franklin –steel guitar, lap steel guitar, pedabro
- Sam Bush – mandolin
- Mark O'Connor – mandolin, fiddle
- David Hungate – bass guitar
- Dave Pomeroy – bass guitar
- Michael Rhodes – bass guitar
- Eddie Bayers – drums
- Rob Hajacos – fiddle
- Charlie McCoy – harmonica
- Bruce Dees – backing vocals
- Garth Fundis – backing vocals
- Mike Reid – backing vocals
- Harry Stinson – backing vocals
- Wendy Waldman – backing vocals

=== Production ===
- Randy Scruggs – producer (1, 6, 8, 9)
- Tony Brown – producer (2, 3, 7)
- Garth Fundis – producer (4, 5, 10), recording (4, 5, 10), mixing (4, 5, 10)
- Ron Reynolds – recording (1, 6, 8, 9), mixing (1, 6, 8, 9)
- Chuck Ainlay – recording (2, 3, 7), mixing (2, 3, 7)
- Gary Laney – recording (4, 5, 10), mixing (4, 5, 10)
- Clay Meyers – second engineer (1, 6, 8, 9)
- Russ Martin – second engineer (2, 3, 7)
- Keith Odle – second engineer (4, 5, 10)
- Milan Bogdan – digital editing
- Glenn Meadows – mastering at Masterfonics (Nashville, Tennessee)
- Virginia Team – art direction
- Jerry Joyner – design
- Mark Tucker – photography
- Vector Management – management

== Charts ==
=== Weekly charts ===
Chart (1990)	Peak position
US Top Country Albums (Billboard)	20

=== Year-end charts ===
Chart (1990)	Position
US Top Country Albums (Billboard)	64
