= Feed This Fire =

Single by Anne Murray

from the album You Will
- Released: August 25, 1990
- Genre: Country
- Length: 2:59
- Label: Capitol Nashville
- Songwriter: Hugh Prestwood
- Producer: Jerry Crutchfield

Anne Murray singles chronology
"I'd Fall in Love Tonight" (1990)	"Feed This Fire" (1990)	"Bluebird" (1990)

"Feed This Fire" is a song written by Hugh Prestwood, and first recorded by American country music group Highway 101 on their 1988 album 101². The group did not release it as a single. The song was then recorded by Canadian country music artist Anne Murray in early 1990 for a summer release to radio. Murray's version was released in August 1990 as the first single from her album You Will. The song reached number six on the Canadian RPM Country Tracks chart in November 1990. In the U.S., the song peaked at number five on the Billboard Hot Country Singles chart for the week ending Saturday, November 10, 1990. It was Murray's last Billboard top ten country single in the United States.

== Chart performance ==
Chart (1990)	Peak position
Canada Adult Contemporary (RPM)	2
Canada Country Singles (RPM)	6
US Hot Country Songs (Billboard)	5

=== Year-end charts ===
Chart (1990)	Position
Canada Adult Contemporary Tracks (RPM)	3
Canada Country Tracks (RPM)	49
