= Talk Memphis (Toni Price album) =

Studio album by Toni Price
- Released: October 2, 2007
- Genre: Blues rock
- Length: 45:25
- Label: Texas Music Group
- Producer: Derek O'Brien

Toni Price chronology
Born to Be Blue (2003)	Talk Memphis (2007)	Cherry Sunday Orchestra (2010)

Talk Memphis is an album by Austin, Texas-based blues singer Toni Price, released on October 2, 2007. Price moved to San Diego shortly before the album's release. The album's title—and that of its title track—was originally the name of a Jesse Winchester album and its title track.

== Reception ==
Professional ratings
Review scores
Source	Rating
AllMusic	4/5 stars
The Austin Chronicle	3.5/5 stars
Billboard	(positive)
Robert Christgau	(choice cut)

Some critics have noted that Talk Memphis contains many songs by artists from Memphis, and that it is therefore dedicated to the "sounds" of that city. Others, however, have compared its music to that from Price's hometown of Austin, Texas.

== Track listing ==
No.	Title	Length
1.	"Talk Memphis"	3:45
2.	"What I'm Puttin' Down"	3:52
3.	"Mean Man"	2:51
4.	"Am I Groovin' U?"	3:35
5.	"Leftover Love"	2:52
6.	"Gravy"	4:24
7.	"Sunflower"	3:33
8.	"Right Where I Belong"	3:52
9.	"Poor Little Fool"	3:27
10.	"Runnin' Out"	3:20
11.	"Sorry About That"	2:43
12.	"99 Pounds"	3:26
13.	"The Power"	3:45

== Charts ==
Chart	Peak position
US Top Blues Albums (Billboard)	13
