= Look What Followed Me Home =

Single by David Ball

from the album Thinkin' Problem
- B-side: "What Do You Want with His Love"
- Released: January 14, 1995
- Genre: Country
- Length: 2:59
- Label: Warner Bros. Nashville
- Songwriters: David Ball, Tommy Polk
- Producer: Blake Chancey

David Ball singles chronology
"When the Thought of You Catches Up with Me" (1994)	"Look What Followed Me Home" (1995)	"What You Do You Want with His Love" (1995)

"Look What Followed Me Home" is a song co-written and recorded by American country music artist David Ball. It was released in January 1995 as the third single from the album Thinkin' Problem. The song reached number 11 on the Billboard Hot Country Singles & Tracks chart.

The song's B-side, "What Do You Want with His Love", was the album's fourth single, released in May 1995. "What Do You Want with His Love" peaked at number 48 on the same chart.

== Chart performance ==
Chart (1995)	Peak position
Canada Country Singles (RPM)	14
US Hot Country Songs (Billboard)	11
