= Sparkle City (album) =

Studio album by David Ball
- Released: April 20, 2010
- Studio: Legends Studio, Nashville, Tennessee
- Genre: Country
- Length: 34:48
- Label: Red Dirt/E1
- Producer: David Ball; Dan Frizsell

David Ball chronology
Heartaches by the Number (2007)	Sparkle City (2010)	The Greatest Christmas (2011)

Sparkle City is the eighth album by David Ball. The album was released on April 20, 2010 by Red Dirt/E1.

== Critical reception ==
Professional ratings
Review scores
Source	Rating
AllMusic	3.5/5 stars
Nashville Music Guide	7/10 stars
Country Music News	4.5/5 stars

William Ruhlmann of AllMusic says, "He never tries to do too much, satisfying himself to stay within the stylistic confines of traditional honky tonk country, and yet he is enough of a stylist not to come off as generic. It would be easy to imagine some of the songs here competing with George Strait's on the country charts, given the right exposure."

Nashville Music Guide gives the album 7 stars out of 10 and writes, "This album is a great blend: ranging from boogie-woogie and Texas swing, to romantic ballad and even a dash of Mexican flare."

David McGee of The Bluegrass Special concludes his review, "With his basic band, simply told tales, pleasant Tennessee drawl and genial personality, Ball has made yet another worthy stand for straight ahead country, undiluted by any influences save those that would be sanctioned by Hank Williams and Marty Robbins, both of whose spirits are engaged here. Ramblin’ fever is highly infectious."

Rick Bell reviews the album for Country Standard Time and concludes with, "If the longtime veteran only resurfaces with a new release every six years or so, then so be it. An album like "Sparkle City" is well worth the wait."

Gunther Matejka of Country Music News out of Germany rates the album 4½ stars out of 5 and finishes with "Conclusion : The veteran is still on an experimental course - with Texas swing, rock 'n' roll, blues and jazzy revue numbers. A strong sign of life for the singer and songwriter."

== Track listing ==
All tracks are written by David Ball, with additional co-writers as noted.

No.	Title	Writer(s)	Length
1.	"Hot Water Pipe"		3:12
2.	"Country Boy Boogie"		2:36
3.	"Just Along for the Ride"		3:29
4.	"Tulsa"		3:08
5.	"Maybe Tomorrow"		3:00
6.	"What'll I Do If I Don't Have You"	Lawrence Russell Brown	2:48
7.	"Smiling in the Morning"		2:46
8.	"Back to Alabama"		3:48
9.	"On Top of the World"		3:16
10.	"Houston Again"	Brown	2:38
11.	"So Long"	Brown	4:07
Total length:			34:48

== Musicians ==
- David Ball – Acoustic Guitar, Vocals
- The Pioneer Playboys – Band
  - Scott Metko – Drums
  - Troy Cook Jr. – Guitar
  - Billy Pierce – Bass
- Chris Carmichael – Strings on "What'll I Do If I Don't Have You"
- Perry Coleman – Background Vocals
- Musicians on "Tulsa"
  - Jeff Taylor
  - J. T. Corenflos – Electric Guitar
  - Owen Hale – Drums
  - Larry Paxton – Bass
  - Mike Rojas – Piano
  - Perry Coleman – Background Vocals
  - Mike Johnson – Steel Guitar

== Production ==
- David Ball – Producer
- Dan Frizsell – Engineer, Mastering, Mixing, Musician, Producer
- Glabersoni Cook – Artwork, Photography
- Nate Ewing – Design
- Mark McIntosh – Design

Track information and credits adapted from Discogs and AllMusic. Track information and credits also verified from the album's liner notes.
