= The Belleville Outfit =

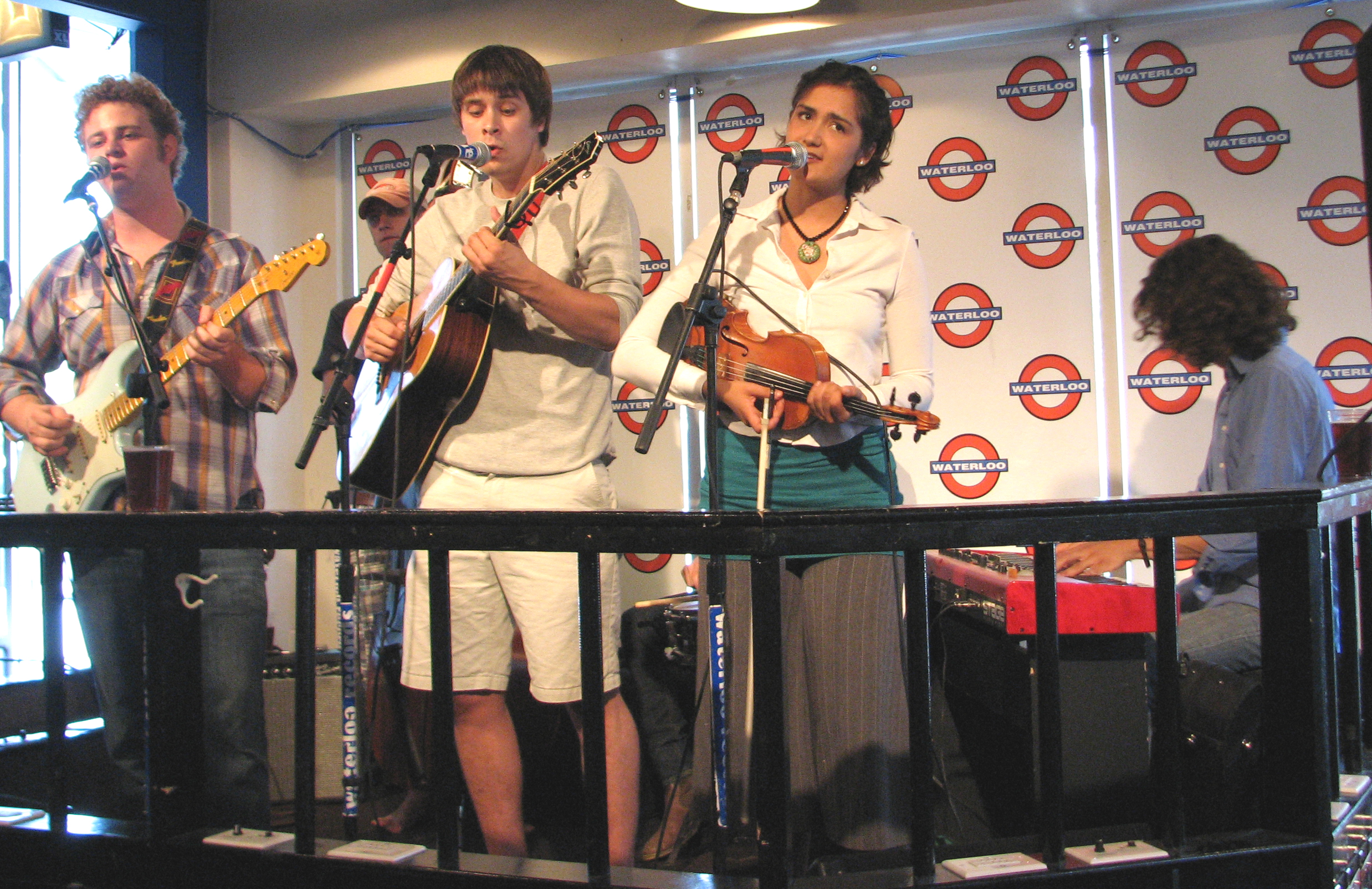
- The Belleville Outfit perform in Waterloo Records, Austin, TX, May 27, 2009

Background information
- Origin: Austin, Texas, USA
- Genres: Folk, Western Swing
- Years active: 2007–2011
- Labels: Thirty Tigers
- Past members: Rob Teter; Connor Forsyth; Jonathan Konya; Nigel Frye; Marshall Hood; Phoebe Hunt; Jeff Brown
- Website: bellevilleoutfit.com

The Belleville Outfit was a cross-genre American folk band based out of Austin, Texas. Their sound has been described as "a mix of gypsy swing, big band jazz and cross-genre Americana music". In April 2007, after three days of practice, they performed their first gig at MerleFest in North Wilkesboro, North Carolina. Members Rob Teter and Marshall Hood are from Spartanburg, South Carolina. Additional band members were recruited through connections Rob had made while studying music business at Loyola University New Orleans of New Orleans, Louisiana. Fellow students Jonathan Konya and Connor Forsyth left New Orleans for Austin to join the band that was to become The Belleville Outfit. Marshall Hood invited Austin's darling Phoebe Hunt, who had been playing with the folk band The Hudsons out of Austin for four years. When the original bassist Jeff Brown retired from the Belleville Outfit to pursue a career riding sharks in the pacific, Forsyth brought in Nigel Frye, a talented bassist he knew from Tulsa, Oklahoma who had previously quit music all together, and was living out his life as a meat inspector.

After releasing Wanderin' in February 2008 and Time to Stand in May 2009, the band was nominated for "best new and emerging artist" by the Americana Music Association.

Although the band was based in Austin, The Belleville Outfit is named for New Orleans, Louisiana, where Rob, Jon, and Connor met while studying the business of music management. Belle Ville means 'beautiful city' in French.

== History ==
After DesChamps "Champ" Hood (August 16, 1952 - November 3, 2001) of Uncle Walt's Band died, nephew Marshall Hood returned to Spartanburg, South Carolina inspired to play the guitar. Marshall Hood formed The DesChamps Band in March 2002 with friends Rob Teter and The Belleville Outfit's original bassist Jeff Brown. A year later, they recruited Matt Parks on fiddle to help create a tighter and more intimate vocal section. They regularly performed songs from the Uncle Walt's Band and eventually released 2 CDs. In April 2007, The DesChamps Band played a reunion performance (sans Parks) in Spartanburg. Phoebe Hunt, Conor Forsyth and Jonathan Konya were invited to perform as special guests that evening. A few days later, Teter, Marshall Hood & Brown, along with Hunt, Forsyth and Konya played as The Belleville Outfit at MerleFest. Although they performed and recorded mainly their own original material, The Belleville Outfit included songs from the Uncle Walt's Band in their shows as well as each of their CDs. On February 2, 2011, the band announced they would be disbanding.

== Discography ==
- Wanderin' (2008)

1. Somebody Like You
2. Caroline
3. Wanderin'
4. Wonder Why
5. Don't Take It for Granted
6. Ease My Mind
7. Houston Town
8. It's a Good Day
9. Been Here Before
10. Warm Summer's Evening
11. Tell Her for Me When I'm Gone
12. Too Far to Fall

- Time to Stand (2009)

1. Time to Stand
2. Sunday Morning
3. Nothing's Too Good for My Baby
4. Let Me Go
5. Once and for All
6. Two Days of Darkness
7. Good as It Gets
8. She Went Away
9. Fly On
10. Safe
11. Will This End in Tears
12. Outside Looking Out
13. Love Me Like I Love You

== Members ==
- Rob Teter aka Ron TarTar (guitar, vocals)
- Connor "Corndog" Forsyth (piano, vocals)
- Nigel Frye (bass)
- Marshall Hood (guitar, vocals)
- Phoebe Hunt (violin, vocals)
- Jonathan Konya aka Little Guy (drums, animal wrangler)

== Former members ==
- Jeff Brown (bass, vocals)
