= Wood Newton =

American singer-songwriter

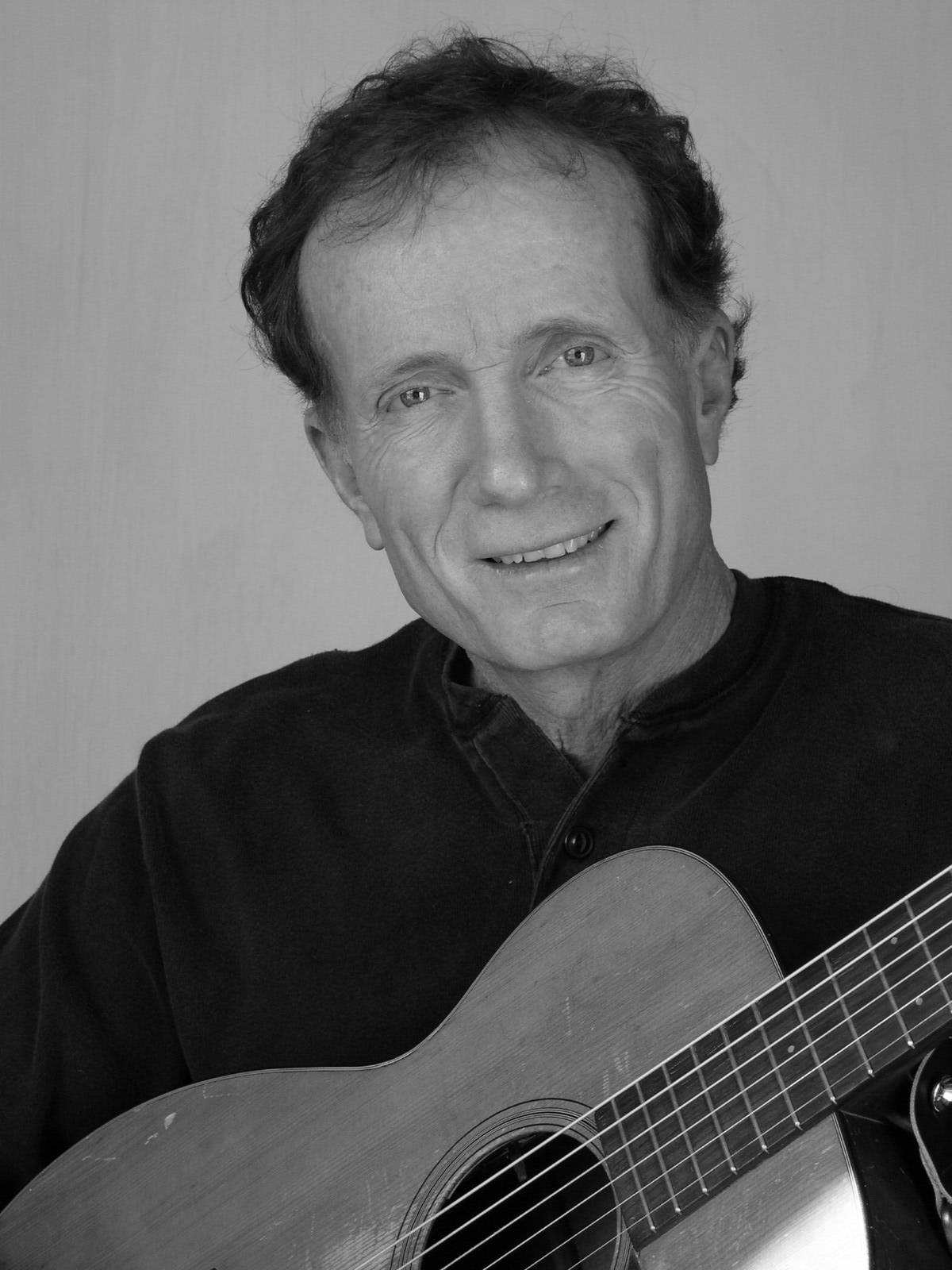

Background information
- Born: September 16, 1946 (age 79); Hampton, Arkansas, U.S.
- Genres: Country
- Occupation: Singer-songwriter
- Instruments: Vocals, guitar, piano
- Years active: 1976–present
- Labels: Elektra Records

Wood Newton (born September 16, 1946 in Hampton, Arkansas, United States) is an American songwriter and musician based in Nashville, Tennessee. Newton was born in Hampton, Arkansas, and graduated from Hampton High School in Hampton, Arkansas in 1964. He graduated from the University of Arkansas in 1970.

In 1978 and 1979, Newton recorded for Elektra Records, charting the singles "Last Exit for Love", "Lock, Stock & Barrel" and "Julie (Do I Ever Cross Your Mind?)". He later became a songwriter for other artists, with his credits including Razzy Bailey's number one single "Midnight Hauler".

June 3, 2024 The Arkansas Country Music Association awarded Wood Newton, their Lifetime Achievement Award. This year‘s inductees along with Wood were KT Oslin, and Randy Goodrum.

== Live performances ==
Newton performs on a regular basis with solo guitar, and vocals.

== Discography ==
=== Albums ===
Year	Album
1979	Wood Newton

=== Singles ===
Year	Single	Chart Positions	Album
Year	Single	US Country	Album
1978	"Last Exit for Love"	52	Wood Newton
1979	"Lock, Stock & Barrel"	44	Wood Newton
1979	"Julie (Do I Ever Cross Your Mind?)"	81	Wood Newton

== Chart singles ==
The following is a list of Wood Newton compositions that were chart hits.

Year	Single Title	Recording Artist	Chart Positions		
Year	Single Title	Recording Artist	Billboard Hot 100	Billboard AC	Billboard Country
1981	Midnight Hauler co-written with Tim DuBois	Razzy Bailey			1
1982	Bobbie Sue co-written with Dan Tyler and Adele Tyler	The Oak Ridge Boys	12	19	1
1982	Blue Rendezvous co-written with Tim DuBois	Lloyd David Foster			32
1983	Unfinished Business co-written with Danny Morrison	Lloyd David Foster			32
1984	Something Said Love co-written with Jerry Michael	Rita Coolidge		15	
1985	I Want Everyone to Cry co-written with Michael Noble	Restless Heart			10
1985	What I Didn't Do co-written with Michael Noble	Steve Wariner			3
1987	Twenty Years Ago co-written with Dan Tyler, Michael Noble, and C. Michael Spriggs	Kenny Rogers		15	2
1993	Fool to Fall co-written with Larry Stewart	Pearl River			62
2001	Riding with Private Malone co-written with Thom Shepherd	David Ball	36		2

== Songs written by Wood Newton ==
- Razzy Bailey – "Midnight Hauler", "Blind Faith and the Naked Truth", "Twenty Years Ago"
- The Oak Ridge Boys – "Bobbie Sue"
- Restless Heart – "I Want Everyone to Cry"
- Steve Wariner – "What I Didn't Do", "Do You Want To Make Something of It", "I Can See Arkansas", "The Heartland"
- Kenny Rogers – "Twenty Years Ago", "I'll Be There For You"
- Pearl River – "Fool to Fall"
- David Ball – "Riding with Private Malone", "Happy with the One I've Got", "I Can See Arkansas", "Loser Friendly", "She Always Talked About Mexico", "Swing Baby", "Too Much Blood in My Alcohol Level", "Violence and Lies"
- Tracy Byrd - "Pink Flamingos"
- Conway Twitty - "Every Time I Think It's Over"
- T. G. Sheppard - "A Little Less Blue"
- Alabama - "All Together Now"
- Charley Pride - "Just for the Love of It", "Lonestar Lonely"
- B. J. Thomas - "I Want Everyone to Cry", "The Girl Most Likely To"
- Martin Delray - "Lillie's White Lies", "One in a Row"
- Bjøro Håland - "Blue Rendezvous", "If I Could Make A Living Loving You", "Making Future Memories", "She's Not Leaving, She's Gone", "The Door", "The Name of the Game is Cheating", "What I Didn't Do"
- Lloyd David Foster - "Blue Rendezvous"
