= David Ball (country singer) =

American singer-songwriter (born 1953)

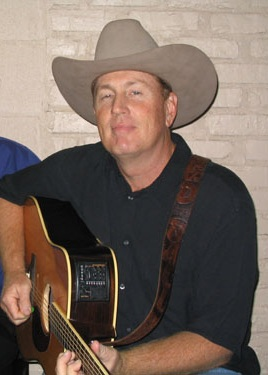
- David Ball – 2004

Background information
- Born: David Alderman Ball; July 9, 1953 (age 72); Rock Hill, South Carolina, U.S.
- Origin: Spartanburg, South Carolina, U.S.
- Genres: Country
- Occupation: Singer-songwriter
- Instruments: Vocals, rhythm guitar
- Years active: 1988–present
- Labels: RCA Nashville; Warner Bros. Nashville; Dualtone; Wildcatter; Shanachie
- Formerly of: Uncle Walt's Band
- Website: davidball.com

David Alderman Ball (born July 9, 1953) is an American country music singer-songwriter and musician. Active since 1988, he has recorded a total of seven studio albums on several labels, including his platinum certified debut Thinkin' Problem. Fourteen of Ball's singles have entered the Billboard Hot Country Songs charts. His highest-peaking chart entries are 1994's "Thinkin' Problem" and 2001's "Riding With Private Malone", both of which peaked at No. 2.

== Biography ==
David Ball was born into a large musical family headed by his father, William "Billy" Ball, a Baptist minister, and his mother, Bessie Ball, a pianist. Later, he moved with his family to Spartanburg, South Carolina, where his father was pastor of Fernwood Baptist church. He eventually learned to play guitar after persuading his parents to buy him one. Having written his first song in seventh grade, he played it in a school talent show with a band he had formed, the Strangers. Afterwards, he played upright bass in various local youth groups and also the school orchestra. Together with friends, he took part in various bluegrass and country festivals in the Carolinas.

By the time Ball had left high school, he had a gig playing bass in Uncle Walt's Band, a trio headed by Walter Hyatt, who relocated to Austin, Texas, in the mid-1970s, in an attempt to make a mainstream breakthrough.

Ball subsequently focused on a solo career, moving to Nashville, Tennessee, where he was signed to a publishing contract. Three singles for RCA Nashville in the late 1980s failed to provide a solo breakthrough, however, and a projected album was shelved and was not released until 1994. The experience did at least serve to introduce him to producer Blake Chancey, son of country producer Ron Chancey. In the spring of 1993, Chancey called Warner Bros. Records director Doug Grau on Ball's behalf.

A new recording contract followed. Thinkin' Problem, his debut album, was released on Warner Bros. Its title track served as the lead-off single, reaching No. 2 on the Billboard country music charts and No. 40 on the Billboard Hot 100. The album, which received a platinum certification in the U.S., also produced the singles "When the Thought of You Catches Up with Me", "Look What Followed Me Home", "What Do You Want with His Love", and "Honky Tonk Healin'", although the latter two singles failed to make Top 40 on the country charts.

Ball recorded two more albums for the label – Starlite Lounge and Play – without much chart success. However, "Riding with Private Malone", from the 2001 album Amigo on the Dualtone label, reached a peak of No. 2 on the Billboard Hot Country Singles & Tracks charts (now Hot Country Songs) chart, and No. 36 on the Billboard Hot 100. This album failed to produce any other hits, however, and Ball exited Dualtone in 2002. Freewheeler followed in 2004, Heartaches by the Number in 2007 and Sparkle City in 2010.

In the 1995 album "Come Together: America Salutes The Beatles" David Ball's version of "I'll Follow The Sun" starts off the collection of Beatles songs by other artists.

Ball's "Thinkin' Problem" was parodied by Cledus T. Judd. Ball then appears in Judd's Shania Twain parody "If Shania Was Mine", standing behind the cameras and saying, "At least he's not picking on me this time."

== Discography ==
=== Studio albums ===
Title	Album details	Peak chart positions				Certifications (sales thresholds)
Title	Album details	US Country	US	CAN Country	CAN	Certifications (sales thresholds)
David Ball	Release date: November 22, 1989; Label: RCA Nashville	—	—	—	—	
Thinkin' Problem	Release date: June 14, 1994; Label: Warner Bros. Nashville	6	53	3	55	US: Platinum; CAN: Platinum
Starlite Lounge	Release date: June 25, 1996; Label: Warner Bros. Nashville	44	—	—	—	
Play	Release date: July 31, 1999; Label: Warner Bros. Nashville	60	—	21	—	
Amigo	Release date: October 2, 2001; Label: Dualtone Records	11	120	—	—	
Freewheeler	Release date: November 16, 2004; Label: Wildcatter	—	—	—	—	
Heartaches by the Number	Release date: March 27, 2007; Label: Shanachie Records	—	—	—	—	
Sparkle City	Release date: April 20, 2010; Label: Red Dirt/E1	—	—	—	—	
The Greatest Christmas (as David Ball & The Pioneer Playboys)	Release date: 2011; Label: self-released	—	—	—	—	
Come See Me	Release date: September 7, 2018; Label: Public Records	—	—	—	—	
"—" denotes releases that did not chart

=== Compilation albums ===
Title	Album details
Super Hits	Release date: July 18, 2000; Label: Warner Bros. Nashville
Thinkin' Problem (25th Anniversary)	Release date: September 18, 2019; Label: Omnivore

=== Singles ===
Year	Single	Peak chart positions			Album
Year	Single	US Country	US	CAN Country	Album
1988	"Steppin' Out"	46	—	—	—N/a
1988	"You Go, You're Gone"	55	—	68	—N/a
1989	"Gift of Love"	64	—	80	Steppin' Out
1994	"Thinkin' Problem"	2	40	1	Thinkin' Problem
1994	"When the Thought of You Catches Up with Me"	7	107	6	Thinkin' Problem
1995	"Look What Followed Me Home"	11	—	14	Thinkin' Problem
1995	"What Do You Want with His Love"	48	—	56	Thinkin' Problem
1995	"Honky Tonk Healin'"	50	—	50	Thinkin' Problem
1996	"Circle of Friends"	49	—	42	Starlite Lounge
1996	"Hangin' In and Hangin' On"	67	—	—	Starlite Lounge
1996	"I'll Never Make It Through This Fall"	—	—	—	Starlite Lounge
1999	"Watching My Baby Not Coming Back"	47	—	76	Play
1999	"I Want to with You"	67	—	—	Play
2001	"Riding with Private Malone"	2	36	—	Amigo
2002	"She Always Talked About Mexico"	—	—	—	Amigo
2002	"Whenever You Come Back to Me"	—	—	—	Amigo
2004	"Louisiana Melody"	60	—	—	Freewheeler
2005	"Happy with the One I've Got"	—	—	—	Freewheeler
2005	"Too Much Blood in My Alcohol Level"	—	—	—	Freewheeler
2010	"Hot Water Pipe"	—	—	—	Sparkle City
"—" denotes releases that did not chart

=== Music videos ===
Year	Video	Director
1989	"Gift of Love"	Jim May
1994	"Thinkin' Problem"	O Pictures
1994	"When the Thought of You Catches Up with Me"	Chris Rogers
1995	"Look What Followed Me Home"	Martin Kahan
1995	"What Do You Want with His Love"	Michael Salomon
1995	"Honky Tonk Healin'"	David Ball
1996	"Circle of Friends"	Steven T. Miller
1996	"Hangin' In and Hangin' On"	Suzanne Gordon
1999	"Watching My Baby Not Coming Back"	
2001	"Riding with Private Malone"	Steve Schepman
2005	"Too Much Blood in My Alcohol Level"	David Kiern
2010	"Hot Water Pipe"	

== Awards and nominations ==
=== Grammy Awards ===
Year	Nominee / work	Award	Result
1995	"Thinkin' Problem"	Best Male Country Vocal Performance	Nominated

=== TNN/Music City News Country Awards & CMT Flameworthy Awards ===
Year	Nominee / work	Award	Result
1995	David Ball	Male Star of Tomorrow	Nominated
2002	"Riding with Private Malone"	Love Your Country Video of the Year	Nominated

=== Academy of Country Music Awards ===
Year	Nominee / work	Award	Result
1989	David Ball	Top New Male Vocalist	Shortlisted
1995	David Ball	Top New Male Vocalist	Nominated

=== Country Music Association Awards ===
Year	Nominee / work	Award	Result
1995	David Ball	Horizon Award	Nominated
1995	"Thinkin' Problem"	Song of the Year	Nominated
