= Toni Price =

American singer (1961–2024)

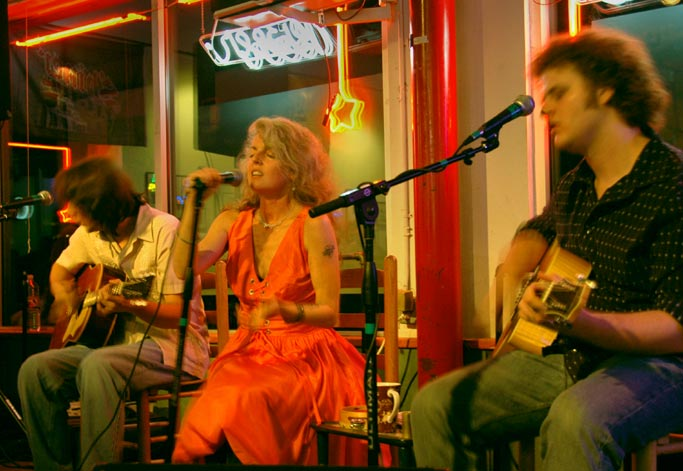
Price (center) in 2006

Toni Price or Luiese Esther Price (March 13, 1961 – November 22, 2024) was an American country blues singer from Austin, Texas, United States. Price began her career in Nashville, where she recorded a few country and western singles. However, after accepting an invitation to play at the South by Southwest music festival she moved to Austin and released her second of numerous albums. Price won awards for Female Vocalist of the Year (1994–97), Album of the Year (Hey), Song of the Year ("Tumbleweed"), and Blues Artist of the Year. In 2002, Price performed at the wedding of Julia Roberts and Daniel Moder.

== Early life ==
Price was born in Philadelphia, Pennsylvania on March 13, 1961. Her adoptive parents, the Prices, named her Luiese Esther Price after her grandmothers. Her first exposure to blues was through second-generation blueswoman Bonnie Raitt. Luiese later studied the recordings of women blues singers such as Sippie Wallace and Victoria Spivey, whose music has also inspired Bonnie Raitt.

Luiese moved to New Jersey, where she started schooling and began singing, then moved to Nashville, Tennessee, where a summer parks program featured a talent contest in her 10th year, which she entered as Toni Price. This was her first recorded appearance on a Nashville stage, belting out "One Tin Soldier".

Price's conservative family wasn't particularly musical: "Since I was adopted, they didn't know what to expect of me, and I believe you're born to do whatever it is you do—that maybe my [birth] parents were musical. Maybe not. But I knew as a little bitty child I was going to be a singer. I didn't know how you did it or know any musicians, but I knew I would get there."

== Career ==
Price grew musically in Nashville, where she recorded a few country and western singles. However, she felt frustrated by the "rigid" Nashville music industry. She accepted an invitation to play the South by Southwest music festival in Austin in 1989. The town's music fans "just responded so lovingly that I said that's it. I know where I belong". Here she met and learned from the locals, who included Clifford Antone, owner of Antone's blues nightclub, and Austin-area guitarists such as Derek O'Brien, who produced her second album, Hey. Shortly after she began singing in country bars in Nashville, she met songwriter Gwil Owen, who wrote eight (one co-written) of the 15 songs on her debut, Swim Away (1993). Price cites vocalists Aretha Franklin, Emmylou Harris, Linda Ronstadt, Patsy Cline, and Ray Charles as her major influences.

Swim Away and Price's second album, Hey (1995), received praise from both fans and critics. She has been often compared with Patsy Cline ("Patsy Cline on a Harley") and Bonnie Raitt. Price has won numerous awards, including Female Vocalist of the Year (1994–97), Album of the Year (Hey), Song of the Year ("Tumbleweed"), and Blues Artist of the Year. Her third album, Sol Power, was recorded at a club in Texas's remote town of Alpine. Sol Power (1999) is an acoustic live set from the Railroad Blues Club, in a tiny town in the southwestern desert lands of Texas. The landscape there inspired the band to, in Price's words, "take it to the limit". Low Down and Up (1999) followed, and then came Midnight Pumpkin, (2001), Born to Be Blue (2003), Talk Memphis (2007), and Cherry Sunday Orchestra (2010).

Except for infrequent appearances in Houston, Dallas, or an occasional music festival elsewhere, Price stayed close to home and her daughter. "I have a sweet situation here," Price told John Burnett of NPR. "I don't have to go anywhere. People come and see me and I'm so, so lucky". Price performed at the wedding of Julia Roberts and Daniel Moder in Taos, New Mexico, on July 4, 2002.

Price always performed music on her own terms, usually only on Tuesday nights, until June 2007, at the Continental Club in Austin.

Price relocated to San Diego in June 2007, but two years later, in June 2009, she moved back to Austin.

== Death ==
Price died from complications of a brain aneurysm on November 22, 2024, at the age of 63.

== Discography ==
LPs

- 1993: Swim Away (Discovery 77003)
- 1995: Hey (Discovery 77022)
- 1997: Sol Power (Discovery 74711)
- 1999: Low Down and Up (Antone's 10044)
- 2001: Midnight Pumpkin (Texas Music Group 52)
- 2003: Born to Be Blue (Texas Music Group 60)
- 2007: Talk Memphis (Texas Music Group 63)
- 2010: Cherry Sunday Orchestra (Toni Price Records)

EPs

- 1992: Toni Price Live (Toni Price Records)
- 2007: Price is Right (Antone's TMG-ANT 0064)

Appears on

- 1992: David Schnaufer - Dulcimer Sessions (SFL Records 5)
- 1992: Various Artists - Antone's Women Bringing You The Best In Blues (Antone's ANT 9902)
- 1995: Ian Moore - Live from Austin (Capricorn 947000)
- 1995: Loose Diamonds - New Location (Dos DOSCD 7010)
- 1995: Sue Foley - Big City Blues (Antone's 37)
- 1995: Various Artists - Threadgill's Supper Session Second Helpings (Watermelon WM CD 1052)
- 1996: Various Artists - Cowpunks (Vinyl Junkie VJLP002)
- 1996: Various Artists - Luxury Liner Volume 1 (Glitterhouse GRCD 413)
- 1996: Various Artists - Rig Rock Deluxe: A Musical Salute To The American Truck Driver (Upstart Sounds 025)
- 1997: 8 1/2 Souvenirs - Souvonica (Continental COTR 8123)
- 1997: Candye Kane: Diva la Grande (Discovery 74710)
- 1997: Loose Diamonds - Fresco Fiasco (Freedom 1011)
- 1998: Beaver Nelson - Last Hurrah (Freedom 1019)
- 1999: Michael Hall And The Woodpeckers - Dead By Dinner (Blue Rose BLU CD0128)
- 2000: The LeRoi Brothers - Kings of the Catnap (Rounder 37)
- 2000: Various Artists - Screamin' And Hollerin' The Blues: New Acoustic Recordings Of Pre-War Blues Classics (Shanachie 9026)
- 2001: Libbi Bosworth - Libbiville (Stark Raving 7007)
- 2001: The James Hyland Band - Place I Call Home (Tin Roof 3405)
- 2002: Various Artists - Happy Birthday Buck!: A Texas Salute To Buck Owens (Texas Music Round-Up RU2003)
- 2002: Champ Hood - Bon Haven (South Congress Records 1003)
- 2002: Roger Wallace - The Lowdown (Texas Music Group TMG-LS 4006)
- 2003: Alex Parker And Jake Parker - Music From The Motion Picture The Life Of David Gale (Decca 066 733–2)
- 2004: Various Artists - Gulf Coast Beach Blast (Texas Music Group 62)
- 2009: David Hamburger - Original Soundtrack: Wild Texas Weather (Texas Spirit Theater 5637603876
- 2009: Various Artists - Daughters of the Alamo (Retroworld / Floating World FLOATM 6022)
- 2009: Various Artists - Sing To Me: a Lullaby Album
- 2013: Two Tons of Steel - Unraveled (Smith Music Group 7173)

== See also ==
- Music of Austin
