= Aaron Tippin discography =

American country music artist

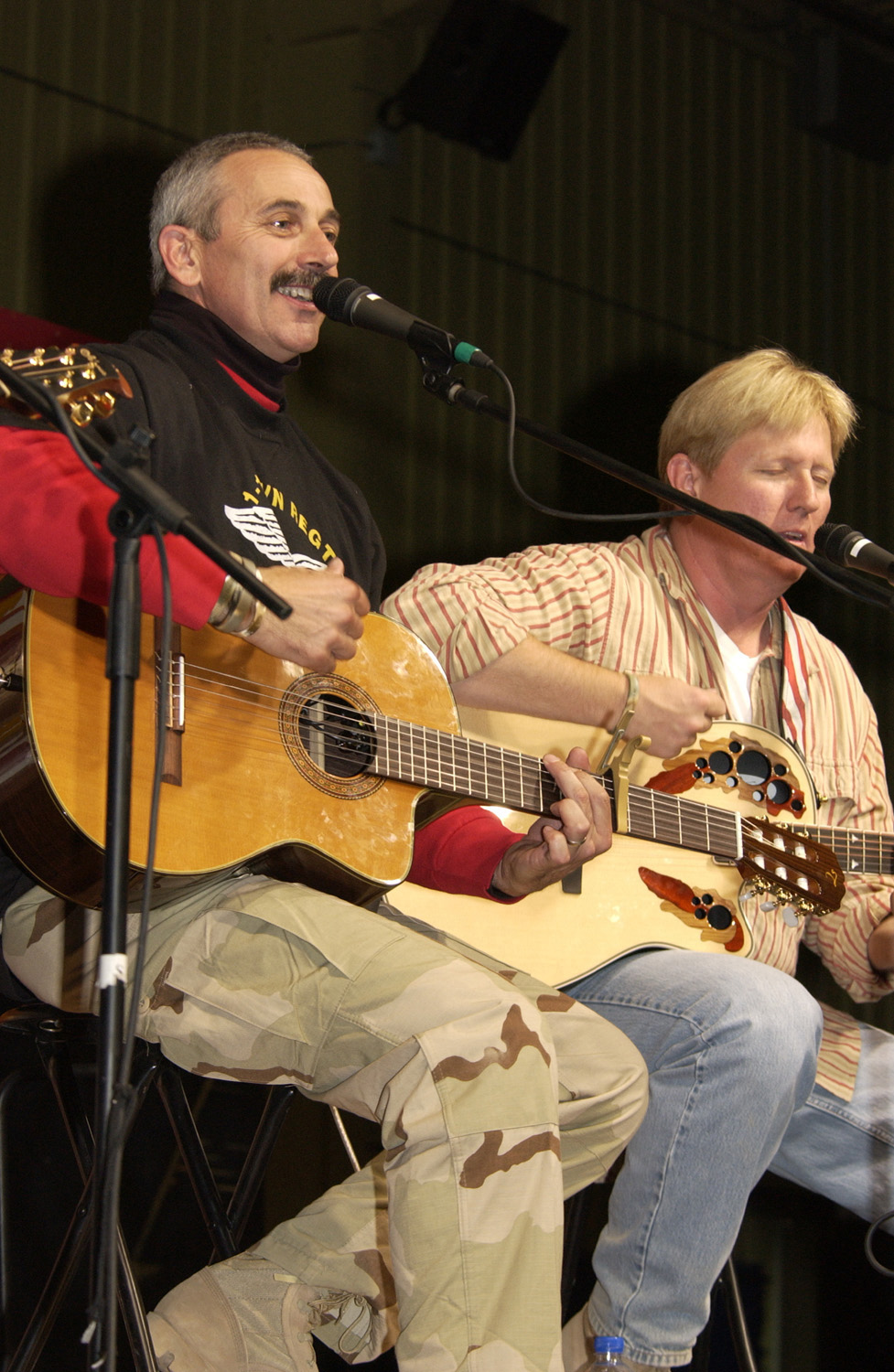
- Aaron Tippin (left) entertains the troops for Thanksgiving 2005 at FOB Speicher, Tikrit, Iraq
- Studio albums: 11
- Compilation albums: 5
- Singles: 38
- Music videos: 22
- #1 Singles: 3

Aaron Tippin is an American country music artist. His discography comprises eleven studio albums. Of his studio albums, the highest-certified is 1992's Read Between the Lines, which is certified platinum by the RIAA and gold by the CRIA. Five more studio albums — You've Got to Stand for Something (1991), Call of the Wild (1993), Lookin' Back at Myself (1994), Tool Box (1995) and People Like Us (2000) — have been certified gold by the RIAA.

Tippin has released 38 singles, of which 34 have charted on Billboard Hot Country Songs. Three became Number One hits: "There Ain't Nothin' Wrong with the Radio" (1992), "That's as Close as I'll Get to Loving You" (1995), and "Kiss This" (2000). Four of his singles have also crossed over to the Billboard Hot 100, including the number 2 country hit "Where the Stars and Stripes and the Eagle Fly" from 2001, which peaked at number 20.

== Studio albums ==
=== 1990s ===
Title	Album details	Peak chart positions			Certifications (sales thresholds)
Title	Album details	US Country	US	CAN Country	Certifications (sales thresholds)
You've Got to Stand for Something	Release date: January 22, 1991; Label: RCA Nashville; Formats: CD, cassette	23	153	—	US: Gold
Read Between the Lines	Release date: March 10, 1992; Label: RCA Nashville; Formats: CD, cassette	6	50	9	CAN: Gold; US: Platinum
Call of the Wild	Release date: August 10, 1993; Label: RCA Nashville; Formats: CD, cassette	6	53	12	US: Gold
Lookin' Back at Myself	Release date: November 8, 1994; Label: RCA Nashville; Formats: CD, cassette	19	114	—	US: Gold
Tool Box	Release date: November 21, 1995; Label: RCA Nashville; Formats: CD, cassette	12	63	—	US: Gold
What This Country Needs	Release date: October 6, 1998; Label: Lyric Street Records; Formats: CD, cassette	23	—	—	
"—" denotes releases that did not chart

=== 2000s and 2010s ===
Title	Album details	Peak chart positions		Certifications (sales thresholds)
Title	Album details	US Country	US	Certifications (sales thresholds)
People Like Us (Note: People Like Us also reached number 16 on the Canadian RPM Country Albums/CDs chart.)	Release date: July 25, 2000; Label: Lyric Street Records; Formats: CD, cassette	5	53	US: Gold
Stars & Stripes	Release date: September 10, 2002; Label: Lyric Street Records; Formats: CD	10	62	
In Overdrive	Release date: February 3, 2009; Label: Country Crossing; Formats: CD, music download	73	—	
All in the Same Boat (with Joe Diffie and Sammy Kershaw)	Release date: May 28, 2013; Label: Big Hit Records; Formats: CD, music download	70	—	
Aaron Tippin 25	Release date: March 2, 2015; Label: Nippit Records; Formats: CD, music download	—	—	
"—" denotes releases that did not chart

== Compilation albums ==
Title	Album details	Peak chart positions		
Title	Album details	US Country	US	US Indie
Greatest Hits... And Then Some	Release date: March 25, 1997; Label: RCA Nashville; Formats: CD, cassette	17	97	—
Super Hits	Release date: March 24, 1998; Label: RCA Nashville; Formats: CD, cassette	72	—	—
Ultimate Aaron Tippin	Release date: February 10, 2004; Label: RCA Nashville; Formats: CD, music download	—	—	—
Now & Then	Release date: April 24, 2007; Label: Nippit/Rust Nashville; Formats: CD, music download	34	162	10
He Believed	Release date: May 6, 2008; Label: Cracker Barrel; Formats: CD	—	—	—
"—" denotes releases that did not chart

== Holiday albums ==
Title	Album details	Peak positions
Title	Album details	US Country
A December to Remember	Release date: September 18, 2001; Label: Lyric Street Records; Formats: CD, cassette	42

== Singles ==
=== 1990s ===
Year	Single	Peak chart positions			Album
Year	Single	US Country	US	CAN Country	Album
1990	"You've Got to Stand for Something"	6	—	13	You've Got to Stand for Something
1991	"I Wonder How Far It Is Over You"	40	—	14	You've Got to Stand for Something
1991	"She Made a Memory Out of Me"	54	—	56	You've Got to Stand for Something
1992	"There Ain't Nothin' Wrong with the Radio"	1	—	1	Read Between the Lines
1992	"I Wouldn't Have It Any Other Way"	5	—	4	Read Between the Lines
1992	"I Was Born with a Broken Heart"	38	—	63	Read Between the Lines
1993	"My Blue Angel"	7	—	16	Read Between the Lines
1993	"Workin' Man's Ph.D."	7	—	6	Call of the Wild
1993	"The Call of the Wild"	17	—	25	Call of the Wild
1994	"Honky Tonk Superman"	47	—	48	Call of the Wild
1994	"Whole Lotta Love on the Line"	30	—	27	Call of the Wild
1994	"I Got It Honest"	15	—	9	Lookin' Back at Myself
1995	"She Feels Like a Brand New Man Tonight"	39	—	34	Lookin' Back at Myself
1995	"That's as Close as I'll Get to Loving You"	1	— (Note: "That's as Close as I'll Get to Loving You" did not enter the Hot 100, but peaked at number one on Bubbling Under Hot 100 Singles, which acts as a 25-song extension of the Hot 100.)	10	Tool Box
1996	"Without Your Love"	22	—	33	Tool Box
1996	"Everything I Own"	51	—	31	Tool Box
1996	"How's the Radio Know"	69	—	—	Tool Box
1997	"That's What Happens When I Hold You"	50	—	86	Greatest Hits... And Then Some
1997	"A Door"	65	—	89	Greatest Hits... And Then Some
1998	"For You I Will"	6	49	27	What This Country Needs
1999	"I'm Leaving"	17	87	37	What This Country Needs
1999	"Her"	33	—	66	What This Country Needs
1999	"What This Country Needs"	47	—	—	What This Country Needs
"—" denotes releases that did not chart

=== 2000s - 2020s ===
Year	Single	Peak chart positions		Album
Year	Single	US Country	US	Album
2000	"Kiss This" (Note: "Kiss This" also peaked at number three on the RPM Country Tracks chart in Canada.)	1	42	People Like Us
2001	"People Like Us"	17	— (Note: "People Like Us" did not enter the Hot 100, but peaked at number seven on Bubbling Under Hot 100 Singles, which acts as a 25-song extension of the Hot 100.)	People Like Us
2001	"Always Was"	40	—	People Like Us
2001	"Where the Stars and Stripes and the Eagle Fly"	2	20	Stars & Stripes
2002	"I'll Take Love Over Money"	46	—	Stars & Stripes
2002	"If Her Lovin' Don't Kill Me"	40	—	Stars & Stripes
2002	"Love Like There's No Tomorrow" (with Thea Tippin)	35	—	Stars & Stripes
2005	"Come Friday"	42	—	I Believed
2006	"Ready to Rock (In a Country Kind of Way)"	—	—	Now & Then
2006	"He Believed"	55	—	Now & Then
2008	"Drill Here, Drill Now"	—	—	In Overdrive
2009	"East Bound and Down"	—	—	In Overdrive
2013	"All in the Same Boat" (with Sammy Kershaw and Joe Diffie)	—	—	All in the Same Boat
2026	"American Sky"			TBA
"—" denotes releases that did not chart

== Other charted songs ==
Year	Single	Peak positions	Album
Year	Single	US Country	Album
2002	"Jingle Bell Rock"	52	A December to Remember

== Videography ==
=== Music videos ===
Year	Title	Director
1991	"You've Got to Stand for Something"	Bing Sokolsky
1991	"I Wonder How Far It Is Over You"	Kort Falkenberg III
1991	"She Made a Memory Out of Me"	Bing Sokolsky
1992	"There Ain't Nothin' Wrong with the Radio"	John Lloyd Miller
1992	"I Wouldn't Have It Any Other Way"	Marius Penczner
1993	"My Blue Angel"	Jon Small
1993	"Working Man's Ph.D"	Jon Small
1994	"The Call of the Wild"	Jon Small
1994	"Honky Tonk Superman"	Jon Small
1994	"I Got It Honest"	Charley Randazzo
1995	"She Feels Like a Brand New Man Tonight"	Steven T. Miller/R. Brad Murano
1995	"That's as Close as I'll Get to Loving You"	Michael Salomon
1997	"Fire Down Below" (with Mark Collie and Jeff Wood)	Steven R. Monroe
1998	"For You I Will"	Steven R. Monroe
2000	"Kiss This"	Trey Fanjoy
2000	"People Like Us"	Trey Fanjoy
2001	"Where the Stars and Stripes and the Eagle Fly"	Trey Fanjoy
2003	"Love Like There's No Tomorrow" (with Thea Tippin)	—N/a
2006	"Ready to Rock (In a Country Kind of Way)"	Bob E. Karate
2007	"He Believed"	Wes Edwards
2013	"All in the Same Boat" (with Sammy Kershaw and Joe Diffie)	—N/a
2026	"American Sky"	Ryan Nolan
