= Greatest Hits... And Then Some =

Greatest Hits… and Then Some

Greatest hits album by Aaron Tippin
- Released: March 25, 1997
- Recorded: 1990–1997
- Genre: Country
- Length: 44:59
- Label: RCA Nashville
- Producer: Various original producers Compilation and new tracks produced by Steve Gibson

Aaron Tippin chronology
Tool Box (1995)	Greatest Hits… and Then Some (1997)	What This Country Needs (1998)

Professional ratings
Review scores
Source	Rating
AllMusic	link

Greatest Hits… and Then Some is the first compilation album by American country music artist Aaron Tippin. Released on RCA Nashville in 1997, it is composed of nine tracks from his first five studio albums, as well as four newly recorded tracks: "Cold Gray Kentucky Morning", "A Door", "That's What Happens When I Hold You" and "If Only Your Eyes Could Lie". Of these, "That's What Happens When I Hold You" and "A Door" were released as singles, respectively reaching Nos. 50 and 65 on the Billboard Hot Country Singles & Tracks chart. After this album's release, Tippin exited RCA Nashville's roster, and signed in 1998 to Lyric Street Records.

== Track listing ==
No.	Title	Writer(s)	Original album	Length
1.	"Cold Gray Kentucky Morning"	Tim Krekel	New song	3:40
2.	"You've Got to Stand for Something"	Aaron Tippin, Buddy Brock	You've Got to Stand for Something (1991)	3:04
3.	"There Ain't Nothin' Wrong with the Radio"	Tippin, Brock	Read Between the Lines (1992)	2:46
4.	"I Wouldn't Have It Any Other Way"	Tippin, Butch Curry	Read Between the Lines	3:11
5.	"A Door"	Mark D. Sanders, Tim Nichols	New song	3:10
6.	"My Blue Angel"	Tippin, Kim Williams, Philip Douglas	Read Between the Lines	3:24
7.	"Workin' Man's Ph.D."	Tippin, Douglas, Bobby Boyd	Call of the Wild (1993)	3:29
8.	"The Call of the Wild"	Tippin, Brock, Michael P. Heeney	Call of the Wild	4:30
9.	"That's What Happens When I Hold You"	Angela Kaset, Johnny Cymbal	New song	3:42
10.	"Whole Lotta Love on the Line"	Tippin, Donny Kees	Call of the Wild	3:43
11.	"I Got It Honest"	Tippin, Bruce Burch, Marcus Franklin Johnson	Lookin' Back at Myself (1994)	3:45
12.	"That's as Close as I'll Get to Loving You"	Sally Dworsky, Paul Jefferson, Jan Leyers	Tool Box (1995)	3:16
13.	"If Only Your Eyes Could Lie"	Bob McDill, John Jarrard	New song	3:19
Total length:				44:59

== Personnel ==
The following musicians played on the newly recorded tracks.

- Pat Coil – keyboards
- Stuart Duncan – fiddle
- Paul Franklin – steel guitar
- Steve Gibson – acoustic guitar, electric guitar
- John Hobbs – keyboards
- Brent Mason – electric guitar
- Judy Rodman – background vocals
- John Wesley Ryles – background vocals
- Aaron Tippin- lead vocals
- Biff Watson – acoustic guitar
- Dennis Wilson – background vocals
- Lonnie Wilson – drums
- Glenn Worf – bass guitar

== Chart performance ==
Chart (1997)	Peak position
U.S. Billboard Top Country Albums	17
U.S. Billboard 200	97
