= Stars & Stripes (2002 album) =

Studio album by Aaron Tippin
- Released: September 10, 2002
- Recorded: 2001–2002
- Genre: Country
- Length: 38:54
- Label: Lyric Street
- Producer: Mike Bradley; Aaron Tippin; Biff Watson

Aaron Tippin chronology
| A December to Remember (2001) | Stars & Stripes (2002) | In Overdrive (2009) |

Singles from Stars & Stripes
- 1. "Where the Stars and Stripes and the Eagle Fly" Released: September 17, 2001; 2. "If Her Lovin' Don't Kill Me" Released: August 10, 2002; 3. "Love Like There's No Tomorrow" Released: December 21, 2002

Professional ratings
Review scores
| Source | Rating |
|---|---|
| Allmusic | 4/5 stars |

Stars & Stripes is the ninth studio album by American country music artist Aaron Tippin, released on September 10, 2002. It features the singles "Where the Stars and Stripes and the Eagle Fly", "Love Like There's No Tomorrow" (a duet with his wife, Thea) and "I'll Take Love over Money". "Where the Stars and Stripes and the Eagle Fly" was Tippin's biggest all-genre hit, peaking at #2 on the country charts and #20 on the Billboard Hot 100. "If Her Lovin' Don't Kill Me" was later recorded by John Anderson on his 2007 album Easy Money, from which it was also released as a single.

== Track listing ==
Stars & Stripes track listing
| No. | Title | Writer(s) | Length |
|---|---|---|---|
| 1. | "Where the Stars and Stripes and the Eagle Fly" | Aaron Tippin; Casey Beathard; Kenny Beard | 3:48 |
| 2. | "I'll Take Love over Money" | Bob DiPiero; Tony Mullins | 3:35 |
| 3. | "I Believed" | Jeffrey Steele | 4:13 |
| 4. | "Honky Tonk If You Love Country" | DiPiero; Ed Hill; Mark D. Sanders | 3:19 |
| 5. | "If Her Lovin' Don't Kill Me" | Vicky McGehee; John Rich; Tim Womack | 3:04 |
| 6. | "Love Like There's No Tomorrow" (featuring Thea Tippin) | A. Tippin; Thea Tippin | 3:43 |
| 7. | "At the End of the Day" | A. Tippin; Michael P. Heeney | 3:19 |
| 8. | "We Can't Get Any Higher Than This" | Ray Herndon; Steele | 2:38 |
| 9. | "Five Gallon Tear" | Dennis Linde | 4:29 |
| 10. | "This Old Couch" | A. Tippin; Randy Scruggs | 3:28 |
| 11. | "Love Me Back" | A. Tippin; T. Tippin; Glenn E. Ashworth; Dana Sigmon | 3:25 |
| Total length: | | | 38:54 |

== Personnel ==
- Bruce Bouton - pedal steel guitar, Weissenborn
- Mark Capps - cymbals, tom-tom
- J.T. Corenflos - baritone guitar, electric guitar
- Melodie Crittenden - background vocals
- Paul Franklin - lap steel guitar, pedal steel guitar
- Kenny Greenberg - electric guitar
- Aubrey Haynie - fiddle, mandolin
- Wes Hightower - background vocals
- John Barlow Jarvis - piano
- Brent Mason - electric guitar, piano
- Steve Nathan - keyboards, Hammond organ, piano, Wurlitzer
- John Wesley Ryles - background vocals
- Neil Thrasher - background vocals
- Aaron Tippin - lead vocals
- Thea Tippin - duet vocals on "Love Like There's No Tomorrow"
- Biff Watson - bouzouki, cowbell, 12-string acoustic guitar, acoustic guitar, electric guitar, synthesizer guitar, Jews Harp, keyboards, drum loops, shaker, tambourine
- Dennis Wilson - background vocals
- Lonnie Wilson - drums, drum loops, tambourine
- Glenn Worf - bass guitar

== Chart performance ==
| Chart (2002) | Peak position |
|---|---|
| U.S. Billboard Top Country Albums | 10 |
| U.S. Billboard 200 | 62 |
