= People Like Us =

People Like Us may refer to:

== Film and TV ==
- People Like Us (2012 film), a drama film starring Chris Pine, Elizabeth Banks, Olivia Wilde, Jon Favreau and Michelle Pfeiffer
  - People Like Us (soundtrack), by A.R. Rahman
- People Like Us (1980 film), an Australian film
- People Like Us (mockumentary), a British radio and TV comedy series that ran 1995–2001
- People Like Us (TV series), 2013 British reality series
- "People Like Us" (Fear the Walking Dead), a television episode
- People Like Us, a 1990 miniseries on NBC that earned a Primetime Emmy Award for Eva Marie Saint

== Music ==
- People Like Us (musician) or Vicki Bennett (born 1967), British multimedia artist
- People Like Us (Aaron Tippin album), 2000
  - "People Like Us" (Aaron Tippin song), 2000
- People Like Us (The Mamas & the Papas album), 1971
- "People Like Us" (Kelly Clarkson song), 2012
- "People Like Us", by Talking Heads from the 1986 album True Stories

== Other uses ==
- People Like Us (book), a 2007 book by Waleed Aly
- People Like Us (Singapore), a gay equality lobby group in Singapore
