= Tool Box (Aaron Tippin album) =

Studio album by Aaron Tippin
- Released: November 21, 1995
- Recorded: 1995
- Studio: Woodland (Nashville, Tennessee); Sound Emporium (Nashville, Tennessee)
- Genre: Country
- Length: 35:13
- Label: RCA Nashville
- Producer: Steve Gibson

Aaron Tippin chronology
Lookin' Back at Myself (1994)	Tool Box (1995)	Greatest Hits... And Then Some (1997)

Professional ratings
Review scores
Source	Rating
AllMusic	3/5 stars

Tool Box is the fifth studio album by American country music artist Aaron Tippin. It features the singles "That's as Close as I'll Get to Loving You", "Without Your Love", "Everything I Own" and "How's the Radio Know". "That's as Close as I'll Get to Loving You" reached Number One on the Billboard country charts in 1995, giving Tippin the second Number One of his career, and his first since “There Ain’t Nothin’ Wrong with the Radio” in 1992. "Without Your Love" reached #22, and the other two singles both missed Top 40 in the U.S. The album was certified gold by the RIAA. The album was recorded at Woodland Sound Studios' Studio A and Sound Emporium Studios' Studio A, both in Nashville, Tennessee.

"You've Always Got Me" was previously recorded by Pearl River on their 1994 album Pearl River, and "Ten Pound Hammer" would later be recorded by Barbara Mandrell on her 1997 album It Works for Me. Additionally, "I Can Help" is a cover of a song originally released by country-pop artist Billy Swan in 1973. "Country Boy's Tool Box" is also reprised from Tippin's 1994 album Lookin' Back at Myself.

== Track listing ==
Tool Box track listing
No.	Title	Writer(s)	Length
1.	"Ten Pound Hammer"	Dennis Linde	3:02
2.	"That's as Close as I'll Get to Loving You"	Sally Dworsky; Paul Jefferson; Jan Leyers	3:16
3.	"A Real Nice Problem to Have"	Rick Bowles; Tom Shapiro	3:15
4.	"Without Your Love"	Al Anderson; Craig Wiseman	3:29
5.	"How's the Radio Know"	Michael P. Heeney; Aaron Tippin	3:09
6.	"Everything I Own"	Tony Martin; Reese Wilson	3:32
7.	"I Can Help"	Billy Swan	3:23
8.	"You Gotta Start Somewhere"	Bob Regan; Shapiro	3:02
9.	"She Made a Man Out of a Mountain of Stone"	Terry M. Brown; Tippin	2:50
10.	"You've Always Got Me"	Walt Aldridge; Brad Crisler	3:03
11.	"Country Boy's Tool Box"	Ronnie Rogers; Tippin	3:03
Total length:			35:13

== Personnel ==
As listed in liner notes.

- Stuart Duncan - fiddle
- Sonny Garrish - pedal steel guitar
- Steve Gibson - acoustic guitar, electric guitar
- Rob Hajacos - fiddle
- Ray Herndon - background vocals
- John Hobbs - keyboards
- Mitch Humphries - keyboards
- Brent Mason - electric guitar
- Bobby Ogdin - keyboards
- Michael Rhodes - bass guitar
- John Wesley Ryles - background vocals
- Hank Singer - fiddle
- Aaron Tippin - lead vocals
- Billy Joe Walker Jr. - acoustic guitar
- Biff Watson - acoustic guitar
- Dennis Wilson - background vocals
- Lonnie Wilson - drums
- Glenn Worf - bass guitar
- Reggie Young - electric guitar

== Chart performance ==
Chart (1995)	Peak position
U.S. Billboard Top Country Albums	12
U.S. Billboard 200	63
