= Carolina (Eric Church album) =

Studio album by Eric Church
- Released: March 24, 2009
- Recorded: 2008–09
- Genres: Country; outlaw country; Southern rock
- Length: 43:21
- Label: Capitol Nashville
- Producer: Jay Joyce

Eric Church chronology
Sinners Like Me (2006)	Carolina (2009)	Chief (2011)

Singles from Carolina
- 1. "Love Your Love the Most" Released: February 9, 2009; 2. "Hell on the Heart" Released: October 12, 2009; 3. "Smoke a Little Smoke" Released: June 21, 2010

Carolina is the second studio album by American country music artist Eric Church. It was released on March 24, 2009 via Capitol Records Nashville. "Love Your Love the Most", the album's lead-off single, became Church's first Top 10 hit on the Billboard Hot Country Songs chart. This song follows the non-album single "His Kind of Money (My Kind of Love)", which peaked outside the top 40 in mid-2008. As of November 29, 2013, the album has sold 715,000 copies in the US, and it has been certified Platinum by the Recording Industry Association of America (RIAA) in 2016.

== Singles ==
=== "Love Your Love the Most" ===
"Love Your Love the Most" was released as the album's lead-off single. It entered the top 40 on the Hot Country Songs in April 2009, becoming his first top 40 hit since "Guys Like Me" in early 2007, as well as his first top ten country hit peaking at No. 10 in October 2009.

=== "Hell on the Heart" ===
"Hell on the Heart" was released as the second single in October, and entered the top 40 in November.

=== "Smoke a Little Smoke" ===
"Smoke a Little Smoke" was released as the album's third single in June 2010.

== Critical reception ==
Professional ratings
Aggregate scores
Source	Rating
Metacritic	76/100
Review scores
Source	Rating
AllMusic	3.5/5 stars
The 9513	3.5/5 stars
Slant Magazine	2/5 stars

Upon its release, Carolina received generally positive reviews from most music critics. At Metacritic, which assigns a normalized rating out of 100 to reviews from mainstream critics, the album received an average score of 76, based on 4 reviews, which indicates "generally favorable reviews".

Stephen Thomas Erlewine reviewed the album for AllMusic and gave it three-and-a-half stars out of five. He said that "Church sings like a manicured model, striking all the poses and hitting all the notes, but missing that essential grit. Of course, he isn't helped out by the production of his second album Carolina, a recording that gleams pristine, designed for two drinks at an after-work smokeless bar, not a long booze-filled night at a honky tonk dive. It's a commercial sound, one that puts Carolina firmly within the mainstream, and it also fits the contours of Church's voice."

Jonathan Keefe of Slant Magazine was less favorable, calling it "a strident stab at the mainstream commercial acceptance that has thus far eluded the singer-songwriter." He cited the production of "Smoke a Little Smoke" and "Longer Gone" for "that actually reinforc[ing] the tones of those songs," giving the album two stars out of five.

== Commercial performance ==
As of November 2013 the album has sold 715,000 copies. The album was certified Platinum by the RIAA for combined sales and streams of one million units on August 31, 2016.

== Track listing ==
All tracks are written by Eric Church, with additional co-writers as noted.

No.	Title	Writer(s)	Length
1.	"Ain't Killed Me Yet"	Deric Ruttan	3:22
2.	"Lotta Boot Left to Fill"	Jeremy Spillman	3:24
3.	"Young and Wild"	Spillman	3:15
4.	"Where She Told Me to Go"	Casey Beathard	4:48
5.	"Longer Gone"	Stephanie Chapman	3:08
6.	"Love Your Love the Most"	Michael P. Heeney	2:50
7.	"Smoke a Little Smoke"	Jeff Hyde; Driver Williams	3:11
8.	"Without You Here"	Brandon Church; Spillman	2:42
9.	"You Make It Look So Easy"		4:15
10.	"Carolina"		4:39
11.	"Hell on the Heart"	Ruttan; Spillman	2:44
12.	"Those I've Loved"	Brett Beavers	5:03
13.	"My Heart's Got a Memory" (bonus track)	Chapman	2:52
14.	"Faster Than My Angels Can Fly" (bonus track)	Heeney	3:49
15.	"His Kind of Money (My Kind of Love)" (bonus track)	Beathard; Shane Minor	3:42
Total length:			46:57

== Personnel ==
Credits adapted from the Carolina liner notes.

Musicians

- Bruce Bouton – dobro, pedal steel guitar
- Luke Bulla – fiddle
- Mark Casstevens – banjo, acoustic guitar
- Nathan Chapman – acoustic guitar, background vocals
- Stephanie Chapman – background vocals
- Eric Church – acoustic guitar, electric guitar, lead vocals
- J. T. Corenflos – electric guitar
- Steve Fishell – dobro, pedal steel guitar
- Lee Hendricks – bass guitar
- Jedd Hughes – acoustic guitar, mandolin
- Jeff Hyde – acoustic guitar
- Jay Joyce – drum programming, Fender Rhodes, electric guitar, Hammond B-3 organ

- Gary Morse – dobro, pedal steel guitar
- Russ Pahl – dobro, pedal steel guitar
- Mike Severs – acoustic guitar
- Ed Smoak – electric guitar
- Bryan Sutton – banjo, acoustic guitar, mandolin
- Russell Terrell – background vocals
- Ilya Toshinsky – banjo, acoustic guitar
- Kenny Vaughan – electric guitar
- Driver Williams – electric guitar
- Craig Wright – drums, percussion
- Jonathan Yudkin – fiddle

Production

- Jay Joyce – producer
- Reid Shippen – mixing (Soundstage Studios)
- Andrew Mendelson – mastering (Georgetown Masters)
- Scott Johnson – production assistance

Imagery

- Joanna Carter – creative direction
- Wendy Stamberger – art direction and design
- Jim Wright – photography
- Lee Moore – wardrobe
- Debra Williams – grooming
- Michelle Hall – art production
- Jill Lamothe – art production

== Charts ==
=== Weekly charts ===
Chart (2009)	Peak position
US Billboard 200	17
US Top Country Albums (Billboard)	4

=== Year-end charts ===
Chart (2009)	Position
US Top Country Albums (Billboard)	41
Chart (2010)	Position
US Top Country Albums (Billboard)	44
Chart (2011)	Position
US Top Country Albums (Billboard)	41

== Certifications ==
Region	Certification	Certified units/sales
United States (RIAA)	Platinum	715,000
