= Rust Records =

Rust Records may refer to:

- Rust Records, NY, a 1950s sublabel of Laurie Records
- Rust Nashville Records, a former recording company founded in Cleveland, later moved to Nashville, Tennessee (1998-2007)
- Rust Records (Pittsburgh), a Pittsburgh-based record label, see Filth (band)
