= I Was Born with a Broken Heart =

Single by Aaron Tippin

from the album Read Between the Lines
- B-side: "Read Between the Lines"
- Released: October 24, 1992
- Genre: Country
- Length: 2:39
- Label: RCA Nashville
- Songwriters: Aaron Tippin, Jim McBride
- Producer: Emory Gordy Jr.

Aaron Tippin singles chronology
"I Wouldn't Have It Any Other Way" (1992)	"I Was Born with a Broken Heart" (1992)	"My Blue Angel" (1993)

"I Was Born with a Broken Heart" is a song co-written and recorded by American country music artist Aaron Tippin. It was released in October 1992 as the third single from the album Read Between the Lines. The song reached NO. 38 on the Billboard Hot Country Singles & Tracks chart. The song was written by Tippin and Jim McBride.

Before Tippin's version, Josh Logan had recorded the song for his 1988 album Somebody Paints the Wall. David Ball also recorded a version for his 1989 self-titled album.

== Chart performance ==
Chart (1992)	Peak position
US Hot Country Songs (Billboard)	38
Canadian RPM Country Tracks	63
