= For You I Will =

For You I Will may refer to:

- "For You I Will" (Aaron Tippin song)
- "For You I Will" (Monica song)
- "For You I Will (Confidence)", a song by Teddy Geiger
