= Kiss This (Aaron Tippin song) =

2000 single by Aaron Tippin

- Label of the 7" promotional single

Single by Aaron Tippin

from the album People Like Us
- B-side: "People Like Us"
- Released: May 22, 2000
- Recorded: 2000
- Genre: Country
- Length: 2:53
- Label: Lyric Street
- Songwriters: Aaron Tippin, Thea Tippin, Phillip Douglas
- Producers: Aaron Tippin, Biff Watson, Mike Bradley

Aaron Tippin singles chronology
| "What This Country Needs" (1999) | "Kiss This" (2000) | "People Like Us" (2000) |

"Kiss This" is a song co-written and recorded by American country music artist Aaron Tippin. It was released in May 2000 as the first single from his album People Like Us. The song, written by Tippin with his wife, Thea, and Phillip Douglas, became his third and final Number One on the Billboard country charts, five years after his last Number One, "That's as Close as I'll Get to Loving You" in 1995, as well as the first Number One for the Lyric Street Records label, the label that Tippin was signed to at the time.

== Content ==
The song's protagonist is a woman who found out her former lover has been cheating on her, and getting revenge on him being told from the point of view of a bartender who witnesses the ordeal. It is in a 4/4 time signature and the key of B major, with an approximate tempo of 116 beats per minute. Tippin's vocal ranges two octaves, from F♯_{3} to F♯_{5}. It features backing vocals from Melodie Crittenden, Kim Parent, and Joanna Janét. Tippin's wife, Thea, with whom he wrote the song, can be heard saying "See ya!" at the end.

== Music video ==
The music video was directed by Trey Fanjoy, and premiered on CMT on May 26, 2000, where CMT named it a "Hot Shot".

== Chart performance ==
The song debuted at number 70 on the Hot Country Singles & Tracks chart dated May 27, 2000. It charted for 33 weeks on that chart, and reached number-one on the chart dated October 14, 2000, remaining at the top for two weeks, and becoming Tippin's third and final number-one single, and his first since “That’s as Close as I’ll Get to Loving You” in 1995. It also peaked at number 42 on the Billboard Hot 100.

| Chart (2000) | Peak position |
|---|---|
| Canada Country Singles (RPM) | 3 |
| US Billboard Hot 100 | 42 |
| US Hot Country Songs (Billboard) | 1 |

=== Year-end charts ===
| Chart (2000) | Position |
|---|---|
| US Country Songs (Billboard) | 25 |
