= David Ball (album) =

Studio album by David Ball
- Released: December 1989 (original release); June 1994 (reissue)
- Recorded: 1989
- Genre: Honky-tonk
- Length: 36:03
- Label: RCA Nashville
- Producer: Billy Williams, Bill Halverson

David Ball chronology
David Ball (1989)	Thinkin' Problem (1994)

Singles from David Ball
- 1. "Gift of Love" Released: August 1989

Professional ratings
Review scores
Source	Rating
Allmusic	3/5 stars

David Ball is the debut album from American country music artist David Ball. He recorded the album in 1989 for RCA Nashville. Three singles from it charted between 1988 and 1989: "Steppin' Out", "You Go, You're Gone" and "Gift of Love", which respectively reached numbers 46, 55, and 64 on the Billboard country charts. Despite these three singles, however, the album was not released by RCA until late 1994, by which point Ball had been signed to Warner Bros. Records for the release of his breakthrough album Thinkin' Problem. The album was originally titled "Steppin' Out" on its original release schedule in 1989.

The track "I Was Born with a Broken Heart" was previously a number 75 single in 1989 for Josh Logan from his album Somebody Paints the Wall, and would later be a number 38 single for Aaron Tippin from his 1992 album Read Between the Lines. In addition, Ball re-recorded "Texas Echo" for his 2001 album Amigo.

== Track listing ==
1. "Gift of Love" (David Ball, Frank Dycus) – 3:23
2. "If She Were Mine" (Buddy Cannon, Pamela Brown Hayes) – 3:48
3. "Message in a Bottle" (Ball, Walter Hyatt) – 4:00
4. "All Over Me" (Tracy Parker, Jimmy Wooten) – 3:28
5. "Listen to My Heart" (Ball, Allen Shamblin) – 3:01
6. "No More Tears" (Buddy Blackman, Vip Vipperman, Ted Hewitt) – 3:17
7. "Texas Echo" (Ball) – 3:13
8. "Waitin' for Somebody New" (Don Schlitz, Roger Brown) – 3:05
9. "We're Steppin' Out Tonight" (Billy Wallace) – 2:40
10. "I Was Born with a Broken Heart" (Jim McBride, Aaron Tippin) – 3:05
11. "Smokin' Cigarettes and Drinkin' Coffee Blues" (Marty Robbins) – 3:03
