= I'm Leaving (Aaron Tippin song) =

Single by Aaron Tippin

from the album What This Country Needs
- Released: January 30, 1999
- Genre: Country
- Length: 3:21
- Label: Lyric Street
- Songwriters: Aaron Barker, Ron Harbin, L. David Lewis
- Producers: Pat McMakin, Aaron Tippin

Aaron Tippin singles chronology
"For You I Will" (1998)	"I'm Leaving" (1999)	"Her" (1999)

"I'm Leaving" is a song written by Aaron Barker, Ron Harbin and L. David Lewis, and recorded by American country music artist Aaron Tippin. It was released in January 1999 as the second single from the album What This Country Needs. The song reached number 17 on the Billboard Hot Country Singles & Tracks chart and number 87 on the Billboard 100. It also reached number 37 on the Canadian Country chart.

== Chart performance ==
Chart (1999)	Peak position
Canada Country Singles (RPM)	37
US Billboard Hot 100	87
US Hot Country Songs (Billboard)	17
