= The Hillbilly Way =

American country music band

- Also known as: Povertyneck Hillbillies
- Origin: Pittsburgh, Pennsylvania, United States
- Genres: Country
- Years active: 2012
- Labels: Cort, Rust, Rhythm House Studios, Pennington Entertainment
- Members: Chris "Abby" Abbondanza; David "Junior" Guthrie; Jeff Volek; Keith Kleinhampl
- Past members: Dave Cramer; John Parrendo; Ryan Lucotch; Bob "Crafty" Crafton; Dan Glaser

The Hillbilly Way or THW are an American country music band formed in and around Pittsburgh, Pennsylvania in 2012 and originally consisted of Chris "Abby" Abbondanza (lead vocals), Dave Cramer (keyboards), Ryan Lucotch (drums), Jeff Volek (bass guitar, accordion), David "Junior" Guthrie (electric guitar), and Bob "Crafty" Crafton (steel guitar). The band originally started as a Reunion to their previous band name The Povertyneck Hillbillies.

Under their previous name, The Povertyneck Hillbillies, they released a total of three albums: the independently released Hillbilly State of Mind and Don't Look Back in 2002 and 2004, followed by a self-titled effort in 2006 on Rust Records, Universal Music Group. Although these three albums produced no chart hits, they sold more than 10,000 copies nationwide and their video for the song "Mr. Right Now", went to #2 on Great American Country, GAC, for 15 weeks. The group toured all over the continental US during this time under "The Dale Morris & Associates", now called Paradigm Talent Agency and were marketed by AristoMedia. They also attended the CMA Awards and were featured in magazines such as Country Weekly and Rolling Stone. In 2008, Chris Higbee, the founder of "The Povertyneck Hillbillies", issued a press release indicating that the band would be on hiatus indefinitely. Higbee then went on with his own band called "The Chris Higbee Project", while Abbondanza began a solo career, and "Junior", Ryan, and Jeff formed a band called "The West Virginia Push", A.K.A. "Junior & The Push".

In 2012, the band reformed under the name of The Hillbilly Way, and had a kickoff concert August 25, 2012, at CONSOL Energy Park, home of the Washington Wild Things minor league baseball team, in Washington County, Pennsylvania. The band now consists of Chris "Abby" Abbondanza, Jeff Volek, David "Junior" Guthrie, and Keith Kleinhampl.

== Biography ==
The Povertyneck Hillbillies were founded in 2000 in the borough of Dawson, Pennsylvania by fiddler Chris Higbee. After multiple band members he met future lead vocalist Chris "Abby" Abbondanza, they met and befriended each other after discovering common musical interests. Through the help of other friends, the two musicians found five more members who would complete the band's lineup: guitarist David Guthrie, keyboardist Dave Cramer, bass guitarist Jeff Volek, steel guitarist Bob Crafton and drummer Ryan Lucotch. The seven-piece band then assumed the name The Povertyneck Hillbillies. Povertyneck was a name derived from a small area near Dawson, PA known to locals, near Higbee's grandfather's farm.

In the 2000s, the band began touring throughout Pennsylvania, playing at various bars and clubs to help develop a fanbase. Eventually, they were discovered by members of the Pittsburgh Steelers, a franchise of the National Football League, who chose the band to play "The Star-Spangled Banner" at a halftime show for the team. Eventually, the Povertyneck Hillbillies were chosen as the Steelers' official band.

By 2002, the band had released its debut album, Hillbilly State of Mind; a second album, Don't Look Back, followed two years later on Cort Records. Although neither album produced any chart singles, the albums sold more than 10,000 copies nationwide; as a result, they were named by the Country Music Association as one of the top-selling independent country acts of 2005. Crafton was forced out of the group by Rust Records in 2006, allowing them to be signed to Rust Records and released their self-titled third album. This album produced non-charting singles in "Mr. Right Now" and "One Night in New Orleans", the latter of which was previously recorded by Blackhawk. The Povertyneck Hillbillies left Rust in 2007.

On January 14, 2008, Higbee announced that the band had "decided to take a break of indefinite length." According to his press release, "Abby, Jeff, Junior and Dave have chosen to stop performing with the band.

== Reunion ==
On April 9, 2012, it was announced by Chris "Abby" Abbondanza, on WOGI Froggy Radio, that The Povertyneck Hillbillies would be hosting a reunion concert on August 25, 2012. The concert was held at CONSOL Energy Park, in Washington, Pennsylvania. The line up consists of all of the previous members, with the exception of Chris Higbee, who was replaced by guest fiddle player John Parrendo, who later joined the band. Abbondanza stated that numerous requests to Higbee to join the show have been declined as the relationship has been changed indefinitely . The band is now known as THW which is short for The Hillbilly Way, which was one of the songs they performed while they were with The Povertyneck Hillbillies. The band then released a self-titled 4 song EP on the night of the concert, containing the single "My Kinda Sunday Drive", that is part of the 4 song EP. "My Kind of Sunday Drive" has received moderate airplay in the local Pittsburgh country music market, mostly on WOGI, known as "Froggy Radio", on frequencies 94.9 and 104.3. The band also released a second single from that EP, "Fear of Greyhounds", later that year.

== Present ==
In May 2014, it was announced that Dave Cramer (Keyboard) and John Parrendo (Fiddle) had quit the band. Dave stated on his personal Facebook page that he chose to leave the band due to wanting to spend more time with his family. Bob "Crafty" Crafton and Ryan Lucotch also left the band in 2015.

THW has re-organized since then, and now consists of Chris "Abby" Abbondanza on lead vocals and acoustic guitar, Jeff Volek on bass guitar and backing vocals, David "Junior" Guthrie on lead guitars and backing vocals and Keith Kleinhampl on Drums, percussion and percussion programming. During 2016 to 2018, THW was signed to the Pennington Entertainment management group out of Nashville, TN. Under Pennington, they recorded the singles Best Night of Our Lives, and Damn I Just Wanna Kiss You. They made a video for Best Night of Our Lives, which was directed by Ford Fairchild. Damn I Just Wanna Kiss You was released in 2018 and went as high as #42 on the Music Row charts. THW has just released the single "Lonely Girl" for 2019. Their music can be found on all music streaming sites.

== Discography ==
=== Albums ===
Title	Album details	Peak chart positions				
Title	Album details	US Country	US	US Indie	US Heat	
Hillbilly State of Mind	Release date: 2002; Label: self-released	—	—	—	—	
Don't Look Back	Release date: June 28, 2005; Label: Cort Records	—	—	—	—	
Povertyneck Hillbillies	Release date: June 6, 2006; Label: Rust Nashville	31	159	15	7	
The Hillbilly Way	Release date: 2012; Label: Rhythm House Studios	_	_	_	_	
Just Go With It	Release date: 2015; Label: Rhythm House Studios	-	-	-	-	
Best Night Of Our Lives	Release date: 2017; Label: Pennington Entertainment	-	-	-	-	
Damn I Just Wanna Kiss You	Release date: 2018; Label: Pennington Entertainment	42	-	26	-	"—" denotes releases that did not chart

=== Singles ===
Year	Single	Album
2006	"The Hillbilly Way"	Povertyneck Hillbillies
2006	"Mr. Right Now"	Povertyneck Hillbillies
2006	"One Night in New Orleans"	Povertyneck Hillbillies
2012	"Fear of Greyhounds"	The Hillbilly Way
2012	"Slow Things Down for A Change"	The Hillbilly Way
2012	"This Ain't Your Mama's Country"	The Hillbilly Way
2012	"My Kinda Sunday Drive"	The Hillbilly Way
2015	"Country Honey"	Just Go With It
2015	"Pittsburgh, PA"	Just Go With It
2015	"More Beer"	Just Go With It
2015	"Just Go With It"	Just Go With It
2015	"Bad Hangover"	Just Go With It
2015	"That Ain't Gonna Fly"	Just Go With It
2015	"Hook It Up"	Just Go With It
2015	"Every Time It Rains"	Just Go With It
2015	"Tequila Memory"	Just Go With It
2015	"That's What I Like About A Honky Tonk"	Just Go With It
2017	"Best Night Of Our Lives"	Best Night Of Our Lives
2018	"Damn I Just Wanna Kiss You"	Damn I Just Wanna Kiss You
2019	"Lonely Girl"	Lonely Girl

=== Music videos ===
Year	Video	Director
2006	"Mr. Right Now"	Lark Watts
2016	"Best Night Of Our Lives"	
2017	"Damn I Just Wanna Kiss You"	Ford Fairchild
