= Love Your Love the Most =

Single by Eric Church

from the album Carolina
- Released: February 9, 2009
- Recorded: 2008
- Genre: Country
- Length: 2:50
- Label: Capitol Nashville
- Songwriters: Eric Church; Michael P. Heeney
- Producer: Jay Joyce

Eric Church singles chronology
"His Kind of Money (My Kind of Love)" (2008)	"Love Your Love the Most" (2009)	"Hell on the Heart" (2009)

Music video
- "Love Your Love the Most" at CMT.com

"Love Your Love the Most" is a song co-written and recorded by American country music artist Eric Church. It was released in February 2009 as the first single from his 2009 album Carolina. The song became his first Top 10 hit on the US Billboard Hot Country Songs chart with a peak at number 10. Church wrote this song with Michael P. Heeney.

== Content ==
"Love Your Love the Most" is a mid-tempo song in which the male narrator lists off various objects that he likes (e.g. "Yes, I love good cold beer / And mustard on my fries / I love a good loud honky-tonk / That rocks on Friday nights"). He then goes on to say that although he loves these, what he loves most is his female partner ("Honey, I love your love the most").

== Critical reception ==
Dan Milliken of Country Universe gave the song a D− grade, saying that the lyrics "[run] through a pointless list of completely unrelated things he likes or believes in[…]This time, though, the list is set up to show his woman that he appreciates her more than even the finest in material pleasures." He compared its theme to Tom T. Hall's Number One hit "I Love", but said that while that song "sounded knowingly silly", "Love Your Love the Most" had a more serious sound in contrast to its list approach. In 2017, Billboard contributor Chuck Dauphin put "Love Your Love the Most" at number nine on his top 10 list of Church's best songs.

== Music video ==
The music video, directed by Adam Hall, premiered on CMT on March 24, 2009. The video sees a man walking into a pawn shop attempting to sell a guitar and comes across a View-Master on the counter and begins looking through the reels. The reels feature Church performing the song and each slide shows him performing a different action. Upon completing the slideshow, the man feeling inspired by the song, decides to keep his guitar.

== Chart performance ==
"Love Your Love the Most" debuted at number 59 on the U.S. Billboard Hot Country Songs for the week of February 28, 2009.

Chart (2009)	Peak Position
Canada Country (Billboard)	23
US Hot Country Songs (Billboard)	10
US Billboard Hot 100	63

=== Year-end charts ===
Chart (2009)	Position
US Country Songs (Billboard)	39

== Certifications ==
Region	Certification	Certified units/sales
United States (RIAA)	2× Platinum	2,000,000^{‡}
^{‡} Sales+streaming figures based on certification alone.
