= Where the Stars and Stripes and the Eagle Fly =

Single by Aaron Tippin

from the album Stars & Stripes
- B-side: "You've Got to Stand for Something"
- Released: September 17, 2001
- Recorded: September 13, 2001
- Genre: Country
- Length: 3:48
- Label: Lyric Street
- Songwriters: Kenny Beard; Casey Beathard; Aaron Tippin
- Producers: Mike Bradley; Aaron Tippin; Biff Watson

Aaron Tippin singles chronology
"Always Was" (2001)	"Where the Stars and Stripes and the Eagle Fly" (2001)	"If Her Lovin' Don't Kill Me" (2002)

"Where the Stars and Stripes and the Eagle Fly" is a song written by Kenny Beard, Casey Beathard, and co-written and recorded by American country music singer Aaron Tippin. The song reached number 2 on the Billboard Hot Country Singles & Tracks chart for one week, held from the top spot by Alan Jackson's "Where Were You (When the World Stopped Turning)". In addition to this, 'Fly' also peaked at number 20 on the Billboard Hot 100, marking Tippin's first and, to date, only entry into the Top 20. In addition, it was Tippin's last single to reach the Top Ten on the country charts. The song was released in the wake of the September 11 attacks. All proceeds from the single went to the Red Cross and its relief efforts for the families of the victims. According to then label president, Randy Goodman, the single raised approximately $250,000.

== Content ==
Tippin had written the song with Kenny Beard and Casey Beathard for his 2000 album People Like Us, but it did not make the cut. He says, "But now, I know exactly why it didn't. It had a bigger purpose." Two days after the September 11 attacks, he went to a Nashville studio to record the song.

The lyrics of the song offer a highly patriotic view of the United States.

== Music video ==
The music video was directed by Trey Fanjoy and it was filmed in September 2001. It was filmed in many different locations around New York City and shows citizens of New York and the rubble of the World Trade Center.

== Chart performance ==
"Where the Stars and Stripes and the Eagle Fly" debuted at number 34 on the U.S. Billboard Hot Country Singles & Tracks chart for the week of October 6, 2001.

Chart (2001–2002)	Peak position
US Hot Country Songs (Billboard)	2
US Billboard Hot 100	20

=== Year-end charts ===
Chart (2002)	Position
US Country Songs (Billboard)	38
