= Smoke a Little Smoke =

Single by Eric Church

from the album Carolina
- Released: June 21, 2010
- Recorded: 2009
- Genre: Country; country blues
- Length: 3:11
- Label: Capitol Nashville
- Songwriters: Eric Church; Jeff Hyde; Driver Williams
- Producer: Jay Joyce

Eric Church singles chronology
"Hell on the Heart" (2009)	"Smoke a Little Smoke" (2010)	"Homeboy" (2011)

"Smoke a Little Smoke" is a song co-written and recorded by American country music singer Eric Church. It was released in June 2010 as the third and final single from his 2009 album Carolina. It was also the eighth single of Church's career to reach the top 20 on the U.S. Billboard Hot Country Songs chart after peaking at number 16. Church wrote this song with Jeff Hyde and Driver Williams.

Church's record label urged him not to release the song due to its cannabis references.

== Critical reception ==
Karlie Justus of Engine 145 gave the song a "thumbs-up", saying that it "puts Church's bravado posturing to good use." She also praised the song's production, saying that it "makes no attempts to temper the song’s spot-on snapshot of trying to lose one’s self[…]in an effort to awkwardly make the project 'country.'" In his review of the album, Jonathan Keefe of Slant Magazine said that the song had "an interesting rhythm track[…]that actually reinforce[s] the tones." Country Standard Time reviewer Jeffrey B. Remz called it a "stark [reminder] that Church is making a valiant attempt to rekindle the outlaw movement." In 2017, Billboard contributor Chuck Dauphin put "Smoke a Little Smoke" at number eight on his top 10 list of Church's best songs.

== Music video ==
Church began filming the song's music video in July 2010. The video includes Church driving vintage cars at Clarksville Speedway, and includes a cameo from NASCAR driver Kasey Kahne. Of the video, Church said that he wanted to "show something[…] that [the fans] haven't seen before." The video was directed by Peter Zavadil.

== Chart performance ==
"Smoke a Little Smoke" first charted in mid-2009 as an album cut, spending one week at number 57 on the Hot Country Songs charts. In June 2010, it re-entered the same chart also at number 57. The song was a minor top 20.

Chart (2010–2011)	Peak position
Canada Country (Billboard)	39
US Hot Country Songs (Billboard)	16
US Billboard Hot 100	78

=== Year-end charts ===
Chart (2011)	Position
US Country Songs (Billboard)	79

== Certifications ==
Region	Certification	Certified units/sales
Canada (Music Canada)	Gold	40,000^{*}
United States (RIAA)	4× Platinum	4,000,000^{‡}
^{*} Sales figures based on certification alone.^{‡} Sales+streaming figures based on certification alone.
