= What This Country Needs =

Studio album by Aaron Tippin
- Released: October 6, 1998
- Genre: Country
- Length: 37:59
- Label: Lyric Street
- Producer: Pat McMakin; Aaron Tippin

Aaron Tippin chronology
Greatest Hits… and Then Some (1997)	What This Country Needs (1998)	People Like Us (2000)

Singles from What This Country Needs
- 1. "For You I Will" Released: August 3, 1998; 2. "I'm Leaving" Released: January 30, 1999; 3. "Her" Released: June 5, 1999

Professional ratings
Review scores
Source	Rating
Allmusic	4/5 stars

What This Country Needs is the sixth studio album by American country music artist Aaron Tippin, released on October 6, 1998. It was his first full studio album since switching from RCA Nashville to Lyric Street Records. The album includes three singles: "For You I Will", "I'm Leaving", and "Her", which respectively reached #6, #17, and #33 on the Billboard Hot Country Singles & Tracks (now Hot Country Songs) charts in 1999. The track "Sweetwater" was originally recorded by McBride & the Ride on their 1993 album Hurry Sundown, and by Greg Holland on his 1994 album Let Me Drive.

== Track listing ==
What This Country Needs track listing
No.	Title	Writer(s)	Length
1.	"What This Country Needs"	Aaron Tippin; Donny Kees	3:09
2.	"For You I Will"	Mark Nesler; Tony Martin	3:32
3.	"Her"	Craig Wiseman; Jeffrey Steele	3:14
4.	"I Didn't Come This Far (Just to Walk Away)"	Tippin; Michael P. Heeney	2:55
5.	"I'm Leaving"	Aaron Barker; Ron Harbin; L. David Lewis	3:21
6.	"Don't Stop (We're Just Gettin' Started)"	Al Anderson; Dean Dillon	3:03
7.	"Somewhere Under the Rainbow"	Scott Blackwell; Jerry Laseter; Kerry Kurt Phillips	3:35
8.	"Back When I Knew Everything"	Tippin; Mel Besher	3:02
9.	"Sweetwater"	Allen Shamblin; Jon Vezner	4:09
10.	"You're the Only Reason for Me"	Tippin; Heeney	3:32
Total length:			37:59

== Personnel ==
Amalgamated from liner notes

- Eddie Bayers - drums, percussion
- Dennis Burnside - piano, organ
- Aubrey Haynie - fiddle, mandolin
- Wes Hightower - background vocals (tracks 1, 3, 6, 7 & 9)
- Steve Hill - background vocals (tracks 2 - 11)
- Mike Johnson - steel guitar
- Chris Leuzinger - electric guitar (tracks 1, 3 - 5, 7, 9 - 11), acoustic guitar (track 4)
- Brent Mason - electric guitar (tracks 2, 4, 6 & 8)
- Michael Rhodes - bass guitar (tracks 1, 3 - 5, 7, 9 - 11)
- Aaron Tippin - lead vocals
- Biff Watson - acoustic guitar (tracks 1 - 3, 5 - 11)
- Glenn Worf - bass guitar (tracks 2, 6 & 8)
- Curtis Young - background vocals (tracks 1, 2, 4 - 6, 8, 10 & 11)

Strings arranged by Dennis Burnside and performed by the Nashville String Machine. Contracted by Carl Gorodetzky.

== Chart performance ==
=== Weekly charts ===
Chart (1998–99)	Peak position
US Top Country Albums (Billboard)	23

=== Year-end charts ===
Chart (1999)	Position
US Top Country Albums (Billboard)	60
