= Read Between the Lines (Aaron Tippin album) =

Studio album by Aaron Tippin
- Released: March 10, 1992
- Recorded: 1991
- Studio: Emerald Sound Studios, Recording Arts, Nashville, TN
- Genre: Country
- Length: 31:58
- Label: RCA Nashville
- Producer: Emory Gordy Jr.

Aaron Tippin chronology
You've Got to Stand for Something (1991)	Read Between the Lines (1992)	Call of the Wild (1993)

Singles from Read Between the Lines
- 1. "There Ain't Nothin' Wrong with the Radio" Released: February 10, 1992; 2. "I Wouldn't Have It Any Other Way" Released: June 22, 1992; 3. "I Was Born with a Broken Heart" Released: October 24, 1992; 4. "My Blue Angel" Released: February 1, 1993

Professional ratings
Review scores
Source	Rating
AllMusic	4/5 stars
Entertainment Weekly	A

Read Between the Lines is the second studio album by American country music artist Aaron Tippin. The album features Tippin's first number-one single, "There Ain't Nothin' Wrong With the Radio", as well as the hits "My Blue Angel", "I Was Born with a Broken Heart", and "I Wouldn't Have It Any Other Way". "I Was Born with a Broken Heart" was previously recorded by Josh Logan on his 1988 album Somebody Paints the Wall, from which it was also released as a single. David Ball also released the song on his 1989 self-titled debut album, although the album was not released until 1994.

== Track listing ==
Read Between the Lines track listing
No.	Title	Writer(s)	Length
1.	"The Sound of Your Goodbye (Sticks and Stones)"	Aaron Tippin; Michael P. Heeney	3:04
2.	"My Blue Angel"	Tippin; Kim Williams; Philip Douglas	3:24
3.	"If I Had It to Do Over"	Tippin; Buddy Brock	3:53
4.	"There Ain't Nothin' Wrong with the Radio"	Tippin; Brock	2:46
5.	"Read Between the Lines"	Tippin; Michael Puryear	3:42
6.	"This Heart"	Tippin; Donny Kees	2:55
7.	"These Sweet Dreams"	Tippin; Butch Curry	3:35
8.	"I Was Born with a Broken Heart"	Tippin; Jim McBride	2:39
9.	"I Wouldn't Have It Any Other Way"	Tippin; Curry	3:11
10.	"I Miss Misbehavin'"	Tippin; Charlie Craig; Mark Collie	2:49
Total length:			31:58

== Personnel ==
- Stuart Duncan – fiddle on "I Wouldn't Have It Any Other Way" and "Read Between the Lines"
- Dan Galysh – steel guitar on "I Miss Misbehavin'"
- Sonny Garrish – steel guitar
- Steve Gibson – electric guitar and six-string bass guitar on "The Sound of Your Goodbye"
- Emory Gordy Jr. – bass guitar
- Rob Hajacos – fiddle
- John Barlow Jarvis – keyboards
- Larrie Londin – drums, percussion
- Patty Loveless – background vocals on "These Sweet Dreams"
- Brent Mason – electric guitar, six-string bass guitar
- Andy Most – electric rhythm guitar on "My Blue Angel" and "I Was Born with a Broken Heart"
- Alan O'Bryant – background vocals
- Steve Thomas – fiddle on "There Ain't Nothin' Wrong with the Radio", "The Sound of Your Goodbye", and "I Miss Misbehavin'"
- Aaron Tippin - lead vocals
- Biff Watson – acoustic guitar

== Chart performance ==
Chart (1992)	Peak position
U.S. Billboard Top Country Albums	6
U.S. Billboard 200	50
Canadian RPM Country Albums	9
