= Without Your Love (Aaron Tippin song) =

Single by Aaron Tippin

from the album Tool Box
- B-side: "She Made a Man Out of a Mountain of Stone"
- Released: February 3, 1996
- Genre: Country
- Length: 3:29
- Label: RCA Nashville
- Songwriter(s): Al Anderson, Craig Wiseman
- Producer(s): Steve Gibson

Aaron Tippin singles chronology
"That's as Close as I'll Get to Loving You" (1995)	"Without Your Love" (1996)	"Everything I Own" (1996)

"Without Your Love" is a song recorded by American country music artist Aaron Tippin. It was released in February 1996 as the second single from the album Tool Box. the song reached #22 on the Billboard Hot Country Singles & Tracks chart. The song was written by Al Anderson and Craig Wiseman.

== Chart performance ==
Chart (1996)	Peak position
US Hot Country Songs (Billboard)	22
Canadian RPM Country Tracks	33
