= The Call of the Wild (song) =

Single by Aaron Tippin

from the album Call of the Wild
- B-side: "Nothin' in the World"
- Released: October 23, 1993
- Genre: Country
- Length: 4:32
- Label: RCA Nashville
- Songwriters: Aaron Tippin, Buddy Brock, Michael P. Heeney
- Producer: Scott Hendricks

Aaron Tippin singles chronology
"Workin' Man's Ph.D" (1993)	"The Call of the Wild" (1993)	"Honky Tonk Superman" (1994)

"The Call of the Wild" is a song co-written and recorded by American country music artist Aaron Tippin. It was released in October 1993 as the second single from the album Call of the Wild. The song reached #17 on the Billboard Hot Country Singles & Tracks chart. Tippin wrote the song with Buddy Brock and Michael P. Heeney.

== Chart performance ==
Chart (1993–1994)	Peak position
Canada Country Singles (RPM)	25
US Hot Country Songs (Billboard)	17
