= Hell on the Heart =

Single by Eric Church

from the album Carolina
- Released: October 12, 2009
- Recorded: 2009
- Genre: Country
- Length: 2:44
- Label: Capitol Nashville
- Songwriters: Eric Church; Deric Ruttan; Jeremy Spillman
- Producer: Jay Joyce

Eric Church singles chronology
| "Love Your Love the Most" (2009) | "Hell on the Heart" (2009) | "Smoke a Little Smoke" (2010) |

"Hell on the Heart" is a song co-written and recorded by American country music singer Eric Church. It was released in October 2009 as the seventh single of his career and the second one from his 2009 album Carolina. The song became Church's second Top 10 hit on the U.S. Billboard Hot Country Songs chart with a peak at number 10. Church wrote this song with Deric Ruttan and Jeremy Spillman.

== Content ==
In "Hell on the Heart," the male narrator addresses about a girl he knows, staying that she is "heaven on the eyes / But boy, she's hell on the heart."

Some listeners have described this song as "Beatles-esque". Accordingly, the music video for the song is reminiscent of Beatles performances from the 1960s, featuring Church and his band on a low, sparsely furnished stage in suits and neckties, with the drummer sitting and drumming in the rear in a very Ringo-like manner behind a slimmed-down kit and frequent shots of the mainly female audience. However, the Vox AC30 amps do not appear.

== Critical reception ==
Giving it three stars out of five, Chris Neal of Country Weekly magazine said that it "plays like an afterthought tucked away near the end of Carolina, but its modest charms stand up reasonably well on their own." Karlie Justus of Engine 145 gave the song a thumbs-up, criticizing the "lazy" lyrics and "awkward" production, but said that it showed Church's "knack for composing a hook that can make even the most inane song[…]stick with listeners after its three minutes expire." Both Neal and Justus compared the song's theme to Terri Clark's 1998 single "You're Easy on the Eyes."

== Chart performance ==
"Hell on the Heart" debuted at number 52 on the U.S. Billboard Hot Country Songs charts dated for the week of October 24, 2009, and, like his previous hit, "Love Your Love The Most," peaked at number 10.

| Chart (2009–2010) | Peak position |
|---|---|
| Canada Country (Billboard) | 20 |
| US Hot Country Songs (Billboard) | 10 |
| US Billboard Hot 100 | 67 |

=== Year-end charts ===
| Chart (2010) | Position |
|---|---|
| US Country Songs (Billboard) | 54 |

== Certifications ==
| Region | Certification | Certified units/sales |
|---|---|---|
| United States (RIAA) | Platinum | 1,000,000^{‡} |
^{‡} Sales+streaming figures based on certification alone.
