= People Like Us (Aaron Tippin album) =

Studio album by Aaron Tippin
- Released: July 25, 2000
- Studio: Sound Shop (Nashville, Tennessee)
- Genre: Country
- Length: 37:40
- Label: Lyric Street
- Producer: Mike Bradley; Aaron Tippin; Biff Watson

Aaron Tippin chronology
What This Country Needs (1998)	People Like Us (2000)	A December to Remember (2001)

Singles from People Like Us
- 1. "Kiss This" Released: May 22, 2000; 2. "People Like Us" Released: January 8, 2001; 3. "Always Was" Released: August 11, 2001

Professional ratings
Review scores
Source	Rating
Allmusic	3/5 stars

People Like Us is the seventh studio album by American country music artist Aaron Tippin, released on July 25, 2000 by Lyric Street Records. His second album for the Lyric Street label, it features his third and final number one single on the country charts, "Kiss This". Also released from this album were the title track and "Always Was". Tippin's wife, Thea, co-wrote "Kiss This" and "The Best Love We Ever Made", and sang duet vocals on the latter as well as adding the "See Ya!" line at the end of "Kiss This".

== Track listing ==
What This Country Needs track listing
No.	Title	Writer(s)	Length
1.	"Kiss This"	Aaron Tippin; Thea Tippin; Philip Douglas	2:53
2.	"And I Love You"	Casey Beathard; Odie Blackmon	3:07
3.	"People Like Us"	David Lee Murphy; Kim Tribble	3:22
4.	"Always Was"	Tony Colton; Bobby Wood	4:01
5.	"I'd Be Afraid of Losing You"	Mark Collie; Leslie Satcher	3:36
6.	"Lost"	Steve Seskin; Craig Wiseman	3:15
7.	"Big Boy Toys"	A. Tippin; Buddy Brock	3:11
8.	"Twenty-Nine and Holding"	A. Tippin; Marcus Franklin Johnson	3:42
9.	"Every Now and Then (I Wish Then Was Now)"	A. Tippin; Michael P. Heeney	3:23
10.	"The Night Shift"	A. Tippin; Johnson	3:06
11.	"The Best Love We Ever Made" (with Thea Tippin)	A. Tippin; T. Tippin	3:57
Total length:			37:40

== Personnel ==
Adapted from the album's liner notes.

- Mike Bradley - rebar on "Big Boy Toys"
- Melodie Crittenden - background vocals on "Kiss This"
- Paul Franklin - pedal steel guitar, lap steel guitar
- Aubrey Haynie - fiddle, mandolin
- Joanna Janét - background vocals on "Kiss This"
- Brent Mason - electric guitar
- Steve Nathan - piano, keyboards, Hammond B-3 organ, Wurlitzer electric piano
- Kim Parent - background vocals on "Kiss This" and "The Best Love We Ever Made"
- John Wesley Ryles - background vocals
- Thea Tippin - "See ya" on "Kiss This"; duet vocals on "The Best Love We Ever Made"
- Biff Watson - electric guitar, acoustic guitar, 6 string bass, gut string guitar, shaker; ratchet wrench and wire saw on "Big Boy Toys"
- Dennis Wilson - background vocals
- Lonnie Wilson - drums, drum loops, tambourine
- Glenn Worf - bass guitar

== Charts ==
=== Weekly charts ===
Weekly chart performance for People Like Us
Chart (2000)	Peak position
Canadian Country Albums (RPM)	16
US Billboard 200	53
US Top Country Albums (Billboard)	5

=== Year-end charts ===
Year-end chart performance for People Like Us
Chart (2000)	Position
US Top Country Albums (Billboard)	26
Chart (2001)	Position
US Top Country Albums (Billboard)	29
