= Call of the Wild (Aaron Tippin album) =

Studio album by Aaron Tippin
- Released: August 10, 1993
- Recorded: 1993
- Studio: Sound Shop (Nashville, Tennessee)
- Genre: Country
- Length: 32:45
- Label: RCA Nashville
- Producer: Scott Hendricks

Aaron Tippin chronology
Read Between the Lines (1992)	Call of the Wild (1993)	Lookin' Back at Myself (1994)

Singles from Call of the Wild
- 1. "Workin' Man's Ph.D." Released: June 21, 1993; 2. "The Call of the Wild" Released: October 23, 1993; 3. "Honky Tonk Superman" Released: January 1994; 4. "Whole Lotta Love on the Line" Released: April 23, 1994

Call of the Wild is the third studio album by American country music singer Aaron Tippin. Released in 1993 on RCA Records Nashville, it produced the singles "The Call of the Wild", "Honky-Tonk Superman", "Workin' Man's Ph.D.", and "Whole Lotta Love on the Line". Of these, only "Workin' Man's Ph.D" reached Top 10 on the U.S. Billboard country charts. The album was produced by Scott Hendricks, unlike Tippin's first two albums which were produced by Emory Gordy, Jr.

== Critical reception ==
Brian Mansfield of Allmusic gave the album three stars out of five, saying that "some of Tippin's song choices were hillbilly silly." Mike Greenblatt of Modern Screen's Country Music gave a mostly-favorable review, saying that the album showed a sense of artistic growth over his first two discs, making note of Tippin's "one-of-a-kind, elastic voice" but referring to "Whole Lotta Love on the Line" as being "in that netherworld of benign country fluff."

== Track listing ==
Call of the Wild track listing
No.	Title	Writer(s)	Length
1.	"The Call of the Wild"	Aaron Tippin; Buddy Brock; Michael P. Heeney	4:32
2.	"Honky-Tonk Superman"	Tippin; Brock	2:54
3.	"Nothin' in the World (Gonna Keep Me from You)"	Tippin; Terry M. Brown	2:34
4.	"Workin' Man's Ph.D."	Tippin; Philip Douglas; Bobby Boyd	3:31
5.	"I Promised You the World"	Tippin; Bruce Burch; Vern Dant	4:54
6.	"When Country Took the Throne"	Tippin; Brock	2:26
7.	"Let's Talk About You"	Tippin; Brock	2:46
8.	"Whole Lotta Love on the Line"	Tippin; Donny Kees	3:44
9.	"My Kind of Town"	Tippin; Sanger D. Shafer	3:02
10.	"Trim Yourself to Fit the World"	Tippin; Douglas; Kim Williams	2:35
Total length:			32:45

== Personnel ==
Adapted from liner notes.

- Stuart Duncan – fiddle, mandolin on "Whole Lotta Love on the Line"
- Paul Franklin – pedal steel guitar
- Brent Mason – electric guitar
- Alan O'Bryant – background vocals on "The Call of the Wild"
- Matt Rollings – piano
- John Wesley Ryles – background vocals on all tracks except "Whole Lotta Love on the Line", "The Call of the Wild", and "When Country Took the Throne"
- Aaron Tippin - lead vocals
- Cindy Richardson Walker – background vocals on "I Promised You the World"
- Billy Joe Walker Jr. – acoustic guitar
- Dennis Wilson – background vocals on "I Promised You the World"
- Lonnie Wilson – drums
- Glenn Worf – bass guitar

== Charts ==
=== Weekly charts ===
Chart (1993)	Peak position
Canadian Country Albums (RPM)	12
US Billboard 200	53
US Top Country Albums (Billboard)	6

=== Year-end charts ===
Chart (1993)	Position
US Top Country Albums (Billboard)	66
Chart (1994)	Position
US Top Country Albums (Billboard)	49
