= You've Got to Stand for Something =

Studio album by Aaron Tippin
- Released: January 22, 1991
- Recorded: 1990–1991
- Studio: Emerald Sound Studios, Masterfonics, Nightingale Recording Studio, Recording Arts, Sound Stage Studios, Nashville, TN
- Genre: Country
- Length: 29:22
- Label: RCA Nashville
- Producer: Emory Gordy Jr.

Aaron Tippin chronology
You've Got to Stand for Something (1991)	Read Between the Lines (1992)

Singles from You've Got to Stand for Something
- 1. "You've Got to Stand for Something" Released: October 8, 1990; 2. "I Wonder How Far It Is Over You" Released: April 6, 1991; 3. "She Made a Memory Out of Me" Released: July 1991

Professional ratings
Review scores
Source	Rating
AllMusic	4.5/5 stars
Entertainment Weekly	A

You've Got to Stand for Something is the debut studio album by American country music artist Aaron Tippin. The title track was Tippin's first chart entry, peaking at No. 6 on the Billboard country charts in 1991. Also released from this album were "I Wonder How Far It Is Over You" and "She Made a Memory Out of Me", which reached Nos. 40 and 54, respectively. The songs reached higher on the Radio and Records Country chart, reaching Nos. 5, 26, and 35, respectively. "In My Wildest Dreams" would be recorded by Kenny Chesney as the title track to his 1994 debut album In My Wildest Dreams.

== Track listing ==
You've Got to Stand for Something track listing
No.	Title	Writer(s)	Length
1.	"In My Wildest Dreams"	Aaron Tippin; Donny Kees	2:39
2.	"I've Got a Good Memory"	Tippin; Buddy Brock	3:01
3.	"You've Got to Stand for Something"	Tippin; Brock	3:01
4.	"I Wonder How Far It Is Over You"	Tippin; Brock	3:30
5.	"Ain't That a Hell of a Note"	Tippin; Terry Brown	2:34
6.	"The Man That Came Between Us (Was Me)"	Tippin; Butch Curry	3:08
7.	"She Made a Memory Out of Me"	Tippin	2:30
8.	"Up Against You" (^{A})	Tippin; Brock	3:07
9.	"The Sky's Got the Blues"	Tippin; Ronnie Rogers	3:00
10.	"Many, Many, Many Beers Ago"	Tippin; Philip Douglas	2:53
Total length:			29:22

- ^{A}Omitted from cassette version.

== Personnel ==
Adapted from liner notes.

- Sam Bush – fiddle (track 8)
- Glen Duncan – fiddle
- Paul Franklin – steel guitar (tracks 3, 4, 9)
- Vince Gill – background vocals
- Emory Gordy Jr. – bass guitar
- John Barlow Jarvis – keyboards
- Larrie Londin – drums, percussion
- Brent Mason – electric guitar
- Weldon Myrick – steel guitar (track 6)
- Alan O'Bryant – background vocals
- Mark O'Connor – mandolin, fiddle (tracks 2, 3, 4, 9)
- Kayton Roberts – steel guitar
- Aaron Tippin – lead vocals
- Biff Watson – acoustic guitar

== Charts ==
=== Weekly charts ===
Chart (1991)	Peak position
US Billboard 200	153
US Top Country Albums (Billboard)	23

=== Year-end charts ===
Chart (1991)	Position
US Top Country Albums (Billboard)	37
