= Lookin' Back at Myself =

Studio album by Aaron Tippin
- Released: November 8, 1994
- Genre: Country
- Length: 31:35
- Label: RCA Nashville
- Producer: Steve Gibson

Aaron Tippin chronology
Call of the Wild (1993)	Lookin' Back at Myself (1994)	Tool Box (1995)

Singles from Lookin' Back at Myself
- 1. "I Got It Honest" Released: September 26, 1994; 2. "She Feels Like a Brand New Man Tonight" Released: February 25, 1995

Professional ratings
Review scores
Source	Rating
Allmusic	link

Lookin' Back at Myself is the fourth studio album from American country music artist Aaron Tippin. It was released in 1994 via RCA Records Nashville. The album includes the singles "I Got It Honest" and "She Feels Like a Brand New Man Tonight," both of which entered the country music charts; respectively, they peaked at #15 and #39. It became his first album to not feature a Top 10 Hit. "Country Boy's Tool Box" later appeared on Tippin's next album, Tool Box.

== Track listing ==
Lookin' Back at Myself track listing
No.	Title	Writer(s)	Length
1.	"I Got It Honest"	Aaron Tippin; Bruce Burch; Marcus Franklin Johnson	3:45
2.	"Lovin' Me Into an Early Grave"	Tippin; Phillip Douglas	2:37
3.	"She's Got a Way (Of Makin' Me Forget)"	Tippin; Charlie Craig	3:49
4.	"Country Boy's Tool Box"	Tippin; Ronnie Rogers	3:02
5.	"Lookin' Back at Myself"	Tippin; Leigh Reynolds	3:29
6.	"Bayou Baby"	Tippin; Michael Puryear	2:40
7.	"Standin' on the Promises"	Tippin; Douglas	2:59
8.	"Mission from Hank"	Don Schlitz; Thom Schuyler	3:12
9.	"She Feels Like a Brand New Man Tonight"	Tippin; Michael P. Heeney	2:52
10.	"You Are the Woman"	Tippin; Donny Kees	3:10
Total length:			31:35

== Personnel ==
Musicians

- Dennis Burnside - piano
- Stuart Duncan - fiddle
- Paul Franklin - pedal steel guitar
- Steve Gibson - electric guitar
- John Barlow Jarvis - piano
- Brent Mason - electric guitar
- Bobby Ogdin - keyboards
- Tom Robb - bass guitar
- John Wesley Ryles - background vocals
- Hank Singer - fiddle
- Harry Stinson - background vocals
- Billy Joe Walker Jr. - acoustic guitar
- Biff Watson - acoustic guitar
- Dennis Wilson - background vocals
- Lonnie Wilson - drums
- Glenn Worf - bass guitar
- Curtis Young - background vocals

Technical

- Mike Bradley - recording
- Steve Gibson - producer
- John Kelton - mixing
- Marshall Morgan - recording
- Denny Purcell - mastering
- Alan Schulman - recording

== Charts ==
=== Weekly charts ===
Chart (1994–95)	Peak position
US Top Country Albums (Billboard)	114
US Heatseekers Albums (Billboard)	19

=== Year-end charts ===
Chart (1995)	Position
US Top Country Albums (Billboard)	62
