= I Wouldn't Have It Any Other Way =

Single by Aaron Tippin

from the album Read Between the Lines
- B-side: "What I Can't Live Without"
- Released: June 22, 1992
- Genre: Country
- Length: 3:11
- Label: RCA Nashville
- Songwriters: Butch Curry, Aaron Tippin
- Producer: Emory Gordy Jr.

Aaron Tippin singles chronology
"There Ain't Nothin' Wrong with the Radio" (1992)	"I Wouldn't Have It Any Other Way" (1992)	"I Was Born with a Broken Heart" (1992)

"I Wouldn't Have it Any Other Way" is a song co-written and recorded by American country music singer Aaron Tippin. It was released in June 1992 as the second single from the album, Read Between the Lines. The song reached the Top 5 on the Billboard Hot Country Singles & Tracks chart and peaked at number 4 on the Canadian RPM Country Tracks chart. It was written by Tippin and Butch Curry.

== Critical reception ==
Deborah Evans Price, of Billboard magazine reviewed the song favorably, calling it a "bright, feisty, and up-tempo manifesto of individuality, somewhat in the vein of Tippin's previous hit 'You've Got to Stand for Something.'"

== Music video ==
The music video was directed by Marius Penczner and premiered in May 1992. The video shows employees buying and running the factory that was about to be sold out from under them.

== Chart performance ==
"I Wouldn't Have It Any Other Way" debuted at number 75 on the U.S. Billboard Hot Country Singles & Tracks chart for the week of June 20, 1992

Chart (1992)	Peak position
Canada Country Singles (RPM)	4
US Hot Country Songs (Billboard)	5

=== Year-end charts ===
Chart (1992)	Position
Canada Country Tracks (RPM)	94
US Country Songs (Billboard)	60
