= Whole Lotta Love on the Line =

Single by Aaron Tippin

from the album Call of the Wild
- B-side: "I Promised You the World"
- Released: April 23, 1994
- Genre: Country
- Length: 3:44
- Label: RCA Nashville
- Songwriter(s): Aaron Tippin, Donny Kees
- Producer(s): Scott Hendricks

Aaron Tippin singles chronology
"Honky Tonk Superman" (1994)	"Whole Lotta Love on the Line" (1994)	"I Got It Honest" (1994)

"Whole Lotta Love on the Line" is a song co-written and recorded by American country music artist Aaron Tippin. It was released in April 1994 as the fourth single from the album Call of the Wild. The song reached No. 30 on the Billboard Hot Country Singles & Tracks chart. The song was written by Tippin and Donny Kees.

== Other versions ==
The song was originally recorded by Charley Pride on his 1990 album The Best of Charley Pride, released on Curb Records.

== Chart performance ==
Chart (1994)	Peak position
US Hot Country Songs (Billboard)	30
Canadian RPM Country Tracks	27
