= People Like Us (Aaron Tippin song) =

2001 single by Aaron Tippin

Single by Aaron Tippin

from the album People Like Us
- Released: January 8, 2001
- Genre: Country
- Length: 3:07
- Label: Lyric Street
- Songwriters: David Lee Murphy; Kim Tribble
- Producers: Aaron Tippin; Biff Watson; Mike Bradley

Aaron Tippin singles chronology
"Kiss This" (2000)	"People Like Us" (2001)	"Always Was" (2001)

"People Like Us" is a song written by David Lee Murphy and Kim Tribble, and recorded by American country music artist, Aaron Tippin. It was released on January 8, 2001, as the second single from the album of the same name. The song reached number 17 on the Billboard Hot Country Singles & Tracks chart.

== Music video ==
The music video was directed by Trey Fanjoy and premiered in February 2001.

== Chart performance ==
"People Like Us" debuted at number 59 on the U.S. Billboard Hot Country Singles & Tracks for the week of January 13, 2001.

Chart (2001)	Peak position
US Hot Country Songs (Billboard)	17
US Bubbling Under Hot 100 (Billboard)	7
