= Josh Logan (country singer) =

American singer-songwriter

- Origin: Cartersville, Kentucky, United States
- Genres: Country
- Occupation: Singer
- Instruments: Vocals acoustic guitar
- Years active: 1980–present
- Label: Curb

Josh Logan (born Larry Childers in Cartersville, Kentucky) is an American country music artist. He has recorded four albums, including one for the Curb Records label in 1988. This album, Somebody Paints the Wall, included three chart singles, two of which were later released by other artists as well: the title track by Tracy Lawrence, and "I Was Born with a Broken Heart" by Aaron Tippin, who also co-wrote it. Logan released a second album, Something Strange, in 1995, followed by Cartersville, Kentucky Country Boy in 2003.

== Biography ==
Josh Logan was born in Cartersville, Kentucky. As a teenager, he was taught guitar chords by his cousin. For twelve years, Logan worked at an auto salvage yard, performing nightly at local bars. Logan's musical inspirations were George Jones, Merle Haggard, and Mel Street, to whom he has been compared in vocal styling.

Eventually, Logan was signed to Curb Records, releasing his debut single "I Made You a Woman for Somebody Else", which was withdrawn when Conway Twitty recorded it. By 1988, Logan had released his first album Somebody Paints the Wall. This album produced three chart singles, the highest-charting being "Every Time I Get to Dreamin'", which spent nine weeks on the Billboard Hot Country Singles (now Hot Country Songs) charts and peaked at No. 58. Both it and its follow-up, "Somebody Paints the Wall", reached Top 40 on the Cash Box country charts as well. The latter song was also a Top 10 for Tracy Lawrence in 1992.

The album's success led to tours with Garth Brooks and Earl Thomas Conley. The third and final single, "I Was Born with a Broken Heart", was co-written by Aaron Tippin, whose own version was later released as a single from his 1992 album Read Between the Lines. David Ball also recorded the song on his 1989 self-titled debut, although this album was not released until 1994. Logan left Curb in the early 1990s, then he released an album called Something Strange in Europe in 1995. This album produced multiple singles on the European country singles charts, including two top-20 hits.

Logan was honored in 2002 with a display at the Kentucky Music Hall of Fame in Renfro Valley, Kentucky. One year later, he released his third album, Cartersville, Kentucky Country Boy, followed by I Am What I Am in 2009.

== Discography ==
=== Albums ===
Title	Album details
That's How Angels Lose Their Wings	Release date: 1984; Label: Multi-Tempo-Country
Somebody Paints the Wall	Release date: 1988; Label: Curb Records
Something Strange	Release date: 1995; Label: Bob Grady Records
Cartersville Kentucky Country Boy	Release date: May 20, 2003; Label: Coppercreek Records
I Am What I Am	Release date: March 24, 2009; Label: Coppercreek Records

=== Singles ===
Year	Single	Peak positions	Album
Year	Single	US Country	Album
1988	"I Made You a Woman for Somebody Else"	—	—N/a
1988	"Every Time I Get to Dreamin'"	58	Somebody Paints the Wall
1989	"Somebody Paints the Wall"	62	Somebody Paints the Wall
1989	"I Was Born with a Broken Heart"	75	Somebody Paints the Wall
1990	"Dallas-Fort Worth Airport"	—	—N/a
"—" denotes releases that did not chart
