= If Her Lovin' Don't Kill Me =

Single by Aaron Tippin

from the album Stars & Stripes
- Released: August 10, 2002
- Genre: Country
- Length: 3:04
- Label: Lyric Street
- Songwriters: John Rich, Tim Womack, Vicky McGehee
- Producers: Aaron Tippin, Biff Watson, Mike Bradley

Aaron Tippin singles chronology
"Where the Stars and Stripes and the Eagle Fly" (2001)	"If Her Lovin' Don't Kill Me" (2002)	"Love Like There's No Tomorrow" (2002)

"If Her Lovin' Don't Kill Me" is a song first recorded by American country music artist Aaron Tippin. It was released in August 2002 as the second single from the album Stars & Stripes. The song reached #40 on the Billboard Hot Country Singles & Tracks chart. The song was written by John Rich, Vicky McGehee, and Tim Womack, then a member of Sons of the Desert.

== John Anderson version ==
"If Her Lovin' Don't Kill Me"

Single by John Anderson

from the album Easy Money
- Released: August 14, 2006
- Genre: Country
- Length: 3:03
- Label: Warner Bros. Nashville
- Songwriters: John Rich, Tim Womack, Vicky McGehee
- Producer: John Rich

John Anderson singles chronology
"It Ain't Easy Being Me" (2001)	"If Her Lovin' Don't Kill Me" (2006)	"A Woman Knows" (2007)

The song was recorded by American country music artist John Anderson and released in August 2006 as the first single from his album Easy Money. The song reached No. 59 on the Billboard Hot Country Songs chart.

== Chart performance ==
=== Aaron Tippin ===
Chart (2002)	Peak position
US Hot Country Songs (Billboard)	40

=== John Anderson ===
Chart (2006)	Peak position
US Hot Country Songs (Billboard)	59
