= For You I Will (Aaron Tippin song) =

Single by Aaron Tippin

from the album What This Country Needs
- B-side: "Back When I Knew Everything"
- Released: August 3, 1998
- Genre: Country
- Length: 3:32
- Label: Lyric Street
- Songwriters: Mark Nesler, Tony Martin
- Producers: Pat McMakin, Aaron Tippin

Aaron Tippin singles chronology
"A Door" (1997)	"For You I Will" (1998)	"I'm Leaving" (1999)

"For You I Will" is a song written by Mark Nesler and Tony Martin, and recorded by American country music singer Aaron Tippin. It was released in August 1998 as the lead single from the album, What This Country Needs. The song reached number 6 on the U.S. Billboard Hot Country Singles & Tracks chart and number 49 on the Billboard Hot 100. It also reached number 27 on the Canadian RPM Country Tracks chart.

== Critical reception ==
Deborah Evans Price, of Billboard magazine reviewed the song favorably, saying that Tippin's vocals "have a warmer, mellower tone - still country, but not quite as twangy." She compares his vocals on this song to "That's as Close as I'll Get to Loving You." She says that Tippin "forgoes his frequent working-man theme for a straight-ahead romantic number complete with lovely lyrical promises set against the backdrop of a steel guitar."

== Music video ==
The music video was directed by Steven R. Monroe and premiered in mid-1998.

== Charts ==
=== Weekly charts ===
Chart (1998–1999)	Peak position
Canada Country Singles (RPM)	27
US Billboard Hot 100	49
US Hot Country Songs (Billboard)	6

=== Year-end charts ===
Chart (1999)	Position
US Country Songs (Billboard)	57
