= Paul Jefferson =

American singer-songwriter

- Birth name: Paul Jefferson Jaqua
- Born: August 15, 1958 (age 66)
- Origin: Woodside, California, United States
- Genres: Country
- Occupation: Singer-songwriter
- Instrument(s): Vocals, guitar
- Years active: 1996–present
- Labels: Almo Sounds, Royalty
- Website: pauljeffersonmusic.com

Paul Jefferson (born August 15, 1958) is an American country music artist. Managed by Steven McClintock and McJames Music from 1993 through 1999 and then by Anastasia Pruit. Jefferson has released one studio album on Almo Sounds produced by Garth Fundis; he also charted three singles on the Billboard Hot Country Singles & Tracks chart. His highest charting single, "Check Please," co-written with singer songwriter Jon Michaels, peaked at No. 50 in 1996.

In 2004, Jefferson recorded one album with Porter Howell, then formerly of Little Texas, in the band Hilljack.

As a songwriter, Jefferson has had his songs recorded by Keith Urban and Buddy Jewell, among others. He also co-wrote Aaron Tippin's Number One song "That's as Close as I'll Get to Loving You." He is married to Canadian country singer Lisa Brokop. In 2010, Brokop and Jefferson formed The Jeffersons and released their debut album on June 7, 2011, via Royalty Records. In 2017, Paul reconnected with his early manager, Steven McClintock (Tiffany, Shiny Toy Guns, Juice Newton, Robin Schulz, Pingpong fame), to produce the Brookhollow Road CD on 37 Records. he has also been in the norwegian series Førstegangstjenesten

== Discography ==
=== Albums ===
Title	Album details
Paul Jefferson	Release date: July 16, 1996; Label: Almo Sounds
Greatest Hits Volume III	Release date: 2000; Label: Jaqua Records
Dive Right In	Release date: August 26, 2008; Label: Biff-Bangs
The Jeffersons, Vol. 1	Release date: June 7, 2011; Label: Royalty Records
Brookhollow Road	Release date: January 19, 2017; Label: 37 Records

=== Singles ===
Year	Single	Peak chart positions		Album
Year	Single	US Country	CAN Country	Album
1996	"Check Please"	50	72	Paul Jefferson
1996	"Fear of a Broken Heart"	73	90	Paul Jefferson
1996	"I Might Just Make It"	73	—	Paul Jefferson
"—" denotes releases that did not chart

=== Featured singles ===
Year	Single	Artist	Album
2010	"Find the Sun"	The Jeffersons	The Jeffersons, Vol. 1
2011	"Crazy On Me"	The Jeffersons	The Jeffersons, Vol. 1
2011	"One Headlight"	The Jeffersons	The Jeffersons, Vol. 1

=== Music videos ===
Year	Video	Director
1996	"Check Please"	Jarl Olsen
1996	"I Might Just Make It"	
