= In Overdrive =

Studio album by Aaron Tippin
- Released: February 3, 2009
- Genre: Country
- Length: 48:40
- Label: Country Crossing
- Producer: Tim Grogan; Aaron Tippin

Aaron Tippin chronology
| Stars & Stripes (2002) | In Overdrive (2009) | All in the Same Boat (2013) |

Professional ratings
Review scores
| Source | Rating |
|---|---|
| AllMusic | 3.5/5 stars |

In Overdrive is an album released in 2009 by American country music artist Aaron Tippin. The album is composed of truck driving song covers with the exception of the last two tracks, which are original. Tippin's 2008 single, "Drill Here, Drill Now", is also featured on the album. Among the covers are "Drivin' My Life Away" (a number-one country single for Eddie Rabbitt) and "Roll On (Eighteen Wheeler)" (a number-one hit for Alabama).

== Track listing ==
In Overdrive track listing
| No. | Title | Writer(s) | Length |
|---|---|---|---|
| 1. | "East Bound and Down" | Jerry Reed; Deena Kaye Rose | 2:53 |
| 2. | "Truck Drivin' Man" | Terry Fell | 4:28 |
| 3. | "Drivin' My Life Away" | David Malloy; Eddie Rabbitt; Even Stevens | 3:32 |
| 4. | "Six Days on the Road" | Earl Green; Carl Montgomery | 3:03 |
| 5. | "Chicken Truck" | John Anderson; Monroe Fields; James Ervan Parker | 3:22 |
| 6. | "The Ballad of Danger Dave and Double Trouble" | Don Bradley; Rod Lewis; Tim Grogan | 3:18 |
| 7. | "Prisoner of the Highway" | Mike Reid | 3:48 |
| 8. | "Girl on the Billboard" | Walter Haynes; Hank Mills | 2:44 |
| 9. | "Long White Line" | Buford Abner | 3:10 |
| 10. | "Movin' On" | Merle Haggard | 3:19 |
| 11. | "The White Knight" | Jay Huguely | 4:20 |
| 12. | "Roll On" | Dave Loggins | 3:40 |
| 13. | "Drivin' Fool" | Terry Brown; Aaron Tippin | 3:19 |
| 14. | "Drill Here, Drill Now" | Phillip Douglas; Dan Murph; A. Tippin; Thea Tippin | 3:44 |
| Total length: | | | 48:40 |

== Personnel ==
- Pat Buchanan - electric guitar
- Tim Grogan - drums
- Rich Herring - acoustic guitar
- Mike Johnson - steel guitar
- Rod Lewis - bass guitar
- Bobby Lovett - banjo, electric guitar
- Brent Mason - electric guitar
- Jerry Roe - drums, acoustic guitar
- David Sloas - background vocals
- Aaron Tippin - lead vocals
- Thea Tippin - background vocals
- Darrin Vincent - background vocals

Track information and credits adapted from the album's liner notes.

== Charts ==
| Chart (2009) | Peak position |
|---|---|
| US Top Country Albums (Billboard) | 73 |

== See also ==
- Drill, baby, drill
