= I Got It Honest =

Single by Aaron Tippin

from the album Lookin' Back at Myself
- B-side: "Lookin' Back at Myself"
- Released: September 26, 1994
- Genre: Country
- Length: 3:45
- Label: RCA Nashville
- Songwriters: Bruce Burch, Marcus Franklin Johnson, Aaron Tippin
- Producer: Steve Gibson

Aaron Tippin singles chronology
"Whole Lotta Love on the Line" (1994)	"I Got It Honest" (1994)	"She Feels Like a Brand New Man Tonight" (1995)

"I Got It Honest" is a song co-written and recorded by American country music singer Aaron Tippin. It was released in September 1994 as the lead single from the album, Lookin' Back at Myself. The song reached number 15 on the U.S. Billboard Hot Country Singles & Tracks chart and peaked at number 9 on the Canadian RPM Country Tracks chart. It was written by Tippin, Marcus Franklin Johnson, and Bruce Burch.

== Music video ==
The music video premiered in late 1994.

== Chart performance ==
Chart (1994)	Peak position
Canada Country Singles (RPM)	9
US Hot Country Songs (Billboard)	15
