= Rust Nashville =

American record label

- Founded: 1998
- Founder: Ken Cooper
- Defunct: January 2007
- Genre: Country
- Country of origin: United States
- Location: Nashville, TN
- Official website: Rust Records Nashville

Rust Nashville was a recording company founded by Ken Cooper in 1998, originally to promote his band Vertigogo. It was originally based out of Northeast Ohio, most notably Cleveland, before its move to Nashville, TN, in 2005. The label represented notable country artists such as Aaron Tippin and Shane Owens.

== Origins ==
Ken Cooper started Rust Records as a way to promote his band rock band Vertigogo. Upon the band's major label signing to Atlantic Records and change of the band's name to Sinomatic due to infringement upon a recording group from France, Rust Records again went onto the back burner. Shortly after the release of Sinomatic's debut album however, the band fell apart in early 2002 and was subsequently dropped by their label.

Ken Cooper returned to his roots, once again thinking about his recording company in early 2003. The first release on the label was a rock band called Dear Violet, once again with Ken Cooper as the frontman. In 2004 Cooper retired from performing, began to focus on the label full-time. VP of Operations Keith Simmerer was brought on board, and proved to be the only other person to stay with the company over the course of its run. Starting with the alternative rock group Cherry Monroe, Rust became a Universal Imprint and was among the first labels to sign a deal with the then new Fontana Distribution company. They then released records by other local artists Between Home and Serenity, Blush, View From Everest, Southcott, and Lareau before venturing into country music with artist Shane Owens.

== Present day ==
In 2005, Rust Records made the move from Cleveland, OH, to Nashville, TN, where the company made a major change: it switched genres from rock & roll to country. In 2005, the band signed emerging artists The Povertyneck Hillbillies and Shane Owens. In 2006, Rust signed a partnership agreement with Aaron Tippin to release his work in partnership with his startup label Nippit Records and trio BlackHawk, who came over after being dropped from Columbia Records.

In January 2007, Rust Records closed its doors due to issues with its financial partners. All artists were released from their recording obligations at that time.

== See also ==
- List of record labels
