= My Blue Angel =

Single by Aaron Tippin

from the album Read Between the Lines
- B-side: "The Sound of Your Goodbye (Sticks and Stones)"
- Released: February 1, 1993
- Genre: Country
- Length: 3:24
- Label: RCA Nashville
- Songwriters: Kim Williams, Aaron Tippin, Philip Douglas
- Producer: Emory Gordy Jr.

Aaron Tippin singles chronology
"I Was Born with a Broken Heart" (1992)	"My Blue Angel" (1993)	"Workin' Man's Ph.D." (1993)

"My Blue Angel" is a song co-written and recorded by American country music singer Aaron Tippin. It was released in February 1993 as the fourth and final single from the album, Read Between the Lines. The song reached number 7 on the U.S. Billboard Hot Country Singles & Tracks chart and peaked at number 16 on the Canadian RPM Country Tracks chart. It was written by Tippin, Kim Williams, and Philip Douglas.

== Music video ==
The music video was directed by Jon Small and premiered in January 7, 1993. The video features a girl in a romantic relationship with Tippin's character who leaves him for a gangster only for it to be revealed by the gangster that she is an undercover police officer. In the ensuing bust she comes face to face with Tippin again only for him to reveal a detectives badge and the two embrace.

== Chart performance ==
"My Blue Angel" debuted at number 75 on the Hot Country Singles & Tracks chart for the week of January 30, 1993.

Chart (1993)	Peak position
Canada Country Singles (RPM)	16
US Hot Country Songs (Billboard)	7
