= There Ain't Nothin' Wrong with the Radio =

Single by Aaron Tippin

from the album Read Between the Lines
- B-side: "I Miss Misbehavin'"
- Released: February 10, 1992
- Genre: Country
- Length: 2:46
- Label: RCA Nashville
- Songwriters: Aaron Tippin, Buddy Brock
- Producer: Emory Gordy Jr.

Aaron Tippin singles chronology
"She Made a Memory Out of Me" (1991)	"There Ain't Nothin' Wrong with the Radio" (1992)	"I Wouldn't Have It Any Other Way" (1992)

"There Ain't Nothin' Wrong with the Radio" is a song co-written and recorded by American country music artist Aaron Tippin. It was released in February 1992 as the first single from his album Read Between the Lines. The song is not only his first Number One hit on the country music charts but also his longest-lasting at three weeks. Tippin wrote the song, along with Buddy Brock.

== Content ==
"There Ain't Nothin' Wrong with the Radio" is a song describing his old and run-down car. Despite its condition, he continues to drive it because "there ain't nothin' wrong with the radio." In other words, he can still tune in to all his favorite country stations. The song features an electric guitar and fiddle accompaniment.

== Music video ==
The music video for "There Ain't Nothin' Wrong with the Radio" was directed by John Lloyd Miller. It premiered on CMT on Valentine's Day, February 14, 1992. The video features Aaron Tippin performing at a concert sporting a mullet. At the beginning of the video for "There Ain't Nothin' Wrong with the Radio," before the song starts, Aaron Tippin talks about his home in upcountry South Carolina.

== Other versions ==
Tippin performed the song with Alvin and the Chipmunks on their 1992 album Chipmunks in Low Places. In this version, Simon repeatedly attempts to correct the song's grammar, singing "there isn't anything wrong with the radio". Tippin then explains that the song is supposed to have grammatical errors because it is country.

== Chart positions ==
"There Ain't Nothin' Wrong with the Radio" debuted at number 54 on Billboard Hot Country Singles & Tracks (now Hot Country Songs) for the chart week of February 15, 1992. On the chart week of April 18, 1992, it became Tippin's first Number One hit, holding the position for three weeks and then falling to number 10. It was also his only Number One on the RPM Country Tracks charts in Canada.

Chart (1992)	Peak position
Canada Country Singles (RPM)	1
US Hot Country Songs (Billboard)	1

=== Year-end charts ===
Chart (1992)	Position
Canada Country Tracks (RPM)	29
US Country Songs (Billboard)	31
