= A December to Remember =

Studio album by Aaron Tippin
- Released: September 18, 2001
- Genre: Country
- Length: 39:41
- Label: Lyric Street
- Producer: Mike Bradley, Aaron Tippin, Biff Watson

Aaron Tippin chronology
People Like Us (2000)	A December to Remember (2001)	Stars & Stripes (2002)

Professional ratings
Review scores
Source	Rating
Allmusic	link

A December to Remember is a Christmas album released by country music artist Aaron Tippin. The album is his first Christmas album, and it includes a mix of original songs and covers. Tippin's rendition of "Jingle Bell Rock" charted on the Hot Country Songs charts in late 2001.

== Track listing ==
A December to Remember track listing
No.	Title	Writer(s)	Length
1.	"Jingle Bell Rock"	Joe Beal; Jim Boothe	2:04
2.	"Blue Christmas"	Bill Hayes; Jay W. Johnson	3:03
3.	"It's a Good Thing Santa Ain't Single"	Aaron Tippin; Thea Tippin	3:07
4.	"Christmas Is the Warmest Time of the Year"	A. Tippin; T. Tippin; Kenny Beard	2:42
5.	"He Said That He Was Jesus"	A. Tippin; T. Tippin; Philip Douglas	4:29
6.	"Away in a Manger"	Traditional	3:02
7.	"The Year That Santa Never Came"	A. Tippin; T. Tippin	3:10
8.	"Run Rudolph Run"	Marvin Brodie; Johnny Marks	3:05
9.	"It's Way Too Close to Christmas to Be This Far from You"	A. Tippin; Billy Craven; Donny Kees	3:46
10.	"Mama's Gettin' Ready for Christmas"	A. Tippin; T. Tippin; Ricky Scruggs	3:18
11.	"A December to Remember"	A. Tippin; T. Tippin	3:42
12.	"Silent Night"	Franz Gruber; Joseph Mohr	4:26
Total length:			39:41

== Personnel ==
- Mike Brignardello - bass guitar
- Melodie Crittenden - background vocals
- Eric Darken - bells, chimes, cowbell, cymbals, shaker, sleigh bells, tambourine, whistle, wood block
- Paul Franklin - lap steel guitar, pedal steel guitar
- Aubrey Haynie - fiddle, mandolin, octave fiddle
- Wes Hightower - background vocals
- Jim Hoke - harmonica, tenor saxophone
- Liana Manis - background vocals
- Brent Mason - electric guitar, gut string guitar
- Steve Nathan - Hammond B-3 organ, piano, synthesizer, synthesizer horns, synthesizer strings, Wurlitzer
- John Wesley Ryles - background vocals
- Aaron Tippin - lead vocals
- Biff Watson - acoustic guitar, electric guitar, gut string guitar

== Chart performance ==
Chart (2001)	Peak position
U.S. Billboard Top Country Albums	42
