= Joanna Janét =

American country music singer

- Origin: Baton Rouge, Louisiana
- Genres: Country
- Occupation: Singer
- Labels: DreamWorks Nashville; Warner Bros. Records

Joanna Janét (born in Baton Rouge, Louisiana) is an American country music singer. Janét was signed to DreamWorks Nashville and recorded an album for the label, Destination Love, that was scheduled to be released in August 2002. The first single from the album, "Since I've Seen You Last," peaked at number 55 on the Billboard Hot Country Singles & Tracks chart. When Janét's producer, Paul Worley, left DreamWorks for Warner Bros. Records, she went with him.

== Discography ==
=== Singles ===
Year	Single	Peak positions	Album
Year	Single	US Country	Album
2002	"Since I've Seen You Last"	55	Destination Love (unreleased)
2002	"7 Little Steps"	—	Destination Love (unreleased)

=== Music videos ===
Year	Video	Director
2002	"Since I've Seen You Last"	Kristin Barlowe
