= Workin' Man's Ph.D. =

"Working Man's Ph.D."

Single by Aaron Tippin

from the album Call of the Wild
- B-side: "When Country Took the Throne"
- Released: June 21, 1993
- Recorded: 1993
- Genre: Country
- Length: 3:31
- Label: RCA Nashville
- Songwriters: Aaron Tippin, Philip Douglas, Bobby Boyd
- Producer: Scott Hendricks

Aaron Tippin singles chronology
"My Blue Angel" (1993)	"Working Man's Ph.D." (1993)	"The Call of the Wild" (1993)

"Working Man's Ph.D." is a song co-written and recorded by American country music artist Aaron Tippin. It was released in June 1993 as the lead-off single from his album Call of the Wild. It peaked at number 7 in the United States, and number 6 in Canada. It was written by Tippin, Philip Douglas, and Bobby Boyd.

== Content ==
The song describes the life of a working man with some Pride, Honor, and Dignity.

== Music video ==
The music video was directed by Jon Small.

== Chart positions ==
"Working Man's Ph.D." debuted on the U.S. Billboard Hot Country Singles & Tracks for the week of June 26, 1993.

Chart (1993)	Peak position
Canada Country Singles (RPM)	6
US Hot Country Songs (Billboard)	7

=== Year-end charts ===
Chart (1993)	Position
Canada Country Tracks (RPM)	90
US Country Songs (Billboard)	44
