= That's as Close as I'll Get to Loving You =

Single by Aaron Tippin

from the album Tool Box
- B-side: "She Feels Like a Brand New Man Tonight"
- Released: August 28, 1995
- Genre: Country
- Length: 3:16
- Label: RCA Nashville
- Songwriters: Sally Dworsky, Paul Jefferson, Jan Leyers
- Producer: Steve Gibson

Aaron Tippin singles chronology
"She Feels Like a Brand New Man Tonight" (1995)	"That's as Close as I'll Get to Loving You" (1995)	"Without Your Love" (1996)

"That's as Close as I'll Get to Loving You" is a song recorded by American country music artist Aaron Tippin. It was released in August 1995 as the lead-off single from the album Tool Box. It peaked at number one in the United States, and No. 10 in Canada. Paul Jefferson, who co-wrote the song, later recorded a rendition as the B-side to his 1996 debut single "Check Please." It was written by Sally Dworsky, Jefferson and Jan Leyers.

== Content ==
The song deals with unrequited love and a man's angst as he loves someone from a distance.

== Critical reception ==
Deborah Evans Price, of Billboard magazine reviewed the song favorably, calling it an "eloquent and thoughtful expression of unrequited love." She goes on to say that Gibson's "fine production does justice to the lyric, and Tippin's vocal reflects a broader range and more emotional depth than conveyed on previous outings."

== Music video ==
The music video is entirely in black and white, and it was directed by Michael Salomon. The video peaked at No. 1 on CMT's Top 12 Countdown (now CMT's Top 20 Countdown) in December 1995, around the same time that the song itself was also number one on the Hot Country Songs chart.

== Chart positions ==
"That's as Close as I'll Get to Loving You" debuted at number 72 on the U.S. Billboard Hot Country Singles & Tracks for the week of September 2, 1995.

Chart (1995)	Peak position
Canada Country Singles (RPM)	10
US Bubbling Under Hot 100 (Billboard)	1
US Hot Country Songs (Billboard)	1
