= You've Got to Stand for Something (song) =

Single by Aaron Tippin

from the album You've Got to Stand for Something
- B-side: "Up Against You"
- Released: October 8, 1990
- Genre: Country
- Length: 3:04
- Label: RCA Nashville
- Songwriters: Aaron Tippin, Buddy Brock
- Producer: Emory Gordy Jr.

Aaron Tippin singles chronology
"You've Got to Stand for Something" (1990)	"I Wonder How Far It Is Over You" (1991)

"You've Got to Stand for Something" is a song co-written and recorded by American country music singer Aaron Tippin. It was released in October 1990 as his debut single and the title track to his album You've Got to Stand for Something. It reached the top ten on the country singles chart in early 1991. Tippin wrote the song with Buddy Brock. Charley Pride later recorded the song in 1992 and released it as a single that year.

== Content ==
"You've Got to Stand for Something" is a mid-tempo, exemplifying the patriotic blue collar themes that would show up in many of his later songs as well. In it, the narrator recalls the life lessons taught to him by his father, who told him that he should stand up for his moral convictions.

In 1990, comedian Bob Hope heard Tippin perform the song, and invited Tippin to sing it on his USO tour for soldiers who were serving in the Gulf War at the time.

== Music video ==
This was his first music video and was directed by Bing Sokolsky and premiered in early 1991.

== Chart history ==
Chart (1990–1991)	Peak position
Canada Country Singles (RPM)	13
US Hot Country Songs (Billboard)	6

=== Year-end charts ===
Chart (1991)	Position
US Country Songs (Billboard)	74
