= Buddy Brock =

American songwriter (1952/1953–2025)

- Born: William Calhoun Brock Jr. 1952 or 1953; Greenwood, South Carolina, U.S.
- Origin: Nashville, Tennessee, U.S.
- Died: January 24, 2025 (aged 72) Mount Juliet, Tennessee, U.S.
- Genres: Country
- Occupation: Songwriter
- Years active: 1974–2017

William Calhoun "Buddy" Brock Jr. (1952 or 1953 – January 24, 2025) was an American country music songwriter. His biggest hits include "Watermelon Crawl," co-written with Zack Turner, which reached the #4 spot on the Billboard Hot Country Songs chart and made the Billboard Hot 100 as a dance remix; and the 1992 song "There Ain't Nothin' Wrong with the Radio," co-written and performed by Aaron Tippin, which held the number 1 position on the country chart for three consecutive weeks in April and May, 1992. Other songs written or co-written by Brock include "I Wanna Fall in Love," a #3 country hit co-written with Mark Spiro for Lila McCann; "You've Got to Stand for Something" (co-written with and sung by Tippin), which reached #6 on the Billboard country chart); "Haunted Heart" (co-written with Kim Williams), a #9 country hit for Sammy Kershaw; and "I Wonder How Far It Is Over You" (co-written with and sung by Tippin), a top-40 country hit. Brock died in Mount Juliet, Tennessee, on January 24, 2025, at the age of 72.
