= Michael P. Heeney =

American country music songwriter (born 1955)

- Birth name: Michael Patrick Heeney
- Born: 1955
- Origin: Chicago, Illinois
- Genres: Country
- Occupation: Songwriter
- Years active: 1981–present

Michael Patrick Heeney is an American country music songwriter. He has co-written singles for several country music recording artists, including hit singles for Brooks & Dunn ("God Must Be Busy"), Eric Church ("Love Your Love the Most" and "Drink in My Hand"), George Jones ("Still Doin' Time"), Tracy Byrd ("Ten Rounds with José Cuervo"), and Reba McEntire ("Have I Got a Deal for You")

== Biography ==
Heeney grew up in an Irish neighborhood in Chicago, IL and moved to Nashville in 1974 to pursue a degree in Recording Industry Management at Middle Tennessee State University. Heeney has been a writer at Sony-ATV-Tree since 1995

== Singles ==
Song title	Artist	Co-writers	Peak
"Drink in My Hand"	Eric Church	Eric Church, Luke Laird	1
"Love Your Love the Most"	Eric Church	Eric Church	10
"73 (Everything Changes)"	Jennifer Hanson	Jennifer Hanson, A. Masters	-
"That's the Kind of Love I'm In"	Jace Everett	Casey Beathard	52
"God Must Be Busy"	Brooks & Dunn	Clint Daniels	11
"Ten Rounds with Jose Cuervo"	Tracy Byrd	Casey Beathard, Marla Cannon-Goodman	1
"Take Me with You When You Go"	Tracy Byrd	Casey Beathard, Marla Cannon-Goodman	43
"Dixie Rose Deluxe"	Trent Willmon	Trent Willmon	36
"The Call Of The Wild"	Aaron Tippin	Aaron Tippin, Buddy Brock	17
"Have I Got A Deal For You"	Reba McEntire	Jackson Leap	6
"Still Doin' Time"	George Jones	John E. Moffat	1

== Album Cuts ==
Artist	Song	Album
Alan Jackson	"Gone Before You Met Me"	Angels and Alcohol
Joe Nichols	"Hee Haw"	Crickets
Lee Brice	"Life Off My Years"	Hard 2 Love
Eric Church	"These Boots"	Sinners Like Me
Eric Church	"What I Almost Was"	Sinners Like Me
Eric Church	"The Hard Way"	Sinners Like Me
Kevin Fowler	"Long Neckin' (Makes for Short Memories"	Loose, Loud & Crazy
Tracy Byrd	"How'd I Wind Up in Jamaica"	The Truth About Men
Dusty Drake	"Going on Eighteen"	Dusty Drake
Reba McEntire	"The Great Divide"	Have I Got a Deal for You
Reba McEntire	"I Don't Need Nothin' You Ain't Got"	Have I Got a Deal for You
Reba McEntire	"What You Gonna Do About Me"	The Last One to Know
Aaron Tippin	"I Didn't Come This Far (Just to Walk Away)"	What This Country Needs
Aaron Tippin	"You're the Only Reason for Me"	What This Country Needs
Aaron Tippin	"At the End of the Day"	Stars & Stripes
Aaron Tippin	"She Feels Like a Brand New Man Tonight"	Lookin' Back at Myself
Aaron Tippin	"Every Now and Then (I Wish Then Was Now)"	People Like Us
Aaron Tippin	"How's the Radio Know"	Tool Box
