= The Statler Brothers discography =

- Studio albums: 39
- Live albums: 3
- Compilation albums: 18
- Singles: 83
- Music videos: 14

The discography of American country music group The Statler Brothers consists of 39 studio albums, 18 compilation albums, three live albums, 83 singles, and 14 music videos. The group debuted in 1965 with "Flowers on the Wall", a number two Billboard Hot Country Songs and number four Hot 100 hit. Although they never made top 40 on the Hot 100 again, The Statler Brothers continued to chart on Hot Country Songs through 1990, reaching number one with "Do You Know You Are My Sunshine" in 1978, "Elizabeth" in 1984, and "My Only Love" and "Too Much on My Heart", both in 1985.

All studio albums listed have been issued on compact disc at some point, with the exceptions of Do You Love Me Tonight and Other Favorites, Harold, Lew, Phil and Don, Short Stories, The Originals, and The Legend Goes On. Their first eight Mercury titles (not counting the album released under the Lester "Roadhog" Moran and the Cadillac Cowboys moniker) were made available in a box-set release titled The Complete Original Albums Collection (2012); this marked the first CD appearance of five of those albums.

== Studio albums ==
=== 1960s and 1970s ===
Title	Details	Peak positions			Certifications
Title	Details	US Country	US	CAN Country	Certifications
Flowers on the Wall	Release date: 1966; Label: Columbia	10	125	—	
Sing the Big Hits	Release date: 1967; Label: Columbia	16	—	—	
Oh Happy Day	Release date: 1969; Label: Columbia	—	—	—	
Bed of Rose's	Release date: 1970; Label: Mercury	5	126	—	
Pictures of Moments to Remember	Release date: 1971; Label: Mercury	16	181	—	
Innerview	Release date: 1972; Label: Mercury	12	—	—	
Country Music Then and Now	Release date: 1972; Label: Mercury	7	—	—	
Sing Country Symphonies in E Major	Release date: 1972; Label: Mercury	11	—	—	
Carry Me Back	Release date: 1973; Label: Mercury	11	—	—	
Do You Love Me Tonight and Other Favorites	Release date: 1973; Label: Harmony	—	—	—	
Thank You World	Release date: 1974; Label: Mercury	36	—	—	
Alive at the Johnny Mack Brown High School (as Lester "Roadhog" Moran and the Cadillac Cowboys)	Release date: 1974; Label: Mercury	—	—	—	
Sons of the Motherland	Release date: 1974; Label: Mercury	29	—	—	
Holy Bible Old Testament	Release date: 1975; Label: Mercury	26	—	—	US: Gold
Holy Bible New Testament	Release date: 1975; Label: Mercury	22	—	—	US: Gold
Harold, Lew, Phil, and Don	Release date: 1976; Label: Mercury	21	—	—	
The Country America Loves	Release date: 1977; Label: Mercury	10	—	—	
Short Stories	Release date: 1977; Label: Mercury	21	—	—	
Entertainers...On and Off the Record	Release date: 1978; Label: Mercury	5	155	—	US: Gold
Christmas Card	Release date: 1978; Label: Mercury	17	183	—	US: Platinum
The Originals	Release date: 1979; Label: Mercury	8	183	21	US: Gold
"—" denotes releases that did not chart

=== 1980s ===
Title	Details	Peak positions			Certifications
Title	Details	US Country	US	CAN Country	Certifications
10th Anniversary	Release date: 1980; Label: Mercury	13	169	—	US: Gold
Years Ago	Release date: 1981; Label: Mercury	9	103	—	
The Legend Goes On	Release date: 1982; Label: Mercury	17	201	—	
Today	Release date: 1983; Label: Mercury	10	193	16	US: Gold
Atlanta Blue	Release date: 1984; Label: Mercury	8	177	—	US: Gold
Pardners in Rhyme	Release date: 1985; Label: Mercury	1	—	—	US: Gold
Christmas Present	Release date: 1985; Label: Mercury	42	—	—	
Four for the Show	Release date: 1986; Label: Mercury	7	183	—	
Radio Gospel Favorites	Release date: 1986; Label: Mercury	31	—	—	
Maple Street Memories	Release date: 1987; Label: Mercury	9	—	—	
"—" denotes releases that did not chart

=== 1990s and 2000s ===
Title	Details	Peak positions	Certifications
Title	Details	US Country	Certifications
Music, Memories, and You	Release date: 1990; Label: Mercury	31	
All American Country	Release date: 1991; Label: Mercury	67	
Words and Music	Release date: 1992; Label: Mercury	—	
Gospel Favorites	Release date: 1992; Label: Heartland	—	US: Gold
Home	Release date: 1993; Label: Mercury	—	
The Statler Brothers Sing the Classics	Release date: 1995; Label: Heartland	—	
Showtime	Release date: 2001; Label: Music Box	—	
Amen	Release date: 2002; Label: Yell	—	
"—" denotes releases that did not chart

== Compilation albums ==
Title	Details	Peak positions		Certifications
Title	Details	US Country	US	Certifications
The World of the Statler Brothers	Release date: 1973; Label: Columbia	—	—	
The Best of the Statler Bros.	Release date: 1975; Label: Mercury	2	121	US: 3× Platinum; CAN: Gold
Holy Bible: The Old and New Testaments	Release date: 1978; Label: Mercury	44	—	
The Best of the Statler Bros. Rides Again, Vol. II	Release date: 1979; Label: Mercury	4	—	US: Gold
The Statlers' Greatest Hits	Release date: 1988; Label: Mercury	21	—	
30th Anniversary Celebration	Release date: 1994; Label: Mercury	—	—	
The Complete Lester "Roadhog" Moran & The Cadillac Cowboys	Release date: 1994; Label: Mercury	—	—	
Legendary Country Singers	Release date: 1995; Label: Time Life Music	—	—	
The Essential Statler Brothers	Release date: 1997; Label: Columbia	—	—	
The Gospel Spirit	Release date: August 24, 2004; Label: Mercury Nashville	—	—	
20th Century Masters – The Christmas Collection: The Best of the Statler Brothers	Release date: September 21, 2004; Label: Mercury Nashville	—	—	
The Definitive Collection	Release date: April 19, 2005; Label: Mercury Nashville	—	—	
Gold	Release date: January 10, 2006; Label: Mercury Nashville	—	—	
The Gospel Music of the Statler Brothers Volume 1	Release date: May 18, 2010; Label: Gaither Music Group	16	113	
The Gospel Music of the Statler Brothers Volume 2	Release date: May 18, 2010; Label: Gaither Music Group	17	116	
Icon	Release date: November 2, 2010; Label: Mercury Nashville	—	—	
The Complete Original Albums Collection	Release date: 2012; Label: Reader's Digest Music	—	—	
The Complete Mercury Christmas Recordings	Release date: November 4, 2014; Label: Real Gone Music	—	—	
"—" denotes releases that did not chart

== Live albums ==
Title	Details	Peak positions	
Title	Details	US Country	US
Live and Sold Out	Release date: 1989; Label: Mercury	40	—
Farewell Concert	Release date: 2003; Label: Compendia	—	—
Best from the Farewell Concert	Release date: 2013; Label: Gaither Music Group	24	145
"—" denotes releases that did not chart

== Singles ==
=== 1960s ===
Year	Single	Peak positions			Album
Year	Single	US Country	US	CAN	Album
1964	"The Wreck of the Old 97"	—	—	—	The Essential Statler Brothers
1964	"I Still Miss Someone"	—	—	—	Flowers on the Wall
1965	"Flowers on the Wall"	2	4	1	Flowers on the Wall
1965	"My Darling Hildegard"	—	110	58	Flowers on the Wall
1966	"Green Grass" (Note: "Green Grass" was quickly withdrawn at the request of the song's publisher to make way for Gary Lewis' recording. The single was reissued with the same catalog number (Columbia 4-43624), but with "The Right One" replacing the song in question.)	—	—	—	Do You Love Me Tonight and Other Favorites
1966	"The Right One"	30	—	—	Do You Love Me Tonight and Other Favorites
1966	"That'll Be the Day"	37	—	—	Do You Love Me Tonight and Other Favorites
1967	"Ruthless"	10	—	—	Sing the Big Hits
1967	"You Can't Have Your Kate and Edith, Too"	10	—	—	Sing the Big Hits
1968	"Jump for Joy"	60	—	—	The Essential Statler Brothers
1968	"Sissy"	75	—	—	The Essential Statler Brothers
1969	"I'm the Boy"	60	—	—	Do You Love Me Tonight and Other Favorites
1969	"Oh Happy Day"	—	—	—	Oh Happy Day
"—" denotes releases that did not chart

=== 1970s ===
Year	Single	Peak positions					Album
Year	Single	US Country	US	US AC	CAN Country	CAN	Album
1970	"Bed of Rose's"	9	58	—	3	86	Bed of Rose's
1971	"New York City"	19	—	—	34	—	Bed of Rose's
1971	"Pictures"	13	—	—	27	—	Pictures of Moments to Remember
1971	"You Can't Go Home"	23	—	—	36	—	Pictures of Moments to Remember
1972	"Do You Remember These"	2	105	18	—	—	Innerview
1972	"The Class of '57"	6	—	—	3	—	Country Music Then and Now
1973	"Monday Morning Secretary"	20	—	—	10	—	Sing Country Symphonies in E Major
1973	"Woman Without a Home"	29	—	—	22	—	Sing Country Symphonies in E Major
1973	"Carry Me Back"	26	—	—	9	—	Carry Me Back
1974	"Whatever Happened to Randolph Scott"	22	—	—	32	—	Carry Me Back
1974	"Thank You World"	31	—	—	45	—	Thank You World
1974	"Susan When She Tried"	15	—	—	18	—	Sons of the Motherland
1975	"All American Girl"	31	—	—	36	—	Sons of the Motherland
1975	"I'll Go to My Grave Loving You"	3	93	—	1	—	The Best of the Statler Bros.
1976	"How Great Thou Art"	39	—	—	29	—	Holy Bible New Testament
1976	"Your Picture in the Paper"	13	—	—	19	—	Harold, Lew, Phil, and Don
1976	"Thank God I've Got You"	10	—	—	—	—	The Country America Loves
1977	"The Movies"	10	—	—	15	—	The Country America Loves
1977	"I Was There"	8	—	—	8	—	The Country America Loves
1977	"Silver Medals and Sweet Memories"	18	—	—	10	—	Short Stories
1977	"Some I Wrote"	17	—	—	45	—	Short Stories
1978	"Do You Know You Are My Sunshine"	1	—	—	5	—	Entertainers...On and Off the Record
1978	"Who Am I to Say"	3	—	—	60	—	Entertainers...On and Off the Record
1978	"The Official Historian on Shirley Jean Berrell"	5	—	—	7	—	Entertainers...On and Off the Record
1978	"I Believe in Santa's Cause"	—	—	—	—	—	Christmas Card
1979	"How to Be a Country Star"	7	—	—	18	—	The Originals
1979	"Here We Are Again"	11	—	—	28	—	The Originals
1979	"Nothing as Original as You"	10	—	—	33	—	The Originals
"—" denotes releases that did not chart

=== 1980s ===
Year	Single	Peak positions		Album
Year	Single	US Country	CAN Country	Album
1980	"(I'll Even Love You) Better Than I Did Then"	8	8	The Best of the Statler Bros. Rides Again, Vol. II
1980	"Charlotte's Web"	5	27	10th Anniversary
1980	"Don't Forget Yourself"	13	—	10th Anniversary
1981	"In the Garden"	35	—	Years Ago
1981	"Don't Wait on Me"	5	36	Years Ago
1981	"Years Ago"	12	—	Years Ago
1982	"You'll Be Back (Every Night in My Dreams)"	3	—	Years Ago
1982	"Whatever"	7	13	The Legend Goes On
1982	"A Child of the Fifties"	17	—	The Legend Goes On
1983	"Oh Baby Mine (I Get So Lonely)"	2	26	Today
1983	"Guilty"	9	16	Today
1983	"Elizabeth"	1	12	Today
1984	"Atlanta Blue"	3	2	Atlanta Blue
1984	"One Takes the Blame"	8	20	Atlanta Blue
1984	"My Only Love"	1	3	Atlanta Blue
1985	"Hello Mary Lou"	3	3	Pardners in Rhyme
1985	"Too Much on My Heart"	1	1	Pardners in Rhyme
1985	"Christmas Eve (Kodia's Theme)"	—	—	Christmas Present
1986	"Sweeter and Sweeter"	8	34	Pardners in Rhyme
1986	"Count On Me"	5	4	Four for the Show
1986	"Only You"	36	—	Four for the Show
1986	"Forever"	7	11	Four for the Show
1987	"I'll Be the One"	10	24	Maple Street Memories
1987	"Maple Street Mem'ries"	42	—	Maple Street Memories
1988	"The Best I Know How"	15	33	Maple Street Memories
1988	"Am I Crazy?"	27	—	Maple Street Memories
1988	"Let's Get Started If We're Gonna Break My Heart"	12	24	The Statlers' Greatest Hits
1989	"Moon Pretty Moon"	36	58	The Statlers' Greatest Hits
1989	"More Than a Name on a Wall"	6	13	The Statlers' Greatest Hits
1989	"Don't Wait on Me" (Live)	67	—	Live and Sold Out
1989	"A Hurt I Can't Handle"	56	64	Live and Sold Out
"—" denotes releases that did not chart

=== 1990s and 2000s ===
Year	Single	Peak positions		Album
Year	Single	US Country	CAN Country	Album
1990	"Walking Heartache in Disguise"	— (Note: "Walking Heartache in Disguise" did not chart on Hot Country Songs, but peaked at No. 8 on Hot Country Radio Breakouts.)	—	Live and Sold Out
1990	"Small Small World"	54	36	Music, Memories and You
1990	"Nobody Else"	—	—	Music, Memories and You
1991	"Remember Me"	—	—	All American Country
1991	"You've Been Like a Mother to Me"	—	—	All American Country
1991	"There's Still Times"	—	—	All American Country
1991	"Put It on the Card"	—	—	All American Country
1992	"Nobody Loves Here Anymore"	—	—	Words and Music
1992	"Same Way Everytime"	—	—	Words and Music
1993	"What We Love to Do"	—	—	Home
2001	"It Should Have Been Me"	—	—	Showtime
"—" denotes releases that did not chart

== Music videos ==
Year	Song title	Director
1982	"Whatever"	
1983	"Guilty"	
1984	"Elizabeth"	
1984	"Atlanta Blue"	Marc Ball
1985	"My Only Love"	Jim Owens
1985	"Sweeter and Sweeter"	
1985	"Christmas Eve (Kodia's Theme)"	
1986	"Only You"	Billy Galvin
1987	"Maple Street Mem'ries"	
1988	"Let's Get Started If We're Gonna Break My Heart"	Michael Salomon
1990	"Small, Small World"	Deaton Flanigen
1990	"Nobody Else"	
1991	"You've Been Like a Mother to Me"	
1993	"What We Love to Do"	

== See also ==
- Jimmy Fortune
- Lew DeWitt
