= 1978 in country music =

This is a list of notable events in country music that took place in the year 1978.

== Events ==
- March 4 — The Public Broadcasting System (PBS) telecasts the first complete Grand Ole Opry show from the new Grand Ole Opry House as it happened from 6–9 pm. The show featured Del Reeves, The Willis Brothers, Billy Grammer, Lonzo and Oscar, Bill Monroe, Porter Wagoner, Roy Acuff, The Crook Brothers, The Fruit Jar Drinkers, Ronnie Milsap, Grandpa Jones, George Hamilton IV and others. The show would run over about 18 minutes the first night. The telecast would repeat from 1979 to 1981.
- March 25 — "Mamas Don't Let Your Babies Grow Up to Be Cowboys" by Waylon Jennings and Willie Nelson becomes the last song for 12 years to spend four weeks at No. 1 on Billboard's Hot Country Singles chart. There wouldn't be another four-week No. 1 until "Hard Rock Bottom of Your Heart" by Randy Travis in April 1990. The trend of fewer (and shorter) multi-week runs at No. 1 on Billboard, even for the year's biggest hits, is the result of changes in radio programming and the magazine's reporting methods.
- May 6 — Bob Kingsley takes over hosting duties of "American Country Countdown," a stint that will last 27 years. He had been a producer of the radio countdown show since 1974.
- May 24 — The United States Postal Service issues a 13-cent commemorative stamp honoring Jimmie Rodgers, one of the genre's pioneers. The Rodgers stamp, designed by artist Jim Sharpe, is the first in the Postal Service's long-running Performing Arts Series.
- September — The Donna Fargo Show premieres in television syndication. The new show's debut comes around the same time Fargo was diagnosed with multiple sclerosis. She receives successful medical treatment and with her husband's help, makes it back to excellent health.
- October 4 — One of Nashville's most mysterious crimes involves the reported abduction and beating of Tammy Wynette. Media reports said that Wynette had been abducted by a masked man at a shopping center before the beating. No suspects were ever named or arrested. While Wynette would insist the story was true, her daughter raised doubts, claiming the incident was fabricated to cover physical abuse from her newlywed husband, songwriter/producer George Richey.
- October 21 — Fans of Mel Street are saddened when the honky tonk-styled singer, who had long battled clinical depression and alcoholism, committed suicide on his 43rd birthday. He had signed a recording contract with Mercury Records earlier in the year.

== Top hits of the year ==
=== Number one hits ===
==== United States ====
(as certified by Billboard)

Date	Single Name	Artist	Wks. No.1	CAN peak	Spec. Note
January 7	Take This Job and Shove It	Johnny Paycheck	2		^{[C]}
January 21	What a Difference You've Made in My Life	Ronnie Milsap	1
January 28	Out of My Head and Back in My Bed	Loretta Lynn	2		^{[B]}
February 11	I Just Wish You Were Someone I Love	Larry Gatlin	1	3	^{[A]}
February 18	Don't Break the Heart That Loves You	Margo Smith	2	5	^{[A]}
March 4	Mammas Don't Let Your Babies; Grow Up to Be Cowboys	Waylon Jennings and Willie Nelson	4		^{[1]}
April 1	Ready for the Times to Get Better	Crystal Gayle	1
April 8	Someone Loves You Honey	Charley Pride	2
April 22	Every Time Two Fools Collide	Kenny Rogers and Dottie West	2		^{[A] – Dottie West}
May 6	It's All Wrong, But It's All Right	Dolly Parton	2
May 20	She Can Put Her Shoes Under My Bed (Anytime)	Johnny Duncan	1		^{[B]}
May 27	Do You Know You Are My Sunshine	The Statler Brothers	2	5	^{[A]}
June 10	Georgia on My Mind	Willie Nelson	1
June 17	Two More Bottles of Wine	Emmylou Harris	1
June 24	I'll Be True to You	The Oak Ridge Boys	1	8	^{[A]}
July 1	It Only Hurts for a Little While	Margo Smith	1		^{[B]}
July 8	I Believe in You	Mel Tillis	1
July 15	Only One Love in My Life	Ronnie Milsap	3
August 5	Love or Something Like It	Kenny Rogers	1
August 12	You Don't Love Me Anymore	Eddie Rabbitt	1	3
August 19	Talking in Your Sleep	Crystal Gayle	2
September 2	Blue Skies	Willie Nelson	1
September 9	I've Always Been Crazy	Waylon Jennings	3
September 30	Heartbreaker	Dolly Parton	3
October 21	Tear Time	Dave & Sugar	1	3
October 28	Let's Take the Long Way Around the World	Ronnie Milsap	1
November 4	Sleeping Single In a Double Bed	Barbara Mandrell	3		^{[A]}
November 25	Sweet Desire/Old Fashioned Love	The Kendalls	1	2
December 2	I Just Want to Love You	Eddie Rabbitt	1	2
December 9	On My Knees	Charlie Rich and Janie Fricke	1	2	^{[B] – Charlie Rich}^{[A] – Janie Fricke}
December 16	The Gambler	Kenny Rogers	3	2

Notes

- 1 No. 1 song of the year, as determined by Billboard.
- A First Billboard No. 1 hit for that artist.
- B Last Billboard No. 1 hit for that artist.
- C Only Billboard No. 1 hit for that artist to date.

==== Canada ====
(as certified by RPM)

Date	Single Name	Artist	Wks. No.1	U.S. peak	Spec. Note
January 14	Take This Job and Shove It	Johnny Paycheck	1		^{[C]}
January 21	My Way	Elvis Presley	2	2
February 4	What a Difference You've Made in My Life	Ronnie Milsap	2
February 18	Out of My Head and Back in My Bed	Loretta Lynn	1		^{[B]}
February 25	You're the One	The Oak Ridge Boys	2	2	^{[A]}
March 11	To Daddy	Emmylou Harris	1	3
March 18	Mammas Don't Let Your Babies Grow Up to Be Cowboys	Waylon Jennings and Willie Nelson	3		^{[A] – Willie Nelson}
April 8	I Might as Well Believe (I'll Live Forever)	Carroll Baker	1	—
April 15	Do I Love You (Yes in Every Way)	Donna Fargo	1	2	^{[B]}
April 22	Ready for the Times to Get Better	Crystal Gayle	1
April 29	Someone Loves You Honey	Charley Pride	2
May 13	Every Time Two Fools Collide	Kenny Rogers and Dottie West	1
May 20	It's All Wrong, But It's All Right	Dolly Parton	1
May 27	She Can Put Her Shoes Under my Bed (Anytime)	Johnny Duncan	1		^{[B]}
June 3	Georgia on My Mind	Willie Nelson	2
June 17	Night Time Magic	Larry Gatlin	1	2	^{[A]}
June 24	Two More Bottles of Wine	Emmylou Harris	1
July 1	I Can't Wait Any Longer	Bill Anderson	2	4	^{[B]}
July 15	Portrait in the Window	Carroll Baker	1	—	^{[1]}
July 22	It Only Hurts for a Little While	Margo Smith	1		^{[C]}
July 29	I Believe in You	Mel Tillis	1
August 5	You Needed Me	Anne Murray	1	4
August 12	Homefolks	Bob Murphy & Big Buffalo	1	—	^{[C]}
August 19	Love or Something Like It	Kenny Rogers	1
August 26	Only One Love in My Life	Ronnie Milsap	1
September 2	Talking in Your Sleep	Crystal Gayle	1
September 9	When I Stop Leaving (I'll Be Gone)	Charley Pride	1	3
September 16	Boogie Grass Band	Conway Twitty	1	2
September 23	Blue Skies	Willie Nelson	1
September 30	I've Always Been Crazy	Waylon Jennings	1
October 7	Heartbreaker	Dolly Parton	3
October 28	It's Been a Great Afternoon	Merle Haggard	1	2	RPM didn't publish on November 4 or November 11.
November 18	Let's Take the Long Way Around the World	Ronnie Milsap	1
November 25	Cryin' Again	The Oak Ridge Boys	1	3
December 2	Sleeping Single In a Double Bed	Barbara Mandrell	2		^{[A]}
December 16	That's What You Do to Me	Charly McClain	1	8	^{[A]}
December 23	Hooked on a Feeling	Carroll Baker	2	—

Notes

- 1 No. 1 song of the year, as determined by RPM.
- A First RPM No. 1 hit for that artist.
- B Last RPM No. 1 hit for that artist.
- C Only RPM No. 1 hit for that artist.

=== Other major hits ===
==== Singles released by American artists ====
US	CAN	Single	Artist
16	12	'57 Chevrolet	Billie Jo Spears
4	2	Ain't No California	Mel Tillis
3	4	All of Me	Willie Nelson
21	10	Another Fine Mess	Glen Campbell
10	8	Another Goodbye	Donna Fargo
2	10	Anyone Who Isn't Me Tonight	Kenny Rogers and Dottie West
21	19	Baby It's You	Janie Fricke
20	—	Baby, Last Night Made My Day	Susie Allanson
17	13	Back to the Love	Susie Allanson
6	8	Bartender's Blues	George Jones
36	16	Be Your Own Best Friend	Ray Stevens
10	2	Beautiful Woman	Charlie Rich
18	—	Bedroom Eyes	Don Drumm
20	34	Better Me	Tommy Overstreet
13	17	Break My Mind	Vern Gosdin
13	12	Bucket to the South	Ava Barber
8	25	The Bull and the Beaver	Merle Haggard and Leona Williams
16	18	Can You Fool	Glen Campbell
18	20	Caribbean	Sonny James
4	2	Come a Little Bit Closer	Johnny Duncan and Janie Fricke
10	44	Come on In	Jerry Lee Lewis
17	28	Come See Me and Come Lonely	Dottie West
16	9	Come to Me	Roy Head
23	16	Country Lovin'	Eddy Arnold
11	14	Cowboys Don't Get Lucky All the Time	Gene Watson
20	16	Danger Heartbreak Ahead	Zella Lehr
7	9	Daylight	T. G. Sheppard
13	3	Do It Again Tonight	Larry Gatlin
13	18	Don't Ever Say Goodbye	T. G. Sheppard
12	5	Easy From Now On	Emmylou Harris
11	18	Fadin' In, Fadin' Out	Tommy Overstreet
20	36	Four Little Letters	Stella Parton
10	15	The First Time	Billy "Crash" Craddock
7	8	Friend, Lover, Wife	Johnny Paycheck
6	2	From Seven Till Ten	Loretta Lynn and Conway Twitty
17	6	Georgia in a Jug	Johnny Paycheck
11	12	God Made Love	Mel McDaniel
4	9	Gotta Quit Lookin' at You Baby	Dave & Sugar
16	12	Grandest Lady of Them All	Conway Twitty
19	—	Handcuffed to a Heartache	Mary K. Miller
2	9	Hearts on Fire	Eddie Rabbitt
4	7	Hello Mexico (And Adios Baby to You)	Johnny Duncan
9	43	Here Comes the Hurt Again	Mickey Gilley
15	26	Here Comes the Reason I Live	Ronnie McDowell
20	—	Here in Love	Dottsy
20	33	High and Dry	Joe Sun
20	14	Hopelessly Devoted to You	Olivia Newton-John
22	6	How Can I Leave You Again	John Denver
14	14	Hubba Hubba	Billy "Crash" Craddock
4	4	I Cheated on a Good Woman's Love	Billy "Crash" Craddock
8	4	I Don't Need a Thing at All	Gene Watson
15	6	I Fought the Law	Hank Williams Jr.
14	23	I Just Want to Be Your Everything	Connie Smith
5	5	I Love You, I Love You, I Love You	Ronnie McDowell
10	7	I Love You (What Can I Say)	Jerry Reed
18	17	I Promised Her a Rainbow	Bobby Borchers
8	16	I Never Will Marry	Linda Ronstadt
13	29	I Wish I Loved Somebody Else	Tom T. Hall
12	23	I Would Like to See You Again	Johnny Cash
10	—	I'll Find It Where I Can	Jerry Lee Lewis
11	41	I'll Just Take It Out in Love	George Jones
11	27	I'll Never Be Free	Jim Ed Brown and Helen Cornelius
2	2	I'm Always on a Mountain When I Fall	Merle Haggard
10	—	I'm Gonna Love You Anyway	Cristy Lane
26	20	I'm Leaving It All Up to You	Freddy Fender
7	10	I've Got a Winner in You	Don Williams
17	26	I've Got to Go	Billie Jo Spears
9	—	If I Had a Cheating Heart	Mel Street
6	7	If the World Ran Out of Love Tonight	Jim Ed Brown and Helen Cornelius
5	5	If You Can Touch Her at All	Willie Nelson
6	9	If You've Got Ten Minutes (Let's Fall in Love)	Joe Stampley
2	2	It Don't Feel Like Sinnin' to Me	The Kendalls
10	2	It's a Heartache	Bonnie Tyler
13	19	Let Me Be Your Baby	Charly McClain
9	—	Let's Shake Hands and Come Out Lovin'	Kenny O'Dell
3	6	Little Things Mean a Lot	Margo Smith
18	9	Lonely Hearts Club	Billie Jo Spears
8	14	Lonely Street	Rex Allen, Jr.
26	19	Love, Love, Love	Sandy Posey
7	13	Love Me with All Your Heart (Cuando Caliente El Sol)	Johnny Rodriguez
3	6	A Lover's Question	Jacky Ward
13	5	May the Force Be with You Always	Tom T. Hall
7	14	Maybe Baby	Susie Allanson
4	3	Middle Age Crazy	Jerry Lee Lewis
13	27	Mister D.J.	T. G. Sheppard
9	30	Never My Love	Vern Gosdin
8	4	No, No, No (I'd Rather Be Free)	Rex Allen, Jr.
10	18	No Sleep Tonight	Randy Barlow
19	—	Now You See 'Em, Now You Don't	Roy Head
14	29	Old Flames Can't Hold a Candle to You	Joe Sun
8	6	One Sided Conversation	Gene Watson
7	4	Penny Arcade	Cristy Lane
6	28	Pittsburgh Stealers	The Kendalls
17	17	Please Don't Play a Love Song	Marty Robbins
12	4	Please Help Me, I'm Falling (in Love with You)	Janie Fricke
8	7	The Power of Positive Drinkin'	Mickey Gilley
8	3	Puttin' in Overtime at Home	Charlie Rich
19	21	Ragamuffin Man	Donna Fargo
3	2	Rake and Ramblin' Man	Don Williams
17	—	Red Hot Memory	Kenny Dale
6	7	Red Wine and Blue Memories	Joe Stampley
6	8	Return to Me	Marty Robbins
11	9	Rhythm of the Rain	Jacky Ward
5	6	Rose Colored Glasses	John Conlee
12	10	Running Kind	Merle Haggard
16	28	Shake Me I Rattle	Cristy Lane
13	14	Shine on Me (The Sun Still Shines When It Rains)	John Wesley Ryles
11	8	Sleep Tight Good Night Man	Bobby Bare
19	75	Slippin' Away	The Bellamy Brothers
10	—	Slow and Easy	Randy Barlow
13	15	Soft Lights and Hard Country Music	Moe Bandy
17	45	Some I Wrote	The Statler Brothers
9	15	Something to Brag About	Mary Kay Place and Willie Nelson
12	10	Spring Fever	Loretta Lynn
14	20	Standard Lie Number One	Stella Parton
16	—	Starting All Over Again	Don Gibson
20	25	Sweet Fantasy	Bobby Borchers
8	6	Sweet, Sweet Smile	The Carpenters
13	10	Talk to Me	Freddy Fender
11	10	That's What Makes the Juke Box Play	Moe Bandy
2	5	There Ain't No Good Chain Gang	Johnny Cash and Waylon Jennings
18	—	Things I Do for You	Mundo Earwood
18	10	Think About Me	Freddy Fender
16	37	This Is the Love	Sonny James
20	—	Three Sheets in the Wind	Jacky Ward and Reba McEntire
5	25	Tonight	Barbara Mandrell
28	17	Tonight's the Night (Gonna Be Alright)	Roy Head
29	15	Too Many Nights Alone	Bobby Bare
7	5	Two Doors Down	Zella Lehr
18	31	Two Hearts Tangled in Love	Kenny Dale
7	4	Two Lonely People	Moe Bandy
6	6	Unchained Melody	Elvis Presley
7	12	We Believe in Happy Endings	Johnny Rodriguez
2	4	We Belong Together	Susie Allanson
26	17	We Got Love	Lynn Anderson
10	6	We've Come a Long Way Baby	Loretta Lynn
13	28	Week-End Friend	Con Hunley
4	2	What Did I Promise Her Last Night	Mel Tillis
9	14	What Have You Got to Lose	Tom T. Hall
9	20	What Time Do You Have to Be Back to Heaven	Razzy Bailey
5	29	When Can We Do This Again	T. G. Sheppard
16	5	Whiskey Trip	Gary Stewart
3	60	Who Am I to Say	The Statler Brothers
10	7	With Love	Rex Allen, Jr.
4	5	Woman to Woman	Barbara Mandrell
3	3	Womanhood	Tammy Wynette
12	15	Yes Ma'am	Tommy Overstreet
20	35	You Know What	Jerry Reed and Seidina
14	20	You've Still Got a Place in My Heart	Con Hunley

==== Singles released by Canadian artists ====
US	CAN	Single	Artist
—	11	All Cried Out	Van Dyke
—	19	Caribou to Nashville	Gary Fjellgaard
92	9	The Circle Is Small (I Can See It in Your Eyes)	Gordon Lightfoot
—	10	Comin' on Stronger	Mercey Brothers
—	12	Does the Rain Only Fall on My Mansion	Jerry Palmer
—	7	Dream Maker	Sheila Ann
—	9	The Fastest Gun	Dallas Harms
—	12	George the Hermit	Jack Hennig
—	14	Goin' Home	Burton & Honeyman
—	4	Here's Your Watch John	Canadian Zephyr
—	14	Hold Me Like a Baby	Tim Daniels
—	10	Living in the Best of Two Worlds	Rondini
—	6	Love Is a Contact Sport	Family Brown
—	18	Master of the Classical Guitar	Dallas Harms
—	18	Mindy	Jack Hennig
—	16	My Good Woman	Dick Damron
—	14	Ol' Amos	Orval Prophet
—	16	Riding High	Van Dyke
—	18	Sun Always Shines	Laura Vinson
—	14	There's More Love Where That Came From	Joyce Seamone
—	16	Truck Driver's Girl	The Good Brothers
4	2	Walk Right Back	Anne Murray
—	19	Where Have All the Cowboy Songs Gone	Orval Prophet
—	9	Whiskey Jack	Dick Damron
—	3	You're the Light	Family Brown

== Top new album releases ==
Album	Artist	Record Label
Burgers and Fries/When I Stop Leaving (I'll Be Gone)	Charley Pride	RCA
Dark Eyed Lady	Donna Fargo	Warner Bros.
The Gambler	Kenny Rogers	United Artists
Heartbreaker	Dolly Parton	RCA
I've Always Been Crazy	Waylon Jennings	RCA
I've Cried the Blue Right Out of My Eyes	Crystal Gayle	MCA^{1}
Night Time Magic	Larry Gatlin	Monument
Quarter Moon in a Ten Cent Town	Emmylou Harris	Warner/Reprise
Stardust	Willie Nelson	Columbia/CBS
Someone Loves You Honey	Charley Pride	RCA
TG	T. G. Sheppard	Warner Bros./Curb
TNT	Tanya Tucker	MCA
Waylon & Willie	Waylon Jennings and Willie Nelson	RCA
When I Dream	Crystal Gayle	United Artists

^{1} A collection of Crystal Gayle's earliest recordings from the early 1970s.

=== Other albums ===
Album	Artist	Record Label
Ain't Living Long Like This	Rodney Crowell	Warner Bros.
Bartender's Blues	George Jones	Epic/CBS
Billy "Crash" Craddock	Billy "Crash" Craddock	Capitol
Country Soul	Mel Street	Polydor/Polygram
Don't Break the Heart That Loves You	Margo Smith	Warner Bros.
Entertainers On and Off the Record	Statler Brothers	Mercury/Polygram
Every Time Two Fools Collide	Kenny Rogers and Dottie West	United Artists
Expressions	Don Williams	ABC/Dot
I Still Believe in Love	Charlie Rich	United Artists
Lonely Hearts Club	Billie Jo Spears	United Artists
Love Lies	Cristy Lane	LS
Love's Ups and Downs	Barbara Mandrell	ABC/Dot
A Lover's Question	Jacky Ward	Mercury/Polygram
Only One Love in My Life	Ronnie Milsap	RCA
Oh Brother!	Larry Gatlin	Monument
Let's Keep It That Way	Anne Murray	Capitol
Love...& Other Sad Stories	Bill Anderson	MCA
Love or Something Like It	Kenny Rogers	United Artists
Room Service	Oak Ridge Boys	ABC/Dot
Rose Colored Glasses	John Conlee	ABC/Dot
She Can Put Her Shoes Under My Bed (Anytime)	Johnny Duncan	Columbia/CBS
Stella Parton	Stella Parton	Elektra
Tear Time	Dave & Sugar	RCA
Variations	Eddie Rabbitt	Elektra
White Mansions	Waylon Jennings	RCA

=== Christmas albums ===
- Christmas Card – Statler Brothers (Mercury/Polygram)

== Births ==
- February 25 — Shawna Thompson, of Thompson Square.
- April 15 — Chris Stapleton, male vocalist who helped revive the blues-soul sound of country music in the 2010s, most notably with the album Traveller.
- June 13 – Jason Michael Carroll, late 2000s-to-early 2010s male vocalist best known for "Alyssa Lies."
- July 21 — Brad Mates, lead singer of Canadian band Emerson Drive.
- July 31 — Zac Brown, lead singer of his eponymously named band, who began having hits in the late 2000s.
- August 8 — Gary Nichols, country music singer
- September 14 — Danielle Peck, up-and-coming country music star

== Deaths ==
- June 12 — Johnny Bond, 63, singer of the 1940s through 1960s, best known for his novelty songs about drunkenness (heart attack).
- October 21 — Mel Street, 43, honky tonk-styled artist and one of the most promising new artists of the 1970s (suicide).
- October 23 — Maybelle Carter, 69, singer and songwriter of the Carter Family and mother of Anita, Helen and June Carter Cash.
- December 16 — Jenny Lou Carson, 63, first female to write a #1 country hit ("You Two-Timed Me One Time Too Often").

== Country Music Hall of Fame Inductees ==
- Grandpa Jones (1913–1998)

== Major awards ==
=== Grammy Awards ===
- Best Female Country Vocal Performance — "Here You Come Again", Dolly Parton
- Best Male Country Vocal Performance — "Georgia on My Mind", Willie Nelson
- Best Country Performance by a Duo or Group with Vocal — "Mamas Don't Let Your Babies Grow Up to Be Cowboys", Waylon Jennings and Willie Nelson
- Best Country Instrumental Performance — "One O'Clock Jump", Asleep at the Wheel
- Best Country Song — "The Gambler", Don Schlitz (Performer: Kenny Rogers)

=== Juno Awards ===
- Country Male Vocalist of the Year — Ronnie Prophet
- Country Female Vocalist of the Year — Carroll Baker
- Country Group or Duo of the Year — The Good Brothers

=== Academy of Country Music ===
- Entertainer of the Year — Kenny Rogers
- Song of the Year — "You Needed Me", Randy Goodrum (Performer: Anne Murray)
- Single of the Year — "Tulsa Time", Don Williams
- Album of the Year — Y'all Come Back Saloon, The Oak Ridge Boys
- Top Male Vocalist — Kenny Rogers
- Top Female Vocalist — Barbara Mandrell
- Top Vocal Group — The Oak Ridge Boys
- Top New Male Vocalist — John Conlee
- Top New Female Vocalist — Cristy Lane

=== Country Music Association ===
- Entertainer of the Year — Dolly Parton
- Song of the Year — "Don't It Make My Brown Eyes Blue", Richard Leigh (Performer: Crystal Gayle)
- Single of the Year — "Heaven's Just a Sin Away", The Kendalls
- Album of the Year — It Was Almost Like a Song, Ronnie Milsap
- Male Vocalist of the Year — Don Williams
- Female Vocalist of the Year — Crystal Gayle
- Vocal Duo of the Year — Kenny Rogers and Dottie West
- Vocal Group of the Year — The Oak Ridge Boys
- Instrumentalist of the Year — Roy Clark
- Instrumental Group of the Year — The Oak Ridge Boys Band

=== Hollywood walk of Fame ===
Country stars who got a star in 1978

Loretta Lynn

== Other links ==
- Country Music Association
- Inductees of the Country Music Hall of Fame
