= Pauline Alpert =

American pianist (1905–1988)

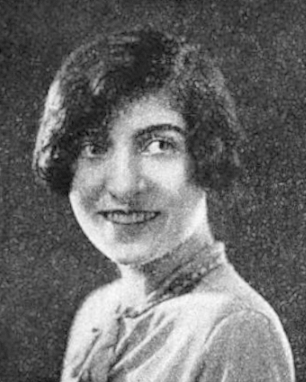
- In the Duo-Art Music Bulletin, June 1928
- Born: Pauline Edeth Alpert; December 27, 1905; Rochester, New York, US
- Died: April 6, 1988 (aged 82); New York City, US
- Occupation: Pianist
- Spouse: Sidney Rooff (m. 1940)

Pauline Edeth Alpert Rooff (December 27, 1905 – April 6, 1988) was a pianist who performed, composed, recorded, and produced Duo-Art piano rolls in the United States. Known by her fans as the "Whirlwind Pianist", she performed in several films and made recordings with a few record labels. She did radio shows in New York City and toured.

== Career ==
She made numerous Victor Records recordings. She recorded the album Sparkling Piano Melodies on Sonora Records. She sometimes recorded under the pseudonym Peggy Anderson. She produced more than 500 piano rolls for the Duo-Art. She toured across the United States, Canada, and South America. She played in the White House three times, performing for Franklin D. Roosevelt and Harry S. Truman.

She performed during the intermission of the Broadway show Rufus LeMaire's Affairs in 1927. She featured in two Vitaphone Varieties short film episodes dated March 1927. This included What Price Piano, a collection of popular songs. She later performed in 1935 in the Vitaphone Varieties short film Katz' Pajamas with Fifi D'Orsay, directed by Joseph Henabery.

The collection Pauline Alpert's folio of modern piano songs includes her compositions:

- "Night of Romance" (1927)
- "Perils of Pauline" (1927)
- "Dream of a Doll" (1934)
- "March of the Blues" (1935)
- "Piano Poker" (1935)
- "The Merry Minnow" (1935)
- "Ivory Tips" (1937)

Her later compositions include A Million Stars Just Can't Be Wrong (1937), Mindin' the Baby (1938), A Happy New Year to Love (1938), and Tut Tut (1944).

She performed for NBC and CBS, including in guest solo spots with Paul Whiteman, Rudy Vallée, and Fred Allen. She had her own semi-weekly program for the WOR Radio Network in New York City.

A recording of her playing Doll Dance is on the 1981 album Ragtime Piano Novelties of the 20's.

== Discography ==
Pauline's known discography is listed below.

| Year | Title | Composer | Matrix number |
|---|---|---|---|
| 1926 | Valencia | José Padilla | Victor Trial 12-14-01 |
| 1926 | When You and I Were Young, Maggie | George W. Johnson, James Austin Butterfield | Victor Trial 12-14-02 |
| 1927 | Tonight You Belong to Me | Lee David | Victor BVE-37525 |
| 1927 | The Little White House (At the End of Honeymoon Lane) | James F. Hanley | Victor BVE-37526 |
| 1927 | Night of Romance | Pauline Alpert | Victor BVE-06-03-01 |
| 1927 | Perils of Pauline | Pauline Alpert | Victor BVE-06-03-02 |
| 1927 | Hallelujah | Vincent Youmans | Victor BVE-38858 |
| 1927 | Magnolia (Mix the lot - what have you got?) | Ray Henderson | Victor BVE-38859 |
| 1927 | Dancing Tambourine | William Conrad Polla | Victor BVE-40541 |
| 1927 | Doll Dance | Nacio Herb Brown | Victor BVE-40542 |
| 1932 | Saint Louis Blues | W. C. Handy | Victor BRC-72210 |
| 1932 | Song of India | Rimsky-Korsakov | Victor BRC-72211 |
| 1944 | Where or When | Rodgers and Hart | Sonora SR1516 |
| 1944 | Dream of a Doll | Pauline Alpert | Sonora SR1517 |
| 1944 | The Parade of the Wooden Soldiers | Ballard MacDonald, Leon Jessel | Sonora SR1518 |
| 1944 | Hungarian Rhapsody No. 2 | Franz Liszt | Sonora SR1519 |
| 1944 | Toy Trumpet | Raymond Scott | Sonora SR1520 |
| 1944 | Chopsticks | Euphemia Allen | Sonora SR1521 |
| 1944 | Sweet Sue | Victor Young | Sonora SR1522 |
| 1944 | In a Country Garden | Percy Grainger | Sonora SR1523 |
| 1944 | The Donkey Serenade, The Very Thought of You, The Piccolino | Allan Jones; Ray Noble; Ginger Rogers, Fred Astaire | Muzak 61-081 |
| 1946 | Minuet | Ignacy Jan Paderewski | Pilotone 5033 |
| 1946 | March Militaire | Franz Schubert | Pilotone 5034 |
| 1946 | Humoresque | Antonín Dvořák | Pilotone 5035 |
| 1946 | Blue Danube Waltz | Johann Strauss II | Pilotone 5036 |
| 1946 | La Cinquantaine | Jean Gabriel-Marie | Pilotone 5037 |
| 1946 | Song of India | Rimsky-Korsakov | Pilotone 5038 |
| 1946 | Dancing Doll | Ede Poldini | Pilotone 5039 |
| 1946 | The Minute Waltz | Frédéric Chopin | Pilotone 5040 |
| 1955 | Piano Moods | | Waldorf Music Hall MH 33-115 |
| 1955 | Piano Moods | | Sparton 33-4919 |

== Personal life ==
Pauline was born in Rochester, New York on December 27, 1905, and spent her childhood there. Her father was Samuel Alpert, a Russian immigrant and painter, and her mother was Anna Rosk, a native New Yorker and skilled musician. To support her family's poor finances, as an 11 year old, she would give piano lessons for 25 cents. She won a four year scholarship to the Eastman School of Music and received training as a classical pianist, where her primary instructor was Selim Palmgren.

Pauline married Sidney Rooff in 1940. They had no children.

She died at St. Barnabas Hospital in The Bronx on April 6, 1988.

== Legacy ==
Pauline's work is included in the 2014 book by Peter Mintun compiling popular piano roll and novelty song artists from the 1920s and 1930s, Novelty Masterpieces of the Gershwin Era: The Music of Zez Confrey, Pauline Alpert and Rube Bloom.

== See also ==
- Novelty piano
