= Pictures of Moments to Remember =

Studio album by The Statler Brothers
- Released: 1971
- Genre: Country
- Label: Mercury
- Producer: Jerry Kennedy

The Statler Brothers chronology
Bed of Rose's (1970)	Pictures of Moments to Remember (1971)	Innerview (1972)

Pictures of Moments to Remember is the fifth studio album by The Statler Brothers and the second one recorded for Mercury Records. Two of the songs from the album, "You Can't Go Home" and "Pictures" were released as singles.

== Track listing ==
1. "Pictures"
2. "Moments to Remember" (Robert Allen, Al Stillman)
3. "Second Thought"
4. "Just Someone I Used to Know"
5. "I Wonder How the Old Folks Are at Home"
6. "Things"
7. "You Can't Go Home"
8. "Tender Years" (Darrell Edwards)
9. "Makin Memories"
10. "Faded Love" (Bob Wills, John Wills)
11. "When You and I Were Young, Maggie" (George W. Johnson, James Austin Butterfield)

== Personnel ==
- Chip Young, Harold Bradley, Jerry Kennedy, Ray Edenton – guitar
- Pete Drake – steel guitar
- Jerry Kennedy – dobro
- Earl Scruggs – banjo
- Bob Moore – bass
- Charlie McCoy – organ, vibraphone, harmonica
- Floyd Cramer – piano
- Buddy Harman – drums
- Cam Mullins – arrangements
