= Christmas card (disambiguation) =

A Christmas card is a greeting card sent as part of the traditional celebration of Christmas.

Christmas Card can also refer to:

== Music ==
- Christmas Card (The Statler Brothers album)
- A Christmas Card, an album by The Forester Sisters
- Jimmy Dean's Christmas Card, an album by Jimmy Dean
- A Partridge Family Christmas Card
- The Temptations Christmas Card
- "Christmas Card", a song from Steven Curtis Chapman's album Joy

== Film ==
- The Christmas Card
