= How Great Thou Art (disambiguation) =

"How Great Thou Art" is a hymn by Carl Boberg.

How Great Thou Art may also refer to:

== Albums ==
- How Great Thou Art (Elvis Presley album), 1967
- How Great Thou Art (Willie Nelson album), 1996
- How Great Thou Art (The Statler Brothers album), 1969
- How Great Thou Art, a 1971 album by Burl Ives
- How Great Thou Art, a 1967 album by Pat Boone
