= Love's Ups and Downs =

Studio album by Barbara Mandrell
- Released: 1977
- Studios: RCA (Nashville, Tennessee); Woodland (Nashville, Tennessee)
- Genre: Country
- Label: ABC/Dot
- Producer: Tom Collins

Barbara Mandrell chronology
Lovers, Friends and Strangers (1977)	Love's Ups and Downs (1977)	Moods (1978)

Singles from Love's Ups and Downs
- 1. "Woman to Woman" Released: November 28, 1977; 2. "Tonight" Released: May 1, 1978

Love's Ups and Downs is the seventh solo studio album by the American country music singer Barbara Mandrell, released in 1977. It was produced by Tom Collins.

Love's Ups and Downs was Mandrell's second album released in 1977. The previous album released two singles, one of which was a top 5 hit. This album also released two singles. Both became top 10 hits on the Billboard Country charts, the first time Mandrell had had two solo top 10 hits in a row. The first single, "Woman to Woman" peaked in the top 5 and was a major hit that year. It was the first time that one of Mandrell's singles peaked inside the Billboard Hot 100, only peaking at #92. It also was the first time one of her songs reached the Adult Contemporary charts but, again, it was not a major hit, only reaching the top 50. The second single, "Tonight" was another top 5 hit, but did not chart on the Hot 100 or Adult Contemporary charts. The album as a whole was not a major success, only peaking at #29 on the Top Country Albums chart.

The album included a remake of Jackie Wilson's, "(Your Love Has Lifted Me) Higher and Higher", which had been a pop hit for Rita Coolidge, and "How Long", originally recorded by Ace. "Woman to Woman" was a cover version of Shirley Brown's #1 R&B hit from 1974. The album has ten tracks, some of which were new songs.

== Track listing ==
1. "(Your Love Has Lifted Me) Higher and Higher" (Gary Jackson, Carl Smith)
2. "Don't Hand Me No Hand-Me-Down Love" (Charles Silver, Rory Bourke)
3. "If I Were a River" (Marty Yonts)
4. "The Magician" (Kent Robbins)
5. "Woman to Woman" (Homer Banks, Eddie Marion, Henderson Thigpen)
6. "Tonight" (Rafe Van Hoy, Don Cook)
7. "Let the Rain Out" (Geoffrey Morgan)
8. "A Fancy Place to Cry" (John Schweers)
9. "Walking Home in the Rain" (Paul Craft)
10. "How Long" (Paul Carrack)

== Personnel ==
- Barbara Mandrell – lead vocals
- Lea Jane Berinati, Tom Brannon, Dorothy Deleonibus, Janie Fricke, Ginger Holladay, The Jordanaires, Sherilyn Kramer, Duane West – backing vocals
- Mike Leech – bass guitar
- Hayward Bishop, Kenny Malone – drums
- Tommy Williams – fiddle
- Pete Bordonali, Jimmy Capps, Steve Gibson, Glenn Keener, Billy Sanford, Bobby Thompson, Chip Young, Reggie Young – guitar
- Charlie McCoy – harmonica
- Charlie McCoy, Farrell Morris – percussion
- David Briggs, Tony Migliore, Bobby Ogdin, Hargus "Pig" Robbins – piano
- John Hughey, Hal Rugg – steel guitar
- George Binkley III, Marvin Chantry, Roy Christensen, Carl Gorodetzky, Sheldon Kurland, Wilfred Lehmann, Steven Smith, Gary Vanosdale, Stephanie Woolf – strings
- Archie Jordan – string arrangements (tracks 1,5,6,10)
- Charlie McCoy, Farrell Morris – vibraphone

== Charts ==
Album – Billboard (North America)

Year	Chart	Position
1977	Top Country Albums	29

Singles – Billboard (North America)

Year	Single	Chart	Position
1977	"Woman to Woman"	Hot Country Singles & Tracks	4
1977	"Woman to Woman"	Billboard Hot 100	92
1977	"Woman to Woman"	Hot Adult Contemporary Tracks chart	49
1978	"Tonight"	Hot Country Singles & Tracks	5
