= Novelty piano =

Genre of music

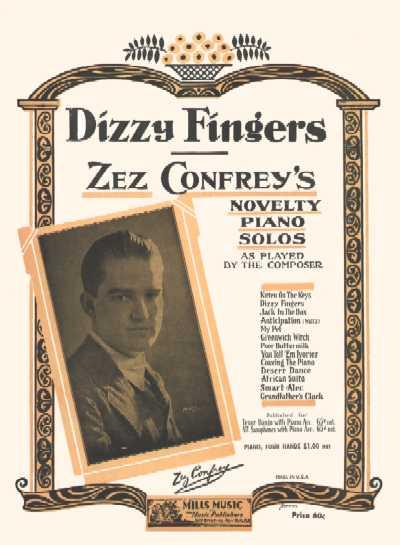
- The sheet music for "Dizzy Fingers" by Zez Confrey, one of the most popular of the novelty piano composers.
- Stylistic origins: Ragtime; Classical music; Novelty
- Cultural origins: United States
- Typical instruments: Piano

Novelty piano is a genre of piano and novelty music that was popular during the 1920s. A successor to ragtime and an outgrowth of the piano roll music of the 1910s, it can be considered a pianistic cousin of jazz, which appeared around the same time. "Nola," a 1915 composition by New York pianist Felix Arndt, is generally considered the first novelty piano hit. Many early novelty composers were piano roll artists from the Chicago area, where two of the largest piano roll companies, QRS and Imperial, were based. While often only lightly syncopated or lacking syncopation entirely, novelty piano influenced the evolution of jazz. It is distinct from stride piano, which was developed in New York at about the same time.

The earliest composers of novelty piano were piano roll artists seeking to sell piano rolls. These pieces started out as highly complex dance pieces with characteristic breaks, consecutive fourths, and advanced harmonies—but in contrast with ragtime and other jazz piano styles, usually relying on the use of triplets and dotted-eighth/sixteen figures, rather than the syncopated eight-note-based patterns of ragtime. Various theories exist to explain this characteristic: Typically white consumers of such music may not yet have been receptive to music of more rhythmic complexity; and/or because the almost exclusively white composers of novelty piano music had not yet absorbed the principles of syncopated music, and/or were not apt to utilize it when composing, as many of them came from classical music backgrounds where the systematic emphasis of weaker beats was uncommon.

The pioneer of the novelty piano style was Charley Straight, whose compositions were issued on piano roll years before Confrey's novelty hits. Early Charley Straight novelties include "S'more," "Playmor," "Nifty Nonsense," "Rufenreddy," and "Wild And Wooly."

Novelty piano came most powerfully to the attention of the public in 1921, with the appearance of Zez Confrey's "Kitten on the Keys". Its popularity quickly led to other Confrey works including "Dizzy Fingers" and "Greenwich Witch", and inspired other artists to issue novelty pieces. The style remained popular through the end of the decade, at which time big bands were on the rise, player pianos were in decline, and the popularity of jazz continued unabated. Novelty piano slowly succumbed to, or was absorbed into, the new orchestral styles as the piano moved away from center stage and took on more of a supporting role.

Novelty piano was also generally marketed differently from the earlier ragtime form. Whilst ragtime was generally sold in the form of sheet music, it was important to keep it simple enough to be played by competent amateurs. By the mid-teens, though, two new technologies had appeared which allowed the general public to hear music as performed by skilled musicians: the piano roll and the phonograph record. Novelty piano was developed as a vehicle to showcase the talents of these professionals, and was thus more often sold in the form of recordings and piano rolls than as sheet music. In contrast with most prior popular piano styles, it was shorn of hackneyed Victorian-era stylings, infused with chromatic flourishes, and influenced by the "modernistic" sounds of the Art Deco 1920s. Novelty pianists tended to be highly classically trained, and the music reflected their fondness for complex chordal ideas.

Prominent artists in the novelty piano genre include Zez Confrey, Charley Straight, Roy Bargy, Pauline Alpert, Fred Elizalde, Rube Bloom, Clement Doucet, Max Kortlander, Edythe Baker and Billy Mayerl.
