= Swimming in Champagne =

Studio album by Eric Heatherly
- Released: April 18, 2000
- Genre: Rockabilly; country rock
- Label: Mercury Records
- Producer: Keith Stegall

Eric Heatherly chronology
Swimming in Champagne (2000)	The Lower East Side of Life (2005)

Singles from Swimming in Champagne
- 1. "Flowers on the Wall" Released: February 26, 2000; 2. "Swimming in Champagne" Released: September 16, 2000; 3. "Wrong Five O'Clock" Released: November 4, 2000

Professional ratings
Review scores
Source	Rating
AllMusic	3/5 stars
Calgary Herald	3/4 stars
The Encyclopedia of Popular Music	3/5 stars
USA Today	2.5/4 stars

Swimming in Champagne is the debut studio album by American singer Eric Heatherly, released in 2000.

The album contains a cover of "Flowers on the Wall", originally recorded by the Statler Brothers in 1965. Heatherly's cover was released as the album's lead-off single, peaking at number 6 on the Billboard Hot Country Singles & Tracks (now Hot Country Songs) chart and number 50 on the Billboard Hot 100. The second and third singles were the title track and "Wrong Five O'Clock", which respectively reached numbers 46 and 32 on the country chart. The album peaked at number 157 on the Billboard 200.

== Production ==
The album was produced by Keith Stegall. Heatherly cowrote every song aside from the Statler Brothers cover.

== Critical reception ==
Country Standard Time wrote that "the barroom anthems are tempered by the beautiful title ballad and the first single, a reworking of the Statler Brothers classic, 'Flowers On The Wall', that is different enough to succeed in the face of the original." The Morning Call thought that "trafficking in typical rock-country hybrids, this freshly minted singer-songwriter pens tunes that tell a story, not unlike, say, John Mellencamp, Tom Petty or Johnny Cash."

== Track listing ==
No.	Title	Writer(s)	Length
1.	"Someone Else's Cadillac"	Eric Heatherly, Cris Moore, Ed Hill	4:12
2.	"I Just Break 'Em""	Heatherly, Tim Schumacher	3:59
3.	"Didn't Mean a Thing"	Heatherly, Christopher Ward	5:01
4.	"One Night"	Heatherly, Michael Hunter Ochs	4:06
5.	"Why Don'tcha"	Heatherly, Richard E. Carpenter, Ochs	4:03
6.	"Flowers on the Wall"	Lew DeWitt	3:29
7.	"Let Me"	Heatherly, John Sieger	3:57
8.	"Swimming in Champagne"	Heatherly, Carpenter	4:26
9.	"Wrong Five O'Clock"	Heatherly, Carpenter	2:36
10.	"Freedom Chain"	Heatherly, Carpenter, Moore	3:58
11.	"She's So Hot"	Heatherly, Carpenter, Ochs	6:17

== Eric Heatherly's band ==
- Richard E. Carpenter – drums
- Jonathan Hamby – keyboards
- Eric Heatherly – lead vocals, electric guitar
- Jim Roller – bass guitar

== Additional musicians ==
- Randy McCormick – keyboards
- Gary Prim – piano
- John Wesley Ryles – background vocals
- John Willis – acoustic guitar
- Glenn Worf – bass guitar

== Chart performance ==
Chart (2000)	Peak position
U.S. Billboard Top Country Albums	17
U.S. Billboard 200	157
U.S. Billboard Top Heatseekers	6
Canadian RPM Country Albums	6
