= Eric Heatherly =

American singer-songwriter (born 1970)

- Born: Eric Lafon Heatherly; February 21, 1970 (age 56)
- Origin: Chattanooga, Tennessee, United States
- Genres: Country; rockabilly; country rock
- Occupation: Singer-songwriter
- Instruments: Vocals, guitar
- Years active: 2000–present
- Labels: Mercury Nashville; DreamWorks Nashville; NashVegas/Koch
- Website: http://www.theericheatherly.com/

Eric Lafon Heatherly (born February 21, 1970) is an American singer. In 2000, he debuted with a cover of The Statler Brothers' "Flowers on the Wall", the first of three singles from his debut album Swimming in Champagne, which was issued in 2000 on Mercury Nashville Records. A second album for Mercury was planned in 2001 but not released, due to the label's restructuring.

By 2002, he had signed to DreamWorks Nashville, where he recorded a third studio album which was also unreleased. His fourth overall album, and second to be released, was 2005's The Lower East Side of Life, issued on his own NashVegas Records label.

== Biography ==
Eric Heatherly was born February 21, 1970, in Chattanooga, Tennessee. Influenced at an early age by country rock acts such as Creedence Clearwater Revival, Eric wrote his first song at 8. Throughout his teenage years, Heatherly played guitar in several bands in the Chattanooga area.

He later moved to Nashville, Tennessee, where he gained a following as a musician, as well as endorsements for guitar manufacturers Fender Musical Instruments Corporation and Takamine Guitars. At the 1997 Country Music Association awards show, Heatherly also played lead guitar in Shania Twain's band.

== Musical career ==
In 2000, Heatherly was signed to Mercury Nashville Records as a recording artist. His debut single was a cover version of The Statler Brothers' 1965 debut single "Flowers on the Wall". Heatherly's rendition was a Top Ten hit on the Billboard Hot Country Singles & Tracks chart, peaking at #6 in mid-2000.

The song served as the first single from his debut album. Entitled Swimming in Champagne, the album was co-produced by Keith Stegall. Due to a restructuring of Mercury Nashville's parent company, Swimming in Champagne received minimal promotion; its second and third singles peaked at #46 and at #32 on the chart. Heatherly had also recorded a second album for Mercury, but it was not released, and Heatherly was dropped from the label by 2002.

A month after parting ways with Mercury, Heatherly signed to DreamWorks Records' Nashville division. His third album, to be titled Sometimes It's Just Your Time, was to have been released in late 2002. Its lead-off single ("The Last Man Committed") entered the country music chart; although promotional advance copies of the album, Sometimes It's Just Your Time, had been issued, it was ultimately unreleased as well.

Three years after his departure from DreamWorks's roster, he founded a personal label named NashVegas Records, with Koch Records serving as distributor. His fourth album overall (but only the second to be released), The Lower East Side of Life, was issued in 2005, though no singles were released from it.

After The Lower East Side of Life, Heatherly continued to tour, in addition to manufacturing custom-made guitar straps. Through the help of songwriter and producer Carson Chamberlain, Heatherly recorded a song called "Unforgettable", which appeared in an episode of Grey's Anatomy. He has also recorded another album, 2 High 2 Cry, released in 2009. A second self-released album, Painkillers, followed in 2010.

== Discography ==
=== Albums ===
Title	Album details	Peak chart positions		
Title	Album details	US Country	US	US Heat
Swimming in Champagne^{[A]}	Release date: April 18, 2000; Label: Mercury Nashville	17	157	6
The Lower East Side of Life	Release date: April 26, 2005; Label: NashVegas/Koch Entertainment	—	—	—
2 High 2 Cry	Release date: 2009; Label: Self-released	—	—	—
Painkillers	Release date: 2010; Label: Self-released	—	—	—
The Goats of Kudzu	Release date: 2012; Label: Self-released	—	—	—
"—" denotes releases that did not chart

Notes

- A Swimming in Champagne also peaked at number 6 on the RPM Country Albums chart in Canada.

=== Singles ===
Year	Single	Peak chart positions		Album
Year	Single	US Country	US	Album
2000	"Flowers on the Wall"^{[A]}	6	50	Swimming in Champagne
2000	"Swimming in Champagne"	46	—	Swimming in Champagne
2001	"Wrong Five O'Clock"	32	—	Swimming in Champagne
2002	"The Last Man Committed"	36	—	Sometimes It's Just Your Time
2002	"Sometimes It's Just Your Time"	—	—	Sometimes It's Just Your Time
2003	"When a Heart Begins to Drift"	—	—	Sometimes It's Just Your Time
"—" denotes releases that did not chart

Notes

- A "Flowers on the Wall" also peaked at number 3 on the RPM Country Tracks chart in Canada.

=== Music videos ===
Year	Video	Director
2000	"Flowers on the Wall"	Gerry Wenner
2000	"Swimming in Champagne"	
2002	"The Last Man Committed"	Steven Goldmann
