= The Kid's Last Fight =

1953 song by Bob Merrill

Song
- Released: 1953
- Songwriter: Bob Merrill

"The Kid's Last Fight" is a song written by Bob Merrill and first recorded by Frankie Laine in December 1953 at Columbia Records. The recording by Laine reached number 20 on the Billboard Hot 100. The song was covered by The Statler Brothers for their 10th Anniversary album, released in 1980 on Mercury Records.

The song tells the story of a young boxer, Kid McCoy, fighting against Tiger Wilson. He hopes to win enough prize money to buy a bungalow for himself and his darling Bess. The Kid is fighting while battling a fever and although he knocks out Tiger Wilson, the song says "Twas the fever that won the fight".

The song starts with a pianola sound like that used in silent films. Other versions of the song were recorded by such artists as Billy Cotton.
