= Tonight (Barbara Mandrell song) =

Single by Barbara Mandrell

from the album Love's Ups and Downs
- B-side: "If I Were a River"
- Released: May 1978
- Recorded: June 1977
- Genre: Country-pop; Countrypolitan
- Length: 2:59
- Label: ABC
- Songwriters: Don Cook; Rafe Van Hoy
- Producer: Tom Collins

Barbara Mandrell singles chronology
"Woman to Woman" (1977)	"Tonight" (1978)	"Sleeping Single in a Double Bed" (1978)

"Tonight" is a song written by Don Cook and Rafe Van Hoy, and recorded by American country music artist Barbara Mandrell. It was released in May 1978 as the second single from the album Love's Ups and Downs. It reached the top ten of the American country songs chart.

== Background and recording ==
Barbara Mandrell had a series of charting singles at Columbia Records brought some early commercial success to her recording career. In 1975 she moved to ABC/Dot Records and found a musical style that helped her reach her breakthrough. This was crafted by producer Tom Collins, who helped bring a Countrypolitan sound. One of the singles she cut during this period was 1978's "Tonight". It was written by Rafe Van Hoy and Don Cook. Collins produced the track's recording session in June 1977 in Nashville, Tennessee.

== Release and chart performance ==
"Tonight" was released as a single on ABC Records in August 1977. It was backed on the B-side by the song "If I Were a River". The track was issued by the label as a seven inch vinyl single. The single spent 13 weeks on America's Billboard country songs chart, peaking at number five by July 1978. Outside of the country market, "Tonight" also charted on the Billboard Bubbling Under Hot 100 singles chart, peaking at number three on the survey in 1978. In Canada, the single climbed to the number 25 position on the RPM country chart. The song was released on Mandrell's fourth ABC studio album called Love's Ups and Downs.

== Track listing ==
7" vinyl single

- "Tonight" – 2:59
- "If I Were a River" – 3:06

== Charts ==
Chart performance for "Tonight"
Chart (1978)	Peak position
Canada Country Songs (RPM)	25
US Bubbling Under Hot 100 (Billboard)	3
US Hot Country Songs (Billboard)	5
