= The Lower East Side of Life =

2005 album by Eric Heatherly

Studio album by Eric Heatherly
- Released: April 26, 2005
- Genre: Country
- Label: NashVegas/Koch Entertainment
- Producer: Eric Heatherly

Eric Heatherly chronology
Swimming in Champagne (2000)	The Lower East Side of Life (2005)	2 High 2 Cry (2009)

Professional ratings
Review scores
Source	Rating
AllMusic	3.5/5 stars
Country Standard Time	

The Lower East Side of Life is the second studio album to be released by American singer Eric Heatherly. It was released in 2005, after Heatherly had recorded two unreleased albums on two different labels. The album was released on Heatherly's personal label, NashVegas Records, in association with Koch Entertainment, and no singles were released from it.

== Critical reception ==
Country Standard Time describes the album as containing "honest country songs."

== Track listing ==
All tracks are written by Eric Heatherly; "The Lower East Side of Life" co-written by Jonnie Barnett; "Go Where You Hide" co-written by Christy Heatherly.

No.	Title	Length
1.	"Judging Beauty"	3:07
2.	"Hang It on Your Heart"	3:56
3.	"Job"	3:22
4.	"Ruin"	3:31
5.	"Whatever Happened..."	3:36
6.	"The Lower East Side of Life"	3:39
7.	"Who Needs Enemies (With Family Like You)"	3:27
8.	"Dark Days"	4:08
9.	"Go Where You Hide"	3:59
10.	"Love Story Love"	3:58
11.	"Way Down"	3:59

== Musical credits ==
- José Arbelaez - organ, synthesizer, piano, drums, percussion
- Eric Darken - percussion
- Eric Heatherly - lead vocals, background vocals, electric guitar, acoustic guitar, bass guitar, mandolin, Hammond organ, synthesizer, harmonica
- Chris McHugh - drums
- Greg Morrow - drums
