= Do You Remember These =

Single by The Statler Brothers

from the album Innerview
- B-side: "Since Then"
- Released: March 11, 1972
- Recorded: November 1971
- Genre: Country
- Length: 2:53
- Label: Mercury
- Songwriter(s): Don Reid, Harold Reid, Larry Lee
- Producer(s): Jerry Kennedy

The Statler Brothers singles chronology
| "You Can't Go Home" (1971) | "Do You Remember These" (1972) | "The Class of '57" (1972) |

"Do You Remember These" is a song written by Don Reid, Harold Reid and Larry Lee, and recorded by American country music group The Statler Brothers. It was released in March 1972 as the first single from the album Innerview. The song reached No. 2 on the Billboard Hot Country Singles & Tracks chart, and No. 1 on the Cashbox Country Top 100. "Do You Remember These" was also The Statler Brothers sole entry on the Easy Listening chart, where it peaked at No. 18.

== Background ==
The song was a landmark-of-sorts for the Statlers, as they began recording songs appealing to nostalgia. While part of that repertoire included covers of oldies and standards, several of their other biggest hits had lyrics that recalled good times of years past.

"Do You Remember These" is a list song recalling items and events that baby boomers and the Silent Generation experienced in childhood and adolescence in from the late 1940s and into the 1950s. The items mentioned covered a broad range of categories, including stars of the era (James Dean, Roy Rogers, Clark Gable), radio shows (Captain Midnight, The Shadow, the hit parade, along with collecting radio premiums), fashion (ducktail and flattop haircuts, aviator hats, crinoline petticoats, boat neck shirts), brands (Studebaker, Cracker Jack, Pepsi, Ovaltine), social activities (Sadie Hawkins dances, sandlot baseball, telling knock knock jokes), phrases ("he's a real gone cat," "pitching woo," "mum's the word"), songs ("Don't Let the Stars Get in Your Eyes," "Blue Suede Shoes," "Tutti Frutti") and childhood experiences ("Indian burn," "cigar bands on your hands," "taking your tonsils out").

The song caused some unpleasantness for the group in Britain, due to the reference to "knickers to your knees," meaning short pants or knickerbockers. In the UK, the phrase is taken to refer to women's underpants.

The nostalgia theme would continue in several other Statler Brothers songs, including "The Movies" (1977) and "Child of the Fifties" (1983).

== Chart performance ==
| Chart (1972) | Peak position |
|---|---|
| US Hot Country Songs (Billboard) | 2 |
| US Billboard Easy Listening | 18 |
| US Billboard Bubbling Under the Hot 100 | 105 |
