= The Originals (The Statler Brothers album) =

Studio album by The Statler Brothers
- Released: 1979
- Genre: Country
- Label: Mercury
- Producer: Jerry Kennedy

The Statler Brothers chronology
Christmas Card (1978)	The Originals (1979)	10th Anniversary (1980)

Singles from The Originals
- 1. "How to Be a Country Star" Released: March 1979; 2. "Nothing as Original as You" Released: October 27, 1979

Professional ratings
Review scores
Source	Rating
Allmusic	4/5 stars

The Originals is the twentieth studio album by American country music group The Statler Brothers. It was released in 1979 via Mercury Records. The album peaked at number 8 on the Billboard Top Country Albums chart.

== Track listing ==
No.	Title	Writer(s)	Length
1.	"How to Be a Country Star"	Don Reid, Harold Reid	3:26
2.	"When the Yankees Come Home"	D. Reid	3:23
3.	"Here We Are Again"	D. Reid	2:45
4.	"Where He Always Wanted to Be"	D. Reid, H. Reid	2:50
5.	"Mr. Autry"	D. Reid, H. Reid	3:05
6.	"Nothing as Original as You"	D. Reid	2:21
7.	"Counting My Memories"	Kim Reid	2:40
8.	"Little Farther Down the Road"	Lew DeWitt	2:32
9.	"Just a Little Talk with Jesus"	Cleavant Derricks	2:30
10.	"Almost in Love"	D. Reid, H. Reid	2:45
11.	"The Star-Spangled Banner"	Francis Scott Key	1:43

== Chart performance ==
Chart (1979)	Peak position
U.S. Billboard Top Country Albums	8
U.S. Billboard 200	183
Canadian RPM Country Albums	21
