= Flowers on the Wall =

Song by The Statler Brothers

Single by The Statler Brothers

from the album Flowers on the Wall
- B-side: "Billy Christian"
- Released: June 14, 1965
- Recorded: March 13, 1965
- Studio: Columbia (Nashville, Tennessee)
- Genre: Country
- Length: 2:19
- Label: Columbia 43315
- Songwriter: Lew DeWitt
- Producers: Don Law and Frank Jones

The Statler Brothers singles chronology
"Your Foolish Game" (1964)	"Flowers on the Wall" (1965)	"My Darling Hildegarde" (1966)

"Flowers on the Wall" is a song originally recorded by American country music group The Statler Brothers. Written and composed by Lew DeWitt, the group's original tenor vocalist, the song peaked in popularity in January 1966, spending four weeks at number two on the Billboard magazine Hot Country Singles chart, and reaching number four on the Billboard Hot 100 chart.

The song won the 1966 Grammy Award for Best Contemporary (R&R) Performance - Group (Vocal or Instrumental).

The Statler Brothers re-recorded the song in 1975 for their first greatest-hits album for Mercury Records, The Best of The Statler Brothers.

== Critical reception ==
In 2024, Rolling Stone ranked the song at number 116 on its 200 Greatest Country Songs of All Time ranking.

== Charts ==
Chart (1965–1966)	Peak position
Canada RPM Top Singles	1
New Zealand Singles Chart	2
South Africa (Springbok)	7
UK Singles Chart	38
US Billboard Hot 100	4
US Hot Country Songs (Billboard)	2

== Eric Heatherly version ==
"Flowers on the Wall"

Single by Eric Heatherly

from the album Swimming in Champagne
- B-side: "Someone Else's Cadillac"
- Released: February 26, 2000
- Genre: Country
- Length: 3:29
- Label: Mercury
- Songwriter: Lew DeWitt
- Producer: Keith Stegall

Eric Heatherly singles chronology
"Flowers on the Wall" (2000)	"Swimming in Champagne" (2000)

Eric Heatherly recorded the song in 2000 for his debut album, Swimming in Champagne. Released as his debut single, Heatherly's rendition reached number six on the Hot Country Songs chart and number 50 on the Billboard Hot 100.

=== Charts ===
Chart (2000)	Peak position
Canada Country Singles (RPM)	3
US Billboard Hot 100	50
US Hot Country Songs (Billboard)	6

==== Year-end charts ====
Chart (2000)	Position
US Country Songs (Billboard)	30

== In popular culture ==
- The song (its 1975 version) is used in the soundtrack to the 1994 film Pulp Fiction. In the film, Bruce Willis's character sings along to the line, "smoking cigarettes and watching Captain Kangaroo" as he is driving.
- The song is also referenced in the 1995 film Die Hard with a Vengeance where Bruce Willis's character says he was "working on a nice fat suspension, smoking cigarettes and watching Captain Kangaroo" .
- Kurt Vonnegut quotes the song's complete lyrics in his 1981 book Palm Sunday, calling the song "yet another great contemporary poem by the Statler Brothers" and using it to describe "the present condition" of an American man who had recently departed his family. "It is not a poem of escape or rebirth. It is a poem about the end of a man's usefulness", he adds.
- It is the theme song of the radio series Linda Smith's A Brief History of Timewasting.
- The Muppets covered the song in 2015, sung by a group of rats called 'The Ratler Brothers', (a clear reference to the Statler Brothers), and released an accompanying music video. The chorus lyrics were modernized and removed the reference to smoking, replacing it with activities such as Instagram stalking and playing sudoku.
- An instrumental version was used for the long-running TVNZ sheepdog trialling TV series A Dog's Show
