= Nothing as Original as You =

Single by The Statler Brothers

from the album The Originals
- B-side: "Counting My Memories"
- Released: October 27, 1979
- Genre: Country
- Length: 2:22
- Label: Mercury
- Songwriter(s): Don Reid
- Producer(s): Jerry Kennedy

The Statler Brothers singles chronology
| "Here We Are Again" (1979) | "Nothing as Original as You" (1979) | "(I'll Even Love You) Better Than I Did Then" (1980) |

"Nothing as Original as You" is a song written by Don Reid, and recorded by American country music group The Statler Brothers. It was released in October 1979 as the third single from the album The Originals. The song reached #10 on the Billboard Hot Country Singles & Tracks chart.

== Chart performance ==
| Chart (1979) | Peak position |
|---|---|
| US Hot Country Songs (Billboard) | 10 |
| Canadian RPM Country Tracks | 33 |
