= Maple Street Memories =

Studio album by The Statler Brothers
- Released: 1987
- Genre: Country
- Length: 30:57
- Label: Mercury
- Producer: Jerry Kennedy

The Statler Brothers chronology
Radio Gospel Favorites (1986)	Maple Street Memories (1987)	Music, Memories, and You (1990)

Singles from Maple Street Memories
- 1. "I'll Be the One" Released: May 1987; 2. "The Best I Know How" Released: February 20, 1988

Professional ratings
Review scores
Source	Rating
Allmusic	4.5/5 stars

Maple Street Memories is the thirtieth studio album by American country music group The Statler Brothers. It was released in 1987 via Mercury Records. The album peaked at number 9 on the Billboard Country Albums chart.

== Track listing ==
No.	Title	Writer(s)	Length
1.	"Our Street/Tell Me Why"	Don Reid, Harold Reid, Mitchell Parish, Michael Edwards, Sigmund Spaeth	8:10
2.	"Maple Street Mem'ries"	Don Reid	4:16
3.	"Deja Vu"	H. Reid, Don Reid, Debo Reid	2:32
4.	"Am I Crazy?"	Jimmy Fortune	3:31
5.	"The Best I Know How"	Kim Reid	2:55
6.	"I'll Be the One"	Don Reid, Debo Reid	2:03
7.	"Beyond Romance"	Fortune, John Rimel	2:54
8.	"I Lost My Heart to You"	Fortune, Rimel	2:07
9.	"Jesus Showed Me So"	H. Reid, Don Reid	2:29

== Chart positions ==
Chart (1984)	Peak position
U.S. Billboard Top Country Albums	9
