= How to Be a Country Star =

Song by The Statler Brothers

Single by The Statler Brothers

from the album The Originals
- B-side: "A Little Farther Down the Road"
- Released: March 1979
- Recorded: September 28, 1978
- Genre: Country
- Length: 3:30
- Label: Mercury 55057
- Songwriters: Don Reid and Harold Reid
- Producer: Jerry Kennedy

The Statler Brothers singles chronology
"The Official Historian on Shirley Jean Berrell" (1978)	"How to Be a Country Star" (1979)	"Here We Are Again" (1979)

"How to Be a Country Star" is a song recorded by American country music group The Statler Brothers, written by group members Harold Reid and Don Reid. The song – a humorous, tongue-in-cheek advice song that names many of the top country music recording artists of the time, along with a number of classic country artists – was released in March 1979 as the first single from the album The Originals. The song eventually climbed to No. 7 on the Billboard Hot Country Singles chart that May, and also No. 18 on the Canadian RPM country singles chart.

== Names of artists ==
As mentioned in the lyrics, directly or indirectly referred to, the song mentions the following country music artists, in order:

- Verse 1: Waylon Jennings, Jerry Reed, Jean Shepard, Tom T. Hall, Merle Haggard, Johnny Rodriguez and Bill Anderson.
- Verse 2: Ronnie Milsap, Mickey Gilley, Jerry Lee Lewis, Roy Acuff, Ralph Emery, Conway Twitty, Buck Owens and Webb Pierce.
- Verse 3: Sonny James, Minnie Pearl, Little Jimmy Dickens, Earl Scruggs, Willie Nelson, Mel Tillis, Roy Clark, Barbara Mandrell, Eddy Arnold and Charley Pride.
- Verse 4: Dolly Parton and Crystal Gayle.

The final verse also name drops each one of the Statler Brothers, whose membership at the time included Harold Reid, Don Reid, Phil Balsley and Lew DeWitt.

The song itself gives intended-to-be-taken-lightly advice about what it takes to be a country star, suggesting that if an aspiring star has a quality of one of the mentioned stars (such as being able to play piano like Ronnie Milsap, Mickey Gilley or Jerry Lee Lewis), that would guarantee country stardom. However, if no talent is apparent (as mentioned in the final verse), any beautiful woman could come backstage and meet up with one of the Statlers for advice and audition for their "Statler Brothers Revue."

== Chart performance ==
Chart (1979)	Peak position
US Hot Country Songs (Billboard)	7
Canadian RPM Country Tracks	18
