= The Class of '57 =

Single by The Statler Brothers

from the album Country Music Then and Now
- B-side: "Every Time I Trust a Gal"
- Released: August 19, 1972
- Genre: Country
- Length: 2:38
- Label: Mercury
- Songwriter(s): Don Reid, Harold Reid
- Producer(s): Jerry Kennedy

The Statler Brothers singles chronology
"Do You Remember These" (1972)	"The Class of '57" (1972)	"Monday Morning Secretary" (1973)

"The Class of '57" is a song written by Don Reid and Harold Reid, and recorded by American country music group The Statler Brothers. It was released in August 1972 as the first single from the album Country Music Then and Now. The song reached #6 on the Billboard Hot Country Singles & Tracks chart. The song was also critically acclaimed with the Statler Brothers winning the 1972 Grammy Award for Best Country Vocal Performance by a Duo or Group.

== Content ==
The song is a sometimes nostalgic, sometimes bittersweet look back at what became of a fictional high school graduating class from 15 years earlier. In turn, each one of the four singers — Don Reid, Phil Balsley, Lew DeWitt and Harold Reid — takes a solo turn at reflecting on several of the classmates. Some of the tales are of success; they became teachers, factory workers, a church organist, and owners of various business enterprises. Others are tragic, such as a classmate who ends up in a mental institution, another on welfare, yet another who ended up in severe debt, and most tragically one who, after having his wife leave him for another classmate, ends up taking his life. Reflecting real life, the lyrics also remember classmates of which they've lost track ("where Mavis finally wound up is anybody's bet").

The chorus has the underlying theme of reflecting on the high hopes and dreams they had in high school, but how life became more complicated as the years passed and did not turn out the way they hoped.

== Chart performance ==
Chart (1972)	Peak position
US Hot Country Songs (Billboard)	6
Canadian RPM Country Tracks	3
