= 10th Anniversary (The Statler Brothers album) =

Studio album by The Statler Brothers
- Released: 1980
- Genre: Country
- Length: 31:02
- Label: Mercury
- Producer: Jerry Kennedy

The Statler Brothers chronology
The Originals (1979)	10th Anniversary (1980)	Years Ago (1981)

Singles from 10th Anniversary
- 1. "Charlotte's Web" Released: July 12, 1980

Professional ratings
Review scores
Source	Rating
Allmusic	4/5 stars

10th Anniversary is the twenty-first studio album by American country music group The Statler Brothers. It was released in 1980 via Mercury Records. The album peaked at number 13 on the Billboard Top Country Albums chart.

== Track listing ==
No.	Title	Writer(s)	Length
1.	"Don't Forget Yourself"	Don Reid	2:51
2.	"The Kid's Last Fight"	Bob Merrill	3:18
3.	"How Are Things in Clay, Kentucky?"	D. Reid, Harold Reid	4:00
4.	"One Less Day To Go"	D. Reid, H. Reid	2:29
5.	"Nobody Wants To Be Country"	D. Reid, H. Reid	2:43
6.	"We Got Paid By Cash"	D. Reid, H. Reid	3:35
7.	"Old Cheerleaders Cry"	D. Reid, Kim Reid	3:00
8.	"'Til The End"	D. Reid	3:05
9.	"Nobody's Darling But Mine"	Jimmie Davis	3:06
10.	"Charlotte's Web"	Cliff Crofford, Johnny Durrill, Snuff Garrett	2:55

== Chart performance ==
Chart (1980)	Peak position
U.S. Billboard Top Country Albums	13
U.S. Billboard 200	169
