= Forever (The Statler Brothers song) =

Single by The Statler Brothers

from the album Four for the Show
- B-side: "More Like Daddy Than Me"
- Released: November 1986
- Genre: Country
- Length: 2:57
- Label: Mercury Nashville
- Songwriter(s): Jimmy Fortune
- Producer(s): Jerry Kennedy

The Statler Brothers singles chronology
"Only You" (1986)	"Forever" (1986)	"I'll Be the One" (1987)

"Forever" is a song written by Jimmy Fortune, and recorded by American country music group The Statler Brothers. It was released in November 1986 as the third single from their album Four for the Show. The song peaked at number 7 on the Billboard Hot Country Singles chart.

== Chart performance ==
Chart (1986–1987)	Peak position
US Hot Country Songs (Billboard)	7
Canadian RPM Country Tracks	11
