= Count On Me (The Statler Brothers song) =

Single by The Statler Brothers

from the album Four for the Show
- B-side: "Will You Be There"
- Released: April 1986
- Genre: Country
- Length: 2:27
- Label: Mercury Nashville
- Songwriter(s): Don Reid
- Producer(s): Jerry Kennedy

The Statler Brothers singles chronology
"Sweeter and Sweeter" (1985)	"Count On Me" (1986)	"Only You" (1986)

"Count On Me" is a song written by Don Reid, and recorded by American country music group The Statler Brothers. It was released in April 1986 as the first single from their album Four for the Show. The song peaked at number 5 on the Billboard Hot Country Singles chart.

== Chart performance ==
Chart (1986)	Peak position
US Hot Country Songs (Billboard)	5
Canadian RPM Country Tracks	4
