= The Best I Know How =

Single by The Statler Brothers

from the album Maple Street Memories
- B-side: "I Lost My Heart to You"
- Released: February 20, 1988
- Genre: Country
- Length: 2:57
- Label: Mercury
- Songwriter(s): Kim Reid
- Producer(s): Jerry Kennedy

The Statler Brothers singles chronology
"Maple Street Memories" (1987)	"The Best I Know How" (1988)	"Am I Crazy?" (1988)

"The Best I Know How" is a song written by Kim Reid, and recorded by American country music group The Statler Brothers. It was released in February 1988 as the third single from the album Maple Street Memories. The song reached #15 on the Billboard Hot Country Singles & Tracks chart.

== Charts ==
Chart (1988)	Peak position
Canada Country Tracks (RPM)	33
US Hot Country Songs (Billboard)	15
