= Don Drumm (singer) =

American country music singer

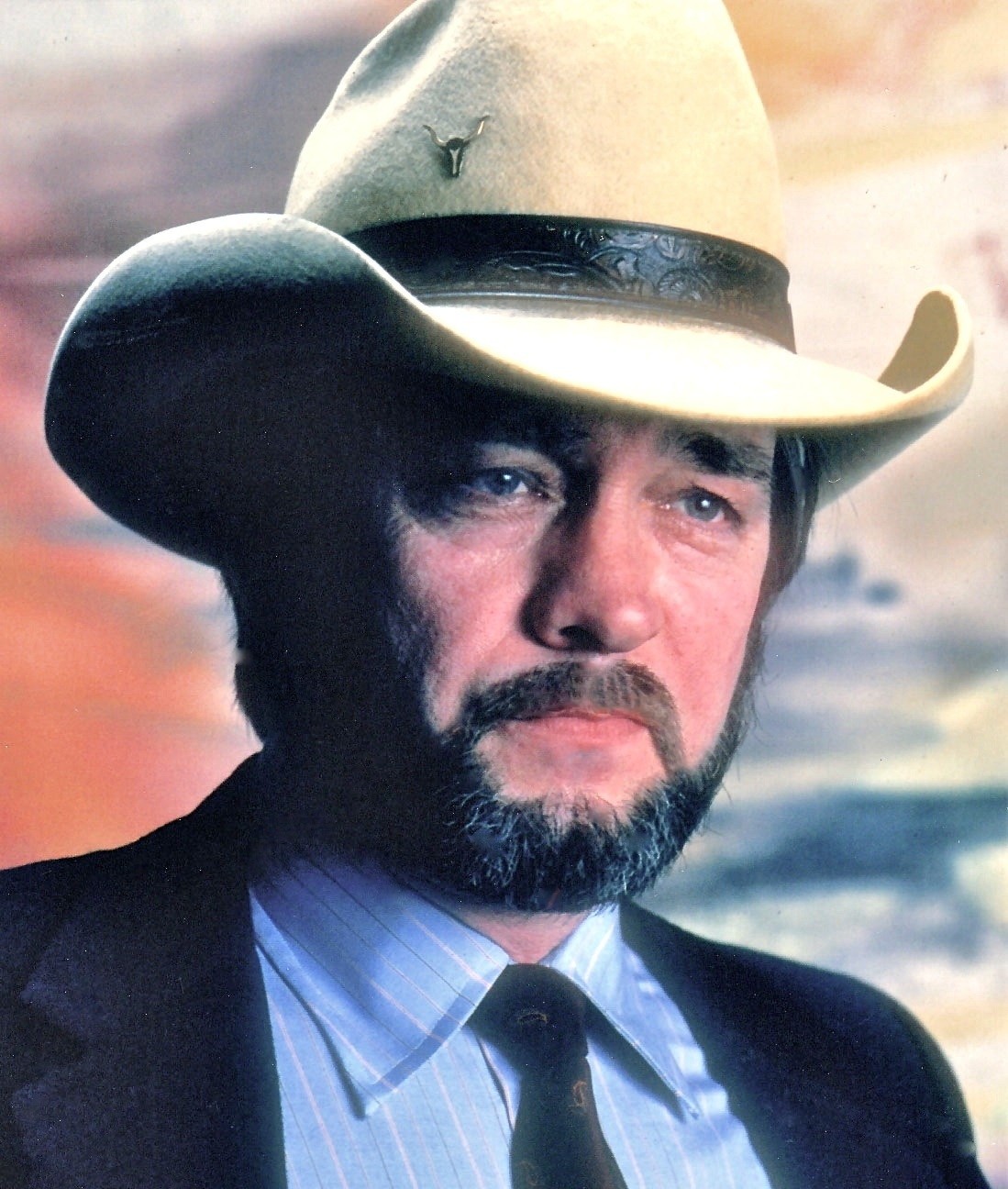

Background information
- Born: Westfield, Massachusetts
- Genre: Country
- Occupation: Singer
- Instruments: Vocals piano keyboard
- Years active: 1974–1978
- Label: Chart; Churchill

Don Drumm (born in Westfield, Massachusetts) is an American country music singer.

Drumm began his musical career at 15 years old as a Piano player at Geno's Brass Rail Restaurant. He recorded for Chart and Churchill Records, and entered the Hot Country Songs charts four times. Two of his singles, "Bedroom Eyes" and "Just Another Rhinestone", made top 20 & Top 40. Both hits, written by Ray Hillburn, were also the first chart entries for the Churchill label. He released one album, also titled Bedroom Eyes.

== Discography ==
=== Albums ===
Year	Album information
1978	Bedroom Eyes: Label: Churchill Records 67241; Released: 1978; Format: LP

=== Singles ===
Year	Single	Chart Positions	Album
Year	Single	US Country	Album
1974	"In at Eight and Out at Ten"	86	single only
1978	"Bedroom Eyes"	18	Bedroom Eyes
1978	"Just Another Rhinestone"	35	Bedroom Eyes
1978	"Something to Believe In"	81	Bedroom Eyes
