= Oh Happy Day (The Statler Brothers album) =

Studio album by The Statler Brothers
- Released: 1969
- Genre: Country Gospel
- Length: 30:12
- Label: Columbia
- Producer: George Richey

The Statler Brothers chronology
Sing The Big Hits (1967)	Oh Happy Day (1969)	Bed of Rose's (1970)

Oh Happy Day is the third studio album by the Statler Brothers and the last one recorded for Columbia Records. "O Happy Day" was the lone single.

== Track listing ==
1. "O Happy Day" (Edwin Hawkins)
2. "How Great Thou Art" (Carl Boberg)
3. "King of Love" (Harold Reid)
4. "Are You Washed in the Blood" (Traditional; arranged by The Statler Bros.)
5. "Pass Me Not" (Traditional; arranged by The Statler Bros.)
6. Daddy Sang Bass (Carl Perkins)
7. "Less of Me" (Glen Campbell)
8. "The Things God Gave Me" (Don Reid)
9. "Led Out of Bondage" (Robert L. Prather)
10. "Just in Time" (Jerry Lee Lewis)
11. "The Fourth Man" (Arthur Smith)
