= The Official Historian on Shirley Jean Berrell =

Single by The Statler Brothers

from the album Entertainers...On and Off the Record
- B-side: "The Best That I Can Do"
- Released: November 1978
- Genre: Country
- Length: 2:15
- Label: Mercury
- Songwriters: Don Reid; Harold Reid
- Producer: Jerry Kennedy

The Statler Brothers singles chronology
"Who Am I to Say" (1978)	"The Official Historian on Shirley Jean Berrell" (1978)	"How to Be a Country Star" (1979)

"The Official Historian on Shirley Jean Berrell" is a song recorded by the American country music group The Statler Brothers. The song was released in November 1978 as the third and final single from their album Entertainers... On and Off the Record.

== Content ==
Written by group members Don Reid and Harold Reid, the song is an uptempo recollection on various details in the life of the eponymous Shirley Jean Berrell, a woman whom the narrator knows. At the end of the song, the narrator then reveals the one detail that he does not know about her: "where she is right now".

== Critical reception ==
Cashbox published a positive review of the song, which stated that "This song...is tailor made for the group. The foursome lightheartedly carry a listener down memory lane again and their vocal harmonizing never sounded better."

== Chart performance ==
Chart (1978–1979)	Peak position
US Hot Country Songs (Billboard)	5
Canadian RPM Country Tracks	7
