= I'll Be the One =

Single by The Statler Brothers

from the album Maple Street Memories
- B-side: "Deja Vu"
- Released: May 1987
- Genre: Country
- Length: 2:05
- Label: Mercury Nashville
- Songwriter(s): Don Reid, Debo Reid
- Producer(s): Jerry Kennedy

The Statler Brothers singles chronology
"Forever" (1986)	"I'll Be the One" (1987)	"Maple Street Memories" (1987)

"I'll Be the One" is a song written by Don Reid and Debo Reid, and recorded by American country music group The Statler Brothers. It was released in May 1987 as the first single from their album Maple Street Memories. The song peaked at number 10 on the Billboard Hot Country Singles chart.

== Chart performance ==
Chart (1987)	Peak position
US Hot Country Songs (Billboard)	10
Canadian RPM Country Tracks	24
