= Sing the Big Hits =

Studio album by The Statler Brothers
- Released: 1967
- Genre: Country
- Length: 30:00
- Label: Columbia
- Producer: Bob Johnston

The Statler Brothers chronology
Flowers on the Wall (1966)	Sing the Big Hits (1967)	How Great Thou Art (1969)

Sing the Big Hits (a.k.a. The Statler Brothers Sing the Big Hits) is the second studio album by The Statler Brothers. It produced their hit singles "Ruthless" and "You Can't Have Your Kate and Edith, Too" which both peaked at #10 on the Billboard's Hot Country Songs chart.

== Track listing ==
Side one
No.	Title	Writer(s)	Length
1.	"Ruthless"	Bobby Braddock	2:10
2.	"You Can't Have Your Kate and Edith, Too"	Braddock, Curly Putman	2:25
3.	"Release Me"	Eddie Miller	3:08
4.	"Walking in the Sunshine"	Roger Miller	2:28
5.	"Funny, Familiar, Forgotten Feelings"	Mickey Newbury	2:32
6.	"Ruby, Don't Take Your Love to Town"	Mel Tillis	2:21

Side two
No.	Title	Writer(s)	Length
1.	"Green, Green Grass of Home"	Putman	2:58
2.	"There Goes My Everything"	Dallas Frazier	2:37
3.	"Almost Persuaded"	Billy Sherrill, Glenn Sutton	3:08
4.	"I Can't Help It If I'm Still in Love with You"	Hank Williams	2:54
5.	"Oh Shenandoah"	Traditional	3:19
Total length:			30:00
