= Short Stories (The Statler Brothers album) =

Studio album by The Statler Brothers
- Released: 1977
- Genre: Country
- Label: Mercury
- Producer: Jerry Kennedy

The Statler Brothers chronology
Country America Loves (1977)	Short Stories (1977)	Entertainers...On and Off the Record (1978)

Short Stories is the seventeenth studio album by American country music group The Statler Brothers. It was released in 1977 via Mercury Records. The album peaked at number 21 on the Billboard Top Country Albums chart.

== Track listing ==
No.	Title	Writer(s)	Length
1.	"Silver Medals and Sweet Memories"	Don Reid	2:30
2.	"The Regular Saturday Night Setback Card Game"	D. Reid, Harold Reid	2:52
3.	"That Summer"	D. Reid	2:54
4.	"He Went to the Cross Loving You"	D. Reid, H. Reid	2:36
6.	"Quite a Long, Long Time"	Lew DeWitt	2:30
7.	"Carried Away"	DeWitt	2:22
8.	"The Star"	D. Reid	3:26
9.	"Grandma"	D. Reid	2:58
10.	"Different Things to Different People"	D. Reid	2:52
11.	"Give My Love to Rose"	Johnny Cash	3:10
12.	"Some I Wrote"	D. Reid, H. Reid	2:20

== Chart performance ==
Chart (1977)	Peak position
U.S. Billboard Top Country Albums	21
