= Flowers on the Wall (album) =

Studio album by The Statler Brothers
- Released: 1966
- Studio: Columbia (Nashville, Tennessee)
- Genre: Country
- Length: 26:08
- Label: Columbia
- Producer: Don Law, Frank Jones

The Statler Brothers chronology
Flowers on the Wall (1966)	Sing the Big Hits (1967)

Singles from Flowers on the Wall
- 1. "Flowers on the Wall" Released: September 1965

Professional ratings
Review scores
Source	Rating
Allmusic	4.5/5 stars

Flowers on the Wall is the debut studio album by the Statler Brothers. It produced their debut single "Flowers on the Wall", a Top 5 country and pop hit that year. Members of Johnny Cash's band, the Tennessee Three played on the album, as it was recorded in between takes during the recording of a Johnny Cash album.

== Track listing ==
1. "Flowers on the Wall" (Lew DeWitt) - 2:19
2. "My Darling Hildegarde" (Don Reid) - 1:40
3. "King of the Road" (Roger Miller) - 2:06
4. "Memphis, Tennessee" (Chuck Berry) - 1:56
5. "I'm Not Quite Through Crying" (DeWitt) - 2:21
6. "My Reward" (Austin Roberts) - 2:46
7. "This Ole House" (Stuart Hamblen) - 1:44
8. "Billy Christian" (Tom T. Hall) - 2:01
9. "The Doodlin' Song" (Harold Reid) - 2:08
10. "Quite a Long, Long Time" (DeWitt) - 2:23
11. "Whiffenpoof Song" (Tod Galloway, Meade Minnigerode) - 1:48
12. "I Still Miss Someone" (Johnny Cash, Roy Cash) - 2:28
