= Thank You World =

Studio album by The Statler Brothers
- Released: 1974
- Genre: Country
- Label: Mercury
- Producer: Jerry Kennedy

The Statler Brothers chronology
Carry Me Back (1973)	Thank You World (1974)	Alive at the Johnny Mack Brown High School (1974)

Thank You World is the tenth studio album by American country music group The Statler Brothers. It was released in 1974 via Mercury Records. The album peaked at number 36 on the Billboard Top Country Albums chart.

== Track listing ==
No.	Title	Writer(s)	Length
2.	"Thank You World"	Don Reid, Lew DeWitt	3:07
3.	"City Lights"	Bill Anderson	3:15
4.	"Sweet Charlotte Anne"	D. Reid	2:25
5.	"Left-Handed Woman"	D. Reid, Harold Reid	2:14
6.	"The Blackwood Brothers by The Statler Brothers"	D. Reid	3:50
7.	"Cowboy Buckaroo"	Mason Williams	3:19
8.	"She's Too Good"	D. Reid, H. Reid	2:10
9.	"The Baptism of Jesse Taylor"	Dallas Frazier, Sanger D. Shafer	2:35
10.	"Streets of Baltimore"	Tompall Glaser, Harlan Howard	3:20
11.	"Margie's at the Lincoln Park Inn"	Tom T. Hall	2:51
12.	"The Boy Inside of Me"	DeWitt	3:10

== Chart performance ==
Chart (1974)	Peak position
US Top Country Albums (Billboard)	36
