= Shirley Brown =

American R&B singer

- Born: January 6, 1947 (age 79)
- Origin: West Memphis, Arkansas, United States
- Genre: R&B
- Occupation: Singer
- Instrument: Vocals
- Years active: 1974–present
- Labels: Abet, Stax, Arista, Malaco

Shirley Brown (born January 6, 1947, West Memphis, Arkansas) is an American R&B singer, best known for her million-selling single "Woman to Woman", which was nominated for a Grammy Award in 1975.

== Biography ==
Brown was born in West Memphis, but was raised in Madison, Illinois, where she started singing in church at the age of nine. Early experience singing gospel gave her a powerful but expressive voice likened to that of Aretha Franklin. Albert King discovered her when she was aged 14, singing in the Harlem Club in Brooklyn, Illinois. Young Shirley went on the road with King for nine years. While King made sure she had a tutor, Brown often cut her classes to work with the band.

By 1972, Shirley was living in East St. Louis, Illinois, where she made her first record for the Abet label called, "I Ain't Gonna Tell" and "Love Built on a Strong Foundation". Bandleader Oliver Sain produced the record; Sain worked with King on his first hit record ten years earlier. By 1974, King recommended Brown to Stax Records in Memphis, Tennessee, where he had been one of the label's stars for some time.

Her 1974 hit, "Woman to Woman" spent two weeks at No. 1 in the Billboard R&B chart and climbed to #22 in the Billboard Hot 100. It sold over one million copies by December 1974, and was awarded a gold disc. It would be Stax's final major hit record (the song was later covered by Barbara Mandrell in 1978 and became a top-five country hit).

A moderately successful debut album, Woman to Woman, was released by Stax on their Truth label, but by 1975, the company was struggling financially and also facing litigation. A follow-up single, "It Ain't No Fun" was only a moderate success, and Stax closed soon afterwards.

Her signing to Arista Records in 1977 resulted in the album Shirley Brown, produced by the former Stax owner Jim Stewart and writer-producer Bettye Crutcher, who provided most of the songs. These included "Blessed Is the Woman" which reached No. 14 R&B (#102 pop).

Brown continued to record for several labels after that, including Fantasy, on the re-formed Stax label, and Sound Town. She has been with the Mississippi based blues label, Malaco Records since 1989. She remains a popular live performer, mainly in southern states of the US, without having found the recording success of her earlier years.

== Discography ==
=== Albums ===
Year	Title	Peak chart positions	
Year	Title	US R&B	US Pop
1974	Woman to Woman	11	98
1977	Shirley Brown	―	―
1979	For the Real Feeling	―	―
1984	Intimate Storm	―	―
1989	Fire & Ice	66	―
1991	Timeless	63	―
1993	Joy and Pain	―	―
1995	Diva of Soul	67	―
1997	The Soul of a Woman	―	―
1998	Three Way Love Affair	―	―
2000	Holding My Own	―	―
2004	Woman Enough	―	―
2009	Unleashed	―	―
"—" denotes releases that did not chart.

=== Singles ===
Year	Title	Peak chart positions		Album
Year	Title	US R&B	US Pop	Album
1974	"Woman to Woman"	1	22	Woman to Woman
1975	"It Ain't No Fun"	32	94	Woman to Woman
1977	"Blessed Is the Woman (With a Man Like Mine)"	14	—	Shirley Brown
1977	"I Need Somebody to Love Me"	50	—	Shirley Brown
1978	"I Can't Move No Mountains"	92	—	Non-album single
1979	"After a Night Like This"	73	—	For the Real Feeling
1980	"You've Got to Like What You Do"	73	—	Non-album single
1984	"This Used to Be Your House"	70	—	Intimate Storm
1984	"I Don't Play That"	68	—	Intimate Storm
1985	"Boyfriend"	69	—	Intimate Storm
1989	"Ain't Nothin' Like the Lovin' We Got"	46	—	Fire & Ice
1995	"You Ain't Woman Enough (To Take My Man)"	80	—	Diva of Soul
"—" denotes releases that did not chart.

== Awards and nominations ==
- Grammy Award

1975 - Nominated for Best Rhythm & Blues Vocal Performance - Female

== See also ==
- List of 1970s one-hit wonders in the United States
