= Charlotte's Web (song) =

Single by The Statler Brothers

from the album 10th Anniversary
- B-side: "One Less Day to Go"
- Released: July 12, 1980
- Genre: Country
- Length: 2:57
- Label: Mercury
- Songwriters: Snuff Garrett, Cliff Crofford, John Durrill
- Producer: Jerry Kennedy

The Statler Brothers singles chronology
"(I'll Even Love You) Better Than I Did Then" (1980)	"Charlotte's Web" (1980)	"Don't Forget Yourself" (1980)

"Charlotte's Web" is a song written by Snuff Garrett, Cliff Crofford and John Durrill, and recorded by American country music group The Statler Brothers. It was released in July 1980 as the first single from the album 10th Anniversary. The song reached #5 on the Billboard Hot Country Singles & Tracks chart. It also appeared on the soundtrack to Smokey and the Bandit II.

== Chart performance ==
Chart (1980)	Peak position
US Hot Country Songs (Billboard)	5
Canadian RPM Country Tracks	27
