= Christmas Present (The Statler Brothers album) =

Studio album by The Statler Brothers
- Released: 1985
- Genre: Country, Christmas
- Length: 28:19
- Label: Mercury
- Producer: Jerry Kennedy

The Statler Brothers chronology
Pardners in Rhyme (1985)	Christmas Present (1985)	Four for the Show (1986)

Professional ratings
Review scores
Source	Rating
Allmusic	2/5 stars

Christmas Present is the twenty-seventh studio album and the second Christmas album by American country music group The Statler Brothers. Released in 1985 via Mercury Records, it peaked at number 42 on the Billboard Top Country Albums chart.

== Track listing ==
1. "Christmas Eve (Kodia's Theme)" (Don Reid, Harold Reid) – 3:16
2. "Christmas Country Style" (Jimmy Fortune) – 2:00
3. "Brahms' Bethlehem Lullaby" (Philip Balsley, Lew DeWitt, H. Reid) – 2:45
4. "Somewhere in the Night" (D. Reid) – 2:32
5. "An Old Fashioned Christmas" (John Rimel) – 3:27
6. "No Reservation at the Inn" (D. Reid, H. Reid) – 2:50
7. "Mary's Sweet Smile" (Balsley, Fortune, D. Reid, H. Reid) – 2:47
8. "Whose Birthday Is Christmas?" (H. Reid) – 2:40
9. "Old Toy Trains" (Roger Miller) – 2:32
10. "For Momma" (D. Reid, H. Reid) – 3:30

== Chart performance ==
Chart (1986)	Peak position
U.S. Billboard Top Country Albums	42
