= Four for the Show =

Studio album by The Statler Brothers
- Released: 1986
- Genre: Country
- Length: 29:03
- Label: Mercury
- Producer: Jerry Kennedy

The Statler Brothers chronology
Christmas Present (1985)	Four for the Show (1986)	Radio Gospel Favorites (1986)

Singles from Four for the Show
- 1. "Count On Me" Released: April 1986; 2. "Forever" Released: November 1986

Four for the Show is the twenty-eighth studio album by American country music group The Statler Brothers. It was released in 1986 via Mercury Records. The album peaked at number 7 on the Billboard Top Country Albums chart.

== Track listing ==
1. "Count On Me" (Don Reid) – 2:27
2. "You Oughta Be Here with Me" (Roger Miller) – 3:06
3. "We Got the Mem'ries" (Don Reid, Harold Reid) – 3:03
4. "I Don't Dream Anymore" (Don Reid, Debo Reid) – 2:32
5. "Forever" (Jimmy Fortune) – 2:57
6. "Only You" (Buck Ram) – 2:58
7. "For Cryin' Out Loud" (John Rimel, Fortune) – 3:04
8. "Will You Be There?" (Don Reid, Debo Reid) – 2:41
9. "I Believe I'll Live for Him" (Don Reid, H. Reid) – 2:40
10. "More Like Daddy Than Me" (Don Reid) – 3:35

== Personnel ==
- Mike Leech - bass
- Gene Chrisman, Jerry Carrigan - drums
- Hoot Hester - fiddle
- Ray Edenton, Jerry Kennedy, Pete Wade, Chip Young - guitar
- David Briggs, Larry Butler - keyboards
- Weldon Myrick - steel guitar
- The Nashville String Machine - strings; arranged by Bergen White

== Charts ==
=== Weekly charts ===
Chart (1986)	Peak position
US Billboard 200	183
US Top Country Albums (Billboard)	7

=== Year-end charts ===
Chart (1986)	Position
US Top Country Albums (Billboard)	36
