= Mel Street =

American singer-songwriter (1935–1978)

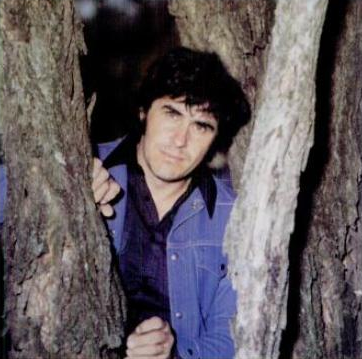
- Street in 1975

Background information
- Born: King Malachi Street; October 21, 1933; Grundy, Virginia, United States
- Died: October 21, 1978 (aged 45) Hendersonville, Tennessee, United States
- Genre: Country
- Occupation: Singer-songwriter
- Instrument: Guitar
- Years active: 1972–1978
- Labels: Metromedia, GRT, Polydor, Mercury

King Malachi "Mel" Street (October 21, 1933 – October 21, 1978) was an American country music singer who had 13 top-20 hits on the Billboard country charts.

== Biography ==
Street was born near Grundy, Virginia, United States. Publications cite his year of birth as 1933 and his family also maintains that he was born in 1933. However, his gravestone gives the year as 1936. He began performing on western Virginia and West Virginia radio shows at the age of 16. Street subsequently worked as a radio tower electrician in Ohio and as a nightclub performer in the Niagara Falls, New York, area. He moved back to West Virginia in 1963 to open an auto body shop.

From 1968 to 1972, Street hosted a show on a Bluefield, West Virginia, television station. He recorded his first single, "Borrowed Angel" – which he also wrote – in 1969 for a small, regional record label, Tandem Records. A larger label, Royal American Records, picked it up in 1972, and it became a top-10 Billboard hit. He recorded the biggest hit of his career, "Lovin' on Back Streets", in 1972.

Street's last television appearance was in 1977, in which he performed his 1976 hit "I Met a Friend of Yours Today" on That Good Ole Nashville Music.

Street recorded several hits in the mid-1970s, such as "You Make Me Feel More Like a Man", "Forbidden Angel", "I Met a Friend of Yours Today", "If I Had a Cheatin' Heart", and "Smokey Mountain Memories".

Suffering from clinical depression and alcoholism, Street died of a self-inflicted gunshot wound on October 21, 1978, his 45th birthday. He also had a record debut on the country charts that day, titled "Just Hangin' On", and later charted four posthumous songs. Street's idol, George Jones, sang "Amazing Grace" at his funeral.

His posthumous album, Mel Street's Greatest Hits, was promoted via television advertisements in 1981, and sold 400,000 copies.

== Discography ==
=== Albums ===
Year	Album	US Country	Label
1972	Borrowed Angel	14	Metromedia Country
1973	The Town Where You Live / Walk Softly On the Bridges	37	Metromedia Country
1974	Two Way Street	37	GRT
1975	Smokey Mountain Memories	16	GRT
1976	Mel Street's Greatest Hits	26	GRT
1976	Country Colors	—	GRT
1977	Mel Street	45	Polydor
1978	Country Soul	47	Polydor
1978	Mel Street	—	Mercury
1980	Many Moods of Mel	61	Sunbird

=== Singles ===
Year	Single	Chart Positions		Album
Year	Single	US Country	CAN Country	Album
1972	"Borrowed Angel"	7	9	Borrowed Angel
1972	"Lovin' On Back Streets"	5	8	Borrowed Angel
1973	"Walk Softly On the Bridges"	11	6	The Town Where You Live / Walk Softly On the Bridges
1973	"The Town Where You Live"	38	58	The Town Where You Live / Walk Softly On the Bridges
1973	"Lovin' On Borrowed Time"	11	7	Two Way Street
1974	"You Make Me Feel More Like a Man"	15	—	Two Way Street
1974	"Forbidden Angel"	16	47	Smokey Mountain Memories
1975	"Smokey Mountain Memories"	13	43	Smokey Mountain Memories
1975	"Even If I Have to Steal"	17	17	Smokey Mountain Memories
1975	"(This Ain't Just Another) Lust Affair"	23	—	Smokey Mountain Memories
1976	"The Devil in Your Kisses (And the Angel in Your Eyes)"	32	—	Mel Street's Greatest Hits
1976	"I Met a Friend of Yours Today"	10	—	Country Colors
1976	"Looking Out My Window Through the Pain"	24	—	Country Colors
1977	"Rodeo Bum"	56	—	Country Colors
1977	"Barbara Don't Let Me Be the Last to Know"	19	—	Mel Street (1977)
1977	"Close Enough for Lonesome"	15	—	Mel Street (1977)
1978	"If I Had a Cheating Heart"	9	—	Country Soul
1978	"Shady Rest"	24	—	Country Soul
1978	"Just Hangin' On"	68	—	Mel Street (1978)
1979	"The One Thing My Lady Never Puts Into Words"	17	—	Many Moods of Mel
1980	"Tonight Let's Sleep On It Baby"	30	—	Many Moods of Mel
1980	"Who'll Turn Out the Lights"	36	—	Many Moods of Mel
1981	"Slip Away" (w/ Sandy Powell)	48	—	Many Moods of Mel
