= Bed of Rose's =

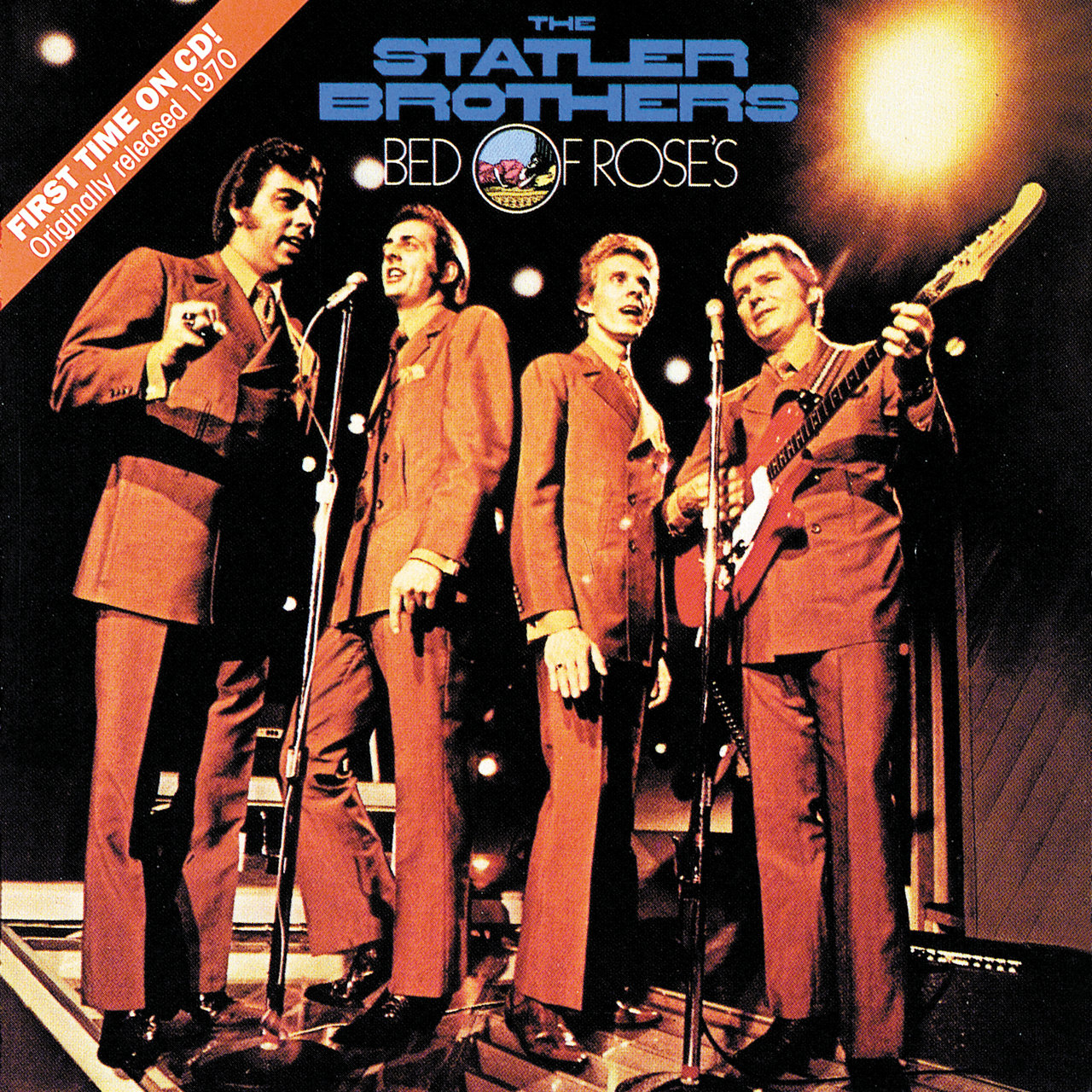

Single by the Statler Brothers

from the album Bed of Rose's
- B-side: "Last Goodbye"
- Released: October 1970
- Recorded: 1970
- Genre: Country
- Length: 2:28
- Label: Mercury 73141
- Songwriter: Harold Reid
- Producer: Jerry Kennedy

The Statler Brothers singles chronology
"I'm the Boy" (1969)	"Bed of Rose's" (1970)	"New York City" (1971)

"Bed of Rose's" is a song written by Harold Reid, and recorded by American country music group the Statler Brothers. It was released in October 1970 as the first single and title track from the album Bed of Rose's. The song reached its popularity peak in the winter of 1971, eventually reaching the Top 10 of the Billboard Hot Country Singles chart, peaking at number nine. It also reached #58 on the Billboard Hot 100 and #51 on the Australian Singles Chart (Go-Set). A cover version by Irish singer/songwriter Daniel O'Donnell was also recorded for his 1990 album Daniel O'Donnell - Favourites. Tanya Tucker also recorded a slightly modified version of it, included on her 1974 Columbia album, Would You Lay with Me (In a Field of Stone), and again for The Best Of Tanya Tucker, released in 1982 under MCA records.

== Content ==
The title of "Bed of Rose's" is, like some of the other Statler Brothers' works, a play on words - in this case on the common English idiom "bed of roses", which means an easy and pleasant life. The song is both a challenge of narrow-minded religion and moralism, and a gentle celebration of love.

A young orphaned man in a small town (possibly modeled after the Statlers' hometown of Staunton, Virginia) has for some reason become shunned by the "polite" members of society, and is forced to beg in the streets. His life improves when a streetwalker named Rose, nearly twice his age, takes him in; he becomes her lover. The song juxtaposes the hypocrisy of the nominally Christian townspeople who would "...go to church but left me in the street" and their envy of Rose who "managed a late evening business / like most of the town wished they could do", with the care and tender love that evolves between the two outcasts.

== Chart performance ==
Chart (1970–1971)	Peak position
Australia (Kent Music Report)	33
Canadian RPM Country Tracks	3
Canadian RPM Top Singles	86
New Zealand (Listener)	14
US Hot Country Songs (Billboard)	9
US Billboard Hot 100	58
