= Who Am I to Say =

Single by The Statler Brothers

from the album Entertainers On and Off the Record
- B-side: "I Dreamed About You"
- Released: August 5, 1978
- Genre: Country
- Length: 2:07
- Label: Mercury
- Songwriter(s): Kim Reid
- Producer(s): Jerry Kennedy

The Statler Brothers singles chronology
"Do You Know You Are My Sunshine" (1978)	"Who Am I to Say" (1978)	"The Official Historian on Shirley Jean Berrell" (1978)

"Who Am I to Say" is a song written by Kim Reid, and recorded by American country music group The Statler Brothers. Kim Reid is the daughter of Harold Reid, the bass singer of The Statler Brothers. The song was released in August 1978 as the second single from the album Entertainers On and Off the Record. The song reached #3 on the Billboard Hot Country Singles & Tracks chart. The song was covered by indie artist Kyle Boreing on his 2020 EP of the same name.

== Chart performance ==
Chart (1978)	Peak position
US Hot Country Songs (Billboard)	3
Canadian RPM Country Tracks	60
