= When You and I Were Young, Maggie =

American folk song

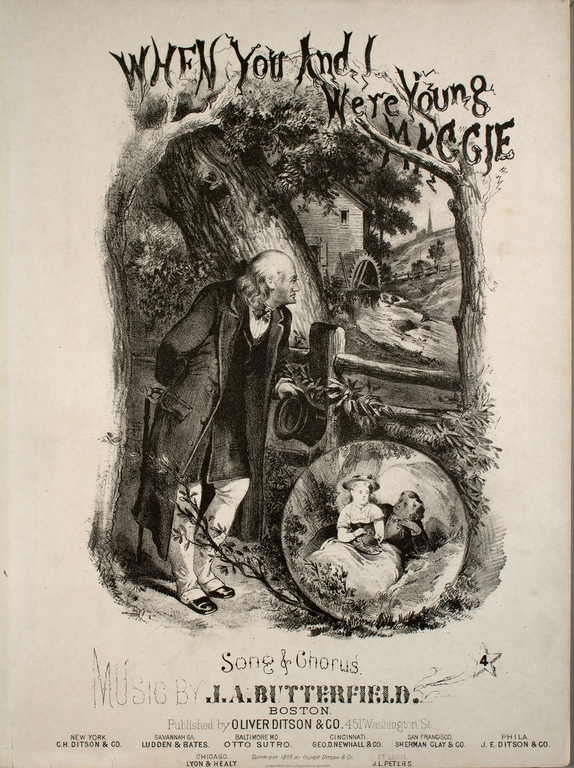
Sheet music cover for When You and I Were Young, Maggie (Oliver Ditson & Co. version of cover)

"When You and I Were Young, Maggie" (or simply known as "Maggie") is a folk song, popular song, and standard written by George W. Johnson and James Austin Butterfield.

== Origin ==
Although Springtown, Tennessee, has a small monument outside an old mill claiming the song was written by a local "George Johnson", in 1864, for his Maggie, the truth is that its lyrics were written as a poem by the Canadian school teacher George Washington Johnson from Hamilton, Ontario. Margaret "Maggie" Clark, three years his junior, was his pupil. They fell in love and during a period of illness, George walked to the edge of the Niagara escarpment, overlooking what is now downtown Hamilton, and composed the poem. The general tone is perhaps one of melancholy and consolation over lost youth rather than mere sentimentality or a fear of aging. It was published in 1864 in a collection of his poems entitled Maple Leaves. They were married October 21, 1864, but Maggie's health deteriorated and she died on May 12, 1865. James Austin Butterfield set the poem to music and it became popular all over the world. George Washington Johnson died in 1917. The house where the two lovers met still stands on the escarpment above Hamilton, and a plaque bearing the name of the song had been erected in front of the old building but is now inside the Township of Glanbrook building on Binbrook Road (Road 52) just east of Fletcher Road (Road 614). In 2005, the song was inducted into the Canadian Songwriters Hall of Fame.

== Recordings ==
Some claim that the song was first sung by Frank Dumont "as the Duprez & Benedict's Minstrels programs, dated, will show" in 1870. The song was first recorded by Corinne Morgan and Frank C. Stanley in 1905, and has been recorded since by many famous artists including opera tenors John McCormack in 1920 and Jan Peerce, early country singers Fiddlin' John Carson and Riley Puckett, country singer Slim Whitman, bluegrass musicians Stanley Brothers, Reno and Smiley, Mac Wiseman, David Grisman and James Alan Shelton, crooners Perry Como and Gene Autry and popular singers such as Will Oakland, Henry Burr, Harry MacDonough and Frank Dunn. Instrumental recordings of Butterfield's melody are also numerous, and date as far back as the 1930s. Notable recordings include those of jazzmen Benny Goodman, Fats Waller, Teddy Wilson and Sidney Bechet and ragtime pianist Johnny Maddox.Tom Rush 1974

A well-known rendition of the song is the one that composer Paul Smith arranged for Disney's Pollyanna. In the film, the band composed of elderly citizens of Harrington play a very fast instrumental version of "Maggie" at the bazaar dance.

"Maggie" has been re-scored as "When You and I Were Young, Maggie Blues", by Jack Frost and Jimmy McHugh. Mills Music Inc. published this edition in 1922, and again in 1949 with Guy Lombardo's picture on the cover. This was a 1951 hit for father and son Bing Crosby and Gary Crosby reaching the No. 8 spot in the Billboard charts and for the duet team of Margaret Whiting and Jimmy Wakely. John W. Schaum arranged "When you and I were young Maggie Boogie" and had it published by Belwin Inc. in 1952. The song is also considered as a standard of dixieland.

In 1983, Irish duo Foster and Allen reached number one in New Zealand, number six in Ireland, 27 in the UK singles chart and 17 in Australia with their version.

It was also recorded by De Dannan on the album Star-Spangled Molly, by Josef Locke on Let there be Peace, and by James Galway and The Chieftains on In Ireland. The Statler Brothers also recorded their harmonious rendition. In addition to Henry Burr and Harry MacDonough, other Canadian performers such as Hank Snow, The Climax Jazz Band and Murray McLaughlin have also recorded it. Tom Rush recorded a version on his CBS release Ladies Love Outlaws in 1974. American psychedelic rock band Magic Fern from Seattle (who wrote and performed together in the mid to late 1960s) recorded a version of this song entitled "Maggie" which is on the soundtrack for Adam Sandler's film Strange Wilderness. The Hot Sardines included it on their debut album, released in 2014. The Fureys and Davey Arthur included "Maggie" as the eleventh track on their 1984 album Golden Days.

== "Nora" ==
Seán O'Casey, in his 1926 play The Plough and the Stars, set new lyrics to Butterfield's melody, which the character Jack Clitheroe sings to his wife, Nora. The name Maggie is changed to Nora, while the refrain "you and I were young" becomes "you said you loved only me". In the play, Nora refers to the song as "When You said You Loved Me", but it is now more usually called "Nora"; a version released under that name by Johnny McEvoy in 1968 was a number-one single in Ireland.
