= Do You Know You Are My Sunshine =

Single by The Statler Brothers

from the album Entertainers...On and Off the Record
- B-side: "You're the First"
- Released: March 1978
- Genre: Country
- Length: 2:13
- Label: Mercury
- Songwriter(s): Don Reid; Harold Reid
- Producer(s): Jerry Kennedy

The Statler Brothers singles chronology
"Some I Wrote" (1978)	"Do You Know You Are My Sunshine" (1978)	"Who Am I to Say" (1978)

"Do You Know You Are My Sunshine" is a song written by Don Reid and Harold Reid, and recorded by American country music group The Statler Brothers. It was released in March 1978 as the first single from the album Entertainers...On and Off the Record. The song was The Statler Brothers' twenty-seventh country hit and the first of four number ones on the country chart, as well as the group's only number one with original tenor Lew DeWitt. The single stayed at number one for two weeks and spent a total of eleven weeks on the country chart.

== Chart performance ==
Chart (1978)	Peak position
US Hot Country Songs (Billboard)	1
Canadian RPM Country Tracks	5
