= Entertainers...On and Off the Record =

Studio album by The Statler Brothers
- Released: 1978
- Genre: Country
- Length: 29:00
- Label: Mercury
- Producer: Jerry Kennedy

The Statler Brothers chronology
Short Stories (1977)	Entertainers...On and Off the Record (1978)	Christmas Card (1978)

Singles from Entertainers...On and Off the Record
- 1. "Do You Know You Are My Sunshine" Released: March 1978; 2. "Who Am I to Say" Released: August 5, 1978

Professional ratings
Review scores
Source	Rating
Allmusic	3/5 stars

Entertainers...On and Off the Record is the eighteenth studio album by American country music group The Statler Brothers. It was released in 1978 via Mercury Records. The album peaked at number 5 on the Billboard Top Country Albums chart.

== Track listing ==
1. "Do You Know You Are My Sunshine" (Don Reid, Harold Reid) – 2:13
2. "Yours Love" (Harlan Howard) – 3:08
3. "The Best That I Can Do" (D. Reid) – 2:51
4. "You're the First" (Lew DeWitt) – 2:13
5. "Tomorrow Is Your Friend" (D. Reid) – 2:33
6. "The Official Historian on Shirley Jean Berrell" (D. Reid, H. Reid) – 2:16
7. "Who Am I to Say" (Kim Reid) – 2:06
8. "I Forgot More Than You'll Ever Know" (Cecil A. Null) – 3:11
9. "When You Are Sixty-Five" (D. Reid) – 2:38
10. "I Dreamed About You" (D. Reid) – 2:40
11. "Before the Magic Turns to Memory" (D. Reid) – 3:11

== Chart performance ==
Chart (1978)	Peak position
U.S. Billboard Top Country Albums	5
U.S. Billboard 200	155
