= George Washington Johnson (poet) =

Canadian songwriter

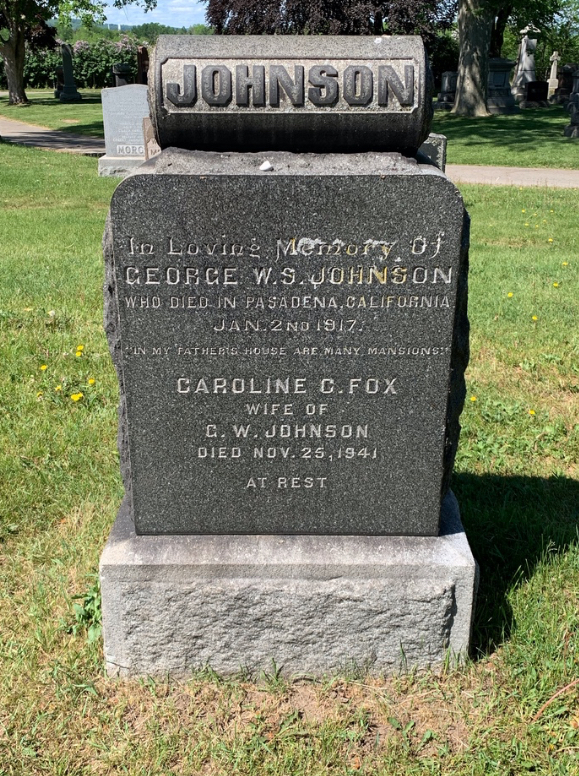
Grave of poet, George Washington Johnson, and his third wife, Caroline Fox, in the Hamilton Cemetery, Hamilton, Ontario, Canada

George Washington Johnson (1839, Binbrook, Upper Canada – 1917, Pasadena, California) was a Canadian schoolteacher and poet best known for writing the song “When You and I Were Young, Maggie,” dedicated to his first wife Maggie Clark.
