= James Austin Butterfield =

English-American composer (1837–1891)

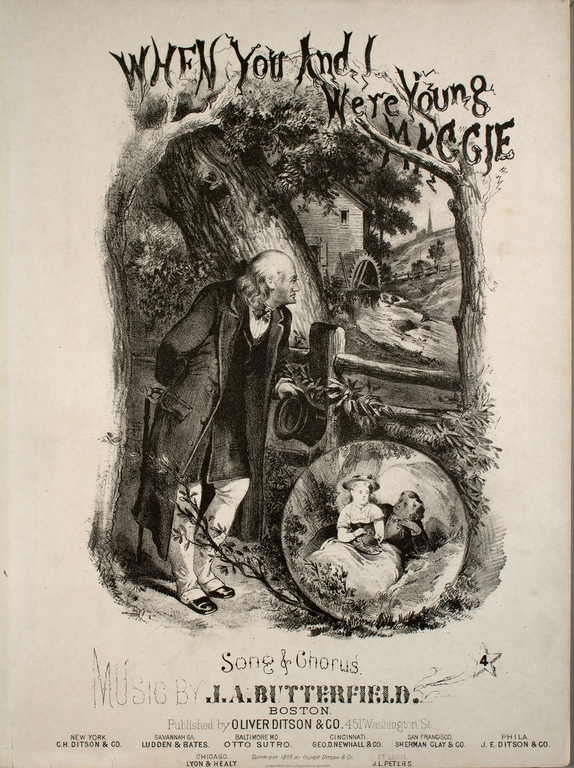
- The sheet music for J.A Butterfield When you I Were Young, Maggie

Background information
- Also known as: J.A. Butterfield
- Born: James Austin Butterfield; May 2, 1897
- Origin: Hertfordshire, England
- Died: April 8, 1985 (aged 87) New York City, U.S.
- Genres: Tin Pan Alley
- Occupation: Composer
- Instrument: Piano

James Austin Butterfield (May 18, 1837 – July 6, 1891) was an English-American composer. His best-known composition is When You and I Were Young, Maggie, first published in 1866 (lyrics by George W. Johnson). Butterfield was born in England in 1837 and emigrated to the United States in 1856.

He was also the second president of the Music Teachers National Association, in 1878.

James A. Butterfield died in Chicago, Illinois and is buried in Graceland Cemetery.
