= Woman to Woman (Shirley Brown song) =

1974 single by Shirley Brown

Single by Shirley Brown

from the album Woman to Woman
- B-side: "Yes Sir, Brother"
- Released: August 1974
- Genre: Soul
- Length: 3:53
- Label: Truth; TRA-3206
- Songwriters: Homer Banks; Eddie Marion; Henderson Thigpen
- Producers: Al Jackson Jr., Jim Stewart

Shirley Brown singles chronology
"I Ain't Gonna Tell" (1972)	"Woman to Woman" (1974)	"It Ain't No Fun" (1975)

"Woman to Woman" is the title of a 1974 deep soul single recorded by Shirley Brown for whom it was a #1 R&B hit.

Reportedly selling a million units in its first eight weeks of release, "Woman to Woman" spent two weeks at #1 on Billboard magazine's Hot Soul Singles chart in November 1974 and crossed-over to the Top 40 of the Billboard Hot 100, peaking there at #22. The song is notable for being the last big hit for Stax Records.

== Background ==
The song was written by James Banks, Eddie Marion and Henderson Thigpen, who had previously written hits for Little Milton, the Bar-Kays and other Stax Records artists. According to Thigpen, he and Banks were brainstorming ideas for songs at Stax Studio (quote:)"trying to come up with...something different. When people get serious, they say: 'Hey, let's talk man to man'...We thought it would be interesting to have a song with somebody coming up [with]: 'Hey, let's talk woman to woman'." Thigpen had recently overheard his wife on the phone arguing with a friend about an involved couple of their acquaintance, and – with Eddie Marion – Thigpen and Banks completed their "Woman to Woman" song structuring it as a phone call from a wife to her husband's mistress.

"Woman to Woman" was first offered to Inez Foxx, then signed to Stax's Volt label, who turned it down because – according to Banks – she didn't want to do the spoken intro, feeling that format could only work for a male singer. Around this time Shirley Brown was introduced to Stax president Jim Stewart by Albert King in whose live revue she'd performed while a teenager: Stewart was impressed enough by Brown to himself produce her Stax debut recording – Stewart's first production task in two years – of "Woman to Woman" (Stewart co-produced the track with Al Jackson Jr.) with Brown cutting her vocal in a single take. Brown would state in a 1975 interview (quote:)"The guys who wrote ['Woman to Woman'] sang it through to me and I felt it needed a rap to begin it, so I wrote one off the top of my head"; however the song's co-writer Homer Banks has stated that the spoken intro was part of the song when it was offered to Inez Foxx, whose dislike of the "rap" caused her to turn the song down.

== Chart history ==
Chart (1974–1975)	Peak position
Canada RPM Top Singles	38
U.S. Billboard Hot 100	22
U.S. Billboard Hot Soul Singles	1

== Answer song ==
In 1975 Barbara Mason had a hit with "From His Woman to You" which was an answer song to "Woman to Woman", the line "Barbara this is Shirley" from Brown's recording being spliced on to the opening of Mason's recording. The song debuted on the charts four weeks following Brown's hit, peaking at #28 (U.S.). On the R&B chart, it reached #3.

== Cover versions ==
In 1978, a C&W rendition of "Woman to Woman" provided a hit for Barbara Mandrell, peaking at #4 on the Billboard magazine C&W chart and crossing over to #92 on the Billboard Hot 100, marking Mandrell's first Hot 100 appearance. "Woman to Woman" was also Mandrell's first single to rank on the Billboard Adult Contemporary (aka Easy Listening) chart, where it peaked at #49. Mandrell's rendition maintained the spoken intro as heard on Brown's, with the modification that as spoken by Mandrell the intro mentions no personal names whereas Brown had opened with: "Hello may I speak to Barbara? Barbara, this is Shirley". Mandrell's rendition of "Woman to Woman" appears on her album Love's Ups and Downs.

In 1994, a cover by Jewell featured on the soundtrack to the film Murder Was the Case starring Snoop Dogg. Jewell's version sampled Shirley Brown's original and peaked at #16 on the R&B chart and #72 on the Billboard Hot 100.
