= Bed of Rose's (album) =

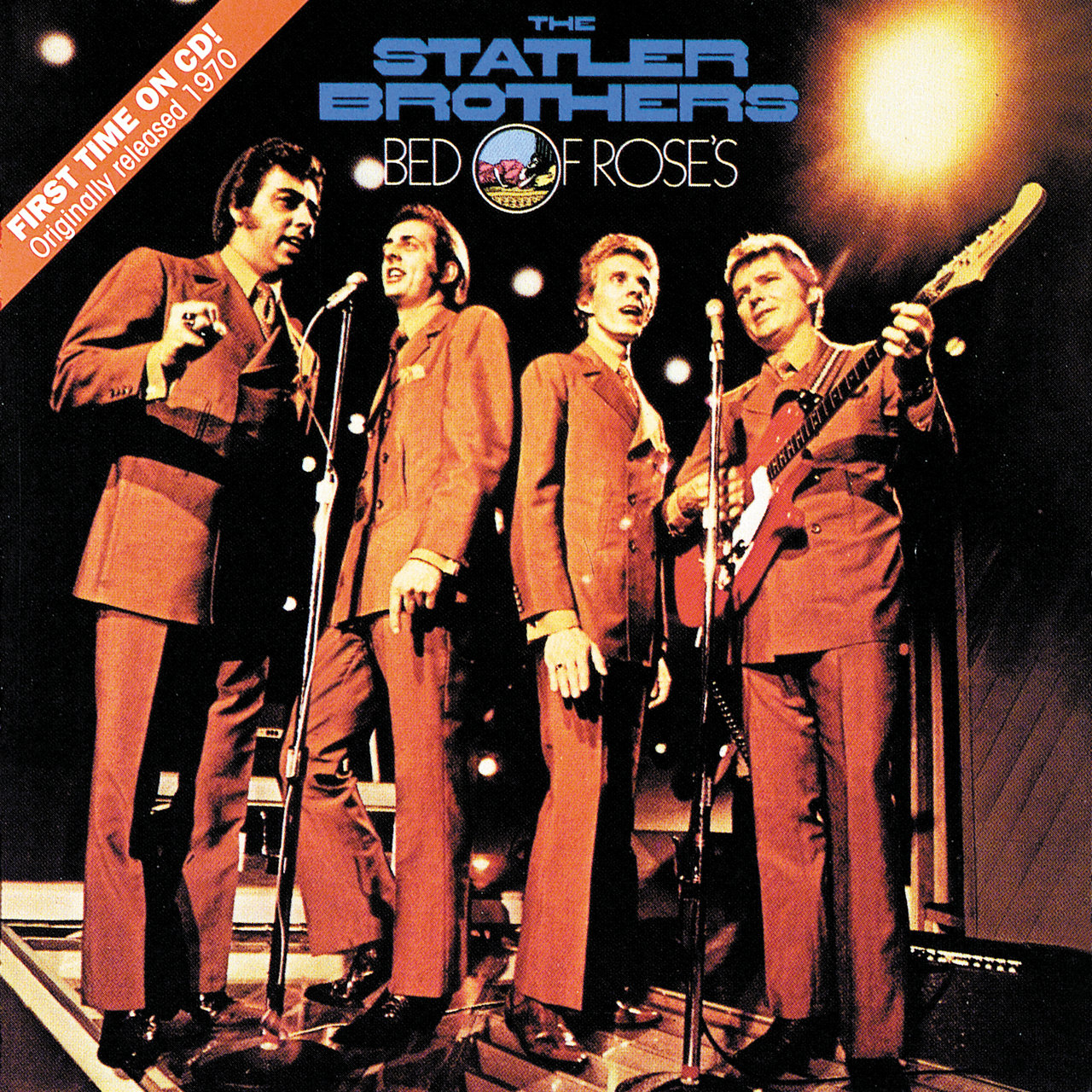

Studio album by The Statler Brothers
- Released: 1970
- Genre: Country
- Length: 33:07
- Label: Mercury
- Producer: Jerry Kennedy

The Statler Brothers chronology
How Great Thou Art (1969)	Bed of Rose's (1970)	Pictures of Moments to Remember (1971)

Singles from Bed of Rose's
- 1. "Bed of Rose's" Released: October 1970

Bed of Rose's is the fourth studio album by the Statler Brothers and the first one recorded for Mercury Records. One of two singles from the album, "Bed of Rose's" reached #9 on the Billboard Hot Country Singles chart.

== Appearances in other media ==
The songs "Bed of Rose's" and "New York City" appear in the Grand Theft Auto: San Andreas video game soundtrack, on the fictitious radio station K-Rose.

== Track listing ==
1. "Bed of Rose's" (Harold Reid)
2. "New York City" (Don Reid)
3. "All I Have to Offer You (Is Me)" (Dallas Frazier, A.L. "Doodle" Owens)
4. "Neighborhood Girl"
5. "Fifteen Years Ago" (Raymond Smith)
6. "The Junkie's Prayer" (Lew DeWitt)
7. "We"
8. "This Part of the World"
9. "Tomorrow Never Comes"
10. "Me and Bobby McGee" (Kris Kristofferson, Fred Foster)
11. "The Last Goodbye" (Phil Balsley, L. DeWitt, D. Reid, H. Reid)
