= Christmas Card (The Statler Brothers album) =

Studio album by The Statler Brothers
- Released: 1978
- Genre: Country, Christmas
- Length: 37:11
- Label: Mercury
- Producer: Jerry Kennedy

The Statler Brothers chronology
Entertainers...On and Off the Record (1978)	Christmas Card (1978)	The Originals (1979)

Professional ratings
Review scores
Source	Rating
Allmusic	4/5 stars

Christmas Card is the nineteenth studio album and the first Christmas album by American country music group The Statler Brothers. It was released in 1978 via Mercury Records. The group's first Christmas album, it peaked at number 17 on the Billboard Top Country Albums chart.

== Track listing ==
1. "I Believe in Santa's Cause" (Lew DeWitt, Buddy Church) – 2:50
2. "I'll Be Home for Christmas" (Walter Kent, Kim Gannon, Buck Ram) – 3:47
3. "Jingle Bells" (Traditional; arranged by Phil Balsley, Lew DeWitt, Don Reid, Harold Reid) – 2:54
4. "I Never Spend a Christmas That I Don't Think of You" (D. Reid) – 2:35
5. "White Christmas" (Irving Berlin) – 2:19
6. "Christmas to Me" (D. Reid, H. Reid) – 4:08
7. "Who Do You Think?" (D. Reid, H. Reid) – 2:52
8. "Away in a Manger" (Traditional; arranged by Balsley, DeWitt, D. Reid, H. Reid) – 2:45
9. "Something You Can't Buy" (D. Reid, H. Reid) – 3:17
10. "The Carols Those Kids Used to Sing" (H. Reid, D. Reid) – 2:41
11. "Medley: Silent Night/O Holy Night/The First Noel/It Came Upon the Midnight Clear/Silent Night" (Traditional; arranged by Balsley, DeWitt, D. Reid, H. Reid) – 7:03

== Chart performance ==
Chart (1978)	Peak position
U.S. Billboard Top Country Albums	17
U.S. Billboard 200	183
