= List of CMT Music Awards ceremonies =

This is a list of CMT Music Awards (and predecessors) ceremonies and the winners in each ceremony. The show began as the Music City News Awards in 1967. The award show partnered with the Grand Ole Opry-owned The Nashville Network (TNN) in 1990 to become the TNN Music City News Country Awards. After Music City News ceased publication in 1999, Country Weekly assumed the role of presenting sponsor of the awards show in 2000. In 2001, after MTV acquired CBS' cable operations, the show moved to CMT, where it was retooled and renamed to the CMT Flameworthy Video Music Awards in 2002. The name of the show was changed to CMT Music Awards in 2005. From 2022 to 2024, the show was broadcast live on CBS.

== Ceremonies ==
Below is a list of ceremonies, the years the ceremonies were held, their hosts, the television networks that aired them, and their locations:

=== CMT Music Awards ===
Year	Host(s)	Network	Venue	Source	Original air date
2024	Kelsea Ballerini	CBS	Moody Center; Austin, Texas		April 7
2023	Kelsea Ballerini and Kane Brown	CBS	Moody Center; Austin, Texas		April 2
2022	Kelsea Ballerini (virtually), Kane Brown and Anthony Mackie	CBS	Nashville Municipal Auditorium; Nashville, Tennessee		April 11
2021	Kelsea Ballerini and Kane Brown	CMT	Bridgestone Arena; Nashville, Tennessee		June 9
2020	Kane Brown, Sarah Hyland and Ashley McBryde	CMT	Outdoor Set Building Model; Nashville, Tennessee		October 21
2019	Little Big Town	CMT	Bridgestone Arena; Nashville, Tennessee		June 5
2018	Little Big Town	CMT	Bridgestone Arena; Nashville, Tennessee		June 6
2017	Charles Esten	CMT	Music City Center, Nashville, Tennessee		June 7
2016	Erin Andrews and J. J. Watt	CMT	Bridgestone Arena, Nashville, Tennessee		June 8
2015	Erin Andrews and Brittany Snow	CMT	Bridgestone Arena, Nashville, Tennessee		June 10
2014	Kristen Bell	CMT	Bridgestone Arena, Nashville, Tennessee		June 4
2013	Kristen Bell and Jason Aldean	CMT	Bridgestone Arena, Nashville, Tennessee		June 5
2012	Kristen Bell and Toby Keith	CMT	Bridgestone Arena, Nashville, Tennessee		June 6
2011	Kid Rock	CMT	Bridgestone Arena, Nashville, Tennessee		June 8
2010	Kid Rock	CMT	Bridgestone Arena, Nashville, Tennessee		June 10
2009	Bill Engvall	CMT	Bridgestone Arena, Nashville, Tennessee		June 17
2008	Billy Ray Cyrus and Miley Cyrus	CMT	Curb Event Center, Nashville, Tennessee		April 14
2007	Jeff Foxworthy	CMT	Curb Event Center, Nashville, Tennessee		April 16
2006	Jeff Foxworthy	CMT	Curb Event Center, Nashville, Tennessee		April 10
2005	Jeff Foxworthy	CMT	Bridgestone Arena, Nashville, Tennessee		April 11
2004	Dolly Parton	CMT	Bridgestone Arena, Nashville, Tennessee		April 21
2003	Pamela Anderson and Toby Keith	CMT	Bridgestone Arena, Nashville, Tennessee		April 7
2002	Kathy Najimy	CMT	Bridgestone Arena, Nashville, Tennessee		June 12

=== Music City News Awards and TNN Music City News Country Awards ===
Year	Host(s)	Network	Venue	Source	Original air date
2001	Terry Bradshaw and Lee Ann Womack	CMT/TNN	Bridgestone Arena, Nashville, Tennessee		June 13
2000	Bill Engvall	TNN	Bridgestone Arena, Nashville, Tennessee		June 15
1999	Jeff Foxworthy	TNN	Grand Ole Opry House, Nashville, Tennessee		June 14
1998	Jeff Foxworthy	TNN	Grand Ole Opry House, Nashville, Tennessee		June 15
1997	George Jones, LeAnn Rimes and Randy Travis	TNN	Grand Ole Opry House, Nashville, Tennessee		June 16
1996	Martina McBride, Mark Miller and Lorrie Morgan	TNN	Grand Ole Opry House, Nashville, Tennessee		June 10
1995	Martina McBride, Charley Pride and Marty Stuart	TNN	Grand Ole Opry House, Nashville, Tennessee		June 5
1994	Billy Dean, Waylon Jennings and Michelle Wright	TNN	Grand Ole Opry House, Nashville, Tennessee		June 6
1993	Suzy Bogguss, George Jones and Ricky Van Shelton	TNN	Grand Ole Opry House, Nashville, Tennessee		June 7
1992	Alan Jackson and Tanya Tucker	TNN	Grand Ole Opry House, Nashville, Tennessee		June 9
1991	Roy Clark and Tanya Tucker	TNN	Grand Ole Opry House, Nashville, Tennessee		June 11
1990	Jimmy Dean and Barbara Mandrell	TNN	Grand Ole Opry House, Nashville, Tennessee		June 6
1989	Barbara Mandrell, Louise Mandrell, and Irlene Mandrell	Syndication	Grand Ole Opry House, Nashville, Tennessee		June 6
1988	Barbara Mandrell and the Statler Brothers	Syndication	Grand Ole Opry House, Nashville, Tennessee		June 8
1987	Johnny Cash, Marie Osmond and Hank Williams, Jr.	Syndication	Grand Ole Opry House, Nashville, Tennessee		June 9
1986	Roy Clark, Reba McEntire, The Oak Ridge Boys, and Mel Tillis	Syndication	Grand Ole Opry House, Nashville, Tennessee		June 14
1985	Roy Clark, Marie Osmond, John Schneider, The Statler Brothers and Mel Tillis	Syndication	Grand Ole Opry House, Nashville, Tennessee		June 11
1984	Larry Gatlin, The Statler Brothers and Sylvia	Syndication	Grand Ole Opry House, Nashville, Tennessee		June 6
1983	The Statler Brothers, Louise Mandrell, and Janie Fricke	Syndication	Grand Ole Opry House, Nashville, Tennessee		
1982	The Statler Brothers, Louise Mandrell, and Ed Bruce	Syndication	Grand Ole Opry House, Nashville, Tennessee		
1981	Roy Clark, Tammy Wynette, and The Statler Brothers	Syndication	Grand Ole Opry House, Nashville, Tennessee		
1980	Ray Stevens, Lynn Anderson, and The Statler Brothers	Syndication	Grand Ole Opry House, Nashville, Tennessee		

== Categorical winners ==
Below is a list of winners in the major categories by year.

=== 2020s ===
2021 CMT Music Awards

Video of the Year:	Carrie Underwood & John Legend — "Hallelujah"
Duo/Group Video of the Year:	Little Big Town — "Wine, Beer, Whiskey"
Male Video of the Year:	Kane Brown — "Worship You"
Female Video of the Year:	Gabby Barrett — "The Good Ones"
Collaborative Video of the Year:	Chris Young & Kane Brown — "Famous Friends"
CMT Performance of the Year:	Kelsea Ballerini & Halsey — "The Other Girl" from CMT Crossroads
Breakthrough Video of the Year:	Dylan Scott — "Nobody"

2020 CMT Music Awards

Video of the Year:	Carrie Underwood - "Drinking Alone"
Duo Video of the Year:	Dan + Shay - "I Should Probably Go to Bed"
Group Video of the Year:	Old Dominion - "One Man Band"
Male Video of the Year:	Luke Bryan - "One Margarita"
Female Video of the Year:	Carrie Underwood - "Drinking Alone"
Collaborative Video of the Year:	Blake Shelton & Gwen Stefani - "Nobody but You"
CMT Performance of the Year:	Chris Young - "Drowning" from CMT Artists of the Year
Breakthrough Video of the Year:	Gabby Barrett - "I Hope"
Quarantine Video of the Year:	Granger Smith - "Don't Cough on Me"
CMT Equal Play Award	Jennifer Nettles

=== 2010s ===
2019 CMT Music Awards

Video of the Year:	Carrie Underwood — "Cry Pretty"
Duo Video of the Year:	Dan + Shay — "Speechless"
Group Video of the Year:	Zac Brown Band — "Someone I Used to Know"
Male Video of the Year:	Kane Brown — "Lose It"
Female Vocalist of the Year:	Carrie Underwood — "Love Wins"
Collaborative Video of the Year:	Keith Urban / Julia Michaels — "Coming Home"
CMT Performance of the Year:	Luke Combs and Leon Bridges — "Beautiful Crazy" from CMT Crossroads
Breakthrough Video of the Year:	Ashley McBryde — "Girl Goin' Nowhere"

2018 CMT Music Awards

Video of the Year:	Blake Shelton - "I'll Name the Dogs"
Duo Video of the Year:	Dan + Shay - "Tequila"
Group Video of the Year:	Little Big Town - "When Someone Stops Loving You"
Male Video of the Year:	Blake Shelton - "I'll Name the Dogs"
Female Video of the Year:	Carrie Underwood featuring Ludacris - "The Champion"
Collaborative Video of the Year:	Kane Brown duet Lauren Alaina - "What Ifs"
CMT Performance of the Year:	Backstreet Boys and Florida Georgia Line - "Everybody (Backstreet's Back)" from CMT Crossroads
Breakthrough Video of the Year:	Carly Pearce - "Every Little Thing"

2017 CMT Music Awards

Video of the Year:	Keith Urban – "Blue Ain't Your Color"
Duo Video of the Year:	Florida Georgia Line – "H.O.L.Y."
Group Video of the Year:	Little Big Town – "Better Man"
Social Superstar of the Year:	Keith Urban
Male Video of the Year:	Keith Urban – "Blue Ain't Your Color"
Female Video of the Year:	Carrie Underwood – "Church Bells"
Collaborative Video of the Year:	Keith Urban featuring Carrie Underwood – "The Fighter"
CMT Performance of the Year:	Jason Derulo and Luke Bryan – "Want to Want Me" from CMT Crossroads
Breakthrough Video of the Year:	Lauren Alaina – "Road Less Traveled"

2016 CMT Music Awards

Video of the Year:	Tim McGraw – "Humble and Kind"
Group/Duo Video of the Year	Little Big Town – "Girl Crush"
Social Superstar of the Year	Blake Shelton
Male Video of the Year:	Thomas Rhett – "Die a Happy Man"
Female Video of the Year:	Carrie Underwood – "Smoke Break"
CMT Performance of the Year:	Carrie Underwood – "Smoke Break" from CMT Instant Jam
Breakthrough Video of the Year:	Chris Stapleton – "Fire Away"

- In 2016, Collaborative Video of the Year did not nominated.

2015 CMT Music Awards

Video of the Year:	Carrie Underwood – "Something in the Water"
Duo Video of the Year:	Florida Georgia Line – "Dirt"
Group Video of the Year	Lady Antebellum – "Bartender"
Male Video of the Year:	Luke Bryan – "Play It Again"
Female Video of the Year:	Carrie Underwood – "Something in the Water"
Collaborative Video of the Year:	Miranda Lambert with Carrie Underwood – "Somethin' Bad"
CMT Performance of the Year:	Bob Seger & Jason Aldean – "Turn the Page" from CMT Crossroads
Breakthrough Video of the Year:	Sam Hunt – "Leave the Night On"

2014 CMT Music Awards

Video of the Year:	Carrie Underwood – "See You Again"
Duo Video of the Year:	Florida Georgia Line – "Round Here"
Group Video of the Year	The Band Perry – "DONE."
Male Video of the Year:	Blake Shelton – "Doin' What She Likes"
Female Video of the Year:	Miranda Lambert – "Automatic"
Collaborative Video of the Year:	Florida Georgia Line feat. Luke Bryan – "This Is How We Roll"
CMT Performance of the Year:	Luke Bryan & Lionel Richie – "Oh No"/"All Night Long (All Night)" from 2013 CMT Artists of the Year
USA Weekend Breakthrough Video of the Year:	Cassadee Pope – "Wasting All These Tears"
CMT Impact Award:	Alan Jackson

2013 CMT Music Awards

Video of the Year:	Carrie Underwood – "Blown Away"
Duo Video of the Year:	Florida Georgia Line – "Cruise"
Group Video of the Year:	Lady Antebellum – "Downtown"
Male Video of the Year:	Blake Shelton – "Sure Be Cool If You Did"
Female Video of the Year:	Miranda Lambert – "Mama's Broken Heart"
Collaborative Video of the Year:	Jason Aldean with Luke Bryan and Eric Church – "The Only Way I Know"
CMT Performance of the Year:	Miranda Lambert – "Over You" from CMT Artists of the Year
USA Weekend Breakthrough Video of the Year:	Florida Georgia Line – "Cruise"
Nationwide Insurance On Your Side Award:	Hunter Hayes

2012 CMT Music Awards

Video of the Year:	Carrie Underwood – "Good Girl"
Duo Video of the Year:	Thompson Square – "I Got You"
Group Video of the Year:	Lady Antebellum – "We Owned the Night"
Male Video of the Year:	Luke Bryan – "I Don't Want This Night to End"
Female Video of the Year:	Miranda Lambert – "Over You"
Collaborative Video of the Year:	Brad Paisley with Carrie Underwood – "Remind Me"
CMT Performance of the Year:	Jason Aldean – "Tattoos on This Town" from CMT Artists of the Year
USA Weekend Breakthrough Video of the Year:	Scotty McCreery – "The Trouble with Girls"

2011 CMT Music Awards

Video of the Year:	Taylor Swift – "Mine"
Male Video of the Year:	Blake Shelton – "Who Are You When I'm Not Looking"
Group Video of the Year:	Lady Antebellum – "Hello World"
Female Video of the Year:	Miranda Lambert – "The House That Built Me"
CMT Performance of the Year:	Jimmy Buffett with Zac Brown Band – "Margaritaville" from CMT Crossroads
USA Weekend Breakthrough Video of the Year:	The Band Perry – "If I Die Young"
Collaborative Video of the Year:	Justin Bieber featuring Rascal Flatts – "That Should Be Me"
Duo Video of the Year:	Sugarland – "Stuck Like Glue"
Web Video of the Year:	Blake Shelton – "Kiss My Country Ass"
Video Director of the Year:	Trey Fanjoy
Nationwide is On Your Side Award:	The Band Perry

2010 CMT Music Awards

Video of the Year:	Carrie Underwood – "Cowboy Casanova"
Female Video of the Year:	Miranda Lambert – "White Liar"
Male Video of the Year:	Keith Urban – "'Til Summer Comes Around"
Collaborative Video of the Year:	Blake Shelton featuring Trace Adkins – "Hillbilly Bone"
CMT Performance of the Year:	Carrie Underwood – "Temporary Home" from CMT Invitation Only
USA Weekend Breakthrough Video of the Year:	Luke Bryan – "Do I"
Video Director of the Year:	Shaun Silva
Duo Video of the Year:	Brooks & Dunn – "Indian Summer"
Group Video of the Year:	Lady Antebellum – "Need You Now"
Nationwide is On Your Side Award:	Chris Young

=== 2000s ===
2009 CMT Music Awards

Video of the Year:	Taylor Swift – "Love Story"
Male Video of the Year:	Brad Paisley – "Waitin' on a Woman"
Collaborative Video of the Year:	Brad Paisley featuring Keith Urban – "Start a Band"
Female Video of the Year:	Taylor Swift – "Love Story"
Performance of the Year:	Alan Jackson featuring George Strait, Brad Paisley and Dierks Bentley – "Country Boy"
Video Director of the Year:	Trey Fanjoy
Group Video of the Year:	Rascal Flatts – "Every Day"
Wide Open Country Video of the Year:	Kid Rock – "All Summer Long"
Duo Video of the Year:	Sugarland – "All I Want to Do"
USA Weekend Breakthrough Video of the Year:	Zac Brown Band – "Chicken Fried"
Nationwide is on Your Side Award:	Gloriana

2008 CMT Music Awards

Video of the Year:	Taylor Swift – "Our Song"
Duo Video of the Year:	Sugarland – "Stay"
Male Video of the Year:	Trace Adkins – "I Got My Game On"
Wide Open Country Video of the Year:	Alison Krauss and Robert Plant – "Gone, Gone, Gone (Done Moved On)"
Collaborative Video of the Year:	Bon Jovi featuring LeAnn Rimes – "Till We Ain't Strangers Anymore"
Female Video of the Year:	Taylor Swift – "Our Song"
Performance of the Year:	Kellie Pickler – "I Wonder" at Country Music Association Awards (ABC)
Comedy Video of the Year:	Brad Paisley – "Online"
Tearjerker Video of the Year:	Kellie Pickler – "I Wonder"
Supporting Character of the Year:	Rodney Carrington – "I Got My Game On"
Video Director of the Year:	Michael Salomon
USA Weekend Breakthrough Video of the Year:	Kellie Pickler – "I Wonder"
Group Video of the Year:	Rascal Flatts – "Take Me There"

2007 CMT Music Awards

Video of the Year:	Carrie Underwood – "Before He Cheats"
Group Video of the Year:	Rascal Flatts – "What Hurts the Most"
Male Video of the Year:	Kenny Chesney – "You Save Me"
Wide Open Country Video of the Year:	Jack Ingram – "Love You"
Johnny Cash Visionary Award:	Kris Kristofferson
Female Video of the Year:	Carrie Underwood – "Before He Cheats"
Video Director of the Year:	Roman White – 'Carrie Underwood – "Before He Cheats"'
Duo Video of the Year:	Sugarland – "Want To"
Breakthrough Video of the Year:	Taylor Swift – "Tim McGraw"

2006 CMT Music Awards

Video of the Year:	Keith Urban – "Better Life"
Most Inspiring Video of the Year:	Brad Paisley Featuring Dolly Parton – "When I Get Where I'm Going"
Male Video of the Year:	Kenny Chesney – "Who You'd Be Today"
Female Video of the Year:	Carrie Underwood – "Jesus, Take the Wheel"
Johnny Cash Visionary Award:	Hank Williams, Jr.
Video Director of the Year:	Sophie Muller – 'Faith Hill Featuring Tim McGraw – "Like We Never Loved at All"'
Collaborative Video of the Year:	Bon Jovi Featuring Jennifer Nettles – "Who Says You Can't Go Home"
Group/Duo Video of the Year:	Rascal Flatts – "Skin (Sarabeth)"
Hottest Video of the Year:	Billy Currington – "Must Be Doin' Somethin' Right"
Breakthrough Video of the Year:	Carrie Underwood – "Jesus, Take the Wheel"

2005 CMT Music Awards

Video of the Year:	Keith Urban – "Days Go By"
Male Video of the Year:	Kenny Chesney – "I Go Back"
Johnny Cash Visionary Award:	Loretta Lynn
Group/Duo Video of the Year:	Rascal Flatts – "Feels Like Today"
Female Video of the Year:	Gretchen Wilson – "When I Think About Cheatin'"
Video Director of the Year:	Rick Schroder – 'Brad Paisley Featuring Alison Krauss – "Whiskey Lullaby"'
Collaborative Video of the Year:	Brad Paisley Featuring Alison Krauss – "Whiskey Lullaby"
Hottest Video of the Year:	Toby Keith – "Whiskey Girl"
Most Inspiring Video of the Year:	Tim McGraw – "Live Like You Were Dying"
Breakthrough Video of the Year:	Gretchen Wilson – "Redneck Woman"

2004 CMT Flameworthy Video Music Awards

Video of the Year:	Toby Keith – "American Soldier"
Male Video of the Year:	Kenny Chesney – "There Goes My Life"
Johnny Cash Visionary Award:	Reba McEntire
Group/Duo Video of the Year:	Rascal Flatts – "I Melt"
Female Video of the Year:	Shania Twain – "Forever and for Always"
Video Director of the Year:	Michael Salomon – 'Toby Keith and Willie Nelson – "Beer for My Horses"'
Collaborative Video of the Year:	Toby Keith and Willie Nelson – "Beer for My Horses"
Hottest Video of the Year:	Kenny Chesney – "No Shoes, No Shirt, No Problems"
Cameo of the Year:	The Cast of Celebrity – Jason Alexander, James Belushi, Little Jimmy Dickens, Trista Rehn, William Shatner, Brad Paisley "Celebrity"
Breakthrough Video of the Year:	Dierks Bentley – "What Was I Thinkin'"

2003 CMT Flameworthy Video Music Awards

Video of the Year:	Toby Keith – "Courtesy of the Red, White and Blue (The Angry American)"
Male Video of the Year:	Toby Keith – "Courtesy of the Red, White and Blue (The Angry American)"
Special Achievement Award:	Johnny Cash
Group/Duo Video of the Year:	Rascal Flatts – "These Days"
Female Video of the Year:	Martina McBride – "Concrete Angel"
Video Director of the Year:	Deaton Flanigen – 'Martina McBride – "Concrete Angel"'
Cocky Video of the Year:	Toby Keith – "Courtesy of the Red, White and Blue (The Angry American)"
Concept Video of the Year:	Shania Twain – "I'm Gonna Getcha Good!"
Fashion Plate Video of the Year:	Tim McGraw – "She's My Kind of Rain"
Hottest Female Video of the Year:	Faith Hill – "When the Lights Go Down"
Hottest Male Video of the Year:	Tim McGraw – "She's My Kind of Rain"
Breakthrough Video of the Year:	Joe Nichols – "Brokenheartsville"

2002 CMT Flameworthy Video Music Awards

Video Visionary Award:	Dixie Chicks
Video of the Year:	Kenny Chesney – "Young"
Male Video of the Year:	Kenny Chesney – "Young"
Female Video of the Year:	Martina McBride – "Blessed"
Group / Duo Video of the Year:	Brooks & Dunn – "Only in America"
Concept Video of the Year:	Brad Paisley – "I'm Gonna Miss Her (The Fishin' Song)"
Breakthrough Video of the Year:	Chris Cagle – "I Breathe In, I Breathe Out"
Hottest Video of the Year:	Tim McGraw – "The Cowboy in Me"
Fashion Plate Video of the Year:	Chely Wright – "Jezebel"
"LOL" (Laugh Out Loud) Video of the Year:	Toby Keith – "I Wanna Talk About Me"
Love Your Country Video of the Year:	Alan Jackson – "Where Were You (When the World Stopped Turning)"
Video Collaboration of the Year:	Willie Nelson Featuring Lee Ann Womack – "Mendocino County Line"
Video Director of the Year:	Michael Salomon – Toby Keith – "I Wanna Talk About Me"'

2001 TNN & CMT Country Weekly Music Awards

Entertainer of the Year:	George Strait
Male Artist of the Year:	Alan Jackson
Female Artist of the Year:	Faith Hill
Group/Duo of the Year:	Dixie Chicks
Album of the Year:	When Somebody Loves You – Alan Jackson
Single of the Year:	"Murder on Music Row" – George Strait and Alan Jackson
Song of the Year:	"Murder on Music Row" – Larry Cordle and Larry Shell
CMT Video of the Year:	"www.memory" – Alan Jackson
Career Achievement Award:	Vince Gill
Discovery Award:	Billy Gilman
Fast Track Award:	Kenny Chesney
Impact Award:	George Strait
Minnie Pearl Award:	Kathy Mattea

2000 Country Weekly Presents the TNN Music Awards

Entertainer of the Year:	George Strait
Male Artist of the Year:	George Strait
Female Artist of the Year:	Faith Hill
Group/Duo of the Year:	Dixie Chicks
Album of the Year:	Always Never the Same – George Strait
Single of the Year:	"Write This Down" – George Strait
Song of the Year:	"He Didn't Have to Be" – Brad Paisley and Kelley Lovelace
CMT Video of the Year:	"He Didn't Have to Be" – Brad Paisley
Collaborative Event of the Year	"When I Said I Do" – Clint Black and Lisa Hartman Black
Career Achievement Award:	Kenny Rogers
Discovery Award:	Brad Paisley
Fast Track Award:	Steve Wariner
Impact Award:	George Strait
Minnie Pearl Award:	Alabama

=== 1990s ===
1999 TNN Music City News Country Awards

Entertainer of the Year:	Neal McCoy
Male Artist of the Year:	Tim McGraw
Female Artist of the Year:	Faith Hill
Vocal Band of the Year:	Dixie Chicks
Vocal Duo of the Year:	Brooks & Dunn
Male Star of Tomorrow:	Michael Peterson
Female Star of Tomorrow:	Dixie Chicks
Album of the Year:	One Step at a Time – George Strait
Single of the Year:	"This Kiss" – Faith Hill
Song of the Year:	"Just to Hear You Say That You Love Me" – Diane Warren
Video of the Year:	"This Kiss" – Faith Hill
Vocal Collaboration of the Year:	"Just to Hear You Say That You Love Me" – Faith Hill and Tim McGraw
Living Legend Award:	Charlie Daniels
Minnie Pearl Award:	Roy Clark

1998 TNN Music City News Country Awards

Entertainer of the Year:	Neal McCoy
Male Artist of the Year:	Billy Ray Cyrus
Female Artist of the Year:	Lorrie Morgan
Vocal Band of the Year:	Sawyer Brown
Vocal Duo/Group of the Year:	Brooks & Dunn
Comedian of the Year:	Gary Chapman
Male Star of Tomorrow:	Trace Adkins
Female Star of Tomorrow:	Lee Ann Womack
Album of the Year:	The Best of Billy Ray Cyrus: Cover to Cover – Billy Ray Cyrus
Single of the Year:	"It's All the Same to Me" – Billy Ray Cyrus
Song of the Year:	"It's All the Same to Me" – Jerry Laseter and Kerry Kurt Phillips
Video of the Year:	"Three Little Words" – Billy Ray Cyrus
Vocal Collaboration of the Year:	"What If I Said" – Anita Cochran and Steve Wariner
Living Legend Award:	Porter Wagoner
Minnie Pearl Award:	Reba McEntire

1997 TNN Music City News Country Awards

Entertainer of the Year:	Alan Jackson
Male Artist of the Year:	Alan Jackson
Female Artist of the Year:	Lorrie Morgan
Vocal Band of the Year:	Sawyer Brown
Vocal Group of the Year:	The Statler Brothers
Vocal Duo of the Year:	Brooks & Dunn
Christian Country Artist of the Year:	Ricky Van Shelton
Comedian of the Year:	Jeff Foxworthy
Male Star of Tomorrow:	Wade Hayes
Female Star of Tomorrow:	LeAnn Rimes
Album of the Year:	Blue Clear Sky – George Strait
Single of the Year:	"Trail of Tears" – Billy Ray Cyrus
Video of the Year:	"Then You Can Tell Me Goodbye" – Neal McCoy
Vocal Collaboration of the Year:	"By My Side" – Lorrie Morgan and Jon Randall
Living Legend Award:	Charley Pride
Minnie Pearl Award:	George Lindsey

1996 TNN Music City News Country Awards

Entertainer of the Year:	Alan Jackson
Male Artist of the Year:	Alan Jackson
Female Artist of the Year:	Lorrie Morgan
Vocal Band of the Year:	Sawyer Brown
Vocal Group of the Year:	The Statler Brothers
Vocal Duo of the Year:	Brooks & Dunn
Christian Country Artist of the Year:	Ricky Van Shelton
Comedian of the Year:	Jeff Foxworthy
Male Star of Tomorrow:	Bryan White
Female Star of Tomorrow:	Terri Clark
Album of the Year:	Lead On – George Strait
Single of the Year:	"Check Yes or No" – George Strait
Video of the Year:	"Check Yes or No" – George Strait
Vocal Collaboration of the Year:	"Go Rest High on That Mountain" – Vince Gill, Patty Loveless and Ricky Skaggs
Living Legend Award:	Willie Nelson
Minnie Pearl Award:	Amy Grant

1995 TNN Music City News Country Awards

Entertainer of the Year:	Alan Jackson
Male Artist of the Year:	Alan Jackson
Female Artist of the Year:	Reba McEntire
Vocal Band of the Year:	Sawyer Brown
Vocal Group or Duo of the Year:	Brooks & Dunn
Christian Country Artist of the Year:	Ricky Van Shelton
Comedian of the Year:	Jeff Foxworthy
Male Star of Tomorrow:	Tim McGraw
Female Star of Tomorrow:	Faith Hill
Vocal Group or Duo of Tomorrow:	BlackHawk
Album of the Year:	Who I Am – Alan Jackson
Single of the Year:	"Livin' on Love" – Alan Jackson
Video of the Year:	"Independence Day" – Martina McBride
Vocal Collaboration of the Year:	"Good Year for the Roses" – George Jones and Alan Jackson
Living Legend Award:	Waylon Jennings
Minnie Pearl Award:	Willie Nelson

1994 TNN Music City News Country Awards

Entertainer of the Year:	Alan Jackson
Male Artist of the Year:	Alan Jackson
Female Artist of the Year:	Lorrie Morgan
Vocal Band of the Year:	Sawyer Brown
Vocal Group of the Year:	The Statler Brothers
Vocal Duo of the Year:	Brooks & Dunn
Christian Country Artist of the Year:	Paul Overstreet
Comedian of the Year:	Ray Stevens
Instrumentalist of the Year:	Vince Gill
Star of Tomorrow:	John Michael Montgomery
Album of the Year:	A Lot About Livin' (And a Little 'Bout Love) – Alan Jackson
Single of the Year:	"Chattahoochee" – Alan Jackson
Video of the Year:	"Chattahoochee" – Alan Jackson
Vocal Collaboration of the Year:	"Does He Love You" – Reba McEntire and Linda Davis
Living Legend Award:	Dolly Parton
Minnie Pearl Award:	Dolly Parton

1993 TNN Music City News Country Awards

Entertainer of the Year:	Alan Jackson
Male Artist of the Year:	Alan Jackson
Female Artist of the Year:	Reba McEntire
Vocal Band of the Year:	Sawyer Brown
Vocal Group of the Year:	The Statler Brothers
Vocal Duo of the Year:	Brooks & Dunn
Comedian of the Year:	Ray Stevens
Gospel Act of the Year:	The Chuck Wagon Gang
Instrumentalist of the Year:	Vince Gill
Star of Tomorrow:	Doug Stone
Album of the Year:	I Still Believe in You – Vince Gill
Single of the Year:	"I Still Believe in You" – Vince Gill
Video of the Year:	"Midnight in Montgomery" – Alan Jackson
Vocal Collaboration of the Year:	"The Whiskey Ain't Workin'" – Marty Stuart and Travis Tritt
Living Legend Award:	Kitty Wells
Minnie Pearl Award:	Vince Gill

1992 TNN Music City News Country Awards

Entertainer of the Year:	Garth Brooks
Male Artist of the Year:	Alan Jackson
Female Artist of the Year:	Reba McEntire
Vocal Group of the Year:	The Statler Brothers
Vocal Duo of the Year:	The Judds
Comedian of the Year:	Ray Stevens
Gospel Act of the Year:	The Chuck Wagon Gang
Instrumentalist of the Year:	Vince Gill
Star of Tomorrow:	Travis Tritt
Album of the Year:	Don't Rock the Jukebox – Alan Jackson
Single of the Year:	"Don't Rock the Jukebox" – Alan Jackson
Video of the Year:	"Rockin' Years" – Dolly Parton and Ricky Van Shelton
Vocal Collaboration of the Year:	"Rockin' Years" – Dolly Parton and Ricky Van Shelton
Living Legend Award:	Roy Rogers
Minnie Pearl Award:	Emmylou Harris

1991 TNN Music City News Country Awards

Entertainer of the Year:	Ricky Van Shelton
Male Artist of the Year:	Ricky Van Shelton
Female Artist of the Year:	Reba McEntire
Vocal Group of the Year:	The Statler Brothers
Vocal Duo of the Year:	The Judds
Comedian of the Year:	Ray Stevens
Gospel Act of the Year:	The Chuck Wagon Gang
Instrumentalist of the Year:	Vince Gill
Star of Tomorrow:	Alan Jackson
Album of the Year:	Here in the Real World – Alan Jackson
Single of the Year:	"When I Call Your Name" – Vince Gill
Video of the Year:	"The Dance" – Garth Brooks
Vocal Collaboration of the Year:	"'Til a Tear Becomes a Rose" – Keith Whitley and Lorrie Morgan
Living Legend Award:	Tammy Wynette
Minnie Pearl Award:	Barbara Mandrell

1990 TNN Music City News Country Awards

Entertainer of the Year:	Ricky Van Shelton
Male Artist of the Year:	Ricky Van Shelton
Female Artist of the Year:	Patty Loveless
Vocal Group of the Year:	The Statler Brothers
Vocal Duo of the Year:	The Judds
Comedian of the Year:	Ray Stevens
Gospel Act of the Year:	The Chuck Wagon Gang
Instrumentalist of the Year:	Ricky Skaggs
Star of Tomorrow:	Clint Black
Album of the Year:	Killin' Time – Clint Black
Single of the Year:	"More Than a Name on a Wall" – The Statler Brothers
Video of the Year:	"There's a Tear in My Beer" – Hank Williams, Jr. and Hank Williams
Vocal Collaboration of the Year:	"There's a Tear in My Beer" – Hank Williams, Jr. and Hank Williams
Living Legend Award:	Merle Haggard
Minnie Pearl Award:	Tennessee Ernie Ford

=== 1980s ===
1989 Music City News Awards

Entertainer of the Year:	Randy Travis
Male Artist of the Year:	Ricky Van Shelton
Female Artist of the Year:	Reba McEntire
Vocal Group of the Year:	The Statler Brothers
Vocal Duo of the Year:	The Judds
Comedian of the Year:	Ray Stevens
Gospel Act of the Year:	The Whites
Instrumentalist of the Year:	Ricky Skaggs
Star of Tomorrow:	Patty Loveless
Album of the Year:	Loving Proof – Ricky Van Shelton
Single of the Year:	"I'll Leave This World Loving You" – Ricky Van Shelton
Video of the Year:	"I'll Leave This World Loving You" – Ricky Van Shelton
Vocal Collaboration of the Year:	"Streets of Bakersfield" – Dwight Yoakam and Buck Owens
TV series of the year:	Nashville Now
TV special of the Year:	A Country Music Celebration: 30th Anniversary of the Country Music Association
Living Legend Award:	Johnny Cash

1988 Music City News Awards

Entertainer of the Year:	Randy Travis
Male Artist of the Year:	Randy Travis
Female Artist of the Year:	Reba McEntire
Vocal Group of the Year:	The Statler Brothers
Vocal Duo of the Year:	The Judds
Comedian of the Year:	Ray Stevens
Gospel Act of the Year:	The Chuck Wagon Gang
Instrumentalist of the Year:	Ricky Skaggs
Star of Tomorrow:	Ricky Van Shelton
Album of the Year:	Always & Forever – Randy Travis
Single of the Year:	"Forever and Ever, Amen" – Randy Travis
Video of the Year:	"Maple Street Memories" – The Statler Brothers
Vocal Collaboration of the Year:	Trio – Dolly Parton, Linda Ronstadt and Emmylou Harris
TV series of the year:	Nashville Now
TV special of the Year:	Grand Ole Opry Live
Living Legend Award:	Conway Twitty

1987 Music City News Awards

Entertainer of the Year:	The Statler Brothers
Male Artist of the Year:	Randy Travis
Female Artist of the Year:	Reba McEntire
Vocal Group of the Year:	The Statler Brothers
Duet of the Year:	The Judds
Comedian of the Year:	Ray Stevens
Gospel Act of the Year:	The Hee Haw Gospel Quartet
Instrumentalist of the Year:	Ricky Skaggs
Star of Tomorrow:	Randy Travis
Album of the Year:	Storms of Life – Randy Travis
Single of the Year:	"On the Other Hand" – Randy Travis
Video of the Year:	"Whoever's in New England" – Reba McEntire
TV series of the year:	Nashville Now
TV special of the Year:	The Statlers Christmas Present
Living Legend Award:	George Jones

1986 Music City News Awards

Entertainer of the Year:	The Statler Brothers
Male Artist of the Year:	George Strait
Female Artist of the Year:	Reba McEntire
Vocal Group of the Year:	The Statler Brothers
Vocal Duo of the Year:	The Judds
Comedian of the Year:	Ray Stevens
Gospel Act of the Year:	The Hee Haw Gospel Quartet
Star of Tomorrow:	John Schneider
Album of the Year:	Pardners in Rhyme – The Statler Brothers
Single of the Year:	"My Only Love" – The Statler Brothers
Video of the Year:	"My Only Love" – The Statler Brothers
TV series of the year:	Nashville Now
TV special of the Year:	Farm Aid
Living Legend Award:	Loretta Lynn

1985 Music City News Awards

Entertainer of the Year:	The Statler Brothers
Male Artist of the Year:	Lee Greenwood
Female Artist of the Year:	Reba McEntire
Vocal Group of the Year:	The Statler Brothers
Duet of the Year:	The Judds
Comedy Act of the Year:	The Statler Brothers
Gospel Act of the Year:	The Hee Haw Gospel Quartet
Star of Tomorrow:	The Judds
Album of the Year:	Atlanta Blue – The Statler Brothers
Single of the Year:	"God Bless the USA" – Lee Greenwood
Video of the Year:	"Elizabeth" – The Statler Brothers
TV series of the year:	Nashville Now
TV special of the Year:	Another Evening with the Statler Brothers – Heroes, Legends and Friends
Living Legend Award:	Barbara Mandrell

1984 Music City News Awards

Male Artist of the Year:	Lee Greenwood
Female Artist of the Year:	Janie Fricke
Vocal Group of the Year:	The Statler Brothers
Duet of the Year:	Dolly Parton and Kenny Rogers
Band of the Year:	Alabama
Bluegrass Act of the Year:	Ricky Skaggs
Comedy Act of the Year:	The Statler Brothers
Gospel Act of the Year:	The Hee Haw Gospel Quartet
Star of Tomorrow:	Ronny Robbins
Album of the Year:	The Closer You Get... – Alabama
Single of the Year:	"Elizabeth" – The Statler Brothers
TV series of the year:	Hee Haw
TV special of the Year:	Another Evening with the Statler Brothers – Heroes, Legends and Friends
Living Legend Award:	Ernest Tubb

1983 Music City News Awards

Male Artist of the Year:	Marty Robbins
Female Artist of the Year:	Janie Fricke
Vocal Group of the Year:	Alabama
Duet of the Year:	David Frizzell and Shelly West
Band of the Year:	Alabama
Bluegrass Act of the Year:	Ricky Skaggs
Comedy Act of the Year:	The Statler Brothers
Gospel Act of the Year:	The Hee Haw Gospel Quartet
Star of Tomorrow:	Ricky Skaggs
Album of the Year:	Come Back to Me – Marty Robbins
Single of the Year:	"Some Memories Just Won't Die" – Marty Robbins
TV series of the year:	Hee Haw
TV special of the Year:	Conway Twitty on the Mississippi
Living Legend Award:	Roy Acuff

1982 Music City News Awards

Male Artist of the Year:	Marty Robbins
Female Artist of the Year:	Barbara Mandrell
Vocal Group of the Year:	The Statler Brothers
Duet of the Year:	David Frizzell and Shelly West
Band of the Year:	Alabama
Bluegrass Group of the Year:	Ricky Skaggs
Comedy Act of the Year:	The Statler Brothers
Gospel Act of the Year:	The Hee Haw Gospel Quartet
Most Promising Male Artist:	T. G. Sheppard
Most Promising Female Artist:	Shelly West
Album of the Year:	Feels So Right – Alabama
Single of the Year:	"Elvira" – The Oak Ridge Boys
TV show of the Year:	Barbara Mandrell & the Mandrell Sisters

1981 Music City News Awards

Male Artist of the Year:	George Jones
Female Artist of the Year:	Barbara Mandrell
Vocal Group of the Year:	The Statler Brothers
Duet of the Year:	Conway Twitty and Loretta Lynn
Band of the Year:	Marty Robbins Band
Bluegrass Group of the Year:	Bill Monroe and the Bluegrass Boys
Comedy Act of the Year:	The Mandrell Sisters
Gospel Act of the Year:	The Hee Haw Gospel Quartet
Most Promising Male Artist:	Boxcar Willie
Most Promising Female Artist:	Louise Mandrell
Album of the Year:	10th Anniversary – The Statler Brothers
Single of the Year:	"He Stopped Loving Her Today" – George Jones
TV show of the Year:	Barbara Mandrell & the Mandrell Sisters
Founder's Award:	Betty Cox Adler

1980 Music City News Awards

Male Artist of the Year:	Marty Robbins
Female Artist of the Year:	Loretta Lynn
Vocal Group of the Year:	The Statler Brothers
Duet of the Year:	Conway Twitty and Loretta Lynn
Band of the Year:	The Charlie Daniels Band
Bluegrass Group of the Year:	Bill Monroe and the Bluegrass Boys
Comedy Act of the Year:	The Statler Brothers
Gospel Act of the Year:	The Carter Family
Most Promising Male Artist:	Hank Williams, Jr.
Most Promising Female Artist:	Charly McClain
Album of the Year:	The Originals – The Statler Brothers
Single of the Year:	"Coward of the County" – Kenny Rogers
Songwriter of the Year:	Marty Robbins
TV show of the Year:	PBS Live from the Grand Ole Opry
Founder's Award:	Buck Owens

=== 1970s ===
1979 Music City News Awards

Male Artist of the Year:	Kenny Rogers
Female Artist of the Year:	Barbara Mandrell
Vocal Group of the Year:	The Statler Brothers
Duet of the Year:	Kenny Rogers and Dottie West
Band of the Year:	The Oak Ridge Boys Band
Bluegrass Group of the Year:	Osborne Brothers
Comedy Act of the Year:	Jerry Clower
Gospel Act of the Year:	Connie Smith
Most Promising Male Artist:	Rex Allen, Jr.
Most Promising Female Artist:	Janie Fricke
Album of the Year:	Entertainers On and Off the Record – The Statler Brothers
Single of the Year:	"The Gambler" – Kenny Rogers
Songwriter of the Year:	Eddie Rabbitt
TV show of the Year:	PBS Live from the Grand Ole Opry
Founder's Award:	Pee Wee King

1978 Music City News Awards

Male Artist of the Year:	Larry Gatlin
Female Artist of the Year:	Loretta Lynn
Vocal Group of the Year:	The Statler Brothers
Duet of the Year:	Conway Twitty and Loretta Lynn
Band of the Year:	Larry Gatlin, Family & Friends
Bluegrass Group of the Year:	Osborne Brothers
Comedy Act of the Year:	Mel Tillis
Most Promising Male Artist:	Don Williams
Most Promising Female Artist:	Debby Boone
Album of the Year:	Moody Blue – Elvis Presley
Single of the Year:	"Heaven's Just a Sin Away" – The Kendalls
Songwriter of the Year:	Larry Gatlin
TV show of the Year:	50 Years of Country Music
Founder's Award:	Ernest Tubb

1977 Music City News Awards

Male Artist of the Year:	Conway Twitty
Female Artist of the Year:	Loretta Lynn
Vocal Group of the Year:	The Statler Brothers
Duet of the Year:	Conway Twitty and Loretta Lynn
Band of the Year:	The Coalminers
Instrumentist of the Year:	Johnny Gimble
Instrumentist Entertainer of the Year:	Roy Clark
Bluegrass Group of the Year:	Osborne Brothers
Comedy Act of the Year:	Mel Tillis
Most Promising Male Artist:	Larry Gatlin
Most Promising Female Artist:	Helen Cornelius
Album of the Year:	I Don't Want to Have to Marry You – Jim Ed Brown and Helen Cornelius
Song of the Year:	"I Don't Want to Have to Marry You" – Fred Imus and Phil Sweet
Songwriter of the Year:	Larry Gatlin
TV show of the Year:	Hee Haw
Founder's Award:	Ralph Emery

1976 Music City News Awards

Male Artist of the Year:	Conway Twitty
Female Artist of the Year:	Loretta Lynn
Vocal Group of the Year:	The Statler Brothers
Duet of the Year:	Conway Twitty and Loretta Lynn
Band of the Year:	The Coalminers
Instrumentist of the Year:	Buck Owens
Instrumentist Entertainer of the Year:	Roy Clark
Bluegrass Group of the Year:	Osborne Brothers
Comedy Act of the Year:	Mel Tillis
Most Promising Male Artist:	Mickey Gilley
Most Promising Female Artist:	Barbara Mandrell
Album of the Year:	When a Tingle Becomes a Chill – Loretta Lynn
Song of the Year:	"Blue Eyes Crying in the Rain" – Fred Rose
Songwriter of the Year:	Bill Anderson
TV show of the Year:	Hee Haw
Founder's Award:	Faron Young

1975 Music City News Awards

Male Artist of the Year:	Conway Twitty
Female Artist of the Year:	Loretta Lynn
Vocal Group of the Year:	The Statler Brothers
Duet of the Year:	Conway Twitty and Loretta Lynn
Band of the Year:	The Coalminers
Instrumentist of the Year:	Buck Owens
Instrumentist Entertainer of the Year:	Roy Clark
Bluegrass Group of the Year:	Osborne Brothers
Comedy Act of the Year:	Mel Tillis
Most Promising Male Artist:	Ronnie Milsap
Most Promising Female Artist:	Crystal Gayle
Song of the Year:	"Country Bumpkin" – Don Wayne
Songwriter of the Year:	Bill Anderson
TV show of the Year:	Hee Haw

1974 Music City News Awards

Male Artist of the Year:	Conway Twitty
Female Artist of the Year:	Loretta Lynn
Vocal Group of the Year:	The Statler Brothers
Duet of the Year:	Conway Twitty and Loretta Lynn
Band of the Year:	The Buckaroos
Instrumentist of the Year:	Roy Clark
Instrumentist Entertainer of the Year:	Charlie McCoy
Bluegrass Group of the Year:	Osborne Brothers
Comedy Act of the Year:	Mel Tillis
Most Promising Male Artist:	Johnny Rodriguez
Most Promising Female Artist:	Olivia Newton-John
Song of the Year:	"You've Never Been This Far Before" – Conway Twitty
Songwriter of the Year:	Bill Anderson
TV show of the Year:	Hee Haw
Touring Road Show of the Year:	Loretta Lynn, the Coalminers, and Kenny Starr

1973 Music City News Awards

Male Artist of the Year:	Charley Pride
Female Artist of the Year:	Loretta Lynn
Vocal Group of the Year:	The Statler Brothers
Duet of the Year:	Conway Twitty and Loretta Lynn
Band of the Year:	The Po' Boys
Instrumentist of the Year:	Charlie McCoy
Bluegrass Group of the Year:	Osborne Brothers
Comedy Act of the Year:	Mel Tillis
Most Promising Male Artist:	Johnny Rodriguez
Most Promising Female Artist:	Tanya Tucker
Song of the Year:	"Why Me" – Kris Kristofferson
Songwriter of the Year:	Kris Kristofferson
TV show of the Year:	Hee Haw

1972 Music City News Awards

Male Artist of the Year:	Charley Pride
Female Artist of the Year:	Loretta Lynn
Vocal Group of the Year:	The Statler Brothers
Duet of the Year:	Conway Twitty and Loretta Lynn
Band of the Year:	The Strangers
Instrumentist of the Year:	Roy Clark
Bluegrass Group of the Year:	Osborne Brothers
Comedy Act of the Year:	Archie Campbell
Most Promising Male Artist:	Billy "Crash" Craddock
Most Promising Female Artist:	Donna Fargo
Song of the Year:	"Kiss an Angel Good Mornin'" – Ben Peters
Songwriter of the Year:	Kris Kristofferson
TV show of the Year:	Hee Haw

1971 Music City News Awards

Male Artist of the Year:	Charley Pride
Female Artist of the Year:	Loretta Lynn
Vocal Group of the Year:	The Statler Brothers
Duet of the Year:	Conway Twitty and Loretta Lynn
Band of the Year:	The Strangers
Instrumentist of the Year:	Roy Clark
Bluegrass Group of the Year:	Osborne Brothers
Most Promising Male Artist:	Tommy Overstreet
Most Promising Female Artist:	Susan Raye
Song of the Year:	"Help Me Make It Through the Night" – Kris Kristofferson
TV show of the Year:	Hee Haw

1970 Music City News Awards

Male Artist of the Year:	Charley Pride
Female Artist of the Year:	Loretta Lynn
Vocal Group of the Year:	Tompall & the Glaser Brothers
Duet of the Year:	Porter Wagoner and Dolly Parton
Band of the Year:	The Buckaroos
Instrumentist of the Year:	Roy Clark
Most Promising Male Artist:	Tommy Cash
Most Promising Female Artist:	Susan Raye
Song of the Year:	"Hello Darlin'" – Conway Twitty
TV show of the Year:	Hee Haw

=== 1960s ===
1969 Music City News Awards

Male Artist of the Year:	Charley Pride
Female Artist of the Year:	Loretta Lynn
Vocal Group of the Year:	Tompall & the Glaser Brothers
Duet of the Year:	Porter Wagoner and Dolly Parton
Band of the Year:	The Buckaroos
Instrumentist of the Year:	Roy Clark
Most Promising Male Artist:	Johnny Bush
Most Promising Female Artist:	Peggy Sue
Song of the Year:	"All I Have to Offer You (Is Me)" – Dallas Frazier and A.L. "Doodle" Owens
Songwriter of the Year:	Bill Anderson
TV show of the Year:	Hee Haw and The Johnny Cash Show (tie)

1968 Music City News Awards

Male Artist of the Year:	Merle Haggard
Female Artist of the Year:	Loretta Lynn
Vocal Group of the Year:	Tompall & the Glaser Brothers
Duet of the Year:	Porter Wagoner and Dolly Parton
Band of the Year:	The Buckaroos
Most Promising Male Artist:	Cal Smith
Most Promising Female Artist:	Dolly Parton
Songwriter of the Year:	Bill Anderson

1967 Music City News Awards

Male Artist of the Year:	Merle Haggard
Female Artist of the Year:	Loretta Lynn
Vocal Group of the Year:	Tompall & the Glaser Brothers
Duet of the Year:	The Wilburn Brothers
Band of the Year:	The Buckaroos
Most Promising Male Artist:	Tom T. Hall
Most Promising Female Artist:	Tammy Wynette
Song of the Year:	"There Goes My Everything" – Dallas Frazier
Songwriter of the Year:	Bill Anderson
