= The Legend Goes On =

Studio album by The Statler Brothers
- Released: 1982
- Genre: Country
- Length: 25.21
- Label: Mercury
- Producer: Jerry Kennedy

The Statler Brothers chronology
Years Ago (1981)	The Legend Goes On (1982)	Today (1983)

Singles from The Legend Goes On
- 1. "Whatever" Released: July 3, 1982; 2. "A Child of the Fifties" Released: September 1982

Professional ratings
Review scores
Source	Rating
Allmusic	3/5 stars

The Legend Goes On is the twenty-third studio album by American country music group The Statler Brothers. It was released in 1982 via Mercury Records. The album peaked at number 17 on the Billboard Top Country Albums chart.

It was the group's final album to feature original tenor and guitarist Lew DeWitt before he retired due to his failing health and was replaced by Jimmy Fortune.

== Track listing ==
No.	Title	Writer(s)	Length
1.	"Whatever"	Harold Reid, Don Reid	2:12
2.	"I Had Too Much to Dream"	Kim Reid	2:39
3.	"I Don't Know Why"	H. Reid, D. Reid	2:47
4.	"Life's Railway to Heaven"	W.S. Stevenson (Adapted & arranged by H. Reid, D. Reid, Lew DeWitt, Phil Balsley	2:36
5.	"How Do You Like Your Dream So Far"	H. Reid, D. Reid	2:13
6.	"A Child of the Fifties"	D. Reid	2:37
7.	"That's When It Comes Home to You"	DeWitt	2:25
8.	"I Don't Dance No More"	D. Reid	2:06
9.	"What You Are to Me"	D. Reid	3:30
10.	"(I'll Love You) All Over Again"	D. Reid	2:36

== Chart performance ==
Chart (1982)	Peak position
U.S. Billboard Top Country Albums	17
U.S. Billboard 200	201
