= Whatever (The Statler Brothers song) =

Single by The Statler Brothers

from the album The Legend Goes On
- B-side: "Do You Know You Are My Sunshine"
- Released: July 3, 1982
- Genre: Country
- Length: 2:12
- Label: Mercury
- Songwriters: Don Reid, Harold Reid
- Producer: Jerry Kennedy

The Statler Brothers singles chronology
"You'll Be Back (Every Night in My Dreams)" (1982)	"Whatever" (1982)	"A Child of the Fifties" (1982)

"Whatever" is a song recorded by American country music group The Statler Brothers. It was released in July 1982 as the first single from the album The Legend Goes On. The song reached #7 on the Billboard Hot Country Singles & Tracks chart. The song was written by Don Reid and Harold Reid.

== Music video ==
"Whatever" was the group's first music video. However, original tenor Lew DeWitt, who performed on the track, had fallen ill and could not appear in it. His eventual replacement, Jimmy Fortune, substituted for him in the video.

== Chart performance ==
Chart (1982)	Peak position
US Hot Country Songs (Billboard)	7
Canadian RPM Country Tracks	13
