= 19th Music City News Country Awards =

US country music awards ceremony in 1985

- Date: June 11, 1985
- Location: Grand Ole Opry House, Nashville, Tennessee
- Hosted by: Roy Clark; Marie Osmond; John Schneider; The Statlers; Mel Tillis

Highlights
- Most wins: The Statlers (6)
- Most nominations: The Statlers (8)

Television/radio coverage
- Network: Syndication

The 19th Music City News Country Awards was held on June 11, 1985, at the Grand Ole Opry House, in Nashville, Tennessee . The ceremony was hosted by Roy Clark, Marie Osmond, John Schneider, The Statlers, and Mel Tillis.

== Winners and nominees ==
Winners are shown in bold.

Entertainer of the Year	Album of the Year
**The Statlers**; Alabama; Barbara Mandrell; The Oak Ridge Boys; Ricky Skaggs	**Atlanta Blue — The Statlers**; Country Boy — Ricky Skaggs; Long, Long Ago — Marty Robbins; Greatest Hits 2 — Oak Ridge Boys; Roll On — Alabama
Female Artist of the Year	Male Artist of the Year
**Reba McEntire**; Janie Fricke; Loretta Lynn; Barbara Mandrell; Anne Murray	**Lee Greenwood**; Gary Morris; Ricky Skaggs; George Strait; Conway Twitty
Vocal Group of the Year	Vocal Duo of the Year
**The Statlers**; Alabama; Exile; Oak Ridge Boys; The Whites	**The Judds**; Moe Bandy and Joe Stampley; Ray Charles and Willie Nelson; Lee Greenwood and Barbara Mandrell; Dolly Parton and Kenny Rogers
Gospel Act of the Year	Bluegrass Act of the Year
**The Hee Haw Gospel Quartet**; Amy Grant; Christy Lane; Barbara Mandrell; The Oak Ridge Boys	**Ricky Skaggs**; Tompall & the Glaser Brothers; Emmylou Harris Hot Band; Bill Monroe; The Whites
Single of the Year	TV Series of the Year
"**God Bless the U.S.A.**" — **Lee Greenwood**; "I've Been Around Enough to Know" — John Schneider; "Mama He's Crazy" — The Judds; "My Only Love" — The Statlers; "When We Make Love" — Alabama	**Nashville Now**; Austin City Limits; Hee Haw; Music City USA; This Week in Country Music
Star of Tomorrow	Comedy Act of the Year
**The Judds**; Exile; Sawyer Brown; John Schneider; George Strait	**The Statlers**; Moe Bandy and Joe Stampley; Irlene Mandrell; Shotgun Red; Ray Stevens
TV Special of the Year	Video of the Year
**Another Evening with the Statler Brothers – Heroes, Legends and Friends**; Barbara Mandrell: The Lady Is A Champ; Loretta Lynn's Christmas Card; Kenny & Dolly: Once Upon a Christmas; This Year in Country Music	"**Elizabeth**" — **The Statlers**; "All My Rowdy Friends Are Coming Over Tonight" — Hank Williams Jr.; "God Bless the U.S.A." — Lee Greenwood; "My Only Love" — The Statlers; "Where's the Dress" — Moe Bandy and Joe Stampley
Living Legend Award
**Barbara Mandrell**

== See also ==
- CMT Music Awards
