= 20th Music City News Country Awards =

US country music awards ceremony in 1986

- Date: June 14, 1986
- Location: Grand Ole Opry House, Nashville, Tennessee
- Hosted by: Roy Clark; Reba McEntire; The Oak Ridge Boys; Mel Tillis

Highlights
- Most wins: The Statlers (5)
- Most nominations: The Statlers (7)

Television/radio coverage
- Network: Syndication

The 20th Music City News Country Awards was held on June 14, 1986, at the Grand Ole Opry House, in Nashville, Tennessee . The ceremony was hosted by Roy Clark, Reba McEntire, The Oak Ridge Boys, and Mel Tillis.

== Winners and nominees ==
Winners are shown in bold.

| Entertainer of the Year | Album of the Year |
|---|---|
| **The Statlers**; Alabama; The Oak Ridge Boys; Ricky Skaggs; George Strait | **Pardners in Rhyme — The Statlers**; 40-Hour Week — Alabama; Does Fort Worth Ever Cross Your Mind — George Strait; Step On Out — The Oak Ridge Boys; Who's Gonna Fill Their Shoes — George Jones; Why Not Me — The Judds |
| Female Artist of the Year | Male Artist of the Year |
| **Reba McEntire**; Janie Fricke; Loretta Lynn; Barbara Mandrell; Charly McClain; Anne Murray | **George Strait**; Lee Greenwood; Gary Morris; Ricky Skaggs; Conway Twitty; Hank Williams Jr. |
| Vocal Group of the Year | Vocal Duo of the Year |
| **The Statlers**; Alabama; Exile; Oak Ridge Boys; Sawyer Brown | **The Judds**; Lee Greenwood and Barbara Mandrell; Charly McClain and Wayne Massey; Marie Osmond and Dan Seals; Dolly Parton and Kenny Rogers |
| Gospel Act of the Year | Comedy Act of the Year |
| **The Hee Haw Gospel Quartet**; Tennessee Ernie Ford; Vern Gosdin; Amy Grant; Christy Lane | **Ray Stevens**; Jerry Clower; Irlene Mandrell; Minnie Pearl; Shotgun Red; The Statlers |
| Single of the Year | TV Series of the Year |
| "**My Only Love**" — **The Statlers**; "Baby's Got Her Blue Jeans On" — Mel McDaniel; "Somebody Should Leave" — Reba McEntire; "Too Much on My Heart" — The Statlers; "Who's Gonna Fill Their Shoes" — George Jones | **Nashville Now**; Austin City Limits; Grand Ole Opry Live; Hee Haw; This Week in Country Music |
| Star of Tomorrow | Video of the Year |
| **John Schneider**; Exile; Forester Sisters; Lorrie Morgan; Sawyer Brown; Dan Seals | "**My Only Love**" — **The Statlers**; "Country Boy" — Ricky Skaggs; "Highwayman" — The Highwaymen; "Little Things" — The Oak Ridge Boys; "Who's Gonna Fill Their Shoes" — George Jones |
TV Special of the Year
**Farm Aid**; Kenny & Dolly: A Christmas to Remember; Barbara Mandrell: Something Special; The Mandrell Sisters & Family; George Strait: Strait From the Heart of Texas
Living Legend Award
**Loretta Lynn**

== See also ==
- CMT Music Awards
