= A Child of the Fifties =

Single by The Statler Brothers

from the album The Legend Goes On
- B-side: "All Over Again"
- Released: September 1982
- Recorded: March 1981
- Genre: Country
- Length: 2:40
- Label: Mercury
- Songwriter(s): Don Reid
- Producer(s): Jerry Kennedy

The Statler Brothers singles chronology
"Whatever" (1982)	"A Child of the Fifties" (1982)	"Oh Baby Mine (I Get So Lonely)" (1983)

"A Child of the Fifties" is a song written by Don Reid, and recorded by American country music group The Statler Brothers. It was released in September 1982 as the second single from the album The Legend Goes On. The song reached #17 on the Billboard Hot Country Singles & Tracks chart.

== Content ==
Much like many of the Statler Brothers' songs, the song mixes a relationship with nostalgia and contemporary references. The song is a young man's somewhat bittersweet look back at his youth, the then still-relatively recent 1950s in which he grew up, and muses as the carefree days of his youth gave way to early adulthood, in which he lived through the 1960s and 1970s and now, as a father of three living in the (then) early 1980s, he looks back with no regrets. The song also drops hints of a possibly failed marriage in the refrain.

Historic and cultural references mentioned included early television and rock and roll, I Love Lucy, The Adventures of Rin Tin Tin, the Vietnam War, the Apollo 11 Moon landing, Watergate, Democrats making gains in the Senate and House of Representatives during the 1974 midterm elections and the death of Elvis Presley.

== Background ==
"A Child of the Fifties" was the final top 20 hit featuring vocals by Lew DeWitt. Recorded in 1981, a year prior to his retirement due to his health, DeWitt performed solo vocals on the third verse (The seventies were ten years of rerun ... ); as was the case with several other Statler Brothers' songs, each member takes a solo turn singing a verse or portion of the song.

== Chart performance ==
Chart (1982–1983)	Peak position
US Hot Country Songs (Billboard)	17
