= 18th Music City News Country Awards =

US country music awards ceremony in 1984

- Date: June 6, 1984
- Location: Grand Ole Opry House, Nashville, Tennessee
- Hosted by: Larry Gatlin; The Statlers; Sylvia

Highlights
- Most wins: The Statlers (4)
- Most nominations: The Statlers (5)

Television/radio coverage
- Network: Syndication

The 18th Music City News Country Awards was held on June 6, 1984, at the Grand Ole Opry House, in Nashville, Tennessee. The ceremony was hosted by Larry Gatlin, The Statlers, and Sylvia.

== Winners and nominees ==
Winners are shown in bold.

Female Artist of the Year	Male Artist of the Year
**Janie Fricke**; Loretta Lynn; Barbara Mandrell; Charly McClain; Reba McEntire	**Lee Greenwood**; George Jones; Ricky Skaggs; Conway Twitty; Don Williams
Vocal Group of the Year	Vocal Duo of the Year
**The Statlers**; Alabama; The Gatlin Brothers; Oak Ridge Boys; The Whites	**Kenny Rogers** **and** **Dolly Parton**; David Frizzell and Shelly West; Mickey Gilley and Charly McClain; Merle Haggard and Willie Nelson; Conway Twitty and Loretta Lynn
Vocal Band of the Year	Bluegrass Act of the Year
**Alabama**; The Do-Rights; Oak Ridge Boys; Marty Robbins Band; Ricky Skaggs Band	**Ricky Skaggs**; Tompall & the Glaser Brothers; Emmylou Harris Hot Band; Bill Monroe; The Whites
Single of the Year	Album of the Year
"**Elizabeth**" — **The Statlers**; "I.O.U." — Lee Greenwood; "Islands in the Stream" — Dolly Parton and Kenny Rogers; "Lady Down on Love" — Alabama; "You Look So Good in Love" — George Strait	**The Closer You Get... — Alabama**; Don't Cheat in Our Hometown — Ricky Skaggs; Some Memories Just Won't Die — Marty Robbins; Spun Gold — Barbara Mandrell; Today — The Statlers
Star of Tomorrow	Comedy Act of the Year
**Ronny Robbins**; Lee Greenwood; Gary Morris; George Strait; Steve Wariner	**The Statlers**; Jerry Clower; Minnie Pearl; Jerry Reed; Ray Stevens
Gospel Act of the Year	TV Series of the Year
**The Hee Haw Gospel Quartet**; The Blackwood Brothers; Tennessee Ernie Ford; Amy Grant; Christy Lane	**Hee Haw**; Austin City Limits; Music City USA; Nashville Now; This Week in Country Music
TV Special of the Year	Living Legend Award
**Another Evening with the Statler Brothers – Heroes, Legends and Friends**; Blowout at Billy Bob's; Country Music Association's 25th Anniversary Show; Janie Fricke: You Ought To Be In Pictures; Barbara Mandrell: The Lady Is A Champ	**Ernest Tubb**; Eddy Arnold; George Jones; Minnie Pearl; Conway Twitty

== See also ==
- CMT Music Awards
