= Years Ago =

Years Ago may refer to:

- Years Ago (album), a 1981 album by The Statler Brothers
- "Years Ago" (song), the title track from the album
- "Years Ago", a track from the 1975 Alice Cooper album Welcome To My Nightmare
- Years Ago, a 1946 play by Ruth Gordon later adapted into The Actress
- ya, an abbreviation for "years ago" used in science
