= Today (The Statler Brothers album) =

Studio album by The Statler Brothers
- Released: 1983
- Genre: Country
- Length: 27:27
- Label: Mercury
- Producer: Jerry Kennedy

The Statler Brothers chronology
| The Legend Goes On (1982) | Today (1983) | Atlanta Blue (1984) |

Singles from Today
- 1. "Guilty" Released: July 1983; 2. "Elizabeth" Released: November 1983

Professional ratings
Review scores
| Source | Rating |
|---|---|
| AllMusic | 4.5/5 stars |

Today is the twenty-fourth studio album by American country music group the Statler Brothers. It was released in 1983 via Mercury Records. The album peaked at number 193 on the Billboard 200 chart. It is the first Statler album to feature Jimmy Fortune, who replaced Lew DeWitt as the group's new tenor singer due to the latter's failing health.

== Track listing ==
| No. | Title | Writer(s) | Length |
|---|---|---|---|
| 1. | "Oh Baby Mine (I Get So Lonely)" | Pat Ballard | 2:29 |
| 2. | "Some Memories Last Forever" | Don Reid | 3:24 |
| 3. | "Promise" | Jimmy Fortune | 2:12 |
| 4. | "I'm Dyin' a Little Each Day" | Harold Reid | 2:51 |
| 5. | "There Is You" | D. Reid, H. Reid | 2:17 |
| 6. | "Guilty" | D. Reid, H. Reid | 3:01 |
| 7. | "Elizabeth" | Fortune | 3:26 |
| 8. | "Right on the Money" | John Rimel | 3:00 |
| 9. | "I Never Want to Kiss You Goodbye" | Kim Reid | 2:23 |
| 10. | "Sweet By and By" | Traditional | 2:45 |

== Charts ==
=== Weekly charts ===
| Chart (1983) | Peak position |
|---|---|
| Canadian Country Albums (RPM) | 16 |
| US Billboard 200 | 193 |
| US Top Country Albums (Billboard) | 10 |

=== Year-end charts ===
| Chart (1983) | Position |
|---|---|
| US Top Country Albums (Billboard) | 47 |

== Certifications ==
| Region | Certification | Certified units/sales |
|---|---|---|
| United States (RIAA) | Gold | 500,000^{^} |
^{^} Shipments figures based on certification alone.
