= Years Ago (album) =

Studio album by The Statler Brothers
- Released: 1981
- Genre: Country
- Length: 28:10
- Label: Mercury
- Producer: Jerry Kennedy

The Statler Brothers chronology
10th Anniversary (1980)	Years Ago (1981)	The Legend Goes On (1982)

Singles from Years Ago
- 1. "Don't Wait on Me" Released: June 13, 1981; 2. "Years Ago" Released: October 24, 1981; 3. "You'll Be Back (Every Night in My Dreams)" Released: March 13, 1982

Professional ratings
Review scores
Source	Rating
AllMusic	2.5/5 stars

Years Ago is the twenty-second studio album by American country music group the Statler Brothers. It was released in 1981 via Mercury Records. The album peaked at number 9 on the Billboard Top Country Albums chart.

== Track listing ==
No.	Title	Writer(s)	Length
1.	"Don't Wait on Me"	Don Reid, Harold Reid	3:16
2.	"Today I Went Back"	D. Reid	2:08
3.	"In the Garden"	C. Austin Miles	2:58
4.	"Chet Atkins' Hand"	Lew DeWitt	3:31
5.	"You'll Be Back (Every Night in My Dreams)"	Wayland Holyfield, Johnny Russell	2:39
6.	"Years Ago"	D. Reid	2:22
7.	"Love Was All We Had"	D. Reid	3:48
8.	"We Ain't Even Started Yet"	D. Reid, H. Reid	2:27
9.	"Dad"	D. Reid, H. Reid	2:47
10.	"Memories Are Made of This"	Richard Dehr, Terry Gilkyson, Frank Miller	2:14

== Chart performance ==
Chart (1981)	Peak position
U.S. Billboard Top Country Albums	9
U.S. Billboard 200	103
