= You'll Be Back (Every Night in My Dreams) =

Single by The Statler Brothers

from the album Years Ago
- B-side: "We Ain't Even Started Yet"
- Released: March 13, 1982
- Genre: Country
- Length: 2:39
- Label: Mercury Nashville
- Songwriter(s): Wayland Holyfield, Johnny Russell
- Producer(s): Jerry Kennedy

The Statler Brothers singles chronology
"Years Ago" (1981)	"You'll Be Back (Every Night in My Dreams)" (1982)	"Whatever" (1982)

"You'll Be Back (Every Night in My Dreams)" is a song written by Wayland Holyfield and American country music singer Johnny Russell, and originally recorded by Russell. He released it for Polydor Records in 1978, charting at number 24 on Hot Country Songs.

Conway Twitty covered the song on his 1980 album, Rest Your Love on Me.

The song is most recognized by the cover released by American country music group The Statler Brothers in March 1982 as the third single from their album Years Ago. Their version of the song peaked at number 3 on the Billboard Hot Country Singles chart.

== Chart performance ==
=== Johnny Russell ===
Chart (1978)	Peak position
US Hot Country Songs (Billboard)	24

=== The Statler Brothers ===
Chart (1982)	Peak position
US Hot Country Songs (Billboard)	3

==== Year-end charts ====
Chart (1982)	Position
US Hot Country Songs (Billboard)	46
