= Don't Wait on Me =

1981 single by The Statler Brothers

Single by The Statler Brothers

from the album Years Ago
- B-side: "Chet Atkins' Hand"
- Released: June 13, 1981
- Genre: Country
- Length: 3:16
- Label: Mercury Nashville
- Songwriters: Don Reid, Harold Reid
- Producer: Jerry Kennedy

The Statler Brothers singles chronology
| "In the Garden" (1981) | "Don't Wait on Me" (1981) | "Years Ago" (1981) |

"Don't Wait on Me" is a song written by Don Reid and Harold Reid, and recorded by American country music group The Statler Brothers. It was released in June 1981 as the first single from their album Years Ago. The song peaked at No. 5 on the Billboard Hot Country Singles chart.

Group members Don Reid and Lew DeWitt trade call-and-response lead vocals on the verses.

== Content ==
The song is an affirmation of a breakup, with one half of the ex-couple using "when pigs fly"-type hyperboles – including the sun rising in the west and setting in the east, San Diego sailors not getting tattooed, the wind not blowing in Chicago (opposing the city's nickname "The Windy City"), L.A. being cold and clear (opposing the city's warm climate and smog), winter weather for the Fourth of July, and so forth – to impress upon the other half that they should not expect to reunite as a couple.

Several cultural references are made, including famous atheist Madalyn Murray O'Hair, and Wrigley Field (when the lights go on), which, at the time of the recording, was the only unlighted field in Major League Baseball. On the Statlers' live 1989 album Live-Sold Out, on which they performed the song, the lyric referring to Wrigley Field was revised as putting a dome on the ballpark (as lights for night games had been installed in the ballpark in 1988, since the song's studio recording).

== Chart performance ==
| Chart (1981) | Peak position |
|---|---|
| US Hot Country Songs (Billboard) | 5 |
| Canadian RPM Country Tracks | 36 |

=== Re-recording (LIVE) ===
| Chart (1989) | Peak position |
|---|---|
| US Hot Country Songs (Billboard) | 67 |
