= List of awards and nominations received by Keith Urban =

Keith Urban awards and nominations
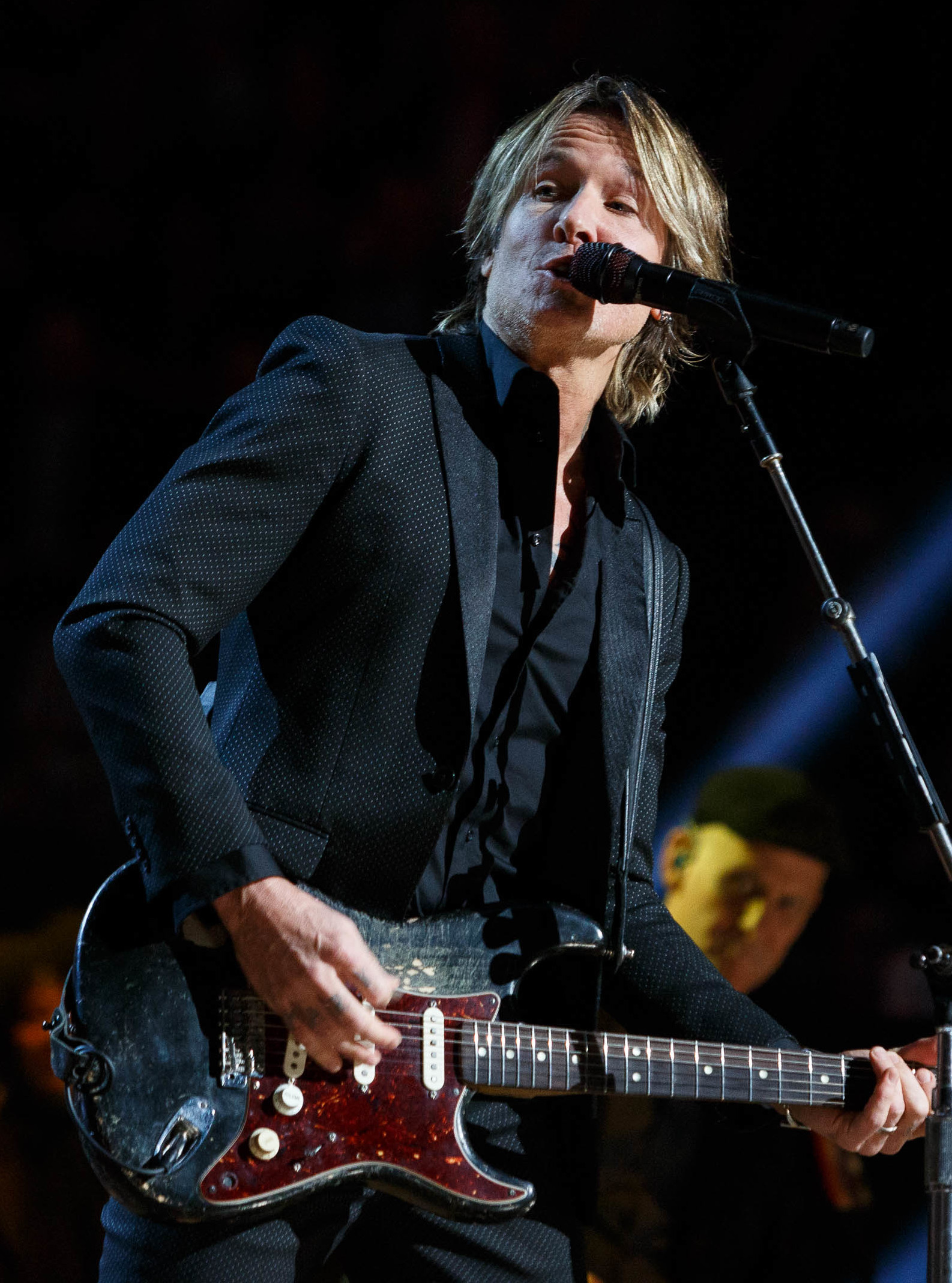
- Keith Urban at DAR Constitution Hall in 2020
Awards and nominations
Award	Wins	Nominations
ACM Awards	15	41
ARIA Music Awards	8	22
American Music Awards	4	4
CMA Awards	14	50
CMT Music Awards	9	30
Critics' Choice Awards	0	1
Golden Globe Awards	0	1
Grammy Awards	4	19

Totals (Note: Certain award groups do not simply award one winner. They acknowledge several different recipients, have runners-up, and have third place. Since this is a specific recognition and is different from losing an award, runner-up mentions are considered wins in this award tally. For simplification and to avoid errors, each award in this list has been presumed to have had a prior nomination.)
- Wins: 110
- Nominations: 256

This is a list of awards and nominations received by Australian-American singer, songwriter and producer Keith Urban.

Active in the music scene since the 1990s, when he won Australia's biggest country music competition Star Maker. Urban is regarded as one of the leading country musicians of the 21st century, and has been the recipient of numerous awards. The Academy of Country Music Awards presented Urban with both the Jim Reeves International Award and the Mae Boren Axton Award, in recognition of "outstanding contributions to the acceptance of country music throughout the world.done the most to promote the genre worldwide". The Country Music Association Awards honored Urban with the Horizon Award, while BMI Awards gave him the Champion Award.

During his career, he has also been nominated nineteen times for Grammy Awards, winning four in the Best Male Country Vocal Performance category. Urban is also the singer, composer and producer of the original song "For You" from film Act of Valor, which earned him nominations at both the 70th Golden Globe Awards and at the 18th Critics' Choice Awards in the respective Best Original Song categories.

Urban is the recipient of four American Music Awards and six ARIA Music Awards, including the Outstanding Achievement Award for his contribution to Australian country music.

== Awards and nominations ==
Awards	Year	Category	Recipient(s)	Result	Ref.
Academy of Country Music Awards	2001	Top New Male Vocalist	Himself	Won	
Academy of Country Music Awards	2003	Single Record of the Year	"Somebody Like You"	Nominated	
Academy of Country Music Awards	2004	Top Male Vocalist of the Year	Himself	Nominated	
Academy of Country Music Awards	2005	Entertainer of the Year	Himself	Nominated	
Academy of Country Music Awards	2005	Top Male Vocalist of the Year	Himself	Won	
Academy of Country Music Awards	2005	Album of the Year	Be Here	Won	
Academy of Country Music Awards	2005	Single Record of the Year	"Days Go By"	Won	
Academy of Country Music Awards	2006	Entertainer of the Year	Himself	Nominated	
Academy of Country Music Awards	2006	Top Male Vocalist of the Year	Himself	Won	
Academy of Country Music Awards	2007	Top Male Vocalist of the Year	Himself	Nominated	
Academy of Country Music Awards	2008	Top Male Vocalist of the Year	Himself	Nominated	
Academy of Country Music Awards	2008	Entertainer of the Year	Himself	Nominated	
Academy of Country Music Awards	2009	Entertainer of the Year	Himself	Nominated	
Academy of Country Music Awards	2009	Top Male Vocalist of the Year	Himself	Nominated	
Academy of Country Music Awards	2009	Vocal Event of the Year	"Start A Band" (with Brad Paisley)	Won	
Academy of Country Music Awards	2010	Jim Reeves International Award	Himself	Won	
Academy of Country Music Awards	2010	Entertainer of the Year	Himself	Nominated	
Academy of Country Music Awards	2010	Top Male Vocalist of the Year	Himself	Nominated	
Academy of Country Music Awards	2011	Entertainer of the Year	Himself	Nominated	
Academy of Country Music Awards	2011	Top Male Vocalist of the Year	Himself	Nominated	
Academy of Country Music Awards	2011	Vocal Event of the Year	"Blue Sky" (with Emily West)	Nominated	
Academy of Country Music Awards	2014	Male Artist of the Year	Himself	Nominated	
Academy of Country Music Awards	2014	Single of the Year	"Highway Don't Care" (with Tim McGraw & Taylor Swift)	Nominated	
Academy of Country Music Awards	2014	Video of the Year	"Highway Don't Care" (with Tim McGraw & Taylor Swift)	Won	
Academy of Country Music Awards	2014	Vocal Event of the Year	"Highway Don't Care" (with Tim McGraw & Taylor Swift)	Nominated	
Academy of Country Music Awards	2014	Vocal Event of the Year	"We Were Us" (with Miranda Lambert)	Won	
Academy of Country Music Awards	2015	Video of the Year	"Cop Car"	Nominated	
Academy of Country Music Awards	2016	Mae Boren Axton Award	Himself	Won	
Academy of Country Music Awards	2016	Vocal Event of the Year	"Raise 'Em Up" (with Eric Church)	Nominated	
Academy of Country Music Awards	2017	Entertainer of the Year	Himself	Nominated	
Academy of Country Music Awards	2017	Male Artist of the Year	Himself	Nominated	
Academy of Country Music Awards	2017	Album of the Year	Ripcord	Nominated	
Academy of Country Music Awards	2017	Single of the Year	"Blue Ain't Your Color"	Nominated	
Academy of Country Music Awards	2018	Entertainer of the Year	Himself	Nominated	
Academy of Country Music Awards	2018	Male Artist of the Year	Himself	Nominated	
Academy of Country Music Awards	2018	Vocal Event of the Year	"The Fighter" (with Carrie Underwood)	Won	
Academy of Country Music Awards	2019	Entertainer of the Year	Himself	Won	
Academy of Country Music Awards	2019	Male Artist of the Year	Himself	Nominated	
Academy of Country Music Awards	2020	Male Artist of the Year	Himself	Nominated	
Academy of Country Music Awards	2021	Music Event of the Year	"Be a Light" (with Thomas Rhett, Reba McEntire, Hillary Scott & Chris Tomlin)	Nominated	
Academy of Country Music Awards	2021	Music Event of the Year	"One Too Many" (with Pink)	Nominated	
Academy of Country Music Awards	2025	Triple Crown Award	Himself	Won	
American Country Awards	2010	Male Artist of the Year	Himself	Nominated	
American Country Awards	2011	Album of the Year	Get Closer	Nominated	
American Country Awards	2011	Music Video by a Male Artist of the Year	"Put You in a Song"	Nominated	
American Country Awards	2011	Touring Artist of the Year	Himself	Nominated	
American Country Awards	2012	Video of the Year	"For You"	Nominated	
American Country Awards	2012	Music Video by a Male Artist of the Year	"For You"	Nominated	
American Country Awards	2013	Song of the Year	"Highway Don't Care" (with Tim McGraw & Taylor Swift)	Won	
American Country Awards	2013	Music Video by a Collaboration of the Year	"Highway Don't Care" (with Tim McGraw & Taylor Swift)	Won	
American Country Awards	2013	Single by a Vocal Collaboration of the Year	"Highway Don't Care" (with Tim McGraw & Taylor Swift)	Won	
American Country Countdown Awards	2014	Collaboration of the Year	"We Were Us" (with Miranda Lambert)	Nominated	
American Music Awards	2009	Favorite Male Country Artist	Himself	Won	
American Music Awards	2017	Favorite Male Country Artist	Himself	Won	
American Music Awards	2017	Favorite Country Album	Ripcord	Won	
American Music Awards	2017	Favorite Country Song	"Blue Ain't Your Color"	Won	
ARIA Music Awards	1992	Best Country Album	"Only You"	Nominated	
ARIA Music Awards	1993	Best Country Album	"Lights on the Hill" (with Slim Dusty)	Nominated	
ARIA Music Awards	2000	Best Country Album	Keith Urban	Nominated	
ARIA Music Awards	2001	Outstanding Achievement Award	Himself	Won	
ARIA Music Awards	2003	Best Country Album	Golden Road	Won	
ARIA Music Awards	2005	Album of the Year	Be Here	Nominated	
ARIA Music Awards	2005	Best Country Album	Be Here	Won	
ARIA Music Awards	2005	Best Male Artist	Himself	Nominated	
ARIA Music Awards	2007	Best Country Album	Love, Pain & the Whole Crazy Thing	Won	
ARIA Music Awards	2009	Best Country Album	Defying Gravity	Nominated	
ARIA Music Awards	2011	Highest Selling Album	Get Closer	Nominated	
ARIA Music Awards	2011	Best Country Album	Get Closer	Nominated	
ARIA Music Awards	2011	Most Popular Australian Live Artist	Himself	Nominated	
ARIA Music Awards	2011	Most Popular Australian Artist	Himself	Nominated	
ARIA Music Awards	2012	Best Male Artist	Himself	Nominated	
ARIA Music Awards	2013	Best Male Artist	Himself	Nominated	
ARIA Music Awards	2013	Best Australian Live Act	Himself	Nominated	
ARIA Music Awards	2014	Best Country Album	Fuse	Nominated	
ARIA Music Awards	2014	Best Australian Live Act	Himself	Won	
ARIA Music Awards	2016	Song of the Year	"The Fighter" (with Carrie Underwood)	Nominated	
ARIA Music Awards	2019	Best Australian Live Act	Himself	Nominated	
ARIA Music Awards	2021	Song of the Year	"Love Songs Ain't for Us" (with Amy Shark)	Nominated	
ARIA Music Awards	2021	Song of the Year	"One Too Many" (with Pink)	Nominated	
ARIA Music Awards	2021	Best Artist	Himself	Nominated	
ARIA Music Awards	2025	High	Best Country Album	Nominated	
ARIA Music Awards	2026	Flow State	Best Country Album	Nominated	
Billboard Music Awards	2004	Top Country Song	"You'll Think of Me"	Nominated	
Billboard Music Awards	2005	Country Songs Artist of the Year	Himself	Nominated	
Billboard Music Awards	2006	Country Songs Artist of the Year	Himself	Nominated	
Billboard Music Awards	2017	Country Songs Artist of the Year	Himself	Nominated	
Billboard Music Awards	2017	Top Country Album	Ripcord	Nominated	
Billboard Music Awards	2017	Top Country Song	"Blue Ain't Your Color"	Nominated	
BMI Country Awards	2001	Top Country Songs	"But of the Grace of Love"	Won	
BMI Country Awards	2003	Top Country Songs	"Somebody Like You"	Won	
BMI Country Awards	2004	Top Country Songs	"Who Wouldn't Wanna Be Me"	Won	
BMI Country Awards	2005	Top Country Songs	"Days Go By"	Won	
BMI Country Awards	2005	Top Country Songs	"You're My Better Half"	Won	
BMI Country Awards	2006	Top Country Songs	"Better Life"	Won	
BMI Country Awards	2006	Top Country Songs	"Tonight I Wanna Cry"	Won	
BMI Country Awards	2008	Top Country Songs	"Everybody"	Won	
BMI Country Awards	2008	Top Country Songs	"I Told You So"	Won	
BMI Country Awards	2009	Top Country Songs	"Start a Band"	Won	
BMI Country Awards	2009	Top Country Songs	"Sweet Thing"	Won	
BMI Country Awards	2009	Top Country Songs	"You Look Good in my Shirt"	Won	
BMI Country Awards	2010	Top Country Songs	"Only You Can Love Me This Way"	Won	
BMI Country Awards	2010	Top Country Songs	"Kiss a Girl"	Won	
BMI Country Awards	2011	Top Country Songs	"Put You in a Song"	Won	
BMI Country Awards	2011	Top Country Songs	"Til Summer Comes Around"	Won	
BMI Country Awards	2012	Top Country Songs	"Without You"	Won	
BMI Country Awards	2012	Top Country Songs	"You Gonna Fly"	Won	
BMI Country Awards	2012	Top Country Songs	"Long Hot Summer"	Won	
BMI Country Awards	2013	Top Country Songs	"For You"	Won	
BMI Country Awards	2015	Top Country Songs	"Somewhere in My Car"	Won	
BMI Country Awards	2017	Champion Award	Himself	Won	
BMI Country Awards	2017	Top Country Songs	"Wasted Time"	Won	
BMI Country Awards	2018	Top Country Songs	"The Fighter"	Won	
BMI Country Awards	2020	Top Country Songs	"Coming Home"	Won	
British Country Music Awards	2013	International Song of the Year	"Highway Don't Care" (with Tim McGraw & Taylor Swift)	Won	
Country Music Association Awards	2001	Horizon Award	Himself	Won	
Country Music Association Awards	2004	Male Vocalist of the Year	Himself	Won	
Country Music Association Awards	2005	Entertainer of the Year	Himself	Won	
Country Music Association Awards	2005	Male Vocalist of the Year	Himself	Won	
Country Music Association Awards	2005	Album of the Year	Be Here	Nominated	
Country Music Association Awards	2005	Music Video of the Year	"Days Go By"	Nominated	
Country Music Association Awards	2006	Entertainer of the Year	Himself	Nominated	
Country Music Association Awards	2006	Male Vocalist of the Year	Himself	Won	
Country Music Association Awards	2006	Single of the Year	"Better Life"	Nominated	
Country Music Association Awards	2006	Song of the Year	"Tonight I Wanna Cry" (with Monty Powell)	Nominated	
Country Music Association Awards	2007	Entertainer of the Year	Himself	Nominated	
Country Music Association Awards	2007	Male Vocalist of the Year	Himself	Nominated	
Country Music Association Awards	2007	Album of the Year	Love, Pain & the Whole Crazy Thing	Won	
Country Music Association Awards	2008	Entertainer of the Year	Himself	Nominated	
Country Music Association Awards	2008	Male Vocalist of the Year	Himself	Nominated	
Country Music Association Awards	2009	Entertainer of the Year	Himself	Nominated	
Country Music Association Awards	2009	Male Vocalist of the Year	Himself	Nominated	
Country Music Association Awards	2009	Album of the Year	Defying Gravity	Nominated	
Country Music Association Awards	2009	Music Video of the Year	"Start a Band" (with Brad Paisley)	Nominated	
Country Music Association Awards	2009	Musical Event of the Year	"Start a Band" (with Brad Paisley)	Won	
Country Music Association Awards	2010	Entertainer of the Year	Himself	Nominated	
Country Music Association Awards	2010	Male Vocalist of the Year	Himself	Nominated	
Country Music Association Awards	2011	Entertainer of the Year	Himself	Nominated	
Country Music Association Awards	2011	Male Vocalist of the Year	Himself	Nominated	
Country Music Association Awards	2012	Male Vocalist of the Year	Himself	Nominated	
Country Music Association Awards	2013	Male Vocalist of the Year	Himself	Nominated	
Country Music Association Awards	2013	Male Vocalist of the Year	"Highway Don't Care" (with Tim McGraw & Taylor Swift)	Nominated	
Country Music Association Awards	2013	Music Video of the Year	"Highway Don't Care" (with Tim McGraw & Taylor Swift)	Won	
Country Music Association Awards	2013	Musical Event of the Year	"Highway Don't Care" (with Tim McGraw & Taylor Swift)	Won	
Country Music Association Awards	2014	Entertainer of the Year	Himself	Nominated	
Country Music Association Awards	2014	Male Vocalist of the Year	Himself	Nominated	
Country Music Association Awards	2014	Album of the Year	Fuse	Nominated	
Country Music Association Awards	2014	Musical Event of the Year	"We Were Us" (with Miranda Lambert)	Won	
Country Music Association Awards	2015	Musical Event of the Year	"Raise 'Em Up" (with Eric Church)	Won	
Country Music Association Awards	2016	Entertainer of the Year	Himself	Nominated	
Country Music Association Awards	2016	Male Vocalist of the Year	Himself	Nominated	
Country Music Association Awards	2016	Album of the Year	Fuse	Nominated	
Country Music Association Awards	2016	Musical Event of the Year	"The Fighter" (with Carrie Underwood)	Nominated	
Country Music Association Awards	2017	Entertainer of the Year	Himself	Nominated	
Country Music Association Awards	2017	Male Vocalist of the Year	Himself	Nominated	
Country Music Association Awards	2017	Single of the Year	"Blue Ain't Your Color"	Won	
Country Music Association Awards	2017	Music Video of the Year	"Blue Ain't Your Color"	Nominated	
Country Music Association Awards	2018	Entertainer of the Year	Himself	Won	
Country Music Association Awards	2018	Male Vocalist of the Year	Himself	Nominated	
Country Music Association Awards	2018	Album of the Year	Graffiti U	Nominated	
Country Music Association Awards	2019	Entertainer of the Year	Himself	Nominated	
Country Music Association Awards	2019	Male Vocalist of the Year	Himself	Nominated	
Country Music Association Awards	2020	Entertainer of the Year	Himself	Nominated	
Country Music Association Awards	2020	Male Vocalist of the Year	Himself	Nominated	
Country Music Association Awards	2020	Musical Event of the Year	"Be a Light" (with Thomas Rhett, Reba McEntire, Hillary Scott & Chris Tomlin)	Nominated	
Country Music Awards of Australia	1991	New Talent of the Year	Himself	Won	
Country Music Awards of Australia	1992	Male Vocalist of the Year	Himself	Won	
Country Music Awards of Australia	1992	Instrumental of the Year	"The Western Main"	Won	
Country Music Awards of Australia	1998	Instrumental of the Year	"Clutterbilly"	Won	
Country Music Awards of Australia	2001	Instrumental of the Year	"Rollercoaster"	Won	
Country Music Awards of Australia	2003	Video Clip of the Year	"Somebody Like You"	Won	
Country Music Awards of Australia	2004	Top Selling Album of the Year	Golden Road	Won	
Country Music Awards of Australia	2007	Special Golden Guitar Award	Golden Road	Won	
Country Music Awards of Australia	2010	Top Selling Album of the Year	Defying Gravity	Won	
Country Music Awards of Australia	2012	Male Artist of the Year	Himself	Won	
Country Music Awards of Australia	2012	Top Selling Album of the Year	Get Closer	Won	
Country Music Awards of Australia	2017	Top Selling Album of the Year	Ripcord	Won	
Country Music Awards of Australia	2019	Top Selling Album of the Year	Graffiti U	Won	
Country Music Awards of Australia	2021	Top Selling Album of the Year	The Speed of Now Part 1	Won	
Country Music Awards of Australia	2025	Top Selling Album of the Year	High	Won	
Country Music Awards of Australia	2025	himself	Australian Roll of Renown	inducted	
CMC Music Awards	2011	Video of the Year	"'Til Summer Comes Around"	Won	
CMC Music Awards	2012	Video of the Year	"Til Summer Comes Around"	Won	
CMC Music Awards	2012	International Artist of the Year	Himself	Won	
CMC Music Awards	2013	International Video of the Year	"For You"	Won	
CMC Music Awards	2013	International Artist of the Year	Himself	Won	
CMC Music Awards	2014	International Video of the Year	"Highway Don't Care" (with Tim Mcgraw & Taylor Swift)	Won	
CMC Music Awards	2015	International Video of the Year	"Cop Car"	Won	
CMC Music Awards	2015	International Artist of the Year	Himself	Won	
CMC Music Awards	2016	International Video of the Year	"Raise 'Em Up" (with Eric Church)	Won	
CMC Music Awards	2016	International Artist of the Year	Himself	Won	
CMC Music Awards	2017	International Album of the Year	Ripcord	Won	
CMC Music Awards	2017	International Video of the Year	"Wasted Time"	Won	
CMC Music Awards	2017	International Artist of the Year	Himself	Won	
CMC Music Awards	2018	International Video of the Year	"The Fighter" (with Carrie Underwood)	Won	
CMC Music Awards	2018	International Artist of the Year	Himself	Won	
CMT Music Awards	2005	Video of the Year	"Days Go By"	Won	
CMT Music Awards	2006	Video of the Year	"Better Life"	Won	
CMT Music Awards	2006	Male Video of the Year	"Better Life"	Nominated	
CMT Music Awards	2006	Hottest Video of the Year	"Making Memories Of Us"	Nominated	
CMT Music Awards	2007	Video of the Year	"Once In a Lifetime"	Nominated	
CMT Music Awards	2008	Male Video of the Year	"I Told You So"	Nominated	
CMT Music Awards	2009	Male Video of the Year	"Sweet Thing"	Nominated	
CMT Music Awards	2009	Collaborative Video of the Year	"Start A Band" (with Brad Paisley)	Won	
CMT Music Awards	2010	Male Video of the Year	"Til Summer Comes Around"	Won	
CMT Music Awards	2011	Male Video of the Year	"Without You"	Nominated	
CMT Music Awards	2011	CMT Performance of the Year	"Sweet Thing" (with John Mayer)	Nominated	
CMT Music Awards	2012	Male Video of the Year	"Long Hot Summer"	Nominated	
CMT Music Awards	2014	Video of the Year	"We Were Us" (with Miranda Lambert)	Nominated	
CMT Music Awards	2014	Collaborative Video of the Year	"We Were Us" (with Miranda Lambert)	Nominated	
CMT Music Awards	2014	Video of the Year	"Highway Don't Care" (with Tim McGraw & Taylor Swift)	Nominated	
CMT Music Awards	2014	Collaborative Video of the Year	"Highway Don't Care" (with Tim McGraw & Taylor Swift)	Nominated	
CMT Music Awards	2015	Male Video of the Year	"Somewhere In My Car"	Nominated	
CMT Music Awards	2015	CMT Performance of the Year	"It's a Man's, Man's, Man's World"	Nominated	
CMT Music Awards	2016	Male Video of the Year	"John Cougar, John Deere, John 3:16"	Nominated	
CMT Music Awards	2017	Video of the Year	"Blue Ain't Your Color"	Won	
CMT Music Awards	2017	Male Video of the Year	"Blue Ain't Your Color"	Won	
CMT Music Awards	2017	Collaborative Video of the Year	"The Fighter" (with Carrie Underwood)	Won	
CMT Music Awards	2017	Social Superstar of the Year	Himself	Won	
CMT Music Awards	2018	CMT Performance of the Year	"I Won't Back Down" (with Jason Aldean, Chris Stapleton & Little Big Town)	Nominated	
CMT Music Awards	2018	CMT Performance of the Year	"The Fighter" (with Carrie Underwood)	Nominated	
CMT Music Awards	2019	Video of the Year	"Coming Home" (with Julia Michaels)	Nominated	
CMT Music Awards	2019	Collaborative Video of the Year	"Coming Home" (with Julia Michaels)	Won	
CMT Music Awards	2020	Video of the Year	"Polaroid"	Nominated	
CMT Music Awards	2021	Video of the Year	"Coming Home" (with Pink)	Nominated	
CMT Music Awards	2021	Collaborative Video of the Year	"Coming Home" (with Pink)	Nominated	
Critics' Choice Awards	2013	Best Song	"For You"	Nominated	
Golden Globe Awards	2013	Best Original Song	"For You"	Nominated	
Grammy Awards	2001	Best Country Instrumental Performance	"Rollercoaster"	Nominated	
Grammy Awards	2005	Best Male Country Vocal Performance	"You'll Think Of Me"	Nominated	
Grammy Awards	2005	Best Country Album	Be Here	Nominated	
Grammy Awards	2006	Best Male Country Vocal Performance	"You'll Think Of Me"	Won	
Grammy Awards	2007	Best Male Country Vocal Performance	"Once In A Lifetime"	Nominated	
Grammy Awards	2008	Best Male Country Vocal Performance	"Stupid Boy"	Won	
Grammy Awards	2009	Best Country Collaboration With Vocals	"Let The Wind Chase You" (with Trisha Yearwood)	Nominated	
Grammy Awards	2010	Best Male Country Vocal Performance	"Sweet Thing"	Won	
Grammy Awards	2010	Best Country Collaboration With Vocals	"Start A Band"	Nominated	
Grammy Awards	2010	Best Long Form Music Video	Love, Pain & The Whole Crazy World Tour Live	Nominated	
Grammy Awards	2010	Best Country Album	Defying Gravity	Nominated	
Grammy Awards	2011	Best Male Country Vocal Performance	"Til Summer Comes Around"	Won	
Grammy Awards	2014	Best Country Duo/Group Performance	"Highway Don't Care" (with Tim McGraw & Taylor Swift)	Nominated	
Grammy Awards	2015	Best Country Solo Performance	"Cop Car"	Nominated	
Grammy Awards	2015	Best Country Duo/Group Performance	"Raise 'Em Up"	Nominated	
Grammy Awards	2016	Best Country Solo Performance	"John Cougar, John Deere, John 3:16"	Nominated	
Grammy Awards	2017	Best Country Solo Performance	"Blue Ain't Your Color"	Nominated	
Grammy Awards	2017	Best Country Album	Ripcord	Nominated	
Grammy Awards	2019	Best Country Solo Performance	"Parallel Line"	Nominated	
Helpmann Awards	2012	Best Australian Contemporary Concert	Get Closer Tour	Nominated	
Helpmann Awards	2013	Best Australian Contemporary Concert	The Story So Far	Nominated	
iHeartRadio Music Awards	2014	Country Song of the Year	"Highway Don't Care" (with Tim McGraw & Taylor Swift)	Nominated	
iHeartRadio Music Awards	2017	Country Artist of the Year	Himself	Nominated	
iHeartRadio Music Awards	2020	Best Cover Song	"Lover" (by Taylor Swift)	Nominated	
Mo Awards	2000	Australian Showbusiness Ambassador	Himself	Won	
People's Choice Awards	2010	Favorite Male Artist	Himself	Won	
People's Choice Awards	2010	Favorite Country Artist	Himself	Nominated	
People's Choice Awards	2011	Favorite Country Artist	Himself	Nominated	
People's Choice Awards	2012	Favorite Country Artist	Himself	Nominated	
People's Choice Awards	2016	Favorite Male Country Artist	Himself	Nominated	
People's Choice Awards	2017	Favorite Male Country Artist	Himself	Nominated	
People's Choice Awards	2018	The Male Artist of 2018	Himself	Nominated	
People's Choice Awards	2018	The Country Artist of 2018	Himself	Nominated	
People's Choice Awards	2020	The Country Artist of 2018	Himself	Nominated	
Queensland Music Awards	2018	Highest Selling Album	Ripcord	Won	
Queensland Music Awards	2021	Highest Selling Album	The Speed of Now Part 1	Won	
Queensland Music Awards	2022	Highest Selling Single	"One Too Many" (with Pink)	Won	
Rolling Stone Australia Awards	2021	Rolling Stone Global Award	Keith Urban	Nominated	
Rolling Stone Australia Awards	2022	Best Single	"Wild Hears"	Nominated	
Rolling Stone Australia Awards	2022	Rolling Stone Global Award	Keith Urban	Nominated	
Rolling Stone Australia Awards	2022	Rolling Stone Readers Award	Keith Urban	Nominated	
Rolling Stone Australia Awards	2023	Best Single	"Brown Eyes Baby"	Nominated	
Rolling Stone Australia Awards	2023	Rolling Stone Global Award	Keith Urban	Nominated	
Teen Choice Awards	2011	Choice Music: Male Country Artist	Himself	Won	
Teen Choice Awards	2014	Choice Music: Male Country Artist	Himself	Nominated	
Teen Choice Awards	2017	Choice Country Song	"The Fighter" (with Carrie Underwood)	Nominated	
