= More Than a Name on a Wall =

Single by The Statler Brothers

from the album Greatest Hits
- B-side: "Atlanta Blue"
- Released: April 1989
- Genre: Country
- Length: 2:54
- Label: Mercury Nashville
- Songwriters: Jimmy Fortune; John Rimel
- Producer: Jerry Kennedy

The Statler Brothers singles chronology
"Moon Pretty Moon" (1989)	"More Than a Name on a Wall" (1989)	"Don't Wait on Me" (1989)

"More Than a Name on a Wall" is a song written by Jimmy Fortune and John Rimel, and recorded by American country music group The Statler Brothers. It was released in April 1989 as the third single from their Greatest Hits compilation album. The song peaked at number 6 on the Billboard Hot Country Singles chart.

== Content ==
The song is about a mother visiting the Vietnam Wall to see her son's name.

== Chart performance ==
Chart (1989)	Peak position
Canada Country Singles (RPM)	13
US Hot Country Songs (Billboard)	6

=== Year-end charts ===
Chart (1989)	Position
US Country Songs (Billboard)	69
