= Guilty (The Statler Brothers song) =

Single by The Statler Brothers

from the album Today
- B-side: "I Never Want to Kiss You Goodbye"
- Released: July 1983
- Genre: Country
- Length: 3:01
- Label: Mercury Nashville
- Songwriter(s): Don Reid; Harold Reid
- Producer(s): Jerry Kennedy

The Statler Brothers singles chronology
"Oh Baby Mine (I Get So Lonely)" (1983)	"Guilty" (1983)	"Elizabeth" (1983)

"Guilty" is a song written by Don Reid and Harold Reid, and recorded by American country music group The Statler Brothers. It was released in July 1983 as the second single from their album Today. The song peaked at number 9 on the Billboard Hot Country Singles chart.

== Chart performance ==
Chart (1983)	Peak position
US Hot Country Songs (Billboard)	9
Canadian RPM Country Tracks	16
