= One Takes the Blame =

Single by The Statler Brothers

from the album Atlanta Blue
- B-side: "Give It Your Best"
- Released: July 1984
- Genre: Country
- Length: 3:30
- Label: Mercury Nashville
- Songwriter(s): Don Reid
- Producer(s): Jerry Kennedy

The Statler Brothers singles chronology
"Atlanta Blue" (1984)	"One Takes the Blame" (1984)	"My Only Love" (1984)

"One Takes the Blame" is a song written by Don Reid, and recorded by American country music group The Statler Brothers. It was released in July 1984 as the second single from their album Atlanta Blue. The song peaked at number 8 on the Billboard Hot Country Singles chart.

== Chart performance ==
Chart (1984)	Peak position
US Hot Country Songs (Billboard)	8
Canadian RPM Country Tracks	20
