= Sweeter and Sweeter =

Single by The Statler Brothers

from the album Pardners in Rhyme
- B-side: "Amazing Grace"
- Released: November 1985
- Genre: Country
- Length: 3:06
- Label: Mercury Nashville
- Songwriter(s): Don Reid; Harold Reid
- Producer(s): Jerry Kennedy

The Statler Brothers singles chronology
| "Too Much on My Heart" (1985) | "Sweeter and Sweeter" (1985) | "Count On Me" (1986) |

"Sweeter and Sweeter" is a song written by Don Reid and Harold Reid, and recorded by American country music group The Statler Brothers. It was released in November 1985 as the third single from their album Pardners in Rhyme. The song peaked at number 8 on the Billboard Hot Country Singles chart.

== Chart performance ==
| Chart (1985–1986) | Peak position |
|---|---|
| US Hot Country Songs (Billboard) | 8 |
| Canadian RPM Country Tracks | 34 |
