= Atlanta Blue (album) =

Studio album by The Statler Brothers
- Released: 1984
- Genre: Country
- Length: 30:37
- Label: Mercury
- Producer: Jerry Kennedy

The Statler Brothers chronology
| Today (1983) | Atlanta Blue (1984) | Pardners in Rhyme (1985) |

Singles from Atlanta Blue
- 1. "Atlanta Blue" Released: March 1984; 2. "One Takes the Blame" Released: July 1984; 3. "My Only Love" Released: November 1984

Professional ratings
Review scores
| Source | Rating |
|---|---|
| Allmusic | 4.5/5 stars |

Atlanta Blue is the twenty-fifth studio album by American country music group The Statler Brothers. It was released in 1984 via Mercury Records. The album peaked at number 177 on the Billboard 200 chart.

== Track listing ==
| No. | Title | Writer(s) | Length |
|---|---|---|---|
| 1. | "Atlanta Blue" | Don Reid | 2:47 |
| 2. | "If It Makes Any Difference" | D. Reid, Harold Reid | 3:32 |
| 3. | "(Let's Just) Take One Night at a Time" | Kim Reid | 2:28 |
| 4. | "Angel in Her Face" | D. Reid | 3:07 |
| 5. | "Hollywood" | D. Reid | 2:48 |
| 6. | "One Takes the Blame" | D. Reid | 3:30 |
| 7. | "Give It Your Best" | D. Reid | 3:14 |
| 8. | "No Love Lost" | Jimmy Fortune, John Rimel | 3:31 |
| 9. | "One Size Fits All" | Rimel | 2:25 |
| 10. | "My Only Love" | Fortune | 3:15 |

== Charts ==
=== Weekly charts ===
| Chart (1984) | Peak position |
|---|---|
| US Billboard 200 | 177 |
| US Top Country Albums (Billboard) | 8 |

=== Year-end charts ===
| Chart (1984) | Position |
|---|---|
| US Top Country Albums (Billboard) | 33 |
| Chart (1985) | Position |
| US Top Country Albums (Billboard) | 15 |
