= Me and My Broken Heart (Rex Allen Jr. song) =

Single by Rex Allen Jr.

from the album Me and My Broken Heart
- B-side: "Lovin' You Is Everything To Me"
- Released: 1979
- Genre: Countrypolitan
- Length: 2:52
- Label: Warner Bros.
- Songwriter(s): Curtis Allen
- Producer(s): Buddy Killen

"Me and My Broken Heart" is a song recorded by Rex Allen Jr., which he released in 1979 as a single and on his album of the same name. It was written by Rex Allen Jr.'s brother, Curtis Allen. It spent 11 weeks on Billboard's Hot Country Singles chart, reaching No. 9, while reaching No. 7 on Record World's Country Singles chart, and No. 13 on the Cash Box Top 100 Country chart.

== Chart performance ==
Chart (1979)	Peak position
US Billboard Hot Country Singles	9
US Cash Box Country Top 50	13
US Record World Top Country Singles	7
