= I'll Go to My Grave Loving You =

Single by The Statler Brothers

from the album The Best of the Statler Brothers
- B-side: "You've Been Like a Mother to Me"
- Released: May 1975
- Genre: Country
- Length: 2:30
- Label: Mercury
- Songwriter: Don Reid
- Producer: Jerry Kennedy

The Statler Brothers singles chronology
"All American Girl" (1975)	"I'll Go to My Grave Loving You" (1975)	"How Great Thou Art" (1976)

"I'll Go to My Grave Loving You" is a song written by Don Reid, and recorded by American country music group the Statler Brothers. It was released in May 1975 as the first single from their compilation album The Best of the Statler Brothers. The song peaked at number three on the Billboard Hot Country Singles chart and number one on the Cashbox Country Top 100. It also reached number one on the RPM Country Tracks chart in Canada. It is based upon a song by Harold Reid, another member of the group, called "He Went to the Cross Loving You".

== Chart performance ==
Chart (1975)	Peak position
US Hot Country Songs (Billboard)	3
US Billboard Hot 100	93
Canadian RPM Country Tracks	1
