= Years Ago (song) =

Single by The Statler Brothers

from the album Years Ago
- B-side: "Dad"
- Released: October 24, 1981
- Genre: Country
- Length: 2:24
- Label: Mercury
- Songwriter(s): Don Reid
- Producer(s): Jerry Kennedy

The Statler Brothers singles chronology
"Don't Wait on Me" (1981)	"Years Ago" (1981)	"You'll Be Back (Every Night in My Dreams)" (1982)

"Years Ago" is a song written by Don Reid, and recorded by American country music group The Statler Brothers. It was released in October 1981 as the third single and title track from the album Years Ago. The song reached #12 on the Billboard Hot Country Single & Tracks chart.

== Chart performance ==
Chart (1981–1982)	Peak position
US Hot Country Songs (Billboard)	12
