= Pardners in Rhyme =

Studio album by The Statler Brothers
- Released: November 21, 1985
- Genre: Country
- Length: 31:45
- Label: Mercury
- Producer: Jerry Kennedy

The Statler Brothers chronology
Atlanta Blue (1984)	Pardners in Rhyme (1985)	Christmas Present (1985)

Singles from Pardners in Rhyme
- 1. "Too Much on My Heart" Released: July 1985; 2. "Sweeter and Sweeter" Released: November 1985

Professional ratings
Review scores
Source	Rating
AllMusic	4.5/5 stars

Pardners in Rhyme is the twenty-sixth studio album by American country music group the Statler Brothers. It was released in 1985 via Mercury Records. The album peaked at number 1 on the Billboard Top Country Albums chart.

== Track listing ==
No.	Title	Writer(s)	Length
1.	"Hello Mary Lou"	Cayet Mangiarasina, Gene Pitney	2:17
2.	"Sweeter and Sweeter"	Don Reid, Harold Reid	3:06
3.	"Memory Lane"	Jimmy Fortune	2:37
4.	"Remembering You"	D. Reid, H. Reid	2:50
5.	"Too Much on My Heart"	Jimmy Fortune	4:02
6.	"I'm Sorry You Had to Be the One"	D. Reid, H. Reid, Fortune	3:31
7.	"Her Heart or Mine"	D. Reid, H. Reid	2:53
8.	"You Don't Wear Blue So Well"	Cody Reid, Karmen Reid, Kim Reid	2:31
9.	"Autumn Leaves"	Fortune	2:36
10.	"Amazing Grace"	Arranged by D. Reid, H. Reid, Fortune, Phil Balsley	5:15

== Charts ==
=== Weekly charts ===
Chart (1985)	Peak position
US Top Country Albums (Billboard)	1

=== Year-end charts ===
Chart (1985)	Position
US Top Country Albums (Billboard)	19
Chart (1986)	Position
US Top Country Albums (Billboard)	15
