= The Statler Brothers Show =

American country music TV variety series hosted by the Statler Brothers

The Statler Brothers Show is an American television variety show hosted by country music group The Statler Brothers. The show ran for seven seasons from 1991 to 1998 on The Nashville Network (TNN) as part of the network's Saturday night lineup and became the most popular show on TNN, including being the highest rated show in the network's history. The show's theme music is an instrumental of "The Class of '57," one of the Statlers' biggest hits as performed by the Bill Walker Orchestra, which along with the Statlers' band, provided all the music for the show.

== Format ==
Each episode of the program opened with a performance by the Statlers of one of their biggest hits, followed by comedy interludes from group member Harold Reid. Other regulars on the show over the course of its run included fellow country artists Rex Allen, Jr., Janie Fricke, Crystal Gayle, and Ronna Reeves, who would also perform their songs on the show. There was also a segment that featured magicians, jugglers, acrobats, etc.

The show also featured a segment called "Yesteryear," in which a year in history was remembered through songs released in that year as well as description of events that occurred in that year as performed and told respectively by the Statlers and the regulars. The segment became so popular at one point that it developed into a stand-alone spin-off series hosted by Allen and Fricke which also aired on TNN, but it was short-lived. After "Yesteryear," a similar segment was introduced called "Music Mail Time," in which viewers could write in and request popular songs to be performed by the Statlers and the regulars.

Sherry Page served as voice-over announcer, who would introduce the show. The Statlers always affectionately referred to her as "The sweet voice of Sherry Page." Also, two models named Sharon and Tamara were featured on the show, who held up cards announcing upcoming performances upon the episode's return from commercial breaks and sometimes assisted Harold in his comedy antics.

Each episode also included major country music guest stars who performed their hits of the day, and the show always closed with a gospel song performed by the Statlers, accompanied by Bill Walker on piano.

== Reruns ==
For a brief time, RFD-TV aired performance clips from selected episodes of the series condensed into half-hour episodes as part of the network's Saturday night lineup, which included "Yesteryear" and gospel segments.
