= Rex Allen Jr. =

American country music singer (born 1947)

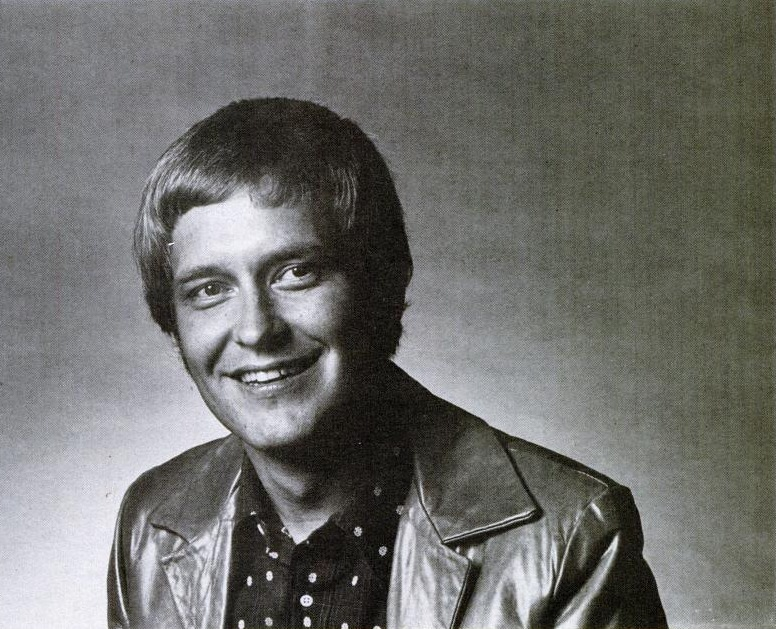

Background information
- Born: Rex Elvie Allen Jr. August 23, 1947 (age 78); Chicago, Illinois, U.S.
- Genres: Country; countrypolitan
- Occupations: Singer; songwriter
- Instruments: Vocals; guitar
- Years active: 1971–present
- Labels: Warner Bros.; Plantation
- Website: rexallenjr.com

Rex Elvie Allen Jr. (born August 23, 1947) is an American country music singer. He is the son of Rex Allen.

== Early life ==
Allen was born in Chicago, Illinois, United States, the son of Rex Allen.

== Career ==
Singing in the "countrypolitan" style, he had hits with "Goodbye" (1974), "I'm Gettin Good at Missing You (Solitaire)" (1977), "Lonely Street" (1977), "Two Less Lonely People" (1977), "With Love" (1978), "If I Fell in Love With You" (1979), "It's Over" (1980), "Drink it Down, Lady" (1980), "Cup of Tea" (1980, a duet with Margo Smith) and others. He is also the composer and performer of the alternate state anthem of Arizona, entitled "Arizona".

Allen was a regular on The Statler Brothers Show on TNN in the 1990s, and he hosted the spin-off series, Yesteryear. Allen was also the recurring narrator in the 2000 movie "Me, Myself & Irene" starring Jim Carrey and Renee Zellweger.

== Discography ==
=== Studio albums ===
Title	Album details	Peak positions
Title	Album details	US Country
Today's Generation	Release year: 1971; Label: SSS International	—
Another Goodbye Song	Release year: 1974; Label: Warner Bros.	45
Ridin' High	Release year: 1976; Label: Warner Bros.	31
Rex	Release year: 1977; Label: Warner Bros.	42
Brand New	Release year: 1978; Label: Warner Bros.	45
Me and My Broken Heart	Release year: 1979; Label: Warner Bros.	—
Oklahoma Rose	Release year: 1980; Label: Warner Bros.	69
Cat's in the Cradle	Release year: 1981; Label: Warner Bros.	—
The Singing Cowboy	Release year: 1982; Label: Warner Bros.	—
On the Move	Release year: 1984; Label: Moonshine	—
The Singing Cowboys (with Rex Allen)	Release year: 1995; Label: Warner Western	—
"—" denotes releases that did not chart

=== Compilation albums ===
Title	Album details	Peak positions
Title	Album details	US Country
The Best of Rex	Release year: 1977; Label: Warner Bros.	47
The Very Best of Rex Allen, Jr.	Release year: 1994; Label: Warner Bros.	—
"—" denotes releases that did not chart

=== Singles ===
Year	Single	Peak positions		Album
Year	Single	US Country	CAN Country	Album
1973	"The Great Mail Robbery"	63	87	Another Goodbye Song
1974	"Goodbye"^{[A]}	19	—	Another Goodbye Song
1974	"Another Goodbye Song"	31	—	Another Goodbye Song
1974	"Never Coming Back Again"	36	—	Another Goodbye Song
1975	"Lying in My Arms"	70	—	Rex
1976	"Play Me No Sad Songs"	34	—	Ridin' High
1976	"Can You Hear Those Pioneers"^{[B]}	17	13	Ridin' High
1976	"Teardrops in My Heart"	18	—	Ridin' High
1976	"Two Less Lonely People"	8	4	Rex
1977	"I'm Getting Good at Missing You (Solitaire)"	10	17	Rex
1977	"Don't Say Goodbye"	15	—	Rex
1977	"Lonely Street"	8	14	The Best of Rex
1978	"No, No, No (I'd Rather Be Free)"	8	4	Brand New
1978	"With Love"	10	7	Brand New
1978	"It's Time We Talk Things Over" (with The Boys)	12	13	Brand New
1979	"Me and My Broken Heart"	9	—	Me and My Broken Heart
1979	"If I Fell in Love with You"	18	—	Me and My Broken Heart
1980	"Yippy Cry Yi"	25	—	Oklahoma Rose
1980	"It's Over"	14	35	Oklahoma Rose
1980	"Drink It Down, Lady"	25	—	Oklahoma Rose
1980	"Cup of Tea" (with Margo Smith)	12	—	The Cat's in the Cradle
1981	"Just a Country Boy"	35	—	The Cat's in the Cradle
1981	"While the Feeling's Good" (with Margo Smith)	26	—	Non-album single
1982	"Last of the Silver Screen Cowboys"	43	—	The Singing Cowboy
1982	"Cowboy in a Three Piece Business Suit"	44	—	The Singing Cowboy
1982	"Ride Cowboy Ride"	85	—	The Singing Cowboy
1983	"The Air That I Breathe"	37	—	On the Move
1984	"Sweet Rosanna"	44	—	On the Move
1984	"Dream On Texas Ladies"	18	—	On the Move
1984	"Running Down Memory Lane"	24	—	On the Move
1985	"When You Held Me in Your Arms"	62	—	On the Move
1987	"We're Staying Together"	59	—	Non-album single
"—" denotes releases that did not chart

== Notes ==
- A "Goodbye" also peaked at number 34 on the U.S. Adult Contemporary chart.
- B "Can You Hear Those Pioneers" also peaked at number 100 on the Canadian RPM Top Singles chart.
