= Too Much on My Heart =

Single by The Statler Brothers

from the album Pardners in Rhyme
- B-side: "Her Heart or Mine"
- Released: July 1985
- Genre: Country
- Length: 4:02
- Label: Mercury
- Songwriter(s): Jimmy Fortune
- Producer(s): Jerry Kennedy

The Statler Brothers singles chronology
"Hello Mary Lou" (1985)	"Too Much on My Heart" (1985)	"Sweeter and Sweeter" (1985)

"Too Much on My Heart" is a song written by Jimmy Fortune, and recorded by American country music group The Statler Brothers. It was released in July 1985 as the second single from the album Pardners in Rhyme. The song was The Statler Brothers' last of four number ones on the country chart. The single stayed at number one for one week and spent a total of fourteen weeks on the country chart.

== Chart performance ==
Chart (1985)	Peak position
US Hot Country Songs (Billboard)	1
Canadian RPM Country Tracks	1
