= Atlanta Blue =

Single by The Statler Brothers

from the album Atlanta Blue
- B-side: "If It Makes Any Difference"
- Released: March 1984
- Genre: Country
- Length: 2:47
- Label: Mercury Nashville
- Songwriter(s): Don Reid
- Producer(s): Jerry Kennedy

The Statler Brothers singles chronology
| "Elizabeth" (1983) | "Atlanta Blue" (1984) | "One Takes the Blame" (1984) |

"Atlanta Blue" is a song written by Don Reid, and recorded by American country music group The Statler Brothers. It was released in March 1984 as the first single and title track from their album Atlanta Blue. The song peaked at number 3 on the Billboard Hot Country Singles chart.

== Charts ==
=== Weekly charts ===
| Chart (1984) | Peak position |
|---|---|
| US Hot Country Songs (Billboard) | 3 |
| Canadian RPM Country Tracks | 2 |

=== Year-end charts ===
| Chart (1984) | Position |
|---|---|
| US Hot Country Songs (Billboard) | 44 |
