= Elizabeth (The Statler Brothers song) =

Single by The Statler Brothers

from the album Today
- B-side: "The Class of '57"
- Released: November 1983
- Genre: Country
- Length: 3:26
- Label: Mercury
- Songwriter: Jimmy Fortune
- Producer: Jerry Kennedy

The Statler Brothers singles chronology
"Guilty" (1984)	"Elizabeth" (1983)	"Atlanta Blue" (1985)

"Elizabeth" is a song written by Jimmy Fortune, and recorded by American country music group The Statler Brothers. It was released in November 1983 as the second single from the album Today. The song was The Statler Brothers' 44th country hit and their second number one on the country charts. The single went to number one for one week and spent a total of 13 weeks on the country charts.

== Background ==
"Elizabeth" is the first song written by Jimmy Fortune, which he wrote soon after joining The Statler Brothers (Fortune had replaced Lew DeWitt, who departed the group in 1982 after a chronic illness). Fortune already had a tune in mind, and he was inspired to title the song "Elizabeth" after watching a film, Giant starring Elizabeth Taylor, before a show, and then met a young girl who introduced herself as Elizabeth in the audience during the show. The Statler Brothers would later perform the song for Elizabeth Taylor on her 52nd birthday.

The song was the first No. 1 Statler Brothers' hit to feature Fortune on lead vocals. A music video for "Elizabeth" was produced, but is not included on the Statler Brothers VEVO page or elsewhere.

Bluegrass music band Dailey & Vincent covered the song on their 2010 album Dailey & Vincent Sing the Statler Brothers. This version was nominated for the 2011 Grammy Award for Best Country Performance by a Duo or Group with Vocal.

== Charts ==
=== Weekly charts ===
Chart (1983–1984)	Peak position
US Hot Country Songs (Billboard)	1
Canadian RPM Country Tracks	12

=== Year-end charts ===
Chart (1984)	Position
US Hot Country Songs (Billboard)	5
