= My Only Love (song) =

Single by The Statler Brothers

from the album Atlanta Blue
- B-side: "Take One Night at a Time"
- Released: November 1984
- Genre: Country
- Length: 3:15
- Label: Mercury 880411-7
- Songwriter(s): Jimmy Fortune
- Producer(s): Jerry Kennedy

The Statler Brothers singles chronology
"One Takes the Blame" (1984)	"My Only Love" (1984)	"Hello Mary Lou" (1985)

"My Only Love" is a song written by Jimmy Fortune and recorded by American country music group The Statler Brothers. It was released in November 1984 as the third and final single from their album Atlanta Blue. The song reached Number One on the Billboard Hot Country Singles chart in March 1985.

== Chart performance ==
Chart (1984–1985)	Peak position
US Hot Country Songs (Billboard)	1
Canadian RPM Country Tracks	3
