= Jimmy Fortune =

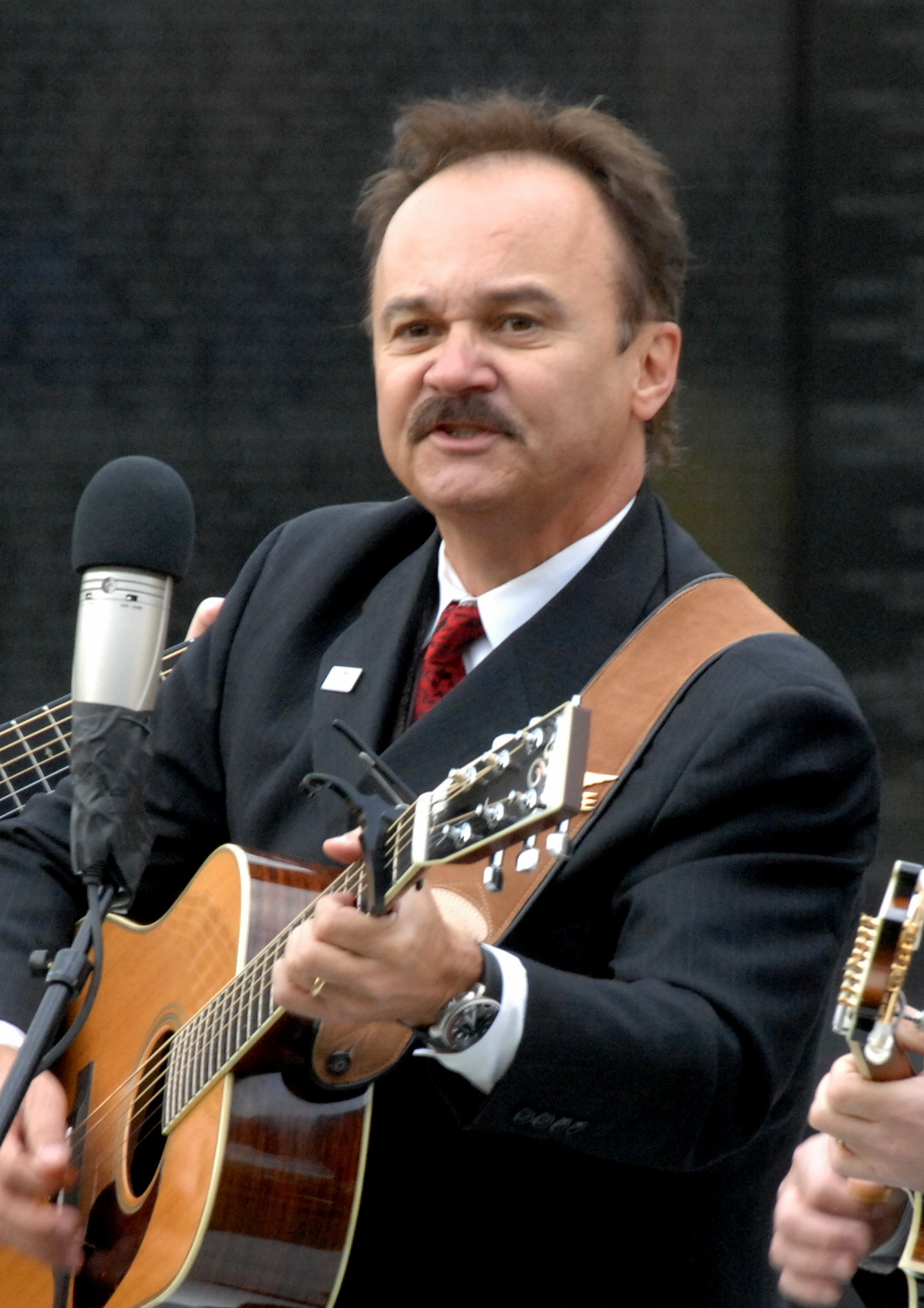
- Fortune (2007)

Background information
- Born: Lester James Fortune; March 11, 1955 (age 71); Williamsburg, Virginia
- Origin: Nelson County, Virginia
- Genres: Country
- Occupation: Singer
- Instruments: Vocals, guitar
- Years active: 1982–present
- Labels: Audium; Song Garden; Fortune Enterprises
- Formerly of: The Statler Brothers
- Website: Official Website

Lester James Fortune Sr. (born March 11, 1955) is an American country music singer from Nelson County, Virginia. Fortune sang tenor for The Statler Brothers for 21 years, and wrote the song "Elizabeth" for the group. When the Statler Brothers disbanded, he began to perform as a solo artist.

Fortune was inducted into the Country Music Hall of Fame in 2008 as a member of The Statler Brothers.

== Biography ==
Fortune grew up in Nelson County, Virginia, where he attended Nelson County High School in Lovingston, Virginia.

The original tenor of the Statler Brothers, Lew DeWitt, heard Fortune sing at a local ski resort. DeWitt suffered from Crohn's disease and asked Fortune to audition for the band. Fortune started performing with the Statlers in 1982, originally as a temporary replacement. He joined permanently when DeWitt left due to ill health.

Fortune wrote several number-one songs recorded by the Statler Brothers, including "Elizabeth", "Too Much on My Heart", and "My Only Love". "More Than a Name on a Wall" was a top-10 country hit. He spent 21 years touring, singing, and performing with the Statler Brothers.

After the Statlers disbanded in 2002, Fortune continued his career as a solo artist with an extensive performance schedule in the U.S. and Canada. He has continued as a songwriter and has recorded some projects in Nashville. In 2015, he released Hits & Hymns produced by Ben Isaacs. The album reached the Top Ten on Billboard's Top Country Albums chart. The DVD release of a TV special, "Jimmy Fortune: Hits & Hymns," hosted by Bill Gaither, debuted at number one on the Billboard Music Video chart. In 2020, Fortune joined Bradley Walker, Ben Isaacs, and Mike Rogers to form Brothers of the Heart. They have released three albums to date: Brotherly Love (2020), Listen To The Music (2023), and Will The Circle Be Unbroken (2023).

In 2023, a bronze statue of Fortune was unveiled in Nelson County, Virginia. Fortune attended the ceremony, where a statue of fellow Nelson County native Earl Hamner Jr. was also dedicated.

== Discography ==
=== Albums ===
Title	Details	Peak chart positions			Sales
Title	Details	US Country	US	US Christ	Sales
When One Door Closes	Release date: August 12, 2003; Label: Audium Entertainment	—	—	—	
I Believe	Release date: December 27, 2005; Label: Fortune Enterprises	—	—	—	
Feels Like Christmas	Release date: November 29, 2007; Label: Fortune 4	—	—	—	
Windows	Release date: December 8, 2009; Label: Fortune Enterprises	—	—	—	
Lessons	Release date: August 28, 2012; Label: Fortune Enterprises	—	—	—	
Hits & Hymns	Release date: October 23, 2015; Label: Gaither Music Group	10	156	6	US: 42,800
Sings the Classics	Release date: April 21, 2017; Label: Spring House Music Group	—	—	—	US: 13,400
God & Country	Release date: May 24, 2019; Label: Gaither Music Group	—	—	11	US: 7,400
"—" denotes releases that did not chart

=== Singles ===
Year	Single	Album
2003	"What Money Can't Buy"	When One Door Closes
2004	"Elizabeth"	When One Door Closes

=== Guest singles ===
Year	Single	Artist	Album
2013	"God Bless the Children" (with Wayne Warner and the Nashville All-Star Choir)	Turbo Twang'n	
2013	"Working on a Building"	Marty Raybon (with T. Graham Brown & Trace Adkins)	Working on a Building

=== Music videos ===
Year	Video	Director
1997	"Dare the World" (Various Artists)	John Lloyd Miller
