= Lew DeWitt =

American singer-songwriter

Background information
- Born: Lewis Calvin DeWitt Jr. March 12, 1938; Roanoke, Virginia, U.S.
- Died: August 15, 1990 (aged 52) Waynesboro, Virginia, U.S.
- Genre: Country
- Occupations: Musician, songwriter
- Instruments: Guitar, vocals
- Years active: 1955–1982 (with The Statler Brothers); 1985-1990 (as a solo artist)
- Labels: Columbia, Mercury, Compleat
- Formerly of: The Statler Brothers

Lewis Calvin DeWitt Jr. (March 12, 1938 – August 15, 1990) was an American country music singer, guitarist, and composer. He was a founding member of the Statler Brothers and the group's original tenor.

== Biography ==
For most of his career, DeWitt sang tenor for the Statler Brothers. Songs he wrote for the group include "Flowers on the Wall"— a major pop and country hit in the mid-1960s that made the group popular — "The Junkie's Prayer", "Things", "Since Then", "The Strand", "Chet Atkins' Hand", and the hits "Thank You World" and "The Movies". In 1968, the group was under contract to Columbia Records when DeWitt recorded a solo single, "She Went a Little Bit Farther" backed with "Brown Eyes", the latter of which was penned by DeWitt.

In November of 1981, DeWitt took a leave of absence from the Statlers due to surgery and treatment for Crohn's disease, from which he had suffered since adolescence. At his suggestion, Jimmy Fortune was tapped as a temporary replacement. DeWitt rejoined in June of the following year (with Fortune having been offered a permanent position in the group's backing band), but this arrangement lasted less than a week. DeWitt officially retired that same month, with Fortune becoming his permanent replacement.

Three years later, DeWitt, feeling that his health had gradually improved through continued treatment, decided to pursue a solo career. During this time, he returned to touring and released two albums, Here to Stay (1984) and On My Own (1985). The latter album gave Dewitt his only solo chart appearance with a cover of "You'll Never Know", which made it to number 77. He remained with the Compleat label through 1987.

DeWitt was married three times. From 1961 through 1973, he was married to Glenda Kay Simmers, with whom he had two sons and two daughters. He was later married to Joyce Anne Arehart, and then Judy Fitzgerald Wells.

DeWitt remained active as a performer through 1989, when his health declined, culminating in his death on August 15, 1990, in Waynesboro, Virginia. The cause of death was heart and kidney disease, due to complications of Crohn's. Lew Dewitt Boulevard was named in his honor in Waynesboro in 1992.

In 2008, DeWitt was inducted into the Country Music Hall of Fame as a member of the Statler Brothers.

In 2011, amateur video of DeWitt performing at the Burley Tobacco Festival in the late 1980s surfaced and was posted onto YouTube. The set is notable for the inclusion of what became his final single, "Moonset".

None of DeWitt's solo recordings were released in any digital format until 2022, when most of his discography was finally released on Spotify, Apple Music, and other streaming services.

== Discography ==
=== Albums ===
Year	Album	Label
1984	Here to Stay	Self-released
1985	On My Own	Compleat

=== Singles ===
Year	A-Side	B-Side	US Country	Label	Album
1967	"She Went a Little Bit Farther"	"Brown Eyes"	—	Columbia	single only
1985	"You'll Never Know"	"Wanda Glen"	77	Compleat	On My Own
1986	"I Love Virginia"	"She Must Have Lovin' Eyes"	—	Compleat	On My Own
1986	"Hello Houston"	"Don't Our Love Look Natural"	—	Compleat	single only
1987	"Slow Dance"	"Welcome to the Holiday Inn"	—	Compleat	single only
1990	"Moonset"	"Moonset"	—	Oak	single only

== Notes ==
1."Welcome to the Holiday Inn" was previously released on the On My Own album.
