= The Statler Brothers =

American country music, gospel, and vocal group

- A promotional image of the Statler Brothers, 1970s: From left to right: Harold Reid, Don Reid, Phil Balsley, and Lew DeWitt.

Background information
- Also known as: The Four Star Quartet; The Kingsmen; The Carolinas; Lester "Roadhog" Moran and the Cadillac Cowboys
- Origin: Staunton, Virginia, U.S.
- Genres: Country; traditional pop; gospel
- Years active: 1955–2002
- Labels: Columbia; Mercury; Music Box; Yell
- Past members: Joe McDorman; Harold Reid; James Blackwood; Phil Balsley; Lew DeWitt; Don Reid; Jimmy Fortune
- Website: thestatlerbrothers.com

The Statler Brothers (sometimes referred to as The Statlers) were an American vocal group from Staunton, Virginia. Formed in 1955, they went on to become the opening act and backup singers for Johnny Cash, which led to their own successful careers.

== Career ==
The group began as the amateur Four Star Quartet in Staunton, Virginia, performing in local churches. In 1959, after Don Reid replaced original lead singer Joe McDorman, they reorganized as the Kingsmen and developed three distinct shows — country, pop, and gospel — tailored to different venues in their region. They performed their gospel program on Sundays and their country and pop shows during the week, with a repertoire including country tributes, pop standards, and impersonations of popular artists.

In 1963, after the song "Louie, Louie" by the rock band the Kingsmen was a major hit, and with a gospel group in the Carolinas also using the name, another name change was in order. Taking a cue from a box of facial tissue in their hotel, Don Reid, Harold Reid, Phil Balsley, and Lew DeWitt were known from then on as the Statler Brothers, although only two of them were actual brothers.

In 1964, the fully professional Statler Brothers commenced an eight-year run as Johnny Cash's opening act and backing vocalists, which included singing on his At Folsom Prison album and appearing weekly on The Johnny Cash Show, the ABC series that ran from 1969 to 1971. The next year, the Statlers quit the Cash tour to focus on their own careers.

Although they were a quartet who occasionally recorded and performed gospel songs, they never considered themselves a gospel act ("we were not gospel") and James Blackwood said, "If the Statler Brothers had ever decided to come fully into the gospel field, they would have been the best gospel quartet ever in the business.” When signing at Mercury in 1970, the Statlers resolved to be "strictly country. No more pop or crossover targets, just country like we'd always wanted to be."

Among their best-known songs are their major pop hit, "Flowers on the Wall", written by Lew DeWitt, and country hits including "Bed of Rose's", "Do You Remember These", "The Class of '57", and "I'll Go to My Grave Loving You".

When their years as a country radio mainstay ended, the Statlers went into television. From 1991 until 1998, they hosted The Statler Brothers Show, a weekly variety show, which was the top-rated program on the Nashville Network (TNN) throughout its seven-year run.

Throughout the Statlers' career, much of their appeal was related to their incorporation of comedy into their act, on stage and on television. This even extended to recording a comedy album as Lester "Roadhog" Moran and the Cadillac Cowboys, an alter ego they introduced on Country Music Then and Now in 1972.

In 1980, the Statlers purchased and renovated their former elementary school, Beverley Manor, in Staunton, occupying the complex for more than two decades. The complex included offices for the group, a small museum, and an auditorium. A garage was built to store their tour buses.

In 1970, the group performed an Independence Day festival in Gypsy Hill Park in Staunton. The event, known as "Happy Birthday USA", went on for 25 years, often drawing in excess of 100,000 fans.

Lew DeWitt retired in 1982 after years of ill health. After a two-year hiatus, he undertook a solo career to the extent that his health permitted. He died in 1990, aged 52.

DeWitt was replaced by Jimmy Fortune, who wrote the group's final major hit, "More Than a Name on a Wall", in 1989. The Statlers reached the number-one spot on the Billboard chart four times in all: "Do You Know You Are My Sunshine", "Elizabeth", "My Only Love", and "Too Much on My Heart"; the last three were written by Fortune.

== Retirement ==
The group disbanded and retired after completing their farewell tour in 2002. Phil Balsley and Don Reid continue to reside in Staunton, as did Harold Reid until his death in 2020 after a long battle with kidney failure, aged 80. Jimmy Fortune relocated to Nashville, continuing his career as a solo artist. The Statlers remain one of the most awarded acts in the history of country music.

Don Reid has pursued a second career as an author, including Random Memories, co-written with Harold Reid, in 2008. In 2020, Don Reid wrote a complete anthology of the Statlers' songs, titled The Music of the Statler Brothers.

== Legacy ==
Kim and Karmen Reid (daughters of Harold) enjoyed a brief stint as a country duo in the 1980s. Wil and Langdon Reid, sons of Harold and Don, respectively, formed a duo in the 1990s. Originally billed as Grandstaff, they are now known as Wilson Fairchild. In 2007, they recorded "The Statler Brothers Song" in tribute to the Statlers. Their sons, Jack and Davis Reid, now perform together as a duo.

== Influence ==
The Statler Brothers have been credited as the first country music act to transfer the genre's nostalgia from a rural to a suburban setting. They were called "America's Poets" by Kurt Vonnegut. Bluegrass duo Dailey & Vincent often sing with two members of their band as a quartet in the style of the Statlers, including many Statlers' hits in their shows. Jimmy Fortune sometimes performs with Dailey and Vincent.

== Members and years active ==
- Joe McDorman – lead (1955–1959)
- Lew DeWitt – tenor and guitar (1955–1982; died 1990)
- Phil Balsley – baritone (1955–2002)
- James Blackwood - baritone (1955-1956; died 2002)
- Harold Reid – bass (1955–2002; died 2020)
- Don Reid – lead (1959–2002)
- Jimmy Fortune – tenor and guitar (1982–2002)

== Awards ==
Grammy Awards

- 1965 Best Contemporary (R&R) Performance – Group (Vocal or Instrumental) – "Flowers on the Wall"
- 1965 Best New Country & Western Artist
- 1972 Best Country Vocal Performance by a Duo or Group – "The Class of '57"

American Music Awards

- Favorite Country Band, Duo or Group 1979
- Favorite Country Band, Duo or Group 1980
- Favorite Country Band, Duo or Group 1981

Academy of Country Music

- 1972 Top Vocal Group
- 1977 Top Vocal Group
- 2016 Cliffie Stone Pioneer Award

Country Music Association

- 1972 Vocal Group of the Year
- 1973 Vocal Group of the Year
- 1974 Vocal Group of the Year
- 1975 Vocal Group of the Year
- 1976 Vocal Group of the Year
- 1977 Vocal Group of the Year
- 1979 Vocal Group of the Year
- 1980 Vocal Group of the Year
- 1984 Vocal Group of the Year

Country Music Hall of Fame and Museum

- Inducted in 2008

Gospel Hall of Fame

- Inducted in 2007
