= Juice Newton discography =

American singer

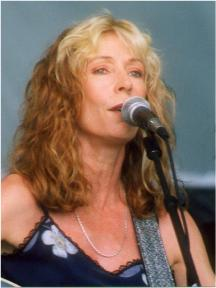
- Juice Newton
- Studio albums: 17
- Live albums: 1
- Compilation albums: 10
- Singles: 39
- Video albums: 1
- Music videos: 9
- Guest appearances: 3
- Audiobooks: 2
- Backing vocalist: 2

The discography of American singer Juice Newton consists of 17 studio albums, one live album, 10 compilation albums, 39 singles, one video album, nine music videos, five guest appearances on all-star tribute albums, and dramatic readings in two audiobook anthologies.

== Studio albums ==
=== Juice Newton & Silver Spur ===
Title	Album details
Juice Newton & Silver Spur	Release date: September 1975; Label: RCA
After the Dust Settles	Release date: 1976; Label: RCA
Come to Me	Release date: 1977; Label: Capitol

=== Juice Newton ===
==== 1970s and 1980s ====
Title	Album details	Peak chart positions					Certifications (sales threshold)
Title	Album details	US Country	US	AUS	CAN	NZ	Certifications (sales threshold)
Well Kept Secret	Release date: August 14, 1978; Label: Capitol	—	—	—	—	—	
Take Heart	Release date: September 17, 1979; Label: Capitol	—	—	—	—	—	
Juice	Release date: February 9, 1981; Label: Capitol	4	22	46	16	33	CAN: 3× Platinum; US: Platinum
Quiet Lies	Release date: May 10, 1982; Label: Capitol	7	20	—	36	—	CAN: Platinum; US: Gold
Dirty Looks	Release date: August 19, 1983; Label: Capitol	22	52	—	61	—	CAN: Gold
Can't Wait All Night	Release date: June 18, 1984; Label: RCA	42	128	—	91	—	
Old Flame	Release date: October 21, 1985; Label: RCA	12	—	—	—	—	
Emotion	Release date: September 15, 1987; Label: RCA	59	—	—	—	—	
Ain't Gonna Cry	Release date: June 28, 1989; Label: RCA	—	—	—	—	—	
"—" denotes releases that did not chart

==== 1990s–2010s ====
Title	Album details
The Trouble with Angels	Release date: April 28, 1998; Label: River North
American Girl	Release date: October 12, 1999; Label: Renaissance
The Gift of Christmas	Release date: 2007; Label: OJM
Duets: Friends & Memories	Release date: October 25, 2010; Label: Fuel 2000

== Compilation albums ==
Title	Album details	Peak chart positions				Certifications (sales threshold)
Title	Album details	US Country	US	AUS	CAN	Certifications (sales threshold)
Greatest Hits	Release date: June 15, 1984; Label: Capitol	64	178	69	95	US: Gold
Juice Newton's Greatest Hits (And More)	Release date: 1987; Label: Capitol	—	—	—	—	
Greatest Country Hits	Release date: September 10, 1990; Label: Curb	—	—	—	—	
Greatest Hits	Release date: 1992; Label: CEMA Special Markets	—	—	—	—	
The Early Years	Release date: March 24, 1992; Label: RCA	—	—	—	—	
Emotions	Release date: February 7, 1994; Label: Pair	—	—	—	—	
Anthology	Release date: March 17, 1998; Label: Renaissance	—	—	—	—	
Country Classics	Release date: December 3, 2002; Label: EMI	—	—	—	—	
American Girl, Volume 2	Release date: 2003; Label: Self-released	—	—	—	—	
All American Country	Release date: October 24, 2003; Label: BMG Special Products	—	—	—	—	
American Legend	Release date: October 14, 2008; Label: American Legends	—	—	—	—	
The Ultimate Hits Collection	Release date: July 26, 2011; Label: Fuel	—	—	—	—	
"—" denotes releases that did not chart

== Live album ==
Title	Album details
Every Road Leads Back to You	Release date: 2002; Label: Image Entertainment

== Singles ==
=== Juice Newton & Silver Spur ===
Year	Single	Peak positions	Album
Year	Single	US Country	Album
1975	"Catwillow River"	—	Juice Newton and Silver Spur
1975	"Shelter of Your Love"	—	Juice Newton and Silver Spur
1976	"Love Is a Word"	88	Juice Newton and Silver Spur
1976	"If I Ever"	—	After the Dust Settles
1977	"Come to Me"	—	Come to Me
1977	"Low Down and Lonesome"	—	Come to Me
"—" denotes releases that did not chart

=== Juice Newton ===
Year	Single	Peak chart positions								Certifications (sales threshold)	Album
Year	Single	US Country	US	US AC	CAN Country	CAN	CAN AC	NZ	AUS	Certifications (sales threshold)	Album
1978	"It's a Heartache"	—	86	—	—	91	—	—	—		—N/a
1978	"Hey! Baby"	—	—	—	—	—	—	—	—		Well Kept Secret
1979	"Let's Keep It That Way"	37	—	—	37	—	—	—	—		—N/a
1979	"Lay Back in the Arms of Someone"	80	—	—	36	—	—	—	—		Take Heart
1979	"Any Way That You Want Me"	81	—	—	—	—	—	—	—		Take Heart
1979	"Until Tonight"	42	—	—	—	—	—	—	—		Take Heart
1980	"Sunshine"	35	—	—	—	—	—	—	—		Take Heart
1980	"You Fill My Life"	41	—	—	—	—	—	—	—		Take Heart
1981	"Angel of the Morning"^{[A]}	22	4	1	21	1	6	5	2	AUS: Gold; BPI: Silver; CAN: Gold; US: Gold	Juice
1981	"Queen of Hearts"	14	2	2	6	8	3	7	8	CAN: Platinum; US: Gold	Juice
1981	"The Sweetest Thing (I've Ever Known)"	1	7	1	1	25	1	—	—		Juice
1982	"Love's Been a Little Bit Hard on Me"	30	7	4	24	14	3	36	90		Quiet Lies
1982	"Break It to Me Gently"	2	11	1	2	—	1	—	—		Quiet Lies
1982	"Heart of the Night"	53	25	4	—	—	9	—	—		Quiet Lies
1983	"Tell Her No"	—	27	14	—	28	—	—	—		Dirty Looks
1983	"Dirty Looks"	—	90	—	—	—	—	—	—		Dirty Looks
1983	"Stranger at My Door"	45	—	—	—	—	—	—	—		Dirty Looks
1984	"A Little Love"	64	44	7	—	—		—	—		Can't Wait All Night
1984	"Ride 'Em Cowboy"	32	—	—	—	—	—	—	—		Greatest Hits
1984	"Can't Wait All Night"	—	66	—	—	85	16	—	—		Can't Wait All Night
1984	"Restless Heart"	57	—	—	34	—	—	—	—		Can't Wait All Night
1985	"You Make Me Want to Make You Mine"	1	—	—	1	—	—	—	—		Old Flame
1985	"Hurt"	1	—	—	1	—	—	—	—		Old Flame
1986	"Old Flame"	5	—	—	3	—	—	—	—		Old Flame
1986	"Both to Each Other (Friends and Lovers)"^{[B]} (with Eddie Rabbitt)	1	—	—	1	—	—	—	—		Old Flame
1986	"Cheap Love"	9	—	—	5	—	—	—	—		Old Flame
1986	"What Can I Do with My Heart"	9	—	—	7	—	—	—	—		Old Flame
1987	"First Time Caller"	24	—	—	23	—	—	—	—		Emotion
1987	"Tell Me True"	8	—	—	2	—	—	—	—		Emotion
1989	"When Love Comes Around the Bend"	40	—	—	—	—	—	—	—		Ain't Gonna Cry
1998	"When I Get Over You"	—	—	—	—	—	—	—	—		The Trouble with Angels
1999	"They Never Made It to Memphis"	—	—	—	—	—	—	—	—		American Girl
2010	"Funny How Time Slips Away" (with Willie Nelson)	—	—	—	—	—	—	—	—		Duets, Friends & Memories
"—" denotes releases that did not chart

== Tribute album appearances ==
Year	Album title	Song performed by Newton
1993	Edith Piaf Tribute	"Lovers of One Day"
1997	Bacharach ... Applause: The Look Of Love	"Always Something There To Remind Me"
2003	Sincerely II: Mariya Takeuchi Songbook	"Mersey Beat"
2005	An All Star Tribute to Cher	"Reason to Believe"
2005	An All Star Tribute To Shania Twain	"Come On Over"

== Videos ==
=== Video album ===
Title	Video details
Every Road Leads Back to You	Released: April 2, 2002; Studio: Image Entertainment; Format: DVD, VHS

=== Music videos ===
Year	Video	Director
1981	"Angel of the Morning"	
1981	"Queen of Hearts"	
1981	"The Sweetest Thing (I've Ever Known)"	
1982	"Love's Been a Little Bit Hard on Me"	
1982	"Break It to Me Gently"	
1982	"Heart of the Night"	
1984	"A Little Love"	
1984	"Can't Wait All Night"	
1985	"Hurt"	Oley Sassone

== Audiobooks ==
Title	Audiobook details	Stories read by Juice Newton
More American West in Fiction	Released: May 1997; Label: Audio Literature; Format: Cassette	"Salomy Jane's Kiss" by Bret Harte; "Candles in the Bottom of the Pool" by Max Evans
The Greatest Western Stories of the 20th Century	Released: December 16, 1999; Label: Phoenix Audio; Format: Audiobook	"Sweet Cactus Wine" by Marcia Muller

== Backing or harmony vocalist ==
Year	Title	Artist	Song(s)	Ref
1977	French Kiss	Bob Welch	"Ebony Eyes"	
2013	Have Harmony, Will Travel	Carla Olson	"You Can Come Cryin' To Me" "Stringin' Me On"	

== Notes ==
- A "Angel of the Morning" also peaked at number 57 on the U.S. Hot Mainstream Rock Tracks chart and number 43 on the UK Singles Chart.
- B "Both to Each Other (Friends and Lovers)" is only available on the 1986 re-issue of Old Flame.
