= Emotions (Juice Newton album) =

Compilation album by Juice Newton
- Released: February 7, 1994
- Genres: Country pop; adult contemporary
- Length: 1:13:44
- Labels: RCA; Pair

Juice Newton chronology
Ain't Gonna Cry (1989)	Emotions (1994)	Anthology (1998)

Emotions is a compilation album by American country pop singer Juice Newton. It was compiled by Pair Records in 1994 and consists of 20 tracks taken from five of the six albums Newton recorded for RCA Records.

== Overview ==
Juice Newton began her recording career with RCA Records in 1975 as the lead singer and a guitar player for the band Juice Newton & Silver Spur. Her two albums with the label – Juice Newton & Silver Spur and After the Dust Settles – met with little success and the label dropped her band. Newton then moved to Capitol Records and eventually made her "breakthrough" in 1981 with Juice, an album that reach number 22 on the Billboard 200 chart and number 16 on the Canadian Top 50 album chart. The album gave Newton three hit singles, beginning with "Angel of the Morning" which peaked at number four on the pop charts and number 22 on the country charts. Her second single from the album, "Queen of Hearts", reached number 2 on the Billboard Hot 100 and number 14 on the country charts. The final single from Juice, "The Sweetest Thing (I've Ever Known)", peaked at number one on the country chart and number seven on the pop chart.

Newton followed up Juice with Quiet Lies (1982), another hit album that reached number 20 on the Billboard 200. This album also had three hit singles released from its track lineup. The first, "Love's Been a Little Bit Hard on Me", reached #7 on the Billboard pop chart, #30 on the country chart, and #4 on the AC chart. The second, "Break It to Me Gently", hit the pop chart at #11, AC #1, and the country chart at #2. It also won her the Grammy Award for Best Country Vocal Performance, Female. The final single from Quiet Lies was "Heart of the Night". It reached #4 on the Billboard Adult Contemporary Chart and #25 on the Hot 100.

Newton's next album, Dirty Looks (1983), was not as successful as Juice and Quiet Lies. However, it sold well enough in Canada to be certified Gold on October 1, 1983, by the Canadian Music Industry. The three singles released from this album were "Tell Her No", "Dirty Looks", and "Stranger at My Door". The first two peaked on the pop chart at, respectively, #27 and #90. The third peaked on the country chart at #45.

In 1984 Newton returned to RCA and moved more into country music with the release of Can't Wait All Night. Her next album, Old Flame, peaked at number 12 on the Billboard album chart. "You Make Me Want to Make You Mine" was the album's lead-off single and went to number one on the Billboard Country chart. It was also her first top ten hit in three years. This was followed by "Hurt" which also went to number one on Billboard's chart. "Old Flame" and "Cheap Love", the next two singles to be released, peaked at number five and number nine, respectively. "What Can I Do with My Heart", the album's final single release was written by Newton's long-time collaborator Otha Young and also peaked at number nine. "Both to Each Other (Friends & Lovers)", a duet by Newton and Eddie Rabbitt, was released as a single in July 1985 and peaked at number one. This song was not included in the original release of Old Flame but was added to CD reissues.

Emotion (1987) was the last of Newton's albums to appear on Billboard's Top Country album chart and peaked at number 59. The album had two single releases. "First Time Caller" peaked at number 24 on Billboard's Hot Country Songs chart while "Tell Me True" peaked at number 8 on the same chart. Also featured on the album are "Emotions" and "'Til You Cry". After one more album, Ain't Gonna Cry (1989), Newton abandoned recording and concentrated on raising her children and performing in nightclubs.

== Pair Records compilation ==
Emotions was released on February 7, 1994, by Pair Records, a budget label that specialized in compilations released as double albums with music licensed from various labels. For this CD Pair licensed 20 songs from five of Newton's RCA albums. Thus none of the hits from her Capitol releases are included. Two song's from her debut album, Juice Newton & Silver Spur (1975) are included along with three from her second release, After the Dust Settles. The largest number of songs came from Old Flame with a total of seven songs. Three songs were derived from Can't Wait All Night and four from the similar-named Emotion.

In his liner notes for Emotions music critic Rich Kienzel noted that:

In the early nineties, when many younger country artists like Mary-Chapin Carpenter have folk or rock roots, Newton was the first to emerge from such a background. Today, a new younger generation of country artists are treading musical ground Juice Newton help to break years ago.

== Track listing ==
No.	Title	Writer(s)	Original album	Length
1.	"You Make Me Want to Make You Mine"	Dave Loggins	Old Flame	4:06
2.	"Won't You Stay (Just a Little Bit Longer)?"	Otha Young	Juice Newton & Silver Spur	3:10
3.	"Slip Away"	William Armstrong, Wilbur Terrell, Marcus Daniel	After the Dust Settles	6:16
4.	"Stuck in the Middle with You"	Joe Egan, Gerry Rafferty	Old Flame	2:50
5.	"Can't Wait All Night"	Bryan Adams, Jim Vallance	Can't Wait All Night	4:01
6.	"'Til You Cry"	Rick Giles, Steve Bogard	Emotion	4:01
7.	"Emotions"	Mel Tillis, Ramsey Kearney	Emotion	3:13
8.	"A Little Love"	Todd Sharp, Danny Douma, Richard Feldman	Can't Wait All Night	3:54
9.	"Good Time to Say Goodbye"	Robbie Gillman, Juice Newton, Bernfield	After the Dust Settles	3:13
10.	"Both to Each Other (Friends & Lovers)" (duet with Eddie Rabbitt)	Paul Gordon, Jay Gruska	Old Flame	3:53
11.	"Hurt"	Jimmie Crane, Al Jacobs	Old Flame	3:42
12.	"Tell Me True"	Brent Maher, Paul Kennerley	Emotion	3:12
13.	"Old Flame"	Reed Nielsen	Old Flame	3:02
14.	"First Time Caller"	Reed Nielsen	Emotion	3:37
15.	"Sailor Song"	Otha Young	After the Dust Settles	4:37
16.	"Cheap Love"	Del Shannon	Old Flame	3:31
17.	"Easy Way Out"	Tom Kelly, Billy Steinberg	Can't Wait All Night	3:26
18.	"Roll On, Trucker" (duet with Otha Young)	Otha Young	Juice Newton & Silver Spur	2:35
19.	"Waiting for the Sun"	Otha Young, Tim James	Can't Wait All Night	3:46
20.	"Let Your Woman Take Care of You"	Don Cook	Old Flame	3:39
