= Anthology (Juice Newton album) =

1998 compilation album by Juice Newton

Compilation album by Juice Newton
- Released: October 13, 1998
- Recorded: 1975–1989
- Genre: Country pop
- Length: 1:07:34
- Label: Renaissance

Juice Newton chronology
Emotions (1994)	Anthology (1998)	The Trouble with Angels (1998)

Professional ratings
Review scores
Source	Rating
AllMusic	4.5/5 stars

Anthology is a compilation album by American country pop singer Juice Newton. It was originally released by Renaissance Records on October 13, 1998. The album covers her career from 1975 to 1989 and features 19 songs taken from her albums Juice Newton & Silver Spur, Juice, Quiet Lies, Can't Wait All Night, Old Flame, Emotion, and Ain't Gonna Cry. However, it includes the 1975 take of "The Sweetest Thing (I've Ever Known)" from the first RCA album, not the 1981 hit version from Juice.

== Overview ==
=== Early success ===
Juice Newton began her recording career in 1975 and made five albums over the next four years. Initially she recorded for RCA Records but after only two albums she moved to Capitol. During this time she had only moderate success. Her first charted song was a minor hit called "Love is a Word" from her debut album, Juice Newton & Silver Spur (1975).

Newton's "breakthrough" came in 1981 with Juice, an album that reach number 22 on the Billboard 200 chart and number 16 on the Canadian Top 50 album chart. Juice was certified by the Recording Industry Association of America (RIAA) as gold on August 13, 1981, and platinum on January 5, 1982. The album also gave Newton three hit singles, beginning with "Angel of the Morning". The song, written by Chip Taylor, had been a number eight hit for Merrilee Rush in 1968. Newton's version peaked at number four on the pop charts and number 22 on the country charts.

Her second single from the album, "Queen of Hearts", reached number 2 on the Billboard Hot 100 and number 14 on the country charts. It used a similar arrangement to Dave Edmunds's version of the song on his 1979 album Repeat When Necessary. "Angel of the Morning" and "Queen of Hearts" were certified Gold by the RIAA, respectively, on July 1 and September 2, 1981. The final single from Juice was "The Sweetest Thing (I've Ever Known)", a song written by Newton's long-time collaborator, Otha Young. It was her biggest hit to date, peaking at number one on the country chart and number seven the pop chart. Newton had recorded the song earlier on Juice Newton & Silver Spur.

Newton followed up Juice with Quiet Lies (1982), another hit album that reached number 20 on the Billboard 200. It was certified Gold by the RIAA on July 16, 1982. This album also had three singles released from its track line up. The first, "Love's Been a Little Bit Hard on Me", reached number 7 on the Billboard pop chart and number 30 on the Country chart. It brought Newton a Grammy nomination for Pop Female Vocalist. The second, "Break It to Me Gently", had been a hit for Brenda Lee in 1962 when it reached number 4 on the Billboard 100. Newton's version topped the pop chart at number 11 and the country chart at number 2. It also won her the Grammy Award for Best Country Vocal Performance, Female. The final single from Quiet Lies was "In the Heart of the Night". It reached number 4 on the Billboard Adult Contemporary Chart and number 25 on the Hot 100.

Newton's next album, Dirty Looks (1983), was not as successful as Juice and Quiet Lies. However, it sold well enough in Canada to be certified Gold on October 1, 1983, by the Canadian Music Industry. The three singles released from this album were "Tell Her No", "Dirty Looks", and "Stranger at My Door". The first two peaked on the pop chart at, respectively, numbers 27 and 90. The third peaked on the country chart at 45. "Tell Her No" was a reworking of The Zombies 1965 hit, which had reached number 6 on the Billboard Hot 100.

=== Move to country music ===
In 1984 Newton returned to RCA Records and began a transition from mainstream pop to country music. Her first album in this period was Can't Wait All Night, from which the title track reached number 66 on the Billboard Hot 100 Chart while "A Little Love" reached number 44.

Her next album, Old Flame (1985), was a major success and gave her two number one hits on the Billboard Hot Country Songs chart: "You Make Me Want to Make You Mine" and "Hurt". The latter song had originally been a hit for Roy Hamilton. His version peaked at number eight on the R&B Best Seller chart and spent a total of seven weeks on the chart. In 1961, Timi Yuro's version of the song reached number four on the Billboard Hot 100, while reaching No. 2 on Billboard's Easy Listening chart and No. 22 on the R&B chart. Two other songs from the Old Flame album, the title track and "Cheap Love", peaked at number five and number nine, respectively. "What Can I Do with My Heart", the album's final single release, also peaked at number nine. "Both to Each Other (Friends & Lovers)", a duet by Newton and Eddie Rabbitt, was released as a single in July 1985 and peaked at number one. This song was not included in the original release of Old Flame but was added to the vinyl, cassette, CD reissues.

Newton followed Old Flame with Emotion (1987). This album produced two hits: "First Time Caller" peaked at number 24 on Billboard's Hot Country Songs chart while "Tell Me True" peaked at number 8. Ain't Gonna Cry (1989), her final album for RCA, featured "When Love Comes Around The Bend", a modest hit that peaked at number 40 on the Billboard Hot Country Songs.

=== Reception ===
In his review of Anthology Hank Small stated:

The most comprehensive overview of Juice Newton's career to date, a well-assembled 19-track retrospective which includes all of the singer's biggest country-pop hits from 1976 (her first chart entry "Love Is a Word", recorded with Silver Spur) to 1989 ("When Love Comes Around the Bend", her final Top 40 single). In addition to Newton's four Nashville number ones – "The Sweetest Thing (I've Ever Known)", "You Make Me Want to Make You Mine", "Hurt" and the Eddie Rabbitt duet "Both to Each Other (Friends and Lovers)" – the disc also includes the pop smashes "Angel of the Morning" and "Queen of Hearts".

== Track listing ==
No.	Title	Writer(s)	Original album	Length
1.	"Angel of the Morning"	Chip Taylor	Juice	4:10
2.	"Queen of Hearts"	Hank DeVito	Juice	3:23
3.	"Love's Been a Little Bit Hard on Me"	Gary Burr	Quiet Lies	3:12
4.	"Break It to Me Gently"	Diane Lambert, Joe Seneca	Quiet Lies	4:00
5.	"Heart of the Night"	John Bettis, Michael Clark	Quiet Lies	4:06
6.	"The Sweetest Thing (I've Ever Known)"	Otha Young	Juice	3:33
7.	"Love Is a Word"	Otha Young	Juice Newton and Silver Spur	2:46
8.	"Can't Wait All Night"	Bryan Adams, Jim Vallance	Can't Wait All Night	4:01
9.	"A Little Love"	Todd Sharp, Danny Douma, Richard Feldman	Can't Wait All Night	3:54
10.	"You Make Me Want to Make You Mine"	Dave Loggins	Old Flame	4:08
11.	"Hurt"	Jimmie Crane, Al Jacobs	Old Flame	3:42
12.	"Old Flame"	Reed Nielsen	Old Flame	3:02
13.	"Cheap Love"	Del Shannon	Old Flame	3:31
14.	"What Can I Do with My Heart"	Otha Young	Old Flame	3:34
15.	"Both to Each Other (Friends & Lovers)" (duet with Eddie Rabbitt)	Paul Gordon, Jay Gruska	Old Flame	3:53
16.	"First Time Caller"	Reed Nielsen	Emotion	3:37
17.	"Tell Me True"	Paul Kennerley, Brent Maher	Emotion	3:12
18.	"When Love Comes Around the Bend"	Josh Leo, Pam Tillis, Mark Wright	Ain't Gonna Cry	2:24
19.	"Easy Way Out"	Tom Kelly, Billy Steinberg	Can't Wait All Night	3:26
