= The Ultimate Hits Collection (Juice Newton album) =

Compilation album by Juice Newton
- Released: July 26, 2011
- Genre: Country rock, country pop
- Length: 1:14:46 (original); 1:21:19 (ITunes edition)
- Label: Fuel Records

Juice Newton chronology
Duets: Friends & Memories (2010)	The Ultimate Hits Collection (2011)

Professional ratings
Review scores
Source	Rating
AllMusic	3/5 stars

The Ultimate Hits Collection is a compilation album by country pop singer Juice Newton. It was released by Fuel Records in 2011. All ten tracks from Newton's 1998 album The Trouble With Angels were included in this release (in remixed form) along with ten other recordings from various other Newton albums and one new track. An iTunes edition added two more tracks.

== Overview ==
=== Background ===
Juice Newton began her recording career in 1975 but did not achieve major stardom until the release of her 1981 album Juice. The album was a crossover success and yielded three hit singles, "Angel of the Morning", "Queen of Hearts", and "The Sweetest Thing (I've Ever Known)". The last of these peaked at number one on the Billboard Country Chart. She followed Juice with Quiet Lies (1982), an album that brought her two more hits, "Love's Been a Little Bit Hard on Me" and "Break It to Me Gently", of which the latter earned her the Grammy Award for Best Country Vocal Performance, Female. Newton's 1985 album Old Flame was her country breakthrough, spawning three number one hits "You Make Me Want to Make You Mine", "Hurt", and the duet with Eddie Rabbitt "Both to Each Other (Friends & Lovers)" and also three additional Top Ten hits: "Old Flame", "Cheap Love", and "What Can I Do with My Heart". After two more albums (Emotion and Ain't Gonna Cry) Newton concentrated more on concert performing.

Newton returned to recording in 1998 with her album The Trouble With Angels, a collection made up largely of new renditions of her previous hits. The following year she released American Girl. In the mid-1990s Newton began recording a series of duets. Initially these were conceived to be a double album that would be released via a television infomercial. However legal problems kept them from being officially issued for many years. What finally emerged was a single disc collection of 10 songs released in 2010 as Duets: Friends & Memories. In the meantime, Newton made a concert video, Every Road Leads Back to You, and a Christmas album, The Gift of Christmas.

=== Ultimate Hits ===
Juice Newton's The Ultimate Hits Collection was released as a budget-priced anthology by Fuel Records on July 7, 2011. For the album's content Fuel used all ten tracks from The Trouble With Angels thus rejecting many of Newton's actual hits by including later re-recordings in their place. Therefore, this collection does not contain any of the recordings from her "breakthrough" album Juice. The only vintage hit records included are "Hurt", "Tell Her No", "Heart of the Night", and "A Little Love" from, respectively, the Old Flame, Dirty Looks, Quiet Lies, and Can't Wait All Night albums. Four songs from American Girl along with a duet with Willie Nelson from Duets: Friends & Memories are also included. The only previously unreleased recording in the collection is "Sweet Sweet Smile", a song written by Newton with her long-time collaborator Otha Young that had been a minor hit for The Carpenters in 1978.

The Ultimate Hits Collection has been made available from iTunes with two extra songs taken from The Gift of Christmas.

== Track listing ==
No.	Title	Writer(s)	Original album	Length
1.	"Angel of the Morning"	Chip Taylor	The Trouble With Angels	4:16
2.	"Love's Been a Little Bit Hard on Me"	Gary Burr	The Trouble With Angels	3:11
3.	"Break It to Me Gently"	Diane Lambert, Joe Seneca	The Trouble With Angels	4:07
4.	"When I Get Over You"	Kipp Lennon, Mark Lennon, Michael Lennon, John Vester	The Trouble With Angels	3:51
5.	"This Old Flame"	Reed Nielsen	The Trouble With Angels	3:37
6.	"The Trouble With Angels"	Terry Wilson	The Trouble With Angels	4:00
7.	"Hurt"	Jimmie Crane, Al Jacobs	Old Flame	3:45
8.	"Ride 'Em Cowboy"	Paul Davis	The Trouble With Angels	4:10
9.	"Red Blooded American Girl"	Lawrence Gottlieb, Kevin Montgomery	The Trouble With Angels	5:03
10.	"Queen of Hearts"	Hank DeVito	The Trouble With Angels	3:29
11.	"The Sweetest Thing (I've Ever Known)"	Otha Young	The Trouble With Angels	4:15
12.	"Nightime Without You"	Juice Newton	American Girl	2:36
13.	"Ask Lucinda"	Johnny Pierce, Otha Young	American Girl	2:51
14.	"Love Hurts"	Boudleaux Bryant	American Girl	4:03
15.	"Tell Her No"	Rod Argent	Dirty Looks	3:34
16.	"Heart of the Night"	John Bettis, Michael Clark	Quiet Lies	4:09
17.	"Crazy Little Thing Called Love"	Freddie Mercury	American Girl	2:45
18.	"Funny How Time Slips Away" (with Willie Nelson)	Willie Nelson	Duets: Friends & Memories	3:34
19.	"A Little Love"	Todd Sharp, Danny Douma, Richard Feldman	Can't Wait All Night	3:57
20.	"Go Tell It on the Mountain" (only in ITunes edition)	John Wesley Work Jr.	The Gift of Christmas	3:19
21.	"Jingle Bell Rock" (only in ITunes edition)	Joseph Carleton Beal, James Ross Boothe	The Gift of Christmas	3:14
22.	"Sweet Sweet Smile" (track 20 on CD release)	Juice Newton, Otha Young	previously unissued	3:33
