= Every Road Leads Back to You =

Live album by Juice Newton
- Released: April 2, 2002
- Recorded: September 10, 2001 (concert)
- Venue: Key Club, Los Angeles, California
- Genre: rock, country rock, country pop, swing
- Length: 1:33:43
- Label: Image
- Producer: Charles Calello

Juice Newton chronology
American Girl (1999)	Every Road Leads Back to You (2002)	Country Classics (2002)

Every Road Leads Back to You is a live album and concert video by country pop singer Juice Newton. It was released as both a DVD and two-disc CD by Image Entertainment in 2002. The concert consists of Newton and her band performing many of her hits along with new songs. As a bonus four new studio recordings are included on the second disc of the CD release. The DVD contains these songs as audio-only tracks and also includes some interviews with Newton and her band members.

== Overview ==
=== Background ===
Juice Newton began her recording career in 1975 but did not achieve major stardom until the release of her 1981 album Juice. The album was a crossover success and yielded three hit singles, "Angel of the Morning", "Queen of Hearts", and "The Sweetest Thing (I've Ever Known)". The last of these peaked at number one on the Billboard Country Chart. She followed Juice with Quiet Lies (1982), an album that brought her two more hits, "Love's Been a Little Bit Hard on Me" and "Break It to Me Gently", of which the latter earned her the Grammy Award for Best Country Vocal Performance, Female. Newton's 1985 album Old Flame was her country breakthrough, spawning three number one hits "You Make Me Want to Make You Mine", "Hurt", and the duet with Eddie Rabbitt "Both to Each Other (Friends & Lovers)" and also three additional Top Ten hits: "Old Flame", "Cheap Love", and "What Can I Do with My Heart". After two more albums (Emotion and Ain't Gonna Cry) Newton concentrated more on concert performing.

Newton returned to recording in 1997 with The Trouble With Angels, an album made up largely of re-recordings of her earlier hits. She followed two years later with American Girl, which consisted of new material. Of the latter music critic Charlotte Dillon stated "Newton's husky voice puts an original touch to each tune, sure to please both new and old fans. An album worth having."

=== The Concert ===
The concert that appears in Every Road Leads Back to You was performed at the Key Club on the Sunset Strip in Los Angeles, California, on September 10, 2001 (one day before terrorist attacks in New York City). During the concert Newton and her band performed 21 songs with five included in two medleys. Five songs originated from her Juice album ("Shot Full of Love", "Ride 'Em Cowboy", "The Sweetest Thing (I've Ever Known)", "Angel of the Morning", and "Queen of Hearts") while three were taken from Quiet Lies ("Love's Been a Little Hard On Me", "Break It To Me Gently" and "Love Sail Away"). From the Old Flame album came four songs ("This Old Flame", "You Make Me Want To Make You Mine", "Cheap Love", and "Hurt"). Two songs were taken from The Trouble With Angels (the title track and "Red Blooded American Girl") while another two derived from American Girl ("Night Time Without You" and "They Never Made It To Memphis").

The concert also presented four new songs previously unrecorded by Newton. "Your Heart Is Showing" was presented as the opening number while the title track, "Every Road Leads Back to You", and "Love Is Still Alive and Well" were presented in the concert and also as a bonus studio tracks. The concert's closing track "It's Late" was performed as an a cappella encore.

=== The DVD ===
The DVD of Every Road Leads Back to You was released by Image Entertainment in 2002. The concert is presented in 18 tracks with the first listed as "Opening" and the last as "End Credits". The 16 tracks in between form the body of the concert. The bonus material included in the DVD consists of four interview segments ("Growing Up", "On the Road", "Song Writing", and "Influences and Excitement") and four audio only studio tracks ("Love Is Still Alive and Well", "If I Could I Would", "Every Road Leads Back To You", and "Your Heart Is Showing"). "Love Is Still Alive and Well" is also presented in video form as a concert outtake.

== Critical reception ==
In his review of the CD release of the album music critic Gregory McIntosh stated:

Every Road Leads Back to You marks another yet another collection wrapped around the '80s hits of Juice Newton, but these versions are re-recorded and a few of her biggest hits are presented here as sections of a pair of medleys instead of being self-contained. This makes Every Road Leads Back to You an interesting study for those who already have the original hit recordings, but not a necessity since the performances lack any sort of convincing deviation from the originals nor are they quite as spirited. Many other collections have been offered up of higher quality, most notably Juice Newton's Greatest Hits (And More) issued by Capitol, which has been the benchmark of Newton anthologies for several years running.

However the reviewer for DVDnet was more positive about the album and DVD by stating:

Juice Newton – Every Road Leads Back To You is a concert performance by a very talented artist in her prime. Covering an array of songs from her many albums and featuring a selection from her new release of the same name as this disc, she ably demonstrates her obvious talent as a singer. Like most people unfamiliar with the music of Juice Newton, I was fully expecting a non-stop show of country and western tracks. Yes, there are a number of country tunes, but there are also songs that show her obvious influences from folk and rhythm and blues music.

== CD Track listing ==
Disc one: live album
No.	Title	Writer(s)	Length
1.	"Your Heart Is Showing"	Sandy Linzer, David Wolfert	4:18
2.	"Love Sail Away"	Otha Young	4:27
3.	"Hurt" / "Break It to Me Gently" (medley)	Jimmie Crane, Al Jacobs / Joe Seneca, Diane Lambert	5:02
4.	"The Trouble With Angels"	Terry Wilson	4:07
5.	"Red Blooded American Girl"	Lawrence Gottlieb, Kevin Montgomery	5:02
6.	"You Make Me Want To Make You Mine" / "Cheap Love" / "Love's Been a Little Hard On Me" (medley)	Dave Loggins / Del Shannon / Gary Burr	7:47
7.	"Every Road Leads Back To You"	Sandy Linzer, David Wolfert	3:47
8.	"Shot Full of Love"	Bob McDill	4:31
9.	"Ride 'Em Cowboy"	Paul Davis	3:44
10.	"This Old Flame"	Reed Nielsen	3:55
11.	"The Sweetest Thing (I've Ever Known)"	Otha Young	4:48
12.	"Night Time Without You"	Juice Newton	4:31
13.	"They Never Made It to Memphis"	Jan Buckingham, Karen Staley	3:12
14.	"Angel of the Morning"	Chip Taylor	5:54
15.	"Queen of Hearts"	Hank De Vito	3:53
16.	"Every Road Leads Back to Back to You"	Sandy Linzer, David Wolfert	3:08
17.	"It's Late"	Dorsey Burnette	1:35
18.	"Love Is Still Alive and Well"	Sandy Linzer, David Wolfert	4:16
Total length:			1:17:57

Disc two: studio bonus tracks
No.	Title	Writer(s)	Length
1.	"Love Is Still Alive and Well"	Sandy Linzer, David Wolfert	3:42
2.	"If I Could"	Sandy Linzer, Paul Umbach	4:27
3.	"Every Road Leads Back To You"	Sandy Linzer, David Wolfert	3:37
4.	"Your Heart Is Showing"	Sandy Linzer, David Wolfert	4:00
Total length:			15:46

== Personnel ==
Band

- Juice Newton – vocals, acoustic guitar, percussion,
- Otha Young – acoustic & electric guitar, vocals
- Jay Cawley – bass, vocals
- Steve Cochran – electric guitar, vocals
- André Mayeux – engineer, keyboards
- Rick Shlosser – drums

Horn section

- Bob McChesney – trombone
- Rob Lockhart – saxophone
- Howie Shear – trumpet
- Kasper Skinsness – trumpet
