= Duets: Friends & Memories =

Studio album by Juice Newton
- Released: October 4, 2010
- Genre: Country rock
- Length: 40:29 (original); 48:17 (deluxe edition)
- Label: Fuel Records
- Producer: Charles Calello

Juice Newton chronology
| The Gift of Christmas (2007) | Duets: Friends & Memories (2010) | The Ultimate Hits Collection (2011) |

Duets: Friends & Memories is a studio album by American country pop singer Juice Newton. It was released in 2010 by Fuel Records and features Newton singing popular tunes from the 1960s to the 1980s, all as duets with other famous performers. Her collaborators include Gary Morris, Frankie Valli, Randy Meisner, Willie Nelson, Glen Campbell, Dan Seals, Melissa Manchester, and Eddie Money. The original CD release of the album contained 10 songs. A later edition featuring two extra tracks is available only from iTunes.

== Overview ==
Juice Newton began her recording career in 1975 but did not achieve major stardom until the release of her 1981 album Juice. The album was a crossover success and yielded three hit singles, "Angel of the Morning", "Queen of Hearts", and "The Sweetest Thing (I've Ever Known)". The last of these peaked at number one on the Billboard Country Chart. She followed Juice with Quiet Lies (1982), an album that brought her two more hits, "Love's Been a Little Bit Hard on Me" and "Break It to Me Gently", of which the latter earned her the Grammy Award for Best Country Vocal Performance, Female. Newton's 1985 album Old Flame was her country breakthrough, spawning three number one hits "You Make Me Want to Make You Mine", "Hurt", and the duet with Eddie Rabbitt "Both to Each Other (Friends & Lovers)" and also three additional Top Ten hits: "Old Flame", "Cheap Love", and "What Can I Do with My Heart". After two more albums (Emotion and Ain't Gonna Cry) Newton concentrated more on concert performing.

Newton began the duets project in the mid-1990s. Initially, it was conceived as a double album to be released via a television infomercial. However, legal problems kept it from being officially issued. Regarding the album, Newton stated:

I started in pop, then crossed over into country. And I actually do some swing music, so that was the first idea. The second ruling factor was when I went to these artists, I asked them if there were songs they liked that they had not had a chance to record. So that was interesting, to let the individual artist pick the song, almost like they do on their record. For me it was like making three records. These singers are so wonderful and unique — I really wanted to be on my game. I lived with my headphones on, studying the songs and preparing my interpretations."

The recording of the album used various studios throughout the United States. Newton recorded her duets with Glen Campbell, Randy Meisner, and Dan Seals at Loud Recording in Nashville, Tennessee. Her songs with Melissa Manchester and Frankie Valli were done at the Saturn Recording Studio in Burbank, California, while Manchester and Valli also recorded at another Burbank studio, O'Henry Sound. Willie Nelson recorded at the Predermails Recording Studios in Spicewood, Texas. The rhythm section and the strings were recorded in Nashville while the horns were done in North Hollywood, California. On working with these artists Newton noted that Valli and Seals were the most difficult because they had to change the key every time the switch was made from male to female parts. She went on to note: "That is a mental challenge, because you have to listen carefully in order to modulate up or down. All the time I was singing with the guys it was more challenging for me". Sadly, Dan Seals and Newton's long-time collaborator Otha Young died before the album was released. Regarding Seals, Newton remarked: "I always admired his vocal style. Dan was such a sweet singer, and always so fun to be around. He was such an easy person, with such a great voice. I was really happy to be able to sing with him before he passed."

Duets: Friends & Memories was released by Fuel Records on October 4, 2010. Of the ten songs on the album Newton duets with Willie Nelson on two songs that he wrote, "Touch Me" and "Funny How Time Slips Away". The former had been a hit for Nelson in 1962, reaching number 7 on the Billboard Hot Country Songs chart. The latter was originally recorded by country singer Billy Walker. For the album's opening number Newton teamed with country music singer Gary Morris for "Still the One", the 1976 top five hit for Orleans. Newton remarked about working with Nelson and Morris by stating: "With Willie, he likes to play his guitar while he sings. He plays it on his fret board, so that was a challenge. With Gary, we pitched the song in the wrong key, so we had to tighten our shorts to do that one."

Newton recorded two songs with Glen Campbell. The emotional power ballad "Without You" had originally been recorded by Badfinger before becoming a four week #1 hit for Harry Nilsson in 1972. "Up Where We Belong" had been a 1982 chart-topping hit for Joe Cocker and Jennifer Warnes, for the movie An Officer and a Gentleman.

Newton duets with Frankie Valli on "The Biggest Part of Me", a number 3 hit for Ambrosia in 1980. With Randy Meisner she covered The Eagles' 1976 hit "Take It to the Limit". Gary Morris joined Newton for a rendition of the 1976 Elvin Bishop song "Fooled Around and Fell in Love" while Dan Seals joined her for a reworking of Heart's first #1 hit, 1986's "These Dreams". Newton's duet with Melissa Manchester was "You've Lost That Lovin' Feelin'", the classic song written by Phil Spector, Barry Mann, and Cynthia Weil that became a number one hit for the Righteous Brothers in 1965, and has since been covered by many artists.

Following its CD release, Duets: Friends and Memories was made available on iTunes in its original 10-track edition and also in a "deluxe edition" that includes two extra songs. One of these features Newton again with Randy Meisner, these time in a performance of Neil Young's 1971 number one hit "Heart of Gold". The other extra song was with Eddie Money dueting on "Time After Time", Cyndi Lauper's number one hit from 1984.

Newton remarked about the album that:

It was just a lot of fun to work with the different people and make everyone comfortable. One of the times I couldn’t find the studio and I didn’t have GPS in my car, so I was trying to find it on my own. All kinds of stuff like that happened, but we got it done! At first you might go "Oh, wow," because you aren’t sure you can sing the song they picked, and then you just look at each other and say, "Oh, yeah." You just have to cowboy up and make it right.

In his review of the album music critic David Bowling stated:

Juice Newton may be far removed from her seventies and eighties hit days but she has continued to release well conceived and executed albums. It’s nice these duets have finally seen the light of day and hopefully more will be released in the future.

== Track listing ==
| No. | Title | Writer(s) | Duet with | Length |
|---|---|---|---|---|
| 1. | "Still the One" | Johanna Hall, John Hall | Gary Morris | 3:52 |
| 2. | "The Biggest Part of Me" | David Pack | Frankie Valli | 4:58 |
| 3. | "Take It to the Limit" | Randy Meisner, Don Henley and Glenn Frey | Randy Meisner | 4:19 |
| 4. | "Touch Me" | Willie Nelson | Willie Nelson | 3:15 |
| 5. | "Without You" | Pete Ham, Tom Evans | Glen Campbell | 3:55 |
| 6. | "Fooled Around and Fell in Love" | Elvin Bishop | Gary Morris | 4:01 |
| 7. | "These Dreams" | Martin Page, Bernie Taupin | Dan Seals | 4:30 |
| 8. | "Up Where We Belong" | Jack Nitzsche, Buffy Sainte-Marie, Will Jennings | Glen Campbell | 3:58 |
| 9. | "You've Lost That Lovin' Feelin'" | Phil Spector, Barry Mann, Cynthia Weil | Melissa Manchester | 4:09 |
| 10. | "Funny How Time Slips Away" | Willie Nelson | Willie Nelson | 3:32 |
| 11. | "Time After Time" (only in deluxe edition from iTunes) | Cyndi Lauper, Rob Hyman | Eddie Money | 4:12 |
| 12. | "Heart of Gold" (only in deluxe edition from iTunes) | Neil Young | Randy Meisner | 3:36 |

== Personnel ==
- Juice Newton – primary artist, background vocals
- Glen Campbell, Melissa Manchester, Randy Meisner, Eddie Money, Gary Morris, Gary Morris, Willie Nelson, Dan Seals, Frankie Valli – duet, featured artists
- Charles Calello – arranger, concept, conductor, horn arrangements, producer, rhythm arrangements, string arrangements
- Jerry Hey – arranger, trumpet
- Glenn Worf – electric bass
- Eddie Bayers – drums
- Larry Byrom – acoustic guitar
- Dann Huff – electric guitar, soloist
- Terry McMillan – harmonica, percussion
- John Hobbs – keyboards
- Paul Franklin – pedal steel
- Mike Fisher – percussion
- Brandon Fields, Dan Higgins, Kim Hutchcroft, Larry Williams – reeds
- Bob Bullock – rhythm engineer
- Kevin Beamish – string engineer
- David Angell, Monisa Angell, John Catchings, Bruce Christensen, David Davidson, Conni Ellisor, Mary Furth, Richard Grosjean, Idalynn Jacobs, Anthony LaMarchina, Lee Larrison, Theodore Madsen, Robert Mason, Cate Myer, Randall Olson, Lynn Peithman, Kathryn Plummer, Pamela Sixfin, Julia Tanner, Bobby Taylor, Alan Umstead, Catherine Ustead, Mary Kathryn Van Osdale, Gary Van Osdale, Kristin Wilkinson – strings
- Lew McCreary, Richard Taylor "Dick" Nash, William Frank "Bill" Reichenbach Jr. – trombone
- Gary Grant, Larry Hall – trumpet
- Michael Black, Jana King, Usa Silver, Dennis Wilson, Curtis Young, Otha Young – background vocals
