= The Trouble with Angels (Juice Newton album) =

Studio album by Juice Newton
- Released: April 28, 1998
- Genre: Country rock
- Length: 39:59
- Label: River North
- Producer: Richard Landis

Juice Newton chronology
Anthology (1998)	The Trouble with Angels (1998)	American Girl (1999)

Singles from The Trouble with Angels
- 1. "When I Get Over You" Released: March 31, 1998

Professional ratings
Review scores
Source	Rating
AllMusic	2.5/5 stars

The Trouble with Angels is the tenth solo studio album by American country pop singer Juice Newton. It was released by River North Records in 1998. Newton's previous studio album had been Ain't Gonna Cry (1989). After the release of that album she spent several years performing on concert tours and in night clubs. The Trouble With Angels marked her return to studio recording after nine years.

== Overview ==
Juice Newton began her recording career in 1975 but did not achieve major stardom until the release of her 1981 album Juice. The album was a crossover success and yielded three hit singles, "Angel of the Morning", "Queen of Hearts", and "The Sweetest Thing (I've Ever Known)". The last of these peaked at number one on the Billboard Country Chart. She followed Juice with Quiet Lies (1982), an album that brought her two more hits, "Love's Been a Little Bit Hard on Me" and "Break It to Me Gently", of which the latter earned her the Grammy Award for Best Country Vocal Performance, Female. Newton's 1985 album Old Flame was her country breakthrough, spawning three number one hits "You Make Me Want to Make You Mine", "Hurt", and the duet with Eddie Rabbitt "Both to Each Other (Friends & Lovers)" and also three additional Top Ten hits: "Old Flame", "Cheap Love", and "What Can I Do with My Heart". After two more albums (Emotion and Ain't Gonna Cry) Newton concentrated more on concert performing.

In 1998, after an absence of nine years Newton re-united with Richard Landis, the producer of her earlier hits. The album that emerged, The Trouble With Angels, came together in a mere three weeks and was recorded over a period of only four days. According to Landis, "There were no glitches. Juice was a gem to work with, very prepared and professional. She recorded differently this time. We used to do more stop and start with her vocals. This was a much more straight-through performance. We made a conscious decision to approach it more organically." The album, however, was not a full-fledged comeback, as Newton chose to make new recordings of seven of her earlier hits: "Angel of the Morning", "Ride 'Em Cowboy", "Love's Been a Little Bit Hard on Me", "This Old Flame", "Break It to Me Gently", "Queen of Hearts", and "The Sweetest Thing (I've Ever Known)". Some of these contained alternate phrasing and different arrangements. Regarding these alterations Newton stated, "I was very aware that you can't recreate the past, and frankly, we had no desire to make a carbon copy. The core of what a writer is still is there, but there's always a different interpretation."

The album's three remaining songs – "When I Get Over You", "The Trouble With Angels", and "Red Blooded American Girl" – were new to Newton's repertoire. "When I Get Over You" was chosen as the album's first single. It had been recorded by the band Venice on their 1997 album Born and Raised. After Newton heard it she bought Venice's album and brought the song to her producer, Richard Landis. Speaking of the album's title track, Newton remarked, "I loved the line 'We've got pseudo big plans.' Sometimes if you've got these grandiose plans, you feel too greedy. I sat there and immediately thought, 'Oh, wow, I've got to hear that again.'"

In his review of The Trouble With Angels music critic Stephen Thomas Erlewine lamented the reworking of earlier hits but still had some praise for the album: "Presumably, this course was taken with the idea that it would remind audiences of why Newton was a star, but the lack of new material is nevertheless quite disappointing for longtime fans. That said, she's in fine voice on the record, and the album is hardly bad."

In 2011, all tracks from The Trouble With Angels were included (in remixed form) on a compilation album called The Ultimate Hits Collection.

== Track listing ==
No.	Title	Writer(s)	Length
1.	"Angel of the Morning"	Chip Taylor	4:16
2.	"Ride 'Em Cowboy"	Paul Davis	4:10
3.	"Love's Been a Little Bit Hard on Me"	Gary Burr	3:11
4.	"When I Get over You"	Kipp Lennon, Mark Lennon, Michael Lennon, John Vester	3:51
5.	"The Trouble with Angels"	Terry Wilson	4:00
6.	"This Old Flame"	Reed Nielsen	3:37
7.	"Break It to Me Gently"	Diane Lambert, Joe Seneca	4:07
8.	"Red Blooded American Girl"	Lawrence Gottlieb, Kevin Montgomery	5:03
9.	"Queen of Hearts"	Hank DeVito	3:29
10.	"The Sweetest Thing (I've Ever Known)"	Otha Young	4:15

== Personnel ==
- Juice Newton − primary artist, clapping, background vocals
- Eddie Bayers − drums
- Spady Brannan − bass
- Aubrey Haynie − fiddle, guest artist, mandolin
- David Hungate − bass
- Michael Johnson − dobro, steel guitar
- Jeff King − acoustic & electric guitar
- Richard Landis − bells, clapping, orchestra bells, producer, snaps, tambourine
- B. James Lowry − acoustic guitar
- Kerry Marx − electric guitar
- Terry McMillan − castanets, guest artist, harmonica, percussion, tambourine
- Jimmy Nichols − keyboards, organ, piano, synthesizer
- Christopher Penn − clapping
- John Wesley Riles − background vocals
- Milton Sledge − drums
- Harry Stinson − drums
- Dennis Wilson − background vocals
- Curtis Young − background vocals
