= Greatest Hits (Juice Newton album) =

Greatest hits album by Juice Newton
- Released: 1985
- Recorded: 1975–1983
- Genre: Country pop
- Length: 37:08 (original); 53:39 (reissue)
- Label: Capitol
- Producer: Elliot Mazer

Juice Newton chronology
Dirty Looks (1983)	Greatest Hits (1985)	Can't Wait All Night (1984)

Alternative cover
- Cover of the expanded reissue

Singles from Greatest Hits
- 1. "Ride 'Em, Cowboy" Released: 1984

Professional ratings
Review scores
Source	Rating
AllMusic	4.5/5 stars

Greatest Hits is the ninth album and first greatest hits collection by American country pop singer Juice Newton. It was originally released by Capitol Records in 1984 with ten tracks taken from her albums Juice, Quiet Lies, and Dirty Looks. It was reissued in 1986 in an expanded 15-track edition titled Juice Newton's Greatest Hits (and more). The album became a best seller and has been certified gold by the Recording Industry Association of America.

== Overview ==
=== Juice ===
Juice Newton began her recording career in 1975 and made five albums over the next four years without achieving any major success. Her breakthrough came in 1981 with Juice, an album that reached number 22 on the Billboard 200 chart and number 16 on the Canadian Top 50 album chart. Juice was certified by the Recording Industry Association of America (RIAA) as gold on August 13, 1981 and platinum on January 5, 1982. The album also gave Newton three hit singles, beginning with "Angel of the Morning". The song, written by Chip Taylor, had been a number seven hit for Merrilee Rush in 1968. Newton's version peaked at number four on the pop charts and number 22 on the country charts.

Her second single from the album, "Queen of Hearts", reached number 2 on the Billboard Hot 100 and number 14 on the country charts. It used the same arrangement that Dave Edmunds used on his version of the song on his 1979 album Repeat When Necessary. "Angel of the Morning" and "Queen of Hearts" were certified Gold by the RIAA, respectively, on July 1 and September 2, 1981. The final single from Juice was "The Sweetest Thing (I've Ever Known)", a song written by Newton's long-time collaborator, Otha Young. It was her biggest hit to date, peaking at number one on the country chart and number seven the pop chart. Newton had recorded the song earlier on her debut album Juice Newton & Silver Spur (1975).

=== Quiet Lies and Dirty Looks ===
Newton followed up Juice with Quiet Lies (1982), another hit album that reached number 20 on the Billboard 200. It was certified Gold by the RIAA on July 16, 1982. This album also had three singles released from its track line up. The first hit, "Love's Been a Little Bit Hard on Me", reached number 7 on the Billboard pop chart, number 30 on the Country chart, and number 2 on the Adult Contemporary chart. It brought Newton a Grammy nomination for Pop Female Vocalist. The second, "Break It to Me Gently", had been a hit for Brenda Lee in 1962 when it reached number 4 on the Billboard 100. Newton's version reached number 11 on the pop chart and number 2 on the country chart. It also won her the Grammy Award for Best Country Vocal Performance, Female. The final single from Quiet Lies was "In the Heart of the Night". It reached number 4 on the Billboard Adult Contemporary Chart and number 25 on the Hot 100.

Newton's next album, Dirty Looks (1983), was not as successful as Juice and Quiet Lies. However, it sold well enough in Canada to be certified Gold on October 1, 1983, by the Canadian Music Industry. The three singles released from this album were "Tell Her No", "Dirty Looks", and "Stranger at My Door". The first two peaked on the pop chart at, respectively, numbers 27 and 90. The third peaked on the country chart at 45. "Tell Her No" was a reworking of The Zombies 1965 hit, which had reached number 6 on the Billboard Hot 100.

=== Compiling Greatest Hits ===
Juice Newton's Greatest Hits album was originally released by Capitol Records in 1984. Five of the ten tracks that appeared on the album were from Juice. These were the three singles, "Angel of the Morning", "Queen of Hearts", and "The Sweetest Thing", plus two album tracks, "Ride 'Em, Cowboy" and "Shot Full of Love". Four tracks from Quiet Lies were included, consisting of its three singles, "Love's Been a Little Bit Hard on Me", "Break it to Me Gently" and "Heart of the Night", plus an album track, "I'm Gonna Be Strong". Only "Tell Her No" was taken from Dirty Looks. "I'm Gonna Be Strong" was written by Barry Mann and Cynthia Weil and had been a top ten hit for Gene Pitney in 1965. "Ride 'Em, Cowboy" was released as a single from Greatest Hits and reached number 32 on the Billboard Hot Country Songs chart.

On November 14, 1986, Capitol reissue Newton's Greatest Hits in an expanded 15-track edition titled Juice Newton's Greatest Hits (and more). This version retained nine of the album's original tracks. "Ride 'Em, Cowboy" was dropped and six new tracks were brought in. The title track from Dirty Looks was among these along with five songs from her pre-Juice recordings. "Low Down and Lonesome" derived from Newton's 1977 Come to Me album while "So Many Ways" and "Hey! Baby" came from her 1978 release Well Kept Secret. The last of these was a cover version of Bruce Channel's 1962 number one hit. "Lay Back in the Arms of Someone", taken from Newton's Take Heart 1979 album, was originally recorded by the British band Smokie. "It's a Heartache" was included in only foreign issues of Newton's Come to Me album but not in the American and British editions. Released as a one-off single in 1978, Newton's rendition of this song was a major hit in Mexico. In the United States it peaked at only number 86 and was eclipsed by Bonnie Tyler's version of the song which shot up to number 3 on the Billboard Hot 100.

== Charts ==
Chart (1984)	Position
United States (Billboard 200)	178
Australia (Kent Music Report)	69

== Certifications and critical reception ==
Greatest Hits (and More) was certified Gold by the RIAA on June 21, 1991. In his review of the album, music critic Greg Adams noted that "the hits are the highlights here...Greatest Hits (and More) makes for enjoyable listening, and provides an excellent and concise overview of Newton's early-'80s output."

== Track listing ==
=== Original release: Greatest Hits ===
Side one
No.	Title	Writer(s)	Original album	Length
1.	"Angel of the Morning"	Chip Taylor	Juice	4:10
2.	"Love's Been a Little Bit Hard on Me"	Gary Burr	Quiet Lies	3:14
3.	"Heart of the Night"	John Bettis, Michael Clark	Quiet Lies	4:09
4.	"Ride 'Em Cowboy"	Paul Davis	Juice	3:29
5.	"The Sweetest Thing (I've Ever Known)"	Otha Young	Juice	4:06

Side two
No.	Title	Writer(s)	Original album	Length
1.	"Queen of Hearts"	Hank DeVito	Juice	3:24
2.	"Break It to Me Gently"	Joe Seneca, Diane Lambert	Quiet Lies	4:04
3.	"I'm Gonna Be Strong"	Barry Mann, Cynthia Weil	Quiet Lies	3:36
4.	"Shot Full of Love"	Bob McDill	Juice	3:22
5.	"Tell Her No"	Rod Argent	Dirty Looks	3:34

=== Reissue: Juice Newton's Greatest Hits (and more) ===
No.	Title	Writer(s)	Original album	Length
1.	"Angel of the Morning"	Chip Taylor	Juice	4:14
2.	"Heart of the Night"	John Bettis / Michael Clark	Quiet Lies	4:08
3.	"Love's Been a Little Bit Hard on Me"	Gary Burr	Quiet Lies	3:15
4.	"Break It to Me Gently"	Diane Lambert / Joe Seneca	Quiet Lies	4:03
5.	"Low Down and Lonesome"	Robbie Gillman / Juice Newton / Otha Young	Come to Me	2:52
6.	"The Sweetest Thing (I've Ever Known)"	Otha Young	Juice	4:08
7.	"So Many Ways"	Curtis Stone	Well Kept Secret	2:56
8.	"Queen of Hearts"	Hank DeVito	Juice	3:26
9.	"Lay Back in the Arms of Someone"	Mike Chapman / Nicky Chinn	Take Heart	3:32
10.	"Hey! Baby"	Bruce Channel / Margaret Cobb	Well Kept Secret	3:09
11.	"Shot Full of Love"	Bob McDill	Juice	3:23
12.	"I'm Gonna Be Strong"	Barry Mann / Cynthia Weil	Quiet Lies	3:39
13.	"It's a Heartache"	Ronnie Scott / Steve Wolfe	non-album single	3:30
14.	"Dirty Looks"	David Robbins / Van Stephenson	Dirty Looks	3:48
15.	"Tell Her No"	Rod Argent	Dirty Looks	3:36
