= Country Classics (Juice Newton album) =

Compilation album by Juice Newton
- Released: December 3, 2002
- Genre: Country pop
- Length: 52:39
- Label: EMI

Juice Newton chronology
Every Road Leads Back to You (2002)	Country Classics (2002)	The Gift of Christmas (2007)

Country Classics is a compilation album by country pop singer Juice Newton. It was released by EMI America Records on December 3, 2002. The album comprises four songs taken from her "breakthrough" album Juice (1981), four from her follow-up album Quiet Lies (1982), two each from her pre-Juice albums Take Heart (1979) and Well Kept Secret (1978), and the title song from Come to Me. Two songs featured in this compilation, "It's a Heartache" and "Let's Keep It That Way" had hitherto been released only as singles, the latter being Newton's first top 40 country hit.

The CD also includes the rare "country single mix" of "The Sweetest Thing (I've Ever Known)", which replaced the string arrangement with a steel guitar. This is the only commercial CD to include this version.

== Track listing ==
Tracks 1–12 by Juice Newton; tracks 13–15 by Juice Newton & Silver Spur
No.	Title	Writer(s)	Original album	Length
1.	"It's a Heartache"	Ronnie Scott, Steve Wolfe	non-album single	3:29
2.	"Let's Keep It That Way"	Rafe Van Hoy	non-album single	3:22
3.	"Anyway You Want Me"	Chip Taylor	Take Heart	3:25
4.	"Sunshine (Jonathan Edwards song)"	Jonathan Edwards	Take Heart	2:57
5.	"Angel of the Morning"	Chip Taylor	Juice	3:49
6.	"All I Have to Do Is Dream"	Felice and Boudleaux Bryant	Juice	3:10
7.	"Queen of Hearts"	Hank DeVito	Juice	3:25
8.	"The Sweetest Thing (I've Ever Known)"	Otha Young	Juice	4:04
9.	"Heart of the Night"	John Bettis, Michael Clark	Quiet Lies	4:06
10.	"I'm Gonna Be Strong"	Barry Mann, Cynthia Weil	Quiet Lies	3:36
11.	"Love's Been a Little Bit Hard on Me"	Gary Burr	Quiet Lies	3:12
12.	"Break It to Me Gently"	Diane Lambert, Joe Seneca	Quiet Lies	4:00
13.	"Come to Me"	Gillman, R. Oppenheimer	Come to Me	3:27
14.	"A Love Like Yours (Don't Come Knockin' Everyday)"	Brian Holland, Lamont Dozier, Eddie Holland	Well Kept Secret	3:29
15.	"Hey! Baby"	Bruce Channel	Well Kept Secret	3:08
