= Emotion (Juice Newton album) =

Studio album by Juice Newton
- Released: 1987
- Genres: Country pop; country rock
- Length: 32:33
- Label: RCA Victor
- Producer: Richard Landis

Juice Newton chronology
Old Flame (1985)	Emotion (1987)	Ain't Gonna Cry (1989)

Singles from Emotion
- 1. "First Time Caller" Released: September 12, 1987; 2. "Tell Me True" Released: February 27, 1988

Emotion is the eighth studio album by American country pop singer Juice Newton. It was released by RCA Records in 1987 and was the last of Newton's albums to appear on the Billboard charts.

== Overview ==
Juice Newton began her recording career in 1975 but did not achieve major stardom until the release of her 1981 album Juice. The album was a crossover success and yielded three hit singles, "Angel of the Morning", "Queen of Hearts", and "The Sweetest Thing (I've Ever Known)". The last of these peaked at number one on the Billboard Country Chart. She followed Juice with Quiet Lies (1982), an album that brought her two more hits, "Love's Been a Little Bit Hard on Me" and "Break It to Me Gently", of which the latter earned her the Grammy Award for Best Country Vocal Performance, Female. Newton's 1985 album Old Flame was her country breakthrough, spawning three number one hits "You Make Me Want to Make You Mine", "Hurt", and the duet with Eddie Rabbitt "Both to Each Other (Friends & Lovers)" and also three additional Top Ten hits: "Old Flame", "Cheap Love", and "What Can I Do with My Heart".

Regarding her music Newton stated in 1987, "It's country-rock or pop-country or Nashville rock or some word like that, but I feel it's the same kind of music that Fleetwood Mac was. To me, that music was folk-rock."

Emotion was released by RCA Records in 1987. It was the last of Newton's albums to appear on Billboard's Top Country Albums chart and peaked at number 59. The album had two single releases. "First Time Caller" peaked at number 24 on Billboard's Hot Country Songs chart on September 12, 1987, while "Tell Me True" peaked at number 8 on the same chart on February 27, 1988. Also featured on the album are "Emotions", a song originally recorded by Brenda Lee that peaked at number 7 on the Billboard Hot 100 chart in 1961, and "'Til You Cry", which later became a hit for country singer Eddy Raven, peaking at number 4 on the Hot Country Songs chart in 1989.

In discussing Emotion, music historian Neil Daniels noted:

With Emotion, Newton chose not to follow in the country rock footsteps of Old Flame and instead opted for a more dulcet, thoughtful sounding release. Emotion's more upbeat songs are "Tell Me True" and "Walkin' Into Trouble", with the rest of the material being a far more quiet affair such as the beautiful "First Time Caller". Nevertheless her vocals are truly magnetic. Other standout performances include "The Old Bye And Bye", written by her longtime collaborator Otha Young and a rich version of Deborah Allen's "If I Didn’t Love You". "I Still Love You" and "Someone Believed" are both sung with enviable passion. Emotion is a daunting album rich in emotional texture and a mellow vibe. It was misunderstood upon its original release.

== Track listing ==
No.	Title	Writer(s)	Length
1.	"First Time Caller"	Reed Nielsen	3:40
2.	"Tell Me True"	Brent Maher, Paul Kennerley	3:10
3.	"Emotions"	Mel Tillis, Ramsey Kearney	3:05
4.	"Walkin' into Trouble"	Gary Burr, Nielsen	2:55
5.	"If I Didn't Love You"	Deborah Allen, Rafe Van Hoy	3:44
6.	"I Still Love You"	Otha Young	4:25
7.	"Someone Believed"	Joanne Christy, Johnny Pierce, Paul Solomon	3:42
8.	"Old Bye and Bye"	David Scheibner, Young	3:47
9.	"'Til You Cry"	Rick Giles, Steve Bogard	4:05

== Personnel ==
- Juice Newton – vocals
- Dean Parks, Johnny Pierce – acoustic guitar
- Beth Anderson – backing vocals
- Donna Davidson – backing vocals
- Herb Pedersen – backing vocals
- Jerry Whitman – backing vocals
- Jim Haas – backing vocals
- Jon Joyce – backing vocals
- Susan Boyd – backing vocals
- Vince Gill – backing vocals
- Neil Stubenhaus – bass
- Carlos Vega, John Robinson – drums
- Dann Huff – electric guitar
- George Doering – electric guitar
- Tommy Morgan – harmonica
- Jim Lang – organ
- Jay Dee Maness – pedal steel guitar
- Richard Landis – percussion, synthesizer
- Philip Aaberg – piano
- David Woodford – saxophone
- Alan Pasqua – synthesizer
- Luis Cabaza – synthesizer
