= The Trouble with Angels =

The Trouble with Angels may refer to:

- The Trouble with Angels (Filter album), 2010
- The Trouble with Angels (film), a 1966 comedy film
- The Trouble with Angels (Juice Newton album), 1998
- "The Trouble with Angels", a 2000 song by Kathy Mattea
