= The Ultimate Hits Collection =

The Ultimate Hits Collection may refer to:

- The Ultimate Hits Collection (Johnny Mathis album)
- The Ultimate Hits Collection (Juice Newton album)
