= Neil Stubenhaus =

American bass guitarist (born 1953)

- Born: July 18, 1953 (age 73)
- Instrument: Bass guitar
- Years active: 1977–present
- Formerly of: Blood, Sweat & Tears

Neil Stubenhaus is an American bass guitarist.

== Career ==
He started his musical training playing drums and switched to bass guitar at the age of 12. In one of his early bands, The Neighbourhood in 1969, he played with future Kiss guitarist Vinnie Vincent, with whom he played again in 1974 in Little Anthony and the Imperials.

He studied at the Berklee College of Music where he graduated in 1975. After graduation, he was recommended by Steve Swallow and started teaching while playing in a band with another Berklee student Steve Smith (Vital Information, Journey). While at Berklee, Neil met session drummers Vinnie Colaiuta (who has worked with famous musicians such as Sting, & Frank Zappa) and John Robinson (who has also worked with superstars, including Barbra Streisand, Quincy Jones, Chaka Khan, Michael Jackson).

In 1977 he joined Blood Sweat & Tears and recorded David Clayton-Thomas' first solo album. In 1978, he went on tour with Larry Carlton. That led him to move to the West Coast where, following recommendations from Carlton, he met Mike Post and other composers and started doing sessions. Since 1979, Stubenhaus performed on more than 600 albums (of which 70 + have been Grammy Award-nominated), over 20 Grammy-winning songs and 60 + Gold and/or Platinum records. He has also recorded over 150 movie soundtracks as well as countless jingles and commercials.

For over 20 years, Stubenhaus has been Barbra Streisand's and Quincy Jones' main bass player. Other artists he recorded/toured/played with include Aerosmith, Anita Baker, Gigi D'Alessio, Elton John, Rod Stewart, Carl Wilson, Stephanie Mills, Juice Newton, Whitney Houston, Billy Joel, Frank Sinatra, Dolly Parton, Thelma Houston, Irene Cara, Al Kooper, Roberta Flack, Nancy Wilson, Patti LaBelle, Peter Allen, Kenny Rogers, Peabo Bryson, Michael Franks, Barry Manilow, Billy Preston, Willie Nelson, Michael Bolton, Glenn Frey, Natalie Cole, Jennifer Holliday, Olivia Newton-John, Toni Braxton, Brenda Russell, Solomon Burke, Randy Newman, Ricky Martin, Dan Fogelberg, Boz Scaggs, Glenn Medeiros, Ilse DeLange, Céline Dion, Terence Trent D'Arby, Sheena Easton, Melissa Manchester, John Fogerty, Liza Minnelli, Cher, Ray Parker Jr., Patti Austin, Sam Phillips, Vonda Shepard, Rickie Lee Jones, Adam Cohen, Ringo Starr, Paul Anka, Faith Hill, Shirley Bassey, Joe Cocker, Bobby Caldwell, Taylor Dayne, Vince Gill, Randy Crawford, George Benson, Al Jarreau, Don Henley, Luis Miguel, Steve Cropper, Julio Iglesias, B.B. King, Michael McDonald, Bette Midler, Hanson, The Corrs, Steve Lukather, Milton Nascimento, Glen Campbell, José Feliciano, Pointer Sisters, Eros Ramazzotti, Bonnie Raitt, Lee Ritenour, Lionel Richie, Selena, Diane Schuur, Tom Scott, Kirk Whalum, Lisa Stansfield, and Cho Yong-Pil.

In 2000, Stubenhaus was a participant in Star Licks Productions', All-Star Bass Series.

He is featured on Laura Dickinson's debut album – One For My Baby - To Frank Sinatra With Love – playing "My Funny Valentine", a layered chordal electric bass and vocal duet that Ms. Dickinson arranged specifically for him.

== Collaborations ==
- Clayton – David Clayton-Thomas (1978)
- Headlines – Paul Anka (1979)
- Words & Music – Alessi Brothers (1979)
- Wet – Barbra Streisand (1979)
- Somethin' 'Bout You Baby I Like – Glen Campbell (1980)
- Nielsen/Pearson – Nielsen Pearson (1980)
- Dreamlovers – Tanya Tucker (1980)
- Mary MacGregor – Mary MacGregor (1980)
- Man's Best Friend – Livingston Taylor (1980)
- Dolly, Dolly, Dolly – Dolly Parton (1981)
- Juice – Juice Newton (1981)
- Playin' My Thang – Steve Cropper (1981)
- Breakin' Away – Al Jarreau (1981)
- Nightwalker – Gino Vannelli (1981)
- Windsong – Randy Crawford (1982)
- Quiet Lies – Juice Newton (1982)
- Heartlight – Neil Diamond (1982)
- Championship Wrestling – Al Kooper (1982)
- Pressin' On – Billy Preston (1982)
- I'm the One – Roberta Flack (1982)
- Dirty Looks – Juice Newton (1983)
- Thelma Houston – Thelma Houston (1983)
- Imagination – Helen Reddy (1983)
- Youngblood – Carl Wilson (1983)
- Merciless – Stephanie Mills (1983)
- What a Feelin' – Irene Cara (1983)
- Not the Boy Next Door – Peter Allen (1983)
- I'm Ready – Natalie Cole (1983)
- Emotion – Barbra Streisand (1984)
- Once Upon a Christmas – Kenny Rogers, Dolly Parton (1984)
- Qualifying Heat – Thelma Houston (1984)
- Primitive – Neil Diamond (1984)
- Straight from the Heart – Peabo Bryson (1984)
- What About Me? – Kenny Rogers (1984)
- Finder of Lost Loves – Dionne Warwick (1985)
- The Heart of the Matter – Kenny Rogers (1985)
- Ya Soy Tuyo – José Feliciano (1985)
- Nobody Wants to Be Alone – Crystal Gayle (1985)
- 20/20 – George Benson (1985)
- Manilow – Barry Manilow (1985)
- Shake Me to Wake Me – Steve Camp (1985)
- Gettin' Away with Murder – Patti Austin (1985)
- Black and White in a Grey World – Sam Phillips (1985)
- Rapture – Anita Baker (1986)
- Eye of the Zombie – John Fogerty (1986)
- Winner in You – Patti LaBelle (1986)
- Headed for the Future – Neil Diamond (1986)
- Nine Lives – Bonnie Raitt (1986)
- The Bridge – Billy Joel (1986)
- They Don't Make Them Like They Used To – Kenny Rogers (1986)
- The Way Back Home – Vince Gill (1987)
- Get Close to My Love – Jennifer Holliday (1987)
- Friends for Life – Debby Boone (1987)
- Emotion – Juice Newton (1987)
- After Dark – Ray Parker Jr. (1987)
- Reservations for Two – Dionne Warwick (1987)
- I Prefer the Moonlight – Kenny Rogers (1987)
- Everlasting – Natalie Cole (1987)
- Twice the Love – George Benson (1988)
- The Rumour – Olivia Newton-John (1988)
- Land of Dreams – Randy Newman (1988)
- Not Me – Glenn Medeiros (1988)
- Oasis – Roberta Flack (1988)
- Soul Searchin' – Glenn Frey (1988)
- Positive – Peabo Bryson (1988)
- Till I Loved You – Barbra Streisand (1988)
- As Good as It Gets – Deniece Williams (1988)
- Kiss of Life – Siedah Garrett (1988)
- Good to Be Back – Natalie Cole (1989)
- Speaking of Dreams – Joan Baez (1989)
- Heart of Stone – Cher (1989)
- Soul Provider – Michael Bolton (1989)
- Be Yourself – Patti LaBelle (1989)
- Lukather – Steve Lukather (1989)
- Special Love – Deniece Williams (1989)
- Somebody Loves You – Paul Anka (1989)
- Vonda Shepard – Vonda Shepard (1989)
- Flying Cowboys – Rickie Lee Jones (1989)
- Glenn Medeiros – Glenn Medeiros (1990)
- Some People's Lives – Bette Midler (1990)
- Blue Pacific – Michael Franks (1990)
- Love Is Gonna Getcha – Patti Austin (1990)
- Christmas – Stephanie Mills (1991)
- Curtis Stigers – Curtis Stigers (1991)
- From the Heart – Tommy Page (1991)
- Night Calls – Joe Cocker (1991)
- Pure Schuur – Diane Schuur (1991)
- Free – Rick Astley (1991)
- Vagabond Heart – Rod Stewart (1991)
- The Dreams – Cho Yong-Pil (1991)
- Time Takes Time – Ringo Starr (1992)
- Timeless: The Classics – Michael Bolton (1992)
- Duets – Elton John (1993)
- Soul Dancing – Taylor Dayne (1993)
- Symphony or Damn – Terence Trent D'Arby (1993)
- The Colour of My Love – Céline Dion (1993)
- Back to Broadway – Barbra Streisand (1993)
- Some Change – Boz Scaggs (1994)
- Holly & Ivy – Natalie Cole (1994)
- Through the Fire – Peabo Bryson (1994)
- My Cherie – Sheena Easton (1995)
- Dreaming of You – Selena (1995)
- No Resemblance Whatsoever – Dan Fogelberg (1995)
- Time Was – Curtis Stigers (1995)
- If My Heart Had Wings – Melissa Manchester (1995)
- Gently – Liza Minnelli (1996)
- Fade into Light – Boz Scaggs (1996)
- The Definition of Soul – Solomon Burke (1997)
- Lisa Stansfield – Lisa Stansfield (1997)
- Higher Ground – Barbra Streisand (1997)
- Across from Midnight – Joe Cocker (1997)
- Adam Cohen – Adam Cohen (1998)
- No Ordinary World – Joe Cocker (1999)
- Paris Rain – Brenda Russell (2000)
- Christmas Memories – Barbra Streisand (2001)
- The Great Divide – Willie Nelson (2002)
- The Movie Album – Barbra Streisand (2003)
- Clean Up – Ilse DeLange (2003)
- Back in Town – Matt Dusk (2006)
- What Matters Most – Barbra Streisand (2011)
- Sound Advice – Patti Austin (2011)
- Seven – Lisa Stansfield (2014)
- It's the Girls! – Bette Midler (2014)
- On Purpose – Clint Black (2015)
