= Dirty Looks (album) =

Studio album by Juice Newton
- Released: 1983
- Studios: Capitol Studios and Conway Studios (Hollywood, California); Sound Castle Recorders (Los Angeles, California); Location Recording Service (Burbank, California)
- Genres: Country pop, country rock
- Length: 37:48
- Label: Capitol
- Producer: Richard Landis

Juice Newton chronology
Quiet Lies (1982)	Dirty Looks (1983)	Greatest Hits (1984)

Singles from Dirty Looks
- 1. "Tell Her No" Released: 1983; 2. "Dirty Looks" Released: 1983; 3. "Stranger at My Door" Released: 1983

Professional ratings
Review scores
Source	Rating
The Encyclopedia of Popular Music	3/5 stars

Dirty Looks is the fifth solo album by the American country pop singer Juice Newton. It was released by Capitol Records in 1983.

== Overview ==
Dirty Looks was Newton's follow-up to Juice (her "breakthrough" album) and Quiet Lies. Both had been major hits for Capitol and, between them, had produced six top ten singles. With their success, Capitol seemed determined more than ever to push Newton further into the pop market. Dirty Looks was not as successful as Juice and Quiet Lies and produced only three modest hits. "Tell Her No", a reworking of The Zombies's 1965 top ten hit, peaked at number 27 on the Billboard Pop chart while "Dirty Looks" only reached number 90. "Stranger at My Door" had a modest peak at number 45 on the Billboard Country chart.

In summing up the album's modest success, the music critic Ian McFarlane noted, "The first clue was the album cover which featured a series of nine photos of Juice looking bright, playful and not a little coy, whereas with previous covers (Juice and Quiet Lies in particular) she’d radiated a quiet confidence and sheer determination by staring straight at the camera lens. The second clue was the preponderance of synthesizer arrangements and big crashing guitar chords among the songs written by rock and pop based performers such as Van Stephenson ("Dirty Looks"), Rod Argent ("Tell Her No") and Marc Jordan ("Slipping Away"). Even the usually restrained Otha Young seemed to be working the big pop riffs with "Don't Bother Me".

Despite this, Dirty Looks sold well enough in Canada to be certified Gold on October 13, 1983. On June 26, 2007 Dirty Looks and a later Newton album, Old Flame, were released on a "2 for 1" compact disc. The closing track on the album, "For Believers", was later reused with a new recording for Newton's 2007 album, The Gift of Christmas.

== Critical reception ==
People called the album a "bumper crop of delightful tunes."

== Track listing ==
No.	Title	Writer(s)	Length
1.	"Dirty Looks"	Dave Robbins, Van Stephenson	3:50
2.	"Tell Her No"	Rod Argent	3:35
3.	"Til I Loved You"	Dave Robbins, Jeff Silbar, Van Stephenson	3:57
4.	"Keeping Me on My Toes"	Troy Seals, Eddie Setser	4:10
5.	"Twenty Years Ago"	Wood Newton, Michael Noble, Michael Spriggs, Daniel Tyler	3:45
6.	"Don't Bother Me"	Otha Young	3:43
7.	"Stranger at My Door"	Charlie Black, Rory Bourke, Kerry Chater	3:29
8.	"Slipping Away"	Marc Jordan, Steve Kipner	4:10
9.	"Runaway Hearts"	Bob McDill, Hunter Moore	4:50
10.	"For Believers"	Otha Young	2:19

== Personnel ==
- Juice Newton – lead vocals
- Vinnie Colaiuta, Rick Shlosser, Rick Marotta – drums
- Neil Stubenhaus – bass guitar
- Otha Young – acoustic guitar, synthesizer, programming
- Hugh McCracken, Mark Goldenberg – electric guitar
- Doug Livingston – pedal steel guitar
- Randy Kerber – piano
- George Doering, Fred Tackett – acoustic guitar, electric guitar
- David Foster, Phil Aaberg – piano and Fender Rhodes
- Jim Lang – organ, synthesizer programming
- Michael Boddicker, Vince DiCola – synthesizer
- Michael Casey Young – synthesizer programming
- Tom Scott – flute and lyricon solo
- Dave Boruff – saxophone
- Steve Forman, Richard Landis – percussion
- Tommy Funderbunk, Tom Kelly and Timothy B. Schmit; Maxine Waters, Clydene Waters and Julia Jackson; Richard Landis, Juice Newton and Johnny Pierce – backing vocals

- John Kosh - Art Director, Album cover designer
- Photography- Aaron Rapoport
