= Well Kept Secret (Juice Newton album) =

Studio album by Juice Newton
- Released: 1978
- Genre: Country rock
- Length: 35:34
- Label: Capitol
- Producers: Otha Young, Juice Newton, John Palladino

Juice Newton chronology
Come to Me (1977)	Well Kept Secret (1978)	Take Heart (1979)

Singles from Well Kept Secret
- 1. "Hey! Baby" Released: 1978

Professional ratings
Review scores
Source	Rating
Allmusic	3/5 stars

Well Kept Secret is the fourth studio album by country pop singer Juice Newton. Her first three albums – Juice Newton and Silver Spur (1975) and After the Dust Settles (1976) for RCA Records, and Come to Me for Capitol (1977) – were credited to the group Juice Newton and Silver Spur. Well Kept Secret was released by Capitol in 1978 and is Newton's first album as a solo artist, though Silver Spur remained her backing band for five more years. The album marked Newton's most rock-oriented record up to that time and features five songs written by her long-time collaborator Otha Young. Other songs on the album include cover versions of Bruce Channel's 1961 hit "Hey! Baby" and the Holland–Dozier–Holland song, "A Love Like Yours (Don't Come Knocking Everyday)", which was originally recorded in 1963 by Martha and the Vandellas as the B-side to their hit single "Heat Wave". Newton's rendition of "Hey! Baby" was the only single released from Well Kept Secret. Neither charted, prompting rock critic Jim Worbois to note: "The title of this album seems to apply to her career as much as anything. She was still a couple years away from any substantial success. Newton seems to be without direction on this record and, as such, is trying some harder-edged material."

== Track listing ==
No.	Title	Writer(s)	Length
1.	"So Many Ways"	Curtis Stone	2:59
2.	"Close Enough"	Otha Young	3:25
3.	"I'll Never Love Again"	Micky McGee	3:18
4.	"Go Easy On Me"	Otha Young	3:48
5.	"A Love Like Yours (Don't Come Knockin' Everyday)"	Holland–Dozier–Holland	3:32
6.	"Hey! Baby"	Bruce Channel	3:13
7.	"Tell My Baby Goodbye"	Otha Young	3:05
8.	"No Reason"	Curtis Stone	3:58
9.	"It's Not Impossible"	Otha Young	3:36
10.	"If There Could Be"	Otha Young	4:40
