= First Time Caller =

Single by Juice Newton

from the album Emotion
- B-side: "'Til You Cry"
- Released: July 18, 1987
- Genre: Country
- Length: 3:40
- Label: RCA
- Songwriter(s): Reed Nielsen
- Producer(s): Richard Landis

Juice Newton singles chronology
"What Can I Do with My Heart" (1986)	"First Time Caller" (1987)	"Tell Me True" (1987)

"First Time Caller" is a song recorded by American country music artist Juice Newton. It was released in July 1987 as the first single from the album Emotion. The song reached #24 on the Billboard Hot Country Singles & Tracks chart. The song was written by Reed Nielsen.

== Charts ==
Chart (1987)	Peak position
US Hot Country Songs (Billboard)	24
Canadian RPM Country Tracks	23
