= After the Dust Settles =

Studio album by Juice Newton & Silver Spur
- Released: 1976
- Genre: Country
- Length: 35:48
- Label: RCA Victor
- Producer: Alan V. Abrahams

Juice Newton & Silver Spur chronology
Juice Newton & Silver Spur (1975)	After the Dust Settles (1976)	Come to Me (1977)

After the Dust Settles is the second studio album by Juice Newton & Silver Spur, released by RCA Records in 1976. "If I Ever" was the album's debut and only single.

== Track listing ==
Side one
No.	Title	Writer(s)	Lead vocals	Length
1.	"Slip Away"	William Armstrong; Wilbur Terrell; Marcus Daniel	Juice Newton	3:02
2.	"If I Ever"	Otha Young	Newton	3:50
3.	"Love Me One More Time"	Tom Kealey; Linda Kealey	Newton	3:00
4.	"May Day"	Otha Young	Otha Young	3:38
5.	"Good Time to Say Goodbye"	Robbie Gillman; Juice Newton; Lynne Bernfield	Newton	3:12

Side two
No.	Title	Writer(s)	Lead vocals	Length
6.	"Blue"	Doug Haywood; Mickey McGee	Newton	3:27
7.	"One Step Away"	Otha Young	Newton	4:13
8.	"Bye Bye Baby"	Otha Young	Newton	3:50
9.	"(All I Want to Do Is) Feel Good"	Tom Kealey; Linda Kealey	Tom Kealy	3:02
10.	"Sailor Song"	Otha Young	Newton	4:44
Total length:				35:48

== Personnel ==
- Juice Newton – vocals, acoustic guitar
- Otha Young – vocals, acoustic and electric guitar
- Tom Kealey – vocals, bass
- Curtis Cloonan – slide guitar
- Ed Black – pedal steel guitar
- Robbie Gillman – piano, synthesizer
- Mickey McGee – drums, percussion, backing vocals
- Alan Abrahams – cabasa, percussion
- Clarence McDonald – organ, piano
- Bones Howe – tambourine, executive producer
- Charlie Harwood – piano
- Charles Merriam – backing vocals
