= Can't Wait All Night =

Studio album by Juice Newton
- Released: June 18, 1984
- Studio: Various: Doering Studio; Capitol Recording; Ocean Way
- Genre: Country rock; pop rock; adult contemporary music
- Length: 36:43
- Label: RCA Victor
- Producer: Richard Landis

Juice Newton chronology
Greatest Hits (1984)	Can't Wait All Night (1984)	Old Flame (1985)

Professional ratings
Retrospective review
Review scores
Source	Rating
AllMusic	2/5 stars

Can't Wait All Night is the sixth studio album by American pop and country singer Juice Newton, released by RCA Records in 1984. The album was produced by Richard Landis and is Newton's last studio album to chart on the Billboard 200, reaching No. 128.

== Overview ==
Can't Wait All Night marked the end of Newton's run on the pop charts, as it contains her last two songs to date to chart on the Billboard Hot 100: "A Little Love", which peaked at No. 44, and the edgy Bryan Adams-written and produced title track, which peaked at No. 66. Both songs were aided by popular music videos. The former is also Newton's most recent Top 10 hit on the Adult Contemporary chart, peaking at No. 7. Her next album, Old Flame, would mark Newton's return full-force to the country music charts.

The album was re-issued on CD by Wounded Bird in 2007.

== Critical reception ==
Jim Allen of AllMusic retrospectively gave the album two out of five stars and wrote that "In the wake of Juice Newton's massive success with her country-pop sound in the early 1980s, she started fiddling with the formula" adding that "while the experimentation process failed to keep her in the charts, it did send her down some different stylistic routes, like the glossy, rock-tinged sound of the album's lead-off cut, "A Little Love," which was the closest thing to a hit on the album."

== Track listing ==
Side one
No.	Title	Writer(s)	Length
1.	"A Little Love"	Todd Sharp; Danny Douma; Richard Feldman	3:58
2.	"(You Don't Hear) The One That Gets You"	Van Stephenson; Jan Buckingham	3:29
3.	"Can't Wait All Night"	Bryan Adams; Jim Vallance	4:01
4.	"Restless Heart"	Stephenson; Tim DuBois; Dave Robbins	3:50
5.	"Easy Way Out"	Tom Kelly; Billy Steinberg	3:28

Side two
No.	Title	Writer(s)	Length
6.	"Let's Dance"	Jim Lee	2:40
7.	"He's Gone"	Reed Nielsen	3:47
8.	"You Don't Know Me"	Cindy Walker; Eddy Arnold	3:38
9.	"Eye of a Hurricane"	Otha Young; Nielsen	4:07
10.	"Waiting for the Sun"	Young; Tim James	3:47
Total length:			36:43

== Personnel ==
- Juice Newton – lead and background vocals
- Mike Baird – drums
- Dennis Belfield – bass guitar
- George Doering – guitar; keyboards
- Dann Huff – guitar
- Fred Tackett – guitar
- Kevin Dukes – guitar
- Alan Pasqua – keyboards
- Reed Nielsen – keyboards
- Richard Gibbs – keyboards
- Jim Lang – Hammond organ
- Joe Peskin – saxophone
- Otha Young – percussion
- Richard Landis – percussion
- Tom Kelly – backing vocals
- Tom Funderbunk – backing vocals
- Bill Champlin – backing vocals
- Andrew Gold – backing vocals
- Kenny Edwards – backing vocals
- Greg Prestopino – backing vocals
- Gary Durrett – backing vocals
- Maxine Anderson – backing vocals
- Linda McCrary – backing vocals
- Lisa Roberts – backing vocals
- Howard Smith – backing vocals
- Phyllis St. James – backing vocals
- Jon Joyce – backing vocals
- John Kosh- Art Direction and Design
- Photography - Robert Blakeman
