= Juice Newton & Silver Spur =

Studio album by Juice Newton & Silver Spur
- Released: 1975
- Genre: Country rock
- Length: 30:58
- Label: RCA Victor
- Producer: Bones Howe

Juice Newton & Silver Spur chronology
Juice Newton & Silver Spur (1975)	After the Dust Settles (1976)

Juice Newton & Silver Spur is the debut studio album by country-rock trio Juice Newton & Silver Spur. The album contains Newton's first charting single, "Love Is a Word", and the original version of "The Sweetest Thing (I've Ever Known)", which was re-recorded in 1981 as a Newton solo piece and became a number-one hit.

== Track listing ==
All tracks are written by Otha Young, except where noted.

Side one
No.	Title	Lead vocals	Length
1.	"Catwillow River"	Juice Newton	2:50
2.	"Just Remember Who Your Friends Are"	Newton	3:14
3.	"Love Is a Word"	Newton	2:49
4.	"The Sweetest Thing (I've Ever Known)"	Newton	3:34
5.	"Roll On, Trucker"	Otha Young	2:34

Side two
No.	Title	Writer(s)	Lead vocals	Length
6.	"Won't You Stay (Just a Little Bit Longer)?"		Newton	3:14
7.	"It's High Time"	Tom Kealey	Newton	3:24
8.	"You Please Me"	Kealey	Tom Kealey	2:48
9.	"The Shelter of Your Love"		Newton	3:06
10.	"Stand By Me, Jesus"		Newton	3:25
Total length:				30:58

== Personnel ==
- Juice Newton – lead and background vocals; guitar
- Otha Young – lead and background vocals; guitar; synthesizer
- Tom Kealey – lead and background vocals; bass guitar, guitar
- Hal Blaine – drums; percussion
- Jeff Porcaro – drums
- Mike Melvoin – keyboards; string arrangements
- Rusty Young – dobro; pedal steel guitar
