= Wha-Koo =

American rock band

- Genres: Rock, soft rock
- Years active: 1975–1979
- Labels: ABC Records, Epic Records
- Past members: Danny Douma David Palmer; Andy Silvester; Richard Kosinski; Claude Pepper; Reinie Press; Peter Freiberger; Eddie Tuduri; Nick VanMaarth; Don Francisco; Ron Fransen; Eric Gotthelf; David Woodford Chuck Cochran

Wha-Koo (originally called The Big Wha-Koo) was an American rock band best known for their 1978 single, "(You're Such a) Fabulous Dancer", which peaked at No. 101 on the Billboard and No. 10 on the Australian charts.

== History ==
The Big Wha-Koo were a Los Angeles, California-based soft rock ensemble formed in 1975 under the leadership of singer, songwriter and guitarist Danny Douma. Douma assembled an entourage of veteran musicians that included David Palmer, who had sung lead vocals on two tracks of Steely Dan's debut album Can't Buy a Thrill, Nick Van Maarth, from Buddy Holly's backup band, The Crickets, Don Francisco, formerly of Crowfoot and Atlee and British blues man Andy Silvester, formerly of Savoy Brown. L.A.-based session musician Reinie Press, bass player on many of Neil Diamond's most successful recordings, contributed bass and saxophone on two tracks on the band's 1977 debut album, The Big Wha-Koo for ABC Records.

Peter Freiberger replaced Andy Silvester on bass for the band's 1978 album, Berkshire. Produced by Grammy Award winner Ken Caillat, it proved to be the band's most successful release. Berkshire featured "You're Such a Fabulous Dancer", composed by Douma. Although a top ten hit in some international markets, it did little in the American music charts.

In 1978, Douma left Wha-Koo to pursue a solo career. He released a solo album, Night Eyes, on Warner Bros. Records. The album featured many of the members of Wha-Koo as well as guest appearances by Eric Clapton, Garth Hudson from The Band and several members of Fleetwood Mac. Douma toured with Fleetwood Mac as a supporting act for the remainder of 1979 and then left the music industry soon after. Chuck Cochran replaced Danny Douma on vocals and lead guitar and was with Wha-Koo at two notable appearances in 1978. On August 26, they played before an estimated crowd of 110,000 music fans at the Canada Jam festival near Toronto, Ontario and on October 29, the band performed with Thin Lizzy on the steps of the Sydney Opera House in Sydney, Australia before an estimated crowd of 100,000.

Cochran left the band after the tour to work with Robb Royer of Bread, Mike Finnigan, Crosby, Stills and Nash and others. Around that time, Wha-Koo released their third album, Fragile Line, on Epic Records. Although no longer with the band, Cochran's lead guitar, background vocals and songs are featured on the album. By then the band was led by David Palmer and featured new members Ron Fransen, David Woodford and Eric Gotthelf. More rock-oriented, this release enjoyed some critical success but it did not enjoy commercial success and the group disbanded soon after.

== Post-breakup ==
In the early 1980s, Douma founded "The Writers Store" a resource center and retail outlet for writers and filmmakers. In 2002 he founded a second company, "Innoventive Software", publishers of film production and storyboard software. Danny Douma died on June 1, 2010, from cancer in Florence, Oregon.

Palmer contributed the song "Silhouette" to the film Teen Wolf and the song "She's My Baby" to the film, Fast Times at Ridgemont High. He also contributed songs to the TV series, The Heights and he went on to record with Laura Branigan and Jamie Walters amongst others. Today he's a fine art and portrait photographer in the Los Angeles area.

Andy Silvester, who departed after Wha-Koo's first album, became a member of the Honeydrippers (featuring Robert Plant) and was a founding member of the acoustic British rhythm and blues revival group, The Big Town Playboys. He has also played with The Mike Sanchez band.

Eddie Tuduri suffered a serious spinal cord injury in a body surfing accident in 1997. He founded "The Rhythmic Arts Project" (TRAP) later that year as an educational program for children and adults with developmental and intellectual differences.

Richard Kozinski has scored or co-scored almost 30 motion pictures and 300 aired network television episodes including episodes of Mad About You, Gravedale High and Teen Wolf.

Claude Pepper, alias Jack Mack, formed the Los Angeles-based rhythm and soul band Jack Mack and the HeartAttack in 1980 and played with the band until 1987. He died at his home in Sacramento in February 2003.

David Woodford has since recorded and toured with Aaron Neville, Bonnie Raitt, Aerosmith, Rod Stewart, The Shirelles and P. Diddy amongst others.

Chuck Cochran later worked as a singer and guitarist with Jim Messina, Tim Weisberg, Norman Gimbel, Fred Karlin, Mike Finnigan, Robb Royer, Larry Knechtel, Kim Carnes and David Lasley. He also wrote songs for Laura Branigan, Captain & Tennille and others.

== Discography ==
=== Albums ===
Year	Title	AUS chart	Catalogue number
1977	The Big Wha-Koo	-	AB 971
1978	Berkshire	51	ABCL 5283
1979	Fragile Line	85	EPC 83875

=== Singles ===
Year	Title	US	AUS	RSA	ZIM	Album
1977	"Whisky Voices"	-	-	-	-	The Big Wha-Koo
1977	"Save Your Tears"	-	-	-	-	The Big Wha-Koo
1978	"You're Such a Fabulous Dancer"	101	10	9	4	Berkshire
1979	"Don't Say You Love Me"	-	-	-	-	Fragile Line
