= Ride 'Em Cowboy (song) =

Single by Paul Davis
- B-side: "I'm the Only Sinner (in Salt Lake City)"
- Released: 1974
- Genre: Country
- Length: 3:52
- Label: Bang
- Songwriter(s): Paul Davis
- Producer(s): Paul Davis

Paul Davis singles chronology
"Boogie Woogie Man" (1973)	"Ride 'Em Cowboy" (1974)	"Keep Our Love Alive" (1975)

“Ride 'Em Cowboy” is a song written by American singer-songwriter Paul Davis. First recorded on Davis' 1974 album of the same name, the single release peaked at No. 4 on the Billboard Adult Contemporary chart, No. 23 on the Billboard Hot 100, and No. 47 on the Country chart. It also charted in Canada and Australia.

== Chart performance ==
Chart (1974)	Peak position
Canada RPM Adult Contemporary	6
Canada RPM Top Singles	30
US Adult Contemporary (Billboard)	4
US Billboard Hot 100	23

== Covers ==
Artists who have recorded versions of the song include:

- Pluto Shervington (on his 1975 album Pluto)
- Buddy Alan (on his 1978 Sun Devil Records single)
- Juice Newton (on her 1981 album Juice) - U.S. Billboard Country #32, in 1984
- David Allan Coe (on the 1983 Kat Family Records album All American Cowboys)
- The Remingtons (on their 1993 album Aim for the Heart)
