= What Can I Do with My Heart =

Single by Juice Newton

from the album Old Flame
- B-side: "Let Your Woman Take Of You"
- Released: December 13, 1986
- Genre: Country
- Length: 3:34
- Label: RCA
- Songwriter(s): Otha Young
- Producer(s): Richard Landis

Juice Newton singles chronology
"Cheap Love" (1986)	"What Can I Do with My Heart" (1986)	"First Time Caller" (1987)

"What Can I Do with My Heart " is a song recorded by American country music artist Juice Newton. It was released in December 1986 as the fifth single from the original version of the Old Flame album (subsequent editions of the album contained eight to eleven tracks). In 1987, the song reached #9 on the Billboard Hot Country Singles & Tracks chart. Notably, the song was written by Newton's long-time musical partner Otha Young, who also penned Newton's first number-one country hit, "The Sweetest Thing (I've Ever Known)".

== Charts ==
Chart (1986–1987)	Peak position
US Hot Country Songs (Billboard)	9
Canadian RPM Country Tracks	7
