= Ain't Gonna Cry =

Studio album by Juice Newton
- Released: June 28, 1989
- Genres: Country pop, country rock
- Length: 35:22
- Label: RCA Victor
- Producer: Josh Leo

Juice Newton chronology
Emotion (1987)	Ain't Gonna Cry (1989)	Emotions (1994)

Singles from Ain't Gonna Cry
- 1. "When Love Comes Around The Bend" Released: 1989

Ain't Gonna Cry is the ninth solo studio album by American country pop singer Juice Newton. It was released by RCA Records on June 28, 1989 and was Newton's final album for the label as well as her last album for several years. Though no singles were released to stores, the promotional single, "When Love Comes Around The Bend", peaked at number 40 on the Billboard Hot Country Songs chart on June 17, 1989. The album also contains Newton's cover version of "Then He Kissed Me", a top ten hit for The Crystals in 1963.

== Track listing ==
No.	Title	Writer(s)	Length
1.	"When Love Comes Around the Bend"	Josh Leo, Mark Wright, Pam Tillis	2:24
2.	"Goin' to Work"	Bill Lloyd, Tillis	4:17
3.	"I Ain't Gonna Cry No More"	Don Schlitz, John Hall, Johanna Hall	3:53
4.	"The Moment You Were Mine"	Steve Dorff, Beth Nielsen Chapman	3:28
5.	"Then He Kissed Me"	Ellie Greenwich, Jeff Barry, Phil Spector	3:18
6.	"I'm Only Walkin'"	Cheryl Wheeler	3:35
7.	"Say You'll Be Mine"	Otha Young, Johnny Pierce	3:25
8.	"You're Making It Easy"	Jim Dowell, Linda Young	3:26
9.	"Gonna Find You"	Wendy Waldman, Leo, Jim Photoglo	3:20
10.	"Love Is the Only Chain"	Mary Ann Kennedy, Pat Bunch, Pam Rose	4:16

== Personnel ==
- Mike Baird - drums
- Greg Barnhill - backing vocals
- Richard Bennett - acoustic guitar, electric guitar
- Larry Byrom - electric guitar
- Lenny Castro - percussion
- Gail Davies - backing vocals
- George Doering - electric guitar, acoustic guitar
- Assa Drori - violin
- John Hall - electric guitar, keyboards
- John Hobbs - piano
- Mary Ann Kennedy - backing vocals
- Craig Krampf - drum programming
- Larry M. Lee - backing vocals
- Josh Leo - electric guitar
- Carl Marsh - synthesizer
- Beth Nielsen Chapman - backing vocals
- Mark O'Connor - fiddle
- Dean Parks - acoustic guitar, electric guitar
- John Paruolo - keyboards
- Al Perkins - steel guitar
- Michael Rhodes - bass
- Pam Rose - backing vocals
- Frederick Setkora - cello
- Leland Sklar - bass
- JD Souther - backing vocals
- Harry Stinson - drums, backing vocals
- Gerald Vinci - violin
- Wendy Waldman - backing vocals
- Biff Watson - acoustic guitar, keyboards
- Evan Wilson - viola
- Glenn Worf - bass
- Juice Newton - vocals, acoustic guitar
