= Old Flame (album) =

Studio album by Juice Newton
- Released: October 1985
- Genre: Country rock
- Length: 35:19 (original); 39:12 (reissue)
- Label: RCA Victor
- Producer: Richard Landis

Juice Newton chronology
Can't Wait All Night (1984)	Old Flame (1985)	Emotion (1987)

Singles from Old Flame
- 1. "You Make Me Want to Make You Mine" Released: July 1985; 2. "Hurt" Released: December 1985; 3. "Old Flame" Released: April 1986; 4. "Cheap Love" Released: August 1986; 5. "What Can I Do with My Heart" Released: December 1986

Professional ratings
Review scores
Source	Rating
AllMusic	4.5/5 stars

Old Flame is the seventh studio album by American pop and country singer Juice Newton. It was released in October 1985 by RCA Records.

== Overview ==
Old Flame was recorded after Newton signed a new recording contract with RCA. It peaked at number 12 on the Billboard Top Country Albums chart. In his review of the album music critic Thom Owens notes that "out of all of Juice Newton's albums, Old Flame has the strongest country roots and influences". Featured on the album were cover versions of Del Shannon's 1983 song "Cheap Love", and the pop standard "Hurt," made popular by Roy Hamilton in 1954, Timi Yuro in 1961, and The Manhattans in 1975. Other covers on the album were the Byrds's 1965 song "Feel a Whole Lot Better" and Stealers Wheel's 1972 song "Stuck in the Middle with You".

"You Make Me Want to Make You Mine", written for Newton by Dave Loggins, was the album's lead-off single and went to number one on the Billboard Country chart. The song was her first top ten hit in three years. This was followed by "Hurt" which also went to number one on Billboard's chart. "Old Flame" and "Cheap Love", the next two singles to be released, peaked at number five and number nine, respectively. "What Can I Do with My Heart", the album's final single release was written by Newton's long-time collaborator Otha Young and also peaked at number nine.

"You Make Me Want to Make You Mine" earned Newton her fifth Grammy Award nomination for Best Female Vocalist. However, she lost to Rosanne Cash's "I Don't Know Why You Don't Want Me" - which was written by Cash in response to losing a Grammy to Newton in 1983.

"Both to Each Other (Friends & Lovers)", a duet by Newton and Eddie Rabbitt, was released as a single in July 1985 and peaked at number one. This song was not included in the original release of Old Flame but was added to the vinyl, cassette, CD reissues.

== Track listing ==
"You Make Me Want to Make You Mine"
The lead-off single for Old Flame topped the Billboard Country chart and garnered Newton her fifth Grammy Award nomination for Best Female Vocalist.

No.	Title	Writer(s)	Length
1.	"Cheap Love"	Del Shannon	3:32
2.	"You Make Me Want to Make You Mine"	Dave Loggins	4:10
3.	"Hurt"	Jimmie Crane; Al Jacobs	3:45
4.	"Old Flame"	Reed Nielsen	3:03
5.	"Stuck in the Middle with You"	Gerry Rafferty; Joe Egan	2:52
6.	"Feel a Whole Lot Better"	Gene Clark	3:31
7.	"What Can I Do with My Heart"	Otha Young	3:37
8.	"With You"	Dean Parks	3:39
9.	"One Touch"	Michael Anderson	3:28
10.	"Let Your Woman Take Care of You"	Don Cook	3:42
11.	"Both to Each Other (Friends & Lovers)" (duet with Eddie Rabbitt) (bonus track on CD reissue)	Jay Gruska; Paul Gordon	3:53
Total length:			39:12

== Personnel ==
Adapted from the AllMusic credits.

- Juice Newton – vocals, guitar
- Andrew Gold – guitar, backing vocals
- Fred Tackett – guitar
- Chuck Martin – guitar, soloist
- George Doering – guitar
- Tom Scott – saxophone, soloist
- Alan Pasqua – organ, synthesizer
- Philip Aaberg – keyboards
- Jim Lang – keyboards
- Gary Durrett – drums, backing vocals
- Rick Shlosser – drums
- Neil Stubenhaus – bass
- Robin Lamble – bass
- Richard Landis – percussion, backing vocals
- Timothy B. Schmit – backing vocals
- Kenny Edwards – backing vocals
- Richard Page – backing vocals
- Beth Andersen – backing vocals
- Jim Haas – backing vocals
- Joe Chemay – backing vocals
- Susan Boyd – backing vocals
- Donna Davidson – backing vocals
- Jon Joyce – backing vocals

== Charts ==
=== Weekly charts ===
Chart (1986)	Peak position
US Top Country Albums (Billboard)	12

=== Year-end charts ===
Chart (1986)	Position
US Top Country Albums (Billboard)	38
