= Love's Been a Little Bit Hard on Me =

1982 single by Juice Newton

Single by Juice Newton

from the album Quiet Lies
- B-side: "Ever True"
- Released: May 22, 1982
- Genre: Pop; country rock
- Length: 3:14
- Label: Capitol
- Songwriter: Gary Burr
- Producer: Richard Landis

Juice Newton singles chronology
"The Sweetest Thing (I've Ever Known)" (1981)	"Love's Been a Little Bit Hard on Me" (1982)	"Break It to Me Gently" (1982)

Music video
- "Love's Been a Little Bit Hard on Me" on YouTube

"Love's Been a Little Bit Hard on Me" is a song written by Gary Burr and recorded by the American country-pop singer Juice Newton for her seventh studio album Quiet Lies (1982). The recording garnered Newton a Grammy nomination for Best Female Vocalist in the Pop category.

== Music video ==
The music video for this song comically plays off the emotional hurt of love by showing Juice Newton being physically injured by her lover in a series of accidents. The final shot is of Newton singing in the hospital in a full-body cast with her broken leg in the air. The video was awarded Video of the Year by the American Video Association in 1982.

== Personnel ==
- Philip Aaberg – keyboards
- Michael Boddicker – synthesizer
- George Doering – guitar
- Steve Forman – percussion
- Andrew Gold – electric guitar and solo, backing vocals
- Chris Montan – backing vocals
- Juice Newton – guitar (uncredited on LP), lead vocals
- Rick Shlosser – drums
- Harry Stinson – backing vocals
- Neil Stubenhaus – bass
- Fred Tackett – acoustic guitar
- Otha Young – electric guitar, backing vocals

== Musical analysis ==
Newton's version is in A major, and uses primarily A, D, and E chords with an occasional F♯ minor. But in the introduction, outro, and interludes between verses, a rarely heard (in popular music) pedal point is used in the bass and rhythm guitars, under changing chords in the upper instruments (A, D, E, A). Also of interest is the use of a descending parallel pattern of the chords D, C♯ minor, B minor, and A in the bridge, which is also atypical of popular music from that era. The second bridge also includes a moment of a capella singing, similar to another Newton favorite, "Queen of Hearts".

== Chart performance ==
"Love's Been a Little Bit Hard on Me" was released as the album's first single in May 1982 and reached number seven on the Billboard Hot 100 that summer. It also charted at number four on the Billboard Adult Contemporary chart and number 30 on the Billboard Country chart. It also performed well in Canada, reaching number three on the Adult Contemporary chart and number 14 on the RPM Top 100 singles chart.

=== Weekly charts ===
Chart (1982)	Peak position
US Billboard Hot 100	7
US Hot Country Songs (Billboard)	30
US Adult Contemporary (Billboard)	4
Canada Country Singles (RPM)	24
Canada Top Singles (RPM)	14
Canada Adult Contemporary (RPM)	3

=== Year-end charts ===
Chart (1982)	Rank
Canada Top Singles (RPM)	71
US Billboard Hot 100	47
US Cash Box	37
