= You Make Me Want to Make You Mine =

Single by Juice Newton

from the album Old Flame
- B-side: "Waiting for the Sun"
- Released: June 1985
- Genre: Country
- Length: 4:10
- Label: RCA
- Songwriter(s): Dave Loggins
- Producer(s): Richard Landis

Juice Newton singles chronology
"Restless Heart" (1984)	"You Make Me Want to Make You Mine" (1985)	"Hurt" (1985)

"You Make Me Want to Make You Mine" is a song written by Dave Loggins, and recorded by American country music artist Juice Newton. It was released in June 1985 as the first single from the album Old Flame. The song was Newton's second number 1 hit on the U.S. Country chart as a solo artist. The single stayed at number 1 for one week and spent a total of thirteen weeks on the country chart. In 1986, the song garnered Newton her fifth "Best Female Vocal Performance" Grammy nomination.

== Charts ==
=== Weekly charts ===
Chart (1985)	Peak position
US Hot Country Songs (Billboard)	1
Canadian RPM Country Tracks	1

=== Year-end charts ===
Chart (1985)	Position
US Hot Country Songs (Billboard)	40
