= Juice Newton =

American pop and country singer (born 1952)

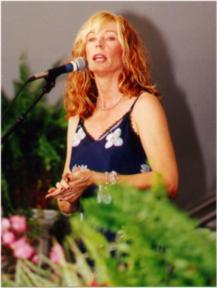
- Newton in 1998
- Born: Judith Kay Newton; February 18, 1952 (age 74); Lakehurst, New Jersey, U.S.
- Education: Foothill College
- Occupations: Singer; songwriter; musician
- Years active: 1975–2020
- Known for: "Angel of the Morning"; "Queen of Hearts"; "The Sweetest Thing (I've Ever Known)"; "Love's Been a Little Bit Hard on Me"; "Break It to Me Gently"; "You Make Me Want to Make You Mine"; "Hurt"
- Musical career
- Genres: Country; pop; rock
- Instruments: Vocals; acoustic guitar; percussion
- Labels: Capitol; RCA
- Website: juicenewtonmusic.com

Juice Newton (born Judith Kay Newton; February 18, 1952) is an American pop and country singer, songwriter, and musician. Newton has received five Grammy Award nominations in the Pop and Country Best Female Vocalist categories – winning once in 1983 – as well as an ACM Award for Top New Female Artist and two consecutive Billboard Female Album Artist of the Year awards. Newton's other awards include a People's Choice Award for "Best Female Vocalist" and the Australian Music Media's "Number One International Country Artist".

Newton has several Gold and Platinum records to her credit, including Juice, Quiet Lies and her first Greatest Hits album. During the 1980s, she charted 14 top 10 hits across the Billboard Country, AC, and Hot 100 charts, with many of the recordings achieving crossover success and six of the songs hitting the No. 1 position.

== Early life and education ==
Newton was born in Lakehurst, New Jersey. She is the daughter of a Navy officer. Her mother encouraged her interest in music, giving her a guitar for her 13th birthday.

After graduating from First Colonial High School in Virginia Beach, Virginia, she attended Foothill College in Los Altos Hills, California. During this time, she performed folk music in some local coffeehouses. She then formed a folk-rock band with guitarist and songwriter Otha Young and toured bars in Northern California with her band.

== Career ==
=== Early music career ===
In the early 1970s, Newton, Otha Young and Tom Kealey formed a band that would eventually be called Juice Newton & Silver Spur, which was signed to RCA Records. The group released two albums for RCA, in 1975 and 1976, but scored only one charting country single with "Love Is a Word". The band was dropped by RCA, then joined Capitol Records in 1977. The band broke up shortly after releasing just one more album.

In late 1977, Newton went solo, continuing to record for Capitol, and until 1982 Silver Spur remained the name of her backing band. Newton also sang backing vocals for three tracks on Bob Welch's platinum solo debut album, including his hit "Ebony Eyes".

Near the end of 1977, "It's a Heartache" became Newton's first solo record and a major hit in Mexico, where it was eventually certified Gold, and in 1978, she released it in the United States. “It’s a Heartache” was the first of Newton's eleven singles to chart on the Billboard Hot 100. Also in 1978, The Carpenters' version of the Newton/Young-penned song "Sweet, Sweet Smile" reached the Top 10 on both the Country and Adult Contemporary charts, and No. 44 on the Billboard Hot 100. In 1978, Newton legally changed her name from "Judy Kay Newton" to "Juice Newton" ("Juice" having long been her nickname).

Newton's solo debut album, Well Kept Secret, was released later in 1978. Neither Well Kept Secret nor its sole single, "Hey Baby", charted, but Capitol Records did renew Newton's contract. In 1979 Capitol's investment in Newton began to pay off as Newton had her first Top-40 Country hit with "Let's Keep It That Way" (another one-off single). Later that year, the album Take Heart featured five modestly charting singles: "Until Tonight", "Any Way That You Want Me", "You Fill My Life", "Lay Back in the Arms of Someone", and "Sunshine". In 1980, "Sunshine" became Newton's second top-40 country chart single, "You Fill My Life" reached No. 41, and "Until Tonight" was No. 42. Both of Newton's initial solo efforts performed with modest success but failed to have lasting impacts on the album charts.

=== Early 1980s pop music success ===
In 1981, Newton's third solo album, simply titled Juice, was released. It spawned three consecutive Top-10 pop hits, namely "Angel of the Morning" (written by Chip Taylor), "Queen of Hearts," and an updated version of "The Sweetest Thing (I've Ever Known)" (the original version had appeared on the Silver Spur debut album), which earned Newton the first of several No. 1 Country chart singles. A fourth single, "Ride 'Em Cowboy", from Juice was released in 1984 to support Newton's first Greatest Hits album, reaching the Billboard Country Top 40 chart.

In 1981, Newton's video for "Angel of the Morning" was the first country-music video to air on MTV, the third by a female solo artist (after videos by Pat Benatar and Carly Simon), and the 40th to air on the channel overall.

Juice sold more than a million copies in the United States and went Triple-Platinum (300,000 copies) in Canada. "Angel of the Morning" and "The Sweetest Thing (I've Ever Known)" each reached No. 1 on the Billboard Adult Contemporary chart, where Newton would chart regularly for the next several years. In 1982, Newton received two Grammy nominations for Best Female Vocalist: one for "Angel of the Morning" in the Pop category, and another for "Queen of Hearts" in Country.

These two singles became her biggest sellers in the United States, each earning an RIAA Gold certification. (In 1981 and 1982, when these singles were certified, the RIAA standard for Gold singles was "more than 1 million copies sold"; in 1989, RIAA lowered the standard to 500,000 for Gold single certifications.) The songs were also sizable hits in Canada, Australia, Germany, the Netherlands, and other countries. For example, "Angel of the Morning" peaked at No. 1 in Canada and No. 43 in the UK Singles Chart in 1981. While "The Sweetest Thing (I've Ever Known)" did not receive a U.S. certification, the song's popularity propelled album sales from Gold to Platinum, and the recording remained in the Top 40 (of the Hot 100) for 18 weeks. "Shot Full Of Love" was released as a single in the UK, but failed to chart.

In the spring of 1982 Newton released her fourth solo album, Quiet Lies, which sold 900,000 copies in the United States. The album went platinum in Canada (100,000 copies). It spawned the Top 10 Pop and Adult Contemporary hit "Love's Been a Little Bit Hard on Me" (which garnered her another Pop Female Vocalist Grammy nomination). "Break It to Me Gently" was the second single and hit No. 1 on the Billboard Adult Contemporary chart, No. 2 on the Billboard Country chart, as well as No. 9 in Cash Box and No. 11 on the Billboard Hot 100. The recording, a contemporary remake of a Brenda Lee hit from the 1960s, won Newton her first Grammy Award for Best Female Country Vocal Performance, beating out contemporaries Dolly Parton, Rosanne Cash, Emmylou Harris and Sylvia. The album's third and final single, "Heart of the Night," reached No. 4 on the Adult Contemporary chart in early 1983 and climbed to No. 25 on the Hot 100.

The album also garnered Newton an award from Australia as the "Top International Country Artist" for the continent. In 1982, Newton toured with country band Alabama on the "Salem Spirit" double-headliner tour. (Various acts opened for Newton and Alabama.)

The direction for Newton's sixth and final Capitol album, 1983's Dirty Looks, was decidedly more rock-oriented and experimental than her usual blending of folk, pop and country styles. The album spawned a moderate-sized hit with "Tell Her No" (Hot 100 No. 27/AC No. 14) and the title track, a rock-edged number that charted low in the Hot 100. The single "Stranger at My Door" had a brief run on the country chart. The album was a moderate success, selling more than 300,000 copies in the United States and going Gold in Canada (50,000 copies). (The song "Dirty Looks" was written by Dave Robbins and Van Stephenson, who would later become part of the Country group Blackhawk in the 1990s. The pair also wrote Newton's 1984 country single "Restless Heart.")

According to a 1984 front-page article in Billboard magazine, changes at Capitol led Newton to return to RCA. The 1984 album Can't Wait All Night continued with a rock-oriented sound. The launch single, "A Little Love," and the title track became Newton's final charting pop singles to date, reaching No. 44 and No. 66, respectively, while "Restless Heart" made No. 57 on the country chart. "A Little Love" became Newton's seventh and final Top-10 hit on Billboard's Adult Contemporary chart, reaching the No. 7 spot. Newton's final double-header "Salem Spirit" tour with Alabama took place during this time, with Bill Medley of The Righteous Brothers as the opening act.

=== From pop to country ===
Newton had always been moderately popular in country music; she responded to her waning popularity in the pop market by targeting her next album, 1985's Old Flame, solely to country audiences. The strategic move was a success; the album revitalized her career, reached No. 12 on the Billboard album chart and featured six Top-10 country hits, including the No. 1s "You Make Me Want to Make You Mine", "Hurt", and "Both to Each Other (Friends and Lovers)" (with Eddie Rabbitt), none of which (unlike her previous efforts) appeared at all on the pop charts. The duet was released to the public before the pop version "Friends and Lovers" by Gloria Loring and Carl Anderson; the pop version was released to radio and stores two weeks after Newton and Rabbitt's version first appeared, even though it was recorded first. Newton's version was originally available only on a special edition of the Old Flame album and on the Eddie Rabbitt album Rabbitt Traxx. The "Old Flame" album produced hit singles for more than sixteen months, with the final release being "What Can I Do with My Heart" (written by Otha Young), which reached the Top 10 in early 1987.

Newton returned to the Top 10 in 1988 with "Tell Me True" from her 1987 album Emotion. The album's lead single, the progressive-country tune "First Time Caller", stalled at No. 24. Her final album of the decade, Ain't Gonna Cry (1989), was not promoted by the label and did not chart. But it did spawn her final Top-40 country hit to date, "When Love Comes Around the Bend", which RCA refused to release as a single because Newton's contract had not been renewed.

After being dropped by RCA Records in 1989 (along with several other country artists, including Dolly Parton and Kenny Rogers, as country music as a whole was about to undergo momentous change), Newton took time to focus on her family life. Newton took a hiatus from recording albums, touring sporadically until returning to the music scene in late 1990s when she released the albums The Trouble with Angels (1998) and American Girl (1999).

=== 1990s to present ===
In 1994, Newton contributed the track "Lovers of One Day" to an Édith Piaf tribute album which also included songs by Pat Benatar and Donna Summer.

In 1995, Newton recorded a double album of pop duets (which was slated to be sold via infomercial), but the project was riddled with legal issues, resulting in a low-impact, "accidental" release of the "Platinum & Gold" series of duets in the early 2000s (the CD set was released without Newton's permission). Subsequently, bootleg CDs including most of the duets turned up on U.S. store shelves as Gold & Platinum, Volumes 7 and 8. Those CDs also contain 1995 solo versions of three of Newton's pop hits: "Angel of the Morning", "Love's Been a Little Bit Hard on Me" and "Queen of Hearts". Newton's duet partners included Willie Nelson, Melissa Manchester, The Pointer Sisters and Frankie Valli. In 1998, Newton released The Trouble with Angels, a collection of seven re-recorded hits and three new songs, including the single "When I Get Over You". The 1998 effort was quickly followed by American Girl in 1999, which was Newton's first album of all-new material since 1989 and featured the single "They Never Made It to Memphis". The collection featured tracks written by Otha Young, Freddie Mercury, Nanci Griffith, Tom Petty and Newton herself.

Every Road Leads Back to You (which consists of live material and a bonus EP of four studio recordings of original songs) was released in 2002 with an accompanying DVD. American Girl Vol. II, which was originally sold exclusively at cdbaby.com and at Newton's live shows, was released in 2003 and reissued in 2006 and again in 2011 by Brookside Records.

In 2005, Newton appeared on the TV show Hit Me, Baby, One More Time, on which she performed a folk-rock rendition of "Pieces Of Me" and a truncated version of "Queen of Hearts"; online voters selected Newton's performance as their favorite of the five acts that appeared on the episode. In the mid-2000s, Newton also contributed tracks to the albums An All-Star Tribute To Cher ("Reason to Believe") and An All-Star Tribute to Shania Twain ("Come On Over").

On November 15, 2007, Newton released The Gift of Christmas, her first Christmas album. The 12-song album includes a new version of Newton's "Christmas Needs Love to Be Christmas" and "Mary's Boy Child", as well as a special Christmas version of "For Believers", an Otha Young-penned song first recorded in 1983 for the Dirty Looks album.

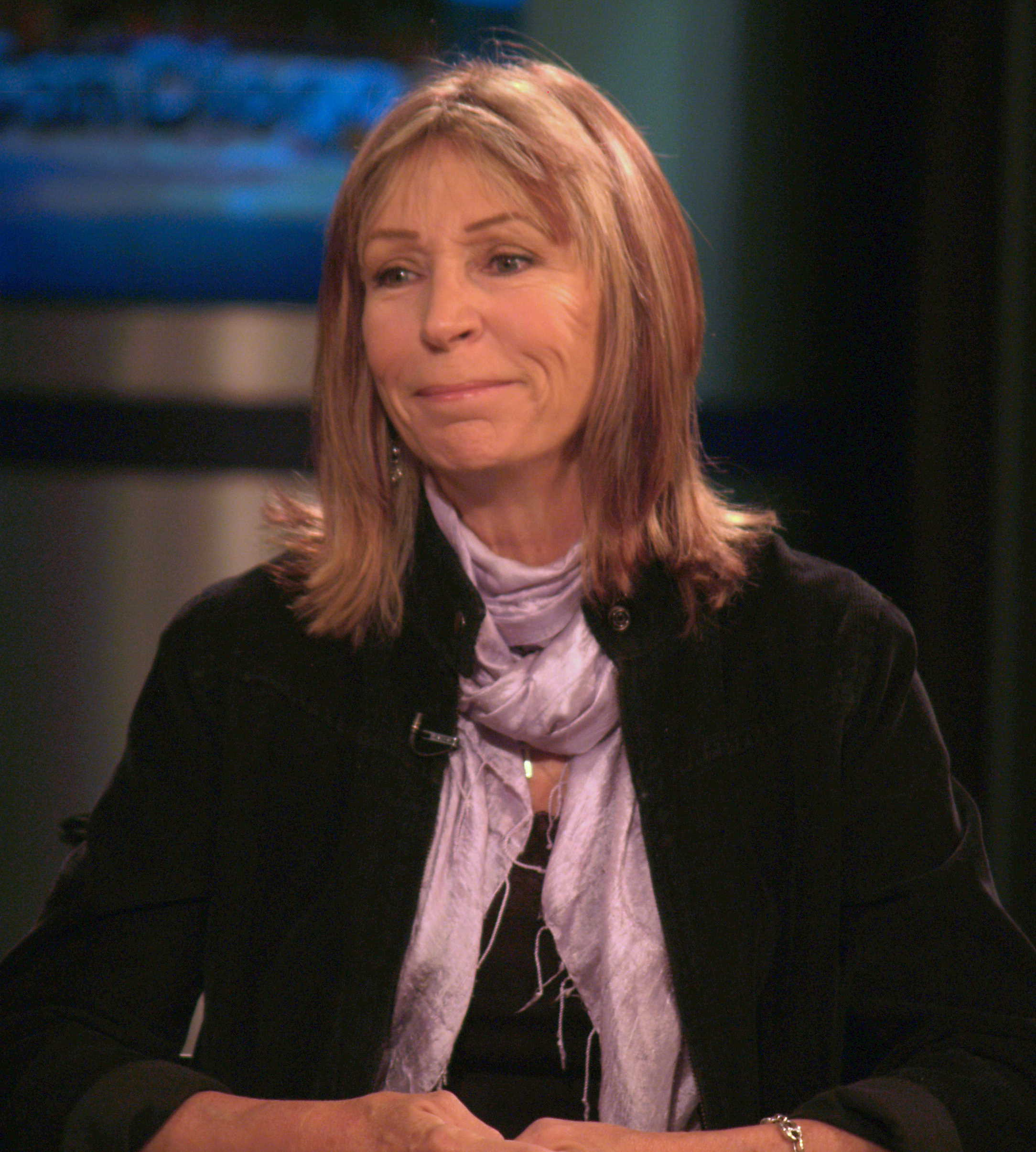
Juice Newton, San Diego, 2009

On August 6, 2009, Newton's longtime musical partner Otha Young died of cancer. The pair worked together for 37 years.

In 2010, Newton's Duets: Friends & Memories album was released by Fuel 2000. The album contained duets performed with Willie Nelson, Melissa Manchester, Frankie Valli and others. One single ("Funny How Time Slips Away") was released.

In 2011, Fuel 2000 released Juice Newton: The Ultimate Hits Collection, which included her own version of the Carpenters' 1978 hit "Sweet Sweet Smile", which Newton and Otha Young wrote in the '70s.

In 2012, BGO Records issued a two-CD set containing Newton's three 1970s Capitol albums: Come To Me, Well Kept Secret and Take Heart. This marked the first time these albums have been available in the CD format. With the release of this set, all Newton's 17 studio albums have been issued on CD.

In the 2016 film Deadpool, Newton's version of "Angel of the Morning" was used for the opening credits montage. As a result, the track re-charted on the Billboard Country chart, reaching No. 43, and also hit No. 3 on Spotify's World Music chart. In 2020, Newton's version of "Angel of the Morning" was featured in the film Promising Young Woman.

== Personal life ==
Newton bought a thoroughbred gelding named Puppy in 1983 and stabled him at the Los Angeles Equestrian Center. The center's manager was polo star and coach Tom Goodspeed. Newton married Goodspeed in 1985. They have two children: Jessica and Tyler.

Besides continuing in the music business, Newton works as a horse trader, dealing mostly in European breeds. She also played polo herself.

== Discography ==
=== Studio albums ===
- Juice Newton & Silver Spur (1975)
- After the Dust Settles (1976)
- Come to Me (1977)
- Well Kept Secret (1978)
- Take Heart (1979)
- Juice (1981)
- Quiet Lies (1982)
- Dirty Looks (1983)
- Can't Wait All Night (1984)
- Old Flame (1985)
- Emotion (1987)
- Ain't Gonna Cry (1989)
- The Trouble with Angels (1998)
- American Girl (1999)
- The Gift of Christmas (2007)
- Duets: Friends & Memories (2010)
