= Quiet Lies =

1982 album by Juice Newton

Studio album by Juice Newton
- Released: May 10, 1982
- Recorded: January – March 1982
- Genre: Country rock
- Label: Capitol
- Producer: Richard Landis

Juice Newton chronology
Juice (1981)	Quiet Lies (1982)	Dirty Looks (1983)

Quiet Lies is the seventh studio album by American country pop artist Juice Newton, released in 1982. It reached number 20 on the Billboard 200, her highest position on the chart, and included three major hits: "Love's Been a Little Bit Hard on Me", "Break It to Me Gently", and "Heart of the Night". Quiet Lies sold more than 900,000 copies in the United States in 1982 (earning Newton her fourth RIAA Gold certification) and was re-issued on CD in 1990 and 2006.

== Hits ==
"Love's Been a Little Bit Hard on Me" was the first single released from the 1982 album, for which Newton received a "Best Female Vocalist – Pop" Grammy nomination. The video for this song received the "Video of the Year" award from the American Video Association. The song reached the top 10 of the Billboard Hot 100 and Adult Contemporary charts. It peaked at number 30 on the Country chart.

The album's second single—"Break It to Me Gently" (originally a 1962 hit for Brenda Lee)—won Juice Newton her first Grammy in 1983, in the category of "Best Female Vocalist - Country". The song hit number one on the adult contemporary chart, number two on the country chart, and number 11 on the Hot 100. "Heart of the Night", written by John Bettis and Michael Clark, was the opening track for the album. It was released as the third and final single, reaching number four on the adult contemporary chart and 25 on the Billboard Hot 100 in February 1983.

== Track listing ==
Side one
No.	Title	Writer(s)	Length
1.	"Heart of the Night"	John Bettis, Michael Clark	4:06
2.	"Love's Been a Little Bit Hard on Me"	Gary Burr	3:12
3.	"Break It to Me Gently"	Joe Seneca, Diane Lambert	4:04
4.	"Love Sail Away"	Otha Young	3:28
5.	"I'm Dancing as Fast as I Can"	Bob McDill	3:52

Side two
No.	Title	Writer(s)	Length
1.	"I'm Gonna Be Strong"	Barry Mann, Cynthia Weil	3:36
2.	"Trail of Tears"	Allen Reynolds, Roger Cook	2:56
3.	"Adiós Mi Corazón"	Young	4:08
4.	"Falling in Love"	Holyfield, McDill	3:28
5.	"Ever True"	Young	4:02

== Personnel ==
=== Musicians ===
- Juice Newton – lead vocals, backing vocals (2, 8)
- Philip Aaberg – keyboards (1, 2, 4–7, 9, 10), synthesizers (4)
- Michael Boddicker – synthesizers (1, 2, 3)
- Richard Tee – keyboards (3)
- George Doering – electric guitar (1–8), guitar solo (1, 6, 8), acoustic guitar (9, 10)
- Fred Tackett – acoustic guitar
- Andrew Gold – guitar (2), guitar solo (2), backing vocals (2, 4, 6–10)
- Chuck Martin – electric guitar (3, 7), guitar solo (3, 7)
- Doug Livingston – pedal steel guitar (9, 10)
- Neil Stubenhaus – bass (1, 2, 4–10)
- Rick Shlosser – drums (1, 2, 3, 7)
- Vinnie Colaiuta – drums (4, 5, 6, 8, 9, 10)
- Steve Forman – percussion (1, 2, 6, 7, 9), Jew's harp (9)
- David Landis – percussion (4)
- Emil Richards – vibraphone (6), chimes (6)
- David Boruff – saxophone (7)
- Jim Horn – saxophone (7)
- Kim Hutchcroft – saxophone (7)
- Tom Scott – saxophone (7)
- Charlie Calello – arrangements
- Joe Chemay – backing vocals (1)
- Steve George – backing vocals (1)
- Jim Haas – backing vocals (1)
- George Hawkins – backing vocals (1), bass (3)
- Jon Joyce – backing vocals (1)
- Richard Page – backing vocals (1)
- Otha Young – backing vocals (1, 2, 4, 8), electric guitar (2, 4), acoustic guitar (8)
- Chris Montan – backing vocals (2, 4, 6–10)
- Harry Stinson – backing vocals (2, 4, 6–10)

=== Production ===
- Richard Landis – producer, management
- Otha Young – associate producer
- Joe Chiccarelli – recording
- Peter Granet – recording
- Ed Thacker – mixing
- Mitch Gibson – recording assistant, mix assistant
- Paul Ray – recording assistant
- Mark Sackett – recording assistant
- Bob Ludwig – mastering
- Kathy Anaya – production coordinator
- Roy Kohara – art direction
- Henry Marquez – art direction
- Charles Bush – photography

== Charts ==
Weekly chart performance for Quiet Lies
Chart (1982)	Peak position
Canada Top Albums/CDs (RPM)	36
US Billboard 200	20
US Top Country Albums (Billboard)	7

== Certifications ==
Certifications for Quiet Lies
Region	Certification	Certified units/sales
United States (RIAA)	Gold	500,000^{^}
^{^} Shipments figures based on certification alone.
