= Juice (Juice Newton album) =

Studio album by Juice Newton
- Released: February 1981
- Recorded: September – November 1980
- Genres: Country pop; country rock
- Length: 34:42
- Label: Capitol
- Producer: Richard Landis

Juice Newton chronology
Take Heart (1979)	Juice (1981)	Quiet Lies (1982)

Singles from Juice
- 1. "Angel of the Morning" Released: February 1981; 2. "Queen of Hearts" Released: June 8, 1981; 3. "The Sweetest Thing (I've Ever Known)" Released: October 24, 1981

Professional ratings
Review scores
Source	Rating
AllMusic	4.5/5 stars

Juice is the sixth studio album and third solo album by American country rock singer Juice Newton. The album was released in February 1981 by Capitol Records and was her first major success.

== Hits ==
"Angel of the Morning"
Newton covered the 1968 Merrilee Rush hit at the suggestion of Steve Meyer, who promoted Capitol Records product to radio stations and felt it would be a strong candidate to attain airplay for Newton.

The album features two #1 hits, "Angel of the Morning" and "The Sweetest Thing (I've Ever Known)". It also contains "Queen of Hearts," the biggest single of Juice Newton's career, which peaked at #2 on both the Billboard Hot 100 and Adult Contemporary charts ("Endless Love" by Diana Ross and Lionel Richie prevented the song from reaching #1). "Queen of Hearts" was a popular music video during the summer of MTV's debut. Newton would go on to have more hit songs and albums, but this remains the album for which she is best known.

In 1984, a fourth track from Juice, titled "Ride 'Em Cowboy", was released in support of Newton's first Greatest Hits album. The single reached #32 on the Billboard Hot Country Singles chart.

Two versions of the album exist. Early releases feature the original pedal steel guitar-heavy country version of "The Sweetest Thing (I've Ever Known)," subsequently replaced by the more pop-friendly remix that was issued as a single. Early editions have Newton's name in blue outlined letters on the front of the jacket. Later editions with this remix have the artists name with the lettering filled in with cream or off white.

== Awards ==
Juice garnered Newton two "Best Female Vocalist" Grammy Award nominations (in the pop and country categories, respectively). She lost out to Lena Horne and Dolly Parton but won a Grammy for her follow-up studio album Quiet Lies (1982).

== Track listing ==
Side one
No.	Title	Writer(s)	Length
1.	"Angel of the Morning"	Chip Taylor	4:10
2.	"Shot Full of Love"	Bob McDill	3:22
3.	"Ride 'Em Cowboy"	Paul Davis	3:30
4.	"Queen of Hearts"	Hank DeVito	3:26
5.	"River of Love"	Juice Newton; Otha Young	2:53

Side two
No.	Title	Writer(s)	Length
6.	"All I Have to Do Is Dream"	Boudleaux Bryant	3:10
7.	"Headin' for a Heartache"	Byron Hill; J. Remington Wilde	2:46
8.	"Country Comfort"	Elton John; Bernie Taupin	4:17
9.	"Texas Heartache"	Keith Stegall; Chris Waters	2:59
10.	"The Sweetest Thing (I've Ever Known)"	Young	4:04
Total length:			34:42

== Personnel ==
- Juice Newton – acoustic guitar, lead vocals, backing vocals
- Chuck Martin, George Doering, Mitch Holder, Otha Young, Tim May – electric guitar
- Billy Joe Walker Jr., Dennis Budimir, Fred Tackett – acoustic guitar
- Dan Dugmore, Doug Livingston, Jay Dee Maness – pedal steel guitar
- Philip Aaberg – keyboards
- Neil Stubenhaus, Scott Chambers – bass
- Rick Shlosser – drums
- Steve Forman – percussion
- Brad Felton – banjo
- Andrew Gold, Brock Walsh, Harry Stinson, Jim Haas, Jon Joyce, Kenny Edwards, Lewis Morford, Stan Farber – backing vocals
- Frank DeCaro - music contractor

== Production ==
- Produced by Richard Landis
- Associate producer: Otha Young
- Engineered by Joe Chiccarelli
- Assistant engineers: David Cole, Hugh Davies, Mitch Gibson, Karen Siegel
- Mixing: Michael Verdick
- Mastering: Wally Traugott

== Chart performance ==
Chart (1981)	Peak position
U.S. Billboard Top LPs	22
U.S. Billboard Top Country Albums	4
Australia (Kent Music Report)	46
Canadian RPM Top Albums	16

Year End Chart (1981)	Peak position
U.S. Billboard Top LPs	24
U.S. Billboard Top Country Albums	18

Year End Chart (1982)	Peak position
U.S. Billboard Top LPs	33
U.S. Billboard Top Country Albums	15

=== Charting Singles ===
Single	Peak chart positions							
Single	US Country	US	US AC	CAN Country	CAN	CAN AC	NZ	AUS
"Angel of the Morning"^{[A]}	22	4	1	21	1	6	5	2
"Queen of Hearts"	14	2	2	6	8	3	7	8
"The Sweetest Thing (I've Ever Known)"	1	7	1	1	25	1	—	—

== Certifications ==
Organization	Level	Date
RIAA – USA	Platinum	January 5, 1982
