= Break It to Me Gently =

1961 song written by Joe Seneca and Diane Lampert

Single by Brenda Lee

from the album ..."Let Me Sing"
- B-side: "So Deep"
- Released: January 8, 1962
- Recorded: August 31, 1961
- Studio: Bradley Studios (Nashville, Tennessee)
- Genre: Vocal, country
- Length: 2:34
- Label: Decca 31348
- Songwriters: Joe Seneca, Diane Lampert
- Producer: Owen Bradley

Brenda Lee singles chronology
"Fool #1" (1961)	"Break It to Me Gently" (1962)	"Speak to Me Pretty" (1962)

"Break It to Me Gently" is a pop song written by blues musician Joe Seneca with lyrics by Diane Lampert. Both Brenda Lee and Juice Newton were met with considerable success with their versions of the song.

Brenda Lee recorded "Break It to Me Gently" on August 31, 1961, with Owen Bradley producing the session at his Bradley Film and Recording Studio in Nashville, after another track from the same sessions, "Fool #1", which became a top 10 hit. "Break It To Me Gently" was released as a single at the end of 1961 and reached number four on the US Billboard Hot 100 in January 1962. In 2008, the Brenda Lee version of the song was featured at the closing of season 2, episode 7 of the AMC series Mad Men. Lee's "Break It to Me Gently" is on the track list of the CD Pan Am: Music From and Inspired By the Original Series set for release January 17, 2012.

== Juice Newton version ==
"Break It to Me Gently"

Single by Juice Newton

from the album Quiet Lies
- B-side: "Adios Mi Corazon"
- Released: August 1982
- Genre: Vocal, country
- Length: 4:04
- Label: Capitol
- Songwriters: Joe Seneca, Diane Lampert
- Producer: Richard Landis

Juice Newton singles chronology
"Love's Been a Little Bit Hard on Me" (1982)	"Break It to Me Gently" (1982)	"Heart of the Night" (1983)

Juice Newton had included "Break It to Me Gently" in the set list for her 1981 national tour: New York Times music critic Stephen Holden terming Newton's "steamy version" of the song the concert's highlight. Newton made her recording of the song at Soundcastle Studio in Hollywood, California on January 11, 1982: this was the first session of recording the tracks which would compose Newton's Quiet Lies album whose lead single: "Love's Been a Little Bit Hard on Me" was the one other track recorded in that session. Issued as the second single from Quiet Lies in August 1982, "Break It to Me Gently" just missed becoming Newton's fifth consecutive Top Ten hit on the Billboard Hot 100 peaking at number 11 that October. The track reached number one on the US Adult Contemporary chart (making it Newton's third number one on that chart), and number two on the US country singles chart. Newton won the Grammy Award for Best Country Vocal Performance, Female, for her performance of the song. Newton would score two more Top 40 pop hits and numerous Top 40 country hits after "Break It to Me Gently".

== Personnel ==
- Juice Newton: lead vocals
- Chuck Martin: electric guitar and solo
- George Doering: electric guitar
- Fred Tackett: acoustic guitar
- Richard Tee: keyboards
- Michael Boddicker: synthesizer
- George Hawkins: bass
- Rick Shlosser: drums

== Chart performance ==
=== Weekly charts ===
Brenda Lee

Chart (1962)	Peak position
Australia (Kent Music Report)	10
Canada (CHUM Hit Parade)	3
New Zealand (Lever Hit Parade)	8
UK Singles (OCC)	46
U.S. Billboard Hot 100	4
US Cash Box Top 100	6

=== Year-end charts ===
Chart (1962)	Rank
U.S. Billboard Hot 100	26
U.S. Cash Box	66

Juice Newton

Chart (1982)	Peak position
Canadian RPM Country Tracks	2
Canadian RPM Adult Contemporary Tracks	1
US Hot Country Songs (Billboard)	2
US Billboard Hot 100	11
US Adult Contemporary (Billboard)	1
U.S. Cash Box Top 100	9

Chart (1982)	Rank
U.S. (Joel Whitburn's Pop Annual)	73
U.S. Cash Box	58

== Johnny Hallyday version (in French) ==
"Quitte-moi doucement"

Single by Johnny Hallyday

from the album Da dou ron ron
- Language: French
- English title: Leave me gently
- A-side: "Quand Ce Jour-Là Viendra"
- Released: May 10, 1963
- Genre: Pop, rock
- Length: 2:30
- Label: Philips
- Producers: Shelby Singleton, Lee Hallyday

Johnny Hallyday singles chronology
"Tes tendres années" (1963)	"Les Bras en croix" / "Quitte-moi doucement" / "Quand un air vous possède" / "Quitte-moi doucement" / "Quand un air vous possède" / "Dis-moi oui" (1963)	"Da dou ron ron" (1964)

The French rendering "Quitte-moi doucement" (meaning "Leave me gently") was recorded by French rocker Johnny Hallyday in 1963 and released in May that year. Later that same year, the song was featured on Hallyday's 1963 studio album "Da dou ron ron" 4 months later.

=== Track listings ===
7-inch EP Philips 432.908 BE (1963, France, Spain, etc.)

A1. "Les bras en croix" (2:13)
A2. "Quitte-moi doucement" ("Break It to Me Gently") (2:30)
B1. "Quand un air vous possède" ("When My Little Girl Is Smiling") (2:17)
B2. "Dis-moi oui" ("We Say Yeah") (2:07)

7-inch single "Ma guitare / Quitte-moi doucement" Philips JF 328 009 (1963, Netherlands)

A. "Ma guitare" (1:50)
AA. "Quitte-moi doucement" (2:15)

== Other cover versions ==
"Break It to Me Gently" has also been recorded by Ruth Brown, Linda Martin, Lorrie Morgan, Bobby Rydell and Guy Lombardo.

An alternate French rendering, "Brise doucement notre amour", was recorded by Québécois singer Michèle Richard (fr). Deana Martin recorded "Break It To Me Gently" on her 2013 album Destination Moon. In 2016, Aubrey Peeples performed the song at the Grand Ole Opry.

== See also ==
- List of number-one adult contemporary singles of 1982 (U.S.)
