= Queen of Hearts (Hank DeVito song) =

Song written by Hank DeVito

- UK single

Single by Dave Edmunds

from the album Repeat When Necessary
- B-side: "The Creature from the Black Lagoon"
- Released: September 16, 1979
- Recorded: 1979
- Genre: Country pop; country rock
- Length: 3:17
- Label: Swan Song
- Songwriter: Hank DeVito
- Producer: Dave Edmunds

Dave Edmunds singles chronology
"Girls Talk" (1979)	"Queen of Hearts" (1979)	"Crawling from the Wreckage" (1979)

Official audio
- "Queen of Hearts" on YouTube

"Queen of Hearts" is a country-pop song written by Hank DeVito, the pedal steel guitarist in Emmylou Harris's backing group The Hot Band. It was first recorded by Dave Edmunds on his 1979 album Repeat When Necessary. Edmunds' version was released as a single and reached number 11 in the UK and number 12 in Ireland that year, but failed to chart substantially elsewhere in the world. The most successful version of the song was recorded by Juice Newton in 1981. Her version reached number two in the US and South Africa and the top 10 in Canada, Australia, Denmark, Switzerland and New Zealand.

== Dave Edmunds version ==
British new wave and neo-rockabilly artist Dave Edmunds released the first recording of "Queen of Hearts" for his 1979 album Repeat When Necessary. The song came out as a single in the UK and was a hit there, reaching number 11. Edmunds wanted to have the single released in the US, but his label never released it: "I was just waiting for Swan Song, in their wisdom, to put it out in America, which they didn't do. ... Eventually, Juice Newton did it with an almost identical version and had a huge hit with it."

Following the Newton version, Edmunds felt uncomfortable performing the song live because now it was associated primarily with Newton. He commented, "What bugged me is that I can't do it live now. 'Because to people it looks like, 'What's he doing a Juice Newton song for?' you know, but it's my song. Maybe now I could, but at the time, when it was a hit, I felt you would feel kinda weird about doing it, 'cuz there's no reason US audiences would know anything about my version of the song". In 1986, a live version by Dave Edmunds appeared on his album I Hear You Rockin'.

Edmunds' version has seen a positive reception from critics. AllMusic named it one of the four "classics" on Repeat When Necessary, while Ultimate Classic Rock named it a "highlight" of the album. Trouser Press similarly named it a "standout".

=== Chart history ===
Chart (1979–80)	Peak position
Australia (Kent Music Report)	59
Ireland (IRMA)	12
UK Singles Chart	11

== Juice Newton version ==
"Queen of Hearts"
- Standard picture sleeve

Single by Juice Newton

from the album Juice
- B-side: "River of Love"
- Released: June 8, 1981
- Recorded: 1981
- Genre: Country pop
- Length: 3:26
- Label: Capitol
- Songwriter: Hank DeVito
- Producer: Richard Landis

Juice Newton singles chronology
"Angel of the Morning" (1981)	"Queen of Hearts" (1981)	"The Sweetest Thing (I've Ever Known)" (1982)

Following an appearance on the 1980 Rodney Crowell album But What Will the Neighbors Think, on which composer DeVito played guitar, "Queen of Hearts" had its highest-profile rendition in a version by country-rock singer Juice Newton from the 1981 album Juice. Newton would later recall: "I did ['Queen of Hearts'] live for about a year...Then I brought it to [producer] Richard Landis when we started the Juice album. He wasn't convinced at that point that it was a breakout song but I told him I think this is a real cool song … so we cut it". Newton's own favorite cut on the Juice album, "Queen of Hearts" was issued as the album's second single and would reach number two on the Billboard Hot 100 for two weeks in September 1981. While still at number two, "Queen of Hearts" was certified Gold for domestic sales of one million units.

"Queen of Hearts" also gave Newton her second huge international hit, with top 10 chart positions in Australia, Canada, New Zealand, South Africa, and Switzerland, and more moderate success in Austria, Germany, and the Netherlands. Her recording of the song earned Newton a 1982 Grammy nomination for Best Female Vocalist, Country and Western category, "Queen of Hearts" having been a number 14 country hit. In June 2014, Newton's version of the song was ranked number 92 by Rolling Stone on its list of the 100 greatest country songs of all time.

Newton re-recorded "Queen of Hearts" for her 1998 album The Trouble With Angels.

=== Chart history ===
==== Weekly charts ====
Chart (1981)	Peak position
Argentina (CAPIF)	10
Australia (Kent Music Report)	8
Austria	13
Belgium	18
Canadian RPM Top Singles	8
Canadian RPM Country Tracks	6
Canadian RPM Adult Contemporary Tracks	3
Denmark	6
Germany	39
Israel (IBA)	13
New Zealand (RIANZ)	7
Netherlands	27
South Africa (Springbok)	2
Switzerland	6
UK Singles (Record Business)	73
US Billboard Hot 100	2
US Hot Country Songs (Billboard)	14
US Billboard Adult Contemporary	2
US Cash Box Top 100	2

==== Year-end charts ====
Chart (1981)	Rank
Australia (Kent Music Report)	63
Canada RPM Top Singles	52
US Billboard Hot 100	14
US Cash Box Top 100	7

== Covers ==
In 1982, Austrian artist Nickerbocker (de) released the German rendering "Puppe (du bist a moderne Hex')" ("Doll (You're a Modern Witch)") which reached number three in Austria.

In 1982, Scottish country singer Ruby Rendall recorded her version for Attic Records, a record company based in her native Orkney Islands. This recording was the first track on her debut studio album, Ruby Red Wine (catalogue code AT 001). Rendall’s cover of “Queen of Hearts” is essentially a cover of Juice Newton’s version.
