= The Sweetest Thing (I've Ever Known) =

- US single picture sleeve

Single by Juice Newton

from the album Juice
- B-side: "Ride 'Em Cowboy"
- Released: October 24, 1981
- Recorded: 1981
- Genre: Country, pop
- Length: 4:06; 3:58 (7")
- Label: Capitol
- Songwriter: Otha Young
- Producer: Richard Landis

Juice Newton singles chronology
"Queen of Hearts" (1981)	"The Sweetest Thing (I've Ever Known)" (1981)	"Love's Been a Little Bit Hard on Me" (1982)

"The Sweetest Thing (I've Ever Known)" is a country-pop song written by Otha Young for Juice Newton in the mid-1970s. Newton was known for charting hits on the Hot 100, Adult Contemporary, and Hot Country charts - and this song has the distinction of being the only single of hers to reach the top 10 on all three of those charts, peaking at #1 on both the Adult Contemporary and the Hot Country charts.

== History ==
"The Sweetest Thing (I've Ever Known)" was originally recorded and released in 1975 on Juice Newton & Silver Spur's debut album, Juice Newton and Silver Spur (RCA). The 1975 version was not issued as a single, although it was the B-side of two official singles and was issued as a promotional single to U.S. radio stations. In the meantime, Dottsy recorded a version in 1976 and took it to No. 86 on the country music charts and used it as the title track to her album The Sweetest Thing.

After becoming a solo artist, Newton re-recorded the song for her 1981 album, the star-making Juice, which was Newton's third solo album and featured three of her biggest pop hits: "The Sweetest Thing (I've Ever Known)", "Angel of the Morning" and "Queen of Hearts".

In early 1982, "The Sweetest Thing (I've Ever Known)" reached No. 1 on the Billboard adult contemporary chart, No. 1 on the Billboard country chart, and No. 7 on the Billboard pop chart, where it remained in the Top 40 for eighteen weeks. The single is the only of Juice Newton's to reach the Top 10 on all three charts. On Billboard's year-end Top 40 chart, the song charted at No. 21 of all the singles of 1982. The music video for the song was filmed in New York City.

The first pressings of the Juice album featured a different arrangement of the song, with a more prominent steel guitar part and no oboe. After the unexpected crossover success of "Angel of the Morning" and "Queen of Hearts", a pop version was mixed and replaced the country version on all future pressings of the album. The revamped version was also used for the single (which, somewhat ironically, became her first No. 1 Country Single). The 1981 country version can be found on the United Kingdom best-of CD Country Classics and BGO's two-CD "Juice/Quiet Lies/Dirty Looks" boxed set.

== Charts ==
=== Weekly charts ===
==== Dottsy version ====
Chart (1976)	Peak position
US Hot Country Songs (Billboard)	86

==== Juice Newton version ====
Chart (1981–1982)	Peak position
US Billboard Hot 100	7
US Adult Contemporary (Billboard)	1
US Hot Country Songs (Billboard)	1
US Cash Box Top 100	5
Canadian RPM Top Singles	25
Canadian RPM Adult Contemporary Tracks	1
Canadian RPM Country Tracks	1
South Africa (Springbok)	18

=== Year-end charts ===
Chart (1982)	Position
US Billboard Hot 100	21
US Adult Contemporary (Billboard)	17
US Hot Country Songs (Billboard)	26
US Cash Box Top 100	54
