= Otha Young =

American singer-songwriter

Otha Young (a.k.a. Robert Otha Young) (May 10, 1943 – August 6, 2009) was an American singer, songwriter, guitarist, producer and the longtime musical partner of country-pop artist Juice Newton.

Otha was born on May 10, 1943, in Tulare, Tulare County, California.

In the early 1970s, Young and Newton began performing together and formed the band Juice Newton and Silver Spur in Los Gatos, California. They headlined at Mountain Charlie's in Los Gatos and other steak & lobster joints around the San Francisco Bay Area, including the Rusty Pelican in Oakland. Later they decided to make a career move by playing the Rusty Pelican in Newport Beach. By 1978, the band evolved into Newton's solo act, with Young writing, playing and producing for Newton regularly until his death, although other artists recorded Young's songs as well.

As a songwriter, Young was best known for Juice Newton's #1 hit from 1982, "The Sweetest Thing (I've Ever Known)", which reached the top spot on both Billboard's "Adult Contemporary" and "Hot Country" charts, as well as reaching #7 on the Hot 100, remaining in the Top 40 for 18 weeks. According to Billboard, the song was #21 of 1982's Hot 100 biggest hits.

Other Otha Young-penned Top-10 hits include "Sweet, Sweet Smile" (The Carpenters, 1978), "Don't You" (Forester Sisters, 1987) and "What Can I Do With My Heart?" (Juice Newton, 1987).

== Death ==
Otha Young died on August 6, 2009, at Ronald Reagan UCLA Medical Center from lung cancer. He was 66 years old. Otha is survived by his wife, Brenda, and their daughter, Makena.
