= Two Steps Forward =

2017 novel by Graeme Simsion and Anne Buist

- First Edition Cover (Australia)
- Authors: Graeme Simsion and Anne Buist
- Genre: Contemporary fiction
- Publisher: Text Publishing
- Publication date: 2 October 2017
- Publication place: Australia
- Media type: Print, e-book, audio-book
- Pages: 356
- ISBN: 9781925498776
- Preceded by: The Best of Adam Sharp (Simsion); Dangerous to Know (Buist)

Two Steps Forward is a 2017 novel by Australian husband and wife novelists Graeme Simsion and Anne Buist. The work was first published on October 2, 2017 in Australia and New Zealand by Text Publishing. The novel follows two dissimilar people, Zoe and Martin, as their paths cross during a 2000 kilometre walk on the Camino de Santiago.

== Synopsis ==
Zoe Witt is an American artist with new-age views, who makes a spontaneous decision to walk the Chemin de St Jacques / Camino de Santiago de Compostela from Cluny in central France following the sudden death of her husband. Martin Eden is a British Engineer who is making the same journey to prove the design of a cart which he has invented as an alternative to backpacks. The two undertake the walk, dealing with the physical (and, in Zoe’s case, financial) challenges. They frequently encounter each other and begin a romantic relationship, but need to resolve personal issues before it can develop. Only after the walk ends does Martin travel to the USA to indicate his interest in pursuing the relationship.

== Setting and route ==
The protagonists’ route to Santiago begins in Cluny, France and follows the Chemin de Cluny before joining the Chemin du Puy (Via Podiensis) to St Jean Pied de Port, France, the starting point of the popular Camino Frances (French Way). They then follow the GR10 walking path along the Pyrenees to Hendaye, France, where they take the Camino del Norte and then the Camino Primitivo, joining the Camino Frances at Melide. The total journey takes them approximately 90 days. The book’s appendix notes that the authors walked this route together in 2011 in 87 days, covering a little over 2,000 kilometres.

== Structure and genre ==
Two Steps Forward is written in alternating chapters: odd-numbered chapters are narrated by Zoe and even-numbered chapters by Martin. The authors state that they originally wrote the story as two separate novels, one in each voice (Buist wrote Zoe and Simsion wrote Martin), which they then combined. The story is structured as two hero’s journeys with a romantic comedy subplot.

== Film ==
Fox Searchlight Pictures optioned the film rights to Two Steps Forward in August 2017, two months prior to the publication of the book, with Ellen DeGeneres and Jeff Kleeman to produce through their company A Very Good Production. As of 2026, the status of the film remains unknown.

== Reception ==
Books and Publishing called it ‘a feel-good, mature romance that explores what we need to let go of to move forward’. The Herald Sun praised it as a ‘delightful tale of renewal and shedding unnecessary burdens’. Both reviewers noted that it would appeal to fans of Simsion’s The Rosie Project. The Sydney Morning Herald described it as ‘compelling reading’ and ‘entertaining and refreshingly unpredictable’.
