= Angel of the Morning =

1967 song by Chip Taylor

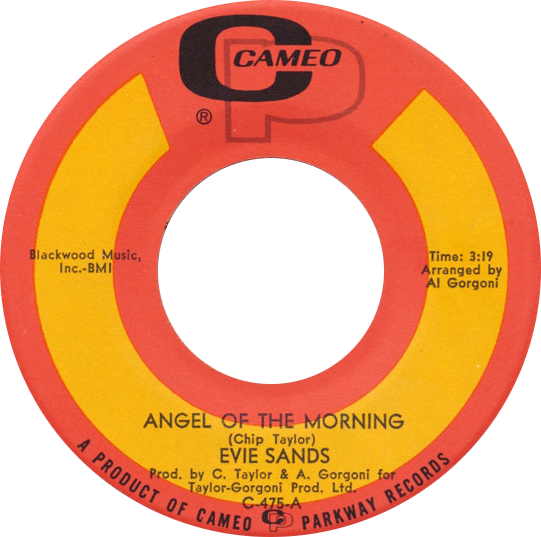
- US face label

Single by Evie Sands
- B-side: "Dear John"
- Released: c. June 1967
- Genre: Pop; folk rock
- Length: 3:19
- Label: Cameo
- Songwriter: Chip Taylor
- Producers: Chip Taylor; Al Gorgoni

Evie Sands singles chronology
"The Love of a Boy" (1966)	"Angel of the Morning" (1967)	"Billy Sunshine" (1967)

"Angel of the Morning" is a popular song written by Chip Taylor, originally recorded by Evie Sands but which first charted with a version by Merrilee Rush. The song has been covered by many artists including Shaggy, Chrissie Hynde, Dusty Springfield, P. P. Arnold, Connie Eaton, Mary Mason, Guys 'n' Dolls, Melba Montgomery, Olivia Newton-John and Juice Newton, who reached the Billboard Hot 100 top ten with her version in 1981.

== Origin and early recordings ==
The song was composed in 1967 by Chip Taylor, who said of it: "I wrote 'Angel of the Morning' after hearing the Rolling Stones song 'Ruby Tuesday' on the car radio when I was driving into New York City. I wanted to capture that kind of passion."

"Angel of the Morning" was originally offered to Connie Francis, but she turned it down because she thought that the lyrical message—the morning after a one-night stand—was too risqué for her image. Taylor produced the first recording of the song with Evie Sands, but the financial straits of Cameo-Parkway Records, which had Sands on their roster, led to a highly limited single release and no promotion.

The second recording was by UK vocalist Billie Davis, made in 1967 by Danny Michaels for Lee Hazlewood's LHI label; however, this version failed to make an impact. Davis' version was later included on her 1970 debut album Billie Davis. P. P. Arnold provided backup vocals for that version and later released a version herself on her 1968 album Kafunta.

== Merrilee Rush version ==
"Angel of the Morning"
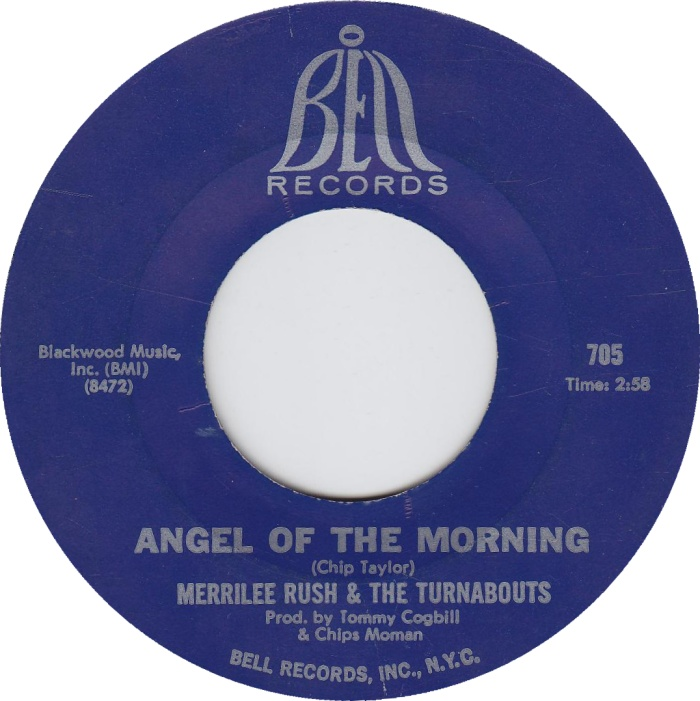
- A-side label of U.S. single

Single by Merrilee Rush & the Turnabouts

from the album Angel of the Morning
- B-side: "Reap What You Sow"
- Released: February 7, 1968
- Recorded: January 1968
- Studio: American (Memphis, Tennessee)
- Genre: Pop; country
- Length: 2:58
- Label: Bell
- Songwriter: Chip Taylor
- Producers: Tommy Cogbill; Chips Moman

Merrilee Rush singles chronology
"How's the Weather on Your Street" (1967)	"Angel of the Morning" (1968)	"That Kind of Woman" (1968)

Audio
- "Angel of the Morning" on YouTube

The song became a hit in 1968 through a recording by Merrilee Rush, made that January at the American Sound Studio in Memphis, with Chips Moman and Tommy Cogbill producing. Rush had come to Memphis through the group she fronted, the Turnabouts, being the opening act for a Paul Revere and the Raiders tour. While in Memphis, the Raiders recorded the album Goin' to Memphis at American Sound Studios, an association which led to Rush's discovery by Tommy Cogbill, who had been hoping to find the right voice for "Angel of the Morning" — he had kept a tape of the demo of that song constantly in his pocket for several months.

Rush recorded the song, and the tracks which would fill out her Angel of the Morning album, with the American Sound house band, even though the single and the album were credited to the group Merrilee Rush & the Turnabouts.

The single version was released in February 1968, and reached the Top 10 on the Billboard Hot 100 that June, peaking at No. 7, also reaching No. 1 in Canada, Australia, and New Zealand, and No. 4 in the Netherlands. The song earned Rush a Grammy nomination for Best Contemporary-Pop Vocal Performance, Female at the 11th Annual Grammy Awards. Rush recorded a new version of the song for her 1977 eponymous album release. (Rush's version of "Angel of the Morning" was featured on the soundtrack of the 1999 film Girl, Interrupted, set in 1967 and 1968, in which author-composer Chip Taylor's niece Angelina Jolie had a starring role.)

=== Charts ===
==== Weekly charts ====
Chart (1968)	Peak position
Canada RPM Top Singles	1
Netherlands (Single Top 100)	5
New Zealand (Listener)	1
US Billboard Hot 100	7
US Adult Contemporary (Billboard)	37
US Cash Box Top 100	3

==== Year-end charts ====
Chart (1968)	Rank
Canada	70
US Billboard Hot 100	28
US Cash Box	45

== Juice Newton version ==
"Angel of the Morning"

Single by Juice Newton

from the album Juice
- B-side: "Headin' for a Heartache"
- Released: February 1981
- Recorded: 1980
- Genre: Country; country rock; soft rock
- Length: 4:10; 3:57 (7-inch)
- Label: Capitol 4976
- Songwriter: Chip Taylor
- Producer: Richard Landis

Juice Newton singles chronology
"You Fill My Life" (1980)	"Angel of the Morning" (1981)	"Queen of Hearts" (1981)

Audio
- "Angel of the Morning" on YouTube

The highest-charting and best-selling version in the United States was recorded and released in February 1981 by country-rock singer Juice Newton for her album Juice. Newton re-interpreted the song at the suggestion of Steve Meyer, who promoted Capitol Records singles and albums to radio stations and felt that a version of the song by Newton would be a strong candidate for airplay. Newton stated that she would never have thought of recording "Angel of the Morning", even though she immediately recognized the song when Meyer played it for her: "I [had not been] really aware of that song because...when [it] was popular I was listening to folk music and R&B and not pop, and that was a very pop song."

Newton's version first entered the Billboard Hot 100 at No. 70 on the issue date of February 21, 1981. It steadily climbed the chart until it reached its peak of No. 4 on May 2, a position it held for four consecutive weeks. It also reached No. 22 on the Billboard country music chart and spent three weeks at No. 1 on the Billboard adult contemporary chart in April of that year. The recording also earned Newton a Grammy nomination, in the same category as Rush's 1968 hit, at the 24th Annual Grammy Awards. More than one million copies of Newton's single were sold in the United States, and it reached the Top 5 in a number of other countries, including Canada (number 1), Australia (number 2), South Africa (number 3), Switzerland (number 4) and New Zealand (number 5). Notably, Newton's video for "Angel of the Morning" was the first country music video aired on MTV, debuting the day the network launched, in 1981. In the UK, the recording reached No. 43 on the UK Singles Chart, marking the song's third appearance on that chart without becoming a major hit. Newton recorded the song again in 1998 for her album The Trouble with Angels.

=== Weekly charts ===
Chart (1981)	Peak position
Argentina (CAPIF)	5
Australia (Kent Music Report)	2
Austria (Ö3 Austria Top 40)	7
Canada RPM Top Singles	1
Germany (GfK)	23
Israel (IBA)	37
Portugal (AFP)	4
South Africa (Springbok Radio)	3
Switzerland (Schweizer Hitparade)	4
New Zealand (Recorded Music NZ)	5
UK Singles (Official Charts Company)	43
US Billboard Hot 100	4
US Adult Contemporary (Billboard)	1
US Hot Country Songs (Billboard)	22
US Mainstream Rock (Billboard)	57
US Cash Box Top 100	2

=== Year-end charts ===
Chart (1981)	Rank
Australia (Kent Music Report)	26
Canada	8
New Zealand	50
US Billboard Hot 100	25
US Cash Box	21

=== Certifications ===
Region	Certification	Certified units/sales
Australia (ARIA)	Gold	50,000^{^}
New Zealand (RMNZ)	Gold	15,000^{‡}
United Kingdom (BPI)	Silver	200,000^{‡}
^{^} Shipments figures based on certification alone.^{‡} Sales+streaming figures based on certification alone.

== Other versions ==
In 1968, a rendition by P. P. Arnold, who had sung background vocals on the 1967 Billie Davis version, reached No. 29 in the UK in August 1968.

In 1970, a rendition by Connie Eaton from her album Something Special reached No. 34 on the Billboard C&W charts.

Nina Simone's 1971 album Here Comes the Sun is a collection of cover songs. It includes "Angel of the Morning" as the second song on side two.

In 1977, Mary Mason also had a UK Top 30 hit with her version from her album Angel in the Morning, which was actually a medley of two Chip Taylor songs, "Angel of the Morning" and "Any Way That You Want Me", reaching No. 27.

Also in 1977, the British act Guys 'n' Dolls had a hit in the Netherlands with the song from their album Together, their version reaching No. 11 on the Dutch charts.

In 1978, a release by Melba Montgomery reached No. 22 on the Billboard C&W chart.

In 1999, Thunderbugs recorded a version for their only studio album Delicious.

The 2001 song "Angel", released by Jamaican reggae artist Shaggy featuring Barbadian singer Rayvon from his album Hot Shot, heavily interpolates the melody of "Angel of the Morning". It reached No. 1 on the Billboard Hot 100 for the week ending March 31, 2001.

=== Chip Taylor version ===
- In 1972, Taylor released a version on Buddah 325. It reached No. 101 in the Record World survey.
- In 1996, he recorded a version for his album Hit Man
- In 1999, a version by Taylor appeared on the KGSR fundraiser CD Broadcasts Vol. 7.

== In popular media ==
- The Juice Newton version of the song is featured in the opening credits scene of the 2016 film Deadpool. The sweet melody is an ironic contrast to the visual violence in the freeze-framed action scene. It is also featured in the ending scene and into the ending credits of the 2020 film Promising Young Woman.
- The Merrilee Rush version of the song is featured in the soundtrack of the NBC television series The Blacklist.
- The song plays a central role in Graeme Simsion's 2016 novel The Best of Adam Sharp.
- The Toyota Highlander "Kid Cave" commercial, aired from late 2010, featured a young boy who is embarrassed by his parents's singing of the song while he is riding with them in a car.
- Chrissie Hynde appeared as Stephanie Schiffer in a 1995 season 2 episode of Friends, "The One With the Baby On the Bus", where she performed the song.

== See also ==
- List of number-one singles in Australia during the 1960s
- List of number-one singles in 1968 (New Zealand)
- List of number-one adult contemporary singles of 1981 (U.S.)
