= Evie Sands =

American singer, songwriter and musician (born 1946)

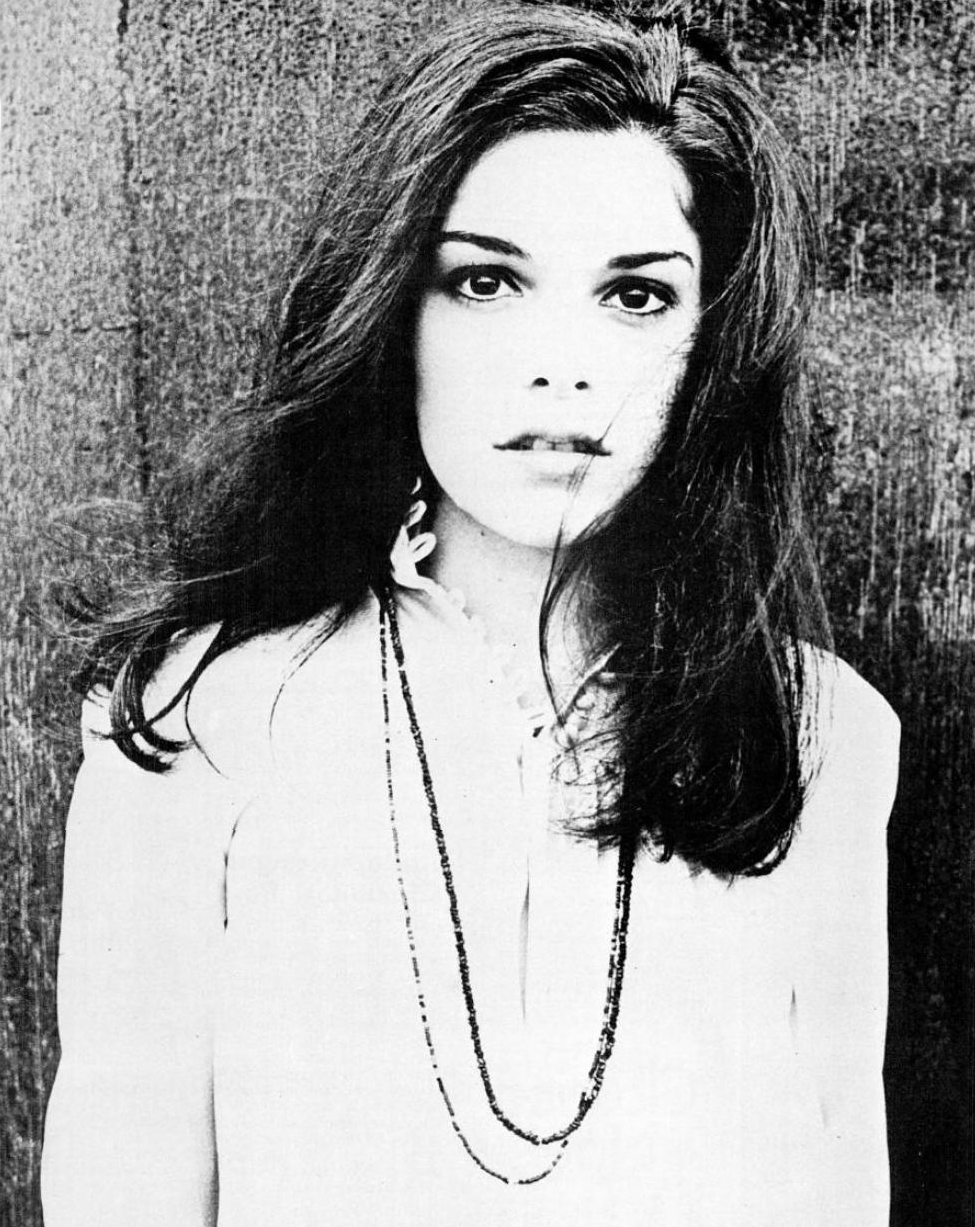
- Sands in 1969

Background information
- Born: July 18, 1946 (age 80); Brooklyn, New York, U.S.
- Genres: Rhythm and blues; blue-eyed soul; rock; pop; blues; folk rock; Americana; indie rock
- Occupations: Singer; songwriter; musician; record producer
- Instruments: Vocals; guitar; keyboards
- Years active: 1963–present
- Labels: Blue Cat; Cameo-Parkway; A&M; Capitol; RCA; Train Wreck; R-Spot

Evie Sands (born July 18, 1946) is an American singer, songwriter and musician.

Sands' music career spans more than 50 years. In the mid-1960s, while still a teenager, she began her career and eventually found chart success in 1969. Sands retired from performing in 1979 to concentrate on writing and production. She experienced a surge in cult popularity in the 1990s and returned to live performance in mid-1998. Sands continues to write and perform.

== Early life ==
Evie Sands was born in Brooklyn, New York, into a musical family. Her mother was a singer, and Sands grew up listening to artists like Ella Fitzgerald, Billie Holiday, Dinah Washington, Frank Sinatra, Doris Day, Rosemary Clooney, Peggy Lee, Patti Page, Jackie Wilson, Little Willie John and The Beatles. She was inspired by these artists to learn keyboard and guitar and to develop her own ability as a singer and songwriter. She cut her first singles by her mid-teens: "The Roll / My Dog" (ABC 10458/1963), "Danny Boy" "I Love You So" / "I Was Moved" (Gold 215/1964).

== Music career ==
=== 1960s ===
In 1965, Sands signed to the Blue Cat label of Red Bird. She toured with Red Bird star act the Shangri-Las and began a lasting collaboration with the producer-composers Chip Taylor and Al Gorgoni with the release of the blue-eyed soul single "Take Me For a Little While", written by Trade Martin. Prior to its release, a test pressing of Sands' recording was stolen by a Chicago-based record promoter, who took it to established Chess recording artist Jackie Ross, who was coming off the major pop-soul hit "Selfish One". Ross and her producers loved the song, and recorded, pressed and released the record within 48 hours, beating Sands' version to the street by a week. Backed by the marketing and promotional muscle of Chess, and with Ross' name attached, this version received the lion's share of airplay. The subsequent legal struggle set back Sands' career before it had had a chance to get started. By the time Chess withdrew the Ross single from the marketplace, Sands' version hit number 114 on Billboard's Bubbling Under Hot 100 Singles but only really broke through in the few cities—such as Los Angeles—that had stayed "on the fence", waiting to see which version to play. Ross was unaware of the duplicity involved, and left Chess shortly afterwards.

Sands' follow-up single, "I Can't Let Go", was lost amid the chaos following "Take Me For a Little While", leaving "British invaders" the Hollies clear to score a hit cover in spring 1966. That same year, Sands debuted on Cameo-Parkway and continued the pattern of songs introduced by her becoming successful for other artists. In 1967, Sands' version of the Chip Taylor-penned "Angel of the Morning" got caught up in the label's business problems. Despite the single being one of the most-requested radio songs wherever played, and the initial 10,000 copies selling out, the label's pending bankruptcy aborted the record's potential success. A few months later, then unknown Merrilee Rush scored a top-ten single with the song. Sands' last single release on Cameo-Parkway was "Billy Sunshine" in January 1968, which reached number 133 on Billboard's Bubbling Under Hot 100 Singles chart before Cameo's demise.

In 1969, Sands finally scored with the A&M single "Any Way That You Want Me", a Chip Taylor composition previously recorded by both the American Breed and the Troggs in 1966. A No. 1 hit in Birmingham, Alabama, Sands' "Any Way That You Want Me" also reached the top ten or better in Columbus, Ohio; Houston, Texas; San Diego, California; and a number of other cities. The record reached No. 53 on the Hot 100 and tied with Don Ho's "Tiny Bubbles" for most weeks (17) on that chart in the 1960s with a sub-50 peak.

Also in 1969, Sands recorded "Maybe Tomorrow", composed by Quincy Jones with lyrics by Alan and Marilyn Bergman, for the film John and Mary. The song was released as a single by A&M Records and was also included on the A&M soundtrack LP.

=== 1970s ===
Sands' debut album, also named Any Way That You Want Me, was released on A&M in 1970, several months after the single had peaked. Sands made her recorded debut as a songwriter on the album with "It's This I Am", covered years later by Beck and Beth Orton.

A Sands album to be produced by Val Garay for Buddah was announced in March 1971 but did not come to fruition. Instead, the 1975 release Estate of Mind on the Capitol Haven label ended Sands' five-year absence from recording. Produced by Dennis Lambert and Brian Potter, the album marked Sands' continued output as a songwriter, also collaborating with Richard Germinaro and veteran songwriter Ben Weisman. Two tracks from the album, Lambert and Potter's "You Brought The Woman Out Of Me" and the Sands-Weisman-Germinaro collaboration "I Love Makin' Love To You", wound up peaking at No. 50. Sands would see the latter included on the ButterFly album by Barbra Streisand. Several other Sands songs from the Estate of Mind album were also covered by a number of artists, including Dionne Warwick, Dobie Gray, Dusty Springfield, Frankie Valli, Gladys Knight, Arthur Prysock, The Manhattans, Cher/Gregg Allman, José Feliciano and Phyllis Hyman.

After a final 1976 single release on Haven, a remake of "The Way You Do the Things You Do", Sands' next release was on RCA. The company issued the album Suspended Animation, produced by Sands and Michael Stewart, in spring 1979, though Sands had actually begun working with co-producer Michael Stewart in May 1977. The album's musicians included Toto members David Hungate, Steve Lukather and Greg Phillinganes, and also Lee Ritenour and Buzz Feiten. The vocalists backing Sands included Toto frontman Bobby Kimball, Bill Champlin of Chicago and, on the track "Lady of the Night", Dusty Springfield. Despite its personnel, Suspended Animation didn't make a real chart impact for its single releases. As with her previous album, a few of the songs were covered by other artists, including Helen Reddy, Linda Clifford, Phyllis Hyman, June Pointer, The Weather Girls and Shirley Bassey. Karen Carpenter recorded two of Sands' songs for her solo album, but they remained unreleased.

After the release of that album, Sands retired from performing in 1979, but continued to work as a songwriter and producer. However, in 1996, she joined Taylor at a gig in Los Angeles, and they renewed their collaboration. That resulted in the release of the album Women in Prison in 1999.

== Later career ==
In 1982, Sands co-produced (with Leslie Ann Jones) the Holly Near album Speed Of Light. The basic band consisted of Adrienne Torf—keyboards, Carrie Barton—bass, Cam Davis—drums and Ray Obiedo—electric and acoustic guitars. Additional musicians and singers included Sands—electric guitar, acoustic guitar and backing vocals; Sheila E.—percussion; Robben Ford—electric guitar; and Vicki Randle and Linda Tillery—backing vocals. The album was recorded and mixed in San Francisco, California at The Automatt.

In late 1996, Sands went to see Chip Taylor perform at a club gig and he invited her onstage to perform with him. Despite not having kept actively in touch through the previous years, the experience was so successful that the two re-ignited their collaboration, along with Al Gorgoni, resulting in the critically acclaimed Women In Prison LP, which was released in 1999 (and again in 2000) on Taylor's Train Wreck records. A more rootsy project than the blue-eyed soul of her late 1960s-1970s output, the album consisted of various Sands-Taylor-Gorgoni originals, including a duet with Lucinda Williams on the track "Cool Blues Story". Several tracks fared well on UK/Euro indie charts. After the reconnection with Taylor, Sands returned to performing in 1998. Sands and Taylor did some shows in the UK and Europe when the album was released, including London, Glasgow, Brussels and several dates in the Netherlands.

Sands' earlier albums Any Way... and Estate... were reissued in September 2005 and June 2006 respectively, on Creation co-founder Joe Foster's Rev-Ola imprint in the United Kingdom. Sands went on to perform her own solo material as well as performing as the lead guitar player in eclectic Los Angeles based group Adam Marsland's Chaos Band. She appeared on that band's 2007 live CD, Long Promised Road: Songs of Dennis and Carl Wilson, on which she sang several lead vocals, including the first-ever released recording of Dennis Wilson's "Wouldn't It Be Nice to Live Again." She also did extensive vocal and guitar work on Marsland's 2009 double CD Go West, including lead vocals on one track. A new album, Queen Of Diamonds / Jack Of Hearts - credited to Billy Vera & Evie Sands, singing new songs of Chip Taylor - was released September 9, 2014, on Taylor's Train Wreck label. A new 6-song EP, Shine For Me, was released April 22, 2017, on R-Spot Records. A new full-length record, titled Get Out of Your Own Way, was released in 2021. The first single, "If You Give Up," which features Willie Aron (formerly of The Balancing Act and Spanish Kitchen/MysteryPop) and Isobel Campbell (formerly of Belle and Sebastian), was released in April 2020.

== Personal life ==
Sands married Richard Germinaro on June 14, 1971, in Los Angeles, but they later divorced.

== Discography ==
=== Albums ===
- Any Way That You Want Me (A&M SP-4239) – 1970
- Estate of Mind (Haven ST-9202) – 1974
- Suspended Animation (RCA Victor AFL1-2943) – 1979
- Women in Prison (Train Wreck Records TW-009) – 1998
- Queen of Diamonds / Jack of Hearts – Billy Vera & Evie Sands (Train Wreck Records TW049) – 2014
- Get Out of Your Own Way (R-Spot Records RSR-1112) – 2021

=== EPs ===
- Shine for Me (R-Spot Records RSR-1111) – 2017

=== Singles ===
- The Roll / My Dog (ABC 10458) – 1963
- Danny Boy, I Love You So / I Was Moved (Gold 215) – 1964
- Take Me for a Little While / Run Home to Your Mama (Blue Cat BC 118) – 1965 (US #114-Billboard) (#124-Cashbox)
- I Can't Let Go / Uptight (Blue Cat BC 122) – 1965
- Picture Me Gone / It Makes Me Laugh (Cameo 413) – 1966
- The Love of a Boy / We Know Better (Cameo 436) – 1966
- Angel of the Morning / Dear John (Cameo 475) – 1967
- Billy Sunshine / It Makes Me Laugh (Cameo 2002) – 1967 (US #133-Billboard) (#115-Cashbox)
- Until It's Time for You to Go / Shadow Of The Evening (A&M 0980) – 1968
- One Fine Summer Morning / I'll Hold Out My Hand (A&M 1026) – 1969
- Any Way That You Want Me / I'll Never Be Alone Again (A&M 1090) – 1969 (US #53-Billboard) (#45-Cashbox), (#34-Record World), (CAN #40-RPM Magazine), (AUS #85 Kent Music Report)
- Maybe Tomorrow / Crazy Annie (A&M 1157) – 1969 (US #116-Billboard)
- But You Know I Love You / Maybe Tomorrow (A&M 1175) – 1970 (US #110-Billboard), (#30-Billboard Adult Contemporary), (CAN #89-RPM Magazine, #43-AC)
- It's This I Am, I Find / Take Me for a Little While (A&M 1192) – 1970
- You Brought the Woman Out of Me / Early Morning Sunshine (Haven 7010) – 1974 (US-#50-Billboard), (#63-Cashbox)
- I Love Makin' Love to You / One Thing on My Mind (Haven 7013) – 1974 (US-#50-Billboard), (#44-Cashbox), (CAN #59-RPM Magazine)
- Yesterday Can't Hurt Me / (Am I) Crazy Cause I Believe (Haven 7020) – 1975 (#36-Billboard Adult Contemporary), (CAN #92-RPM Magazine, #47 RPM AC)
- The Way You Do the Things You Do / Love in the Afternoon (Haven 806) – 1976 (AUS #100)
- Keep My Love Light Burnin' / I Can't Wait for You (RCA 11549) – 1979
- You Sho' Look Good to Me / Brain Damage (RCA 11653) – 1979
- Angel in Your Eyes (TrainWreck) – 2000
- If You Give Up (R-Spot Records) – 2020

=== Guest appearances ===
With Quincy Jones

- John and Mary (soundtrack) (A&M, 1970)
