= Chip Taylor =

American singer and songwriter (1940–2026)

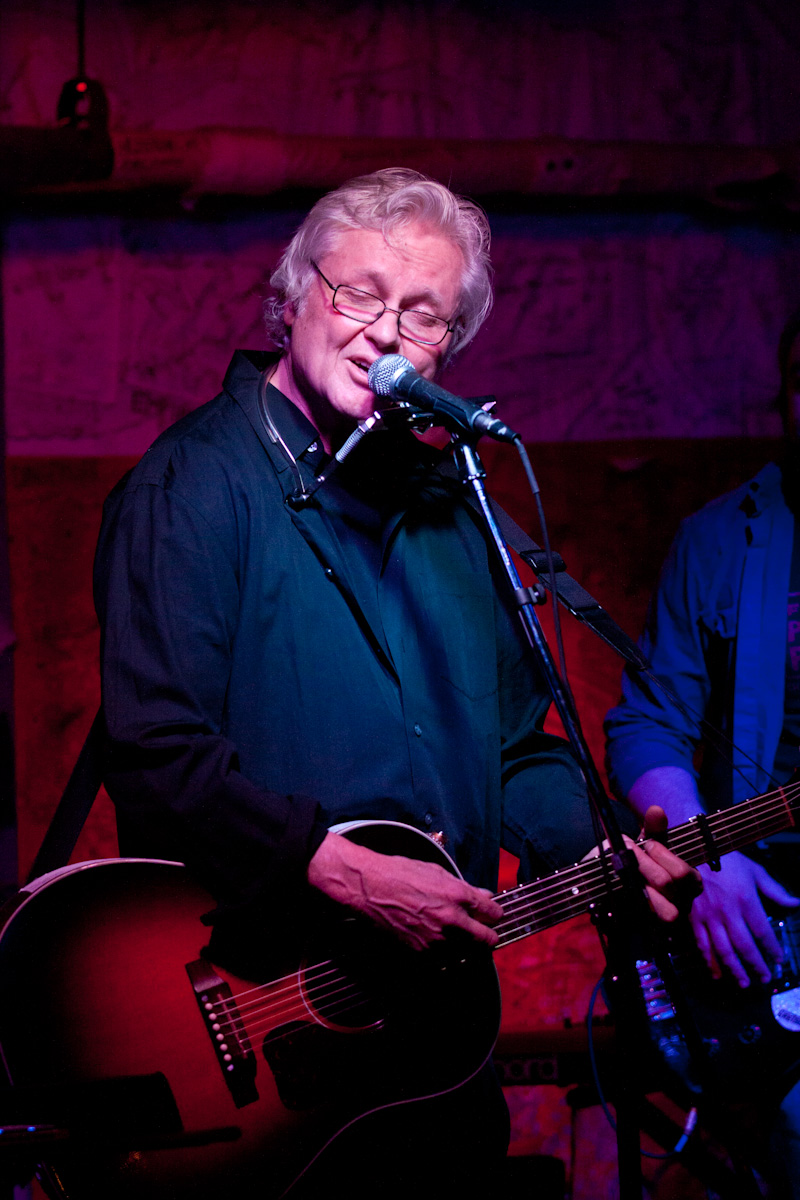
- Taylor in 2012

Background information
- Born: James Wesley Voight; March 21, 1940; Yonkers, New York, U.S.
- Died: March 23, 2026 (aged 86) New York, U.S.
- Genres: Country; pop
- Occupations: Songwriter; singer
- Years active: 1960s–2026
- Labels: Buddah; Warner Bros.; CBS; Capitol; Train Wreck
- Personal details
- Spouse: Joan Carole Frey (m. 1964; died 2025)
- Children: 2
- Relatives: Barry Voight (brother); Jon Voight (brother); Angelina Jolie (niece); James Haven (nephew)

James Wesley Voight (March 21, 1940 – March 23, 2026), known professionally as Chip Taylor, was an American songwriter and singer. He is noted for writing "Angel of the Morning" and "Wild Thing".

== Early life ==
Taylor was born in Yonkers, New York, on March 21, 1940. He was the brother of actor Jon Voight and geologist Barry Voight and the uncle of actress Angelina Jolie and actor James Haven. Taylor and his brothers attended Archbishop Stepinac High School in White Plains, New York. In 1961, Taylor attended the University of Hartford in Hartford, Connecticut, for one year.

After an unsuccessful attempt to become a professional golfer like his father, Elmer Voight, Taylor entered the music business.

== Career ==
=== As songwriter ===
Taylor wrote many pop and rock songs, both alone and with other songwriters, including Al Gorgoni (with whom he also performed, as the duo Just Us), Billy Vera, Ted Daryll, and Jerry Ragovoy. He first freelanced and was later an employee of a New York City music publisher.

His first big hit was "Wild Thing", first recorded in 1965 by Jordan Christopher and the Wild Ones. It became famous as a hit single by the Troggs in 1966 and a live performance by Jimi Hendrix in 1967. The song was later covered by the Runaways, the Muppets, and X. "Angel of the Morning" was first recorded by Evie Sands in 1967, before becoming a hit for Merrilee Rush and also P. P. Arnold in 1968. It was a million-selling single in 1981 for country-pop singer Juice Newton, and later a rendition from Chrissie Hynde was released.

Other notable pop and country songs written by Taylor included "He Sits at Your Table" (Willie Nelson), "I Can't Let Go" (Evie Sands, the Hollies, Linda Ronstadt), "The Baby" (the Hollies), "Worry" (Johnny Tillotson), "Make Me Belong to You" (Barbara Lewis), "I Can Make It With You" (the Pozo Seco Singers, Jackie DeShannon), "Any Way That You Want Me" (the Troggs, Evie Sands, Melanie, American Breed, Juice Newton, Mary Mason, Lita Ford, Liverpool Five), "On My Word" (Cliff Richard), "Step Out of Your Mind" (The American Breed), "Country Girl City Man" (Billy Vera and Judy Clay), "I'll Hold Out My Hand", "Try (Just a Little Bit Harder)" (Lorraine Ellison, Janis Joplin), "Julie" (Bobby Fuller Four, Marshall Crenshaw), and "Lonely Is As Lonely Does" (the Fleetwoods).

Shaggy used "Angel of the Morning" as the basis for his hit "Angel" in 2001.

In 2009, Ace Records released a compilation CD of some of Taylor's compositions as recorded by other artists (Wild Thing: The Songs of Chip Taylor).

=== His own recordings ===
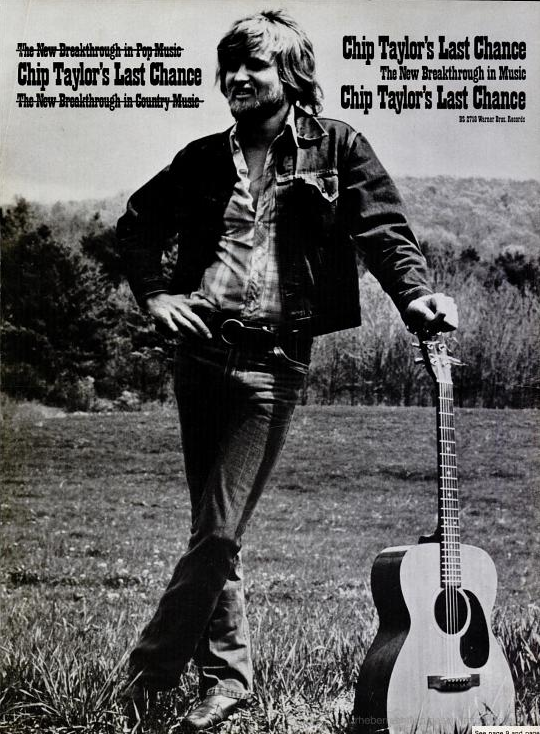
Chip Taylor, 1973

Taylor's first releases were on the King label and their subsidiary DeLuxe. In 1958, he and the Town Three released two 45s on DeLuxe, numbers 6176 "Midnight Blues" and 6180 "I Want a Lover". In 1959, he recorded for King as Wes Voight on 5211 "I'm Movin' In", and his final recording as Wes Voight on King 5231 "I'm Ready to Go Steady" and "The Wind and the Cold Black Night". The two King 45s were released in both mono and stereo, making them some of the first stereo singles available. Taylor released recordings on Warner Bros., Columbia, and Capitol. His first chart single was his recording (as Chip Taylor) of "Here I Am" in 1962 on Warner Bros. Records. He also had a top 40 hit in Australia in 1963 with "Sandy Sandy" with the Town and Country Brothers, a later iteration of Wes Voight and the Town Three, with Ted Daryll (who wrote the song) and Greg Richards, writers of "She Cried" by Jay and the Americans.

=== Performing and recording in the 1990s and the 21st century ===
Taylor restarted his performing and recording career in 1993. At the 2001 South by Southwest Music Conference in Austin, Texas, he met singer and violinist Carrie Rodriguez, with whom he performed and recorded Americana music for several years. The duo recorded Let's Leave This Town in 2002. They released The Trouble With Humans the following year and the critically acclaimed Red Dog Tracks in 2005. Each subsequently released successful solo albums. Taylor's double-CD Unglorious Hallelujah/Red Red Rose, his first solo album in five years, was hailed as "a future classic" by Sonic Magazine, whose reviewer declared: "This is the best we've heard from Chip Taylor so far." Rodriguez's solo album, Seven Angels on a Bicycle, was released in August 2006. In late 2006 and early 2007, Rodriguez toured on her own but continued to perform with Taylor from time to time. Taylor performed a series of shows with guitarist John Platania and the young singer/fiddler Kendel Carson, and he produced both their 2007 albums.

During the 21st century through 2020, Taylor continued to perform with his band The New Ukrainians (John Platania on electric guitar, Björn Petterson on bass, and a revolving cast of other musicians). Each concert almost always included both "Wild Thing" and "Angel in the Morning". Taylor's album Yonkers, NY was a 2011 nominee for a Grammy Award for best recording package, but lost to Brothers by the Black Keys. In 2012, Paal Flaata released an album of only Chip Taylor songs, Wait by the Fire – Songs of Chip Taylor. Taylor's performance of his song "On the Radio" was featured in Episode 8 of Season 2 of the Netflix TV series Sex Education.

=== Rainy Day Records ===
In 1967, Taylor, along with Al Gorgoni, formed Rainy Day Records, which was distributed by Jubilee Records. The label released the single "Night Owl" by the Flying Machine, a group that included James Taylor.

=== Train Wreck Records ===
In 2007, Taylor launched his own independent label, Train Wreck Records.

== Personal life and death ==
By Taylor's own accounts, from 1980 through 1995, he was very successful at, but unhappily addicted to, gambling professionally on blackjack in New Jersey casinos and on horse races. He returned to music, starting by singing to his dying mother, Barbara Voight. Taylor has said that the gambling addiction was hard on both himself and his family. He has written that, after having an epiphany, he changed his attitude and created the "Church of the Train Wreck" self-help program for himself and others.

Taylor continued to live in New York City. He was married to Joan Carole Frey from 1964, and they had children and grandchildren. Joan and Chip were temporarily divorced for several years, starting in the 1990s. She died in June 2025.

Taylor received treatment for throat cancer in 2023. He died from cancer at a hospital in New York on March 23, 2026, two days after his 86th birthday.

== Discography ==
=== Albums ===
Year	Album	US Country	Label
1971	Gotta Get Back to Cisco [as Gorgoni, Martin & Taylor]	—	Buddah
1972	Gorgoni, Martin & Taylor [as Gorgoni, Martin & Taylor]	—	Buddah
1972	Gasoline	—	Buddah
1973	Chip Taylor's Last Chance	—	Warner Bros.
1974	Some of Us	—	Warner Bros.
1975	This Side of the Big River	36	Warner Bros.
1976	Somebody Shoot Out the Jukebox [with Ghost Train]	—	CBS
1979	Saint Sebastian	—	Capitol
1996	Hit Man	—	Gadfly
1997	Living Room Tapes	—	Gadfly
1999	Seven Days in May... A Love Story	—	
2000	London Sessions Bootleg	—	
2001	Black & Blue America	—	
2002	Let's Leave This Town	—	Lone Star
2003	The Trouble with Humans	—	Lone Star
2005	Red Dog Tracks	—	Back Porch Records
2006	Unglorious Hallelujah	—	Back Porch Records
2007	Live from the Ruhr Triennale	—	MRI
2008	New Songs of Freedom	—	Megaforce
2008	Songs from a Dutch Tour	—	Train Wreck
2009	Yonkers NY	—	Train Wreck
2012	Fuck All the Perfect People	—	Train Wreck
2013	Block Out the Sirens of This Lonely World	—	Train Wreck
2014	The Little Prayers Trilogy	—	Train Wreck
2016	Little Brothers	—	Train Wreck
2017	Rock and Roll Joe	—	Train Wreck
2018	Fix Your Words	—	Train Wreck
2018	Time Waits for No Little Girls Uncovered	—	Train Wreck
2019	Whiskey Salesman	—	Train Wreck
2020	In Sympathy of a Heartbreak	—	Train Wreck
2023	The Cradle of All Living Things	—	Train Wreck
2024	Behind the Sky		Train Wreck
2025	The Truth and Other Things		Train Wreck

=== Compilations ===
Year	Album	Label
2008	Angels & Gamblers: Best of 1971–1979	Raven Records
2010	James Wesley Days Best of 99–10	Rootsy / Train Wreck

=== Singles ===
Year	Single	Chart positions		Album
Year	Single	U.S. Country	CAN Country	Album
1958	"Midnight Blues/Another Guy's Line"			DeLuxe 6176
1958	"I Want a Lover/Little Joan"			DeLuxe 6180
1959	"I'm Movin' In/Everything's the Same"			King 5211
1959	"I'm Ready to Go Steady/The Wind and the Cold Black Night"			King 5231
1962	"Here I Am/I Love You but I Know"			
1967	"You Should Be from Monterey/I'll Never Be Alone"			Rainy Day 45-8002
1973	"101 in Cashbox"			Chip Taylor's Last Chance
1975	"Me As I Am"	80	—	Some of Us
1975	"Early Sunday Morning"	28	41	Some of Us
1975	"Big River"	61	—	This Side of the Big River
1976	"Circle of Tears"	92	—	This Side of the Big River
1977	"Hello Atlanta" (with Ghost Train)	93	—	Somebody Shoot Out the Jukebox

=== Music videos ===
Year	Video
2008	"New Song Of Freedom"
2009	"Charcoal Sky"
2011	"Fuck All The Perfect People"
2014	"Little Prayers"
2014	"Queen of the World"
2015	"Refugee Children"
2016	"Who's Gonna Build That Wall"
2017	"Whisper Amen"
2017	"Senorita Falling Down"
