= List of number-one singles in 1968 (New Zealand) =

This is a list of Number 1 hit singles in 1968 in New Zealand, starting with the first chart dated, 19 January 1968.

== Chart ==
Week	Artist	Title
19 January 1968	The Beatles	"Hello, Goodbye"
26 January 1968	The Beatles	"Hello, Goodbye"
2 February 1968	The Beatles	"Hello, Goodbye"
9 February 1968	The Monkees	"Daydream Believer"
16 February 1968	The Monkees	"Daydream Believer"
23 February 1968	The Monkees	"Daydream Believer"
1 March 1968	The Monkees	"Daydream Believer"
8 March 1968	The Scaffold	"Thank U Very Much"
15 March 1968	American Breed	"Bend Me, Shape Me"
22 March 1968	American Breed	"Bend Me, Shape Me"
29 March 1968	Mr. Lee Grant	"Why Or Where Or When"
5 April 1968	Mr. Lee Grant	"Why Or Where Or When"
12 April 1968	Manfred Mann	"Quinn the Eskimo (The Mighty Quinn)"
19 April 1968	The Beatles	"Lady Madonna"
26 April 1968	The Beatles	"Lady Madonna"
3 May 1968	Dave Dee, Dozy, Beaky, Mick & Tich	"The Legend of Xanadu"
10 May 1968	Dave Dee, Dozy, Beaky, Mick & Tich	"The Legend of Xanadu"
17 May 1968	Dave Dee, Dozy, Beaky, Mick & Tich	"The Legend of Xanadu"
24 May 1968	Dave Dee, Dozy, Beaky, Mick & Tich	"The Legend of Xanadu"
31 May 1968	Gary Puckett & the Union Gap	Young Girl
7 June 1968	Gary Puckett & the Union Gap	Young Girl
14 June 1968	Gary Puckett & the Union Gap	Young Girl
21 June 1968	Bobby Goldsboro	"Honey"
28 June 1968	Small Faces	"Lazy Sunday"
5 July 1968	Small Faces	"Lazy Sunday"
12 July 1968	Small Faces	"Lazy Sunday"
19 July 1968	Simple Image	"Spinning, Spinning, Spinning"
26 July 1968	Simple Image	"Spinning, Spinning, Spinning"
2 August 1968	Rolling Stones	"Jumpin' Jack Flash"
9 August 1968	Rolling Stones	"Jumpin' Jack Flash"
16 August 1968	The Ohio Express	"Yummy, Yummy, Yummy"
23 August 1968	Merrilee Rush	"Angel of the Morning"
30 August 1968	Merrilee Rush	"Angel of the Morning"
6 September 1968	The Cowsills	"Indian Lake"
13 September 1968	The Cowsills	"Indian Lake"
20 September 1968	The Cowsills	"Indian Lake"
27 September 1968	Allison Durbin	"I Have Loved Me a Man"
4 October 1968	Allison Durbin	"I Have Loved Me a Man"
11 October 1968	The Beatles	"Hey Jude"
18 October 1968	The Beatles	"Hey Jude"
25 October 1968	The Beatles	"Hey Jude"
1 November 1968	The Beatles	"Hey Jude"
8 November 1968	The Beatles	"Hey Jude"
15 November 1968	The Beatles	"Revolution"
22 November 1968	The Casuals	"Jesamine"
29 November 1968	The Casuals	"Jesamine"
6 December 1968	Leapy Lee	"Little Arrows"
13 December 1968	Leapy Lee	"Little Arrows"
20 December 1968	The Turtles	"Elenore"
27 December 1968	The Tremeloes	"My Little Lady"
