= Connie Eaton =

American singer-songwriter (1950–1999)

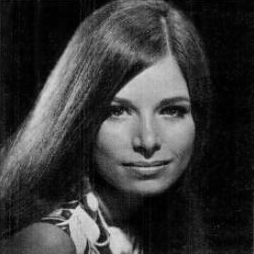
- Connie Eaton in 1969

Background information
- Born: March 1, 1950
- Origin: Nashville, Tennessee, U.S.
- Died: September 30, 1999 (aged 49)
- Genres: Country
- Occupation: Singer
- Years active: 1970–1975
- Labels: Chart, ABC

Connie Frank Eaton (March 1, 1950 – September 30, 1999) was an American country music singer. Eaton was a native of Nashville, Tennessee, and began her recording career as a teenager in the late 1960s, recording for Chart Records. Chart was the label that established Lynn Anderson as a major country singer and Eaton was considered by the country music press as the label's "next" Anderson. Prior to beginning her recording career, Eaton had been a runner-up in a "Miss Nashville" beauty contest. Her first record, "Too Many Dollars, Not Enough Sense", a Liz Anderson song, was released in 1968.

Eaton had a top 40 country hit with a cover of Merrilee Rush's pop record "Angel of the Morning" in 1970 which earned her a Billboard "Most Promising Female Vocalist" nomination but this proved to be Eaton's only hit record during her years on the Chart label although a duet with Dave Peel, a cover of Ray Charles' "Hit the Road Jack" came within a few spots of cracking the Top 40 also in 1970. Eaton released three albums and numerous singles for Chart Records and later recorded for on a few minor labels. In 1975, she returned to the major labels with an ABC Records contract and had her biggest hit, "Lonely Men, Lonely Women", which peaked at No. 23. Her album for ABC, however, did not chart and the follow-up singles were not successful. By the late 1970s, Eaton was out of the music industry. She died from cancer in 1999 at age 49.

Connie Eaton's daughter Cortney Tidwell is a recording artist in her own right.

== Early life and education ==
Connie Frank Eaton was the daughter of Robert "Bob" Caldwell Eaton and his wife. Her father was a regular on the Grand Ole Opry radio show and was known for the song "Second Hand Heart". She was named after Joseph Frank, his manager on the Opry.

Eaton's younger brother was Robert Michael "Mike" Eaton. Her other brother was Harvill Eaton, an educator who taught engineering at Louisiana State University and served as president of Cumberland University.

=== Schooling and early performing ===
Eaton began singing around the age of six years old. In August 1964, she was named "Discovery of the Week" by The Nashville Tennessean newspaper and was invited to perform at a concert in Centennial Park, Nashville, Tennessee. According to the Tennessean, she had a "strong determination" to become a professional singer.

While studying at Two Rivers High School in Nashville, she played the clarinet in the school band. She also acted in productions by the Nashville Children's Theatre group alongside her brother Mike. In June 1968, Eaton graduated from Two Rivers. She later attended David Lipscomb College and was a member of the Gamma Lambda sorority.

== Career ==
In June 1968, Eaton took part in the Miss Nashville pageant competition. She played guitar and sang for the talent section, and was one of five finalists in the contest. By August 13, 1968, she was signed with Chart Records and had released the song "Two Many Dollars, Not Enough Sense" the previous week.

== Personal life ==
In July 1970, Eaton announced her engagement to Clifford Bradley Williamson, director of artists and repertoire at Chart Records.

== Discography ==
=== Albums ===
Year	Album	Label
1969	I've Got a Life to Live	Chart
1970	Hit the Road Jack (with Dave Peel)	Chart
1971	Something Special	Chart
1975	Connie Eaton	ABC

=== Singles ===
Year	Single	Chart Positions		Album
Year	Single	US Country	CAN Country	Album
1970	"Angel of the Morning"	34	11	Something Special
1970	"Hit the Road Jack" (with Dave Peel)	44	—	Hit the Road Jack
1970	"It Takes Two" (with Dave Peel)	56	—	Hit the Road Jack
1971	"Sing a Happy Song"	74	—	Something Special
1971	"Don't Hang No Halos on Me"	56	—	single only
1975	"Lonely Men, Lonely Women"	23	37	Connie Eaton
1975	"If I Knew Enough to Come Out of the Rain"	93	—	Connie Eaton
