= List of number-one singles of 1981 (Canada) =

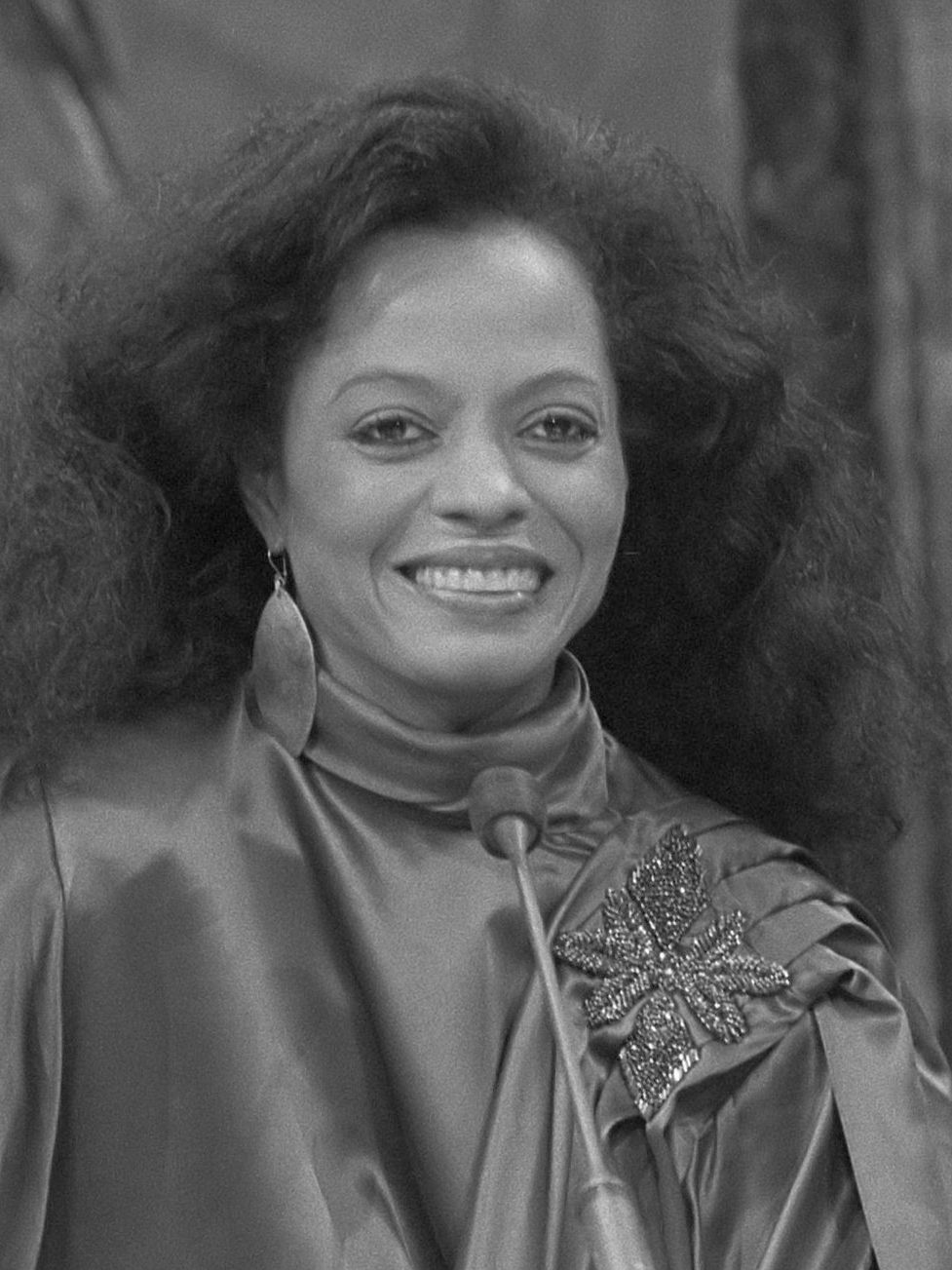
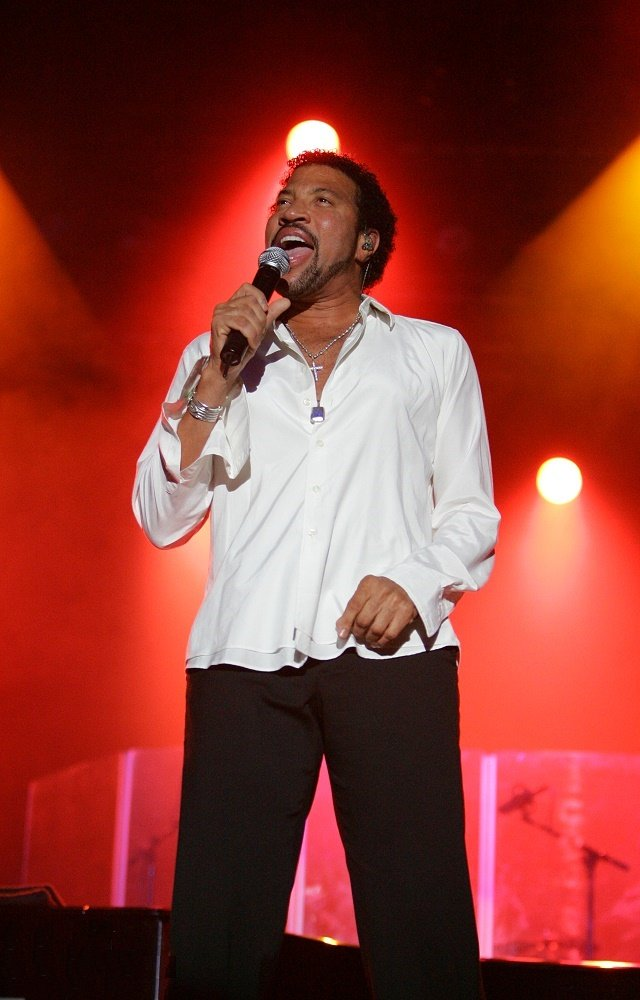
Diana Ross (left) and Lionel Richie (right) spent the most published issues at number one with "Endless Love", the third-most-successful single of the year.

RPM was a Canadian magazine that published the best-performing singles of Canada from 1964 to 2000. A total of sixteen singles reached number one on the RPM Singles Chart in 1981. The year began with "(Just Like) Starting Over" by John Lennon at the top spot and ended with Olivia Newton-John's "Physical" at the summit. Eleven of the sixteen artists earned their first Canadian chart-topper this year; those who did so prior to 1981 were John Lennon, Blondie, Styx, The Moody Blues, and Olivia Newton-John. Lennon became the only artist this year to attain the number-one spot with more than one single, and no Canadians topped their home county's chart this year.

The best-performing single of the year in Canada was "Stars on 45 Medley" (also known as "Medley") by Dutch novelty act Stars on 45. Because no RPM issues were published between 11 July and 22 August, it remained at number one for 12 weeks, preventing the second-most-successful single of the year, "Bette Davis Eyes" by Kim Carnes, from taking the position. The song that spent the most published issues at number one, six, was "Endless Love" by Diana Ross and Lionel Richie, becoming Richie's first Canadian number-one hit and Ross's only chart-topper in Canada outside the Supremes. The singer who stayed at number one for the most weeks this year was John Lennon, whose singles "(Just Like) Starting Over" and "Woman" gave him seven weeks at the summit. The other acts that remained at number one for at least three weeks were Blondie, Kool & the Gang, and Juice Newton.

Key
† Indicates best-performing single of 1981

== Chart history ==
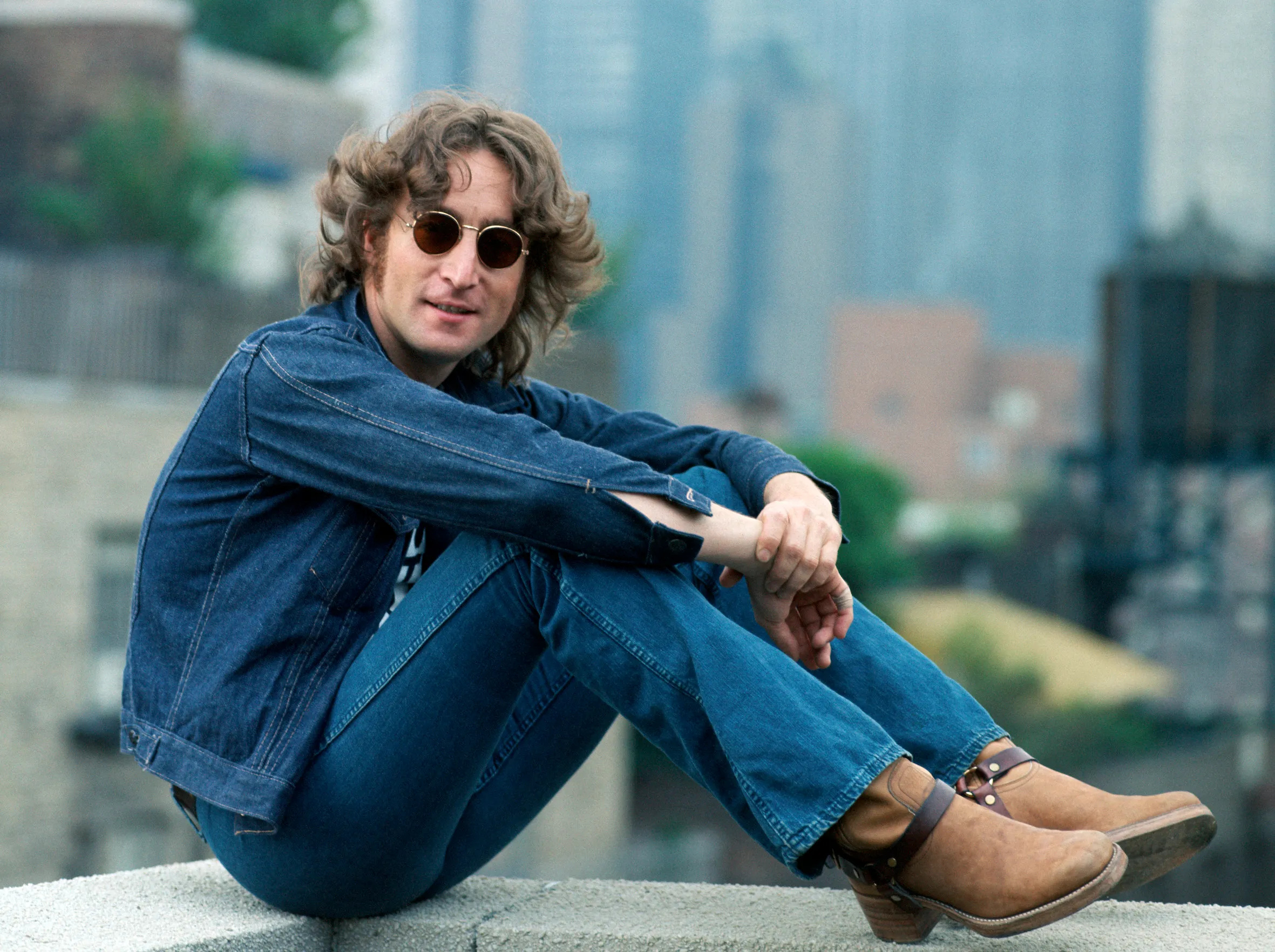
John Lennon posthumously occupied the number-one position for seven weeks in 1981 with two records: "(Just Like) Starting Over" and "Woman".

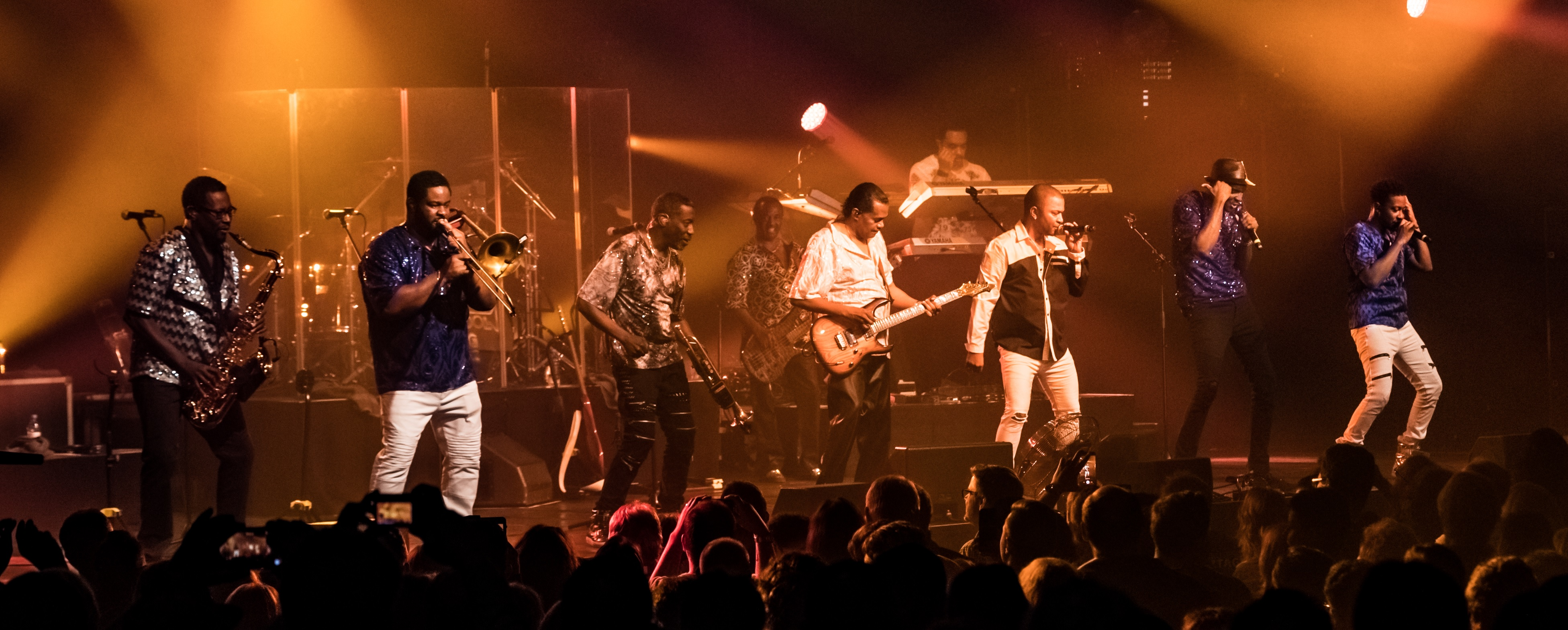
American funk band Kool & the Gang topped the chart for three weeks with "Celebration".

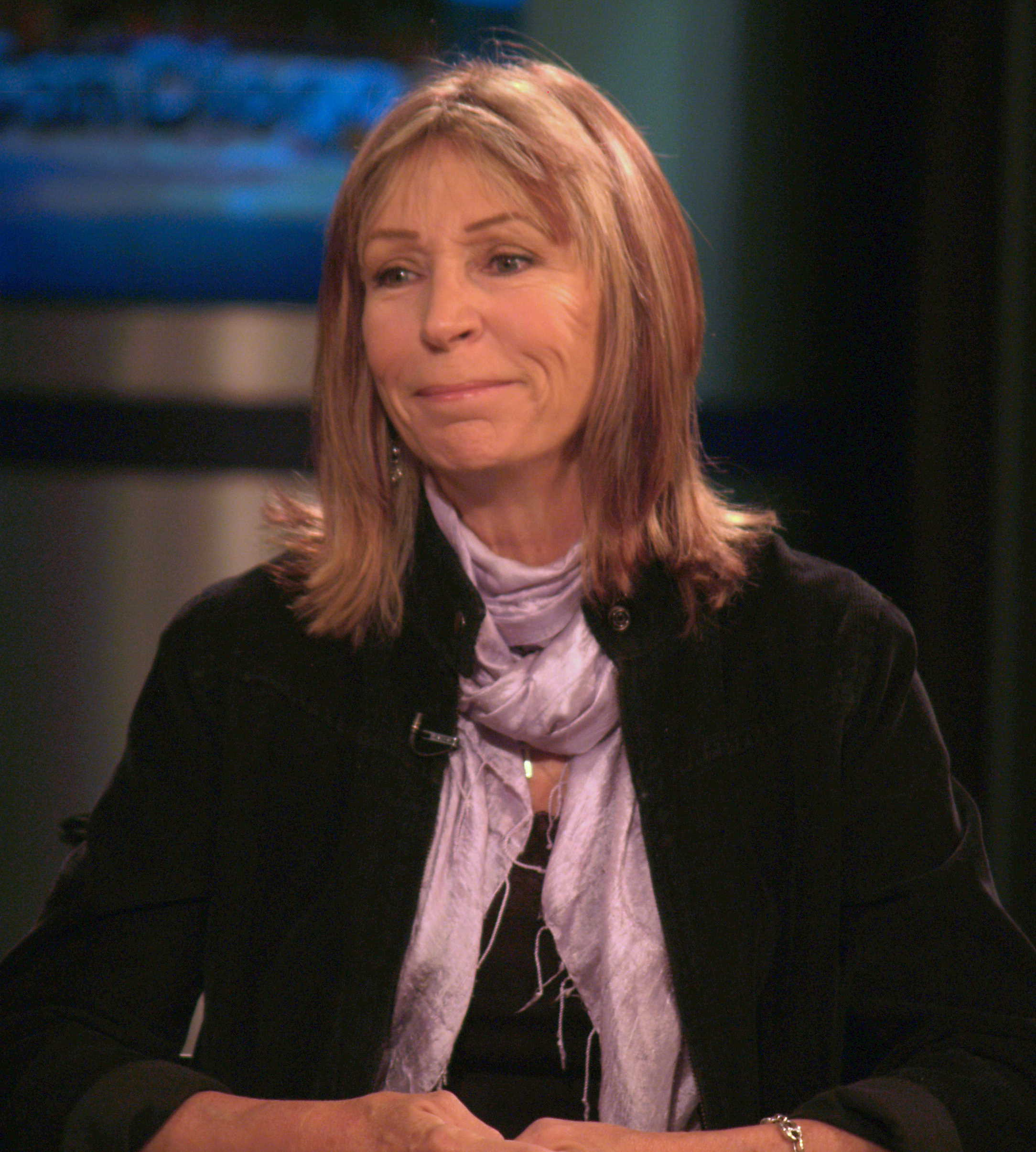
Singer Juice Newton had a Canadian number-one hit in 1981 with "Angel of the Morning".

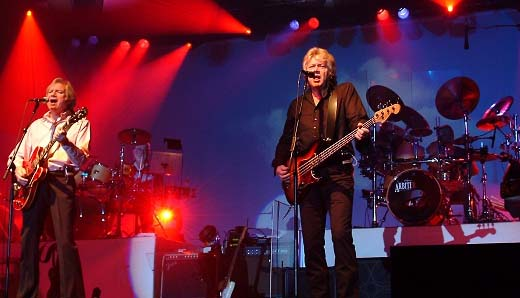
English band the Moody Blues spent a week atop the chart with "Gemini Dream" in August.

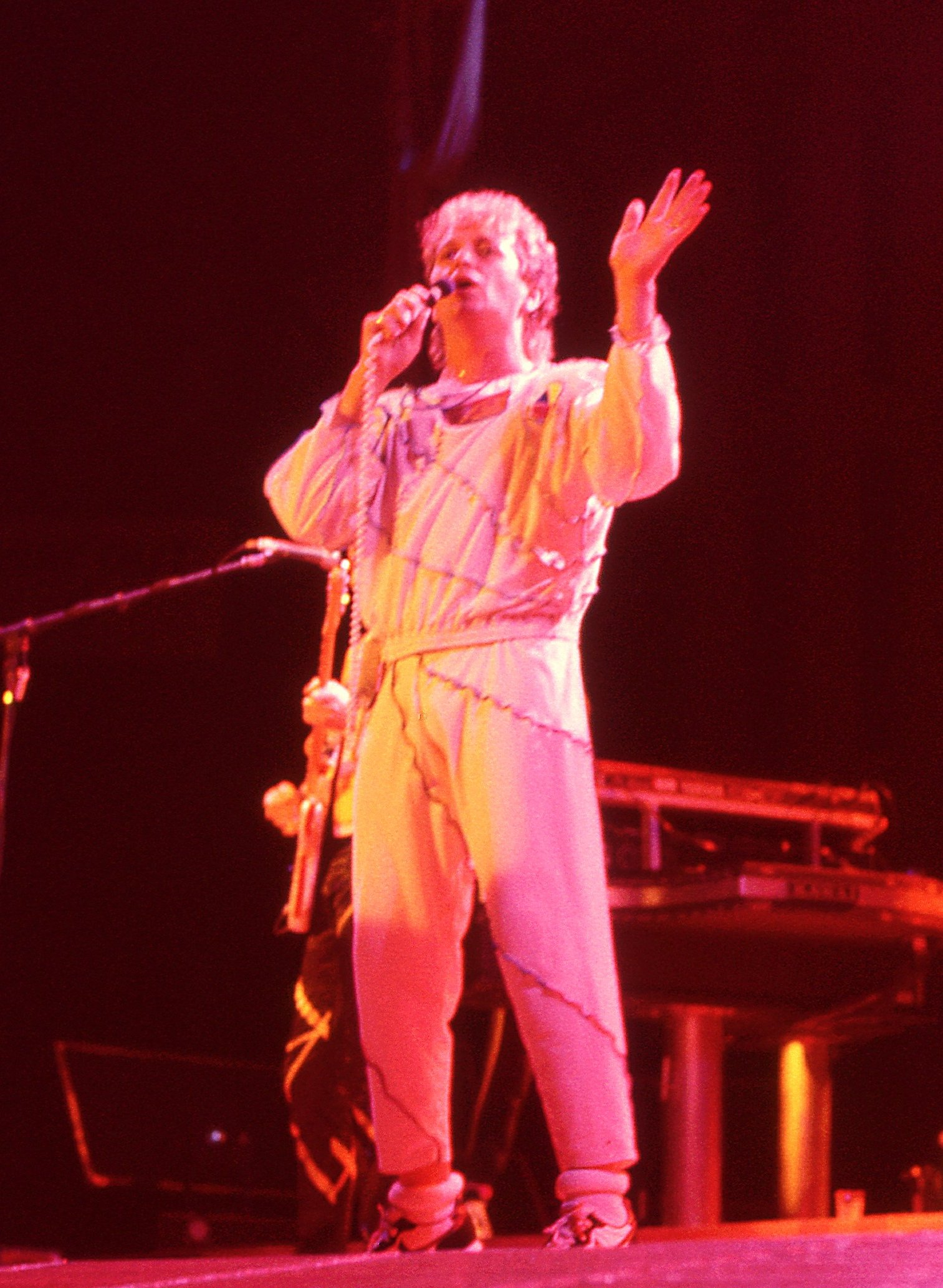
Jon Anderson (pictured), collaborating with Greek composer Vangelis, topped the chart for five weeks with "The Friends of Mr. Cairo".

| Issue date | Song | Artist | Reference |
|---|---|---|---|
| 3 January (Note: Due to a four-week break in publication over the 1980/1981 Christmas/New Year period, the weeks of 3 January, 10 January and 17 January are inferred.) | "(Just Like) Starting Over" | John Lennon | |
| 10 January | "(Just Like) Starting Over" | John Lennon | |
| 17 January | "(Just Like) Starting Over" | John Lennon | |
| 24 January | "(Just Like) Starting Over" | John Lennon | |
| 31 January | "(Just Like) Starting Over" | John Lennon | |
| 7 February | "The Tide Is High" | Blondie | |
| 14 February | "The Tide Is High" | Blondie | |
| 21 February | "The Tide Is High" | Blondie | |
| 28 February | "The Tide Is High" | Blondie | |
| 7 March | "The Best of Times" | Styx | |
| 14 March | "Woman" | John Lennon | |
| 21 March | "Woman" | John Lennon | |
| 28 March | "Celebration" | Kool & the Gang | |
| 4 April | "Celebration" | Kool & the Gang | |
| 11 April | "Celebration" | Kool & the Gang | |
| 18 April | "9 to 5" | Dolly Parton | |
| 25 April | "9 to 5" | Dolly Parton | |
| 2 May | "Morning Train (9 to 5)" | Sheena Easton | |
| 9 May | "Morning Train (9 to 5)" | Sheena Easton | |
| 16 May | "Angel of the Morning" | Juice Newton | |
| 23 May | "Angel of the Morning" | Juice Newton | |
| 30 May | "Angel of the Morning" | Juice Newton | |
| 6 June | "Stars on 45 Medley"† | Stars on 45 | |
| 13 June | "Stars on 45 Medley"† | Stars on 45 | |
| 20 June | "Stars on 45 Medley"† | Stars on 45 | |
| 27 June | "Stars on 45 Medley"† | Stars on 45 | |
| 4 July | "Stars on 45 Medley"† | Stars on 45 | |
| 11 July (Note: No charts were published between 11 July and 22 August, so a seven-week gap is inferred.) | "Stars on 45 Medley"† | Stars on 45 | |
| 18 July | "Stars on 45 Medley"† | Stars on 45 | |
| 25 July | "Stars on 45 Medley"† | Stars on 45 | |
| 1 August | "Stars on 45 Medley"† | Stars on 45 | |
| 8 August | "Stars on 45 Medley"† | Stars on 45 | |
| 15 August | "Stars on 45 Medley"† | Stars on 45 | |
| 22 August | "Stars on 45 Medley"† | Stars on 45 | |
| 29 August | "Gemini Dream" | The Moody Blues | |
| 5 September | "Sausalito Summernight" | Diesel | |
| 12 September | "Urgent" | Foreigner | |
| 19 September | "Urgent" | Foreigner | |
| 26 September | "Endless Love" | Diana Ross and Lionel Richie | |
| 3 October | "Endless Love" | Diana Ross and Lionel Richie | |
| 10 October | "Endless Love" | Diana Ross and Lionel Richie | |
| 17 October | "Endless Love" | Diana Ross and Lionel Richie | |
| 24 October | "Endless Love" | Diana Ross and Lionel Richie | |
| 31 October | "Endless Love" | Diana Ross and Lionel Richie | |
| 7 November | "Every Little Thing She Does Is Magic" | The Police | |
| 14 November | "The Friends of Mr. Cairo" | Jon and Vangelis | |
| 21 November | "The Friends of Mr. Cairo" | Jon and Vangelis | |
| 28 November | "The Friends of Mr. Cairo" | Jon and Vangelis | |
| 5 December | "The Friends of Mr. Cairo" | Jon and Vangelis | |
| 12 December | "The Friends of Mr. Cairo" | Jon and Vangelis | |
| 19 December | "Physical" | Olivia Newton-John | |
| 26 December | "Physical" | Olivia Newton-John | |

== See also ==
- 1981 in music
- List of RPM number-one adult contemporary singles of 1981
- List of RPM number-one country singles of 1981
- List of Billboard Hot 100 number ones of 1981
- List of Cashbox Top 100 number-one singles of 1981
- List of Canadian number-one albums of 1981
