= I Can't Let Go =

1966 song by The Hollies

- Danish picture sleeve

Single by the Hollies
- B-side: "Running Through the Night" (UK); "I've Got A Way Of My Own" (US)
- Released: 18 February 1966
- Recorded: 13 and 18 January 1966
- Studio: EMI, London
- Genre: Power pop, beat
- Length: 2:26
- Label: Parlophone (UK); Imperial (US)
- Songwriters: Chip Taylor, Al Gorgoni
- Producer: Ron Richards

The Hollies singles chronology
"If I Needed Someone" (1965)	"I Can't Let Go" (1966)	"Bus Stop" (1966)

"I Can't Let Go" is a song co-written by Al Gorgoni and Chip Taylor, who also wrote "Wild Thing". "I Can't Let Go" was originally recorded by the blue-eyed soul singer Evie Sands on George Goldner's Blue Cat label, which was popular in New York City in 1965. The song became popular in 1966 for the group the Hollies, who charted at number two in the UK Singles Chart with their version. Linda Ronstadt recorded the song in 1980 and had a number 31 hit on the US Billboard Hot 100 chart.

== The Hollies version ==
=== Background ===
"I Can't Let Go" is the Hollies' first 1966 single, and their last with original bassist Eric Haydock. It peaked at number two in the UK and number 42 on the Billboard Hot 100 in the US. It is ranked as the 37th biggest British hit of 1966. The Hollies' version was praised by Paul McCartney, who thought Graham Nash's soaring tenor in the chorus was a trumpet. Billboard described the song as a "pulsating number with driving dance beat." After "I Can't Let Go" was recorded, Haydock was replaced by Bernie Calvert, who played on the band's next single ("Bus Stop").

=== Chart performance ===
Chart (1966)	Peak position
Finland (Soumen Virallinen)	34
West Germany (GfK)	30
Netherlands (Single Top 100)	20
Ireland (IRMA)	3
New Zealand (Listener)	9
Norway (VG-lista)	2
South Africa (Springbok)	14
Sweden	10
United Kingdom (Record Retailer)	2
United Kingdom (NME)	1
United States (Billboard Hot 100)	42
Canada (RPM)	44

== Linda Ronstadt version ==
"I Can't Let Go"

Single by Linda Ronstadt

from the album Mad Love
- B-side: "Look Out For My Love"
- Released: 10 June 1980
- Genre: New wave
- Length: 2:41
- Label: Asylum
- Songwriters: Chip Taylor; Al Gorgoni
- Producer: Peter Asher

Linda Ronstadt singles chronology
"Hurt So Bad" (1980)	"I Can't Let Go" (1980)	"Get Closer" (1982)

=== Background ===
Linda Ronstadt released the most successful American version in 1980 from her platinum-certified album, Mad Love. Released as the disc's third single, it was produced by Peter Asher and was issued on Asylum Records. Ronstadt's cover of "I Can't Let Go" reached number 27 on the Cash Box Top 100 and number 31 on the Billboard Hot 100 chart in the summer of 1980.

=== Chart performance ===
Chart (1980)	Peak position
U.S. Billboard Hot 100	31
U.S. Billboard Hot Adult Contemporary Tracks	48
U.S. Cashbox Top 100	27
Canada RPM Top Singles	30

== Other versions ==
- A group from the Washington, D.C., area, Nobody's Children, released this song on a single in 1967.
- The Dickies included this song (under the name "Can't Let Go") on their 1998 all-covers album, Dogs from the Hare That Bit Us.
- Les Fradkin covered the song on his 2006 album, Goin' Back.
- Canadian rock band Sloan covered this song on their ersatz-live album, Recorded Live at a Sloan Party.
