= Anne Buist =

Australian researcher and practising psychiatrist

Anne Elizabeth Buist
- Born: Australia
- Other name: Simone Sinna (pen name)
- Education: University of Melbourne (MD, M Med); Monash University (M.B.B.S.); Royal Australian and New Zealand College of Psychiatrists
- Known for: Perinatal psychiatry, women’s mental health, antidepressants in breastmilk
- Spouse: Graeme Simsion (1989 – present)
- Children: 2
- Scientific career
- Fields: Women's mental and sexual health

Anne Buist AO is an Australian researcher and practising psychiatrist specializing in women's mental health, in particular postpartum psychiatric illnesses. She is also a novelist, author of the Natalie King crime fiction series, and co-author, with her husband Graeme Simsion, of the novels Two Steps Forward (2017) and Two Steps Onward (2021).

== Education ==
Buist has an M.B.B.S. from Monash University in 1981 and was admitted as a Fellow of the Royal Australian and New Zealand College of Psychiatrists in 1989. She has an MMed from the University of Melbourne for research into infants exposed to antidepressants in breastmilk in 1992, and an MD from the University of Melbourne in 1999 for her study of the long-term effects of childhood abuse.

== Psychiatric and research career ==
From 1993 to 1997, Buist was Director of Psychiatry at the Mercy Hospital for Women, Melbourne, and was then appointed Associate Professor at the University of Melbourne in 1997, and became the Professor and Director of Women's Mental Health in 2006. Buist has published over 100 peer-reviewed journal articles and "Psychiatric Disorders Associated with Children" (1995) She is also the past president of the Australasian Marcé Society for Perinatal Mental Health, and was the director of the Beyond Blue postnatal depression program from 2001 to 2005.

Buist was appointed as an Officer of the Order of Australia (AO) in the 2026 Australia Day Honours for "distinguished service to psychiatry, to advancing best practice in perinatal mental health research and treatment, and to mental health education".

== Fiction writer ==
Buist has written novels in the genres of crime and erotica, and also a psychiatric text. (under the pseudonym Simone Sinna, an anagram of her married name, Anne Simsion) were ten novels and novellas of contemporary paranormal and crime erotica (published by Siren Publishing from 2011 to 2014). In 2015, she began to publish mainstream crime, with protagonist Natalie King, a forensic psychiatrist with bipolar disorder. The first of these was Medea’s Curse (which shortlisted for the Davitt Awards (Best Adult Novel and Best Debut Crime categories). ), followed by Dangerous to Know (2016), and then This I Would Kill For (January 2018). In 2015 Two Steps Forward, a novel co-authored with her husband Graeme Simsion, was published in 2017. In April 2020 her crime novel, The Long Shadow, was published by Text Publishing.

In January 2024, The Glass House, co-written with Simsion, was published by Hachette Australia.

Medea’s Curse has been optioned by Causeway Films and Two Steps Forward by Fox Searchlight with Ellen DeGeneres' A Very Good Production to produce.

== Personal life ==
Buist has been married to novelist Graeme Simsion since 1989 and they have two children. In 2011, she and Simsion walked the Camino de Santiago de Compostela (Le Chemin de St. Jacques de Compostell) from Cluny in central France, which inspired their joint novel Two Steps Forward.
