= Mary Mason =

British singer

- Genre: Pop
- Instrument: Voice
- Labels: CBS, Epic

Mary Mason is a British singer . She was a A Song for Europe contestant who entered the competition with "What Do You Say to Love?". She scored a minor hit in the UK Singles Chart in 1977 with a medley of Chip Taylor's "Angel of the Morning" / "Any Way That You Want Me".

== Background ==
Mason would have chart success in 1977. She had a minor hit in the UK Singles Chart with a medley of Chip Taylor's "Angel of the Morning" / "Any Way That You Want Me", reaching No. 27 and spending six weeks in the chart.

== Career ==
=== Eurovision single ===
An article, Eurovision short list dozen are chosen appeared 25 December 1976 issue of Music Week. The list included, After All This Time, by David Mindel and Gary Benson, performed by Wesley Park and Smith; A Little Give — A Little Take, by Roger Greenaway and Tony Macaulay, performed by the Carl Wayne Band, Rock Bottom, by Mike Moran and Lynsey de Paul, sung by Kay Garner; "Where Were You When I Needed Your Love" by John Macleod sung by The Foundations, and "What Do You Say to Love" by, Nick Ryan and Robin Slater, sung by Mary Mason.

In 1977, Mason took part in the A Song for Europe contest, with the song "What Do You Say to Love?". The song finished in second place, behind Lynsey de Paul and Mike Moran's "Rock Bottom". The television broadcast for the show was blacked out, which disappointed Mason as she told the press she had been relying on making a visual impact. She recorded for the Epic label in the UK.

=== "Angel of the Morning" ===
The 11 June 1977 issue of RPM Weekly showed that her single "Angel of the Morning" along with "Everybody Be Dancing" by Starbuck, "Say What's On Your Mind" by The Great Rufus Road Machine and "Going With My Eyes Open" by David Soul was playlisted on CKLB in Oshawa, Canada.

According to the 1 October issue of Music Week, Mason's single was a hit pick by Nicky Jackson on Radio Victory in Portsmouth. In the same issue her single was listed as a star breaker.

Spending six weeks in the UK chart, it peaked at no. 27.

== Discography ==
Singles
Act	Release	Catalogue	Year	Notes
Mary Mason	"What Do You Say to Love" / "Oh Mister Moonlight"	CBS S CBS 5056	1977	
Mary Mason	"Angel Of The Morning" / "Any Way That You Want Me" / "Stuff That Dreams Are Made Of"	Epic S EPC 5552	1977	
Mary Mason	"The Right Time of the Night" / "Baby Make It Soon" / "I'm The One Who Cares"	Epic S EPC 5948	1978	
Mary Mason	"Little Bit Right, Little Bit Wrong" / " I'm The One Who Cares"	Epic S EPC 6078	1978	
Mary Mason	"The Right Time Of The Night / Baby Make It Soon" / "I'm The One Who Cares"	Epic S EPC 6265	1978	

Album
Act	Release	Catalogue	Year	Notes
Mary Mason	Angel Of The Morning	Epic EPC 82496	1978	
