= List of Canadian number-one albums of 1981 =

These are the Canadian number-one albums of 1981. The charts were compiled and published by RPM every Saturday.

== Number-one albums ==
†	This indicates the best performing album of the year.

Issue date	Album	Artist	Ref
January 3	The River	Bruce Springsteen	
January 10	The River	Bruce Springsteen	
January 17	The River	Bruce Springsteen	
January 24	Double Fantasy	John Lennon and Yoko Ono	
January 31	Double Fantasy	John Lennon and Yoko Ono	
February 7	Zenyatta Mondatta	The Police	
February 14	Zenyatta Mondatta	The Police	
February 21	Zenyatta Mondatta	The Police	
February 28	Zenyatta Mondatta	The Police	
March 7	Zenyatta Mondatta	The Police	
March 14	Double Fantasy	John Lennon and Yoko Ono	
March 21	Double Fantasy	John Lennon and Yoko Ono	
March 28	Double Fantasy	John Lennon and Yoko Ono	
April 4	Moving Pictures	Rush	
April 11	Moving Pictures	Rush	
April 18	Moving Pictures	Rush	
April 25	Moving Pictures	Rush	
May 2	Face Value †	Phil Collins	
May 9	Face Value †	Phil Collins	
May 16	Arc of a Diver	Steve Winwood	
May 23	Arc of a Diver	Steve Winwood	
May 30	Arc of a Diver	Steve Winwood	
June 6	Arc of a Diver	Steve Winwood	
June 13	Dirty Deeds Done Dirt Cheap	AC/DC	
June 20	Dirty Deeds Done Dirt Cheap	AC/DC	
June 27	Face Value †	Phil Collins	
July 4	Dirty Deeds Done Dirt Cheap	AC/DC	
July 11	Dirty Deeds Done Dirt Cheap	AC/DC	
July 18	Dirty Deeds Done Dirt Cheap	AC/DC	
July 25	Dirty Deeds Done Dirt Cheap	AC/DC	
August 1	Dirty Deeds Done Dirt Cheap	AC/DC	
August 8	Dirty Deeds Done Dirt Cheap	AC/DC	
August 15	Dirty Deeds Done Dirt Cheap	AC/DC	
August 22	Dirty Deeds Done Dirt Cheap	AC/DC	
August 29	Long Distance Voyager	The Moody Blues	
September 5	Long Distance Voyager	The Moody Blues	
September 12	Long Distance Voyager	The Moody Blues	
September 19	Long Distance Voyager	The Moody Blues	
September 26	Long Distance Voyager	The Moody Blues	
October 3	Long Distance Voyager	The Moody Blues	
October 10	Tattoo You	The Rolling Stones	
October 17	Tattoo You	The Rolling Stones	
October 24	Tattoo You	The Rolling Stones	
October 31	Tattoo You	The Rolling Stones	
November 7	Tattoo You	The Rolling Stones	
November 14	Tattoo You	The Rolling Stones	
November 21	Tattoo You	The Rolling Stones	
November 28	Ghost in the Machine	The Police	
December 5	Ghost in the Machine	The Police	
December 12	Ghost in the Machine	The Police	
December 19	The Great White North	Bob and Doug McKenzie	
December 26	The Great White North	Bob and Doug McKenzie	

== See also ==
- List of Canadian number-one singles of 1981
