= The Rosie Result =

2019 novel by Graeme Simsion

- First edition
- Author: Graeme Simsion
- Language: English
- Publisher: Text Publishing
- Publication date: 2019

The Rosie Result is a 2019 novel by Australian novelist Graeme Simsion. The work was first published on 5 February 2019 by Text Publishing.

It is the third and final novel in the Don Tillman trilogy, following from The Rosie Project (2013) and The Rosie Effect (2014).

== Synopsis ==
The Rosie Result is set in modern-day Melbourne several years into Don Tillman's marriage to Rosie. They have an 11-year-old son, Hudson, who is having difficulties in school and in various social situations. He may or may not be autistic. Don, hoping to be able to help his son in ways that he wished he had been helped when he was a child, sets to work on "The Hudson Project".

Following an awkward incident at the university where Don is employed - the kind of incident of which readers of the previous two books will be all too familiar - Don is accused of racism. He decides to leave his job to focus on taking care of his son.

== Reception from the autism community ==
The Rosie Result includes several autistic characters, and Simsion states that he felt "huge pressure" to get the autism representation right. Autism community responses suggest that he succeeded. Activist Stuart Neilson says "The book does not struggle, it conveys the confusion around stigma, resourcing and self-awareness very well...If you went through school as an undiagnosed autistic pupil, or suffered the wrath of adults who found it easier to call non-compliance a problem behaviour, or are trying to work through the same problems with your own kids now, you will find this a timely novel." Advocate and author Jeanette Purkis: "I loved how Graeme Simsion approached the topic of autism. It resonated with my own experience…There was lots of humour but also some deep thoughts on what it means it be autistic and indeed what it means to be human." Kathy Hoopman, author of All Cats Have Asperger Syndrome, wrote: "Author Graeme Simsion breaks open the 'A' word by smashing preconceived prejudices and stereotypes". Katie Sutherland: "[The Rosie Result] unpacks a few myths... I was pleased to see 'empathy' deconstructed in the book".

Conversely, Spectrum author Sara Luterman called The Rosie Result "the worst new book I have read in the past three years". She argues that Tillman is "cut from the same cloth as Hugh Dancy's Adam in the eponymous film, Sheldon from The Big Bang Theory and the protagonists of The Good Doctor and Atypical. All portray clueless, quirky white male geniuses to represent autism." Furthermore, Luterman has argued that Simsion's characterisation of female characters, particularly of those with autism spectrum disorder, reduces them to "villains or intolerably shrill".
