= The Rosie Effect =

Book by Graeme Simsion

- First Edition Cover (Australia)
- Author: Graeme Simsion
- Genre: Comedy
- Publisher: Text Publishing
- Publication date: 24 September 2014
- Publication place: Australia
- Media type: Print (hardcover), e-book, audio book
- Pages: 432
- ISBN: 9781925240443
- Followed by: The Best of Adam Sharp

The Rosie Effect is a 2014 novel by Australian novelist Graeme Simsion and the second book of a trilogy including the previous instalment, The Rosie Project, and its sequel, The Rosie Result. The work was first published on 24 September 2014 in Australia / New Zealand by Text Publishing and the rights have since been sold in 24 other territories. International sales are more than 1 million copies. In the United States the novel was published through Simon & Schuster and in the United Kingdom through Penguin Books. The novel centres on Don Tillman, a socially awkward genetics professor, and his preparation for fatherhood.

== Synopsis ==
Don Tillman is an Australian genetics professor who probably has Asperger’s syndrome, though this is never stated explicitly.

In the prequel The Rosie Project, a romantic comedy novel, he met and married Rosie Jarman, a psychology PhD candidate at a university in Melbourne. The Rosie Effect is set in New York City, where Don and Rosie have moved. Don has taken up an associate professor position at Columbia University and Rosie has enrolled in a Doctor of Medicine degree while she concurrently completes the PhD. Early in the story, Rosie becomes pregnant, and Don's philandering mentor, Gene, who has left his wife Claudia, comes to live with them.

The book follows Don's attempts to prepare for parenthood and to support Rosie in her own preparation, drawing on science and the unreliable advice of his friends. Don's unconventional approach alienates Rosie and eventually leads to the breakdown of their marriage. Don pursues Rosie and persuades her to return.

== Film adaptation ==
Sony Pictures optioned film rights to The Rosie Effect in September 2014. No plans for a sequel have been announced.

== Reception ==
Critical reception for The Rosie Effect has been mostly positive and the book was a bestseller in multiple countries. NPR praised the book for not overly romanticizing Don, for achieving a tricky balance, and for its "classic Hitchcockian suspense". Bill Gates included The Rosie Effect as the only novel in his Top Five Books for 2014. The Sydney Morning Herald, which had praised The Rosie Project, published two reviews, one of which criticized the novel as "formulaic" while the second called it "a very funny book, possibly the funniest this year".

The Rosie Effect does not appear to have drawn as much comment from the autism community as the other two books in the series, but autism activist Stuart Neilson described the commentary on diagnosis as 'hilariously realistic'.

== Awards ==
- Indie Book Awards (Australia), Shortlisted, 2015
- Nielsen BookData Booksellers Choice Award, Shortlisted, 2015
- Australian Book Industry General Fiction Award, Shortlisted, 2015
