= Graeme Simsion =

Australian writer and data modeller

Graeme C. Simsion
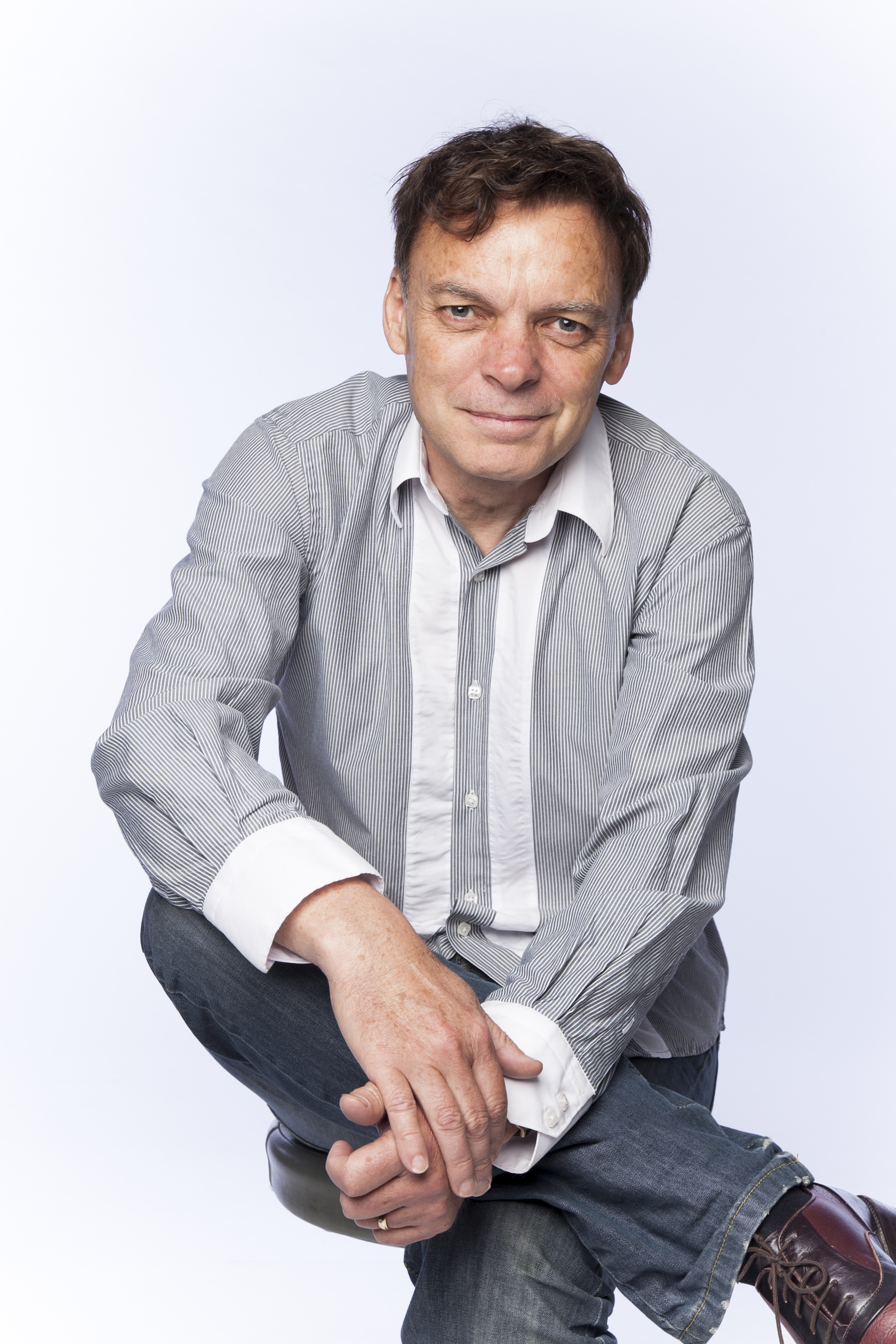
- Simsion in 2012
- Born: 1956 (age 69–70); Auckland
- Education: University of Melbourne; Deakin University; Monash University
- Occupations: Author and data modeller
- Spouse: Anne Buist
- Children: 2
- Writing career
- Notable work: The Rosie Project
- Notable awards: 2012 Victorian Premier's Unpublished Manuscript Award; 2014 Australian Book Industry's Book of the Year
- Website: graemesimsion.com

Graeme C. Simsion is a New Zealand-born Australian author, screenwriter, playwright, and data modeller, best known for his first novel The Rosie Project.

== Early life and education ==
Simsion was born in New Zealand and moved to Australia with his family when he was 12 years old.

Prior to becoming an author, Simsion was an information systems consultant, co-authoring the book Data Modelling Essentials, and worked in wine distribution.

== Literary career ==
=== Rosie novels ===
In 2012 Simsion won the Victorian Premier's Unpublished Manuscript Award for his book The Rosie Project. The novel was published by Text Publishing to critical acclaim in Australia in January 2014. By March 2016 it had sold more than three and a half million copies in over 40 countries around the world.

Simsion initially wrote The Rosie Project as a screenplay, which has since been optioned to Sony Pictures Entertainment.

A sequel titled The Rosie Effect, was published on 24 September 2014.

The third and final book, The Rosie Result, was published in February 2019.

=== Other novels ===
Simsion's third novel, The Best of Adam Sharp was published by Text Publishing in 2016. Its movie rights were optioned to Toni Collette’s company Vocab Films.

Simsion's fourth novel Two Steps Forward, a collaboration with his wife Anne Buist, was published on 2 October 2017. Its sequel, titled Two Steps Onward, was published in June 2021.

== Personal life ==
Simsion is married to psychiatrist Anne Buist and has two children.

In 2006 he obtained a PhD in data modelling from the University of Melbourne.

== Awards ==
=== The Rosie Project ===
- International IMPAC Dublin Literary Award, Ireland, longlisted, 2015
- Australian Book Industry's Book of the Year, Winner, 2014
- Australian Book Industry's General Fiction Book of the Year, winner, 2014
- Nielsen BookData Booksellers Choice Award, shortlisted, 2014
- Best Debut Fiction, Independent Booksellers of Australia Awards, shortlisted, 2014
- Waverton Good Read Award, United Kingdom, shortlisted, 2014
- The Indie Awards, shortlisted, 2014
- Victorian Premier's Award for Best Unpublished Manuscript, Winner, 2012

=== The Rosie Effect ===
- Indie Book Awards, shortlisted, 2015
- Nielsen BookData Booksellers Choice Award, shortlisted, 2015
- Australian Book Industry General Fiction Award, shortlisted, 2015

=== Other awards ===
- Doctor of Communication Honoris Causa - RMIT
- The Age Short Story Award (2012) – second prize - Three Encounters with the Physical
- Stringybark Seven Deadly Sins Award (2012) - second prize - Eulogy for a Sinner

== Publications ==
=== Novels ===
- Two Steps Onward, with Anne Buist, Text Publishing, Melbourne, 2021 ISBN 9781922330697
- The Rosie Result, Text Publishing, Melbourne, 2019 ISBN 9781925773477
- Two Steps Forward, with Anne Buist, Text Publishing, Melbourne, 2017 ISBN 9781925498776
- The Best of Adam Sharp, Text Publishing, Melbourne, 2016 ISBN 9781925355888
- The Rosie Effect, Text Publishing, Melbourne, 2014 ISBN 9781922182104
- The Rosie Project, Text Publishing, Melbourne, 2012 ISBN 9781922079770

=== Short stories ===
- Intervention on the Number 3 Tram, Review of Australian Fiction, 2017.
- Like It Was Yesterday, Review of Australian Fiction, 2015.
- The Life and Times of Greasy Joe, The Big Issue, 2015.
- A Visit to the Other Side, Conde Nast Traveller, 2013.
- Three Encounters with the Physical, The Age Short Story Award, 2013.
- Cutting, Behind the Wattles, 2012.
- Eulogy for a Sinner, Seven Deadly Sins, 2012.
- A Confession in Three Parts, The Road Home, 2012.
- Savoir Faire, The Road Home, 2012.
- Natural Selection, The Road Home, 2012.
- A Short Submission to the Coroner, Tainted Innocence, 2012.
- GSOH, Tainted Innocence, 2012.
- The Klara Project Phase 1, The Envelope Please, 2007.

=== Technical ===
- Simsion, Milton and Shanks: "Data Modeling: Description or Design?" Information and Management, May 2012.
- "Data Modeling: Theory and Practice" by Graeme Simsion, 2007, Technics Publications, ISBN 978-0977140015
- "Data Modeling Essentials" by Graeme Simsion & Graham Witt, 2004 3rd ed, Morgan Kaufmann, San Francisco ISBN 0126445516
- Moody, D and Simsion, G: "Justifying Investment in Information Resource Management", Australian Journal of Information Systems, September 1995.
- "A Structured Approach to Data Modeling", Australian Computer Journal, August,1989.
- Simsion, G.C and Symington, J.A: "A Comparison of Network and Relational Database Architectures in a Commercial Environment", Australian Computer Journal, November 1981.

== Short films and plays ==
- Thought Tracker, Producer, Premiere: Westside Shorts, 2013
- Decisions, Writer-Producer, Premiere: Westside Shorts, 2012
- The Prince, Writer-Producer, Premiere: Westside Shorts, 2012
- The Perfect Gift, Writer-Producer, (Director: Carley Sheffield), Premiere: Toronto Urban Film Festival, 2012
- Reason for Living, Producer-Director, Premiere: Bondi Film Festival, 2012
- Push Up, Writer-Producer, (Director: Jason Christou), Premiere: Flickerfest Film Festival, Sydney, 2010
- The Last Bottle, Writer-Producer, (Directors Michael Carsen and Beth Child), Premiere: Zero Film Festival (New York), 2010, ABC Television, 2010
- Transformation, Writer-Producer, (Director: Rebecca Peniston-Bird), Premiere: St Kilda Film Festival, 2009, ABC Television, 2010
- Red Porsche, Writer-Producer, (Director: Chris Wurm), Premiere: Westside Shorts, 2009
- Turning Back the Clocks, Writer-Producer, (Director: Michael Carsen), Premiere: Janison Short and Sharp Film Festival, 2009
- Prisoner's Dilemma, Writer, Premiere: Short and Sweet Festival, Melbourne, 2008
- Hot Water, Writer, Premiere: Defector Theatre, Melbourne, 2008
- Key Change, Writer-Producer, (Director: David Grant), Premiere: Katoomba Film Festival, 2008
