= The Rosie Project =

Book by Graeme Simsion

- First Edition
- Author: Graeme Simsion
- Genre: Romance fiction
- Publisher: Text Publishing
- Publication date: 30 January 2013
- Publication place: Australia
- Media type: Print (hardcover), e-book
- Pages: 304
- ISBN: 9781922079770
- Followed by: The Rosie Effect

The Rosie Project is a 2013 Australian novel by Australian novelist Graeme Simsion. The novel centres on genetics professor Don Tillman, who struggles to have serious relationships with women. With a friend's help, he devises a questionnaire to assess the suitability of female partners. His plans are set off course when he meets Rosie, who does not fit many of Tillman's criteria, but becomes a big part of his life. The work was first published on 30 January 2013 in Australia by Text Publishing and the rights have since been sold in over 40 other countries. International sales are in excess of 3.5 million copies and the book was named Book of the Year for 2014 by the Australian Book Industry Association. In the United States the novel was published through Simon & Schuster and in the United Kingdom through Penguin Books.

A sequel, titled The Rosie Effect, was released in 2014, followed in 2019 by the third and final book in the trilogy, The Rosie Result.

== Synopsis ==
Don Tillman is an Australian genetics professor who has spent his days organising his life with the expectation that it will reduce inefficiency, improve himself as a person, and make him an all around happier person. He does not fit in well with others, which has kept Don from dating and having a satisfying romantic life. This is something that confounds him, as he believes that his IQ, physical health, finances, and social status should otherwise make him an appealing mate.

After spending time with his best friend and womanising colleague Gene and his wife Claudia, Don comes up with the idea of the "Wife Project", a questionnaire that would help find the perfect mate. This turns out to be something more easily done in theory, as his questionnaire fails to produce a satisfactory woman and alienates many potential candidates.

Soon after, Gene introduces him to Rosie, a bartender whom he quickly eliminates as unsuitable per his criteria. Despite this, Don finds himself quickly drawn to her and even goes so far to agree to help her find her biological father, a man that her mother slept with after a graduation party — a task Don terms the "Father Project". Her mother is dead and, as such, Rosie cannot ask her for the answer. They can only go on the information that her father was an attendee at the party. The two manage to eliminate most of the attendees via DNA testing, which Don secretly does in the university laboratory under the guise of it being an official project.

As time progresses, Rosie begins to challenge more and more of Don's habits and assumptions, and he is surprised when she reveals that she is working as a bartender in order to pay her way through university while she works on her doctorate in psychology. He also finds that part of the reason that Rosie is so desperate to find her biological father is because of her unsatisfactory relationship with her stepfather Phil. Don also finally meets a woman who fulfills all of his criteria, but he discovers that he is completely unattracted to her.

Eventually, the "Father Project" eliminates all but a few people, two of which require that Don and Rosie travel to New York City. Once there, Rosie forces Don to abandon his schedules in exchange for a spontaneous trip through the city, which he finds enjoyable. This culminates in the two almost having sex, only for Rosie to change her mind because she is unsure that a relationship with Don could actually work out. The two return to Australia where Don continues the "Father Project" and realises that his friend Gene may actually be Rosie's father since he also attended the party (as the genetics tutor for Rosie's mother's medical cohort) and is also very promiscuous.

After some thinking, Don decides that he will test Gene and that he will also try to persuade Rosie to marry him, as he has discovered that he is genuinely attracted to her. Despite trying to change to fit what he believes she needs, Don is rejected by Rosie when he says that he does not feel love like others do. However, this rejection causes Don to realise that he actually does love Rosie. He also decides to confront her father Phil over her father issues, as Rosie felt neglected because she believed that Phil prioritised his career over her and failed to fulfil a promise to go to Disneyland, a move that she views as representative of their relationship as a whole.

Rosie inevitably discovers that Gene may be her real father and she confronts him over this along with his wife Claudia, who attempted to ignore his womanising. Don arrives at the scene just in time to watch Phil punch Gene (as Phil had been dating Rosie's mother at the time of her conception), after which Don and Rosie reconcile and she agrees to marry him. Rosie also reconciles with her father Phil and after she marries Don, the two of them move to New York to start anew. The book ends with Don running a final test on a sample of Phil's DNA. This test confirms that Phil was her biological father after all, and the whole issue was raised by Rosie's mother because of Gene's negligence in explaining to his students the rules of eye colour inheritance. Thus, Rosie finds out about her biological father and her mother's secret love affair remains a secret.

== Film adaptation ==
In September 2014, it was confirmed that Sony Pictures optioned film rights to The Rosie Project. Simsion penned the first draft of the script and screenwriters Scott Neustadter and Michael H. Weber were later brought on to work on the final script, with Phil Lord and Christopher Miller set to potentially direct. Jennifer Lawrence was cast as the female lead for the film in July 2015. In October 2015, Lawrence dropped out to star in the film mother! by Darren Aronofsky. In July 2015, Richard Linklater was in talks to direct after Lord and Miller dropped out to do other projects. However, after Lawrence dropped out of the film, so did Linklater.

In 2017, TriStar Pictures announced that Ben Taylor would direct the film. In 2021, Steve Falk and Henry Cavill were announced as the director and the lead actor of the film, respectively.

In 2024, it was announced that Tom Holland would produce the film for TriStar Pictures as one of the first films from his new Billy17 production company.

== Reception ==
Critical reception for The Rosie Project has been mostly positive and the book was a bestseller in several countries. NPR gave a favorable review for the work, which they felt was charming. Bill Gates included The Rosie Project as the only novel in his Six Books I'd Recommend.

It was the winner of the Book of the Year Award at the 2014 Australian Book Industry Awards.

The public response from the autism community has been largely positive. Jo Case, writing in Australian Book Review, says 'the overall effect will be...to increase understanding [of autism] and to refute some common myths.' Author Helen Hoang says 'reading The Rosie Project was an experience for me. It was the first time I'd been exposed to a character like Don, and I treasured him. I identified with him in a rare way. Autism activist Stuart Neilson writes 'I loved The Rosie Project, which had some acute observation of people like me. In a similar vein, Scott Rickard says 'I felt seen'. Autistic advocate Lyric Holmans ("Neurodivergent Rebel") also recommends the book. Conversely, Researcher Anna N. de Hooge sees the book as supporting 'Aspie supremacy' which she compares with anti-autistic ableism as 'two sides of the same coin', while noting the concept has its defenders.

== Awards ==
- International IMPAC Dublin Literary Award, Ireland, Longlisted, 2015
- Australian Book Industry's Book of the Year, Winner, 2014
- Australian Book Industry's General Fiction Book of the Year, Winner, 2014
- Nielsen BookData Booksellers Choice Award, Shortlisted, 2014
- Best Debut Fiction, Independent Booksellers of Australia Awards, Shortlisted, 2014
- Waverton Good Read Award, United Kingdom, Shortlisted, 2014
- The Indie Awards, Shortlisted, 2014
- Victorian Premier's Award for Best Unpublished Manuscript, Winner, 2012
