= The Best of Adam Sharp =

2016 novel by Graeme Simsion

- Australian Paperback Edition Cover
- Author: Graeme Simsion
- Genre: Contemporary fiction
- Publisher: Text Publishing
- Publication date: 19 September 2016
- Publication place: Australia
- Media type: Print (hardcover), e-book, audio-book
- Pages: 384
- ISBN: 9781925498752
- Preceded by: The Rosie Effect

The Best of Adam Sharp is a 2016 novel by Australian novelist Graeme Simsion. The work was first published on 19 September 2016 in Australia / New Zealand by Text Publishing. English-language rights have been sold worldwide (St Martin’s Press, USA, Michael Joseph UK, HarperCollins Canada). Translation rights have been sold in Czech, Estonian, French, German, Hebrew, Hungarian, Italian, Dutch, and Polish. Movie rights have been optioned to Vocab Films with Toni Collette attached to play the role of Angelina.

The novel follows the rekindling of a love affair and the impact on the long-term relationships of Adam and his former lover, Angelina. Music – largely popular songs from the 1960s and 1970s – features heavily in the book, and the publishers provide a playlist intended to enhance the reading experience.

== Synopsis ==
Adam Sharp is an English information technology consultant and part-time piano player, in a settled but tired long-term relationship with Claire. He nurses a nostalgia for his "Great Lost Love"—Angelina, with whom he had a brief affair twenty-two years ago during a work assignment in Melbourne, Australia. Then Angelina gets back in touch and Adam’s life is thrown into confusion.

The novel is narrated from Adam’s point of view and is in two parts. Part I describes the present-day (2012) aftermath of Angelina’s re-connecting, with extensive flashbacks to their time in Melbourne. After their email interactions develop into a long-distance affair, Adam decides to leave Claire and accept an invitation to spend a week with Angelina and her husband Charlie at their vacation home in France. In Part II, Adam discovers that he is a player in a complex marital game. The narrative focuses on his efforts to understand Charlie and Angelina’s motivations, and on his decision as to whether to reunite with Angelina.

== Film ==
Vocab Films optioned rights to The Best of Adam Sharp — including a screenplay also by Simsion — in May, 2017 with Toni Collette attached to play the role of Angelina.

== Role of music ==
Simsion has stated that he set out to write a book with a soundtrack and the appendix lists 47 songs, predominantly from the 1960s and 1970s.

== Reception ==
Critical reception for The Best of Adam Sharp has been divided. The Age and the Sydney Morning Herald praised it as "a dark comedy of manners, an adult entertainment that extends the range of his first, more light-hearted book"; The Daily Review’s positive assessment commented that it had the tight edge of a Woody Allen film and that "some of it is quite lovely and moving; some of it is funny and much of it is unsettling." The Washington Post described Part I as a "fun sweet ride" but felt that the playlist in Part II could not rescue the "ill-considered" plot. The Australian compared it unfavourably with The Rosie Project, criticizing its nostalgic sentimentality, relieved only by occasional flashes of Simsion's "droll best".
