= Merrilee Rush =

American singer (born 1944)

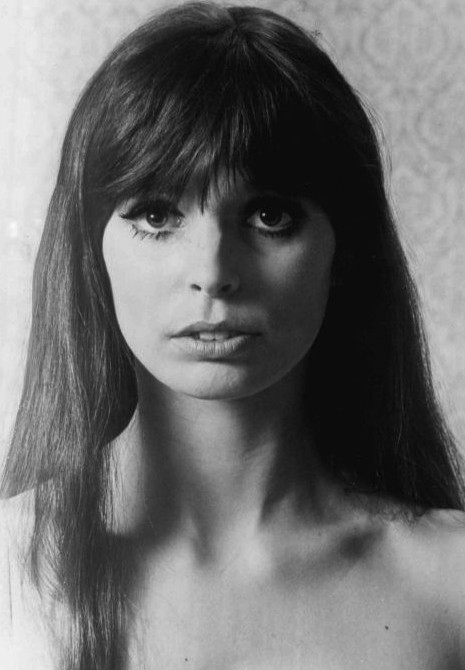
- Rush in 1969
- Born: Merrilee Gunst; January 26, 1944 (age 82); Seattle, Washington, U.S.
- Occupation: Singer
- Known for: Angel of the Morning
- Spouse: Billy Mac

Merrilee Rush (née Gunst; January 26, 1944) is an American singer, best known for her recording of the song "Angel of the Morning", a top-10 hit which earned her a Grammy nomination for female vocalist of the year in 1968.

== Early life and career ==
Rush was born in Seattle, Washington to Reuben and Edith Gunst. Her father was a homebuilder. She grew up in north Seattle, and studied classical piano from a young age. In 1960, she auditioned and became the singer for the Amazing Aztecs, a Seattle-area rock and roll band led by saxophone player Neil Rush, whom she would later marry. The two went on to form Merrilee and Her Men, doing mostly cover versions of pop hits, and then joined rhythm and blues group Tiny Tony and the Statics, whose regional hit "Hey Mrs. Jones", on the Bolo label, featured Rush's keyboard playing and vocals.

== Merrilee Rush and the Turnabouts ==
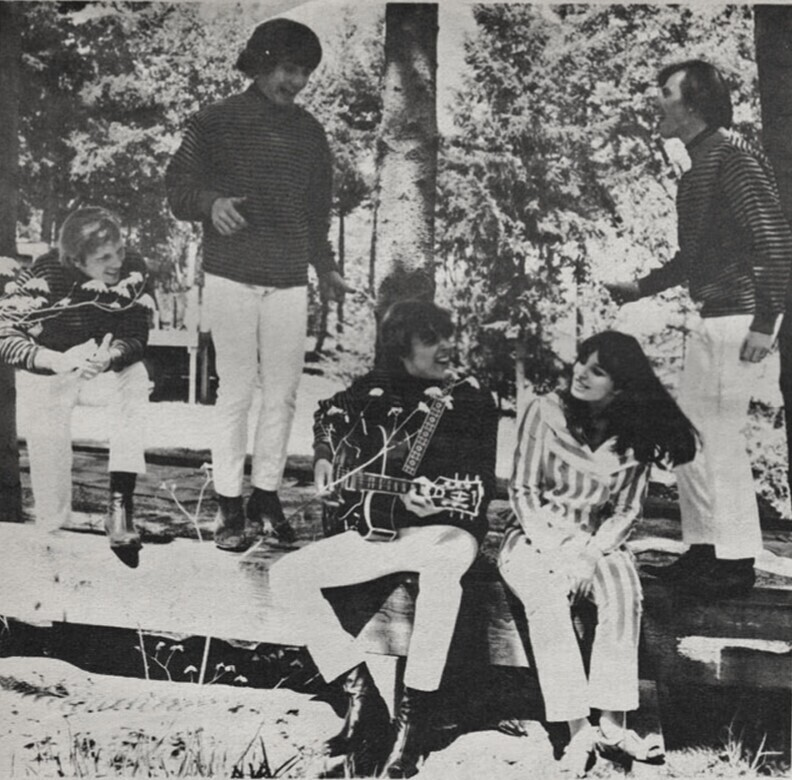
Merrilee Rush and the Turnabouts in 1967

In 1965, the pair formed Merrilee Rush and the Turnabouts, who soon became a popular act on the Pacific Northwest's teen dancehall circuit, touring throughout Washington and Oregon. A member of the group's road crew also worked for Paul Revere & the Raiders, and through this connection, Rush was invited to be the opening act on the Raiders' tour of the southern United States in 1967. While in Memphis, Tennessee, Raiders lead vocalist Mark Lindsay introduced Rush to record producer Chips Moman.

"Angel of the Morning" was written and composed by the songwriter Chip Taylor. Rush's version was recorded at Moman's American Sound Studio in Memphis in early 1968, and was produced by Moman and Tommy Cogbill. Released by Bell Records, the song climbed to No. 7 in late June 1968 on the U.S. Billboard Hot 100 chart, No. 1 in Canada, and was a major hit in several other countries. The one millionth sale of this record was reported by the Recording Industry Association of America (R.I.A.A.) in 1970. Although credited to "Merrilee Rush and the Turnabouts", both the single and subsequent album (also called Angel of the Morning) were recorded using the same musicians who played on Elvis Presley's Memphis recordings.

"Angel of the Morning" garnered Rush a Grammy Award nomination for best Contemporary Pop Female Vocalist of the year. She was nominated along with Barbra Streisand ("Funny Girl"), Dionne Warwick ("Do You Know the Way to San Jose"), Aretha Franklin ("I Say a Little Prayer"), and Mary Hopkin ("Those Were the Days"). Warwick was the eventual winner.

The song has been featured in the major motion pictures Jerry Maguire and Fingers.

Merrilee Rush and the Turnabouts released one more single on Bell, "That Kind of Woman", in 1968. It reached No. 28 in Canada.

Her next single titled "Reach Out" on AGP Records reached No. 89 in Canada.

== Television appearances ==
Rush appeared on numerous television programs in the 1960s and 1970s, including American Bandstand, The Midnight Special (Episode 2 aired February 9, 1973), The Joey Bishop Show, Happening, The Glen Campbell Goodtime Hour, The Everly Brothers Show, and Something Else hosted by John Byner. In 1984, she appeared as herself, performing the holiday favorite "White Christmas", in the syndicated Christmas special Scrooge's Rock and Roll Christmas, which starred Jack Elam as Ebenezer Scrooge. That program also featured holiday performances by Three Dog Night, Paul Revere & the Raiders, The Association, Bobby Goldsboro, Mike Love of The Beach Boys, Dean Torrence of Jan and Dean, and Mary MacGregor.

== Solo career ==
In 1969, now formally a solo artist, she released four more singles ("Reach Out", "Everyday Livin' Days", "Sign On for the Good Times", and "Angel on My Shoulder") on the Chips Moman-run Bell subsidiary, AGP Records. In 1971, she signed with Scepter Records and released one single, a cover of the Carole King song "Child of Mine". While that was Rush's lone release on Scepter, she cut several tracks for the label including a femme version of the Billy Joel song "She's Got a Way" ("He's Got a Way"). In 1976, Rush signed with United Artists Records, which released three singles: "Could It Be Love I Found Tonight", "Save Me" and "Rainstorm". Her self-titled album for United Artists was released in 1977.

== Later career ==
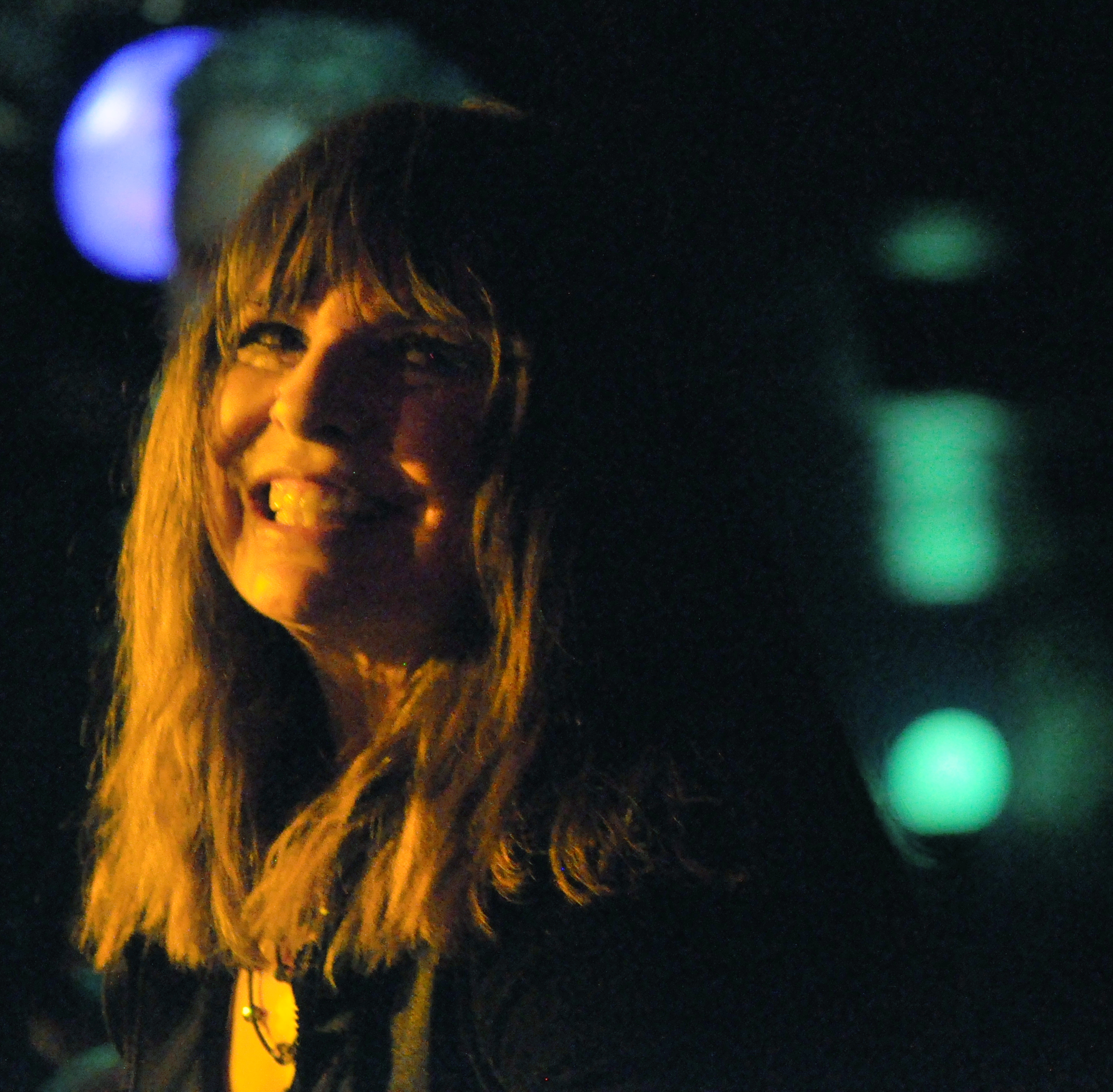
Rush in 2013

By the turn of the 21st century, Rush was living in the countryside near Seattle in a century-old farmhouse that was built by her grandfather. She continued to perform with her own band in rock and roll nostalgia shows across the country.

In September 2023, Rush was inducted into the California Music Hall of Fame and received The Carol Kaye Inspiration Award.

In 1989, the Northwest Area Musicians' Association (NAMA) honored Rush with membership in the NAMA Hall of Fame.

In 2003, Rush appeared in the PBS special At the Drive-In along with Jan Berry and Dean Torrence (of Jan and Dean), Fabian, Bobby Vee, Chris Montez, Dodie Stevens, and Matthew and Gunnar Nelson (the sons of Ricky Nelson).

Rush's Angel of the Morning album has been re-published on CD via the Rev-Ola record label. The re-issue includes the entire original 1968 LP, and it features the Top Ten title track and the follow-up single "That Kind of Woman", in addition to nine non-LP album singles and B-sides as bonus tracks. The bonus tracks include a psychedelic version of the Four Tops' "Reach Out" (an AGP label single release that reached No. 79 on the Billboard Hot 100), and a cover of Burt Bacharach's "What the World Needs Now Is Love", which was produced by Quincy Jones for the soundtrack album to the film Bob & Carol & Ted & Alice.

== Personal life ==
She is married to singer-songwriter and entertainer Billy Mac. Merrilee was a breeder of numerous champion Old English Sheepdogs for many decades. She and her husband have a livestream show on his YouTube channel, Billy Mac Songs.
