= Al Gorgoni =

American songwriter

- Born: October 11, 1939 (age 86); Philadelphia, Pennsylvania, United States
- Genres: R&B/Soul, Rock/Folk, Pop, Jazz/Jazz-Rock
- Occupations: musician, songwriter, record producer, composer, arranger.
- Instrument: guitar
- Website: gorgoni.net

Al Gorgoni (born 1939) is an American guitarist, composer, arranger, and producer, known for his work as a studio musician during the 1960s and 1970s.

== Biography ==
Growing up in Philadelphia, his family moved to The Bronx where he took up the guitar at age 14.

His first recording sessions took place in 1959, playing on demo recordings with Brill Building songwriters Barry Mann, Cynthia Weil, Carole King, Gerry Goffin, and Phil Spector. Gorgoni eventually moved into proper sessions, appearing on hit singles such as "The Name Game" by Shirley Ellis, "Sherry," "Walk Like A Man" and "Big Girls Don't Cry" by The Four Seasons, "Leader of the Pack" by The Shangri-Las, and "Chapel of Love" by The Dixie Cups. Other hits featuring Gorgoni's playing are "The Sound of Silence" by Simon & Garfunkel, "Brown Eyed Girl" by Van Morrison, "I'm a Believer" by The Monkees, "At Seventeen" by Janis Ian, "Sugar, Sugar" by The Archies, and "Brand New Key" by Melanie.

Gorgoni worked with many other artists including Joan Baez, Blood Sweat & Tears, Bobby Darin, Neil Diamond, Bob Dylan, Richard and Mimi Fariña, Aretha Franklin, Marvin Gaye and Tammi Terrell, Astrud Gilberto, Herbie Mann, Laura Nyro, James Taylor, and B.J. Thomas. This article contains only a partial list of credits.

== Discography ==
With Herbie Mann

- Our Mann Flute (Atlantic, 1966)

With Barry Mann

- Lay It All Out (CBS Records, 1971)
- Barry Mann (Casablanca Records, 1980)

With Al Kooper

- White Chocolate (Sony, 2008)

With Kai Winding

- The In Instrumentals (Verve, 1965)

With Simon & Garfunkel

- Sounds of Silence (Columbia Records, 1966)

With Carole Bayer Sager

- Carole Bayer Sager (Elektra Records, 1977)

With Janis Ian

- Janis Ian (Verve, 1967)
- Stars (Columbia Records, 1974)
- Aftertones (Columbia Records, 1975)
- Janis Ian (Columbia Records, 1978)

With B.J Thomas

- Billy Joe Thomas (1972)
- Rock'n'Roll Lullaby (1972)
- Songs (1973)
- Longhorn & London Bridges (1974)

Gorgoni, Martin and Taylor ( Buddah /Legacy, 1972)

== Personal life ==
Gorgoni is married, and they have two sons, Adam and Julian. Adam Gorgoni is a film composer.
